= 1991–92 Newcastle Breakers FC season =

Newcastle Breakers
1991–92 season
- Chairman: Con Mitsios
- Manager: Bruce Stowell
- Stadium: Breakers Stadium
- National Soccer League: 11th
- NSL Cup: First round
- Top goalscorer: League: John Koch (7); All: John Koch (7)
- Highest home attendance: 6,759 vs. Sydney Olympic (22 March 1992); National Soccer League
- Lowest home attendance: 1,024 vs. Marconi Fairfield (20 November 1991); NSL Cup
- Average home league attendance: 4,022
- Biggest win: 4–1 vs. Melbourne Croatia (6 March 1992); National Soccer League
- Biggest defeat: 0–6 vs. Melbourne Croatia (8 December 1991); National Soccer League

The 1991–92 season was the first season in the history of Newcastle Breakers. It was also the first season in the National Soccer League. In addition to the domestic league, they also participated in the NSL Cup. Newcastle Breakers finished 11th in their National Soccer League season, and were eliminated in the NSL Cup first round by Marconi Fairfield.

== Players ==
Note: Flags indicate national team as defined under FIFA eligibility rules; some limited exceptions apply. Players may hold more than one non-FIFA nationality.

No.	Pos.	Nation	Player
—	FW	AUS	Dean Adamson
—	FW	NZL	Noel Barkley
—	GK	AUS	Simon Devetak
—	FW	NED	Pierre Essers
—	GK	AUS	Mike Gibson
—	MF	AUS	Troy Halpin
—	MF	SCO	Ian Heddle
—	MF	AUS	Darren Hillier
—	DF	AUS	John Koch
—	MF	AUS	Andrew Koczka
—	GK	AUS	Sean Lahiff
—	FW	AUS	Ben Lane

No.	Pos.	Nation	Player
—	DF	AUS	Dominic Longo
—	DF	AUS	Ralph Maier
—	MF	AUS	Brad Maloney
—	MF	AUS	Nick Meredith
—	DF	AUS	Craig Moffitt
—	DF	AUS	Bobby Naumov
—	DF	AUS	Darren Northam
—	DF	AUS	Andy Roberts
—	GK	AUS	John Russell
—	DF	AUS	Andrew Stowell
—	FW	NZL	Colin Tuaa

== Competitions ==
=== Overview ===
Competition	First match	Last match	Starting round	Final position	Record							
Competition	First match	Last match	Starting round	Final position	Pld	W	D	L	GF	GA	GD	Win %
National Soccer League	6 October 1991	29 March 1992	Matchday 1	11th	26	7	8	11	28	39	−11	26.92
NSL Cup	20 November 1991		First round	First round	1	0	0	1	0	3	−3	0.00
Total					27	7	8	12	28	42	−14	25.93

Last updated: complete
Source: Competitions

=== National Soccer League ===
==== League table ====
Pos	Team	Pld	W	D	L	GF	GA	GD	Pts	Qualification or relegation
1	Melbourne Croatia	26	14	7	5	45	26	+19	35	Qualification for the Finals series
2	Sydney Olympic	26	12	10	4	38	27	+11	34	Qualification for the Finals series
3	South Melbourne	26	13	5	8	51	28	+23	31	Qualification for the Finals series
4	Adelaide City (C)	26	10	9	7	26	23	+3	29	Qualification for the Finals series
5	Wollongong City	26	9	10	7	24	17	+7	28	Qualification for the Finals series
6	Brisbane United	26	8	10	8	31	35	−4	26	
7	Marconi Fairfield	26	10	5	11	33	31	+2	25	
8	APIA Leichhardt (R)	26	7	11	8	26	28	−2	25	Relegation to the NSW Division 1
9	Heidelberg United	26	8	8	10	28	33	−5	24	
10	Parramatta Eagles	26	6	11	9	24	24	0	23	
11	Newcastle Breakers	26	7	8	11	28	39	−11	22	
12	Sydney Croatia	26	6	9	11	22	33	−11	21	
13	West Adelaide	26	7	7	12	25	46	−21	21	
14	Preston Makedonia	26	5	10	11	21	32	−11	20	

Updated to match(es) played on unknown. Source: rsssf.com
Rules for classification: 1) points; 2) goal difference; 3) number of goals scored.
(C) Champions; (R) Relegated

==== Results summary ====
Overall								Home						Away					
Pld	W	D	L	GF	GA	GD	Pts	W	D	L	GF	GA	GD	W	D	L	GF	GA	GD
26	7	8	11	28	39	−11	29	4	4	5	14	15	−1	3	4	6	14	24	−10

Source: worldfootball.net

==== Results by round ====
Round	1	2	3	4	5	6	7	8	9	10	11	12	13	14	15	16	17	18	19	20	21	22	23	24	25	26
Ground	H	H	A	H	H	A	H	A	H	A	H	A	H	A	A	H	A	A	H	A	H	A	H	A	H	A
Result	L	W	W	L	L	D	W	L	D	L	D	L	D	D	D	D	L	L	L	W	W	L	W	W	L	D
Position	11	7	7	8	9	9	7	8	9	9	10	11	10	10	10	9	12	13	14	12	12	13	13	11	12	11

Source: worldfootball.net
A = Away; H = Home; W = Win; D = Draw; L = Loss

==== Matches ====
6 October 1991 1	Newcastle Breakers	0–2	Adelaide City	Newcastle
		Report	Tobin (?); Maxwell (?)	Stadium: Breakers Stadium; Attendance: 5,933

11 October 1991 2	Newcastle Breakers	3–1	South Melbourne	Newcastle
	Northam (?); Koczka (?); Barkley (?)	Report	Wright (?)	Stadium: Breakers Stadium; Attendance: 5,225

20 October 1991 3	Preston Makedonia	1–2	Newcastle Breakers	Melbourne
	Trajanovski (?)	Report	Koch (?); Meredith (?)	Stadium: B.T. Connor Reserve; Attendance: 2,000

25 October 1991 4	Newcastle Breakers	1–2	Sydney CSC	Newcastle
	Barkley (?)	Report	Krslovic (?); Caleta (?)	Stadium: Breakers Stadium; Attendance: 2,500

1 November 1991 5	Newcastle Breakers	0–1	APIA Leichhardt	Newcastle
		Report	Gibson (?)	Stadium: Breakers Stadium; Attendance: 4,661

10 November 1991 6	Parramatta Eagles	0–0	Newcastle Breakers	Sydney
		Report		Stadium: Melita Stadium; Attendance: 2,122

15 November 1991 7	Newcastle Breakers	3–1	West Adelaide	Newcastle
	Koch (?); Maier (?); Barkley (?)	Report	Agostino (?)	Stadium: Breakers Stadium; Attendance: 4,484

23 November 1991 8	Marconi Fairfield	2–0	Newcastle Breakers	Sydney
	McCulloch (?); Markovski (?)	Report		Stadium: Marconi Stadium; Attendance: 2,677

29 November 1991 9	Newcastle Breakers	0–0	Heidelberg United	Newcastle
		Report		Stadium: Breakers Stadium; Attendance: 3,456

8 December 1991 10	Melbourne Croatia	6–0	Newcastle Breakers	Melbourne
	Silic (?); Awaritefe (?); Mori (?)	Report		Stadium: Somers St Stadium; Attendance: 3,000

18 December 1991 11	Newcastle Breakers	0–0	Brisbane United	Newcastle
		Report		Stadium: Breakers Stadium; Attendance: 1,728

22 December 1991 12	Sydney Olympic	2–1	Newcastle Breakers	Sydney
	Saad (?); Bredbury (?)	Report	Koch (?)	Stadium: St George Stadium; Attendance: 4,062

26 December 1991 13	Newcastle Breakers	1–1	Wollongong City	Newcastle
	Koch (?)	Report	Yankos (?)	Stadium: Breakers Stadium; Attendance: 3,057

29 December 1991 14	Adelaide City	1–1	Newcastle Breakers	Adelaide
	Mullen (?)	Report	Maloney (?)	Stadium: Hindmarsh Stadium; Attendance: 7,028

8 January 1992 15	South Melbourne	1–1	Newcastle Breakers	Melbourne
	Wade (?)	Report	Tuaa (?)	Stadium: Middle Park; Attendance: 3,000

12 January 1992 16	Newcastle Breakers	0–0	Preston Makedonia	Newcastle
		Report		Stadium: Breakers Stadium; Attendance: 5,127

19 January 1992 17	Sydney CSC	1–0	Newcastle Breakers	Sydney
	Caleta (?)	Report		Stadium: Edensor Park; Attendance: 2,023

26 January 1992 18	APIA Leichhardt	3–1	Newcastle Breakers	Sydney
	Bennett (?); Gibson (?)	Report	Koczka (?)	Stadium: Leichhardt Oval; Attendance: 2,299

7 February 1992 19	Newcastle Breakers	0–2	Parramatta Eagles	Newcastle
		Report	Soper (?); Brown (?)	Stadium: Breakers Stadium; Attendance: 1,924

16 February 1992 20	West Adelaide	1–2	Newcastle Breakers	Adelaide
	Briscoe (?)	Report	Koczka (?)	Stadium: Hindmarsh Stadium; Attendance: 1,476

21 February 1992 21	Newcastle Breakers	1–0	Marconi Fairfield	Newcastle
	Maloney (?)	Report		Stadium: Breakers Stadium; Attendance: 3,320

1 March 1992 22	Heidelberg United	2–0	Newcastle Breakers	Melbourne
	Hunter (?)	Report		Stadium: Olympic Village; Attendance: 1,000

6 March 1992 23	Newcastle Breakers	4–1	Melbourne Croatia	Newcastle
	Koch (?); Moffitt (?); Maloney (?)	Report	Awaritefe (?)	Stadium: Breakers Stadium; Attendance: 4,120

14 March 1992 24	Brisbane United	3–5	Newcastle Breakers	Brisbane
	Markovac (?); Slater (?)	Report	Koch (?); Moffitt (?); Meredith (?)	Stadium: Perry Park; Attendance: 1,600

22 March 1992 25	Newcastle Breakers	1–4	Sydney Olympic	Newcastle
	Meredith (?)	Report	Lee (?); Ironside (?); Bredbury (?)	Stadium: Breakers Stadium; Attendance: 6,759

29 March 1992 26	Wollongong Wolves	1–1	Newcastle Breakers	Wollongong
	Smith (?)	Report	Maier (?)	Stadium: Brandon Park; Attendance: 3,257

=== NSL Cup ===
20 November 1991 First round	Newcastle Breakers	0–3	Marconi Fairfield	Newcastle
		Report	van Egmond 25'; Seal 50'; Markovski 87'	Stadium: Austral Park; Attendance: 1,024; Referee: Peter Spiers

== Statistics ==
=== Appearances and goals ===
Players with no appearances not included in the list.

No.	Pos.	Nat.	Name	National Soccer League		NSL Cup		Total	
No.	Pos.	Nat.	Name	Apps	Goals	Apps	Goals	Apps	Goals
—	FW	(Australia)	Dean Adamson	0	0	1	0	1	0
—	FW	(New Zealand)	Noel Barkley	8	3	0	0	8	3
—	FW	(Netherlands)	Piere Essers	1	0	0	0	1	0
—	GK	(Australia)	Mike Gibson	16	0	0	0	16	0
—	MF	(Australia)	Troy Halpin	0(3)	0	0	0	3	0
—	MF	(Scotland)	Ian Heddle	26	0	0	0	26	0
—	MF	(Australia)	Darren Hillier	12(2)	0	1	0	15	0
—	DF	(Australia)	John Koch	24(2)	7	0	0	26	7
—	MF	(Australia)	Andrew Koczka	25	4	0	0	25	4
—	GK	(Australia)	Sean Lahiff	5	0	0	0	5	0
—	DF	(Australia)	Dominic Longo	20	0	0	0	20	0
—	DF	(Australia)	Ralph Maier	21(1)	1	1	0	23	1
—	MF	(Australia)	Brad Maloney	21(5)	4	1	0	27	4
—	MF	(Australia)	Nick Meredith	20(3)	4	1	0	24	4
—	DF	(Australia)	Craig Moffitt	25	2	1	0	26	2
—	DF	(Australia)	Bobby Naumov	12(10)	0	1	0	23	0
—	DF	(Australia)	Darren Northam	16(2)	1	1	0	19	1
—	MF	(Australia)	Andy Roberts	22(3)	0	1	0	26	0
—	GK	(Australia)	John Russell	5	0	1	0	6	0
—	DF	(Australia)	Andrew Stowell	3(1)	0	0	0	4	0
—	MF	(New Zealand)	Colin Tuaa	4(3)	1	1	0	8	1

=== Clean sheets ===
Rank	No.	Pos	Nat	Name	National Soccer League	NSL Cup	Total
1	—	GK	(Australia)	Mike Gibson	3	0	3
2	—	GK	(Australia)	John Russell	2	0	2
Total					5	0	5
