= 1992–93 Newcastle Breakers FC season =

Newcastle Breakers
1992–93 season
- Stadium: Breakers Stadium
- National Soccer League: 8th
- NSL Cup: First round
- Top goalscorer: League: Warren Spink (15); All: Warren Spink (15)
- Highest home attendance: 6,527 vs. Marconi Fairfield (12 February 1993); National Soccer League
- Lowest home attendance: 1,333 vs. Parramatta Eagles (11 November 1992); NSL Cup
- Average home league attendance: 3,679
- Biggest win: 5–0 vs. Brisbane United (26 December 1992); National Soccer League
- Biggest defeat: 0–2 vs. South Melbourne (30 October 1992); National Soccer League; 1–3 vs. Marconi Fairfield (12 February 1993); National Soccer League

The 1992–93 season was the second season in the history of Newcastle Breakers. It was also the second season in the National Soccer League. In addition to the domestic league, they also participated in the NSL Cup. Newcastle Breakers finished 8th in their National Soccer League season, and were eliminated in the NSL Cup first round by Parramatta Eagles.

== Players ==
Note: Flags indicate national team as defined under FIFA eligibility rules; some limited exceptions apply. Players may hold more than one non-FIFA nationality.

No.	Pos.	Nation	Player
—	FW	AUS	Rod Brown
—	GK	AUS	Mike Gibson
—	MF	AUS	Troy Halpin
—	DF	AUS	John Koch
—	MF	AUS	Andrew Koczka
—	DF	AUS	Ralph Maier
—	MF	AUS	Brad Maloney
—	MF	AUS	Nick Meredith
—	DF	AUS	Craig Moffitt

No.	Pos.	Nation	Player
—	DF	AUS	Bobby Naumov
—	DF	AUS	Darren Northam
—	MF	AUS	Jason Polak
—	DF	AUS	Andy Roberts
—	FW	AUS	Warren Spink
—	MF	AUS	Glenn Sprod
—	DF	AUS	Darren Stewart
—	MF	AUS	Mark Wilson

== Competitions ==
=== Overview ===
Competition	First match	Last match	Starting round	Final position	Record							
Competition	First match	Last match	Starting round	Final position	Pld	W	D	L	GF	GA	GD	Win %
National Soccer League	2 October 1992	4 April 1993	Matchday 1	8th	26	10	8	8	38	29	+9	38.46
NSL Cup	11 November 1992	9 December 1992	First round	First round	2	0	1	1	3	4	−1	0.00
Total					28	10	9	9	41	33	+8	35.71

Last updated: complete
Source: Competitions

=== National Soccer League ===
==== League table ====
Pos	Team	Pld	W	D	L	GF	GA	GD	Pts	Qualification or relegation
1	South Melbourne	26	18	4	4	51	23	+28	58	Qualification for the Finals series
2	Marconi Fairfield (C)	26	17	2	7	57	31	+26	53	Qualification for the Finals series
3	Adelaide City	26	12	5	9	37	34	+3	41	Qualification for the Finals series
4	Wollongong City	26	11	6	9	33	27	+6	39	Qualification for the Finals series
5	West Adelaide	26	12	3	11	43	39	+4	39	Qualification for the Finals series
6	Parramatta Eagles	26	11	6	9	39	41	−2	39	Qualification for the Finals series
7	Sydney CSC	26	12	3	11	36	41	−5	39	
8	Newcastle Breakers	26	10	8	8	38	29	+9	38	
9	Sydney Olympic	26	10	4	12	36	31	+5	34	
10	Melbourne Croatia	26	10	4	12	38	39	−1	34	
11	Heidelberg United	26	7	9	10	30	40	−10	30	
12	Morwell Falcons	26	7	7	12	29	43	−14	28	
13	Preston Makedonia (R)	26	6	4	16	28	45	−17	18 (Note: Preston Makedonia deducted 4 points for crowd disturbances.)	Relegation to the Victorian Premier League
14	Brisbane United	26	5	3	18	32	64	−32	18	

Updated to match(es) played on unknown. Source: rsssf.com
Rules for classification: 1) points; 2) goal difference; 3) number of goals scored.
(C) Champions; (R) Relegated

==== Results summary ====
Overall								Home						Away					
Pld	W	D	L	GF	GA	GD	Pts	W	D	L	GF	GA	GD	W	D	L	GF	GA	GD
26	10	8	8	38	29	+9	38	5	5	3	20	16	+4	5	3	5	18	13	+5

Source: worldfootball.net

==== Results by round ====
Round	1	2	3	4	5	6	7	8	9	10	11	12	13	14	15	16	17	18	19	20	21	22	23	24	25	26
Ground	H	A	H	A	H	A	A	H	A	H	A	H	A	H	A	A	H	A	H	H	A	H	A	H	A	H
Result	D	L	D	W	L	D	L	D	L	L	D	W	W	D	L	W	W	D	W	L	W	D	L	W	W	W
Position	7	12	12	8	12	12	12	11	11	12	12	11	11	11	11	10	9	9	8	8	8	9	10	10	8	8

Source: worldfootball.net
A = Away; H = Home; W = Win; D = Draw; L = Loss

==== Matches ====
2 October 1992 1	Newcastle Breakers	0–0	Wollongong City	Newcastle
		Report		Stadium: Breakers Stadium; Attendance: 3,678

11 October 1992 2	Sydney Olympic	1–0	Newcastle Breakers	Sydney
	Katholos (?)	Report		Stadium: St George Stadium; Attendance: 4,250

16 October 1992 3	Newcastle Breakers	1–1	West Adelaide	Newcastle
	Spink (?)	Report	Iriarte (?)	Stadium: Breakers Stadium; Attendance: 2,752

23 October 1992 4	Sydney CSC	1–2	Newcastle Breakers	Sydney
	Gibson (?)	Report	Stewart (?); Spink (?)	Stadium: Edensor Park; Attendance: 1,859

30 October 1992 5	Newcastle Breakers	0–2	South Melbourne	Newcastle
		Report	Boutsianis (?); Awaritefe (?)	Stadium: Breakers Stadium; Attendance: 3,891

8 November 1992 6	Preston Makedonia	0–0	Newcastle Breakers	Melbourne
		Report		Stadium: B.T. Connor Reserve; Attendance: 2,968

14 November 1992 7	Marconi Fairfield	1–0	Newcastle Breakers	Sydney
	Harper (?)	Report		Stadium: Marconi Stadium; Attendance: 2,657

20 November 1992 8	Newcastle Breakers	0–0	Morwell Falcons	Newcastle
		Report		Stadium: Breakers Stadium; Attendance: 3,280

29 November 1992 9	Parramatta Eagles	1–0	Newcastle Breakers	Sydney
	Genc (?)	Report		Stadium: Melita Stadium; Attendance: 2,324

6 December 1992 10	Newcastle Breakers	1–2	Adelaide City	Newcastle
	Spink (?)	Report	Melta (?); Mullen (?)	Stadium: Breakers Stadium; Attendance: 2,880

13 December 1992 11	Heidelberg United	1–1	Newcastle Breakers	Melbourne
	Hunter (?)	Report	Maloney (?)	Stadium: Olympic Village; Attendance: 2,450

23 December 1992 12	Newcastle Breakers	3–2	Melbourne Croatia	Newcastle
	Maloney (?); Spink (?)	Report	Marth (?); Vanis (?)	Stadium: Breakers Stadium; Attendance: 2,996

26 December 1992 13	Brisbane United	0–5	Newcastle Breakers	Brisbane
		Report	Koczka (?); Polak (?); Spink (?); Koch (?)	Stadium: Perry Park; Attendance: 1,938

1 January 1993 14	Newcastle Breakers	1–1	Sydney Olympic	Newcastle
	Spink (?)	Report	Arambasic (?)	Stadium: Breakers Stadium; Attendance: 6,036

8 January 1993 15	Wollongong City	2–1	Newcastle Breakers	Wollongong
	Laus (?); (unknown) (?)	Report	Maloney (?)	Stadium: Brandon Park; Attendance: 2,448

17 January 1993 16	West Adelaide	1–2	Newcastle Breakers	Adelaide
	Hooker (?)	Report	Sprod (?); (unknown) (?)	Stadium: Hindmarsh Stadium; Attendance: 4,100

22 January 1993 17	Newcastle Breakers	3–1	Sydney CSC	Newcastle
	Stewart (?); Meredith (?); Brown (?)	Report	Krslovic (?)	Stadium: Breakers Stadium; Attendance: 2,425

1 February 1993 18	South Melbourne	1–1	Newcastle Breakers	Melbourne
	Awaritefe (?)	Report	Spink (?)	Stadium: Middle Park; Attendance: 3,196

5 February 1993 19	Newcastle Breakers	4–1	Preston Makedonia	Newcastle
	Stewart (?); Spink (?); Brown (?)	Report	Trajanovski (?)	Stadium: Breakers Stadium; Attendance: 4,246

12 February 1993 20	Newcastle Breakers	1–3	Marconi Fairfield	Newcastle
	Polak (?)	Report	Jolevski (?); Taliadoros (?); Harper (?)	Stadium: Breakers Stadium; Attendance: 6,527

21 February 1993 21	Morwell Falcons	1–2	Newcastle Breakers	Morwell
	Becvinovski (?)	Report	Brown (?)	Stadium: Falcons Park; Attendance: 2,142

26 February 1993 22	Newcastle Breakers	2–2	Parramatta Eagles	Newcastle
	Stewart (?); Meredith (?)	Report	Gunning (?); Foster (?)	Stadium: Breakers Stadium; Attendance: 4,019

7 March 1993 23	Adelaide City	2–1	Newcastle Breakers	Adelaide
	Veart (?); Barbaro (?)	Report	Spink (?)	Stadium: Norwood Oval; Attendance: 1,708

12 March 1993 24	Newcastle Breakers	2–0	Heidelberg United	Newcastle
	Spink (?)	Report		Stadium: Breakers Stadium; Attendance: 2,389

21 March 1993 25	Melbourne Croatia	1–3	Newcastle Breakers	Melbourne
	Marth (?)	Report	Meredith (?); Maloney (?); Polak (?)	Stadium: Somers St Stadium; Attendance: 2,897

4 April 1993 26	Newcastle Breakers	2–1	Brisbane United	Newcastle
	Spink (?)	Report	Slater (?)	Stadium: Breakers Stadium; Attendance: 2,710

=== NSL Cup ===
11 November 1992 First round 1st Leg	Newcastle Breakers	2–2	Parramatta Eagles	Newcastle
	Brown 43'; Stewart 52'	Report	Gomez 81'; Mendez 90+1'	Stadium: Breakers Stadium; Attendance: 1,333; Referee: Peter Spiers

9 December 1992 First round 2nd Leg	Parramatta Eagles	2–1	Newcastle Breakers	Sydney
	Genc 44'; Mendez (?)	Report	Naumov (?)	Stadium: Melita Stadium; Referee: Richard Lorenc

== Statistics ==
=== Appearances and goals ===
Players with no appearances not included in the list.

No.	Pos.	Nat.	Name	National Soccer League		NSL Cup		Total	
No.	Pos.	Nat.	Name	Apps	Goals	Apps	Goals	Apps	Goals
—	FW	(Australia)	Rod Brown	20	4	1	1	21	5
—	GK	(Australia)	Mike Gibson	26	0	2	0	28	0
—	MF	(Australia)	Troy Halpin	3	0	0	0	3	0
—	DF	(Australia)	John Koch	17(2)	1	2	0	21	1
—	MF	(Australia)	Andrew Koczka	15	1	1	0	16	1
—	DF	(Australia)	Ralph Maier	26	0	2	0	28	0
—	MF	(Australia)	Brad Maloney	14	4	1	0	15	4
—	MF	(Australia)	Nick Meredith	21(1)	3	0	0	22	3
—	DF	(Australia)	Craig Moffitt	25	0	1	0	26	0
—	DF	(Australia)	Bobby Naumov	9(16)	0	2	1	27	1
—	DF	(Australia)	Darren Northam	1	0	1	0	2	0
—	MF	(Australia)	Jason Polak	25	4	2	0	27	4
—	DF	(Australia)	Andy Roberts	19(7)	0	2	0	28	0
—	FW	(Australia)	Warren Spink	23	15	2	0	25	15
—	MF	(Australia)	Glenn Sprod	19(2)	1	1(1)	0	23	1
—	DF	(Australia)	Darren Stewart	23	4	2	1	25	5
—	MF	(Australia)	Mark Wilson	0(2)	0	0	0	2	0

=== Clean sheets ===
Rank	No.	Pos	Nat	Name	National Soccer League	NSL Cup	Total
1	—	GK	(Australia)	Mike Gibson	5	0	5
Total					5	0	5
