= List of Newcastle Breakers FC seasons =

Newcastle Breakers Football Club was an Australian semi-professional association football club based in Newcastle. The club was formed in 1991 and joined the National Soccer League in the 1991–92, season until they became defunct in 2000. The club's first team spent eight seasons in the National Soccer League. The table details the club's achievements in major competitions, and the top scorers for each season.

== History ==
With no representing team from Newcastle in the National Soccer League since Newcastle Rosebud United (now Adamstown Rosebud) in 1986, the Newcastle Breakers joined the league in the 1991–92 season and finished 11th out of 14 while only being eliminated in the first round of the NSL Cup. The team would go closer to the Finals series spot the next season finishing 8th, but until then more failures started to qualify for the Finals series in the next few seasons. Although the team did not participate in the league in the 1994–95 season; the 1995–96 campaign saw new manager John Kosmina, the team finishing bottom of the league and having the most losses in an NSL season of 24, however reaching the NSL Cup Final defeated by South Melbourne in the same season. The next two seasons were also fails to qualify for the Finals series as the NSL Cup had been demised from 1997 onwards. From the 1998–99 season, it would be the last two seasons of the club's existence with better league finishes but still missing the Finals series meaning that the club had never qualified for the Finals series of every eight seasons played which caused the demise of the club leading to the formation of new club Newcastle United (now Newcastle Jets).

== Key ==
Key to league competitions:

- National Soccer League (NSL) – Australia's former top football league, established in 1977 and dissolved in 2004.

Key to colours and symbols:

1st or W	Winners
2nd or RU	Runners-up
3rd	Third place
♦	Top scorer in division

Key to league record:

- Season = The year and article of the season
- Pos = Final position
- Pld = Matches played
- W = Matches won
- D = Matches drawn
- L = Matches lost
- GF = Goals scored
- GA = Goals against
- Pts = Points

== Seasons ==
Results of league and cup competitions by season
Season	Division	Pld	W	D	L	GF	GA	Pts	Pos	Finals	NSL Cup	Name(s)	Goals
Season	League									Finals	NSL Cup	Top goalscorer(s)	
1991–92	NSL	26	7	8	11	28	39	22	11th	DNQ	R1	John Koch	7
1992–93	NSL	26	10	8	8	38	29	38	8th	DNQ	R1	Warren Spink	15
1993–94	NSL	26	5	8	13	30	47	23	12th	DNQ	R1	Warren Spink	13
1995–96	NSL	33	4	5	24	35	77	17	12th	DNQ	RU	Jason Bennett	8
1996–97	NSL	26	7	9	10	40	46	30	11th	DNQ	QF	Jason Bennett; Robert Ironside	7
1997–98	NSL	26	4	9	13	30	50	21	13th	DNQ	—	Clayton Zane	8
1998–99	NSL	28	11	7	10	29	33	40	8th	DNQ	—	John Buonavoglia	6
1999–2000	NSL	34	14	9	11	44	44	51	7th	DNQ	—	John Buonavoglia	16
