= List of Newcastle Breakers FC players =

Newcastle Breakers Football Club, an association football club based in Birmingham Gardens, Newcastle was founded in 1991. They became the third Newcastle member admitted into the National Soccer League in 1991 and dissolved in 2000. All players who have played in at least one match are listed below.

Andy Roberts held the record for the greatest number of appearances for Newcastle Breakers. The Australian defender played 169 times for the club. The club's goalscoring record was held by Warren Spink who scored 28 goals.

== Key ==
- The list is ordered first by date of debut, and then if necessary in alphabetical order.
- Appearances as a substitute are included.

Positions key
GK	Goalkeeper
DF	Defender
MF	Midfielder
FW	Forward

Nationality
Unless otherwise noted, the nationality of a player is determined by the country/countries which he has played for, or if said person has not played international football, their country of birth.
Position
Playing positions are listed according to the tactical formations that were employed at the time.
Club career
Club career is defined as the first and last calendar years in which the player appeared for the club in any of the competitions listed below.
Total appearances and Total goals
Total appearances and goals comprise those in the National Soccer League and NSL Cup.

== Players ==
List of Newcastle Breakers FC players
Player	Nationality	Pos	Club career	Starts	Subs	Total	Goals
Player	Nationality	Pos	Club career	Appearances			Goals
Noel Barkley	New Zealand	FW	1991	8	0	8	3
Ian Heddle	Scotland	MF	1991–1992	26	0	26	0
John Koch	Australia	DF	1991–1993	43	4	47	8
Andrew Koczka	Australia	MF	1991–1993	41	0	41	5
Sean Lahiff	Australia	GK	1991	5	0	5	0
Dominic Longo	Australia	DF	1991–1992	20	0	20	0
Ralph Maier	Australia	DF	1991–1996	111	3	114	3
Brad Maloney	Australia	MF	1991–1993	37	5	42	8
Nick Meredith	Australia	MF	1991–1994	55	5	60	8
Craig Moffitt	Australia	DF	1991–1993	52	0	52	0
Bobby Naumov	Australia	DF	1991–1994	42	33	75	3
Darren Northam	Australia	DF	1991–1992	19	2	21	1
Colin Tuaa	New Zealand	FW	1991–1992	5	3	8	1
Andy Roberts	Australia	DF	1991–1997; 1998–2000	147	22	169	3
John Russell	Australia	GK	1991–1992	6	0	6	0
Dean Adamson	Australia	–	1991	1	0	1	0
Darren Hillier	Australia	MF	1991–1992	13	2	15	0
Michael Gibson	Australia	GK	1991–1993	44	0	44	0
Piere Essers	Netherlands	FW	1992	1	0	1	0
Troy Halpin	Australia	MF	1992–1994; 1995–1998	65	15	80	12
Andrew Stowell	Australia	DF	1992	3	1	4	0
Jason Polak	Australia	MF	1992–1993	27	0	27	4
Darren Stewart	Australia	DF	1992–1994; 1995–1996	50	0	50	6
Rod Brown	Australia	FW	1992–1994	47	0	47	13
Glenn Sprod	Australia	MF	1992–1993; 1995–2000	147	13	160	9
Warren Spink	Australia	FW	1992–1994	49	0	49	28
Mark Wilson	Australia	DF	1993–1994; 1996–2000	81	22	103	10
Clint Gosling	New Zealand	GK	1993–1994	28	0	28	0
Graham Jennings	Australia	DF	1993–1994	27	0	27	2
David Lowe	Australia	MF	1993–1997	55	9	64	10
Neil Owens	Australia	DF	1993–1994	21	4	25	0
Scott Wells	Australia	MF	1993	3	2	5	0
John McQuarrie	Australia	MF	1993–1994	17	2	19	1
Robbie Middleby	Australia	MF	1993–1994	1	4	5	0
Mark Jones	Australia	MF	1993–1994	17	2	19	1
Howard Tredinnick	Australia	FW	1993–1994	17	0	17	1
Lawrie McKinna	Scotland	FW	1993–1994	1	7	8	0
Gary Wilson	Australia	MF	1994–1997	15	4	19	0
Harry James	Australia	FW	1994–1997	18	12	30	3
Jason Bennett	Australia	FW	1995–1998	64	6	70	17
Damien Brown	Australia	DF	1995–1996	12	5	17	2
Craig Carter	Australia	GK	1995–1996	27	0	27	0
Steve Hickman	Australia	DF	1995–1996	31	2	33	2
Craig Sharpley	Australia	MF	1995–1997	34	11	45	1
Clayton Zane	Australia	FW	1995–1998	63	9	72	17
Scott Thomas	Australia	MF	1995–1997	37	12	49	5
Adam Fittock	Australia	GK	1995–1996	11	3	14	0
Shane Pryce	Australia	DF	1995–2000	132	3	135	18
Glenn Moore	Australia	DF	1995–2000	42	3	45	3
Nick Johns	Australia	DF	1995–1996	1	5	6	0
Peter Ritchie	Australia	MF	1996–1999	71	9	80	2
Ryan Smith	Australia	DF	1996	2	1	3	0
Linkon Knott	Australia	DF	1996	0	2	2	0
Matthew Austin	Australia	DF	1996–1998	41	3	44	1
Liam Baker	Australia	GK	1996–1999	35	0	35	0
Brett Eldridge	Australia	FW	1996	2	1	3	1
Robert Ironside	New Zealand	MF	1996–1998	46	0	46	9
Todd McManus	Australia	DF	1996–2000	114	0	114	3
Evis Heath	Australia	MF	1996	0	4	4	2
Liam McGuire	Australia	FW	1996–1998	13	13	26	4
Brad Swancott	Australia	GK	1997–1998	21	0	21	0
Ben Lane	Australia	MF	1997–1998	4	8	12	1
Doug West	Australia	DF	1997–1998	9	7	16	0
Michael Williams	Australia	MF	1997	1	2	3	0
Matthew Lowe	Australia	MF	1997–1998	15	5	20	1
Shaun Edwards	England	DF	1997–1998	8	2	10	0
Reece Tollenaere	Australia	FW	1998	10	0	10	5
Leo Langone	Argentina	MF	1998	8	0	8	1
Fouad Umlil	Morocco	MF	1998–1999	17	13	30	2
Andrew Borghetto	Australia	FW	1998	1	0	1	0
Bob Catlin	Australia	GK	1998–2000	61	0	61	0
Tom Haythornthwaite	Australia	DF	1998–1999	18	3	21	4
Robert Shannon	Scotland	DF	1998–1999	27	0	27	1
Chris Tanchevski	Australia	FW	1998–2000	2	30	32	1
Brad Wieczorek	Australia	FW	1998–2000	44	3	47	3
John Buonavoglia	Australia	FW	1998–2000	62	0	62	22
Greg Owens	Australia	MF	1998–2000	23	19	42	5
Yoon Sang-chul	South Korea	DF	1998–1999	16	7	23	4
Joshua Maguire	Australia	MF	1998–1999	0	7	7	0
Joshua Ferguson	Australia	DF	1999–2000	1	1	2	0
Tony Bauer	Australia	FW	1999	0	2	2	0
Robert Angievski	Australia	MF	1999–2000	2	8	10	1
Travis Dodd	Australia	FW	1999–2000	28	4	32	2
Andy Harper	Australia	FW	1999–2000	31	0	31	0
Peter Juchniewicz	Australia	FW	1999–2000	3	8	11	1
Luke Tomich	Australia	FW	1999–2000	2	7	9	0
Vasko Trpcevski	Australia	MF	1999–2000	12	14	26	0
Chad Mansley	Australia	FW	1999	0	1	1	0
Damien Smith	Australia	MF	1999–2000	2	19	21	0
