= 1996–97 Newcastle Breakers FC season =

Newcastle Breakers
1996–97 season
- Stadium: Breakers Stadium
- National Soccer League: 11th
- NSL Cup: Quarter-finals
- Top goalscorer: League: Jason Bennett; Troy Halpin (5); All: Jason Bennett; Robert Ironside (7)
- Highest home attendance: 6,154 vs. Wollongong City (21 February 1997); National Soccer League
- Lowest home attendance: 1,370 vs. Collingwood Warriors (22 November 1996); National Soccer League
- Average home league attendance: 4,177
- Biggest win: 7–1 vs. Northern NSW Lions (12 September 1996); NSL Cup
- Biggest defeat: 1–6 vs. Brisbane Strikers (19 October 1996); National Soccer League

The 1996–97 season was the fifth season in the history of Newcastle Breakers. It was also the fifth season in the National Soccer League. In addition to the domestic league, they also participated in the NSL Cup. Newcastle Breakers finished 11th in their National Soccer League season, and were eliminated in the NSL Cup quarter-finals by Marconi Fairfield.

== Players ==
Note: Flags indicate national team as defined under FIFA eligibility rules; some limited exceptions apply. Players may hold more than one non-FIFA nationality.

No.	Pos.	Nation	Player
1	GK	AUS	Adam Fittock
2	DF	AUS	Shane Pryce
3	MF	AUS	Glenn Sprod
4	DF	AUS	Glen Moore
5	MF	AUS	Peter Ritchie
6	MF	NZL	Robert Ironside
7	MF	AUS	Scott Thomas
8	MF	AUS	David Lowe (Captain)
9	FW	AUS	Clayton Zane
10	MF	AUS	Troy Halpin
11	MF	AUS	Gary Wilson
12	DF	AUS	Todd McManus

No.	Pos.	Nation	Player
13	DF	AUS	Andy Roberts
14	FW	AUS	Jason Bennett
15	MF	AUS	Mark Wilson
16	MF	AUS	Craig Sharpley
17	DF	AUS	Matthew Austin
18	FW	AUS	Harry James
19	FW	AUS	Liam McGuire
20	GK	AUS	Liam Baker
21	MF	AUS	Evis Heath
—	FW	AUS	Brett Eldridge
—	GK	AUS	Brad Swancott

== Competitions ==
=== Overview ===
Competition	First match	Last match	Starting round	Final position	Record							
Competition	First match	Last match	Starting round	Final position	Pld	W	D	L	GF	GA	GD	Win %
National Soccer League	11 October 1996	20 April 1997	Matchday 1	11th	26	7	9	10	40	46	−6	26.92
NSL Cup	12 January 1996	27 January 1996	Round of 16	Quarter-finals	3	2	0	1	13	5	+8	66.67
Total					29	9	9	11	53	51	+2	31.03

Last updated: complete
Source: Competitions

=== National Soccer League ===
==== League table ====
Pos	Team	Pld	W	D	L	GF	GA	GD	Pts	Qualification
1	Sydney United	26	17	5	4	67	33	+34	56	Qualification for the Finals series
2	Brisbane Strikers (C)	26	15	2	9	55	40	+15	47	Qualification for the Finals series
3	South Melbourne	26	14	4	8	39	25	+14	46	Qualification for the Finals series
4	Adelaide City	26	11	10	5	32	22	+10	43	Qualification for the Finals series
5	Marconi Fairfield	26	12	4	10	41	37	+4	40	Qualification for the Finals series
6	Melbourne Knights	26	11	6	9	36	32	+4	39	Qualification for the Finals series
7	Perth Glory	26	11	5	10	48	41	+7	38	
8	West Adelaide	26	10	3	13	39	51	−12	33	
9	UTS Olympic	26	8	8	10	41	46	−5	32	
10	Wollongong Wolves	26	8	8	10	42	48	−6	32	
11	Newcastle Breakers	26	7	9	10	40	46	−6	30	
12	Gippsland Falcons	26	8	6	12	33	41	−8	30	
13	Collingwood Warriors	26	6	9	11	32	44	−12	27	
14	Canberra Cosmos	26	2	5	19	30	69	−39	11	

Updated to match(es) played on unknown. Source: rsssf.com
Rules for classification: 1) points; 2) goal difference; 3) number of goals scored.
(C) Champions

==== Results summary ====
Overall								Home						Away					
Pld	W	D	L	GF	GA	GD	Pts	W	D	L	GF	GA	GD	W	D	L	GF	GA	GD
26	7	9	10	40	46	−6	30	6	4	3	30	23	+7	1	5	7	10	23	−13

Source: worldfootball.net

==== Results by round ====
Round	1	2	3	4	5	6	7	8	9	10	11	12	13	14	15	16	17	18	19	20	21	22	23	24	25	26
Ground	H	A	H	A	H	A	H	A	H	A	H	A	A	H	A	H	A	H	A	H	A	H	A	H	A	H
Result	W	L	L	D	D	L	D	L	D	L	W	D	D	D	L	W	W	W	D	L	D	L	L	W	L	W
Position	1	7	9	10	10	10	10	13	13	13	11	13	12	11	12	11	11	10	10	12	12	12	12	11	11	11

Source: worldfootball.net
A = Away; H = Home; W = Win; D = Draw; L = Loss

==== Matches ====
11 October 1996 1	Newcastle Breakers	6–1	West Adelaide	Newcastle
	Bennett 62', 67', 69', 72'; Thomas 78'; Sprod 80'	Report	Perin 55'	Stadium: Breakers Stadium; Attendance: 4,581; Referee: Con Diomis

19 October 1996 2	Brisbane Strikers	6–1	Newcastle Breakers	Brisbane
	Brown 10', 61', 80'; S. Cranney 40'; Phillips 65'; Farina 90' (pen.)	Report	Sprod 24' (pen.)	Stadium: Suncorp Stadium; Attendance: 4,572; Referee: Mark Shield

26 October 1996 3	Newcastle Breakers	1–3	Perth Glory	Newcastle
	Wilson 26'	Report	Strudwick 31'; Despotovski 33', 82'	Stadium: Breakers Stadium; Attendance: 3,750; Referee: Simon Micallef

1 November 1996 19	Canberra Cosmos	1–1	Newcastle Breakers	Canberra
	Dee 90'	Report	Zane 74'	Stadium: Bruce Stadium; Attendance: 9,421; Referee: Matthew Breeze

3 November 1996 4	Wollongong City	0–0	Newcastle Breakers	Wollongong
		Report		Stadium: Brandon Park; Attendance: 3,484; Referee: John Markovski

8 November 1996 5	Newcastle Breakers	2–2	Canberra Cosmos	Newcastle
	Halpin 33'; Sprod 46'	Report	Buljan 18'; Koch 68'	Stadium: Breakers Stadium; Attendance: 3,107; Referee: D. Crawford

17 November 1996 6	South Melbourne	1–0	Newcastle Breakers	Melbourne
	Kelic 26'	Report		Stadium: Lakeside Stadium; Attendance: 5,335; Referee: Eugene Brazzale

22 November 1996 7	Newcastle Breakers	1–1	Collingwood Warriors	Newcastle
	Zane 1'	Report	MacNicol 25'	Stadium: Breakers Stadium; Attendance: 1,370; Referee: Mark Shield

29 November 1996 8	Melbourne Knights	2–0	Newcastle Breakers	Melbourne
	Simunic 46'; Kutlesovski 62'	Report		Stadium: Somers St Stadium; Attendance: 2,794; Referee: Con Diomis

6 December 1996 9	Newcastle Breakers	2–2	Gippsland Falcons	Newcastle
	Palamaras 18' (o.g.); Wilson 50'	Report	Krncevic 15'; Duric 66'	Stadium: Breakers Stadium; Attendance: 2,231; Referee: Simon Micallef

14 December 1996 10	Marconi Fairfield	2–1	Newcastle Breakers	Sydney
	Maloney 20'; Zoric 59'	Report	Halpin 69'	Stadium: Marconi Stadium; Attendance: 4,111; Referee: John Markovski

20 December 1996 11	Newcastle Breakers	3–1	Sydney United	Newcastle
	Pryce 68'; Zane 70'; Bennett 74'	Report	Milicic 54'	Stadium: Breakers Stadium; Attendance: 4,225; Referee: Matthew Breeze

29 December 1996 12	UTS Olympic	2–2	Newcastle Breakers	Sydney
	Barrett 65'; Trajanovski 67'	Report	Meredith 64' (o.g.); Ironside 89'	Stadium: Belmore Oval; Attendance: 5,128; Referee: Con Diomis

5 January 1997 13	Adelaide City	2–2	Newcastle Breakers	Adelaide
	Gibson 20'; Brooks 52'	Report	McGuire 37'; Halpin 60'	Stadium: Hindmarsh Stadium; Attendance: 3,365; Referee: W. Dade

10 January 1997 14	Newcastle Breakers	1–1	Adelaide City	Newcastle
	Pryce 50' (pen.)	Report	Gibson 23'	Stadium: Breakers Stadium; Attendance: 5,834; Referee: D. Crawford

2 February 1997 15	West Adelaide	2–1	Newcastle Breakers	Adelaide
	Hooker 59' (pen.); Tsekinis 68'	Report	Tibaldi 4' (o.g.)	Stadium: Hindmarsh Stadium; Attendance: 5,044; Referee: A. Gorton

7 February 1997 16	Newcastle Breakers	3–1	Brisbane Strikers	Newcastle
	Pryce 2' (pen.); Sprod 51'; Hews 63' (o.g.)	Report	Brown 47'	Stadium: Breakers Stadium; Attendance: 6,102; Referee: Matthew Breeze

15 February 1997 17	Perth Glory	0–2	Newcastle Breakers	Perth
		Report	McGuire 12'; Wilson 51'	Stadium: Perth Oval; Attendance: 11,546; Referee: W. Dade

21 February 1997 18	Newcastle Breakers	1–0	Wollongong City	Newcastle
	Halpin 45'	Report		Stadium: Breakers Stadium; Attendance: 6,154; Referee: Con Diomis

8 March 1997 20	Newcastle Breakers	0–4	South Melbourne	Newcastle
		Report	Coveny 49'; Orlic 57'; Kelic 83'; Spink 89'	Stadium: Breakers Stadium; Attendance: 4,556; Referee: G. Leverton

16 March 1997 21	Collingwood Warriors	0–0	Newcastle Breakers	Melbourne
		Report		Stadium: Victoria Park; Attendance: 3,311; Referee: G. Leverton

21 March 1997 22	Newcastle Breakers	1–2	Melbourne Knights	Newcastle
	Zane 41'	Report	Pondeljak 2'; Marth 5'	Stadium: Breakers Stadium; Attendance: 3,907; Referee: Gerry Connolly

29 March 1997 23	Gippsland Falcons	3–0	Newcastle Breakers	Morwell
	Sekulic 5', 14', 61'	Report		Stadium: Falcons Park; Attendance: 4,167; Referee: John Markovski

4 April 1997 24	Newcastle Breakers	5–2	Marconi Fairfield	Newcastle
	Ironside 36'; Pryce 69'; Lowe 71'; Austin 75'; Halpin 84'	Report	Maloney 46'; Harper 72'	Stadium: Breakers Stadium; Attendance: 4,465; Referee: Matthew Breeze

13 April 1997 25	Sydney United	2–0	Newcastle Breakers	Sydney
	Milicic 49'; Marusic 75'	Report		Stadium: Edensor Park; Attendance: 5,179; Referee: Eddie Lennie

20 April 1997 26	Newcastle Breakers	4–3	UTS Olympic	Newcastle
	Lowe 9'; Ironside 35', 85'; Sharpley 58'	Report	Mitchell 48'; Trajanovski 53'; Ardone 76'	Stadium: Breakers Stadium; Attendance: 4,022; Referee: Con Diomis

=== NSL Cup ===
12 September 1996 Round of 16 – First leg	Northern NSW Lions	1–7	Newcastle Breakers	Newcastle
	Tredinnick 56'	Report	Bennett 3', 70'; Ironside 56'; Sprod 75'; Eldridge 81'; Heath 83', 89'	Stadium: Jack McLaughlin Reserve; Referee: G. Leverton

18 September 1996 Round of 16 – Second leg	Newcastle Breakers	5–1	Northern NSW Lions	Newcastle
	Pryce 12'; Halpin 44'; Ironside 56'; Lowe 73'; McGuire 85'	Report	Bailey 18'	Stadium: Breakers Stadium; Referee: Matthew Breeze

21 September 1996 Quarter-finals	Marconi Fairfield	3–1	Newcastle Breakers	Sydney
	Awaritefe 24', 38'; Maloney 43'	Report	Ironside 76'	Stadium: Marconi Stadium; Referee: Simon Micallef

== Statistics ==
=== Appearances and goals ===
Players with no appearances not included in the list.

No.	Pos.	Nat.	Name	National Soccer League		NSL Cup		Total	
No.	Pos.	Nat.	Name	Apps	Goals	Apps	Goals	Apps	Goals
2	DF	(Australia)	Shane Pryce	23(1)	4	1	1	25	5
3	MF	(Australia)	Glenn Sprod	25	4	3	1	28	5
4	DF	(Australia)	Glen Moore	4(1)	0	2	0	7	0
5	MF	(Australia)	Peter Ritchie	14(3)	0	0	0	17	0
6	MF	(New Zealand)	Robert Ironside	21	4	3	3	24	7
7	MF	(Australia)	Scott Thomas	16(6)	1	0	0	22	1
8	MF	(Australia)	David Lowe	7(3)	2	3	1	13	3
9	FW	(Australia)	Clayton Zane	18(1)	4	0	0	19	4
10	MF	(Australia)	Troy Halpin	24	5	3	1	27	6
11	MF	(Australia)	Gary Wilson	2(1)	0	0	0	3	0
12	DF	(Australia)	Todd McManus	25	0	3	0	28	0
13	DF	(Australia)	Andy Roberts	9(2)	0	0	0	11	0
14	FW	(Australia)	Jason Bennett	14(2)	5	1	2	17	7
15	MF	(Australia)	Mark Wilson	12(2)	3	3	0	17	3
16	MF	(Australia)	Craig Sharpley	11(5)	1	0(2)	0	18	1
17	DF	(Australia)	Matthew Austin	21(1)	1	3	0	25	1
18	FW	(Australia)	Harry James	6(8)	0	3	0	17	0
19	FW	(Australia)	Liam McGuire	8(5)	2	0(3)	1	16	3
20	GK	(Australia)	Liam Baker	23	0	3	0	26	0
21	MF	(Australia)	Evis Heath	0(1)	0	0(3)	2	4	2
—	FW	(Australia)	Brett Eldridge	0	0	2(1)	1	3	1
—	GK	(Australia)	Brad Swancott	3	0	0	0	3	0

=== Clean sheets ===
Rank	No.	Pos	Nat	Name	National Soccer League	NSL Cup	Total
1	20	GK	(Australia)	Liam Baker	4	0	4
Total					4	0	4
