= 1995–96 Newcastle Breakers FC season =

Newcastle Breakers
1995–96 season
- Stadium: Breakers Stadium; Austral Park
- National Soccer League: 12th
- NSL Cup: Runners-up
- Top goalscorer: League: Jason Bennett (8); All: Jason Bennett (8)
- Highest home attendance: 6,837 vs. UTS Olympic (6 October 1995); National Soccer League
- Lowest home attendance: 1,267 vs. UTS Olympic (23 January 1996); NSL Cup
- Average home league attendance: 3,705
- Biggest win: 3–0 vs. UTS Olympic (8 March 1996); National Soccer League
- Biggest defeat: 0–5 vs. Brisbane Strikers (21 October 1995); National Soccer League

The 1995–96 season was the fourth season in the history of Newcastle Breakers. It was also the fourth season in the National Soccer League. In addition to the domestic league, they also participated in the NSL Cup. Newcastle Breakers finished 12th in their National Soccer League season, and were eliminated in the NSL Cup Final by South Melbourne.

== Players ==
Note: Flags indicate national team as defined under FIFA eligibility rules; some limited exceptions apply. Players may hold more than one non-FIFA nationality.

No.	Pos.	Nation	Player
1	GK	AUS	Craig Carter
2	DF	AUS	Adam Sanderson
3	DF	AUS	Steve Hickman
4	DF	AUS	Ralph Maier
5	DF	AUS	Andy Roberts
6	MF	AUS	Gary Wilson
7	MF	AUS	Craig Sharpley
8	MF	AUS	David Lowe (Captain)
9	MF	AUS	Troy Halpin
10	FW	AUS	Clayton Zane
11	DF	AUS	Damien Brown
12	DF	AUS	Glenn Moore

No.	Pos.	Nation	Player
13	FW	AUS	Harry James
14	FW	AUS	Jason Bennett
15	MF	AUS	Scott Thomas
16	DF	AUS	Shayne Pryce
17	MF	AUS	Glenn Sprod
18	DF	AUS	Darren Stewart
19	DF	AUS	Nick Johns
20	GK	AUS	Adam Fittock
21	MF	AUS	Peter Ritchie
22	DF	AUS	Ryan Smith
23	DF	AUS	Linkon Knott

== Competitions ==
=== Overview ===
Competition	First match	Last match	Starting round	Final position	Record							
Competition	First match	Last match	Starting round	Final position	Pld	W	D	L	GF	GA	GD	Win %
National Soccer League	6 October 1995	28 April 1996	Matchday 1	12th	33	4	5	24	35	77	−42	12.12
NSL Cup	12 January 1996	27 January 1996	First round	Final	5	3	1	1	9	6	+3	60.00
Total					38	7	6	25	44	83	−39	18.42

Last updated: complete
Source: Competitions

=== National Soccer League ===
==== League table ====
Pos	Team	Pld	W	D	L	GF	GA	GD	Pts	Qualification
1	Marconi Fairfield	33	17	9	7	58	35	+23	60	Qualification for the Finals series
2	Melbourne Knights (C)	33	17	8	8	50	28	+22	59	Qualification for the Finals series
3	UTS Olympic	33	17	8	8	55	41	+14	59	Qualification for the Finals series
4	Brisbane Strikers	33	17	6	10	54	35	+19	57	Qualification for the Finals series
5	Adelaide City	33	15	9	9	65	40	+25	54	Qualification for the Finals series
6	Sydney United	33	14	12	7	47	33	+14	54	Qualification for the Finals series
7	West Adelaide	33	16	5	12	49	43	+6	53	
8	South Melbourne	33	14	4	15	50	56	−6	46	
9	Canberra Cosmos	33	8	11	14	48	61	−13	35	
10	Morwell Falcons	33	9	8	16	35	65	−30	35	
11	Wollongong City	33	5	5	23	31	63	−32	20	
12	Newcastle Breakers	33	4	5	24	35	77	−42	17	

Updated to match(es) played on unknown. Source: rsssf.com
Rules for classification: 1) points; 2) goal difference; 3) number of goals scored.
(C) Champions

==== Results summary ====
Overall								Home						Away					
Pld	W	D	L	GF	GA	GD	Pts	W	D	L	GF	GA	GD	W	D	L	GF	GA	GD
33	4	5	24	35	77	−42	17	3	5	8	24	34	−10	1	0	16	11	43	−32

Source: worldfootball.net

==== Results by round ====
Round	1	2	3	4	5	6	7	8	9	10	11	12	13	14	15	16	17	18	19	20	21	22	23	24	25	26	27	28	29	30	31	32	33
Ground	H	A	H	A	A	H	A	H	A	H	A	A	H	A	H	H	A	H	A	H	A	H	H	A	H	A	A	H	A	H	A	H	A
Result	D	L	D	L	W	L	L	W	L	L	L	L	L	L	D	D	L	L	L	D	L	W	W	L	L	L	L	L	L	L	L	L	L
Position	5	9	9	11	9	10	11	9	9	11	12	12	12	12	12	11	11	11	11	11	12	11	11	11	11	11	11	11	12	12	12	12	12

Source: worldfootball.net
A = Away; H = Home; W = Win; D = Draw; L = Loss

==== Matches ====
6 October 1995 1	Newcastle Breakers	2–2	UTS Olympic	Newcastle
	Bennett 16'; Brown 75'	Report	Tsekenis 32'; Taliadoros 51' (pen.)	Stadium: Breakers Stadium; Attendance: 6,837; Referee: Shaun Micallef

14 October 1995 2	Marconi Fairfield	2–0	Newcastle Breakers	Sydney
	Maloney 62'; Awaritefe 86'	Report		Stadium: Marconi Stadium; Attendance: 5,490; Referee: Con Diomis

18 October 1995 3	Newcastle Breakers	1–1	West Adelaide	Newcastle
	Bennett 9'	Report	Tsekinis 2'	Stadium: Breakers Stadium; Attendance: 4,354; Referee: Con Diomis

21 October 1995 4	Brisbane Strikers	5–0	Newcastle Breakers	Brisbane
	S. Cranney 2', 50'; Brown 25'; Farina 33'; Battistin 90'	Report		Stadium: Suncorp Stadium; Attendance: 3,697; Referee: Mark Shield

29 October 1995 5	Sydney United	1–2	Newcastle Breakers	Sydney
	Rudan 39'	Report	Bennett 34'; Lowe 62' (pen.)	Stadium: Sydney United Sports Centre; Attendance: 4,716; Referee: D. Crawford

3 November 1995 6	Newcastle Breakers	1–2	Melbourne Knights	Newcastle
	Zane 36'	Report	Spiteri 59'; Markovski 89'	Stadium: Breakers Stadium; Attendance: 4,994; Referee: Brett Hugo

10 November 1995 7	Morwell Falcons	1–0	Newcastle Breakers	Morwell
	Despotovski 34'	Report		Stadium: Falcons Park; Attendance: 2,500; Referee: Gerry Connolly

17 November 1995 8	Newcastle Breakers	2–1	Adelaide City	Newcastle
	Zane 23'; Lowe 68' (pen.)	Report	Hassell 20'	Stadium: Breakers Stadium; Attendance: 4,189; Referee: S. Micallef

25 November 1995 9	Canberra Cosmos	3–2	Newcastle Breakers	Canberra
	Wade 56', 68' (pen.), 72'	Report	Zane 58'; Sprod 89'	Stadium: Bruce Stadium; Attendance: 2,240; Referee: Con Diomis

1 December 1995 10	Newcastle Breakers	1–2	Wollongong City	Newcastle
	Brown 66'	Report	Perinich 33', 51'	Stadium: Breakers Stadium; Attendance: 2,822; Referee: Mark Shield

6 December 1995 11	South Melbourne	3–1	Newcastle Breakers	Melbourne
	Lewis 54'; Kelic 75'; Panopoulos 88' (pen.)	Report	Bennett 64'	Stadium: Bob Jane Stadium; Attendance: 4,340; Referee: Gerry Connelly

10 December 1995 12	UTS Olympic	4–0	Newcastle Breakers	Sydney
	Hickman 18' (o.g.); Ardone 39'; Trajanovski 52'; Tome 85'	Report		Stadium: Leichhardt Oval; Attendance: 4,375; Referee: D. Crawford

15 December 1995 13	Newcastle Breakers	0–2	Marconi Fairfield	Newcastle
		Report	Longo 56'; Harper 61'	Stadium: Breakers Stadium; Attendance: 3,399; Referee: Cain Naumcevski

23 December 1995 14	West Adelaide	2–1	Newcastle Breakers	Adelaide
	Tsekinis 31'; Cardozo 62'	Report	Aloisi 45' (o.g.)	Stadium: Hindmarsh Stadium; Attendance: 3,307; Referee: J. Papanicolas

26 December 1995 15	Newcastle Breakers	0–0	Brisbane Strikers	Newcastle
		Report		Stadium: Breakers Stadium; Attendance: 3,150; Referee: John Fraser

29 December 1995 16	Newcastle Breakers	1–1	Sydney United	Newcastle
	James 89'	Report	Zdrilic 7'	Stadium: Breakers Stadium; Attendance: 4,038; Referee: D. Crawford

7 January 1996 17	Melbourne Knights	2–0	Newcastle Breakers	Melbourne
	Lapsansky 5'; Marth 74' (pen.)	Report		Stadium: Melbourne Croatian Sports Centre; Attendance: 4,187; Referee: Cain Naumcevski

2 February 1996 18	Newcastle Breakers	1–2	Morwell Falcons	Newcastle
	Stewart 80'	Report	Hickman 20' (o.g.); Villani 35'	Stadium: Breakers Stadium; Attendance: 3,971; Referee: Brett Hugo

16 February 1996 20	Newcastle Breakers	5–5	Canberra Cosmos	Newcastle
	Thomas 10'; Halpin 33', 45', 62'; Koch 49' (o.g.)	Report	Wade 53', 88'; Musitano 69'; Kelly 78'; Dunn 83'	Stadium: Breakers Stadium; Attendance: 2,817; Referee: Mark Shield

23 February 1996 21	Wollongong City	4–1	Newcastle Breakers	Wollongong
	Ceccoli 34'; Perinich 53', 74'; Jermen 70'	Report	Lowe 37' (pen.)	Stadium: Brandon Park; Attendance: 2,984; Referee: Con Diomis

1 March 1996 22	Newcastle Breakers	4–2	South Melbourne	Newcastle
	Lowe 33', 74' (pen.); Halpin 48'; Bennett 89'	Report	Orlic 45'; Baser 88'	Stadium: Breakers Stadium; Attendance: 2,621; Referee: Gerry Connelly

5 March 1996 19	Adelaide City	2–1	Newcastle Breakers	Adelaide
	Mori 9', 38'	Report	Bennett 18'	Stadium: Hindmarsh Stadium; Attendance: 2,015; Referee: Wayne Dade

8 March 1996 23	Newcastle Breakers	3–0	UTS Olympic	Newcastle
	Pryce 64'; Bennett 69'; Zane 89'	Report		Stadium: Breakers Stadium; Attendance: 3,045; Referee: D. Crawford

12 March 1996 24	Marconi Fairfield	3–1	Newcastle Breakers	Sydney
	Sanderson 13' (o.g.); Renaud 23'; Bingley 72'	Report	Halpin 22'	Stadium: Marconi Stadium; Attendance: 3,231; Referee: Con Diomis

15 March 1996 25	Newcastle Breakers	0–4	West Adelaide	Newcastle
		Report	Tsekinis 44', 46'; Aloisi 58'; Cardozo 69'	Stadium: Breakers Stadium; Attendance: 3,245; Referee: Mark Shield

23 March 1996 26	Brisbane Strikers	3–2	Newcastle Breakers	Brisbane
	Hunter 38' (pen.); Farina 63', 89'	Report	Sprod 22'; Zane 83'	Stadium: Suncorp Stadium; Attendance: 3,615; Referee: J. Papanicolas

20 March 1996 27	Sydney United	3–0	Newcastle Breakers	Sydney
	Genc 10'; Lamond 34'; Zdrilic 68'	Report		Stadium: Sydney United Sports Centre; Attendance: 2,918; Referee: Brett Hugo

29 March 1996 28	Newcastle Breakers	1–4	Melbourne Knights	Newcastle
	Bennett 8'	Report	Marth 19'; Kutlesovski 32', 56'; Roberts 78' (o.g.)	Stadium: Breakers Stadium; Attendance: 3,178; Referee: Con Diomis

6 April 1996 29	Morwell Falcons	1–0	Newcastle Breakers	Morwell
	Masi 73'	Report		Stadium: Falcons Park; Attendance: 1,267; Referee: J. Fraser

8 April 1996 30	Newcastle Breakers	2–4	Adelaide City	Newcastle
	Thomas 15'; Sanderson 82'	Report	Lozanovski 55'; Mori 63'; Sanderson 74' (o.g.); Hassell 78'	Stadium: Breakers Stadium; Attendance: 2,766; Referee: D. Crawford

13 April 1996 31	Canberra Cosmos	2–0	Newcastle Breakers	Canberra
	Hickman 44' (o.g.); Lemezina 69'	Report		Stadium: Bruce Stadium; Attendance: 1,521; Referee: J. Fraser

19 April 1996 32	Newcastle Breakers	0–2	Wollongong City	Newcastle
		Report	Jermen 12'; Perinich 53'	Stadium: Breakers Stadium; Attendance: 3,865; Referee: W. Dade

28 April 1996 33	South Melbourne	2–0	Newcastle Breakers	Melbourne
	Damianos 8'; Muscat 71'	Report		Stadium: Bob Jane Stadium; Attendance: 5,253; Referee: Mark Shield

=== NSL Cup ===
12 January 1996 First round 1st Leg	Newcastle Breakers	1–0	Brisbane Strikers	Newcastle
	Sprod 68'	Report		Stadium: Austral Park; Attendance: 1,310; Referee: Con Diomis

20 January 1996 First round 2nd Leg	Brisbane Strikers	1–1	Newcastle Breakers	Brisbane
	Cranney 14'	Report	James 62'	Stadium: Suncorp Stadium; Attendance: 3,149; Referee: D. Crawford

23 January 1996 Quarter-finals	Newcastle Breakers	3–1	UTS Olympic	Newcastle
	Moore 35'; Thomas 39'; Troy Halpin 63'	Report	Taliadoros 4' (pen.)	Stadium: Breakers Stadium; Attendance: 1,267; Referee: Simon Micallef

25 January 1996 Semi-finals	Newcastle Breakers	3–1	Adelaide City	Newcastle
	Hickman 40' (pen.); Thomas 41'; James 73'	Report	Hassell 80'	Stadium: Breakers Stadium; Attendance: 1,625; Referee: Con Diomis

27 January 1996 Final	South Melbourne	3–1	Newcastle Breakers	Melbourne
	Coveny 22', 74'; Panopoulos 35' (pen.)	Report	Hassell 80'	Stadium: Bob Jane Stadium; Attendance: 5,000; Referee: Simon Micallef

== Statistics ==
=== Appearances and goals ===
Players with no appearances not included in the list.

No.	Pos.	Nat.	Name	National Soccer League		NSL Cup		Total	
No.	Pos.	Nat.	Name	Apps	Goals	Apps	Goals	Apps	Goals
1	GK	(Australia)	Craig Carter	25	0	2	0	27	0
2	DF	(Australia)	Adam Sanderson	23(1)	1	0	0	24	1
3	DF	(Australia)	Steve Hickman	26(2)	0	5	2	33	2
4	DF	(Australia)	Ralph Maier	32	0	1(2)	0	35	0
5	DF	(Australia)	Andy Roberts	22(1)	0	0	0	23	0
6	MF	(Australia)	Gary Wilson	9	0	0	0	9	0
7	MF	(Australia)	Craig Sharpley	23(4)	1	0	0	27	1
8	MF	(Australia)	David Lowe	21(5)	5	0	0	26	5
9	MF	(Australia)	Troy Halpin	17(3)	5	5	1	25	6
10	FW	(Australia)	Clayton Zane	23(6)	5	0(2)	0	31	5
11	DF	(Australia)	Damien Brown	12(4)	2	0(1)	0	17	2
12	DF	(Australia)	Glenn Moore	8(2)	0	5	1	15	1
13	FW	(Australia)	Harry James	3(4)	1	5	2	12	3
14	FW	(Australia)	Jason Bennett	26(1)	8	5	0	32	8
15	MF	(Australia)	Scott Thomas	16(6)	2	5	2	27	4
16	DF	(Australia)	Shane Pryce	19(2)	1	5	0	26	1
17	MF	(Australia)	Glenn Sprod	23(3)	2	5	1	31	3
18	DF	(Australia)	Darren Stewart	9	1	5	0	14	1
19	DF	(Australia)	Nick Johns	1(4)	0	0(1)	0	6	0
20	GK	(Australia)	Adam Fittock	8(3)	0	3	0	14	0
21	MF	(Australia)	Peter Ritchie	15	0	4	0	19	0
22	DF	(Australia)	Ryan Smith	2(1)	0	0	0	3	0
23	GK	(Australia)	Linkon Knott	0(2)	0	0	0	2	0

=== Clean sheets ===
Rank	No.	Pos	Nat	Name	National Soccer League	NSL Cup	Total
1	1	GK	(Australia)	Craig Carter	2	0	2
2	20	GK	(Australia)	Adam Fittock	0	1	1
Total					2	1	3
