= 1993–94 Newcastle Breakers FC season =

Newcastle Breakers
1993–94 season
- Chairman: Neil Fletcher
- Manager: Jim Foley
- Stadium: Mitre 10 Stadium
- National Soccer League: 12th
- NSL Cup: First round
- Top goalscorer: League: Warren Spink (13); All: Warren Spink (13)
- Highest home attendance: 4,381 vs. Sydney Olympic (29 October 1993); National Soccer League
- Lowest home attendance: 1,477 vs. Marconi Fairfield (6 October 1993); NSL Cup
- Average home league attendance: 2,810
- Biggest win: 6–0 vs. Heidelberg United (26 December 1993); National Soccer League
- Biggest defeat: 0–4 vs. Parramatta Eagles (5 December 1993); National Soccer League

The 1993–94 season was the third season in the history of Newcastle Breakers. It was also the third season in the National Soccer League. In addition to the domestic league, they also participated in the NSL Cup. Newcastle Breakers finished 12th in their National Soccer League season, and were eliminated in the NSL Cup first round by Marconi Fairfield.

== Players ==
Note: Flags indicate national team as defined under FIFA eligibility rules; some limited exceptions apply. Players may hold more than one non-FIFA nationality.

No.	Pos.	Nation	Player
1	GK	NZL	Clint Gosling
2	DF	AUS	Ralph Maier
3	DF	AUS	Andy Roberts
4	FW	SCO	Lawrie McKinna
5	DF	AUS	Mark Jones
6	DF	AUS	Graham Jennings
7	DF	AUS	Bobby Naumov
8	MF	AUS	John McQuarrie
9	FW	AUS	Rod Brown
10	FW	AUS	Warren Spink
11	MF	AUS	David Lowe
12	DF	AUS	Neil Owens

No.	Pos.	Nation	Player
13	DF	AUS	Darren Stewart
14	FW	AUS	Howard Tredinnick
15	MF	AUS	Troy Halpin
16	MF	AUS	Nick Meredith
17	MF	AUS	Scott Wells
18	MF	AUS	Mark Wilson
19	DF	AUS	Darren Northam
20		AUS	Troy Bellamy
—	FW	AUS	Harry James
—	MF	AUS	Robbie Middleby
—	MF	AUS	Gary Wilson

== Competitions ==
=== Overview ===
Competition	First match	Last match	Starting round	Final position	Record							
Competition	First match	Last match	Starting round	Final position	Pld	W	D	L	GF	GA	GD	Win %
National Soccer League	22 October 1993	27 March 1994	Matchday 1	12th	26	5	8	13	30	47	−17	19.23
NSL Cup	2 October 1993	6 October 1993	First round	First round	2	0	1	1	2	3	−1	0.00
Total					28	5	9	14	32	50	−18	17.86

Last updated: complete
Source: Competitions

=== National Soccer League ===
==== League table ====
Pos	Team	Pld	W	D	L	GF	GA	GD	Pts	Qualification
1	Melbourne Knights	26	16	5	5	59	24	+35	53	Qualification for the Finals series
2	South Melbourne	26	13	8	5	39	20	+19	47	Qualification for the Finals series
3	Sydney United	26	13	7	6	31	29	+2	46	Qualification for the Finals series
4	Marconi Fairfield	26	11	9	6	52	33	+19	42	Qualification for the Finals series
5	Adelaide City (C)	26	11	8	7	48	27	+21	41	Qualification for the Finals series
6	Sydney Olympic	26	11	8	7	40	37	+3	41	Qualification for the Finals series
7	Morwell Falcons	26	11	7	8	31	30	+1	40	
8	Brisbane Strikers	26	10	6	10	28	25	+3	36	
9	West Adelaide	26	10	5	11	41	34	+7	35	
10	Parramatta Eagles	26	8	9	9	27	29	−2	33	
11	Wollongong City	26	6	9	11	24	32	−8	27	
12	Newcastle Breakers	26	5	8	13	30	47	−17	23	
13	Brunswick Pumas	26	5	4	17	22	57	−35	19	
14	Heidelberg United	26	3	5	18	19	67	−48	14	

Updated to match(es) played on unknown. Source: rsssf.com
Rules for classification: 1) points; 2) goal difference; 3) number of goals scored.
(C) Champions

==== Results summary ====
Overall								Home						Away					
Pld	W	D	L	GF	GA	GD	Pts	W	D	L	GF	GA	GD	W	D	L	GF	GA	GD
26	5	8	13	30	47	−17	23	3	6	4	21	21	0	2	2	9	9	26	−17

Source: worldfootball.net

==== Results by round ====
Round	1	2	3	4	5	6	7	8	9	10	11	12	13	14	15	16	17	18	19	20	21	22	23	24	25	26
Ground	A	H	A	H	A	H	H	A	H	A	H	A	H	A	H	H	A	H	A	A	H	A	H	A	H	A
Result	L	W	D	L	W	W	D	L	L	L	W	L	D	L	D	L	L	D	L	W	D	L	D	D	L	L
Position	12	7	10	10	8	5	8	8	10	11	9	11	11	11	11	11	11	11	11	11	12	12	12	12	12	12

Source: worldfootball.net
A = Away; H = Home; W = Win; D = Draw; L = Loss

==== Matches ====
22 October 1993 1	Wollongong City	3–1	Newcastle Breakers	Wollongong
	McFadden (?); White (?); Ollerenshaw (?)	Report	Spink (?)	Stadium: Brandon Park; Attendance: 2,868

29 October 1993 2	Newcastle Breakers	3–2	Sydney Olympic	Newcastle
	Lowe (?); Spink (?)	Report		Stadium: Breakers Stadium; Attendance: 4,381

7 November 1993 3	West Adelaide	0–0	Newcastle Breakers	Adelaide
		Report		Stadium: Hindmarsh Stadium; Attendance: 2,812

14 November 1993 5	Brunswick Pumas	0–2	Newcastle Breakers	Melbourne
		Report	Spink (?); Brown (?)	Stadium: Western Oval; Attendance: 1,928

20 November 1993 6	Newcastle Breakers	3–1	Sydney United	Newcastle
	Spink (?); Brown (?)	Report	Lamond (?)	Stadium: Breakers Stadium; Attendance: 2,338

27 November 1993 7	Newcastle Breakers	0–0	Morwell Falcons	Newcastle
		Report		Stadium: Breakers Stadium; Attendance: 3,724

5 December 1993 8	Parramatta Eagles	4–0	Newcastle Breakers	Sydney
	Soper (?); Spiteri (?)	Report		Stadium: Melita Stadium; Attendance: 3,116

10 December 1993 9	Newcastle Breakers	1–3	Adelaide City	Newcastle
	Spink (?)	Report	Vidmar (?); Mullen (?); Veart (?)	Stadium: Breakers Stadium; Attendance: 3,170

15 December 1993 4	Newcastle Breakers	1–4	South Melbourne	Newcastle
	Naumov (?)	Report	Muscat (?); Tasios (?); Boutsianis (?); Awaritefe (?)	Stadium: Breakers Stadium; Attendance: 2,984

18 December 1993 10	Marconi Fairfield	3–1	Newcastle Breakers	Sydney
	Johnson (?)	Report	Brown (?)	Stadium: Marconi Stadium; Attendance: 2,980

26 December 1993 11	Newcastle Breakers	6–0	Heidelberg United	Newcastle
	Jennings (?); McQuarrie (?); Spink (?); Brown (?)	Report		Stadium: Breakers Stadium; Attendance: 2,688

29 December 1993 12	Melbourne Knights	4–1	Newcastle Breakers	Melbourne
	Marth (?); Trajcevski (?); Vojtek (?); Viduka (?)	Report	Tredinnick (?)	Stadium: Somers St Stadium; Attendance: 1,987

3 January 1994 13	Newcastle Breakers	0–0	Brisbane Strikers	Newcastle
		Report		Stadium: Breakers Stadium; Attendance: 3,121

11 January 1994 14	Sydney Olympic	2–1	Newcastle Breakers	Sydney
	Maloney (?); Kelic (?)	Report	Meredith (?)	Stadium: Leichhardt Oval; Attendance: 4,201

14 January 1994 15	Newcastle Breakers	2–2	Wollongong City	Newcastle
	Spink (?); Brown (?)	Report	Ollerenshaw (?); Horsley (?)	Stadium: Breakers Stadium; Attendance: 2,133

21 January 1994 16	Newcastle Breakers	1–4	West Adelaide	Newcastle
	Spink (?)	Report	Cardozo (?); Blair (?); Brazzale (?)	Stadium: Breakers Stadium; Attendance: 2,371

26 January 1994 17	South Melbourne	4–1	Newcastle Breakers	Melbourne
	Muscat (?); Durakovic (?); Goutzioulis (?); Tsolakis (?)	Report	Spink (?)	Stadium: Middle Park; Attendance: 2,453

28 January 1994 18	Newcastle Breakers	1–1	Brunswick Pumas	Newcastle
	Spink (?)	Report	Zinni (?)	Stadium: Breakers Stadium; Attendance: 2,227

6 February 1994 19	Sydney United	1–0	Newcastle Breakers	Sydney
	Gibson (?)	Report		Stadium: Edensor Park; Attendance: 3,239

12 February 1994 20	Morwell Falcons	0–1	Newcastle Breakers	Morwell
		Report	Brown (?)	Stadium: Falcons Park; Attendance: 3,123

18 February 1994 21	Newcastle Breakers	1–1	Parramatta Eagles	Newcastle
	Maier (?)	Report	Naumovski (?)	Stadium: Breakers Stadium; Attendance: 2,724

27 February 1994 22	Adelaide City	3–0	Newcastle Breakers	Adelaide
	Veart (?); Mori (?)	Report		Stadium: Hindmarsh Stadium; Attendance: 4,259

4 March 1994 23	Newcastle Breakers	2–2	Marconi Fairfield	Newcastle
	Naumov (?); Spink (?)	Report	Taliadoros (?); Harper (?)	Stadium: Breakers Stadium; Attendance: 2,413

13 March 1994 24	Heidelberg United	1–1	Newcastle Breakers	Melbourne
	MacNicol (?)	Report	Roberts (?)	Stadium: Olympic Village; Attendance: 1,170

18 March 1994 25	Newcastle Breakers	0–1	Melbourne Knights	Newcastle
		Report	Cervinski (?)	Stadium: Breakers Stadium; Attendance: 2,256

27 March 1994 26	Brisbane Strikers	1–0	Newcastle Breakers	Brisbane
	Wright (?)	Report		Stadium: Perry Park; Attendance: 1,615

=== NSL Cup ===
2 October 1993 First round 1st Leg	Marconi Fairfield	1–1	Newcastle Breakers	Sydney
	Casserly 70'	Report	Lowe 59'	Stadium: Marconi Stadium; Attendance: 685

6 October 1993 First round 2nd Leg	Newcastle Breakers	1–2	Marconi Fairfield	Newcastle
	Jennings 14'	Report	Bingley 61'; Angelucci 71'	Stadium: Breakers Stadium; Attendance: 1,477

== Statistics ==
=== Appearances and goals ===
Players with no appearances not included in the list.

No.	Pos.	Nat.	Name	National Soccer League		NSL Cup		Total	
No.	Pos.	Nat.	Name	Apps	Goals	Apps	Goals	Apps	Goals
1	GK	(New Zealand)	Clint Gosling	26	0	2	0	28	0
2	DF	(Australia)	Ralph Maier	26	1	2	0	28	1
3	DF	(Australia)	Andy Roberts	16(2)	1	2	0	20	1
4	FW	(Scotland)	Lawrie McKinna	1(7)	0	0	0	8	0
5	DF	(Australia)	Mark Jones	23(1)	0	0	0	24	0
6	DF	(Australia)	Graham Jennings	25	1	2	1	27	2
7	DF	(Australia)	Bobby Naumov	16(7)	2	2	0	25	2
8	MF	(Australia)	John McQuarrie	16(2)	1	1	0	19	1
9	FW	(Australia)	Rod Brown	25	8	1	0	26	8
10	FW	(Australia)	Warren Spink	22	13	2	0	24	13
11	MF	(Australia)	David Lowe	22(1)	1	2	1	25	2
12	DF	(Australia)	Neil Owens	19(4)	0	2	0	25	0
13	DF	(Australia)	Darren Stewart	11	0	0	0	11	0
14	FW	(Australia)	Howard Tredinnick	17	1	0	0	17	1
15	MF	(Australia)	Troy Halpin	3(8)	0	0	0	11	0
16	MF	(Australia)	Nick Meredith	11(1)	1	2	0	14	1
17	MF	(Australia)	Scott Wells	1(2)	0	2	0	5	0
18	MF	(Australia)	Mark Wilson	0(3)	0	0	0	3	0
—	FW	(Australia)	Harry James	1	0	0	0	1	0
—	MF	(Australia)	Robbie Middleby	1(3)	0	0(1)	0	5	0
—	MF	(Australia)	Gary Wilson	4(1)	0	0(2)	0	7	0

=== Clean sheets ===
Rank	No.	Pos	Nat	Name	National Soccer League	NSL Cup	Total
1	1	GK	(Australia)	Clint Gosling	6	0	6
Total					6	0	6
