= 1992–93 NSL Cup =

National Soccer League Cup

Tournament details
- Country: Australia
- Dates: 11 November 1992 – 18 April 1993
- Teams: 14

Final positions
- Champions: Heidelberg United (1st title)
- Runners-up: Parramatta Eagles

Tournament statistics
- Matches played: 23
- Goals scored: 85 (3.7 per match)
- Attendance: 24,382 (1,060 per match)
- Top goal scorer: Carl Veart (5)

The 1992–93 NSL Cup was the 17th season of the National Soccer League Cup. Adelaide City were the holders, having beaten Marconi Fairfield in the 1992 NSL Cup Final. They were eliminated by Heidelberg United in the semi-finals. Heidelberg United beat Parramatta Eagles in the Final to win their 1st NSL Cup overall.

== Teams ==
The NSL Cup was a knockout competition with 14 teams taking part all trying to reach the Final in April 1993. The competitors consist of the 14 teams from the National Soccer League.

| Round | Main date | Number of fixtures | Clubs remaining |
|---|---|---|---|
| First round | Wednesday 2 December 1992 | 12 | 14 → 8 |
| Second round | Wednesday 13 January 1993 | 8 | 8 → 4 |
| Semi-finals | Wednesday 3 March 1993 | 2 | 4 → 2 |
| Final | Sunday 18 April 1993 | 1 | 2 → 1 |

== First round ==
| 11 November 1992 | Marconi Fairfield | 3–1 | Wollongong City | Sydney |
| | Harper 17'; Taliadoros 71'; Johnson 78' | Report | O'Shea 3' | Stadium: Marconi Stadium; Attendance: 605; Referee: Gordon Dunster |

| 16 December 1992 | Wollongong City | 0–3 | Marconi Fairfield | Wollongong |
| | | Report | Harper 28'; Mancino 58'; Corica 65' | Stadium: Brandon Park; Referee: Gordon Dunster |

Marconi Fairfield won 6–1 on aggregate

| 11 November 1992 | Newcastle Breakers | 2–2 | Parramatta Eagles | Newcastle |
| | Brown 43'; Stewart 52' | Report | Gomez 81'; Mendez 90+1' | Stadium: Breakers Stadium; Attendance: 1,333; Referee: Peter Spiers |

| 9 December 1992 | Parramatta Eagles | 2–1 | Newcastle Breakers | Sydney |
| | Genc 44'; Mendez ?' | Report | Naumov ?' | Stadium: Melita Stadium; Referee: Richard Lorenc |

Parramatta Eagles won 4–3 on aggregate

| 18 November 1992 | Adelaide City | 3–2 | West Adelaide | Adelaide |
| | Veart ?'; Mori ?'; Maxwell ?' | Report | Brown ?'; Brazzale ?' (pen.) | Stadium: Hindmarsh Stadium |

| 9 December 1992 | West Adelaide | 1–2 | Adelaide City | Adelaide |
| | Iriarte ?' | Report | Veart ?', ?' | Stadium: Hindmarsh Stadium; Attendance: 7,000; Referee: Ziggy Mnich |

Adelaide City won 5–3 on aggregate

| 18 November 1992 | Melbourne CSC | 2–2 | Preston Makedonia | Melbourne |
| | Coveny 18'; Silic 90' | Report | Trpcevski 11', 56' | Stadium: Somers Street Stadium |

| 2 December 1992 | Preston Makedonia | 2–0 | Melbourne CSC | Melbourne |
| | Najdovski 17', 71' | Report | | Stadium: B.T. Connor Reserve |

Preston Makedonia won 4–2 on aggregate

| 18 November 1992 | South Melbourne | 6–2 | Morwell Falcons | Melbourne |
| | Awaritefe ?', ?'; Tasios ?', ?'; Wade ?'; Wright ?' | Report | Becvinovski 50'; Geri 73' | Stadium: Middle Park |

| 2 December 1992 | Morwell Falcons | 1–4 | South Melbourne | Morwell |
| | Stergiopoulos 4' | Report | Wright 52'; Boutsianis 66' (pen.); Awaritefe 71'; Tsolakis 86' | Stadium: Falcons Park |

South Melbourne won 10–3 on aggregate

| 25 November 1992 | Sydney Olympic | 1–3 | Brisbane United | Sydney |
| | Bernal 87' | Report | Cooper 12', 37', 77' | Stadium: St George Stadium |

| 2 December 1992 | Brisbane United | 1–1 | Sydney Olympic | Brisbane |
| | Stipancic ?' | Report | Cardozo ?' | Stadium: Perry Park |

Brisbane United won 4–2 on aggregate

== Second round ==
| 13 January 1993 | Brisbane United | 1–1 | Parramatta Eagles | Brisbane |
| | Koch ?' | Report | Gomez ?' | Stadium: Perry Park; Attendance: 575; Referee: Gary Power |

| 10 February 1993 | Parramatta Eagles | 3–2 | Brisbane United | Sydney |
| | Soper 15', 89'; Foster 68' | Report | Gwynne 24'; Cranney 77' | Stadium: Melita Stadium; Attendance: 473; Referee: Peter Spiers |

Parramatta Eagles won 4–3 on aggregate

| 13 January 1993 | Heidelberg United | 4–1 | South Melbourne | Melbourne |
| | Hunter ?', ?', ?'; Hodgson ?' | Report | Wright ?' | Stadium: Olympic Village; Attendance: 1,527 |

| 21 March 1993 | South Melbourne | 3–3 | Heidelberg United | Melbourne |
| | Awaritefe 25'; Trimboli 33'; Durakovic 90' | Report | Slifkas 45' (pen.); Michalakopoulos 51'; MacNicol 81' | Stadium: Middle Park; Attendance: 3,500; Referee: John Fraser |

Heidelberg United won 7–4 on aggregate

| 13 January 1993 | Preston Makedonia | 1–1 | Adelaide City | Melbourne |
| | Najdovski ?' | Report | Mullen 58' | Stadium: B.T. Connor Reserve; Attendance: 957 |

| 21 March 1993 | Adelaide City | 2–1 | Preston Makedonia | Adelaide |
| | Talladira 25'; Mori 64' | Report | Trajcevski 72' | Stadium: Norwood Oval; Attendance: 965; Referee: Tom McRoe |

Adelaide City won 3–2 on aggregate

| 13 January 1993 | Sydney CSC | 0–2 | Marconi Fairfield | Sydney |
| | | Report | Iocca 18', 43' | Stadium: Edensor Park; Attendance: 1,151; Referee: Rob Davies |

| 10 February 1993 | Marconi Fairfield | 2–4 | Sydney CSC | Sydney |
| | Pelucchi 28'; Harper 35' | Report | Hristodoulou 37' (pen.); Popovic 47'; Gibson 49', 59' | Stadium: Marconi Stadium; Attendance: 888; Referee: Richard Lorenc |

Sydney CSC won 4–2 on away goals rule

== Semi-finals ==
| 3 March 1993 | Parramatta Eagles | 2–1 | Sydney CSC | Sydney |
| | G. Gunning 47', 77' | Report | Jermen 6' | Stadium: Marconi Stadium; Attendance: 1,381; Referee: Gary Brownlie |

| 31 March 1993 | Heidelberg United | 1–0 | Adelaide City | Melbourne |
| | Stubbins 71' | Report | | Stadium: Olympic Park; Attendance: 1,431; Referee: Peter Spiers |

== Final ==
18 April 1993

| Heidelberg United | 2–1 | Parramatta Eagles |
|---|---|---|
| Scott 3'; Souris 87' (o.g.) | Report | Reda 80' |

Marconi Stadium, Sydney
Attendance: 2,596
Referee: Rob Davies

== Top scorers ==
| Rank | Player | Club | Goals |
|---|---|---|---|
| 1 | (Australia) Carl Veart | Adelaide City | 5 |
| 2 | (Australia) Francis Awaritefe | South Melbourne | 4 |
| 3 | (Republic of Ireland) Kieran Cooper | Brisbane United | 3 |
| 3 | (Australia) Derek Hunter | Heidelberg United | 3 |
| 3 | (North Macedonia) Spase Najdovski | Preston Makedonia | 3 |
| 3 | (Australia) Danny Wright | South Melbourne | 3 |
