= List of Newcastle Breakers FC records and statistics =

Newcastle Breakers Football Club was an Australian semi-professional association football club based in Newcastle. The club was formed in 1991 was admitted into the National Soccer League in the 1991–92 season. The club had never qualified for the Finals series in the National Soccer League in all eight seasons of existence until they became defunct in 2000.

The list encompasses the records set by the club, their managers and their players. The player records section itemises the club's leading goalscorers and those who have made most appearances in first-team competitions. Attendance records in Newcastle are also included.

The club's record appearance maker is Andy Roberts, who made 169 appearances between 1978 and 1984. Warren Spink was Newcastle Breakers' record goalscorer, scoring 28 goals in total.

== Player records ==
=== Appearances ===
- Most league appearances: Andy Roberts, 164
- Most NSL Cup appearances: Glenn Sprod, 10

==== Most appearances ====
Competitive matches only, includes appearances as substitute. Numbers in brackets indicate goals scored.

Rank	Player	Years	National Soccer League	NSL Cup	Total
1	(Australia) Andy Roberts	1991–1997; 1998–2000	164 (3)	5 (0)	169 (3)
2	(Australia) Glenn Sprod	1992–1993; 1995–2000	150 (7)	10 (2)	160 (9)
3	(Australia) Shane Pryce	1995–2000	129 (17)	6 (1)	135 (18)
4	(Australia) Ralph Maier	1991–1996	106 (3)	8 (0)	114 (3)
4	(Australia) Todd McManus	1996–2000	109 (3)	3 (0)	114 (3)
6	(Australia) Mark Wilson	1993–1994; 1996–2000	100 (10)	3 (0)	103 (10)
7	(Australia) Troy Halpin	1992–1994; 1995–1998	72 (10)	8 (2)	80 (12)
7	(Australia) Peter Ritchie	1996–1999	76 (2)	4 (0)	80 (2)
9	(Australia) Bobby Naumov	1996–1999	70 (2)	5 (1)	75 (3)
10	(Australia) Clayton Zane	1996–1999	70 (17)	2 (0)	72 (17)

=== Goalscorers ===
- Most goals in a season: John Buonavoglia, 16 goals (in the 1999–2000 season)

==== Top goalscorers ====
Warren Spink was the all-time top goalscorer for Newcastle Breakers.

Competitive matches only. Numbers in brackets indicate appearances made.

Rank	Player	Years	National Soccer League	NSL Cup	Total
1	(Australia) Warren Spink	1992–1994	28 (45)	0 (4)	28 (49)
2	(Australia) John Buonavoglia	1998–2000	22 (62)	0 (0)	22 (62)
3	(Australia) Shane Pryce	1995–2000	17 (129)	1 (6)	18 (135)
4	(Australia) Jason Bennett	1995–2000	15 (64)	2 (6)	17 (70)
4	(Australia) Clayton Zane	1995–2000	17 (70)	0 (2)	17 (72)
6	(Australia) Rod Brown	1992–2004	12 (45)	1 (2)	13 (47)
7	(Australia) Troy Halpin	1992–1994; 1995–1998	10 (72)	2 (8)	12 (80)
8	(Australia) David Lowe	1993–1997	8 (59)	2 (5)	10 (64)
8	(Australia) Mark Wilson	1993–1994; 1996–2000	10 (100)	0 (3)	10 (103)
10	(New Zealand) Robert Ironside	1996–1998	6 (43)	3 (3)	9 (46)
10	(Australia) Glenn Sprod	1993–1994; 1996–2000	7 (150)	2 (10)	9 (160)

== Club records ==
=== Matches ===
==== Firsts ====
- First National Soccer League match: Newcastle Breakers 0–2 Adelaide City, National Soccer League, 6 October 1991
- First NSL Cup match: Newcastle Breakers 0–3 Marconi Fairfield, First round, 20 November 1991

==== Record wins ====
- Record NSL win: 6–0 against Heidelberg United, National Soccer League, 26 December 1993
- Record NSL Cup win: 7–1 against Northern NSW Lions, First round, 12 September 1996

==== Record defeats ====
- Record NSL defeat: 0–6 against Melbourne Croatia, National Soccer League, 8 December 1991
- Record NSL Cup defeat: 0–3 against Marconi Fairfield, First round, 20 November 1991

==== Record consecutive results ====
- Record consecutive wins: 4
  - from 26 November 1999 to 17 December 1999
  - from 6 February 2000 to 25 February 2000
- Record consecutive defeats: 10, from 12 March 1996 to 28 April 1996
- Record consecutive draws: 4, from 26 December 1991 to 12 January 1992
- Record consecutive matches without a defeat: 10, from 19 November 1999 to 21 January 2000
- Record consecutive matches without a win: 17, from 12 October 1997 to 30 January 1998

=== Goals ===
- Most NSL goals scored in a season: 44 in 34 matches, National Soccer League, 1999–2000
- Fewest NSL goals scored in a season: 28 in 26 matches, National Soccer League, 1991–92
- Most NSL goals conceded in a season: 77 in 33 matches, National Soccer League, 1995–96
- Fewest NSL goals conceded in a season: 29 in 26 matches, National Soccer League, 1992–93

=== Points ===
- Most points in a season: 51 in 34 matches, National Soccer League, 1999–2000
- Fewest points in a season: 22 in 26 matches, National Soccer League, 1991–92

=== Attendances ===
- Highest attendance at Newcastle: 7,674, against Adelaide Force, National Soccer League, 21 January 2000
- Lowest attendance at Newcastle: 1,024, against Marconi Fairfield, National Soccer League, 20 November 1991
