= 1998–99 Newcastle Breakers FC season =

Newcastle Breakers
1998–99 season
- Manager: Lee Sterrey
- Stadium: Breakers Stadium
- National Soccer League: 8th
- Top goalscorer: John Buonavoglia (6)
- Highest home attendance: 5,015 vs. Northern Spirit (16 April 1999); National Soccer League
- Lowest home attendance: 3,017 vs. Wollongong Wolves (7 April 1999); National Soccer League
- Average home league attendance: 3,874
- Biggest win: 3–1 vs. Wollongong Wolves (7 April 1999); National Soccer League
- Biggest defeat: 0–3 vs. Carlton (13 December 1998); National Soccer League; 0–3 vs. Canberra Cosmos (26 January 1999); National Soccer League

The 1998–99 season was the seventh season in the history of Newcastle Breakers. It was also the seventh season in the National Soccer League.

== Players ==
Note: Flags indicate national team as defined under FIFA eligibility rules; some limited exceptions apply. Players may hold more than one non-FIFA nationality.

No.	Pos.	Nation	Player
1	GK	ENG	Bob Catlin
2	DF	AUS	Shane Pryce (Captain)
3	DF	AUS	Andy Roberts
4	DF	AUS	Adam Sanderson
5	DF	AUS	Todd McManus
6	MF	AUS	Glenn Sprod
7	MF	AUS	Peter Ritchie
8	MF	AUS	Mark Wilson
9	FW	AUS	Chris Tanchevski
10	FW	AUS	John Buonavoglia
11	FW	AUS	Andrew Borghetto

No.	Pos.	Nation	Player
12	MF	MAR	Fouad Umlil
13	FW	AUS	Brad Wieczorek
14	MF	AUS	Greg Owens
15	FW	AUS	Tony Bauer
16	MF	AUS	Joshua Stick
17	DF	SCO	Robert Shannon
18	DF	AUS	Tom Haythornthwaite
19	DF	KOR	Yoon Sang-chul
20	GK	AUS	Brad Swancott
21	MF	AUS	Joshua Maguire
22	DF	AUS	Joshua Ferguson

== Competitions ==
=== Overview ===
Competition	First match	Last match	Starting round	Final position	Record							
Competition	First match	Last match	Starting round	Final position	Pld	W	D	L	GF	GA	GD	Win %
National Soccer League	11 October 1998	25 April 1999	Matchday 1	8th	28	11	7	10	29	33	−4	39.29
Total					28	11	7	10	29	33	−4	39.29

Last updated: complete
Source: Competitions

=== National Soccer League ===
==== League table ====
Pos	Team	Pld	W	D	L	GF	GA	GD	Pts	Qualification
1	Sydney United	28	18	4	6	53	33	+20	58	Qualification for the Finals series
2	South Melbourne (C)	28	17	6	5	50	26	+24	57	Qualification for the Finals series and the Oceania Club Championship
3	Perth Glory	28	16	5	7	62	37	+25	53	Qualification for the Finals series
4	Marconi Fairfield	28	15	3	10	53	47	+6	48	Qualification for the Finals series
5	Northern Spirit	28	14	4	10	36	35	+1	46	Qualification for the Finals series
6	Adelaide City	28	13	6	9	39	26	+13	45	Qualification for the Finals series
7	Sydney Olympic	28	12	7	9	46	36	+10	43	
8	Newcastle Breakers	28	11	7	10	29	33	−4	40	
9	Brisbane Strikers	28	11	6	11	41	47	−6	39	
10	Wollongong Wolves	28	8	8	12	45	52	−7	32	
11	Carlton	28	9	4	15	47	47	0	31	
12	Melbourne Knights	28	8	5	15	32	43	−11	29	
13	West Adelaide	28	7	6	15	36	46	−10	27	
14	Gippsland Falcons	28	5	10	13	17	44	−27	25	
15	Canberra Cosmos	28	4	3	21	21	55	−34	15	

Source: rsssf.com
Rules for classification: 1) points; 2) goal difference; 3) number of goals scored.
(C) Champions

==== Results summary ====
Overall								Home						Away					
Pld	W	D	L	GF	GA	GD	Pts	W	D	L	GF	GA	GD	W	D	L	GF	GA	GD
28	11	7	10	29	33	−4	40	6	5	3	19	15	+4	5	2	7	10	18	−8

Source: worldfootball.net

==== Results by round ====
Round	1	2	3	4	5	6	7	8	9	10	11	12	13	14	15	16	17	18	19	20	21	22	23	24	25	26	27	28	29	30
Ground	A	H	A	H	A	B	H	A	H	A	H	A	H	A	H	H	A	A	H	H	A	H	B	A	H	A	H	A	H	A
Result	D	W	L	L	L	✖	L	L	W	L	D	W	W	D	W	L	L	W	D	D	W	D	✖	W	W	L	W	L	D	W
Position	7	5	9	12	12	13	14	14	14	14	14	12	11	11	10	11	11	10	10	10	10	10	10	10	8	9	8	8	9	8

Source: worldfootball.net
A = Away; H = Home; B = Bye; W = Win; D = Draw; L = Loss

==== Matches ====
11 October 1998 1	Sydney United	1–1	Newcastle Breakers	Sydney
	Sterjovski 34'	Report	Buonavoglia 56'	Stadium: Edensor Park; Attendance: 6,221; Referee: Matthew Breeze

16 October 1998 2	Newcastle Breakers	2–1	Canberra Cosmos	Newcastle
	Wieczorek 3'; Yoon 75'	Report	Buljan 82' (pen.)	Stadium: Breakers Stadium; Attendance: 4,483; Referee: Con Diomis

25 October 1998 3	South Melbourne	2–0	Newcastle Breakers	Melbourne
	Coveny 24', 59'	Report		Stadium: Bob Jane Stadium; Attendance: 8,115; Referee: Jeremy Blaney

30 October 1998 4	Newcastle Breakers	1–2	Gippsland Falcons	Newcastle
	Buonavoglia 77'	Report	Thompson 54'; Hastie 61'	Stadium: Breakers Stadium; Attendance: 3,496; Referee: Brad McKay

8 November 1998 5	Adelaide Sharks	3–1	Newcastle Breakers	Adelaide
	Poimer 42'; Vidakovic 60'; Gibson 71'	Report	Umlil 45'	Stadium: Hindmarsh Stadium; Attendance: 2,583; Referee: Eugene Brazzale

22 November 1998 7	Newcastle Breakers	1–2	Marconi Fairfield	Newcastle
	Wilson 3'	Report	S. Babic 11'; Roberts 77' (o.g.)	Stadium: Breakers Stadium; Attendance: 3,323; Referee: Matthew Breeze

29 November 1998 8	UTS Olympic	2–1	Newcastle Breakers	Sydney
	Cardozo 32', 44'	Report	Umlil 84'	Stadium: Belmore Sports Ground; Attendance: 5,015; Referee: Jeff Tippett

4 December 1998 9	Newcastle Breakers	3–2	Perth Glory	Newcastle
	Shannon 54'; Owens 73', 87'	Report	Despotovski 9'; Markovski 74'	Stadium: Breakers Stadium; Attendance: 3,687; Referee: Greg Leverton

13 December 1998 10	Carlton	3–0	Newcastle Breakers	Melbourne
	Moreira 43', 64'; Bresciano 53'	Report		Stadium: Optus Oval; Attendance: 3,882; Referee: Wayne Dade

18 December 1998 11	Newcastle Breakers	2–2	Melbourne Knights	Newcastle
	Pryce 43' (pen.), 81' (pen.)	Report	Kelic 7'; Karl 32'	Stadium: Breakers Stadium; Attendance: 3,312; Referee: Matthew Breeze

27 December 1998 12	Wollongong Wolves	1–2	Newcastle Breakers	Wollongong
	Younis 30'	Report	Yoon 5', 13' (pen.)	Stadium: Brandon Park; Attendance: 3,389; Referee: Greg Leverton

3 January 1999 13	Newcastle Breakers	1–0	Adelaide City	Newcastle
	Yoon 4'	Report		Stadium: Breakers Stadium; Attendance: 4,411; Referee: Brad McKay

8 January 1999 14	Northern Spirit	0–0	Newcastle Breakers	Sydney
		Report		Stadium: North Sydney Oval; Attendance: 13,206; Referee: Jeff Tippett

15 January 1999 15	Newcastle Breakers	1–0	Brisbane Strikers	Newcastle
	Buonavoglia 74'	Report		Stadium: Breakers Stadium; Attendance: 4,563; Referee: Greg Leverton

22 January 1999 16	Newcastle Breakers	0–1	Sydney United	Newcastle
		Report	Barrett 75'	Stadium: Breakers Stadium; Attendance: 3,687; Referee: David Dwight

26 January 1999 17	Canberra Cosmos	3–0	Newcastle Breakers	Canberra
	Buljan 12'; Langone 18'; Marcina 87'	Report		Stadium: Bruce Stadium; Attendance: 1,726; Referee: Barry Panella

31 January 1999 18	Perth Glory	0–1	Newcastle Breakers	Perth
		Report	Buonavoglia 15'	Stadium: Perth Oval; Attendance: 10,464; Referee: Perry Mur

5 February 1999 19	Newcastle Breakers	1–1	Sydney Olympic	Newcastle
	Owens 61'	Report	Juric 82'	Stadium: Breakers Stadium; Attendance: 4,055; Referee: Jeremy Blaney

12 February 1999 20	Newcastle Breakers	0–0	South Melbourne	Newcastle
		Report		Stadium: Breakers Stadium; Attendance: 3,789; Referee: Jeff Tippett

21 February 1999 21	Gippsland Falcons	0–1	Newcastle Breakers	Morwell
		Report	Wilson 81'	Stadium: Mobil Park; Attendance: 1,735; Referee: Con Diomis

26 February 1999 22	Newcastle Breakers	2–2	West Adelaide	Newcastle
	Buonavoglia 39'; Haythornthwaite 88'	Report	Artone 59'; Castro 74'	Stadium: Breakers Stadium; Attendance: 3,204; Referee: Eugene Brazzale

13 March 1999 24	Marconi Fairfield	0–1	Newcastle Breakers	Sydney
		Report	Haythornthwaite 10'	Stadium: Marconi Stadium; Attendance: 4,211; Referee: Mark Shield

19 March 1999 25	Newcastle Breakers	1–0	Carlton	Newcastle
	Pryce 70' (pen.)	Report		Stadium: Breakers Stadium; Attendance: 4,196; Referee: Brett Hugo

28 March 1999 26	Melbourne Knights	1–0	Newcastle Breakers	Melbourne
	Susa 24'	Report		Stadium: Knights Stadium; Attendance: 2,091; Referee: Gerry Connolly

7 April 1999 27	Newcastle Breakers	3–1	Wollongong Wolves	Newcastle
	Haythornthwaite 28'; Wilson 66'; Buonavoglia 82'	Report	Surjan 60'	Stadium: Breakers Stadium; Attendance: 3,017; Referee: Brett Hugo

11 April 1999 28	Adelaide City	1–0	Newcastle Breakers	Adelaide
	Mori 31'	Report		Stadium: Hindmarsh Stadium; Attendance: 3,639; Referee: Con Diomis

16 April 1999 29	Newcastle Breakers	1–1	Northern Spirit	Newcastle
	Haythornthwaite 67'	Report	Bilokapic 59' (pen.)	Stadium: Breakers Stadium; Attendance: 5,015; Referee: Matthew Breeze

25 April 1999 30	Brisbane Strikers	1–2	Newcastle Breakers	Brisbane
	Harper 40'	Report	Pryce 77' (pen.); Ritchie 78'	Stadium: Suncorp Stadium; Attendance: 3,463; Referee: Jeff Tippett

== Statistics ==
=== Appearances and goals ===
Players with no appearances not included in the list.

No.	Pos.	Nat.	Name	National Soccer League		Total	
No.	Pos.	Nat.	Name	Apps	Goals	Apps	Goals
1	GK	(England)	Bob Catlin	27	0	27	0
2	DF	(Australia)	Shane Pryce	27	4	27	4
3	DF	(Australia)	Andy Roberts	24(4)	0	28	0
4	DF	(Australia)	Adam Sanderson	12(9)	0	21	0
5	DF	(Australia)	Todd McManus	27	0	27	0
6	MF	(Australia)	Glenn Sprod	18(2)	0	20	0
7	MF	(Australia)	Peter Ritchie	17(5)	1	22	1
8	MF	(Australia)	Mark Wilson	23(4)	3	27	3
9	FW	(Australia)	Chris Tanchevski	0(9)	0	9	0
10	FW	(Australia)	John Buonavoglia	28	6	28	6
11	FW	(Australia)	Andrew Borghetto	1	0	1	0
12	MF	(Morocco)	Fouad Umlil	15(12)	2	27	2
13	FW	(Australia)	Brad Wieczorek	19(2)	1	21	1
14	MF	(Australia)	Greg Owens	8(12)	3	20	3
15	FW	(Australia)	Tony Bauer	0(2)	0	2	0
17	DF	(Scotland)	Robert Shannon	27	1	27	1
18	DF	(Australia)	Tom Haythornthwaite	18(3)	4	21	4
19	DF	(South Korea)	Yoon Sang-chul	16(7)	4	23	4
20	GK	(Australia)	Brad Swancott	1	0	1	0
21	MF	(Australia)	Joshua Maguire	0(7)	0	7	0
22	DF	(Australia)	Joshua Ferguson	0(1)	0	1	0

=== Clean sheets ===
Rank	No.	Pos	Nat	Name	National Soccer League	Total
1	1	GK	(England)	Bob Catlin	8	8
Total					8	8
