= 1992–93 National Soccer League =

Australian soccer season

NSL 1992-93
- League: National Soccer League
- Sport: Association football
- Duration: 1992–93
- Teams: 14

NSL season
- Champions: Marconi Fairfield
- Top scorer: Francis Awaritefe (19)

National Soccer League seasons
- ← 1991–92 1993–94 →

The 1992–93 National Soccer League season, was the 17th season of the National Soccer League in Australia.

== Teams ==
| Team | Home city | Home ground |
|---|---|---|
| Adelaide City | Adelaide | Hindmarsh Stadium |
| Brisbane United | Brisbane | Perry Park |
| Heidelberg United | Melbourne | Olympic Village |
| Marconi Fairfield | Sydney | Marconi Stadium |
| Melbourne CSC | Melbourne | Somers Street Stadium |
| Morwell Falcons | Morwell | Falcons Park |
| Newcastle Breakers | Newcastle | Breakers Stadium |
| Parramatta Eagles | Sydney | Melita Stadium |
| Preston Makedonia | Melbourne | Connor Reserve |
| South Melbourne | Melbourne | Middle Park |
| Sydney CSC | Sydney | Edensor Park |
| Sydney Olympic | Sydney | St George Stadium |
| West Adelaide | Adelaide | Hindmarsh Stadium |
| Wollongong City Wolves | Wollongong | Brandon Park |

== Regular season ==
=== League table ===
| Pos | Team | Pld | W | D | L | GF | GA | GD | Pts | Qualification or relegation |
|---|---|---|---|---|---|---|---|---|---|---|
| 1 | South Melbourne | 26 | 18 | 4 | 4 | 51 | 23 | +28 | 58 | Qualification for the Finals series |
| 2 | Marconi Fairfield (C) | 26 | 17 | 2 | 7 | 57 | 31 | +26 | 53 | Qualification for the Finals series |
| 3 | Adelaide City | 26 | 12 | 5 | 9 | 37 | 34 | +3 | 41 | Qualification for the Finals series |
| 4 | Wollongong City | 26 | 11 | 6 | 9 | 33 | 27 | +6 | 39 | Qualification for the Finals series |
| 5 | West Adelaide | 26 | 12 | 3 | 11 | 43 | 39 | +4 | 39 | Qualification for the Finals series |
| 6 | Parramatta Eagles | 26 | 11 | 6 | 9 | 39 | 41 | −2 | 39 | Qualification for the Finals series |
| 7 | Sydney CSC | 26 | 12 | 3 | 11 | 36 | 41 | −5 | 39 | |
| 8 | Newcastle Breakers | 26 | 10 | 8 | 8 | 38 | 29 | +9 | 38 | |
| 9 | Sydney Olympic | 26 | 10 | 4 | 12 | 36 | 31 | +5 | 34 | |
| 10 | Melbourne Croatia | 26 | 10 | 4 | 12 | 38 | 39 | −1 | 34 | |
| 11 | Heidelberg United | 26 | 7 | 9 | 10 | 30 | 40 | −10 | 30 | |
| 12 | Morwell Falcons | 26 | 7 | 7 | 12 | 29 | 43 | −14 | 28 | |
| 13 | Preston Makedonia (R) | 26 | 6 | 4 | 16 | 28 | 45 | −17 | 18 (Note: Preston Makedonia deducted 4 points for crowd disturbances.) | Relegation to the Victorian Premier League |
| 14 | Brisbane United | 26 | 5 | 3 | 18 | 32 | 64 | −32 | 18 | |

Updated to match(es) played on unknown. Source: rsssf.com
Rules for classification: 1) points; 2) goal difference; 3) number of goals scored.
(C) Champions; (R) Relegated

== Finals series ==
Elimination finals
3 | Adelaide City | 0 | 2 | (2)
5 | West Adelaide | 1 | 2 | (2)
4 | Wollongong City | 3 | 1 | (4)
6 | Parramatta Eagles | 0 | 2 | (2)

Semifinals
1 | South Melbourne | 0
2 | Marconi Fairfield | 1
3 | Adelaide City | 4
4 | Wollongong City | 0

Preliminary final
1 | South Melbourne | 1
3 | Adelaide City | 3

Grand final
2 | Marconi Fairfield | 1
3 | Adelaide City | 0

== Individual awards ==
- Player of the Year: Paul Trimboli (South Melbourne)
- U-21 Player of the Year: Steve Corica (Marconi Fairfield)
- Top Scorer: Francis Awaritefe (South Melbourne) - 19 goals
- Coach of the Year: Jim Pyrgolios (South Melbourne)
