= Pierre Essers =

Dutch former footballer

Personal information
- Full name: Pierre Essers
- Date of birth: 20 February 1959 (age 67)
- Place of birth: Maastricht, Netherlands
- Positions: Striker; midfielder

Senior career*
Years	Team	Apps	(Gls)
1977–1979	MVV	2	(0)
1979–1983	Patro Eisden		
1983–1985	Hasselt		
1985–1986	Charleroi		
1986–1987	Assent		
1987	Bourges		
1988	Charleroi		
1988–1989	FC Homburg	27	(1)
1989–1991	Charleroi		
1991–1992	Walsall	1	(0)
1991–1992	Newcastle Breakers	1	(0)
- * Club domestic league appearances and goals

Pierre Essers (born 20 February 1959 in Maastricht, Netherlands) is a Dutch retired footballer who played as a striker or midfielder.

Much-travelled Essers played for clubs in his native Maastricht as well as in Belgium, France, Germany, England and Australia.

== See also ==
- Football in Netherlands
- List of football clubs in the Netherlands
