= Ian Heddle =

Scottish footballer

Personal information
- Date of birth: 21 March 1963 (age 63)
- Place of birth: Dunfermline, Scotland
- Position: Midfielder

Youth career
- Dunfermline Railway

Senior career*
Years	Team	Apps	(Gls)
1983−1987	Dunfermline Athletic	41	(6)
1987−1991	St Johnstone	138	(18)
1991−1992	Newcastle Breakers	26	(0)
1992−1996	Forfar Athletic	115	(15)
1996−1998	Brechin City	33	(1)
- Kelty Hearts
Total		353	(40)
- * Club domestic league appearances and goals

Ian Heddle (born 21 March 1963) is a Scottish former footballer who played for Dunfermline Athletic, St Johnstone, Forfar Athletic and Brechin City in the Scottish Football League. He also had a brief stint with Newcastle Breakers in the Australian National Soccer League.

== Sexual offences ==
In June 2024, Heddle pled guilty to the sexual assault of a child in Thailand and possession of over 270,000 indecent images of children. Police found videos of Heddle abusing a child while on a trip to Thailand in 2019, which led to his arrest. Heddle was initially charged for the possession of the indecent images at Edinburgh Airport in 2023. During the investigation, police also uncovered evidence of "contact offending" involving Heddle and an unknown young female.

On 30 July 2024, Heddle was given a six-year extended sentence, with four years in custody and two years on licence once released back into the community. He was also placed on the sex offenders' register indefinitely.
