= Colin Tuaa =

New Zealand footballer

Personal information
- Full name: Colin W Tuaa
- Date of birth: 15 March 1968 (age 58)
- Place of birth: Auckland, New Zealand
- Position: Forward

Senior career*
Years	Team	Apps	(Gls)
ante 1983–1988	Papatoetoe	0	(0)
1989–1991	Miramar Rangers		
1991-1992	Newcastle Breakers	7	(1)

International career
1983–1988	New Zealand	9	(1)

Managerial career
- 2007–2008: Auckland City
- * Club domestic league appearances and goals

Colin Tuaa is a football player turned manager who represented New Zealand as a player.

== Career ==
Tuaa's club career involved 275 New Zealand National League appearances and 83 goals.

Tuaa made 10 A-International appearances for New Zealand between 1983 and 1988, scoring 1 goal.He also had one season in the Australian National Soccer League with Newcastle Breakers.

In 2007 Tuaa took charge of the New Zealand U-17 team at the FIFA U-17 World Cup in Korea.

In addition to his role as U-17 coach, Tuaa is head coach at Auckland City FC, having previously coached Nelson Suburbs and Youngheart Manawatu.
