= Steve Maxwell =

American fitness coach

Stephen Maxwell, better known as Steve Maxwell (December 3, 1952), is an American fitness coach, physical educator, and Brazilian Jiu-Jitsu instructor. Maxwell was named one of the top 100 trainers in the United States by Men's Journal.

== Professional background ==
Maxwell was the first man to teach kettlebell classes in the United States. He holds a master's degree in Exercise Science from West Chester University.

Maxwell trains professional athletes including players for the Phillies, Dodgers, and Eagles. He also has worked with various US Government agencies, including the DEA, Secret Service, and FBI as well as many Brazilian Jiu-Jitsu academies throughout the country. Maxwell travels around the world leading seminars in strength conditioning, Brazilian Jiu-Jitsu, kettlebells, and joint mobility.

Maxwell had owned and operated Maxercise Gym, in Philadelphia, PA for 16 years.

== Grappling ==
Maxwell has a long history of competitive grappling. He wrestled competitively through high school and college, and then in the US Army. He is the first American to earn a black belt from Relson Gracie.

=== Jiu-Jitsu accreditations ===
- 1997 National Purple Belt Champion GJJTA
- 1998 Runner-up Purple Belt GJJTA
- 1999 Purple Belt Pan American Champion
- 2000 Brown Belt Senior World Champion
- 2000 Brown Belt Senior Pan American Champion
- 2001 Brown Belt Senior World Champion
- 2002 Black Belt Senior Pan American Champion
- 2002 Black Belt Senior World Champion
- 2004 Black Belt Senior Pan American Champion
- 2006 Black Belt Senior Pan American Champion

== Personal life ==
Maxwell is the father of World Champion and four times Pan American Champion Zak Maxwell and his ex-wife DC Maxwell is also a black belt under Saulo Ribeiro with several tournament accomplishments.
