= Dominic Longo =

Australian soccer player

Personal information
- Full name: Dominic Longo
- Place of birth: Hobart, Tasmania, Australia
- Position: Defender

Youth career
- Hobart Juventus

Senior career*
Years	Team	Apps	(Gls)
1988	AIS		
1989–1990	Blacktown City		
1990–1991	St. George	11	(1)
1991	Blacktown City		
1991–1992	Newcastle Breakers	20	(0)
1992–1996	Cercle Brugge		
1996–2004	Marconi		
2004	Port Kembla		
2004–2005	Wollongong City		

International career
1993–1998	Australia	13	(0)
Medal record
Representing Australia
Men's Association football
OFC Nations Cup
Runner-up	1998 Australia
- * Club domestic league appearances and goals

Dominic Longo (born 23 August 1970) is an Australian retired football (soccer) player. He was an Australian Institute of Sport scholarship holder.

Longo played for the Australian national football team between 1993 and 1998.

== Honours ==
Australia

- OFC Nations Cup: runner-up 1998
