= Andrew Koczka =

Australian soccer player

Personal information
- Date of birth: 9 September 1965 (age 61)
- Place of birth: Annandale, Australia
- Height: 1.88 m (6 ft 2 in)
- Position: Midfielder

Senior career*
Years	Team	Apps	(Gls)
1983–1991	St. George Saints	177	(25)
1991–1993	Newcastle Breakers	40	(5)

International career
1988–1989	Australia	5	(0)
- * Club domestic league appearances and goals

Andrew Koczka (born 9 September 1965) is an Australian former soccer player who played at both professional and international levels, as a midfielder.

== Career ==
Koczka played club football in Australia for St. George Saints and Newcastle Breakers.

Koczka made the first of five appearances for Australia in March 1988 in an Olympic qualification match against Taiwan in Adelaide. He also competed at the 1988 Summer Olympics, making one appearance in the tournament. Citing business interests, Koczka retired from international football in 1990.
