= Shane Pryce =

Australian soccer player and coach

Personal information
- Date of birth: 18 August 1973
- Place of birth: Australia
- Position(s): Defender

Senior career*
Years	Team	Apps	(Gls)
- Adamstown Rosebud FC
1995-2000	Newcastle Breakers FC	129	(17)
2000-2003	Perth Glory FC	79	(2)
2003	Hougang United FC		
- Charlestown Azzurri FC
- Inglewood United FC
- *Club domestic league appearances and goals

Shane Pryce (born 18 August 1973 in Australia) is an Australian retired soccer player and coach, who last coached for Perth side Inglewood United FC in 2012.

== Career ==
Pryce started his career with Adamstown Rosebud, which he said "was the old school of train hard, play hard, drink hard". In 2000, he signed for Perth Glory due to Newcastle Breakers' financial problems, transitioning from a semi-professional to a full-time team. After playing professionally in the Singaporean S.League, Pryce had a chance to join Brisbane Roar in the newly formed A-League, but the move did not happen because of injury.
