= Clayton Zane =

Australian soccer player and coach

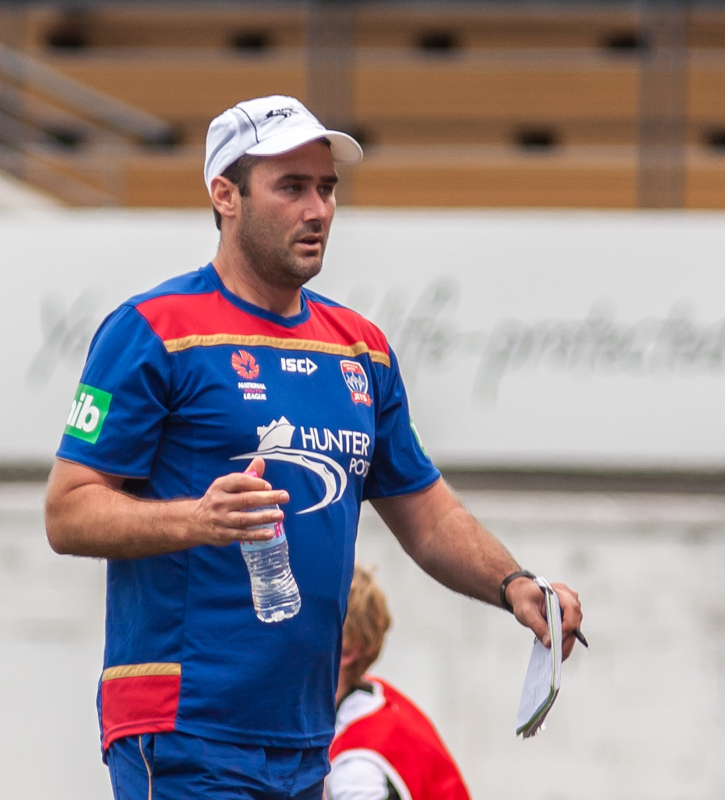
- Zane in 2012

Personal information
- Full name: Clayton Zane
- Date of birth: 12 July 1977 (age 49)
- Place of birth: Newcastle, Australia
- Height: 1.93 m (6 ft 4 in)
- Position: Striker

Youth career
- 1985–1993: Cessnock City Hornets
- 1993–1995: Adamstown Rosebud

Senior career*
Years	Team	Apps	(Gls)
1995–1998	Newcastle Breakers	70	(17)
1995–2000	Northern Spirit	57	(6)
2000	Molde	14	(0)
2001–2002	Lillestrøm	29	(18)
2002–2005	Anderlecht	10	(2)
Total		163	(43)

International career
1996–1997	Australia U20	3	(3)
1998–2000	Australia U23	15	(9)
2000–2001	Australia	14	(6)

Managerial career
- 2011–2012: Newcastle Jets (W-League)
- 2012–2014: Newcastle Jets Youth
- 2014: Newcastle Jets
- 2014–15: Newcastle Jets (assistant)
- 2016–19: Newcastle Jets (assistant)
- 2020-: New Lambton FC (Technical Director)
Medal record
Men's association football
Representing Australia
FIFA Confederations Cup
Third place	2001 Japan–South Korea
OFC Nations Cup
Winner	2000 Tahiti
OFC U-20 Championship
Winner	1997 Tahiti
- * Club domestic league appearances and goals

Clayton Zane (born 12 July 1977) is an Australian association football coach and former player, who played as a striker.

In the 2001 season, he was the top scorer and awarded the Kniksen award as Striker of the Year in Norway. He earned 14 caps for the Australia national team, scoring six goals. His last club as a player was R.S.C. Anderlecht, where a two-year-long injury prematurely ended his career in late 2005.

Following his retirement from playing Zane worked as a coach at Newcastle Jets, serving as a head coach in 2014.

== Club career ==
Zane was first brought to Europe as a relative unknown by Norwegian team Molde. After scoring no goals in 14 matches he was sold to Lillestrøm. In his first season in Lillestrøm he ended top scorer of the Norwegian Premier League with 17 goals and he was voted Norwegian Player of the Year some weeks later. He was then sold to Belgian club R.S.C. Anderlecht in 2002 where he scored twice in ten games.

== International career ==
Zane represented the Australia national team at the 2001 Confederations Cup and is best remembered for scoring the only goal when Australia defeated subsequent champion France in the group stage. He scored a hat-trick for Australia against Cook Islands in June 2000. Zane was a member of the Australian squad at the 2000 Summer Olympics in Sydney.

== Coaching career ==
On 9 August 2011, it was announced that Zane had signed a contract to be the coach of the Newcastle Jets W-League team.

On 8 June 2012, he was announced as the youth team coach of the Newcastle United Jets Youth Squad.

In January 2014 Newcastle Jets head coach Gary van Egmond was sacked due to poor results and Zane was appointed interim head coach until the end of the season. The club chose to appoint Phil Stubbins as head coach of the club for the following season and returned Zane to the position of 1st team assistant coach.

Zane, along with goalkeeping coach Neil Young and strength & conditioning coach Andrew Packer were sacked as part of a club cleanout of players and staff.

On 7 September 2016, Zane became the caretaker coach of the Newcastle Jets after the termination of Scott Miller. Zane is regarded as well liked by the playing group and has a "Calming presence".

== Career statistics ==
Appearances and goals by national team and year
National team	Year	Apps	Goals
Australia	2000	9	5
Australia	2001	5	1
Total		14	6

Scores and results list Australia's goal tally first, score column indicates score after each Zane goal.

List of international goals scored by Clayton Zane
No.	Date	Venue	Opponent	Score	Result	Competition
1	19 June 2000	Stade Pater, Papeete, Tahiti	Cook Islands	15–0	17–0	2000 OFC Nations Cup
2	19 June 2000	Stade Pater, Papeete, Tahiti	Cook Islands	16–0	17–0	2000 OFC Nations Cup
3	19 June 2000	Stade Pater, Papeete, Tahiti	Cook Islands	17–0	17–0	2000 OFC Nations Cup
4	23 June 2000	Stade Pater, Papeete, Tahiti	Solomon Islands	2–0	6–0	2000 OFC Nations Cup
5	23 June 2000	Stade Pater, Papeete, Tahiti	Solomon Islands	3–0	6–0	2000 OFC Nations Cup
6	1 June 2001	Daegu Stadium, Daegu, South Korea	France	1–0	1–0	2001 FIFA Confederations Cup

== Managerial statistics ==
As of 1 October 2017

Team	Nat	From	To	Record				
Team	Nat	From	To	G	W	D	L	Win %
Newcastle Jets FC W-League	(Australia)	August 2011	June 2012	10	4	0	6	40.00
Newcastle Jets FC Youth	(Australia)	June 2012	January 2014	48	20	7	21	41.67
Newcastle Jets	(Australia)	20 January 2014	5 May 2014	12	5	2	5	41.67
Newcastle Jets FC Youth	(Australia)	11 September 2015	1 October 2017	0	0	0	0	—
Total				70	29	9	32	41.43

== Honours ==
Australia

- FIFA Confederations Cup: 3rd place, 2001
- OFC Nations Cup: 2000

Australia U-20

- OFC U-19 Men's Championship: 1997

Individual

- Norwegian Premier League top scorer: 2001
- Kniksen award: Striker of the Year 2001
