= Melita Stadium =

Multi-use stadium in Sydney, New South Wales

- Interactive map of Melita Stadium
- Location: Everley Road, South Granville
- Coordinates: 33°52′11″S 151°0′42″E
- Owner: Cumberland City Council
- Capacity: 10,000
- Surface: Grass

Tenant
- Parramatta FC

Melita Stadium is a multi-use stadium in Sydney, Australia. It is mainly used for football and is the home ground for Parramatta FC team and the Parramatta Ladyhawks Women's Super League team. The stadium has a capacity of 10,000 people.

Melita Stadium is home to the Maltese national rugby league team.
