= Brad Maloney =

Australian soccer player and coach

Personal information
- Full name: Bradley John Maloney
- Date of birth: 19 January 1972 (age 54)
- Place of birth: Sydney, Australia
- Position: Midfielder

Team information
- Current team: Saudi Arabia Under-17 ( Assistant head coach)

Senior career*
Years	Team	Apps	(Gls)
1990–1991	A.P.I.A. Leichhardt	25	(2)
1991–1993	Newcastle Breakers	40	(8)
1993–1995	Sydney Olympic	37	(7)
1995–2000	Marconi	143	(47)
1995	→ Guangzhou Apollo	1	(0)
2000–2002	Perth Glory	41	(13)
2002–2003	Parramatta Power	23	(5)
2003–2004	Marconi	19	(7)

International career^{‡}
1991	Australia U20		
1992	Australia U23		
1998–2000	Australia	6	(2)

Managerial career
- 2014–2018: Malaysia (assistant)
- 2014–2018: Malaysia U23 (assistant)
- 2019–2021: Malaysia U19
- 2021–2022: Malaysia U23
- 2022–2025: Australia U17
- 2026-: Saudi Arabia U17 (assistant)
Medal record
Representing Australia
Men's Association football
OFC Nations Cup
Runner-up	1998 Australia
- * Club domestic league appearances and goals as of 10:04, 29 May 2009 (UTC) ‡ National team caps and goals as of 10:04, 29 June 2019 (UTC)

Brad Maloney (born 19 January 1972) is an Australian soccer coach, he is former head coach of Australia national under-17 soccer team.

As a player, he was an Australian Institute of Sport scholarship holder, and in his senior career played for several National Soccer League clubs, including Marconi Fairfield, Perth Glory and Newcastle Breakers.

== Career statistics ==
=== International ===
Appearances and goals by national team and year
National team	Year	Apps	Goals
Australia	1998	4	2
Australia	2000	2	0
Total		6	2

Scores and results list Australia's goal tally first, score column indicates score after each Maloney goal.

List of international goals scored by Brad Maloney
No.	Date	Venue	Opponent	Score	Result	Competition	Ref.
1	28 September 1998	Lang Park, Brisbane, Australia	Cook Islands	5–0	16–0	1998 OFC Nations Cup	
2	28 September 1998	Lang Park, Brisbane, Australia	Cook Islands	16–0	16–0	1998 OFC Nations Cup	

== Honours ==
Australia

- OFC Nations Cup: runner-up 1998
