= Warren Spink =

Soccer player (born 1966)

Personal information
- Full name: Warren John Spink
- Date of birth: 4 October 1966 (age 60)
- Place of birth: Luton, England
- Position: Striker

Youth career
- 1983–1984: AIS

Senior career*
Years	Team	Apps	(Gls)
1985–1987	Preston Makedonia	24	(8)
1988	Footscray JUST	61	(21)
1989–1991	Preston Makedonia	72	(27)
1991	Singapore FA		
1992	Avala	7	(5)
1992	Westgate		(2)
1992–1994	Newcastle Breakers	45	(28)
1994–1996	Morwell Falcons	46	(12)
1996–1997	South Melbourne	19	(6)
1997–1998	Geylang United		
1998–1999	Preston Lions	24	(13)
2000	Bulleen Zebras	42	(18)

International career
1988–1997	Australia	38	(9)

Managerial career
- 2015: Cooks Hill United
Medal record
Representing Australia
Men's Association football
OFC Nations Cup
Winner	1996 Oceania
- * Club domestic league appearances and goals

Warren Spink (born 4 October 1966) is a former soccer player. Born in England, he made 38 appearances for the Australia national team scoring 9 goals, and also represented Australia at under-20 and under-23 levels.

He played for several Australian club sides, as well as in the Malaysian League for the Singapore FA side and the S.League for Geylang United.

Spink was appointed head coach of Cooks Hill United for the 2015 Northern NSW State League Division 1 season.

== Honours ==
Australia

- OFC Nations Cup: 1996
