= Rod Brown (soccer) =

Australian former soccer player

Personal information
- Date of birth: 27 January 1964 (age 62)
- Position: Striker

Youth career
- 1982: AIS

Senior career*
Years	Team	Apps	(Gls)
1983-1986	Marconi	71	(50)
1987-1992	APIA-Leichhardt	97	(35)
1992-1994	Newcastle Breakers	45	(12)
1994-1998	Brisbane Strikers	105	(40)

International career
1985-1987	Australia	2	(0)
- * Club domestic league appearances and goals

Rod Brown (born 27 January 1964) is an Australian former soccer player. Brown earned seven caps, including two full international caps, for the Socceroos. Both those full international caps were against New Zealand in 1987.

Brown also played for several clubs in the National Soccer League. He scored the second goal in the Brisbane Strikers 2–0 win over Sydney United in the 1996-97 NSL Grand Final at Lang Park. When he retired he held the record for most NSL goals scored (137 goals).

He is the father of former Melbourne Victory and current player for Brisbane Roar Corey Brown.
