= Brandon Park =

Sports venue in Wollongong, New South Wales

- Interactive map of Brandon Park
- Location: Fairy Meadow, Wollongong.
- Coordinates: 34.4034°S 150.8987°E
- Owner: Wollongong City Council
- Operator: University of Wollongong
- Capacity: 15,000
- Surface: Grass

Construction
- Demolished: 2003 (re-purposed)

Tenant
- Wollongong Wolves (1988–2000)

The former Brandon Park at Fairy Meadow was the home ground of the Wollongong Wolves FC in the defunct National Soccer League from 1988 until 2000. The old site was then leased to University of Wollongong to be used as a satellite site named the Innovation Campus.

== History and usage ==
Brandon Park was the host of many various events throughout its history. It was most notable as the home ground of Wollongong Wolves FC. The Wolves played in the highest level of competitive Australian soccer, the National Soccer League. The club played out of Brandon Park from 1988 until University of Wollongong saw potential in the site as the home of their new Innovation Campus. Wollongong Wolves and Wollongong Olympic FC both had leases on the ground until 2008 but were coerced to leave the site. On 1 November 2002, Brandon Park was formally transferred from the Wollongong Sportsground Trust to the University of Wollongong and in 2003 was demolished.

Brandon Park also hosted a Midnight Oil concert in 1986 and a Socceroos game in 1996.
