= Francis Awaritefe =

Soccer player (born 1964)

Personal information
- Full name: Francis Edgar Awaritefe
- Date of birth: 18 April 1964 (age 62)
- Place of birth: London, England
- Position: Striker

Senior career*
Years	Team	Apps	(Gls)
- Wimbledon
1984–1986	Tooting & Mitcham United	37	(12)
1986–1988	Sutton United	65	(24)
1988	→ Barnet (loan)	5	(1)
1989–1992	Melbourne Knights	98	(43)
1992	North Geelong Warriors	10	(10)
1992–1995	South Melbourne	73	(34)
1995–2000	Marconi Stallions	120	(39)
2000–2001	Sydney United	22	(7)
2001–2008	Rockdale City Suns	12	(3)

International career
1993–1996	Australia	3	(1)
- * Club domestic league appearances and goals

Francis Edgar Awaritefe (born 18 April 1964) is a former professional soccer player. Born in England, he made three appearances for Australia scoring once. He was Director of Football at Melbourne Victory.

== Early life ==
Awaritefe was born in London, England to Nigerian parents. He moved to Nigeria at the age of 4, and moved to Australia in adulthood where he was nationalized. He has a son, Reuben Awaritefe, who had played for Central Coast Mariners Academy and Western Sydney Wanderers Youth.

== Playing career ==
Awaritefe performed well for Sutton United, but was sacked by the club after a violent altercation with Enfield goalkeeper Andy Pape.

== Administrative career ==
On 21 June 2011, he was signed by Melbourne Victory as their new Director of Football on a two-year deal, replacing Gary Cole, with Mehmet Durakovic signed as the club's new manager on the same day.

However, after a brief five-month stint in his job as the Director of Football with Melbourne Victory, Awaritefe was axed by Melbourne Victory, after a run of poor results.

He appeared on the Australian television program Nerds FC.

Awaritefe is as at February 2019 vice-president of FIFPro (International Federation of Professional Footballers) and has been with Craig Foster participating in the campaign to free Hakeem al-Araibi.
