= The Gardens Greyhound and Sporting Complex =

Stadium in Newcastle, New South Wales, Australia

Coordinates: 32°53′36″S 151°40′57″E

Ladbrokes Gardens
- The Gardens/Newcastle Greyhounds
- Interactive map of Ladbrokes Gardens
- Full name: The Gardens Greyhound & Sports Complex
- Former names: Topper Stadium; Breakers Stadium; Mitre 10 Stadium
- Address: 104 Sandgate Road, Birmingham Gardens NSW 2287; Birmingham Gardens; Australia
- Location: Newcastle New South Wales
- Owner: Greyhound Racing New South Wales
- Operator: Greyhound Racing New South Wales (Administrators)
- Capacity: 3000 (2000 seated)
- Surface: Grass
- Scoreboard: Yes
- Screen: No
- Field shape: Oval
- Current use: Greyhound Racing and Sports

Construction
- Opened: 1991

Tenants
- Greyhound Racing New South Wales (Greyhound racing in Australia) (2023-present); The Gardens Greyhound Racing Club (Greyhound racing in Australia) (2014-2023); Newcastle Breakers (NSL) (1991 - 2000); Hunter Mariners (Super League) (1997); Wallsend FC

Website
- https://www.thedogs.com.au/tracks/the-gardens

Ladbrokes Gardens is an Australian stadium located in Newcastle, New South Wales. The complex is known as Newcastle Greyhounds when it was used as a greyhound racing venue. It was the former home of the Newcastle Breakers, who played in the National Soccer League (NSL) from 1991 until 2000. It was also the home ground of the short-lived Hunter Mariners rugby league team, who participated in the only season of the Super League in 1997. The stadium is currently used by soccer team Wallsend FC.

== History ==
The ground was primarily used for soccer, hosting the Newcastle Breakers during their tenure in the National Soccer League. It was later used by rugby league team Hunter Mariners. Despite redevelopment in 2005 and 2006 which added a greyhound running track, the stadium is still used for soccer and rugby league with Wallsend FC a current tenant.

=== Naming ===
The stadium was named Breakers Stadium after the Newcastle Breakers. In the early 1990s it was sponsored by hardware chain Mitre 10 and known as Mitre 10 Stadium. In the mid-1990s, sports manufacturer Topper sponsored both the team and the ground, and was known as Topper Stadium. When the company went into administration, it withdrew its sponsorship, and it reverted to its original name. The stadium became known as the Gardens Greyhound & Sporting Complex, and is also referred to as Newcastle Greyhounds.

== Structure and facilities ==
The single stand on the eastern side holds 2,000 general viewing seats with corporate facilities behind. It also has a restaurant/bistro below the stadium and change rooms for the sport teams that play there.
