= Knights Stadium (Melbourne) =

Australian soccer stadium

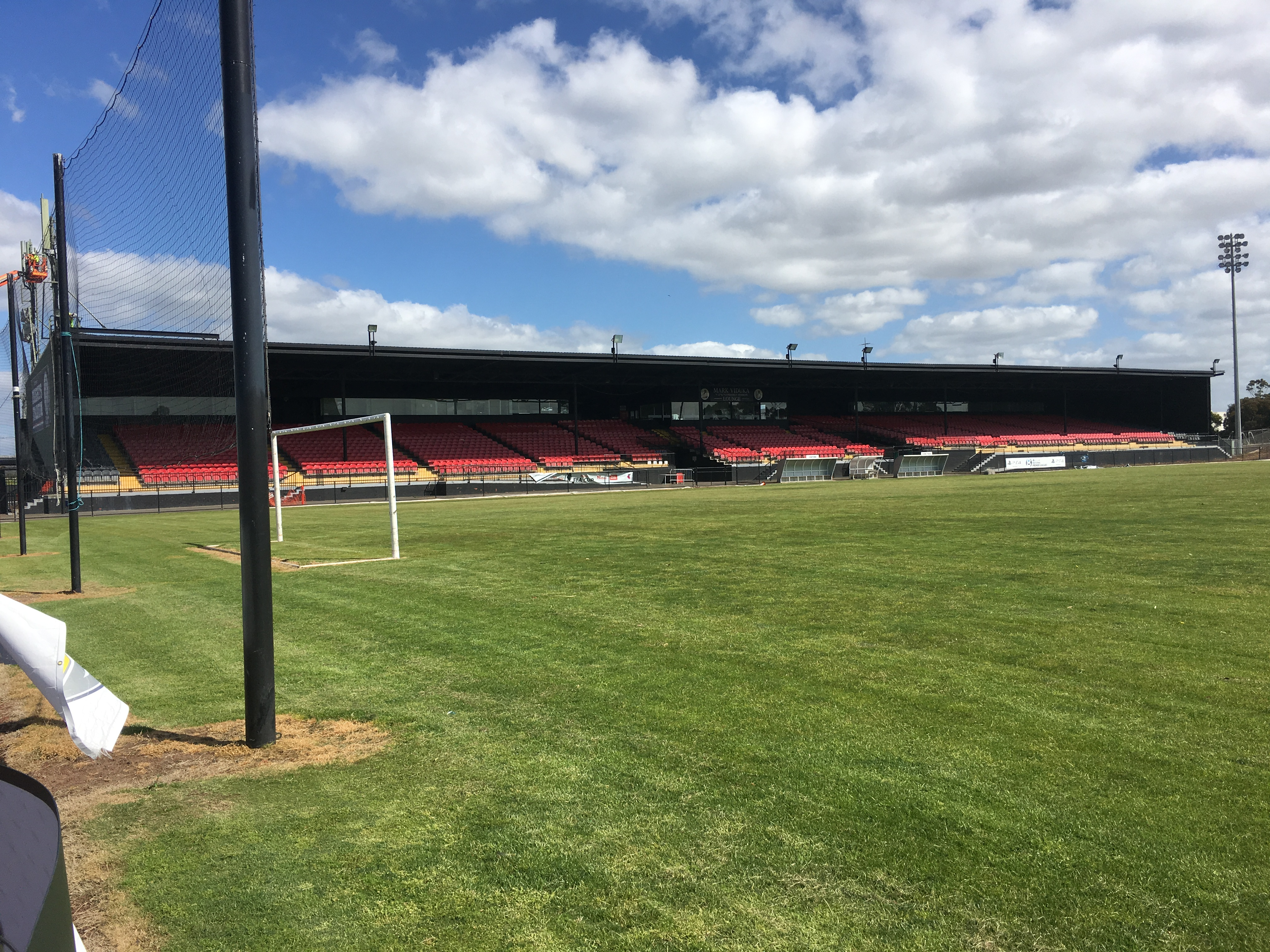
- Knights Stadium in 2016
- Interactive map of Knights Stadium
- Former names: Melbourne Croatia Sports Centre, Croatian Sports Centre
- Location: Sunshine North, Victoria
- Coordinates: 37°45′44″S 144°50′43″E
- Owner: Melbourne Croatia Soccer Club Inc.
- Operator: Melbourne Croatia Soccer Club Inc.
- Capacity: 15,000 (venue capacity); 3,000 (seating capacity)
- Surface: Grass

Construction
- Groundbreaking: 1985
- Opened: 1989
- Cost: $3,800,000 (1995)

Tenant
- Melbourne Knights

Knights Stadium (known as Tompsett Stadium due to naming rights) is an Australian association football stadium in Sunshine North, a suburb of Melbourne, Victoria.

Built in 1989, it is used by the Melbourne Knights as a home ground in the NPL Victoria competition, and previously in the National Soccer League (NSL). The Knights were one of only a handful of clubs in the NSL to actually own their home ground.

The land at Somers Street, which had been a Village drive through cinema, was bought and developed largely through donations and volunteer work from the local Croatian community. The idea was that if 1000 people each donated $300 that would equal $300,000, more than enough to purchase the land.

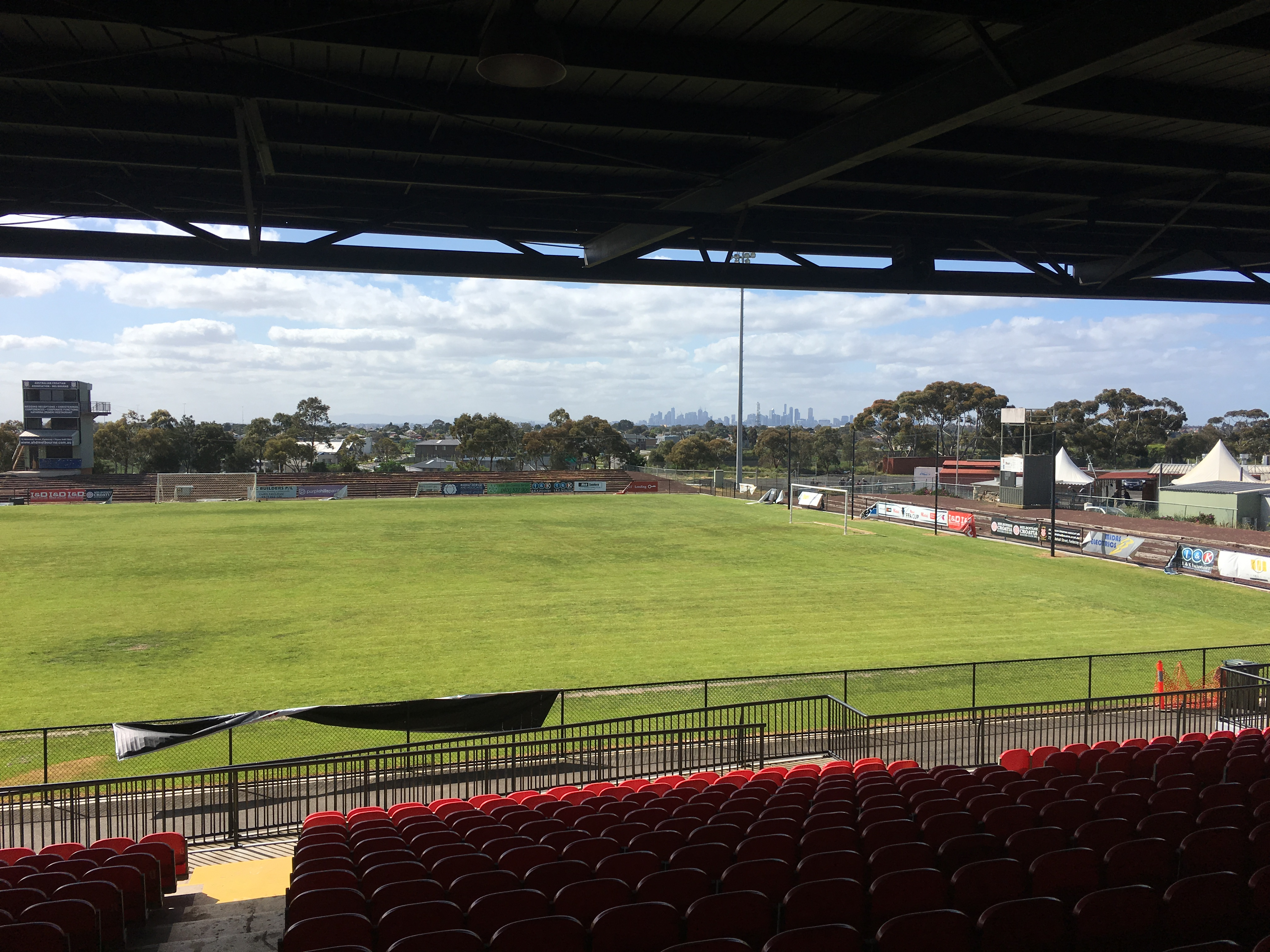
View of the Melbourne CBD from the Mark Viduka Stand.

The stadium holds approximately 15,000 people. It consists of a seated main stand (the Mark Viduka Stand) which has a capacity of 4,000 and open standing-room terracing around the rest of the stadium. The largest crowd at the stadium came in 2000 at a National Soccer League match between the Melbourne Knights and South Melbourne, it drew a crowd of 11,500.

The Stadium complex covers around 12.5 acres (51,000 m^{2}). It has three pitches, including the main pitch. The complex also contains the Melbourne Croatia club rooms and the Knights Sports Gym (an open to the public member's boxing / fitness gymnasium under the stadium). The facility has two car parks with 700 spaces.

The stadium is also home to the Melbourne Croatia Soccer Club, which currently owns the stadium with the Melbourne Knights serving as tenants. This came about in 2006 when the Melbourne Knights and Melbourne Croatia Soccer Club Inc. separated and become two separate legal entities.

The beginning of 2008 saw Knights Stadium facilities receive its most significant face-lift since the grandstand was first built with the main pitch being re-laid, as well as renovations on both the grandstand and terraces.

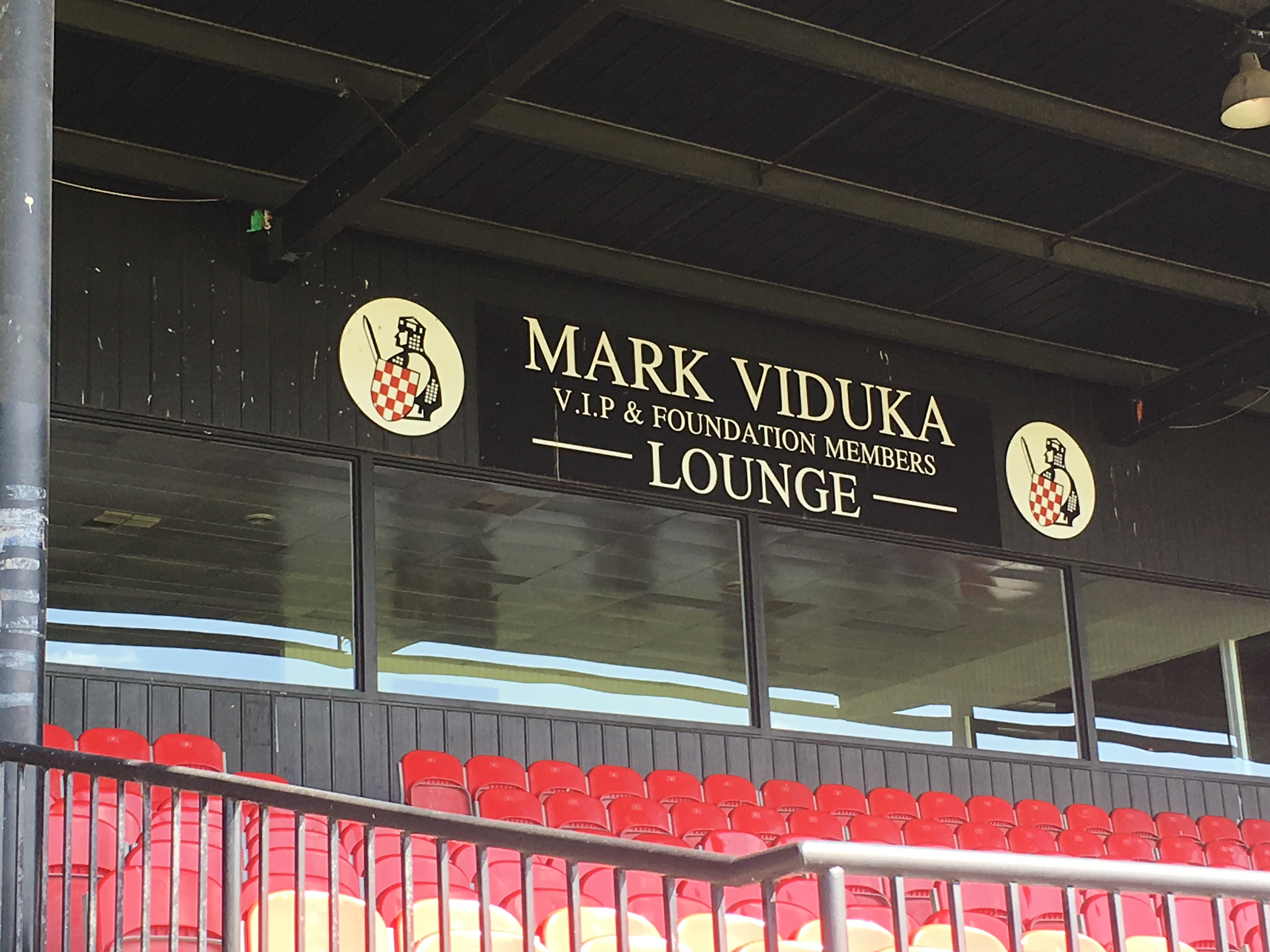
Club legend Mark Viduka is recognised at the stadium.

In the 2009 season the stadium's name was changed from Knights Stadium to Mansion Stadium, after online betting giant Mansion88, became the club's major sponsor and bought the naming rights to the stadium. This was a temporary naming deal for the 2009 season. Their sponsorship deal has since ended and the name then returned to that of Knights Stadium.

In 2011, the club replaced 900 old and broken seats in order to host the first round of the 2011 Australasian Supercross Championships.

In 2016, Knights spent around $100,000 on Stadium upgrades, including further asphalting of the car-park and a replacement of the old, tall fence, with a smaller, more viewer-friendly, fence, bringing it in line with most other premium stadiums around the State.

In 2024, Knights Stadium was renamed Tompsett Stadium following the acquisition of the naming rights by construction company Tompsett Asphalt.
