= Newcastle Breakers FC =

Newcastle Breakers
- Full name: Newcastle Breakers Football Club
- Nickname: Breakers
- Founded: 1991
- Dissolved: 2000
- Ground: Breakers Stadium
- League: National Soccer League
Home colours	Away colours

Newcastle Breakers FC are a defunct Australian football (soccer) club. Formed out of elements of the Newcastle Austral club, they participated in the National Soccer League from season 1991/1992, until their dissolution in 1999/2000. The club fared poorly on the field in its nine seasons in the national league, failing to reach the finals at every attempt. The club's demise led to the creation of Newcastle United FC (later known as Newcastle Jets).

Chart of yearly table positions for Newcastle Breakers in NSL

== Notable former players ==
- (New Zealand) Robert Ironside
- (New Zealand) Clint Gosling
- (Australia) Shane Pryce
- (Australia) Damien Brown
- (Australia) John Buonavoglia
- (Australia) Clayton Zane
- (England) (Australia) Bob Catlin
- (Australia) Rod Brown
- (Australia) Mark Jones
- (Australia) Brad Maloney
- (Australia) Andy Harper
- (Australia) Michael Gibson
- (Australia) Troy Halpin
- (Australia) Graham Jennings
- (South Korea) Yoon Sang-chul
- (Australia) Darren Stewart
- (Australia) Warren Spink

== Notable former coaches ==
- (Australia) John Kosmina
- (Australia) Lee Sterrey
