= 1996–97 Collingwood Warriors SC season =

Only season in existence of Collingwood Warriors SC

Collingwood Warriors
1996–97 season
- Head Coach: Zoran Matić
- Stadium: Victoria Park; Olympic Park
- National Soccer League: 13th
- NSL Cup: Winners
- Top goalscorer: League: Con Boutsianis; Goran Lozanovski; Kimon Taliadoros (7 each); All: Con Boutsianis; Kimon Taliadoros; Andrew Vlahos (8 each)
- Biggest win: 6–2 vs. Canberra Cosmos (10 March 1997); National Soccer League
- Biggest defeat: 0–7 vs. Sydney United (8 December 1996); National Soccer League
Home colours	Away colours	Third colours

The 1996–97 season was Collingwood Warriors' only season in their history and in the National Soccer League. In addition to the domestic league, Collingwood Warriors participated in the final NSL Cup. Collingwood Warriors finished 13th in their National Soccer League season, and won the NSL Cup winning 1–0 in the Final against Marconi Fairfield.

== Players ==
Note: Flags indicate national team as defined under FIFA eligibility rules; some limited exceptions apply. Players may hold more than one non-FIFA nationality.

No.	Pos.	Nation	Player
1	GK	AUS	Dean Anastasiadis
3	DF	AUS	George Jolevski
6	MF	AUS	Carlo Talladira
7	FW	AUS	Andrew Vlahos
8	MF	AUS	Con Boutsianis
9	FW	AUS	Kimon Taliadoros
10	MF	AUS	Ernie Tapai

No.	Pos.	Nation	Player
11	MF	AUS	Goran Lozanovski
12	DF	AUS	Steven Iosifidis
14	MF	AUS	Tom Karapatsos
15	DF	AUS	Leigh Tsoumerkas
19	DF	AUS	George Georgiades
20	DF	AUS	Alexander Pryhodko

== Competitions ==
=== Overview ===
Competition	First match	Last match	Starting round	Final position	Record							
Competition	First match	Last match	Starting round	Final position	Pld	W	D	L	GF	GA	GD	Win %
National Soccer League	13 October 1996	20 April 1997	Matchday 1	13th	26	6	9	11	32	44	−12	23.08
NSL Cup	15 September 1996	6 October 1996	Round of 16	Final	5	3	1	1	6	2	+4	60.00
Total					31	9	10	12	38	46	−8	29.03

Source: Competitions

=== National Soccer League ===
==== League table ====
Pos	Team	Pld	W	D	L	GF	GA	GD	Pts	Qualification
1	Sydney United	26	17	5	4	67	33	+34	56	Qualification for the Finals series
2	Brisbane Strikers (C)	26	15	2	9	55	40	+15	47	Qualification for the Finals series
3	South Melbourne	26	14	4	8	39	25	+14	46	Qualification for the Finals series
4	Adelaide City	26	11	10	5	32	22	+10	43	Qualification for the Finals series
5	Marconi Fairfield	26	12	4	10	41	37	+4	40	Qualification for the Finals series
6	Melbourne Knights	26	11	6	9	36	32	+4	39	Qualification for the Finals series
7	Perth Glory	26	11	5	10	48	41	+7	38	
8	West Adelaide	26	10	3	13	39	51	−12	33	
9	UTS Olympic	26	8	8	10	41	46	−5	32	
10	Wollongong Wolves	26	8	8	10	42	48	−6	32	
11	Newcastle Breakers	26	7	9	10	40	46	−6	30	
12	Gippsland Falcons	26	8	6	12	33	41	−8	30	
13	Collingwood Warriors	26	6	9	11	32	44	−12	27	
14	Canberra Cosmos	26	2	5	19	30	69	−39	11	

Updated to match(es) played on unknown. Source: rsssf.com
Rules for classification: 1) points; 2) goal difference; 3) number of goals scored.
(C) Champions

==== Matches ====
13 October 1996 1	Collingwood Warriors	3–0	Melbourne Knights	Melbourne
	Boutsianis 5'; Taliadoros 68', 72'	Report		Stadium: Victoria Park; Attendance: 10,200; Referee: G. Connolly

19 October 1996 2	Marconi Fairfield	1–1	Collingwood Warriors	Sydney
	Bingley 90'	Report	MacNicol 55'	Stadium: Marconi Stadium; Attendance: 6,237; Referee: D. Crawford

3 November 1996 4	West Adelaide	1–2	Collingwood Warriors	Adelaide
	Slager 22'	Report	Cerracchio 24', 68'	Stadium: Hindmarsh Stadium; Attendance: G. Connelly; Referee: 5,611

10 November 1996 5	Collingwood Warriors	0–0	Perth Glory	Melbourne
		Report		Stadium: Victoria Park; Attendance: 5,504; Referee: W. Dade

16 November 1996 6	Canberra Cosmos	2–2	Collingwood Warriors	Canberra
	Kelly 64' (pen.); Wilson 90'	Report	Taliadoros 30'; MacNicol 49'	Stadium: Bruce Stadium; Attendance: 2,600; Referee: M. Shield

22 November 1996 7	Newcastle Breakers	1–1	Collingwood Warriors	Newcastle
	Zane 1'	Report	MacNicol 25'	Stadium: Breakers Stadium; Attendance: 1,370; Referee: M. Shield

1 December 1996 8	Collingwood Warriors	0–1	Gippsland Falcons	Melbourne
18:00 AEDT		Report	Krncevic 13'	Stadium: Victoria Park; Attendance: 3,110; Referee: Eugene Brazzale

8 December 1996 9	Sydney United	7–0	Collingwood Warriors	Sydney
	Zdrilic 13', 16', 38', 80'; Rudan 42'; Moric 56'; Milicic 89'	Report		Stadium: Edensor Park; Attendance: 5,451; Referee: B. Hugo

15 December 1996 10	Collingwood Warriors	1–3	Adelaide City	Melbourne
	Taliadoros 41'	Report	Mennillo 33', 90'; Brooks 42'	Stadium: Victoria Park; Attendance: 3,655; Referee: M. Shield

21 December 1996 11	Brisbane Strikers	5–2	Collingwood Warriors	Brisbane
	Farina 6', 49'; Battistin 24' (pen.); Slater 79'; Wehrman 83'	Report	Vlahos 19', 36'	Stadium: Suncorp Stadium; Attendance: 4,194; Referee: S. Micallef

23 December 1996 3	Collingwood Warriors	0–0	UTS Olympic	Melbourne
		Report		Stadium: Victoria Park; Attendance: 1,000; Referee: Eugene Brazzale

29 December 1996 12	Collingwood Warriors	1–1	Wollongong City	Melbourne
	Cerrachio 30'	Report	Joseski 8'	Stadium: Victoria Park; Attendance: 2,987; Referee: G. Connelly

5 January 1997 13	South Melbourne	4–0	Collingwood Warriors	Melbourne
	Spink 28', 75'; Trimboli 54'; Allsopp 85'	Report		Stadium: Lakeside Stadium; Attendance: 12,652; Referee: M. Shield

12 January 1997 14	Collingwood Warriors	0–0	South Melbourne	Melbourne
		Report		Stadium: Victoria Park; Attendance: 6,000; Referee: E. Lennie

2 February 1997 15	Melbourne Knights	0–1	Collingwood Warriors	Melbourne
		Report	Boutsianis 44'	Stadium: Somers St Stadium; Attendance: 7,917; Referee: G. Connolly

9 February 1997 16	Collingwood Warriors	1–2	Marconi Fairfield	Melbourne
	Boutsianis 33'	Report	Awaritefe 41', 83'	Stadium: Victoria Park; Attendance: 2,345; Referee: S. Micallef

16 February 1997 17	Sydney Olympic	3–0 (Awarded)	Collingwood Warriors	Sydney
		Report		Stadium: Belmore Oval; Attendance: N/A; Referee: N/A

23 February 1997 18	Collingwood Warriors	3–0	West Adelaide	Melbourne
	Taliadoros 32', 54'; Tapai 44'	Report		Stadium: Victoria Park; Attendance: 2,000; Referee: J. Markovski

2 March 1997 19	Perth Glory	0–2	Collingwood Warriors	Perth
		Report	Boutsianis 13'; Di Iorio 61'	Stadium: Perth Oval; Attendance: 10,694; Referee: B. Danella

10 March 1997 20	Collingwood Warriors	6–2	Canberra Cosmos	Melbourne
	Vlahos 37', 82'; Boutsianis 44', 55'; Di Iorio 65'; Taliadoros 89'	Report		Stadium: Victoria Park; Attendance: 3,220; Referee: W. Dade

16 March 1997 21	Collingwood Warriors	0–0	Newcastle Breakers	Melbourne
		Report		Stadium: Victoria Park; Attendance: 3,311; Referee: G. Leverton

22 March 1997 22	Gippsland Falcons	1–0	Collingwood Warriors	Melbourne
	Thompson 72'	Report		Stadium: Falcons Park; Attendance: 3,063; Referee: E. Brazzale

31 March 1997 23	Collingwood Warriors	2–3	Sydney United	Melbourne
	Di Iorio 15'; Vlahos 56'	Report	Enes 25'; Milicic 69'; Zdrilic 88'	Stadium: Olympic Park; Attendance: 1,700; Referee: G. Connolly

6 April 1997 24	Adelaide City	1–0	Collingwood Warriors	Adelaide
	Ivanovic 27'			Stadium: Hindmarsh Stadium; Attendance: 5,232; Referee: M. Shield

13 April 1997 25	Collingwood Warriors	0–2	Brisbane Strikers	Melbourne
		Report	Knipe 68'; Brown 75'	Stadium: Olympic Park; Attendance: 600; Referee: C. Diomis

20 April 1997 26	Wollongong City	4–4	Collingwood Warriors	Wollongong
	Chipperfield 22'; Spencer 43'; Horsley 57'; Sevin 76'	Report	Vlahos 14'; Boutsianis 34'; Della Rocca 45'; Di Iorio 58'	Stadium: Brandon Park; Attendance: 4,396; Referee: G. Leverton

=== NSL Cup ===
15 September 1996 Round of 16	South Australian XI	1–0	Collingwood Warriors	Adelaide
	Maxwell 17'	Report		Stadium: Hindmarsh Stadium; Referee: W. Dade

18 September 1996 Round of 16	Collingwood Warriors	2–0	South Australian XI	Adelaide
	Babic 18'; Taliadoros 91'	Report		Stadium: Hindmarsh Stadium

22 September 1996 Quarter-finals	Adelaide City	0–0 (1–3 p)	Collingwood Warriors
		Report		Referee: C. Diomis

27 September 1996 Semi-finals	South Melbourne	1–3	Collingwood Warriors	Melbourne
	Spink 47'	Report	Vlahos 25', 74'; Taliadoros 70'	Stadium: Lakeside Stadium

6 October 1996 Final	Collingwood Warriors	1–0	Marconi Fairfield	Melbourne
	Boutsianis 46'	Report		Stadium: Lakeside Stadium; Attendance: 2,327; Referee: Eugene Brazzale

== Statistics ==
=== Appearances and goals ===
Players with no appearances not included in the list.

No.	Pos.	Nat.	Name	National Soccer League		Total	
No.	Pos.	Nat.	Name	Apps	Goals	Apps	Goals
	GK	(Australia)	Dean Anastasiadis	0(3)	0	3	0
	FW	(Australia)	Vlado Babic	0(2)	0	2	0
	MF	(Australia)	Con Boutsianis	15(5)	7	20	7
	DF	(Australia)	Frank Catalano	5(4)	0	9	0
	MF	(Australia)	Enrico Cerracchio	17(2)	0	19	3
	DF	(Australia)	Alan Davidson	10	0	10	0
	MF	(Australia)	Paul Della Rocca	11	1	11	1
	FW	(Australia)	Peter Di Iorio	4(8)	4	12	4
	DF	(Australia)	Dean Fak	13	0	13	0
	DF	(Australia)	George Jolevski	9(2)	0	11	0
	GK	(Australia)	Frank Juric	25	0	25	0
	MF	(Australia)	Dejan Kaplanovic	1	0	1	0
	MF	(Australia)	Tom Karapatsos	1(1)	0	2	0
	MF	(Australia)	Terry Kearns	0(1)	0	1	0
	MF	(Australia)	Goran Lozanovski	17	7	17	7
	MF	(Australia)	Brian MacNicol	9(10)	3	19	3
	MF	(Soviet Union)	Aleksandr Pryhodko	3	0	3	0
	MF	(Australia)	Alan Scott	14(1)	0	15	0
	MF	(Australia)	Mark Silic	12	0	12	0
	FW	(Australia)	Kimon Taliadoros	21(1)	7	22	7
	MF	(Australia)	Carlo Talladira	20	0	20	0
	MF	(Australia)	Ernie Tapai	24	1	24	1
	MF	(Australia)	Leigh Tsoumerakas	2	0	2	0
	FW	(Australia)	Andrew Vlahos	24	6	24	6
	DF	(Australia)	Joe Vrkic	14(1)	0	15	0
	DF	(Australia)	John Waddell	4(1)	0	5	0
