= List of Collingwood Warriors SC players =

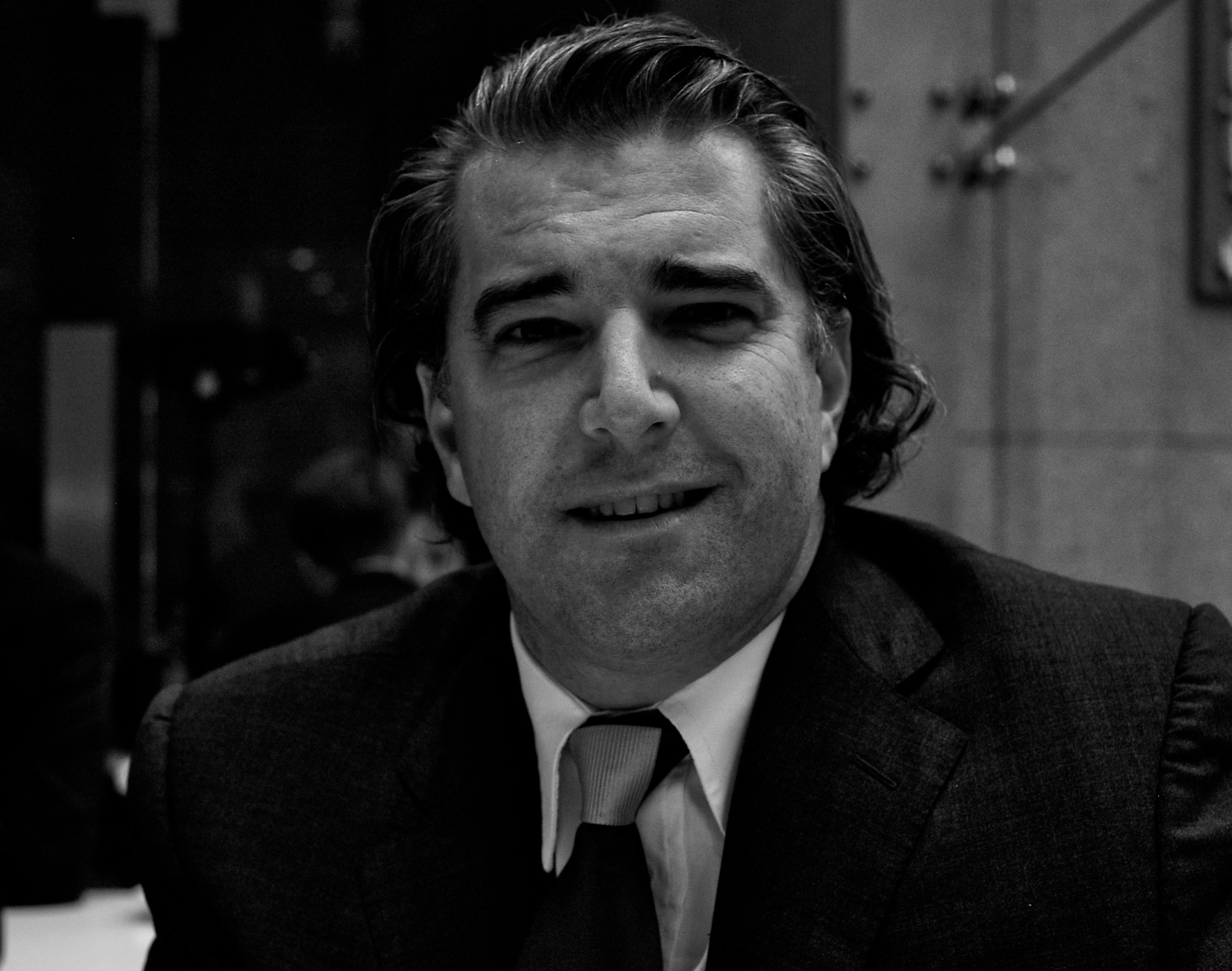
Kimon Taliadoros co-held the all-time goalscoring record for Collingwood Warriors with eight goals.

Collingwood Warriors Soccer Club, an association football club based in Collingwood, Melbourne, was founded in 1996 in affiliation between Australian Football League club Collingwood and Greek backed former NSL club Heidelberg United, that was then trading as 'Melbourne Warriors'. They were admitted into the National Soccer League for the 1996–97 season. They dissolved in 1997 after the end of the 1996–97 National Soccer League.

Frank Juric held the record for the greatest number of league appearances for Collingwood Warriors. The Australian goalkeeper played 25 times for the club. The club's goalscoring record was held by Con Boutsianis, Kimon Taliadoros and Andrew Vlahos who scored 8 goals in all competitions.

== Key ==
- The list is ordered first by date of debut, and then if necessary in alphabetical order.
- Appearances as a substitute are included.

Positions key
GK	Goalkeeper
DF	Defender
MF	Midfielder
FW	Forward

Nationality
Unless otherwise noted, the nationality of a player is determined by the country/countries which he has played for, or if said person has not played international football, their country of birth.
Club career
Club career is defined as the first and last calendar years in which the player appeared for the club in any of the competitions listed below.
Total appearances and Total goals
Total appearances and goals comprise those in the National Soccer League

== Players ==
List of Collingwood Warriors SC players
Player	Nationality	Pos	Club career	Starts	Subs	Total	Goals
Player	Nationality	Pos	Club career	Appearances			Goals
Con Boutsianis	Australia	MF	1996–1997	15	5	20	7
Enrico Cerracchio	Australia	MF	1996–1997	17	2	19	3
Dean Fak	Australia	DF	1996–1997	13	0	13	0
George Jolevski	Australia	DF	1996–1997	9	2	11	0
Frank Juric	Australia	GK	1996–1997	25	0	25	0
Tom Karapatsos	Australia	MF	1996	1	1	2	0
Goran Lozanovski	Australia	MF	1996–1997	17	0	17	7
Brian MacNicol	Australia	MF	1996–1997	9	10	19	3
Alan Scott	Australia	MF	1996–1997	14	1	15	0
Kimon Taliadoros	Australia	FW	1996–1997	21	1	22	7
Carlo Talladira	Australia	FW	1996–1997	20	0	20	0
Ernie Tapai	Australia	FW	1996–1997	24	0	24	1
Andrew Vlahos	Australia	FW	1996–1997	24	0	24	6
John Waddell	Australia	DF	1996–1997	4	1	5	0
Vlado Babic	Australia	FW	1996	0	2	2	0
Mark Silic	Australia	MF	1996–1997	12	0	12	0
Dejan Kaplanovic	Australia	MF	1996	1	0	1	0
Aleksandr Pryhodko	Soviet Union	MF	1996	3	0	3	0
Leigh Tsoumerakas	Australia	MF	1996	2	0	2	0
Peter Di Iorio	Australia	FW	1996–1997	4	8	12	4
Joe Vrkic	Australia	DF	1996–1997	14	1	15	0
Dean Anastasiadis	Australia	GK	1996–1997	0	3	3	0
Alan Davidson	Australia	DF	1997	10	0	10	0
Paul Della Rocca	Australia	MF	1997	11	0	11	1
Terry Kearns	Australia	MF	1997	0	1	1	0
Frank Catalano	Australia	DF	1997	5	4	9	0
