= 1996 NSL Cup final (October) =

- Event: 1996–97 NSL Cup
Collingwood Warriors	Marconi Fairfield
1	0
- Date: 6 October 1996
- Venue: Bob Jane Stadium, Melbourne
- Referee: Eugene Brazzale
- Attendance: 2,327
- Weather: Heavy rain

The 1996 NSL Cup final (October) was the final match of the 1996–97 NSL Cup, the 21st and final season of the National Soccer League Cup. It was played at Bob Jane Stadium in Melbourne on 6 October 1996 between Collingwood Warriors and Marconi Fairfield. Collingwood Warriors won the match 1–0 for their first NSL Cup title.

== Route to the final ==
Collingwood Warriors		Round	Marconi Fairfield	
Opposition	Score	Round	Opposition	Score
SASF XI	2–1 (agg.)	R1	Gippsland Falcons	4–2 (agg.)
Adelaide City (A)	0–0 (a.e.t.) (3–1 p)	QF	Newcastle Breakers (H)	3–1
South Melbourne (A)	3–1	SF	Brisbane Strikers (H)	5–0
Key: (H) = Home venue; (A) = Away venue

== Match ==
=== Details ===
6 October 1996
15:00 AEST

Collingwood Warriors	1–0	Marconi Fairfield
Boutsianis 46'	Report

Bob Jane Stadium, Melbourne
Attendance: 2,327
Referee: Eddie Lennie

GK	1	(Australia) Dean Anastasiadis
DF	12	(Australia) John Waddell
DF	15	(Australia) Dean Fak
MF	2	(Australia) Alan Scott
MF	6	(Australia) Carlo Taladira
MF	7	(Australia) Andrew Vlahos
MF	8	(Australia) Con Boutsianis		(substituted off) 74'
MF	11	(Australia) Goran Lozanovski
MF	17	(Australia) Enrico Cerrachio
FW	9	(Australia) Kimon Taliadoros	(yellow card) 50'
FW	10	(Australia) Ernie Tapai
Substitutes:
MF	13	(Australia) Tom Karapatsos
MF	14	(Australia) Brian MacNicol
FW	21	(Australia) Vlado Babic		(substituted on) 74'
Head Coach:
(Federal Republic of Yugoslavia) Zoran Matić

GK	1	(Australia) Bob Catlin
DF	4	(Australia) Robert Stanton	(yellow card) 87'
DF	6	(Australia) Luke Casserly
DF	14	(Australia) Dominic Longo
DF	18	(Australia) Paul Souris
MF	5	(Australia) Matthew Bingley
FW	7	(Australia) Andy Harper
MF	9	(Australia) Craig Foster
MF	10	(Australia) Brad Maloney		(substituted off) 76'
MF	19	(Australia) Brendan Renaud
FW	17	(Australia) Francis Awaritefe		(substituted off) 64'
Substitutes:
DF	13	(Australia) Aaron Holst
MF	23	(Australia) Vlado Zoric		(substituted off) 64'
MF	11	(Australia) Andrew Ravanello		(substituted on) 76'
Head Coach:
(Australia) Manfred Schaefer

Match rules

- 90 minutes
- 30 minutes of extra time if necessary
- Penalty shoot-out if scores still level
