= 1996–97 in Australian soccer =

Soccer in Australia
- Season: 1996–97

Men's soccer
- NSL Premiership: Sydney United
- NSL Championship: Brisbane Strikers
- NSL Cup: Collingwood Warriors

The 1996–97 season was the 28th season of national competitive soccer in Australia and 114th overall.

== National teams ==
=== Men's senior ===
==== Results and fixtures ====
===== Friendlies =====
9 October 1996	Saudi Arabia	0–0	Australia	Riyadh, Saudi Arabia
		Report

18 January 1997	Australia	1–0	New Zealand	Melbourne, Australia
	Bingley 24'	Report		Stadium: Lakeside Stadium; Attendance: 10,496; Referee: Eugene Brazzale (Australia)

22 January 1997	Australia	2–1	South Korea	Brisbane, Australia
	Bingley 36'; Edwards 72'	Report	Seok-ju 76'	Stadium: Suncorp Stadium; Attendance: 15,161; Referee: Simon Micallef (Australia)

25 January 1997	Australia	1–0	Norway	Sydney, Australia
	Hooker 72'	Report		Stadium: Sydney Football Stadium; Attendance: 17,429; Referee: Eddie Lennie (Australia)

12 March 1997	Macedonia	0–1	Australia	Skopje, Macedonia
		Report	A. Vidmar 89'	Stadium: Gradski Stadion; Referee: Slavko Radulovic (Yugoslavia)

2 April 1997	Hungary	1–3	Australia	Budapest, Hungary
	Klausz 31'	Report	A. Vidmar 4', 90'; Muscat 89'	Stadium: Népstadion; Referee: Hermann Albrecht (Germany)

===== 1998 FIFA World Cup qualification =====
====== Second round ======
Pos	Team	Pld	W	D	L	GF	GA	GD	Pts	Qualification
1	Australia (H)	4	4	0	0	26	2	+24	12	Advance to final round
2	Solomon Islands	4	2	0	2	7	21	−14	6	
3	Tahiti	4	1	0	3	2	12	−10	3	

Source: RSSSF
(H) Hosts

11 June 1997	Australia	13–0	Solomon Islands	Sydney, Australia
	Mori 2', 15', 36', 65'; Aloisi 33', 53', 81', 86', 87'; Foster 68'; Tapai 78'; Zelic 80'; Bosnich 88' (pen.)	Report		Stadium: Parramatta Stadium; Attendance: 3,127; Referee: Bruce Grimshaw (New Zealand)

13 June 1997	Australia	5–0	Tahiti	Sydney, Australia
	A. Vidmar 14'; Trimboli 37', 42'; Arnold 47'; Bingley 66'	Report		Stadium: Parramatta Stadium; Attendance: 2,869; Referee: Brian Precious (New Zealand)

17 June 1997	Solomon Islands	2–6	Australia	Sydney, Australia
	Peli 59'; Suri 65'	Report	Slater 15'; Arnold 17'; Zdrilic 38'; Tapai 51'; A. Vidmar 75'	Stadium: Parramatta Stadium; Attendance: 2,122; Referee: Brian Precious (New Zealand)

19 June 1997	Tahiti	0–2	Australia	Sydney, Australia
		Report	Zelic 8'; Trimboli 86'	Stadium: Parramatta Stadium; Attendance: 2,122; Referee: Bruce Grimshaw (New Zealand)

====== Final round ======
28 June 1997 First leg	New Zealand	0–3	Australia	Auckland, New Zealand
		Report		Stadium: North Harbour Stadium; Attendance: 23,000; Referee: Masayoshi Okada (Japan)

===== 1996 OFC Nations Cup =====
====== Knockout stage ======
26 October 1996 Final 1st Leg	Tahiti	0–6	Australia	Papeete, Tahiti
		Report	Tapai 5'; Trimboli 20'; Trajanovski 25', 28', 44', 89'	Stadium: Olympic Stadium; Attendance: 5,000; Referee: Barry Tasker (New Zealand)

1 November 1996 Final 2nd Leg	Australia	5–0 (11–0 agg.)	Tahiti	Canberra, Australia
	Hooker 11'; Trajanovski 21', 36', 54'; Raumati 31' (o.g.)	Report		Stadium: Bruce Stadium; Attendance: 5,000; Referee: Barry Tasker (New Zealand)

===== 1996 Simba Cup =====
Pos	Team	Pld	W	D	L	GF	GA	GD	Pts
1	South Africa (C)	3	2	1	0	3	0	+3	7
2	Australia	3	2	0	1	6	2	+4	6
3	Ghana	3	1	1	1	1	2	−1	4
4	Kenya	3	0	0	3	0	6	−6	0

Source: RSSSF
(C) Champions

14 September 1996	Australia	2–0	Ghana	Durban, South Africa
	Mori 44'; Trimboli 69'	Report		Stadium: Kings Park Stadium; Attendance: 50,000; Referee: Petros Mathabela (South Africa)

18 September 1996	South Africa	2–0	Australia	Johannesburg, South Africa
	Masilela 13'; Williams 71'	Report		Stadium: Johannesburg Athletics Stadium; Attendance: 29,000; Referee: Suleiman Gharib (Kenya)

21 September 1996	Australia	4–0	Kenya	Pretoria, South Africa
	Polak 32'; Spink 36'; Mori 63'; Tobin 78' (pen.)	Report		Stadium: Loftus Versfeld Stadium; Attendance: 50,000; Referee: Ian McLeod (South Africa)

=== Women's senior ===
==== Results and fixtures ====
===== Friendlies =====
4 July 1996	United States	2–1	Australia	Florida, United States
	Foudy 18'; Parlow 81'	Report	Black 5'	Stadium: Tampa Stadium

6 July 1996	United States	2–1	Australia	Florida, United States
	Venturini 2'; Lilly 49'	Report	Boyd 88'	Stadium: Pensacola Soccer Complex

10 July 1996	Australia	2–2	Japan	Florida, United States
	Hughes 39'; Cooper 55'	Report		Stadium: Fort Lauderdale Stadium

11 July 1996	Australia	0–1	China	Florida, United States
		Report

14 July 1996	Australia	1–2	China	Florida, United States
	Swaffer ?'	Report		Stadium: Adidas Soccer Complex

28 February 1997	Australia	0–4	United States	Melbourne, Australia
		Report	Parlow 12'; Venturini 40'; Fotopoulos 72'; Hamm 74'	Stadium: Bob Jane Stadium

2 March 1997	Australia	1–3	United States	Bathurst, Australia
	Hughes 90'	Report	Baumgardt 52'; Lilly 66'; Chastain 74' (pen.)	Stadium: Carrington Park; Attendance: 3,228; Referee: Jenny Bray (Australia)

5 March 1997	Australia	0–3	United States	Canberra, Australia
		Report	Chastain 9'; Foudy 52'; Milbrett 90+3'	Stadium: Bruce Stadium; Attendance: 4,031; Referee: Tamm Peacock (Australia)

===== 1997 Women's U.S. Cup =====
Pos	Team	Pld	W	D	L	GF	GA	GD	Pts
1	United States (C, H)	3	3	0	0	15	1	+14	9
2	Italy	3	2	0	1	5	3	+2	6
3	Australia	3	1	0	2	4	14	−10	3
4	Canada	3	0	0	3	3	9	−6	0

Source: RSSSF
(C) Champions; (H) Hosts

31 May 1997	Italy	3–0	Australia	Salem, United States
	Panico 33'; Carta 44', 75'	Report		Stadium: Grant Field; Attendance: 2,127

5 June 1997	United States	9–1	Australia	Philadelphia, United States
	Milbrett 5'; Parlow 16', 42'; Hamm 19', 32'; Pearce 37'; Lilly 48'; Venturini 56'; Keller 81'	Report	Taylor 75'	Stadium: Upper Dublin High School; Attendance: 4,826

7 June 1997	Australia	3–2	Canada	Philadelphia, United States
	Hughes ?', ?'; Casagrande ?'	Report	O'Neil ?'; Bertini ?'	Stadium: United German Hungarian Club

=== Men's under-23 ===
==== Results and fixtures ====
===== 1996 Summer Olympics =====
====== Group B ======
Pos	Team	Pld	W	D	L	GF	GA	GD	Pts	Qualification
1	France	3	2	1	0	5	2	+3	7	Advance to knockout stage
2	Spain	3	2	1	0	5	3	+2	7	Advance to knockout stage
3	Australia	3	1	0	2	4	6	−2	3	
4	Saudi Arabia	3	0	0	3	2	5	−3	0	

Source: RSSSF

20 July 1996	France	2–0	Australia	Miami, United States
18:30	Pires 11'; Maurice 74'	Report		Stadium: Miami Orange Bowl; Attendance: 14,322; Referee: Roberto Ruben Ruscio (Argentina)

22 July 1996	Australia	2–1	Saudi Arabia	Miami, United States
19:00	Tsekenisa 11'; Viduka 63'	Report	Al-Khilaiwi 37'	Stadium: Miami Orange Bowl; Attendance: 5,997; Referee: Esfandiar Baharmast (United States)

24 July 1996	Spain	3–2	Australia	Miami, United States
19:00	Raúl 40', 90'; Denia 86'	Report	Vidmar 3', 12'	Stadium: Miami Orange Bowl; Attendance: 12,050; Referee: Hugh Dallas (Great Britain)

=== Men's under-20 ===
==== Results and fixtures ====
===== 1997 FIFA World Youth Championship =====
====== Group E ======
Pos	Team	Pld	W	D	L	GF	GA	GD	Pts	Qualification
1	Australia	3	2	1	0	5	3	+2	7	Advance to knockout stage
2	Argentina	3	2	0	1	8	5	+3	6	Advance to knockout stage
3	Canada	3	1	1	1	3	3	0	4	Advance to knockout stage
4	Hungary	3	0	0	3	1	6	−5	0	

Source: RSSSF

18 June 1997	Australia	0–0	Canada	Kangar, Malaysia
20:00		Report		Stadium: Utama Stadium; Attendance: 13,000; Referee: Karl-Erik Nilsson (Sweden)

20 June 1997	Hungary	0–1	Australia	Kangar, Malaysia
17:30		Report	Allsopp 90'	Stadium: Utama Stadium; Attendance: 6,000; Referee: Abderrahim El Arjoun (Morocco)

23 June 1997	Australia	4–3	Argentina	Kangar, Malaysia
20:00	Salapasidis 39', 40', 55', 90' (pen.)	Report	Romeo 9'; Placente 70'; Riquelme 88' (pen.)	Stadium: Utama Stadium; Attendance: 8,000; Referee: Armand Ancion (Belgium)

====== Knockout stage ======
26 June 1997	Australia	0–1	Japan	Kangar, Malaysia
16:30		Report	Yanagisawa 44'	Stadium: Utama Stadium; Attendance: 8,000; Referee: León Padro Borja (Mexico)

===== 1997 OFC U-20 Championship =====
====== First round ======
Pos	Team	Pld	W	D	L	GF	GA	GD	Pts	Qualification
1	Australia	3	3	0	0	23	0	+23	9	Advance to Final
2	New Zealand	3	2	0	1	8	4	+4	6	Advance to Final
3	Fiji	3	1	0	2	5	15	−10	3	Advance to Third place play-off
4	Tahiti (H)	3	0	0	3	2	19	−17	0	Advance to Third place play-off

Source: RSSSF
(H) Hosts

4 January 1997	Australia	10–0	Fiji	Tahiti
		Report

6 January 1997	Australia	3–0	New Zealand	Tahiti
		Report

8 January 1997	Tahiti	0–10	Australia	Tahiti
		Report

====== Final ======
10 January 1997	Australia	2–1	New Zealand	Tahiti
		Report

=== Men's under-17 ===
==== 1997 OFC U-17 Championship ====
===== Group A =====
Pos	Team	Pld	W	D	L	GF	GA	GD	Pts	Qualification
1	Australia	3	3	0	0	26	0	+26	9	Advance to knockout stage
2	Tahiti	3	2	0	1	5	6	−1	6	Advance to knockout stage
3	Fiji	3	1	0	2	10	9	+1	3	
4	Cook Islands	3	0	0	3	0	26	−26	0	

Source: RSSSF

15 April 1997	Australia	14–0	Cook Islands	Christchurch, New Zealand
		Report

17 April 1997	Australia	7–0	Tahiti	Christchurch, New Zealand
		Report

19 April 1997	Fiji	0–5	Australia	Christchurch, New Zealand
		Report

===== Knockout stage =====
22 April 1997 Semi-finals	Australia	4–0	Solomon Islands	Christchurch, New Zealand
		Report

25 April 1997 Final	New Zealand	1–0	Australia	Christchurch, New Zealand
		Report

== Domestic soccer ==
=== National Soccer League ===
Pos	Team	Pld	W	D	L	GF	GA	GD	Pts	Qualification
1	Sydney United	26	17	5	4	67	33	+34	56	Qualification for the Finals series
2	Brisbane Strikers (C)	26	15	2	9	55	40	+15	47	Qualification for the Finals series
3	South Melbourne	26	14	4	8	39	25	+14	46	Qualification for the Finals series
4	Adelaide City	26	11	10	5	32	22	+10	43	Qualification for the Finals series
5	Marconi Fairfield	26	12	4	10	41	37	+4	40	Qualification for the Finals series
6	Melbourne Knights	26	11	6	9	36	32	+4	39	Qualification for the Finals series
7	Perth Glory	26	11	5	10	48	41	+7	38	
8	West Adelaide	26	10	3	13	39	51	−12	33	
9	UTS Olympic	26	8	8	10	41	46	−5	32	
10	Wollongong Wolves	26	8	8	10	42	48	−6	32	
11	Newcastle Breakers	26	7	9	10	40	46	−6	30	
12	Gippsland Falcons	26	8	6	12	33	41	−8	30	
13	Collingwood Warriors	26	6	9	11	32	44	−12	27	
14	Canberra Cosmos	26	2	5	19	30	69	−39	11	

Updated to match(es) played on unknown. Source: rsssf.com
Rules for classification: 1) points; 2) goal difference; 3) number of goals scored.
(C) Champions

==== Grand Final ====
25 May 1997
15:00 AEST

Brisbane Strikers	2–0	Sydney United
Farina 47'; Brown 69'	Reports

Suncorp Stadium, Brisbane
Attendance: 40,446
Referee: Simon Micallef

=== NSL Cup ===
==== Final ====
6 October 1996
15:00 AEST

Collingwood Warriors	1–0	Marconi Fairfield
Boutsianis 46'	Report

Bob Jane Stadium, Melbourne
Attendance: 2,327
Referee: Eddie Lennie
