= Perth Glory FC league record by opponent =

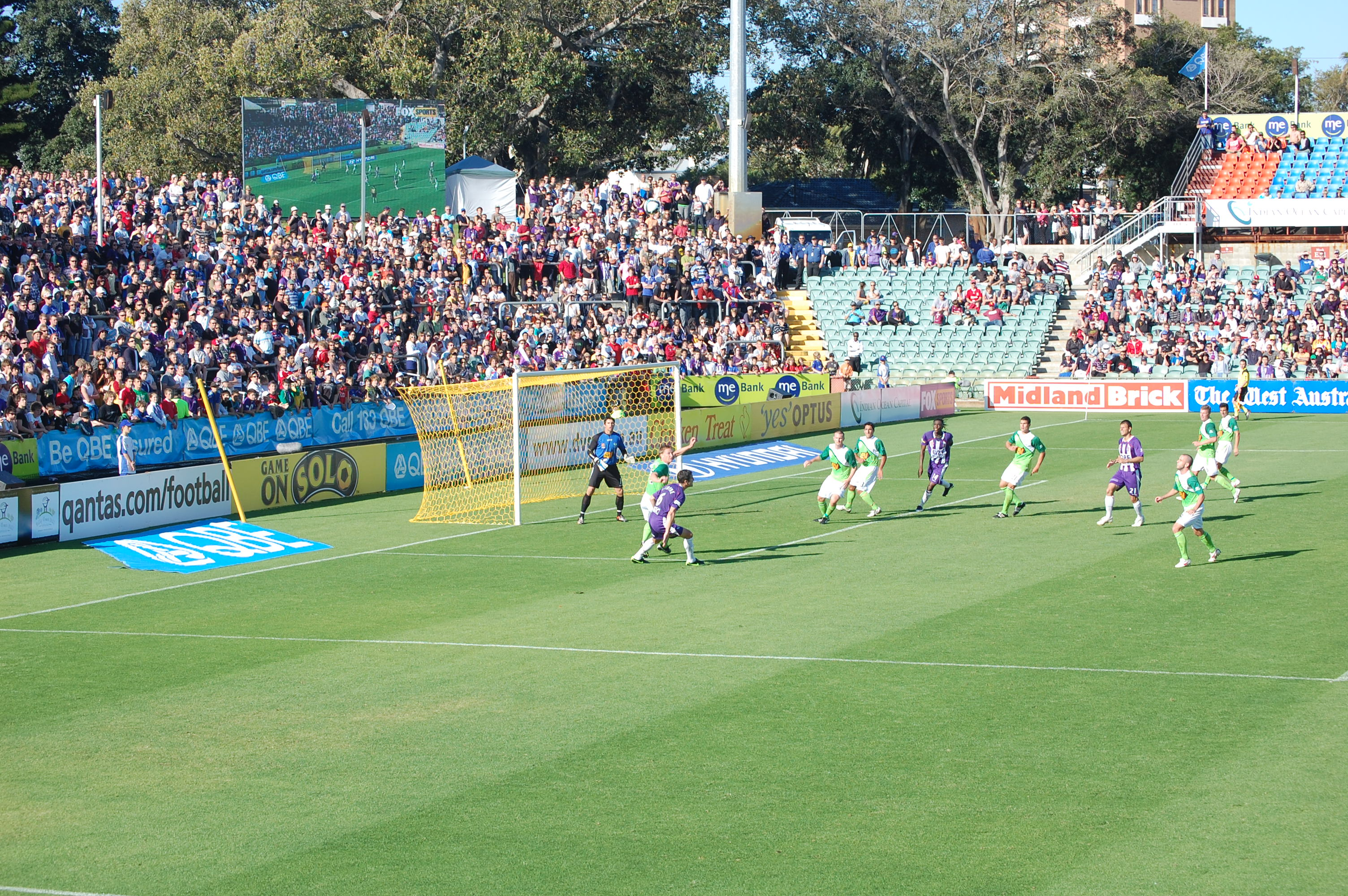
Perth playing against North Queensland Fury in 2009

Perth Glory Football Club is an Australian professional association football club based in Perth. The club was formed in 1995 and played its first competitive match in the first round of the 1996–97 National Soccer League, in October 1996. The Glory has played at its current home ground, Perth Oval, since its foundation. Perth is one of the three inaugural A-League clubs that originally played in the National Soccer League.

Perth Glory's first team have competed in the two national leagues in Australia. Their record against each club faced in the discontinued competition National Soccer League and the A-League is listed below. Perth Glory's first National Soccer League match was against Sydney Olympic, and they met their 31st and most recent different league opponent, Macarthur FC, for the first time in the 2020–21 A-League season. The team that Perth Glory have played most in league competition is the Newcastle Jets, who they first met in the 2000–01 season. The 27 defeats from 48 meetings against Sydney FC is more than they have lost against any other club. Sydney FC have also drawn 12 league encounters with Perth Glory, more than any other club. Perth Glory have recorded more league victories against Newcastle Jets than against any other club; having beaten them 34 times out of 58 attempts.

== Key ==
- The table includes results of matches played by Perth Glory in the National Soccer League and A-League regular season and Finals matches.
- The name used for each opponent is the name they had when Perth Glory most recently played a league match against them.
- The columns headed "First" and "Last" contain the first and most recent seasons in which Perth Glory played league matches against each opponent.
- P = matches played; W = matches won; D = matches drawn; L = matches lost; Win% = percentage of total matches won
- † Clubs with this background and symbol in the "Opponent" column are Perth Glory's divisional rivals in the current season.
- ‡ Clubs with this background and symbol in the "Opponent" column are defunct.

== All-time league record ==
Statistics correct as at match played 1 May 2021

Perth Glory FC league record by opponent
Club	P	W	D	L	P	W	D	L	P	W	D	L	Win%	First	Last	Ref(s)
Club	Home				Away				Total				Win%	First	Last	Ref(s)
Adelaide City	9	6	1	2	9	6	3	0	18	12	4	2	66.67	1996–97	2002–03	
Adelaide United †	24	11	7	6	25	9	4	12	50	20	11	19	40.00	2003–04	2020–21	
Brisbane Roar †	24	9	6	9	22	4	5	13	46	13	11	22	28.26	2005–06	2020–21	
Brisbane Strikers	8	4	0	4	8	4	4	0	16	8	4	4	50.00	1996–97	2003–04	
Canberra Cosmos ‡	6	5	1	0	4	2	1	1	10	7	2	1	70.00	1996–97	2000–01	
Carlton ‡	4	3	1	0	4	2	0	2	8	5	1	2	62.50	1997–98	2000–01	
Central Coast Mariners †	23	11	5	7	24	4	4	16	48	16	9	23	33.33	2005–06	2020–21	
Collingwood Warriors ‡	1	0	0	1	1	0	1	0	2	0	1	1	0.00	1996–97	1996–97	
Eastern Pride	5	4	0	1	5	3	1	1	10	7	1	2	70.00	1996–97	2000–01	
Football Kingz ‡	5	5	0	0	5	3	1	1	10	8	1	1	80.00	1999–2000	2003–04	
Gold Coast United	5	2	1	2	4	0	1	3	9	2	2	5	22.22	2009–10	2011–12	
Macarthur FC †	1	0	1	0	1	0	0	1	2	0	1	1	0.00	2020–21	2020–21	
Marconi-Fairfield	10	4	5	1	9	6	1	2	19	10	6	3	52.63	1996–97	2003–04	
Melbourne City †	15	9	3	3	19	7	7	5	34	16	10	8	47.06	2010–11	2020–21	
Melbourne Knights	10	8	2	0	10	4	4	2	20	12	6	2	60.00	1996–97	2003–04	
Melbourne Victory †	22	12	4	6	24	5	7	12	47	17	11	19	36.17	2005–06	2020–21	
New Zealand Knights ‡	3	3	0	0	3	2	0	1	6	5	0	1	83.33	2005–06	2006–07	
Newcastle Breakers ‡	4	0	0	4	4	2	0	2	8	2	0	6	25.00	1996–97	1999–2000	
Newcastle Jets †	29	21	5	3	30	13	7	10	59	34	12	13	57.63	2000–01	2020–21	
North Queensland Fury ‡	2	0	2	0	4	0	1	3	6	0	3	3	0.00	2009–10	2010–11	
Northern Spirit	7	7	0	0	7	4	1	2	14	11	1	2	78.57	1998–99	2003–04	
Parramatta Power ‡	7	5	0	2	8	3	0	5	15	8	0	7	53.33	1999–2000	2003–04	
South Melbourne	8	7	1	0	8	2	3	3	16	9	4	3	56.25	1996–97	2003–04	
Sydney FC †	25	5	8	12	23	4	4	15	49	9	12	28	18.37	2005–06	2020–21	
Sydney Olympic	11	6	2	3	9	3	2	4	20	9	4	7	45.00	1996–97	2003–04	
Sydney United	8	7	0	1	9	4	2	3	17	11	2	4	64.71	1996–97	2003–04	
Wellington Phoenix †	21	14	1	6	21	5	7	9	44	20	8	16	45.45	2007–08	2020–21	
West Adelaide	3	1	2	0	3	1	0	2	6	2	2	2	33.33	1996–97	1998–99	
Western Sydney Wanderers †	12	6	4	2	12	2	3	7	25	9	7	9	36.00	2012–13	2020–21	
Western United †	0	0	0	0	2	0	1	1	3	0	1	2	0.00	2019–20	2020–21	
Wollongong Wolves	10	5	3	2	9	4	2	3	19	9	5	5	47.37	1996–97	2003–04	
