= 1995–96 NSL Cup =

National Soccer League Cup

Tournament details
- Country: Australia
- Dates: 3–27 January 1996
- Teams: 12

Final positions
- Champions: South Melbourne (2nd title)
- Runners-up: Newcastle Breakers

Tournament statistics
- Matches played: 17
- Goals scored: 49 (2.88 per match)
- Attendance: 39,416 (2,319 per match)
- Top goal scorer: Vaughan Coveny (5 goals)

The 1995–96 NSL Cup was the 20th edition of the NSL Cup, which was the main national association football knockout cup competition in Australia. The NSL Cup was sponsored by Johnnie Walker and known as the Johnnie Walker Cup for sponsorship purposes.

Melbourne Knights were the defending champions, having defeated Heidelberg United to win their first title in the previous season's final, but they were eliminated in the first round by eventual winners South Melbourne.

South Melbourne defeated Newcastle Breakers 3–1 in the final to win their second NSL Cup title.

== Teams ==
The NSL Cup was a knockout competition with 12 teams taking part all trying to reach the Final in January 1996. The competition consisted of the 12 teams from the National Soccer League.

Round	Main date	Number of fixtures	Clubs remaining
First round	Saturday 20 January 1996	12	12 → 6
Quarter-finals	Tuesday 23 January 1996	2	6 → 4
Semi-finals	Thursday 25 January 1996	2	4 → 2
Final	Saturday 27 January 1996	1	2 → 1

== Bracket ==
First round
Adelaide City	1	2	3
Morwell Falcons	0	0	0
Newcastle Breakers	1	1	2
Brisbane Strikers	1	0	1
Sydney Olympic	2	3	5
Wollongong City	3	0	3
South Melbourne	4	0	4
Melbourne Knights	2	1	3
Marconi Fairfield	1	2	3
Sydney United	1	0	1
West Adelaide	1	0	1
Canberra Cosmos	1	1	2

Quarter-finals
Newcastle Breakers	3
Sydney Olympic	1
South Melbourne	3
Marconi Fairfield	2

Semi-finals
Adelaide City	1
Newcastle Breakers	3
South Melbourne	3
Canberra Cosmos	1

Final
Newcastle Breakers	1
South Melbourne	3

== First round ==
Team 1	Agg.	Team 2	1st leg	2nd leg
Adelaide City	3–0	Morwell Falcons	1–0	2–0
Newcastle Breakers	2–1	Brisbane Strikers	1–0	1–1
Sydney Olympic	5–3	Wollongong City	2–3	3–0
South Melbourne	4–3	Melbourne Knights	4–2	0–1
Marconi Fairfield	3–1	Sydney United	1–1	2–0
West Adelaide	1–2	Canberra Cosmos	1–1	0–1

3 January 1996	West Adelaide	1–1	Canberra Cosmos	Adelaide
19:30 ACDT	Day 73'	Report	Dunn 53'	Stadium: Hindmarsh Stadium; Attendance: 2,600; Referee: John Papanicolas

20 January 1996	Canberra Cosmos	1–0	West Adelaide	Canberra
19:00 AEDT	Perinovic 64'	Report		Stadium: Bruce Stadium; Attendance: 2,600; Referee: Gerry Connelly

Canberra Cosmos won 2–1 on aggregate

10 January 1996	Adelaide City	1–0	Morwell Falcons	Adelaide
19:30 ACDT	Mullen 87'	Report		Stadium: Hindmarsh Stadium; Attendance: 1,637; Referee: Wayne Dade

20 January 1996	Morwell Falcons	0–2	Adelaide City	Morwell
19:00 AEDT	Armour 3'; Hassell 51'	Report		Stadium: Falcons Park; Attendance: 500; Referee: Ljupco Naumovski

Adelaide City won 3–0 on aggregate

12 January 1996	Newcastle Breakers	1–0	Brisbane Strikers	Sydney
19:30 AEDT	Sprod 68'	Report		Stadium: Austral Park; Attendance: 1,310; Referee: Con Diomis

20 January 1996	Brisbane Strikers	1–1	Newcastle Breakers	Brisbane
19:00 AEST	Cranney 14'	Report	James 62'	Stadium: Suncorp Stadium; Attendance: 3,149; Referee: Derek Crawford

Newcastle Breakers won 2–1 on aggregate

14 January 1996	South Melbourne	4–2	Melbourne Knights	Melbourne
19:00 AEDT	Panopoulos 21'; Coveny 25', 30', 71'	Report	Bacak 65'; Pondeljak 79'	Stadium: Bob Jane Stadium; Attendance: 1,800; Referee: Gerry Connelly

20 January 1996	Melbourne Knights	1–0	South Melbourne	Melbourne
19:30 AEDT	Pondeljak 47'	Report		Stadium: Knights Stadium; Attendance: 2,000; Referee: John Fraser

South Melbourne won 4–3 on aggregate

14 January 1996	UTS Olympic	2–3	Wollongong City	Sydney
19:00 AEDT	Meredith 43'; Trajanovski 55' (pen.)	Report	Perinich 8', 23'; Luff 68'	Stadium: Leichhardt Oval; Attendance: 2,624; Referee: Simon Micallef

20 January 1996	Wollongong City	0–3	UTS Olympic	Wollongong
19:00 AEDT		Report	Slater 31'; Ardone 38'; Ironside 82'	Stadium: Brandon Park; Attendance: 2,604; Referee: Brett Hugo

Sydney Olympic won 5–3 on aggregate

14 January 1996	Marconi Fairfield	1–1	Sydney United	Sydney
19:00 AEDT	Maloney 38'	Report	Babic 24'	Stadium: Marconi Stadium; Attendance: 5,012; Referee: John Fraser

20 January 1996	Sydney United	0–2	Marconi Fairfield	Sydney
19:00 AEDT		Report	Awaritefe 19'; Stanton 59'	Stadium: Sydney United Sports Centre; Attendance: 1,836; Referee: Simon Micallef

Marconi Fairfield won 3–1 on aggregate

== Quarter-finals ==
Adelaide City and Canberra Cosmos had a bye for the Quarter-finals.

23 January 1996	South Melbourne	3–2	Marconi Fairfield	Melbourne
	Trimboli 40'; Coveny 68'; Allsopp 76'	Report	Awaritefe 9'; Maloney 82'	Stadium: Bob Jane Stadium; Attendance: 2,500; Referee: Gerry Connelly

23 January 1996	Newcastle Breakers	3–1	UTS Olympic	Newcastle
	Moore 35'; Thomas 39'; Halpin 63'	Report	Taliadoros 4' (pen.)	Stadium: Breakers Stadium; Attendance: 1,267; Referee: Simon Micallef

== Semi-finals ==
25 January 1996	Newcastle Breakers	3–1	Adelaide City	Newcastle
	Hickman 40' (pen.); Thomas 41'; James 73'	Report	Hassell 80'	Stadium: Breakers Stadium; Attendance: 1,625; Referee: Con Diomis

25 January 1996	South Melbourne	3–1	Canberra Cosmos	Melbourne
	Allsopp 45'; Damianos 68'; Trimboli 79'	Report	Lemezina 87'	Stadium: Bob Jane Stadium; Attendance: 2,360; Referee: Brett Hugo

== Final ==
27 January 1996

South Melbourne	3–1	Newcastle Breakers
Coveny 22', 74'; Panopoulos 35' (pen.)	Report	Hickman 49'

Bob Jane Stadium, Melbourne
Attendance: 5,000
Referee: Simon Micallef
