= 1994–95 NSL Cup =

National Soccer League Cup

Tournament details
- Country: Australia
- Dates: 30 September – 16 October 1994
- Teams: 14

Final positions
- Champions: Melbourne Knights (1st title)
- Runners-up: Heidelberg United

Tournament statistics
- Matches played: 21
- Attendance: 39,518 (1,882 per match)

The 1994–95 NSL Cup was the 19th edition of the NSL Cup, which was the main national association football knockout cup competition in Australia. The NSL Cup was sponsored by Johnnie Walker and known as the Johnnie Walker Cup for sponsorship purposes.

Parramatta Eagles were the defending champions, having defeated Sydney United to win their first title in the previous season's final, but they were eliminated in the first round by Sydney Olympic.

Melbourne Knights defeated Heidelberg United 6–0 in the final to win their first NSL Cup title.

== Teams ==
The NSL Cup was a knockout competition with 14 teams taking part all trying to reach the Final in October 1994. The competition consisted of the 14 teams from the National Soccer League.

Round	Main date	Number of fixtures	Clubs remaining
First round	Friday 30 September 1994	14	14 → 7
Quarter-finals	Sunday 9 October 1994	4	7 → 4
Semi-finals	Wednesday 12 October 1994	2	4 → 2
Final	Sunday 16 October 1994	1	2 → 1

== Bracket ==
First Round
Adelaide City	2	0	2
West Adelaide (a)	2	0	2
Morwell Falcons	1	2	3
South Melbourne	1	5	6
Melbourne Knights	2	3	5
Melbourne Zebras	0	0	0
Wollongong City	2	0	2
New South Wales U23	3	0	3
Sydney Olympic	3	1	4
Parramatta Eagles	2	1	3
Marconi Fairfield	0	0	0
Heidelberg United	2	0	2
Brisbane Strikers	2	1	3
Sydney United	0	2	2

Quarter-finals
West Adelaide	0
South Melbourne	3
Melbourne Knights	3
New South Wales U23	2
Sydney Olympic	3
Melbourne Zebras	1
Heidelberg United	5
Brisbane Strikers	0

Semi-finals
South Melbourne	1
Melbourne Knights	2
Sydney Olympic	2
Heidelberg United	3

Final
Melbourne Knights	6
Heidelberg United	0

== First round ==
30 September 1994	Adelaide City	2–2	West Adelaide	Adelaide
	Vidmar 18'; Foster 47'	Report	Lazaridis 16'; Cardozo 35'	Stadium: Hindmarsh Stadium; Attendance: 2,484; Referee: John Papanicolas

3 October 1994	West Adelaide	0–0	Adelaide City	Adelaide
		Report		Stadium: Hindmarsh Stadium; Attendance: 4,352; Referee: Michael Ingham

West Adelaide won 2–0 on away goals rule

30 September 1994	Brisbane Strikers	2–0	Sydney United	Brisbane
	Brown 50', 78'	Report		Stadium: Perry Park; Attendance: 1,092; Referee: Doug Prentice

3 October 1994	Sydney United	2–1	Brisbane Strikers	Sydney
	Lamond 45'; Naumovski 90'	Report	Phillips 89'	Stadium: Croatian Sports Centre; Attendance: 1,097; Referee: Neil Jones

Brisbane Strikers won 4–3 on aggregate

30 September 1994	Marconi Fairfield	0–2	Heidelberg United	Sydney
		Report	Kiratzoglou 18'; Tsolakis 40'	Stadium: Marconi Stadium; Attendance: 1,193; Referee: Brett Hugo

2 October 1994	Heidelberg United	0–0	Marconi Fairfield	Melbourne
		Report		Stadium: Olympic Village; Attendance: 858; Referee: John Fraser

Heidelberg United won 2–0 on aggregate

30 September 1994	Morwell Falcons	1–2	South Melbourne	Morwell
	Waddell 60'	Report	Boutsianis 22'; Douglas 44' (o.g.)	Stadium: Morwell Falcons Park; Attendance: 1,766; Referee: John Rutter

2 October 1994	South Melbourne	5–2	Morwell Falcons	Melbourne
	Trimboli 31', 33', 35'; Goutzioulis 44'; Boutsianis 65'	Report	Villani 13'; Markovski 25'	Stadium: Middle Park Soccer Stadium; Referee: Eugene Brazzale

South Melbourne won 7–3 on aggregate

30 September 1994	Sydney Olympic	3–2	Parramatta Eagles	Sydney
	Johnson 63', 78'; Maloney 89'	Report	Gunning 30'; Reda 71'	Stadium: Melita Stadium; Attendance: 1,500; Referee: Con Diomis

3 October 1994	Parramatta Eagles	1–1	Sydney Olympic	Sydney
	Moffitt 74'	Report	Maloney 82'	Stadium: Melita Stadium; Attendance: 4,482; Referee: Rob Davies

Sydney Olympic won 4–3 on aggregate

30 September 1994	Wollongong City	2–3	New South Wales U23	Wollongong
	Coveny 35'; Murray 41'	Report	Boudaher 19'; Smith 25', 35'	Stadium: Brandon Park; Attendance: 192; Referee: Simon Micallef

3 October 1994	New South Wales U23	0–0	Wollongong City	Wollongong
		Report		Stadium: Brandon Park; Referee: Richard Lorenc

New South Wales U23 won 3–2 on aggregate

1 October 1994	Melbourne Knights	0–2	Melbourne Zebras	Melbourne
		Report	Aloisi 61'; Vojtek 74' (o.g.)	Stadium: Croatian Sports Centre; Attendance: 507; Referee: Jim Markovski

4 October 1994	Melbourne Zebras	0–3	Melbourne Knights	Melbourne
		Report	Lapsansky 35'; Grganovic	Stadium: Olympic Park; Attendance: 800; Referee: Cain Naumcevski

Melbourne Knights won 3–2 on aggregate

== Quarter-finals ==
8 October 1994	Melbourne Knights	3–2	New South Wales U-23	Melbourne
	Viduka 39' (pen.), 47', 61'	Report	Bradley 76', 80'	Stadium: Croatian Sports Centre; Attendance: 679; Referee: Gordon Dunster

9 October 1994	Heidelberg United	5–0	Brisbane Strikers	Melbourne
	Vlahos 40'; Vasiliadis 45'; Michalakopoulos 54', 66'; Tsolakis 86'	Report		Stadium: Olympic Village; Attendance: 1,223; Referee: Gerry Connolly

9 October 1994	Sydney Olympic	3–1	Brunswick Zebras	Sydney
	Tome 73'; Johnson 100'; Augerinos 118'	Report	Aloisi 20' (pen.)	Stadium: Marconi Stadium; Attendance: 1,789; Referee: Richard Lorenc

9 October 1994	West Adelaide	0–3	South Melbourne	Adelaide
		Report	Trimboli 99', 104'; Kelic 111'	Stadium: Hindmarsh Stadium; Attendance: 3,405; Referee: Mike Ingham

== Semi-finals ==
12 October 1994	South Melbourne	1–2	Melbourne Knights	Melbourne
	Boutsianis 57'	Report	Viduka 85'; Silic 87'	Stadium: Olympic Park; Attendance: 5,802; Referee: Gerry Connolly

12 October 1994	Sydney Olympic	2–3	Heidelberg United	Sydney
	Milosevic 40'; Juric 75'	Report	Vlahos 15'; Michalakopoulos 86', 90+2'	Stadium: Marconi Stadium; Attendance: 1,797; Referee: Brett Hugo

== Final ==
16 October 1994

Melbourne Knights	6–0	Heidelberg United
Spiteri 30', 70'; Horvat 51'; Biskic 80'; Viduka 86', 87'	Report

Olympic Park, Melbourne
Attendance: 4,500
Referee: Eugene Brazzale
