= 1996–97 NSL Cup =

National Soccer League Cup

Tournament details
- Country: Australia
- Dates: 15 September – 6 October 1996
- Teams: 16

Final positions
- Champions: Collingwood Warriors (1st title)
- Runners-up: Marconi Fairfield

Tournament statistics
- Matches played: 23
- Goals scored: 59 (2.57 per match)
- Top goal scorer: Francis Awaritefe (3 goals)

The 1996–97 NSL Cup was the 21st and final edition of the NSL Cup, which was the main national association football knockout cup competition in Australia. The NSL Cup was sponsored by Johnnie Walker and known as the Johnnie Walker Cup for sponsorship purposes.

South Melbourne were the defending champions, having defeated Newcastle Breakers to win their second title in the previous season's final, but they were eliminated in the semi-finals by eventual winners Collingwood Warriors.

Collingwood Warriors defeated Marconi Fairfield 1–0 in the final to win their first NSL Cup title.

== Teams ==
The NSL Cup was a knockout competition with 16 teams taking part all trying to reach the Final in October 1996. The competition consisted of 13 out of 14 teams from the National Soccer League (with the exclusion of Perth Glory) plus Brisbane Lions and two state representative sides of Northern NSW Soccer Federation and South Australian Soccer Federation.

Round	Main date	Number of fixtures	Clubs remaining
First round	Wednesday 18 September 1996	8	16 → 8
Quarter-finals	Saturday 21 September 1996	4	8 → 4
Semi-finals	Saturday 28 September 1996	2	4 → 2
Final	Sunday 6 October 1996	1	2 → 1

== Bracket ==
Round of 16
Adelaide City	1
West Adelaide	0
South Australian Select XI	1
Collingwood Warriors (a.e.t.)	2
South Melbourne	4
Gippsland Falcons	2
Canberra Cosmos	2
Melbourne Knights	4
Wollongong City	1
Marconi-Fairfield	4
Northern NSW Select XI	2
Newcastle Breakers	12
Sydney United	0
Sydney Olympic	2
Brisbane Strikers (a.e.t.)	2
Brisbane Lions	1

Quarter-finals
Adelaide City	0 (1)
Collingwood Warriors (p)	0 (3)
South Melbourne	1
Melbourne Knights	0
Marconi-Fairfield	3
Newcastle Breakers	1
Sydney Olympic	1
Brisbane Strikers	3

Semi-finals
Collingwood Warriors	3
South Melbourne	1
Marconi-Fairfield	5
Brisbane Strikers	0

Final
Collingwood Warriors	1
Marconi-Fairfield	0

== First round ==
Team 1	Agg.	Team 2	1st leg	2nd leg
Adelaide City	1–0	West Adelaide	0–0	1–0
South Australian Select XI	1–2	Collingwood Warriors	1–0	0–2 (a.e.t.)
South Melbourne	4–2	Gippsland Falcons	1–2	3–0
Canberra Cosmos	2–4	Melbourne Knights	1–2	1–2
Wollongong City	1–4	Marconi-Fairfield	1–0	1–3
Northern NSW Select XI	2–12	Newcastle Breakers	1–7	1–5
Sydney United	0–2	Sydney Olympic	0–1	0–1
Brisbane Strikers	2–1	Brisbane Lions	0–1	2–0 (a.e.t.)

4 September 1996	Wollongong City	0–1	Marconi Fairfield	Wollongong
19:30 AEST		Report	Ravanello ?'	Stadium: Balls Paddock; Referee: Simon Micallef

13–14 September 1996	Marconi Fairfield	3–1	Wollongong City	Sydney
	?', ?', ?'	Report	?'	Stadium: Marconi Stadium

Marconi Fairfield won 4–1 on aggregate

6 September 1996	UTS Olympic	1–0	Sydney United	Sydney
19:30 AEST	Tome 77'	Report		Stadium: Sydney United Sports Centre; Referee: Brett Hugo

10 September 1996	Sydney United	0–1	UTS Olympic	Sydney
		Report	Tome 65'	Stadium: Sydney United Sports Centre; Referee: Simon Micallef

UTS Olympic won 2–0 on aggregate

6 September 1996	South Melbourne	1–2	Gippsland Falcons	Melbourne
19:30 AEST	Spink 22'	Report	Krncevic 20'; Villani 34'	Stadium: Bob Jane Stadium; Referee: Gerry Connolly

13 September 1996	Gippsland Falcons	0–3	South Melbourne	Morwell
19:30 AEST		Report	?', ?', ?'	Stadium: Falcons Park

South Melbourne won 4–2 on aggregate

7 September 1996	Brisbane Strikers	0–1	Brisbane Lions	Brisbane
19:00 AEST		Report	Allen 18'	Stadium: Perry Park; Referee: Daniel Crawford

15 September 1996	Brisbane Lions	0–2 (a.e.t.)	Brisbane Strikers	Brisbane
15:00 AEST		Report	Brown 27'; Hunter 111'	Stadium: Richlands Stadium; Referee: Matthew Shield

Brisbane Strikers won 2–1 on aggregate

7 September 1996	Canberra Cosmos	1–2	Melbourne Knights	Canberra
19:00 AEST	Armstrong 61'	Report	Pondeljak 65'; Markovski 85'	Stadium: Bruce Stadium; Referee: Con Diomis

13 September 1996	Melbourne Knights	2–1	Canberra Cosmos	Melbourne
19:30 AEST	Pondeljak 57'; Markovski 72' (pen.)	Report	Kelly 90' (pen.)	Stadium: Knights Park; Referee: Gerry Connolly

Melbourne Knights won 4–2 on aggregate

12 September 1996	Northern NSW Soccer Federation XI	1–7	Newcastle Breakers	Newcastle
19:00 AEST	Tredinnick 56'	Report	Bennett 3', 70'; Ironside 56'; Sprod 75'; Eldridge 81'; Heath 83', 89'	Stadium: Jack McLaughlin Oval; Referee: G. Leverton

18 September 1996	Newcastle Breakers	5–1	Northern NSW Soccer Federation XI	Newcastle
19:00 AEST	Pryce 12'; Halpin 44'; Ironside 69'; Lowe 73'; McGuire 85'	Report	Bailey 18'	Stadium: Breakers Stadium; Referee: Matthew Breeze

Newcastle Breakers won 12–2 on aggregate

15 September 1996	Adelaide City	0–0	West Adelaide	Adelaide
19:30 ACST		Report		Stadium: Hindmarsh Stadium; Referee: B. Panella

18 September 1996	West Adelaide	0–1	Adelaide City	Adelaide
20:00 ACST		Report	Gibson 37'	Stadium: Hindmarsh Stadium

Adelaide City won 1–0 on aggregate

15 September 1996	Collingwood Warriors	0–1	South Australian Soccer Federation XI	Adelaide
19:30 ACST		Report	Maxwell 17'	Stadium: Hindmarsh Stadium; Referee: Wayne Dade

18 September 1996	South Australian Soccer Federation XI	0–2 (a.e.t.)	Collingwood Warriors	Adelaide
17:30 ACST		Report	Babic 18'; Taliadoros 91'	Stadium: Hindmarsh Stadium

Collingwood Warriors won 2–1 on aggregate

== Quarter-finals ==
20 September 1996	Marconi Fairfield	3–1	Newcastle Breakers	Sydney
	Awaritefe 24', 38'; Maloney 43'	Report	Ironside 76'	Stadium: Marconi Stadium; Referee: G. Leverton

21 September 1996	Brisbane Strikers	3–1	UTS Olympic	Sydney
	Battistin 22'; Brown 38'; Brayshaw 40'	Report	Zelic 74'	Stadium: Marconi Stadium; Referee: Gerry Connolly

21 September 1996	South Melbourne	1–0	Melbourne Knights
	Curcija 12'	Report		Referee: Gerry Connolly

22 September 1996	Adelaide City	0–0 (a.e.t.) (1–3 p)	Collingwood Warriors	Adelaide
		Report		Stadium: Hindmarsh Stadium; Referee: Con Diomis

== Semi-finals ==
27 September 1996	South Melbourne	1–3	Collingwood Warriors	Melbourne
	Spink 47'	Report	Vlahos 25', 74'; Taliadoros 70'	Stadium: Bob Jane Stadium

28 September 1996	Marconi Fairfield	5–0	Brisbane Strikers	Sydney
	Foster 8'; Longo 64'; Awaritefe 68', 86'; Bingley 77'	Report		Stadium: Marconi Stadium; Referee: Eddie Lennie

== Final ==
6 October 1996
15:00 AEST

Collingwood Warriors	1–0	Marconi Fairfield
Boutsianis 46'	Report

Bob Jane Stadium, Melbourne
Attendance: 2,327
Referee: Eddie Lennie
