= 1994 NSL Cup final =

- Event: 1994–95 NSL Cup
| Melbourne Knights | Heidelberg United |
| 6 | 0 |
- Date: 16 October 1994
- Venue: Olympic Park, Melbourne
- Referee: Eugene Brazzale
- Attendance: 4,500
- Weather: Hot; 34 °C (93 °F)

The 1994 NSL Cup final was the final match of the 1994–95 NSL Cup, the 19th season of the National Soccer League Cup. It was played at Olympic Park in Melbourne on 16 October 1994 between Melbourne Knights and Heidelberg United, making it the first time two Melbourne teams was contested in a NSL Cup final. Melbourne Knights won the match 6–0 for their first NSL Cup title.

== Route to the final ==
| Melbourne Knights | | Round | Heidelberg United | |
| Opposition | Score | Round | Opposition | Score |
|---|---|---|---|---|
| Melbourne Zebras | 3–2 (agg.) | R1 | Marconi Fairfield | 2–0 (agg.) |
| New South Wales U-23 (H) | 3–2 | QF | Brisbane Strikers (H) | 5–0 |
| South Melbourne (A) | 2–1 | SF | Sydney Olympic (A) | 3–2 |
Key: (H) = Home venue; (A) = Away venue

== Match ==
=== Details ===
16 October 1994

| Melbourne Knights | 6–0 | Heidelberg United |
|---|---|---|
| Spiteri 30', 70'; Horvat 51'; Biskic 80'; Viduka 86', 87' | Report |

Olympic Park, Melbourne
Attendance: 4,500
Referee: Eugene Brazzale

| GK | (Australia) Frank Juric |
| DF | (Australia) Steve Horvat |
| DF | (Australia) Zoran Markovski |
| DF | (Australia) David Cervinski |
| DF | (Australia) Vinko Buljubasic | | (substituted off) 41' |
| MF | (Australia) Mark Silic | | (substituted off) 87' |
| MF | (Croatia) Josip Biskic |
| MF | (Slovakia) Lubo Lapsansky | Yellow card |
| MF | (Australia) Danny Tiatto |
| FW | (Australia) Joe Spiteri |
| FW | (Australia) Mark Viduka |
Substitutes:
| DF | (Australia) Ante Kovacevic | | (substituted on) 41' |
| MF | (Australia) Damien Vojtek | | (substituted on) 87' |
Head Coach:
(Croatia) Mirko Bazić

| GK | (Australia) David Miller |
| DF | (Australia) Angelo Koutos |
| DF | (Australia) George Georgiadis |
| DF | (Australia) Richard Watson | Yellow card |
| MF | (Australia) Alan Scott |
| MF | (Australia) Walter Ardone |
| FW | (Australia) Peter Tsolakis |
| MF | (Australia) Tom Karapatsos |
| MF | (Australia) Eric Vasiliadis | | (substituted off) 46' |
| FW | (Australia) Michael Michalakopoulos |
| FW | (Australia) Andrew Vlahos | | (substituted off) 71' |
Substitutes:
| MF | (Australia) Steve Iosifids | | (substituted on) 71' |
| FW | (Australia) Danny Gnjidic | Yellow card | (substituted on) 46' |
Head Coach:
(Australia) Michael Urukalo

Match rules

- 90 minutes
- 30 minutes of extra time if necessary
- Penalty shoot-out if scores still level
