= 1996 NSL Cup final (January) =

- Event: 1995–96 NSL Cup
South Melbourne	Newcastle Breakers
3	1
- Date: 27 January 1996
- Venue: Bob Jane Stadium, Melbourne
- Referee: Simon Micallef
- Attendance: 5,000

The 1996 NSL Cup final (January) was the final match of the 1995–96 NSL Cup, the 20th season of the National Soccer League Cup. It was played at Bob Jane Stadium in Melbourne on 27 January 1996 between South Melbourne and Newcastle Breakers. South Melbourne won the match 3–1 for their second NSL Cup title.

== Route to the final ==
South Melbourne		Round	Newcastle Breakers	
Opposition	Score	Round	Opposition	Score
Melbourne Knights	4–3 (agg.)	R1	Brisbane Strikers	2–1 (agg.)
Marconi Fairfield (H)	3–2	QF	Sydney Olympic (H)	3–1
Canberra Cosmos (H)	3–1	SF	Adelaide City (H)	3–1
Key: (H) = Home venue; (A) = Away venue

== Match ==
=== Details ===
27 January 1996

South Melbourne	3–1	Newcastle Breakers
Coveny 22', 74'; Panopoulos 35' (pen.)	Report	Hickman 49'

Bob Jane Stadium, Melbourne
Attendance: 5,000
Referee: Simon Micallef

GK	—	(Australia) Michael Petkovic
DF	2	(Australia) Con Blatsis		(substituted off) 70'
DF	4	(Australia) Alex Kuzmanovic
DF	—	(Australia) Jean-Paul Knezevic
MF	16	(Australia) Tansel Başer	Yellow card
MF	7	(Australia) Steve Panopoulos
MF	12	(Australia) Bill Damianos		(substituted off) 77'
MF	14	(Australia) Mike Petersen
FW	8	(New Zealand) Vaughan Coveny
FW	9	(Australia) Paul Trimboli
FW	19	(Australia) Danny Allsopp		(substituted off) 70'
Substitutes:
DF	6	(Australia) Con Anthopoulos	Yellow card	(substituted on) 70'
MF	17	(Australia) Sasa Nikolic		(substituted on) 77'
FW	13	(Australia) Craig Lewis		(substituted on) 70'
Head Coach:
(Australia) Frank Arok

GK	1	(Australia) Craig Carter	Yellow card
DF	3	(Australia) Steve Hickman
DF	12	(Australia) Glenn Moore	(red card) 90'
DF	16	(Australia) Shane Pryce
DF	—	(Australia) Darren Stewart
MF	9	(Australia) Troy Halpin		(substituted off) 80'
MF	15	(Australia) Scott Thomas	Yellow card
MF	—	(Australia) Glenn Sprod	(red card) 90'
MF	—	(Australia) Peter Ritchie		(substituted off) 51'
FW	13	(Australia) Harry James
FW	—	(Australia) Jason Bennett
Substitutes:
DF	4	(Australia) Ralph Maier		(substituted on) 51'
FW	10	(Australia) Clayton Zane		(substituted on) 80'
Head Coach:
(Australia) John Kosmina

Match rules

- 90 minutes
- 30 minutes of extra time if necessary
- Penalty shoot-out if scores still level
