= Frank Juric =

Australian soccer player and coach

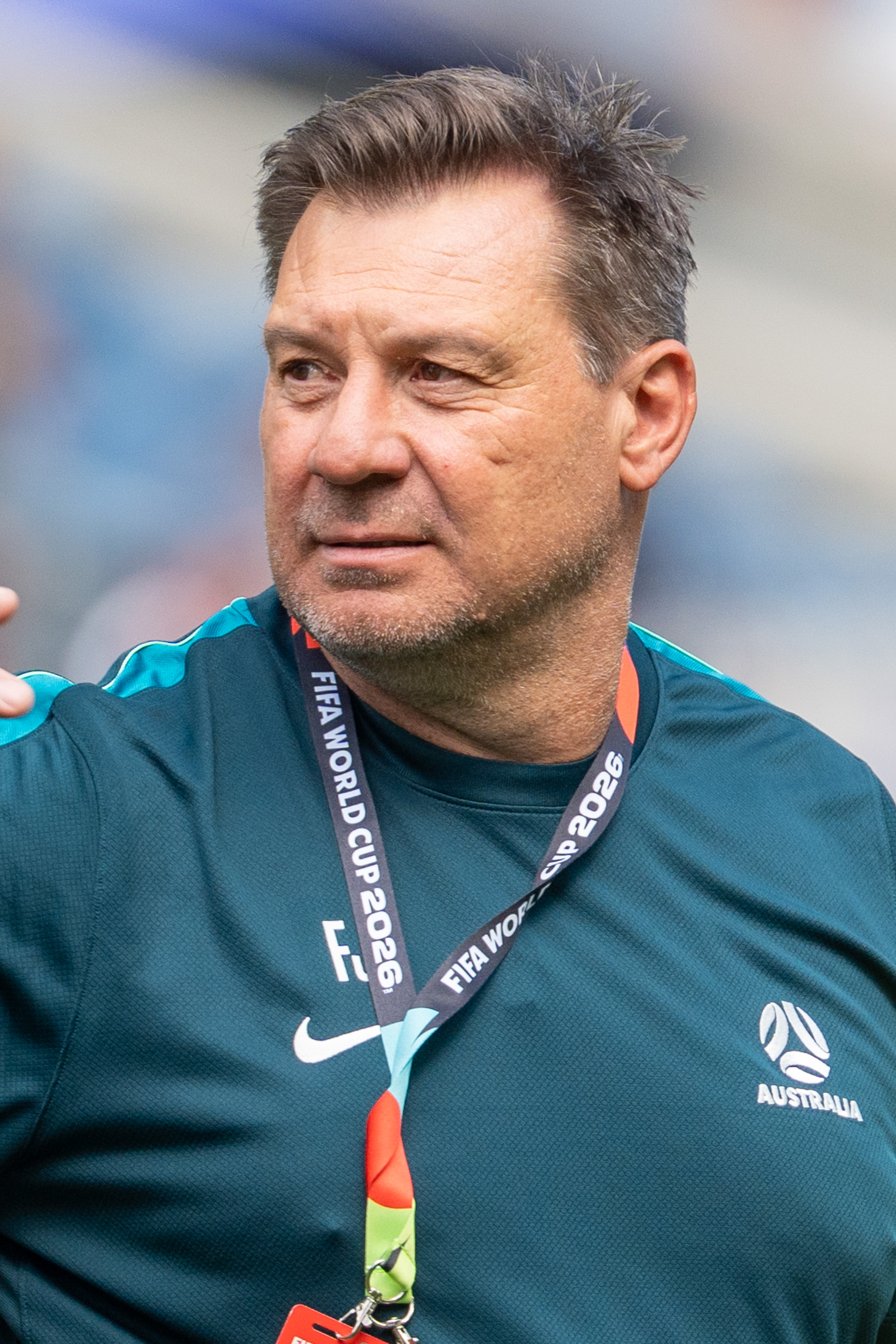
- Juric in 2026

Personal information
- Full name: Frank Juric
- Date of birth: 28 October 1973 (age 53)
- Place of birth: Melbourne, Australia
- Height: 1.95 m (6 ft 5 in)
- Position: Goalkeeper

Team information
- Current team: Australia (goalkeeper coach)

Youth career
- Melbourne Knights
- 1990–1991: AIS

Senior career*
Years	Team	Apps	(Gls)
1992–1996	Melbourne Knights	68	(0)
1996–1997	Collingwood Warriors	25	(0)
1997–1999	Fortuna Düsseldorf	36	(0)
1999–2004	Bayer Leverkusen	11	(0)
2001–2004	Bayer Leverkusen II	17	(0)
2004–2008	Hannover 96	1	(0)
2008–2009	Perth Glory	4	(0)
Total		162	(0)

International career
1993	Australia U-20		
1994–1996	Australia U-23	15	(0)
1995–2001	Australia	2	(0)
Medal record
Men's association football
Representing Australia
FIFA Confederations Cup
Third place	2001 Japan–South Korea
OFC Nations Cup
Winner	1996 Oceania
- * Club domestic league appearances and goals

Frank Juric (Croatian: Frank Jurić, pronounced [jǔːritɕ]; born 28 October 1973) is an Australian former soccer player who played as a goalkeeper.

== Early life ==
Juric was born on 28 October 1973 in Melbourne, Australia. He moved to Canberra, Australia at the age of sixteen.

== Club career ==
Juric began his professional career in the former Australian national league with Melbourne Knights, where he won two league titles, before moving to the newly formed Collingwood Warriors (also based in Melbourne). The club struggled financially though and was unable to go on beyond this solitary season, in which they finished second bottom.

The goalkeeper took this as his cue to move to Europe, although the transfer was a protracted affair, as Collingwood Warriors – no longer technically in existence – still demanded a fee from Fortuna Düsseldorf. Eventually, this was resolved by the German club paying $30,000 and Juric was free to move for the 1997–98 season.

His first season in Germany was relatively successful as Fortuna Düsseldorf finished seventh in the 2. Bundesliga. However, the following year they suffered relegation to the Regionalliga-West. However, Juric had been spotted by Bundesliga team Bayer 04 Leverkusen and he signed for the high-flying club in summer 1999.

Juric was used as a backup keeper here, behind the likes of Adam Matysek and Hans-Jörg Butt but still managed 11 Bundesliga appearances as the club enjoyed a series of strong performances both domestically, and notably in the 2002 Champions League, where they reached the final. Juric himself appeared twice in the UEFA Champions League in 2002–03, against Olympiacos and Manchester United.

In June 2004, he joined fellow Bundesliga side Hannover 96 as second choice keeper behind Robert Enke. His time with the Reds has been blighted by persistent knee problems, limiting to just a single appearance in his first three seasons there, playing in a 2–2 draw with Borussia Mönchengladbach on 6 May 2006.

In May 2008, it was announced that Juric was to return to his native Australia for the 2008–09 A-League season, with Perth Glory. He competed for the number one jersey alongside Olyroo Tando Velaphi, while Jason Petkovic was retained as a backup and advisor to the youth team. Juric's poor run of form led to the goalkeeping position given to Tando Velaphi.

In May 2009, Juric retired as a player and joined Glory as goalkeeping coach, when they signed Aleks Vrteski as the club's second goalkeeper.

== International career ==
Juric made two full appearances for the Australian national team, making his debut on 10 November 1995 in a 1996 OFC Nations Cup match against New Zealand which finished goalless, and also appearing on 10 February 1996 in a 1–4 friendly defeat to Japan.

He also competed in the 1996 Olympics in the football competition and was an unused squad member in the 2001 FIFA Confederations Cup, where they achieved third place. However, the likes of Mark Schwarzer, Zeljko Kalac and Mark Bosnich had severely limited his hopes of international football.

== Managerial career ==
Following coaching stints at Melbourne Knights FC, Adelaide United, Western United and Brisbane Roar, Football Australia announced that Juric would succeed John Crawley as the Socceroos' goalkeeper coach. While working for Australian side Adelaide United, he coached Australia international Paul Izzo.

== Career statistics ==
Appearances and goals by club, season and competition
Club	Season	League			Cup		League cup		Continental		Total	
Club	Season	Division	Apps	Goals	Apps	Goals	Apps	Goals	Apps	Goals	Apps	Goals
Melbourne Knights	1992–93	National Soccer League	3	0	0	0	—		—		3	0
Melbourne Knights	1993–94	National Soccer League	5	0	0	0	—		—		5	0
Melbourne Knights	1994–95	National Soccer League	27	0	5	0	—		—		32	0
Melbourne Knights	1995–96	National Soccer League	33	0	0	0	—		—		33	0
Melbourne Knights	Total		68	0	5	0	—		—		73	0
Collingwood Warriors	1996–97	National Soccer League	25	0	0	0	—		—		25	0
Fortuna Düsseldorf	1997–98	2. Bundesliga	7	0	0	0	—		—		7	0
Fortuna Düsseldorf	1998–99	2. Bundesliga	29	0	2	0	—		—		31	0
Fortuna Düsseldorf	Total		36	0	2	0	—		—		38	0
Bayer 04 Leverkusen	1999–2000	Bundesliga	4	0	0	0	0	0	0	0	4	0
Bayer 04 Leverkusen	2000–01	Bundesliga	6	0	0	0	0	0	0	0	6	0
Bayer 04 Leverkusen	2001–02	Bundesliga	0	0	0	0	0	0	0	0	0	0
Bayer 04 Leverkusen	2002–03	Bundesliga	1	0	1	0	2	0	2	0	6	0
Bayer 04 Leverkusen	Total		11	0	1	0	2	0	2	0	16	0
Bayer 04 Leverkusen II	2001–02	Regionalliga Nord	6	0	—		—		—		6	0
Bayer 04 Leverkusen II	2002–03	Regionalliga Nord	1	0	—		—		—		1	0
Bayer 04 Leverkusen II	2003–04	Oberliga Nordrhein	10	0	—		—		—		10	0
Bayer 04 Leverkusen II	Total		17	0	—		—		—		17	0
Hannover 96	2004–05	Bundesliga	0	0	0	0	—		—		0	0
Hannover 96	2005–06	Bundesliga	1	0	0	0	—		—		1	0
Hannover 96	2006–07	Bundesliga	0	0	0	0	—		—		0	0
Hannover 96	2007–08	Bundesliga	0	0	0	0	—		—		0	0
Hannover 96	Total		1	0	0	0	—		—		1	0
Perth Glory	2008–09	A-League	4	0	2	0	—		—		6	0
Career total			162	0	10	0	2	0	2	0	176	0

== Honours ==
Melbourne Knights

- NSL: 1994–95, 1995–96
- NSL Premiers: 1991–92, 1993–94, 1994–95

Bayer Leverkusen

- Bundesliga: Runner-up 1999–2000 and 2001–02
- DFB-Pokal: Runner-up 2001–02
- UEFA Champions League Runner-up: 2001–02

Australia

- FIFA Confederations Cup: 3rd place, 2001
- OFC Nations Cup: 1996
