= 1994–95 National Soccer League =

Australian soccer season

NSL 1994-95
- League: National Soccer League
- Sport: Association football
- Duration: 1994–95
- Teams: 13

NSL season
- Champions: Melbourne Knights
- Minor premier: Melbourne Knights
- Top scorer: Mark Viduka (18)

National Soccer League seasons
- ← 1993–94 1995–96 →

The 1994–95 National Soccer League season, was the 19th season of the National Soccer League in Australia. The season ended with Melbourne Knights winning the championship and minor premiership double.

== Changes from 1993–94 ==
In August 1994 the Australian Soccer Federation (ASF) announced to mixed reaction that all regular season league matches would be decided by penalty shootout if the game was drawn at the end of 90 minutes of play. Four points were awarded for a win, two for a win on penalties, one for a penalty loss and no points for a loss in regulation time.

== Teams ==
Prior to the start of the season, the Newcastle Breakers withdrew from the competition citing financial difficulties. The withdrawal of the Breakers left 13 teams, meaning each team had two byes for the season.

Location of teams in 1994–95 National Soccer League

Team	Home city	Home ground
Adelaide City	Adelaide	Hindmarsh Stadium
Brisbane Strikers	Brisbane	Perry Park
Heidelberg United	Melbourne	Olympic Village
Morwell Falcons	Morwell	Falcons Park
Marconi-Fairfield	Sydney	Marconi Stadium
Melbourne Knights	Melbourne	Knights Stadium
Melbourne SC	Melbourne	Olympic Park
Parramatta Eagles	Sydney	Melita Stadium
South Melbourne	Melbourne	Middle Park; Lakeside Stadium
Sydney Olympic	Sydney	Leichhardt Oval; Belmore Oval
Sydney United	Sydney	Edensor Park
West Adelaide	Adelaide	Hindmarsh Stadium
Wollongong City	Wollongong	Brandon Park

== Regular season ==
=== League table ===
Pos	Team	Pld	W	PW	PL	L	GF	GA	GD	Pts	Qualification
1	Melbourne Knights (C)	24	16	2	2	4	56	25	+31	70	Qualification for the Finals series
2	Adelaide City	24	16	1	3	4	41	20	+21	69	Qualification for the Finals series
3	Sydney United	24	15	3	2	4	34	19	+15	68	Qualification for the Finals series
4	Morwell Falcons	24	8	4	7	5	41	37	+4	47	Qualification for the Finals series
5	West Adelaide	24	8	5	3	8	28	32	−4	45	Qualification for the Finals series
6	South Melbourne	24	9	3	2	10	42	36	+6	44	Qualification for the Finals series
7	Brisbane Strikers	24	8	3	3	10	34	32	+2	41	
8	Wollongong City	24	8	2	2	12	39	46	−7	38	
9	Sydney Olympic	24	8	1	3	12	27	34	−7	37	
10	Marconi-Fairfield	24	6	4	3	11	34	43	−9	35	
11	Melbourne SC	24	6	4	2	12	20	37	−17	34	
12	Parramatta Eagles	24	7	2	1	14	25	34	−9	33	
13	Heidelberg United	24	6	1	2	15	27	53	−26	28	

Updated to match(es) played on unknown. Source: rsssf.com
Rules for classification: 1) points; 2) goal difference; 3) number of goals scored.
(C) Champion

== Finals series ==
Elimination finals
3	Sydney United	1	1	(2)
5	West Adelaide	0	1	(1)
4	Morwell Falcons	0	1	(1)
6	South Melbourne	1	5	(6)

Semifinals
1	Melbourne Knights	0	1	(1)
2	Adelaide City	1	2	(3)
Sydney United	1
South Melbourne	3

Preliminary final
Melbourne Knights	3
South Melbourne	2

Grand final
Adelaide City	0
Melbourne Knights	2

== Individual awards ==
- Player of the Year: Mark Viduka (Melbourne Knights)
- U-21 Player of the Year: Mark Viduka (Melbourne Knights)
- Top Scorer: Mark Viduka (Melbourne Knights) – 18 goals
- Coach of the Year: Zoran Matic (Adelaide City)
