= Ernie Tapai =

Australian soccer player (born 1967)

Personal information
- Full name: Ernest Tapai
- Date of birth: 14 February 1967 (age 59)
- Place of birth: Subotica, Yugoslavia
- Height: 1.68 m (5 ft 6 in)
- Position: Midfielder

Senior career*
Years	Team	Apps	(Gls)
1985–1989	Footscray JUST	100	(10)
1989–1990	Sunshine George Cross	15	(0)
1990–1992	Adelaide City	35	(6)
1992–1993	Stoke City	0	(0)
1993–1994	Estoril	13	(1)
1994–1996	Morwell Falcons	48	(8)
1996–1997	Collingwood Warriors	24	(1)
1997–1998	Perth Glory	15	(2)
1999–2000	Home United	?	(?)
2001	Clementi Khalsa	16	(3)
2002	Westgate		
Total		266	(31)

International career
1990–1998	Australia	37	(6)

Managerial career
- 2007: Corio
Medal record
Representing Australia
Men's Association football
FIFA Confederations Cup
Runner-up	1997 Saudi Arabia
OFC Nations Cup
Winner	1996 Oceania
Runner-up	1998 Australia
- * Club domestic league appearances and goals

Ernie Tapai (born 14 February 1967) is an Australian former professional soccer player who spent the majority of his career in the Australian National Soccer League (NSL). He also had stints in England, Portugal and Singapore. Tapai played 52 times for Australia, including 37 times in full international matches.

== Early life ==
Tapai was born in Subotica, Yugoslavia (now in Serbia). He migrated to Australia with his parents as a young child.

== Club career ==
After playing as a junior for Melbourne Hungaria, Tapai signed for Footscray JUST ahead of the 1985 National Soccer League season. He made at age 18 in the National Soccer League. After playing with Sunshine George Cross and Adelaide City Tapai moved to Europe to play for English side Stoke City.Stoke City. He never got much of a chance at Stoke making just once appearance for the club which came as a substitute in a 2–2 draw with Crewe Alexandra in the Football League Trophy on 6 January 1993.

Tapai then signed with Portuguese club Estoril, participating in the 1993–94 Primeira Divisão season, where he scored his only goal against Benfica, but moved back to play in Australia. He went on to play for Gippsland Falcons and Perth Glory before playing for three years in Singapore with Home United and Clementi Khalsa and retired after the 2002 season with Westgate.

After ending his playing career Tapai went into coaching.

== International career ==
Tapai played 52 games (37 'A' games) for the Australia national team between 1986 and 1998. He was part of the Australia squad that claimed 2nd place at the 1997 FIFA Confederations Cup. Australian manager Terry Venables received criticism for bringing on Tapai in the 1997 World Cup Qualifier against Iran. Australia needed a goal and Tapai was not the man many viewed as being a viable attacking option.

Tapai was an Australian schoolboys representative, earning selection in 1984.

== Career statistics ==
=== Club ===
Appearances and goals by club, season and competition
Club	Season	League			National cup		League cup		Other		Total	
Club	Season	Division	Apps	Goals	Apps	Goals	Apps	Goals	Apps	Goals	Apps	Goals
Footscray JUST	1985	National Soccer League	22	3	—		—		—		22	3
Footscray JUST	1986	National Soccer League	26	4	—		—		—		26	4
Footscray JUST	1987	National Soccer League	21	2	—		—		—		21	2
Footscray JUST	1988	National Soccer League	17	0	—		—		—		17	0
Footscray JUST	1989	National Soccer League	14	0	—		—		—		14	0
Footscray JUST	Total		100	10	—		—		—		100	10
Sunshine George Cross	1989–90	National Soccer League	15	0	—		—		—		15	0
Adelaide City	1990–91	National Soccer League	9	4	—		—		—		9	4
Adelaide City	1991–92	National Soccer League	26	2	—		—		—		26	2
Adelaide City	Total		35	6	—		—		—		35	6
Stoke City	1992–93	Second Division	0	0	0	0	0	0	1	0	1	0
Estoril	1993–94	Primeira Divisão	13	1	—		—		—		13	1
Gippsland Falcons	1994–95	National Soccer League	20	5	—		—		—		20	5
Gippsland Falcons	1995–96	National Soccer League	28	3	—		—		—		28	3
Gippsland Falcons	Total		48	8	—		—		—		48	8
Collingwood Warriors	1996–97	National Soccer League	24	1	—		—		—		24	1
Perth Glory	1997–98	National Soccer League	15	2	—		—		—		15	2
Career total			250	28	0	0	0	0	1	0	251	28

=== International ===
Appearances and goals by national team and year
National team	Year	Apps	Goals
Australia	1990	3	0
Australia	1991	2	0
Australia	1992	11	1
Australia	1996	6	1
Australia	1997	10	3
Australia	1998	4	1
Total		36	6

Scores and results list Australia's goal tally first, score column indicates score after each Tapai goal.

List of international goals scored by Ernie Tapai
No.	Date	Venue	Opponent	Score	Result	Competition
1	8 July 1992	Hindmarsh Stadium, Adelaide, Australia	Croatia	1–0	3–1	Friendly
2	27 October 1996	Olympic Stadium, Papeete, Tahiti	Tahiti	1–0	6–0	1996 OFC Nations Cup
3	11 June 1997	Parramatta Stadium, Sydney, Australia	Solomon Islands	8–0	13–0	1998 FIFA World Cup qualification
4	17 June 1997	Parramatta Stadium, Sydney, Australia	Solomon Islands	4–0	6–2	1998 FIFA World Cup qualification
5	17 June 1997	Parramatta Stadium, Sydney, Australia	Solomon Islands	5–0	6–2	1998 FIFA World Cup qualification
6	11 February 1998	Sydney Football Stadium, Sydney, Australia	South Korea	1–0	1–0	Friendly

== Honours ==
Australia

- FIFA Confederations Cup: runner-up, 1997
- OFC Nations Cup: 1996; runner-up, 1998
