= Goran Lozanovski =

Australian soccer player and manager

Personal information
- Full name: Goran Lozanovski
- Date of birth: 11 January 1974 (age 52)
- Place of birth: Melbourne, Australia
- Position: Midfielder

Team information
- Current team: Altona Magic (Head Coach)

Youth career
- Altona Magic
- 1990–1991: AIS

Senior career*
Years	Team	Apps	(Gls)
1991–1993	Preston Makedonia	18	(1)
1993–1996	Adelaide City	86	(7)
1996–1997	Collingwood Warriors	17	(0)
1997–2001	South Melbourne	97	(15)
2001–2002	Alemannia Aachen	12	(0)
2002–2003	Adelaide City	29	(4)
2003–2004	Adelaide United	14	(0)
2004	Western Strikers	12	(6)
2005	Heidelberg United	8	(0)
2005–2008	Preston Lions	2	(0)

International career
1993	Australia U20		
1996	Australia U23		
1996–1998	Australia	9	(0)

Managerial career
- 2007–2008: Preston Lions
- 2008–2009: Hume City FC
- 2010–2011: Bentleigh Greens
- 2011–2012: Northcote City FC (Asst.)
- 2012–2015: Northcote City FC
- 2016: Port Melbourne SC (Asst.)
- 2017–2020: Altona Magic
- 2021–2022: Westgate FC
- 2022: Hume City
- 2023: Sydenham Park
- 2024–: Altona Magic
Medal record
Representing Australia
Men's Association football
OFC Nations Cup
Runner-up	1998 Australia
- * Club domestic league appearances and goals as of 12 May 2007

Goran Lozanovski (born 11 January 1974) is a former Australian soccer player and current manager holding the role of senior coach at Altona Magic.

== Playing career ==
=== Club ===
Noted for his ability at taking set pieces, began his National Soccer League career with Preston Lions, before joining Adelaide City where he was a part of that club's championship winning team in the 1993/94 season.

Later joining Collingwood Warriors, after that club's dissolution, Lozanovski signed with South Melbourne in 1997 under Ange Postecoglou, where he would go on to win 2 grand finals in both the 1997–1998, and 1998–1999 seasons. In the 1999 Grand Final against Sydney United, Lozanovski was awarded the prestigious Joe Marston Medal in South Melbourne's 3–2 victory.

Lozanovski's success at South Melbourne paved the way for him to link up with fellow Australian Mark Rudan at then-2. Bundesliga club Alemannia Aachen. However, his stay at the club would last only 12 games after being embroiled in the 'suitcase affair' corruption scandal in 2001, after financial irregularities arose following both Australian players transfers to the club. After Rudan was briefly arrested by German authorities over the scandal, charges were laid on the clubs treasurer Bernd Krings, who was convicted of financial fraud. Both Lozanovski and Rudan were eventually cleared, with both players departing the club shortly after.

Returning home, Lozanovski had stints in South Australia with Adelaide City, Adelaide United, and Western Strikers during the dying years of the National Soccer League. He saw out his career in the Victorian State Leagues with Heidelberg United and Preston Lions respectively, where he retired in 2008.

=== Managerial ===
Following his retirement, Lozanovski immediately took up a head coaching position at Preston Lions. He would go on to briefly coach both Hume City, and his 2013 Grand Final opponents, Bentleigh Greens before joining Northcote City. During the 2012 season at Northcote, Lozanovski was promoted to head coach, following Peter Tsolakis' departure to South Melbourne.

In 2013, Lozanovski took Northcote FC to their first ever Victorian Premier League Championship, defeating Bentleigh Greens in which would be the last season of the Victorian Premier League system, before it was re-branded into the National Premier Leagues Victoria. Lozanovski decided to resign as Manager at Northcote following the 2015 season and joined Port Melbourne SC as an Assistant Manager ahead of the 2016 season.

In 2023, Lozanovski return to Altona Magic for second time as manager. Lozanovski said he was "excited and proud" to be back at the Magic. It is great to be back at my home club, and it felt exciting to be walking back through the front gate, he said. I have some unfinished business at Magic and I have already hit the ground running in preparation for 2024.

== Honours ==
=== Player ===
Adelaide City

- National Soccer League Championship 1993-1994

South Melbourne FC

- National Soccer League Premiership: 1997-1998
- National Soccer League Championship: 1997-1998, 1998-1999
- Joe Marston Medal: 1999

Australia

- OFC Nations Cup: runner-up 1998

=== Manager ===
Preston Lions FC

- Victorian Premier League Premiership: 2007
- Victorian Premier League Championship:2007

Northcote City FC|Northcote FC

- Victorian Premier League Premiership: 2013
- Victorian Premier League Championship: 2013
