= 2013 Victorian Premier League =

Victorian Premier League
- Season: 2013
- Teams: 12
- Champions: Northcote City
- Premiers: Northcote City
- Relegated: Richmond; Southern Stars

The 2013 Victorian Premier League was the one-hundred first season of the top tier of club football in Victoria. The home and away season commenced on 6 April 2013. Dandenong Thunder were the defending champions.

== Match-fixing scandal ==
On 15 September 2013, Victoria Police arrested ten people at the Southern Stars, including players David Obaze, Nick McKoy and Joe Woolley, and head coach Zaya Younan.

Later in September, criminal charges were laid by the Victoria Police: the FFA handed Noel, Woolley, Obaze, McKoy and coach Younan initial suspensions which prevented them from being involved in any football-related activity in Australia while the investigation was ongoing. Those bans were also extended worldwide by FIFA. Two British footballers, Reiss Noel and Joe Woolley, received lifetime bans from FIFA for their role in the incident.

Gerry Subramaniam, a Malaysian national and the Australian ring-leader of the betting syndicate behind the match fixing, was sentenced to three years jail in Australia, to be followed by deportation to Malaysia.

The Southern Stars were later suspended from the competition, and all 22 of their matches were declared a No Result, being recorded as 0–0 draws with zero points awarded: this ruling effectively deleted the club from the calculations of the final ladder.

However, the Bentleigh Greens had originally forfeited their Round 22 match against Southern Stars due to a lack of players: as a result of the above ruling, Bentleigh were awarded one point for the match and had a previously imposed fine of $900 for the forfeit refunded.

== VPL Teams ==
| Team | Home city | Home ground |
|---|---|---|
| Bentleigh Greens | Cheltenham, Melbourne | Kingston Heath Soccer Complex |
| Dandenong Thunder | Dandenong, Melbourne | George Andrews Reserve |
| Green Gully | Keilor, Melbourne | Green Gully Reserve |
| Southern Stars FC | Dingley, Melbourne | Kingston Heath Soccer Complex |
| Hume City | City of Hume, Melbourne | John Ilhan Memorial Reserve |
| Melbourne Knights | Sunshine North, Melbourne | Knights Stadium |
| Northcote City | Thornbury, Melbourne | John Cain Memorial Park |
| Oakleigh Cannons | Oakleigh, Melbourne | Jack Edwards Reserve |
| Richmond SC | Richmond, Melbourne | Kevin Bartlett Reserve |
| South Melbourne FC | Albert Park, Melbourne | Lakeside Stadium |
| Pascoe Vale | Coburg North, Melbourne | CB Smith Reserve |
| Port Melbourne | Port Melbourne, Melbourne | SS Anderson Reserve |

== Promotion and relegation ==
Teams promoted from Victorian State League Division 1:
(After the end of the 2012 season.)

- Pascoe Vale (champions)
- Port Melbourne (runners-up)

Teams relegated to Victorian State League Division 1:
(After the end of the 2012 season.)

- Moreland Zebras (11th)
- Heidelberg United (12th)

== Regular season ==
The Victorian Premier League 2013 season was played over 22 rounds, beginning on 23 March and concluding on 16 September 2013, followed by the final series.

| Pos | Team | Pld | W | D | L | GF | GA | GD | Pts | Qualification or relegation |
|---|---|---|---|---|---|---|---|---|---|---|
| 1 | Northcote City (C) | 22 | 13 | 7 | 2 | 50 | 18 | +32 | 46 | VPL 2013 Victorian Premier League Finals |
| 2 | Melbourne Knights | 22 | 11 | 6 | 5 | 31 | 26 | +5 | 39 | VPL 2013 Victorian Premier League Finals |
| 3 | Bentleigh Greens | 22 | 9 | 9 | 4 | 39 | 24 | +15 | 36 | VPL 2013 Victorian Premier League Finals |
| 4 | South Melbourne | 22 | 9 | 6 | 7 | 40 | 33 | +7 | 33 | VPL 2013 Victorian Premier League Finals |
| 5 | Green Gully Cavaliers | 22 | 9 | 6 | 7 | 32 | 28 | +4 | 33 | VPL 2013 Victorian Premier League Finals |
| 6 | Port Melbourne Sharks | 22 | 9 | 5 | 8 | 24 | 28 | −4 | 32 | |
| 7 | Dandenong Thunder | 22 | 8 | 4 | 10 | 28 | 30 | −2 | 28 | |
| 8 | Oakleigh Cannons | 22 | 7 | 4 | 11 | 33 | 37 | −4 | 25 | |
| 9 | Hume City | 22 | 7 | 4 | 11 | 26 | 46 | −20 | 25 | |
| 10 | Pascoe Vale | 22 | 4 | 8 | 10 | 21 | 30 | −9 | 20 | |
| 11 | Richmond | 22 | 2 | 7 | 13 | 24 | 48 | −24 | 13 | Relegation to Victorian State League Division 1 |
| 12 | Southern Stars | 0 | 0 | 0 | 0 | 0 | 0 | 0 | 0 | Relegation to Victorian State League Division 1 |

Rules for classification: 1) points; 2) goal difference; 3) number of goals scored.
(C) Champions

== Finals ==
Qualifying/Elimination Finals
2 | Melbourne Knights | 2
3 | Bentleigh Greens | 4
4 | South Melbourne | 1
5 | Green Gully Cavaliers | 0

Semi Final
1 | Northcote City | 1
Bentleigh Greens | 2
Melbourne Knights | 0
South Melbourne | 1

Preliminary Final
Northcote City | 5
South Melbourne | 0

Grand Final
Bentleigh Greens | 1 (2)
Northcote City | 1 (3)

=== Finals Week 1 ===
| 29 September 2013 Elimination Final | South Melbourne | 1–0 | Green Gully Cavaliers | Lakeside Stadium, Albert Park |
| 5:00PM | Holmes 90' | | | Referee: Perry Mur |

| 29 September 2013 Qualifying Final | Melbourne Knights | 2–4 | Bentleigh Greens | Knights Stadium, Sunshine North |
| 3:00PM | Barisic 45' (pen.); Talajic 61' | | Sherbon 31', 39', 70'; Stirton 51' |

=== Finals Week 2 ===
| 4 October 2013 Major Semi Final | Northcote City | 1–2 (a.e.t.) | Bentleigh Greens | SS Anderson Reserve, City of Port Phillip |
| 6:00PM | Kalifatidis 83' | | De Vries 79', 102' |

| 4 October 2013 Minor Semi Final | Melbourne Knights | 0–1 | South Melbourne | Knights Stadium, Sunshine North |
| 7:30PM | | | Rixon 67' | Referee: Lewis Guiseffi |

=== Finals Week 3 ===
| 13 October 2013 Preliminary Final | Northcote City | 5–0 | South Melbourne | SS Anderson Reserve, City of Port Phillip |
| 3:00PM | Kalifatidis 5'; Gavalas 31' (o.g.); Lujic 55', 78'; Kounavelis 60' | | | Referee: Shaun Evans |

=== Grand Final ===
19 October 2013
1:00 PM

| Bentleigh Greens | 2–3 (a.e.t.) | Northcote City |
|---|---|---|
| De Vries 88'; Sherbon 93' | Report | Kounavelis 63'; Lujic 104'; Gasparis 108' |

AAMI Park, Melbourne
Referee: Lucien Laverdure

== Top goalscorers ==
| Pos | Player | Club | Goals |
|---|---|---|---|
| 1 | Milos Lujic | Northcote City | 19 |
| 2 | Luke Flynn | Bentleigh Greens | 15 |
| 3 | Dusan Bosnjak | Oakleigh Cannons | 13 |
| 4 | Luke Hopper | South Melbourne | 10 |
| 5 | Thomas Cahill | Richmond SC | 9 |

== See also ==
- Victorian Premier League
- Football Federation Victoria
- National Premier Leagues Victoria
