= Peter Ritchie =

Canadian lawyer

Peter Ritchie is a Canadian lawyer. He is well known as the defense counsel for accused serial killer Robert Pickton. He is also known for representing Doukhobors who stripped naked in court to defend their religious freedom as well as Gillian Guess, who was charged with obstruction of justice for having an affair with an accused in a criminal trial while serving on the jury.
