= Zoran Matić =

Serbian former football coach (born 1944)

Zoran Matić OAM
Personal information
- Full name: Zoran Matić
- Date of birth: 25 December 1944 (age 81)
- Place of birth: Yugoslavia
- Position: Defender

Senior career*
Years	Team	Apps	(Gls)
1973–????	Beograd Woodville		
1977–1978	Adelaide City	38	(1)

Managerial career
- 1986–1995: Adelaide City
- 1996–1997: Collingwood Warriors
- 1997–1998: Marconi FC
- 1998–2002: Adelaide City
- 2002–2003: Adelaide City
- * Club domestic league appearances and goals

Zoran Matić OAM (Serbian pronunciation: [zǒran mǎːtit͡ɕ]; born 25 December 1944) is a Serbian former footballer and coach.

== Biography ==
=== Playing career ===
After arriving in Adelaide 1973 from Yugoslavia Matić played for Beograd Woodville (White City) before moving to Adelaide City. While playing for Adelaide City he represented the State of South Australia four times.

=== Coaching career ===
Matić is best known for coaching Adelaide City in the Australian National Soccer League. He coached Adelaide City to three championships (1986, 1991/1992 and 1993/1994) and was the first NSL coach to have won 200 matches. Matić was NSL coach of the year for the 1990/1991 and 1994/1995 seasons. Matić is a member of the Football Federation Australia Football Hall of Fame and the Football Federation of South Australia Hall of Fame.

=== Retirement ===
After retiring from coaching, Matić began working in the construction industry. In 2006, as a result of an industrial accident, involving a six-metre fall from a roof, Matić was hospitalised with multiple injuries including a broken neck, broken arm, shattered knee cap and facial injuries.
