= Collingwood Warriors SC =

Collingwood Warriors
- Full name: Collingwood Warriors Soccer Club
- Nicknames: Warriors, Collingwood
- Short name: CWSC
- Founded: 1996
- Dissolved: 1997
- Ground: Victoria Park; Olympic Park
- Capacity: 15'000; 18'500
- Head Coach: Zoran Matic
- League: National Soccer League
Home colours	Away colours	Third colours

Collingwood Warriors Soccer Club was an Australian semi-professional association football (soccer) club based in the inner-Melbourne suburb of Abbotsford. It participated in the National Soccer League in 1996–97, lasting only a solitary season. The club's most notable achievement was winning the last NSL Cup in the 1996–97 tournament, which would be the only silverware the club celebrated.

== History ==
The club was formed as a joint-venture between Australian Football League club Collingwood and Greek-backed former NSL club Heidelberg United, that was then trading as 'Melbourne Warriors'. The home strip was of a shirt with black and white stripes resembling the Australian rules club, with streaks of yellow resembling Heidelberg, with black shorts and white socks. The kit provider was Lotto which also provided a third kit, which was worn in the 1996–97 NSL Cup final. The club's match-day home-ground and place of training & administration was Victoria Park in Abbotsford, sharing with the Australian rules club during their respective off-season.

In the pre-season the club recruited Zoran Matic who had previously taken Adelaide City to two NSL championships and signed multiple experienced players leading to high-anticipation for the season. The Warriors defeated Marconi-Fairfield 1–0 in the last NSL Cup Despite a strong start to the season in which the team went seven matches without defeat, Collingwood's form slumped and it ended up finishing second from bottom on the table. The team also lacked money, and disbanded at the end of the 1996/97 season. Throughout this period, Heidelberg maintained a separate team in the Victorian Premier League. Con Boutsianis, Goran Lozanovski and Kimon Taliadoros scored equal most goals for the club at seven each, with Frank Juric making the most appearances, of twenty-five for the club.

== Notable former players ==
- Dean Anastasiadis
- Con Boutsianis
- Alan Davidson
- Goran Lozanovski
- Frank Juric
- Kimon Taliadoros
- Ernie Tapai
- Andrew Vlahos
- Brian MacNicol

== Honours ==
NSL Cup

- Winners: 1996–97

== See also ==
- Heidelberg United Football Club
- Collingwood Football Club
