= Kimon Taliadoros =

Australian soccer player, sports commentator and businessman

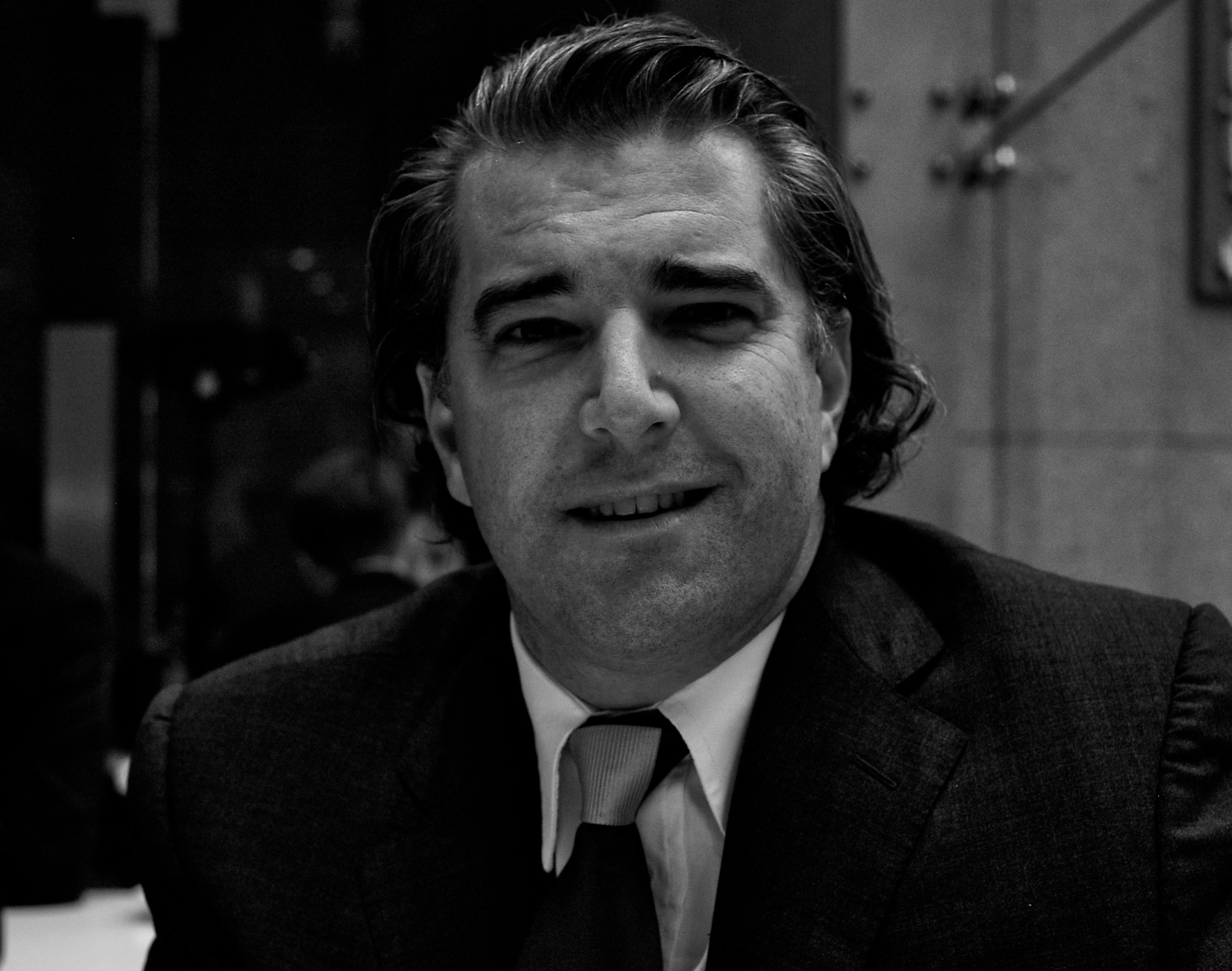

Personal information
- Full name: Kimon Taliadoros
- Date of birth: 28 March 1968 (age 58)
- Place of birth: Melbourne, Australia
- Position: Striker

Senior career*
Years	Team	Apps	(Gls)
1987–1992	South Melbourne	100	(45)
1992–1995	Marconi Stallions	74	(21)
1995–1996	Sydney Olympic	30	(8)
1996–1997	Collingwood Warriors	22	(7)
1997–1999	Sydney Olympic	12	(0)
1999–2001	Parramatta Power	6	(1)

International career^{‡}
1990–1993	Australia	9	(3)

Managerial career
- 2026–: Bentleigh Greens (technical director)
- * Club domestic league appearances and goals as of 7 July 2009 ‡ National team caps and goals as of 7 July 2009

Kimon Taliadoros (born 28 March 1968) is a former Australian footballer, sports commentator and businessman. He was President and CEO of Football Victoria from 2015 to 2023. He is the technical director for Bentleigh Greens.

== Football career ==
Taliadoros played over 11 seasons in the National Soccer League for South Melbourne, Marconi, Sydney Olympic, Collingwood Warriors and Parramatta Power. He also played nine times for the Australia national team.

Taliadoros was the first life member of the Australian Professional Footballers Association (formerly the "Australian Soccer Players' Association"), being elected to the Association's executive at its formation in 1993, then Chief Executive 1994–95 and President 1995–98.

== Post-football career ==
Taliadoros focused on developing a business career upon his retirement from football in 2002. He has worked for NineMSN, Boost Juice, News.com.au, and recently Australian brokerage firm Centric Wealth.

In addition to his business activities, Taliadoros is an occasional commentator for SBS Sport and Fox Sports Australia.
