= Con Boutsianis =

Australian soccer player

Personal information
- Full name: Constantinos Boutsianis
- Date of birth: 27 December 1971 (age 54)
- Place of birth: Melbourne, Australia
- Position: Midfielder

Youth career
- 1987: South Melbourne FC

Senior career*
| Years | Team | Apps | (Gls) |
| 1989–1995 | South Melbourne | 109 | (40) |
| 1996 | Heidelberg United | 14 | (3) |
| 1996–1997 | Collingwood Warriors | 20 | (7) |
| 1997 | Bentleigh Greens | 6 | (2) |
| 1997–1998 | South Melbourne | 26 | (7) |
| 1998–2000 | Perth Glory | 49 | (25) |
| 1999–2000 | Bolton Wanderers | 0 | (0) |
| 2000–2003 | South Melbourne | 48 | (24) |
| 2003 | Heidelberg United | 11 | (11) |
| 2003–2004 | South Melbourne | 25 | (3) |
| 2005 | Heidelberg United | 6 | (1) |
| 2005 | Bulleen Zebras | 12 | (0) |
| 2006–2007 | Oakleigh Cannons | 30 | (5) |
| 2009 | Essendon United | 3 | (1) |
| 2009 | Stonington City | 2 | (0) |
| Total | | 361 | (129) |

International career^{‡}
| 2001 | Australia | 4 | (4) |
Medal record
Representing Australia
Men's Association football
AFC–OFC Challenge Cup
| Runner-up | 2001 Japan |
- * Club domestic league appearances and goals as of 6 July 2009 ‡ National team caps and goals as of 17 May 2007

Constantinos "Con" Boutsianis (born 27 December 1971 in Melbourne) is an Australian soccer player and former international, noted for his ability in dead ball situations.

== Career ==
=== South Melbourne FC ===
Boutsianis was a boyhood South Melbourne Hellas fan and began playing at the club from age 10.

After impressive performances for the South Melbourne youth side, the legendary Hungarian coach Ferenc Puskas placed his faith in the young winger and called him up to the senior team.

Boutsianis began his senior career with South Melbourne in the National Soccer League in 1989, becoming known as a goalscoring midfielder. Boutsianis would be a part of the 1991 Championship winning side under Puskas. He quickly established himself as one of Australia's best talents, renowned for his free-kick and corner abilities.

After six years and 40 goals, he left South at the end of 1994/95 to join Heidelberg United for the 1996 Victorian Premier League season, before joining Collingwood Warriors for their one and only season in the NSL.

Following the club's demise at the end of the 1996/97 campaign, he had a short stint in the VPL with Bentleigh Greens, before rejoining South for the 1997/98 NSL season.

Boutsianis took the league by storm and flourished under manager Ange Postecoglou. He played a crucial role in the Grand Final against Carlton, scoring the controversial winning goal in the last minute after coming on as a substitute, ending a seven-year championship wait for Hellas. Paul Trimboli sent a long ball forward, finding Boutsianis in pursuit behind Carlton defender Sean Douglas. Boutsianis seemed to push Douglas to the ground before collecting the ball and proceeding to beat former teammate and Carlton goalkeeper Dean Anastasiadis.

=== Perth Glory ===
Despite being the hero of the Grand Final, Boutsianis went over to Perth Glory for the next two seasons, arguably reaching his peak as a player, scoring 25 goals in 49 appearances. He became a fan favourite in Perth due to his dead ball skills often scoring from free-kicks and corners. A short, unsuccessful stint with Bolton Wanderers followed.

=== Return to South Melbourne ===
After leaving Perth, he returned to Lakeside to play with South Melbourne in the 2000/01 side which finished on top of the table but ultimately lost the grand final to Wollongong, continuing his career-best form scoring 14 goals in 30 games.

Boutsianis would leave South for a 3rd time the next season, along with South coach Mike Petersen and South teammate Andy Vlahos to join the Football Kingz in New Zealand. Boutsianis ended up playing no games for the club and sought a return to South during the season by refusing to play. The Kingz eventually relented, on condition that he not play in the fixture between the two sides, at that time holding down the bottom two spots on the table. Boutsianis ended up taking the field and scoring the winner late in the game, and all up scored 8 goals in 15 games to take South from bottom of the table to fifth spot and into the finals.

=== Later career ===
The season though would be the beginning of the end for Boutsianis as a formidable player, as for the next 2 seasons he struggled to reach the potency he was known for. He ended up playing for several clubs in the VPL, and eventually signing with Oakleigh Cannons for the remainder of what was thought would be his last season. Oakleigh's exit from the 2006 VPL finals was expected to bring an end to Boutsianis' career, but he donned the boots again for the Cannons in the 2007 season.

In 2009 Boutsianis signed for Essendon United coached by P.Gani, who play in the Victorian Provisional North/West 1 league. He scored on his home debut with a trademark left-foot strike against Whittlesea United at Aberfeldie Park.

== International career ==
Boutsianis won four international caps for Australia. His debut came in the 2002 World Cup qualification match against Tonga, which Australia won 22–0, breaking the world record for the biggest victory margin in an international game. Boutsianis came on as a substitute and scored. In the next match, against American Samoa, Boutsianis was named as a starter. He scored a hat-trick as Australia broke their own record by winning 31–0. His first goal came directly from a corner. Boutsianis played two more games for the Socceroos, the last in August 2001 against Japan. He finished his international career with a record of four goals from four appearances.

== International goals ==
| No. | Date | Venue | Opponent | Score | Result | Competition |
|---|---|---|---|---|---|---|
| 1. | 9 April 2001 | Coffs Harbour International Stadium, Coffs Harbour, Australia | Tonga | 21–0 | 22–0 | 2002 FIFA World Cup qualification |
| 2. | 11 April 2001 | Coffs Harbour International Stadium, Coffs Harbour, Australia | American Samoa | 1–0 | 31–0 | 2002 FIFA World Cup qualification |
| 3. | 11 April 2001 | Coffs Harbour International Stadium, Coffs Harbour, Australia | American Samoa | 17–0 | 31–0 | 2002 FIFA World Cup qualification |
| 4. | 11 April 2001 | Coffs Harbour International Stadium, Coffs Harbour, Australia | American Samoa | 28–0 | 31–0 | 2002 FIFA World Cup qualification |

== Coaching and management ==
Since he retired, he has been helping youth and International professional players, and teams to succeed in all competitions around the World.

Before the 2008 Olympics, Boutsianis was invited by former team-mate James Galanis to work with the US Women's Olympic player, as she prepared for Beijing Olympic Games Carli Lloyd. Lloyd said, "After training with Con I became more confident in striking free kicks and I feel that I am more effective when in and around the box," "The way he communicated the mechanics of striking the ball was definitely world-class". Indeed, she ended scoring the winning goals for both Beijing and London Olympic Games.

Boutsianis now divides his time between Spain and Australia, running his own football coaching business teaching soccer technique to players at all ages and any level, Football First.,www.footballfirst.com.au.

His motto is "I will stack the odds in the player's favour, by making sure that when an opportunity to score arises, the chance is executed with absolute precision, because in crucial moments during a match, the margins are small, and as a consequence the only difference between winning and losing."

== Honours ==
South Melbourne FC NSL Championship: 1990/91, 1997/98

- NSL Premiership: 2000/01
- NSL Cup: 1989/90
- Dockerty Cup: 1989, 1991, 1993, 1995

Australia

- AFC–OFC Challenge Cup: runner-up 2001
