= 1996–97 National Soccer League =

Australian soccer season

NSL 1996-97
- League: National Soccer League
- Sport: Association football
- Duration: 1996–97
- Number of teams: 14

NSL season
- Champions: Brisbane Strikers
- Minor premiers: Sydney United
- Top scorer: David Zdrilic (21)

National Soccer League seasons
- ← 1995–96 1997–98 →

The 1996–97 National Soccer League season, was the 21st season of the National Soccer League in Australia.

== Teams ==
Location of teams in 1996–97 National Soccer League

Team	Home city	Home ground
Adelaide City	Adelaide	Hindmarsh Stadium
Brisbane Strikers	Brisbane	Lang Park
Canberra Cosmos	Canberra	Bruce Stadium
Collingwood Warriors	Melbourne	Victoria Park; Olympic Park
Gippsland Falcons	Morwell	Falcons Park
Marconi-Stallions	Sydney	Marconi Stadium
Melbourne Knights	Melbourne	Knights Stadium
Newcastle Breakers	Newcastle	Breakers Stadium
Perth Glory	Perth	Perth Oval
South Melbourne	Melbourne	Lakeside Stadium
Sydney United	Sydney	Edensor Park
UTS Olympic	Sydney	Belmore Oval
West Adelaide	Adelaide	Hindmarsh Stadium
Wollongong City	Wollongong	Brandon Park

== Season overview ==
It was contested by 14 teams, and Brisbane Strikers won the championship. Perth Glory and Collingwood Warriors entered the competition.

== Regular season ==
=== League table ===
Pos	Team	Pld	W	D	L	GF	GA	GD	Pts	Qualification
1	Sydney United	26	17	5	4	67	33	+34	56	Qualification for the Finals series
2	Brisbane Strikers (C)	26	15	2	9	55	40	+15	47	Qualification for the Finals series
3	South Melbourne	26	14	4	8	39	25	+14	46	Qualification for the Finals series
4	Adelaide City	26	11	10	5	32	22	+10	43	Qualification for the Finals series
5	Marconi Fairfield	26	12	4	10	41	37	+4	40	Qualification for the Finals series
6	Melbourne Knights	26	11	6	9	36	32	+4	39	Qualification for the Finals series
7	Perth Glory	26	11	5	10	48	41	+7	38	
8	West Adelaide	26	10	3	13	39	51	−12	33	
9	UTS Olympic	26	8	8	10	41	46	−5	32	
10	Wollongong Wolves	26	8	8	10	42	48	−6	32	
11	Newcastle Breakers	26	7	9	10	40	46	−6	30	
12	Gippsland Falcons	26	8	6	12	33	41	−8	30	
13	Collingwood Warriors	26	6	9	11	32	44	−12	27	
14	Canberra Cosmos	26	2	5	19	30	69	−39	11	

Updated to match(es) played on unknown. Source: rsssf.com
Rules for classification: 1) points; 2) goal difference; 3) number of goals scored.
(C) Champions

== Finals series ==
Elimination finals
3	South Melbourne	4	3	(7)
6	Melbourne Knights	1	0	(1)
4	Adelaide City	0	4	(4)
5	Marconi Fairfield	3	0	(3)

Semifinals
1	Sydney United	0	2	(2)
2	Brisbane Strikers (a)	1	1	(2)
South Melbourne	1
Adelaide City	0

Preliminary final
Sydney United	1
South Melbourne	0

Grand final
Sydney United	0
Brisbane Strikers	2

=== Grand Final ===
25 May 1997
15:00 AEST

Brisbane Strikers	2 – 0	Sydney United
Farina 47'; Brown 69'	(report)

Suncorp Stadium, Brisbane
Attendance: 40,446
Referee: Simon Micallef

== Individual awards ==
- Player of the Year: Kresimir Marusic (Sydney United)
- U-21 Player of the Year: Kasey Wehrman (Brisbane Strikers)
- Top Scorer: David Zdrilic (Sydney United) – 21 goals
- Coach of the Year: Branko Culina (Sydney United)
