= National Soccer League =

Australian sports league

- Organising body: Australian Soccer Association
- Founded: 1977; 49 years ago
- First season: 1977
- Folded: 2004
- Country: Australia
- Other club from: New Zealand
- Confederation: OFC (Oceania)
- Number of clubs: 42 (total)
- Level on pyramid: 1
- Last champions: Perth Glory (2nd title)
- Most championships: Marconi Stallions; South Melbourne; Sydney City (4 titles each)
- Most premierships: Melbourne Knights (4 titles)
- Broadcaster(s): Network Ten (1977–1979); Seven Network (1998–2000); ABC (2001); SBS (2002–2004)

The National Soccer League (NSL) was the top-level soccer league in Australia, run by Soccer Australia and later the Australian Soccer Association. The NSL, the A-League's predecessor, spanned 28 seasons from its inception in 1977 until its demise in 2004, when it was succeeded by the A-League competition run by Football Federation Australia, the successor to the Australian Soccer Association.

During the history of the NSL the league was contested by a total of 42 teams; 41 based in Australia and one based in New Zealand. Seasons initially ran during the winter seasons, until 1989 when this was changed to the summer season. In 1984, the league was split into two conferences (Northern and Southern) to introduce more teams into the competition; the league returned to a single division in 1987. The competition was known by various names through sponsorships; these names included the Philips Soccer League, the Quit National Soccer League, Olympic Airways Soccer League, Coca-Cola Soccer League, the Ericsson Cup and the A-League.

From the league's inaugural season to its demise in 2004, a total of 13 clubs were crowned champions through either a system of first past the post or a finals series that culminated in a grand final. The NSL was Australia's first national sporting league predating the likes of the AFL and NRL.

== History ==
=== Origin ===
Competition between club sides from different states existed in various forms prior to the formation of the NSL. The petroleum company Ampol sponsored cup competitions in the various states, starting with New South Wales in 1957, with other states following later. Later a national Ampol Cup was conducted which continued throughout the 1960s. From 1962 until 1968 an Australia Cup was held, but its ambition of becoming an FA Cup style knockout competition went unfulfilled. In the 1970s the top sides from Melbourne and Sydney played off in an end of season series, but the tournament did not seem to quite capture the legitimacy and popularity that was hoped for.

Plans for a national home and away league went back as far as 1965 for a 1967 start, and were followed up by variations on the theme throughout the 1960s and early 1970s, but faced opposition variously from clubs, who deemed the notion uneconomical, and state federations who feared losing their power. Australia's qualification for the 1974 World Cup led to various discussions in 1975 and 1976, with eventually 14 teams being chosen to participate in the inaugural season of the national league.

The transition from state-based leagues to a national competition was not all smooth. The Victorian Soccer Federation was reluctant for its big clubs to be involved and it appeared the dream of Alex Pongrass of St George and Frank Lowy of Hakoah Sydney for a nationwide club competition would not evolve. Little-known Mooroolbark from Melbourne's outer eastern suburbs broke the deadlock by joining the competition, bringing three other Victorian sides with it, making the national league a reality.

=== Sydney dominance (1977–1983) ===
The first seven seasons of the league would be dominated by Sydney clubs, with Sydney City winning four titles, and only West Adelaide being able to wrest the title from New South Wales. West secured the 1978 championship after scoring a late equaliser in an Adelaide derby against Adelaide City in the final round of the season. The competition at this stage was a simple first past the post. A post season finals series was played during this era but was considered more of an exhibition series rather than a legitimate game to decide the national champion, although some confusion still exists on this matter particularly amongst some Heidelberg supporters who consider the 1980 'final' as a legitimate decider.

=== Conference system (1984–1986) ===
Shrinking crowds led to the radical move of introducing more teams (mainly from Victoria and New South Wales) and splitting the league into two conferences, with the winner of each division to play-off in an end of year two legged final. For season 1984 the 'Australian' Conference had competing teams from New South Wales and the ACT, whilst the 'National' Conference consisted of Victorian, South Australian and Queensland clubs. For 1985 and 1986 this reverted to 'Northern' and 'Southern' Conferences. Strangely, the competition's most geographically northern sides, Brisbane Lions and Brisbane City were in the latter grouping.

This period saw South Melbourne become the first Victorian team to win the league, followed by Brunswick Juventus, and Adelaide City, all Southern conference sides. At the end of the 1986 season, the system was scrapped, and about half the teams were dumped back to their respective state leagues. The criteria used to decide who stayed and who went was based 50% on the 1986 playing record, 40% on past playing record, and 10% on crowd support. The result was that only one team from outside Sydney and Melbourne, reigning champions Adelaide City, was retained.

=== Return to single division and last years of winter football (1987–1989) ===
The revamped league suffered a major setback early on when Sydney City pulled out of the competition after just one round into the new season. Apart from returning to a single division, the league also dispensed with finals for the 1987 season, reverting to first past the post. Many considered this an ill-considered move, as it robbed the league of its most high-profile games. Finals were re-introduced from 1988, and were to remain until the league's demise. The 1989 season would be the last to be played in winter. This period saw a re-emergence of New South Wales dominance with all titles, minor premierships and runners-up being from that state.

=== Birth of summer football (1989–1996) ===
Efforts to transition the league to a summer season date back to the early 1980s but were only implemented in the 1989/90 season. The reasoning behind this shift was straightforward: moving to summer would help the league avoid being overshadowed by the Australian Football League and Australian Rugby League seasons while also ensuring better playing surfaces and improved spectator comfort due to favorable weather conditions.

Despite the boost from this change, some clubs struggled to stay in the league, leading to relegations to the state leagues. Among them were former champions Brunswick Juventus, St George, and APIA Leichhardt, as well as once-strong contenders like Heidelberg and Preston.

At the same time, soccer authorities pushed clubs to market themselves to a broader Australian audience rather than catering primarily to their migrant fan bases. This initiative led to club name and logo changes, a ban on ethnic flags, and other modifications. While clubs reluctantly complied, fans in the stands largely continued to use the traditional names.

During this era, clubs such as Marconi, South Melbourne, Adelaide City, and Melbourne Knights dominated the league, winning multiple titles and making frequent grand final appearances.

The decade also saw the emergence of future Australian stars, including Mark Viduka, Mark Bresciano, Vince Grella, Tony Popovic, and Mark Schwarzer, who would later form the core of Australia's "Golden Generation."

In an effort to streamline the competition, the Australian Soccer Federation proposed reducing the number of NSL teams from 14 to 12. In 1995, it announced plans for a new parallel competition called the A-League. Following legal challenges, the A-League eventually replaced the NSL but largely retained the same teams, making the transition more of a rebranding than a completely new competition. Before 1995–96 season, the league secured a sponsorship deal with Ericsson, leading to a rebranding as the "Ericsson Cup." The sponsorship was initially set to last until 2000 but was terminated a year early in 1999. Despite the new name, the A-League and NSL names continued to be used interchangeably.

=== New clubs and attempts to enter the mainstream (1996–2001) ===
From 1996 onwards the league attempted to revitalise the competition and attempt to hook into the mainstream support by finally introducing a team from Western Australia, in the form of Perth Glory, as well as other new entities which promised to deliver mainstream support, as well as being fully professional outfits as opposed to the majority of clubs and players who were only semi-professional. Among the new clubs at this time were the Collingwood Warriors, Carlton, Northern Spirit (GHFA Spirit as of 2004) and Parramatta Power, as well as New Zealand's first professional team, the Football Kingz.

These clubs would have varying degrees of success on and off the field. Collingwood Warriors barely managed to last a season, while Carlton reached the grand final in its debut year, but was unable to attract a substantial fan base. Northern Spirit started off with record crowds, and a good debut season reaching the finals, but gradually crowds declined, and financial difficulties along with a controversial takeover by Rangers, did not help matters. They would survive until the end of the NSL, but fold thereafter. Parramatta Power failed to gather much support, placed as it was in the midst of the already crowded western Sydney soccer market, and it too would not last beyond the end of the NSL. Perth Glory became the most successful of the new mainstream entrants. High crowds and good performances throughout the NSL's last decade made Perth Glory for many observers the benchmark and role model for all future entrants to the Australian top-flight.

A then record grand final crowd of 40,000 people saw the Brisbane Strikers become the first Queensland side to win the title in season 1996/97, but it never resulted in Brisbane gaining much bigger crowds in the following seasons than they were accustomed to. South Melbourne FC under Ange Postecoglou won back-to-back titles in the late 1990s, and by also winning the 1999 Oceania Club Championship, earning the right to play in the 2000 FIFA Club World Championship, where it put in some respectable performances against sides such as Manchester United and a tidy sum in prize money. Wollongong Wolves became the only side from regional Australia to win the league, with their back-to-back titles in 1999–2000 and 2000–01. The 1999–2000 Grand Final against Perth Glory at Subiaco Oval in Perth saw a record attendance of 43,242, overtaking the 1997 figure in Brisbane and a record that would remain until the 2007 A-League Grand Final in Melbourne. The cancellation of the 2001 FIFA Club World Championship however was a major blow to the league as clubs which had seen a way of making a substantial amount of much needed money.

=== Decline and demise (2001–2004) ===
After the 2001 FIFA Club World Championship was cancelled, the NSL was in great turmoil. High-profile Australian players began to leave the NSL due to more enticing offers from overseas leagues.

In 1998, Soccer Australia sold the television rights for the NSL and Socceroos matches to the Seven Network in a 10-year contract that was worth $2.5 million a year. Seven bought the rights to be one of the flagships of its pay TV sport channel, C7 Sport.

It also broadcast a small amount of coverage on its free-to-air network. At one point in 2000, the amount of free-to-air coverage on the NSL was only a one-hour highlights package of the NSL after midnight on Wednesdays. Many believe Channel 7 deliberately refused to air games to kill off interest in the league that was flourishing in the 90s.

In 2002, C7 Sport closed after the Seven Network lost the Australian Football League (AFL) rights and pay TV networks stopped carrying the channel. The next year, Seven severed its contract in the last week of Soccer Australia's existence. This left the NSL with no TV coverage at all until SBS picked up the rights soon after.

The consequent lack of sponsorship meant the league fell into even further decline which led to its eventual demise at the end of the 2003–04 season. Highlights were few and far between, but Sydney Olympic re-emerged as a genuine leading club for the first time in a decade, winning its second title, and Perth Glory went on to win the last two titles of the NSL, after previously having lost two grand finals.

The birth of Adelaide United, as a quickly formed replacement of Adelaide City who withdrew just before the start of the final NSL season, was perhaps the sole major highlight of this era, as they put in good performances, but most importantly, registered crowds which had not been seen in Adelaide since the heyday of Adelaide City and West Adelaide.

The league in 2003–04 was won by Perth Glory after a 1–0 win against Parramatta Power on 4 April 2004, almost 27 years to the day that the national competition began. Nik Mrdja had the honour of scoring the last goal in the NSL, a 98th minute golden goal to seal the championship for Perth. After this, national competition went into recess for a year and a half. In November 2004, 8 teams, including 5 from the now defunct NSL, formed the A-League, the revamped national competition whilst many were denied the opportunity due to the bidding process and 1 team for 1 city rule. The first competition began on 26 August 2005, ending the long recess and killing off the NSL and its 24-year history.

== Competition format ==
The competition structure changed many times throughout the NSL's history. From its inception in 1977 until 1983, it was simply a matter of first past the post. However a compromise format was devised between the traditional first past the post and the Australian system of finals. In 1978, 1979 (two-legged Grand Final), 1980 and 1982 a finals series was conducted but the winner of the Grand Final did not determine who won the title. From 1984 until 1986, the league introduced more teams split into two conferences (1984 – Australian Conference, New South Wales/Australian Capital Territory clubs and National Conference, Victoria, South Australia, Queensland; 1985 and 1986 – Northern Conference, New South Wales/Australian Capital Territory clubs and Southern Conference for the rest) with 12 teams in each. The top five in each division would qualify for the playoffs, with the winner of each of the divisional playoffs playing off in a two-legged Grand Final. In 1987, the league dumped 11 teams, scrapped the split divisions, and the championship system reverted to first past the post.

In 1988 the league re-introduced a finals system, with the top five sides qualifying for the playoffs. In season 1992/93, the league increased the finalists to six. This system was used for the rest of the league's duration, except for season 2002/03 when the top six sides played a further series of home and away games against each other, with the top two playing off in the Grand Final.

The NSL also used a variety of point systems throughout its history. From 1977 until season 1991/92, teams were awarded two points for a win, one point for draw, and none for a loss. The exceptions to this were 1979, in which wins by four goals or more were awarded a bonus point, and 1983, in which three points were awarded for a win. From season 1992/93 onwards three points were awarded for a win, except for season 1994/95. In that season, four points were awarded for a win, with games ending in draws, being decided by penalty shootouts at the end of the game. The winner of the shootout received two points, the loser one point.

=== Related competitions ===
Successful NSL clubs gained qualification into the continental competition, the Oceania Club Championship, although the competition only occurred in 1987, 1999 and 2001. In addition to the main league competition, the NSL also held a knock-out cup competition between 1977 and the 1997 season known as the NSL Cup. The NSL Cup was initially held during the regular season, before gradually becoming a pre-season warm-up tournament. Between 1984 and 2004 National Youth League ran in conjunction with the NSL as a national youth developmental and reserve league.

== Clubs ==
Team	Location	Also known as	Years participating	Total NSL seasons	NSL Honours	Current status	P	W	D	L	GF	GA
Adelaide City	Adelaide	Adelaide Juventus; Adelaide City Giants; Adelaide City Zebras; Adelaide (City) Force	1977–2003	27	1986, 1991–92, 1993–94 National Soccer League; 1979, 1989, 1991–92 NSL Cup	National Premier Leagues South Australia	768	321	194	253	1134	913
Adelaide United	Adelaide		2003–2004	1		A-League Men	28	13	7	8	34	35
APIA Leichhardt	Sydney	Leichhardt Strikers	1979–1992	14	1987 National Soccer League; 1982, 1988 NSL Cup	National Premier Leagues NSW	371	135	104	132	462	471
Blacktown City	Sydney		1980–1981; 1984–1986; 1989–1990	7		National Premier Leagues NSW	181	51	39	91	222	328
Brisbane City	Brisbane	Azzurri; Brisbane City Gladiators	1977–1986	10		National Premier Leagues Queensland	266	75	72	119	292	407
Brisbane Lions	Brisbane	Hollandia	1977–1986 1988	11		A-League Men as Brisbane Roar; National Premier Leagues Queensland as Queensland Lions	294	92	79	123	362	442
Brisbane Strikers	Brisbane	Brisbane United	1991–2004	13	1996–97 National Soccer League	National Premier Leagues Queensland	358	129	79	150	506	539
Brunswick Juventus	Melbourne	Brunswick Pumas; Melbourne BUSC; Melbourne Zebras	1984–1988; 1993–1995	7	1985 National Soccer League	Victorian State League 3 as Brunswick Zebras	180	67	37	76	207	251
Canberra City	Canberra	Canberra City Arrows; Canberra City Olympians	1977–1986	10		Capital League Division 2	266	79	67	120	335	394
Canberra Cosmos	Canberra		1995–2001	6		Defunct	176	35	40	101	216	362
Canterbury-Marrickville	Sydney	Canterbury-Marrickville Olympic	1986	1		NSW League One as Canterbury-Bankstown FC	22	2	7	13	17	41
Carlton	Melbourne		1997–2001	4		Defunct	104	45	24	35	168	127
Collingwood Warriors	Melbourne		1996–1997	1	1996–97 NSL Cup	Defunct	26	6	9	11	32	41
Football Kingz	Auckland (NZ)	Auckland Kingz	1999–2004	5		Defunct	135	38	27	70	182	265
Footscray JUST	Melbourne	Footscray Eagles; Melbourne City JUST	1977–1989	13		Defunct	346	100	96	150	379	502
Green Gully	Melbourne	Green Gully Ajax	1984–1986	3		National Premier Leagues Victoria	72	17	18	37	74	103
Heidelberg United	Melbourne	Fitzroy United; Heidelberg Alexander	1977–1987; 1989; 1990–1995	17	1992–93, 1996–97 NSL Cup	National Premier Leagues Victoria	451	160	122	169	595	651
Inter Monaro	Canberra-Queanbeyan		1985–1986	2		National Premier Leagues Capital Football as Monaro Panthers	44	10	11	23	47	80
Marconi	Sydney	Marconi-Fairfield; Marconi-Datsun Leopards; Marconi Stallions	1977–2004	28	1979, 1988, 1989, 1992–93 National Soccer League; 1980 NSL Cup	National Premier Leagues NSW	786	356	186	244	1293	986
Melbourne Knights	Melbourne	Essendon Lions; Melbourne Croatia; Melbourne CSC	1984–2004	21	1994–95, 1995–96 National Soccer League; 1994–95 NSL Cup	National Premier Leagues Victoria	579	248	130	201	877	779
Mooroolbark	Melbourne	Mooroolbark United	1977	1		Victorian State League 2	26	5	5	16	31	61
Morwell Falcons	Morwell	Gippsland Falcons; Eastern Pride	1992–2001	9		Latrobe Valley Soccer League as Falcons 2000	254	66	69	119	265	403
Newcastle Breakers	Newcastle	Newcastle BHP Breakers	1991–1994 1995–2000	8		Defunct	225	62	63	110	276	365
Newcastle KB United	Newcastle	Newcastle United; Newcastle KB Raiders	1978–1983	6		Defunct	168	64	47	57	237	220
Newcastle Rosebud United	Newcastle	Adamstown Rosebuds	1984–1986	3	1984 NSL Cup	National Premier Leagues Northern NSW as Adamstown Rosebud	72	24	14	34	91	130
Newcastle United	Newcastle		2000–2004	4		A-League Men as Newcastle Jets	114	36	35	43	137	157
Northern Spirit	Sydney		1998–2004	6		National Premier Leagues NSW as NWS Spirit FC	174	62	32	80	223	284
Parramatta Eagles	Sydney	Parramatta Melita	1984; 1989–1995	7	1990–91, 1993–94 NSL Cup	NSW League One as Parramatta FC	185	61	53	71	212	235
Parramatta Power	Sydney		1999–2004	5		Defunct	147	68	23	56	250	204
Penrith City	Sydney		1984–1985	2		Defunct	50	12	16	22	53	76
Perth Glory	Perth		1996–2004	8	2002–03, 2003–04 National Soccer League	A-League Men	242	138	46	58	484	286
Preston Lions	Melbourne	Preston Rams; Preston Makedonia	1981–1993	13		National Premier Leagues Victoria	347	121	101	125	442	424
South Melbourne	Melbourne	South Melbourne Hellas; South Melbourne Gunners; South Melbourne Lakers	1977–2004	28	1984, 1990–91, 1997–98, 1998–99 National Soccer League; 1989–90, 1995–96 NSL Cup	National Premier Leagues Victoria	791	378	183	230	1260	917
St George	Sydney	St George-Budapest	1977–1980; 1982–1991	14	1983 National Soccer League	National Premier Leagues NSW	371	135	103	133	516	520
Sunshine George Cross	Melbourne		1984–1991	8		National Premier Leagues Victoria as Caroline Springs George Cross	202	56	51	95	229	320
Sydney City	Sydney	Eastern Suburbs Hakoah; Sydney City Slickers	1977–1987	11	1977, 1980, 1981, 1982 National Soccer League; 1986 NSL Cup	NSW League One as Hakoah Sydney City East	273	155	66	52	529	273
Sydney Olympic	Sydney	Pan-Hellenic; Sydney Olympians; UTS Olympic; Olympic Sharks	1977–1979; 1981–2004	27	1989–90, 2001–02 National Soccer League; 1983, 1985 NSL Cup	National Premier Leagues NSW	770	325	192	253	1124	963
Sydney United	Sydney	Sydney Croatia; Sydney CSC; Sydney United Pumas	1984–2004	21	1987 NSL Cup	National Premier Leagues NSW	576	239	144	193	762	721
West Adelaide	Adelaide	West Adelaide Hellas; West Adelaide Hawks (West) Adelaide Sharks	1977–1986; 1989–1990; 1991–1999	19	1978 National Soccer League	National Premier Leagues South Australia	511	170	105	236	634	780
Western Suburbs	Sydney		1977–1978	2		Amalgamated in 1979 with APIA Leichhardt	52	20	13	19	79	74
Wollongong Macedonia	Wollongong	Wollongong United; Illawarra Lions	1990–1991	1		Illawarra Premier League as Wollongong United	26	3	9	14	23	53
Wollongong Wolves	Wollongong	Wollongong City	1981–1986; 1988–2004	23	1999–2000, 2000–01 National Soccer League	National Premier Leagues NSW	632	211	166	255	867	966

== Champions ==
Year	Champion	Runner up	Score	Venue	Crowd
1977	Sydney City	Marconi Stallions	Season decided on league standings		
1978	West Adelaide	Sydney City	Season decided on league standings		
1979	Marconi Stallions	Heidelberg United	Season decided on league standings		
1980	Sydney City	Heidelberg United	Season decided on league standings		
1981	Sydney City	South Melbourne	Season decided on league standings		
1982	Sydney City	St George	Season decided on league standings		
1983	St George	Sydney City	Season decided on league standings		
1984	South Melbourne	Sydney Olympic	4–2 agg. over two legs	Olympic Park; St. George Stadium	10,000; 11,221
1985	Brunswick Juventus	Sydney City	2–0 agg. over two legs	St. George Stadium; Olympic Park	2,491; 7,560
1986	Adelaide City	Sydney Olympic	3–2 agg. over two legs	Hindmarsh Stadium; Parramatta Stadium	12,232; 14,032
1987	APIA Leichhardt	Preston Lions	Season decided on league standings		
1988	Marconi Stallions	Sydney United	2–2 (5–4 on penalties)	Parramatta Stadium	17,064
1989	Marconi Stallions	Sydney Olympic	1–0	Parramatta Stadium	23,387
1989–90	Sydney Olympic	Marconi Stallions	2–0	Parramatta Stadium	26,353
1990–91	South Melbourne	Melbourne Knights	1–1 (5–4 on penalties)	Olympic Park	21,338
1991–92	Adelaide City	Melbourne Knights	0–0 (4–2 on penalties)	Olympic Park	15,463
1992–93	Marconi Stallions	Adelaide City	1–0	Parramatta Stadium	13,376
1993–94	Adelaide City	Melbourne Knights	1–0	Olympic Park	13,790
1994–95	Melbourne Knights	Adelaide City	2–0	Hindmarsh Stadium	15,573
1995–96	Melbourne Knights	Marconi Stallions	2–1	Olympic Park	14,258
1996–97	Brisbane Strikers	Sydney United	2–0	Lang Park	40,446
1997–98	South Melbourne	Carlton	2–1	Olympic Park	16,000
1998–99	South Melbourne	Sydney United	3–2	Olympic Park	15,194
1999–00	Wollongong Wolves	Perth Glory	3–3 (7–6 on penalties)	Subiaco Oval	43,242
2000–01	Wollongong Wolves	South Melbourne	2–1	Parramatta Stadium	13,402
2001–02	Sydney Olympic	Perth Glory	1–0	Subiaco Oval	42,735
2002–03	Perth Glory	Sydney Olympic	2–0	Subiaco Oval	38,111
2003–04	Perth Glory	Parramatta Power	1–0	Parramatta Stadium	9,630

=== Performance by club ===
Club	Winners	Runners-up	Winning years
Sydney City	4	3	1977, 1980, 1981, 1982
Marconi Stallions	4	3	1979, 1988, 1989, 1992–93
South Melbourne	4	2	1984, 1990–91, 1997–98, 1998–99
Adelaide City	3	2	1986, 1991–92, 1993–94
Sydney Olympic	2	4	1989–90, 2001–02
Melbourne Knights	2	3	1994–95, 1995–96
Perth Glory	2	2	2002–03, 2003–04
Wollongong Wolves	2	0	1999–00, 2000–01
St. George	1	1	1983
Brisbane Strikers	1	0	1996–97
APIA Leichhardt	1	0	1987
Brunswick Juventus	1	0	1985
West Adelaide	1	0	1978
Sydney United	0	3	
Heidelberg United	0	2	
Preston Lions	0	1	
Carlton	0	1	
Parramatta Power	0	1	

== See also ==
- Johnny Warren Medal
- Joe Marston Medal
