= 1998–99 Sydney United FC season =

Sydney United 58 FC
1998–1999 season
- Chairman: Marko Franović
- Manager: Dave Mitchell
- Stadium: Sydney United Sports Centre
- National Soccer League: 1st (League); Runners-Up (Finals)
- Top goalscorer: League = Mile Sterjovski (16); Overall = Mile Sterjovski (18)
- Highest home attendance: 11,600 vs. South Melbourne (26 April 1999); NSL Major Semi-Final
- Lowest home attendance: 2,118 vs. Melbourne Knights (7 March 1999); National Soccer League
- Average home league attendance: 4,546
- Biggest win: 4–0 vs. Gippsland Falcons (8 December 1998); National Soccer League
- Biggest defeat: 0-2 vs. Marconi Fairfield (18 October 1998); National Soccer League

The 1998–99 season was Sydney United's sixteenth in the NSL. After a major off‑season reshuffle that saw the departures of Zeljko Kalac, Marko Rudan, Paul Bilokapic, Jason Culina, Robbie Hooker, and Stuart Munro, the club strengthened with the arrivals of Walter Ardone, Nathan Day, veteran goalkeeper Mike Gibson, and returning players Joe Caleta and Ante Moric.

Under second‑year head coach David Mitchell, United claimed the NSL Premiership, finishing one point ahead of South Melbourne. In the finals, they lost the two leg Major Semi-Final to South Melbourne but rebounded with a 2–1 win over Perth Glory in the Preliminary Final. The Grand Final again pitted them against South Melbourne, where United were defeated 3–2 at Olympic Park.

Mile Sterjovski finished as the club's top scorer with 18 goals, while Dave Mitchell was named the NSL coach of the year.

== Players ==
Note: Flags indicate national team as defined under FIFA eligibility rules; some limited exceptions apply. Players may hold more than one non-FIFA nationality.

No.	Pos.	Nation	Player
1	GK	AUS	Andrew Crews
2	DF	AUS	David Barrett
4	DF	CRO	Velimir Kuprešak (Captain)
5	DF	AUS	Richard Pleša
6	MF	AUS	Joe Vrkic
7	MF	AUS	Jacob Burns
8	MF	AUS	Walter Ardone
9	FW	AUS	Mile Sterjovski
10	FW	AUS	Nathan Day
11	MF	AUS	Steve Berry
12	MF	AUS	Drew Laurence
13	DF	AUS	Joe Moric
14	FW	AUS	Joe Caleta
15	MF	AUS	Danny Townsend

No.	Pos.	Nation	Player
16	FW	AUS	Abbas Saad
17	DF	AUS	Michael Santalab
18	FW	AUS	Dave Mitchell
19	FW	AUS	Joel Griffiths
20	GK	AUS	Barney Smith
21	MF	AUS	Steve Eagleton
22	DF	AUS	Tom Maric
23	MF	AUS	Dominic Ušalj
24	MF	AUS	Robert Angievski
25	MF	AUS	Ante Moric
26	FW	AUS	Daniel Kukučka
28	MF	AUS	Peter Bennett
30	GK	AUS	Mike Gibson

=== Transfers in ===
No.	Pos.	Nat.	Name	Age	Moving from	Type	Transfer window	Ends	Transfer fee	Source
8	MF	(Australia)	Walter Ardone	26	Sydney Olympic (Australia)	Transfer	Pre-season		Free	
10	FW	(Australia)	Nathan Day	24	Adelaide Sharks (Australia)	Transfer	Pre-season		Free	
11	MF	(Australia)	Steve Berry	29	Blacktown City (Australia)	Loan	Pre-season		Free	
14	FW	(Australia)	Joe Caleta	32	Woodlands Wellington (Singapore)	Transfer	Pre-season		Free	
20	GK	(Australia)	Barney Smith	20	Canberra Cosmos (Australia)	Transfer	Pre-season		Free	
25	MF	(Australia)	Ante Moric	28	Canberra Cosmos (Australia)	Transfer	Pre-season		Free	
21	DF	(Australia)	Steve Eagleton	20	Bankstown City Lions (Australia)	Transfer	Pre-season		Free	
22	FW	(Australia)	Drew Laurence	19	Unknown	Transfer	Pre-season		Free	
30	GK	(Australia)	Mike Gibson	35	Marconi Stallions (Australia)	Transfer	Pre-season		Free	

=== Transfers out ===
No.	Pos.	Nat.	Name	Age	Moving to	Type	Transfer window	Transfer fee	Source
30	GK	(Australia)	Zeljko Kalac	25	Roda JC (Netherlands)	Transfer	Pre-season		
24	DF	(Australia)	Marko Rudan	22	Northern Spirit (Australia)	Transfer	Pre-season		
17	MF	(Australia)	Paul Bilokapic	21	Northern Spirit (Australia)	Transfer	Pre-season		
1	GK	(Australia)	John Perosh	24	Northern Spirit (Australia)	Transfer	Pre-season		
15	MF	(Australia)	Jason Culina	17	Sydney Olympic (Australia)	Transfer	Pre-season	$50,000	
16	MF	(Australia)	Dean Culina	20	South Melbourne (Australia)	Transfer	Pre-season	Free	
24	FW	(Australia)	Mario Jermen	23	NK Zadarkomerc (Croatia)	Transfer	Pre-season		
7	FW	(Australia)	Robbie Hooker	31	Marconi Stallions (Australia)	Transfer	Pre-season		
8	MF	(England)	Marcus Phillips	23	Marconi Stallions (Australia)	Transfer	Pre-season		
27	FW	(Australia)	Nick Bosevski	20	Marconi Stallions (Australia)	Loan return	Pre-season		
13	DF	(Scotland)	Stuart Munro	34	retirement		Pre-season		
12	MF	(Bosnia and Herzegovina)	Azur Mujanović	26	Bankstown City Lions (Australia)	Transfer	Pre-season		
9	FW	(Australia)	Tony Krslovic	28	Manly Warringah Dolphins (Australia)	Transfer	Pre-season		
14	MF	(Australia)	Steve Refenes	28	retirement	End of Contract	Pre-season		
26	DF	(Croatia)	Marin Galić	30	Free agent	End of Contract	Pre-season		

== Competitions ==
=== Overview ===
Competition	First match	Last match	Starting round	Final position	Record							
Competition	First match	Last match	Starting round	Final position	Pld	W	D	L	GF	GA	GD	Win %
National Soccer League	8 October 1998	28 April 1999	Matchday 1	1st	28	18	4	6	53	33	+20	64.29
Final Series	5 May 1999	30 May 1999	Major Semi-Final	Runner's Up	4	1	1	2	4	6	−2	25.00
Total					32	19	5	8	57	39	+18	59.38

Source: Competitions

=== National Soccer League ===
==== League table ====
Pos	Team	Pld	W	D	L	GF	GA	GD	Pts	Qualification
1	Sydney United	28	18	4	6	53	33	+20	58	Qualification for the Finals series
2	South Melbourne (C)	28	17	6	5	50	26	+24	57	Qualification for the Finals series and the Oceania Club Championship
3	Perth Glory	28	16	5	7	62	37	+25	53	Qualification for the Finals series
4	Marconi Fairfield	28	15	3	10	53	47	+6	48	Qualification for the Finals series
5	Northern Spirit	28	14	4	10	36	35	+1	46	Qualification for the Finals series
6	Adelaide City	28	13	6	9	39	26	+13	45	Qualification for the Finals series
7	Sydney Olympic	28	12	7	9	46	36	+10	43	
8	Newcastle Breakers	28	11	7	10	29	33	−4	40	
9	Brisbane Strikers	28	11	6	11	41	47	−6	39	
10	Wollongong Wolves	28	8	8	12	45	52	−7	32	
11	Carlton	28	9	4	15	47	47	0	31	
12	Melbourne Knights	28	8	5	15	32	43	−11	29	
13	West Adelaide	28	7	6	15	36	46	−10	27	
14	Gippsland Falcons	28	5	10	13	17	44	−27	25	
15	Canberra Cosmos	28	4	3	21	21	55	−34	15	

Source: rsssf.com
Rules for classification: 1) points; 2) goal difference; 3) number of goals scored.
(C) Champions

==== Pre-season Matches ====
4 September 1998	Newcastle Breakers	2–2	Sydney United	Birmingham Gardens, New South Wales
			Barrett; Kupresak	Stadium: Breakers Stadium

18-19 September 1998	Macarthur Rams	1–3	Sydney United	Campbelltown, New South Wales
			Plesa; Laurence; Caleta	Stadium: Lynwood Park

26 September 1998	Marconi Stallions	2–4	Sydney United	Bossley Park, New South Wales
	Zoric 45'; Kim 69'		Kim 40' (og); Usalj 47'; Griffiths 48'; Sterjovski 89'	Stadium: Marconi Stadium; Referee: Matthew Breeze

==== Matches ====
11 October 1998 1	Sydney United	1–1	Newcastle Breakers	Edensor Park, New South Wales
	Sterjovski 34'	Report	Buonavoglia 56'	Stadium: Sydney United Sports Centre; Attendance: 6,221; Referee: Matthew Breeze

17 October 1998 2	Marconi Stallions	2–0	Sydney United	Bossley Park, New South Wales
	Kim 49' (pen.); Maloney 66'	Report		Stadium: Marconi Stadium; Attendance: 8,752; Referee: Mark Shield

25 October 1998 3	Sydney United	4–1	Sydney Olympic	Edensor Park, New South Wales
	Townsend 3'; Eagleton 4'; Mitchell 26'; Sterjovski 70'	Report	Kalantzis 23'	Stadium: Sydney United Sports Centre; Attendance: 5,172; Referee: Gerry Connelly

1 November 1998 4	Perth Glory	3–1	Sydney United	Perth, Western Australia
	Halpin 4', 49'; Markovski 14'	Report	Sterjovski 42'	Stadium: Perth Oval; Attendance: 16,738; Referee: Eddie Lennie

8 November 1998 5	Sydney United	2–1	Carlton	Edensor Park, New South Wales
	Sterjovski 35'; Griffiths 66'	Report	Josifovski 67'	Stadium: Sydney United Sports Centre; Attendance: 3,116; Referee: Simon Micallef

15 November 1998 6	Melbourne Knights	0–1	Sydney United	Sunshine North, Victoria
		Report	Griffiths 24'	Stadium: Knights Stadium; Attendance: 3,548; Referee: Gerry Connolly

22 November 1998 7	Sydney United	2–1	Wollongong Wolves	Edensor Park, New South Wales
	Sterjovski 46', 77'	Report	Petrovski 72'	Stadium: Sydney United Sports Centre; Attendance: 4,026; Referee: B. Panella

29 November 1998 8	Adelaide City	3–2	Sydney United	Hindmarsh, South Australia
	Talladira 42'; Kim 45'; Hassell 74'	Report	Caleta 13'; Griffiths 48'	Stadium: Hindmarsh Stadium; Attendance: 2,300; Referee: Mark Shield

6 December 1998 9	Sydney United	1–0	Northern Spirit	Edensor Park, New South Wales
	Sterjovski 39'	Report		Stadium: Sydney United Sports Centre; Attendance: 6,236; Referee: Shaun Micallef

12 December 1998 10	Brisbane Strikers	2–2	Sydney United	Brisbane, Queensland
	Laybutt 30'; McLaren 48'	Report	Ardone 5'; Bennett 35'	Stadium: Suncorp Stadium; Attendance: 4,305; Referee: Matthew Breeze

11	Bye
	Report

27 December 1998 12	Sydney United	2–0	Canberra Cosmos	Edensor Park, New South Wales
	Sterjovski 15'; Ardone 44'	Report		Stadium: Sydney United Sports Centre; Attendance: 3,268; Referee: B. McKay

3 January 1999 13	South Melbourne	1–0	Sydney United	Albert Park, Victoria
	Coveny 50'	Report		Stadium: Bob Jane Stadium; Attendance: 6,416; Referee: Mark Shield

10 January 1999 14	Sydney United	4–0	Gippsland Falcons	Edensor Park, New South Wales
	Griffiths 5'; M.Santalab 24'; Sterjovski 75'; Day 85'	Report		Stadium: Sydney United Sports Centre; Attendance: 2,635; Referee: D. Dwight

17 January 1999 15	Adelaide Sharks	1–2	Sydney United	Hindmarsh, South Australia
	Poimer 46'	Report	M.Santalab 87'; Sterjovski 89'	Stadium: Hindmarsh Stadium; Attendance: 2,316; Referee: W. Dade

22 January 1999 16	Newcastle Breakers	0–1	Sydney United	Newcastle, New South Wales
		Report	Barrett 75'	Stadium: Breakers Stadium; Attendance: 3,687; Referee: D. Dwight

26 January 1999 17	Sydney United	3–2	Marconi Fairfield	Edensor Park, New South Wales
	Griffiths 41'; Sterjovski 41', 84' (pen.)	Report	C.Gibson 9', 50'	Stadium: Sydney United Sports Centre; Attendance: 6,498; Referee: Shaun Micallef

29 January 1999 18	Northern Spirit	1–2	Sydney United	North Sydney, New South Wales
	Marusic 68'	Report	Burns 44'; Griffiths 83'	Stadium: North Sydney Oval; Attendance: 17,024; Referee: G. Connelly

7 February 1999 19	Sydney United	1–1	Adelaide City	Edensor Park, New South Wales
	Sterjovski 17'	Report	Mori 28'	Stadium: Sydney United Sports Centre; Attendance: 4,018; Referee: Eugene Brazzale

14 February 1999 20	Sydney Olympic	2–1	Sydney United	Belmore, New South Wales
	Kalantzis 20'; Cardozo 39'	Report	Sterjovski 17'	Stadium: Belmore Sports Ground; Attendance: 5,107; Referee: Brett Hugo

21 February 1999 21	Sydney United	3–4	Perth Glory	Edensor Park, New South Wales
	Vrkic 16'; Sterjovski 23'; Berry 84'	Report	Boutsianis 38', 87'; Edwards 55'; Garcia 63'	Stadium: Sydney United Sports Centre; Attendance: 4,211; Referee: J. Blaney

28 February 1999 22	Carlton	1–3	Sydney United	Carlton North, Victoria
	Tricarico 48'	Report	Day 7', 46'; Plesa 44'	Stadium: Optus Oval; Attendance: 3,144; Referee: Mark Shield

7 March 1999 23	Sydney United	2–1	Melbourne Knights	Edensor Park, New South Wales
	Griffiths 34', 40'	Report	Kutlesovski 7'	Stadium: Sydney United Sports Centre; Attendance: 2,118; Referee: Gerry Connelly

14 March 1999 24	Wollongong Wolves	0–1	Sydney United	Fairy Meadow, New South Wales
		Report	Day 42'	Stadium: Brandon Park; Attendance: 3,518; Referee: Shaun Micallef

21 March 1999 25	Sydney United	4–3	Brisbane Strikers	Edensor Park, New South Wales
	Ardone 7'; Barrett 9'; Burns 55'; Berry 71'	Report	Harris 30'; Tollenaere 43'; McLaren 77'	Stadium: Sydney United Sports Centre; Attendance: 3,327; Referee: Eugene Brazzale

26	Bye
	Report

5 May 1999 27	Canberra Cosmos	1–4	Sydney United	Bruce, Australian Capital Territory
	Magnacca 65'	Report	Day 3', 48'; Kupresak 52'; Moric 88'	Stadium: Bruce Stadium; Attendance: 2,111; Referee: Matthew Breeze

11 April 1999 28	Sydney United	1–0	South Melbourne	Edensor Park, New South Wales
	Day 2'	Report		Stadium: Sydney United Sports Centre; Attendance: 4,321; Referee: Eddie Lennie

18 April 1999 29	Gippsland Falcons	0–0	Sydney United	Morwell, Victoria
		Report		Stadium: Mobil Park; Attendance: 2,013; Referee: J. Blaney

25 April 1999 30	Sydney United	3–1	Adelaide Sharks	Edensor Park, New South Wales
	Sterjovski 20', 29'; Burns 33'	Report	Demourtzidis 50'	Stadium: Sydney United Sports Centre; Attendance: 8,142; Referee: Eugene Brazzale

9 May 1999 Major Semi-Final - 1st Leg	South Melbourne	2–1	Sydney United	Albert Park, Victoria
	Curcija 44'; Coveny 54'	Report	Plesa 72'	Stadium: Bob Jane Stadium; Attendance: 10,691; Referee: Eddie Lennie

16 May 1999 Major Semi-Final - 2nd Leg	Sydney United	0–0	South Melbourne	Edensor Park, New South Wales
		Report		Stadium: Sydney United Sports Centre; Attendance: 11,579; Referee: Gerry Connelly

23 May 1999 Preliminary Final	Sydney United	2–1	Perth Glory	Bossley Park, New South Wales
	Sterjovski 13'; Berry 70'	Report	Boutsianis 83'	Stadium: Marconi Stadium; Attendance: 7,698; Referee: Mark Shield

30 May 1999 Grand Final	South Melbourne	3–2	Sydney United	Melbourne, Victoria
	Trimboli 53'; Anastasiadis 63', 87'	Report	Sterjovski 8'; Townsend 90+'	Stadium: Olympic Park; Attendance: 15,194; Referee: Shaun Micallef

== Statistics ==
=== Appearances and goals ===
Players with no appearances not included in the list.

No.	Pos.	Nat.	Name	National Soccer League		Final Series		Total					
No.	Pos.	Nat.	Name	1	GK	(Australia)	Andrew Crews	17	0	0	0	17	0
2	DF	(Australia)	David Barrett	25	2	4	0	29	2				
3	DF	(Croatia)	Velimir Kuprešak	25	1	4	0	29	1				
5	DF	(Australia)	Richard Pleša	27	1	4	1	31	2				
6	DF	(Australia)	Joe Vrkic	24	1	4	0	28	1				
7	MF	(Australia)	Jacob Burns	23	3	4	0	27	3				
8	MF	(Australia)	Walter Ardone	24	4	2	0	26	4				
9	FW	(Australia)	Mile Sterjovski	22	16	4	2	26	18				
10	FW	(Australia)	Nathan Day	16	7	4	0	20	7				
11	MF	(Australia)	Steve Berry	26	2	4	1	30	3				
13	MF	(Australia)	Joe Moric	2	0	0	0	2	0				
14	FW	(Australia)	Joe Caleta	15	1	0	0	15	1				
15	MF	(Australia)	Danny Townsend	22	1	4	1	26	2				
16	FW	(Australia)	Abbas Saad	1	0	0	0	1	0				
17	DF	(Australia)	Michael Santalab	21	2	3	0	24	2				
18	MF	(Australia)	Dave Mitchell	12	1	0	0	12	1				
19	FW	(Australia)	Joel Griffiths	24	8	4	0	28	8				
21	MF	(Australia)	Steve Eagleton	3	1	0	0	3	1				
24	MF	(Australia)	Robert Angievski	1	0	0	0	1	0				
25	DF	(Australia)	Ante Moric	8	1	1	0	9	1				
26	FW	(Australia)	Daniel Kukučka	2	0	0	0	2	0				
28	GK	(Australia)	Peter Bennett	26	1	4	0	30	1				
30	GK	(Australia)	Mike Gibson	11	0	4	0	15	0				
