= 1999–2000 Sydney United FC season =

Sydney United FC
1999–2000 season
- Chairman: Marko Franović
- Manager: David Ratcliffe / Ivan Petković
- Stadium: Sydney United Sports Centre
- National Soccer League: 16th (League)
- Shanghai International Football Tournament: Group Stage
- Top goalscorer: Mario Jermen, Aytek Genc, Nick Bosevski (3)
- Highest home attendance: 5,023 vs. Northern Spirit (4 October 1999); National Soccer League
- Lowest home attendance: 2,106 vs. Canberra Cosmos (12 March 2000); National Soccer League
- Average home league attendance: 3,745
- Biggest win: 2–0 vs. Sydney Olympic (16 January 2000); National Soccer League
- Biggest defeat: 0–3 vs. Adelaide Force (3 March 2000); National Soccer League; 0–3 vs. Parramatta Power (14 April 2000); National Soccer League

The 1999–2000 season saw Sydney United embark on its seventeenth season in the National Soccer League (NSL). They finished last, winning the wooden spoon for the first and only time in their NSL history.

The 1999–2000 season marked a transitional period for the club, as it embarked on a major rebuilding effort. The departure of Dave Mitchell, who had previously guided the team to a premiership and Grand Final appearance, had a profound impact on the club's fortunes. Mitchell's decision to join the newly established Parramatta Power franchise resulted in the loss of 16 key players, who opted to follow him to the new club. Notably, Captain Velimir Kuprešak demonstrated his commitment to Sydney United, remaining the sole player from the previous season's Grand Final squad to stay with the club.

David Ratcliffe was appointed as the new head coach, tasked with rebuilding the team from scratch. However, poor results led to his mid-season sacking, with assistant coach and former player Ivan Petković taking over the reins for the remainder of the season. Unfortunately, the team's struggles continued, and they finished the season with a disappointing last-place finish, managing only 5 wins from 34 games.

Despite the turmoil, Sydney United had been invited to participate in the Shanghai International Football Tournament during the pre-season, courtesy of their premiership win in the 1998–99 National Soccer League. However, despite an admirable effort, they were eliminated in the group stage, failing to advance further in the competition.

== Players ==
Note: Flags indicate national team as defined under FIFA eligibility rules; some limited exceptions apply. Players may hold more than one non-FIFA nationality.

No.	Pos.	Nation	Player
1	GK	AUS	John Crawley
2	DF	AUS	Raymond Younis
3	DF	AUS	Mark Racker
4	DF	AUS	Velimir Kuprešak (Captain)
5	DF	AUS	Eddy Bosnar
6	MF	AUS	Vince Savoca
7	MF	AUS	Mirko Jurilj
8	MF	AUS	Nahuel Arrarte
9	FW	AUS	Mario Jermen
10	MF	AUS	Ante Moric
11	MF	AUS	Tom Pondeljak
12	DF	AUS	Tom Maric
13	FW	AUS	Matthew Zec
14	MF	AUS	Kain Rastall

No.	Pos.	Nation	Player
15	MF	AUS	Aytek Genc
16	MF	AUS	Joe Moric
17	FW	AUS	Nick Bosevski
18	MF	AUS	Steven Bozinovski
19	MF	AUS	Grgo Saric
20	GK	AUS	Steve Tolios
21	FW	AUS	Zvonko Ušljebrka
22	MF	AUS	Colin Luff
23	MF	AUS	Terry Palapanis
24	MF	AUS	Andy Rakic
25	MF	AUS	Ante Deak
26	FW	AUS	Fernando Pelligrino
27	MF	AUS	Ante Deur
30	GK	AUS	Brett Hughes

=== Transfers in ===
No.	Pos.	Nat.	Name	Age	Moving from	Type	Transfer window	Ends	Transfer fee	Source
9	FW	(Australia)	Mario Jermen	24	NK Zadarkomerc (Croatia)	Transfer	Pre-season		Free	
11	MF	(Australia)	Tom Pondeljak	23	Melbourne Knights (Australia)	Transfer	Pre-season		Free	
25	MF	(Australia)	Ante Deak	21	Melbourne Knights (Australia)	Transfer	Pre-season		Free	
5	MF	(Australia)	Eddy Bosnar	19	Northern Spirit (Australia)	Transfer	Pre-season		Free	
15	MF	(Australia)	Aytek Genc	33	Johor FA (Malaysia)	Transfer	Pre-season		Free	
30	GK	(Australia)	Brett Hughes	30	Marconi Stallions (Australia)	Transfer	Pre-season		Free	
23	MF	(Australia)	Terry Palapanis	28	Marconi Stallions (Australia)	Transfer	Pre-season		Free	
7	MF	(Australia)	Mirko Jurilj	25	Jurong FC (Singapore)	Transfer	Pre-season		Free	
2	DF	(Australia)	Raymond Younis	23	Wollongong Wolves (Australia)	Transfer	Pre-season		Free	
22	MF	(Australia)	Colin Luff	24	Bonnyrigg White Eagles (Australia)	Transfer	Pre-season		Free	
3	MF	(Australia)	Mark Racker	22	Bonnyrigg White Eagles (Australia)	Transfer	Pre-season		Free	
14	MF	(Australia)	Kain Rastall	21	Macarthur Rams (Australia)	Transfer	Pre-season		Free	
1	GK	(Australia)	John Crawley	27	Macarthur Rams (Australia)	Transfer	Pre-season		Free	
21	FW	(Australia)	Zvonko Ušljebrka	26	Macarthur Rams (Australia)	Transfer	Pre-season		Free	
18	MF	(Australia)	Steven Bozinovski	18	Rockdale City Suns (Australia)	Transfer	Pre-season		Free	
13	FW	(Australia)	Matthew Zec	26	Fraser Park (Australia)	Transfer	Pre-season		Free	
17	FW	(Australia)	Nick Bosevski	22	Canterbury Marrickville FC (Australia)	Transfer	Pre-season		Free	
20	GK	(Australia)	Steve Tolios	24	Canterbury Marrickville FC (Australia)	Transfer	Pre-season		Free	
6	DF	(Australia)	Vince Savoca	24	Leichhardt Tigers (Australia)	Transfer	Pre-season		Free	
8	MF	(Australia)	Nahuel Arrarte	18	NSW Institute of Sport (Australia)	Transfer	Pre-season		Free	
26	FW	(Australia)	Fernando Pellegrino	19	Fairfield Bulls (Australia)	Transfer	Pre-season		Free	
19	MF	(Australia)	Grgo Saric	20	North Geelong Warriors (Australia)	Transfer	Pre-season		Free	

=== Transfers out ===
No.	Pos.	Nat.	Name	Age	Moving to	Type	Transfer window	Transfer fee	Source
10	FW	(Australia)	Nathan Day	25	Adelaide Force (Australia)	Transfer	Pre-season	Free	
24	MF	(Australia)	Robert Angievski	19	Newcastle Breakers (Australia)	End of Contract	Pre-season	Free	
16	FW	(Australia)	Abbas Saad	31	Northern Spirit (Australia)	End of Contract	Pre-season	Free	
5	MF	(Australia)	Richard Plesa	23	Parramatta Power (Australia)	End of Contract	Pre-season	Free	
9	FW	(Australia)	Mile Sterjovski	20	Parramatta Power (Australia)	End of Contract	Pre-season	Free	
19	FW	(Australia)	Joel Griffiths	20	Parramatta Power (Australia)	End of Contract	Pre-season	Free	
7	MF	(Australia)	Jacob Burns	21	Parramatta Power (Australia)	End of Contract	Pre-season	Free	
6	DF	(Australia)	Joe Vrkic	23	Parramatta Power (Australia)	End of Contract	Pre-season	Free	
2	DF	(Australia)	David Barrett	30	Parramatta Power (Australia)	End of Contract	Pre-season	Free	
8	MF	(Australia)	Walter Ardone	27	Parramatta Power (Australia)	End of Contract	Pre-season	Free	
30	GK	(Australia)	Michael Gibson	36	Parramatta Power (Australia)	End of Contract	Pre-season	Free	
1	GK	(Australia)	Andrew Crews	26	Parramatta Power (Australia)	Transfer	Pre-season	Free	
17	DF	(Australia)	Michael Santalab	20	Parramatta Power (Australia)	End of Contract	Pre-season	Free	
15	MF	(Australia)	Danny Townsend	25	Parramatta Power (Australia)	End of Contract	Pre-season	Free	
28	DF	(Australia)	Peter Bennett	29	Parramatta Power (Australia)	Transfer	Pre-season	Free	
11	MF	(Australia)	Steve Berry	31	Parramatta Power (Australia)	End of Contract	Pre-season	Free	
21	MF	(Australia)	Steve Eagleton	22	Parramatta Power (Australia)	End of Contract	Pre-season	Free	
26	FW	(Australia)	Daniel Kukucka	19	Parramatta Power (Australia)	End of Contract	Pre-season	Free	
20	GK	(Australia)	Barney Smith	21	Parramatta Power (Australia)	End of Contract	Pre-season	Free	
14	FW	(Australia)	Joe Caleta	33	retirement		Pre-season		
12	MF	(Australia)	Drew Laurence	20	Bentleigh Greens (Australia)	End of Contract	Pre-season	Free	

== Competitions ==
=== Overview ===
Competition	First match	Last match	Starting round	Final position	Record							
Competition	First match	Last match	Starting round	Final position	Pld	W	D	L	GF	GA	GD	Win %
National Soccer League	4 October 1999	7 May 2000	Matchday 1	16th	34	5	5	24	28	31	−3	14.71
Shanghai International Football Tournament	17 August 1999	24 August 1999	Group Stage	Group Stage	3	0	0	3	3	4	−1	0.00
Total					37	5	5	27	31	35	−4	13.51

Last updated: complete
Source: Competitions

=== National Soccer League ===
==== League table ====
Pos	Team	Pld	W	D	L	GF	GA	GD	Pts	Qualification
1	Perth Glory	34	19	7	8	60	42	+18	64	Qualification for the Finals series
2	Wollongong Wolves (C)	34	17	9	8	72	44	+28	60	Qualification for the Finals series and the Oceania Club Championship
3	Carlton	34	17	7	10	55	39	+16	58	Qualification for the Finals series
4	Adelaide Force	34	16	8	10	57	37	+20	56	Qualification for the Finals series
5	Sydney Olympic	34	16	7	11	56	40	+16	55	Qualification for the Finals series
6	Marconi Fairfield	34	16	7	11	53	49	+4	55	Qualification for the Finals series
7	Newcastle Breakers	34	14	9	11	44	44	0	51	
8	Auckland Kingz	34	15	5	14	57	59	−2	50	
9	Brisbane Strikers	34	13	10	11	46	40	+6	49	
10	South Melbourne	34	14	7	13	55	51	+4	49	
11	Parramatta Power	34	14	5	15	52	47	+5	47	
12	Melbourne Knights	34	13	6	15	44	57	−13	45	
13	Northern Spirit	34	11	3	20	41	58	−17	36	
14	Canberra Cosmos	34	9	9	16	44	64	−20	36	
15	Gippsland Falcons	34	7	8	19	23	49	−26	29	
16	Sydney United	34	5	5	24	19	58	−39	20	

Source: rsssf.com
Rules for classification: 1) points; 2) goal difference; 3) number of goals scored.
(C) Champions

==== Results summary ====
Overall								Home						Away					
Pld	W	D	L	GF	GA	GD	Pts	W	D	L	GF	GA	GD	W	D	L	GF	GA	GD
34	5	5	24	19	58	−39	20	5	3	9	15	22	−7	0	2	15	4	36	−32

==== Matches ====
4 October 1999 1	Sydney United	0–2	Northern Spirit	Edensor Park, New South Wales
		Report	Slater 53'; Seal 60'	Stadium: Sydney United Sports Centre; Attendance: 5,023; Referee: Mark Shield

10 October 1999 2	Sydney United	2–1	Football Kingz	Edensor Park, New South Wales
	Jermen 18', 46'	Report	de Jong 33'	Stadium: Sydney United Sports Centre; Attendance: 3,136; Referee: Brett Hugo

16 October 1999 3	Gippsland Falcons	1–1	Sydney United	Morwell, Victoria
	Fak 78'	Report	A.Moric 60'	Stadium: Falcons Park; Attendance: 1,953; Referee: Con Diomis

24 October 1999 4	Sydney United	1–2	Marconi Fairfield	Edensor Park, New South Wales
	Longo (og) 19'	Report	Maloney 62'; Savoca (og) 66'	Stadium: Sydney Croatian Sports Centre; Attendance: 3,036; Referee: Mark Shield

31 October 1999 5	Melbourne Knights	1–0	Sydney United	Sunshine North, Victoria
	Trupkovic 37'	Report		Stadium: Knights Stadium; Attendance: 3,197; Referee: D.Dwight

7 November 1999 6	Sydney United	1–0	Adelaide Force	Edensor Park, New South Wales
	Arrarte 30'	Report		Stadium: Sydney United Sports Centre; Attendance: 3,987; Referee: J.Blaney

15 November 1999 7	Canberra Cosmos	3–0	Sydney United	Bruce, Australian Capital Territory
	Milin 12', 41'; Watkins 51'	Report		Stadium: Bruce Stadium; Attendance: 2,404; Referee: Con Diomis

21 November 1999 8	Sydney United	0–0	Brisbane Strikers	Edensor Park, New South Wales
		Report		Stadium: Sydney Croatian Sports Centre; Attendance: 2,835; Referee: G.Connelly

26 November 1999 9	Parramatta Power	1–1	Sydney United	Parramatta, New South Wales
	Berry 62'	Report	Pondeljak 68'	Stadium: Parramatta Stadium; Attendance: 6,015; Referee: Eddie Lennie

5 December 1999 10	Sydney United	0–1	Perth Glory	Edensor Park, New South Wales
		Report	Despotovski 48'	Stadium: Sydney Croatian Sports Centre; Attendance: 4,480; Referee: J.Blaney

10 December 1999 11	Carlton	3–1	Sydney United	Melbourne, Victoria
	Moreira 9'; Markovski 36', 43'	Report	Younis 90'	Stadium: Olympic Park; Attendance: 2,793; Referee: D.Dwight

19 December 1999 12	Sydney United	1–2	Parramatta Power	Edensor Park, New South Wales
	Bosevski 69'	Report	Eagleton 18'; Sterjovski 56'	Stadium: Sydney United Sports Centre; Attendance: 4,565; Referee: Matthew Breeze

28 December 1999 13	Sydney United	0–2	South Melbourne	Edensor Park, New South Wales
		Report	Curcija 60'; Coveny 66'	Stadium: Sydney Croatian Sports Centre; Attendance: 2,179; Referee: D.Dwight

2 January 2000 14	Newcastle Breakers	1–0	Sydney United	Newcastle, New South Wales
	Moore 2'	Report		Stadium: Breakers Stadium; Attendance: 6,816; Referee: D.Dwight

7 January 2000 15	Northern Spirit	3–0	Sydney United	North Sydney, New South Wales
	Cunico 16'; Seal 47'; Langdan 67'	Report		Stadium: North Sydney Oval; Attendance: 11,772; Referee: Shaun Micallef

16 January 2000 16	Sydney United	2–0	Sydney Olympic	Edensor Park, New South Wales
	Bosevski 67'; Genc 90'	Report		Stadium: Sydney Croatian Sports Centre; Attendance: 4,622; Referee: Eddie Lennie

23 January 2000 17	Wollongong Wolves	1–0	Sydney United	Fairy Meadow, New South Wales
	Petrovski 8'	Report		Stadium: Brandon Park; Attendance: 5,842; Referee: Con Diomis

26 January 2000 18	Sydney United	2–5	Wollongong Wolves	Edensor Park, New South Wales
	E.Bosnar 10'; Maric 78'	Report	Young 3', 11'; Horsley 71'; Masi 85'; Chipperfield 88'	Stadium: Sydney Croatian Sports Centre; Attendance: 3,112; Referee: Matthew Breeze

30 January 2000 19	Sydney United	1–1	Melbourne Knights	Edensor Park, New South Wales
	Usljebrka 2'	Report	A.Cervinski 89'	Stadium: Sydney Croatian Sports Centre; Attendance: 3,098; Referee: Eddie Lennie

4 February 2000 20	Football Kingz	1–0	Sydney United	Auckland,New Zealand
	Vicelich 51'	Report		Stadium: North Harbour Stadium; Attendance: 3,687; Referee: C.Diomis

13 February 2000 21	Sydney United	0–1	Gippsland Falcons	Edensor Park, New South Wales
		Report	MacNichol 16'	Stadium: Sydney United Sports Centre; Attendance: 2,491; Referee: J.Blaney

20 February 2000 22	Marconi Stallions	2–0	Sydney United	Bossley Park, New South Wales
	McDonald 67'; Karl 80'	Report		Stadium: Marconi Stadium; Attendance: 6,120; Referee: G.Connolly

27 February 2000 23	Sydney United	1–2	Melbourne Knights	Edensor Park, New South Wales
	Bosevski 83'	Report	Reda 52'; Urlovic 82'	Stadium: Sydney Croatian Sports Centre; Attendance: 2,223; Referee: Brett Hugo

3 March 2000 24	Adelaide Force	4–0	Sydney United	Hindmarsh, South Australia
	Mori 12', 80'; Vidmar 40'; Kemp 45'	Report		Stadium: Hindmarsh Stadium; Attendance: 4,356; Referee: J.Blaney

12 March 2000 25	Sydney United	1–1	Canberra Cosmos	Edensor Park, New South Wales
	Jermen 86'	Report	Polak 53'	Stadium: Sydney United Sports Centre; Attendance: 2,106; Referee: Brett Hugo

18 March 2000 26	Brisbane Strikers	1–0	Sydney United	Brisbane, Queensland
	Kupresak (og) 57'	Report		Stadium: Suncorp Stadium; Attendance: 1,706; Referee: Matthew Breeze

26 March 2000 27	Sydney United	1–0	Parramatta Power	Edensor Park, New South Wales
	Pondeljak 89'	Report		Stadium: Sydney United Sports Centre; Attendance: 3,467; Referee: G.Connolly

2 April 2000 28	Perth Glory	2–0	Sydney United	Perth, Western Australia
	Edwards 18'; Ergic 85'	Report		Stadium: Perth Oval; Attendance: 10,275; Referee: Eddie Lennie

9 April 2000 29	Sydney United	1–2	Carlton	Edensor Park, New South Wales
	Genc 48'	Report	McPherson 7'; Marth 55'	Stadium: Sydney United Sports Centre; Attendance: 2,938; Referee: Con Diomis

14 April 2000 30	Parramatta Power	4–0	Sydney United	Parramatta, New South Wales
	Angelucci 4'; Ardone 27', 44'; Elrich 88'	Report		Stadium: Parramatta Stadium; Attendance: 3,361; Referee: Brett Hugo

22 April 2000 31	South Melbourne	1–0	Sydney United	Albert Park, Victoria
	Kupresak (og) 54'	Report		Stadium: Bob Jane Stadium; Attendance: 4,126; Referee: P.Mur

25 April 2000 32	Sydney United	1–0	Newcastle Breakers	Edensor Park, New South Wales
	Maric 16'	Report		Stadium: Sydney United Sports Centre; Attendance: 2,876; Referee: Mark Shield

30 April 2000 33	Melbourne Knights	4–1	Sydney United	Sunshine North, Victoria
	Rados 9'; A.Cervinski 39'; Kupresak (og) 58'; Urlovic 59'	Report	Genc 63'	Stadium: Knights Stadium; Attendance: 2,103; Referee: Brett Hugo

7 May 2000 34	Sydney Olympic	3–0	Sydney United	Belmore, New South Wales
	Cardozo 72'; Emerton 86'; Carle 87'	Report		Stadium: Belmore Sports Ground; Attendance: 5,233; Referee: G.Connolly

=== Shanghai International Football Tournament ===
==== Matches ====
17 August 1999 Group Stage	Uruguay SDP XI	1–1 (4–3 pens)	Sydney United	Shanghai, China
	G.López 20'	Report	Arrarte 17'

21 August 1999 Group Stage	Yokohama FC	2–1	Sydney United	Shanghai, China
		Report	Bosnar ?'

24 August 1999 Group Stage	Shanghai Shenhua	1–1 (Shanghai Shenhua won on pens)	Sydney United	Shanghai, China
		Report

== Statistics ==
=== Appearances and goals ===
Players with no appearances not included in the list.

No.	Pos.	Nat.	Name	National Soccer League		Shanghai International Football Tournament		Total	
No.	Pos.	Nat.	Name	Apps	Goals	Apps	Goals	Apps	Goals
1	GK	(Australia)	John Crawley	4	0	1	0	5	0
2	DF	(Australia)	Raymond Younis	14	1	0	0	14	1
3	DF	(Australia)	Mark Racker	5	0	0	0	5	0
4	DF	(Australia)	Velimir Kuprešak	21	0	1	0	22	0
5	DF	(Australia)	Eddy Bosnar	27	1	2	1	29	2
6	MF	(Australia)	Vince Savoca	23	0	1	0	24	0
7	MF	(Australia)	Mirko Jurilj	12	0	1	0	13	0
8	MF	(Australia)	Nahuel Arrarte	27	1	1	1	28	2
9	FW	(Australia)	Mario Jermen	20	3	0	0	20	3
10	MF	(Australia)	Ante Moric	22	1	1	0	23	1
11	MF	(Australia)	Tom Pondeljak	24	2	1	0	25	2
12	DF	(Australia)	Tom Maric	24	2	0	0	24	2
13	FW	(Australia)	Matthew Zec	12	0	0	0	12	0
14	MF	(Australia)	Kain Rastall	28	0	1	0	29	0
15	MF	(Australia)	Aytek Genc	25	3	0	0	25	3
16	MF	(Australia)	Joe Moric	24	0	1	0	25	0
17	FW	(Australia)	Nick Bosevski	26	3	1	0	27	3
18	MF	(Australia)	Steven Bozinovski	16	0	0	0	16	0
19	MF	(Australia)	Grgo Saric	9	0	0	0	9	0
20	GK	(Australia)	Steve Tolios	8	0	0	0	8	0
21	FW	(Australia)	Zvonko Ušljebrka	13	1	0	0	13	1
22	MF	(Australia)	Colin Luff	3	0	0	0	3	0
23	MF	(Australia)	Terry Palapanis	17	0	0	0	17	0
24	MF	(Australia)	Andy Rakic	10	0	0	0	10	0
25	MF	(Australia)	Ante Deak	6	0	0	0	6	0
26	FW	(Australia)	Fernando Pellegrino	3	0	0	0	3	0
27	MF	(Australia)	Ante Deur	6	0	0	0	6	0
30	GK	(Australia)	Brett Hughes	22	0	0	0	22	1
Players who left during the pre-season or were on trial with the club
—	FW	(Australia)	Nathan Day	0	0	1	0	1	0
—	MF	(Australia)	David Reid	0	0	1	0	1	0
—	MF	(Australia)	Stewart Van Bentum	0	0	1	0	1	0
