= List of Parramatta Power SC players =

Parramatta Power Soccer Club, an association football club based in Parramatta, Sydney, was founded in 1999. They were admitted into the National Soccer League for the 1999–2000 season. They dissolved in 2004 as the National Soccer League became defunct.

Ahmad Elrich held the record for the greatest number of appearances for Parramatta Power. The Australian midfielder played 120 times for the club. The club's goalscoring record was held by John Buonavoglia who scored 23 goals.

== Key ==
- The list is ordered first by date of debut, and then if necessary in alphabetical order.
- Appearances as a substitute are included.

Positions key
GK	Goalkeeper
DF	Defender
MF	Midfielder
FW	Forward

Nationality
Unless otherwise noted, the nationality of a player is determined by the country/countries which he has played for, or if said person has not played international football, their country of birth.
Club career
Club career is defined as the first and last calendar years in which the player appeared for the club in any of the competitions listed below.
Total appearances and Total goals
Total appearances and goals comprise those in the National Soccer League.

== Players ==
List of Parramatta Power SC players
Player	Nationality	Pos	Club career	Starts	Subs	Total	Goals
Player	Nationality	Pos	Club career	Appearances			Goals
Jon Angelucci	Australia	FW	1999–2000	11	11	22	5
Walter Ardone	Australia	MF	1999–2001	32	5	37	4
Peter Bennett	Australia	MF	1999–2002	53	10	63	5
Milan Blagojevic	Australia	DF	1999–2001	42	1	43	3
Jacob Burns	Australia	MF	1999–2000	24	1	25	3
Andrew Crews	Australia	GK	1999–2001	35	0	35	0
Steve Eagleton	Australia	MF	1999–2002	49	11	60	2
John Gibson	Australia	MF	1999–2000	17	10	27	2
Joel Griffiths	Australia	FW	1999–2001	38	13	51	15
Richard Plesa	Australia	DF	1999–2000	17	1	18	0
Michael Santalab	Australia	DF	1999–2001	24	6	30	2
Mile Sterjovski	Australia	MF	1999–2000	29	2	31	11
Danny Townsend	Australia	MF	1999–2000	1	21	22	2
Joe Vrkic	Australia	DF	1999–2003	48	6	54	1
Steve Berry	Australia	MF	1999–2001	37	15	50	3
Ahmad Elrich	Australia	MF	1999–2004	110	10	120	19
David Barrett	Australia	DF	1999–2002	60	4	64	2
Lachlan Campbell	Australia	MF	1999–2000	1	2	3	0
Mark Byrnes	Australia	DF	1999–2000	21	1	22	2
Matt Thompson	Australia	MF	1999–2004	58	35	93	8
Michael Gibson	Australia	GK	2000	13	0	13	0
Stephen Laybutt	Australia	DF	2000	6	1	7	1
Daniel Kukucka	Australia	FW	2000	1	2	3	0
Luke Roodenburg	Australia	FW	2000–2002	12	9	21	5
Kimon Taliadoros	Australia	FW	2000–2001	2	4	6	1
Barney Smith	Australia	GK	2000	2	0	2	0
Patrick Gatt	Australia	DF	2000	1	0	1	0
Andrew Clark	Australia	DF	2000–2001	8	9	17	0
Joe Miller	Scotland	FW	2000–2001	18	6	24	9
Nick Orlic	Australia	DF	2000–2003	54	3	57	2
Les Pogliacomi	Australia	GK	2000–2002	27	0	27	0
Hamilton Thorp	Australia	FW	2000–2001	5	5	10	2
Alex Tobin	Australia	DF	2000–2002	48	0	48	4
Brendon Santalab	Australia	FW	2000–2001	4	4	8	1
David Lee	England	DF	2000–2001	9	2	11	2
Damien Brown	Australia	MF	2000–2003	46	7	53	5
Brett Holman	Australia	FW	2001–2002	5	7	12	5
Matthew Biggins	Australia	FW	2001	0	1	1	0
Liam Reddy	Australia	GK	2001–2003	31	1	32	0
Michael Brown	Australia	MF	2001–2002	0	3	3	0
John Buonavoglia	Australia	FW	2001–2003	50	9	59	23
Steve Fitzsimmons	Australia	MF	2001–2002	12	6	18	1
Lubomir Lapsansky	Australia	MF	2001–2002	15	1	16	0
Wayne O'Sullivan	Republic of Ireland	MF	2001–2003	54	1	55	2
Pedj Bojic	Australia	DF	2001–2002	0	3	3	0
Mark Hagger	Australia	FW	2001	0	1	1	0
Matthew Langdon	Australia	MF	2001–2003	14	15	34	1
Zlatko Arambasic	Australia	FW	2001–2002	11	1	12	3
Steve Martin	Australia	MF	2001	1	1	2	0
Adam Kwasnik	Australia	FW	2001–2002	3	7	10	3
Bradley Groves	Australia	MF	2002	0	2	2	0
Royce Brownlie	Australia	FW	2002–2003	4	12	16	1
Alvin Ceccoli	Australia	DF	2002–2004	53	1	54	2
Brendan Renaud	Australia	MF	2002–2003	24	8	32	2
Kostas Salapasidis	Australia	FW	2002–2003	30	1	31	9
Jacek Sobczyk	Australia	DF	2002–2004	16	16	32	0
Ray Younis	Australia	MF	2002–2004	2	7	9	0
Peter Zorbas	Australia	MF	2002–2004	30	26	56	4
Michael Beauchamp	Australia	DF	2002–2004	57	0	57	0
Andrew Carman	Australia	GK	2002	0	1	1	0
Danny Vukovic	Australia	GK	2002–2003	5	0	5	0
Brad Maloney	Australia	MF	2002–2003	17	6	23	5
Paul O'Grady	Australia	DF	2003–2004	28	7	35	4
Clint Bolton	Australia	GK	2003–2004	27	0	27	0
Simon Colosimo	Australia	MF	2003–2004	23	0	23	1
Travis Dodd	Australia	MF	2003–2004	18	9	27	6
Andrew Durante	Australia	DF	2003	5	0	5	0
Andre Gumprecht	Germany	MF	2003–2004	25	0	25	2
Ante Milicic	Australia	FW	2003–2004	26	0	26	20
Fernando Rech	Brazil	FW	2003–2004	18	3	21	9
Lucas Pantelis	Australia	MF	2003–2004	16	7	23	3
Sasho Petrovski	Australia	FW	2003–2004	11	4	15	7
Naum Sekulovski	Australia	MF	2003–2004	0	4	4	1
Mark Bridge	Australia	FW	2004	0	5	5	0
