= 1999–2000 Newcastle Breakers FC season =

Newcastle Breakers
1999–2000 season
- Manager: Lee Sterrey
- National Soccer League: 7th
- Top goalscorer: John Buonavoglia (16)
- Highest home attendance: 7,674 vs. Adelaide Force (21 January 2000); National Soccer League
- Lowest home attendance: 3,831 vs. Canberra Cosmos (28 March 2000); National Soccer League
- Average home league attendance: 5,550
- Biggest win: 4–1 vs. Northern Spirit (11 February 2000); National Soccer League
- Biggest defeat: 0–4 vs. South Melbourne (7 May 2000); National Soccer League

The 1999–2000 season was the eighth and final season in the history of Newcastle Breakers. It was also the eighth and final season in the National Soccer League.

== Players ==
Note: Flags indicate national team as defined under FIFA eligibility rules; some limited exceptions apply. Players may hold more than one non-FIFA nationality.

No.	Pos.	Nation	Player
1	GK	ENG	Bob Catlin
2	DF	AUS	Shane Pryce
3	DF	AUS	Andy Roberts
4	DF	AUS	Adam Sanderson
5	DF	AUS	Todd McManus
6	MF	AUS	Glenn Sprod
7	FW	AUS	Travis Dodd
8	MF	AUS	Mark Wilson
9	FW	AUS	Chris Tanchevski
10	FW	AUS	John Buonavoglia
11	FW	AUS	Luke Tomich
12	MF	AUS	Robert Angievski

No.	Pos.	Nation	Player
13	FW	AUS	Brad Wieczorek
14	MF	AUS	Greg Owens
15	DF	AUS	Joshua Ferguson
16	MF	AUS	Vasko Trpcevski
17	DF	AUS	Paul Wheeler
18	FW	AUS	Andy Harper
19	FW	AUS	Chad Mansley
20	GK	AUS	Brad Swancott
21	FW	AUS	Peter Juchniewicz
22	DF	AUS	Glenn Moore
23	MF	AUS	Damien Smith

== Competitions ==
=== Overview ===
Competition	First match	Last match	Starting round	Final position	Record							
Competition	First match	Last match	Starting round	Final position	Pld	W	D	L	GF	GA	GD	Win %
National Soccer League	3 October 1999	7 May 2000	Matchday 1	7th	34	14	9	11	44	44	+0	41.18
Total					34	14	9	11	44	44	+0	41.18

Last updated: complete
Source: Competitions

=== National Soccer League ===
==== League table ====
Pos	Team	Pld	W	D	L	GF	GA	GD	Pts	Qualification
1	Perth Glory	34	19	7	8	60	42	+18	64	Qualification for the Finals series
2	Wollongong Wolves (C)	34	17	9	8	72	44	+28	60	Qualification for the Finals series and the Oceania Club Championship
3	Carlton	34	17	7	10	55	39	+16	58	Qualification for the Finals series
4	Adelaide Force	34	16	8	10	57	37	+20	56	Qualification for the Finals series
5	Sydney Olympic	34	16	7	11	56	40	+16	55	Qualification for the Finals series
6	Marconi Fairfield	34	16	7	11	53	49	+4	55	Qualification for the Finals series
7	Newcastle Breakers	34	14	9	11	44	44	0	51	
8	Auckland Kingz	34	15	5	14	57	59	−2	50	
9	Brisbane Strikers	34	13	10	11	46	40	+6	49	
10	South Melbourne	34	14	7	13	55	51	+4	49	
11	Parramatta Power	34	14	5	15	52	47	+5	47	
12	Melbourne Knights	34	13	6	15	44	57	−13	45	
13	Northern Spirit	34	11	3	20	41	58	−17	36	
14	Canberra Cosmos	34	9	9	16	44	64	−20	36	
15	Gippsland Falcons	34	7	8	19	23	49	−26	29	
16	Sydney United	34	5	5	24	19	58	−39	20	

Source: rsssf.com
Rules for classification: 1) points; 2) goal difference; 3) number of goals scored.
(C) Champions

==== Results summary ====
Overall								Home						Away					
Pld	W	D	L	GF	GA	GD	Pts	W	D	L	GF	GA	GD	W	D	L	GF	GA	GD
34	14	9	11	44	44	0	51	8	5	4	28	21	+7	6	4	7	16	23	−7

Source: worldfootball.net

==== Results by round ====
Round	1	2	3	4	5	6	7	8	9	10	11	12	13	14	15	16	17	18	19	20	21	22	23	24	25	26	27	28	29	30	31	32	33	34
Ground	A	H	A	H	A	H	A	H	A	H	A	H	A	H	H	H	H	A	A	A	H	A	H	A	H	A	H	A	H	A	H	A	H	A
Result	D	D	W	D	L	L	L	D	W	W	W	W	D	W	W	D	W	L	L	W	W	W	W	D	L	L	W	D	L	W	D	L	L	L
Position	7	11	5	6	7	11	12	12	11	8	7	7	6	6	6	5	4	4	6	4	4	3	3	4	4	4	4	5	6	4	5	6	7	7

Source: worldfootball.net
A = Away; H = Home; B = Bye; W = Win; D = Draw; L = Loss

==== Matches ====
3 October 1999 1	Sydney Olympic	2–2	Newcastle Breakers	Sydney
	Juric 17'; Kalantzis 44'	Report	M. Wilson 15'; Harper 71'	Stadium: Belmore Sports Ground; Attendance: 5,184; Referee: Jeremy Blaney

8 October 1999 2	Newcastle Breakers	2–2	Wollongong Wolves	Newcastle
	Pryce 36'; Buonavoglia 54'	Report	Masi 41'; Petrovski 88'	Stadium: Breakers Stadium; Attendance: 6,023; Referee: Simon Micallef

15 October 1999 3	Northern Spirit	0–2	Newcastle Breakers	Sydney
		Report	Owens 14'; Juchniewicz 89'	Stadium: North Sydney Oval; Attendance: 12,733; Referee: Matthew Breeze

22 October 1999 4	Newcastle Breakers	1–1	Football Kingz	Newcastle
	Buonavoglia 4'	Report	Rufer 82'	Stadium: Breakers Stadium; Attendance: 6,045; Referee: Con Diomis

31 October 1999 5	Gippsland Falcons	1–0	Newcastle Breakers	Morwell
	Gotis 26'	Report		Stadium: Falcons Park; Attendance: 1,813; Referee: Brett Hugo

5 November 1999 6	Newcastle Breakers	2–3	Marconi Fairfield	Newcastle
	Buonavoglia 63'; Dodd 65'	Report	S. Babic 14'; Trajanovski 65'; Invincible 84'	Stadium: Breakers Stadium; Attendance: 4,473; Referee: Matthew Breeze

14 November 1999 7	Melbourne Knights	3–0	Newcastle Breakers	Melbourne
	Kelic 55', 72'; Cervinski 87'	Report		Stadium: Knights Stadium; Attendance: 2,832; Referee: Jeremy Blaney

19 November 1999 8	Newcastle Breakers	1–1	Adelaide Force	Newcastle
	Pryce 22'	Report	Sabljak 11'	Stadium: Breakers Stadium; Attendance: 4,171; Referee: Con Diomis

26 November 1999 9	Canberra Cosmos	1–2	Newcastle Breakers	Canberra
	Polak 24'	Report	Harper 46'; Buonavoglia 61'	Stadium: Bruce Satdium; Attendance: 2,889; Referee: Matthew Breeze

3 December 1999 10	Newcastle Breakers	2–1	Brisbane Strikers	Newcastle
	Roberts 40'; Buonavoglia 57'	Report	Moore 50' (o.g.)	Stadium: Breakers Stadium; Attendance: 5,027; Referee: Brett Hugo

10 December 1999 11	Parramatta Power	0–1	Newcastle Breakers	Sydney
		Report	Bunoavoglia 62'	Stadium: Parramatta Stadium; Attendance: 4,004; Referee: Con Diomis

17 December 1999 12	Newcastle Breakers	3–2	Perth Glory	Newcastle
	Buonavoglia 19'; Pryce 24'; Dodd 44'	Report	Despotovski 28'; Halpin 34'	Stadium: Breakers Stadium; Attendance: 4,127; Referee: Con Diomis

28 December 1999 13	Carlton	0–0	Newcastle Breakers	Melbourne
		Report		Stadium: Olympic Park; Attendance: 3,098; Referee: Mark Shield

2 January 2000 14	Newcastle Breakers	1–0	Sydney United	Newcastle
	Moore 2'	Report		Stadium: Breakers Stadium; Attendance: 6,816; Referee: David Dwight

7 January 2000 15	Newcastle Breakers	3–2	Sydney Olympic	Newcastle
	Moore 18'; McManus 68'; Harper 70' (pen.)	Report	Mendez 33'; Macallister 78'	Stadium: Breakers Stadium; Attendance: 6,907; Referee: Matthew Breeze

14 January 2000 16	Newcastle Breakers	2–2	South Melbourne	Newcastle
	Harper 29', 38'	Report	Coveny 6'; Curcija 76'	Stadium: Breakers Stadium; Attendance: 4,448; Referee: Brett Hugo

21 January 2000 17	Newcastle Breakers	1–0	Adelaide Force	Newcastle
	Wieczorek 75'	Report		Stadium: Breakers Stadium; Attendance: 7,674; Referee: Simon Micallef

26 January 2000 18	Adelaide Force	2–0	Newcastle Breakers	Adelaide
	Kemp 6'; Pelosi 33'	Report		Stadium: Hindmarsh Stadium; Attendance: 3,895; Referee: Gerry Connolly

30 January 2000 19	South Melbourne	2–0	Newcastle Breakers	Melbourne
	Lozanovski 65'; Curcija 89'	Report		Stadium: Bob Jane Stadium; Attendance: 7,458; Referee: David Dwight

6 February 2000 20	Wollongong Wolves	1–2	Newcastle Breakers	Wollongong
	Chipperfield 7'	Report	Buonavoglia 60'; Owens 86'	Stadium: Brandon Park; Attendance: 4,438; Referee: Brett Hugo

11 February 2000 21	Newcastle Breakers	4–1	Northern Spirit	Newcastle
	Buonavoglia 35', 41'; Angievski 80'; Tanchevski 82'	Report		Stadium: Breakers Stadium; Attendance: 6,978; Referee: Gerry Connolly

19 February 2000 22	Football Kingz	0–1	Newcastle Breakers	Wellington
		Report	Wilson 67'	Stadium: Westpac Trust Stadium; Attendance: 8,000; Referee: Jeremy Blaney

25 February 2000 23	Newcastle Breakers	2–0	Gippsland Falcons	Newcastle
	Roberts 43'; Wieczorek 55'	Report		Stadium: Breakers Stadium; Attendance: 7,014; Referee: Con Diomis

5 March 2000 24	Marconi Fairfield	1–1	Newcastle Breakers	Sydney
	Catlin 82' (o.g.)	Report	Wilson 86'	Stadium: Marconi Stadium; Attendance: 3,409; Referee: Simon Micallef

10 March 2000 25	Newcastle Breakers	0–1	Melbourne Knights	Newcastle
		Report	Kelic 76'	Stadium: Breakers Stadium; Attendance: 4,591; Referee: Brian Precious

17 March 2000 26	Adelaide Force	2–1	Newcastle Breakers	Adelaide
	Pelosi 70', 90+1'	Report	Buonavoglia 31'	Stadium: Hindmarsh Stadium; Attendance: 4,198; Referee: Perry Mur

28 March 2000 27	Newcastle Breakers	3–2	Canberra Cosmos	Newcastle
	Buonavoglia 62', 87'; Milin 38' (o.g.)	Report	Roberts 18'; Purdue 23'	Stadium: Breakers Stadium; Attendance: 3,831; Referee: Matthew Breeze

1 April 2000 28	Brisbane Strikers	2–2	Newcastle Breakers	Brisbane
	Grierson 19'; North 41'	Report	Buonavoglia 61', 69'	Stadium: Suncorp Stadium; Attendance: 2,093; Referee: Gerry Connolly

7 April 2000 29	Newcastle Breakers	0–1	Parramatta Power	Newcastle
		Report	Griffiths 30' (pen.)	Stadium: Breakers Stadium; Attendance: 4,781; Referee: Brett Hugo

16 April 2000 30	Perth Glory	1–2	Newcastle Breakers	Perth
	Schwertz 68'	Report	Buonavoglia 20'; Harper 69'	Stadium: Perth Oval; Attendance: 11,003; Referee: Simon Micallef

22 April 2000 31	Newcastle Breakers	0–0	Carlton	Newcastle
		Report		Stadium: Breakers Stadium; Attendance: 5,735; Referee: Eddie Lennie

25 April 2000 32	Sydney United	1–0	Newcastle Breakers	Sydney
	Maric 16'	Report		Stadium: Sydney United Sports Centre; Attendance: 2,876; Referee: Mark Shield

28 April 2000 33	Newcastle Breakers	1–2	South Melbourne	Newcastle
	McManus 23'	Report	Clarkson 35'; Trimboli 60'	Stadium: Breakers Stadium; Attendance: 5,709; Referee: Simon Micallef

7 May 2000 34	South Melbourne	4–0	Newcastle Breakers	Melbourne
	Anastasiadis 4'; Trimboli 41'; Magnacca 80'; Curcija 88'	Report		Stadium: Bob Jane Stadium; Attendance: 5,011; Referee: Perry Mur

== Statistics ==
=== Appearances and goals ===
Players with no appearances not included in the list.

No.	Pos.	Nat.	Name	National Soccer League		Total	
No.	Pos.	Nat.	Name	Apps	Goals	Apps	Goals
1	GK	(England)	Bob Catlin	34	0	34	0
2	DF	(Australia)	Shane Pryce	32	3	32	3
3	DF	(Australia)	Andy Roberts	30(3)	2	33	2
5	DF	(Australia)	Todd McManus	33	2	33	2
6	MF	(Australia)	Glenn Sprod	33(1)	0	34	0
7	FW	(Australia)	Travis Dodd	28(4)	2	32	2
8	MF	(Australia)	Mark Wilson	32(1)	3	33	3
9	FW	(Australia)	Chris Tanchevski	2(21)	1	23	1
10	FW	(Australia)	John Buonavoglia	34	16	34	16
11	FW	(Australia)	Luke Tomich	2(7)	0	9	0
12	MF	(Australia)	Robert Angievski	2(8)	1	10	1
13	FW	(Australia)	Brad Wieczorek	25(1)	2	26	2
14	MF	(Australia)	Greg Owens	15(7)	2	22	2
15	DF	(Australia)	Joshua Ferguson	1	0	1	0
16	MF	(Australia)	Vasko Trpcevski	12(14)	0	26	0
18	FW	(Australia)	Andy Harper	31	6	31	6
19	FW	(Australia)	Chad Mansley	0(1)	0	1	0
21	FW	(Australia)	Peter Juchniewicz	3(8)	1	11	1
22	DF	(Australia)	Glenn Moore	23	2	23	2
23	MF	(Australia)	Damien Smith	2(19)	0	21	0

=== Clean sheets ===
Rank	No.	Pos	Nat	Name	National Soccer League	Total
1	1	GK	(England)	Bob Catlin	8	8
Total					8	8
