= List of Parramatta Power SC records and statistics =

Parramatta Power Soccer Club was an Australian semi-professional association football club based in Parramatta, Sydney. The club was formed in 1999 as they were admitted into the National Soccer League in the 1999–2000 season.

The list encompasses the honours won by Parramatta Power, records set by the club, their managers and their players. The player records section itemises the club's leading goalscorers and those who have made most appearances in the National Soccer League.

== Honours and achievements ==
- National Soccer League Premiership

Runners-up (1): 2003–04

- National Soccer League Championship

Runners-up (1): 2004

== Player records ==
=== Appearances ===
- Youngest first-team player: Michael Brown, 16 years, 254 days (against Northern Spirit, National Soccer League, 13 April 2001)
- Oldest first-team player: Michael Gibson, 37 years, 30 days (against South Melbourne, National Soccer League, 31 March 2000)

==== Most appearances ====
Competitive matches only, includes appearances as substitute. Numbers in brackets indicate goals scored.

Rank	Player	Years	Appearances
1	(Australia) Ahmad Elrich	1999–2004	120 (19)
2	(Australia) Matt Thompson	1999–2004	93 (8)
3	(Australia) David Barrett	1999–2002	64 (2)
4	(Australia) Peter Bennett	1999–2002	63 (5)
5	(Australia) Steve Eagleton	1999–2002	60 (2)
6	(Australia) John Buonavoglia	2001–2003	59 (23)
7	(Australia) Michael Beauchamp	2002–2004	57 (0)
7	(Australia) Nick Orlic	2000–2003	57 (2)
9	(Australia) Peter Zorbas	2002–2004	56 (4)
10	(Republic of Ireland) Wayne O'Sullivan	2001–2003	55 (2)

=== Goalscorers ===
- Most goals in a season: Ante Milicic, 20 goals (in the 2003–04 season)
- Youngest goalscorer: Brett Holman, 17 years, 305 days (against Newcastle United, National Soccer League, 26 January 2002)
- Oldest goalscorer: Alex Tobin, 36 years (against Sydney Olympic, National Soccer League, 3 November 2001)

==== Top goalscorers ====
Competitive matches only. Numbers in brackets indicate appearances made.

Rank	Player	Years	Goals
1	(Australia) John Buonavoglia	2001–2003	23 (59)
2	(Australia) Ante Milicic	2003–2004	20 (26)
3	(Australia) Ahmad Elrich	1999–2004	19 (120)
4	(Australia) Joel Griffiths	1999–2001	15 (51)
5	(Australia) Mile Sterjovski	1999–2000	11 (31)
6	(Scotland) Joe Miller	2000–2001	9 (24)
6	(Brazil) Fernando Rech	2003–2004	9 (21)
6	(Australia) Kostas Salapasidis	2003–2004	9 (31)
9	(Australia) Matt Thompson	1999–2004	8 (93)

== Managerial records ==
- First full-time manager: Dave Mitchell managed Parramatta Power from July 1999 to 2002
- Longest-serving manager: Dave Mitchell – 2 years, 230 days (1 July 1999 to 16 February 2002)

== Club records ==
=== Matches ===
- First match: Parramatta Power 1–1 Marconi Fairfield, National Soccer League, 1 October 1999
- Record win:
  - 7–0 against Football Kingz, National Soccer League, 15 February 2002
  - 7–0 against Marconi Fairfield, National Soccer League, 26 January 2003
- Record defeat: 1–6 against Perth Glory, National Soccer League, 3 May 2003
- Record consecutive wins: 5
  - from 1 December 2000 to 29 December 2000
  - from 1 March 2003 to 30 March 2003
- Record consecutive defeats: 5, from 5 January 2001 to 9 February 2001
- Record consecutive matches without a defeat: 6, from 26 November 2000 to 29 December 2000
- Record consecutive matches without a win: 6, from 5 January 2001 to 18 February 2001

=== Goals ===
- Most NSL goals scored in a season: 58 in 24 matches, 2003–04
- Fewest NSL goals scored in a season: 34 in 24 matches, 2001–02
- Most NSL goals conceded in a season: 47 in 34 matches, 1999–2000
- Fewest NSL goals conceded in a season: 27 in 24 matches, 2002–03

=== Points ===
- Most points in a season: 51 in 24 matches, 2003–04
- Fewest points in a season: 34 in 24 matches, 2001–02
