= 1997–98 Sydney United FC season =

Sydney United 58 FC
1997–1998 season
- Chairman: John Hewson
- Manager: Dave Mitchell
- Stadium: Parramatta Stadium
- National Soccer League: 4th (League); Elimination Final (Finals)
- Waratah Cup: Quarter-Final
- Top goalscorer: League = Abbas Saad (9); Overall = Abbas Saad (11)
- Highest home attendance: 10,768 vs. Marconi Fairfield (26 April 1998); NSL Elimination Final
- Lowest home attendance: 1,419 vs. Melbourne Knights (22 February 1998); National Soccer League
- Average home league attendance: 3,645
- Biggest win: 3–0 vs. UTS Olympic (16 December 1997); National Soccer League; 4–1 vs. Canberra Cosmos; National Soccer League; 3–0 vs. Brisbane Strikers; National Soccer League
- Biggest defeat: 0-3 vs. South Melbourne (14 January 1998); National Soccer League; 0–3 vs. Melbourne Knights (22 February 1998); National Soccer League

The 1997–98 season marked Sydney United's fifteenth campaign in the NSL. Following the departure of head coach Branko Culina to Canberra Cosmos, the club appointed former Socceroo Dave Mitchell as player-coach.

Despite a significant turnover in personnel—losing key players such as Zeljko Kalac (who returned mid-season after a failed move to Portsmouth), David Zdrilic, Ante Milicic, Ante Moric, Mark Babic, Robert Enes, and Krešimir Marušić—United responded by recruiting a number of seasoned professionals, including Robbie Hooker, David Barrett, Abbas Saad, Peter Bennett, and Stuart Munro.

Sydney United began the season strongly, losing just once in their opening sixteen matches. However, a late-season slump—triggered by a spate of injuries and suspensions—saw the team manage only a single win from their final eight games. Despite the downturn, United held on to finish fourth on the league table.

In the finals series, Sydney United faced local rivals Marconi Stallions, but were eliminated after consecutive 1–0 defeats.

Abbas Saad finished as the club's leading goalscorer, netting nine goals across the campaign.

The 1997–98 season was the only NSL campaign in which Sydney United did not host home matches at the Sydney United Sports Centre. Instead, the club played its entire home schedule at Parramatta Stadium, before returning to its traditional home base the following season, and has remained there ever since.

== Players ==
Note: Flags indicate national team as defined under FIFA eligibility rules; some limited exceptions apply. Players may hold more than one non-FIFA nationality.

| No. | Pos. | Nation | Player |
|---|---|---|---|
| 1 | GK | AUS | Josh Perosh |
| 2 | DF | AUS | David Barrett |
| 3 | DF | CRO | Velimir Kuprešak |
| 5 | DF | AUS | Richard Plesa |
| 6 | MF | AUS | Joe Vrkic |
| 7 | MF | AUS | Robbie Hooker |
| 8 | MF | ENG | Marcus Phillips |
| 9 | DF | AUS | Michael Santalab |
| 10 | FW | AUS | Abbas Saad |
| 11 | FW | AUS | Dave Mitchell |
| 12 | MF | BIH | Azur Mujanović |
| 13 | DF | SCO | Stuart Munro |
| 14 | MF | AUS | Joe Moric |
| 15 | MF | AUS | Jason Culina |
| 16 | MF | AUS | Dean Culina |

| No. | Pos. | Nation | Player |
|---|---|---|---|
| 17 | DF | AUS | Paul Bilokapic (Captain) |
| 18 | MF | AUS | Jacob Burns |
| 19 | FW | AUS | Tony Krslovic |
| 20 | GK | AUS | Andrew Crews |
| 21 | DF | AUS | Marko Rudan |
| 22 | FW | AUS | Mile Sterjovski |
| 23 | DF | AUS | Tom Maric |
| 24 | FW | AUS | Mario Jermen |
| 25 | DF | AUS | Dominic Ušalj |
| 26 | MF | CRO | Marjan Galić |
| 27 | FW | AUS | Nick Bosevski |
| 28 | MF | AUS | Peter Bennett |
| 30 | GK | AUS | Zeljko Kalac |
| — | MF | AUS | Steve Refenes |

=== Transfers in ===
| No. | Pos. | Nat. | Name | Age | Moving from | Type | Transfer window | Ends | Transfer fee | Source |
|---|---|---|---|---|---|---|---|---|---|---|
| 7 | MF | (Australia) | Robert Hooker | 30 | West Adelaide Sharks (Australia) | Transfer | Pre-season | | Undisclosed | |
| 2 | DF | (Australia) | David Barrett | 28 | Sydney Olympic (Australia) | Transfer | Pre-season | | Undisclosed | |
| 10 | FW | (Australia) | Abbas Saad | 28 | Sydney Olympic (Australia) | Transfer | Pre-season | | Undisclosed | |
| 11 | FW | (Australia) | Dave Mitchell | 35 | Sydney Olympic (Australia) | Transfer | Pre-season | | Free | |
| 14 | MF | (Australia) | Steve Refenes | 27 | Sydney Olympic (Australia) | Transfer | Pre-season | | Undisclosed | |
| 6 | DF | (Australia) | Joe Vrkic | 20 | Collingwood Warriors (Australia) | Loan return | Pre-season | | Free | |
| 8 | MF | (England) | Marcus Phillips | 23 | Oxford City (England) | Transfer | Pre-season | | Undisclosed | |
| 13 | DF | (Scotland) | Stuart Munro | 34 | Blacktown City (Australia) | Transfer | Pre-season | | Undisclosed | |
| 24 | FW | (Australia) | Mario Jermen | 20 | Wollongong City (Australia) | Transfer | Pre-season | | Undisclosed | |
| 27 | FW | (Australia) | Nick Bosevski | 20 | Marconi Fairfield (Australia) | Loan | Pre-season | | Undisclosed | |
| 28 | MF | (Australia) | Peter Bennett | 27 | Penrith City (Australia) | Transfer | Pre-season | | Undisclosed | |
| 12 | MF | (Bosnia and Herzegovina) | Azur Mujanović | 26 | Free agent | Transfer | Pre-season | | Free | |
| 26 | MF | (Croatia) | Marjan Galić | 29 | Free agent | Transfer | Pre-season | | Free | |

=== Transfers out ===
| No. | Pos. | Nat. | Name | Age | Moving to | Type | Transfer window | Transfer fee | Source |
|---|---|---|---|---|---|---|---|---|---|
| 14 | FW | (Australia) | David Zdrilic | 23 | FC Aarau (Switzerland) | Transfer | Pre-season | Undisclosed | |
| 13 | MF | (Australia) | Ante Milicic | 23 | NAC Breda (Netherlands) | Transfer | Pre-season | Undisclosed | |
| 8 | MF | (Australia) | Ante Moric | 23 | NK Zadar (Croatia) | Transfer | Pre-season | Undisclosed | |
| 11 | MF | (Croatia) | Krešimir Marušić | 28 | Carlton (Australia) | End of Contract | Pre-season | Undisclosed | |
| 22 | DF | (Australia) | Robert Trajkovski | 24 | Carlton (Australia) | End of Contract | Pre-season | Undisclosed | |
| 6 | MF | (Australia) | Robert Enes | 21 | Portsmouth (England) | End of Contract | Pre-season | Undisclosed | |
| 5 | DF | (Australia) | Mark Babic | 24 | Marconi Fairfield (Australia) | End of Contract | Pre-season | Undisclosed | |
| 23 | DF | (Australia) | Chad Gibson | 21 | Marconi Fairfield (Australia) | End of Contract | Pre-season | Undisclosed | |
| 12 | MF | (Australia) | Aytek Genc | 31 | Johor (Malaysia) | End of Contract | Pre-season | Undisclosed | |
| 9 | MF | (Australia) | Robert Markovac | 30 | Guangzhou Apollo (South Korea) | End of Contract | Pre-season | Free | |
| 20 | GK | (Australia) | Peter Blazincic | 28 | Guangzhou Apollo (South Korea) | End of Contract | Pre-season | Free | |
| 27 | FW | (Australia) | John Didulica | 22 | Melbourne Knights (Australia) | End of Contract | Pre-season | Free | |
| 7 | MF | (Croatia) | Damir Cvetko | 29 | retirement | End of Contract | Pre-season | Free | |
| 1 | GK | (Australia) | Zeljko Kalac | 24 | Free agent | End of Contract | Pre-season | Free | released to join Portsmouth but was unable to gain a work permit |
| 26 | DF | (Croatia) | Anthony Šerić | 18 | Hajduk Split (Croatia) | Transfer | Pre-season | Undisclosed | |
| | FW | (Australia) | James Aschner | 22 | Johor (Malaysia) | End of Contract | Pre-season | Free | |

=== Mid-Season Gains ===
| No. | Pos. | Nat. | Name | Age | Moving from | Type | Transfer window | Ends | Transfer fee | Source |
|---|---|---|---|---|---|---|---|---|---|---|
| 30 | GK | (Australia) | Zeljko Kalac | 24 | Free agent | Transfer | Mid-season | | Free | Returned after failed move to Portsmouth (work permit issue) |
| 22 | FW | (Australia) | Mile Sterjovski | 18 | AIS (Australia) | Transfer | Pre-season | | Free | |

== Competitions ==
=== Overview ===
| Competition | First match | Last match | Starting round | Final position | Record | | | | | | | |
| Competition | First match | Last match | Starting round | Final position | Pld | W | D | L | GF | GA | GD | Win % |
|---|---|---|---|---|---|---|---|---|---|---|---|---|
| National Soccer League | 8 October 1997 | 12 April 1998 | Matchday 1 | 4th | 26 | 11 | 10 | 5 | 37 | 26 | +11 | 42.31 |
| Final Series | 19 April 1998 | 26 April 1998 | Elimination Final | Elimination Final | 2 | 0 | 0 | 2 | 0 | 2 | −2 | 0.00 |
| Total | | | | | 28 | 11 | 10 | 7 | 37 | 28 | +9 | 39.29 |

Last updated: complete
Source: Competitions

=== National Soccer League ===
==== League table ====
| Pos | Team | Pld | W | D | L | GF | GA | GD | Pts | Qualification |
|---|---|---|---|---|---|---|---|---|---|---|
| 1 | South Melbourne (C) | 26 | 13 | 9 | 4 | 56 | 41 | +15 | 48 | Qualification for the Finals series |
| 2 | Carlton | 26 | 12 | 9 | 5 | 44 | 24 | +20 | 45 | Qualification for the Finals series |
| 3 | Adelaide City | 26 | 13 | 4 | 9 | 45 | 30 | +15 | 43 | Qualification for the Finals series |
| 4 | Sydney United | 26 | 11 | 10 | 5 | 37 | 26 | +11 | 43 | Qualification for the Finals series |
| 5 | Marconi Fairfield | 26 | 12 | 7 | 7 | 33 | 25 | +8 | 43 | Qualification for the Finals series |
| 6 | Wollongong Wolves | 26 | 13 | 3 | 10 | 51 | 33 | +18 | 42 | Qualification for the Finals series |
| 7 | Melbourne Knights | 26 | 11 | 6 | 9 | 37 | 35 | +2 | 39 | |
| 8 | Perth Glory | 26 | 10 | 6 | 10 | 35 | 40 | −5 | 36 | |
| 9 | UTS Olympic | 26 | 10 | 5 | 11 | 37 | 43 | −6 | 35 | |
| 10 | West Adelaide | 26 | 10 | 4 | 12 | 32 | 38 | −6 | 34 | |
| 11 | Gippsland Falcons | 26 | 8 | 7 | 11 | 28 | 36 | −8 | 31 | |
| 12 | Brisbane Strikers | 26 | 6 | 5 | 15 | 23 | 40 | −17 | 23 | |
| 13 | Newcastle Breakers | 26 | 4 | 9 | 13 | 30 | 50 | −20 | 21 | |
| 14 | Canberra Cosmos | 26 | 3 | 8 | 15 | 29 | 56 | −27 | 17 | |

Source: rsssf.com
Rules for classification: 1) points; 2) goal difference; 3) number of goals scored.
(C) Champions

==== Results summary ====
| Overall | | | | | | | | Home | | | | | | Away | | | | | |
| Pld | W | D | L | GF | GA | GD | Pts | W | D | L | GF | GA | GD | W | D | L | GF | GA | GD |
|---|---|---|---|---|---|---|---|---|---|---|---|---|---|---|---|---|---|---|---|
| 28 | 11 | 10 | 7 | 37 | 28 | +9 | 43 | 5 | 6 | 3 | 17 | 14 | +3 | 6 | 4 | 4 | 20 | 14 | +6 |

==== Matches ====
| 4 October 1997 1 | Canberra Cosmos | 1–3 | Sydney United | Queanbeyan, New South Wales |
| | Buljan 67' | Report | Saad 12'; Hooker 19'; Bilokapic 78' (pen.) | Stadium: Seiffert Oval; Attendance: 3,500; Referee: Con Diomis |

| 12 October 1997 2 | Carlton | 1–1 | Sydney United | Carlton North, Victoria |
| | Lapsansky 45' | Report | Burns 29' | Stadium: Optus Oval; Attendance: 4,297; Referee: Matthew Breeze |

| 19 October 1997 3 | Adelaide City | 0–2 | Sydney United | Norwood, South Australia |
| | | Report | Mitchell 24', 51' | Stadium: Norwood Oval; Attendance: 5,737; Referee: Eddie Lennie |

| 24 October 1997 4 | Sydney United | 2–1 | Brisbane Strikers | Parramatta, New South Wales |
| | Plesa 42'; Mitchell 56' | Report | Cranney 17' | Stadium: Parramatta Stadium; Attendance: 4,623; Referee: Brett Hugo |

| 2 November 1997 5 | Melbourne Knights | 0–0 | Sydney United | Sunshine North, Victoria |
| | | Report | | Stadium: Knights Stadium; Attendance: 4,502; Referee: Eugene Brazzale |

| 7 November 1997 6 | Sydney United | 2–0 | Newcastle Breakers | Parramatta, New South Wales |
| | Bilokapic 20' (pen.); Bosevski 25' | Report | | Stadium: Parramatta Stadium; Attendance: 3,656; Referee: D.Dwight |

| 16 November 1997 7 | UTS Olympic | 0–3 | Sydney United | Moore Park, New South Wales |
| | | Report | Saad 21', 33', 65' | Stadium: Sydney Football Stadium; Attendance: 5,641; Referee: Mark Shield |

| 23 November 1997 8 | Sydney United | 1–1 | Marconi Fairfield | Parramatta, New South Wales |
| | Bilokapic 10' | Report | Zoric 65' | Stadium: Parramatta Stadium; Attendance: 6,363; Referee: Shaun Micallef |

| 30 November 1997 9 | Adelaide Sharks | 1–2 | Sydney United | Torrensville, South Australia |
| | Cardozo 41' | Report | Mitchell 36'; Saad 63' | Stadium: Thebarton Oval; Attendance: 4,064; Referee: Eddie Lennie |

| 7 December 1997 10 | Sydney United | 1-1 | Gippsland Falcons | Parramatta, New South Wales |
| | Mitchell 18' | Report | Bell 46' | Stadium: Parramatta Stadium; Attendance: 3,878; Referee: Con Diomis |

| 14 December 1997 11 | South Melbourne | 3–0 | Sydney United | Albert Park, Victoria |
| | Anastasiadis 29', 57', 74' | Report | | Stadium: Lakeside Stadium; Attendance: 5,820; Referee: Mark Shield |

| 21 December 1997 12 | Sydney United | 2–1 | Wollongong Wolves | Parramatta, New South Wales |
| | Saad 21'; Burns 57' | Report | Masi 8' | Stadium: Parramatta Stadium; Attendance: 3,758; Referee: Mark Shield |

| 28 December 1997 13 | Perth Glory | 0–2 | Sydney United | Vincent, Western Australia |
| | | Report | Saad 37', 39' | Stadium: Perth Oval; Attendance: 17,764; Referee: Shaun Micallef |

| 4 January 1998 14 | Sydney United | 0–0 | Perth Glory | Parramatta, New South Wales |
| | | Report | | Stadium: Parramatta Stadium; Attendance: 5,532; Referee: Eddie Lennie |

| 11 January 1998 15 | Sydney United | 4–1 | Canberra Cosmos | Parramatta, New South Wales |
| | Bilokapic 22' (pen.), 90'; Wilson (og) 45'; Culina 53' | Report | | Stadium: Parramatta Stadium; Attendance: 3,878; Referee: Con Diomis |

| 18 January 1998 16 | Sydney United | 1–1 | Carlton | Parramatta, New South Wales |
| | Kupresak 48' | Report | Lapsansky 38' | Stadium: Parramatta Stadium; Attendance: 3,333; Referee: Brett Hugo |

| 25 January 1998 17 | Sydney United | 0–1 | Adelaide City | Parramatta, New South Wales |
| | | Report | Mori 44' | Stadium: Parramatta Stadium; Attendance: 3,355; Referee: Eddie Lennie |

| 31 January 1998 18 | Brisbane Strikers | 0–3 | Sydney United | Brisbane, Queensland |
| | | Report | Phillips 34'; Barrett 49'; Bosevski 80' | Stadium: Suncorp Stadium; Attendance: 4,008; Referee: J.Blaney |

| 22 February 1998 19 | Sydney United | 0–3 | Melbourne Knights | Parramatta, New South Wales |
| | | Report | Kelic 40'; Pondeljak 61', 67' (pen.) | Stadium: Parramatta Stadium; Attendance: 1,419; Referee: Mark Shields |

| 27 February 1998 20 | Newcastle Breakers | 3–1 | Sydney United | Birmingham Gardens, New South Wales |
| | Ironside 46'; Zane 48'; J.Bennett 85' | Report | Phillips 24' | Stadium: Topper Stadium; Attendance: 2,119; Referee: G.Leverton |

| 8 March 1998 21 | Sydney United | 2–1 | Adelaide Sharks | Parramatta, New South Wales |
| | Bilokapic 63' (pen.); Jermen 77' | Report | Artone 40' | Stadium: Parramatta Stadium; Attendance: 2,065; Referee: Eddie Lennie |

| 14 March 1998 22 | Marconi Fairfield | 1–0 | Sydney United | Bossley Park, New South Wales |
| | Renaud 67' | Report | | Stadium: Marconi Stadium; Attendance: 7,362; Referee: Gerry Connelly |

| 22 March 1998 23 | Sydney United | 0–0 | UTS Olympic | Parramatta, New South Wales |
| | | Report | | Stadium: Parramatta Stadium; Attendance: 2,895; Referee: Brett Hugo |

| 29 March 1998 24 | Gippsland Falcons | 1–1 | Sydney United | Gippsland, Victoria |
| | Osman 79' | Report | Saad 54' | Stadium: Falcons Park; Attendance: 1,477; Referee: Matthew Breeze |

| 5 April 1998 25 | Sydney United | 2–2 | South Melbourne | Parramatta, New South Wales |
| | Sterjovski 30'; Bennett 51' | Report | Anastasiadis 6'; Clarkson 78' | Stadium: Parramatta Stadium; Attendance: 2,626; Referee: Eddie Lennie |

| 12 April 1998 26 | Wollongong City | 2–2 | Sydney United | Fairy Meadow, New South Wales |
| | Ceccoli 19'; Horsley 59' | Report | Vrkic 83'; Sterjovski 89' | Stadium: Brandon Park; Attendance: 6,337; Referee: Mark Shield |

| 19 April 1998 Elimination Final - 1st Leg | Marconi Fairfield | 1–0 | Sydney United | Bossley Park, New South Wales |
| | Awaritefe 22' | Report | | Stadium: Marconi Stadium; Attendance: 10,113; Referee: Matthew Breeze |

| 26 April 1998 Elimination Final - 2nd Leg | Sydney United | 0–1 | Marconi Fairfield | Parramatta, New South Wales |
| | | Report | Awaritefe 71' | Stadium: Parramatta Stadium; Attendance: 10,768; Referee: Mark Shield |

==== Waratah Cup Matches ====
| 3 September 1997 Round 6 - Game 1 | Bankstown City Lions | 2–1 | Sydney United | South Granville, New South Wales |
| | Hawrysluk 33', 61' | Report | Saad 74' | Stadium: Melita Stadium |

| 7 September 1997 Round 6 - Game 2 | Sydney United | 7–1 | Mt. Pritchard | South Granville, New South Wales |
| | Bosevski 11'; Saad 36'; Krslovic 51' (?), 90'; Refenes 55'; Mitchell | Report | Bruni | Stadium: Melita Stadium |

| 10 September 1997 Round 6 - Game 3 | Sydney United | 1–0 | Bonnyrigg White Eagles | Lisarow, New South Wales |
| | J.Culina | Report | | Stadium: Pluim Park |

| 14 September 1997 Quarter-Final | Sydney United | 2–3 | Wollongong Wolves | Seven Hills, New South Wales |
| | Burns 50'; Bilokapic 80' | Report | Chipperfield 11' (?); Dimoski | Stadium: Gabbie Stadium |

== Statistics ==
=== Appearances and goals ===
Players with no appearances not included in the list.

| No. | Pos. | Nat. | Name | National Soccer League | | Final Series | | Waratah Cup | | Total | | | | | |
|---|---|---|---|---|---|---|---|---|---|---|---|---|---|---|---|
| No. | Pos. | Nat. | Name | 1 | GK | (Australia) | John Perosh | 0 | 0 | 0 | 0 | 4 | 0 | 4 | 0 |
| 2 | DF | (Australia) | David Barrett | 23 | 1 | 2 | 0 | 0 | 0 | 25 | 1 | | | | |
| 3 | DF | (Croatia) | Velimir Kuprešak | 22 | 1 | 2 | 0 | 1 | 0 | 25 | 1 | | | | |
| 5 | DF | (Australia) | Richard Plesa | 18 | 1 | 0 | 0 | 0 | 0 | 18 | 1 | | | | |
| 6 | DF | (Australia) | Joe Vrkic | 25 | 1 | 1 | 0 | 0 | 0 | 26 | 1 | | | | |
| 7 | DF | (Australia) | Robbie Hooker | 21 | 1 | 2 | 0 | 0 | 0 | 23 | 1 | | | | |
| 8 | MF | (England) | Marcus Phillips | 16 | 2 | 1 | 0 | 0 | 0 | 17 | 2 | | | | |
| 9 | DF | (Australia) | Michael Santalab | 2 | 0 | 0 | 0 | 0 | 0 | 2 | 0 | | | | |
| 10 | FW | (Australia) | Abbas Saad | 24 | 9 | 2 | 0 | 2 | 2 | 28 | 11 | | | | |
| 11 | FW | (Australia) | Dave Mitchell | 10 | 5 | 2 | 0 | 1 | 1 | 13 | 6 | | | | |
| 12 | DF | (Bosnia and Herzegovina) | Azur Mujanović | 7 | 0 | 0 | 0 | 0 | 0 | 7 | 0 | | | | |
| 13 | DF | (Scotland) | Stuart Munro | 19 | 0 | 2 | 0 | 0 | 0 | 21 | 0 | | | | |
| 14 | FW | (Australia) | Joe Moric | 3 | 0 | 0 | 0 | 0 | 0 | 3 | 0 | | | | |
| 15 | MF | (Australia) | Jason Culina | 18 | 1 | 2 | 0 | 1 | 1 | 21 | 2 | | | | |
| 16 | MF | (Australia) | Dean Culina | 0 | 0 | 0 | 0 | 1 | 0 | 1 | 0 | | | | |
| 17 | MF | (Australia) | Paul Bilokapic | 22 | 6 | 2 | 0 | 1 | 1 | 25 | 7 | | | | |
| 18 | MF | (Australia) | Jacob Burns | 23 | 2 | 2 | 0 | 3 | 1 | 28 | 3 | | | | |
| 19 | FW | (Australia) | Tony Krslovic | 1 | 0 | 0 | 0 | 2 | 3 | 3 | 3 | | | | |
| 20 | GK | (Australia) | Andrew Crews | 11 | 0 | 0 | 0 | 0 | 0 | 11 | 0 | | | | |
| 21 | DF | (Australia) | Marko Rudan | 7 | 0 | 1 | 0 | 0 | 0 | 8 | 0 | | | | |
| 22 | FW | (Australia) | Mile Sterjovski | 9 | 2 | 2 | 0 | 0 | 0 | 11 | 2 | | | | |
| 24 | FW | (Australia) | Mario Jermen | 11 | 1 | 0 | 0 | 0 | 0 | 11 | 1 | | | | |
| 25 | MF | (Australia) | Dominic Ušalj | 1 | 0 | 0 | 0 | 1 | 0 | 2 | 0 | | | | |
| 26 | MF | (Croatia) | Marin Galić | 4 | 0 | 0 | 0 | 0 | 0 | 4 | 0 | | | | |
| 27 | FW | (Australia) | Nick Bosevski | 18 | 2 | 0 | 0 | 2 | 1 | 20 | 3 | | | | |
| 28 | MF | (Australia) | Peter Bennett | 22 | 0 | 2 | 0 | 0 | 0 | 24 | 0 | | | | |
| 30 | GK | (Australia) | Zeljko Kalac | 15 | 0 | 2 | 0 | 0 | 0 | 17 | 0 | | | | |
| – | MF | (Australia) | Steve Refenes | 0 | 0 | 0 | 0 | 1 | 1 | 1 | 1 | | | | |
