= 1999 National Soccer League grand final =

1999 National Soccer League Grand Final
- Event: 1998–99 National Soccer League
South Melbourne	Sydney United
3	2
- Date: 30 May 1999
- Venue: Olympic Park Stadium, Melbourne, Australia
- Man of the Match: Goran Lozanovski (Joe Marston Medal)
- Referee: Simon Michallef
- Attendance: 15,194

The 1999 National Soccer League Grand Final, also known as the 1999 Ericsson Cup Grand Final, was held on 30 May 1999 between South Melbourne and Sydney United at Olympic Park Stadium. South Melbourne gained home advantage as although Sydney United finished higher in the regular season, South Melbourne won the major semi-final against them two weeks prior. Mile Sterjovski scored first for United as they went up 1–0 at the half time break, however, a goal from Paul Trimboli and a brace from John Anastasiadis sealed South Melbourne's second consecutive championship and fourth overall. Goran Lozanovski won the Joe Marston Medal.

== Background ==
Sydney United finished the season with the minor premiership through a 3–1 win over the Adelaide Sharks on the final day of the season. South Melbourne finished one point from first place.

== Route to the final ==
=== League Standings ===
Pos	Team	Pld	W	D	L	GF	GA	GD	Pts	Qualification or relegation
1	Sydney United	28	18	4	6	53	33	+20	58	1999 National Soccer League Finals
2	South Melbourne (C)	28	17	6	5	50	26	+24	57	1999 Oceania Club Championship
3	Perth Glory	28	16	5	7	62	37	+25	53	1999 National Soccer League Finals
4	Marconi Stallions	28	15	3	10	53	47	+6	48	1999 National Soccer League Finals
5	Northern Spirit	28	14	4	10	36	35	+1	46	1999 National Soccer League Finals
6	Adelaide City	28	13	6	9	39	26	+13	45	1999 National Soccer League Finals
7	Sydney Olympic	28	12	7	9	46	36	+10	43	
8	Newcastle Breakers	28	11	7	10	29	33	−4	40	
9	Brisbane Strikers	28	11	6	11	41	47	−6	39	
10	Wollongong Wolves	28	8	8	12	45	52	−7	32	
11	Carlton SC	28	9	4	15	47	47	0	31	
12	Melbourne Knights	28	8	5	15	32	43	−11	29	
13	West Adelaide (R)	28	7	6	15	36	46	−10	27	Disbanded at end of season
14	Gippsland Falcons	28	5	10	13	17	44	−27	25	
15	Canberra Cosmos	28	4	3	21	21	55	−34	15	

Updated to match(es) played on 25 April 1999. Source: rsssf.com
Rules for classification: 1) points; 2) goal difference; 3) number of goals scored.
(C) Champions; (R) Relegated

=== Finals Bracket ===
Elimination Finals
6	Adelaide City	0	1	1
3	Perth Glory	0	2	2
5	Northern Spirit	0	1	1
4	Marconi Stallions	0	2	2

Major/Minor Semifinals
9 & 16 May 1999
2	South Melbourne	2	0	2
1	Sydney United	1	0	1
15 May 1999
3	Perth Glory	1
4	Marconi Stallions	0

Preliminary Final
23 May 1999
1	Sydney United	2
3	Perth Glory	1

Grand Final
South Melbourne	3
Sydney United	2

== Match ==
=== Details ===
30 May 1999
15:15 AEST

South Melbourne	3 – 2	Sydney United
Trimboli 53'; Anastasiadis 63', 87'	Reports	Sterjovski 8'; Townsend 90+'

Olympic Park Stadium, Melbourne
Attendance: 15,194
Referee: Simon Michallef

GK	1	(Australia) Michael Petkovic
MF	2	(Australia) Steve Iosifidis
DF	3	(Australia) Fausto De Amicis
DF	4	(Australia) Nick Orlic
DF	5	(Australia) Con Blatsis
MF	6	(Australia) David Clarkson
MF	7	(Australia) Steve Panopoulos
FW	8	(New Zealand) Vaughan Coveny
FW	9	(Australia) Paul Trimboli (c)	(substituted off) 68'
FW	10	(Australia) Michael Curcija	(substituted off) 63'
MF	15	(Australia) Goran Lozanovski	(substituted off) 81'
Substitutes:
GK	20	(Australia) Chris Jones
FW	11	(Australia) John Anastasiadis	(substituted on) 63'
MF	16	(Australia) George Goutzioulis	(substituted on) 68'
FW	17	(Australia) Jim Tsekinis	(substituted on) 81'
DF	18	(Australia) Robert Liparoti
Manager:
(Australia) Ange Postecoglou
Joe Marston Medal:
Goran Lozanovski (South Melbourne)

GK	30	(Australia) Mike Gibson
DF	2	(Australia) David Barrett
DF	4	(Australia) Velimir Kupresak (c)
DF	5	(Australia) Richard Plesa
DF	6	(Australia) Joe Vrkic
MF	7	(Australia) Jacob Burns	(substituted off) 88'
FW	9	(Australia) Mile Sterjovski
FW	10	(Australia) Nathan Day	(substituted off) 64'
MF	11	(Australia) Steve Berry
DF	17	(Australia) Michael Santalab	(substituted off) 68'
MF	28	(Australia) Peter Bennett
Substitutes:
GK	20	(Australia) Barney Smith
DF	8	(Australia) Walter Ardone	(substituted on) 88'
MF	15	(Australia) Danny Townsend	(substituted on) 68'
FW	19	(Australia) Joel Griffiths	(substituted on) 64'
MF	25	(Australia) Ante Moric
Manager:
(Australia) David Mitchell

Assistant referees:
Fourth official:

Match rules

- 90 minutes.
- 30 minutes of extra time if necessary.
- Penalty shoot-out if scores still level.

== Post-match ==
The match served as a qualifier for the 1999 Oceania Club Championship. South Melbourne qualified easily for the championship final, conceding just one goal in the group stage and defeating Tahitian club A.S. Vénus 3–0 in the semifinal. They qualified for the 2000 FIFA Club World Championship with a 5–0 win in the final. At the Club World Championship, South Melbourne finished fourth in their group, eighth overall, without recording a win and scoring one goal.
