= North West Sydney Spirit FC league record by opponent =

North West Sydney Spirit Football Club is an Australian semi-professional association football club based in Sydney. The club was formed in 1998 and joined the National Soccer League in the 1998–99 season until transforming into the Gladesville Hornsby Football Association in 2004.

North West Sydney Spirit's first team had competed in the National Soccer League and their record against each club faced in the National Soccer League is listed below. North West Sydney Spirit's first National Soccer League match was against Sydney Olympic and they met their 17th and last different NSL opponent, Adelaide United, for the first time in the 2003–04 National Soccer League season. The team that North West Sydney Spirit played the most in league competition was Marconi Fairfield, who they first met in the 1998–99 National Soccer League season. The 11 defeats from 14 meetings against Perth Glory was more than they have lost against any other club. Newcastle United drew 6 league encounters with North West Sydney Spirit, more than any other club. North West Sydney Spirit had recorded more league victories against Football Kingz and Melbourne Knights than against any other club, having beaten them 8 times.

== Key ==
- The table includes results of matches played by North West Sydney Spirit in the National Soccer League.
- The name used for each opponent is the name they had when Newcastle Breakers most recently played a league match against them.
- The columns headed "First" and "Last" contain the first and last seasons in which Newcastle Breakers played league matches against each opponent.
- P = matches played; W = matches won; D = matches drawn; L = matches lost; Win% = percentage of total matches won
- ‡ Clubs with this background and symbol in the "Opponent" column are defunct.

== All-time league record ==
North West Sydney Spirit FC league record by opponent
Club	P	W	D	L	P	W	D	L	P	W	D	L	Win%	First	Last	Notes
Club	Home				Away				Total				Win%	First	Last	Notes
Adelaide Force	6	2	0	4	6	0	2	4	12	2	2	8	16.67	1998–99	2002–03	(Note: Record against Adelaide City included.)
Adelaide Sharks	1	1	0	0	1	1	0	0	2	2	0	0	100.00	1998–99	1998–99	
Adelaide United	1	1	0	0	1	0	0	1	2	1	0	1	50.00	2003–04	2003–04	
Brisbane Strikers	7	2	2	3	7	1	3	3	14	3	5	6	21.43	1998–99	2003–04	
Canberra Cosmos ‡	3	0	0	3	3	2	0	1	6	2	0	4	33.33	1998–99	2000–01	
Carlton ‡	3	3	0	0	3	2	0	1	6	5	0	1	83.33	1998–99	2000–01	
Eastern Pride	3	2	0	1	3	1	1	1	6	3	1	2	50.00	1998–99	2000–01	(Note: Record against Gippsland Falcons included.)
Football Kingz ‡	5	4	0	1	5	4	0	1	10	8	0	2	80.00	1999–2000	2003–04	
Marconi Fairfield	8	5	3	0	8	2	1	5	16	7	4	5	43.75	1998–99	2003–04	
Melbourne Knights	6	4	0	2	6	4	2	0	12	8	2	2	66.67	1998–99	2003–04	
Newcastle United	4	0	4	0	5	1	2	2	9	1	6	2	11.11	2000–01	2003–04	
Parramatta Power ‡	6	3	1	2	6	1	1	4	12	4	2	6	33.33	1999–2000	2003–04	
Perth Glory	7	2	1	4	7	0	0	7	14	2	1	11	14.29	1998–99	2003–04	
South Melbourne	6	4	1	1	6	1	0	5	12	5	1	6	41.67	1998–99	2003–04	
Sydney Olympic	7	1	1	5	7	3	0	4	14	4	1	9	28.57	1998–99	2003–04	(Note: Record against UTS Olympic and Olympic Sharks included.)
Sydney United	6	2	0	4	6	1	3	2	12	3	3	6	25.00	1998–99	2003–04	
Wollongong Wolves	6	4	0	2	6	0	1	5	12	4	1	7	33.33	1998–99	2003–04	
