= Danny Townsend =

Australian sports administrator

- Born: 29 April 1977 (age 49); Sydney, Australia
- Education: University of New South Wales (B.S.S.); Charles Sturt University (MBA, international marketing)
- Occupations: CEO, Australian Professional Leagues (2021–2023)
Association football career
- Positions: Forward; midfielder
Youth career
- Belrose Terrey Hills Raiders
- Manly Warringah Dolphins
Senior career*
Years	Team	Apps	(Gls)
1997–1999	Sydney United 58	26	(2)
1999–2000	Parramatta Power	22	(2)
2001–2002	Manly Warringah Dolphins		
- * Club domestic league appearances and goals

Danny Townsend is an Australian sports administrator, businessman, and previous chief executive of the Australian Professional Leagues. He previously served as the chief executive officer of the A-League Men club Sydney FC between 2017 and 2021. He also had a short professional football career playing in the old National Soccer League.

== Early life and football career ==
Townsend grew up on the Northern Beaches playing youth football in the Manly Warringah Football association. In 1997 having broken through to the Manly Dolphins senior team, then playing in the NSW Second Division, he was signed by Dave Mitchell who was the manager of Sydney United in the National Soccer League. In his second season at Edensor Park, Sydney United would win the league by a single point, however would lose out in the Grand Final against Victorian powerhouse South Melbourne 3–2, ultimately missing out on the 1999 Oceania Club Championship which South Melbourne would go on to win.

Townsend would follow manager Dave Mitchell to new club Parramatta Power where he played for 2 seasons before succumbing to a knee injury. Following his release from the Parramatta club, Townsend would head back to his roots on the Northern Beaches and play out the rest of his career with Manly-Warringah Dolphins in the NSW Second Division under Gary van Egmond. Due to his injuries, Townsend quit playing football at just 23.

== Business career ==
During his playing career, Townsend graduated from the University of New South Wales with a B.S.S in Sports Science. Once retired he gained his MBA in international marketing, gaining the position of commercial director at the Australian Jockey Club. It was in this role that he teamed up with Paul Smith and together they launched their global sports marketing agency Repucom.

In 2016 Rupucom was acquired by Nielsen Sports, with Townsend assuming the role of Global managing director. Through his position and living abroad he worked closely with major global entities including PepsiCo, the airline Emirates, Mastercard, Redbull, the NBA, the NFL, English Premier League and the Asian Football Confederation.

== Return to Australia ==
=== Sydney FC ===
In August 2017, Townsend was named as the new CEO of A-League Men club Sydney FC, replacing Tony Pignata who was moving on to become the CEO of Perth Glory in Western Australia. During his time at Sydney, Townsend oversaw massive growth of the club, with the men's and women's team winning eight trophies and numerous accolades under the guidance of Graham Arnold, Steve Corica and Ante Juric. Townsend also oversaw the planning and development of the clubs Centre of Excellence at Macquarie University, and the transition to the new Sydney Football Stadium from the old Sydney Football Stadium.

=== Australian Professional Leagues ===
In December 2020, Football Australia announced that it would relinquish control of the domestic leagues (A-League Men, A-League Women, and now-defunct A-League Youth) to Australian Professional Leagues (APL), a newly formed entity separating Football Australia as the operating body of the national domestic leagues, in line with best global practice. The APL, in addition to running the national competitions, would take over the operational, commercial, and marketing control of the Professional Leagues and all revenue generation responsibilities. Townsend was announced as CEO of the Australian Professional Leagues.

In December 2022, Townsend and the Australian Professional Leagues announced that the hosting rights to the A-League Grand Final would be in Sydney, having done a deal with New South Wales Government body Events NSW, breaking the tradition that the highest ranked team would earn hosting rights to the grand final. The move was highly criticized by fans, players and pundits alike voicing their disapproval to the move. APL Director and Melbourne Victory chairman Anthony Di Pietro resigned from his position as director following the announcement as it was revealed that the A-League clubs had not been consulted about the deal or involved in the decision making. Townsend however, doubled down on the deal which was reportedly worth $10 million over the three years, stating that it would create a week-long 'festival of football' in the city.

As a result of the decision supporter groups across the A-League staged protests and walk-outs during games leading the APL to concede they did not expect such hostility towards the decision. Tensions between the APL and supporter groups boiled over during the Melbourne City v Melbourne Victory derby where during the midst of both sides active support groups protests, acts of Football hooliganism took place. Multiple flares and projectiles were launched from the active support groups onto the playing surface. Melbourne City goalkeeper Tom Glover picked up flares that had landed within his 18-yard box and in an attempt to dispose of them tossed them back over the advertising hoardings. One of these flares landed in the Melbourne Victory terrace, leading to a violent pitch invasion from hundreds of supporters. In the ensuring chaos, Glover was assaulted by a Melbourne Victory supporter who threw a flare bucket at him, causing a severe laceration to his face and a concussion. Referee Alex King, along with a TV cameraman and several security guards were also assaulted. and the match was ultimately abandoned.

In the aftermath of the match, the APL and Football Australia handed down some of the most severe disciplinary actions seen in Australian Football against Melbourne Victory FC and dozens of supporters, while Victoria Police launched their own criminal investigations against individuals involved in the events. In October 2023, it was announced that Townsend was stepping down from his position as the head the APL, to start a new position in Saudi Arabia as CEO of SURJ Sports Investments.

== Club honours ==
=== Player ===
- Sydney United
  - National Soccer League:
  - Premiers: 1998–99
  - Grand Final Runners-up: 1998–99
