= Brad Swancott =

Australian soccer player

Personal information
- Full name: Bradley Swancott
- Date of birth: 23 July 1979 (age 47)
- Place of birth: Newcastle, Australia
- Height: 1.80 m (5 ft 11 in)
- Position: Goalkeeper

Senior career*
| Years | Team | Apps | (Gls) |
| 1995–2000 | Newcastle Breakers | 21 | (0) |
| 2000–2002 | Newcastle United | 4 | (0) |
| 2002 | Bankstown City | 6 | (0) |
| 2003 | Parramatta Eagles | 11 | (0) |
| 2003–2004 | APIA Leichhardt | 15 | (0) |
| 2004–2010 | Manly United | 114 | (0) |
| 2011 | Lake Macquarie City | 20 | (0) |
| 2011–2014 | Hamilton Olympic | 84 | (0) |
| 2015–2019 | Lambton Jaffas | 103 | (0) |
| Total | | 378 | (0) |

International career
| 1998 | Australia U20 | 12 | (0) |
Medal record
Representing Australia
Men's Association football
OFC U-20 Championship
| Winner | 1998 Samoa |
- * Club domestic league appearances and goals

Bradley Swancott (born 23 July 1979), is an Australian former soccer player.

== Club career ==
Born in Newcastle, New South Wales, Swancott represented local side Newcastle Breakers in the National Soccer League, making his debut aged just 16. However, he spent most of his time there as understudy to Bob Catlin, and totaled only 21 matches in 5 years. When the Breakers dissolved in 2000, Swancott joined the newly formed Newcastle United, where he made 4 appearances.

After his release by Newcastle United, Swancott spent time with NSW Premier League teams, including Bankstown City, Parramatta Eagles and APIA Leichhardt. He then returned to Newcastle to play for local sides Lake Macquarie City, Hamilton Olympic and Lambton Jaffas.

== Personal life ==
Swancott still lives and works in Newcastle. Currently working in his own business that supplies Workwear & Safety equipment to Newcastle and the Hunter Region. He also has business interests in mining and strategic procurement projects.

== Career statistics ==
=== Club ===
As of 31 May 2020.

| Club | Season | League | | | Cup | | Other | | Total | |
| Club | Season | Division | Apps | Goals | Apps | Goals | Apps | Goals | Apps | Goals |
|---|---|---|---|---|---|---|---|---|---|---|
| Newcastle Breakers | 1996–97 | National Soccer League | 3 | 0 | 0 | 0 | 0 | 0 | 3 | 0 |
| Newcastle Breakers | 1997–98 | National Soccer League | 17 | 0 | 0 | 0 | 0 | 0 | 17 | 0 |
| Newcastle Breakers | 1998–99 | National Soccer League | 1 | 0 | 0 | 0 | 0 | 0 | 1 | 0 |
| Newcastle Breakers | Total | | 21 | 0 | 0 | 0 | 0 | 0 | 21 | 0 |
| Newcastle Jets | 2000–01 | National Soccer League | 4 | 0 | 0 | 0 | 0 | 0 | 4 | 0 |
| Bankstown City | 2002–03 | NSW Premier League | 6 | 0 | 0 | 0 | 0 | 0 | 6 | 0 |
| Parramatta Eagles | 2002–03 | NSW Premier League | 11 | 0 | 0 | 0 | 0 | 0 | 11 | 0 |
| APIA Leichhardt | 2003–04 | NSW Premier League | 15 | 0 | 0 | 0 | 0 | 0 | 15 | 0 |
| Lambton Jaffas | 2015 | NPL Northern NSW | 20 | 0 | 0 | 0 | 0 | 0 | 20 | 0 |
| Lambton Jaffas | 2016 | NPL Northern NSW | 18 | 0 | 0 | 0 | 0 | 0 | 18 | 0 |
| Lambton Jaffas | 2017 | NPL Northern NSW | 21 | 0 | 2 (Note: Appearances in the FFA Cup) | 0 | 0 | 0 | 23 | 0 |
| Lambton Jaffas | 2018 | NPL Northern NSW | 22 | 0 | 2 | 0 | 0 | 0 | 24 | 0 |
| Lambton Jaffas | 2019 | NPL Northern NSW | 21 | 0 | 0 | 0 | 0 | 0 | 21 | 0 |
| Lambton Jaffas | Total | | 103 | 0 | 4 | 0 | 0 | 0 | 107 | 0 |
| Career total | | | 159 | 0 | 4 | 0 | 0 | 0 | 163 | 0 |

== Honours ==
Australia U-20

- OFC U-19 Men's Championship: 1998
