= Steve Eagleton (disambiguation) =

Steve Eagleton may refer to:

- Stephen Eagleton (born 1976), Australian footballer
- Steve Eagleton (Bury footballer) (fl. 1985), see List of Bury F.C. players (1–24 appearances)
