= Lee Sterrey =

Australian soccer player and coach

Personal information
- Date of birth: 1 May 1961 (age 65)
- Place of birth: Australia
- Position: Defender

Senior career*
Years	Team	Apps	(Gls)
1981–1982	Sydney Croatia		
1984	Sydney Croatia	26	(0)
1985–1986	Marconi Fairfield	44	(0)
1989	Blacktown City	17	(0)
Total		87+	(0+)

Managerial career
- 1996–1997: Marconi Stallions (youth)
- 1997–1998: Marconi Stallions (assistant)
- 1998–2000: Newcastle Breakers
- 2000–2001: Newcastle United
- 2001–2002: Marconi Stallions
- 2002: MSC Liverpool
- Bankstown City
- 2003–20??: Olympic Sharks
- 2004–2006: Fiji
- 2008: Granville Rage
- 2008-20??: Marconi Stallions
- 2011: Rockdale City Suns
- 2011–2012: Parramatta
- 2016: Macarthur Rams
- 2026–: Valentine
- * Club domestic league appearances and goals

Lee Sterrey (born 1 May 1961) is an Australian soccer coach and former player who currently as head coach of Valentine FC in National Premier Leagues Northern NSW. He has managed in the Australian National Soccer League (NSL) and Fiji clubs.

== Playing career ==
Sterrey played 87 times in the National Soccer League (NSL), turning out for Sydney Croatia in their first NSL season in 1984. In 1985, Sterrey moved to Marconi on a A$4,000 transfer. He played two seasons for the Stallions, making 44 appearances. Sterrey returned to the NSL in 1989 playing for Blacktown City.

== Coaching career ==
Taking charge of the Fiji national selection in 2004 on a two-year contract with the aim of improving the team and securing an A-League job, Sterrey has stated that Fijian football has gone in a downwards trajectory, disliking the use of foreign players and advising the use of young, homegrown talents instead. His first win as coach would be a 1–0 victory over India on 17 August 2005. By 2006, the Australian was replaced by Uruguayan Juan Carlos Buzzetti which would be his only coaching appointment abroad. He joins Macarthur Rams in his home country in 2016 NPL NSW 2 as head coach.

== Achievements ==
- National Soccer League Championship Grand Final: 2002–03
