= Steven Bozinovski =

Australian soccer player

Steven Božinovski
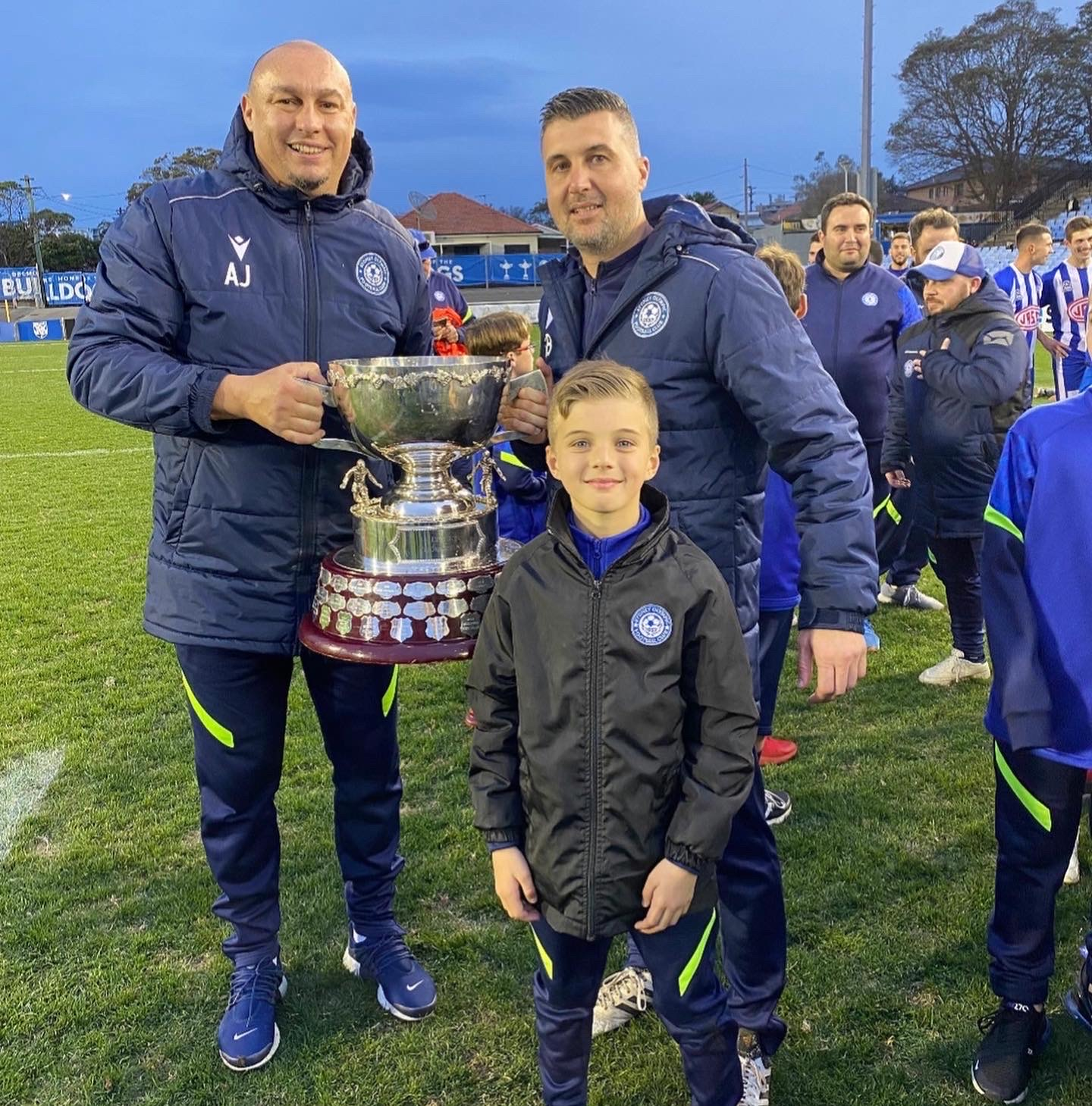
- Steven Bozinovski winning the NPL championship

Personal information
- Full name: Steven Božinovski
- Date of birth: 16 June 1981 (age 45)
- Place of birth: Sydney, Australia
- Height: 1.82 m (5 ft 11 1/2 in)
- Position: Right back

Senior career*
Years	Team	Apps	(Gls)
1998	Bankstown City Lions	2	(0)
1999	Rockdale City Suns		
1999–2000	Sydney United	18	(0)
2000–2001	Rockdale City Suns	11	(1)
2001–2003	Marconi Stallions	43	(0)
2002–2004	Rockdale City Suns	17	(0)
2004	Radnički Niš	14	(0)
2005	K.V. Oostende	16	(0)
2005–2006	A.P.I.A. Leichhardt Tigers		
2006–2007	Sydney FC	1	(0)
2007–2009	Bonnyrigg White Eagles	45	(6)
2010	Rockdale City Suns	19	(0)
2011	Bankstown City Lions		

Managerial career
- Sydney Olympic (Assistant)
- * Club domestic league appearances and goals as of 31 October 2019

Steven Božinovski (born 16 June 1981) is a former professional Australian soccer player.

== Early life ==
Božinovski was born in Sydney, Australia, to parents of Macedonian descent. He developed his football foundations within Sydney’s strong ethnic-club football system, progressing through local youth competitions before entering senior football in his teenage years.

== Club career ==
=== Early career in Australia ===
Božinovski began his senior career with Bankstown City Lions in 1998. He later represented Rockdale City Suns and Sydney United, establishing himself as a reliable right back known for his defensive discipline and work rate.

In 2002, he played a key role in Rockdale City Suns’ successful campaign that culminated in winning the NSW Second Division championship.

=== European career ===
In 2004, Božinovski moved to Europe, signing with FK Radnički Niš in the First League of Serbia and Montenegro. Later that year, he joined Belgian club K.V. Oostende in the Jupiler League, gaining experience in a fully professional European environment.

=== Return to Australia ===
After returning to Australia, Božinovski played for several prominent clubs in New South Wales, including Marconi Stallions, A.P.I.A. Leichhardt Tigers, Bonnyrigg White Eagles, and multiple spells with Rockdale City Suns and Bankstown City Lions.

In 2006, he joined Sydney FC in the A-League, making appearances during the early years of the competition. He later enjoyed an extended period with Bonnyrigg White Eagles in the NSW Premier League, where he was valued for his leadership and consistency.

Božinovski concluded his playing career in the National Premier Leagues NSW before retiring from competitive football.

== Playing style ==
Primarily deployed as a right back, Božinovski was known for his tactical awareness, positional discipline, and ability to contribute in both defensive and attacking phases. His longevity and adaptability across different leagues earned him respect within Australian football circles.

== Coaching career ==
Following his retirement, Božinovski transitioned into coaching and football development. He has served as an assistant coach with clubs including Sydney Olympic and Sydney United in the National Premier Leagues NSW, specialising in defensive organisation and player development.

In October 2024, he was appointed Assistant Manager at Sydney United, continuing his involvement at senior semi-professional level.

== Honours ==
=== Club ===
- NSW Second Division
  - Champions: 2002 (Rockdale City Suns)

== Career ==
Born in Sydney, Australia, a son of Macedonian emigrants, he started his career in 1998 with the Bankstown City Lions, a club strongly supported by his fatherland community. The next year, he moved to another Macedonian community backed club, the rival Rockdale City Suns. After one year there, he moved to Sydney United. After a poor 1999–2000 season, he returned to Rockdale where, excepting a short stint in the Marconi Stallions in the 2001–02 season, he stayed until 2004. With the Rockdale Suns he won the 2002 NSW Second Division. In summer of 2004, he moved to Europe where he played the first part of the 2004–2005 season in the First League of Serbia and Montenegro club Radnički Niš, and then, in winter, moved to Jupiler League club K.V. Oostende. He returned to Sydney the next year to play in A.P.I.A. Leichhardt. In 2006, he had a short stint in an A-League club Sydney FC, before signing in 2007 for the Bonnyrigg White Eagles.
