= Chad Mansley =

Australian soccer player

Personal information
- Date of birth: November 13, 1980 (age 44)
- Place of birth: Australia
- Position(s): Forward

Senior career*
Years	Team	Apps	(Gls)
2000	Newcastle Breakers	1	(0)
2000–2001	Leyton Orient	1	(0)
2001	Newcastle United	3	(1)
- *Club domestic league appearances and goals

Chad Mansley (born 13 November 1980) is an Australian retired soccer player who played as a forward.

== Club career ==
Mansley played junior soccer for Newcastle teams Cardiiff, Dudleigh and Adamstown.

Mansley made his debut for the Newcastle Breakers in November 1999 as a late substitute against Adelaide Force.

In mid-2000, Mansley trialled with Watford, playing five matches during the club's preseason. In September 2000, Mansley joined Watford on a three-month contract after protracted negotiations between Newcastle Breakers and Watford. The Breakers had initially requested a A$300,000 transfer fee. He played six times for the reserve team before being told by the manager Graham Taylor that he was not required, leaving in November 2000.

He joined Leyton Orient on a free transfer in December 2000, making one league appearance as a substitute. Mansley chose to return despite reportedly being offered a contract by Leyton Orient.

On his return from England in early 2001, Mansley signed with Newcastle United. Ahead of the 2001–02 National Soccer League season, Mansley was sent out on loan to Central Coast Coasties.

Playing for Highfields Azzurri, Mansley scored the winning golden goal in the 2002 Northern New South Wales State League grand final.

In early 2004, Mansley transferred to Weston Bears. The Bears won the 2004 Northern New South Wales State League premiership but were beaten grand finalists.

== International career ==
Mansley toured three times with the Australian Schoolboys team between 1997 and 1999.

== Honours ==
Highfields Azzurri

- Northern New South Wales State League Championship: 2002

Weston Bears

- Northern New South Wales State League Premiership: 2004

Individual

- Australian Sports Medal: 2000
