= Shanghai International Football Tournament =

Annual football event in China

The Shanghai International Football Tournament (SIFT) is an annual football event in China that has been hosted and organized by the municipal government of Shanghai since 1991. The tournament usually consists of two double-header evenings featuring all four clubs.

== History ==
After the first event in 1991, SIFT was held every year until 2001, when it took a four-year break. Its sponsors before this time included Marlboro, Guanshenyuan, Fushoutong, Huili and Budweiser.

In 2005, the tournament was revived by USSM, a sports marketing company, featuring three Spanish La Liga teams (Villarreal, Sevilla, and Real Zaragoza) as well as Shanghai United, a dream team chosen by a public vote.

SIFT 2006 featured three international clubs - Manchester City, Atlético Madrid and Kashima Antlers - competing against a China Super League club, Shanghai Shenhua FC, in the Shanghai Hong Kou Stadium. The TV broadcast of the 2006 event was shown in 115 countries around the world.

== Champions ==
Edition	Year	Winner	Runner-up	Third	Fourth
1	1991	Romania	China	Poland	(Netherlands) ADO Den Haag
2	1992	Romania	(Denmark) Lyngby Boldklub	Slovakia	(Israel) Hapoel Petah Tikva
3	1993	(China) Liaoning	(China) Shanghai Shenhua	(Mexico) Necaxa	South Korea
4	1994	(Switzerland) Servette	(Germany) Dynamo Dresden	(China) Shanghai Shenhua	(Brazil) Corinthians
5	1996	(Uruguay) Nacional	(Bulgaria) Lokomotiv Sofia	(Belgium) KV Mechelen	(China) Shanghai Shenhua
6	1998	Czech Republic	(Uruguay) Rampla Juniors	(Germany) TSV 1860 Munich	(China) Shanghai Shenhua
7	1999	Uruguay	(China) Shanghai Shenhua	(Japan) Yokohama FC	(Australia) Sydney United
8	2001	(South Korea) Gimcheon Sangmu	(China) Shanghai Huili	(Cameroon) Tonnerre Yaoundé	(China) Shanghai Shenhua
9	2005	(Spain) Sevilla	(Spain) Villarreal	(Spain) Real Zaragoza	(China) Shanghai United
10	2006	(Spain) Atlético Madrid	(England) Manchester City	(Japan) Kashima Antlers	(China) Shanghai Shenhua

== See also ==
- Football in China
