= Andy Rakic =

Australian soccer player (born 1980)

Personal information
- Date of birth: 1 December 1980 (age 45)
- Place of birth: Canberra, Australia
- Height: 1.78 m (5 ft 10 in)
- Positions: Defender; midfielder

Senior career*
Years	Team	Apps	(Gls)
1999–2000	Sydney United	10	(0)
2000	Canberra Cosmos	9	(0)
2000–2003	Canberra Deakin	9	(1)
2002–2003	→ Belconnen Blue Devils (loan)	17	(1)
2003–2004	NK Zagreb	6	(1)
2004–2005	Kickers Offenbach	1	(0)
2005–2007	TGM SV Jügesheim	69	(4)
2007–2010	Eintracht Trier	68	(2)
2010–2012	Victoria Rosport		
- * Club domestic league appearances and goals

Andy Rakic (born 1 December 1980) is an Australian former professional soccer player who played as a defender or midfielder
