= Events New South Wales =

Events New South Wales was established in 2007 by the (then) Premier of New South Wales, Morris Iemma to "market Sydney and NSW as a leading global events destination". It was tasked with attracting and supporting the types of events that could bring significant economic and community benefits to both Sydney and Regional NSW. Events New South Wales is owned and funded by the New South Wales Government, setting itself a budget of $85 million over three years to attract events to the state.

The Board of Events New South Wales includes John O’Neill (Managing Director and CEO, Australian Rugby Union), Professor Gavin Brown (Inaugural Director, Royal Institute of Australia), John Coates (President, Australian Olympic Committee), Richard Colless (Chairman, Sydney Swans), Johanna Griggs (Television and Sports Host), Peter Ivany (Ivany Investment Group), Geoff Parmenter (Chief Executive Officer, Events New South Wales), David Richmond (Coordinator General, NSW Department of Premier and Cabinet), Belinda Seper (Chief Executive Officer, Belinda International), Charlotte Vidor (Director, Toga Hospitality), and Kim Williams (Chief Executive Officer, Foxtel).

In October 2008, Events New South Wales announced the first recurring Master Events Calendar for Sydney and NSW, and the formation of three new festivals for Sydney: Vivacity (New Year celebrations, January), Vivid Sydney (Music, Lighting & Creative Industries Festival, May–June) and Crave (Lifestyle, Food & Culture, October).

In July 2011 Events NSW, along with other government organisations, formed Destination NSW.
