= Andrew Crews =

Australian retired footballer

Personal information
- Date of birth: 18 August 1973 (age 53)
- Position: Goalkeeper

Senior career*
Years	Team	Apps	(Gls)
1992–1995	Blacktown City		
1995–1999	Sydney United	34	(0)
1999–2001	Parramatta Power	35	(0)
2001–2002	Leichhardt Tigers	23	(0)
2002–2004	Wollongong Wolves	46	(0)
2004	Northern Tigers	13	(0)
2004–2005	St George		
2006	Marconi Stallions		
2006	Perth Glory	0	(0)

International career
2005	Australia (beach soccer)	2	(0)
- * Club domestic league appearances and goals

Andrew Crews (born 18 August 1973) is an Australian retired soccer player who played as a goalkeeper. He is currently the goalkeeping coach for Hills United in the NPL NSW League One. Andrew played for a number of clubs in the National Soccer League. He represented Australia in beach soccer.

== Playing career ==
=== Club ===
In September 1999, Crews moved from Sydney United to fellow National Soccer League club Parramatta Power.

In 2002, after a year spent playing in the NSW State League for Leichhardt Tigers, Crews returned to the National Soccer League to play for Wollongong Wolves.

Crews signed with A-League side Perth Glory in July 2006 after an injury to Jason Petkovic. He made his debut for the side in a 2006 A-League Pre-Season Challenge Cup loss to Sydney FC.

=== International ===
Crews was selected for Australia in beach soccer for the 2005 FIFA Beach Soccer World Cup, the inaugural edition of the tournament.
