= Steve Refenes =

Australian soccer player

Personal information
- Date of birth: 19 February 1970 (age 56)
- Position: Midfielder

Senior career*
Years	Team	Apps	(Gls)
1989–1992	Sydney Olympic	54	(2)
1992–1996	Olympiacos	9	(0)
1993–1994	→ Panionios (loan)	24	(0)
1995–1996	→ Panelefsiniakos (loan)		
1996–1997	Sydney Olympic		
1997–1998	Sydney United		
Total		85+	(2+)

International career
1992	Australia U23	4	(0)
- * Club domestic league appearances and goals

Steve Refenes, also known as Stavros Refenes (born 19 February 1970) is an Australian former professional soccer player who played as a midfielder.

== Career ==
Refenes played club football in Australia for Sydney Olympic and Sydney United, and in Greece for Olympiacos, Panionios and Panelefsiniakos.

Refenes also competed at the 1992 Summer Olympics, making four appearances in the tournament.

== Personal life ==
Refenes is an Australian of Greek descent.
