= Bob Catlin =

English-born Australian soccer player

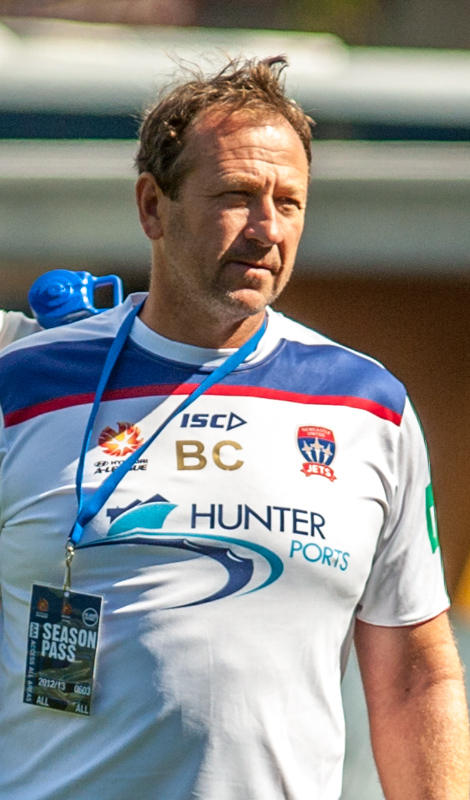

Personal information
- Full name: Robert Catlin
- Date of birth: 22 June 1965 (age 61)
- Place of birth: Wembley, England
- Position: Goalkeeper

Senior career*
Years	Team	Apps	(Gls)
1984–1985	APIA-Leichhardt	22	(1)
1987–1992	Marconi Fairfield	140	(0)
1992	Warringah Dolphins	1	(0)
1992–1994	Notts County	3	(0)
1993	→ Birmingham City (loan)	8	(0)
1994–1997	Marconi Fairfield	69	(0)
1997–1998	Sydney Olympic	26	(0)
1998	Leichhardt Tigers	10	(0)
1998–2000	Newcastle Breakers	61	(0)
2000–2001	Newcastle United	25	(0)
2001–2002	Marconi Stallions	2	(0)
2002–2003	APIA-Leichhardt	25	(0)
2003–2004	Canterbury-Marrickville	22	(0)
2004	Manly-Warringah Dolphins	11	(0)
Total		425	(1)
- * Club domestic league appearances and goals

Robert Catlin (born 22 June 1965) is an English-born Australian former professional football (soccer) player who played in the Football League for Notts County and Birmingham City and played more than 300 games in the Australian National Soccer League. He played as a goalkeeper.

== Career ==
Catlin was born in Wembley, London and raised in Australia. He began his football career in Australian domestic football, playing for APIA-Leichhardt and 140 games and scoring one goal in the National Soccer League (NSL) for Marconi Fairfield before trying his luck in England. Catlin and compatriot Shaun Murphy joined Notts County in August 1992 for a total fee of £137,000. Catlin conceded eight goals in his first three appearances for the club. In March 1993 he joined Birmingham City on loan, but after his first game it transpired that the club had mistakenly signed him instead of the Notts County youth goalkeeper they had watched. In November 1993, Notts County was fined £20,000 for irregularities in the transfer of Catlin and Murphy, relating to payments made to a third party other than the players' clubs.

In 1994 Catlin returned to Australia where he played out a long career with numerous clubs. He holds the record for appearances by a goalkeeper in Australia's national competitions. In December 2000, he became the first NSL keeper to record 100 clean sheets when Newcastle United held league leader South Melbourne to a 0–0 draw in his 325th national league match, going on to set a record of 105 clean sheets which in 2003 was beaten by Jason Petkovic.

He represented Australia at schoolboy international level in 1981, but never played a full international for his adopted country, though he was chosen for two representative matches against visiting European club sides, Torpedo Moscow in 1990 and Vitesse Arnhem in 1993.
