= Nick Bosevski =

Australian footballer

Personal information
- Full name: Nick Bosevski
- Date of birth: 2 December 1976 (age 49)
- Place of birth: Australia
- Position: Forward

Youth career
- Marconi

Senior career*
Years	Team	Apps	(Gls)
1994–1997	Marconi	6	(0)
1997	Bankstown City		
1997–1998	Sydney United	18	(2)
1999	Canterbury-Marrickville		
1999–2000	Sydney United	26	(3)
2000–2001	RFC Liège	7	(3)
2001–2002	Olympic Sharks	1	(0)
2002	Rockdale City		
2002–2003	IFK Norrköping	24	(8)
2004	Johor FC		
2004–2010	Rockdale City		
- * Club domestic league appearances and goals as of 6 April 2018 ‡ National team caps and goals as of 6 April 2018

Nick Bosevski (born 2 December 1976) is an Australian footballer. He played two seasons for IFK Norrköping.

== Early life ==
Bosevski was born on 2 December 1976. Born in Australia, he is a native of Sydney, Australia.

== Career ==
Bosevski spent most of his playing career in Australia with a spell at Liège, Belgium (then in Division 2) in 2000/2001 and at Norrköping, Sweden (2002 and 2003). He was a late-season addition to Norrköping in the 2002 Allsvenskan, making his debut at Landskrona on 12 September 2002.

Four days later, for his first match at Norrköping, he scored a hat-trick against Elfsborg. This was not enough to prevent the club from going down and Bosevski and Norrköping spent the next season in Superettan.

In 2026, Bosevski signed with the Sussex inlet Seahawks, scoring a hatrick on debut in over 35s.

== Style of play ==
Bosevski played as a forward. He was known for his agility.

== Personal life ==
Bosevski is a Sagittarius. He has enjoyed playing chess as a hobby.
