= John Buonavoglia =

Australian footballer

Personal information
- Full name: John Buonavoglia
- Date of birth: 19 October 1975 (age 51)
- Place of birth: Naples, Italy
- Height: 1.65 m (5 ft 5 in)
- Position: Striker

Senior career*
Years	Team	Apps	(Gls)
1998–2000	Newcastle Breakers	62	(22)
2000–2001	Newcastle United	28	(7)
2001–2004	Parramatta Power	48	(20)
2005–2006	Sydney FC	3	(0)
- * Club domestic league appearances and goals

John Buonavoglia is an Australian soccer player who played in the National Soccer League (NSL) and the A-League.
