= Peter Bennett (soccer, born 1969) =

Australian soccer player

Personal information
- Date of birth: 29 October 1969 (age 57)
- Position: Defender

Youth career
- Blacktown City FC

Senior career*
| Years | Team | Apps | (Gls) |
| –1989/90 | Blacktown City FC | | |
| 1991–1993 | APIA Leichhardt Tigers FC | 20 | (1) |
| 1997 | Penrith City SC | | |
| 1997–1999 | Sydney United 58 FC | 55 | (2) |
| 1999–2002 | Parramatta Power SC | 63 | (4) |
| 2002–2003 | Penrith City SC | 3 | (0) |
| 2003 | Geylang United | | |
| | Penrith City SC | 16 | (2) |
- * Club domestic league appearances and goals

Peter Bennett (born 29 October 1969) is an Australian retired soccer player who is last known to have played for Penrith City SC in his home country.

== Singapore ==
While featuring for Geylang United of the Singaporean S.League in 2003, Bennett was the victim of an attack by Singaporean footballer Shariff Abdul Samat in a league match, leaving him with a broken nose and getting Shariff banned for nine months. The Australian defender then made a complaint to the local authorities, resulting in the S.League's Disciplinary Committee convoking to formally decide the case.
