= Stephen Eagleton =

Australian soccer player

Steve Eagleton
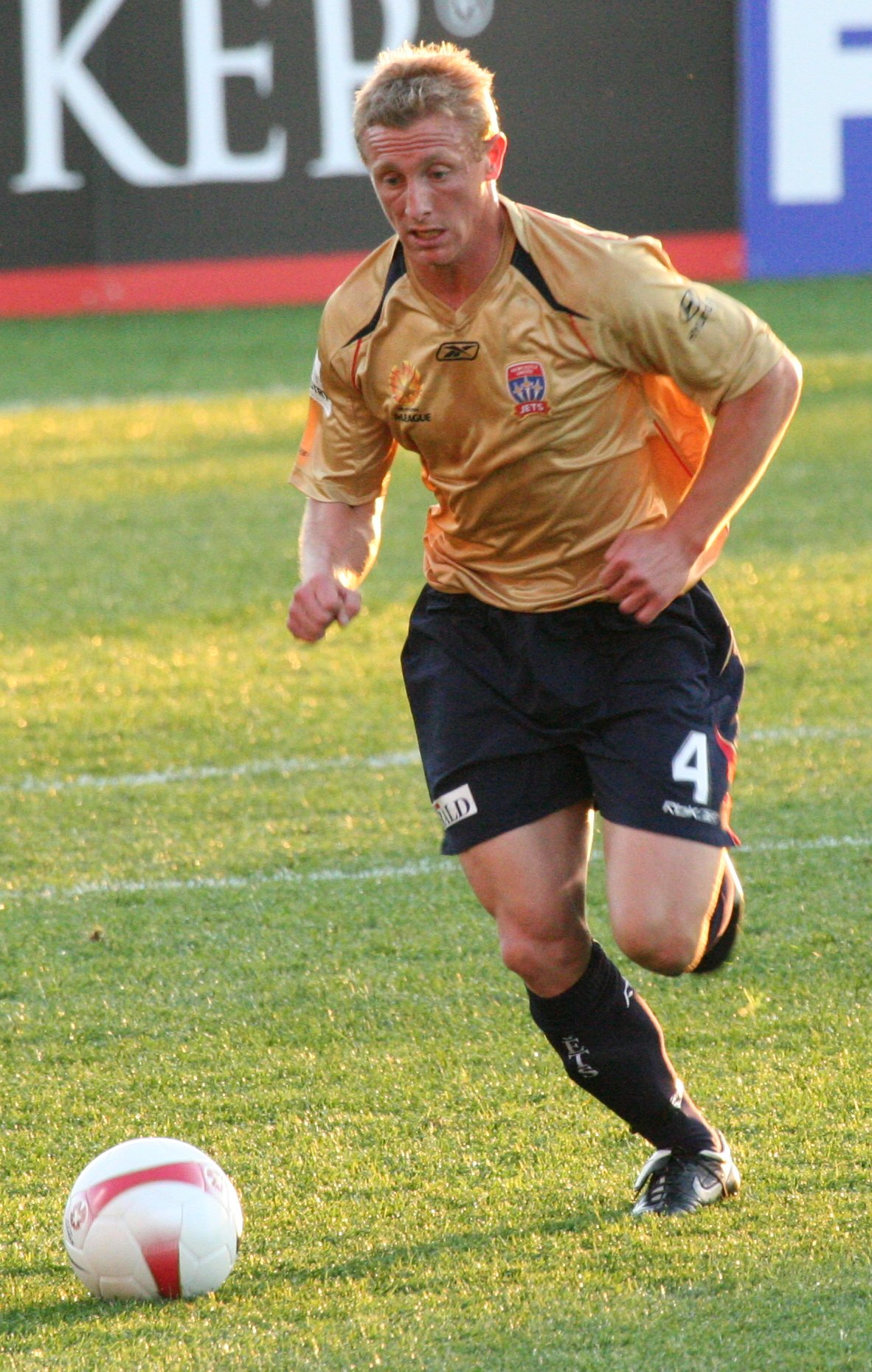

Personal information
- Full name: Stephen Eagleton
- Date of birth: 26 October 1976 (age 50)
- Place of birth: Sydney, Australia
- Height: 1.68 m (5 ft 6 in)
- Position: Right back

Senior career*
Years	Team	Apps	(Gls)
1993–1998	Bankstown City	37	(6)
1997–1998	→ Sydney Olympic (loan)	12	(0)
1998–1999	Sydney United	3	(1)
1999–2002	Parramatta Power	60	(2)
2002–2004	Newcastle United	30	(0)
2005–2008	Newcastle Jets	30	(0)
2008	Wollongong FC	1	(0)
- * Club domestic league appearances and goals

Stephen Eagleton (born 26 October 1976) is a retired Australian footballer.

== Biography ==
He had previous NSL experience with Sydney United, Parramatta Power and Newcastle United. He was released by the Newcastle Jets after the 2006–07 season, but was resigned before the start of the 2007–08 season. His season was cut short by injury, though he joined his teammates on the victory dias when the Jets won the 2007–08 A-League Championship. He subsequently retired from professional football. Currently coaches the Central Coast Mariners Academy under 11 team.

== Honours ==
Newcastle Jets

- A-League Championship: 2007–08
