= Walter Ardone =

Australian soccer player

Personal information
- Date of birth: 30 January 1972 (age 54)
- Place of birth: Buenos Aires, Argentina
- Position: Midfielder

Senior career*
Years	Team	Apps	(Gls)
1992–1993	Sydney Olympic	11	(1)
1993–1994	Parramatta Eagles	4	(0)
1994–1995	Heidelberg United	22	(2)
1995–1998	Sydney Olympic	63	(6)
1998–1999	Sydney United	27	(4)
1999–2001	Parramatta Power	37	(4)
2002	Geylang United	13	(0)
Total		177	(17)

International career
1996	Australia	1	(0)
- * Club domestic league appearances and goals

Walter Ardone (born 30 January 1972) is a former Australian professional soccer player who was a midfielder.

== Club career ==
Ardone played early football for Sydney Olympic, making his National Soccer League debut in 1992. He moved in 1993 to Parramatta Eagles where he spent a season before moving again to Heidelberg United. After a year at Heidelberg he returned to Olympic. In 1998, he moved to Sydney United for a season before a move to Parramatta Power. In two season with the Power he played 37 NSL matches. In 2002, he played thirteen times for Singapore team Geylang United.

== International career ==
Ardone played one match for the Australia national football team in 1996 in a match against Chile in Antofagasta.
