= Michael Gibson (soccer) =

Australian soccer player (born 1963)

Personal information
- Full name: Michael Gibson
- Date of birth: 1 March 1963 (age 63)
- Place of birth: Australia
- Position: Goalkeeper

Senior career*
| Years | Team | Apps | (Gls) |
| 1984–1985 | Penrith City | 46 | (0) |
| 1986–1991 | St George Saints | 90 | (1) |
| 1991 | Blacktown City Demons | | |
| 1991–1993 | Newcastle Breakers | 42 | (0) |
| 1994–1996 | Sydney Olympic | 77 | (0) |
| 1997 | Bonnyrigg White Eagles | 24 | (0) |
| 1997–1998 | Marconi Stallions | 5 | (0) |
| 1998 | Penrith City SC | | |
| 1998–1999 | Sydney United | 15 | (0) |
| 1999 | Penrith City SC | | |
| 1999–2001 | Parramatta Power | 13 | (0) |
| 2002 | Schofields Scorpions | | |
| 2002–2003 | Canterbury-Marrickville | 0 | (0) |
| 2004 | Schofields Scorpions | 13 | (0) |

International career^{‡}
| 1985 | Australia B | 1 | (0) |
| 1988 | Australia | 1 | (0) |
- * Club domestic league appearances and goals as of 06:03, 21 April 2020 (UTC) ‡ National team caps and goals as of 27 June 2011

Michael Gibson (born 1 March 1963) is an Australian soccer player who represented the Australia national soccer team on 7 (1 A-International and 6 B-Internationals) occasions.

== Club career ==
Over the course of his career Gibson turned out for St George Saints, Blacktown City Demons, Newcastle Breakers, Sydney Olympic, Bonnyrigg White Eagles, Marconi Stallions, Sydney United, Penrith City SC, Parramatta Power, Schofields Scorpions and Canterbury-Marrickville. Overall, he played 288 times in the Australian National Soccer League (NSL).

== International career ==
Gibson represented his nation on 7 occasions between 1985 and 1989 (1 A-International and 6 B-Internationals). His sole A International appearance for Australia was on 9 March 1988 in an Olympic Games qualification match against Taiwan at Hindmarsh Stadium in Adela* National Soccer League Premiership: 1996-97ide. Australia won the match 3–2.

== Honours ==
Blacktown City Demons

- NSW Division One Championship: 1991

Sydney United

- National Soccer League Premiership: 1998-99
