= 1998–99 National Soccer League =

Australian soccer season

NSL 1998-99
- League: National Soccer League
- Sport: Association football
- Duration: 1998-99
- Number of teams: 15

NSL season
- Champions: South Melbourne
- Top scorer: Mile Sterjovski; Pablo Cardozo (18 each)

National Soccer League seasons
- ← 1997–98 1999–2000 →

The 1998–99 National Soccer League season, known under a sponsorship arrangement as the 1998–99 Ericsson Cup, was the 23rd season of the National Soccer League in Australia.

== Overview ==
It was contested by 15 teams, and South Melbourne won the championship. Northern Spirit FC entered the competition.

== Regular season ==
=== League table ===
Pos	Team	Pld	W	D	L	GF	GA	GD	Pts	Qualification
1	Sydney United	28	18	4	6	53	33	+20	58	Qualification for the Finals series
2	South Melbourne (C)	28	17	6	5	50	26	+24	57	Qualification for the Finals series and the Oceania Club Championship
3	Perth Glory	28	16	5	7	62	37	+25	53	Qualification for the Finals series
4	Marconi Fairfield	28	15	3	10	53	47	+6	48	Qualification for the Finals series
5	Northern Spirit	28	14	4	10	36	35	+1	46	Qualification for the Finals series
6	Adelaide City	28	13	6	9	39	26	+13	45	Qualification for the Finals series
7	Sydney Olympic	28	12	7	9	46	36	+10	43	
8	Newcastle Breakers	28	11	7	10	29	33	−4	40	
9	Brisbane Strikers	28	11	6	11	41	47	−6	39	
10	Wollongong Wolves	28	8	8	12	45	52	−7	32	
11	Carlton	28	9	4	15	47	47	0	31	
12	Melbourne Knights	28	8	5	15	32	43	−11	29	
13	West Adelaide	28	7	6	15	36	46	−10	27	
14	Gippsland Falcons	28	5	10	13	17	44	−27	25	
15	Canberra Cosmos	28	4	3	21	21	55	−34	15	

Source: rsssf.com
Rules for classification: 1) points; 2) goal difference; 3) number of goals scored.
(C) Champions

== Finals series ==
=== Bracket ===
Elimination Finals
6	Adelaide City	0	1	1
3	Perth Glory	0	2	2
5	Northern Spirit	0	1	1
4	Marconi Stallions	0	2	2

Major/Minor semi-finals
9 & 16 May 1999
2	South Melbourne	2	0	2
1	Sydney United	1	0	1
15 May 1999
3	Perth Glory	1
4	Marconi Stallions	0

Preliminary Final
23 May 1999
1	Sydney United	2
3	Perth Glory	1

Grand Final
30 May 1999
South Melbourne	3
Sydney United	2

=== Elimination finals ===
- Northern Spirit 0-0 : 1-2 Marconi Stallions
- Adelaide City 0-0 : 1-2 Perth Glory

=== Major semi-final ===
- South Melbourne 2-1 : 0-0 Sydney United

=== Minor semi-final ===
- Perth Glory 1-0 Marconi Stallions

=== Preliminary final ===
- Sydney United 2-1 Perth Glory

=== Grand Final ===
30 May 1999
15:15 AEST

South Melbourne	3 – 2	Sydney United
Trimboli 53'; Anastasiadis 63,87'	(report)	Sterjovski 8'; Townsend 90+'

Olympic Park Stadium, Melbourne
Attendance: 15,194
Referee: Simon Michallef

SOUTH MELBOURNE:
GK	1	(Australia) Michael Petkovic
MF	2	(Australia) Steve Iosifidis
DF	3	(Australia) Fausto De Amicis
DF	4	(Australia) Nick Orlic
DF	5	(Australia) Con Blatsis
MF	6	(Australia) David Clarkson
MF	7	(Australia) Steve Panopoulos
FW	8	(New Zealand) Vaughan Coveny
FW	9	(Australia) Paul Trimboli (c)	(substituted off) 68'
FW	10	(Australia) Michael Curcija	(substituted off) 63'
MF	15	(Australia) Goran Lozanovski	(substituted off) 81'
Substitutes:
GK	20	(Australia) Chris Jones
FW	11	(Australia) John Anastasiadis	(substituted in) 63'
MF	16	(Australia) George Goutzioulis	(substituted in) 68'
FW	17	(Australia) Jim Tsekinis	(substituted in) 81'
DF	18	(Australia) Robert Liparoti
Manager:
(Australia) Ange Postecoglou
Joe Marston Medal:
(Australia) Goran Lozanovski

SYDNEY UNITED:
GK	30	(Australia) Mike Gibson
DF	2	(Australia) David Barrett
DF	4	(Australia) Velimir Kupresak (c)
DF	5	(Australia) Richard Plesa
DF	6	(Australia) Joe Vrkic
MF	7	(Australia) Jacob Burns	(substituted off) 88'
FW	9	(Australia) Mile Sterjovski
FW	10	(Australia) Nathan Day	(substituted off) 64'
MF	11	(Australia) Steve Berry
DF	17	(Australia) Michael Santalab	(substituted off) 68'
MF	28	(Australia) Peter Bennett
Substitutes:
GK	20	(Australia) Barney Smith
DF	8	(Australia) Walter Ardone	(substituted in) 88'
MF	15	(Australia) Danny Townsend	(substituted in) 68'
FW	19	(Australia) Joel Griffiths	(substituted in) 64'
MF	25	(Australia) Ante Moric
Manager:
(Australia) David Mitchell
