= History of Melbourne Knights FC =

Melbourne Knights FC is an Australian semi-professional soccer club based in the Melbourne suburb of Sunshine North. It was founded in 1953, and has had extensive success in its history, with the club's peak coming in the mid-1990s when it was crowned Australian champions, winning back-to-back National Soccer League titles. .

== Club foundation ==
The initial foundations of the club were set down in 1952 by a small group of Croatian immigrants who met at the home of Hinko Durakovic at 7 Leeds Street in the western suburb of Footscray to discuss the formation of a Croatian soccer club. The founders of the club were Perica Filipovic (the first President of the club), Ivica Matosevic, Tonika Durakovic, Drago Jukic and Hinko Durakovic. The club was given the name SC Croatia and from the very beginning it was decided the club's colours would be the tri-colours of the Croatian flag (which continues to this day); red jerseys, white shorts and blue socks. An initial difficulty in fielding teams led SC Croatia to recruit players from various suburbs across Melbourne, as well as from outside the city in Geelong and even the Bonegilla Migrant Reception and Training Centre in north-eastern Victoria. The club went as far as to meet arriving boats of immigrants at ports in Melbourne and Geelong to recruit players. Despite these initial difficulties the club quickly became successful, making its playing debut on 10 April 1953. In 1954 the club became an affiliate of the state's governing body Victorian Amateur Soccer Football Association, which saw SC Croatia join and compete in a league competition for the first time that same year in the newly created Victorian Provisional League (a league for amateur clubs). The club's opening match took place on 1 May 1954 against BWR, which finished 3-3. The club's first win coming the week after on 8 May, with a 4–1 victory over Box Hill. It was a successful debut year for the club as they finished second, four points behind the league champions South Yarra. Also in 1954 SC Croatia participated in its first Dockerty Cup, the young club was knocked out in the opening round losing to Yallourn 12–1.

== The early years ==
In 1957 after the conclusion of the season SC Croatia led by Joe Radojevic shifted its base to Geelong, where it would remain until 1962, which had become a hub for the Croatian community. SC Croatia amalgamated with the Croatia club of Geelong which had been founded in 1954. For those years in Geelong the club's home ground was initially at Separation Street in North Geelong before making the move to Corio Oval. SC Croatia quickly moved up the state divisions, and by 1959 they were in Division 1 just outside the premier competition of the State League. The club's first title came in 1959, winning the Division 1 championship over Preston on goal difference. That season included SC Croatia's club record 29–1 victory over Brunswick, one of the highest scores ever recorded in a senior Australian football match. With three rounds to go in the season Preston led the league by a point from the second place Lions and two points ahead of SC Croatia in third. SC Croatia had to win all of the three remaining games to take the title, which included two matches against the Lions. SC Croatia was successful as it won the 3 matches, defeating the Lions 3-0 and 3–1 to clinch the title by a point over Preston. That year SC Croatia also made the 5th round of the Dockerty Cup, the furthest the club had been in the competition up until that point. Controversy embroiled the league in its post-season, which saw SC Croatia stripped of its Division 1 title after a successful appeal by the second placed Preston to overturn a result earlier in the season in their match against the Lions. The title was handed to Preston, whom gained promotion to the Victorian State League.

It was a bitter blow to the club, made worse by the fact the club was only informed they would not be competing in the Victorian Soccer League a month before the start of the 1960 season. The Preston club having not expected to be participating in the top league and was not prepared for the move, having lost the bulk of its squad. In an act of desperation the president of the Preston club contacted the president of SC Croatia, Joe Radojevic, to merge the two clubs. This was a move not supported by many at SC Croatia, so a vote was taken by the committee. The vote was very close, going just in favour of not merging. But unknown to members of the committee Joe Radojevic had already arranged the merger with the Federation and had 8 SC Croatia players transferred to the Preston club. Radojevic had also hoped to sell the club's Division 1 spot to Makedonia. This decision was met with much anger and caused a split within the club, seeing SC Croatia remain in Geelong playing in Division 1, while Radojevic's breakaway faction played in Melbourne under the name of Preston Croat (a name officially adopted in 1961) in the Victorian State League. So for the next three seasons (1960–1962) the two clubs remained separate entities. SC Croatia, following the split, having lost the bulk of its squad merged with the Zagreb club from Geelong (founded in 1958) allowing it to be able to field a side for the season.

Despite the controversy of the split, the club's initial years of the 1950s had proven to be overwhelmingly successful, with the club finishing in the top 2 on five occasions in its first 6 seasons. The 1950s saw the club have its highest points per game ratio of any decade in its history (2.16 points per game), and an impressive 68% win ratio.

Preston Croat's inaugural State League season in 1960 ended with the club finishing 2nd to last and relegated to Division 1. In the 1961 season they were undefeated in pursuit of the Division 1 South title and promoted to the top flight for next season. SC Croatia would finish 3rd and only 3 points behind Preston Croat and fail to promote.

The 1961 season ended would bring turmoil to the Victorian soccer landscape. VASFA was faced with opposition to how the league was run, and the 12 State League clubs (now with Preston Croat among them) decided to breakaway and join the rebel Victorian Soccer Federation although many clubs playing below the State League, including SC Croatia, initially sided with the VASFA. Preston Croat poach players from SC Croatia; the VSF proved to be a more attractive set-up for players. By February 1962 the VSF gain control of the sport in Victoria when VASFA collapsed and disbanded. All VASFA clubs in Victoria then joined the VSF.

The 1962 State League season proved to be difficult for Preston Croat, the club avoided relegation by 2 points. The pre-season 1962 Ampol Cup results gave Preston Croat promise when it made the semi-finals. That year saw Preston Croat goalkeeper Ilija Djukic become the club's first representative player, as he was selected in the Victorian state team squad to take on South Australia. SC Croatia on the other hand in 1962 took out the Division 1 title comfortably, winning 19 of its 22 matches. That amazing season saw the debut of club legend Billy Vojtek at the young age of 18. Vojtek had an incredible debut season for SC Croatia as he took out both the club's top goal-scorer and player of year honours. The 1962 season also saw SC Croatia move back to Melbourne, playing out of Tracey's Speedway in Maribyrnong.

With both clubs set to compete in the State League in 1963 factions at both clubs saw it as an opportunity for the two clubs to finally re-unite. Many at SC Croatia were still angry over the 1960 incident, but eventually terms were agreed to and the two clubs re-united under the banner of SC Croatia. Despite the high expectations within the Croatian community the club finished a disappointing 11th in its inaugural season as a re-united side in the State League, being relegated back to Division 1. The highlight of the disappointing year was SC Croatia making the semi-finals of the Dockerty Cup. At the conclusion of the 1963 season SC Croatia president Enver Begovic and the President of Richmond Allemania took legal action against the VSF, arguing that the decision to relegate their respective clubs was unconstitutional. The courts decision went against the two clubs, seeing both relegated. SC Croatia would quickly return to the State League for the 1965 season after once more winning the Division 1 title in 1964, they lost only one match that season. SC Croatia clinched the 1964 title on the final day against Preston Makedonia. In the lead-up to the pivotal game the team manager Frank Burin travelled to Sydney and arranged for six players from Sydney Croatia to play in the one-off match. Unfortunately the clearance for the players failed to come through on time, though in the end it would not matter in the outcome. SC Croatia and Makedonia went into the match on equal points, in the thrilling match SC Croatia came out on top defeating Makedonia 3–1 in front of 4,000 people at a ground in Port Melbourne. Goals came from Billy Vojtek with a double, and Horst Rau. Notably Northern Irishman Ollie Norris joined the club for the 1964 season. During the 1950s Norris had played in the English Division 1 (now Premier League) with Middlesbrough, and was part of the giant killing AFC Bournemouth team of 1957 which made the quarter-finals of the FA Cup. Norris was the most high-profile player SC Croatia had up until this point in the club's history.

Many of the early club legends of SC Croatia played and began their careers during this initial era of the club, the most prominent of these individuals being Bozo Bašić, Frank Bot, Billy Vojtek, Jim Vojtek, Mirko Kovaček and Horst Rau.

== A Victorian powerhouse 1965-1972 ==
With SC Croatia's return to the State League in 1965 the club would cement itself as one of the states most powerful sides under the guidance, for the most part, of long-time coach Mijo Kis. Between 1965 and 1972, SC Croatia finished in the top 4 five times and won 9 titles. In its three previous seasons in the State League the club had struggled and the 1965 season looked like this would continue with SC Croatia losing 6 of its first 9 matches of the season as relegation was being faced once more. The club president at the time Enver Begović reacted by spending over 5000 pounds to bring in players such as Scottish international Duncan MacKay, Brian Adlam, Hammy McMeechan (who was bought for a then Victorian record transfer fee of 1200 pounds from Slavia), Bill McLyntyre, Joe Keenan, Bobby McLachlan and Ian Currie. The club went to great lengths to bring in these players, sending Frank Burin to Scotland to sign the majority of the newcomers. These incredible signings saw the club dubbed the 'Glamour Team' of the State League. In the final 13 matches of the season the club won 10 of the matches and had the best record, picking up the most points, of any team in the State League over that period. They even defeated the top 3 sides, South Melbourne SC, Sunshine George Cross and Brunswick Juventus. Despite all this the club finished 6th as the damage at the start of the season was too much to overcome. Croatia also made the final of the Dockerty Cup for the first time, losing 1–0 to Slavia. They defeated their arch rivals Footscray JUST 2–1 in the semi-final.

In the 1966 season, SC Croatia strengthened its already powerful side, bringing in Jimmy Mackay and Bill MacArthur. The club continued its great form from the second half of the previous season. With 3 games remaining SC Croatia was sitting in 3rd spot, only 2 points behind the first placed South Melbourne SC. Unfortunately SC Croatia crumbled under the pressure, losing all 3 matches to finish fifth and just miss out on the top 4 qualification for the Australia Cup. That year also saw the club when its first cup title as the Reserves side won the Armstrong Cup, defeating rivals Footscray JUST in the final.

In 1967 SC Croatia found itself well off the pace after Round 10, sitting in 7th position. But the final 12 matches of the season saw the club rally as it went on an impressive run that saw it only lose 2 of those remaining 12 matches as they climbed all the way up to 3rd spot, its highest league finish. This first ever top 4 finish saw SC Croatia qualify for the prestigious Australia Cup, a national knock-out soccer tournament featuring the 16 best clubs in the country. SC Croatia won its opening round match 2–0 away to West Adelaide Hellas at Hindmarsh Stadium. SC Croatia was eventually knocked out in the quarter-finals, losing against Brunswick Juventus.

In 1968 all the hard work of previous years finally paid off with what was the high point of this era, when SC Croatia won its first Victorian State League championship. Under the captaincy of Horst Rau (the club's longest serving captain) SC Croatia was dominant winning 15 of its 22 matches, and finishing 7 points clear of the second-place Polonia. The club had finally lived up to its tag as the 'Glamour Team'. It was a remarkable achievement particularly given that the club was sitting in 5th position by Round 10, a massive 5 points behind the league leaders at the time Hakoah Melbourne. From that point onwards SC Croatia went undefeated for the rest of the season, winning 10 of the final 12 matches of the season.

1968 also saw SC Croatia win the prestigious Dockerty Cup (defeating South Melbourne 1–0 in the final in front of 18,000 people at Olympic Park), as well as the Ampol Cup to complete a remarkable treble. SC Croatia is one of only two sides to ever achieve that treble, the other being Green Gully in 1981. SC Croatia also narrowly lost the Inter City Cup to Hakoah Eastern Suburbs of Sydney 3–2 at Olympic Park. Finally in 1968 SC Croatia competed in its second Australia Cup in what would be the last tournament staged. In the opening round SC Croatia faced Adelaide Juventus at Olympic Park, winning 3–1. The club's run would end in the quarter-finals, losing to eventual tournament Runner-Up Hakoah Melbourne. In the end, 1968 proved to be an outstanding season where SC Croatia truly came of age, cementing itself as one of the most powerful clubs in the country.

Following the completion of the 1968 season, SC Croatia was part of a consortium of 9 clubs (Melbourne sides Hakoah, Hellas and George Cross, Sydney sides APIA, Prague, Hakoah, Sydney Croatia and Pan Hellenic) from both Victoria and NSW that announced their intention to organize a 12 team national league to begin in 1969. The proposed league did not eventuate.

The following two seasons of 1969 and 1970, while not being as successful as the landmark season of 1968, saw the club continue to consolidate its position as one of Australia's strongest sides despite the loss of key figures from the 1968 side such as Hammy McMeechan, Alfred Glaser, Tommy Friganovic and Robert Symington. SC Croatia finished a respectable 4th in both 1969 and 1970, qualifying for the top 4 State League Cup in both seasons. Croatia also had success in cup competitions in 1969, in the pre-season Ampol Cup SC Croatia lost in the final to South Melbourne Hellas 2–1 in front of 15,000 fans at Olympic Park. While the club would go on to defend its Dockerty Cup title in 1969 defeating Brunswick Juventus 3–1 in the Final. The back-to-back Dockerty titles were an achievement that at that time had not been achieved by their more fancied and bitter rivals Footscray JUST and South Melbourne Hellas. The 1970 State League season saw an exciting finish in the closing stages for SC Croatia. The final spot in the top 4 cup series was up for grabs between the club and South Melbourne Hellas. With only two matches remaining SC Croatia was in 4th spot on 26 points, while Hellas was in 5th on 24 points. Both the remaining matches would see SC Croatia play Hellas, this was due to the earlier encounter in the season being postponed. Due to Croatia's superior goal difference, Croatia would only need to gain a draw in one of the matches to clinch the top 4 spot. The first clash was contested mid-week and it proved to be a remarkable match which saw Hellas leading 3-1 early in the second half. Croatia bravely fought back, equalising on the 80th minute through Bill McLyntyre to see the match finish 3-3 and ensure a top 4 spot.

1971 was a year that proved to be another highlight for the club. Before the start of the season the club showed itself to be the firm favourites by taking out the Victorian Ampol Cup, defeating bitter rivals Footscray JUST 5–1 in the final. The club took this form into the State League season, after round 15 SC Croatia was equal first along with Footscray JUST. Both sides dominated the competition; SC Croatia had won 11 of those matches and lost only 2. But the club capitulated in the final 7 rounds, picking up only 3 points to finish 3rd behind Footscray JUST and South Melbourne Hellas. But SC Croatia got its revenge and proved it was the best side in Victoria by winning the State League Cup, a tournament played at the end of the season featuring the top four sides in the State League. This was very much like the playoffs system but it did not count as an official league championship at the time. SC Croatia defeated South Melbourne SC 3–2 in the Grand Final at Olympic Park.

1971 also saw SC Croatia qualify for the Inter City Cup final, which was a match that took place between the respective Victorian and New South Wales Ampol Cup champions. This at the time was the only national club title available. SC Croatia won the Inter City Cup defeating Western Suburbs of Sydney over two legs. The first leg in Melbourne ended in a 1–1 draw, but SC Croatia won the second leg in Sydney, defeating Western Suburbs 3–1 with a hat-trick from Bill McLyntyre. The win saw SC Croatia hold the unofficial mantle as the best club in the country. They again made the Inter City Cup final the following year, but lost to St George Budapest. SC Croatia lost 4–1 in Sydney and 1–0 in Melbourne.

The strength of the club during this period was particularly shown by a number of its players representing Australia in international football. The first came in 1965 with Hammy McMeechan becoming the club's first international representative. In 1967 Billy Vojtek would follow, becoming the first player of Croatian heritage to play for Australia. In 1970 Jimmy Mackay would become another SC Croatia player to wear the Green and Gold, he became an integral part of Australia's side that went to the 1974 World Cup. Other notable players during this era included Scottish international Duncan Mackay, Bill McLyntyre, Brian Adlam, Hugh Gunn, Bill McArthur, Frank Bot, Ante Kuželek, Bobby McLachlan, Mirko Kovaček, Welsh international Peter Davies (who joined in the side in 1968) and there was even a short stint from Yugoslavian international Stjepan Lamza during the 1972 season.

== Expulsion ==
1972 would be a dark year in SC Croatia's history. On 30 July 1972 SC Croatia played Hakoah at Olympic Park in Round 19 of the VPL. The match was abandoned after the 62-minute mark after SC Croatia supporters invaded the pitch, attacking the match officials following the sending off of SC Croatia player Hugh Gunn. At the VSF Tribunal SC Croatia was found guilty of having failed to control its spectators, the club had its membership with the VSF revoked which saw it disqualified from all competitions for life. The club appealed the decision and the ban was reduced to the end of the season. It was the first time such a ruling had been handed down in Australian football, the decision saw the club forfeit its final three matches of the season. Before the Hakoah match SC Croatia was sitting in 5th spot, still a chance of making the top 4 State League Cup. SC Croatia felt it had been victimised, with the decision having more to do with politics as accusations of interference were made against Tony Kovac the president of bitter rivals Footscray JUST. The VSF as part of their ruling allowed for SC Croatia to apply for re-admission into the VSF after the conclusion of the season, and on 22 August the club sent in their application. After reviewing the application the VSF rejected it, causing further anger within the Croatian community. As a consequence the club chose to go down the legal avenue taking the VSF to the Supreme Court of Victoria in 1973, but the club would end up losing the case.

Throughout 1973 the club held weekly meetings despite having no side competing, also a SC Croatia old-boys team played friendly matches against local sides. In 1974 club members chose to go down a different path to bring the club back, they set their sights on a take-over of the financially struggling Division 1 club Essendon Lions (a Ukrainian backed club). The first step occurred with the appointment of the influential SC Croatia figure Tony Vrzina as coach of the Essendon Lions late in the 1974 season, rescuing the club from relegation. With the completion of the season a total take-over of the club took place, with Croatia paying $25,000 to the Lions to take control of the club and the facilities at Montgomery Park in Essendon. By the beginning of the 1975 season Tony Vrzina had become president of the club and Duje Zemunik was appointed coach, after Billy McArthur resigned. The club would become known as Essendon Croatia, though they would continue to play under the Lions name until 1978 when the name was officially changed to Essendon Croatia. Essendon Croatia's time in Division 1 did not see much success for the club, with the most successful season coming in 1976 when the club finished 3rd. That year the club also made the semi-finals of the Dockerty Cup where they lost to Polonia.

The club's time in Division 1 was marked by re-building, the drop and eventual take over of Essendon Lions saw most of the club's previous State League players leave. But none-the-less the club continued to soldier on. In 1974 the club staged the first 'unofficial' Australian-Croatian Soccer Tournament at Montgomery Park with 6 clubs competing; this was a precursor to the official tournament which would take place the following year. Also the club's youth system was producing great young talent during this time that would go on to have a deep influence on Australian football, namely Eddie Krnčević and Branko Čulina. This culminated in the club's Reserve side winning the Division 1 Reserves Championship in 1976. Also during this time the club lost none of its ambition, shown in 1976 with the signings of high-profile State League players such as Nick Kuzmamov, goalkeeper John Kennedy, Ivan Gruicic and the legendary John Gardiner from the George Cross for a then record fee of $6,000.

== The return 1977-1983 ==
1977 saw the creation of the National Soccer League, four sides from Victoria entered the NSL. This exodus from the State League allowed the return of Essendon Croatia to the top flight of Victorian football after a 4-year absence. 1977 saw the club's favourite son, Billy Vojtek, return to Essendon Croatia to help them get back to the top. The club's first season back was marked by mixed results. The club started the season as one of the favourites after having won the pre-season Ampol Cup, it was the first and only time that a newly promoted side had lifted the trophy. But early season player losses to NSL clubs, Ivan Gruičić to Canberra City FC and John Gardiner to South Melbourne SC (for $13,000), saw the club have a sluggish start to the State League winning only 2 of its first 12 matches. Club legend Duncan MacKay was brought in as coach, he introduced a number of new players including New Zealand international Brian Davidson and Steve Kokoska from Sunshine City. MacKay's influence had a deep impact with the club having a great second half of the season as Essendon Croatia won 6 of its final 10 matches, to finish a respectable seventh. The club also went on to make the Final of the Dockerty Cup, losing to Brunswick Juventus.

Shortly after this, the club became dominant in the state again. In 1978 the club won its second Victorian State League championship under the guidance of coach and former club great Bill McArthur; the side won an impressive 17 of its 22 matches. The powerful side was one of the most dominant Victoria had seen, and they had clinched the title with 3 matches still remaining. That year the club took out the much sought after treble of Ampol Cup, Victorian champions and State League Cup (where it defeated George Cross 3–2), an achievement which no other club has ever been able to achieve. The club also made the semi-finals of the Dockerty Cup. Essendon Croatia defended its State League title in 1979 under the dual guidance of Duje Zemunik and player-coach John Gardiner. It proved to be a much tighter race than the previous year. Frankston City had led the league comfortably for most of the season, with the completion of round 17 seeing Frankston 5 points ahead of Essendon Croatia who were sitting in 3rd position. In the remaining 5 matches Essendon Croatia went undefeated as it won 4 and drew 1, clinching the league title on a dramatic final day (defeating Altona City 3–1) on goal difference over Frankston City. That year Essendon Croatia took out the prestigious treble; State Champions, Dockerty Cup and the State League Cup where it defeated Preston Makedonia 2–1. The success was made more remarkable given the club started the 1979 season in turmoil with mass players losses as Yaka Banovic and Eddie Krencevic transferred to National Soccer League clubs, while also losing four other players including Billy Vojtek and Brian Davidson. In its first three seasons back in the State League Essendon Croatia won every title that was available, which was impressive from a club that was almost dead only a few years earlier. It was a testament to the dedication of the Croatian community.

This back to back championship winning side contained 5 Socceroos; Ken Murphy, Tommy Cumming, Billy Vojtek, Eddie Krnčević and Steve Kokoska. Teenage star Eddie Krnčević made his senior debut at 16 for the club in 1977. He would become one of Australia's first overseas success stories. Eddie Krnčević headed to Europe in 1981, joining Croatia's Dinamo Zagreb, and he would spend nearly 15 years playing across Europe. However the stand out player of the back-to-back winning side was without a doubt the English forward Tommy Cumming who was signed from Sunshine City for $6,500, he won the Player of the Year award in both 78 and 79.

From 1980 to 1983, the club painfully finished runner-up on four successive occasions. In 1980 they finished second to Preston Makedonia, managed by former Essendon Croatia boss Brian Edgley, who had been replaced by Duje Zemunik midway through the previous season. Despite having a fantastic season where Essendon Croatia only lost 2 matches (both losses being to the eventual champions Preston). It was a close battle between the two sides for a large part of the season. After round 14 both Essendon Croatia and Preston Makedonia found themselves on equal points with Preston just ahead on goal difference, the following round saw the two sides face off. Preston won the crucial match 1-0 as they pulled away from Essendon Croatia, holding onto top spot for the rest of the season.

The next three seasons saw the club finish runner-up to Green Gully each season. The season of 1981 saw Essendon Croatia finish 6 points behind Green Gully, who were now led by player-coach and former Croatia player John Gardiner. It proved to be a season of high frustration for Essendon Croatia with the club going through three different coaches as the high expectations of the club were not being met. The club started the season slowly but soon made up ground as a tight battle ensued with league leaders Green Gully. It was neck and neck until late into the season when Essendon Croatia capitulated following a 2–0 defeat at the hands of Green Gully in Round 20. Notably 1981 also saw David Brogan join Essendon Croatia from Croydon City midway through the season, he would go on to become one of the club's most prolific strikers in its long history.

In 1982 the club changed its name to Melbourne Croatia. For the 82 season Bill McArthur was at the helm as coach of Melbourne Croatia. The club kicked off the season with an 8 match unbeaten streak. In round 9 the club lost 4–2 to main title rivals Green Gully, to record the club's first loss of the season. The solitary loss resulted surprisingly in McArthur's sacking. Up to round 12 the club was on equal points with Green Gully, but inconsistent results would follow for the rest of the season which saw the club fall behind Green Gully by a clear margin. In Round 15 legendary coach Mijo Kiss made a return to the club after an absence of over a decade. Though his return wasn't enough to catch the runaway Green Gully, he was able to hold onto second place and lead the side to a triumphant 4–1 win over Green Gully in round 22. The 1982 season saw Josip Biskic make an incredible impact on his debut season, the beginning of a career which would see Biskic end up playing a club record 328 matches.

1983 saw the club came agonisingly close, losing the title by one point. At this stage the point system in the State League was 2 points for a win and 1 for a draw. If it had been done by today's system of 3 points for a win Melbourne Croatia would have won the title on goal difference. That season Melbourne Croatia, now being coached by the returning John Gardiner, led Green Gully on the ladder for the first 19 rounds, being on top of the table for 18 of those weeks. A Round 20 loss to Brunswick Juventus would prove disastrous for the championship hopes of Melbourne Croatia. The club led 2-0 only to have Juventus come back and win 3–2, giving Green Gully top spot. Croatia would go on to win all 6 of its remaining matches, but still it wasn't enough.

During the period of 1980-1983 Melbourne Croatia would make up for falling short so many times in the League by winning the end of year State League Cup in 1980, 1981 (defeating Doveton 3–1 in the final) and 1983 where the club gained its sweetest revenge defeating Green Gully 4–0 in the Final. The club had further success in cup competitions during this period as it won the Dockerty Cup in 1980 and 1983, and the Ampol Cup in 1980.

Also during this period Melbourne Croatia and its sister club Sydney Croatia were controversially denied entry into the NSL despite dominating their respective state competitions. Lesser clubs, with much smaller supporter bases were given priority over the two powerful Croatia clubs. In 1976 Melbourne Croatia was one of seven Victorian clubs to apply for the NSL: the others being Moorolbark, George Cross, Brunswick Juventus, South Melbourne Hellas, Footscray JUST and Fitzroy Alexander. The Australian Soccer Federation stressed the point that neither club would be welcome till they dropped 'Croatia' from their respective names.

Despite the snub from the ASF Melbourne Croatia showed its ability on the national level by participating in the National Soccer League Cup, which was open to the top state league sides for a short period, each year from 1978 to 1981. The club's best performance came in 1978 when the club made it to the quarter-finals. A notable victory came in the second round where they defeated Beograd, a Serbian backed club from Adelaide, 3–0. In the quarter-finals the club faced NSL side Adelaide City. Melbourne Croatia put up a brave fight, narrowly going down 1–0 to their more fancied opponents. Croatia proudly made it to at least the second round each time it participated in the Cup, except for 1980 when it was knocked out in the first round by Heidelberg United. That year Heidelberg United had finished 2nd in the NSL, Croatia once again showed the strength of Victorian State League football by pushing them all the way, eventually losing 3–2.

The 1980 Ampol Cup victory was also notable for the club's performances against Melbourne's NSL sides. In the semi-final Melbourne Croatia defeated a full strength South Melbourne NSL side 1-0 and then went on to defeat a full strength Heidelberg NSL side in the final 2–1. The result so infuriated and caused embarrassment for South Melbourne that the president of South, Sam Papasavas, came out in the local media demanding a re-match with a bet of $5,000.

Great players from this era not already mentioned included Peter Blasby, Branko Čulina, Ante Bilaver, Josip Biškić, Steve Short, Carl Gilder, Steve Gojević, Ivan Gruičić, George Hannah, Noel Mitten and Keith Adams.

== National Soccer League ==
=== 1984 NSL entry ===
Finally in 1984 economics gave the club what lobbying could not. The NSL had been struggling financially, with dwindling crowds. So as a solution the Federation reverted from a one division competition of 16 teams, to a duel conference set-up (North and South) with each conference consisting of twelve teams. With the expansion the club could no longer be ignored and entry to the NSL was finally given. For the 1984 season the club had a squad made up mostly of players from their 1983 state league season, including Steve Gojević, Josip Biskic, Tommy Cumming, Keith Adams, David Brogan, Peter Blasby and George Hannah. The club had a major coup singing legendary Welsh footballer Terry Hennessey as coach. The club would go on to make an incredible impact on debut, finishing 3rd in the regular season and qualifying for the finals, just showing what a strong side the club had in the State League. The highlight of the regular season was the club's 12 match unbeaten streak, a record for the club in the NSL. But the season didn't start off in such an amazing manner, winning only 3 of its opening 11 matches.

Hennessey was sacked after round 9 and the experienced Tony Vrzina (who had a couple of coaching stints with the club in the 1970s) came in at round 13 seeing a massive turnaround in the club's fortunes. In the finals, Melbourne Croatia made it to the Major Semi-final where they faced South Melbourne for a spot in the Conference Grand Final. South Melbourne FC won 3–2 in extra-time in a thrilling match in front of 11,000 fans at Olympic Park. It was a painful loss as Melbourne Croatia had led for a large part of the game only to have South Melbourne FC equalise in the closing minutes to take it to extra-time. Melbourne Croatia with a second chance then faced Heidelberg United, again for a spot in the final against South Melbourne FC. Heidelberg United won 3-1 putting an end to Melbourne Croatia's finals campaign. Melbourne Croatia also made the NSL Cup final that season, winning 5 matches in a row before losing to Newcastle KB United in the Final. That year also saw Melbourne Croatia reach the Final of the Buffalo Cup, where it lost 3–1 to South Melbourne in front of 13,000 people at Olympic Park.

In 1985 under coach Dom Kapetanovic the club would continue its good form again making the finals, but this time being knocked out in the first match by Preston 2–1 at Olympic Park in front of 6,000 spectators. 1985 saw the club once again lose the Buffalo Cup Final, this time to Heidelberg in a 5-1 thrashing. And the club would gain revenge against Preston, taking out the Dockerty Cup with a 2–0 victory over the Macedonian club.

The next three years were very disappointing for the club, they missed out on finals action each season (though there was no finals series in 1987). This was despite some major signings such as in 1987 under Terry Hennessey (in his second stint as coach), when the club signed Socceroos Robbie Dunn and Alan Edward Davidson, Croatian import Branko Milošević and a major coup in Scottish international Ian Wallace. As well as in 1988 with Socceroos Jeff Olver and Theo Selemidis, and experienced Scotsman Paul Donnelly. But on the park the club still struggled during this period of 1986-1988 despite having one of the strongest squads in the NSL, the club had become the perennial underachievers of the league. So frustrating was this period for the club that over those three seasons Melbourne Croatia had five different coaches. In the 1987 season Melbourne Croatia had been competitive for most of the season, by the end of round 23 the club was in 5th position only two points behind 2nd place. But the club picked up no further points in the remaining 3 rounds of the season as the club fell away to 9th. 1988 was a very similar story, Ian Wallace had taken charge as coach and at the round 19 mark the club was sitting in 6th only a point outside a finals spot. But the club fell out of finals contention as it went on to lose 5 of its final 7 matches. One positive that came out of this period was Mark Talajić, a product of the club's youth system, who made his debut for the side at only 16 in 1986. He would go on to become a club legend.

However, this period did see the club have success in cup competitions, dominating the pre-season Buffalo Cup (which had replaced the Ampol Cup) with victories in 1986 and 1987. Rather fittingly the victories came against Heidelberg and South Melbourne respectively, the two clubs to whom Melbourne Croatia had lost to in 1984 and 1985. Those victories in the Buffalo Cup earned the club a spot in the Final for the Ansett Cup against the NSW pre-season Champions. Ironically both years saw Melbourne Croatia take on Sydney Croatia for the Ansett Cup title. In 1986 Melbourne Croatia defeated their Sydney sister club 3–1 at Olympic Park in front 8,500 fans. The following year the club again defeated Sydney Croatia, this time 1–0 at the St George Stadium in Sydney. In 1988 the club also won the Dockerty Cup in a thrilling Final against South Melbourne, which saw Melbourne Croatia come out on top 4-3 after extra-time. The club was later stripped of the title after a protest by South Melbourne, as Melbourne Croatia had fielded an ineligible player.

=== Dominance ===
After those three painful years of non-finals action, 1989 saw the beginning of as golden era for the club. For the next decade the club would make the NSL finals eight times in nine seasons.

In 1989, everything began to click for the club. It strengthened an already impressive side with imports Željko Adžić and Francis Awaritefe, as well as Ivan Kelić and Ivan Duzel from sister club St Albans Dinamo. The club had a strong season, finishing fourth on the regular season table and making the finals for the first time since 1985. In the finals, the club defeated Preston 2–0, which was followed by an agonising 3–2 loss to Sydney Olympic in extra time that put an end to Melbourne Croatia's campaign. 1989 also saw Melbourne Croatia move away from Olympic Park to its own stadium, the Melbourne Croatia Sports Centre in North Sunshine. That move saw a dramatic increase in crowds.

For the season 1989/90, Melbourne Croatia continued to impress, strengthening their side with Andrew Marth from Sunshine George Cross. The club finished 3rd in the regular season, just 3 points behind top spot. In the Finals Melbourne Croatia defeated South Melbourne in an epic penalty shootout, with a 7–6 scoreline. The club just missed out on making the Grand Final, losing the preliminary final to Sydney Olympic. Melbourne Croatia had taken a 1–0 lead, only to have Sydney Olympic claw their way back and score the winner nine minutes from full-time.

In 1990/91, the club had its most successful season in the NSL up to that point. With Ken Worden as coach the club won the minor premiership for the first time after having an amazing season, in which it lost only four matches. The club clinched the minor premiership with a game to spare following an 8-1 thrashing of Wollongong Macedonia, a match in which star striker Ivan Kelic scored six goals. The club went on to make their first Grand Final appearance, meeting city rivals South Melbourne FC at Olympic Park in front of over 23,000 fans. It was a match that Melbourne Croatia came agonisingly close to winning, leading for most of the match before conceding an equaliser with only minutes to go. The match went to a penalty shoot out, in which Melbourne Croatia led 2-1 following South Melbourne FC missing three consecutive penalties. Melbourne Croatia had two penalty kicks to win the game, but both were missed and the club lost the shootout 5–4.

=== Changes of name ===
The 1991/92 season saw the governing body Soccer Australia begin to implement measures to de-ethnicise the NSL to give it more mainstream appeal. Clubs had to replace their ethnic names, and Melbourne Croatia became Melbourne Croatia Soccer Club. That season saw former club legend and Socceroo, Ken Murphy, take over as coach. Under his tenure, the club won the minor premiership once more, but again lost the Grand Final on penalties at Olympic Park, this time to Adelaide City. During that period, the club continued to produce young talent and introduce them into their side. Mark Silić made his debut aged 18 in 1990/91, while Oliver Pondeljak made his debut at the age of 19 in 1991/92.

The 1992/93 season was a disappointing one, with the club failing to make the finals and finishing in 10th position. A lot of this had to do with the loss of a number of key players, Alan Edward Davidson, Francis Awaritefe, Damian Mori and Branko Milošević. Even with those losses the club still had a strong side that should have done better. The signs were positive early on. After round 7, the club was sitting in third spot, only a point from the top but, after that, the season unravelled, and the club tumbled down the ladder. Former Knights player Branko Culina, who was the coach at the time, was sacked after 17 matches following the disappointing results. After Culina's sacking, the club saw a late resurgence and, by the end of round 22, the club was sitting in 7th position, just a point outside a top six finals spot. The club fell away from finals contention as it struggled in the remaining four matches, only picking up three points. Despite the poor season. the club saw some positives, with even more new talent emerging in Mark Viduka, Steve Horvat, Adrian Cervinski and David Cervinski (Cervinski joined the club in the following season) and Vinko Buljubašić, as well as the signing of Fausto De Amicis.

In the 1993/94 season, Soccer Australia continued its campaign to remove ethnic names from the sport in Australia. It ruled that Melbourne Croatia Soccer Club was still too "ethnic", leading to the club changing its name once more, this time to the Melbourne Knights. To remedy the previous year's poor display, the Knights looked to Croatia for help, bringing coach Mirko Bazić out to Australia. His influence had a major impact, and the Knights dominated the season, easily winning their third Minor Premiership, six points ahead of second-placed South Melbourne. Future Socceroo captain Mark Viduka made a significant impact that season. At only 18 years of age, he finished the season as the NSL's top goal scorer with 17 goals. He became the only player to win the treble of individual awards: Player of the Year, Under 21 Player of the Year and Top Goal-scorer. He achieved all that despite controversially missing nine matches due to International duty with the Australian youth team. But the Grand Final saw a repeat of the events of 1991/92, with the team again losing to Adelaide City at Olympic Park. Cruelly, it was former Knights player Damian Mori who scored the winner for Adelaide City. That made three Grand Final defeats in four years for the Melbourne Knights, earning the club the tag of "chokers".

=== Champions of Australia ===
1994/95 was the season when the long-awaited breakthrough was made. Once more the club was a dominant force during the season, the side played a style of football that was head and shoulders above the rest. The club started the season on fire, winning its first 7 matches, a record that is yet to be broken. Unfortunately long-time captain Josip Biskic left the club after round 20, signing with Malaysian club Selangor F.C. Coach Mirko Bazić using his contacts in Croatia brought in import Krešimir Marušić to cover the loss, and he had an immediate impact for the club. The club won the Minor Premiership, its fourth in 5 seasons.

The Knights had a sluggish start to its finals campaign, losing to Adelaide City over 2 legs. But the club soon made up for it, making the Grand Final after defeating South Melbourne FC 3–2 in the preliminary final in a thrilling match at Olympic Park, with Mark Viduka scoring a hat-trick. So for the third time the club met Adelaide City in the Grand Final, but this time in Adelaide at Hindmarsh Stadium. The Knights were dominant, winning 2–0 with goals from captain Andrew Marth and striker Joe Spiteri. It was an impressive season for the club, claiming the treble that year; the Cup (where they defeated Heidelberg United 6–0 in the final), the Minor Premiership and the League. They were the only side to have achieved the feat until 2009, when A-League side Melbourne Victory also won the domestic treble. The tag of choker was finally put to rest for the Melbourne Knights. Mark Viduka had another phenomenal season, this time scoring 21 goals and once again took out the treble of individual awards. No other player before or since has been such a dominant force on the national competition. But just as in the previous season there was controversy with Viduka missing 4 matches, which crucially including the first 2 matches of the finals series, due to international duty with the Australian Youth team.

Following the championship win, the club headed over to Japan for a series of matches against J-League sides. The Knights defeated Jubilo Iwata and more significantly Yokohama Flügels who were the Asian Super Cup champions at the time.

The Knights defended its NSL title the following year, despite having lost a number of players during the off-season; Mark Viduka to Dinamo Zagreb, Steve Horvat to Hajduk Split, Krešimir Marušić also returning to Croatia and the loss of their coach Mirko Bazic. Mirko Bazic was replaced by former Knights player Ian Dobson. These player losses were made up for with emerging talent in Josip Šimunić, Tom Pondeljak, Ante Kovačević and Ice Kutlesovski.

The 1995/96 season was an extremely tight one, with only 6 points separating first and sixth at the conclusion of the regular season. Melbourne Knights stormed home with 6 wins from its final 7 matches to finish second, only a point behind Minor Premiers Marconi Fairfield. In the finals the Melbourne Knights defeated Marconi over 2 legs, booking a spot in their 5th Grand Final. In the Grand Final the Knights met Marconi again, a match which it would go into missing three of its players due to international duty with the Olyroos; Joe Spiteri, Frank Juric and Danny Tiatto. The club defeated Marconi 2–1 at Olympic Park, their first Grand Final win in their home city. The Knights goals were scored by captain Andrew Marth and striker Adrian Cervinski. The final whistle was followed by jubilant celebrations as thousands of Melbourne Knights supporters invaded the pitch and mobbed the players. This back-to-back championship winning side is regarded by many as the greatest club side Australia has seen. Nine of the players would go on to play for the Australia national football team (Joe Spiteri, Mark Viduka, Frank Jurić, Steve Horvat, Fausto De Amicis, Tom Pondeljak, John Markovski, Andrew Marth and Danny Tiatto), as well as defender Josip Šimunić who would go on to play for the Croatia national football team at two World Cups.

=== End of an era ===
For the 1996/97 season the de-ethnicising continued under the helm of the Soccer Australia president David Hill, a key decision was the removal of ethnic symbols from club emblems. So the Melbourne Knights had to change their emblem, removing the Croatian Grb (coat of arms) that had adorned the club's emblem since 1953.

This was also the beginning of the decline of the side, the constant loss of its players began to catch up with the club. For the 1996/97 season the club lost Mark Silić, Frank Jurić, Fausto De Amicis, Danny Tiatto and Vinko Buljubašić, the side was decimated. But most importantly the club was no longer replenishing its ranks with new talent from its youth set up at the same rate as it had done in the past. As well as the club not being able to compete with the big dollars of the new non-ethnic clubs that would join the league over the next decade; professional clubs like Perth Glory, Parramatta Power and Carlton. These clubs paid huge salaries to players, the traditional clubs like the Melbourne Knights could not compete and they were priced out of the market. Before the start of the season the Knights won the Dockerty Cup, defeating the Altona Magic 4–2. The 1996/7 season saw the Knights just scrape into the finals after a come from behind 3–1 win against Perth Glory in the last round of the regular season. The finals proved to be too much for the side, as they lost comprehensively to rivals South Melbourne FC over 2 legs.

From 1997/98 to the final season of the NSL in 2003/04, the club only made the finals twice. The 1997/98 season saw the return of veterans Ivan Kelic and Alan Edward Davidson, as well as the loss of Josip Simunic to Hamburg SV in Germany, and David Červinski and Lubo Lapsansky to the newly formed Carlton SC. Despite another staggering string of player losses the Knights would still put up a brave fight, going onto narrowly miss the finals that season, losing their crucial final round match against Marconi.

The following two seasons were disastrous for a club so used to success, with the club finishing 12th in both seasons. Matters were made worse with captain Andrew Marth leaving the club in 1998/99, going to Carlton SC. He left the Knights due to his frustrations with the recruitment policy of the club, it was a devastating blow to the club. One highlight in this dark period came in the 1999/00 season when English legend Peter Beardsley came out for at two match guest stint at the club. His first match against South Melbourne FC at Knights Stadium attracted a record 11,500 people; unfortunately the side was thrashed 4–0.

The 2000/01 season was the most successful season during this period, a season that saw the return of championship players Andrew Marth, Steve Horvat and Ljubo Lapsanksy after the early season disbanding of Carlton SC. Coach and club legend Vlado Vanis led the side. He made a number of excellent signings, including forwards Joel Porter and Toto Da Costa. Vanis employed a very attacking style of football, playing 3 strikers; Joel Porter, Toto Da Costa and Adrian Cervinski. They went on to score 36 goals between them. Despite all this Vanis was surprisingly sacked by club president Harry Mrksa late in the season after the two clashed over a number of issues. Andrew Marth took over as player-coach and guided the club to the finals after finishing the regular season in 6th spot. In the finals the Knights took out Perth Glory over two thrilling legs and then narrowly lost to Sydney Olympic to finish the season in an impressive 4th position. The following year the Knights again made the finals, but were once more knocked out by Sydney Olympic over two legs.

By 2002/03 the club had once more lost much of their side, the loss of Joel Porter and Toto Da Costa was particularly painful and the club struggled as a consequence in its final 2 seasons in the NSL. There were a few positives such as Anthony Pelikan, who became the club's star player and one of the NSL's leading players during this time. The 2002/03 season also saw the legendary coach Mirko Bazic return from Croatia to take charge of the side for the last 6 matches of that season, which included a 1–0 victory over rivals South Melbourne at home in the big derby clash in front of 7,157 spectators. In the final season of the NSL (2003/04) the club finished second last, its worst finish ever in the NSL. Despite the poor finish, 9 of the players from the squad in following years would end up at A-League clubs (including 7 that would in subsequent years go on to play for Melbourne Victory).

The club's final NSL match was fittingly against sister club Sydney United on 29 February 2004. The match was played in front of a crowd of 8,423 at the Melbourne Croatia Sports Centre. It was an incredible atmosphere, a celebration of Croatian football in Australia. The match ended 0-0 and with the final whistle there was a mass pitch invasion by the fans of both clubs. The respective captains, Andrew Marth and Mark Rudan, were chaired off the ground.

== Return to State football ==
The NSL was disbanded in 2004 to make way for a new professional league, the A-League. The Melbourne Knights knowing they would not be part of this new league, opted not to bid for a spot in the A-League unlike the other ethnic clubs. The club dropped back to the state league, now called the Victorian Premier League. But the Knights along with South Melbourne FC were not allowed to enter the 2004 VPL season, with various clubs in a campaign led by former Socceroo and JUST player Ernie Tapai at Whittlesea blocking their entry. This was despite assurances from the majority of the VPL clubs prior to the vote that they would vote in support of the entry of the Melbourne Knights into the league.

The Knights went to the president of the new Football Federation Australia, Frank Lowy, for help. The club was told by Lowy that he and his organisation were powerless to do anything the help resolve the issue. As a consequence the club went over 12 months with no football and no source of revenue. This placed the club on the brink of financial ruin, so much so that the club was close to selling its stadium. The 12-month in-action also saw the club lose its entire squad on free transfers, including 3 players that went on to join A-League club Melbourne Victory (Daniel Piorkowski, Steve Pantelidis and Adrian Leijer). The club has never been compensated for these losses.

For the 2005 VPL season the club finally resumed its football. The Knights had to re-build a squad, creating a difficult first few seasons in the VPL. 2005 saw mixed results for the club as they finished 9th, at one stage challenging for a finals spot before falling away.

The 2006 season was disastrous. The side started off well, leading the competition in the early stages. Then the club was hit by crisis after crisis; board interference in player selection, three coaching changes and a player walkout, which nearly saw the club relegated. On a positive note there was the unearthing of an exciting new talent, Mate Dugandžić. He made his debut in the senior side at only 16 years of age making an impressive impact.

2007 was the year that saw a turnaround in the fortunes of the Melbourne Knights. Chris Taylor was appointed coach and strong recruiting by the club, including the signing of former NSL stars Steve Iosifidis and Joe Spiteri, saw the club go into the season with high hopes. Despite this it was a mixed start to the season for the club, only winning 2 of its opening 8 games. Soon after the club made 3 key signings; former Knights NSL player Anthony Pelikan from Oakleigh, 2006 under 21 VPL player of the year Daniel Visevic from Richmond and up-and-coming player Cameron Watson who had spent time at Portugal's FC Porto. These signings saw the club storm home, winning 7 of its final 9 matches and finishing second on the ladder, a point behind the Preston Lions.

In the finals the club lost to Preston, 1–0, in a tightly fought affair with Preston scoring the winner late in the game. The Knights then took on Oakleigh to keep their title hopes alive. The club proved their class with a strong 1–0 win. Finally the Melbourne Knights once more faced off against Preston, this time for a spot in the Grand Final against Whittlesea. The club lost 2–1 in a controversial match at Bob Jane Stadium. Anthony Pelikan was sent off just before half time, receiving a second yellow card for simulation. The Knights put on a brave performance in the second half. But a late strike from Preston against the run of play killed the game off despite a consolation goal deep in injury time. Overall it was a successful year for the club, finishing 3rd in what was the club's highest league finish in well over a decade. Also the club went on to win the under 21 and under 18 Victorian titles.

2008 season saw the club aim high once more. There were a number of changes in the squad, with Mate Dugandzic and Daniel Visevic being signed by Croatia's Dinamo Zagreb, and influential goalkeeper Adrian Cagalj transferring to Oakleigh. Players brought into the club included the return of Andrew Barisic from a year stint in Germany.

A stellar start to the season saw the Knights go on a club record in the state league with a 19 match unbeaten streak, seeing the club lead the league for a large part of the season. But injuries late in the campaign took their toll bringing the unbeaten streak to an end, with the side's midfield being decimated by the loss of Anthony Pelikan, Ivan Franjic and Cameron Watson, as well as the early season injury of influential captain Tom Milardovic. Eventually the Knights finished second just a point behind Minor Premiers Green Gully.

In the opening game of the finals the Knights took on Green Gully. The match ended 1-1 after extra time with the Knights taking out the match on penalties. Knights then took on the Altona Magic for a spot in the Grand Final. The match at Knights Stadium once more saw the game finish 1-1 and go to penalties. But it was Altona that took it out 4–3. Knights with a second chance at a Grand Final spot took on Heidelberg United, the Knights proved too strong winning 2–1. The Grand Final, the club's first in 12 years, took place at Bob Jane Stadium in front of 5,500 mostly Knights fans. The club went into the match still missing influential players Franjic and Pelikan, as well as striker Joe Spiteri missing the game due to suspension. It was a game that the Knights dominated, creating many chances but failing to convert them. The match finished 0-0 after 90 minutes and moved into extra match. With the match poised to go to penalties Altona snatched victory with barely a minute left in the match. One piece of consolation came with captain Craig Elvin winning the Jimmy Rooney man of the match award. Also striker Andrew Barisic had a stellar season scoring 19 goals, the most by a Knights player since Mark Viduka in 1994/95.

The 2009 VPL season started with a mass exodus of players, this most notably included Andrew Barisic to new A-League franchise Gold Coast United, as well as veterans Joe Spiteri and Steve Iosifidis dropping to lowers leagues to finish off their careers. A number of new recruits were brought in, with a strong focus on youth, which saw players brought from the reserves into the senior squad and a handful of players from the Melbourne Victory FC Youth team. The side was strengthened with the signings of a few more experienced players, such as Mate Dugandzic who returned from his stint in Croatia. The first half of the season was disastrous for the Knights, picking up 11 points from just as many matches as they sat third from bottom. The second half of the season saw a marked improvement from the club, as they came within throwing distance of the top 5 only to fall away late in the season.

The 2010 season will be remembered for activities off the field which saw the monumental return of the Grb to the Melbourne Knights emblem after an absence of almost 15 years; with the club reverting to the emblem worn during its back-to-back NSL championships of the mid 90s. The return to the classic emblem was fitting as the club celebrated the 15th anniversary of those championships, gathering the past players from that team (except Josip Simunic who was with the Croatia national team) for a gala night and reunion match.

On the field the 2010 VPL season proved to be an unsuccessful one. The year began with a complete clean out of players; only 3 players remained from the 2009 squad. The club had not seen such a clean out since it dropped out of the NSL in 2004. The task of re-building the side fell to former Knights player Ivan Duzel who took over from Chris Taylor as coach. What was implemented was a recruitment policy that saw a diverse range of players brought to the Knights, including imports such as the American-Croat Tomislav Skara, Englishman Kevin Townson and Frenchman Jean-Charles Dubois. Also there was the return of club legend Danny Tiatto, returning to finish off his career at the Knights.

The season itself was marred by inconsistency from the Knights as the club struggled and found itself near the bottom of the table for most of the season. With only 3 matches remaining the club was on the brink of relegation as it sat inside the bottom two. But the Knights ensured their placed in the VPL as it recorded its two most important victories of the season, defeating Bentleigh Greens 2–0 away and a 4–2 victory at home against Northcote City. After the season the club won a number of individual awards with Kevin Townson awarded the media voted Player of the Year award, while finishing runner-up for the Gold Medal VPL Player of the Year award. Adrian Zahra won the Under 21 Player of the Year award, soon after he was signed by A-League club Melbourne Heart. The post-season gave some cause for celebration as the club took out the Australian-Croatian Soccer Tournament in New Zealand, only the second time the club had won the cup.

In early 2011, the Knights took out the Victorian Croatian Cup, after defeating North Geelong Warriors FC 4–0 in the final. Around 800 people were in attendance, with fundraising actions in place to help sister club Rocklea United after their clubrooms were flooded in Queensland.

After a disappointing start to the 2011 VPL season, assistant coach Paul Magdic took over the head job, replacing Ivan Duzel who had been asked to step down. The tough season ended with a bitterly disappointing 10th-placed finish. Some relief was found in the Knights' Mirabella Cup run, where the club dispatched the likes of Oakleigh Cannons FC and Green Gully SC on their way to the final, but lost 2–0 at Melbourne's AAMI Park to Northcote City FC. The Knights confirmed back to back Australian-Croatian Soccer Tournament titles in October 2011, as the 37th edition of the event was held at Kralj Tomislav in Sydney.

The club relieved Paul Magdic of his duties as head manager in mid-2012, replacing him with club legends Andrew Marth and Frank Juric, the former taking the head role and the latter the assistant's role. Marth led the club on a mini-revival, taking the Knights away from relegation but not enough to book a finals berth.

The Melbourne Knights officially launched a sports gym on 3 March 2013. The newly constructed gym, located behind the Mark Viduka stand at Knights Stadium, is a fully equipped boxing, weight and cardio facility.

The 2013 season was a welcome change for the Knights, finishing in second place in the regular season, but went down initially to Bentleigh Greens SC in the qualifying final and then to bitter rivals South Melbourne 1–0 in the semi-final. The South Melbourne derby was played in-front of 5,000 supporters at Knights Stadium. The bumper crowd was the result of the match falling in the middle of the Australian-Croatian Soccer Tournament hosted by the Knights. Marijan Cvitkovic took out the VPL's best-and-fairest player for 2013 as Melbourne Knights celebrated their 60th year of existence in style.

== National Premier Leagues Victoria and FFA Cup (2014–present) ==
In 2014, the Knights' squad was decimated by injuries in the first half of the season and struggled for results. A resurgence in the second half of the season saw the club pick up more points than most of the clubs above it to finish in 5th place. The major achievement was winning the 2014 Dockerty Cup, beating South Springvale in the final through a 121st-minute goal from captain Tomislav Uskok. On the way to the final, Melbourne beat rivals South Melbourne in the quarter-finals in a riveting contest. The club also qualified for the inaugural 2014 FFA Cup through their progression in the Dockerty Cup, but were knocked out by Olympic FC in the Round of 32 in a contentious affair.

The 2015 season saw the club qualify for the newly re-introduced league finals series after a strong league showing, finishing in 4th place. The Knights exited the finals series at the first stage, though, going down on penalties to Hume City FC. In the penalty shoot-out, Hume City keeper Chris Oldfield saved all four of Croatia's penalty kicks. At the club's end of season awards night, talismanic striker Stipo Andrijašević took out the 2015 Best & Fairest and 2015 Top Goalscorer awards. Andrijašević's incredible long distance volley into the top corner against Green Gully SC on 18 July was voted as the best goal in the NPL Victoria.

With youth product, captain and fan-favourite Tomislav Uskok signing for A-League side Central Coast Mariners in November, 2015 Knights re-signed the majority of their players from the previous season. Established goalkeeper Chris May and long serving full back Anthony Colosimo departed and in came young talents like 18-year-old Nick Glavan and 17-year-old Nikola Jurković from Melbourne Victory Youth and sister-club North Geelong Warriors respectively. Melbourne Knights finished the NPL Victoria season in ninth place, missing out on a finals spot. However, the Somers Street-based side qualified for the national stage of the 2016 FFA Cup following a 2–0 victory over Port Melbourne SC. Knights drew Western Australian side Cockburn City SC, defeating them 2–1 at Knights Stadium. In the Round of 16, at home once more, Melbourne Knights lost 3–1 to Green Gully in front of 2,472 fans.

After a disappointing first half of the 2017 season, head coach Andrew Marth and assistant Frank Jurić were relieved of their coaching duties with the club languishing in third-bottom place and out of the FFA Cup in the qualifying stages, losing to NPL Victoria 2 side Dandenong City. Former Port Melbourne coach Eric Vassiliadis was announced as the new head coach on 21 May 2017. Vassiliadis lasted just 35 days in the role before he was relieved of his duties, gaining one point in five matches in his time as head coach. Croatia finished in 12th place with 24 points, its lowest points total since returning to Victorian state football in 2005. The 12th-place finish meant Knights had to play in the promotion-relegation playoff match, coming up against fellow Croatian-backed side Dandenong City for the second time that season. A Kym Harris hat-trick secured a 3–2 win for Melbourne Knights on the day and survival in the NPL Victoria.

In the post-season, a change in board saw a change in senior team management, with Knights securing former Croatian international Aljoša Asanović as the head coach, with Dean Računica his assistant. The appointment of Asanović, a World Cup bronze medal winner in 1998, and Računica, was hailed as arguable the biggest coaching coup in the history of the NPL Victoria. Uskok also returned to the club. Knights finished the 2018 National Premier Leagues Victoria season in ninth place, four points adrift of a finals spot. Marijan Cvitkovic, Nate Foster and Uskok all finished the season with eight goals. Croatia won the 2018 Australian-Croatian Soccer Tournament, hosted by Gold Coast Knights, beating North Geelong 3–0 in the final. After the conclusion of the season, Asanović and Računica departed the club to take up an opportunity in Saudi Arabia, joining Slaven Bilić at Al-Ittihad.

The club promoted Micky Colina, the club's u20s coach, to take over the senior head manager role for 2019. On 25 May 2019, the club announced that it had parted ways with Micky Colina as head coach of the first team along with his assistant Steve Gojevic. Marijan Cvitković was appointed as player-coach for the remainder of the 2019 season. Knights qualified for the 2019 FFA Cup, managing impressive wins over league-leaders Avondale FC and old foes South Melbourne in the qualifying stages. Melbourne Knights were drawn against A-League side Adelaide United FC in the Round of 32, ultimately going down 5–2 in the clash played in front of 4,078 fans at Knights Stadium. 4 days later, a second cup run came to an end for the Knights, losing 1–0 to Hume City in the 2019 Dockerty Cup final.
