= Canberra Cosmos FC league record by opponent =

Canberra Cosmos Football Club was an Australian professional association football club based in Canberra. The club was formed in 1995 and joined the National Soccer League in the 1995–96 season.

Canberra Cosmos' first team has competed in the National Soccer League and their record against each club faced in the National Soccer League is listed below. Canberra Cosmos' first National Soccer League match was against Eastern Suburbs and they met their 18th and last different opponent, Newcastle United (now Newcastle Jets), for the first time in the 2000–01 National Soccer League season. The teams that Canberra Cosmos played the most in league competition was Sydney Olympic and Sydney City, who they first met in the 1995–96 National Soccer League season; the 11 defeats from 15 meetings was more than they have lost against any other club. Eastern Pride drew 6 league encounters with Canberra Cosmos, more than any other club. Canberra Cosmos had recorded more league victories against Wollongong Wolves than against any other club, having beaten them 5 times out of 13 attempts.

== Key ==
- The table includes results of matches played by Canberra Cosmos in the National Soccer League.
- The name used for each opponent is the name they had when Canberra Cosmos most recently played a league match against them.
- The columns headed "First" and "Last" contain the first and last seasons in which Canberra Cosmos played league matches against each opponent.
- P = matches played; W = matches won; D = matches drawn; L = matches lost; Win% = percentage of total matches won
- ‡ Clubs with this background and symbol in the "Opponent" column were defunct during the club's period.

== All-time league record ==
Canberra Cosmos FC league record by opponent
Club	P	W	D	L	P	W	D	L	P	W	D	L	Win%	First	Last	Notes
Club	Home				Away				Total				Win%	First	Last	Notes
Adelaide Force	6	1	2	3	7	0	0	7	13	1	2	10	7.69	1995–96	2000–01	(Note: Record against Adelaide City included)
Adelaide Sharks	5	1	1	3	4	0	1	3	9	1	2	6	11.11	1995–96	1998–99	(Note: Record against West Adelaide included)
Brisbane Strikers	6	1	1	4	7	0	3	4	13	1	4	8	7.69	1995–96	2000–01	
Carlton ‡	5	2	0	3	5	1	0	4	10	3	0	7	30.00	1997–98	2000–01	
Collingwood Warriors	1	0	1	0	1	0	0	1	2	0	1	1	0.00	1996–97	1996–97	
Eastern Pride	7	3	2	2	6	1	4	1	13	4	6	3	30.77	1995–96	2000–01	(Note: Record against Morwell Falcons and Gippsland Falcons included)
Football Kingz	2	1	0	1	2	1	0	1	4	2	0	2	50.00	1999–2000	2000–01	
Marconi Fairfield	6	0	1	5	7	1	1	5	13	1	2	10	7.69	1995–96	2000–01	
Melbourne Knights	5	1	3	1	8	1	2	5	13	2	5	6	15.38	1995–96	2000–01	
Newcastle Breakers ‡	6	3	2	1	5	0	2	3	11	3	4	4	27.27	1995–96	1999–2000	
Newcastle United	1	1	0	0	1	0	0	1	2	1	0	1	50.00	2000–01	2000–01	
Northern Spirit	3	1	0	2	3	3	0	0	6	4	0	2	66.67	1998–99	2000–01	
Parramatta Power	2	1	0	1	2	2	0	0	4	3	0	1	75.00	1999–2000	2000–01	
Perth Glory	4	1	1	2	6	0	1	5	10	1	2	7	10.00	1996–97	2000–01	
South Melbourne	6	3	1	2	7	0	3	4	13	3	4	6	23.08	1995–96	2000–01	
Sydney Olympic	8	1	1	6	7	0	2	5	15	1	3	11	6.67	1995–96	2000–01	
Sydney United	7	1	2	4	6	0	2	4	13	1	4	8	7.69	1995–96	2000–01	
Wollongong Wolves	7	3	1	3	6	2	0	4	13	5	1	7	38.46	1995–96	2000–01	(Note: Record against Wollongong City included)
