= Talajić =

Talajić is a Croatian surname. Notable people with the surname include:

- Dalibor Talajić, Croatian comic book artist
- Dragan Talajić, Croatian football manager and former player
- Mark Talajic, former Australian footballer
