= Kenny Murphy =

Kenny Murphy may refer to:

- Kenny Murphy (soccer) (born 1956), Australian soccer player
- Kenny Murphy (rugby union) (born 1966), former Irish rugby union player
