= 1996 National Soccer League grand final =

1996 National Soccer League Grand Final
- Event: 1995–96 National Soccer League
Melbourne Knights	Marconi-Fairfield
2	1
- Date: 26 May 1996
- Venue: Olympic Park, Melbourne, Victoria, Australia
- Man of the Match: Andrew Marth (Joe Marston Medal)
- Referee: Eddie Lennie
- Attendance: 14,256

The 1996 National Soccer League Grand Final was the first grand final to be held under the A-League name after the short-lived rebranding of the National Soccer League (NSL) began before the 1995–96 season. Melbourne Knights defeated Marconi-Fairfield 2–1 to win their second consecutive grand final.

== Route to the final ==
=== Melbourne Knights ===
Melbourne Knights were the first team into the grand final defeating Marconi-Fairfield 3–2 over two legs in the major semi-final.

=== Marconi-Fairfield ===
After losing the major semi-final to the Knights, Marconi-Fairfield followed up with a 4–1 win over Adelaide City in the preliminary final to book their place in the grand final.

== Pre-match ==
=== Venue selection ===
With Melbourne Knights the first into the final, there was speculation that the Knights would host the match at Somers Street, however Soccer Australia announced on 12 May that the match would be played at Olympic Park.

== Match ==
=== Details ===
26 May 1996 Grand final	Melbourne Knights	2–1	Marconi-Fairfield	Melbourne, Australia
15:00	Andrew Marth 58'; Adrian Cervinski 74'	Report	Andy Harper 78'	Stadium: Olympic Park; Attendance: 14,256; Referee: Eddie Lennie

GK
Substitutes:
Head coach
(Australia) Ian Dobson

(Australia) Vilson Knezevic
(Australia) David Cervinski
(Australia) Zoran Markovski
(Australia) Lubo Lapsansky
(Australia) Ante Kovacevic	(substituted off) 45'
(Croatia) Josip Šimunić
(Australia) Adrian Cervinski
(Australia) Fausto De Amicis
(Australia) Tom Pondeljak	(substituted off) 71'
(Australia) Andrew Marth
(Australia) John Markovski	(substituted off) 85'
(Australia) Vinko Buljubasic	(substituted on) 45'
(Australia) Joe Bacak	(substituted on) 71'
(Australia) Dragi Nastevski	(substituted on) 85'

GK
Substitutes:
Head coach:
(Australia) Manfred Schaefer

(Australia) Bob Catlin
(Australia) Brendan Renaud
(Australia) Eric Hristodoulou
(Australia) Vlado Zoric
(Australia) Paul Souris
(Australia) Matthew Bingley
(Australia) Andy Harper
(Australia) Brad Maloney
(Australia) Robert Stanton
(Australia) Gary van Egmond	(substituted off) 65'
(Australia) Dominic Longo
(Australia) Jon Angelucci	(substituted on) 65'

Assistant referees:
Fourth official:

Match rules

- 90 minutes.
- 30 minutes of extra time if necessary.
- Penalty shoot-out if scores still level.
