= Brimbank Stallions FC =

Australian semi-professional soccer club

Brimbank Stallions F.C.
- Full name: Brimbank Stallions Football Club
- Founded: 1986; 40 years ago as Sunshine Park
- Ground: Club Italia Sporting Club, St Albans
- Chairman: Anthony Chapman
- Manager: Andrew Marth
- League: Victorian State League 1 North–West
- 2024: 5th of 12
- Website: www.brimbankstallionsfc.com.au

Brimbank Stallions Football Club is an Australian semi-professional soccer club from Sunshine. The club competes in the Victorian State League Division 1 West. The club was founded in 1986 by the local Italian community in Sunshine and the surrounding suburbs of Melbourne's west.

== Recent history ==
Brimbank Stallions FC finished second in the 2015 Victorian State League Division 4 season just missing out on promotion. However the club would go on to win three consecutive promotions in 2016, 2017 and 2018, lifting the club from State 4 to State League 1, the latter two after hiring former National Soccer League player Andrew Marth.

The club has ambitions to become a National Premier Leagues Victoria club.
