= 1995–96 National Soccer League =

Australian soccer season

NSL 1995-96
- League: National Soccer League
- Sport: Soccer
- Duration: 1995–96
- Teams: 12

NSL season
- Champions: Melbourne Knights
- Minor premiers: Marconi-Fairfield
- Top scorer: Damian Mori (31)

National Soccer League seasons
- ← 1994–95 1996–97 →

The 1995–96 A-League season was the first year of a rebranded Australian National Soccer League (NSL) and the twentieth since the national league began in 1977. The competition was variously known as the A-League and the Ericsson Cup (as part of a sponsorship arrangement) at the time.

== Background ==
After an attempt to reduce the number of NSL teams from 14 to 12, the Australian Soccer Federation announced that a new competition known as the A-League would operate in parallel to the NSL. After a series of legal challenges, the A-League became the sole national league with largely the same composition of teams as the previous NSL season. The change was seen at the time as a rebranding rather than a new competition. Prior to the season beginning, the league announced a sponsorship agreement with Ericsson that was supposed to last until 2000, though was terminated a year early in mid-1999. The sponsorship led to the league being renamed the Ericsson Cup, though the A-League and NSL names were still used in various forms.

The commencement of the season was delayed as relegated teams Melbourne SC and Heidelberg United obtained court injunctions to prevent the league going ahead. Eventually the injunction was lifted in the Federal Court of Australia to allow the league to start, albeit several weeks late.

== Changes from 1994–95 ==
Parramatta Eagles, Melbourne SC and Heidelberg United were excluded from the national league, while Newcastle Breakers returned after a one-season absence. The Canberra Cosmos entered the league for the first time.

Sydney Olympic signed a deal with the University of Technology Sydney (UTS) to become known as UTS Olympic.

After using penalty shootout to break ties in 1994–95, the draw returned for league play in 1994–95.

== Overview ==
The league was composed of 12 teams. After 33 rounds, Marconi-Fairfield were crowned minor premiers. In the final series, Marconi-Fairfield and the Melbourne Knights contested the 1996 A-League Grand Final, with Melbourne Knights prevailing 2–1.

== Teams ==
Prior to the start of the season, the Newcastle Breakers withdrew from the competition citing financial difficulties. The withdrawal of the Breakers left 13 teams, meaning each team had two byes for the season.

Location of teams in 1995–96 season

Team	Home city	Home ground
Adelaide City	Adelaide	Hindmarsh Stadium
Brisbane Strikers	Brisbane	Suncorp Stadium
Canberra Cosmos	Canberra	Bruce Stadium
Morwell Falcons	Morwell	Falcons Park
Marconi-Fairfield	Sydney	Marconi Stadium
Melbourne Knights	Melbourne	Knights Stadium
Newcastle Breakers	Newcastle	Breakers Stadium
South Melbourne	Melbourne	Olympic Park; Lakeside Stadium
Sydney United	Sydney	Edensor Park
UTS Olympic	Sydney	Leichhardt Oval
West Adelaide	Adelaide	Hindmarsh Stadium
Wollongong City	Wollongong	Brandon Park

== Regular season ==
=== League table ===
Pos	Team	Pld	W	D	L	GF	GA	GD	Pts	Qualification
1	Marconi Fairfield	33	17	9	7	58	35	+23	60	Qualification for the Finals series
2	Melbourne Knights (C)	33	17	8	8	50	28	+22	59	Qualification for the Finals series
3	UTS Olympic	33	17	8	8	55	41	+14	59	Qualification for the Finals series
4	Brisbane Strikers	33	17	6	10	54	35	+19	57	Qualification for the Finals series
5	Adelaide City	33	15	9	9	65	40	+25	54	Qualification for the Finals series
6	Sydney United	33	14	12	7	47	33	+14	54	Qualification for the Finals series
7	West Adelaide	33	16	5	12	49	43	+6	53	
8	South Melbourne	33	14	4	15	50	56	−6	46	
9	Canberra Cosmos	33	8	11	14	48	61	−13	35	
10	Morwell Falcons	33	9	8	16	35	65	−30	35	
11	Wollongong City	33	5	5	23	31	63	−32	20	
12	Newcastle Breakers	33	4	5	24	35	77	−42	17	

Updated to match(es) played on unknown. Source: rsssf.com
Rules for classification: 1) points; 2) goal difference; 3) number of goals scored.
(C) Champions

== Finals series ==
Elimination finals
3	UTS Olympic	0	0	(0)
5	Adelaide City	2	1	(3)
4	Brisbane Strikers	0	1	(1)
6	Sydney United	2	2	(3)

Semifinals
1	Melbourne Knights	1	2	(3)
2	Marconi Fairfield	0	2	(2)
Adelaide City	1
Sydney United	0

Preliminary final
Marconi Fairfield	4
Adelaide City	1

Grand final
Melbourne Knights	2
Marconi Fairfield	1

=== Grand Final ===
26 May 1996
15:00 AEST

Melbourne Knights	2 – 1	Marconi-Fairfield
Marth 58'; Cervinski 74'	(report)	Harper 78'

Olympic Park Stadium, Melbourne
Attendance: 14,258
Referee: Eddie Lennie

== Individual awards ==
- Johnny Warren Medal: Damian Mori (Adelaide City)
- U-21 Player of the Year: Jim Tsekenis (West Adelaide)
- Top Scorer: Damian Mori (Adelaide City) – 31 goals
- Coach of the Year: John Perin (Adelaide City)
