= Andrew Marth =

Australian soccer player and manager

Personal information
- Full name: Andrew Marth
- Date of birth: 10 February 1969 (age 57)
- Position: Midfielder

Senior career*
| Years | Team | Apps | (Gls) |
| 1986–1989 | Sunshine Georgies | 59 | (2) |
| 1989–1998 | Melbourne Knights | 194 | (35) |
| 1997 | → St Albans (loan) | 33 | (14) |
| 1998–2001 | Carlton SC | 66 | (18) |
| 2001–2004 | Melbourne Knights | 75 | (13) |
| 2004 | Fawkner Blues | 9 | (1) |
| 2005–2006 | Green Gully | 21 | (1) |

International career
| 1991–2000 | Australia | 16 | (1) |

Managerial career
- 1997: St Albans
- 1998: Green Gully
- 2000–2003: Melbourne Knights
- 2006: Green Gully
- 2012–2017: Melbourne Knights
- 2017–: Brimbank Stallions FC
Medal record
Representing Australia
Men's Association football
OFC Nations Cup
| Winner | 1996 Oceania |
- * Club domestic league appearances and goals

Andrew Marth (born 10 February 1969) is a retired Australian soccer player who played 380 times in the National Soccer League (NSL) over 15 years for Sunshine George Cross, Melbourne Knights and Carlton SC. He also represented Australia 16 times. He is the current manager of Victorian State League Division 1 club Brimbank Stallions FC, with whom he achieved back-to-back promotions in 2017 and 2018.

== Early life ==
Marth was born in 1969. His father, Franz, was a soccer player who had represented Allemannia, George Cross, Wilhelmina and USC Lions in Melbourne, and Hollandia in Brisbane.

== Playing career ==
=== Club career ===
Marth broke into the senior setup at National Soccer League club Sunshine George Cross FC. He spent four seasons with the Western-suburbs based club before moving to nearby fellow NSL club Melbourne Croatia in 1989. In the 1990–91 season, he won the Minor Premiership with Croatia but lost the Grand Final by penalty shootout to bitter rivals South Melbourne FC. Marth scored the only goal for Knights, at the 26th minute, but the final score was 1-1. With Melbourne Croatia, Marth would then collect two more minor premierships but lose two more grand finals, both to Adelaide City.

In the 1994–95 season, Knights once more met Adelaide City in the Grand Final but this time would emerge victorious, with the by-then captain of the Knights Andrew Marth grabbing a goal in a 2–0 victory. Marth then repeated his feat from the 94–95 season in the 95–96 season when he would once again captain Knights to an NSL title, this time beating Marconi Fairfield 2–1, Marth once more on the scoresheet. Marth was the Joe Marston medallist in the 1996 national league grand final.

Marth left the Knights at the end of the 1997–98 season, taking up a lucrative offer from Carlton SC, expressing vexation with the club's recruitment policy. After spending three season with Carlton, Marth then returned to the Knights. Carlton folded that year.

After Vlado Vaniš was sacked as the coach in 2001, Marth took over as player-coach to see out the season. He was sacked as coach in January 2003 but continued as a player.

Marth played his final game for Melbourne Knights at the end of the 2003–04 NSL season, taking on sister-club Sydney United at Knights Stadium. At the end of the match, Marth and Mark Rudan, the two captains of their sides, were carried off the pitch side by side.

The hard-man midfielder then went and spent a season with Fawkner Blues in the VPL and then closed out his career with two seasons in the VPL with Green Gully.

=== International career ===
Marth played 16 matches for Australia between 1991 and 2000. Marth made his debut for the national team against New Zealand in Christchurch in May 1991.

International goals
| No. | Date | Venue | Opponent | Score | Result | Competition |
|---|---|---|---|---|---|---|
| 1 | 5 July 1992 | Olympic Park Stadium (Melbourne), Melbourne, Australia | Croatia | 1-0 | 1-0 | Friendly |

== Coaching career ==
When Paul Magdić was sacked as coach of Melbourne Knights FC in mid-2012, the club decided to hire Marth, with fellow club legend Frank Juric appointed as his assistant. Melbourne Knights, now playing in the VPL, went through a mini-revival after the appointment, escaping relegation by some distance but missing out on making the finals' series. In his first full season, Marth managed to take the Knights to the final series following a second place league finish. Unfortunately, Melbourne Knights lost to both Bentleigh Greens and South Melbourne and exited the finals series.

After the 2013 season, Marth was inducted into the Melbourne Knights Hall of Fame.

In 2014, Marth won the Dockerty Cup with the Knights, beating South Springvale in the final. Reaching the semi-final of the Dockerty Cup also took Knights to the inaugural FFA Cup, where they lost to Olympic FC in Queensland.

In 2016 Marth became Melbourne Knights' longest-serving head coach. In May 2017 Marth was relieved of his duties as coach of the NPL Victoria club.

After departing the Knights, Marth dropped four division to join Victorian State League Division 3 club Brimbank Stallions FC, with whom he managed back-to-back promotions in 2017 and 2018.

== Honours ==
=== Player ===
Melbourne Knights

- National Soccer League Minor Premiers: 1990–91, 1991–92, 1993–94, 1994–95
- National Soccer League Champions: 1994–95, 1995–96

Australia

- OFC Nations Cup: 1996

Personal

- Joe Marston Medal: 1995–96

=== Coach ===
Melbourne Knight

- Dockerty Cup: 2014

Brimbank Stallions

- Victorian State League 3 North-West Premiers: 2017
