= Billy Vojtek =

Australian soccer player

Personal information
- Full name: William Vojtek
- Date of birth: 29 September 1943 (age 83)
- Place of birth: Independent State of Croatia
- Position: Striker

Youth career
- Essendon

Senior career*
Years	Team	Apps	(Gls)
1962–1972	Melbourne Croatia		
1973–1974	Sydney Croatia		
1974–1976	Brunswick Juventus		
1977–1978	Essendon Croatia		
1979–1980	Green Gully		
1981–1982	Western Suburbs		
1983–1984	St Albans Saints		
1984–1986	Essendon Royals		

International career^{‡}
1967–1973	Australia	44	(13)
- * Club domestic league appearances and goals as of 16 Aug 07 ‡ National team caps and goals as of 16 Aug 07

William Vojtek (born 29 September 1943) is a retired soccer player. He migrated from Croatia to Australia with his family as a child in 1956 and started playing for Essendon Juniors before representing Victoria from the under 13s to under 18s. Vojtek played the majority of his career with Croatia (Melbourne) and is now the coach of the Melbourne Knights U/16 squad located in Sunshine Melbourne. In 2010 Vojtek was presented with recognition of 50 years of service to the Melbourne Knights. Vojtek was selected in the Melbourne Knights Team of the Century as the number 9, the team's other striker was Mark Viduka.

== Playing career ==
In 1962 he changed clubs to Croatia (Melbourne) who were playing in Division One North at that time, and he was the club's top scorer and won the best and fairest award. In 1966 he represented Victoria, and played a total of 34 games and scored 12 goals for them. In 1972 Croatia (Melbourne) was expelled from the Victoria State Federation, and Vojtek moved to Sydney Croatia for the 1973 season before returning to Melbourne with (Brunswick) Juventus in June 1974. In 1975, he won the Bill Fleming Medal. In 1977, he moved to the Essendon Lions, who became known as Essendon Croatia shortly after he joined. He again changed teams to Green Gully in 1979. His career was interrupted by an Achilles tendon injury and he had spells at Western Suburbs, St Albans Dinamo and Essendon Triestina to finish his playing career. In 1983 Vojtek and Branko Culina led St Albans to their first title, the Victorian State League Division 2. Vojtek was the league's top scorer that season with 16 goals.

=== International career ===
Vojtek first represented Australia in 1967 as part of the squad that undertook an Asian tour. Between 1967 and 1971 Vojtek only missed one game for the national team. He was the only Croatian in the Australian team at the time.

He also represented Australia on 44 occasions. He was included in the preliminary 40 man squad for the 1974 World Cup but was omitted from the final 22 man squad with suggestions it was because of differences with the coach Rale Rasic. Vojtek said that "Rasic told me I would definitely be in the World Cup squad. I had nightmares for days, you dream about it all your life. I was so close, yet so far away".

He is only recognised as playing 29 FIFA matches for Australia and scoring 6 goals.
