= Jimmy Mackay =

Australian soccer player

Personal information
- Full name: James Birrell Mackay
- Date of birth: 19 December 1943
- Place of birth: Edinburgh, Scotland
- Date of death: 11 December 1998 (aged 54)
- Position: Midfielder

Senior career*
Years	Team	Apps	(Gls)
- Bonnyrigg Rose Athletic
1964–1965	Airdrie	5	(1)
1965–1972	Melbourne Croatia		
1973–1974	Hakoah Eastern Suburbs	22	(0)
1975–1976	South Melbourne Hellas		
1977	South Melbourne	1	(0)
1979	Shepparton United		
1981	Morwell Falcons	6	(1)

International career^{‡}
1970–1975	Australia	52	(5)
- * Club domestic league appearances and goals as of 10 July 2007 ‡ National team caps and goals as of 10 July 2007

James Birrell Mackay (19 December 1943 – 11 December 1998) was an Australian soccer player.

He was a member of the Australian 1974 World Cup squad in West Germany.

In late 1973, he scored the decisive goal against South Korea which sent Australia to its first-ever World Cup. Socceroos defender Doug Utjesenovic described the goal emphatically, "that was one of the freakiest goals. You could try a million times to score the exact goal (and never do it). There was a free kick, the ball was knocked back and he ran onto the ball. It was a real thunderbolt."

Mackay died of a heart attack in 1998.

== Honours ==
Melbourne Croatia

- Victorian Premier League: 1968
- Victorian Ampol Cup: 1968, 1971, 1972

South Melbourne Hellas

- Victorian Premier League: 1976

Individual

- FFA Hall of Fame: 1999
- FFA Team of the Decade: 1971–1980
- FFA Team of the Century (Honourable mention)
