= David Miller (Australian footballer) =

Australian rules footballer

Personal information
- Full name: David Miller
- Born: 7 October 1957 (age 69)
- Original team: Ormond Amateurs
- Height: 188 cm (6 ft 2 in)
- Weight: 86 kg (190 lb)

Playing career^{1}
Years	Club	Games (Goals)
1977	Richmond	5 (7)
- ^{1} Playing statistics correct to the end of 1977.

David Miller (born 7 October 1957) is a former Australian rules footballer who played with Richmond in the Victorian Football League (VFL).
