= Bill McIntyre (footballer) =

Australian rules footballer

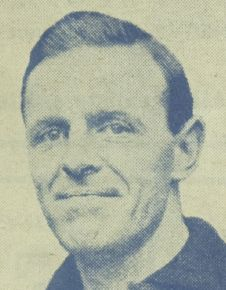

Personal information
- Full name: William Gibson McIntyre
- Born: 29 July 1897; Malvern, Victoria
- Died: 3 March 1971 (aged 73); Prahran, Victoria
- Height: 180 cm (5 ft 11 in)
- Weight: 79 kg (174 lb)

Playing career^{1}
Years	Club	Games (Goals)
1920	Melbourne	3 (0)
1925	Footscray	13 (0)
Total		16 (0)
- ^{1} Playing statistics correct to the end of 1925.

William Gibson McIntyre (29 July 1897 – 3 March 1971) was an Australian rules footballer who played with Melbourne and Footscray in the Victorian Football League (VFL).
