= Daniel Visevic =

Australian soccer player (born 1988)

Personal information
- Date of birth: 30 November 1988 (age 37)
- Place of birth: Melbourne, Australia
- Height: 1.80 m (5 ft 11 in)
- Position: Midfielder

Youth career
- St Albans Saints
- Essendon Royals
- Victorian Institute of Sport

Senior career*
Years	Team	Apps	(Gls)
2005	Melbourne Victory	0	(0)
2006–2007	Richmond	30	(10)
2007	Melbourne Knights	16	(4)
2007–2009	Dinamo Zagreb	0	(0)
2008	→ Lokomotiva Zagreb (loan)		
2009–2010	Richmond	29	(10)
2011	St Albans Saints	23	(6)
2012	Richmond	21	(5)
2013	Port Melbourne Sharks	21	(2)
2014	Melbourne Knights	24	(6)
2015	Bentleigh Greens	27	(2)
2016	Hume City	4	(0)
2016	Altona Magic		(1)
2017	Preston Lions		(1)
2018	Dandenong City	18	(2)
2019	Melbourne Knights	3	(0)

International career
2004–2005	Australia U17		
- * Club domestic league appearances and goals

Daniel Visevic (born 30 November 1988) is an Australian footballer who plays as a midfielder.

Visevic was born in Melbourne and played youth football for St Albans Saints, Essendon Royals and the Victorian Institute of Sport before starting his professional career for Melbourne Victory. After just one competitive appearance for the Victory, Visevic moved back to the Victorian Premier League, where he played until a move to Croatia to play with Dinamo Zagreb in 2007. After spending time on loan with Lokomotiva Zagreb in 2008, Visevic returned to Victoria, where he subsequently played for a number of clubs at state level.

Visevic represented Australia at under-17 level.

== Early life ==
Visevic was born in Melbourne. His parents both moved to Australia from Croatia as children, graduating from the Victorian Institute of Sport.

== Club career ==
Visevic signed a four-week contract with Melbourne Victory in May 2005, and made his professional debut in a loss to Adelaide United in the 2005 Australian Club World Championship Qualifying Tournament in what was the Victory's first ever competitive match. Visevic returned to the Victory in late 2006 on trial.

In early 2007, Visevic joined German side Werder Bremen on trial, playing for Werder Bremen II as a guest player in a friendly win over TSV Havelse.

In November 2007, Visevic began training with Croatian side Dinamo Zagreb. He went on to sign with the club alongside Australian compatriot Mate Dugandzic.

In 2014, Visevic returned to Melbourne Knights, having previously played for the club in 2007.

Visevic signed with Bentleigh Greens in November 2014 ahead of the 2015 National Premier Leagues season. He left the club in October 2015 after winning the 2015 National Premier Leagues Victoria Championship, having made 27 appearances and scored twice for the side.

In November 2015, it was announced that Hume City had signed Visevic on a two-year contract. However, left Hume in May 2017 to sign with Altona Magic, having made only four appearances for Hume due to a shoulder injury. The move marked the first time Visevic had played below top-tier level in Victoria.

Visevic's time at Altona was plagued by continuing shoulder issues, including a shoulder reconstruction, before he signed with Preston Lions in April 2017.

In 2018 he played with the Dandenong City SC in the National Premier Leagues Victoria 2 league; Dandenong won the league, earning promotion to the National Premier Leagues Victoria.

== International career ==
Visevic played several games for the Australian under-17 team. He scored in a win over a youth team of Palestino on a South American tour. He also scored in a loss to the United States U-17 team.

Visevic represented Australia in their victorious 2005 OFC U-17 Championship campaign, including scoring five goals in a 26–0 win over Tonga.

The Croatian Football Federation approached Visevic and fellow Croatian Australians Steven Lustica and Mate Dugandzic to represent Croatia internationally following Visevic's arrival in Zagreb in 2007. Croatian Football Federation President Vlatko Marković confirmed that contact had been made with the players, saying that their families wanted them to play for Croatia and that they were cooperating with the Federation.

== Honours ==
=== Club ===
Melbourne Knights

- Dockerty Cup: 2014

Bentleigh Greens

- National Premier Leagues Victoria: 2015

Dandenong City

- National Premier Leagues Victoria 2: 2018

=== International ===
Australia U17

- OFC U-17 Championship: 2005

=== Individual ===
- Victorian Premier League Under-21 Player of the Year: 2006
