= Mirko Bazić =

Croatian footballer (1938–2021)

Personal information
- Date of birth: 2 November 1938
- Place of birth: Malo Trojstvo, Kingdom of Yugoslavia
- Date of death: 10 March 2021 (aged 82)
- Position: Midfielder

Senior career*
Years	Team	Apps	(Gls)
1958–1962	Metalac Zagreb		
1962–1967	Nehaj		
1967–1970	Kozara Gradiška		

Managerial career
- 1974–1977: Dinamo Zagreb
- 1978–1980: Borac Banja Luka
- 1982–1983: Zagreb
- 1984–1986: Bjelovar
- 1987–1988: Windsor Wheels
- 1989: North York Rockets
- 1993–1996: Melbourne Croatia
- 2003: Melbourne Croatia
- * Club domestic league appearances and goals

Mirko Bazić (2 November 1938 – 10 March 2021) was a Croatian footballer and later football manager.

== Career ==
Bazić played in the Yugoslav Second League in 1958 with NK Metalac Zagreb. In 1962, he played with NK Nehaj, and later with FK Kozara Gradiška.

== Managerial career ==
In 1974, he was named the head coach for GNK Dinamo Zagreb in the Yugoslav First League. In 1976, he led Zagreb to the 1975–76 Yugoslav Cup final, but lost to Hajduk Split. In 1982, he managed NK Zagreb in the Yugoslav Second League, and later with NK Bjelovar. In 1987, he went abroad to coach in Canada's National Soccer League with Windsor Wheels. In his debut season with Windsor he assisted in securing the regular season title. He also led the team in winning the NSL Canadian Championship. He re-signed with Windsor for the 1988 season.

In 1989, he was named the head coach for North York Rockets in the Canadian Soccer League. He was dismissed on 21 August 1989. In 1993, he was appointed the head coach for Melbourne Croatia in the National Soccer League. In his debut season with Melbourne he was named the league's coach of the year. Throughout his tenure with Melbourne he led the club in securing the 1994–95 national championship. In 2002, he returned to manage Melbourne Croatia.
