= Steve Kokoska =

Australian soccer player

Personal information
- Place of birth: Cunnamulla, Queensland
- Position: Defender

Senior career*
Years	Team	Apps	(Gls)
1970–1976	Sunshine City		
1977–1982	Essendon Croatia	118	(3)

International career
1978	Australia	1	(0)
- * Club domestic league appearances and goals

Steve Kokoska is an Australian former soccer player who played as a defender.

== Career ==
Kokoska played for Sunshine City and Essendon Croatia in the Victoria State League.

Kokoska made his only appearance for Australia as a late substitute in a match against Greece in 1978.
