= Mark Talajic =

Australian soccer player

Personal information
- Date of birth: 2 July 1969 (age 57)
- Position: Midfielder

Senior career*
Years	Team	Apps	(Gls)
1986–1991	Melbourne Croatia	87	(4)
1991–1992	Canberra Metros		
1992–1994	Melbourne Knights	48	(0)

International career
1992	Australia	1	(0)
- * Club domestic league appearances and goals

Mark Talajic (born 2 July 1969) is an Australian former soccer player.

== Club career ==
In 2003 as a part of the club's 50th Anniversary celebrations, Talajic was named in the club's Team of the Century nominees.

== International career ==
Talajic represented Australia at both junior and senior level.

He also participated in the qualifiers for the 1987 FIFA World Youth Championship although failed to make the final team.

Talajic only made one appearance for Australia in 1992 against Indonesia as a part of the Indonesian Independence Cup.
