= Peter Davies (footballer, born 1942) =

Welsh footballer

Personal information
- Full name: Peter Davies
- Date of birth: 1 July 1942 (age 84)
- Place of birth: Merthyr Tydfil, Wales
- Position: Inside forward

Senior career*
Years	Team	Apps	(Gls)
–1964	Merthyr Tydfil		
1964	Newport County	1	(0)
1966	Merthyr Tydfil		

International career
1964–1966	Wales Amateurs	2	(0)
- * Club domestic league appearances and goals

Peter Davies (born 1 July 1942) is a Welsh retired amateur footballer who made one appearance in the Football League for Newport County as an inside forward. He was capped by Wales at amateur level.
