= Josip Biskic =

Australian soccer player (born 1959)

Personal information
- Date of birth: 20 May 1959 (age 67)
- Place of birth: SR Croatia, SFR Yugoslavia
- Position: Midfielder

Youth career
- 1972–1974: NK Babina Greda

Senior career*
| Years | Team | Apps | (Gls) |
| 1974–1978 | NK Osijek | | |
| 1978–1980 | NK Slavonski Brod | | |
| 1980–1982 | NK Borovo | | |
| 1982–1995 | Melbourne Knights | 277 | (29) |
| 1995–1996 | Selangor FA | | |
| 1997 | Heidelberg United | 20 | (3) |
| 1998–2001 | Fawkner Blues | 65 | (4) |

Managerial career
- 1998–1999: Melbourne Knights (Asst.)
- 2000: Melbourne Knights
- 2002–2003: Fawkner Blues
- 2006–2007: Melbourne Knights
- 2009–2010: Doncaster Rovers SC
- 2012–2014: Preston Lions FC
- * Club domestic league appearances and goals

Josip Biskic (born 20 May 1959) is a retired Australian Association football player who played for National Soccer League club Melbourne Knights, Malaysian club Selangor FA, and Victorian Premier League clubs Heidelberg United and the Fawkner Blues. After his retirement from playing he moved into coaching.

Biskic is most known for his time at the Melbourne Knights, playing 282 NSL games for the club. He was one of the league's standout players, winning the NSL's player of the year in 1991/92 winning the Johnny Warren Medal, as well as winning the Joe Marston Medal with his man of the match performance in the 1990/91 NSL Grand Final.

He was named as Vice Captain in the Melbourne Knights' Team of the Half Century
