= Duncan MacKay (footballer) =

Scottish footballer and manager (1937–2019)

Personal information
- Date of birth: 14 July 1937
- Place of birth: Glasgow, Scotland
- Date of death: 23 December 2019 (aged 82)
- Position: Right back

Senior career*
Years	Team	Apps	(Gls)
1955–1964	Celtic	162	(5)
1964–1965	Third Lanark	20	(0)
1965–1972	Melbourne Croatia		
1974–1977	Perth Azzurri		

International career
1958–1960	Scotland U23	4	(1)
1959	SFL trial v SFA	1	(0)
1959–1962	Scotland	14	(0)
1961	SFA trial v SFL	2	(0)
- * Club domestic league appearances and goals

Duncan MacKay (14 July 1937 – 23 December 2019) was a Scottish footballer who played for Celtic, Third Lanark, Melbourne Croatia, Perth Azzurri and the Scotland national team.

Born in Glasgow, Mackay turned professional when he joined Celtic from Maryhill Harp, aged 17, in 1955. He developed rapidly, making his club debut within two years and earning the first of an eventual 14 caps for the Scotland national side four years later.

Celtic manager Jimmy McGrory's attempts to rejuvenate his side eventually resulted in MacKay's departure from Celtic Park after over 200 first team appearances, the fullback moving to south Glasgow side Third Lanark in November 1964. Thirds were relegated at the end of the 1964–65 season and MacKay was one of several players released.

MacKay opted to move to Australia at this juncture, joining Melbourne Croatia of the Victorian State League. He helped the side to the State title in 1968 and several Dockerty Cup triumphs but left when Croatia were suspended following crowd disturbances in 1972. He returned to Scotland and joined junior club St Anthony's as a player-coach for two years before deciding upon a second stint in Australia. After playing for Perth Azzurri between 1974 and 1977 he coached with South Melbourne and Croatia (now known as Essendon Lions), the latter as Captain-Coach.

MacKay died on 23 December 2019, aged 82.

== Honours ==
Celtic

- Scottish Cup: Runners-up 1960–61, 1962–63
- Glasgow Charity Cup: 1958–59

Melbourne Knights

- Victorian State League: 1968
- State League Cup: 1971
- Dockerty Cup: 1968, 1969
- Ampol Cup: 1968, 1971, 1972

Perth Azzuri

- NPL WA Premiers: 1975, 1976
- Night Series: 1975
- Top Four Cup: 1976

Individual

- Celtic FC Player of the Year: 1963
- Melbourne Knights Player of the Year: 1968
