= Kenny Murphy (soccer) =

Scottish footballer (born 1956)

Personal information
- Date of birth: 19 June 1956 (age 70)
- Place of birth: Dundee, Scotland
- Position: Midfielder

Youth career
- St Columba's Boys Club; Dundee Boys

Senior career*
Years	Team	Apps	(Gls)
1973–1976	Dundee United	1	(0)
1976–1977	Forfar Athletic	0	(0)
- Melbourne Knights
1983–1987	South Melbourne	96	(8)
1989	Footscray JUST	22	(1)

International career
1983–1987	Australia	15	(1)

Managerial career
- 1991: Thomastown Devils
- 1991–1992: Melbourne Knights
- 1994-1995: Melbourne Zebras
- 1996: Thomastown Devils
- 1997: Port Melbourne Sharks
- 1997-2001: Manningham United
- 2003: Bulleen Lions
- 2005–2006: Altona Magic
- 2006: Kingston City
- 2008: Western Suburbs SC
- 2010: Manningham United
- * Club domestic league appearances and goals

Kenneth Murphy (born 19 June 1956) is a Scottish former footballer who played international football for Australia.

== Career ==
Murphy signed for Dundee United as a youngster and made one official appearance for the first team. Murphy moved on to Forfar Athletic before transferring to Melbourne CroatiaAustralia. Here, he also played for South Melbourne Hellas and Footscray JUST, also qualifying for the national team. Another Dundonian, Allan Boath, played for New Zealand under similar circumstances

Murphy managed former club National League club Melbourne Knights FC, then known as Melbourne Croatia, from 1991 to 1992, where he won the NSL Premiership but lost the Grand Final to Adelaide City on penalty shoot-out..He left Melbourne Knights mid-way through the 1992-93 season. He joined Melbourne Zebras 1994 to 1995 and was assistant coach in 2005 at another former club, South Melbourne. He managed Altona Magic although he left after just over a year. In July 2006, two weeks after leaving Altona, he took over at Kingston City.In 2008, he coached Western Suburbs SC, and then returned to Manningham United, then known as Fawkner Blues in 2010.

== Honours ==
=== Player ===
Melbourne Knights

- NPL Victoria: 1978, 1979
- State League Cup: 1979, 1980
- Dockerty Cup: 1979
- Ampol Cup: 1978, 1980

South Melbourne

- National Soccer League: 1984

Australia national team

- Ampol Cup: 1985
- Merlion Cup: 1983

=== Manager ===
Melbourne Knights

- NSL Minor Premiers: 1991–92
