= Toto da Costa =

Angolan footballer

Personal information
- Full name: Antonio Santos Maria da Costa
- Date of birth: 9 August 1973 (age 53)
- Place of birth: Luanda, Angola
- Position: Forward

Senior career*
Years	Team	Apps	(Gls)
1992–1993	Estoril	6	(0)
1995–1997	RBC Roosendaal	16	(2)
1997–1999	SBV Eindhoven	53	(9)
2000–2002	Melbourne Knights FC	42	(22)
Total		117+	(33+)
- * Club domestic league appearances and goals

Antonio "Toto" Santos Maria da Costa (born 9 August 1973) is an Angolan former professional footballer who played as a forward.

== Career ==
Born in Luanda, Da Costa played with RBC Roosendaal of the Dutch Eerste Divisie for the 1995–96 and 1996–97 seasons, Da Costa provided a hat-trick on his debut in December 1995.

He signed a two-season deal with Melbourne Knights of the National Soccer League in winter 2000. He found it hard at first to get used to the physical oriented game in Australia compared to the tactical style he was accustomed to in Europe. Considering this, the Luanda native stated that the National Soccer League was underrated in its quality but left the Knights in summer 2002 to seek opportunities in the Netherlands.

Despite being pensive over the fact that his family was not in Australia with him, he claimed that he liked life in the country.
