= Tommy Cumming =

Australian soccer player and coach

Personal information
- Full name: Tommy Cumming
- Date of birth: 19 June 1956 (age 70)
- Place of birth: Scotland
- Position: Striker

Senior career*
Years	Team	Apps	(Gls)
1976–1977	Sunshine City		
1978–1980	Essendon Croatia		
1983–1985	Melbourne Croatia	68	(22)
1985–1986	Green Gully	27	(3)

International career
1979–1980	Australia	4	(1)
- * Club domestic league appearances and goals as of July 19, 2017

Tommy Cumming (born 19 June 1956 in Scotland) is an Australian former association football player and coach.

== Playing career ==
=== Club career ===
Cumming played for Sunshine City and Essendon Croatia in the Victorian State League before playing for Melbourne Croatia in the National Soccer League.

=== International career ===
Cumming played four times for Australia in 1980, scoring one goal.

== Coaching career ==
In 1984 and 1985 Cumming, while still playing, coached Melbourne Croatia in the National Soccer League.

In 1988-89, Cumming joined Bell Park Soccer Club leading the team to consecutive promotions, taking on a player/coach role in 1991.

== Honours ==
Sunshine City

- Victoria Division One: 1977

Essendon / Melbourne Croatia

- Victoria Division One: 1978, 1979
- State League Cup: 1979, 1980, 1983
- Dockerty Cup: 1979, 1983
- Victoria Ampol Cup: 1980
