= Melbourne Knights FC =

Australian semi-professional Football club

Melbourne Knights
- Full name: Melbourne Knights Football Club
- Nicknames: Knights, Croatia, Croacija
- Founded: 1953; 73 years ago as Croatia; 1976 as Essendon Croatia; 1982 as Melbourne Croatia
- Ground: Knights Stadium
- Capacity: 15,000
- President: Tony Topcic
- Manager: Michael Calandrella
- League: Victoria Premier League 1
- 2026: 1st of 14 (promoted & premiers) NPL Victoria 2027
- Website: www.melbourneknights.com.au
Home colours	Away colours

Melbourne Knights Football Club is an Australian professional soccer club based in the suburb of Sunshine North, Melbourne. The club currently competes in the Victorian Premier League 1, the second-tier of the Victorian soccer league system. It is one of the most successful soccer clubs in Australia, being a two-time championship and four-time premiership winner in the now defunct National Soccer League (NSL).

The club is based in the western suburbs of Melbourne and draws much of its support from the Croatian Australian community. The club's identification with its Croatian roots remains strong. It is a regular participant in the Australian-Croatian Soccer Tournament.

The Melbourne Knights play matches at Knights Stadium, a 15,000 capacity venue (with approximately 4,000 seated) which the club has owned and operated since 1989. As well as fielding men's and women's sides, the Knight's field junior teams of all year levels.

== History ==
Melbourne Knights FC was founded as Croatia in 1953 by a small group of Croatian immigrants in Melbourne's western suburbs. The club played its first match on 10 April 1953. The Knights became a member of the Victorian Soccer Federation in 1954, which saw the club join and compete in a league competition for the first time that same year in the newly created Victorian Provisional League. The club quickly moved up the state divisions and, by the mid-1960s, had become one of the strongest clubs in Victoria, winning the State League title in 1968, 1978 and 1979.

In 1984, after a number of years of lobbying, the Knights finally joined Australia's elite soccer competition, the National Soccer League. By the 1990s, the club had become the premier soccer club in Australia as it made the NSL Grand Final in 5 out of 6 seasons, winning it twice, in 1994–95 and 1995–96. Following the disbanding of the NSL in 2004, the Knights dropped to the Victorian Premier League, making the Grand Final in 2008. The Knights won the Dockerty Cup in 2014, the club's first piece of major silverware in 18 years.

== Supporters ==
The Melbourne Knights have a large following among Australia's Croatian community, particularly from Melbourne's western suburbs. This supporter base is made up of both Croatian and Croatian-descent Australians.

The unofficial supporter group of the Melbourne Knights is the MCF (Melbourne Croatia Fans). In the NSL years, the supporter group was the Knights Army, they were one of the leading supporter groups in the competition. They disbanded once the Melbourne Knights left the NSL.

== Home ground ==
The club's current home ground is the Knights Stadium in the suburb of North Sunshine, which has been the club's home since 1989. It has a capacity of 15,000. More information on the Knights Stadium page.

Prior to 1989, the club had a number of venues it used as its home ground. The most significant ones were:

- Royal Park, Royal Park, Melbourne: 1954: 1957
- Separation St Geelong: 1958
- Corio Oval, Geelong: 1959: 1961
- Tracey's Speedway, Maribyrnong: 1962: 1967
- Montgomery Park, Essendon: 1975 -1976
- Olympic Park: permanent home from 1968 to 1972 and 1977–1988

== Senior Men's squad ==
As of 1 July 2026

Note: Flags indicate national team as defined under FIFA eligibility rules; some limited exceptions apply. Players may hold more than one non-FIFA nationality.

No.	Pos.	Nation	Player
1	GK	AUS	Gabriel Matti
3	DF	AUS	Theodore Aresti
4	MF	IRL	Maurice Nugent
5	MF	AUS	Tomas Karlovic
6	MF	AUS	Anthony Duzel
9	FW	AUS	Joshua Divin
10	MF	AUS	Luka Kolić
11	FW	AUS	Fraser Dunlop
12	DF	AUS	Mark Ochieng
13	DF	IRQ	Aisen Ishak

No.	Pos.	Nation	Player
20	MF	SOM	Ismail Liban
22	MF	JPN	Masatou Chiba
27	DF	MKD	Filip Jovcevski
33	GK	AUS	Lucas Trenkovski
—	DF	AUS	Adrian Valenti
—	DF	AUS	Nathan Hancock
—	MF	IRL	Stephen Lawless
—	MF	AUS	Josh Karantz

== Youth and Junior development ==
The Melbourne Knights is a club known for its youth and junior development, it has one of the most popular set ups in Australia. Many notable players have gone through the youth set up at the Knights, including Socceroo captain Mark Viduka. A highlight of this strong setup came in the NSL years where the Melbourne Knights were a dominant force in the National Youth League, being champions 3 times. The club was also runner-up on two other occasions. The Knights have continued this winning tradition at the youth level in the VPL, with the club winning the double as it took out the Under 18 and Under 20 Victorian championships in 2007

Currently the club is home to over 250 players ranging in sides from the Under 8 to Under 18 level in the Victorian Milo leagues, as well as an Under 20 youth team which serves as the reserves side and plays in the Victorian Premier League Reserves competition.

The club has played a particular role within the youth of the Croatian community in both Melbourne and Geelong, giving them a chance to succeed in the sport. The result of this can be seen in the many soccer players of Croatian heritage that have played for the Knights at the senior level over the past six decades.

The success of the club's youth development can be seen in the number of Knights players that have gone onto play in some of the best soccer leagues around the world and play international soccer; 38 Knights players have played for Australia at senior level and 3 for Croatia. As well as countless others who played for Australia at Under 17, Under 20 and Under 23 levels. An example of the impact the club has had at this level was the 1996 Atlanta Olympic side (under 23) which contained a staggering 5 Knights players; Mark Viduka, Danny Tiatto, Joe Spiteri, Frank Jurić and Steve Horvat. You also had Vinko Buljibašić and Joe Bacak who were part of the qualifying campaign, while Adrian Červinski, Damien Vojtek and Ante Juric were part of pre-qualifying friendlies.

The Knights are well known for giving young players opportunities in their senior squad. Players like; Marak Talajic debut at 16, Eddie Krncevic at 15, Josip Šimunić at 17, Steve Horvat at 17, Mark Viduka at 18, Mark Silić at 18, Billy Vojtek at 18 and more recently with Mate Dugandžić at 16. As such players that have gone through the club's junior ranks have always made up a large part the Knights squad, such as in the 1990s when the club dominated the NSL.

== Rivalries ==
=== Footscray JUST ===
The Melbourne Knights have had many rivalries over the years. The biggest and most heated rivalry was with Footscray JUST. JUST was a Yugoslav backed club so the hate between the clubs ran deep. JUST had links to the Yugoslav communist regime, a regime that many of the Knights supporter had escaped persecution from. These were as much political battles as they were soccer matches. This rivalry began in 1960 when the clubs first met (Melbourne Knights as Preston Croat) in the Victorian State League. The club's first win against JUST came in 1965 with a 2–1 victory in the Dockerty Cup semi-final. Their first victory against JUST in the Victorian State League also came in 1965 with a 2–1 win away at Olympic Park in Round 16. After the 1972 expulsion the club would not take on JUST for over a decade. The club's last victory against JUST in the Victorian State League came in round 17 of 1972, with a 2–0 win at Olympic Park in front of 4,500 fans. Billy Vojtek scored a double.

The rivalry was resumed in 1984 with the Melbourne Knights entering the NSL. In round 25 of 1984 Melbourne Knights defeated JUST 3–1, the first victory against JUST since 1972. 1989 saw what was the greatest victory the Melbourne Knights had against JUST. The two sides that finished at the bottom of the league ladder would be relegated. JUST went into the final round third last only a point ahead of the bottom two, JUST could not afford a loss. The highly anticipated match at Middle Park was played in front of 5,000 mostly Melbourne Knights fans. The Melbourne Knights in a dominant display defeated JUST 2–0, with goals coming from Joe Caleta and Zeljko Adzić. The result saw JUST drop down into the bottom two, relegating the club to the Victorian State League. It was the very last time the two sides ever met on the field and soon after JUST would fold.

Head-to-head All-Time

- Games: 35
- Knights wins: 13
- JUST wins: 12
- Draws: 10

=== South Melbourne ===
Since the relegation of Footscray JUST from the NSL, the fiercest rivalry for the Melbourne Knights has been against South Melbourne. It has also been the longest running rivalry for both clubs, with the Knights having played South Melbourne more times than any other club. The first time the two sides met was in 1960 in the Victorian Division 1 North. The first victory the club had over South Melbourne came in 1962 (as Preston Croat) in the group stage of the pre-season Ampol Cup with the Knights winning 1–0. While the first time the Knights defeated South Melbourne in the Victorian State League was in 1965, a 3–2 win at Olympic Park. In the NSL the two sides would have an intense rivalry, which was heightened by the success both sides had in the league. This was clearly seen in the incredible 10 occasions the two clubs met each other in the NSL finals. The first win against South in the NSL came in round 9 of 1985, 2–0. The club would go on to play many epic matches, the two most famous coming in the 90s. The first came in the 1990–91 Grand Final, which South Melbourne won on penalties. The other being the 1994–95 Major Semi-Final where the Knights won 3–2, with Mark Viduka scoring a spectacular hat-trick. That win booked a spot in the Grand Final for the club. The match is regarded as one of the greatest matches in the history of Australian club soccer. For the most part these matches have been tightly fought contests, but the biggest win the Knights had against South came in 2000–01 season when Knights defeated South 4–0. This rivalry which has gone on for over 50 years continues today in the Victorian Premier League. In 2005 the Melbourne Knights defeated South Melbourne for the first time ever at South's home ground of Bob Jane Stadium, something the Melbourne Knights were never able to achieve in the NSL. The rivalry continued in the modern era with South Melbourne defeating the Knights in an elimination semi-final in front of 5,000 fans. The Knights would get their revenge a year later by knocking South out of the FFA cup with a 2–0 victory at Lakeside Stadium.

Head-to-Head total NSL games

- Games: 54
- South wins:25
- Knights wins: 13
- Draws: 16
- South goals: 88
- Knights goals: 58

NSL Finals games only

- Games: 10
- Knights wins: 5
- South wins: 4
- Draws: 1

Head-to-Head State League/VPL

- Games: 54
- Knights wins: 15
- South wins: 28
- Draws: 11

Head-to-Head All-Time

- Games: 108
- Knights wins: 28
- South wins: 53
- Draws: 27

=== Perth Glory ===
Perth Glory was one of the first of the new non-ethnic clubs to be introduced by Soccer Australia's president David Hill. It was all a part of the plan to broaden the supporter base of the NSL and to restructure the league. The arrival of these clubs immediately created a rivalry between the ethnic and non-ethnic clubs of the NSL. The most heated of these was the rivalry between the Melbourne Knights and Perth Glory. The rivalry really kicked off in the last match of the 1996–97 regular season. Perth was in 6th spot, holding onto the last finals spot. Perth traveling to the Melbourne Croatia Sports Centre only needed a point to ensure a finals berth. While the Knights in 7th spot, 2 points behind Perth needed nothing less than a win to get the final spot. The match was played in front of 10,000 people. Perth took an early lead. But the Knights came back with an inspired performance by Tom Pondeljak, scoring a double. The Melbourne Knights won 3–1.

The rivalry was taken to new levels in the 2000–01 season when the two sides met once more, this time in the Finals. The first leg was played at the Melbourne Croatia Sports Centre. In front of just 7,000 fans, the two sides played out a 0–0. It was a match where Perth player Bobby Despotovski made a 3 fingered Serbian salute to Knights fans. After the match, he and others in the Perth squad were attacked by Knights fans as the Perth players boarded the team bus. It made headlines across Australia. In the second leg in Perth in front of 30,000 fans, the odds were stacked against the Knights. But the side put in a phenomenal performance being up 2–0 by the 30th minute. Perth came back to level it at 2–2, but the Knights took out the tie on the away goals rule. The two sides have not played each other since the end of the NSL in 2004.

=== Other ===
Other important rivalries have been with fellow Melbourne sides Preston Lions, Green Gully, Heidelberg United and Sunshine George Cross, both at state and national level. Matches against Preston in particular have traditionally attracted large crowds, while the rivalry with Green Gully was at its most fiercest in the early 80s when the 2 sides dominated the State League. The rivalry with Sunshine George Cross has seen George Cross become the most played team for the Melbourne Knights after South Melbourne, with the first clash between the 2 sides occurring back in 1960.

In the NSL the club had significant rivalries with Sydney Olympic, Marconi Fairfield and particularly Adelaide City. The Melbourne Knights and Adelaide City were the two dominant soccer powers in the early to mid 90s, they met each other 3 times in the NSL Grand Final. The club also has friendly rivalries with fellow Croatian backed clubs Sydney United and the St Albans Saints.

In the 2007 VPL season a new rivalry was born with the Serbian backed Springvale White Eagles. The two clubs had never met each other beforehand. In their first meeting the Knights won 1–0 at home, with a last minute free kick from Anthony Pelikan. It was the first time that the Knights had ever played a Serbian side in a league match in its long history. The second match ended in a 5–2 thrashing of the White Eagles. This rivalry resumed in the 2011 VPL season, with a 1–1 draw away and a 5–0 win at home for the Knights.

== Honours ==
Honours	No.	Years
National Soccer League
NSL Australian Champions	2	1994–95, 1995–96
NSL Minor Premiers	4	1990–91, 1991–92, 1993–94, 1994–95
NSL Cup Winners	1	1994–95
NSL Runner-Up	3	1990–91, 1991–92, 1993–94
NSL Regular Season Runner-Up	1	1995–96
NSL Finalists (Playoffs)	12	1984, 1985, 1989, 1989–90, 1990–91, 1991–92, 1993–94, 1994–95, 1995–96, 1996–97, 2000–01, 2001–02
NSL Cup Runner-Up	1	1984
National Youth League Champions	3	1989–90, 1996–97, 2000–01
National Youth League Runner-Up	2	1994–95, 2001–02
National Youth League (Southern Division) Champions	5	1989–90, 1994–95, 1996–97, 2000–01, 2001–02
State
Victorian Champions	3	1968, 1978, 1979
Victorian Runner-Up	5	1980, 1981, 1982, 1983, 2008
VPL Regular Season Runner-Up	3	2007, 2008, 2013
VPL Finalists (Playoffs)	5	2007, 2008, 2013, 2015, 2023
Victorian State League Cup (Top 4 Series) Winners	6	1971, 1978, 1979, 1980, 1981, 1983
Victorian State League Top 4 Finalists	11	1967, 1968, 1969, 1970, 1971, 1978, 1979, 1980, 1981, 1982, 1983
Dockerty Cup Winners	10	1968, 1969, 1979, 1980, 1983, 1985, 1988^, 1990, 1996, 2014
Dockerty Cup Runner-Up	6	1965, 1977, 1982, 1995, 2011, 2019
Ampol Cup/Buffalo Cup (Pre-Season Cup) Winners	8	1968, 1971, 1972, 1977, 1978, 1980, 1986, 1987
Ampol Cup/Buffalo Cup (Pre-Season Cup) Runner-Up	3	1969, 1984, 1985
Victorian Division One Champions	5	1959, 1961 (Preston Croat), 1962, 1964, 2026
Victorian Division Two Runner-Up	1	1958
Victorian Metropolitan/Provisional League Runner-Up	3	1954, 1955, 1957
Victorian Reserves Champions	5	1971, 1979, 1981, 1983, 2007
Victorian Division 1 Reserves Champions	1	1976
Other
Ansett Challenge Shield Winners	2	1986, 1987
Armstrong Cup Winners	2	1966, 1977
Australia Cup Qualification	4	2014, 2016, 2019, 2023
Inter City Cup Winners	1	1971
Inter City Cup Runner-Up	2	1968, 1972
Tynan Eyre Cup Winners	1	2001
Tynan Eyre Cup Runner-Up	3	1998, 1999, 2000
LG Cup Bronze Medalist (Hosted in Vietnam)	1	2001
Australian-Croatian Soccer Tournament Champions	7	1993, 2010, 2011, 2012, 2013, 2015, 2018

^Melbourne Knights stripped of the title for fielding an un-registered player

== NSL Grand Finals ==
Year	Champion	Runner up	Score	Goal Scorer	Melbourne Knights Lineup	Venue	Crowd
1990–1991	South Melbourne	Melbourne Croatia	1–1 (5–4 on penalties)	MK: Andrew Marth 25 min SM: Joe Palatsides 88 min	David Miller, Theo Selemidis, Mark Talajic, Alan Edward Davidson, George Hannah, Andrew Marth, Josip Biskic, Branko Milosevic (Mark Silic 105'), Joe Caleta (Paul Donnelly 110'), Ivan Kelic, Francis Awaritefe	Olympic Park	23,318
1991–1992	Adelaide City	Melbourne Croatia	0–0 (4–2 on penalties)		David Miller, Theo Selemidis, Mark Talajic, Alan Edward Davidson, George Hannah, Andrew Marth, Josip Biskic (Mark Silic 106'), Paul Donnelly (Vlado Vanis 70'), Ivan Kelic, Francis Awaritefe, Damian Mori	Olympic Park	15,463
1993–1994	Adelaide City	Melbourne Knights	1–0	AC: Damian Mori 68 min	David Miller, Vlado Vanis (Oliver Pondeljak 75'), Steve Horvat, Vinko Buljubasic (Mark Silic 18'), David Cervinski, Fausto De Amicis, Andrew Marth, Josip Biskic, Zoran Trajcevski, Adrian Cervinski, Mark Viduka	Olympic Park	13,970
1994–1995	Melbourne Knights	Adelaide City	2–0	MK: Andrew Marth 36 min, Joe Spiteri 41 min	Frank Juric, Steve Horvat, Vinko Buljubasic, David Cervinski, Fausto De Amicis, Andrew Marth, Mark Silic, Kresimir Marusic (Damir Grganovic 87'), Joe Spiteri, Oliver Pondeljak (Ante Kovacevic 64'), Mark Viduka	Hindmarsh Stadium	15,573
1995–1996	Melbourne Knights	Marconi Stallions	2–1	MK: Andrew Marth 58 min, Adrian Cervinski 74 min MS: Andy Harper 78 min	Vilson Knezevic, Josip Simunic, Ante Kovacevic (Vinko Buljubasic 46'), Zoran Markovski, David Cervinski, Fausto De Amicis, Andrew Marth, Lubo Lapsansky, Tom Pondeljak (Joe Bacak 75'), John Markovski (Dragi Nastevski 81'), Adrian Cervinski	Olympic Park	14,258

== NSL record ==
Chart of yearly table positions for Melbourne Knights in NSL

Regular season matches

Played	Wins	Draws	Losses	GF	GA	Points
549	240	121	188	842	736	841

Finals (Playoffs) Matches

Played	Wins	Draws	Losses	GF	GA	Points
30	8	9	13	34	45	33

Overall

Played	Wins	Draws	Losses	GF	GA	Points
579	248	130	201	876	781	874

== All-time national league table ==
Melbourne Knights is ranked 5th out of 46 clubs that have competed in the national competition (NSL and A-League):

	Played	Wins	Draws	Losses	Points	Pts per match	%Win
South Melbourne	791	378	183	230	1317	1.66	47.79%
Marconi Fairfield	786	356	186	244	1254	1.59	45.29%
Sydney Olympic	770	325	192	253	1167	1.515	42.21%
Adelaide City	768	321	194	253	1157	1.506	41.80%
Melbourne Knights	579	248	130	201	880	1.519	42.83%
Sydney United	576	239	144	193	861	1.494	41.50%

== All-time record ==
=== NSL history to VPL 1954–2013 ===
Season	League	Position	P	W	D	L	GF	GA	Pts
1954	Provisional League	RUNNER-UP	10	5	2	3	34	20	17
1955	Metropolitan League: South	RUNNER-UP	13	10	0	3	52	20	30
1956	Metropolitan League: South	4th	14	6	3	5	31	25	21
1957	Metropolitan League: South	RUNNER-UP	18	12	3	3	44	22	39
1958	Division 2: North	RUNNER-UP	18	15	1	2	74	17	46
1959	Division 1: North	CHAMPIONS	18	14	2	2	81	22	44
1960	Victorian State League (Preston Croat)	11th	22	5	2	15	30	65	17
1960	Division 1: North (SC Croatia)	5th	18	9	3	6	34	27	30
1961	Division 1: South (Preston Croat)	CHAMPIONS	18	16	2	0	62	21	50
1961	Division 1: North (SC Croatia)	3rd	18	13	1	4	63	22	40
1962	Victorian State League (Preston Croat)	10th	22	5	4	13	21	45	19
1962	Division 1: North (SC Croatia)	CHAMPIONS	22	19	1	2	67	11	58
1963	Victorian State League	11th	22	5	6	11	28	51	21
1964	Division 1	CHAMPIONS	22	18	3	1	75	18	57
1965	Victorian State League	6th	22	11	3	8	41	28	36
1966	Victorian State League	5th	22	10	3	9	39	27	33
1967	Victorian State League	3rd	22	11	5	6	41	25	38
1968	Victorian State League	CHAMPIONS	22	15	3	4	42	19	48
1969	Victorian State League	4th	22	11	4	7	40	24	37
1970	Victorian State League	4th	22	10	7	5	36	20	37
1971	Victorian State League	3rd	22	11	5	6	33	21	38
1972	Victorian State League	Disqualified — crowd disturbances	22	7	5	10	27	19	26
1973	Did not compete	–	–	–	–	–	–	–	–
1974	Did not compete	–	–	–	–	–	–	–	–
1975	Division 1 (Essendon Lions)	7th	22	8	5	9	25	28	29
1976	Division 1 (Essendon Lions)	3rd	22	11	8	3	32	17	41
1977	Victorian State League (Essendon Lions)	7th	22	8	4	10	28	24	28
1978	Victorian State League	CHAMPIONS	22	17	2	3	49	11	53
1979	Victorian State League	CHAMPIONS	22	12	6	4	43	18	42
1980	Victorian State League	RUNNER-UP	22	12	8	2	37	16	44
1981	Victorian State League	RUNNER-UP	22	12	6	4	41	20	42
1982	Victorian State League	RUNNER-UP	26	15	5	6	52	28	50
1983	Victorian State League	RUNNER-UP	26	21	2	3	72	14	65
1984	National Soccer League: Southern Conference	3rd	28	13	7	8	38	31	46
	Finals	Preliminary Final	3	1	0	2	5	7	3
1985	National Soccer League: Southern Conference	5th	22	9	6	7	29	21	33
	Finals	Elimination Final	1	0	0	1	1	2	0
1986	National Soccer League: Southern Conference	10th	22	6	6	10	25	33	24
1987	National Soccer League	9th	24	9	5	10	22	30	32
1988	National Soccer League	9th	26	9	6	11	28	33	33
1989	National Soccer League	4th	26	13	5	8	44	35	44
	Finals	Minor Semi-Final	2	1	0	1	4	3	3
1989–1990	National Soccer League	3rd	26	14	7	5	49	26	49
	Finals	Preliminary Final	3	0	1	2	2	4	1
1990–1991	National Soccer League	1st	26	15	7	4	55	39	52
	Finals	RUNNER-UP	2	1	1	0	2	1	4
1991–1992	National Soccer League	1st	26	14	7	5	45	26	49
	Finals	RUNNER-UP	2	0	2	0	0	0	2
1992–1993	National Soccer League	10th	26	10	4	12	38	39	34
1993–1994	National Soccer League	1st	26	16	5	5	59	24	53
	Finals	RUNNER-UP	3	1	1	1	4	4	4
1994–1995	National Soccer League	1st	24	16	4	4	56	25	52
	Finals	CHAMPIONS	4	2	0	2	6	5	6
1995–1996	National Soccer League	2nd	33	17	8	8	50	28	59
	Finals	CHAMPIONS	3	2	1	0	5	3	7
1996–1997	National Soccer League	6th	26	11	6	9	36	32	39
	Finals	Elimination Final	2	0	0	2	1	7	0
1997–1998	National Soccer League	7th	26	11	6	9	37	35	39
1998–1999	National Soccer League	12th	28	8	5	15	32	43	29
1999–2000	National Soccer League	12th	34	13	6	15	44	57	45
2000–2001	National Soccer League	6th	28	12	7	9	55	46	43
	Finals	Minor Semi-Final	3	0	2	1	2	3	1
2001–2002	National Soccer League	6th	24	11	3	10	41	40	36
	Finals	Elimination Final	2	0	1	1	2	6	1
2002–2003	National Soccer League	9th	24	7	6	11	38	52	27
2003–2004	National Soccer League	12th	24	6	5	13	21	41	23
2005	Victorian Premier League	9th	26	8	9	9	29	34	33
2006	Victorian Premier League	11th	26	8	6	12	33	39	30
2007	Victorian Premier League	2nd	26	14	5	7	38	21	47
	Finals	Preliminary Final	3	1	0	2	2	3	3
2008	Victorian Premier League	2nd	26	14	10	2	47	25	52
	Finals	RUNNER-UP	4	1	2	1	4	4	5
2009	Victorian Premier League	9th	22	7	6	9	26	25	27
2010	Victorian Premier League	9th	22	7	5	10	30	37	26
2011	Victorian Premier League	10th	24	8	7	9	39	33	31
2012	Victorian Premier League	8th	22	9	2	11	25	30	29
2013	Victorian Premier League	2nd	22	11	6	5	31	26	37
	Finals	Minor Semi-Final	2	0	0	2	2	5	0

=== NPL Victoria (2014-Present) ===
Season	League									NPL Vic Finals	Australian Championship	Australia Cup
Season	League (Tier)	P	W	D	L	GF	GA	Pts	Position	NPL Vic Finals	Australian Championship	Australia Cup
2014	NPL Victoria (1)	26	12	2	12	41	36	38	5th	—	—	Round of 32
2015	NPL Victoria (1)	26	15	5	6	39	27	50	4th	Preliminary Finals	—	6th Round
2016	NPL Victoria (1)	26	9	4	13	30	51	31	9th	—	—	Round of 16
2017	NPL Victoria (1)	26	6	6	14	31	48	24	12th	—	—	6th Round
2018	NPL Victoria (1)	26	9	5	12	45	53	32	9th	—	—	4th Round
2019	NPL Victoria (1)	26	10	4	12	35	42	31	10th	—	—	Round of 32
2020	NPL Victoria (1) *canceled part way through due to COVID-19	5	0	2	3	7	16	2	11th	Canceled due to COVID-19	—	Canceled due to COVID-19
2021	NPL Victoria (1) *canceled part way through due to COVID-19	18	7	5	6	24	26	26	8th	Canceled due to COVID-19	—	5th Round
2022	NPL Victoria (1)	26	9	3	14	36	40	30	9th	—	—	7th Round
2023	NPL Victoria (1)	26	14	5	7	51	35	47	4th	Semi Final	—	Semi Final
2024	NPL Victoria (1)	26	10	5	11	43	37	35	7th	—	—	4th Round
2025	NPL Victoria (1)	26	4	3	19	28	72	15	14th	—	DNQ	6th Round

Key

- Italics:season is still ongoing

== Men's Team of the Century ==
In 2003 to commemorate the 50th anniversary of the Melbourne Knights, the club named its team of the century:

- 1. Peter Blasby: Goal Keeper (1978–1985)
- 2. George Hannah: Defender (1983–1993)
- 3. Steve Horvat: Defender (1993–1996, 2000–2003)
- 4. Steve Kokoska: Defender (1977–1983)
- 5. Andrew Marth: Defender (1989–1998, 2000–2004)
- 6. Jimmy Mackay: Midfielder (1965–1972)
- 7. Tommy Cumming: Midfielder (1978–1985)
- 8. Josip Biskic (VC): Midfielder (1982–1995)
- 9. Billy Vojtek: Striker (1962–1972, 1977–1978)
- 10. Horst Rau (C): Midfielder (1961–1972)
- 11. Mark Viduka: Striker (1993–1995)

Substitutes:

- 12. Mirko Kovaček: Goal Keeper
- 13. Hammy McMeechan: Midfielder
- 14. Josip Šimunić: Defender
- 15. Danny Tiatto: Midfielder
- 16. Kenny Murphy: Midfielder
- 17. John Gardiner: Defender

Coach: Mijo Kis (1966–1970, 1972, 1982)

Other Nominees:

- Keith Adams
- Bozo Bašić
- Mirko Bažić (coach)
- Ante Bilaver
- David Červinski
- Adrian Červinski
- Fausto De Amicis
- Steve Gojević
- Ivan Gruičić
- Ivan Kelić
- Ante Kuželek
- Billy McArthur
- Bill McIntyre
- David Miller
- Branko Milošević
- Tom Pondeljak
- Mark Talajić

== International Men's players ==
The club has had and produced many players who have been Australian internationals (including 4 Socceroo captains), along with several Croatian internationals. These include:

Australia

- Željko Adžić
- Francis Awaritefe
- Yakka Banovic
- Jim Campbell
- Pablo Cardozo
- Jason Čulina
- Tommy Cumming
- Alan Edward Davidson (C)
- Fausto De Amicis
- Robbie Dunn
- Ivan Franjic
- Eugene Galekovic
- Steve Horvat (C)
- Ante Juric
- Frank Jurić
- Steve Kokoska
- Eddie Krnčević (C)
- Adrian Leijer
- Peter Lewis
- Jimmy Mackay
- John Markovski
- Andrew Marth
- Hammy McMeechan
- Ljubo Miličević
- Branko Milosevic
- Damian Mori
- Kenny Murphy
- Jeff Olver
- Sasa Ognenovski
- Con Opasinis
- Tom Pondeljak
- Joel Porter
- Matthew Spiranovic
- Joe Spiteri
- Theo Selemidis
- Mark Talajic
- Danny Tiatto
- Kris Trajanovski
- Rodrigo Vargas
- Mark Viduka (C)
- Billy Vojtek

Angola

- Toto Da Costa

Burundi

- Elvis Kamsoba

Croatia

- Željko Adžić
- Joey Didulica
- Josip Šimunić

Curaçao

- Gevaro Nepomuceno

England

- Peter Beardsley
- Kevin Townson (youth international)

Ghana

- Ransford Banini (youth international)

Hong Kong

- Ross Greer

Ireland

- Ryan Casey (youth international)
- John Fitzgerald (youth international)
- Shaun Timmins (youth international)

Lebanon

- Michael Reda

New Zealand

- Vaughan Coveny
- Greg Draper
- Brian Davidson
- Louis Fenton
- Jason Hicks
- Chris Jackson
- Leo Shin
- Paul Urlović
- Kayne Vincent
- Hamish Watson (youth international)
- Trevor Zwetsloot (youth international)

Papua New Guinea

- Tommy Semmy

Scotland

- Duncan MacKay
- William McLachlan (youth international)
- Ian Wallace

Solomon Islands

- Henry Fa'arodo

Uruguay

- Gustavo Biscayzacú (youth international)

Wales

- Peter Davies

Yugoslavia

- Stjepan Lamza

== Individual awards ==
Johnny Warren Medal: NSL Player of the Year

- 1989–1990: Zeljko Adžić
- 1991–1992: Josip Biskic
- 1993–1994: Mark Viduka
- 1994–1995: Mark Viduka

Coach of the Year

- 1993–1994: Mirko Bažić
- 1994–1995: Mirko Bažić

NSL Top Goal Scorer

- 1993–1994: Mark Viduka
- 1994–1995: Mark Viduka

Sam Papasavas Award: Under 21 NSL Player of the Year

- 1993–1994: Mark Viduka
- 1994–1995: Mark Viduka

NSL Goalkeeper of the Year

- 1995–1996: Frank Juric

Joe Marston Medal: NSL Grand Final Man of the Match

- 1990–1991: Josip Biskic
- 1994–1995: Steve Horvat
- 1995–1996: Andrew Marth

Victorian Premier League Gold Medal: VPL Player of the Year

- 1978: Tommy Cumming
- 1979: Tommy Cumming
- 2013: Marijan Cvitkovic

Bill Fleming Medal: Media voted VPL Player of the Year

- 1978: Tommy Cumming
- 1979: Tommy Cumming
- 2010: Kevin Townson

Victorian Premier League Coach of the Year

- 2008: Chris Taylor
- 2023: Ben Cahn

Jimmy Rooney Medal: VPL Grand Final Man of the Match

- 2008: Craig Elvin

Victorian Premier League Goalkeeper of the Year

- 2015: Chris May

Victorian Premier League Under 21 Player of the Year

- 2010: Adrian Zahra

Weinstein Medal Junior Player of the Year

- 1996: Ljubo Miličević

== Top Men's goal-scorers ==
- 1954 to 1961: Unknown
- 1962: Horst Rau 6 (Preston Croat), Billy Vojtek (SC Croatia)
- 1963: Jim Fernie 12
- 1964: Billy Vojtek
- 1965: Ian Currie 15
- 1966: Billy Vojtek 9, Hammy McMeechan 8
- 1967: Billy Vojtek 15, Jimmy Mackay 10
- 1968: Bill McIntyre 11
- 1969: Jimmy Mackay 12
- 1970: Bill McIntyre 10, Billy Vojtek 9
- 1971: Ibro Hadiavdić 5, Joe Touricar 5
- 1972: Ante Kuželek 6
- 1975: Unknown
- 1976: Nick Kuzmanov
- 1977: Kenny Murphy 8
- 1978: Tommy Cumming 12, Eddie Krncevic 8
- 1979: Carl Gilder 14, Tommy Cumming 9
- 1980: Carl Gilder 8, Noel Mitten 6, Joe Tront 5
- 1981: Noel Mitten 10, Keith Adams 6, David Brogan 5
- 1982: David Brogan 18, Ossie Latif 12
- 1983: David Brogan 21, Tommy Cumming 19, Ossie Latif 11
- 1984: David Brogan 9 (2 finals), Steve Gojevic 8 (1 finals), Tommy Cumming 7 (1 finals)
- 1985: Gary Ward 8
- 1986: Paul Lewis 6
- 1987: Paul Lewis 10
- 1988: Paul Lewis 13
- 1989: Željko Adžić 13 (2 finals), Ivan Kelic 11, Francis Awaritefe 10
- 1989–90: Željko Adžić 11, Francis Awaritefe 8 (1 finals), Joe Caleta 8 (1 finals), Ivan Kelic 6
- 1990–91: Ivan Kelić 17 goals, Francis Awaritefe 11 (1 finals)
- 1991–92: Francis Awaritefe 14, Damian Mori 11
- 1992–93: Oliver Pondeljak 10, Ivan Kelic 9
- 1993–94: Mark Viduka 17 (1 finals), Adrian Cervinski 11 (2 finals), Andrew Marth 9
- 1994–95: Mark Viduka 21 (3 finals), Joe Spiteri 11 (1 finals)
- 1995–96: Andrew Marth 10 (1 finals), Joe Spiteri 9, Tom Pondeljak 9 (1 finals)
- 1996–97: Adrian Červinski 13 (1 finals), Ice Kutlesovski 10
- 1997–98: Tom Pondeljak 11, Ivan Kelic 11
- 1998–99: Ivan Kelić 10
- 1999–00: Adrian Červinski 11, Ivan Kelic 11
- 2000–01: Adrian Červinski 13 (1 finals), Joel Porter 12, Toto Da Costa 11
- 2001–02: Joel Porter 12 (1 finals), Toto Da Costa 11
- 2002–03: Anthony Pelikan 10, Gustavo Biscayzacu 7
- 2003–04: Anthony Pelikan 7
- 2005: Nathan Caldwell 9
- 2006: Nathan Caldwell 8, Andrew Barisic 7
- 2007: Anthony Pelikan 8 (1 finals), Joe Spiteri 6 (1 finals)
- 2008: Andrew Barisic 19 (1 finals), Joe Spiteri 8 (1 finals)
- 2009: Greg Draper 7, Joshua Groenewald 6
- 2010: Kevin Townson 13, Jean-Charles Dubois 8
- 2011: Jacob Colosimo 10
- 2012: Jake Nakic 6
- 2013: Andrew Barisic 8 (1 Finals), Jacob Colosimo 6
- 2014: Stipo Andrijasevic 6, Daniel Visevic 6
- 2015: Andrew Barisic 9, Stipo Andrijasevic 9 (1 finals)
- 2016: Stipo Andrijasevic 6, James McGarry 6, Jacob Colosimo 5
- 2017: Tom Cahill 8, Jason Hicks 7
- 2018: Tomislav Uskok 9, Nate Foster 8, Marijan Cvitkovic 8
- 2019: Hamish Watson 9
- 2020: Hamish Watson 5
- 2021: Gian Albano 7
- 2022: Gian Albano 12
- 2023: Gian Albano 11 (1 finals)
- 2024: Ciaran Bramwell 13, Gian Albano 8

== Best and Fairest Award ==
- 1954 to 1961: Unknown
- 1962: Billy Vojtek
- 1963 to 1964: Unknown
- 1965: Duncan MacKay
- 1966: Hammy McMeechan
- 1967: Hammy McMeechan
- 1968: Hammy McMeechan
- 1969: Horst Rau
- 1970: Bill McIntyre
- 1971: Jimmy Mackay
- 1972: Ante Kuželek
- 1975: Unknown
- 1976: Unknown
- 1977: Ante Bilaver
- 1978: Tommy Cumming
- 1979: Tommy Cumming
- 1980: Steve Kokoska
- 1981: Steve Kokoska
- 1982: Keith Adams
- 1983: Tommy Cumming
- 1984: Josip Biskic
- 1985: Steve Gojevic
- 1986: Jim Campbell
- 1987: George Hannah
- 1988: Alan Davidson
- 1989: Željko Adžić
- 1989–90: Željko Adžić
- 1990–91: Andrew Marth
- 1991–92: {Joe Biskic /Theo Selemidis Joint Winners
- 1992–93: Andrew Marth
- 1993–94: Mark Viduka
- 1994–95: Mark Viduka
- 1995–96: Josip Simunic
- 1996–97: Andrew Marth
- 1997–98: Andrew Marth
- 1998–99: Joe Didulica
- 1999–00: Zeljko Susa
- 2000–01: Rodrigo Vargas
- 2001–02: Rodrigo Vargas
- 2002–03: Nick Sabljak
- 2003–04: Anthony Pelikan
- 2005: Adrian Cagalj
- 2006: Neven Antic
- 2007: Steve Iosifidis
- 2008: Craig Elvin
- 2009: Matthew Grbesa
- 2010: Tomislav Skara
- 2011: Anthony Colosimo
- 2012: Ben Surey
- 2013: Ben Surey
- 2014: Tomislav Uskok
- 2015: Stipo Andrijasevic
- 2016: Jason Hicks
- 2017: Elvis Kamsoba

== Notable former coaches ==
- Jimmy Adam
- Josip Biskic
- Miron Bleiberg
- Luka Bonačić
- Branko Čulina
- Ian Dobson
- Brian Edgley
- Terry Hennessey
- Domagoj Kapetanovic
- Duncan MacKay
- Andrew Marth
- Kenny Murphy
- Peter Ollerton
- Ian Wallace
- Aljoša Asanović
- Dean Računica
- Ivan Franjic
- John Markovski

== Club records ==
- Best Result in the NSL: W 8–1 v Wollongong Macedonia at Knights Stadium (h) 7 March 1991
- Worst Result in the NSL: L 0–6 v Adelaide City at Hindmarsh Stadium (a) 7 April 1991
- Best Result in State Competitions: W 29–1 v Brunswick Latvia at Corio Oval (h) 29 August 1959
- Best Regular season NSL Crowd (home): 11,415 v South Melbourne at Knights Stadium 5 March 2000
- Best Finals Series NSL Crowd: 23,318 vs South Melbourne (1990–91 Grand Final) at Olympic Park
- Biggest Unbeaten Streak: 21 games: August 1960 to March 1962 (as Preston Croat)
- Biggest Winning Streak: 15 games: (as SC Croatia) March to July 1962; (as Preston Croat) August 1960 to July 1961
- Biggest Winning Streak in the NSL: 7 games (in 1994)
- Biggest Unbeaten Streak in the NSL: 12 games (in 1984)
- Biggest Losing Streak in the NSL: 4 games (in 1998, and again in 1999)
- Biggest Streak Without a Win in the NSL: 8 games (in 1998–99 and again in 1999–2000)
- Biggest Unbeaten Streak in the VPL: 19 games (in 2008)
- Most Goals in a Season (as a club): 81 goals in 1959
- Most Wins in a Season: 21 wins in 1983
- Most Points in a Season: 66 points in 1995–96
- Most Goals in a Match (NSL): Ivan Kelić 6 goals v Wollongong Macedonia at Knights Stadium (h) 7 March 1991
- Most Red Cards in the NSL: Andrew Marth 6 red cards
- Most Consecutive Clean Sheets in the NSL: Peter Blasby 7 matches (in 1984)
- Most Matches in the NSL: Josip Biskic 282 matches
- Most Matches All-Time: Josip Biskic 328 matches
- Most Goals in the NSL: Ivan Kelić 75 goals
- Most Goals All-Time: Ivan Kelić 75 goals
- Most Goals in a Season: 21 Mark Viduka in 1994–1995; David Brogan in 1983
- Best Games to Goal Ratio: 0.83 Mark Viduka 40 goals in 48 games
- Most Games Coached All-Time: Andrew Marth 150 games
- Most Seasons at the Club: Josip Biskic 14

== See also ==
- 1. Various works of soccer historian Roy Hay
- 2. Statistics from OzFootball
- 3. The Melbourne Knights website
- 4. 'Ethnicity and Soccer in Australia' academic study

Preceded by Adelaide City	NSL Champions; 1994/95–1995/96	Succeeded by Brisbane Strikers
Preceded by Melbourne Hungaria	VPL Champions; 1968	Succeeded by Footscray JUST
Preceded by Sunshine George Cross FC	VPL Champions; 1978–1979	Succeeded by Preston Lions
