= Essendon Lions SC =

Essendon Lions
- Full name: Essendon Lions Soccer Club
- Founded: 1953 as Lions Soccer Club

Essendon Lions was a football (soccer) club from the Melbourne suburb of Essendon, Victoria. At the club's peak in the 1960s and 1970s it played in the Victorian State League, the top league in Victoria at the time.

== Honours ==
- Victorian Division 1 Champions – 1961 (North)
- Victorian Division 2 Champions – 1960
- Victorian Metropolitan League South Runners-Up: 1956, 1957

== League record ==
League positions since 1956

== Club history ==
Essendon Lions was formed as the Lions Soccer Club (Ukrainian: УСК (Український соккеровий клуб) «Леви» (Мельбурн), romanized: USK (Ukrainskyi Soccerovyi Club) "Levy" (Melbourne)) in 1953 by migrants from Ukraine in Australia. The club was named after the capital of Western Ukraine, Lviv (Coat of arms of Lviv).

In 1960, the club came first in the Second Division and were promoted to the First Division. In 1961, the club came first in the First Division and were promoted to the Victorian State League. In 1971, a ten-year lease in Victorian State League the club was relegated to Victorian Metropolitan League Division 1.

In 1974 club members of SC Croatia took over the financially struggling Essendon Lions. The first step occurred with the appointment of the influential SC Croatia figure Tony Vrzina as coach of the Essendon Lions late in the 1974 season, rescuing the club from relegation. With the completion of the season a total take-over of the club took place, with Croatia paying $25,000 to the Lions to take control of the club and the facilities at Montgomery Park in Essendon.
