= 1999–2000 Perth Glory SC season =

Perth Glory SC
1999–2000 season
- Owners: Nick Tana; Paul Afkos
- Coach: Bernd Stange
- Stadium: Perth Oval (league); Subiaco Oval (finals)
- National Soccer League: 1st
- Top goalscorer: Con Boutsianis and Alistair Edwards (13)
- Highest home attendance: 16,176 (league); 43,242 (finals)
- Lowest home attendance: 9,328 (league); 42,760 (finals)

The 1999–2000 Perth Glory SC season was the club's fourth in the Australian National Soccer League (NSL). The club won the NSL minor premiership as the leading team in the league. In the Grand Final, the Glory missed out on the NSL championship when they lost in a penalty shoot-out after surrendering a 3–0 half-time lead.

== Background ==
In 1998–99, Perth Glory finished third on the NSL table, being eliminated in the preliminary final by eventual losing grand-finalists Sydney United.

Perth Glory entered the 1999–2000 season as one of the favourites to win the championship, with SportsTAB offering odds of 4/1, placing them second to South Melbourne (7/2). Ray Gatt in The Australian predicted the Glory as champion, calling the signings of Kasey Wehrman, Peter Buljan and Hamilton Thorp "coups" while former Australia national soccer team coach Rale Rasic in Action Soccer tipped the Glory as runners-up.

== Season review ==
=== Coaching ===
In February 2000, Glory chairman Nic Tana announced that coach Bernd Stange would be leaving the club at the end of the season. Despite club management and the board agreeing to a two-year contract extension, Tana as 75 percent club shareholder, had called a shareholder meeting and blocked the extension. The decision was unpopular with supporters with a protest occurring before the round 23 match against Canberra Cosmos. In late February, Tana reversed his decision and offered Stange a new one-year contract. In April, Stange finally agreed to the new deal.

=== Final series ===
As minor premiers, Perth Glory won the right to proceed to week two of the NSL finals. In the first leg of the major semi-final, they lost to Wollongong Wolves 1–0 at Brandon Park, the Wolves' home ground.

The second leg of the major semi-final was held at Subiaco Oval, rather than their regular venue Perth Oval, to accommodate an expected larger crowd. In the match, Perth Glory win 2–0 over the Wolves, 2–1 on aggregate, to qualify for the grand final. The crowd of 42,764 was an Australian record for a club soccer match. In the wake of the record crowd, the Western Australian government announced a purpose-built stadium for the Glory in central Perth.

The 2000 National Soccer League Grand Final was held at Subiaco on 11 June. The match was seemingly over at halftime, with Perth Glory leading 3–0, however the Wolves came back to draw the match in the 89th minute. The score remained 3–3 at the completion of extra time, with the match going to a penalty shootout to determine the champion. Wollongong won the shootout 7–6 with James Afkos, son of Glory co-owner Paul Afkos, missing a penalty. The crowd of 43,242 was a new record for an Australian club soccer match, standing until 2006. The match was also the first national league grand final to feature teams not aligned with a particular ethnic group.

== Results ==
=== Legend ===
Win	Draw	Loss

=== League ===
Round	Date	Opponents	Venue	Result	Scorers	Attendance	Ref
Round 1	2 October 1999	Gippsland Falcons	A	1–0	Boutsianis	2,155	
Round 2	10 October 1999	Marconi-Fairfield	H	3–3	Ergić, Despotovski, Boutsianis	16,176	
Round 3	17 October 1999	Melbourne Knights	A	3–0	Magdić (og), Boutsianis, Despotovski	3,360	
Round 4	24 October 1999	Adelaide Force	H	0–0		13,390	
Round 5	29 October 1999	Canberra Cosmos	A	1–1	Boutsianis	3,760	
Round 6	7 November 1999	Brisbane Strikers	H	1–2	Despotovski	14,077	
Round 7	12 November 1999	Parramatta Power	A	1–3	A Edwards	6,076	
Round 8	21 November 1999	Melbourne Knights	H	6–1	Boutsianis, A Edwards (2), Ergić (2), S Miller	11,027	
Round 9	28 November 1999	Carlton	H	4–2	Ergić (2), S Miller, A Edwards	11,838	
Round 10	5 December 1999	Sydney United	A	1–0	Despotovski	4,480	
Round 11	12 December 1999	South Melbourne	H	3–1	A Edwards, Despotovski, Boutsianis	12,385	
Round 12	17 December 1999	Newcastle Breakers	A	2–3	Despotovski, T Halpin	4,127	
Round 13	28 December 1999	Marconi-Fairfield	H	1–0	Boutsianis	13,153	
Round 14	3 January 2000	Sydney Olympic	A	1–1	Boutsianis	8,134	
Round 15	9 January 2000	Gippsland Falcons	H	1–0	Ergić	12,199	
Round 16	14 January 2000	Northern Spirit	A	1–1	Boutsianis	11,128	
Round 17	26 March 2000	Football Kingz	H	3–1	G Naven, J Harnwell, Aurélio Schwertz	9,784	
Round 18	26 January 2000	Football Kingz	A	1–4	T Halpin	3,878	
Round 19	30 January 2000	Wollongong Wolves	H	2–1	Buljan, A Edwards	9,657	
Round 20	6 February 2000	Marconi-Fairfield	A	1–1	Ergić	4,597	
Round 21	13 February 2000	Melbourne Knights	H	2–2	Boutsianis (2)	11,270	
Round 22	18 February 2000	Adelaide Force	A	2–1	Boutsianis, A Edwards	4,880	
Round 23	27 February 2000	Canberra Cosmos	H	3–2	A Edwards (2), Boutsianis	13,158	
Round 24	4 March 2000	Brisbane Strikers	A	3–1	Trajkovski, A Edwards, Aurélio Schwertz	2,307	
Round 25	12 March 2000	Parramatta Power	H	2–1	Aurélio Schwertz, Trajkovski	11,737	
Round 26	18 March 2000	Melbourne Knights	A	0–1		5,457	
Round 27	24 March 2000	Carlton	A	1–3	Despotovski	1,749	
Round 28	2 April 2000	Sydney United	H	2–0	A Edwards, Ergić	10,275	
Round 29	9 April 2000	South Melbourne	A	2–1	A Edwards (2)	5,833	
Round 30	16 April 2000	Newcastle Breakers	H	1–2	Aurélio Schwertz	11,003	
Round 31	21 April 2000	Marconi-Fairfield	A	2–3	Trajkovski, Milicevic	5,721	
Round 32	25 April 2000	Sydney Olympic	H	1–0	Ergić	9,328	
Round 33	30 April 2000	Wollongong Wolves	A	1–0	J Harnwell	8,815	
Round 34	7 May 2000	Northern Spirit	H	1–0	J Harnwell	13,554	

=== Final series ===
Round	Date	Opponents	Venue	Result	Scorers	Attendance	Ref
Major semi-final leg 1	21 May 2000	Wollongong Wolves	A	0–1		8,326	
Major semi-final leg 2	27 May 2000	Wollongong Wolves	H	2–0	Trajkovski, Ergić	42,760	
2000 NSL Grand Final	11 June 2000	Wollongong Wolves	H	3–3 (a.s.d.e.t.); 6–7 (penalties)	Despotovski, Milicevic, J Harnwell	43,242	

== Squad statistics ==
No.	Pos.	Name	League		Finals		Total	
No.	Pos.	Name	Apps	Goals	Apps	Goals	Apps	Goals
1	GK	(Australia) Danny Milosevic	0	0	0	0	0	0
2	DF	(Australia) Robert Trajkovski	32	3	3	1	35	4
3	DF	(Australia) Jamie Harnwell	28	3	3	1	31	4
4	FW	(Brazil) Aurelio Schwertz	15	4	3	0	18	4
5	DF	(Australia) Vinko Buljubasic	3	0	0	0	3	0
6	MF	(Australia) Gareth Naven	33	1	3	0	36	1
7	DF	(Australia) Scott Miller	32	2	3	0	35	2
8	MF	(Australia) Troy Halpin	21	2	3	0	24	2
9	FW	(Australia) Alistair Edwards	30	13	3	0	33	13
10	FW	(Australia) Bobby Despotovski	24	7	3	1	27	8
11	FW	(Australia) Kasey Wehrman	17	0	3	0	20	0
12	FW	(Australia) Peter Buljan	13	1	0	0	13	1
13	MF	(Australia) James Afkos	26	0	1	0	27	0
14	DF	(Chile) Dion Valle	20	0	1	0	21	0
15	MF	(Brazil) Edgar Aldrighi Junior	32	0	3	0	35	0
16	MF	(Australia) Con Boutsianis	21	13	0	0	21	13
17	FW	(Australia) Vas Kalogeracos	2	0	0	0	2	0
18	FW	(Australia) Hamilton Thorp	17	0	0	0	17	0
19	MF	(Australia) John Carbone	22	0	0	0	22	0
20	GK	(Australia) Tony Franken	8	0	0	0	8	0
21	MF	(Serbia and Montenegro) Ivan Ergić	30	9	2	1	32	10
22	DF	(Australia) Ljubo Milicevic	5	1	3	1	8	2
23	GK	(Australia) Jason Petkovic	26	0	3	0	29	0
24	DF	(Australia) Aaron Cole	0	0	0	0	0	0
25	MF	(Australia) Gary Faria	1	0	0	0	1	0
30	GK	(Australia) Tom Tomich	0	0	0	0	0	0

Statistics accurate as at the end of the 1999–2000 NSL season.

== Transfers ==
=== In ===
Player	To	Ref
(Australia) Peter Buljan	Canberra Cosmos	
(Serbia and Montenegro) Ivan Ergić	Australian Institute of Sport	
(Australia) Kasey Wehrman	Brisbane Strikers	
(Chile) Dion Valle	Macarthur Rams	
(Australia) Hamilton Thorp	Adelaide Sharks	
(Brazil) Edgar Júnior		
(Brazil) Aurélio Schwertz		
(Australia) Ljubo Milicevic	Melbourne Knights	
(Russia) Vyacheslav Melnikov	Pahang FA	

=== Out ===
Player	To	Ref
(New Zealand) Danny Hay	Leeds United	
(Australia) Craig Deans	Carlton	
(New Zealand) Gavin Wilkinson	Kings FC	
(Australia) Paul Strudwick	Retired	
(Australia) John Markovski	Carlton	
(Australia) Vasco Trpcevski	Newcastle Breakers	
(Australia) Michael Garcia	Released	
(Italy) Gianfranco Circati	Released	
(Australia) Anthony Carbone	Sorrento	
