= 2000–01 Perth Glory SC season =

Perth Glory SC
2000–01 season
- Owners: Nick Tana (75%); Paul Afkos (25%)
- Chairman: Nick Tana
- Head coach: Bernd Stange
- Stadium: Perth Oval (league); Subiaco Oval (finals)
- National Soccer League: 3rd
- Top goalscorer: Damian Mori (18)
- Highest home attendance: 16,422 (league); 31,710 (finals)
- Lowest home attendance: 10,912 (league); 31,710 (finals)
- Average home league attendance: 13,093
colours	Away colours

The 2000–2001 Perth Glory SC season was the club's fifth in the Australian National Soccer League (NSL). The club finished third on the table, losing in the elimination final to the Melbourne Knights. It was the final season in charge for head coach Bernd Stange who left the club in mid-2001.

== Background ==
The Glory entered the 2000–01 season having lost the 2000 NSL Grand Final on penalties. The "villain" of the day, James Afkos was released by the club, signed by Marconi-Fairfield. Afkos, son of minority owner and deputy chairman Paul Afkos, claimed that he had been released on board orders, rather than a coaching decision.

== Season review ==
=== Preseason ===
The Glory opened their preseason campaign with matches in Adelaide against the Blue Eagles (1–1) and Adelaide Force (2–1). Perth Glory returned to Perth for two matches at the WACA Ground against the Slovakia team preparing for the 2000 Olympic football tournament. The Glory lost the two matches, 0–1 and 1–5. On 20 September, the Glory defeated Inglewood United 3–1. Perth Glory and Sydney Olympic played two matches in the Pilbara region of Western Australia. The first match, in Newman ended in a scoreless draw, while the second, in Karratha was a 4–2 victory to the Glory. The final match of the preseason was a tightly contested 3–2 win over the Western Australia under-23 team.

=== Regular season ===
The season was opened with a replay of the 1999–2000 NSL grand final against Wollongong Wolves with the teams locked at one goal apiece at full time at WIN Stadium.

The Glory began the season with a six-match unbeaten home streak, only dropping points in a 1–1 draw with Sydney Olympic in Round 4. The streak was broken with a defeat to Marconi in Round 11 when former Glory player James Afkos returned to score his first NSL goal.

Playing against the Brisbane Strikers in Round 13, the Glory set a club record high score in a 7–2 win with Damian Mori scoring four goals in the second half.

=== Finals series ===
Perth Glory finished the regular season in third place, equal on points and goal difference with Wollongong Wolves. The Wolves took second place based on a greater number of goals scored. The Glory would have taken second place but for a decision by Soccer Australia to award the Wolves a 3–0 forfeit win over Eastern Pride after their withdrawal from the league. Had Soccer Australia followed their decision to award walkovers to opponents of Carlton after their withdrawal, Perth would have finished above the Wolves. As a result of finishing third, Perth missed out on a double chance in the finals.

In the first leg of the elimination final, Perth and Melbourne Knights drew 1–1 at Knights Stadium. The match was overshadowed by a number of incidents involving members of the crowd and the Perth Glory team and supporters. During the match, Serbian-raised Glory forward Bobby Despotovski reacted to comments from the crowd supporting the Croatian-majority Knights with a three-fingered salute, a symbol of Serbian Orthodox Christianity. Members of the crowd attacked a number of players including Despotovski, Craig Deans, Gareth Naven and Jason Petkovic as they left the stadium. Coach Bernd Stange and several supporters were also attacked. Knights management claimed that a group of skinheads associated with another, un-named, Melbourne-based Croatian team were responsible.

After a mid-week investigation, the Knights were cleared to play the second leg at Subiaco Oval in Perth. The Glory and Knights drew 2–2, with the Perth team being eliminated on the away goals rule.

=== Coaching ===
Having survived an attempt by majority owner and chairman Nick Tana to replace him during the previous season, coach Bernd Stange took charge of the Glory for his last season.

In March 2001, the club placed a poll on their website asking fans to decide whether Stange should be retained beyond the current season. When the poll was removed, it was approximately 50–50 for and against keeping Stange as coach.

After the end of the 2000–01 season, Stange left the club after the completion of his contract. He was replaced by his deputy, Mich d'Avray.

== Results ==
Legend

Win	Draw	Loss

=== Preseason ===
Date	Opponent	H/A	Score	Ref
30 August 2000	Blue Eagles	A	1–1	
2 September 2000	Adelaide Force	A	2–0	
6 September 2000	Slovakia U-23	H	0–1	
9 September 2000	Slovakia U-23	H	1–5	
20 September 2000	Inglewood United	A	3–1	
30 September 2000	Sydney Olympic	H	0–0	
2 October 2000	Sydney Olympic	H	4–2	
7 October 2000	WA Under-23	H	3–2	

=== League ===
Round	Date	Opponent	H/A	Score	Scorers	Attendance	Ref
1	14 October 2000	Wollongong Wolves	A	1–1	Mori	5,443	
2	21 October 2000	South Melbourne	H	1–0	Despotovski	14,081	
3	29 October 2000	Sydney United	A	1–2	J Harnwell	5,483	
4	4 November 2000	Sydney Olympic	H	1–1	Despotovski	12,894	
5	12 November 2000	Eastern Pride	A	3–2	Mori, Pryce, Maloney	1,846	
6	18 November 2000	Football Kingz	H	5–1	Mori (3), Maloney (2)	11,909	
7	24 November 2000	Northern Spirit	A	0–2		5,764	
8	2 December 2000	Adelaide Force	H	2–0	J Carbone	10,912	
9	10 December 2000	Newcastle United	H	4–0	Edgar Júnior, J Harnwell, Despotovski (2)	11,873	
10	–	Carlton SC	–	3–0		–	(Note: All of Carlton's matches were awarded as 3–0 walkovers after they withdrew from the competition after Round 8, including matches that were already played.)
11	23 December 2000	Marconi-Fairfield	H	0–1		13,813	
12	30 December 2000	Melbourne Knights	A	1–1	Milicevic	4,871	
13	6 January 2001	Brisbane Strikers	H	7–2	Miller, G Faria, Despotovski, Mori (4)	11,942	
14	12 January 2001	Parramatta Power	A	3–2	Mori, Wehrman, Despotovski	5,071	
15	20 January 2001	Canberra Cosmos	H	3–0	Mori, Despotovski, G Faria	13,277	
16	27 January 2001	Wollongong Wolves	H	1–1	J Harnwell	16,019	
17	4 February 2001	South Melbourne	A	1–1	J Harnwell	12,917	
18	10 February 2001	Sydney United	H	5–1	Miller, Despotovski (2), G Naven, Mori	13,278	
19	18 February 2001	Sydney Olympic	A	3–3	A Edwards, Despotovski, Mori	8,669	
20	24 February 2001	Eastern Pride	H	2–1	Despotovski, J Carbone	11,732	
21	2 March 2001	Football Kingz	A	3–3	Eaddy (og), Despotovski, J Harnwell	4,554	
22	10 March 2001	Northern Spirit	H	4–1	Mori (2), Despotovski (2)	11,991	
23	16 March 2001	Adelaide Force	A	6–4	Kovacevic (og), A Edwards, Despotovski, S Miller, Mori, J Carbone (2)	4,030	
24	23 March 2001	Newcastle United	A	0–1		5,328	
25	–	Carlton SC	–	3–0		–	
26	7 April 2001	Marconi-Fairfield	A	2–0	A Edwards, G Faria	3,348	
27	14 April 2001	Melbourne Knights	H	1–0	Despotovski	13,170	
28	20 April 2001	Brisbane Strikers	A	4–1	J Harnwell, Mori (3)	1,590	
29	25 April 2001	Parramatta Power	H	0–1		16,422	
30	29 April 2001	Canberra Cosmos	A	3–0	S Miller, Maloney, A Edwards	4,660	

=== League standings ===
Pos	Team	Pld	W	D	L	GF	GA	GD	Pts	Qualification or relegation
1	South Melbourne	30	21	6	3	70	24	+46	69	2001 National Soccer League Finals
2	Wollongong Wolves (C)	30	18	7	5	80	40	+40	61	2000–01 National Soccer League Champions
3	Perth Glory	30	18	7	5	73	33	+40	61	2001 National Soccer League Finals
4	Sydney Olympic	30	17	6	7	58	37	+21	57	2001 National Soccer League Finals
5	Marconi Fairfield	30	14	8	8	42	33	+9	50	2001 National Soccer League Finals
6	Melbourne Knights	30	14	7	9	61	46	+15	49	2001 National Soccer League Finals
7	Adelaide Force	30	12	7	11	54	54	0	43	
8	Football Kingz	30	12	7	11	52	52	0	43	
9	Parramatta Power	30	13	3	14	42	44	−2	42	
10	Sydney United	30	12	6	12	46	56	−10	42	
11	Canberra Cosmos (R)	30	11	4	15	49	55	−6	37	Disbanded at end of season
12	Brisbane Strikers	30	9	8	13	52	56	−4	35	
13	Northern Spirit	30	8	8	14	39	50	−11	32	
14	Newcastle United	30	7	9	14	37	56	−19	30	
15	Eastern Pride (R)	30	5	5	20	32	61	−29	0 (Note: Eastern Pride were stripped of all their points following a breach of regulations.)	Disbanded at end of season
16	Carlton SC (R)	30	0	0	30	0	90	−90	0 (Note: Carlton SC withdrew after eight rounds. All games against them were awarded 3–0.)	Team withdrew

Updated to match(es) played on 19 April 2001. Source: rsssf.com
Rules for classification: 1) points; 2) goal difference; 3) number of goals scored.
(C) Champions; (R) Relegated

=== Finals series ===
Round	Date	Opponent	H/A	Score	Scorers	Attendance	Ref
EF1	6 May 2001	Melbourne Knights	A	0–0		5,380	
EF2	12 May 2001	Melbourne Knights	H	2–2	Deans, Maloney	31,710	

== Squad statistics ==
No.	Name	League		Finals		Total		Ref
No.	Name	Apps	Goals	Apps	Goals	Apps	Goals	Ref
12	(Australia) Peter Buljan	8	0	0	0	8	0	
5	(Australia) Vinko Buljubasic	3	0	0	0	3	0	
19	(Australia) John Carbone	20	3	0	0	20	3	
24	(Australia) Aaron Cole	1	0	0	0	1	0	
23	(Australia) Craig Deans	11	0	2	1	13	1	
10	(Australia) Bobby Despotovski	26	17	2	0	28	17	
9	(Australia) Alistair Edwards	17	4	2	0	19	4	
17	(Australia) Gary Faria	24	3	2	0	26	3	
3	(Australia) Jamie Harnwell	27	6	0	0	27	6	
25	(Australia) Todd Harnwell	1	0	1	0	2	0	
15	(Brazil) Edgar Júnior	26	1	2	0	28	1	
8	(Australia) Brad Maloney	17	4	1	1	18	5	
4	(Australia) Ljubo Milicevic	19	1	2	0	21	1	
7	(Australia) Scott Miller	23	5	2	0	25	5	
16	(Australia) Damian Mori	26	18	2	0	28	18	
26	(Australia) Nik Mrdja	6	0	1	0	7	0	
6	(Australia) Gareth Naven	21	1	2	0	23	1	
1	(Australia) Jason Petkovic	28	0	2	0	30	0	
18	(Australia) Shane Pryce	19	1	0	0	19	1	
21	(Australia) PJ Roberts	8	0	0	0	8	0	
2	(Australia) Robert Trajkovski	14	0	0	0	14	0	
14	(Chile) Dion Valle	12	0	1	0	13	0	
11	(Australia) Kasey Wehrman	15	1	2	0	17	1	

Statistics accurate as at the end of the 2000–01 NSL season.

== Transfers ==
=== In ===
Player	From	Ref
(Australia) Damian Mori	Adelaide Force	
(Australia) Shane Pryce	Newcastle Breakers	
(Australia) PJ Roberts	Canberra Cosmos	
(Australia) Brad Maloney	Marconi-Fairfield	
(Australia) Anthony Danze	Perth SC	

=== Out ===
Player	To	Ref
(Australia) James Afkos	Marconi-Fairfield	
(Australia) Troy Halpin	Sydney Olympic	
(Serbia and Montenegro) Ivan Ergić	Juventus	
(Australia) Hamilton Thorp	Parramatta Power	
(Australia) Con Boutsianis	South Melbourne	
(Brazil) Aurélio Schwertz		
