= 2003 National Soccer League grand final =

2003 National Soccer League Grand Final
- Event: 2002–03 National Soccer League
Perth Glory	Olympic Sharks
2	0
- Date: 1 June 2003
- Venue: Subiaco Oval, Perth, Western Australia
- Man of the Match: Simon Colosimo (Joe Marston Medal)
- Referee: Mark Shield
- Attendance: 38,111

The 2003 National Soccer League Grand Final was held on 1 June 2003 between Perth Glory and Olympic Sharks at Subiaco Oval. Perth Glory had gained home-ground advantage as they topped the Championship Playoff, with Olympic Sharks finishing second. Perth won the match 2–0, with goals from Jamie Harnwell and Damian Mori sealing their first National Soccer League championship. Simon Colosimo won the Joe Marston Medal.

== Route to the Final ==
=== League Standings ===
Pos	Team	Pld	W	D	L	GF	GA	GD	Pts	Qualification or relegation
1	Olympic Sharks	24	16	3	5	51	28	+23	51	2003 National Soccer League Championship Playoff
2	Perth Glory	24	16	2	6	48	22	+26	50	2003 National Soccer League Championship Playoff
3	Parramatta Power	24	12	4	8	51	27	+24	40	2003 National Soccer League Championship Playoff
4	Newcastle United	24	10	7	7	37	25	+12	37	2003 National Soccer League Championship Playoff
5	Adelaide City	24	11	4	9	40	34	+6	37	2003 National Soccer League Championship Playoff
6	Northern Spirit	24	11	3	10	37	44	−7	36	2003 National Soccer League Championship Playoff
7	South Melbourne	24	10	5	9	36	37	−1	35	
8	Sydney United	24	7	6	11	23	31	−8	27	
9	Melbourne Knights	24	7	6	11	38	52	−14	27	
10	Brisbane Strikers	24	7	5	12	38	45	−7	26	
11	Football Kingz	24	6	6	12	26	45	−19	24	
12	Marconi Fairfield	24	6	5	13	25	42	−17	23	
13	Wollongong Wolves	24	5	8	11	25	43	−18	23	

Updated to match(es) played on 16 March 2003. Source: Soccer Australia
Rules for classification: 1) points; 2) goal difference; 3) number of goals scored.

=== Championship Playoff ===
Pos	Team	Pld	W	D	L	GF	GA	GD	Pts	Qualification or relegation
1	Perth Glory (C)	10	8	0	2	27	7	+20	27 (Note: Awarded 3 bonus points, due to regular season position.)	2002–03 National Soccer League Champions
2	Olympic Sharks	10	4	1	5	17	14	+3	19 (Note: Awarded 6 bonus points, due to regular season position.)	2003 National Soccer League Grand Final
3	Adelaide City (R)	10	5	2	3	19	14	+5	17	Joined the 2003 SASF Premier League (Note: Adelaide City was not forcibly relegated, but voluntarily left the League due to financial difficulties.)
4	Parramatta Power	10	3	4	3	16	21	−5	13	
5	Northern Spirit	9	2	2	5	7	22	−15	8 (Note: The final round match between Northern Spirit and Newcastle United was not played, as neither team could progress.)	
6	Newcastle United	9	2	1	6	9	17	−8	7	

Updated to match(es) played on 25 May 2003. Source: Soccer Australia
Rules for classification: 1) points; 2) goal difference; 3) number of goals scored.
(C) Champions; (R) Relegated

== Match ==
=== Details ===
1 June 2003
13:00 AWST

Perth Glory	2 – 0	Olympic Sharks
Harnwell 29'; Mori 87'	Reports

Subiaco Oval, Perth
Attendance: 38,111
Referee: Mark Shield

GK	1	(Australia) Jason Petkovic
MF	2	(Australia) Matt Horsley
DF	3	(Australia) Jamie Harnwell
MF	4	(Australia) Bradley Hassell		(substituted off) 60'
MF	6	(Germany) Andre Gumprecht
MF	7	(Australia) Scott Miller
FW	10	(Australia) Bobby Despotovski (c)		(substituted off) 87'
FW	16	(Australia) Damian Mori		(substituted off) 89'
DF	18	(Australia) Shane Pryce
DF	22	(Australia) Simon Colosimo
DF	23	(Australia) David Tarka	(yellow card) 40'
Substitutes:
GK	20	(Australia) Vince Matassa
FW	9	(Australia) Nik Mrdja		(substituted on) 89'
DF	12	(Australia) Mark Byrnes		(substituted on) 60'
MF	15	(Brazil) Edgar Aldrighi		(substituted on) 87'
FW	21	(Australia) Adrian Caceres
Manager:
(South Africa) Mich d'Avray
Joe Marston Medal:
Simon Colosimo (Perth Glory)

GK	1	(Australia) Clint Bolton
DF	4	(Australia) Paul Kohler		(substituted off) 80'
DF	6	(Australia) Ante Juric (c)
MF	8	(Australia) Tom Pondeljak
FW	9	(Australia) Ante Milicic
MF	10	(Australia) Troy Halpin
MF	11	(Australia) Jade North
FW	17	(Australia) Jeromy Harris		(substituted off) 76'
FW	18	(Australia) Joel Porter	(yellow card) 58'	(substituted off) 80'
DF	23	(Australia) Andrew Packer
MF	27	(Japan) Hiroyuki Ishida
Substitutes:
GK	20	(Australia) Brett Hughes
MF	7	(Australia) Wayne Srhoj		(substituted on) 80'
FW	12	(Australia) Franco Parisi		(substituted on) 80'
MF	14	(Australia) Greg Owens		(substituted on) 76'
DF	24	(Australia) Andrew Durante
Manager:
(Australia) Lee Sterrey

Assistant referees:
Fourth official:

Match rules

- 90 minutes
- 30 minutes of extra time if necessary.
- Penalty shoot-out if scores still level.
