= 2000 National Soccer League grand final =

2000 National Soccer League Grand Final
- Event: 1999–2000 National Soccer League
Perth Glory	Wollongong Wolves
3	3
- After extra time Wollongong won 7–6 on penalties
- Date: 11 June 2000
- Venue: Subiaco Oval, Perth, Western Australia
- Man of the Match: Scott Chipperfield (Joe Marston Medal)
- Referee: Eddie Lennie
- Attendance: 43,242

The 2000 National Soccer League Grand Final was held on 11 June 2000 between Perth Glory and Wollongong Wolves at Subiaco Oval. Perth Glory had gained home-ground advantage as they were the higher ranked team from the regular season, finishing first to the Wolves's third. Perth started the match strong, going 3–0 up in the first half, however Wollongong came back with three second half goals. The scores remained level after extra time, before Wollongong won in a tense penalty shootout. Scott Chipperfield was awarded the Joe Marston Medal. It has been regarded as one of the greatest grand finals of all time.

== Route to the final ==
=== League Standings ===
Pos	Team	Pld	W	D	L	GF	GA	GD	Pts	Qualification
1	Perth Glory	34	19	7	8	60	42	+18	64	Qualification for the Finals series
2	Wollongong Wolves (C)	34	17	9	8	72	44	+28	60	Qualification for the Finals series and the Oceania Club Championship
3	Carlton	34	17	7	10	55	39	+16	58	Qualification for the Finals series
4	Adelaide Force	34	16	8	10	57	37	+20	56	Qualification for the Finals series
5	Sydney Olympic	34	16	7	11	56	40	+16	55	Qualification for the Finals series
6	Marconi Fairfield	34	16	7	11	53	49	+4	55	Qualification for the Finals series
7	Newcastle Breakers	34	14	9	11	44	44	0	51	
8	Auckland Kingz	34	15	5	14	57	59	−2	50	
9	Brisbane Strikers	34	13	10	11	46	40	+6	49	
10	South Melbourne	34	14	7	13	55	51	+4	49	
11	Parramatta Power	34	14	5	15	52	47	+5	47	
12	Melbourne Knights	34	13	6	15	44	57	−13	45	
13	Northern Spirit	34	11	3	20	41	58	−17	36	
14	Canberra Cosmos	34	9	9	16	44	64	−20	36	
15	Gippsland Falcons	34	7	8	19	23	49	−26	29	
16	Sydney United	34	5	5	24	19	58	−39	20	

Source: rsssf.com
Rules for classification: 1) points; 2) goal difference; 3) number of goals scored.
(C) Champions

=== Finals Bracket ===
Elimination Finals
6	Marconi Fairfield	0	0	0
3	Carlton SC	1	2	3
5	Sydney Olympic	4	2	6
4	Adelaide Force	1	1	2

Major/Minor Semifinals
21 May & 27 May 2000
2	Wollongong Wolves	1	0	1
1	Perth Glory	2	0	2
28 May 2000
3	Carlton	2
5	Sydney Olympic	1

Preliminary Final
4 June 2000
2	Wollongong Wolves	2
3	Carlton	1

Grand Final
Perth Glory	3 (6)
Wollongong Wolves (p)	3 (7)

== Match ==
=== Details ===
11 June 2000
13:30 AWST

Perth Glory	3 – 3 (a.s.d.e.t.)	Wollongong Wolves
Despotovski 20'; Milicevic 33'; Harnwell 42'	Reports	Chipperfield 56'; Horsley 69'; Reid 89'
Penalties
Trajkovski (penalty scored); Harnwell (penalty scored); Schwertz (penalty scored); Naven (penalty scored); Wehrman (penalty scored); Edgar Aldrighi (penalty missed); Edwards (penalty missed); Milicevic (penalty scored); Afkos (penalty missed)	6 – 7	(penalty scored) Young; (penalty scored) Robertson; (penalty scored) Ceccoli; (penalty scored) Pogliacomi; (penalty scored) Petrovski; (penalty missed) Horsley; (penalty missed) Mennillo; (penalty scored) Chipperfield; (penalty scored) Reid

Subiaco Oval, Perth
Attendance: 43,242
Referee: Eddie Lennie

GK	23	(Australia) Jason Petkovic
DF	2	(Australia) Rob Trajkovski
DF	3	(Australia) Jamie Harnwell
MF	7	(Australia) Scott Miller		(substituted off) 63'
MF	8	(Australia) Troy Halpin
FW	9	(Australia) Alistair Edwards (c)
FW	10	(Australia) Bobby Despotovski		(substituted off) 68'
MF	11	(Australia) Kasey Wehrman
MF	15	(Brazil) Edgar Aldrighi
MF	21	(Federal Republic of Yugoslavia) Ivan Ergić		(substituted off) 84'
DF	22	(Australia) Ljubo Miličević	(yellow card) 16'
Substitutes:
GK	20	(Australia) Tony Franken
FW	4	(Australia) Aurelio Schwertz	(yellow card) 75'	(substituted on) 68'
DF	6	(England) Gareth Naven		(substituted on) 84'
MF	13	(Australia) James Afkos		(substituted on) 63'
DF	14	(Chile) Dion Valle
Manager:
(Germany) Bernd Stange
Joe Marston Medal
Scott Chipperfield (Wollongong Wolves)

GK	1	(Australia) Les Pogliacomi
DF	3	(Australia) Alvin Ceccoli
DF	4	(Australia) Robert Stanton	(yellow card) 82'
DF	5	(Australia) David Cervinski		(substituted off) 46'
MF	6	(Australia) Matt Horsley (c)
MF	7	(Australia) Paul Reid
FW	10	(England) Stuart Young
DF	11	(Australia) Scott Chipperfield	(yellow card) 90'
MF	13	(Australia) Noel Spencer		(substituted off) 46'
FW	17	(Fiji) Esala Masi		(substituted off) 66'
MF	23	(Australia) Dino Mennillo	(yellow card) 28'
Substitutes:
GK	20	(Australia) Daniel Beltrame
DF	2	(Australia) George Sounis		(substituted on) 46'
FW	14	(Australia) Sasho Petrovski		(substituted on) 66'
MF	15	(Australia) David Huxley
DF	21	(Australia) Mark Robertson	(yellow card) 106'	(substituted on) 46'
Manager:
(Australia) Nick Theodorakopoulos

Assistant referees:
Fourth official:

Match rules

- 90 minutes.
- 30 minutes of extra time if necessary.
- Penalty shoot-out if scores still level.
