= 1997–98 Perth Glory SC season =

Perth Glory SC
1997–98 season
- Owners: Nick Tana; Paul Afkos
- Coach: Gary Marocchi
- Stadium: Perth Oval
- National Soccer League: 8th
- Top goalscorer: Bobby Despotovski (8)
- Highest home attendance: 17764
- Lowest home attendance: 11260
- Average home league attendance: 14979
Home colours	Away colours

The 1997–98 Perth Glory SC season was the club's second in the Australian National Soccer League (NSL).

== Match results ==
=== Legend ===
Win	Draw	Loss

Round	Date	Opponents	Venue	Result	Scorers	Attendance	Ref.
1	4 October 1997	Carlton	A	1–2	Craig Naven	5,897	
2	12 October 1997	Adelaide City	H	1–4	Samson Siasia	17,673	
3	18 October 1997	Brisbane Strikers	A	1–0	Bobby Despotovski	4,502	
4	26 October 1997	Melbourne Knights	H	3–2	Scott Halpin, Bobby Despotovski, Samson Siasia	14,384	
5	31 October 1997	Newcastle Breakers	A	3–2	Bobby Despotovski, Paul Strudwick, Scott Miller	4,183	
6	9 November 1997	UTS Olympic	H	1–0	Samson Siasia	16,905	
7	15 November 1997	Marconi-Fairfield	A	1–0	Tony Carbone	5,628	
8	23 November 1997	Adelaide Sharks	H	2–2	Gareth Naven, Peter Anosike	17,030	
9	30 November 1997	Gippsland Falcons	A	1–2	Scott Halpin	2,008	
10	7 November 1997	South Melbourne	H	4–1	Danny Hay, Bobby Despotovski, Scott Miller, Scott Halpin	15,379	
11	14 December 1997	Wollongong City	H	0–3		15,080	
12	21 December 1997	Canberra Cosmos	H	1–1	Gareth Naven	12,174	
13	28 December 1997	Sydney United	H	0–2		17,764	
14	4 January 1998	Sydney United	A	0–0		5,532	
15	11 January 1998	Carlton	H	0–0		14,687	
16	18 January 1998	Adelaide City	A	1–0	Bobby Despotovski	4,607	
17	25 January 1998	Brisbane Strikers	H	1–3	Ernie Tapai	13,341	
18	1 February 1998	Melbourne Knights	A	2–1	Scott Halpin, Ernie Tapai	4,270	
19	22 February 1998	Newcastle Breakers	H	3–4	Vasilios Kalogeracos, Scott Halpin (2)	13,328	
20	1 March 1998	UTS Olympic	A	1–3	Bobby Despotovski	3,338	
21	8 March 1998	Gippsland Falcons	H	2–1	Vasilios Kalogeracos, Bobby Despotovski	11,260	
22	15 March 1998	Adelaide Sharks	A	0–1		2,447	
23	22 March 1998	Marconi-Fairfield	H	1–1	Vasilios Kalogeracos	15,725	
24	29 March 1998	South Melbourne	A	3–3	Vasilios Kalogeracos (3)	5,670	
25	4 April 1998	Wollongong City	A	0–1		5,150	
26	13 April 1998	Canberra Cosmos	A	2–1	Bobby Despotovski, Gavin Wilkinson	3,492	
