= 1998–99 Perth Glory SC season =

Perth Glory SC
1998–99 season
- Owners: Nick Tana; Paul Afkos
- Coach: Bernd Stange
- Stadium: Perth Oval (league); WACA Ground (playoffs)
- National Soccer League: 3rd
- Top goalscorer: Con Boutsianis, John Markovski (11)
Home colours	Away colours

The 1998–99 Perth Glory SC season was the club's third in the Australian National Soccer League (NSL) and the first where they made the finals series.

== Review and events ==
In June 1998 the club announced that former East Germany manager Bernd Stange had been appointed as coach, replacing Gary Marocchi who had been sacked in April. Mich d'Avray, a former England under-21 international was appointed as Stange's assistant coach.

The Glory opened the season with an eight-match unbeaten run, dropping points only to the Brisbane Strikers. The run was broken with a loss to Newcastle Breakers in December 1998. Despite winning only one match in December 1998 and January 1999, the club rallied to win 10 of the last eleven matches of the season to finish in third place on the table.

== Match results ==
=== Legend ===
Win	Draw	Loss

=== League ===
Round	Date	Opponent	H/A	Result	Scorers	Attendance	Ref
1	11 October 1998	Adelaide City	A	1–0	Paul Strudwick	5029	
2	18 October 1998	Northern Spirit	H	2–0	Paul Strudwick, John Markovski	17580	
3	24 October 1998	Brisbane Strikers	A	2–2	Bobby Despotovski, Con Boutsianis	6115	
4	1 October 1998	Sydney United	H	2–1	Troy Halpin, John Markovski	16738	
5	8 November 1998	Canberra Cosmos	A	5–1	Danny Hay, John Markovski (2), Vasilios Kalogeracos, Troy Halpin	13943	
6	15 November 1998	South Melbourne	H	2–1	Scott Miller, Vasilios Kalogeracos	18067	
7	22 November 1998	Gippsland Falcons	A	3–0	Scott Miller (2), Vinko Buljubasic	3218	
8	29 November 1998	Adelaide Sharks	H	2–1	John Markovski (2)	15444	
9	4 December 1998	Newcastle Breakers	A	2–3	Bobby Despotovski, John Markovski	3687	
10	13 December 1998	Marconi-Fairfield	H	2–2	Gareth Naven, Con Boutsianis	17588	
11	20 November 1998	Sydney Olympic	A	1–3	John Markovski	6898	
13	3 January 1999	Carlton	H	3–0	Con Boutsianis, Michael Garcia, John Markovski	16481	
14	10 January 1999	Melbourne Knights	A	1–1	Bobby Despotovski	3905	
15	17 January 1999	Wollongong City	H	0–1		14826	
16	24 January 1999	Adelaide City	H	1–2	Con Boutsianis	12290	
17	26 January 1999	Northern Spirit	A	0–1		17722	
18	31 January 1999	Newcastle Breakers	H	0–1		10464	
19	7 February 1999	Adelaide Sharks	A	3–1	Michael Garcia, Alistair Edwards, Con Boutsianis	2545	
20	14 February 1999	Brisbane Strikers	H	6–0	Vasilios Kalogeracos, Scott Miller, Bobby Despotovski (3), Gianfranco Circati	11190	
21	21 February 1999	Sydney United	A	4–3	Con Boutsianis (2), Alistair Edwards, Michael Garcia	4211	
22	28 February 1999	Canberra Cosmos	H	3–1	Bobby Despotovski, Alistair Edwards (2)	12072	
23	31 March 1999	South Melbourne	A	1–2	Alistair Edwards	11861	
24	14 March 1999	Gippsland Falcons	H	1–0	Alistair Edwards	12880	
25	20 March 1999	Marconi-Fairfield	A	4–3	Con Boutsianis (2), Michael Garcia, Vasilios Kalogeracos	4904	
26	28 March 1999	Sydney Olympic	H	2–2	Con Boutsianis, Troy Halpin	15041	
28	11 April 1999	Carlton	A	2–1	Con Boutsianis, Bobby Despotovski	2887	
29	18 April 1999	Melbourne Knights	H	3–1	Alistair Edwards, Bobby Despotovski, Gianfranco Circati	15482	
30	25 April 1999	Wollongong City	A	3–3	John Markovski (2), Craig Deans	3213	

=== Finals series ===
Round	Date	Opponents	Venue	Result	Scorers	Attendance	Ref
Elimination final, leg 1	2 May 1999	Adelaide City	A	0–0		4500	
Elimination final, leg 2	8 May 1999	Adelaide City	H	2–1	Jamie Harnwell, Bobby Despotovski	25000	
Minor semi final	15 May 1999	Marconi-Fairfield	H	1–0	Buddy Farah (og)	27556	
Preliminary final	23 May 1999	Sydney United	A	1–2	Con Boutsianis	7698	
