= 2001–02 National Soccer League =

Australian soccer season

NSL 2001–02
- League: National Soccer League
- Sport: Association football
- Duration: 2001–2002
- Teams: 13

NSL season
- Champions: Olympic Sharks
- Top scorer: Damian Mori (17)

National Soccer League seasons
- ← 2000–01 2002–03 →

The 2001–02 National Soccer League season, was the 26th season of the National Soccer League in Australia. Prior to the start of the season, Canberra Cosmos and Eastern Pride were removed from the competition, reducing the league to 13 teams. The league premiership was won by Perth Glory and the championship won by Olympic Sharks.

== Regular season ==
=== League table ===
Pos	Team	Pld	W	D	L	GF	GA	GD	Pts	Qualification
1	Perth Glory	24	16	7	1	52	23	+29	55	Qualification for the Finals series
2	Newcastle United	24	10	12	2	33	21	+12	42	Qualification for the Finals series
3	Olympic Sharks (C)	24	12	4	8	37	24	+13	40	Qualification for the Finals series
4	Brisbane Strikers	24	10	7	7	40	34	+6	37	Qualification for the Finals series
5	South Melbourne	24	10	6	8	30	22	+8	36	Qualification for the Finals series
6	Melbourne Knights	24	11	3	10	41	40	+1	36	Qualification for the Finals series
7	Parramatta Power	24	10	4	10	34	30	+4	34	
8	Northern Spirit	24	9	7	8	36	39	−3	34	
9	Marconi Fairfield	24	8	6	10	33	36	−3	30	
10	Wollongong Wolves	24	6	7	11	28	43	−15	25	
11	Sydney United	24	6	6	12	27	37	−10	24	
12	Adelaide Force	24	4	8	12	27	39	−12	20	
13	Football Kingz	24	3	5	16	28	58	−30	14	

Source: rsssf.com
Rules for classification: 1) Points; 2) Goal difference; 3) Goals scored
(C) Champions

== Finals series ==
=== Bracket ===
Elimination finals
6	Melbourne Knights	0	2	2
3	Olympic Sharks	0	6	6
5	South Melbourne	2	2	4
4	Brisbane Strikers	0	1	1

Semifinals
1	Perth Glory	4	0	4
2	Newcastle United	1	2	3
3	Olympic Sharks	2
5	South Melbourne	1

Preliminary final
2	Newcastle United	0
3	Olympic Sharks	1

Grand final
Perth Glory	0
Olympic Sharks	1

=== Elimination Final 1 ===
Leg	Home team	Score	Away team	Venue	Attendance	Date
1	South Melbourne	2–0	Brisbane Strikers	Bob Jane Stadium	8,450	14 April 2002
2	Brisbane Strikers	1–2	South Melbourne	Ballymore	5,391	21 April 2002

=== Elimination Final 2 ===
Leg	Home team	Score	Away team	Venue	Attendance	Date
1	Melbourne Knights	0–0	Olympic Sharks	Knights Stadium	3,421	14 April 2002
2	Olympic Sharks	6–2	Melbourne Knights	Toyota Park	5,850	21 April 2002

=== Major semi Final ===
Leg	Home team	Score	Away team	Venue	Attendance	Date
1	Perth Glory	4–1	Newcastle United	Subiaco Oval	31,963	20 April 2002
2	Newcastle United	2–0	Perth Glory	Energy Australia Stadium	17,503	26 April 2002

=== Minor semi Final ===
Home team	Score	Away team	Venue	Attendance	Date
Olympic Sharks	2–1	South Melbourne	Marconi Stadium	6,341	28 April 2002

=== Preliminary Final ===
Home team	Score	Away team	Venue	Attendance	Date
Newcastle United	0–1	Olympic Sharks	Energy Australia Stadium	17,708	5 May 2002

=== Grand Final ===
12 May 2002
13:00 AWST

Perth Glory	0 – 1	Olympic Sharks
	Reports	Miličić 48'

Subiaco Oval, Perth
Attendance: 42,735
Referee: Mark Shield

GK	1	(Australia) Jason Petkovic
MF	2	(Australia) Matt Horsley
DF	3	(Australia) Jamie Harnwell
MF	7	(Australia) Scott Miller
FW	10	(Australia) Bobby Despotovski	(c) (yellow card) 15'
MF	12	(Australia) Bradley Hassell		(substituted off) 69'
MF	15	(Brazil) Edgar Aldrighi
FW	16	(Australia) Damian Mori
MF	17	(Australia) Gary Faria		(substituted off) 69'
DF	18	(Australia) Shane Pryce
DF	23	(Australia) David Tarka
Substitutes:
GK	30	(Australia) Vince Matassa
DF	5	(Australia) Craig Deans
DF	6	(Australia) Gareth Naven
FW	9	(Australia) Alistair Edwards		(substituted on) 69'
FW	26	(Australia) Nik Mrdja		(substituted on) 69'
Manager:
(South Africa) Mich d'Avray Joe Marston Medal: Ante Milicic (Olympic Sharks)

GK	1	(Australia) Clint Bolton
DF	4	(Australia) Paul Kohler
MF	6	(Australia) Wayne Srhoj	(yellow card) 45+1'	(substituted off) 69'
DF	7	(Australia) Lindsay Wilson
MF	8	(Australia) Tom Pondeljak
MF	11	(Australia) Jade North
MF	14	(Australia) Greg Owens		(substituted off) 88'
FW	16	(Australia) Jeromy Harris		(substituted off) 81'
FW	19	(Australia) Ante Milicic
DF	23	(Australia) Andrew Packer
DF	28	(Australia) Ante Juric (c)
Substitutes:
GK	30	(Australia) Brett Hughes
DF	2	(Australia) Stephen Laybutt		(substituted on) 88'
FW	9	(Australia) Dylan Macallister		(substituted on) 69'
FW	12	(Australia) Elias Augerinos
MF	27	(Japan) Hiroyuki Ishida		(substituted on) 81'
Manager:
(Australia) Gary Phillips

Assistant referees:
Fourth official:

Match rules

- 90 minutes
- 30 minutes of extra time if necessary.
- Penalty shoot-out if scores still level.

== Individual awards ==
- Player of the Year: Fernando Rech (Brisbane Strikers)
- U-21 Player of the Year: Joseph Schirripa (Newcastle United)
- Top Scorer(s): Damian Mori (Perth Glory – 17 goals)
- Coach of the Year: Ian Crook (Newcastle United)
