= 2004 National Soccer League grand final =

2004 National Soccer League Grand Final
- Event: 2003–04 National Soccer League
Parramatta Power	Perth Glory
0	1
- (asdet)
- Date: 4 April 2004
- Venue: Parramatta Stadium, Sydney, Australia
- Joe Marston Medal: Ahmad Elrich
- Referee: Mark Shield
- Attendance: 9,630
- Weather: Wet, windy, 21.2 °C (70.2 °F)

The 2004 National Soccer League Grand Final was held on 4 April 2004 between Parramatta Power and Perth Glory at Parramatta Stadium. Parramatta Power had gained home-ground advantage by beating Perth Glory in the major semi final, while Perth earned their place with a win over Adelaide United in the preliminary final. Perth won the match 1–0, with Nik Mrdja scoring a golden goal in extra time.

== Background ==
The Australian Soccer Association (ASA) had decided that this would be the last National Soccer League season ahead of the launch of the provisionally-named Australian Premier League (APL) in 2005.

== Route to the final ==
The two teams were the clear standouts with Perth finishing the season first and Parramatta six points behind. As the top two teams, they earned the right to advance to the second week of the finals series. In the major semi-final, held over two legs at Parramatta Stadium and Perth Oval, Parramatta defeated Perth 6–2 on aggregate to advance to the grand final. Perth defeated Adelaide United in the preliminary final 5–0 at Subiaco Oval to earn the right to face the Power again. After initially suggesting that they might relinquish home-ground advantage to the Glory, the Power eventually decided to host the grand final at Parramatta.

=== League Standings ===
Pos	Team	Pld	W	D	L	GF	GA	GD	Pts	Qualification
1	Perth Glory (C)	24	18	3	3	56	22	+34	57	Qualification to Finals series
2	Parramatta Power	24	16	3	5	58	30	+28	51	Qualification to Finals series
3	Adelaide United	24	11	7	6	28	25	+3	40	Qualification to Finals series
4	Marconi Stallions	24	10	8	6	29	25	+4	38	Qualification to Finals series
5	South Melbourne	24	11	4	9	39	21	+18	37	Qualification to Finals series
6	Brisbane Strikers	24	9	5	10	28	33	−5	32	Qualification to Finals series
7	Northern Spirit	24	9	3	12	31	33	−2	30	
8	Sydney Olympic	24	7	8	9	26	31	−5	29	
9	Wollongong Wolves	24	8	5	11	34	41	−7	29	
10	Sydney United	24	7	8	9	18	25	−7	29	
11	Newcastle United	24	6	6	12	18	33	−15	24	
12	Melbourne Knights	24	6	5	13	21	41	−20	23	
13	Football Kingz	24	4	3	17	25	51	−26	15	

Source: ozfootball.net
Rules for classification: 1) Points; 2) Goal difference; 3) Goals scored;
(C) Champions

=== Finals Bracket ===
Elimination Finals
3	Adelaide United (a)	3	1	4
6	Brisbane Strikers	0	4	4
4	Marconi Stallions	0	0	0
5	South Melbourne	0	2	2

Major/Minor Semifinal
2	Parramatta Power	4	2	6
1	Perth Glory	1	0	2
3	Adelaide United (a.e.t.)	2
5	South Melbourne	1

Preliminary Final
1	Perth Glory	5
3	Adelaide United	0

Grand Final
Parramatta Power	0
Perth Glory (a.e.t.)	1

== Match ==
=== Summary ===
The match took place in heavy rain which led to a smaller than expected crowd and affected the pitch.

Perth had the first real chance on goal in the 14th minute with Damian Mori having a shot from within the six-yard box saved by Clint Bolton, the Power goalkeeper. A Peter Zorbas cross after 23 minutes was spilt by Perth goalkeeper Jason Petkovic, however Power forward Ante Milicic was unable to capitalise. A promising Glory attack was thwarted in the 29th minute with a ball in the penalty area stopping in the mud near the line.

With conditions improving in the second half, Power midfielder Ahmad Elrich put in a cross to Milicic who shot wide. Shortly after, Mori again missed from just outside the six-yard box with only the keeper between him and the goal. In the 74th minute, Power forward Sasho Petrovski shot the ball wide after doing to move past his opponent.

With regulation time expiring, the teams began extra time with the Golden goal rule in effect. Mori missed a clear chance to win the grand final five minutes into extra time after Peter Zorbas slipped while trying to clear the ball from the penalty area.

Nik Mrdja, who had been an 82nd minute substitute for striker Bobby Despotovski, ended the match eight minutes into the first period of extra time with a low shot past Power goalkeeper Bolton.

=== Details ===
4 April 2004
15:00 AEST

Parramatta Power	0 – 1 (asdet)	Perth Glory
	Reports	Mrdja 98'

Parramatta Stadium, Sydney
Attendance: 9,630
Referee: Mark Shield

Parramatta Power	Perth Glory

GK	1	(Australia) Clint Bolton
DF	3	(Australia) Alvin Ceccoli (c)
DF	4	(Australia) Simon Colosimo
DF	5	(Australia) Michael Beauchamp
FW	7	(Australia) Travis Dodd
MF	8	(Germany) Andre Gumprecht	(yellow card) 86'
FW	9	(Australia) Ante Milicic		(substituted off) 68'
DF	13	(Australia) Paul O'Grady
FW	14	(Australia) Sasho Petrovski
FW	21	(Australia) Ahmad Elrich
MF	22	(Australia) Peter Zorbas		(substituted off) 97'
Substitutes:
GK	20	(Australia) Daniel Beltrame
MF	6	(Australia) Matt Thompson		(substituted on) 97'
MF	10	(Brazil) Fernando Rech		(substituted on) 68'
MF	11	(Australia) Lucas Pantelis
DF	16	(Australia) Jacek Sobczyk
Manager:
(Australia) Nick Theodorakopoulos Joe Marston Medal: Ahmad Elrich (Parramatta Power)

GK	1	(Australia) Jason Petkovic
DF	3	(Australia) Matthew Bingley
DF	5	(Australia) Shaun Murphy (c)
FW	10	(Australia) Bobby Despotovski		(substituted off) 82'
MF	11	(Australia) Jade North
DF	12	(Australia) Mark Byrnes	(yellow card) 62'
MF	15	(Australia) Tom Pondeljak
FW	16	(Australia) Damian Mori
DF	19	(Australia) Jamie Harnwell
FW	21	(Australia) Adrian Caceres
DF	24	(Australia) Jamie Coyne		(substituted off) 95'
Substitutes:
GK	20	(Australia) Vince Matassa
MF	4	(Australia) Bradley Hassell		(substituted on) 95'
MF	6	(Australia) Wayne Srhoj
MF	8	(Australia) Anthony Danze
FW	9	(Australia) Nik Mrdja		(substituted on) 82'
Manager:
(England) Mich d'Avray

Assistant referees:
Fourth official:

Match rules

- 90 minutes
- 30 minutes of extra time if necessary.
- Penalty shoot-out if scores still level.

== Post match ==
Power midfielder Ahmad Elrich was presented the Joe Marston Medal for best player of the grand final by Joe Marston.
