= Peter Filopoulos =

Peter Filopoulos is an Australian sports administrator.

During the 1990s, Filopoulos was general manager of National Soccer League team South Melbourne between 1992 and 1999.

In 1999, Filopoulos joined Australian Football League team Hawthorn as corporate marketing manager.

Filopoulos was chief commercial officer of Swimming Australia until 2015.

He was CEO of the A-League soccer club Perth Glory from 2015 to 2018.

Filopoulos was the CEO of Football Victoria between 2018 and 2020.

In September 2020 he was appointed the Head of Marketing, Communications and Corporate Affairs at Football Australia. Filopoulos is also a director of Vicsport.
