= Perth Glory FC =

Australian professional football club

Perth Glory
- Full name: Perth Glory Football Club
- Nickname: The Glory
- Short name: PGFC
- Founded: 1 December 1995; 30 years ago
- Ground: HBF Park
- Capacity: 20,500
- Owners: Pelligra Group
- Manager: Adam Griffiths
- League: A-League Men
- 2025–26: 10th of 12
- Website: perthglory.com.au
Home colours	Away colours

Perth Glory Football Club is an Australian professional football club based in Perth, Western Australia. It competes in the country's premier men's competition, A-League Men, under licence from Australian Professional Leagues.

Founded in 1995, Perth Glory is one of three A-League clubs to survive from the now-defunct National Soccer League (NSL), playing its debut match in this competition in October 1996 for the 1996–97 season. Perth established itself as a major side within Australian soccer in the final seasons of this league, with managers Bernd Stange and Mich d'Avray leading the club to three league Premierships and two Championships from four grand final appearances within a five-season period. Since entering the A-League as one of the eight original teams in 2004, the club has won a further Premiership and appeared in two more grand finals under the management of Tony Popovic and Ian Ferguson. The club has also appeared in the AFC Champions League once and appeared in two Australia Cup finals and two A-League Pre-Season Challenge Cup finals.

The club plays its home matches at Perth Rectangular Stadium, currently known as HBF Park for sponsorship purposes, a 20,500-seat stadium on Lord Street, Perth. Perth has used this stadium as its home ground since its inception.

Perth's main supporters' group is known as the "Glory Shed Supporters Club", named after "The Shed", a terrace at the club's home ground. The club has rivalries with Wellington Phoenix, Gold Coast United, and the Melbourne Knights. The club's all-time leading goalscorer is Bobby Despotovski, with 129 goals to his name in all competitions. Jamie Harnwell holds the record for most matches played, with 256 appearances for the Glory.

== History ==
=== Background (1977–95) ===
Perth first showed interest in joining the National Soccer League (NSL) prior to its inaugural year in 1977, but a series of logistical and financial problems meant that the league was reluctant to include a Western Australian team. While the state representative side continued to perform well in national and international cup competitions, WA continued to be unrepresented in a national club league until 1994, when a group of businessmen led by Joe Claudio formed the Perth Kangaroos IFC.

The club competed in the 1994 Singapore Premier League along with the Darwin Cubs: at the time, there were visions of establishing an Asia-Pacific Super League which could become a sporting and financial empire in the east. The Kangaroos finished the league season undefeated, and easily won the Singapore league title. However, with dwindling support and resources, the experiment proved to be a financial disaster, and Perth Kangaroos IFC soon folded.

Chart of yearly table positions for Perth Glory in NSL & A-League Men

=== Early seasons (1995–98) ===
In 1995, another consortium led by Nick Tana made a bid for entry into the National Soccer League. Perth Glory was subsequently licensed to join the 1996–97 NSL season and on 1 December 1995 the club was officially launched. From a relatively unheralded start, the club would develop beyond all expectations and help commercially re-establish soccer in the mainstream sports consciousness in a State where the AFL competition playing Australian Rules Football is given media dominance. Former Australian Socceroo international, Adelaide City and Perth Kangaroos coach Gary Marocchi was appointed coach for the first two seasons and won many fans with his bold, attacking style. Perth only just missed the cut for the finals; finishing 7th and 8th in 1996–97 and 1997–98 respectively.

In the Glory's inaugural season, players such as NSL-title-winning sweeper Vinko Buljubašić, Perth-based striker Bobby Despotovski and young local star Vas Kalogeracos were brought into the team and achieved cult status. New Zealand international Gavin Wilkinson was also signed while local midfielder Gareth Naven was appointed captain. In its first match in the NSL, Perth Glory lost to Sydney Olympic 4–1, with veteran Scot Alan MacKenzie scoring the first goal for Glory and Doug Ithier winning the first Man-of-the-Match award. Large crowds and good results soon followed with an exciting win over defending champions, the Melbourne Knights, thrilling a huge crowd. Glory needed only a point in its final match of the season but were defeated by the Knights and fell just short of making the finals. Glory midfielder Paul Strudwick was sent off during the match in controversial circumstances while trouble in the crowd also marred the match.

In the 1997–98 season, despite again narrowly missing the top six and signing more high-profile players like Ernie Tapai, Danny Hay and Nigerians Samson Siasia and Peter Anosike, it was a disappointing season for the Glory.

=== Stange era (1998–2001) ===
Fan support was further consolidated in the era of Bernd Stange. The former East German national coach became a media star after replacing Gary Marocchi who was sacked. Mich d'Avray, a former England under-21 international was appointed as Stange's assistant coach.

In his first season, Stange had taken Glory to its first-ever finals series and had fallen in the preliminary final against Sydney United. With new signings John Markovski and Con Boutsianis fitting straight into the side, local player Jamie Harnwell started to develop into a key defender and made the step to replace the injured Vinko Buljubašić. Unfortunately, a horror form slump at the height of summer denied the Glory a top-two place but massive crowds still attended its two home finals at the WACA Ground against Adelaide City and Marconi Stallions.

In the following season, Glory recruited young players Ivan Ergić, Jason Petkovic and Olyroo Kasey Wehrman. The club finished first in the regular season and were crowned minor premiers for the first time, allowing them to enter the final series at the major semifinal. In the finals series, the Glory lost to Wollongong Wolves 1–0 at Brandon Park, the Wolves' home ground, in the first leg of the major semifinal. The second leg of the major semifinal was held at Subiaco Oval, rather than its regular venue Perth Oval, to accommodate an expected larger crowd. In the match, Perth Glory won 2–0 over the Wolves, 2–1 on aggregate, to qualify for the grand final. The crowd of 42,764 was an Australian record for a club soccer match. In the wake of the record crowd, the Western Australian government announced a purpose-built stadium for the Glory in central Perth. The 1999–2000 grand final is remembered as one of the most thrilling matches in NSL history. Perth again faced the Wolves and led 3–0 at half time against a miserable Wolves outfit; thinking the game was won, Stange substituted key Glory players Scott Miller, Bobby Despotovski and Ivan Ergić. Yet, the Wolves rallied superbly and Perth experienced a series of defensive blunders to be pegged back to 3–3 at full-time. Perth subsequently lost on penalties, but this defining moment galvanised the team and would be a motivating force for years to come. James Afkos, a young defender and son of Glory co-owner Paul Afkos saw his penalty saved, which gave the win to the Wolves. The Wolves side also featured players such as Scott Chipperfield, Sašo Petrovski as well as Matt Horsley and Stuart Young who would go on to play with the Glory in later years. The loss was a crushing blow to Glory but the team had done well despite problems Stange had with stars such as Vas Kalogeracos and Con Boutsianis who had both left the club. Stange had also been told midway through the season that his contract would not be renewed—but well-organised supporter protest and media pressure forced Tana to change his mind and publicly announce the U-turn before a home match against the Canberra Cosmos.

In spite of the loss, Stange was popular with the public but his time had come by the end of the 2000–01 season. Glory was too inconsistent during the season, suffering from more player disharmony involving Stange's tactics, and falling just short of a top-two spot. Glory had at times played good attacking football but proved unable to do so consistently. In the finals series, the Glory once again came up against the Melbourne Knights and drew 0–0 in Melbourne despite having Jamie Harnwell sent off. Following the match Melbourne Knights fans attacked the team and their bus as they tried to leave Sunshine Stadium. It is believed that the fans were angered by a Serbian salute made by Bobby Despotovski towards Melbourne Knights fans, a club who traditionally has a large Croatian support base. In the return leg Glory were eliminated following a 2–2 draw. The Knights had gone into an early lead with goals in slippery conditions before two late goals to the Glory but it wasn't enough with the Knights winning through the away goal rule. Despite signing high-profile recruits such as Damian Mori (who had formed a prolific partnership with Bobby Despotovski upfront) and Brad Maloney while also holding onto young star Ljubo Miličević the Glory had underachieved and Stange was sacked by Nick Tana.

=== D'Avray era and end of NSL (2001–04) ===
Despite the flair of Stange's reign, it would take the more tactical approach of Mich d'Avray to finally win the NSL Championship. While less flamboyant than his predecessor, d'Avray successfully transformed the team with a different strategy to the previous coaches. The attacking 5–3–2, which saw almost as many goals conceded as scored, was replaced with a 4–4–2. Some may argue that the team began to play a less attractive form of the game, but nobody could argue with the results. In 2001–2, the team nearly went the entire season undefeated with a side that only had former Adelaide City midfielder Brad Hassell as a major addition. After scraping through in the second leg of the major semi-final against Newcastle, Glory faced Sydney Olympic in the grand final at a sold-out Subiaco Oval. While the 2000 Final was one of the great games of domestic Australian association football, the 2002 final was a tight and tense affair with Glory hardly getting a shot on target due to the fact that they lacked any bite in the midfield and had its two strikers marked out of the game. Ante Milicic was on target for Olympic though and his goal early in the second half was enough for Olympic to win 1–0 and break the hearts of Glory fans once again.

Maloney left the club at the end of the 2002 season but his replacement proved to be a key in Glory finally getting that elusive title. German midfielder Andre Gumprecht was brought into the club thanks to Stange and made an instant impact. With the NSL disintegrating around them, Glory and Olympic were the only two semi-decent teams still left in the league to galvanise its midfield and fought it out for top spot all season. Glory missed out on the league title, finishing one point behind Olympic. In March 2003, the NSL stripped the club of three points after ruling that Gumprecht had been played before he had been registered. Glory picked up Socceroo Simon Colosimo halfway through the season and eventually won the right to host the 2003 Grand Final after coming out on top of a new, confusing and convoluted league table finals format that had dragged a poor season out. In the Grand Final Glory took the game to Olympic and following a headed goal from in the first half from Harnwell it was all over late in the match when Mori saw his shot dribble over the line in dramatic fashion. 2–0 was the result and d'Avray had delivered the Grand Final victory Glory had yearned for.

In the final NSL season in 2003–04, Glory only had Parramatta Power as a huge threat with the Western Sydney club buying up big for the season. Players like Fernando Rech, Michael Beauchamp and Ante Milicic were brought in along with Glory midfielders Gumprecht and Colosimo in what seemed to be a huge blow to the champions. In response to the plundering of its engine room d'Avray signed up Sydney Olympic title winners Tom Pondeljak, Wayne Srhoj and Jade North while also getting former Socceroo defender and West Australian Shaun Murphy back from the United Kingdom. In a season where Glory again went head to head with a team from Sydney, Parramatta beat the Glory at home 4–2 and then away 2–0 to host the final ever NSL Grand Final. Glory thrashed Adelaide United in the preliminary final and faced Parramatta at Parramatta Stadium to try and go for back to back victories. In the pouring rain, Parramatta were brought down to the level of their opponents and scrapped for every ball in a match devoid of many chances. Mori wasted two sitters before young striker Nick Mrđa nailed a shot past Clint Bolton to claim the golden goal and win the match for Glory and its second NSL title. It was around 2001 that the league showed signs of significant deterioration. A combination of central mismanagement, conflicts of interest and poor sponsorship would eventually lead to a government inquiry and the removal of the leadership of Soccer Australia. Eventually, the relaunched and renamed Football Federation Australia announced the creation of the A-League in 2005. The financial backing and business nous of chairman Nick Tana had ensured the viability and success of the club during the earlier dire times – and ensured it a place in the future of the game in Australia.

=== Decline and ownership troubles (2005–09) ===
In January 2005, former Liverpool and England star Steve McMahon was appointed as coach. The club changed its name from the Perth Glory Soccer Club to the Perth Glory Football Club with a new logo being unveiled at a season launch in February. The 2005–06 season saw a complete overhaul of the playing squad, with Simon Colosimo and former Sunderland and Leeds striker Brian Deane as key signings. Other notable signings included future young stars Nick Ward and Billy Celeski. Early results in friendlies against local opposition were not great, but Perth became the first team to defeat Sydney FC, winning 1–0 in the semi-final of the 2005 A-League Pre-Season Challenge Cup before losing in the final 0–1 to the Central Coast Mariners. Perth's woeful recruiting strategy was soon evident with the early departure of star import Brian Deane after seven games. Another McMahon recruit, Northern Ireland junior international Neil Teggart, quit the club prior to the start of the regular season. Deane was replaced by Damian Mori, a former Perth Glory striker. Originally on a three-game temporary contract, after some impressive performances Mori stayed for the rest of the season and finished with seven goals. However, the club continued to be dogged by problems which would only be later revealed to the public. Steve McMahon was subject to constant media criticism over his coaching style and was accused of nepotism by signing his son, Steve McMahon Jr, who was of questionable talent. Rumours also surfaced that players were planning to stage a revolt against the coach. On 7 December, the club reported that the parties had "amicably" chosen to go separate ways. On 9 December 2005, the club announced that assistant coach Alan Vest would move into the head coach role for the remainder of the season, with striker Damian Mori taking on a dual role as player-coach after being named as his assistant. The coach's departure was merely a symptom of deeper troubles. Poor performances saw Perth miss out on qualification for the finals for the first time since 1998. Dwindling support from chairman Nick Tana, as he looked to sell his 75 percent stake in the club, seemed to underpin a general decline in club fortunes. After the Round 20 match against Sydney FC, Alan Vest hinted that the current player group were incapable of achieving anything better and stated that "cliques" had been formed undermining club harmony. To cap off a bad season, Western QBE announced they were withdrawing as major sponsor after being associated with the club for 8 years.

On 1 May 2006, Football Federation Australia relieved owner Nick Tana of ownership and management of Perth Glory. The 2006–07 season saw a host of changes. In July 2006, Australian international Stan Lazaridis signed a two-year deal. This was quickly followed by the appointment of Ron Smith as head coach and Michelle Phillips as CEO on 26 July. Unfortunately, star youth player Nick Ward did not honour his two-year contract and defied the advice of the FFA and left for Queens Park Rangers in England. In a major bonus for the Glory, longtime partner and sponsor Western QBE Insurance gave a show of faith and signed on as the club's major sponsor in round 18, until the end of the 2007–2008 season. Western QBE had previously been sponsor of the club since 1998, but decided against resigning a deal at the start of the 2006–2007 season, leaving the Glory in a very tough situation- without any sponsor or owners. But in December 2006, signs were shown that owners had been found by the FFA, and so Western QBE were reinstated. The FFA (holders of the Perth Glory licence) announced on 23 February 2007 that the Glory was to be handed over to a triumvirate of owners: Tony Sage, Brett McKeon and John Spence. This announcement ended almost a year of uncertainty. The new Glory owners were ambitious in their plans, bringing new hope to a club that was somewhat poor, both off the field and on, in 2006–07 season.

The 2007–08 season saw the arrivals of new, promising additions to the side. The Glory signed Anthony Danze, Billy Celeski, Dino Djulbic, AIS graduate Jimmy Downey, Naum Sekulovski, former Perth Soccer Club and Young Socceroos goalkeeper Tando Velaphi, Nikita Rukavytsya, Sydney FC player Nikolai Topor-Stanley, Milton Keynes Dons winger Nick Rizzo, Croatian striker Mate Dragičević, Hayden Foxe, Mitchell Prentice and striker James Robinson. Probably the biggest coup for the Glory for the 2007–08 season was the signing of a one-year sponsorship deal with Singapore listed steel manufacturer Delong Holdings, worth A$750,000, one of the biggest in the A-League, who featured on the back of the Glory jersey. In the 2007 A-League Pre-Season Challenge Cup, the Glory surprised many by making it to its second final, despite not playing a single game in Western Australia, which they lost 1–2 against Adelaide United. The new league season started poorly for the Glory, winless after 12 rounds and attracting only four-figure attendances. As a result, Ron Smith came under increasing pressure from fans and the media to deliver results. The team struggled to score goals, with Mate Dragičević in particular becoming a figure of derision. Glory legend Bobby Despotovski publicly called for Smith to be replaced, and on 4 November, Smith was sacked as manager. David Mitchell was handed the caretakers role for the rest of the season. The bold new era of Perth Glory began the same day, when it was announced the Glory were forming a strategic alliance with English Premier League club Manchester City. A 4–1 thrashing of Newcastle in Mitchell's debut match bode well for times ahead, with Glory's first win at home in a year against Melbourne and Glory's first-ever league win over Sydney. Mitchell won four and drew two of the remaining 10 games of the 2007–08 season, with the club finishing 7th overall.

The 2008–09 season preparations began much earlier than past seasons, with Perth Glory going on a three-game tour of China in March, consisting of matches against Changchun Yatai, Guangzhou City and Guangzhou Football Club. Perth Glory also made multiple new signings, including released Eugene Dadi, Adriano Pellegrino, Adrian Trinidad, Josip Magdić, Naum Sekulovski, Brazilian international midfielder Amaral, youngster Scott Bulloch and former Glory midfielder Wayne Srhoj. Perth finished the season in 7th place, with 22 points. Glory once again started the season poor, though they did however finish the second half of the season strongly, winning 4 matches and drawing 3, securing 15 points in the last 11 rounds since November. In November, head coach Dave Mitchell signed a contract extension securing his services till the end of the 2010/11 season. Mitchell's contract extension, despite Glory's slow start, showed the new direction Glory's club was heading, of vision, but built on stable foundations. Promising signs on and off the field were shown this season and things progressed further with Tony Sage taking sole ownership of the club at season's end.

=== Back to Glory (2009–13) ===
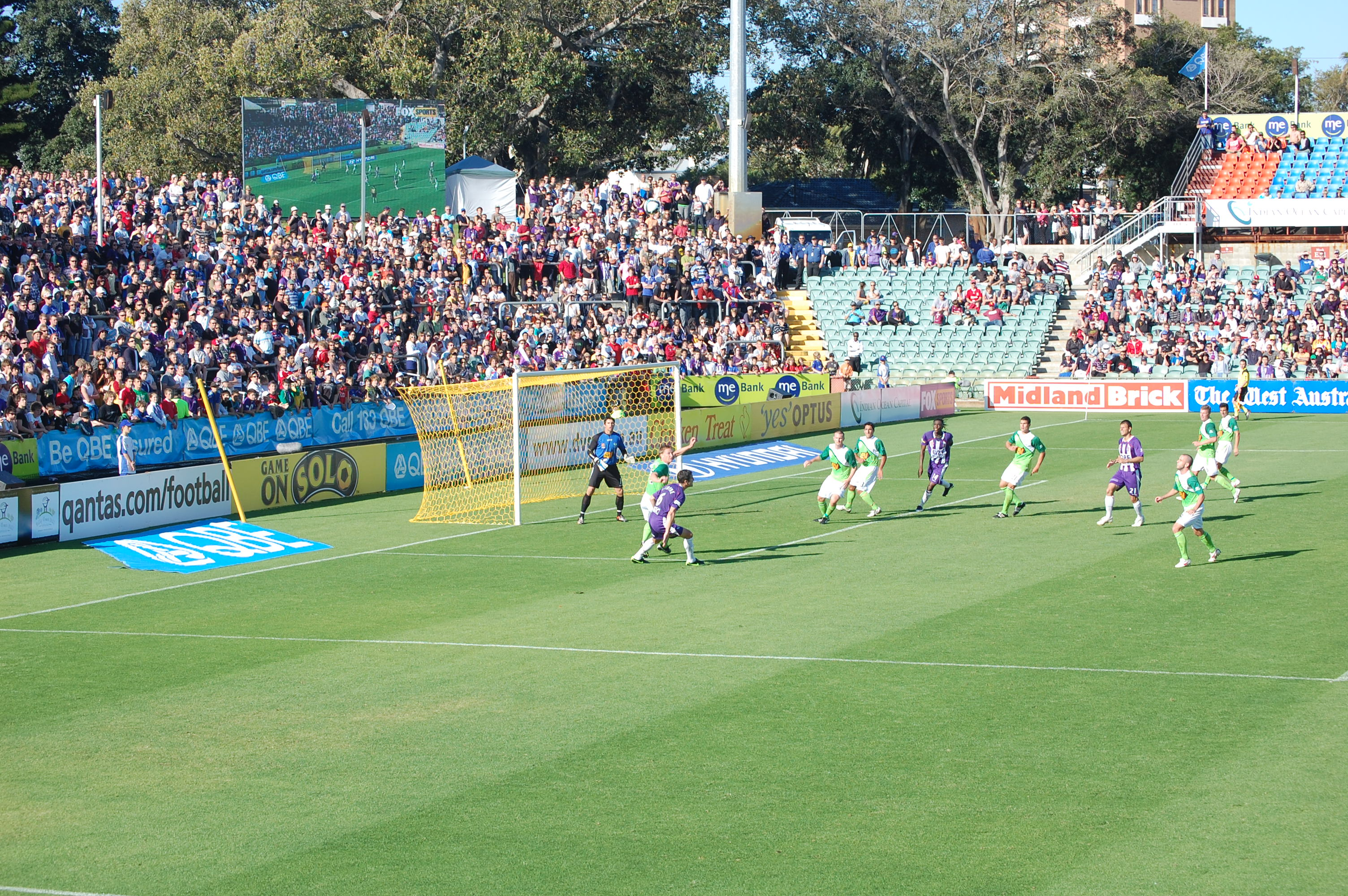
Perth vs North Queensland

Former Perth Glory co-owner Brett McKeon sold his shareholding in the club to Tony Sage in February 2009, making Sage the sole owner of the club. Following this Sage has invested money into the club for the 2009–10 season including a number of wholesale changes to operations, marketing, players and staff. As part of Glory's pre-season campaign, the club hosted English Premier League clubs Wolverhampton Wanderers FC and Fulham FC as well as new A-League franchise North Queensland Fury for friendly matches in Perth in July. Although Glory went down 1–0 and 5–0 to Wolverhampton and Fulham respectively the event was a success attracting an average of 13,000 fans to Perth Rectangular Stadium for both matches. Perth Glory continued their pre-season in Mandurah with a 1–0 victory against North Queensland Fury featuring Fury's marquee signing Robbie Fowler. For season 2009–10, Perth Glory had undertaken an overhaul of the club badge and playing kit, which includes vertical white and purple stripes on their home kit for the first time in the club's history. Tony Sage's promise to invest in the club by spending the full amount of money on players allocated under the A-League's salary cap rule had eventuated with the club making key signings. Victor Sikora was signed in February 2009 following a short term stint at Glory on loan from FC Dallas during the latter part of the 2008–09 A-League season. Further international players were added to the squad with Serbian striker Branko Jelić signed on a 3-year deal from Energie Cottbus and Englishman Andy Todd joining from Derby County. Following up on an early season promise by Tony Sage to sign Socceroo players, Perth Glory had successfully secured the services of Jacob Burns. In June 2009, in a bold move to attract attention for 2010 FIFA World Cup selection, Mile Sterjovski joined the club on a marquee contract, while Chris Coyne also announced his intentions by returning to his hometown club. Perth Glory's first match of the 2009–10 A-League season was played away at Hindmarsh Stadium against Adelaide United on 7 August 2009. This was the first season that Perth made the finals series in the A-League, finishing 5th on the ladder. The Glory were knocked out in the elimination final against Wellington Phoenix on penalties.

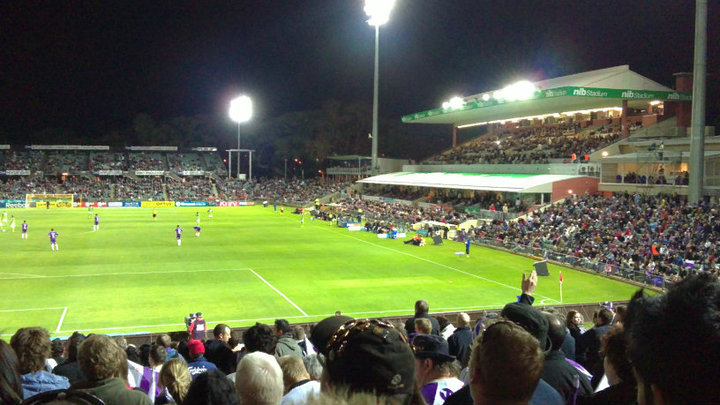
Perth vs North Queensland

At the beginning of the 2010–11 season, Perth signed ex-North Queensland Fury manager Ian Ferguson as the assistant coach, despite rumours circulating that Ferguson and new Glory signing Robbie Fowler had a bad working relationship whilst at North Queensland Fury. Glory signed veteran Jamie Harnwell to a new one-year deal for the 2010–11 season. The club also went on to sign Perth products Jamie Coyne and Todd Howarth to contract extensions, before signing left-back Josh Mitchell and striker Michael Baird, who had played together for Romanian club Universitatea Craiova. On 27 April 2010, it was announced that Fowler had agreed to become part of Glory's squad for the 2010–11 A-League season. Fowler reportedly rejected offers from Middle East clubs to stay in Australia after enjoying his time in the country. After an initial strong start to the season as equal-top after a 5-game undefeated streak, Glory lost four matches in a row, forcing David Mitchell to step down as coach, with assistant coach Ian Ferguson becoming his replacement on 12 October 2010. After the managerial change, Glory lost another 3 games, to make it 7 losses consecutively. Glory finished second last in the season, after losing their last 5 games.

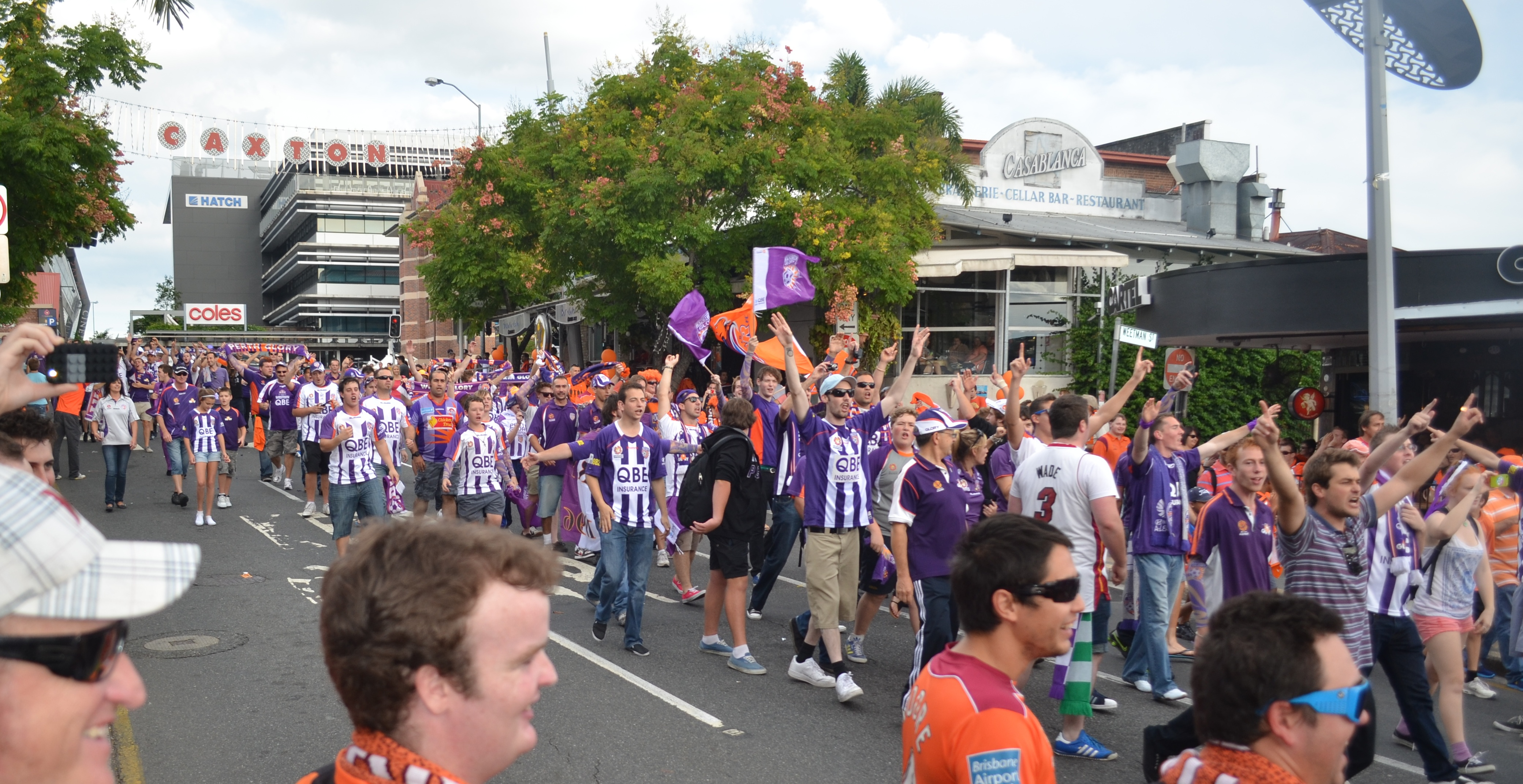
Glory fans prior to the 2012 A-League Grand Final

Perth Glory's 2011–12 season featured several high-profile signings with Ian Ferguson signing a large number of overseas and local players, including former Adelaide United player Travis Dodd, former Gold Coast United players Bas van den Brink and Shane Smeltz, Brazilian player Andrezinho, Irish international Liam Miller and former Ireland Under 21s player Billy Mehmet. Several players were let go, including Robbie Fowler and Jamie Coyne. In the pre-season, Perth played Scottish giants Celtic FC in front of 15,000 fans, with the Glory losing the friendly 0–2. Perth Glory's first match of the season was against Adelaide United at nib Stadium, which they won 1–0. They later went on to defeat Wellington Phoenix 1–0, to make it three wins in a row. Glory again slumped in form, winning one out of their last 9 matches including 7 defeats. With pressure mounting on coach Ian Ferguson, on 19 December 2011, Glory Owner Tony Sage threatened to leave the club at the end of the season. However, after apologising and dismissing his threats as an emotional outburst, Glory went out to win 9 of their last 15 and finished third on the ladder, qualifying for the finals series for the second time in their A-League history. Glory's finals series kicked off with a 3–0 victory over Melbourne Heart in a match at nib stadium. The semifinal was against their rivals Wellington at nib stadium, which the Glory won 3–2 in extra time. Perth then went to Bluetongue Stadium to play Central Coast Mariners in the preliminary final, the match the Glory won 1–1 (5–3, on penalties) to qualify for their first A-League Grand Final. Against the Brisbane Roar, in front of 50,334 people at Suncorp Stadium, Perth went up 1–0 in the 53rd minute of the match. However, Brisbane's Besart Berisha equalised in the 84th minute and eventually scored the winner in the dying seconds of the game through a controversial penalty. Jacob Burns was awarded the Joe Marston Medal for player of the match after it was accidentally awarded to Brisbane player, Thomas Broich.

For the 2012–13 season the Perth Glory owner, Tony Sage, put several players on reduced deals in order to save money. However, some players, such as Andrezinho and Scott Neville, did not accept the offers. Perth Glory also embarked on signing youth, players Chris Harold and Adrian Zahra were signed, while Brandon O'Neill and Ndumba Makeche were promoted from the youth squad. Perth Glory also won the Grand Final re-match, One goal to Nil, in Round One of the season to hand "revenge" to the Rado Vidošić led Brisbane Roar. A string of poor performance throughout the season saw Ian Ferguson sacked and replaced by former Perth Glory player, Alistair Edwards. The club would then produce a string of good performances to make the finals before being eliminated at the hands of Melbourne Victory, losing 1–2.

At the beginning of the 2013–14 season, the club decided to dedicate the number 12 shirt to the fans by not registering it to a player and having it listed as 'Glory Fans' when the squad is announced on match days. Alistair Edwards was sacked as Manager on 17 December 2013, and replaced on an interim basis by Kenny Lowe. Many fans blamed Jacob Burns for the sacking of Alistair Edwards (with rumours of him being the leader of the uprising against Edwards). The club would finish 8th in another disappointing season, with at one stage, the club was sitting at the bottom of the table.

=== Lowe era (2013–18) ===
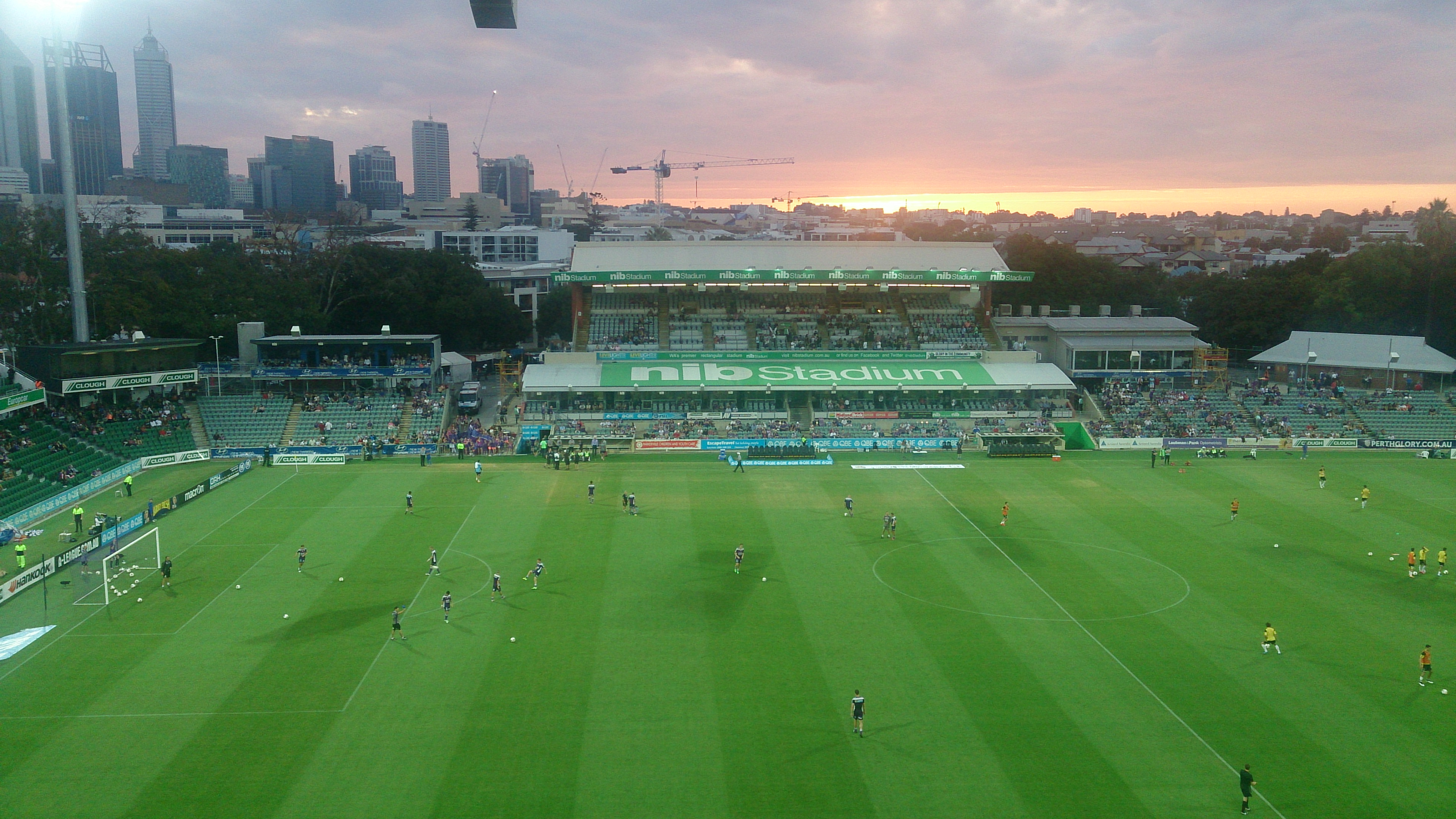
Perth Glory training prior to a home game in 2015

The 2014–15 season showed much signs of promise. Irish international Andy Keogh, Dutch international Youssouf Hersi and returning goalkeeper Danny Vukovic joined the squad in what would be Kenny Lowe's first full season as coach. Glory started the season on a high, quickly becoming league leaders and managing a run in the inaugural 2014 FFA Cup that reached the final. Although they lost the cup final 1–0 to Adelaide United, it did not diminish their efforts in the league. However, the season quickly turned sour when Fairfax Media reported Glory had gone over the salary cap. Football Federation Australia investigated the claims before finding that the club had breached the salary cap by $400,000. As a result of the salary cap violations the club received a $269,000 fine and was disqualified from the 2015 finals series (resulting compulsory 7th-place finish despite ending the season in third place). On 16 April 2015, Perth's chief executive Jason Brewer announced his resignation. He was replaced by Peter Filopoulos.

The 2015–16 season was mostly a success, with the newly signed Diego Castro winning the Johnny Warren Medal for the A-League best player. The club finished 5th, before losing 2–0 to the 3rd place Melbourne City FC away from home. In the FFA Cup the Glory again made the final, before going down 2–0 to Melbourne Victory FC.

The 2016–17 season started well with the signings of defender Rhys Williams from English club Middlesbrough and promising 19-year-old midfielder Brandon Wilson, as well as the resigning of reigning Johnny Warren Medalist Diego Castro. After an inconsistent season the club finished 5th, with Castro sharing the club Golden Boot with Andy Keogh and Adam Taggart. They again faced Melbourne City in the elimination final, with the club shock winners 2–0 away from home to set up a semi-final with the newly crowned A-League Premiers Sydney FC. Sydney took a 3–0 halftime lead which they never relinquished, the Glory falling one game short of their second A-League Grand Final.

The 2017–18 season got off to a very bad start, the club losing 1–0 in the first round of the FFA Cup to NPL Victoria club Heidelberg United, despite twin Spanish signings of Andreu Guerao and Xavi Torres, as well as Mitch Nichols and Scott Neville. After slumping to a 6–0 defeat mid-season at the hands of Sydney FC the Glory, and with mounting pressure on coach Kenny Lowe after entering into a battle for bottom spot on the ladder, the Glory signed Neil Kilkenny from Melbourne City whose arrival provided much needed strength in the midfield and coincided with a positive turnaround in form. After defeating eventual Grand Finalists Melbourne Victory FC and Newcastle Jets FC in the closing rounds, the Glory entered the final round with a win against the Brisbane Roar at home netting them the last spot in the finals. The Glory went down 2–3, slumping to 8th position on the ladder. Following a mostly unsuccessful season coach Kenny Lowe was removed as coach and CEO Peter Filopoulos resigned to move back to Victoria to take up the CEO role with Football Federation Victoria, but not before (alongside Head of Football, Jacob Burns) overseeing the appointment of new head coach, Tony Popovic. During Peter's time as CEO, membership grew by 50%, the club moved into a new training and administration HQ sharing with Western Force and the club business operations improved significantly. Kenny Lowe took up a role as technical director of the club's junior academy. In May 2018, Tony Pignata replaced Peter Filopoulos as CEO of the club. In November, it was confirmed that former player Steven McGarry would become the Technical Director within Glory's youth structure, at the same time leading the Under-18 team. Former player Richard Garcia was also confirmed as assistant coach of both the senior team and head coach of the youth team.

=== Popovic era and the return of success (2018–20) ===

Starting lineup for the Round 25 match against Newcastle Jets, the match that Perth won 1 – 0 to secure the premiership

The 2018–19 season and the start of the Tony Popovic era at the club showed many signs of promise. New players were brought into the squad including three-time A-League champion Ivan Franjic, former Socceroo Tomislav Mrcela, Western Sydney's all-time top goal scorer Brendon Santalab, Champions League winner Matthew Spiranovic, former Premier League player Jason Davidson, Socceroo Chris Ikonomidis and former La Liga player Juande. The season started with a pre-season friendly loss against Chelsea, with the match ending 0–1. Popovic's first competitive game in charge was an FFA Cup fixture in the Round of 32 against Melbourne Victory, where the Glory lost 0–1. Perth started the regular A-League season strongly not losing their opening eight fixtures, the only team to do so that season. With two games to spare, Perth Glory confirmed their place at the top of the A-League, becoming the 2018–19 Premiers with a 1–0 win over Newcastle Jets, ending a 15-year trophy drought. The regular season ended with Perth winning 18 out of 27 matches in the league and only losing three games total, with only one away from home, earning a club record of 60 points overall. This also secured them a spot in their first continental competition, the 2020 AFC Champions League. The Finals Series saw the Glory reach their second A-League Grand Final ever, after defeating Adelaide United in the semi-final in a penalty shootout (5–4), following a 3–3 draw after extra time. The Grand Final, played against 2nd-placed Sydney, was hosted in Perth for the first time in the A-League era and the fourth time overall, with a record-breaking attendance of 56,371. Despite many chances for Perth to score and a controversial goal disallowed for being offside for Sydney, the game went goalless after extra-time. The penalty shoot-out ended 4–1 in Sydney's favour.

For the 2019–20 season, new, promising players were brought into the squad. In March 2019, Perth confirmed they had signed Melbourne City FC striker Bruno Fornaroli on a two-year deal. Perth also signed other players including Brisbane Roar pair Dane Ingham and Nicholas D'Agostino, former Melbourne City defender Osama Malik, Swiss international Gregory Wüthrich and Socceroo James Meredith. Pre-season involved a friendly against Premier League giants, Manchester United which ended 2–0 to United. In the FFA Cup, Perth went down 1–2 in the round of 32 against the Western Sydney Wanderers. Following a poor start to the season, the Glory went on a ten match undefeated streak, moving into 2nd place after a draw against Brisbane Roar in round 20. In February 2020, Tony Sage confirmed that a majority of his stake in the club was set to be sold to the London Football Exchange, a football-based cryptocurrency exchange, a deal that eventually fell through due to growing speculation over the legitimacy of the sale. A drop in form occurred before the season was temporarily suspended due to the COVID-19 outbreak, as well as a 0–1 loss in the Glory's debut in the AFC Champions League against FC Tokyo. After the restart of the season, the Glory lost key players, such as Wuthrith and Castro, due to the ending of contracts and the inability of the club to meet wage demands due to the loss of revenue caused by the pandemic. The club was also in poor form and were conceding a high number of goals, eventually barely qualifying for the Finals series, finishing in 6th place. The Finals series saw the Glory win 1–0 against the 3rd placed Wellington Phoenix in the elimination final. The Glory's ambition of going one further from the previous season ended after losing 0–2 against the premiers and eventual champions, Sydney FC, in the semi-final. A few days after this match, the club confirmed that Tony Popovic had left the club to take up a management role in the Greek club Xanthi, ending his successful two-year tenure with the club.

=== Decline (2020–present) ===
On 18 September 2020, Richard Garcia was appointed as Perth Glory coach, signing on for 2 seasons. His first competitive games in charge was at the 2020 AFC Champions League group stage whose final stages were held in Qatar due to an initial postponement due to the COVID-19 pandemic. Here, Glory earned its first ever point in continental competition after a 3–3 draw with Shanghai Shenhua. Perth was eliminated in the group stage in its debut AFC Champions League season, after finishing 4th in its group with one point to its name. Garcia's first full season in charge was mainly a disappointment. Inconsistent performances led to the Glory missing out on finals for the first time in three seasons and finishing in 9th, its second-lowest finishing position in its history at the time.

In March 2022, Garcia was terminated as coach after a poor start to his second season in charge and replaced by former player Ruben Zadkovich in a caretaker capacity. The 2021–22 season ended with Glory finishing bottom of the league for the first time in its history. Glory also failed to qualify for the 2022 Australia Cup, having lost to Newcastle Jets in the post-season play-off. Despite only recording one win in his tenure at the time, Zadkovich was confirmed as full-time coach in June 2022. In Zadkovich's first and only season as permanent head coach, the Glory continued its run of poor results and performances, leaving Perth at the bottom of the table at the start of the 2022 World Cup break. Additionally, star striker Bruno Fornaroli was released following an alleged contract dispute, leaving the team with few recognised goal-scoring forwards. The club would eventually finish the season in 9th place, failing to qualify for the Finals series for a third-straight season. This was despite a relatively successful run of results at the club's temporary home ground, Macedonia Park, where it played most home matches this season due to renovations occurring at Perth Rectangular Stadium for the 2023 Women's World Cup.

Zadkovich departed the club at the end of the 2022–23 season. Former manager Kenny Lowe took charge of the club on an interim basis, overseeing the friendly against West Ham United and Australia Cup play-off against Macarthur in July 2023. In July 2023, Tony Sage stepped down as chairman of the club. The club was issued a breach notice & Sage was stripped of the license due to financial turmoil that included requiring loans from the central administration of the league to pay staff & player wages. On 3 August 2023, Perth Glory announced Alen Stajcic as the club's new manager. On 17 October 2023, Robert Brij was announced as the new owner of the club. However, on 13 November 2023, the sale was terminated, leaving the club without an owner to start the new season. On 16 February 2024, the Pelligra Group was named the new owner of the club. The 2023–24 season went poorly overall, with the club finishing last for the second time in three seasons. Adam Taggart won the Golden Boot, finishing the season with 20 goals scored. On 25 June 2024, after one season at the club, the club announced Stajcic's departure.

On 28 June 2024, David Zdrilic was announced as the club's new head coach, following a stint as assistant at Sydney FC. Zdrilic's first competitive game in charge was an Australia Cup play-off match against Brisbane Roar in Darwin. Perth emerged 2–4 victors, securing a spot in the competition's round of 32, with their first win in the competition since 2016. However, the 2024–25 A-League season would result in the club finishing last on the table for the third time in four seasons.

On 28 October 2025, the club announced that Zdrilic was relieved of his duties and that Adam Griffiths would take over as interim head coach. In December, after winning 3 out of 5 matches and taking the team up from 12th place to 5th place, The West Australian reported that Griffiths was to be appointed full-time coach. On 16 December, the club confirmed Griffiths as full-time coach until the end of the 2025–26 A-League season, with the option to extend.

== Name, colours and badge ==
Perth's home kit as of the 2020–21 season is mainly purple, with orange stripes on the collar and arms. The kit also consists of purple shorts with orange trimming and purple socks. The away kit consists of a white jersey with orange and purple stripes throughout, including on the collar and arms, and a large purple strip behind the BHP sponsorship in the middle of the kit. The shorts are white with orange and purple trimming and the socks are white. In what was seen as something of a tribute to Glory's past, the strip used for the 2009–10 season had vertical stripes, similar to what can be found on Glory's jersey of 1996–97. On 23 October 2011, Perth Glory wore a predominantly blue jersey in recognition of the 125-year anniversary of their major sponsor, QBE Insurance, in a match against Wellington Phoenix.

The Glory's original badge, used for the entire NSL era of the club, features sun rays that appear just above the word 'Glory', that utilises a soccer ball to represent the 'O' in the word. The word 'Perth' is also incorporated into the badge, in an arch above the soccer ball. In 2005 when the A-League was launched, the club decided a new badge was needed for the new era of Perth Glory. This badge has a similar layout to the original, retaining most of its elements, such as the soccer ball, the orange and purple colours and the sunbeams. In April 2009, a new shield badge for the club was unveiled, which features a soccer ball, sunbeams that protrude the outline of the badge and the colours of the original badge as well as a grey colour. Though completely divergent from previous designs, the new badge was received well in the general public. The change was viewed as the step to a new era of Perth Glory, attempting to appeal to fans. The club's 15th and 20th year anniversaries were celebrated with one-off logos, in the 2011–12 season and the 2016–17 season respectively.

== Sponsorship ==
Period	Kit manufacturer	Major sponsor	Supporting sponsor
1996–99	Umbro	Western QBE	Chicken Treat, Quit WA
1999–03	Kappa	Western QBE	Chicken Treat, Quit WA
2003–04	Sekem	Western QBE	Chicken Treat, Quit WA
2005–06	Reebok	Western QBE	Chicken Treat, Quit WA
2006–07	Reebok	Western QBE	Foxtel Digital
2007–08	Reebok	Western QBE	Delong Holdings, 6PR
2008–09	Reebok	QBE Insurance	Kurv. Magazine, 6PR
2009–11	Reebok	QBE Insurance	FEX Mining, 6PR
2011–12	XBlades	QBE Insurance	Hyperion Energy, Europcar
2012–13	XBlades	QBE Insurance	Stellar Securities, Clough
2013–15	Macron	QBE Insurance	LiveLighter, Clough
2015–2019	Macron	QBE Insurance	National Storage, Clough
2019–2022	Macron	BHP (Note: the Government of Western Australia were the shirt sponsors for the 2020 AFC Champions League.)	LiveLighter, Move2gether
2022–2023	Macron	Evolution Capital	TABtouch, Subway
2023–2024	Macron	La Vida Homes	Dream Car Rental, Zambrero, TABtouch
2024–2026	Macron	La Vida Homes	Dream Car Rental, Zambrero, Theme Group, DrimTel
2026–	Macron	Chicken Treat	Northside Rentals, Renewables Warehouse, Brightside Live, Theme Group, Muzz Buzz

== Stadium ==
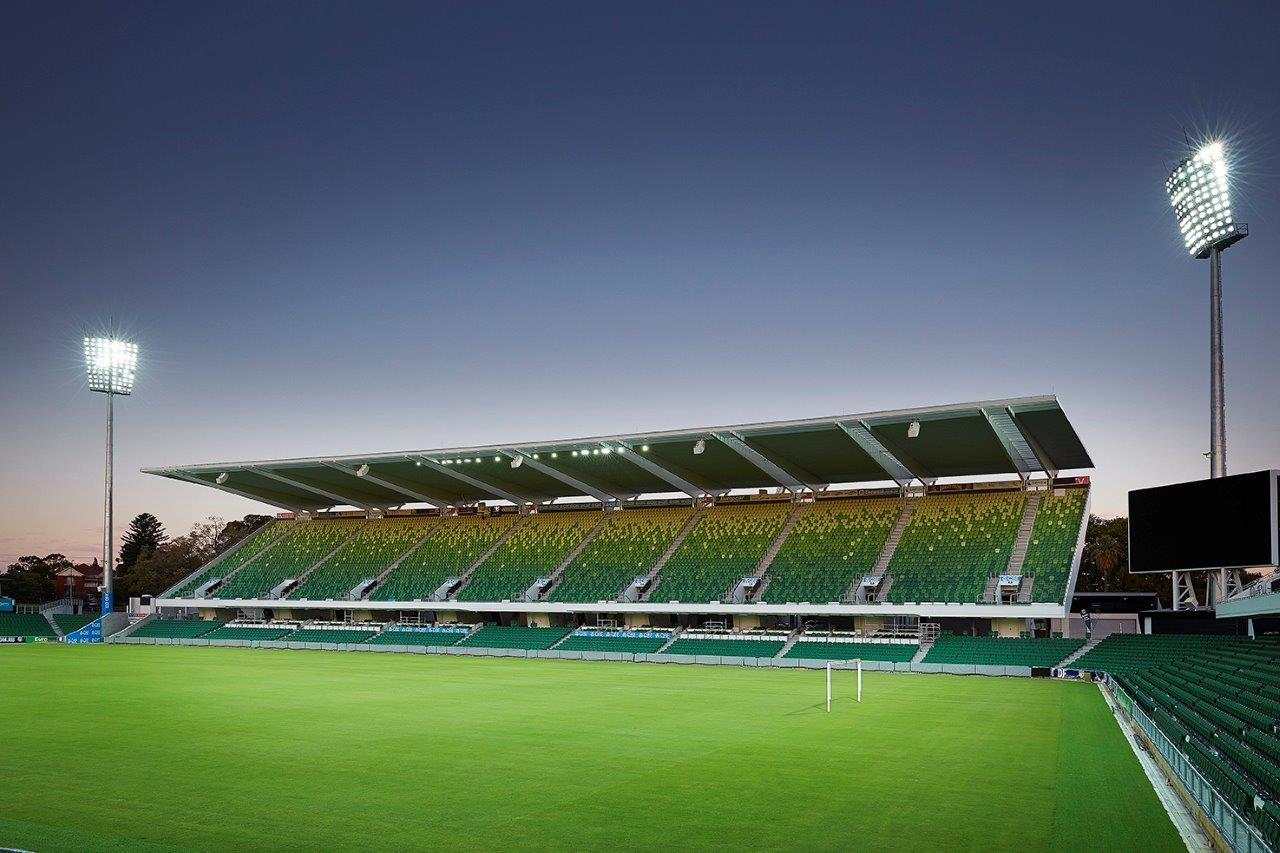
Perth Rectangular Stadium, home of Perth Glory FC

Perth Glory has played its home games at Perth Rectangular Stadium, known as HBF Park for sponsorship purposes, since their inception, a stadium that holds 20,500 spectators.

The club played its first match in the National Soccer League at the ground in October 1996. For the first several seasons of the NSL, the club ground-shared with East Perth Football Club, a local Australian rules football club. A number of proposed permanent homes for the Glory were suggested in the late 1990s. As part of Multiplex's contract to build the Perth Convention and Exhibition Centre, the construction company was required to build a rectangular stadium. The company was released from its contractual requirement after Glory chairman Nick Tana decided to proceed with a redevelopment of Leederville Oval. The Leederville Oval option was ultimately unsuccessful in the face of community opposition. In 2002, East Perth agreed to move to Leederville Oval and the state government agreed to turn Perth Oval into a dedicated rectangular venue.

The record attendance for an A-League match is 17,868 set in the semi-final against Adelaide United in the 2018–19 finals series, besting the previous record of 17,856, set when Glory hosted Melbourne Victory just a few weeks prior in round 23. The largest average season attendance in the A-League for the Glory is 10,533 in the 2016–17 season, while the largest attendance for any association football match at the ground was in November 1998 when 18,067 fans turned up to see a top-table clash with arch-rival South Melbourne.

With the arrival of the Western Force, in the Super 14 Rugby competition at the time, there was a push to have a 30,000+ capacity rectangular stadium in Perth. Western Force and Perth Glory joined forces to lobby the Western Australian Government for a ground of this size. The Force previously played games out of the 40,000-seat oval-shaped AFL ground Subiaco Oval, which hosted several Glory games before, generally NSL Finals games, most notably the 1999–2000 season NSL Grand Final when an all-time NSL record crowd of 43,242 fans saw Wollongong Wolves beat the Glory on penalties following a 3–3 draw. With the Force moving to the Perth Rectangular Stadium prior to the 2010 Super 14 season, a small increase in capacity was made to the ground, increasing capacity from around 18,000 to 20,500.

A major redevelopment occurred at Perth Rectangular Stadium starting in June 2012, with the southern and eastern stands being replaced with permanent structures. During the redevelopment, capacity was reduced during the 2012–13 A-League season. It was completed in September 2013, with a capacity of 20,441. There are plans to add a cover on the southern stand at a later stage.

In the A-League era, the club have also played various home games at Subiaco Oval, Perth Stadium (2019 A-League Grand Final), Macedonia Park (during HBF Park's redevelopment for the 2023 FIFA Women's World Cup), and Sam Kerr Football Centre (Australia Cup games). The club will also play a home game in the 2025 Australia Cup at Kingsway Reserve in Madeley.

=== Headquarters ===
In September 2021, the club moved its headquarters and training base to Fremantle Oval, south of Perth. In October 2024, it was announced that the club would move its headquarters to Stirling Leisure – Mirrabooka in 2025 on a five-year lease. Part of the adjacent Mirrabooka Regional Open Space will be used as the club's training facility following $1.2 million in facility upgrades.

== Support and rivalries ==
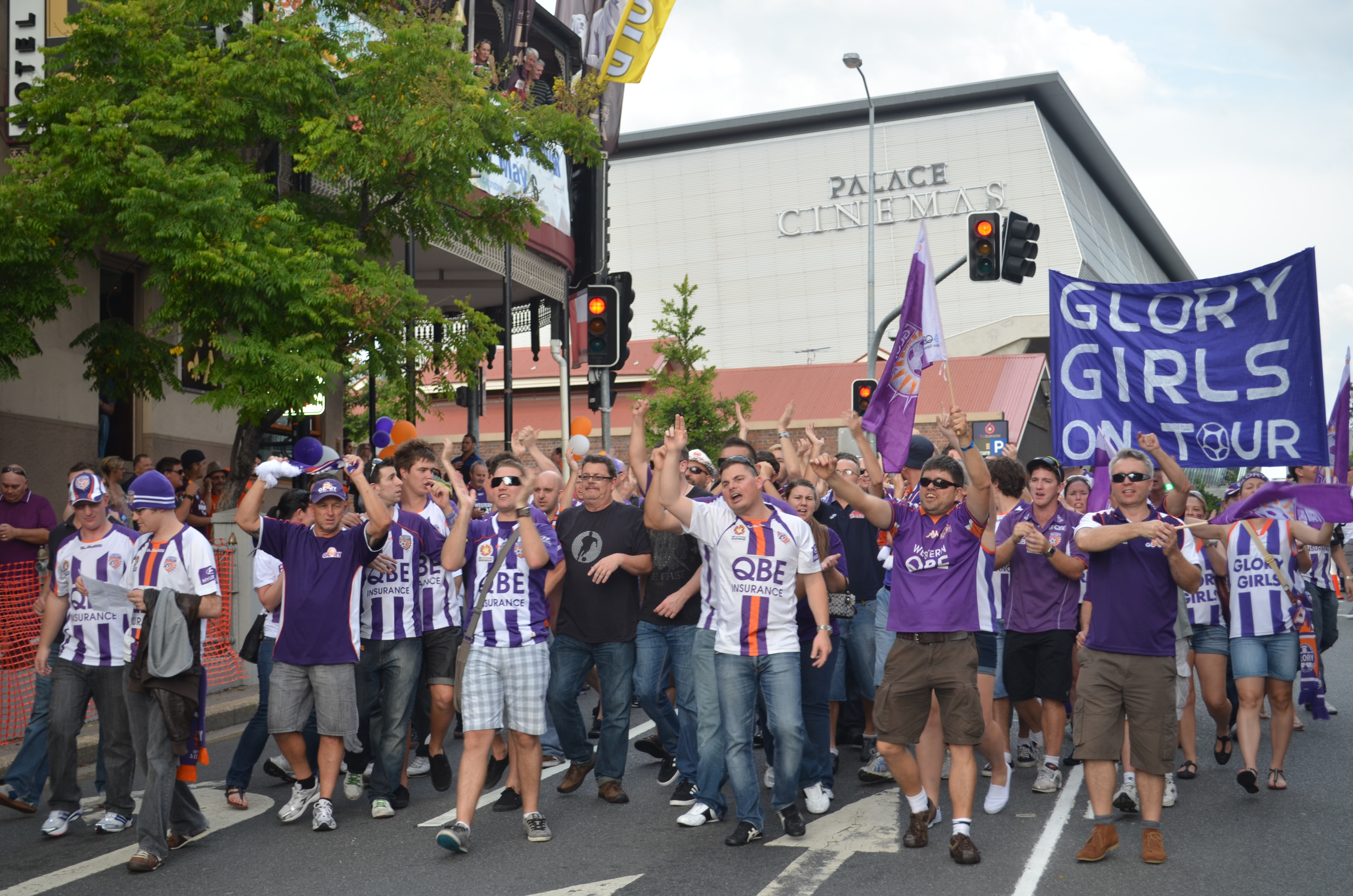
Perth Glory supporters prior to the 2012 A-League Grand Final

The main active support area in the stadium is 'The Shed', a covered terraced standing area at the northern end of the ground. The original Shed was located on the hill at the northeast of the ground and was relocated closer to the playing surface during redevelopment in 2003. The Shed is home to the supporters' group, the 'Glory Shed Supporters Club' (GSSC).

The Glory developed a rivalry against Wellington Phoenix after the side was established in 2007, titled the Distance Derby. It is based upon the two teams being considered as having one of the longest away trips in the world for a domestic league (5,255 km/3,270 mi). The two teams have had three finals games in the A-League, most recently with Perth Glory winning a finals match in the 2019–20 season. Since the 2015–16 A-League season, a trophy called the Long Distance Derby Cup has been awarded, based on the cumulative results from the 3 league games for the season.

The club also has a rivalry with former A-League side Gold Coast United, named the Iron Ore Cup. This rivalry was established due to a media-generated conflict which occurred before the two teams' met for the first time. The rivalry was named in such a way due to the owner of Perth, Tony Sage, and the owner of Gold Coast, Clive Palmer, having key involvements in the mining industry. The two sides have not played each other since Gold Coast was omitted from the league at the end of the 2011–12 A-League season.

Perth also developed a rivalry with former National Soccer League side Melbourne Knights. This rivalry started forming when the two sides competed against each other in a vital league match to qualify for finals during Glory's inaugural season, which featured crowd violence and Perth player Paul Strudwick being sent off. Glory eventually lost the game 1–3, ending their hopes of finals in their first season. In May 2001 in a finals match played in Melbourne between the two sides, Perth player Bobby Despotovski performed a Serbian salute, enraging Melbourne Knights supporters who are prominently Croatian Australian. This led to Knights fans assaulting Despotovski and Glory manager Bernd Stange prior to them boarding the Perth team bus. This prompted Glory fans to plan retaliatory attacks against Melbourne's team bus prior to the second leg of the match. The two sides have not played each other since the demise of the NSL in 2004.

== Players ==
=== First-team squad ===
As of 22 October 2026

Note: Flags indicate national team as defined under FIFA eligibility rules; some limited exceptions apply. Players may hold more than one non-FIFA nationality.

No.	Pos.	Nation	Player
1	GK	AUS	Matt Sutton
2	DF	IRQ	Charbel Shamoon
3	DF	NZL	Sam Sutton
5	DF	AUS	Lachlan Jackson
6	MF	AUS	Brandon O'Neill
7	FW	MKD	Stefan Colakovski
8	MF	IRL	Jay O'Shea
9	FW	AUS	Jaiden Kucharski
10	FW	WAL	Tom Lawrence (captain)
11	FW	AUS	Sebastian Kukucka
12	DF	AUS	Matthew Dench
13	MF	AUS	Henry Hore
16	MF	MLT	Lucas Scicluna
17	FW	AUS	Pieter Jacobsz
18	DF	AUS	Cher Deng

No.	Pos.	Nation	Player
20	MF	AUS	Trent Ostler
21	FW	NZL	Matt Ellis
23	MF	AUS	Anthony Didulica (scholarship)
24	DF	AUS	Andriano Lebib
25	MF	AUS	Sebastian Despotovski
27	MF	AUS	Will Freney
28	MF	AUS	Calem Nieuwenhof (on loan from Heart of Midlothian)
29	GK	AUS	Daniel Solsky
30	DF	AUS	Tadiwanashe Kuzamba (scholarship)
36	MF	AUS	Oliver Evans (scholarship)
39	MF	AUS	Giovanni de Abreu
40	GK	AUS	Ryan Warner
44	DF	AUS	Riley Foxe (scholarship)
45	DF	VAN	Brian Kaltak

=== Youth ===
Players to have been featured in a first-team matchday squad for Perth Glory.

Note: Flags indicate national team as defined under FIFA eligibility rules; some limited exceptions apply. Players may hold more than one non-FIFA nationality.

No.	Pos.	Nation	Player
37	FW	AUS	Louis Sollitt

=== Out on loan ===
Note: Flags indicate national team as defined under FIFA eligibility rules; some limited exceptions apply. Players may hold more than one non-FIFA nationality.

No.	Pos.	Nation	Player
—	MF	ENG	Callum Timmins (on loan at Phnom Penh Crown until 30 June 2027)

== Ownership and finances ==
In 1995, a consortium led by Nick Tana aimed to have a football team in Perth for the National Soccer League, subsequently Perth Glory were licensed to join the 1996–97 NSL season. In January 2004, Nick Tana announced he was planning to sell Perth Glory at the end of the season. On 30 April 2006, Tana and Football Federation Australia reached an agreement for FFA to take control of the club on 1 May 2006 to assume interim ownership of the club.

On 23 February 2007, Football Federation Australia announced triumvirate of local businessmen, Tony Sage, Brett McKeon and John Spence would take ownership of the club, with a commitment to make the club the powerhouse it was in the NSL. In 2008, Spence walked away from the club leaving Tony Sage and Brett McKeon as co-owners. On 18 February 2009, co-owner Brett McKeon quit the club as owner, making Tony Sage sole owner after buying out McKeon's shares. Kenny Keogh also owned a small stake in the club.

On 19 December 2011, Tony Sage threatened to leave the club, however after apologising and dismissing his threats as an emotional outburst, he re-affirmed his commitment to the club. In February 2020, Tony Sage confirmed that a majority of his stake in the club was set to be sold to the London Football Exchange, a football-based cryptocurrency exchange. This deal, however, eventually fell through due to growing speculation over its legitimacy. In July 2023, Tony Sage stepped down as chairman, with the Australian Professional Leagues (APL) being appointed as receivers of the club to manage its sale.

On 17 October 2023, the APL confirmed that Australian property developer Robert Brij would be the new owner of the club, together with John Nekic (who is to be the incoming chairman), both of Primeland Group. On 13 November 2023, it was reported that the sale to Robert Brij would be terminated just days before the formal takeover with the APL now engaging with other parties to secure a new buyer.

On 14 February 2024, Fairfax news outlets reported that Ross Pelligra, who also owns Italian club Catania FC under Pelligra Group, had agreed a deal to acquire the club although it had not yet been officially announced by the APL. The club confirmed the new ownership on 16 February 2024 with Pelligra becoming the club's chairman.

== Captaincy history ==
Dates	Name
1996–2002	(Australia) Gareth Naven
2003–2004	(Australia) Shaun Murphy
2005–2007	(Australia) Jamie Harnwell
2007–2008	(Australia) Simon Colosimo
2008–2009	(Australia) Jamie Coyne
2009–2014	(Australia) Jacob Burns
2014–2015	(Australia) Michael Thwaite
2015–2016	(Australia) Richard Garcia
2016–2017	(Australia) Rostyn Griffiths
2017–2018	(Republic of Ireland) Andy Keogh
2018–2021	(Spain) Diego Castro
2021–2022	(Australia) Brandon O'Neill
2022–2023	(Australia) Mustafa Amini
2023–2024	(England) Mark Beevers (Australia) Adam Taggart
2024–2026	(Australia) Adam Taggart
2026-Present	(Wales) Tom Lawrence

Ref:

== Club officials ==
=== Advisory Board ===
Position	Name
Chairman	Ross Pelligra
Vice Chairman	Jason Bontempo
Director	Vince Grella
Consultant	Mark Bresciano

=== Football Department ===
Position	Name
Director of Football	(Australia) Stan Lazaridis
Head coach	(Australia) Adam Griffiths
Assistant Coach	(Australia) Tomi Vidovic
Goalkeeping Coach	(Germany) Kristian Barbuscak

=== Management and Administration ===
Position	Name
Chief Executive Officer	Ben Leaver

Ref:

=== Managers ===
Name	Period	Honours	Ref(s)
(Australia) Gary Marocchi	1996–1998	—	
(Germany) Bernd Stange	1998–2001	National Soccer League Premiership: 1999–2000; National Soccer League Coach of the Year: 1999–2000	
(England) Mich d'Avray	2001–2004	National Soccer League Premiership: 2001–02, 2003–04; National Soccer League Championship: 2003, 2004; National Soccer League Coach of the Year: 2003–04	
(England) Steve McMahon	2005	—	
(New Zealand) Alan Vest	2005–2006 (a.i.)	—	
(Australia) Ron Smith	2006–2007	—	
(Australia) David Mitchell	2007–2010	—	
(Scotland) Ian Ferguson	2010–2013	—	
(Australia) Alistair Edwards	2013	—	
(England) Kenny Lowe	2013–2018	—	
(Australia) Tony Popovic	2018–2020	A-League Premiership: 2018–19; A-League Coach of the Year: 2018–19	
(Australia) Richard Garcia	2020–2022	—	
(Australia) Ruben Zadkovich	2022–2023	—	
(England) Kenny Lowe	2023 (a.i.)	—	
(Australia) Alen Stajcic	2023–2024	—	
(Australia) David Zdrillic	2024–2025	—	
(Australia) Adam Griffiths	2025–		

== Records ==
Jamie Harnwell holds the team record for the most number of games played with 269 appearances to his name. Bobby Despotovski has the second most appearances for the club, with 250 matches and Scott Miller has the third most appearances with 233 matches.

Bobby Despotovski is the all-time highest goalscorer in all competitions for the club with 116 goals. Damian Mori has scored the second most goals with 84 and Andy Keogh has scored the third most, with 64 goals to his name.

Perth Glory's highest attendance for a home league match is 18,067, recorded on 15 November 1998 against South Melbourne. The club's highest home attendance for any match is 56,371, recorded for the 2019 A-League Grand Final against Sydney FC. It is the highest attended grand final in A-League history.

== Honours ==
Perth Glory won its first piece of major silverware in the 1999–2000 season, with the premiership being won, and won their second premiership in the 2001–02 season. Despite reaching the grand final in both respective seasons, the Glory lost both, 3–3 (6–7 on penalties) against Wollongong Wolves and 0–1 against Olympic Sharks respectively. In the Glory's third grand final attempt in 2003, the club won their first Australian championship, after defeating Olympic Sharks 2–0. In the following season, the last season of the National Soccer League, Perth won their first and only double. This consisted of the winning of their third premiership and second championship, after defeating Parramatta Power through the scoring of a golden goal in extra time in the 2004 grand final.

Perth had a decline in form after the start of the A-League, failing to reach the finals series for several seasons. Despite reaching the 2012 grand final, as well as two Australia Cup finals and two A-League Pre-Season Challenge Cup finals, the Glory failed to win silverware in the A-League era until the 2018–19 season. In this season, the club won its fourth premiership, with Tony Popovic as the manager of the side, ending a 15-year silverware drought and equalling the record for the most domestic premierships won, held by the Melbourne Knights at the time. Perth also hosted a grand final for the first time since 2003 in the same season, eventually losing on penalties to Sydney.

=== Domestic ===
==== League ====
- National Soccer League Championship
  - Winners (2): 2003, 2004
  - Runners-up (2): 2000, 2002
- National Soccer League Premiership
  - Winners (3): 1999–2000, 2001–02, 2003–04
  - Runners-up (1): 2002–03
- A-League Men Championship
  - Runners-up (2): 2012, 2019
- A-League Men Premiership
  - Winners (1): 2018–19

==== Cups ====
- Australia Cup
  - Runners-up (2): 2014, 2015
- A-League Pre-Season Challenge Cup
  - Runners-up (2): 2005, 2007

=== Doubles ===
- Premiership and Championship (1): 2003–04

== Continental record ==
Season	Competition	Round	Club	Home	Away	Aggregate
2020 (Note: All of Perth Glory's matches in this edition except for the away match against FC Tokyo were played in Qatar, as they took place after the COVID-19 suspension of the competition.)	AFC Champions League	Group F	(Japan) FC Tokyo	0–1	1–0	4th
2020	AFC Champions League	Group F	(South Korea) Ulsan Hyundai	1–2	2–0	4th
2020	AFC Champions League	Group F	(China) Shanghai Shenhua	1–2	3–3	4th

== See also ==
- List of Perth Glory FC seasons
- Perth Glory FC W-League
- Perth Glory FC Youth
