= Troy Halpin =

Australian soccer player and coach

Personal information
- Full name: Troy Michael Halpin
- Date of birth: 17 August 1973 (age 53)
- Place of birth: Newcastle, Australia
- Height: 1.75 m (5 ft 9 in)
- Position: Midfielder

Youth career
- Barnsley SC
- West Wallsend FC
- Adamstown Rosebuds FC

Senior career*
Years	Team	Apps	(Gls)
1989–1991	Newcastle Austral	40	(18)
1991–1994	Newcastle Breakers	32	(10)
1994	Wollongong Wolves	4	(0)
1995–1998	Newcastle Breakers	55	(10)
1998	Stirling Lions	23	(9)
1998–2000	Perth Glory	68	(6)
2000–2004	Sydney Olympic	93	(4)
2004–2005	Johor FA	18	(4)
2005–2006	Sydney United	20	(5)
2007–2009	Toronto Awaba Stags FC	34	(9)
2010–2012	Edgeworth Eagles FC	25	(6)

International career
1993	Australia U-21	6	(1)
1998–2003	Australia	6	(1)

Managerial career
- 2007–2009: Toronto Awaba Stags FC
Medal record
Representing Australia
Men's Association football
OFC Nations Cup
Runner-up	1998 Australia
- * Club domestic league appearances and goals

Troy Michael Halpin (born 17 August 1973) is an Australian footballer and football development coach.

== Career ==
Halpin represented many NSL clubs and won the NSL championship with Sydney Olympic and Perth Glory. He also played with Newcastle United and at Perth Glory with his brother Scott Halpin. He has also played with Sydney United and Marconi in the NSW competition and wore the No 10 shirt. He was capped 6 times and scored 1 goal for the Socceroos.

== Coaching career ==
Halpin held the role of player/coach in the Northern NSW NBN State Football League with the Toronto Awaba Stags FC before moving to Edgeworth Eagles FC where he continued playing whilst also overseeing youth development for the club in the 2010 season.

== Career statistics ==
=== International ===
Appearances and goals by national team and year
National team	Year	Apps	Goals
Australia	1998	6	1
Total		6	1

Scores and results list Australia's goal tally first, score column indicates score after each Halpin goal.

List of international goals scored by Troy Halpin
No.	Date	Venue	Opponent	Score	Result	Competition
1	28 September 1998	Lang Park, Brisbane, Australia	Cook Islands	14–0	16–0	1998 OFC Nations Cup

== Honours ==
Australia

- OFC Nations Cup: runner-up 1998
