= Vasilios Kalogeracos =

Australian soccer player

Personal information
- Full name: Vasilios Kalogeracos
- Date of birth: 21 March 1975 (age 51)
- Place of birth: Perth, Western Australia, Australia
- Position: Striker

Team information
- Current team: South Melbourne SC

Youth career
- 1991–1992: Australian Institute of Sport

Senior career*
| Years | Team | Apps | (Gls) |
| 1993–1995 | Birmingham City | 0 | (0) |
| 1993–1994 | → Stevenage Borough (loan) | 4 | (1) |
| 1995–1996 | Kuala Lumpur FA | 24 | (4) |
| 1996 | Floreat Athena | | (1) |
| 1996–1997 | Perth Glory | 23 | (12) |
| 1997–1998 | Stockport County | 2 | (0) |
| 1998–2000 | Perth Glory | 36 | (10) |
| 2000–2001 | South Melbourne FC | 25 | (6) |
| 2002 | Whittlesea Stallions | 17 | (8) |
| 2003 | Heidelberg United | 22 | (6) |
| 2004 | Richmond SC | ? | (4) |
| 2005 | Kingston City | 22 | (5) |
| 2006 | Corio | 22 | (9) |
| 2007 | Fremantle Spirit | | |
| 2008 | Western Suburbs SC | 20 | (3) |

International career^{‡}
| 1991 | Australia U17 | | |
- * Club domestic league appearances and goals as of 9 August 2007 ‡ National team caps and goals as of 9 August 2007

Vasilios Kalogeracos (born 21 March 1975) is an Australian former soccer player. A prominent forward, Kalogeracos has played for Birmingham City and Stockport County in England, Waterford United in Ireland and Kuala Lumpur in Malaysia.
