= Nick Tana =

- Born: Italy

Nick Tana is the former chairman of the Australian association football club Perth Glory. He had been the chairman and the majority shareholder of Perth Glory from the club's inception in 1995 until 2006.

Tana is the former owner of fast food chains Chicken Treat and Red Rooster, as well as being the operator of a carrot farm (Sumich). He is also head of Allia Holdings who hold the operating licence for nib Stadium.

On 1 May 2006, Tana ended his ownership of the Perth Glory with the intention of working for the Football Federation Australia.
