= Dega (footballer) =

Brazilian footballer (born 1974)

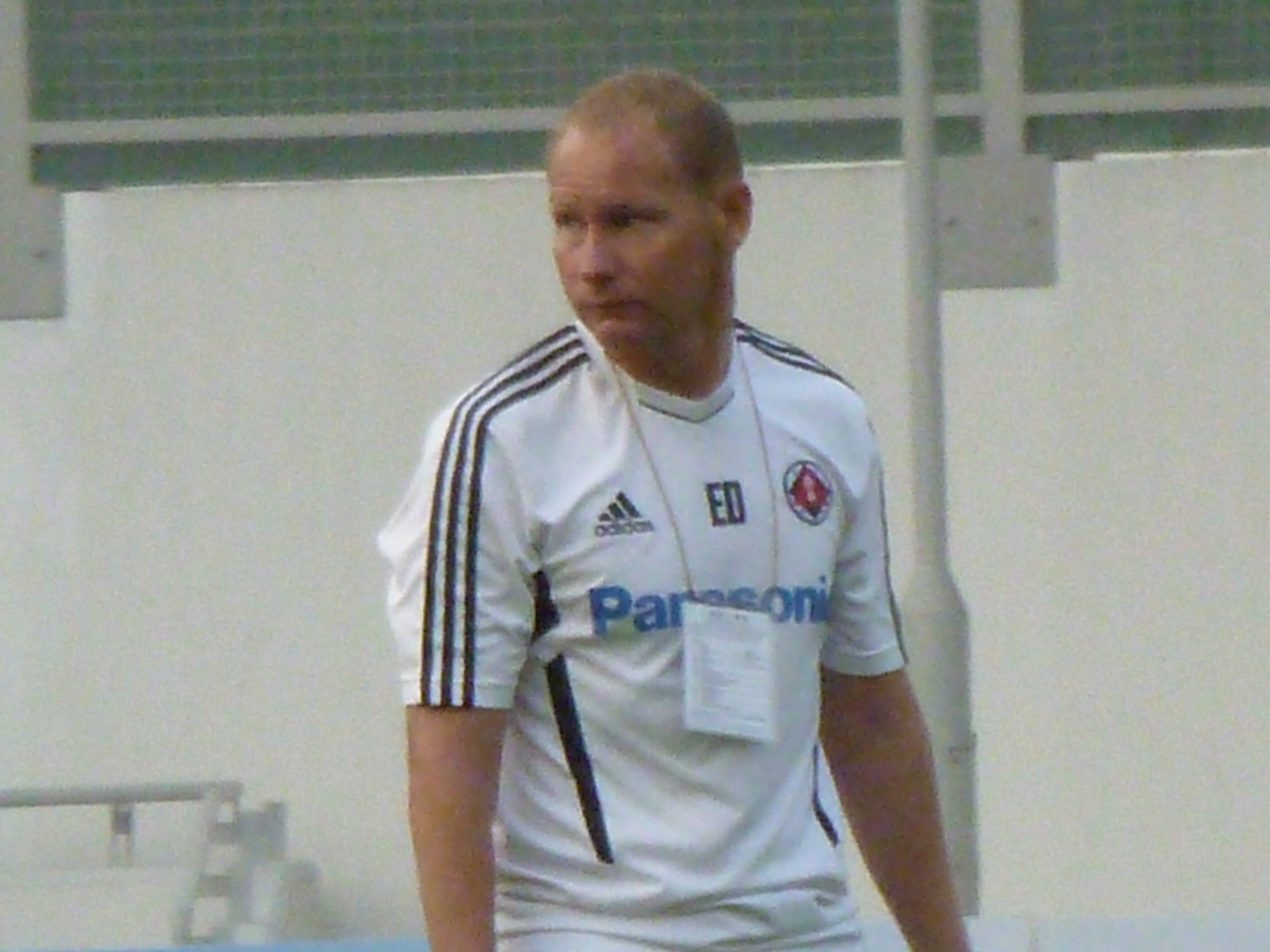
- Dega in 2012

Personal information
- Full name: Edgar Aldrighi Júnior
- Date of birth: 30 March 1974 (age 52)
- Place of birth: Pelotas, Rio Grande do Sul, Brazil
- Height: 1.76 m (5 ft 9 in)
- Position: Defensive midfielder

Youth career
- 1995: Grêmio

Senior career*
Years	Team	Apps	(Gls)
1996	Guarani		
1997	Recife		
1998	Esportiva		
1999–2003	Perth Glory	116	(2)
2003–2006	Internacional (Santa Maria)		
2006–2009	Tai Po	54	(14)
2010	Londrina		
2011	Farroupilha		
2011–2012	South China	0	(0)

International career
- Brazil U23

Managerial career
- 2011–2014: South China (assistant coach)
- * Club domestic league appearances and goals

Edgar Aldrighi Júnior (Chinese: 祖利亞 Júnior; born 30 March 1974), also known as Dega, is a Brazilian former professional footballer who played as a defensive midfielder.

== Club career ==
Dega was signed by Perth Glory in 1999 by then coach Bernd Stange. Stange's initial reaction to Edgar was that he "didn't look like a Brazilian, I was expecting a big black man," something that was said in jest.

Dega's first match for Perth Glory was against Gippsland in the first round of the 1999/2000 NSL season. Playing in a defensive midfielder role he went on to play over 30 times for the Australian side in that season and was a major reason for the Glory topping the NSL ladder at the end of the season. In the 2000 NSL Grand Final against the Wollongong Wolves (which had finished 3–3) he had the chance to score the winning penalty in the shootout against the Wolves but missed the entire goal. Wollongong went on to win the Grand Final.

The following season Dega again played a major part in the success of the club and also scored one only two of the goals he would score with the club with a 30-yard drive at a home match in front of 'The Shed'. He went on to play 28 times for the Glory in that season but the side was knocked out in the first round of the playoffs. In his third season with the club Dega played 26 matches and was part of the Glory side that dominated the domestic season again but fell in the 2002 NSL Grand Final 1–0 to the Olympic Sharks.

In his final season (the 2002/03 NSL season) with the Glory Dega was hampered by injury problems but still started 26 games and was a big help to getting Glory to their third NSL Grand Final. With the team leading comfortably 2–0 against the Olympic Sharks Dega received a standing ovation when he came on a sub in the 87th minute for Bobby Despotovski. Dega's final match for Perth Glory was finally in a winning final.

=== Tai Po ===
Dega joined Tai Po Football Club in 2006 and wore the number 31 jersey. His debut game for Tai Po Football Club is the first ever home game of the club, played in Tai Po Sports Ground, against South China. In season 2007–08, Dega changed his number to 5. He has been the first choice penalty taker since joining the team. He is always pulled down to the defence line once Joel, the first choice center defender of the team, is not playing. During the latter stage of season 2007–08, he was often deployed as a sweeper or center defender.

==== Rematch dispute ====
Dega took and scored a penalty in the 25th minutes during the league game against Eastern AA at December 2, 2007. Dega was judged by the game referee Pau Sai Yin performed interrupting movement during approaching the ball. According to the rule of FIFA, for infractions by the kicking team, should a goal be scored the kick is retaken. However, the referee awarded a free kick to Eastern AA which has violated the rule of FIFA. After the game, Tai Po Football Club made an official objection to the HKFA and the objection has been approved by the example of the rematch decision made by FIFA on 2006 Asian World Cup Qualifying game Bahrain vs Uzbekistan. In the rematch, Tai Po Football Club won by 3–1, Dega scored a penalty kick without any disputes.

Dega has been missed out from the original squad of Hong Kong League XI and only being called up after defender Cristiano Cordeiro was injured. He started both matches in Guangdong-Hong Kong Cup. With his man of the match level performance in the first match, he was praised by the fans and also the team manager, which helped him to keep the starting spot in the second round and also in 2007 Lunar New Year Cup. After these matches, Dega made his name as one of the finest defensive midfielder in the Hong Kong First Division League.

As the team first choice penalty taker, he was the team top league scorer in 2007–2008 season, and also elected as the best eleven in Hong Kong First Division League.

In season 2008–2009, Dega kept his fine form and selected as the captain Hong Kong League XI which played in 20078 Lunar New Year Cup. Unfortunately, he missed the penalty in both matches penalty time. In addition the penalty missing at game play in the league game against Tuen Mun Progoal in prior, he has failed to score three penalty consecutively. After that, Dega has not taken penalty for Tai Po, which Lee Wai Lim, So Loi Keung and later Caleb shared the responsibility.

==== Championship and departure from Tai Po ====
In the middle of the season 2008–09, Tai Po's central defender Joel has left the team. This time, coach Cheung Po Chun and Chan Ho Yin decided not to deploy Dega in the defense line as in the past, but tried some youth defenders and later played starting midfielder Lui Chi Hing as a defender instead. Since then, aged Dega has been stayed back more to secure the defense, and bagged the net much less than he was. The team's performance has dropped since the departure of Joel but later digested the loss of the player and perform well again. This was proved by the team qualified to the Hong Kong FA Cup final once again. In contrast to the 2007–08 final, which Tai Po lost in the final against Citizen, they defeated another finalist TSW Pegasus and won the 2008–09 Hong Kong FA Cup championship. In prior of the final, there were rumors which Dega will depart from the team, either joining another club in Hong Kong or went back to Brazil. Later of the time, he told the media he has been separated with the family for three years to pursuit his career in Hong Kong, he would like to go home and stay with the family so much. Since the Hong Kong FA Cup schedule has been affected by heavy rainfall and postponed a few times, he has already delayed the time he left Hong Kong for his home, which made his son very much disappointed. After the cup championship, first trophy since his career in Hong Kong with Tai Po, Dega left the team and went back to Brazil.

=== South China ===
In July 2011, he joined South China as assistant coach, but he is also registered as player for the club, He ended his playing career with The Caroliners.

== Honours ==
Perth Glory

- National Soccer League: 2002–03

Hong Kong League XI

- Guangdong-Hong Kong Cup: 2007–08
- Lunar New Year Cup: 2008
