= Parramatta Power SC =

Parramatta Power
- Full name: Parramatta Power Soccer Club
- Nicknames: Power, Parra
- Founded: 1999
- Dissolved: 2004
- Ground: Parramatta Stadium
Home colours	Away colours

Parramatta Power Soccer Club were a professional association football club who were based in the city of Parramatta (Western Sydney, New South Wales, Australia). They played in the National Soccer League from season 1999-00 until the league folded in 2004. The Power were runners up to Perth Glory in the 2003–04 season of the NSL, both on the ladder and in the grand final, after Perth took control in extra time and scored the golden goal winner in horrendous weather to become the final NSL champions.

The club was backed by the Parramatta Leagues club which also owns the Parramatta Eels rugby league team, played at Parramatta Stadium (home of the Eels) and played in gold and blue (Eels colours). The Power suffered from poor attendances throughout its existence, partly because of its links to the Eels which discouraged fans of other rugby league teams, as well as being in the already crowded Western Sydney football market.

When the A-League was established in 2004, newly-formed Sydney FC were the only team selected for the entire city (of the existing local NSL members, Northern Spirit also folded while Marconi Stallions, Sydney Olympic and Sydney United switched to the semi-professional NSW League). In 2012, Western Sydney Wanderers FC was formed as a new attempt to establish a professional team to represent the Western Sydney region, also based in Parramatta.

== National Soccer League history ==
Chart of yearly table positions for Parramatta Power in NSL

Season	Position	Played	Wins	Draws	Losses	Goals For-Against	Points	Finals
1999-00	11th of 16	34	14	5	15	52–47	47	DNQ
2000–01	9th of 15	30	13	3	14	42–44	42	DNQ
2001–02	7th of 13	24	10	4	10	34–30	34	DNQ
2002–03	3rd of 13	24	12	4	8	51–27	40	4th of 6
2003–04	2nd of 13	24	16	3	5	58–30	51	Won major semi-final vs Perth Glory; 4–2 & 2–0; Lost grand final vs Perth Glory; 1–0 AET

== Kit info ==
Years	Manufacturer	Main Sponsor	Minor Sponsor
1999–2000	ASICS	Power Credit Union	None
2000–01	ASICS	Power Credit Union	Power Ford
2001–02	Mitre	Power Credit Union	None
2002–03	Mitre	Power Credit Union	Volkswagen
2003–04	Champion	Gregory Jewellers	Volkswagen

== Performance (by club) ==
Club	Pld	Wins	Draw	Loss	GF	GA
Adelaide Force/Adelaide City Force	10	3	5	2	11	12
Adelaide United	2	1	0	1	3	2
Brisbane Strikers	10	3	1	6	15	23
Canberra Cosmos	4	1	0	3	5	7
Carlton*	4	4	0	0	11	1
Football Kingz	10	5	1	4	27	16
Gippsland Falcons/Eastern Pride	6	3	2	1	11	4
Marconi-Fairfield	10	5	2	3	18	11
Melbourne Knights	10	6	1	3	22	11
Newcastle Breakers	2	1	0	1	1	1
Newcastle United	10	5	3	2	16	12
Northern Spirit	12	6	2	4	21	13
Perth Glory	15	7	0	8	30	28
South Melbourne	10	3	2	5	10	14
Sydney Olympic/Olympic Sharks	12	6	2	4	22	15
Sydney United/Sydney United Pumas	12	9	1	2	26	8
Wollongong City/Wollongong City Wolves	10	3	1	6	14	21
Total	149	71	23	55	263	199

- Carlton S.C. folded during the 2000–01 season, 2 matches awarded 3–0 to Parramatta on forfeit.

== Honours ==
- National Soccer League Premiership
  - Runners-up (1): 2003–04
- National Soccer League Championship
  - Runners-up (1): 2004
