= Gareth Naven =

Australian former soccer player (born 1969)

Personal information
- Date of birth: 3 March 1969 (age 57)
- Place of birth: Wigan, England
- Position: Midfielder

Team information
- Current team: Bayswater City SC

Youth career
- 1985: Bayswater Inter
- 1986: AIS

Senior career*
Years	Team	Apps	(Gls)
1988–1989	Adelaide City	11	(0)
1994	Perth Kangaroos	10	(0)
1995	Sarawak FA		
1996–2002	Perth Glory	143	(6)
2003	Perth SC		

International career
1985	Australia U17		

Managerial career
- 2008–2013: Perth Glory Youth
- 2013–2014: Perth Glory (assistant)
- 2015–2016: Perth SC
- 2016–2020: Melbourne Victory Youth
- 2020–2023: Bayswater City SC
- * Club domestic league appearances and goals

Gareth Naven (born 3 March 1969) is an Australian football coach and former player. He is the development officer at Football West and coach of Bayswater City SC in the NPL.

== Playing career ==
Naven was born in 1969 in the English town of Wigan before his family moved to Perth, Western Australia.

He was a junior with Gosnells but made his initial impact with Bayswater Inter in 1985. In the same year, he and his twin brother Craig were selected in the Australia Under-16 national team that reached the quarter-finals of the World Under-16 championship in China.

In 1986 he received a scholarship to attend the Australian Institute of Sport. In 1987, Naven was a member of the Schoolboy Australia team that toured New Zealand.

While still a teenager, Naven moved to South Australia to begin his senior footballing career. He played 11 times for Adelaide City in the National Soccer League and locally for Birkalla.

He then returned to Western Australia and played with Perth Italia, winning four State league championships. He also made 20 appearances for WA and was the 1992 Gold Medal winner.

After having a spell with Malaysian side Sarawak, he captained the Perth Kangaroos team that became champions of the Singapore League in 1994. That year, he was named West Australian Player of the Year.

Naven was the inaugural captain of Perth Glory when they entered the NSL in 1996. Over the course of six years, his style of play established him as one of the club's truly iconic figures, making more than 140 NSL appearances and winning the Most Glorious Player Award in 2000.

Although Naven led the Glory to their first NSL Minor Premiership in 2000, the team suffered defeat in the 2000 NSL Grand Final to Wollongong Wolves. His next (and last) chance to become an NSL champion was as an unused substitute in their 2002 Grand Final loss to Olympic Sharks. He announced his retirement from the NSL shortly after.

Naven spent his final year as a player with a return to Perth Italia (at that point, they had changed their name to Perth Soccer Club). By the time he hung up his boots for good, Naven collected seven League medals with Perth as well as a Cup winners' medal.

In 2004, Naven received the very first Perth Glory Life Membership. He was inducted into the Football Hall of Fame in 2008, along with his brother Craig. In 2014, Naven was honoured in an NPL match between Perth SC and Perth Glory, in what was called the "Gareth Naven Cup".

== Managerial career ==
=== Perth Glory ===
After concluding his playing career, Naven moved into coaching with Perth SC and had roles at various under-age State teams (and a stint with Cockburn City as the Director of Coaching) before returning to the Perth Glory in 2008 to coach the youth team.

In February 2013, he was promoted to the senior coaching staff at Glory, as assistant to new coach and former Glory teammate, Alistair Edwards. On 17 June 2014, he was axed from Perth Glory, along with Scott Miller, after a review of the coaching structure.

=== Perth SC ===
In September 2015, Naven was appointed as head coach of Perth SC.

=== Melbourne Victory ===
On 30 May 2016, Naven was appointed as a coach for Melbourne Victory's NYL/NPL squads with Perth SC's blessing. He was at Melbourne for 3 1/2 seasons.

=== Bayswater City ===
In early 2020 Naven returned to Perth as the newly appointed Youth Development Officer with Football West. In October that same year, president Oriani Colli announced that Naven would be Chris Coyne's replacement as head coach of Bayswater City.
