= Jason Petkovic =

Australian soccer player (born 1972)

Personal information
- Date of birth: 7 December 1972 (age 53)
- Place of birth: Perth, Western Australia, Australia
- Height: 1.94 m (6 ft 4 in)
- Position: Goalkeeper

Youth career
- 1991–1993: Spearwood Dalmatinac

Senior career*
Years	Team	Apps	(Gls)
1993–1999	Adelaide City	155	(0)
1994	Darwin Cubs		
1999–2004	Perth Glory	146	(0)
2004–2005	Konyaspor	13	(0)
2005–2009	Perth Glory	31	(0)

International career
1995–2002	Australia	16	(0)
Medal record
Representing Australia
Men's Association football
OFC Nations Cup
Runner-up	1998
AFC–OFC Challenge Cup
Runner-up	2001
- * Club domestic league appearances and goals

Jason Petkovic (born 7 December 1972) is an Australian former football (soccer) player who played as a goalkeeper.

== Early life ==
Petkovic was born on 7 December 1972 in Perth, Australia. He is the brother of fellow goalkeeper Michael Petkovic.

== Club career ==
He played as a goalkeeper for the Australian A-League club Perth Glory where he has won two championships with them in 2003 and 2004. He was regarded as one of their most important players while playing for them. Petkovic has also had trials with Southampton F.C. and Norway's Rosenborg BK before joining NSL outfit Adelaide City in 1993. A broken leg sustained during a match against the Central Coast Mariners has ended his A-League 2006-07 season. However, in Round 19 of the A-League 2007-08 season he made a return to Perth against the Central Coast Mariners which ended in a 1–1 draw showing good signs of his recovery.

On 11 January 2009, he played his last professional game after announcing his retirement in the Round 19 A-League game against the Melbourne Victory which the Glory went on to win 3–2.

== A-League career statistics ==
(As of 13 November 2008)

Club	Season	League			Finals			Asia			Total		
Club	Season	Apps	Goals	CS	Apps	Goals	CS	Apps	Goals	CS	Apps	Goals	CS
Perth Glory	2005–06	20	0	3	-	-	-	-	-	-	20	0	3
Perth Glory	2006–07	4	0	2	-	-	-	-	-	-	4	0	2
Perth Glory	2007–08	3	0	0	-	-	-	-	-	-	3	0	0
Perth Glory	2008–09	4	0	1	-	-	-	-	-	-	4	0	1
Total		31	0	6	-	-	-	-	-	-	31	0	6

== Honours ==
Darwin Cubs

- Singapore Premier League Runner-up: 1994

Perth Glory

- NSL Championship: 2002–03, 2003–04

Adelaide City

- NSL Championship: 1993–94

Australia

- OFC Nations Cup: runner-up 1998
- AFC–OFC Challenge Cup: runner-up 2001
