= Scott Miller (soccer, born 1972) =

Australian soccer player and coach

Personal information
- Full name: Scott Miller
- Date of birth: 18 May 1972 (age 54)
- Place of birth: Fremantle, Western Australia
- Height: 1.80 m (5 ft 11 in)
- Position: Defender

Team information
- Current team: Fremantle City (head coach)

Senior career*
| Years | Team | Apps | (Gls) |
| 1992 | Spearwood Dalmatinac | | |
| 1993 | Perth Italia | | |
| 1993 | Sembawang Rangers | | |
| 1994 | Perth Italia | | |
| 1994 | Perth Kangaroos | | |
| 1994–1996 | Morwell Falcons | 49 | (3) |
| 1996–2006 | Perth Glory | 227 | (17) |
| 2007 | Sorrento | | |

International career
| 2001 | Australia | 2 | (0) |

Managerial career
- 2007: Cockburn City
- 2008–2009: Perth Glory Youth (Assistant)
- 2009–2013: Cockburn City
- 2013–2014: Perth Glory Youth
- 2016–2025: Cockburn City
- 2025–: Fremantle City
- * Club domestic league appearances and goals as of September 2008

Scott "Scotty" Miller (born 18 May 1972 in Perth, Western Australia) is an Australian retired football player, who is the head coach of Fremantle City FC.

== Club career ==
After a long career in the West Australian state leagues - including a stint with the short-lived Perth Kangaroos in the Singapore Premier League - Miller began his professional career in 1994 with the Morwell Falcons in the National Soccer League.

Miller was lauded as one of the best players' in the Falcons line-up as they made the 1994-95 NSL finals, and despite playing only two seasons with the Gippsland-based club, was named in the club's "Team of the NSL era" at the Falcons' 50th anniversary event in 2011.

He last played as a left full back for the Australian A-League club Perth Glory. He earned 2 caps for the Australian national team and was an inaugural player for the Perth Glory in 1996.

== Managerial career ==
=== Perth Glory ===
In July 2013, Miller re-joined Glory's coaching staff, signing on for two seasons. On 17 June 2014, he was axed from Perth Glory, along with Gareth Naven, after a review of the coaching structure.

=== Cockburn City ===
Ahead of the 2016 season, Miller returned to his head coach role at Cockburn City.
