= 2000–01 Wollongong Wolves FC season =

Wollongong Wolves
2000–01 season
- Chairman: Joe Cachia
- Manager: Ron Corry
- Stadium: WIN Stadium, Wollongong
- NSL: 2nd
- NSL Finals series: Champions
- OFC Club Championship: Champions
- FIFA Club World Championship: Cancelled
- Top goalscorer: League: Sasho Petrovski (21); All: Sasho Petrovski (34)

The 2000–01 Wollongong Wolves FC season was the club's 21st season since its establishment in 1980. The club participated in the National Soccer League for the 20th time. They were crowned runners-up in the premiership and the champions of the finals series. They were also champions for the first time of the Oceania Club Championship from their first attempt. For the period between 16 December 2000 and 2 March 2001 the club went on an unbeaten run of 18 competitive games. This included seven consecutive wins in the 2001 Oceania Club Championship and 11 league games.

== Players ==
=== Squad ===
Note: Flags indicate national team as defined under FIFA eligibility rules; some limited exceptions apply. Players may hold more than one non-FIFA nationality.

No.	Pos.	Nation	Player
1	GK	AUS	Daniel Beltrame
2	DF	AUS	George Souris
3	DF	AUS	Alvin Ceccoli
4	DF	AUS	Robbie Stanton
5	DF	AUS	David Cervinski
6	MF	AUS	Matt Horsley (captain)
7	MF	AUS	Paul Reid
8	MF	ENG	Max Nicholson
9	FW	AUS	Sasho Petrovski
10	FW	ENG	Stuart Young
11	MF	AUS	Scott Chipperfield
12	FW	AUS	Liam Austin
13	MF	AUS	George Nohra
14	FW	AUS	Jay Lucas

No.	Pos.	Nation	Player
15	DF	AUS	David Huxley
16	MF	AUS	Bevan Sullivan
17	MF	AUS	Ben Blake
20	GK	AUS	Grant Barlow
23	MF	AUS	Dino Mennillo
26	GK	AUS	Dean Anastasiadis
27	MF	AUS	Robbie Middleby
—	GK	AUS	Steve Angelov
—	DF	AUS	Paul O'Grady
—	MF	AUS	Frank Barilla
—	MF	AUS	Steven Dimitrievski
—	FW	AUS	Paul Harries
—	FW	AUS	Andrew Smith
—	FW	AUS	Sasho Dimoski

Source: WorldFootball

=== Transfers in ===
No.	Pos.	Nat.	Name	Age	Moving from	Type	Transfer window	Ends	Transfer fee	Source
8	MF	(England)	Max Nicholson	28		Transfer	Pre-season	2001	Free	
12	FW	(Australia)	Liam Austin			Transfer	Pre-season		Free	
13	MF	(Australia)	George Nohra			Transfer	Pre-season		Free	
14	FW	(Australia)	Jay Lucas			Transfer	Pre-season		Free	
20	GK	(Australia)	Grant Barlow			Transfer	Pre-season		Free	
26	GK	(Australia)	Dean Anastasiadis	30	Carlton SC (Australia)	Transfer	Pre-season		Free	
27	MF	(Australia)	Robbie Middleby	24	Carlton SC (Australia)	Transfer	Pre-season		Free	
	GK	(Australia)	Steve Angelov			Transfer	Pre-season		Free	
	MF	(Australia)	Frank Barilla			Transfer	Pre-season		Free	
	MF	(Australia)	Steven Dimitrievski			Transfer	Pre-season		Free	
	FW	(Australia)	Paul Harries			Transfer	Pre-season		Free	
	FW	(Australia)	Andrew Smith			Transfer	Pre-season		Free	

=== Transfers out ===
No.	Pos.	Nat.	Name	Age	Moving to	Type	Transfer window	Transfer fee	Source
1	GK	(Australia)	Les Pogliacomi	24	Parramatta Power	Transfer	Pre-season	Free	
8	MF	(Australia)	Anthony Surjan			End of Contract	Pre-season	Free	
12	MF	(New Zealand)	Neil Harlock	25	Free Agency	End of Contract	Pre-season	Free	
13	MF	(Australia)	Noel Spencer	22	Northern Spirit	End of Contract	Pre-season	Free	
17	MF	(Fiji)	Esala Masi	26	Free Agency	End of Contract	Pre-season	Free	
	DF	(Australia)	Paul Dimech			End of Contract	Pre-season	Free	
	DF	(Australia)	Graeme Goodfellow			End of Contract	Pre-season	Free	
	DF	(Australia)	Peter Lahanas			End of Contract	Pre-season	Free	
	MF	(Australia)	Chad Bishop			End of Contract	Pre-season	Free	

== Technical staff ==
Position	Name
Manager	(Australia) Ron Corry
Assistant Manager	

== Statistics ==
=== Squad statistics ===
N	Pos.	Nat.	Name	Total					NSL					NSL Finals
N	Pos.	Nat.	Name	Apps	Goals	Yellow card	Second yellow card	Red card	Apps	Goals	Yellow card	Second yellow card	Red card	Apps	Goals	Yellow card	Second yellow card	Red card
1	GK	(Australia)	Daniel Beltrame	6	0	0	0	0	6	0	0	0	0	0	0	0	0	0
2	DF	(Australia)	George Souris	29	0	0	0	0	25+1	0	0	0	0	3	0	0	0	0
3	DF	(Australia)	Alvin Ceccoli	24	2	1	0	0	21	2	0	0	0	3	0	1	0	0
4	DF	(Australia)	Robbie Stanton	23	5	0	0	0	8+12	5	0	0	0	1+2	0	0	0	0
5	DF	(Australia)	David Cervinski	22	0	0	0	0	15+4	0	0	0	0	2+1	0	0	0	0
6	MF	(Australia)	Matt Horsley	31	6	0	0	0	28	5	0	0	0	3	1	0	0	0
7	MF	(Australia)	Paul Reid	30	7	0	0	0	27	7	0	0	0	3	0	0	0	0
8	MF	(England)	Max Nicholson	8	0	0	0	0	0+8	0	0	0	0	0	0	0	0	0
9	FW	(Australia)	Sasho Petrovski	28	21	0	0	1	22+3	18	0	0	1	3	3	0	0	0
10	FW	(England)	Stuart Young	28	15	0	0	1	25	13	0	0	1	3	2	0	0	0
11	MF	(Australia)	Scott Chipperfield	24	17	0	0	0	21+1	17	0	0	0	2	0	0	0	0
12	MF	(Australia)	Liam Austin	0	0	0	0	0	0	0	0	0	0	0	0	0	0	0
13	MF	(Australia)	George Nohra	3	0	0	0	0	1+2	0	0	0	0	0	0	0	0	0
14	FW	(Australia)	Jay Lucas	7	0	0	0	0	0+7	0	0	0	0	0	0	0	0	0
15	DF	(Australia)	David Huxley	29	2	0	0	0	26	2	0	0	0	3	0	0	0	0
16	MF	(Australia)	Bevan Sullivan	1	0	0	0	0	1	0	0	0	0	0	0	0	0	0
17	MF	(Australia)	Ben Blake	31	1	0	0	0	28	1	0	0	0	3	0	0	0	0
20	GK	(Australia)	Grant Barlow	13	0	0	0	0	13	0	0	0	0	0	0	0	0	0
23	MF	(Australia)	Dino Mennillo	18	0	0	0	2	14+3	0	0	0	2	0+1	0	0	0	0
26	GK	(Australia)	Dean Anastasiadis	14	0	0	0	0	9+2	0	0	0	0	3	0	0	0	0
27	MF	(Australia)	Robbie Middleby	18	1	0	0	1	16+1	1	0	0	1	1	0	0	0	0
	GK	(Australia)	Steve Angelov	0	0	0	0	0	0	0	0	0	0	0	0	0	0	0
	DF	(Australia)	Paul O'Grady	5	0	0	0	0	0+5	0	0	0	0	0	0	0	0	0
	MF	(Australia)	Frank Barilla	1	0	0	0	0	0+1	0	0	0	0	0	0	0	0	0
	MF	(Australia)	Steven Dimitrievski	2	0	0	0	0	0+2	0	0	0	0	0	0	0	0	0
	FW	(Australia)	Paul Harries	6	1	0	0	0	2+4	1	0	0	0	0	0	0	0	0
	FW	(Australia)	Andrew Smith	0	0	0	0	0	0	0	0	0	0	0	0	0	0	0
	FW	(Australia)	Sasho Dimoski	0	0	0	0	0	0	0	0	0	0	0	0	0	0	0

- Last updated: 18 July 2015
- Source: worldfootball.net
- (yellow card) = Number of bookings; (second yellow card) = Number of sending offs after a second yellow card; (red card) = Number of sending offs by a direct red card.

== Competitions ==
=== Overall ===
Competition	Started round	Final position / round	First match	Last match
National Soccer League	—	2nd	14 October 2000	29 April 2001
National Soccer League Finals	Major semi-final	champions	11 May 2001	3 June 2001
Oceania Club Championship	Group stage	champions	9 January 2001	22 January 2001

=== National Soccer League ===
==== League table ====
Pos	Team	Pld	W	D	L	GF	GA	GD	Pts	Qualification
1	South Melbourne	30	21	6	3	70	24	+46	69	Qualification for the Finals series
2	Wollongong Wolves (C)	30	18	7	5	80	40	+40	61	Qualification for the Finals series
3	Perth Glory	30	18	7	5	73	33	+40	61	Qualification for the Finals series
4	Sydney Olympic	30	17	6	7	58	37	+21	57	Qualification for the Finals series
5	Marconi Fairfield	30	14	8	8	42	33	+9	50	Qualification for the Finals series
6	Melbourne Knights	30	14	7	9	61	46	+15	49	Qualification for the Finals series
7	Adelaide Force	30	12	7	11	54	54	0	43	
8	Football Kingz	30	12	7	11	52	52	0	43	
9	Parramatta Power	30	13	3	14	42	44	−2	42	
10	Sydney United	30	12	6	12	46	56	−10	42	
11	Canberra Cosmos	30	11	4	15	49	55	−6	37	
12	Brisbane Strikers	30	9	8	13	52	56	−4	35	
13	Northern Spirit	30	8	8	14	39	50	−11	32	
14	Newcastle United	30	7	9	14	37	56	−19	30	
15	Eastern Pride	30	5	5	20	32	61	−29	0 (Note: Eastern Pride were stripped of all their points following a breach of regulations.)	
16	Carlton	30	0	0	30	0	90	−90	0 (Note: Carlton withdrew after eight rounds. All games against them were awarded 3–0.)	Withdrew

Source: rsssf.com
Rules for classification: 1) Points; 2) Goal difference; 3) Goals scored
(C) Champions

==== Results summary ====
Overall								Home						Away					
Pld	W	D	L	GF	GA	GD	Pts	W	D	L	GF	GA	GD	W	D	L	GF	GA	GD
30	18	7	5	80	40	+40	61	10	3	2	46	21	+25	8	4	3	34	19	+15

Last updated: 26 April 2015.
Source: aus.worldfootball.com

==== Results by round ====
Round	1	2	3	4	5	6	7	8	9	10	11	12	13	14	15	16	17	18	19	20	21	22	23	24	25	26	27	28	29	30
Ground	H	A	H	A	H	A	H	A	A	H	A	H	H	H	A	A	H	A	H	A	H	A	H	H	A	H	A	A	A	H
Result	D	W	W	W	W	W	L	W	L	W	D	W	D	D	D	D	W	W	W	W	W	L	W	L	D	W	W	L	W	W
Position	7	4	3	2	2	1	2	1	2	1	2	2	2	2	4	3	2	2	2	2	1	3	3	3	4	3	3	3	3	2

Source: worldfootball.net
A = Away; H = Home; W = Win; D = Draw; L = Loss

==== Matches ====
14 October 2000 1	Wollongong Wolves	1–1	Perth Glory	Wollongong, New South Wales
18:30 AEDT	Young 52' (pen.)	Report	Mori 50'	Stadium: Brandon Park; Attendance: 5,443; Referee: Simon Micallef

22 October 2000 2	Carlton SC	0–3	Wollongong Wolves	Melbourne, Victoria
	Thompson 30'; Terminello 87'	Report	Chipperfield 58'; Stanton 80'	Stadium: Bob Jane Stadium; Attendance: 1,446; Referee: Eddie Lennie
Note: Carlton SC folded in December 2000 and match was retrospectively awarded a walkover

28 October 2000 3	Wollongong Wolves	1–0	Marconi Stallions	Wollongong, New South Wales
18:30 AEDT	Horsley 85'	Report		Stadium: Brandon Park; Attendance: 4,011; Referee: Mark Shield

5 November 2000 4	Melbourne Knights	1–2	Wollongong Wolves	Melbourne, Victoria
18:00 AEDT	Da Costa 79'	Report	Horsley 41'; Reid 42'	Stadium: Knights Stadium; Attendance: 4,863; Referee: Gerry Connolly

10 November 2000 5	Wollongong Wolves	2–1	Brisbane Strikers	Wollongong, New South Wales
19:30 AEDT	Young 31' (pen.), 77'	Report	Horsley 85' (o.g.)	Stadium: WIN Stadium; Attendance: 4,075; Referee: Brett Hugo

19 November 2000 6	Parramatta Power	0–2	Wollongong Wolves	Sydney, New South Wales
16:00 AEDT		Report	Petrovski 57'; Reid 78'	Stadium: Parramatta Stadium; Attendance: 4,138; Referee: Simon Micallef

24 November 2000 7	Wollongong Wolves	2–3	Canberra Cosmos	Wollongong, New South Wales
19:30 AEDT	Huxley 16'; Petrovski 86'	Report	Castro 46'; Angelucci 64', 66'	Stadium: WIN Stadium; Attendance: 3,876; Referee: Con Diomis

1 December 2000 8	Newcastle United	1–3	Wollongong Wolves	Newcastle, New South Wales
19:30 AEDT	McBreen 73'	Report	Chipperfield 23'; Stanton 28', 48'	Stadium: Marathon Stadium; Attendance: 8,257; Referee: Peter Green

10 December 2000 9	South Melbourne Lakers	4–2	Wollongong Wolves	Melbourne, Victoria
17:00 AEDT	Trimboli 27' (pen.); Vlahos 75'; Lozanovski 90+2'; Boutsianis 90+5'	Report	Chipperfield 25'; Reid 90+2'	Stadium: Bob Jane Stadium; Attendance: 7,589; Referee: (United States) Kevin Stott

16 December 2000 10	Wollongong Wolves	2–0	Sydney United Pumas	Wollongong, New South Wales
18:30 AEDT	Petrovski 49'; Ceccoli 80'	Report		Stadium: WIN Stadium; Attendance: 3,339; Referee: Gerry Connolly

23 December 2000 11	Sydney Olympic Lions	2–2	Wollongong Wolves	Sydney, New South Wales
18:30 AEDT	Baillie 61'; Kohler 71'	Report	Young 21'; Chipperfield 89'	Stadium: Belmore Sports Ground; Attendance: 4,263; Referee: Eddie Lennie

29 December 2000 12	Wollongong Wolves	4–2	Eastern Pride	Wollongong, New South Wales
19:30 AEDT	Chipperfield 5', 63', 73' (pen.); Reid 18'	Report	Roach 37'; Watkins 87'	Stadium: WIN Stadium; Attendance: 4,107; Referee: Brett Hugo

5 January 2001 13	Wollongong Wolves	1–1	Football Kingz	Wollongong, New South Wales
19:30 AEDT	Young 10' (pen.)	Report	Vicelich 57'	Stadium: WIN Stadium; Attendance: 4,077; Referee: Matthew Breeze

27 January 2001 16	Perth Glory	1–1	Wollongong Wolves	Perth, Western Australia
22:00 AEDT	Harnwell 84'	Report	Horsley 50'	Stadium: Perth Oval; Attendance: 16,019; Referee: Mark Shield

3 February 2001 17	Wollongong Wolves	3–0	Carlton	Wollongong, New South Wales
Note: The match was declared a 3–0 walkover to Wollongong Wolves after Carlton SC folded in December 2000.

10 February 2001 18	Marconi Stallions	1–3	Wollongong Wolves	Sydney, New South Wales
19:00 AEDT	Brownlie 3'	Report	Petrovski 11', 75'; Chipperfield 41'	Stadium: Marconi Stadium; Attendance: 3,712; Referee: Perry Mur

17 February 2001 19	Wollongong Wolves	5–2	Melbourne Knights	Wollongong, New South Wales
18:30 AEDT	Young 17', 65'; Petrovski 26', 60'; Chipperfield 73'	Report	Marth 24'; A. Cervinski 75'	Stadium: WIN Stadium; Attendance: 5,459; Referee: Brett Hugo

23 February 2001 20	Brisbane Strikers	2–4	Wollongong Wolves	Brisbane, Queensland
19:00 AEDT	Dwyer 18'; Buljan 28'	Report	Chipperfield 4'; Petrovski 60'; Reid 62'; Young 75'	Stadium: Ballymore Stadium; Attendance: 2,457; Referee: Simon Micallef

27 February 2001 14	Wollongong Wolves	2–2	Northern Spirit	Wollongong, New South Wales
18:30 AEDT	Harries 37'; Young 38'	Report	Burgess 27' (pen.); Langdon 88'	Stadium: WIN Stadium; Attendance: 5,575; Referee: Matthew Breeze

2 March 2001 21	Wollongong Wolves	5–1	Parramatta Power	Wollongong, New South Wales
18:30 AEDT	Petrovski 46', 47', 69'; Ceccoli 50'; Crews 83' (o.g.)	Report	Roodenburg 28'	Stadium: WIN Stadium; Attendance: 4,112; Referee: Eddie Lennie

10 March 2001 22	Canberra Cosmos	2–1	Wollongong Wolves	Canberra, ACT
18:30 AEDT	Cortes 82'; Angelucci 84'	Report	Young 44'	Stadium: Canberra Stadium; Attendance: 2,593; Referee: Angelo Nardi

16 March 2001 23	Wollongong Wolves	9–4	Newcastle United	Wollongong, New South Wales
19:30 AEDT	Chipperfield 19', 43'; Young 26', 71'; Reid 29'; Petrovski 42', 48', 60'; Blake 55'	Report	Masi 49', 86'; Juchniewicz 81'; Mansley 90'	Stadium: WIN Stadium; Attendance: 4,777; Referee: Simon Micallef

23 March 2001 24	Wollongong Wolves	0–1	South Melbourne Lakers	Wollongong, New South Wales
19:30 AEDT		Report	Trimboli 81'	Stadium: WIN Stadium; Attendance: 8,454; Referee: Mark Shield

25 March 2001 15	Adelaide City Force	1–1	Wollongong Wolves	Adelaide, South Australia
20:30 AEDT	Vidmar 27'	Report	Middleby 23'	Stadium: Hindmarsh Stadium; Attendance: 3,042; Referee: Eddie Lennie

1 April 2001 25	Sydney United Pumas	1–1	Wollongong Wolves	Sydney, New South Wales
15:00 AEDT	Talevski 76'	Report	Huxley 50'	Stadium: Sydney United Sports Centre; Attendance: 4,235; Referee: Con Diomis

7 April 2001 26	Wollongong Wolves	3–1	Sydney Olympic Lions	Wollongong, New South Wales
18:30 AEDT	Petrovski 36'; Stanton 46'; Horsley 90'	Report	Cardozo 76' (pen.)	Stadium: WIN Stadium; Attendance: 7,988; Referee: Eddie Lennie

14 April 2001 27	Eastern Pride	0–3	Wollongong Wolves	Morwell, Victoria
Note: Match awarded as a walkover to Wollongong Wolves

20 April 2001 28	Football Kingz	3–2	Wollongong Wolves	Auckland, New Zealand
16:30 AEDT	Urlovic 45'; Rufer 87' (pen.), 90'	Report	Young 13'; Reid 50'	Stadium: Ericsson Stadium; Attendance: 3,616; Referee: (New Zealand) Neil Fox

25 April 2001 29	Northern Spirit	0–4	Wollongong Wolves	Sydney, New South Wales
15:00 AEDT		Report	Horsley 45'; Chipperfield 47' (pen.); Petrovski 56', 66'	Stadium: North Sydney Oval; Attendance: 2,849; Referee: Simon Micallef

29 April 2001 30	Wollongong Wolves	6–2	Adelaide City Force	Wollongong, New South Wales
15:00 AEDT	Chipperfield 11', 51', 70', 77'; Stanton 28'; Petrovski 83'	Report	Tunbridge 45'; Pelosi 89' (pen.)	Stadium: WIN Stadium; Attendance: 6,128; Referee: Eddie Lennie

===== Finals series =====
11 May 2001 Major semi-final (Leg 1)	Wollongong Wolves	2–1	South Melbourne Lakers	Wollongong, New South Wales
18:30 AEDT	Petrovski 6'; Young 83' (pen.)	Report	Boutsianis 45'	Stadium: WIN Stadium; Attendance: 11,201; Referee: Mark Shield

20 May 2001 Major semi-final (Leg 2)	South Melbourne Lakers	1–2 (2–4 agg.)	Wollongong Wolves	Melbourne, Victoria
15:00 AEDT	Coveny 67'	Report	Horsley 50'; Petrovski 59'	Stadium: Bob Jane Stadium; Attendance: 10,113; Referee: Simon Micallef

3 June 2001 Grand final	Wollongong Wolves	2–1	South Melbourne Lakers	Sydney, New South Wales
12:00 AEDT	Petrovski 56'; Young 57'	Report	Anastasiadis 78'	Stadium: Parramatta Stadium; Attendance: 13,402; Referee: Eddie Lennie

=== Oceania Champions League ===
==== Group stage ====
Pos	Team	Pld	W	D	L	GF	GA	GD	Pts	Qualification	WOL	NAP	LAU	UNI	FOO	LOT
1	(Australia) Wollongong Wolves	5	5	0	0	38	0	+38	15	Advance to knockout stage	—	—	—	6–0	5–0	—
2	(New Zealand) Napier City Rovers	5	3	1	1	16	2	+14	10	Advance to knockout stage	0–1	—	1–1	—	—	—
3	(Solomon Islands) Laugu United	5	3	1	1	19	14	+5	10		0–10	—	—	—	—	7–0
4	(Papua New Guinea) Unitech	5	2	0	3	10	19	−9	6		—	0–2	2–8	—	—	—
5	(Fiji) Foodtown Warriors	5	1	0	4	7	17	−10	3		—	—	1–3	1–3	—	—
6	(Tonga) Lotohaʻapai	5	0	0	5	4	42	−38	0		0–16	0–9	—	—	2–5	—

Source: RSSSF

9 January 2001 1	Lotoha'apai (Tonga)	0–16	(Australia) Wollongong Wolves	Port Morseby, Papua New Guinea
13:30		Report	Petrovski 18', 26', 28', 31', 33', 39', 45'; Chipperfield 23', 48', 69'; Lucas 61', 74', 87'; Reid 71'; Beltrame 75'†; Young 77'	Stadium: Lloyd Robson Stadium; Referee: L. Fred (Vanuatu)
Note: † Beltrame (GK) scored from the rebound of a penalty taken by him

11 January 2001 2	Wollongong Wolves (Australia)	5–0	(Fiji) Foodtown Warriors	Port Morseby, Papua New Guinea
17:00	Young 1' (pen.); Chipperfield 10', 38'; Petrovski 67'; Lucas 90'	Report		Stadium: Lloyd Robson Stadium; Referee: H. Attison (Vanuatu)

13 January 2001 3	Laugu (Solomon Islands)	0–10	(Australia) Wollongong Wolves	Port Morseby, Papua New Guinea
16:00		Report	Young 13' (pen.); Chipperfield 39', 60'; Reid 43', 74'; Petrovski 49', 83'; Huxley 57'; Mennillo 76'; Cervinki 77'	Stadium: Lloyd Robson Stadium; Referee: B. Grimshaw (New Zealand)

15 January 2001 4	Wollongong Wolves (Australia)	6–0	(Papua New Guinea) Unitech FC	Port Morseby, Papua New Guinea
14:00	Chipperfield 6'; Reid 9'; Lucas 43', 81'; Petrovski 50'; Smith 83'	Report		Stadium: Lloyd Robson Stadium; Referee: H. Attison (Vanuatu)

17 January 2001 5	Napier City Rovers (New Zealand)	0–1	(Australia) Wollongong Wolves	Port Morseby, Papua New Guinea
16:00		Report	Petrovski 39'	Stadium: Lloyd Robson Stadium; Referee: H. Attison (Vanuatu)

==== Knockout stage ====
===== Semi-finals =====
20 January 2001 Semi-final	Wollongong Wolves (Australia)	4–2	(French Polynesia) Vénus	Port Moresby, Papua New Guinea
13:00	Petrovski 28'; Lucas 43', 63'; Chipperfield 45' (pen.)	(Report)	Djamali 78'; Izal 85'	Stadium: Lloyd Robson Stadium; Referee: S. Maidan (Singapore)

===== Final =====
22 January 2001 Final	Wollongong Wolves (Australia)	1–0	(Vanuatu) Tafea	Port Moresby, Papua New Guinea
15:30	Scott Chipperfield 62'	(Report)		Stadium: Lloyd Robson Stadium; Attendance: 3,000

=== FIFA Club World Championship ===
As winners of the 2001 Oceania Club Championship, the Wollongong Wolves was one of the 12 teams that were invited to the 2001 FIFA Club World Championship, which would be hosted in Spain from 28 July to 12 August 2001. However, the tournament was cancelled, primarily due to the collapse of ISL, which was marketing partner of FIFA at the time.

==== Group stage ====
Team	Pld	W	D	L	GF	GA	GD	Pts
(Argentina) Boca Juniors	0	0	0	0	0	0	0	0
(Spain) Deportivo de La Coruña	0	0	0	0	0	0	0	0
(Australia) Wollongong Wolves	0	0	0	0	0	0	0	0
(Egypt) Zamalek SC	0	0	0	0	0	0	0	0

29 July 2001 1	Zamalek SC (Egypt)	Cancelled	(Australia) Wollongong Wolves	A Coruña, Spain
				Stadium: Estadio Riazor

1 August 2001 2	Deportivo de La Coruña (Spain)	Cancelled	(Australia) Wollongong Wolves	A Coruña, Spain
				Stadium: Estadio Riazor

4 August 2001 3	Wollongong Wolves (Australia)	Cancelled	(Argentina) Boca Juniors	Santiago de Compostela, Spain
				Stadium: Estadio Multiusos de San Lázaro
