= 1999–2000 Wollongong Wolves FC season =

Wollongong Wolves
1999–2000 season
- Manager: Nick Theodorakopoulos
- Stadium: Brandon Park, North Wollongong
- NSL: 2nd
- NSL Finals Series: Champions
- Top goalscorer: League: Stuart Young (19); All: Stuart Young (19)

The 1999–2000 Wollongong Wolves season was the club's 20th season since its establishment in 1980. The club participated in the National Soccer League for the 19th time. They were crowned runners-up in the premiership and the champions of the finals series.

== Players ==
=== Squad ===
Note: Flags indicate national team as defined under FIFA eligibility rules; some limited exceptions apply. Players may hold more than one non-FIFA nationality.

No.	Pos.	Nation	Player
1	GK	AUS	Les Pogliacomi
2	DF	AUS	George Souris
3	DF	AUS	Alvin Ceccoli
4	DF	AUS	Robbie Stanton
5	DF	AUS	David Cervinski
6	MF	AUS	Matt Horsley (captain)
7	MF	AUS	Paul Reid
8	MF	AUS	Anthony Surjan
10	FW	ENG	Stuart Young
11	MF	AUS	Scott Chipperfield
12	MF	NZL	Neil Harlock
13	MF	AUS	Noel Spencer
14	FW	AUS	Sasho Petrovski

No.	Pos.	Nation	Player
15	DF	AUS	David Huxley
16	MF	AUS	Bevan Sullivan
17	MF	AUS	Ben Blake
17	FW	FIJ	Esala Masi
20	GK	AUS	Daniel Beltrame
21	MF	AUS	Mark Robertson
23	MF	AUS	Dino Mennillo
—	DF	AUS	Paul Dimech
—	DF	AUS	Graeme Goodfellow
—	DF	AUS	Peter Lahanas
—	DF	AUS	Paul O'Grady
—	MF	AUS	Chad Bishop
—	FW	AUS	Sasho Dimoski

Source: WorldFootball

=== Transfers in ===
No.	Pos.	Nat.	Name	Age	Moving from	Type	Transfer window	Ends	Transfer fee	Source

=== Transfers out ===
No.	Pos.	Nat.	Name	Age	Moving to	Type	Transfer window	Transfer fee	Source

== Technical staff ==
Position	Name
Manager	(Australia) Nick Theodorakopoulos
Assistant Manager	(Australia) Ron Corry

== Statistics ==
=== Squad statistics ===
N	Pos.	Nat.	Name	Total					NSL					NSL Finals
N	Pos.	Nat.	Name	Apps	Goals	Yellow card	Second yellow card	Red card	Apps	Goals	Yellow card	Second yellow card	Red card	Apps	Goals	Yellow card	Second yellow card	Red card
1	GK	(Australia)	Les Pogliacomi	34	0	0	0	0	30	0	0	0	0	4	0	0	0	0
2	DF	(Australia)	George Souris	31	1	0	0	0	22+7	1	0	0	0	0+2	0	0	0	0
3	DF	(Australia)	Alvin Ceccoli	27	2	0	0	0	23	2	0	0	0	4	0	0	0	0
4	DF	(Australia)	Robbie Stanton	38	0	1	0	0	34	0	0	0	0	4	0	1	0	0
5	DF	(Australia)	David Cervinski	35	3	0	0	0	28+3	3	0	0	0	4	0	0	0	0
6	MF	(Australia)	Matt Horsley	36	5	0	0	0	32	4	0	0	0	4	1	0	0	0
7	MF	(Australia)	Paul Reid	31	3	0	0	1	23+4	2	0	0	1	4	1	0	0	0
8	MF	(Australia)	Anthony Surjan	21	0	0	0	0	9+12	0	0	0	0	0	0	0	0	0
10	FW	(England)	Stuart Young	33	19	0	0	0	29	17	0	0	0	4	2	0	0	0
11	MF	(Australia)	Scott Chipperfield	35	13	1	0	0	31	12	0	0	0	4	1	1	0	0
12	MF	(New Zealand)	Neil Harlock	20	1	0	0	0	13+7	1	0	0	0	0	0	0	0	0
13	MF	(Australia)	Noel Spencer	35	0	0	0	0	16+15	0	0	0	0	4	0	0	0	0
14	FW	(Australia)	Sasho Petrovski	36	14	0	0	0	24+8	14	0	0	0	2+2	0	0	0	0
15	DF	(Australia)	David Huxley	31	0	0	0	1	19+11	0	0	0	1	0+1	0	0	0	0
16	MF	(Australia)	Bevan Sullivan	1	0	0	0	0	1	0	0	0	0	0	0	0	0	0
17	MF	(Australia)	Ben Blake	8	1	0	0	0	1+7	1	0	0	0	0	0	0	0	0
18	FW	(Fiji)	Esala Masi	30	12	0	0	1	16+10	11	0	0	1	2+2	1	0	0	0
20	GK	(Australia)	Daniel Beltrame	4	0	0	0	0	4	0	0	0	0	0	0	0	0	0
21	MF	(Australia)	Mark Robertson	12	0	1	0	0	4+5	0	0	0	0	0+3	0	1	0	0
23	MF	(Australia)	Dino Mennillo	17	4	1	0	0	13	4	0	0	0	4	0	1	0	0
	DF	(Australia)	Paul Dimech	2	2	0	0	0	0+2	2	0	0	0	0	0	0	0	0
	DF	(Australia)	Graeme Goodfellow	0	0	0	0	0	0	0	0	0	0	0	0	0	0	0
	DF	(Australia)	Peter Lahanas	4	0	0	0	0	0+4	0	0	0	0	0	0	0	0	0
	DF	(Australia)	Paul O'Grady	2	0	0	0	0	2	0	0	0	0	0	0	0	0	0
	MF	(Australia)	Chad Bishop	0	0	0	0	0	0	0	0	0	0	0	0	0	0	0
	FW	(Australia)	Sasho Dimoski	3	0	0	0	0	0+3	0	0	0	0	0	0	0	0	0

- Last updated: 18 July 2015
- Source: worldfootball.net
- (yellow card) = Number of bookings; (second yellow card) = Number of sending offs after a second yellow card; (red card) = Number of sending offs by a direct red card.

== Competitions ==
=== Overall ===
Competition	Started round	Final position / round	First match	Last match
National Soccer League	—	2nd	3 October 1999	7 May 2000
National Soccer League Finals	Semi-finals	Champions	21 May 2015	11 June 2015

=== National Soccer League ===
==== League table ====
Pos	Team	Pld	W	D	L	GF	GA	GD	Pts	Qualification
1	Perth Glory	34	19	7	8	60	42	+18	64	Qualification for the Finals series
2	Wollongong Wolves (C)	34	17	9	8	72	44	+28	60	Qualification for the Finals series and the Oceania Club Championship
3	Carlton	34	17	7	10	55	39	+16	58	Qualification for the Finals series
4	Adelaide Force	34	16	8	10	57	37	+20	56	Qualification for the Finals series
5	Sydney Olympic	34	16	7	11	56	40	+16	55	Qualification for the Finals series
6	Marconi Fairfield	34	16	7	11	53	49	+4	55	Qualification for the Finals series
7	Newcastle Breakers	34	14	9	11	44	44	0	51	
8	Auckland Kingz	34	15	5	14	57	59	−2	50	
9	Brisbane Strikers	34	13	10	11	46	40	+6	49	
10	South Melbourne	34	14	7	13	55	51	+4	49	
11	Parramatta Power	34	14	5	15	52	47	+5	47	
12	Melbourne Knights	34	13	6	15	44	57	−13	45	
13	Northern Spirit	34	11	3	20	41	58	−17	36	
14	Canberra Cosmos	34	9	9	16	44	64	−20	36	
15	Gippsland Falcons	34	7	8	19	23	49	−26	29	
16	Sydney United	34	5	5	24	19	58	−39	20	

Source: rsssf.com
Rules for classification: 1) points; 2) goal difference; 3) number of goals scored.
(C) Champions

==== Results by round ====
Round	1	2	3	4	5	6	7	8	9	10	11	12	13	14	15	16	17	18	19	20	21	22	23	24	25	26	27	28	29	30	31	32	33	34
Ground	H	A	H	A	A	H	A	H	A	H	A	H	A	H	A	H	H	A	A	H	A	H	H	A	H	A	H	A	H	A	H	A	H	A
Result	W	D	L	D	D	W	W	W	L	L	W	W	D	W	D	W	W	W	L	L	D	D	W	W	W	D	L	W	W	W	D	W	L	L
Position	4	3	8	9	9	7	5	4	6	6	5	4	4	5	5	3	3	1	3	3	3	4	4	3	3	2	2	2	2	1	1	1	2	2

Source: worldfootball.net
A = Away; H = Home; W = Win; D = Draw; L = Loss

==== Matches ====
3 October 1999 1	Wollongong Wolves	2–1	South Melbourne	Wollongong, New South Wales
	Masi 6'; Harlock 36'	Report	Magnacca 89'	Stadium: Brandon Park; Attendance: 4,831; Referee: Matthew Breeze

8 October 1999 2	Newcastle Breakers	2–2	Wollongong Wolves	Newcastle, New South Wales
	Pryce 36'; Buonavoglia 54'	Report	Masi 41'; Petrovski 88'	Stadium: Breakers Stadium; Attendance: 6,023; Referee: Simon Micallef

16 October 1999 3	Wollongong Wolves	0–4	Sydney Olympic	Wollongong, New South Wales
		Report	Cardozo 7', 70', 80'; Arambasic 28'	Stadium: Brandon Park; Attendance: 5,021; Referee: Gerry Connolly

24 October 1999 4	Sydney Olympic	1–1	Wollongong Wolves	Sydney, New South Wales
	Tsekenis 77'	Report	Young 78'	Stadium: Belmore Sports Ground; Attendance: 5,035; Referee: Brett Hugo

29 October 1999 5	Football Kingz	3–3	Wollongong Wolves	Auckland, New Zealand
	De Jong 51'; Mennillo 77'; Jones 89'	Report	Horsley 3'; Reid 38'; Masi 61'	Stadium: North Harbour Stadium; Attendance: 4,500; Referee: Matthew Breeze

7 November 1999 6	Wollongong Wolves	3–0	Northern Spirit	Wollongong, New South Wales
	Petrovski 1', 33'; Young 62'	Report		Stadium: Brandon Park; Attendance: 5,123; Referee: Eddie Lennie

13 November 1999 7	Football Kingz	2–4	Wollongong Wolves	Christchurch, New Zealand
	Rufer 61' (pen.), 84' (pen.)	Report	Masi 36'; Chipperfield 40'; Young 70', 82' (pen.)	Stadium: Jade Stadium; Attendance: 4,186; Referee: D. Rugg

21 November 1999 8	Wollongong Wolves	2–0	Gippsland Falcons	Wollongong, New South Wales
	Cervinski 5'; Petrovski 57'	Report		Stadium: Brandon Park; Attendance: 3,450; Referee: B. Precious

28 November 1999 9	Marconi-Fairfield	1–0	Wollongong Wolves	Sydney, New South Wales
	Trajanovski 22' (pen.)	Report		Stadium: Marconi Stadium; Attendance: 5,774; Referee: Brett Hugo

3 December 1999 10	Wollongong Wolves	1–2	Melbourne Knights	Wollongong, New South Wales
	Souris 22'	Report	A. Cervinski 64'; Kelic 68'	Stadium: Brandon Park; Attendance: 3,414; Referee: Mark Shield

20 December 1999 11	Adelaide Force	1–2	Wollongong Wolves	Adelaide, South Australia
	Pelosi 59'	Report	Petrovski 1'; Chipperfield 89'	Stadium: Hindmarsh Stadium; Attendance: 3,764; Referee: Craig Zetter

19 December 1999 12	Wollongong Wolves	3–0	Canberra Cosmos	Wollongong, New South Wales
	Petrovski 15', 83'; Chipperfield 77'	Report		Stadium: Brandon Park; Attendance: 2,497; Referee: David Dwight

23 December 1999 15	South Melbourne	1–1	Wollongong Wolves	Melbourne, Victoria
	Curcija 83' (pen.)	Report	Stuart Young 36' (pen.)	Stadium: Bob Jane Stadium; Attendance: 4,639; Referee: David Dwight

28 December 1999 13	Brisbane Strikers	1–1	Wollongong Wolves	Brisbane, Queensland
	Harris 56'	Report	Petrovski 29'	Stadium: Suncorp Stadium; Attendance: 2,611; Referee: Simon Micallef

2 January 2000 14	Wollongong Wolves	4–3	Parramatta Power	Wollongong, New South Wales
	Masi 2', 10', 58'; Chipperfield 56'	Report	Burns 7'; Byrnes 16'; Sterjovski 72'	Stadium: Brandon Park; Attendance: 3,844; Referee: Eddie Lennie

16 January 2000 16	Wollongong Wolves	3–2	Carlton	Wollongong, New South Wales
	Chipperfield 15'; Young 59'; Masi 83'	Report	Thompson 17'; McPherson 86'	Stadium: Brandon Park; Attendance: 4,294; Referee: Mark Shield

23 January 2000 17	Wollongong Wolves	1–0	Sydney United	Wollongong, New South Wales
	Petrovski 8'	Report		Stadium: Brandon Park; Attendance: 5,842; Referee: Con Diomis

26 January 2000 18	Sydney United	2–5	Wollongong Wolves	Sydney, New South Wales
	Bosnar 10'; Maric 78'	Report	Young 3', 11'; Horsley 71'; Masi 85'; Chipperfield 88'	Stadium: Sydney United Sports Centre; Attendance: 3,112; Referee: Matthew Breeze

30 January 2000 19	Perth Glory	2–1	Wollongong Wolves	Perth, Western Australia
	Buljan 34'; Edwards 63'	Report	Chipperfield 86'	Stadium: Perth Oval; Attendance: 9,657; Referee: Gerry Connolly

6 February 2000 20	Wollongong Wolves	1–2	Newcastle Breakers	Wollongong, New South Wales
	Chipperfield 7'	Report	Buonavoglia 60'; Owens 86'	Stadium: Brandon Park; Attendance: 4,438; Referee: Brett Hugo

13 February 2000 21	Sydney Olympic	2–2	Wollongong Wolves	Sydney, New South Wales
	Emerton 27'; Baillie 81'	Report	Mennillo 13'; Ceccoli 48'	Stadium: Belmore Sports Ground; Attendance: 5,638; Referee: Simon Micallef

19 February 2000 22	Wollongong Wolves	1–1	Sydney Olympic	Wollongong, New South Wales
	Mennillo 33'	Report	Arambasic 51'	Stadium: Brandon Park; Attendance: 7,351; Referee: Matthew Breeze

27 February 2000 23	Wollongong Wolves	3–1	Football Kingz	Wollongong, New South Wales
	Young 45', 56'; Masi 49'	Report	Ngata 38' (pen.)	Stadium: Brandon Park; Attendance: 3,313; Referee: D. Rugg

3 March 2000 24	Northern Spirit	0–3	Wollongong Wolves	Sydney, New South Wales
		Report	Young 21' (pen.); Cervinski 26'; Horsley 57'	Stadium: North Sydney Oval; Attendance: 5,500; Referee: Brett Hugo

12 March 2000 25	Wollongong Wolves	5–1	Football Kingz	Wollongong, New South Wales
	Mennillo 48'; Reid 59'; Horsley 60'; Young 85'; Blake 90+2'	Report	Bunce 29'	Stadium: Brandon Park; Attendance: 3,618; Referee: Con Diomis

18 March 2000 26	Gippsland Falcons	1–1	Wollongong Wolves	Morwell, Victoria
	Vargas 66' (pen.)	Report	Mennillo 9'	Stadium: Mobil Park; Attendance: 1,700; Referee: D. Rugg

26 March 2000 27	Wollongong Wolves	1–2	Marconi-Fairfield	Wollongong, New South Wales
	Masi 27'	Report	Awaritefe 35'; Babic 45'	Stadium: Brandon Park; Attendance: 7,338; Referee: Eddie Lennie

2 April 2000 28	Melbourne Knights	0–4	Wollongong Wolves	Melbourne, Victoria
		Report	Chipperfield 18', 38'; Petrovski 28', 70'	Stadium: Knights Stadium; Attendance: 3,631; Referee: J. Blaney

9 April 2000 29	Wollongong Wolves	1–0	Adelaide Force	Wollongong, New South Wales
	Petrovski 34'	Report		Stadium: Brandon Park; Attendance: 5,518; Referee: Eddie Lennie

14 April 2000 30	Canberra Cosmos	0–6	Wollongong Wolves	Canberra, ACT
		Report	Chipperfield 32', 45'; Young 64', 76' (pen.), 80', 90+1'	Stadium: Bruce Stadium; Attendance: 1,214; Referee: Craig Zetter

22 April 2000 31	Wollongong Wolves	2–2	Brisbane Strikers	Wollongong, New South Wales
	Petrovski 17', 57'	Report	North 85'; Foster 90+5'	Stadium: Brandon Park; Attendance: 5,253; Referee: Simon Micallef

25 April 2000 32	Parramatta Power	1–2	Wollongong Wolves	Sydney, New South Wales
	Griffiths 54'	Report	Young 28'; Cervinski 77'	Stadium: Parramatta Stadium; Attendance: 5,180; Referee: Eddie Lennie

30 April 2000 33	Wollongong Wolves	0–1	Perth Glory	Wollongong, New South Wales
		Report	Harnwell 50'	Stadium: Brandon Park; Attendance: 8,815; Referee: Gerry Connolly

7 May 2000 34	Carlton	2–1	Wollongong Wolves	Melbourne, Victoria
	Moreira 17'; Marth 54' (pen.)	Report	Ceccoli 26'	Stadium: Olympic Park Stadium; Attendance: 1,704; Referee: Simon Micallef

===== Final Series =====
21 May 2000 Major Semifinal (L1)	Wollongong Wolves	1–0	Perth Glory	Wollongong, New South Wales
	Young 28' (pen.)	Report		Stadium: Brandon Park; Attendance: 8,326; Referee: Brett Hugo

27 May 2000 Major Semifinal (L2)	Perth Glory	2–0 (a.e.t.)	Wollongong Wolves	Perth, Western Australia
	Trajkovski 85' (pen.); Ergic 93'	Report		Stadium: Subiaco Oval; Attendance: 42,760; Referee: Mark Shield

4 June 2000 Preliminary Final	Wollongong Wolves	2–1	Carlton	Wollongong, New South Wales
	Masi 24'; Young 45'	Report	Markovski 18'	Stadium: Brandon Park; Attendance: 8,034; Referee: Simon Micallef

11 June 2000 Grand Final	Perth Glory	3–3 (a.e.t.) (6–7 p)	Wollongong Wolves	Perth, Western Australia
13:30 AWST	Despotovski 20'; Milicevic 33'; Harnwell 42'	Report	Chipperfield 56'; Horsely 69'; Reid 89'	Stadium: Subiaco Oval; Attendance: 43,242; Referee: Mark Shield
	Penalties
	Trajkovski (penalty scored); Harnwell (penalty scored); Schwertz (penalty scored); Naven (penalty scored); Wehman (penalty scored); Junior (penalty missed); Edwards (penalty missed); Milicevic (penalty scored); Afkos (penalty missed)		Young (penalty scored); Robertson (penalty scored); Ceccoli (penalty scored); Pogliacomi (penalty scored); Petrovski (penalty scored); Horsley (penalty missed); Mennillo (penalty missed); Chipperfield (penalty scored); Reid (penalty scored)
