= 2001 OFC Club Championship =

Tournament details
- Host country: Papua New Guinea
- Dates: 9–22 January 2001
- Teams: 11 (from 11 associations)

Final positions
- Champions: (Australia) Wollongong Wolves (1st title)
- Runners-up: (Vanuatu) Tafea
- Third place: (New Zealand) Napier City Rovers
- Fourth place: (French Polynesia) AS Vénus

Tournament statistics
- Matches played: 23
- Goals scored: 160 (6.96 per match)
- Top scorer(s): (Australia) Sasho Petrovski (13 goals)

The 2001 OFC Club Championship was the third season of Oceania's premier club football tournament organised by OFC.

Wollongong Wolves defeated Tafea 1–0 in the final, which was played at Lloyd Robines Stadium in Port Moresby, Papua New Guinea. As winners, Wollongong Wolves qualified for the 2001 FIFA Club World Championship, which was however cancelled.

South Melbourne were the defending champions, but did not qualify for the tournament.

== Participants ==
Location of teams of the 2001 OFC Club Championship.

A total of 11 teams from 11 OFC member associations entered the competition.

Association	Team	Qualifying method
Teams entering the group stage
(American Samoa) American Samoa	PanSa	2000 ASFA Soccer League champion
Australia	Wollongong Wolves	1999–2000 Australian National Soccer League champion
(Cook Islands) Cook Islands	Tupapa Maraerenga	1999–2000 Cook Islands Cup winners
Fiji	Foodtown Warriors Labasa	2000 Fiji National Club Championship champion
(New Zealand) New Zealand	Napier City Rovers	2000 New Zealand National Soccer League champion
(Papua New Guinea) Papua New Guinea	Unitech	2000 Papua New Guinea National Club Championship Champion
Samoa	Titavi	2000 Samoa National League champion
(Solomon Islands) Solomon Islands	Laugu United	2000 Honiara FA League champion
(French Polynesia) Tahiti	Vénus	1999–2000 Tahiti Ligue 1 champion
Tonga	Lotoha'apai	2000 Tonga Club Championship champion
Vanuatu	Tafea	2000 Vanuatu Port Vila Football League champion

== Schedule ==
Schedule for 2001 OFC Club Championship
Phase	Round	Dates
Group stage	Matchday 1	9–10 January 2001
Group stage	Matchday 2	11–12 January 2001
Group stage	Matchday 3	13–14 January 2001
Group stage	Matchday 4	15–16 January 2001
Group stage	Matchday 5	17–18 January 2001
Knockout stage	Semi-finals	20 January 2001
Knockout stage	Third place play-off	22 January 2001
Knockout stage	Final	22 January 2001

== Group stage ==
=== Group A ===
Pos	Team	Pld	W	D	L	GF	GA	GD	Pts	Qualification	WOL	NAP	LAU	UNI	FOO	LOT
1	(Australia) Wollongong Wolves	5	5	0	0	38	0	+38	15	Advance to knockout stage	—	—	—	6–0	5–0	—
2	(New Zealand) Napier City Rovers	5	3	1	1	16	2	+14	10	Advance to knockout stage	0–1	—	1–1	—	—	—
3	(Solomon Islands) Laugu United	5	3	1	1	19	14	+5	10		0–10	—	—	—	—	7–0
4	(Papua New Guinea) Unitech	5	2	0	3	10	19	−9	6		—	0–2	2–8	—	—	—
5	(Fiji) Foodtown Warriors	5	1	0	4	7	17	−10	3		—	—	1–3	1–3	—	—
6	(Tonga) Lotohaʻapai	5	0	0	5	4	42	−38	0		0–16	0–9	—	—	2–5	—

Source: RSSSF
9 January 2001
13:30

Lotohaʻapai (Tonga)	0–16	(Australia) Wollongong Wolves
	Report	Petrovski 18', 26', 28', 31', 33', 39', 45'; Chipperfield 23', 48', 69'; Lucas 61', 74', 87'; Reid 71'; Beltrame 75'; Young 77'

Lloyd Robson Stadium, Port Moresby
Referee: L. Fred (Vanuatu)
9 January 2001
15:30

Foodtown Warriors (Fiji)	1–3	(Solomon Islands) Laugu United
Voli 78'	Report	Misitomu 42', 73'; Suri 65'

Lloyd Robson Stadium, Port Moresby
Referee: Mark Shield (Australia)
9 January 2001
17:30

Unitech (Papua New Guinea)	0–2	(New Zealand) Napier City Rovers
	Report	Pilcher 12'; Akers 34'

Lloyd Robson Stadium, Port Moresby
Referee: Brett Hugo (Australia)

11 January 2001
13:00

Napier City Rovers (New Zealand)	1–1	(Solomon Islands) Laugu United
McIvor 78'	Report	Misitomu 71'

Lloyd Robson Stadium, Port Moresby
Referee: Brett Hugo (Australia)
11 January 2001
15:00

Unitech (Papua New Guinea)	5–2	(Tonga) Lotohaʻapai
Komboi 39', 61'; Gebo 42'; Pui 63'; Winaulin 88'	Report	Fakava 26'; Tahitua 89'

Lloyd Robson Stadium, Port Moresby
Referee: Mark Shield (Australia)
11 January 2001
17:00

Wollongong Wolves (Australia)	5–0	(Fiji) Foodtown Warriors
Young 1' (pen.); Chipperfield 10', 38'; Petrovski 67'; Lucas 90'	Report

Lloyd Robson Stadium, Port Moresby
Referee: H. Attison (Vanuatu)

13 January 2001
12:00

Foodtown Warriors (Fiji)	1–3	(Papua New Guinea) Unitech
Solomoni 32'	Report	Konofilia 15', 60'; Komboi 38'

Lloyd Robson Stadium, Port Moresby
Referee: Gerry Connolly (Australia)
13 January 2001
14:00

Lotohaʻapai (Tonga)	0–9	(New Zealand) Napier City Rovers
	Report	Gearey 22', 25', 61', 63'; Birnie 26', 85'; Cotton 60', 64'; Cudd 90'

Lloyd Robson Stadium, Port Moresby
Referee: H. Atisson (Vanuatu)
13 January 2001
16:00

Laugu United (Solomon Islands)	0–10	(Australia) Wollongong Wolves
	Report	Young 13' (pen.); Chipperfield 39', 60'; Reid 43', 74'; Petrovski 49', 83'; Huxley 57'; Mennillo 76'; Cervinski 77'

Lloyd Robson Stadium, Port Moresby
Referee: B. Grimshaw (New Zealand)

15 January 2001
12:00

Foodtown Warriors (Fiji)	0–4	(New Zealand) Napier City Rovers
	Report	Pilcher 22'; Akers 73'; Birnie 78'; Ryan 85'

Lloyd Robson Stadium, Port Moresby
Referee: L. Fred (Vanuatu)
15 January 2001
14:00

Wollongong Wolves (Australia)	6–0	(Papua New Guinea) Unitech
Chipperfield 6'; Reid 9'; Lucas 43', 81'; Petrovski 50'; Smith 83'	Report

Lloyd Robson Stadium, Port Moresby
Referee: H. Attison (Vanuatu)
15 January 2001
16:00

Laugu United (Solomon Islands)	7–0	(Tonga) Lotohaʻapai
Suri 55', 65', 75', 80', 90'; Mamani 58'; Araha 63'	Report

Lloyd Robson Stadium, Port Moresby
Referee: Gerry Connolly (Australia)

17 January 2001
12:00

Unitech (Papua New Guinea)	2–8	(Solomon Islands) Laugu United
Komboi 32'; Puy 46'	Report	Ofu 8', 64', 77'; Suri 16', 66'; Kiriau 50'; Leo 75'; Araha 89'

Lloyd Robson Stadium, Port Moresby
Referee: Gerry Connolly (Australia)
17 January 2001
14:00

Lotohaʻapai (Tonga)	2–5	(Fiji) Foodtown Warriors
Maamola 11'; Leona 78'	Report	Sharma 19', 34', 49'; Waqa 78'; Solomoni 90'

Lloyd Robson Stadium, Port Moresby
Referee: N. Fox (New Zealand)
17 January 2001
16:00

Napier City Rovers (New Zealand)	0–1	(Australia) Wollongong Wolves
	Report	Petrovski 39'

Lloyd Robson Stadium, Port Moresby
Referee: H. Atisson (Vanuautu)

=== Group B ===
Pos	Team	Pld	W	D	L	GF	GA	GD	Pts	Qualification	TAF	ASV	TIT	TUP	PAN
1	(Vanuatu) Tafea	4	4	0	0	22	1	+21	12	Advance to knockout stage	—	6–0	5–1	—	0–2 (Note: Awarded 2-0, not played as PanSa could not field full team.)
2	(French Polynesia) AS Vénus	4	3	0	1	18	7	+11	9	Advance to knockout stage	—	—	—	10–1	0–2 (Note: Awarded 2-0; originally 1-1; ineligible players PanSa.)
3	(Samoa) Titavi	4	2	0	2	5	11	−6	6		—	0–6	—	2–0	—
4	(Cook Islands) Tupapa	4	1	0	3	3	21	−18	3		0–9	—	—	—	—
5	(American Samoa) PanSa	4	0	0	4	0	8	−8	0		—	—	0–2 (Note: Awarded 0-2, not played as PanSa withdrew.)	0–2 (Note: Awarded 0-2; originally 4-0; ineligible players PanSa.)	—

Source: RSSSF
Notes:
10 January 2001
15:00

AS Vénus (French Polynesia)	2–0 Awarded	(American Samoa) PanSa
Garcia 85'	Report	Concalves 16'

Lloyd Robson Stadium, Port Moresby
Referee: B. Grimshaw (New Zealand)
10 January 2001
17:00

Tafea (Vanuatu)	5–1	(Samoa) Titavi
Poida 16', 31', 53'; Vari 45' (pen.); Iwai 88'	Report	Michael 64'

Lloyd Robson Stadium, Port Moresby
Referee: Gerry Connolly (Australia)

12 January 2001
14:00

Titavi (Samoa)	0–6	(French Polynesia) AS Vénus
	Report	Garcia 12'; Tagawa 14'; Djamali 42'; Ilengo 53', 90'; Jakobsen 88'

Lloyd Robson Stadium, Port Moresby
Referee: L. Fred (Vanuatu)
12 January 2001

PanSa (American Samoa)	0–2 Awarded	(Cook Islands) Tupapa
	Report

Lloyd Robson Stadium, Port Moresby
Referee: Mark Shield (Australia)

14 January 2001
14:00

Tafea (Vanuatu)	2–0 Forfeit	(American Samoa) PanSa
	Report

Lloyd Robson Stadium, Port Moresby
14 January 2001
16:00

AS Vénus (French Polynesia)	10–1	(Cook Islands) Tupapa
Garcia 4'; Djamali 18', 84'; Tagawa 27', 48', 57'; Jakobsen 39'; Ilengo 74', 88'; Fatupua 80'	Report	Arona 89'

Lloyd Robson Stadium, Port Moresby

16 January 2001
14:00

Tupapa (Cook Islands)	0–9	(Vanuatu) Tafea
	Report	Iwai 2', 82'; Natuoivi 21'; Mermer 22', 27', 39'; Vari 25'; Poida 77'; Haitong 80'

Lloyd Robson Stadium, Port Moresby
Referee: Brett Hugo (Australia)
16 January 2001
16:00

PanSa (American Samoa)	0–2 Forfeit	(Samoa) Titavi
	Report

Lloyd Robson Stadium, Port Moresby

18 January 2001
14:00

Titavi (Samoa)	2–0	(Cook Islands) Tupapa
	Report

Lloyd Robson Stadium, Port Moresby
18 January 2001
16:00

Tafea (Vanuatu)	6–0	(French Polynesia) AS Vénus
	Report

Lloyd Robson Stadium, Port Moresby

Note: The OFC disciplinary committee ruled that 7 of PanSa's 18 players were not registered according to international transfer rules, some of which had been fielded in their first two matches. The first two matches were thus awarded 2–0 to the opposition, whilst PanSa were unable to field a team in the 3rd match (which was not played, and subsequently awarded 2–0 to Tafea). PanSa then withdrew from the competition, causing their fourth match to be awarded 2–0 to Titavi.

== Knockout stage ==
=== Bracket ===
Semi-finals
20 January – Port Moresby
(Australia) Wollongong Wolves	4
(French Polynesia) AS Vénus	2
20 January – Port Moresby
(Vanuatu) Tafea	4
(New Zealand) Napier City Rovers	2

Final
22 January – Port Moresby
(Australia) Wollongong Wolves	1
(Vanuatu) Tafea	0
Third place play-off
22 January – Port Moresby
(French Polynesia) AS Vénus	2
(New Zealand) Napier City Rovers	3

=== Semi-finals ===
20 January 2001
13:00

Wollongong Wolves (Australia)	4–2	(French Polynesia) AS Vénus
Petrovski 28'; Lucas 43', 63'; Chipperfield 45' (pen.)	Report	Djamali 78'; Iszal 85'

Lloyd Robson Stadium, Port Moresby
Referee: S. Maiden (Singapore)

20 January 2001
15:30

Tafea (Vanuatu)	4–2	(New Zealand) Napier City Rovers
R. Iwai 36', 89'; Mermer 60'; Haitong 88'	Report	McIvor 45'; Ryan 90'

Lloyd Robson Stadium, Port Moresby
Referee: S.M. Salleh (Malaysia)

=== Third place play-off ===
22 January 2001
13:00

AS Vénus (French Polynesia)	2–3	(New Zealand) Napier City Rovers
Jacobsen 44'; Ilengo 74'	Report	Ryan 11'; Akers 23'; Gearey 86'

Lloyd Robson Stadium, Port Moresby

=== Final ===
22 January 2001
15:30

Wollongong Wolves (Australia)	1–0	(Vanuatu) Tafea
Chipperfield 62'	Report

Lloyd Robson Stadium, Port Moresby
