= Robert Stanton (soccer) =

Australian soccer player and coach

Robbie Stanton
Personal information
- Full name: Robert James Stanton
- Date of birth: 15 April 1972 (age 54)
- Place of birth: Sydney, Australia
- Position: Defender

Team information
- Current team: Iraq (assistant coach)

Youth career
- 1990: AIS

Senior career*
Years	Team	Apps	(Gls)
1990–1995	Sydney United	120	(3)
1995–1997	Marconi Stallions	57	(0)
1997–2003	Wollongong Wolves	152	(7)
2003–2006	APIA Leichhardt	?	(?)

International career
1990	Australian Schoolboy	?	(?)
1991	Australia U20	?	(?)

Managerial career
- 2007: Sutherland Sharks
- 2009–2014: Sutherland Sharks
- 2015–2020: Sydney FC Youth
- 2023–2025: Newcastle Jets
- 2025–: Iraq (assistant)
- * Club domestic league appearances and goals

Robert Stanton (born 15 April 1972) is an Australian soccer coach and former player who primarily played as a defender. He is the current assistant coach of the Iraq national team.

== Club career ==
Stanton began his football career at the Australian Institute of Sport before signing with Sydney Croatia in the National Soccer League. He remained there until the close of the 1994–95 season before signing with Marconi-Fairfield. He enjoyed two seasons at Bossley Park before signing for Wollongong City FC, where he saw more regular starting appearances. Overall, his time at Wollongong was successful, playing 152 games for club and scoring seven goals. He was a part of two championship-winning squads, starting in the 1999–2000 NSL Grand Final at Subiaco Oval, Western Australia against Perth Glory. Stanton played the entire match but was one of only two Wolves players to not take a penalty in the 7–6 penalty shootout. The following year, Stanton made an appearance from the substitute bench in the 2000–01 winning grand final over South Melbourne at Parramatta Stadium, New South Wales. Stanton replaced goalscorer Sasho Petrovski in the 73rd minute with the Wolves leading, 2–0. The Wolves went on to win the championship, 2–1. He was also a part of the Oceania Club Championship-winning squad of the 2001 tournament. Stanton then dropped down to the NSW Premier League with the APIA Leichhardt Tigers for the 2003–04 season. He finished out his playing days at the Tigers before moving into coaching.

== International career ==
Stanton represented Australia at youth tournaments but never achieved full senior cap.

== Managerial career ==
Stanton began his coaching career as an assistant to his former Wollongong Wolves coach Ron Corry in the 2007 NSW Premier League season with Sutherland Sharks. Corry would leave the club in May, leaving Stanton as the caretaker for the rest of the season. In 2008, Stanton would go on to be an assistant at Penrith Nepean United and work with the Australian Deaf side. By 2009, Stanton would return to the Sharks as the senior head coach. He would make an immediate impact in his tenure, winning the Waratah Cup, Challenge Cup and the 2009 NSW Premier League Grand Final. He would continue at the club until resigning at the end of 2014 to take a position as Sydney FC Youth head coach.

== Career stats ==
=== Club ===
All-time club performance
Club	Season	League			Cup		League Cup		Continental		Total	
Club	Season	Division	App	Gls	App	Gls	App	Gls	App	Gls	App	Gls
Sydney United	1990–91	National Soccer League	23	1	1	0	?	?	–		24	1
Sydney United	1991–92	National Soccer League	23	1	1	1	?	?	–		24	2
Sydney United	1992–93	National Soccer League	23	0	3	0	?	?	–		26	0
Sydney United	1993–94	National Soccer League	28	0	5	0	?	?	–		33	0
Sydney United	1994–95	National Soccer League	27	1	2	0	?	?	–		29	1
Sydney United	Total		124	3	12	1	–	–	–	–	136	4
Marconi-Fairfield	1995–96	National Soccer League	21 (+12)	0	?	?	?	?	–		33	0
Marconi-Fairfield	1996–97	National Soccer League	18 (+6)	0	?	?	?	?	–		24	0
Marconi-Fairfield	Total		39 (+18)	0	–	–	–	–	–	–	57	0
Wollongong Wolves	1997–98	National Soccer League	25 (+1)	?	?	?	?	?	–		26	0
Wollongong Wolves	1998–99	National Soccer League	24	0	?	?	?	?	–		24	0
Wollongong Wolves	1999–00	National Soccer League	38	0	?	?	?	?	–		38	0
Wollongong Wolves	2000–01	National Soccer League	23	5	?	?	?	?	?	?	23	5
Wollongong Wolves	2001–02	National Soccer League	20	0	?	?	?	?	–		20	0
Wollongong Wolves	2002–03	National Soccer League	21	2	?	?	?	?	–		21	2
Wollongong Wolves	Total		151 (+1)	7	–	–	–	–	–	–	152	7
APIA Leichhardt	2003–04	NSW Premier League	20 (+1)	1	?	?	3	1	–		24	2
APIA Leichhardt	2004–05	NSW Premier League	?	?	?	?	?	?	–		0	0
APIA Leichhardt	2006	NSW Premier League	?	?	?	?	?	?	–		0	0
APIA Leichhardt	Total		?	?	?	?	?	?	?	?	?	?
Career totals			?	?	?	?	?	?	?	?	?	?

== Managerial statistics ==
As of match played 3 January 2026

Managerial record by team and tenure
Team	Nat	From	To	Record							
Team	Nat	From	To	G	W	D	L	GF	GA	GD	Win %
Newcastle Jets FC	(Australia)	26 June 2023	May 2025	58	17	16	25	95	75	+20	29.31
Career Total				58	17	16	25	95	75	+20	29.31

== Honours ==
=== Player ===
With Wollongong Wolves:

- (Australia) NSL Championship: 1999–2000, 2000–2001
- Oceania Club Championship: 2001

=== Manager ===
With Sutherland Sharks:

- Waratah Cup: 2009
