= Football Kingz FC league record by opponent =

Football Kingz Football Club was a New Zealand professional association football club based in Auckland. The club was formed in 1999 and joined the Australian National Soccer League in the 1999–2000 season.

Football Kingz's first team has competed in the National Soccer League and their record against each club faced in the National Soccer League is listed below. Football Kingz's first National Soccer League match was against Carlton and they met their 17th and last different opponent, Adelaide United, for the first time in the 2003–04 National Soccer League season which was also its final edition. The teams that Football Kingz played the most in league competition was Wollongong Wolves, who they first met in the 1999–2000 National Soccer League season. The 8 defeats from 10 meetings against Adelaide Force, Northern Spirit and Perth Glory was more than they have lost against any other club. Wollongong Wolves drew 7 league encounters with Football Kingz, more than any other club. Football Kingz had recorded more league victories against Marconi Fairfield than against any other club, having beaten them 5 times out of 10 attempts.

== Key ==
- The table includes results of matches played by Football Kingz in the National Soccer League.
- The name used for each opponent is the name they had when Football Kingz most recently played a league match against them.
- The columns headed "First" and "Last" contain the first and last seasons in which Football Kingz played league matches against each opponent.
- P = matches played; W = matches won; D = matches drawn; L = matches lost; Win% = percentage of total matches won
- ‡ Clubs with this background and symbol in the "Opponent" column were defunct during the club's period.

== All-time league record ==
Football Kingz FC league record by opponent
| Club | P | W | D | L | P | W | D | L | P | W | D | L | Win% | First | Last | Notes |
| Club | Home | | | | Away | | | | Total | | | | Win% | First | Last | Notes |
|---|---|---|---|---|---|---|---|---|---|---|---|---|---|---|---|---|
| Adelaide Force | 5 | 0 | 0 | 5 | 5 | 1 | 1 | 3 | 10 | 1 | 1 | 8 | 10.00 | 1999–2000 | 2002–03 | |
| Adelaide United | 1 | 0 | 0 | 1 | 1 | 0 | 0 | 1 | 2 | 0 | 0 | 2 | 0.00 | 2003–04 | 2003–04 | |
| Brisbane Strikers | 5 | 3 | 0 | 2 | 5 | 1 | 2 | 2 | 10 | 4 | 2 | 4 | 40.00 | 1999–2000 | 2003–04 | |
| Canberra Cosmos ‡ | 2 | 1 | 0 | 1 | 2 | 1 | 0 | 1 | 4 | 2 | 0 | 2 | 50.00 | 1999–2000 | 2000–01 | |
| Carlton ‡ | 2 | 1 | 0 | 1 | 2 | 1 | 1 | 0 | 4 | 2 | 1 | 1 | 50.00 | 1999–2000 | 2000–01 | (Note: Includes two matches forfeited by Carlton. The matches were awarded 3–0 victories to Football Kingz.) |
| Eastern Pride ‡ | 2 | 1 | 1 | 0 | 2 | 2 | 0 | 0 | 4 | 3 | 1 | 0 | 75.00 | 1999–2000 | 2000–01 | (Note: Record against Gippsland Falcons included.) |
| Marconi Fairfield | 5 | 4 | 1 | 0 | 5 | 1 | 0 | 4 | 10 | 5 | 1 | 4 | 50.00 | 1999–2000 | 2003–04 | |
| Melbourne Knights | 5 | 0 | 3 | 2 | 5 | 1 | 1 | 3 | 10 | 1 | 4 | 5 | 10.00 | 1999–2000 | 2003–04 | |
| Newcastle Breakers ‡ | 1 | 0 | 0 | 1 | 1 | 0 | 1 | 0 | 2 | 0 | 1 | 1 | 0.00 | 1999–2000 | 1999–2000 | |
| Newcastle United | 4 | 2 | 1 | 1 | 4 | 1 | 0 | 3 | 8 | 3 | 1 | 4 | 37.50 | 2000–01 | 2003–04 | |
| Northern Spirit | 5 | 1 | 0 | 4 | 5 | 1 | 0 | 4 | 10 | 2 | 0 | 8 | 20.00 | 1999–2000 | 2003–04 | |
| Parrmatta Power | 5 | 2 | 0 | 3 | 5 | 2 | 1 | 2 | 10 | 4 | 1 | 5 | 40.00 | 1999–2000 | 2003–04 | |
| Perth Glory | 5 | 1 | 1 | 3 | 5 | 0 | 0 | 5 | 10 | 1 | 1 | 8 | 10.00 | 1999–2000 | 2003–04 | |
| South Melbourne | 5 | 2 | 1 | 2 | 5 | 1 | 0 | 4 | 10 | 3 | 1 | 6 | 30.00 | 1999–2000 | 2003–04 | |
| Sydney Olympic | 5 | 3 | 1 | 1 | 5 | 1 | 1 | 3 | 10 | 4 | 2 | 4 | 40.00 | 1999–2000 | 2003–04 | (Note: Record against Olympic Sharks included.) |
| Sydney United | 5 | 1 | 2 | 2 | 5 | 2 | 0 | 3 | 10 | 3 | 2 | 5 | 30.00 | 1999–2000 | 2003–04 | |
| Wollongong Wolves | 6 | 1 | 4 | 1 | 6 | 1 | 3 | 2 | 12 | 2 | 7 | 3 | 16.67 | 1999–2000 | 2003–04 | |
