= 2000–01 National Soccer League =

Australian soccer season

NSL 2000–01
- League: National Soccer League
- Sport: Association football
- Duration: 2000–2001
- Number of teams: 16

NSL season
- Champions: Wollongong Wolves
- Top scorer: Sasho Petrovski (21)

National Soccer League seasons
- ← 1999–2000 2001–02 →

The 2000–01 National Soccer League season, was the 25th season of the National Soccer League in Australia.

== Regular season ==
=== League table ===
Pos	Team	Pld	W	D	L	GF	GA	GD	Pts	Qualification
1	South Melbourne	30	21	6	3	70	24	+46	69	Qualification for the Finals series
2	Wollongong Wolves (C)	30	18	7	5	80	40	+40	61	Qualification for the Finals series
3	Perth Glory	30	18	7	5	73	33	+40	61	Qualification for the Finals series
4	Sydney Olympic	30	17	6	7	58	37	+21	57	Qualification for the Finals series
5	Marconi Fairfield	30	14	8	8	42	33	+9	50	Qualification for the Finals series
6	Melbourne Knights	30	14	7	9	61	46	+15	49	Qualification for the Finals series
7	Adelaide Force	30	12	7	11	54	54	0	43	
8	Football Kingz	30	12	7	11	52	52	0	43	
9	Parramatta Power	30	13	3	14	42	44	−2	42	
10	Sydney United	30	12	6	12	46	56	−10	42	
11	Canberra Cosmos	30	11	4	15	49	55	−6	37	
12	Brisbane Strikers	30	9	8	13	52	56	−4	35	
13	Northern Spirit	30	8	8	14	39	50	−11	32	
14	Newcastle United	30	7	9	14	37	56	−19	30	
15	Eastern Pride	30	5	5	20	32	61	−29	0 (Note: Eastern Pride were stripped of all their points following a breach of regulations.)	
16	Carlton	30	0	0	30	0	90	−90	0 (Note: Carlton withdrew after eight rounds. All games against them were awarded 3–0.)	Withdrew

Source: rsssf.com
Rules for classification: 1) Points; 2) Goal difference; 3) Goals scored
(C) Champions

== Finals series ==
=== Bracket ===
Elimination Finals
6	Melbourne Knights (a)	0	2	2
3	Perth Glory	0	2	2
4	Sydney Olympic	3	2	5
5	Marconi Fairfield	1	0	1

Major/Minor semi-finals
2	Wollongong Wolves	2	2	4
1	South Melbourne	1	1	2
6	Melbourne Knights	0
4	Sydney Olympic	1

Preliminary Final
1	South Melbourne	2
4	Sydney Olympic	0

Grand Final
3 June 2001
Wollongong Wolves	2
South Melbourne	1

=== Elimination finals ===
- Melbourne Knights 0–0 : 2–2 Perth Glory
- Sydney Olympic 3–1 : 2–0 Marconi Fairfield

=== Minor semi-final ===
- Melbourne Knights 0–1 Sydney Olympic

=== Major semi-final ===
- Wollongong Wolves 2–1 : 2–1 South Melbourne

=== Preliminary final ===
- South Melbourne 2–0 Sydney Olympic

=== Grand final ===
3 June 2001
12:00 AEST

Wollongong Wolves	2 – 1	South Melbourne
Petrovski 56'; Young 57'	(report)	Anastasiadis 78'

Parramatta Stadium, Sydney
Attendance: 13,402
Referee: Eddie Lennie

WOLLONGONG WOLVES:
GK	26	(Australia) Dean Anastasiadis
DF	2	(Australia) George Sounis
DF	3	(Australia) Alvin Ceccoli	(yellow card) 79'
DF	5	(Australia) David Cervinski
MF	6	(Australia) Matt Horsley (c)
MF	7	(Australia) Paul Reid
FW	9	(Australia) Sasho Petrovski	(substituted off) 73'
FW	10	(England) Stuart Young
MF	15	(Australia) David Huxley
DF	17	(Australia) Ben Blake
MF	27	(Australia) Robbie Middleby	(substituted off) 90+1'
Substitutes:
GK	1	(Australia) Daniel Beltrame
DF	4	(Australia) Robert Stanton	(substituted in) 73'
MF	8	(England) Max Nicholson
FW	14	(Australia) Jay Lucas
MF	23	(Australia) Dino Mennillo	(substituted in) 90+1'
Manager:
(Australia) Ron Corry
Joe Marston Medal:
(Australia) Matt Horsley

SOUTH MELBOURNE:
GK	1	(Australia) Michael Petkovic
MF	2	(Australia) Steve Iosifidis		(yellow card) 36'		(substituted off) 71'
DF	3	(Australia) Fausto De Amicis	(c)		(yellow card) 89'
DF	4	(Australia) Mehmet Durakovic
MF	7	(Australia) Steve Panopoulos
FW	8	(New Zealand) Vaughan Coveny
MF	10	(Australia) Con Boutsianis
FW	13	(Australia) Andrew Vlahos
FW	14	(Australia) Vas Kalogeracos		(substituted off) 65'
DF	16	(Australia) Zeljko Susa		(substituted off) 65'
DF	25	(Australia) Simon Colosimo
Substitutes:
GK	20	(Australia) Chris Jones
MF	6	(Australia) David Clarkson
FW	9	(Australia) Paul Trimboli		(substituted in) 65'
FW	11	(Australia) John Anastasiadis		(substituted in) 71'
MF	15	(Australia) Goran Lozanovski		(substituted in) 65'
Manager:
(Australia) Mike Petersen
