= Dion Valle =

Chilean-Australian footballer (born 1977)

Personal information
- Full name: Dion Enrique Valle Robbins
- Date of birth: 22 July 1977 (age 49)
- Place of birth: Darwin, Australia
- Height: 1.87 m (6 ft 2 in)
- Position: Centre-back

Youth career
- Colo-Colo

Senior career*
Years	Team	Apps	(Gls)
1993–1995	Colo-Colo		
1997	Jacksonville Cyclones		
1999	Macarthur Rams	43	(1)
1999–2002	Perth Glory	37	(0)
2002–2003	Blacktown City Demons	24	(2)
2004–2005	Marconi Stallions		

International career
1993	Chile U17		
1995	Chile U20		
- * Club domestic league appearances and goals

Dion Enrique Valle Robbins (born 22 July 1977) is a Chilean-Australian former footballer who played as a centre-back.

== Club career ==
Valle was born in Darwin, Australia. He played in the Chilean Primera División for Colo-Colo in 1995. In January 1997, he became the first player signed by the newly formed United States A-League club Jacksonville Cyclones. He captained the club for the first quarter of the 1997 season before being released in May 1997. Back in Australia, along with Perth Glory he got two titles of the National Soccer League.

== International career ==
Valle was a member of Chile's squads for the finals of the 1993 FIFA U-17 World Championship and the 1995 FIFA World Youth Championship. In addition, he took part of Chile squad in both the 1993 South American U17 Championship and the 1995 South American U20 Championship.

== Personal life ==
Born to a Chilean father and an American mother, Valle came to Chile in 1991 at the age of 13 along with his brother, who dreamed of becoming a professional footballer.

At the same time he was a footballer, he got a degree in Building Construction in Sydney.

== Honours ==
Colo-Colo

- Chilean Primera División: 1993

Perth Glory

- National Soccer League: 1999–2000, 2001–02

Chile U17

- FIFA U-17 World Cup third place: 1993
