= Scott Chipperfield =

Australian soccer player (born 1975)

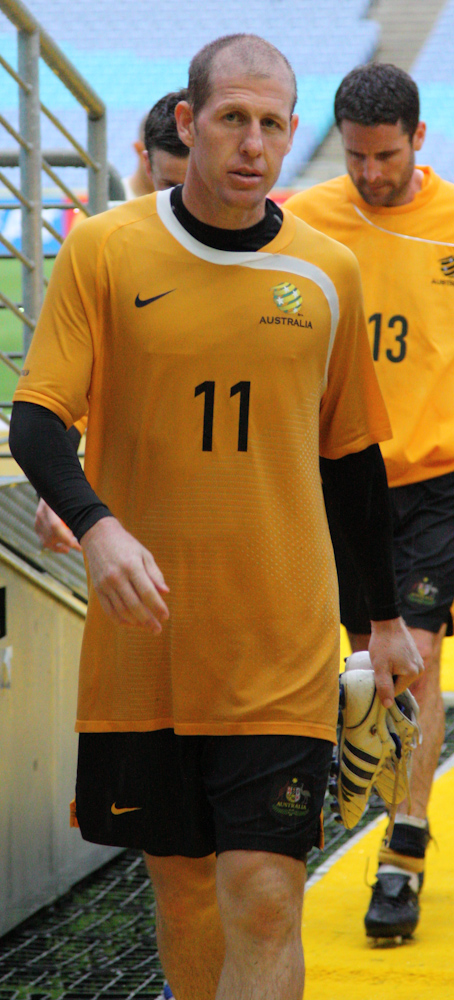
- Chipperfield with Australia

Personal information
- Full name: Scott Kenneth Chipperfield
- Date of birth: 30 December 1975 (age 50)
- Place of birth: Wollongong, Australia
- Height: 1.80 m (5 ft 11 in)
- Position: Left midfielder

Youth career
- Bellambi FC
- Tarrawanna Blueys
- Fernhill Foxes

Senior career*
Years	Team	Apps	(Gls)
1996–2001	Wollongong Wolves	131	(50)
2001–2012	Basel	269	(69)
2012	Tarrawanna Blueys		
2012–2014	FC Aesch		
2019	Bellambi FC	12	(6)

International career
1998–2010	Australia	68	(12)

Managerial career
- 2017–2018: FC United Zürich (assistant)
- 2018: FC Luzern Frauen
- 2018: Illawarra Stingrays
Medal record
Men's association football
Representing Australia
FIFA Confederations Cup
Third place	2001 Japan–South Korea
OFC Nations Cup
Winner	2000 Tahiti
Winner	2004 Australia
Runner-up	1998 Australia
Runner-up	2002 New Zealand
AFC–OFC Challenge Cup
Runner-up	2001 Japan
- * Club domestic league appearances and goals

Scott Kenneth Chipperfield (born 30 December 1975) is an Australian former soccer player who played as a midfielder for Wollongong Wolves, FC Basel, FC Aesch and the Australia national soccer team.

== Personal life ==
Chipperfield was born to Kenneth and Dale Chipperfield in Wollongong, New South Wales. He is of English descent and holds dual Australian-Swiss citizenship, having lived in Switzerland since signing for FC Basel in 2001. As a boy, Chipperfield supported Liverpool. During his playing days at Wollongong he worked as a school bus driver part-time. His son, Liam is also a professional footballer who plays for the Swiss club Basel.

== Club career ==
Chipperfield began playing soccer at the age of six with Bellambi. In 1993, he started his senior career, winning the Illawarra First Division grand final with Tarrawanna in his only year at the club. He joined Fernhill in the Illawarra Premier League in 1994. After two seasons at Fernhill, Chipperfield joined Illawarra Lions for one season in the NSW Super League.

=== Wollongong Wolves ===
Chipperfield began his professional career at Wollongong Wolves in 1996 and was a vital member of the team that won the National Soccer League twice in a row, in 2000 and 2001, and the Oceania Club Championship in 2001. He scored the winning goal in the final of the Oceania Club Championship, as Wollongong Wolves defeated Tafea of Vanuatu 1–0. He twice won the Johnny Warren Medal for the most outstanding player in the Australian domestic season and gained interest from European clubs. He had an unsuccessful trial at English First Division side Bolton Wanderers in the winter of 2000.

In early June 2001, Perth Glory announced that Chipperfield would be joining them for the 2001–02 NSL season, however he signed for FC Basel before his Wollongong Wolves contract expired at the end of the month.

=== FC Basel ===
In the summer of 2001 Chipperfield joined Swiss Super League club FC Basel. He helped Basel win the league title (their first in 22 years) and the Swiss Cup in his first season in Switzerland. The following season, he was an important member of the team as Basel reached the Second Group Stage of the 2002–03 UEFA Champions League, notching up wins against MŠK Žilina, Celtic, Spartak Moscow, Deportivo de La Coruña and Juventus on the way. In 2003, he won his second gold medal in the Swiss Cup. In the 2004 and 2005 seasons he won his second and third League Championship titles with the club.

In the summer of 2006, Chipperfield was subject to an unsuccessful bid by Charlton Athletic to obtain his services, but Basel soon announced that he had signed a three-year contract extension. At the end of this season Chipperfield played in the Cup Final in the Stade de Suisse and he received his third Cup Medal as Basel beat FC Luzern 1–0.

Chipperfield won the national Double for the second time in 2008, it was his fourth Cup title and his fourth League title. As Basel qualified for the UEFA Champions League, after a six-year absence, in 2008, Chipperfield was one of only three survivors of the squad that competed in the competition in 2003, the other two being Ivan Ergić and Benjamin Huggel. On 13 September 2008, he came on as a substitute for Orhan Mustafi during Basel's 2–0 defeat of FC Luzern at St. Jakob-Park, to make his 200th league appearance for Basel. He also scored the second goal of the match. In January 2009, he was set to sign for Hertha BSC of the German Bundesliga, but the move fell through on the advice of medical staff.

At the end of the 2009–10 season and 2009–10 Cup campaign Chipperfield achieved his third Double with the club. In April 2011 the club announced a further one-year contract extension. To that date he had played 367 competition games for the club, scoring 83 goals. At the end of the 2010–11 season Chipperfield won his sixth League Championship title.

In the 2011–12 FC Basel season Chipperfield suffered injuries and therefore only played five games in the League season 2011–12 and three in the Swiss Cup 2011–12, scoring his only goal of the season in the first round away tie against FC Eschenbach on 17 September. Chipperfields last game was in the 1:1 away draw on 11 December 2011 against Neuchâtel Xamax. At the end of the 2011–12 season he won his fourth Double, the League Championship title and the Swiss Cup with Basel.

On 18 May 2012 FC Basel announced on their homepage that the contract with Chipperfield would not be extended. At the end of their 2011–12 season Chipperfield retired from his professional career and moved to local amateur club FC Aesch as player-coach. Between the years 2001 and 2012 Chipperfield played a total of 486 games for the club scoring 106 times. 270 of these games were in the domestic league, 37 in the Cup, 78 in the European competitions and 101 were friendly games. He scored 69 goals in the domestic league, 8 in the cup, 8 in the European competitions and the other 21 were netted during the test games. He is the Basel all-time record holder of titles with the club, with seven Swiss Nationalliga A/Super League and six Swiss Cup honours.

=== FC Aesch ===
On 1 June 2012 it was announced he had signed a short-term contract to play for Illawarra Premier League club Tarrawanna Blueys FC. Nevertheless, after a few weeks a move to the Swiss club FC Aesch was revealed by various media and confirmed.

== International career ==
Chipperfield played his debut game for the Australia national team in the Suncorp Stadium, Brisbane as a substitute during the 3–1 win against Fiji on 25 September in the 1998 Oceania Nations Cup. He scored his first goal for the national team in the game against the Cook Islands just three days later, it was the eleventh goal of the game as Australia won 16–0.

He is perhaps best known in Australia for his loyal and somewhat unexpected appearance at the 2002 OFC Nations Cup in New Zealand, a tournament which was marred by the financial turmoil of the then Soccer Australia. The non-existent financial contribution meant that the Australian players had to pay their own way to get to New Zealand. Chipperfield became the only one of Australia's large Europe-based contingent to answer the call and perform for his country in their time of need.

Chipperfield was part of the team that defeated Uruguay in a playoff in November 2005 to qualify for the 2006 FIFA World Cup in Germany, and was named in Australia's final 23-man squad. At the tournament, Chipperfield played an integral role in the Australian midfield and defence; he was considered to be one of Australia's best players.

On 12 October 2009, Chipperfield announced his intention to retire from the national team immediately after the 2010 FIFA World Cup. After the final group game of the 2010 FIFA World Cup against Serbia, which Australia won 2–1, Chipperfield announced his retirement from international football.

== Style of play ==
Chipperfield's 2010 FIFA World Cup profile describes him "as a talented attacker with great physical ability and an eye for goal." He is also known for his versatility in playing in both right and left midfield and as a left sided defender.

== Career statistics ==
=== Club ===
Appearances and goals by club, season and competition
Club	Season	League (Note: National Soccer League and Swiss Super League statistics include final series/final round matches)			Cup (Note: Includes the Swiss Cup only)		Continental (Note: All appearance(s) in O-League for Wollongong or UEFA Champions League for Basel, unless where noted)		Total	
Club	Season	Division	Apps	Goals	Apps	Goals	Apps	Goals	Apps	Goals
Wollongong Wolves FC	1996–97	National Soccer League	16	4	—		—		16	4
Wollongong Wolves FC	1997–98	National Soccer League	29	13	—		—		29	13
Wollongong Wolves FC	1998–99	National Soccer League	27	3	—		—		27	3
Wollongong Wolves FC	1999–2000	National Soccer League	35	13	—		—		35	13
Wollongong Wolves FC	2000–01	National Soccer League	24	17	—		7	10	31	27
Wollongong Wolves FC	Total		131	50	—		7	10	138	60
FC Basel	2001–02	Swiss Super League	33	6	—		6 (Note: Six appearances and one goal in UEFA Intertoto Cup)	1	39	7
FC Basel	2002–03	Swiss Super League	22	3	—		7 (Note: Includes one appearance in UEFA Champions League Qualifying match)	0	29	3
FC Basel	2003–04	Swiss Super League	31	7	—		4 (Note: Four appearances in UEFA Europa League)	1	35	8
FC Basel	2004–05	Swiss Super League	26	5	—		10 (Note: Two appearances in UEFA Champions League Qualifying and eight appearances in UEFA Europa League)	0	36	5
FC Basel	2005–06	Swiss Super League	28	5	—		11 (Note: Two appearances in UEFA Champions League Qualifying, and nine appearances and one goal in UEFA Europa League)	1	39	6
FC Basel	2006–07	Swiss Super League	36	6	—		9 (Note: Two appearances in UEFA Europa League Qualifying, and five appearances and one goal in UEFA Europa League)	1	45	7
FC Basel	2007–08	Swiss Super League	16	7	—		5 (Note: Two appearances in UEFA Europa League Qualifying and three appearances in UEFA Europa League)	0	21	7
FC Basel	2008–09	Swiss Super League	25	12	—		6 (Note: Includes two appearances in UEFA Champions League Qualifying)	1	31	13
FC Basel	2009–10	Swiss Super League	26	13	1	1	7 (Note: UEFA Europa League: Includes four appearances and one goal in Qualifying)	1	34	15
FC Basel	2010–11	Swiss Super League	21	4	1	0	8 (Note: Includes three appearances and one goal in Qualifying, and one appearance and one goal in UEFA Europa League)	2	30	6
FC Basel	2011–12	Swiss Super League	6	0	1	1	5	0	12	1
FC Basel	Total		270	68	3	2	78	8	351	78
Career total			401	118	3	2	85	18	489	138

=== International ===
Appearances and goals by national team and year
National team	Year	Apps	Goals
Australia	1998	3	1
Australia	1999	0	0
Australia	2000	7	1
Australia	2001	9	4
Australia	2002	5	2
Australia	2003	3	0
Australia	2004	6	1
Australia	2005	11	2
Australia	2006	9	0
Australia	2007	2	0
Australia	2008	3	1
Australia	2009	5	0
Australia	2010	5	0
Total		68	12

Scores and results list Australia's goal tally first, score column indicates score after each Chipperfield goal.

List of international goals scored by Scott Chipperfield
No.	Date	Venue	Opponent	Score	Result	Competition
1	28 September 1998	Suncorp Stadium, Brisbane, Australia	Cook Islands	11–0	16–0	1998 OFC Nations Cup
2	3 June 2000	Stade Pater Te Hono Nui, Papeete, Tahiti	Solomon Islands	1–0	6–0	2000 OFC Nations Cup
3	28 February 2001	Estadio El Campín, Bogotá, Colombia	Colombia	2–3	2–3	Friendly
4	9 April 2001	BCU International Stadium, Coffs Harbour, Australia	Tonga	1–0	22–0	2002 FIFA World Cup qualification
5	9 April 2001	BCU International Stadium, Coffs Harbour, Australia	Tonga	20–0	22–0	2002 FIFA World Cup qualification
6	16 April 2001	BCU International Stadium, Coffs Harbour, Australia	Samoa	8–0	11–0	2002 FIFA World Cup qualification
7	8 July 2002	Ericsson Stadium, Auckland, New Zealand	New Caledonia	3–0	11–0	2002 OFC Nations Cup
8	8 July 2002	Ericsson Stadium, Auckland, New Zealand	New Caledonia	5–0	11–0	2002 OFC Nations Cup
9	31 May 2004	Hindmarsh Stadium, Adelaide, Australia	Tahiti	9–0	9–0	2004 OFC Nations Cup
10	9 February 2005	ABSA Stadium, Durban, South Africa	South Africa	1–1	1–1	Friendly
11	21 June 2005	Sydney Football Stadium, Sydney, Australia	Solomon Islands	5–0	7–0	2006 FIFA World Cup qualification
12	10 September 2008	Pakhtakor Markaziy Stadium, Tashkent, Uzbekistan	Uzbekistan	1–0	1–0	2010 FIFA World Cup qualification

== Honours ==
Wollongong Wolves

- National Soccer League: 1999–2000, 2000–01
- Oceania Club Championship: 2000–01

Basel

- Swiss Super League: 2001–02, 2003–04, 2004–05, 2007–08, 2009–10, 2010–11, 2011–12
- Swiss Cup: 2001–02, 2002–03, 2006–07, 2007–08, 2009–10, 2011–12

Australia

- FIFA Confederations Cup: 3rd place, 2001
- OFC Nations Cup: 2000, 2004; runner-up 1998, 2002
- AFC–OFC Challenge Cup: runner-up 2001

Individual

- Johnny Warren Medal: 1999–2000, 2000–01
- Joe Marston Medal: 2000
- FC Basel Player of the Season: 2003–04, 2009–10
- Football Federation Australia Hall of Fame: 2012
- FFA Team of the Decade: 2000–13
- FFA Team of the Century
