= Max Nicholson (footballer) =

English footballer (born 1971)

Personal information
- Full name: Maximillian Nicholson
- Date of birth: 3 October 1971 (age 55)
- Place of birth: Leeds, England
- Position: Left winger

Youth career
- Doncaster Rovers

Senior career*
| Years | Team | Apps | (Gls) |
| 1989–1992 | Doncaster Rovers | 27 | (2) |
| 1992–1994 | Hereford United | 63 | (7) |
| 1994 | Torquay United | 1 | (0) |
| 1994–1996 | Scunthorpe United | 51 | (5) |
| 1996–1997 | Gainsborough Trinity | | |
| 1997–1999 | Geylang United | | |
| 2000 | Woodlands Wellington FC | | |
| 2000–2001 | Wollongong Wolves FC | 14 | (0) |
| 2002–2003 | Gainsborough Trinity | | |
- * Club domestic league appearances and goals

Maximillian Nicholson (born 3 October 1971) is an English former professional footballer who played as a left winger.

== Career ==
Born in Leeds, Nicholson began his career as a trainee with Doncaster Rovers and was given his professional debut in 1989 by former Scotland captain Billy Bremner. After four years at Belle Vue he moved on to Hereford United, Torquay United and then Scunthorpe United playing in excess of 150 league games.

He played for Gainsborough Trinity before moving on to play professionally in Singapore in the S.League with former Scunthorpe team-mate Stuart Young for four years and was voted the Straits Times S League player of the year in 1997.

He played for Geylang United and Woodlands. Nicholson teamed up with Young for a third time in the National Soccer League of Australia, both playing for Wollongong Wolves FC, winning the national soccer league championship in his first season. He was used mainly as a sub as it was difficult to dislodge Australia international Scott Chipperfield, but achieved something of a cult status amongst Wolves fans. He played 14 times for the Wolves during the 2000–01 and 2001–02 NSL seasons.

In July 2002 Nicholson returned to Gainsborough Trinity.

== Controversy ==
Nicholson acted as a witness in the match fixing scandal of 2000 as, after being attacked with a hockey stick by the notorious Wilson Raj Perumal along with fellow Woodlands player Ivica Raguz, two S League players, German goalkeeper Lutz Pfannenstiel and Australian defender Mirko Jurilj were jailed for alleged fixing of matches. Nicholson had originally been arrested along with fellow British players from Geylang United, Billy Bone and Brian Bothwell.

No charges were brought against Nicholson, he actually played in the game where it was alleged he was to be paid not to play in.
