= Alvin Ceccoli =

Australian footballer (born 1974)

Personal information
- Full name: Alvin Ceccoli
- Date of birth: 5 August 1974 (age 52)
- Place of birth: Sydney, Australia
- Height: 1.78 m (5 ft 10 in)

Team information
- Current team: Cringila Lions (Head Coach)

Youth career
- APIA Leichhardt

Senior career*
Years	Team	Apps	(Gls)
1995–2002	Wollongong Wolves	156	(31)
1999	→ AEK Athens (loan)	4	(1)
2002–2004	Parramatta Power	54	(2)
2004	Dapto FC	21	(15)
2004–2005	Wollongong City	15	(6)
2005–2007	Sydney FC	43	(2)
2007	Avispa Fukuoka	34	(1)
2008	Central Coast Mariners	6	(0)
2008	Adelaide United	0	(0)
2008–2017	Kemblawarra Fury	225	(62)
2018	Wollongong United	5	(0)
2019–2020	Corrimal Rangers	35	(8)

International career
1998–2006	Australia	6	(1)

Managerial career
- 2020–2021: Corrimal Rangers (assistant coach)
- 2021–2026: Albion Park White Eagles
- 2027–: Cringila Lions
Medal record
Representing Australia
Men's Association football
OFC Nations Cup
Runner-up	1998 Australia
- * Club domestic league appearances and goals as of 23 November 2018

Alvin Ceccoli (/ˈælvɪn ˈtʃɛkoʊli/; born 5 August 1974) is an Australian former footballer who played as Defender for three A-League clubs (Sydney FC, Central Coast Mariners and Adelaide United) and was capped internationally for Australia. He currently a head coach for Cringila Lions.

== Club career ==
Alvin Ceccoli is of Sammarinese heritage. Alvin started his National Soccer League (NSL) career at Wollongong Wolves in 1995 as a 21-year-old. He played 156 matches in the National Soccer League, punctuated by a short stint in Greece with AEK Athens. He won successive NSL Championships with Wollongong in 1998/99 and 1999/2000 before joining Parramatta Power, becoming part of the losing grand final side in 2003/04.

He was one of seven players signed by Sydney FC from the defunct NSL. Ceccoli's first season at the glamour club was a rebirth for his career. Alvin not only became one of the strongest defenders in the league, but also earned his second national team cap against Bahrain in a qualifying match for the Asian Cup in 2007, as a reward for an excellent season with Sydney FC. During the second season with Sydney however, he had some disagreements with new coach Terry Butcher which soured his relationship with the club, and he sought a move elsewhere.

A transfer to Japanese second division team Avispa Fukuoka allowed him to reunite with former Sydney coach Pierre Littbarski, and was formally released by Sydney on 16 January 2007. He spent close to a year at Avispa and was released at the end of the season.

On 3 January 2008 Ceccoli signed a contract for the remainder of the A-League season with Central Coast Mariners FC as cover for Dean Heffernan, his contract running until after the 2008 Grand Final on 25 February. Ceccoli agreed on 20 January 2008 to sign with rival A-League club Adelaide United for their 2008 AFC Champions League campaign beginning in March. It would be his third A-League club in as many years, but was notably absent from Adelaide's first two ACL matches. On 20 March 2008 it was revealed he had left the club to return home to Wollongong to be close to his young family. Staying locally, he has joined Illawarra Premier League club Dandaloo FC for 2008. In 2015, he was selected in Sydney FC's team of the decade.

After leading Corrimal Rangers FC to Grand Final glory in the 2019 season of the Illawarra Premier League Ceccoli decided to retire due to ongoing injury problems. He is held in high regard in the Illawarra region as a pioneer of local football. Ceccoli now takes on an Assistant Coach role alongside Roger Jonovski at Corrimal Rangers focusing on youth development pathways.

== Career statistics ==
=== Club ===
Club	Season	League (Note: A-League statistics include final series matches)			Cup (Note: Includes the Greek Football Cup, Emperor's Cup, and FFA Cup)		Continental (Note: All appearance(s) in O-League or AFC Champions League)		Other (Note: Includes the OFC Club Championship Qualifying Tournament, A-League Pre-Season Challenge Cup, and FIFA Club World Cup)		Total	
Club	Season	Division	Apps	Goals	Apps	Goals	Apps	Goals	Apps	Goals	Apps	Goals
Wollongong Wolves	1995–96	National Soccer League	16	2	—		—		—		16	2
Wollongong Wolves	1996–97	National Soccer League	24	2	—		—		—		24	2
Wollongong Wolves	1997–98	National Soccer League	27	7	—		—		—		27	7
Wollongong Wolves	1998–99	National Soccer League	15	1	—		—		—		15	1
AEK Athens	1998–99	Alpha Ethniki	4	1	?	?	—		—		4	1
Wollongong Wolves	1999–2000	National Soccer League	27	2	—		—		—		27	2
Wollongong Wolves	2000–01	National Soccer League	24	2	—		—		—		24	2
Wollongong Wolves	2001–02	National Soccer League	23	1	—		—		—		23	1
Wollongong Wolves	Wollongong Wolves total		156	17	—		—		—		156	17
Parramatta Power	2002–03	National Soccer League	33	0	—		—		—		33	0
Parramatta Power	2003–04	National Soccer League	21	2	—		—		—		21	2
Parramatta Power	Parramatta Power total		54	2	—		—		—		54	2
Wollongong Wolves	2004–05	NSWPL	0	0	—		—		—		0	0
Sydney FC	2005–06	A-League	24	1	—		5	1	8	0	37	2
Sydney FC	2006–07	A-League	19	1	—		0	0	5	0	24	1
Sydney FC	Sydney FC total		43	2	—		5	1	13	0	61	3
Avispa Fukuoka	2007	J2 League	34	1	?	?	—		—		34	1
Central Coast Mariners	2007–08	A-League	3	0	—		—		—		3	0
Total			294	23	—		5	1	13	0	312	24

=== International ===
Australia national team
Year	Apps	Goals
1998	4	1
1999	0	0
2000	0	0
2001	0	0
2002	0	0
2003	0	0
2004	0	0
2005	0	0
2006	2	0
Total	6	1

International goals

#	Date	Venue	Opponent	Score	Result	Competition
1	28 September 1998	Suncorp Stadium, Brisbane, Australia	Cook Islands	8–0	16–0	1998 OFC Nations Cup

== Honours ==
Central Coast Mariners

- A-League Premiership: 2007–2008

Sydney FC

- A-League Championship: 2005–2006
- Oceania Club Championship: 2004–2005

Wollongong Wolves

- NSL Championship: 1999–2000, 2000–2001
- Oceania Club Championship: 2000–2001

Australia

- OFC Nations Cup: runner-up 1998
