= Fiji National Club Championship =

- Founded: 1986
- Region: Fiji
- Current champions: Labasa Northpole (2025)

The Fiji National Club Championship is a football competition in Fiji. It is played by club teams, as opposed to the Fiji Premier League which is played between district teams. The competition was first held in 1986.

It was founded in order to decide a national champion among club teams, initially using a knockout system including clubs selected by their districts. In 1987 it introduced a "pool system" and in 1992 the "zonal playoffs" were introduced.

Teams qualify for the tournament by winning the local district championships.

== Champions ==
- 1986 - Tanoa SC
- 1987 - unknown
- 1988 - unknown
- 1989 - Combine Stars
- 1990 - Ba FSC
- 1991 - Greenstars
- 1992 - Greenstars
- 1993 - Lautoka General
- 1994 - unknown
- 1995 - unknown
- 1996 - Ba FSC (Note: Also stated as Lautoka General.)
- 1997 - Ba FSC
- 1988 - Raymonds SC
- 1999 - Kiwi Sports
- 2000 - Foodtown Warriors
- 2001 - not held
- 2002 - not held
- 2003 - unknown
- 2004 - unknown
- 2005 - General Machinery
- 2006 - General Machinery
- 2007–08 - Kriz Signs Uciwai
- 2008 - Southern Forest Combine
- 2009 - Southern Forest Combine
- 2010 - 4R Electric Ltd
- 2011 - Lokia United
- 2012 - 4R Electric Ltd
- 2013 - League FC
- 2014 - Civic FC
- 2015 - 4R Electric Ltd
- 2016 - Press FC
- 2017 - Blues FC
- 2018 - Yalalevu FC
- 2019 - not held
- 2020–21 - Kasavu FC
- 2021–22 - not held
- 2022–23 - United Sangam
- 2023 - Police FC
- 2024 - Labasa Northpole
- 2025 - Labasa Northpole
