= 1999–2000 National Soccer League =

Australian soccer season

NSL 1999–2000
- League: National Soccer League
- Sport: Association football
- Duration: 1999–2000
- Number of teams: 16

NSL season
- Champions: Wollongong Wolves
- Top scorer: Damian Mori (22)

National Soccer League seasons
- ← 1998–99 2000–01 →

The 1999–2000 National Soccer League season was the 24th season of the National Soccer League in Australia.

== Overview ==
1999–2000 was the first season since a 1995–96 rebrand to be officially known as the National Soccer League after Ericsson withdrew their sponsorship shortly before the season.

The league was originally scheduled for 17 teams, however with the late withdrawal of the Southern Stars, (previously Adelaide Sharks and West Adelaide) Soccer Australia was forced to redraw fixtures less than a week out from the season. The rescheduled 34-week season saw each team play two teams four times, and the remaining teams two times.

Wollongong Wolves won the championship. Auckland Kingz and Parramatta Power entered the competition.

== Regular season ==
=== League table ===
Pos	Team	Pld	W	D	L	GF	GA	GD	Pts	Qualification
1	Perth Glory	34	19	7	8	60	42	+18	64	Qualification for the Finals series
2	Wollongong Wolves (C)	34	17	9	8	72	44	+28	60	Qualification for the Finals series and the Oceania Club Championship
3	Carlton	34	17	7	10	55	39	+16	58	Qualification for the Finals series
4	Adelaide Force	34	16	8	10	57	37	+20	56	Qualification for the Finals series
5	Sydney Olympic	34	16	7	11	56	40	+16	55	Qualification for the Finals series
6	Marconi Fairfield	34	16	7	11	53	49	+4	55	Qualification for the Finals series
7	Newcastle Breakers	34	14	9	11	44	44	0	51	
8	Auckland Kingz	34	15	5	14	57	59	−2	50	
9	Brisbane Strikers	34	13	10	11	46	40	+6	49	
10	South Melbourne	34	14	7	13	55	51	+4	49	
11	Parramatta Power	34	14	5	15	52	47	+5	47	
12	Melbourne Knights	34	13	6	15	44	57	−13	45	
13	Northern Spirit	34	11	3	20	41	58	−17	36	
14	Canberra Cosmos	34	9	9	16	44	64	−20	36	
15	Gippsland Falcons	34	7	8	19	23	49	−26	29	
16	Sydney United	34	5	5	24	19	58	−39	20	

Source: rsssf.com
Rules for classification: 1) points; 2) goal difference; 3) number of goals scored.
(C) Champions

== Finals series ==
Elimination Finals
6	Marconi Fairfield	0	0	0
3	Carlton SC	1	2	3
5	Sydney Olympic	4	2	6
4	Adelaide Force	1	1	2

Major/Minor semi-finals
21 May & 27 May 2000
2	Wollongong Wolves	1	0	1
1	Perth Glory	2	0	2
28 May 2000
3	Carlton	2
5	Sydney Olympic	1

Preliminary Final
4 June 2000
2	Wollongong Wolves	2
3	Carlton	1

Grand Final
11 June 2000
Perth Glory	3 (6)
Wollongong Wolves (p)	3 (7)

=== Grand Final ===
11 June 2000
13:30 AWST

Perth Glory	3 – 3 (a.s.d.e.t.)	Wollongong Wolves
Despotovski 20'; Milicevic 33'; Harnwell 42'	(report)	Chipperfield 56'; Horsley 69'; Reid 89'
Penalties
Trajkovski (penalty scored); Harnwell (penalty scored); Schwertz (penalty scored); Naven (penalty scored); Wehrman (penalty scored); Edgar Aldrighi (penalty missed); Edwards (penalty missed); Milicevic (penalty scored); Afkos (penalty missed)	6 – 7	(penalty scored) Young; (penalty scored) Robertson; (penalty scored) Ceccoli; (penalty scored) Pogliacomi; (penalty scored) Petrovski; (penalty missed) Horsley; (penalty missed) Mennillo; (penalty scored) Chipperfield; (penalty scored) Reid

Subiaco Oval, Perth
Attendance: 43,242
Referee: Eddie Lennie

PERTH GLORY:
GK	23	(Australia) Jason Petkovic
DF	2	(Australia) Rob Trajkovski
DF	3	(Australia) Jamie Harnwell
MF	7	(Australia) Scott Miller	(substituted off) 63'
MF	8	(Australia) Troy Halpin
FW	9	(Australia) Alistair Edwards (c)
FW	10	(Australia) Bobby Despotovski	(substituted off) 68'
MF	11	(Australia) Kasey Wehrman
MF	15	(Brazil) Edgar Aldrighi
MF	21	(Federal Republic of Yugoslavia) Ivan Ergić	(substituted off) 84'
DF	22	(Australia) Ljubo Miličević	(yellow card) 16'
Substitutes:
GK	20	(Australia) Tony Franken
FW	4	(Brazil) Aurelio Schwertz	(yellow card) 75'	(substituted in) 68'
DF	6	(England) Gareth Naven	(substituted in) 84'
MF	13	(Australia) James Afkos	(substituted in) 63'
DF	14	(Australia) Dion Valle
Manager:
(Germany) Bernd Stange

WOLLONGONG WOLVES:
GK	1	(Australia) Les Pogliacomi
DF	3	(Australia) Alvin Ceccoli
DF	4	(Australia) Robert Stanton	(yellow card) 82'
DF	5	(Australia) David Cervinski	(substituted off) 46'
MF	6	(Australia) Matt Horsley (c)
MF	7	(Australia) Paul Reid
FW	10	(England) Stuart Young
DF	11	(Australia) Scott Chipperfield		(yellow card) 90'
MF	13	(Australia) Noel Spencer	(substituted off) 46'
FW	17	(Fiji) Esala Masi	(substituted off) 66'
MF	23	(Australia) Dino Mennillo	(yellow card) 28'
Substitutes:
GK	20	(Australia) Daniel Beltrame
DF	2	(Australia) George Sounis	(substituted in) 46'
FW	14	(Australia) Sasho Petrovski	(substituted in) 66'
MF	15	(Australia) David Huxley
DF	21	(Australia) Mark Robertson	(yellow card) 106'		(substituted in) 46'
Manager:
(Australia) Nick Theodorakopoulos
Joe Marston Medal:
: (Australia) Scott Chipperfield
