= Matt Horsley =

Australian footballer

Personal information
- Full name: Matthew Horsley
- Date of birth: 9 June 1972 (age 54)
- Place of birth: Wollongong, Australia
- Height: 1.83 m (6 ft 0 in)
- Position: Right-back

Youth career
- Balgownie Rangers FC

Senior career*
Years	Team	Apps	(Gls)
1990–2001	Wollongong Wolves	202	(31)
2001–2005	Perth Glory	79	(7)
Total		281	(38)

International career
2000	Australia	1	(0)
- * Club domestic league appearances and goals

Matt Horsley (born 9 June 1972) is an Australian former professional soccer player who played as a right-back.

== Club career ==
Horsley was born in Wollongong, New South Wales, Australia. He captained the Wollongong Wolves, with whom he played from 1990 to 2001. Horsley led the Wolves to victory over Perth in the 2000 NSL Grand Final via a penalty shoot-out, despite missing his penalty shot. In Wollongong's 2001 Grand Final victory over South Melbourne he was awarded the Joe Marston Medal for best onfield. He last played for the Australian A-League club Perth Glory in 2005, which he joined in 2001. After winning a league titled with Perth Glory in 2003 (their first), he was injured in the final NSL season and missed the 2004 NSL title victory.

After leaving Perth Glory in 2005 Horsley has focused on his career as a police officer and playing in the amateur league in Perth for Beechboro Cracovia. Matt Horsley left Cracovia in 2010 and has taken the role of club captain with a developing club Caversham Athletic Football Club in Lockridge, Western Australia..In 2012 Matt Horsley started playing and coaching amateur soccer in Kalgoorlie for the Hannans Celtic soccer club.

== Honours ==
Wollongong Wolves

- National Soccer League: 1999–2000, 2000–01

Perth Glory

- National Soccer League: 2003–04

Individual

- Joe Marston Medal: 2001

Horsley earned his first and only test cap (446) playing for the Socceroos against Bulgaria in 2000. The cap was given to him during halftime of the World Cup qualifier in Perth between Australia and Bangladesh on 3 September 2015.
