= Paul Reid (soccer, born 1979) =

Australian footballer

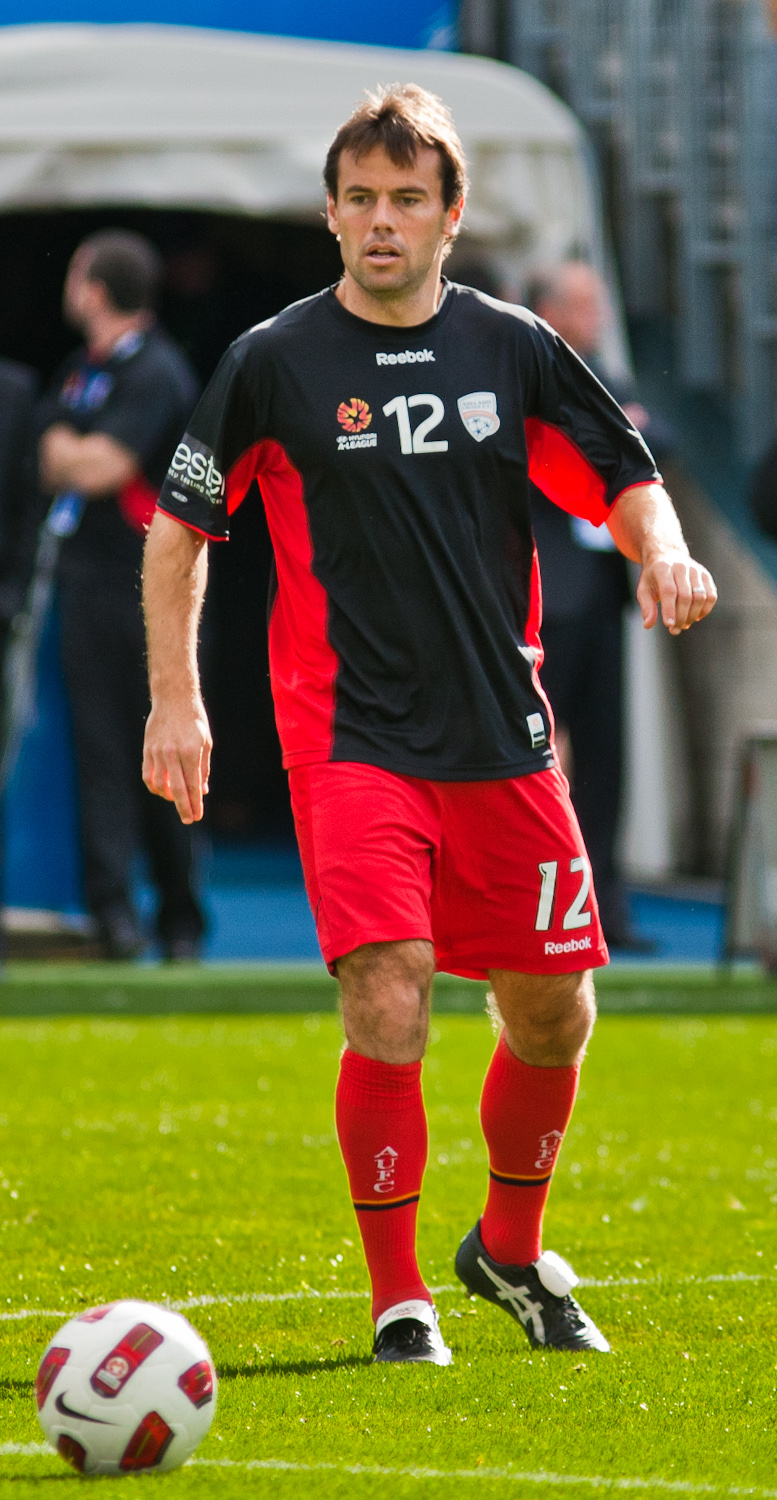
- Reid with Adelaide United in 2010

Personal information
- Full name: Paul James Reid
- Date of birth: 6 July 1979 (age 47)
- Place of birth: Sydney, Australia
- Height: 1.78 m (5 ft 10 in)
- Position: Central midfielder

Youth career
- Macarthur Rams
- 1993–1998: Marconi Stallions

Senior career*
Years	Team	Apps	(Gls)
1998	Macarthur Rams	1	(0)
1998–2002	Wollongong Wolves	96	(17)
2002–2004	Bradford City	8	(2)
2004–2008	Brighton & Hove Albion	94	(5)
2008–2011	Adelaide United	60	(3)
2012	Melbourne Heart	4	(0)
2012	Police United	2	(0)
2012	Sydney FC	11	(0)
2013–2018	Rockdale City Suns	112	(2)

International career^{‡}
1998	Australia U-20	6	(0)
2009	Australia	2	(0)

Managerial career
- 2015–2019: Rockdale City Suns (player-manager)
- 2020–: Sydney FC (assistant coach)
- * Club domestic league appearances and goals as of 5 September 2018 ‡ National team caps and goals as of 17:30, 29 October 2010 (UTC)

Paul James Reid (born 6 July 1979) is an Australian international footballer who is an assistant coach for Sydney FC in the A-league.

Reid previously played for Wollongong Wolves during championship winning seasons before moving to England where he played for six years with Bradford City and Brighton & Hove Albion before returning to Australia.

Reid has made two appearances for the Australian national team.

== Early life ==
Born in Sydney, Australia, Reid started his youth career at Marconi Stallions alongside Socceroos, Harry Kewell and Brett Emerton in the same U-13 team and was quickly noted for his talents.

== Club career ==
Reid went on to begin his senior football career in Australia for Wollongong Wolves in 1998. He became a cult hero during his time at the Wollongong Wolves after scoring the last minute equaliser in the 2000 grand final against Perth Glory. The Wolves went on to win the game 7–6 on penalties. In 2002, Reid moved to England and joined Bradford City, but only stayed for one season before joining Brighton & Hove Albion in 2003.

Reid had usually played in the right-back position in defence for the Seagulls, but the player has stated his preferred position is in the centre of midfield. Near the start of the 2006–07 season, Reid suffered a serious knee injury which saw him sidelined for nearly a year, but the player did return for the start of the 2007–08 pre-season. On 6 May 2008, it was confirmed that Reid, along with experienced trio Kerry Mayo, Gary Hart and Guy Butters were to be released from the club. On 11 July 2008, Reid began training with Hereford United in a bid to win a new contract.

=== Adelaide United ===
He was expected to sign with Perth Glory for the 2008–09 A-League season, but instead signed with Adelaide United on a two-year deal. He won a call up to the national-team squad in October 2008 along with Adelaide United teammates Scott Jamieson, Robert Cornthwaite and Eugene Galeković. Despite usually playing in a deep midfield role Reid has created a number of assists from both open play and set pieces. He scored his first goal for the club in a 1–1 draw against Wellington Phoenix at Westpac Stadium on 18 January 2009.

=== Melbourne Heart ===
Reid signed a short-term end of season contract with Melbourne Heart as injury cover during the 2012 January transfer window.

=== INSEE Police United ===
On 9 March, Reid agreed with a short-term contract with INSEE Police United. He arrived in Thailand on 11 March.

=== Sydney FC ===
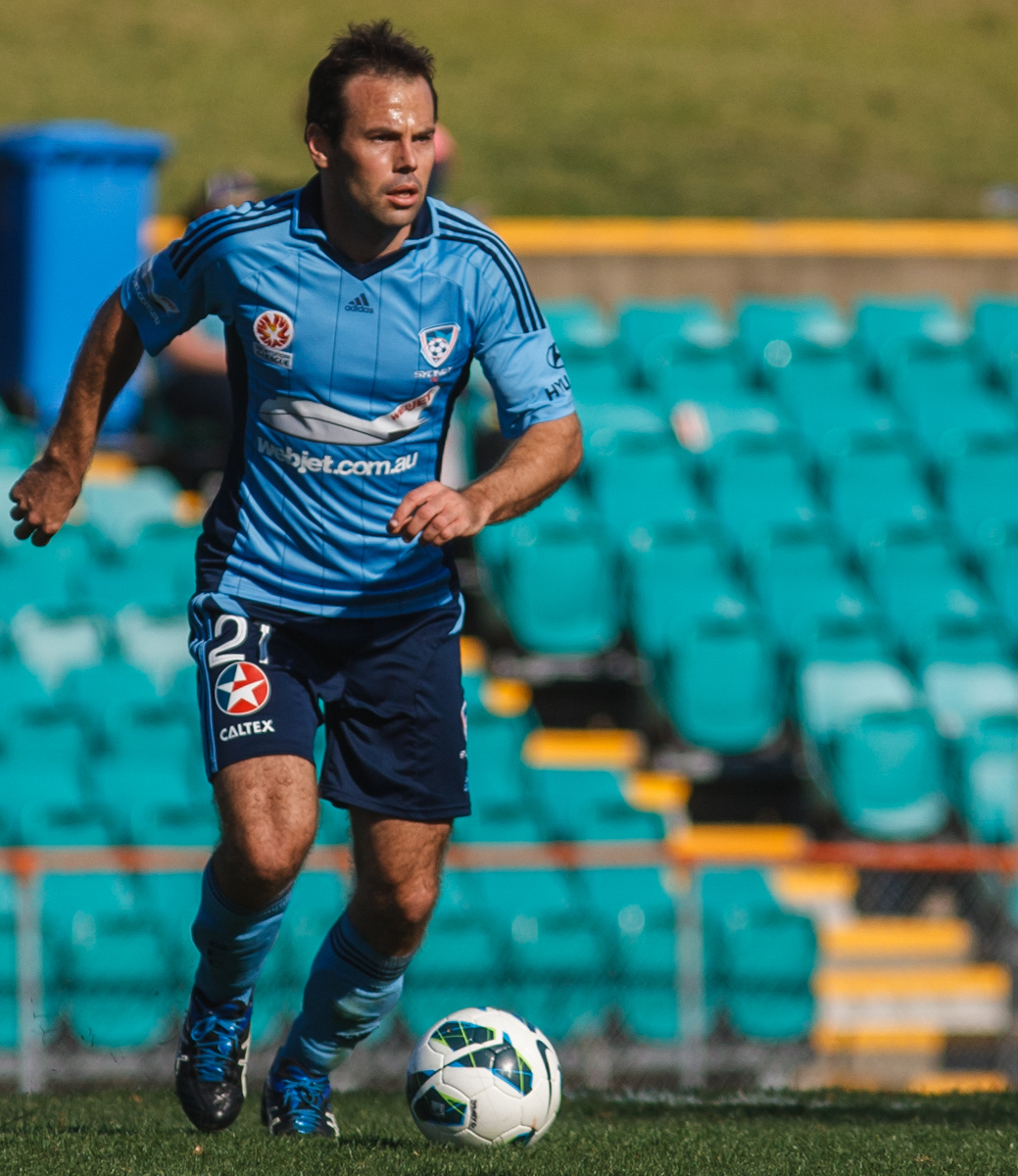
Reid playing in a pre-season game on trial with Sydney FC.

In early 2011, Reid had asked former club Adelaide United for a release to join hometown club Sydney FC for their 2011 Asian Champions League campaign, resulting in a bitter fallout between himself and then manager Rini Coolen who would not release him until season's end. In September 2012, it was announced that Reid was on trial with Sydney FC, taking part in two of their pre-season matches against A-League opposition before eventually signing a 1-year deal to join the Sky Blues beginning on 1 October 2012. However, as a result of Sydney FC failing to qualify for the A-League finals, Reid, along with teammates Nathan Sherlock, Krunoslav Lovrek, Trent McClenahan, Adam Griffiths and Jarrod Kyle were released by Sydney FC at the conclusion of the 2012-13 A-League season.

=== Rockdale City Suns ===
After being released as a player from Sydney FC, Reid signed for Rockdale City Suns in the NSW Premier League. However, he also still works for Sydney FC as a Community Football Officer.

== International career ==
Reid made his senior international debut for the Socceroos on 28 January 2009 in an AFC Asian Cup qualifying match versus Indonesia.

== Coaching career ==
Following Branko Culina departure from the managers position at Rockdale, following a poor start to the 2015 NPL, Reid was announced as Rockdale City Suns new coach, a position which he would combine with playing duty when required. Reid led Rockdale to the Round of 16 of the 2015 FFA Cup against A-League club Melbourne Victory at Jubilee Oval. Despite a valiant comeback, Melbourne would win 3-2 and go on to win the overall competition.

== Career statistics ==
Club	Season	League			Cup		Continental		Total	
Club	Season	Division	Apps	Goals	Apps	Goals	Apps	Goals	Apps	Goals
Macarthur Rams	1998	New South Wales Super League	1	0	0	0	0	0	1	0
Wollongong Wolves	1998–99	National Soccer League	22	2	0	0	0	0	22	2
Wollongong Wolves	1999–2000	National Soccer League	31	3	0	0	0	0	31	3
Wollongong Wolves	2000–01	National Soccer League	30	7	0	0	7	4	37	11
Wollongong Wolves	2001–02	National Soccer League	15	3	0	0	0	0	15	3
Wollongong Wolves	Wolves total		98	15	0	0	7	4	105	19
Bradford City	2002–03	First Division	8	2	0	0	0	0	8	2
Brighton & Hove Albion	2003–04	Second Division	5	0	0	0	0	0	5	0
Brighton & Hove Albion	2004–05	Championship	34	2	1	0	0	0	35	2
Brighton & Hove Albion	2005–06	Championship	38	2	2	0	0	0	40	2
Brighton & Hove Albion	2006–07	League One	10	1	2	1	0	0	12	2
Brighton & Hove Albion	2007–08	League One	7	0	2	0	0	0	9	0
Brighton & Hove Albion	Brighton & Hove Albion total		94	5	7	1	0	0	101	6
Adelaide United	2008–09	A-League	22	1	0	0	8	0	30	1
Adelaide United	2009–10	A-League	8	0	0	0	2	0	10	0
Adelaide United	2010–11	A-League	30	2	0	0	0	0	30	2
Adelaide United	Adelaide total		60	3	0	0	10	0	70	0
Melbourne Heart	2011–12	A-League	4	0	0	0	0	0	4	0
Police United	2012	Thai Premier League	2	0	0	0	0	0	2	0
Sydney FC	2012–13	A-League	11	0	0	0	0	0	11	0
Rockdale City Suns	2013	National Premier Leagues NSW	18	0	3	0	0	0	21	0
Rockdale City Suns	2014	National Premier Leagues NSW	23	1	1	0	0	0	24	1
Rockdale City Suns	Suns total		41	1	4	0	0	0	45	1
Career total			219	26	11	1	17	4	247	31

== Honours ==
Wollongong Wolves

- NSL Championship: 1999–2000, 2000–01
- Oceania Club Championship: 2000–01

Brighton & Hove Albion

- Football League Second Division play-offs: 2004
