= Dino Mennillo =

Australian soccer player

Personal information
- Date of birth: 22 August 1975 (age 51)
- Place of birth: Australia
- Positions: Midfielder; winger

Senior career*
Years	Team	Apps	(Gls)
1994–1999	Adelaide City	103	(16)
1999–2000	Football Kingz	15	(4)
2000	Wollongong Wolves		
2001	Walsall	0	(0)
2001–2002	Athens Kallithea	3	(0)
2002–2003	Wollongong Wolves		
Medal record
Representing Australia
Men's Association football
OFC U-20 Championship
Winner	1994 Fiji
- * Club domestic league appearances and goals

Dino Mennillo (born 22 August 1975) is an Australian retired soccer player and occupational therapist.

== Career ==
=== Soccer ===
Mennillo was a member of Australia men's national under-20 soccer team in the early 1990s. He played in the Oceania Football Confederation (OFC) under-19 Championship in Fiji in 1994 when Australia won and in the World Youth Championship in Qatar in 1995.

He started his senior career with Adelaide City in the National Soccer League (NSL) in 1994. In 1999, Mennillo moved to the Football Kingz where he played 14 matches before leaving as a result of a payment dispute in early 2000. He was signed by NSL team Wollongong Wolves. He was a member of the team that won the 2000 National Soccer League grand final against Perth Glory.

In 2001, Mennillo signed for English club Walsall, however he was released a week later without playing a match. In August 2001, he joined former Wolves coach Nick Theodorakopoulos at Athens Kallithea in the Football League Greece, where he made three appearances. Ahead of the 2002–03 National Soccer League season, Mennillo approached Adelaide City about a possible return, however the club indicated that they did not have the wage budget to afford him. He returned to Wollongong Wolves, where he ended his national league career at the end of the 2002–03 National Soccer League season. Mennillo played for MetroStars in the South Australian state league before retiring at the end of the 2004 season. He returned to MetroStars mid-way through the 2005 season.

=== Occupational therapy ===
Mennillo studied occupational therapy at the University of South Australia between 1994 and 1998; gaining a Bachelor of Applied Science (B.A.Sc.) Occupational Therapy.

In 2005 Mennillo purchased Occupational Therapy For Children (OTFC), a private practice in Adelaide. He is the Director of Clinical Services of the OTFC Group and Occupational Therapy for Children Plus (OTFC+) a facility for adolescents and young adults with Autism Spectrum Disorder.

Menillo is a paediatric Occupational Therapist. He specialises in using Jean Ayres Sensory Integration to support child development and behaviour management. In 2025, he was part of an international panel, speaking about providing Ayres Sensory Integration (ASI) in schools organised by the Collaborative for Leadership in Ayres Sensory Integration (CLASI).

The practice, OTFC received two best business awards, for Building Communities and Championing Health, for small businesses in South Australia in 2025.
