= Neil Harlock =

New Zealand footballer

Personal information
- Full name: Neil Harlock
- Date of birth: 29 May 1975 (age 51)
- Place of birth: New Zealand
- Position: Midfielder

Youth career
- Christchurch United

Senior career*
Years	Team	Apps	(Gls)
1995	North Shore United	?	(?)
1996	Waitakere City	?	(?)
1996–2000	Wollongong City	53	(3)
	Wests Illawarra	?	(?)

International career
1992	New Zealand U-20	4	(0)
1996	New Zealand U-23	3	(0)
1995–1997	New Zealand	9	(0)
- * Club domestic league appearances and goals

Neil Harlock (born 29 May 1975) is an association football player who represented New Zealand at international level.

== Career ==
Harlock's senior career began with North Shore United and Waitakere City FC before he moved to Australia to join Wollongong City in the Australian National Soccer League

He attended High School at Waitākere College.

Harlock represented New Zealand at under-20 and under-23, as well as the senior All Whites, making his debut in a 3–0 loss to Chile on 18 June 1995 and ended his international playing career with 9 A-international caps to his credit, his final cap an appearance in a 0–2 loss to Australia on 6 July 1997.
