= Nick Theodorakopoulos =

Australian soccer player and coach

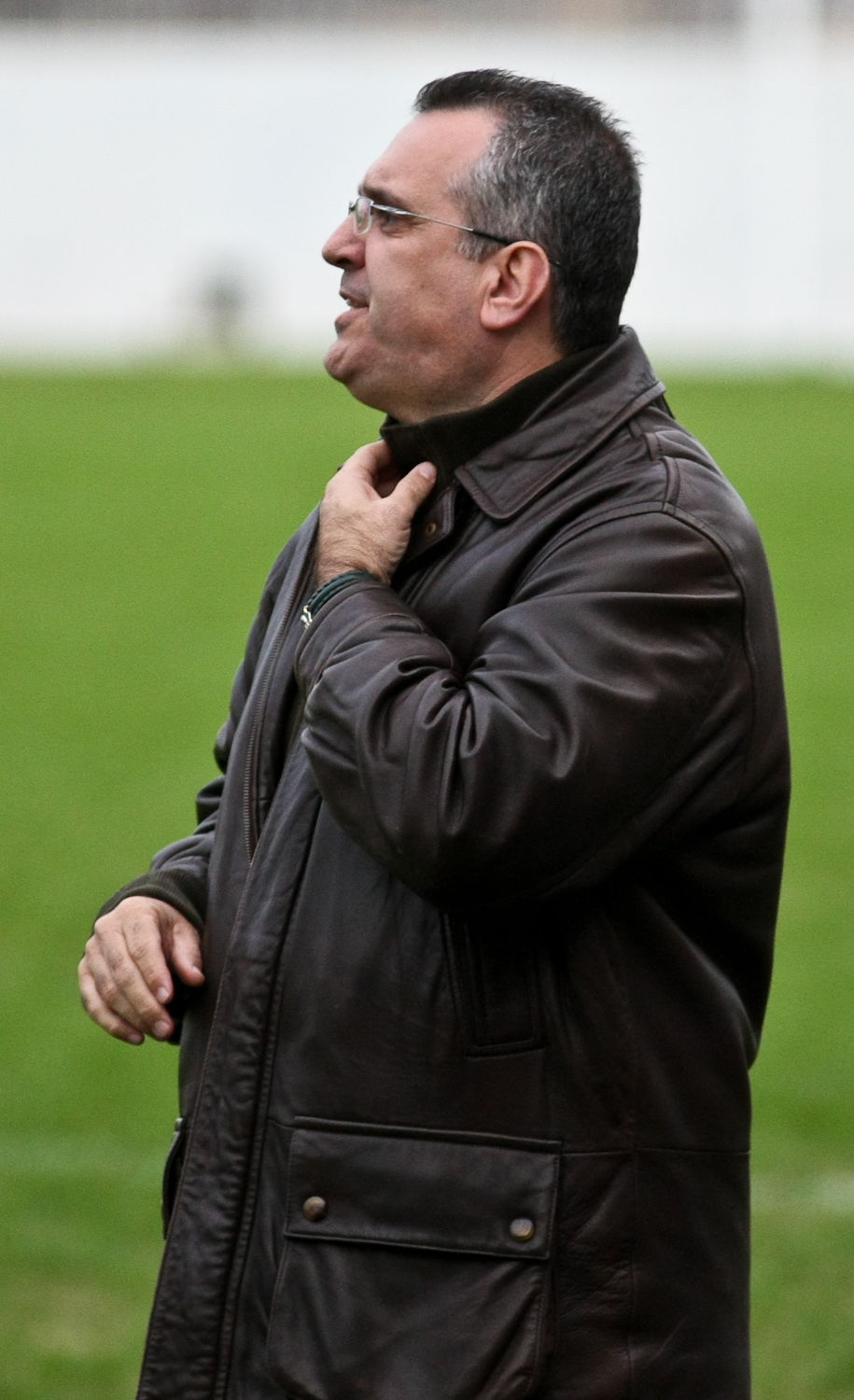
- Theodorakopoulos in 2009

Personal information
- Date of birth: 29 June 1964 (age 62)
- Place of birth: Bathurst, Australia
- Position: Forward

Senior career*
Years	Team	Apps	(Gls)
1983	Canterbury-Marrickville		
1984–1985	Sydney Olympic	30	(10)
1989–1990	APIA Leichhardt	6	(0)

Managerial career
- 1991–1994: Canterbury-Marrickville
- 1995: Belmore Hercules
- 1995–2000: Wollongong Wolves
- 2001–2002: Kallithea
- 2002–2003: Parramatta Power
- 2006–2007: Newcastle Jets
- 2009: Sydney Olympic
- * Club domestic league appearances and goals

Nick Theodorakopoulos (born 29 June 1964) is an Australian soccer coach and former player.

== Managerial career ==
Theodorakopoulos previously coached in the predecessor to the A-League, the NSL with the Wollongong Wolves and the now-defunct Parramatta Power.

His last coaching role was with the Newcastle Jets in the A-League. He had promised to deliver better football and passing game than previous coach Richard Money. However, In October 2006 after recording no wins during the Pre-Season Cup and during the first seven rounds of A-League matches, Theodorakopoulos became the first coach to be dismissed in the club's A-League's history. His assistant Gary Van Egmond was instated as the caretaker coach. On 2 April 2009, was named as the new head coach of his former club Sydney Olympic FC, he follow up of Aytek Genc and was on 5 October 2009 released.

== TV career ==
During the 2006 FIFA World Cup he was a TV analyst for SBS's coverage.

== Personal life ==
He has 2 sons, Petros Theodorakopoulos and Yianni Theodorakopoulos

== Managerial statistics ==
Team	Nat	From	To	Record				
Team	Nat	From	To	G	W	D	L	Win %
Newcastle Jets FC	(Australia)	2006	2006	7	0	3	4	0.00
Total				7	0	3	4	0.00
