= Stuart Young (footballer) =

English footballer

Personal information
- Date of birth: 16 December 1972 (age 53)
- Place of birth: Hull, England
- Height: 1.83 m (6 ft 0 in)
- Position: Striker

Youth career
- 1989–1990: Arsenal

Senior career*
Years	Team	Apps	(Gls)
1990–1991	Arsenal	0	(0)
1991–1992	Hull City	15	(2)
1993	Northampton Town	7	(2)
1993–1994	Scarborough	37	(12)
1994–1996	Scunthorpe United	19	(3)
1997	Woodlands Wellington	21	(9)
1998	Home United	12	(15)
1999–2004	Wollongong Wolves	129	(60)
2005–2007	Perth Glory	22	(5)
2007–2008	Sorrento		
2008–2012	Mandurah City		
- * Club domestic league appearances and goals

Stuart Young (born 16 December 1972) is an English former professional footballer who played as a striker.

== Career ==
Young was born in Hull, Yorkshire. His senior football career began at Arsenal in 1990, before moving to his home town of Hull City in 1991. He spent two seasons at the Tigers, before spells at Northampton Town in 1993, Scarborough 1994, Scunthorpe United between 1994 and 1996, before joining Blyth Spartans.

Young then headed overseas to Singapore where he had three successful seasons. He joined S League side Woodlands Wellington from 1996 to 1997. In his last season in Singapore, he moved to Home United and finished as the league's top goal scorer scoring 22 goals. In 1999, he moved to Australian team Wollongong Wolves in the old NSL. The move proved to be a successful one for Young and he enjoyed five special years in NSW, captaining the side from 2002 to 2004 and winning two NSL Championships along the way. He is the Wollongong Wolves' all-time top scorer with 60 goals.

His move to the Perth Glory for the inaugural A-league season endured some early hiccups due to the club's then manager Steve McMahon's reluctance to play Young. It was suggested that McMahon's apathy towards him resulted from the fact that Young was not one of his signings. During the couple of occasions in which he was used by McMahon, he was substituted on late during the game and this was also indicative of McMahon's belief that his usefulness to the team was limited.

During the 2005 season, Young was offered a trial by Queensland Roar who sensed that he had been shut out at Glory, but this did not result in a position in the playing squad. However, newly appointed Glory manager, Ron Smith, had taken a far more positive outlook on Young's services, and this had resulted in increased playing time, and scored the winner in his first game under Smith.

After playing he became manager of Mandurah City in the WA State league in 2009 and left in 2011.

== Honours ==
Wollongong Wolves

- National Soccer League: 1999–2000, 2000–01

Individual

- S.League top scorer: 1998
