= David Cervinski =

Australian soccer player (1970–2019)

Personal information
- Full name: David Cervinski
- Date of birth: 8 November 1970
- Place of birth: Geelong, Victoria, Australia
- Date of death: 16 May 2019 (aged 48)

Youth career
- North Geelong Warriors

Senior career*
| Years | Team | Apps | (Gls) |
| 1993–1995 | Melbourne Knights | 23 | (3) |
| 1995 | North Geelong Warriors | | |
| 1995–1997 | Melbourne Knights | 49 | (3) |
| 1997–1999 | Carlton | 47 | (4) |
| 1999 | Gombak United | | |
| 1999–2003 | Wollongong Wolves | 100 | (3) |
| 2003 | Cringila | | |
| 2003–2004 | Canterbury-Marrickville | 8 | (1) |
| 2003–2004 | Cringila | | |
| 2004–2007 | North Geelong Warriors | | |
- * Club domestic league appearances and goals

David Cervinski (8 November 1970 – 16 May 2019) was an Australian footballer who played for the Melbourne Knights, Carlton and Wollongong Wolves in the National Soccer League and for Gombak United in Singapore. Cervinski won four NSL titles, two with the Knights and two with the Wolves. In November 2017, he was honoured by presenting the Mark Viduka Medal, given to the player of the match in the FFA Cup. He was the brother of former footballer Adrian Cervinski. Cervinski died in May 2019 after a long battle with cancer.
