= Eddie Lennie =

Australian soccer referee (born 1959)

Eddie Lennie OAM JP
- Full name: Edward McGregor Lennie
- Born: 5 October 1959 (age 67); Glasgow, Scotland

Domestic
Years	League	Role
1991–2004	NSL	Referee

International
Years	League	Role
1996–2004	OFC	Referee
1996–2004	FIFA listed	Referee

Edward McGregor Lennie (born 5 October 1959) is a retired Australian association football referee. He is best known for officiating at the 1998 FIFA World Cup and the 1996 Olympic Games.

== Refereeing career ==
Lennie began refereeing in Scotland, before emigrating to Australia in 1985.

=== 1998 World Cup ===
Lennie refereed two matches at the 1998 FIFA World Cup in France.

=== National Soccer League ===
Lennie refereed 195 National Soccer League matches before retiring in 2004.

== Honours ==
- Medal of the Order of Australia: 2008
- Centenary Medal: 2006
- Football Federation Australia - Football Hall of Fame Hall of Honour Inductee: 2007
- Football Hall of Fame Western Australia Hall of Recognition Inductee: 2005.
- NSL Referee of the Year:1994/95, 1995/96
- Western Australian State League Referee of the Year: 1993, 1994, 1995, 1997

== Post-football career ==
His current occupation is the Referee Development Manager for Football West and is also an elite referees assessor for the Asian Football Confederation and FIFA.

== Political career ==
In December 2012 Lennie was preselected by WA Labor for the Western Australian Legislative Assembly seat of Scarborough. He subsequently ran for the Hamersley Ward at the City of Stirling elections in October 2013.
