= Daniel Beltrame =

Australian soccer player (born 1975)

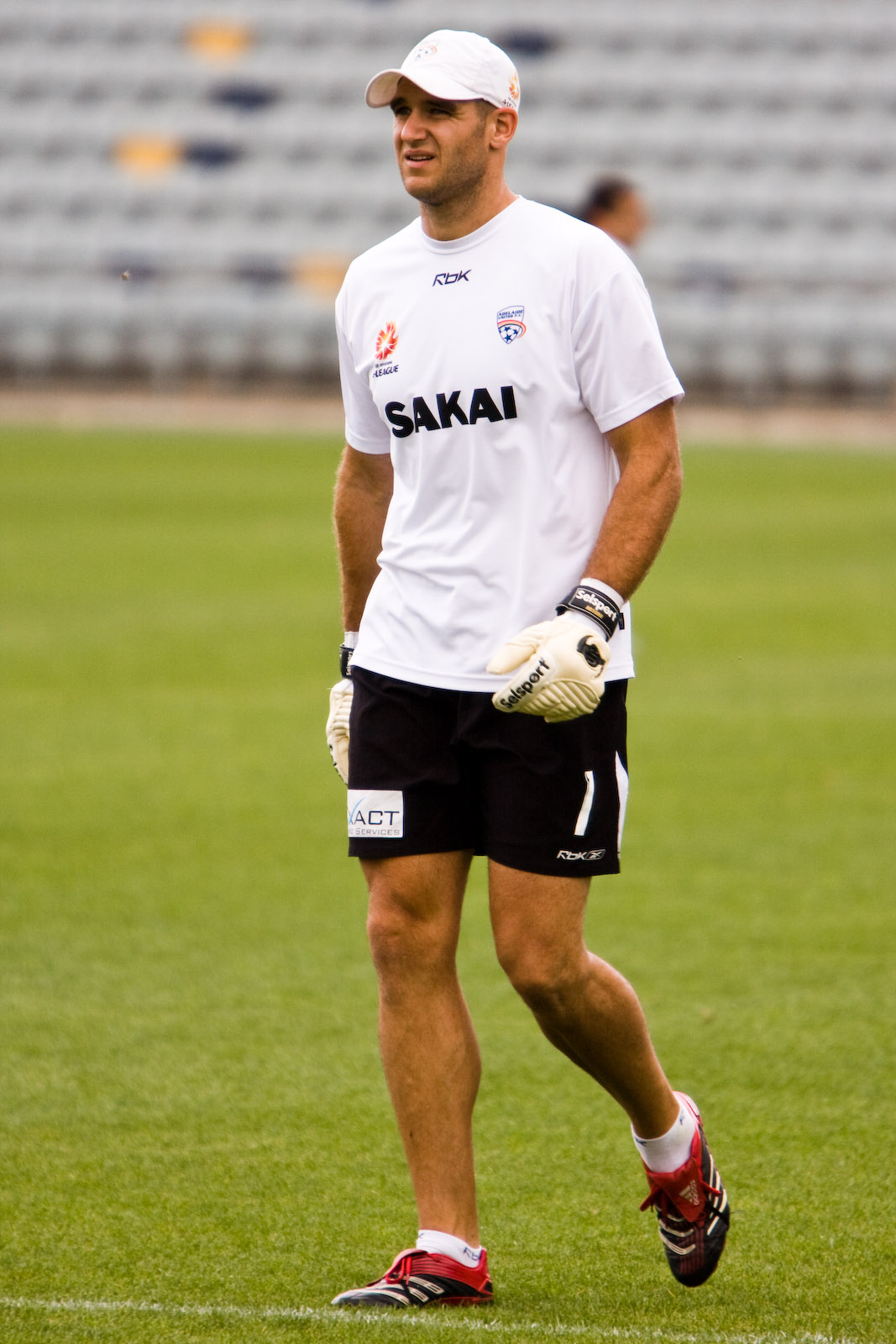

Personal information
- Full name: Daniel Beltrame
- Date of birth: 28 December 1975 (age 50)
- Place of birth: Adelaide, Australia
- Height: 1.90 m (6 ft 3 in)
- Position: Goalkeeper

Youth career
- Campbelltown City

Senior career*
Years	Team	Apps	(Gls)
1993–1994	Campbelltown City	9	(0)
1995–1997	Port Kembla	16	(0)
1997–2001	Wollongong Wolves	51	(0)
2001–2003	Newcastle United	55	(0)
2003–2004	Parramatta Power	0	(0)
2004	Corrimal Rangers	0	(0)
2004–2005	Wollongong City	31	(0)
2005–2009	Adelaide United	30	(0)
Total		137	(0)

Managerial career
- 2009–2011: North Queensland Fury (GK. Coach)
- * Club domestic league appearances and goals

Daniel Beltrame (born 28 December 1975 in Adelaide, South Australia, Australia) is an Australian former goalkeeper.

== Club career ==
His first senior semi-professional team that he played for was Campbelltown City SC in the South Australia Super League until 1994. Beltrame then relocated to New South Wales to play for Port Kembla in the Illawarra league before joining National Soccer League club Wollongong Wolves in 1997. In four seasons with the Wolves, Beltrame made just 16 starting appearances, often finding himself behind Grant Barlow, Dean Anastasiadis and Les Pogliacomi for the number one jersey as Wollongong won both the 1999–2000 and 2000–01 NSL titles. The Wolves subsequently progressed to and won the 2000–01 Oceania Club Championship. Beltrame was rotated with Barlow throughout the tournament, scoring a goal in Wollongong's 16–0 win over Lotoha'pai FC and starring in the 1–0 victory over Tafea FC which secured the title for Wollongong.

Beltrame made the switch to Newcastle United at the end of the 2000–01 season, and was regular goalkeeper for the team in 2001–02 as they became the most successful Newcastle team ever by finishing second on the ladder whilst conceding the fewest goals of any team for the year. Beltrame was nominated for NSL Goalkeeper of the Year in 2002–03 despite missing several weeks due to a shoulder injury, before transferring to Parramatta Power for 2003–04. However, he suffered a major injury prior to the start of the season, and was forced to sit out the year behind Clint Bolton as Parramatta finished as runners-up. With the end of the NSL, Beltrame played the 2004 season with the Corrimal Rangers in the Illawarra Conference League, before rejoining Wollongong to play in the New South Wales Premier League. The launch of the A-League gave Beltrame the opportunity to return to his home city, and he signed with Adelaide United FC for two seasons. In the 2005–06 season, Beltrame played 14 of Adelaide's 24 matches as the team went on to win the inaugural A-League premiership. In the preliminary final against Newcastle Jets at Hindmarsh Stadium in February 2007, he saved 2 pens from Vaughan Coveny and Stuart Musialik to give Adelaide the victory.

== Career statistics ==
(Correct as of 22 March 2011)

Club	Season	League^{1}		Cup		International^{2}		Total	
Club	Season	Apps	Goals	Apps	Goals	Apps	Goals	Apps	Goals
Adelaide United	2005–06	14	0	3	0	0	0	17	0
Adelaide United	2006–07	11	0	2	0	0	0	13	0
Adelaide United	2007–08	5	0	0	0	0	0	5	0
Total		30	0	5	0	0	0	35	0

^{1} – includes A-League final series statistics
^{2} – includes FIFA Club World Cup statistics; AFC Champions League statistics are included in the season commencing after the group stages (i.e. 2008 ACL in 2008–09 A-League season etc.)

== Honours ==
With Adelaide United:

- A-League Premiership: 2005–06

With Wollongong Wolves:

- NSL Championship: 1999–2000, 2000–2001
