= Sasho Petrovski =

Australian soccer player (born 1975)

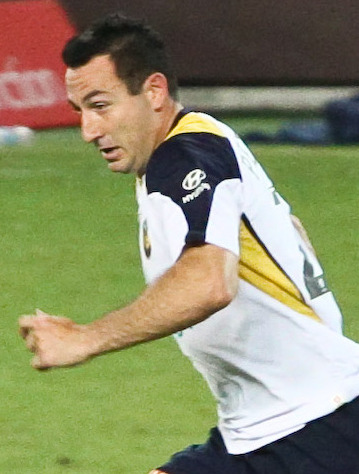
- Petrovski playing for the Central Coast Mariners in 2008

Personal information
- Date of birth: 5 March 1975 (age 51)
- Place of birth: Bankstown, Australia
- Height: 1.81 m (5 ft 11 in)
- Position: Forward

Youth career
- Sydney Macedonia

Senior career*
Years	Team	Apps	(Gls)
1993–1996	Bankstown City	25	(5)
1996–1997	Parramatta Eagles	41	(30)
1997–2001	Wollongong Wolves	69	(40)
2001–2003	Viborg FF	53	(16)
2003–2004	Parramatta Power	15	(7)
2004-2005	Bankstown City	4	(2)
2005–2007	Sydney FC	50	(20)
2007–2009	Central Coast Mariners	39	(13)
2009–2011	Newcastle Jets	45	(8)
2011–2013	South Coast Wolves	42	(14)
2013	Bankstown City	11	(10)

International career
2001–2006	Australia	2	(1)
Medal record
Representing Australia
Men's Association football
AFC–OFC Challenge Cup
Runner-up	2001 Japan
- * Club domestic league appearances and goals

Sasho Petrovski (Macedonian: Сашо Петровски, Sašo Petrovski; born 5 March 1975) is an Australian former soccer player who played as a forward. He has two caps for the Australian national team. He was known in the A-League as one of the most prolific strikers, scoring 41 goals between the 3 clubs.

== Club career ==
In the old National Soccer League, Petrovski played 94 games and scored 47 goals. He scored the second hat trick in A-League history. He played for Viborg FF in the Danish Superliga.

=== Sydney FC ===
In 2005, Petrovski returned home to play in the newly formed A-League with Sydney FC, where he scored 20 goals in 50 appearances, becoming a fan favorite. On 5 January 2007, it was announced that he would be reunited with former Sydney FC manager Pierre Littbarski at Japanese second division club Avispa Fukuoka when the current A-League finishes.

=== Central Coast Mariners ===
However, this deal fell through, due to a limit of foreign players in the squad. He then signed with the Central Coast Mariners on 12 February 2007. Petrovski achieved his first milestone for the Gosford club, when he scored his 10th goal in the 3–2 loss to his former club Sydney FC in round 2 of the 2008–09 A-League season.

=== Newcastle Jets ===
On 3 February 2009, Petrovski signed a two-year deal with rivals Newcastle Jets after he could not agree on terms for a new deal with the Mariners. He enjoyed a successful start to his time at the Jets, scoring three goals in Newcastle's ACL campaign, topping their goal scorers list. He became a fan favorite with the Newcastle faithful, with whom he had been disliked, due to his time with Sydney FC and the Central Coast Mariners.

After joining Newcastle, Petrovski became just the sixth player to reach 100 A-League games. He marked his milestone with a late winner over a Robbie Fowler led North Queensland Fury, Petrovski muscled his way through the Fury defence to put his side up 3–2, with seven minutes remaining in the match. In the 2010–11 season, Petrovski was the club's top scorer despite not starting a game all season. Petrovski left Newcastle after two seasons, after being unable to negotiate a new contract.

=== South Coast Wolves ===
It was reported that Petrovski would go on to sign with his former NSL club Wollongong Wolves, now known as South Coast Wolves in the NSW Premier League.

== International career ==
He made his international debut against Japan in 2001 and scored his first international goal in the Asian Cup qualifier between Australia and Kuwait at Sydney Football Stadium on 16 August 2006.

International goals
Goal	Date	Venue	Opponent	Score	Result	Competition
1	16 August 2006	Sydney Football Stadium (1988), Sydney, Australia	Kuwait	2–0	2–0	2007 AFC Asian Cup qualification

== Honours ==
Central Coast Mariners

- A-League Premiership: 2007–2008

Sydney FC

- A-League Championship: 2005–2006
- Oceania Club Championship: 2004–2005

Wollongong Wolves

- NSL Championship: 1999–2000, 2000–2001
- Oceania Club Championship: 2000–2001

Australia

- AFC–OFC Challenge Cup: runner-up 2001

Personal honours:

- NSL Top Scorer: 2000–2001 with Wollongong Wolves – 21 goals
