= 2003–04 Perth Glory SC season =

Perth Glory
2003–04 season
- Owner: Nick Tana
- Head coach: Mich d'Avray
- Stadium: Members Equity Stadium; Arena Joondalup; Subiaco Oval
- National Soccer League: Premier (1st)
- Finals series: Champion
- Top goalscorer: League: Damian Mori (14); All: Damian Mori (16)
- Highest home attendance: 12,624 (regular season); 17,524 (finals)
- Lowest home attendance: 6,801
Home colours

The 2003–04 Perth Glory SC season was the club's eighth season since its establishment in 1996, and its final season in the National Soccer League (NSL). Perth Glory finished top of the league and were crowned champions after defeating Parramatta Power in the 2004 NSL Grand Final.

== Review and events ==
=== Stadium ===
A redevelopment of Perth Oval, known as Member's Equity Stadium at the time, forced the Glory to play two home matches at Arena Joondalup in the northern suburbs of Perth. The unavailability of Perth Oval in the opening rounds led the Glory to play the majority of the first half of the season playing away. From the opening of the renovated stadium in round 12, Perth Glory only played four matches away until round 26. For the preliminary final, Glory used Subiaco Oval, which had hosted three previous NSL grand finals.

== Final standings ==
Pos	Team	Pld	W	D	L	GF	GA	GD	Pts	Qualification
1	Perth Glory (C)	24	18	3	3	56	22	+34	57	Qualification to Finals series
2	Parramatta Power	24	16	3	5	58	30	+28	51	Qualification to Finals series
3	Adelaide United	24	11	7	6	28	25	+3	40	Qualification to Finals series
4	Marconi Stallions	24	10	8	6	29	25	+4	38	Qualification to Finals series
5	South Melbourne	24	11	4	9	39	21	+18	37	Qualification to Finals series
6	Brisbane Strikers	24	9	5	10	28	33	−5	32	Qualification to Finals series
7	Northern Spirit	24	9	3	12	31	33	−2	30	
8	Sydney Olympic	24	7	8	9	26	31	−5	29	
9	Wollongong Wolves	24	8	5	11	34	41	−7	29	
10	Sydney United	24	7	8	9	18	25	−7	29	
11	Newcastle United	24	6	6	12	18	33	−15	24	
12	Melbourne Knights	24	6	5	13	21	41	−20	23	
13	Football Kingz	24	4	3	17	25	51	−26	15	

Source: ozfootball.net
Rules for classification: 1) Points; 2) Goal difference; 3) Goals scored;
(C) Champions

== Home and away season ==
28 September 2003 Round 2	Perth Glory	3–0	Melbourne Knights	Arena Joondalup
	Mori 82', Pondeljak 87', Caceres 88'	Report		Attendance: 9,780; Referee: Eddie Lennie

4 October 2003 Round 3	Brisbane Strikers	0–0	Perth Glory	Perry Park
		Report		Attendance: 3,042; Referee: Peter Green

12 October 2003 Round 4	Football Kingz	1–3	Perth Glory	Ericsson Stadium
	Ngata 64'	Report	Despotovski 48', Pondeljak 57', Mori 67'	Attendance: 1,245; Referee: D. Rugg

19 October 2003 Round 5	Northern Spirit	3–5	Perth Glory	Pittwater Park
	O'Sullivan 6', 34', Osman 38'	Report	Pondeljak 11', Mori 12', Despotovski 14', Hassell 43', 48'	Attendance: 2,867; Referee: Matthew Breeze

26 October 2003 Round 6	Sydney Olympic	0–2	Perth Glory	OKI Jubilee Stadium
		Report	Mori 37', 76'	Attendance: 3,383; Referee: S. Pryzdacz

2 November 2003 Round 7	Parramatta Power	6–0	Perth Glory	Parramatta Stadium
	Milicic 8', 37', 44', Buonavoglia 29', 49', Colosimo 90'	Report		Attendance: 2,639; Referee: Matthew Breeze

9 November 2003 Round 8	Perth Glory	1–0	South Melbourne	Arena Joondalup
	Despotovski 62' (pen.)	Report		Attendance: 7,356; Referee: S. Micallef

16 November 2003 Round 9	Adelaide United	1–4	Perth Glory	Hindmarsh Stadium
	Kemp 19'	Report	Pondeljak 15', 92', Mori 16', Despotovski 49'	Attendance: 13,096; Referee: Matthew Breeze

23 November 2003 Round 10	Wollongong Wolves	2–1	Perth Glory	WIN Stadium
	Young 3', Nwaogazi 54'	Report	Mori 69'	Attendance: 1,879; Referee: Peter Green

28 November 2003 Round 11	Newcastle United	1–0	Perth Glory	Energy Australia Stadium
	Masi 82'	Report		Attendance: 2,976; Referee: S. Micallef

2 February 2004 Round 12	Perth Glory	2–0	Sydney United	Perth
	Mori 20', Mrdja 81'	Report		Stadium: Members Equity Stadium; Attendance: 6,801; Referee: Matthew Breeze

10 December 2003 Round 13	Marconi Stallions	0–2	Perth Glory	Marconi Stadium
		Report	Mori 68', Despotovski 73'	Attendance: 1,851; Referee: B. Hugo

21 December 2003 Round 15	Melbourne Knights	0–2	Perth Glory	Knights Stadium
		Report	Mrdja 32', 74'	Attendance: 3,693; Referee: Mark Shield

27 December 2003 Round 16	Perth Glory	6–1	Brisbane Strikers	Perth
	Despotovski 26', Byrnes 45', Hassell 55', Caceres 74', Pondeljak 76', Mrdja 84'	Report	Brownlie 55' (pen.)	Stadium: Members Equity Stadium; Attendance: 12,142; Referee: Eddie Lennie

3 January 2004 Round 17	Perth Glory	4–0	Football Kingz	Perth
	Murphy 29', Faria 56', Mrdja 62', 78'			Stadium: Members Equity Stadium; Attendance: 9,856; Referee: C. Diomis

21 January 2004 Round 18	Perth Glory	3–2	Northern Spirit	Perth
	Murphy 9', Pondeljak 42', Despotovski 85'		Richter 25', Tomasevic 92'	Stadium: Members Equity Stadium; Attendance: 7,996; Referee: Eddie Lennie

10 January 2004 Round 19	Perth Glory	2–0	Sydney Olympic	Perth
	Murphy 76', 84'			Stadium: Members Equity Stadium; Attendance: 9,005; Referee: A. Nardi

17 January 2004 Round 20	Perth Glory	4–1	Parramatta Power	Perth
	Mrdja 18', 52', Despotovski 27' (pen.), Caceres 90'		Sekulovski 74'	Stadium: Members Equity Stadium; Attendance: 12,624; Referee: Eddie Lennie

26 January 2004 Round 21	South Melbourne	0–0	Perth Glory	Bob Jane Stadium
				Attendance: 11,642; Referee: Matthew Breeze

31 January 2004 Round 22	Perth Glory	2–0	Adelaide United	Perth
	Mori 30', 34'			Stadium: Members Equity Stadium; Attendance: 9,711; Referee: A. Nardi

7 February 2004 Round 23	Perth Glory	2–0	Wollongong Wolves	Perth
	Despotovski 33', Mori 62'			Stadium: Members Equity Stadium; Attendance: 9,233; Referee: Mark Shield

14 February 2004 Round 24	Perth Glory	2–0	Newcastle United	Perth
	Mori 27', Caceres 85'			Stadium: Members Equity Stadium; Attendance: 8,678; Referee: C. Zetter

22 February 2004 Round 25	Sydney United	2–4	Perth Glory	Sydney United Sports Centre
	Santalab 69', Heffernan 78'		Mrdja 28', 38', 92', Hassell 70'	Attendance: 3,039; Referee: C. Diomis

8 February 2004 Round 26	Perth Glory	2–2	Marconi Stallions	Perth
	Mori 83', Mrdja 86'		Spiteri 21', 76'	Stadium: Members Equity Stadium; Attendance: 10,458; Referee: Eddie Lennie

== Finals ==
13 March 2004 Major Semi Final, 1st Leg	Parramatta Power	4–2	Perth Glory	Parramatta Stadium, Sydney
	Ceccoli 9'; Petrovski 41'; Zorbas 45'; Milicic 75'	Report)	Despotovski 46'; Harnwell 56'	Attendance: 6,059; Referee: Micallef

20 March 2004 Major Semi Final, 2nd Leg	Perth Glory	0–2 (2–6 agg.)	Parramatta Power	Perth
		Report	Elrich 15'; Petrovski 65'	Stadium: Members Equity Stadium; Attendance: 14,023; Referee: Matthew Breeze

28 March 2004 Preliminary Final	Perth Glory	5–0	Adelaide United	Perth
	Despotovski 10', 81'; Mori 51', 69'; Mrdja 88'	Report		Stadium: Subiaco Oval; Attendance: 17,524; Referee: Mark Shield

4 April 2004 2004 NSL Grand Final	Parramatta Power	0–1 (a.e.t.)	Perth Glory	Sydney
15:00 AEST		Report	Mrdja 98'	Stadium: Parramatta Stadium; Attendance: 9,630; Referee: Mark Shield; Man of the Match: Ahmad Elrich

== Player details ==
Squad at end of season

No.	Pos	Nat	Player	Total		National Soccer League	
No.	Pos	Nat	Player	Apps	Goals	Apps	Goals
1	GK	(Australia) AUS	Jason Petkovic	27	0	27	0
2	DF	(Australia) AUS	Matt Horsley	9	0	9	0
3	DF	(Australia) AUS	Matthew Bingley	26	0	26	0
4	DF	(Australia) AUS	Brad Hassell	27	4	27	4
5	DF	(Australia) AUS	Shaun Murphy	28	4	28	4
6	MF	(Australia) AUS	Wayne Srhoj	13	0	13	0
7	DF	(Australia) AUS	Scott Miller	11	0	11	0
8	MF	(Australia) AUS	Anthony Danze	4	0	4	0
9	FW	(Australia) AUS	Nik Mrdja	23	14	23	14
10	FW	(Australia) AUS	Bobby Despotovski	25	12	25	12
11	FW	(Australia) AUS	Jade North	22	0	22	0
12	DF	(Australia) AUS	Mark Byrnes	24	1	24	1
14	DF	(Australia) AUS	Andrew Packer	5	0	5	0
15	MF	(Australia) AUS	Tom Pondeljak	26	7	26	7
16	FW	(Australia) AUS	Damien Mori	26	16	26	16
17	MF	(Australia) AUS	Gary Faria	18	1	18	1
18	MF	(Australia) AUS	Nick Ward	2	0	2	0
	DF	(Australia) AUS	Jamie Harnwell	12	1	12	1
20	GK	(Australia) AUS	Vince Matassa	1	0	1	0
21	MF	(Australia) AUS	Adrian Caceres	25	4	25	4
22	DF	(Australia) AUS	Dean Apelgren	1	0	1	0
	DF	(Australia) AUS	Jamie Coyne	22	0	22	0

== Transfers ==
=== Transfers in ===
Date from	Position	Name	From	Fee	Ref.
28 July 2003	DF	(Australia) Shaun Murphy	Sheffield United	Free transfer	
August 2003	FW	(Australia) Jade North	Olympic Sharks	Free transfer	
August 2003	MF	(Australia) Wayne Shroj	Olympic Sharks	Free transfer	
August 2003	MF	(Australia) Tom Pondeljak	Olympic Sharks	Free transfer	
