= List of Perth Glory FC seasons =

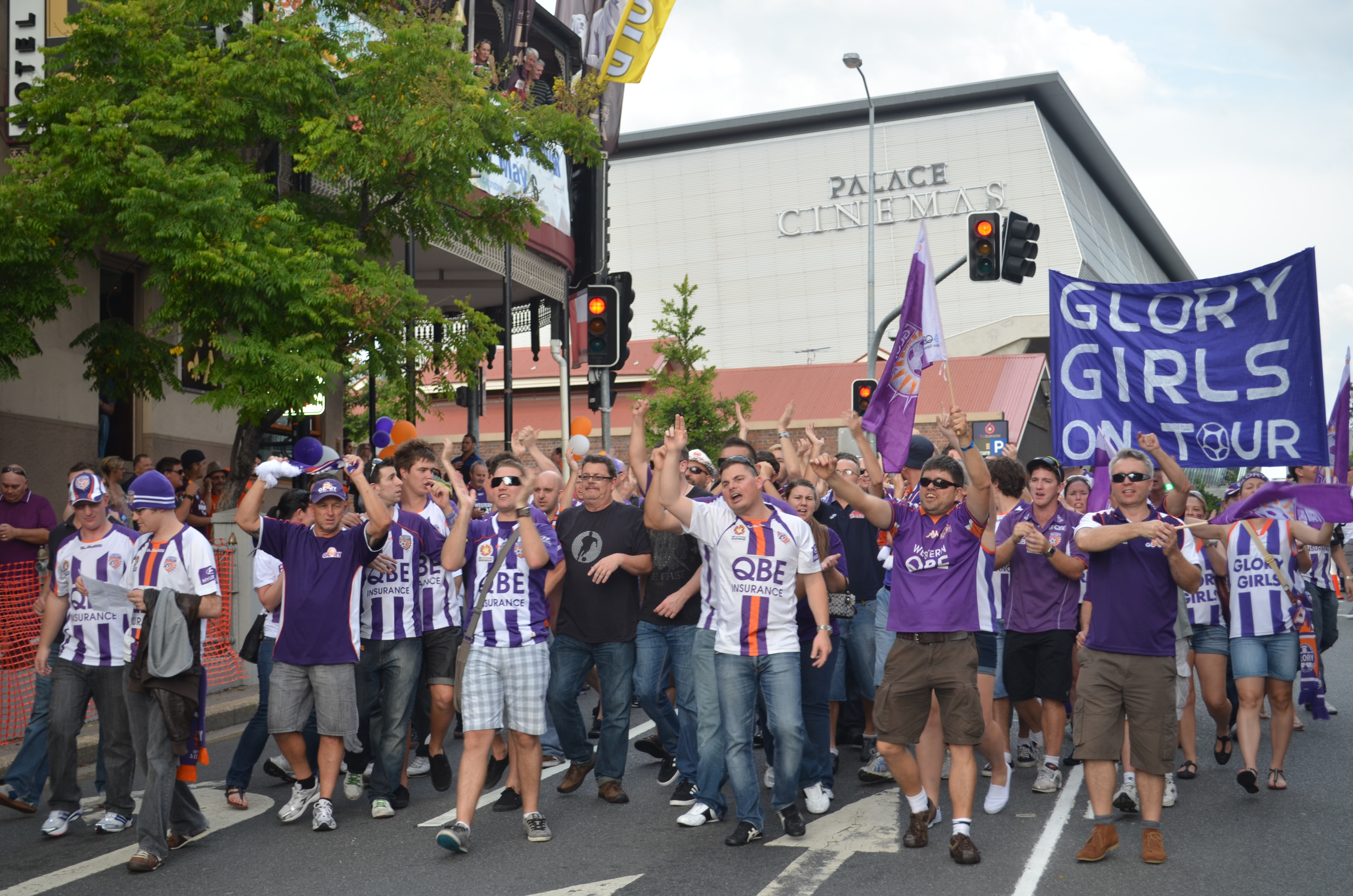
Perth Glory supporters prior to the 2012 A-League Grand Final, the club's first grand final in the A-League era

Perth Glory Football Club is an Australian professional soccer club based in Perth, Western Australia. The club was formed in 1995 and played its first competitive match in the first round of the 1996–97 National Soccer League in October 1996. They have played at their current home ground, Perth Oval, since their establishment. Perth is one of the three A-League clubs to survive the demise of the National Soccer League, the previous top division in Australian soccer. The club has participated in every A-League season since being implemented into the inaugural A-League season in 2005.

Perth has won a total of six major trophies, including the League Premiership four times and the League Championship twice. The club has also participated in six Grand Finals (Four in the National Soccer League and two in the A-League), two Australia Cup finals, two A-League Pre-Season Challenge Cup finals, and one AFC Champions League competition.

The list encompasses information about every season played by the club, including the division the club played in, the club's finishing position, placement in finals if applicable, top goalscorers, and performance in other competitions, such as the Australia Cup and the AFC Champions League, and the club's achievements in major competitions.

== Key ==
Key to league competitions:

- National Soccer League (NSL) – Australia's former top men's football league, established in 1977
- A-League Men (A-League) – Australia's top men's football league, established in 2004

Key to colours and symbols:

1st or W	Winners
2nd or RU	Runners-up
3rd	Third
	Current Season
♦	Top scorer in division

Key to league record:

- Season = The year and article of the season
- Pos = Final position
- Pld = Games played
- W = Games won
- D = Games drawn
- L = Games lost
- GF = Goals scored
- GA = Goals against
- Pts = Points

Key to cup record:

- En-dash (–) = Perth Glory did not participate or cup not held
- DNE = The club did not enter cup play
- DQ = Disqualified
- QR1 = First qualification round
- QR2 = Second qualification round, etc.
- PO = Play-off round
- Group = Group stage
- GS2 = Second group stage
- R1 = First round, etc.
- R32 = Round of 32
- R16 = Round of 16
- EF = Elimination finals
- QF = Quarter-finals
- SF = Semi-finals
- PF = Preliminary finals
- RU = Runners-up
- W = Winners

== Seasons ==
Results of league and cup competitions by season
Season	Division	Pld	W	D	L	GF	GA	Pts	Pos	Finals	Australia Cup	Competition	Result	Name(s)	Goals
Season	League									Finals	Australia Cup	Other / Asia		Top goalscorer(s) (Note: Includes goals scored in all competitions, including the A-League Men, A-League Men Finals, A-League Pre-Season Challenge Cup, Australia Cup and AFC Champions League.)	
1996–97	NSL	26	11	5	10	48	41	38	7th	—	—	NSL Cup	DNE (Note: Perth were excused from participation in the 1996–97 NSL Cup to allow them to prepare for their first NSL season.)	Bobby Despotovski	14
1997–98	NSL	26	10	6	10	35	40	36	8th	—	—	—	—	Bobby Despotovski	8
1998–99	NSL	28	16	5	7	62	37	53	3rd	PF	—	—	—	Con Boutsianis	12
1999–2000	NSL	34	19	7	8	60	42	64	1st	RU	—	—	—	Con Boutsianis Alistair Edwards	13
2000–01	NSL	30	18	7	5	73	33	61	3rd	EF	—	—	—	Damian Mori	19
2001–02	NSL	24	16	7	1	52	23	55	1st	RU	—	—	—	Damian Mori	17 ♦
2002–03	NSL	24	16	2	6	48	22	50	2nd	W	—	—	—	Damian Mori	24 ♦
2003–04	NSL	24	18	3	3	56	22	57	1st	W	—	—	—	Damian Mori	16
2004–05	Competition Not Held														
2005–06	A-League	21	8	5	8	34	29	29	5th	—	—	Pre-Season; Cup	RU	Bobby Despotovski	11 ♦ (Note: 8 goals in the league, joint top scorer with Archie Thompson of Melbourne Victory, Stewart Petrie of Central Coast Mariners and Alex Brosque of Brisbane Roar.)
2006–07	A-League	21	5	5	11	24	30	20	7th	—	—	Pre-Season; Cup	6th	Jamie Harnwell Stuart Young	7
2007–08	A-League	21	4	8	9	27	34	20	7th	—	—	Pre-Season; Cup	RU	Jamie Harnwell	8
2008–09	A-League	21	6	4	11	31	44	22	7th	—	—	Pre-Season; Cup	Group	Eugene Dadi Nikita Rukavytsya	10
2009–10	A-League	27	11	6	10	40	34	39	5th	EF	—	—	—	Mile Sterjovski	6
2010–11	A-League	30	5	8	17	27	54	23	10th	—	—	—	—	Robbie Fowler	9
2011–12	A-League	27	13	4	10	40	35	43	3rd	RU	—	—	—	Shane Smeltz	13
2012–13	A-League	27	9	5	13	29	31	32	6th	EF	—	—	—	Shane Smeltz	7
2013–14	A-League	27	7	7	13	28	37	28	8th	—	—	—	—	Steven McGarry Shane Smeltz	4
2014–15	A-League	27	14	8	5	45	35	50	7th (Note: Perth were given a compulsory 7th place finish due to salary cap violations.)	DQ (Note: Perth were disqualified from the Finals series due to salary cap violations.)	RU	—	—	Andy Keogh	17
2015–16	A-League	27	13	4	10	49	42	43	5th	EF	RU	—	—	Diego Castro	13
2016–17	A-League	27	10	9	8	53	53	39	5th	SF	R16	—	—	Diego Castro	13
2017–18	A-League	27	10	2	15	36	50	32	8th	—	R32	—	—	Adam Taggart	8
2018–19	A-League	27	18	6	3	56	23	60	1st	RU	R32	—	—	Andy Keogh	15
2019–20	A-League	26	10	7	9	43	36	37	6th	SF	R32	Champions; League	Group	Bruno Fornaroli	14
2020–21	A-League	26	9	7	10	44	44	34	9th	—	— (Note: The 2020 FFA Cup was cancelled due to the COVID-19 pandemic in Australia.)	—	—	Bruno Fornaroli	13
2021–22	A-League	26	4	6	16	20	43	18	12th	—	PO	—	—	Bruno Fornaroli	8
2022–23	A-League	26	7	8	11	36	46	26	9th	—	PO (Note: Perth played in the play-off round at the end of the 2021–22 season.)	—	—	Adam Taggart David Williams	5
2023–24	A-League	27	5	7	15	46	69	22	12th	—	PO	—	—	Adam Taggart	20 ♦
2024–25	A-League	26	4	5	17	22	56	17	13th	—	R16	—	—	Adam Taggart	12
2025–26	A-League	26	8	7	11	32	39	31	10th	—	R32	—	—	Adam Taggart	6
2026–27	A-League	TBD									R32	—	—	TBD	
