= 2002 National Soccer League grand final =

2002 National Soccer League Grand Final
- Event: 2001–02 National Soccer League
Perth Glory	Olympic Sharks
0	1
- Date: 12 May 2002
- Venue: Subiaco Oval, Perth, Western Australia
- Man of the Match: Ante Milicic (Joe Marston Medal)
- Referee: Mark Shield
- Attendance: 42,735

The 2002 National Soccer League Grand Final was held on 12 May 2002 between Perth Glory and Olympic Sharks at Subiaco Oval. Olympic Sharks won the match 1–0, with the goal coming from Ante Milicic. Milicic also won the Joe Marston Medal.

== Route to the Final ==
=== League Standings ===
Pos	Team	Pld	W	D	L	GF	GA	GD	Pts	Qualification
1	Perth Glory	24	16	7	1	52	23	+29	55	Qualification for the Finals series
2	Newcastle United	24	10	12	2	33	21	+12	42	Qualification for the Finals series
3	Olympic Sharks (C)	24	12	4	8	37	24	+13	40	Qualification for the Finals series
4	Brisbane Strikers	24	10	7	7	40	34	+6	37	Qualification for the Finals series
5	South Melbourne	24	10	6	8	30	22	+8	36	Qualification for the Finals series
6	Melbourne Knights	24	11	3	10	41	40	+1	36	Qualification for the Finals series
7	Parramatta Power	24	10	4	10	34	30	+4	34	
8	Northern Spirit	24	9	7	8	36	39	−3	34	
9	Marconi Fairfield	24	8	6	10	33	36	−3	30	
10	Wollongong Wolves	24	6	7	11	28	43	−15	25	
11	Sydney United	24	6	6	12	27	37	−10	24	
12	Adelaide Force	24	4	8	12	27	39	−12	20	
13	Football Kingz	24	3	5	16	28	58	−30	14	

Source: rsssf.com
Rules for classification: 1) Points; 2) Goal difference; 3) Goals scored
(C) Champions

=== Final Bracket ===
Elimination finals
6	Melbourne Knights	0	2	2
3	Olympic Sharks	0	6	6
5	South Melbourne	2	2	4
4	Brisbane Strikers	0	1	1

Semifinals
1	Perth Glory	4	0	4
2	Newcastle United	1	2	3
3	Olympic Sharks	2
5	South Melbourne	1

Preliminary final
2	Newcastle United	0
3	Olympic Sharks	1

Grand final
Perth Glory	0
Olympic Sharks	1

== Match ==
=== Details ===
12 May 2002
13:00 AWST

Perth Glory	0 – 1	Olympic Sharks
	Reports	Miličić 48'

Subiaco Oval, Perth
Attendance: 42,735
Referee: Mark Shield

GK	1	(Australia) Jason Petkovic
MF	2	(Australia) Matt Horsley
DF	3	(Australia) Jamie Harnwell
MF	7	(Australia) Scott Miller
FW	10	(Australia) Bobby Despotovski	(c) (yellow card) 15'
MF	12	(Australia) Bradley Hassell		(substituted off) 69'
MF	15	(Brazil) Edgar Aldrighi
FW	16	(Australia) Damian Mori
MF	17	(Australia) Gary Faria		(substituted off) 69'
DF	18	(Australia) Shane Pryce
DF	23	(Australia) David Tarka
Substitutes:
GK	30	(Australia) Vince Matassa
DF	5	(Australia) Craig Deans
DF	6	(Australia) Gareth Naven
FW	9	(Australia) Alistair Edwards		(substituted on) 69'
FW	26	(Australia) Nik Mrdja		(substituted on) 69'
Manager:
(South Africa) Mich d'Avray Joe Marston Medal: Ante Milicic (Olympic Sharks)

GK	1	(Australia) Clint Bolton
DF	4	(Australia) Paul Kohler
MF	6	(Australia) Wayne Srhoj	(yellow card) 45+1'	(substituted off) 69'
DF	7	(Australia) Lindsay Wilson
MF	8	(Australia) Tom Pondeljak
MF	11	(Australia) Jade North
MF	14	(Australia) Greg Owens		(substituted off) 88'
FW	16	(Australia) Jeromy Harris		(substituted off) 81'
FW	19	(Australia) Ante Milicic
DF	23	(Australia) Andrew Packer
DF	28	(Australia) Ante Juric (c)
Substitutes:
GK	30	(Australia) Brett Hughes
DF	2	(Australia) Stephen Laybutt		(substituted on) 88'
FW	9	(Australia) Dylan Macallister		(substituted on) 69'
FW	12	(Australia) Elias Augerinos
MF	27	(Japan) Hiroyuki Ishida		(substituted on) 81'
Manager:
(Australia) Gary Phillips

Assistant referees:
Fourth official:

Match rules

- 90 minutes
- 30 minutes of extra time if necessary.
- Penalty shoot-out if scores still level.
