= List of Parramatta Power SC seasons =

Parramatta Power Soccer Club was an Australian semi-professional association football club based in Parramatta, Sydney. The club was formed in 1999 and joined the National Soccer League in the 1999–2000 season through to the final season of the National Soccer League in the 2003–04 season.

The club's first team spent five seasons in the National Soccer League. The table details the club's achievements in major competitions, and the top scorers for each season.

== History ==
Since the foundation of Parramatta Power in 1999, they played their inaugural National Soccer League in the 1999–2000 season where they finished 11th out of 16. The next two seasons had the team miss out on the Finals series until the 2002–03 season resulted with Parramatta Power finishing 3rd qualifying for the Championship Rounds finishing in 4th. Their final season in 2003–04 resulted with the regular season and finals series finish as runners-up both to the Perth Glory.

== Key ==
Key to league competitions:

- National Soccer League (NSL) – Australia's former top football league, established in 1977 and dissolved in 2004.

Key to colours and symbols:

1st or W	Winners
2nd or RU	Runners-up
3rd	Third place
♦	Top scorer in division

Key to league record:

- Season = The year and article of the season
- Pos = Final position
- Pld = Matches played
- W = Matches won
- D = Matches drawn
- L = Matches lost
- GF = Goals scored
- GA = Goals against
- Pts = Points

== Seasons ==
Results of league and cup competitions by season
Season	Division	Pld	W	D	L	GF	GA	Pts	Pos	Finals	Name(s)	Goals
Season	League									Finals	Top goalscorer(s)	
1999–2000	NSL	34	14	5	15	52	47	47	11th	DNQ	Joel Griffiths; Mile Sterjovski	11
2000–01	NSL	28	13	3	14	42	44	42	9th	DNQ	Joe Miller	9
2001–02	NSL	24	10	4	10	34	30	34	7th	DNQ	Brett Holman	5
2002–03	NSL	24	12	4	8	51	27	40	3rd	4th	John Buonavoglia	15
2003–04	NSL	24	16	3	5	58	30	51	2nd	RU	Ante Milicic	20 ♦
