= Parramatta Power SC league record by opponent =

Parramatta Power Soccer Club was an Australian professional association football club based in Parramatta, Greater Western Sydney. The club was formed in 1999 and joined the National Soccer League in the 1999–2000 season.

Parramatta Power's first team has competed in the National Soccer League and their record against each club faced in the National Soccer League is listed below. Parramatta Power's first National Soccer League match was against Marconi-Fairfield and they met their 17th and last different opponent, Adelaide United, for the first time in the 2003–04 National Soccer League season. The team that Parramatta Power played the most in league competition was Perth Glory, who they first met in the 1999—2000 National Soccer League season; the 8 defeats from 15 meetings was more than they have lost against any other club. Adelaide City drew 5 league encounters with Parramatta Power, more than any other club. Parramatta Power had recorded more league victories against Sydney United than against any other club, having beaten them 9 times out of 12 attempts.

== Key ==
- The table includes results of matches played by Parramatta Power in the National Soccer League.
- The name used for each opponent is the name they had when Parramatta Power most recently played a league match against them.
- The columns headed "First" and "Last" contain the first and last seasons in which Parramatta Power played league matches against each opponent.
- P = matches played; W = matches won; D = matches drawn; L = matches lost; Win% = percentage of total matches won
- ‡ Clubs with this background and symbol in the "Opponent" column were defunct during the club's period.

== All-time league record ==
Parramatta Power SC league record by opponent
Club	P	W	D	L	P	W	D	L	P	W	D	L	Win%	First	Last	Notes
Club	Home				Away				Total				Win%	First	Last	Notes
Adelaide City	5	3	2	0	5	0	3	2	10	3	5	2	30.00	1999–2000	2002–03	
Adelaide United	1	0	0	1	1	1	0	0	2	1	0	1	50.00	2003–04	2003–04	
Brisbane Strikers	5	3	1	1	5	0	0	5	10	3	1	6	30.00	1999–2000	2003–04	
Canberra Cosmos ‡	2	0	0	2	2	1	0	1	4	1	0	3	25.00	1999–2000	2000–01	
Carlton ‡	2	2	0	0	2	2	0	0	4	4	0	0	100.00	1999–2000	2000–01	(Note: Includes two matches forfeited by Carlton SC. The matches were awarded 3–0 victories to Parramatta Power.)
Eastern Pride	3	2	1	0	3	1	1	1	6	3	2	1	50.00	1999–2000	2000–01	(Note: Record against Gippsland Falcons included)
Football Kingz	5	2	1	2	5	3	0	2	10	5	1	4	50.00	1999–2000	2003–04	
Marconi-Fairfield	5	2	2	1	5	3	0	2	10	5	2	3	50.00	1999–2000	2003–04	
Melbourne Knights	5	3	1	1	5	3	0	2	10	6	1	3	60.00	1999–2000	2003–04	
Newcastle Breakers ‡	1	0	0	1	1	1	0	0	2	1	0	1	50.00	1999–2000	1999–2000	
Newcastle United	5	3	1	1	5	2	2	1	10	5	3	2	50.00	2000–01	2003–04	
Northern Spirit ‡	6	4	1	1	6	2	1	3	12	6	2	4	50.00	1999–2000	2003–04	
Perth Glory	8	5	0	3	7	2	0	5	15	7	0	8	46.67	1999–2000	2003–04	
South Melbourne	5	2	1	2	5	0	1	4	10	2	2	6	20.00	1999–2000	2003–04	
Sydney Olympic	6	3	1	2	6	3	1	2	12	6	2	4	50.00	1999–2000	2003–04	
Sydney United	6	5	1	0	6	4	0	2	12	9	1	2	75.00	1999–2000	2003–04	
Wollongong City	5	3	0	2	5	0	1	4	10	3	1	6	30.00	1999–2000	2003–04	
