= Newcastle Jets FC league record by opponent =

Newcastle Jets Football Club is an Australian professional association football club based in Newcastle West, Newcastle. The club was formed in 2000 as Newcastle United before it was renamed to Newcastle Jets in 2005.

Newcastle Jets' first team have competed in the two national leagues in Australia. Their record against each club faced in the discontinued competition National Soccer League and the A-League Men is listed below. Newcastle Jets' first National Soccer League match was against Eastern Pride, and they met their 28th and most recent different league opponent, Macarthur FC, for the first time in the 2020–21 A-League season. The team that Newcastle Jets have played most in league competition is Perth Glory, who they first met in the 2000–01 season; the 34 defeats from 63 meetings is more than they have lost against any other club. Central Coast Mariners have drawn 18 league encounters with Newcastle Jets, more than any other club. Newcastle Jets have recorded more league victories against Brisbane Roar than against any other club; having beaten them 21 times out of 52 attempts.

== Key ==
- The table includes results of matches played by Newcastle Jets in the National Soccer League and A-League Men regular season and Finals series.
- The name used for each opponent is the name they had when Newcastle Jets most recently played a league match against them.
- The columns headed "First" and "Last" contain the first and most recent seasons in which Newcastle Jets played league matches against each opponent.
- P = matches played; W = matches won; D = matches drawn; L = matches lost; Win% = percentage of total matches won
- † Clubs with this background and symbol in the "Opponent" column are Newcastle Jets' divisional rivals in the current season.
- ‡ Clubs with this background and symbol in the "Opponent" column are defunct.

== All-time league record ==
Statistics correct as at match played 27 January 2023

Newcastle Jets FC league record by opponent
| Club | P | W | D | L | P | W | D | L | P | W | D | L | Win% | First | Last | Notes |
| Club | Home | | | | Away | | | | Total | | | | Win% | First | Last | Notes |
|---|---|---|---|---|---|---|---|---|---|---|---|---|---|---|---|---|
| Adelaide City | 4 | 2 | 0 | 2 | 4 | 1 | 2 | 1 | 8 | 3 | 2 | 3 | 37.50 | 2000–01 | 2002–03 | |
| Adelaide United † | 25 | 9 | 7 | 9 | 28 | 7 | 8 | 13 | 53 | 16 | 15 | 22 | 30.19 | 2003–04 | 2022–23 | |
| Brisbane Roar † | 29 | 8 | 8 | 13 | 23 | 13 | 4 | 6 | 52 | 21 | 12 | 19 | 40.38 | 2005–06 | 2022–23 | (Note: Record against Queensland Roar included) |
| Brisbane Strikers | 4 | 1 | 2 | 1 | 4 | 1 | 2 | 1 | 8 | 2 | 4 | 2 | 25.00 | 2000–01 | 2003–04 | |
| Canberra Cosmos ‡ | 1 | 1 | 0 | 0 | 1 | 0 | 0 | 1 | 2 | 1 | 0 | 1 | 50.00 | 2000–01 | 2000–01 | |
| Carlton ‡ | 1 | 1 | 0 | 0 | 1 | 1 | 0 | 0 | 2 | 2 | 0 | 0 | 100.00 | 2000–01 | 2000–01 | |
| Central Coast Mariners † | 27 | 10 | 9 | 8 | 30 | 9 | 8 | 13 | 58 | 19 | 18 | 21 | 32.76 | 2005–06 | 2022–23 | |
| Eastern Pride | 1 | 1 | 0 | 0 | 1 | 0 | 1 | 0 | 2 | 1 | 1 | 0 | 50.00 | 2000–01 | 2000–01 | |
| Football Kingz ‡ | 4 | 3 | 0 | 1 | 4 | 1 | 1 | 2 | 8 | 4 | 1 | 3 | 50.00 | 2000–01 | 2003–04 | |
| Gold Coast United | 5 | 4 | 1 | 0 | 5 | 0 | 1 | 4 | 10 | 4 | 2 | 4 | 40.00 | 2009–10 | 2011–12 | |
| Macarthur FC † | 2 | 0 | 1 | 1 | 4 | 1 | 1 | 2 | 6 | 1 | 2 | 3 | 16.67 | 2020–21 | 2022–23 | |
| Marconi Fairfield | 4 | 1 | 1 | 2 | 4 | 1 | 3 | 0 | 8 | 2 | 4 | 2 | 25.00 | 2000–01 | 2003–04 | |
| Melbourne City † | 20 | 11 | 1 | 8 | 17 | 3 | 3 | 11 | 37 | 14 | 4 | 19 | 37.84 | 2010–11 | 2022–23 | (Note: Record against Melbourne Heart included) |
| Melbourne Knights | 4 | 1 | 1 | 2 | 4 | 0 | 1 | 3 | 8 | 1 | 2 | 5 | 12.50 | 2000–01 | 2003–04 | |
| Melbourne Victory † | 24 | 10 | 7 | 7 | 26 | 9 | 3 | 14 | 50 | 19 | 10 | 21 | 38.00 | 2005–06 | 2022–23 | |
| North Queensland Fury ‡ | 3 | 3 | 0 | 0 | 3 | 2 | 0 | 1 | 6 | 5 | 0 | 1 | 83.33 | 2009–10 | 2010–11 | |
| Northern Spirit | 5 | 2 | 2 | 1 | 4 | 0 | 4 | 0 | 9 | 2 | 6 | 1 | 22.22 | 2000–01 | 2003–04 | |
| New Zealand Knights ‡ | 3 | 3 | 0 | 0 | 3 | 1 | 2 | 0 | 6 | 4 | 2 | 0 | 66.67 | 2005–06 | 2006–07 | |
| Parramatta Power ‡ | 5 | 1 | 2 | 2 | 5 | 1 | 1 | 3 | 10 | 2 | 3 | 5 | 20.00 | 2000–01 | 2003–04 | |
| Perth Glory † | 33 | 12 | 8 | 13 | 30 | 3 | 6 | 21 | 63 | 15 | 14 | 34 | 23.81 | 2000–01 | 2022–23 | |
| South Melbourne | 4 | 1 | 2 | 1 | 4 | 1 | 1 | 2 | 8 | 2 | 3 | 3 | 25.00 | 2000–01 | 2003–04 | |
| Sydney FC † | 26 | 6 | 6 | 14 | 25 | 3 | 6 | 16 | 52 | 10 | 12 | 30 | 19.23 | 2005–06 | 2022–23 | |
| Sydney Olympic | 6 | 2 | 0 | 4 | 5 | 1 | 2 | 2 | 11 | 3 | 2 | 6 | 27.27 | 2000–01 | 2003–04 | (Note: Record against Olympic Sharks included) |
| Sydney United | 4 | 2 | 2 | 0 | 4 | 1 | 1 | 2 | 8 | 3 | 3 | 2 | 37.50 | 2000–01 | 2003–04 | |
| Wellington Phoenix † | 21 | 10 | 3 | 8 | 23 | 5 | 3 | 15 | 45 | 16 | 6 | 23 | 35.56 | 2007–08 | 2022–23 | |
| Western Sydney Wanderers † | 14 | 4 | 4 | 6 | 16 | 5 | 6 | 5 | 30 | 9 | 10 | 11 | 30.00 | 2012–13 | 2022–23 | |
| Western United † | 3 | 0 | 2 | 1 | 4 | 1 | 1 | 2 | 8 | 2 | 3 | 3 | 25.00 | 2019–20 | 2022–23 | |
| Wollongong Wolves | 4 | 3 | 0 | 1 | 4 | 1 | 1 | 2 | 8 | 4 | 1 | 3 | 50.00 | 2000–01 | 2003–04 | |
