= 1999 Women's National Soccer League =

4th season of the Women's National Soccer League

Women's National Soccer League
- Season: 1999
- Dates: 25 September – 20 November 1999
- Champions: NSW Sapphires; 2nd title
- Premiers: NSW Sapphires; 1st title
- Matches: 31
- Goals: 102 (3.29 per match)
- Highest scoring: Northern NSW Pride 7–0 Victoria Vision (5 November 1999)

The 1999 Women's National Soccer League was the fourth season of the Women's National Soccer League. The season began on 25 September 1999, and concluded with the grand final on 20 November 1999. After an absence in the previous season, a Victorian club returned to the WNSL with the Vision.

SASI Pirates were the defending champions, as NSW Sapphires won their second championship in a 1–0 win over SASI Pirates in the grand final.

== Teams ==
Locations of the 1999 Women's National Soccer League
- ACTAS Canberra Eclipse
- Northern NSW Pride
- NSWIS Sapphires
- QAS Sting
- SASI Pirates
- Victoria Vision

== Regular season ==
=== League table ===
Pos	Team	Pld	W	D	L	GF	GA	GD	Pts	Qualification or relegation
1	NSWIS Sapphires (C)	10	7	2	1	26	8	+18	23	Qualification for Grand final
2	SASI Pirates	10	5	4	1	13	8	+5	19	Qualification for Grand final
3	QAS Sting	10	5	3	2	21	8	+13	18	
4	Northern NSW Horizon	10	3	2	5	18	19	−1	11	
5	ACTAS Canberra Eclipse	10	2	1	7	15	30	−15	7	
6	Victoria Vision	10	1	2	7	8	28	−20	5	

Source: OzFootball
Rules for classification: 1) points; 2) goal difference; 3) number of goals scored.
(C) Champions

=== Results ===
Home \ Away	ACT	NOR	NSW	QAS	SAS	VIC
ACTAS Canberra Eclipse		3–1	2–2	1–2	0–3	1–3
Northern NSW Pride	3–1		1–3	2–1	2–2	1–1
NSWIS Sapphires	4–1	3–0		1–0	3–0	4–1
QAS Sting	5–1	1–2	3–1		0–0	0–0
SASI Pirates	2–1	2–1	0–0	1–1		1–0
Victoria Vision	2–4	0–7	0–5	1–3	0–2	

Source: OzFootball
Legend: Blue = home team win; Yellow = draw; Red = away team win.

== Grand final ==
20 November 1999

NSW Sapphires	1–0	SASI Pirates
Alagich 18' (o.g.)	Report

Marconi Stadium, Sydney

== Awards ==
Award	Winner	Club
Julie Dolan Medal	(Australia) Ann Marie Vozzo	SASI Pirates
Golden Boot	(Australia) Belinda Dawney	Queensland Sting
Rising Star	(Australia) Ann Marie Vozzo	SASI Pirates

Ref.
