= List of Perth Glory FC players =

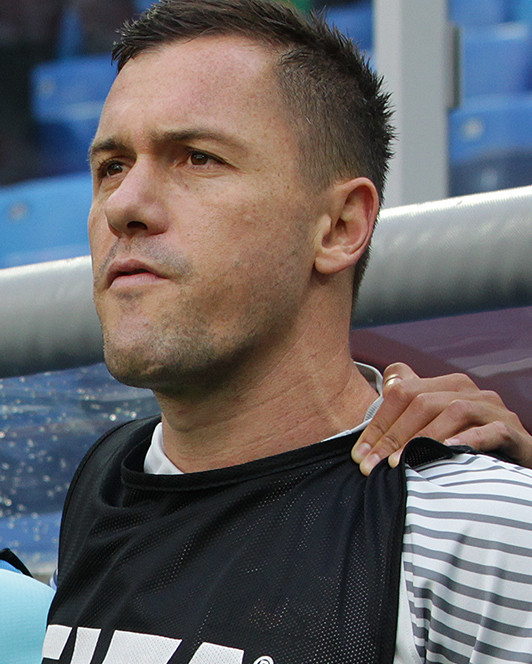
Danny Vukovic made 111 appearances with the club.

Perth Glory Football Club, an association football club based in Perth, was founded in 1996. They became the first and only Western Australian member admitted into the A-League Men in 2005, having spent their first eight seasons participating in the National Soccer League. The club's first team has competed in nationally and internationally organised competitions, and all players who have played in 100 or more such matches are listed below.

Jamie Harnwell holds the record for the greatest number of appearances for Perth Glory. Between 1998 and 2011 the Australian defender played 269 times for the club. The club's goalscoring record is held by Bobby Despotovski, who scored 116 goals in all competitions between 1996 and 2004.

== Key ==
- The list is ordered first by date of debut, and then if necessary in alphabetical order.
- Appearances as a substitute are included.
- Statistics are correct up to and including 24 July 2024. Where a player left the club permanently after this date, his statistics are updated to his date of leaving.

Positions key
GK	Goalkeeper
DF	Defender
MF	Midfielder
FW	Forward

Nationality
Unless otherwise noted, the nationality of a player is determined by the country/countries which he has played for, or if said person has not played international football, their country of birth.
Position
Playing positions are listed according to the tactical formations that were employed at the time.
Club career
Club career is defined as the first and last calendar years in which the player appeared for the club in any of the competitions listed below.
Total appearances and Total goals
Total appearances and goals comprise those in the National Soccer League, A-League Men, Australia Cup, A-League Pre-Season Challenge Cup, AFC Champions League and the 2005 Australian Club World Championship Qualifying Tournament.

== Players ==
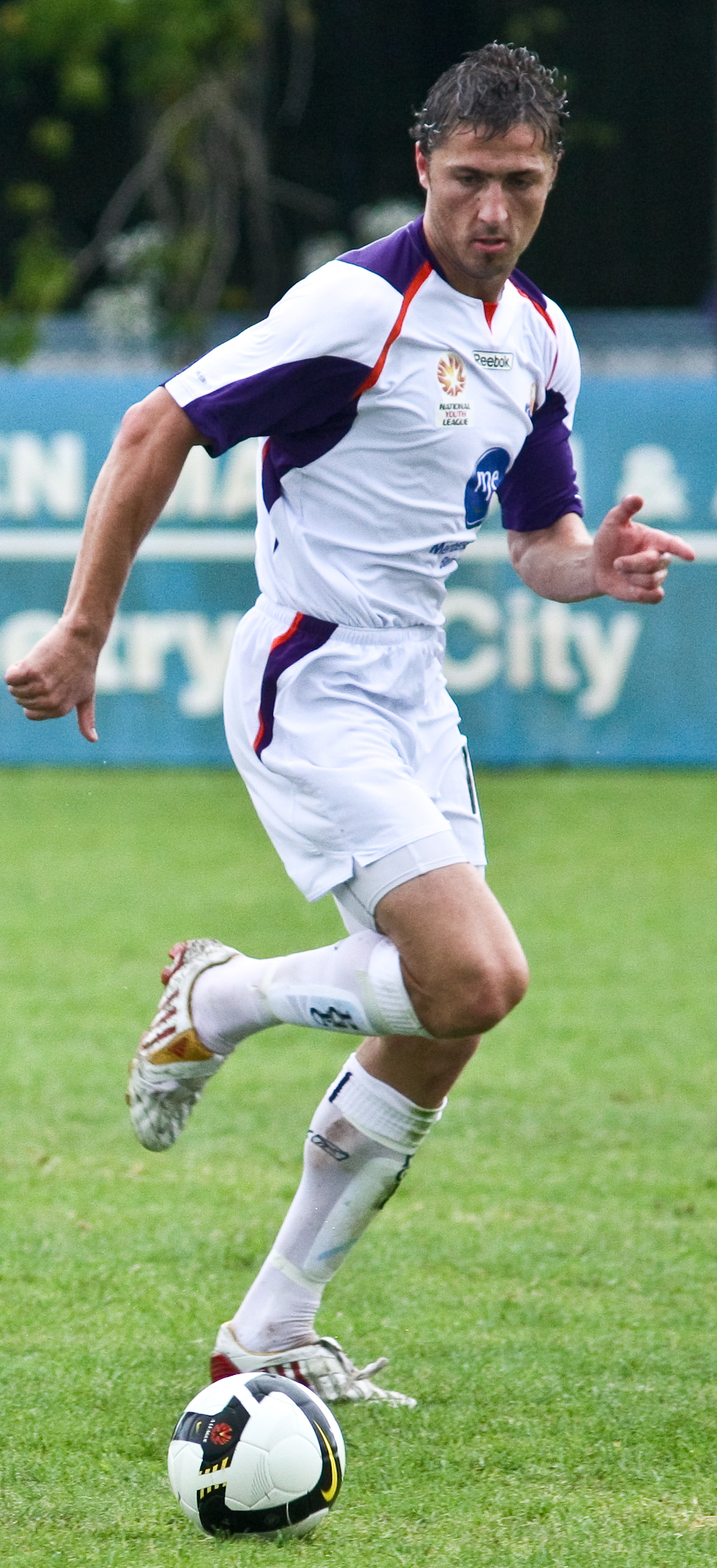
Dino Djulbic made 138 appearances over three spells with the Glory.

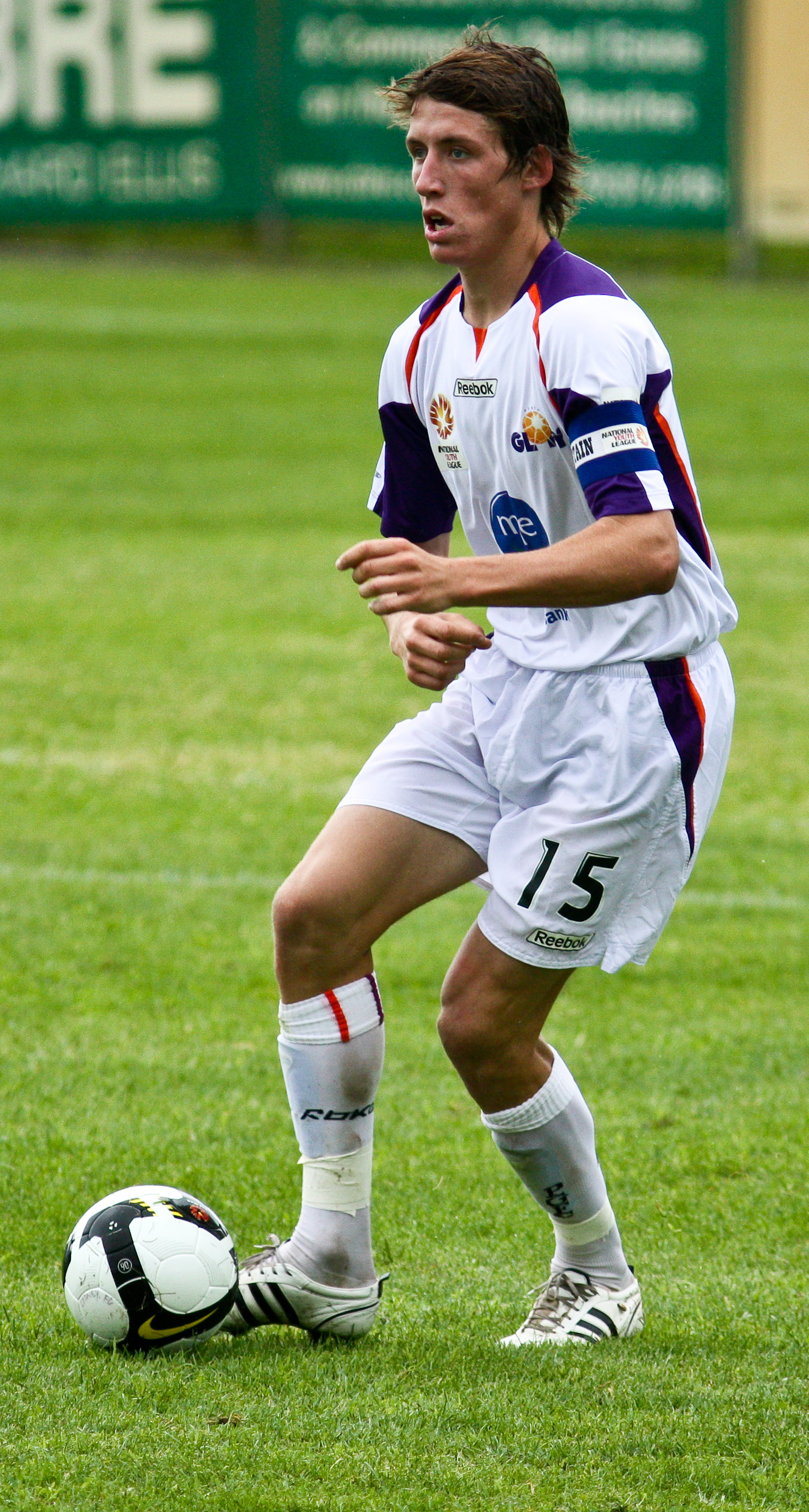
Scott Neville made 106 appearances over two spells with the club.

Players highlighted in bold are still actively playing at Perth Glory

List of Perth Glory FC players with 100 or more appearances
Player	Nationality	Pos	Club career	Starts	Subs	Total	Goals	Ref.
Player	Nationality	Pos	Club career	Appearances			Goals	Ref.
Bobby Despotovski	Australia	FW	1996–2004; 2005–2007	228	22	250	116	
Scott Miller	Australia	FW	1996–2006	233	0	233	17	
Gareth Naven	Australia	FW	1996–1999	130	13	143	5	
Jamie Harnwell	Australia	FW	1998–2011	243	26	269	46	
Jason Petkovic	Australia	GK	1999–2009	184	0	184	0	
Damian Mori	Australia	FW	2000–2006	122	7	129	84	
Jamie Coyne	Australia	DF	2002–2011	151	15	166	4	
Naum Sekulovski	Australia	DF	2005–2011	113	13	126	6	
Dino Djulbic	Australia	DF	2007–2008; 2014–2017; 2018–2019	124	14	138	6	
Scott Neville	Australia	DF	2008–2012; 2017–2019	82	24	106	6	
Jacob Burns	Australia	MF	2009–2014	113	4	117	3	
Steven McGarry	Scotland	MF	2010–2014	96	18	114	11	
**Josh Risdon**	Australia	DF	2010–2017; 2024–	151	3	154	2	
Danny Vukovic	Australia	GK	2011–2015	111	0	111	0	
Chris Harold	Australia	FW	2012–2019	107	46	153	24	
Andy Keogh	Republic of Ireland	FW	2014–2015; 2016–2019; 2020–2022	144	20	164	64	
Diego Castro	Spain	FW	2015–2021	126	20	146	49	
Liam Reddy	Australia	GK	2016–2023	163	0	163	0	
Joel Chianese	Australia	MF	2016–2020; 2021	61	41	102	18	
Darryl Lachman	Curaçao	DF	2020–2024	99	4	103	2	

== See also ==
- List of Perth Glory FC (A-League Women) players
