= Adelaide United FC league record by opponent =

Adelaide United's league record based on their opponent

Adelaide United playing in a semi-final match against Sydney FC in February 2006.

Adelaide United Football Club is a professional men's soccer club located in Adelaide, South Australia, Australia. The club was formed in 2003 and competed in the final season of the National Soccer League before its demise. It was one of the eight founding members of the A-League Men and have competed in it concurrently since its formation, under licence from the Australian Professional Leagues.

Adelaide United have competed in the first division of Australian soccer concurrently since their formation. Their record against each club faced in these competitions—the National Soccer League and the A-League Men—is listed below. Adelaide's first league match was against Brisbane Strikers, and they met their 25th and most recent different league opponent, Auckland FC, for the first time in the 2024–25 A-League Men season. The team that Adelaide have played most in league competitions is Melbourne Victory; of their 69 meetings, they have won 22, drawn 15, and lost 32, more than they have lost against any other club. Their most successful record is against Brisbane Roar, whom they have beaten 29 times in 63 meetings.

== Key ==
- The table includes results of matches played by Adelaide United in the National Soccer League and A-League Men. Matches played at a neutral venue in the last five rounds of the 2019–20 A-League and during Unite Round are excluded from the home and away records.
- The table includes results from the National Soccer League finals series and A-League Men finals series.
- The name used for each opponent is the name they had when Adelaide United most recently played a league match against them. Results against each opponent include results against that club under any former name. For example, results against Melbourne City include matches played against Melbourne Heart (2009–2014).
- The columns headed "First" and "Last" contain the first and most recent seasons in which Adelaide United played league matches against each opponent.
- Pld = matches played; W = matches won; D = matches drawn; L = matches lost; Win % = percentage of total matches won
- † Clubs with this background and symbol in the "Opponent" column are Adelaide United's divisional rivals in the current season.
- ‡ Clubs with this background and symbol in the "Opponent" column are defunct.

== All-time league record ==
Statistics correct as of the end of the 2025–26 season.

Club	Pld	W	D	L	GF	GA	Pld	W	D	L	GF	GA	Pld	W	D	L	GF	GA	Win %	First	Last	Notes
Club	Home						Away						Total						Win %	First	Last	Notes
Auckland FC †	3	0	2	1	3	6	3	0	2	1	6	7	6	0	4	2	9	13	0.00	2024–25	2025–26	
Brisbane Roar †	31	13	5	13	36	32	30	14	8	8	44	48	63	29	13	21	84	82	46.03	2005–06	2025–26	(Note: Includes record against Queensland Roar) (Note: Home and away record excludes two matches played at a neutral venue)
Brisbane Strikers	2	2	0	0	4	0	2	0	0	2	1	5	4	2	0	2	5	5	50.00	2003–04		
Central Coast Mariners †	31	15	6	10	51	47	32	11	3	18	37	49	63	26	9	28	88	96	42.62	2005–06	2025–26	
Football Kingz	1	1	0	0	1	0	1	1	0	0	3	1	2	2	0	0	4	1	100.00	2003–04		
Gold Coast United	6	2	1	3	7	11	4	1	3	0	3	2	10	3	4	3	10	13	30.00	2009–10	2011–12	
Macarthur FC †	8	4	2	2	15	11	6	1	0	5	7	17	14	5	2	7	22	28	35.71	2020–21	2025–26	
Marconi Stallions	1	1	0	0	1	0	1	0	1	0	0	0	2	1	1	0	1	0	50.00	2003–04		
Melbourne City †	25	12	8	5	49	31	21	7	5	9	27	33	47	19	14	14	78	66	40.43	2010–11	2025–26	(Note: Includes record against Melbourne Heart) (Note: Home and away record excludes a match played at a neutral venue)
Melbourne Knights	1	1	0	0	2	1	1	1	0	0	4	3	2	2	0	0	6	4	100.00	2003–04		
Melbourne Victory †	32	15	8	9	45	36	37	7	7	23	38	69	69	22	15	32	83	105	31.88	2005–06	2025–26	
New Zealand Knights ‡	3	2	1	0	6	3	3	1	1	1	3	3	6	3	2	1	9	6	50.00	2005–06	2006–07	
Newcastle Jets †	31	14	9	8	50	34	29	13	7	9	37	31	60	27	16	17	87	65	45.00	2003–04	2025–26	(Note: Includes record against Newcastle United)
North Queensland Fury ‡	3	2	1	0	13	4	3	2	0	1	6	4	6	4	1	1	19	8	66.67	2009–10	2010–11	
Northern Spirit	1	1	0	0	1	0	1	0	0	1	1	2	2	1	0	1	2	2	50.00	2003–04		
Parramatta Power ‡	1	0	0	1	0	2	1	1	0	0	2	1	2	1	0	1	2	3	50.00	2003–04		
Perth Glory †	31	16	6	9	50	44	31	9	9	13	41	54	63	26	15	22	96	101	41.27	2003–04	2025–26	
South Melbourne	2	2	0	0	4	1	1	0	0	1	1	2	3	2	0	1	5	3	66.67	2003–04		
Sydney FC †	30	11	8	11	45	50	32	10	5	17	41	52	64	22	14	28	91	106	34.38	2005–06	2025–26	
Sydney Olympic	1	0	1	0	1	1	1	0	1	0	0	0	2	0	2	0	1	1	0.00	2003–04		
Sydney United	1	0	1	0	0	0	1	0	1	0	1	1	2	0	2	0	1	1	0.00	2003–04		
Wellington Phoenix †	28	18	6	4	66	25	25	6	10	9	34	36	54	24	17	13	101	62	44.44	2007–08	2025–26	
Western Sydney Wanderers †	21	8	6	7	38	35	17	6	6	5	25	29	38	14	12	12	63	64	36.84	2012–13	2025–26	
Western United ‡	6	3	1	2	9	9	9	4	2	3	19	18	15	7	3	5	28	27	46.67	2019–20	2024–25	
Wollongong Wolves	1	0	1	0	2	2	1	1	0	0	1	0	2	1	1	0	3	2	50.00	2003–04		
Total	301	143	73	85	499	385	293	96	71	126	382	467	601	243	147	211	898	864	40.43			
