= 2003–04 National Soccer League =

Australian soccer season

- League: National Soccer League
- Sport: Soccer
- Duration: 2003–2004
- Number of teams: 13

NSL season
- Champions: Perth Glory
- Premiers: Perth Glory
- Top scorer: Ante Milicic (20)

National Soccer League seasons
- ← 2002–03 2005–06 A-League →

The 2003–04 National Soccer League season was the 28th and final season of the National Soccer League in Australia. Perth Glory were crowned both premiers and champions after winning both the league and grand final.

== Overview ==
The season was remembered as the end of an era for the national league, following the announcement in 2003 that the national competition would be wholly scrapped in response to the Crawford Report into soccer in Australia. The end of the NSL led to the formation of the A-League, a new national competition that began in 2005.

The season was played as a single league, home-and-away format with top six teams qualifying for a finals series. Adelaide City withdrew from the competition shortly before the start of the season, leading to the hasty formation of Adelaide United to take their place.

At the beginning of the season, it became obvious that the title would be fought between Perth Glory and Parramatta Power. The Champions Glory lost several of their title-winning squad, most notably their dominant midfield, most of whom to the Power. Parramatta, backed by the Leagues Club, bought big for the last year including notably Ante Milicic and Sasho Petrovski, looking to simply buy the title.

This tactic seemed to be working for a large part of the season, as Power held off major challengers Perth, including a memorable 6–0 hiding, Glory's worst-ever loss. However, a turning point came and Perth began to close the gap both in results and performance terms, and won the Premiership by 6 points in the end. Neither of these sides were ever really matched by other sides during the season. Perhaps the surprise of the season was Adelaide United, who surprised all by making the finals and nearly breaking Perth's all-time average season record attendance in the process, with the biggest crowds of the season. This was most notable as the club was thrown together just a few weeks before the season to take the place of former heavyweight Adelaide City.

In the finals series, notably Perth were comprehensively beaten in both legs of the major semi-final, while Adelaide progressed to the minor semi-final in their first ever season, only to be thrashed by Glory, just highlighting the gap between the top two sides and the rest of the league.

The last ever NSL Grand Final was held at Parramatta Stadium, due to Power winning the major semi-final. The Final was attended by a very measly crowd of just over 9,000, and played in thick rain from kick-off. Power's slick passing game was somewhat hurt by the poor conditions, and the game turned into something of a scrap. No goals were scored in 90 minutes of football, so the game went to extra-time where young Glory striker Nik Mrdja slotted to give Glory their fifth National League title and second NSL Championship, while Power finished the season with nothing to show for their quality and dominance.

== Clubs ==
Locations of the Australian 2003–04 National Soccer League clubs

Team	City	Home Ground	Capacity
Adelaide United	Adelaide	Hindmarsh Stadium	17,000
Brisbane Strikers	Brisbane	Perry Park	5,000
Football Kingz	Auckland	Ericsson Stadium	25,000
Marconi Stallions	Sydney (Fairfield)	Marconi Stadium	9,000
Melbourne Knights	Melbourne (Sunshine North)	Knights Stadium	15,000
Newcastle United	Newcastle	Energy Australia Stadium	30,000
Northern Spirit	Sydney (North Sydney)	Pittwater Park	6,000
Parramatta Power	Sydney (Parramatta)	Parramatta Stadium	21,500
Perth Glory	Perth	nib Stadium	20,500
South Melbourne	Melbourne (Albert Park)	Bob Jane Stadium	12,000
Sydney Olympic	Sydney (Belmore)	OKI Jubilee Stadium	20,500
Sydney United	Sydney (Edensor Park)	Sydney United Sports Centre	12,000
Wollongong Wolves	Wollongong	WIN Stadium	23,750

== Regular season ==
=== League table ===
Pos	Team	Pld	W	D	L	GF	GA	GD	Pts	Qualification
1	Perth Glory (C)	24	18	3	3	56	22	+34	57	Qualification to Finals series
2	Parramatta Power	24	16	3	5	58	30	+28	51	Qualification to Finals series
3	Adelaide United	24	11	7	6	28	25	+3	40	Qualification to Finals series
4	Marconi Stallions	24	10	8	6	29	25	+4	38	Qualification to Finals series
5	South Melbourne	24	11	4	9	39	21	+18	37	Qualification to Finals series
6	Brisbane Strikers	24	9	5	10	28	33	−5	32	Qualification to Finals series
7	Northern Spirit	24	9	3	12	31	33	−2	30	
8	Sydney Olympic	24	7	8	9	26	31	−5	29	
9	Wollongong Wolves	24	8	5	11	34	41	−7	29	
10	Sydney United	24	7	8	9	18	25	−7	29	
11	Newcastle United	24	6	6	12	18	33	−15	24	
12	Melbourne Knights	24	6	5	13	21	41	−20	23	
13	Football Kingz	24	4	3	17	25	51	−26	15	

Source: ozfootball.net
Rules for classification: 1) Points; 2) Goal difference; 3) Goals scored;
(C) Champions

=== Home and away season ===
==== Round 1 ====
19 September 2003

Wollongong Wolves	0 – 1	Sydney United
	Report	Vrkic 19' (Pen)

WIN Stadium
Attendance: 2,346
Referee: Matthew Breeze

20 September 2003

Parramatta Power	0 – 0	South Melbourne FC
	Report

Parramatta Stadium
Attendance: 1,861
Referee: Simon Micallef

20 September 2003

Football Kingz	1 – 2	Newcastle United
Ngata 74'	Report	Masi 19'; Wheelhouse 29'

Ericsson Stadium
Attendance: 2,304
Referee: D. Rugg

21 September 2003

Melbourne Knights	1 – 1	Marconi Stallions
Pelikan 46'	Report	Maloney 27'

Knights Stadium
Attendance: 2,205
Referee: Craig Zetter

21 September 2003

Northern Spirit	1 – 3	Brisbane Strikers
Hutchinson 53'	Report	Morley 15', 45'; Rose 62'

Pittwater Park
Attendance: 2,971
Referee: C. Diomis

30 November 2003

Sydney Olympic	0 – 0	Adelaide United

OKI Jubilee Stadium
Attendance: 2,370
Referee: James Lewis

==== Round 2 ====
26 September 2003

Newcastle United	2 – 1	Northern Spirit
Wheelhouse 2' (Pen), 77' (Pen)	Report	Macallister 28'

Energy Australia Stadium
Attendance: 4,673
Referee: James Lewis

27 September 2003

Brisbane Strikers	1 – 1	Sydney Olympic
Pilic 53'	Report	Bakis 63'

Perry Park
Attendance: 2,625
Referee: Mark Shield

27 September 2003

Marconi Stallions	2 – 1	Wollongong Wolves
Maloney 9', 18'		Majurovski 73'

Marconi Stadium
Attendance: 1,945
Referee: Simon Micallef

28 September 2003

Sydney United	2 – 1	Football Kingz
Langdon 58', Zmire 62', Ozbey (red card) 85'	Report	Cunico 73' (OG)

Sydney United Sports Centre
Attendance: 3,169
Referee: Ben Williams

28 September 2003

Perth Glory	3 – 0	Melbourne Knights
Mori 82', Pondeljak 87', Caceres 88'	Report

Arena Joondalup
Attendance: 9,780
Referee: Eddie Lennie

25 February 2004

Adelaide United	0 – 2	Parramatta Power
	Report	Elrich 5', Milicic 52'

Hindmarsh Stadium
Attendance: 12,125
Referee: Perry Mur

==== Round 3 ====
3 October 2003

Wollongong Wolves	0 – 4	South Melbourne FC
	Report	Coveny 16', 53', Curcija 78', Poutakidis 92'

WIN Stadium
Attendance: 2,005
Referee: Mark Shield

4 October 2003

Northern Spirit	4 – 0	Sydney Olympic
Richter 47', Ferguson 57', Macallister 68', Petrie 81'	Report

Pittwater Park
Attendance: 2,819
Referee: Matthew Breeze

4 October 2003

Parramatta Power	4 – 1	Football Kingz
Dodd 33', 36', 73', Elrich 94'	Report	Martin 57'

Parramatta Stadium
Attendance: 1,616
Referee: Craig Zetter

4 October 2003

Brisbane Strikers	0 – 0	Perth Glory
	Report

Perry Park
Attendance: 3,042
Referee: P. Green

4 October 2003

Marconi Stallions	1 – 1	Newcastle United
Renaud (red card) 72', Costanzo 92'	Report	Middleby 54', Thomas (red card) 72'

Marconi Stadium
Attendance: 2,068
Referee: Eddie Lennie

8 February 2004

Melbourne Knights	3 – 4	Adelaide United
Vasilevski 53', Marinos 57', 90'	Report	Alagich 45', Aloisi 62', Brooks 65', Veart 83'

Knights Stadium
Attendance: 1,164
Referee: James Lewis

==== Round 4 ====
10 October 2003

Newcastle United	1 – 1	Parramatta Power
Ceccoli 28' (o.g.)	Report	Dodd 45'

Energy Australia Stadium
Attendance: 3,501
Referee: Matthew Breeze

12 October 2003

Football Kingz	1 – 3	Perth Glory
Ngata 64'	Report	Despotovski 48', Pondeljak 57', Mori 67'

Ericsson Stadium
Attendance: 1,245
Referee: D. Rugg

12 October 2003

Melbourne Knights	1 – 2	Wollongong Wolves
Pelikan 11'		Young 7', Hawrysiuk 83'

Knights Stadium
Attendance: 3,100
Referee: Perry Mur

12 October 2003

South Melbourne FC	0 – 1	Brisbane Strikers
	Report	Brain 47'

Bob Jane Stadium
Attendance: 7,250
Referee: Eddie Lennie

12 October 2003

Sydney Olympic	1 – 0	Sydney United
Baird 62'	Report

OKI Jubilee Stadium
Attendance: 4,327
Referee: Simon Micallef

12 October 2003

Marconi Stallions	2 – 1	Northern Spirit
Harris 21', Spiteri 54'	Report	Petrie 40'

Marconi Stadium
Attendance: 2,255
Referee: A. Nardi

==== Round 5 ====
17 October 2003

Adelaide United	1 – 0	Brisbane Strikers
Veart 38'	Report

Hindmarsh Stadium
Attendance: 15,568
Referee: Craig Zetter

19 October 2003

Football Kingz	1 – 2	Melbourne Knights
Ngata 4'	Report	Pelikan 26', Oksuz 72'

Ericsson Stadium
Attendance: 1,271
Referee: C. Diomis

19 October 2003

Sydney Olympic	1 – 2	Marconi Stallions
Schirripa 92'		Webb 8', Spiteri 80'

OKI Jubilee Stadium
Attendance: 5,199
Referee: P. Green

19 October 2003

Sydney United	0 – 2	Parramatta Power
	Report	Milicic 15', 92'

Sydney United Sports Centre
Attendance: 3,152
Referee: Mark Shield

19 October 2003

South Melbourne	4 – 1	Newcastle United
Coveny 24' (pen.), 39', 76', Perosh 56' (o.g.)	Report	Owens 30'

Bob Jane Stadium
Attendance: 3,750
Referee: D. Rugg

19 October 2003

Northern Spirit	3 – 5	Perth Glory
O'Sullivan 6', 34', Osman 38'	Report	Pondeljak 11', Mori 12', Despotovski 14', Hassell 43', 48'

Pittwater Park
Attendance: 2,867
Referee: Matthew Breeze

==== Round 6 ====
24 October 2003

Newcastle United	2 – 3	Adelaide United
Owens 16', R. Griffiths 61'	Report	Veart 64' (pen.), 78', Vidmar 73'

Energy Australia Stadium
Attendance: 3,005
Referee: C. Diomis

25 October 2003

Marconi Stallions	1 – 2	Parramatta Power
Anabalon 46'	Report	Buonavoglia 33', Thompson 76'

Marconi Stadium
Attendance: 2,040
Referee: P. Mur

26 October 2003

Melbourne Knights	0 – 1	Northern Spirit
		Macallister 2'

Knights Stadium
Attendance: 2,900
Referee: B. Williams

26 October 2003

Sydney Olympic	0 – 2	Perth Glory
	Report	Mori 37', 76'

OKI Jubilee Stadium
Attendance: 3,383
Referee: S. Pryzdacz

26 October 2003

Sydney United	0 – 0	South Melbourne
	Report

Sydney United Sports Centre
Attendance: 2,691
Referee: C. Zetter

19 January 2004

Wollongong Wolves	1 – 2	Football Kingz
Hawrysiuk 2'		Hickey 9', Ngata 48' (pen.)

WIN Stadium
Attendance: 3,226
Referee: B. Williams

==== Round 7 ====
1 November 2003

Brisbane Strikers	2 – 1	Newcastle United
Morley 36', Brownlie 45'	Report	Tsekenis 90'

Perry Park
Attendance: 2,715
Referee: J. Lewis

2 November 2003

Parramatta Power	6 – 0	Perth Glory
Milicic 8', 37', 44', Buonavoglia 29', 49', Colosimo 90'	Report

Parramatta Stadium
Attendance: 2,639
Referee: M. Breeze

2 November 2003

Sydney Olympic	0 – 2	Melbourne Knights
	Report	Pelikan 19', 41'

OKI Jubilee Stadium
Attendance: 2,593
Referee: S. Micallef

2 November 2003

Adelaide United	0 – 0	Sydney United
	Report

Hindmarsh Stadium
Attendance: 14,413
Referee: A. Nardi

2 November 2003

Northern Spirit	3 – 0	Wollongong Wolves
Petrie 35', 64', 80'	Report

Pittwater Park
Attendance: 2,388
Referee: E. Lennie

2 November 2003

South Melbourne	2 – 0	Marconi Stallions
Boutsianis 62', Coveny 69'	Report

Bob Jane Stadium
Attendance: 5,950
Referee: M. Shield

==== Round 8 ====
7 November 2003

Wollongong Wolves	0 – 1	Sydney Olympic
	Report	Cardozo 74' (pen.)

WIN Stadium
Attendance: 2,251
Referee: C. Diomis

8 November 2003

Football Kingz	0 – 2	Northern Spirits
	Report	Macallister 55', Ferguson 68' (pen.)

Ericsson Stadium
Attendance: 1,662
Referee: B. Hugo

8 November 2003

Parramatta Power	4 – 0	Melbourne Knights
Kovacic 37' (o.g.), Milicic 54', 62', Dodd 78'	Report

Parramatta Stadium
Attendance: 1,683
Referee: P. Green

8 November 2003

Marconi Stallions	0 – 0	Adelaide United

Marconi Stadium
Attendance: 1,820
Referee: C. Zetter

9 November 2003

Perth Glory	1 – 0	South Melbourne
Despotovski 62' (pen.)	Report

Arena Joondalup
Attendance: 7,356
Referee: S. Micallef

9 November 2003

Sydney United	3 – 0	Brisbane Strikers
Collina 7', Doumanis 56' (pen.), 89'

Sydney United Sports Centre
Attendance: 2,756
Referee: M. Breeze

==== Round 9 ====
14 November 2003

Newcastle United	0 – 0	Sydney United
	Report

Energy Australia Stadium
Attendance: 3,672
Referee: P. Mur

14 November 2003

Wollongong Wolves	3 – 1	Parramatta Power
Arrarte 29', Hawrysiuk 41', 54'	Report	Ceccoli 33'

WIN Stadium
Attendance: 2,085
Referee: B. Hugo

15 November 2003

Marconi Stallions	1 – 0	Brisbane Strikers
Carle 68'	Report

Marconi Stadium
Attendance: 2,439
Referee: S. Micallef

16 November 2003

Sydney Olympic	2 – 2	Football Kingz
Ishida 10', Cardozo 36'		Rowley 3', Souris 45' (o.g.)

OKI Jubilee Stadium
Attendance: 2,398
Referee: B. Williams

16 November 2003

Melbourne Knights	0 – 5	South Melbourne
	Report	Panopoulos 14', Trimboli 22', 34', Coveny 39', Curcija 89'

Knights Stadium
Attendance: 6,200
Referee: A. Nardi

16 November 2003

Adelaide United	1 – 4	Perth Glory
Kemp 19'	Report	Pondeljak 15', 92', Mori 16', Despotovski 49'

Hindmarsh Stadium
Attendance: 13,096
Referee: M. Breeze

==== Round 10 ====
21 November 2003

Newcastle United	0 – 1	Sydney Olympic
		Caravella 84'

Energy Australia Stadium
Attendance: 1,651
Referee: C. Zetter

22 November 2003

Brisbane Strikers	4 – 2	Parramatta Power
Moon 34', Rose 71', 86', Morley 90'	Report	Milicic 11', Rech 58'

Perry Park
Attendance: 2,170
Referee: C. Diomis

23 November 2003

Football Kingz	3 – 1	Marconi Stallions
Tambouras 28', Martin 65', Midtsian 78'	Report	Carle 86' (pen.)

Ericsson Stadium
Attendance: 1,410
Referee: D. Rugg

23 November 2003

Northern Spirit	0 – 1	Sydney United
	Report	Šantalab 4'

Pittwater Park
Attendance: 1,371
Referee: B. Hugo

23 November 2003

Wollongong Wolves	2 – 1	Perth Glory
Young 3', Nwaogazi 54'	Report	Mori 69'

WIN Stadium
Attendance: 1,879
Referee: P. Green

23 November 2003

South Melbourne	2 – 1	Adelaide United
Kovacevic 23', 61'	Report	Veart 70'

Bob Jane Stadium
Attendance: 8,359
Referee: S. Micallef

==== Round 11 ====
28 November 2003

Adelaide United	2 – 2	Wollongong Wolves
Valkanis 48', Saric 81'	Report	Nwaogazi 20', Blake 90'

Hindmarsh Stadium
Attendance: 9,528
Referee: P. Mur

28 November 2003

Newcastle United	1 – 0	Perth Glory
Masi 82'	Report

Energy Australia Stadium
Attendance: 2,976
Referee: S. Micallef

29 November 2003

Parramatta Power	3 – 0	Northern Spirit
Milicic 19', 47', Elrich 96'	Report

Parramatta Stadium
Attendance: 3,123
Referee: B. Williams

29 November 2003

Brisbane Strikers	1 – 0	Melbourne Knights
Moon 66'	Report

Perry Park
Attendance: 2,354
Referee: S. Pryzdacz

30 November 2003

South Melbourne	6 – 0	Football Kingz
Curcija 3', 57', 72', 85', Laurie 34', Tunbridge 90'

Bob Jane Stadium
Attendance: 5,005
Referee: C. Diomis

30 November 2003

Sydney United	1 – 1	Marconi Stallions
Collina 80'	Report	Spiteri 53'

Sydney United Sports Centre
Attendance: 4,132
Referee: E. Lennie

==== Round 12 ====
5 December 2003

Wollongong Wolves	1 – 1	Brisbane Strikers
Nwaogazi 46'	Report	Brain 13'

WIN Stadium
Attendance: 2,130
Referee: C. Zetter

6 December 2003

Football Kingz	1 – 3	Adelaide United
Ngata 80'	Report	Pellegrino 50', Smeltz 76', Veart 86'

Ericsson Stadium
Attendance: 1,121
Referee: P. Green

7 December 2003

Sydney Olympic	0 – 1	Parramatta Power
		Milicic 78'

OKI Jubilee Stadium
Attendance: 3,203
Referee: D. Rugg

7 December 2003

Melbourne Knights	1 – 1	Newcastle United
Razov 49'		R. Griffiths 58'

Knights Stadium
Attendance: 2,673
Referee: E. Lennie

7 December 2003

Northern Spirit	3 – 1	South Melbourne
Petrie 45', 56', Fisher 88'	Report	Curcija 54'

Pittwater Park
Attendance: 1,859
Referee: A. Nardi

2 February 2004

Perth Glory	2 – 0	Sydney United
Mori 20', Mrdja 81'	Report

Members Equity Stadium
Attendance: 6,801
Referee: M. Breeze

==== Round 13 ====
17 October 2003

Newcastle United	2 – 0	Wollongong Wolves
R. Griffiths 6', Libbesson 91'	Report

Energy Australia Stadium
Attendance: 3,513
Referee: S. Przydacz

10 December 2003

Adelaide United	1 – 0	Northern Spirit
Saric 8'	Report

Hindmarsh Stadium
Attendance: 9,159
Referee: C. Zetter

10 December 2003

Brisbane Strikers	1 – 1	Football Kingz
McLaren 10'	Report	Rowley 14'

Perry Park
Attendance: 2,336
Referee: P. Green

10 December 2003

Marconi Stallions	0 – 2	Perth Glory
	Report	Mori 68', Despotovski 73'

Marconi Stadium
Attendance: 1,851
Referee: B. Hugo

10 December 2003

South Melbourne	4 – 2	Sydney Olympic
Tunbridge 7', Poutakidis 25', Curcija 32', Boutsianis 78'		Augerinos 36', Bakis 62'

Bob Jane Stadium
Attendance: 4,125
Referee: P. Mur

10 December 2003

Sydney United	3 – 1	Melbourne Knights
Babic 47', Cunico 56', Parisi 66'	Report	Vasilevski 83'

Sydney United Sports Centre
Attendance: 1,876
Referee: C. Diomis

==== Round 14 ====
12 December 2003

Newcastle United	2 – 0	Football Kingz
Johnson 34', Deans 55'	Report

Energy Australia Stadium
Attendance: 1,433
Referee: B. Williams

13 December 2003

Brisbane Strikers	3 – 1	Northern Spirit
Morley 56', Brownlie 82', Pilic 87'	Report	Kwasnik 46'

Perry Park
Attendance: 2,137
Referee: A. Nardi

13 December 2003

Marconi Stallions	0 – 1	Melbourne Knights
	Report	Marinos 92'

Marconi Stadium
Attendance: 1,650
Referee: D. Rugg

14 December 2003

Sydney United	0 – 1	Wollongong Wolves
	Report	Nwaogazi 47'

Sydney United Sports Centre
Attendance: 3,002
Referee: S. Przydacz

14 December 2003

Adelaide United	1 – 1	Sydney Olympic
Thompson 87'	Report	Cardozo 62'

Hindmarsh Stadium
Attendance: 11,153
Referee: E. Lennie

14 December 2003

South Melbourne	2 – 1	Parramatta Power
Coveny 34' (pen.), 62' (pen.)	Report	Rech 15'

Bob Jane Stadium
Attendance: 10,005
Referee: B. Hugo

==== Round 15 ====
19 December 2003

Football Kingz	0 – 1	Sydney United
	Report	Haliti 45'

Ericsson Stadium
Attendance: 1,054
Referee: J. Lewis

19 December 2003

Wollongong Wolves	3 – 3	Marconi Stallions
Young 2', 68', Nwaogazi 81'	Report	Carle 45', Maloney 52', Brosque 77'

WIN Stadium
Attendance: 2,302
Referee: S. Micallef

20 December 2003

Parramatta Power	1 – 2	Adelaide United
Petrovski 44'	Report	Aloisi 10', Veart 18'

Parramatta Stadium
Attendance: 1,967
Referee: A. Nardi

21 December 2003

Sydney Olympic	1 – 1	Brisbane Strikers
Bakis 53'		Pilic 12'

OKI Jubilee Stadium
Attendance: 2,690
Referee: C. Diomis

21 December 2003

Melbourne Knights	0 – 2	Perth Glory
	Report	Mrdja 32', 74'

Knights Stadium
Attendance: 3,693
Referee: M. Shield

21 December 2003

Northern Spirit	1 – 1	Newcastle United
Thomas 62' (o.g.)	Report	Masi 34'

Pittwater Park
Attendance: 1,935
Referee: E. Lennie

==== Round 16 ====
27 December 2003

Perth Glory	6 – 1	Brisbane Strikers
Despotovski 26', Byrnes 45', Hassell 55', Caceres 74', Pondeljak 76', Mrdja 84'	Report	Brownlie 55' (pen.)

Members Equity Stadium
Attendance: 12,142
Referee: E. Lennie

27 December 2003

South Melbourne	2 – 3	Wollongong Wolves
Boutsianis 67', Coveny 81'	Report	Arrarte 13', Nwaogazi 76', Balabanel 90'

Bob Jane Stadium
Attendance: 6,780
Referee: B. Williams

28 December 2003

Sydney Olympic	1 – 0	Northern Spirit
Baird 47' (pen.)	Report

OKI Jubilee Stadium
Attendance: 2,484
Referee: M. Shield

28 December 2003

Football Kingz	1 – 2	Parramatta Power
Schjerven 34'	Report	Gumprecht 20', Rech 62'

Waikato Stadium
Attendance: 1,176
Referee: C. Zetter

28 December 2003

Newcastle United	0 – 1	Marconi Stallions
	Report	Maloney 29'

Energy Australia Stadium
Attendance: 3,084
Referee: B. Hugo

28 December 2003

Adelaide United	2 – 1	Melbourne Knights
Veart 15', Terminello 31'	Report	Trajanovski 4'

Hindmarsh Stadium
Attendance: 13,032
Referee: S. Micallef

==== Round 17 ====
2 January 2004

Parramatta Power	4 – 0	Newcastle United
Dodd 57', Petrovski 62', 84', Milicic 71'

Parramatta Stadium
Attendance: 2,736
Referee: B. Williams

3 January 2003

Brisbane Strikers	1 – 0	South Melbourne
Grierson 79'

Perry Park
Attendance: 3,417
Referee: M. Shield

3 January 2004

Perth Glory	4 – 0	Football Kingz
Murphy 29', Faria 56', Mrdja 62', 78'

Members Equity Stadium
Attendance: 9,856
Referee: C. Diomis

4 January 2004

Sydney United	0 – 0	Sydney Olympic

Sydney United Sports Centre
Attendance: 3,462
Referee: M. Breeze

4 January 2004

Wollongong Wolves	1 – 1	Melbourne Knights
Young 50' (pen.)		Trajanovski 66'

WIN Stadium
Attendance: 3,211
Referee: N. Rice

4 January 2004

Northern Spirit	0 – 0	Marconi Stallions

Pittwater Park
Attendance: 2,115
Referee: S. Przydacz

==== Round 18 ====
19 December 2003

Newcastle United	0 – 1	South Melbourne
		Curcija 7'

Energy Australia Stadium
Attendance: 1,231
Referee: P. Green

7 January 2004

Parramatta Power	5 – 1	Sydney United
Milicic 8', Pantelis 28', 33', Zorbas 40', Doumanis 92' (o.g.)		B. Šantalab 67'

Parramatta Stadium
Attendance: 3,105
Referee: M. Breeze

7 January 2004

Melbourne Knights	1 – 0	Football Kingz
Marth 45'

Knights Stadium
Attendance: 1,516
Referee: C. Zetter

7 January 2004

Brisbane Strikers	1 – 0	Adelaide United
Morley 10'

Perry Park
Attendance: 3,298
Referee: P. Mur

21 January 2004

Perth Glory	3 – 2	Northern Spirit
Murphy 9', Pondeljak 42', Despotovski 85'		Richter 25', Tomasevic 92'

Members Equity Stadium
Attendance: 7,996
Referee: E. Lennie

11 February 2004

Marconi Stallions	1 – 0	Sydney Olympic
Carle 79' (pen.)

Marconi Stadium
Attendance: 2,433
Referee: C. Diomis

==== Round 19 ====
10 January 2004

Perth Glory	2 – 0	Sydney Olympic
Murphy 76', 84'

Members Equity Stadium
Attendance: 9,005
Referee: A. Nardi

11 January 2004

Football Kingz	1 – 1	Wollongong Wolves
Martin 13'		Dragas 76'

Ericsson Stadium
Attendance: 1,175
Referee: D. Rugg

11 January 2004

Northern Spirit	2 – 0	Melbourne Knights
Hutchinson 21', Milligan 58'

Pittwater Park
Attendance: 1,496
Referee: J. Lewis

11 January 2004

Adelaide United	0 – 0	Newcastle United

Hindmarsh Stadium
Attendance: 14,280
Referee: P. Green

11 January 2004

South Melbourne	1 – 0	Sydney United
Coveny 65' (pen.)

Bob Jane Stadium
Attendance: 5,750
Referee: E. Lennie

4 February 2004

Parramatta Power	2 – 2	Marconi Stallions
Milicic 4', Rech 76'		Brosque 46', Spiteri 81'

Parramatta Stadium
Attendance: 2,234
Referee: M. Breeze

==== Round 20 ====
16 January 2004

Newcastle United	1 – 0	Brisbane Strikers
Wheelhouse 20'

Energy Australia Stadium
Attendance: 2,181
Referee: P. Green

16 January 2004

Wollongong Wolves	4 – 1	Northern Spirit
Hughes 35', Young 38', 65', Nwaogazi 64'		Richter 84'

WIN Stadium
Attendance: 2,855
Referee: J. Lewis

17 January 2004

Perth Glory	4 – 1	Parramatta Power
Mrdja 18', 52', Despotovski 27' (pen.), Caceres 90'		Sekulovski 74'

Members Equity Stadium
Attendance: 12,624
Referee: E. Lennie

18 January 2004

Sydney United	1 – 1	Adelaide United
Šantalab 89'		Alagich 76'

Sydney United Sports Centre
Attendance: 2,065
Referee: M. Breeze

18 January 2004

Melbourne Knights	1 – 1	Sydney Olympic
Marth 89' (pen.)		Caravella 3'

Knights Stadium
Attendance: 2,173
Referee: P. Mur

17 February 2004

Marconi Stallions	1 – 0	South Melbourne
Maloney 38'

Marconi Stadium
Attendance: 1,277
Referee: M. Shield

==== Round 21 ====
21 January 2004

Sydney Olympic	5 – 2	Wollongong Wolves
Caravella 44', Cardozo 57', 92', Nikas 63', Goutzioulis 89'		Nwaogazi 16', Majurovski 75'

OKI Jubilee Stadium
Attendance: 2,369
Referee: C. Zetter

25 January 2004

Melbourne Knights	1 – 3	Parramatta Power
Oksuz 52'		Rech 27', 76', 92'

Knights Stadium
Attendance: 1,868
Referee: P. Green

26 January 2004

South Melbourne	0 – 0	Perth Glory

Bob Jane Stadium
Attendance: 11,642
Referee: M. Breeze

4 February 2004

Brisbane Strikers	2 – 0	Sydney United
McCloughan 20', Pilic 84'

Perry Park
Attendance: 1,617
Referee: M. Shield

20 February 2004

Adelaide United	1 – 0	Marconi Stallions
Veart 3'

Hindmarsh Stadium
Attendance: 13,690
Referee: S. Micallef

20 February 2004

Northern Spirit	1 – 0	Football Kingz
Richter 60'

Gabbie Stadium
Attendance: 1,061
Referee: C. Zetter

==== Round 22 ====
31 January 2004

Perth Glory	2 – 0	Adelaide United
Mori 30', 34'

Members Equity Stadium
Attendance: 9,711
Referee: A. Nardi

31 January 2004

South Melbourne	4 – 0	Melbourne Knights
Leijer 23' (o.g.), Sarkies 41', Curcija 52', Tunbridge 90'

Bob Jane Stadium
Attendance: 8,120
Referee: M. Shield

31 January 2004

Football Kingz	2 – 4	Sydney Olympic
Hickey 51', Rowley 94'		Cardozo 8', Juric 28', Bojić 58', Ishida 63'

Waikato Stadium
Attendance: 1,013
Referee: N. Rice

31 January 2004

Parramatta Power	4 – 3	Wollongong Wolves
Milicic 14', Rech 40', Petrovski 49', Gumprecht 63'		van Blerk 3', Nwaogazi 23', Sabljak 42'

Parramatta Stadium
Attendance: 2,237
Referee: E. Lennie

1 February 2004

Sydney United	2 – 0	Newcastle United
B. Šantalab 22', Austin 40'

Sydney United Sports Centre
Attendance: 2,276
Referee: P. Mur

1 February 2004

Brisbane Strikers	0 – 2	Marconi Stallions
		Maloney 66', Carle 87'

Perry Park
Attendance: 2,257
Referee: S. Micallef

==== Round 23 ====
6 February 2004

Adelaide United	2 – 0	South Melbourne
Budin 6', Aloisi 31'

Hindmarsh Stadium
Attendance: 12,463
Referee: E. Lennie

7 February 2004

Perth Glory	2 – 0	Wollongong Wolves
Despotovski 33', Mori 62'

Members Equity Stadium
Attendance: 9,233
Referee: M. Shield

7 February 2004

Marconi Stallions	2 – 1	Football Kingz
Gibson 31', Carle 61'		Harries 92'

Marconi Stadium
Attendance: 1,740
Referee: B. Williams

8 February 2004

Sydney United	0 – 0	Northern Spirit

Sydney United Sports Centre
Attendance: 1,964
Referee: S. Micallef

8 February 2004

Sydney Olympic	2 – 0	Newcastle United
Cardozo 72', 79'

OKI Jubilee Stadium
Attendance: 2,685
Referee: D. Rugg

9 February 2004

Parramatta Power	3 – 2	Brisbane Strikers
Milicic 12', 37', Pantelis 47'		Fitzsimmons 56', Rose 81'

Parramatta Stadium
Attendance: 1,873
Referee: M. Breeze

==== Round 24 ====
13 February 2004

Wollongong Wolves	0 – 1	Adelaide United
		Brooks 80'

WIN Stadium
Attendance: 3,010
Referee: P. Green

14 February 2004

Perth Glory	2 – 0	Newcastle United
Mori 27', Caceres 85'

Members Equity Stadium
Attendance: 8,678
Referee: C. Zetter

14 February 2004

Football Kingz	2 – 0	South Melbourne
Hickey 19', Ngata 59'

Ericsson Stadium
Attendance: 892
Referee: P. O'Leary

14 February 2004

Marconi Stallions	3 – 0	Sydney United
Brosque 23', Harris 45', Gibson 66'

Marconi Stadium
Attendance: 2,579
Referee: S. Micallef

15 February 2004

Northern Spirit	0 – 1	Parramatta Power
		Petrovski 23'

Pittwater Park
Attendance: 1,106
Referee: J. Lewis

15 February 2004

Melbourne Knights	2 – 0	Brisbane Strikers
R. Vargas 27', Oksuz 88'

Knights Stadium
Attendance: 2,469
Referee: C. Diomis

==== Round 25 ====
23 January 2004

Adelaide United	1 – 0	Football Kingz
Veart 58'

Hindmarsh Stadium
Attendance: 12,312
Referee: M. Shield

20 February 2004

Newcastle United	0 – 2	Melbourne Knights
		Pelikan 64', 75' (pen.)

Energy Australia Stadium
Attendance: 3,263
Referee: J. Lewis

20 February 2004

Parramatta Power	3 – 2	Sydney Olympic
Rech 4', Milicic 34', Thompson 82'		Caravella 3', P. Cardozo 43'

Parramatta Stadium
Attendance: 2,832
Referee: M. Shield

21 February 2004

Brisbane Strikers	0 – 1	Wollongong Wolves
		Nwaogazi 34'

Perry Park
Attendance: 2,824
Referee: E. Lennie

22 February 2004

Sydney United	2 – 4	Perth Glory
Šantalab 69', Heffernan 78'		Mrdja 28', 38', 92', Hassell 70'

Sydney United Sports Centre
Attendance: 3,039
Referee: C. Diomis

22 February 2004

South Melbourne	1 – 2	Northern Spirit
Coveny 71'		Kwasnik 52', Richter 68'

Bob Jane Stadium
Attendance: 5,250
Referee: B. Williams

==== Round 26 ====
28 February 2004

Perth Glory	2 – 2	Marconi Stallions
Mori 83', Mrdja 86'		Spiteri 21', 76'

Members Equity Stadium
Attendance: 10,458
Referee: E. Lennie

29 February 2004

Football Kingz	4 – 3	Brisbane Strikers
Hay 42', Ngata 45' (pen.), 81' (pen.), Christie 76'		McKay 7', Rose 54', Fitzsimmons 57'

Ericsson Stadium
Attendance: 950
Referee: D. Rugg

29 February 2004

Northern Spirit	2 – 1	Adelaide United
Kwasnik 27', 69'		Vidmar 45'

Pittwater Park
Attendance: 2,009
Referee: M. Breeze

29 February 2004

Sydney Olympic	0 – 0	South Melbourne

OKI Jubilee Stadium
Attendance: 3,682
Referee: S. Micallef

29 February 2004

Melbourne Knights	0 – 0	Sydney United

Knights Stadium
Attendance: 8,423
Referee: A. Nardi

29 February 2004

Wollongong Wolves	3 – 0	Newcastle United
Nwaogazi 10', Young 19', Sabljak 83'

WIN Stadium
Attendance: 3,531
Referee: P. Green

== Finals ==
=== Bracket ===
Elimination Finals
3	Adelaide United (a)	3	1	4
6	Brisbane Strikers	0	4	4
4	Marconi Stallions	0	0	0
5	South Melbourne	0	2	2

Major/Minor semi-finals
2	Parramatta Power	4	2	6
1	Perth Glory	2	0	2
3	Adelaide United (a.e.t.)	2
5	South Melbourne	1

Preliminary Final
1	Perth Glory	5
3	Adelaide United	0

Grand Final
4 April 2004
Parramatta Power	0
Perth Glory (a.e.t.)	1

=== Elimination Final 1 (3rd v 6th) ===
1st Leg
7 March 2004

Adelaide United	3–0	Brisbane Strikers
Veart 31'; Agius 67'; Brooks 92'	(Report)

Hindmarsh Stadium, Adelaide
Attendance: 16,258
Referee: Williams

2nd Leg
13 March 2004

Brisbane Strikers	4–1	Adelaide United
Moon 45'; Rose 58'; Brain 82'; Grierson 87'	(Report)	Veart 65'

Perry Park, Brisbane
Attendance: 2,790
Referee: Breeze
- Adelaide United progress on away goals rule (4–4 on aggregate)

=== Elimination Final 2 (4th v 5th) ===
1st Leg
7 March 2004

Marconi Stallions	0–0	South Melbourne
	(Report)

Marconi Stadium, Sydney
Attendance: 2,127
Referee: Lennie

2nd Leg
13 March 2004

South Melbourne	2–0	Marconi Stallions
Curcija 20', 60'	(Report)

Bob Jane Stadium, Melbourne
Attendance: 6,063
Referee: Shield
- South Melbourne progress 2–0 on aggregate

=== Major semi Final (1st v 2nd) ===
1st Leg
13 March 2004

Parramatta Power	4–2	Perth Glory
Ceccoli 9'; Petrovski 41'; Zorbas 45'; Milicic 75'	(Report)	Despotovski 46'; Harnwell 56'

Parramatta Stadium, Sydney
Attendance: 6,059
Referee: Micallef

2nd Leg
20 March 2004

Perth Glory	0–2	Parramatta Power
	(Report	Elrich 15'; Petrovski 65'

Members Equity Stadium Perth
Attendance: 14,023
Referee: Breeze
- Parramatta Power progress 6–2 on aggregate

=== Minor semi Final ===
20 March 2004

Adelaide United	2–1 (a.e.t.)	South Melbourne
Aloisi 71'; Alagich 105' (pen.)	(Report	Curcija 12'

Hindmarsh Stadium, Adelaide
Attendance: 16,558
Referee: Micallef

=== Preliminary Final ===
28 March 2004

Perth Glory	5–0	Adelaide United
Despotovski 10', 81'; Mori 51', 69'; Mrdja 88'	(Report)

Subiaco Oval, Perth
Attendance: 17,524
Referee: Shield

=== Grand Final ===
4 April 2004
15:00 AEST

Parramatta Power	0 – 1 (a.e.t.)	Perth Glory
	(Report)	Mrdja 98'

Parramatta Stadium, Sydney
Attendance: 9,630
Referee: Mark Shield

PARRAMATTA POWER:
GK	1	(Australia) Clint Bolton
DF	3	(Australia) Alvin Ceccoli (c)
DF	4	(Australia) Simon Colosimo
DF	5	(Australia) Michael Beauchamp
FW	7	(Australia) Travis Dodd
MF	8	(Germany) Andre Gumprecht	(yellow card) 86'
FW	9	(Australia) Ante Milicic		(substituted off) 68'
DF	13	(Australia) Paul O'Grady
FW	14	(Australia) Sasho Petrovski
FW	21	(Australia) Ahmad Elrich
MF	22	(Australia) Peter Zorbas		(substituted off) 97'
Substitutes:
GK	20	(Australia) Daniel Beltrame
MF	6	(Australia) Matt Thompson		(substituted in) 97'
MF	10	(Brazil) Fernando Rech		(substituted in) 68'
MF	11	(Australia) Lucas Pantelis
DF	16	(Australia) Jacek Sobczyk
Manager:
(Australia) Nick Theodorakopoulos Joe Marston Medal: (Australia) Ahmad Elrich Assistant Referees: Fourth Official:

PERTH GLORY:
GK	1	(Australia) Jason Petkovic
DF	3	(Australia) Matthew Bingley
DF	5	(Australia) Shaun Murphy (c)
FW	10	(Australia) Bobby Despotovski		(substituted off) 82'
MF	11	(Australia) Jade North
DF	12	(Australia) Mark Byrnes	(yellow card) 62'
MF	15	(Australia) Tom Pondeljak
FW	16	(Australia) Damian Mori
DF	19	(Australia) Jamie Harnwell
FW	21	(Australia) Adrian Caceres
DF	24	(Australia) Jamie Coyne		(substituted off) 95'
Substitutes:
GK	20	(Australia) Vince Matassa
MF	4	(Australia) Bradley Hassell		(substituted in) 95'
MF	6	(Australia) Wayne Srhoj
MF	8	(Australia) Anthony Danze
FW	9	(Australia) Nik Mrdja		(substituted in) 82'
Manager:
(England) Mich d'Avray

== Individual awards ==
- Johnny Warren Medal (Player of the Year): Ante Milicic (Parramatta Power)
- U-21 Player of the Year: Alex Brosque (Marconi Stallions)
- Top Scorer(s): Ante Milicic (Parramatta Power – 20 goals)
