= Chimaobi Nwaogazi =

Nigerian footballer (born 1979)

Chima Nwaogazi
Personal information
- Full name: Chimaobi Nwaogazi
- Date of birth: 27 November 1979 (age 46)
- Place of birth: Nigeria
- Position: Striker

Senior career*
Years	Team	Apps	(Gls)
- Udoji United F.C.
2003	Fawkner Blues	16	(8)
2003–2004	Wollongong Wolves FC		
2004–2005	Marconi Stallions FC		
2005	Geylang United		
20??–2007	Wollongong Wolves FC		
- * Club domestic league appearances and goals

Chimaobi Nwaogazi (born 27 November 1979 in Nigeria) is a Nigerian former footballer who is last known to have played for Wollongong Wolves of the Australian lower leagues.

== Career ==
=== Australia ===
Although despondent over the death of his father and brother in late 2003, Nwaogazi adapted to Australia well, finding the net in six straight games for Wollongong Wolves, almost equalling the National Soccer League record held by Damian Mori. He ended up tying the record, scoring his 7th the next round.

=== Singapore ===
One of Geylang United's foreigners for the 2005 S.League, the Nigerian striker came to the club with high expectations, impressing with his form during pre-season. However, making his debut in a 4-4 draw with Home United, he failed to find the net by his third outing. Even then, coach Scott O'Donell put his faith on Nwaogazi but he left in mid-season.
