= Adrian Caceres =

Argentine footballer

Adrián Cáceres
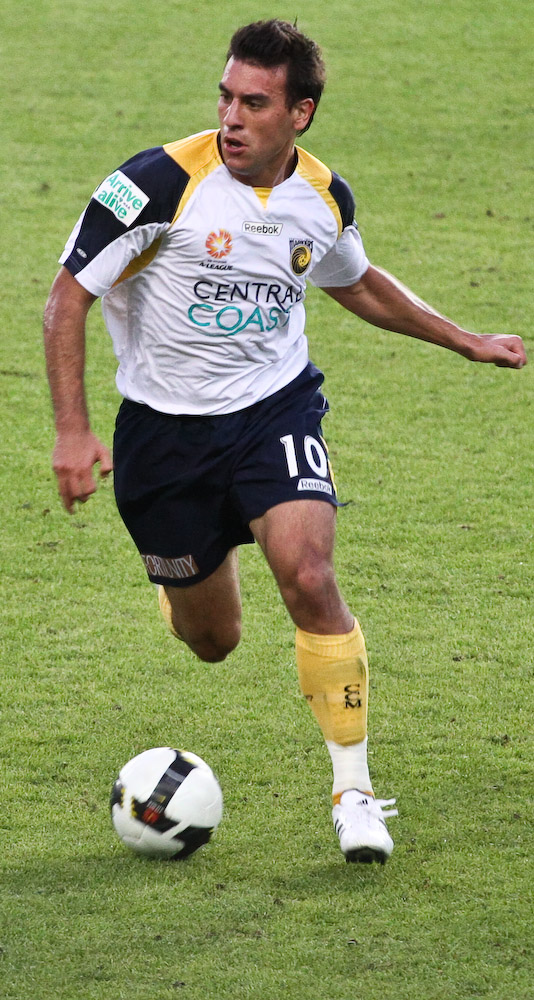

Personal information
- Full name: Claudio Adrián Cáceres
- Date of birth: 10 January 1982 (age 44)
- Place of birth: Buenos Aires, Argentina
- Height: 1.78 m (5 ft 10 in)
- Positions: Left winger; attacking midfielder

Youth career
- 1998: Perth SC

Senior career*
Years	Team	Apps	(Gls)
1999–2000	Perth SC	12	(3)
2000–2001	Southampton	0	(0)
2001	→ Brentford (loan)	5	(0)
2002	Hull City	4	(0)
2002–2004	Perth Glory	43	(7)
2004–2005	Yeovil Town	21	(3)
2005	Wycombe Wanderers	6	(0)
2005	Aldershot Town	6	(0)
2005–2006	Perth Glory	18	(1)
2006–2008	Melbourne Victory	42	(6)
2008–2009	Central Coast Mariners	22	(2)
2009–2010	Wellington Phoenix	19	(1)
2010	Inglewood United	3	(0)
2011	Heidelberg United	5	(1)
2011–2012	Real Mataram	17	(6)
2012–2013	Chiangrai United	0	(0)
2014	Bayswater City	10	(4)
2014	Perth SC	3	(1)
2015	Balcatta FC	10	(3)
Total		226	(38)
- * Club domestic league appearances and goals

Claudio Adrián Cáceres (born 10 January 1982) is an Argentine former footballer who last played for Balcatta FC.

== Club career ==
Caceres started his professional career with English team Southampton before spending a few years with lower Football League clubs including Yeovil Town, Hull City, Wycombe Wanderers, Brentford and Aldershot Town .

He moved back to Australia to play for Perth Glory for the second time in the inaugural A-League season. While putting in some good performances he was never a first team regular because of injury and moved to Melbourne Victory for the second A-League season, where he has reunited with former Perth Glory teammate, Mark Byrnes. The pair played together at Perth Glory, where they won National Soccer League (NSL) championship medals.

On 7 February 2008, Caceres signed a two-year deal with the Central Coast Mariners, which would start following the 2008 Asian Champions League.

In August 2009, Caceres was released from the final year of his two-year contract with the Central Coast Mariners by mutual consent. He was snapped up by the Wellington Phoenix just days later, and eventually scored his first goal for his new club on 18 December 2009 in a 1–1 draw with Adelaide United; however, this was later ruled to have been an own goal from goalkeeper Eugene Galekovic.

== A-League career statistics ==
Correct as of 20 August 2014

Club	Season	League			Asia			Total		
Club	Season	Apps	Goals	Assists	Apps	Goals	Assists	Apps	Goals	Assists
Perth Glory	2005–06	18	1	-	-	-	-	18	1	0
Melbourne Victory	2006–07	22	3	3	-	-	-	22	3	3
Melbourne Victory	2007–08	20	3	2	-	-	-	20	3	2
Central Coast Mariners	2008–09	22	2	2	-	-	-	22	2	2
Wellington Phoenix	2009–10	19	1	-	-	-	-	19	1	0
Total Total		101	10	7	-	-	-	101	10	7

== Personal life ==
On 18 March 2019 he was sentenced to 18 months' jail after being found guilty of dealing methamphetamine.

== Honours ==
Perth Glory

- NSL Championship: 2002–03, 2003–04

Yeovil Town

- Football League Two: 2004–05

Melbourne Victory

- A-League Championship: 2006–07
- A-League Premiership: 2006–07
