= Pittwater Park =

Rugby union stadium in New South Wales, Australia

Pittwater Rugby Park
- Rat Park
- Interactive map of Pittwater Rugby Park
- Location: 1472 Pittwater Road, Warriewood, New South Wales, Australia
- Coordinates: 33°41′49″S 151°18′16″E
- Owner: Northern Beaches Council
- Operator: Northern Beaches Council
- Capacity: 6,000 (1,000 seats)
- Surface: Grass

Construction
- Opened: 1971

Tenants
- Warringah Rugby Club (NSWRU); 1975–present Sydney Rays (NRC); 2015–present

Pittwater Park is a rugby union stadium in Warriewood, New South Wales, Australia. It is located 500 metres from North Narrabeen beach within the reserve of the area. The park is more colloquially known as Rat Park being named after the Warringah Rugby Club whose official mascot is a rat.

The ground was established in 1971, over the years, basic facilities have been added, such as the 1,000-seat grandstand, clubhouse, and training field. Lights have also been installed on the main field.

It is mainly used for rugby union and has been the home ground of the Warringah Rugby Club since 1975. The stadium has a capacity of 6,000.

== See also ==
- List of rugby league stadiums by capacity
- List of rugby union stadiums by capacity
