= Nik Mrdja =

Australian soccer player

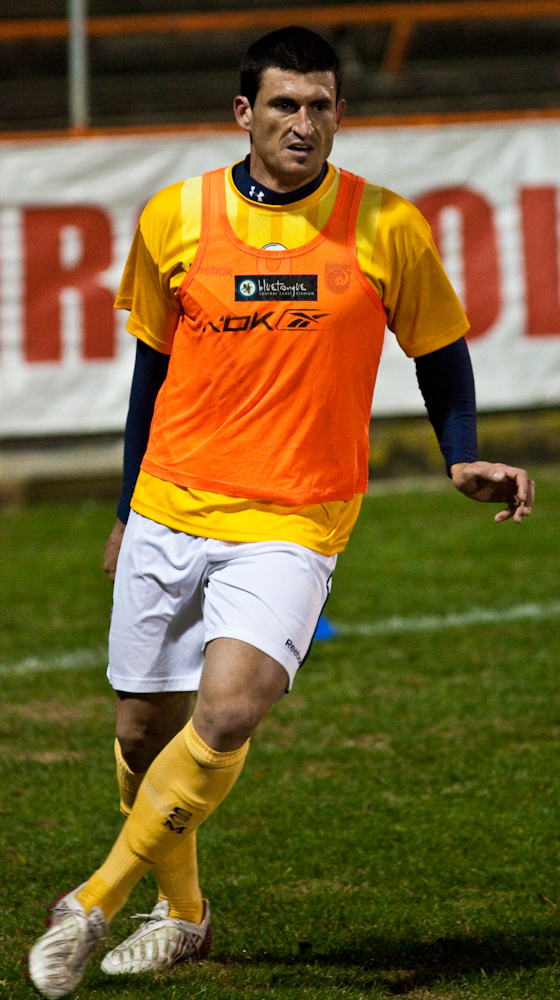
- Mrdja with Central Coast Mariners in 2009

Personal information
- Full name: Nikola Mrdja
- Date of birth: 30 November 1978 (age 47)
- Place of birth: Perth, Western Australia
- Height: 1.86 m (6 ft 1 in)
- Position: Forward

Youth career
- Bayswater City

Senior career*
Years	Team	Apps	(Gls)
1997	Bayswater City		
1998	Kingsway		
1998–1999	Canberra Cosmos	3	(0)
2000–2001	Perth SC	6	(2)
2001–2004	Perth Glory	73	(25)
2004	AIK	12	(2)
2005–2011	Central Coast Mariners	48	(12)
2010	→ Melbourne Victory (loan)	3	(1)

International career
2007	Australia	1	(0)
- * Club domestic league appearances and goals

Nikola "Nik" Mrdja (born 30 November 1978) is an Australian former professional soccer player, who played as a forward. Mrdja had a career spanning several National Soccer League (NSL) and A-League clubs from 1998 to 2011, as well as a brief spell in Sweden with AIK in 2004. Mrdja made one appearance for Australia, in a friendly against Argentina in 2007.

== Club career ==
=== Early years ===
In October 1998, Mrdja signed for Canberra Cosmos after travelling from Perth to Canberra to trial at his own expense. In late November 1998, Mrdja was one of five players released by the club.

In April 2000, Mrdja signed for Perth SC.

Mrdja trialled for Perth Glory in January 2001, signing soon after.

Mrdja scored a golden goal for Perth Glory in the final of the 2003–04 National Soccer League against Parramatta Power in the last match of the NSL.

=== Central Coast Mariners ===
In December 2004, Mrdja signed with Central Coast Mariners to play in the newly formed A-League. In the Mariners first competitive fixture, an F3 Derby against the Newcastle Jets in qualification for the 2005 OFC Club Championship, Mrdja broke opposing defender Andrew Durante's leg with a tackle late in extra time. The incident subsequently gained prominence as a sparking point for the clubs' rivalry. On the field, Mrdja's early form for the Mariners was strong. In the club's next game against Adelaide United, Mrdja scored a hat-trick, sealing progress to the qualification final. He scored another hat-trick in a 2005 A-League Pre-Season Challenge Cup win over Queensland Roar.

However, soon after Mrdja suffered a knee injury causing him to miss the entire 2005–06 A-League season, eventually returning early in the 2006–07 season. His first goal in the A-League came from a direct free kick in a win over New Zealand Knights on 19 November 2006. Mrdja's knee injury continued to be an issue, and saw him miss much of the 2006–07 and 2007–08 seasons.

=== Melbourne Victory ===
In February 2010, with the Mariners out of contention for the 2009–10 A-League finals, Mrdja was released by the Mariners and signed a short-term deal with Melbourne Victory to play in the final rounds of the A-League and in the 2010 AFC Champions League, as an injury replacement for Billy Celeski. At the same time, he signed a deal to play for the Mariners again in the 2010–11 season. The unusual nature of the move, despite being valid within the rules, created significant controversy, given its lateness in the season and the ban on direct loans between A-League clubs. The issue, and subsequent public controversy, prompted a review of the A-League's transfer rules by Football Federation Australia.

Mrdja made his debut for the Victory on 5 February 2010, coming on as a halftime substitute in a win over North Queensland Fury, in the second-last round of the 2009–10 A-League regular season. He scored his first goal for the club two weeks later, in a win in the first leg of the major semifinal against Sydney FC, before being sent off later in the match for elbowing Shannon Cole. Mrdja received a two-game suspension for the incident, which eventually saw him miss the 2010 A-League Grand Final.

Mrdja retired from professional football at the end of the 2010–11 season.

== International career ==
Mrdja was called up to the Australian national team for the first time in September 2007 for a friendly against Argentina, after an injury ruled out Scott McDonald and following Mrdja's good form in the A-League. In the game, at the Melbourne Cricket Ground, Mrdja made his debut as a substitute in the 82nd minute, coming on for Joshua Kennedy in a 1–0 defeat.

== Honours ==
Perth Glory

- National Soccer League Championship: 2002–03, 2003–04
- National Soccer League Premiership: 2001–02, 2003–04

Central Coast Mariners

- A-League Premiership: 2006–07
- A-League Pre-Season Challenge Cup: 2005

== See also ==
- List of Central Coast Mariners FC players
- List of foreign Allsvenskan players
- List of Perth Glory FC players
