= 1999–2000 in Australian soccer =

Soccer in Australia
- Season: 1999–2000

Men's soccer
- NSL Premiership: Perth Glory
- NSL Championship: Wollongong City

Women's soccer
- WNSL Premiership: NSW Sapphires
- WNSL Championship: NSW Sapphires

The 1999–2000 season was the 31st season of national competitive soccer in Australia and 117th overall.

== National teams ==
=== Australia national soccer team ===
==== Results and fixtures ====
===== Friendlies =====
9 February 2000	Chile	2–1	Australia	Valparaíso, Chile
	Gonzalez 10'; Navia 90+2' (pen.)	Report	Corica 15'	Stadium: Estadio Playa Ancha; Attendance: 9,000; Referee: Eduardo Gamboa (Chile)

12 February 2000	Australia	0–0	Slovakia	Valparaíso, Chile
		Report		Stadium: Estadio Playa Ancha; Attendance: 9,000; Referee: Luis Mariano Pena (Chile)

15 February 2000	Australia	1–1	Bulgaria	Valparaíso, Chile
	Agostino 1'	Report	Ivanov 89'	Stadium: Estadio Playa Ancha; Attendance: 8,000; Referee: Ruben Selman (Chile)

23 February 2000	Hungary	0–3	Australia	Budapest, Hungary
		Report	Laybutt 12'; Skoko 72'; Moore 89'	Stadium: Üllői úti Stadion; Attendance: 14,000; Referee: Dietmar Drabek (Austria)

29 March 2000	Czech Republic	3–1	Australia	Teplice, Czech Republic
	Fukal 10'; Koller 53'; Ulich 66'	Report	Foster 88'	Stadium: Na Stínadlech Stadium; Attendance: 9,820; Referee: Hrinak (Slovenia)

9 June 2000	Australia	0–0	Paraguay	Sydney, Australia
		Report		Stadium: Sydney Football Stadium; Attendance: 10,000; Referee: Simon Micallef (Australia)

12 June 2000	Australia	0–0	Paraguay	Brisbane, Australia
		Report		Stadium: The Gabba; Attendance: 10,000; Referee: Mark Shield (Australia)

15 June 2000	Australia	2–1	Paraguay	Melbourne, Australia
	Foster 47'; Zdrilic 52'	Report	Caceres 58'	Stadium: Olympic Park Stadium; Attendance: 7,500; Referee: Gerry Connolly (Australia)

===== OFC Nations Cup =====
In Australia's fourth OFC Nations Cup run, they were declared Champions after they won 2–0 against New Zealand and had conceded no goals through their whole run in the 2000 OFC Nations Cup.

====== Group A ======
19 June 2000	Cook Islands	0–17	Australia	Papeete, Tahiti
		Report	Agostino 18', 53', 68'; Muscat 21', 45' (pen.); Tiatto 24'; Foster 30', 51', 80'; Zdrilic 35', 42', 65'; Popovic 59'; Corica 70'; Zane 82', 87', 89'	Stadium: Stade de Pater; Attendance: 1,000; Referee: Ronan Leaustic (Tahiti)

23 June 2000	Australia	6–0	Solomon Islands	Papeete, Tahiti
	Chipperfield 6'; Zane 13', 35'; Omokirio 36' (o.g.); Muscat 39' (pen.); Cardozo 43'	Report		Stadium: Stade de Pater; Attendance: 300; Referee: Brian Precious (New Zealand)

====== Knockout stage ======
25 June 2000	Australia	1–0	Vanuatu	Papeete, Tahiti
	Muscat 4' (pen.)	Report		Stadium: Stade de Pater; Attendance: 300; Referee: Brian Precious (New Zealand)

28 June 2000	Australia	2–0	New Zealand	Papeete, Tahiti
	Murphy 40'; Foster 66'	Report		Attendance: 2,000; Referee: Harry Attison (Vanuatu)

===== LG Cup =====
4 October 2000	Kuwait	0–1	Australia	Dubai, United Arab Emirates
		Report	Aloisi 49'

7 October 2000	South Korea	4–2	Australia	Dubai, United Arab Emirates
	Jae-won 44'; Jung-yoon 48'; Ki-hyeon 65'; Dong-gook 90+2' (pen.)	Report	Agostino 30', 35'

=== Australia national women's soccer team ===
==== Friendlies ====
28 October 1999	China	3–1	Australia	Guangdong, China
	Liping 35'; Huilin 37'; Lihong 77'	Report	Hughes 61'	Stadium: Zhuhai Stadium; Attendance: 15,000

31 October 1999	China	4–2	Australia	Xiamen, China
	Ying 15', 58'; Ouying 41'; Haiyan 61'	Report	Hughes 7'; Salisbury 80'	Stadium: Xiamen Stadium; Attendance: 15,000

== OFC competitions ==
=== Oceania Club Championship ===
==== Group stage ====
Team	Pld	W	D	L	GF	GA	GD	Pts
(Australia) South Melbourne	2	2	0	0	12	1	+11	6
(Solomon Islands) Malaita Eagles	2	1	0	1	15	4	+11	3
(American Samoa) Konica Machine	2	0	0	2	2	24	−22	0

18 Sep

South Melbourne	2–1	Malaita Eagles

==== Knockout stage ====
===== Semi-finals =====
Team 1	Score	Team 2
South Melbourne (Australia)	3–0	(French Polynesia) Vénus

===== Final =====
Team 1	Score	Team 2
South Melbourne (Australia)	5–1	(Fiji) Nadi

== Men's soccer ==
=== National Soccer League ===
Pos	Team	Pld	W	D	L	GF	GA	GD	Pts	Qualification
1	Perth Glory	34	19	7	8	60	42	+18	64	Qualification for the Finals series
2	Wollongong Wolves (C)	34	17	9	8	72	44	+28	60	Qualification for the Finals series and the Oceania Club Championship
3	Carlton	34	17	7	10	55	39	+16	58	Qualification for the Finals series
4	Adelaide Force	34	16	8	10	57	37	+20	56	Qualification for the Finals series
5	Sydney Olympic	34	16	7	11	56	40	+16	55	Qualification for the Finals series
6	Marconi Fairfield	34	16	7	11	53	49	+4	55	Qualification for the Finals series
7	Newcastle Breakers	34	14	9	11	44	44	0	51	
8	Auckland Kingz	34	15	5	14	57	59	−2	50	
9	Brisbane Strikers	34	13	10	11	46	40	+6	49	
10	South Melbourne	34	14	7	13	55	51	+4	49	
11	Parramatta Power	34	14	5	15	52	47	+5	47	
12	Melbourne Knights	34	13	6	15	44	57	−13	45	
13	Northern Spirit	34	11	3	20	41	58	−17	36	
14	Canberra Cosmos	34	9	9	16	44	64	−20	36	
15	Gippsland Falcons	34	7	8	19	23	49	−26	29	
16	Sydney United	34	5	5	24	19	58	−39	20	

Source: rsssf.com
Rules for classification: 1) points; 2) goal difference; 3) number of goals scored.
(C) Champions

== Women's soccer ==
=== Women's National Soccer League ===
Pos	Team	Pld	W	D	L	GF	GA	GD	Pts	Qualification or relegation
1	NSW Sapphires (C)	10	7	2	1	26	8	+18	23	Qualification for the Grand Final
2	SASI Pirates	10	5	4	1	13	8	+5	19	Qualification for the Grand Final
3	Queensland Sting	10	5	3	2	21	8	+13	18	
4	Northern NSW Pride	10	3	2	5	18	19	−1	11	
5	Canberra Eclipse	10	2	1	7	15	30	−15	7	
6	Victoria Vision	10	1	2	7	8	28	−20	5	

Source: ozfootball.net
Rules for classification: 1) Points; 2) Goal difference; 3) Goals scored
(C) Champions

==== Grand Final ====
The 1999 Women's National Soccer League Grand Final was played at Marconi Stadium on 20 November. The match was contested between the NSW Sapphires and the SASI Pirates. NSW won the Grand Final in a 1–0 victory by an own goal by Dianne Alagich in the 18th minute.

20 November 1999

NSW Sapphires	1–0	SASI Pirates
Alagich 18' (o.g.)	Report

Marconi Stadium, Sydney
