= Mark Byrnes =

Australian footballer

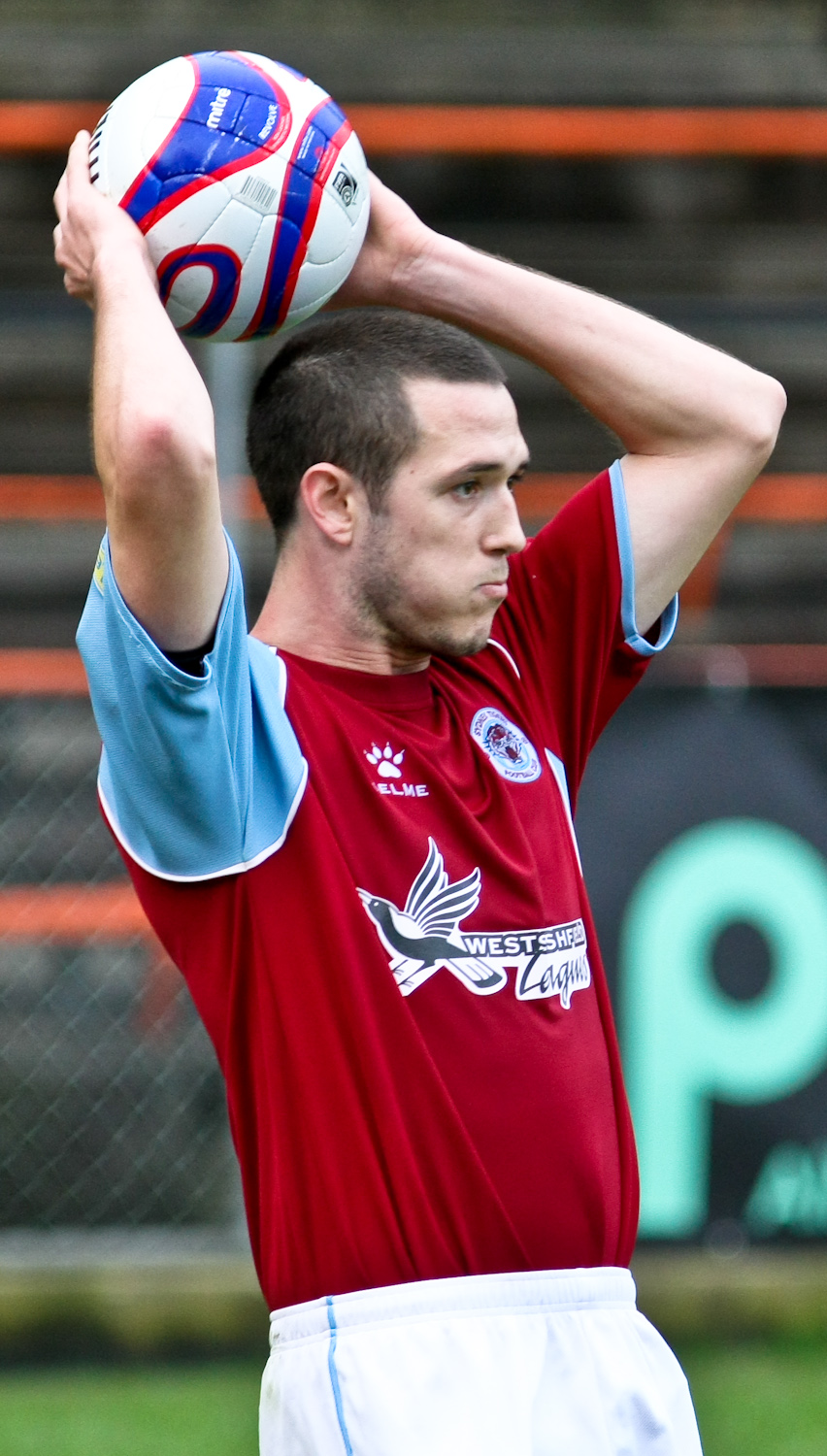

Personal information
- Full name: Mark John Byrnes
- Date of birth: 8 February 1982 (age 44)
- Place of birth: Sydney, Australia
- Height: 1.83 m (6 ft 0 in)
- Position: Centre back

Youth career
- Concord High School
- Sydney Olympic
- 1998–1999: NSWIS

Senior career*
Years	Team	Apps	(Gls)
1999–2000	Parramatta Power	22	(2)
2000–2001	Austria Salzburg	7	(0)
2001–2002	Vicenza Calcio	0	(0)
2002	Sydney Olympic	8	(0)
2003–2004	Perth Glory	44	(2)
2004	FC Hämeenlinna	11	(2)
2005–2007	Melbourne Victory	11	(2)
2007	Richmond SC	15	(1)
2008–2013	APIA Leichhardt Tigers	83	(6)
2009	→ Gold Coast United (loan)	1	(0)

International career^{‡}
1999	Australia U-17		
2001	Australia U-20		
Medal record
Men's football
Representing Australia
FIFA U-17 World Championship
Runner-up	1999 New Zealand
OFC U-19 Men's Championship
Winner	2001 Cook Islands/New Caledonia
- * Club domestic league appearances and goals as of 10 October 2013 ‡ National team caps and goals as of 6 October 2009

Mark John Byrnes (born 8 February 1982) is an Australian footballer who plays for APIA Leichhardt Tigers in the New South Wales Premier League.

== Club career ==
After a short stint with SV Salzburg in Austria, he won two NSL championship medals in a row with Perth Glory.

Due to the demise of the National Soccer League after the 2003/2004 season, in July of that year he signed with Finnish club, FC Hämeenlinna. He returned to Australia to form part of Melbourne Victory's A-League 2005–06 squad, but found his chances limited by the emergence of younger defenders Adrian Leijer and Daniel Piorkowski. He was part of Melbourne's A-League championship winning side in 2006–2007. However at the end of the season, on 1 March 2007, he was released by the club.

In 2007, he was announced as a short term signing for Victorian Premier League side Richmond Eagles for three matches. In 2008, Byrnes went on trial with English lower league football clubs Port Vale and Luton Town. He impressed during an overseas pre-season tour to the extent that he would have been offered a contract had he not suffered a minor injury during the last tour match.

On 23 September 2009 he was signed by Gold Coast United as a four-week injury replacement for Daniel Piorkowski.

== International career ==
He was captain of the Australian Under-17 team which reached the final of the 1999 FIFA U-17 World Championship.

== Honours ==
Perth Glory

- NSL Championship: 2002–03, 2003–04

Australia U-20

- OFC U-19 Men's Championship: 2001

Australia U-17:

- FIFA U-17 World Championship: 1999 (Runners-up)
