= Bobby Despotovski =

Australian football player

Personal information
- Full name: Slobodan Despotovski
- Date of birth: 14 July 1971 (age 55)
- Place of birth: Perth, Western Australia
- Height: 1.80 m (5 ft 11 in)
- Position: Striker

Youth career
- Bratstvo Jedinstvo
- Dinamo Pančevo
- 1989: Red Star Belgrade

Senior career*
| Years | Team | Apps | (Gls) |
| 1989–1991 | Dinamo Pančevo | | |
| 1994 | Floreat Athena | | |
| 1994–1995 | Heidelberg United | 18 | (9) |
| 1995–1996 | Morwell Falcons | 6 | (1) |
| 1996 | Melbourne Warriors | 24 | (26) |
| 1996–2004 | Perth Glory | 212 | (102) |
| 2004–2005 | Bonnyrigg White Eagles | | |
| 2005 | Inglewood United | | |
| 2005–2007 | Perth Glory | 29 | (11) |
| 2007–2008 | Inglewood United | 34 | (25) |

International career
| 2002 | Australia | 4 | (5) |

Managerial career
- 2007–2008: Inglewood United
- 2015–2017: Perth Glory NPL U20s
- 2015–2020: Perth Glory W-League
Medal record
Representing Australia
Men's Association football
OFC Nations Cup
| Runner-up | 2002 New Zealand |
- * Club domestic league appearances and goals

Slobodan "Bobby" Despotovski (born 14 July 1971) is an Australian soccer player who played 12 seasons in the top tier of Australian soccer. He played in National Soccer League (NSL) for Heidelberg United and Morwell Falcons before moving to Perth Glory where he played eight seasons in the NSL and two in the A-League.

== Early life ==
Despotovski was born in Perth, Western Australia, to father, Cvetko, and mother, Valentina. Valentina was born in Kačarevo, Pančevo and married Cvetko in Vojvodina.

Only nine months after his birth his family moved back to Yugoslavia because his mother was homesick. He grew up with his family in the town of Pančevo, 16 km (9.9 mi) outside the capital Belgrade, and played junior level football with Red Star Belgrade.

When Despotovski was 15 he had a choice to continue either handball which he says had always played a large part in his life, or to pursue a career in professional football, eventually he chose football and was selected to play for the reserve team at his first senior club, Dinamo Pančevo.

== Playing career ==
=== Club ===
After a stint with the Yugoslav People's Army during the Yugoslav wars which ended as a result of self-inflicted injuries, Despotovski returned to his birthplace in 1992 and continued his professional career with Floreat Athena in the Western Australian Premier League. In 1994, he joined Heidelberg in the NSL and left the club to join the now defunct NSL club Morwell Falcons in 1995.

Bobby's career took off when he received a call from the then Perth Glory general manager, Roger Lefort. The new club wanted Despotovski to lead their attack in the club's inaugural season and he certainly didn't disappoint scoring 14 goals in only 23 NSL games.

Despotovski was in the centre of a controversy when playing against the Melbourne Knights (a team primarily supported by Croatian Australians) at the Knights Stadium on 21 May 2001 he gave a three fingered salute to the predominantly Croatian crowd which is a Serbian Orthodox symbol that represents Orthodox Christianity. As the Perth team left the stadium Despotovski and Perth coach Bernd Stange were assaulted by angry Knights supporters. To avoid repetition of violence, the next Knights home fixture against Perth was played in Launceston.

He was one of the most successful strikers in the now defunct Australian National Soccer League. Despotovski was with the Western Australian team Perth Glory for 10 years, and holds their all-time goal scoring record. For a couple of seasons, he formed a prolific partnership up front with Damian Mori.

Following the conclusion of the 2004/2005 season of the NSL Despotovski signed with Perth Glory for the 2005/2006 A-League season after a brief stint with the Bonnyrigg White Eagles in the Vodafone Premier League in NSW. Despotovski finished the season as joint top goal scorer of the league and winner of the Johnny Warren Medal. Season 2006/2007 started without Bobby because of his re-occurring back injury but he returned to partner Stuart Young up front.

=== International ===
Despotovski played 4 games for Australia, three of them at the 2002 OFC Nations Cup where he blasted four goals past the New Caledonia goalkeeper.

== Coaching career ==
He was the coach of Inglewood United in 2007, and the coach of Perth boys school Hale School's 1st XI Soccer side in 2008.

He was variously the coach of the Perth Glory NPL U20s team and the Perth Glory's Women's team between 2015 and 2020.

== Personal life ==
Bobby's son, Sebastian Despotovski (born 2005) is a professional footballer, and currently plays for Perth Glory.

== Honours ==
Perth Glory

- NSL Championship: 2002–03, 2003–04

Australia

- OFC Nations Cup: runner-up 2002

Individual

- Johnny Warren Medal: 2005–06 with Perth Glory
- A-League Golden Boot: 2005–06 with Perth Glory – 8 goals
- Perth Glory Most Glorious Player Award: 2005–06, 2003–04, 2001–02, 2000–01
- Perth Glory Player's Player of the Year: 2005–06
- Perth Glory Member's Player of the Year: 2002–03
- W-League Coach of the Year: 2016–17
