= Damian Mori =

Australian soccer player and manager

Personal information
- Date of birth: 30 September 1970 (age 56)
- Place of birth: Melbourne, Australia
- Height: 1.80 m (5 ft 11 in)
- Position: Forward

Senior career*
Years	Team	Apps	(Gls)
1989–1990	South Melbourne	33	(5)
1990–1991	Sunshine George Cross	24	(4)
1991	Bulleen	16	(7)
1991–1992	Melbourne Knights	29	(12)
1992–1996	Adelaide City	126	(75)
1996–1997	Borussia Mönchengladbach	6	(0)
1997–2000	Adelaide City	91	(56)
2000–2004	Perth Glory	112	(77)
2004–2005	Adelaide City	44	(33)
2005–2006	Perth Glory	17	(7)
2006	Adelaide City	18	(13)
2006	Central Coast Mariners	8	(6)
2006–2007	Queensland Roar	8	(2)
2007	Adelaide City	17	(13)
2007	Central Coast Mariners	3	(0)
2008–2010	Adelaide City	37	(22)
2010	South Adelaide Panthers	4	(2)
2011	Adelaide City	3	(0)
Total		596	(334)

International career
1991–1992	Australia U-23	13	(5)
1992–2002	Australia	45	(29)

Managerial career
- 2005–2008: Adelaide City
- 2010–2018: Adelaide City
- 2020–2022: FK Beograd
- 2022–2024: Adelaide United (assistant)
Medal record
Representing Australia
Men's Association football
FIFA Confederations Cup
Runner-up	1997 Saudi Arabia
OFC Nations Cup
Winner	1996 Oceania
Runner-up	1998 Australia
Runner-up	2002 New Zealand
- * Club domestic league appearances and goals

Damian Mori (born 30 September 1970) is an Australian former soccer player who is an assistant coach for Adelaide United. He won two Johnny Warren Medals, awarded to the best player in the Australian league and was top scorer on 5 occasions. He established a reputation as a pacy, poaching goalscorer. Often said to have been a player who started his career as a defender, Damian has in fact, always been a striker.

== Early and personal life ==
Mori was born in Box Hill North, Victoria in 1970. His father, Joseph Mori, was a footballer who emigrated from Slovenia. His paternal grandfather was of Italian ancestry.

== Club career ==
Mori was successful at club level – mainly in the Australian domestic league. After developing into Adelaide City's most important and best player, he spent a single season (1996–97) overseas in Germany with Borussia Mönchengladbach. This move was characterised only by frustration. He appeared in only six games, and never played more than half a match. In those six games, he didn't score once. Mori returned home to become NSL Top Goalscorer the following season.

In 1996, Mori held the world record for the fastest goal after he scored for City in just 3.69 seconds, straight from the kick-off, in a 2–2 draw with Sydney United.

In 2000, Mori transferred to Perth Glory and enjoyed great success. The striking partnership with Bobby Despotovski was renowned as one of the most potent in the competition. Mori won the NSL championship in 2002–03, scoring in the Grand Final. He was also part of the 2003–04 Perth Glory championship side.

Following the end of the National Soccer League in 2004 he moved back to Adelaide City to play and coach in the South Australian Premier League. He was extremely successful here, winning the "Coach of the Year" award. However, many were surprised at the fact that the NSL all-time top goalscorer was not on the shortlist of any A-League club.

It later emerged that a major stumbling block was Mori's desire for a part-time contract to allow him to manage business interests in Adelaide. Prior to round four of the A-League season, it was announced that Perth Glory had signed Mori on a short-term contract to replace injured defender David Tarka. Mori subsequently came on as a substitute in the Glory's 1 – 0 away win over the New Zealand Knights on 22 September 2005. After some excellent displays, particularly a brace against Newcastle United Jets and a hat-trick against Adelaide United, the club strongly desired a permanent deal. After some wrangling with Adelaide City chairman Bob D'Ottavi, Mori agreed to a one-year deal.

On 9 December 2005, it was announced that Mori would be appointed as assistant manager at Perth Glory. This appointment followed the elevation of Alan Vest to Manager after the departure of Steve McMahon. After the completion of the 2005–06 A-League season, Mori returned to Adelaide City as player-manager.

On 27 September 2006, Mori signed with the Central Coast Mariners on a short-term deal to cover the loss of Nik Mrdja which was extended once. After the short-term contract with the Mariners had expired, the FFA did not allow Central Coast to re-sign him. On 21 November 2006, he was approached by new Queensland Roar manager Frank Farina and signed the following day on a short-term "until the end of the season" contract. After the Roar failed to make the playoffs, Mori returned to SA to be the player-coach once again of defending South Australian champions Adelaide City.

== International career ==
Mori made his international debut against Solomon Islands on 4 September 1992. In an international career that spanned over the next ten years, he was capped 45 times and scored 29 goals.

== Career statistics ==
=== Club ===
Appearances and goals by club, season and competition
Club	Season	League			National cup (Note: Includes the NSL Cup.)		Continental		Other		Total	
Club	Season	Division	Apps	Goals	Apps	Goals	Apps	Goals	Apps	Goals	Apps	Goals
South Melbourne	1989	National Soccer League	20	4	0	0	—		—		20	4
South Melbourne	1989–90	National Soccer League	13	1	0	0	—		—		13	1
South Melbourne	Total		33	5	0	0	—		—		33	5
Sunshine George Cross	1990–91	National Soccer League	24	4	2	0	—		—		26	4
Bulleen	1991	Victoria Premier League	16	7	—		—		—		16	7
Melbourne Croatia	1991–92	National Soccer League	26	11	3	1	—		—		29	12
Adelaide City	1992–93	National Soccer League	30	12	3	2	—		—		33	14
Adelaide City	1993–94	National Soccer League	31	11	3	2	—		—		34	13
Adelaide City	1994–95	National Soccer League	27	18	2	0	—		—		29	18
Adelaide City	1995–96	National Soccer League	36	31	3	0	—		—		39	31
Adelaide City	Total		124	72	11	4	—		—		135	76
Borussia Mönchengladbach	1996–97	Bundesliga	6	0	0	0	—		—		6	0
Adelaide City	1997–98	National Soccer League	27	19	—		—		—		27	19
Adelaide City	1998–99	National Soccer League	30	15	—		—		—		30	15
Adelaide City	1999–2000	National Soccer League	34	22	—		—		—		34	22
Adelaide City	Total		91	56	0	0	—		—		91	56
Perth Glory	2000–01	National Soccer League	28	19	—		—		—		28	19
Perth Glory	2001–02	National Soccer League	27	18	—		—		—		27	18
Perth Glory	2002–03	National Soccer League	31	24	—		—		—		31	24
Perth Glory	2003–04	National Soccer League	26	16	—		—		—		26	16
Perth Glory	Total		112	77	0	0	—		—		112	77
Adelaide City	2004	SA Premier League	18	11	0	0	—		—		18	11
Adelaide City	2005	SA Premier League	26	22	1	0	—		—		27	22
Adelaide City	Total		44	33	1	0	—		—		45	33
Perth Glory	2005–06	A-League	17	7	0	0	—		—		17	7
Adelaide City	2006	SA State League	18	13	5	4	—		—		23	17
Central Coast Mariners	2006–07	A-League	8	6	0	0	—		—		8	6
Queensland Roar	2006–07	A-League	8	2	0	0	—		—		8	2
Central Coast Mariners	2007–08	A-League	3	0	0	0	—		—		3	0
South Adelaide Panthers	2010	SA State League	4	2	—		—		—		4	2
Adelaide City	2011	SA Premier League	3	0	—		—		—		3	0
Career total			537	295	22	9	0	0	0	0	559	304

=== International ===
National team	Year	Competitive		Friendly		Total	
National team	Year	Apps	Goals	Apps	Goals	Apps	Goals
Australia U23	1991	3	0	2	2	5	2
Australia U23	1992	6	1	2	2	8	3
Australia U23	Total	9	1	4	4	13	5
Australia	1992	4	1	0	0	4	1
Australia	1993	0	0	4	1	4	1
Australia	1994	0	0	4	0	4	0
Australia	1995	2	1	3	0	5	1
Australia	1996	3	2	4	1	7	3
Australia	1997	7	6	2	0	9	6
Australia	1998	4	10	1	0	5	10
Australia	1999	0	0	0	0	0	0
Australia	2000	0	0	0	0	0	0
Australia	2001	3	4	0	0	3	4
Australia	2002	4	3	0	0	4	3
Total		27	27	18	2	45	29
Career total		36	28	22	6	58	34

Scores and results list Australia's goal tally first, score column indicates score after each Mori goal.

List of international goals scored by Damian Mori
No.	Date	Venue	Opponent	Score	Result	Competition
1	11 September 1992	Stade Pater, Papeete, Tahiti	Tahiti	1–0	3–0	1994 FIFA World Cup qualification
2	24 September 1993	Dongdaemun Stadium, Seoul, South Korea	South Korea	1–1	1–1	Friendly
3	15 November 1995	Breakers Stadium, Newcastle, Australia	New Zealand	1–0	3–0	Trans-Tasman Cup
4	14 February 1996	Lakeside Stadium, Melbourne, Australia	Japan	1–0	3–0	Friendly
5	14 September 1996	Kings Park Stadium, Durban, South Africa	Ghana	1–0	2–0	Friendly
6	21 September 1996	Loftus Versfeld, Pretoria, South Africa	Kenya	3–0	4–0	Friendly
7	11 June 1997	Parramatta Stadium, Sydney, Australia	Solomon Islands	1–0	13–0	1998 FIFA World Cup qualification
8	11 June 1997	Parramatta Stadium, Sydney, Australia	Solomon Islands	2–0	13–0	1998 FIFA World Cup qualification
9	11 June 1997	Parramatta Stadium, Sydney, Australia	Solomon Islands	4–0	13–0	1998 FIFA World Cup qualification
10	11 June 1997	Parramatta Stadium, Sydney, Australia	Solomon Islands	6–0	13–0	1998 FIFA World Cup qualification
11	11 June 1997	Parramatta Stadium, Sydney, Australia	Solomon Islands	9–0	13–0	1998 FIFA World Cup qualification
12	12 December 1997	King Fahd Stadium, Riyadh, Saudi Arabia	Mexico	3–1	3–1	1997 FIFA Confederations Cup
13	25 September 1998	Suncorp Stadium, Brisbane, Australia	Fiji	1–0	3–1	1998 OFC Nations Cup
14	25 September 1998	Suncorp Stadium, Brisbane, Australia	Fiji	2–0	3–1	1998 OFC Nations Cup
15	25 September 1998	Suncorp Stadium, Brisbane, Australia	Fiji	3–0	3–1	1998 OFC Nations Cup
16	28 September 1998	Suncorp Stadium, Brisbane, Australia	Cook Islands	2–0	16–0	1998 OFC Nations Cup
17	28 September 1998	Suncorp Stadium, Brisbane, Australia	Cook Islands	4–0	16–0	1998 OFC Nations Cup
18	28 September 1998	Suncorp Stadium, Brisbane, Australia	Cook Islands	6–0	16–0	1998 OFC Nations Cup
19	28 September 1998	Suncorp Stadium, Brisbane, Australia	Cook Islands	7–0	16–0	1998 OFC Nations Cup
20	2 October 1998	Suncorp Stadium, Brisbane, Australia	Tahiti	1–0	4–1	1998 OFC Nations Cup
21	2 October 1998	Suncorp Stadium, Brisbane, Australia	Tahiti	2–0	4–1	1998 OFC Nations Cup
22	2 October 1998	Suncorp Stadium, Brisbane, Australia	Tahiti	3–1	4–1	1998 OFC Nations Cup
23	9 April 2001	BCU International Stadium, Coffs Harbour, Australia	Tonga	2–0	22–0	2002 FIFA World Cup qualification
24	9 April 2001	BCU International Stadium, Coffs Harbour, Australia	Tonga	5–0	22–0	2002 FIFA World Cup qualification
25	9 April 2001	BCU International Stadium, Coffs Harbour, Australia	Tonga	8–0	22–0	2002 FIFA World Cup qualification
26	9 April 2001	BCU International Stadium, Coffs Harbour, Australia	Tonga	12–0	22–0	2002 FIFA World Cup qualification
27	6 July 2002	Ericsson Stadium, Auckland, New Zealand	Vanuatu	1–0	2–0	2002 OFC Nations Cup
28	8 July 2002	Ericsson Stadium, Auckland, New Zealand	New Caledonia	4–0	11–0	2002 OFC Nations Cup
29	14 July 2002	Ericsson Stadium, Auckland, New Zealand	Tahiti	2–1	2–1	2002 OFC Nations Cup

== Honours ==
South Melbourne

- NSL Cup: 1989–90

Adelaide City

- NSL Championship: 1993–94

Perth Glory

- NSL Championship: 2002–03, 2003–04

Australia

- FIFA Confederations Cup: runner-up, 1997
- OFC Nations Cup: 1996; runner-up, 1998, 2002

Individual:

- Johnny Warren Medal: 1995–96, 2002–03
- NSL top scorer: 1995–96 (31 goals), 1997–98 (19 goals), 1999–2000 (22 goals), 2001–02 (17 goals), 2002–03 (24 goals)
