= List of Perth Glory FC players (1–24 appearances) =

Perth Glory players with less than 25 appearances

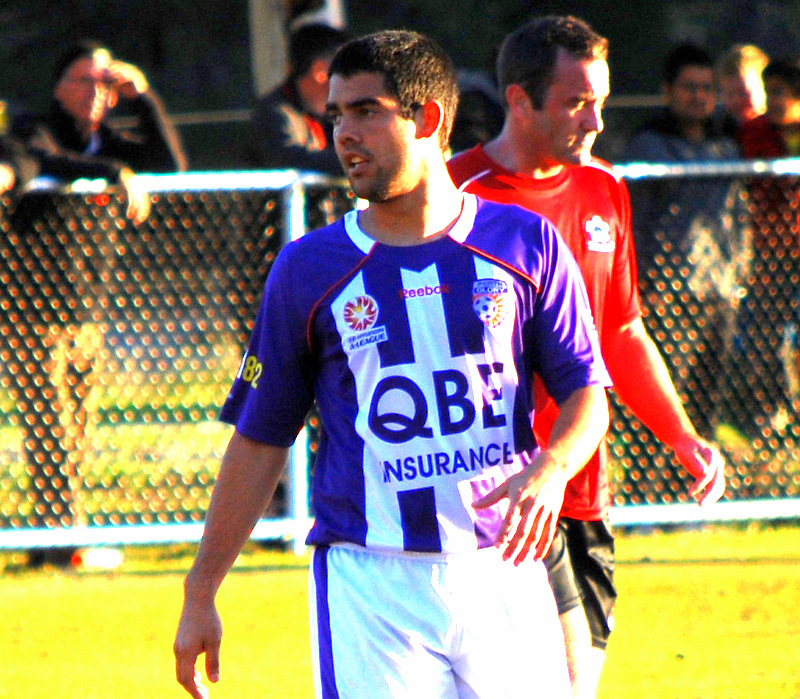
Andrija Jukic made 23 competitive appearances for Perth.

Perth Glory Football Club, an association football club based in Perth, was founded in 1996. They became the first and only Western Australian member admitted into the A-League Men in 2005, having spent their first eight seasons participating in the National Soccer League. The club's first team has competed in nationally and internationally organised competitions, and all players who have played between 1 and 24 such matches, either as a member of the starting eleven or as a substitute, are listed below.

Each player's details include the duration of his Perth Glory career, his typical playing position while with the club, and the number of games played and goals scored in all senior competitive matches.

Since Perth Glory's first competitive match, over 200 players have made a competitive first-team appearance for the club. Many of these players have spent only a short period of their career at Perth Glory before seeking opportunities in other teams; some players had their careers cut short by injury, while others left for other reasons. Storm Roux only played one match for Perth Glory but has gone on to have a successful career at Central Coast Mariners and Melbourne Victory; he has also won 10 caps for the New Zealand national team.

== Key ==
- The list is ordered first by date of debut, and then if necessary in alphabetical order.
- Appearances as a substitute are included.
- Statistics are correct up to and including the match played on 25 July 2024. Where a player left the club permanently after this date, his statistics are updated to his date of leaving.

Positions key
GK	Goalkeeper
DF	Defender
MF	Midfielder
FW	Forward

Nationality
Unless otherwise noted, the nationality of a player is determined by the country/countries which he has played for, or if said person has not played international football, their country of birth.
Position
Playing positions are listed according to the tactical formations that were employed at the time.
Club career
Club career is defined as the first and last calendar years in which the player appeared for the club in any of the competitions listed below.
Total appearances and Total goals
Total appearances and goals comprise those in the National Soccer League, A-League Men, Australia Cup, A-League Pre-Season Challenge Cup, AFC Champions League and the 2005 Australian Club World Championship Qualifying Tournament.

== Players ==
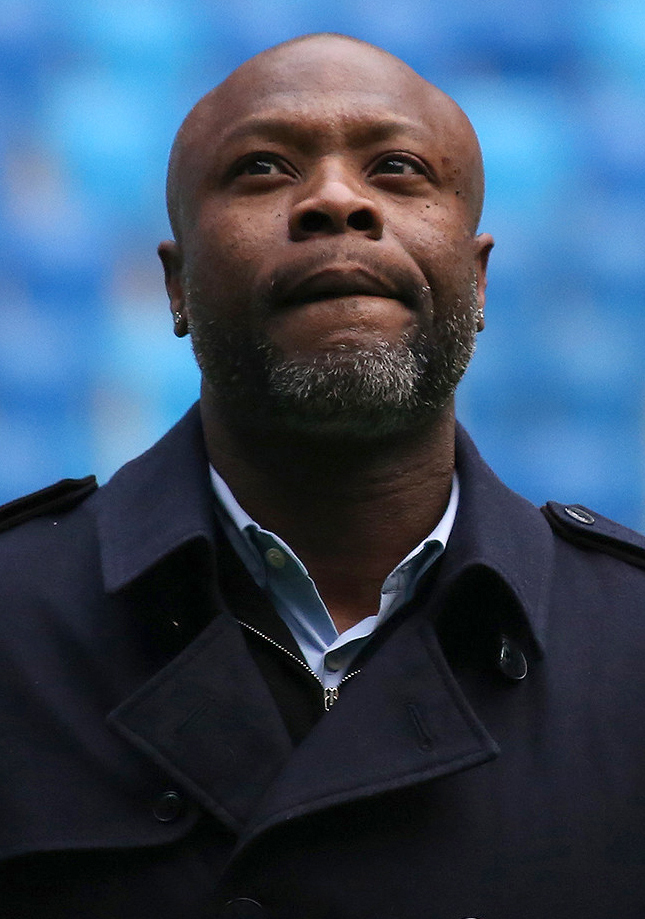
Frenchman William Gallas finished his professional career in Perth.

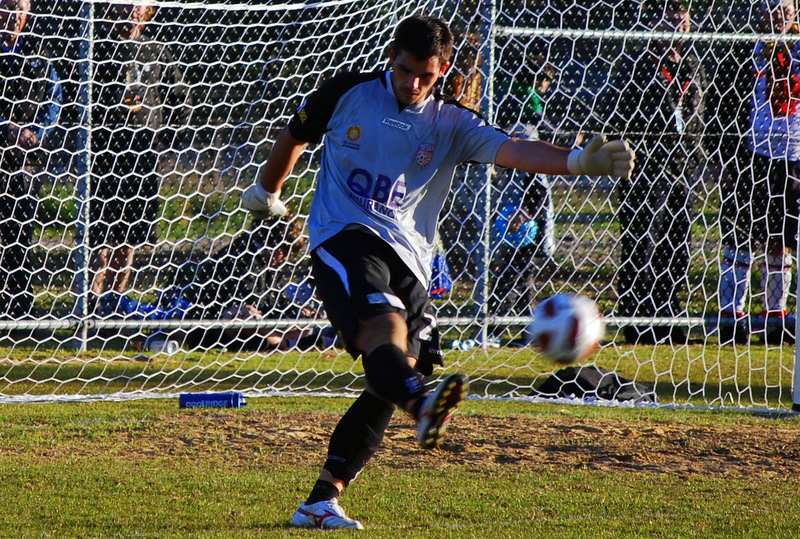
Aleks Vrteski played sixteen games for Perth Glory as a goalkeeper.

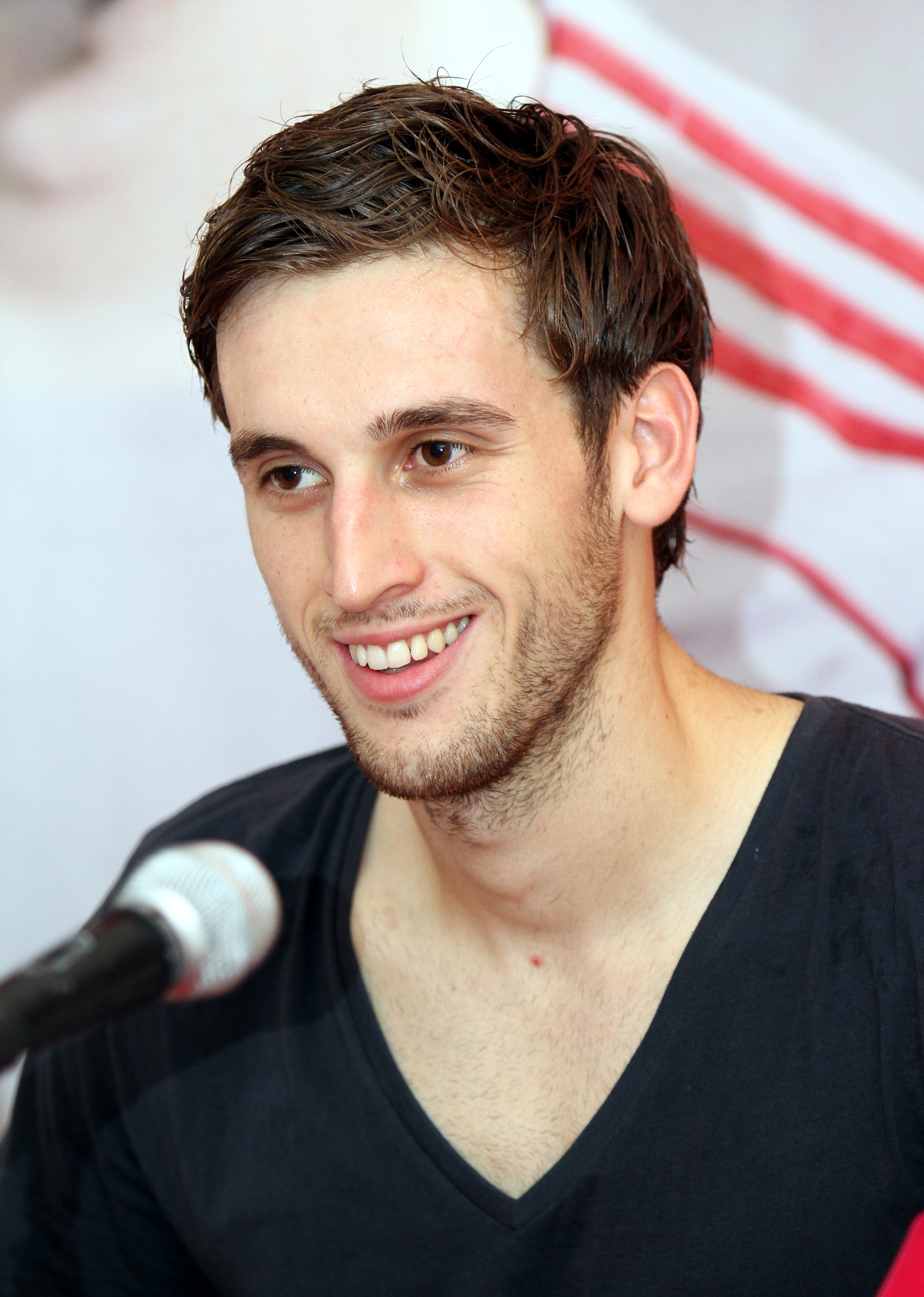
Australian international Matthew Spiranovic played 15 games for the Glory.

Players highlighted in bold are still actively playing at Perth Glory

List of Perth Glory FC players with between 1 and 24 appearances
Player	Nationality	Pos	Club career	Starts	Subs	Total	Goals	Ref.
Player	Nationality	Pos	Club career	Appearances			Goals	Ref.
Vladimir Beretovac	Australia	DF	1996–1997	7	8	15	0	
Doug Ithier	Australia	MF	1996–1997	9	6	15	0	
Alan MacKenzie	Scotland	FW	1996–1997	3	9	12	2	
Tom Maras	Australia	GK	1996–1997	19	1	20	0	
Vince Matassa	Australia	GK	1996–2004	14	0	14	0	
Peter Vukmirovic	Australia	DF	1996–1998	6	11	17	0	
Marc Wingell	Australia	MF	1997	0	2	2	0	
Robert Zabica	Australia	GK	1997	7	0	7	0	
Ernie Tapai	Australia	MF	1997–1998	13	2	15	2	
Samson Siasia	Nigeria	FW	1997–1998	21	1	22	3	
Peter Anosike	Nigeria	FW	1997	2	3	5	1	
Simon Harland	Australia	MF	1997	0	1	1	0	
John Markovski	Australia	FW	1998–1999	19	3	22	11	
Danny Milosevic	Australia	GK	1998–1999	17	0	17	0	
Vasko Trpcevski	Australia	MF	1999	0	4	4	0	
Gianfranco Circati	Italy	MF	1999	12	3	15	2	
Hamilton Thorp	Australia	FW	1999–2000	12	5	17	0	
Peter Buljan	Australia	FW	2000	7	14	21	1	
Aurelio Schwertz	Brazil	FW	2000	10	8	18	4	
Paul Roberts	Australia	MF	2000–2001	2	6	8	0	
Aaron Cole	Australia	DF	2001	0	1	1	0	
Todd Harnwell	Australia	DF	2001	0	2	2	0	
Antonio Naglieri	Australia	MF	2002	1	0	1	0	
Mohammed Mouhouti	Morocco	MF	2002	1	0	1	0	
Anthony Danze	Australia	MF	2003–2004; 2007	10	11	21	0	
Jade North	Australia	DF	2003–2004	22	0	22	0	
Wayne Srhoj	Australia	MF	2003–2004; 2008–2010	9	4	13	0	
Andrew Packer	Australia	DF	2004	1	4	5	0	
Shane Crampton	Australia	FW	2004	0	1	1	0	
Dean Apelgren	Australia	DF	2004	0	1	1	0	
Greg Sharland	Australia	DF	2004	1	0	1	0	
Hiroyuki Ishida	Japan	FW	2005–2006	10	12	22	1	
Milan Jovanic	Serbia	GK	2005	3	0	3	0	
Steve McMahon	England	MF	2005	11	5	16	0	
Neil Teggart	Northern Ireland	FW	2005	1	0	1	0	
Henry Fa'arodo	Solomon Islands	FW	2005–2006	6	9	15	0	
Brian Deane	England	FW	2005	6	1	7	1	
Ryan Townsend	Australia	DF	2006	6	1	7	0	
Josip Magdic	Australia	MF	2006–2007	2	7	9	1	
Mark Robertson	Australia	MF	2006	5	1	6	0	
Adrian Webster	New Zealand	MF	2006–2007	18	6	24	0	
Aleks Vrteski	Macedonia	GK	2006–2010	14	2	16	0	
Stan Lazaridis	Australia	DF	2006–2008	15	0	15	0	
Andrew Crews	Australia	GK	2006	1	0	1	0	
Jeremy Christie	New Zealand	MF	2006–2007	10	11	21	0	
Luka Glavas	Australia	FW	2006–2007	3	14	17	2	
Andy Petterson	Australia	GK	2006	1	0	1	0	
Mislav Saric	Australia	MF	2006–2007	6	6	12	1	
Tyler Simpson	Australia	DF	2006–2008	11	5	16	0	
Paul Pezos	Australia	MF	2006	1	2	3	0	
Tommi Tomich	Australia	GK	2006–2007	21	0	21	0	
Mark Lee	England	DF	2006–2008	12	1	13	0	
Mitchell Prentice	Australia	MF	2007	11	8	19	1	
Hayden Foxe	Australia	DF	2007–2008	11	0	11	0	
Mate Dragicevic	Croatia	MF	2007	7	2	9	1	
Jordan Simpson	Australia	MF	2007	3	3	6	1	
James Robinson	Australia	MF	2007–2008	20	3	23	2	
Jerry Karpeh	Australia	FW	2007–2008	1	6	7	0	
Hayden Doyle	Australia	DF	2008–2009	4	3	7	0	
Anthony Skorich	Australia	FW	2008–2011	4	14	18	1	
Adrian Trinidad	Argentina	MF	2008	8	9	17	2	
Eugene Dadi	Ivory Coast	MF	2008	18	6	24	10	
Frank Juric	Australia	GK	2008	6	0	6	0	
Brent Griffiths	Australia	MF	2008–2011	5	5	10	0	
Amaral	Brazil	MF	2008–2009	7	2	9	0	
Jeff Bright	Australia	MF	2008	1	1	2	0	
Stuart McLaren	Australia	DF	2008	2	0	2	0	
Marc Anthony	Scotland	MF	2008	4	2	6	0	
Andrija Jukic	Australia	MF	2008–2010	4	19	23	1	
Victor Sikora	Netherlands	FW	2008	19	4	23	4	
Dean Evans	Australia	DF	2009	0	1	1	0	
Matthew Mayora	Australia	FW	2009	0	4	4	0	
Ludovic Boi	Mauritius	FW	2009	0	1	1	0	
Howard Fondyke	Australia	MF	2010–2011	6	8	14	0	
Michael Baird	Australia	FW	2010	10	3	13	1	
Ryan Pearson	Australia	DF	2010	1	2	3	0	
Cameron Edwards	Australia	MF	2011–2014	5	8	13	0	
Trent McClenahan	Australia	DF	2011	5	0	5	0	
Evan Berger	Australia	DF	2011–2012	2	4	6	0	
Ndumba Makeche	Australia	FW	2012–2013	2	3	5	0	
Jesse Makarounas	Australia	FW	2012–2013	0	4	4	0	
Sam Mitchinson	Australia	DF	2012	0	1	1	0	
Adrian Zahra	Australia	MF	2012–2014	10	8	18	3	
Storm Roux	New Zealand	DF	2013	0	1	1	0	
Matías Córdoba	Argentina	MF	2013	6	2	8	1	
Ryan Edwards	Australia	MF	2013–2014	11	4	15	0	
Matthew Davies	Australia	DF	2013–2014	16	0	16	0	
William Gallas	France	DF	2013–2014	14	0	14	1	
Riley Woodcock	Australia	DF	2013–2015	11	3	14	0	
Isaka Cernak	Australia	MF	2013–2014	3	1	4	0	
Darvydas Sernas	Lithuania	FW	2014	2	8	10	1	
Jack Duncan	Australia	GK	2014–2015	7	0	7	0	
Youssouf Hersi	Netherlands	MF	2014	10	1	11	0	
Ruben Zadkovich	Australia	MF	2014–2015	9	6	15	1	
Dragan Paljic	Germany	FW	2015	6	6	12	0	
Denis Kramar	Slovenia	DF	2015	4	2	6	1	
Jacob Collard	Australia	DF	2015–2016	2	1	3	0	
Hagi Gligor	Australia	MF	2015–2016	4	7	11	1	
Jerrad Tyson	Australia	GK	2015	2	0	2	0	
Nick Feely	Australia	GK	2015–2018	2	3	5	0	
Guyon Fernandez	Netherlands	FW	2015	5	3	8	1	
Aryn Williams	Australia	DF	2015–2017	15	7	22	0	
Jamal Reiners	Australia	FW	2015–2016	4	14	18	0	
Joe Knowles	Australia	FW	2015–2018	7	11	18	1	
Kosta Petratos	Australia	MF	2016	1	8	9	0	
Krisztián Vadócz	Hungary	MF	2016	11	0	11	1	
Rhys Williams	Australia	DF	2016–2017	15	3	18	1	
Milan Smiljanic	Serbia	MF	2016–2017	10	6	16	0	
Lucian Goian	Romania	DF	2017	6	0	6	0	
Jacob Poscoliero	Australia	DF	2017–2018	6	3	9	0	
Xavi Torres	Spain	MF	2017–2018	23	1	24	4	
Mitchell Mallia	Australia	FW	2017	1	5	6	1	
Jeremy Walker	Australia	MF	2017–2018	13	0	13	0	
Jacob Italiano	Australia	FW	2017–2019	14	5	19	0	
Yagoub Mustafa	South Sudan	FW	2017	0	1	1	0	
Walter Scott	Australia	MF	2018	1	1	2	0	
Fábio Ferreira	Portugal	FW	2018–2019	7	7	14	2	
Brendon Santalab	Australia	FW	2018–2019	3	16	19	2	
Matthew Spiranovic	Australia	DF	2018–2019	15	0	15	0	
Kristian Popovic	Australia	MF	2019–2020	8	12	20	2	
Gabriel Popovic	Australia	FW	2019–2020	4	11	15	0	
Jacob Tratt	Australia	DF	2019–2020	5	11	16	0	
Kim Soo-beom	South Korea	DF	2019–2020	7	5	12	0	
Gregory Wüthrich	Switzerland	DF	2019–2020	19	0	19	1	
James Meredith	Australia	DF	2019–2020	18	5	23	1	
Tarek Elrich	Australia	DF	2020	6	4	10	0	
Vince Lia	Australia	MF	2020	0	4	4	0	
Bryce Bafford	Australia	FW	2020–2021	4	3	7	0	
Declan Hughes	Australia	MF	2020	3	1	4	0	
Nick Sullivan	Australia	MF	2020–2021	5	9	14	0	
Nicholas Walsh	Australia	DF	2020	3	1	4	0	
**Riley Warland**	Australia	DF	2021; 2023–	16	6	22	0	
Mason Tatafu	Australia	DF	2020–2021	3	2	5	0	
Jason Geria	Australia	DF	2021	13	0	13	0	
Sebastian Langkamp	Germany	DF	2021	2	0	2	0	
Aaron Calver	Australia	DF	2021–2022	8	2	10	0	
Brad Jones	Australia	GK	2021–2023	5	0	5	0	
Pacifique Niyongabire	Burundi	MF	2021–2022	8	10	18	0	
Adrián Sardinero	Spain	FW	2021–2023	12	4	16	0	
Daniel Sturridge	England	FW	2021–2022	1	5	6	0	
Joshua Anasmo	Australia	FW	2021–2023	3	7	10	1	
Aidan Coyne	Australia	DF	2021–2022	4	3	7	0	
Chris Donnell	Australia	MF	2021–2023	3	3	6	0	
Aidan Edwards	Australia	MF	2021–2022	2	2	4	0	
Joseph Forde	Australia	DF	2021–2024	9	11	20	0	
William Formston	Australia	DF	2021	1	0	1	0	
Matthew George	Australia	MF	2021	0	1	1	0	
Jayden Leader	Australia	MF	2021	0	1	1	0	
Michael McDougall	Australia	DF	2021	0	1	1	0	
Tyler Vecchio	Australia	FW	2021–2022	2	8	10	1	
Jacob Young	Australia	DF	2022–2023	0	2	2	0	
Nick Fitzgerald	Australia	MF	2022	12	1	13	0	
Darko Stanojević	Serbia	DF	2022	0	1	1	0	
Jayden Gorman	Australia	FW	2022–2024	2	5	7	0	
Aaron McEneff	Republic of Ireland	MF	2022–2024	11	5	16	3	
Zach Duncan	Australia	MF	2022–2023	8	16	24	1	
Matt Hatch	Australia	MF	2022–2023	0	3	3	0	
Ryan Williams	Australia	MF	2022–2023	24	0	24	4	
Ben Azubel	Israel	FW	2022	4	2	6	0	
Jacob Dowse	Australia	MF	2022–2023	1	16	17	0	
Keegan Jelacic	Australia	MF	2022–2023	21	2	22	1	
Jordan Elsey	Australia	DF	2022–2023	11	0	11	1	
**Oliver Sail**	New Zealand	GK	2023–	19	0	19	0	
**Joel Anasmo**	South Sudan	FW	2023–	1	11	12	1	
**Kaelan Majekodunmi**	Australia	DF	2023–	8	4	12	2	
Aleksandar Šušnjar	Australia	DF	2023–2024	21	0	21	2	
Oliver Bozanic	Australia	MF	2023–2024	9	0	9	1	
**Jarrod Carluccio**	Australia	MF	2023–	12	12	24	1	
**Khoa Ngo**	Australia	FW	2024–	1	2	3	0	
**Andriano Lebib**	Australia	DF	2024–	0	1	1	0	
**Lachlan Barr**	Australia	DF	2024–	1	0	1	0	
**Taras Gomulka**	Australia	MF	2024–	1	0	1	0	
**Abdelelah Faisal**	Australia	FW	2024–	1	0	1	2	
**Nathanael Blair**	Australia	FW	2024–	0	1	1	1	
**Jaylan Pearman**	Australia	MF	2024–	0	1	1	0	
**Royie Rahamin**	Australia	MF	2024–	0	1	1	0	

== See also ==
- List of Perth Glory FC (A-League Women) players
