= 1996–97 Perth Glory SC season =

Soccer team season

Perth Glory
1996–97 season
- Chairman: Nick Tana; Paul Afkos
- Head Coach: Gary Marocchi
- Stadium: Perth Oval
- National Soccer League: 7th
- Top goalscorer: Bobby Despotovski (14)
Home colours	Away colours

The 1996–97 season was Perth Glory's first season in the National Soccer League and first overall season in the top flight of Australian soccer.

== Background ==
After a number of years of speculation around a team from Perth, Perth businessmen, Nick Tana and Paul Afkos put in a bid to join the 1996–97 A-League (as the NSL was known after being relaunched for the 1995–96 season) in late 1995. Arena Investments, a company owned by Tana and Afkos, had stepped in to invest in the Perth Kangaroos IFC after the initial investors of the 1994 FAS Premier League champions pulled out. On 1 December 1995, the name Perth Glory was announced and is considered to be the club's foundation date.

== Review ==
=== Pre-season ===
To allow the club to prepare for their first season, the Glory were excused from participation in the 1996–97 National Cup in September and October 1996. Instead the Glory played a number of friendly matches, starting with a match against Italian team Sampdoria which they lost 3–0. This was the only match that the club lost in the leadup to the season, with a series of matches against Western Australian opposition all ending in wins to the Glory.

=== October ===
The league season began with a match against UTS Olympic at Perth Oval. The ground was ordinarily an Australian rules football ground so temporary seating was brought in to make a smaller arena for soccer. A crowd of 9639 saw the Glory lose 4–1 to Olympic, with Alan MacKenzie scoring a late consolation goal.

=== April ===
The Glory entered the final round of the season needing just one point to secure a finals position. However they were defeated 3–1 by the Melbourne Knights after being reduced to ten players, in front of a crowd of 10,000 at knights stadium.

== Players ==
Note: Flags indicate national team as defined under FIFA eligibility rules; some limited exceptions apply. Players may hold more than one non-FIFA nationality.

No.	Pos.	Nation	Player
6	DF	AUS	Gareth Naven
7	DF	AUS	Scott Miller
10	FW	AUS	Bobby Despotovski
—	DF	AUS	Vladimir Beretovac
—	DF	AUS	Vinko Buljubasic
—	MF	AUS	Anthony Carbone
—	MF	AUS	Doug Ithier
—	FW	AUS	Vasilio Kalogeracos
—	FW	SCO	Alan MacKenzie

No.	Pos.	Nation	Player
—	GK	AUS	Vince Matassa
—	GK	AUS	Tom Maras
—	DF	AUS	Craig Naven
—	FW	AUS	Paul Strudwick
—	DF	AUS	Peter Vukmirovic
—	MF	NZL	Gavin Wilkinson
—	DF	AUS	Dale Wingell
—	MF	AUS	Marc Wingell

== Transfers ==
=== Transfers in ===
No.	Position	Player	Transferred from	Type/fee	Date	Ref
—	DF	Vinko Buljubasic	Melbourne Knights	Undisclosed	July 1996	
10	FW	Bobby Despotovski	Gippsland Falcons	Undisclosed	July 1996	
—	FW	Doug Ithier	(Australia) Floreat Athena	Undisclosed	July 1996	
—	FW	Vasilios Kalogeracos	(Australia) Floreat Athena	Undisclosed	July 1996	
—	MF	Paul McVittie	(Australia) Stirling Lions	Undisclosed	July 1996	
7	DF	Scott Miller	Gippsland Falcons	Undisclosed	July 1996	
—	GK	Robert Zabica	(Australia) Cockburn City	Undisclosed	July 1996	

=== Transfers out ===
No.	Position	Player	Transferred to	Type/fee	Date	Ref
—	MF	Paul McVittie	(Australia) Inglewood United	Undisclosed	April 1997	
—	GK	Robert Zabica	(Australia) Cockburn City	Undisclosed	April 1997	

== Match results ==
=== Legend ===
Win	Draw	Loss

=== Preseason matches ===
Date	Opponents	Venue	Result	Scorers	Ref
31 May 1996	Sampdoria	WACA Ground	0–3		
5 September 1996	Swan IC	Ashfield Reserve	3–1	Nick Lazarevski (2), Bobby Despotovski	
8 September 1996	Floreat Athena	Lake Monger Velodrome	7–0	Bobby Despotovski (2), Gary Lees (2), Paul Strudwick, Scott Miller, Alex Novatsis (og)	
10 September 1996	Morley-Windmills	Ashfield Reserve	12–0	Bobby Despotovski (6), Nick Lazarevski (3), Paul Strudwick, Paul McVittie, Scott Miller	
14 September 1996	Inglewood Falcons		2–0	Scott Miller, Doug Ithier	
17 September 1996	Spearwood Dalmatinac	Ashfield Reserve	3–0	Bobby Despotovski, Spase Najdovski, Peter Vukrimovic	
22 September 1996	Sorrento	Kiev Sports Centre	6–0	Doug Ithier, Bobby Despotovski (3), Spase Najdovski, Paul McVittie	
26 September 1996	WA State Amateur team	Kiev Sports Centre	4–0	Dale Wingell, Paul McVittie, Vladimir Beretovac, Scott Miller	
30 September 1996	Bayswater Panthers all-stars	Bayswater Oval	3–0	Bobby Despotovski (2), Alan MacKenzie	
2 October 1996	WA State Amateur team	Ashfield Reserve	6–0	Alan MacKenzie (3), Bobby Despotovski (2), Dale Wingell	
6 October 1996	WA State team	Bayswater Oval	5–0	Paul Strudwick (2), Bobby Despotovski, Dale Wingell, Gareth Naven	

=== League results ===
Round	Date	Opponent	Venue	Result	Scorers	Attendance	Referee	Ref
1	13 October 1996	UTS Olympic	Home	1–4	Alan MacKenzie	9,639	Lennie	
2	20 October 1996	West Adelaide	Away	1–3	Paul Strudwick	3,527	Brazzale	
3	26 October 1996	Newcastle Breakers	Away	3–1	Paul Strudwick, Bobby Despotovski (2)	3,750	Micallef	
4	3 November 1996	Canberra Cosmos	Home	6–0	Paul McVittie, Bobby Despotovski (2), Dale Wingell, Gareth Naven, Scott Miller	8,053	Panella	
5	10 November 1996	Collingwood Warriors	Away	0–0		5,504	Dade	
6	16 November 1996	Gippsland Falcons	Home	2–3	Vas Kalogeracos, Paul Strudwick	6,299	Gorton	
7	23 November 1996	Sydney United	Away	2–4	Paul Strudwick, Vas Kalogeracos	3,450	Diomis	
8	1 December 1996	Adelaide City	Home	2–1	Gavin Wilkinson, Bobby Despotovski	9,765	Lennie	
9	7 December 1996	Brisbane Strikers	Away	5–1	Gavin Wilkinson, Bobby Despotovski (2), Vas Kalogeracos, Paul Strudwick	4,028	Shield	
10	14 December 1996	Wollongong City	Home	3–1	Paul Strudwick, Bobby Despotovski (2)	10,281	Lennie	
11	21 December 1996	South Melbourne	Away	0–1		7,896	Brazzale	
12	28 December 1996	Melbourne Knights	Home	3–2	Paul McVittie, Vas Kalogeracos, Scott Miller	14,759	Gorton	
13	4 January 1997	Marconi-Fairfield	Away	2–1	Vas Kalogeracos (2)	5,419	Micallef	
14	12 January 1997	Marconi-Fairfield	Home	1–1	Paul Strudwick	17,582	Brazzale	
15	2 February 1997	UTS Olympic	Away	2–0	David Barrett (og), Bobby Despotovski	7,124	Hugo	
16	9 February 1997	West Adelaide	Home	1–1	Vas Kalogeracos	15,737	Lennie	
17	15 February 1997	Newcastle Breakers	Home	0–2		11,546	Dade	
18	22 February 1997	Canberra Cosmos	Away	1–4	Bobby Despotovski	2,000	Brazzale	
19	2 March 1997	Collingwood Warriors	Home	0–2		10,964	Panella	
20	9 March 1997	Gippsland Falcons	Away	1–1	Alan MacKenzie	2,149	Diomis	
21	15 March 1997	Sydney United	Home	3–1	Vas Kalogeracos (2), Dale Wingell	11,644	Connolly	
22	23 March 1997	Adelaide City	Away	1–1	Bobby Despotovski	5,253	Micallef	
23	30 March 1997	Brisbane Strikers	Home	0–2		12,858	Dade	
24	6 April 1997	Wollongong City	Away	3–1	Bobby Despotovski (2), Gavin Wilkinson	3,158	Dade	
25	12 April 1997	South Melbourne	Home	4–0	Vas Kalogeracos (3), Con Blatsis (og)	15,197	Hugo	
26	20 April 1997	Melbourne Knights	Away	1–3	Tony Carbone	10,000	Micallef	

== Statistics ==
=== Leading goalscorers ===
- 14 – Bobby Despotovski
- 12 – Vas Kalogeracos

== Player details ==
List of squad players, including number of appearances by competition

Nat	Pos	Name	Appearances	Goals
(Australia)	GK	Vince Matassa	11	0
(Australia)	GK	Tom Maras	8	0
(Australia)	GK	Robert Zabica	7	0
(New Zealand)	DF	Gavin Wilkinson	24	3
(Australia)		Vladimir Beretovac	13	0
(Australia)		Vinko Buljubasic	25	0
(Australia)		Tony Carbone	8	1
(Australia)		Doug Ithier	12	0
(Australia)		Paul McVittie	25	2
(Australia)		Scott Miller	26	2
(Australia)	MF	Gareth Naven	25	1
(Australia)		Craig Naven	25	0
(Australia)		Paul Strudwick	23	7
(Australia)		Peter Vukrimovic	6	2
(Australia)		Dale Wingell	25	2
(Australia)		Marc Wingell	2	0
(Scotland)	FW	Alan MacKenzie	12	2
(Australia)	FW	Vasilios Kalogeracos	20	12
(Australia)	FW	Bobby Despotovski	23	14

Statistics accurate to end of 1996–97 NSL season
