= 2015–16 Perth Glory FC season =

Perth Glory
2015–16 season
- Chairman: Tony Sage
- Manager: Kenny Lowe
- Stadium: nib Stadium, Perth
- A-League: 5th
- A-League Finals Series: Elimination-finals
- FFA Cup: Runners-up
- Top goalscorer: League: Diego Castro (13 goals); All: Diego Castro (13 goals)
- Highest home attendance: 14,504 vs Melbourne City; 3 April 2016
- Lowest home attendance: 5,398 vs Melbourne Victory; 16 December 2015
- Average home league attendance: 8,986
Home colours	Away colours

The 2015–16 Perth Glory FC season was the club's 19th season since its establishment in 1996. The club participated in the A-League for the 11th time and the FFA Cup for the second time.

== Players ==
=== First team squad ===
Note: Flags indicate national team as defined under FIFA eligibility rules; some limited exceptions apply. Players may hold more than one non-FIFA nationality.

No.	Pos.	Nation	Player
1	GK	AUS	Ante Covic
2	DF	AUS	Alex Grant
3	DF	AUS	Marc Warren
4	DF	AUS	Shane Lowry
6	DF	AUS	Dino Djulbic
7	MF	HUN	György Sándor
8	MF	AUS	Ruben Zadkovich
9	FW	IRL	Andy Keogh
10	MF	SRB	Nebojša Marinković
11	FW	AUS	Richard Garcia (Captain)
12	GK	AUS	Jerrad Tyson

No.	Pos.	Nation	Player
13	MF	AUS	Diogo Ferreira
14	FW	AUS	Chris Harold
15	MF	AUS	Hagi Gligor
17	MF	ESP	Diego Castro
18	DF	AUS	Mitchell Oxborrow
19	DF	AUS	Josh Risdon
21	FW	AUS	Kosta Petratos
23	MF	HUN	Krisztián Vadócz (Injury replacement)
29	DF	AUS	Aryn Williams
30	GK	AUS	Jordan Thurtell
–	FW	AUS	Adam Taggart

=== Transfers in ===
No.	Pos.	Nat.	Name	Age	Moving from	Type	Transfer window	Ends	Transfer fee	Source
5	DF	(Australia)	Antony Golec	24	Free agent	Transfer	Pre-season	2017	Free	
2	DF	(Australia)	Alex Grant	21	Free agent	Transfer	Pre-season	2016	Free	
12	GK	(Australia)	Jerrad Tyson	25	Sun Pegasus (Hong Kong)	Transfer	Pre-season	2017	Free	
15	MF	(Australia)	Hagi Gligor	20	Free agent	Transfer	Pre-season	2016	Free	
1	GK	(Australia)	Ante Covic	40	Free agent	Transfer	Pre-season	2016	Free	
7	FW	(Hungary)	György Sándor	31	Free agent	Transfer	Pre-season	2017	Free	
3	DF	(Australia)	Marc Warren	23	APIA Leichhardt Tigers	Transfer	Pre-season	2016	Free	
17	MF	(Spain)	Diego Castro	33	Getafe (Spain)	Transfer	Pre-season	2016	Free	
20	FW	(Curaçao)	Guyon Fernandez	29	Free agent	Transfer	Pre-season	2016	Free	
29	DF	(Australia)	Aryn Williams	22	Free agent	Injury replacement	Round 4	2015	Free	
9	FW	(Republic of Ireland)	Andy Keogh	29	Free agent	Transfer	Round 10	2018	Free	
21	FW	(Australia)	Kosta Petratos	17	FFA Centre of Excellence	Transfer	Round 16	2017	Free	
	FW	(Australia)	Adam Taggart	22	Fulham (England)	Transfer	Round 17	2018		
4	DF	(Australia)	Shane Lowry	26	Free agent	Transfer	Round 17	2018	Free	
23	MF	(Hungary)	Krisztián Vadócz	30	Free agent	Injury replacement	Round 17	2016	Free	

=== Transfers out ===
No.	Pos.	Nat.	Name	Age	Moving to	Type	Transfer window	Transfer fee	Source
5	MF	(Australia)	Rostyn Griffiths	27		End of contract	Pre-season		
18	GK	(Australia)	Jack Duncan	22	Randers FC (Denmark)	Transfer	Pre-season		
7	MF	(Netherlands)	Youssouf Hersi	32		Released	Pre-season		
1	GK	(Australia)	Danny Vukovic	30		Released	Pre-season		
21	DF	(Australia)	Scott Jamieson	26	Western Sydney Wanderers	Transfer	Pre-season	Free	
15	FW	(Australia)	Jamie Maclaren	21		Released	Pre-season		
4	DF	(Australia)	Riley Woodcock	20		Released	Pre-season		
9	FW	(Republic of Ireland)	Andy Keogh	29		Released	Pre-season		
20	MF	(Australia)	Daniel De Silva	18	Roda JC (Netherlands)	Loan	Pre-season		
20	FW	(Curaçao)	Guyon Fernandez	29		Released	Round 14		
16	FW	(Brazil)	Sidnei	29		Released	Round 14		
5	DF	(Australia)	Antony Golec	25	Sheriff Tiraspol (Moldova)	Released	Round 15		
23	DF	(Australia)	Michael Thwaite	32	Liaoning Whowin (China)	Released	Round 16		
25	DF	(Australia)	Jacob Collard	20	Olympia	Released	Round 22		

== Technical staff ==
Position	Name
Head coach	(England) Kenny Lowe
Assistant coach	(England) Andrew Ord
Youth Team coach	(Australia) John Gibson
Goalkeeping Coach	(Australia) Danny Milosevic
Strength & Conditioning Coach	(Australia) Toby Horak
Physiotherapist	(Australia) Chris Hutchinson

== Statistics ==
=== Squad statistics ===
N	Pos.	Nat.	Name	Total					A-League					FFA Cup
N	Pos.	Nat.	Name	Apps	Goals	Yellow card	Second yellow card	Red card	Apps	Goals	Yellow card	Second yellow card	Red card	Apps	Goals	Yellow card	Second yellow card	Red card
1	GK	(Australia)	Ante Covic	31	0	1	0	0	28	0	1	0	0	3	0	0	0	0
2	DF	(Australia)	Alex Grant	23	1	3	0	1	20+2	1	3	0	1	0+1	0	0	0	0
3	DF	(Australia)	Marc Warren	27	0	10	0	0	22	0	9	0	0	4+1	0	1	0	0
4	DF	(Australia)	Shane Lowry	12	1	5	0	0	12	1	5	0	0	0	0	0	0	0
6	DF	(Australia)	Dino Djulbic	15	0	2	1	0	4+6	0	0	1	0	5	0	2	0	0
7	MF	(Hungary)	György Sándor	28	5	3	0	0	24	4	2	0	0	4	1	1	0	0
8	MF	(Australia)	Ruben Zadkovich	0	0	0	0	0	0	0	0	0	0	0	0	0	0	0
9	FW	(Republic of Ireland)	Andy Keogh	15	10	3	0	0	14+1	10	3	0	0	0	0	0	0	0
10	MF	(Serbia)	Nebojša Marinković	25	5	2	0	0	19+1	3	2	0	0	5	2	0	0	0
11	FW	(Australia)	Richard Garcia	30	2	3	1	0	17+9	2	3	1	0	4	0	0	0	0
12	GK	(Australia)	Jerrad Tyson	2	0	0	0	1	0	0	0	0	0	2	0	0	0	1
13	MF	(Australia)	Diogo Ferreira	17	0	2	0	0	14	0	2	0	0	1+2	0	0	0	0
14	FW	(Australia)	Chris Harold	29	9	3	0	0	23+2	7	3	0	0	4	2	0	0	0
15	MF	(Australia)	Hagi Gligor	11	1	1	0	0	3+5	1	1	0	0	1+2	0	0	0	0
17	MF	(Spain)	Diego Castro	29	13	3	0	0	23+3	13	3	0	0	3	0	0	0	0
18	DF	(Australia)	Mitchell Oxborrow	22	1	5	0	0	6+13	1	5	0	0	2+1	0	0	0	0
19	DF	(Australia)	Josh Risdon	28	0	6	0	0	23	0	4	0	0	5	0	2	0	0
20	GK	(Australia)	Nick Feely	1	0	0	0	0	0	0	0	0	0	0+1	0	0	0	0
21	FW	(Australia)	Kosta Petratos	7	0	0	0	0	0+7	0	0	0	0	0	0	0	0	0
22	MF	(Australia)	Slobodan Vulin	0	0	0	0	0	0	0	0	0	0	0	0	0	0	0
23	MF	(Hungary)	Krisztián Vadócz	11	1	3	0	0	11	1	3	0	0	0	0	0	0	0
24	FW	(Australia)	Jamal Reiners	16	0	1	0	0	4+12	0	1	0	0	0	0	0	0	0
28	FW	(Australia)	Joe Knowles	4	0	0	0	0	1+3	0	0	0	0	0	0	0	0	0
29	DF	(Australia)	Aryn Williams	15	0	2	1	0	11+4	0	2	1	0	0	0	0	0	0
30	GK	(Australia)	Jordan Thurtell	0	0	0	0	0	0	0	0	0	0	0	0	0	0	0
31	MF	(Australia)	Ross Millard	0	0	0	0	0	0	0	0	0	0	0	0	0	0	0
	FW	(Australia)	Adam Taggart	0	0	0	0	0	0	0	0	0	0	0	0	0	0	0
Players no longer at the club:
5	DF	(Australia)	Antony Golec	10	0	1	0	0	6	0	1	0	0	3+1	0	0	0	0
16	FW	(Brazil)	Sidnei	13	3	2	0	0	5+3	2	1	0	0	3+2	1	1	0	0
20	FW	(Curaçao)	Guyon Fernandez	8	1	3	0	0	3+2	1	2	0	0	2+1	0	1	0	0
21	FW	(Australia)	Stefan Valentini	2	0	0	0	0	0	0	0	0	0	0+2	0	0	0	0
23	DF	(Australia)	Michael Thwaite	17	0	2	0	0	13	0	2	0	0	4	0	0	0	0
25	DF	(Australia)	Jacob Collard	3	0	0	1	0	2	0	0	1	0	0+1	0	0	0	0

- Last updated: 21 April 2016
- Source: au.soccerway.com
- (yellow card) = Number of bookings; (second yellow card) = Number of sending offs after a second yellow card; (red card) = Number of sending offs by a direct red card.

== Pre-season and friendlies ==
22 July 2015	Cockburn City (Australia)	0–1	(Australia) Perth Glory	Perth
		Report	R. Garcia 5'	Stadium: Dalmatinac Park

28 July 2015	Inglewood United (Australia)	0–4	(Australia) Perth Glory	Perth
		Report	Oxborrow (?); Harold (?); Valentini (?)	Stadium: Dalmatinac Park

19 August 2015 Call to Arms Cup	Perth Glory (Australia)	1–0	(Western Australia) WA State Team	Perth
	Marinković 27'	Report		Stadium: Dorrien Gardens; Attendance: ~800; Referee: David Bruce

== Competitions ==
=== Overview ===
Competition	First match	Last match	Starting round	Final position	Record							
Competition	First match	Last match	Starting round	Final position	Pld	W	D	L	GF	GA	GD	Win %
A-League	10 October 2015	10 April 2016	Matchday 1	5th	27	13	4	10	49	42	+7	48.15
A-League Finals	17 April 2016		Elimination-finals	Elimination-finals	1	0	0	1	0	2	−2	0.00
FFA Cup	4 August 2015	21 October 2015	Round of 32	Semi-finals	5	2	2	1	7	6	+1	40.00
Total					33	15	6	12	56	50	+6	45.45

Source: Competitions

=== A-League ===
==== League table ====
Pos	Team	Pld	W	D	L	GF	GA	GD	Pts	Qualification
1	Adelaide United (C)	27	14	7	6	45	28	+17	49	Qualification for 2017 AFC Champions League group stage and Finals series
2	Western Sydney Wanderers	27	14	6	7	44	33	+11	48	Qualification for 2017 AFC Champions League group stage and Finals series
3	Brisbane Roar	27	14	6	7	49	40	+9	48	Qualification for 2017 AFC Champions League second preliminary round and Finals series
4	Melbourne City	27	13	5	9	63	44	+19	44	Qualification for Finals series
5	Perth Glory	27	13	4	10	49	42	+7	43	Qualification for Finals series
6	Melbourne Victory	27	11	8	8	40	33	+7	41	Qualification for Finals series
7	Sydney FC	27	8	10	9	36	36	0	34	
8	Newcastle Jets	27	8	6	13	28	41	−13	30	
9	Wellington Phoenix (Note: Wellington Phoenix cannot qualify for the AFC Champions League as they are not recognised as an AFC club.)	27	7	4	16	34	54	−20	25	
10	Central Coast Mariners	27	3	4	20	33	70	−37	13	

Source: A-Leagues
Rules for classification: 1) points; 2) goal difference; 3) number of goals scored.
(C) Champions

==== Results summary ====
Overall								Home						Away					
Pld	W	D	L	GF	GA	GD	Pts	W	D	L	GF	GA	GD	W	D	L	GF	GA	GD
27	13	4	10	49	42	+7	43	8	3	2	30	18	+12	5	1	8	19	24	−5

Last updated: 11 April 2016.
Source: ultimatealeague.com

==== Results by round ====
Round	1	2	3	4	5	6	7	8	9	10	11	12	13	14	15	16	17	18	19	20	21	22	23	24	25	26	27
Ground	A	H	H	A	H	A	H	A	A	H	H	A	A	H	H	A	H	A	A	H	A	H	H	A	A	H	A
Result	L	L	W	L	W	L	D	L	L	W	D	D	L	L	D	W	W	W	W	W	L	W	W	W	W	W	L
Position	8	10	7	8	9	9	9	9	10	9	8	9	9	9	9	7	7	7	7	7	7	6	5	5	5	5	5

Updated to match(es) played on 11 April 2016. Source: ultimatealeague.com
A = Away; H = Home; W = Win; D = Draw; L = Loss

==== Matches ====
10 October 2015 1	Central Coast Mariners	3–2	Perth Glory	Gosford
17:15 AEDT	O'Donovan 9'; F. Ferreira 58' (pen.), 67' (pen.)	Report	R. Garcia 23'; Sándor 90+3'	Stadium: Central Coast Stadium; Attendance: 8,073; Referee: Strebre Delovski

18 October 2015 2	Perth Glory	1–2	Wellington Phoenix	Perth
16:00 AWST	Sándor 7'; R. Garcia (yellow card) 72' (yellow-red card) 84'	Report	Krishna 9'; Lia 89'	Stadium: nib Stadium; Attendance: 8,145; Referee: Stephen Lucas

25 October 2015 3	Perth Glory	3–1	Adelaide United	Perth
16:00 AWST	Sidnei 44'; Fernandez 60'; Castro 72'		D. Ferreira 74' (o.g.)	Stadium: nib Stadium; Attendance: 7,728; Referee: Adam Fielding

1 November 2015 4	Western Sydney Wanderers	1–0	Perth Glory	Parramatta
17:00 AEDT	Vidošić 45'	Report		Stadium: Pirtek Stadium; Attendance: 14,194; Referee: Matthew Conger

16 December 2015 5	Perth Glory	1–0	Melbourne Victory	Perth
18:00 AWST	Castro 74'	Report		Stadium: nib Stadium; Attendance: 5,398; Referee: Chris Beath

15 November 2015 6	Brisbane Roar	1–0	Perth Glory	Brisbane
16:00 AEST	Henrique 74'	Report		Stadium: Suncorp Stadium; Attendance: 11,748; Referee: Shaun Evans

21 November 2015 7	Perth Glory	0–0	Sydney FC	Perth
16:30 AWST		Report		Stadium: nib Stadium; Attendance: 6,976; Referee: Jarred Gillett

26 November 2015 8	Melbourne City	5–1	Perth Glory	Melbourne
19:40 AEDT	Paartalu 6'; Chapman 19'; Fornaroli 35'; Novillo 53'; Mooy 82' (pen.)	Report	Sidnei 45+2'; A. Williams (yellow card) 75' (yellow-red card) 82'	Stadium: AAMI Park; Attendance: 5,953; Referee: Kris Griffiths-Jones

6 December 2015 9	Adelaide United	1–0	Perth Glory	Adelaide
19:00 ACDT	Sánchez 3'	Report		Stadium: Coopers Stadium; Attendance: 6,205; Referee: Stephen Lucas

12 December 2015 10	Perth Glory	2–1	Central Coast Mariners	Perth
18:40 AWST	Marinković 62', 64'	Report	O'Donovan 28'	Stadium: nib Stadium; Attendance: 5,590; Referee: Ben Williams

19 December 2015 11	Perth Glory	2–2	Western Sydney Wanderers	Perth
18:40 AWST	Castro 2' (pen.); Oxborrow 60'	Report	Šantalab 20'; Nichols 81'	Stadium: nib Stadium; Attendance: 7,409; Referee: Jarred Gillett

27 December 2015 12	Melbourne Victory	1–1	Perth Glory	Melbourne
17:00 AEDT	Berisha 25' (pen.)	Report	Castro 74' (pen.)	Stadium: AAMI Park; Attendance: 22,544; Referee: Shaun Evans

2 January 2016 13	Brisbane Roar	2–1	Perth Glory	Brisbane
16:15 AEST	Maclaren 52'; Henrique 61'	Report	Gligor 70'	Stadium: Suncorp Stadium; Attendance: 17,696; Referee: Chris Beath

9 January 2016 14	Perth Glory	1–3	Adelaide United	Perth
18:40 AWST	Elrich 6' (o.g.); A. Grant (red card) 45'	Report	Cirio 27'; Carrusca 47'; Goodwin 90+4'	Stadium: nib Stadium; Attendance: 9,009; Referee: Strebre Delovski

16 January 2016 15	Perth Glory	2–2	Melbourne City	Perth
18:40 AWST	Castro 45+2'; Harold 60'; Collard (yellow card) 30' (yellow-red card) 63'	Report	Paartalu 31'; Mooy 47'	Stadium: nib Stadium; Attendance: 7,021; Referee: Ben Williams

24 January 2016 16	Newcastle Jets	1–6	Perth Glory	Newcastle
17:00 AEDT	Trifunović 14'; Boogaard (yellow card) 34' (yellow-red card) 45+1'	Report	Harold 24', 54'; Castro 45', 88'; D. Mullen 48' (pen.); A. Grant 74'	Stadium: Hunter Stadium; Attendance: 9,403; Referee: Shaun Evans

30 January 2016 17	Perth Glory	3–2	Melbourne Victory	Perth
18:40 AWST	Keogh 27'; Castro 29', 82' (pen.)	Report	Berisha 44', 69'; Ben Khalfallah (red card) 57'	Stadium: nib Stadium; Attendance: 10,501; Referee: Kris Griffiths-Jones

7 February 2016 18	Wellington Phoenix	0–1	Perth Glory	Wellington
17:00 NZDT		Report	Harold 21'	Stadium: Westpac Stadium; Attendance: 7,135; Referee: Jarred Gillett

13 February 2016 19	Sydney FC	1–2	Perth Glory	Sydney
17:15 AEDT	Smeltz 79'	Report	Keogh 23'; Harold 65'	Stadium: Allianz Stadium; Attendance: 11,559; Referee: Ben Williams

20 February 2016 20	Perth Glory	6–3	Brisbane Roar	Perth
18:40 AWST	Keogh 5'; Harold 32'; Marinković 38'; Lowry 41'; Castro 49' (pen.); R. Garcia 86'	Report	Maclaren 17'; D. Petratos 28'; North 36'	Stadium: nib Stadium; Attendance: 12,156; Referee: Strebre Delovski

26 February 2016 21	Western Sydney Wanderers	2–1	Perth Glory	Parramatta
19:40 AWST	Castelen 62'; Šantalab 85'	Report	Keogh 64' (pen.)	Stadium: Pirtek Stadium; Attendance: 12,639; Referee: Strebre Delovski

7 March 2016 22	Perth Glory	2–0	Newcastle Jets	Perth
17:00 AWST	Keogh 37'; Sándor 46'	Report	D. Mullen (yellow card) 45' (yellow-red card) 58'	Stadium: nib Stadium; Attendance: 11,260; Referee: Chris Beath

12 March 2016 23	Perth Glory	4–0	Central Coast Mariners	Perth
18:40 AWST	Castro 4' (pen.); Keogh 53', 67' (pen.); Harold 90+4'	Report	Austin (yellow card) 37' (yellow-red card) 49'; L. García (yellow card) 51' (yellow-red card) 54'	Stadium: nib Stadium; Attendance: 11,127; Referee: Adam Fielding

20 March 2016 24	Wellington Phoenix	1–2	Perth Glory	Wellington
17:00 NZDT	Doyle 90+2'	Report	Keogh 36'; Castro 74'	Stadium: Westpac Stadium; Attendance: 5,844; Referee: Ben Williams

26 March 2016 25	Newcastle Jets	1–2	Perth Glory	Newcastle
17:15 AEDT	~~Boogaard (red card) 87'~~ (expunged); Poljak 90+2' (pen.)	Report	Vadócz 72'; Keogh 88' (pen.); Djulbic (yellow card) 85' (yellow-red card) 90+1'	Stadium: Hunter Stadium; Attendance: 7,569; Referee: Kris Griffiths-Jones

3 April 2016 26	Perth Glory	3–2	Melbourne City	Perth
17:00 AWST	Keogh 55'; Sándor 67'; Castro 71'	Report	Fornaroli 73'; Marino 90+2'	Stadium: nib Stadium; Attendance: 14,504; Referee: Shaun Evans

10 April 2016 27	Sydney FC	4–0	Perth Glory	Sydney
17:00 AEST	Carney 30'; Hološko 36' (yellow card) 55' (yellow-red card) 78'; Abbas 85'; Ninković 90+1'	Report		Stadium: Allianz Stadium; Attendance: 8,717; Referee: Ben Williams

==== Finals series ====
17 April 2016 Elimination-finals	Melbourne City	2–0	Perth Glory	Melbourne
17:00 AEST	Fornaroli 40', 76'	Report		Stadium: AAMI Park; Attendance: 11,273; Referee: Chris Beath

=== FFA Cup ===
11 August 2015 Round of 32	Newcastle Jets (New South Wales)	2–2 (a.e.t.) (3–4 p)	(Western Australia) Perth Glory	Newcastle
19:30 AEST	Carney 24'; Haliti 115'	Report	Sidnei 87'; Marinković 92'	Stadium: Magic Park; Attendance: 2,563; Referee: Shaun Evans
	Penalties
	Haliti (penalty missed); Poljak (penalty scored); Ki-je (penalty scored); Carney (penalty missed); Hoffman (penalty scored); Alivodić (penalty missed)		(penalty scored) Marinković; (penalty scored) Valentini; (penalty missed) Harold; (penalty scored) Golec; (penalty missed) Djulbic; (penalty scored) Sándor

26 August 2015 Round of 16	Queensland Lions	0–1 (a.e.t.)	(Western Australia) Perth Glory	Brisbane
19:30 AEST			Harold 116'	Stadium: Perry Park; Attendance: 2,550; Referee: Peter Green

29 September 2015 Quarter-finals	Perth Glory (Western Australia)	1–1 (a.e.t.) (4–2 p)	(New South Wales) Western Sydney Wanderers	Perth
18:30 AWST	Marinković 59'	Report	Dimas 41'	Stadium: Dorrien Gardens; Attendance: 3,003; Referee: Stephen Lucas
	Penalties
	Marinković (penalty scored); Golec (penalty scored); Sidnei (penalty scored); R. Garcia (penalty scored)		(penalty scored) Vidošić; (penalty missed) Piovaccarli; (penalty scored) Andreu; (penalty missed) Jamieson

21 October 2015 Semi-finals	Perth Glory (Western Australia)	3–1	(Victoria (state)) Melbourne City	Perth
18:30 AWST	Sándor 24'; Garuccio 45+3' (o.g.); Harold 72'	Report	Millar 43'	Stadium: nib Stadium; Attendance: 4,165; Referee: Shaun Evans

7 November 2015 Final	Melbourne Victory (Victoria (state))	2–0	(Western Australia) Perth Glory	Melbourne
19:30 AEDT	Bozanic 35'; Berisha 42'	Report		Stadium: AAMI Park; Attendance: 15,098; Referee: Ben Williams

== See also ==
- 2015–16 Perth Glory FC (W-League) season
