= 2002–03 Perth Glory SC season =

Perth Glory
2002–03 National Soccer League season
- Chairman: Nick Tana
- Head coach: Mich d'Avray
- Stadium: Perth Oval
- National Soccer League: Runners-up
- Finals series: Champion
- Top goalscorer: Damian Mori (24)
- Highest home attendance: 13,517 (regular season); 38,111 (finals series)
- Lowest home attendance: 7,595 (regular season); 6,437 (finals series)

The 2002–03 Perth Glory SC season was the club's seventh season after joining the National Soccer League (NSL) in 1996. Perth Glory finished second in the regular season before winning the championship playoff to qualify for the 2003 NSL Grand Final. The Glory won the grand final to finish the season as champions.

== Club administration ==
In September, minority owner Paul Afkos sold his share of the club, leaving Nick Tana as majority owner alongside David Rodwell.

In November, the club announced that Future Glory, the club's youth team would not participate in the 2003 Soccer West Coast Premier League.

== Review and events ==
=== September ===
The Glory opened the season with a 2–0 win over Parramatta Power in Sydney. This result was later reversed and a 3–0 win awarded to the Power.

== Match results ==
=== NSL regular season ===
Perth Glory's score is shown first in each case.

Perth Glory in the 2002–03 National Soccer League regular season
Date	Venue	Opponents	Score	Perth Glory scorers	Att.	Ref.
21 September 2002	Parramatta Stadium, Sydney (A)	Parramatta Power	0–3	~~Horsley, Despotovski~~	4,155	
29 September 2002	Perth Oval, Perth (H)	Brisbane Strikers	3–4	Hassell, Mori (2)	10,573	
6 October 2002	Ericsson Stadium, Auckland (A)	Football Kingz	1–0	Mori	3,282	
13 October 2002	Perth Oval, Perth (H)	Newcastle United	1–0	Mori	10,448	
20 October 2002	Bob Jane Stadium, Melbourne (A)	South Melbourne	0–2		6,194	
27 October 2002	Perth Oval, Perth (H)	Sydney United	2–0	Mori (2)	7,595	
1 November 2002	North Sydney Oval, Sydney (A)	Northern Spirit	3–1	Hassell, Miller, Mori	2,918	
17 November 2002	Perth Oval, Perth (H)	Wollongong Wolves	3–1	Hassell (2), Mrdja	12,801	
24 November 2002	Toyota Park, Sydney (A)	Olympic Sharks	1–2	Hassell	5,020	
1 December 2002	Perth Oval, Perth (H)	Adelaide Force	1–0	Hassell	9,687	
8 December 2002	Knights Stadium, Melbourne (A)	Melbourne Knights	4–1	Mrdja, Mori (2), Hassell	4,770	
15 December 2002	Perth Oval, Perth (H)	Marconi-Fairfield	3–0	Mori (3)	8,903	
21 December 2002	Ballymore Stadium, Brisbane (A)	Brisbane Strikers	1–1	Despotovski	2,283	
29 December 2002	Perth Oval, Perth (H)	Parramatta Power	2–1	Miller, Tarka	9,203	
4 January 2003	Perth Oval, Perth (H)	Football Kingz	5–0	Horsley, Pryce, Despotovski, Gumprecht (2)	10,092	
10 January 2003	Energy Australia Stadium, Newcastle (A)	Newcastle United	1–0	Mrdja	6,125	
18 January 2003	Perth Oval, Perth (H)	South Melbourne	2–0	Gumprecht, Despotovski	11,173	
26 January 2003	Sydney United Sports Centre, Sydney (A)	Sydney United	1–1	Edgar Aldrighi Júnior	2,021	
1 February 2003	Perth Oval, Perth (H)	Northern Spirit	3–0	Mori (2), Caceres	9,979	
16 February 2003	WIN Stadium, Wollongong (A)	Wollongong Wolves	6–1	Despotovski (2) Mori, Caceres (2), Mrdja	3,132	
22 February 2003	Perth Oval, Perth (H)	Olympic Sharks	0–1		13,517	
28 February 2003	Hindmarsh Stadium, Adelaide (A)	Adelaide Force	2–0	Harnwell, Mori	3,677	
8 March 2003	Perth Oval, Perth (H)	Melbourne Knights	3–1	Horsley, Despotovski, Mrdja	9,176	
16 March 2003	Marconi Stadium, Sydney (A)	Marconi-Fairfield	0–2		9,176	

=== NSL championship playoff ===
Perth Glory's score is shown first in each case.

Perth Glory in the 2002–03 National Soccer League championship playoff
Date	Venue	Opponents	Score	Perth Glory scorers	Att.	Ref.
22 March 2003	Perth Oval, Perth (H)	Northern Spirit	5–0	Despotovski (4), Caceres	6,437	
30 March 2003	Parramatta Stadium, Sydney (A)	Parramatta Power	1–2	Harnwell	2,214	
5 April 2003	Perth Oval, Perth (H)	Adelaide Force	3–1	Mori, Hassell, Despotovski	10,292	
13 April 2003	Toyota Park, Sydney (A)	Olympic Sharks	2–1	Mori, Mrdja	3,631	
19 April 2003	Perth Oval, Perth (H)	Newcastle United	4–0	Despotovski (2), Byrnes, Mori	11,141	
25 April 2003	North Sydney Oval, Sydney (A)	Northern Spirit	3–0	Mori, Gumprecht, Despotovski	3,088	
2 May 2003	Perth Oval, Perth (H)	Parramatta Power	6–1	Mori (2), Despotovski (3), Mrdja	9,707	
9 May 2003	Hindmarsh Stadium, Adelaide (A)	Adelaide Force	2–1	Hassell, Despotovski	4,484	
17 May 2003	Perth Oval, Perth (H)	Olympic Sharks	1–0	Mori	8,904	
23 May 2003	Energy Australia Stadium, Newcastle (A)	Newcastle United	0–1		3,301	

=== Grand final ===
1 June 2003
13:00 AWST

Perth Glory	2 – 0	Olympic Sharks
Harnwell 29'; Mori 87'	Reports

Subiaco Oval, Perth
Attendance: 38,111
Referee: Mark Shield

GK	1	(Australia) Jason Petkovic
MF	2	(Australia) Matt Horsley
DF	3	(Australia) Jamie Harnwell
MF	4	(Australia) Bradley Hassell		(substituted off) 60'
MF	6	(Germany) Andre Gumprecht
MF	7	(Australia) Scott Miller
FW	10	(Australia) Bobby Despotovski (c)		(substituted off) 87'
FW	16	(Australia) Damian Mori		(substituted off) 89'
DF	18	(Australia) Shane Pryce
DF	22	(Australia) Simon Colosimo
DF	23	(Australia) David Tarka	(yellow card) 40'
Substitutes:
GK	20	(Australia) Vince Matassa
FW	9	(Australia) Nik Mrdja		(substituted on) 89'
DF	12	(Australia) Mark Byrnes		(substituted on) 60'
MF	15	(Brazil) Edgar Aldrighi Júnior		(substituted on) 87'
FW	21	(Australia) Adrian Caceres
Head coach:
(England) Mich d'Avray
Joe Marston Medal:
Simon Colosimo (Perth Glory)

GK	1	(Australia) Clint Bolton
DF	4	(Australia) Paul Kohler		(substituted off) 80'
DF	6	(Australia) Ante Juric (c)
MF	8	(Australia) Tom Pondeljak
FW	9	(Australia) Ante Milicic
MF	10	(Australia) Troy Halpin
MF	11	(Australia) Jade North
FW	17	(Australia) Jeromy Harris		(substituted off) 76'
FW	18	(Australia) Joel Porter	(yellow card) 58'	(substituted off) 80'
DF	23	(Australia) Andrew Packer
MF	27	(Japan) Hiroyuki Ishida
Substitutes:
GK	20	(Australia) Brett Hughes
MF	7	(Australia) Wayne Srhoj		(substituted on) 80'
FW	12	(Australia) Franco Parisi		(substituted on) 80'
MF	14	(Australia) Greg Owens		(substituted on) 76'
DF	24	(Australia) Andrew Durante
Head coach:
(Australia) Lee Sterrey

Assistant referees: Kevin Humphreys, John Bowdler
Fourth official: Eddie Lennie

Match rules

- 90 minutes
- 30 minutes of extra time if necessary.
- Penalty shoot-out if scores still level.

== Club ==
Coaching staff
Position	Staff
Head coach	Mich d'Avray
Assistant coach	Alan Vest

== Player details ==
List of squad players, including number of appearances by competition

No.	Pos	Nat	Player	Total		Regular season		Finals series	
No.	Pos	Nat	Player	Apps	Goals	Apps	Goals	Apps	Goals
1	GK	(Australia) AUS	Jason Petkovic	34	0	24	0	10	0
2	DF	(Australia) AUS	Matthew Horsley	29	3	19	3	10	0
3	DF/FW	(Australia) AUS	Jamie Harnwell	29	3	19	1	10	2
4	DF	(Australia) AUS	Bradley Hassell	29	8	19	6	10	2
5	DF	(Australia) AUS	Craig Deans	0	0	0	0	0	0
6	MF	(Germany) GER	André Gumprecht	34	4	24	3	10	1
7	MF	(Australia) AUS	Scott Miller	34	2	24	2	10	0
8	MF	(Australia) AUS	Anthony Danze	7	0	1	0	6	0
9	FW	(Australia) AUS	Nik Mrdja	33	8	24	6	9	2
10	FW	(Australia) AUS	Bobby Despotovski	33	19	22	7	11	12
11	FW	(Australia) AUS	Michael Garcia	9	0	9	0	0	0
12	DF	(Australia) AUS	Mark Byrnes	20	1	9	0	11	1
14	MF	(Netherlands) NED	Mohammed Mouhouti	8	0	7	0	1	0
15	MF	(Brazil) BRA	Edgar Aldrighi Júnior	27	1	24	1	3	0
16	FW	(Australia) AUS	Damian Mori	31	24	23	16	8	8
17	DF	(Australia) AUS	Gary Faria	14	0	13	0	1	0
18	DF	(Australia) AUS	Shane Pryce	34	1	23	1	11	0
20	GK	(Australia) AUS	Vince Matassa	1	0	0	0	1	0
21	FW	(Australia) AUS	Adrian Caceres	18	4	10	3	8	1
22	DF	(Australia) AUS	Simon Colosimo	14	0	4	0	10	0
23	DF	(Australia) AUS	David Tarka	28	1	20	1	8	0
24	DF	(Australia) AUS	Jamie Coyne	11	0	8	0	3	0
