= List of Perth Glory FC records and statistics =

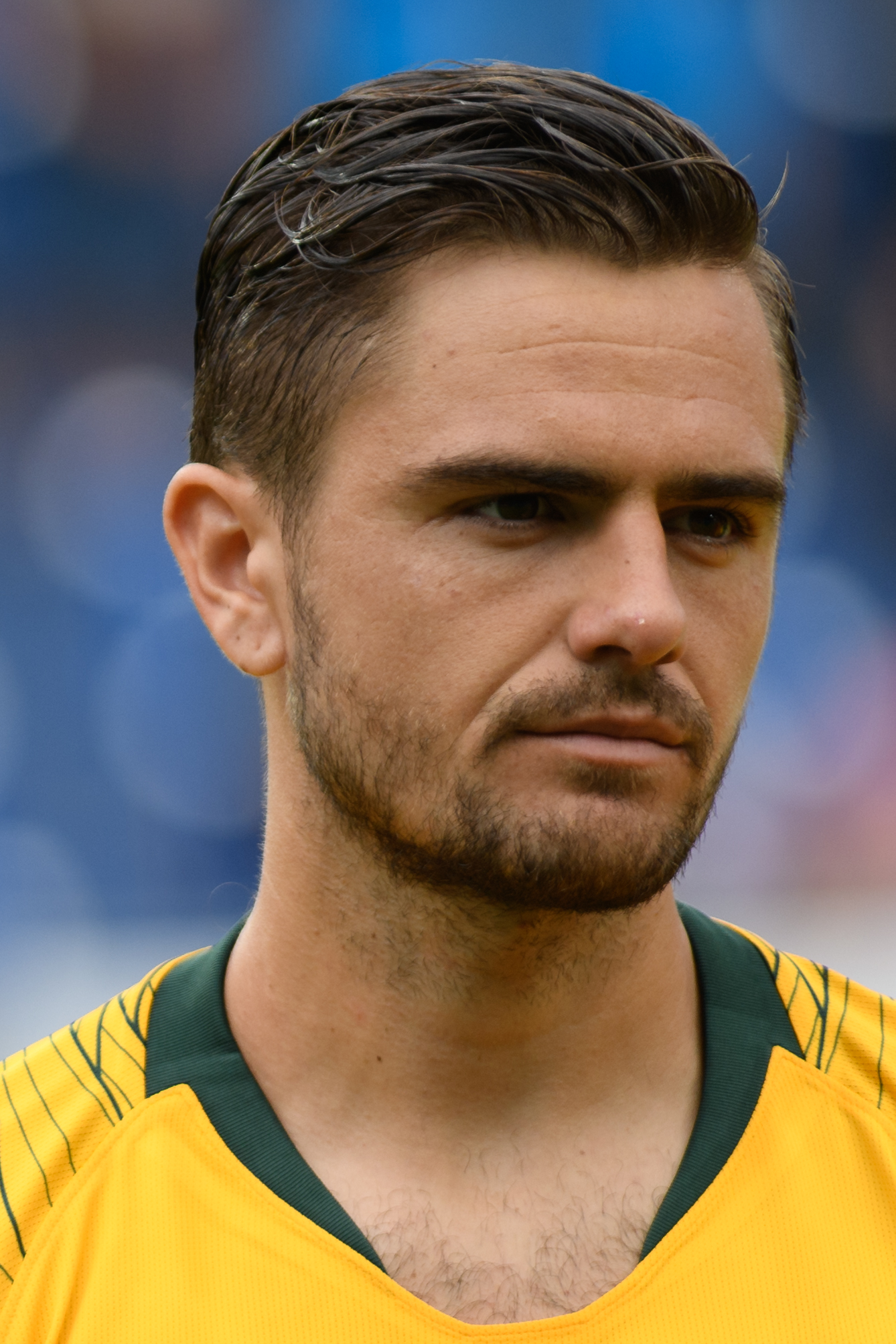
Josh Risdon had 142 A-League appearances during his Perth playing career from 2010 to 2017

Perth Glory Football Club is an Australian professional association football club based in Perth. The club was formed in 1995 and has played at its current home ground, Perth Oval, since its inception. The club played its first competitive match in the first round of the 1996–97 National Soccer League, in October 1996. Perth is one of the three National Soccer League clubs from the 2003–04 season that were implemented into the A-League Men for the inaugural 2005–06 season, and has since participated in every A-League Men season.

The list encompasses the honours won by Perth Glory, records set by the club, their managers and their players. The player records section itemises the club's leading goalscorers and those who have made most appearances in first-team competitions. It also records notable achievements by Perth Glory players on the international stage, and the highest transfer fees paid and received by the club. Attendance records at Lord Street, the Perth Oval, the club's home ground since 1996, and other temporary home grounds, such as Arena Joondalup in 2003, are also included.

Perth Glory have won six top-flight titles. The club's record appearance maker is Jamie Harnwell, who made 269 appearances between 1998 and 2011. Bobby Despotovski is Perth Glory's record goalscorer, scoring 116 goals in total.

All figures are correct as of 2 May 2024.

== Honours and achievements ==

Starting lineup for the match Perth won 1–0 to secure the 2018–19 premiership

=== Domestic ===
- National Soccer League (until 2004) and A-League Men Premiership

Winners (4): 1999–2000, 2001–02, 2003–04, 2018–19
Runners-up (1): 2002–03

- National Soccer League (until 2004) and A-League Men Championship

Winners (2): 2002–03, 2003–04
Runners-up (4): 1999–2000, 2001–02, 2011–12, 2018–19

- Australia Cup

Runners-up (2): 2014, 2015

- A-League Pre-Season Challenge Cup

Runners-up (2): 2005, 2007

== Player records ==
=== Appearances ===
- Most league appearances: Jamie Harnwell, 256
- Youngest first-team player: Daniel De Silva, 15 years, 361 days (against Sydney FC, A-League Men, 2 March 2013)
- Oldest first-team player: Ante Covic, 40 years, 309 days (against Melbourne City, A-League Men Finals, 17 April 2016)
- Most consecutive appearances: Danny Vukovic, 80 (from 9 October 2011 to 22 February 2014)

==== Most appearances ====
Competitive matches only, includes appearances as substitute. Numbers in brackets indicate goals scored.

#	Name	Years	League^{a}	National Cup^{b}	Asia	Other^{c}	Total
1	(Australia) Jamie Harnwell	1998–2011	256 (44)	12 (2)	0 (0)	1 (0)	269 (46)
2	(Australia) Bobby Despotovski	1996–2004; 2005–2007	241 (113)	8 (3)	0 (0)	1 (0)	250 (116)
3	(Australia) Scott Miller	1996–2006	227 (17)	5 (0)	0 (0)	1 (0)	233 (17)
4	(Australia) Jason Petkovic	1999–2004; 2005–2009	177 (0)	6 (0)	0 (0)	0 (0)	184 (0)
5	(Australia) Jamie Coyne	2002–2004; 2005–2011	152 (2)	13 (0)	0 (0)	1 (0)	166 (2)
6	(Republic of Ireland) Andy Keogh	2014–2015; 2016–2019; 2020–2022	156 (59)	8 (5)	0 (0)	0 (0)	164 (64)
7	(Australia) Liam Reddy	2016–2023	155 (0)	5 (0)	3 (0)	0 (0)	163 (0)
8	(Australia) Chris Harold	2012–2020	143 (21)	10 (3)	0 (0)	0 (0)	153 (24)
8	(Australia) Josh Risdon	2010–2017	142 (2)	11 (0)	0 (0)	0 (0)	153 (2)
10	(Spain) Diego Castro	2015–2021	136 (49)	5 (0)	5 (0)	0 (0)	146 (49)

a. Includes the National Soccer League and A-League Men.
b. Includes the A-League Pre-Season Challenge Cup and Australia Cup
c. Includes goals and appearances (including those as a substitute) in the 2005 Australian Club World Championship Qualifying Tournament.

=== Goalscorers ===
- Most goals in a season: Damian Mori, 24 (in the 2002–03 season)
- Most league goals in a season: Damian Mori, 24 (in the 2002–03 season)
- Youngest goalscorer: Daniel De Silva, 17 years, 237 days (against Melbourne Victory, Australia Cup, 29 October 2014)
- Oldest goalscorer: Diego Castro, 38 years, 325 days (against Macarthur FC, A-League Men, 23 May 2021)

==== Top goalscorers ====
Competitive matches only. Numbers in brackets indicate appearances made.

#	Name	Years	League^{a}	National Cup^{b}	Asia	Other^{c}	Total
1	(Australia) Bobby Despotovski	1996–2004; 2005–2007	113 (241)	3 (8)	0 (0)	0 (1)	116 (250)
2	(Australia) Damian Mori	2000–2006	84 (129)	0 (0)	0 (0)	0 (0)	84 (129)
3	(Republic of Ireland) Andy Keogh	2014–2015; 2016–2019; 2020–2022	59 (156)	5 (8)	0 (0)	0 (0)	64 (164)
4	(Australia) Adam Taggart	2011–2012; 2016–2018; 2023–	60 (130)	0 (3)	0 (0)	0 (0)	60 (133)
5	(Spain) Diego Castro	2015–2021	49 (134)	0 (5)	0 (5)	0 (0)	49 (144)
6	(Australia) Jamie Harnwell	1998–2011	44 (256)	2 (12)	0 (0)	0 (1)	46 (269)
7	(Australia) Bruno Fornaroli	2019–2022	34 (72)	0 (1)	1 (6)	0 (0)	35 (79)
8	(New Zealand) Shane Smeltz	2011–2014	28 (58)	0 (0)	0 (0)	0 (0)	28 (58)
9	(Australia) Con Boutsianis	1998–2000	25 (49)	0 (0)	0 (0)	0 (0)	25 (49)
9	(Australia) Nik Mrdja	2000–2004	25 (73)	0 (0)	0 (0)	0 (0)	25 (73)

a. Includes the National Soccer League and A-League Men.
b. Includes the A-League Pre-Season Challenge Cup and Australia Cup
c. Includes goals and appearances (including those as a substitute) in the 2005 Australian Club World Championship Qualifying Tournament.

=== Award winners ===
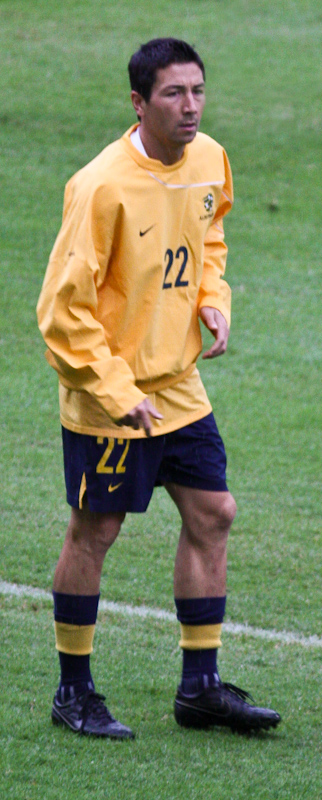
Jacob Burns was the first Perth player to win the Joe Marston Medal in the A-League era

Johnny Warren Medal

The following players have won the Johnny Warren Medal while playing for Perth Glory:

- (Australia) Damian Mori – 2002–03
- (Australia) Bobby Despotovski – 2005–06
- (Spain) Diego Castro – 2015–16

Joe Marston Medal

The following players have won the Joe Marston Medal while playing for Perth Glory:

- (Australia) Simon Colosimo – 2003
- (Australia) Jacob Burns – 2012

Harry Kewell Medal

The following players have won the Harry Kewell Medal while playing for Perth Glory:

- (Australia) Nikita Rukavytsya – 2008–09
- (Australia) Chris Ikonomidis – 2018–19

Young Footballer of the Year

The following players have won the A-League Men Young Footballer of the Year award while playing for Perth Glory:

- (Australia) Nick Ward – 2005–06
- (Australia) Chris Ikonomidis – 2018–19

Golden Boot

The following players have won the Golden Boot while playing for Perth Glory:

- (Australia) Damian Mori – 2001–02 & 2002–03
- (Australia) Bobby Despotovski – 2005–06
- (Australia) Adam Taggart – 2023–24

Goal of the Year

The following players have won the A-League Men Goal of the Year award while playing for Perth Glory:

- (Republic of Ireland) Andy Keogh – 2020–21
- (Australia) Giordano Colli – 2022–23

=== International ===
This section refers only to caps won while a Perth Glory player.

- First capped player: Gavin Wilkinson, for New Zealand against Oman on 29 September 1996
- First capped player for Australia: Ernie Tapai, against Iran on 22 November 1997
- First player to play in the Asian Cup finals: Chris Ikonomidis, for Australia against Jordan on 6 January 2019

=== Transfers ===
==== Record transfer fees received ====
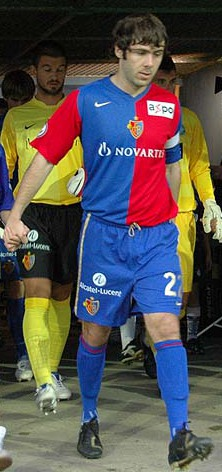
Ivan Ergić, the club's current record seller

#	Fee	Received from	For	Date	Notes	Ref
1	$1.6m	(Italy) Juventus	(Serbia) Ivan Ergić	2000		
2	$1.2m	(Italy) Roma	(Australia) Daniel De Silva	2013		
3	$850k	(Germany) Borussia Mönchengladbach	(Australia) Jacob Italiano	2019		

== Managerial records ==
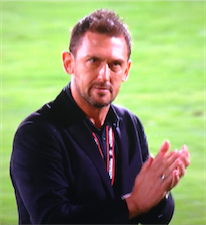
Tony Popovic won Perth its first piece of A-League Men silverware, the 2018–19 premiership, as manager from 2018 to 2020

- First full-time manager: Gary Marocchi
- Longest-serving manager: Kenny Lowe – Dec 2013 - Apr 2018 (141 matches)^{[A]}
- Shortest-serving manager: Kenny Lowe – July 2023 - August 2023 (1 match)^{[B]}
- Highest win percentage: 68.54% – Mich d'Avray
- Lowest win percentage: 0% – Kenny Lowe^{[B]}

=== Award winners ===
Coach of the Year

The following managers have won the Coach of the Year award while managing Perth Glory, either in the National Soccer League or the A-League Men:

- (Germany) Bernd Stange – 1999–2000
- (England) Mich d'Avray – 2003–04
- (Australia) Tony Popovic – 2018–19

== Team records ==
=== Matches ===
==== Firsts ====
- First match: Perth Glory 0–3 Sampdoria, friendly, 31 May 1996
- First National Soccer League match: Perth Glory 1–4 UTS Olympic, 13 October 1996
- First A-League Men match: Perth Glory 0–1 Central Coast Mariners, 26 August 2005
- First Australia Cup match: Newcastle Jets 0–2 Perth Glory, 5 August 2014
- First Asian match: FC Tokyo 1–0 Perth Glory, AFC Champions League group stage, 18 February 2020

==== Record wins ====
- Record league win: 6–0 against Canberra Cosmos, National Soccer League, 3 November 1996
- Record Australia Cup win:
  - 4–1 against St Albans Saints, 23 September 2014
  - 3–0 against Bentleigh Greens, 11 November 2014

==== Record defeats ====
- Record league defeat: 0–8 against Melbourne City, A-League Men, 14 April 2024
- Record Australia Cup defeat: 0–4 against Macarthur FC, 18 July 2023
- Record Asian defeat: 0–2 against Ulsan Hyundai, AFC Champions League group stage, 27 November 2020

==== Record consecutive results ====
- Record consecutive wins: 8, from 7 October 2001 to 1 December 2001
- Record consecutive defeats: 7, from 12 September 2010 to 30 October 2010
- Record consecutive matches without a defeat: 14, from 10 December 2003 to 22 February 2004
- Record consecutive matches without a win: 18, from 24 February 2024 to 14 December 2024.

=== Goals ===
- Most league goals scored in a season: 73 in 28 matches – 2000–01
- Fewest league goals scored in a season: 20 in 26 matches – 2021–22
- Most league goals conceded in a season: 69 in 27 matches – 2023–24
- Fewest league goals conceded in a season: 22 in 24 matches – 2002–03, 2003–04

=== Points ===
- Most points in a season:
  - 64 in 34 matches, National Soccer League, 1999–2000
  - 61 in 30 matches, National Soccer League, 2000–01
  - 60 in 27 matches, A-League Men, 2018–19
- Fewest points in a season: 17 in 26 matches, A-League Men, 2024–25

=== Attendances ===
- Highest home attendance: 56,371 against Sydney FC at Perth Stadium, 2019 A-League Grand Final, 19 May 2019
- Highest home attendance at Perth Oval: 18,067 against South Melbourne, National Soccer League, 15 November 1998
- Lowest home attendance at Perth Oval: 2,577 against Newcastle Jets, A-League Men, 30 March 2022

== Footnotes ==
A. Kenny Lowe's first tenure as manager.
B. Kenny Lowe's second tenure as manager.
