= Macedonia Park, Perth =

Sports venue in Perth, Western Australia

Macedonia Park
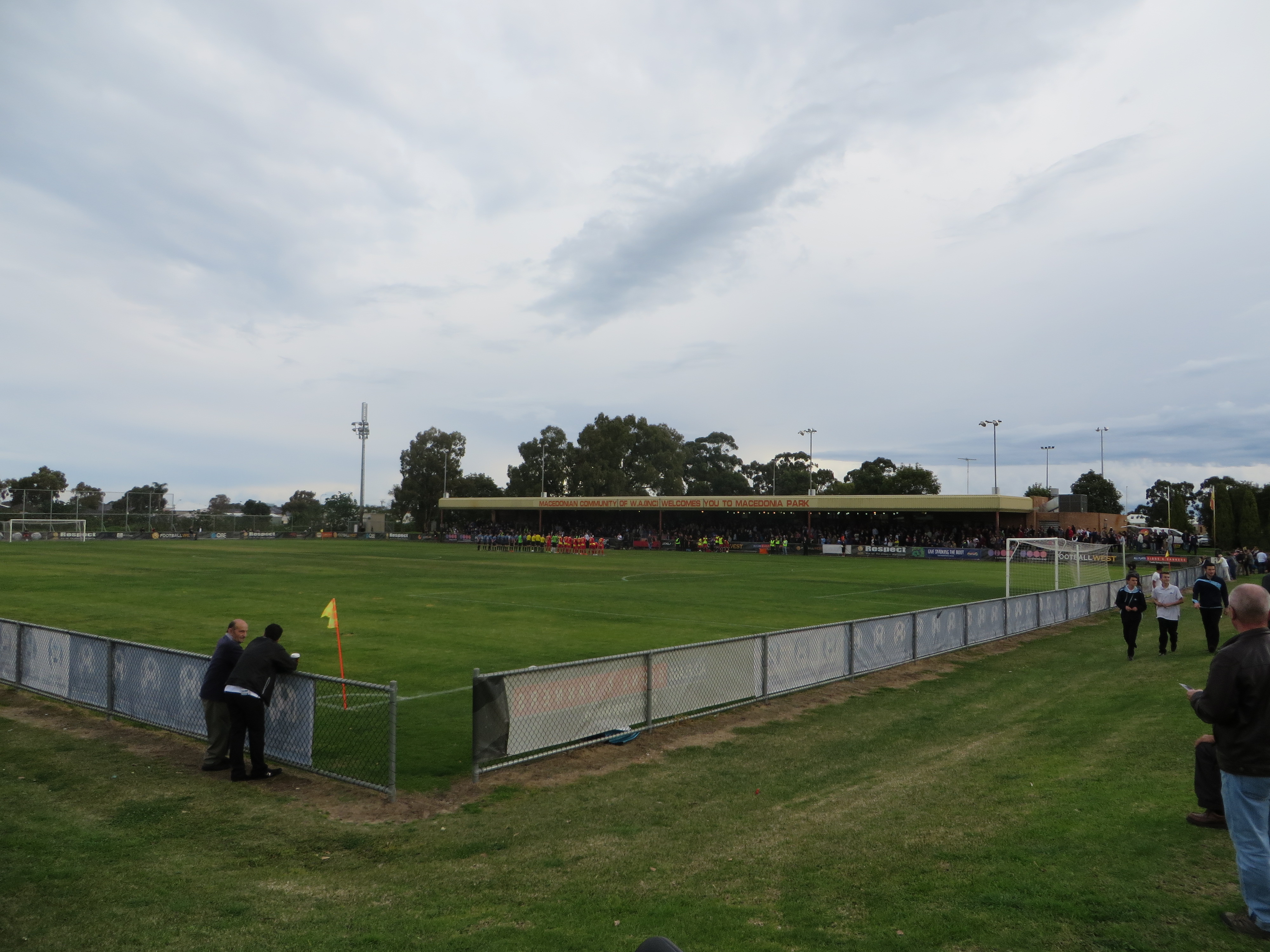
- Interactive map of Macedonia Park
- Location: 273 Albert Street, Balcatta
- Coordinates: 31.888388°S 115.822038°E
- Owner: Stirling Macedonia Football Club
- Capacity: 5,000 (4,500 for A-League matches)
- Surface: Grass

Construction
- Groundbreaking: 1984
- Opened: 1985
- Renovated: 1986

Tenants
- Stirling Macedonia FC (1986–); Perth Kangaroos IFC (1994); Perth Glory FC (A-League Men) (2022–2023); Perth Glory FC (A-League Women) (2021–2024)

Macedonia Park is a multi-use stadium in Perth, Western Australia. It is mainly used for soccer and is the home ground for Stirling Macedonia. The stadium has a capacity of 5,000 people, however capacity will be capped at 4,500 for the 2022–23 A-League season.

The ground was developed by the Macedonian Community of Western Australia in the mid-1980s after receiving federal government grants from the Hawke government. The stadium was built in conjunction with adjoining community facilities.

Macedonia Park was officially opened in 1986, with Stirling Macedonia hosting Adelaide City in the first round of the 1986 NSL Cup in front of a crowd of 5,000.

In 1994, Perth Kangaroos IFC played matches during the first half of the 1994 FAS Premier League season at Macedonia Park, before financial difficulties and poor crowds forced the club to move to Dorrien Gardens.

In 2012, the stadium received an upgrade worth $1.1 million was funded by the Gillard government, including an upgrade of the pitch and lighting. When Stirling Lions were drawn against Melbourne Victory in the 2014 FFA Cup, the lighting was deemed to be inadequate and the match was moved to the WA Athletics Stadium with Perth Oval unavailable due to pitch repairs.

Macedonia Park was host to Perth Glory's only home game during the 2021–22 A-League Women season.

In September 2022, the ground was announced as the home venue for the Perth Glory men's team for 10 of the 13 home games of the 2022–23 A-League Men season, due to ongoing redevelopment work of Perth Oval, their usual home ground. Additionally, the ground will be the women's team home ground for the full A-League Women season.
