= Tyler Simpson =

Australian soccer player (1985–2011)

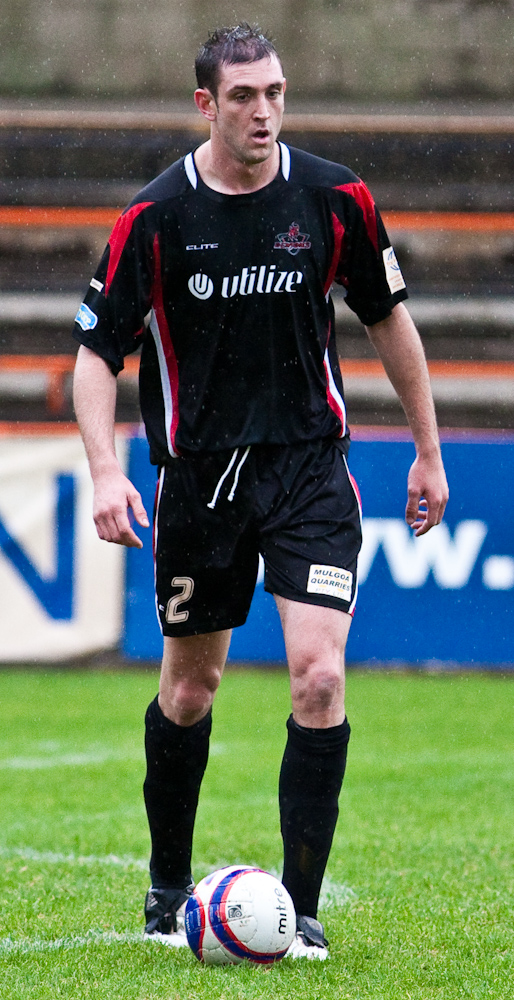

Personal information
- Full name: Tyler John Simpson
- Date of birth: 28 August 1985
- Place of birth: Sydney, Australia
- Date of death: 26 May 2011 (aged 25)
- Place of death: Sydney, Australia
- Height: 1.98 m (6 ft 6 in)
- Position: Right back

Youth career
- Gladesville-Hornsby
- Dinamo-Zenit Yerevan
- APIA Leichhardt
- Blacktown City Demons
- Northern Spirit

Senior career*
Years	Team	Apps	(Gls)
2004	Northern Tigers	3	(1)
2004–2005	St George Saints		
2005–2006	Queensland Roar	4	(0)
2006–2007	Perth Glory	1	(0)
2007	Sydney Olympic		
2007–2008	Perth Glory	14	(0)
2008–2011	Blacktown City		
- * Club domestic league appearances and goals as of 21 January 2008

Tyler John Simpson (28 August 1985 – 26 May 2011) was an Australian football (soccer) player who played as a central defender or right back. He was the twin of fellow footballer Jordan Simpson.

== Career ==
Simpson played in the NSW Premier League with Blacktown City Demons, APIA Leichhardt and Sydney Olympic. He had short stints in the A-League with Perth Glory and then-Queensland Roar. Simpson also played for a short time in Armenia with Dinamo-Zenit Yerevan.

It was a shock to many fans and supporters of football in Australia when his death, which was later disclosed to be suicide, was announced on 26 May 2011. A minute's silence was held as a mark of respect and remembrance to Simpson before the Round 10 clashes between Blacktown City Demons and South Coast Wolves and Sydney Olympic and Rockdale City Suns. As a mark of respect the Olyroos (Australian under 23s) wore black armbands in their friendly against Japan on 1 June 2011 in Niigata.

== See also ==
- List of Perth Glory FC players (1–24 appearances)
