= Mehmedalija Čović =

Bosnian footballer (born 1986)

Personal information
- Date of birth: 16 March 1986 (age 40)
- Place of birth: Srebrenik, SFR Yugoslavia
- Height: 1.91 m (6 ft 3 in)
- Position: Centre-back

Senior career*
Years	Team	Apps	(Gls)
2004–2007	Sloboda Tuzla	49	(3)
2005–2006	→Budućnost (loan)	11	(0)
2007–2009	Gent	2	(0)
2008	→ Roeselare (loan)	8	(0)
2008–2009	→ Interblock (loan)	13	(1)
2012–2013	Čelik Zenica	19	(1)
2013–2014	Zhetysu Taldykorgan	0	(0)
2014	Čelik Zenica	7	(1)
2014–2015	Zvijezda	22	(0)
2015–2016	Mladost Doboj Kakanj	19	(1)
2016–2017	TSG Neustrelitz	19	(0)
2017–2020	TuS Erndtebrück	53	(5)

International career
2007–2008	Bosnia-Herzegovina U21	1	(0)
2008	Bosnia and Herzegovina	1	(0)
- * Club domestic league appearances and goals

Mehmedalija Čović (born 16 March 1986) is a Bosnian former professional footballer who played as a centre-back.

== Club career ==
This tall defender also played for FK Sloboda Tuzla in the Premier League of Bosnia and Herzegovina. His career began in the same club, but he also played for Zrinjski Mostar.
