= Admir Terzić =

German footballer

Personal information
- Date of birth: 19 September 1992 (age 34)
- Place of birth: Alsdorf, Germany
- Height: 1.84 m (6 ft 0 in)
- Position: Centre-back

Team information
- Current team: TuS Erndtebrück
- Number: 28

Youth career
- SC Kellersberg
- –2009: Alemannia Aachen
- 2009–2011: Borussia Dortmund

Senior career*
Years	Team	Apps	(Gls)
2011–2013	Borussia Dortmund II	24	(0)
2014	SV Lippstadt	1	(0)
2014–2015	FC Roetgen	18	(2)
2015–2016	Sportfreunde Düren	17	(1)
2016–2017	Borussia Freialdenhoven	19	(0)
2017	TuRU Düsseldorf	7	(1)
2018–2019	TuS Erndtebrück	32	(1)
2019	Wegberg-Beeck	3	(0)
2020	Viktoria Arnoldsweiler	2	(0)
2020–	TuS Erndtebrück	59	(2)
- * Club domestic league appearances and goals as of 19:01, 20 November 2023 (UTC)

Admir Terzić (born 19 September 1992) is a German footballer who plays as a centre-back for TuS Erndtebrück.
