= TuS Erndtebrück =

Association football club in Germany

- Full name: Turn- und Sportverein Erndtebrück 1895 e.V.
- Founded: 1895; 130 years ago
- League: Oberliga Westfalen (V)
- 2017–18: Regionalliga West (IV), 17th (relegated)
- Website: http://www.xn--tus-erndtebrck-rsb.de/
Home colours	Away colours

TuS Erndtebrück is a German association football club from the town of Erndtebrück, Siegen-Wittgenstein. The club was established in 1895 as the gymnastics club Turnverein Erndtebrück. Today, TuS has a dozen other sports departments in addition to its football side.

== History ==
TuS was originally established with departments for gymnastics and athletics and grew in 1897 to include a newly formed marching band. After merging with VfB Erndtebrück in 1921, the club was renamed Turn- und Sportverein Erndtebrück and formed a football department at that time. In 1953, swimming and winter sports departments were formed, with the skiers becoming quite successful. Other sports were added over the years, including bowling (1963), martial arts (1988), Taekwondo (1992), and jiu-jitsu (2003).

The footballers first came to note with their promotion to the Verbandsliga Westfalen (VI) in 2000. They narrowly missed advancing to the Landesliga when they lost a playoff match to SV Hohenlimburg in a shootout. They finished third in 2007–08 and as runners-up behind SpVgg Erkenschwick in 2009–10 before finally capturing the league title in 2011 to advance to the NRW-Liga (V). That same season, the second team side captured the Bezirksliga title to advance to Landesliga play, and beat Sportfreunde Siegen to win the Kreispokal. Since 2012 the club played in the tier five Oberliga Westfalen, where it won a league championship in 2015 and earned promotion to the Regionalliga West for a season before being relegated again.

== Current squad ==
As of 16 February 2018

Note: Flags indicate national team as defined under FIFA eligibility rules; some limited exceptions apply. Players may hold more than one non-FIFA nationality.

No.	Pos.	Nation	Player
2	MF	(Guinea) GUI	Mory Konaté
3	DF	(Bosnia and Herzegovina) BIH	Mehmedalija Čović
4	MF	(Germany) GER	Marco Rente
5	DF	(Argentina) ARG	Pablo Schmitt
6	MF	(Germany) GER	Tim Treude (Captain)
7	FW	(Germany) GER	Hedon Selishta
8	MF	(Germany) GER	Niklas Zeller
9	MF	(Albania) ALB	Xhuljo Tabaku
10	FW	(Germany) GER	Philipp Böhmer
14	FW	(Japan) JPN	Yuki Nishiya
16	FW	(Germany) GER	Lukas Röche
17	DF	(Germany) GER	Gunnar Niemann
18	DF	(Germany) GER	Johammes Ludmann
19	DF	(Hungary) HUN	Dániel Sváb

No.	Pos.	Nation	Player
22	FW	(Australia) AUS	Stefan Valentini
23	DF	(Germany) GER	Dominik Jordan
24	DF	(Germany) GER	Cedric Heller
25	GK	(Germany) GER	Niklas Jakusch
26	MF	(Germany) GER	Ilyass Mirroche
27	DF	(Democratic Republic of the Congo) COD	Nino Saka
28	DF	(Germany) GER	Admir Terzić
30	DF	(Germany) GER	Benjamin Kraft
31	FW	(Germany) GER	Jan-Patrick Kadiata
34	GK	(Germany) GER	Timo Bäcker
51	GK	(Germany) GER	Paul Schünemann
—	MF	(Japan) JPN	Shogo Iwamoto
—	MF	(Finland) FIN	Armend Kabashi

== Honours ==
- Westfalenliga – Group 2
  - Champions: 2011
- Oberliga Westfalen
  - Champions: 2014–15, 2016–17
