= Tim Treude =

German footballer

Personal information
- Full name: Tim Treude
- Date of birth: 28 January 1990 (age 36)
- Place of birth: Germany
- Height: 1.78 m (5 ft 10 in)
- Position: Midfielder

Team information
- Current team: TuS Erndtebrück
- Number: 6

Youth career
- Sportfreunde Birkelbach
- –2003: TSV Aue-Wingeshausen
- 2003–2009: Borussia Dortmund

Senior career*
| Years | Team | Apps | (Gls) |
| 2009–2014 | Borussia Dortmund II | 96 | (6) |
| 2014–2015 | Rot-Weiss Essen | 23 | (0) |
| 2015– | TuS Erndtebrück | 34 | (1) |
- * Club domestic league appearances and goals as of 19 February 2018

Tim Treude (born 28 January 1990) is a German footballer. He currently plays for TuS Erndtebrück.
