= Jordan Simpson (Australian soccer) =

Australian soccer player (born 1985)

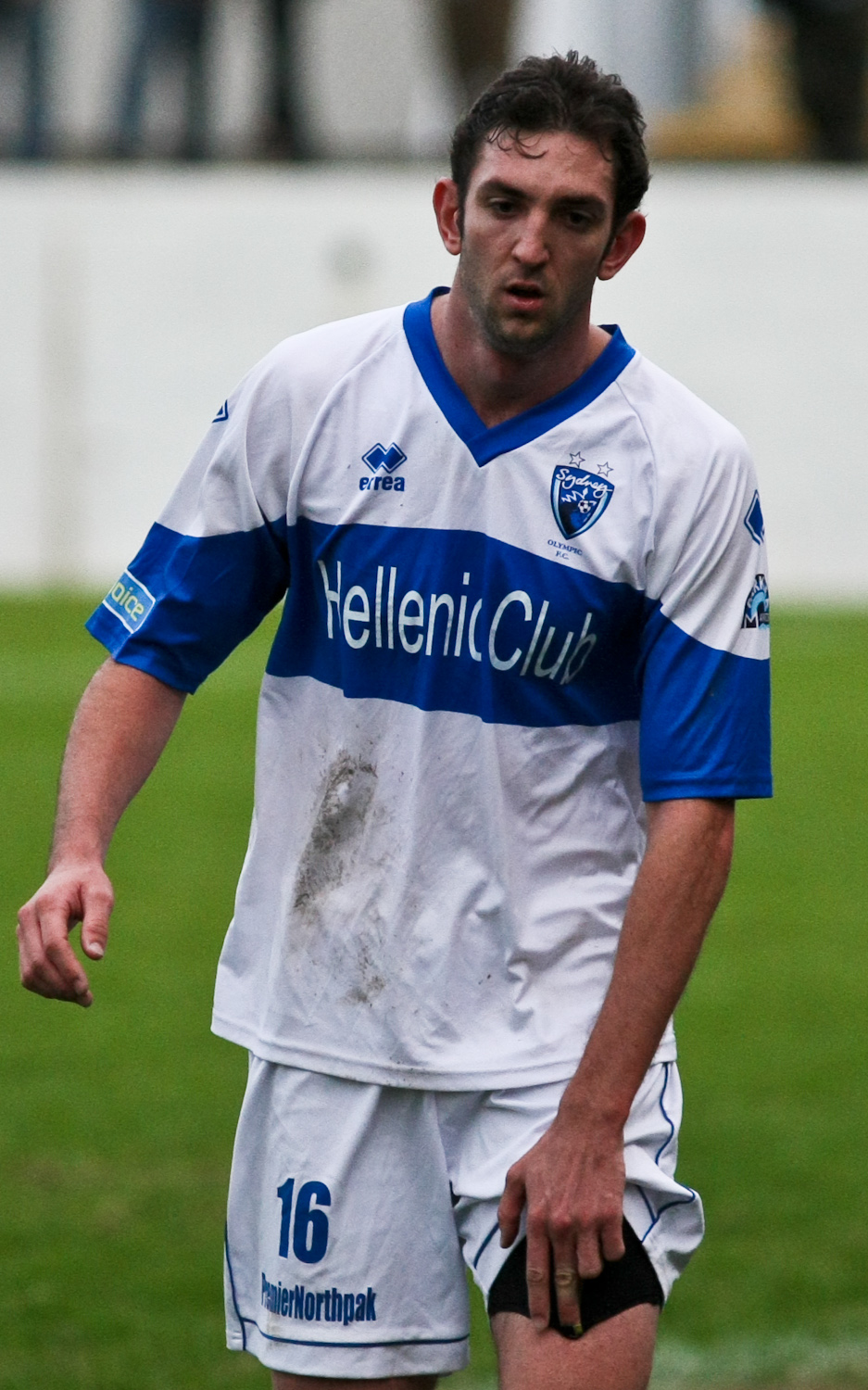

Personal information
- Full name: Jordan Simpson
- Date of birth: 28 August 1985 (age 41)
- Place of birth: Sydney, Australia
- Height: 1.94 m (6 ft 4 1/2 in)
- Positions: Central midfielder; attacking midfielder

Youth career
- Gladesville-Hornsby
- APIA Leichhardt
- 2002–2003: Blacktown City Demons
- 2003–2004: Parramatta Power

Senior career*
Years	Team	Apps	(Gls)
2005–2006	Queensland Roar	6	(0)
2006–2007	BSC Young Boys	8	(0)
2007–2008	Perth Glory	6	(1)
2008	Blacktown City Demons	16	(0)
2008	FF Jaro	10	(3)
2009	Sydney Olympic FC	12	(1)
2010	Blacktown City FC	16	(2)
2011	Sutherland Sharks	0	(0)
2012	Bonnyrigg White Eagles	15	(1)
2013	Blacktown Spartans	1	(0)
2013	Bankstown City	16	(2)
2014	APIA Leichhardt	11	(0)
2016–2017	Fraser Park	36	(7)

International career^{‡}
2007	Australia U-23	5	(0)
- * Club domestic league appearances and goals as of 29 September 2017 ‡ National team caps and goals as of 11 July 2016

Jordan Simpson (born 28 August 1985) is an Australian footballer who plays as a central midfielder for National Premier Leagues NSW 2 club Fraser Park FC.

== Club career ==
Simpson played for the Queensland Roar in the inaugural year of the A-League competition but was released in January 2006. In 2006-07 he played for BSC Young Boys of Bern, Switzerland and in 2007 for Perth Glory. Simpson who was signed in August by FF Jaro from Blacktown City Demons, left on 20 February 2009 Finland and turned back to Australia, who has signed with Sydney Olympic FC. He turned in January 2010 from Sydney Olympic back to Blacktown City Demons and now in 2011 he signed with Super League team Northern Spirit FC.

== Personal life ==
Jordan is the twin brother of the late Tyler Simpson.
