= Jacob Collard =

Australian professional footballer

Personal information
- Full name: Jacob Collard
- Date of birth: 12 April 1995 (age 31)
- Place of birth: Australia
- Height: 1.75 m (5 ft 9 in)
- Position: Right back

Youth career
- 2012–2015: Perth Glory

Senior career*
Years	Team	Apps	(Gls)
2012	FW NTC	1	(0)
2014–2015	Perth Glory NPL	33	(1)
2015–2016	Perth Glory	2	(0)
2016	Olympia	9	(0)
2016	Oakleigh Cannons	8	(0)
2016	Bayswater City	0	(0)
2017–2019	Gosnells City		
- * Club domestic league appearances and goals as of 30 September 2016

Jacob Collard (born 12 April 1995) is an Australian professional footballer who plays as right back for Oakleigh Cannons FC.

== Early life ==
Collard is an Indigenous Australian.

He was raised in Perth, attending South Thornlie Primary School and Lynwood Senior High School.

== Club career ==
Collard made his competitive debut for Perth as a substitute in a win over Newcastle Jets in the 2015 FFA Cup. He made his A-League debut for the club against Adelaide United on 9 January 2020. In his second A-League appearance, one week later, Collard was sent off in the 63rd minute.

After failing to secure a professional contract with Perth, Collard joined Tasmanian side Olympia on 5 March 2016. Collard left the club in April 2016, to move to Melbourne.

Collard joined National Premier Leagues Victoria side Oakleigh Cannons in May 2016.

== Outside football ==
Before playing for Perth Glory, Collard worked as a plumber.

In 2017, Collard undertook a Western Australia Police cadetship for Indigenous Australians.

== See also ==
- List of Indigenous Australian sportspeople
- List of Perth Glory FC players (1–24 appearances)
