= 1994 FAS Premier League =

The 1994 FAS Premier League season was the seventh season of the FAS Premier League, then the top tier of football in Singapore. The league was won by Australian club Perth Kangaroos in their only season.

== League table ==
Pos	Team	Pld	W	D	L	GF	GA	GD	Pts
1	(Australia) Perth Kangaroos (C)	18	17	1	0	75	8	+67	35
2	(Australia) Darwin Cubs	18	13	2	3	56	14	+42	28
3	Geylang International	18	11	2	5	32	28	+4	24
4	Tiong Bahru	18	8	5	5	35	32	+3	21
5	Gibraltar Crescent	18	9	3	6	29	22	+7	21
6	SAFSA	18	7	2	9	20	32	−12	16
7	Police SA	18	5	3	10	25	34	−9	13
8	Tyrhwhitt Soccerites	18	3	3	12	24	45	−21	9
9	Balestier United	18	3	2	13	17	46	−29	8
10	Jurong Town	18	2	1	15	23	69	−46	5

Updated to match(es) played on unknown. Source: RSSSF
Rules for classification: 1) points; 2) goal difference; 3) number of goals scored; 4) number of wins
(C) Champions

== Teams ==
Team	Location	Stadium
Balestier United		
Darwin Cubs	Darwin, Australia	Marrara Oval
Geylang International		
Gilbraltar Crescent		Yishun Stadium
Jurong Town	Jurong	Jurong Stadium
Perth Kangaroos	Perth, Australia	Dorrien Gardens; Macedonia Park
Police SA		
SAFSA		
Tiong Bahru		
Tyrhwhitt Soccerites		Jalan Besar Stadium
