= Perth Kangaroos IFC =

Defunct soccer club in Perth, Western Australia

Perth Kangaroos
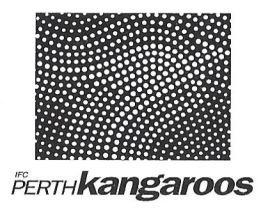
- Full name: Perth Kangaroos International Football Club
- Nickname: The Kangaroos
- Founded: 1994
- Dissolved: 1995
- Ground: Macedonia Park; Dorrien Gardens
- Capacity: 1,000
- Chairman: Joe Claudio
- Manager: (Australia) Gary Marocchi
- League: FAS Premier League
- 1994: 1st

Perth Kangaroos International Football Club was a soccer club based in Perth, Western Australia. Perth Kangaroos played as an overseas team in the 1994 season of the FAS Premier League in Singapore and won the league title. The team was a forerunner of the Australian A-League soccer club Perth Glory.

== History ==
Perth Kangaroos was put together in 1994 by Global Football Australia, a consortium led by businessman Joe Claudio. Western Australia had been keen to be represented in Australia's National Soccer League (NSL) since it was formed in 1977, but a series of logistical problems and financial concerns meant that the league were not keen to include a Western Australian club. It was hoped that entering a team in the Singapore league would either help pave the way for entry into the NSL or, alternatively, help the Perth club establish a place in a mooted Asia-Pacific Super League which could become a sporting and financial empire. The Kangaroos were one of two Australian teams to compete in the FAS Premier League in 1994 – the other being the Darwin Cubs.

The team was captained initially by Craig Naven, and later by his brother Gareth Naven, under manager Gary Marocchi and assistant manager Mickey Brennan.

On the field, the Perth Kangaroos were a tremendous success. They finished the 1994 league season undefeated and comfortably won the Singapore league title. However off the field the venture was a financial disaster. Attendances at the matches were far lower than expected, and part way through the season Global Football Australia had to declare itself bankrupt and hand over control of the team to the Soccer Association of Western Australia.

The Kangaroos were disbanded after the 1994 season. However their success in the Singapore league gained the NSL's attention. In 1995, another Perth-based consortium led by Nick Tana successfully bid for entry into the NSL. Perth Glory were created and joined the NSL in 1996. In 2005, Perth Glory were selected to enter the re-vamped Australian national league, the A-League.

== Honours ==
=== Domestic ===
- FAS Premier League:

Champions (1): 1994

== See also ==
- Perth Glory FC
- FAS Premier League
- 1994 FAS Premier League
