= Stefan Valentini =

Australian soccer player

Personal information
- Full name: Stefan Valentini
- Date of birth: 15 July 1996 (age 30)
- Place of birth: Perth, Western Australia
- Height: 1.81 m (5 ft 11 in)
- Positions: Striker; centre attacking midfielder; winger

Team information
- Current team: Oakleigh Cannons FC

Youth career
- Stirling Panthers
- 2014: Balcatta FC
- 2015: South Melbourne
- 2015: Perth Glory

Senior career*
Years	Team	Apps	(Gls)
2014	Balcatta FC	1	(0)
2015	Perth Glory NPL	12	(5)
2015	Perth Glory	0	(0)
2016–2017	Eintracht Braunschweig II	34	(6)
2017–2018	TuS Erndtebruck	25	(5)
2017–2018	TuS Erndtebruck II	2	(3)
2019–2020	Avondale FC	31	(10)
2020	Adelaide Blue Eagles	10	(5)
2021-2022	Avondale FC	34	(20)
2023-	Oakleigh Cannons	48	(17)
- * Club domestic league appearances and goals as of 29 January 2025

Stefan Valentini (born 15 July 1996) is an Australian footballer who plays as a striker for Oakleigh Cannons FC. Previously he played for Eintracht Braunschweig II, in the Regionalliga Nord, Germany. Born in Perth, Valentini holds a dual citizenship due to his Italian heritage.

== Youth career ==
Valentini was named National Premier Leagues Western Australia Under 20 Player of the Year (2014) after playing only 12 games of the season and netting 12 goals for Balcatta FC.

== Senior career ==
On 11 August 2015, he made his professional senior debut for Perth Glory in the 2015 FFA Cup against Newcastle Jets, coming off the bench and winning a penalty to give Glory a 2–1 lead to then scoring a penalty in the penalty shoot-out to advance to the next round of the FFA Cup. Valentini was an unused substitute in the 0–2 loss to Melbourne Victory in the 2015 FFA Cup Final.

Valentini won the Dylan Tombides Young Player of the Year award at the conclusion of the 2015 NPL season, after playing only 14 matches.

In January 2016, he joined the reserve side of Eintracht Braunschweig in the Regionalliga Nord. On 19 July 2017, he joined TuS Erndtebruck in the Regionalliga West on a free transfer.

In January 2019, Valentini joined National Premier Leagues Victoria side Avondale FC, scoring on his second start for the club.
