= Doug Ithier =

Australian soccer player (born 1974)

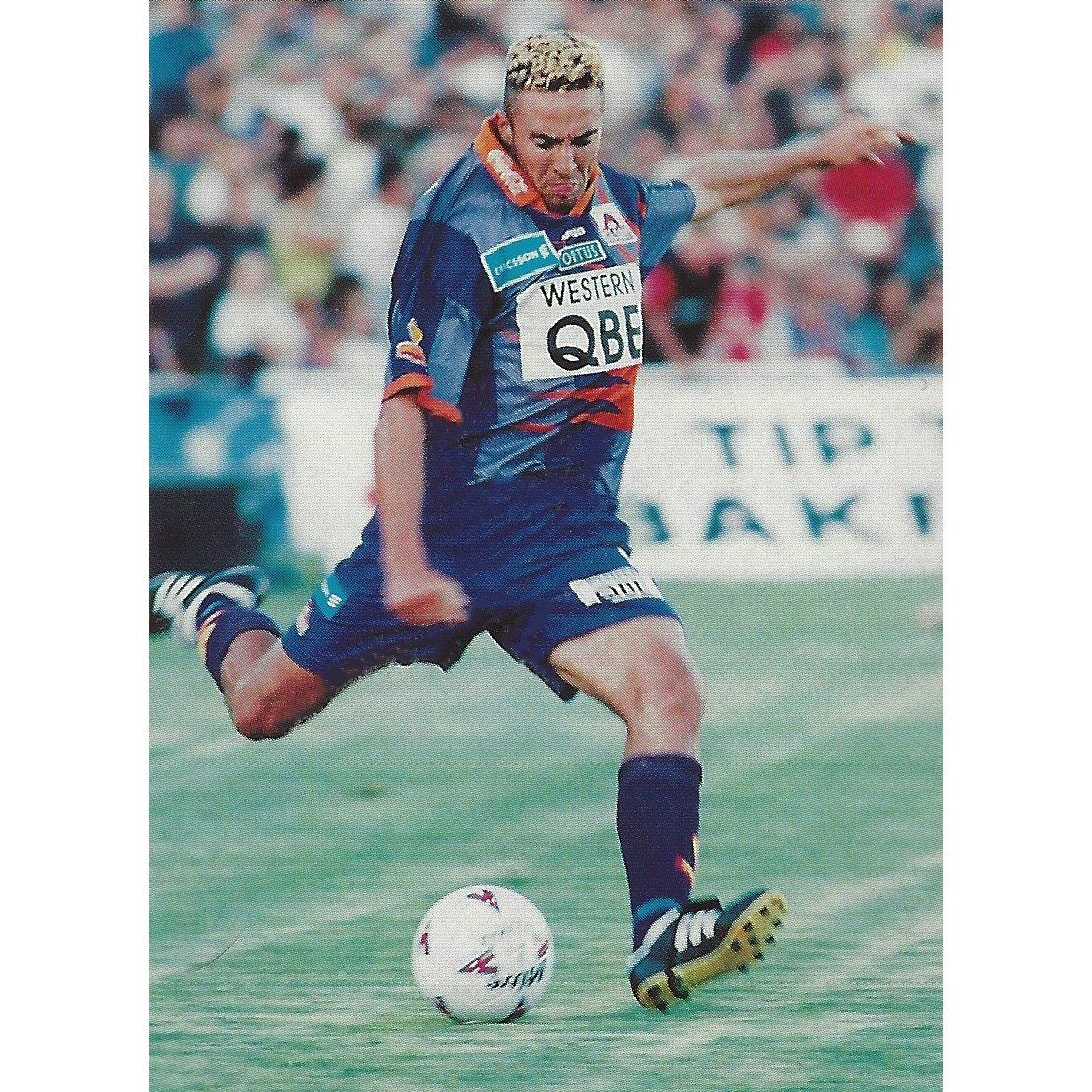
- Ithier with Perth Glory in 1997

Personal information
- Full name: Douglas Edward Ithier
- Date of birth: 20 July 1974 (age 52)
- Place of birth: Perth, Western Australia
- Height: 1.87 m (6 ft 1 1/2 in)
- Positions: Centre-back; midfielder

Youth career
- 1981: Yakamia SC
- 1982–1984: Albany Primary
- 1985–1992: Bunbury Tricolore

Senior career*
Years	Team	Apps	(Gls)
1987–1993	Bunbury Tricolore	135	(27)
1994–1996	Floreat Athena	93	(15)
1996–1997	Perth Glory	15	(0)
1998	Sarawak FA	22	(3)
1998	Walsall	3	(1)
1999	Marine Castle United	18	(1)
2000–2002	Floreat Athena	62	(19)
2003	Western Knights	8	(3)
2003	Chengdu Wuniu	23	(0)
2003–2005	Western Knights	32	(6)

International career
1993	Australian Amateur Team		
Medal record
Western Knights
Third place	WA State League	2005
Winner	WA State League	2004
Winner	WA Top 5 Cup	2004
Runner-up	WA Night Series	2004
Runner-up	WA Top 5 Cup	2003
Winner	WA Night Series	2003
Runner-up	WA BGC Lightning Cup	2003
Floreat Athena
Runner-up	WA State League	2002
Runner-up	WA Top 5 Cup	2002
Runner-up	WA Top 5 Cup	2001
Runner-up	WA Boral Cup	2001
Third place	WA State League	2001
Winner	WA Night Series	2000
Runner-up	WA Night Series	1999
Sarawak
Winner	FAM Charity Shield	1998
Floreat Athena
Winner	WA State League	1997
Winner	Divella Cup	1997
Winner	WA Night Series	1997
Third place	WA State League	1994
Runner-up	WA Night Series	1994
Bunbury Tricolore
Winner	WAASSA 1st Div League	1992
Winner	WAASSA Amateur Cup	1992
Winner	SWSA Carnival Cup	1992
Winner	WAASSA 2nd Div Reserves	1991
Runner-up	WAASSA 3rd Div Reserves	1990
- * Club domestic league appearances and goals

Doug Ithier (born 20 July 1974) is an Australian footballer who played for Perth Glory, Walsall, and throughout Asia including Malaysia, Singapore, Indonesia, and China. Ithier was widely regarded as a tough tackling, no nonsense defender, who was great in the air and would score long range goals and free-kicks despite playing most of his career as a centre-back and was the youngest starting player in Perth Glory's first-ever competitive match, 13 October 1996, aged 22 years and 85 days.

== Early life ==
Douglas Edward Ithier was born on 20 July 1974, in Middle Swan, Western Australia, Australia, and is the first son of Doug snr (a Mauritius born immigrant) and Mary. At the age of 2 his mother separated from his father and they moved to a country town of Albany, Western Australia where Ithier played for Yakamia SC and then Albany Primary until moving to Bunbury at the age of 9 to play for Bunbury Tricolore juniors. Supporting Liverpool F.C. from the age of 4, his childhood footballing heroes were John Barnes and Craig Johnston.

Ithier and his single parent mother moved to Bunbury and lived in a rough area of Government State Housing suburb called Withers, Western Australia which is located 350m from the Bunbury Tricolore SC grounds. His young days were spent racing home from school to attend training and it is well known by club officials that Ithier would help with duties around the club that formed his work ethic and strong discipline.

Ithier won individual Fairest and Best awards for every junior team he played for from Under 8's up to Under 16 age groups.

Ithier began playing men's football aged 15 and was playing junior Under 16 age group football on Saturdays and men's 4th team amateur football on Sundays. In 1992 he won the Fairest and Best player for the whole SWSA 2nd Division men's competition as a 15 year old playing in defence as a sweeper.

From the age of 4 and a half until 17 and three quarters, Ithier played as a centre-forward scoring goals in many ways and was particularly good in the air heading from set pieces. But he was signed to his first professional contract as a centre-back after he was told by his Floreat Athena manager Eric Williams when signing that he was a good Striker, but would only make money as a defender.

== Career ==
=== Bunbury Tricolore SC ===
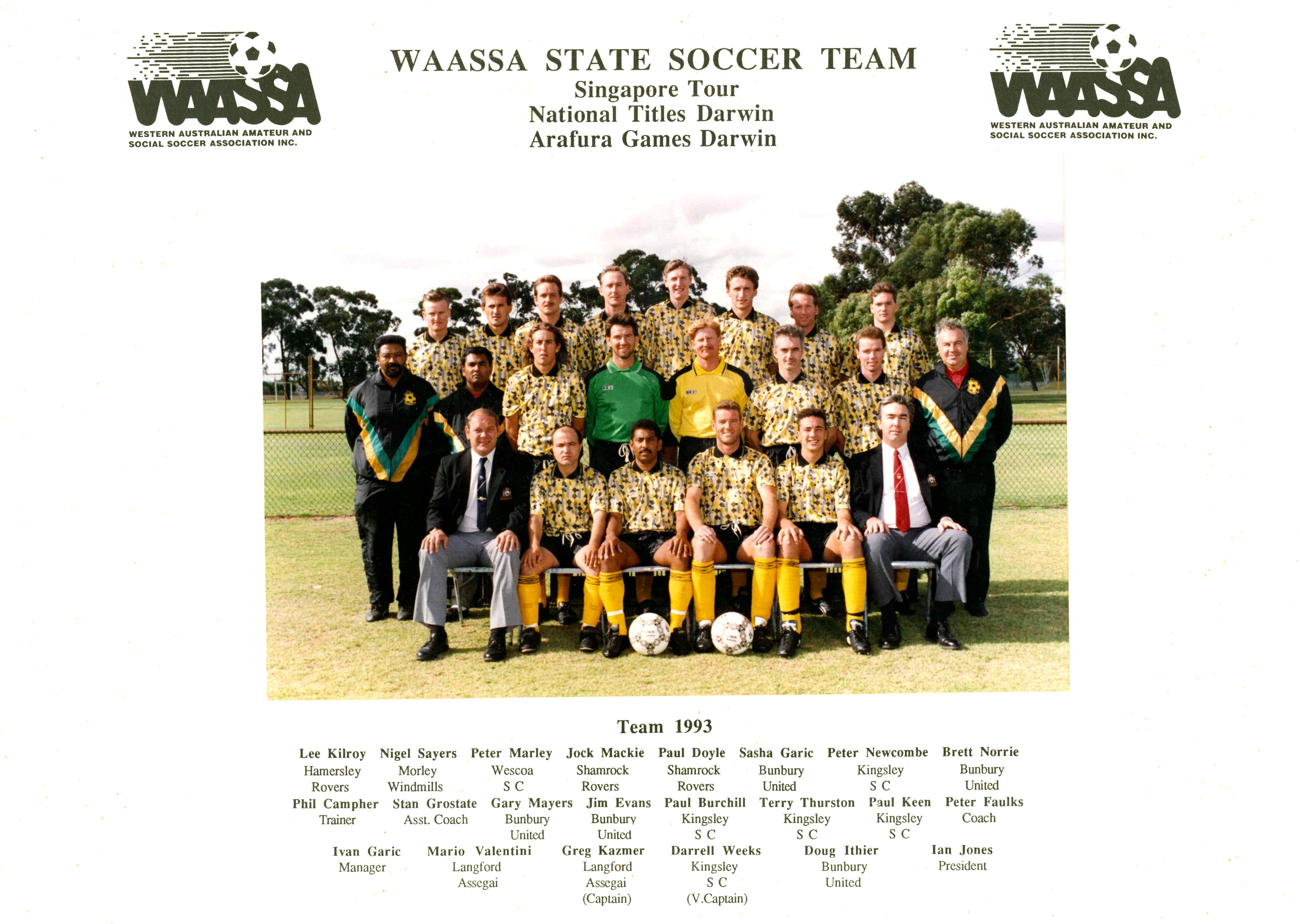
An 18 yo Ithier in the WAASSA State team photo

In 1990 at the age of 16 Ithier started his senior career with Bunbury Tricolore SC. In his 3rd year with the club in 1992 he won the WAASSA 1st Division League title and WAASSA Amateur Cup double. He was the club's youngest ever captain in 1993, was selected in the WAASSA State team and competed in the Australian Amateur Titles – Arafura Games where he was named Western Australia's best player, was voted 3rd best player of the tournament and selected in the 1993 Australian Amateur team.

=== Floreat Athena ===
In 1994 Ithier signed with Floreat Athena and was runner up 1994 Rookie of the Year. Dubbed the "Adopted Greek" during his 9 years on and off with Floreat Athena, Ithier was renowned for spectacular long range goals (including one from the halfway line in the 2001 Night Series Final), specialty freekicks, and bone crunching tackles.

As club co-captain, Ithier won the 1996 Floreat Athena Fairest and Best player and was voted 4th Best Player in the WA State League competition which led to Ithier being invited to trial with the newly formed Perth Glory and subsequent signing after 2 weeks impressing then coach Gary Marocchi.

Ithier was able to figure heavily in Athena's treble-winning team of 1997 in Perth Glory's off season, regarded as one of Athena's best years, winning the WA State League, Divella Cup and WA Night Series trophies under coach and former Greek legend Jim Pyrgolis. Ithier is one of only five players elevated to "Legend" status as listed on the club's website.

=== Perth Glory ===
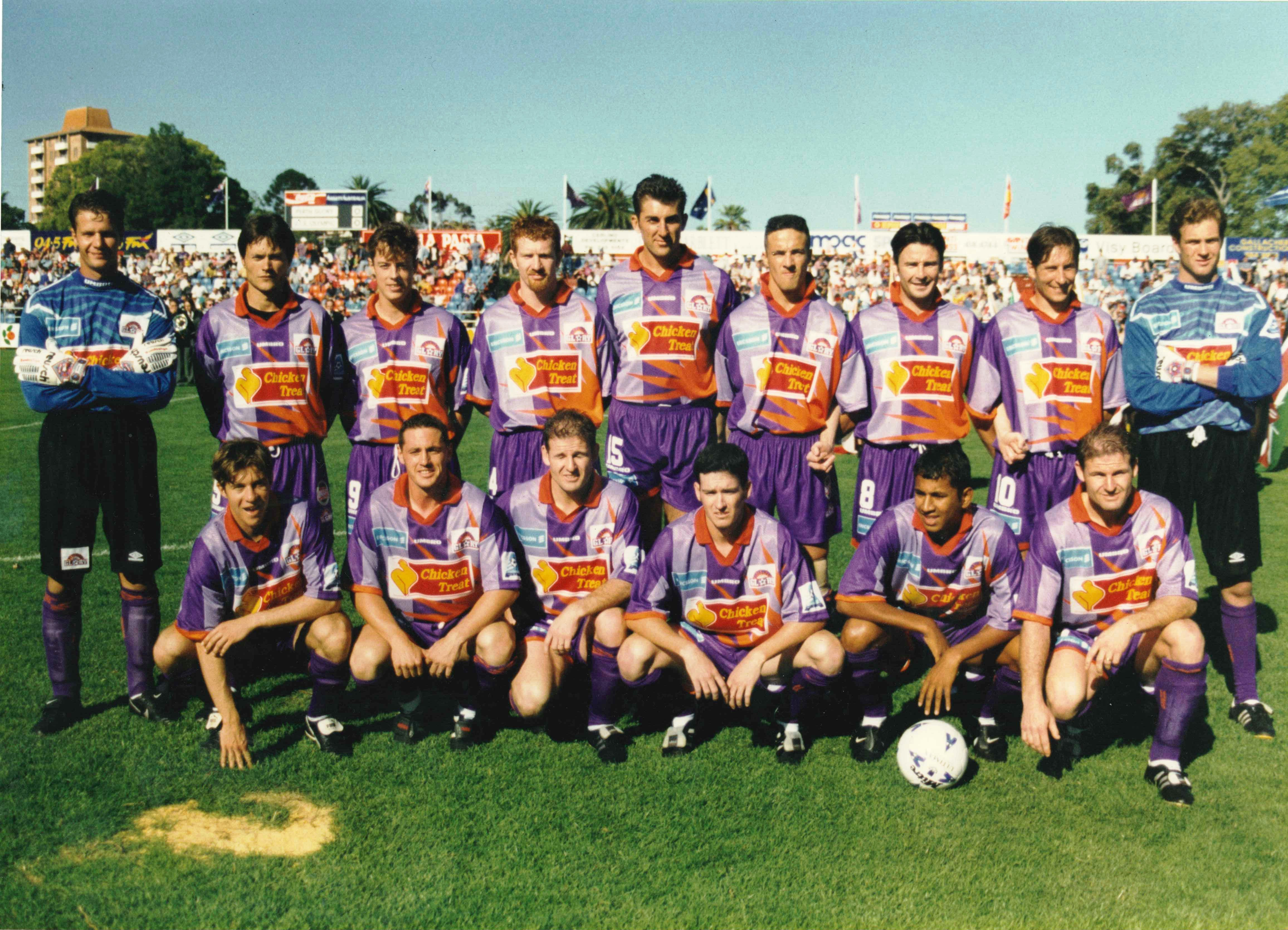
Ithier in the 1996 Perth Glory inaugural team photo

Ithier played in the inaugural season with the first Perth Glory game held at Perth Oval on 13 October 1996 versus UTS Olympic currently Sydney Olympic FC and despite the team losing the game 1–4, Ithier received the first ever Perth Glory Man-of-the-Match award for his defensive efforts against Kris Trajanovski. In his 2 seasons Ithier being WA born was a cult figure amongst Perth Glory supporters for his flamboyant, aggressive play and changing hairstyles.

=== Sarawak FA ===
In 1998 Ithier started his Asian career with 1997 Malaysian Super League champions Sarawak FA with notable players Alistair Edwards and Billy Bone and under the guidance of Alan Vest. In his debut game Ithier won the 1998 Malaysia Charity Shield against Selangor FA in which Sarawak FA won 3–1 with 9 players at a sold out Sarawak Stadium. Playing in the sweeper role Ithier flourished and quickly became a crowd favorite scoring game winning goals like his free-kick against Perlis F.A. Alan Vest once described Ithier as the "Best Header" of the ball in all Malaysia and named him Captain of the side in Billy Bone's absence. Ithier's form in Malaysia earned him the trial with Blackburn Rovers F.C.

=== Blackburn Rovers F.C. ===
In 1998, Ithier had a three-week trial with 1994/95 English Premier League Champions Blackburn Rovers. This side, managed by Roy Hodgson, included such players as Chris Sutton, Damien Duff, Colin Hendry and Martin Dahlin. Ithier was refused the relevant work permit however.

=== Walsall F.C. ===
Ithier signed to play for the English First Division (now EFL Championship) side Walsall whilst processing his work permit, and played 3 games but without the European heritage required to play in the English Premier League and not wanting to play lower divisions whilst waiting, Ithier decided to return and focus on plying his trade in Asia.

=== Marine Castle United ===
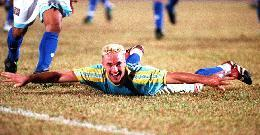
Ithier celebrates goal in S-League

After returning from the UK, Ithier signed with S-League team Marine Castle United for the 1999 season. Ithier will be remembered in Singapore for his blond hair and colourfully designed Adidas boots.

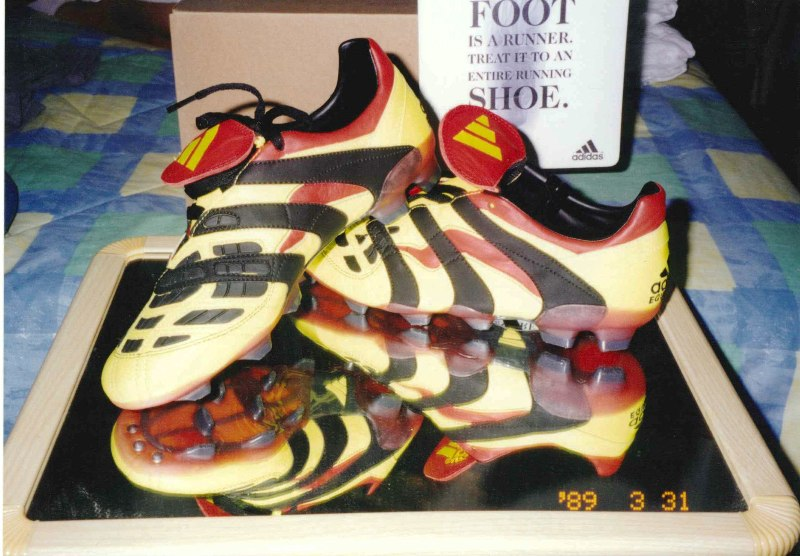
Ithier's personally designed Adidas Boots

He was selected as one of the best foreign players and played in the S-League All Stars game. He was again a crowd favorite and constantly surrounded by fans after the game even when the team performed badly, giving autographs.

Ithier was involved in a life-threatening incident whilst playing against Tanjong Pagar United Football Club. He rose to head a ball from a corner and collided with a player being knocked unconscious. The home side Tanjong Pagar FC did not have an ambulance present, and Ithier was saved by the Marine Castle's physio. Tanjong Pagar United embroiled in controversy was fined by the S-League and the decision resulted in the safety procedures at all clubs to be re-written. Ithier played the following week against doctors advice and was named Man-of-The Match!

=== Floreat Athena ===
In 2000 Ithier returned for his second stint with Floreat Athena winning the 2000 Night Series final 6-0 versus Inglewood United FC scoring the 3rd goal. In 2001 Floreat Athena finished runner up in the night series despite Ithier scoring a goal from the halfway line in the 2001 Night Series Final. In 2002 Floreat Athena finished runner up in the WA State League.

=== Western Knights SC ===
In 2003 Ithier was recruited by former Floreat Athena teammate Ronnie Campbell and signed with Western Knights SC. Ithier won the 2003 Night Series in his first season with the club and after a strong early season Ithier was attracting interest from Asian sides once more.

=== Chengdu Wuniu ===
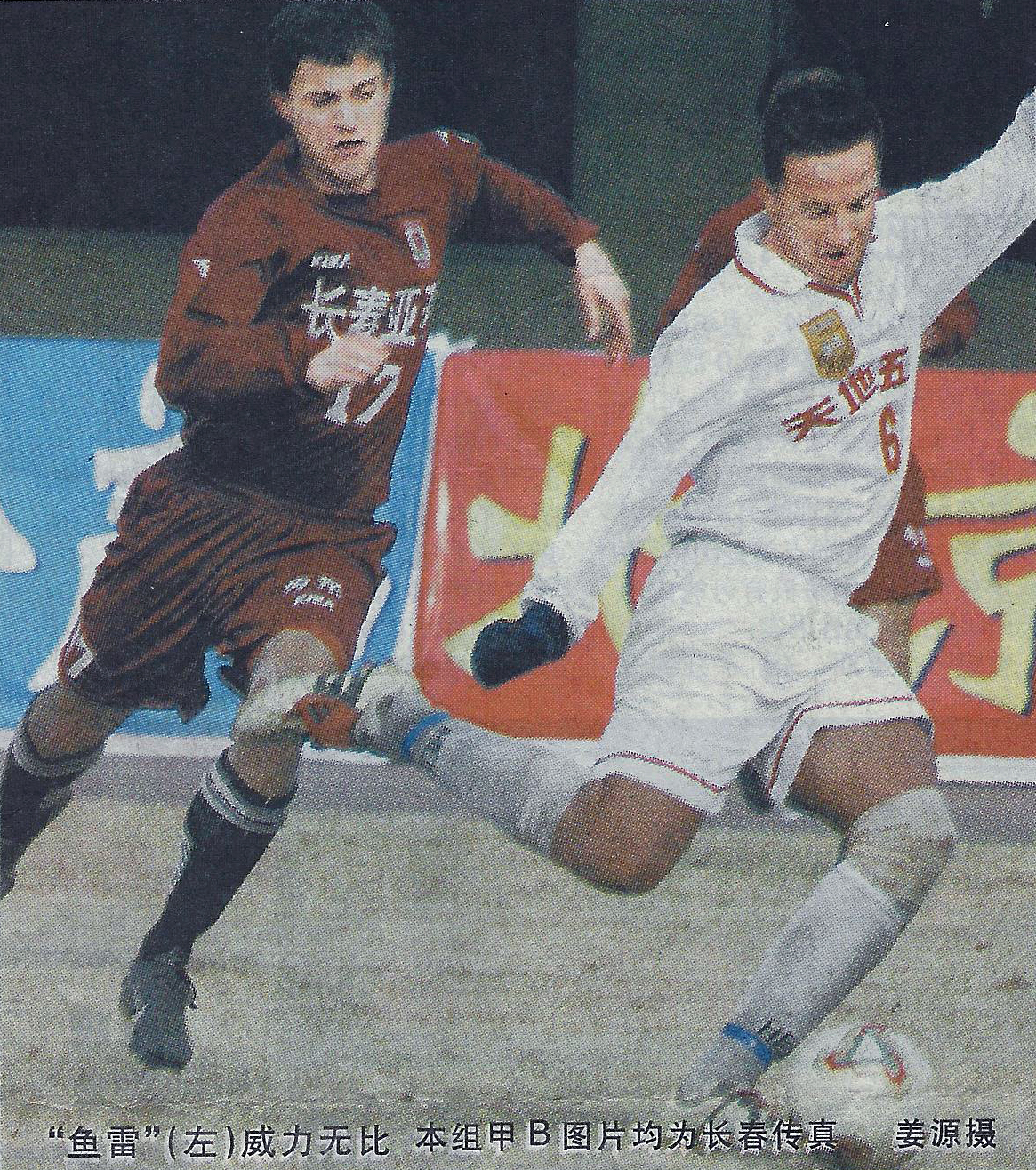
Ithier playing Chengdu in the Chinese Professional League in 2003

Ithier signed with Chinese professional football club based in Chengdu, China Chengdu Wuniu F.C. (currently Chengdu Tiancheng F.C.).

The club was known as Chengdu Five Bulls named after their first sponsor, the Five Bulls Cigarette Company and Ithier played alongside former Cameroon national player Joseph N'Do, Brazilian player Milson and many Chinese national team players.

Four games into the season the Chinese Professional league was suspended due to the 2002–2004 SARS outbreak putting Ithier's career on hold as he returned to Perth with fears the outbreak would end the season. The season was renewed after a 6-week break with the team finishing a respectable 6th position.

=== Western Knights SC ===
In 2004 Ithier returned to play for Western Knights SC as he decided his future and subsequently won the WA State League and WA Top 5 Cup Double, and finished runner up in the WA Night Series. Towards the end of the 2004 season Ithier damaged his L3/L4 spinal disc in a training session incident, but played out the year choosing to delay the required surgery until the end of the season. Ithier played the 2005 season but suffered in constant back pain and this would be the last season of his career.

=== WA State Teams ===
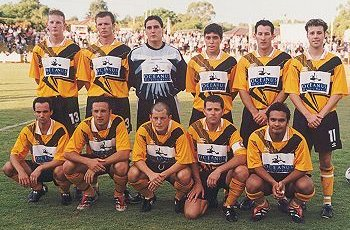
Ithier before playing Red Star Belgrade in 2001

Ithier represented the senior Western Australia team 10 times scoring on 4 occasions from 1996 to 2003, including playing against Red Star Belgrade, the Indonesia national football team, the Singapore national football team, and Sarawak FA in a match played November 1997 in Sarawak Stadium Sarawak in which Ithier impressed the local side who ended signing Ithier 4 months later for the 1998 Malaysian Super League season as a result.

Ithier first represented Western Australia in 1991 as a junior Captaining the WAASSA State U/18's side to go undefeated in its country tour that year.

=== Hall of Fame ===
On 17 July 2009 Ithier was officially inducted into the South West Soccer Hall of Fame as a Champion for his recognition in being the first Western Australian country based player to rise through the Amateur junior and senior grades playing with Bunbury Tricolore (currently named Bunbury United) and play professionally for Perth Glory. Ithier's achievement helped create the pathway for many young country based players to follow their careers including Josh Risdon who went on further to represent the Socceroos. Ithier is currently listed as a Club Legend on Bunbury United's website for his achievement's with the club.

In 2021, as part of Floreat Athena's 70th anniversary celebrations, a Dream Team of all past and current players was voted for and Ithier was nominated in the Defender position.

== Personal life ==
Ithier retired from playing in 2005 aged 30 and is currently the CEO/founder of Ten Squared Global Trade, managing director of Vital Property Group and co-owner of South Perth Cycles in Perth, Western Australia. He has Mauritian ancestry. He is separated and has one son. He is an avid cyclist formerly racing A-Grade in the West Coast Masters (WCMCC) and a golfer playing on single figure handicap.

Ithier continues to support Liverpool F.C. as a lifelong fan and visited Anfield for the first time in 2008 and met his favorite Liverpool player Steven Gerrard in a 2015 Dubai holiday.
