= Paul Afkos =

Australian businessman

Paul Afkos is an Australian businessman of Greek background, former football (soccer) administrator and political aspirant. He is father of former footballer James Afkos. He was born in Nestorio, Greece before migrating to Perth, Western Australia.

== Football (soccer) ==
=== Perth Glory ===
Afkos is most famous in Perth for being a co-owner of football (soccer) team Perth Glory until 2002.

In 2006 a bid was made by Afkos and a number of associates to buy out the 75% share of Perth Glory owned by Nick Tana. It was reported that the amount offered was A$1m.

=== NSL bid ===
In 2000 Afkos (while still a shareholder in Perth Glory) as president of the Soccer Administration of Western Australia was a backer of an unsuccessful Soccer West Coast bid for a second Perth team in the National Soccer League. Other backers included prominent Perth businessmen David Schrandt – then-president of Soccer West Coast – and Len Buckeridge.

=== Soccer Australia ===
He later became a board member of Soccer Australia. He was part of what became known as the rump board, members who refused to be replaced prior to the takeover of Frank Lowy in 2003.

== Politics ==
Afkos in 2003 was endorsed as Liberal Party candidate for the electorate of Stirling. He was praised by then-Prime Minister John Howard as he launched his campaign: "He has been in every sense a wonderful citizen of this country and I'm proud to have him as the Liberal Party candidate."

In early 2004 allegations involving Afkos' connections with a convicted drug dealer emerged leading to his resigning of his candidacy in early 2004. The drug dealer, Constantinos Papakostas, was caught by police selling speed in a car owned by Afkos. It was also alleged that Afkos had lent him money. Papacostas was subsequently sentenced to eight years in prison.

== Civic activities ==
Afkos as of 2008 is chair of business group Business Improvement Group of Northbridge (BIG-N). Afkos has been actively involved with making the Northbridge area safer including support for a plan to introduce metal detectors in licensed venues. Afkos is a former president of the Hellenic Community of Western Australia.

== Afkos Industries ==
Afkos is managing director of design and engineering company Afkos Industries who specialise in working in the resources sector.
