= Mohammed Mouhouti =

Moroccan footballer

Personal information
- Date of birth: February 8, 1972 (age 54)
- Place of birth: Morocco
- Position: Midfielder

Senior career*
Years	Team	Apps	(Gls)
1995	De Graafschap		
- Go Ahead Eagles
- Vitesse Arnhem
- Heracles Almelo
2002–2003	Perth Glory	8	(0)
- * Club domestic league appearances and goals

Mohammed Mouhouti (born February 8, 1972, in Morocco) is a retired footballer. He played in the Netherlands for various teams, spending six years in the Eerste Divisie with Heracles Almelo, and for Perth Glory in the Australian National Soccer League.
