= Alan MacKenzie =

Scottish footballer

Alan Mackenzie
Personal information
- Date of birth: 8 August 1966 (age 60)
- Place of birth: Edinburgh, Scotland
- Position: Forward

Team information
- Current team: Bassendean Caledonians

Senior career*
Years	Team	Apps	(Gls)
1984–1986	Cowdenbeath	20	(0)
1986–1987	Berwick Rangers	20	(1)
1987	FC Hämeenlinna		
1987–1988	East Stirlingshire	1	(0)
1988–1991	Cowdenbeath	90	(30)
1991–1993	Raith Rovers	45	(6)
1993–1995	Clyde	47	(6)
1995–1996	Cowdenbeath	8	(3)
1996–1997	Perth Glory	12	(2)
1997–2000	Bayswater City SC		
2000–2002	Whitburn Juniors		(19)
2002–2004	Inglewood United		
- * Club domestic league appearances and goals

Alan Mackenzie (born 8 August 1966) is a Scottish former footballer. Mackenzie played for a number of Scottish clubs most notably for Cowdenbeath and Raith Rovers.

Mackenzie holds the record of being the first Clyde player to score at Broadwood Stadium, scoring the first goal at their new ground in 1994.

In 1996, he moved to Australia where he scored Perth Glory's first ever goal in their first match on 13 October 1996 in the National Soccer League.

MacKenzie also played in the West Australian State League for Bayswater City SC, where he won the Premier League Player of the Year award in 2000, and Inglewood United.

He later moved back to Scotland for a stint with Whitburn Junior F.C.
