= List of Football Kingz FC players =

Football Kingz Football Club, an association football club based in Auckland, was founded in 1999. They were admitted into the National Soccer League for the 1999–2000 season until the club folded in 2004.

Harry Ngata held the record for the greatest number of appearances for Football Kingz. The New Zealand midfielder played 123 times for the club. The club's goalscoring record was also held by Harry Ngata who scored 29 goals.

== Key ==
- The list is ordered first by date of debut, and then if necessary in alphabetical order.
- Appearances as a substitute are included.

Positions key
GK	Goalkeeper
DF	Defender
MF	Midfielder
FW	Forward

Nationality
Unless otherwise noted, the nationality of a player is determined by the country/countries which he has played for, or if said person has not played international football, their country of birth.
Club career
Club career is defined as the first and last calendar years in which the player appeared for the club in any of the competitions listed below.
Total appearances and Total goals
Total appearances and goals comprise those in the National Soccer League.

== Players ==
List of Football Kingz FC players
Player	Nationality	Pos	Club career	Starts	Subs	Total	Goals
Player	Nationality	Pos	Club career	Appearances			Goals
Che Bunce	New Zealand	DF	1999–2001	35	8	43	2
Fred de Jong	New Zealand	FW	1999–2000	21	0	21	6
Chris Jackson	New Zealand	MF	1999–2004	91	8	99	1
Dino Mennillo	Australia	MF	1999–2000	14	1	15	4
Robbie Middleby	New Zealand	MF	1999–2000	17	4	21	1
David Moya	Chile	DF	1999–2000	7	9	16	0
Levent Osman	New Zealand	DF	1999–2002	53	16	69	2
Jonathan Perry	New Zealand	DF	1999–2003	77	13	90	7
Wynton Rufer	New Zealand	FW	1999–2001	28	20	48	12
Aaron Silva	Chile	FW	1999–2001	23	9	32	13
Marcus Stergiopoulos	Australia	MF	1999–2000	23	5	28	1
Michael Utting	New Zealand	GK	1999–2000; 2002–2004	49	0	49	0
Riki van Steeden	New Zealand	DF	1999–2003	32	16	48	2
Ivan Vicelich	New Zealand	DF	1999–2001	45	1	46	6
Harry Ngata	New Zealand	MF	1999–2004	112	16	128	29
Jason Batty	New Zealand	GK	1999–2000	12	0	12	0
Batram Suri	Solomon Islands	FW	1999–2000	4	9	13	2
Lee Jones	New Zealand	DF	1999–2001	24	8	32	2
Stu Riddle	New Zealand	FW	1999–2000	4	5	9	2
Aaran Lines	New Zealand	MF	1999–2001	28	1	29	2
Mark Elrick	New Zealand	FW	2000	3	3	6	1
Jeff Campbell	New Zealand	MF	2000–2001; 2002–2004	53	23	76	3
Danny Duke	New Zealand	GK	2000	8	0	8	0
Noah Hickey	New Zealand	MF	2000–2001; 2004	15	7	22	3
Leigh Kenyon	New Zealand	FW	2000; 2001	2	6	8	0
John Lammers	Netherlands	FW	2000	6	2	8	0
Andreas Bluhm	Germany	FW	2000–2001	16	5	21	1
Michael Cartwright	Australia	DF	2000–2001	22	3	25	1
Gerard Davis	New Zealand	DF	2000–2002	13	15	28	0
Dennis Ibrahim	Germany	FW	2000–2001	17	7	24	12
Chris Marsh	New Zealand	GK	2000–2001	12	0	12	0
Tim Stevens	New Zealand	FW	2000–2001	8	7	15	4
Paul Urlovic	New Zealand	FW	2000–2003	45	14	59	16
Julio Cuello	Australia	GK	2000–2001	9	0	9	0
Mark Burton	New Zealand	MF	2000–2004	59	3	62	3
Sean Douglas	New Zealand	DF	2000–2002	34	1	35	0
Simon Eaddy	New Zealand	GK	2000–2001	8	0	8	0
Mark Atkinson	New Zealand	MF	2001–2003	26	2	28	0
Vinko Buljubasic	Australia	DF	2001–2002	4	3	7	0
George Goutzioulis	Australia	DF	2001–2002	17	2	19	3
John Markovski	Australia	FW	2001–2002	21	2	23	1
Michael Theoklitos	Australia	GK	2001–2002	20	0	20	0
Andrew Vlahos	Australia	FW	2001–2003	45	0	45	9
Hiroshi Miyazawa	Japan	DF	2001–2003	26	8	34	0
James Bannatyne	New Zealand	GK	2001–2003	5	2	7	0
Campbell Banks	New Zealand	FW	2001–2002; 2003	10	7	17	3
Launce Eason	New Zealand	FW	2001	0	2	2	0
Craig Wylie	Australia	DF	2001–2002; 2003–2004	6	5	11	0
Robert Hooker	Australia	DF	2002	10	0	10	0
Sean Fallon	New Zealand	MF	2002	0	1	1	0
Scott Bishop	New Zealand	GK	2002	1	0	1	0
Patricio Almendra	Chile	MF	2002–2003	18	0	18	6
Mark Beldham	New Zealand	MF	2002–2003	8	12	20	2
Jonathon Taylor	New Zealand	DF	2002–2003	14	2	16	0
Raffaele de Gregorio	New Zealand	MF	2002–2003	1	20	21	1
Johnny Foundoulakis	New Zealand	MF	2002	0	2	2	0
Steven Turner	New Zealand	MF	2002–2003	4	10	14	0
Paul Dempsey	England	MF	2002	0	2	2	0
James Pritchett	New Zealand	DF	2002–2003	13	0	13	0
Ben Sigmund	New Zealand	DF	2002	1	0	1	0
Darren Young	New Zealand	DF	2002–2003	5	3	8	0
Mauro Donoso	Chile	DF	2003–2004	25	0	25	1
Con Anthopoulos	Australia	DF	2003	8	0	8	0
Jeremy Christie	New Zealand	MF	2003–2004	14	4	18	1
Glen Collins	New Zealand	MF	2003–2004	14	4	18	0
Paul Harries	Australia	FW	2003–2004	9	3	12	1
Tallan Martin	Australia	FW	2003–2004	9	12	21	3
David Rayner	New Zealand	DF	2003–2004	9	5	14	0
Jason Rowley	New Zealand	DF	2003–2004	22	1	23	3
Paul Seaman	England	MF	2002–2003	3	3	6	0
John Tambouras	New Zealand	DF	2003–2004	21	0	21	1
Aleksander Midtsian	Norway	DF	2003	9	1	10	1
Ross Nicholson	New Zealand	GK	2003–2004	10	1	11	0
Espen Schjerven	Norway	FW	2003–2004	14	0	14	1
Brad Scott	Australia	FW	2003–2004	6	5	11	0
Chad Coombes	New Zealand	MF	2003–2004	0	6	6	0
Tamati Williams	New Zealand	GK	2003	1	0	1	0
Danny Hay	New Zealand	DF	2004	7	0	7	1
Michael Williams	New Zealand	MF	2004	1	4	5	0
