= 2000–01 Football Kingz FC season =

Football Kingz
2000–01 season
- Stadium: Ericsson Stadium; Westpac Trust Stadium; Jade Stadium
- National Soccer League: 8th
- Top goalscorer: Dennis Ibrahim (12)
- Highest home attendance: 13,111 vs. Marconi Fairfield (16 March 2001); National Soccer League
- Lowest home attendance: 3,030 vs. Sydney Olympic (26 January 2001); National Soccer League
- Average home league attendance: 6,619
- Biggest win: 5–1 vs. Newcastle United (27 October 2000); National Soccer League
- Biggest defeat: 1–6 vs. South Melbourne (25 April 2001); National Soccer League

The 2000–01 season was the second season in the history of Football Kingz. It was also the second season in the National Soccer League.

== Players ==
Note: Flags indicate national team as defined under FIFA eligibility rules; some limited exceptions apply. Players may hold more than one non-FIFA nationality.

| No. | Pos. | Nation | Player |
|---|---|---|---|
| 1 | GK | AUS | Julio Cuello |
| 2 | DF | NZL | Che Bunce |
| 3 | MF | NZL | Aaran Lines |
| 4 | DF | AUS | Levent Osman |
| 5 | DF | NZL | Jonathan Perry |
| 6 | MF | NZL | Chris Jackson |
| 7 | FW | NZL | Wynton Rufer |
| 8 | DF | NZL | Gerard Davis |
| 9 | FW | NZL | Paul Urlovic |
| 10 | MF | GER | Andreas Bluhm |
| 11 | FW | GER | Dennis Ibrahim |
| 12 | MF | NZL | Harry Ngata (Captain) |
| 13 | MF | NZL | Jeff Campbell |

| No. | Pos. | Nation | Player |
|---|---|---|---|
| 14 | MF | NZL | Noah Hickey |
| 15 | DF | NZL | Ivan Vicelich |
| 16 | DF | NZL | Lee Jones |
| 17 | FW | NZL | Leigh Kenyon |
| 18 | DF | AUS | Michael Cartwright |
| 20 | GK | NZL | Chris Marsh |
| 21 | DF | NZL | Riki van Steeden |
| 22 | FW | CHI | Aaron Silva |
| 23 | GK | NZL | Simon Eaddy |
| 25 | FW | NZL | Tim Stevens |
| 26 | DF | NZL | Sean Douglas |
| 30 | MF | NZL | Mark Burton |
| — | GK | NZL | Michael Utting |

== Competitions ==
=== Overview ===
| Competition | First match | Last match | Starting round | Final position | Record | | | | | | | |
| Competition | First match | Last match | Starting round | Final position | Pld | W | D | L | GF | GA | GD | Win % |
|---|---|---|---|---|---|---|---|---|---|---|---|---|
| National Soccer League | 15 October 2000 | 29 April 2001 | Matchday 1 | 8th | 29 | 12 | 6 | 11 | 52 | 52 | +0 | 41.38 |
| Total | | | | | 29 | 12 | 6 | 11 | 52 | 52 | +0 | 41.38 |

Source: Competitions

=== National Soccer League ===
==== League table ====
| Pos | Team | Pld | W | D | L | GF | GA | GD | Pts | Qualification |
|---|---|---|---|---|---|---|---|---|---|---|
| 6 | Melbourne Knights | 30 | 14 | 7 | 9 | 61 | 46 | +15 | 49 | Qualification for the Finals series |
| 7 | Adelaide Force | 30 | 12 | 7 | 11 | 54 | 54 | 0 | 43 | |
| 8 | Football Kingz | 30 | 12 | 7 | 11 | 52 | 52 | 0 | 43 | |
| 9 | Parramatta Power | 30 | 13 | 3 | 14 | 42 | 44 | −2 | 42 | |
| 10 | Sydney United | 30 | 12 | 6 | 12 | 46 | 56 | −10 | 42 | |

Source: rsssf.com
Rules for classification: 1) Points; 2) Goal difference; 3) Goals scored

==== Results by round ====
| Round | 1 | 2 | 3 | 4 | 5 | 6 | 7 | 8 | 9 | 10 | 11 | 12 | 13 | 14 | 15 | 16 | 17 | 18 | 19 | 20 | 21 | 22 | 23 | 24 | 25 | 26 | 27 | 28 | 29 | 30 |
|---|---|---|---|---|---|---|---|---|---|---|---|---|---|---|---|---|---|---|---|---|---|---|---|---|---|---|---|---|---|---|
| Ground | A | H | H | A | H | A | H | A | H | A | H | A | A | A | H | H | A | A | H | A | H | H | H | A | H | A | H | H | H | A |
| Result | L | W | W | L | L | L | W | L | D | D | L | W | D | L | D | W | W | L | L | D | D | W | W | D | W | W | L | W | L | W |
| Position | 14 | 10 | 6 | 8 | 9 | 12 | 10 | 12 | 12 | 12 | 12 | 12 | 12 | 13 | 13 | 12 | 10 | 10 | 12 | 11 | 13 | 11 | 9 | 10 | 9 | 8 | 8 | 7 | 9 | 8 |

Source: worldfootball.net
A = Away; H = Home; W = Win; D = Draw; L = Loss

==== Matches ====
| 15 October 2000 1 | Sydney Olympic | 2–0 | Football Kingz | Sydney |
| | Moric 34'; Marusic 78' | Report | | Stadium: Belmore Sports Ground; Attendance: 5,873; Referee: M. Shield |

| 20 October 2000 2 | Football Kingz | 2–1 | Eastern Pride | Auckland |
| | Stevens 21', 53' | Report | Hutchinson 10' | Stadium: Ericsson Stadium; Attendance: 4,366; Referee: D. Rugg |

| 27 October 2000 3 | Football Kingz | 5–1 | Newcastle United | Auckland |
| | Stevens 7', 17'; Urlovic 55', 84'; Silva 88' | Report | McBreen 76' | Stadium: Ericsson Stadium; Attendance: 5,182; Referee: N. Fox |

| 3 November 2000 4 | Northern Spirit | 4–2 | Football Kingz | Sydney |
| | Burgess 23', 30', 35'; Mendez 65' (pen.) | Report | Vicelich 41'; Ngata 76' (pen.) | Stadium: North Sydney Oval; Attendance: 4,294; Referee: M. Breeze |

| 11 November 2000 5 | Football Kingz | 0–1 | Adelaide Force | Auckland |
| | | Report | Lagati 80' | Stadium: Ericsson Stadium; Attendance: 6,975; Referee: C. Diomis |

| 18 November 2000 6 | Perth Glory | 5–1 | Football Kingz | Perth |
| | Mori 29', 34', 37'; Maloney 4', 68' | Report | Urlovic 39' (pen.) | Stadium: Perth Oval; Attendance: 11,909; Referee: J. Blaney |

| 24 November 2000 7 | Football Kingz | 3–0 (Note: Awarded score. Original score 0–0; result was changed after Carlton abandoned the 2000–01 National Soccer League season after eight rounds.) | Carlton | Auckland |
| | | Report | | Stadium: Ericsson Stadium; Attendance: 6,605; Referee: B. Hugo |

| 2 December 2000 8 | Marconi Fairfield | 3–1 | Football Kingz | Sydney |
| | Browlie 21', 75'; Trajanovski 65' | Report | Burton 23' | Stadium: Marconi Stadium; Attendance: 3,087; Referee: G. Connolly |

| 8 December 2000 9 | Football Kingz | 2–2 | Melbourne Knights | Auckland |
| | Burton 84'; Rufer 88' | Report | Kiratzoglou 33'; Cervinski 89' | Stadium: Ericsson Stadium; Attendance: 5,559; Referee: M. Shield |

| 16 December 2000 10 | Brisbane Strikers | 1–1 | Football Kingz | Brisbane |
| | Foster 71' | Report | Rufer 47' | Stadium: Suncorp Stadium; Attendance: 2,665; Referee: K. Stott |

| 22 December 2000 11 | Football Kingz | 0–1 | Parramatta Power | Auckland |
| | | Report | Griffiths 19' | Stadium: Ericsson Stadium; Attendance: 8,120; Referee: S. Micallef |

| 30 December 2000 12 | Canberra Cosmos | 0–2 | Football Kingz | Canberra |
| | | Report | Ibrahim 33'; Vicelich 73' | Stadium: Bruce Stadium; Attendance: 1,534; Referee: C. Zetter |

| 5 January 2001 13 | Wollongong Wolves | 1–1 | Football Kingz | Wollongong |
| | Young 10' (pen.) | Report | Vicelich 57' | Stadium: WIN Stadium; Attendance: 4,077; Referee: M. Breeze |

| 14 January 2001 14 | South Melbourne | 3–0 | Football Kingz | Melbourne |
| | Trimboli 18' (pen.); Kalogeracos 32'; Coveny 76' | Report | | Stadium: Bob Jane Stadium; Attendance: 5,782; Referee: S. Micallef |

| 19 January 2001 15 | Football Kingz | 1–1 | Sydney United | Wellington |
| | Ibrahim 52' | Report | Awaritefe 18' | Stadium: Westpac Trust Stadium; Attendance: 11,622; Referee: J. Blaney |

| 26 January 2001 16 | Football Kingz | 1–0 | Sydney Olympic | Auckland |
| | Burton 55' | Report | | Stadium: Ericsson Stadium; Attendance: 3,030; Referee: D. Rugg |

| 3 February 2001 17 | Eastern Pride | 1–3 | Football Kingz | Morwell |
| | Motsiopoulos 72' | Report | Ibrahim 27'; Lines 49'; Urlovic 67' | Stadium: Mobil Park; Attendance: 1,239; Referee: P. Mur |

| 9 February 2001 18 | Newcastle United | 1–0 | Football Kingz | Newcastle |
| | Juchniewicz 37' | Report | | Stadium: Marathon Stadium; Attendance: 6,568; Referee: J. Blaney |

| 16 February 2001 19 | Football Kingz | 1–2 | Northern Spirit | Auckland |
| | Campbell 49' | Report | Burgess 2', 60' | Stadium: Ericsson Stadium; Attendance: 5,988; Referee: C. Zetter |

| 23 February 2001 20 | Adelaide Force | 1–1 | Football Kingz | Adelaide |
| | Day 68' | Report | Cartwright 88' | Stadium: Hidmarsh Stadium; Attendance: 3,637; Referee: C. Diomis |

| 2 March 2001 21 | Football Kingz | 3–3 | Perth Glory | Christchurch |
| | Naven 17' (o.g.); Rufer 38'; Campbell 76' | Report | Despotovski 32'; Eaddy 72' (o.g.); Harnwell 90' | Stadium: Lancaster Park; Attendance: 4,554; Referee: M. Breeze |

| 22 | Football Kingz | 3–0 (Note: Awarded score. Match was not played and was automatically awarded 3–0 to Football Kingz; result was given after Carlton abandoned the 2000–01 National Soccer League season after eight rounds.) | Carlton |

| 16 March 2001 23 | Football Kingz | 1–0 | Marconi Fairfield | Wellington |
| | Ngata 87' | Report | | Stadium: Westpac Trust Stadium; Attendance: 13,111; Referee: C. Diomis |

| 25 March 2001 24 | Melbourne Knights | 2–2 | Football Kingz | Melbourne |
| | Rajher 10'; Pelikan 54' | Report | Ibrahim 16'; Lines 73' | Stadium: Knights Stadium; Attendance: 5,226; Referee: P. Mur |

| 30 March 2001 25 | Football Kingz | 3–2 | Brisbane Strikers | Auckland |
| | Ibrahim 28', 38', 43' (pen.) | Report | Rech 23'; Harris 52' | Stadium: Ericsson Stadium; Attendance: 4,891; Referee: D. Rugg |

| 6 April 2001 26 | Parramatta Power | 1–3 | Football Kingz | Sydney |
| | Roodenburg 31' | Report | Ibrahim 14', 79'; Bluhm 90+3' | Stadium: Parramatta Stadium; Attendance: 1,544; Referee: G. Connolly |

| 13 April 2001 27 | Football Kingz | 2–3 | Canberra Cosmos | Auckland |
| | Rufer 33'; Perry 45' | Report | Ivanic 9'; Aliffi 22'; Anthopoulos 85' | Stadium: Ericsson Stadium; Attendance: 6,941; Referee: C. Zetter |

| 20 April 2001 28 | Football Kingz | 3–2 | Wollongong Wolves | Auckland |
| | Urlovic 45'; Rufer 87' (pen.), 90+2' | Report | Young 13'; Reid 50' | Stadium: Ericsson Stadium; Attendance: 3,616; Referee: N. Fox |

| 25 April 2001 29 | Football Kingz | 1–6 | South Melbourne | Auckland |
| | Silva 11' | Report | Kalogeracos 18', 27'; Vlahos 68'; Colosimo 73', 80'; Susa 84' | Stadium: Ericsson Stadium; Attendance: 8,738; Referee: D. Rugg |

| 29 April 2001 30 | Sydney United | 2–4 | Football Kingz | Sydney |
| | Asaovic 37' (pen.); Menapi 45' | Report | Ibrahim 5', 15', 20'; Perry 46' | Stadium: Sydney United Sports Centre; Attendance: 5,450; Referee: M. Shield |

== Statistics ==
=== Appearances and goals ===
Players with no appearances not included in the list.

| No. | Pos. | Nat. | Name | National Soccer League | | Total | |
| No. | Pos. | Nat. | Name | Apps | Goals | Apps | Goals |
|---|---|---|---|---|---|---|---|
| 1 | GK | (Australia) | Julio Cuello | 9 | 0 | 9 | 0 |
| 2 | DF | (New Zealand) | Che Bunce | 8(7) | 0 | 15 | 0 |
| 3 | MF | (New Zealand) | Aaran Lines | 27(1) | 2 | 28 | 2 |
| 4 | DF | (Australia) | Levent Osman | 22(5) | 0 | 27 | 0 |
| 5 | DF | (New Zealand) | Jonathan Perry | 13(6) | 2 | 19 | 2 |
| 6 | MF | (New Zealand) | Chris Jackson | 12(2) | 0 | 14 | 0 |
| 7 | FW | (New Zealand) | Wynton Rufer | 14(4) | 6 | 18 | 6 |
| 8 | DF | (New Zealand) | Gerard Davis | 10(11) | 0 | 21 | 0 |
| 9 | FW | (New Zealand) | Paul Urlovic | 17(4) | 5 | 21 | 5 |
| 10 | FW | (Germany) | Andreas Bluhm | 16(5) | 1 | 21 | 1 |
| 11 | FW | (Germany) | Dennis Ibrahim | 17(7) | 12 | 24 | 12 |
| 12 | MF | (New Zealand) | Harry Ngata | 18(10) | 2 | 28 | 2 |
| 13 | MF | (New Zealand) | Jeff Campbell | 12(2) | 2 | 14 | 2 |
| 14 | MF | (New Zealand) | Noah Hickey | 3(2) | 0 | 5 | 0 |
| 15 | DF | (New Zealand) | Ivan Vicelich | 12 | 3 | 12 | 3 |
| 16 | DF | (New Zealand) | Lee Jones | 3(3) | 0 | 6 | 0 |
| 18 | DF | (Australia) | Michael Cartwright | 22(3) | 1 | 25 | 1 |
| 20 | GK | (New Zealand) | Chris Marsh | 12 | 0 | 12 | 0 |
| 21 | DF | (New Zealand) | Riki van Steeden | 10(4) | 0 | 14 | 0 |
| 22 | FW | (Chile) | Aaron Silva | 4(4) | 2 | 8 | 2 |
| 23 | GK | (New Zealand) | Simon Eaddy | 8 | 0 | 8 | 0 |
| 25 | FW | (New Zealand) | Tim Stevens | 8(5) | 4 | 13 | 4 |
| 26 | DF | (New Zealand) | Sean Douglas | 19 | 0 | 19 | 0 |
| 30 | MF | (New Zealand) | Mark Burton | 23 | 3 | 23 | 3 |

=== Clean sheets ===
| Rank | No. | Pos | Nat | Name | National Soccer League | Total |
|---|---|---|---|---|---|---|
| 1 | 23 | GK | (New Zealand) | Simon Eaddy | 2 | 2 |
| 2 | 1 | GK | (Australia) | Julio Cuello | 1 | 1 |
| 2 | 20 | GK | (New Zealand) | Chris Marsh | 1 | 1 |
| Total | | | | | 4 | 4 |
