= List of Football Kingz FC records and statistics =

Football Kingz Football Club was a New Zealand professional association football club based in Auckland. The club was formed and admitted into the National Soccer League in 1999. The club had never qualified for the Finals series in all five seasons of existence until they became defunct alongside the National Soccer League in 2004.

The list encompasses the records set by the club, their managers and their players. The player records section itemises the club's leading goalscorers and those who have made most appearances in first-team competitions. It also records notable achievements by Football Kingz players on the international stage. Attendance records are also included.

The club's record appearance maker was Harry Ngata, who made 128 appearances between 1999 and 2004. Harry Ngata was also Football Kingz's record goalscorer, scoring 29 goals in total.

== Player records ==
=== Appearances ===
- Most appearances: Harry Ngata, 129
- Youngest player: Craig Wylie, 17 years, 314 days (against Adelaide City, 21 December 2001)
- Oldest player: Wynton Rufer, 38 years, 315 days (against Sydney United, 9 November 2001)

==== Most appearances ====
Competitive matches only, includes appearances as substitute. Numbers in brackets indicate goals scored.

Rank	Player	Years	Appearances
1	(New Zealand) Harry Ngata	1999–2004	129 (29)
2	(New Zealand) Chris Jackson	1999–2004	99 (1)
3	(New Zealand) Jonathan Perry	1999–2003	90 (7)
4	(New Zealand) Jeff Campbell	2000–2001; 2002–2004	76 (3)
5	(New Zealand) Levent Osman	1999–2002	69 (2)
6	(New Zealand) Mark Burton	2000–2004	62 (3)
7	(New Zealand) Paul Urlovic	1999–2002	59 (16)
8	(New Zealand) Michael Utting	1999–2000; 2002–2004	49 (0)
9	(New Zealand) Wynton Rufer	1999–2001	48 (12)
9	(New Zealand) Riki van Steeden	1999–2003	48 (2)

=== Goalscorers ===
- Most goals in a season: Dennis Ibrahim, 12 goals (in the 2000–01 season)
- Most goals in a match: Harry Ngata, 4 goals (against Northern Spirit, 27 September 2002)
- Youngest goalscorer: Jeff Campbell, 20 years, 220 days (against Gippsland Falcons, 1 April 2000)
- Youngest hat-trick scorer: Aaron Silva, 25 years, 96 days (against Parramatta Power, 19 April 2000)
- Oldest goalscorer: Wynton Rufer, 38 years, 112 days (against Wollongong Wolves, 20 April 2001)

==== Top goalscorers ====
Harry Ngata was the all-time top goalscorer for Football Kingz.

Competitive matches only. Numbers in brackets indicate appearances made.

Rank	Player	Years	Goals
1	(New Zealand) Harry Ngata	1999–2004	29 (128)
2	(New Zealand) Paul Urlovic	2000–2003	16 (59)
3	(Chile) Aaron Silva	1999–2001	13 (32)
4	(New Zealand) Wynton Rufer	1999–2001	12 (48)
4	(Germany) Dennis Ibrahim	2000–2001	12 (24)
6	(Australia) Andrew Vlahos	2001–2003	9 (45)
7	(New Zealand) Jonathan Perry	1999–2003	7 (90)
8	(Chile) Patricio Almendra	2002–2003	6 (21)
8	(New Zealand) Fred de Jong	1999–2000	6 (21)
8	(New Zealand) Ivan Vicelich	1999–2001	6 (6)

== Head coach records ==
- First full-time head coach: Wynton Rufer head coached Football Kingz from July 1999 to June 2001.
- Longest-serving head coach: Wynton Rufer – 1 year, 364 days (1 July 1999 to 30 June 2001)
- Shortest tenure as head coach: Shane Rufer – 6 days (3 to 9 November 2001)
- Highest win percentage: Shane Rufer, 100.00%
- Lowest win percentage: Mike Petersen, 0.00%

== Club records ==
=== Matches ===
- First National Soccer League match: Football Kingz 0–3 Carlton, National Soccer League, 1 October 1999
- Record win:
  - 4–0 against Parramatta Power, National Soccer League, 19 April 2000
  - 5–1 against Newcastle United, National Soccer League, 27 October 2000
- Record defeat: 0–7 against Parramatta Power, National Soccer League, 5 December 1997
- Record consecutive wins:
  - 3, from 15 November 2002 to 6 December 2002
- Record consecutive defeats: 7, from 15 February 2002 to 7 April 2002
- Record consecutive draws: 2, from 11 October 2002 to 20 October 2002
- Record consecutive NSL matches without a defeat: 6, from 23 February 2001 to 6 April 2001
- Record consecutive matches without a win: 10, from 2 February 2002 to 22 September 2002

=== Goals ===
- Most league goals scored in a season: 57 in 34 matches, 1999–2000
- Fewest league goals scored in a season: 25 in 24 matches, 2003–04
- Most league goals conceded in a season: 59 in 34 matches, 1999–2000
- Fewest league goals conceded in a season: 45 in 24 matches, 2002–03

=== Points ===
- Most points in a season: 50 in 34 matches, 1999–2000
- Fewest points in a season: 14 in 24 matches, 2001–02

=== Attendances ===
- Highest attendance: 13,111, against Marconi Fairfield, National Soccer League, 16 March 2001
- Lowest attendance: 892, against South Melbourne, National Soccer League, 14 February 2004
