= 1999–2000 Football Kingz FC season =

Football Kingz
1999–2000 season
- National Soccer League: 8th
- Top goalscorer: Aaron Silva (11)
- Highest home attendance: 8,200 vs. Carlton (1 October 1999); National Soccer League
- Lowest home attendance: 2,284 vs. Gippsland Falcons (3 December 1999); National Soccer League
- Average home league attendance: 4,547
- Biggest win: 4–0 vs. Parramatta Power (19 April 2000); National Soccer League
- Biggest defeat: 1–5 vs. Wollongong Wolves (12 March 2000); National Soccer League; 0–4 vs. Melbourne Knights (16 April 2000); National Soccer League

The 1999–2000 season was the first season in the history of Football Kingz. It was also the first season in the National Soccer League.

== Players ==
Note: Flags indicate national team as defined under FIFA eligibility rules; some limited exceptions apply. Players may hold more than one non-FIFA nationality.

No.	Pos.	Nation	Player
1	GK	NZL	Michael Utting
2	DF	NZL	Che Bunce
3	DF	NZL	Riki van Steeden
4	MF	AUS	Fabio Macolino
5	DF	NZL	Jonathan Perry
6	MF	AUS	Marcus Stergiopoulos
7	FW	NZL	Wynton Rufer (Captain)
8	MF	NZL	Chris Jackson
9	FW	NZL	Fred de Jong
10	MF	AUS	Dino Mennillo
11	MF	AUS	Robbie Middleby
12	MF	NZL	Harry Ngata
13	DF	AUS	Levent Osman
14	FW	SOL	Batram Suri
15	DF	NZL	Ivan Vicelich

No.	Pos.	Nation	Player
16	DF	NZL	Lee Jones
17	MF	BRA	Maciel Edmilson
18	FW	NZL	Stu Riddle
19	FW	NZL	Leigh Kenyon
20	GK	NZL	Jason Batty
21	DF	CHI	David Moya
22	FW	CHI	Aaron Silva
23	GK	NZL	Simon Eaddy
28	MF	NZL	Aaran Lines
—	MF	NZL	Jeff Campbell
—	GK	AUS	Danny Duke
—	FW	NZL	Mark Elrick
—	MF	NZL	Noah Hickey
—	FW	NED	John Lammers

== Competitions ==
=== Overview ===
Competition	First match	Last match	Starting round	Final position	Record							
Competition	First match	Last match	Starting round	Final position	Pld	W	D	L	GF	GA	GD	Win %
National Soccer League	1 October 1999	7 May 2000	Matchday 1	8th	34	15	5	14	57	59	−2	44.12
Total					34	15	5	14	57	59	−2	44.12

Source: Competitions

=== National Soccer League ===
==== League table ====
Pos	Team	Pld	W	D	L	GF	GA	GD	Pts	Qualification
1	Perth Glory	34	19	7	8	60	42	+18	64	Qualification for the Finals series
2	Wollongong Wolves (C)	34	17	9	8	72	44	+28	60	Qualification for the Finals series and the Oceania Club Championship
3	Carlton	34	17	7	10	55	39	+16	58	Qualification for the Finals series
4	Adelaide Force	34	16	8	10	57	37	+20	56	Qualification for the Finals series
5	Sydney Olympic	34	16	7	11	56	40	+16	55	Qualification for the Finals series
6	Marconi Fairfield	34	16	7	11	53	49	+4	55	Qualification for the Finals series
7	Newcastle Breakers	34	14	9	11	44	44	0	51	
8	Auckland Kingz	34	15	5	14	57	59	−2	50	
9	Brisbane Strikers	34	13	10	11	46	40	+6	49	
10	South Melbourne	34	14	7	13	55	51	+4	49	
11	Parramatta Power	34	14	5	15	52	47	+5	47	
12	Melbourne Knights	34	13	6	15	44	57	−13	45	
13	Northern Spirit	34	11	3	20	41	58	−17	36	
14	Canberra Cosmos	34	9	9	16	44	64	−20	36	
15	Gippsland Falcons	34	7	8	19	23	49	−26	29	
16	Sydney United	34	5	5	24	19	58	−39	20	

Source: rsssf.com
Rules for classification: 1) points; 2) goal difference; 3) number of goals scored.
(C) Champions

==== Results by round ====
Round	1	2	3	4	5	6	7	8	9	10	11	12	13	14	15	16	17	18	19	20	21	22	23	24	25	26	27	28	29	30	31	32	33	34
Ground	H	A	H	A	H	A	H	A	A	H	A	H	A	H	A	H	A	H	A	H	A	H	A	H	A	H	H	A	H	A	H	A	H	A
Result	L	L	W	D	D	W	L	L	W	D	W	D	L	W	D	W	L	W	L	W	W	L	L	W	L	W	L	W	W	L	L	L	W	W
Position	15	15	13	13	10	8	10	10	10	10	8	8	9	9	9	7	8	8	10	8	7	8	8	7	8	7	8	8	7	9	9	10	9	8

Source: worldfootball.net
A = Away; H = Home; W = Win; D = Draw; L = Loss

==== Matches ====
1 October 1999 1	Football Kingz	0–3	Carlton	Auckland
		Report	Moreira 27', 31'; Marth 49'	Stadium: North Harbour Stadium; Attendance: 8,200; Referee: S. Micallef

10 October 1999 2	Sydney United	2–1	Football Kingz	Sydney
	Curcija 16', 47'	Report	de Jong 33'	Stadium: Sydney United Sports Centre; Attendance: 3,136; Referee: B. Hugo

17 October 1999 3	Football Kingz	1–0	South Melbourne	Auckland
	Silva 32'	Report		Stadium: North Harbour Stadium; Attendance: 4,500; Referee: M. Shield

22 October 1999 4	Newcastle Breakers	1–1	Football Kingz	Newcastle
	Buonavoglia 4'	Report	Rufer 82'	Stadium: Breakers Stadium; Attendance: 6,045; Referee: C. Diomis

29 October 1999 5	Football Kingz	3–3	Wollongong Wolves	Auckland
	de Jong 51'; Mennillo 77'; Jones 89'	Report	Horsley 3'; Reid 38'; Masi 61'	Stadium: North Harbour Stadium; Attendance: 4,500; Referee: M. Breeze

7 November 1999 6	Sydney Olympic	1–2	Football Kingz	Sydney
	Cardozo 80' (pen.)	Report	Ngata 79'; Vicelich 84'	Stadium: Belmore Sports Ground; Attendance: 5,204; Referee: S. Micallef

13 November 1999 7	Football Kingz	2–4	Wollongong Wolves	Christchurch
	Rufer 61' (pen.), 84' (pen.)	Report	Masi 36'; Chipperfield 40'; Young 70', 82' (pen.)	Stadium: Jade Stadium; Attendance: 4,186; Referee: D. Rugg

19 November 1999 8	Northern Spirit	3–2	Football Kingz	Sydney
	Bingley 33'; Saad 38'; Slater 83'	Report		Stadium: North Sydney Oval; Attendance: 8,933; Referee: M. Breeze

26 November 1999 9	Adelaide Force	2–3	Football Kingz	Adelaide
	Pelosi 46'; Mori 89'	Report	de Jong 28'; Rufer 49'; Jackson 71'	Stadium: Hindmarsh Stadium; Attendance: 4,596; Referee: G. Connolly

3 December 1999 10	Football Kingz	1–1	Gippsland Falcons	Auckland
	Middleby 15'	Report	MacNicol 49'	Stadium: North Harbour Stadium; Attendance: 2,284; Referee: D. Rugg

11 December 1999 11	Marconi Fairfield	0–3	Football Kingz	Sydney
		Report	Mennillo 37'; de Jong 64'; Steeden 86'	Stadium: Marconi Stadium; Attendance: 4,472; Referee: J. Blaney

17 December 1999 12	Football Kingz	3–3	Melbourne Knights	Auckland
	Ngata 43' (pen.), 69' (pen.); Perry 83'	Report	Kelic 35', 56'; Vassallo 75'	Stadium: North Harbour Stadium; Attendance: 3,572; Referee: G. Connolly

28 December 1999 13	Adelaide Force	2–0	Football Kingz	Adelaide
	Vidmar 30'; Mori 67'	Report		Stadium: Hindmarsh Stadium; Attendance: 5,720; Referee: E. Lennie

3 January 2000 14	Football Kingz	3–1	Canberra Cosmos	Auckland
	Silva 31'; de Jong 49'; Bunce 68'	Report	Musitano 82'	Stadium: North Harbour Stadium; Attendance: 2,512; Referee: M. Shield

7 January 2000 15	Carlton	1–1	Football Kingz	Melbourne
	Marth 89'	Report	Ngata 12'	Stadium: Olympic Park; Attendance: 3,054; Referee: G. Connolly

26 January 2000 18	Football Kingz	4–1	Perth Glory	Auckland
	Elrick 40'; Mennillo 55', 82'; Silva 89'	Report	Halpin 45'	Stadium: North Harbour Stadium; Attendance: 3,878; Referee: S. Micallef

29 January 2000 19	Brisbane Strikers	3–1	Football Kingz	Brisbane
	McLaren 2'; Baldwin 28'; Hews 48'	Report	Riddle 63'	Stadium: Suncorp Stadium; Attendance: 2,563; Referee: B. Hugo

4 February 2000 20	Football Kingz	1–0	Sydney United	Auckland
	Vicelich 51'	Report		Stadium: North Harbour Stadium; Attendance: 3,687; Referee: C. Diomis

13 February 2000 21	South Melbourne	1–3	Football Kingz	Melbourne
	Vlahos 31'	Report	van Steeden 2'; Silva 13'; Ngata 72'	Stadium: Bob Jane Stadium; Attendance: 6,178; Referee: M. Breeze

19 February 2000 22	Football Kingz	0–1	Newcastle Breakers	Wellington
		Report	Wilson 67'	Stadium: Westpac Trust Stadium; Attendance: 8,000; Referee: J. Blaney

27 February 2000 23	Wollongong Wolves	3–1	Football Kingz	Wollongong
	Young 45', 56'; Masi 49'	Report	Ngata 38' (pen.)	Stadium: Brandon Park; Attendance: 3,313; Referee: D. Rugg

3 March 2000 24	Football Kingz	2–0	Sydney Olympic	Auckland
	Perry 67'; Rufer 79'	Report		Stadium: North Harbour Stadium; Attendance: 3,762; Referee: C. Diomis

12 March 2000 25	Wollongong Wolves	5–1	Football Kingz	Wollongong
	Mennillo 48'; Reid 59'; Horsley 60'; Young 85'; Blake 90+2'	Report	Bunce 29'	Stadium: Brandon Park; Attendance: 3,618; Referee: C. Diomis

17 March 2000 26	Football Kingz	3–2	Northern Spirit	Auckland
	Rufer 20'; Ngata 55' (pen.); Perry 69'	Report	Seal 43'; Cranney 62'	Stadium: North Harbour Stadium; Attendance: 3,562; Referee: S. Micallef

23 March 2000 27	Football Kingz	0–2	Adelaide Force	Auckland
		Report	Hassell 63'; Kemp 86'	Stadium: North Harbour Stadium; Attendance: 4,323; Referee: B. Precious

26 March 2000 17	Perth Glory	3–1	Football Kingz	Perth
	Naven 20'; Harnwell 25'; Schwertz 64'	Report	Silva 65'	Stadium: Perth Oval; Attendance: 9,784; Referee: P. Mur

1 April 2000 28	Gippsland Falcons	0–2	Football Kingz	Morwell
		Report	Campbell 30'; Suri 77'	Stadium: Mobil Park; Attendance: 1,715; Referee: S. Micallef

7 April 2000 29	Football Kingz	3–1	Marconi Fairfield	Auckland
	Vicelich 21'; de Jong 57'; Perry 86'	Report	Babic 10'	Stadium: Mount Smart Stadium; Attendance: 4,877; Referee: P. Mur

16 April 2000 30	Melbourne Knights	4–0	Football Kingz	Melbourne
	Urlovic 27'; Cervinski 53', 56'; Pelikan 90+2'	Report		Stadium: Knights Stadium; Attendance: 2,510; Referee: C. Diomis

19 April 2000 16	Football Kingz	4–0	Parrmatta Power	Auckland
	Silva 29', 38', 62'; Suri 90'	Report		Stadium: North Harbour Stadium; Attendance: 4,692; Referee: J. Blaney

22 April 2000 31	Football Kingz	0–2	Adelaide Force	Auckland
		Report	Pelosi 50'; Vidmar 78'	Stadium: North Harbour Stadium; Attendance: 5,143; Referee: B. Hugo

25 April 2000 32	Canberra Cosmos	2–1	Football Kingz	Canberra
	de Jesus 33', 78'	Report	Rufer 28'	Stadium: Bruce Stadium; Attendance: 2,008; Referee: G. Connolly

29 April 2000 33	Football Kingz	2–1	Brisbane Strikers	Auckland
	Silva 23', 55'	Report	Dwyer 63'	Stadium: North Harbour Stadium; Attendance: 5,628; Referee: P. Mur

7 May 2000 34	Parramatta Power	1–2	Football Kingz	Sydney
	Taliadoros 66'	Report	Silva 24'; Jones 90+3'	Stadium: Parramatta Stadium; Attendance: 3,064; Referee: C. Zetter

== Statistics ==
=== Appearances and goals ===
Players with no appearances not included in the list.

No.	Pos.	Nat.	Name	National Soccer League		Total	
No.	Pos.	Nat.	Name	Apps	Goals	Apps	Goals
1	GK	(New Zealand)	Michael Utting	14	0	14	0
2	DF	(New Zealand)	Che Bunce	27(1)	2	28	2
3	DF	(New Zealand)	Riki van Steeden	11(9)	2	20	2
5	DF	(New Zealand)	Jonathan Perry	26(6)	4	32	4
6	MF	(Australia)	Marcus Stergiopoulos	23(5)	1	28	1
7	FW	(New Zealand)	Wynton Rufer	12(13)	6	25	6
8	MF	(New Zealand)	Chris Jackson	22(5)	1	27	1
9	FW	(New Zealand)	Fred de Jong	21	6	21	6
10	MF	(Australia)	Dino Mennillo	14(1)	4	15	4
11	MF	(Australia)	Robbie Middleby	17(4)	1	21	8
12	MF	(New Zealand)	Harry Ngata	33	7	33	7
13	DF	(Australia)	Levent Osman	22(4)	1	26	1
14	FW	(Solomon Islands)	Batram Suri	4(9)	2	13	2
15	DF	(New Zealand)	Ivan Vicelich	33(1)	3	34	3
16	DF	(New Zealand)	Lee Jones	21(5)	2	26	2
18	FW	(New Zealand)	Stu Riddle	4(5)	2	9	2
19	FW	(New Zealand)	Leigh Kenyon	1(5)	0	6	0
20	GK	(New Zealand)	Jason Batty	12	0	12	0
21	DF	(Chile)	David Moya	7(9)	0	16	0
22	FW	(Chile)	Aaron Silva	19(5)	11	24	11
28	MF	(New Zealand)	Aaran Lines	1	0	1	0
—	MF	(New Zealand)	Jeff Campbell	8(3)	1	11	1
—	GK	(New Zealand)	Danny Duke	8	0	8	0
—	FW	(New Zealand)	Mark Elrick	3(3)	1	6	1
—	MF	(New Zealand)	Noah Hickey	5(5)	0	10	0
—	FW	(Netherlands)	John Lammers	6(2)	0	8	0

=== Clean sheets ===
Rank	No.	Pos	Nat	Name	National Soccer League	Total
1	20	GK	(New Zealand)	Jason Batty	3	3
2	—	GK	(Australia)	Danny Duke	2	2
3	1	GK	(New Zealand)	Mike Utting	1	1
Total					6	6
