= 2001–02 Football Kingz FC season =

Football Kingz
2001–02 season
- Stadium: Ericsson Stadium; North Harbour Stadium
- National Soccer League: 13rd
- Top goalscorer: Paul Urlovic (9)
- Highest home attendance: 8,121 vs. South Melbourne (12 October 2001); National Soccer League
- Lowest home attendance: 2,282 vs. Adelaid Force (28 March 2002); National Soccer League
- Average home league attendance: 3,873
- Biggest win: 2–1 (twice); 1–0 (once)
- Biggest defeat: 1–7 vs. Parramatta Power (15 March 2002); National Soccer League

The 2001–02 season was the third season in the history of Football Kingz. It was also the third season in the National Soccer League.

== Players ==
Note: Flags indicate national team as defined under FIFA eligibility rules; some limited exceptions apply. Players may hold more than one non-FIFA nationality.

No.	Pos.	Nation	Player
1	GK	AUS	Michael Theoklitos
2	DF	NZL	Jonathan Perry
3	MF	NZL	Mark Atkinson
4	DF	AUS	Levent Osman
5	DF	AUS	Vinko Buljubasic
6	DF	AUS	George Goutzioulis
7	FW	NZL	Wynton Rufer
8	DF	NZL	Gerard Davis
9	FW	NZL	Paul Urlovic
11	FW	AUS	Andrew Vlahos
12	MF	NZL	Harry Ngata
13	DF	NZL	Che Bunce
14	FW	AUS	John Markovski
15	MF	NZL	Mark Burton
19	DF	JPN	Hiroshi Miyazawa
20	GK	NZL	James Bannatyne

No.	Pos.	Nation	Player
21	DF	NZL	Riki van Steeden
25	DF	NZL	Sean Douglas (Captain)
—	FW	NZL	Campbell Banks
—	GK	NZL	Scott Bishop
—	MF	NZL	Jeff Campbell
—	FW	NZL	Lance Eason
—	MF	NZL	Sean Fallon
—	DF	AUS	Robert Hooker
—	MF	NZL	Chris Jackson
—	FW	NZL	Leigh Kenyon
—	FW	NZL	Tim Stevens
—	DF	NZL	Craig Wylie
—	MF	CHI	Patricio Almendra
—	DF	NZL	James Pritchett
—	DF	NZL	Jason Rowley

== Competitions ==
=== Overview ===
Competition	First match	Last match	Starting round	Final position	Record							
Competition	First match	Last match	Starting round	Final position	Pld	W	D	L	GF	GA	GD	Win %
National Soccer League	5 October 2001	7 April 2002	Matchday 1	13rd	24	3	5	16	28	58	−30	12.50
Total					24	3	5	16	28	58	−30	12.50

Source: Competitions

=== National Soccer League ===
==== League table ====
Pos	Team	Pld	W	D	L	GF	GA	GD	Pts
9	Marconi Fairfield	24	8	6	10	33	36	−3	30
10	Wollongong Wolves	24	6	7	11	28	43	−15	25
11	Sydney United	24	6	6	12	27	37	−10	24
12	Adelaide Force	24	4	8	12	27	39	−12	20
13	Football Kingz	24	3	5	16	28	58	−30	14

Source: rsssf.com
Rules for classification: 1) Points; 2) Goal difference; 3) Goals scored

==== Results by round ====
Round	1	2	3	4	5	6	7	8	9	10	11	12	13	14	15	16	17	18	19	20	21	22	23	24	25	26
Ground	A	H	A	H	A	A	B	A	H	A	H	A	H	H	A	H	A	H	H	B	H	A	H	A	H	A
Result	L	D	L	L	D	W	✖	L	L	D	D	L	W	L	L	W	L	D	L	✖	L	L	L	L	L	L
Position	9	8	11	13	12	10	10	10	12	12	12	13	12	13	13	13	13	13	13	13	13	13	13	13	13	13

Source: worldfootball.net
A = Away; H = Home; W = Win; D = Draw; L = Loss

==== Matches ====
5 October 2001 1	Brisbane Strikers	2–1	Football Kingz	Brisbane
	Rech 22'; Foster 82'	Report	Urlovic 56'	Stadium: Ballymore Stadium; Attendance: 3,516; Referee: C. Zetter

12 October 2001 2	Football Kingz	0–0	South Melbourne	Auckland
		Report		Stadium: Ericsson Stadium; Attendance: 8,121; Referee: D. Rugg

20 October 2001 3	Marconi Fairfield	5–3	Football Kingz	Sydney
	Tome 23'; Brownlie 26'; Webb 73'; Radulovic 90+1'; Gulessarian 90+4'	Report	Urlovic 67'; Osman 75'; Markovski 87'	Stadium: Marconi Stadium; Attendance: 2,952; Referee: S. Micallef

26 October 2001 4	Football Kingz	2–7	Perth Glory	Auckland
	Vlahos 38'; Urlovic 49'	Report	Mori 6', 27', 43'; Maloney 42', 84'; Despotovski 65', 68'	Stadium: North Harbour Stadium; Attendance: 6,299; Referee: N. Fox

2 November 2001 5	Wollongong Wolves	2–2	Football Kingz	Wollongong
	McDonald 13'; Perinich 74'	Report	Perry 7'; Vlahos 71'	Stadium: WIN Stadium; Attendance: 3,322; Referee: C. Diomis

9 November 2001 6	Sydney United	1–2	Football Kingz	Sydney
	Menapi 62'	Report	Ngata 50', 70'	Stadium: Sydney United Sports Centre; Attendance: 3,817; Referee: P. Mur

23 November 2001 8	Melbourne Knights	2–1	Football Kingz	Melbourne
	Marth 89'; Da Costa 90+1'	Report	Banks 79'	Stadium: Knights Stadium; Attendance: 3,321; Referee: P. Mur

30 November 2001 9	Football Kingz	2–3	Northern Spirit	Auckland
	Goutzioulis 64'; Urlovic 69'	Report	Cardozo 48'; Griffiths 80', 83'	Stadium: Ericsson Stadium; Attendance: 4,323; Referee: M. Shield

8 December 2001 10	Parramatta Power	2–2	Football Kingz	Sydney
	Buonavoglia 27'; Arambasic 35'	Report	Urlovic 57'; Banks 90'	Stadium: Parramatta Stadium; Attendance: 2,342; Referee: S. Micallef

14 December 2001 11	Football Kingz	2–2	Newcastle United	Auckland
	Urlovic 55' (pen.); Vlahos 77'	Report	Dodd 33'; McBreen 90'	Stadium: Ericsson Stadium; Attendance: 4,937; Referee: P. Mur

21 December 2001 12	Adelaide Force	3–0	Football Kingz	Adelaide
	Brain 16'; Tunbridge 19', 53'	Report		Stadium: Hindmarsh Stadium; Attendance: 2,607; Referee: P. Green

4 January 2002 13	Football Kingz	2–1	Olympic Sharks	Auckland
	Goutzioulis 53'; Durante 87' (o.g.)	Report	Wilson 86'	Stadium: Ericsson Stadium; Attendance: 3,153; Referee: C. Diomis

11 January 2002 14	Football Kingz	1–2	Brisbane Strikers	Auckland
	Goutzioulis 7'	Report	Foster 34', 42'	Stadium: Ericsson Stadium; Attendance: 3,473; Referee: D. Rugg

18 January 2002 15	South Melbourne	2–1	Football Kingz	Melbourne
	Bacak 27'; Boutsianis 88'	Report	Urlovic 70'	Stadium: Bob Jane Stadium; Attendance: 5,021; Referee: P. Mur

25 January 2002 16	Football Kingz	1–0	Marconi Fairfield	Auckland
	Urlovic 41'	Report		Stadium: North Harbour Stadium; Attendance: 3,070; Referee: P. Green

2 February 2002 17	Perth Glory	1–0	Football Kingz	Perth
	Maloney 55'	Report		Stadium: Perth Oval; Attendance: 12,035; Referee: C. Zetter

8 February 2002 18	Football Kingz	0–0	Wollongong Wolves	Auckland
		Report		Stadium: North Harbour Stadium; Attendance: 3,199; Referee: N. Fox

15 February 2002 19	Football Kingz	0–3	Sydney United	Auckland
		Report	Menapi 22'; Deur 62'; Mendez 68'	Stadium: Ericsson Stadium; Attendance: 2,842; Referee: P. Mur

1 March 2002 21	Football Kingz	1–2	Melbourne Knights	Auckland
	Ngata 83'	Report	Sulemani 63', 68'	Stadium: Ericsson Stadium; Attendance: 2,342; Referee: D. Rugg

8 March 2002 22	Northern Spirit	2–1	Football Kingz	Sydney
	Cervinski 8'; Cardozo 76'	Report	Vlahos 52' (pen.)	Stadium: North Sydney Oval; Attendance: 3,224; Referee: C. Diomis

15 March 2002 23	Football Kingz	1–7	Parramatta Power	Auckland
	Ngata 8'	Report	Bennett 27'; Holman 40', 74'; Kwasnik 51'; Elrich 61', 88'; Thompson 84'	Stadium: Ericsson Stadium; Attendance: 2,443; Referee: C. Diomis

22 March 2002 24	Newcastle United	2–0	Football Kingz	Newcastle
	Griffiths 14'; Moreira 82' (pen.)	Report		Stadium: EnergyAustralia Stadium; Attendance: 9,544; Referee: M. Breeze

28 March 2002 25	Football Kingz	1–2	Adelaide Force	Auckland
	Urlovic 31'	Report	Pantelis 25'; Budin 35'	Stadium: Ericsson Stadium; Attendance: 2,282; Referee: N. Fox

7 April 2002 26	Olympic Sharks	5–2	Football Kingz	Sydney
	Milicic 19', 27', 57', 84'; Macallister 90+1'	Report	Banks 39'; Vlahos 55'	Stadium: Toyota Park; Attendance: 3,615; Referee: S. Micallef

== Statistics ==
=== Appearances and goals ===
Players with no appearances not included in the list.

No.	Pos.	Nat.	Name	National Soccer League		Total	
No.	Pos.	Nat.	Name	Apps	Goals	Apps	Goals
1	GK	(Australia)	Michael Theoklitos	20	0	20	0
2	DF	(New Zealand)	Jonathan Perry	22	1	22	1
3	MF	(New Zealand)	Mark Atkinson	9	0	9	0
4	DF	(Australia)	Levent Osman	9(7)	1	16	1
5	DF	(Australia)	Vinko Buljubasic	4(3)	0	7	0
6	DF	(Australia)	George Goutzioulis	17(2)	3	19	3
7	FW	(New Zealand)	Wynton Rufer	2(3)	0	5	0
8	DF	(New Zealand)	Gerard Davis	3(4)	0	7	0
9	FW	(New Zealand)	Paul Urlovic	22(1)	9	23	9
11	FW	(Australia)	Andrew Vlahos	21	5	21	5
12	MF	(New Zealand)	Harry Ngata	18(5)	4	23	4
14	FW	(Australia)	John Markovski	21(2)	1	23	1
15	MF	(New Zealand)	Mark Burton	17(5)	0	22	0
19	DF	(Japan)	Hiroshi Miyazawa	7(6)	0	13	0
20	GK	(New Zealand)	James Bannatyne	3(1)	0	4	0
21	DF	(New Zealand)	Riki van Steeden	8(1)	0	9	0
25	DF	(New Zealand)	Sean Douglas	15(1)	0	16	0
—	FW	(New Zealand)	Campbell Banks	9(7)	3	16	3
—	GK	(New Zealand)	Scott Bishop	1	0	1	0
—	MF	(New Zealand)	Jeff Campbell	6(6)	0	12	0
—	FW	(New Zealand)	Lance Eason	0(2)	0	2	0
—	MF	(New Zealand)	Sean Fallon	0(1)	0	1	0
—	DF	(Australia)	Robert Hooker	10	0	10	0
—	MF	(New Zealand)	Chris Jackson	18	0	18	0
—	FW	(New Zealand)	Leigh Kenyon	1(1)	0	2	0
—	FW	(New Zealand)	Tim Stevens	0(2)	0	2	0
—	DF	(Australia)	Craig Wylie	1(4)	0	5	0

=== Clean sheets ===
Rank	No.	Pos	Nat	Name	National Soccer League	Total
1	1	GK	(Australia)	Michael Theoklitos	3	3
Total					3	3
