= List of Football Kingz F.C. seasons =

Football Kingz Football Club was a New Zealand professional association football club based in Auckland. The club was formed in 1999 and joined the Australian National Soccer League as New Zealand's first professional club to play in Australian competition in the 1999–2000 season until they became defunct in 2004. The club's first team spent the five seasons in the National Soccer League. The table details the club's achievements in major competitions, and the top scorers for each season.

== History ==
The first season as the first New Zealand club in Australian professional soccer was to be their best season in the club's existence finishing 8th out of 16 which also involved the more points, wins and goals scored than any other season played by Football Kingz. Next season in 2000–01 finished in the same position as the previous season in eighth place spot. The last three seasons saw the huge demise into the club as the 2001–02 NSL campaign saw them finish bottom of the league out of 13 teams. Only next season saw a higher finish two places above the 13 in 11th place, but until then in their last season in 2003–04; the club received their second last place finish for the last edition of the National Soccer League and became defunct in 2004.

== Key ==
Key to league competitions:

- National Soccer League (NSL) – Australia's former top football league, established in 1977 and dissolved in 2004.

Key to colours and symbols:

| 1st or W | Winners |
| 2nd or RU | Runners-up |
| 3rd | Third place |
| ♦ | Top scorer in division |

Key to league record:

- Season = The year and article of the season
- Pos = Final position
- Pld = Matches played
- W = Matches won
- D = Matches drawn
- L = Matches lost
- GF = Goals scored
- GA = Goals against
- Pts = Points

== Seasons ==
Results of league and cup competitions by season
| Season | Division | Pld | W | D | L | GF | GA | Pts | Pos | Finals | Name(s) | Goals |
| Season | League | | | | | | | | | Finals | Top goalscorer(s) | |
|---|---|---|---|---|---|---|---|---|---|---|---|---|
| 1999–2000 | NSL | 34 | 15 | 5 | 14 | 57 | 59 | 50 | 8th | DNQ | Aaron Silva | 11 |
| 2000–01 | NSL | 30 | 12 | 7 | 11 | 52 | 52 | 43 | 8th | DNQ | Dennis Ibrahim | 12 |
| 2001–02 | NSL | 24 | 3 | 5 | 16 | 28 | 58 | 14 | 13th | DNQ | Paul Urlovic | 9 |
| 2002–03 | NSL | 24 | 6 | 6 | 12 | 26 | 45 | 24 | 11th | DNQ | Harry Ngata | 8 |
| 2003–04 | NSL | 24 | 4 | 3 | 17 | 25 | 51 | 15 | 13th | DNQ | Harry Ngata | 8 |
