= 2002–03 National Soccer League =

Australian soccer season

NSL 2002–03
- League: National Soccer League
- Sport: Association football
- Duration: 2002–2003
- Teams: 13

NSL season
- Champions: Perth Glory
- Top scorer: Damian Mori (24)

National Soccer League seasons
- ← 2001–02 2003–04 →

The 2002–03 National Soccer League season, was the 27th season of the National Soccer League in Australia. The finals format was revised for this season, with the top six teams at the end of the regular season qualifying for a home-and-away championship series. The top two teams from the championship series progressed to the grand final. Olympic Sharks were crowned premiers and Perth Glory were champions.

== Teams ==
| Team | Home city | Home ground |
|---|---|---|
| Adelaide City FC | Adelaide | Hindmarsh Stadium |
| Brisbane Strikers | Brisbane | Ballymore Stadium |
| Football Kingz | Auckland | Mt Smart Stadium |
| Marconi-Stallions | Sydney | Marconi Stadium |
| Melbourne Knights | Melbourne | Knights Stadium |
| Newcastle United | Newcastle | Newcastle Stadium |
| Northern Spirit | Sydney | North Sydney Oval |
| Olympic Sharks | Sydney | Endeavour Field |
| Parramatta Power | Sydney | Parramatta Stadium |
| Perth Glory | Perth | Perth Oval |
| South Melbourne | Melbourne | Lakeside Stadium |
| Sydney United | Sydney | Edensor Park |
| Wollongong City | Wollongong | Brandon Park |

== Regular season ==
=== League table ===
| Pos | Team | Pld | W | D | L | GF | GA | GD | Pts | Qualification |
|---|---|---|---|---|---|---|---|---|---|---|
| 1 | Olympic Sharks | 24 | 16 | 3 | 5 | 51 | 28 | +23 | 51 | Qualification for the Championship play-offs |
| 2 | Perth Glory (C) | 24 | 16 | 2 | 6 | 48 | 22 | +26 | 50 | Qualification for the Championship play-offs |
| 3 | Parramatta Power | 24 | 12 | 4 | 8 | 51 | 27 | +24 | 40 | Qualification for the Championship play-offs |
| 4 | Newcastle United | 24 | 10 | 7 | 7 | 37 | 25 | +12 | 37 | Qualification for the Championship play-offs |
| 5 | Adelaide Force | 24 | 11 | 4 | 9 | 40 | 34 | +6 | 37 | Qualification for the Championship play-offs |
| 6 | Northern Spirit | 24 | 11 | 3 | 10 | 37 | 44 | −7 | 36 | Qualification for the Championship play-offs |
| 7 | South Melbourne | 24 | 10 | 5 | 9 | 36 | 37 | −1 | 35 | |
| 8 | Sydney United | 24 | 7 | 6 | 11 | 23 | 31 | −8 | 27 | |
| 9 | Melbourne Knights | 24 | 7 | 6 | 11 | 38 | 52 | −14 | 27 | |
| 10 | Brisbane Strikers | 24 | 7 | 5 | 12 | 38 | 45 | −7 | 26 | |
| 11 | Football Kingz | 24 | 6 | 6 | 12 | 26 | 45 | −19 | 24 | |
| 12 | Marconi Fairfield | 24 | 6 | 5 | 13 | 25 | 42 | −17 | 23 | |
| 13 | Wollongong Wolves | 24 | 5 | 8 | 11 | 25 | 43 | −18 | 23 | |

Source: rsssf.com
Rules for classification: 1) Points; 2) Goal difference; 3) Goals scored
(C) Champions

=== Home and Away Results ===
==== Round 1 ====
20 September 2002

| Marconi Fairfield | 2–2 | Wollongong Wolves |
|---|---|---|
| Brosque 7', 75' | Report | Sekulovski 44', 53' |

Marconi Stadium, Bossley Park
Attendance: 3,972
Referee: Ben Williams

20 September 2002

| Newcastle United | 2–0 | South Melbourne |
|---|---|---|
| A Griffiths 43'; Baillie 47' |

Energy Australia Stadium, Newcastle
Attendance: 7,853
Referee: Con Diomis

21 September 2002

| Brisbane Strikers | 1–2 | Northern Spirit |
|---|---|---|
| Grierson 42' | Report | Tomasevic 20'; Hutchinson 57' |

Ballymore Stadium, Brisbane
Attendance: 2,103
Referee: Peter Green

21 September 2002

| Parramatta Power | 3–0* | Perth Glory |
|---|---|---|
| | | Horsley 59'; Despotovski 64' |

Parramatta Stadium, Parramatta
Attendance: 4,155
Referee: Simon Micallef
- This match was awarded to Parramatta 3-0 after it was found that Perth Glory breached regulation 16.13 in playing an unregistered player - Andre Gumprecht. The determination was made on 4 February 2003.

22 September 2002

| Football Kingz | 0–0 | Sydney United |

Ericsson Stadium, Auckland
Attendance: 2,999
Referee: Derek Rugg

22 September 2002

| Melbourne Knights | 1-1 | Olympic Sharks |
|---|---|---|
| Pelikan 36' | Report | Milicic 47' |

Knights Stadium, Melbourne
Attendance: 4,462
Referee: Matthew Breeze

==== Round 2 ====
27 September 2002

| Northern Spirit | 1-4 | Football Kingz |
|---|---|---|
| Tomasevic 90' (pen.) | Report | Ngata 3', 18', 83' (pen.), 87' |

North Sydney Oval, Sydney
Attendance: 3,289
Referee: Angelo Nardi

27 September 2002

| Wollongong Wolves | 0–0 | Parramatta Power |

WIN Stadium, Wollongong
Attendance: 3,627
Referee: Mark Shield

28 September 2002

| Olympic Sharks | 3–0 | Marconi Fairfield |
|---|---|---|
| Juric 26'; Porter 50'; Ishida 62' | Report |

Toyota Park, Sydney
Attendance: 4,638
Referee: Simon Micallef

29 September 2002

| Sydney United | 2–0 | Newcastle United |
|---|---|---|
| B Santalab 49'; Menapi 74' |

Sydney United Sports Centre, Edensor Park
Attendance: 3,441
Referee: Brett Hugo

29 September 2002

| Adelaide Force | 1-1 | Melbourne Knights |
|---|---|---|
| Valkanis 90+2' | | Tunbridge 15' (o.g.) |

Hindmarsh Stadium, Adelaide
Attendance: 3,441
Referee: Craig Zetter

29 September 2002

| Perth Glory | 3-4 | Brisbane Strikers |
|---|---|---|
| Hassell 56'; Mori 75' (pen.), 85' (pen.) | | Rech 9', 78'; Grierson 21'; Roche 73' |

Perth Oval, Perth
Attendance: 10,573
Referee: Eddie Lennie

==== Round 3 ====
4 October 2002

| Marconi Fairfield | 1-2 | Adelaide Force |
|---|---|---|
| Brosque 57' | Report | Valkanis 72'; Budin 87' |

Marconi Stadium, Bossley Park
Attendance: 2,800
Referee: Mark Shield

4 October 2002

| Newcastle United | 5–0 | Northern Spirit |
|---|---|---|
| J Griffiths 23', 32', 67'; Thomas 45'; Moreira 76' |

Energy Australia Stadium, Newcastle
Attendance: 5,219
Referee: Matthew Breeze

5 October 2002

| Brisbane Strikers | 1-2 | Wollongong Wolves |
|---|---|---|
| Rech 82' | | Young 7', 16'; Babic 31' |

Ballymore Stadium, Brisbane
Attendance: 2,065
Referee: Craig Zetter

6 October 2002

| Football Kingz | 0–1 | Perth Glory |
|---|---|---|
| | | Mori 58' |

Ericsson Stadium, Auckland
Attendance: 3,282
Referee: Con Diomis

6 October 2002

| South Melbourne | 1-1 | Sydney United |
|---|---|---|
| Coveny 24' | Report | Cacic 32' |

Bob Jane Stadium, Albert Park
Attendance: 4,156
Referee: Perry Mur

7 October 2002

| Parramatta Power | 1-2 | Olympic Sharks |
|---|---|---|
| Cardozo 45' | | Juric 60'; Parisi 69' |

Parramatta Stadium, Parramatta
Attendance: 6,298
Referee: Brett Hugo

==== Round 4 ====
11 October 2002

| Wollongong Wolves | 0–0 | Football Kingz |
|---|---|---|
| | Report |

WIN Stadium, Wollongong
Attendance: 3,681
Referee: James Lewis

12 October 2002

| Northern Spirit | 3-2 | South Melbourne |
|---|---|---|
| Spencer 16'; Hutchinson 37'; Richter 88' | | Kisnorbo 62'; Buljan 85' |

Brookvale Oval, Brookvale
Attendance: 2,823
Referee: Simon Micallef

12 October 2002

| Olympic Sharks | 2–0 | Brisbane Strikers |
|---|---|---|
| Packer 52'; Parisi 90+2' |

Toyota Park, Sydney
Attendance: 4,439
Referee: Derek Rugg

13 October 2002

| Adelaide Force | 2–2 | Parramatta Power |
|---|---|---|
| Pantelis 34'; Vidmar 52' | | Thompson 60'; Elrich 74' |

Hindmarsh Stadium, Adelaide
Attendance: 2,454
Referee: Eddie Lennie

13 October 2002

| Perth Glory | 1–0 | Newcastle United |
|---|---|---|
| Mori 26' |

Perth Oval, Perth
Attendance: 10,448
Referee: Angelo Nardi

13 October 2002

| Melbourne Knights | 1–0 | Marconi Fairfield |
|---|---|---|
| Vasilevski 78' | Report |

Knights Stadium, Melbourne
Attendance: 3,287
Referee: Perry Mur

==== Round 5 ====
18 October 2002

| Newcastle United | 2–0 | Wollongong Wolves |
|---|---|---|
| J Griffiths 71' (pen.); Dodd 87' |

Energy Australia Stadium, Newcastle
Referee: Brett Hugo

19 October 2002

| Parramatta Power | 2–2 | Melbourne Knights |
|---|---|---|
| Piorkowski 38' (o.g.); Brown 75' | | Lapansky 68'; R Vargas 90+3' |

Parramatta Stadium, Parramatta
Attendance: 2,450
Referee: Peter Green

19 October 2002

| Brisbane Strikers | 2-3 | Adelaide Force |
|---|---|---|
| Rech 18'; Grierson 23' | Report | Pelosi 66', 77'; Vidmar 79' |

Ballymore Stadium, Brisbane
Attendance: 1,840
Referee: Derek Rugg

20 October 2002

| Football Kingz | 2-2 | Olympic Sharks |
|---|---|---|
| Almendra 52', 81' (pen.) | | Packer 51'; Harris 54' |

Ericsson Stadium, Auckland
Attendance: 2,804
Referee: Ben Williams

20 October 2002

| South Melbourne | 2–0 | Perth Glory |
|---|---|---|
| Buljan 61'; Baird 6' |

Bob Jane Stadium, Albert Park
Attendance: 6,194
Referee: Perry Mur

20 October 2002

| Sydney United | 1-1 | Northern Spirit |
|---|---|---|
| Menapi 38' | | McDermott 43' |

Sydney United Sports Centre, Edensor Park
Attendance: 5,352
Referee: Con Diomis

==== Round 6 ====
25 October 2002

| Marconi Fairfield | 0–2 | Parramatta Power |
|---|---|---|
| | | Renaud 28'; Salapasidis 54' |

Marconi Stadium, Bossley Park
Attendance: 2,750
Referee: Angelo Nardi

26 October 2002

| Olympic Sharks | 1–0 | Newcastle United |
|---|---|---|
| Porter 39' |

Toyota Park, Sydney
Attendance: 2,513
Referee: Eddie Lennie

26 October 2002

| Wollongong Wolves | 0–0 | South Melbourne |

Wade Park, Orange
Attendance: 3,286
Referee: James Lewis

27 October 2002

| Adelaide Force | 2-1 | Football Kingz |
|---|---|---|
| Vidmar 43'; Tunbridge 52' | | Almendra 40' (pen.) |

Hindmarsh Stadium, Adelaide
Attendance: 2,996
Referee: Craig Zetter

27 October 2002

| Perth Glory | 2–0 | Sydney United |
|---|---|---|
| Mori 9', 74' (pen.) |

Perth Oval, Perth
Attendance: 7,595
Referee: Mark Shield

27 October 2002

| Melbourne Knights | 3-3 | Brisbane Strikers |
|---|---|---|
| Pelikan 8'; Fa’Arodo 39', 50' | Report | Rech 21', 90+4' (pen.); Pilic 52' |

Knights Stadium, Melbourne
Attendance: 3,873
Referee: Ben Williams

==== Round 7 ====
1 November 2002

| Football Kingz | 2-2 | Melbourne Knights |
|---|---|---|
| deGregorio 47'; Almendra 51' (pen.) | | Sabljak 69'; Pelikan 81' |

Waikato Stadium, Hamilton
Attendance: 3,682
Referee: Peter Green

1 November 2002

| Newcastle United | 2-1 | Adelaide Force |
|---|---|---|
| J Griffiths 53' (pen.); Masi 90+1' | | Tunbridge 35' |

Energy Australia Stadium, Newcastle
Attendance: 7,099
Referee: Eddie Lennie

1 November 2002

| Northern Spirit | 1-3 | Perth Glory |
|---|---|---|
| Fisher 55' | | Hassell 26'; Miller 62'; Mori 90+1' |

North Sydney Oval, Sydney, New South Wales
Attendance: 2,918
Referee: Craig Zetter

2 November 2002

| Brisbane Strikers | 1-4 | Marconi Fairfield |
|---|---|---|
| Trajanovski 57' (pen.) | Report | Spiteri 11', 84'; Perinich 51'; Sekulic 65' |

Ballymore Stadium, Brisbane
Attendance: 2,061
Referee: Matthew Breeze

3 November 2002

| South Melbourne | 6–4 | Olympic Sharks |
|---|---|---|
| Baird 2', 40'; Buljan 8'; Coveny 13', 89' (pen.); Panopoulos 20' | Report | Packer 22'; Milicic 44'; Halpin 60'; Pondeljak 85' |

Bob Jane Stadium, Albert Park
Attendance: 6,027
Referee: Mark Shield

3 November 2002

| Sydney United | 2-1 | Wollongong Wolves |
|---|---|---|
| Angelucci 71'; Cacic 81' | | Young 53' |

Sydney United Sports Centre, Edensor Park
Attendance: 4,152
Referee: Simon Przydacz

==== Round 8 ====
8 November 2002

| Marconi Fairfield | 2-1 | Football Kingz |
|---|---|---|
| Spiteri 40', 56' | | Ngata 69' |

Marconi Stadium, Bossley Park
Attendance: 3,040
Referee: Brett Hugo

9 November 2002

| Parramatta Power | 2–0 | Brisbane Strikers |
|---|---|---|
| Cardozo 16' (pen.); Brownlie 78' |

Parramatta Stadium, Parramatta
Attendance: 2,148
Referee: Con Diomis

10 November 2002

| Adelaide Force | 4–0 | South Melbourne |
|---|---|---|
| Tunbridge 18'; Durakovic 19' (o.g.); Smeltz 62'; Pelosi 81' (pen.) |

Hindmarsh Stadium, Adelaide
Attendance: 3,308
Referee: Eddie Lennie

10 November 2002

| Olympic Sharks | 1–0 | Sydney United |
|---|---|---|
| Packer 90+2' |

Toyota Park, Sydney
Attendance: 3,620
Referee: Derek Rugg

10 November 2002

| Melbourne Knights | 2–0 | Newcastle United |
|---|---|---|
| Pelikan 3'; Buhic 44' | Report |

Knights Stadium, Melbourne
Attendance: 3,955
Referee: Mark Shield

10 November 2002

| Wollongong Wolves | 2-1 | Northern Spirit |
|---|---|---|
| Babic 35'; Young 62' | | Hutchinson 55' |

WIN Stadium, Wollongong
Attendance: 2,925
Referee: Simon Micallef

==== Round 9 ====
15 November 2002

| Football Kingz | 2-1 | Parramatta Power |
|---|---|---|
| Renaud 62' (o.g.); Urlovic 81' | | Salaoasidis 4' |

Ericsson Stadium, Auckland
Attendance: 2,908
Referee: Derek Rugg

15 November 2002

| Newcastle United | 0–0 | Marconi Fairfield |

Energy Australia Stadium, Newcastle
Attendance: 6,132
Referee: Con Diomis

15 November 2002

| Northern Spirit | 2-3 | Olympic Sharks |
|---|---|---|
| Tomasevic 77', 90+2' | | Watts 2' (o.g.); Porter 17'; Pondeljak 68' |

North Sydney Oval, Sydney
Attendance: 2,795
Referee: Matthew Breeze

17 November 2002

| Perth Glory | 3-1 | Wollongong Wolves |
|---|---|---|
| Hassell 14', 43'; Mrdja 23' | | Young 37' (pen.) |

Perth Oval, Perth
Attendance: 12,801
Referee: Peter Green

17 November 2002

| South Melbourne | 4-2 | Melbourne Knights |
|---|---|---|
| Trimboli 1' (pen.); Buljan 31'; Damianos 61'; Tolios 67' | Report | Buhic 30'; Pelikan 43' (pen.) |

Bob Jane Stadium, Albert Park
Attendance: 8,997
Referee: Brett Hugo

17 November 2002

| Sydney United | 2-1 | Adelaide Force |
|---|---|---|
| Angelucci 45', 87' | | Vidmar 84' |

Sydney United Sports Centre, Edensor Park
Attendance: 3,963
Referee: Mark Shield

==== Round 10 ====
23 November 2002

| Brisbane Strikers | 0–2 | Football Kingz |
|---|---|---|
| | Report | Ngata 25'; Almendra 81' |

Ballymore Stadium, Brisbane
Attendance: 1,695
Referee: Angelo Nardi

24 November 2002

| Melbourne Knights | 3-2 | Sydney United |
|---|---|---|
| Pelikan 28' (pen.); Biscayzacu 58' (pen.); Cervinski 78' | | Santalab 3', 55' |

Knights Stadium, Melbourne
Attendance: 4,155
Referee: Craig Zetter

24 November 2002

| Olympic Sharks | 2-1 | Perth Glory |
|---|---|---|
| Milicic 60'; Harris 86' | Report | Hassell 65' |

Toyota Park, Sydney
Attendance: 5,020
Referee: Mark Shield

24 November 2002

| Parramatta Power | 1-4 | Newcastle United |
|---|---|---|
| Buonavoglia 88' | | J Griffiths 7', 18'; Dodd 24', 74' |

Parramatta Stadium, Parramatta
Attendance: 2,755
Referee: Eddie Lennie

24 November 2002

| South Melbourne | 1–0 | Marconi Fairfield |
|---|---|---|
| Damianos 36' | Report 1 Report 2 |

Bob Jane Stadium, Albert Park
Attendance: 4,972
Referee: Simon Micallef

24 November 2002

| Adelaide Force | 1-1 | Northern Spirit |
|---|---|---|
| Valkanis 83' | | Hutchinson 89' |

Hindmarsh Stadium, Adelaide
Attendance: 1,897
Referee: Con Diomis

==== Round 11 ====
29 November 2002

| Northern Spirit | 2-1 | Melbourne Knights |
|---|---|---|
| Kwasnik 18'; Richter 65' | | Biscayzacu 87' |

North Sydney Oval, Sydney, New South Wales
Attendance: 1,004
Referee: Brett Hugo

29 November 2002

| Newcastle United | 3-3 | Brisbane Strikers |
|---|---|---|
| Masi 12'; Tsekenis 39'; J Griffiths 81' | | Roche 55', 79'; Drake 59' |

Energy Australia Stadium, Newcastle
Attendance: 2,003
Referee: Craig Zetter

1 December 2002

| Perth Glory | 1–0 | Adelaide Force |
|---|---|---|
| Mrdja 84' |

Perth Oval, Perth
Attendance: 9,687
Referee: Con Diomis

1 December 2002

| South Melbourne | 1–0 | Parramatta Power |
|---|---|---|
| Coveny 85' | Report |

Bob Jane Stadium, Albert Park
Attendance: 4,250
Referee: Matthew Breeze

1 December 2002

| Olympic Sharks | 3–0 | Wollongong Wolves |
|---|---|---|
| Milicic 39'; Durante 52'; Porter 90+2' |

Toyota Park, Sydney
Attendance: 3,920
Referee: Perry Mur

1 December 2002

| Sydney United | 2–0 | Marconi Fairfield |
|---|---|---|
| Santalab 34' (pen.); Deur 64' | Report |

Sydney United Sports Centre, Edensor Park
Attendance: 3,826
Referee: Eddie Lennie

==== Round 12 ====
6 December 2002

| Football Kingz | 2–0 | Newcastle United |
|---|---|---|
| Urlovic 9'; Almendra 65' | Report |

Ericsson Stadium, Auckland
Attendance: 2,753
Referee: Perry Mur

7 December 2002

| Brisbane Strikers | 2–1 | South Melbourne |
|---|---|---|
| Trajanovski 12'; McLaren 80' | Report | Coveny 52' |

Ballymore Stadium, Brisbane
Attendance: 1,721
Referee: Mark Shield

20 January 2003

| Marconi Fairfield | 0–1 | Northern Spirit |
|---|---|---|
| | Report | Tomasevic 61' (pen.) |

Marconi Stadium, Bossley Park
Attendance: 2,199
Referee: Senko Rastocic

8 December 2002

| Melbourne Knights | 1-4 | Perth Glory |
|---|---|---|
| Pelikan 18' (pen.) | Report | Mrdja 25'; Mori 33', 80'; Hassell 45' |

Knights Stadium, Melbourne
Attendance: 4,770
Referee: Matthew Breeze

8 December 2002

| Parramatta Power | 3–0 | Sydney United |
|---|---|---|
| Salapasidis 44'; Maloney 45'; Elrich 75' |

Parramatta Stadium, Parramatta
Attendance: 3,004
Referee: Ben Williams

8 December 2002

| Wollongong Wolves | 1–0 | Adelaide Force |
|---|---|---|
| Sekulovski 9' |

WIN Stadium, Wollongong
Attendance: 2,683
Referee: Angelo Nardi

==== Round 13 ====
4 February 2003

| Northern Spirit | 2 - 1 | Parramatta Power |

15 December 2002

| Adelaide Force | 1 - 3 | Olympic Sharks |

15 December 2002

| Perth Glory | 3 - 0 | Marconi Fairfield |

15 December 2002

| South Melbourne | 3 - 0 | Football Kingz |

15 December 2002

| Melbourne Knights | 1 - 4 | Wollongong Wolves |

15 December 2002

| Sydney United | 0 - 3 | Brisbane Strikers |

==== Round 14 ====
20 December 2002

| Marconi Fairfield | 0 - 3 | Olympic Sharks |

20 December 2002

| Newcastle United | 4 - 1 | Sydney United |

21 December 2002

| Brisbane Strikers | 1 - 1 | Perth Glory |

22 December 2002

| Melbourne Knights | 4 - 3 | Adelaide Force |

22 December 2002

| Parramatta Power | 1 - 0 | Wollongong Wolves |

27 February 2003

| Football Kingz | 1 - 3 | Northern Spirit |

==== Round 15 ====
27 December 2002

| Northern Spirit | 2 - 3 | Brisbane Strikers |

27 December 2002

| Wollongong Wolves | 2 - 4 | Marconi Fairfield |

29 December 2002

| Perth Glory | 2 - 1 | Parramatta Power |

29 December 2002

| South Melbourne | 1 - 1 | Newcastle United |

29 December 2002

| Olympic Sharks | 3 - 1 | Melbourne Knights |

29 December 2002

| Sydney United | 1 - 0 | Football Kingz |

==== Round 16 ====
3 March 2003

| Adelaide Force | 3 - 0 | Marconi Fairfield |

3 January 2003

| Wollongong Wolves | 1 - 1 | Brisbane Strikers |

4 January 2003

| Perth Glory | 5 - 0 | Football Kingz |

5 January 2003

| Northern Spirit | 0 - 0 | Northern Spirit |

5 January 2003

| Olympic Sharks | 1 - 2 | Parramatta Power |

5 January 2003

| Sydney United | 0 - 1 | South Melbourne |

==== Round 17 ====
10 January 2003

| Football Kingz | 1 - 1 | Wollongong Wolves |

10 January 2003

| Marconi Fairfield | 4 - 1 | Melbourne Knights |

10 January 2003

| Newcastle United | 0 - 1 | Perth Glory |

11 January 2003

| Brisbane Strikers | 3 - 0 | Olympic Sharks |

11 January 2003

| Parramatta Power | 1 - 1 | Adelaide Force |

12 January 2003

| South Melbourne | 1 - 0 | Northern Spirit |

==== Round 18 ====
17 January 2003

| Adelaide Force | 1 - 0 | Brisbane Strikers |

17 January 2003

| Northern Spirit | 1 - 0 | Sydney United |

18 January 2003

| Perth Glory | 2 - 0 | South Melbourne |

18 January 2003

| Olympic Sharks | 1 - 0 | Football Kingz |

19 January 2003

| Melbourne Knights | 0 - 4 | Parramatta Power |

8 January 2003

| Wollongong Wolves | 2 - 2 | Newcastle United |

==== Round 19 ====
24 January 2003

| Newcastle United | 2 - 1 | Olympic Sharks |

25 January 2003

| Brisbane Strikers | 1 - 5 | Melbourne Knights |

25 January 2003

| Football Kingz | 0 - 3 | Adelaide Force |

26 January 2003

| Parramatta Power | 7 - 0 | Marconi Fairfield |

26 January 2003

| Sydney United | 1 - 1 | Perth Glory |

26 January 2003

| South Melbourne | 0 - 0 | Wollongong Wolves |

==== Round 20 ====
31 March 2003

| Adelaide Force | 2 - 3 | Newcastle United |

31 January 2003

| Marconi Fairfield | 2 - 1 | Brisbane Strikers |

31 January 2003

| Wollongong Wolves | 2 - 1 | Sydney United |

1 February 2003

| Perth Glory | 3 - 0 | Northern Spirit |

2 February 2003

| Melbourne Knights | 1 - 2 | Football Kingz |

2 February 2003

| Olympic Sharks | 3 - 2 | South Melbourne |

==== Round 21 ====
7 February 2003

| Football Kingz | 0 - 0 | Marconi Fairfield |

7 February 2003

| Newcastle United | 1 - 1 | Melbourne Knights |

9 February 2003

| Northern Spirit | 3 - 0 | Wollongong Wolves |

9 February 2003

| Sydney United | 1 - 1 | Olympic Sharks |

9 February 2003

| Brisbane Strikers | 3 - 0 | Parramatta Power |

9 February 2003

| South Melbourne | 1 - 2 | Adelaide Force |

==== Round 22 ====
14 February 2003

| Adelaide Force | 2 - 0 | Sydney United |

14 February 2003

| Marconi Fairfield | 0 - 1 | Newcastle United |

15 February 2003

| Parramatta Power | 7 - 0 | Football Kingz |

16 February 2003

| Melbourne Knights | 1 - 0 | South Melbourne |

16 February 2003

| Olympic Sharks | 2 - 3 | Northern Spirit |

16 February 2003

| Wollongong Wolves | 1 - 6 | Perth Glory |

==== Round 23 ====
21 February 2003

| Marconi Fairfield | 2 - 2 | South Melbourne |

21 February 2003

| Newcastle United | 3 - 0 | Parramatta Power |

21 February 2003

| Northern Spirit | 2 - 3 | Adelaide Force |

22 February 2003

| Perth Glory | 0 - 1 | Olympic Sharks |

23 February 2003

| Football Kingz | 0 - 3 | Brisbane Strikers |

23 February 2003

| Sydney United | 2 - 0 | Melbourne Knights |

==== Round 24 ====
28 February 2003

| Adelaide Force | 0 - 2 | Perth Glory |

28 February 2003

| Marconi Fairfield | 1 - 1 | Sydney United |

28 February 2003

| Wollongong Wolves | 0 - 5 | Olympic Sharks |

1 March 2003

| Brisbane Strikers | 1 - 1 | Newcastle United |

1 March 2003

| Parramatta Power | 4 - 1 | SouM |

1 March 2003

| Melbourne Knights | 1 - 3 | Northern Spirit |

==== Round 25 ====
12 February 2003

| South Melbourne | 1 - 0 | Brisbane Strikers |

7 March 2003

| Newcastle United | 1 - 2 | Football Kingz |

7 March 2003

| Northern Spirit | 2 - 1 | Marconi Fairfield |

7 March 2003

| Adelaide Force | 2 - 1 | Wollongong Wolves |

8 March 2003

| Perth Glory | 3 - 1 | Melbourne Knights |

9 March 2003

| Sydney United | 0 - 1 | Parramatta Power |

==== Round 26 ====
14 March 2003

| Wollongong Wolves | 1 - 2 | Melbourne Knights |

14 March 2003

| Olympic Sharks | 3 - 0 | Adelaide Force |

15 March 2003

| Brisbane Strikers | 1 - 3 | Sydney United |

16 March 2003

| Football Kingz | 4 - 5 | South Melbourne |

16 March 2003

| Marconi Fairfield | 2 - 0 | Perth Glory |

16 March 2003

| Parramatta Power | 5 - 1 | Northern Spirit |

== Championship play-offs ==
| Pos | Team | Pld | W | D | L | GF | GA | GD | Pts | Qualification |
|---|---|---|---|---|---|---|---|---|---|---|
| 1 | Perth Glory (C) | 10 | 8 | 0 | 2 | 27 | 7 | +20 | 27 (Note: Awarded 3 bonus points, due to regular season position.) | Qualification for the Grand Final |
| 2 | Olympic Sharks | 10 | 4 | 1 | 5 | 17 | 14 | +3 | 19 (Note: Awarded 6 bonus points, due to regular season position.) | Qualification for the Grand Final |
| 3 | Adelaide Force (R) | 10 | 5 | 2 | 3 | 19 | 14 | +5 | 17 | Joined the SASF Premier League (Note: Adelaide Force was not forcibly relegated, but voluntarily left the league due to financial difficulties.) |
| 4 | Parramatta Power | 10 | 3 | 4 | 3 | 16 | 21 | −5 | 13 | |
| 5 | Northern Spirit | 9 | 2 | 2 | 5 | 7 | 22 | −15 | 8 (Note: The Round 9 match between Northern Spirit and Newcastle United was not played, as neither team could progress.) | |
| 6 | Newcastle United | 9 | 2 | 1 | 6 | 9 | 17 | −8 | 7 | |

Source: rsssf.com
Rules for classification: 1) Points; 2) Goal difference; 3) Goals scored
(C) Champions; (R) Relegated

=== Championship Playoff Results ===
==== Playoff Round 1 ====
21 March 2003

| Adelaide Force | 1 - 0 | Olympic Sharks |

22 March 2003

| Perth Glory | 5 - 0 | Northern Spirit |

23 March 2003

| Newcastle United | 1 - 2 | Parramatta Power |

==== Playoff Round 2 ====
28 March 2003

| Adelaide Force | 3 - 2 | Newcastle United |

30 March 2003

| Parramatta Power | 2 - 1 | Perth Glory |

30 March 2003

| Olympic Sharks | 1 - 3 | Northern Spirit |

==== Playoff Round 3 ====
4 April 2003

| Newcastle United | 1 - 3 | Olympic Sharks |

5 April 2003

| Perth Glory | 3 - 1 | Adelaide Force |

5 April 2003

| Northern Spirit | 1 - 0 | Parramatta Power |

==== Playoff Round 4 ====
11 April 2003

| Adelaide Force | 2 - 2 | Parramatta Power |

13 April 2003

| Newcastle United | 0 - 0 | Northern Spirit |

13 April 2003

| Olympic Sharks | 1 - 2 | Perth Glory |

==== Playoff Round 5 ====
18 April 2003

| Northern Spirit | 1 - 2 | Adelaide Force |

19 April 2003

| Perth Glory | 4 - 0 | Newcastle United |

20 April 2003

| Parramatta Power | 2 - 2 | Olympic Sharks |

==== Playoff Round 6 ====
25 April 2003

| Northern Spirit | 0 - 3 | Perth Glory |

27 April 2003

| Parramatta Power | v | Newcastle United |

27 April 2003

| Olympic Sharks | v | Adelaide Force |

==== Playoff Round 7 ====
2 May 2003

| Newcastle United | 0 - 1 | Adelaide Force |

3 May 2003

| Perth Glory | 6 - 1 | Parramatta Power |

4 May 2003

| Northern Spirit | 0 - 3 | Olympic Sharks |

==== Playoff Round 8 ====
9 May 2003

| Adelaide Force | 1 - 2 | Perth Glory |

11 May 2003

| Parramatta Power | 2 - 2 | Northern Spirit |

12 May 2003

| Olympic Sharks | 1 - 2 | Newcastle United |

==== Playoff Round 9 ====
16 May 2003

| Northern Spirit | P - P | Newcastle United |

- This match was initially postponed due to heavy rains in Sydney making the pitch unplayable. It was intended to be rescheduled for Rat Park. Neither side could affect the championship, so the match was not played.

17 May 2003

| Perth Glory | 1 - 0 | Olympic Sharks |

18 May 2003

| Parramatta Power | 1 - 1 | Adelaide Force |

==== Playoff Round 10 ====
23 May 2003

| Newcastle United | 1 - 0 | Perth Glory |

25 May 2003

| Adelaide Force | 6 - 0 | Northern Spirit |

25 May 2003

| Olympic Sharks | 3 - 1 | Parramatta Power |

== Grand final ==
1 June 2003
13:00 AWST

| Perth Glory | 2 – 0 | Olympic Sharks |
|---|---|---|
| Harnwell 29'; Mori 87' | (Report) |

Subiaco Oval, Perth
Attendance: 38,111
Referee: Mark Shield

PERTH GLORY:
| GK | 1 | (Australia) Jason Petkovic |
| MF | 2 | (Australia) Matt Horsley |
| DF | 3 | (Australia) Jamie Harnwell |
| MF | 4 | (Australia) Bradley Hassell | | (substituted off) 60' |
| MF | 6 | (Germany) Andre Gumprecht |
| MF | 7 | (Australia) Scott Miller |
| FW | 10 | (Australia) Bobby Despotovski (c) | | (substituted off) 87' |
| FW | 16 | (Australia) Damian Mori | | (substituted off) 89' |
| DF | 18 | (Australia) Shane Pryce |
| DF | 22 | (Australia) Simon Colosimo |
| DF | 23 | (Australia) David Tarka | (yellow card) 40' |
Substitutes:
| GK | 20 | (Australia) Vince Matassa |
| FW | 9 | (Australia) Nik Mrdja | | (substituted on) 89' |
| DF | 12 | (Australia) Mark Byrnes | | (substituted on) 60' |
| MF | 15 | (Brazil) Edgar Aldrighi | | (substituted on) 87' |
| FW | 21 | (Australia) Adrian Caceres |
Manager:
(South Africa) Mich d'Avray
Joe Marston Medal:
(Australia) Simon Colosimo

OLYMPIC SHARKS:
| GK | 1 | (Australia) Clint Bolton |
| DF | 4 | (Australia) Paul Kohler | | | (substituted off) 80' |
| DF | 6 | (Australia) Ante Juric (c) |
| MF | 8 | (Australia) Tom Pondeljak |
| FW | 9 | (Australia) Ante Milicic |
| MF | 10 | (Australia) Troy Halpin |
| MF | 11 | (Australia) Jade North |
| FW | 17 | (Australia) Jeromy Harris | | | (substituted off) 76' |
| FW | 18 | (Australia) Joel Porter | (yellow card) 58' | | (substituted off) 80' |
| DF | 23 | (Australia) Andrew Packer |
| MF | 27 | (Japan) Hiroyuki Ishida |
Substitutes:
| GK | 20 | (Australia) Brett Hughes |
| MF | 7 | (Australia) Wayne Srhoj | | | (substituted on) 80' |
| FW | 12 | (Australia) Franco Parisi | | | (substituted on) 80' |
| MF | 14 | (Australia) Greg Owens | | (substituted on) 76' |
| DF | 24 | (Australia) Andrew Durante |
Manager:
(Australia) Lee Sterrey
