= Van Steeden =

Van Steeden is a surname. Notable people with the surname include:

- Peter van Steeden (1904–1990), American composer
- Riki van Steeden (born 1976), New Zealand soccer player
