= Bill Damianos =

Australian football player

Personal information
- Full name: Vasilios Damianos
- Date of birth: 18 April 1977 (age 49)
- Place of birth: Australia
- Position: Central midfielder

Senior career*
Years	Team	Apps	(Gls)
1994–1998	South Melbourne	89	(10)
1998–2004	Skoda Xanthi	39	(2)
2001	→ Kallithea (loan)	4	(0)
2002–2003	→ South Melbourne (loan)	19	(3)
2004–2005	Heidelberg United	51	(11)
2006–2011	Oakleigh Cannons	119	(17)
2012–2014	South Springvale	54	(8)
Medal record
Representing Australia
Men's Association football
OFC U-20 Championship
Winner	1997 Tahiti
- * Club domestic league appearances and goals as of 01:40, 1 May 2025 (UTC)

Bill Damianos (born 18 April 1977) is an Australian soccer player who played most notably in the National Soccer League (NSL) for South Melbourne and in the Super League Greece for Skoda Xanthi

== Club career ==
Damianos made his debut for South Melbourne in 1994 as a 17-year-old.

Damianos played for Skoda Xanthi in the Super League Greece, appearing in 24 league matches during the 1998–99 season., 9 matches during the 1999–00 season and 6 matches during the 2000–01 season.

In 2002, Damianos returned to South Melbourne on loan from Xanthi. He played 19 times for South in the 2002–03 National Soccer League season. Ahead of the 2003–04 NSL season, South Melbourne tried unsuccessfully to arrange a permanent transfer for Damianos from Xanthi.

Damianos transferred from Xanthi to Heidelberg United in 2004.

== Honours ==
Australia U-20

- OFC U-19 Men's Championship: 1997
