= Mark Elrick =

New Zealand footballer

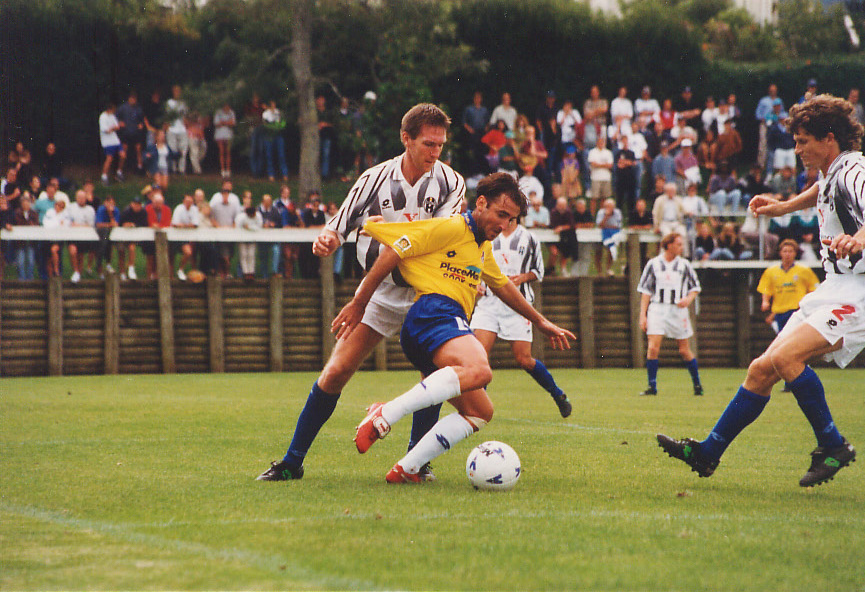

Personal information
- Full name: Mark Elrick
- Date of birth: 7 April 1967 (age 59)
- Place of birth: Auckland, New Zealand
- Height: 1.68 m (5 ft 6 in)
- Position: Striker

Senior career*
Years	Team	Apps	(Gls)
1992–1995	North Shore United		
1996	Waitakere City F.C.		
1996–1999	Central United		
1999–2000	Football Kingz	6	(1)
2000–2001	Central United		
2001–2002	Onehunga Sports		
2006–2007	Hawke's Bay United	4	(1)

International career
1995–2000	New Zealand	30	(3)
- * Club domestic league appearances and goals

Mark Elrick (born 7 April 1967 in Auckland) is a former New Zealand soccer player who played as a striker.

He has played for several teams in his native country and came out of retirement in November 2006 to join struggling Hawke's Bay. He had been player-coach at Onehunga Sports in Auckland for the last two years. A spectator at Hawke's Bay's 2–1 loss to Waitakere United Elrick approached Jonathan Gould after the match and asked if the Park Island club would be interested in his services. An agreement was immediately reached on the spot. Also, he works occasionally as a football commentator for SKY TV.

Elrick scored a hat-trick in the final of the 1999 New Zealand National Soccer League, a match which Central United won 3–1 over Dunedin Technical.

He has played 40 times for the New Zealand national soccer team, the All Whites, including 30 A-internationals in which he scored 3 goals.
