= George Goutzioulis =

Australian soccer player

Personal information
- Date of birth: 18 January 1978 (age 48)
- Place of birth: Australia
- Position: Midfielder

Youth career
- South Melbourne FC

Senior career*
Years	Team	Apps	(Gls)
199x–2000	South Melbourne FC		
2000–2001	Sydney Olympic FC		
2001–2002	Football Kingz FC		
2002–2003	Tampines Rovers FC		
2003–2004	Sydney Olympic FC		
2005–2006	Oakleigh Cannons FC		
2007	Heidelberg United FC		
2008–2009	Richmond SC		
2010	Bentleigh Greens SC		
2011	Harrisfield Hurricanes		
- * Club domestic league appearances and goals

George Goutzioulis (born 18 January 1978, in Australia) is an Australian retired soccer player who is last known to have played for Harrisfield Hurricanes in his home country in 2011.

== Career ==
=== New Zealand ===
A member of Football Kingz for the 2001–02 National Soccer League, Goutzioulis made this 100th NSL appearance there, handed two red cards through his spell there. He also scored three goals, one an equalizer in a 2–3 loss to Northern Spirit which set the fans into exultation. However, he was released near the end of the season, citing 'personal reasons'.

=== Singapore ===
Boosting Tampines Rovers of the Singaporean S.League in mid-season 2002, the Australian spearheaded the Stags to their first-ever major trophy, the Singapore Cup with a late-minute header.
