= Andreas Bluhm =

German footballer

Personal information
- Date of birth: 21 December 1973 (age 52)
- Place of birth: Germany
- Position: Midfielder

Senior career*
Years	Team	Apps	(Gls)
1993–1995	Borussia Mönchengladbach	6	(0)
1995–1999	Alemannia Aachen	114	(15)
1999–2000	FC Augsburg	26	(1)
2000–2001	Football Kingz	21	(1)
Total		167	(17)
- * Club domestic league appearances and goals

Andreas Bluhm (born 21 December 1973) is a German former professional footballer who played as a midfielder.

== Career ==
Bluhm started his senior career with Borussia Mönchengladbach in 1993, where he made six appearances. After that, he played for German clubs Alemannia Aachen and Augsburg and New Zealand club Football Kingz before retiring in 2001.
