= Anthony Roche =

Australian soccer player

Personal information
- Date of birth: August 17, 1976 (age 49)
- Position: Forward

Senior career*
| Years | Team | Apps | (Gls) |
| 2002–2003 | Brisbane Strikers | 21 | (12) |
| 2003–2004 | Fortuna Düsseldorf | 12 | (0) |
| 2004–2005 | Yeovil Town | 0 | (0) |
- * Club domestic league appearances and goals

Anthony Roche (born 17 August 1976) is an Australian retired footballer.

== Early life and education ==
Anthony Roche was born on 17 August 1976 in Brisbane, Queensland. He may have French citizenship as well as Australian.

In 1994, Roche played in the Australian Schoolboys International team.

== Career ==
Roche first played for Wynnum District in Brisbane, Queensland.

He represented Queensland against New South Wales in 2000 (when he scored once) and 2002 (no goals).

In 2002 he joined Brisbane Strikers in the National Soccer League, under coach John Kosmina. He played as a forward, number 21, scoring 12 goals in 21 games.

That attracted the interest of Fortuna Düsseldorf and he signed for the then-Oberliga Nordrhein club from the Strikers for the 2004/5 season. He failed to make an impact in Germany, despite coach Massimo Morales's hopes for his "killer instinct" in front of goal.

He then joined English side and Yeovil Town in League Two from July 2004, but retired in December 2004.

== After retirement ==
After leaving Yeovil, Roche managed the Wynnum Wolves FC from January 2005 until December 2007.

In 2019, he was became senior women's coach at Sunshine Coast Wanderers
