= Claudio Pelosi =

Italian football player (born 1966)

Personal information
- Date of birth: 29 May 1966 (age 60)
- Place of birth: Cantù, Como, Italy
- Height: 1.74 m (5 ft 9 in)
- Position: Striker

Team information
- Current team: Cantù

Senior career*
Years	Team	Apps	(Gls)
1985–1988	Cremonese	63	(3)
1988–1989	Libertas	29	(1)
1989–1990	Derthona	28	(6)
1990–1993	Catania	87	(17)
1993–94	Empoli	32	(2)
1994–96	Frosinone	54	(16)
1996–97	Ternana	13	(2)
1997–98	Ascoli	22	(4)
1988–99	Pistoiese	19	(2)
1999–2001	Adelaide City	48	(21)
2001–2002	Grosseto	23	(7)
2002–2003	Adelaide City	29	(14)
2003–2004	Rovigo		
2004–2005	Lavagnese	27	(12)
2005–2008	Cantù		

Managerial career
- 2009–2010: Cantù (assistant)
- 2011: Serie D rep. side (assistant)
- 2012–: Renate (youth)
- * Club domestic league appearances and goals as of 20:48, 2 January 2007 (ACDT) ‡ National team caps and goals as of 20:48, 2 January 2007 (ACDT)

Claudio Pelosi (born 29 May 1966 in Cantù, Como) is an Italian football (soccer) player. As a young player he represented U.S. Cremonese, Lucchese and Derthona. In the 1992–93 season he played for Calcio Catania in Serie C1 before moving to Empoli and Frosinone. He then moved on to play for Ternana, Ascoli and Pistoiese. In the 2001–02 season, Pelosi played 23 matches and scored 7 goals with Grosseto before leaving Italy and heading to South Australia where he played for Adelaide City in the National Soccer League. After scoring many goals and becoming a huge hit with City's few but proud Italian fans, Pelosi returned to Italy's lower leagues, playing with Rovigo Calcio and Lavagnese before returning in 2006–07 to play for his home-town, Cantù, in the Eccellenza.

== Honours ==
Ternana

- Serie C2: 1996-97
