= Simon Eaddy =

New Zealand footballer (born 1971)

Personal information
- Date of birth: 14 September 1971 (age 55)
- Place of birth: New Plymouth, New Zealand
- Position: Goalkeeper

Senior career*
Years	Team	Apps	(Gls)
1999–2003	Football Kingz		
2001	University-Mount Wellington		
2003	Ottawa Wizards		
2004–2009	Waitakere United		
2009–2010	Auckland City		

Managerial career
- 2006–2007: New Zealand Knights FC (goalkeepers)
- 2009–2010: Auckland City (goalkeepers)
- 2005–2008: New Zealand U20 (women) (goalkeepers)
- 2007–2011: New Zealand (women) (goalkeepers)
- 2012–2019: Canada (women) (goalkeepers)
- 2018–2023: Canada (goalkeepers)
- 2023–: Toronto FC (goalkeepers)
- * Club domestic league appearances and goals

Simon Eaddy (born 14 September 1971) is a former New Zealand footballer who played as a goalkeeper and is the current goalkeeper coach with Toronto FC.

== Club career ==
=== Early career ===
Eaddy began his football career in New Plymouth, playing for Spotswood College and Moturoa AFC from 1985 to 1990.

Eaddy's professional career began in the Australian National Soccer League with Football Kingz FC in 1999 as a backup for Jason Batty. He would re-sign with the club the following season. Throughout his tenure with the Kingz FC, he was selected to the league's all-star team for the 2000, 2001, and 2002 seasons. In 2001, he returned to New Zealand to play in the 2001 Chatham Cup final with University-Mount Wellington, where he assisted the club in defeating Central United.

=== Canada ===
In the summer of 2003, he played abroad in the Canadian Professional Soccer League with the Ottawa Wizards and was also named the club's captain. He would record his first clean sheet for the club on 6 July 2003, against Laval Dynamites. Throughout his stint with Ottawa, he helped the club achieve a perfect season, which clinched the Eastern Conference title. However, the club opted out of the postseason tournament as the team's owner was embroiled in a dispute with the league's executive committee. Following a successful regular season, Eaddy was named the league's top goalkeeper.

=== New Zealand ===
In 2004, he returned to his native New Zealand to play in the country's top league with Waitakere United. The club would finish second in the division, and Eaddy was named as the club's player's player. He re-signed with Waitakere the following season. In his debut season with Waitakere, he would appear in the 2007 OFC Champions League. Waitakere would win the continental tournament after defeating Fijian side Ba F.C. He would compete once again in the champions league with Waitakere during the 2007-08 edition.

In 2009, league rivals Auckland City qualified for the 2009 FIFA Club World Cup, and in preparation for the tournament, he was signed by the club.

== International career ==
In 2006, he was called to the New Zealand men's national football team camp held by head coach Ricki Herbert.

== Managerial career ==
He began to transition into the coaching realm in 2009 as the goalkeeping coach for Auckland City. Eaddy would expand his coaching portfolio in 2010 by becoming involved with the New Zealand national team program in the same role.

Eaddy once more joined John Herdman's coaching staff in 2018 as the goalkeeper coach for the Canada men's national soccer team. He would help the national team qualify for the 2022 FIFA World Cup. In 2023, he joined the coaching staff of Toronto FC in Major League Soccer, along with head coach John Herdman, as the club's goalkeeper coach.

== Honors ==
=== Player ===
Ottawa Wizards

- Canadian Professional Soccer League Eastern Conference: 2003
- Canadian Professional Soccer League Goalkeeper of the Year: 2003

University-Mount Wellington

- Chatham Cup: 2001

Waitakere United

- OFC Champions League: 2007, 2007–08
- New Zealand Football Championship: 2007–08
