= Gerard Davis =

New Zealand footballer

Personal information
- Full name: Gerard Davis
- Date of birth: 25 September 1977 (age 49)
- Height: 1.78 m (5 ft 10 in)
- Position: Defensive midfielder

Team information
- Current team: Glenfield Rovers
- Number: 6

Youth career
- 1996–1998: Stanford Cardinal

Senior career*
Years	Team	Apps	(Gls)
2000–2002	Football Kingz	28	(0)
2002	Tampere United	8	(0)
2003–2004	Western Suburbs		
2005–2006	Waitakere United		
2006–	Glenfield Rovers		

International career^{‡}
2000–2003	New Zealand	23	(0)
- * Club domestic league appearances and goals as of 1 February 2007 ‡ National team caps and goals as of 1 February 2007

Gerard Davis (born 25 September 1977) is a former footballer who played for New Zealand club Glenfield Rovers.

The defender made his full New Zealand debut in a 3–1 win over Vanuatu on 21 June 2000, and went on to make 23 A-international appearances, his final appearance in a 0–3 loss to Iran on 12 October 2003.

Davis was included in the New Zealand 2003 Confederations Cup squad, playing in all three group games.
