= Lee Jones (footballer, born 1975) =

New Zealand footballer

Personal information
- Full name: Lee Jones
- Date of birth: 21 February 1975 (age 51)
- Place of birth: Castor Bay, New Zealand
- Height: 1.87 m (6 ft 1 1/2 in)
- Position: Defender

Senior career*
Years	Team	Apps	(Gls)
- East Coast Bays
- Glenfield Rovers
1994	North Shore United		
1997–1998	Akron University		
1998–1999	Wimbledon F.C.		
2000–2001	The Football Kingz	31	(2)
1999–2001	Tampere United	47	(0)
2002	FC Jokerit		(?)
2003	Drogheda United	?	(0)

International career^{‡}
2002	New Zealand	5	(0)
- * Club domestic league appearances and goals as of 14 February 2007 ‡ National team caps and goals as of 14 February 2007

Lee Jones (born 21 February 1975 in Castor Bay) is an association football player who has represented New Zealand at international level.

== Career ==
Jones made 5 appearances for the New Zealand national football team, the All Whites, his debut coming in a 9–1 win over Papua New Guinea on 7 July 2002.

In 1994, he won the New Zealand championship with North Shore United.
