= Patricio Almendra =

Chilean footballer and current manager (born 1977)

Personal information
- Full name: Patricio Antonio Almendra Cifuentes
- Date of birth: 3 September 1977 (age 49)
- Place of birth: Concepción, Chile
- Height: 1.74 m (5 ft 9 in)
- Position: Midfielder

Youth career
- 1993–1996: Huachipato

Senior career*
Years	Team	Apps	(Gls)
1997	Huachipato		
1998	Lower Hutt City		
1998	Fernández Vial		
1999	Universidad de Concepción		
2000–2001	Deportes Concepción		
2001	Santiago Morning		
2002–2003	Football Kingz	18	(6)
2003	Al-Ittihad		
2003	Al-Ahli		
2004–2010	Deportes Concepción	195	(30)
2006	→ Unión Española (loan)	22	(0)
2007	→ Curicó Unido (loan)	12	(0)
2012	Deportes Concepción	10	(0)

International career
2001	Chile	2	(0)
2001	Chile B	1	(0)

Managerial career
- 2011: Deportes Concepción (assistant)
- 2013–2014: Deportes Concepción
- 2014–2015: Santiago Morning
- 2017: Naval
- 2018: Iberia
- 2019–2020: Fernández Vial (assistant)
- 2021–2023: San Luis (assistant)
- 2024: Curicó Unido (assistant)
- 2024: San Luis (assistant)
- 2025: Deportes Concepción U21
- 2025: Deportes Concepción (interim)
- 2025–2026: Deportes Concepción
- * Club domestic league appearances and goals

Patricio Antonio Almendra Cifuentes (Spanish pronunciation: [paˈtɾisjo alˈmendɾa], born 3 September 1977) is a Chilean former footballer and current football manager.

== International career ==
Almendra made two appearances for the Chile national team in 2001. In addition, he made an appearance for Chile B in the friendly match against Catalonia on 28 December 2001.

== Coaching career ==
In August 2025, Almendra assumed as interim coach of Deportes Concepción after Manuel Suárez was released. Confirmed for the 2026 season, he left them on 14 March 2026.

== Personal life ==
He is the older brother of the former footballer and futsal player Jonatan Almendra.

== Honours ==
=== Player ===
Al-Ahli

- President Cup (1): 2003–04
