= Ivan Vicelich =

New Zealand footballer (born 1976)

Ivan Vicelich MNZM
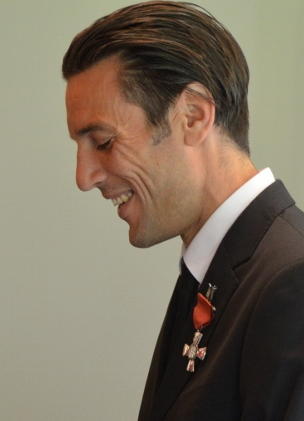
- Vicelich in 2015

Personal information
- Full name: Ivan Robert Vicelich
- Date of birth: 3 September 1976 (age 50)
- Place of birth: Auckland, New Zealand
- Height: 1.93 m (6 ft 4 in)
- Positions: Centre-back; defensive midfielder

Senior career*
Years	Team	Apps	(Gls)
1993–1995	Waitakere City		
1996–1999	Central United	100	(18)
1999–2001	Football Kingz	46	(6)
2001–2006	Roda JC	129	(14)
2006–2008	RKC Waalwijk	21	(0)
2008–2016	Auckland City	82	(8)
2010	→ Shenzhen Ruby (loan)	14	(0)
2010–2016	Central United	51	
Total		443	(46)

International career^{‡}
- New Zealand U17
- New Zealand U20
- New Zealand U23
1995–2013	New Zealand	88	(6)

Managerial career
- 2016–: Auckland City (assistant)
Medal record
Men's football
Representing New Zealand
OFC Nations Cup
Winner	1998 Australia
Winner	2002 New Zealand
Winner	2008 Oceania
Runner-up	2000 Tahiti
Third place	2004 Australia
Third place	2012 Solomon Islands
AFC–OFC Challenge Cup
Runner-up	2003 Iran
- * Club domestic league appearances and goals as of 07:24, 7 October 2024 (UTC) ‡ National team caps and goals as of 22:50, 10 September 2024 (UTC)

Ivan Robert Vicelich MNZM (Croatian: Vicelić, Croatian pronunciation: [vitselitɕ]; /ˈvɪsəlɪtʃ/ VISS-ə-litch; born 3 September 1976) is a New Zealand former professional footballer who played as a centre-back or defensive midfielder. He is his country's second most-capped international and the second most-capped player in Oceania history behind only Chris Wood, having earned 88 caps between 1995 and 2013, and represented his nation at the 2010 FIFA World Cup.

== Club career ==
Vicelich played for Waitakere City and Central United in the Lotto Sport Italia NRFL Premier before establishing himself as one of the best players for the Football Kingz, when the Auckland-based club joined the Australian National Soccer League in 1999.

Thanks to the contacts he made through his Football Kingz colleague, John Lammers, he was able to impress Roda JC Kerkrade, with whom he signed in 2001. He was a regular player for the Dutch team until May 2006 when he signed a two-year contract with fellow Eredivisie club side, RKC Waalwijk.

He returned to New Zealand and signed with Auckland City in the New Zealand Football Championship before the start of the 2008–09 season and was a key member of the Auckland squad that contested the 2009 FIFA Club World Cup in the United Arab Emirates in 2009.

In July 2010, following the 2010 FIFA World Cup in which Vicelich started every one of New Zealand's three games, he signed a short-term deal to play for Chinese Super League club Shenzhen Ruby for four months. He returned to former club Auckland City in December 2010, following a 30-day stand-down period. Aged 38, he received the adidas Bronze Ball as the third best player at the 2014 FIFA Club World Cup in Morocco – at which Auckland finished in a surprise third place – bettered only by Real Madrid duo Cristiano Ronaldo and Sergio Ramos.

He played his last game for Auckland City in the 2015 final which they won against Team Wellington on penalty kicks, qualifying for a record six consecutive times to the FIFA Club World Cup.

== International career ==
Vicelich made his full New Zealand debut with a substitute appearance in a 7–0 loss against Uruguay on 25 June 1995.

He was included in the New Zealand side for the 1999 FIFA Confederations Cup finals in Mexico where he featured in all three group games, and again for the 2003 FIFA Confederations Cup finals tournament in France, playing in just two matches.

On 16 August 2008, Vicelich announced his retirement from international football, however on 22 May 2009 he answered an SOS by All Whites head coach Ricki Herbert and was recalled to the national team for the 2009 Confederations Cup tournament in South Africa as a replacement for injured captain Ryan Nelsen. Where New Zealand would go on to earn their first ever Senior Men's International point at a FIFA tournament after a 0–0 draw with Iraq.

Vicelich continued to make himself available for selection for the crucial 2010 FIFA World Cup qualifiers against Bahrain as New Zealand vied for the right to join football's most prestigious tournament for the second time in their history.

Vicelich has played 96 times for the All Whites including a record 88 official full internationals in which he scored 7 goals, his appearance in the first leg against Bahrain equalling Vaughan Coveny's then record of 64 official international caps. He went one better in the second leg in Wellington as he helped his country reach the 2010 FIFA World Cup.

On 10 May 2010, Vicelich was named in New Zealand's final 23-man squad to compete at the 2010 FIFA World Cup. He went on to play in New Zealand's three games there.

On 25 March 2011, Vicelich captained New Zealand in their 1–1 draw with China in Wuhan. He retired from international football in 2013 after the qualifying process for the 2014 FIFA World Cup was unsuccessful, his official last game was against Mexico at the Azteca Stadium.

== Coaching career ==
In 2016 Vicelich became assistant coach at Auckland City.

== Broadcasting career ==
From 2021, he became the analyst with fellow former New Zealand goalkeeper, Jacob Spoonley, for Sky Sports as New Zealand build up to 2022 World Cup Qualification.

== Personal life ==
Vicelich is of Croatian descent. He is a former student at Liston College and Rutherford College, having graduated in 1994. His son, Luka Vicelich, plays for Auckland FC.

== Career statistics ==
=== Club ===
Appearances and goals by club, season and competition
Club	Season	League			National cup (Note: Includes KNVB Cup, Chatham Cup, Chinese FA Cup.)		Continental		Other		Total	
Club	Season	Division	Apps	Goals	Apps	Goals	Apps	Goals	Apps	Goals	Apps	Goals
Waitakere City	1993	NZ Superclub League					–		–			
Waitakere City	1994	NZ Superclub League					–		–			
Waitakere City	1995	NZ Superclub League					–		–			
Waitakere City	Total								0	0		
Central United	1996	National Soccer League					–		–			
Central United	1996–97	National Soccer League		1			–		–			
Central United	1997–98	National Soccer League					–		–			
Central United	1999	Island Soccer Leagues							–			
Central United	Total								0	0	100	18
Football Kingz	1999–2000	National Soccer League	34	3	–		–		–		34	3
Football Kingz	2000–01	National Soccer League	12	3	–		–		–		12	3
Football Kingz	Total		46	6	0	0	0	0	0	0	46	6
Roda JC Kerkrade	2000–01	Eredivisie	1	0			–		–		1	0
Roda JC Kerkrade	2001–02	Eredivisie	12	2			1 (Note: Appearance in UEFA Cup)	0	–		13	2
Roda JC Kerkrade	2002–03	Eredivisie	28	3	2	0	–		–		30	3
Roda JC Kerkrade	2003–04	Eredivisie	33	6	1	1	–		–		34	7
Roda JC Kerkrade	2004–05	Eredivisie	28	1			2 (Note: Appearance in UEFA Intertoto Cup)	0	–		30	1
Roda JC Kerkrade	2005–06	Eredivisie	27	2	1	1	3	0	–		31	3
Roda JC Kerkrade	Total		129	14	4	2	6	0	0	0	139	16
RKC Waalwijk	2006–07	Eredivisie	19	0	1	0	–		–		20	0
RKC Waalwijk	2007–08	Eerste Divisie	2	0			–		–		2	0
RKC Waalwijk	Total		21	0	1	0					22	0
Auckland City	2008–09	NZ Premiership	14	2	–		6 (Note: Appearance in OFC Champions League)	1	3 (Note: Appearances in New Zealand Football Championship play-offs)	0	23	3
Auckland City	2009–10	NZ Premiership	13	2	–		5	1	5 (Note: Two appearances in New Zealand Football Championship play-offs; three appearances in FIFA Club World Cup)	0	23	3
Auckland City	2010–11	NZ Premiership	7	0	–		5	1	2	0	14	1
Auckland City	2011–12	NZ Premiership	13	0	–		7	1	4 (Note: Two appearances, one goal in New Zealand Football Championship play-offs; one appearance in FIFA Club World Cup; one appearance, one goal in Charity Cup)	1	24	2
Auckland City	2012–13	NZ Premiership	13	1	–		9	0	5 (Note: Three appearances in New Zealand Football Championship play-offs; one appearance in FIFA Club World Cup; one appearance, one goal in Charity Cup)	1	26	2
Auckland City	2013–14	NZ Premiership	8	0	–		7	0	5 (Note: Three appearances; one goal in New Zealand Football Championship play-offs; one appearance in FIFA Club World Cup; one appearance in Charity Cup)	1	13	1
Auckland City	2014–15	NZ Premiership	14	3	–		6 (Note: Four appearances in OFC Champions League; two appearances in OFC President's Cup)	0	8 (Note: Three in New Zealand Football Championship play-offs; four appearances in FIFA Club World Cup; one appearance in Charity Cup)	0	24	3
Auckland City	Total		82	8	0	0	37	3	28	1	147	12
Shenzhen Ruby (loan)	2010	Chinese Super League	14	0	–		–		–		14	0
Career total			292	28	5	2	43	3	29	1	369	34

=== International ===
Appearances and goals by national team and year
National team	Year	Apps	Goals
New Zealand	1995	1	0
New Zealand	1996	0	0
New Zealand	1997	7	0
New Zealand	1998	4	0
New Zealand	1999	11	1
New Zealand	2000	5	0
New Zealand	2001	5	1
New Zealand	2002	6	3
New Zealand	2003	4	0
New Zealand	2004	4	0
New Zealand	2005	0	0
New Zealand	2006	4	0
New Zealand	2007	5	1
New Zealand	2008	0	0
New Zealand	2009	9	0
New Zealand	2010	6	0
New Zealand	2011	2	0
New Zealand	2012	11	0
New Zealand	2013	3	0
Total		88	6

Scores and results list New Zealand's goal tally first, score column indicates score after each Vicelich goal.

List of international goals scored by Ivan Vicelich
No.	Date	Venue	Opponent	Score	Result	Competition
1	24 June 1999	Muscat, Oman	Oman	?–?	2–2	Friendly
2	13 June 2001	North Harbour Stadium, Auckland, New Zealand	Vanuatu	7–0	7–0	2002 FIFA World Cup qualification
3	5 July 2002	North Harbour Stadium, Auckland, New Zealand	Tahiti	2–0	4–0	2002 OFC Nations Cup
4	9 July 2002	North Harbour Stadium, Auckland, New Zealand	Solomon Islands	1–0	6–1	2002 OFC Nations Cup
5	9 July 2002	North Harbour Stadium, Auckland, New Zealand	Solomon Islands	3–0	6–1	2002 OFC Nations Cup
6	17 October 2007	Churchill Park, Lautoka, Fiji	Fiji	1–0	2–0	2008 OFC Nations Cup

== Honours ==
Waitakere City

- Chatham Cup: 1994
- New Zealand Football Championship: 1995

Central United

- Chatham Cup: 1997, 1998, 2012
- New Zealand Football Championship: 1999

Auckland City

- OFC Champions League: 2009, 2011, 2012, 2013, 2014, 2015, 2016.
- FIFA Club World Cup: 2014 (Bronze medal)
- New Zealand Football Championship: 2008–09, 2013–14, 2014–15

New Zealand

- OFC Nations Cup: 1998, 2002, 2008; Runner-up, 2000; 3rd place, 2004, 2012
- AFC–OFC Challenge Cup: Runner-up, 2003

Individual

- Member of the New Zealand Order of Merit for services to football, 2015 New Year Honours
- Oceania Footballer of the Year: 2009
- New Zealand Young Player of the Year: 1994
- New Zealand International Player of the Year: 2002
- Oceania All Stars XI 2008
- Auckland Sportsman of the Year 2010
- Auckland Overall Sporting Excellence Award 2010
- Friends of Football Medal of Excellence 2014
- FIFA Club World Cup Bronze Ball: 2014
- Ivan Vicelich has the record number of consecutive participations in the FIFA Club World Cup, taking part in 2011, 2012, 2013 and 2014
- 2014–15 OFC Champions League Golden Ball
- Jack Batty Memorial Trophy: 1994, 1997
- IFFHS OFC Men's Team of the Decade 2011–2020

Halberg Awards

- Team of the Year 2010
- Supreme Award 2010
- NZs Favourite Sporting Moment 2010

== See also ==
- New Zealand men's national football team
- New Zealand at the FIFA World Cup
- New Zealand national football team results
- List of New Zealand international footballers
