= Tim Stevens (footballer) =

New Zealand footballer (born 1972)

Personal information
- Date of birth: 14 November 1972 (age 53)
- Place of birth: Sydney, Australia
- Position: Forward

Senior career*
| Years | Team | Apps | (Gls) |
- North Shore United
| 1997–1998 | Stevenage Borough | | |
- North Shore United
- Waitakere City
| 2000–2002 | Football Kingz | 23 | (5) |
- North Shore United

International career
| 1997 | New Zealand | 4 | (1) |
- * Club domestic league appearances and goals

Tim Stevens (born 14 November 1972) is a former footballer who played as a forward. He represented New Zealand at international level.

== Club career ==
Stevens played his junior football initially at Berowra in NSW and, from 1981, at New Zealand's East Coast Bays club in Auckland. He made his first team debut for Bays in the New Zealand Bluebird League in 1990. He was also selected for the New Zealand Youth Team in that year.

In 1992, he was signed by New Zealand, National League Club, North Shore United and was a key member of the North Shore team which won the Winfield Superclub Championship in 1994. He was first capped as an Auckland Representative in 1993 and toured Queensland with the Auckland Representative Team in 1994.

In 1997, still playing for North Shore United, in the National League, Stevens won the League's Golden Boot Award for most goals in the season. In that same season he completed a clean sweep by winning League Player Of The Year, Auckland Player Of The Year, the New Zealand Media's Player Of The Year and by sharing the Player's Player Of The Year award with fellow All White Danny Hay. He was also a nomination for North Harbour Sportsman Of The Year.

Stevens trialed with a number of clubs in England in late 1997 including Reading and Bournemouth before being signed by Stevenage Borough where he played half a season scoring three times in five games.

On returning to New Zealand he had brief spells back at North Shore United and at Waitakere before being signed by the Football Kingz, a professional team which competed in the Australian League.

He played for the Football Kingz in the National Soccer League between 2000 and 2002 and had the 2003 season with North Shore United before retiring from competitive football.

== International career ==
Called into the All White squad in 1994, Stevens made his international debut in a B international against the Danish Olympic side in 1995. He was a non-travelling reserve for the All White tour of South America that year.

Stevens played four official full internationals for New Zealand in June and July 1997, scoring on his debut in a 7–0 win over Papua New Guinea on 11 June. He played in a 5–0 win over Fiji before being on the losing side 0-3 and 0–2 in his final two full internationals against Australia on 28 June and 6 July 1997.
