= Dennis Ibrahim =

German footballer

Personal information
- Full name: Dennis Ibrahim Onyewenjo
- Date of birth: 24 December 1974 (age 51)
- Place of birth: Hamburg, Germany
- Height: 1.86 m (6 ft 1 in)
- Position: Forward

Youth career
- Werder Bremen

Senior career*
Years	Team	Apps	(Gls)
1995–1999	Fortuna Düsseldorf	4	(0)
1997–1999	→ Alemannia Aachen (loan)	41	(11)
1999–2000	Fortuna Köln	11	(4)
2000–2001	Football Kingz FC	24	(12)
2001–2002	Admira Wacker	12	(1)
2002–2004	Estrela da Amadora	12	(0)
Total		104	(28)
- * Club domestic league appearances and goals

Dennis Ibrahim (born 24 December 1974) is a German former professional footballer who played as a forward.

== Career ==
Born in Hamburg, Germany, Ibrahim began playing football in the youth system of Werder Bremen, before turning professional with Fortuna Düsseldorf, making a handful of substitute's appearances in the Bundesliga and 2. Bundesliga. After a spell with Alemannia Aachen in the Regionalliga, Ibrahim made some further appearances in the 2. Bundesliga with Fortuna Köln. He finished his career playing abroad in New Zealand, Austria and Portugal, making two appearances in the Primeira Liga with Estrela da Amadora.

Spotted by then Football Kingz coach Wynton Rufer during his days with Werder Bremen, Ibrahim transferred to Football Kingz FC on a one-year deal in 2000, leaving in 2001 with 12 goals to his name.

== Following retirement ==
Ibrahim participated in a charity game organized by German rapper 2schneidig in 2014 to help give donations for penurious children in Brazil.

== Personal life ==
Ibrahim was born in Germany, and is of Nigerian descent.
