= Jeff Campbell (footballer) =

New Zealand footballer (born 1979)

Personal information
- Full name: Jeffrey Campbell
- Date of birth: 25 August 1979 (age 47)
- Place of birth: New Zealand
- Height: 1.78 m (5 ft 10 in)
- Position: Attacking midfielder

Youth career
- Kogarah Waratahs

Senior career*
Years	Team	Apps	(Gls)
- Rangitoto
- Mt. Wellington AFC
1999–2004	The Football Kingz	76	(3)
2001	Adelaide City Force	1	(0)
2005	AFC Wimbledon	3	(0)
2005–2006	Hendon F.C.	34	(4)
2006	North Shore United		
2006–2007	Waitakere United	13	(2)
2007–2008	Auckland City	16	(2)
2008–2009	Waitakere United	12	(0)
2009–2010	Waikato FC	5	(3)
2011–2017	Takapuna AFC		

International career^{‡}
2000–2008	New Zealand	16	(5)
- * Club domestic league appearances and goals as of 30 April 2010 ‡ National team caps and goals as of 01:38, 26 September 2008 (UTC)

Jeffrey Campbell (born 25 August 1979) is a New Zealand football player, who played for New Zealand and professionally for the Football Kingz. He ended his career in 2017 playing for Takapuna AFC. He has represented his country at U20, U23 and senior levels.

== Club career ==
In September 2006, Jeff signed for the New Zealand Football Championship club Waitakere United for the 2006–2007 season. He also played for Waitakere United in the Oceania Champions Cup with Waitakere United winning the competition in 2007 which qualified the team for the 2007 FIFA Club World Cup in Japan where Campbell was an unused sub in their 1–2 loss to Adelaide United.

The following season, he joined Auckland City FC and again played in the 2008 Oceania Champions Cup. He joined Waikato in 2010. Finally retiring from premiership level at the end of 2015 having played 44 matches during his career at that level.

Jeff's father, Clive Campbell also represented New Zealand at international level. His brother Scott Campbell, played alongside him by Takapuna AFC.

== Professional career ==
Following unsuccessful trials with Wollongong Wolves and Sydney United, Campbell became a member of New Zealand's first professional football team, Football Kingz FC, in February 2000. On 3 March he played against the Australian league leaders, Sydney Olympic, scoring two goals in the second half to give the Kingz its first victory. He made 76 appearances for the Kingz between 2000 and 2004 with his contributions being pivotal at times.

In 2001 he signed for Australian club Adelaide City. He played only one match for Adelaide after it transpired he had been suffering from an injury when he joined the club, despite signing a two-year contract. Campbell subsequently returned to the Football Kingz, later signing for English sides AFC Wimbledon and Hendon before returning to New Zealand in 2006.

In September 2000, Campbell won the New Zealand Soccer Media Association young player of the year award, ahead of fellow nominees Chris Killen of Manchester City and Allan Pearce of Barnsley.

== International career ==
Campbell had represented New Zealand at under-20 and under-23 level, but was in line for selection to the Australian senior national team for the 2000 Summer Olympics. However, he was instead selected by the New Zealand senior team and debuted for his country in 2000 in a friendly match against Jamaica. Campbell went on to win 16 caps for New Zealand, scoring 5 goals. He was also named in the squad to play against South Africa. Later that year he played in their matches against Malaysia.

In 2002 he played in the Oceania Nations Cup for New Zealand scoring two goals to assist in them winning Group B.

In 2007 he was called up again to New Zealand as a midfielder.

In 2008 Campbell was in the squad that played Fiji.

He was again named in the 2009 squad.

Appearances and goals by national team and year
National team	Year	Apps	Goals
New Zealand	2000	6	0
New Zealand	2001	3	0
New Zealand	2002	4	5
New Zealand	2007	3	0
Total		16	5

Scores and results list Australia's goal tally first, score column indicates score after each Porter goal.

List of international goals scored by Joel Porter
No.	Date	Venue	Opponent	Score	Result	Competition	Ref.
1	5 July 2002	North Harbour Stadium, North Shore, New Zealand	Tahiti	4–0	4–0	2002 OFC Nations Cup	
2	7 July 2002	North Harbour Stadium, North Shore, New Zealand	Papua New Guinea	3–0	9–1	2002 OFC Nations Cup	
3	7 July 2002	North Harbour Stadium, North Shore, New Zealand	Papua New Guinea	7–1	9–1	2002 OFC Nations Cup	
4	9 July 2002	North Harbour Stadium, North Shore, New Zealand	Solomon Islands	4–0	6–1	2002 OFC Nations Cup	
5	9 July 2002	North Harbour Stadium, North Shore, New Zealand	Solomon Islands	5–1	6–1	2002 OFC Nations Cup	
