= Levent Osman =

Australian soccer player

Personal information
- Full name: Levent Osman
- Date of birth: 8 March 1977 (age 49)
- Place of birth: Melbourne, Australia
- Height: 1.80 m (5 ft 11 in)
- Position: Defender

Youth career
- 1994–1996: VIS

Senior career*
Years	Team	Apps	(Gls)
1994–1996	Albion Redsox	60	(4)
1996–1998	Gippsland Falcons	34	(4)
1998	Green Gully	14	(3)
1998–1999	Gippsland Falcons	24	(3)
1999–2002	Auckland Kingz	61	(4)
2002	Tampere United	18	(0)
2002–2003	Trabzonspor	12	(0)
2002–2003	Politehnica Timişoara	17	(0)
2003–2004	South Melbourne	16	(0)
2004–2007	Altona Magic	63	(0)
2008–2010	Dandenong Thunder	68	(0)
Total		387	(18)

International career
1997	Australia U20	14	(1)
1997–1999	Australia U23	8	(0)
- * Club domestic league appearances and goals as of 20 November 2012

Levent Osman (born 8 March 1977 in Melbourne) is an Australian former association football player of Turkish Cypriot descent. He played as a defender.

== Career ==
He has previously played for Trabzonspor in Turkey, FCU Politehnica Timişoara in Romania, Tampere United in Finland as well as South Melbourne, Auckland Kingz in (New Zealand) and Gippsland Falcons in the Australian NSL.

He has represented Australia at under-20 level and in the Olympic team between 1997 and 1999.

He was awarded Youth Player of the Year 1997. He was also the winner of the Jimmy Rooney Medal(Man of the Match) in the 2004 Premier League Grand Final.
