= Jonathan Perry (footballer) =

New Zealand footballer

Personal information
- Full name: Jonathan Mark Perry
- Date of birth: 22 November 1976 (age 49)
- Place of birth: Hamilton, New Zealand
- Height: 1.83 m (6 ft 0 in)
- Position: Defender

Senior career*
Years	Team	Apps	(Gls)
- Hamilton Wanderers
- North Shore United
- Waikato United
1993–1998	Barnsley		
1999	Metro A.F.C.		
1999–2003	The Football Kingz		
2005–2007	Auckland City FC	17	(0)
2008–2009	Waitakere United	24	(2)

International career
1998–2002	New Zealand	28	(2)
Medal record
Representing New Zealand
Men's Association football
OFC Nations Cup
Winner	1998 Australia
Winner	2002 New Zealand
Runner-up	2000 Tahiti
- * Club domestic league appearances and goals

Jonathan Perry (born 22 November 1976) is a former New Zealand soccer player who played as a defender.

== Playing career ==
Perry played for the New Zealand national soccer team, the All Whites, collecting 28 caps (2 goals) in official FIFA internationals. He played his last game for New Zealand against Solomon Islands in July 2002.

== Honours ==
New Zealand

- OFC Nations Cup: 1998, 2002; Runner-up, 2000
