= Riki van Steeden =

New Zealand footballer

Personal information
- Full name: Riki Lee van Steeden
- Date of birth: 24 December 1976 (age 49)
- Place of birth: Nelson, New Zealand
- Height: 1.86 m (6 ft 1 in)
- Position: Defender

Senior career*
Years	Team	Apps	(Gls)
- Nelson Suburbs
- Christchurch Technical
1998–1999	Carlton	2	(0)
1999–2003	Football Kingz	48	(2)
2005–2013	Auckland City	26	(2)

International career
1997	New Zealand	5	(1)
- * Club domestic league appearances and goals

Riki van Steeden (born 24 December 1976) is a former professional association football player, who played as a defender. He was part of the Auckland City team at the 2009 FIFA Club World Cup, and played five times for the New Zealand national team in 1997.

== Club career ==
Van Steeden played for Nelson Suburbs and Christchurch Technical before he moved to Australia to join Carlton SC. In 1999, he joined the Football Kingz for their inaugural season in the National Soccer League, appearing 48 times and scoring 2 goals. Van Steeden moved to Auckland City in 2005, making 26 appearances and netting 2 goals, including the winner in Auckland City’s 3-2 FIFA Club World Cup win over 10-man African champions TP Mazembe in 2009.

Van Steeden stood in for head coach Ramon Tribulietx in Auckland's home game against Hawke's Bay United in December 2013 (Tribulietx was away visiting family in Barcelona after Auckland's exit from the Club World Cup finals in Morocco). Van Steeden retired from playing in 2013, and joined the Auckland coaching staff as assistant to Tribulietx.

== International career ==
Van Steeden made his full debut for the New Zealand national team in a 1–0 win over Fiji on 7 June 1997. He earned five international caps, scoring one goal. His final cap was a substitute appearance in a 5–0 loss to Indonesia on 21 September that same year.

== Outside football ==
After retiring from football, Van Steeden worked as a television producer for Sky New Zealand. He later joined HBS as an expert live-sports director. He helps co-ordinate multiple high-profile events all over the world, including broadcasting services for FIFA tournaments and the CONCACAF Gold Cup.
