= Paul Urlovic =

New Zealand footballer (born 1978)

Personal information
- Full name: Paul-Mark Urlovic
- Date of birth: 21 November 1978 (age 47)
- Place of birth: Auckland, New Zealand
- Height: 1.78 m (5 ft 10 in)
- Position: Striker

Senior career*
Years	Team	Apps	(Gls)
1996–1999;2012	Central United FC	146	(136)
1999–2000	Melbourne Knights	24	(4)
2000–2003	Football Kingz	59	(16)
2005–2009	Auckland City	114	(51)
2010–2011	Three Kings United	24	(13)

International career
- New Zealand U17
- New Zealand U20
- New Zealand U23
1998–2006	New Zealand	27	(5)
Medal record
Representing New Zealand
Men's Association football
OFC Nations Cup
Winner	1998 Australia
Winner	2002 New Zealand
Runner-up	2000 Tahiti
- * Club domestic league appearances and goals as of 10 April 2009

Paul-Mark Urlovic (born 21 November 1978) is a New Zealand former professional footballer who played as striker for Central United FC in the NRFL Premier Division. Urlovic previously played for Auckland City in the ASB Premiership and Oceania Champions League.

== Early life ==
Urlovic was raised in Auckland and attended Liston College.

== Club career ==
Urlovic was a member of the Auckland City squad that contested the FIFA Club World Cup in Japan in 2006 and UAE in 2009.

== International career ==
After representing New Zealand at U17, U20 and U23 level, Urlovic made his New Zealand full international debut on as a substitute in an 8 - 1 victory over Vanuatu on 28 September 1998. He played 27 A-internationals for the All Whites, between 1998 and 2006 scoring 5 goals.

== Career statistics ==
=== International ===
Appearances and goals by national team and year
National team	Year	Apps	Goals
New Zealand	1998	2	0
New Zealand	1999	6	1
New Zealand	2000	10	1
New Zealand	2001	5	1
New Zealand	2002	2	2
New Zealand	2006	2	0
Total		27	5

Scores and results list New Zealand's goal tally first, score column indicates score after each Urlovic goal.

List of international goals scored by Paul Urlovic
No.	Date	Venue	Opponent	Score	Result	Competition	Ref.
1	3 July 1999	Kuala Lumpur, Malaysia	Malaysia	–	5–1	Friendly	
2	19 August 2000	Merdeka Stadium, Kuala Lumpur, Malaysia	Malaysia	2–0	2–0	Friendly	
3	11 June 2001	North Harbour Stadium, North Shore City, New Zealand	Solomon Islands	5–0	5–1	2002 FIFA World Cup qualification	
4	5 July 2002	North Harbour Stadium, North Shore City, New Zealand	Tahiti	3–0	4–0	2002 OFC Nations Cup	
5	9 July 2002	North Harbour Stadium, North Shore City, New Zealand	Solomon Islands	2–0	6–1	2002 OFC Nations Cup	

== Honours ==
New Zealand

- OFC Nations Cup: 1998, 2002; Runner-up, 2000

== Achievements ==
FIFA Confederations Cup Mexico 1999; Oceania Nations Cup Champions 1998 & 2002; FIFA Club World Cup Japan 2006 (6th place) & UAE 2009 (5th place); Oceania Club Champions 2006 & 2009; NZ National League Champions 1999, 2005, 2006, 2007 & 2009; Chatham Cup Winners 1997, 1998, 2005, 2007 & 2012; New Zealand Young Player of the Year 1998 NZ National League Golden Boot 1999; NRFL Premier Division Golden Boot 2012; NZ Rep U17. U20, U23 & Full International;
