= Harry Ngata =

New Zealand footballer

Personal information
- Full name: Heremia Ngata
- Date of birth: 24 August 1971 (age 55)
- Place of birth: Wanganui, New Zealand
- Height: 1.77 m (5 ft 10 in)
- Position: Midfielder

Youth career
- –1989: Hull City

Senior career*
Years	Team	Apps	(Gls)
1989–1992	Hull City	25	(0)
1993	North Shore United		
1994–1995	Brunswick Juventus	18	(2)
1995	North Shore United		
1996	Thomastown Zebras	24	(2)
1997	Bulleen Inter Kings	16	(2)
1998	North Shore United		
1998–1999	Bohemians	4	(0)
1999–2004	Football Kingz	127	(27)
Total		214	(33)

International career
1993–2001	New Zealand	28	(3)
Medal record
Representing New Zealand
Men's Association football
OFC Nations Cup
Winner	1998 Australia
Runner-up	2000 Tahiti
- * Club domestic league appearances and goals

Heremaia "Harry" Ngata (born 24 August 1971) is a former New Zealand association football player who played as a midfielder.

== Club career ==
Ngata began his career with Hull City in England, and may have been the first Maori footballer to play in the English league. Ngata won 1998 New Zealand Players' Player of the Year award, whilst playing with North Shore United, where he won the club's Player of the Year award twice. One of the most successful parts of his career was the five years that he spent playing for the Kingz in the Australian NSL. where he became very popular.

== International career ==
Ngata scored New Zealand's goal in his full All Whites debut, a 1–3 loss against Saudi Arabia on 28 April 1993. He was included in the New Zealand side for the 1999 Confederations Cup finals tournament and he ended his international playing career with 28 A-international caps and 3 goals to his credit, his final cap a substitute appearance in a 7–0 win over Vanuatu on 13 June 2001.

== Post-retirement ==
Ngata works occasionally as a football commentator for SKY TV in New Zealand. He has worked in the role of Sports Ambassador for the SPARC organisation (Sport & Recreation New Zealand).

== Honours ==
New Zealand

- OFC Nations Cup: 1998; Runner-up, 2000
