= Football Kingz FC =

- Full name: Football Kingz Football Club Ltd
- Nicknames: Kingz, Kingz FC, Auckland Kingz
- Founded: 1999; 27 years ago (as Auckland Kingz Football Club)
- Dissolved: 2004; 22 years ago (replaced by New Zealand Knights FC)
- Ground: Mt Smart Stadium; North Harbour Stadium
- League: National Soccer League
Home colours

The Football Kingz were a New Zealand professional football club based in Penrose, Auckland. They played in the Australian National Soccer League from 1999 until their disestablishment in 2004, when they were replaced by the New Zealand Knights as an inaugural participant in the newly established Australian A-League.

== History ==
Chart of yearly table positions for Football Kingz in NSL

Football Kingz F.C. (promoted as Auckland Kingz within Australia) joined the Australian National Soccer League in 1999 and proceeded to play in the last five seasons of the NSL, failing to qualify for the play-offs in every season. The club was originally to use the spelling of "Kings", however this was changed to the Kingz after receiving legal threats from Australian basketball team the Sydney Kings.

=== The first season: 1999–2000 ===
Their inaugural coach was OFC Player of the Century and former New Zealand international Wynton Rufer in a player-coach role, with his brother Shane as assistant coach. They played their inaugural game on the evening of 1 October 1999 at North Harbour Stadium in front of then the largest crowd to watch a club game in New Zealand. The game was played against Carlton SC and even though it resulted in a 0–3 loss was an enthralling start to the professional era in New Zealand. This first season would end up being the club's most successful with 15 wins. The team finished eighth of sixteen teams.

=== Season Two: 2000–01 ===
After an encouraging first season the club set out to improve its performance on and off the park. There were a number of foreign signings, mostly from Brazil, that seemed good on paper but flopped on the park. One of these imports though immediately became a fan favourite, Dennis Ibrahim. The German went on to become the club's top scorer during the season, managing two hat-tricks (in a 3–2 win over the Brisbane Strikers at home on 30 March 2001 and against Sydney United in a 4–2 away win on 29 April 2001). The team's best result proved to be a 5–1 home win over the Newcastle Breakers on 27 October 2000. The team again finished in eighth place, winning 12 games.

=== Season Three: 2001–02 ===
Seasons One and Two showed the potential of the team (they would turn out to be the most successful seasons from a professional New Zealand football team until the Wellington Phoenix FC made the play-offs in 2009) and so Sky Television New Zealand became involved in the club. Their first move was to remove Wynton Rufer as coach while still wanting him to remain a player. Rufer's desire, however, was to remain as coach and to retire slowly as a player, and he immediately retired from playing. Mike Petersen was signed as the new manager and he brought with him a number of players including a young goalkeeper Michael Theoklitos to be part of the squad. His tenure lasted just five games. He started the season with a loss away to the Brisbane Strikers and three games later presided over an embarrassing 2–7 home loss to Perth Glory. The following game, a 2–2 draw away to Wollongong Wolves on 2 November 2001 was his last, walking out after it. A number of Australian players soon following him. Shane Rufer stepped in to become the club's caretaker manager. This tenure only lasted for two games but he achieved a win and draw from these games. Kevin Fallon was announced as the new manager, but the damage to the club had already been done and it ended up finishing with the "wooden spoon" in 13th place, this costing Fallon his job.

=== Season Four: 2002–03 ===
After the previous season's poor form, the club's owners drastically slashed the club's budget. Ken Dugdale was signed as the new coach. He had just finished a very successful stint as the manager of the All Whites, having won the OFC Nations Cup and managed the team through their first involvement in the Confederations Cup where the All Whites performed very well. As he had a reduced budget he recruited from around New Zealand introducing to the team Raf de Gregorio and Jeremy Christie. While the club had some very talented young players it struggled to compete but managed to achieve a better final position in the National Soccer League than the season before, finishing 11 out of 13.

=== The final season: 2003–04 ===
The National Soccer League was in a very bad financial state and fans were losing interest across the competition. This led the Australian Government to commission a report in to Soccer Australia and the NSL. Its recommendation was to abolish both Soccer Australia and the NSL and replace them with a new governing body and a new competition (Soccer Australia was broke and the NSL was unable to break away from its Euro Ethnic roots in parts of Australia). Knowing that this was going to be the last NSL season very little was spent on improving the squad and rumours spread that the club was struggling financially. Ken Dugdale remained manager, but the season started the way the previous one had finished. The club struggled on the playing field. In mid-season an announcement was made that the club was being bought out and its debts cleared. This was to cost Ken Dugdale his job and he was replaced on a temporary basis by his assistant Tommy Mason. Mason was soon confirmed as the club's permanent manager, even though many felt that he was not up to the role. The new owners felt that the playing squad needed strengthening and brought Danny Hay in, making him the new captain at the same time. Even with this new impetus the club again finished bottom of the league having only won four games. The club's very last game was on Sunday 29 February 2004 winning 4–3 at home to the Brisbane Strikers.

== All time records ==
- Record victory: 5–1 vs Newcastle United (H), 26 October 2000
- Record defeat: 0–7 vs Parramatta Power (A), 14 February 2003
- Highest aggregate score: 9 goals: (2 games, both losses)

2–7 vs Perth Glory (H), 25 October 2001
4–5 vs South Melbourne (H), 15 March 2003

- Record league attendance: 13,111 (vs Marconi Stallions 16 March 2001)
- Lowest league attendance: 1,057 (vs Northern Spirit FC 27 February 2003)

Home attendance figures for the final season are not included

- Longest winning streak: 3 games (15 November 2002 – 6 December 2002)
- Longest undefeated streak: 7 games (23 February 2001 – 6 April 2001)
- Longest losing streak: 7 games (15 March 2003 – 7 November 2003)
- Longest winless streak: 9 games (29 November 2003 – 10 January 2004)
- Most goals in a game: 4 – Harry Ngata vs Northern Spirit (H), 27 September 2002
- Most goals in a season: 12 – Dennis Ibrahim 2001–2002
- All-time most appearances: 129 – Harry Ngata
- All-time top scorer: 29 – Harry Ngata

== National Soccer League ==
=== NSL seasonal results ===
Results of league and cup competitions by season
Season	Division	Pld	W	D	L	GF	GA	Pts	Pos	Finals	Name(s)	Goals
Season	League									Finals	Top goalscorer(s)	
1999–2000	NSL	34	15	5	14	57	59	50	8th	DNQ	(Chile) Aaron Silva	11
2000–01	NSL	30	12	7	11	52	52	43	8th	DNQ	(Germany) Dennis Ibrahim	12
2001–02	NSL	24	3	5	16	28	58	14	13th	DNQ	(New Zealand) Paul Urlovic	9
2002–03	NSL	24	6	6	12	26	45	24	11th	DNQ	(New Zealand) Harry Ngata	8
2003–04	NSL	24	4	3	17	25	51	15	13th	DNQ	(New Zealand) Harry Ngata	8

=== All-time NSL win/loss ===
Club	Pld	Wins	Draw	Loss	Goals For	Goals Against	Goal Diff
Adelaide Force	10	8	1	1	6	20	−14
Adelaide United FC	2	0	0	2	1	4	−3
Brisbane Strikers	10	4	2	4	16	18	−2
Canberra Cosmos	4	2	0	2	8	6	2
Carlton S.C.	4	2	1	1	7	4	3
Eastern Pride / Gippsland Falcons	2/2	2/1	0/1	0/0	5/3	2/1	3/2
Marconi Stallions	10	5	1	4	17	14	3
Melbourne Knights	10	1	4	5	14	21	−7
Newcastle Breakers	2	0	1	1	1	2	−1
Newcastle United	8	3	1	4	12	11	1
Northern Spirit	10	2	0	8	16	23	−7
Parramatta Power	10	4	1	5	16	26	−10
Perth Glory	10	1	1	8	12	33	−21
South Melbourne	10	3	1	6	12	26	−14
Sydney Olympic	10	4	2	4	15	18	−3
Sydney United	10	3	2	5	10	13	−3
Wollongong Wolves	12	2	7	3	17	23	−6
Total	136	47	26	63	188	265	-77

== Managers ==
Name	Nat	From	To	Record							
Name	Nat	From	To	P	W	D	L	F	A	GD	Pts
Wynton Rufer	(New Zealand)	October 1999	April 2001	64	27	12	25	109	111	−2	91
Mike Petersen^{a}	(Australia)	October 2001	October 2001	4	0	1	3	6	14	−8	1
Shane Rufer^{b}	(New Zealand)	November 2001	November 2001	2	1	1	0	4	3	1	4
Kevin Fallon	(England)	November 2001	April 2002	18	2	3	13	18	41	−23	9
Ken Dugdale^{c}	(England)	September 2002	November 2003	32	7	7	18	36	63	−27	28
Tommy Mason	(New Zealand)	November 2003	February 2004	16	3	2	11	15	33	−18	11
Total		October 1999	February 2004	136	40	26	70	188	265	-77	146

== Player records ==
=== Most appearances ===
#	Name	Kingz career	Appearances	Goals
1	(New Zealand) Harry Ngata	1999–2003	129	29
2	(New Zealand) Chris Jackson	1999–2004	100	1
3	(New Zealand) Jonathan Perry	1999–2003	90	7
4	(New Zealand) Jeff Campbell	1999–2004	76	2
5=	(New Zealand) Mark Burton	2000–2004	69	3
5=	(Australia) Levent Osman	1999–2002	69	2
7	(New Zealand) Paul Urlovic	2000–2003	59	16
8	(New Zealand) Michael Utting	1999–2000; 2002–2004	49	0
9=	(New Zealand) Wynton Rufer	1999–2001	48	12
9=	(New Zealand) Riki van Steeden	1999–2003	48	2

=== Most goals ===
#	Name	Kingz career	Goals	Appearances
1	(New Zealand) Harry Ngata	1999–2003	29	129
2	(New Zealand) Paul Urlovic	2000–2003	16	59
3	(Chile) Aaron Silva	1999–2001	13	32
4=	(Germany) Dennis Ibrahim	2000–2001	12	24
4=	(New Zealand) Wynton Rufer	1999–2001	12	48
6	(Australia) Andy Vlahos	2001–2003	9	45

== See also ==
- Wellington Phoenix FC
- New Zealand Knights FC
- New Zealand Football
- Football Federation Australia
- A-League

== Notes ==
^{a} Caretaker manager during October 2001. ^{b} Caretaker manager for two games. ^{c} Resigned after eight games in 2003.
