= List of OFC Men's Nations Cup finals =

- Founded: 1973
- Region: Oceania (OFC)
- Teams: 8
- Current champions: New Zealand (6th title)
- Most championships: New Zealand (6 titles)

The OFC Men's Nations Cup in an association football competition established in 1973. It is contested by the men's national teams of the members of the Oceania Football Confederation (OFC), the sport's Oceania governing body, and takes place every four years. The winners of the first final was New Zealand, who defeated Tahiti 2–0 in Auckland. The most recent final, hosted in Port Vila, was also won by New Zealand, who beat Vanuatu 3–0.

The Nations Cup final is the last match of competition, and the result determines which country's team is declared Oceania champion. As of the 2024 tournament, if after 90 minutes of regular play the score is a draw, an additional 30-minute period of play, called extra time, is added. If such a game is still tied after extra time, it is decided by penalty shoot-out. The team that wins the penalty shoot-out are then declared champions. In 2008, there was no final played; the winner was only decided in a round-robin tournament.

New Zealand is the most successful team in the history of the tournament, winning six titles. New Zealand has won the most finals with five, followed by Australia with four. New Caledonia has qualified for the final twice without success.

== List of OFC Nations Cup Finals ==
Key to the list of finals
| † | Match was won after extra time |
| ‡ | Match was won via a penalty shoot-out |
| & | Match was won after a replay |

- The "Year" column refers to the year the championship tournament was held, and wikilinks to the article about that tournament.
- Links in the "Winners" and "Runners-up" columns point to the articles for the national football teams of the countries, not the articles for the countries.
- The wikilinks in the "Score" column point to the article about that tournament's final game.

List of finals matches, their venues and locations, the finalists and final scores
| Year | Winners | Score | Runners-up | Venue | Location | Attendance | References |
|---|---|---|---|---|---|---|---|
| 1973 | New Zealand | 2–0 | Tahiti | Newmarket Park | Auckland, New Zealand | | |
| 1980 | Australia | 4–2 | Tahiti | | Nouméa, New Caledonia | | |
| 1996 | Australia | 6–0 | Tahiti | Olympic Stadium | Papeete, Tahiti | 5,000 | |
| 1996 | Australia | 5–0 | Tahiti | Bruce Stadium | Canberra, Australia | 5,000 | |
| 1998 | New Zealand | 1–0 | Australia | Lang Park | Brisbane, Australia | 12,000 | |
| 2000 | Australia | 2–0 | New Zealand | Stade Pater | Papeete, Tahiti | 300 | |
| 2002 | New Zealand | 1–0 | Australia | Ericsson Stadium | Auckland, New Zealand | 4,000 | |
| 2004 | Australia | 5–1 | Solomon Islands | Lawson Tama Stadium | Honiara, Solomon Islands | 21,000 | |
| 2004 | Australia | 6–0 | Solomon Islands | Sydney Football Stadium | Sydney, Australia | 19,208 | |
| 2008 | New Zealand | No final | New Caledonia | Round-robin format | | | |
| 2012 | Tahiti | 1–0 | New Caledonia | Lawson Tama Stadium | Honiara, Solomon Islands | 10,000 | |
| 2016 | New Zealand | 0–0 ^{‡} (Note: Score was 0–0 after 120 minutes. New Zealand won the penalty shoot-out 4–2.) | Papua New Guinea | Sir John Guise Stadium | Port Moresby, Papua New Guinea | 13,000 | |
| 2020 | Cancelled due to COVID-19 pandemic in Oceania | | | | | | |
| 2024 | New Zealand | 3–0 | Vanuatu | VFF Freshwater Stadium | Port Vila, Vanuatu | 10,000 | |

== Results by nation ==
| National team | Winners | Runners-up | Total finals | Years won | Years runners-up |
|---|---|---|---|---|---|
| New Zealand | 6 | 1 | 7 | 1973, 1998, 2002, 2008, 2016, 2024 | 2000 |
| Australia | 4 | 2 | 6 | 1980, 1996, 2000, 2004 | 1998, 2002 |
| Tahiti | 1 | 3 | 4 | 2012 | 1973, 1980, 1996 |
| Solomon Islands | 0 | 1 | 1 | | 2004 |
| New Caledonia | 0 | 1 | 1 | | 2012 |
| Papua New Guinea | 0 | 1 | 1 | | 2016 |
| Vanuatu | 0 | 1 | 1 | | 2024 |

== See also ==
- List of FIFA Confederations Cup finals
- List of FIFA World Cup finals
- List of UEFA European Championship finals
- List of Copa América finals
- List of CONCACAF Gold Cup finals
- List of Africa Cup of Nations finals
- List of AFC Asian Cup finals
