= OFC Men's Nations Cup records and statistics =

This is a list of records and statistics of the OFC Men's Nations Cup.

== General statistics by tournament ==
Year	Hosts	Champion	Winning coach	Top scorer(s) (goals)	Best player award
1973	New Zealand	New Zealand	(England) Barrie Truman	(New Caledonia) Segin Wayewol (3) (New Zealand) Alan Marley (3)	—N/a
1980	New Caledonia	Australia	(West Germany) Rudi Gutendorf	(Australia) Ian Hunter (5) (Australia) Eddie Krncevic (5)	—N/a
1996	various	Australia	(Scotland) Eddie Thomson	(Australia) Kris Trajanovski (7)	—N/a
1998	Australia	New Zealand	(England) Ken Dugdale	(Australia) Damian Mori (10)	—N/a
2000	Tahiti	Australia	(Australia) Frank Farina	(Australia) Craig Foster (5) (Australia) Clayton Zane (5)	—N/a
2002	New Zealand	New Zealand	(England) Mick Waitt	(Australia) Joel Porter (6)	—N/a
2004	Australia	Australia	(Australia) Frank Farina	(Australia) Tim Cahill (6) (New Zealand) Vaughan Coveny (6)	—N/a
2008	various	New Zealand	(New Zealand) Ricki Herbert	(New Zealand) Shane Smeltz (8)	—N/a
2012	Solomon Islands	Tahiti	(French Polynesia) Eddy Etaeta	(New Caledonia) Jacques Haeko (6)	(French Polynesia) Nicolas Vallar
2016	Papua New Guinea	New Zealand	(England) Anthony Hudson	(Papua New Guinea) Raymond Gunemba (5)	(Papua New Guinea) David Muta
2024	Fiji; Vanuatu	New Zealand	(England) Darren Bazeley	(Fiji) Roy Krishna (5)	(New Zealand) Liberato Cacace

== Debut of national teams ==
Year	Debuting teams			Successor teams
Year	Teams	No.	Cum.	Successor teams
1973	Fiji, New Caledonia, New Hebrides, New Zealand, Tahiti	5	5	
1980	Australia, Papua New Guinea, Solomon Islands	3	8	
1996	None	0	8	
1998	Cook Islands	1	9	Vanuatu
2000	None	0	9	
2002	None	0	9	
2004	None	0	9	
2008	None	0	9	
2012	Samoa	1	10	
2016	None	0	10	
2024	None	0	10	

Never qualified:

- American Samoa
- Kiribati
- Niue
- Tonga
- Tuvalu

== Drought ==
Team	Last Appearance	Missed tournaments
Cook Islands	2000	6

Note: Australia is not on the list because it is no longer part of the OFC.

== Streaks ==
Team	Qualified Since	Number of participations
New Zealand	1973	11
Vanuatu	1998	8
Fiji	2002	6
New Caledonia	2008	4
Tahiti	2012	3
Papua New Guinea	2012	3
Samoa	2012	3
Solomon Islands	2012	3

== Overall team records ==
In this ranking 3 points are awarded for a win, 1 for a draw and 0 for a loss. As per statistical convention in football, matches decided in extra time are counted as wins and losses, while matches decided by penalty shoot-outs are counted as draws. Teams are ranked by total points, then by goal difference, then by goals scored.

As of 2024 OFC Men's Nations Cup

Rank	Team	Part	Pld	W	D	L	GF	GA	GD	Pts
1	New Zealand	11	48	36	4	8	125	39	+86	112
2	Australia	6	28	24	2	2	142	13	+129	74
3	Tahiti	10	42	20	6	16	85	89	−4	66
4	New Caledonia	6	27	12	4	11	65	52	+13	40
5	Fiji	9	37	12	4	21	56	73	−17	40
6	Vanuatu	10	40	10	2	28	44	93	−49	32
7	Solomon Islands	8	30	7	4	19	31	74	−43	25
8	Papua New Guinea	5	17	4	6	7	27	49	−22	18
9	Cook Islands	2	4	0	0	4	1	41	−40	0
10	Samoa	3	9	0	0	9	3	56	−53	0

== Medal table ==
The first four editions of the competition had only four or five teams and played in one single group. Since 1973, the final tournament has introduced the knockout stage. Since 2016, no third place play-off has been played. Since 2024, losing semi-finalists are ranked by the OFC based on goal difference in the semi-finals.

Rank	Nation	Gold	Silver	Bronze	Total
1	New Zealand	6	1	2	9
2	Australia	4	2	0	6
3	Tahiti	1	3	2	6
4	New Caledonia	0	2	2	4
5	Solomon Islands	0	1	1	2
6	Papua New Guinea	0	1	0	1
6	Vanuatu	0	1	0	1
8	Fiji	0	0	2	2
Totals (8 entries)		11	11	9	31

== Comprehensive team results by tournament ==
Legend

- 1st – Champions
- 2nd – Runners-up
- 3rd – Third place
- 4th – Fourth place
- SF – Semi-finals (in years without a 3rd/4th play-off)
- 5th — Fifth place
- 6th — Sixth place
- GS – Group stage
- Q — Qualified for an upcoming tournament
- •• — Qualified but withdrew
- • — Did not qualify
- × — Did not enter / Withdrew / Banned
- — Hosts

For each tournament, the number of teams in each finals tournament (in brackets) are shown.

Team	1973 (New Zealand) (5)	1980 (New Caledonia) (8)	1996 (Pacific Community) (4)	1998 (Australia) (6)	2000 (French Polynesia) (6)	2002 (New Zealand) (8)	2004 (Australia) (6)	2008 (Pacific Community) (4)	2012 (Solomon Islands) (8)	2016 (Papua New Guinea) (8)	2024 (Vanuatu) (Fiji) (8)	Years
New Zealand	1st	GS	SF	1st	2nd	1st	3rd	1st	3rd	1st	1st	11
Tahiti	2nd	2nd	2nd	4th	GS	3rd	5th	•	1st	GS	3rd	10
Vanuatu (Note: Includes results as New Hebrides.)	4th	GS	•	GS	4th	4th	6th	4th	GS	GS	2nd	10
Fiji	5th	4th	•	3rd	••	GS	4th	3rd	GS	GS	4th	9
Solomon Islands	×	GS	SF	•	3rd	GS	2nd	•	4th	SF	GS	8
Australia	×	1st	1st	2nd	1st	2nd	1st	Member of AFC				6
New Caledonia	3rd	3rd	•	•	•	GS	•	2nd	2nd	SF	••	6
Papua New Guinea	×	GS	•	•	•	GS	•	×	GS	2nd	GS	5
Samoa (Note: Includes results as Western Samoa.)	×	×	•	•	•	•	•	•	GS	GS	GS	3
Cook Islands	×	×	×	GS	GS	×	•	•	•	•	•	2
Tonga	×	×	•	•	•	•	•	•	•	•	•	0
American Samoa	×	×	•	•	•	•	•	•	•	•	×	0
Niue	Not an OFC member						×	×	×	×	(Note: Not an OFC member)	0
Kiribati	Not an OFC member							×	×	×	×	0
Tuvalu	Not an OFC member							•	×	×	×	0

== Team: Tournament position ==
=== All-time ===
Most championships
6, New Zealand (1973, 1998, 2002, 2008, 2016, 2024)

Most finishes in the top two
7, New Zealand (1973, 1998, 2000, 2002, 2008, 2016, 2024)

Most finishes in the top four
10, New Zealand (1973, 1996, 1998, 2000, 2002, 2004, 2008, 2012, 2016, 2024)

Most second-place finishes
3, Tahiti (1973, 1980, 1996)

=== Consecutive ===
Most consecutive championships
2, Australia (1980, 1996), New Zealand (2016, 2024)

Most consecutive finishes in the top two
6, Australia (1980, 1996, 1998, 2000, 2002, 2004)

Most consecutives finishes in the top four
8, New Zealand (1998, 2000, 2002, 2004, 2008, 2012, 2016, 2024)

=== Gaps ===
Longest gap between successive titles
25 years, New Zealand (1973–1998)

Longest gap between successive appearances in the top two
16 years, Tahiti (1996–2012)

Longest gap between successive appearances in the top four
16 years, Fiji (2008–2024), Vanuatu (2008–2024)

=== Host team ===
Best finish by host team
Champions, New Zealand (1973, 2002), Australia (2004)

=== Debuting teams ===
Best finish by a debuting team
Champions, New Zealand (1973), Australia (1980)

=== Other ===
Most finishes in the top two without ever being champion
2, New Caledonia (2008, 2012)

Most finishes in the top four without ever being champion
5, Fiji (1980, 1998, 2004, 2008, 2024), Solomon Islands (1996, 2000, 2004, 2012, 2016), Vanuatu (1973, 2000, 2002, 2008, 2024)

Most finishes in the top four without ever finishing in the top two
5, Fiji (1980, 1998, 2004, 2008, 2024)

== Team: Tournament progression ==
=== All-time ===
Progressed from the group stage the most times
10, New Zealand (1973, 1996, 1998, 2000, 2002, 2004, 2008, 2012, 2016, 2024)

Eliminated in the group stage the most times
4, Papua New Guinea (1980, 2002, 2012, 2024), Vanuatu (1980, 1998, 2012, 2016)

Most appearances, never progressed from the group stage
3, Samoa (2012, 2016, 2024)

=== Consecutive ===
Most consecutive progressions from the group stage
9, New Zealand (1996, 1998, 2000, 2002, 2004, 2008, 2012, 2016, 2024)

Most consecutive eliminations from the group stage
3, Samoa (2012, 2016, 2024)

== Team: Matches played/goals scored ==
=== All-time ===
Most matches played
48, New Zealand

Most wins
36, New Zealand

Most losses
28, Vanuatu

Most draws
6, Papua New Guinea, Tahiti

Most matches played without a win
9, Samoa

Most goals scored
142, Australia

Most goals conceded
93, Vanuatu

Fewest goals scored
1, Cook Islands

Fewest goals conceded
13, Australia

Most meetings between two teams, final match
3 times, Australia vs New Zealand (1998, 2000, 2002, 2004)

== Hosts ==
Times	Nation	Year(s)
2	New Zealand	1973, 2002
2	Australia	1998, 2004
1	New Caledonia	1980
1	Tahiti	2000
1	Solomon Islands	2012
1	Papua New Guinea	2016
1	Vanuatu	2024
1	Fiji	2024
2	No host	1996, 2008

== Performances by host nations ==
Year	Host nation(s)	Finish
1973	New Zealand	Champions
1980	New Caledonia	Third place
1996	No host	
1998	Australia	Runners-up
2000	Tahiti	Group stage
2002	New Zealand	Champions
2004	Australia	Champions
2008	No host	
2012	Solomon Islands	Fourth place
2016	Papua New Guinea	Runners-up
2024	Vanuatu Fiji	Runners-up
2024	Vanuatu Fiji	Fourth place

== Performances by defending finalists ==
Year	Defending champions	Finish	Defending runners-up	Finish
1980	New Zealand	Group stage	Tahiti	Runners-up
1996	Australia	Champions	Tahiti	Runners-up
1998	Australia	Runners-up	Tahiti	Fourth place
2000	New Zealand	Runners-up	Australia	Champions
2002	Australia	Runners-up	New Zealand	Champions
2004	New Zealand	Third place	Australia	Champions
2008	Australia	Moved to AFC	Solomon Islands	Did not qualify
2012	New Zealand	Third place	New Caledonia	Runners-up
2016	Tahiti	Group stage	New Caledonia	Semi-finals
2024	New Zealand	Champions	Papua New Guinea	Group stage

== Teams yet to qualify for finals ==
The following five teams which are current OFC members have never qualified for the Nations Cup.

Legend

- • – Did not qualify
- × – Did not enter / Withdrew / Banned

For each tournament, the number of teams in each finals tournament (in brackets) are shown.

Team (5)	1973 (5)	1980 (8)	1996 (4)	1998 (6)	2000 (6)	2002 (8)	2004 (6)	2008 (4)	2012 (8)	2016 (8)	2024 (8)	Attempts
American Samoa	×	×	•	•	•	•	•	•	•	•	×	8
Kiribati	Not an OFC member							×	×	×	×	0
Niue	Not an OFC member						×	×	×	×	×	0
Tonga	×	×	•	•	•	•	•	•	•	•	•	9
Tuvalu	Not an OFC member							•	×	×	×	1

== Goalscorers ==
=== Overall top goalscorers ===
Players in bold are still active at international level.

Rank	Player	Team	Goals scored	Matches played	Goals per match	Tournament(s)
1	Damian Mori	Australia	14	10	1.40	3 (1996, 1998, 2002)
2	Kris Trajanovski	Australia	11	6	1.83	2 (1996, 1998)
3	Shane Smeltz	New Zealand	10	11	0.91	3 (2004, 2008, 2012)
3	Vaughan Coveny	New Zealand	10	11	0.91	3 (1996, 1998, 2004)
3	**Roy Krishna**	Fiji	10	17	0.59	4 (2008, 2012, 2016, 2024)
6	**Chris Wood**	New Zealand	9	8	1.13	2 (2012, 2016)
6	**Teaonui Tehau**	Tahiti	9	12	0.75	3 (2012, 2016, 2024)
8	Chris Killen	New Zealand	7	12	0.58	4 (2000, 2002, 2008, 2012)
8	Commins Menapi	Solomon Islands	7	14	0.50	3 (2000, 2002, 2004)
10	Jacques Haeko	New Caledonia	6	5	1.20	1 (2012)

== Hat-tricks ==
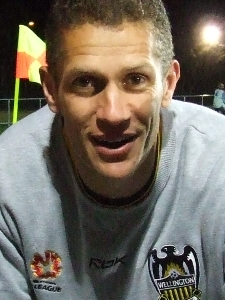
Vaughan Coveny of New Zealand is one of the players to score more than one hat-trick in OFC Nations Cup of the 1998 and 2004 addition.

A hat-trick is achieved when the same player scores three or more goals in one match. Listed in chronological order.

Key
^{4}	Player scored four goals in the match
^{5}	Player scored four goals in the match

Sequence	Player	No. of goals	Time of goals	Representing	Final score	Opponent	Tournament	Round	Date
1.	Eddie Krncevic	3	?', ?', ?'	Australia	8–0	New Caledonia	1980	Group stage	24 February 1980
2.	Ian Hunter	3	?', ?', ?'	Australia	11–2	Papua New Guinea	1980	Group stage	26 February 1980
3.	Peter Sharne^{4}	4	?', ?', ?', ?'	Australia	11–2	Papua New Guinea	1980	Group stage	26 February 1980
4.	Mark Armstrong	3	16', 65', 69'	New Zealand	6–1	Solomon Islands	1980	Group stage	29 February 1980
5.	Kris Trajanovski^{4}	4	25', 28', 44', 89'	Australia	6–0	Tahiti	1996	Final	27 October 1996
6.	Kris Trajanovski (II)	3	21', 36', 54'	Australia	5–0	Tahiti	1996	Final	1 November 1996
7.	Damian Mori	3	2', 25', 44'	Australia	3–1	Fiji	1998	Group stage	25 September 1998
8.	Vaughan Coveny	3	11', 25', 39', 40'	New Zealand	8–1	Vanuatu	1998	Group stage	28 September 1998
9.	Paul Trimboli	3	1', 12', 63'	Australia	16–0	Cook Islands	1998	Group stage	28 September 1998
10.	Damian Mori^{4} (II)	4	8', 15', 30', 34'	Australia	16–0	Cook Islands	1998	Group stage	28 September 1998
11.	Kris Trajanovski^{4} (III)	4	48', 68', 76 pen.', 88'	Australia	16–0	Cook Islands	1998	Group stage	28 September 1998
12.	Gerald Quennet	3	9', 10', 74'	Tahiti	5–1	Vanuatu	1998	Group stage	30 September 1998
13.	Damian Mori (III)	3	1', 32', 81'	Australia	4–1	Tahiti	1998	Semifinal	2 October 1998
14.	Paul Agostino	3	18', 53', 68'	Australia	17–0	Cook Islands	2000	Group stage	19 June 2000
15.	Craig Foster	4	30', 42', 51', 80'	Australia	17–0	Cook Islands	2000	Group stage	19 June 2000
16.	Clayton Zane	3	82', 87', 89'	Australia	17–0	Cook Islands	2000	Group stage	19 June 2000
17.	Chris Killen^{4}	4	9', 10', 28', 51'	New Zealand	9–1	Papua New Guinea	2002	Group stage	7 July 2002
18.	Bobby Despotovski^{4}	4	2', 56 pen.', 76', 77'	Australia	11–0	New Caledonia	2002	Group stage	8 July 2002
19.	Joel Porter^{4}	4	7', 12', 45', 52'	Australia	8–0	Fiji	2002	Group stage	10 July 2002
20.	Mile Sterjovski	3	51', 61', 74'	Australia	9–0	Tahiti	2004	Group stage	31 May 2004
21.	Tim Cahill	3	39', 66', 75'	Australia	6–1	Fiji	2004	Group stage	2 June 2004
22.	Vaughan Coveny (II)	3	6', 38', 45'	New Zealand	10–0	Tahiti	2004	Group stage	4 June 2004
23.	Brent Fisher	3	16', 22', 63'	New Zealand	10–0	Tahiti	2004	Group stage	4 June 2004
24.	Lorenzo Tehau^{4}	4	8', 82', 84', 85'	Tahiti	10–1	Samoa	2012	Group stage	1 June 2012
25.	Bertrand Kaï	3	32', 58', 76'	New Caledonia	5–2	Vanuatu	2012	Group stage	1 June 2012
26.	Jacques Haeko^{5}	5	11', 45+1', 71', 89', 90+1'	New Caledonia	9–0	Samoa	2012	Group stage	5 June 2012
27.	Chris Wood	3	10', 24', 29'	New Zealand	4–3	Solomon Islands	2012	Third place	10 June 2012
28.	Raymond Gunemba	3	33', 63', 85'	Papua New Guinea	8–0	Samoa	2016	Group stage	5 June 2016

=== By nation ===
Nation	Hat-tricks
Australia	17
New Zealand	6
Tahiti	2
New Caledonia	2
Papua New Guinea	1
