= New Zealand men's national football team results (2000–2019) =

This page details the match results and statistics of the New Zealand men's national football team from 2000 until 2019.

== Key ==
Key to matches

- Att. = Match attendance
- (H) = Home ground
- (A) = Away ground
- (N) = Neutral ground

Key to record by opponent

- Pld = Games played
- W = Games won
- D = Games drawn
- L = Games lost
- GF = Goals for
- GA = Goals against

== A-International results ==
New Zealand's score is shown first in each case.

No.	Date	Venue	Opponents	Score	Competition	New Zealand scorers	Att.	Ref.
259	14 January 2000	Tianhe Stadium, Guangzhou (A)	China	0–1	Guangzhou Four Nations' Tournament		20,000	
260	16 January 2000	Tianhe Stadium, Guangzhou (N)	Jamaica	1–2	Guangzhou Four Nations' Tournament	Elliott	—	
261	21 January 2000	North Harbour Stadium, Auckland (H)	South Korea	0–1	Friendly		12,000	
262	23 January 2000	Showgrounds, Palmerston North (H)	South Korea	0–0	Friendly		3,000	
263	19 June 2000	Stade Pater, Pirae (N)	Tahiti	2–0	2000 OFC Nations Cup	Bouckenooghe, Jackson	1,000	
264	21 June 2000	Stade Pater, Pirae (N)	Vanuatu	3–1	2000 OFC Nations Cup	Killen (2), Perry	500	
265	25 June 2000	Stade Pater, Pirae (N)	Solomon Islands	2–0	2000 OFC Nations Cup	Elliott (2)	500	
266	28 June 2000	Stade Pater, Pirae (N)	Australia	0–2	2000 OFC Nations Cup		1,000	
267	13 August 2000	Stadium Merdeka, Kuala Lumpur (A)	Malaysia	0–0	2000 Merdeka Tournament		—	
268	17 August 2000	Stadium Merdeka, Kuala Lumpur (N)	Oman	1–0	2000 Merdeka Tournament	Scott	—	
269	19 August 2000	Stadium Merdeka, Kuala Lumpur (A)	Malaysia	2–0	2000 Merdeka Tournament	Nelsen, Urlovic	12,000	
270	22 May 2001	Bishan Stadium, Singapore (A)	Singapore	0–3	Friendly		4,200	
271	6 June 2001	North Harbour Stadium, Auckland (H)	Tahiti	5–0	2002 FIFA World Cup qualification	Coveny (3), Lines, Perry	2,052	
272	8 June 2001	North Harbour Stadium, Auckland (H)	Cook Islands	2–0	2002 FIFA World Cup qualification	Hickey (2)	500	
273	11 June 2001	North Harbour Stadium, Auckland (H)	Solomon Islands	5–1	2002 FIFA World Cup qualification	Coveny (2), Jackson (2), Urlovic	2,500	
274	13 June 2001	North Harbour Stadium, Auckland (H)	Vanuatu	7–0	2002 FIFA World Cup qualification	Coveny (3), Jackson, Lines, Burton, Vicelich	1,500	
275	20 June 2001	Wellington Regional Stadium, Wellington (H)	Australia	0–2	2002 FIFA World Cup qualification		19,500	
276	24 June 2001	Stadium Australia, Sydney (A)	Australia	1–4	2002 FIFA World Cup qualification	Coveny	41,976	
277	5 July 2002	North Harbour Stadium, Auckland (N)	Tahiti	4–0	2002 OFC Nations Cup	Nelsen, Vicelich, Urlovic, Campbell	1,000	
278	7 July 2002	North Harbour Stadium, Auckland (N)	Papua New Guinea	9–1	2002 OFC Nations Cup	Killen (4), Campbell (2), Nelsen, Burton, De Gregorio	2,200	
279	9 July 2002	North Harbour Stadium, Auckland (N)	Solomon Islands	6–1	2002 OFC Nations Cup	Vicelich (2), Urlovic, Campbell (2), Burton	300	
280	12 July 2002	Mount Smart Stadium, Auckland (N)	Vanuatu	3–0	2002 OFC Nations Cup	Burton (2), Killen	1,000	
281	14 July 2002	Mount Smart Stadium, Auckland (N)	Australia	1–0	2002 OFC Nations Cup	Nelsen	4,000	
282	13 October 2002	Lilleküla Stadium, Tallinn (A)	Estonia	2–3	Friendly	Hickey, Lines	800	
283	16 October 2002	Miejski Stadion Sportowy "KSZO", Ostrowiec Świętokrzyski (A)	Poland	0–2	Friendly		8,000	
284	27 May 2003	Tynecastle Park, Edinburgh (A)	Scotland	1–1	Friendly	Nelsen	10,016	
285	8 June 2003	City Stadium, Richmond (A)	United States	1–2	Friendly	Coveny	9,116	
286	18 June 2003	Stade de France, Saint-Denis (N)	Japan	0–3	2003 FIFA Confederations Cup		36,038	
287	20 June 2003	Stade de Gerland, Lyon (N)	Colombia	1–3	2003 FIFA Confederations Cup	De Gregorio	22,811	
288	22 June 2003	Stade de France, Saint-Denis (N)	France	0–5	2003 FIFA Confederations Cup		36,842	
289	12 October 2003	Azadi Stadium, Tehran (A)	Iran	0–3	2003 AFC–OFC Challenge Cup		40,000	
290	29 May 2004	Hindmarsh Stadium, Adelaide (N)	Australia	0–1	2004 OFC Nations Cup		12,130	
291	31 May 2004	Marden Sports Complex, Adelaide (N)	Solomon Islands	3–0	2004 OFC Nations Cup	Fisher, Oughton, Lines	217	
292	2 June 2004	Hindmarsh Stadium, Adelaide (N)	Vanuatu	2–4	2004 OFC Nations Cup	Coveny (2)	356	
293	4 June 2004	Marden Sports Complex, Adelaide (N)	Tahiti	10–0	2004 OFC Nations Cup	Coveny (3), Fisher (3), Jones, Oughton, Nelsen (2)	200	
294	6 June 2004	Hindmarsh Stadium, Adelaide (N)	Fiji	2–0	2004 OFC Nations Cup	Bunce, Coveny	2,000	
295	9 June 2005	Craven Cottage, London (N)	Australia	0–1	Friendly		9,023	
296	19 February 2006	Queen Elizabeth II Park, Christchurch (H)	Malaysia	1–0	Friendly	Steven Old	10,100	
297	23 February 2006	North Harbour Stadium, Auckland (H)	Malaysia	2–1	Friendly	Banks, Barron	8,702	
298	25 April 2006	Estadio El Teniente, Rancagua (A)	Chile	1–4	Friendly	Smeltz	8,000	
299	27 April 2006	Estadio Municipal Nicolás Chahuán Nazar, La Calera (A)	Chile	0–1	Friendly		—	
300	24 May 2006	Szusza Ferenc Stadion, Budapest (A)	Hungary	0–2	Friendly		7,000	
301	27 May 2006	Stadion Altenkirchen, Altenkirchen (N)	Georgia	3–1	Friendly	Coveny (2), Killen	1,000	
302	31 May 2006	Lilleküla Stadium, Tallinn (A)	Estonia	1–1	Friendly	Hay	3,000	
303	4 June 2006	Stade de Genève, Geneva (N)	Brazil	0–4	Friendly		32,000	
304	24 March 2007	Estadio Ricardo Saprissa Aymá, San José (A)	Costa Rica	0–4	Friendly		15,000	
305	28 March 2007	Estadio José Pachencho Romero, Maracaibo (A)	Venezuela	0–5	Friendly		12,000	
306	26 May 2007	Racecourse Ground, Wrexham (A)	Wales	2–2	Friendly	Smeltz (2)	7,819	
307	17 October 2007	Churchill Park, Lautoka (A)	Fiji	2–0	2008 OFC Nations Cup	Vicelich, Smeltz	6,000	
308	17 November 2007	Port Vila Municipal Stadium, Port Vila (A)	Vanuatu	2–1	2008 OFC Nations Cup	Smeltz, Mulligan	8,000	
309	21 November 2007	Wellington Regional Stadium, Wellington (H)	Vanuatu	4–1	2008 OFC Nations Cup	Mulligan (2), Smeltz (2)	2,500	
310	6 September 2008	Stade Numa-Daly Magenta, Nouméa (A)	New Caledonia	3–1	2008 OFC Nations Cup	Sigmund, Smeltz (2)	2,589	
311	10 September 2008	North Harbour Stadium, Auckland (H)	New Caledonia	3–0	2008 OFC Nations Cup	Smeltz (2), Christie	8,000	
312	19 November 2008	Churchill Park, Lautoka (H)	Fiji	0–2	2008 OFC Nations Cup		4,500	
313	28 March 2009	Supachalasai Stadium, Bangkok (A)	Thailand	1–3	Friendly	Bright	—	
314	3 June 2009	National Stadium, Dar es Salaam (A)	Tanzania	1–2	Friendly	Smeltz	30,000	
315	6 June 2009	University of Botswana Stadium, Gaborone (A)	Botswana	0–0	Friendly		—	
316	10 June 2009	Super Stadium, Atteridgeville (N)	Italy	3–4	Friendly	Smeltz, Killen (2)	10,000	
317	14 June 2009	Royal Bafokeng Stadium, Rustenburg (N)	Spain	0–5	2009 FIFA Confederations Cup		21,649	
318	17 June 2009	Royal Bafokeng Stadium, Rustenburg (N)	South Africa	0–2	2009 FIFA Confederations Cup		36,598	
319	20 June 2009	Ellis Park Stadium, Johannesburg (N)	Iraq	0–0	2009 FIFA Confederations Cup		23,295	
320	9 September 2009	King Abdullah Stadium, Amman (A)	Jordan	3–1	Friendly	Smeltz (2), Fallon	—	
321	10 October 2009	Bahrain National Stadium, Riffa (A)	Bahrain	0–0	2010 FIFA World Cup qualification		37,000	
322	14 November 2009	Wellington Regional Stadium, Wellington (H)	Bahrain	1–0	2010 FIFA World Cup qualification	Fallon	35,194	
2010s	3 March 2010	Rose Bowl, Pasadena (N)	Mexico	0–2	Friendly		90,526	
324	24 May 2010	Melbourne Cricket Ground, Melbourne (A)	Australia	1–2	Friendly	Killen	55,659	
325	29 May 2010	Wörthersee Stadion, Klagenfurt (N)	Serbia	1–0	Friendly	Smeltz	14,000	
326	4 June 2010	Ljudski vrt, Maribor (A)	Slovenia	1–3	Friendly	Fallon	10,965	
327	15 June 2010	Royal Bafokeng Stadium, Rustenburg (N)	Slovakia	1–1	2010 FIFA World Cup	Reid	23,871	
328	20 June 2010	Mbombela Stadium, Nelspruit (N)	Italy	1–1	2010 FIFA World Cup	Smeltz	38,229	
329	24 June 2010	Peter Mokaba Stadium, Polokwane (N)	Paraguay	0–0	2010 FIFA World Cup		34,850	
330	9 October 2010	North Harbour Stadium, Auckland (H)	Honduras	1–1	Friendly	Wood	18,153	
331	12 October 2010	Wellington Regional Stadium, Wellington (H)	Paraguay	0–2	Friendly		16,477	
332	25 March 2011	Wuhan Sports Center, Wuhan (A)	China	1–1	Friendly	McGlinchey	—	
333	1 June 2011	Mile High Stadium, Denver (N)	Mexico	0–3	Friendly		45,401	
334	5 June 2011	Adelaide Oval, Adelaide (A)	Australia	0–3	Friendly		21,281	
335	29 February 2012	Mount Smart Stadium, Auckland (H)	Jamaica	2–3	Friendly	Wood, Killen	—	
336	23 May 2012	BBVA Stadium, Houston (N)	El Salvador	2–2	Friendly	Hogg, Barbarouses	—	
337	26 May 2012	Cotton Bowl, Dallas (N)	Honduras	1–0	Friendly	Smeltz	—	
338	2 June 2012	Lawson Tama Stadium, Honiara (N)	Fiji	1–0	2012 OFC Nations Cup	Smith	15,000	
339	4 June 2012	Lawson Tama Stadium, Honiara (N)	Papua New Guinea	2–1	2012 OFC Nations Cup	Smeltz, Wood	3,000	
340	6 June 2012	Lawson Tama Stadium, Honiara (N)	Solomon Islands	1–1	2012 OFC Nations Cup	Wood	18,000	
341	8 June 2012	Lawson Tama Stadium, Honiara (N)	New Caledonia	0–2	2012 OFC Nations Cup		10,000	
342	10 June 2012	Lawson Tama Stadium, Honiara (N)	Solomon Islands	4–3	2012 OFC Nations Cup	Wood (3), Smeltz	15,000	
343	7 September 2012	Stade Numa-Daly Magenta, Nouméa (A)	New Caledonia	2–0	2014 FIFA World Cup qualification	Smeltz, Wood	6,000	
344	11 September 2012	North Harbour Stadium, Auckland (H)	Solomon Islands	6–1	2014 FIFA World Cup qualification	Smeltz, Barbarouses, Killen, Lochhead, Wood, Rojas	7,931	
345	12 October 2012	Stade Pater Te Hono Nui, Pirae (A)	Tahiti	2–0	2014 FIFA World Cup qualification	Smeltz, Sigmund	600	
346	16 October 2012	Rugby League Park, Christchurch (H)	Tahiti	3–0	2014 FIFA World Cup qualification	McGlinchey (2), Killen	10,751	
347	14 November 2012	Hongkou Football Stadium, Shanghai (A)	China	1–1	Friendly	Wood	—	
348	22 March 2013	Forsyth Barr Stadium, Dunedin (H)	New Caledonia	2–1	2014 FIFA World Cup qualification	Killen, Smith	9,000	
349	26 March 2013	Lawson Tama Stadium, Honiara	Solomon Islands	2–0	2014 FIFA World Cup qualification	Payne (2)	5,600	
350	5 September 2013	King Fahd International Stadium, Riyadh (A)	Saudi Arabia	1–0	2013 OSN Cup	Killen	2,340	
351	9 September 2013	King Fahd International Stadium, Riyadh (N)	United Arab Emirates	0–2	2013 OSN Cup		—	
352	15 October 2013	Hasely Crawford Stadium, Port of Spain (A)	Trinidad and Tobago	0–0	Friendly		—	
353	13 November 2013	Estadio Azteca, Mexico City (A)	Mexico	1–5	2014 FIFA World Cup qualification	James	99,832	
354	20 November 2013	Wellington Regional Stadium, Wellington (H)	Mexico	2–4	2014 FIFA World Cup qualification	James, Fallon	35,206	
355	8 March 2014	National Stadium, Tokyo (A)	Japan	2–4	Friendly	Wood (2)	47,670	
356	30 May 2014	Mount Smart Stadium, Auckland (H)	South Africa	0–0	Friendly		9,266	
357	8 September 2014	Pakhtakor Markaziy Stadium, Tashkent (A)	Uzbekistan	1–3	Friendly	Brockie	—	
358	14 November 2014	Nanchang Bayi Stadium, Nanchang (A)	China	1–1	Friendly	Wood	—	
359	18 November 2014	80th Birthday Stadium, Nakhon Ratchasima (A)	Thailand	0–2	Friendly		—	
360	31 March 2015	Seoul World Cup Stadium, Seoul (A)	South Korea	0–1	Friendly		33,514	
361	7 September 2015	Thuwunna Stadium, Yangon (A)	Myanmar	1–1	Friendly	Smeltz	—	
362	12 November 2015	Al-Seeb Stadium, Seeb (A)	Oman	1–0	Friendly	Wood	—	
363	28 May 2016	Sir John Guise Stadium, Port Moresby (N)	Fiji	3–1	2016 OFC Nations Cup	Tzimopoulos, Fallon, Wood	378	
364	31 May 2016	Sir John Guise Stadium, Port Moresby (N)	Vanuatu	5–0	2016 OFC Nations Cup	Wood (2), McGlinchey, Fallon, Barbarouses	520	
365	4 June 2016	Sir John Guise Stadium, Port Moresby (N)	Solomon Islands	1–0	2016 OFC Nations Cup	Adams	1,925	
366	8 June 2016	Sir John Guise Stadium, Port Moresby (N)	New Caledonia	1–0	2016 OFC Nations Cup	Wood	1,379	
367	11 June 2016	Sir John Guise Stadium, Port Moresby (N)	Papua New Guinea	0–0 (4–2p)	2016 OFC Nations Cup		13,000	
368	8 October 2016	Nissan Stadium, Nashville (N)	Mexico	1–2	Friendly	Rojas	40,287	
369	11 October 2016	Robert F. Kennedy Memorial Stadium, Washington, D.C. (A)	United States	1–1	Friendly	Patterson	9,012	
370	12 November 2016	North Harbour Stadium, Auckland (H)	New Caledonia	2–0	2018 FIFA World Cup qualification	Rojas (2)	8,131	
371	15 November 2016	Stade Yoshida, Koné (A)	New Caledonia	0–0	2018 FIFA World Cup qualification		2,000	
372	25 March 2017	Churchill Park, Lautoka (A)	Fiji	2–0	2018 FIFA World Cup qualification	Rojas, Wood	7,000	
373	28 March 2017	Wellington Regional Stadium, Wellington (H)	Fiji	2–0	2018 FIFA World Cup qualification	Thomas (2)	10,133	
374	2 June 2017	Windsor Park, Belfast (A)	Northern Ireland	0–1	Friendly		16,815	
375	12 June 2017	Traktor Stadium, Minsk (A)	Belarus	0–1	Friendly		2,000	
376	17 June 2017	Krestovsky Stadium, Saint Petersburg (N)	Russia	0–2	2017 FIFA Confederations Cup		50,251	
377	21 June 2017	Fisht Olympic Stadium, Sochi (N)	Mexico	1–2	2017 FIFA Confederations Cup	Wood	25,133	
378	24 June 2017	Krestovsky Stadium, Saint Petersburg (N)	Portugal	0–4	2017 FIFA Confederations Cup		56,290	
379	1 September 2017	North Harbour Stadium, Auckland (H)	Solomon Islands	6–1	2018 FIFA World Cup qualification	Wood (3), Barbarouses, Thomas, McGlinchey	10,230	
380	5 September 2017	Lawson Tama Stadium, Honiara (A)	Solomon Islands	2–2	2018 FIFA World Cup qualification	Bevan, Aengari (o.g.)	10,200	
381	6 October 2017	Toyota Stadium, Toyota (A)	Japan	1–2	Kirin Challenge Cup	Wood	38,461	
382	11 November 2017	Wellington Regional Stadium, Wellington (H)	Peru	0–0	2018 FIFA World Cup qualification		37,034	
383	15 November 2017	Estadio Nacional del Perú, Lima (A)	Peru	0–2	2018 FIFA World Cup qualification		39,125	
384	24 March 2018	Pinatar Arena, San Pedro del Pinatar (N)	Canada	0–1	Friendly		0	
385	2 June 2018	Mumbai Football Arena, Mumbai (N)	Kenya	1–2	2018 Intercontinental Cup	Singh	—	
386	5 June 2018	Mumbai Football Arena, Mumbai (N)	Chinese Taipei	1–0	2018 Intercontinental Cup	Bevan	—	
387	7 June 2018	Mumbai Football Arena, Mumbai (N)	India	2–1	2018 Intercontinental Cup	De Jong, Dyer	—	
388	14 November 2019	Aviva Stadium, Dublin (A)	Republic of Ireland	1–3	Friendly	McCowatt	18,728	
389	17 November 2019	LFF Stadium, Vilnius (A)	Lithuania	0–1	Friendly		1,832	

Notes

1. A: New Zealand played four matches at the 2000 Merdeka Tournament, however only three were against full international sides. The other match against Malaysia U23 is considered an unofficial match.
2. B: The 2004 OFC Nations Cup doubled as the second round of qualifiers for the 2006 FIFA World Cup.
3. C: The 2008 OFC Nations Cup doubled as the second round of qualifiers for the 2010 FIFA World Cup.
4. D: The New Zealand-Fiji match was originally scheduled for 13 October 2007 but was postponed by FIFA after Fijian goalkeeper Simione Tamanisau was denied a visa by the New Zealand immigration authorities. The match was first rescheduled to be played in the neutral country of Samoa, but subsequently moved to Fiji.
5. E: The 2012 OFC Nations Cup doubled as the second round of qualifiers for the 2014 FIFA World Cup.
6. F: The 2016 OFC Nations Cup doubled as the second round of qualifiers for the 2018 FIFA World Cup.

== Streaks ==
- Most wins in a row
  - 5, 5 July 2002 – 14 July 2002
  - 5, 17 October 2007 – 10 September 2008
  - 5, 10 June 2012 – 16 October 2012
  - 5, 12 November 2015 – 8 June 2016
- Most matches without a loss
  - 9, 10 June 2012 – 5 September 2013
- Most draws in a row
  - 4, 15 June 2010 – 9 October 2010
- Most losses in a row
  - 7, 15 July 1999 – 21 January 2000
  - 6, 8 June 2003 – 29 May 2004
- Most matches without a win
  - 11, 5 June 2010 – 23 May 2012
  - 11, 9 September 2013 – 7 September 2015

== Results by opposition ==
Team	Pld	W	D	L	GF	GA	GD	WPCT
Australia	8	1	0	7	3	15	−12	12.50
Bahrain	2	1	1	0	1	0	+1	50.00
Belarus	1	0	0	1	0	1	−1	0.00
Botswana	1	0	1	0	0	0	0	0.00
Brazil	1	0	0	1	0	4	−4	0.00
Canada	1	0	0	1	0	1	−1	0.00
Chile	2	0	0	2	1	5	−4	0.00
China	4	0	3	1	3	4	−1	0.00
Chinese Taipei	1	1	0	0	1	0	+1	100.00
Colombia	1	0	0	1	1	3	−2	0.00
Cook Islands	1	1	0	0	2	0	+2	100.00
Costa Rica	1	0	0	1	0	4	−4	0.00
El Salvador	1	0	1	0	2	2	0	0.00
Estonia	2	0	1	1	3	4	−1	0.00
Fiji	7	6	0	1	12	3	+9	85.71
France	1	0	0	1	0	5	−5	0.00
Georgia	1	1	0	0	3	1	+2	100.00
Hungary	1	0	0	1	0	2	−2	0.00
Honduras	2	1	1	0	2	1	+1	50.00
India	1	1	0	0	2	1	+1	100.00
Iran	1	0	0	1	0	3	−3	0.00
Iraq	1	0	1	0	0	0	0	0.00
Italy	2	0	1	1	4	5	−1	0.00
Jamaica	2	0	0	2	3	5	−2	0.00
Japan	3	0	0	3	3	9	−6	0.00
Jordan	1	1	0	0	3	1	+2	100.00
Kenya	1	0	0	1	1	2	−1	0.00
Lithuania	1	0	0	1	0	1	−1	0.00
Malaysia	4	3	1	0	5	1	+4	75.00
Mexico	6	0	0	6	5	18	−13	0.00
Myanmar	1	0	1	0	1	1	0	0.00
New Caledonia	8	6	1	1	13	4	+9	75.00
Northern Ireland	1	0	0	1	0	1	−1	0.00
Oman	2	2	0	0	2	0	+2	100.00
Paraguay	2	0	1	1	0	2	−2	0.00
Papua New Guinea	3	2	1	0	11	2	+9	66.67
Peru	2	0	1	1	0	2	−2	0.00
Poland	1	0	0	1	0	2	−2	0.00
Portugal	1	0	0	1	0	4	−4	0.00
Republic of Ireland	1	0	0	1	1	3	−2	0.00
Russia	1	0	0	1	0	2	−2	0.00
Saudi Arabia	1	1	0	0	1	0	+1	100.00
Scotland	1	0	1	0	1	1	0	0.00
Serbia	1	1	0	0	1	0	+1	100.00
Singapore	1	0	0	1	0	3	−3	0.00
Slovakia	1	0	1	0	1	1	0	0.00
Slovenia	1	0	0	1	1	3	−2	0.00
Solomon Islands	11	9	2	0	38	10	+28	81.82
South Africa	2	0	1	1	0	2	−2	0.00
South Korea	3	0	1	2	0	2	−2	0.00
Spain	1	0	0	1	0	5	−5	0.00
Tahiti	6	6	0	0	26	0	+26	100.00
Tanzania	1	0	0	1	1	2	−1	0.00
Thailand	2	0	0	2	1	5	−4	0.00
Trinidad and Tobago	1	0	1	0	0	0	0	0.00
United Arab Emirates	1	0	0	1	0	2	−2	0.00
United States	2	0	1	1	2	3	−1	0.00
Uzbekistan	1	0	0	1	1	3	−2	0.00
Vanuatu	7	6	0	1	27	7	+20	85.71
Venezuela	1	0	0	1	0	5	−5	0.00
Wales	1	0	1	0	2	2	0	0.00
Total	131	50	25	56	191	180	+11	38.17

Source: A-International results

== Results by year ==
Per Year
Year	Pld	W	D	L	GF	GA	GD
2000	11	5	2	4	11	7	+4
2001	7	4	0	3	20	10	+10
2002	7	5	0	2	25	7	+18
2003	6	0	1	5	3	17	–14
2004	5	3	0	2	17	5	+12
2005	1	0	0	1	0	1	–1
2006	8	3	1	4	8	14	–6
2007	6	3	1	2	10	13	–3
2008	3	2	0	1	6	3	+3
2009	10	2	3	5	9	17	–8
2010	9	1	4	4	6	12	–6
2011	3	0	1	2	1	7	–6
2012	13	8	3	2	27	14	+13
2013	7	3	1	3	8	12	–4
2014	5	0	2	3	4	10	–6
2015	3	1	1	1	2	2	0
2016	9	5	3	1	14	4	+10
2017	12	3	2	7	14	17	–3
2018	4	2	0	2	4	4	0
2019	2	0	0	2	1	4	–3

Cumulative*
Year	Pld	W	D	L	GF	GA	GD
2000	269	114	47	108	498	425	+73
2001	276	118	47	111	518	435	+83
2002	283	123	47	113	543	442	+101
2003	289	123	48	118	546	459	+87
2004	294	126	48	120	563	464	+99
2005	295	126	48	121	563	465	+98
2006	303	129	49	125	571	479	+92
2007	309	132	50	127	581	492	+89
2008	312	134	50	128	587	495	+92
2009	322	136	53	133	596	512	+84
2010	331	137	57	137	602	524	+78
2011	334	137	58	139	603	531	+72
2012	347	145	61	141	630	545	+85
2013	354	148	62	144	638	557	+81
2014	359	148	64	147	642	567	+75
2015	362	149	65	148	644	569	+75
2016	371	154	68	149	658	573	+85
2017	383	157	70	156	672	590	+82
2018	387	159	70	158	676	594	+82
2019	389	159	70	160	677	598	+79

- Cumulative table includes all results prior to 2000.

== See also ==
- New Zealand national football team
- New Zealand at the FIFA World Cup
- New Zealand at the FIFA Confederations Cup
- New Zealand at the OFC Nations Cup
