= 1998 OFC Nations Cup final =

- Event: 1998 OFC Nations Cup
Australia	New Zealand
(Australia)	(New Zealand)
0	1
- Date: 4 October 1998
- Venue: Suncorp Stadium, Brisbane
- Referee: Massimo Raveino (Tahiti)
- Attendance: 12,000

The 1998 OFC Nations Cup final was an association football match that took place on the 4 September 1998 at Suncorp Stadium, Brisbane. It was the final of the 1998 OFC Nations Cup which was the fourth edition of the OFC Nations Cup, a competition for national teams in the Oceania Football Confederation.

It was contested between hosts Australia and New Zealand. It was Australia's third final appearance with the team winning the last two OFC Nations Cup in 1980 and 1996. For New Zealand, it was their second appearance in a final appearance after winning the 1973. In the group stage, both Australia and New Zealand finished top of their groups with six points with the semi-finals seeing New Zealand defeat Fiji 1–0 while Australia defeated Tahiti 4–1.

Mark Burton scored the game's only goal in the 24th minute to give New Zealand a 1-0 win and their second Nations Cup title. This meant that New Zealand won the right to play in the 1999 FIFA Confederations Cup (held in Mexico) as the representative from the OFC.

== Background ==
Heading into the 1998 final, Australia was playing in the third consecutive final after winning the previous two tournaments (1980 and 1996) both being over Tahiti. New Zealand was playing their second final with their other final appearance being in 1973 where they defeated Tahiti in the final.

The two teams had met in official FIFA matches 16 times prior to the final of the OFC Nations Cup. Their most recent encounter being a two-legs match in qualification for the 1998 FIFA World Cup with Australia winning 5–0 on aggregate. In Oceania, they had met twice with Australia winning the last encounter in Newcastle 3–0.

== Road to the final ==
Australia
Round
New Zealand
Opponent
Result
Group stage
Opponent
Result
Fiji
3–1
Match 1
Tahiti
1–0
Cook Islands
16–0
Match 2
Vanuatu
8–1
Group B winner

Team	Pld	W	D	L	GF	GA	GD	Pts
Australia	2	2	0	0	19	1	+18	6
Fiji	2	1	0	1	4	3	+1	3
Cook Islands	2	0	0	2	0	19	−19	0

Final standings
Group A winner

Team	Pld	W	D	L	GF	GA	GD	Pts
New Zealand	2	2	0	0	9	1	+8	6
Tahiti	2	1	0	1	5	2	+3	3
Vanuatu	2	0	0	2	2	13	−11	0

Opponent
Result
Knockout stage
Opponent
Result
Tahiti
4–1
Semi-finals
Fiji
1–0

=== Australia ===
Australia was drawn in Group B with Fiji and debutants Cook Islands. In the first match against Fiji, five Australians made their first appearance in the Australians colours. A first-half hat-trick from Damian Mori secured the victory for the Australians despite conceding a goal in the 63rd minute from Esala Masi. The following match against the Cook Islands saw the smallest home crowd in Australia with only 400 people attending the match. Hat-tricks from Damian Mori (4 goals), Kris Trajanovski (4 goals) and Paul Trimboli aided in Australia defeating the Cook Islands 16–0. The score fell one short of the world record secured by Iran who defeated the Maldives in qualification for the 1998 FIFA World Cup. But it did eclipse a national record set a year prior against the Solomon Islands.

In the semi-finals, they took on Tahiti who had finished second in Group A. Another hat-trick from Damian Mori brought his tally up to 10 goals for the tournament while a late goal from Carl Veart sealed the victory and a spot in the final. It was also during this match that Alex Tobin broke the record for the most international appearances by an Australian as he passed Paul Wade record of 84 caps.

=== New Zealand ===
New Zealand was drawn in Group A with Tahiti and Vanuatu. In the opening match against Tahiti, a single goal was the difference with the goal coming off Heimana Paama after being saved by the keeper in the 13th minute of play. The following match against Vanuatu saw a hat-trick from South Melbourne FC player, Vaughan Coveny as he scored four goals in the 8–1 victory over Vanuatu with Rubert Ryan also scoring a double for New Zealand.

After topping the group, New Zealand met Fiji in the semi-finals and it took until the 88th minute before New Zealand finally scored a goal off Danny Hay before New Zealand got the lead in the match as they went on to win the match 1–0 and book a spot into the final.

== Match ==
=== Details ===
1998 OFC Nations Cup Final
4 October 1998

Australia	0–1	New Zealand
	Report	M. Burton 24'

Suncorp Stadium, Brisbane
Attendance: 12,000
Referee: Massimo Raveino (Tahiti)

Australia	New Zealand

GK	1	Jason Petkovic
RB	5	Alex Tobin (c)		(substituted off) 60'
CB	6	Mark Babic
CB	12	Simon Colosimo	Booked
LB	13	Alvin Ceccoli
RM	16	Kasey Wehrman	Booked
CM	14	Goran Lozanovski		(substituted off) 46'
CM	8	Troy Halpin		(substituted off) 62'
LM	19	Brad Maloney
CF	10	Paul Trimboli
CF	9	Damian Mori
Substitutions:
MF	20	Scott Chipperfield		(substituted on) 46'
DF	15	Dominic Longo		(substituted on) 60'
FW	17	Kris Trajanovski		(substituted on) 62' (yellow card) 90'
Manager:
(Australia) Raul Blanco

GK	1	Jason Batty (c)
RB	2	Chris Zoricich	Booked
CB	3	Sean Douglas		(substituted off) 90'	Booked
CB	6	Gavin Wilkinson
LB	14	Danny Hay
DM	12	Mark Atkinson
RM	11	Harry Ngata		(substituted off) 79'
CM	10	Chris Jackson	Booked
CM	8	Aaran Lines	Booked
CM	7	Mark Burton
CF	16	Vaughan Coveny
Substitutions:
DF	4	Che Bunce		(substituted on) 79'
DF	15	Ivan Vicelich		(substituted on) 90'
Manager:
(England) Ken Dugdale

== See also ==
- Australia–New Zealand soccer rivalry
