= 2002 Australia national soccer team season =

Australia
2002 season
- Manager: Frank Farina

This page summarises the Australia national soccer team fixtures and results in 2002.

== Summary ==
Australia's only games in 2002 was when competing in the 2002 OFC Nations Cup in New Zealand. Other than Scott Chipperfield, Australia sent a squad made up of NSL based players. They won their group matches against Vanuatu, New Caledonia and Fiji without conceding a goal. In the semi-final Tahiti scored in the 38th minute and it wasn't until the 88th minute that Mehmet Duraković scored Australia's equaliser to take the game to extra-time. In the 96th minute Damian Mori scored the golden-goal winner for Australia to send them through to the final against the hosts New Zealand. New Zealand won the final 1–0 to secure their third OFC Nations Cup title and qualification to the 2003 FIFA Confederations Cup as representatives of Oceania.

== Record ==
Type	GP	W	D	L	GF	GA
OFC Nations Cup	5	4	0	1	23	2
Total	5	4	0	1	23	2

== Match results ==
=== Oceania Nations Cup ===
6 July 2002 Group Stage	Vanuatu	0–2	Australia	Auckland, New Zealand
			69' Mori; 85' Despotovski	Stadium: Ericsson Stadium; Attendance: 1,000; Referee: (French Polynesia) Charles Ariiotima

8 July 2002 Group Stage	New Caledonia	0–11	Australia	Auckland, New Zealand
			3', pen 55', 75', 77' Despotovski; 14' Horvat; 21', 35' Chipperfield; 34' Mori; 82' Costanzo; 86' Porter; 90+1' Trimboli	Stadium: Ericsson Stadium; Attendance: 200; Referee: (New Zealand) Derek Rugg

10 July 2002 Group Stage	Fiji	0–8	Australia	Auckland, New Zealand
			5' Milicic; 8', 13', 44', 53' Porter; 36' Juric; 47' Trimboli; 89' De Amicis	Stadium: Ericsson Stadium; Attendance: 1,000; Referee: (Papua New Guinea) Joakim Sosongan

12 July 2002 Semi Final	Tahiti	1–2 (a.e.t.)	Australia	Auckland, New Zealand
	Zaveroni 38'	Report	88' Durakovic; 96' Mori	Stadium: Ericsson Stadium; Attendance: 1,000; Referee: (New Zealand) Derek Rugg

14 July 2002 Final	New Zealand	1–0	Australia	Auckland, New Zealand
	Nelsen 78'			Stadium: Ericsson Stadium; Attendance: 3,000; Referee: (French Polynesia) Charles Ariiotima

== Goal scorers ==
Player	Goals
Despotovski	5
Porter	5
Mori	3
Chipperfield	2
Trimboli	2
Horvat	1
De Amicis	1
Durakovic	1
Costanzo	1
Juric	1
Milicic	1
