= 2000 OFC Nations Cup final =

- Event: 2000 OFC Nations Cup
Australia	New Zealand
(Australia)	(New Zealand)
2	0
- Date: 28 June 2000
- Venue: Stade Pater, Papeete
- Referee: Harry Attison

The 2000 OFC Nations Cup final was an association football match that took place on 28 June 2000 at the Stade Pater, Papeete. It was the final of the 2000 OFC Nations Cup which was the fifth edition of the OFC Nations Cup, an international competition for national teams in the Oceania Football Confederation.

It was contested between Australia and New Zealand in what was a repeat of the 1998 final which New Zealand won. This was also New Zealand's third appearance in a continental final after also appearing in the 1973 final which they won. For Australia, this was their fourth appearance in the final with Australia also winning the 1980 and 1996. After both teams won their respective groups, Australia defeated Vanuatu while New Zealand defeated the Solomon Islands.

In the final, goals from Shaun Murphy and Craig Foster gave Australia a 2–0 win over New Zealand to record their third OFC title. This also meant that as winners of the Nations Cup, they also qualified for the 2001 FIFA Confederations Cup which was held in South Korea and Japan as representative of the OFC.

== Route to the final ==
Australia
Round
New Zealand
Opponent
Result
Group stage
Opponent
Result
Cook Islands
17–0
Match 1
Tahiti
2–0
Solomon Islands
6–0
Match 2
Vanuatu
3–1
Group A winner

Team	Pld	W	D	L	GF	GA	GD	Pts
Australia	2	2	0	0	23	0	+23	6
Solomon Islands	2	1	0	1	5	7	−2	3
Cook Islands	2	0	0	2	1	22	−21	0

Final standings
Group B winner

Team	Pld	W	D	L	GF	GA	GD	Pts
New Zealand	2	2	0	0	5	1	+4	6
Vanuatu	2	1	0	1	4	5	−1	3
Tahiti	2	0	0	2	2	5	−3	0

Opponent
Result
Knockout stage
Opponent
Result
Vanuatu
1–0
Semi-finals
Solomon Islands
2–0

=== Australia ===
As finalists in the 1998 OFC Nations Cup, and the OFC's top-ranked side, the "Socceroos" were given entry straight into the tournament finals. They progressed comfortably through the group stage, accounting for Cook Islands and Solomon Islands comfortably 17–0 and 6–0 respectively. In the semi-final, they played Vanuatu, winning 1–0 in a match that was closer than expected. Australia's Clayton Zane was the tournament's top scorer going into the final, with 5 goals.

=== New Zealand ===
Like Australia, New Zealand were given direct entry into the tournament finals, as 1998 OFC Nations Cup champions and the OFC's second ranked side. They beat both Tahiti and Vanuatu by 2 goals to progress from the group stage. In the semi-finals, they played Solomon Islands and won 2–0 to move through to the final.

== Pre-match ==
=== Analysis ===
Despite New Zealand having won the 1998 OFC Nations Cup final, Australia went into the game as favourites, ranked 15 spots ahead of New Zealand in FIFA World Rankings.

== Match ==
=== First half ===
Australia was the better side for much of the match, although New Zealand did create some chances. Australia took the lead 5 minutes from half time, as Shaun Murphy scored off a Stan Lazaridis corner.

=== Second half ===
Australia's ascendency continued, and when Danny Tiatto's cross was finished by Craig Foster midway through the second half, the result was all but secured for Australia.

=== Match details ===
28 June 2000
18:00

Australia	2–0	New Zealand
Shaun Murphy 40'; Craig Foster 66'	Report

Stade Pater, Papeete
Attendance: 300
Referee: Harry Attison

Australia	New Zealand

AUSTRALIA:
GK	1	Zeljko Kalac
RB	2	Kevin Muscat
CB	3	Shaun Murphy	40'
CB	5	Tony Popovic
LB	7	Danny Tiatto
RM	8	Stan Lazaridis
CM	4	Paul Okon
CM	6	Craig Foster	66'	(substituted off) 80'
LM	13	Brett Emerton
CF	9	David Zdrillic
CF	11	Paul Agostino		(substituted off) 80'
Substitutes:
MF	14	Aurelio Vidmar		(substituted on) 80'
FW	15	Clayton Zane		(substituted on) 80'
Manager:
Frank Farina

NEW ZEALAND:
GK	1	Jason Batty
CB	2	Che Bunce
CB	3	Sean Douglas
CB	5	Jonathan Perry
RWB	6	Gavin Wilkinson	(yellow card) 27'	(substituted off) 70'
LWB	18	Scott Smith
CM	7	Simon Elliott
CM	10	Chris Jackson
CM	12	Mark Atkinson		(substituted off) 77'
CF	8	Chris Killen
CF	13	Kris Bouckenooghe
Substitutes:
MF	16	Raf de Gregorio		(substituted on) 70'
FW	9	Paul Urlovic		(substituted on) 77'
Manager:
Ken Dugdale

== Post-match ==
Australia's win qualified them for the 2001 FIFA Confederations Cup, and was their third OFC Nations Cup win and their first since 1996.

== See also ==
- Australia–New Zealand soccer rivalry
