= Steve Fatupua-Lecaill =

Tahitian footballer (1976-2003)

Personal information
- Date of birth: January 12, 1976
- Place of birth: Tahiti, French Polynesia
- Date of death: September 27, 2003 (aged 27)
- Position: Defender

Youth career
- ?

Senior career*
Years	Team	Apps	(Gls)
1996–2003	AS Vénus	?	(?)

International career
1997–2003	Tahiti	17	(3)
Medal record
Men's football
Representing Tahiti
OFC Nations Cup
Third place	2002 New Zealand
- * Club domestic league appearances and goals

Steve Fatupua-Lecaill (January 12, 1976 – September 27, 2003) was a Tahitian footballer. He has played for AS Vénus and Tahiti national football team.

== Honours ==
Tahiti

- OFC Nations Cup: 3rd place 2002
