= 2020 OFC Nations Cup =

Tournament details
- Host country: New Zealand
- Dates: Cancelled (originally 6–20 June)
- Teams: 8 (from 1 confederation)
- Venues: 2 (expected) (in 1 host city)

The 2020 OFC Nations Cup was originally to be the 11th edition of the OFC Nations Cup, the quadrennial international men's football championship of Oceania organised by the Oceania Football Confederation (OFC) scheduled for 6 to 20 June 2020.

The tournament was originally to be hosted by New Zealand, whose bid was chosen by the OFC on 10 January 2020. A total of eight teams would compete in the final tournament. New Zealand were the defending champions.

On 21 April 2020, OFC announced that due to the COVID-19 pandemic and the difficulty in rescheduling to another date in the FIFA International Match Calendar, the tournament would be cancelled.

== Qualification ==
All 11 FIFA-affiliated national teams from OFC were eligible to enter the tournament.

A qualification round was originally scheduled to be played by four teams between 21 and 27 March 2020 at the CIFA Academy Field in Rarotonga, Cook Islands, where the winners would join the seven automatic qualifiers in the final tournament. However, the OFC announced on 9 March 2020 that all OFC tournaments were postponed until 6 May 2020 in response to the COVID-19 pandemic, before the tournament was cancelled.

== Cancellation ==
On 9 March 2020, the OFC postponed all competitions until at least May in response to the growing COVID-19 outbreak.

On 21 April 2020, the OFC Executive Committee announced the cancellation of the Nations Cup. The confederation cited international travel restrictions, varying public health measures across Oceania, and the inability to find a suitable alternative date within the FIFA International Match Calendar. Instead of rescheduling the tournament, the OFC prioritized preparations for FIFA World Cup qualification.

Teams which were originally to directly qualify for final tournament
Team	Finals appearance (planned)	Previous best performance
Fiji	9th	Third Place (1998 & 2008)
New Caledonia	7th	Runner-up (2008 & 2012)
New Zealand (Hosts & Holders)	11th	Winner (1973, 1998, 2002, 2008 & 2016)
Papua New Guinea	5th	Runner-up (2016)
Solomon Islands	8th	Runner-up (2004)
Tahiti	10th	Winner (2012)
Vanuatu	10th	Fourth Place (1973, 2000, 2002 & 2008)

Teams which were originally to enter qualifying
Team	Finals appearance (planned if qualified)	Previous best performance
American Samoa	1st	None
Cook Islands (Qualifying Hosts)	3rd	Sixth Place (1998 & 2000)
Samoa	3rd	Eighth Place (2012 & 2016)
Tonga	1st	None

== Venues ==
The tournament was expected to be held in Auckland, with North Harbour Stadium and The Trusts Arena the likely venues.

2020 OFC Nations Cup is located in New Zealand
2020 OFC Nations Cup is located in New Zealand	Auckland	
2020 OFC Nations Cup is located in New Zealand	North Harbour Stadium	The Trusts Arena
2020 OFC Nations Cup is located in New Zealand	Capacity: 25,000	Capacity: 3,000
