= List of Africa Cup of Nations finals =

Africa Cup of Nations final
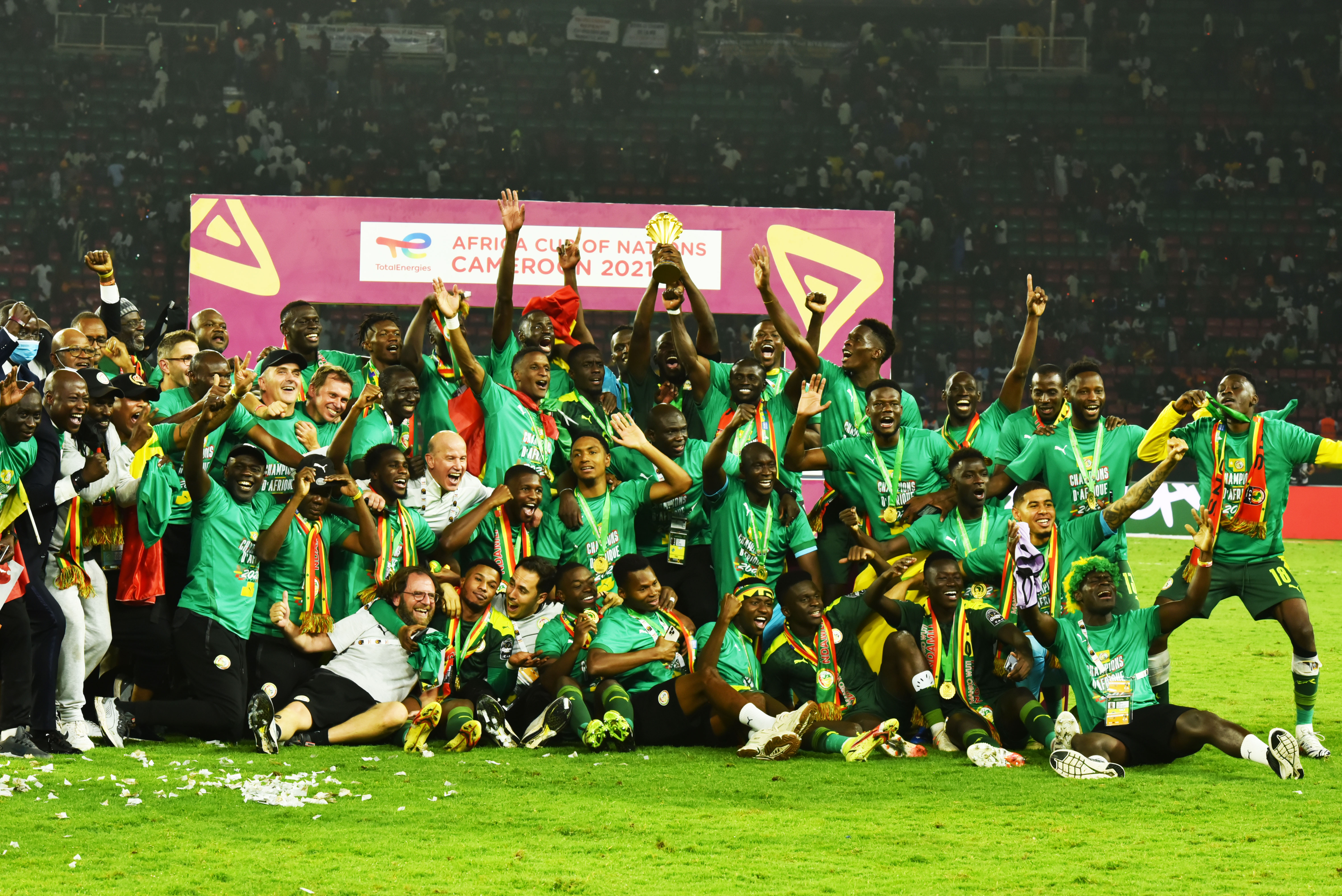
- Senegal, champions of the 2021 Africa Cup of Nations
- Organiser(s): CAF
- Founded: 1957; 69 years ago
- Region: Africa
- Current champions: Morocco (2nd title) (Note: The 2025 final originally finished 1–0 for Senegal after extra time. On 17 March 2026, the CAF Appeal Board ruled that Senegal had forfeited the match for temporarily refusing to play and leaving the pitch in protest of a refereeing decision. Pursuant to articles 82 and 84 of the competition regulations, the final was awarded as a 3–0 win for Morocco, thereby retroactively declaring them as 2025 Africa Cup of Nations champions and stripping Senegal of the title.)
- Most championships: Egypt (7 titles)

The Africa Cup of Nations is a football competition established in 1957. It is contested by the men's national teams of members of the Confederation of African Football (CAF), the African governing body for the sport, and is held every two years. The winner of the first final was Egypt, who defeated Ethiopia 4–0 in Khartoum after extra time. The most recent final was played in Rabat in January 2026; Morocco won the match by forfeiture after Senegal's national team had decided to abandon the match during regular time.

The Africa Cup of Nations final is the last match of the competition, and the result determines which team declared African champions. As of the 2025 edition, if the score is tied after 90 minutes of regular play, an additional 30-minute period of play, called extra time, is added. If such a match remains tied after extra time, it is decided by a penalty shoot-out. The team that wins the penalty shoot-out is then declared the champions.

The 34 finals (Note: There was no official Africa Cup of Nations final match in 1959. The tournament winner was decided by a final round-robin group contested by three teams (United Arab Republic, Sudan, and Ethiopia). Coincidentally, the last match of the tournament pitted the two top ranked teams against each other, with United Arab Republic's 2–1 victory over Sudan thus often being considered the de facto final of the 1959 Africa Cup of Nations.) to-date have produced thirteen drawn matches, the eventual winners of which have been determined variously by replay (1974), extra time (1962, 1965, 2025), or penalty shoot-out (1982, 1986, 1992, 2000, 2002, 2006, 2012, 2015, 2021). Egypt is the most successful team in the history of the tournament, winning seven times.

== List of finals ==
Key to the list
| a.e.t. | Result after extra time |
| pen. | Match was won on a penalty shoot-out |
| re. | Match was won after a replay |

List of finals of the Africa Cup of Nations
| Tournament | Winners | Score | Runners-up | Venue | Location | Attendance | Ref. |
|---|---|---|---|---|---|---|---|
| 1957 | Egypt | 4–0 | Ethiopia | Municipal Stadium | Khartoum, Sudan | 30,000 | |
| 1959 | United Arab Republic | 2–1 | Sudan | Prince Farouk Stadium | Cairo, Egypt | 30,000 | |
| 1962 | Ethiopia | 4–2 (a.e.t.) | United Arab Republic | Hailé Sélassié Stadium | Addis Ababa, Ethiopia | 30,000 | |
| 1963 | Ghana | 3–0 | Sudan | Accra Sports Stadium | Accra, Ghana | | |
| 1965 | Ghana | 3–2 (a.e.t.) | Tunisia | Chedly Zouiten Stadium | Tunis, Tunisia | 16,000 | |
| 1968 | DR Congo | 1–0 | Ghana | Hailé Sélassié Stadium | Addis Ababa, Ethiopia | 25,000 | |
| 1970 | Sudan | 1–0 | Ghana | Municipal Stadium | Khartoum, Sudan | 12,187 | |
| 1972 | PR Congo | 3–2 | Mali | Stade Omnisports | Yaoundé, Cameroon | 40,000 | |
| 1974 | Zaire | 2–2 (a.e.t.); 2–0 (re.) | Zambia | Nasser Stadium | Cairo, Egypt | 55,000; 1,000 (re.) | |
| 1976 | Morocco | 1–1 (Note: There was no official African Cup of Nations final match in 1976. The tournament winner was decided by a final round-robin group contested by four teams (Morocco, Guinea, Nigeria, and Egypt). Coincidentally, one of the last two matches of the tournament pitted the two top ranked teams against each other, with Morocco's 1–1 draw with Guinea thus often being considered the de facto final of the 1976 African Cup of Nations. Likewise, the game between the lowest ranked teams, played on the same day as Morocco vs Guinea, can be considered equal to a 3rd place match, with Nigeria's 3–2 victory over Egypt ensuring that they finished third.) | Guinea | Addis Ababa Stadium | Addis Ababa, Ethiopia | 30,000 | |
| 1978 | Ghana | 2–0 | Uganda | Accra Sports Stadium | Accra, Ghana | 80,000 | |
| 1980 | Nigeria | 3–0 | Algeria | Surulere Stadium | Lagos, Nigeria | 85,000 | |
| 1982 | Ghana | 1–1 (a.e.t.) (7–6 p) | Libya | June 11 Stadium | Tripoli, Libya | 80,000 | |
| 1984 | Cameroon | 3–1 | Nigeria | Felix Houphouet Boigny Stadium | Abidjan, Ivory Coast | 27,456 | |
| 1986 | Egypt | 0–0 (a.e.t.) (5–4 p) | Cameroon | Cairo International Stadium | Cairo, Egypt | 95,000 | |
| 1988 | Cameroon | 1–0 | Nigeria | Stade Mohammed V | Casablanca, Morocco | 60,000 | |
| 1990 | Algeria | 1–0 | Nigeria | Stade du 5 Juillet | Algiers, Algeria | 105,032 | |
| 1992 | Ivory Coast | 0–0 (a.e.t.) (11–10 p) | Ghana | Stade de l'Amitié | Dakar, Senegal | 47,500 | |
| 1994 | Nigeria | 2–1 | Zambia | El Menzah Stadium | Tunis, Tunisia | 25,000 | |
| 1996 | South Africa | 2–0 | Tunisia | FNB Stadium | Johannesburg, South Africa | 80,000 | |
| 1998 | Egypt | 2–0 | South Africa | Stade du 4 Août | Ouagadougou, Burkina Faso | 40,000 | |
| 2000 | Cameroon | 2–2 (a.e.t.) (4–3 p) | Nigeria | National Stadium | Lagos, Nigeria | 60,000 | |
| 2002 | Cameroon | 0–0 (a.e.t.) (3–2 p) | Senegal | Stade du 26 Mars | Bamako, Mali | 50,000 | |
| 2004 | Tunisia | 2–1 | Morocco | 7 November Stadium | Radès, Tunisia | 60,000 | |
| 2006 | Egypt | 0–0 (a.e.t.) (4–2 p) | Ivory Coast | Cairo International Stadium | Cairo, Egypt | 74,100 | |
| 2008 | Egypt | 1–0 | Cameroon | Ohene Djan Stadium | Accra, Ghana | 50,000 | |
| 2010 | Egypt | 1–0 | Ghana | Estádio 11 de Novembro | Luanda, Angola | 50,000 | |
| 2012 | Zambia | 0–0 (a.e.t.) (8–7 p) | Ivory Coast | Stade d'Angondjé | Libreville, Gabon | 40,000 | |
| 2013 | Nigeria | 1–0 | Burkina Faso | FNB Stadium | Johannesburg, South Africa | 85,000 | |
| 2015 | Ivory Coast | 0–0 (a.e.t.) (9–8 p) | Ghana | Estadio de Bata | Bata, Equatorial Guinea | 32,857 | |
| 2017 | Cameroon | 2–1 | Egypt | Stade de l'Amitié | Libreville, Gabon | 38,250 | |
| 2019 | Algeria | 1–0 | Senegal | Cairo International Stadium | Cairo, Egypt | 75,000 | |
| 2021 | Senegal | 0–0 (a.e.t.) (4–2 p) | Egypt | Olembe Stadium | Yaoundé, Cameroon | 48,000 | |
| 2023 | Ivory Coast | 2–1 | Nigeria | Alassane Ouattara Stadium | Abidjan, Ivory Coast | 57,094 | |
| 2025 | Morocco | 3–0 (awd.) | Senegal | Prince Moulay Abdellah Stadium | Rabat, Morocco | 66,526 | |

== Results by nation ==
Years shown in bold indicate that the country also hosted that tournament.

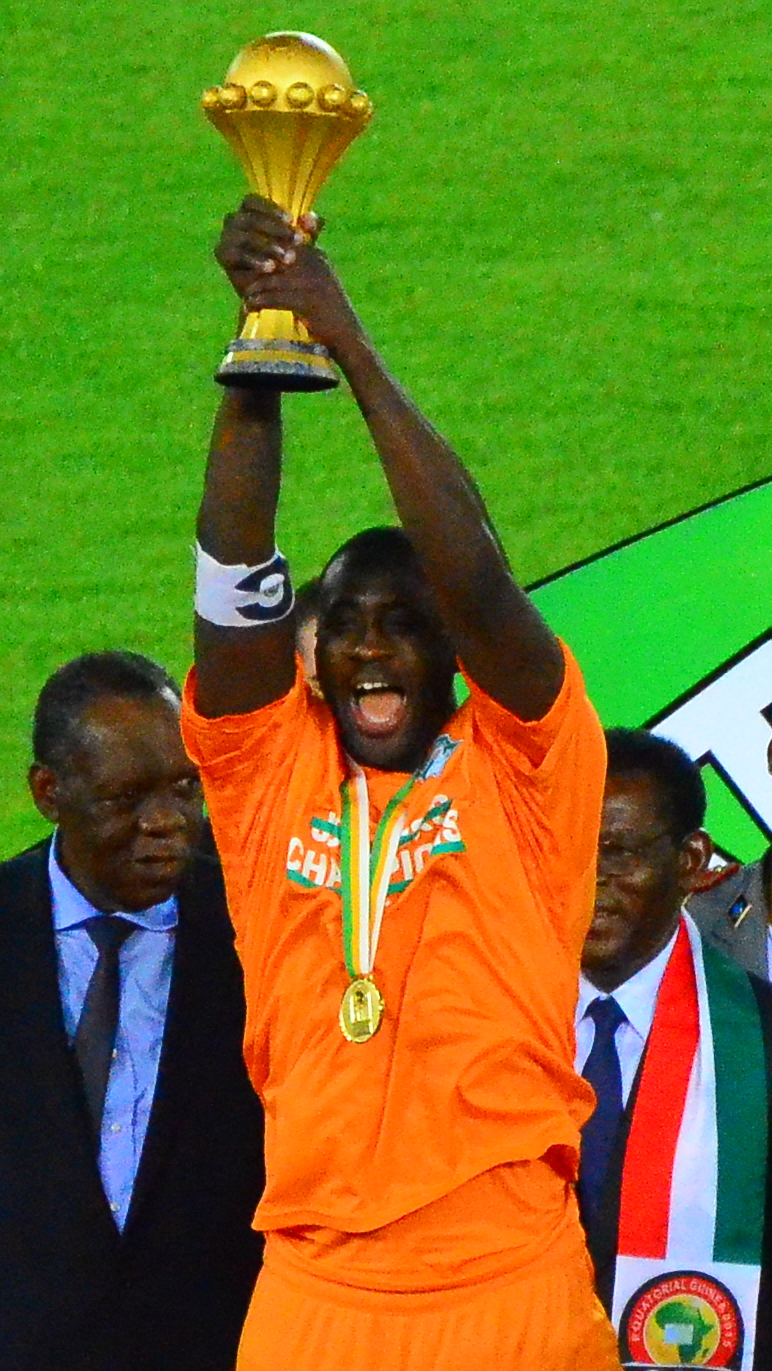
Yaya Touré of Ivory Coast lifts the Africa Cup of Nations trophy after winning against Ghana in the 2015 final in Bata, Equatorial Guinea.

| Team | Winners | Runners-up | Total finals | Years won | Years runners-up |
|---|---|---|---|---|---|
| Egypt | 7 | 3 | 10 | 1957, **1959**^{1}, **1986**, 1998, **2006**, 2008, 2010 | 1962^{1}, 2017, 2021 |
| Cameroon | 5 | 2 | 7 | 1984, 1988, 2000, 2002, 2017 | 1986, 2008 |
| Ghana | 4 | 5 | 9 | **1963**, 1965, **1978**, 1982 | 1968, 1970, 1992, 2010, 2015 |
| Nigeria | 3 | 5 | 8 | **1980**, 1994, 2013 | 1984, 1988, 1990, **2000**, 2023 |
| Ivory Coast | 3 | 2 | 5 | 1992, 2015, **2023** | 2006, 2012 |
| Algeria | 2 | 1 | 3 | **1990**, 2019 | 1980 |
| Morocco | 2 | 1 | 3 | 1976, **2025** | 2004 |
| DR Congo | 2 | 0 | 2 | 1968^{2}, 1974^{3} | — |
| Senegal | 1 | 3 | 4 | 2021 | 2002, 2019, 2025 |
| Zambia | 1 | 2 | 3 | 2012 | 1974, 1994 |
| Tunisia | 1 | 2 | 3 | **2004** | **1965**, 1996 |
| Sudan | 1 | 2 | 3 | **1970** | 1959, 1963 |
| Ethiopia | 1 | 1 | 2 | **1962** | 1957 |
| South Africa | 1 | 1 | 2 | **1996** | 1998 |
| Congo | 1 | 0 | 1 | 1972 | — |
| Mali | 0 | 1 | 1 | — | 1972 |
| Burkina Faso | 0 | 1 | 1 | — | 2013 |
| Uganda | 0 | 1 | 1 | — | 1978 |
| Guinea | 0 | 1 | 1 | — | 1976 |
| Libya | 0 | 1 | 1 | — | **1982** |

^{1} as United Arab Republic
^{2} as Congo-Kinshasa
^{3} as Zaire

== Map ==
Final match venue locations

== See also ==
- List of African Nations Championship finals
- List of FIFA World Cup finals
- List of UEFA European Championship finals
- List of Copa América finals
- List of CONCACAF Gold Cup finals
- List of AFC Asian Cup finals
- List of OFC Nations Cup finals
