= 2002 OFC Nations Cup final =

2002 OFC Nations final
- Event: 2002 OFC Nations Cup
Australia	New Zealand
(Australia)	(New Zealand)
0	1
- Date: 14 July 2002
- Venue: Ericsson Stadium, Auckland
- Man of the Match: Ryan Nelsen (New Zealand)
- Referee: Charles Ariiotima (Tahiti)
- Attendance: 3,000

The 2002 OFC Nations Cup final was a football match that took place on 14 July 2002 at the Ericsson Stadium in Auckland, New Zealand to determine the 2002 OFC Nations Cup champion. New Zealand defeated Australia 1–0, with the only goal being scored by central defender Ryan Nelsen in the 78th minute. The match was the third final between the two countries, an OFC Nations Cup record, after their 1998 and 2000 matches. With the win, New Zealand qualified for the 2003 FIFA Confederations Cup, and the AFC–OFC Challenge Cup.

== Match ==
=== Details ===
14 July 2002
15:30 NZST

Australia	0–1	New Zealand
		Nelsen 78'

Ericsson Stadium, Auckland
Attendance: 3,000
Referee: Charles Ariiotima (Tahiti)

Australia	New Zealand

GK	1	Jason Petkovic
RB	4	Mehmet Durakovic
CB	5	Steve Horvat
CB	6	Patrick Kisnorbo
LB	3	Jade North		(substituted off) 82'
RM	2	Fausto De Amicis	(yellow card) 69'	(substituted off) 82'
CM	14	Angelo Costanzo
CM	17	Ante Juric
LM	11	Scott Chipperfield	(yellow card) 37'
CF	9	Damian Mori (c)
CF	8	Joel Porter		(substituted off) 73'
Substitutes:
MF	7	Robbie Middleby		(substituted on) 82'
FW	10	Bobby Despotovski		(substituted on) 73'
MF	12	Tom Pondeljak		(substituted on) 82'
DF	13	Milan Blagojevic
CF	15	Ante Milicic
FW	16	Paul Trimboli
GK	18	Dean Anastasiadis
Manager:
Frank Farina

GK	1	Jason Batty		(substituted off) 57'
RB	2	Duncan Oughton
CB	4	Chris Zoricich	(yellow card) 63'
CB	14	Ryan Nelsen (c)
LB	20	Gerard Davis
DM	12	Simon Elliott
RM	7	Mark Burton
CM	15	Ivan Vicelich	(yellow card) 19'
CM	8	Aaran Lines
LM	10	Chris Jackson	(yellow card) 40'
CF	11	Chris Killen
Substitutes:
DF	3	Lee Jones
DF	5	Jonathan Perry
MF	6	Raf de Gregorio
FW	9	Paul Urlovic
DF	13	Christian Bouckenooghe
MF	16	Glen Collins
MF	17	Jeff Campbell
DF	18	Scott Smith
GK	19	James Bannatyne		(substituted on) 57'
Manager:
Mick Waitt

Man of the Match:
Ryan Nelsen (New Zealand)

Match officials

- Assistant referees:
  - Gray Vuke (Vanuatu)
  - Michel Angot (Tahiti)
- Fourth official:Harry Attison (Vanuatu)

Match rules

- 90 minutes.
- 30 minutes of golden goal extra time if necessary.
- Penalty shoot-out if scores still level.
- Maximum of three substitutions.

== See also ==
- Australia–New Zealand soccer rivalry
