= Rupert Ryan (footballer) =

New Zealand footballer (born 1974)

Personal information
- Full name: Rupert Ryan
- Date of birth: 25 February 1974 (age 52)
- Place of birth: New Zealand
- Positions: Striker; right back

Senior career*
Years	Team	Apps	(Gls)
1995–1996	Wellington United		
1997–2001	Napier City Rovers		
2002–2004	Miramar Rangers		
2004–2005	Team Wellington		
2005–2009	Western Suburbs Porirua		
2007–2008	→ Team Wellington (Loan)		
2010–	Oxley United FC		

International career
1998	New Zealand	2	(2)
Medal record
Representing New Zealand
Men's Association football
OFC Nations Cup
Winner	1998 Australia
- * Club domestic league appearances and goals

Rupert Ryan (born 25 February 1974) is a football (soccer) player, who currently plays with Oxley United FC in Football Queensland Premier League 5.

== International ==
Ryan represented New Zealand at international level and scored two goals, in two games for the All Whites.

Ryan played two official A-international matches for the New Zealand in 1998, the first an 8–1 over Vanuatu, on 28 September when he scored two goals, his second and final appearance a 1–0 win over Fiji on 2 October 1998.

== Career statistics ==
=== International ===
Appearances and goals by national team and year
National team	Year	Apps	Goals
New Zealand	1998	2	2
Total		2	2

Scores and results list New Zealand's goal tally first, score column indicates score after each Ryan goal.

List of international goals scored by Rupert Ryan
No.	Date	Venue	Opponent	Score	Result	Competition	Ref.
1	28 September 1998	Lang Park, Brisbane, Australia	Vanuatu	4–0	8–1	1998 OFC Nations Cup	
2	28 September 1998	Lang Park, Brisbane, Australia	Vanuatu	7–1	8–1	1998 OFC Nations Cup	

== Honours ==
New Zealand

- OFC Nations Cup: 1998
