= List of Copa América finals =

The Copa América is an international association football competition established in 1916. It is contested by the men's national teams of the members of the Confederación Sudamericana de Fútbol (CONMEBOL), the sport's continental governing body.

Early editions of the tournament, then known as the South American Football Championship, consisted of a round-robin group, where the team with the most points was declared the champion (with a play-off to break a tie if necessary). In 1975, when the tournament was rebranded to its current title, a final stage using the single-elimination format was introduced, which culminates with a final match between the last two teams remaining in contention. This type of format has been used ever since, except in 1989 and 1991, which featured a final group stage.

Argentina defeated Colombia in the final of the latest competition, held in 2024.

== Finals ==
Keys

- aet: after extra time
- p: penalty shoot-out
- Final played in two-legged format (with a playoff if necessary).
- Defined on penalties after 90 minutes.
- Defined on penalties after extra time
- Teams in italics are non-CONMEBOL members that participated as invitees.

Ed.	Year	Winners	Score	Runners-up	Venue	Location	Attendance
30	1975	Peru	0–1	Colombia	El Campín	Bogotá, Colombia	50,000
30	1975	Peru	2–0	Colombia	Estadio Nacional	Lima, Peru	50,000
30	1975	Peru	1–0 (Note: After the two legs ends 2–2 on points (with no goal difference rule), a playoff match was held; Peru won 4–2 on points.)	Colombia	Estadio Olímpico	Caracas, Venezuela	30,000
31	1979	Paraguay	3–0	Chile	Defensores del Chaco	Asunción, Paraguay	36,700
31	1979	Paraguay	0–1	Chile	Estadio Nacional	Santiago, Chile	51,200
31	1979	Paraguay	0–0 (a.e.t.) (Note: After 120 minutes had expired in the playoff, both teams finished 3–3 on points: Paraguay were declared champions on goal difference (3–1).)	Chile	José Amalfitani	Buenos Aires, Argentina	30,000
32	1983	Uruguay	2–0	Brazil	Estadio Centenario	Montevideo, Uruguay	65,000
32	1983	Uruguay	1–1 (Note: Uruguay won 3–1 on points.)	Brazil	Fonte Nova	Salvador, Brazil	95,000
33	1987	Uruguay	1–0	Chile	Monumental	Buenos Aires, Argentina	35,000
36	1993	Argentina	2–1	Mexico	Monumental	Guayaquil, Ecuador	40,000
37	1995	Uruguay	1–1 (5–3 p)	Brazil	Estadio Centenario	Montevideo, Uruguay	60,000
38	1997	Brazil	3–1	Bolivia	Hernando Siles	La Paz, Bolivia	46,000
39	1999	Brazil	3–0	Uruguay	Defensores del Chaco	Asunción, Paraguay	30,000
40	2001	Colombia	1–0	Mexico	El Campín	Bogotá, Colombia	47,000
41	2004	Brazil	2–2 (4–2 p)	Argentina	Estadio Nacional	Lima, Peru	43,000
42	2007	Brazil	3–0	Argentina	José E. Romero	Maracaibo, Venezuela	40,000
43	2011	Uruguay	3–0	Paraguay	Monumental	Buenos Aires, Argentina	57,921
44	2015	Chile	0–0 (a.e.t.) (4–1 p)	Argentina	Estadio Nacional	Santiago, Chile	45,693
45	2016	Chile	0–0 (a.e.t.) (4–2 p)	Argentina	MetLife Stadium	East Rutherford, United States	82,026
46	2019	Brazil	3–1	Peru	Maracanã	Rio de Janeiro, Brazil	69,968
47	2021	Argentina	1–0	Brazil	Maracanã	Rio de Janeiro, Brazil	7,800
48	2024	Argentina	1–0 (a.e.t.)	Colombia	Hard Rock Stadium	Miami Gardens, United States	65,300
49	2028						

== Results by nation ==
Map of CONMEBOL members, by their Copa América title number 15 9 2 1 0

Team	Titles	Runners-up	Total finals
Argentina	16 (1921*, 1925*, 1927, 1929*, 1937*, 1941, 1945, 1946*, 1947, 1955, 1957, 1959*, 1991, 1993, 2021, 2024)	14 (1916*, 1917, 1920, 1923, 1924, 1926, 1935, 1942, 1959, 1967, 2004, 2007, 2015, 2016)	30
Uruguay	15 (1916, 1917*, 1920, 1923*, 1924*, 1926, 1935, 1942*, 1956*, 1959, 1967*, 1983, 1987, 1995*, 2011)	6 (1919, 1927, 1939, 1941, 1989, 1999)	21
Brazil	9 (1919*, 1922*, 1949*, 1989*, 1997, 1999, 2004, 2007, 2019*)	11 (1921, 1925, 1937, 1945, 1946, 1953, 1957, 1959, 1983, 1991, 1995, 2021*)	20
Paraguay	2 (1953, 1979)	6 (1922, 1929, 1947, 1949, 1963, 2011)	8
Chile	2 (2015*, 2016)	4 (1955*, 1956, 1979, 1987)	6
Peru	2 (1939*, 1975)	1 (2019)	3
Colombia	1 (2001*)	2 (1975, 2024)	3
Bolivia	1 (1963*)	1 (1997*)	2
Mexico	—	2 (1993, 2001)	2

* Indicates host country

== See also ==
- List of FIFA World Cup finals
- List of UEFA European Championship finals
- List of AFC Asian Cup finals
- List of Africa Cup of Nations finals
- List of CONCACAF Gold Cup finals
- List of OFC Nations Cup finals
