= Gerald Quennet =

Footballer (born 1973)

Personal information
- Date of birth: 11 December 1973 (age 52)
- Place of birth: France
- Position: Forward

Senior career*
Years	Team	Apps	(Gls)
1999	Wollongong Wolves	6	(1)

International career
1998	Tahiti	4	(3)
- * Club domestic league appearances and goals

Gerald Quennet (born 11 December 1973) is a former footballer who played as a forward for Wollongong Wolves. Born in France, he was a Tahiti international.

== Club career ==
Before the second half of the 1998–99 season, Quennet signed for Australian top flight side Wollongong Wolves.

== International career ==
On 30 September 1998, Quennet scored three goals for Tahiti during a 5–1 win over Vanuatu.
