= Mark Burton (footballer) =

New Zealand footballer (born 1974)

Personal information
- Date of birth: 18 May 1974 (age 52)
- Place of birth: Wellington, New Zealand
- Height: 1.80 m (5 ft 11 in)
- Position: Attacking midfielder

Youth career
- Brooklyn Northern United
- Wellington United
- Miramar Rangers

Senior career*
Years	Team	Apps	(Gls)
1992–1995	Werder Bremen II		
1995–1998	VfL Osnabrück	68	(11)
1998–1999	Kickers Emden		
1999–2000	VfB Lübeck		
2000–2004	Football Kingz	69	(3)

International career
1996–2003	New Zealand	27	(6)
Medal record
Representing New Zealand
Men's Association football
OFC Nations Cup
Winner	1998 Australia
Winner	2002 New Zealand
- * Club domestic league appearances and goals

Mark Burton (born 18 May 1974) is a retired association football player who represented the New Zealand national team at international level. He played as an attacking midfielder.

== Club career ==
As a teenager, Burton was recommended to SV Werder Bremen by compatriot and New Zealand football legend Wynton Rufer who played for Bremen at the time. After spending several years in their youth and amateur sides, he moved to lower division teams VfL Osnabrück, Kickers Emden and VfB Lübeck before returning to New Zealand.

== International career ==
Burton played for the New Zealand national team collecting 27 caps and six goals in official FIFA internationals between 1996 and 2003. He twice played at the FIFA Confederations Cup and also twice at the OFC Nations Cup. At the 2002 OFC Nations Cup in Auckland, the Most Valuable Player of the Tournament Award was presented for the first time, with Burton being deemed the best player of the tournament.

== Career statistics ==
=== International ===
Appearances and goals by national team and year
National team	Year	Apps	Goals
New Zealand	1996	1	0
New Zealand	1997	3	0
New Zealand	1998	3	1
New Zealand	1999	8	0
New Zealand	2001	4	1
New Zealand	2002	5	4
New Zealand	2003	4	0
Total		28	6

Scores and results list New Zealand's goal tally first, score column indicates score after each Burton goal.

List of international goals scored by Mark Burton
No.	Date	Venue	Opponent	Score	Result	Competition	Ref.
1	4 October 1998	Lang Park, Brisbane, Australia	Australia	1–0	1–0	1998 OFC Nations Cup	
2	13 June 2001	North Harbour Stadium, North Shore City, New Zealand	Vanuatu	6–0	7–0	2002 FIFA World Cup qualification	
3	7 July 2002	North Harbour Stadium, North Shore City, New Zealand	Papua New Guinea	8–1	9–1	2002 OFC Nations Cup	
4	9 July 2002	North Harbour Stadium, North Shore City, New Zealand	Solomon Islands	6–1	6–1	2002 OFC Nations Cup	
5	12 July 2002	Mount Smart Stadium, Auckland, New Zealand	Vanuatu	1–0	3–0	2002 OFC Nations Cup	
6	12 July 2002	Mount Smart Stadium, Auckland, New Zealand	Vanuatu	3–0	3–0	2002 OFC Nations Cup	

== Honours ==
New Zealand

- OFC Nations Cup: 1998, 2002
