= 1996 OFC Nations Cup final =

- Event: 1996 OFC Nations Cup
Tahiti	Australia
(French Polynesia)	(Australia)
0	11
- on aggregate

First leg
Tahiti	Australia
0	6
- Date: 27 October 1996
- Venue: Olympic Stadium, Papeete
- Referee: Barry Tasker (New Zealand)
- Attendance: 5,000

Second leg
Australia	Tahiti
5	0
- Date: 1 November 1996
- Venue: Bruce Stadium, Canberra
- Referee: Intaz Shah (Fiji)
- Attendance: 9,421

The 1996 OFC Nations Cup final was an association football match played over two-legs between Australia and Tahiti. It was the final match of the 1996 OFC Nations Cup which was the third edition of the OFC Nations Cup, a competition for national teams in the Oceania Football Confederation.

This final was a repeat of the 1980 final in which Australia defeated Tahiti 4–2. Australia and Tahiti each qualified through to the final by playing in a semi-final over two legs. Australia defeating New Zealand 3–0 in their semi-final while Tahiti defeated Fiji 3–1 in the other semi-final.

The first leg was played on the 27 October at the Olympic Stadium in Papeete and saw Australia defeat Tahiti 6–0 with four goals coming from Kris Trajanovski. Australia would score five more goals in the second leg at the Bruce Stadium in Canberra on the 1 November to win 11–0 on aggregate and get the right to play in the 1997 FIFA Confederations Cup as the representative from the OFC.

== Background ==
Australia and Tahiti played two matches to reach the final with the semi-finals being played over two legs. For Australia, they didn't need to qualify to the main draw for the 1996 OFC Nations Cup as one of the two automatic teams to qualify teams to get through to the final round. In the semi-final, they took on New Zealand in their semi-final. In the first-leg played at Christchurch, they held New Zealand to a scrappy nil-all draw with the Australians squandering three opportunities to score including one which hit the crossbar. In the second leg played at Newcastle, Australia would get a 3–0 victory over New Zealand to take home the Trans-Tasman Cup as goals from Damian Mori, Paul Wade and Joe Spiteri secured the spot into the final.

After Tahiti won the 1994 Polynesia Cup which was held in Samoa, Tahiti qualified for the semi-finals to take on Fiji who won the 1994 Melanesia Cup. In the first-leg, a goal to Jean-Loup Rousseau in the 72nd minute secured Tahiti's 1-0 win at Honaira. The second-leg which was played at Papeete saw Jean-Loup Rousseau score the opening goal in the 46th minute before the Solomon Islands hit back in the 81st minute off the back of Robert Seni. Macha Gatien scored the match winner in the 88th minute to give Tahiti the win.

== Match ==
=== First leg ===
The first leg of the final was played at the Olympic Stadium in Papeete. After being brought on in the last minute before the match, Kris Trajanovski scored four consecutive goals to secure the Socceroos a 6-0 win. Before the four goals from Trajanovski, Ernie Tapai opened the scoring in the fifth minute after picking up a rebound off the Tahitian keeper. Paul Trimboli was the other scorer for the Australians scoring in the 20th minute of play.

27 October 1996

Tahiti	0–6	Australia
		Kris Trajanovski 25', 28', 44', 89'; Ernie Tapai 5'; Paul Trimboli 20'

Olympic Stadium, Papeete
Attendance: 5,000
Referee: Barry Tasker (New Zealand)

=== Second leg ===
The second leg was played at Bruce Stadium in Canberra. The match would be very similar to the first-leg with a hat-trick from Kris Trajanovski securing an 5–0 win for the Australians as Paul Wade played his last international match for the Socceroos.

1 November 1996

Australia	5–0	Tahiti
Kris Trajanovski 21', 36', 54'; Robbie Hooker 11'; Rupena Raumati 31' (o.g.)

Bruce Stadium, Canberra
Attendance: 9,421
Referee: Intaz Shah (Fiji)
