= Kris Trajanovski =

Australian soccer player and coach (born 1972)

Personal information
- Date of birth: 19 February 1972 (age 54)
- Place of birth: Geelong, Victoria, Australia
- Position: Forward

Youth career
- Geelong SC

Senior career*
Years	Team	Apps	(Gls)
- Altona
1989–1990	AIS		
1990–1992	Preston Makedonia	62	(9)
1992	Rockdale Ilinden		
1993–1994	Sydney Olympic	25	(5)
1994	Happy Valley		
1994–1995	South China		
1995–1997	Sydney Olympic	59	(28)
1997–1998	Adelaide City	27	(3)
1998–2001	Marconi	89	(22)
2001–2003	Brisbane Strikers	36	(9)
2003	Tanjong Pagar United	15	(1)
2003–2004	Melbourne Knights	11	(2)
2004	Whittlesea Stallions		
2005–2008	White City Woodville	73	(15)
2009	Seaford Rangers	21	(9)
2010–2012	Adelaide Cobras	2	(0)

International career^{‡}
1991	Australia U-20		
1996–1998	Australia	16	(10/11)

Managerial career
- 2011–2012: Adelaide Cobras
Medal record
Representing Australia
Men's Association football
OFC Nations Cup
Winner	1996 Oceania
Runner-up	1998 Australia
- * Club domestic league appearances and goals as of 10 September 2011 ‡ National team caps and goals as of 23 August 2011

Kris Trajanovski (born 19 February 1972 in Geelong, Victoria) is an Australian association football player and coach.

== Playing career ==
=== Club career ===
After playing with Altona Magic in the Victorian State League, Trajanovski attended the Australian Institute of Sport in 1989. In 1991, he joined National Soccer League team Preston Makedonia. He then joined Rockdale Ilinden in the New South Wales State League in 1992.

Trajanovski joined Hong Kong team Happy Valley for the final six matches of the 1992–93 Hong Kong First Division League season.

He returned to Hong Kong for the 1994–95 Hong Kong First Division League season, playing for South China.

Returning to Australia, he joined NSL club Sydney Olympic in 1995. After two seasons with Olympic he moved to Adelaide City for the 1997–98 NSL season. 1998 saw a move to Marconi where he stayed until 2001. Again moving, he signed for Brisbane Strikers and played two seasons in the Queensland capital. In 2003, he joined Singapore club Tanjong Pagar United. In November 2003 he returned to Australia to play for Melbourne Knights during the 2003–04 NSL season.

His career at national league level finished with the demise of the National Soccer League in 2004. Between 1991 and 2004 he played 314 NSL games, scoring 90 goals. Despite stepping away from the national stage he continued to play state league football. In 2004, he joined Whittlesea in the Victorian Premier League and later had a stint with Seaford Rangers in the South Australian Premier League.

As of March 2011 he was a playing-coach with the Adelaide Cobras in the South Australian Premier League.

=== International career ===
In 1991 Trajanovski was a member of the Australian under-20 team at the 1991 FIFA World Youth Championship in Portugal. He played in four matches at the tournament, including the semi-final against eventual champions Portugal.

In 1996 Trajanovski played for Indonesia in an exhibition match against Sampdoria in Jakarta.

Trajanovski made his debut for Australia in 1996 against Kenya in Pretoria. Despite scoring in only three full international matches for the Socceroos, each time he scored a hat-trick. The first hat-trick was in the first leg of the 1996 OFC Nations Cup final against Tahiti in Papeete when he scored four of Australia's six goals. In the second leg of the final in Canberra he scored three goals to lead Australia to an 11–0 aggregate win. His third hat-trick was almost two years later in September 1998. Playing against Cook Islands he scored three or four goals as a substitute in Australia's 16–0 win.

== Coaching career ==
In 2011 Trajanovski was appointed coach of Adelaide Cobras in the South Australian Premier League.

== Career statistics ==
=== International ===
Appearances and goals by national team and year
National team	Year	Apps	Goals
Australia	1996	3	7
Australia	1997	6	0
Australia	1998	7	4
Total		16	11

Scores and results list Australia's goal tally first, score column indicates score after each Trajanovski goal.

List of international goals scored by Kris Trajanovski
No.	Date	Venue	Opponent	Score	Result	Competition	Ref.
1	26 October 1996	Stade Pater, Papeete, Tahiti	Tahiti	3–0	6–0	1996 OFC Nations Cup	
2	26 October 1996	Stade Pater, Papeete, Tahiti	Tahiti	4–0	6–0	1996 OFC Nations Cup	
3	26 October 1996	Stade Pater, Papeete, Tahiti	Tahiti	5–0	6–0	1996 OFC Nations Cup	
4	26 October 1996	Stade Pater, Papeete, Tahiti	Tahiti	6–0	6–0	1996 OFC Nations Cup	
5	1 November 1996	Bruce Stadium, Canberra, Australia	Tahiti	2–0	5–0	1996 OFC Nations Cup	
6	1 November 1996	Bruce Stadium, Canberra, Australia	Tahiti	4–0	5–0	1996 OFC Nations Cup	
7	1 November 1996	Bruce Stadium, Canberra, Australia	Tahiti	5–0	5–0	1996 OFC Nations Cup	
8	28 September 1998	Lang Park, Brisbane, Australia	Cook Islands	9–0	16–0	1998 OFC Nations Cup	
9	28 September 1998	Lang Park, Brisbane, Australia	Cook Islands	12–0	16–0	1998 OFC Nations Cup	
10	28 September 1998	Lang Park, Brisbane, Australia	Cook Islands	13–0	16–0	1998 OFC Nations Cup	
11	28 September 1998	Lang Park, Brisbane, Australia	Cook Islands	15–0	16–0	1998 OFC Nations Cup	

== Honours ==
Australia

- OFC Nations Cup: 1996; runner-up 198
