= Paul Trimboli =

Australian soccer player

Personal information
- Full name: Paolo Vincenzo Trimboli
- Date of birth: 25 February 1969 (age 57)
- Place of birth: Melbourne, Australia
- Position: Striker

Youth career
- Brighton
- 1986: AIS

Senior career*
Years	Team	Apps	(Gls)
1987	Sunshine George Cross	28	(4)
1988–2004	South Melbourne	430	(115)

International career^{‡}
1985	Australia U-17		
1987	Australia U-20		
1988–2002	Australia	46	(16)
Medal record
Representing Australia
Men's Association football
FIFA Confederations Cup
Runner-up	1997 Saudi Arabia
OFC Nations Cup
Winner	1996 Oceania
Runner-up	1998 Australia
Runner-up	2002 New Zealand
- * Club domestic league appearances and goals as of 14 August 2007 ‡ National team caps and goals as of 14 August 2007

Paolo "Paul" Vincenzo Trimboli (born 25 February 1969) is a former Australian international football (soccer) player. Trimboli is of Italian ancestry and attended Xavier College in Melbourne, where he was a member of the first soccer XI, captained by his brother.

== Club career ==
=== South Melbourne FC ===
Signed as a 19-year old from Sunshine George Cross, Trimboli rapidly showed why he was considered one of Australia's brightest talents. Primarily playing behind the striker, Trimboli terrorised opposition defences with his skill and vision. In his first two seasons at the club, he captured the Sam Papasavas medal for the best under-21 player in the NSL, as well as winning the Theo Marmaras medal for South Melbourne's player of the season in 1988, 1989 and 1990. Additionally, he tasted his first silverware with the club, winning the Dockerty Cup in 1988 and 1989.

In 1990/91, Trimboli helped South win their second NSL Championship – and their first since 1984 – by providing the all-important assist for Joe Palatsides' last-minute equaliser in the Grand Final against Melbourne Knights. Hellas would go on to win the title on penalties after a dramatic shootout.

Trimboli continued to dominate in the NSL and was rewarded with the Johnny Warren Medal in 1992/93 for the best player in the competition. His stronghold over the Theo Marmaras medal also continued as he claimed the award in 1996, 1997 and 1998.

In 1997/1998, Trimboli captained the Ange Postecoglou-led South Melbourne side to the Championship with a 2–1 win over Carlton in the Grand Final, whilst snaring his second Johnny Warren medal. Trimboli repeated the heroics in 1998/1999 by contributing a goal in South Melbourne's 3–2 win in the Grand Final against Sydney United.

With this victory, South Melbourne qualified for the 1999 Oceania Champions Cup to determine the best side in Oceania. After their subsequent 5-1 win against Nadi of Fiji, South Melbourne qualified for the 2000 Club World Cup in Brazil.

Trimboli led his Hellas team-mates against footballing giants Manchester United, Necaxa of Mexico and Brazil's Vasco Da Gama - all three of their matches taking place in the iconic Maracana stadium. Trimboli garnered praise for his performances against the likes of David Beckham and Romario in the tournament.

In 2001, Trimboli again captained South Melbourne to a grand final, which they lost 2–1 to Wollongong. He played for South until the demise of the NSL in 2004 and retired prior to the start of the A-League in 2005.

Trimboli is widely considered to be South Melbourne's greatest-ever player by fans and critics alike. He was voted captain of the South Melbourne team of the century in 2002. He is still South Melbourne's all-time record goalscorer (115), record games holder (430) and most decorated player in terms of individual accolades and silverware won.

== International career ==
He earned 48 caps (39 'A' games) with the Socceroos, marking his debut in 1988 against Fiji with a goal. His last international came in 2002 against Tahiti. Trimboli scored 16 goals for the green and gold.

Scores and results list Australia's goal tally first, score column indicates score after each Trimboli goal.

List of international goals scored by Paul Trimboli
No.	Date	Venue	Opponent	Score	Result	Competition	Ref.
1	3 December 1988	Lake Macquarie, Australia	Fiji	5–0	5–1	1990 FIFA World Cup qualification	
2	16 April 1989	Sydney Football Stadium, Sydney, Australia	Israel	1–1	1–1	1990 FIFA World Cup qualification	
3	15 April 1993	Woodlands Stadium, Woodlands, Singapore	Kuwait	1–0	1–0	Friendly	
4	14 September 1996	Kings Park Stadium, Durban, South Africa	Ghana	2–0	2–0	Friendly	
5	26 October 1996	Stade Pater, Papeete, Tahiti	Tahiti	2–0	6–0	1996 OFC Nations Cup	
6	13 June 1997	Western Sydney Stadium, Sydney, Australia	Tahiti	2–0	5–0	1998 FIFA World Cup qualification	
7	13 June 1997	Western Sydney Stadium, Sydney, Australia	Tahiti	3–0	5–0	1998 FIFA World Cup qualification	
8	19 June 1997	Western Sydney Stadium, Sydney, Australia	Tahiti	2–0	2–0	1998 FIFA World Cup qualification	
9	28 September 1998	Lang Park, Brisbane, Australia	Cook Islands	1–0	16–0	1998 OFC Nations Cup	
10	28 September 1998	Lang Park, Brisbane, Australia	Cook Islands	3–0	16–0	1998 OFC Nations Cup	
11	28 September 1998	Lang Park, Brisbane, Australia	Cook Islands	10–0	16–0	1998 OFC Nations Cup	
12	8 July 2002	Mount Smart Stadium, Auckland, New Zealand	New Caledonia	11–0	11–0	2002 OFC Nations Cup	
13	10 July 2002	Mount Smart Stadium, Auckland, New Zealand	Fiji	6–0	8–0	2002 OFC Nations Cup	

== After retirement ==
On 21 June 2011, he was appointed General Manager of Football at A-League club Brisbane Roar.

On 25 June 2012, Trimboli reunited with Ange Postecoglou to join Melbourne Victory as Football Operations Manager.

== Honours ==
South Melbourne FC:

- NSL Championship: 1990–1991, 1997–1998, 1998–1999
- NSL Premiers: 1992/1993, 1997/1998, 2000/2001
- OFC Champions League : 1999
- Dockerty Cup: 1988,1989,1991,1993,1995
- NSL Cup: 1990, 1996

Australia

- FIFA Confederations Cup: runner-up, 1997
- OFC Nations Cup: 1996; runner-up, 1998, 2002

Personal honours:

- Johnny Warren Medal: 1992–1993, 1997–1998
- NSL Papasavas Medal (U-21): 1988, 1989
- South Melbourne FC All-time Top Goalscorer
- South Melbourne FC All-time Club Appearances
- South Melbourne Team of the Century
- South Melbourne Hall of Fame
