= 1980 Oceania Cup final =

1980 OFC Nations final
- Event: 1980 OFC Nations Cup
Australia	Tahiti
(Australia)	(French Polynesia)
4	2
- Date: 1 March 1980
- Venue: Nouméa Stadium, Nouméa
- Referee: ()

The 1980 OFC Nations Cup final was an association football match that took place on 1 March 1980 at Nouméa Stadium, Nouméa. It was the final match of the 1980 OFC Nations Cup which was the second edition of the OFC Nations Cup, a competition for national teams in the Oceania Football Confederation.

It was contested by Australia and Tahiti. The match was rescheduled from Sunday, 2 March to Saturday, 1 March at the request of Tahiti captain Erroll Bennett, who as a Latter Day Saint preferred not to play on Sundays. For Tahiti this was their second final after they appeared in the previous final which they loss to New Zealand. For Australia this was their first appearance at an OFC final after not entering the 1973 edition. Both teams won their groups to make to the final with Australia scoring twenty goals while conceding only two goals while Tahiti scored twenty-one goals and conceding five.

In the final, it was Australia who took out their first title as goals from Paul Kay, Danny Moulis and Vic Bozanic secured the 4–2 victory over Tahiti.

== Match ==
1 March 1980

Australia	4–2	Tahiti
Kay 4', 29'; Moulis (?); Bozanic (?)	Report	Wabealo 11'; Bennett (?)

Nouméa, New Caledonia
