= 1996 OFC Nations Cup =

Tournament details
- Dates: 10 November 1995 – 1 November 1996
- Teams: 4 (from 1 confederation)

Final positions
- Champions: Australia (2nd title)
- Runners-up: Tahiti

Tournament statistics
- Matches played: 6
- Goals scored: 18 (3 per match)
- Attendance: 46,858 (7,810 per match)
- Top scorer: (Australia) Kris Trajanovski (7 goals)

The 1996 OFC Nations Cup was not held as a cohesive tournament, but consisted of semi-finals and a final played on a two-legged basis, stretched out between November 1995 and November 1996.

The four participating teams were Australia and New Zealand who qualified as of right, Solomon Islands who qualified as Melanesia Cup holders, and Tahiti who qualified as Polynesia Cup holders.

The semifinals between Australia and New Zealand was also valid for the 1995 Trans-Tasman Cup.

== Qualification ==
=== Qualified teams ===
Team	Qualified as
Australia	Automatically qualified
New Zealand	Automatically qualified
Solomon Islands	1994 Melanesia Cup winner
Tahiti	1994 Polynesia Cup winner

== Final tournament ==
=== Squads ===
For a list of participating players for the entirety of the competition: 1996 OFC Nations Cup squads

=== Bracket ===
Semi-finals
Solomon Islands	0	1	1
Tahiti	1	2	3
1995 Trans-Tasman Cup
New Zealand	0	0	0
Australia	0	3	3

Final
Tahiti	0	0	0
Australia	6	5	11

=== Semi-finals ===
10 November 1995

New Zealand	0–0	Australia
	Report

Queen Elizabeth II Park, Christchurch
Attendance: 8,000
Referee: Barry Tasker (New Zealand)
15 November 1995

Australia	3–0	New Zealand
Mori 33'; Wade 45' (pen.); Spiteri 51'	Report

The Gardens Greyhound and Sporting Complex, Newcastle
Attendance: 8,858
Referee: Simon Micallef (Australia)

Australia won 3–0 on aggregate.

17 November 1995

Solomon Islands	0–1	Tahiti
	Report	Rousseau 72'

Lawson Tama Stadium, Honiara
Attendance: 15,000
Referee: Intaz Shah (Fiji)
11 May 1996

Tahiti	2–1	Solomon Islands
Rousseau 46'; Gatien 88'	Report	Seni 81'

Stade Pater, Papeete
Attendance: 15,000
Referee: Derek Rugg (New Zealand)

Tahiti won 3–1 on aggregate.

=== Final ===
27 October 1996

Tahiti	0–6	Australia
	Report	Tapai 5'; Trimboli 20'; Trajanovski 25', 28', 44', 89'

Stade Pater, Papeete
Attendance: 5,000
Referee: Barry Tasker (New Zealand)
1 November 1996

Australia	5–0	Tahiti
Hooker 11'; Trajanovski 21', 36', 54'; Raumati 31' (o.g.)	Report

Canberra Stadium, Canberra
Attendance: 9,421
Referee: Intaz Shah (Fiji)

Australia won 11–0 on aggregate.

== Goalscorers ==
7 goals

- (Australia) Kris Trajanovski

2 goals

- (French Polynesia) Jean-Loup Rousseau

1 goal

- (Australia) Damian Mori
- (Australia) Ernie Tapai
- (Australia) Joe Spiteri
- (Australia) Paul Trimboli
- (Australia) Paul Wade
- (Australia) Robbie Hooker
- (Solomon Islands) Robert Seni
- (French Polynesia) Macha Gatien

Own goal

- (French Polynesia) Rupena Raumati (playing against Australia)
