= OFC Men's Nations Cup =

Association football tournament

- Organiser(s): OFC
- Founded: 1973; 53 years ago
- Region: Oceania
- Teams: 8 (finals); 11 (qualification)
- Related competitions: OFC Women's Nations Cup
- Current champions: New Zealand (6th title)
- Most championships: New Zealand (6 titles)
- Broadcaster: FIFA+
- Website: oceaniafootball.com
- 2024 OFC Men's Nations Cup

The OFC Men's Nations Cup, known as the OFC Nations Cup before the 2024 edition, is the primary association football competition contested by the senior men's national teams of the members of the Oceania Football Confederation (OFC), determining the continental champion of Oceania. The winning team became the champion of Oceania and until 2016 qualified for the FIFA Confederations Cup.

Historically, a very large gulf separated Australia and New Zealand from the smaller island competitors, and little attention was paid to the tournament by the rest of the football world. The 2012 OFC Nations Cup is the only edition to date not won by either New Zealand or Australia, being won by Tahiti instead and is also the only tournament to date where neither Australia (who joined AFC in 2006 and therefore did not participate) nor New Zealand (who were knocked out in the semifinals) reached the final.

== History ==
=== First editions (1973–1980) ===
This tournament began in 1973 as the "Oceania Cup". This first edition was staged without a qualifying round and was won by the host in Auckland, New Zealand, that defeated Tahiti, 2–0. The tournament was characterised by the absence of the Australian team and the presence of some teams not members of FIFA, such as New Hebrides, which later became Vanuatu after gaining independence in 1980.

The second edition of the Oceania Cup took place in 1980 in New Caledonia, at that time not a FIFA member. Australia played the final match in Nouméa and defeated Tahiti, 4–2. The tournament was characterised by a poor result for New Zealand: out in the group stage losing against Tahiti (3–1) and Fiji (4–0). Two years later they qualified for the 1982 FIFA World Cup. These two editions were the only without qualifying rounds. After this edition the tournament was discontinued. So Australia maintained the Oceania Champion title for 16 years without playing in any tournaments. Between the years of absence (1981–1995) the most important Oceanian region tournament was the Trans-Tasman Cup played only between Australia and New Zealand.

=== Return, every two years (1996–2004) ===
In 1996, when OFC reached the official status of Confederation for FIFA, the tournament reappeared as the "Oceania Nations Cup" and served as a qualifier for the Confederations Cup. The 1996 edition lacked a host nation but had its inaugural qualifying round, contested with four teams playing semifinals and final match on two legs both: Australia and New Zealand, who played the semifinal also for the Trans-Tasman Cup, and the second semifinal match between Tahiti as Polynesia Cup holders and Solomon Islands as Melanesia Cup holders. Australia defended its title of The Cup winning easily in the final match, on two legs, against Tahiti (6–0 and 5–0). The topscorer of this tournament, Kris Trajanovski, scored all his seven goals in the final tie: four in the first leg in Papeete (Tahiti) and three in the second leg in Canberra (Australia). Thanks to this result, this Australian team, managed by the English Terry Venables and not by the Scottish Oceania Champion Eddie Thomson, took part to the 1997 FIFA Confederations Cup in Saudi Arabia.

In the 1998 edition six teams participated, hosted by Australia and dominated by Australia and New Zealand. In the final match, played in Brisbane, New Zealand beat the host Australia 1–0 with a goal by Mark Burton. In this edition the Australian player Damian Mori scored 10 goals, the standing record. He is also the overall Oceania Nations Cup top scorer with 14 goals, scored in three editions: one in 1996, ten in 1998 and three in 2002.

The fifth edition was hosted by Tahiti in 2000. The tournament structure was confirmed and again the tournament was dominated by Australia and New Zealand who reached the final match in Papeete. Australia won their third title by a score of 2–0, qualifying for the 2001 FIFA Confederations Cup. Fiji, who qualified for this edition, was forced to withdraw due to civil war and was replaced by Vanuatu, who impressed in the semifinal against Australia: the Socceroos, managed by Frank Farina, won 1–0 thanks only to a penalty kick by Kevin Muscat. Two years later the Australian team finished third in the 2001 FIFA Confederations Cup in South Korea and Japan.

For the 2002 edition, hosted by New Zealand, eight teams participated, divided into two groups won by Australia and New Zealand. This was their third consecutive final match. The Australian side won the semifinal against a brave Tahiti only after extra time. Soccer Australia was involved in financial problems: the non-existent financial contribution meant that the Australian players had to pay their own way to get to New Zealand, so Scott Chipperfield became the only one of Australia's large European contingent to answer the call and perform for his country in their time of need, resulting in a weak team for the tournament. So the final was won for the third time by the All Whites beating their historical rivals 1–0 in Auckland with a late Ryan Nelsen goal.

In the 2004 edition, which served also as the 2006 FIFA World Cup qualification and was played in Australia, six nations took part playing each other in a unique group, with the first two playing a final match in two legs. During the group stage Vanuatu surprisingly beat New Zealand 4–2, but lost all their remaining matches. This and a draw with Australia (2–2) allowed Solomon Islands to claim second place and a berth in the final match against Australia. In the final, the Solomon Islands were beaten 5–1 on their home ground Honiara and 6–0 in Sydney. Moreover, this was the first, and until today the only time that a coach, Frank Farina, has won the Oceania Nations Cup trophy twice. Two years later, managed by Dutchman Guus Hiddink and composed of many 2004 Oceania Nations Cup scorers such as Tim Cahill, Harry Kewell, Mark Bresciano, Brett Emerton, John Aloisi, Australia reached the second round of the 2006 FIFA World Cup in Germany. However, this was the fourth and last OFC title for Australia: in 2006 they decided to join AFC, changing considerably the Oceania football scene.

=== A new era (2006–present) ===
Australia joined the Asian Football Confederation on 1 January 2006, ceasing to be a member of OFC, leaving New Zealand as the only major power in the OFC. The 2007 South Pacific Games, won by New Caledonia, served as a qualifying round for the three lowest ranked teams in the OFC, with the winners qualifying for the 2008 OFC Nations Cup. The 2008 OFC Nations Cup was played without a fixed venue and with four teams playing each other at home and away in one group. The tournament also served as part of the OFC's qualifying competition for the 2010 FIFA World Cup. New Zealand emerged easily as winners for the fourth time ahead of New Caledonia, winning five matches of six. Surprisingly, Fiji won the last match against New Zealand in Lautoka (Fiji) for 2–0 with two goals of Roy Krishna. The top-scorer Shane Smeltz (New Zealand) scored eight goals: four against the runners up New Caledonia beaten 3–1 away and 3–0 at home.

The 2012 edition of the tournament was originally meant to be played in Fiji, but they were stripped from hosting due to the ongoing legal dispute involving OFC general secretary Tai Nicholas and Fijian authorities. Hosting rights was moved to the Solomon Islands as they were joined by New Zealand, New Caledonia, Vanuatu, Tahiti, Fiji, Papua New Guinea and Samoa (winner of the qualifying tournament). The draw which was similar to the 2002 edition with them competing in two groups of four teams, with the top two in each group qualifying for the semi-finals. After 9 days, Tahiti and New Caledonia reached the final in Lawson Tama Stadium with Tahiti winning 1–0 with a goal from Steevy Chong Hue. With this, Tahiti became the first team other than Australia (no longer part of OFC) and New Zealand to be crowned Oceania champions. The tournament also served as part of the OFC's qualifying competition for the 2014 FIFA World Cup.

After the cancellation of the 2020 OFC Nations Cup, the tournament was confirmed for 2024 as the 2024 OFC Men's Nations Cup. The tournament would not serve as World Cup qualifiers.

== Format ==
The first two editions were played without any qualifying rounds. For the successive three tournaments, Australia and New Zealand were seeded into the tournament automatically, while the remaining ten nations played to qualify. The Polynesian and Melanesian Cups, each played between five nations grouped on a geographical basis, served as qualifications via a round-robin tournament, with the highest ranked two teams in each competition qualifying for the actual OFC Nations Cup.

With the postponement and then cancellation of the Melanesian Cup, and a similar fate befalling its Polynesian equivalent, the format of the tournament changed in 2002. FIFA rankings determined the seedings of all twelve teams, and the lower six teams played a group stage for two qualifier positions into the main tournament. The 2002 Cup tournament proper was played with two groups of four teams (again in round-robin style), which led into a 4-way knockout stage, playing for the top four positions.

In 2004, the format changed once again, returning to a format similar to that of the 1996–2000 tournaments, with five teams each playing in two qualifying groups and Australia and New Zealand seeded to the actual tournament, played as a group stage of six, with a home and away Final played between the two highest-placed teams. This tournament doubled also as qualifying round for the 2006 FIFA World Cup.

For the 2008 tournament, the format altered again. The 2007 South Pacific Games football tournament served as a qualification tournament, with the gold, silver and bronze winning nations progressing to the main, round-robin format, tournament, for which New Zealand qualified automatically. New Zealand emerged as winners of the 2008 OFC Nations Cup, ahead of New Caledonia, and thus qualified for the 2009 FIFA Confederations Cup and a playoff with the fifth placed team from the AFC for a place in the 2010 FIFA World Cup.

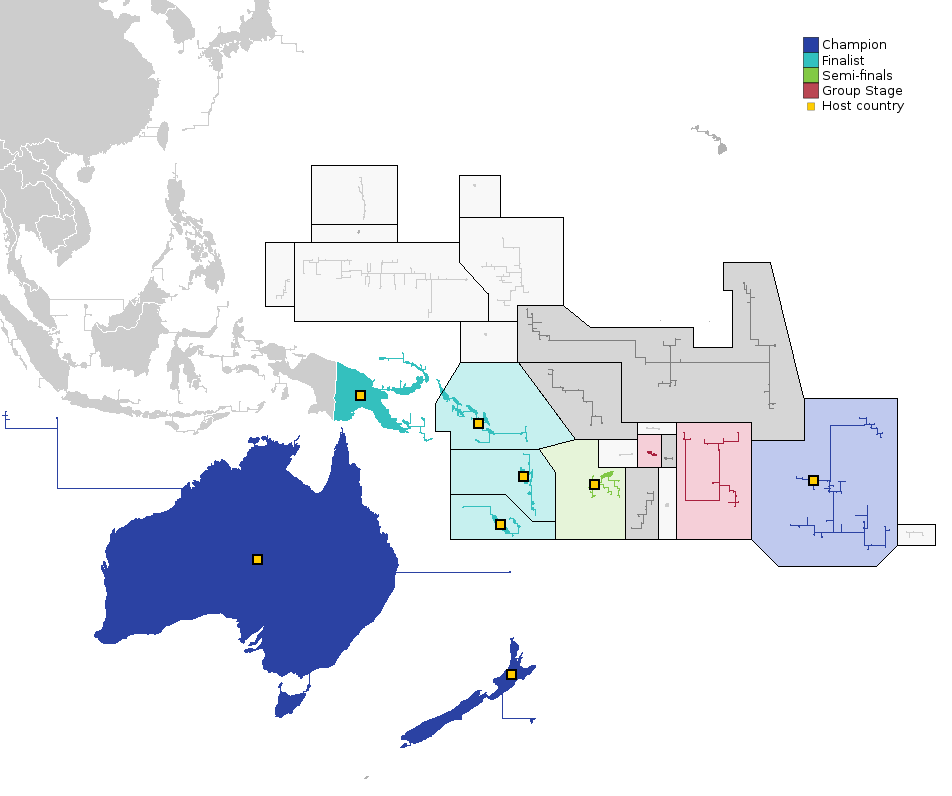
Map of countries' best results. 3 countries have won, counting Australia that it is no longer a member of the OFC. Dark gray means never qualified. Some nations with a yellow square did host a whole tournament.

Year	Teams	Matches	Format
1973	5	12	round-robin group of 5, 3rd-place match, final
1980	8	14	2 groups of 4, 3rd-place match, final
1996	4	6	two-legged semi-finals, two-legged final
1998	6	10	2 groups of 3, semi-finals, 3rd-place match, final
2000	6	10	2 groups of 3, semi-finals, 3rd-place match, final
2002	8	16	2 groups of 4, semi-finals, 3rd-place match, final
2004	6	17	round-robin group of 6, two-legged final
2008	4	12	double round-robin group of 4
2012	8	16	2 groups of 4, semi-finals, 3rd-place match, final
2016	8	15	2 groups of 4, semi-finals, final
2024	7	13	2 groups of 3–4, semi-finals, 3rd-place match, final

== Results ==
Ed.	Year	Host	Final			Third place match or losing semi-finalists			Number of teams
Ed.	Year	Host	Champion	Score	Runner-up	Third place	Score	Fourth place	Number of teams
1	1973	New Zealand	New Zealand	2–0	Tahiti	New Caledonia	2–1	New Hebrides	5
2	1980	New Caledonia	Australia	4–2	Tahiti	New Caledonia	2–1	Fiji	8
3	1996	(various)	Australia	6–0; 5–0	Tahiti	New Zealand and Solomon Islands			4
4	1998	Australia	New Zealand	1–0	Australia	Fiji	4–2	Tahiti	6
5	2000	Tahiti	Australia	2–0	New Zealand	Solomon Islands	2–1	Vanuatu	6
6	2002	New Zealand	New Zealand	1–0	Australia	Tahiti	1–0	Vanuatu	8
7	2004	Australia	Australia	5–1; 6–0	Solomon Islands	New Zealand	Round robin	Fiji	6
8	2008	(various)	New Zealand	Round robin	New Caledonia	Fiji	Round robin	Vanuatu	4
9	2012	Solomon Islands	Tahiti	1–0	New Caledonia	New Zealand	4–3	Solomon Islands	8
10	2016	Papua New Guinea	New Zealand	0–0 (4–2 p)	Papua New Guinea	New Caledonia and Solomon Islands			8
11	~~2020~~	~~New Zealand~~	(Cancelled due to COVID-19 pandemic in Oceania)						~~8~~
12	2024	Fiji; Vanuatu	New Zealand	3–0	Vanuatu	Tahiti	2–1	Fiji	7

- 2004 tournament was held as a round-robin tournament in Australia followed by the final by two teams of home and away.

== Summary ==
Team	Winner	Runners-up	Third place	Fourth place	Semi-finalist	Top 4 Total
New Zealand	6 (**1973**, 1998, **2002**, **2008**, 2016, 2024)	1 (2000)	2 (2004, 2012)	—N/a	1 (**1996**)	10
Australia^{1}	4 (1980, **1996**, 2000, **2004**)	2 (**1998**, 2002)	—N/a	—N/a	—N/a	6
Tahiti	1 (2012)	3 (1973, 1980, 1996)	2 (2002, 2024)	1 (1998)	—N/a	7
New Caledonia	—N/a	2 (**2008**, 2012)	2 (1973, **1980**)	—N/a	1 (2016)	5
Solomon Islands	—N/a	1 (2004)	1 (2000)	1 (**2012**)	2 (**1996**, 2016)	5
Papua New Guinea	—N/a	1 (**2016**)	—N/a	—N/a	—N/a	1
Vanuatu	—N/a	1 (**2024**)	—N/a	4 (1973, 2000, 2002, **2008**)	—N/a	5
Fiji	—N/a	—N/a	2 (1998, **2008**)	3 (1980, 2004, **2024**)	—N/a	5

Notes:

Bold text denotes team was host country.
^{1} Australia left the OFC in 2006 and became a full member of the AFC.

== Awards ==
There are currently four post-tournament awards

- the Best Player for most valuable player;
- the Top Goalscorer for most prolific goal scorer;
- the Best Goalkeeper for most outstanding goalkeeper;
- the Fair Play Award for the team with the best record of fair play.
