= 1998 OFC Nations Cup =

Coordinates: 27°27′53″S 153°0′34″E

Tournament details
- Host country: Australia
- Dates: 25 September – 4 October
- Teams: 6 (from 1 confederation)
- Venue: 1 (in 1 host city)

Final positions
- Champions: New Zealand (2nd title)
- Runners-up: Australia
- Third place: Fiji
- Fourth place: Tahiti

Tournament statistics
- Matches played: 10
- Goals scored: 52 (5.2 per match)
- Attendance: 20,200 (2,020 per match)
- Top scorer: (Australia) Damian Mori (10 goals)

The 1998 OFC Nations Cup was held in Brisbane, Australia. The six participating teams were Australia and New Zealand who qualified as of right, Fiji and Vanuatu who qualified from the Melanesia Cup, and Tahiti and the Cook Islands who qualified from the Polynesia Cup. New Zealand beat an Australian team lacking most of their best internationals 1–0 in the final, while Fiji defeated Tahiti for third place.

== Qualification ==
1998 Melanesia Cup
Pos	Team	Pld	Pts
1	Fiji (C)	4	10
2	Vanuatu (H)	4	7
3	Solomon Islands	4	7
4	Papua New Guinea	4	4
5	New Caledonia	4	0

(C) Champions;
(H) Hosts

1998 Polynesia Cup
Pos	Team	Pld	Pts
1	Tahiti (C)	4	12
2	Cook Islands (H)	4	7
3	Samoa	4	6
4	Tonga	4	4
5	American Samoa	4	0

(C) Champions;
(H) Hosts

=== Qualified teams ===
Team	Qualified as
Australia	Automatically qualified
New Zealand	Automatically qualified
Fiji	1998 Melanesia Cup winner
Vanuatu	1998 Melanesia Cup runners-up
Tahiti	1998 Polynesia Cup winner
Cook Islands	1998 Polynesia Cup runners-up

== Venues ==
Brisbane
Lang Park
Capacity: 52,500
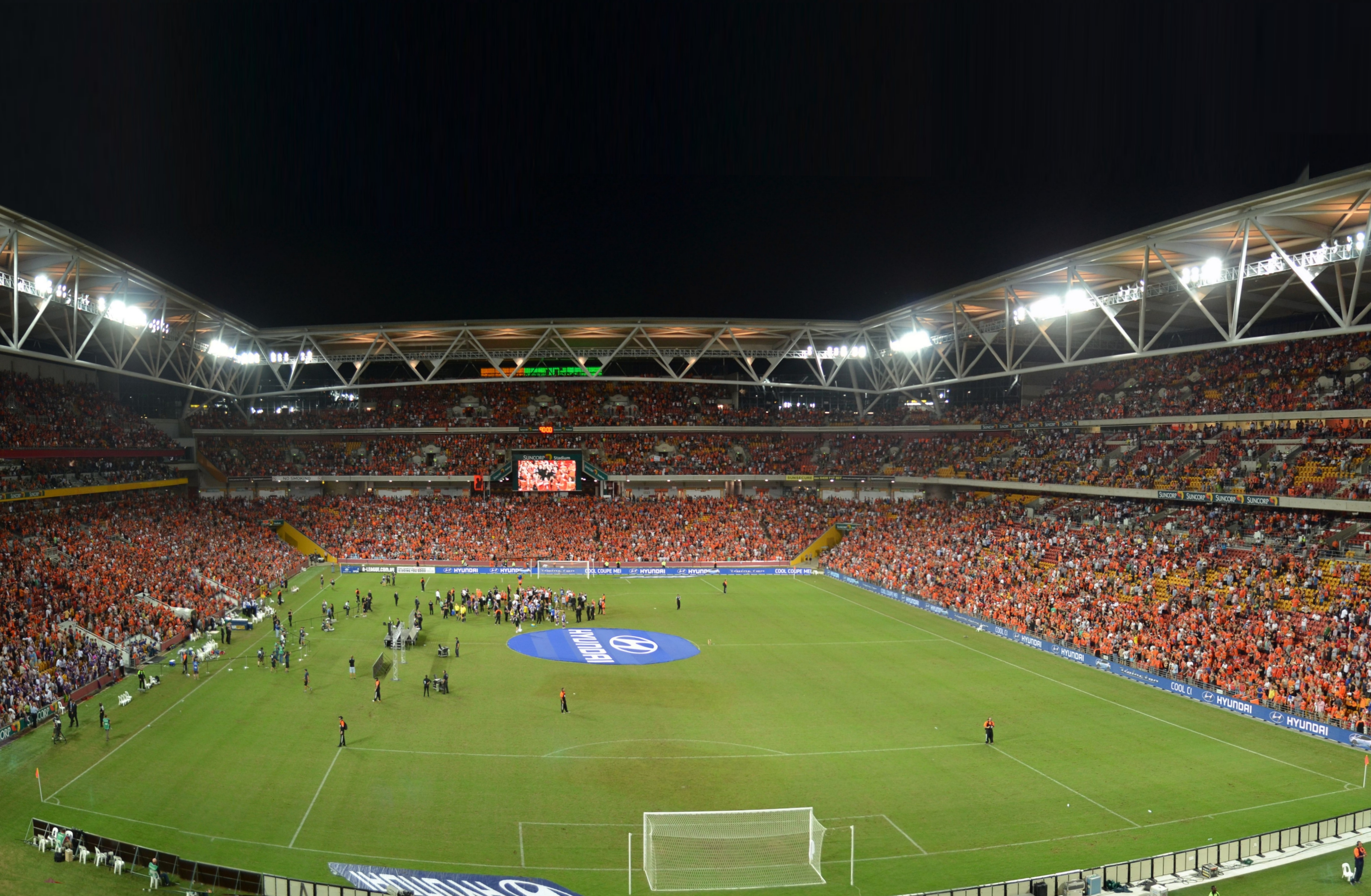

== Squads ==
See 1998 OFC Nations Cup squads.

== Group stage ==
=== Group A ===
Pos	Team	Pld	W	D	L	GF	GA	GD	Pts	Qualification
1	New Zealand	2	2	0	0	9	1	+8	6	Advance to knockout stage
2	Tahiti	2	1	0	1	5	2	+3	3	Advance to knockout stage
3	Vanuatu	2	0	0	2	2	13	−11	0	

25 September 1998

New Zealand	1–0	Tahiti
Paama 13' (o.g.)	Report

Lang Park, Brisbane
Attendance: 900
Referee: Simon Micallef (Australia)

28 September 1998

New Zealand	8–1	Vanuatu
Christie 1'; Coveny 11', 25', 39', 40'; Ryan 34', 65'; Bunce 65'	Report	Roronamahava 45'

Lang Park, Brisbane
Attendance: 500
Referee: Intaz Shah (Fiji)

30 September 1998

Tahiti	5–1	Vanuatu
Quennet 9', 10', 74'; Zaveroni 54'; Amaru 75'	Report	Rarai 82'

Lang Park, Brisbane
Attendance: 400
Referee: Simon Micallef (Australia)

=== Group B ===
Pos	Team	Pld	W	D	L	GF	GA	GD	Pts	Qualification
1	Australia (H)	2	2	0	0	19	1	+18	6	Advance to knockout stage
2	Fiji	2	1	0	1	4	3	+1	3	Advance to knockout stage
3	Cook Islands	2	0	0	2	0	19	−19	0	

(H) Hosts
25 September 1998

Australia	3–1	Fiji
Mori 2', 25', 44'	Report	Masinisau 62'

Lang Park, Brisbane
Attendance: 900
Referee: Bruce Grimshaw (New Zealand)

28 September 1998

Australia	16–0	Cook Islands
Trimboli 1', 12', 63'; Mori 8', 15', 30', 34'; Maloney 17', 89'; Ceccoli 42'; Trajanovski 48', 68', 76' (pen.), 88'; Chipperfield 66'; Halpin 80'	Report

Lang Park, Brisbane
Attendance: 600
Referee: Massimo Raveino (Tahiti)

30 September 1998

Fiji	3–0	Cook Islands
Dickinson 18' (o.g.); Kilalwaca 54'; Nasema 85'	Report

Lang Park, Brisbane
Attendance: 500
Referee: Bruce Grimshaw (New Zealand)

== Knockout stage ==
Semi-finals
2 October 1998 – Brisbane
New Zealand	1
Fiji	0
2 October 1998 – Brisbane
Australia	4
Tahiti	1

Final
4 October 1998 – Brisbane
New Zealand	1
Australia	0
Third place
4 October 1998 – Brisbane
Fiji	4
Tahiti	2

=== Semifinals ===
2 October 1998

New Zealand	1–0	Fiji
Hay 88'	Report

Lang Park, Brisbane
Attendance: 1,200
Referee: Massimo Raveino (Tahiti)

2 October 1998

Australia	4–1	Tahiti
Mori 1', 32', 81'; Veart 86'	Report	Labaste 55'

Lang Park, Brisbane
Attendance: 1,200
Referee: Intaz Shah (Fiji)

=== Third place match ===
4 October 1998

Fiji	4–2	Tahiti
Masi 26', 31'; Lal 28'; Seruvatu 43'	Report	Rousseau 81', 82'

Lang Park, Brisbane
Attendance: 2,000
Referee: Simon Micallef (Australia)

=== Final ===
4 October 1998

New Zealand	1–0	Australia
Burton 24'	Report

Lang Park, Brisbane
Attendance: 12,000
Referee: Massimo Raveino (Tahiti)

== Goalscorers ==
10 goals

- (Australia) Damian Mori

4 goals

- (Australia) Kris Trajanovski
- (New Zealand) Vaughan Coveny

3 goals

- (Australia) Paul Trimboli
- (Fiji) Esala Masi
- (French Polynesia) Gerald Quennet

2 goals

- (Australia) Brad Maloney
- (New Zealand) Rupert Ryan
- (French Polynesia) Jean-Loup Rousseau

1 goal

- (Australia) Alvin Ceccoli
- (Australia) Carl Veart
- (Australia) Scott Chipperfield
- (Australia) Troy Halpin
- (Fiji) Kameli Kilalwaca
- (Fiji) Shailend Lal
- (Fiji) Ulaisi Seruvatu
- (Fiji) Valerio Nasema
- (New Zealand) Che Bunce
- (New Zealand) Danny Hay
- (New Zealand) Mark Burton
- (New Zealand) Tinol Christie
- (French Polynesia) Harold Amaru
- (French Polynesia) Hiro Labaste
- (French Polynesia) Teva Zaveroni
- (Vanuatu) Edwin Rarai
- (Vanuatu) Peter Roronamahava

Own goal

- (French Polynesia) Heimana Paama (playing against New Zealand)
- (Cook Islands) Heath Dickinson (playing against Fiji)
