= 2002 OFC Nations Cup =

2002 OFC Kapu o Kīngitanga

Tournament details
- Host country: New Zealand
- Dates: 5–14 July
- Teams: 8 (from 1 confederation)
- Venue: 2 (in 1 host city)

Final positions
- Champions: New Zealand (3rd title)
- Runners-up: Australia
- Third place: Tahiti
- Fourth place: Vanuatu

Tournament statistics
- Matches played: 16
- Goals scored: 64 (4 per match)
- Attendance: 16,700 (1,044 per match)
- Top scorer: (Australia) Joel Porter (6 goals)

The 2002 OFC Nations Cup took place in New Zealand, between 5 and 14 July 2002.

The competition was divided into two group stages, with a knockout tournament at the end. Before the tournament, 11 of the nations were seeded according to their 2001 FIFA ranking, while New Caledonia was placed last by default, as it was not a FIFA member.

The six lowest-ranked teams took part in the first stage of qualifying, in which the two highest placed teams at the end of the round-robin stage gained qualification to the second group stage, made up of the six highest-ranked teams. The remaining eight teams were then split into two groups of four, with the top two nations from each group progressing to the knockout stage.

Australia failed to defend the title they won in 2000. They were beaten by New Zealand in the final, with Ryan Nelsen scoring the winning goal.

== Qualification ==
Teams who automatically entered the 2002 OFC Nations Cup
Team	Rank
Australia (title holders)	48
New Zealand	84
Fiji	123
Tahiti	128
Solomon Islands	134
Vanuatu	169

Teams qualifiled via 2002 OFC Nations Cup qualifying stage
Team	Rank
Papua New Guinea	195
New Caledonia	N/A

== Venues ==
2002 OFC Nations Cup is located in New Zealand
2002 OFC Nations Cup is located in New Zealand	Auckland	
2002 OFC Nations Cup is located in New Zealand	Mount Smart Stadium	North Harbour Stadium
2002 OFC Nations Cup is located in New Zealand	Capacity: 30,000	Capacity: 25,000

== Squads ==
See 2002 OFC Nations Cup squads.

== Group stage ==
=== Group A ===
Pos	Team	Pld	W	D	L	GF	GA	GD	Pts	Qualification
1	Australia	3	3	0	0	21	0	+21	9	Advance to knockout stage
2	Vanuatu	3	2	0	1	2	2	0	6	Advance to knockout stage
3	Fiji	3	1	0	2	2	10	−8	3	
4	New Caledonia	3	0	0	3	1	14	−13	0	

6 July 2002

Fiji	2–1	New Caledonia
Toma 23'; Bukaudi 49'	Report	Sinedo 79'

Mt Smart Stadium, Auckland
Attendance: 1,000
Referee: Derek Rugg (New Zealand)
6 July 2002

Australia	2–0	Vanuatu
Mori 69'; Despotovski 85'	Report

Ericsson Stadium, Auckland
Attendance: 1,000
Referee: Charles Ariiotima (Tahiti)

8 July 2002

Vanuatu	1–0	Fiji
Marango 6'	Report

Ericsson Stadium, Auckland
Attendance: 800
Referee: Joakim Sosongan (Papua New Guinea)
8 July 2002

Australia	11–0	New Caledonia
Despotovski 2', 56' (pen.), 76', 77'; Horvat 15'; Chipperfield 22', 35'; Mori 34'; Costanzo 83'; Porter 86'; Trimboli 90+'	Report

Ericsson Stadium, Auckland
Attendance: 200
Referee: Derek Rugg (New Zealand)

10 July 2002

Vanuatu	1–0	New Caledonia
Iwai 76'	Report

Ericsson Stadium, Auckland
Attendance: 500
Referee: Charles Ariiotima (Tahiti)
10 July 2002

Australia	8–0	Fiji
Milicic 4'; Porter 7', 12', 45', 52'; Juric 36'; Trimboli 46'; De Amicis 89'	Report

Ericsson Stadium, Auckland
Attendance: 1,000
Referee: Derek Rugg (New Zealand)

=== Group B ===
Pos	Team	Pld	W	D	L	GF	GA	GD	Pts	Qualification
1	New Zealand	3	3	0	0	19	2	+17	9	Advance to knockout stage
2	Tahiti	3	2	0	1	6	7	−1	6	Advance to knockout stage
3	Solomon Islands	3	0	1	2	3	9	−6	1	
4	Papua New Guinea	3	0	1	2	2	12	−10	1	

5 July 2002

Papua New Guinea	0–0	Solomon Islands
	Report

North Harbour Stadium, Albany
Attendance: 1,000
Referee: Matthew Breeze (Australia)
5 July 2002

New Zealand	4–0	Tahiti
Nelsen 30'; Vicelich 49'; Urlovic 80'; Campbell 88'	Report

North Harbour Stadium, Albany
Attendance: 1,000
Referee: Harry Attison (Vanuatu)

7 July 2002

Tahiti	3–2	Solomon Islands
Booene 42'; Tagawa 57'; Fatupua-Lecaill 90+'	Report	Daudau 8'; Menapi 25'

North Harbour Stadium, Albany
Attendance: 1,000
Referee: Matthew Breeze (Australia)
7 July 2002

New Zealand	9–1	Papua New Guinea
Killen 9', 10', 28', 51'; Campbell 27', 85'; Nelsen 54'; Burton 87'; De Gregorio 90+'	Report	Aisa 35' (pen.)

North Harbour Stadium, Albany
Attendance: 1,000
Referee: Leone Rakaroi (Fiji)

9 July 2002

Tahiti	3–1	Papua New Guinea
Garcia 29'; Tagawa 49', 64'	Report	Davani 43'

North Harbour Stadium, Albany
Attendance: 800
Referee: Leonie Rakaroi (Fiji)
9 July 2002

New Zealand	6–1	Solomon Islands
Vicelich 28', 45'; Urlovic 42'; Campbell 50', 75'; Burton 88'	Report	Fa'arodo 73'

North Harbour Stadium, Albany
Attendance: 1,000
Referee: Harry Attison (Vanuatu)

== Knockout stage ==
=== Bracket ===
Semi-finals
12 July – Auckland
Australia	2
Tahiti	1
12 July – Auckland
New Zealand	3
Vanuatu	0

Final
14 July – Auckland
Australia	0
New Zealand	1
Third place
14 July – Auckland
Tahiti	1
Vanuatu	0

=== Semi-finals ===
12 July 2002

Australia	2–1 (a.e.t./g.g.)	Tahiti
Porter 88'; Mori 96'	Report	Zaveroni 38'

Ericsson Stadium, Auckland
Attendance: 400
Referee: Derek Rugg (New Zealand)

12 July 2002

New Zealand	3–0	Vanuatu
Burton 13', 65'; Killen 23'	Report

Ericsson Stadium, Auckland
Attendance: 1,000
Referee: Matthew Breeze (Australia)

=== Third place play-off ===
14 July 2002

Tahiti	1–0	Vanuatu
Auraa 65'	Report

Ericsson Stadium, Auckland
Attendance: 1,000
Referee: Leone Rakaroi (Fiji)

=== Final ===
14 July 2002

New Zealand	1–0	Australia
Nelsen 78'	Report

Ericsson Stadium, Auckland
Attendance: 4,000
Referee: Charles Ariiotima (Tahiti)

2002 OFC Nations Cup winners

New Zealand
Third title

== Goalscorers ==
6 goals

- (Australia) Joel Porter

5 goals

- (Australia) Bobby Despotovski
- (New Zealand) Chris Killen
- (New Zealand) Jeff Campbell

4 goals

- (New Zealand) Mark Burton

3 goals

- (Australia) Damian Mori
- (New Zealand) Ivan Vicelich
- (New Zealand) Ryan Nelsen
- (French Polynesia) Felix Tagawa

2 goals

- (Australia) Paul Trimboli
- (Australia) Scott Chipperfield
- (New Zealand) Paul Urlovic

1 goal

- (Australia) Steve Horvat
- (Australia) Angelo Costanzo
- (Australia) Ante Milicic
- (Australia) Ante Juric
- (Australia) Fausto De Amicis
- (Australia) Mehmet Duraković
- (Fiji) Junior Bukaudi
- (Fiji) Veresa Toma
- (New Caledonia) Andre Sinedo
- (New Zealand) Raf de Gregorio
- (Papua New Guinea) Joe Aisa
- (Papua New Guinea) Reginald Davani
- (Solomon Islands) Commins Menapi
- (Solomon Islands) Henry Fa'arodo
- (Solomon Islands) Patterson Daudau
- (French Polynesia) Samuel Garcia
- (French Polynesia) Steve Fatupua-Lecaill
- (French Polynesia) Sylvain Booene
- (French Polynesia) Tetahio Auraa
- (French Polynesia) Teva Zaveroni
- (Vanuatu) Richard Iwai
- (Vanuatu) Willie August Marango
