= 1997–98 Carlton SC season =

Carlton
1997–98 season
- Head Coach: Eddie Krncevic
- Stadium: Optus Oval; Olympic Park
- National Soccer League: 2nd
- National Soccer League Finals: Runners-up
- Top goalscorer: Andrew Vlahos (13)
- Highest home attendance: 10,632 vs. South Melbourne (21 December 1997); National Soccer League
- Lowest home attendance: 1,548 vs. Newcastle Breakers (23 March 1998); National Soccer League
- Average home league attendance: 4,092
- Biggest win: 5–0 vs. South Melbourne (A) (12 April 1998); National Soccer League
- Biggest defeat: 1–3 vs. Wollongong City (A) (28 December 1997); National Soccer League

The 1997–98 season was the first in the National Soccer League for Carlton Soccer Club. Carlton finished 2nd in their National Soccer League season, and lost 2–1 in the Grand Final to South Melbourne.

== Transfers and contracts ==
=== Transfers in ===
No.	Position	Player	Transferred from	Type/fee	Contract length	Date	Ref.
3	MF	Marcus Stergiopoulos	Gippsland Falcons	$25,000	2 years	15 July 1997	

== Players ==
Note: Flags indicate national team as defined under FIFA eligibility rules; some limited exceptions apply. Players may hold more than one non-FIFA nationality.

No.	Pos.	Nation	Player
1	GK	AUS	Dean Anastasiadis
2	DF	AUS	Robert Trajkovski
3	MF	AUS	Marcus Stergiopoulos
4	DF	AUS	Alan Hunter
5	DF	NZL	Sean Douglas
6	DF	AUS	Con Anthopoulos
7	MF	AUS	Kresimir Marusic
10	MF	AUS	Lubo Lapsansky
11	FW	AUS	Andrew Vlahos
12	MF	AUS	Simon Colosimo
13	MF	AUS	Vince Grella
14	MF	AUS	John Markovski
15	DF	AUS	David Cervinski

No.	Pos.	Nation	Player
16	DF	AUS	Branko Bacak
17	MF	NZL	Mark Atkinson
18	DF	AUS	David Della Rocca
20	GK	AUS	Adrian Cagalj
23	MF	AUS	Mark Bresciano
25	FW	AUS	Adrian Cervinski
—	DF	AUS	Steve Horvat
—	MF	AUS	David Grbac
—	MF	AUS	Cameron Pino
—	MF	AUS	Pece Siveski
—	FW	AUS	Alex Josifoski
—	FW	AUS	Vlado Mirković

== Competitions ==
=== Overall record ===
Competition	First match	Last match	Starting round	Final position	Record							
Competition	First match	Last match	Starting round	Final position	Pld	W	D	L	GF	GA	GD	Win %
National Soccer League	4 October 1997	12 April 1998	Matchday 1	2nd	26	12	9	5	44	24	+20	46.15
National Soccer League Finals	3 May 1998	16 May 1998	Semi-finals	Runners-up	4	1	0	3	3	5	−2	25.00
Total					30	13	9	8	47	29	+18	43.33

Source: Competitions

=== National Soccer League ===
==== League table ====
Pos	Team	Pld	W	D	L	GF	GA	GD	Pts	Qualification
1	South Melbourne (C)	26	13	9	4	56	41	+15	48	Qualification for the Finals series
2	Carlton	26	12	9	5	44	24	+20	45	Qualification for the Finals series
3	Adelaide City	26	13	4	9	45	30	+15	43	Qualification for the Finals series
4	Sydney United	26	11	10	5	37	26	+11	43	Qualification for the Finals series
5	Marconi Fairfield	26	12	7	7	33	25	+8	43	Qualification for the Finals series
6	Wollongong Wolves	26	13	3	10	51	33	+18	42	Qualification for the Finals series
7	Melbourne Knights	26	11	6	9	37	35	+2	39	
8	Perth Glory	26	10	6	10	35	40	−5	36	
9	UTS Olympic	26	10	5	11	37	43	−6	35	
10	West Adelaide	26	10	4	12	32	38	−6	34	
11	Gippsland Falcons	26	8	7	11	28	36	−8	31	
12	Brisbane Strikers	26	6	5	15	23	40	−17	23	
13	Newcastle Breakers	26	4	9	13	30	50	−20	21	
14	Canberra Cosmos	26	3	8	15	29	56	−27	17	

Source: rsssf.com
Rules for classification: 1) points; 2) goal difference; 3) number of goals scored.
(C) Champions

==== Results summary ====
Overall								Home						Away					
Pld	W	D	L	GF	GA	GD	Pts	W	D	L	GF	GA	GD	W	D	L	GF	GA	GD
26	12	9	5	44	24	+20	45	6	4	3	21	12	+9	6	5	2	23	12	+11

Source: worldfootball.net

==== Results by round ====
Round	1	2	3	4	5	6	7	8	9	10	11	12	13	14	15	16	17	18	19	20	21	22	23	24	25	26
Ground	H	H	A	H	A	H	A	H	A	H	A	H	A	H	A	A	H	A	H	A	H	A	H	A	H	A
Result	W	D	W	W	W	D	D	L	W	D	D	L	L	W	D	D	W	D	D	W	L	L	W	W	W	W
Position	5	5	3	1	1	2	2	4	3	3	4	4	4	4	5	5	4	4	5	4	4	7	4	4	3	2

Source: worldfootball.net
A = Away; H = Home; W = Win; D = Draw; L = Loss

==== Matches ====
Win Draw Loss

4 October 1997 1	Carlton	2–1	Perth Glory	Melbourne
	Cervinski 6'; Allsopp 57'	Report	C. Naven 41'	Stadium: Optus Oval; Attendance: 5,897; Referee: Gerry Connolly

12 October 1997 2	Carlton	1–1	Sydney United	Melbourne
	Lapsansky 45'	Report	Burns 29'	Stadium: Optus Oval; Attendance: 4,279; Referee: Matthew Breeze

18 October 1997 3	Canberra Cosmos	1–3	Carlton	Queanbeyan
	Musitano 68'	Report	Anthopoulos 19'; Lapsansky 49'; Allsopp 60'	Stadium: Seiffert Oval; Attendance: 3,505; Referee: B. McKay

25 October 1997 4	Carlton	3–1	Adelaide City	Melbourne
	Markovski 25', 65'; Vlahos 84'	Report	Mori 35'	Stadium: Optus Oval; Attendance: 5,137; Referee: Gerry Connolly

1 November 1997 5	Brisbane Strikers	0–1	Carlton	Brisbane
		Report	Vlahos 26'	Stadium: Suncorp Stadium; Attendance: 5,070; Referee: Mark Shield

8 November 1997 6	Carlton	1–1	Melbourne Knights	Melbourne
	Atkinson 55'	Report	Kelic 44'	Stadium: Optus Oval; Attendance: 6,057; Referee: Simon Micallef

14 November 1997 7	Newcastle Breakers	0–0	Carlton	Newcastle
		Report		Stadium: Topper Stadium; Attendance: 3,284; Referee: Con Diomis

22 November 1997 8	Carlton	0–1	UTS Olympic	Melbourne
		Report	Tome 51'	Stadium: Optus Oval; Attendance: 3,105; Referee: Eugene Brazzale

28 November 1997 9	Marconi-Fairfield	1–2	Carlton	Sydney
	Babic 68'	Report	Casserly 9' (o.g.); Markovski 27'	Stadium: Marconi Stadium; Attendance: 3,386; Referee: Brett Hugo

6 December 1997 10	Carlton	1–1	Adelaide Sharks	Melbourne
	Vlahos 46'	Report	Cardozo 87'	Stadium: Optus Oval; Attendance: 2,709; Referee: Gerry Connolly

13 December 1997 11	Gippsland Falcons	0–0	Carlton	Morwell
		Report		Stadium: Falcons Park; Attendance: 4,123; Referee: B. Panella

21 December 1997 12	Carlton	2–3	South Melbourne	Melbourne
	Grella 8'; Colosimo 78'	Report	Anastasiadis 30'; Boutsianis 37'; Curcija 80' (pen.)	Stadium: Optus Oval; Attendance: 10,632; Referee: Simon Micallef

28 December 1997 13	Wollongong City	3–1	Carlton	Wollongong
	Perinich 22'; Surjan 26' (pen.); Ceccoli 42'	Report	Markovski ?'	Stadium: Brandon Park; Attendance: 6,235; Referee: G. Leverton

3 January 1998 14	Carlton	1–0	Wollongong City	Melbourne
	Markovski 21'	Report		Stadium: Optus Oval; Attendance: 2,371; Referee: Gerry Connolly

11 January 1998 15	Perth Glory	0–0	Carlton	Perth
		Report		Stadium: Perth Oval; Attendance: 14,687; Referee: Mark Shield

18 January 1998 16	Sydney United	1–1	Carlton	Sydney
	Kupresak 48'	Report	Lapsansky 38'	Stadium: Parramatta Stadium; Attendance: 3,333; Referee: Brett Hugo

24 January 1998 17	Carlton	2–0	Canberra Cosmos	Melbourne
	Markovski 34'; Allsopp 68'	Report		Stadium: Optus Oval; Attendance: 2,476; Referee: J. Blaney

1 February 1998 18	Adelaide City	1–1	Carlton	Adelaide
	Hassell 72'	Report	Gibson 3' (o.g.)	Stadium: Hindmarsh Stadium; Attendance: 4,605; Referee: Simon Micallef

21 February 1998 19	Carlton	1–1	Brisbane Strikers	Melbourne
	Lapsansky 36'	Report	Meredith 53'	Stadium: Optus Oval; Attendance: 2,716; Referee: Matthew Breeze

1 March 1998 20	Melbourne Knights	2–4	Carlton	Melbourne
	Pondeljak 18' (pen.); Anastasiadis 66' (o.g.)	Report	Markovski 16', 76'; Vlahos 23'; Anthopoulos 48'	Stadium: Knights Stadium; Attendance: 5,185; Referee: Brett Hugo

7 March 1998 21	Carlton	0–1	Marconi-Fairfield	Melbourne
		Report	Zoric 90+'	Stadium: Optus Oval; Attendance: 2,944; Referee: Mark Shield

13 March 1998 22	UTS Olympic	3–2	Carlton	Sydney
	Tome 5'; N. Carle 28'; L. Carle 75' (pen.)	Report	Vlahos 53'; Mirkovic 66'	Stadium: Belmore Oval; Attendance: 3,588; Referee: G. Leverton

23 March 1998 23	Carlton	3–0	Newcastle Breakers	Melbourne
	Vlahos 55', 85' (pen.); Josifovski 90'	Report		Stadium: Olympic Park; Attendance: 1,548; Referee: Jane Blaney

29 March 1998 24	Adelaide Sharks	0–3	Carlton	Adelaide
		Report	Vlahos 13', 80'; Markovski 86'	Stadium: Hindmarsh Stadium; Attendance: 3,100; Referee: Simon Micallef

5 April 1998 25	Carlton	4–1	Gippsland Falcons	Melbourne
	Vlahos 27', 65', 83' (pen.); Bresciano 71'	Report	Cheney 75'	Stadium: Olympic Park; Attendance: 3,324; Referee: Brett Hugo

12 April 1998 26	South Melbourne	0–5	Carlton	Melbourne
		Report	Vlahos 23'; Markovski 30' (pen.), 39'; Marusic 62'; Bresciano 89'	Stadium: Bob Jane Stadium; Attendance: 8,725; Referee: Eugene Brazzale

==== Finals series ====
26 April 1998 Major semi-final 1st Leg	Carlton	1–2	South Melbourne	Melbourne
	Markovski 90+'	Report	Trimboli 25'; Anastasiadis 35'	Stadium: Optus Oval; Attendance: 6,767; Referee: Brett Hugo

3 May 1998 Major semi-final 2nd Leg	South Melbourne	1–0 (3–1 agg.)	Carlton	Melbourne
	Lozanovski 13'	Report		Stadium: Lakeside Stadium; Attendance: 14,850; Referee: Eddie Lennie

10 May 1998 Preliminary Final	Carlton	1–0	Marconi-Fairfield	Melbourne
	Bresciano 90+'	Report		Stadium: Olympic Park; Attendance: 3,672; Referee: Simon Micallef

16 May 1998 Grand Final	South Melbourne	2–1	Carlton	Melbourne
	Anastasiadis 9'; Boutsianis 87'	Report	Stergiopoulos 78'	Stadium: Olympic Park; Attendance: 16,000; Referee: Eugene Brazzale

== Statistics ==
=== Appearances and goals ===
Includes all competitions. Players with no appearances not included in the list.

No.	Pos	Nat	Player	Total		National Soccer League		National Soccer League Finals	
No.	Pos	Nat	Player	Apps	Goals	Apps	Goals	Apps	Goals
1	GK	(Australia) AUS	Dean Anastasiadis	30	0	26	0	4	0
2	DF	(Australia) AUS	Robert Trajkovski	22	0	17+2	0	3	0
3	MF	(Australia) AUS	Marcus Stergiopoulos	26	1	17+6	0	0+3	1
4	DF	(Australia) AUS	Alan Hunter	6	0	4+2	0	0	0
5	DF	(New Zealand) NZL	Sean Douglas	29	0	26	0	3	0
6	DF	(Australia) AUS	Con Anthopoulos	25	2	23	2	2	0
7	MF	(Australia) AUS	Kresimir Marusic	22	1	17+1	1	4	0
10	MF	(Australia) AUS	Lubo Lapsansky	26	4	20+2	4	3+1	0
11	FW	(Australia) AUS	Andrew Vlahos	30	13	23+3	13	4	0
12	MF	(Australia) AUS	Simon Colosimo	21	1	15+2	1	4	0
13	MF	(Australia) AUS	Vince Grella	22	1	16+4	1	1+1	0
14	MF	(Australia) AUS	John Markovski	24	12	20	11	4	1
15	DF	(Australia) AUS	David Cervinski	24	1	18+2	1	4	0
16	DF	(Australia) AUS	Branko Bacak	10	0	2+8	0	0	0
17	MF	(New Zealand) NZL	Mark Atkinson	28	1	23+2	1	3	0
18	DF	(Australia) AUS	David Della Rocca	10	0	2+7	0	1	0
23	MF	(Australia) AUS	Mark Bresciano	14	2	8+2	2	3+1	0
25	FW	(Australia) AUS	Adrian Cervinski	8	0	2+3	0	1+2	0
	MF	(Australia) AUS	David Grbac	1	0	0+1	0	0	0
	MF	(Australia) AUS	Cameron Pino	1	0	0+1	0	0	0
	MF	(Australia) AUS	Pece Siveski	1	0	0+1	0	0	0
	FW	(Australia) AUS	Alex Josifoski	5	1	1+4	1	0	0
	FW	(Australia) AUS	Vlado Mirković	3	0	0+3	0	0	0

- Source: worldfootball.net
