= List of Carlton SC players =

Carlton Soccer Club, an association football club based in Jolimont, Melbourne, was founded in 1997. They were admitted into the National Soccer League for the 1997–98 season. They dissolved in 2000 and effectively left the 2000–01 National Soccer League after eight matches.

Dean Anastasiadis held the record for the greatest number of appearances for Carlton. The Australian goalkeeper played 92 times for the club. The club's goalscoring record was held by Alex Moreira who scored 27 goals.

== Key ==
- The list is ordered first by date of debut, and then if necessary in alphabetical order.
- Appearances as a substitute are included.

Positions key
GK	Goalkeeper
DF	Defender
MF	Midfielder
FW	Forward

Nationality
Unless otherwise noted, the nationality of a player is determined by the country/countries which he has played for, or if said person has not played international football, their country of birth.
Club career
Club career is defined as the first and last calendar years in which the player appeared for the club in any of the competitions listed below.
Total appearances and Total goals
Total appearances and goals comprise those in the National Soccer League.

== Players ==
List of Carlton SC players
Player	Nationality	Pos	Club career	Starts	Subs	Total	Goals
Player	Nationality	Pos	Club career	Appearances			Goals
Dean Anastasiadis	Australia	GK	1997–2000	92	0	92	0
Con Anthopoulos	Australia	DF	1997–2000	55	8	63	2
Danny Allsopp	Australia	FW	1997–1998	5	11	16	3
Mark Atkinson	New Zealand	MF	1997–2000	73	9	82	2
Branko Bacak	Australia	DF	1997–1998	2	9	11	0
David Cervinski	Australia	DF	1997–1999	44	3	47	4
Sean Douglas	New Zealand	DF	1997–2000	80	4	84	0
Vince Grella	Australia	MF	1997–1999	17	6	23	1
Lubomir Lapsansky	Czechoslovakia	MF	1997–2000	84	4	88	8
John Markovski	Australia	FW	1997–1998; 1999–2000	44	17	61	18
Kresimir Marusic	Croatia	MF	1997–1998	21	1	22	1
Marcus Stergiopoulos	Australia	MF	1997–1999	43	10	53	2
Robert Trajkovski	Australia	DF	1997–1998	20	2	22	0
Andrew Vlahos	Australia	FW	1997–1999	39	5	44	15
Andy Vargas	Australia	MF	1997–1998	1	5	6	0
Simon Colosimo	Australia	DF	1997–2000	44	6	50	10
Alan Hunter	Australia	DF	1997–1998	4	2	6	0
David Grbac	Australia	MF	1997–1999	3	8	1	0
David Della Rocca	Australia	DF	1997–2000	9	17	26	0
Alex Josifovski	Australia	FW	1997–1999	2	21	23	2
Mark Bresciano	Australia	MF	1997–1999	29	3	32	7
Cameron Pino	Australia	MF	1997–1999	0	4	4	0
Pece Siveski	Macedonia	MF	1998	0	1	1	0
Vlado Mirkovic	Yugoslavia	FW	1997–1998	0	3	3	1
Adrian Cervinski	Australia	FW	1998	3	5	8	0
Andrew Marth	Australia	MF	1998–2000	64	2	66	18
Alex Moreira	Brazil	FW	1998–2000	40	14	54	27
Joe Tricarico	Australia	MF	1998–2000	28	1	29	8
Robert Markovac	Australia	MF	1998–1999	7	7	14	1
Adrian Cagalj	Australia	GK	1998–1999	12	0	12	0
Serdar Pir	Australia	MF	1999	0	6	6	0
Tony Ouliaris	Australia	MF	1999	2	6	8	0
Archie Thompson	Australia	FW	1999–2000	47	6	53	23
Ace Stojevski	Australia	MF	1999	2	4	6	0
Nick Tolios	Australia	DF	1999	0	4	4	0
Ricki van Steeden	New Zealand	DF	1999	2	0	2	0
Adam Pongho	Australia	MF	1999	0	1	1	0
Izzy Erdogan	Australia	DF	1999	0	1	1	0
Mike Conroy	Scotland	FW	1999–2000	16	12	28	0
Craig Deans	Australia	DF	1999–2000	31	5	36	0
Andrew Packer	Australia	DF	1999–2000	29	9	38	0
Stuart Slater	England	FW	1999–2000	19	6	25	0
Dave McPherson	Scotland	DF	1999–2000	42	0	42	7
David Terminello	Australia	MF	1999–2000	22	16	38	2
Colin Azzopardi	Australia	MF	1999–2000	4	1	5	0
Angelo Motsiopoulos	Australia	FW	1999–2000	2	12	14	1
Joshua Kennedy	Australia	FW	2000	4	0	4	0
Daniel Vasilevski	Australia	MF	2000	7	5	12	1
Steve Horvat	Australia	DF	2000	24	0	24	1
Ivo De Jesus	Australia	MF	2000	2	1	3	0
