= List of Carlton SC records and statistics =

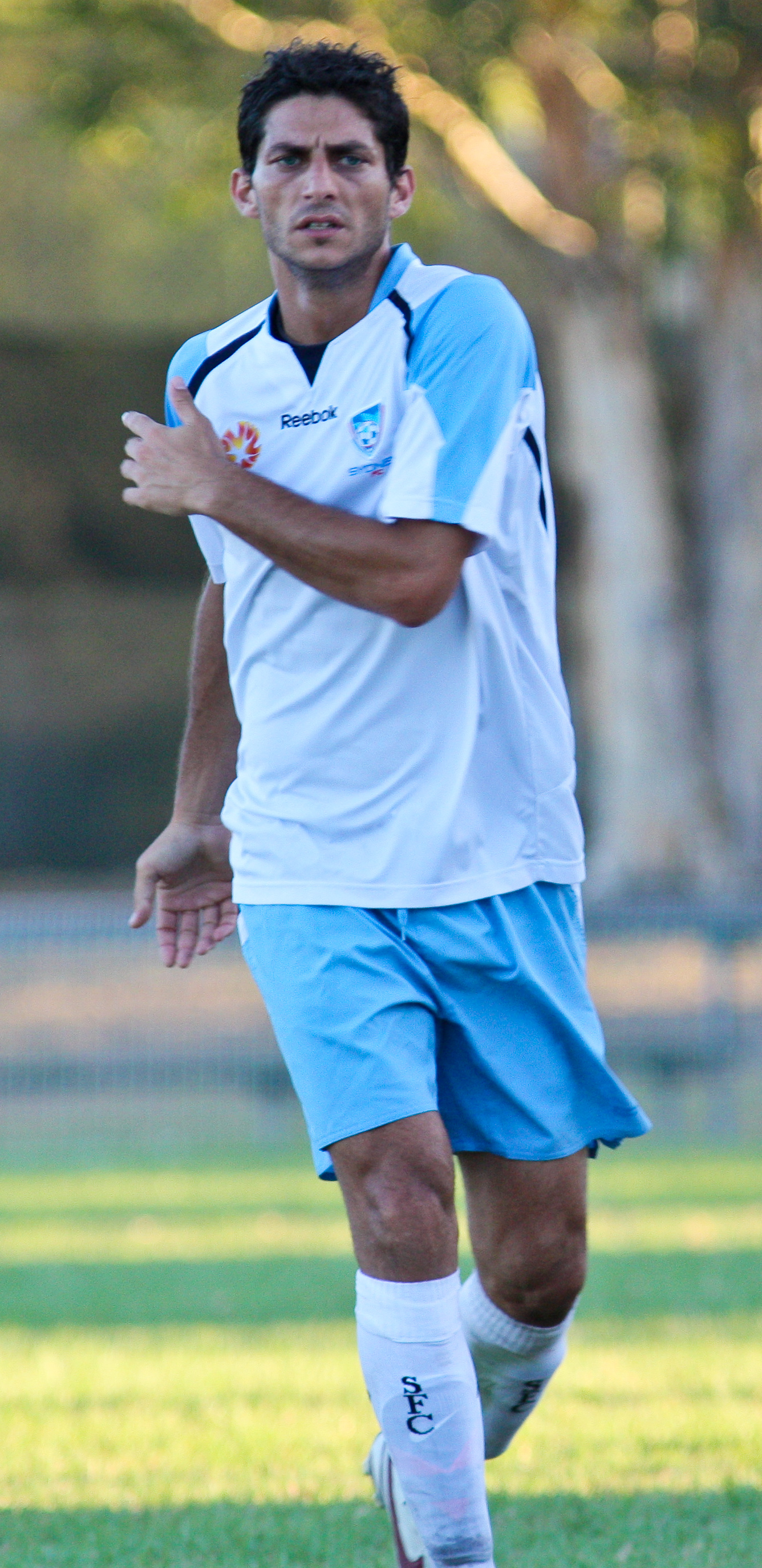
Simon Colosimo received the most international caps as a Carlton player.

Carlton Soccer Club was an Australian semi-professional association football club based in Jolimont, Melbourne in 1997. They were admitted into the National Soccer League in the 1997–98 season for their four seasons in the competition until the club folded in 2000.

The list encompasses the records set by the club, their managers and their players. The player records section itemises the club's leading goalscorers and those who have made most appearances in first-team competitions. It also records notable achievements by Carlton players on the international stage. Attendance records at Carlton are also included.

== Honours and achievements ==
- National Soccer League Premiership

Runners-up (1): 1997–98

- National Soccer League Championship

Runners-up (1): 1998

== Player records ==
=== Appearances ===
==== Most appearances ====
Competitive matches only, includes appearances as substitute. Numbers in brackets indicate goals scored.

Rank	Player	Years	Appearances
1	(Australia) Dean Anastasiadis	1997–2000	92 (0)
2	(Czechoslovakia) Lubomir Lapsansky	1997–2000	88 (8)
3	(New Zealand) Sean Douglas	1997–2000	84 (0)
4	(New Zealand) Mark Atkinson	1997–2000	82 (2)
5	(Australia) Andrew Marth	1998–2000	66 (18)
6	(Australia) Con Anthopoulos	1997–2000	63 (2)
7	(Australia) John Markovski	1997–1998; 1999–2000	61 (18)
8	(Brazil) Alex Moreira	1998–2000	54 (27)
9	(Australia) Marcus Stergiopoulos	1997–1999	53 (2)
9	(Australia) Archie Thompson	1997–1999	53 (23)

=== Goalscorers ===
==== Top goalscorers ====
Alex Moreira was the all-time top goalscorer for Carlton.

Competitive matches only. Numbers in brackets indicate appearances made.

Rank	Player	Years	Goals
1	(Brazil) Alex Moreira	1998–2000	27 (54)
2	(Australia) Archie Thompson	1999–2000	23 (53)
3	(Australia) John Markovski	1998–2000	18 (61)
3	(Australia) Andrew Marth	1998–2000	18 (66)
5	(Australia) Andrew Vlahos	1997–1999	15 (44)
6	(Australia) Simon Colosimo	1997–2000	10 (44)
7	(Australia) Lubomir Lapsansky	1997–2000	8 (88)
7	(Australia) Joe Tricarico	1998–2000	8 (29)
9	(Australia) Mark Bresciano	1997–1999	7 (32)
9	(Australia) David McPherson	1997–1999	7 (42)

=== International ===
This section refers only to caps won while a Carlton player.

- First capped player: John Markovski, for Australia against Chile on 7 February 1998
- Most capped player: Simon Colosimo with 9 caps.

== Club records ==
=== Matches ===
- Record win: 5–0 against South Melbourne, National Soccer League, 12 April 1998
- Record consecutive wins: 6, from 25 April 2000 to 28 May 2000
- Record consecutive defeats: 8, from 28 February 1999 to 25 April 1999

=== Goals ===
- Most NSL goals scored in a season: 55 in 34 matches, National Soccer League, 1999–2000
- Fewest NSL goals scored in a season: 44 in 26 matches, National Soccer League, 1997–98
- Most NSL goals conceded in a season: 47 in 28 matches, National Soccer League, 1998–99
- Fewest NSL goals conceded in a season: 24 in 26 matches, National Soccer League, 1997–98

=== Points ===
- Most points in a season: 58 in 26 matches, National Soccer League, 1999–2000
- Fewest points in a season: 31 in 28 matches, National Soccer League, 1998–99

=== Attendances ===
- Highest attendance at Carlton: 10,632 against South Melbourne, National Soccer League, 21 December 1997
- Lowest attendance at Carlton: 1,548 against Newcastle Breakers, National Soccer League, 23 March 1998
