= 1998 National Soccer League grand final =

1998 National Soccer League Grand Final
- Event: 1997–98 National Soccer League
South Melbourne	Carlton SC
2	1
- Date: 16 May 1998
- Venue: Olympic Park Stadium, Melbourne, Australia
- Man of the Match: Fausto De Amicis (Joe Marston Medal)
- Referee: Eugene Brazzale
- Attendance: 16,000

The 1998 National Soccer League Grand Final was held on 16 May 1998 between South Melbourne and Carlton SC at Olympic Park Stadium. South Melbourne gained home advantage as they won the major semi-final against them two weeks earlier. John Anastasiadis scored in the ninth minute for South Melbourne as they went up 1–0 at the half time break. In the 78th minute, Marcus Stergiopoulos netted a goal for Carlton to equalise, however, an 87th minute winner from Con Boutsianis clinched the victory for South Melbourne, gifting them their third NSL championship. Fausto De Amicis won the Joe Marston Medal.

== Route to the final ==
=== League Standings ===
Pos	Team	Pld	W	D	L	GF	GA	GD	Pts	Qualification or relegation
1	South Melbourne (C)	26	13	9	4	56	41	+15	48	1997-98 National Soccer League Champions
2	Carlton SC	26	12	9	5	44	24	+20	45	1998 National Soccer League Finals
3	Adelaide City	26	13	4	9	45	30	+15	43	1998 National Soccer League Finals
4	Sydney United	26	11	10	5	37	26	+11	43	1998 National Soccer League Finals
5	Marconi Stallions	26	12	7	7	33	25	+8	43	1998 National Soccer League Finals
6	Wollongong Wolves	26	13	3	10	51	33	+18	42	1998 National Soccer League Finals
7	Melbourne Knights	26	11	6	9	37	35	+2	39	
8	Perth Glory	26	10	6	10	35	40	−5	36	
9	UTS Olympic	26	10	5	11	37	43	−6	35	
10	West Adelaide	26	10	4	12	32	38	−6	34	
11	Gippsland Falcons	26	8	7	11	28	36	−8	31	
12	Brisbane Strikers	26	6	5	15	23	40	−17	23	
13	Newcastle Breakers	26	4	9	13	30	50	−20	21	
14	Canberra Cosmos	26	3	8	15	29	56	−27	17	

Source: rsssf.com
Rules for classification: 1) points; 2) goal difference; 3) number of goals scored.
(C) Champions

=== Finals Bracket ===
Elimination Finals
5	Marconi Fairfield	1	0	1
4	Sydney United	0	1	1
6	Wollongong Wolves	3	2	5
3	Adelaide City	0	2	2

Major/Minor Semifinals
2	Carlton	1	0	1
1	South Melbourne	2	1	3
5	Marconi Fairfield	2
6	Wollongong Wolves	1

Preliminary Final
10 May 1998
2	Carlton	1
5	Marconi Fairfield	0

Grand Final
16 May 1998
South Melbourne	2
Carlton	1

== Match ==
=== Details ===
16 May 1998
20:00 AEST

South Melbourne	2 – 1	Carlton SC
Anastasiadis 9'; Boutsianis 87'	Reports	Stergiopoulos 78'

Olympic Park Stadium, Melbourne
Attendance: 16,000
Referee: Eugene Brazzale

GK	1	(Australia) Michael Petkovic
MF	2	(Australia) Steve Iosifidis
DF	3	(Australia) Fausto De Amicis
DF	5	(Australia) Con Blatsis
MF	6	(Australia) David Clarkson
MF	7	(Australia) Steve Panopoulos
FW	9	(Australia) Paul Trimboli (c)
MF	11	(Australia) Bill Damianos
MF	15	(Australia) Goran Lozanovski	(substituted off) 74'
DF	16	(Australia) Tansel Başer
FW	17	(Australia) John Anastasiadis	(substituted off) 85'
Substitutes:
FW	8	(New Zealand) Vaughan Coveny	(substituted on) 74'
FW	10	(Australia) Michael Curcija
MF	12	(Australia) Con Boutsianis	(substituted on) 85'
MF	19	(Australia) George Goutzioulis
Manager:
(Australia) Ange Postecoglou
Joe Marston Medal:
Fausto De Amicis (South Melbourne)

GK	1	(Australia) Dean Anastasiadis
DF	2	(Australia) Rob Trajkovski
DF	5	(New Zealand) Sean Douglas (c)
MF	7	(Croatia) Krešimir Marušić
MF	10	(Australia) Lupo Lapsansky
FW	11	(Australia) Andrew Vlahos	(substituted off) 65'
DF	12	(Australia) Simon Colosimo
FW	14	(Australia) John Markovski
DF	15	(Australia) David Cervinski	(substituted off) 78'
MF	17	(New Zealand) Mark Atkinson
MF	23	(Australia) Mark Bresciano
Substitutes:
MF	3	(Australia) Marcus Stergiopoulos	(substituted on) 78'
FW	9	(Australia) Alex Josifovski
DF	18	(Australia) David Della Rocca
FW	25	(Australia) Adrian Cervinski	(substituted on) 65'
Manager:
(Australia) Eddie Krnčević

Assistant referees:
Fourth official:

Match rules

- 90 minutes.
- 30 minutes of extra time if necessary.
- Penalty shoot-out if scores still level.
