= 1997–98 National Soccer League =

Australian soccer season

NSL 1997-98
- League: National Soccer League
- Sport: Association football
- Duration: 1997–98
- Number of teams: 14

NSL season
- Champions: South Melbourne
- Top scorer: Damian Mori (19)

National Soccer League seasons
- ← 1996–97 1998–99 →

The 1997–98 National Soccer League season, was the 22nd season of the National Soccer League in Australia.

== Overview ==
It was contested by 14 teams, and South Melbourne won the championship. First year Carlton SC competed.

== Regular season ==
=== League table ===
Pos	Team	Pld	W	D	L	GF	GA	GD	Pts	Qualification
1	South Melbourne (C)	26	13	9	4	56	41	+15	48	Qualification for the Finals series
2	Carlton	26	12	9	5	44	24	+20	45	Qualification for the Finals series
3	Adelaide City	26	13	4	9	45	30	+15	43	Qualification for the Finals series
4	Sydney United	26	11	10	5	37	26	+11	43	Qualification for the Finals series
5	Marconi Fairfield	26	12	7	7	33	25	+8	43	Qualification for the Finals series
6	Wollongong Wolves	26	13	3	10	51	33	+18	42	Qualification for the Finals series
7	Melbourne Knights	26	11	6	9	37	35	+2	39	
8	Perth Glory	26	10	6	10	35	40	−5	36	
9	UTS Olympic	26	10	5	11	37	43	−6	35	
10	West Adelaide	26	10	4	12	32	38	−6	34	
11	Gippsland Falcons	26	8	7	11	28	36	−8	31	
12	Brisbane Strikers	26	6	5	15	23	40	−17	23	
13	Newcastle Breakers	26	4	9	13	30	50	−20	21	
14	Canberra Cosmos	26	3	8	15	29	56	−27	17	

Source: rsssf.com
Rules for classification: 1) points; 2) goal difference; 3) number of goals scored.
(C) Champions

== Finals series ==
=== Bracket ===
Elimination Finals
5	Marconi Fairfield	1	1	2
4	Sydney United	0	0	0
6	Wollongong Wolves	3	2	5
3	Adelaide City	0	2	2

Major/Minor semi-finals
2	Carlton	1	0	1
1	South Melbourne	2	1	3
5	Marconi Fairfield	2
6	Wollongong Wolves	1

Preliminary Final
10 May 1998
2	Carlton	1
5	Marconi Fairfield	0

Grand Final
16 May 1998
South Melbourne	2
Carlton	1

- Marconi Fairfield 1-0 : 1-0 Sydney United
- Wollongong Wolves 3-0 : 2-2 Adelaide City
- Marconi Fairfield 2-1 Wollongong Wolves
- Carlton 1-2 : 0-1 South Melbourne
- Carlton 1-0 Marconi Fairfield

=== Grand Final ===
16 May 1998
20:00 AEST

South Melbourne	2 – 1	Carlton SC
Anastasiadis 9'; Boutsianis 87'	(report)	Stergiopoulos 78'

Olympic Park Stadium, Melbourne
Attendance: 16,000
Referee: Eugene Brazzale

SOUTH MELBOURNE:
GK	1	(Australia) Michael Petkovic
MF	2	(Australia) Steve Iosifidis
DF	3	(Australia) Fausto De Amicis
DF	5	(Australia) Con Blatsis
MF	6	(Australia) David Clarkson
MF	7	(Australia) Steve Panopoulos
FW	9	(Australia) Paul Trimboli (c)
MF	11	(Australia) Bill Damianos
MF	15	(Australia) Goran Lozanovski	(substituted off) 74'
DF	16	(Australia) Tansel Başer
FW	17	(Australia) John Anastasiadis	(substituted off) 85'
Substitutes:
FW	8	(New Zealand) Vaughan Coveny	(substituted in) 74'
FW	10	(Australia) Michael Curcija
MF	12	(Australia) Con Boutsianis	(substituted in) 85'
MF	19	(Australia) George Goutzioulis
Manager:
(Australia) Ange Postecoglou
Joe Marston Medal:
(Australia) Fausto De Amicis

CARLTON SC:
GK	1	(Australia) Dean Anastasiadis
DF	2	(Australia) Rob Trajkovski
DF	5	(New Zealand) Sean Douglas (c)
MF	7	(Australia) Krešimir Marušić
MF	10	(Australia) Lupo Lapsansky
FW	11	(Australia) Andrew Vlahos	(substituted off) 65'
DF	12	(Australia) Simon Colosimo
FW	14	(Australia) John Markovski
DF	15	(Australia) David Cervinski	(substituted off) 78'
MF	17	(New Zealand) Mark Atkinson
MF	23	(Australia) Mark Bresciano
Substitutes:
MF	3	(Australia) Marcus Stergiopoulos	(substituted in) 78'
FW	9	(Australia) Alex Josifovski
DF	18	(Australia) David Della Rocca
FW	25	(Australia) Adrian Cervinski	(substituted in) 65'
Manager:
(Australia) Eddie Krnčević
