= List of Carlton SC seasons =

Carlton Soccer Club was an Australian semi-professional association football club based in Joimont, Melbourne. The club was formed in 1997 and joined the National Soccer League in the 1997–98 season until they were disbanded from the 2000–01 National Soccer League and became defunct. The club's first team spent four seasons in the National Soccer League. The table details the club's achievements in major competitions, and the top scorers for each season.

== History ==
Carlton's inaugural season in 1997–98 saw the club finish regular season runners-up against South Melbourne and qualify for their first Grand Final losing 2–1 against South Melbourne with Carlton claiming the two runners-up medals. The next season in 1998–99 had the team miss out on the Finals series finishing 11th out of 15. Carlton had qualified for the Finals series the next season in 1999–2000 finished 3rd but being eliminated in the Preliminary Final by Wollongong Wolves. This was to be the club's last completed season, as the 2000–01 season saw the club become defunct after playing just eight rounds in the 2000–01 National Soccer League season and effectively forfeiting all results in the league being awarded 3–0 losses.

== Key ==
Key to league competitions:

- National Soccer League (NSL) – Australia's former top football league, established in 1977 and dissolved in 2004.

Key to colours and symbols:

1st or W	Winners
2nd or RU	Runners-up
3rd	Third place
♦	Top scorer in division

Key to league record:

- Season = The year and article of the season
- Pos = Final position
- Pld = Matches played
- W = Matches won
- D = Matches drawn
- L = Matches lost
- GF = Goals scored
- GA = Goals against
- Pts = Points

== Seasons ==
Results of league and cup competitions by season
Season	Division	Pld	W	D	L	GF	GA	Pts	Pos	Finals	Name(s)	Goals
Season	League									Finals	Top goalscorer(s)	
1997–98	NSL	26	12	9	5	44	24	45	2nd	RU	Andrew Vlahos	11
1998–99	NSL	28	9	4	15	47	47	31	11th	DNQ	Alex Moreira	12
1999–2000	NSL	34	17	7	10	55	39	58	3rd	PF	Alex Moreira	15
2000–01 (Note: When Carlton became defunct, the club forfeited all results in the 2000–01 National Soccer League with all matches being awarded 3–0 losses.)	NSL	30	0	0	30	0	90	0	16th	DNQ	Archie Thompson	6
