= 1998–99 Northern Spirit FC season =

Northern Spirit
1998–99 season
- National Soccer League: 5th
- NSL Finals series: Elimination-finals
- Highest home attendance: 18,985 vs. Sydney Olympic (9 October 1998); National Soccer League
- Lowest home attendance: 8,328 vs. Carlton (14 February 1999); National Soccer League
- Average home league attendance: 14,632
- Biggest win: 4–0 vs. Marconi Fairfield (15 January 1999); National Soccer League
- Biggest defeat: 1–5 vs. Brisbane Strikers (6 February 1999); National Soccer League

The 1998–99 season was the first season in the history of Northern Spirit (now North West Sydney Spirit). It was also the first season in the National Soccer League. Northern Spirit finished 5th in their National Soccer League season, and were eliminated in the NSL Finals series elimination-final first round by Marconi Fairfield.

== Players ==
Note: Flags indicate national team as defined under FIFA eligibility rules; some limited exceptions apply. Players may hold more than one non-FIFA nationality.

No.	Pos.	Nation	Player
—	FW	AUS	Graham Arnold
—	MF	AUS	Paul Bilokapic
—	MF	AUS	Matthew Bingley
—	DF	AUS	Eddy Bosnar
—	DF	AUS	Luke Casserly
—	MF	AUS	Troy Cranney
—	MF	ENG	Ian Crook
—	DF	AUS	Michael Cunico
—	MF	AUS	Robert Enes
—	MF	AUS	Anthony Faria
—	MF	AUS	Paul Foster
—	GK	AUS	Paul Henderson
—	MF	AUS	Matthew Langdon

No.	Pos.	Nation	Player
—	MF	CRO	Kresimir Marusic
—	MF	AUS	Gabriel Mendez
—	DF	ENG	Phil Moss
—	MF	AUS	Adem Poric
—	DF	AUS	Nick Purdue
—	DF	AUS	Marko Rudan
—	DF	AUS	Robbie Slater
—	MF	AUS	Adam Snyder
—	MF	AUS	Jack Sobczyk
—	MF	AUS	James Stubbs-Mills
—	FW	AUS	Daniel Watkins
—	DF	AUS	Paul Wearne
—	FW	AUS	Clayton Zane

== Transfers ==
=== Transfers in ===
No.	Position	Player	Transferred from	Type/fee	Date	Ref
—	FW	Graham Arnold	(Japan) Sanfrecce Hiroshima		July 1998	
—	MF	Paul Bilokapic	Sydney United		July 1998	
—	DF	Eddy Bosnar	Newcastle Breakers		July 1998	
—	DF	Luke Casserly	Marconi Fairfield		July 1998	
—	MF	Troy Cranney	Brisbane Strikers		July 1998	
—	DF	Michael Cunico	(Australia) FFA Centre of Excellence		July 1998	
—	MF	Robert Enes	(England) Portsmouth		July 1998	
—	MF	Anthony Faria	(Australia) Blacktown City		July 1998	
—	DF	Adam Griffiths	(Australia) Sutherland Sharks		July 1998	
—	GK	Paul Henderson	(Australia) Sutherland Sharks		July 1998	
—	MF	(Croatia) Kresimir Marusic	Carlton		July 1998	
—	MF	Gabriel Mendez	(Australia) Parramatta Eagles		July 1998	
—	DF	(England) Phil Moss	(Australia) Eastern Suburbs		July 1998	
—	FW	Scott Ollerenshaw	(Malaysia) Negeri Sembilan		July 1998	
—	FW	Tony Perinich	Wollongong Wolves		July 1998	
—	GK	Josh Perosh	Sydney United		July 1998	
—	DF	Nick Purdue	(Belgium) Genk		July 1998	
—	DF	Marko Rudan	Sydney United		July 1998	
—	MF	Robbie Slater	(England) Wolverhampton Wanderers		July 1998	
—	MF	Jacek Sobczyk	(Australia) Blacktown City		July 1998	
—	FW	Clayton Zane	Newcastle Breakers		July 1998	
—	MF	James Stubbs-Millis	(Australia) Ryde City		September 1998	
—	FW	Paul Foster	(Hong Kong) Double Flower		September 1998	
—	MF	Matthew Bingley	(Japan) JEF United Chiba		November 1998	
—	MF	Adem Poric	Sydney Olympic		December 1998	

=== Transfers out ===
No.	Position	Player	Transferred to	Type/fee	Date	Ref
—	DF	Nick Purdue	Canberra Cosmos		December 1998	
—	DF	Eddy Bosnar	(Australia) Hurstville Zagreb		April 1999	
—	MF	James Stubbs-Mills	(Australia) Ryde City		April 1999	
—	DF	Paul Wearne	(Australia) Manly Warringah Dolphins		April 1999	

== Competitions ==
=== Overview ===
Competition	First match	Last match	Starting round	Final position	Record							
Competition	First match	Last match	Starting round	Final position	Pld	W	D	L	GF	GA	GD	Win %
National Soccer League	9 October 1998	25 April 1999	Matchday 1	5th	28	14	4	10	36	35	+1	50.00
National Soccer League Finals series	30 April 1999	9 May 1999	Elimination-finals	Elimination-finals	2	0	1	1	1	2	−1	0.00
Total					30	14	5	11	37	37	+0	46.67

Last updated: complete
Source: Competitions

=== National Soccer League ===
==== League table ====
Pos	Team	Pld	W	D	L	GF	GA	GD	Pts	Qualification
1	Sydney United	28	18	4	6	53	33	+20	58	Qualification for the Finals series
2	South Melbourne (C)	28	17	6	5	50	26	+24	57	Qualification for the Finals series and the Oceania Club Championship
3	Perth Glory	28	16	5	7	62	37	+25	53	Qualification for the Finals series
4	Marconi Fairfield	28	15	3	10	53	47	+6	48	Qualification for the Finals series
5	Northern Spirit	28	14	4	10	36	35	+1	46	Qualification for the Finals series
6	Adelaide City	28	13	6	9	39	26	+13	45	Qualification for the Finals series
7	Sydney Olympic	28	12	7	9	46	36	+10	43	
8	Newcastle Breakers	28	11	7	10	29	33	−4	40	
9	Brisbane Strikers	28	11	6	11	41	47	−6	39	
10	Wollongong Wolves	28	8	8	12	45	52	−7	32	
11	Carlton	28	9	4	15	47	47	0	31	
12	Melbourne Knights	28	8	5	15	32	43	−11	29	
13	West Adelaide	28	7	6	15	36	46	−10	27	
14	Gippsland Falcons	28	5	10	13	17	44	−27	25	
15	Canberra Cosmos	28	4	3	21	21	55	−34	15	

Source: rsssf.com
Rules for classification: 1) points; 2) goal difference; 3) number of goals scored.
(C) Champions

==== Results summary ====
Overall								Home						Away					
Pld	W	D	L	GF	GA	GD	Pts	W	D	L	GF	GA	GD	W	D	L	GF	GA	GD
28	14	4	10	36	35	+1	46	9	2	3	19	10	+9	5	2	7	17	25	−8

Source: worldfootball.net

==== Results by round ====
Round	1	2	3	4	5	6	7	8	9	10	11	12	13	14	15	16	17	18	19	20	21	22	23	24	25	26	27	28	29	30
Ground	H	A	A	H	H	A	B	H	A	A	A	H	A	H	H	A	H	H	A	H	A	A	H	B	H	H	A	H	A	A
Result	L	L	W	W	W	L	✖	D	L	W	L	W	W	D	W	W	W	L	L	W	W	L	W	✖	L	W	D	W	D	L
Position	14	15	12	8	5	7	9	9	9	9	10	9	8	8	8	6	4	4	5	5	4	5	4	5	6	4	5	4	4	5

Source: worldfootball.net
A = Away; H = Home; W = Win; D = Draw; L = Loss

==== Matches ====
9 October 1998 1	Northern Spirit	0–2	Sydney Olympic	Sydney
		Report	Kalantzis 52'; Cardozo 56'	Stadium: North Sydney Oval; Attendance: 18,985; Referee: Simon Micallef

18 October 1998 2	Perth Glory	2–0	Northern Spirit	Perth
	Strudwick 57'; Markovski 78'	Report		Stadium: Perth Oval; Attendance: 17,580; Referee: Eugene Brazzale

25 October 1998 3	Carlton	1–2	Northern Spirit	Melbourne
	Bresciano 10'	Report	Rudan 16', 90+'	Stadium: Optus Oval; Attendance: 4,209; Referee: Brett Hugo

30 October 1998 4	Northern Spirit	2–1	Melbourne Knights	Sydney
	Marusic 26'; Watkins 83'	Report	Karl 75'	Stadium: North Sydney Oval; Attendance: 13,654; Referee: Mark Shield

6 November 1998 5	Northern Spirit	1–0	Wollongong City	Sydney
	Slater 49'	Report		Stadium: North Sydney Oval; Attendance: 14,818; Referee: Brett Hugo

15 November 1998 6	Adelaide City	2–0	Northern Spirit	Adelaide
	Mennillo 47'; Ki Kim 73'	Report		Stadium: Hindmarsh Stadium; Attendance: 4,726; Referee: Louis Prospero

27 November 1998 8	Northern Spirit	1–1	Brisbane Strikers	Sydney
	Marusic 14'	Report	Hews 66'	Stadium: North Sydney Oval; Attendance: 15,862; Referee: Gerry Connolly

6 December 1998 9	Sydney United	1–0	Northern Spirit	Sydney
	Sterjovski 39'	Report		Stadium: Edensor Park; Attendance: 6,236; Referee: Simon Micallef

14 December 1998 10	Canberra Cosmos	0–1	Northern Spirit	Canberra
		Report	Bilokapic 56' (pen.)	Stadium: Bruce Stadium; Attendance: 1,704; Referee: Greg Leverton

20 December 1998 11	South Melbourne	2–0	Northern Spirit	Melbourne
	Curcija 31', 54' (pen.)	Report		Stadium: Bob Jane Stadium; Attendance: 6,206; Referee: Eddie Lennie

27 December 1998 12	Northern Spirit	1–0	Gippsland Falcons	Sydney
	Marusic 82'	Report		Stadium: North Sydney Oval; Attendance: 10,376; Referee: David Dwight

3 January 1999 13	Adelaide Sharks	2–3	Northern Spirit	Adelaide
	Poimer 32'; Gibson 89'	Report	Crook 60'; Zane 83'; Marusic 85'	Stadium: Hindmarsh Stadium; Attendance: 2,809; Referee: Sam Hasic

8 January 1999 14	Northern Spirit	0–0	Newcastle Breakers	Sydney
		Report		Stadium: North Sydney Oval; Attendance: 13,206; Referee: Jeff Tippett

15 January 1999 15	Northern Spirit	4–0	Marconi Fairfield	Sydney
	Bilokapic 23'; Slater 28'; Marusic 40'; Watkins 85'	Report		Stadium: North Sydney Oval; Attendance: 17,507; Referee: Eugene Brazzale

24 January 1999 16	Sydney Olympic	2–3	Northern Spirit	Sydney
	Cardozo 43', 87'	Report	Slater 9', 29'; Enes 54'	Stadium: Belmore Sports Ground; Attendance: 9,151; Referee: Simon Micallef

26 January 1999 17	Northern Spirit	1–0	Perth Glory	Sydney
	Cunico 73'	Report		Stadium: North Sydney Oval; Attendance: 17,722; Referee: Mark Shield

29 January 1999 18	Northern Spirit	1–2	Sydney United	Sydney
	Marusic 68'	Report	Burns 44', 83'	Stadium: North Sydney Oval; Attendance: 17,024; Referee: Gerry Connolly

6 February 1999 19	Brisbane Strikers	5–1	Northern Spirit	Brisbane
	Tollenaere 34'; Zoricich 60'; Laybutt 61'; Meredith 63'; Hughes 69'	Report	Arnold 85'	Stadium: Suncorp Stadium; Attendance: 5,436; Referee: Eddie Lennie

14 February 1999 20	Northern Spirit	3–1	Carlton	Sydney
	Arnold 45'; Slater 58'; Marusic 65'	Report	Lapsansky 19'	Stadium: North Sydney Oval; Attendance: 8,328; Referee: Simon Micallef

20 February 1999 21	Melbourne Knights	2–3	Northern Spirit	Melbourne
	Kelic 38'; Kutlesovski 77'	Report	Watkins 33'; Arnold 47'; Slater 77'	Stadium: Knights Stadium; Attendance: 3,728; Referee: Louis Prospero

28 February 1999 22	Wollongong City	3–2	Northern Spirit	Wollongong
	Surjan 9', 11', 51'	Report	Slater 22'; Bingley 66'	Stadium: Brandon Park; Attendance: 5,679; Referee: Brett Hugo

5 March 1999 23	Northern Spirit	1–0	Adelaide City	Sydney
	Zane 29'	Report		Stadium: North Sydney Oval; Attendance: 15,104; Referee: Eddie Lennie

19 March 1999 25	Northern Spirit	1–2	Canberra Cosmos	Sydney
	Zane 21'	Report	Magnacca 29'; de Jesus 72'	Stadium: North Sydney Oval; Attendance: 10,482; Referee: Eddie Lennie

26 March 1999 26	Northern Spirit	1–0	South Melbourne	Sydney
	Marusic 10'	Report		Stadium: North Sydney Oval; Attendance: 16,543; Referee: Mark Shield

4 April 1999 27	Gippsland Falcons	1–1	Northern Spirit	Morwell
	Hastie 61'	Report	Arnold 43'	Stadium: Mobil Park; Attendance: 1,500; Referee: Jane Blaney

9 April 1999 28	Northern Spirit	2–1	Adelaide Sharks	Sydney
	Crook 1'; Casserly 34'	Report	Artone 27'	Stadium: North Sydney Oval; Attendance: 15,246; Referee: Mark Shield

16 April 1999 29	Newcastle Breakers	1–1	Northern Spirit	Newcastle
	Haythornthwaite 67'	Report	Bilokapic 59' (pen.)	Stadium: Breakers Stadium; Attendance: 5,015; Referee: Matthew Breeze

25 April 1999 30	Marconi Fairfield	1–0	Northern Spirit	Sydney
	Awaritefe 30'	Report		Stadium: Marconi Stadium; Attendance: 10,117; Referee: Gerry Connolly

==== Finals series ====
30 April 1999 Elimination-finals 1st Leg	Northern Spirit	0–0	Marconi Fairfield	Sydney
		Report		Stadium: North Sydney Oval; Attendance: 17,246; Referee: Eugene Brazzale

9 May 1999 Elimination-finals 2nd Leg	Marconi Fairfield	2–1	Northern Spirit	Sydney
	Smith 45'; Babic 47'	Report	Arnold 81'	Stadium: Marconi Stadium; Attendance: 11,319; Referee: Mark Shield

== Statistics ==
=== Appearances and goals ===
Players with no appearances not included in the list.

No.	Pos.	Nat.	Name	National Soccer League		Total	
No.	Pos.	Nat.	Name	Apps	Goals	Apps	Goals
—	FW	(Australia)	Graham Arnold	26(2)	4	28	5
—	MF	(Australia)	Paul Bilokapic	26(1)	3	27	3
—	MF	(Australia)	Matthew Bingley	10	1	10	1
—	DF	(Australia)	Luke Casserly	25	1	25	1
—	MF	(Australia)	Troy Cranney	4	0	4	0
—	MF	(England)	Ian Crook	10(2)	2	12	2
—	DF	(Australia)	Michael Cunico	15(6)	1	21	1
—	MF	(Australia)	Robert Enes	19(1)	1	20	1
—	MF	(Australia)	Anthony Faria	1(2)	0	3	0
—	MF	(Australia)	Paul Foster	1(3)	0	4	0
—	GK	(Australia)	Paul Henderson	30	0	30	0
—	MF	(Australia)	Matthew Langdon	23	0	23	0
—	MF	(Croatia)	Kresimir Marusic	27	8	27	8
—	MF	(Australia)	Gabriel Mendez	6(7)	0	13	0
—	DF	(England)	Phil Moss	13(8)	0	21	0
—	MF	(Australia)	Adem Poric	2	0	2	0
—	DF	(Australia)	Marko Rudan	24	2	24	2
—	DF	(Australia)	Robbie Slater	27	7	27	7
—	MF	(Australia)	Adam Snyder	0(2)	0	2	0
—	MF	(Australia)	Jack Sobczyk	1	0	1	0
—	FW	(Australia)	Daniel Watkins	12(11)	3	23	3
—	FW	(Australia)	Clayton Zane	22(5)	3	27	3
Player(s) transferred out but featured this season
—	DF	(Australia)	Eddy Bosnar	4(9)	0	13	0
—	DF	(Australia)	Nick Purdue	1	0	1	0
—	MF	(Australia)	James Stubbs-Mills	0(4)	0	4	0
—	DF	(Australia)	Paul Wearne	1(3)	0	4	0

=== Clean sheets ===
Rank	No.	Pos	Nat	Name	National Soccer League	Total
1	—	GK	(Australia)	Paul Henderson	9	9
Total					9	9
