= Carlton SC league record by opponent =

Carlton Soccer Club was an Australian professional association football club based in Jolimont, Melbourne. The club was formed in 1997. They were admitted into the National Soccer League for the 1997–98 season. They dissolved in 2000 and effectively left the 2000–01 National Soccer League after eight matches.

Carlton's first team had competed in the National Soccer League. Their record against each club faced in the National Soccer League is listed below. Carlton's first National Soccer League match was against Perth Glory, and they met their 17th and last different league opponent, Newcastle United (now Newcastle Jets), for the first time in the 2000–01 National Soccer League season. The team that Carlton had played most in league competition is South Melbourne, who they first met in the 1997–98 National Soccer League season; the 9 defeats from 13 meetings was more than they had lost against any other club. Newcastle Breakers and West Adelaide had drawn 3 league encounters with Carlton, more than any other club. Carlton had recorded more league victories against Canberra Cosmos than against any other club, having beaten them 7 times out of 10 attempts.

== Key ==
- The table includes results of matches played by Carlton in the National Soccer League.
- The name used for each opponent is the name they had when Carlton most recently played a league match against them. Results against each opponent include results against that club under any former name.
- The columns headed "First" and "Last" contain the first and most recent seasons in which Carlton played league matches against each opponent.
- P = matches played; W = matches won; D = matches drawn; L = matches lost; Win% = percentage of total matches won
- ‡ Clubs with this background and symbol in the "Opponent" column were defunct during the club's period.

== All-time league record ==
Carlton SC league record by opponent
Club	P	W	D	L	P	W	D	L	P	W	D	L	Win%	First	Last	Notes
Club	Home				Away				Total				Win%	First	Last	Notes
Adelaide Force	4	2	0	2	4	0	2	2	8	2	2	4	25.00	1997–98	2000–01	(Note: Includes two matches forfeited by Carlton. The matches were awarded 3–0 victories to Adelaide Force.)
Brisbane Strikers	4	2	1	1	4	1	1	2	8	3	2	3	37.50	1997–98	2000–01	(Note: Includes two matches forfeited by Carlton. The matches were awarded 3–0 victories to Brisbane Strikers.)
Canberra Cosmos	5	4	0	1	5	3	0	2	10	7	0	3	70.00	1997–98	2000–01	(Note: Includes one match forfeited by Carlton. The match was awarded a 3–0 victory to Canberra Cosmos.)
Eastern Pride	5	4	0	1	5	3	0	2	8	3	2	3	37.50	1997–98	2000–01	(Note: Includes one match forfeited by Carlton. The match was awarded a 3–0 victory to Eastern Pride.)
Football Kingz	2	0	1	1	2	1	0	1	4	1	1	2	25.00	1999–2000	2000–01	(Note: Includes one match forfeited by Carlton. The match was awarded a 3–0 victory to Football Kingz.)
Marconi Fairfield	6	2	1	3	5	4	0	1	11	6	1	4	54.55	1997–98	2000–01	(Note: Includes two matches forfeited by Carlton. The matches were awarded 3–0 victories to Marconi-Fairfield.)
Melbourne Knights	4	2	1	1	4	1	0	3	8	3	1	4	37.50	1997–98	2000–01	(Note: Includes two matches forfeited by Carlton. The matches were awarded 3–0 victories to Melbourne Knights.)
Newcastle Breakers ‡	3	2	1	0	3	0	2	1	6	2	3	1	33.33	1997–98	1999–2000	
Newcastle United	1	0	0	1	1	0	0	1	2	0	0	2	0.00	2000–01	2000–01	(Note: Includes two matches forfeited by Carlton. The matches were awarded 3–0 victories to Newcastle United.)
Northern Spirit	3	1	0	2	3	0	0	3	6	1	0	5	16.67	1998–99	2000–01	(Note: Includes one match forfeited by Carlton. The match was awarded a 3–0 victory to Northern Spirit.)
Parramatta Power	2	0	0	2	2	0	0	2	4	0	0	4	0.00	1999–2000	2000–01	(Note: Includes two matches forfeited by Carlton. The matches were awarded 3–0 victories to Parramatta Power.)
Perth Glory	4	2	0	2	4	0	1	3	8	2	1	5	25.00	1997–98	2000–01	(Note: Includes two matches forfeited by Carlton. The matches were awarded 3–0 victories to Perth Glory.)
South Melbourne	6	1	0	5	7	2	1	4	13	3	1	9	23.08	1997–98	2000–01	(Note: Includes one match forfeited by Carlton. The match was awarded a 3–0 victory to South Melbourne.)
Sydney Olympic	5	1	1	3	4	1	0	3	9	2	1	6	22.22	1997–98	2000–01	(Note: Includes one match forfeited by Carlton. The match was awarded a 3–0 victory to Sydney Olympic.)
Sydney United	4	1	1	2	4	1	1	2	8	2	2	4	25.00	1997–98	2000–01	(Note: Includes one match forfeited by Carlton. The match was awarded a 3–0 victory to Sydney United.)
West Adelaide	2	0	2	0	2	1	1	0	4	1	3	0	25.00	1997–98	1998–99	
Wollongong City	4	3	0	1	5	1	0	4	9	4	0	5	44.44	1997–98	2000–01	(Note: Includes one match forfeited by Carlton. The match was awarded a 3–0 victory to Wollongong City.)
