= Anastasiadis =

Anastasiadis is a Greek surname. Notable people with the surname include:

- Anestis Anastasiadis (born 1983) Greek footballer
- Angelos Anastasiadis (born 1953) Greek football manager
- Dean Anastasiadis (born 1970) Australian football coach, brother of John
- John Anastasiadis (born 1968) Australian football manager, brother of Dean
- Nikos Anastasiadis (born 1946) 7th and current (2013-) President of Cyprus
- Themos Anastasiadis (1958–2019) Greek Journalist
