= Stergiopoulos =

Stergiopoulos is a surname. Notable people with the surname include:

- Marcus Stergiopoulos (born 1974), Australian soccer player
- Vicky Stergiopoulos (fl. 1997), public health scientist
