= Michael Petkovic =

Australian soccer player

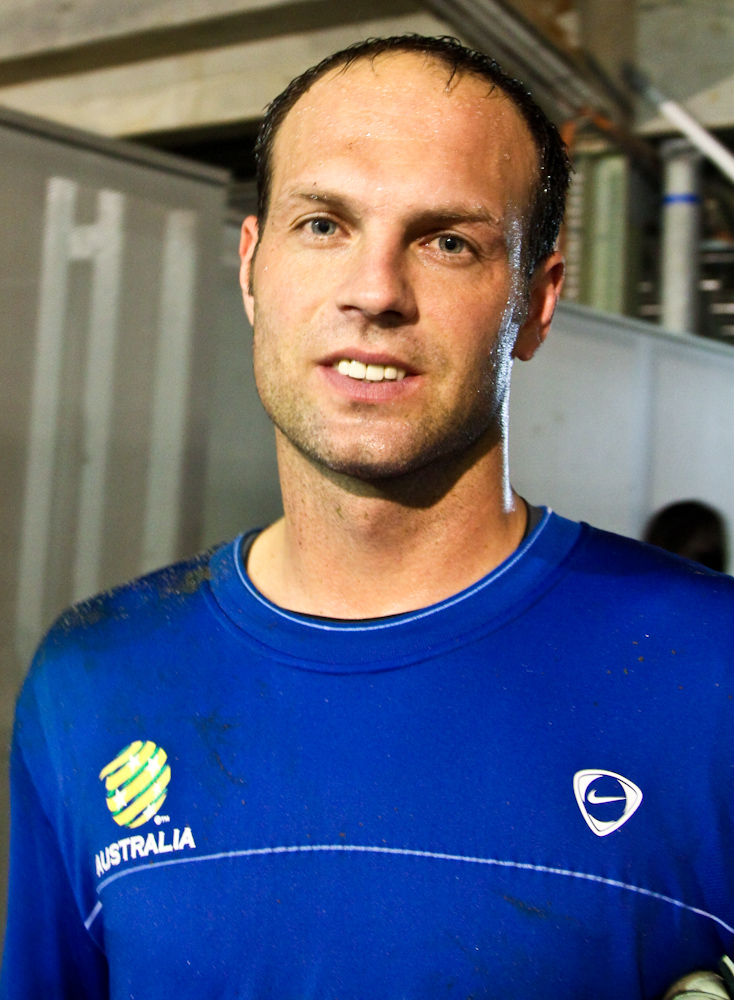

Personal information
- Full name: Michael Petkovic
- Date of birth: 16 July 1976 (age 50)
- Place of birth: Fremantle, Australia
- Height: 1.89 m (6 ft 2 1/2 in)
- Position: Goalkeeper

Senior career*
Years	Team	Apps	(Gls)
1995–1999	South Melbourne	172	(0)
1999–2000	RC Strasbourg	0	(0)
2000–2002	South Melbourne	56	(0)
2001	→ Lillestrøm (loan)	0	(0)
2002–2005	Trabzonspor	87	(0)
2005–2010	Sivasspor	129	(1)
2010–2011	Melbourne Victory	31	(0)
Total		408	(1)

International career
2001–2008	Australia	6	(0)
- * Club domestic league appearances and goals

Michael Petkovic (born 16 July 1976) is an Australian former goalkeeper.

== Club career ==
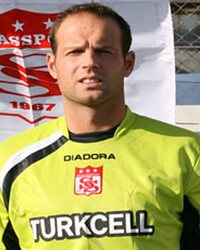
Petkovic at Sivasspor in 2006

Petkovic is of Croatian origin and is the brother of former Perth Glory goalkeeper Jason Petkovic.

=== South Melbourne ===
Petkovic started off his career with South Melbourne in the NSL as a 19-year-old. As the second choice to youth product Dean Anastasiadis, Petkovic was relegated to cup games for game time. Petkovic however took advantage of his limited opportunities and produced numerous man of the match performances in South Melbourne's successful NSL Cup run in the 1995/96 Season. Following this season, Petkovic would reclaim the number 1 spot and establish himself as one of Australia's finest goalkeepers as he earned half of his Socceroos caps during his time at South Melbourne.

Petkovic would form a key role under Ange Postecoglou's all-conquering South side as they went on to win back-to-back Championships in 1997/1998 and 1998/1999.

Petkovic was awarded the NSL goalkeeper of the year title in 1999, 2001 and 2002 and was awarded the Theo Marmaras medal in 1999 which is given to the best player in that season for South Melbourne. His performances for the club led him to be voted by an expert panel as the starting goalkeeper in South Melbourne's team of the century in 2002.

Overall during his 2-stints at the Hellas, Petkovic played 224 times keeping 54 clean sheets.

=== Later career ===
In 1999, he moved to French side RC Strasbourg but didn't play a single league game and in 2000 he moved back to his old team South Melbourne. During his 2nd stint with the club, he moved on loan to Lillestrøm SK, a Norwegian club. In 2002, he moved to Turkish Super Lig side Trabzonspor and played 87 games for the club but left the club in 2005. He moved to Sivasspor and played 129 league games there and even managed to score a goal with the club. In 2010, he left the club to join A League side Melbourne Victory. He played over 25 games in his first a league season and looked to stay there for the next campaign. He looked to be 2nd choice goalkeeper for the next campaign as Perth Glory goalkeeper Tando Velaphi joined the Melbourne Victory. He announced his retirement from football shortly after the end of Melbourne Victory's Asian Champions League campaign.

== International career ==
Petkovic's most notable appearance for his national side was when he kept goal in his team's world record breaking 31–0 win over American Samoa. He has had a total of six caps for Australia.

== Career statistics ==
=== International ===
Australia national team
Year	Apps	Goals
2001	3	0
2002	0	0
2003	0	0
2004	0	0
2005	1	0
2006	0	0
2007	1	0
2008	1	0
Total	6	0

== Honours ==
=== Individual ===
- South Melbourne FC Team of the Century
- NSL Goalkeeper of the year: 1999, 2001, 2002
- Theo Marmaras Medal: 1999

=== South Melbourne FC ===
- NSL Championship: 1998/1999, 1997/1998
- NSL Cup: 1996

Trabzonspor

- Turkish Cup: 2002–03, 2003–04
