= Başer =

Başer is a Turkish surname. Notable people with the surname include:

- Tansel Başer (born 1978), Australian footballer
- Tevfik Başer (born 1951), Turkish-German film director
- Yusuf Başer (born 1980), Turkish karateka
