= Fausto De Amicis =

Australian former soccer player

Personal information
- Date of birth: 26 June 1968 (age 58)
- Place of birth: Melbourne, Australia
- Position: Defender

Youth career
- Brunswick Juventus

Senior career*
Years	Team	Apps	(Gls)
1992–1996	Melbourne Knights	47	(2)
1996–2003	South Melbourne	174	(2)
2005	Heidelberg United	28	(0)

International career
1998–2002	Australia	13	(2)

Managerial career
- 2017–: Moreland Zebras
Medal record
Representing Australia
Men's Association football
OFC Nations Cup
Runner-up	1998 Australia
Runner-up	2002 New Zealand
AFC–OFC Challenge Cup
Runner-up	2001 Japan
- * Club domestic league appearances and goals

Fausto De Amicis (born 26 June 1968) is an Australian former soccer player. He was a member of the Australian national team that scored a record 31 goals against American Samoa in a FIFA World Cup qualifier. Overall, De Amicis was involved in four National Soccer League title winning sides, twice with the Melbourne Knights, and twice with South Melbourne. In the latter's 1998 Grand Final win over Carlton, De Amicis was awarded the Joe Marston Medal for best afield.

== Playing career ==
De Amicis made his debut for Australia against Chile in February 1998, at the age of 29.

== International goals ==
No.	Date	Venue	Opponent	Score	Result	Competition
1.	11 April 2001	Coffs Harbour International Stadium, Coffs Harbour, Australia	American Samoa	19–0	31–0	2002 FIFA World Cup qualification
2.	10 July 2002	Ericsson Stadium, Auckland, New Zealand	Fiji	8–0	8–0	2002 OFC Nations Cup

== Coaching career ==
After the departure of Moreland Zebras senior head coach Danny Gnjidic at the end of the 2016 NPL2 West season, the club appointed former player De Amicis as the new manager.

== Honours ==
Melbourne Knights

- National Soccer League Champion: 1995, 1996

South Melbourne

- National Soccer League Champion: 1998, 1999

Australia

- OFC Nations Cup: runner-up 1998, 2002
- AFC–OFC Challenge Cup: runner-up 2001
