= Vicky Stergiopoulos =

Canadian medical doctor and researcher

- Education: MD from Dalhousie University, Residency training at the University of Toronto, MHSc from the University of Toronto, and Director training from the Rotman School of Management
- Occupation: Clinician Scientist
- Scientific career
- Institutions: CAMH, University of Toronto, St. Michael's Hospital

Vicky Stergiopoulos is a senior clinician scientist at the Centre for Addiction and Mental Health (CAMH), and a full professor at the University of Toronto within the Department of Psychiatry and the Institute of Health Policy, Management and Evaluation. She is also an affiliate scientist with the MAP Centre for Urban Health Solutions in the Li Ka Shing Knowledge Institute of St. Michael's Hospital in Toronto, Canada.

Her research primarily focuses on improving housing and health outcomes and improving the livelihoods of adults with complex mental illnesses. This work includes the examination of interventions aimed at improving these outcomes in this population, quality of housing for adults with complex needs, and collaborative care models in mental health.

== Education ==
Stergiopoulos completed a Masters in Health Sciences (MHSc) in Health Administration from the University of Toronto's Institute of Policy, Management, and Evaluation. She then went on to complete director's education training at the Rotman School of Management. She completed medical school within the Faculty of Medicine of Dalhousie University in 1997, and then went on to complete her psychiatry residency at the University of Toronto in 2002. She obtained professional corporation authorization on June 23, 2011 to practice within the CAMH hospital.

== Career ==
She most notably co-led the At Home/Chez Soi study which was the largest randomized controlled trial consisting of more than 2,000 individuals struggling with homelessness and with mental illness across Canada from 2009-2013, which led to the Province of Ontario to set a goal towards ending homelessness.

Stergiopoulos had also served as the medical director of the Inner City Health Associates (ICHA) from 2007 to 2011 , which refers to a group of health care providers providing specialized services to vulnerable populations, specifically those experiencing homelessness, in Toronto, Canada. From 2011 to 2016, she became the Psychiatrist-in-Chief at St. Michael's Hospital.
