= Vlado Mirković =

Montenegrin footballer

Vladislav Mirković
Personal information
- Full name: Vladislav Mirković
- Date of birth: 26 March 1975 (age 51)
- Place of birth: Budva, SFR Yugoslavia
- Height: 1.80 m (5 ft 11 in)
- Position: Forward

Senior career*
Years	Team	Apps	(Gls)
1992–1996	Mogren	14	(1)
1996–1997	Jedinstvo Paraćin		
1997	Rudar Pljevlja	13	(2)
1998	Carlton SC	3	(1)
1998	Mogren	15	(1)
1999–2003	Red Star Belgrade	25	(6)
2004	Bežanija	9	(3)
- * Club domestic league appearances and goals

Vladislav Mirković (Cyrillic: Владислав Мирковић; born 26 March 1975) is a Montenegrin retired footballer.

== Club career ==
During his career, he played as forward and represented the following clubs: FK Mogren, FK Jedinstvo Paraćin, FK Rudar Pljevlja, Australian Carlton SC, Red Star Belgrade and FK Bežanija.

== Honours ==
Red Star

- First League of FR Yugoslavia: 1999-00, 2000-01
- FR Yugoslavia Cup: 1999, 2000
