= Michael Curcija =

Australian soccer player

Personal information
- Full name: Michael Dragan Curcija
- Date of birth: 27 June 1977 (age 49)
- Place of birth: Melbourne, Australia
- Height: 1.81 m (5 ft 11 in)
- Position: Striker

Youth career
- 1995: AIS

Senior career*
Years	Team	Apps	(Gls)
1994–1995	Heidelberg United	2	(0)
1995–2000	South Melbourne	114	(43)
2000–2001	Partizan	1	(0)
2001–2002	Braga	8	(1)
2001–2002	Braga B	20	(5)
2003–2004	South Melbourne	25	(13)
2004–2005	Essendon Royals	26	(15)
2005–2006	Kingston City	26	(17)
2006–2010	Altona Magic	78	(34)
2010	Oakleigh Cannons	19	(7)
2011	Shepparton United	6	(3)
2012	Cairnlea FC		
2013–2016	Essendon Royals	50	(14)

International career
1996–1997	Australia U20	13	(6)
1997–2000	Australia U23	25	(9)
2000	Australia	2	(0)
Medal record
Representing Australia
Men's Association football
OFC U-20 Championship
Winner	1997 Tahiti
- * Club domestic league appearances and goals

Michael Dragan Curcija (Serbian: Мајкл Драган Ћурчија, Majkl Dragan Ćurčija; born 27 June 1977) is an Australian retired football striker.

== Club career ==
Curcija's first taste of senior football came in the lower levels of the Victorian State League, where as a 16-year-old, he made his debut for Diamond Valley United, scoring in three matches before securing a move to Heidelberg United in the National Soccer League. Curcija made his NSL debut in a 1–0 home loss to Adelaide City in 1994. Another substitute appearance followed before he transferred to rivals South Melbourne the following season.

It was at South Melbourne that Curcija established himself as one of Australia's most prolific young strikers. He helped the club to successive championships in 1998 and 1999, and scored a personal best of 19 goals in the 1999–2000 season. His career highlight for South Melbourne was representing the club in the 2000 FIFA Club World Championship in Brazil.

At the age of 23, Curcija secured a dream move to Serbian giants FK Partizan, but he struggled to settle or win a first team spot, and after three months, moved to Portugal where he signed a contract with the ambitious SC Braga in the Primeira Liga. His first season was restricted to bench appearances as the club finished fourth, but he secured his first starts with the senior squad along with his debut goal the following year. However, throughout his time at the club, he was largely a feature of the club's reserves team who competed in the Portuguese Third Tier.

Curcija ultimately returned to South Melbourne for what was the final NSL season in 2003–04, picking up where he left off in domestic football, scoring 13 goals in 25 appearances. With the league disbanded, Curcija returned to the Victorian Premier League, playing with Essendon Royals in 2004, where he scored at better than a goal a game. His form in 2005 was just as impressive, playing every match of the season for 15 goals.

Despite his pedigree, he failed to land a contract in the inaugural A-League season, and signed for newly promoted Kingston City in 2006, where another prolific season followed. In 2007, he transferred to Altona Magic, playing in successive championships in 2008 and 2009, before moving to Oakleigh Cannons for the 2010 season.

== International career ==
Having established himself as a first team regular for South Melbourne in the National Soccer League, Curcija was selected by Les Scheinflug in the Oceania Qualifying tournament for the 1997 FIFA World Youth Championship. He scored a brace in his first match against Fiji, and featured against New Zealand in the group phase and final. The finals were staged in Malaysia, and featured several players who would go on to become senior Socceroos, including Brett Emerton, Lucas Neill, Vince Grella and Mark Bresciano. Curcija featured in all of Australia's matches in the tournament, but failed to trouble the score sheet.

Curcija's performances at Under 20 level were rewarded with selection in the Olyroos squad for the 2000 Summer Olympics which were staged in Sydney, Australia. Raul Blanco played him in a striking role alongside Mark Viduka in all of Australia's matches against Italy, Nigeria and Honduras, but he did not score as the Olyroos failed to progress beyond the group phase.

He earned his first Socceroos cap under Frank Farina later that year in an away friendly against Kuwait, coming on as a substitute for goalscorer John Aloisi in the 60th minute. He replaced Aloisi again three days later in a match against South Korea, which the Socceroos lost 4–2 after blowing a 2–0 lead. Despite playing in a top European league at the time, he failed to impress the national selectors, and these matches remain his only full international caps.

== Honours ==
Australia U20

- OFC U-19 Men's Championship: 1997
