= Tansel Başer =

Australian soccer player

Personal information
- Full name: Tansel Başer
- Date of birth: 17 April 1978 (age 48)
- Place of birth: Melbourne, Australia
- Positions: Centre back; defensive midfielder; striker

Senior career*
Years	Team	Apps	(Gls)
1994–1998	South Melbourne	62	(1)
1999–2000	Trabzonspor	19	(0)
2000–2001	Vanspor	4	(0)
2001	Sebatspor	1	(0)
2001–2003	Erzurumspor	24	(2)
2003–2005	MKE Kırıkkalespor		
2006–2007	South Melbourne	44	(1)
2008–2011	Hume City	40	(8)

International career
1997	Australia U20		
1998	Australia U23		
- * Club domestic league appearances and goals

Tansel Başer (born 17 April 1978) is a former Australian footballer.
