= Vince Grella =

Australian soccer player (born 1979)

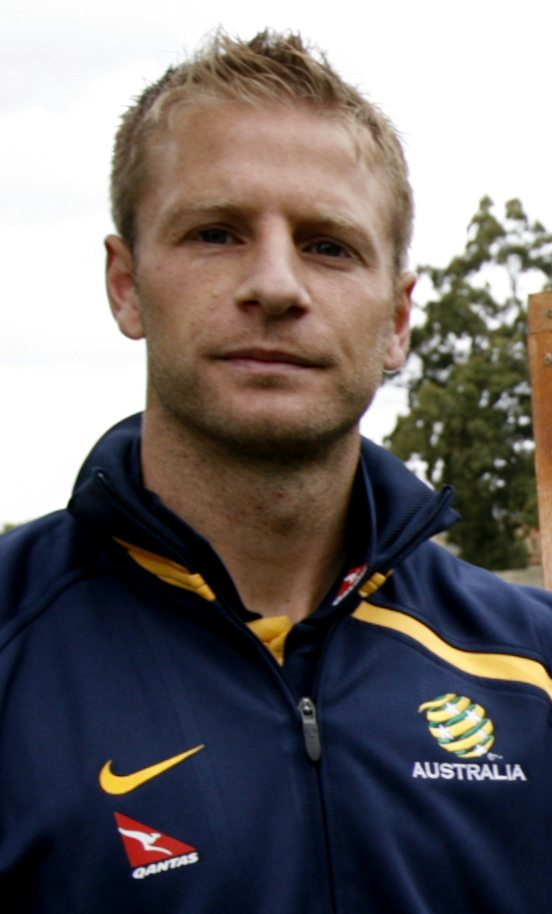
- Grella in 2009

Personal information
- Full name: Vincenzo Grella
- Date of birth: 5 October 1979 (age 47)
- Place of birth: Dandenong, Victoria, Australia
- Height: 1.82 m (6 ft 0 in)
- Position: Defensive midfielder

Team information
- Current team: Catania (vice-president & CEO)

Youth career
- Springvale City
- 1996–1997: AIS

Senior career*
Years	Team	Apps	(Gls)
1995–1996	Springvale City	16	(0)
1996–1997	Canberra Cosmos	14	(1)
1997–1998	Carlton	23	(1)
1998–2004	Empoli	60	(1)
1999–2001	→ Ternana (loan)	27	(0)
2004–2007	Parma	92	(2)
2007–2008	Torino	28	(1)
2008–2012	Blackburn Rovers	38	(0)
2012–2013	Melbourne Heart	1	(0)
Total		299	(6)

International career
1996–1999	Australia U20	11	(0)
1996–2000	Australia U23	17	(0)
2003–2010	Australia	46	(0)
Medal record
Representing Australia
Men's Association football
OFC Nations Cup
Winner	2004 Australia
OFC U-20 Championship
Winner	1998 Samoa
- * Club domestic league appearances and goals

Vincenzo Grella (born 5 October 1979) is an Australian former professional soccer player who played as a midfielder. He began his senior career in Australia before moving to Italy, where he spent over ten years, playing for Empoli, Ternana, Parma and Torino. He moved to Blackburn Rovers of the Premier League in 2008 where he spent four seasons, before returning to Australia in 2012 to play for Melbourne Heart.

He retired from professional football in January 2013, after a long-standing struggle with injuries. Grella represented the Australian national team on 46 occasions, and played at the 2006 and 2010 World Cups. His 2010 FIFA World Cup profile describes him as a possessing the "ability to mop up loose balls and halt opposition counter-attacks."

== Early life ==
Grella was born in Dandenong to Italian immigrants, Antonio and Maria.

== Club career ==
=== Italy ===
Grella had a ten-year stint in Italy's professional leagues after beginning his career in the NSL. He has been a regular for Australia since 2003, playing in his customary defensive midfield position, and was involved in both the 2006 World Cup and the 2007 Asian Cup. Grella's friendship with Australian teammate Mark Bresciano is well known. Grella has described Bresciano as "even more than a brother"; they played together at the AIS, Carlton and Empoli, and were reunited in 2004 when Grella joined Parma, before Bresciano moved on to Palermo in 2006. Aged 19, Grella made his debut in Serie A with Empoli, in a match against Juventus at the Stadio Delle Alpi, where his first job was to mark Zinedine Zidane. (Empoli held Juventus to a 0–0 draw.) Grella built up his reputation in Italy during his time with Empoli, to overcome initial doubts about his suitability to Serie A and earn the respect of the Italian media, coaches and fellow players. Grella was widely linked with a move to A.C. Milan in 2003, although the proposed transfer never eventuated, and he moved to Parma a year later. While at Parma, both Grella and Bresciano were excused from the 2005 Confederations Cup by the then-Australian manager Frank Farina to allow the pair to take part in a relegation playoff between Parma and Bologna–which Parma won, to avoid relegation.

Grella was named as captain of Parma for the 2006–07 season, and played a key role helping the team avoid relegation from Serie A for a second consecutive season. On 20 June 2007, Grella signed a three-year contract with Torino, one of several new signings made by The Bull. The move to Torino was a free transfer due to the expiry of his contract with Parma. During his one season in Turin, he was a regular member of the side, although his season was interrupted by injury on several occasions. He scored one league goal for Torino, a powerful volley from the edge of the penalty area, which cannoned in off the far post to draw level with Fiorentina. The goal was a candidate for goal of the month for January in Serie A. It was only the sixth league-goal of his career. From July 2022 he assumes the position of vice president and CEO of the Catania SSD owned by Ross Pelligra Australian of Sicilian origins

=== Blackburn Rovers ===
On 26 August 2008, Grella joined English then Premier League outfit Blackburn Rovers on a four-year deal, for an undisclosed fee, rumoured to be around £4 million (with the initial fee later revealed as €4.2 million), having previously been linked to fellow Premiership club Fulham. He joined fellow Australian Brett Emerton at the club. He made his first appearance for the club in a 4–1 loss to West Ham United at Upton Park, where he played the first 45 minutes, picking up a yellow card and providing an assist with a header for the only Blackburn goal, before being substituted at half-time for Keith Andrews. A calf injury kept him out of the side for a month following his debut, and he returned to the side in a 1–1 draw with Middlesbrough at Ewood Park, playing the full game in the centre of midfield. This was his home debut, and he was later named man-of-the-match for his performance.

The following 3 years he spent at the club were a frustrating time for Grella, and Blackburn Rovers fans, with injuries disrupting his stay at Rovers. A succession of knee, groin and calf problems would ultimately rule him out for vast majority of his contract. After the 2010–11 season, Blackburn Rovers revealed their desire to transfer Grella. However, with his history of injuries, no offers were made, and he left Blackburn Rovers upon the expiry of his contract at the end of the 2011/12 Barclays Premier League season, a season in which he only made 2 appearances. Over the last 2 years of his contract, Grella was only able to make a total of 9 appearances due to injuries.

=== Melbourne City ===
On 16 October 2012, Grella signed with Australian A-League club Melbourne City on a one-year deal. Previously, Grella stated he announced his intention to return to Italy next season, rather go back to his home country. But in the unexpected event, Grella says former national teammate and now manager of Melbourne City, John Aloisi convinced Grella to play football in Australia. Two months after the move, continuously having injuries, Aloisi revealed he's making a comeback from injury and just returned to training.

Vince Grella made his A-League debut for the Melbourne City on Australia Day, 26 January 2013 against the Western Sydney Wanderers at the Parramatta Stadium as a 68th minute replacement for Jonatan Germano. He officially announced his retirement two days later due to a torn calf that he picked up in his one match for Melbourne City. In an interview with the Australian FourFourTwo Magazine, Grella spoke out his retirement and said:

It was a crushing blow, but I'd done everything in my power to give me the best possible chance to be successful, When I realised that I couldn't be successful anymore, I made the decision not to play on. Ending in this way and not ending because of a lack of passion or a lack of enjoyment in playing football, but because of a physical problem that doesn't allow you to compete anymore - that's what leaves a bitter taste in my mouth. I work really hard, and not just this time, but all the previous times that I've made comebacks I've always been confident, tried and left no stone unturned. It's been frustrating because I'm a competitor and I've always tried to compete at the top level as often as possible. But to enjoy those really good times, you've got to be able to accept the really bad times. For me now, it's just about getting back to the family and having a couple of months off to refresh the mind.

== International career ==
Grella was a regular member of the Socceroos; he represented the Australian Under-23s at the 2000 Summer Olympics and received his first senior cap when he came on as a second-half substitute in the international friendly against England in 2003, which Australia won 3–1 at West Ham's Upton Park stadium. In November 2005, Grella played in both legs of the World Cup play-off against Uruguay, where Australia qualified for the 2006 World Cup for the first time in 32 years. At the World Cup, Grella's displays in the heart of Australia's midfield saw him named in a preliminary squad for FIFA's team of the tournament, the only Australian to make this list.

On 13 November 2006, Grella was selected as captain for an international friendly in London against Ghana, making him the 51st player to captain the Australia football team. On 21 July 2007 in Hanoi, Vietnam, Grella was sent off in the 76th minute of Australia's 2007 Asian Cup quarter-final against Japan. Leaping for a header, Grella's forearm connected with Naohiro Takahara's head, who had come from behind Grella, sending the latter to the ground. The game was 1–1 at the time and remained that way until the end of extra time, with Japan eliminating Australia from the tournament in a penalty shoot-out. He has currently amassed 46 caps for Australia since making his debut back in February 2003.

== Post-playing career ==
In July 2022, Grella moved back to Italy, after being named vice-president and CEO of Sicilian Serie C club Catania following the club's rebirth under an Australian ownership with Pelligra Group.

In February 2024, it was announced that Pelligra Group had purchased Australian club Perth Glory. Grella was a key figure in the sale and will play a role in running the club.

== Personal life ==
Grella and his wife, Barbara, have twin daughters, Victoria and Sophia, born in 2002. Grella first met Barbara while she was working in a shoe store in Empoli, Italy, which Grella frequently visited to buy shoes following their first meeting. He is fluent in Italian.

== Career statistics ==
=== Club ===
Appearances and goals by club, season and competition
Club	Season	League			Cup		Europe		Total	
Club	Season	Division	Apps	Goals	Apps	Goals	Apps	Goals	Apps	Goals
Canberra Cosmos	1996–97	NSL	14	1	0	0	0	0	14	1
Carlton	1997–98	NSL	23	1	0	0	0	0	23	1
Empoli	1998–99	Serie A	2	0	0	0	0	0	2	0
Ternana (loan)	1999–2000	Serie B	8	0	1	0	0	0	9	0
Ternana (loan)	2000–01	Serie B	19	0	2	0	0	0	21	0
Ternana (loan)	Total		27	0	3	0	0	0	30	0
Empoli	2001–02	Serie B	3	0	4	0	0	0	7	0
Empoli	2002–03	Serie A	32	1	3	0	0	0	35	1
Empoli	2003–04	Serie A	25	0	3	1	0	0	28	1
Empoli	Total		60	1	10	1	0	0	70	2
Parma	2004–05	Serie A	27	0	1	0	9	0	37	0
Parma	2005–06	Serie A	35	1	2	0	0	0	37	1
Parma	2006–07	Serie A	30	1	2	1	2	0	34	2
Parma	Total		92	2	5	1	11	0	108	3
Torino	2007–08	Serie A	28	1	4	0	0	0	32	1
Blackburn Rovers	2008–09	Premier League	17	0	2	0	0	0	19	0
Blackburn Rovers	2009–10	Premier League	15	0	2	0	0	0	17	0
Blackburn Rovers	2010–11	Premier League	5	0	2	0	0	0	7	0
Blackburn Rovers	2011–12	Premier League	1	0	1	0	0	0	2	0
Blackburn Rovers	Total		38	0	7	0	0	0	45	0
Melbourne Heart	2012–13	A-League	1	0	0	0	0	0	1	0
Career total			283	6	24	2	11	0	318	8

=== International ===
Appearances and goals by national team and year
National team	Year	Apps	Goals
Australia	2003	2	0
Australia	2004	8	0
Australia	2005	6	0
Australia	2006	9	0
Australia	2007	7	0
Australia	2008	4	0
Australia	2009	6	0
Australia	2010	4	0
Total		46	0

== Honours ==
Australia

- OFC Nations Cup: 2004

Australia U-20

- OFC U-19 Men's Championship: 1998
