= John Anastasiadis =

Australian soccer player (born 1968)

Personal information
- Full name: John Anastasiadis
- Date of birth: 13 August 1968 (age 58)
- Place of birth: Melbourne, Australia
- Position: Forward

Senior career*
Years	Team	Apps	(Gls)
1986–1988	Heidelberg United	42	(0)
1988–1997	PAOK	203	(24)
1997–2002	South Melbourne	108	(34)
2002–2003	Yarraville Glory		

International career
1987	Australia U20		

Managerial career
- 2003–2004: Yarraville Glory
- 2005–2008: South Melbourne
- 2009–2010: Oakleigh Cannons
- 2011–2019: Bentleigh Greens
- 2019–2023: Western United (assistant)
- 2024–: Heidelberg United
- * Club domestic league appearances and goals

Giannis "Johnny" Anastasiadis (Greek: Γιάννης "Τζόνι" Αναστασιάδης; born 13 August 1968 in Melbourne, Australia) is a former Australian soccer player who spent the majority of his career playing for Greek club PAOK. He is currently the manager at NPL Victoria side Heidelberg United.

== Club career ==
Anastasiadis began his career at Heidelberg United before being signed by the Greek club PAOK at the age of 19. PAOK was the Greek club he supported during his boyhood and his transfer made a dream come true. He made his debut in 1988 and became an influential part of the team, playing in 18 Alpha Ethniki matches, 5 cup games and 24 friendlies in the 1988/89 season, scoring 12 goals in total. He also took part in the club's brief 1990/91 and 1991/92 UEFA Cup campaigns. Anastasiadis played a total of 382 (203 league, 52 cup) matches and scored 66 (24 league, 3 cup) goals in his nine years at the club as a striker.

=== South Melbourne FC ===
Anastasiadis left PAOK in 1997 to return to Australia, where he joined NSL side South Melbourne FC. He played a key attacking role which helped the club to win back-to-back championships in the 1997/98 and 1998/99 seasons. under Ange Postecoglou, scoring goals in both grand final victories: once in the 1997/98 final, past his brother Dean Anastasiadis who was in goal for Carlton; and two goals in the 1998/99 Grand Final against Sydney United as a substitute.

He also represented the club at the 2000 FIFA Club World Championship, scoring the team's only goal (and Australia's first in the tournament) of the competition against Mexican side Necaxa. Thus becoming the first Australian to score in the famous Maracanã Stadium.

Anastasiadis played his last professional game in the 2000/01 NSL grand final against the Wollongong Wolves, coming off the bench to score in his third consecutive Grand Final, once again past his brother Dean who was in goal for the opposition.

At his time at Hellas, he scored 34 times in 108 appearances and is a member of the South Melbourne Hall of Fame.

=== Later career ===
He finished his playing career fully in 2003 playing in the lower Victorian leagues with Yarraville Glory, as captain-coach.

John Anastasiadis is an Honorary Life Member of Melbourne Club PAOK, The official PAOK Thessaloniki Supporters Club of Australia.

== Managerial career ==
After retirement from playing, and with Yarraville relegated under his stewardship in 2003, he managed to get the side promoted back the next season.

In 2005, with the return of South Melbourne to the Victorian Premier League after the disbandment of the NSL competition, Anastasiadis put his hand up for the job which few wanted. Despite taking charge of a young squad which had been destroyed by the FFA and was quickly assembled merely weeks before the start of the new season, and which was labelled as a relegation candidate at the start of the year, Anastasiadis led the side to 3rd place on the ladder at the end of the season and as far as the Preliminary Final, where the team lost 1–0 to Heidelberg United and was knocked out. It was an incredible achievement for Anastasiadis considering just three players turned up to his first training session at the club, one of which was his brother Dean. Retained as coach for the 2006 season, he led South Melbourne to victory in the Grand Final of the Vodafone Cup competition beating Altona Magic 1–0 in the Grand Final. After failing to make the finals in 2007, South's poor start in 2008 saw Anastasiadis resign.

After three years at South, John moved to the Oakleigh Cannons where he would spend the next three seasons. Despite mixed results, players such as Ivan Franjic. Cameron Watson and Nick Kalmar all came to prominence and earned A-League contracts. Anastasiadis departed Oakleigh in 2010.

Halfway through the 2011 season, Anastasiadis accepted a call from Bentleigh Greens to become the senior head coach. Since the move to Bentleigh, John has seen his team reach the VPL grand final in 2013, the semi-final of the inaugural FFA Cup in 2014 and win the club's first ever major title when Bentleigh beat South Melbourne FC at Lakeside Stadium in the National Premier Leagues Victoria Grand Final. Anastasiadis continued the success with Bentleigh winning the FFV Community Shield, beating foes South Melbourne FC at Kingston Heath Soccer Complex 3–0, the 2016 Dockerty Cup, the second major trophy in its history and first Dockerty Cup title, with a 1–0 victory over Green Gully SC, and just four days later, picked up the third piece of silverware for 2016, winning the NPL Victoria minor premiership for the first time in the club's history.

Anastasiadis completed his AFC/FFA B Accredited Coaching Course in 2011, and is due to complete his AFC/FFA A Accredited Coaching Course in 2015.

On 11 January 2019, Anastasiadis was announced as newly-formed A-League side Western United's inaugural senior assistant coach.

On 24 October 2023, Anastasiadis was call from Heidelberg United appointment as Head Coach of the NPL Senior Men's Team.

== Honours ==
=== Player ===
South Melbourne

National Soccer League Championship: 1997/1998, 1998/1999

National Soccer League Premiership: 2000/2001

OFC Champions League: 1999

Club Golden Boot: 1997/1998

=== Manager ===
VPL/ NPL Championship: 2006, 2015, 2017, 2019, 2025

NPL Premiers: 2016

Dockerty Cup: 2016, 2018

FFV Charity Shield: 2016, 2018, 2019
