= Lubo Lapsansky =

Slovak footballer (born 1972)

Personal information
- Date of birth: 9 May 1972 (age 54)
- Place of birth: Slovakia
- Position: Midfielder

Senior career*
Years	Team	Apps	(Gls)
1992–1993	VSS Košice		
1994–1997	Melbourne Knights	70	(6)
1997–2000	Carlton	88	(8)
2000–2001	Melbourne Knights	18	(3)
2001–2002	Parramatta Power	16	(0)
2002–2003	Melbourne Knights	19	(1)
- * Club domestic league appearances and goals

Lubomir Lapsansky (born 9 May 1972) is a Slovak former professional footballer who played as a midfielder.

== Early life ==
Lapsansky get up in the old Czechoslovakia, where he began playing football, before moving to Australia in 1993 at the age of twenty-one. In Slovakia, he joined the youth academy of Slovak side FK Poprad as a youth player before starting his senior club career with Slovak side VSS Košice.

== Club career ==
In 1994, Lapsansky signed for Australian side Melbourne Knights. He played alongside Australian internationals Mark Viduka and Danny Tiatto and helped the club win the league with a technical football style while making over seventy appearances. In 1997, he signed for Australian side Carlton, before returning to Melbourne Knights. In 2001, he signed for Australian side Parramatta Power, before returning to Melbourne Knights for a third and final time.

== International career ==
Lapsansky was considered to be called up to the Australia men's national soccer team for the 2002 OFC Nations Cup by then coach Frank Farina but he never received a call up.

== Style of play ==
Lapsansky mainly operated as a midfielder and was known for his vision and passing ability.

== Personal life ==
Lapsansky has been married and has a son. He is related to Slovak footballer Ivan Lapšanský.
