= Robert Trajkovski =

Australian soccer player

Personal information
- Full name: Robert Trajkovski
- Date of birth: 24 July 1972 (age 54)
- Position: Defender

Senior career*
Years	Team	Apps	(Gls)
1992–1994	Altona		
1994–1995	Melbourne City	21	(1)
1995–1996	Sydney United	43	(1)
1997–1998	Carlton	22	(0)
1998–2001	Perth Glory	73	(4)
2001–2004	Northern Spirit		

International career
1996–1998	Australia	3	(0)
Medal record
Representing Australia
Men's Association football
OFC Nations Cup
Runner-up	1998 Australia
- * Club domestic league appearances and goals

Robert Trajkovski (born 24 July 1972) is an Australian former footballer.

== Playing career ==
=== Club career ===
Trajkovski began his senior career with Altona before moving to National Soccer League team Melbourne City. After a season with Melbourne City Trajkovski transferred to Sydney United. He played two season for United between 1995 and 1997. In the 1997/98 season Trajkovski played for Carlton, playing 22 matches. Trajkovski moved to Perth Glory for the 1998/99 season. After playing 73 matches over three seasons for the Glory he moved to Northern Spirit where he saw out his top flight career.

=== International career ===
Trajkovski played three matches for the Australian national team between 1996 and 1998.

== Honours ==
Australia

- OFC Nations Cup: runner-up 1998
