= Mark Atkinson (footballer) =

New Zealand footballer

Personal information
- Full name: Mark Anthony Atkinson
- Date of birth: 16 February 1970 (age 56)
- Height: 1.77 m (5 ft 10 in)
- Position: Midfielder

Senior career*
Years	Team	Apps	(Gls)
1996	Sembawang Rangers	?	(?)
1997	Central United	?	(0)
1997–2000	Carlton S.C.	82	(2)
2000–2001	Eastern Pride	10	(0)
2001–2003	Football Kingz	28	(0)

International career
1997–2001	New Zealand	36	(0)
Medal record
Representing New Zealand
Men's Association football
OFC Nations Cup
Winner	1998 Australia
Runner-up	2000 Tahiti
- * Club domestic league appearances and goals

Mark Atkinson (born 16 February 1970) is a former association football player who frequently represented New Zealand.

His senior career began with Central United before he moved to Australia to join Carlton S.C. A short stint with Eastern Pride followed before Atkinson was recruited for the Football Kingz' inaugural season the A-League.

Atkinson made his full All Whites debut in a 1–0 win over Fiji on 7 June 1997. He was included in the New Zealand side for the 1999 Confederations Cup finals tournament and he ended his international playing career with 36 A-international caps to his credit, his final cap a substitute appearance in a 5–0 win over Tahiti on 6 June 2001.

== Honours ==
New Zealand

- OFC Nations Cup: 1998; Runner-up, 2000
