= Sean Douglas (footballer) =

New Zealand footballer

Personal information
- Full name: Sean Douglas
- Date of birth: 8 May 1972 (age 54)
- Place of birth: Auckland, New Zealand
- Height: 1.85 m (6 ft 1 in)
- Position: Defender

Team information
- Current team: Eastern Suburbs AFC

Senior career*
Years	Team	Apps	(Gls)
1994	Tyrwhitt Soccerites	?	(?)
1994–1995	Lyngby BK	0	(0)
1995–1996	Gippsland Falcons	25	(1)
1997–2001	Carlton SC	84	(0)
2000–2002	Football Kingz	35	(0)
2004–2006	Waitakere United	?	(?)
2006–2007	Auckland City	3	(0)
2007–2008	Team Wellington	20	(1)

International career^{‡}
1998–2001	New Zealand	26	(0)
Medal record
Representing New Zealand
Men's Association football
OFC Nations Cup
Winner	1998 Australia
Runner-up	2000 Tahiti
- * Club domestic league appearances and goals as of 16 April 2008 ‡ National team caps and goals as of 12:16, 26 August 2008 (UTC)

Sean Douglas (born 8 May 1972) is a retired association football player form New Zealand, who is currently the E-Learning Development Manager for Oceania Football Confederation, and works with FIFA as a Technical Expert in Coach Education. After his playing career, Sean worked as a Coach and Coach Educator. He held Technical Director roles at Auckland Football Federation, and Football Federation Victoria. He then moved to Football Federation Australia, where he spent 7 years, the majority as National Coach Education Manager.

== Club career ==
As a player, he played in Singapore and Denmark, but spent most of his years in the Australian league, returning to Auckland when Carlton SC collapsed in 2001. He was immediately handed the captain's armband at the Football Kingz. Briefly played for Auckland City for the remainder of the 2006-2007 New Zealand Football Championship. He finished his National League career playing for Team Wellington in the 2007–2008 season, but continued to play for Eastern Suburbs AFC until his move to Australia to take up his role with Football Federation Victoria.

== International career ==
Douglas also played for the All Whites, representing his country over 20 times in A-internationals including all three games at the 1999 Confederations Cup against USA, Germany & Brazil. He played his final international match in a June 2001 World Cup qualifying match against Vanuatu.

== Honours ==
New Zealand

- OFC Nations Cup: 1998; Runner-up, 2000
