= Kresimir Marusic =

Australian soccer player

Personal information
- Full name: Kresimir Marusic
- Date of birth: 23 November 1969 (age 56)
- Position: Midfielder

Youth career
- Dinamo Zagreb

Senior career*
Years	Team	Apps	(Gls)
1992–1993	Radnik Velika Gorica	25	(1)
1993–1994	Segesta Sisak	30	(5)
1994–1995	Melbourne Knights	8	(0)
1995–1996	Inker Zaprešić	4	(0)
1996–1997	Sydney United	28	(4)
1997–1998	Carlton S.C.	22	(1)
1998–1999	Northern Spirit FC	27	(8)
1999	SK Lommel	14	
2000–2001	Sydney Olympic	29	(6)
2001	Rockdale City Suns		
2001–2002	Sydney United	13	(0)
2002	Melbourne Knights	11	(2)
2003	Hurstville City Minotaurs		
- * Club domestic league appearances and goals

Kresimir Marusic (Croatian: Krešimir Marušić; born 23 November 1969) is a former Croatian footballer who, after beginning his career in his native country, played the majority of his career in Australia.

== Playing career ==
Marusic played youth football with Dinamo Zagreb between the ages of 10 and 17. He played in the First League with NK Radnik Velika Gorica and NK Segesta Sisak.

In 1995, he joined Australian team Melbourne Knights during the second half of the 1994–95 National Soccer League season, playing eighttimes.

In 1995, Marusic returned to Croatia, playing for NK Inker Zaprešić in the First League.

Returning to Australia, Marusic joined Sydney United, where he 22 times during the 1996–97 National Soccer League season and won the Johnny Warren Medal as the league's player of the year.

In 1997, he joined Carlton SC.

Marusic played for Belgian club SK Lommel in the 1999–2000 season.

He later played for NSL clubs Northern Spirit FC and Sydney Olympic.

Marusic was signed by Sydney United ahead of the 2001–02 National Soccer League season. He was released in January 2002 having played 13 times.

In January 2002, Marusic returned to Melbourne Knights, playing 11 matches to finish his NSL career.
