= Marcus Stergiopoulos =

Australian soccer player

Personal information
- Full name: Marcus Stergiopoulos
- Date of birth: 12 June 1973 (age 53)
- Place of birth: Sale, Victoria, Australia

Youth career
- 1978–1988: Sale United FC
- 1989–1992: Bradford City
- 1992: Morwell Falcons

Senior career*
Years	Team	Apps	(Gls)
1991	Traralgon Olympians	?	(?)
1992–1995	Morwell Falcons	31	(0)
1995	Brunei	?	(?)
1995–1996	Morwell Falcons	22	(1)
1996	Fawkner Blues	10	(0)
1996–1997	Gippsland Falcons	24	(1)
1997–1999	Carlton Blues	53	(2)
1999–2000	Football Kingz	28	(1)
2000	Lincoln City F.C.	7	(0)
2000–2001	Eastern Pride	12	(0)
2001–2002	Sydney United	9	(0)
2001–2002	Northern Spirit FC	7	(0)
2002–2003	A.P.I.A. Leichhardt Tigers	25	(3)
2003–2004	South Melbourne FC	19	(0)
2004–2005	Altona Magic	41	(5)
2006	Kingston City FC	26	(3)
2007	Oakleigh Cannons	28	(0)
2008–2010	Dandenong Thunder	44	(8)
2011	Fawkner Blues	20	(0)

Managerial career
- 2013: Croydon City Arrows
- 2017–2019: Beaumaris SC
- 2019–2020: Rochedale Rovers
- * Club domestic league appearances and goals as of 14 January 2017

Marcus Stergiopoulos (born 12 June 1974) is an Australian former soccer player who played as a midfielder.

Stergiopoulos made 89 appearances for Morwell Falcons in four separate stints at the club in Latrobe Valley, under the Falcons' three names (Morwell, Gippsland, and Eastern Pride). He is considered one of the best players to ever emerge from Gippsland, one of the strongest football regions in Australia.

Blessed with exceptional pace, excellent dribbling and crossing ability, Stergiopoulos was considered one of the best players in the National Soccer League and described by Johnny Warren as "an outstanding attacker down the flanks."

He made headlines when he scored a superb equalising goal from 30 yards out in the 1998 National Soccer League Grand Final.

Stergiopoulos signed for English club Lincoln City in August 2000. He scored once for the club, in a League Cup tie against Sheffield United, before leaving in November 2000.
