= Andrew Vlahos =

Australian-Greek soccer player

Personal information
- Full name: Andrew Vlahos
- Date of birth: 20 April 1976 (age 50)
- Place of birth: Melbourne, Australia
- Height: 1.71 m (5 ft 7 1/2 in)
- Positions: Forward; winger

Senior career*
Years	Team	Apps	(Gls)
1994–1996	Heidelberg United	17	(3)
1996–1997	Collingwood Warriors	24	(6)
1997–1998	Carlton	44	(15)
1998–1999	Panathinaikos	2	(0)
1999–2000	A.O. Agios Nikolaos F.C.	8	(0)
2000–2001	South Melbourne	39	(15)
2001–2003	Football Kingz	45	(9)
2003–2005	Cercle Brugge	59	(8)
2005–2006	Melbourne Victory	18	(0)
2006–2007	Heidelberg United	42	(11)
2008–2011	Hume City	37	(9)
2012	Heidelberg United	3	(0)
2012–2013	South Melbourne	22	(3)
2016	Fitzroy City		

Managerial career
- 2016–: Fitzroy City
Medal record
Representing Australia
Men's Association football
OFC U-20 Championship
Winner	1994 Fiji
- * Club domestic league appearances and goals as of 11 October 2013

Andrew Vlahos (born 20 April 1976) is a former Australian-Greek footballer.

== Biography ==
Andrew Vlahos began his senior career at Heidelberg United FC in the National Soccer League from 1994 to 1996. When Heidelberg and Collingwood Football Club formed to make Collingwood Warriors S.C., Vlahos signed for the new club and spent the season there, scoring 6 times in 24 games. The club consequently disbanded and Vlahos moved on to Carlton S.C. A move overseas followed to Greek giant Panathinaikos F.C. followed, but due to a lack of playing time, Vlahos moved to AO Agios Nikolaos for the 1999–2000 season. After that, Vlahos returned home to South Melbourne FC before moving to Football Kingz FC.

Whilst enjoying previous success in the Belgian Jupiler League with Cercle Brugge, Vlahos decided to return home, to play for Melbourne Victory in the inaugural season of the A-League. Then after returning to Heidelberg United in the Victorian Premier League.

In July 2012 he re-joined South Melbourne FC

In January 2015, Vlahos joined Mill Park SC as the club ambassador.

Andy Vlahos joined Fitzroy City Soccer Club in 2016 taking on the job of Head Senior Coach in the Victorian State 2 North West League.

== Honours ==
Australia U-20

- OFC U-20 Championship: 1994
