= Dean Anastasiadis =

Australian soccer player

Personal information
- Full name: Dean Anastasiadis
- Date of birth: 6 June 1970 (age 56)
- Place of birth: Melbourne, Australia
- Position: Goalkeeper

Youth career
- Meadow Park
- Yarraville Glory

Senior career*
Years	Team	Apps	(Gls)
1989	Heidelberg United	0	(0)
1990	Yarraville Glory	26	(0)
1991–1992	Fawkner Blues	44	(0)
1992–1995	South Melbourne FC	60	(0)
1995	Port Melbourne Sharks	11	(0)
1995–1996	South Melbourne FC	15	(0)
1996–1997	Collingwood Warriors	3	(0)
1997–2000	Carlton SC	92	(0)
2000–2002	Wollongong Wolves	38	(0)
2002–2004	South Melbourne FC	65	(0)
2004–2005	Essendon Royals		
2005–2008	South Melbourne FC	74	(0)
2009	Oakleigh Cannons	2	(0)
2012	South Springvale	3	(0)

International career^{‡}
2002	Australia	1	(0)

Managerial career
- 2012–2018: Melbourne Victory (assistant)
Medal record
Representing Australia
Men's Association football
OFC Nations Cup
Runner-up	2002 New Zealand
- * Club domestic league appearances and goals as of 28 December 2012 ‡ National team caps and goals as of 3 August 2007

Dean Anastasiadis (born 6 June 1970) is a former Australian soccer player.

== Biography ==
A goalkeeper, he played for many years at a variety of clubs in the National Soccer League. This included being part of the 2000–01 championship side at Wollongong Wolves, and the 1997–98 Grand Final runner up Carlton SC side, of whom he is also the games record holder. On both occasions, he played and was scored against by his brother John Anastasiadis. He retired at the end of 2008. Since then Anastasiadis has been coaching in the Victorian Premier League, and various State levels specializing in goalkeeper training. He also completed his Level B AFC/FFA outfield coaching diploma and Level 1 AFC/FFA goalkeeper licence. He is currently the goalkeeper coach with Melbourne Victory FC.

== Honours ==
=== Player ===
South Melbourne FC

VPL: Championship: 2006

Dockerty Cup: 1993, 1995

NSL Cup: 1995/96

Hellenic Cup: 2007

Wollongong Wolves

- National Soccer League Championship: 2000–01

Australia

- OFC Nations Cup: runner-up 2002

=== Personal honours ===
- Victorian Premier League Goalkeeper of the Year: 2005, 2006
