= South Melbourne FC =

Soccer club based in Melbourne, Victoria

South Melbourne
- Full name: South Melbourne Football Club
- Nickname: Hellas
- Founded: 1959 (67 years ago)
- Ground: Lakeside Stadium; Albert Park, Victoria
- Chairman: Bill Papastergiadis; Andrew Mesourouni
- Coach: Jamie Reed
- League: NPL Victoria (men's)
- 2026: 4th of 14 NPL; Australian Championship Champions (2025)
- Website: smfc.com.au
Home colours	Away colours

South Melbourne Football Club, nicknamed Hellas (Greek: Ελλάς, romanized: Ellás, pronounced [eˈlas]), is an Australian professional soccer club based in the suburb of Albert Park in Melbourne, Victoria. Its senior men's and women's teams play in the National Premier Leagues Victoria (NPL) and Victoria Women, in the second tier of the Australian league system. The club also competes in the Australian Championship as a foundation club, and the OFC Professional League. Its home ground is Lakeside Stadium.

Founded as South Melbourne Hellas (Greek: Νότια Μελβούρνη Ελλάς) by the merger of three clubs in 1959, it inherited the Greek Australian culture of its predecessors. Playing at Middle Park Stadium, Hellas enjoyed immediate success, earning promotion to Football Victoria's first division and winning seven titles in the 1960s and 70s. It was a charter member of the National Soccer League (NSL) and competed in all 28 seasons from 1977 to 2004, winning four championships and two NSL Cups. In the NSL's final seasons, the club moved to a reconfigured Lakeside Stadium, and competed as the South Melbourne Lakers and later South Melbourne SC. Upon its return to Victoria's first division in 2005, it adopted its current name.

South Melbourne have won ten Victorian men's titles, five women's titles, ten Dockerty Cups, and one State Cup. The club also won the 1999 OFC Club Championship, which earned them a place in the 2000 FIFA Club World Championship. The team won the Australia Cup in 2026. The IFFHS recognised South Melbourne as their Oceania Club of the Century in 2010. Its rivalries include Heidelberg United, the Melbourne Knights, Preston Lions, and Sydney Olympic. The club has also been a perennial candidate for expansion of the A-Leagues.

== History ==
=== Formation ===
South Melbourne was formed in 1959 with the amalgamation of three struggling Melbourne soccer clubs—South Melbourne United, the oldest of the three clubs with a history dating back to the early 1900s—the Greek-backed Yarra Park Aias (Ajax), and Hellenic. Theo Marmaras, initiator of the merger proposal and president of Hellenic, became the first president of the new club. In recognition of the large Greek Australian support base of Hellenic and Yarra Park, which were also the best-supported of the three clubs, the new club was named South Melbourne Hellas, the name by which it was to be known for the majority of its 50 years. The first emblem reflected the colour scheme of the Greek national flag. The first uniform consisted of jersey of white with a red 'V' around the collar, this was also that of South Melbourne United, as well as blue shorts and blue and white hooped socks. Later on they would adopt predominantly blue and white strips, with various designs throughout the seasons, with the most common being a predominantly royal blue strip.

=== 1960–1969 ===
South Melbourne won the Victorian First Division (North) championship of 1960, the club's inaugural year of competition. The club was promoted to the Victorian State League First Division the following year, where it finished fifth in its first year. With a number of astute signings—Scottish journeyman Tommy Anderson (George Cross), Ernie Ackerley (Manchester United), Leo Damianakos (Kalamata), Jim Pyrgolios (Panathinaikos) and Andreas Roussis, formerly of Panathinaikos and Apollon Athens—the club won the division championship in 1962, 1964, and 1965. In 1965, South Melbourne secured the services of 35-year-old former AEK Athens star, Kostas Nestoridis as player-coach. The result was a significant increase in crowd attendances and a fourth league title in 1966. Eager to repeat its success, the club recruited a number of Greek and local players, but they failed to make any impact. By 1969, the import experiment was considered a failure and most of the Greek players returned to their homeland.

=== 1970–77 ===
In 1970, the club focused its attention on recruiting local soccer players. It soon signed two players that would become South Melbourne Men's greatest players, Steve Walker and striker Jim Armstrong. South Melbourne missed out on the title by a point in the 1971 season, edged out by Footscray JUST, but with Armstrong scoring goals aplenty, South Melbourne went on to win the championship in 1972. The season also saw coach Bill Curran consolidate the first team's strength by signing midfielder Peter Bourne (Burnley) and promoting highly skilled youngsters Giovanni Barticciotto, Fethon Ileris and Bill Hasapis. The club continued its successful run with the 1974 title, second place in 1975, and with star recruits Jimmy Mackay, Peter Ollerton and Duncan Cummings, capped off its final year in the Victorian State League by winning the 1976 championship.

=== National Soccer League ===
Chart of yearly table positions for South Melbourne in NSL

South Melbourne joined Mooroolbark, Heidelberg United and Footscray JUST, as Melbourne's participants in the newly formed National Soccer League (NSL) in 1977, which was Australia's first sporting national competition. A mass exodus of its best players (Armstrong, Bourne, Mackay, Walker), saw the team slump to eleventh place in its inaugural year, but a recruiting drive by coach Dave Maclaren gave the club a respectable third in 1978. It was not to last as South Melbourne finished at the bottom of the league table in 1979.

=== 1978–89 ===
The first club emblem.

The recruitment of Alan Davidson, George Campbell (Aberdeen), Steve Blair, Branko Buljevic, Alun Evans (Liverpool), and Charlie Egan, helped South Melbourne climb the NSL ladder in the early part of the decade, with South becoming runners up in the NSL in 1981, which was their best ever NSL placing at the time. They also won the Ampol Cup in 1982. Some solid player signings such as (Oscar Crino, Doug Brown, Bobby Russell and John Yzendoorn) gave the club some respectability, but a combination of committee problems and a string of coaches, never allowed the team to settle and gain consistency. South Melbourne finished first on the league ladder in 1984, but in a newly restructured NSL competition, it also had to win the finals series to win the title. The club powered past local rivals Heidelberg United in the Southern Division play-offs, and edged out Sydney Olympic in the Grand Final to win the 1984 national championship.

After the departure of George Campbell to rivals Preston Makedonia in 1983–84, Branko Buljevic to Footscray Just in 1985 and others, South Melbourne could not repeat the success of the previous year. Despite finishing in first place, it was knocked out of the finals series by local rivals Brunswick Juventus and Preston. A major overhaul by coach Brian Garvey saw a number of new signings being made, including youngsters Paul Trimboli, David Healy, Kimon Taliadoros and Harry Micheil. The young team put in some memorable performances as the decade came to a close, finishing in the top half of the league table, but failed to win another championship. The club appointed Footballing icon Ferenc Puskás as coach for the 1989–90 season, helping South win the NSL Cup tournament for that season, as well backing up their 1988 Dockerty Cup win with victory in the 1989 tournament.

On 28 November 1981, South Melbourne Hellas and Melbourne Hakoah announced that they had merged to form a second team for South Melbourne which would compete in the Victorian State League and act as a feeder club to the South Melbourne senior team.

The price paid for 54 years of Hakoah history was $35,000. The merger had been an ongoing discussion between the two co-tenants of Middle Park from the middle of the 1981 season.

The two clubs had shared Middle Park from 1961 until 1981. Melbourne Hakoah cited financial strains and lack of crowd support as the two prime reasons why the club was forced to accept the offer from South Melbourne.

=== 1990–95 ===
The club's change of fortune continued next season, with the club winning its second national championship, beating rivals Melbourne Croatia on penalties after a tense 1–1 score line in normal time with many describing it as one of Australian soccer's best matches. With Croatia dominating most of the proceedings, striker Joe Palatsides was put through on goal by Paul Trimboli who equalised with the last kick of the game.

The team boasted some of the finest Australian soccer talent in Paul Fernandes, Michael Petersen, Paul Wade, Mehmet Durakovic, Paul Trimboli and Con Boutsianis. The feat could not be repeated the next year as the club was eliminated by eventual premiers Adelaide City in a Preliminary Final.

Former player Jim Pyrgolios replaced Puskás for the 1992–93 season which saw the club finish first on the points table during the regular season. South Melbourne was again eliminated during the finals series by Adelaide City and Marconi-Fairfield, the latter inflicting a 7–0 thrashing. In 1993–94, the club finished second, but failed yet again to progress to the Grand Final, courtesy of Melbourne Croatia and their nemesis, Adelaide City. For the 1994–95 season, the club hired former Socceroos coach Frank Arok to replace Pyrgolios. The round one game from that season was the club's last at its Middle Park home before moving temporarily to Olympic Park while they awaited the completion of their new home, the 14,000-capacity Lakeside Stadium, on the site of the former Lake Oval. The club finished sixth on the ladder, but was eliminated again in the Preliminary Final by the Melbourne Knights in a 3–2 thriller in the rain with a hattrick to Mark Viduka. Arok left the club after a disappointing 1995–96 season, which saw South miss the finals for the first time since 1989.

=== Name and emblem change ===
The club emblem during South Melbourne Men's brief appearance as the Lakers.

In 1996, the club was required by Soccer Australia, along with clubs all over the country, to change its emblem and name in an attempt to move soccer into the Australian mainstream and away from direct club-level association with its migrant roots. As a consequence, South Melbourne Hellas reappeared as South Melbourne Lakers. Its new name and emblem was not well received by many of its Greek supporters. The name change also drew attention from American NBA team, the L.A. Lakers, who threatened legal action.

Under new coach and former captain Ange Postecoglou, the club bounced back in season 1996–97, finishing third on the table and eventually being eliminated by Sydney United in the Preliminary Final. The club capped off the end of the decade with impressive performances, becoming Australian champions in 1998 and 1999, thanks to performances by Paul Trimboli, Vaughan Coveny, Con Blatsis and former PAOK star John Anastasiadis.

In the 1998 Grand Final, South Melbourne defeated league newcomer Carlton 2–1 with a controversial late chip by Boutsianis, sending the crowd into pandemonium. That win was followed up in 1999 with a come-from-behind 3–2 win against Sydney United in the Grand Final, which was the first time the club had gone back-to-back since the glory days of the 1960s. This win would be Hellas' fourth and final national championship. By now, South Melbourne had dropped the Lakers moniker and become South Melbourne Soccer Club, and sported a new emblem—the current blue and white shield with stars (each star representing a national championship). They followed up their fourth domestic title with the 1999 Oceania Club Championship, a win that qualified them for the 2000 FIFA Club World Championship in Brazil.

=== 2000–04: Taking on the World ===
Grouped with Vasco Da Gama, Necaxa, and the treble-winning Manchester United in the 2000 FIFA Club World Championship, South Melbourne lost all three games. Despite the losses and being the only non-professional club at the tournament, the club gained some respectability amongst its peers with its performance, as well as some much needed exposure on the world stage, something that had been severely lacking for Australian soccer clubs at the time. On its return from Brazil, South Melbourne failed to make the finals in the 1999–2000 season, finishing well outside the top six finals spots. Before the new season started, Postecoglou left South Melbourne in order to take up the position of Australian youth coach, and was replaced by former South player and teammate Mike Petersen. At the end of the 2000–01 home and away season, South Melbourne had finished a comfortable eight points clear of Wollongong, but lost both legs of its major semi-final against the Wolves 2–1, meaning South Melbourne would have to win the preliminary final in order to earn a rematch. They duly did so, with a 2–0 victory over Sydney Olympic, but put in a lacklustre performance in the Grand Final, with a late revival not being enough once more losing 2–1.

Prior to the start of the 2001–2002 season, South Melbourne suffered a major blow as Petersen, along with several players including Boutsianis and Andy Vlahos left to join the Football Kingz. A young squad under the management of Eddie Krncevic struggled, occupying the bottom rungs of the table halfway through the season, before the return in controversial circumstances of Boutsianis sparked a major revival, which saw the club finish fifth in the standings, eventually being eliminated by eventual champions Olympic Sharks in the finals.

Krnčević was replaced by former player Danny Wright for the 2002–03 season, but the club failed to reach the finals by a point. Stuart Munro took over as coach for the 2003–04 season, with the club finishing fifth, eventually being eliminated by a penalty deep into extra time against Adelaide United in what turned out to be South's final game in the NSL.

With the combined factors of the demise of the NSL, and poor financial management, South Melbourne fell into voluntary administration and lost most of its squad. With Melbourne being allocated just one licence for an A-League team, which was widely expected to go to a new franchise, and with the club in extreme financial difficulty, South Melbourne chose not to lodge an application to join the new competition.

=== Return to Victorian competition ===
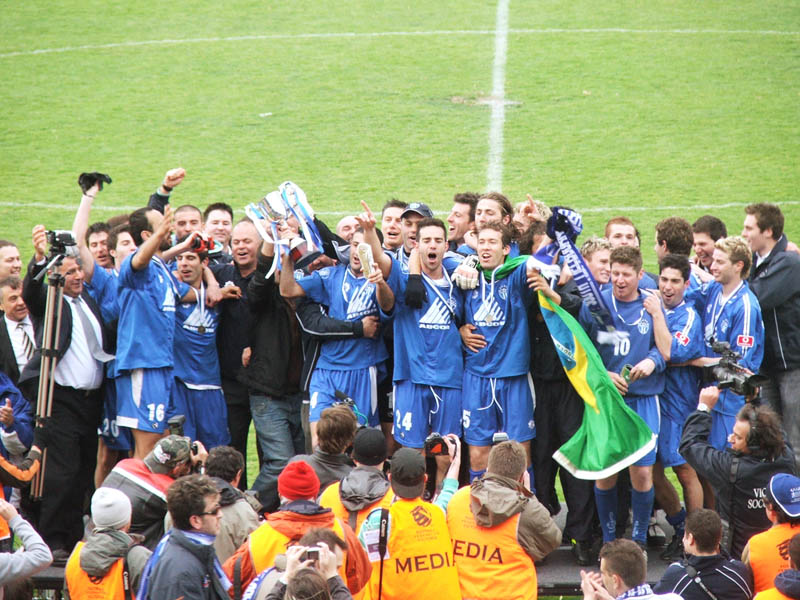
South Melbourne celebrate their 2006 VPL title

Entering the Victorian Premier League in 2005 as South Melbourne Football Club, and with a new team under former player and new coach John Anastasiadis, the club reached the Preliminary Final of the VPL, going down to their old rivals Heidelberg United. The season was highlighted by fluctuating crowd attendances at home games, national media attention paid to crowd trouble with fans of Preston Lions, but also by good performances by a young and talented side, which before the season had been a relegation favourite.

In 2006, South Melbourne finished third in the table, courtesy of a strong home record, including a record 7–0 thrashing of old foe Melbourne Knights. They eventually progressed to the final, by defeating Green Gully and Altona Magic in successive weeks. In the final itself, once more against Altona Magic, a second half goal by Gianni De Nittis was enough to see South Melbourne win the game 1–0, and win their eighth Victorian championship, their first in 30 years, and first since returning to the competition in 2005.

In 2007, South Melbourne had a poor year, finishing in seventh place, missing the finals; after a poor start in 2008, Anastasiadis resigned. With another former player Michael Michalakopoulos taking charge, the team moved away from the relegation zone, but still missed the finals.

The club celebrated its 50th anniversary year during the 2009 season, with several heritage strips and a logo reminiscent of the pre-1990s logo used to mark the occasion. The club secured the services of Vaughan Coveny, recently retired from A-League soccer, who went on to score his 100th goal for the club, with Ramazan Tavsancioglu and Fernando de Moraes also marking personal milestones by playing their 100th games. Michalakopoulos departed, after the club bowed out early in the finals series, to be replaced as coach by Vaughan Coveny.

The 2010 season saw drastic changes to the club with the re-development of Bob Jane Stadium commencing several rounds in the season. This forced the club to relocate the remainder of its 2010 home fixtures, and all of its 2011 home matches, to John Cain Memorial Park in a sharing arrangement with Northcote City. The arrival of high-profile players including Carl Recchia, Peter Zois and Joe Keenan among others brought a renewed hope of on-field success to the supporters. Despite some good on-field performances and individual brilliance, with Fernando de Moraes winning the VPL Player of the Year and Peter Zois taking out the Goalkeeper of the Year award, the promised success did not eventuate with the club narrowly missing out on a finals berth.

Meanwhile, the club gained much international recognition with the award of being the Oceania Club of the Century by the International Federation of Football History & Statistics at a lavish gala ceremony at the Hurlingham Club in Fulham, London in May 2010 and entry into the 2010 Singapore Cup. South Melbourne miraculously won its first-round match against Gombak United 2–1, and returned to Singapore in October for a two-legged playoff against Bangkok Glass at the Jalan Besar Stadium, but were knocked out by the eventual champions 6–4 on aggregate. Coveny was replaced as coach after the end of the VPL season for the Singapore Cup tie by Eddie Krncevic, who returned to the club after a stint as coach in the 2001–2002 NSL season. The club travelled to Singapore again for the 2011 Singapore Cup, but were bundled out in the first round by Albirex Niigata.

Under Krncevic, the club rallied late in the 2011 VPL season to finish fourth, but had their season ended in a penalty shootout in the semi-final by Oakleigh Cannons. Krncevic was replaced in 2012 by former player Peter Tsolakis, who moved across from Northcote City with several players. 2012 saw the return of South Melbourne to their home ground, now known as Lakeside Stadium, with vastly improved amenities, a second grandstand and an international-standard athletics track, which was opened in December 2011 with a friendly against old foes Sydney Olympic. However, the club could not capitalise on its own turf, with terrible home form condemning the club to finish outside the top five, and miss out on finals once again.

In July 2013, Tsolakis resigned from his post after the board sacked five senior squad members without his consultation and the club appointed former Sunshine George Cross, Melbourne Knights and Dandenong Thunder manager Chris Taylor on a two-year deal. South Melbourne finished the season in fourth place.

=== National Premier League era ===
In 2014, the club entered the National Premier Leagues Victoria competition, which replaced the old Victorian Premier League. South had a fantastic season, taking out their first league title since their 2000–01 NSL title. In the NPL National Finals Series, South Melbourne beat South Hobart 1–0 at the South Hobart Ground, but lost to North Eastern MetroStars in the semi-final 2–1.

In 2015, the club retained the NPL Victoria premiership, but lost to rivals Bentleigh Greens in the Grand Final. South Melbourne also won the Dockerty Cup, but lost to Palm Beach in the 2015 FFA Cup Round of 32.

South Melbourne then recruited the likes of Matthew Foschini, Matt Millar and Marcus Schroen for the following season. South got season 2016 off on a bad note, losing the FFV Community Shield 3–0 to Bentleigh, but opened the NPL Victoria season on an emphatic note, beating traditional rivals Heidelberg United 6–0 in front of over 3,000 fans at Lakeside. On 30 March 2016, South Melbourne announced that it had secured a 40-year lease of Lakeside Stadium, with the club now "able to commence building its new administrational offices, museum, futsal court and bistro / social room in its exclusive areas." South Melbourne bowed out of the 2016 FFA Cup qualifying rounds at the final qualifying round, losing 4–0 to rivals Bentleigh Greens. The club finished in third place in the league, but went on to win the Championship through the finals series, beating Hume City 3-0 and then Oakleigh Cannons 3–2 in the grand final. South Melbourne began construction on its exclusive areas at Lakeside Stadium in October 2016, with the development including the building of a new social club, futsal court and club offices.

In 2017, South Melbourne finished runners-up in the league behind traditional rivals Heidelberg United. In the finals series, Hellas lost to eventual champions Bentleigh Greens in a penalty shoot-out in the semi-final. After reaching the 2017 FFA Cup national stages, South Melbourne defeated Edgeworth, Sorrento and Gold Coast City to reach the semi-finals where they hosted Sydney at Lakeside Stadium, eventually going down 5–1 to the reigning A-League champions in front of almost 6,000 people.

On the eve of the 2018 season, manager Chris Taylor and the club parted ways after four and a half seasons. He was replaced by South Melbourne Men's U-20 manager Saša Kolman.

In the off-season, the club announced that Con Tangalakis had been appointed as the senior head coach on a permanent basis, after guiding them to survival while on an interim basis the season prior. The club then farewelled three-time NPL Golden Boot and five-time club Golden Boot winner Milos Lujic after five years of service to the club. After a start to the season, which saw the club manage two wins, a draw and four losses, leaving South Melbourne in eleventh place, senior coach Con Tangalakis offered his resignation, and senior assistant coach Esteban Quintas was appointed in a caretaker role to see out the 2019 season.

=== Australian Championship, OFC Professional League era ===
In 2025, South Melbourne was announced as one of the eight foundation clubs in the new Australian Championship competition. They won the inaugural Australian Championship title in 2025.

On 29 August 2025, South Melbourne were announced as one of the eight founding members of the OFC Professional League by the Oceanian Football Confederation (OFC); they are Australia's only member in the competition and also the only member outside of the OFC. They made it to the final of the inaugural OFC Professional League, but were beaten 2–1 by Auckland FC at Eden Park.

On 10 October 2026, South Melbourne won the Australia Cup, the country's domestic cup competition, defeating A-League Men's side Melbourne Victory in the final (on penalties). Their victory made Hellas the first side outside of the A-League to win the competition.

== Stadium ==
From its formation in 1959, Hellas played its home game at Middle Park Stadium. The ground with an 18,000 seat capacity was a fully enclosed venue by 1960, and a grandstand built by South Melbourne Hellas and Melbourne Hakoah, partly with funds lent to it by the Albert Park management authority was opened in the May 1961. The stadium saw many sellout crowds as South Melbourne made the jump to state league club to National league in 1977.

In 1993, the Victorian Government made a successful bid to bring the Australian Formula 1 Grand Prix to Melbourne with the agreement that the running track would be in Albert Park. South Melbourne were forced to move from their home ground due to the installation of the track. On October 23, 1994, the final match at Middle Park was played as South Melbourne hosted traditional rivals Heidelberg Alexander beating them 4–1 in front of a sold-out crowd.

South Melbourne moved to Lakeside Stadium in 1995. The stadium was built with a capacity of 14,000 people. A grandstand with an approximate capacity of 3,000 people was situated on one side, with a social club, reception centre and administrative facilities built in, while the other three sides of the ground consisted of open terraces with wooden seats. At one stage, a second two tiered stand for the outer side was proposed, but only preliminary plans were produced.

As well as being the home of South Melbourne, the venue also hosted games by the Socceroos, Young Socceroos, Australia's national women's team the Matildas, and grand finals and finals matches of the Victorian Premier League (now National Premier Leagues Victoria). It has also been a training base for the Greece national football team, France national football team and the Brazilian football national team.

In May 2008, the state government announced that Lakeside Stadium would undergo a major redevelopment, in order to accommodate an athletics track, as part of moving Athletics Victoria from Olympic Park. The Victorian Institute of Sport, Athletics Victoria and South Melbourne FC would share tenancy of the venue. Major Projects Victoria committed $60 million to the project. South Melbourne played its final match under the old Lakeside Stadium's in April 2010, and construction work on the remodelled venue began in June 2010. Under the remodelling, the old grandstand stand was refurbished to house the VIS and included a state of the art gym, swimming pool and clubrooms. A blue running track in reference to the home colour of the club was also constructed for the Athletics division.

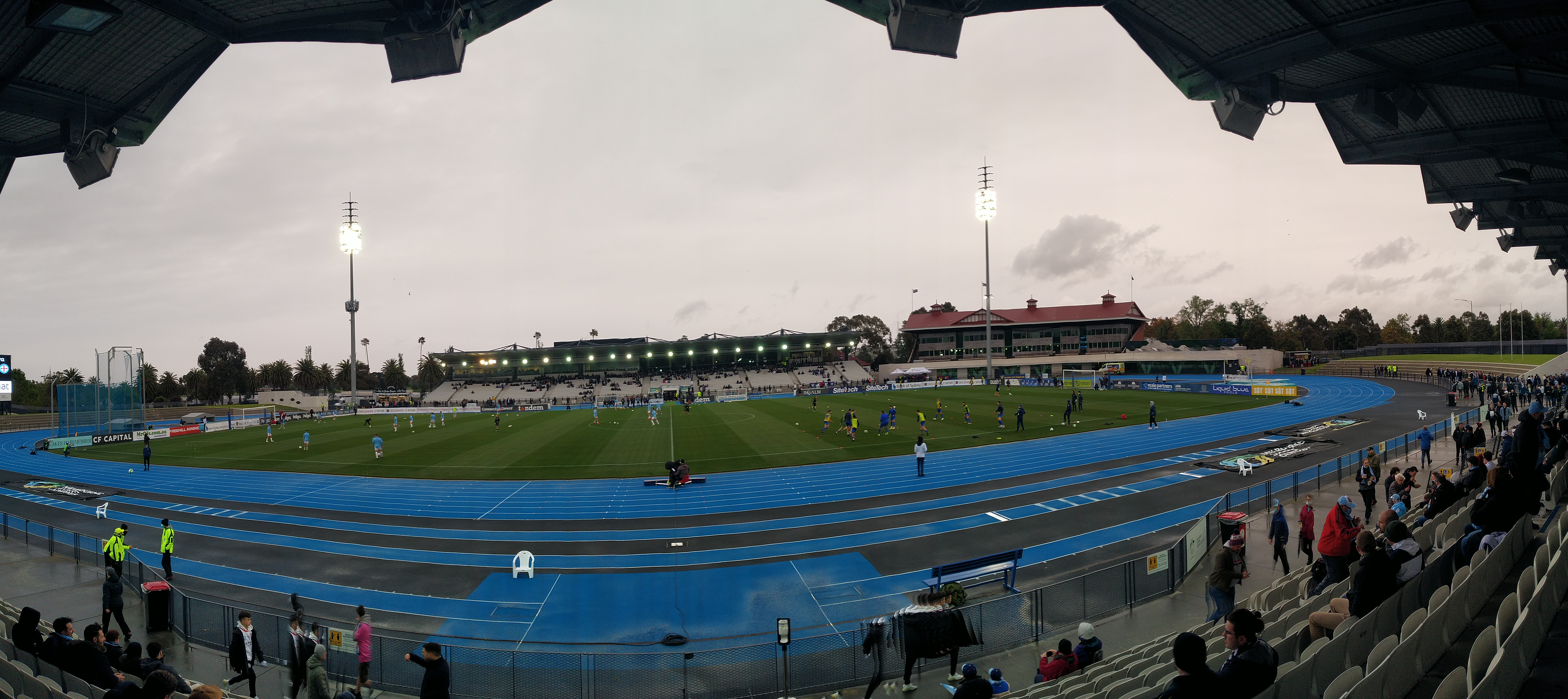
A panorama of Lakeside Stadium before the 2021 FFA Cup match between South Melbourne and Melbourne City

== Rivals ==
Being one of the top placed sides since their inception, South Melbourne have numerous rivalries stemming from their participation in the State Leagues, National Soccer League and VPL/NPL.

- Melbourne Knights
- Heidelberg United
- Preston Lions
- Sydney Olympic

== Supporters ==
South Melbourne have traditionally been one of the most supported clubs in Australia. The main supporter faction is known as the Clarendon Corner, which place themselves in the corner of the stadium.

== A-League aspirations ==
Since dropping out of the national competition at the demise of the NSL, the club has held aspirations to return to the top flight of competition for soccer clubs in Australia. On 14 February 2007, South Melbourne announced their interest in becoming the second Victorian club in the A-League. In June 2008, South Melbourne sent a letter of interest to join the league and lodged an application for the second Melbourne licence as part of the Southern Cross consortium. However, in September 2008 the FFA entered into 'exclusive' negotiations with the rival Melbourne Heart bid, which resulted in them joining the competition for the 2010-11 A-League season.

In March 2013 the club was in negotiations to take a stake in the cash-strapped Central Coast Mariners, but talks cooled off when the Mariners ownership structure was consolidated under Mike Charlesworth.

Additionally, offers were made in 2013 to take a 100 per cent stake in Melbourne Heart, but were rejected. Melbourne Heart management subsequently accepted an offer from Manchester City for club ownership and control.

In November 2016, a further bid for an A-League licence was touted. The club provisionally appointed Roberto Carlos (former Brazilian and Real Madrid player) as the team's head coach, should they be granted an expansion slot. A further bid was submitted in September 2018; however, the Western Melbourne Group consortium was selected as the successful expansion bid in December 2018, which resulted in Western United joining the competition for the 2019-20 A-League season.

In August 2026, the club signaled its intention to open formal dialogue with the Australian Professional Leagues and other stakeholders regarding the prospect of securing a future licence for both the A-League Men's and A-League Women's competitions.

== Sponsorships ==
Period	Kit manufacturer	Shirt sponsor	Other sponsor(s)
2026–	Kappa	Directed Group	

== Players ==
=== Current squad ===
As of 15 October 2026

Note: Flags indicate national team as defined under FIFA eligibility rules; some limited exceptions apply. Players may hold more than one non-FIFA nationality.

No.	Pos.	Nation	Player
1	GK	ESP	Javier Díaz López
2	MF	AUS	Christian Polyzoudis
3	DF	AUS	Jordon Lampard
4	DF	AUS	Marco Janković (captain)
5	DF	AUS	Hassan Ramazani
7	MF	NZL	David Yoo
8	MF	AUS	Paulo Retre
9	FW	NZL	Kosta Barbarouses
10	FW	AUS	Bul Juach
11	FW	JPN	Yuki Uchida
12	DF	AUS	Richard Nkomo
13	FW	AUS	James Lackay

No.	Pos.	Nation	Player
14	MF	AUS	Alex Menelaou
15	FW	AUS	Jordan Swibel
16	MF	RSA	Arran Cocks
17	MF	AUS	Thomas Giannakopoulos
18	FW	AUS	Andre Skapoulas
19	FW	AUS	Andrico Mesourouni
20	GK	AUS	Jake Charlston
21	MF	AUS	Sebastian Pasquali
22	MF	AUS	Max Mikkola
23	DF	AUS	Jacob Eliopoulos
27	DF	AUS	Jack Painter-Andrews

=== Out on loan ===
Note: Flags indicate national team as defined under FIFA eligibility rules; some limited exceptions apply. Players may hold more than one non-FIFA nationality.

No.	Pos.	Nation	Player
30	GK	AUS	Iliya Shalamanov-Trenkov (at Altona Magic until end of Australian Championship season.)

== Competition timeline ==
South Melbourne won eight premierships, two Dockerty Cups, and two Ampol Cups before their entrance into the National Soccer League (NSL) in 1977. In the 1984 season, they won their first NSL premiership and their first championship, defeating Sydney Olympic 4–2 over a 2-legged Grand Final. They won another four premierships and three championships, only in the 1997–98 season winning the double again, before the NSL folded in 2004. The club didn't enter the newly formed national competition, the A-League, due to the bidding process and one team for one state rule, and returned to playing at state level, entering the Victorian Premier League.

== OFC Professional League results ==
Season	OFC Professional League								Position	Playoff	Finals	Top goalscorer(s)	
Season	Pld	W	L	D	GF	GA	GD	Pts	Position	Playoff	Finals	Name(s)	Goals
2026	14	7	4	3	40	18	+22	25	2th	1st	Finalist	(Australia) Jordan Swibel	10

== Coaching history ==
Country	Name	Period
(Second Hellenic Republic)	Christos Georgoussis	(1960–1961)
(Australia)	Len Young	(1961)
(Egypt) / (Australia)	Manny Poulakakis	(1961–1964)
(Australia)	Ron Sawecki	(1965–1966)
(Second Hellenic Republic)	Kostas Nestoridis	(1966)
(Scotland) / (Australia)	John Anderson	(1967)
(Second Hellenic Republic)	Kostas Nestoridis	(1967–1968)
(Kingdom of Serbia)	Ljubiša Broćić	(1968)
(Australia)	Ron Sawecki	(1968–1969)
(Egypt) / (Australia)	Manny Poulakakis	(1969)
(Kingdom of Serbia)	Ljubiša Broćić	(1970–1971)
(Australia)	Bill Curran	(1972)
(Egypt) / (Australia)	Manny Poulakakis	(1972–1973)
(Australia)	Jim Pyrgolios	(1974)
(Australia)	John Margaritis	(1975)
(England)	Brian Edgley	(1976)
(Egypt) / (Australia)	Manny Poulakakis	(1976)
(Australia)	John Margaritis	(1977)
(Scotland)	Dave MacLaren	(1977–1979)
(Scotland)	Duncan MacKay	(1979)
(Australia)	John Margaritis	(1979–1981)
(Scotland)	Tommy Docherty	(1982–1983)
(Australia)	Mick Watson	(1983)
(Kingdom of Yugoslavia)	Rale Rasic	(1983)
(Australia)	Len McKendry	(1983–1985)
(Australia)	John Margaritis	(1986)
(England)	Brian Garvey	(1987–1989)
(Kingdom of Hungary) / (Spain)	Ferenc Puskás	(1989–1992)
(Australia)	Jim Pyrgolios	(1992–1994)
(Kingdom of Yugoslavia) / (Australia)	Frank Arok	(1994–1996)
(Greece) / (Australia)	Ange Postecoglou	(1996–2000)
(Australia)	Mike Petersen	(2000–2001)
(Australia)	Eddie Krncevic	(2001–2002)
(Australia)	Danny Wright	(2002–2003)
(Scotland)	Stuart Munro	(2003–2004)
(Australia)	John Anastasiadis	(2005–2008)
(Australia)	Michael Michalakopoulos	(2008–2009)
(New Zealand)	Vaughan Coveny	(2010–2011)
(Australia)	Eddie Krncevic	(2011–2012)
(Australia)	Peter Tsolakis	(2012–2013)
(England) / (Australia)	Chris Taylor	(2013–2018)
(Slovenia)	Saša Kolman	(2018)
(Australia)	Con Tangalakis	(2018–2019)
(Argentina)	Esteban Quintas	(2019–2025)
(Australia) / (Serbia)	Sinisa Cohadzic	(2025–2026)
(Australia) / (Greece)	Sam Poutakidis	(2026*)
(Australia) / (Serbia)	Sinisa Cohadzic	(2026)

== Honours ==
=== Club ===
National

- National Soccer League
  - Champions (4): 1984, 1990–91, 1997–98, 1998–99
  - Premiers (3): 1992–93, 1997–98, 2000–01
  - Conference Winners (2): 1984, 1985
- National Soccer League Cup
  - Winners (2): 1989–90, 1995–96
- Australia Cup
  - Winners (1): 2026
- Australian Championship
  - Champions (1): 2025
- Australian Club of the Decade (1): 1990s

State

- FFV Community Shield
  - Champions (2): 2015, 2025
  - Runners-up (2): 2016, 2017
- National Premier Leagues/Victorian Premier League
  - Champions (10): 1962, 1964, 1965, 1966, 1972, 1974, 1976, 2006, 2014, 2016
  - Premiers (3): 2015, 2022, 2024
  - Runners-up (6): 1971, 1975, 2015, 2022, 2023, 2024
- Victorian State League Division 1
  - Champions (1): 1960
- Dockerty Cup
  - Winners (10): 1974, 1975, 1988, 1989, 1991, 1993, 1995, 2015, 2024, 2025
- Victorian Ampol Night Soccer Cup
  - Winners (4): 1969, 1970, 1976, 1982
- Buffalo Cup
  - Winners (1): 1988
- Hellenic Cup
  - Winners (4) 1984, 2007, 2009, 2011

Continental

- OFC Professional League
  - Runners-up (1): 2026
- OFC Champions League
  - Winners (1): 1999
- 'Oceania Confederation Club of the Century

Worldwide

- FIFA Club World Cup
  - Eighth place (1): 2000

Youth

- National Youth League

Champions (3): 1984, 1991, 1994

=== Women ===
- National Premier Leagues Victoria Women

Champions (5): 2011, 2014, 2015, 2017, 2023
Premiers (4): 2013, 2014, 2017, 2018

- Nike FC Cup

Champions (1): 2025

=== Individual ===
Johnny Warren Medal/Player of the Year

- 1986 – Bobby Russell
- 1988 – Paul Wade
- 1992/93 – Paul Trimboli
- 1997/98 – Paul Trimboli

Joe Marston Medal

- 1997/98 – Fausto De Amicis
- 1998/99 – Goran Lozanovski

Leading goalscorer

- 1983 – Doug Brown
- 1984 – Doug Brown
- 1985 – Charlie Egan
- 1991/92 – Kimon Taliadoros
- 1992/93 – Francis Awaritefe

Sam Papasavas Award (Under 21 NSL player of the year)

- 1983 – Oscar Crino
- 1988 – Paul Trimboli
- 1989 – Paul Trimboli

NSL Goalkeeper of the Year

- 1998/99 – Michael Petkovic
- 2000/01 – Michael Petkovic
- 2001/02 – Michael Petkovic

NSL Coach of the Year

- 1980 – John Margaritis
- 1988 – Brian Garvey
- 1992/93 – Jim Pyrgolios
- 1997/98 – Ange Postecoglou
- 2000/01 – Mike Petersen

Mark Viduka Medal

- 2026 – Javier Díaz López

Michael Cockerill Medal

- 2026 – Marco Janković

Bill Fleming Award

- 1971 – Jim Pyrgolios
- 1974 – Jimmy Armstrong

Victorian Premier League Top Goalscorer Award

- 1966 – Kostas Nestoridis
- 1972 – Jimmy Armstrong
- 1974 – Jimmy Armstrong
- 1975 – Fethon Ileris

Victorian Premier League Goalkeeper of the Year

- 1975 – Reno Lia
- 2005 – Dean Anastasiadis
- 2006 – Dean Anastasiadis
- 2010 – Peter Zois
- 2013 – Peter Gavalas

Jimmy Rooney Medal

- 2006 – Fernando de Moraes

Victorian Premier League player of the year

- 2010 – Fernando de Moraes
- 2014 – Milos Lujic

Preceded by St George	NSL Champions; 1984	Succeeded by Brunswick Juventus
Preceded by Sydney Olympic	NSL Champions; 1990/91	Succeeded by Adelaide City
Preceded by Brisbane Strikers	NSL Champions; 1997/98-1998/99	Succeeded by Wollongong Wolves
Preceded by Adelaide City (1987)	OFC Champions League Champions; 1999	Succeeded by Wollongong Wolves (2000–01)
