= Carlton SC =

Australian soccer club

Carlton
- Full name: Carlton Soccer Club
- Nickname: Blues
- Founded: 1997; 29 years ago
- Dissolved: 2000; 26 years ago
- Ground: Princes Park, Melbourne
- Capacity: 35,000
- Chairman: Jack Reilly
- Coach: Eddie Krnčević
Home colours	Away colours	Third colours

Carlton Soccer Club is a defunct Australian soccer club. It participated in the National Soccer League (NSL) from the 1997–98 season until round eight of the 2000–01 season, after which it folded. The club was strongly linked to the Australian rules football club Carlton, and suffered from poor crowds. It was suspected that these ties stopped crowds from growing as supporters of other Australian rules teams would not support the Carlton Soccer Club.

On the field, Carlton had a successful debut season, coming runner-up to South Melbourne. They were unable to make the finals the next year, but bounced back in season 1999–2000, being beaten in the Preliminary Final by eventual champion Wollongong. This would prove to be their last full season, as Carlton's financial woes forced the withdrawal of the side from the 2000–01 season after eight rounds.

Former players include former Socceroos team members Mark Bresciano, Vince Grella, Archie Thompson, Joshua Kennedy, Simon Colosimo, Andrew Marth, Dean Anastasiadis, John Markovski, Steve Horvat and A-League players Daniel Allsopp, Robbie Middleby and Andrew Packer.

It was once reported that the former owners of the club, headed by sports agent Peter Jess, were still receiving significant payments when former Carlton players transferred between clubs in Europe.

Like their sister AFL club, the club was sponsored by American sportswear company Nike.

== Honours ==
- National Youth League (1) – 1999–2000

== Records ==
- Record Games Holder: (Australia) Dean Anastasiadis – 92
- Record Goals Holder: (Brazil) Alex Moreira – 27
