= 2003–04 Football Kingz FC season =

Football Kingz
2003–04 season
- Stadium: Ericsson Stadium; Waikato Stadium
- National Soccer League: 13rd
- Top goalscorer: Harry Ngata (8)
- Highest home attendance: 2,304 vs. Newcastle United (21 September 2003); National Soccer League
- Lowest home attendance: 892 vs. South Melbourne (14 February 2004); National Soccer League
- Average home league attendance: 1,272
- Biggest win: 3–1 vs. Marconi Fairfield (23 November 2003); National Soccer League; 2–0 vs. South Melbourne (14 February 2004); National Soccer League
- Biggest defeat: 0–6 vs. South Melbourne (30 November 2003); National Soccer League

The 2003–04 season was the fifth and final season in the history of Football Kingz. It was also the fifth and final season in the National Soccer League.

== Players ==
Note: Flags indicate national team as defined under FIFA eligibility rules; some limited exceptions apply. Players may hold more than one non-FIFA nationality.

No.	Pos.	Nation	Player
1	GK	NZL	Michael Utting
2	DF	NZL	David Rayner
3	DF	NOR	Aleksander Midtsian
4	MF	NZL	Glen Collins
5	DF	AUS	John Tambouras
6	MF	NZL	Chris Jackson
7	MF	NZL	Mark Burton
8	MF	NZL	Jeremy Christie
10	MF	NZL	Jeff Campbell
11	MF	NZL	Noah Hickey
12	MF	NZL	Harry Ngata (Captain)
14	DF	NZL	Jason Rowley
15	DF	CHI	Mauro Donoso
16	DF	NZL	Darren Young

No.	Pos.	Nation	Player
17	FW	AUS	Brad Scott
18	MF	NZL	Chad Coombes
19	FW	NOR	Espen Schjerven
21	DF	NZL	Riki van Steeden
22	FW	AUS	Paul Harries
23	FW	AUS	Tallan Martin
24	MF	ENG	Paul Seaman
25	MF	NZL	Mark Beldham
28	DF	NZL	Craig Wylie
29	MF	NZL	Michael Williams
30	DF	NZL	Danny Hay
34	GK	NZL	Tamati Williams
—	FW	NZL	Campbell Banks
—	GK	NZL	Ross Nicholson

== Competitions ==
=== Overview ===
Competition	First match	Last match	Starting round	Final position	Record							
Competition	First match	Last match	Starting round	Final position	Pld	W	D	L	GF	GA	GD	Win %
National Soccer League	21 September 2003	29 February 2004	Matchday 1	13rd	24	4	3	17	25	51	−26	16.67
Total					24	4	3	17	25	51	−26	16.67

Source: Competitions

=== National Soccer League ===
==== League table ====
Pos	Team	Pld	W	D	L	GF	GA	GD	Pts
9	Wollongong Wolves	24	8	5	11	34	41	−7	29
10	Sydney United	24	7	8	9	18	25	−7	29
11	Newcastle United	24	6	6	12	18	33	−15	24
12	Melbourne Knights	24	6	5	13	21	41	−20	23
13	Football Kingz	24	4	3	17	25	51	−26	15

Source: ozfootball.net
Rules for classification: 1) Points; 2) Goal difference; 3) Goals scored;

==== Results by round ====
Round	1	2	3	4	5	6	7	8	9	10	11	12	13	14	15	16	17	18	19	20	21	22	23	24	25	26
Ground	H	A	A	H	H	A	B	H	A	H	A	H	A	A	H	H	A	A	H	B	A	H	A	H	A	H
Result	L	L	L	L	L	W	✖	L	D	W	L	L	D	L	L	L	L	L	D	✖	L	L	L	W	L	W
Position	11	11	12	13	13	13	12	12	13	12	12	13	12	13	13	13	13	13	13	13	13	13	13	13	13	13

Source: worldfootball.net
A = Away; H = Home; B = Bye; W = Win; D = Draw; L = Loss

==== Matches ====
21 September 2003 1	Football Kingz	1–2	Newcastle United	Auckland
	Ngata 88'	Report	Masi 19'; Wheelhouse 29'	Stadium: Ericsson Stadium; Attendance: 2,304; Referee: D. Rugg

28 September 2003 2	Sydney United	2–1	Football Kingz	Sydney
	Langdon 58'; Zmire 62'	Report	Cunico 52' (o.g.)	Stadium: Sydney United Sports Centre; Attendance: 3,169; Referee: B. Williams

4 October 2003 3	Parramatta Power	4–1	Football Kingz	Sydney
	Dodd 33', 36', 73'; Elrich 90+4'	Report	Martin 57'	Stadium: Parramatta Stadium; Attendance: 1,616; Referee: C. Zetter

12 October 2003 4	Football Kingz	1–3	Perth Glory	Auckland
	Ngata 64'	Report	Despotovski 48'; Pondeljak 57'; Mori 67'	Stadium: Ericsson Stadium; Attendance: 1,245; Referee: D. Rugg

19 October 2003 5	Football Kingz	1–2	Melbourne Knights	Auckland
	Ngata 4'	Report	Pelikan 26'; Oksuz 72'	Stadium: Ericsson Stadium; Attendance: 1,271; Referee: C. Diomis

19 January 2004 6	Wollongong Wolves	1–2	Football Kingz	Wollongong
	Hawrysiuk 2'	Report	Hickey 9'; Ngata 48' (pen.)	Stadium: WIN Stadium; Attendance: 3,226; Referee: B. Williams

8 November 2003 8	Football Kingz	0–2	Northern Spirit	Auckland
		Report	Macallister 55'; Ferguson 68' (pen.)	Stadium: Ericsson Stadium; Attendance: 1,662; Referee: B. Hugo

16 November 2003 9	Sydney Olympic	2–2	Football Kingz	Sydney
	Ishida 10'; Cardozo 36'	Report	Rowley 3'; Souris 45' (o.g.)	Stadium: OKI Jubilee Stadium; Attendance: 2,398; Referee: B. Williams

23 November 2003 10	Football Kingz	3–1	Marconi Fairfield	Auckland
	Tombouras 28'; Martin 65'; Midtsian 78'	Report	Carle 86' (pen.)	Stadium: Ericsson Stadium; Attendance: 1,410; Referee: D. Rugg

30 November 2003 11	South Melbourne	6–0	Football Kingz	Melbourne
	Curcija 3', 57', 72', 85'; Laurie 34'; Tunbridge 90'	Report		Stadium: Bob Jane Stadium; Attendance: 5,005; Referee: C. Diomis

6 December 2003 12	Football Kingz	1–3	Adelaide United	Auckland
	Ngata 80'	Report	Pellegrino 50'; Smeltz 76'; Veart 86'	Stadium: Ericsson Stadium; Attendance: 1,121; Referee: P. Green

10 December 2003 13	Brisbane Strikers	1–1	Football Kingz	Brisbane
	McLaren 10'	Report	Rowley 14'	Stadium: Perry Park; Attendance: 2,336; Referee: P. Green

12 December 2003 14	Newcastle United	2–0	Football Kingz	Newcastle
	Johnson 34'; Deans 55'	Report		Stadium: EnergyAustralia Stadium; Attendance: 1,433; Referee: B. Williams

19 December 2003 15	Football Kingz	0–1	Sydney United	Auckland
		Report	Haliti 45'	Stadium: Ericsson Stadium; Attendance: 1,054; Referee: J. Lewis

28 December 2003 16	Football Kingz	1–2	Parrmatta Power	Hamilton
	Schjerven 34'	Report	Gumprecht 20'; Rech 62'	Stadium: Waikato Stadium; Attendance: 1,176; Referee: C. Zetter

3 January 2004 17	Perth Glory	4–0	Football Kingz	Perth
	Murphy 29'; Faria 56'; Mrdja 62', 78'	Report		Stadium: Members Equity Stadium; Attendance: 9,856; Referee: C. Diomis

7 January 2004 18	Melbourne Knights	1–0	Football Kingz	Melbourne
	Marth 45'	Report		Stadium: Knights Stadium; Attendance: 1,516; Referee: C. Zetter

11 January 2004 19	Football Kingz	1–1	Wollongong Wolves	Auckland
	Martin 13'	Report	Dragas 76'	Stadium: Ericsson Stadium; Attendance: 1,175; Referee: D. Rugg

20 February 2004 21	Northern Spirit	1–0	Football Kingz	Sydney
	Richter 60'	Report		Stadium: Gabbie Stadium; Attendance: 1,061; Referee: C. Zetter

31 January 2004 22	Football Kingz	2–4	Sydney Olympic	Hamilton
	Hickey 51'; Rowley 90+4'	Report	Cardozo 8'; Juric 28'; Bojic 58'; Ishida 63'	Stadium: Waikato Stadium; Attendance: 1,013; Referee: N. Rice

7 February 2004 23	Marconi Fairfield	2–1	Football Kingz	Sydney
	Gibson 31'; Carle 61'	Report	Harries 90+2'	Stadium: Marconi Stadium; Attendance: 1,740; Referee: B. Williams

14 February 2004 24	Football Kingz	2–0	South Melbourne	Auckland
	Hickey 19'; Ngata 59'	Report		Stadium: Ericsson Stadium; Attendance: 892; Referee: P. O'Leary

23 January 2004 25	Adelaide United	1–0	Football Kingz	Adelaide
	Veart 58'	Report		Stadium: Hindmarsh Stadium; Attendance: 12,312; Referee: M. Shield

29 February 2004 26	Football Kingz	4–3	Brisbane Strikers	Auckland
	Hay 42'; Ngata 45' (pen.), 81' (pen.); Christie 76'	Report	McKay 7'; Rose 54'; Fitzsimmons 57'	Stadium: Ericsson Stadium; Attendance: 950; Referee: D. Rugg

== Statistics ==
=== Appearances and goals ===
Players with no appearances not included in the list.

No.	Pos.	Nat.	Name	National Soccer League		Total	
No.	Pos.	Nat.	Name	Apps	Goals	Apps	Goals
1	GK	(New Zealand)	Michael Utting	13	0	13	0
2	DF	(New Zealand)	David Rayner	9(5)	0	14	0
3	DF	(Norway)	Aleksander Midtsian	9(1)	1	10	1
4	MF	(New Zealand)	Glen Collins	14(4)	0	18	0
5	DF	(New Zealand)	John Tambouras	21	1	21	1
6	MF	(New Zealand)	Chris Jackson	19(1)	0	20	0
7	MF	(New Zealand)	Mark Burton	12(1)	0	13	0
8	MF	(New Zealand)	Jeremy Christie	11(1)	1	12	1
10	MF	(New Zealand)	Jeff Campbell	18(5)	0	23	0
11	MF	(New Zealand)	Noah Hickey	7	3	7	3
12	MF	(New Zealand)	Harry Ngata	21(1)	8	22	8
14	DF	(New Zealand)	Jason Rowley	22(1)	2	23	2
15	DF	(Chile)	Mauro Donoso	16	0	16	0
16	DF	(New Zealand)	Darren Young	2(1)	0	3	0
17	FW	(Australia)	Brad Scott	6(5)	0	11	0
18	MF	(New Zealand)	Chad Coombes	0(6)	0	6	0
19	FW	(Norway)	Espen Schjerven	14	1	14	1
22	FW	(Australia)	Paul Harries	9(3)	1	12	1
23	FW	(Australia)	Tallan Martin	9(12)	3	21	3
24	MF	(England)	Paul Seaman	3(3)	0	6	0
25	MF	(New Zealand)	Mark Beldham	4(3)	0	7	0
28	DF	(New Zealand)	Craig Wylie	5(1)	0	6	0
29	MF	(New Zealand)	Michael Williams	1(4)	0	5	0
30	DF	(New Zealand)	Danny Hay	7	1	7	1
34	GK	(New Zealand)	Tamati Williams	1	0	1	0
—	FW	(New Zealand)	Campbell Banks	1	0	1	0
—	GK	(New Zealand)	Ross Nicholson	10(1)	0	11	0

=== Clean sheets ===
Rank	No.	Pos	Nat	Name	National Soccer League	Total
1	1	GK	(New Zealand)	Michael Utting	1	1
Total					1	1
