= 2002–03 Football Kingz FC season =

Football Kingz
2002–03 season
- Stadium: Ericsson Stadium; Waikato Stadium; Yarrow Stadium
- National Soccer League: 11th
- Top goalscorer: Harry Ngata (8)
- Highest home attendance: 3,682 vs. Melbourne Knights (1 November 2002); National Soccer League
- Lowest home attendance: 1,057 vs. Northern Spirit (27 February 2003); National Soccer League
- Average home league attendance: 2,612
- Biggest win: 4–1 vs. Northern Spirit (27 September 2002); National Soccer League
- Biggest defeat: 0–7 vs. Parramatta Power (16 February 2003); National Soccer League

The 2002–03 season was the fourth season in the history of Football Kingz. It was also the fourth season in the National Soccer League.

== Players ==
Note: Flags indicate national team as defined under FIFA eligibility rules; some limited exceptions apply. Players may hold more than one non-FIFA nationality.

No.	Pos.	Nation	Player
1	GK	NZL	Michael Utting
2	DF	NZL	Jonathon Taylor
3	MF	NZL	Mark Atkinson
4	DF	NZL	Nick Haigh
5	DF	NZL	Jonathan Perry
6	MF	NZL	Chris Jackson
7	MF	NZL	Mark Burton
8	MF	CHI	Patricio Almendra
9	FW	NZL	Paul Urlovic
10	MF	NZL	Jeff Campbell
11	FW	AUS	Andrew Vlahos
12	MF	NZL	Harry Ngata
14	DF	NZL	Jason Rowley
15	MF	NZL	Raffaele de Gregorio

No.	Pos.	Nation	Player
16	DF	NZL	Ben Sigmund
17	MF	ENG	Paul Dempsey
18	MF	NZL	Johnny Foundoulakis
19	DF	JPN	Hiroshi Miyazawa
20	GK	NZL	James Bannatyne
21	DF	NZL	Riki van Steeden
22	DF	NZL	James Pritchett
23	DF	NZL	Darren Young
24	MF	NZL	Steven Turner
25	MF	NZL	Mark Beldham
—	DF	AUS	Con Anthopoulos
—	MF	NZL	Jeremy Christie
—	DF	CHI	Mauro Donoso

== Competitions ==
=== Overview ===
Competition	First match	Last match	Starting round	Final position	Record							
Competition	First match	Last match	Starting round	Final position	Pld	W	D	L	GF	GA	GD	Win %
National Soccer League	22 September 2002	16 March 2003	Matchday 1	11th	24	6	6	12	26	45	−19	25.00
Total					24	6	6	12	26	45	−19	25.00

Source: Competitions

=== National Soccer League ===
==== League table ====
Pos	Team	Pld	W	D	L	GF	GA	GD	Pts
9	Melbourne Knights	24	7	6	11	38	52	−14	27
10	Brisbane Strikers	24	7	5	12	38	45	−7	26
11	Football Kingz	24	6	6	12	26	45	−19	24
12	Marconi Fairfield	24	6	5	13	25	42	−17	23
13	Wollongong Wolves	24	5	8	11	25	43	−18	23

Source: rsssf.com
Rules for classification: 1) Points; 2) Goal difference; 3) Goals scored

==== Results by round ====
Round	1	2	3	4	5	6	7	8	9	10	11	12	13	14	15	16	17	18	19	20	21	22	23	24	25	26
Ground	H	A	H	A	H	A	H	A	H	A	B	H	A	H	A	A	H	A	H	A	H	A	H	B	A	H
Result	D	W	L	D	D	L	D	L	W	W	✖	W	L	L	L	L	D	L	L	W	D	L	L	✖	W	L
Position	8	1	5	7	6	9	9	10	9	7	8	5	6	8	9	11	11	11	12	9	10	11	12	12	11	11

Source: worldfootball.net
A = Away; H = Home; B = Bye; W = Win; D = Draw; L = Loss

==== Matches ====
22 September 2002 1	Football Kingz	0–0	Sydney United	Auckland
		Report		Stadium: Ericsson Stadium; Attendance: 2,999; Referee: D. Rugg

27 September 2002 2	Northern Spirit	1–4	Football Kingz	Sydney
	Tomasevic 90' (pen.)	Report	Ngata 3', 18', 83' (pen.), 87'	Stadium: North Sydney Oval; Attendance: 3,289; Referee: A. Nardi

6 October 2002 3	Football Kingz	0–1	Perth Glory	Auckland
		Report	Mori 58'	Stadium: Ericsson Stadium; Attendance: 3,282; Referee: C. Diomis

11 October 2002 4	Wollongong Wolves	0–0	Football Kingz	Wollongong
		Report		Stadium: WIN Stadium; Attendance: 3,681; Referee: J. Lewis

18 October 2002 5	Football Kingz	2–2	Olympic Sharks	Auckland
	Almendra 52', 81' (pen.)	Report	Packer 51'; Harris 54'	Stadium: Ericsson Stadium; Attendance: 2,804; Referee: B. Williams

27 October 2002 6	Adelaide Force	2–1	Football Kingz	Adelaide
	Vidmar 34'; Tunbridge 52'	Report	Almendra 40' (pen.)	Stadium: Hindmarsh Stadium; Attendance: 2,996; Referee: C. Zetter

1 November 2002 7	Football Kingz	2–2	Melbourne Knights	Hamilton
	de Gregorio 47'; Almendra 51' (pen.)	Report	Sabljak 69'; Pelikan 81'	Stadium: Waikato Stadium; Attendance: 3,682; Referee: P. Green

8 November 2002 8	Marconi Fairfield	2–1	Football Kingz	Sydney
	Spiteri 40', 56'	Report	Ngata 69'	Stadium: Marconi Stadium; Attendance: 3,040; Referee: B. Hugo

15 November 2002 9	Football Kingz	2–1	Parramatta Power	Auckland
	Renaud 62' (o.g.); Urlovic 81'	Report	Salapasidis 4'	Stadium: Ericsson Stadium; Attendance: 2,908; Referee: D. Rugg

23 November 2002 10	Brisbane Strikers	0–2	Football Kingz	Brisbane
		Report	Ngata 25'; Almendra 81'	Stadium: Ballymore Stadium; Attendance: 1,695; Referee: A. Nardi

6 December 2002 12	Football Kingz	2–0	Newcastle United	Auckland
	Urlovic 9'; Almendra 65'	Report		Stadium: Ericsson Stadium; Attendance: 2,753; Referee: P. Mur

15 December 2002 13	South Melbourne	3–0	Football Kingz	Melbourne
	Susa 22'; Trimboli 30', 62'	Report		Stadium: Bob Jane Stadium; Attendance: 4,010; Referee: B. Hugo

29 December 2002 15	Sydney United	1–0	Football Kingz	Sydney
	Doumanis 11'	Report		Stadium: Sydney United Sports Centre; Attendance: 2,943; Referee: P. Green

4 January 2003 16	Perth Glory	5–0	Football Kingz	Perth
	Horsley 8'; Pryce 11'; Despotovski 23'; Gumprecht 54', 85'	Report		Stadium: Perth Oval; Attendance: 10,092; Referee: M. Breeze

10 January 2003 17	Football Kingz	1–1	Wollongong Wolves	Auckland
	Vlahos 56'	Report	Heffernan 51'	Stadium: Ericsson Stadium; Attendance: 2,354; Referee: B. Williams

18 January 2003 18	Olympic Sharks	1–0	Football Kingz	Sydney
	Milicic 67'	Report		Stadium: Toyota Park; Attendance: 2,868; Referee: S. Micallef

25 January 2003 19	Football Kingz	0–3	Adelaide Force	New Plymouth
		Report	Lozanovski 15'; Fyfe 21', 64'	Stadium: Yarrow Stadium; Attendance: 2,570; Referee: P. Green

2 February 2003 20	Melbourne Knights	1–2	Football Kingz	Melbourne
	Perry 15' (o.g.)	Report	Vlahos 45'; Ngata 83'	Stadium: Knights Stadium; Attendance: 3,554; Referee: C. Zetter

7 February 2003 21	Football Kingz	0–0	Marconi Fairfield	Auckland
		Report		Stadium: Ericsson Stadium; Attendance: 3,148; Referee: C. Diomis

16 February 2003 22	Parramatta Power	7–0	Football Kingz	Sydney
	Thompson 10'; Buonavoglia 22', 48'; Salapasidis 53', 58', 80'; Cardozo 71'	Report		Stadium: Parramatta Stadium; Attendance: 2,343; Referee: S. Micallef

23 February 2003 23	Football Kingz	0–3	Brisbane Strikers	Auckland
		Report	McKain 10'; Roche 67', 69'	Stadium: Ericsson Stadium; Attendance: 2,535; Referee: M. Breeze

27 February 2003 14	Football Kingz	1–3	Northern Spirit	Auckland
	Beldham 81'	Report	Fisher 9'; Petrie 50'; Kwasnik 67'	Stadium: Ericsson Stadium; Attendance: 1,057; Referee: N. Fox

7 March 2003 25	Newcastle United	1–2	Football Kingz	Newcastle
	Masi 6'	Report	Ngata 5'; Vlahos 87'	Stadium: EnergyAustralia Stadium; Attendance: 4,054; Referee: B. Williams

16 March 2003 26	Football Kingz	4–5	South Melbourne	Auckland
	Donoso 30'; Durakovic 64' (o.g.); Vlahos 66' (pen.); Beldham 83'	Report	Baird 36'; Coveny 39', 54' (pen.); Boutsianis 45'; Buljan 80'	Stadium: Ericsson Stadium; Attendance: 1,252; Referee: S. Micallef

== Statistics ==
=== Appearances and goals ===
Players with no appearances not included in the list.

No.	Pos.	Nat.	Name	National Soccer League		Total	
No.	Pos.	Nat.	Name	Apps	Goals	Apps	Goals
1	GK	(New Zealand)	Michael Utting	22	0	22	0
2	DF	(New Zealand)	Jonathon Taylor	14(2)	0	16	0
3	MF	(New Zealand)	Mark Atkinson	17(2)	0	19	0
5	DF	(New Zealand)	Jonathan Perry	16(1)	0	17	0
6	MF	(New Zealand)	Chris Jackson	20	0	20	0
7	MF	(New Zealand)	Mark Burton	7(4)	0	11	0
8	MF	(Chile)	Patricio Almendra	18	6	18	6
9	FW	(New Zealand)	Paul Urlovic	6(9)	2	15	2
10	MF	(New Zealand)	Jeff Campbell	9(7)	0	16	0
11	FW	(Australia)	Andrew Vlahos	24	4	24	4
12	MF	(New Zealand)	Harry Ngata	22	8	22	8
15	MF	(New Zealand)	Raffaele de Gregorio	20(1)	1	21	1
16	DF	(New Zealand)	Ben Sigmund	1	0	1	0
17	MF	(England)	Paul Dempsey	0(2)	0	2	0
18	MF	(New Zealand)	Johnny Foundoulakis	0(2)	0	2	0
19	DF	(Japan)	Hiroshi Miyazawa	19(2)	0	21	0
20	GK	(New Zealand)	James Bannatyne	2(1)	0	3	0
21	DF	(New Zealand)	Riki van Steeden	3(2)	0	5	0
22	DF	(New Zealand)	James Pritchett	13	0	13	0
23	DF	(New Zealand)	Darren Young	3(2)	0	5	0
24	MF	(New Zealand)	Steven Turner	4(10)	0	14	0
25	MF	(New Zealand)	Mark Beldham	4(9)	2	13	2
—	DF	(Australia)	Con Anthopoulos	8	0	8	0
—	MF	(New Zealand)	Jeremy Christie	3(3)	0	6	0
—	DF	(Chile)	Mauro Donoso	9	1	9	1

=== Clean sheets ===
Rank	No.	Pos	Nat	Name	National Soccer League	Total
1	1	GK	(New Zealand)	Michael Utting	5	5
Total					5	5
