= Glen Collins =

Glen Collins may refer to:

- Glen Collins (footballer) (born 1977), New Zealand association football player
- Glen Collins (American football) (born 1959), former American football player
