= Tatsuhiko Kubo =

Japanese footballer

Tatsuhiko Kubo 久保 竜彦
Personal information
- Full name: Tatsuhiko Kubo
- Date of birth: June 18, 1976 (age 50)
- Place of birth: Chikuzen, Fukuoka, Japan
- Height: 1.81 m (5 ft 11 1/2 in)
- Position: Forward

Youth career
- 1992–1994: Chikuyo Gakuen High School

Senior career*
Years	Team	Apps	(Gls)
1995–2002	Sanfrecce Hiroshima	183	(67)
2003–2006	Yokohama F. Marinos	83	(26)
2007	Yokohama FC	8	(1)
2008–2009	Sanfrecce Hiroshima	27	(3)
2010–2011	Zweigen Kanazawa	50	(15)
2013–2015	Hatsukaichi FC		
Total		351	(112)

International career
1998–2006	Japan	32	(11)
Medal record
Men's football
Representing Japan
AFC Asian Cup
Winner	2000 Lebanon
FIFA Confederations Cup
Runner-up	2001 Korea/Japan
- * Club domestic league appearances and goals

Tatsuhiko Kubo (久保 竜彦, Kubo Tatsuhiko; born June 18, 1976) is a former Japanese football player. He played for Japan national team.

== Club career ==
Kubo was born in Chikuzen, Fukuoka on June 18, 1976. After graduating from high school, he joined Sanfrecce Hiroshima in 1995. He debuted in 1996 and became a regular striker as Takuya Takagi successor from 1998. However the club was relegated to J2 League in 2002. He moved to Yokohama F. Marinos in 2003. In 2003, the club won the champions J1 League. He was also selected Best Eleven and Japanese Footballer of the Year awards. However his opportunity to play decreased for low back pain from 2004. He moved to Yokohama FC in 2007. However the club was relegated to J2 League and he also did not play many matches. After that, he returned to Sanfrecce Hiroshima in 2008 and moved to Zweigen Kanazawa in 2010. He had a career break in 2012 before fully retiring end of 2015 season.

== National team career ==
After 1998 World Cup, in October 1998, Kubo was selected Japan national team by new manager Philippe Troussier. On October 28, he debuted for Japan against Egypt. Although he played at 2000 Asian Cup and 2001 Confederations Cup, his opportunity to play in the matches was few and he was not selected Japan for 2002 World Cup. After 2002 World Cup, in December 2003, he was selected Japan for 2003 East Asian Football Championship and he scored 2 goals against China. This goals were his first goal for Japan. In the first half of 2004, he played as striker and scored 6 goals in 9 games. However, he did not play for low back pain from late 2004. From February 2006, he came back to Japan and he scored 3 goals in 6 matches, however he was not selected Japan for 2006 World Cup. He played 32 games and scored 11 goals for Japan until 2006.

== Career statistics ==
=== Club ===
Appearances and goals by club, season and competition
Club	Season	League			Emperor's Cup		J.League Cup		Asia		Total	
Club	Season	Division	Apps	Goals	Apps	Goals	Apps	Goals	Apps	Goals	Apps	Goals
Sanfrecce Hiroshima	1995	J1 League	0	0	0	0	—		—		0	0
Sanfrecce Hiroshima	1996	J1 League	22	2	3	0	10	4	—		35	6
Sanfrecce Hiroshima	1997	J1 League	22	7	2	0	5	1	—		29	8
Sanfrecce Hiroshima	1998	J1 League	32	12	3	2	3	0	—		38	14
Sanfrecce Hiroshima	1999	J1 League	25	13	0	0	4	1	—		29	14
Sanfrecce Hiroshima	2000	J1 League	24	11	2	1	3	0	—		29	12
Sanfrecce Hiroshima	2001	J1 League	30	15	2	0	6	4	—		38	19
Sanfrecce Hiroshima	2002	J1 League	28	7	4	2	0	0	—		32	9
Sanfrecce Hiroshima	Total		183	67	16	5	31	10	—		230	82
Yokohama F. Marinos	2003	J1 League	25	16	2	1	4	0	—		31	17
Yokohama F. Marinos	2004	J1 League	19	4	0	0	0	0	4	2	23	6
Yokohama F. Marinos	2005	J1 League	10	1	2	4	1	0	2	0	15	5
Yokohama F. Marinos	2006	J1 League	29	5	2	1	4	3	—		35	9
Yokohama F. Marinos	Total		83	26	6	6	9	3	6	2	104	37
Yokohama FC	2007	J1 League	8	1	0	0	1	0	—		9	1
Sanfrecce Hiroshima	2008	J2 League	25	3	2	1	—		—		27	4
Sanfrecce Hiroshima	2009	J1 League	2	0	0	0	0	0	—		2	0
Sanfrecce Hiroshima	Total		27	3	2	1	0	0	—		29	3
Zweigen Kanazawa	2010	Football League	27	9	2	0	—		—		29	9
Zweigen Kanazawa	2011	Football League	23	6	2	0	—		—		25	6
Zweigen Kanazawa	Total		50	15	4	0	—		—		54	15
Career total			351	112	28	12	41	13	6	2	426	139

=== International ===
Japan national team
Year	Apps	Goals
1998	1	0
1999	1	0
2000	5	0
2001	2	0
2002	5	0
2003	3	2
2004	9	6
2005	0	0
2006	6	3
Total	32	11

== National team goals ==
#	Date	Venue	Opponent	Score	Result	Competition
1.	December 4, 2003	Tokyo, Japan	China	2-0	Won	East Asian Football Championship 2003
2.	December 4, 2003	Tokyo, Japan	China	2-0	Won	East Asian Football Championship 2003
3.	February 18, 2004	Saitama, Japan	Oman	1-0	Won	2006 FIFA World Cup qualification
4.	April 25, 2004	Zalaegerszeg, Hungary	Hungary	2-3	Lost	Friendly
5.	April 28, 2004	Prague, Czech Republic	Czech Republic	1-0	Won	Friendly
6.	May 30, 2004	Manchester, England	Iceland	3-2	Won	Friendly
7.	May 30, 2004	Manchester, England	Iceland	3-2	Won	Friendly
8.	June 9, 2004	Saitama, Japan	India	7-0	Won	2006 FIFA World Cup qualification
9.	February 18, 2006	Shizuoka, Japan	Finland	2-0	Won	Friendly
10.	February 22, 2006	Yokohama, Japan	India	6-0	Won	2007 AFC Asian Cup qualification
11.	February 22, 2006	Yokohama, Japan	India	6-0	Won	2007 AFC Asian Cup qualification

== Honors and awards ==
=== Individual ===
- Japanese Footballer of the Year: 2003
- J.League Best Eleven: 2003
- East Asian Football Championship Top Scorer: 2003

=== Team ===
Yokohama F. Marinos

- J1 League: 2003, 2004
- Japanese Super Cup: 2008
