= Kota Hattori =

Japanese footballer

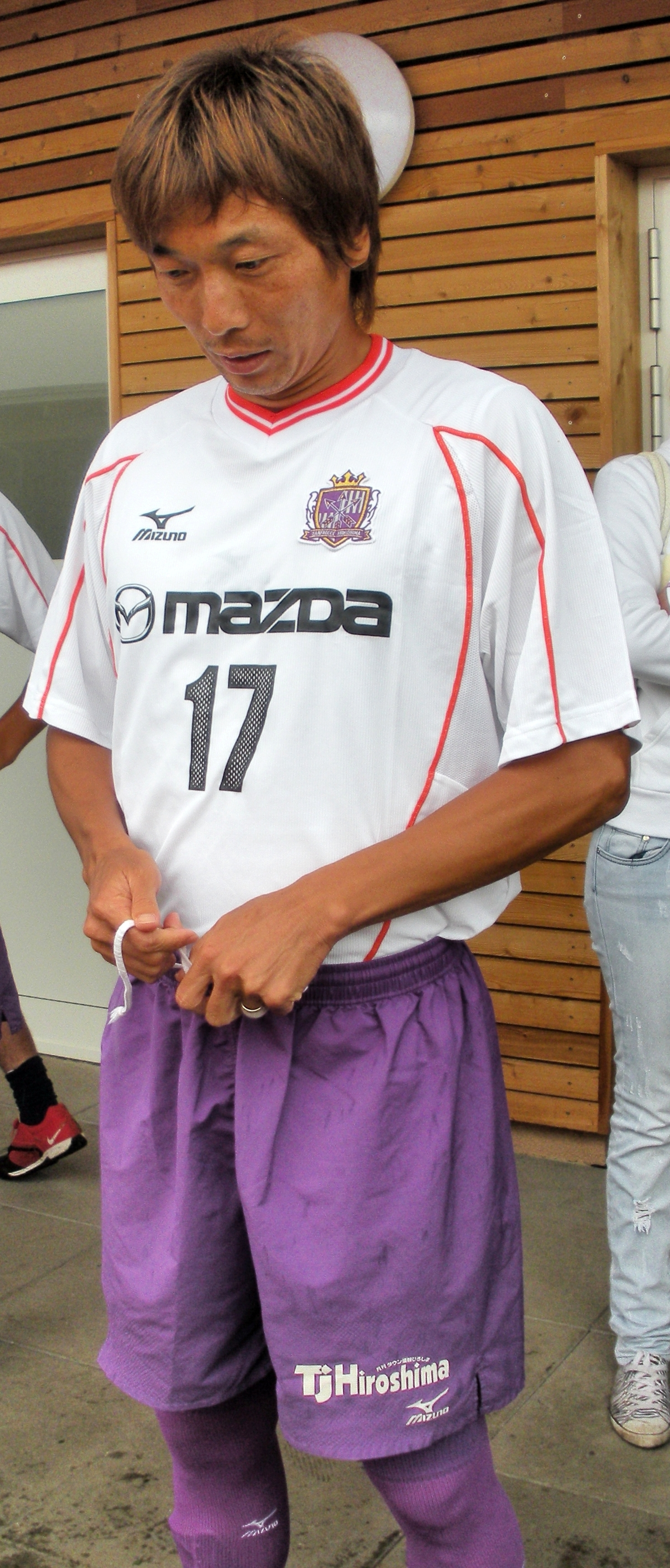

Personal information
- Full name: Kota Hattori
- Date of birth: November 22, 1977 (age 48)
- Place of birth: Narashino, Japan
- Height: 1.75 m (5 ft 9 in)
- Position: Midfielder

Youth career
- 1993–1995: Shibuya Makuhari High School

Senior career*
Years	Team	Apps	(Gls)
1996–2011	Sanfrecce Hiroshima	450	(16)
2012	Fagiano Okayama	14	(0)
Total		464	(16)
Medal record
Sanfrecce Hiroshima
Runner-up	J.League Cup	2010
Runner-up	Emperor's Cup	1996
Runner-up	Emperor's Cup	1999
Runner-up	Emperor's Cup	2007
- * Club domestic league appearances and goals

Kota Hattori (服部 公太, Hattori Kota; born November 22, 1977) is a former Japanese football player.

== Playing career ==
Hattori was born in Narashino on November 22, 1977. After graduating from high school, he joined the J1 League club Sanfrecce Hiroshima in 1996. On November 19, he debuted against Yokohama Marinos in the last match of the 1996 season. In 1998, he became a regular player as left side midfielder and played many matches for a long time. He also played full time for 171 matches in a row from November 2002 to August 2007. The club won second place in the 1999 and 2007 Emperor's Cups and the 2010 J.League Cup. However his opportunity to play decreased in 2020 in favor of a new member named Satoru Yamagishi. In 2012, he moved to the J2 League club Fagiano Okayama. He retired at the end of the 2012 season.

== Club statistics ==
Club performance			League		Cup		League Cup		Continental		Total	
Season	Club	League	Apps	Goals	Apps	Goals	Apps	Goals	Apps	Goals	Apps	Goals
Japan			League		Emperor's Cup		J.League Cup		Asia		Total	
1996	Sanfrecce Hiroshima	J1 League	1	0	0	0	0	0	-		1	0
1997	Sanfrecce Hiroshima	J1 League	18	0	2	0	5	0	-		25	0
1998	Sanfrecce Hiroshima	J1 League	32	1	3	0	3	0	-		38	1
1999	Sanfrecce Hiroshima	J1 League	28	1	4	0	1	0	-		33	1
2000	Sanfrecce Hiroshima	J1 League	29	1	2	0	3	0	-		34	1
2001	Sanfrecce Hiroshima	J1 League	28	0	0	0	5	1	-		33	1
2002	Sanfrecce Hiroshima	J1 League	21	0	4	0	0	0	-		25	0
2003	Sanfrecce Hiroshima	J2 League	44	1	4	1	-		-		48	2
2004	Sanfrecce Hiroshima	J1 League	30	2	1	0	6	0	-		37	2
2005	Sanfrecce Hiroshima	J1 League	34	0	2	0	6	0	-		42	0
2006	Sanfrecce Hiroshima	J1 League	34	1	2	0	5	0	-		41	1
2007	Sanfrecce Hiroshima	J1 League	34	2	5	0	7	1	-		46	3
2008	Sanfrecce Hiroshima	J2 League	41	4	3	2	-		-		44	6
2009	Sanfrecce Hiroshima	J1 League	34	2	2	1	4	0	-		40	3
2010	Sanfrecce Hiroshima	J1 League	25	1	1	0	4	0	5	0	35	1
2011	Sanfrecce Hiroshima	J1 League	17	0	0	0	0	0	-		17	0
2012	Fagiano Okayama	J2 League	14	0	2	0	-		-		16	0
Career total			464	16	37	4	49	2	5	0	555	22

== Honors ==
Individual

- J1 League Fair Play Award - 2009
