= Makoto Okubo =

Japanese footballer

Makoto Okubo 大久保 誠
Personal information
- Full name: Makoto Okubo
- Date of birth: 3 May 1975 (age 51)
- Place of birth: Nagasaki, Japan
- Height: 1.79 m (5 ft 10 in)
- Position: Midfielder

Youth career
- 1991–1993: Nagasaki Nihon University High School
- 1994–1997: Fukuoka University

Senior career*
Years	Team	Apps	(Gls)
1998–2000	Sanfrecce Hiroshima	17	(1)
Total		17	(1)
- * Club domestic league appearances and goals

Makoto Okubo (大久保 誠, Ōkubo Makoto; born 3 May 1975) is a Japanese former professional footballer who played as a midfielder.

== Playing career ==
Okubo was born in Nagasaki Prefecture on 3 May 1975. After graduating from Fukuoka University, he joined J1 League club Sanfrecce Hiroshima in 1998. Although he played as offensive midfielder, he could not play many matches for injury and behind Toshihiro Yamaguchi and Chikara Fujimoto. He retired end of 2000 season.

== Club statistics ==
Appearances and goals by club, season and competition
Club	Season	League			Cup		League Cup		Total	
Club	Season	Division	Apps	Goals	Apps	Goals	Apps	Goals	Apps	Goals
Sanfrecce Hiroshima	1998	J1 League	6	1	0	0	4	1	10	2
Sanfrecce Hiroshima	1999	J1 League	3	0	4	1	0	0	7	1
Sanfrecce Hiroshima	2000	J1 League	8	0	0	0	3	0	11	0
Total			17	1	4	1	7	1	28	3
