= 2009 Sanfrecce Hiroshima season =

Sanfrecce Hiroshima
2009 season
- Manager: Mihailo Petrović
- Stadium: Hiroshima Big Arch
- J. League 1: 4th
- Emperor's Cup: 3rd Round
- J. League Cup: GL-A 3rd
- Top goalscorer: Hisato Satō (15)

2009 Sanfrecce Hiroshima season

== Competitions ==
| Competitions | Position |
|---|---|
| J. League 1 | 4th / 18 clubs |
| Emperor's Cup | 3rd Round |
| J. League Cup | GL-A 3rd / 7 clubs |

== Player statistics ==
| No. | Pos. | Player | D.o.B. (Age) | Height / Weight | J. League 1 | | Emperor's Cup | | J. League Cup | | Total | |
| No. | Pos. | Player | D.o.B. (Age) | Height / Weight | Apps | Goals | Apps | Goals | Apps | Goals | Apps | Goals |
|---|---|---|---|---|---|---|---|---|---|---|---|---|
| 1 | GK | Takashi Shimoda | November 28, 1975 (aged 33) | cm / kg | 0 | 0 | | | | | | |
| 2 | DF | Ilian Stoyanov | January 20, 1977 (aged 32) | cm / kg | 23 | 4 | | | | | | |
| 3 | DF | Shogo Nishikawa | July 1, 1983 (aged 25) | cm / kg | 0 | 0 | | | | | | |
| 5 | DF | Tomoaki Makino | May 11, 1987 (aged 21) | cm / kg | 33 | 8 | | | | | | |
| 6 | MF | Toshihiro Aoyama | February 22, 1986 (aged 23) | cm / kg | 29 | 3 | | | | | | |
| 7 | MF | Kōji Morisaki | May 9, 1981 (aged 27) | cm / kg | 3 | 0 | | | | | | |
| 8 | MF | Kazuyuki Morisaki | May 9, 1981 (aged 27) | cm / kg | 18 | 0 | | | | | | |
| 9 | FW | Tadanari Lee | December 19, 1985 (aged 23) | cm / kg | 8 | 0 | | | | | | |
| 10 | MF | Yosuke Kashiwagi | December 15, 1987 (aged 21) | cm / kg | 33 | 8 | | | | | | |
| 11 | FW | Hisato Satō | March 12, 1981 (aged 27) | cm / kg | 34 | 15 | | | | | | |
| 14 | MF | Mihael Mikić | January 6, 1980 (aged 29) | cm / kg | 25 | 0 | | | | | | |
| 15 | MF | Yojiro Takahagi | August 2, 1986 (aged 22) | cm / kg | 27 | 5 | | | | | | |
| 16 | MF | Ri Han-Jae | June 27, 1982 (aged 26) | cm / kg | 14 | 1 | | | | | | |
| 17 | MF | Kota Hattori | November 22, 1977 (aged 31) | cm / kg | 34 | 2 | | | | | | |
| 18 | FW | Ryuichi Hirashige | June 15, 1988 (aged 20) | cm / kg | 9 | 0 | | | | | | |
| 19 | DF | Kohei Morita | July 13, 1976 (aged 32) | cm / kg | 21 | 1 | | | | | | |
| 20 | MF | Shinichiro Kuwada | December 6, 1986 (aged 22) | cm / kg | 0 | 0 | | | | | | |
| 22 | MF | Tsubasa Yokotake | August 30, 1989 (aged 19) | cm / kg | 16 | 0 | | | | | | |
| 23 | MF | Katsumi Yusa | August 2, 1988 (aged 20) | cm / kg | 0 | 0 | | | | | | |
| 24 | DF | Ryota Moriwaki | April 6, 1986 (aged 22) | cm / kg | 29 | 2 | | | | | | |
| 25 | MF | Issei Takayanagi | September 14, 1986 (aged 22) | cm / kg | 26 | 3 | | | | | | |
| 26 | DF | Yuya Hashiuchi | July 13, 1987 (aged 21) | cm / kg | 1 | 0 | | | | | | |
| 27 | FW | Kohei Shimizu | April 30, 1989 (aged 19) | cm / kg | 1 | 0 | | | | | | |
| 28 | FW | Takuya Marutani | May 30, 1989 (aged 19) | cm / kg | 1 | 0 | | | | | | |
| 29 | MF | Kenta Uchida | October 2, 1989 (aged 19) | cm / kg | 0 | 0 | | | | | | |
| 30 | MF | Sho Shinohara | August 11, 1989 (aged 19) | cm / kg | 0 | 0 | | | | | | |
| 31 | GK | Akihiro Sato | August 30, 1986 (aged 22) | cm / kg | 6 | 0 | | | | | | |
| 32 | MF | Tomotaka Okamoto | June 29, 1990 (aged 18) | cm / kg | 3 | 0 | | | | | | |
| 33 | MF | Takashi Rakuyama | August 11, 1980 (aged 28) | cm / kg | 14 | 0 | | | | | | |
| 34 | GK | Hirotsugu Nakabayashi | April 28, 1986 (aged 22) | cm / kg | 28 | 0 | | | | | | |
| 35 | MF | Koji Nakajima | August 20, 1977 (aged 31) | cm / kg | 30 | 0 | | | | | | |
| 36 | GK | Yutaro Hara | April 23, 1990 (aged 18) | cm / kg | 1 | 0 | | | | | | |
| 38 | FW | Junya Osaki | April 2, 1991 (aged 17) | cm / kg | 1 | 0 | | | | | | |
| 39 | FW | Tatsuhiko Kubo | June 18, 1976 (aged 32) | cm / kg | 2 | 0 | | | | | | |

== Other pages ==
- (in Japanese) J. League official site
