= 1998 Sanfrecce Hiroshima season =

Sanfrecce Hiroshima
1998 season
- Manager: Thomson
- Stadium: Hiroshima Big Arch
- J.League: 10th
- Emperor's Cup: Quarterfinals
- J.League Cup: GL-A 4th
- Top goalscorer: Tatsuhiko Kubo (12)
| Home colours | Away colours |

1998 Sanfrecce Hiroshima season

== Competitions ==
| Competitions | Position |
|---|---|
| J.League | 10th / 18 clubs |
| Emperor's Cup | Quarterfinals |
| J.League Cup | GL-A 4th / 5 clubs |

== Domestic results ==
=== J.League ===
| 21 March 1998 1-1 | Kashiwa Reysol | 0-1 | Sanfrecce Hiroshima | Hitachi Kashiwa Soccer Stadium |
| JST (UTC+09) |

| 25 March 1998 1-2 | Sanfrecce Hiroshima | 0-1 (GG) (a.e.t.) | Gamba Osaka | Hiroshima Stadium |
| JST (UTC+09) |

| 28 March 1998 1-3 | Yokohama Marinos | 4-0 | Sanfrecce Hiroshima | Yokohama Mitsuzawa Stadium |
| JST (UTC+09) |

| 4 April 1998 1-4 | Sanfrecce Hiroshima | 1-2 | Urawa Red Diamonds | Hiroshima Stadium |
| JST (UTC+09) |

| 11 April 1998 1-5 | Nagoya Grampus Eight | 3-2 (GG) (a.e.t.) | Sanfrecce Hiroshima | Mizuho Athletic Stadium |
| JST (UTC+09) |

| 15 April 1998 1-6 | Sanfrecce Hiroshima | 0-1 | Bellmare Hiratsuka | Hiroshima Stadium |
| JST (UTC+09) |

| 18 April 1998 1-7 | Júbilo Iwata | 5-0 | Sanfrecce Hiroshima | Júbilo Iwata Stadium |
| JST (UTC+09) |

| 25 April 1998 1-8 | Sanfrecce Hiroshima | 2-1 (GG) (a.e.t.) | Verdy Kawasaki | Hiroshima Stadium |
| JST (UTC+09) |

| 29 April 1998 1-9 | Vissel Kobe | 0-2 | Sanfrecce Hiroshima | Kobe Universiade Memorial Stadium |
| JST (UTC+09) |

| 2 May 1998 1-10 | Sanfrecce Hiroshima | 3-1 | JEF United Ichihara | Hiroshima Stadium |
| JST (UTC+09) |

| 5 May 1998 1-11 | Yokohama Flügels | 5-1 | Sanfrecce Hiroshima | International Stadium Yokohama |
| JST (UTC+09) |

| 9 May 1998 1-12 | Sanfrecce Hiroshima | 0-2 | Cerezo Osaka | Hiroshima Stadium |
| JST (UTC+09) |

| 25 July 1998 1-13 | Kyoto Purple Sanga | 1-2 | Sanfrecce Hiroshima | Nishikyogoku Athletic Stadium |
| JST (UTC+09) |

| 29 July 1998 1-14 | Avispa Fukuoka | 1-1 (GG) (a.e.t.) (5-3 p) | Sanfrecce Hiroshima | Hakatanomori Football Stadium |
| JST (UTC+09) |

| 1 August 1998 1-15 | Sanfrecce Hiroshima | 4-3 (GG) (a.e.t.) | Consadole Sapporo | Hiroshima Stadium |
| JST (UTC+09) |

| 5 August 1998 1-16 | Shimizu S-Pulse | 1-0 | Sanfrecce Hiroshima | Nihondaira Sports Stadium |
| JST (UTC+09) |

| 8 August 1998 1-17 | Sanfrecce Hiroshima | 3-2 | Kashima Antlers | Hiroshima Stadium |
| JST (UTC+09) |

| 22 August 1998 2-1 | Sanfrecce Hiroshima | 4-0 | Avispa Fukuoka | Hiroshima Big Arch |
| JST (UTC+09) |

| 29 August 1998 2-2 | Consadole Sapporo | 2-0 | Sanfrecce Hiroshima | Sapporo Atsubetsu Park Stadium |
| JST (UTC+09) |

| 5 September 1998 2-3 | Sanfrecce Hiroshima | 2-2 (GG) (a.e.t.) (8-7 p) | Shimizu S-Pulse | Hiroshima Big Arch |
| JST (UTC+09) |

| 12 September 1998 2-4 | Kashima Antlers | 0-2 | Sanfrecce Hiroshima | Kashima Soccer Stadium |
| JST (UTC+09) |

| 15 September 1998 2-5 | Sanfrecce Hiroshima | 0-0 (GG) (a.e.t.) (8-9 p) | Kashiwa Reysol | Hiroshima Big Arch |
| JST (UTC+09) |

| 19 September 1998 2-6 | Gamba Osaka | 0-2 | Sanfrecce Hiroshima | Osaka Expo '70 Stadium |
| JST (UTC+09) |

| 23 September 1998 2-7 | Sanfrecce Hiroshima | 1-2 | Yokohama Marinos | Hiroshima Big Arch |
| JST (UTC+09) |

| 26 September 1998 2-8 | Urawa Red Diamonds | 1-2 | Sanfrecce Hiroshima | Urawa Komaba Stadium |
| JST (UTC+09) |

| 3 October 1998 2-9 | Sanfrecce Hiroshima | 2-1 (GG) (a.e.t.) | Nagoya Grampus Eight | Hiroshima Big Arch |
| JST (UTC+09) |

| 14 October 1998 2-10 | Bellmare Hiratsuka | 3-0 | Sanfrecce Hiroshima | Hiratsuka Athletics Stadium |
| JST (UTC+09) |

| 17 October 1998 2-11 | Sanfrecce Hiroshima | 2-1 | Júbilo Iwata | Hiroshima Big Arch |
| JST (UTC+09) |

| 21 October 1998 2-12 | Verdy Kawasaki | 0-1 | Sanfrecce Hiroshima | Todoroki Athletics Stadium |
| JST (UTC+09) |

| 24 October 1998 2-13 | Sanfrecce Hiroshima | 2-3 | Vissel Kobe | Hiroshima Big Arch |
| JST (UTC+09) |

| 31 October 1998 2-14 | JEF United Ichihara | 0-0 (GG) (a.e.t.) (6-5 p) | Sanfrecce Hiroshima | Ichihara Seaside Stadium |
| JST (UTC+09) |

| 3 November 1998 2-15 | Sanfrecce Hiroshima | 1-2 | Yokohama Flügels | Hiroshima Big Arch |
| JST (UTC+09) |

| 7 November 1998 2-16 | Cerezo Osaka | 0-1 | Sanfrecce Hiroshima | Osaka Nagai Stadium |
| JST (UTC+09) |

| 14 November 1998 2-17 | Sanfrecce Hiroshima | 1-2 (GG) (a.e.t.) | Kyoto Purple Sanga | Hiroshima Big Arch |
| JST (UTC+09) |

=== Emperor's Cup ===
| 1st Round | bye |

| 2nd Round | bye |

| 13 December 1998 3rd Round | Sanfrecce Hiroshima | 2-1 | Kawasaki Frontale | Hiroshima Stadium |
| JST (UTC+09) |

| 20 December 1998 4th Round | Sanfrecce Hiroshima | 3-0 | Brummell Sendai | Ehime Matsuyama Athletic Stadium |
| JST (UTC+09) |

| 23 December 1998 Quarterfinals | Kashima Antlers | 2-1 (GG) (a.e.t.) | Sanfrecce Hiroshima | Sendai Stadium |
| JST (UTC+09) |

=== J.League Cup ===
| 16 May 1998 GL-A-1 | Sanfrecce Hiroshima | 1-3 | Verdy Kawasaki | Tottori Soccer Stadium |
| JST (UTC+09) |

| 23 May 1998 GL-A-2 | Brummel Sendai | 0-1 | Sanfrecce Hiroshima | Sendai Stadium |
| JST (UTC+09) |

| GL-A-3 | bye |

| 3 June 1998 GL-A-4 | Sanfrecce Hiroshima | 1-1 | Urawa Red Diamonds | Hiroshima Stadium |
| JST (UTC+09) |

| 6 June 1998 GL-A-5 | Júbilo Iwata | 3-0 | Sanfrecce Hiroshima | Júbilo Iwata Stadium |
| JST (UTC+09) |

== Player statistics ==
| No. | Pos. | Nat. | Player | D.o.B. (Age) | Height / Weight | J.League | | Emperor's Cup | | J.League Cup | | Total | |
| No. | Pos. | Nat. | Player | D.o.B. (Age) | Height / Weight | Apps | Goals | Apps | Goals | Apps | Goals | Apps | Goals |
|---|---|---|---|---|---|---|---|---|---|---|---|---|---|
| 1 | GK | (Japan) | Kazuya Maekawa | March 22, 1968 (aged 29) | cm / kg | 0 | 0 | | | | | | |
| 2 | DF | (Japan) | Hiroshi Miyazawa | November 22, 1970 (aged 27) | cm / kg | 21 | 1 | | | | | | |
| 3 | DF | (Japan) | Hiroshige Yanagimoto | October 15, 1972 (aged 25) | cm / kg | 23 | 0 | | | | | | |
| 4 | MF | (Japan) | Hiroyoshi Kuwabara | October 2, 1971 (aged 26) | cm / kg | 28 | 0 | | | | | | |
| 5 | DF | (Japan) | Tetsuya Ito | October 1, 1970 (aged 27) | cm / kg | 24 | 3 | | | | | | |
| 6 | DF | (Japan) | Mitsuaki Kojima | July 14, 1968 (aged 29) | cm / kg | 24 | 0 | | | | | | |
| 7 | MF | (England) | Ian Crook | January 18, 1963 (aged 35) | cm / kg | 9 | 1 | | | | | | |
| 7 | MF | (Australia) | Aurelio Vidmar | February 3, 1967 (aged 31) | cm / kg | 15 | 4 | | | | | | |
| 8 | MF | (Japan) | Yasuhiro Yoshida | July 14, 1969 (aged 28) | cm / kg | 32 | 2 | | | | | | |
| 9 | FW | (Australia) | Graham Arnold | August 3, 1963 (aged 34) | cm / kg | 10 | 1 | | | | | | |
| 9 | FW | (England) | Don Goodman | May 9, 1966 (aged 31) | cm / kg | 10 | 2 | | | | | | |
| 10 | FW | (Japan) | Tatsuhiko Kubo | June 18, 1976 (aged 21) | cm / kg | 32 | 12 | | | | | | |
| 11 | FW | (Japan) | Masato Fue | March 22, 1973 (aged 24) | cm / kg | 1 | 0 | | | | | | |
| 12 | FW | (Japan) | Susumu Oki | February 23, 1976 (aged 22) | cm / kg | 20 | 4 | | | | | | |
| 13 | MF | (Japan) | Satoshi Koga | February 12, 1970 (aged 28) | cm / kg | 13 | 0 | | | | | | |
| 14 | MF | (Japan) | Katsuhiro Minamoto | July 2, 1972 (aged 25) | cm / kg | 26 | 1 | | | | | | |
| 15 | MF | (Japan) | Iwao Yamane | July 31, 1976 (aged 21) | cm / kg | 11 | 0 | | | | | | |
| 16 | GK | (Japan) | Takashi Shimoda | November 28, 1975 (aged 22) | cm / kg | 34 | 0 | | | | | | |
| 17 | MF | (Japan) | Kota Hattori | November 22, 1977 (aged 20) | cm / kg | 32 | 1 | | | | | | |
| 18 | DF | (Australia) | Tony Popovic | July 4, 1973 (aged 24) | cm / kg | 25 | 4 | | | | | | |
| 19 | DF | (Japan) | Kenichi Uemura | April 22, 1974 (aged 23) | cm / kg | 17 | 0 | | | | | | |
| 20 | MF | (Japan) | Keita Kanemoto | July 13, 1977 (aged 20) | cm / kg | 3 | 0 | | | | | | |
| 21 | MF | (Japan) | Makoto Okubo | May 3, 1975 (aged 22) | cm / kg | 6 | 1 | | | | | | |
| 22 | GK | (Japan) | Tetsuharu Yamaguchi | September 8, 1977 (aged 20) | cm / kg | 0 | 0 | | | | | | |
| 23 | FW | (Japan) | Kazuyoshi Matsunaga | November 13, 1977 (aged 20) | cm / kg | 8 | 1 | | | | | | |
| 24 | MF | (Japan) | Yuji Ishikawa | July 2, 1979 (aged 18) | cm / kg | 0 | 0 | | | | | | |
| 25 | DF | (Japan) | Shinya Kawashima | July 20, 1978 (aged 19) | cm / kg | 3 | 0 | | | | | | |
| 26 | FW | (Japan) | Hisashi Hiroike | October 5, 1978 (aged 19) | cm / kg | 0 | 0 | | | | | | |
| 27 | DF | (Japan) | Yosuke Ikehata | June 7, 1979 (aged 18) | cm / kg | 4 | 0 | | | | | | |
| 28 | FW | (Japan) | Yuya Matsuoka | June 15, 1978 (aged 19) | cm / kg | 0 | 0 | | | | | | |
| 29 | FW | (Japan) | Takahisa Iwamura | May 11, 1978 (aged 19) | cm / kg | 0 | 0 | | | | | | |
| 29 | MF | (Japan) | Atsushi Nagai | December 23, 1974 (aged 23) | cm / kg | 0 | 0 | | | | | | |
| 30 | DF | (Japan) | Toru Yasutake | December 10, 1978 (aged 19) | cm / kg | 0 | 0 | | | | | | |
| 31 | GK | (Japan) | Motoki Ueda | May 14, 1979 (aged 18) | cm / kg | 0 | 0 | | | | | | |
| 32 | MF | (Japan) | Junya Ohata | April 6, 1979 (aged 18) | cm / kg | 0 | 0 | | | | | | |
| 33 | MF | (Japan) | Ryoji Yukutomo | April 20, 1979 (aged 18) | cm / kg | 0 | 0 | | | | | | |
| 34 | FW | (Japan) | Masahiro Akimoto | April 15, 1979 (aged 18) | cm / kg | 1 | 0 | | | | | | |
| 35 | DF | (Japan) | Kazuya Yamashita | April 2, 1979 (aged 18) | cm / kg | 0 | 0 | | | | | | |
| 36 | GK | (Japan) | Takaya Oishi | July 7, 1972 (aged 25) | cm / kg | 0 | 0 | | | | | | |
| 37 | MF | (Japan) | Toshihiro Yamaguchi | November 19, 1971 (aged 26) | cm / kg | 17 | 2 | | | | | | |
| 38 | DF | (Australia) | Hayden Foxe | June 23, 1977 (aged 20) | cm / kg | 15 | 3 | | | | | | |

== Other pages ==
- (in Japanese) J.League official site
