= Hayden Foxe =

Australian footballer

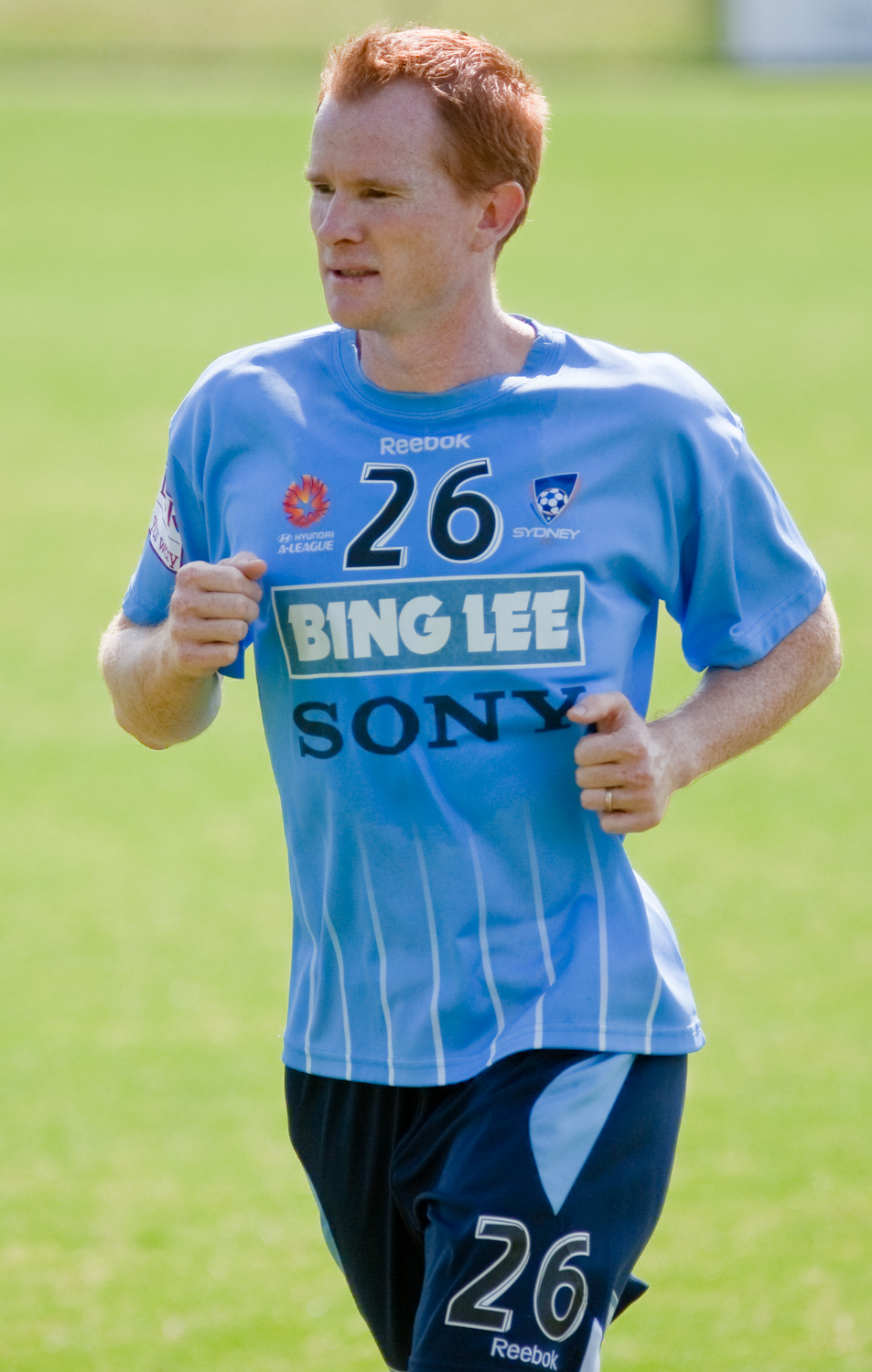
- Foxe training with Sydney FC in 2010

Personal information
- Full name: Hayden Vernon Foxe
- Date of birth: 23 June 1977 (age 49)
- Place of birth: Sydney, Australia
- Height: 1.85 m (6 ft 1 in)
- Position: Centre-back

Team information
- Current team: Australia (assistant)

Youth career
- Blacktown City Demons
- 1994–1995: AIS
- 1995–1997: Ajax

Senior career*
| Years | Team | Apps | (Gls) |
| 1997–1998 | Arminia Bielefeld | 1 | (0) |
| 1998–2000 | Sanfrecce Hiroshima | 37 | (5) |
| 2000–2002 | West Ham United | 12 | (0) |
| 2000–2001 | → KV Mechelen (loan) | 4 | (0) |
| 2002–2005 | Portsmouth | 46 | (2) |
| 2006–2007 | Leeds United | 21 | (1) |
| 2007–2009 | Perth Glory | 8 | (0) |
| 2010–2011 | Sydney FC | 25 | (0) |
| Total | | 154 | (3) |

International career
| 1993 | Australia U17 | 2 | (0) |
| 1997 | Australia U20 | 4 | (0) |
| 1996–2000 | Australia U23 | 9 | (1) |
| 1998–2003 | Australia | 11 | (2) |

Managerial career
- 2012–2013: Melbourne Heart (youth)
- 2013: Melbourne Heart (assistant)
- 2015–2017: Western Sydney Wanderers (assistant)
- 2017: Western Sydney Wanderers (caretaker)
- 2018–2020: Perth Glory (assistant)
- 2020: Perth Glory (caretaker)
- 2021–2024: Western United (assistant)
- 2024–: Australia (assistant)
Medal record
Men's association football
Representing Australia
FIFA Confederations Cup
| Third place | 2001 Japan–South Korea |
- * Club domestic league appearances and goals

Hayden Vernon Foxe (born 23 June 1977) is an Australian former professional soccer player who works as assistant coach with the Australia men's national soccer team. He played football as a centre-back at the top level in Germany, Japan, Belgium, England and Australia. Foxe represented his country at international level 11 times between 1998 and 2003.

== Club career ==
=== Europe ===
Beginning his career at Sydney club Blacktown City he moved to Dutch club Ajax Amsterdam where he played from 1995–97. Foxe soon established a reputation as a talented young defender, earning a move to J1 League club Sanfrecce Hiroshima in 1998–99.

Becoming an important player both at club and international level, Foxe represented his country at the 1996 Summer Olympics and 2000 Summer Olympics. He impressed enough to earn a move to England's West Ham United for the 2000–01 season. He was then immediately loaned to Belgian club Mechelen in order to build up his match fitness. Foxe returned to West Ham United in March, but struggled in the Premiership, losing his place when then manager Harry Redknapp left the club later that year.

After playing only 12 games for West Ham, he moved to Portsmouth (then managed by Harry Redknapp) for £400,000 in May 2002. Foxe was an important player as Portsmouth won the 2002–03 First Division title, and in doing so were promoted to the Premiership. He was a regular in Portsmouth's side until a fractured bone in his foot ended his campaign at Christmas. He spent the rest of that season, as well as the 2004–05 season, rehabilitating.

New manager Alain Perrin elected not to renew his contract when it expired in June 2005, and he was released. Foxe returned to Australia to undergo an operation in an attempt to resolve his ongoing injury problems. Foxe trained with Leeds United during their 2006 pre-season campaign and signed a five-month permanent contract with the Yorkshire club on 11 August 2006.

Foxe attempted to rebuild his career at Leeds and since the departure of Kevin Blackwell, both care-taker manager John Carver and new manager Dennis Wise provided the Aussie with chances to perform. Foxe however only ultimately played a bit part in the 2006–07 season and was released at the end of the season when Leeds United were relegated to English League One. He scored one league goal during his time at Leeds, against Luton in a 5–1 defeat.

=== Perth Glory ===
In 2007, he returned to Australia to play for Perth Glory in the A-League and missed the first half of the season due to a knee injury but returned later in the season to play the last six games of the 2007–08 season. After finishing the 2008–09 season with Glory, he has been released.

=== Sydney FC ===
On 7 January 2010, he was announced to have made a comeback to the A-League on a short-term injury replacement deal with Sydney FC. After his short term contract, he signed a one-year extension with Vítězslav Lavička noting how his presence late in the season was a crucial factor in Sydney's end of season success, which will keep him at the club until the end of the 2010–11 A-League season. He was the vice captain.

Foxe announced his retirement from football at the end of the 2010–11 A-League season, deciding not to continue with Sydney FC for their Asian Champions League campaign, despite keen interest from coach Lavička for his services.

== International career ==
=== Youth ===
Foxe played 1993 World Youth Championship Finals in Japan with the Australia U17 national team and at the 1997 FIFA World Youth Championship in Malaysia with the U20 national team.

With the Australia U23 national team he participated in qualification for the 1996 Summer Olympics and he was a member of the squad at the 1996 Summer Olympics in Atlanta and 2000 Summer Olympics in Sydney.

=== Senior ===
Foxe was capped by the Australia national team.

== Personal life ==
He is the brother of Jeremy Foxe & Damien Foxe, who also played football.

== Career statistics ==
=== Club ===
Appearances and goals by club, season and competition
| Club | Season | League | | | National Cup | | League Cup | | Continental | | Total | |
| Club | Season | Division | Apps | Goals | Apps | Goals | Apps | Goals | Apps | Goals | Apps | Goals |
|---|---|---|---|---|---|---|---|---|---|---|---|---|
| Arminia Bielefeld | 1997–98 | Bundesliga | 1 | 0 | 0 | 0 | 0 | 0 | – | | 1 | 0 |
| Sanfrecce Hiroshima | 1998 | J1 League | 15 | 3 | 1 | 0 | 0 | 0 | – | | 16 | 3 |
| Sanfrecce Hiroshima | 1999 | J1 League | 22 | 2 | 5 | 3 | 2 | 0 | – | | 29 | 5 |
| Sanfrecce Hiroshima | 2000 | J1 League | 0 | 0 | 0 | 0 | 0 | 0 | – | | 0 | 0 |
| Sanfrecce Hiroshima | Total | | 37 | 5 | 6 | 3 | 2 | 0 | 0 | 0 | 45 | 8 |
| KV Mechelen | 2000–01 | First Division | 4 | 0 | | | | | | | 4 | 0 |
| West Ham United | 2000–01 | Premier League | 5 | 0 | 0 | 0 | 0 | 0 | 0 | 0 | 5 | 0 |
| West Ham United | 2001–02 | Premier League | 6 | 0 | 1 | 0 | 0 | 0 | 0 | 0 | 7 | 0 |
| West Ham United | Total | | 11 | 0 | 1 | 0 | 0 | 0 | 0 | 0 | 12 | 0 |
| Portsmouth | 2002–03 | First Division | 32 | 1 | 1 | 0 | 0 | 0 | – | | 33 | 1 |
| Portsmouth | 2003–04 | Premier League | 10 | 1 | 0 | 0 | 3 | 0 | – | | 13 | 1 |
| Portsmouth | 2004–05 | Premier League | 0 | 0 | 0 | 0 | 0 | 0 | 0 | 0 | 0 | 0 |
| Portsmouth | 2005–06 | Premier League | 0 | 0 | 0 | 0 | 0 | 0 | 0 | 0 | 0 | 0 |
| Portsmouth | Total | | 42 | 2 | 1 | 0 | 3 | 0 | 0 | 0 | 46 | 2 |
| Leeds United | 2006–07 | Championship | 18 | 1 | 1 | 0 | 2 | 0 | – | | 21 | 1 |
| Perth Glory | 2007–08 | A-League | 6 | 0 | – | | – | | – | | 6 | 0 |
| Perth Glory | 2008–09 | A-League | 2 | 0 | – | | – | | – | | 2 | 0 |
| Perth Glory | Total | | 8 | 0 | 0 | 0 | 0 | 0 | 0 | 0 | 8 | 0 |
| Sydney FC | 2009–10 | A-League | 10 | 0 | – | | – | | – | | 10 | 0 |
| Career total | | | 121 | 8 | 9 | 3 | 7 | 0 | 0 | 0 | 137 | 11 |

=== International ===
Appearances and goals by national team and year
| National team | Year | Apps | Goals |
|---|---|---|---|
| Australia | 1998 | 1 | 0 |
| Australia | 1999 | 0 | 0 |
| Australia | 2000 | 4 | 0 |
| Australia | 2001 | 5 | 2 |
| Australia | 2002 | 0 | 0 |
| Australia | 2003 | 1 | 0 |
| Total | | 11 | 2 |

== Managerial statistics ==
As of November 2017

| Team | Nat | From | To | Record | | | | |
| Team | Nat | From | To | G | W | D | L | Win % |
|---|---|---|---|---|---|---|---|---|
| Western Sydney Wanderers (caretaker) | (Australia) | 3 October 2017 | 6 November 2017 | 5 | 1 | 4 | 0 | 20.00 |
| Total | | | | 5 | 1 | 4 | 0 | 20.00 |

== Honours ==
Portsmouth

- Football League First Division: 2002–03

Sydney FC

- A-League Premiership: 2009–10
- A-League Championship: 2009–10

Australia

- FIFA Confederations Cup third place: 2001
