= Yuji Ishikawa =

Japanese footballer

Yuji Ishikawa 石川 裕司
Personal information
- Full name: Yuji Ishikawa
- Date of birth: July 2, 1979 (age 47)
- Place of birth: Masuda, Shimane, Japan
- Height: 1.81 m (5 ft 11 1/2 in)
- Position: Defender

Youth career
- 1995–1997: Sanfrecce Hiroshima

Senior career*
Years	Team	Apps	(Gls)
1998–2000	Sanfrecce Hiroshima	0	(0)
2001–2008	Tokushima Vortis	128	(11)
Total		128	(11)
Medal record
Sanfrecce Hiroshima
Runner-up	Emperor's Cup	1999
- * Club domestic league appearances and goals

Yuji Ishikawa (石川 裕司, Ishikawa Yūji; born July 2, 1979) is a former Japanese football player.

== Playing career ==
Ishikawa was born in Masuda on July 2, 1979. He joined the J1 League club Sanfrecce Hiroshima as part of the youth team in 1998. However he did not play in any matches. In 2001, he moved to the Japan Football League club Otsuka Pharmaceutical (later Tokushima Vortis). He became a regular player as center back. The club won the championship two years in a row (2003-2004) and was promoted to the J2 League in 2005. Starting in 2005, he did not play as often, due to injury, and he retired at the end of the 2008 season.

== Career statistics ==
Appearances and goals by club, season and competition
Club	Season	League			Emperor's Cup		J.League Cup		Total	
Club	Season	Division	Apps	Goals	Apps	Goals	Apps	Goals	Apps	Goals
Sanfrecce Hiroshima	1998	J1 League	0	0	0	0	0	0	0	0
Sanfrecce Hiroshima	1999	J1 League	0	0	0	0	0	0	0	0
Sanfrecce Hiroshima	2000	J1 League	0	0	0	0	0	0	0	0
Otsuka Pharmaceutical	2001	Football League	28	2	3	0	—		31	2
Otsuka Pharmaceutical	2002	Football League	8	1	2	0	—		10	1
Otsuka Pharmaceutical	2003	Football League	28	4	2	0	—		30	4
Otsuka Pharmaceutical	2004	Football League	27	3	1	0	—		28	3
Tokushima Vortis	2005	J2 League	14	1	2	0	—		16	1
Tokushima Vortis	2006	J2 League	7	0	0	0	—		7	0
Tokushima Vortis	2007	J2 League	16	0	1	0	—		17	0
Tokushima Vortis	2008	J2 League	0	0	0	0	—		0	0
Career total			128	11	11	0	0	0	139	11
