= 2010 Sanfrecce Hiroshima season =

Sanfrecce Hiroshima
2010 season
- Manager: Mihailo Petrović
- Stadium: Hiroshima Big Arch
- J. League 1: 7th
- Emperor's Cup: 3rd Round
- J. League Cup: Runners-up
- Top goalscorer: Tadanari Lee (11)

2010 Sanfrecce Hiroshima season

== Competitions ==
Competitions	Position
J. League 1	7th / 18 clubs
Emperor's Cup	3rd Round
J. League Cup	Runners-up

=== J. League 1 ===
Pos	Team	Pld	W	D	L	GF	GA	GD	Pts
5	Kawasaki Frontale	34	15	9	10	61	47	+14	54
6	Shimizu S-Pulse	34	15	9	10	60	49	+11	54
7	Sanfrecce Hiroshima	34	14	9	11	45	38	+7	51
8	Yokohama F. Marinos	34	15	6	13	43	39	+4	51
9	Albirex Niigata	34	12	13	9	48	45	+3	49

Updated to match(es) played on December 4, 2010. Source: J.League Division 1
Rules for classification: 1) points; 2) goal difference; 3) number of goals scored.

== Player statistics ==
No.	Pos.	Player	D.o.B. (Age)	Height / Weight	J. League 1		Emperor's Cup		J. League Cup		Total	
No.	Pos.	Player	D.o.B. (Age)	Height / Weight	Apps	Goals	Apps	Goals	Apps	Goals	Apps	Goals
1	GK	Takashi Shimoda	November 28, 1975 (aged 34)	cm / kg	0	0						
2	DF	Ilian Stoyanov	January 20, 1977 (aged 33)	cm / kg	17	0						
5	DF	Tomoaki Makino	May 11, 1987 (aged 22)	cm / kg	34	4						
6	MF	Toshihiro Aoyama	February 22, 1986 (aged 24)	cm / kg	23	0						
7	MF	Kōji Morisaki	May 9, 1981 (aged 28)	cm / kg	27	3						
8	MF	Kazuyuki Morisaki	May 9, 1981 (aged 28)	cm / kg	17	0						
9	FW	Tadanari Lee	December 19, 1985 (aged 24)	cm / kg	30	11						
11	FW	Hisato Satō	March 12, 1982 (aged 27)	cm / kg	27	10						
13	MF	Issei Takayanagi	September 14, 1986 (aged 23)	cm / kg	17	0						
14	MF	Mihael Mikić	January 6, 1980 (aged 30)	cm / kg	16	1						
15	MF	Yojiro Takahagi	August 2, 1986 (aged 23)	cm / kg	22	4						
16	MF	Satoru Yamagishi	May 3, 1983 (aged 26)	cm / kg	24	3						
17	MF	Kota Hattori	November 22, 1977 (aged 32)	cm / kg	25	1						
19	DF	Kohei Morita	July 13, 1976 (aged 33)	cm / kg	0	0						
20	MF	Shinichiro Kuwada	December 6, 1986 (aged 23)	cm / kg	12	0						
21	GK	Shusaku Nishikawa	June 18, 1986 (aged 23)	cm / kg	34	0						
22	MF	Tsubasa Yokotake	August 30, 1989 (aged 20)	cm / kg	27	0						
23	MF	Hironori Ishikawa	January 6, 1988 (aged 22)	cm / kg	1	0						
24	DF	Ryota Moriwaki	April 6, 1986 (aged 23)	cm / kg	31	0						
25	FW	Junya Osaki	April 2, 1991 (aged 18)	cm / kg	9	2						
27	FW	Kohei Shimizu	April 30, 1989 (aged 20)	cm / kg	4	0						
28	FW	Takuya Marutani	May 30, 1989 (aged 20)	cm / kg	16	0						
30	MF	Sho Shinohara	August 11, 1989 (aged 20)	cm / kg	0	0						
32	MF	Tomotaka Okamoto	June 29, 1990 (aged 19)	cm / kg	0	0						
33	FW	Masato Yamazaki	December 4, 1981 (aged 28)	cm / kg	25	3						
34	GK	Hirotsugu Nakabayashi	April 28, 1986 (aged 23)	cm / kg	0	0						
35	MF	Koji Nakajima	August 20, 1977 (aged 32)	cm / kg	32	2						
36	GK	Yutaro Hara	April 23, 1990 (aged 19)	cm / kg	0	0						

== Other pages ==
- (in Japanese) J. League official site
