= Danny Hay =

New Zealand footballer (born 1975)

Personal information
- Full name: Daniel John Hay
- Date of birth: 15 May 1975 (age 51)
- Place of birth: Auckland, New Zealand
- Height: 1.91 m (6 ft 3 in)
- Position: Centre back

Team information
- Current team: Auckland FC (assistant manager)

Youth career
- Green Bay-Titirangi

Senior career*
Years	Team	Apps	(Gls)
1995	Waitakere City		
1996–1998	Central United		
1998–1999	Perth Glory	48	(2)
1999–2002	Leeds United	4	(0)
2002–2003	Walsall	45	(0)
2003–2004	Football Kingz	7	(1)
2005	New Zealand Knights	9	(0)
2005–2006	Perth Glory	4	(0)
2006–2009	Waitakere United	33	(5)

International career^{‡}
1996–2007	New Zealand	31	(2)

Managerial career
- 2015–2017: New Zealand U-17
- 2017–2019: Eastern Suburbs
- 2019–2022: New Zealand
- 2020–2022: New Zealand U-23
- 2020: New Zealand U-20 (interim)
- 2023–2024: Perth
- 2024–: Auckland FC (assistant)
Medal record
Representing New Zealand
Men's Association football
OFC Nations Cup
Winner	1998 Australia
- * Club domestic league appearances and goals as of 30 October 2019 ‡ National team caps and goals as of 26 August 2019

Daniel John Hay (born 15 May 1975) is a retired New Zealand professional footballer who formerly managed the New Zealand men's national football team, New Zealand U-23, and New Zealand U-20. Hay played as a central defender for Premier League club Leeds United and National Soccer League side, Perth Glory. He also captained Waitakere United in the New Zealand Football Championship.

== Early and personal life ==
Hay was born in Auckland and grew up in Titirangi and later Hillsborough. He attended Kelston Boys High School where he played in the 1st XI for four years between 1990 and 1993.

== High school career ==
=== Kelston Boys High School ===
Hay played for his school's first XI. Hay was awarded the Auckland College Sportsperson of the Year (Football) for 1993.

== Club career ==
=== Waitakere City ===
Hay played for Waitakere City in 1994 and was named in the starting line up as an injury replacement for Rodger Gray in the Chatham Cup final against Wellington Olympic which was won 1–0. Hay was also a member of the successful Waitakere City team that ended up winning the 1995 New Zealand Superclub League competition beating Waikato United 4–0 in the final. Waitakere repeated their Chatham Cup success beating North Shore United in the 1995 final 4–0.

=== Central United ===
Hay moved to Central United for the National Summer League which commenced in January 1996. On 30 March he captained the side to their away win over Waitakere City 2–0 and contributed with a penalty goal.

=== Perth Glory ===
In August 1997, Hay signed for Perth Glory in only their second season in the Australian National Soccer League. Hay scored a goal in their 4–1 win over eventual season championship winners South Melbourne at Perth Oval on 7 December 1997. Perth Glory finished eighth in the table at the end of the season. Hay was awarded the prestigious Perth Glory Most Glorious Player award.

The following season proved to be more successful for Perth Glory, finishing third, after losing the preliminary final to Sydney United at Sydney on 23 May 1999. Hay was awarded again the prestigious Perth Glory Most Glorious Player award this time jointly with Scott Miller.

=== Leeds United ===
In June 1999, Hay trialled for Bundesliga side VfB Stuttgart before trialling the following month for Premier League side, Leeds United on the first team's pre season tour of Sweden and Finland. On 14 July 1999, Hay started in their friendly match against Swedish side Byske. On 17 July 1999, he started again and played the full fixture against Finnish side Tervaritahdet in Oulu. Hay was rested for the final match against Swedish side Bodens. Due to trial commitments, Hay was unavailable for international duties at the Confederations Cup in Mexico.

Hay was successful in obtaining a three-year contract with Leeds and became the first New Zealander to be offered a contract by a Premier League club. Hay was initially included in Leeds' Reserve squad for the 1999–2000 Premier Reserve League season where he started in the majority of the 24 fixtures between August 1999 and May 2000.

Hay's time at Leeds was marked by injuries and all his appearances for the club's first team featured in less than a two-month period from when he debuted for the team in the UEFA Champions League. His time with the team was mainly on the bench when the team itself was ravaged by injuries.

On 30 September 1999, Hay was named on the bench for Leeds' second leg UEFA Cup first round fixture against Partizan Belgrade at Elland Road.

==== UEFA Champions League ====
On 13 September 2000, Hay was named on the bench for their UEFA Champions League first group stage fixture against Barcelona at the Nou Camp. Hay came on in the 89th minute as a substitute for captain Lucas Radebe who suffered what appeared to be a serious neck injury.

After making an appearance in the game against Barcelona, Hay was named on the bench but didn't see the field again for Leeds in games against AC Milan, Beşiktaş twice and the home fixture against Barcelona

On 8 November 2000, Hay was again a substitute for the return leg away fixture against AC Milan which was drawn 1–1. The point gained, qualified Leeds to join group leaders AC Milan through to the last 16 of the Champions League.

A hernia operation curtailed Hay's further involvement until he made a return for the Reserves team against Liverpool in January 2001. On 14 March 2001, Hay returned to the bench for the first team for the return leg fixture against Lazio at home which was drawn 3–3 and advanced Leeds into the quarter-final stage.

==== Premier League ====
On 30 September 2000, Hay made his first appearance when he came on as a 45th-minute substitute for Lucas Radebe in Leeds United's 4–3 win over Tottenham Hotspur at Elland Road. Hay became only the second New Zealander after Lee Norfolk to appear in England's top division.

On 21 October 2000, Hay started in Leeds United's away fixture against Manchester United at Old Trafford which was lost 3–0. The following week Hay started in their fixture against Bradford City at Valley Parade where his headed attempt on goal was cleared from the line by Bradford defender Ian Nolan in the 12th minute. On 4 November 2000, Hay came on as a 16th-minute substitute for Jonathan Woodgate against Liverpool in a memorable 4–3 victory for Leeds.

==== Football League Cup ====
On 31 October 2000, Hay started for Leeds in their third round fixture in the Worthington Cup against Tranmere Rovers at Prenton Park which was lost 3–2 after extra time.

Hay had surgery in the summer and returned for pre-season fixtures in August. On 8 August 2001, he started in the pre-season away fixture against York City which was won 4–0. On 13 August 2001, he started in the pre-season away fixture against Harrowgate Town which was won by Leeds 3–0. On 22 August 2001, Hay started in the away fixture against Selby Town but he aggravated a groin injury and needed further treatment. Hay still had injury worries later in the season precluding him from Leeds' first leg third round UEFA Cup away fixture against Grasshoppers on 22 November 2001. Hay made no further first team or reserve squad appearances in the season due to injury.

=== Walsall ===
Hay was released at the end of his Leeds United contract in May 2002 and later signed for Walsall in July 2002 who were playing Football League First Division in England. Hay became a regular starter for the team, having forty starts and five games off the bench for Walsall.

=== Football Kingz ===
Hay signed on with the Football Kingz in what turned out to be the club's last season. Hay joined the squad in the early part of 2004, making seven appearances. Hay played and scored in his last match in a 4–3 win against Brisbane Strikers FC on 29 February 2004.

=== New Zealand Knights ===
Hay started the 2005–2006 season as inaugural captain for the Auckland-based New Zealand Knights, but left the club in December 2005, following a falling out with management.

=== Perth Glory ===
Hay swapped clubs during the 2005–06 A-League season to rivals Perth Glory, joining his former club in January 2006 after an SOS to help them out due to injuries.

=== Waitakere United ===
Hay then returned to New Zealand to see out the rest of his playing career with Waitakere United who played in the New Zealand Football Championship. Hay was captain of the team during the 2006–07 season where they were runners up to Auckland City in the grand final. Hay continued as captained the next season, helping lead the team to their maiden title with a win over Team Wellington in the 2007–08 season grand final. The 2008–09 season, Waitakere again where runners up to Auckland City losing in a dramatic grand final 2–1.

== International career ==
Hay played in the New Zealand national team, making 31 appearances for the team and scoring two goals. Hay made his New Zealand debut against Oman on 29 September 1996 during New Zealand's tour of Oman, Saudi Arabia, Qatar and Lebanon. His first goal for his country came against Fiji in the 1998 Oceania Nations Cup in a 1–0 win. In 2006, Hay was awarded the captaincy of the New Zealand team.

=== 2003 FIFA Confederation Cup – France ===
After not playing any international football for four years, Hay was named in the New Zealand squad who were grouped with France, Colombia and Japan in Group A. Hay was recovering from an ankle injury which had ended his season in mid February while at Walsall FC.

On 18 June 2003, Hay was an unused substitute in the All Whites opening match against Japan at Saint-Denis which was lost 3–0. On 20 June 2003, Hay started in New Zealand's next match against Colombia at Lyon which was lost 3–1. On 22 June 2003, Hay played in the team's final fixture against a French side at Saint-Denis which the New Zealanders lost 5–0.

At the start of 2009, Hay retired from international football to pursue a teaching career at Sacred Heart College in Auckland. While teaching at the school, he was also involved with coaching the First XI and youth development teams.

== Managerial career ==
=== Sacred Heart College ===
Hay was head coach of the 1st XI at Sacred Heart College. Hay lead Sacred Heart to win the Lotto Premier National Secondary Schools Championship for the years 2011, 2014 and 2016. In 2015, they were runners up to Nelson College 2–1 in the final. and to Hamilton Boys High in the 2017 final.

In May 2017, Hay lead the team to attend the International School Sport Federation's World Schools Championship in Prague.

=== Eastern Suburbs ===
Hay coached at Eastern Suburbs team in the ISPS Handa Premiership, leading the team to their first national title in 48 years when they won the Championship in 2019.

=== New Zealand under-17 ===
Hay was appointed as coach of the New Zealand under-17 national team in April 2015. He was manager of the U17s at the 2015 FIFA U-17 World Cup where they lost to Brazil in the round of 16 due to a 96th-minute penalty having qualified from the group in second-place behind France. They started the tournament with a 6–1 lost to France before following it up with a 0–0 draw against Syria and a 2–1 win against Paraguay in group play.

In February 2017, the team won the 2017 OFC U-17 Championship with a 7–0 win over New Caledonia in the final, it was the biggest win over New Caledonia at this age group and also qualified the team for the 2017 FIFA U-17 World Cup. They went through the tournament undefeated, finishing top of their group while scoring 27 goals and only conceding one in the semi-final win over Papua New Guinea. It was also the New Zealand under-17 teams sixth consecutive OFC U-17 Championship and seventh overall.

=== New Zealand national team ===
On 26 August 2019, Hay was announced as the new coach of New Zealand, becoming only the second person to both captain and manage the team. In Hay's first game in charge, New Zealand lost 3–1 playing a friendly against the Republic of Ireland.

== Controversy ==
Hay, then a teacher and coach at Sacred Heart College, Auckland, courted controversy in June 2012 by criticising New Zealand coach Ricki Herbert's tactics following a third-place finish in the 2012 OFC Nations Cup. Hay was quoted as saying "It's a little bit scary that you've got one person dictating all the ideas and there's nothing fresh coming through. He's got tactically lazy and to play three at the back in Honiara was horrific in those conditions, with the type of players we had available to us."

Also while coaching at Sacred Heart, Hay was banned for four games after a sideline outburst at match officials, calling the referee and the assistant referee "f***ing cheats". Hay later stated that he regretted his actions and apologised to his players and parents of young children, who might have heard his outburst.

== Career statistics ==
=== Club ===
Appearances and goals by club, season and competition
Club	Season	League			FA Cup		League Cup		Other		Total	
Club	Season	Division	Apps	Goals	Apps	Goals	Apps	Goals	Apps	Goals	Apps	Goals
Perth Glory	1998–99	National Soccer League			—		—		—			
Leeds United	1999–2000	Premier League										
Leeds United	2000–01	Premier League										
Leeds United	2001–02	Premier League										
Leeds United	Total											
Walsall	2002–03	First Division										
Football Kingz	2003–04	National Soccer League	7	1	—		—		—		7	1
New Zealand Knights	2005–06	A-League	9	0	—		—		—		9	0
Perth Glory	2005–06	A-League	4	0	—		—		—		4	0
Waitakere United	2006–07	Premiership	13	1	—		—		3 (Note: Two appearances and one goal in OFC Champions League; one appearance in New Zealand Football Championship play-offs)	1	16	2
Waitakere United	2007–08	Premiership	16	2	—		—		7 (Note: Five appearances in OFC Champions League; one appearance in New Zealand Football Championship play-offs; one appearances in FIFA Club World Cup)	0	23	2
Waitakere United	2008–09	Premiership	3	0	—		—		6 (Note: Three appearances in OFC Champions League; three appearance in New Zealand Football Championship play-offs)	0	9	0
Waitakere United	Total											
Career total												

=== International ===
Appearances and goals by national team and year
National team	Year	Apps	Goals
New Zealand	1996	3	0
New Zealand	1997	7	0
New Zealand	1998	6	1
New Zealand	2002	1	0
New Zealand	2003	3	0
New Zealand	2005	1	0
New Zealand	2006	8	1
New Zealand	2007	2	0
Total		31	2

Scores and results list New Zealand's goal tally first, score column indicates score after each Hay goal.

List of international goals scored by Danny Hay
No.	Date	Venue	Opponent	Score	Result	Competition	Ref.
1	2 October 1998	Lang Park, Brisbane, Australia	Fiji	1–0	1–0	1998 OFC Nations Cup	
2	31 May 2006	Lilleküla Stadium, Tallinn, Estonia	Estonia	1–1	1–1	Friendly	

== Honours ==
New Zealand

- OFC Nations Cup: 1998

Awards
Preceded by Gavin Wilkinson	Perth Glory Most Glorious Player Award; 1997/98	Succeeded by Danny Hay, Scott Miller
