= Takashi Shimoda =

Japanese footballer

Takashi Shimoda 下田 崇
Personal information
- Full name: Takashi Shimoda
- Date of birth: 28 November 1975 (age 50)
- Place of birth: Hiroshima, Japan
- Height: 1.83 m (6 ft 0 in)
- Position: Goalkeeper

Team information
- Current team: Japan (goalkeeping coach)

Youth career
- 1991–1993: Hiroshima Minami High School

Senior career*
Years	Team	Apps	(Gls)
1994–2010	Sanfrecce Hiroshima	331	(0)
Total		331	(0)

International career
1995	Japan U20	2	(0)
1999	Japan	1	(0)

Managerial career
- 2011–2018: Sanfrecce Hiroshima (goalkeeping coach)
- 2018–: Japan (goalkeeping coach)
Medal record
Representing Japan
AFC Asian Cup
Gold medal – first place	2000 Lebanon
- * Club domestic league appearances and goals

Takashi Shimoda (下田 崇, Shimoda Takashi; born 28 November 1975) is a Japanese former professional footballer who played as a goalkeeper. He currently works as the goalkeeping coach for the Japan national team.

== Club career ==
Shimoda was born in Hiroshima on 28 November 1975. After graduating from high school, he joined Sanfrecce Hiroshima in 1994. He did not play many matches until the mid 1990s, as he was behind Kazuya Maekawa and Kazumasa Kawano. Kawano left the club in 1997 and Maekawa was injured in 1998; Shimoda then became a regular goalkeeper in 1998. Although he played as the regular goalkeeper until 2007, he sustained a knee injury that same year. He did not play from 2008 and retired at the end of the 2010 season.

== International career ==
In April 1995, Shimoda was selected to the Japan under-20 national team for the 1995 World Youth Championship. He played two matches including the quarter-final. In July 1996, he was also selected to the Japan under-23s for the 1996 Summer Olympics. However, he did not play in any matches behind Yoshikatsu Kawaguchi. Although Japan won two matches, Japan exited in the first round. At this time, Japan beat Brazil in the first game. It was known as the "Miracle of Miami" (マイアミの奇跡) in Japan.

On 31 March 1999, Shimoda debuted for the Japan national team against Brazil. He was also selected by Japan for the 2000 Asian Cup. Although he did not play in any matches, Japan won the tournament.

== Career statistics ==
=== Club ===
Appearances and goals by club, season and competition
Club	Season	League			Emperor's Cup		J.League Cup		Continental		Total	
Club	Season	Division	Apps	Goals	Apps	Goals	Apps	Goals	Apps	Goals	Apps	Goals
Sanfrecce Hiroshima	1994	J1 League	0	0	0	0	0	0	—		0	0
Sanfrecce Hiroshima	1995	J1 League	5	0	0	0	—		—		5	0
Sanfrecce Hiroshima	1996	J1 League	1	0	0	0	0	0	—		1	0
Sanfrecce Hiroshima	1997	J1 League	9	0	2	0	0	0	—		11	0
Sanfrecce Hiroshima	1998	J1 League	34	0	3	0	4	0	—		41	0
Sanfrecce Hiroshima	1999	J1 League	30	0	5	0	2	0	—		37	0
Sanfrecce Hiroshima	2000	J1 League	30	0	2	0	4	0	—		36	0
Sanfrecce Hiroshima	2001	J1 League	29	0	2	0	6	0	—		37	0
Sanfrecce Hiroshima	2002	J1 League	29	0	0	0	6	0	—		35	0
Sanfrecce Hiroshima	2003	J2 League	43	0	4	0	—		—		47	0
Sanfrecce Hiroshima	2004	J1 League	30	0	1	0	5	0	—		36	0
Sanfrecce Hiroshima	2005	J1 League	27	0	0	0	6	0	—		33	0
Sanfrecce Hiroshima	2006	J1 League	33	0	2	0	5	0	—		40	0
Sanfrecce Hiroshima	2007	J1 League	31	0	5	0	8	0	—		44	0
Sanfrecce Hiroshima	2008	J2 League	0	0	0	0	—		—		0	0
Sanfrecce Hiroshima	2009	J1 League	0	0	0	0	0	0	—		0	0
Sanfrecce Hiroshima	2010	J1 League	0	0	0	0	0	0	0	0	0	0
Career total			331	0	26	0	46	0	0	0	403	0

=== International ===
Appearances and goals by national team and year
National team	Year	Apps	Goals
Japan
Japan	1999	1	0
Total		1	0

== Honours ==
Japan

- AFC Asian Cup: 2000
