= 1999 Sanfrecce Hiroshima season =

Sanfrecce Hiroshima
1999 season
- Manager: Eddie Thomson
- Stadium: Hiroshima Big Arch
- J.League 1: 8th
- Emperor's Cup: Runners-up
- J.League Cup: 2nd Round
- Top goalscorer: Tatsuhiko Kubo (13)
Home colours	Away colours

1999 Sanfrecce Hiroshima season

== Competitions ==
Competitions	Position
J.League 1	8th / 16 clubs
Emperor's Cup	Runners-up
J.League Cup	2nd Round

== Domestic results ==
=== J.League 1 ===
6 March 1999 1-1	Cerezo Osaka	2-1	Sanfrecce Hiroshima	Osaka Nagai Stadium
JST (UTC+09)

13 March 1999 1-2	Sanfrecce Hiroshima	0-1	Júbilo Iwata	Hiroshima Big Arch
JST (UTC+09)

20 March 1999 1-3	Kashima Antlers	1-0	Sanfrecce Hiroshima	Tokyo National Stadium
JST (UTC+09)

27 March 1999 1-4	Sanfrecce Hiroshima	4-1	Urawa Red Diamonds	Hiroshima Big Arch
JST (UTC+09)

3 April 1999 1-5	Nagoya Grampus Eight	0-2	Sanfrecce Hiroshima	Mizuho Athletic Stadium
JST (UTC+09)

10 April 1999 1-6	Sanfrecce Hiroshima	2-0	Gamba Osaka	Hiroshima Stadium
JST (UTC+09)

17 April 1999 1-7	JEF United Ichihara	0-2	Sanfrecce Hiroshima	Ichihara Seaside Stadium
JST (UTC+09)

24 April 1999 1-8	Sanfrecce Hiroshima	2-5	Vissel Kobe	Hiroshima Stadium
JST (UTC+09)

28 April 1999 1-9	Avispa Fukuoka	2-3	Sanfrecce Hiroshima	Hakatanomori Football Stadium
JST (UTC+09)

1 May 1999 1-10	Verdy Kawasaki	2-0	Sanfrecce Hiroshima	Todoroki Athletics Stadium
JST (UTC+09)

5 May 1999 1-11	Sanfrecce Hiroshima	3-0	Bellmare Hiratsuka	Hiroshima Big Arch
JST (UTC+09)

8 May 1999 1-12	Kyoto Purple Sanga	0-4	Sanfrecce Hiroshima	Tottori Soccer Stadium
JST (UTC+09)

15 May 1999 1-13	Sanfrecce Hiroshima	3-1	Kashiwa Reysol	Hiroshima Stadium
JST (UTC+09)

22 May 1999 1-14	Yokohama F. Marinos	3-2	Sanfrecce Hiroshima	International Stadium Yokohama
JST (UTC+09)

29 May 1999 1-15	Sanfrecce Hiroshima	2-0	Shimizu S-Pulse	Hiroshima Big Arch
JST (UTC+09)

7 August 1999 2-1	Sanfrecce Hiroshima	2-1	JEF United Ichihara	Hiroshima Stadium
JST (UTC+09)

14 August 1999 2-2	Vissel Kobe	3-2 (GG) (a.e.t.)	Sanfrecce Hiroshima	Kobe Universiade Memorial Stadium
JST (UTC+09)

2 October 1999 2-3	Sanfrecce Hiroshima	2-0	Avispa Fukuoka	Hiroshima Stadium
JST (UTC+09)

21 August 1999 2-4	Sanfrecce Hiroshima	2-3	Verdy Kawasaki	Hiroshima Big Arch
JST (UTC+09)

28 August 1999 2-5	Bellmare Hiratsuka	2-3 (GG) (a.e.t.)	Sanfrecce Hiroshima	Hiratsuka Athletics Stadium
JST (UTC+09)

4 September 1999 2-6	Sanfrecce Hiroshima	2-1	Kyoto Purple Sanga	Hiroshima Stadium
JST (UTC+09)

11 September 1999 2-7	Kashiwa Reysol	0-4	Sanfrecce Hiroshima	Hitachi Kashiwa Soccer Stadium
JST (UTC+09)

15 September 1999 2-8	Sanfrecce Hiroshima	2-1	Yokohama F. Marinos	Hiroshima Big Arch
JST (UTC+09)

18 September 1999 2-9	Shimizu S-Pulse	2-0	Sanfrecce Hiroshima	Nihondaira Sports Stadium
JST (UTC+09)

23 September 1999 2-10	Sanfrecce Hiroshima	1-4	Cerezo Osaka	Hiroshima Big Arch
JST (UTC+09)

30 October 1999 2-11	Sanfrecce Hiroshima	1-0	Kashima Antlers	Hiroshima Big Arch
JST (UTC+09)

7 November 1999 2-12	Júbilo Iwata	5-2	Sanfrecce Hiroshima	Júbilo Iwata Stadium
JST (UTC+09)

20 November 1999 2-13	Gamba Osaka	1-1 (GG) (a.e.t.)	Sanfrecce Hiroshima	Osaka Expo '70 Stadium
JST (UTC+09)

23 November 1999 2-14	Sanfrecce Hiroshima	0-1	Nagoya Grampus Eight	Hiroshima Big Arch
JST (UTC+09)

27 November 1999 2-15	Urawa Red Diamonds	1-0 (GG) (a.e.t.)	Sanfrecce Hiroshima	Urawa Komaba Stadium
JST (UTC+09)

=== Emperor's Cup ===
1st Round	bye

2nd Round	bye

12 December 1999 3rd Round	Sanfrecce Hiroshima	3-2	Honda	Hiroshima Stadium
JST (UTC+09)

19 December 1999 4th Round	Avispa Fukuoka	1-2	Sanfrecce Hiroshima	Gifu Nagaragawa Stadium
JST (UTC+09)

23 December 1999 Quarterfinals	Shimizu S-Pulse	0-2	Sanfrecce Hiroshima	Sendai Stadium
JST (UTC+09)

26 December 1999 Semifinals	Sanfrecce Hiroshima	7-2	Verdy Kawasaki	Osaka Nagai Stadium
JST (UTC+09)

1 January 2000 Final	Nagoya Grampus Eight	2-0	Sanfrecce Hiroshima	Tokyo National Stadium
JST (UTC+09)

=== J.League Cup ===
7 April 1999 1st Round-1	Vegalta Sendai	1-2	Sanfrecce Hiroshima	Sendai Stadium
JST (UTC+09)

14 April 1999 1st Round-2	Sanfrecce Hiroshima	4-1 (6-2 agg.)	Vegalta Sendai	Hiroshima Stadium
JST (UTC+09)

12 June 1999 2nd Round-1	Sanfrecce Hiroshima	2-3	Yokohama F. Marinos	Hiroshima Big Arch
JST (UTC+09)

19 June 1999 2nd Round-2	Yokohama F. Marinos	1-0 (4-2 agg.)	Sanfrecce Hiroshima	Kagawa Marugame Stadium
JST (UTC+09)

== Player statistics ==
No.	Pos.	Nat.	Player	D.o.B. (Age)	Height / Weight	J.League 1		Emperor's Cup		J.League Cup		Total	
No.	Pos.	Nat.	Player	D.o.B. (Age)	Height / Weight	Apps	Goals	Apps	Goals	Apps	Goals	Apps	Goals
1	GK	(Japan)	Kazuya Maekawa	March 22, 1968 (aged 30)	cm / kg	0	0						
2	DF	(Japan)	Hiroshi Miyazawa	November 22, 1970 (aged 28)	cm / kg	0	0						
3	DF	(Japan)	Kentaro Sawada	May 15, 1970 (aged 28)	cm / kg	29	3						
4	MF	(Japan)	Hiroyoshi Kuwabara	October 2, 1971 (aged 27)	cm / kg	26	0						
5	DF	(Japan)	Tetsuya Ito	October 1, 1970 (aged 28)	cm / kg	22	2						
6	DF	(Australia)	Hayden Foxe	June 23, 1977 (aged 21)	cm / kg	22	2						
7	MF	(Japan)	Hajime Moriyasu	August 23, 1968 (aged 30)	cm / kg	27	1						
8	MF	(Japan)	Yasuhiro Yoshida	July 14, 1969 (aged 29)	cm / kg	19	0						
9	MF	(Japan)	Toshihiro Yamaguchi	November 19, 1971 (aged 27)	cm / kg	26	2						
10	FW	(Japan)	Tatsuhiko Kubo	June 18, 1976 (aged 22)	cm / kg	25	13						
11	MF	(Australia)	Aurelio Vidmar	February 3, 1967 (aged 32)	cm / kg	9	2						
11	FW	(Japan)	Yasuyuki Moriyama	May 1, 1969 (aged 29)	cm / kg	11	3						
12	DF	(Japan)	Toshimi Kikuchi	June 17, 1973 (aged 25)	cm / kg	1	0						
13	MF	(Japan)	Satoshi Koga	February 12, 1970 (aged 29)	cm / kg	6	0						
14	FW	(Japan)	Susumu Oki	February 23, 1976 (aged 23)	cm / kg	6	1						
15	MF	(Japan)	Chikara Fujimoto	October 31, 1977 (aged 21)	cm / kg	27	5						
16	GK	(Japan)	Takashi Shimoda	November 28, 1975 (aged 23)	cm / kg	30	0						
17	MF	(Japan)	Kota Hattori	November 22, 1977 (aged 21)	cm / kg	28	1						
18	DF	(Australia)	Tony Popovic	July 4, 1973 (aged 25)	cm / kg	23	6						
19	DF	(Japan)	Kenichi Uemura	April 22, 1974 (aged 24)	cm / kg	29	7						
20	FW	(Japan)	Kazuyoshi Matsunaga	November 13, 1977 (aged 21)	cm / kg	0	0						
21	MF	(Japan)	Makoto Okubo	May 3, 1975 (aged 23)	cm / kg	3	0						
22	GK	(Japan)	Hiroshi Sato	March 7, 1972 (aged 26)	cm / kg	0	0						
23	DF	(Japan)	Shinya Kawashima	July 20, 1978 (aged 20)	cm / kg	4	0						
24	MF	(Japan)	Yuji Ishikawa	July 2, 1979 (aged 19)	cm / kg	0	0						
25	DF	(Japan)	Yosuke Ikehata	June 7, 1979 (aged 19)	cm / kg	0	0						
26	FW	(Japan)	Yutaka Takahashi	September 29, 1980 (aged 18)	cm / kg	24	6						
27	FW	(Japan)	Takenori Ikeda	February 11, 1981 (aged 18)	cm / kg	0	0						
28	FW	(Japan)	Yuya Matsuoka	June 15, 1978 (aged 20)	cm / kg	0	0						
29	FW	(Japan)	Sachio Yoshida	April 6, 1980 (aged 18)	cm / kg	0	0						
30	MF	(Japan)	Kohei Miyazaki	February 6, 1981 (aged 18)	cm / kg	0	0						
31	GK	(Japan)	Motoki Ueda	May 14, 1979 (aged 19)	cm / kg	0	0						
32	MF	(Japan)	Junya Ohata	April 6, 1979 (aged 19)	cm / kg	0	0						
33	MF	(Japan)	Ryoji Yukutomo	April 20, 1979 (aged 19)	cm / kg	0	0						
34	FW	(Japan)	Masahiro Akimoto	April 15, 1979 (aged 19)	cm / kg	0	0						
35	DF	(Japan)	Kazuya Yamashita	April 2, 1979 (aged 19)	cm / kg	0	0						
38	MF	(Japan)	Kazuyuki Morisaki	May 9, 1981 (aged 17)	cm / kg	3	0						

== Other pages ==
- (in Japanese) J.League official site
