= Tetsuya Ito =

Japanese footballer

Tetsuya Ito 伊藤 哲也
Personal information
- Full name: Tetsuya Ito
- Date of birth: 1 October 1970 (age 56)
- Place of birth: Chiba, Japan
- Height: 1.80 m (5 ft 11 in)
- Position: Defender

Youth career
- 1986–1988: Yachiyo Shoin High School
- 1989–1992: Hosei University

Senior career*
Years	Team	Apps	(Gls)
1993	NKK	13	(1)
1994–1996	Yokohama Marinos	14	(0)
1997–2000	Sanfrecce Hiroshima	100	(6)
2001–2003	FC Tokyo	46	(2)
2004	Oita Trinita	0	(0)
2005–2007	FC Gifu	13	(3)
Total		186	(12)
Medal record
Yokohama Marinos
Winner	J1 League	1995
Sanfrecce Hiroshima
Runner-up	Emperor's Cup	1999
- * Club domestic league appearances and goals

Tetsuya Ito (伊藤 哲也, Itō Tetsuya; born 1 October 1970) is a former Japanese football player.

== Playing career ==
Ito was born in Chiba on 1 October 1970. After graduating from Hosei University, he joined NKK in 1993. Although he played many matches as center back in 1993 season, the club was disbanded end of 1993 season. In 1994, he moved to Yokohama Marinos. However he could hardly play in the match behind Japan national team defender Masami Ihara and Norio Omura. In 1997, he moved to Sanfrecce Hiroshima. He became a regular player and played many matches as center back of three back defense with Kenichi Uemura and Tony Popovic for a long time. In 2001, he moved to FC Tokyo. He played many matches as center back with Sandro in 2001 and Jean in 2002. However he could not play at all in the match for injury in 2003. In 2004, he moved to Oita Trinita. However he could not play at all in the match for injury and he retired end of 2004 season. In July 2005, he came back as player at Regional Leagues club FC Gifu. The club was promoted to Japan Football League from 2007 and he retired at the end of the 2007 season.

== Club statistics ==
Club performance			League		Cup		League Cup		Total	
Season	Club	League	Apps	Goals	Apps	Goals	Apps	Goals	Apps	Goals
Japan			League		Emperor's Cup		J.League Cup		Total	
1993	NKK	Football League	13	1	1	0	-		14	1
1994	Yokohama Marinos	J1 League	6	0	0	0	1	0	7	0
1995	Yokohama Marinos	J1 League	7	0	0	0	-		7	0
1996	Yokohama Marinos	J1 League	1	0	0	0	0	0	1	0
1997	Sanfrecce Hiroshima	J1 League	26	0	2	0	5	0	33	0
1998	Sanfrecce Hiroshima	J1 League	24	3	2	0	0	0	26	3
1999	Sanfrecce Hiroshima	J1 League	22	2	3	0	2	0	27	2
2000	Sanfrecce Hiroshima	J1 League	28	1	1	0	2	0	31	1
2001	FC Tokyo	J1 League	23	1	0	0	3	0	26	1
2002	FC Tokyo	J1 League	23	1	0	0	6	0	29	1
2003	FC Tokyo	J1 League	0	0	0	0	0	0	0	0
2004	Oita Trinita	J1 League	0	0	0	0	0	0	0	0
2005	FC Gifu	Regional Leagues	3	1	-		-		3	1
2006	FC Gifu	Regional Leagues	8	1	1	0	-		9	1
2007	FC Gifu	Football League	2	1	1	0	-		3	1
Career total			186	12	11	0	19	0	216	12
