= 2000 Sanfrecce Hiroshima season =

Sanfrecce Hiroshima
2000 season
- Manager: Eddie Thomson
- Stadium: Hiroshima Big Arch
- J.League 1: 11th
- Emperor's Cup: 4th Round
- J.League Cup: 2nd Round
- Top goalscorer: Tatsuhiko Kubo (11)
Home colours	Away colours

2000 Sanfrecce Hiroshima season

== Competitions ==
Competitions	Position
J.League 1	11th / 16 clubs
Emperor's Cup	4th round
J.League Cup	2nd round

== Domestic results ==
=== J.League 1 ===
11 March 2000 1-1	Vissel Kobe	1-0	Sanfrecce Hiroshima	Kobe Universiade Memorial Stadium
JST (UTC+09)

18 March 2000 1-2	Sanfrecce Hiroshima	1-1 (GG) (a.e.t.)	JEF United Ichihara	Hiroshima Big Arch
JST (UTC+09)

25 March 2000 1-3	Kawasaki Frontale	0-1	Sanfrecce Hiroshima	Todoroki Athletics Stadium
JST (UTC+09)

1 April 2000 1-4	Sanfrecce Hiroshima	2-0	Kyoto Purple Sanga	Hiroshima Big Arch
JST (UTC+09)

5 April 2000 1-5	Sanfrecce Hiroshima	1-2	Kashiwa Reysol	Hiroshima Stadium
JST (UTC+09)

8 April 2000 1-6	Gamba Osaka	1-2 (GG) (a.e.t.)	Sanfrecce Hiroshima	Osaka Expo '70 Stadium
JST (UTC+09)

24 May 2000 1-7	Shimizu S-Pulse	1-0	Sanfrecce Hiroshima	Nihondaira Sports Stadium
JST (UTC+09)

22 April 2000 1-8	Sanfrecce Hiroshima	0-1	FC Tokyo	Hiroshima Big Arch
JST (UTC+09)

29 April 2000 1-9	Avispa Fukuoka	1-0 (GG) (a.e.t.)	Sanfrecce Hiroshima	Hakatanomori Football Stadium
JST (UTC+09)

3 May 2000 1-10	Sanfrecce Hiroshima	2-0	Yokohama F. Marinos	Hiroshima Big Arch
JST (UTC+09)

6 May 2000 1-11	Cerezo Osaka	1-0	Sanfrecce Hiroshima	Osaka Nagai Stadium
JST (UTC+09)

13 May 2000 1-12	Sanfrecce Hiroshima	2-1 (GG) (a.e.t.)	Verdy Kawasaki	Hiroshima Big Arch
JST (UTC+09)

17 May 2000 1-13	Júbilo Iwata	3-4 (GG) (a.e.t.)	Sanfrecce Hiroshima	Júbilo Iwata Stadium
JST (UTC+09)

20 May 2000 1-14	Sanfrecce Hiroshima	1-0	Kashima Antlers	Hiroshima Big Arch
JST (UTC+09)

27 May 2000 1-15	Nagoya Grampus Eight	2-1	Sanfrecce Hiroshima	Mizuho Rugby Stadium
JST (UTC+09)

24 June 2000 2-1	Sanfrecce Hiroshima	1-0	Vissel Kobe	Hiroshima Big Arch
JST (UTC+09)

1 July 2000 2-2	JEF United Ichihara	2-2 (GG) (a.e.t.)	Sanfrecce Hiroshima	Ichihara Seaside Stadium
JST (UTC+09)

8 July 2000 2-3	Sanfrecce Hiroshima	3-1	Cerezo Osaka	Hiroshima Stadium
JST (UTC+09)

15 July 2000 2-4	Yokohama F. Marinos	4-2	Sanfrecce Hiroshima	Yokohama Mitsuzawa Stadium
JST (UTC+09)

22 July 2000 2-5	Sanfrecce Hiroshima	1-2	Avispa Fukuoka	Hiroshima Big Arch
JST (UTC+09)

26 July 2000 2-6	FC Tokyo	1-2	Sanfrecce Hiroshima	Tokyo National Stadium
JST (UTC+09)

29 July 2000 2-7	Sanfrecce Hiroshima	1-0	Shimizu S-Pulse	Hiroshima Big Arch
JST (UTC+09)

5 August 2000 2-8	Kyoto Purple Sanga	3-1	Sanfrecce Hiroshima	Nishikyogoku Athletic Stadium
JST (UTC+09)

12 August 2000 2-9	Sanfrecce Hiroshima	0-1 (GG) (a.e.t.)	Kawasaki Frontale	Hiroshima Big Arch
JST (UTC+09)

19 August 2000 2-10	Sanfrecce Hiroshima	2-3	Gamba Osaka	Hiroshima Big Arch
JST (UTC+09)

8 November 2000 2-11	Kashiwa Reysol	2-1 (GG) (a.e.t.)	Sanfrecce Hiroshima	Hitachi Kashiwa Soccer Stadium
JST (UTC+09)

11 November 2000 2-12	Sanfrecce Hiroshima	4-0	Nagoya Grampus Eight	Hiroshima Big Arch
JST (UTC+09)

18 November 2000 2-13	Kashima Antlers	2-1 (GG) (a.e.t.)	Sanfrecce Hiroshima	Tottori Soccer Stadium
JST (UTC+09)

23 November 2000 2-14	Sanfrecce Hiroshima	0-3	Júbilo Iwata	Hiroshima Big Arch
JST (UTC+09)

26 November 2000 2-15	Verdy Kawasaki	1-2 (GG) (a.e.t.)	Sanfrecce Hiroshima	Todoroki Athletics Stadium
JST (UTC+09)

=== Emperor's Cup ===
1st Round	bye

2nd Round	bye

10 December 2000 3rd Round	Sanfrecce Hiroshima	7-0	Mito HollyHock	Hiroshima Stadium
JST (UTC+09)

17 December 2000 4th Round	Vissel Kobe	1-0	Sanfrecce Hiroshima	Kobe Universiade Memorial Stadium
JST (UTC+09)

=== J.League Cup ===
12 April 2000 1st Round-1	Montedio Yamagata	0-3	Sanfrecce Hiroshima	Yamagata Park Stadium
JST (UTC+09)

19 April 2000 1st Round-2	Sanfrecce Hiroshima	0-1 (3-1 agg.)	Montedio Yamagata	Hiroshima Stadium
JST (UTC+09)

28 June 2000 2nd Round-1	Yokohama F. Marinos	4-1	Sanfrecce Hiroshima	Yokohama Mitsuzawa Stadium
JST (UTC+09)

5 July 2000 2nd Round-2	Sanfrecce Hiroshima	1-0 (2-4 agg.)	Yokohama F. Marinos	Hiroshima Stadium
JST (UTC+09)

== Player statistics ==
No.	Pos.	Nat.	Player	D.o.B. (Age)	Height / Weight	J.League 1		Emperor's Cup		J.League Cup		Total	
No.	Pos.	Nat.	Player	D.o.B. (Age)	Height / Weight	Apps	Goals	Apps	Goals	Apps	Goals	Apps	Goals
1	GK	(Japan)	Takashi Shimoda	November 28, 1975 (aged 24)	cm / kg	30	0						
2	DF	(Japan)	Hiroshi Miyazawa	November 22, 1970 (aged 29)	cm / kg	0	0						
3	DF	(Japan)	Kentaro Sawada	May 15, 1970 (aged 29)	cm / kg	30	3						
4	MF	(Japan)	Hiroyoshi Kuwabara	October 2, 1971 (aged 28)	cm / kg	30	0						
5	DF	(Japan)	Tetsuya Ito	October 1, 1970 (aged 29)	cm / kg	28	1						
6	DF	(Australia)	Hayden Foxe	June 23, 1977 (aged 22)	cm / kg	0	0						
7	MF	(Japan)	Hajime Moriyasu	August 23, 1968 (aged 31)	cm / kg	22	0						
8	MF	(Japan)	Makoto Okubo	May 3, 1975 (aged 24)	cm / kg	8	0						
9	MF	(Japan)	Toshihiro Yamaguchi	November 19, 1971 (aged 28)	cm / kg	2	0						
10	FW	(Japan)	Tatsuhiko Kubo	June 18, 1976 (aged 23)	cm / kg	24	11						
11	MF	(Japan)	Chikara Fujimoto	October 31, 1977 (aged 22)	cm / kg	27	2						
12	GK	(Japan)	Ryuji Kato	December 24, 1969 (aged 30)	cm / kg	0	0						
13	MF	(Japan)	Satoshi Koga	February 12, 1970 (aged 30)	cm / kg	16	0						
14	FW	(Japan)	Yutaka Takahashi	September 29, 1980 (aged 19)	cm / kg	12	0						
15	FW	(Japan)	Yusaku Ueno	November 1, 1973 (aged 26)	cm / kg	5	1						
16	DF	(Japan)	Shinya Kawashima	July 20, 1978 (aged 21)	cm / kg	23	1						
17	MF	(Japan)	Kota Hattori	November 22, 1977 (aged 22)	cm / kg	29	1						
18	DF	(Australia)	Tony Popovic	July 4, 1973 (aged 26)	cm / kg	21	3						
19	DF	(Japan)	Kenichi Uemura	April 22, 1974 (aged 25)	cm / kg	28	6						
20	MF	(Japan)	Kazuyuki Morisaki	May 9, 1981 (aged 18)	cm / kg	24	3						
21	GK	(Japan)	Hiroshi Sato	March 7, 1972 (aged 28)	cm / kg	0	0						
22	MF	(Japan)	Kōji Morisaki	May 9, 1981 (aged 18)	cm / kg	4	0						
23	DF	(Japan)	Yūichi Komano	July 25, 1981 (aged 18)	cm / kg	0	0						
24	MF	(Japan)	Yuji Ishikawa	July 2, 1979 (aged 20)	cm / kg	0	0						
25	MF	(Japan)	Kyohei Yamagata	September 7, 1981 (aged 18)	cm / kg	0	0						
26	MF	(Japan)	Yuki Matsushita	December 7, 1981 (aged 18)	cm / kg	2	0						
27	FW	(Japan)	Genki Nakayama	September 15, 1981 (aged 18)	cm / kg	0	0						
28	DF	(Japan)	Kosuke Yatsuda	March 17, 1982 (aged 17)	cm / kg	0	0						
29	FW	(Japan)	Sachio Yoshida	April 6, 1980 (aged 19)	cm / kg	0	0						
30	MF	(Japan)	Kohei Miyazaki	February 6, 1981 (aged 19)	cm / kg	0	0						
31	GK	(Japan)	Motoki Ueda	May 14, 1979 (aged 20)	cm / kg	0	0						
32	FW	(Portugal)	Miguel Simão	February 26, 1973 (aged 27)	cm / kg	3	0						
33	MF	(Japan)	Keisuke Kurihara	May 20, 1973 (aged 26)	cm / kg	18	4						
34	MF	(Australia)	Steve Corica	March 24, 1973 (aged 26)	cm / kg	21	3						
