= Aleksander Midtsian =

Norwegian footballer and coach (born 1982)

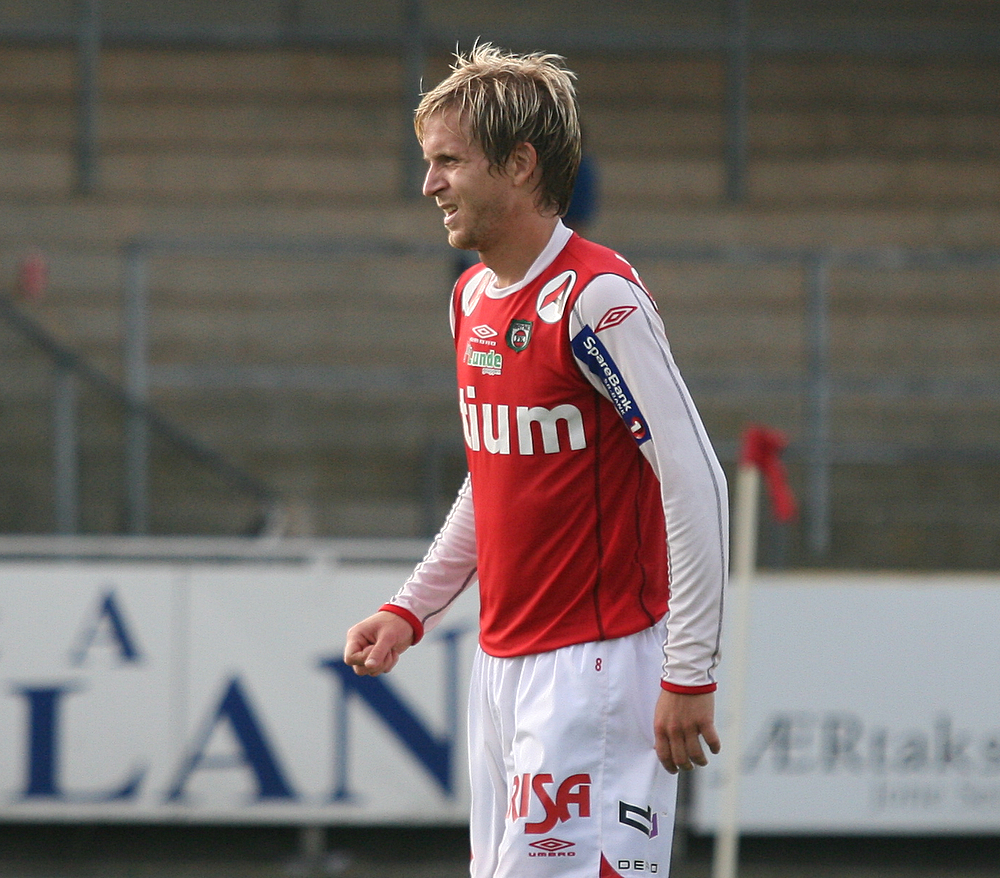

Personal information
- Full name: Aleksander Ødegaard Midtsian
- Date of birth: 2 October 1982 (age 44)
- Place of birth: Oslo, Norway
- Height: 1.83 m (6 ft 0 in)

Senior career*
Years	Team	Apps	(Gls)
1999	KFUM-Oslo		
2000–2002	Lyn Oslo	24	(1)
2003	Oslo Øst	8	(0)
2003–2004	Football Kingz FC		
2004	Ullensaker/Kisa IL		
2005–2006	Manglerud Star Toppfotball		
2007	Bryne FK	12	(2)
2007	Kristiansund BK→(loan)		
2008–2014	Bryne FK	147	(9)
2015	Rosseland		
2016–2017	Bryne FK 2		
2017–2018	Siddis SK		
2018-2021	Brodd 2		
2021-2022	Egersunds IK 2		

International career
- Norway U21

Managerial career
- Bryne FK (youth)
- * Club domestic league appearances and goals

Aleksander Midtsian (born 2 October 1982) is a Norwegian footballer and coach who played in Norway for Egersunds IK II before retiring in 2022. He continued a career in management, and is currently Assistant Manager of Sandnes Ulf.

== New Zealand ==
Because of a transfer technicality, Midtsian was unable to play in the opening round of the 2003-04 National Soccer League, much to the discomfiture of Football Kingz. He then made his debut in a 1-2 loss to Sydney United, scoring his team's only goal in the 53rd minute.

== Personal life ==
He is the son of Geir Midtsian.
