= Satoshi Koga =

Japanese footballer

Satoshi Koga 古賀 聡
Personal information
- Full name: Satoshi Koga
- Date of birth: 12 February 1970 (age 56)
- Place of birth: Yokohama, Japan
- Height: 1.74 m (5 ft 8 1/2 in)
- Position: Midfielder

Youth career
- 1985–1987: Waseda Jitsugyo High School
- 1988–1991: Waseda University

Senior career*
| Years | Team | Apps | (Gls) |
| 1992–1996 | Kashima Antlers | 30 | (2) |
| 1997 | Brummell Sendai | 24 | (0) |
| 1998–2000 | Sanfrecce Hiroshima | 35 | (0) |
| Total | | 89 | (2) |
Medal record
Kashima Antlers
| Winner | J1 League | 1996 |
| Runner-up | J1 League | 1993 |
| Runner-up | Emperor's Cup | 1993 |
Sanfrecce Hiroshima
| Runner-up | Emperor's Cup | 1999 |
- * Club domestic league appearances and goals

Satoshi Koga (古賀 聡, Koga Satoshi; born 12 February 1970) is a former Japanese football player.

== Playing career ==
Koga was born in Yokohama on 12 February 1970. After graduating from Waseda University, he joined the Kashima Antlers in 1992. He played mainly as an offensive midfielder and forward. He moved to the Japan Football League club Brummell Sendai in 1997. He played in many matches and moved to Sanfrecce Hiroshima in 1998. He retired at the end of the 2000 season.

== Career statistics ==
Appearances and goals by club, season and competition
| Club | Season | League | | | Emperor's Cup | | J.League Cup | | Total | |
| Club | Season | Division | Apps | Goals | Apps | Goals | Apps | Goals | Apps | Goals |
|---|---|---|---|---|---|---|---|---|---|---|
| Kashima Antlers | 1992 | J1 League | - | | 0 | 0 | 5 | 0 | 5 | 0 |
| Kashima Antlers | 1993 | J1 League | 15 | 1 | 1 | 0 | 5 | 0 | 21 | 1 |
| Kashima Antlers | 1994 | J1 League | 0 | 0 | 0 | 0 | 0 | 0 | 0 | 0 |
| Kashima Antlers | 1995 | J1 League | 15 | 1 | 0 | 0 | - | | 15 | 1 |
| Kashima Antlers | 1996 | J1 League | 0 | 0 | 0 | 0 | 0 | 0 | 0 | 0 |
| Kashima Antlers | Total | | 30 | 2 | 1 | 0 | 10 | 0 | 41 | 2 |
| Brummell Sendai | 1997 | Football League | 24 | 0 | 2 | 0 | 2 | 0 | 28 | 0 |
| Sanfrecce Hiroshima | 1998 | J1 League | 13 | 0 | 3 | 0 | 2 | 0 | 18 | 0 |
| Sanfrecce Hiroshima | 1999 | J1 League | 6 | 0 | 4 | 0 | 4 | 0 | 14 | 0 |
| Sanfrecce Hiroshima | 2000 | J1 League | 16 | 0 | 0 | 0 | 2 | 0 | 18 | 0 |
| Sanfrecce Hiroshima | Total | | 35 | 0 | 7 | 0 | 8 | 0 | 50 | 0 |
| Career total | | | 89 | 2 | 10 | 0 | 20 | 0 | 119 | 2 |
