= Jonathon Taylor =

New Zealand footballer

Jonathan Taylor
Personal information
- Full name: Jonathan Taylor
- Date of birth: 12 September 1979 (age 47)
- Position: Defender

Team information
- Current team: Napier City Rovers

Senior career*
Years	Team	Apps	(Gls)
2002	Napier City Rovers		
2002–2003	The Football Kingz	16	(0)
2004–2009	Napier City Rovers		
2009–2010	Hawke's Bay United	10	(0)

International career
2001	New Zealand	1	(0)
- * Club domestic league appearances and goals as of 30 April 2010

Jonathon Taylor (born 12 September 1979) is a New Zealand soccer player. He plays as a defender.

== Club career ==
He played for Napier City Rovers before joining Football Kingz in the Australian National Football League for 1 season, before returning to Napier.

He played the 2009/2010 season for Hawke's Bay United in the NZFC.

== International career ==
Taylor made a solitary A-international appearance for the New Zealand national soccer team, the All Whites, in 2001, as New Zealand beat Cook Islands 2–0 in a world cup qualifier.
