= Hiroshi Miyazawa (footballer) =

Japanese footballer and manager

Hiroshi Miyazawa 宮澤 浩
Personal information
- Full name: Hiroshi Miyazawa
- Date of birth: November 22, 1970 (age 55)
- Place of birth: Hokkaido, Japan
- Height: 1.84 m (6 ft 1/2 in)
- Position: Defender

Youth career
- 1986–1988: Fujisawa Nishi High School
- 1989–1992: Chuo University

Senior career*
Years	Team	Apps	(Gls)
1993–1995	JEF United Ichihara	19	(0)
1996–1997	Bellmare Hiratsuka	29	(0)
1998–2000	Sanfrecce Hiroshima	21	(1)
2000–2001	Canberra Cosmos	24	(0)
2001–2003	Football Kingz	35	(0)
Total		128	(1)

Managerial career
- 2007–2014: Onehunga Sports U19
- 2014–2019: Onehunga Sports
- 2017–2020: New Zealand U20 (assistant)
- 2020–2021: Auckland United
- 2021–2024: Mumbai City (assistant)
- 2025–: Al-Kholood (assistant)
Medal record
Sanfrecce Hiroshima
Runner-up	Emperor's Cup	1999
- * Club domestic league appearances and goals

Hiroshi Miyazawa (宮澤 浩, Miyazawa Hiroshi; born November 22, 1970) is a former Japanese football player and football manager. He is currently the assistant manager of Saudi Pro League club Al-Kholood.

== Playing career ==
Miyazawa was born in Hokkaido on November 22, 1970. After graduating from Chuo University, he joined JEF United Ichihara in 1993. He played as center back from first season. However, his opportunity to play decreased from 1994 and he moved to Bellmare Hiratsuka in 1996. Although he played as regular player in 1996, he could hardly play in the match in 1997. In 1998, he moved to Sanfrecce Hiroshima. Although he played many matches in 1998, he could not play at all in 1999 due to injury. In October 2000, he moved to Australian club Canberra Cosmos. However, the club was disbanded in 2001. He moved to New Zealand club Football Kingz, where he retired in 2003.

== Club statistics ==
Club performance			League		Cup		League Cup		Total	
Season	Club	League	Apps	Goals	Apps	Goals	Apps	Goals	Apps	Goals
Japan			League		Emperor's Cup		J.League Cup		Total	
1993	JEF United Ichihara	J1 League	13	0	3	0	6	0	22	0
1994	JEF United Ichihara	J1 League	5	0	0	0	0	0	5	0
1995	JEF United Ichihara	J1 League	1	0	0	0	-		1	0
1996	Bellmare Hiratsuka	J1 League	24	0	3	0	14	0	41	0
1997	Bellmare Hiratsuka	J1 League	5	0	0	0	4	0	9	0
1998	Sanfrecce Hiroshima	J1 League	21	1	0	0	3	0	24	1
1999	Sanfrecce Hiroshima	J1 League	0	0	0	0	0	0	0	0
2000	Sanfrecce Hiroshima	J1 League	0	0	0	0	0	0	0	0
Total			69	1	6	0	27	0	102	1
