= David Rayner =

New Zealand footballer

Personal information
- Full name: David Rayner
- Date of birth: 18 March 1982 (age 44)
- Place of birth: Tauranga, New Zealand
- Position: Defender

Team information
- Current team: Tauranga City AFC U23s

Youth career
- 1999–2001: Newcastle United

International career
Years	Team	Apps	(Gls)
1999	New Zealand U-17	4	(0)
2000	New Zealand	1	(0)

David Rayner (born 18 March 1982) is an association football player who represented New Zealand at international level.

He represented New Zealand Under-17 at the 1999 FIFA U-17 World Championship, appearing in all three group games.

Rayner made a solitary official international appearance for New Zealand as a substitute in a 3–1 win over Malaysia on 21 June 2000.
