= Espen Schjerven =

Norwegian footballer (born 1983)

Personal information
- Date of birth: 8 May 1983 (age 43)
- Place of birth: Norway
- Positions: Midfielder; forward

Senior career*
Years	Team	Apps	(Gls)
-2003	Lyn Fotball	4	(0)
2003-2004	Football Kingz FC	14	(1)
2004-2006	Manglerud Star Toppfotball	18+	(6+)
2007	Korsvoll IL		
- Korsvoll IL C
- * Club domestic league appearances and goals

Espen Schjerven (born 8 May 1983 in Norway) is a Norwegian retired footballer. Besides Norway, he has played in New Zealand.

== Career ==
Schjerven started his career with Lyn Fotball.

After helping Lyn Fotball finish 3rd in 2002, Schjerven signed for Football Kingz in New Zealand. After that, he signed for Manglerud Star Toppfotball.

In 2006, he went to Poland for medical studies after playing in the Norwegian second and third divisions.

In 2008, at the age of 25, he started playing for the C team of Norwegian lower league side Korsvoll IL, scoring 3 goals on debut against IL Jardar's 2nd team. Despite receiving offers from teams in higher divisions, Schjerven stayed put with the Korsvoll IL C team due to the possibility of breaking goal records.
