= Siddis SK =

Football club in Norway

Logo.

Siddis Sportsklubb is a football club based in Stavanger, Norway. The club has competed in the Norwegian Fourth Division, the highest level the club has competed at.

== History ==
Siddis Sportsklubb was founded in 2005. The club has called and marketed itself as FC Show even though the Norwegian Football Federation does not allow to call them that. Besides football, the club has had an American football team, cheerleading, a handball team that plays in skirts, floorball, and rugby.

According to local media, Siddis Sportsklubb "has made a name for itself over many years as a splash of color in local football." Siddis Sportsklubb has received attention from foreign media such as FourFourTwo because of the badge of the club. The club colours are pink and black.

In 2014, Siddis Sportsklubb was blacklisted by the Rogaland football referees' association for not paying referees on time. In 2021, the club was banned from their own stadium.
