= Mauro Donoso =

Chilean soccer player (born 1971)

Personal information
- Full name: Mauro Jacddul Donoso Godoy
- Date of birth: 23 December 1971 (age 54)
- Place of birth: Santiago, Chile
- Position: Defender

Senior career*
Years	Team	Apps	(Gls)
1992	O'Higgins		
1992–1995	Unión Española	48	(0)
1996–1998	Deportes Antofagasta	33+	(1+)
1999–2001	Deportes Concepción		
2002	Audax Italiano		
2002–2004	Football Kingz	25	(1)
2004	Waitakere City		
2005	Huachipato	15	(0)

Managerial career
- Auckland United (women)
- * Club domestic league appearances and goals

Mauro Jacddul Donoso Godoy (born 23 December 1971 in Chile) is a Chilean retired footballer who now works as head coach of Auckland United FC Women in New Zealand.

== Playing career ==
Donoso started his senior career with O'Higgins. In 1992, he signed for Unión Española in the Chilean Primera División, where he made forty-eight league appearances and scored zero goals. After that, he played for Chilean clubs C.D. Antofagasta, Deportes Concepción, and Audax Italiano, New Zealand club Football Kingz, and Chilean club C.D. Huachipato before retiring in 2005.

== Coaching career ==
Donoso made his home in New Zealand and works as football manager for Auckland United women's team.

== Personal life ==
He is a relative of the former footballer Malcom Moyano and Matias Villablanca, Iván Ahumada .
