= Glen Collins (footballer) =

New Zealand footballer

Personal information
- Full name: Glenn (Alex) Collins
- Date of birth: 7 September 1977 (age 49)
- Place of birth: Christchurch, New Zealand
- Height: 1.78 m (5 ft 10 in)
- Position: Midfielder

Team information
- Current team: Canterbury United

Senior career*
Years	Team	Apps	(Gls)
1998–2002	Greensboro College		
2002	Carolina Dynamo	13	(0)
2003–2004	The Football Kingz	18	(0)
2006–2007	Canterbury United	16	(0)
2009–2010	Canterbury United	15	(0)

International career^{‡}
2002	New Zealand	3	(0)
- * Club domestic league appearances and goals as of 30 April 2010 ‡ National team caps and goals as of 1 February 2007

Glen Collins (born 7 September 1977) is an association football player who briefly represented New Zealand at international level.

== Club career ==
He played as a midfielder and returned to football to play for NZFC outfit Canterbury United, having switched codes to rugby for five years.

== International career ==
He has played 3 times for the New Zealand national soccer team, the All Whites in 2002.
