= Darren Young (New Zealand footballer) =

New Zealand footballer

Personal information
- Full name: Darren Young
- Date of birth: 28 February 1981 (age 45)
- Place of birth: Whitehaven, United Kingdom
- Height: 1.82 m (6 ft 0 in)
- Positions: Right back; left back

Senior career*
Years	Team	Apps	(Gls)
1999	Waitakere City	36	(12)
1999–2002	Barnsley	0	(0)
2002–2004	Football Kingz	15	
2002–2004	→ Waitakere City (loan)	9	(0)
2003	Auckland City	4	(2)
2004	Barnsley	1	(0)
2005	Limerick	11	(1)
2006	Waterford United	33	(0)
2007–2009	Athlone Town	31	(3)
2010	Mervue United	11	(0)
2011	Athlone Town	4	

International career
2001	New Zealand U-20	4	(0)
- * Club domestic league appearances and goals

Darren Young (born 28 February 1981) is a New Zealand former professional footballer who played as a defender.

His career included time at Barnsley, Football Kingz, Waterford United and Athlone Town. He also represented New Zealand at under-20 level.

Darren Young was born in Whitehaven in Cumbria. At the age of 11, he emigrated with his family to Auckland where he played football for New Zealand Schoolboys.

Young started his senior career as a 17 year old playing for Waitakere City. In this season he became you youngest player to play in the Chatham Cup final since 1972. He was spotted by Barnsley and returned to the UK at the age of 18. Young decided to leave Oakwell in 2002, turning down a chance to stay in England with Rochdale and instead returning to New Zealand where he played professionally with Football Kingz.

Young's former manager at Barnsley, Dave Bassett, contacted him about a move to Ireland and he spent five years at Limerick City, Waterford United, Athlone Town and Mervue United before returning to Barnsley with his wife, who is from Ardsley.

He now resides in Dodworth, Barnsley with his wife Claire and his Daughter Emily (13) and son Harry (9). Harry is currently contracted to the Sheffield Wednesday academy, and has been there since the age of 6 years old
