= List of North West Sydney Spirit FC players =

North West Sydney Spirit Football Club, an association football club based in North Sydney, Sydney, was founded in 1998 as Northern Spirit before transforming into the Gladesville Hornsby Football Association in 2004. All players who have played in at least one match prior to 2004 are listed below.

Paul Henderson holds the record for the greatest number of appearances for North West Sydney Spirit. Between 1998 and 2004 the Australian goalkeeper played 133 times for the club. The club's goalscoring record is held by Ben Burgess, who scored 16 goals between 2000 and 2001.

== Key ==
- The list is ordered first by date of debut, and then if necessary in alphabetical order.
- Appearances as a substitute are included.
- Statistics are correct up to all matches prior to 2004. Where a player left the club permanently after this date, his statistics are updated to his date of leaving.

Positions key
GK	Goalkeeper
DF	Defender
MF	Midfielder
FW	Forward

Nationality
Unless otherwise noted, the nationality of a player is determined by the country/countries which he has played for, or if said person has not played international football, their country of birth.
Position
Playing positions are listed according to the tactical formations that were employed at the time.
Club career
Club career is defined as the first and last calendar years in which the player appeared for the club in any of the competitions listed below.
Total appearances and Total goals
Total appearances and goals comprise those in the National Soccer League.

== Players ==
List of North West Sydney Spirit FC players
Player	Nationality	Pos	Club career	Starts	Subs	Total	Goals
Player	Nationality	Pos	Club career	Appearances			Goals
Graham Arnold	Australia	FW	1998–2001	44	3	47	5
Paul Bilokapic	Australia	MF	1998–2001	55	11	66	5
Eddy Bosnar	Australia	DF	1998–1999	4	9	13	0
Luke Casserly	Australia	DF	1998–2000	43	0	43	2
Troy Cranney	Australia	MF	1998–2002	60	7	67	1
Ian Crook	England	MF	1998–2000	17	7	24	2
Michael Cunico	Australia	DF	1998–2001	63	18	81	2
Paul Henderson	Australia	GK	1998–2004	132	1	133	0
Kresimir Marusic	Australia	MF	1998–1999	27	0	27	8
Marko Rudan	Australia	DF	1998–2000	42	4	46	2
Robbie Slater	Australia	DF	1998–2001	58	3	61	10
Daniel Watkins	Australia	FW	1998–1999; 2000–2001	18	22	40	5
Clayton Zane	Australia	DF	1998–1999	25	5	30	3
Robert Enes	Australia	MF	1998–2002	70	11	81	2
Phil Moss	England	DF	1998–2000	20	17	37	1
Nick Purdue	Australia	DF	1998	1	0	1	0
James Stubbs-Mills	Australia	MF	1998–1999	0	4	4	0
Paul Wearne	Australia	DF	1998–2000	5	3	8	0
Matthew Langdon	Australia	MF	1998–2001	70	1	71	7
Adam Snyder	Australia	MF	1998–2000	1	10	11	0
Adem Poric	Australia	MF	1998	2	0	2	0
Gabriel Mendez	Australia	MF	1998–1999; 2000–2001	18	11	29	3
Jack Sobczyk	Australia	MF	1999–2002	22	9	31	0
Matthew Bingley	Australia	MF	1999–2001	60	0	60	6
Paul Foster	Australia	MF	1999	1	3	4	0
Anthony Faria	Australia	MF	1999–2000	4	3	7	0
David Seal	Australia	FW	1999–2000	17	3	20	9
Simon Catanzaro	Australia	FW	1999–2001	6	16	22	1
Sean Cranney	Australia	MF	1999–2000	9	2	11	1
Tony Perinich	Australia	FW	1999–2001	18	13	31	4
John Perosh	Australia	GK	1999–2000; 2000–2001	25	0	25	0
Abbas Saad	Australia	FW	1999–2000	8	5	13	0
Adam Griffiths	Australia	DF	1999–2000; 2002	14	7	21	1
Ryan Griffiths	Australia	FW	1999–2002	20	21	41	6
Dean Culina	Australia	DF	1999	2	1	3	0
Shane Lyons	Australia	MF	1999–2000	4	6	10	1
Michael Prentice	Australia	DF	2000	0	1	1	0
Nicola Berti	Italy	MF	2000	8	0	8	0
Jess Vanstrattan	Australia	GK	2000	3	0	3	0
Ben Burgess	Republic of Ireland	FW	2000–2001	27	0	27	16
Alex Moreira	Brazil	FW	2000–2001	14	6	20	5
Noel Spencer	Australia	MF	2001–2004	87	5	92	4
Scott Thomas	Australia	MF	2000–2002	35	2	37	2
Craig Foster	Australia	MF	2000–2002	40	3	43	2
Todd McRae	Australia	FW	2001	1	0	1	0
Mike Smith	Australia	DF	2001	9	0	9	0
Stuart Howson	Australia	MF	2001	14	0	14	1
Lee Feeney	Northern Ireland	MF	2001	2	1	3	0
Matthew Hunter	Australia	MF	2001; 2003–2004	10	4	14	0
Lupce Acevski	Australia	GK	2001–2002	11	0	11	0
Pablo Cardozo	Australia	FW	2001–2002	22	0	22	14
Michael Cartwright	Australia	DF	2001–2002	19	6	25	0
Adrian Cervinski	Australia	FW	2001–2002	19	1	20	5
John Hutchinson	Malta	MF	2001–2004	74	3	77	12
Andy McDermott	Australia	DF	2001–2003	41	6	47	6
Robert Trajanovski	Australia	DF	2001–2002	19	3	22	0
Julian Watts	England	DF	2001–2004	65	1	66	2
Simon Bell	Cameroon	DF	2001–2003	22	5	27	1
Marcus Stergiopoulos	Australia	MF	2002	6	1	7	0
Stephen Dobbie	Scotland	FW	2002	1	2	3	3
Jacob Rex	Australia	GK	2002	1	0	1	0
Ian Ferguson	Scotland	MF	2002–2004	44	1	45	3
Brent Fisher	New Zealand	FW	2002–2004	11	18	29	6
Alex Tobin	Australia	DF	2002–2004	36	2	38	0
Vuka Tomasevic	Australia	DF	2002–2004	47	4	51	9
Alex Wilkinson	Australia	DF	2002–2004	44	0	44	0
Jonti Richter	Australia	MF	2002–2004	28	16	44	7
Steven Baveas	Australia	MF	2002–2003	2	10	12	0
Sean Walsh	Australia	MF	2003	0	1	1	0
Dylan Macallister	Australia	FW	2003–2004	26	4	30	5
Bradley Groves	Australia	MF	2003	14	8	22	3
Stewart Petrie	Scotland	FW	2003–2004	37	0	37	10
Omar Obeid	Australia	MF	2003	0	5	5	0
Mark Milligan	Australia	DF	2003–2004	15	1	16	1
Andrew Mailer	Australia	MF	2003–2004	0	7	7	0
Michael Moulis	Australia	DF	2003–2004	0	2	2	0
Adam Kwasnik	Australia	FW	2003–2004	23	26	49	9
Wayne O'Sullivan	Republic of Ireland	MF	2003–2004	24	0	24	2
Caetano Lima	Brazil	MF	2004	0	3	3	0
Erik Paartalu	Australia	MF	2004	0	1	1	0
Stuart Page	Australia	GK	2004	1	1	2	0
