= 2002–03 Northern Spirit FC season =

Northern Spirit
2002–03 season
- Manager: Lawrie McKinna
- Stadium: North Sydney Oval; Brookvale Oval
- National Soccer League: 6th
- NSL Championship play-offs: 5th
- Top goalscorer: Vuko Tomasevic (8)
- Highest home attendance: 3,760 vs. Marconi Fairfield (7 March 2003); National Soccer League
- Lowest home attendance: 1,004 vs. Melbourne Knights (29 November 2002); National Soccer League
- Average home league attendance: 2,509
- Biggest win: 3–0 vs. Wollongong Wolves (9 February 2003); National Soccer League
- Biggest defeat: 0–6 vs. Adelaide Force (25 May 2003); NSL Championship play-offs

The 2002–03 season was the fifth season in the history of Northern Spirit (now North West Sydney Spirit). It was also the fifth season in the National Soccer League. Northern Spirit finished 6th in their National Soccer League regular season and 5th in the NSL Championship play-offs.

== Players ==
Note: Flags indicate national team as defined under FIFA eligibility rules; some limited exceptions apply. Players may hold more than one non-FIFA nationality.

No.	Pos.	Nation	Player
2	DF	ENG	Julian Watts
3	DF	CMR	Simon Bell
4	MF	AUS	Noel Spencer
5	DF	AUS	Alex Tobin
6	DF	AUS	Robert Trajkovski
7	DF	AUS	Andy McDermott
8	MF	SCO	Ian Ferguson
10	FW	AUS	Dylan Macallister
11	MF	AUS	Troy Cranney
12	MF	MLT	John Hutchinson
14	MF	AUS	Bradley Groves
15	DF	AUS	Vuko Tomasevic

No.	Pos.	Nation	Player
16	FW	NZL	Brent Fisher
17	FW	SCO	Stewart Petrie
18	DF	AUS	Alex Wilkinson
20	GK	AUS	Paul Henderson
21	MF	AUS	Sean Walsh
24	MF	AUS	Mitchell Prentice
27	MF	AUS	Jonti Richter
28	MF	AUS	Matthew Hunter
29	DF	AUS	Michael Moulis
31	MF	AUS	Andrew Mailer
32	FW	AUS	Adam Foti
33	DF	AUS	Mark Milligan

== Transfers ==
=== Transfers in ===
No.	Position	Player	Transferred from	Type/fee	Date	Ref
–	FW	(New Zealand) Aaron Burgess	(Australia) Manly Warringah Dolphins		July 2002	
–	FW	Adam Kwasnik	Parramatta Power		July 2002	
10	FW	Dylan Macallister	Sydney Olympic		July 2002	
–	MF	(England) Marc Phillips	(Malaysia) Brunei		July 2002	
–	FW	Hamilton Thorp	(Australia) Manly Warringah Dolphins		July 2002	
5	DF	Alex Tobin	Parramatta Power		July 2002	
15	DF	Vuko Tomasevic	(Australia) Bonnyrigg White Eagles		July 2002	
18	DF	Alex Wilkinson	(Australia) Manly Warringah Dolphins		July 2002	
–	FW	Russell Woodruffe	(Australia) Mt Gravatt Hawks		July 2002	
8	MF	(Scotland) Ian Ferguson	(Scotland) Dunfermline Athletic		August 2002	
17	FW	(Scotland) Stewart Petrie	(Scotland) Dunfermline Athletic		February 2003	
33	DF	Mark Milligan	(Australia) FFA Centre of Excellence		April 2003	

=== Transfers out ===
No.	Position	Player	Transferred to	Type/fee	Date	Ref
10	FW	Pablo Cardozo	Parramatta Power		June 2002	
16	FW	Simon Catanzaro	(Australia) Blacktown City		June 2002	
9	FW	Adrian Cervinski	Melbourne Knights		June 2002	
17	FW	(Scotland) Stephen Dobbie	(Scotland) Rangers		June 2002	
18	MF	Robert Enes	Marconi Fairfield		June 2002	
21	DF	Adam Griffiths	Newcastle United		June 2002	
13	MF	Marcus Stergiopoulos	(Australia) APIA Leichhardt		June 2002	
6	MF	Scott Thomas	Newcastle United		June 2002	
–	MF	James Wesolowski	(England) Leicester City		June 2002	
–	MF	(England) Marc Phillips	(Malaysia) Brunei		November 2002	
1	GK	Lupce Acevski	Adelaide City		December 2002	
–	FW	Hamilton Thorp	(Sweden) IFK Norrköping		December 2002	
23	MF	Steven Baveas	(Australia) Ryde City		March 2003	
–	FW	Russell Woodruffe	(Australia) Queensland Lions		March 2003	
30	GK	Jacob Rex	(Australia) Manly Warringah Dolphins		April 2003	
–	FW	Adam Kwasnik	(Australia) Manly Warringah Dolphins		May 2003	

== Competitions ==
=== Overview ===
Competition	First match	Last match	Starting round	Final position	Record							
Competition	First match	Last match	Starting round	Final position	Pld	W	D	L	GF	GA	GD	Win %
National Soccer League	21 September 2002	16 March 2003	Matchday 1	6th	24	11	3	10	37	44	−7	45.83
NSL Championship play-offs	22 March 2003	25 May 2003	Matchday 1	5th	9	2	2	5	7	22	−15	22.22
Total					33	13	5	15	44	66	−22	39.39

Last updated: complete
Source: Competitions

=== National Soccer League ===
==== League table ====
Pos	Team	Pld	W	D	L	GF	GA	GD	Pts	Qualification
4	Newcastle United	24	10	7	7	37	25	+12	37	Qualification for the Championship play-offs
5	Adelaide Force	24	11	4	9	40	34	+6	37	Qualification for the Championship play-offs
6	Northern Spirit	24	11	3	10	37	44	−7	36	Qualification for the Championship play-offs
7	South Melbourne	24	10	5	9	36	37	−1	35	
8	Sydney United	24	7	6	11	23	31	−8	27	

Source: rsssf.com
Rules for classification: 1) Points; 2) Goal difference; 3) Goals scored

==== Results summary ====
Overall								Home						Away					
Pld	W	D	L	GF	GA	GD	Pts	W	D	L	GF	GA	GD	W	D	L	GF	GA	GD
24	11	3	10	37	44	−7	36	6	1	5	21	21	0	5	2	5	16	23	−7

Source: worldfootball.net

==== Results by round ====
Round	1	2	3	4	5	6	7	8	9	10	11	12	13	14	15	16	17	18	19	20	21	22	23	24	25	26
Ground	A	H	A	H	A	B	H	A	H	A	H	A	H	A	H	H	A	H	B	A	H	A	H	A	H	A
Result	W	L	L	W	D	✖	L	L	L	D	W	W	W	W	L	D	L	W	✖	L	W	W	L	W	W	L
Position	3	7	10	5	4	8	11	12	12	12	10	10	5	5	5	6	6	5	7	7	7	6	6	6	6	6

Source: worldfootball.net
A = Away; H = Home; W = Win; D = Draw; L = Loss

==== Matches ====
21 September 2002 1	Brisbane Strikers	1–2	Northern Spirit	Brisbane
	Grierson 42'	Report	Tomasevic 20'; Hutchinson 57'	Stadium: Ballymore Stadium; Attendance: 2,103; Referee: Peter Green

27 September 2002 2	Northern Spirit	1–4	Football Kingz	Sydney
	Tomasevic 90' (pen.)	Report	Ngata 3', 18', 83' (pen.), 87'	Stadium: North Sydney Oval; Attendance: 3,289; Referee: Angelo Nardi

4 October 2002 3	Newcastle United	5–0	Northern Spirit	Newcastle
	J. Griffiths 23', 32', 67'; Thomas 45'; Moreira 76'	Report		Stadium: EnergyAustralia Stadium; Attendance: 5,219; Referee: Matthew Breeze

12 October 2002 4	Northern Spirit	3–2	South Melbourne	Sydney
	Spencer 16'; Hutchinson 37'; Richter 88'	Report	Kisnorbo 62'; Buljan 85'	Stadium: Brookvale Oval; Attendance: 2,823; Referee: Simon Micallef

20 October 2002 5	Sydney United	1–1	Northern Spirit	Sydney
	Menapi 38'	Report	McDermott 43'	Stadium: Sydney United Sports Centre; Attendance: 5,352; Referee: Con Diomis

1 November 2002 7	Northern Spirit	1–3	Perth Glory	Sydney
	Fisher 55'	Report	Hassell 26'; Miller 62'; Mori 90+1'	Stadium: North Sydney Oval; Attendance: 2,918; Referee: Craig Zetter

10 November 2002 8	Wollongong Wolves	2–1	Northern Spirit	Wollongong
	Babic 35'; Young 62'	Report	Hutchinson 55'	Stadium: WIN Stadium; Attendance: 2,925; Referee: Simon Micallef

15 November 2002 9	Northern Spirit	2–3	Olympic Sharks	Sydney
	Tomasevic 77', 90+2'	Report	Watts 2' (o.g.); Porter 17'; Pondeljak 68'	Stadium: North Sydney Oval; Attendance: 2,795; Referee: Matthew Breeze

24 November 2002 10	Adelaide Force	1–1	Northern Spirit	Adelaide
	Valkanis 83'	Report	Hutchinson 89'	Stadium: Hindmarsh Stadium; Attendance: 1,897; Referee: Con Diomis

29 November 2002 11	Northern Spirit	2–1	Melbourne Knights	Sydney
	Kwasnik 18'; Richter 65'	Report	Biscayzacu 87'	Stadium: North Sydney Oval; Attendance: 1,004; Referee: Brett Hugo

27 December 2002 15	Northern Spirit	2–3	Brisbane Strikers	Sydney
	Hutchinson 55'; Fisher 90+4'	Report	Roche 36'; Grierson 6', 60'	Stadium: North Sydney Oval; Attendance: 1,455; Referee: Perry Mur

5 January 2003 16	Northern Spirit	0–0	Newcastle United	Brookvale
		Report		Stadium: Brookvale Oval; Attendance: 1,685; Referee: Con Diomis

12 January 2003 17	South Melbourne	1–0	Northern Spirit	Melbourne
	Damianos 5'	Report		Stadium: Bob Jane Stadium; Attendance: 5,080; Referee: Perry Mur

17 January 2003 18	Northern Spirit	1–0	Sydney United	Sydney
	Spencer 70'	Report		Stadium: North Sydney Oval; Attendance: 2,016; Referee: Craig Zetter

20 January 2003 12	Marconi Fairfield	0–1	Northern Spirit	Sydney
		Report	Tomasevic 61' (pen.)	Stadium: Marconi Stadium; Attendance: 2,199; Referee: Senko Rastocic

1 February 2003 20	Perth Glory	3–0	Northern Spirit	Perth
	Mori 22', 59'; Caceres 84'	Report		Stadium: Perth Oval; Attendance: 9,979; Referee: Brett Hugo

4 February 2003 13	Northern Spirit	2–1	Parramatta Power	Sydney
	Kwasnik 19'; Tomasevic 49' (pen.)	Report	Cardozo 68'	Stadium: North Sydney Oval; Attendance: 1,830; Referee: Ben Williams

9 February 2003 21	Northern Spirit	3–0	Wollongong Wolves	Sydney
	Groves 20'; Petrie 79'; McDermott 85'	Report		Stadium: Brookvale Oval; Attendance: 3,114; Referee: Simon Micallef

16 February 2003 22	Olympic Sharks	2–3	Northern Spirit	Sydney
	Milicic 48' (pen.); Parisi 85'	Report		Stadium: Toyota Park; Attendance: 2,813; Referee: Craig Zetter

21 February 2003 23	Northern Spirit	2–3	Adelaide Force	Sydney
	Groves 13'; Fisher 87'	Report	Tunbridge 51'; Pelosi 67', 76'	Stadium: North Sydney Oval; Attendance: 1,830; Referee: Brett Hugo

27 February 2003 14	Football Kingz	1–3	Northern Spirit	Auckland
	Beldham 81'	Report	Fisher 9'; Petrie 50'; Kwasnik 67'	Stadium: Ericsson Stadium; Attendance: 1,057; Referee: Neil Fox

2 March 2003 24	Melbourne Knights	1–3	Northern Spirit	Melbourne
	Erdogan 57'	Report	Spencer 1'; Fisher 11'; Tomasevic 66' (pen.)	Stadium: Knights Stadium; Attendance: 3,421; Referee: Simon Micallef

7 March 2003 25	Northern Spirit	2–1	Marconi Fairfield	Sydney
	McDermott 66'; Ferguson 71'	Report	Last 70'	Stadium: North Sydney Oval; Attendance: 3,760; Referee: Brett Hugo

16 March 2003 26	Parramatta Power	5–1	Northern Spirit	Sydney
	Elrich 9', 11', 50'; Maloney 61'; Buonavoglia 76'	Report	Petrie 23'	Stadium: Parramatta Stadium; Attendance: 3,128; Referee: Eddie Lennie

==== Championship play-offs ====
Pos	Team	Pld	W	D	L	GF	GA	GD	Pts	Qualification
1	Perth Glory (C)	10	8	0	2	27	7	+20	27 (Note: Awarded 3 bonus points, due to regular season position.)	Qualification for the Grand Final
2	Olympic Sharks	10	4	1	5	17	14	+3	19 (Note: Awarded 6 bonus points, due to regular season position.)	Qualification for the Grand Final
3	Adelaide Force (R)	10	5	2	3	19	14	+5	17	Joined the SASF Premier League (Note: Adelaide Force was not forcibly relegated, but voluntarily left the league due to financial difficulties.)
4	Parramatta Power	10	3	4	3	16	21	−5	13	
5	Northern Spirit	9	2	2	5	7	22	−15	8 (Note: The Round 9 match between Northern Spirit and Newcastle United was not played, as neither team could progress.)	
6	Newcastle United	9	2	1	6	9	17	−8	7	

Source: rsssf.com
Rules for classification: 1) Points; 2) Goal difference; 3) Goals scored
(C) Champions; (R) Relegated
Notes:

22 March 2003 1	Perth Glory	5–0	Northern Spirit	Perth
	Despotovski 30', 36', 43', 87'; Caceres 81'	Report		Stadium: Perth Oval; Attendance: 6,347; Referee: Matthew Breeze

30 March 2003 2	Olympic Sharks	1–3	Northern Spirit	Sydney
	Parisi 13'	Report	Spencer 31'; Hutchinson 36'; Macallister 78'	Stadium: Toyota Park; Attendance: 3,513; Referee: Mark Shield

5 April 2003 3	Northern Spirit	1–0	Parramatta Power	Sydney
	Tomasevic 25'	Report		Stadium: North Sydney Oval; Attendance: 2,691; Referee: Eddie Lennie

13 April 2003 4	Newcastle United	0–0	Northern Spirit	Newcastle
		Report		Stadium: EnergyAustralia Stadium; Attendance: 2,001; Referee: Matthew Breeze

18 April 2003 5	Northern Spirit	1–2	Adelaide Force	Sydney
	Hutchinson 47'	Report	Pelosi 66'; Watts 88' (o.g.)	Stadium: North Sydney Oval; Attendance: 2,530; Referee: Con Diomis

25 April 2003 6	Northern Spirit	0–3	Perth Glory	Sydney
		Report	Mori 12'; Gumprecht 57'; Despotovski 79'	Stadium: North Sydney Oval; Attendance: 3,088; Referee: Matthew Breeze

4 May 2003 7	Northern Spirit	0–3	Olympic Sharks	Sydney
		Report	Milicic 38'; Porter 54', 59'	Stadium: Brookvale Oval; Attendance: 3,318; Referee: Simon Micallef

11 May 2003 8	Parrmatta Power	2–2	Northern Spirit	Sydney
	Cardozo 7'; O'Grady 43'	Report	Groves 82'; McDermott 90+3'	Stadium: Parramatta Stadium; Attendance: 2,460; Referee: Mark Shield

16 May 2003 9	Northern Spirit	Cancelled	Newcastle United	Sydney
		Report		Stadium: North Sydney Oval
Note: This match was postponed due to heavy rainfalls in Sydney and to be rescheduled at Rat Park, but was cancelled later.

25 May 2003 10	Adelaide Force	6–0	Northern Spirit	Adelaide
	Pantelis 25'; Smeltz 42'; Tunbridge 49', 58'; Fyfe 67', 90'	Report		Stadium: Hindmarsh Stadium; Attendance: 3,833; Referee: Matthew Breeze

== Statistics ==
=== Appearances and goals ===
Players with no appearances not included in the list.

No.	Pos.	Nat.	Name	National Soccer League		Total	
No.	Pos.	Nat.	Name	Apps	Goals	Apps	Goals
2	DF	(England)	Julian Watts	30	0	30	0
3	DF	(Cameroon)	Simon Bell	5(2)	0	7	0
4	MF	(Australia)	Noel Spencer	30	4	30	4
5	DF	(Australia)	Alex Tobin	32	0	32	0
6	DF	(Australia)	Robert Trajkovski	1(2)	0	3	0
7	DF	(Australia)	Andy McDermott	26(2)	5	28	5
8	MF	(Scotland)	Ian Ferguson	26(1)	1	27	1
10	FW	(Australia)	Dylan Macallister	13(4)	1	17	1
11	MF	(Australia)	Troy Cranney	0	0	0	0
12	MF	(Malta)	John Hutchinson	32	7	32	7
14	MF	(Australia)	Bradley Groves	7(7)	3	14	3
15	DF	(Australia)	Vuko Tomasevic	28(1)	8	29	8
16	FW	(New Zealand)	Brent Fisher	7(10)	5	17	5
17	FW	(Scotland)	Stewart Petrie	17	3	17	3
18	DF	(Australia)	Alex Wilkinson	29(1)	0	30	0
20	GK	(Australia)	Paul Henderson	32	0	32	0
21	MF	(Australia)	Sean Walsh	0(1)	0	1	0
22	MF	(Australia)	Matthew Osman	5(7)	0	12	0
25	MF	(Australia)	Omar Obeid	0(3)	0	3	0
27	MF	(Australia)	Jonti Richter	14(15)	2	29	2
28	MF	(Australia)	Matthew Hunter	1	0	1	0
29	DF	(Australia)	Michael Moulis	0(1)	0	1	0
31	MF	(Australia)	Andrew Mailer	0(1)	0	1	0
33	DF	(Australia)	Mark Milligan	1(1)	0	2	0

=== Clean sheets ===
Rank	No.	Pos	Nat	Name	National Soccer League	Total
1	20	GK	(Australia)	Paul Henderson	6	6
Total					6	6
