= 2001–02 Northern Spirit FC season =

Northern Spirit
2001–02 season
- Stadium: North Sydney Oval
- National Soccer League: 8th
- Top goalscorer: Pablo Cardozo (14)
- Highest home attendance: 9,687 vs. Olympic Sharks (26 October 2001); National Soccer League
- Lowest home attendance: 2,808 vs. Brisbane Strikers (8 February 2002); National Soccer League
- Average home league attendance: 4,749
- Biggest win: 5–2 vs. Wollongong Wolves (7 April 2002); National Soccer League
- Biggest defeat: 0–3 (twice)

The 2001–02 season was the fourth season in the history of Northern Spirit (now North West Sydney Spirit). It was also the fourth season in the National Soccer League. Northern Spirit finished 8th in their National Soccer League season.

== Players ==
Note: Flags indicate national team as defined under FIFA eligibility rules; some limited exceptions apply. Players may hold more than one non-FIFA nationality.

No.	Pos.	Nation	Player
1	GK	AUS	Lupce Acevski
2	DF	ENG	Julian Watts
3	DF	CMR	Simon Bell
4	MF	AUS	Noel Spencer
5	DF	AUS	Robert Trajkovski
6	MF	AUS	Scott Thomas
7	DF	AUS	Andy McDermott
8	MF	AUS	Craig Foster
9	FW	AUS	Adrian Cervinski
10	FW	AUS	Pablo Cardozo
11	MF	AUS	Troy Cranney
12	MF	MLT	John Hutchinson
13	MF	AUS	Marcus Stergiopoulos
14	DF	AUS	Michael Cartwright

No.	Pos.	Nation	Player
16	FW	AUS	Simon Catanzaro
17	FW	SCO	Stephen Dobbie
18	MF	AUS	Robert Enes
20	GK	AUS	Paul Henderson
21	DF	AUS	Adam Griffiths
23	MF	AUS	Steven Baveas
24	MF	AUS	Mitchell Prentice
27	FW	NZL	Brent Fisher
28	MF	AUS	Matthew Hunter
30	GK	AUS	Jacob Rex
—	FW	AUS	Ryan Griffiths
—	MF	AUS	Gabriel Mendez
—	MF	AUS	James Wesolowski

== Transfers ==
=== Transfers in ===
No.	Position	Player	Transferred from	Type/fee	Date	Ref
1	GK	Lupce Acevski	Melbourne Knights		July 2001	
3	DF	(Cameroon) Simon Bell	Marconi Fairfield		July 2001	
—	FW	(New Zealand) Aaron Burgess	(New Zealand) Dunedin Technical		July 2001	
14	DF	Michael Cartwright	Football Kingz		July 2001	
9	FW	Adrian Cervinski	Melbourne Knights		July 2001	
21	DF	Adam Griffiths	(Australia) Manly Warringah Dolphins		July 2001	
7	DF	Andy McDermott	(England) Notts County		July 2001	
24	MF	Mitchell Prentice	(Australia) FFA Centre of Excellence		July 2001	
5	DF	Robert Trajkovski	Perth Glory		July 2001	
2	DF	(England) Julian Watts	(England) Luton Town		July 2001	
23	MF	Steven Baveas	Blacktown City		January 2002	
13	MF	Marcus Stergiopoulos	Sydney United		January 2002	

=== Transfers out ===
No.	Position	Player	Transferred to	Type/fee	Date	Ref
—	FW	(Brazil) Alex Moreira	Adelaide City		June 2001	
—	MF	Matthew Bingley	Newcastle United		June 2001	
—	DF	Michael Cunico	Sydney United		June 2001	
—	MF	(England) Stuart Howson	(England) Blackburn Rovers		June 2001	
—	MF	Matthew Langdon	Parramatta Power		June 2001	
—	FW	Todd McRae	(Australia) Bonnyrigg White Eagles		June 2001	
—	GK	John Perosh	Sydney United		June 2001	
—	DF	Joey Schirripa	Newcastle United		June 2001	
—	FW	Daniel Watkins	Sydney United		June 2001	
15	FW	Tony Perinich	Wollongong Wolves		October 2001	
17	MF	Gabriel Mendez	Sydney United		December 2001	
—	MF	Robbie Slater	(Australia) Manly Warringah Dolphins		February 2002	
—	FW	(New Zealand) Aaron Burgess	(Australia) Manly Warringah Dolphins		March 2002	
22	MF	Jacek Soczyk	(Australia) Fraser Park		March 2002	
—	DF	Alex Wilkinson	(Australia) Manly Warringah Dolphins		March 2002	

== Competitions ==
=== Overview ===
Competition	First match	Last match	Starting round	Final position	Record							
Competition	First match	Last match	Starting round	Final position	Pld	W	D	L	GF	GA	GD	Win %
National Soccer League	15 October 2000	29 April 2001	Matchday 1	13th	30	8	8	14	39	50	−11	26.67
Total					30	8	8	14	39	50	−11	26.67

Last updated: complete
Source: Competitions

=== National Soccer League ===
==== League table ====
Pos	Team	Pld	W	D	L	GF	GA	GD	Pts	Qualification
6	Melbourne Knights	24	11	3	10	41	40	+1	36	Qualification for the Finals series
7	Parramatta Power	24	10	4	10	34	30	+4	34	
8	Northern Spirit	24	9	7	8	36	39	−3	34	
9	Marconi Fairfield	24	8	6	10	33	36	−3	30	
10	Wollongong Wolves	24	6	7	11	28	43	−15	25	

Source: rsssf.com
Rules for classification: 1) Points; 2) Goal difference; 3) Goals scored

==== Results summary ====
Overall								Home						Away					
Pld	W	D	L	GF	GA	GD	Pts	W	D	L	GF	GA	GD	W	D	L	GF	GA	GD
24	9	7	8	36	39	−3	34	6	2	4	19	19	0	3	5	4	17	20	−3

Source: worldfootball.net

==== Results by round ====
Round	1	2	3	4	5	6	7	8	9	10	11	12	13	14	15	16	17	18	19	20	21	22	23	24	25	26
Ground	A	H	A	H	A	H	A	H	A	H	B	H	A	H	A	H	A	H	A	H	A	H	A	B	A	H
Result	W	D	D	L	D	W	W	L	W	L	✖	L	L	W	D	W	L	D	L	W	L	W	D	✖	D	W
Position	1	3	3	7	7	4	4	5	4	4	5	8	8	8	6	5	7	6	7	6	6	6	7	8	8	8

Source: worldfootball.net
A = Away; H = Home; W = Win; D = Draw; L = Loss

==== Matches ====
6 October 2001 1	Parramatta Power	1–3	Northern Spirit	Sydney
	Orlic 66'	Report	Cardozo 8'; Hutchinson 44'; Watts 49'	Stadium: Parramatta Stadium; Attendance: 5,012; Referee: Mark Shield

12 October 2001 2	Northern Spirit	1–1	Newcastle United	Sydney
	Hutchinson 49'	Report	Baillie 85'	Stadium: North Sydney Oval; Attendance: 8,902; Referee: Con Diomis

19 October 2001 3	Adelaide Force	2–2	Northern Spirit	Adelaide
	Tunbridge 6'; Fyfe 38'	Report	Enes 31'; Cardozo 54'	Stadium: Hindmarsh Stadium; Attendance: 3,310; Referee: Angelo Nardi

26 October 2001 4	Northern Spirit	0–3	Olympic Sharks	Sydney
		Report	Harris 51'; Carle 55'; Pondeljak 62'	Stadium: North Sydney Oval; Attendance: 9,687; Referee: Simon Micallef

3 November 2001 5	Brisbane Strikers	1–1	Northern Spirit	Brisbane
	Foster 56'	Report	Cardozo 46'	Stadium: Ballymore Stadium; Attendance: 4,950; Referee: Mark Shield

9 November 2001 6	Northern Spirit	1–0	South Melbourne	Sydney
	Cardozo 62'	Report		Stadium: North Sydney Oval; Attendance: 4,873; Referee: Peter Green

17 November 2001 7	Marconi Fairfield	0–2	Northern Spirit	Sydney
		Report	Bell 78'; Hutchinson 83'	Stadium: Marconi Stadium; Attendance: 4,763; Referee: Gerry Connolly

23 November 2001 8	Northern Spirit	0–2	Perth Glory	Sydney
		Report	Maloney 12'; Despotovski 44'	Stadium: North Sydney Oval; Attendance: 7,580; Referee: Simon Micallef

30 November 2001 9	Football Kingz	2–3	Northern Spirit	Auckland
	Goutzioulis 64'; Urlovic 69'	Report	Cardozo 48'; Griffiths 80', 83'	Stadium: Ericsson Stadium; Attendance: 4,323; Referee: Mark Shield

7 December 2001 10	Northern Spirit	1–2	Sydney United	Sydney
	Cardozo 53'	Report	Milicic 16'; Menapi 90+2'	Stadium: North Sydney Oval; Attendance: 4,605; Referee: Brett Hugo

21 December 2001 12	Northern Spirit	3–5	Melbourne Knights	Sydney
	Cervinski 25'; McDermott 37'; Burgess 85'	Report	Porter 14', 32', 38'; Vargas 60'; de Jesus 82' (Pen.)	Stadium: North Sydney Oval; Attendance: 3,077; Referee: Con Diomis

4 January 2002 13	Wollongong Wolves	2–1	Northern Spirit	Wollongong
	Sekulovski 19'; Young 81'	Report	Cardozo 28'	Stadium: WIN Stadium; Attendance: 4,018; Referee: Brett Hugo

11 January 2002 14	Northern Spirit	1–0	Parramatta Power	Sydney
	Cervinski 41'	Report		Stadium: North Sydney Oval; Attendance: 3,413; Referee: Matthew Breeze

18 January 2002 15	Newcastle United	1–1	Northern Spirit	Newcastle
	McBreen 81'	Report	Cervinski 23'	Stadium: EnergyAustralia Stadium; Attendance: 10,102; Referee: Brett Hugo

25 January 2002 16	Northern Spirit	1–0	Adelaide Force	Sydney
	Watts 30'	Report		Stadium: North Sydney Oval; Attendance: 2,852; Referee: Mark Shield

3 February 2002 17	Olympic Sharks	3–0	Northern Spirit	Sydney
	Milicic 50'; Pondeljak 76'; Packer 87'	Report		Stadium: Toyota Park; Attendance: 6,124; Referee: Eddie Lennie

8 February 2002 18	Northern Spirit	2–2	Brisbane Strikers	Sydney
	Thomas 2'; Cervinski 75'	Report	Grierson 44'; Baird 83'	Stadium: North Sydney Oval; Attendance: 2,808; Referee: Perry Mur

15 February 2002 19	South Melbourne	2–1	Northern Spirit	Melbourne
	Trimboli 49'; Buljan 83'	Report	Cardozo 59' (pen.)	Stadium: Bob Jane Stadium; Attendance: 4,256; Referee: Peter Green

22 February 2002 20	Northern Spirit	2–1	Marconi Fairfield	Sydney
	Cardozo 57', 75' (pen.)	Report	Maisano 90+1'	Stadium: North Sydney Oval; Attendance: 3,051; Referee: Simon Micallef

2 March 2002 21	Perth Glory	3–0	Northern Spirit	Perth
	Mori 1', 64'; Despotovski 68' (pen.)	Report		Stadium: Perth Oval; Attendance: 11,229; Referee: Eddie Lennie

8 March 2002 22	Northern Spirit	2–1	Football Kingz	Sydney
	Cervinski 8'; Cardozo 76'	Report	Vlahos 76'	Stadium: North Sydney Oval; Attendance: 3,224; Referee: Con Diomis

17 March 2002 23	Sydney United	1–1	Northern Spirit	Sydney
	Mendez 76'	Report	Cardozo 37'	Stadium: Sydney United Sports Centre; Attendance: 2,280; Referee: Mark Shield

30 March 2002 25	Melbourne Knights	2–2	Northern Spirit	Melbourne
	Da Costa 43'; Marusic 61'	Report	Dobbie 66', 73'	Stadium: Knights Stadium; Attendance: 4,262; Referee: Brett Hugo

7 April 2002 26	Northern Spirit	5–2	Wollongong Wolves	Sydney
	Dobbie 14'; Griffiths 32'; Cardozo 45', 89'; Thomas 69'	Report	Young 18'; Reid 33'	Stadium: North Sydney Oval; Attendance: 2,925; Referee: Brett Hugo

== Statistics ==
=== Appearances and goals ===
Players with no appearances not included in the list.

No.	Pos.	Nat.	Name	National Soccer League		Total	
No.	Pos.	Nat.	Name	Apps	Goals	Apps	Goals
1	GK	(Australia)	Lupce Acevski	11	0	11	0
2	DF	(England)	Julian Watts	20	2	20	2
3	DF	(Cameroon)	Simon Bell	17(3)	1	20	1
4	MF	(Australia)	Noel Spencer	20(2)	0	22	0
5	DF	(Australia)	Robert Trajanovski	18(1)	0	19	0
6	MF	(Australia)	Scott Thomas	15(1)	2	16	2
7	DF	(Australia)	Andy McDermott	15(4)	1	19	1
8	MF	(Australia)	Craig Foster	21(1)	0	22	0
9	FW	(Australia)	Adrian Cervinski	19(1)	5	20	5
10	FW	(Australia)	Pablo Cardozo	22	14	22	14
11	MF	(Australia)	Troy Cranney	6(3)	0	9	0
12	MF	(Malta)	John Hutchinson	18(3)	3	21	3
13	MF	(Australia)	Marcus Stergiopoulos	6(1)	0	7	0
14	DF	(Australia)	Michael Cartwright	19(2)	0	21	0
17	FW	(Scotland)	Stephen Dobbie	1(2)	3	3	3
18	MF	(Australia)	Robert Enes	14(3)	1	17	1
20	GK	(Australia)	Paul Henderson	12(1)	0	13	0
21	DF	(Australia)	Adam Griffiths	2(3)	1	5	1
30	GK	(Australia)	Jacob Rex	1	0	1	0
—	FW	(Australia)	Ryan Griffiths	6(11)	2	17	2
—	MF	(Australia)	Gabriel Mendez	0(2)	0	2	0

=== Clean sheets ===
Rank	No.	Pos	Nat	Name	National Soccer League	Total
1	20	GK	(Australia)	Paul Henderson	4	4
Total					4	4
