= 2000–01 Northern Spirit FC season =

Northern Spirit
2000–01 season
- Stadium: North Sydney Oval; North Power Stadium
- National Soccer League: 13th
- Top goalscorer: David Seal (9)
- Highest home attendance: 10,254 vs. Sydney Olympic (15 October 2000); National Soccer League
- Lowest home attendance: 2,108 vs. Adelaide Force (4 March 2001); National Soccer League
- Average home league attendance: 4,526
- Biggest win: 2–0 (twice); 4–2 (twice)
- Biggest defeat: 2–6 vs. South Melbourne (29 April 2001); National Soccer League

The 2000–01 season was the third season in the history of Northern Spirit (now North West Sydney Spirit). It was also the third season in the National Soccer League. Northern Spirit finished 13th in their National Soccer League season.

== Players ==
Note: Flags indicate national team as defined under FIFA eligibility rules; some limited exceptions apply. Players may hold more than one non-FIFA nationality.

No.	Pos.	Nation	Player
—	FW	AUS	Graham Arnold
—	MF	AUS	Paul Bilokapic
—	MF	AUS	Matthew Bingley
—	FW	IRL	Ben Burgess
—	FW	AUS	Simon Catanzaro
—	MF	AUS	Troy Cranney
—	DF	AUS	Michael Cunico
—	MF	AUS	Robert Enes
—	MF	NIR	Lee Feeney
—	MF	AUS	Craig Foster
—	FW	AUS	Ryan Griffiths
—	GK	AUS	Paul Henderson
—	MF	ENG	Stuart Howson

No.	Pos.	Nation	Player
—	MF	AUS	Matthew Hunter
—	MF	AUS	Matthew Langdon
—	FW	AUS	Todd MacRae
—	MF	AUS	Gabriel Mendez
—	FW	BRA	Alex Moreira
—	FW	AUS	Tony Perinich
—	GK	AUS	John Perosh
—	MF	AUS	Robbie Slater
—	DF	AUS	Mike Smith
—	MF	AUS	Jacek Sobczyk
—	MF	AUS	Noel Spencer
—	MF	AUS	Scott Thomas
—	FW	AUS	Daniel Watkins

== Transfers ==
=== Transfers in ===
No.	Position	Player	Transferred from	Type/fee	Date	Ref
—	FW	(Brazil) Alex Moreira	Carlton		July 2000	
—	MF	Craig Foster	(England) Crystal Palace		July 2000	
—	MF	Gabriel Mendez	Sydney Olympic		July 2000	
—	GK	John Perosh	Sydney Olympic		July 2000	
—	DF	Mike Smith	Marconi Fairfield		July 2000	
—	MF	Noel Spencer	Wollongong Wolves		July 2000	
—	MF	Scott Thomas	Sydney Olympic		July 2000	
—	FW	Daniel Watkins	Canberra Cosmos		July 2000	
—	FW	(England) Phil Moss	(Australia) Fraser Park		September 2000	
—	FW	(Republic of Ireland) Ben Burgess	(England) Blackburn Rovers		October 2000	
—	MF	(Northern Ireland) Lee Feeney	(Scotland) Rangers		January 2001	
—	DF	Adam Griffiths	Eastern Pride		January 2001	
—	MF	(England) Stuart Howson	(England) Blackburn Rovers		February 2001	

=== Transfers out ===
No.	Position	Player	Transferred to	Type/fee	Date	Ref
—	DF	Michael Prentice	Newcastle United		June 2000	
—	DF	Marko Rudan	(Germany) Alemannia Aachen		June 2000	
—	FW	Abbas Saad	(Australia) Canterbury Bankstown		June 2000	
—	DF	Paul Wearne	Eastern Pride		June 2000	
—	DF	Adam Griffiths	Eastern Pride		October 2000	
—	FW	Daniel Watkins	Eastern Pride		November 2000	
—	GK	Jess Vanstrattan	(Italy) Hellas Verona		December 2000	
—	MF	Paul Bilokapic	Sydney United		January 2001	
—	MF	Anthony Faria	(Australia) Manly Warringah Dolphins		March 2001	
—	MF	Adam Snyder	(Australia) Manly Warringah Dolphins		April 2001	

== Competitions ==
=== Overview ===
Competition	First match	Last match	Starting round	Final position	Record							
Competition	First match	Last match	Starting round	Final position	Pld	W	D	L	GF	GA	GD	Win %
National Soccer League	15 October 2000	29 April 2001	Matchday 1	13th	30	8	8	14	39	50	−11	26.67
Total					30	8	8	14	39	50	−11	26.67

Last updated: complete
Source: Competitions

=== National Soccer League ===
==== League table ====
Pos	Team	Pld	W	D	L	GF	GA	GD	Pts
11	Canberra Cosmos	30	11	4	15	49	55	−6	37
12	Brisbane Strikers	30	9	8	13	52	56	−4	35
13	Northern Spirit	30	8	8	14	39	50	−11	32
14	Newcastle United	30	7	9	14	37	56	−19	30
15	Eastern Pride	30	5	5	20	32	61	−29	0 (Note: Eastern Pride were stripped of all their points following a breach of regulations.)

Source: rsssf.com
Rules for classification: 1) Points; 2) Goal difference; 3) Goals scored

==== Results summary ====
Overall								Home						Away					
Pld	W	D	L	GF	GA	GD	Pts	W	D	L	GF	GA	GD	W	D	L	GF	GA	GD
30	8	8	14	39	50	−11	32	4	4	7	15	20	−5	4	4	7	24	30	−6

Source: worldfootball.net

==== Results by round ====
Round	1	2	3	4	5	6	7	8	9	10	11	12	13	14	15	16	17	18	19	20	21	22	23	24	25	26	27	28	29	30
Ground	A	H	A	H	H	A	H	A	H	A	H	A	H	A	H	H	A	H	A	A	H	A	H	A	H	A	H	A	H	A
Result	L	D	W	W	D	L	W	W	D	D	W	L	L	D	L	L	L	L	W	W	L	L	W	D	L	D	D	L	L	L
Position	11	12	9	6	6	9	6	4	5	5	5	6	8	8	9	11	12	12	10	10	10	13	10	11	11	12	12	12	13	13

Source: worldfootball.net
A = Away; H = Home; W = Win; D = Draw; L = Loss

==== Matches ====
15 October 2000 1	Sydney United	2–1	Northern Spirit	Sydney
	Arambasic 73', 88'	Report	Langdon 5'	Stadium: Sydney United Sports Centre; Attendance: 4,958; Referee: Craig Zetter

20 October 2000 2	Northern Spirit	0–0	Sydney Olympic	Sydney
		Report		Stadium: North Sydney Oval; Attendance: 10,254; Referee: Con Diomis

28 October 2000 3	Eastern Pride	0–2	Northern Spirit	Morwell
		Report	Mendez 30' (pen.); Moreira 37'	Stadium: Mobil Park; Attendance: 1,653; Referee: Jeremy Blaney

3 November 2000 4	Northern Spirit	4–2	Football Kingz	Sydney
	Burgess 23', 30', 35'; Mendez 65' (pen.)	Report	Vicelich 41'; Ngata 76' (pen.)	Stadium: North Sydney Oval; Attendance: 4,294; Referee: Matthew Breeze

11 November 2000 5	Northern Spirit	0–0	Newcastle United	Gosford
		Report		Stadium: North Power Stadium; Attendance: 6,312; Referee: Perry Mur

17 November 2000 6	Adelaide Force	3–2	Northern Spirit	Adelaide
	Brain 6'; Tunbridge 51'; Karlovic 65'	Report	Catanzaro 40'; Burgess 42'	Stadium: Hindmarsh Stadium; Attendance: 3,661; Referee: Brett Hugo

24 November 2000 7	Northern Spirit	2–0	Perth Glory	Sydney
	Moreira 25'; Burgess 58'	Report		Stadium: North Sydney Oval; Attendance: 5,764; Referee: Mark Shield

3 December 2000 8	Carlton	0–3 (Note: Awarded score. Original score 1–1; result was changed after Carlton abandoned the 2000–01 National Soccer League season after eight rounds.)	Northern Spirit	Melbourne
	Marth 44'	Report	Moreira 55'	Stadium: Epping Stadium; Attendance: 3,109; Referee: Brett Hugo

8 December 2000 9	Northern Spirit	0–0	Marconi Fairfield	Sydney
		Report		Stadium: North Sydney Oval; Attendance: 6,251; Referee: Jeremy Blaney

17 December 2000 10	Melbourne Knights	1–1	Northern Spirit	Melbourne
	Porter 65'	Report	Burgess 48'	Stadium: Knights Stadium; Attendance: 4,320; Referee: Eddie Lennie

22 December 2000 11	Northern Spirit	1–0	Brisbane Strikers	Sydney
	Burgess 59'	Report		Stadium: North Sydney Oval; Attendance: 3,758; Referee: Brett Hugo

29 December 2000 12	Parramatta Power	3–0	Northern Spirit	Sydney
	Brown 63'; Lee 69'; Miller 74'	Report		Stadium: Parrmatta Stadium; Attendance: 8,176; Referee: Con Diomis

6 January 2001 13	Northern Spirit	0–2	Canberra Cosmos	Gosford
		Report	Angelucci 23'; Hagger 89'	Stadium: North Power Stadium; Attendance: 4,688; Referee: Angelo Nardi

27 February 2001 14	Wollongong Wolves	2–2	Northern Spirit	Wollongong
	Harries 37'; Young 38'	Report	Burgess 27' (pen.); Langdon 88'	Stadium: WIN Stadium; Attendance: 5,575; Referee: Matthew Breeze

19 January 2001 15	Northern Spirit	1–2	South Melbourne	Sydney
	Burgess 46'	Report	Coveny 47'; Kalogeracos 67'	Stadium: North Sydney Oval; Attendance: 5,057; Referee: Perry Mur

26 January 2001 16	Northern Spirit	1–2	Sydney United	Sydney
	Burgess 27'	Report	Arambasic 35'; Burt 55'	Stadium: North Sydney Oval; Attendance: 3,731; Referee: Simon Micallef

4 February 2001 17	Sydney Olympic	2–1	Northern Spirit	Sydney
	Macallister 30'; Cardozo 44'	Report	Mendez 28'	Stadium: Belmore Sports Ground; Attendance: 7,128; Referee: Gerry Connolly

9 February 2001 18	Northern Spirit	0–1	Eastern Pride	Sydney
		Report	Bell 50'	Stadium: North Sydney Oval; Attendance: 2,780; Referee: Peter Green

16 February 2001 19	Football Kingz	1–2	Northern Spirit	Auckland
	Campbell 49'	Report	Burgess 2', 60'	Stadium: Ericsson Stadium; Attendance: 5,988; Referee: Craig Zetter

23 February 2001 20	Newcastle United	2–4	Northern Spirit	Newcastle
	Surjan 48' (pen.); McBreen 79'	Report	Langdon 60'; Watkins 63', 70'; Foster 77'	Stadium: Marathon Stadium; Attendance: 6,875; Referee: Brett Hugo

4 March 2001 21	Northern Spirit	2–3	Adelaide Force	Sydney
	Burgess 61'; Cagalj 89' (o.g.)	Report	Howson 28' (o.g.); Veart 56'; Pelosi 60'	Stadium: North Sydney Oval; Attendance: 2,108; Referee: Mark Shield

10 March 2001 22	Perth Glory	4–1	Northern Spirit	Perth
	Mori 10', 70'; Despotovski 17' (pen.), 89'	Report	Burgess 8' (pen.)	Stadium: Perth Oval; Attendance: 11,911; Referee: Eddie Lennie

23	Northern Spirit	3–0 (Note: Awarded score. Match was not played and was automatically awarded 3–0 to Northern Spirit; result was given after Carlton abandoned the 2000–01 National Soccer League season after eight rounds.)	Carlton

24 March 2001 24	Marconi Fairfield	0–0	Northern Spirit	Sydney
		Report		Stadium: Marconi Stadium; Attendance: 4,802; Referee: Jeremy Blaney

30 March 2001 25	Northern Spirit	1–4	Melbourne Knights	Sydney
	Howson 73'	Report	Vargas 20'; Lapsansky 23'; Marth 67'; Porter 76'	Stadium: North Sydney Oval; Attendance: 3,119; Referee: Peter Green

8 April 2001 26	Brisbane Strikers	1–1	Northern Spirit	Brisbane
	Grierson 18'	Report	Moreira 86'	Stadium: Ballymore Oval; Attendance: 1,680; Referee: Perry Mur

13 April 2001 27	Northern Spirit	0–0	Parramatta Power	Sydney
		Report		Stadium: North Sydney Oval; Attendance: 2,401; Referee: Con Diomis

21 April 2001 28	Canberra Cosmos	3–2	Northern Spirit	Canberra
	Castro 1', 85'; Cortes 89' (pen.)	Report	Burgess 31'; Foster 70'	Stadium: Bruce Stadium; Attendance: 2,054; Referee: Gerry Connolly

25 April 2001 29	Northern Spirit	0–4	Wollongong Wolves	Sydney
		Report	Horsley 45'; Chipperfield 47' (pen.); Petrovski 56', 66'	Stadium: North Sydney Oval; Attendance: 2,849; Referee: Simon Micallef

29 April 2001 30	South Melbourne	6–2	Northern Spirit	Melbourne
	Cunico 56' (o.g.); Vlahos 29'; Boutsianis 45', 48', 50', 58'	Report	Moreira 10'; Burgess 14'	Stadium: Bob Jane Stadium; Attendance: 5,803; Referee: Matthew Breeze

== Statistics ==
=== Appearances and goals ===
Players with no appearances not included in the list.

No.	Pos.	Nat.	Name	National Soccer League		Total	
No.	Pos.	Nat.	Name	Apps	Goals	Apps	Goals
—	FW	(Australia)	Graham Arnold	13	0	13	0
—	MF	(Australia)	Paul Bilokapic	5(8)	0	13	0
—	MF	(Australia)	Matthew Bingley	23	0	23	0
—	FW	(Republic of Ireland)	Ben Burgess	27	16	27	16
—	FW	(Australia)	Simon Catanzaro	2(3)	0	5	0
—	MF	(Australia)	Troy Cranney	22	0	22	0
—	DF	(Australia)	Michael Cunico	26(2)	0	28	0
—	MF	(Australia)	Robert Enes	17(7)	0	24	0
—	MF	(Northern Ireland)	Lee Feeney	2(1)	0	3	0
—	MF	(Australia)	Craig Foster	19(2)	2	21	2
—	FW	(Australia)	Ryan Griffiths	8(5)	0	13	0
—	GK	(Australia)	Paul Henderson	21	0	21	0
—	MF	(Australia)	Stuart Howson	14	1	14	1
—	MF	(Australia)	Matthew Hunter	0(1)	0	1	0
—	MF	(Australia)	Matthew Langdon	22(1)	3	23	3
—	FW	(Australia)	Todd McRae	1	0	1	0
—	MF	(Australia)	Gabriel Mendez	12(2)	3	14	3
—	FW	(Brazil)	Alex Moreira	14(6)	5	20	5
—	FW	(Australia)	Tony Perinich	4(7)	0	11	0
—	GK	(Australia)	John Perosh	8	0	8	0
—	MF	(Australia)	Robbie Slater	4(3)	0	7	0
—	DF	(Australia)	Mike Smith	9	0	9	0
—	MF	(Australia)	Jacek Sobczyk	3(5)	0	8	0
—	MF	(Australia)	Noel Spencer	17(3)	0	20	0
—	MF	(Australia)	Scott Thomas	20(1)	0	21	0
—	FW	(Australia)	Daniel Watkins	6(11)	2	17	2

=== Clean sheets ===
Rank	No.	Pos	Nat	Name	National Soccer League	Total
1	—	GK	(Australia)	Paul Henderson	8	8
Total					8	8
