= 2003–04 Northern Spirit FC season =

Northern Spirit
2003–04 season
- Manager: Lawrie McKinna
- Stadium: Pittwater Park; Gabbie Stadium
- National Soccer League: 6th
- Top goalscorer: Stewart Petrie (7)
- Highest home attendance: 2,971 vs. Brisbane Strikers (21 September 2003); National Soccer League
- Lowest home attendance: 1,061 vs. Football Kingz (20 February 2004); National Soccer League
- Average home league attendance: 1,999
- Biggest win: 4–0 vs. Sydney Olympic (4 October 2003); National Soccer League
- Biggest defeat: 0–3 vs. Parramatta Power (29 November 2003); National Soccer League; 1–4 vs. Wollongong Wolves (16 January 2004); National Soccer League

The 2003–04 season was the sixth season in the history of Northern Spirit (now North West Sydney Spirit). It was also the sixth and final season in the National Soccer League. Northern Spirit finished 7th in their National Soccer League season.

== Players ==
Note: Flags indicate national team as defined under FIFA eligibility rules; some limited exceptions apply. Players may hold more than one non-FIFA nationality.

No.	Pos.	Nation	Player
1	GK	AUS	Paul Henderson
2	DF	ENG	Julian Watts
3	MF	IRL	Wayne O'Sullivan
4	MF	AUS	Noel Spencer
5	DF	AUS	Alex Tobin
6	DF	AUS	Vuko Tomasevic
8	MF	SCO	Ian Ferguson
9	FW	AUS	Adam Kwasnik
10	FW	AUS	Dylan Macallister
11	MF	AUS	Jonti Richter
12	MF	MLT	John Hutchinson
14	MF	AUS	Bradley Groves
16	FW	NZL	Brent Fisher
18	DF	AUS	Alex Wilkinson

No.	Pos.	Nation	Player
19	MF	AUS	Erik Paartalu
20	GK	AUS	Stuart Page
22	MF	AUS	Matthew Osman
23	MF	AUS	Steven Baveas
24	MF	AUS	Oliver Skelding
25	MF	AUS	Omar Obeid
26	MF	AUS	Andrew Mailer
28	MF	AUS	Matthew Hunter
29	DF	AUS	Michael Moulis
30	GK	AUS	Jacob Rex
31	MF	BRA	Caetano Lima
33	DF	AUS	Mark Milligan
—	FW	AUS	Paul Connell

== Transfers ==
=== Transfers in ===
No.	Position	Player	Transferred from	Type/fee	Date	Ref
3	DF	(Republic of Ireland) Wayne O'Sullivan	Parramatta Power		July 2003	
23	MF	Steven Baveas	(Australia) Ryde City		July 2003	
–	GK	Nathan Hughes	(Australia) Sutherland Sharks		July 2003	
9	FW	Adam Kwasnik	(Australia) Manly Warringah Dolphins		September 2003	
22	MF	Matthew Osman	(Australia) Manly Warringah Dolphins		September 2003	
25	MF	Omar Obeid	(Australia) Manly Warringah Dolphins		September 2003	
30	GK	Jacob Rex	(Australia) Manly Warringah Dolphins		September 2003	
31	MF	(Brazil) Caetano Lima	(Australia) Ryde City		January 2004	

== Competitions ==
=== Overview ===
Competition	First match	Last match	Starting round	Final position	Record							
Competition	First match	Last match	Starting round	Final position	Pld	W	D	L	GF	GA	GD	Win %
National Soccer League	21 September 2003	29 February 2004	Matchday 1	7th	24	9	3	12	31	33	−2	37.50
Total					24	9	3	12	31	33	−2	37.50

Last updated: complete
Source: Competitions

=== National Soccer League ===
==== League table ====
Pos	Team	Pld	W	D	L	GF	GA	GD	Pts	Qualification
5	South Melbourne	24	11	4	9	39	21	+18	37	Qualification to Finals series
6	Brisbane Strikers	24	9	5	10	28	33	−5	32	Qualification to Finals series
7	Northern Spirit	24	9	3	12	31	33	−2	30	
8	Sydney Olympic	24	7	8	9	26	31	−5	29	
9	Wollongong Wolves	24	8	5	11	34	41	−7	29	

Source: ozfootball.net
Rules for classification: 1) Points; 2) Goal difference; 3) Goals scored;

==== Results summary ====
Overall								Home						Away					
Pld	W	D	L	GF	GA	GD	Pts	W	D	L	GF	GA	GD	W	D	L	GF	GA	GD
24	9	3	12	31	33	−2	30	6	2	4	20	13	+7	3	1	8	11	20	−9

Source: worldfootball.net

==== Results by round ====
Round	1	2	3	4	5	6	7	8	9	10	11	12	13	14	15	16	17	18	19	20	21	22	23	24	25	26
Ground	H	A	H	A	H	A	H	A	B	H	A	H	A	A	H	A	H	A	H	A	H	B	A	H	A	H
Result	L	L	W	L	L	W	W	W	✖	L	L	W	L	L	D	L	D	L	W	L	W	✖	D	L	W	W
Position	13	13	9	10	11	9	7	3	5	7	8	8	9	9	9	11	11	11	9	10	9	10	9	9	9	7

Source: worldfootball.net
A = Away; H = Home; W = Win; D = Draw; L = Loss

==== Matches ====
21 September 2003 1	Northern Spirit	1–3	Brisbane Strikers	Sydney
	Hutchinson 53'	Report	Morley 15', 45'; Rose 62'	Stadium: Pittwater Park; Attendance: 2,971; Referee: Con Diomis

26 September 2003 2	Newcastle United	2–1	Northern Spirit	Newcastle
	Wheelhouse 2' (pen.), 77' (pen.)	Report	Macallister 28'	Stadium: McDonald Jones Stadium; Attendance: 4,673; Referee: James Lewis

4 October 2003 3	Northern Spirit	4–0	Sydney Olympic	Sydney
	Richter 47'; Ferguson 57'; Macallister 68'; Petrie 81'	Report		Stadium: Pittwater Park; Attendance: 2,819; Referee: Matthew Breeze

12 October 2003 4	Marconi Fairfield	2–1	Northern Spirit	Sydney
	Harris 21'; Spiteri 54'	Report	Petrie 40'	Stadium: Marconi Stadium; Attendance: 2,255; Referee: Angelo Nardi

19 October 2003 5	Northern Spirit	3–5	Perth Glory	Sydney
	O'Sullivan 6', 34'; Osman 38'	Report	Pondeljak 11'; Mori 12'; Despotovski 14'; Hassell 43', 48'	Stadium: Pittwater Park; Attendance: 2,867; Referee: Matthew Breeze

26 October 2003 6	Melbourne Knights	0–1	Northern Spirit	Melbourne
		Report	Macallister 2'	Stadium: Knights Stadium; Attendance: 2,900; Referee: Ben Williams

2 November 2003 7	Northern Spirit	3–0	Wollongong Wolves	Sydney
	Petrie 35', 64', 80'	Report		Stadium: Pittwater Park; Attendance: 2,388; Referee: Eddie Lennie

8 November 2003 8	Football Kingz	0–2	Northern Spirit	Auckland
		Report	Macallister 55'; Ferguson 68' (pen.)	Stadium: Mount Smart Stadium; Attendance: 1,662; Referee: Brett Hugo

23 November 2003 10	Northern Spirit	0–1	Sydney United	Sydney
		Report	Santalab 4'	Stadium: Pittwater Park; Attendance: 1,371; Referee: Brett Hugo

29 November 2003 11	Parramatta Power	3–0	Northern Spirit	Sydney
	Milicic 19', 47'; Elrich 90+6'	Report		Stadium: Parramatta Stadium; Attendance: 3,123; Referee: Ben Williams

7 December 2003 12	Northern Spirit	3–1	South Melbourne	Sydney
	Petrie 45', 56'; Fisher 88'	Report	Curcija 54'	Stadium: Pittwater Park; Attendance: 1,859; Referee: Angelo Nardi

10 December 2003 13	Adelaide United	1–0	Northern Spirit	Adelaide
	Saric 8'	Report		Stadium: Hindmarsh Stadium; Attendance: 9,159; Referee: Craig Zetter

13 December 2003 14	Brisbane Strikers	3–1	Northern Spirit	Brisbane
	Morley 56'; Brownlie 82'; Pilic 87'	Report	Kwasnik 46'	Stadium: Perry Park; Attendance: 2,137; Referee: Angelo Nardi

21 December 2003 15	Northern Spirit	1–1	Newcastle United	Sydney
	Thomas 62' (o.g.)	Report	Masi 34'	Stadium: Pittwater Park; Attendance: 1,935; Referee: Eddie Lennie

28 December 2003 16	Sydney Olympic	1–0	Northern Spirit	Sydney
	Baird 47' (pen.)	Report		Stadium: OKI Jubilee Stadium; Attendance: 2,484; Referee: Mark Shield

4 January 2004 17	Northern Spirit	0–0	Marconi Fairfield	Sydney
		Report		Stadium: Pittwater Park; Attendance: 2,115; Referee: Simon Przydacz

21 January 2004 18	Perth Glory	3–2	Northern Spirit	Perth
	Murphy 9'; Pondeljak 42'; Despotovski 85'	Report	Richter 25'; Tomasevic 90+2'	Stadium: Members Equity Stadium; Attendance: 7,996; Referee: Eddie Lennie

11 January 2004 19	Northern Spirit	2–0	Melbourne Knights	Sydney
	Hutchinson 21'; Milligan 58'	Report		Stadium: Pittwater Park; Attendance: 1,495; Referee: James Lewis

16 January 2004 20	Wollongong Wolves	4–1	Northern Spirit	Wollongong
	Hughes 35'; Young 38', 65'; Nwaogazi 64'	Report	Richter 84'	Stadium: WIN Stadium; Attendance: 2,855; Referee: James Lewis

20 February 2004 21	Northern Spirit	1–0	Football Kingz	Sydney
	Richter 60'	Report		Stadium: Gabbie Stadium; Attendance: 1,061; Referee: Craig Zetter

8 February 2004 23	Sydney United	0–0	Northern Spirit	Sydney
		Report		Stadium: Sydney United Sports Centre; Attendance: 1,964; Referee: Simon Micallef

15 February 2004 24	Northern Spirit	0–1	Parramatta Power	Sydney
		Report	Petrovski 23'	Stadium: Pittwater Park; Attendance: 1,106; Referee: James Lewis

22 February 2004 25	South Melbourne	1–2	Northern Spirit	Melbourne
	Coveny 71'	Report	Kwasnik 52'; Richter 68'	Stadium: Bob Jane Stadium; Attendance: 5,250; Referee: Ben Williams

29 February 2004 26	Northern Spirit	2–1	Adelaide United	Sydney
	Kwasnik 27', 69'	Report	Vidmar 45'	Stadium: Pittwater Park; Attendance: 2,009; Referee: Matthew Breeze

== Statistics ==
=== Appearances and goals ===
Players with no appearances not included in the list.

No.	Pos.	Nat.	Name	National Soccer League		Total	
No.	Pos.	Nat.	Name	Apps	Goals	Apps	Goals
1	GK	(Australia)	Paul Henderson	23	0	23	0
2	DF	(England)	Julian Watts	15(1)	0	16	0
3	MF	(Republic of Ireland)	Wayne O'Sullivan	24	2	24	2
4	MF	(Australia)	Noel Spencer	20	0	20	0
5	DF	(Australia)	Alex Tobin	4(2)	0	6	0
6	DF	(Australia)	Vuko Tomasevic	19(3)	1	22	1
8	MF	(Scotland)	Ian Ferguson	18	2	18	2
9	FW	(Australia)	Adam Kwasnik	8(14)	4	22	4
10	FW	(Australia)	Dylan Macallister	13	4	13	4
11	MF	(Australia)	Jonti Richter	14(1)	5	15	5
12	MF	(Malta)	John Hutchinson	23	2	23	2
14	MF	(Australia)	Bradley Groves	7(1)	0	8	0
16	FW	(New Zealand)	Brent Fisher	4(8)	1	12	1
18	DF	(Australia)	Alex Wilkinson	15	0	15	0
19	MF	(Australia)	Erik Paartalu	0(1)	0	1	0
20	GK	(Australia)	Stuart Page	1(1)	0	2	0
22	MF	(Australia)	Matthew Osman	11(4)	1	15	1
23	MF	(Australia)	Steven Baveas	2(8)	0	10	0
25	MF	(Australia)	Omar Obeid	0(2)	0	2	0
26	MF	(Australia)	Andrew Mailer	0(6)	0	6	0
28	MF	(Australia)	Matthew Hunter	9(3)	0	12	0
29	DF	(Australia)	Michael Moulis	0(1)	0	1	0
31	MF	(Brazil)	Caetano Lima	0(3)	0	3	0
33	DF	(Australia)	Mark Milligan	14	1	14	1

=== Clean sheets ===
Rank	No.	Pos	Nat	Name	National Soccer League	Total
1	1	GK	(Australia)	Paul Henderson	8	8
Total					8	8
