= List of North West Sydney Spirit FC records and statistics =

North West Sydney Spirit Football Club is an Australian semi-professional association football club based in Sydney. The club was formed and admitted into the National Soccer League in 1998.

The list encompasses the records set by the club, their managers and their players. The player records section itemises the club's leading goalscorers and those who have made most appearances in first-team competitions. It also records notable achievements by North West Sydney Spirit players on the international stage. Attendance records in Sydney are also included.

The club's record appearance maker is Paul Henderson, who made 133 appearances between 1998 and 2004. Ben Burgess is North West Sydney Spirit's record goalscorer, scoring 16 goals in total.

== Player records ==
=== Appearances ===
==== Most appearances ====
Competitive matches only, includes appearances as substitute. Numbers in brackets indicate goals scored.

Rank	Player	Years	Appearances
1	(Australia) Paul Henderson	1998–2004	133 (0)
2	(Australia) Noel Spencer	2001–2004	92 (4)
3	(Australia) Michael Cunico	1998–2001	81 (2)
3	(Australia) Robert Enes	1998–2002	81 (2)
5	(Malta) John Hutchinson	2001–2004	77 (12)
6	(Australia) Matthew Langdon	1998–2001	71 (7)
7	(Australia) Troy Cranney	1998–2002	67 (1)
8	(Australia) Paul Bilokapic	1998–2001	66 (5)
8	(Australia) Julian Watts	2001–2004	66 (2)
10	(Australia) Robbie Slater	1998–2001	61 (10)

=== Goalscorers ===
- Most goals in a season: Ben Burgess, 16 goals (in the 2000–01 season)

==== Top goalscorers ====
Ben Burgess is the top goalscorer for North West Sydney Spirit.

Competitive matches only. Numbers in brackets indicate appearances made.

Rank	Player	Years	Goals
1	(Republic of Ireland) Ben Burgess	2000–2001	16 (27)
2	(Australia) Pablo Cardozo	2001–2002	14 (22)
3	(Malta) John Hutchinson	2001–2004	12 (77)
4	(Scotland) Stewart Petrie	2003–2004	10 (37)
4	(Australia) Robbie Slater	1998–2001	10 (61)
6	(Australia) Adam Kwasnik	2003–2004	9 (49)
6	(Australia) David Seal	1999–2000	9 (20)
6	(Australia) Vuka Tomasevic	2002–2004	9 (51)
9	(Australia) Kresimir Marusic	1998–1999	8 (27)
10	(Australia) Matthew Langdon	1998–2001	7 (71)
10	(Australia) Jonti Richter	2002–2004	7 (44)

=== International ===
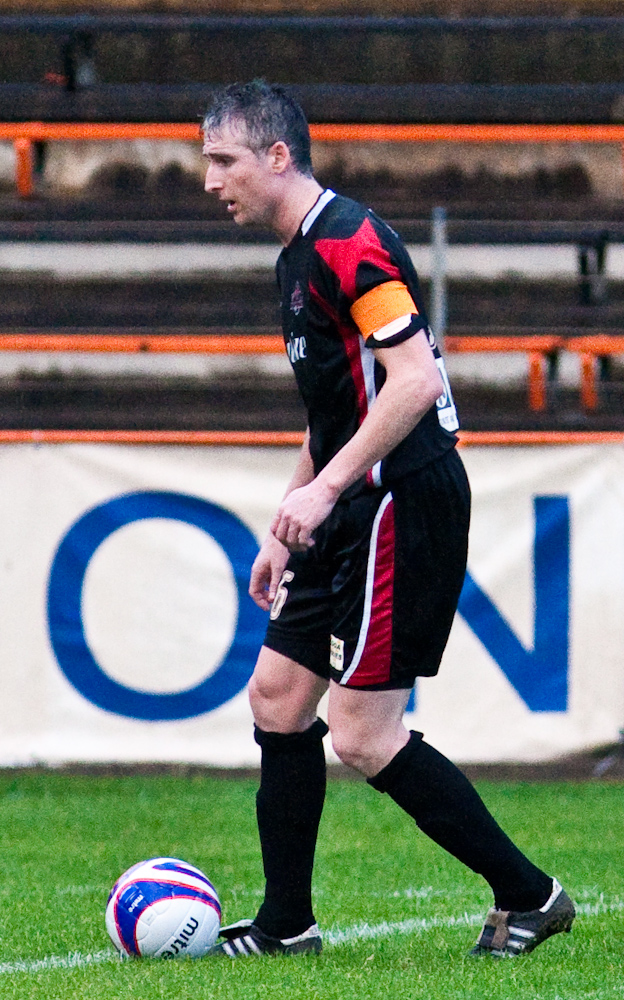
Luke Casserly was the first North West Sydney Spirit player to receive an international cap.

This section refers only to caps won while a North West Sydney Spirit player.

- First capped player: Luke Casserly, for Australia against Chile on 9 February 2000
- Most capped player: Luke Casserly with 4 caps

== Club records ==
=== Matches ===
- First National Soccer League match: Northern Spirit 0–2 Sydney Olympic, National Soccer League, 9 October 1998
- Record win:
  - 4–0 against Marconi Fairfield, National Soccer League, 15 January 1999
  - 4–0 against Sydney Olympic, National Soccer League, 4 October 2003
- Record defeat: 0–6 against Adelaide Force, National Soccer League, 25 May 2003
- Record consecutive wins: 3
  - from 25 October 1998 to 6 November 1998
  - from 15 January 1999 to 26 January 1999
  - from 4 February 2003 to 16 February 2003
  - from 26 October 2003 to 8 November 2003
- Record consecutive defeats: 6, from 14 April 2000 to 15 October 2000
- Record consecutive draws: 3, from 3 December 2000 to 17 December 2000
- Record consecutive matches without a defeat: 6, from 27 December 1998 to 26 January 1999
- Record consecutive matches without a win: 10, from 27 February 2001 to 29 April 2001

=== Goals ===
- Most league goals scored in a season: 72 in 26 matches, NSW Division One, 2007
- Fewest league goals scored in a season: 26 in 10 matches, National Premier Leagues NSW 2, 2020
- Most league goals conceded in a season: 58 in 34 matches, National Soccer League, 1999–2000
- Fewest league goals conceded in a season: 16 in 22 matches, National Soccer League, 2015

=== Points ===
- Most points in a season: 58 in 26 matches, NSW Division One, 2007
- Fewest points in a season: 22
  - in 22 matches, NSW Super League, 2012
  - in 10 matches, National Premier Leagues NSW 2, 2020

=== Attendances ===
- Highest attendance: 18,985, against Sydney Olympic, National Soccer League, 9 October 1998
- Lowest attendance: 1,004, against Melbourne Knights, National Soccer League, 29 November 2002
