= Lee Feeney =

Northern Irish footballer

Personal information
- Date of birth: 21 March 1978 (age 48)
- Place of birth: Kilkeel, Northern Ireland
- Positions: Attacking midfielder; striker

Team information
- Current team: Bangor

Youth career
- 1994–1997: Linfield

Senior career*
Years	Team	Apps	(Gls)
1997	Ards	21	(4)
1997–1999	Linfield	34	(7)
1999–2002	Rangers	1	(0)
2001	→ Northern Spirit (loan)	3	(0)
2002–2003	Linfield	20	(4)
2003–2005	Ards	24	(3)
2004	→ Glenavon (loan)	1	(0)
2005	Shamrock Rovers	9	(1)
2005–2006	Bangor	9	(6)
2006–2009	Newry City	61	(8)
2009–2010	Dromara Village		
2010–2012	Moneyslane		
2012–2015	Orchard City		
2015–2016	Rathfriland Rangers		
2016–2020	Banbridge Rangers		

International career
1998–1999	Northern Ireland U21	8	(1)

Managerial career
- 2016-2018: Banbridge Rangers
- 2020-: Bangor
- * Club domestic league appearances and goals

Lee Feeney (born 21 March 1978 in Kilkeel) is a Northern Irish association football coach and former player who manages NIFL Premiership side Bangor F.C.

== Playing career ==
Feeney began his career at Ards. He made 4 appearances for Ards in the 1997 UEFA Intertoto Cup. He left to join Linfield and made his debut for them back in February 1997 before moving to Rangers for £100,000 in December 1998. He made one appearance, during a 4–0 league win against Dundee in January 1999. Three seasons later he re-joined Linfield. During his second spell at Windsor Park he scored in the UEFA Cup.

He left again in 2002 for Ards then had a spell with Glenavon before signing for Shamrock Rovers for the 2005 season. He scored on his debut on live television but did not score again in 11 total appearances and was released in July. He then joined Bangor before joining Newry City.

His brother Cullen, cousin Warren Feeney, and two uncles were also footballers.

== Managerial career ==
Feeney's first steps into management were confirmed when he was announced as the new manager of Mid Ulster Football League Intermediate A side Banbridge Rangers F.C. on 3 June 2016. Feeney departed the club on 17 July 2018 having taken the club within one point of winning the Intermediate A league title. Feeney returned to coaching in March 2019, serving as part of cousin Warren's coaching staff at Ards before leaving in June following the club's relegation to the second division.

Feeney was appointed Bangor manager on 4 June 2020.
