= Mitchell Prentice =

Australian footballer

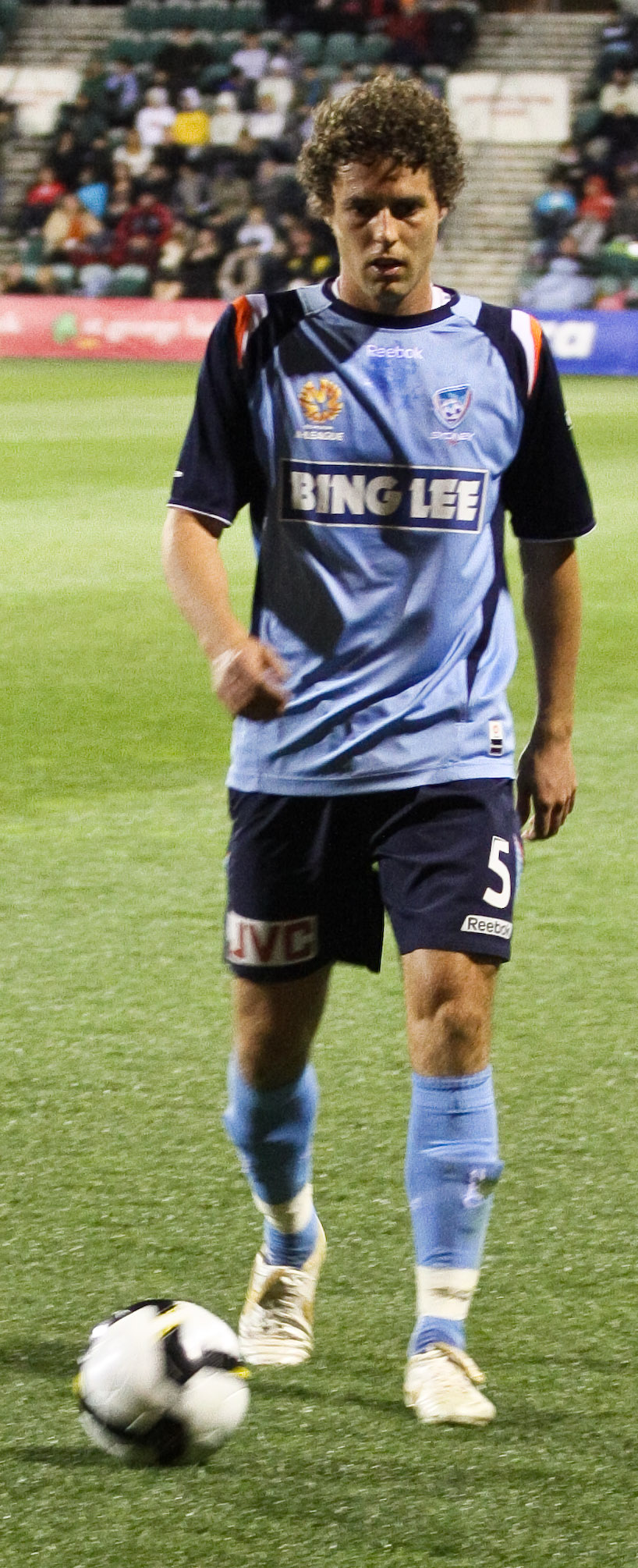

Personal information
- Date of birth: 2 March 1983 (age 43)
- Place of birth: Wollongong, Australia
- Height: 1.81 m (5 ft 11 in)
- Positions: Central midfielder; right back

Youth career
- 2000–2001: AIS

Senior career*
Years	Team	Apps	(Gls)
2001–2003	Northern Spirit	0	(0)
2003–2004	Marconi Stallions	1	(0)
2004	Dinamo-Zenit Yerevan		
2004–2005	Stirling Albion	1	(0)
2005	Central Coast Lightning		
2006–2007	Pahang FA		
2007–2008	Perth Glory	15	(1)
2008–2010	Sydney FC	23	(0)
- * Club domestic league appearances and goals as of 29 November 2008 ‡ National team caps and goals as of 6 December 2007

Mitchell Prentice (born 2 March 1983) is an Australian footballer.

== Club career ==
An AIS graduate, he played with Northern Spirit and Marconi Stallions in the NSL before trying his luck overseas where he had short stints with Scottish club Stirling Albion and Malaysian Super League side Pahang FA. A series of impressive performances during Perth Glory's 2007 pre-season trip to Malaysia secured a place for Mitchell on the club's list for the 2007-08 season.

Prentice left Perth Glory at the end of the 2007/08 season, after failing to negotiate a new contract. He was signed by Sydney FC for the 2008/09 season, on a 2-year deal. He scored his first goal for Sydney in their first 2008 preseason cup game against Queensland Roar at Campbelltown Stadium in their 2-1 victory. He scored off the free kick that resulted in Queensland's Seo Hyuk-Su being sent off for a sliding tackle against Sydney's Alex Brosque. Prentice played his first A-League match as a Sydney FC player on 30 August 2008 at the Sydney Football Stadium against his old club Perth Glory. Prentice played the full match in which Sydney FC won 5-2. Prentice decided to end his contract 3 months early with the Sky blues in early 2010.

== Coaching career ==
Mitchell returned to Perth to take up a junior coaching position with Perth Glory. He coached there for 8 years.

He ran a football coaching business (P2P Football Academy) aimed at youth development. At (Prepared to Play) the focus was on key technical aspects of football for young players aged 8–14 years of age. P2P enhanced each individuals skills level and helped young footballers progress through practicing game relevant skills and techniques. Outlined in each training session were the four core skills from the FFA curriculum which were met in realistic game situations. The program was run in conjunction with Melville City FC, the largest football club in WA.

After a period as head coach of the WA State team, Mitchell moved to Bayswater in 2018 to take on the role of Development/Academy Director 6yrs-12 yrs. In addition he coaches two of their junior NPL squads.
