= Vuko Tomasevic =

Australian soccer player

Vuko Tomašević
Personal information
- Full name: Vuko Tomašević
- Date of birth: 13 May 1980 (age 46)
- Place of birth: Sydney, Australia
- Height: 1.86 m (6 ft 1 in)
- Position: Left back

Youth career
- 1998: Bonnyrigg White Eagles

Senior career*
Years	Team	Apps	(Gls)
1998–1999	Marconi Stallions	3	(0)
2000–2001	APIA Leichhardt	40	(10)
2001–2002	Bonnyrigg White Eagles	23	(10)
2002–2004	Northern Spirit	51	(9)
2004–2005	Bonnyrigg White Eagles	9	(2)
2005–2006	Marconi Stallions		
2006–2007	Central Coast Mariners	11	(0)
2007–2009	Marconi Stallions		
2010–2013	Bonnyrigg White Eagles		

International career^{‡}
1996–1997	Australia U17	6	(1)
- * Club domestic league appearances and goals as of 10 October 2013 ‡ National team caps and goals as of 11 March 2013

Vuko Tomašević (born 13 May 1980 in Sydney, New South Wales, Australia) is an Australian footballer.

== Biography ==
Tomašević is best known for a National Soccer League goal with the Northern Spirit during their 2002–03 campaign.
