= Bradley Groves =

Australian soccer player

Brad Groves
Personal information
- Full name: Bradley Groves
- Date of birth: 29 January 1982 (age 44)
- Place of birth: Parramatta, Australia
- Position: Midfielder

Youth career
- 1999–2001: Leeds United F.C.

Senior career*
Years	Team	Apps	(Gls)
2001–2002	Parramatta Power SC	2	(0)
2002/03–2003/04	Northern Spirit F.C.	22	(3)
2003	Tampines Rovers FC→(loan)		
2003/04	Bonnyrigg White Eagles F.C.	10	(0)
2004–2010	Manly United FC		

International career
1999	Australia U17		
- * Club domestic league appearances and goals

Bradley Groves (born 29 January 1982 in Parramatta, Australia) is a former Australian soccer player who last played for Manly United from 2004 to 2010. Although right-footed, he can be deployed anywhere in midfield, including the left side. Groves was part of the most successful Australian Football Team being the 1999 U/17 Joeys, under Les Schenflug. The team were defeated in a penalty shoot-out at the 1999 FIFA U/17 World Cup Final held in New Zealand by Brazil. The squad are the only Australian team to make the final of a FIFA tournament and received a FIFA Silver medal. He is currently the reserve grade striker at Ourimbah United Football Club

== Singapore ==
Loaned out to Tampines Rovers of the Singapore S.League in 2003, Groves took part in a few training sessions with the club before marking his S.League debut against Jurong, getting a minor concussion and being stretchered off the field with 12 minutes left to go.

Then Tampines Rovers' coach Des Bulpin stated that he needed to participate in two to three games in order to settle in. We have seen in training what he will bring to our team. His vision and ball retention are second good. I'm excited to see what he produces throughout the season.

== Personal life ==
Born in Parramatta to Lynn and Michael Groves, he has three sisters- Natalie, Belinda and Michelle. Married in 2008 to his longtime sweetheart Kim Groves.
