= Louie Acevski =

Australian-Macedonian goalkeeper

Personal information
- Full name: Lupce Acevski
- Date of birth: 14 November 1977 (age 48)
- Place of birth: Melbourne, Australia
- Height: 1.84 m (6 ft 1/2 in)
- Position: Goalkeeper

Senior career*
Years	Team	Apps	(Gls)
1995–1996	St Albans Saints	17	(0)
1997–1999	Preston Lions	73	(0)
1999–2001	Melbourne Knights	35	(0)
2001–2002	Northern Spirit	11	(0)
2003–2004	Adelaide City	18	(0)
2005–2006	Heidelberg United	59	(0)
2006–2007	Preston Lions	14	(0)
2007–2008	FK SIAD Most	7	(0)
2008	Melbourne Victory	0	(0)
2008–2009	Preston Lions	27	(0)
2009–2012	Hume City	25	(0)

Managerial career
- 2012–2016: Hume City FC
- 2017–2025: Preston Lions
- * Club domestic league appearances and goals

Lupce "Lou" Acevski (born 14 November 1977) is an Australian former soccer goalkeeper who later became a coach. As a player, he played 71 times in the Australian National Soccer League (NSL) for Melbourne Knights, Northern Spirit and Adelaide City. He had a short stint in Czech football where he played seven times for FK SIAD Most. He also made over 200 senior appearances in the Victorian Premier League. Lupce was coach of Hume City FC in the National Premier Leagues Victoria, He leave for Hume City FC on 21 July 2016. and return is boyhood club Preston Lions as coach He now works as director of Preston Lions.
