= Wayne O'Sullivan =

Irish footballer and coach

Personal information
- Full name: Wayne St John O'Sullivan
- Date of birth: 25 February 1974 (age 52)
- Place of birth: Akrotiri, Cyprus
- Position: Right midfielder

Youth career
- pre–1994: Swindon Town

Senior career*
Years	Team	Apps	(Gls)
1994–1997	Swindon Town	89	(3)
1997–1999	Cardiff City	85	(4)
1999–2001	Plymouth Argyle	85	(3)
2001–2003	Parramatta Power	55	(2)
2003–2004	Northern Spirit	24	(0)
2004	Geylang United		(4)
2005–2007	Central Coast Mariners	37	(1)
2011	Lake Macquarie City	11	(0)

International career
1995	Republic of Ireland U21	2	(0)

Managerial career
- 2008–2009: Wellington Phoenix (asst.)
- 2009–2012: Newcastle Jets FC W-League
- 2013–2015: Central Coast Mariners (asst.)
- 2018: Central Coast Mariners (caretaker)
- 2019–2021: Bonnyrigg White Eagles F.C.
- 2019 - current: Barker College
- * Club domestic league appearances and goals

Wayne St John O'Sullivan (born 25 February 1974) is an Irish retired professional footballer. Since retiring as a player he has worked as a coach.

Born in Cyprus, O'Sullivan played youth football for Swindon Town before making his professional debut with the club. In 2001, he moved to Australia, where he played in the National Soccer League and A-League, as well as one season in Singapore.

O'Sullivan represented Republic of Ireland at youth level.

O'Sullivan was former coach for Bonnyrigg White Eagles F.C. in National Premier League NSW 2 side, also for A-League caretaker coach for Central Coast Mariners FC and for W-League side Newcastle Jets. O'Sullivan is the current coach for Barker College.

== Playing career ==
=== Club ===
O'Sullivan was part of the regular first eleven for Plymouth Argyle. At the time Plymouth were placed low in the Nationwide Division 3 (now Football League Two), he along with Paul McGregor and Martin Phillips were considered the most consistent players at the time. But in the summer of 2000 he headed to Australia to continue his playing career.

Following the demise of the old National Soccer League competition and the creation of the A-League, O'Sullivan signed with Central Coast Mariners in late 2004 to play in the newly formed A-League. At the club, he was a favourite among fans for his tenacity and energy on the field. After an inconsistent 2006–07 season with The Mariners, during which he was often deployed as a right-back, instead of his preferred right-midfield position, the hard-working midfielder/defender was released.

Although there is some controversy surrounding Lawrie McKinna's decision to release O'Sullivan, it was believed by many in the Mariners camp that he was past his best and for the club to continue to grow in a developing league, his release was necessary.

=== International ===
O'Sullivan came on as a substitute for Republic of Ireland under-21 in a win over Latvia in 1996 UEFA European Under-21 Championship qualification on 10 October 1995. He made a total of two appearances for the side.

== Management career ==
After being released by Central Coast Mariners, O'Sullivan had spent months trying to find a spot in another football team to continue his playing career, but was not successful.

On Friday, 18 May 2007, O'Sullivan was named assistant coach for A-League club Wellington Phoenix on a two-year deal. He worked alongside Ricki Herbert, Luciano Trani and former Celtic goalkeeper Jonathan Gould.

On Thursday, 21 November 2013, O'Sullivan was named assistant coach for the Central Coast Mariners on a contract until the end of the 2014–15 A-League season, working alongside newly appointed coach Phil Moss.

Following the immediate departure of Central Coast Mariner's head coach Paul Okon, O'Sullivan was named as the caretaker coach until the end of the 2017–18 A-League season.

On 16 May 2019, O'Sullivan was appointed as new coach for the remainder of the 2019 National Premier Leagues NSW 2 season with the Bonnyrigg White Eagles FC.

== Honours ==
Swindon Town

- Football League Second Division: 1995–96
