= Andy McDermott (soccer, born 1977) =

Australian soccer player

Personal information
- Full name: Andrew McDermott
- Date of birth: 24 March 1977 (age 49)
- Place of birth: Sydney, Australia
- Height: 1.75 m (5 ft 9 in)
- Position: Defender

Senior career*
Years	Team	Apps	(Gls)
1995–1997	Queens Park Rangers	6	(2)
1997–2000	West Bromwich Albion	52	(1)
2000–2001	Notts County	25	(0)
2001–2003	Northern Spirit FC	47	(6)
2003–2004	Dunfermline Athletic	6	(0)

International career
1993	Australia U17	4	(0)
1998	Australia U23	3	(0)
- * Club domestic league appearances and goals

Andrew McDermott (born 24 March 1977 in Sydney) is a retired Australian professional soccer player.

McDermott spent most of his career in England at West Bromwich Albion. In a three-year spell at the club he made over 50 appearances and scored twice, with strikes against Luton Town in the League Cup and Wolverhampton Wanderers in the league.
