= Gabriel Mendez =

Argentine footballer

Personal information
- Full name: Gabriel Mendez
- Date of birth: 12 March 1973 (age 53)
- Place of birth: Buenos Aires, Argentina
- Position: Midfielder

Senior career*
Years	Team	Apps	(Gls)
1991–1992	Marconi Stallions	5	(0)
1992	St George Saints	10	(0)
1992–1995	Parramatta Eagles	16	(3)
1995–1996	Admira Wacker	12	(0)
1996–1997	Notts County	3	(0)
1997	Parramatta Power	13	(5)
1997–1998	Marconi Stallions	11	(1)
1998	Parramatta Power	5	(2)
1998–1999	Northern Spirit FC	13	(0)
1999–2000	Sydney Olympic	29	(5)
2000–2002	Northern Spirit FC	16	(3)
2001–2002	Sydney United	11	(2)
2003	Johor FA	?	(?)
2003–2004	St George Saints	22	(2)
2004	Belmore Hercules	11	(1)
2004–2005	St George Saints	?	(?)
2005–2006	Kedah FA		
2007	Blacktown City Demons		
2013	St Columba's Castle Hill	1	(0)

International career^{‡}
1994–2000	Australia	9	(0)
- * Club domestic league appearances and goals as of 26 July 2007 ‡ National team caps and goals as of 26 July 2007

Gabriel Mendez (born 12 March 1973) is a former Australian association football player, who attended Patrician Brothers' College, Fairfield.

An attacking midfielder, the much-travelled Mendez is a former player of Admira Wacker and Notts County in Europe and for Malaysian side Kedah FA. He is also a former Australia national football team player from 1994 to 2000.

An unexpected playing return with St Columba's Castle Hill in 2013 ended prematurely, with a hamstring injury curtailing an initially bright performance.

His daughter Seone Mendez is a tennis player and his son Gian Mendez is a professional footballer.
