= Noel Spencer =

Australian soccer player

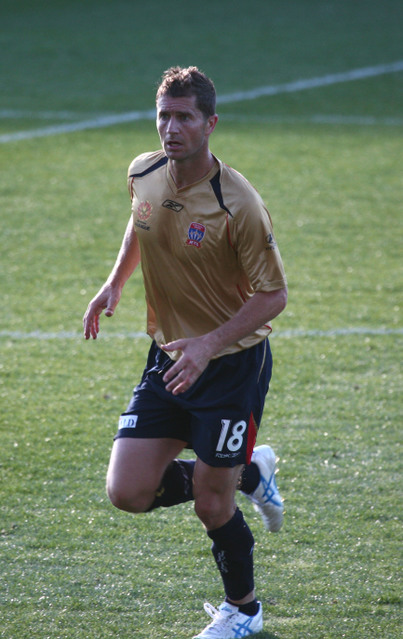
- Spencer in 2007

Personal information
- Date of birth: 26 July 1977 (age 49)
- Place of birth: Wollongong, Australia
- Height: 1.83 m (6 ft 0 in)
- Position: Central midfielder

Youth career
- Koonawarra

Senior career*
Years	Team	Apps	(Gls)
1995	Lysaghts		
1996–2000	Wollongong Wolves	79	(3)
2000–2004	Northern Spirit	92	(4)
2004–2005	Parramatta Eagles		
2005–2007	Central Coast Mariners	41	(6)
2007	Sydney FC	0	(0)
2007–2009	Newcastle Jets	24	(0)
2009–2014	Dapto Dandaloo Fury		

International career
1998	Australia U23	3	(0)

Managerial career
- 2014: Dapto Dandaloo Fury (interim)
- 2015–: Dapto Dandaloo Fury
- * Club domestic league appearances and goals

Noel Spencer (born 26 July 1977) is an Australian former professional soccer player who coaches Dapto Dandaloo Fury in the Illawarra Premier League.

== Club career ==
=== NSL ===
Spencer was born in Wollongong, Australia. He played for his hometown from 1996 to 2000 and was part of Wollongong Wolves championship-winning team of the 1999–2000 season. After the championship win Noel left for Northern Spirit which he played for and later captained until the NSL became defunct. During the period between the end of the NSL competition and the beginning of the A-League he played a season for Parramatta Eagles.

=== Central Coast Mariners ===
Spencer was the first captain of the Mariners, and took his team to the inaugural Hyundai A-League Grand Final, narrowly missing out on the honour of being the first captain to win the trophy. He scored on the opening day of the inaugural A-League season, away from home against Perth Glory, with a 30-yard drive from distance into the top right hand corner of the net. This goal was awarded the "Jesters' Pies Marinators' Goal of the Year" award at the end of the season. During the 2005–06 A-League season he scored six goals and started in every single game for the Mariners. This record continued until Sunday 12 November when he was dropped because of injury which from the starting team against the Newcastle Jets. On 26 January 2007, he along with Vuko Tomasevic and Wayne O'Sullivan were told that their contracts would not be renewed for the next season.

=== Sydney FC ===
After being released by the Mariners, Spencer signed a six-month contract with Sydney FC. He played for Sydney in the 2007 AFC Champions League.

=== Newcastle United Jets ===
In May 2007 Spencer signed a two-year deal with the Newcastle United Jets as a replacement for Tim Brown. He made his A-League debut for the Jets when he came on as a substitute against Perth Glory on 26 August 2007. After the 2008–09 season he announced his retirement from professional football due injury.

=== Dapto Dandaloo Fury ===
In 2009, following being released by the Jets, Spencer signed for Dapto Dandaloo Fury FC in the semi-professional Illawarra Premier League, helping the club win silverware in 2009, 2011, and 2012. In his final season at the club, he was promoted to player-coach, and led the team to the season Premiership, and Grand Final win over Bulli FC.

== Honours ==
Central Coast Mariners

- A-League Pre-Season Challenge Cup: 2005

Newcastle Jets

- A-League Championship: 2007–08

Wollongong Wolves

- NSL Championship: 1999–2000

Dapto Dandaloo Fury

- Illawarra Premier League Champions: 2009, 2011, 2012, 2014
