= Alex Tobin =

Australian soccer player (born 1965)

Alex Tobin OAM
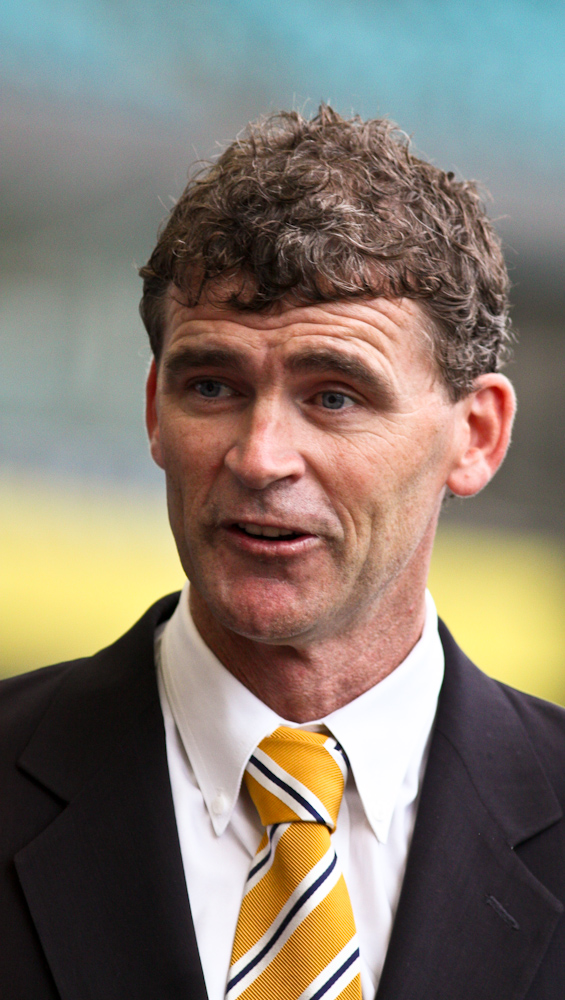

Personal information
- Full name: Alexander Hugh Tobin
- Date of birth: 3 November 1965 (age 60)
- Place of birth: Adelaide, South Australia, Australia
- Height: 1.88 m (6 ft 2 in)
- Position: Centre-back

Youth career
- WT Birkalla
- Adelaide City

Senior career*
Years	Team	Apps	(Gls)
1984–2000	Adelaide City	436	(27)
2001–2002	Parramatta Power	48	(4)
2002–2003	Northern Spirit	38	(0)
Total		522	(31)

International career
1985	Australia U20		
1988–1998	Australia	87	(2)

Managerial career
- 2008–2009: Central Coast Mariners Youth
- 2009–2010: Central Coast Mariners (Asst)
Medal record
Representing Australia
Men's Association football
FIFA Confederations Cup
Runner-up	1997 Saudi Arabia
OFC Nations Cup
Winner	1996 Oceania
Runner-up	1998 Australia
- * Club domestic league appearances and goals

Alexander Hugh Tobin OAM (born 3 November 1965) is an Australian former professional soccer player who played as a centre-back. He is the sixth-most capped player for the Australia national team with 87 'A' appearances, including 30 as captain. He made his international debut on 9 March 1988 in an Olympic qualifying match against Chinese Taipei (3–2) in Adelaide.

== Club career ==
Tobin spent his entire club career playing in Australia. He played most of his club career as a defender with Adelaide City in the National Soccer League. Alex left Adelaide City in 2000, after sixteen years with the club, to join Parramatta Power. He finished his career with Northern Spirit. Tobin played a total of 522 senior club games in Australia.

Tobin worked for the Central Coast Mariners as assistant first team coach.

== The Alex Tobin Medal ==
In 2008, the PFA Alex Tobin OAM Medal was inaugurated by the Professional Footballers Australia (PFA). It is to be awarded annually by the PFA to a current, or a former, player based on four attributes demonstrated by Alex Tobin throughout his career and which reflect the philosophy of the PFA: Leadership, achievement as a player, commitment to ones fellow professionals and service and dedication to the game. The first two medals were conferred on Joe Marston and, posthumously, Johnny Warren.

=== Alex Tobin Medal (A-League) ===
Separately, the broadcaster's A-League Men player of the season award is also named the Alex Tobin Medal. The medal winner is selected by a panel of experts from the league's broadcast partner (Network 10 as of 2026) by awarding points after each regular season game, with the best player on the pitch given 3 points, the second-best given 2 points, and third-best 1 point. At the end of the season, the points are tallied and the player with the most points overall is awarded the Alex Tobin Medal. The winner receives a cash prize, and also nominates a junior club to receive prizes from the league sponsors.

== Career statistics ==
=== Club ===
Appearances and goals by club, season and competition
Club	Season	League			NSL Cup		Oceania		Other		Total	
Club	Season	Division	Apps	Goals	Apps	Goals	Apps	Goals	Apps	Goals	Apps	Goals
Adelaide City	1984	National Soccer League	16	0	0	0	—		—		16	0
Adelaide City	1985	National Soccer League	12	0	0	0	—		—		12	0
Adelaide City	1986	National Soccer League	26	0	0	0	—		—		26	0
Adelaide City	1987	National Soccer League	24	0	0	0	1	0	—		25	0
Adelaide City	1988	National Soccer League	20	1	1	0	—		—		21	1
Adelaide City	1989	National Soccer League	21	0	0	0	—		—		21	0
Adelaide City	1989–90	National Soccer League	25	0	0	0	—		—		25	0
Adelaide City	1990–91	National Soccer League	27	1	2	0	—		—		29	1
Adelaide City	1991–92	National Soccer League	30	3	3	0	—		—		33	3
Adelaide City	1992–93	National Soccer League	30	2	3	0	—		—		33	2
Adelaide City	1993–94	National Soccer League	31	4	3	0	—		—		34	4
Adelaide City	1994–95	National Soccer League	26	2	2	0	—		—		28	2
Adelaide City	1995–96	National Soccer League	34	5	3	0	—		—		37	5
Adelaide City	1996–97	National Soccer League	29	4	0	0	—		—		29	4
Adelaide City	1997–98	National Soccer League	25	2	—		—		—		25	2
Adelaide City	1998–99	National Soccer League	29	3	—		—		—		29	3
Adelaide City	1999–2000	National Soccer League	31	0	—		—		—		31	0
Adelaide City	Total		436	27	17	0	1	0	—		454	27
Parramatta Power	2000–01	National Soccer League	26	2	—		—		—		26	2
Parramatta Power	2001–02	National Soccer League	22	2	—		—		—		22	2
Parramatta Power	Total		48	4	—		—		—		48	4
Northern Spirit	2002–03	National Soccer League	32	0	—		—		—		32	0
Northern Spirit	2003–04	National Soccer League	6	0	—		—		—		6	0
Northern Spirit	Total		38	0	—		—		—		38	0
Career total			522	31	17	0	1	0	—		540	31

=== International ===
Appearances and goals by national team and year
National team	Year	Apps	Goals
Australia	1988	3	1
Australia	1989	0	0
Australia	1990	3	0
Australia	1991	6	0
Australia	1992	15	0
Australia	1993	10	0
Australia	1994	6	0
Australia	1995	9	0
Australia	1996	10	1
Australia	1997	16	0
Australia	1998	9	0
Total		87	2

Scores and results list Australia's goal tally first, score column indicates score after each Tobin goal.

List of international goals scored by Alex Tobin
No.	Date	Venue	Opponent	Score	Result	Competition
1	9 March 1988	Hindmarsh Stadium, Adelaide, Australia	Chinese Taipei	1–0	3–2	1988 Olympics qualification
2	21 September 1996	Loftus Versfeld, Pretoria, South Africa	Kenya	4–0	4–0	Friendly

== Honours ==
Adelaide City:

- NSL Championship: 1986, 1991–92, 1993–94
- NSL Cup: 1989, 1991–92
- Oceania Club Championship: 1987

Australia

- FIFA Confederations Cup: runner-up, 1997
- OFC Nations Cup: 1996; runner-up, 1998

Individual

- FFA Hall of Champions Inductee – 2007
- Joe Marston Medal: 1991–92, 1993–94 with Adelaide City
