= Ryan Griffiths (soccer) =

Australian soccer player (born 1981)

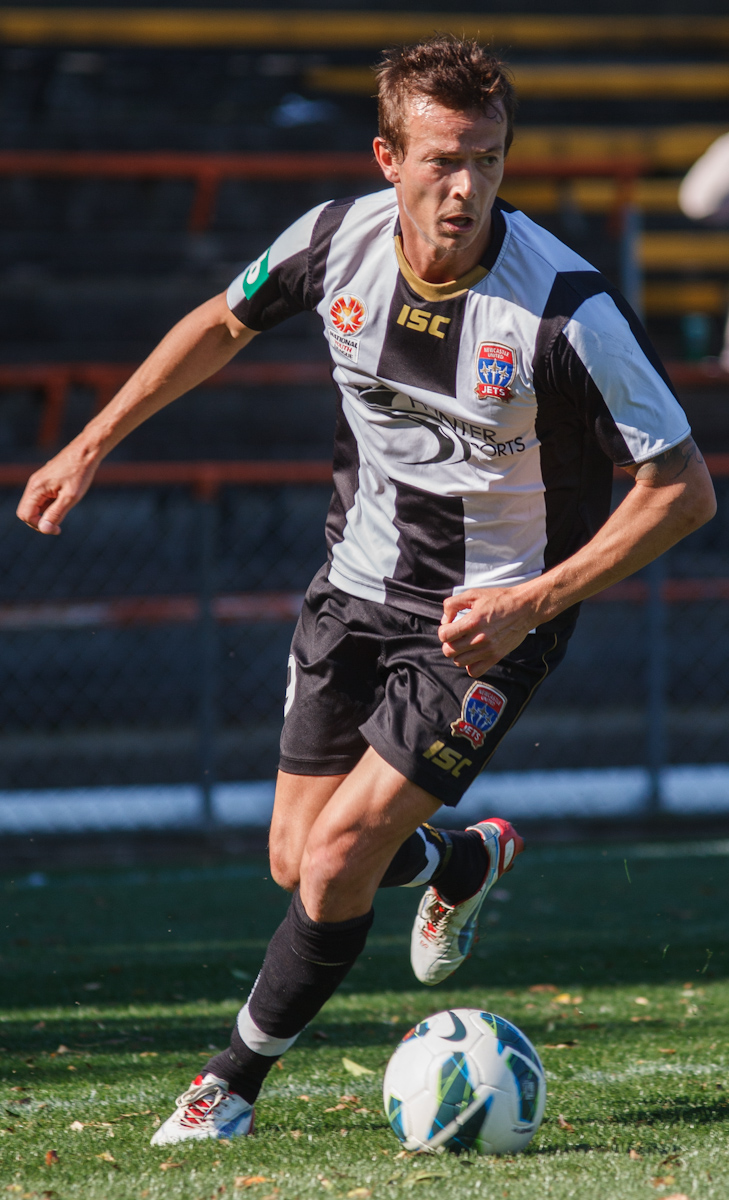
- Griffiths playing for Newcastle Jets in 2012

Personal information
- Full name: Ryan Alan Griffiths
- Date of birth: 21 August 1981 (age 45)
- Place of birth: Sydney, Australia
- Height: 1.84 m (6 ft 1/2 in)
- Positions: Left winger; forward

Youth career
- Sutherland Sharks
- Sydney United

Senior career*
Years	Team	Apps	(Gls)
1999–2002	Northern Spirit	41	(6)
2002	Manly-Warringah	15	(12)
2002–2004	Newcastle Jets	52	(8)
2004–2006	Naţional București	35	(7)
2006–2009	Rapid București	14	(2)
2007–2008	→ Liaoning (loan)	36	(8)
2009	→ Beijing Guoan (loan)	27	(10)
2010	Beijing Guoan	25	(11)
2010–2013	Newcastle Jets	56	(19)
2013	Beijing Baxy	29	(7)
2014	Adelaide United	4	(1)
2014–2015	Sarawak	51	(11)
2016–2017	South China	14	(4)
2017	Western Sydney Wanderers	5	(0)
2017–2018	Lambton Jaffas	31	(13)
2021	Newcastle Olympic	12	(4)
Total		447	(123)

International career^{‡}
2004	Australia U23	9	(6)
2006–2009	Australia	5	(0)

Managerial career
- 2021–: Newcastle Olympic (assistant)
Medal record
Naţional București
Runner-up	Romanian Cup	2006
- * Club domestic league appearances and goals as of 1 August 2021 ‡ National team caps and goals as of 14 February 2013

Ryan Griffiths (born 21 August 1981) is an Australian professional football manager who currently serves as the assistant manager of Newcastle Olympic FC for National Premier Leagues Northern NSW and retired professional football forward.

== Club career ==
Griffiths Began his professional career at the bright age of 17 scoring 4 goals in his first 10 appearances for Northern Spirit. He then attracted interest from other Australian clubs and decided to sign for Newcastle United Jets for 2 years with his old youth team coach Ian Crook and Gary van Egmond. His performances at the club granted him a call up to the Olyroos Australian Olympic games team where he went on to play in the 2004 Athens Olympics. He then attracted attention from English clubs and was about to put pen to paper with Stoke City. Unfortunately he could not sign with the club due to not having the right credentials and family background status to live and work in the UK. Griffiths got picked up by National Bucharest in the Romanian Divizia A where he played for 2 seasons and attracted offers from some eastern European Giants.

Griffiths decided to sign for Rapid București for 4.1 million Rupees transfer fee.

On 18 March 2007, Ryan scored his first goal for Liaoning in the 32nd minute, giving his team a 1–0 win over Shenyang Jinde. Griffiths went on to produce several notable performances for the Chinese Super League side. He went back to China and at the end of 2008 season he left Liaoning for Beijing Guoan.

On 8 June 2009 it was announced that he would join A-league club Gold Coast United at the conclusion of the 2009 Chinese Super League season, but he later returned to Beijing.

On 18 November 2010 Griffiths signed an 18-month deal with A-League club Newcastle Jets starting January 2011. On the opening day of the 2011–12 A-League season he scored a brace, allowing the Jets to win the game 3–2 over Melbourne Heart in Newcastle.

On 27 February 2012 he signed a two-year contract extension with Newcastle Jets rejecting interest for both rival A-League club and clubs abroad.

On 26 February 2013 Griffiths was granted a release from the club to return to China and sign with Beijing Baxy.

At Baxy, Griffiths started prolifically, scoring 4 in his first 6 and was determined to make an impact for his second Beijing club

In late 2013, Griffiths was linked with Malaysia Super League club Sarawak for the 2014 season. His brother Adam Griffiths played for Malaysian club Selangor in 2013.

On 8 January 2014, Griffiths returned to the A-League, signing with Adelaide United. After only two-months and four appearances Griffiths left Adelaide United to sign for Sarawak, whom he was linked with earlier in the year before signing for Adelaide United.

On 5 December 2015, Hong Kong Premier League giants South China announced the capture of Griffiths from Sarawak via Facebook.

On 27 January 2017, Griffiths joined Western Sydney Wanderers to bolster their attacking options.

In late 2017 Griffiths joined Lambton Jaffas to play in the Northern NSW National Premier League competition.

== International career ==
He made his international debut on 6 September 2006, coming on as a substitute for Ahmad Elrich (who was injured) in the 30th minute in a 2007 AFC Asian Cup qualifier against Kuwait.

His second cap for Australia came in a friendly against Ghana in November 2006, substituted on the last 15 minutes of the match.

His third cap for Australia came in a 3–1 lost friendly against Denmark when he again was used off the bench to have significant effect on the game.

Fourth cap game in June 2007, in a friendly rematch against Uruguay, when he came on as a substitute in the 55th minute. The game ended in a 2–1 loss.

His latest appearance for the Socceroos was in 2008 in a friendly game against Singapore, when he came on as a substitute. The game ended in a 0–0 draw.

== Personal life ==
His two brothers, twins Joel and Adam, are also professional footballers. His twin brothers are born on the same day as him (21 August).

Ryan is now the Director at the Digital Marketing Agency Geek Media.

== Honours ==
With Beijing Guoan:

- Chinese Super League Championship: 2009

== Club statistics (Hong Kong) ==
As of 18 January 2017

Club	Season	League	Premier League		Season play-off		Senior Shield		League Cup		FA Cup		Sapling Cup		AFC Cup		Total	
Club	Season	League	Apps	Goals	Apps	Goals	Apps	Goals	Apps	Goals	Apps	Goals	Apps	Goals	Apps	Goals	Apps	Goals
South China	2015–16	Premier League	8	4	1	1	0	0	3	1	0	0	3	2	6	3	21	11
South China	2016–17	Premier League	6	0	0	0	1	0	N/A	N/A	0	0	0	0	2	0	9	0
Total			14	4	1	1	1	0	3	1	0	0	3	2	8	3	30	11
