= Scott Tunbridge =

Australian soccer player

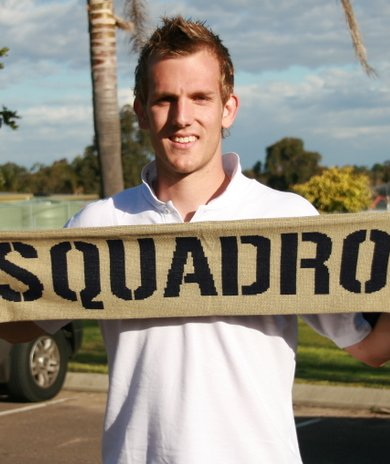
- Tunbridge in 2007

Personal information
- Full name: Scott Tunbridge
- Date of birth: 26 June 1982 (age 44)
- Place of birth: London
- Height: 1.83 m (6 ft 0 in)
- Position: Striker

Senior career*
Years	Team	Apps	(Gls)
2000–2003	Adelaide City	81	(26)
2001	→ Para Hills Knights (loan)	8	(1)
2003–2004	South Melbourne	26	(3)
2004	Cumberland United	4	(1)
2004–2007	Hamilton Academical	67	(13)
2007–2008	Newcastle Jets	5	(1)
2008–2016	MetroStars	134	(112)
2017–2019	Adelaide Raiders	29	(4)
Total		325	(109)
- * Club domestic league appearances and goals as of 9 September 2019 ‡ National team caps and goals as of 23 August 2011

Scott Tunbridge (born 26 June 1982) is a retired former Australian soccer player who last played for Adelaide Raiders.

== Honours ==
Newcastle Jets

- A-League Championship: 2007–08
