= Adam Griffiths =

Australian soccer player and manager (born 1979)

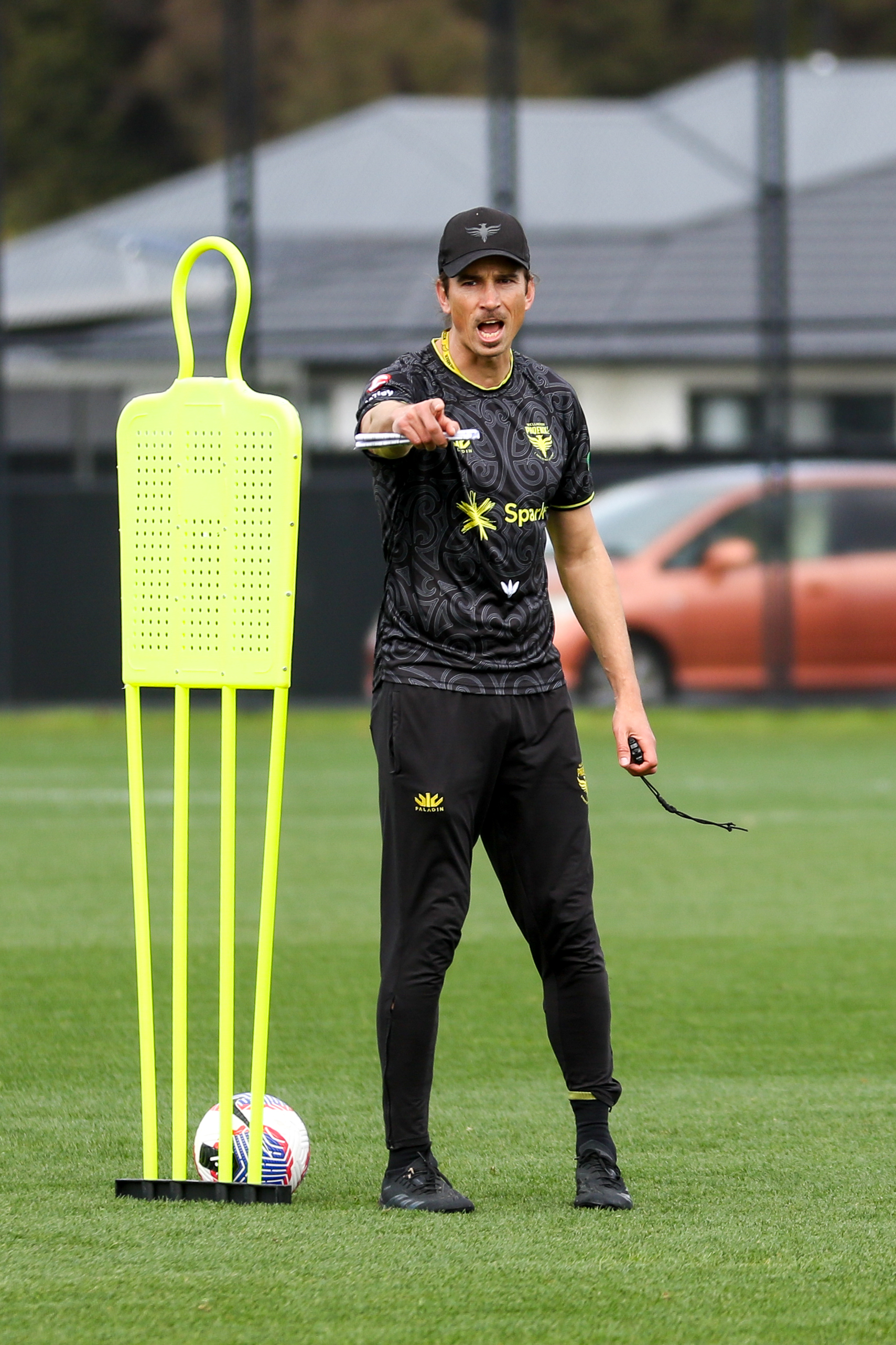
- Adam Griffiths gives instructions at a Wellington Phoenix training session in 2024

Personal information
- Full name: Adam David Griffiths
- Date of birth: 21 August 1979 (age 47)
- Place of birth: Sydney, Australia
- Height: 1.89 m (6 ft 2 in)
- Positions: Midfielder; defender

Youth career
- 1995–1996: Sydney United
- 1997: Sutherland Sharks

Senior career*
Years	Team	Apps	(Gls)
1998	Sutherland Sharks	6	(1)
1999–2001	Northern Spirit	21	(1)
2000	→ Gippsland Falcons (loan)	7	(1)
2001	→ Manly United (loan)	21	(9)
2002–2003	Newcastle Jets	31	(1)
2004–2005	Oostende	27	(0)
2005–2006	Watford	0	(0)
2006	AFC Bournemouth	7	(1)
2006–2007	Brentford	37	(1)
2007–2009	Newcastle Jets	38	(3)
2009	Gold Coast United	1	(0)
2009	Al-Shabab	15	(0)
2010	Adelaide United	8	(0)
2010–2011	Hangzhou Greentown	33	(3)
2012–2013	Sydney FC	18	(0)
2013	Selangor FA	16	(3)
2014–2015	Kedah FA	16	(4)
2015	APIA Leichhardt Tigers	15	(1)

International career^{‡}
2008	Australia	2	(0)

Managerial career
- 2020–2022: Manly United
- 2025–: Perth Glory
- * Club domestic league appearances and goals as of 16 September 2015 ‡ National team caps and goals as of 9 May 2014

Adam Griffiths (born 21 August 1979) is an Australian professional soccer manager and former player who currently serves as the head coach of A-League Men club Perth Glory.

In 2020 he became Head Coach of National Premier Leagues NSW side Manly United. In 2022 he transformed Manly United FC into a dynamic, attacking team that reached the 2021/22 NPL Grand Final, earning him recognition as NPL Coach of the Year. Adam was awarded Coach of the year 2022 at the Football NSW Gold Medal Awards. In July 2022 he was appointed as Assistant Coach at the Western Sydney Wanderers under Mark Rudan. Griffiths helped guide the team to their first finals in seven years and the league’s best defensive record during his debut year as an A-League assistant coach.

== Club career ==
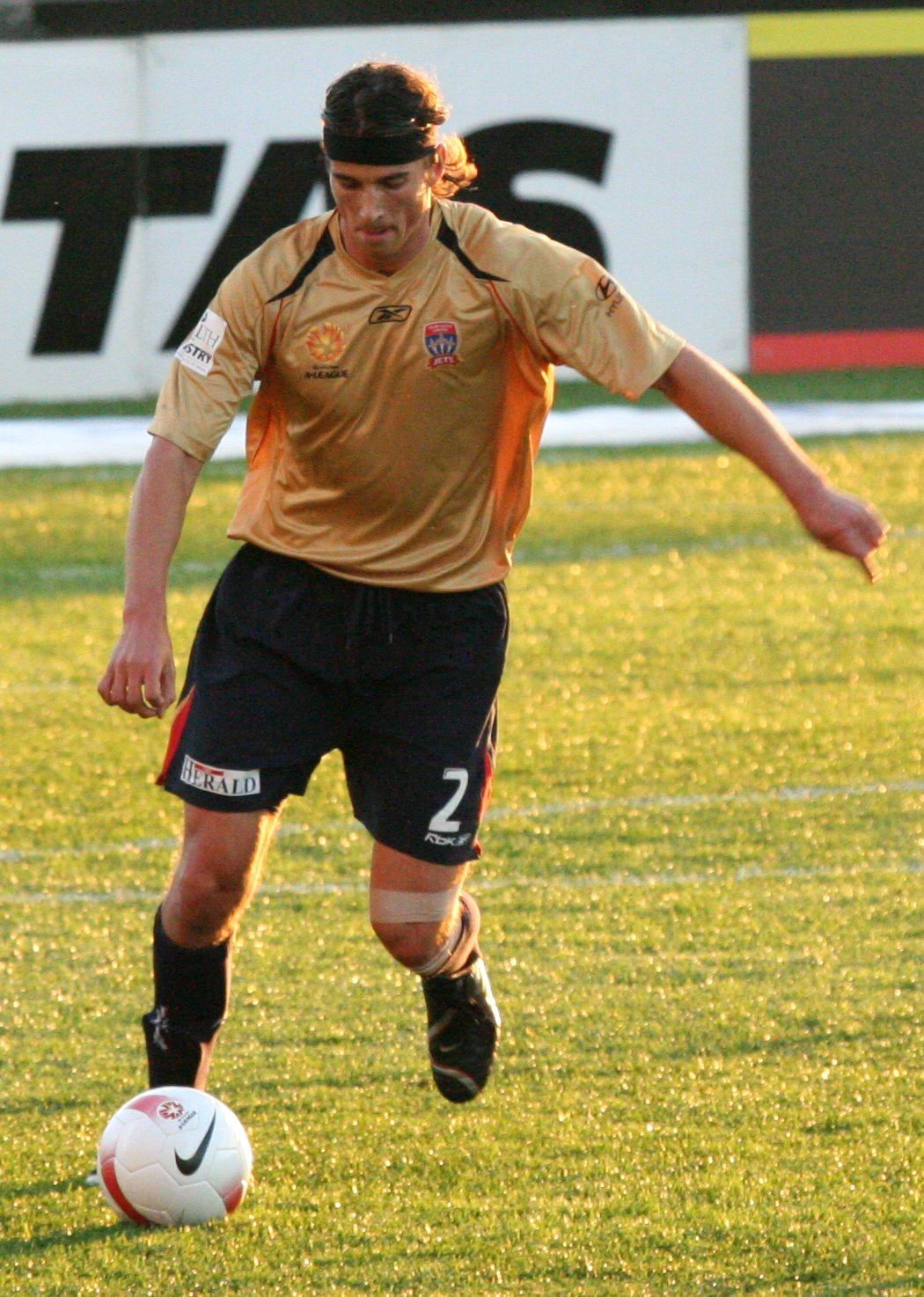
Griffiths playing for the Newcastle Jets in 2007

Griffiths played for a number of Australian clubs before moving to Europe with Belgian club Oostende, and later England with Watford. He moved to another English club, League One side Brentford on 11 July 2006.

Griffiths was released by Brentford on 16 May 2007 and rejoined former club Newcastle Jets the next day. His twin brother Joel Griffiths also played for the Newcastle Jets.

He made his A-League debut in Round 1 of the 2007–08 A-League season against Perth Glory, and scored his first goal in the A-League in Round 5 against Melbourne Victory.

Griffiths signed for the expansion club Gold Coast United, on a three-year contract starting in the 2009/2010 season, but only played one game.

Griffiths moved to Saudi Arabian club Al Shabab, in a deal worth $1.2 million USD a season plus a $650,000 transfer fee.

On 3 February 2010, Griffiths signed with Adelaide United for the club's Asian Champions League campaign.

Later in 2010, Griffiths moved to China to join Hangzhou Greentown (who qualified for the 2011 AFC Champions League after a fourth-place finish in the 2010 CSL season).

On 4 June 2012, Griffiths signed a 1-year deal with Sydney FC. He was released at the conclusion of the 2012–13 A-League season.

Adam joined Malaysian side Selangor FA in April 2013 until the end of the 2013 Malaysian football season.

He signed for APIA Leichhardt for the 2015 season.

== Coaching career ==
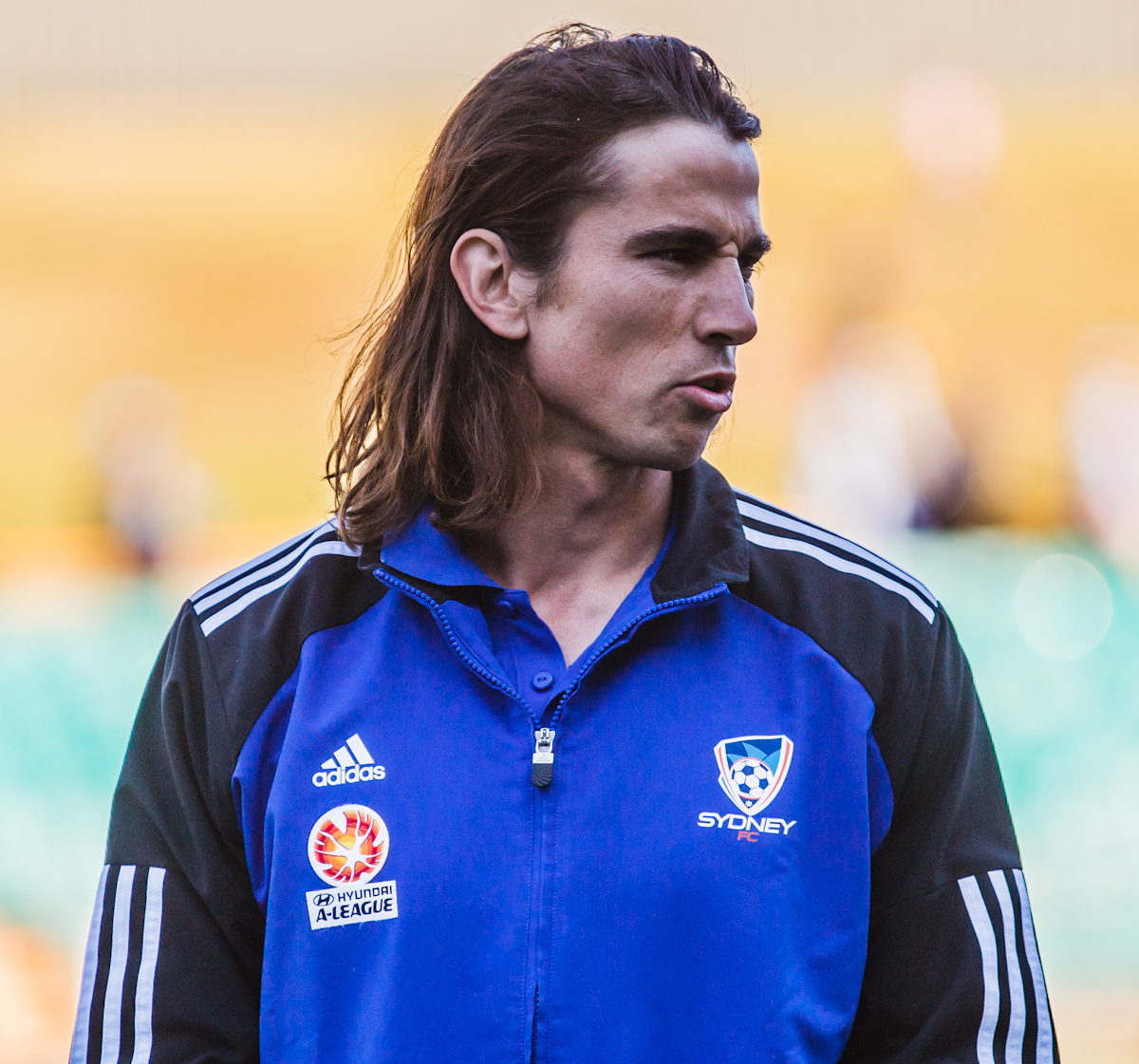
Griffiths with Sydney FC in 2012

In 2016 Griffiths transitioned from a professional football player into coaching, joining first division NSW club, Manly United senior program. In 2020 Griffiths became the Head Coach of Manly United Men's 1st grade team. In his first full season in 2021, he helped steer the club into 3rd position in the league before the season was cut due to COVID disruptions. In the 2022 season, Griffiths transformed the team into a fast, efficient, attacking, passing team, coming within 1 goal difference from Manly United winning the title, finishing 2nd on goal difference. Griffiths achievements attracted the attention of Mark Rudan, Head Coach of Western Sydney Wanderers and on the 5th of July, Griffiths was appointed Assistant Coach of A-League Men club Western Sydney Wanderers.

In July 2025, Griffiths became Assistant Coach at A-League club Perth Glory, alongside head coach David Zdrilic.

In November 2025, he took over as interim head coach following the departure of Zdrilic. Griffiths’ first match as interim head coach ended in a 2–0 defeat to Melbourne Victory.

After winning three of his six matches in charge, Griffiths was appointed head coach on 16 December 2025 until the end of the 2025–26 season, with an option for a longer-term extension. On 13 May 2026, the club announced that Griffiths' contract would be extended a further two seasons.

== Honours ==
Newcastle Jets

- A-League Championship: 2007–08

== Personal life ==
Adam's twin brother, Joel, and younger brother Ryan, are also professional footballers. Adam is also an artist and up-and-coming film director and writer. He is married to actress Lily Brown Griffiths.

== Managerial statistics ==
As of 1 June 2026

Managerial record by team and tenure
Team	From	To	Record				
Team	From	To	P	W	D	L	Win %
Perth Glory FC	November 2025	Present	24	8	6	10	33.33
Total			24	8	6	10	33.33
