= Brent Fisher =

New Zealand footballer (born 1983)

Personal information
- Full name: Brent Fisher
- Date of birth: 6 July 1983 (age 43)
- Place of birth: New Zealand
- Height: 1.85 m (6 ft 1 in)
- Position: Striker

Senior career*
Years	Team	Apps	(Gls)
2000–2002	Canterbury United		(21)
2002–2004	Northern Spirit FC		
2004–2005	Energie Cottbus	2	(0)
2005	IK Start	2	(0)
2006–2007	Canterbury United	9	(7)
2006–2009	Bodens BK	59	(14)
2009	Forrest Hill Milford	13	(3)
2009–2010	Waitakere United	17	(6)
2010–2014	Green Gully	64	(10)
2015	Port Melbourne	16	(1)

International career^{‡}
2002–2006	New Zealand	9	(4)
- * Club domestic league appearances and goals as of 23 September 2015 ‡ National team caps and goals as of 14 April 2008

Brent Fisher (born 6 July 1983) is a New Zealand association football striker who last played for Port Melbourne Sharks in the NPL Victoria.

== Club career ==
Fisher attended Christchurch Boys' High School and turned out for Canterbury United when only 17 years of age. He then played for two seasons in the Australian NSL before moving to Germany's Energie Cottbus in January 2005. He returned to New Zealand after a short spell in Norway, then signed up for another Scandinavian side, Bodens BK.

His 2006 season at Bodens BK was spoilt by an early injury, and some other problems. Following a promising comeback in the Autumn, Fisher and the club decided to sign a renewed contract for 2007, and also for 2008, for a third season. During 2008 he was again injured.

== International career ==
In 1999, he was member of the New Zealand squad at the FIFA Under-17 World Cup held in Auckland.

Fisher made his full All Whites debut as a substitute in an international friendly 2–3 loss to Estonia on 13 October 2002 and ended his international playing career with nine A-international caps and four goals to his credit, his final cap, also a substitute appearance, in a 1–0 win over Malaysia on 19 February 2006.

== Career statistics ==
=== International ===
Appearances and goals by national team and year
National team	Year	Apps	Goals
New Zealand	2002	2	0
New Zealand	2003	–	
New Zealand	2004	5	4
New Zealand	2005	1	0
New Zealand	2006	1	0
Total		9	4

Scores and results list New Zealand's goal tally first, score column indicates score after each Fisher goal.

List of international goals scored by Brent Fisher
No.	Date	Venue	Opponent	Score	Result	Competition
1	31 May 2004	Marden Sports Complex, Adelaide, Australia	Solomon Islands	1–0	3–0	2004 OFC Nations Cup
2	4 June 2004	Marden Sports Complex, Adelaide, Australia	Tahiti	2–0	10–0	2004 OFC Nations Cup
3	4 June 2004	Marden Sports Complex, Adelaide, Australia	Tahiti	3–0	10–0	2004 OFC Nations Cup
4	4 June 2004	Marden Sports Complex, Adelaide, Australia	Tahiti	6–0	10–0	2004 OFC Nations Cup
