= Paul Henderson (soccer) =

Australian soccer player

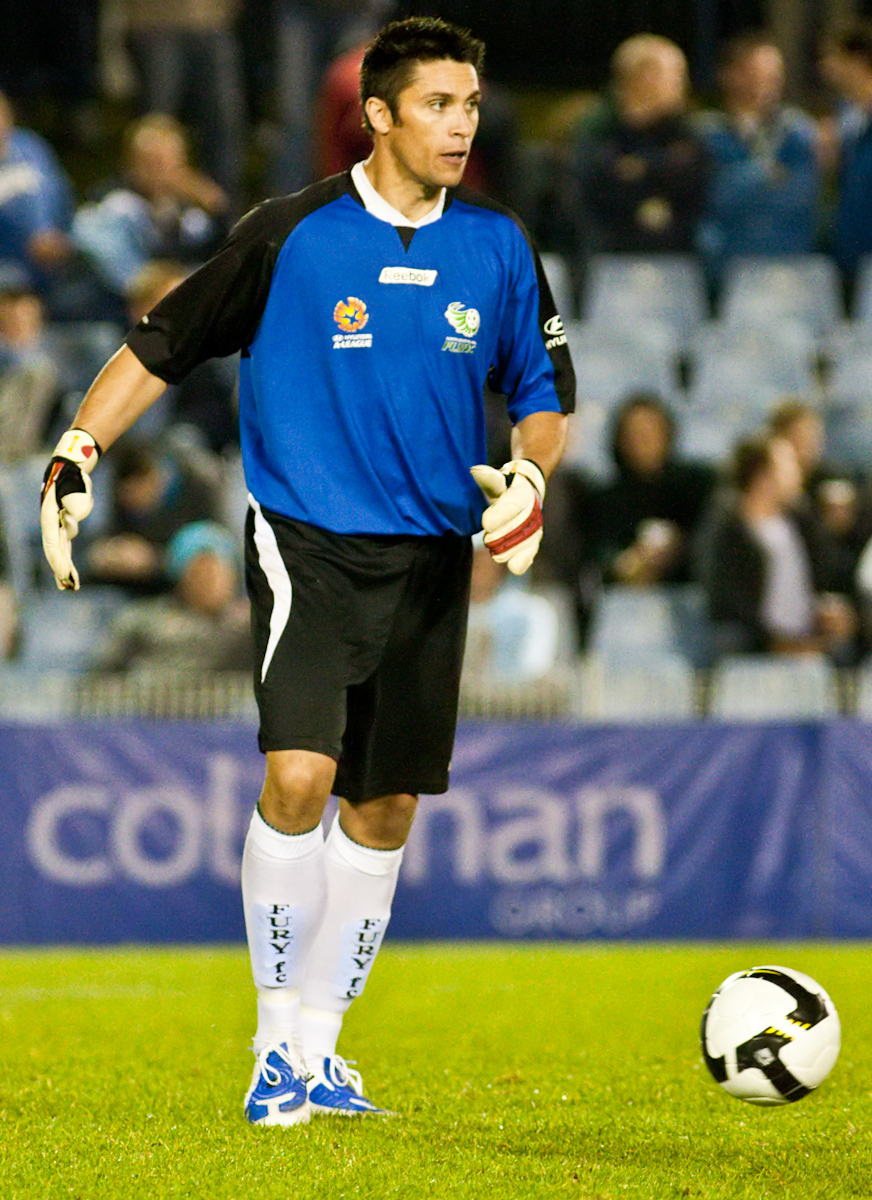

Personal information
- Full name: Paul John Henderson
- Date of birth: 22 April 1976 (age 50)
- Place of birth: Sydney, Australia
- Position: Goalkeeper

Team information
- Current team: Sydney Olympic
- Number: 1

Youth career
- 1994–1996: Sutherland Sharks

Senior career*
Years	Team	Apps	(Gls)
1996–1998	Sutherland Sharks	40	(0)
1998–2004	Northern Spirit	134	(0)
2004	Manly United	6	(0)
2004–2005	Bradford City	40	(0)
2005–2009	Leicester City	63	(0)
2009–2010	North Queensland Fury	14	(0)
2010	Sydney Olympic	15	(0)
2010	Newcastle Jets	0	(0)
2010–2011	Central Coast Mariners	0	(0)
2011–2019	Sydney Olympic	216	(0)
2013	→ Sydney United (loan)	0	(0)
- * Club domestic league appearances and goals as of 23 September 2019

Paul John Henderson (born 22 April 1976) is an Australian footballer who plays for Sydney Olympic FC as a goalkeeper in the National Premier Leagues.

== Club career ==
Henderson started his career in club football in Australia. He played in the New South Wales Premier League for Sutherland before signing for NSL club Northern Spirit until the club became defunct in 2004.

=== Bradford City ===
Henderson then moved to England in July 2004 and had an unsuccessful trial with Blackpool, before signing for Bradford City in August on a one-year contract. He initially came to England for a trial at Ipswich Town and met a goalkeeper coach there, who put him in touch with an agent who brought him to Bradford.

Henderson's form later attracted the interest of Nottingham Forest, who sent scouts to assess him. However, a 4–1 defeat to Milton Keynes Dons convinced the club to think otherwise, while then-manager of Bradford Colin Todd believed Henderson was distracted by the transfer news. Despite impressing during his time at Bradford, Henderson rejected the club's three-year contract renewal offer, instead joining Leicester City on trial on 6 May.

=== Leicester City ===
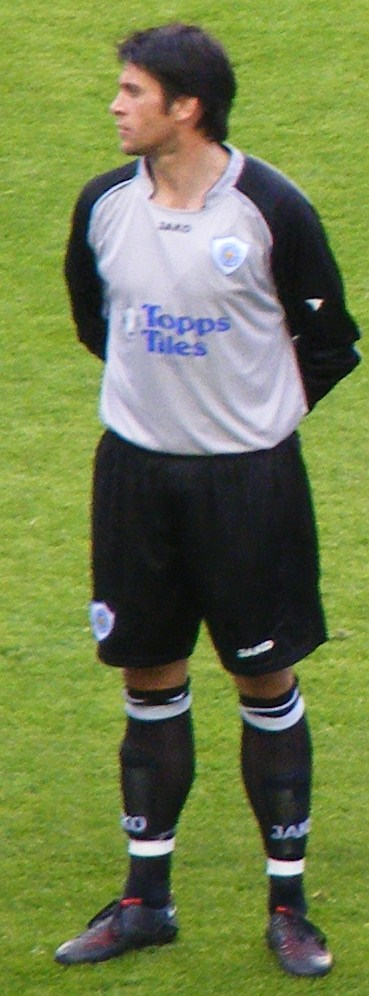
Henderson playing for Leicester City

Henderson signed a two-year contract with Leicester City on a free transfer in the summer of 2005. He joined fellow Australians Patrick Kisnorbo, James Wesolowski and then-teammate Danny Tiatto in the squad. Henderson was brought to Leicester as an understudy to Rab Douglas, stating he was "willing to fight for his place" and that he felt Leicester was a club "moving in the right direction". After Douglas came under criticism for inconsistent performances, Henderson had a run of matches in the first team under new boss Rob Kelly, making 15 appearances during the 2005–06 season.

At the start of the 2006–07 season, Henderson played himself into the first choice position, and despite losing his place for a short term to Conrad Logan he soon regained his spot in the team. Despite conceding 36 goals in 28 league games, Leicester nevertheless survived relegation. With Henderson's contract close to expiring, he attracted the interest of Wigan, Aston Villa and Norwich in the January transfer window. He later allayed any fears of leaving by signing a new two-year contract with Leicester on 16 January.

With the loan signings of goalkeepers Márton Fülöp and Ben Alnwick, Henderson spent much of the 2007–08 season on the substitute's bench. He managed to play a total of 14 league games, conceding 16 goals and making 5 clean sheets as Leicester were relegated at the end of the season.

In the 2008–09 season, Henderson's first team place was shared with loan signing David Martin. He started the first game of the season against Milton Keynes Dons, keeping a clean sheet in a 2–0 victory. On 23 September 2008, he saved two shots from a penalty shoot-out in a Football League Trophy match against Lincoln, with Leicester winning 3–1 on penalties. However, Henderson conceded two goals in the next round in a 2–0 defeat to Rotherham United, a match which manager Nigel Pearson described as their worst performance of the season. After a show of poor form from David Martin, Henderson was given a run in the first team in November 2008, but suffered a groin injury that same month in a 2–1 win at Scunthorpe United, which would turn out to be his last appearance for the club. David Martin suffered an injury himself in February 2009, resulting in the club eventually having to sign three goalkeepers on loan, including David Stockdale and Tony Warner. Nonetheless, he was presented with a medal on 24 April after Leicester had won the League One title.

On 28 April, it was reported that manager Nigel Pearson had told Henderson he can leave the following summer alongside fellow Australian Patrick Kisnorbo as the club begin their preparations for their Championship campaign the following season. On 29 May, he was released at the end of his contract by Leicester alongside Marc Edworthy, Patrick Kisnorbo, Bruno Ngotty and Barry Hayles.

=== North Queensland Fury ===
Henderson was signed up by Australian side North Queensland Fury after being released by Leicester City. His form for North Queensland's first season was mixed. Henderson played an instrumental role when the Fury defeated Gold Coast United 2–0 on 31 October 2009, after Gold Coast defeated the Fury 5–0 in their other meeting earlier in the season. The goalkeeping position went back and forth between Henderson and Justin Pasfield throughout the season.

=== Sydney Olympic ===
Henderson was signed on a short-term contract at the club. He later returned to Belmore Sports Ground and won the Blues' first NSW Premier League title since their relegation from the National Soccer League in 2011, against Sydney United in front of a 10,000+ crowd (which was estimated as closer to 16,000, as officials had to open the gates and delay the kickoff by almost an hour as they had only printed 10,000 admissions). Henderson won NSWPL Goalkeeper of the Year in 2012 following a superb season between the sticks for the Blues. In late-2012 he committed to the club for seasons 2013 and 2014, potentially seeing him finish his career with Olympic.

=== Newcastle Jets ===
Henderson signed on 6 June 2010 a short-term contract with the Newcastle Jets to cover for injured Jets goalkeeper Neil Young for the 2010–2011 A-League season.

=== Central Coast Mariners ===
On 27 August 2010 Henderson signed a six-week contract with the Central Coast Mariners as a temporary replacement for the injured Jess Vanstrattan. His contract was later extended until the end of the season, after which Henderson returned to Sydney Olympic.

== International career ==
Henderson has never played at international level to date. However, he was placed on standby by an initial draft from the Australia national team on 26 September 2006 for forthcoming matches against Paraguay on 7 October and Bahrain the following Wednesday.

== Honours ==
Leicester City

- League One: 2008–09

Sydney Olympic

- NSW Premier League Minor Premiership: 2011
