= Pablo Cardozo =

Association footballer (born 1972)

Personal information
- Date of birth: 23 December 1972 (age 53)
- Place of birth: Buenos Aires, Argentina
- Position: Striker

Senior career*
Years	Team	Apps	(Gls)
1990–1992	Sydney Olympic	35	(3)
1992	→ Warringah Dolphins (loan)	13	(6)
1993	→ CYC Stanmore (loan)	6	(0)
1993–1998	West Adelaide	111	(40)
1998	Rapid Wien	8	(1)
1998–2000	Sydney Olympic	85	(53)
2000	→ Athinaikos (loan)	3	(0)
2001–2002	Northern Spirit	22	(14)
2002–2003	Parramatta Power	25	(8)
2003–2004	Sydney Olympic	22	(9)
2004	Stanmore City Hawks	18	(4)
2004–2005	Sydney United		
2005	Melbourne Knights	1	(0)
2005–2006	Waitakere United		
2006–2007	Sydney United		
2007	Bankstown City		
2007–2008	Oakleigh Cannons	20	(3)
2008	Richmond	23	(21)
2009	Green Gully	21	(4)
2010	Fraser Park FC	9	(2)
2013	Belmore United FC	18	(15)
2014	Inter Lions SC	9	(0)

International career
2000	Australia	4	(1)
Medal record
Men's association football
Representing Australia
OFC Nations Cup
Winner	2000 Tahiti
- * Club domestic league appearances and goals

Pablo Cardozo (born 23 December 1972) is a former soccer player who played as a striker. Born in Argentina, he represented the Australia national team internationally.

== Club career ==
Cardozo played mostly in Australia, but also had unsuccessful spells in Europe and also played in New Zealand with Waitakere United. Cardozo signed with the Green Gully Cavaliers for the 2009 Victorian Premier League season.

Cardozo currently manages a youth team at Sydney Olympic.

== International career ==
Cardozo made four appearances for the Australia national team, debuting against Slovakia in a four-team tournament held in Valparaíso, Chile and scoring once against Solomon Islands.

== Honours ==
Australia

- OFC Nations Cup: 2000
