= Robert Enes =

Australian former soccer player

Personal information
- Full name: Roberto Manuel Enes
- Date of birth: 22 August 1975 (age 51)
- Position: Midfielder

Youth career
- Shepparton United
- Preston Makedonia
- 1992–1993: AIS

Senior career*
Years	Team	Apps	(Gls)
1994	Preston Lions		
1994–1995	Melbourne SC	13	(2)
1995–1997	Sydney United	52	(4)
1997–1998	Portsmouth	5	(0)
1998–2002	Northern Spirit	82	(1)
2002–2003	Marconi Stallions	17	(0)
Total		168	(8)

International career
1995	Australia U20		
1996	Australia U23		
1996–1997	Australia	7	(0)
Medal record
Representing Australia
Men's Association football
OFC Nations Cup
Winner	1996 Oceania
OFC U-20 Championship
Winner	1994 Fiji
- * Club domestic league appearances and goals

Roberto Manuel Enes (born 22 August 1975) is an Australian former soccer player who played at both professional and international levels as a midfielder.

== Club career ==
Enes spent his youth career with Shepparton United, Preston Makedonia and the Australian Institute of Sport. He spent his senior career with Preston Lions, Melbourne SC, Sydney United, Portsmouth, Northern Spirit and Marconi Stallions.

In 1997, Enes moved to Portsmouth F.C. from Sydney United on a £175,000 transfer. Portsmouth initially attempted to get a work permit for Enes, however when this took too long, Enes was granted Portuguese citizenship.

== International career ==
Enes represented the Australian under-20 team at the 1995 FIFA World Youth Championship, and the under-23 team at the 1996 Summer Olympics. He also earned seven caps for the senior team.

== Honours ==
Australia

- OFC Nations Cup: 1996

Australia U-20

- OFC U-20 Championship: 1994
