= North West Sydney Spirit FC =

Australian football club, based in Sydney

NWS Spirit FC
- Full name: NWS Spirit FC
- Nickname: Spirit
- Founded: 2004 (as Gladesville Hornsby)
- Ground: Christie Park
- Manager: Luca Falcone
- League: NPL NSW
- 2026: 6th of 16 (premiers)
- Website: https://spiritfootballclub.com/

North West Sydney Spirit FC is an Australian soccer club based in Macquarie Park, Sydney, New South Wales. It was the successor of the defunct Northern Spirit FC, a professional soccer club based in North Sydney, Sydney, New South Wales.

== History ==
=== Formation of North West Sydney Football Ltd (Gladesville-Hornsby Football Association) ===
The logo of the GHFA Spirit used for its first seasons after reforming.

The former youth teams of Northern Spirit were assembled into the new Gladesville-Hornsby Football Association, nicknamed Spirit FC, in 2004. In 2019 GHFA merged with North West Sydney Women's Football Association to form North West Sydney Football Ltd. NWSF has its homeground at Christie Park in Macquarie Park, New South Wales. In 2007, won the NSW State League Division 1 premiership, but were not selected to be promoted. In 2008, they again won the State League Division 1 and this time were promoted to the Super League for 2009.

In 2013, Football NSW incorporated the National Premier Leagues structure to their competition. GHFA Spirit FC were selected along with 11 other teams to join the new second division of soccer in NSW.

The 2015 season saw Spirit FC crowned premiers of the NPL NSW 2, however due to NSW's promotion criteria, were not eligible.

=== 2022-2025: Promotion and silverware ===
2022 saw Spirit qualify for the NPL NSW for the first time, as well as winning the Waratah Cup, beating Sydney United 2–1 in the final.

After two mid-table seasons in the top flight, Spirit began 2025 in white-hot fashion by winning their first 5 games, and going undefeated across their first 9. Spirit would inevitably secure the premiership in the penultimate game, which qualified them for the inaugural Australian Championship. This included a ruthless 6–3 win over 2024 premiers Rockdale Ilinden, immediately follow a 5-0 demolition of 2024 champions Marconi Stallions at Marconi Stadium. However, a weakened Spirit side would lose to Rockdale Ilinden 1–2 in the preliminary final after extra time.

== Current Men's squad ==
As of 2 October 2026

Note: Flags indicate national team as defined under FIFA eligibility rules; some limited exceptions apply. Players may hold more than one non-FIFA nationality.

No.	Pos.	Nation	Player
1	GK	AUS	Christopher Marques
3	DF	AUS	Kyah Williams
4	MF	AUS	Bradie Smith
5	MF	AUS	Owen Henderson
6	DF	AUS	Corey Kavanagh
7	FW	JPN	Shoki Yoshida
8	MF	AUS	Grant Cornwell
9	FW	AUS	Callum Kealy
12	GK	AUS	Jay Coates
13	DF	AUS	Simon Nicholas

No.	Pos.	Nation	Player
14	DF	AUS	Benjamin Duroux
15	MF	AUS	Sam Armson
16	DF	AUS	Charlie Broomhead
17	DF	AUS	Jake Chidiac
18	MF	AUS	Andre Takami
19	MF	AUS	Zayne Ahluwalia
21	FW	AUS	Finn Ballard-McBride
22	DF	AUS	Stavros Tserpes
30	MF	AUS	Samuel MIlls
31	GK	AUS	Christopher Chen
32	MF	AUS	Thomas Mason
--	FW	AUS	Tristan Hammond
--	MF	JPN	Riku Kobayashi

== Honours ==
- National Premier Leagues NSW
  - Premiership (1): 2025
- National Premier Leagues NSW 2
  - Premiership (1): 2015
- NSW Super League
  - Championship (1): 2009
- Waratah Cup
  - Winners (1): 2022
- Waratah Cup
  - Runners-up (1): 2010

== Notable international players ==
Australia

- Graham Arnold
- Paul Bilokapic
- Matthew Bingley
- Pablo Cardozo
- Luke Casserly
- Sean Cranney
- Robert Enes
- Craig Foster
- Adam Griffiths
- Ryan Griffiths
- Gabriel Mendez
- Mark Milligan
- Scott Ollerenshaw
- Erik Paartalu
- Abbas Saad
- Robbie Slater
- Alex Tobin
- Alex Wilkinson
- Clayton Zane

(Italy)

- Nicola Berti

(Malta)

- John Hutchinson

(New Zealand)

- Brent Fisher

(Scotland)

- Ian Ferguson

(United States)

- Frankie Ljucovic

== Former managers ==
- (Scotland) Lawrie McKinna
- (England) Mick Hickman
- (Australia) Graham Arnold
- David Perkovic
