= 1988 Sydney Croatia FC season =

Sydney Croatia
1988 season
- Chairman: Tony Topic
- Manager: Vedran Rožić
- Stadium: Sydney Croatian Sports Centre
- National Soccer League: 2nd (League); Runner's Up (Final Series)
- 1988 NSL Cup: Semi-Finals
- Top goalscorer: League = Graham Arnold (10), Manis Lamond (10); Overall = Manis Lamond (11)
- Highest home attendance: 8,015 vs. Marconi Fairfield (24 July 1988); National Soccer League
- Lowest home attendance: 1,713 vs. Sunshine George Cross (7 February 1988); National Soccer League
- Average home league attendance: 4,699
- Biggest win: 3-0 vs. Sydney Olympic (1 May 1988); National Soccer League; 3-0 vs. Wollongong City (8 May 1988); National Soccer League; 3-0 vs. Brisbane Lions (17 February 1988); Beach Fashions Cup
- Biggest defeat: 0–4 vs. Brisbane Lions (5 March 1988); National Soccer League

The 1988 season saw Sydney Croatia embark on its fifth campaign in the NSL. They finished second on the table, and made the Grand Final where they finished runner's up.

With Vedran Rožić continuing as player/coach, Sydney Croatia made some significant signings including midfielder Ivan Petković returning from NK Šibenik in Croatia after a season away and defender Alan Hunter from Heidelberg United.

Sydney Croatia finished the regular season in second position on the table on goal difference, behind premiers Wollongong City. In the final series, Croatia made the Grand Final after victories over South Melbourne and Wollongong City. In the Grand Final they faced their neighbour rivals Marconi Fairfield. Both sides were locked at 2-2 after extra-time with goals from Alan Hunter and Manis Lamond. Unfortunately in the penalty shoot out, Sydney Croatia were beaten 5-4.

Graham Arnold and Manis Lamond finished as joint top goalscorers during the season with 10 goals.

== Players ==
Note: Flags indicate national team as defined under FIFA eligibility rules; some limited exceptions apply. Players may hold more than one non-FIFA nationality.

No.	Pos.	Nation	Player
—	FW	AUS	Graham Arnold
—	DF	ENG	Andy Brockbank
—	MF	ARG	Gustavo Cerro
—	MF	AUS	Adrian Ciscato
—	DF	AUS	Shane Clinch
—	MF	ENG	David Fitzharris
—	MF	AUS	Craig Foster
—	GK	AUS	Tony Franken
—	DF	AUS	Alan Hunter
—	FW	AUS	Sean Ingham
—	DF	AUS	Graham Jennings
—	DF	AUS	Mark Jones

No.	Pos.	Nation	Player
—	DF	AUS	John Kero
—	FW	AUS	Tony Krslovic
—	FW	PNG	Manis Lamond
—	MF	CRO	Ivan Petković
—	MF	AUS	David Rezo
—	MF	CRO	Vedran Rožić (Captain)
—	MF	AUS	Dragan Božić
—	MF	AUS	Wally Savor
—	MF	AUS	Robbie Slater
—	MF	AUS	Manny Spanoudakis
—	GK	AUS	Greg Woodhouse

=== Transfers in ===
No.	Pos.	Nat.	Name	Age	Moving from	Type	Transfer window	Ends	Transfer fee	Source
	DF	(Australia)	Alan Hunter	23	Heidelberg United (Australia)	Transfer	Pre-season		$23,000	
	MF	(Croatia)	Ivan Petković	27	NK Šibenik (Croatia)	Transfer	Pre-season		Undisclosed	
	MF	(Australia)	Manny Spandounakis	22	Sydney Olympic (Australia)	Transfer	Pre-season		Undisclosed	
	FW	(Australia)	Sean Ingham	22	Newcastle Rosebud (Australia)	Transfer	Pre-season		Undisclosed	
	MF	(Australia)	Craig Foster	18	AIS (Australia)	Transfer	Pre-season		Free	

=== Transfers out ===
No.	Pos.	Nat.	Name	Age	Moving to	Type	Transfer window	Transfer fee	Source
	MF	(Australia)	Zarko Odzakov	32	Blacktown City (Australia)	Transfer	Pre-season	Undisclosed	
	DF	(Croatia)	Ante Rumora	27	Free agent	End of Contract	Pre-season	Free	
	MF	(Australia)	Ray Vliestra	23	Wollongong City (Australia)	Transfer	Pre-season	$15,000	

=== Mid-Season Gains ===
No.	Pos.	Nat.	Name	Age	Moving from	Type	Transfer window	Ends	Transfer fee	Source
	DF	(England)	Andy Brockbank	26	Barrow A.F.C. (England)	Transfer	Mid-season		Free	

=== Overview ===
Competition	First match	Last match	Starting round	Final position	Record							
Competition	First match	Last match	Starting round	Final position	Pld	W	D	L	GF	GA	GD	Win %
National Soccer League	30 January 1988	7 August 1988	Matchday 1	2nd	26	15	4	7	38	30	+8	57.69
National Soccer League Final Series	16 August 1988	3 September 1988	Preliminary Semi-Final	2nd	3	2	0	1	4	3	+1	66.67
Beach Fashions Cup	17 February 1988	6 April 1988	Second Round	Semi-Final	2	1	0	1	4	2	+2	50.00
Total					31	18	4	9	46	35	+11	58.06

Last updated: complete
Source: Competitions

==== League table ====
Pos	Team	Pld	W	D	L	GF	GA	GD	Pts	Qualification or relegation
1	Wollongong City	26	13	8	5	44	32	+12	34	Qualification for the Finals series
2	Sydney Croatia	26	15	4	7	38	30	+8	34	Qualification for the Finals series
3	South Melbourne	26	13	8	5	36	29	+7	34	Qualification for the Finals series
4	Marconi Fairfield (C)	26	12	8	6	46	26	+20	32	Qualification for the Finals series
5	Sydney Olympic	26	9	9	8	28	22	+6	27	Qualification for the Finals series
6	Adelaide City	26	10	7	9	36	35	+1	27	
7	Sunshine George Cross	26	11	5	10	38	39	−1	27	
8	St George-Budapest	26	10	6	10	41	35	+6	26	
9	Melbourne Croatia	26	9	6	11	28	33	−5	24	
10	Footscray JUST	26	7	9	10	34	32	+2	23	
11	APIA Leichhardt	26	8	7	11	28	35	−7	23	
12	Preston Makedonia	26	5	12	9	29	35	−6	22	
13	Brunswick Juventus (R)	26	7	5	14	31	43	−12	19	Relegation to the Victorian State League
14	Brisbane Lions (R)	26	4	4	18	28	59	−31	12	Relegation to the Brisbane Premier League

Source: rsssf.com
Rules for classification: 1) points; 2) goal difference; 3) number of goals scored.
(C) Champions; (R) Relegated

==== Matches ====
30 January 1988 1	Sydney Olympic	3–0	Sydney Croatia	Parramatta, New South Wales
	Pontidas 47'; Patalis 70'; Saad 80'	Report		Stadium: Parramatta Stadium; Attendance: 7,883; Referee: Gary Power

7 February 1988 2	Sydney Croatia	1–0	Sunshine George Cross	Edensor Park, New South Wales
	Petkovic 3'	Report		Stadium: Sydney Croatian Sports Centre; Attendance: 1,713; Referee: Richard Lorenc

13 February 1988 3	Preston Makedonia	0–2	Sydney Croatia	Melbourne, Victoria
		Report	Krslovic 15', 53'	Stadium: Olympic Park; Attendance: 3,204; Referee: Chris Bambridge

20 February 1988 4	Sydney Croatia	4–2	APIA Leichhardt	Edensor Park, New South Wales
	Jennings 59'; Arnold 63'; Slater 81'; Ingham 85'	Report	Bertogna 47' (pen); Brown 67'	Stadium: Sydney Croatian Sports Centre; Attendance: 4,242; Referee: Gary Power

28 February 1988 5	Sydney Croatia	1–0	Adelaide City	Edensor Park, New South Wales
	Foster 57'	Report		Stadium: Sydney Croatian Sports Centre; Attendance: 3,595; Referee: John McConnell

5 March 1988 6	Brisbane Lions	4–0	Sydney Croatia	Richlands, Queensland
	Stewart 1' (pen); Meredith 30', 75', 83'	Report		Stadium: Richlands Stadium; Attendance: 1,050; Referee: Bill Monteverde

13 April 1988 7	Melbourne Croatia	1–1	Sydney Croatia	Melbourne, Victoria
	Lewis 55'	Report	Arnold 81'	Stadium: Olympic Park; Attendance: 975; Referee: Dennis Voutsinas

20 April 1988 8	Sydney Croatia	3–1	Brunswick Juventus	Edensor Park, New South Wales
	Clinch 25'; Lamond 54'; Arnold 72'	Report	Palatsides 64' (pen)	Stadium: Sydney Croatian Sports Centre; Attendance: 3,000; Referee: Terry Seacy

3 April 1988 9	Footscray JUST	3–0	Sydney Croatia	Albert Park, Victoria
	Crino 43'; Dimoski 56', 65'	Report		Stadium: Middle Park Stadium; Attendance: 1,500; Referee: Jim Fearn

10 April 1988 10	Sydney Croatia	1–3	South Melbourne	Edensor Park, New South Wales
	Lamond 4'	Report	Postecoglou 37', 78'; Wright 62'	Stadium: Sydney Croatian Sports Centre; Attendance: 1,850; Referee: John McConnell

17 April 1988 11	Marconi Fairfield	1–1	Sydney Croatia	Bossley Park, New South Wales
	Nastevski 73'	Report	Lamond 52'	Stadium: Marconi Stadium; Attendance: 4,390; Referee: Gary Power

24 April 1988 12	St George-Budapest	0–1	Sydney Croatia	Banksia, New South Wales
		Report	Lamond 50'	Stadium: St George Stadium; Attendance: 4,200; Referee: John Fraser

1 May 1988 13	Sydney Croatia	3–0	Sydney Olympic	Edensor Park, New South Wales
	Hunter; Lamond; Arnold	Report		Stadium: Sydney Croatian Sports Centre; Attendance: 5,556; Referee: Rob Davies

8 May 1988 14	Wollongong City	0–3	Sydney Croatia	Heidelberg West, Victoria
		Report	Lamond 6'; Arnold 14'; Slater 48'	Stadium: Olympic Village; Attendance: 4,755; Referee: Bob Marshall

15 May 1988 15	Sunshine George Cross	1–0	Sydney Croatia	Sunshine, Victoria
	Carter 6'	Report		Stadium: Chaplin Reserve; Attendance: 1,665; Referee: John Fraser

22 May 1988 16	Sydney Croatia	3–2	Preston Makedonia	Edensor Park, New South Wales
	Lamond 2'; Arnold 43'; Slater 47'	Report	Smith 3'; Dimovski 56'	Stadium: Sydney Croatian Sports Centre; Attendance: 5,000; Referee: Dennis Voutsinas

29 May 1988 17	APIA Leichhardt	0–1	Sydney Croatia	Leichhardt, New South Wales
		Report	Bertogna (own goal) 43'	Stadium: Lambert Park; Attendance: 4,532; Referee: Gary Power

5 June 1988 18	Adelaide City	2–3	Sydney Croatia	Kensington, South Australia
	Villani 5'; Tobin 78'	Report	Slater 35'; Lamond 87'; Arnold 89'	Stadium: Olympic Sports Field; Attendance: 3,200; Referee: Jim Rossis

11 June 1988 19	Sydney Croatia	1–0	Brisbane Lions	Edensor Park, New South Wales
	Arnold 15'	Report		Stadium: Sydney Croatian Sports Centre; Attendance: 3,000; Referee: Bernie Upjohn

19 June 1988 20	Sydney Croatia	2–0	Melbourne Croatia	Edensor Park, New South Wales
	Arnold 7'; Clinch 29'	Report		Stadium: Sydney Croatian Sports Centre; Attendance: 6,854; Referee: Alan Kibbler

June 25 1988 21	Brunswick Juventus	2–0	Sydney Croatia	Heidelberg West, Victoria
	Egan 7'; Palatsides 12'	Report		Stadium: Olympic Village; Attendance: 1,536; Referee: Jim Fearn

3 July 1988 22	Sydney Croatia	2–0	Footscray JUST	Edensor Park, New South Wales
	Lamond 21'; Clinch 66'	Report		Stadium: Sydney Croatian Sports Centre; Attendance: 5,623; Referee: Gary Power

27 July 1988 23	South Melbourne	1–0	Sydney Croatia	Heidelberg West, Victoria
	Trimboli 10'	Report		Stadium: Olympic Park; Attendance: 2,975; Referee: Chris Bambridge

24 July 1988 24	Sydney Croatia	3–2	Marconi Fairfield	Edensor Park, New South Wales
	Hunter 25' (pen); Slater 53'; Henderson own goal 60'	Report	Gray 57'; Farina 80' (pen)	Stadium: Sydney Croatian Sports Centre; Attendance: 8,015; Referee: Don Campbell

31 July 1988 25	Sydney Croatia	1–1	St George-Budapest	Edensor Park, New South Wales
	Arnold 82'	Report	Ilic 72'	Stadium: Sydney Croatian Sports Centre; Attendance: 5,937; Referee: Gary Power

7 August 1988 26	Sydney Croatia	1–1	Wollongong City	Edensor Park, New South Wales
	Jones 90+2'	Report	Ratcliffe 79'	Stadium: Sydney Croatian Sports Centre; Attendance: 6,702; Referee: Richard Lorenc

=== NSL Final Series ===
16 August 1988 Preliminary Semi-Final	Sydney Croatia	2–1	South Melbourne	Edensor Park, New South Wales
	Ingham 72'; Jones 97'	Report	Postecoglou 30' (pen)	Stadium: Sydney Croatian Sports Centre; Attendance: 4,561; Referee: John McConnell

21 August 1988 Major Semi-Final	Wollongong City	0–0 (3-4 pens)	Sydney Croatia	Bossley Park, New South Wales
		Report		Stadium: Marconi Stadium; Attendance: 7,106; Referee: Rob Davies

3 September 1988 Grand Final	Sydney Croatia	2–2 (4-5 pens)	Marconi Fairfield	Parramatta, New South Wales
	Hunter 57'; Lamond 108'	Report	Calderan 39'; Nastevski 117' (pen)	Stadium: Parramatta Stadium; Attendance: 17,064; Referee: Chris Bambridge

=== Beach Fashions Cup ===
17 February 1988 Second round	Sydney Croatia	3–0	Brisbane Lions	Parramatta, New South Wales
	Slater 46'; Hunter (pen); Lamond	Report		Stadium: Parramatta Stadium; Attendance: 3,994; Referee: Rob Davies

6 April 1988 Semi-Final	APIA Leichhardt	2–1	Sydney Croatia	Bossley Park, New South Wales
	Phillips 64'; Ward 90+1'	Report	Slater 20'	Stadium: Marconi Stadium; Attendance: 3,866; Referee: Don Campbell

== Statistics ==
=== Appearances and goals ===
Players with no appearances not included in the list.

No.	Pos.	Nat.	Name	National Soccer League		Final Series		NSL Cup		Total	
No.	Pos.	Nat.	Name	Apps	Goals	Apps	Goals	Apps	Goals	Apps	Goals
—	FW	(Australia)	Graham Arnold	24	10	3	0	1	0	28	10
—	MF	(Australia)	Dragan Božić	1	0	0	0	0	0	1	0
—	DF	(England)	Andy Brockbank	0	0	1	0	0	0	1	0
—	MF	(Australia)	Adrian Ciscato	2	0	0	0	0	0	2	0
—	DF	(Australia)	Shane Clinch	23	3	3	0	1	0	27	3
—	MF	(England)	David Fitzharris	4	0	0	0	1	0	5	0
—	MF	(Australia)	Craig Foster	18	1	3	0	2	0	23	1
—	GK	(Australia)	Tony Franken	24	0	3	0	2	0	29	0
—	DF	(Australia)	Alan Hunter	23	3	3	1	2	1	28	5
—	FW	(Australia)	Sean Ingham	13	1	3	1	1	0	17	2
—	DF	(Australia)	Graham Jennings	24	1	3	0	2	0	29	1
—	DF	(Australia)	Mark Jones	25	1	3	1	2	0	30	2
—	FW	(Australia)	Tony Krslovic	15	2	0	0	1	0	16	2
—	FW	(Papua New Guinea)	Manis Lamond	19	10	3	1	2	0	24	11
—	MF	(Croatia)	Ivan Petković	21	0	3	0	1	0	25	0
—	MF	(Australia)	David Rezo	18	0	1	0	2	1	21	1
—	MF	(Croatia)	Vedran Rožić	22	1	3	0	2	0	27	1
—	FW	(Australia)	John Kero	1	0	0	0	0	0	1	0
—	MF	(Australia)	Wally Savor	22	0	1	0	1	0	24	0
—	MF	(Australia)	Robbie Slater	24	5	3	0	2	2	29	7
—	GK	(Australia)	Greg Woodhouse	1	0	0	0	0	0	1	0
