= 1989 Sydney Croatia FC season =

Sydney Croatia
1989 season
- Chairman: Rade Čikeš
- Manager: Vedran Rožić
- Stadium: Sydney Croatian Sports Centre
- National Soccer League: 7th
- 1989 NSL Cup: First Round
- Top goalscorer: Graham Arnold (5)
- Highest home attendance: 8,009 vs. Marconi Fairfield (12 February 1989); National Soccer League
- Lowest home attendance: 1,508 vs. Heidelberg United (5 July 1989); National Soccer League
- Average home league attendance: 3,674
- Biggest win: 2-0 vs. Adelaide City (29 January 1989); National Soccer League; 2-0 vs. Blacktown City (28 June 1989); National Soccer League; 3-1 vs. Melbourne City JUST (27 May 1989); National Soccer League; 3-1 vs. APIA Leichhardt (June 11 1989); National Soccer League
- Biggest defeat: 0–3 vs. Marconi Fairfield (10 May 1989); National Soccer League; 0-3 vs. St George-Budapest (25 June 1989); National Soccer League

The 1989 season saw Sydney Croatia embark on its sixth campaign in the NSL. They finished 7th on the ladder.

Following a successful 1988 campaign in which Sydney Croatia finished runners-up in the NSL Grand Final to Marconi Fairfield, player-coach Vedran Rožić retained the majority of the squad for the 1989 season. Despite high expectations, the club experienced inconsistent form and ultimately failed to qualify for the finals series.

Rožić departed Sydney Croatia at the end of the season, concluding a notable tenure that included winning the 1986 Northern Conference NSL Premiership, the 1987 NSL Cup, and guiding the team to the 1988 Grand Final. His leadership left a lasting legacy at the club.

The club's top goalscorer for the season was Graham Arnold, who scored five goals.

== Players ==
Note: Flags indicate national team as defined under FIFA eligibility rules; some limited exceptions apply. Players may hold more than one non-FIFA nationality.

No.	Pos.	Nation	Player
—	FW	AUS	Graham Arnold
—	DF	AUS	Shane Clinch
—	MF	AUS	Craig Foster
—	GK	AUS	Tony Franken
—	DF	AUS	Alan Hunter
—	FW	AUS	Sean Ingham
—	DF	AUS	Graham Jennings
—	DF	AUS	Mark Jones
—	GK	AUS	John Krajnović
—	FW	AUS	Tony Krslovic
—	FW	PNG	Manis Lamond
—	DF	AUS	Blago Milićević

No.	Pos.	Nation	Player
—	DF	AUS	Nick Orlić
—	MF	CRO	Ivan Petković
—	MF	AUS	David Rezo
—	MF	CRO	Vedran Rožić (Captain)
—	DF	CRO	Ante Rumora
—	MF	AUS	Wally Savor
—	FW	AUS	David Seal
—	MF	AUS	Robbie Slater
—	MF	AUS	Tony Telisman
—	MF	ALB	Burim Zajmi
—	MF	AUS	Ned Zelic

=== Transfers in ===
No.	Pos.	Nat.	Name	Age	Moving from	Type	Transfer window	Ends	Transfer fee	Source
	GK	(Australia)	John Krajnović	23	Wollongong Macedonia (Australia)	Transfer	Pre-season		Free	
	MF	(Australia)	Ned Zelic	17	AIS (Australia)	Transfer	Pre-season		Free	

=== Transfers out ===
No.	Pos.	Nat.	Name	Age	Moving to	Type	Transfer window	Transfer fee	Source
	MF	(Argentina)	Gustavo Cerro	19	Melita Eagles (Australia)	End of Contract	Pre-season	Free	
	GK	(Australia)	Greg Woodhouse	28	Avala (Australia)	End of Contract	Pre-season	Free	
	DF	(England)	Andy Brockbank	27	Avala (Australia)	End of Contract	Pre-season	Free	
	MF	(England)	David Fitzharris	24	Avala (Australia)	End of Contract	Pre-season	Free	
	MF	(Australia)	Manny Spanoudakis	21	Canterbury-Marrickville (Australia)	End of Contract	Pre-season	Free	
	MF	(Australia)	Adrian Cisato	19	Free agent	End of Contract	Pre-season	Free	
	FW	(Australia)	John Kero	24	Free agent	End of Contract	Pre-season	Free	
	MF	(Australia)	Dragan Božić		Free agent	End of Contract	Pre-season	Free	

=== Mid-Season Gains ===
No.	Pos.	Nat.	Name	Age	Moving from	Type	Transfer window	Ends	Transfer fee	Source
	MF	(Croatia)	Ante Rumora	28	Dinamo Zagreb (Croatia)	Transfer	Mid-season		Free	
	MF	(Albania)	Burim Zajmi	28	APIA Leichhardt (Australia)	Transfer	Mid-season		Free	

=== Mid-Season Losses ===
No.	Pos.	Nat.	Name	Age	Moving to	Type	Transfer window	Transfer fee	Source
	FW	(Australia)	Tony Krslovic	19	St George-Budapest (Australia)	Loan	Mid-season	Free	
	FW	(Australia)	Sean Ingham	23	Wollongong City (Australia)	Transfer	Mid-season	Free	
	GK	(Australia)	Mark Bosnich	17	Manchester United (England)	Transfer	Mid-season	Free	

=== Overview ===
Competition	First match	Last match	Starting round	Final position	Record							
Competition	First match	Last match	Starting round	Final position	Pld	W	D	L	GF	GA	GD	Win %
National Soccer League	22 January 1989	16 July 1989	Matchday 1	7th	26	10	8	8	25	25	+0	38.46
NSL Cup	23 March 1989	23 March 1989	First Round	First Round	1	0	0	1	1	2	−1	0.00
Total					27	10	8	9	26	27	−1	37.04

Last updated: complete
Source: Competitions

==== League table ====
Pos	Team	Pld	W	D	L	GF	GA	GD	Pts	Qualification or relegation
5	Preston Makedonia	26	11	8	7	31	24	+7	30	Qualification for the Finals series
6	Adelaide City	26	10	8	8	29	24	+5	28	
7	Sydney Croatia	26	10	8	8	25	25	0	28	
8	South Melbourne	26	9	8	9	44	37	+7	26	
9	Wollongong City	26	8	7	11	22	29	−7	23	

Updated to match(es) played on unknown. Source: rsssf.com
Rules for classification: 1) points; 2) goal difference; 3) number of goals scored.

==== Results summary ====
Overall								Home						Away					
Pld	W	D	L	GF	GA	GD	Pts	W	D	L	GF	GA	GD	W	D	L	GF	GA	GD
26	10	8	8	25	25	0	38	6	4	3	14	12	+2	4	4	5	11	13	−2

==== Matches ====
22 January 1989 1	Sydney Croatia	1–0	Sunshine George Cross	Edensor Park, New South Wales
	Ingham 80'	Report		Stadium: Sydney Croatian Sports Centre; Attendance: 3,000; Referee: Richard Lorenc

26 January 1989 2	South Melbourne Hellas	0–1	Sydney Croatia	Middle Park, Victoria
		Report	Slater 49'	Stadium: Middle Park Stadium; Attendance: 3,200; Referee: Chris Bambridge

29 January 1989 3	Sydney Croatia	2–0	Adelaide City	Edensor Park, New South Wales
	Slater 12'; Arnold 90'	Report		Stadium: Sydney Croatian Sports Centre; Attendance: 5,374; Referee: Bill Monteverde

5 February 1989 4	Wollongong City	1–0	Sydney Croatia	Fairy Meadow, New South Wales
	Easthorpe 13'	Report		Stadium: Brandon Park; Attendance: 4,756; Referee: Peter Spiers

12 February 1989 5	Sydney Croatia	0–0	Sydney Olympic	Edensor Park, New South Wales
		Report		Stadium: Sydney Croatian Sports Centre; Attendance: 8,009; Referee: Chris Bambridge

19 February 1989 6	Melbourne Croatia	0–0	Sydney Croatia	Sunshine North, Victoria
		Report		Stadium: Somers St Stadium; Attendance: 8,000; Referee: John Santa Isabel

26 February 1989 7	Sydney Croatia	2–1	Melbourne City JUST	Edensor Park, New South Wales
	Arnold 9'; Hunter 65' (pen.)	Report	Crino 27'	Stadium: Sydney Croatian Sports Centre; Attendance: 5,923; Referee: Jim Reeves

5 March 1989 8	Heidelberg United	2–0	Sydney Croatia	Heidelberg West, Victoria
	Stubbins 44'; Oulsalkas 81'	Report		Stadium: Olympic Village; Attendance: 3,000; Referee: Dennis Voutsinas

3 May 1989 9	Sydney Croatia	1–2	APIA Leichhardt	Edensor Park, New South Wales
	Savor 54'	Report	Brown 19'; Ricoy 67'	Stadium: Sydney Croatian Sports Centre; Attendance: 2,200; Referee: Alan Townsend

28 June 1989 10	Blacktown City	0–2	Sydney Croatia	Seven Hills, New South Wales
		Report	Jones 40', 84'	Stadium: Gabbie Stadium; Attendance: 875; Referee: Peter Spiers

26 March 1990 11	Sydney Croatia	1–1	St George-Budapest	Edensor Park, New South Wales
	Arnold 19'	Report	Ollerenshaw 17' (pen.)	Stadium: Sydney Croatian Sports Centre; Attendance: 3,451; Referee: John McConnell

10 May 1990 12	Sydney Croatia	0–3	Marconi Fairfield	Edensor Park, New South Wales
		Report	Lowe 29'; Gray 34', 50'	Stadium: Sydney Croatian Sports Centre; Attendance: 3,259; Referee: Jim Reeves

9 April 1989 13	Preston Makedonia	0–0	Sydney Croatia	Melbourne, Victoria
		Report		Stadium: Olympic Park; Attendance: 5,000; Referee: Jim Fearn

22 April 1989 14	Sydney Croatia	2–1	South Melbourne	Edensor Park, New South Wales
	Hunter 18' (pen.); Lamond 77'	Report	Rožić (og) 57'	Stadium: Sydney Croatian Sports Centre; Attendance: 1,753; Referee: Bill Monteverde

30 April 1989 15	Sydney Olympic	1–0	Sydney Croatia	Moore Park, New South Wales
	Ironside 83'	Report		Stadium: Sydney Football Stadium; Attendance: 3,460; Referee: Rob Davies

7 May 1989 16	Sydney Croatia	1–0	Wollongong City	Edensor Park, New South Wales
	Slater 52' (pen.)	Report		Stadium: Sydney Croatian Sports Centre; Attendance: 3,431; Referee: Jim Feirn

14 May 1989 17	Adelaide City	0–0	Sydney Croatia	Kensington, South Australia
		Report		Stadium: Olympic Sports Field; Attendance: 5,100; Referee: Jim Rossis

20 May 1989 18	Sydney Croatia	1–1	Melbourne Croatia	Edensor Park, New South Wales
	Petkovic 74'	Report	Milosevic 57'	Stadium: Sydney Croatian Sports Centre; Attendance: 2,743; Referee: Richard Lorenc

27 May 1989 19	Melbourne City JUST	1–3	Sydney Croatia	Footscray, Victoria
	van Egmond 61'	Report	Arnold 43'; Seal 79'; Lamond 81'	Stadium: Schintler Reserve; Attendance: 1,200; Referee: Don Campbell

5 July 1989 20	Sydney Croatia	1–2	Heidelberg United	Edensor Park, New South Wales
	Lamond 13'		Kanesoulis 37'; Gojevic 55'	Stadium: Sydney Croatian Sports Centre; Attendance: 1,508; Referee: Bill Monteverde

June 11 1989 21	APIA Leichhardt	1–3	Sydney Croatia	Leichhardt, New South Wales
	Kosmina 42'	Report	Seal 10', 40'; Lamond 82'	Stadium: Lambert Park; Attendance: 1,494; Referee: Richard Lorenc

18 June 1989 22	Sydney Croatia	0–0	Blacktown City	Edensor Park, New South Wales
		Report		Stadium: Sydney Croatian Sports Centre; Attendance: 3,709; Referee: Chris Bambridge

25 June 1989 23	St George-Budapest FC	3–0	Sydney Croatia	Edensor Park, New South Wales
	Ollerenshaw 54'; Krslovic 62'; Ratcliffe 76'	Report		Stadium: Sydney Croatian Sports Centre; Attendance: 4,644; Referee: Jim Reeves

2 July 1989 24	Marconi Fairfield	1–1	Sydney Croatia	Bossley Park, New South Wales
	Colagiuri 73'	Report	Foster 12'	Stadium: Marconi Stadium; Attendance: 8,350; Referee: Jim Reeves

9 July 1989 25	Sydney Croatia	2–1	Preston Makedonia	Edensor Park, New South Wales
	Hunter 18' (pen.); Arnold 59'	Report	Jolevski 45'	Stadium: Sydney Croatian Sports Centre; Attendance: 3,408; Referee: Gary Power

16 July 1989 26	Sunshine George Cross	3–1	Sydney Croatia	Sunshine, Victoria
	Lewis 57'; Morley 68'; Latif 76'	Report	Hunter 69'	Stadium: Chaplin Reserve; Attendance: 1,743; Referee: Dennis Voutsinas

=== NSL Cup ===
23 March 1989 First round	Sydney Croatia	1–2	APIA Leichhardt	Edensor Park, New South Wales
	Rezo (?)	Report	Hagan 63'; Brown (?)	Stadium: Sydney Croatian Sports Centre; Attendance: 1,705; Referee: Alan Townsend

== Statistics ==
=== Appearances and goals ===
Players with no appearances not included in the list.

No.	Pos.	Nat.	Name	National Soccer League		NSL Cup		Total	
No.	Pos.	Nat.	Name	Apps	Goals	Apps	Goals	Apps	Goals
—	FW	(Australia)	Graham Arnold	26	5	1	0	27	5
—	DF	(Australia)	Shane Clinch	25	0	1	0	26	0
—	MF	(Australia)	Craig Foster	19	1	1	0	20	1
—	GK	(Australia)	Tony Franken	9	0	1	0	10	0
—	DF	(Australia)	Alan Hunter	24	4	1	0	25	4
—	FW	(Australia)	Sean Ingham	12	1	0	0	12	1
—	DF	(Australia)	Graham Jennings	13	0	1	0	14	0
—	DF	(Australia)	Mark Jones	23	2	0	0	23	2
—	GK	(Australia)	John Krajnović	17	0	0	0	17	0
—	FW	(Australia)	Tony Krslovic	2	0	0	0	2	0
—	FW	(Papua New Guinea)	Manis Lamond	21	4	0	0	21	4
—	DF	(Australia)	Blago Milićević	2	0	0	0	2	0
—	MF	(Croatia)	Ivan Petković	15	1	1	0	16	1
—	MF	(Australia)	David Rezo	18	0	1	1	19	1
—	MF	(Croatia)	Vedran Rožić	20	0	0	0	20	0
—	DF	(Croatia)	Ante Rumora	14	0	1	0	15	0
—	MF	(Australia)	Wally Savor	26	1	0	0	26	1
—	FW	(Australia)	David Seal	5	3	0	0	5	3
—	MF	(Australia)	Robbie Slater	23	3	1	0	24	3
—	MF	(Australia)	Tony Telisman	0	0	1	0	1	0
—	MF	(Australia)	Burim Zajmi	2	0	1	0	3	0
—	MF	(Australia)	Ned Zelic	9	0	1	0	10	0
