= 1989–90 Sydney Croatia FC season =

Sydney Croatia
1989-1990 season
- Chairman: Franjo Bušić
- Manager: Ron Corry (Rd 1-9), Graham Arnold (Rd 10-11), Tony Vržina (Rd 12-26)
- Stadium: Sydney Croatian Sports Centre
- National Soccer League: 7th
- 1989-90 NSL Cup: Second Round
- Top goalscorer: David Seal (15)
- Highest home attendance: 5,452 vs. Marconi Fairfield (29 December 1989); National Soccer League
- Lowest home attendance: 710 vs. Wollongong City (18 April 1990); National Soccer League
- Average home league attendance: 3,938
- Biggest win: 4-0 vs. Wollongong City (18 April 1990); National Soccer League
- Biggest defeat: 0–4 vs. South Melbourne (5 November 1989); National Soccer League

The 1989-90 season saw Sydney Croatia embark on its seventh campaign in the NSL. Ultimately, they finished 7th out of 14 teams.

The team commenced the season with former player Ron Corry at the helm, but his tenure was short-lived, as he was let go after Round 9 due to disappointing results. In response, Graham Arnold stepped into a player-coach role for Rounds 10-11, before Tony Vržina took the reins for the remainder of the season.

Meanwhile, Sydney Croatia's young striker, 18-year-old David Seal, made a significant impact, finishing as the league's top goal scorer in the 1989-1990 NSL season with 15 goals.

At the end of the season, on June 17 1990, Sydney United hosted the touring Hajduk Split, a team that featured the likes of Slaven Bilic, Igor Stimac and Mladen Pralija. In front of over 10,000 spectators, Hajduk Split ran out 2–0 winners.

== Players ==
Note: Flags indicate national team as defined under FIFA eligibility rules; some limited exceptions apply. Players may hold more than one non-FIFA nationality.

No.	Pos.	Nation	Player
—	FW	AUS	Graham Arnold (Captain)
—	DF	AUS	Mark Babic
—	FW	AUS	David Batten
—	GK	AUS	Tony Franken
—	MF	AUS	Andrew French
—	MF	AUS	Steve Gojević
—	DF	AUS	Mike Grbevski
—	DF	AUS	Alan Hunter
—	DF	AUS	Mark Jones
—	DF	CRO	Željko Jurin
—	GK	AUS	Zeljko Kalac
—	GK	AUS	John Krajnović

No.	Pos.	Nation	Player
—	DF	CRO	Velimir Kuprešak
—	FW	PNG	Manis Lamond
—	MF	CRO	Ivan Petković
—	MF	AUS	Tony Popovic
—	MF	AUS	Pedro Ricoy
—	DF	CRO	Ante Rumora
—	GK	AUS	John Russell
—	MF	AUS	Wally Savor
—	FW	AUS	David Seal
—	MF	AUS	Ned Zelic
—	DF	AUS	Ante Žižić (Youth)

=== Transfers in ===
No.	Pos.	Nat.	Name	Age	Moving from	Type	Transfer window	Ends	Transfer fee	Source
	DF	(Australia)	Mike Grbevski	23	St George-Budapest (Australia)	Transfer	Pre-season		$25,000	
	MF	(Australia)	Pedro Ricoy	22	APIA Leichhardt (Australia)	Transfer	Pre-season			
	FW	(Australia)	Steve Gojević	24	Heidelberg United (Australia)	Transfer	Pre-season		$12,000	
	DF	(Croatia)	Velimir Kuprešak	26	St Albans Dinamo (Australia)	Transfer	Pre-season		$12,000	
	GK	(Australia)	John Russell	18	West Wallsend (Australia)	Transfer	Pre-season			

=== Transfers out ===
No.	Pos.	Nat.	Name	Age	Moving to	Type	Transfer window	Transfer fee	Source
	DF	(Croatia)	Vedran Rožić	34	Retirement		Pre-season		
	FW	(Australia)	Robbie Slater	24	Anderlecht (Belgium)	Transfer	Pre-season		
	DF	(Australia)	Graham Jennings	29	APIA Leichhardt (Australia)	Transfer	Pre-season		
	DF	(Australia)	Shane Clinch	25	APIA Leichhardt (Australia)	Transfer	Pre-season		
	MF	(Australia)	Craig Foster	20	Sunshine George Cross (Australia)	End of Contract	Pre-season		
	FW	(Australia)	Tony Krslovic	20	St George-Budapest (Australia)	End of Contract	Pre-season	Free	
	MF	(Australia)	Blago Miličević	18	St George-Budapest (Australia)	End of Contract	Pre-season	Free	
	DF	(Australia)	Adam Ciantar	17	St George-Budapest (Australia)	End of Contract	Pre-season	Free	
	MF	(Australia)	David Rezo	27	Free agent	End of Contract	Pre-season	Free	
	DF	(Australia)	Burim Zajmi	29	Canterbury Marrickville (Australia)	End of Contract	Pre-season	Free	

=== Mid-Season Transfers ===
No.	Pos.	Nat.	Name	Age	Moving from	Type	Transfer window	Ends	Transfer fee	Source
	FW	(Australia)	David Batten	25	Wollongong City (Australia)	Transfer	Mid-season		Undisclosed	
	DF	(Croatia)	Željko Jurin	29	Brunswick Juventus (Australia)	Transfer	Mid-season		Undisclosed	

=== Overview ===
Competition	First match	Last match	Starting round	Final position	Record							
Competition	First match	Last match	Starting round	Final position	Pld	W	D	L	GF	GA	GD	Win %
National Soccer League	5 November 1989	22 April 1990	Matchday 1	7th	26	10	6	10	40	39	+1	38.46
NSL Cup	14 February 1990	14 March 1990	First Round	Second Round	2	1	0	1	4	3	+1	50.00
Total					28	11	6	11	44	42	+2	39.29

Last updated: complete
Source: Competitions

==== League table ====
Pos	Team	Pld	W	D	L	GF	GA	GD	Pts	Qualification or relegation
5	Sydney Olympic (C)	26	12	7	7	40	25	+15	31	Qualification for the Finals series
6	APIA Leichhardt	26	11	9	6	36	25	+11	31	
7	Sydney Croatia	26	10	6	10	40	39	+1	26	
8	Parramatta Eagles	26	10	6	10	31	31	0	26	
9	Preston Makedonia	26	9	5	12	33	35	−2	23	

Updated to match(es) played on unknown. Source: rsssf.com
Rules for classification: 1) points; 2) goal difference; 3) number of goals scored.
(C) Champions

=== Matches ===
5 November 1989 1	South Melbourne	4-0	Sydney Croatia	Melbourne
	Taliadoros 19'; Trimboli 47'; Tsolakis 59'; Wade 86'	Report		Stadium: Middle Park; Attendance: 4,800; Referee: John Lorenc

11 November 1989 2	Sydney Croatia	1-2	St George-Budapest	Sydney
	Arnold 56'	Report	Ilic 70'; Harper 79'	Stadium: Sydney Croatian Sports Centre; Attendance: 3,692; Referee: Gary Power

18 November 1989 3	Sydney Croatia	3-1	Sunshine George Cross	Sydney
	Grbevski 29'; Seal 40'; Hunter 44'	Report	Latif 18'	Stadium: Sydney Croatian Sports Centre; Attendance: 2,652; Referee: Peter Spiers

25 November 1989 4	Adelaide City	3–1	Sydney Croatia	Adelaide
	Shillabeer 18'; Mullen 61'; A.Vidmar 69'	Report	Ricoy 65'	Stadium: Hindmarsh Stadium; Attendance: 3,450; Referee: Jim Rossis

2 December 1989 5	Sydney Croatia	0-0	APIA Leichhardt	Sydney
		Report		Stadium: Sydney Croatian Sports Centre; Attendance: 3,104; Referee: Jim Reeves

10 December 1989 6	Preston Makedonia	2-1	Sydney Croatia	Melbourne
	Woodall 39', 87'	Report	Arnold 89'	Stadium: BT Connor Reserve; Attendance: 3,486; Referee: Jim Rossis

16 December 1989 7	Sydney Croatia	1–2	Sydney Olympic	Sydney
	Seal 62'	Report	Plataniotis 44'; Saad 88'	Stadium: Sydney Croatian Sports Centre; Attendance: 5,172; Referee: Richard Lorenc

23 December 1989 8	Blacktown City Demons	1-2	Sydney Croatia	Sydney
	Arambasic 10'	Report	Hunter 19', 75'	Stadium: Gabbie Stadium; Attendance: 3,124; Referee: Peter Spiers

29 December 1989 9	Sydney Croatia	1-3	Marconi Fairfield	Sydney
	Grbevski 89'	Report	de Jong 16'; Nastevski 28'; Gray 31'	Stadium: Sydney Croatian Sports Centre; Attendance: 5,452; Referee: Dennis Voutsinas

7 January 1990 10	Melbourne Croatia	0-3	Sydney Croatia	Melbourne
		Report	Arnold 15'; Seal 70'; Hunter 78'	Stadium: Somers Street Stadium; Attendance: 8,000; Referee: Jim Reeves

14 January 1990 11	Sydney Croatia	0-2	West Adelaide Hellas	Sydney
		Report	Brazzale 39'; Wright 43'	Stadium: Sydney Croatian Sports Centre; Attendance: 3,862; Referee: Bill Monteverde

21 January 1990 12	Wollongong City	1-3	Sydney Croatia	Wollongong
	Brodnik 80'	Report	Lamond 35'; Seal 50', 66'	Stadium: Brandon Park; Attendance: 2,344; Referee: John McConnell

26 January 1990 13	Sydney Croatia	1-1	Melita Eagles	Sydney
	Seal 56'	Report	Brown 90+4'	Stadium: Sydney Croatian Sports Centre; Attendance: 4,835; Referee: Gary Power

28 January 1990 14	Sydney Croatia	3-1	South Melbourne	Sydney
	Seal 12'; Hunter 49'; Lamond 61'	Report	Tsolakis 76'	Stadium: Sydney Croatian Sports Centre; Attendance: 3,486; Referee: Rob Davies

21 February 1990 15	St George-Budapest	1-2	Sydney Croatia	Sydney
	Krslovic 59'	Report	Arnold 62'; Seal 80'	Stadium: St George Stadium; Attendance: 1,121; Referee: Gary Power

9 February 1990 16	Sunshine George Cross	1-2	Sydney Croatia	Melbourne
	Faulkner 14'	Report	Ricoy 35'; Lamond 75'	Stadium: Skinner Reserve; Attendance: 1,500; Referee: John Santa Isabel

18 February 1990 17	Sydney Croatia	1-1	Adelaide City	Sydney
	Petkovic 2'	Report	A.Vidmar 17'	Stadium: Sydney Croatian Sports Centre; Attendance: 5,114; Referee: John Fraser

25 February 1990 18	APIA Leichhardt	1-1	Sydney Croatia	Sydney
	Murray 79'	Report	Hunter 51'	Stadium: Lambert Park; Attendance: 5,156; Referee: John Santa Isabel

4 March 1990 19	Sydney Croatia	1-1	Preston Makedonia	Sydney
	Arnold 31'	Report	Woodall 15'	Stadium: Sydney Croatian Sports Centre; Attendance: 4,986; Referee: John McConnell

11 March 1990 20	Sydney Olympic	3-2	Sydney Croatia	Sydney
	Perinovic 11'; Plataniotis 58'; Hristodoulou 61'	Report	Seal 71'; Jones 80'	Stadium: St George Stadium; Attendance: 5,343; Referee: John Santa Isabel

March 18 1990 21	Sydney Croatia	2-0	Blacktown City Demons	Sydney
	Jones 25'; Seal 71'	Report		Stadium: Sydney Croatian Sports Centre; Attendance: 2,870; Referee: Manny Loupis

25 March 1990 22	Marconi Fairfield	2-0	Sydney Croatia	Sydney
	McCulloch 12'; Okon 72'	Report		Stadium: Marconi Stadium; Attendance: 6,752; Referee: Chris Bambridge

1 April 1990 23	Sydney Croatia	3-3	Melbourne Croatia	Sydney
	Jurin 35'; Jones 43'; Seal 90+2'	Report	Marth 7'; Adzic 75', 84'	Stadium: Sydney Croatian Sports Centre; Attendance: 4,859; Referee: Jim Rossis

6 April 1990 24	West Adelaide Hellas	0-1	Sydney Croatia	Adelaide
		Report	Arnold 47'	Stadium: Hindmarsh Stadium; Attendance: 3,600; Referee: Jim McConnell

28 April 1990 25	Sydney Croatia	4-0	Wollongong City	Sydney
	Seal 25', 60', 77'; Ricoy 80'	Report		Stadium: Sydney Croatian Sports Centre; Attendance: 710; Referee: Dennis Voutsinas

22 April 1990 26	Sydney Croatia	1-3	Melita Eagles	Sydney
	Jones 42'	Report	Genc 49'; Farrugia 58'; Gimenez 73'	Stadium: Sydney Croatian Sports Centre; Attendance: 5,196; Referee: John Fraser

=== NSL Cup ===
14 February 1990 First round	St George-Budapest	0-3	Sydney Croatia	Sydney
		Report	Batten 6'; Ricoy 28'; Grbevski 43'	Stadium: St George Stadium; Attendance: 1,523; Referee: Richard Lorenc

14 March 1990 Second round	Sydney Olympic	3-1	Sydney Croatia	Sydney
	Plataniotis 3'; Phillips 10'; Lee 24'	Report	Kupresak 38'	Stadium: St George Stadium; Attendance: 2,475; Referee: John McConnell

=== Mid-Season Friendly ===
7 December 1989	Sydney Croatia	3-2	Mount Wellington AFC	Edensor Park, New South Wales
	Williams; Seal		Miranda; Barkley	Stadium: Sydney Croatian Sports Centre; Attendance: Behind Closed Doors

=== Post-Season Friendly ===
17 June 1990	Sydney Croatia	0-2	Hajduk Split	Edensor Park, New South Wales
			Lalić; Mise	Stadium: Sydney Croatian Sports Centre; Attendance: 10,000

== Statistics ==
=== Appearances and goals ===
Players with no appearances not included in the list.

No.	Pos.	Nat.	Name	National Soccer League		NSL Cup		Total	
No.	Pos.	Nat.	Name	Apps	Goals	Apps	Goals	Apps	Goals
—	FW	(Australia)	Graham Arnold	25	5	0	0	25	5
—	DF	(Australia)	Mark Babic	15	0	2	0	17	0
—	FW	(Australia)	David Batten	3	0	2	1	5	1
—	GK	(Australia)	Tony Franken	14	0	2	0	16	0
—	MF	(Australia)	Andrew French	5	0	0	0	5	0
—	DF	(Australia)	Mike Grbevski	25	2	2	1	27	3
—	MF	(Australia)	Steve Gojević	18	0	2	0	20	0
—	DF	(Australia)	Alan Hunter	22	2	2	0	24	2
—	DF	(Australia)	Mark Jones	26	4	1	0	27	4
—	DF	(Croatia)	Željko Jurin	8	1	1	0	9	1
—	GK	(Australia)	Zeljko Kalac	11	0	1	0	12	0
—	GK	(Australia)	John Krajnović	1	0	0	0	1	0
—	DF	(Croatia)	Velimir Kuprešak	18	0	2	1	20	1
—	FW	(Papua New Guinea)	Manis Lamond	23	3	2	0	25	3
—	MF	(Australia)	Eddie Pervan	1	0	0	0	1	0
—	MF	(Croatia)	Ivan Petković	12	1	1	0	13	1
—	MF	(Australia)	Tony Popovic	13	0	1	0	14	0
—	MF	(Australia)	Pedro Ricoy	22	3	2	1	24	4
—	DF	(Croatia)	Ante Rumora	18	0	2	0	20	0
—	MF	(Australia)	Wally Savor	17	0	1	0	18	0
—	FW	(Australia)	David Seal	26	15	2	0	28	15
—	MF	(Australia)	Ned Zelic	2	0	0	0	2	0
—	DF	(Australia)	Ante Žižić	1	0	0	0	1	0
