= 1988 National Soccer League grand final =

1988 National Soccer League Grand Final
- Event: 1988 National Soccer League
Sydney Croatia	Marconi Fairfield
2	2
- Marconi Fairfield won 5–4 on penalties
- Date: 3 September 1988
- Venue: Parramatta Stadium, Sydney
- Referee: Chris Beath
- Attendance: 17,064

The 1988 National Soccer League Grand Final was the fourth National Soccer League Grand Final, the championship-deciding match of the Australian National Soccer League and the culmination of the 1988 season. The match was played between Sydney Croatia and Marconi Fairfield on 3 September 1988 at Parramatta Stadium in Sydney.

This was the first NSL Grand Final for both teams. Marconi Fairfield won 5–4 on penalties after a 2–2 draw and is the first club to win the national league championship from fourth place. It was also the first Australian National League Grand Final to feature two teams from the same city, with both teams representing Sydney.

== Teams ==
Team	Previous grand final appearances
Sydney Croatia	None
Marconi Fairfield	None

== Route to the final ==
=== Sydney Croatia ===
Round	Sydney Croatia	
Regular season	2nd placed: Pos / Team / Pld / Pts; 1 / Wollongong City / 26 / 34; 2 / Sydney Croatia / 26 / 34; 3 / South Melbourne / 26 / 34; 4 / Marconi Fairfield (C) / 26 / 32; 5 / Sydney Olympic / 26 / 27; Source: rsssf.com (C) Champions	
Major semi-final	Opponent	Score
Major semi-final	Wollongong Wolves	0–0 (4–3 p) (A)

=== Marconi Fairfield ===
Round	Marconi Fairfield	
Regular season	4th placed: Pos / Team / Pld / Pts; 2 / Sydney Croatia / 26 / 34; 3 / South Melbourne / 26 / 34; 4 / Marconi Fairfield (C) / 26 / 32; 5 / Sydney Olympic / 26 / 27; 6 / Adelaide City / 26 / 27; Source: rsssf.com (C) Champions	
Elimination semi-final	Opponent	Score
Elimination semi-final	Sydney Olympic	3–1 (H)
Minor semi-final	Opponent	Score
Minor semi-final	South Melbourne	2–1 (A)
Preliminary Final	Opponent	Score
Preliminary Final	Wollongong City	2–0 (A)

== Match ==
=== Details ===
3 September 1988

Sydney Croatia	2–2 (a.e.t.)	Marconi Fairfield
Hunter 57'; Lamond 108'	Reports	Calderan 39'; Nastevski 117' (pen.)
Penalties
Arnold (penalty scored); Slater (penalty missed); Jennings (penalty scored); Jones (penalty scored); Hunter (penalty scored); Clinch (penalty missed)	4–5	(penalty scored) Gray; (penalty scored) Farina; (penalty missed) Wheatley; (penalty scored) Katholos; (penalty scored) Nastevski; (penalty scored) Henderson

Parramatta Stadium, Sydney
Attendance: 17,064
Referee: Chris Bambridge

GK	(Australia) Tony Franken
DF	(Australia) Wally Savor		(substituted off) 91'
DF	(Australia) Graham Jennings
DF	(Australia) Alan Hunter
DF	(Socialist Federal Republic of Yugoslavia) Vedran Rožić
DF	(Australia) Mark Jones
MF	(Australia) Shane Clinch
MF	(Australia) Robbie Slater
MF	(Socialist Federal Republic of Yugoslavia) Ivan Petkovic	(red card) 63'
FW	(Australia) Graham Arnold
FW	(Papua New Guinea) Manis Lamond		(substituted off) 115'
Substitutes:
MF	(Australia) Craig Foster		(substituted on) 91'
FW	(Australia) Sean Ingham		(substituted on) 115'
Head coach:
(Socialist Federal Republic of Yugoslavia) Vedran Rožić

GK	(England) Bob Catlin
DF	(Australia) Paul Carter
DF	(Australia) Tony Henderson
DF	(Socialist Federal Republic of Yugoslavia) Steve Calderan
DF	(Costa Rica) Gerry Gomez	(red card) 65'
MF	(Australia) Matteo Colucci		(substituted off) 15'
MF	(Australia) Ian Gray
MF	(Socialist Federal Republic of Yugoslavia) Zlatko Nastevski
MF	(Australia) Peter Katholos
MF	(Australia) David Lowe		(substituted off) 65'
FW	(Australia) Frank Farina
Substitutes:
DF	(Australia) Robert Wheatley		(substituted on) 15'
FW	(New Zealand) Fred de Jong		(substituted on) 115'
Head coach:
(Australia) Berti Mariani

Assistant referees:
Fourth official:

Match rules

- 90 minutes.
- 30 minutes of extra time if necessary.
- Penalty shoot-out if scores still level.

== See also ==
- 1988 National Soccer League
