= National Soccer League Under 21 Player of the Year =

- Awarded for: The best young player in each given NSL season
- Country: Australia
- First award: 1977
- Final award: 2004

Highlights
- Most awards: Paul Trimboli, Paul Okon, Mark Viduka and Alex Brosque (2)

The National Soccer League Under 21 Player of the Year was an annual soccer award present to the most outstanding player in Australia's National Soccer League under the age of 21. The award was established in the NSL's first season in 1977 and it ran until its last in 2003–04.

The inaugural winner was John Kosmina of West Adelaide, who finished fourth that season. The last winner of the award was Alex Brosque, who played for fourth-placed Marconi that season. Paul Trimboli, Paul Okon, Mark Viduka and Alex Brosque are the only players to win the award twice.

== Winners ==
Season	Manager	Nationality	Club	Ref
1977	John Kosmina	Australia	West Adelaide	
1978	Ian Souness	Australia	Sydney City	
1979	Eddie Krncevic	Australia	Marconi	
1980	John Spanos	Australia	Sydney City	
1981	Dave Mitchell	Australia	Adelaide City	
1982	David Lowe	Australia	Newcastle KB United	
1983	Oscar Crino	Australia	South Melbourne	
1984	Tony Franken	Australia	Canberra City	
1985	Alan Hunter	Australia	Brisbane Lions	
1986	Ernie Tapai	Australia	Melbourne City	
1987	John Markovski	Australia	Sunshine George Cross	
1988	Paul Trimboli	Australia	South Melbourne	
1989	Paul Trimboli (2)	Australia	South Melbourne	
1989–90	Paul Okon	Australia	Marconi	
1990–91	Paul Okon (2)	Australia	Marconi	
1991–92	Kevin Muscat	Australia	Heidelberg United	
1992–93	Steve Corica	Australia	Marconi	
1993–94	Mark Viduka	Australia	Melbourne Knights	
1994–95	Mark Viduka (2)	Australia	Melbourne Knights	
1995–96	Jim Tsekenis	Australia	West Adelaide	
1996–97	Kasey Wehrman	Australia	Brisbane Strikers	
1997–98	Brett Emerton	Australia	UTS Sydney Olympic	
1998–99	Mile Sterjovski	Australia	Sydney United	
1999–2000	Ivan Ergić	Serbia	Perth Glory	
2000–01	Ben Burgess	Republic of Ireland	Northern Spirit	
2001–02	Joseph Schirripa	Australia	Newcastle United	
2002–03	Alex Brosque	Australia	Marconi	
2003–04	Alex Brosque (2)	Australia	Marconi	

== Multiple winners ==
Awards	Player	Team	Seasons
2	(Australia) Paul Trimboli	South Melbourne	1988, 1989
2	(Australia) Paul Okon	Marconi	1989–90, 1990–91
2	(Australia) Mark Viduka	Melbourne Knights	1993–94, 1994–95
2	(Australia) Alex Brosque	Marconi	2002–03, 2003–04

== Awards won by club ==
Club	Wins
Marconi	6
South Melbourne	3
Melbourne Knights	2
Sydney City	2
West Adelaide	2
Adelaide City	1
Brisbane Lions	1
Brisbane Strikers	1
Canberra City	1
Heidelberg United	1
Melbourne City	1
Newcastle KB United	1
Newcastle United	1
Northern Spirit	1
Perth Glory	1
Sunshine George Cross	1
Sydney United	1
UTS Sydney Olympic	1
