= 1987 National Soccer League =

Australian soccer season

National Soccer League
- Season: 1987
- Dates: 27 March – 1 November 1987
- Champions: APIA Leichhardt; 1st title
- Relegated: Heidelberg United
- Matches: 162
- Goals: 391 (2.41 per match)
- Top goalscorer: Frank Farina (18 goals)
- Biggest home win: Sydney Croatia 6–1 Melbourne Croatia (29 March 1987)
- Biggest away win: Sydney Croatia 0–5 Marconi Fairfield (11 October 1987)
- Highest scoring: Heidelberg United 6–2 Sunshine George Cross (10 May 1987)
- Highest attendance: 9,000; Heidelberg United 1–1 South Melbourne (24 May 1987)
- Lowest attendance: 400; Brunswick Juventus 0–1 Adelaide City (27 September 1987)
- Total attendance: 500,763
- Average attendance: 3,091

The 1987 National Soccer League season was the 11th season of the National Soccer League, the former top Australian professional league for association football clubs since its establishment in 1977. The season saw the format returned to a single league of fourteen teams instead of the two-conference system. Sydney City SC withdrew from the competition after round 1, reducing the competition to 13 teams. The finals series for the Championship was also removed and replaced with the standard non-Championship defining play-offs with the actual Championship determined by a first past the post, won by APIA Leichhardt.

== Teams ==
Note: Table lists in alphabetical order.

Team	Location	Stadium(s)	Capacity
Adelaide City	Adelaide	Hindmarsh Stadium; Olympic Sports Field	16,500; 8,000
APIA Leichhardt	Sydney (Leichhardt)	Lambert Park; Belmore Oval	7,000; 19,000
Brunswick Juventus	Melbourne (Brunswick East)	Olympic Village; Olympic Park	12,000; 18,500
Footscray JUST	Melbourne (Footscray)	Schintler Reserve	?
Heidelberg United	Melbourne (Heidelberg West)	Olympic Village; Deakin Reserve	12,000; 10,000
Marconi Fairfield	Sydney (Fairfield)	Marconi Stadium	9,000
Melbourne Croatia	Melbourne (Sunshine North)	Olympic Park	12,000
Preston Makedonia	Melbourne (Preston)	B.T. Connor Reserve	8,000
South Melbourne	Melbourne (Albert Park)	Middle Park; Olympic Park	18,000; 12,000
St George-Budapest	Sydney (Banksia)	St George Stadium	12,000
Sunshine George Cross	Melbourne (Sunshine)	Chaplin Reserve	5,000
Sydney Croatia	Sydney (Edensor Park)	Croatian Sports Centre	12,000
Sydney Olympic	Sydney (Belmore)	St George Stadium; King Tomislav Park	12,000

== Regular season ==
=== League table ===
Pos	Team	Pld	W	D	L	GF	GA	GD	Pts	Qualification or relegation
1	APIA Leichhardt (C)	24	13	9	2	39	21	+18	35	Qualification for the Finals series (Note: The Finals series was not considered the championship for the 1987 National Soccer League.)
2	Preston Makedonia	24	11	7	6	32	22	+10	29	Qualification for the Finals series
3	St George-Budapest	24	12	5	7	31	24	+7	29	Qualification for the Finals series
4	Marconi Fairfield	24	11	5	8	41	25	+16	27	Qualification for the Finals series
5	Sydney Croatia	24	10	6	8	31	25	+6	26	Qualification for the Finals series
6	South Melbourne	24	9	7	8	32	34	−2	25	
7	Sydney Olympic	24	7	9	8	29	32	−3	23	
8	Brunswick Juventus	24	9	5	10	18	23	−5	23	
9	Melbourne Croatia	24	9	5	10	22	30	−8	23	
10	Adelaide City	24	6	10	8	29	23	+6	22	
11	Footscray JUST	24	7	8	9	17	27	−10	22	
12	Sunshine George Cross	24	3	9	12	26	42	−16	15	
13	Heidelberg United (R)	24	3	7	14	25	44	−19	13	Relegation to the Victorian State League
14	Sydney City	0	0	0	0	0	0	0	0	Withdrew

Updated to match(es) played on unknown. Source: rsssf.com
Rules for classification: 1) points; 2) goal difference; 3) number of goals scored.
(C) Champions; (R) Relegated

=== Results ===
Home \ Away	ADE	API	BRU	FOO	HEI	MAR	MEL	PRE	SOU	STG	SGC	SCR	SOL
Adelaide City	—	0–1	4–0	0–0	4–1	1–2	3–0	0–0	0–1	0–1	1–1	0–0	2–2
APIA Leichhardt	2–2	—	1–0	3–1	1–1	1–1	3–0	2–0	4–0	0–0	3–1	1–2	2–1
Brunswick Juventus	0–1	1–1	—	0–0	3–1	2–1	0–1	1–1	3–1	1–0	1–0	0–0	1–0
Footscray JUST	2–2	0–0	0–1	—	1–0	0–2	0–0	0–0	1–2	0–2	1–1	0–0	1–0
Heidelberg United	1–1	2–2	0–1	0–3	—	1–5	1–3	0–1	1–1	1–2	6–2	0–2	3–1
Marconi Fairfield	1–1	0–2	2–0	4–0	1–0	—	0–1	0–1	0–2	2–0	3–3	0–1	1–1
Melbourne Croatia	0–3	0–1	2–0	0–1	1–0	1–0	—	0–2	0–2	1–1	1–1	3–1	1–1
Preston Makedonia	2–1	4–0	0–0	3–0	1–2	2–3	1–0	—	2–1	2–0	0–2	1–2	1–1
South Melbourne	1–0	1–1	1–0	1–2	1–1	0–2	2–1	2–2	—	2–1	3–0	1–1	2–2
St George-Budapest	1–0	1–3	4–1	1–0	1–1	1–2	0–2	3–0	3–2	—	2–1	2–1	2–0
Sunshine George Cross	0–0	2–3	0–2	1–2	1–1	2–2	0–2	0–1	3–0	2–2	—	0–0	2–1
Sydney Croatia	2–3	0–1	1–0	0–2	2–0	0–5	6–1	1–1	2–0	0–1	3–1	—	0–1
Sydney Olympic	1–0	1–1	1–0	3–0	3–1	2–1	1–1	1–4	2–2	0–0	2–0	1–4	—

Source: OzFootball.net
Legend: Blue = home team win; Yellow = draw; Red = away team win.

== Finals series ==
A top five Finals series was played at the end of the regular season. The Finals series was not considered the Championship for this season.

=== Preliminary semi-final ===
18 October 1987	Preston Makedonia	1–2	St George-Budapest	Sydney
	Slifkas 66'	Report	Ollerenshaw 42', 81'	Stadium: St George Stadium; Attendance: 3,964; Referee: Jim Reeves

=== Elimination semi-final ===
21 October 1987	Marconi Fairfield	3–2 (a.e.t.)	Sydney Croatia	Sydney
	Farina 81'; Nastevski 85'; McCulloch 98'	Report	Clinch 10'; Arnold 87'	Stadium: St George Stadium; Attendance: 4,500; Referee: Chris Bambridge

=== Minor semi-final ===
25 October 1987	Preston Makedonia	2–2 (a.e.t.) (5–3 p)	Marconi Fairfield	Melbourne
	Smith 30'; Dimovski 56'	Report	Farina (?); Gomez 39'	Stadium: Olympic Park; Attendance: 2,700; Referee: Rob Davies

=== Major semi-final ===
25 October 1987	APIA Leichhardt	1–2	St George	Sydney
	Phillips 77'	Report	Moffitt 16'; Fletcher 85'	Stadium: St George Stadium; Attendance: 3,400; Referee: Dennis Voutsianis

=== Preliminary Final ===
28 October 1987	APIA Leichhardt	0–0 (a.e.t.) (3–1 p)	Preston Makedonia	Melbourne
		Report		Stadium: Olympic Park; Attendance: 2,700; Referee: Don Campbell

=== Grand Final ===
1 November 1987

St George-Budapest	4–0	APIA Leichhardt
Hagan 20', 72'; Ollerenshaw 32'; Ricoy 44'	Report

Parramatta Stadium, Sydney
Attendance: 6,961
Referee: Richard Lorenc

== Season statistics ==
=== Top scorers ===
Rank	Player	Club	Goals
1	(Australia) Frank Farina	Marconi Fairfield	16
2	(Australia) Rod Brown	APIA Leichhardt	14
3	(England) Paul Lewis	Melbourne Croatia	10
3	(Australia) Steve Smith	Preston Makedonia	10
5	(Australia) Joe Mullen	Adelaide City	9
5	(Australia) Robbie Slater	Sydney Croatia	9
5	(Australia) Charlie Villani	Adelaide City	9
8	(Scotland) Ron Campbell	Preston Makedonia	8
8	(Australia) John Markovski	Sunshine George Cross	8
8	(Australia) Paul Wade	South Melbourne	8

==== Hat-tricks ====
Player	For	Against	Result	Date
(Australia) Robbie Slater	Sydney Croatia	Melbourne Croatia	6–1 (H)	29 March 1987
(Scotland) Frank McGrellis	Brunswick Juventus	Heidelberg United	3–1 (H)	5 July 1987
(Australia) Paul Trimboli	Sunshine George Cross	South Melbourne	3–0 (H)	19 July 1987
(Australia) Frank Farina	Marconi Fairfield	Heidelberg United	5–1 (A)	9 August 1987
(Socialist Federal Republic of Yugoslavia) Goce Dimovski	Preston Makedonia	APIA Leichhardt	4–0 (H)	13 September 1987
(Australia) Frank Farina	Marconi Fairfield	Sydney Croatia	5–0 (A)	11 October 1987

== Awards ==
Award	Winner	Club
Referee's Player of the Year	(Australia) Andrew Zinni	Brunswick Juventus
Player's Player of the Year	(Australia) Frank Farina	Marconi Fairfield
U-21 Player of the Year	(Australia) John Markovski	Sunshine George Cross
Coach of the Year	(Socialist Federal Republic of Yugoslavia) Rale Rasic	APIA Leichhardt
