= Brockbank =

Brockbank is a surname. Notable people with the surname include:

- Andy Brockbank (born 1961), retired English footballer
- Bernard P. Brockbank (1909–2000), LDS church official
- Chris Brockbank, English rugby league footballer and coach
- Harry Brockbank (born 1998), English footballer
- John Brockbank (1848–1896)
- Russell Brockbank (1913–1979), Canadian-born UK cartoonist

== See also ==
- Brockbank Jr high, a school in Utah, United States
