= 1989 National Soccer League =

Australian soccer season

NSL 1989
- League: National Soccer League
- Sport: Association football
- Duration: 1989
- Teams: 14

NSL season
- Champions: Marconi Fairfield
- Top scorer: Zlatko Nastevski (20)

National Soccer League seasons
- ← 1988 1989-90 →

The 1989 National Soccer League season, was the 13th season of the National Soccer League (NSL) in Australia.

== Background ==
The Australian Soccer Federation began the year by announcing that the NSL would be televised on ABC rather than on SBS who had shown the league since 1979. SBS challenged the decision in the New South Wales Supreme Court and were allowed to show matches in rounds 1 and 2 before the court found in favour of the ABC.

== League table ==
Pos	Team	Pld	W	D	L	GF	GA	GD	Pts	Qualification or relegation
1	Marconi Fairfield (C)	26	16	6	4	62	24	+38	38	Qualification for the Finals series
2	St George-Budapest	26	12	8	6	33	24	+9	32	Qualification for the Finals series
3	Sydney Olympic	26	11	9	6	37	26	+11	31	Qualification for the Finals series
4	Melbourne Croatia	26	13	5	8	44	35	+9	31	Qualification for the Finals series
5	Preston Makedonia	26	11	8	7	31	24	+7	30	Qualification for the Finals series
6	Adelaide City	26	10	8	8	29	24	+5	28	
7	Sydney Croatia	26	10	8	8	25	25	0	28	
8	South Melbourne	26	9	8	9	44	37	+7	26	
9	Wollongong City	26	8	7	11	22	29	−7	23	
10	APIA Leichhardt	26	7	9	10	27	35	−8	23	
11	Sunshine George Cross	26	7	5	14	25	38	−13	19	
12	Blacktown City	26	5	9	12	28	50	−22	19	
13	Melbourne JUST (R)	26	5	8	13	24	37	−13	18	Relegation to the Victorian State League
14	Heidelberg United (R)	26	7	4	15	22	45	−23	18	Relegation to the Victorian State League

Updated to match(es) played on unknown. Source: rsssf.com
Rules for classification: 1) points; 2) goal difference; 3) number of goals scored.
(C) Champions; (R) Relegated

== Finals series ==
Elimination and qualifying Finals
2	St George-Budapest	1
3	Sydney Olympic	0
4	Melbourne Croatia	2
5	Preston Makedonia	0

Semi-finals
1	Marconi Fairfield	1
2	St George-Budapest	0
3	Sydney Olympic	3
4	Melbourne Croatia	2

Preliminary Final
2	St George-Budapest	0
3	Sydney Olympic	1

Grand Final
1	Marconi Fairfield	1
2	Sydney Olympic	0

== Individual awards ==
- Player of the Year: Zlatko Nastevski (Marconi Fairfield)
- U-21 Player of the Year: Paul Trimboli (South Melbourne)
- Top Scorer: Zlatko Nastevski (Marconi Fairfield) – 20 goals
- Coach of the Year: Bertie Mariani (Marconi Fairfield)
