= Mike Grbevski =

Australian soccer player

Michael Grbevski
Personal information
- Full name: Michael Grbevski
- Date of birth: 9 April 1967 (age 59)
- Place of birth: Sydney, Australia
- Position: Defender

Senior career*
| Years | Team | Apps | (Gls) |
| 1987-1989 | St George FC | 70 | (3) |
| 1989-1992 | Sydney United | 64 | (3) |
| 1992 | Rockdale Ilinden | 15 | (1) |
| 1992-1993 | Adelaide City | 10 | (1) |
| 1993 | St George FC | 21 | (3) |
| 1993-1994 | Wollongong Wolves | 9 | (1) |
| 1996-1997 | St George FC | | |
| 1998-1999 | Arncliffe Scots | | (23) |

International career^{‡}
| 1992 | Australia | 3 | (0) |

Managerial career
- 2008: Rockdale Ilinden
- 2021: Cringila Lions
- * Club domestic league appearances and goals as of 8 December 2025 ‡ National team caps and goals as of 8 December 2025

Michael "Mike" Grbevski (born 9 April 1967) is an Australian former professional soccer player and coach. A defender, he played in the National Soccer League (NSL) during the late 1980s and 1990s and represented the Australian national team in 1992. Following his playing career, Grbevski transitioned into coaching roles across New South Wales football.

== Career statistics ==
=== Club ===
| Club | Years | League appearances | Goals |
|---|---|---|---|
| St George FC | 1987–1989 | 70 | 3 |
| Sydney United | 1989–1992 | 64 | 3 |
| Rockdale Ilinden | 1992 | 15 | 1 |
| Adelaide City | 1992–1993 | 10 | 1 |
| St George FC | 1993 | 21 | 3 |
| Wollongong Wolves | 1993–1994 | 9 | 1 |
| Arncliffe Scots | 1998–1999 | 23 | 23* |

- Includes non-NSL competition goals.

== Playing career ==
=== Club career ===
Grbevski began his senior career with St George FC in 1987, making more than 70 league appearances as a defender. In 1989, he joined Sydney United (then known as Sydney Croatia), where he became a regular first-team player and made 64 league appearances over three seasons.

In 1992, Grbevski spent a brief period with Rockdale Ilinden before returning to NSL competition with Adelaide City. He later had a stint with the Wollongong Wolves and also returned to St George FC during the mid-1990s.

He concluded his playing career with Arncliffe Scots in the New South Wales Federation Division Two, where he recorded a notably high goal tally for a defender.

Throughout his career, Grbevski was recognised for his defensive reliability, positional discipline, and leadership at the back.

=== International career ===
During 1992, Grbevski appeared three times for Australia in full internationals.

=== Management Career ===
He has coached Rockdale Ilinden in the NSW Premier League and Cringila Lions in the Illawarra Premier League.
