= Mark Jones (footballer, born 1966) =

Australian soccer player and manager

Personal information
- Full name: Mark Sean Jones
- Date of birth: 5 June 1966 (age 60)
- Place of birth: Newcastle, New South Wales, Australia
- Position: Defender

Team information
- Current team: Floreat Athena (technical director)

Youth career
- Toronto-Awaba
- Newcastle Austral

Senior career*
Years	Team	Apps	(Gls)
1985–1986	Newcastle Rosebud	36	(10)
1987–1990	Sydney Croatia	98	(14)
1990–1992	Marconi Fairfield	49	(2)
1993–1994	Newcastle Breakers	24	(0)
Total		207	(26)

International career^{‡}
1985	Australia U20		

Managerial career
- 2013: Central Coast Mariners Academy
- 2016: Adelaide United Youth
- 2016: Adelaide United Women
- 2016–2017: Newcastle Jets
- * Club domestic league appearances and goals as of 23 September 2016 ‡ National team caps and goals as of 23 September 2016

Mark Sean Jones (born 5 June 1966) is an Australian professional football manager and former player who is the technical director of National Premier Leagues Western Australia Men's club Floreat Athena.

He has served as manager of A-League club Newcastle Jets.

== Club career ==
Jones began his career with Newcastle Rosebud in 1985 before joining Sydney Croatia in 1987, where he enjoyed the most success including winning the NSL Cup in 1987 and made the 1988 National Soccer League grand final.

He joined Marconi Fairfield in 1990 and spent two seasons at Bossley Park before finishing his career in his hometown with Newcastle Breakers in the 1993–94 season.

Playing as a midfielder and as a defender, Jones concluded his career with over 200 NSL games to his name.

== International career ==
He represented the Australia national under-20 team at the 1985 FIFA World Youth Championship in the Soviet Union, where he played all three games.

== Managerial career ==
Jones possesses an FFA A Licence, an AFC Pro Licence, is a certified Asian Football Confederation elite conditioning instructor and is one of only 12 accredited FIFA fitness instructors. Jones' status as one of only twelve FIFA fitness instructors has allowed him to be an instructor at a number of FIFA football fitness courses in Bahrain, North Korea, Singapore, and the United Arab Emirates.

Jones began his managerial career at the New South Wales Institute of Sport in 2000 where he was head coach of the women's program before taking up an assistant coach role at Newcastle Jets in 2006.

Following the takeover by Nathan Tinkler in late 2010, Jones left his post as the assistant coach to Branko Culina, in a mutual termination. Jones had made a recognizable contribution to the club, aiding Newcastle in their first A-League championship.

Jones worked as an assistant coach for 5 months with Chongqing Lifan, before departing in May 2012. He was subsequently appointed as an assistant coach with Perth Glory, where he was charged with overseeing technique, conditioning and video analysis.

After departing from his role with Perth in December 2012, In 2013, Jones was appointed as manager of the Central Coast Mariners Academy.

In early 2015, following major staff and player changes at Newcastle Jets, Jones was appointed assistant to Phil Stubbins with the first team. Jones also took on the role of strength and conditioning coach at the club.

In January 2016, Jones joined Adelaide United to coach their youth team. 8 months later he was appointed to coach Adelaide United's women's team.

However, in September 2016, Jones was named as head coach of Newcastle Jets with Clayton Zane as his assistant.

On 16 April 2017, Jones was sacked as manager of Newcastle, after the team finished last in the A-League.

Jones was appointed technical director of Football West State League team Murdoch University Melville in February 2018. In 2021, Jones helped Murdoch University Melville to promotion to Division 1.

Jones has also served as a lecturer at Edith Cowan University and as a strength and conditioning educator at FIFA and the AFC.

== Managerial statistics ==
As of 16 April 2017

Team	Nat	From	To	Record				
Team	Nat	From	To	G	W	D	L	Win %
Newcastle Jets	(Australia)	23 September 2016	16 April 2017	27	5	7	15	18.52
Total				27	5	7	15	18.52

== Honours ==
With Sydney Croatia:

- (Australia) NSL Cup: 1987
