= Andy Brockbank =

English footballer

Personal information
- Full name: Andrew Brockbank
- Date of birth: 23 September 1961 (age 65)
- Place of birth: Millom, Cumbria, England
- Height: 5 ft 10 in (1.78 m)
- Position: Defender

Senior career*
Years	Team	Apps	(Gls)
1979–1983	Blackpool	36	(1)
1984	Canberra City	22	(1)
1985-86	Runcorn		
1986-1988	Barrow		
1988	Sydney United	1	(0)
1989-1992	Bonnyrigg White Eagles	24	(0)
1993–1994	Blacktown City	39	(2)
- * Club domestic league appearances and goals

Andrew Brockbank (born 23 September 1961) is an English retired footballer. He played at left back. He lives in Penrith, Australia, where he fits air-conditioning systems.

In 1984, Andy went to Australia and played with Canberra City in the National Soccer League. He returned to England after one season in Australia, and played with Runcorn and Barrow, before returning to the Australian National Soccer League in 1988, briefly playing for Sydney United, then known as Sydney Croatia. He only made one appearance, which was in the Semi-Final win over Wollongong Wolves.

He joined Bonnyrigg White Eagles in 1989, then known as Avala, in the NSW Super League, and would go onto to win the Premiership and Championship with them in 1992.

In 1993, he joined Blacktown City, where he won the NSW Super League Premiership.
