= Zlatko Nastevski =

Australian footballer

Personal information
- Full name: Zlatko Nastevski
- Date of birth: 4 March 1957 (age 69)
- Place of birth: Skopje, FPR Yugoslavia
- Height: 1.80 m (5 ft 11 in)
- Position: Attacking midfielder

Senior career*
| Years | Team | Apps | (Gls) |
| 1976–1981 | Vardar | 20 | (0) |
| 1980–1981 | Rabotnički | 13 | (3) |
| 1982–1986 | Pelister | 78 | (42) |
| 1987–1991 | Marconi Stallions | 90 | (52) |
| 1990–1991 | → Wollongong Macedonia (loan) | 12 | (0) |
| 1991–1992 | Sydney Olympic | 8 | (0) |
| 1992 | → Wollongong Macedonia (loan) | 19 | (0) |
| 1993–1994 | Kedah | | |
| 1995–1997 | Marconi Stallions | | |

Managerial career
- 2004–2005: Marconi Stallions
- 2006–2007: Rockdale City Suns
- * Club domestic league appearances and goals as of 2 December 2007

Zlatko Nastevski (Macedonian: Златкo Hacтeвcки; born 4 August 1957) is a retired Macedonian footballer who played as an attacking midfielder.

In October 2009, he played in the Australian "Olderoos" squad in the World Masters Games. Nastevski currently devotes his time to training Australia's future football talent through his academy NDFD.

== Honours ==
Marconi Fairfield

- NSL Championship: 1988, 1989

Individual

- NSL Player of the Year: 1989 with Marconi Fairfield
- NSL Top Scorer: 1989 with Marconi Fairfield (20 goals)
