= Chaplin Reserve =

Soccer stadium in Australia

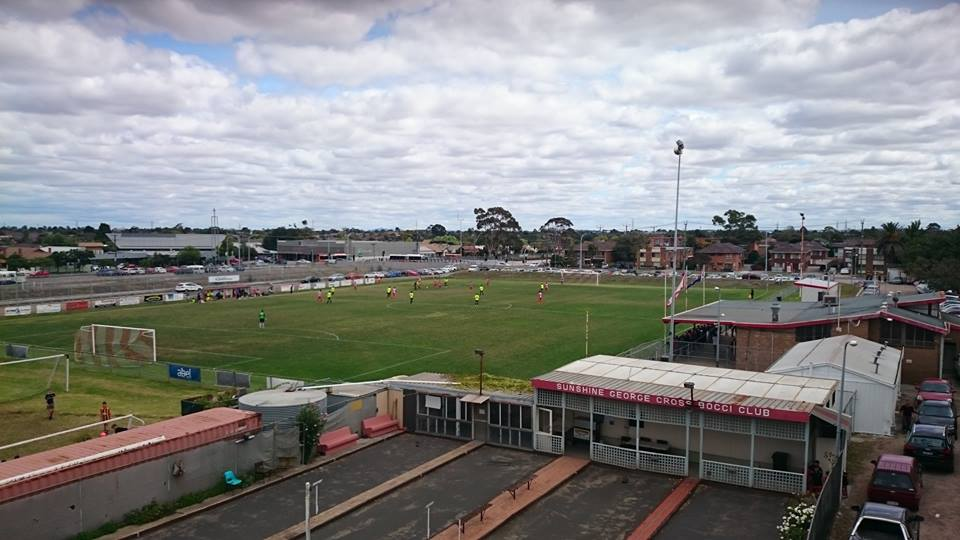
- Chaplin Reserve in 2015
- Interactive map of Chaplin Reserve
- Location: Sunshine, Victoria
- Coordinates: 37°47′6″S 144°49′43″E
- Owner: City of Brimbank
- Capacity: 5,000
- Surface: Grass

Construction
- Opened: 1980
- Demolished: 2019

Tenant
- Sunshine George Cross

Chaplin Reserve was an Australian soccer stadium in Sunshine, a suburb of Melbourne, Victoria. It was the home of Sunshine George Cross from 1980 to 2017, buying the facility from the State Government in 1997. The stadium had a capacity of 5,000. Chaplin Reserve was also home to the Sunshine George Cross Bocci Club. The state government sold the land to the soccer club on the condition that it was only used for the purpose of a private sports ground.

Despite the reserve being sold to George Cross on the condition that it was only used for the purpose of a private sports ground, George Cross sold the reserve to developers in 2016, who intend to build 150 townhouses on the site, despite angry objections by Sunshine residents. After using Knights Stadium in 2018, the soccer club moved to City Vista Recreation Reserve in Fraser Rise in 2019.
