= Ante Rumora =

Croatian footballer

Personal information
- Full name: Ante Rumora
- Date of birth: 4 July 1960 (age 66)
- Place of birth: SR Croatia, SFR Yugoslavia
- Position: Defender

Senior career*
Years	Team	Apps	(Gls)
1979–1981	Zagreb	42	(0)
1982–1985	Dinamo	37	(0)
1984	→ Dinamo Vinkovci (loan)	13	(0)
1986–1993	Sydney Croatia	99	(3)

Managerial career
- 2007: Sydney United
- * Club domestic league appearances and goals

Ante Rumora (born 4 July 1960 in SFR Yugoslavia) is a Croatian former football defender who played for Dinamo Zagreb.
