= Manis Lamond =

Papua New Guinean footballer (born 1966)

Personal information
- Date of birth: 14 September 1966 (age 60)
- Place of birth: Papua New Guinea
- Position: Striker

Senior career*
Years	Team	Apps	(Gls)
1984–1986	Canberra City	25	(5)
1988–1994	Sydney United	181	(30)
1994	A.P.I.A. Leichhardt Tigers	5	(0)
1994–1996	Sydney United	48	(15)
1996	Sembawang Rangers	-	(-)
1996–1997	Wollongong City	3	(0)
1997–1998	Marconi Stallions	6	(0)
2000–2001	Newcastle United	0	(0)

International career
1984	Australia Schoolboy		
1996	Papua New Guinea	2	(0)
- * Club domestic league appearances and goals

Manis Lamond (born 14 September 1966) is a retired soccer player from Papua New Guinea. An international who played as a striker, Lamond played professionally in Australia for Canberra City, Sydney United, A.P.I.A. Leichhardt Tigers, Wollongong City, Marconi Stallions and Newcastle United and in Singapore for Sembawang Rangers.
