= Ian Gray (soccer) =

Australian soccer player (1963–2010)

Personal information
- Full name: Ian Gray
- Date of birth: 22 July 1963
- Place of birth: Sydney, Australia
- Date of death: 15 February 2010 (aged 46)
- Position: Midfielder

Senior career*
Years	Team	Apps	(Gls)
1980–1985	A.P.I.A. Leichhardt	85	(9)
1985–1995	Marconi	244	(38)

International career
1985	Australia B	2	(0)
1984–1992	Australia	14	(3)
- * Club domestic league appearances and goals

Ian "Iggy" Gray (22 July 1963 – 15 February 2010) was a former Australian soccer player who played in the National Soccer League (NSL) between 1980 and 1995 for A.P.I.A. Leichhardt and Marconi. Gray represented the Australia national soccer team 14 times between 1984 and 1992.

== Early life ==
Ian Gray was the son of Avenel and Georgina Gray. He was born on 22 July 1963 and raised in Manly Vale, a suburb of northern Sydney, in the Northern Beaches region.

== Career ==
=== Club career ===
He began playing Football at Manly Vale Soccer Club and Western Suburbs SC (NSW), then later for A.P.I.A. Leichhardt (playing five seasons and 85 games) and Marconi (playing seven seasons, over 150 games and winning three titles, the last in 1993 as captain) in the National Soccer League.

=== International career ===
In 1981, he began a 12-year national representative career, and in 1984 was involved in Australia's 1986 FIFA World Cup qualifying campaign. Later in the year he joined the Australian National Team on a long world tour, playing in China, England, Scotland and Italy.

He was capped 14 times (A-Internationals) for the Australian National Team, scoring once. playing another 21 non-A Internationals over nine years and between 1984 and 1992 scored 6 goals (three A International goals) for the national team In 2004, he was inducted into the Australian Football (Soccer) Hall of Fame, (Award of Distinction) and was also a member of the Football Federation Australia Appeals committee.

=== FFA career statistics ===
Socceroo honours:
35 appearances (6 goals) [1984-1992]
14 A internationals (3 goals) / 21 non–A internationals (3 goals)

Other Australian representative honours:
U-20 – 1981 U-20 World Cup train-on squad

Club career:
1980 – APIA Leichhardt (Australia) 1 appearance (0 goals)
1981 – APIA Leichhardt (Australia) 14a (0g)
1982 – APIA Leichhardt (Australia) 16a (1g)
1983 – APIA Leichhardt (Australia) 25a (2g)
1984 – APIA Leichhardt (Australia) 29a (6g)
1985 – Marconi Stallions (Australia) 23a (4g)
1986 – Marconi Stallions (Australia) 24a (3g)
1987 – Marconi Stallions (Australia) 16a (0g)
1988 – Marconi Stallions (Australia) 26a (6g)
1989 – Marconi Stallions (Australia) 26a (8g)
89/90 – Marconi Stallions (Australia) 23a (5g)
90/91 – Marconi Stallions (Australia) 22a (3g)
91/92 – Marconi Stallions (Australia) 21a (1g)
92/93 – Marconi Stallions (Australia) 22a (2g)
93/94 – Marconi Stallions (Australia) 26a (5g)
94/95 – Marconi Stallions (Australia) 15a (1g)

TOTAL NSL APPEARANCES (GOALS): 329 appearances (47 goals)

== Coaching career ==
Ian Gray mentored Steve Corica and Mark Schwarzer during their early years. After retiring from professional football in 1995 Gray continued to play at an amateur level for the Maccabi Masters and Team Bondi but also turned his attention to helping junior players. Most recently he was coaching at Maccabi Hakoah Football Club with the Under 15 State Youth League.

== Death ==
On 15 February 2010 Gray was found by friends slumped on a lounge in his Elizabeth Bay, East Sydney unit after he failed to arrive for a coaching session, and then failed to answer his telephone. A 22-year-old woman was subsequently charged with manslaughter, though the charges were later dropped.

In September 2015, with the permission of Avenel Gray, Manly Vale Football Club named their perpetual Senior Player of the Year trophy as the "Ian Gray Senior Men's Player of the Year".
