= Sydney United Sports Centre =

Multi-use stadium in Edensor Park, Sydney, Australia

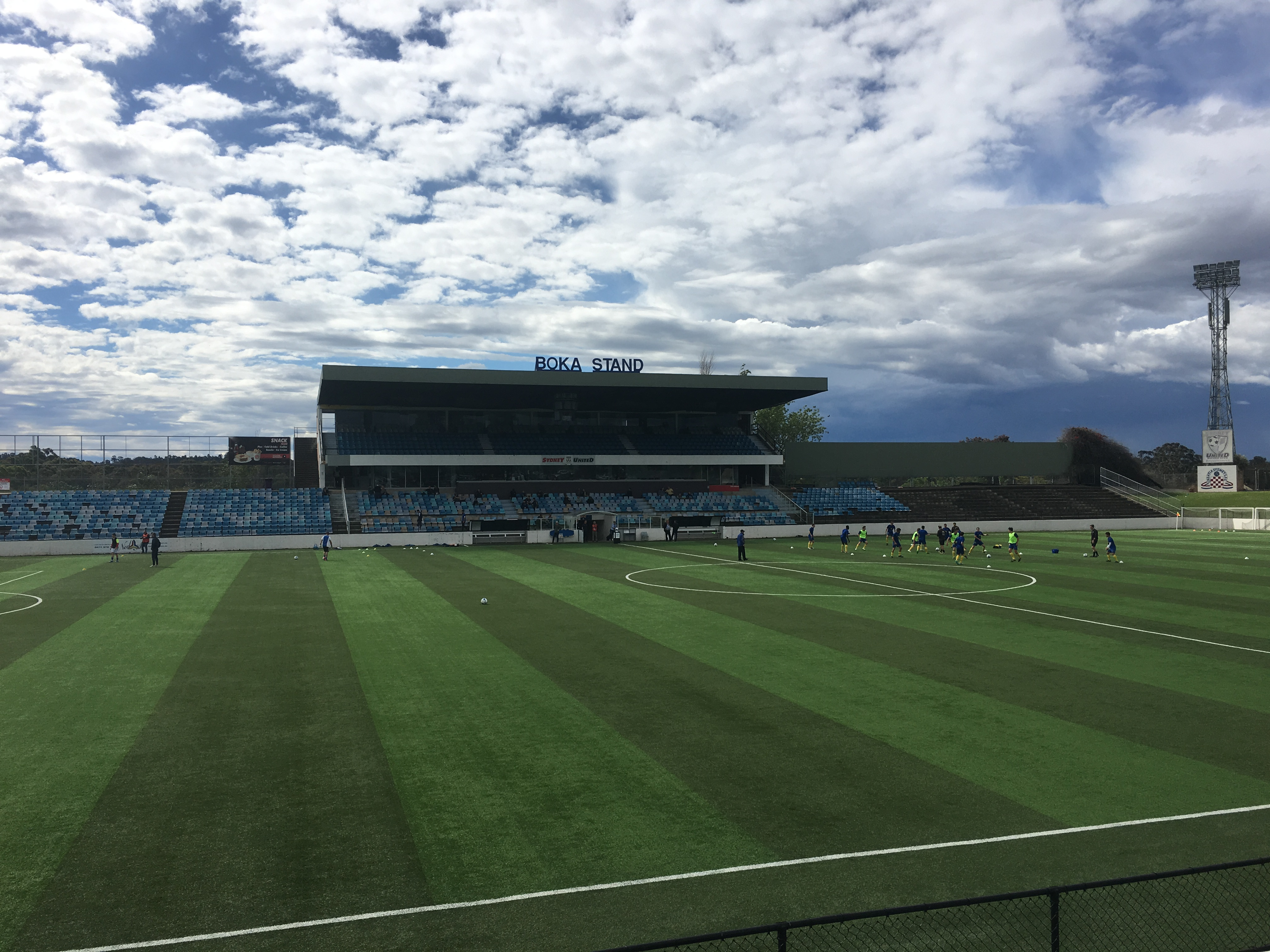
- The Boka Stand
- Interactive map of Sydney United Sports Centre
- Former names: Sydney Croatia Sports Centre; King Tomislav Park; Edensor Park; Croatian Sports Centre
- Location: 223-227 Edensor Road, Edensor Park, New South Wales 2176
- Coordinates: 33°52′33″S 150°52′27″E
- Capacity: 12,000
- Surface: Synthetic surface from 2 June 2013.
- Field size: 122 x 78 metres

Construction
- Opened: 1979
- Renovated: 1998

Tenants
- Sydney United 58; Bulls FC Academy

Sydney United Sports Centre, formerly known as Sydney Croatia Sports Centre and King Tomislav Park is a multi-use stadium in Edensor Park, Sydney, Australia. It is mainly used for football and is the home ground for the Sydney United 58. The stadium has a capacity of 12,000 people and was built in 1979 and upgraded in 1998.

== Gallery ==
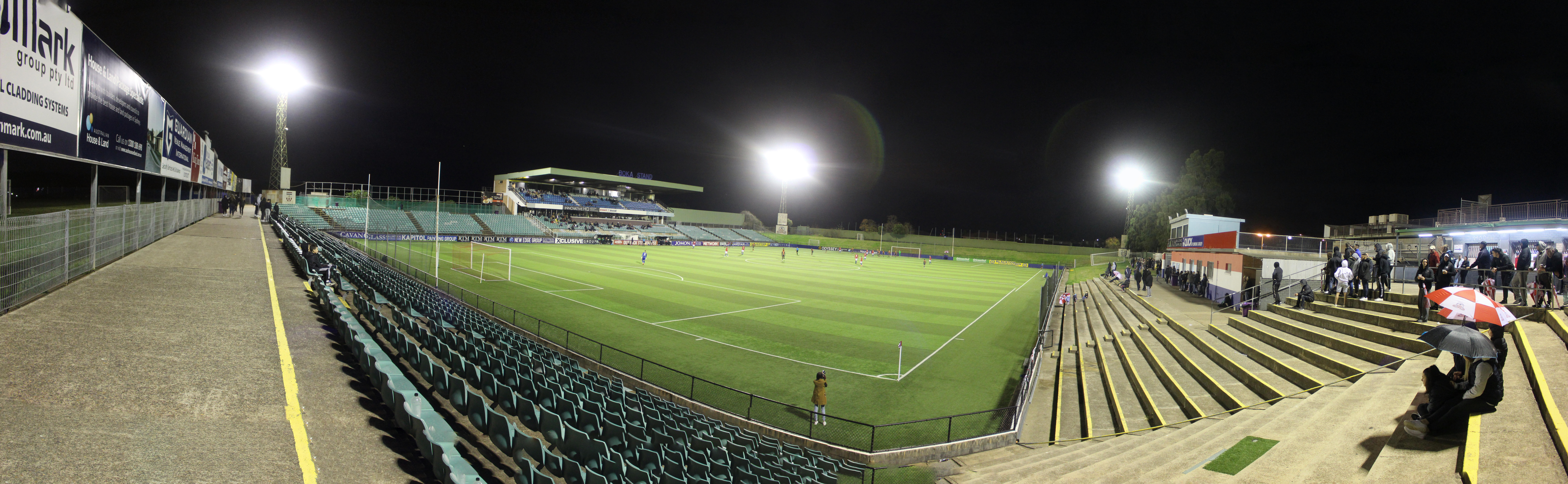
Sydney United Sports Center
