= Robbie Slater =

English-born Australian soccer player

Robbie Slater OAM
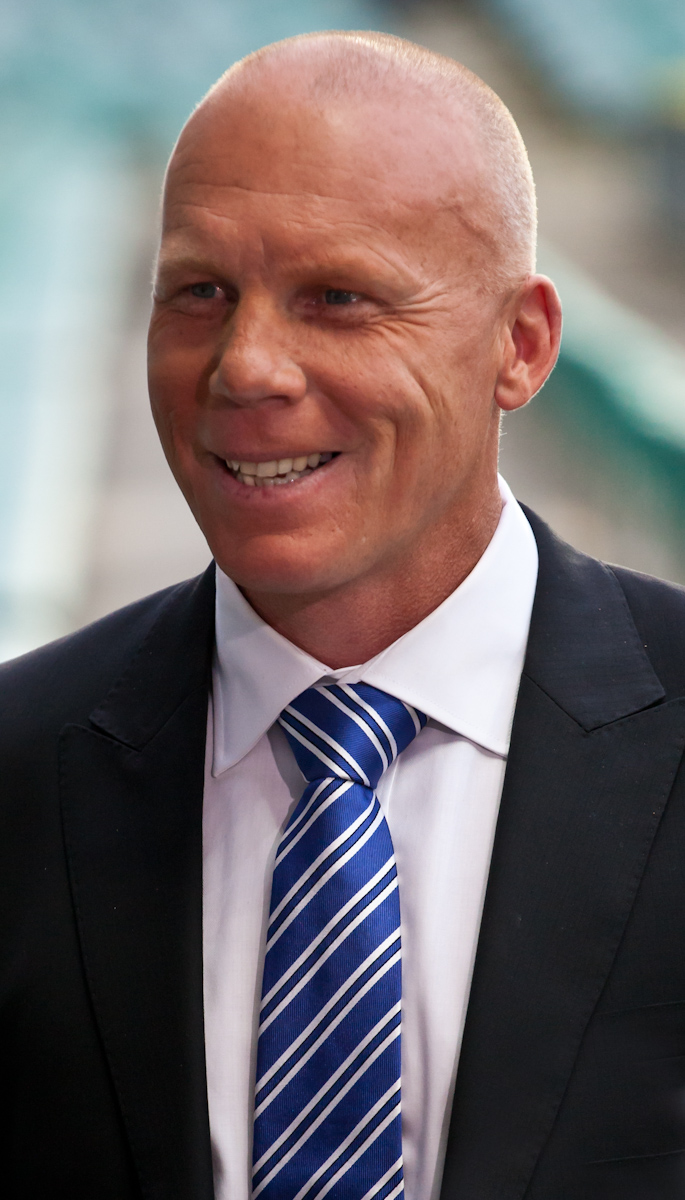
- Slater in 2010

Personal information
- Full name: Robert David Slater
- Date of birth: 22 November 1964 (age 61)
- Place of birth: Ormskirk, England
- Height: 5 ft 11 in (1.80 m)
- Position: Midfielder

Senior career*
Years	Team	Apps	(Gls)
1982–1986	St George Saints	98	(28)
1987–1989	Sydney United	73	(17)
1989–1990	Anderlecht	4	(0)
1990–1994	Lens	121	(8)
1994–1995	Blackburn Rovers	18	(0)
1995–1996	West Ham United	25	(2)
1996–1998	Southampton	41	(2)
1998	Wolverhampton Wanderers	6	(0)
1998–2001	Northern Spirit	61	(10)
Total		447	(67)

International career
1988–1997	Australia	28	(1)
Medal record
Representing Australia
Men's Association football
FIFA Confederations Cup
Runner-up	1997 Saudi Arabia
- * Club domestic league appearances and goals

Robert David Slater (born 22 November 1964) is an Australian former professional soccer player and sports commentator.

He played as a midfielder from 1982 until 2001 notably in the Premier League for Blackburn Rovers where he was amongst the title winning side of 1995. He also played in England's top flight for West Ham United and Southampton, as well as playing in the Football League for Wolverhampton Wanderers. Slater also played in Europe for Anderlecht and RC Lens as well as playing in Australia for St George Saints, Sydney United and Northern Spirit FC. He won 44 caps for Australia, scoring one goal.

== Early life ==
Slater was born in Ormskirk, Lancashire, England, and migrated to Australia with his family where he started his playing career.

== Club career ==
=== Early years ===
Slater played with various clubs in his youth before joining St George Saints in the National Soccer League in 1982. He won the NSL with St George in 1983, and following this season he trialled with Nottingham Forest. However St George and Nottingham Forest were unable to agree terms and he returned to Australia.

He then moved to Sydney Croatia in 1987 before an aborted move to Hajduk Split was quickly followed by a transfer to Anderlecht.

=== Europe ===
Slater did not see much playing time in Belgium and moved to then Ligue 2 club Lens, which was promoted during his time at the club (1990–94). While he was at Lens he was attacked with a baseball bat by Paris Saint-Germain supporters and nearly lost his life.

At the end of the 1993–94 season Slater moved to Blackburn Rovers, and there he became the first Australian to win the English FA Premier League in the 1994-95 season, starting many of the games in the first half of the season and contributing numerous assists. He was not a regular player in the second half of the season, but his 18 league appearances (six as a substitute) were more than enough to qualify for a title medal.

In August 1995, he was sold to West Ham United for £600,000 with Matty Holmes moving in the opposite direction. He made his debut on 26 August 1995 in a 1–1 draw away at Nottingham Forest with his first West Ham goal coming on 2 December 1995 in a 4–2 away defeat to his previous club, Blackburn Rovers. Slater made 29 appearances in all competitions, scoring two goals for West Ham before moving on to Southampton in August 1996.

After just one season in East London, Slater was signed for Southampton by manager Graeme Souness for a fee of £250,000 and was a regular throughout the 1996–97 season, making 30 Premier League appearances as the "Saints" avoided relegation by one point with a run of three victories in the final five games. These included a 2–0 victory over Slater's former club, Blackburn Rovers, in the penultimate game on 3 May 1997 in which Slater scored the opening goal, forcing the ball home from eight yards after a good run by Egil Østenstad.

In the FA Cup match at Reading on 4 January 1997, Slater was sent off by referee Graham Poll in the final minute of the match following a "gesture" to a linesman, as Southampton went down 3–1, finishing the match with only nine players.

In the summer of 1997, Souness left The Dell club, to be replaced by Dave Jones. Under Jones, Slater rarely played, making only three league starts with his final appearance coming as a substitute against Manchester United on 19 January 1998.

In March 1998, he was transferred to Wolverhampton Wanderers where he stayed briefly, playing as a substitute in the FA Cup semi final against Arsenal, before returning to Australia in the summer.

=== NSL ===
At the end of the 1997–98 season he moved back to Australia to captain a new team in the National Soccer League, the Northern Spirit. He would play with them until his retirement at the end of the 2000–01 season. In 2002, he was player-coach of Manly-Warringah.

== International career ==
Slater won 44 caps for the Australian national team. His final appearance for Australia was against Saudi Arabia in the 1997 Confederations Cup. He is a member of the Football Federation Australia Football Hall of Fame.

== After football ==
Slater wrote an autobiographical book in the late nineties called The Hard Way on his playing career. Slater was an analyst and commentator Fox Sports, commentating matches in the A-League, while also appearing on Fox Sports FC and Matchday Saturday, which were football coverage shows.

Slater was involved in a controversy after writing an article for the Daily Telegraph, concerning an incident with Harry Kewell. The article led to a live confrontation on Fox Sports FC. Graham Arnold was named as source in row between Harry Kewell and Robbie Slater

== Career statistics ==
#	Date	Venue	Opponent	Score	Result	Competition
1	17 June 1997	Parramatta Stadium, Sydney, Australia	Solomon Islands	1–0	6–2	1998 FIFA World Cup qualification

== Honours ==
St George

- National Soccer League: 1983

Sydney United

- National Soccer League Cup: 1987

Blackburn Rovers

- Premier League: 1994–95

Australia

- FIFA Confederations Cup: runner-up, 1997

Individual

- Oceania Footballer of the Year: 1991, 1993
- FFA Hall of Champions: 2005
- Medal of the Order of Australia for services to football
