= Wally Savor =

Australian soccer player

Personal information
- Date of birth: 21 June 1959 (age 67)
- Place of birth: Italy
- Positions: Defender; midfielder

Senior career*
Years	Team	Apps	(Gls)
1978–1980	Sydney Croatia		
1981	Riverwood		
1982–1991	Sydney Croatia	165+	(8+)

International career
1984–1989	Australia	23	(0)

Managerial career
- 2011–2012: Rockdale Ilinden
- 2017–2018: Cringila Lions
- 2018–2019: St George FC
- 2020–: Canterbury Bankstown FC
- * Club domestic league appearances and goals

Wally Savor (born 21 June 1959) is an Australian former international soccer player who played professionally as a defender or midfielder for Sydney Croatia. He played 23 times for the Australia men's national soccer team between 1984 and 1989.

== Early life ==
Savor was born in Italy to parents of Croatian ancestry and arrived in Australia as a child.

== Playing career ==
Savor began his senior career for Sydney Croatia in the New South Wales State League, playing for the club between 1978 and 1980.

In 1981, Savor played for Riverwood, before returning to Sydney Croatia. In 1984, Sydney Croatia joined the National Soccer League (NSL). Between 1984 and 1991, Savor played 165 times in the NSL for Sydney Croatia.

In November 1984, Savor made his debut for Australia against China in Beijing.

Savor was a late withdrawal from Australia's 1988 Summer Olympics team when he injured his right knee in the 1988 NSL grand final.

== Coaching career ==
Savor had previously been head coach of Rockdale Ilinden, Cringila Lions, and St George FC.

He then became head coach of Canterbury Bankstown FC.

== Honours ==
Sydney Croatia

- NSL Cup: 1987

Individual

- Soccer Australia Hall of Fame: 2003
