= Alan Hunter (soccer) =

Australian soccer player

Personal information
- Full name: Alan Hunter
- Date of birth: 30 July 1964 (age 62)
- Place of birth: Larne, Northern Ireland
- Position: Defender

Youth career
- Acacia Ridge (Qld)

Senior career*
Years	Team	Apps	(Gls)
1983–1985	Brisbane Lions SC	75	(7)
1986–1987	Heidelberg United	43	(10)
1988–1990	Sydney United	72	(13)
1990–1991	Parramatta Eagles	11	(1)
1991–1997	Brisbane Strikers	138	(22)
1997–1998	Carlton S.C.	6	(0)
1999	Manly-Warringah Dolphins		

International career
1986–1988	Australia	9	(1)

Managerial career
- 2000–2001: Sydney United
- 2003: Mingara Lakers
- 2010: Eastern Suburbs FC
- * Club domestic league appearances and goals

Alan Hunter (born 30 July 1964) was an Australian soccer player who played for several National Soccer League (NSL) clubs, most notably for the Brisbane Strikers.

Hunter was born in Northern Ireland. He won the Joe Marston Medal for best afield in the season 1996/97 Grand Final. He also played several games for the Socceroos in 'A' and 'B' international matches.
