= Tony Franken =

Australian soccer player

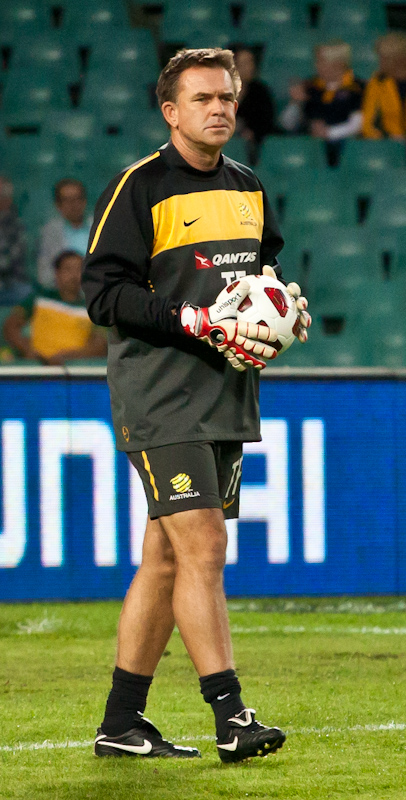

Personal information
- Full name: Anthony Franken
- Date of birth: 11 January 1965 (age 61)
- Place of birth: Perth, Western Australia, Australia
- Height: 1.78 m (5 ft 10 in)
- Position: Goalkeeper

Team information
- Current team: Australia Women (goalkeeping coach)

Youth career
- East Fremantle Tricolore

Senior career*
Years	Team	Apps	(Gls)
1982–1983	A.I.S.		
1984–1986	Canberra City SC	65	(0)
1987–1991	Sydney Croatia	91	(0)
1991–1992	APIA	24	(0)
1992–1993	Sydney Croatia	15	(0)
1993	Sutherland Sharks	8	(0)
1993–1994	Sydney Croatia	1	(0)
1994	Rockdale Ilinden	11	(0)
1994–1995	Parramatta Eagles	24	(0)
1996–1997	Sydney Olympic FC	16	(0)
1997–2003	Perth Glory	39	(0)

International career
1983	Australia U20	3	(0)
1984	Australia U23	0	(0)
1984–1985	Australia B	6	(0)
1992	Australia	2	(0)
- * Club domestic league appearances and goals

Anthony "Tony" Franken (born 11 January 1965) is an Australian professional soccer goalkeeper coach and former professional goalkeeper. He is currently the goalkeeping coach of the Australian women's national football team.

== Biography ==
Franken represented Australia on 14 occasions between 1984 and 1992 and represented his country at Under-20 level at the 1983 World Youth Cup Finals in Mexico and at Under-23 level in 1984.

Franken started playing junior soccer for East Fremantle Tricolore before he played for many professional clubs in Australia including Sydney Croatia, APIA Leichhardt, Perth Glory, Sydney Olympic, Parramatta Eagles and Canberra City. He was awarded the NSL Under 21 Player of the Year in 1984.

Between 2006 and 2018 he was the goalkeeper coach for the Australian men's national soccer team. Since 2020, he has been the goalkeeping coach for the Australian women's national soccer team.
