= 1988 National Soccer League =

Australian soccer season

National Soccer League
- Season: 1988
- Dates: 29 January – 3 September 1984
- Champions: Marconi Fairfield; 2nd title
- Premiers: Wollongong City; 1st title
- Relegated: Brunswick Juventus; Brisbane Lions
- Matches: 188
- Goals: 501 (2.66 per match)
- Top goalscorer: Frank Farina (17)
- Biggest home win: St George-Budapest 6–0 Adelaide City (7 February 1988)
- Biggest away win: Brisbane Lions 1–5 St George-Budapest (3 April 1988); Brunswick Juventus 0–4 Preston Makedonia (31 July 1988)
- Highest scoring: South Melbourne 5–4 APIA Leichhardt (20 March 1988)
- Highest attendance: 17,064; Sydney Croatia 2–2 Marconi Fairfield (3 September 1988, Grand Final)
- Lowest attendance: 600; Melbourne Croatia 0–2 Brunswick Zebras (7 August 1988)
- Total attendance: 545,935
- Average attendance: 2,904

The 1988 National Soccer League season, was the 12th season of the National Soccer League in Australia.

== League table ==
Pos	Team	Pld	W	D	L	GF	GA	GD	Pts	Qualification or relegation
1	Wollongong City	26	13	8	5	44	32	+12	34	Qualification for the Finals series
2	Sydney Croatia	26	15	4	7	38	30	+8	34	Qualification for the Finals series
3	South Melbourne	26	13	8	5	36	29	+7	34	Qualification for the Finals series
4	Marconi Fairfield (C)	26	12	8	6	46	26	+20	32	Qualification for the Finals series
5	Sydney Olympic	26	9	9	8	28	22	+6	27	Qualification for the Finals series
6	Adelaide City	26	10	7	9	36	35	+1	27	
7	Sunshine George Cross	26	11	5	10	38	39	−1	27	
8	St George-Budapest	26	10	6	10	41	35	+6	26	
9	Melbourne Croatia	26	9	6	11	28	33	−5	24	
10	Footscray JUST	26	7	9	10	34	32	+2	23	
11	APIA Leichhardt	26	8	7	11	28	35	−7	23	
12	Preston Makedonia	26	5	12	9	29	35	−6	22	
13	Brunswick Juventus (R)	26	7	5	14	31	43	−12	19	Relegation to the Victorian State League
14	Brisbane Lions (R)	26	4	4	18	28	59	−31	12	Relegation to the Brisbane Premier League

Source: rsssf.com
Rules for classification: 1) points; 2) goal difference; 3) number of goals scored.
(C) Champions; (R) Relegated

== Results ==
Home \ Away	ADE	API	BRI	BRU	FOO	MAR	MEL	PRE	SOU	STG	SGC	SYC	SYO	WOL
Adelaide City		0–1	5–1	0–0	3–2	1–1	2–0	1–1	1–0	2–1	0–0	2–3	1–0	2–3
APIA Leichhardt	1–1		2–0	2–1	2–2	0–2	3–1	1–1	0–2	0–1	1–3	0–1	1–0	1–1
Brisbane Lions	1–3	0–0		1–0	4–2	3–1	0–1	1–1	1–3	1–5	2–3	4–0	1–1	2–3
Brunswick Juventus	0–3	0–2	3–0		2–1	1–0	0–1	0–4	1–2	2–1	4–2	2–0	0–0	1–2
Footscray JUST	2–2	2–0	2–0	4–1		0–1	0–0	1–2	1–1	2–1	1–1	3–0	0–1	0–0
Marconi Fairfield	2–1	3–1	3–0	2–1	0–1		1–1	2–0	1–1	3–1	6–0	1–1	1–1	1–1
Melbourne Croatia	4–1	0–1	1–1	0–2	2–0	0–2		1–0	0–1	2–1	2–1	1–1	3–1	0–1
Preston Makedonia	0–0	2–0	3–0	4–3	1–1	2–2	1–4		0–0	0–0	1–4	0–2	0–3	1–1
South Melbourne	2–1	5–4	2–1	0–0	1–1	3–0	1–1	2–1		0–2	1–4	1–0	2–1	2–1
St George-Budapest	6–0	0–2	3–2	1–1	2–0	3–2	1–1	1–1	1–1		3–1	0–1	0–1	2–1
Sunshine George Cross	1–2	1–0	2–0	3–3	1–0	0–3	2–0	1–1	1–0	4–1		1–0	0–2	0–1
Sydney Croatia	1–0	4–2	1–0	3–1	2–0	3–2	2–0	3–2	1–3	1–1	1–0		3–0	1–1
Sydney Olympic	0–1	1–1	3–1	2–0	1–1	0–0	3–1	1–0	0–0	1–2	1–1	3–0		0–1
Wollongong City	2–1	0–0	6–1	3–2	1–4	0–4	4–1	0–0	4–0	3–1	3–1	0–3	1–1	

Source: OzFootball
Legend: Blue = home team win; Yellow = draw; Red = away team win.

== Finals series ==
Elimination and qualifying Finals
2	Sydney Croatia	2
3	South Melbourne	1
4	Marconi Fairfield	3
5	Sydney Olympic	1

Semi-finals
1	Wollongong City	0 (3)
2	Sydney Croatia (p)	0 (4)
3	South Melbourne	1
4	Marconi Fairfield	2

Preliminary Final
1	Wollongong City	0
4	Marconi Fairfield	2

Grand Final
2	Sydney Croatia	2 (4)
4	Marconi Fairfield (p)	2 (5)

== Individual awards ==
- Player(s) of the Year: Paul Wade (South Melbourne); Frank Farina (Marconi Fairfield)
- U-21 Player of the Year: Paul Trimboli (South Melbourne)
- Top Scorer: Frank Farina (Marconi Fairfield) – 16 goals
- Coach of the Year: Brian Garvey (South Melbourne)
