= Graham Arnold =

Australian professional football manager

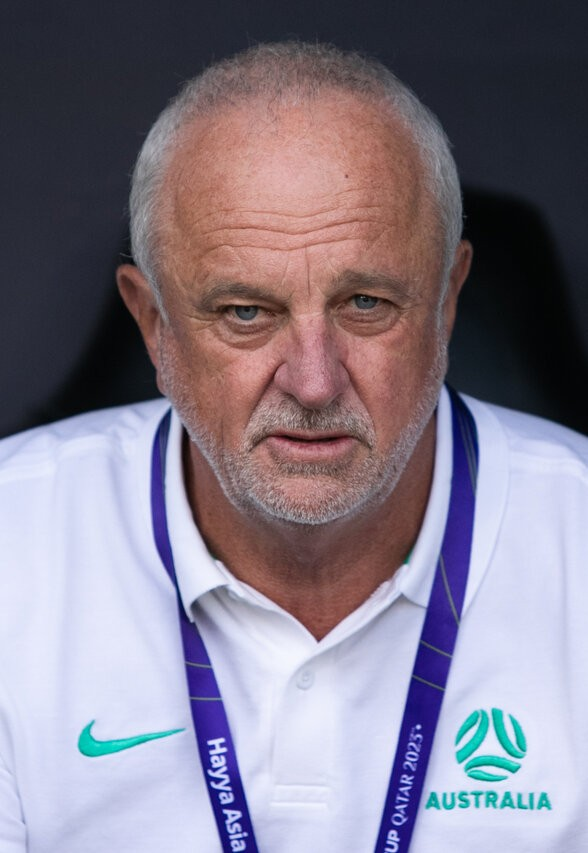
- Arnold with Australia in 2023

Personal information
- Full name: Graham James Arnold
- Date of birth: 3 August 1963 (age 63)
- Place of birth: Sydney, New South Wales, Australia
- Height: 1.79 m (5 ft 10 in)
- Position: Forward

Team information
- Current team: Iraq (head coach)

Senior career*
| Years | Team | Apps | (Gls) |
| 1980–1981 | Canterbury-Marrickville | | |
| 1981–1990 | Sydney United | 178 | (69) |
| 1990–1992 | Roda JC | 61 | (22) |
| 1992–1994 | Liège | 60 | (23) |
| 1994–1995 | Charleroi | 16 | (1) |
| 1995–1997 | NAC Breda | 63 | (35) |
| 1997–1998 | Sanfrecce Hiroshima | 28 | (7) |
| 1998–2000 | Northern Spirit | 47 | (5) |
| Total | | 453 | (161) |

International career
| 1985 | Australia B | 2 | (1) |
| 1985–1997 | Australia | 56 | (19) |

Managerial career
- 1989–1990: Sydney United
- 1998–2000: Northern Spirit
- 2006–2007: Australia
- 2007–2008: Australia U23
- 2010–2013: Central Coast Mariners
- 2014: Vegalta Sendai
- 2014–2018: Sydney FC
- 2018–2021: Australia U23
- 2018–2024: Australia
- 2025–: Iraq
Medal record
Representing Australia (as manager)
Men's Association football
AFC U-23 Asian Cup
| Third place | 2020 Thailand |
- * Club domestic league appearances and goals

Graham James Arnold (born 3 August 1963) is an Australian professional football manager and former player who is the head coach of the Iraq national team.

Arnold was first appointed to work as assistant coach of the Australian men's national soccer team (the Socceroos) in 2000. After head coach Frank Farina was sacked in 2005, Arnold worked with Guus Hiddink for the 2006 FIFA World Cup campaign, in which they made the second round of the finals. After Hiddink left, he became interim coach of the Socceroos. Arnold went on to qualify Australia's U23 men's national soccer team (nicknamed the Olyroos) for the 2008 Beijing Olympics. Arnold then went on to assist Pim Verbeek for qualification of the 2010 FIFA World Cup in South Africa.

Arnold's next move was to take the manager role at struggling A-League club the Central Coast Mariners between 2010 and 2013, where he guided the club to a Premiership and a Championship. He went on to win two Premierships, one Championship and an FFA Cup with Sydney FC.

In 2018, Arnold replaced Bert van Marwijk as Australian coach after the 2018 FIFA World Cup. Under Arnold, Australia qualified for the 2022 FIFA World Cup, during which Australia achieved their most successful World Cup campaign: after recording multiple group stage wins for the first time, with their only group stage loss being to eventual runners-up France, Australia qualified for the Round of 16 for the second time in their history, where they narrowly lost to eventual champions Argentina. He resigned from the role in September 2024. He was appointed head coach of the Iraq national team.

Arnold holds a number of A-League records: he has managed the fourth most games of any manager in the A-League (211), he has achieved the third most wins in the competition's history (116), he has the third-best career winning percentage of any A-League manager with 30+ games managed (54.9%), he has the best career unbeaten percentage of any A-League manager (81.5%), and he is one of just three managers to have won multiple A-League championships. Arnold also holds the records for most games coached, and most games won, as manager of Australia. He is a member of the Football Federation Australia Football Hall of Fame.

== Early life and education life ==
Graham James Arnold was born in Sydney, New South Wales.

== Club career ==
Arnold was a striker who started his career at Gwawley Bay in 1969. He played for them and Sutherland representative teams concurrently until 1979 when he moved to Canterbury-Marrickville in the New South Wales Premier League. He then moved to Sydney Croatia in Australia's now defunct National Soccer League, where he was both the league's top goal scorer and player of the year in 1986. This was followed by a move overseas, where he made a name for himself in the Netherlands, playing for Roda JC Kerkrade and NAC Breda. He also spent time in Belgium with R.F.C. de Liège and R. Charleroi S.C. He went on to play for Sanfrecce Hiroshima in Japan towards the end of his career, before finally returning home to play for the Northern Spirit FC.

== International career ==
Graham Arnold has represented Australia's senior national team 56 times in 'A' international matches, scoring 19 goals (85 caps, 33 goals including unofficial matches and 'B' internationals). He was given his full debut by Frank Arok in a World Cup Qualifier against Taiwan at Adelaide's Hindmarsh Stadium on 23 October 1985. He scored on his debut as the "Socceroos" went on to record a 7–0 victory. His international playing career came to a sad end on 29 November 1997 in a World Cup Qualifier against Iran at the MCG when the score ended 2–2 and Australia was eliminated on the away goals rule after leading 2–0.

== Managerial career ==
Arnold had a cameo role as a coach very early on in his career. He was coach for two games while he was a player at Sydney Croatia during the 1989/90 season. However, his proper coaching career started in 1998, when he was appointed player/manager of the Northern Spirit FC. He was the coach for two seasons, making the playoffs in their debut season.

=== Australia ===
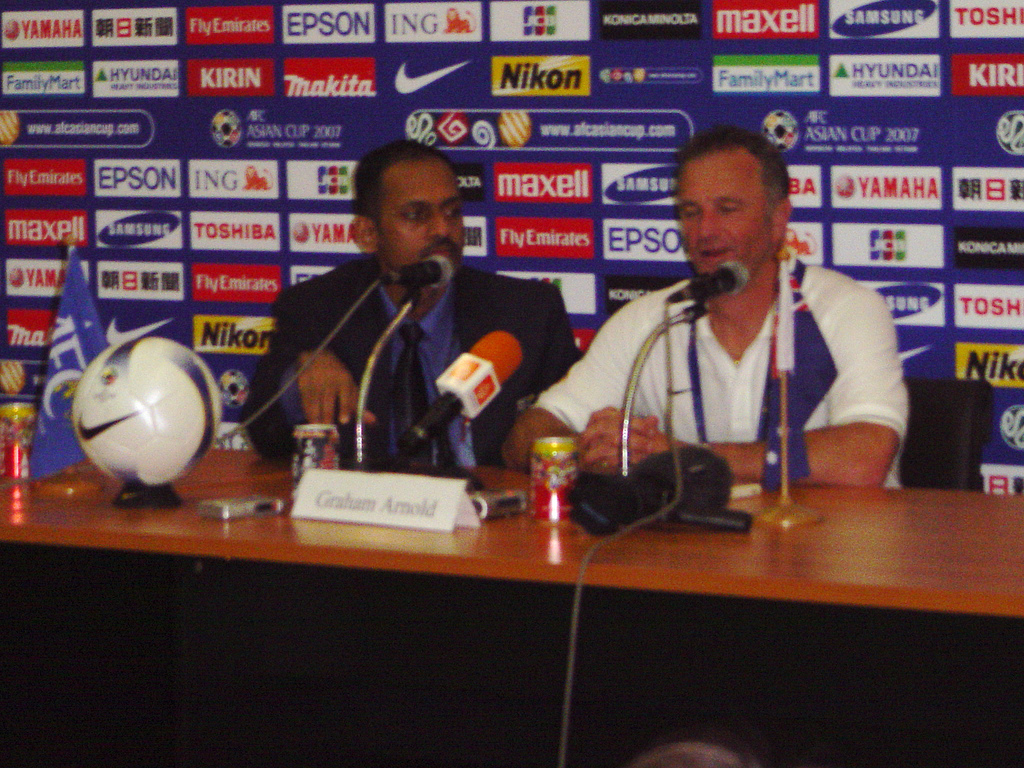
Arnold (right) in 2007

He was then appointed to the position of Australian assistant coach in 2000, becoming interim coach in July 2006.

On 6 September 2006 Australia was defeated 2–0 in an Asian Cup qualifying game against Kuwait. The FFA confirmed Arnold would remain head coach through to the end of 2007 Asian Cup campaign.

Australia started their Asian Cup campaign drawing with Oman in its opening group stage game in Bangkok. On 13 July 2007 Australia were beaten 3–1 by the eventual winners Iraq in the 2007 Asian Cup. Australia lost to Japan in penalty shootout in the Quarter Finals and Arnold then continued in the role as manager of the Australian U-23 side, qualifying through to the 2008 Olympics.

He was also linked with the manager's position at Bolton Wanderers and Norwich City in England but lost out to Gary Megson and Glenn Roeder respectively. With the appointment of Dutchman Pim Verbeek as the Australian manager, Arnold along with Henk Duut served as his assistant to the national side during the 2010 FIFA World Cup in South Africa.

=== Central Coast Mariners ===
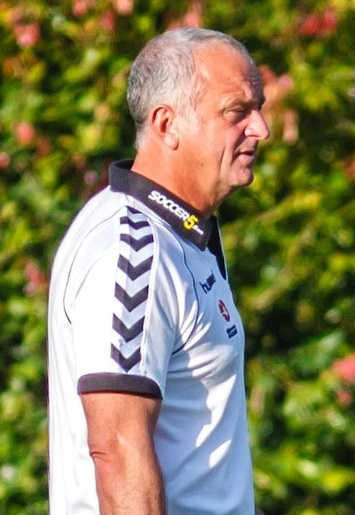
Arnold managing the Central Coast Mariners in 2012

On 9 February 2010, it was announced that Arnold will take on the position of head coach for the Central Coast Mariners until the end of the 2012–2013 season. Arnold is recognised as one of the A-League's greatest ever managers, in part due to his contribution to the Central Coast Mariners Football Club between 2010 and 2013. At the conclusion of the 2011–12 A-League season he rejected a lucrative contract from Sydney FC and decided to stay on with the Mariners signing a one-year extension to his original contract with the club. In his three full seasons with the Mariners, Arnold guided the club to two A-League Grand Finals (winning one), as well as the 2011–12 A-League Premiership. On 21 April 2013, he guided the Mariners to a 2–0 victory over Western Sydney Wanderers to win the A-League Championship for the first time in the club's history. This success in Australia's top flight ensured that the Mariners secured three successive qualifications for the AFC Champions League in 2012, 2013, and 2014. In 2013, Arnold guided the Mariners to the knockout phase of Asia's premier club competition, in part thanks to a stunning 1–0 win away to Suwon Bluewings in Suwon, Korea Republic just 48 hours after their 2013 A-League Grand Final victory in Sydney, Australia.

Arnold is also recognised for having developed many young Australian talents during his time with the Mariners. Australian internationals Tom Rogic, Trent Sainsbury, Mathew Ryan, Mitchell Duke, Mustafa Amini, Bernie Ibini, and Oliver Bozanic all developed their game under Arnold at the Mariners, and went on to enjoy great careers abroad. Some of Arnold's tenure at the Central Coast Mariners is highlighted in the 2013 fly-on-the-wall sports documentary 'The Code: Life with the Mariners'. The documentary charts the team's 2013 A-League Grand Final winning season, showcasing the culture and unity of the club under Arnold, as well as other characters and contributors at the club.

=== Vegalta Sendai ===
In the month of November 2013 Graham was a target for a few clubs in Asia, especially Vegalta Sendai in Japan's J1 League. Although interest again raised from the Australian Football Federation to make Graham the national team coach, he always wanted to stay in club football over the national team setup and within weeks agreed terms with Sendai to be the first Australian coach to coach at the highest level in Japanese football. Graham recruited his assistant from the Central Coast Mariners Andrew Clark to join him in Japan. On 9 April 2014, it was announced by Vegalta Sendai that Arnold had mutually terminated his contract.

=== Sydney FC ===
==== 2014–15 season ====
Arnold was appointed as the new head coach of Sydney FC on 8 May 2014. In his first season with the Sky Blues, they were runners-up in the 2014–15 A-League season, finishing second behind Melbourne Victory, and losing the 2015 A-League Grand Final to them.

==== 2015–16 season ====
After the successful 2014–15 season, they saw an unsuccessful 2015–16 A-League season, finishing in 7th place and missing out on the Finals Series. He was, however, able to lead the team to a top place finish in Group H for their 2016 AFC Champions League campaign. They were eventually knocked out by Chinese team Shandong Luneng 3–3 on aggregate in the Round of 16.

==== 2016–17 season ====
Arnold started his revamp of the squad by releasing 13 players in the pre-season. To solve the teams goalscoring issues, he bought in Brazilian striker Bobô as their new marquee to play alongside former teammate Filip Hološko under the new 2 marquee rule. In addition to this, he also brought in 5 Australian players, including Bernie Ibini on loan, Socceroo Alex Wilkinson (two whom have worked with Arnold at the Central Coast) and Danny Vukovic from rival club Melbourne Victory. The season started off with a bang, with Sydney FC defeating their rivals Western Sydney Wanderers 4–0 in round 1. He led the team to a runners-up finish after being defeated 1–0 in the FFA Cup Final by Melbourne City.

Into the January transfer window, fan favourite Matthew Jurman joined K-League club Suwon Samsung Bluewings, while keeper Vedran Janjetović swapped with Andrew Redmayne to cross city rivals, Western Sydney Wanderers after a dispute about not playing after being displaced by Vukovic. To replace Jurman, Dutch defender Jordy Buijs signed. The team was able to go on undefeated for 19 games in the league before eventually being defeated 1–0 in a controversial game against the Wanderers. This defeat only made the team stronger, as they went the remainder of the season undefeated, gaining 19 points out of a possible 21 for the remaining 7 games. His team was eventually crowned premiers after Melbourne Victory was unable to defeat Brisbane Roar, while Sydney had 4 games remaining. Arnold's 3rd season with Sydney proved fruitful, in addition to winning the premiership, the squad had broken multiple records, including the most points in a single season, breaking Brisbane Roar's 2010–11 season of 65 points in 3 fewer games with 66 points, as well as being the only top-flight football team in Australia to stay outright 1st throughout the whole season. Arnold was also named Coach of the Year at the Dolan Warren Gala Night. He ended the season with a 1–1 in the Grand Final, winning 4–2 on penalties against Melbourne Victory, becoming the first manager to win the championship with more than one club.

==== 2017–18 season ====
Arnold went on to win the 2017–18 Premiership, becoming the first coach in A League history to win back-to-back Premierships.

One of the highlights of Arnold's tenure at Sydney FC was his ability to recruit impactful foreign players to the club. Arnold signed the likes of Milos Ninkovic, Bobo, Filip Holosko, Adrian Mierzejewski, and Marc Janko to the Sky Blues, each of whom made telling contributions to Sydney's success between 2014 and 2018 alongside a raft of key Australian players including Brandon O'Neill, Rhyan Grant, Andrew Redmayne, and Joshua Brillante.

=== Return to the Australian national team ===
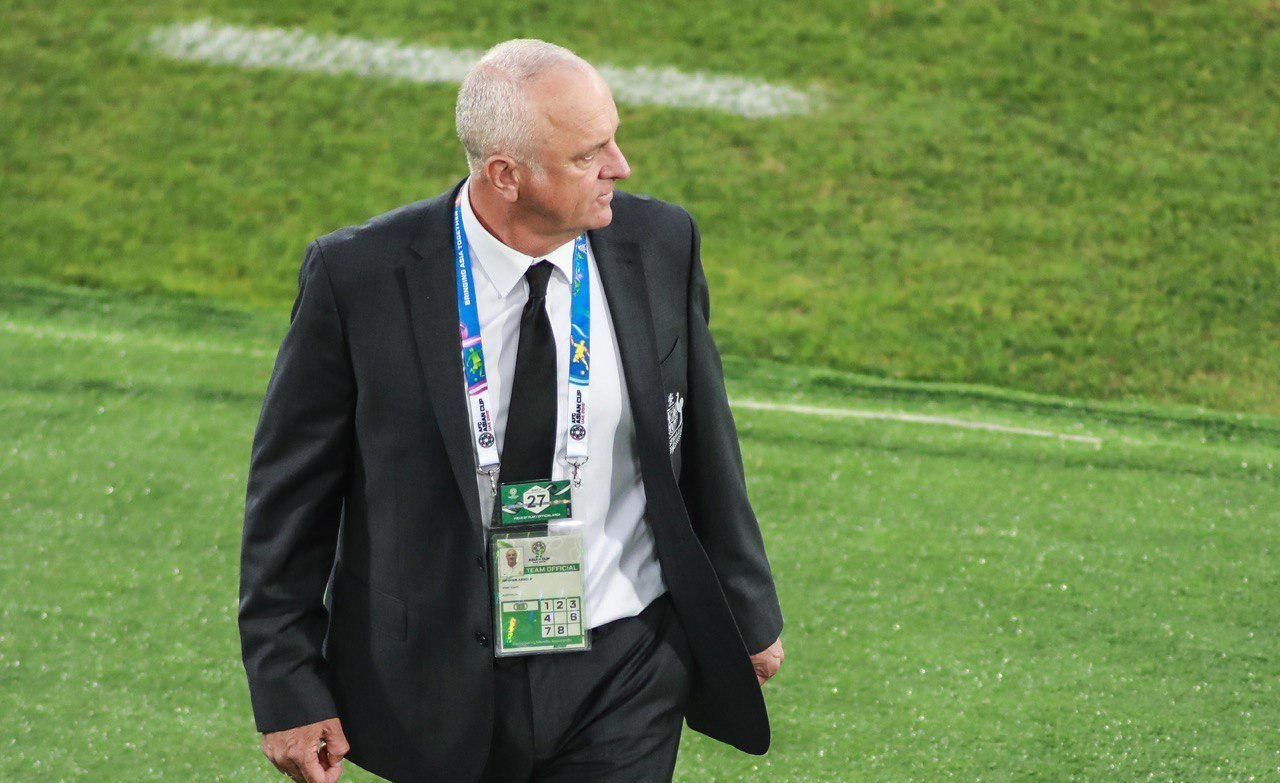
Arnold managing Australia at 2019 AFC Asian Cup

On 8 March 2018, after a vigorous search, it was announced that he would replace Bert van Marwijk as Australian coach after the 2018 FIFA World Cup following his notable success with A-League club Sydney FC, as well as also taking charge of the Olyroos. Almost immediately after Australia's uninspired performance at the tournament reached its climax, Arnold officially took the reins in the box seat of the national team. He opened his account strongly, with his team executing a comprehensive 4–0 win away to Kuwait national football team. In November 2018, Arnold's men were given their first genuine test of what was proclaimed by Australian media as the 'new era' of the Socceroos, drawing 1–1 against rivals South Korea in front of 32,922 fans at Brisbane's Lang Park in a friendly on 18 November 2018. On the day prior to the match, Arnold announced that Socceroos veteran Mark Milligan would be appointed captain for an indefinite period.

His first tournament on his second stint was the 2019 AFC Asian Cup, where Australia, as the defending champions, unexpectedly lost their opening game to Jordan 0–1 before ending the campaign at the quarter-finals with the same scoreline, this time to the hosts on the same stadium, thus suffered criticisms for the team's poor form in the tournament. Despite criticisms, he was able to guide the Olyroos to a third-place finish in 2020 AFC U-23 Championship, thus qualifying for the 2020 Summer Olympics (delayed a year due to the COVID-19 pandemic), as well as achieving for the first-time ever a straight eight wins in the second round of 2022 FIFA World Cup qualifiers to reach the third round.

In June 2022, Arnold guided Australia to its fifth consecutive FIFA World Cup Finals appearance, leading the Socceroos to play-off wins over UAE on 7 June, and Peru on 13 June in Doha, Qatar. In the second play-off against Peru, Arnold made a key decision prior to the penalty shoot-out, substituting goalkeeper captain Mathew Ryan for Andrew Redmayne. Redmayne performed strongly in the shoot-out, saving a decisive penalty to help lift Australia to another World Cup; Arnold himself had been subjects of heavy criticism for Australia's under-performance at the third round of the 2022 FIFA World Cup qualification.

In the 2022 FIFA World Cup, Arnold defied all odds and criticism aimed against him, leading Australia to the round of 16 for only the second time after 2006 when he was an assistant coach, following 1–0 wins over Tunisia and Denmark in the last two group stage matches, making him the first Australian-born manager to achieve this feat, as well as the first Australia manager to win multiple matches in the same FIFA World Cup tournament. Australia were later eliminated by Argentina after a thrilling 2–1 defeat, despite the Socceroos putting up late scare to equalize. Following the tournament, Arnold was named the best coach at the 2022 World Cup by French sports newspaper L'Équipe and had his contract extended to the 2026 FIFA World Cup, as he urged Australian officials to do more to promote football across the country.

In the third round of 2026 FIFA World Cup qualification, Australia had a bad start, with the first game losing to Bahrain at home soil 0–1, followed by a scoreless draw against Indonesia. On 20 September, Arnold decided to resign as the Socceroos head coach, he became the longest-serving coach in Socceroos history for 6 years.

=== Iraq ===
On 9 May 2025, Arnold was appointed as the new head coach of the Iraq national team during the third round of the 2026 FIFA World Cup qualifying campaign succeeding Jesús Casas. Arnold was tasked with leading Iraq's campaign in the 2026 FIFA World Cup qualification, which extended to the AFC fifth round, where they defeated the United Arab Emirates 3–2 on aggregate. In the inter-confederation play-offs, Iraq faced Bolivia and secured a 2–1 victory, qualifying for the 2026 FIFA World Cup for the first time since 1986.

== Recognition ==
Arnold Place in the Sydney suburb of Glenwood is named for him.

In July 2024, with the support of the Sutherland Shire Council and Gwawley Bay Football Club, the Canberra Road Oval in Sylvania, New South Wales was renamed the Graham Arnold Oval in honour of Arnold's career and achievements. The oval is the home ground of Gwawley Bay Football Club, to which Arnold and his family had a strong connection; the club was Arnold's first football club, with Arnold's parents and brother all serving as dedicated volunteers at the club over the years.

== Personal life ==
Arnold's daughter, Elissa Arnold, was as of February 2017 partner of Trent Sainsbury, a Socceroo player.

== Career statistics ==
=== Club ===
Appearances and goals by club, season and competition
| Club | Season | League | | |
| Club | Season | Division | Apps | Goals |
|---|---|---|---|---|
| Sydney Croatia | 1985 | National Soccer League | 28 | 11 |
| Sydney Croatia | 1986 | National Soccer League | 25 | 12 |
| Sydney Croatia | 1987 | National Soccer League | 24 | 17 |
| Sydney Croatia | 1988 | National Soccer League | 23 | 7 |
| Sydney Croatia | 1989 | National Soccer League | 27 | 10 |
| Sydney Croatia | 1989–90 | National Soccer League | 26 | 6 |
| Sydney Croatia | Total | | 153 | 63 |
| Roda | 1990–91 | Eredivisie | 28 | 8 |
| Roda | 1991–92 | Eredivisie | 33 | 14 |
| Roda | Total | | 61 | 22 |
| Liège | 1992–93 | Belgian First Division | 32 | 16 |
| Liège | 1993–94 | Belgian First Division | 28 | 7 |
| Liège | Total | | 60 | 23 |
| Charleroi | 1994–95 | Belgian First Division | 16 | 1 |
| NAC Breda | 1994–95 | Eredivisie | 15 | 10 |
| NAC Breda | 1995–96 | Eredivisie | 30 | 16 |
| NAC Breda | 1996–97 | Eredivisie | 18 | 9 |
| NAC Breda | Total | | 63 | 35 |
| Sanfrecce Hiroshima | 1997 | J1 League | 18 | 6 |
| Sanfrecce Hiroshima | 1998 | J1 League | 10 | 1 |
| Sanfrecce Hiroshima | Total | | 28 | 7 |
| Northern Spirit | 1998–99 | National Soccer League | 28 | 5 |
| Northern Spirit | 1999–2000 | National Soccer League | 6 | 0 |
| Northern Spirit | 2000–01 | National Soccer League | 13 | 0 |
| Northern Spirit | Total | | 47 | 5 |
| Career total | | | 428 | 156 |

=== International ===
Appearances and goals by national team and year
| National team | Year | Apps | Goals |
|---|---|---|---|
| Australia | 1985 | 2 | 1 |
| Australia | 1986 | 6 | 4 |
| Australia | 1987 | 6 | 3 |
| Australia | 1988 | 16 | 4 |
| Australia | 1989 | 4 | 2 |
| Australia | 1990 | 0 | 0 |
| Australia | 1991 | 2 | 0 |
| Australia | 1992 | 0 | 0 |
| Australia | 1993 | 6 | 1 |
| Australia | 1994 | 0 | 0 |
| Australia | 1995 | 2 | 1 |
| Australia | 1996 | 3 | 0 |
| Australia | 1997 | 7 | 3 |
| Total | | 54 | 19 |

Scores and results list Australia's goal tally first, score column indicates score after each Arnold goal.

List of international goals scored by Graham Arnold
| No. | Date | Venue | Opponent | Score | Result | Competition |
|---|---|---|---|---|---|---|
| 1 | 4 August 1985 | St George Stadium, Banksia, Australia | (Socialist Federal Republic of Yugoslavia) Red Star Belgrade | 4–1 | 4–1 | Friendly |
| 2 | 9 August 1985 | Hindmarsh Stadium, Adelaide, Australia | (Socialist Federal Republic of Yugoslavia) Red Star Belgrade | 1–4 | 1–4 | Friendly |
| 3 | 11 August 1985 | Olympic Park Stadium, Melbourne, Australia | (Socialist Federal Republic of Yugoslavia) Red Star Belgrade | 4–0 | 4–0 | Friendly |
| 4 | 25 September 1985 | St George Stadium, Banksia, Australia | China | 1–1 | 1–1 | Friendly |
| 5 | 23 October 1985 | Hindmarsh Stadium, Adelaide, Australia | Chinese Taipei | 6–0 | 7–0 | 1986 FIFA World Cup qualification |
| 6 | 3 August 1986 | Olympic Park Stadium, Melbourne, Australia | Czechoslovakia | 1–1 | 1–1 | Friendly |
| 7 | 25 October 1986 | Mount Smart Stadium, Auckland, New Zealand | New Zealand | 1–0 | 1–1 | Trans-Tasman trophy |
| 8 | 2 November 1986 | Parramatta Stadium, Australia | New Zealand | 1–0 | 2–0 | Trans-Tasman trophy |
| 9 | 23 November 1986 | Canton, China | China | 2–0 | 2–0 | Ampol Cup Trophy |
| 10 | 11 June 1987 | Kyong Ju, South Korea | Chile | 2–0 | 2–0 | Korea Cup |
| 11 | 15 June 1987 | Suwon, South Korea | South Korea | 4–0 | 5–0 | Korea Cup |
| 12 | 21 June 1987 | Seoul Olympic Stadium, Seoul, South Korea | South Korea | 1–1 | 1–1 | Korea Cup |
| 13 | 15 November 1987 | Taipei, Taiwan | Taiwan | 1–0 | 3–0 | Friendly |
| 14 | 15 November 1987 | Taipei, Taiwan | Taiwan | 2–0 | 3–0 | Friendly |
| 15 | 3 February 1988 | Olympic Park Stadium, Melbourne, Australia | (Socialist Federal Republic of Yugoslavia) GNK Dinamo Zagreb | 1–1 | 1–1 | Friendly |
| 16 | 26 February 1988 | Bruce Stadium, Canberra, Australia | Taiwan | 1–0 | 3–0 | 1988 Olympic Games Qualifying |
| 17 | 26 February 1988 | Bruce Stadium, Canberra, Australia | Taiwan | 2–0 | 3–0 | 1988 Olympic Games Qualifying |
| 18 | 27 March 1988 | Eden Park, Auckland, New Zealand | Taiwan | 1–0 | 3–0 | 1988 Olympic Games Qualifying |
| 19 | 3 December 1988 | Macquarie Field | Fiji | 4–0 | 5–1 | 1990 FIFA World Cup qualification |
| 20 | 22 February 1989 | Parramatta Stadium, Australia | (Sweden) Malmö FF | 1–0 | 3–0 | Friendly |
| 21 | 12 March 1989 | Sydney Football Stadium, Sydney, Australia | New Zealand | 2–0 | 4–1 | 1990 FIFA World Cup qualification |
| 22 | 12 March 1989 | Sydney Football Stadium, Sydney, Australia | New Zealand | 3–0 | 4–1 | 1990 FIFA World Cup qualification |
| 23 | 2 February 1990 | Olympic Park Stadium, Melbourne, Australia | (Soviet Union) FC Torpedo Moscow | 2–0 | 3–0 | Friendly |
| 24 | 2 February 1990 | Olympic Park Stadium, Melbourne, Australia | (Soviet Union) FC Torpedo Moscow | 3–0 | 3–0 | Friendly |
| 25 | 10 June 1991 | Taegu, South Korea | United States | 2–2 | 4–2 | Friendly |
| 26 | 12 June 1991 | Pohang, South Korea | South Korea | 1–0 | 2–0 | Friendly |
| 27 | 26 February 1993 | Papendaal, Netherlands | (Netherlands) Vitesse Arnhem | 1–0 | 1–0 | Friendly |
| 28 | 16 July 1993 | Bersenberg, Germany | (Germany) MSV Duisburg | 1–0 | 1–0 | Friendly |
| 29 | 30 May 1993 | Auckland, New Zealand | New Zealand | 1–0 | 1–0 | 1994 FIFA World Cup qualification (OFC) |
| 30 | 18 June 1995 | Sydney Football Stadium, Sydney, Australia | Ghana | 2–0 | 2–1 | Friendly |
| 31 | 13 June 1997 | Parramatta Stadium, Australia | Tahiti | 4–0 | 5–0 | 1998 FIFA World Cup qualification |
| 32 | 17 June 1997 | Parramatta Stadium, Australia | Solomon Islands | 2–0 | 6–2 | 1998 FIFA World Cup qualification |
| 33 | 6 July 1997 | Parramatta Stadium, Australia | New Zealand | 2–0 | 2–0 | 1998 FIFA World Cup qualification |

=== Managerial ===
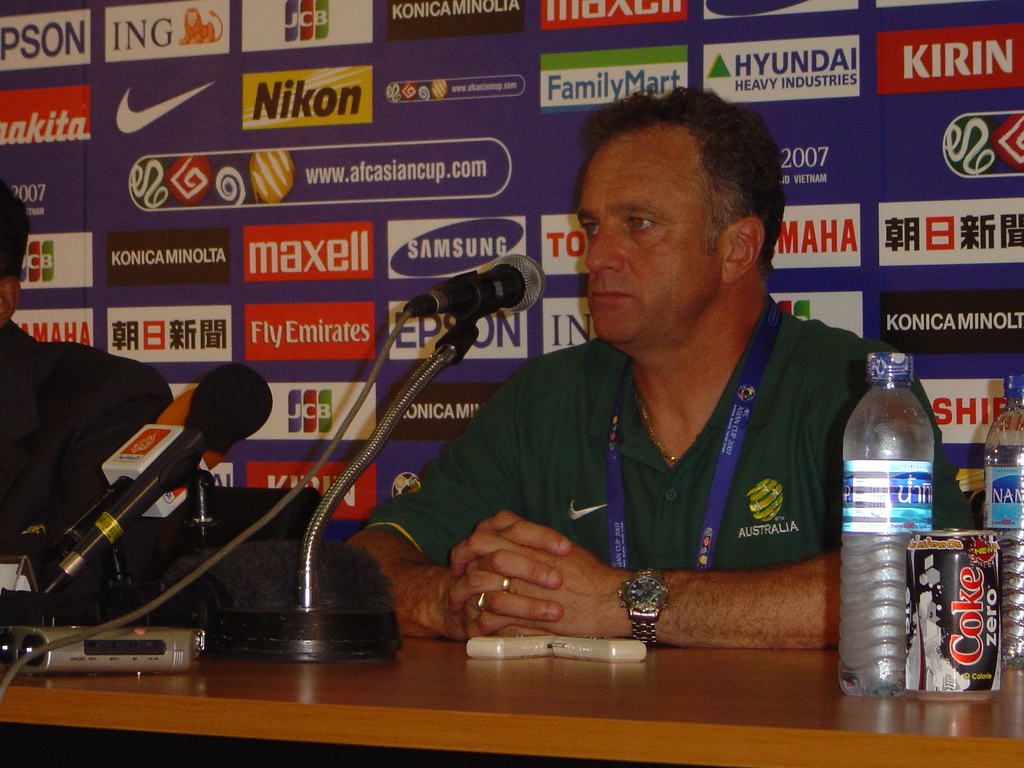
Arnold managing Australia in 2007

As of match played 17 November 2026

Managerial record by team and tenure
| Team | Nat. | From | To | Record | | | | | Ref. |
| Team | Nat. | From | To | G | W | D | L | Win % | Ref. |
|---|---|---|---|---|---|---|---|---|---|
| Australia | (Australia) | 21 July 2006 | 6 December 2007 | 15 | 6 | 4 | 5 | 40.00 | |
| Central Coast Mariners | (Australia) | 1 June 2010 | 14 November 2013 | 114 | 55 | 30 | 29 | 48.25 | |
| Vegalta Sendai | (Japan) | 1 February 2014 | 9 April 2014 | 8 | 0 | 3 | 5 | 0.00 | |
| Sydney FC | (Australia) | 8 May 2014 | 14 July 2018 | 142 | 81 | 34 | 27 | 57.04 | |
| Australia U23 | (Australia) | 16 July 2018 | 28 July 2021 | 9 | 5 | 3 | 1 | 55.56 | |
| Australia | (Australia) | 16 July 2018 | 20 September 2024 | 57 | 37 | 7 | 13 | 64.91 | |
| Iraq | (Iraq) | 9 May 2025 | Present | 24 | 10 | 6 | 8 | 41.67 | |
| Career Total | | | | 368 | 194 | 87 | 87 | 52.72 | |

== Honours ==
=== Player ===
- NSL Cup: 1987

Individual

- NSW Player of the Year: 1985
- National Soccer League Player of the Year: 1986
- National Soccer League Golden Boot: 1986
- Football Australia Hall of Fame: 2004

=== Manager ===
Central Coast Mariners

- A-League Championship: 2013, runners-up: 2010–11
- A-League Premiership: 2011–12

Sydney

- A-League Championship: 2017, runners-up: 2014–15
- A-League Premiership: 2016–17, 2017–18
- FFA Cup Winners: 2017

Australia (Assistant Manager)

- FIFA Confederations Cup Bronze Medal: 2001
- OFC Nations Cup: 2000

Australia U23

- AFC U23 Asian Cup Bronze Medal: 2020

Iraq

- Kings Cup: 2025

Individual

- A-League Coach of the Year: 2011–12, 2016–17, 2017–18
- A-League All Star Team Manager: 2011–12
- PFA Manager of the Season: 2011–12, 2016–17, 2017–18

Record

- Under Arnold, Australia (Socceroos) became first nation in FIFA World Cup qualifying history to win eleven (11) consecutive matches in a single qualification campaign (September 2018 – October 2021)

== Olympic Games Association ==
Graham Arnold has enjoyed a long association with the Olympic Games, having attended four Men's Football Tournament hailing back to Seoul 1988.

- At Seoul 1988, Arnold was a member of Australia's squad under Frank Arok. Australia made the Quarter Finals, with Arnold playing in every match.
- At Athens 2004, Arnold was assistant coach of the 'Olyroos' alongside Frank Farina. Australia made the Quarter Finals after performing strongly in Group C which contained Argentina, Serbia & Montenegro, and Tunisia.
- At Beijing 2008, Arnold was the head coach of the 'Olyroos'. He mentored Australia's U23 men's national football team through a challenging qualification path in Asia, which included an away day in Pyongyang in North Korea where Australia recorded a vital 1–1 draw. At the Olympics proper, the Olyroos competed in Group A alongside Serbia, Ivory Coast, and eventual gold medal winners, Argentina. After drawing 1–1 with Serbia on matchday one, Australia lost late and by the narrowest of margins to a star-studded Argentina and Ivory Coast in its final group games.
- At Tokyo 2020 (held in 2021 due to the COVID-19 pandemic), Arnold was the head coach of the 'Olyroos'. Australia hadn't qualified for the Olympic Games since Beijing 2008 (when Arnold was last in charge), however again Arnold guided Australia's U23 men's national football team through qualification in Asia. At Tokyo 2020 the Olyroos played their group games in Sapporo (two matches) and Miyagi (one match). The Olyroos pulled off one of the shocks of Olympic football history in their first game, defeating Argentina - widely fancied to challenge for gold - 2–0. The Olyroos then narrowly lost to a star-studded Spain side on matchday two, before incurring a 2–0 defeat to Egypt on the third and final matchday. Arnold took charge of the Olyroos while he was mentoring the Socceroos in a bid to build more depth for Australia's senior national teams, and to help players develop their careers. Many of the young players that gained experience throughout the Olyroos' Tokyo 2020 qualification campaign and campaign proper have already graduated to the senior national team, and some, to bigger club stages abroad. These players include Denis Genreau, Nathaniel Atkinson, Joel King, Connor Metcalfe, and Marco Tilio.
