= List of Sydney United 58 FC seasons =

Sydney United 58 Football Club is a semi-professional association football club based in Edensor Park, a suburb of Sydney, New South Wales, Australia. The club was founded in Surry Hills as Sydney Croatia Sports Club in 1958 by Croatian Australians. Sydney Croatia first competed in the third division of the NSW Soccer Football Association in 1959 and earned promotion to the first division in 1962. The club claimed their first state league title in 1977 and won it a further four times in 1978, 1979, 1981 and 1982. Around this time, Croatia played at several grounds, namely Wentworth Park, ES Marks Athletics Field, Sydney Sports Ground and Parramatta Stadium before building Sydney United Sports Centre in 1980, located in Edensor Park.

The club played their first season in the National Soccer League in 1984, after years of being rejected by the association for having a non-nationalistic name. After two Finals series appearances in 1985 and 1986, Sydney Croatia reached their first national final in the 1987 NSL Cup, in which the club won, and first league Grand Final in 1988. The club was renamed to Sydney United in 1993 and would appear in two more Grand Finals in 1997 and 1999, with two premier titles in the 1996–97 and 1998–99 season. This would mark the end of the golden generation for Sydney United, followed by the demise of the NSL in the 2003–04 season. During their time in the NSL, United produced 48 players who went on to play for the Australian national team.

Sydney United played in the National Premier Leagues NSW in the 2004–05 season where they faced a fierce rivalry with Bonnyrigg White Eagles, which resulted in riots between the club's supporters when the two clubs played each other. Despite this, until 2020, Sydney United have claimed two league championships, two league premiers titles, and three Waratah Cup during their time in NPL. The club claimed two Grand Finals of the National Premier Leagues, winning the inaugural final in 2013 and a second final in 2016. In 2022, Sydney United became the first state league club to play in an Australia Cup final after defeating A-League Men clubs Western United and Brisbane Roar. United would lose the final to Macarthur FC and was sanctioned for the match due to fascist behaviour from the club's supporters.

Sydney United 58 set to play Australian Championship from October 2025 after participating in NPL NSW.

== Key ==
Key to league:

- Pos. = Final position
- Pld = Matches played
- W = Matches won
- D = Matches drawn
- L = Matches lost
- GF = Goals for
- GA = Goals against
- Pts = Points

Key to rounds:

- C = Champions
- F = Final (Runners-up)
- PF = Preliminary finals
- SF = Semi-finals
- EF = Elimination finals
- QF = Quarter-finals
- R32/R16 = Round of 32, round of 16, etc.
- R1/R2 = First round, second round, etc.
- GS = Group stage
- DNQ = Did not qualify

Champions	Runners-up

Top scorers shown in italics with number of goals scored in bold are players who were also top scorers in the league that season.

== Seasons ==
=== NSW Federation ===
Season	State Cup	Finals Series	Regional league								
Season	State Cup	Finals Series	Competition	Pos.	Pld	W	D	L	GF	GA	Pts
1959	–	–	Division Three	6th	26	11	7	8	63	51	29
1960	–	–	Division Three	**C**	24	19	4	1	103	26	42
1961	R1	SF	Division Two	4th	21 (Note: The league was scheduled for 22 league games per team. Sydney United had an abandoned match against Sutherland St George and was not replayed.)	13	2	6	59	36	28
1962	R1	F	Division Two	**C**	21 (Note: The league was scheduled for 22 league games per team. Sydney United had an abandoned match against Manly Warringah and was not replayed.)	16	1	4	64	19	33
1963	QF	DNQ	Division One	11th	22	4	4	14	35	60	12
1964	R3	DNQ	Division One	9th	22	6	6	10	36	44	18
1965	R3	DNQ	Division One	7th	18	5	3	10	31	48	13
1966	QF	DNQ	Division One	7th	18	5	5	8	19	41	15
1967	–	GS	Division One	3rd	22	10	7	5	37	26	27
1968	–	DNQ	Division One	5th	22	11	3	8	39	35	25
1969	–	DNQ	Division One	8th	22	7	5	10	33	31	19
1970	–	GS	Division One	4th	22	11	3	8	43	37	25
1971	R4	DNQ	Division One	7th	22	9	3	10	35	38	21
1972	R2	DNQ	Division One	10th	22	4	6	12	24	53	14
1973	–	DNQ	Division One	8th	22	6	7	9	29	37	19
1974	**C**	DNQ	Division One	7th	22	8	4	10	27	33	20
1975	SF	DNQ	Division One	7th	22	10	3	9	24	32	23
1976	F	DNQ	Division One	6th	22	6	8	8	32	33	20
1977	–	**C**	Division One	**C**	22	17	4	1	49	15	38
1978	–	F	Division One	**C**	26	22	0	4	62	13	44
1979	–	PF	State League	**C**	26	16	9	1	54	23	41
1980	–	DNQ	State League	7th	26	8	9	9	41	37	25
1981	–	F	State League	**C**	26	23	3	0	75	18	49
1982	–	**C**	State League	**C**	26	15	8	3	44	10	38
1983	–	**C**	Division One	2nd	24	15	8	1	50	11	38

=== National Soccer League ===
Season	League									Finals series	NSL Cup	Waratah Cup	Top league scorer(s)	
Season	Division	Pld	W	D	L	GF	GA	Pts	Pos.	Finals series	NSL Cup	Waratah Cup	Player(s)	Goals
1984 (Note: Sydney United competed in the Northern Conference of the 1984 National Soccer League)	National Soccer League	28	8	11	9	32	38	27	6th	DNQ	GS	–	Graham Arnold	11
1985 (Note: Sydney United competed in the Northern Conference of the 1985 National Soccer League)	National Soccer League	22	14	5	3	50	22	33	2nd	SF	R1	–	Jim Patikas	16
1986 (Note: Sydney United competed in the Northern Conference of the 1986 National Soccer League)	National Soccer League	22	14	4	4	43	18	32	**1st**	PF	R1	–	Graham Arnold	**17**
1987	National Soccer League	24	10	6	8	31	25	26	5th	ESF	**C**	–	Robbie Slater	9
1988	National Soccer League	26	15	4	7	38	30	34	2nd	F	SF	–	Graham Arnold; Manis Lamond	10
1989	National Soccer League	26	10	8	8	25	25	28	7th	DNQ	R1	–	Graham Arnold	5
1989–90	National Soccer League	26	10	6	10	40	39	26	7th	DNQ	R2	–	David Seal	**15**
1990–91	National Soccer League	26	8	10	8	27	33	26	7th	DNQ	R1	–	Tony Krslovic	13
1991–92	National Soccer League	26	6	9	11	22	33	21	12th	DNQ	R2	–	Tony Krslovic	7
1992–93	National Soccer League	26	12	3	11	36	41	39	7th	DNQ	SF	–	Tony Krslovic	11
1993-94	National Soccer League	26	13	7	6	31	29	46	3rd	EF	F	–	N/A	
1994-95	National Soccer League	24	15	5	4	34	19	68	3rd	SF	R1	QF	David Zdrilic; Manis Lamond	7
1995–96	National Soccer League	33	14	12	7	47	33	54	6th	SF	R1	**C**	David Zdrilic	9
1996–97	National Soccer League	26	17	5	4	67	33	56	**1st**	F	R1	**C**	David Zdrilic	**21**
1997–98	National Soccer League	26	11	10	5	37	26	43	4th	EF	–	QF	Abbas Saad	9
1998–99	National Soccer League	28	18	4	6	53	33	58	**1st**	F	–	–	Mile Sterjovski	**18**
1999-2000	National Soccer League	34	5	5	24	19	58	20	16th	DNQ	–	–	Three players (Note: Nick Bosevski *Aytek Genc *Mario Jermen)	3
2000-01	National Soccer League	30	12	6	12	46	56	42	10th	DNQ	–	–	Commins Menapi	9
2001-02	National Soccer League	26	6	6	12	27	37	24	11th	DNQ	–	–	Commins Menapi; Ante Milicic	8
2002–03	National Soccer League	24	7	6	11	23	31	27	8th	DNQ	–	–	Brendon Santalab	6
2003–04	National Soccer League	24	7	8	9	18	25	29	10th	DNQ	–	–	Brendon Santalab	5

=== National Premier Leagues (NSW) ===
Season	National Cup	State Cup	GF	FS	National Premier Leagues									Top league scorer(s)	
Season	National Cup	State Cup	GF	FS	Competition	Pos.	Pld	W	D	L	GF	GA	Pts	Player(s)	Goals
2004–05	–	**C**	–	EF	Premier League	4th	22	10	7	5	44	30	37	N/A	
2006	–	SF	–	**C**	Premier League	4th	18	9	4	5	33	22	31	N/A	
2007	–	R3	–	DNQ	Premier League	6th	18	6	6	6	25	24	24	Labinot Haliti; Ben Vidaic	7
2008	–	R4	–	QF	Premier League	5th	22	9	7	6	29	21	34	N/A	
2009	–	R4	–	PF	Premier League	**1st**	22	13	7	2	42	22	46	Luka Glavas	12
2010	–	R4	–	EF	Premier League	3rd	22	11	6	5	39	26	39	Elsid Barkhousir	14
2011	–	R4	–	F	Premier League	2nd	22	11	6	5	38	23	39	Luka Glavas	**14**
2012	–	R3	–	DNQ	Premier League	9th	22	7	4	11	27	38	25	Three players (Note: Luka Glavas *Ante Tomic *Mirjan Pavlović)	4
2013	–	R5	**C**	PF	NPL 1	**1st**	22	14	3	5	46	30	45	Luka Glavas	**18**
2014	R16	QF	DNQ	DNQ	NPL 1	9th	22	6	6	10	25	29	24	Mirjan Pavlović	6
2015	R16	**C**	DNQ	DNQ	NPL 1	7th	22	9	1	12	38	45	28	Panny Nikas	8
2016	R32	**C**	**C**	F	NPL 1	**1st**	22	17	3	2	58	21	54	Chris Payne	**22**
2017	R16	SF	DNQ	DNQ	NPL 1	7th	22	10	4	8	42	27	34	Panny Nikas	12
2018	DNQ	R6	DNQ	PF	NPL 1	3rd	22	12	2	8	36	29	38	Chris Payne	11
2019	R16	F	DNQ	F	NPL 1	4th	22	9	6	7	31	32	33	Peter Simonoski	10
2020 (Note: Due to the COVID-19 pandemic, the league was suspended and re-commenced in July on a revised format, involving a single round-robin of eleven matches and a two-weeks finals series.)	–	–	–	**C**	NPL 1	3rd	11	7	1	3	26	20	22	Patrick Antelmi	10
2021 (Note: Due to the COVID-19 pandemic, the league and finals series were cancelled with no titles awarded.)	DNQ	–	–	N/A	NPL 1	2nd	17	9	5	3	31	17	32	Patrick Antelmi	14
2022	F	F	–	DNQ	NPL 1	8th	22	8	5	9	32	42	29	Chris Payne	9
2023	R16	**C**	–	DNQ	NPL 1	10th	30	11	6	13	42	48	39	Patrick Antelmi	14
2024	DNQ	R7	–	PF	NPL 1	6th	30	15	5	10	45	40	50	Shunta Nakamura	10
2025	R16	**C**	–	EF	NPL 1	6th	30	14	7	9	41	39	49	Mason Wells	10

=== Australian Championship (AC) ===
Season	Australian Championship									Top league scorer(s)	
Season	Competition	Pos	Pld	W	D	L	GF	GA	Pts	Player(s)	Goals
2025	AC										
