= 1994–95 Sydney United FC season =

Sydney United 58 FC
1994–1995 season
- Chairman: Ivan Simić
- Manager: Branko Culina
- Stadium: Sydney Croatian Sports Centre
- National Soccer League: 3rd (League); Minor Semi-Final (Finals)
- Johnny Walker Cup: First Round
- Top goalscorer: League: David Zdrilic, Manis Lamond (7); All: Manis Lamond (8)
- Highest home attendance: 8,810 vs. West Adelaide Sharks (23 April 1995); National Soccer League
- Lowest home attendance: 1,097 vs. Brisbane Strikers (3 October 1994); Johnny Walker Cup
- Average home league attendance: 4,445
- Biggest win: 3–0 vs. Marconi Fairfield (13 November 1994); National Soccer League; 3-0 vs. Heidelberg United (4 January 1995); National Soccer League
- Biggest defeat: 1-4 vs. Melbourne Knights (20 November 1994); National Soccer League; 0-3 vs. Adelaide City (22 January 1995); National Soccer League

The 1994-95 season saw Sydney United embark on its twelfth season in the NSL. Under the guidance of new coach Branko Culina, the team finished third in the league, narrowly missing out on the top spot by just two points behind the premiers and eventual champions, Melbourne Knights.

In the final series, Sydney United defeated West Adelaide Sharks 2–1 over two legs in the Elimination Semi-Final. However, their campaign was ultimately cut short when they were eliminated by South Melbourne in the Minor Semi-Final 3-1. The team's performance in the Johnny Walker Cup was less successful, with an early exit in the first round at the hands of Brisbane Strikers 3–2 over two legs.

Sydney United's Youth team had a phenomenal year. They won the Northern Division Grand Final, defeating the AIS 2-1, and then went on to claim the National Youth League Championship with a 1–0 victory over Melbourne Knights.

== Players ==
Note: Flags indicate national team as defined under FIFA eligibility rules; some limited exceptions apply. Players may hold more than one non-FIFA nationality.

No.	Pos.	Nation	Player
1	GK	AUS	Zeljko Kalac
2	DF	AUS	Robert Stanton
3	DF	CRO	Velimir Kuprešak
4	DF	AUS	Tony Popovic (Captain)
5	DF	AUS	Mark Babic
6	MF	MKD	Ljupčo Naumovski
7	MF	CRO	Ivan Petković
8	MF	AUS	Ante Moric
9	FW	AUS	Tony Krslovic
10	FW	AUS	Ante Milicic
11	MF	AUS	Eric Hristodoulou
12	DF	AUS	Marko Rudan

No.	Pos.	Nation	Player
13	FW	AUS	Mario Jermen
14	FW	AUS	David Zdrilic
15	FW	AUS	Zeljko Babic
16	FW	PNG	Manis Lamond
17	DF	AUS	Paul Bilokapic
18	MF	AUS	Richard Plesa
19	DF	AUS	Joe Vrkic
20	MF	AUS	Dominic Ušalj
21	DF	AUS	Chad Gibson
22	GK	AUS	John Perosh
23	MF	AUS	Lou Trajčevski

=== Transfers in ===
No.	Pos.	Nat.	Name	Age	Moving from	Type	Transfer window	Ends	Transfer fee	Source
6	MF	(North Macedonia)	Ljupčo Naumovski	28	Parramatta Eagles (Australia)	Transfer	Pre-season		Free	
20	MF	(Australia)	Dominic Ušalj	20	Leichhardt Tigers (Australia)	Transfer	Pre-season		Free	

=== Transfers out ===
No.	Pos.	Nat.	Name	Age	Moving to	Type	Transfer window	Transfer fee	Source
20	GK	(Australia)	Tony Franken	29	Parramatta Eagles (Australia)	End of Contract	Pre-season	Free	
13	DF	(Australia)	Klaus Okon	33	Marconi Fairfield (Australia)	End of Contract	Pre-season	Free	
10	MF	(Australia)	John Gibson	24	Adelaide City (Australia)	End of Contract	Pre-season	Free	
19	MF	(Australia)	Mirko Jurilj	20	Pkenj FC (Malaysia)	End of Contract	Pre-season	Free	
6	MF	(Australia)	Tomislav Miličević	22	Free agent	End of Contract	Pre-season	Free	

== Competitions ==
=== Overview ===
Competition	First match	Last match	Starting round	Final position	Record							
Competition	First match	Last match	Starting round	Final position	Pld	W	D	L	GF	GA	GD	Win %
National Soccer League	30 October 1994	27 March 1995	Matchday 2	3rd	24	15	5	4	34	19	+15	62.50
Final Series	17 April 1995	26 April 1995	Elimination Final	Minor Semi-Final	3	1	1	1	3	4	−1	33.33
Johnny Walker Cup	30 September 1994	3 October 1994	First round	First Round	2	1	0	1	2	3	−1	50.00
Waratah Cup	11 September 1994	11 September 1994	Quarter Final	Quarter Final	1	0	0	1	0	1	−1	0.00
Total					30	17	6	7	39	27	+12	56.67

Last updated: complete
Source: Competitions

=== National Soccer League ===
==== League table ====
Pos	Team	Pld	W	PW	PL	L	GF	GA	GD	Pts	Qualification
1	Melbourne Knights (C)	24	16	2	2	4	56	25	+31	70	Qualification for the Finals series
2	Adelaide City	24	16	1	3	4	41	20	+21	69	Qualification for the Finals series
3	Sydney United	24	15	3	2	4	34	19	+15	68	Qualification for the Finals series
4	Morwell Falcons	24	8	4	7	5	41	37	+4	47	Qualification for the Finals series
5	West Adelaide	24	8	5	3	8	28	32	−4	45	Qualification for the Finals series
6	South Melbourne	24	9	3	2	10	42	36	+6	44	Qualification for the Finals series
7	Brisbane Strikers	24	8	3	3	10	34	32	+2	41	
8	Wollongong City	24	8	2	2	12	39	46	−7	38	
9	Sydney Olympic	24	8	1	3	12	27	34	−7	37	
10	Marconi Fairfield	24	6	4	3	11	34	43	−9	35	
11	Melbourne SC	24	6	4	2	12	20	37	−17	34	
12	Parramatta Eagles	24	7	2	1	14	25	34	−9	33	
13	Heidelberg United	24	6	1	2	15	27	53	−26	28	

Updated to match(es) played on unknown. Source: rsssf.com
Rules for classification: 1) points; 2) goal difference; 3) number of goals scored.
(C) Champion

==== Results summary ====
Overall									Home							Away						
Pld	W	SOW	SOL	L	GF	GA	GD	Pts	W	SOW	SOL	L	GF	GA	GD	W	SOW	SOL	L	GF	GA	GD
24	15	3	2	4	34	19	+15	53	7	2	2	1	17	7	+10	8	1	0	3	17	12	+5

Source: worldfootball.net

==== Matches ====
1	Sydney United	Bye
		Report

30 October 1994 2	Sydney United	0-0 (5-6 pens)	Adelaide City	Edensor Park, New South Wales
		Report		Stadium: Sydney Croatian Sports Centre; Attendance: 5,228; Referee: Richard Lorenc

6 November 1994 3	Sydney Olympic	0-2	Sydney United	Lilyfield, New South Wales
		Report	Zdrilic 52', 71'	Stadium: Leichhardt Oval; Attendance: 4,240; Referee: Eugene Brazzale

13 November 1994 4	Sydney United	3-0	Marconi Fairfield	Edensor Park, New South Wales
	van Egmond (og) 24'; Milicic 25'; Zdrilic 70'	Report		Stadium: Sydney Croatian Sports Centre; Attendance: 5,861; Referee: Con Diomis

20 November 1994 5	Melbourne Knights	4-1	Sydney United	Sunshine North, Victoria
	Marth 13'; Spiteri 27'; Buljubasic 45'; Lapsanky 64'	Report	Moric 68'	Stadium: Melbourne Croatian Sports Centre; Attendance: 7,525; Referee: Gerry Connolly

27 November 1994 6	Sydney United	0-0 (3-1 on pens)	Brisbane Strikers	Edensor Park, New South Wales
		Report		Stadium: Sydney Croatian Sports Centre; Attendance: 2,430; Referee: N.Jones

2 December 1994 7	Wollongong City	1-1 (1-3 pens)	Sydney United	Fairy Meadow, New South Wales
	O'Shea 33pen'	Report	Zdrilic 40'	Stadium: Brandon Park; Attendance: 3,692; Referee: Richard Lorenc

9 December 1994 8	Sydney United	0-1	West Adelaide Sharks	Edensor Park, New South Wales
		Report	Iriarte 44'	Stadium: Sydney Croatian Sports Centre; Attendance: 1,323; Referee: Shaun Micaleff

18 December 1994 9	Parramatta Eagles	0-1	Sydney United	Granville, New South Wales
		Report	Bilokapic 44'	Stadium: Melita Stadium; Attendance: 4,764; Referee: John Fraser

27 December 1994 10	Sydney United	2-1	South Melbourne	Edensor Park, New South Wales
	Rudan 39'; Hristodoulou 80'	Report	Trimboli 39'	Stadium: Sydney Croatian Sports Centre; Attendance: 3,250; Referee: Brett Hugo

2 January 1995 11	Sydney United	2-0	Melbourne SC	Edensor Park, New South Wales
	Zdrilic 40'; Z.Babic 91'	Report		Stadium: Sydney Croatian Sports Centre; Attendance: 2,233; Referee: Con Diomis

4 January 1994 12	Heidelberg United	0-3	Sydney United	Melbourne, Victoria
		Report	Lamond 12', 60'; Z.Babic 82'	Stadium: Olympic Park; Attendance: 6,572; Referee: Gerry Connolly

13 January 1995 13	Sydney United	1-1 (5-3 pens)	Morwell Falcons	Edensor Park, New South Wales
	Rudan 60'	Report	Bothwell 42'	Stadium: Sydney Croatian Sports Centre; Attendance: 3,487; Referee: John Papanicolas

22 January 1995 14	Adelaide City	3-0	Sydney United	Hindmarsh, South Australia
	Mori 4'; Lozanovski 22'; Melta 80'	Report		Stadium: Hindmarsh Stadium; Attendance: 3,906; Referee: John Fraser

15	Sydney United	Bye
		Report

29 January 1995 16	Sydney United	1-0	Sydney Olympic	Edensor Park, New South Wales
	Popovic 20'	Report		Stadium: Sydney Croatian Sports Centre; Attendance: 5,089; Referee: Bill Hugo

5 February 1995 17	Marconi Fairfield	0-1	Sydney United	Bossley Park, New South Wales
		Report	Milicic * 71'	Stadium: Marconi Stadium; Attendance: 5,425; Referee: Shaun Micaleff

12 February 1995 18	Sydney United	2-2 (5-6 pens)	Melbourne Knights	Edensor Park, New South Wales
	Milicic * 2'; Lamond * 66'	Report	Horvat * 16'; Viduka * 54'	Stadium: Sydney Croatian Sports Centre; Attendance: 3,985; Referee: John Fraser

18 February 1995 19	Sydney United	2-1	Brisbane Strikers	Edensor Park, New South Wales
	Lamond ?', ?'	Report	Slater ?'	Stadium: Sydney Croatian Sports Centre; Attendance: 2,430

26 February 1995 20	Sydney United	2-1	Wollongong City	Edensor Park, New South Wales
	Popovic 43'; Lamond 81'	Report	Cervinski 48'	Stadium: Sydney Croatian Sports Centre; Attendance: 4,110; Referee: Bill Hugo

5 March 1995 21	West Adelaide Sharks	0-2	Sydney United	Hindmarsh, South Australia
		Report	Popovic 21'; Stanton 29'	Stadium: Hindmarsh Stadium; Attendance: 3,111; Referee: M.Ingham

12 March 1995 22	Sydney United	1-0	Parramatta Eagles	Edensor Park, New South Wales
	Kupresak 64'	Report		Stadium: Sydney Croatian Sports Centre; Attendance: 4,624; Referee: Shaun Micaleff

17 March 1995 23	South Melbourne	0-1	Sydney United	Melbourne, Victoria
		Report	Lamond 42'	Stadium: Olympic Park; Attendance: 2,802; Referee: Eugene Brazzale

24 March 1995 24	Melbourne SC	0-1	Sydney United	Melbourne, Victoria
		Report	Hristodoulou 26'	Stadium: Olympic Park; Attendance: 2,131; Referee: Gerry Connelly

2 April 1995 25	Sydney United	3-1	Heidelberg United	Edensor Park, New South Wales
	Zdrilic 3'; Hristodoulou 49'; Milicic 75'	Report	Tsolakis 80'	Stadium: Sydney Croatian Sports Centre; Attendance: 5,910; Referee: Con Diomis

9 April 1995 26	Morwell Falcons	3-2	Sydney United	Morwell, Victoria
	Markovski 44'; Canosa 83'; Waddell 85'	Report	Milicic 20'; Zdrilic 88'	Stadium: Falcons Park; Attendance: 3,286; Referee: Gerry Connelly

16 April 1995 Elimination Final - 1st Leg	West Adelaide Sharks	1-1	Sydney United	Hindmarsh, South Australia
	Hooker 44'	Report	Jermen 90'	Stadium: Hindmarsh Stadium; Attendance: 3,397

23 April 1995 Elimination Final - 2nd Leg	Sydney United	1-0	West Adelaide Sharks	Edensor Park, New South Wales
	Jermen 78'	Report		Stadium: Sydney United Sports Centre; Attendance: 8,810

26 April 1995 Minor Semi-Final	Sydney United	1-3	South Melbourne	Bossley Park, New South Wales
	Jermen ?'	Report	Muscat ?', ?'; Kelic ?'	Stadium: Marconi Stadium; Attendance: 6,072

=== Johnny Walker Cup ===
30 September 1994 First round 1st Leg	Brisbane Strikers	2-0	Sydney United	Bowen Hills, Queensland
	Brown 50', 78'	Report		Stadium: Perry Park; Attendance: 1,092; Referee: Doug Prentice

3 October 1994 First round 2nd Leg	Sydney United	2-1	Brisbane Strikers	Edensor Park, New South Wales
	Lamond 45'; Naumovski 90'	Report	Phillips 89'	Stadium: Sydney Croatian Sports Centre; Attendance: 1,097; Referee: Neil Jones

=== Waratah Cup ===
11 September 1994 Quarter-Finals	Wollongong City	1-0	Sydney United	Fairy Meadow, New South Wales
		Report		Stadium: Brandon Park

== Statistics ==
=== Appearances and goals ===
Players with no appearances not included in the list.

No.	Pos.	Nat.	Name	National Soccer League		NSL Final Series		Johhny Walker Cup		Total	
No.	Pos.	Nat.	Name	Apps	Goals	Apps	Goals	Apps	Goals	Apps	Goals
1	GK	(Australia)	Zeljko Kalac	24	0	3	0	2	0	29	0
2	DF	(Australia)	Robert Stanton	24	1	3	0	2	0	29	1
3	DF	(Croatia)	Velimir Kuprešak	24	1	3	0	0	0	27	1
4	DF	(Australia)	Tony Popovic	22	3	3	0	1	0	26	3
5	DF	(Australia)	Mark Babic	22	0	0	0	2	0	24	0
6	MF	(North Macedonia)	Ljupčo Naumovski	22	0	2	0	2	1	26	1
7	MF	(Croatia)	Ivan Petković	15	0	2	0	0	0	17	0
8	MF	(Australia)	Ante Moric	19	1	3	0	2	0	24	1
9	FW	(Australia)	Tony Krslovic	0	0	0	0	2	0	2	0
10	FW	(Australia)	Ante Milicic	22	5	3	1	2	0	27	6
11	MF	(Australia)	Eric Hristodoulou	24	3	3	0	2	0	29	3
12	DF	(Australia)	Marko Rudan	7	2	0	0	0	0	7	2
13	FW	(Australia)	Mario Jermen	7	0	3	2	2	0	12	2
14	FW	(Australia)	David Zdrilic	20	7	3	0	2	0	25	7
15	FW	(Australia)	Zeljko Babic	13	2	3	0	2	0	18	2
16	FW	(Papua New Guinea)	Manis Lamond	18	7	3	0	2	1	23	8
17	DF	(Australia)	Paul Bilokapic	15	1	0	0	0	0	15	1
18	MF	(Australia)	Richard Plesa	1	0	0	0	0	0	1	0
19	DF	(Australia)	Joe Vrkic	4	0	0	0	0	0	4	0
20	MF	(Australia)	Dominic Ušalj	4	0	0	0	0	0	4	0
