= 1993–94 Sydney United FC season =

Sydney United 58 FC
1993–1994 season
- Chairman: Ivan Simić
- Manager: Manfred Schaefer
- Stadium: Sydney Croatian Sports Centre
- National Soccer League: 3rd (League); Elimination Final (Finals)
- 1993–94 NSL Cup: Runners Up
- Top goalscorer: Ante Milicic, Manis Lamond (7)
- Highest home attendance: 6,010 vs. Marconi Fairfield (7 November 1993); National Soccer League
- Lowest home attendance: 1,406 vs. Melbourne Knights (6 October 1993); NSL Cup
- Average home league attendance: 3,815
- Biggest win: 3–0 vs. Heidelberg United (23 January 1994); National Soccer League
- Biggest defeat: 1-6 vs. Melbourne Knights (2 February 1994); National Soccer League

The 1993-94 season saw Sydney United embark on its eleventh season in the NSL. It was a pivotal moment for the club, as it adopted the name Sydney United, a moniker that has endured to this day, following a brief stint as Sydney CSC.

With Manfred Schaefer back at the helm, the team achieved a notable third-place finish in the league, securing a spot in the final series for the first time in six years. Although their playoff run was ultimately halted by Adelaide City in the Elimination Final. The team also made a strong showing in the NSL Cup, advancing to the final before falling to Parramatta Eagles 2-0.

== Players ==
Note: Flags indicate national team as defined under FIFA eligibility rules; some limited exceptions apply. Players may hold more than one non-FIFA nationality.

No.	Pos.	Nation	Player
1	GK	AUS	Zeljko Kalac
2	DF	AUS	Robert Stanton
3	DF	AUS	Velimir Kuprešak
4	MF	AUS	Tony Popovic (Captain)
5	DF	AUS	Mark Babic
6	MF	AUS	Tomislav Miličević
7	MF	CRO	Ivan Petković
8	FW	AUS	Tony Krslovic
9	MF	AUS	Eric Hristodoulou
10	FW	AUS	John Gibson
11	FW	AUS	David Zdrilic
12	MF	AUS	Ante Moric

No.	Pos.	Nation	Player
13	DF	AUS	Klaus Okon
14	DF	AUS	Joe Vrkic
15	MF	AUS	Ante Milicic
16	FW	PNG	Manis Lamond
17	MF	AUS	Richard Plesa
18	DF	AUS	Marko Rudan
19	FW	AUS	Zeljko Babic
20	GK	AUS	Tony Franken
—	FW	AUS	Mario Jermen
—	MF	AUS	Mirko Jurilj
—	FW	AUS	Matthew Zec
—	DF	AUS	Ante Žižić

=== Transfers in ===
No.	Pos.	Nat.	Name	Age	Moving from	Type	Transfer window	Ends	Transfer fee	Source
13	MF	(Australia)	Klaus Okon	31	Parramatta Eagles (Australia)	Transfer	Pre-season		Free	
11	FW	(Australia)	David Zdrilic	22	St George FC (Australia)	Transfer	Pre-season		Free	

=== Transfers out ===
No.	Pos.	Nat.	Name	Age	Moving to	Type	Transfer window	Transfer fee	Source
	DF	(Croatia)	Ante Rumora	33	Retirement		Pre-season		
	FW	(Australia)	Joe Caleta	27	Sydney Olympic (Australia)	End of Contract	Pre-season	Free	
	FW	(Australia)	Gabriel Gonzalez	20	Wollongong United (Australia)	End of Contract	Pre-season	Free	

=== Mid-Season Losses ===
No.	Pos.	Nat.	Name	Age	Moving to	Type	Transfer window	Transfer fee	Source
17	DF	(Australia)	Ante Žižić	20	Wollongong City (Australia)	Transfer	Mid-season	Free	

== Competitions ==
=== Overview ===
Competition	First match	Last match	Starting round	Final position	Record							
Competition	First match	Last match	Starting round	Final position	Pld	W	D	L	GF	GA	GD	Win %
National Soccer League	7 October 1993	27 March 1994	Matchday 1	3rd	26	13	7	6	27	29	−2	50.00
NSL Final Series	10 April 1994	17 April 1994	Elimination Final	Elimination Final	2	1	0	1	1	2	−1	50.00
NSL Cup	3 October 1993	17 October 1993	First round	Final	5	2	2	1	5	5	+0	40.00
Total					33	16	9	8	33	36	−3	48.48

Last updated: complete
Source: Competitions

=== National Soccer League ===
==== League table ====
Pos	Team	Pld	W	D	L	GF	GA	GD	Pts	Qualification
1	Melbourne Knights	26	16	5	5	59	24	+35	53	Qualification for the Finals series
2	South Melbourne	26	13	8	5	39	20	+19	47	Qualification for the Finals series
3	Sydney United	26	13	7	6	31	29	+2	46	Qualification for the Finals series
4	Marconi Fairfield	26	11	9	6	52	33	+19	42	Qualification for the Finals series
5	Adelaide City (C)	26	11	8	7	48	27	+21	41	Qualification for the Finals series
6	Sydney Olympic	26	11	8	7	40	37	+3	41	Qualification for the Finals series
7	Morwell Falcons	26	11	7	8	31	30	+1	40	
8	Brisbane Strikers	26	10	6	10	28	25	+3	36	
9	West Adelaide	26	10	5	11	41	34	+7	35	
10	Parramatta Eagles	26	8	9	9	27	29	−2	33	
11	Wollongong City	26	6	9	11	24	32	−8	27	
12	Newcastle Breakers	26	5	8	13	30	47	−17	23	
13	Brunswick Pumas	26	5	4	17	22	57	−35	19	
14	Heidelberg United	26	3	5	18	19	67	−48	14	

Updated to match(es) played on unknown. Source: rsssf.com
Rules for classification: 1) points; 2) goal difference; 3) number of goals scored.
(C) Champions

==== Matches ====
7 October 1993 1	Sydney United	1-0	South Melbourne	Edensor Park, New South Wales
	Gibson ?'	Report		Stadium: Sydney Croatian Sports Centre; Attendance: 2,898

14 October 1993 2	Marconi Fairfield	2-3	Sydney United	Bossley Park, New South Wales
	Gray ?'; Harper ?'	Report	Milicic ?', ?'; Lamond ?'	Stadium: Marconi Stadium; Attendance: 3,558

21 October 1993 3	Sydney United	2-0	Heidelberg United	Edensor Park, New South Wales
	Lamond ?'; Milicic ?'	Report		Stadium: Sydney Croatian Sports Centre; Attendance: 2,714

25 October 1993 4	Brunswick Pumas	1–1	Sydney United	Footscray, Victoria
	Becvinovski ?'	Report	Jermen ?'	Stadium: Western Oval; Attendance: 1,285

1 November 1993 5	Sydney United	0-3	Melbourne Knights	Edensor Park, New South Wales
		Report	Biskic ?'; O. Pondeljak ?', ?'	Stadium: Sydney Croatian Sports Centre; Attendance: 3,082

8 November 1993 6	Newcastle Breakers	3-1	Sydney United	Newcastle, New South Wales
	Spink ?'; Brown ?', ?'	Report	Lamond ?'	Stadium: Breakers Stadium; Attendance: 2,338

15 November 1993 7	Brisbane Strikers	0-1	Sydney United	Bowen Hills, Queensland
		Report	Lamond ?'	Stadium: Perry Park; Attendance: 2,725

22 November 1993 8	Morwell Falcons	1-1	Sydney United	Morwell, Victoria
	Cassar ?'	Report	Krslovic ?'	Stadium: Falcons Park; Attendance: 2,246

29 November 1993 9	Sydney United	2-1	Sydney Olympic	Edensor Park, New South Wales
	Lamond ?'; Zdrilic ?'	Report	Caleta ?'	Stadium: Sydney Croatian Sports Centre; Attendance: 5,911

6 December 1993 10	Parramatta Eagles	0-0	Sydney United	Granville, New South Wales
		Report		Stadium: Melita Stadium; Attendance: 4,386

13 December 1993 11	Sydney United	2-0	Wollongong City	Edensor Park, New South Wales
	Kupresak ?'; Krslovic ?'	Report		Stadium: Sydney Croatian Sports Centre; Attendance: 3,074

29 December 1993 12	Adelaide City	0-1	Sydney United	Hindmarsh, South Australia
7:30pm		Report	Milicevic ?'	Stadium: Hindmarsh Stadium; Attendance: 4,674

3 January 1994 13	Sydney United	0-3	West Adelaide Sharks	Edensor Park, New South Wales
6:30pm		Report	Brown ?', ?', ?'	Stadium: Sydney Croatian Sports Centre; Attendance: 3,482

9 January 1994 14	Sydney United	2-0	Marconi Fairfield	Edensor Park, New South Wales
6:30pm	Popovic ?'; Gibson ?'	Report		Stadium: Sydney Croatian Sports Centre; Attendance: 6,010

16 January 1994 15	South Melbourne	2-1	Sydney United	Melbourne, Victoria
6pm	Trimboli ?'; Goutzioulis ?'	Report	Okon ?'	Stadium: Middle Park; Attendance: 4,236

23 January 1994 16	Heidelberg United	0-3	Sydney United	Heidelberg West, Victoria
6pm		Report	Popovic ?'; Lamond ?'; Milicic ?'	Stadium: Olympic Village; Attendance: 1,521

26 January 1994 17	Sydney United	2-1	Brunswick Pumas	Edensor Park, New South Wales
6:30pm	Krslovic ?'; Jermen ?'	Report	Karkaletsas ?'	Stadium: Sydney Croatian Sports Centre; Attendance: 3,024

2 February 1994 18	Melbourne Knights	6-1	Sydney United	Sunshine North, Victoria
	Marth ?'; A.Cervinski ?' (?); O.Pondeljak ?'; Viduka ?' (?)	Report	Krslovic ?'	Stadium: Croatian Sports Centre; Attendance: 3,615

9 February 1994 19	Sydney United	1-0	Newcastle Breakers	Edensor Park, New South Wales
6:30pm	Gibson ?'	Report		Stadium: Sydney Croatian Sports Centre; Attendance: 3,239

16 February 1994 20	Sydney United	1-0	Brisbane Strikers	Edensor Park, New South Wales
	Milicic ?'	Report		Stadium: Sydney Croatian Sports Centre; Attendance: 3,327

20 February 1994 21	Sydney United	1-1	Morwell Falcons	Edensor Park, New South Wales
6:30pm	Milicic ?'	Report	Markovski ?'	Stadium: Sydney Croatian Sports Centre; Attendance: 3,607

27 February 1994 22	Sydney Olympic	0-0	Sydney United	Banksia, New South Wales
6:30pm		Report		Stadium: St George Stadium; Attendance: 5,294

6 March 1994 23	Sydney United	1-1	Parramatta Eagles	Edensor Park, New South Wales
6:30pm	Krslovic ?'	Report	Gomez ?'	Stadium: Sydney Croatian Sports Centre; Attendance: 5,130

10 March 1994 24	Wollongong City	0-0	Sydney United	Fairy Meadow, New South Wales
7:30pm		Report		Stadium: Brandon Park; Attendance: 2,164

20 March 1994 25	Sydney United	3-1	Adelaide City	Edensor Park, New South Wales
6:30pm	Gibson ?'; Lamond ?'; Milicic ?'	Report	Tobin ?'	Stadium: Sydney Croatian Sports Centre; Attendance: 4,105

27 March 1994 26	West Adelaide Sharks	3-0	Sydney United	Hindmarsh, South Australia
3pm	Blair ?'; Brown ?' (?)	Report		Stadium: Hindmarsh Stadium; Attendance: 2,484

10 April 1994 Elimination Final - 1st Leg	Adelaide City	0-1	Sydney United	Hindmarsh, South Australia
		Report	Moric 56'	Stadium: Hindmarsh Stadium; Attendance: 5,398; Referee: Eugene Brazzale

17 April 1994 Elimination Final - 2nd Leg	Sydney United	0-2	Adelaide City	Bossley Park, New South Wales
		Report	Hassell 55'; Mori 78'	Stadium: Marconi Stadium; Attendance: 5,607; Referee: John Fraser

=== NSL Cup ===
3 October 1993 First round 1st Leg	Melbourne Knights	2-2	Sydney United	Sunshine North, Victoria
	Viduka 21'; De Amicis 80'	Report	Gibson 40'; Moric 47'	Stadium: Croatian Sports Centre; Attendance: 1,713; Referee: Cain Naumcevski

6 October 1993 First round 2nd Leg	Sydney United	0-0	Melbourne Knights	Edensor Park, New South Wales
		Report		Stadium: Sydney Croatian Sports Centre; Attendance: 1,406; Referee: Gordon Dunster

10 October 1993 Quarter Final	Adelaide City	0-2	Sydney United	Hindmarsh, South Australia
		Report	Jermen 24'; Babic 65'	Stadium: Hindmarsh Stadium; Attendance: 3,879; Referee: John Santa Isabel

13 October 1993 Semi Final	South Melbourne	1-1 (4-5 pens)	Sydney United	Melbourne, Victoria
	Goutzioulis 73'	Report	Krslovic 51'	Stadium: Middle Park; Attendance: 2,474; Referee: Richard Lorenc

17 October 1993 Final	Parramatta Eagles	2-0	Sydney United	Bossley Park, New South Wales
	Kupresak (og) 42'; Renaud 85'	Report		Stadium: Marconi Stadium; Attendance: 4,156; Referee: Eugene Brazzale

== Statistics ==
=== Appearances and goals ===
Players with no appearances not included in the list.

No.	Pos.	Nat.	Name	National Soccer League		NSL Cup		Total	
No.	Pos.	Nat.	Name	Apps	Goals	Apps	Goals	Apps	Goals
—	DF	(Australia)	Mark Babic	15	0	5	1	20	1
—	FW	(Australia)	Zeljko Babic	1	0	0	0	1	0
—	GK	(Australia)	Tony Franken	1	0	1	0	2	0
—	FW	(Australia)	John Gibson	27	4	5	1	32	5
—	MF	(Australia)	Eric Hristodoulou	23	0	3	0	26	0
—	FW	(Australia)	Mario Jermen	9	2	5	1	14	3
—	GK	(Australia)	Zeljko Kalac	27	0	4	0	31	0
—	FW	(Australia)	Tony Krslovic	26	5	3	1	29	6
—	DF	(Australia)	Velimir Kuprešak	25	1	5	0	30	1
—	FW	(Papua New Guinea)	Manis Lamond	23	7	0	0	23	7
—	MF	(Australia)	Tomislav Miličević	13	1	5	0	18	1
—	FW	(Australia)	Ante Milicic	24	7	5	0	29	7
—	MF	(Australia)	Ante Moric	24	1	5	1	29	2
—	MF	(Australia)	Klaus Okon	12	1	1	0	13	1
—	MF	(Croatia)	Ivan Petković	21	1	4	0	25	1
—	MF	(Australia)	Tony Popovic	27	2	4	0	31	2
—	MF	(Australia)	Richard Plesa	2	0	0	0	2	0
—	DF	(Australia)	Marko Rudan	1	0	0	0	1	0
—	DF	(Australia)	Robert Stanton	28	0	5	0	33	0
—	DF	(Australia)	Joe Vrkic	3	0	0	0	3	0
—	FW	(Australia)	David Zdrilic	26	1	2	0	28	1
Players who left during the season
—	DF	(Australia)	Ante Žižić	0	0	1	0	1	0
