= 1992–93 Sydney CSC season =

Sydney CSC
1992–1993 season
- Chairman: Ivan Simić
- Manager: Manfred Schaefer
- Stadium: Sydney Croatian Sports Centre
- National Soccer League: 7th
- 1992–93 NSL Cup: Semi-Finals
- Top goalscorer: Tony Krslovic (11)
- Highest home attendance: 4,275 vs. Parramatta Eagles (7 November 1992); National Soccer League
- Lowest home attendance: 1,151 vs. Marconi Fairfield (13 January 1993); NSL Cup
- Average home league attendance: 2,610
- Biggest win: 3–0 vs. Brisbane United (7 December 1992); National Soccer League; 3-0 vs. Morwell Falcons (2 January 1993); National Soccer League
- Biggest defeat: 0-5 vs. Sydney Olympic (7 March 1993); National Soccer League

The 1992–93 season saw Sydney CSC embark on its tenth campaign in the NSL. They finished 7th out of 14 teams, missing out on the finals series on goal difference.

The 1992–93 season marked the sole instance in which the club operated under the name 'Sydney CSC', as they subsequently adopted their current moniker, 'Sydney United', from the 1993–94 season onwards.

Prior to the commencement of the season, Sydney CSC had appointed former Sydney Olympic Championship-winning coach Mick Hickman as their head coach, with John Kosmina slated to serve as his assistant. However, a disagreement between Hickman and the club's board regarding player transfers led to the departure of both Hickman and Kosmina before the season's start. Following this development, former Socceroo Manfred Schaefer was appointed as Hickman's replacement.

Tony Krslovic topped Sydney CSC's goalscoring charts with 11 goals.

== Players ==
Note: Flags indicate national team as defined under FIFA eligibility rules; some limited exceptions apply. Players may hold more than one non-FIFA nationality.

No.	Pos.	Nation	Player
—	DF	AUS	Mark Babic
—	FW	AUS	Joe Caleta
—	GK	AUS	Tony Franken
—	FW	AUS	John Gibson
—	MF	AUS	Eric Hristodoulou
—	FW	AUS	Mario Jermen
—	MF	AUS	Mirko Jurilj
—	GK	AUS	Zeljko Kalac
—	FW	AUS	Tony Krslovic (Captain)
—	DF	CRO	Velimir Kuprešak
—	FW	PNG	Manis Lamond

No.	Pos.	Nation	Player
—	MF	AUS	Tomislav Miličević
—	MF	AUS	Ante Milicic
—	MF	AUS	Ante Moric
—	GK	AUS	John Perosh (Youth)
—	MF	CRO	Ivan Petković
—	MF	AUS	Tony Popovic
—	DF	CRO	Ante Rumora
—	DF	AUS	Robert Stanton
—	DF	AUS	Ivan Topić (Youth)
—	FW	AUS	Matthew Zec
—	DF	AUS	Ante Žižić

=== Transfers in ===
No.	Pos.	Nat.	Name	Age	Moving from	Type	Transfer window	Ends	Transfer fee	Source
	GK	(Australia)	Tony Franken	31	Leichhardt Tigers (Australia)	Transfer	Pre-season		Undisclosed	
	MF	(Australia)	John Gibson	22	Leichhardt Tigers (Australia)	Transfer	Pre-season		$20,000	
	MF	(Australia)	Eric Hristodoulou	22	Sydney Olympic (Australia)	Transfer	Pre-season		Undisclosed	
	DF	(Croatia)	Ante Rumora	32	Free agent	Free	Pre-season		Free	

=== Transfers out ===
No.	Pos.	Nat.	Name	Age	Moving to	Type	Transfer window	Transfer fee	Source
	GK	(Australia)	Mark Bosnich	20	Aston Villa (England)	Transfer	Pre-season	Free	
	DF	(Australia)	Mike Grbevski	25	Adelaide City (Australia)	Transfer	Pre-season	Undisclosed	
	MF	(Australia)	Pedro Ricoy	25	West Adelaide Sharks (Australia)	Transfer	Pre-season	Undisclosed	
	FW	(Argentina)	José Iriarte	26	West Adelaide Sharks (Australia)	Transfer	Pre-season	Undisclosed	
	MF	(Kosovo)	Fadil Muriqi	32	Canberra Metro (Australia)	Transfer	Pre-season	Undisclosed	
	DF	(Croatia)	Miro Stipić	29	Canberra Metro (Australia)	Transfer	Pre-season	Undisclosed	
	DF	(Croatia)	Željko Jurin	31	Wollongong United (Australia)	Transfer	Pre-season	Undisclosed	
	DF	(Australia)	Robert Runje	23	Altona Magic (Australia)	Transfer	Pre-season	Undisclosed	
	MF	(Australia)	George Jolevski	23	Marconi Fairfield (Australia)	Transfer	Pre-season	Undisclosed	
	DF	(Australia)	Craig Jones	20	Granville Chile (Australia)	End of Contract	Pre-season	Free	

== Competitions ==
=== Overview ===
Competition	First match	Last match	Starting round	Final position	Record							
Competition	First match	Last match	Starting round	Final position	Pld	W	D	L	GF	GA	GD	Win %
National Soccer League	8 October 1992	7 April 1993	Matchday 1	7th	26	12	3	11	32	41	−9	46.15
NSL Cup	13 January 1993	3 March 1993	Second round	Semi-Final	3	1	0	2	5	6	−1	33.33
Total					29	13	3	13	37	47	−10	44.83

Last updated: complete
Source: Competitions

=== National Soccer League ===
==== League table ====
Pos	Team	Pld	W	D	L	GF	GA	GD	Pts	Qualification or relegation
1	South Melbourne	26	18	4	4	51	23	+28	58	Qualification for the Finals series
2	Marconi Fairfield (C)	26	17	2	7	57	31	+26	53	Qualification for the Finals series
3	Adelaide City	26	12	5	9	37	34	+3	41	Qualification for the Finals series
4	Wollongong City	26	11	6	9	33	27	+6	39	Qualification for the Finals series
5	West Adelaide	26	12	3	11	43	39	+4	39	Qualification for the Finals series
6	Parramatta Eagles	26	11	6	9	39	41	−2	39	Qualification for the Finals series
7	Sydney CSC	26	12	3	11	36	41	−5	39	
8	Newcastle Breakers	26	10	8	8	38	29	+9	38	
9	Sydney Olympic	26	10	4	12	36	31	+5	34	
10	Melbourne Croatia	26	10	4	12	38	39	−1	34	
11	Heidelberg United	26	7	9	10	30	40	−10	30	
12	Morwell Falcons	26	7	7	12	29	43	−14	28	
13	Preston Makedonia (R)	26	6	4	16	28	45	−17	18 (Note: Preston Makedonia deducted 4 points for crowd disturbances.)	Relegation to the Victorian Premier League
14	Brisbane United	26	5	3	18	32	64	−32	18	

Updated to match(es) played on unknown. Source: rsssf.com
Rules for classification: 1) points; 2) goal difference; 3) number of goals scored.
(C) Champions; (R) Relegated

==== Matches ====
4 October 1992 1	South Melbourne	2-1	Sydney CSC	Melbourne
	Boutsianis; Awaritefe	Report	Lamond	Stadium: Middle Park; Attendance: 3,679

11 October 1992 2	Sydney CSC	1–0	Marconi Fairfield	Sydney
	Gibson	Report		Stadium: Sydney Croatian Sports Centre; Attendance: 2,623

18 October 1992 3	Preston	1-3	Sydney CSC	Melbourne
	Zinni	Report	Milicevic; Gibson; Zec	Stadium: BT Connor Reserve; Attendance: 4,881

25 October 1992 4	Sydney CSC	1–2	Newcastle Breakers	Sydney
	Gibson	Report	Stewart; Spink	Stadium: Sydney Croatian Sports Centre; Attendance: 1,859

1 November 1992 5	Morwell Falcons	2–0	Sydney CSC	Melbourne
	Wright 60', 80'	Report		Stadium: Falcons Park; Attendance: 2,940; Referee: Ziggy Mnich

8 November 1992 6	Sydney CSC	2-1	Parramatta Eagles	Sydney
	Gibson 20'; Krslovic 59'	Report	Foster 84'	Stadium: Sydney Croatian Sports Centre; Attendance: 4,275; Referee: Rob Davies

15 November 1992 7	Adelaide City	0-1	Sydney CSC	Adelaide
		Report	Krslovic	Stadium: Hindmarsh Stadium; Attendance: 3,558

22 November 1992 8	Sydney CSC	0-0	Heidelberg United	Sydney
		Report		Stadium: Sydney Croatian Sports Centre; Attendance: 3,150

29 November 1992 9	Melbourne CSC	1-3	Sydney CSC	Melbourne
	Kelic	Report	Hristodoulou; Gibson; Lamond	Stadium: Somers Street; Attendance: 2,701

6 December 1992 10	Sydney CSC	3-0	Brisbane United	Sydney
	Kupresak; Gibson; Krslovic	Report		Stadium: Sydney Croatian Sports Centre; Attendance: 2,128

13 December 1992 11	Sydney Olympic	3–1	Sydney CSC	Sydney
	Ironside; Arambasic; Ardone	Report	Zec	Stadium: St George Stadium; Attendance: 4,674

20 December 1992 12	Sydney CSC	1-0	Wollongong City	Sydney
	Krslovic	Report		Stadium: Sydney Croatian Sports Centre; Attendance: 1,923

28 December 1992 13	West Adelaide Sharks	1-1	Sydney Croatia	Adelaide
	Iriarte	Report	Krslovic	Stadium: Hindmarsh Stadium; Attendance: 4,473

3 January 1993 14	Marconi Fairfield	1–1	Sydney Croatia	Sydney
	Johnson	Report	Caleta	Stadium: Marconi Stadium; Attendance: 5,154

10 January 1993 15	Sydney Croatia	2-5	South Melbourne	Sydney
	Krslovic 14'; Lamond	Report	Awaritefe 2'; Stanton (og) 16'; Trimboli; Tsolakis	Stadium: Sydney Croatian Sports Centre; Attendance: 4,010

17 January 1992 16	Sydney CSC	3–1	Preston	Sydney
	Gibson; Krslovic	Report	Najdovski	Stadium: Sydney Croatian Sports Centre; Attendance: 1,724

24 January 1993 17	Newcastle Breakers	3-1	Sydney CSC	Newcastle
	Stewart; Meredith; Brown	Report	Krslovic	Stadium: Breakers Stadium; Attendance: 2,425

26 January 1992 18	Sydney CSC	3-0	Morwell Falcons	Sydney
	Petkovic; Popovic; Krslovic	Report		Stadium: Sydney Croatian Sports Centre; Attendance: 1,535

31 January 1993 19	Parramatta Eagles	3-0	Sydney CSC	Sydney
	Gomez; Genc; Katholos	Report		Stadium: Melita Stadium; Attendance: 3,412

7 February 1993 20	Sydney CSC	0–2	Adelaide City	Sydney
		Report	Villani; Veart	Stadium: Sydney Croatian Sports Centre; Attendance: 2,028

14 February 1993 21	Heidelberg United	3-0	Sydney CSC	Melbourne
	Michalakopoulos; Dick; Gnjidic	Report		Stadium: Olympic Village; Attendance: 1,611

21 February 1993 22	Sydney CSC	1-2	Melbourne CSC	Sydney
	Jermen	Report	Kelic	Stadium: Sydney Croatian Sports Centre; Attendance: 1,234

28 February 1993 23	Brisbane United	1-3	Sydney CSC	Brisbane
	Popovic (og) 30'	Report	Milicevic 15'; Jermen 59'; Caleta 68'	Stadium: Perry Park; Attendance: 1,318

28 March 1993 24	Sydney CSC	0-5	Sydney Olympic	Sydney
		Report	Seal; Ironside	Stadium: Sydney Croatian Sports Centre; Attendance: 3,271

4 April 1993 25	Wollongong City	1–2	Sydney CSC	Wollongong
	O'Shea	Report	Krslovic; own goal	Stadium: Brandon Park; Attendance: 3,985

11 April 1993 26	Sydney CSC	2-1	West Adelaide Sharks	Sydney
	Popovic; Gibson	Report	own goal	Stadium: Sydney Croatian Sports Centre; Attendance: 2,026

=== NSL Cup ===
13 January 1993 Second round 1st Leg	Sydney CSC	0–2	Marconi Fairfield	Sydney
		Report	Iocca 18', 43'	Stadium: Sydney Croatian Sports Centre; Attendance: 1,151; Referee: Rob Davies

10 February 1993 Second round 1st Leg	Marconi Fairfield	2-4	Sydney CSC	Sydney
	Pelucchi 28'; Harper 35'	Report	Hristodoulou 37'; Popovic 47'; Gibson 49', 59'	Stadium: Marconi Stadium; Attendance: 888; Referee: Richard Lorenc

3 March 1993 Semi Final	Parramatta Eagles	2-1	Sydney CSC	Sydney
	Gunning 47', 77'	Report	Jermen 6'	Stadium: Marconi Stadium; Attendance: 1,381; Referee: Gary Brownlie

== Statistics ==
=== Appearances and goals ===
Players with no appearances not included in the list.

No.	Pos.	Nat.	Name	National Soccer League		NSL Cup		Total	
No.	Pos.	Nat.	Name	Apps	Goals	Apps	Goals	Apps	Goals
—	DF	(Australia)	Mark Babic	17	0	2	0	19	0
—	FW	(Australia)	Joe Caleta	22	2	3	0	25	2
—	GK	(Australia)	Tony Franken	15	0	1	0	16	0
—	FW	(Australia)	John Gibson	26	7	3	2	29	9
—	MF	(Australia)	Eric Hristodoulou	22	1	2	1	24	2
—	FW	(Australia)	Mario Jermen	9	2	3	1	12	3
—	MF	(Australia)	Mirko Jurilj	1	0	1	0	2	0
—	GK	(Australia)	Zeljko Kalac	11	0	2	0	13	0
—	FW	(Australia)	Tony Krslovic	24	11	1	0	25	11
—	DF	(Croatia)	Velimir Kupresak	24	1	3	0	27	1
—	FW	(Papua New Guinea)	Manis Lamond	16	4	0	0	16	4
—	MF	(Australia)	Tomislav Milicevic	20	2	2	0	22	2
—	FW	(Australia)	Ante Milicic	6	1	0	0	6	1
—	MF	(Australia)	Ante Moric	5	0	1	0	6	0
—	MF	(Croatia)	Ivan Petković	20	1	3	0	23	1
—	MF	(Australia)	Tony Popovic	24	2	3	1	27	3
—	DF	(Croatia)	Ante Rumora	20	1	1	0	21	1
—	DF	(Australia)	Robert Stanton	23	0	3	0	26	0
—	MF	(Australia)	Ivan Topić	1	0	1	0	2	0
—	FW	(Australia)	Matthew Zec	21	2	2	0	23	2
—	DF	(Australia)	Ante Žižić	6	0	0	0	6	0
