= List of Western Sydney Wanderers FC head coaches =

Western Sydney Wanderers FC are a professional association football club based in Rooty Hill, New South Wales. They were founded in 2012. They then became the fourth team based in NSW and the second based in Sydney to compete in the A-League.

There have been six managers in their history (including two caretakers), the first being Tony Popovic and the current being Marko Rudan. Popovic has been the club's most successful manager, winning the 2012–13 A-League Premiership and the 2014 AFC Champions League whilst in charge.

== Statistics ==
Key

- Nationality – If the manager played international football as a player, the country/countries he played for are shown. Otherwise, the manager's nationality is given as their country of birth.
- From – The year of the manager's first game for Western Sydney Wanderers.
- To – The year of the manager's last game for Western Sydney Wanderers.
- P – The number of competitive games managed for Western Sydney Wanderers.
- W – The number of games won as a manager.
- D – The number of games draw as a manager.
- L – The number of games lost as a manager.
- GF – The number of goals scored under his management.
- GA – The number of goals conceded under his management.
- GD – The goal difference under his management
- Win% – The total winning percentage under his management.
- Honours – The trophies and awards won while managing Western Sydney Wanderers.
- Italics † – Denotes that the manager was only a caretaker during his tenure

Note: Games included are A-League (including finals), FFA Cup, AFC Champions League and FIFA Club World Cup. Friendlies are not included.

As of 7 May 2023

Image	Name	Nationality	From	To	P	W	D	L	GF	GA	GD	Win%	Honours	Source
	Tony Popovic	Australia	17 May 2012	1 October 2017	180	77	40	63	256	196	+60	42.78	Team; 2012–13 A-League Premiership; 2014 AFC Champions League; Individual; 2012–13 A-League Coach of the Year; 2014 Asian Coach of the Year	
	Hayden Foxe †	Australia	3 October 2017	1 November 2017	6	1	4	1	9	3	+6	16.67		
	Josep Gombau	Spain	1 November 2017	19 April 2018	22	7	5	10	30	34	-4	31.82		
	Markus Babbel	Germany	19 May 2018	20 January 2020	48	15	8	25	73	78	-5	31.25		
	Jean-Paul de Marigny	Australia	20 January 2020 (Note: De Marigny served as caretaker manager until 14 July 2020, when he was hired on a permanent basis.)	12 October 2020	12	5	4	3	21	19	+2	41.67		
	Carl Robinson	Wales	15 October 2020	30 January 2022	35	11	11	13	56	57	-1	31.43		
	Marko Rudan	Australia	31 January 2022	16 May 2024	47	16	14	17	68	39	+29	34.04		
	Alen Stajcic	Australia	25 June 2024	Present	29	15	7	7	64	42	+22	51.72		
