= 1997 National Soccer League grand final =

1997 National Soccer League Grand Final
- Event: 1996–97 National Soccer League
Brisbane Strikers	Sydney United
2	0
- Date: 25 May 1997
- Venue: Lang Park, Brisbane, Australia
- Man of the Match: Alan Hunter (Joe Marston Medal)
- Referee: Simon Micallef
- Attendance: 40,446

The 1997 National Soccer League Grand Final was held on 25 May 1997 between Brisbane Strikers and Sydney United at Lang Park. Brisbane gained home advantage because despite finishing below United on the league standings, they defeated the Sydney side in the major semi-final two weeks earlier. The teams were all locked up at half time, however two goals for the Strikers by Frank Farina and Rod Brown secured their first NSL championship. Alan Hunter won the Joe Marston Medal.

== Route to the final ==
=== League Standings ===
Pos	Team	Pld	W	D	L	GF	GA	GD	Pts	Qualification or relegation
1	Sydney United	26	17	5	4	67	33	+34	56	1997 National Soccer League Finals
2	Brisbane Strikers (C)	26	15	2	9	55	40	+15	47	1996-97 National Soccer League Champions
3	South Melbourne	26	14	4	8	39	25	+14	46	1997 National Soccer League Finals
4	Adelaide City	26	11	10	5	32	22	+10	43	1997 National Soccer League Finals
5	Marconi Stallions	26	12	4	10	41	37	+4	40	1997 National Soccer League Finals
6	Melbourne Knights	26	11	6	9	36	32	+4	39	1997 National Soccer League Finals
7	Perth Glory	26	11	5	10	48	41	+7	38	
8	West Adelaide	26	10	3	13	39	51	−12	33	
9	UTS Olympic	26	8	8	10	41	46	−5	32	
10	Wollongong Wolves	26	8	8	10	42	48	−6	32	
11	Newcastle Breakers	26	7	9	10	40	46	−6	30	
12	Gippsland Falcons	26	8	6	12	33	41	−8	30	
13	Collingwood Warriors (R)	26	6	9	11	32	44	−12	27	Disbanded at end of season
14	Canberra Cosmos	26	2	5	19	30	69	−39	11	

Source: rsssf.com
Rules for classification: 1) points; 2) goal difference; 3) number of goals scored.
(C) Champions; (R) Relegated

=== Finals Bracket ===
Elimination finals
3	South Melbourne	4	3	(7)
6	Melbourne Knights	1	0	(1)
4	Adelaide City	0	4	(4)
5	Marconi Fairfield	3	0	(3)

Semifinals
1	Sydney United	0	2	(2)
2	Brisbane Strikers (a)	1	1	(2)
South Melbourne	1
Adelaide City	0

Preliminary final
Sydney United	1
South Melbourne	0

Grand final
Sydney United	0
Brisbane Strikers	2

== Match ==
=== Details ===
25 May 1997
15:00 AEST

Brisbane Strikers	2–0	Sydney United
Farina 47'; Brown 69'	Reports

Suncorp Stadium, Brisbane
Attendance: 40,446
Referee: Simon Micallef

GK	1	(Australia) Clint Bolton
DF	2	(Australia) Glen Gwynne	(substituted off) 88'
DF	3	(Australia) Alan Hunter
FW	5	(Australia) Frank Farina	(substituted off) 80'
MF	6	(Australia) Sean Cranney
FW	7	(Australia) Rod Brown
FW	9	(Australia) Danny Wright
MF	11	(Australia) Troy Cranney
MF	15	(Australia) Chay Hews	(substituted off) 79'
DF	16	(Australia) Kasey Wehrman
FW	17	(Australia) Craig Williams
Substitutes:
FW	8	(Australia) Matt Bell	(substituted on) 88'
FW	10	(Australia) Reece Tollenaere	(substituted on) 80'
MF	12	(Australia) Jeremy Harris	(substituted on) 79'
Manager:
(Australia) Frank Farina
Joe Marston Medal:
Alan Hunter (Brisbane Strikers)

GK	1	(Australia) Zeljko Kalac
DF	2	(Australia) Rob Trajkovski	(substituted off) 63'
DF	5	(Australia) Velimir Kupresak
DF	7	(Australia) Mark Babic
MF	10	(Australia) Richard Plesa
MF	11	(Croatia) Kresimir Marusic
MF	12	(Australia) Ante Moric
FW	14	(Australia) Ante Milicic
MF	15	(Australia) Aytec Genc
FW	17	(Australia) David Zdrilic
MF	23	(Australia) Paul Bilokapic	(substituted off) 81'
Substitutes:
MF	3	(Australia) Jason Culina	(substituted on) 63'
DF	25	(Australia) Mark Rudan	(substituted on) 81'
Manager:
(Australia) Branko Culina

Assistant referees:
Fourth official:

Match rules

- 90 minutes.
- 30 minutes of extra time if necessary.
- Penalty shoot-out if scores still level.
