= 2013 National Premier Leagues Grand Final =

- Event: 2013 National Premier Leagues
South Hobart	Sydney United 58
0	2
- Date: 13 October 2013
- Venue: KGV Park, Glenorchy
- Referee: Chris Young
- Attendance: 1,150
- Weather: Mostly cloudy 16 °C (61 °F)

The 2013 National Premier Leagues Grand Final was the first National Premier Leagues Grand Final. It was played on 13 October 2013 at KGV Park in Glenorchy between South Hobart and Sydney United 58. Sydney United 58 won 2–0 to secure their inaugural National Premier Leagues title.

== Route to the final ==
Quarter-finals
(Victoria (state)) ~~No Participant~~
(Tasmania) South Hobart
(South Australia) Campbelltown City
(Western Australia) ~~No Participant~~
(Queensland) Olympic FC
(New South Wales) ~~No Participant~~
(New South Wales) Sydney United 58	2
(Australian Capital Territory) Canberra FC	1

Semi-finals
(Tasmania) South Hobart	3
(South Australia) Campbelltown City	1
(Queensland) Olympic FC	3
(New South Wales) Sydney United 58	4

Grand Final
(Tasmania) South Hobart	0
(New South Wales) Sydney United 58	2

== Match ==
13 October
14:00 AEST

South Hobart (Tasmania)	0–2	(New South Wales) Sydney United 58
	Report	Trifiro 11'; Haydar 15'

Perry Park, Brisbane
Attendance: 1,105
Referee: Adrian Arndt

GK	1	(Australia) Matthew Ferguson
RB	2	(Australia) Liam Scott
CB	5	(Australia) Hugh Ludford (c)
CB	3	(Australia) Lucas Hill
LB	18	(Australia) Cameron Williams
RM	7	(Australia) Shae Hickey
LM	20	(Australia) Caleb Ludlow
RW	13	(Australia) Chris Hunt		(substituted off) 76'
CAM	17	(Australia) Nick Morton		(substituted off) 74'
LW	9	(Australia) Kostas Kanakaris	(yellow card) 77'
ST	10	(Australia) Jordan Templin
Substitutes:
GK	21	(Australia) Kane Pierce
DF	4	(Australia) Cameron Rogers		(substituted on) 74'
MF	6	(Australia) Josh Fielding
FW	11	(Australia) Ben Hamlett	(red card) 81'	(substituted on) 76'
FW	14	(Australia) Matt Lewis
MF	15	(Australia) Josh Fielding
DF	16	(Brazil) Mizael Linhares Caires
FW	19	(Australia) Colin Wain
Manager:
(England) Ken Morton

GK	1	(Australia) Paul Henderson
RB	4	(Australia) Nathan Sherlock
CB	20	(Australia) Ibrahim Haydar
CB	3	(Australia) Ben Jurmin
LB	23	(Australia) Ante Tomic	(yellow card) 90+3'
DM	2	(Australia) Mitchell Speer
RM	6	(Australia) Mitchell Stamatellis
LM	19	(Australia) Matthew Bilic		(substituted off) 86'
RW	8	(Japan) Yuichi Yamayuchi		(substituted off) 65'
ST	11	(Australia) Luka Glavas (c)		(substituted off) 78'
LW	18	(Australia) Glen Trifiro	(yellow card) 86'
Substitutes:
GK	30	(United States) Jordan Jennings
DF	5	(Australia) Calum O'Connell
FW	7	(Australia) Mirjan Pavlović		(substituted on) 76'
FW	9	(Australia) Robert Mileski		(substituted on) 65'
DF	12	(Australia) Tomislav Herceg
MF	15	(Australia) Anthony Tomelic
DF	16	(Australia) Stjepan Paric
DF	21	(Australia) Theo Kofinas
FW	22	(Australia) Daniel Barac		(substituted on) 86'
Manager:
(Australia) Mark Rudan

Assistant referees:
(Australia) Adam Coombes
(Australia) Jimmy Hortle
Fourth official:
(Australia) Brenton Kopra

Match rules

- 90 minutes.
- 30 minutes of extra time if necessary.
- Penalty shoot-out if scores still level.
- Maximum of three substitutions.
