= A-League Men Coach of the Year =

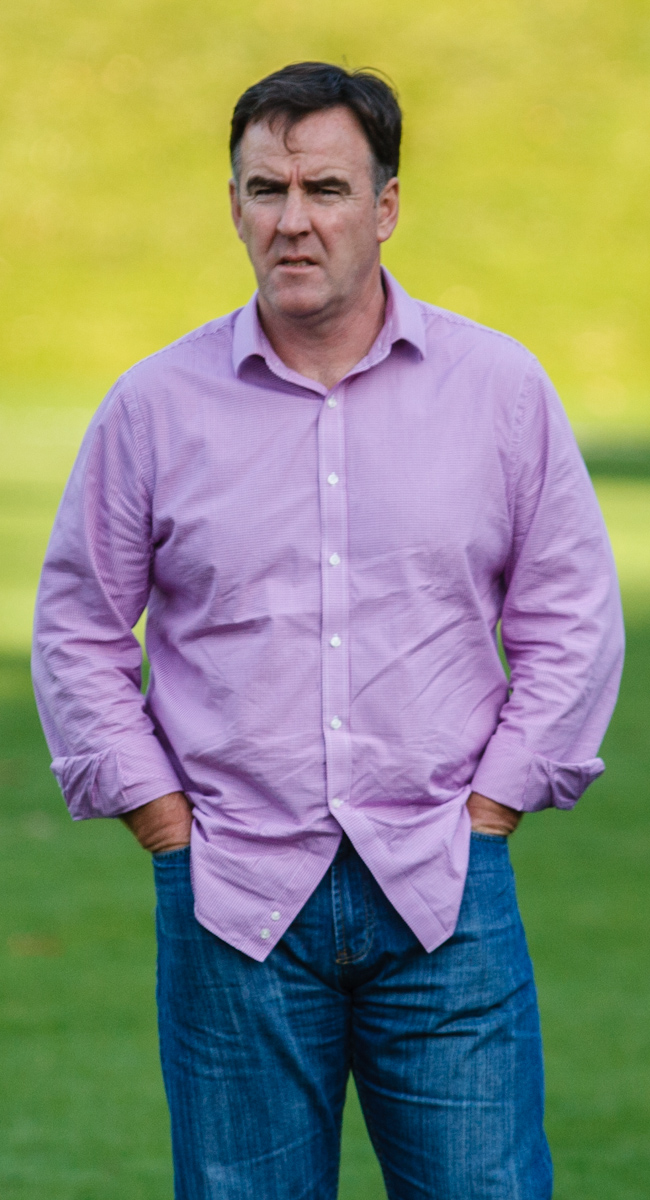
- Lawrie McKinna won the inaugural Coach of the Year award in 2006.
- Awarded for: The outstanding manager in each given A-League season
- Country: Australia
- Presented by: Football Federation Australia
- First award: 2006
- Final award: 2026
- Coach of the Year: Mark Milligan

Highlights
- Most awards: Graham Arnold & Tony Popovic (3)

The A-League Men Coach of the Year is an annual soccer award presented to coaches in Australia. It recognises the most outstanding manager in the A-League Men each season. The recipient is chosen by a vote of all coaches at the conclusion of the regular season. The award was established in the first A-League season, 2005–06.

In 2006, the inaugural Coach of the Year award was given to Lawrie McKinna, who took Central Coast Mariners to the 2006 A-League Grand Final. The current holder of the award is Steve Corica.

Three coaches have won the award multiple times, Graham Arnold in 2012, 2017, and 2018, Ernie Merrick in 2007 and 2010, and Tony Popovic in 2013, 2019, and 2022.

== Winners ==
Season	Manager	Nationality	Club	Ref
2005–06	Lawrie McKinna	Scotland	Central Coast Mariners	
2006–07	Ernie Merrick	Scotland	Melbourne Victory	
2007–08	Gary van Egmond	Australia	Newcastle Jets	
2008–09	Aurelio Vidmar	Australia	Adelaide United	
2009–10	Ernie Merrick (2)	Scotland	Melbourne Victory	
2010–11	Ange Postecoglou	Australia	Brisbane Roar	
2011–12	Graham Arnold	Australia	Central Coast Mariners	
2012–13	Tony Popovic	Australia	Western Sydney Wanderers	
2013–14	Mike Mulvey	England	Brisbane Roar	
2014–15	Kevin Muscat	Australia	Melbourne Victory	
2015–16	Guillermo Amor	Spain	Adelaide United	
2016–17	Graham Arnold (2)	Australia	Sydney FC	
2017–18	Graham Arnold (3)	Australia	Sydney FC	
2018–19	Tony Popovic (2)	Australia	Perth Glory	
2019–20	Erick Mombaerts	France	Melbourne City	
2020–21	Patrick Kisnorbo	Australia	Melbourne City	
2021–22	Tony Popovic (3)	Australia	Melbourne Victory	
2022–23	Carl Veart	Australia	Adelaide United	
2023–24	Mark Jackson	England	Central Coast Mariners	
2024–25	Steve Corica	Australia	Auckland FC	
2025–26	Mark Milligan	Australia	Newcastle Jets	

== Awards won by nationality ==
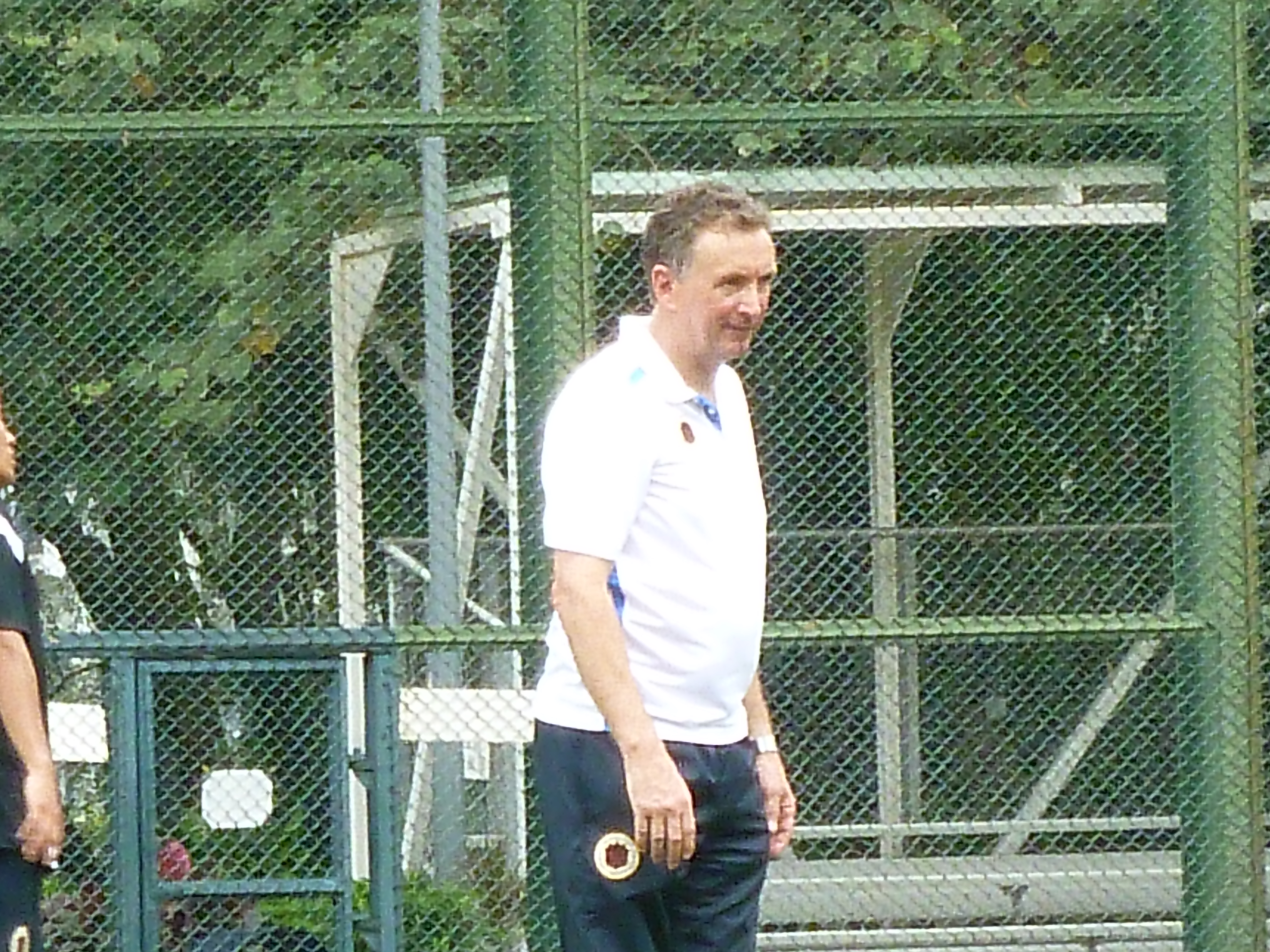
Ernie Merrick is the only foreign coach to have won the award twice.

Country	Wins
Australia	14
Scotland	3
England	2
France	1
Spain	1

== Awards won by club ==
Club	Wins
Melbourne Victory	4
Adelaide United	3
Central Coast Mariners	3
Brisbane Roar	2
Sydney FC	2
Melbourne City	2
Newcastle Jets	2
Auckland FC	1
Perth Glory	1
Western Sydney Wanderers	1
