= Marko Rudan =

Australian soccer player and manager

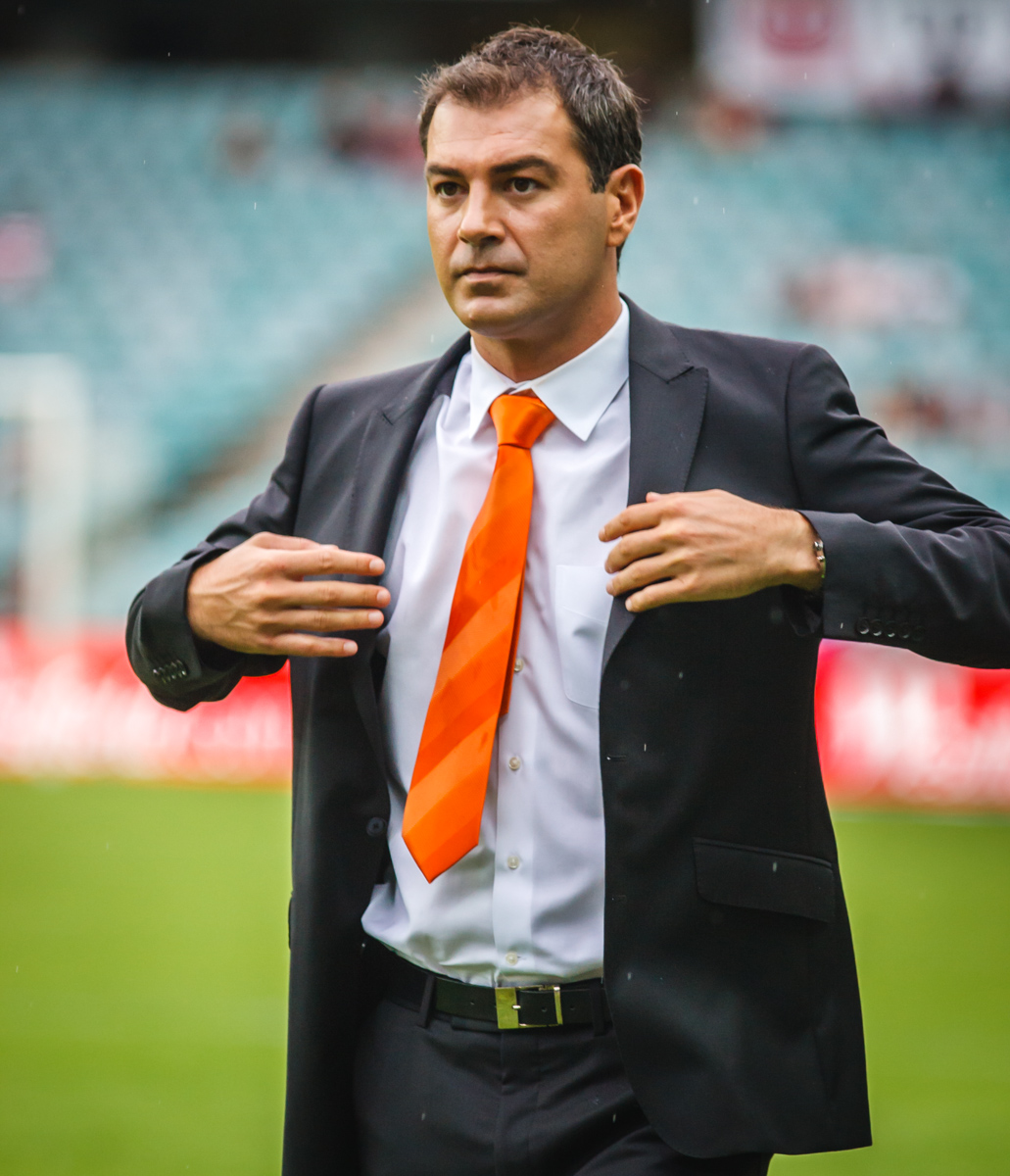
- Rudan in 2012

Personal information
- Full name: Marko Ante Rudan
- Date of birth: 27 August 1975 (age 51)
- Place of birth: Sydney, Australia
- Height: 1.91 m (6 ft 3 in)
- Position: Centre-back

Team information
- Current team: Dalian Yingbo (assistant coach)

Youth career
- Sydney United 58
- 1992–1993: AIS

Senior career*
Years	Team	Apps	(Gls)
1993–1998	Sydney United	73	(6)
1998	Bankstown City	3	(0)
1998–2000	Northern Spirit	46	(2)
2000–2002	Alemannia Aachen	45	(1)
2002	Nanjing Yoyo	24	(3)
2003–2004	Sydney United	37	(0)
2004	Public Bank	21	(4)
2005–2007	Sydney FC	61	(6)
2008	Avispa Fukuoka	26	(0)
2009	FC Vaduz	17	(1)
2009–2010	Adelaide United	19	(0)
2011	Sydney United		
Total		372	(23)

International career
1993–1995	Australia U-20	21	(3)
1995–1996	Australia U-23	14	(2)

Managerial career
- 2012: Rockdale City Suns
- 2013–2016: Sydney United 58
- 2016–2017: Australia U-20 (assistant)
- 2017: Sydney United 58
- 2018–2019: Wellington Phoenix
- 2019–2021: Western United
- 2022–2024: Western Sydney Wanderers
- 2026–: Dalian Yingbo (assistant)
Medal record
Representing Australia
Men's Association football
OFC U-20 Championship
Winner	1994 Fiji
- * Club domestic league appearances and goals

Marko Ante "Mark" Rudan (born 27 August 1975) is an Australian association football manager and former player.

Rudan was one of the inaugural inductees into the Sydney FC Hall of Fame in 2015. After four successful years as head coach of Sydney United, which included two National Premier Leagues titles, Rudan decided to leave his post to work with the Australia national under-20 soccer team, but returned shortly into the 2017 season.

== Club career ==
Rudan joined NSL club Sydney United in 1993 at completion of the AIS program. He spent much of his five seasons at United totalling 73 NSL appearances by the end of the 1997–98 season. He was signed to new club Northern Spirit for the 1998–99 NSL season. In the first match of the season he was sent off. After serving a one-match suspension, he made amends in Round 3 scoring twice in a 2–1 win. He went on to start almost all matches that year, although saw red again in Round 16 (also against Olympic). Spirit finished fifth, but were eliminated in the first semi-final stage. Rudan was again a key figure in the 1999–00 season, playing 22 games, a less successful year for the club, slumping to the bottom half of the table.

=== Overseas ===
In mid-2000, unhappy with his situation at Spirit, Rudan bought out the remainder of his contract and moved to German second division club Alemannia Aachen on a free transfer. Eligibility for a Croatian passport ensured he could play in Europe. The move started well on the pitch, working his way into the first team, but he would later become embroiled in a corruption scandal known as the 'suitcase affair'. In 2001, allegations of financial irregularity arose over the transfers of Rudan and fellow Australian Goran Lozanovski. Rudan was arrested by German authorities and later released. Charges were eventually laid on Aachen's treasurer Bernd Krings, who was convicted of financial fraud. It was revealed that persons claiming to represent Rudan and Northern Spirit collected DM 290,000 in a suitcase from Aachen as a transfer fee. Documents outlining the transfer fee were shown to be falsified as Spirit neither requested nor received any fee for the player. Similar circumstances were revealed surrounding Lozanovski's transfer from South Melbourne, but both players were cleared of any wrongdoing.

Rudan returned to on-field matters but unable to settle in the team, he and the club sought to part ways. After rumoured transfers to other German clubs, he was released by Aachen in January 2002. He continued on to a spell at Nanjing Yoyo in the Chinese first-division, before returning to Australia to link up again with Sydney United. Now a seasoned player with international experience, Rudan appeared regularly for the NSL club throughout the 2002–03 calendar but could not help them reach the finals round. He cemented his place in the team for the next (and ultimately last) NSL season. After missing the first match through injury, Rudan played every remaining game for United that year. With the Australian league collapsing he again sought a move overseas, joining Public Bank in the new Malaysian Super League, where he won the defender of the year award helping his team achieve its best ever finish to a season in 2nd place.

=== Sydney FC ===
Sydney FC's formation as a new club in 2005 for the new A-League included enticing Australians playing abroad to return home. Mark was signed into the inaugural squad and honoured as club captain. It was not until late in the season playing solidly in the last regular season matches and scoring the winner against Adelaide United in the semi-final second-leg, and Sydney went on to win the final and became the inaugural A-League Champions.

Yorke's departure as the 2006–07 season started, saw Rudan reinstated as captain but the year started on a low as Mark was sent off after just 14 minutes against Melbourne Victory in the second match of the new season. He returned from suspension for new coach Terry Butcher. After Sydney were knocked out during the domestic finals competition, the club continued on to the 2007 AFC Champions League. Rudan captained the side through the group matches, playing all six games, and drawing upon his previous experiences in Asian football. With the arrival of Socceroo hero Tony Popovic at the start of the 2007–08 season, Rudan handed him the captaincy.

On 15 December 2007, Rudan farewelled a home crowd of 12,530 following their 4–2 defeat to Perth Glory. Popovic handed his captaincy back to Rudan for this final game. His time at Sydney FC was extremely successful. He is remembered as the club's first Footballing Legend as more than 4000 fans waited outside the stadium singing his name after the game in acknowledgement of his achievements for the club.

=== Avispa Fukuoka ===
In December 2007, Rudan signed a deal with J2 League side Avispa Fukuoka, linking up with his former coach of Sydney FC Pierre Littbarski and replacing former teammate Alvin Ceccoli.

=== FC Vaduz ===
On 6 January 2009, Rudan signed for Axpo Super League (Switzerland 1st division) team FC Vaduz, based in Liechtenstein on a free transfer. The contract ran until 30 June 2010. He again linked up with his former manager at Avispa Fukuoka.

=== Adelaide United ===
On 6 August 2009, before the start of the 2009–10 A-League season, Rudan joined Adelaide United on a one-year contract. Despite this, United announced he would not play against Perth Glory on 7 August in the Reds' first game of the new season. He left Adelaide after their final group game in the AFC Champions League as he announced his retirement as a player, and intends to move into coaching.

== International career ==
Rudan's footballing talent was first recognised in 1992 as he was granted a place in the AIS program, aimed at developing players for national youth teams. He joined the Young Socceroos squad for a South American tour in 1993, including a youth tournament mostly including club sides. Rudan was made vice captain to Mark Viduka in Australia's undefeated Youth World Cup qualifying campaign and scored the only goal of the Oceania final against New Zealand. As part of the squad for the 1995 Youth World Cup, Rudan played three of Australia's four matches including their second round exit in extra time at the hands of Portugal. He progressed his way into the national under-23 team and played most matches qualifying for the Olympics in Atlanta.

== Coaching career ==
After his short stint at Adelaide United and the announcement of his professional retirement as a player, Rudan moved into coaching, becoming the first grade coach for first division NSW club, Rockdale City Suns in 2012.

In 2013, Rudan departed from Rockdale City Suns and was appointed head coach of Sydney United 58. In his first season, Rudan helped win the NSW Premier League Premiership and then go on to win the inaugural season of the National Premier Leagues with his old club, which also saw him pick up the 2013 Coach of the Year. After 4 successful years coaching Sydney United 58 which included 2 NSW premierships and 2 Australian championships, Mark decided to leave his post as head coach to work with the Australian U/20 team.

=== Wellington Phoenix ===
On 30 May 2018, it was announced that Rudan has signed a two-year deal as head coach of Wellington Phoenix who play in the Australian A-League. Mark Rudan became the first ever Wellington Phoenix coach to win his first game in charge when the Wellington Phoenix were 2–1 victors over Newcastle Jets in the opening round of the 2018–19 season. He was announced as Coach of Round 1 following the victory. Following Round 2 clash with Brisbane Roar which ended in a 0–0 draw, it was the best start the team has had since the 2012/13 season. They suffered their first defeat of the season in Round 3 going down 3–0 to Western Sydney Wanderers. After disappointing results from Rounds 3 to 5, Wellington Phoenix drew 1–1 with league leaders Perth Glory in which he criticised the referee and the VAR for biased decisions, but no actions were taken. Wellington then shocked Sydney FC by winning 3–1 followed by another 2–0 win over Central Coast Mariners the following week. This marked Phoenix's first back-to-back wins since April 2017. He was again named Coach of the Round. It was announced on 15 April 2019 that Rudan would not see out the second year of his contract.

=== Western United ===
On 23 May 2019, Rudan was announced as the inaugural head coach for expansion A-League club Western United. Rudan guided Western United to a finals berth in the club's inaugural season, with the club finishing the season 5th with a record of 12 wins, 3 draws and 11 losses. Western United won their inaugural A-League finals match, defeating Brisbane Roar 1–0, before losing by the same scoreline to Melbourne City in the semi-final days later.

Rudan's second season in charge of Western United was less successful than his first, with the club finishing 10th with a record of 8 wins, 4 draws and 14 losses. Entering Round 18, Western United were in sixth place, and were on track to qualify for a second consecutive finals series. However, the club experienced a spectacular collapse, ending the season on a 9 match winless run, including 8 consecutive defeats in their final 8 matches of the season. On 8 June 2021, Rudan and Western United came to a mutual agreement to part ways following the end of the 2020–21 A-League season.

=== Western Sydney Wanderers ===
On 31 January 2022, Rudan was announced as the interim head coach of the Western Sydney Wanderers A-League men's team until the end of the 2021–22 season. The Wanderers made a bright start to life under new management, beating Perth Glory 1–0 in Mark Rudan’s first game in charge. On 4 March 2022, Rudan signed a permanent two-year extension until the end of the 2023–24 season. In the same week, Rudan guided Western Sydney to a 2–0 triumph over Sydney FC in the Sydney Derby.

On 16 May 2024, Rudan departed as Wanderers manager, by mutual consent.

=== Dalian Yingbo ===
On 26 April 2026, Rudan was appointed as the assistant coach of Chinese Super League club Dalian Yingbo.

== Personal life ==
Rudan's elder sister Mariana was a presenter on Australian football program The World Game.

Born "Marko", Rudan has been known for most of his professional life as "Mark". He reverted to using his birth name in 2022 in honour of his mother, Ana, who has been battling brain cancer.

Rudan's father, Luka Rudan, died in May 2025.

== Managerial statistics ==
As of 29 January 2024

Team	Nat	From	To	Record				
Team	Nat	From	To	G	W	D	L	Win %
Wellington Phoenix	(New Zealand)	May 2018	May 2019	29	11	7	11	37.93
Western United	(Australia)	May 2019	June 2021	54	21	7	26	38.89
Western Sydney Wanderers	(Australia)	January 2022	May 2024	60	23	17	20	38.33
Total				143	55	31	57	38.46

== Honours ==
=== Player ===
Australia U-20

- OFC U-20 Championship: 1994
