= Mark Babic =

Australian soccer player

Personal information
- Full name: Mark Babic
- Date of birth: 24 April 1973 (age 53)
- Position: Centre-back

Senior career*
Years	Team	Apps	(Gls)
1989	St George Saints	0	(0)
1989–1997	Sydney United	137	(2)
1997–2004	Marconi Stallions	102	(2)

International career^{‡}
1989	Australia U-17		
1991	Australia U-20		
1995–1996	Australia U-23	17	(0)
1997–1998	Australia	8	(0)
Medal record
Representing Australia
Men's Association football
OFC Nations Cup
Runner-up	1998 Australia
- * Club domestic league appearances and goals as of 25 August 2007 ‡ National team caps and goals as of 25 August 2007

Mark Babic (born 24 April 1973) is a former Australian soccer played who played as a defender.

== Early life ==
Babic was born in Australia to parents who had emigrated from Croatia.

== Playing career ==
=== Club career ===
He played in the NSL between 1989 and 2003 with clubs St George Saints, Sydney United and Marconi Stallions. With Sydney United he played 137 games for the club between 1989 and 1997 and played 102 games for Marconi between 1997 and 2003.

=== International career ===
Babic represented Australia at all levels, including playing all six games for the Australian U-20 team at the 1991 FIFA World Youth Championship in Portugal where Australia finished 4th and playing all 3 games for the Australian U-23's at the 1996 Summer Olympic games. He also was capped 8 times at senior level for Australia between 1997 and 1998.

== Honours ==
Australia

- OFC Nations Cup: runner-up 1998
