= Ante Moric =

Australian soccer player (born 1974)

Personal information
- Full name: Ante Tomislav Moric
- Date of birth: 19 April 1974 (age 52)
- Place of birth: Sydney, Australia
- Position: Midfielder

Team information
- Current team: Geelong (Head Coach)

Senior career*
Years	Team	Apps	(Gls)
1992–1997	Sydney United	102	(9)
1997	Zadar	1	(0)
1997–1998	Canberra Cosmos	20	(3)
1998–2000	Sydney United	31	(2)
2000–2001	Sydney Olympic	10	(1)
2002	Sydney United	7	(0)
2002	Fraser Park	7	(0)
2002–2003	APIA Leichhardt Tigers	24	(4)
2003–2004	Rockdale City Suns	21	(1)
Total		223	(20)

International career
1994–1996	Australia U23	12	(1)

Managerial career
- 2019: Dandenong City
- 2021: Western United Youth NPL
- 2022-2023: Bankstown City
- 2023: Pascoe Vale
- 2024–: Geelong
- * Club domestic league appearances and goals

Ante Tomislav Moric (born 19 April 1974) is an Australian professional soccer coach and former player who is the head coach for Geelong.

A midfielder, Moric represented Australia at youth, Olympic, and senior levels. After retirement he become a coach, initially at the Under 20 level at Sydney United in the NSW NPL, then St George, before being appointed head coach of Victorian NPL side Dandenong City in 2019.

== Playing career ==
Moric played at club level in Australia and Croatia for St. George, AIS, Sydney United, Zadar, Canberra Cosmos, Sydney Olympic, Fraser Park, APIA Leichhardt Tigers and Rockdale City Suns.

Moric represented the Australia men's national under-23 soccer team on several occasions, including at the 1996 Summer Olympics.

== Coaching career ==
In September 2011, Moric was hired as U13 manager for Sydney United 58 FC for the 2012 season. After a stint with the youth side of National Premier Leagues NSW 2 side St George FC, in April 2019 Moric was appointed as the new head coach of National Premier Leagues Victoria side Dandenong City SC, taking over the club in bottom place on the ladder. He left the position on 17 September 2019 and became a part of the technical staff and fitness department of Western United. Upon the announcement of Western United entering a team in the National Premier Leagues Victoria 3, Moric was named as the assistant coach of the squad as well as the head of youth football for the club.

In mid-2022, Moric signed as head coach for Bankstown City FC in NSW League Two. In May 2023 he became head coach of Pascoe Vale, before moving to Geelong.
