= Tony Krslovic =

Australian soccer player

Personal information
- Full name: Tony Krslovic
- Date of birth: 14 July 1969 (age 57)
- Place of birth: Sydney, Australia
- Position: Striker

Senior career*
Years	Team	Apps	(Gls)
1987–1989	Sydney United	21	(2)
1989–1990	St George FC	56	(22)
1990–1995	Sydney United	91	(35)
1996	APIA Leichhardt		
1996-98	Sydney United	2	(0)
1998	Manly United		
Total		170	(59)

International career^{‡}
1990	Australia	1	(0)
1990	Australia B	2	(0)

Managerial career
- 2002–03: Sydney United
- * Club domestic league appearances and goals as of 21 September 2023 ‡ National team caps and goals as of 21 September 2023

Tony Krslovic (born 14 July 1969) is a former Australian soccer player. He played as a striker for Sydney United and St George FC in the National Soccer League.

== Career ==
Krslovic played his whole career in the old National Soccer League (NSL) in Australia where he played for Sydney United and St George FC.

In 1996, Krslovic played for APIA Leichhardt in the NSW Super League competition, and also for Manly United during the 1998 NSW Super League season.

== International career ==
Krslovic was capped once for Australia, in a 3–0 win against Indonesia in August 1990, where he came off the bench. In addition to his international cap, Krslovic also represented Australia in two ‘B’ matches during the same year – against a touring Hajduk Split team and the Malaysian Under 23's team.

== Coaching career ==
During the 2002/03 NSL season, Branko Culina, Sydney United's manager at the time, departed from his role. In response to this change, Tony Krslovic and Tony Pezzano were appointed as co-coaches of Sydney United, jointly steering the team for the remainder of the season.

Most recently, he was coaching Sydney United 58 under 15's team.
