= Mario Jermen =

Australian soccer player

Personal information
- Date of birth: 2 February 1975 (age 51)
- Place of birth: Australia
- Position: Forward

Youth career
- 1990-91: St George FC

Senior career*
| Years | Team | Apps | (Gls) |
| 1993-95 | Sydney United 58 FC | 26 | (6) |
| 1995-96 | Wollongong Wolves FC | 24 | (9) |
| 1996 | Parramatta Eagles | | |
| 1997-1998 | Sydney United 58 FC | 11 | (1) |
| 1998-99 | NK Zadar | 11 | (1) |
| 1999 | PAOK FC | 1 | (0) |
| 1999 | NK Zadar | | |
| 1999-2000 | Sydney United 58 FC | 20 | (3) |
- * Club domestic league appearances and goals

Mario Jermen (born 2 February 1975 in Australia) is an Australian retired soccer player.

== Career ==
After playing in Australia and Croatia, Jermen signed for PAOK, one of the most successful teams in Greece, where he made one league appearance.

In 2004, Jermen claimed that a metal plate collapsing in a gas station ended his career by causing a severe ankle injury. According to him, he was unable to sign for an Australian or Chinese club as a result.
