= Tony Popovic =

Australian soccer manager (born 1973)

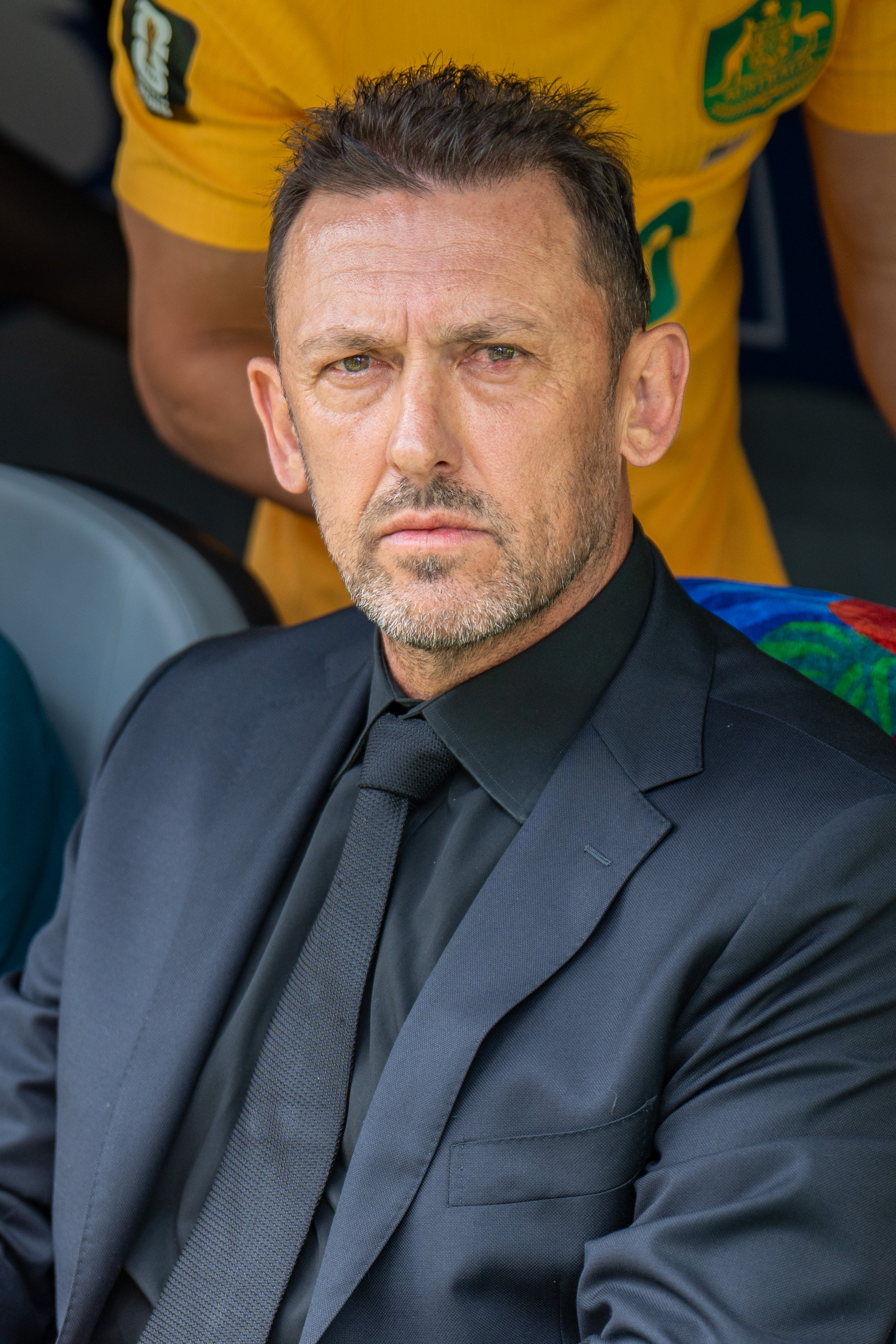
- Popovic in 2026

Personal information
- Full name: Tony Popovic
- Date of birth: 4 July 1973 (age 53)
- Place of birth: Sydney, New South Wales, Australia
- Height: 1.93 m (6 ft 4 in)
- Position: Centre-back

Team information
- Current team: Australia (head coach)

Youth career
- Sydney United

Senior career*
| Years | Team | Apps | (Gls) |
| 1989–1997 | Sydney United | 162 | (14) |
| 1994 | → Canberra FC (loan) | 5 | (1) |
| 1997–2001 | Sanfrecce Hiroshima | 87 | (13) |
| 2001–2006 | Crystal Palace | 123 | (6) |
| 2006–2007 | Al-Arabi | 17 | (2) |
| 2007–2008 | Sydney FC | 27 | (1) |
| Total | | 421 | (37) |

International career
| 1988–1989 | Australia U17 | 7 | (2) |
| 1990–1991 | Australia U20 | 9 | (1) |
| 1992 | Australia U23 | 4 | (0) |
| 1995–2006 | Australia | 58 | (8) |

Managerial career
- 2012–2017: Western Sydney Wanderers
- 2017: Karabükspor
- 2018–2020: Perth Glory
- 2020–2021: Xanthi
- 2021–2024: Melbourne Victory
- 2024–: Australia
Medal record
Representing Australia
Men's Association football
FIFA Confederations Cup
| Second place | 1997 |
| Third place | 2001 |
OFC Nations Cup
| Winner | 1996 |
| Winner | 2000 |
- * Club domestic league appearances and goals

Tony Popovic (Croatian: [pǒpovit͡ɕ]; born 4 July 1973) is an Australian professional soccer manager and former player who is head coach of the Australia national team.

Popovic played as a centre-back. Starting his career for Sydney United, he moved to Sanfrecce Hiroshima of the J.League and then flourished at English side Crystal Palace. He also represented Australia at the 2006 FIFA World Cup, two FIFA Confederations Cups and the 1992 Summer Olympics.

Popovic started his coaching career in 2008 with Sydney FC. After a brief stint as assistant manager at Palace, he was chosen as the inaugural manager of the Western Sydney Wanderers at the start of the 2012–13 season. His major managerial achievements are winning the 2012–13 A-League Premiership and 2014 AFC Champions League with the Wanderers, the 2018–19 A-League Premiership with Perth Glory and an Australia Cup with Melbourne Victory in 2022.

Replacing Graham Arnold in 2024, Popovic helped the Socceroos qualify for the 2026 FIFA World Cup, twenty years after his only playing appearance on international football's biggest stage. His sons Kristian and Gabriel are also professional footballers.

== Club career ==
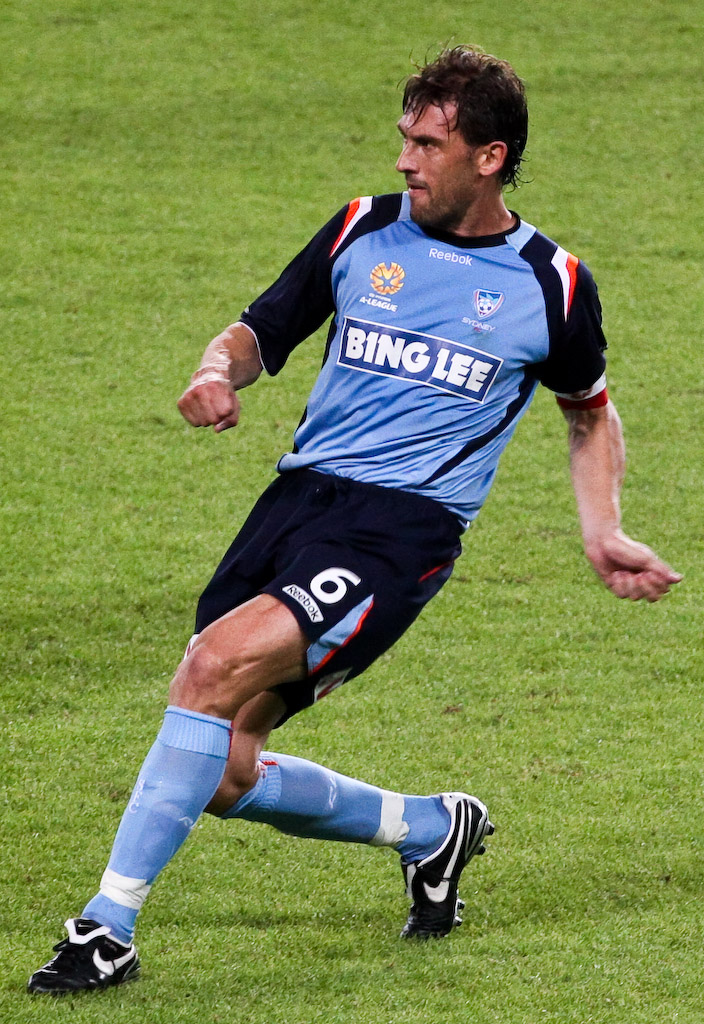
Popovic playing for Sydney FC in 2008

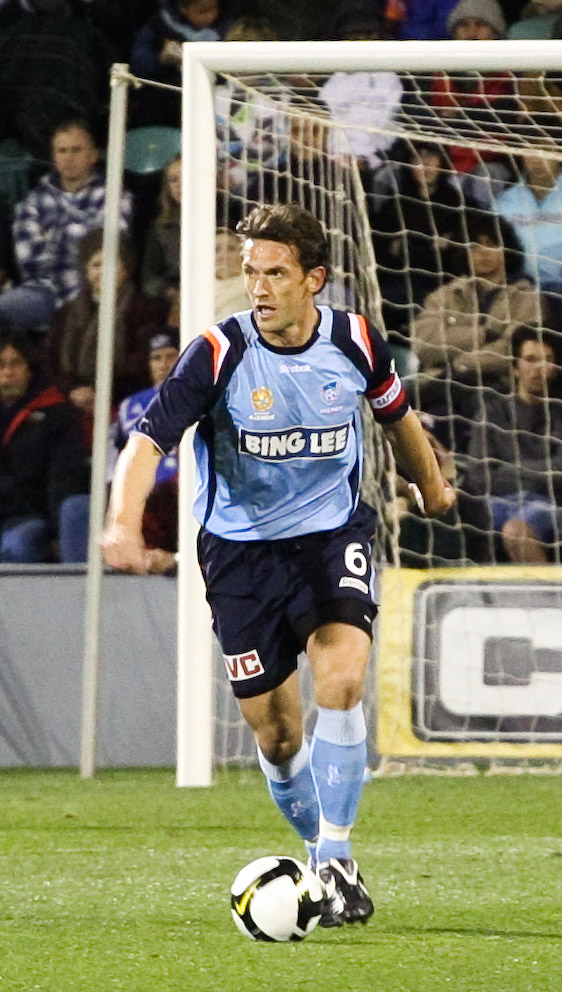
Popovic playing for Sydney FC in 2008

=== Early career ===
Born in Sydney to a Croatian family, Popovic grew up in Fairfield, New South Wales. He began his career with Sydney United 58, making 162 appearances in seven years for the first team before moving to play in the J1 League. Popovic signed with Sanfrecce Hiroshima where he stayed for five years scoring 13 goals in 94 appearances.

=== Crystal Palace ===
Popovic signed for Crystal Palace on a free transfer in August 2001 from Sanfrecce Hiroshima. He became an integral part of the Palace defence, eventually becoming club captain. He played more than 120 matches for Crystal Palace. In his last season he played for Crystal Palace in 21 Premier League matches. In total he made more than 120 appearances for the club.

Popovic's contract with Palace expired at the end of June 2006, and he decided against accepting the club's offer of a new contract. He instead moved to Qatar club, Al-Arabi.

=== Sydney FC ===
In 2007, with the growth of the A-League and slight homesickness, Popovic moved to Sydney FC, signing a two-year deal, with coach Branko Culina also announcing him the club's captain. Popovic scored his first goal on 28 October 2007 from a corner to beat the Mariners 3–2 in front of his home crowd of 17,850.

Popovic announced his retirement on 11 November 2008 after nearly 20 years as a professional footballer.

== International career ==
Popovic competed at the 1992 Summer Olympics in Barcelona for the Australia U23 team. He began his full international career in 1995 with the Australia national team. Over the next eleven years Popovic made 58 appearances for the Socceroos, scoring 8 goals.

The highlight of Popovic's career came in 2006 when the Australian national team qualified for the 2006 FIFA World Cup under the management of Guus Hiddink. He took part in both legs in the qualifying match against Uruguay. After receiving a yellow card early on in the first half of the second leg, Popovic was replaced by Harry Kewell as a part of a tactical move by Hiddink.

The tall defender was named in the competing squad and made his World Cup debut against Brazil on 18 June. He suffered a calf injury 40 minutes into the game and was replaced by Mark Bresciano for the second half. His injury ruled him out of Australia's last match in the group stage, against Croatia, and their second round loss against eventual winners, Italy.

On 4 October 2006, Popovic announced his retirement from the Socceroos.

His final game was a friendly against Paraguay that month. He scored his eighth international goal, from a Mark Bresciano free kick, in his final minute on field to put Australia ahead, 1–0 in a game that finished 1–1.

== Coaching career ==
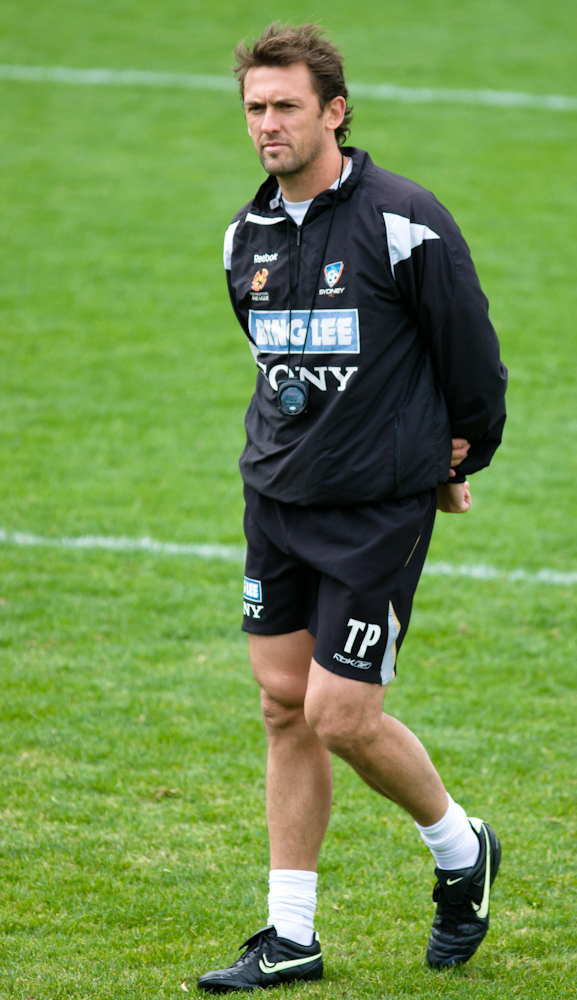
Popovic in 2010

After retiring from football in 2008, Popovic moved into an assistant coach role with Sydney FC. During the 2009–10 season, Sydney completed the Australian domestic double, winning both the A-League Premiership and Championship for the first time in their history. Popovic signed a new contract in March 2010, committing to the club for a further two years. He remained there until February 2011, when he returned to England and to Crystal Palace as first team coach, after former teammate Dougie Freedman was appointed manager.

=== Western Sydney Wanderers ===
On 17 May 2012, Popovic was appointed as the inaugural manager of a Sydney-based A-League club set to begin play in the 2012–13 season. He signed a four-year deal after requesting to be released from the final year of his contract at Crystal Palace. A month later, it was confirmed that the club would be named Western Sydney Wanderers.

After a slow start to their first season, things soon turned positive as Wanderers emerged as one of the leading clubs in Australia. A historic record-breaking season in the league saw the club break an all-time Australian national domestic record and win their first A-League Premiership, topping the table with a record-undefeated streak, which included 10 straight wins. This ensured qualification for the 2014 AFC Champions League as well as a place in the A-League finals series. Wanderers went on to lose 2–0 to Central Coast Mariners in the 2013 A-League Grand Final. Popovic was subsequently named A-League Coach of the Year.

Wanderers failed to retain their Premiership title in the following season, eventually securing second in the league on the final day of the season, 10 points adrift from leaders Brisbane Roar. Popovic guided Wanderers to the 2014 A-League Grand Final, where they lost 2–1 after extra time to Brisbane Roar, who completed an Australian double whilst Wanderers were condemned to a second consecutive Grand Final failure. However, a successful continental campaign saw them defeat Al-Hilal in the 2014 AFC Champions League final, becoming the first Australian team to win the tournament. In recognition of this achievement, Popovic won the AFC Coach of the Year for 2014.

Given his connection to Crystal Palace, Popovic was linked with their vacant managerial position in August 2014 after the departure of Tony Pulis. Popovic dismissed speculation linking him to the role, stating that he had received no contact from the club. After Pulis' successor Neil Warnock was sacked later that year, Popovic was again speculated to fill the role with Wanderers' chairman Paul Lederer saying that he would not stop Popovic from taking charge of Palace. The club eventually appointed Alan Pardew in the position.

With poor recruitment, the departure of assistant coach Ante Milicic and a gruelling schedule of matches, the 2014–15 season saw Wanderers finish ninth in the A-league, avoiding being the basement club by a single point. In the first round of the inaugural season of the FFA Cup, they lost 1–0 to Adelaide City, becoming the first professional club to lose to a semi-professional side in the competition. After their Champions League win, Wanderers represented the Asian Football Confederation at the 2014 FIFA Club World Cup. They lost 3–1 to Mexican club Cruz Azul in the quarter-finals after extra time before being defeated by Algerian side ES Sétif in the fifth place play-off, losing 5–4 on penalties after a 2–2 draw. To add to their disappointment, Wanderers were eliminated from the group stage of the 2015 AFC Champions League. Despite an unfavourable season, Popovic signed a new three-year deal, committing to the club until 2018.

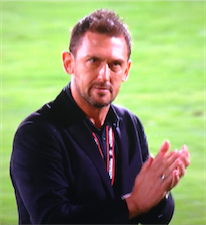
Popovic managing Western Sydney Wanderers in 2016

After a slow start to the 2015–16 season, picking up only 1 point after three matches, Wanderers regained form with a seven-game winning streak, taking them to the top of the league table. They were unable to stay on top of the league however and, after mixed results in the final half of the season, they finished runners-up to Adelaide United, who Wanderers failed to beat in the last few weeks of the season. Wanderers would go on to lose the Finals series to Adelaide, losing 3–1 in the final.

The following season proved to be inconsistent for Wanderers with a disappointing home record contributing to a 6th-placed finish. They only twice resided in the top half of the table all season with a three-game winning streak late in the season being the only time they recorded successive wins. Their Finals series campaign was short-lived, drawing 1–1 against Brisbane Roar which saw them lose 6–5 on penalties. Wanderers finished bottom of Group F in the 2017 AFC Champions League, overseeing two wins though experienced two heavy defeats to Urawa Red Diamonds.

Popovic guided Wanderers to their most successful FFA Cup campaign during the 2017–18 season. Wanderers came back from behind to draw 2–2 against Blacktown City, winning 4–2 on penalties, to advance to the semi-finals for the first time in their history. This would be his final match in charge as he resigned on 1 October 2017 to take charge of Karabükspor.

=== Karabükspor ===
On 1 October 2017, Popovic made a shock announcement that he had resigned from Western Sydney Wanderers to coach Turkish Süper Lig club Karabükspor. It came less than a week out from the start of the 2017–18 A-League season. In his first match in charge, Popovic's side defeated Kayserispor 1–0, moving them out of the relegation zone. Popovic led Karabükspor to the fifth round of the Turkish Cup, where they were defeated by İstanbulspor over two legs.

After nine games, on 15 December 2017, he was sacked by the club and was owed AUD$1.4M compensation. Popovic only managed to win 1 of his 8 Süper Lig games and their recent elimination from the Turkish Cup contributed to his dismissal. The club's entire boardroom quit during his time at the club and after he left, the club went into financial administration, began a relegation freefall and were ultimately dissolved in late 2022.

=== Perth Glory ===
On 11 May 2018, Popovic was confirmed as Perth Glory's new manager following the dismissal of Kenny Lowe at the end of the 2017–18 season. His first game in charge was a pre-season friendly against Premier League club Chelsea, which the Glory lost 0–1. Despite an early exit from the FFA Cup in the round of 32 stage, Popovic's side made an impressive start to the 2018–19 league campaign with an eight-game unbeaten run to take them to the top of the table. After a 1–0 victory over Newcastle Jets, Glory won the A-League Premiership for the first time in their history. Popovic was subsequently named A-League Coach of the Year and PFA A-League Manager of the Season for the second time of his career as a result of their success.

In his second season in charge, Glory once again exited the FFA Cup in the round of 32, losing 2–1 after extra time to Popovic's former side Western Sydney Wanderers. During their only fixture of the 2020 AFC Champions League to take place during their 2019–20 domestic season, which marked Glory's debut in the competition, they were beaten 1–0 by FC Tokyo. On 24 March 2020, the FFA announced that the 2019–20 season would be postponed until further notice due to the COVID-19 pandemic. With the season resuming in July, Glory went on to finish sixth in the A-League. Having narrowly qualified for the Finals series, Glory would go on to reach the semi-finals, where they were defeated 2–0 by Sydney FC.

=== Xanthi ===
On 26 August 2020, Popovic activated a clause in his Perth Glory contract which allowed him to leave for a European team, signing with Super League Greece 2 side Xanthi. The club had recently been acquired by Greek-Australian businessman Bill Papas; Popovic was reunited with his former Western Sydney Wanderers associate Arthur Diles, who had a long-standing relationship with Papas. Xanthi were heavily active in the transfer market with Papas indicating that he wanted the club to become a production line for Australian talent into Europe.

Popovic remained in the role for five months as he was sacked with the club in 5th place and four points from the top. Goalkeeping coach Zeljko Kalac stated later that Popovic was sabotaged and fired due to the owners wanting more control over decisions. Papas would later be accused by Australian banking authorities over an alleged loan fraud scheme that cost multiple banks over $500 million AUD in total.

=== Melbourne Victory ===
On 21 April 2021, Popovic was appointed head coach of Melbourne Victory, who had finished last in the A-League the previous season, on a three-year contract. Popovic's side found early success, defeating Central Coast Mariners 2–1 to claim the 2021 FFA Cup. The club finished second in the A-League, a major improvement in their domestic performance from the previous season, one point behind Melbourne City. Popovic was rewarded with the A-League Coach of the Year accolade for the third time, only Graham Arnold had received the award as many times.

In the lead up to his second season in charge, the club signed former Portuguese international Nani and suddenly emerged as favourites to win the championship. Despite this, they recorded the worst start in their history during the first half of the season, picking up 12 points in 14 matches and sat at the bottom of the ladder. Victory finished the regular season in 11th place, condemning the club to a third bottom two finish in four years and another Australia Cup qualifier. Podcast For Vucks Sake opined that their league campaign was "the worst in the club's history".

The following campaign was much more successful as Popovic guided them to a third-placed finish. After guiding Victory to the 2024 A-League Grand Final, which they lost to the Central Coast Mariners, Popovic left Melbourne Victory at the end of the season. Popovic had reportedly been set to accept a pay cut to remain at the club though it was speculated that he had become infuriated upon discovering John Didulica, who initially lured Popovic to Victory, had been courting the services of Patrick Kisnorbo, catalysing his departure from the club.

=== Australia ===
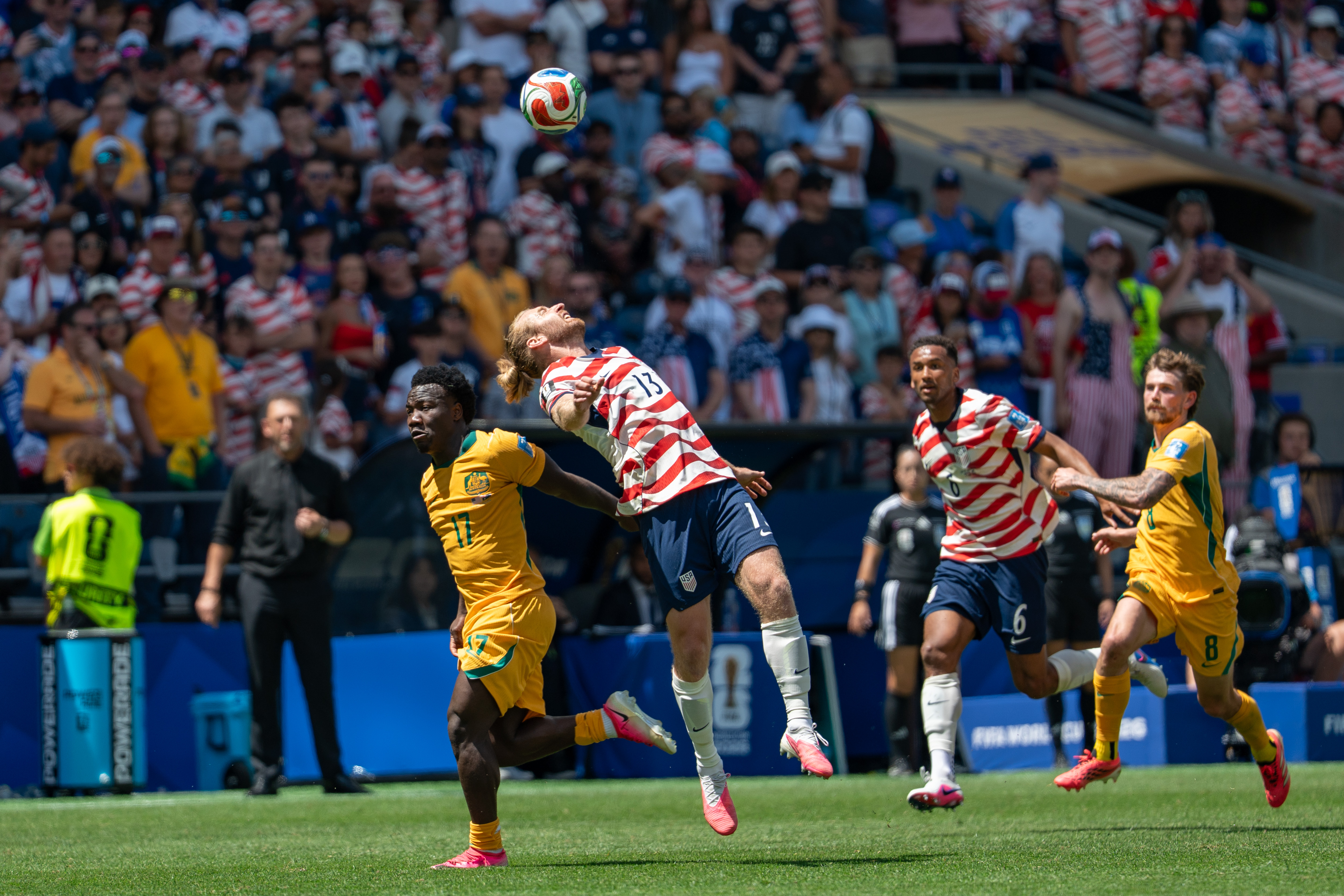
Popovic during Australia v United States at the 2026 FIFA World Cup

On 23 September 2024, Popovic was named as the head coach of the Australian national team, with his appointment effective immediately. Popovic succeeded Graham Arnold, the longest-serving coach in Socceroos history, who resigned with Australia winless in their opening two matches in their 2026 FIFA World Cup qualifiers campaign. Speaking on his appointment, Popovic described it as "a dream come true" and stated, "Five years ago I wasn't ready for this role, three years ago I wouldn't have looked at this. I'm ready".

Popovic named his first 26-man squad for Australia's 2026 FIFA World Cup qualifiers against China and Japan. Massimo Luongo returned to the squad from international retirement whilst Nishan Velupillay, who played under Popovic at Melbourne Victory, received his first call-up. Popovic led the Socceroos to wins over Japan and Saudi Arabia, with Australia eventually ensured direct qualification to the FIFA World Cup for the first time since 2014, marking their sixth consecutive appearance in the tournament.

Australia played their opening match of the 2026 FIFA World Cup against Turkey on 13 June 2026, securing an upset 2–0 victory. Australia were beaten 2–0 by hosts United States, though a goalless draw against Paraguay saw Australia secure second place in Group D, finishing above their opponents on head-to-head goal difference. Facing Egypt in the round of 32 stage, the match finished with a 1–1 draw after extra time, with Australia being knocked out of the tournament 4–2 on penalties.

== Managerial style ==
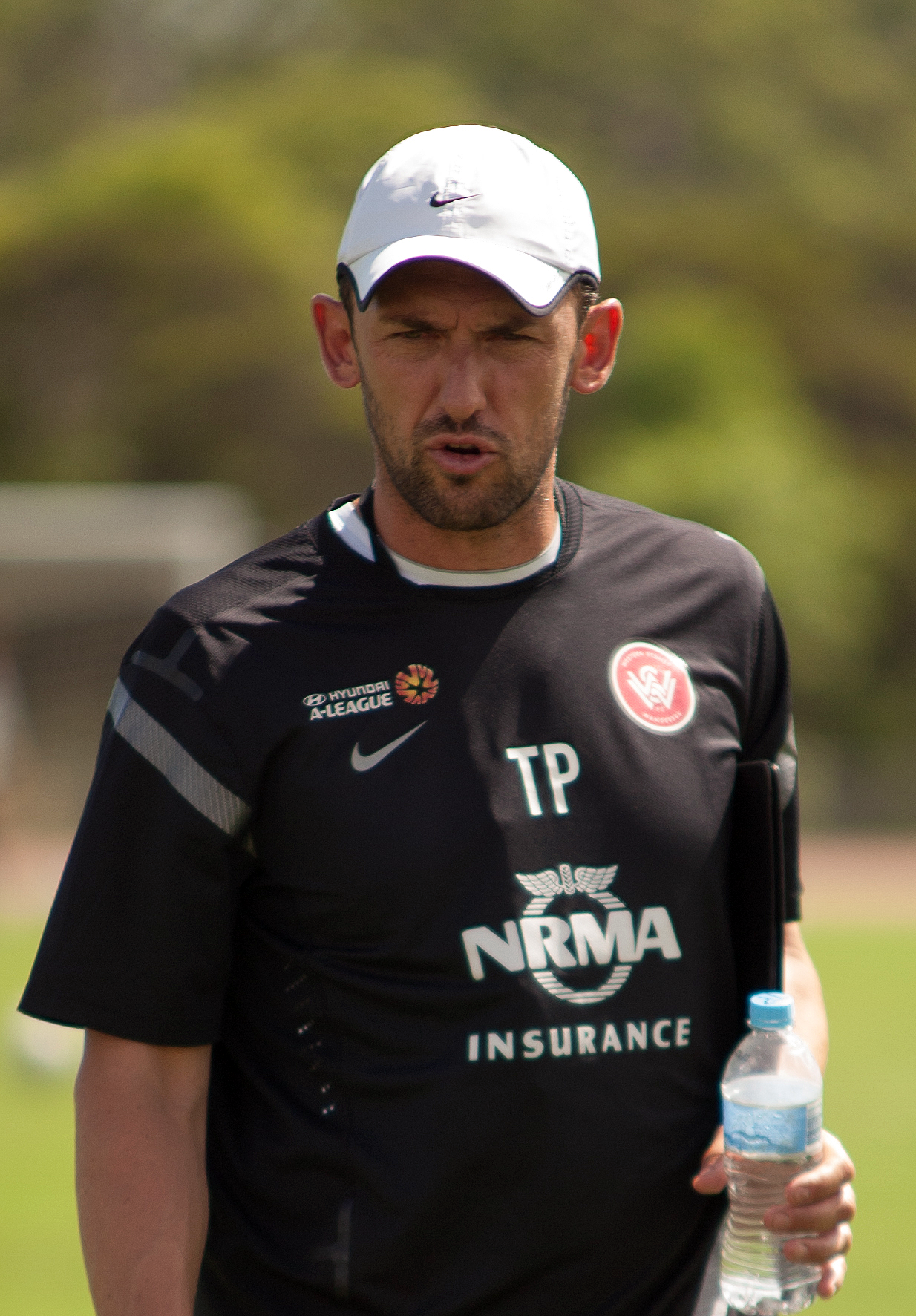
Popovic managing Western Sydney Wanderers in 2013

Popovic frequently favoured a 4–2–3–1 formation, particularly during his tenure at Melbourne Victory. However, as he took over the Australian national team, Popovic utilised a three-man central defensive set-up, fluctuating between a 3–2–4–1 and 3–4–2–1 formation. His approach with Australia implemented two attacking midfielders behind a central striker with wide midfielders or wing-backs operating in the wider channels of play. Popovic has analysed that "formation is just something on paper", emphasising disciplined defensive structure, a compact mid-block and relentless tactical organisation over a rigid system.

His managerial approach combines strict off-field standards with a resilient on-field structure. Popovic demands total commitment in training; poor effort or a bad attitude is not tolerated and players are expected to push past perceived limits. In a documentary produced by Melbourne Victory that documented his first season at the club, Popovic told his players: "I can't handle poor training attitude because that leads to bad performance". Reputation or past club status does not guarantee a place; players must earn their spots through current form, character and tactical fit. His staff monitors microscopic elements of performance, player movement, sleep schedules, travel recovery and strict nutritional guidelines. Gareth Morgan, who was employed as Perth Glory's media manager during Popovic's spell as manager, said Popovic was the most "detail-driven" coach he had worked with, detailing how he closely monitored players' diets and fitness programs.

Popovic's managerial career has drawn influence from his former Australia national team manager Guus Hiddink. Additionally, Popovic spent time observing Carlo Ancelotti at AC Milan, taking note of his measured authority, focus on longevity and tactical structure. Discussing the influence of other managers, Popovic stated, "I'm just trying to do it my way; there are always lessons and people you follow, but I have passion, I have emotion, and I'm just trying to be me and learn from people along the way, and always constantly trying to learn and evolve".

== Career statistics ==
=== Club ===
Appearances and goals by club, season and competition
| Club | Season | League | | | National cup (Note: Includes Emperor's Cup, FA Cup, Emir Cup.) | | League cup (Note: Includes J.League Cup, League Cup, Sheikh Jassem Cup.) | | Total | |
| Club | Season | Division | Apps | Goals | Apps | Goals | Apps | Goals | Apps | Goals |
|---|---|---|---|---|---|---|---|---|---|---|
| Sydney United (Note: "Sydney Croatia" until 1993) | 1989–90 | National Soccer League | 13 | 0 | | | | | 13 | 0 |
| Sydney United | 1990–91 | National Soccer League | 17 | 1 | | | | | 17 | 1 |
| Sydney United | 1991–92 | National Soccer League | 20 | 1 | | | | | 20 | 1 |
| Sydney United | 1992–93 | National Soccer League | 24 | 2 | | | | | 24 | 2 |
| Sydney United | 1993–94 | National Soccer League | 27 | 2 | | | | | 27 | 2 |
| Sydney United | 1994–95 | National Soccer League | 25 | 3 | | | | | 25 | 3 |
| Sydney United | 1995–96 | National Soccer League | 29 | 4 | | | | | 29 | 4 |
| Sydney United | 1996–97 | National Soccer League | 7 | 2 | | | | | 7 | 2 |
| Sydney United | Total | | 162 | 15 | | | | | 162 | 15 |
| Sanfrecce Hiroshima | 1997 | J1 League | 11 | 0 | 0 | 0 | 6 | 0 | 17 | 0 |
| Sanfrecce Hiroshima | 1998 | J1 League | 25 | 4 | 3 | 1 | 2 | 1 | 30 | 6 |
| Sanfrecce Hiroshima | 1999 | J1 League | 23 | 6 | 5 | 0 | 1 | 0 | 29 | 6 |
| Sanfrecce Hiroshima | 2000 | J1 League | 21 | 3 | 2 | 0 | 3 | 2 | 26 | 5 |
| Sanfrecce Hiroshima | 2001 | J1 League | 7 | 0 | 0 | 0 | 0 | 0 | 7 | 0 |
| Sanfrecce Hiroshima | Total | | 87 | 13 | 10 | 1 | 12 | 3 | 109 | 17 |
| Crystal Palace | 2001–02 | First Division | 20 | 2 | 1 | 0 | | | 21 | 2 |
| Crystal Palace | 2002–03 | First Division | 36 | 4 | 3 | 0 | | | 40 | 4 |
| Crystal Palace | 2003–04 | First Division | 30 | 1 | 1 | 0 | | | 31 | 1 |
| Crystal Palace | 2004–05 | Premier League | 23 | 0 | | | | | 23 | 0 |
| Crystal Palace | 2005–06 | League Championship | 12 | 0 | 2 | 0 | 1 | 0 | 15 | 0 |
| Crystal Palace | Total | | 119 | 7 | 5 | 0 | | | 119 | 7 |
| Al-Arabi | 2006–07 | Qatar Stars League | 17 | 2 | | | | | 17 | 2 |
| Sydney FC | 2007–08 | A-League | 20 | 1 | | | | | 20 | 1 |
| Sydney FC | 2008–09 | A-League | 7 | 0 | | | | | 7 | 0 |
| Sydney FC | Total | | 27 | 1 | | | | | 27 | 1 |
| Career total | | | 412 | 38 | 15 | 1 | 12 | 3 | 439 | 42 |

=== International ===
Appearances and goals by national team and year
| National team | Year | Apps | Goals |
|---|---|---|---|
| Australia | 1995 | 8 | 0 |
| Australia | 1996 | 10 | 0 |
| Australia | 1997 | 2 | 0 |
| Australia | 1998 | 2 | 0 |
| Australia | 1999 | 0 | 0 |
| Australia | 2000 | 7 | 1 |
| Australia | 2001 | 10 | 5 |
| Australia | 2002 | 0 | 0 |
| Australia | 2003 | 2 | 1 |
| Australia | 2004 | 5 | 0 |
| Australia | 2005 | 8 | 0 |
| Australia | 2006 | 4 | 1 |
| Total | | 58 | 8 |

Scores and results list Australia's goal tally first, score column indicates score after each Popovic goal.

List of international goals scored by Tony Popovic
| No. | Date | Venue | Opponent | Score | Result | Competition |
|---|---|---|---|---|---|---|
| 1 | 19 June 2000 | Stade Pater Te Hono Nui, Papeete, Tahiti | Cook Islands | 10–0 | 17–0 | 2000 OFC Nations Cup |
| 2 | 9 April 2001 | BCU International Stadium, Australia | Tonga | 15–0 | 22–0 | 2002 FIFA World Cup qualification |
| 3 | 11 April 2001 | BCU International Stadium, Australia | American Samoa | 5–0 | 31–0 | 2002 FIFA World Cup qualification |
| 4 | 11 April 2001 | BCU International Stadium, Australia | American Samoa | 6–0 | 31–0 | 2002 FIFA World Cup qualification |
| 5 | 16 April 2001 | BCU International Stadium, Australia | Samoa | 5–0 | 11–0 | 2002 FIFA World Cup qualification |
| 6 | 16 April 2001 | BCU International Stadium, Australia | Samoa | 11–0 | 11–0 | 2002 FIFA World Cup qualification |
| 7 | 12 February 2003 | Boleyn Ground, London, England | England | 1–0 | 3–1 | Friendly |
| 8 | 7 September 2006 | Suncorp Stadium, Brisbane, Australia | Paraguay | 1–0 | 1–1 | Friendly |

== Managerial statistics ==
As of match played 17 November 2026

Managerial record by team and tenure
| Team | Nat. | From | To | Record | | | | | Ref. |
| Team | Nat. | From | To | G | W | D | L | Win % | Ref. |
|---|---|---|---|---|---|---|---|---|---|
| Western Sydney Wanderers | (Australia) | 17 May 2012 | 1 October 2017 | 180 | 77 | 40 | 63 | 42.78 | |
| Karabükspor | (Turkey) | 1 October 2017 | 15 December 2017 | 11 | 3 | 0 | 8 | 27.27 | |
| Perth Glory | (Australia) | 11 May 2018 | 2 September 2020 | 60 | 30 | 13 | 17 | 50.00 | |
| Xanthi | (Greece) | 2 September 2020 | 22 February 2021 | 9 | 4 | 3 | 2 | 44.44 | |
| Melbourne Victory | (Australia) | 21 April 2021 | 12 June 2024 | 94 | 40 | 26 | 28 | 42.55 | |
| Australia | (Australia) | 23 September 2024 | Present | 26 | 12 | 7 | 7 | 46.15 | |
| Career Total | | | | 380 | 166 | 89 | 125 | 43.68 | |

== Honours ==
=== Player ===
Crystal Palace

- Football League Championship play-offs: 2004

Australia

- FIFA Confederations Cup third place: 2001
- OFC Nations Cup: 1996, 2000

=== Manager ===
Western Sydney Wanderers

- A-League Men: Premiers 2012–13; runner-up 2013–14, 2015–16
- A-League Men Finals runner-up: 2013, 2014, 2016
- AFC Champions League: 2014

Perth Glory

- A-League Men: Premiers 2018–19
- A-League Men Finals runner-up: 2019

Melbourne Victory

- A-League Men Regular Season runner-up: 2021–22
- A-League Men Finals runner-up: 2024
- Australia Cup: 2021

Assistant Coach for Sydney FC

- A-League Premiership: 2009–10
- A-League Championship: 2009–10

=== Individual ===
- A-League Men Coach of the Year: 2012–13, 2018–19, 2021–22
- PFA A-League Manager of the Season: 2012–13, 2018–19
- AFC Coach of the Year: 2014
