= Ante Milicic =

Australian soccer manager (born 1974)

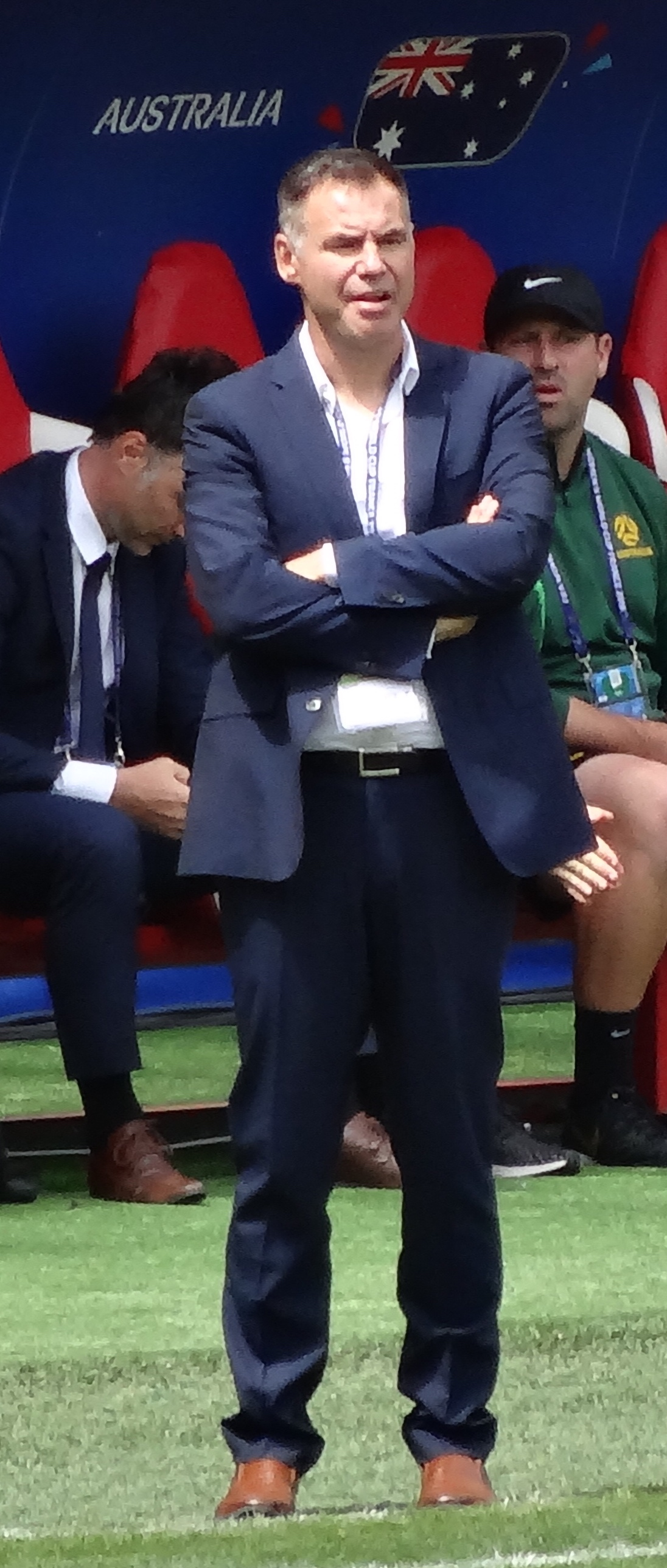
- Milicic in 2019

Personal information
- Date of birth: 4 April 1974 (age 52)
- Place of birth: Sydney, New South Wales, Australia
- Position: Forward

Youth career
- Sydney United
- Hurstville ZFC
- 1990–1991: AIS

Senior career*
Years	Team	Apps	(Gls)
1992–1993	Sydney United	6	(1)
1993	Canberra Deakin	13	(6)
1993–1997	Sydney United	114	(39)
1997–1999	NAC Breda	47	(10)
1999–2001	NK Rijeka	51	(15)
2001–2002	Sydney United	14	(8)
2002–2003	Sydney Olympic	39	(30)
2003–2004	Parramatta Power	26	(20)
2004	Pahang	11	(9)
2004–2005	Sydney United		
2005–2006	Newcastle Jets	20	(7)
2006–2008	Queensland Roar	24	(4)
2008	Shahzan Muda		(10)
2009	Sydney United		
2010	Dandenong City		(7)

International career
- Australia U20
- Australia U23
2002–2005	Australia	6	(5)

Managerial career
- 2009: Sydney United
- 2010–2012: Melbourne Heart (assistant)
- 2012–2014: Western Sydney Wanderers (assistant)
- 2014–2018: Australia (assistant)
- 2017–2018: Australia U23
- 2018–2019: Australia U23 (assistant)
- 2018–2019: Australia U20
- 2019–2020: Australia Women
- 2020–2022: Macarthur FC
- 2024–2026: China Women
- * Club domestic league appearances and goals

Ante Milicic (/ˈænteɪ ˈmɪlətʃɪtʃ/ AN-tay MIL-ə-chitch; Croatian: Ante Miličić [ǎːnte mîlitʃitɕ]; (born 4 April 1974) is an Australian soccer manager and former professional player.

== Personal life ==
The son of Croatian immigrants, Milicic grew up in Strathfield, a suburb in the Inner West of Sydney. Milicic was largely brought up by his father after his mother died when he was 17. At 16, he was selected to train at the Australian Institute of Sport.

== Playing career ==
Milicic played for a variety of sides in two stints in the National Soccer League (NSL). The first stint was played almost entirely for Sydney United, for whom he played as a junior, and which culminated in playing in their runner-up 1996–97 side. After that season he moved to NAC Breda in the Netherlands, and after two seasons there went to Croatia's NK Rijeka, where he was the club's top scorer in 2000–01 with 10 goals. On his return to the NSL in season 2001–02, he rejoined Sydney United for a brief stay, before moving to city rival Sydney Olympic during the same season. He would spend the rest of the season and the next playing there, including scoring the only goal of the 2001–02 Grand Final against Perth Glory. In the final he was awarded the Joe Marston Medal, delivering Sydney Olympic their second NSL title, as well as playing in the runner up side the following season against Perth Glory.

In the last season of the NSL in 2003–04 season, he moved to Parramatta Power, where he would again experience Grand Final defeat against the Perth Glory. After the NSL was disbanded, Milicic played in the Malaysia Super League for Pahang. He score a brace for Pahang in his debut against Perlis. He scored nine goals for Pahang as they were crowned as the league champions of the 2004 season. It was widely felt that with the $1.5 million salary caps imposed on all A-League clubs, Milicic would not be able to be brought back to Australia. However, he joined the Newcastle United Jets, who finished 4th on the A-League ladder in 2005–06, also joining close friends Labinot Haliti, Ned Zelic.

Milicic was the first player in the A-League to score a hat-trick in the game Newcastle Jets v New Zealand Knights on 4 November 2005 in round 11. In May 2006 Ante signed to transfer to rival A-League team Queensland Roar, where he played in 44 matches scoring 11 goals. On 8 December 2007, Milicic had his contract terminated by mutual consent and joining Malaysian Premier League Shahzan Muda FC, citing that "It wasn't quite happening for me at Queensland Roar."

== Coaching career ==
Milicic returned home to his club Sydney United as player-coach for season 2009 and 2010 in the NSW Premier League. It is his first venture as coach and currently boasts a record of nine wins (eight in Premier, League one Tiger Turf Cup), two draws and one loss.

He was also called up as an assistant coach to the Australia men's national under-20 soccer team for the 2009 FIFA U-20 World Cup in Egypt and 2011 Under 20s World Cup in Colombia.

On 18 November 2009, it was announced that he would be joining Jesper Olsen as an assistant coach at new A-League side Melbourne Heart.

After being passed over for the vacant manager position at Melbourne Heart, he joined his close friend Tony Popovic as the inaugural assistant coach of Western Sydney Wanderers FC.

At the end of the 2013–14 A-League season, Milicic joined Ange Postecoglou as assistant coach of Australia's men’s national football team, the Socceroos.

On 18 February 2019, Milicic was announced by the FFA as the interim head coach of the Australia women's national team, the Matildas, managing the Matildas to a round of 16 finish at the 2019 FIFA Women's World Cup. He resigned from this position on 19 July 2020.

On 15 May 2019, Milicic was announced as the inaugural head coach for new A-League club Macarthur FC. He began following his spell with the Matildas.

After two seasons with Macarthur, on 26 April 2022, Milicic informed the club that the 2021–22 season would be his last, choosing to return to Croatia for family reasons.

On 11 May 2024, Milicic was appointed as the head coach of China Women. On 23 October 2026, Milicic was sacked by Chinese Football Association.

== Playing statistics ==
Australia national team
Year	Apps	Goals
2002	2	1
2003	0	0
2004	3	2
2005	1	2
Total	6	5

No.	Date	Venue	Opponent	Score	Result	Competition
1.	10 July 2002	Auckland, New Zealand	Fiji	1–0	8–0	2002 OFC Nations Cup
2.	9 October 2004	Honiara, Solomon Islands	Solomon Islands	2–0	5–1	2004 OFC Nations Cup
3.	12 October 2004	Sydney, Australia	Solomon Islands	1–0	6–0	2004 OFC Nations Cup
4.	29 March 2005	Perth, Australia	Indonesia	1–0	3–0	Friendly
5.	29 March 2005	Perth, Australia	Indonesia	2–0	3–0	Friendly

== Managerial statistics ==
As of 18 May 2022

Team	From	To	Record				
Team	From	To	G	W	D	L	Win %
Australia women's	2019	2020	16	11	2	3	68.75
Macarthur	2020	2022	56	22	12	22	39.29
Total			72	33	14	25	45.83

== Honours ==
With Australia:

- OFC Nations Cup: 2004

With Sydney Olympic:

- NSL Championship: 2001–02

With Pahang:

- Malaysia Super League: 2004

Personal honours:

- Joe Marston Medal: 2001–2002 with Sydney Olympic
- Johnny Warren Medal: 2003–2004 with Parramatta Power
- NSL Top Scorer: 2003–2004 with Parramatta Power – 20 goals
