= 2000–01 Sydney United FC season =

Sydney United 58 FC
2000–01 season
- Chairman: Marko Franović
- Manager: Alan Hunter (Round 1-13) & Velimir Kuprešak (Round 14-30)
- Stadium: Sydney United Sports Centre
- National Soccer League: 10th (League)
- Top goalscorer: Commins Menapi (8)
- Highest home attendance: 6,825 vs. Marconi Stallions (4 October 2000); National Soccer League
- Lowest home attendance: 2,230 vs. South Melbourne (12 March 2001); National Soccer League
- Average home league attendance: 3,593
- Biggest win: 2–0 vs. Adelaide City Force (20 October 2000); National Soccer League
- Biggest defeat: 0–4 vs. Melbourne Knights (19 November 2000); National Soccer League; 1–5 vs. Perth Glory (10 February 2001); National Soccer League

The 2000–01 season marked Sydney United's eighteenth campaign in the NSL. The team finished in 10th place, missing out on the final series for a second consecutive season.

Following a disappointing 1999–2000, Sydney United appointed former player Alan Hunter as head coach in an effort to revitalize the squad, along with key signings including former Australian internationals Francis Awaritefe and Zlatko Arambašić.

The season began on a promising note, with United securing victories in their first three matches. However, a challenging period followed, as the team remained winless for the next ten games, leading to Hunter's departure. Velimir Kuprešak took over as player-coach, and while results improved under his leadership, United ultimately fell short of a finals berth.

Additionally, the campaign marked the conclusion of Velimir Kuprešak's distinguished tenure at the club, as he retired at the end of the season, having been with Sydney United since 1989.

A standout moment of the season was the guest appearance of Croatian international Aljoša Asanović, who featured in the final two matches, scoring one goal.

== Players ==
Note: Flags indicate national team as defined under FIFA eligibility rules; some limited exceptions apply. Players may hold more than one non-FIFA nationality.

No.	Pos.	Nation	Player
1	GK	AUS	Brett Hughes
2	DF	AUS	Elvis Olic
3	MF	AUS	Danny Burt
4	DF	AUS	Velimir Kuprešak
5	MF	AUS	Richard Plesa (Captain)
6	MF	AUS	Vince Savoca
7	DF	AUS	Raymond Younis
8	MF	AUS	Paul Bilokapic
9	FW	AUS	Zlatko Arambašić
10	MF	AUS	Nahuel Arrarte
11	MF	AUS	Tom Pondeljak
12	DF	AUS	Tom Maric
13	MF	AUS	Ante Deur
14	MF	AUS	Kain Rastall
15	MF	AUS	Aytek Genc (Captain)
16	FW	SOL	Commins Menapi
17	FW	AUS	Francis Awaritefe

No.	Pos.	Nation	Player
18	MF	AUS	Goran Talevski
19	DF	AUS	Shane Webb
20	GK	AUS	Steve Tolios
21	MF	AUS	Terry Palapanis
22	FW	SOL	Akwasi Ageyi
23	MF	AUS	Steve Jordan
24	MF	AUS	Milan Bosnar
25	MF	AUS	Matthew Jedinak
26	MF	AUS	Mile Jedinak
27	MF	AUS	Daniel Willoughby
28	DF	AUS	Allan Picken
29	FW	AUS	Matthew Zec
37	MF	CRO	Aljoša Asanović
—	MF	AUS	Matthew Clowes
—	DF	AUS	Damien Foxe
—	FW	AUS	Mark Silic

=== Transfers in ===
No.	Pos.	Nat.	Name	Age	Moving from	Type	Transfer window	Ends	Transfer fee	Source
17	FW	(Australia)	Francis Awaritefe	36	Marconi Stallions (Australia)	Transfer	Pre-season		Undisclosed	
9	FW	(Australia)	Zlatko Arambašić	31	Sydney Olympic (Australia)	Transfer	Pre-season		Undisclosed	
5	MF	(Australia)	Richard Plesa	24	Parramatta Power (Australia)	Transfer	Pre-season		Undisclosed	
8	MF	(Australia)	Mark Silic	28	Melbourne Knights (Australia)	Transfer	Pre-season		Undisclosed	
16	FW	(Australia)	Commins Menapi	23	Nelson Suburbs FC (New Zealand)	Transfer	Pre-season		Undisclosed	
3	DF	(Australia)	Danny Burt	27	Canberra Cosmos (Australia)	Transfer	Pre-season		Undisclosed	
19	DF	(Australia)	Shane Webb	20	Manly Warringah Dolphins (Australia)	Transfer	Pre-season		Undisclosed	
2	DF	(Australia)	Damien Foxe	26	Blacktown City (Australia)	Transfer	Pre-season		Undisclosed	
28	DF	(Australia)	Allan Picken	19	Penrith Panthers FC (Australia)	Transfer	Pre-season		Undisclosed	

=== Transfers out ===
No.	Pos.	Nat.	Name	Age	Moving to	Type	Transfer window	Transfer fee	Source
5	DF	(Australia)	Eddy Bosnar	20	Dinamo Zagreb (Croatia)	Transfer	Pre-season	Undisclosed	
17	FW	(Australia)	Nick Bosevski	23	RFC Liège (Belgium)	Transfer	Pre-season	Undisclosed	
10	MF	(Australia)	Ante Moric	26	Sydney Olympic (Australia)	End of Contract	Pre-season	Free	
24	MF	(Australia)	Andy Rakic	19	Canberra Cosmos (Australia)	End of Contract	Pre-season	Free	
7	MF	(Australia)	Mirko Jurilj	26	Sembawang Rangers (Singapore)	End of Contract	Pre-season	Free	
25	MF	(Australia)	Ante Deak	22	Eastern Pride (Australia)	End of Contract	Pre-season	Free	
1	GK	(Australia)	John Crawley	28	Blacktown City FC (Australia)	End of Contract	Pre-season	Free	
3	DF	(Australia)	Mark Racker	23	Blacktown City FC (Australia)	End of Contract	Pre-season	Free	
21	FW	(Australia)	Zvonko Ušljebrka	27	Port Kembla FC (Australia)	End of Contract	Pre-season	Free	
18	MF	(Australia)	Steven Bozinovski	19	Rockdale City Suns (Australia)	End of Contract	Pre-season	Free	
26	FW	(Australia)	Fernando Pellegrino	20	Canterbury Marrickville FC (Australia)	End of Contract	Pre-season	Free	
22	DF	(Australia)	Colin Luff	25	Bonnyrigg White Eagles (Australia)	End of Contract	Pre-season	Free	
19	FW	(Australia)	Grgo Saric	21	Free agent	End of Contract	Pre-season	Free	

=== Mid-Season Gains ===
No.	Pos.	Nat.	Name	Age	Moving from	Type	Transfer window	Ends	Transfer fee	Source
8	MF	(Australia)	Paul Bilokapic	24	Northern Spirit (Australia)	Transfer	Mid-season		Undisclosed	
37	MF	(Croatia)	Aljoša Asanović	35	Free agent	Guest Contract	Mid-season	April 30	Free	

=== Mid-Season Losses ===
No.	Pos.	Nat.	Name	Age	Moving to	Type	Transfer window	Transfer fee	Source
2	DF	(Australia)	Damien Foxe	26	Blacktown City FC (Australia)	Transfer	Mid-season	Undisclosed	

== Competitions ==
=== Overview ===
Competition	First match	Last match	Starting round	Final position	Record							
Competition	First match	Last match	Starting round	Final position	Pld	W	D	L	GF	GA	GD	Win %
National Soccer League	15 October 2000	29 April 2001	Matchday 1	10th	30	12	6	12	46	56	−10	40.00
Total					30	12	6	12	46	56	−10	40.00

Last updated: complete
Source: Competitions

=== National Soccer League ===
==== League table ====
Pos	Team	Pld	W	D	L	GF	GA	GD	Pts
8	Football Kingz	30	12	7	11	52	52	0	43
9	Parramatta Power	30	13	3	14	42	44	−2	42
10	Sydney United	30	12	6	12	46	56	−10	42
11	Canberra Cosmos	30	11	4	15	49	55	−6	37
12	Brisbane Strikers	30	9	8	13	52	56	−4	35

Source: rsssf.com
Rules for classification: 1) Points; 2) Goal difference; 3) Goals scored

==== Results summary ====
Overall								Home						Away					
Pld	W	D	L	GF	GA	GD	Pts	W	D	L	GF	GA	GD	W	D	L	GF	GA	GD
30	12	6	12	47	55	−8	42	8	4	4	27	23	+4	4	2	8	20	32	−12

==== Matches ====
15 October 2000 1	Sydney United	2–1	Northern Spirit	Edensor Park, New South Wales
	Arambašić 73', 88'	Report	Langdon 5'	Stadium: Sydney United Sports Centre; Attendance: 4,958; Referee: Craig Zetter

20 October 2000 2	Adelaide City Force	0–2	Sydney United	Hindmarsh, South Australia
		Report	Awaritefe 17', 28'	Stadium: Hindmarsh Stadium; Attendance: 3,467; Referee: Angelo Nardi

31 October 2001 3	Sydney United	2–1	Perth Glory	Edensor Park, New South Wales
	Arambašić 3'; Awaritefe 74'	Report	Harnwell 28'	Stadium: Sydney United Sports Centre; Attendance: 5,483

5 November 2000 4	Carlton SC	0–3 (awarded on walkover)	Sydney United	Albert Park, Victoria
	Thompson 25', 42 (pen)'; Motsiopoulos 55'; Colosimo 86'	Report		Stadium: Bob Jane Stadium; Attendance: 1,652; Referee: P.Mur

12 November 2000 5	Sydney United	2–2	Marconi Stallions	Edensor Park, New South Wales
	Pondeljak 49'; Genc 80'	Report	Bove 50'; Farah 73'	Stadium: Sydney United Sports Centre; Attendance: 6,825; Referee: Simon Micallef

19 November 2000 6	Melbourne Knights	4–0	Sydney United	Sunshine North, Victoria
	A.Vargas 13'; Da Costa 25'; Porter 50'; Kiratzoglou 65'	Report		Stadium: Knights Stadium; Attendance: 5,180; Referee: Con Diomis

26 November 2000 7	Sydney United	1–1	Brisbane Strikers	Edensor Park, New South Wales
	Deur 47'	Report	Foster 69'	Stadium: Sydney United Sports Centre; Attendance: 3,875; Referee: Neil Fox

1 December 2000 8	Parramatta Power	3–2	Sydney United	Parramatta, New South Wales
	Thorp 34'; Miller 41', 44'	Report	Menapi 62'; Pondeljak 66' (pen)	Stadium: Parramatta Stadium; Attendance: 2,021; Referee: Mark Shield

10 December 2000 9	Sydney United	2–2	Canberra Cosmos	Edensor Park, New South Wales
	Deur 66'; Menapi 90+3'	Report	Castro 5'; Popovich 90+4'	Stadium: Sydney United Sports Centre; Attendance: 3,254; Referee: Shaun Micallef

16 December 2000 10	Wollongong Wolves	2–0	Sydney United	Wollongong, New South Wales
	Petrovski 49'; Ceccoli 80'	Report		Stadium: WIN Stadium; Attendance: 3,339; Referee: Gerry Connolly

23 December 2000 11	Sydney United	0–3	South Melbourne	Edensor Park, New South Wales
		Report	Vlahos 27'; Coveny 41'; Susa 78'	Stadium: Sydney Croatian Sports Centre; Attendance: 2,230; Referee: Mark Shield

29 December 2000 12	Newcastle United	1–1	Sydney United	Newcastle, New South Wales
	Buonavoglia 52' (pen)	Report	Sprod (og) 89'	Stadium: Breakers Stadium; Attendance: 8,305; Referee: Matthew Breeze

7 January 2001 13	Sydney Olympic	3–1	Sydney United	Belmore, New South Wales
	Augerinos 70'; Collina 88'; Parisi 90+2'	Report	Arambašić 41'	Stadium: Belmore Sports Ground; Attendance: 4,462; Referee: Shaun Michallef

14 January 2001 14	Sydney United	1–0	Eastern Pride	Edensor Park, New South Wales
	Deur 58'	Report		Stadium: Sydney United Sports Centre; Attendance: 2,312; Referee: J.Blaney

19 January 2001 15	Football Kingz	1–1	Sydney United	Wellington, New Zealand
	Ibrahim 52'	Report	Awaritefe 18'	Stadium: Westpac Trust Stadium; Attendance: 11,622; Referee: P.Mur

26 January 2001 16	Northern Spirit	1–2	Sydney United	North Sydney, New South Wales
	Burgess 27'	Report	Arambašić 35'; Burt 55'	Stadium: North Sydney Oval; Attendance: 3,731; Referee: Shaun Micallef

4 February 2001 17	Sydney United	2–1	Adelaide Force	Edensor Park, New South Wales
	Menapi 28', 48'	Report	Tunbridge 69'	Stadium: Sydney United Sports Centre; Attendance: 2,754; Referee: Eddie Lennie

10 February 2001 18	Perth Glory	5–1	Sydney United	Perth, Western Australia
	Miller 33'; Despotovski 37 (pen)', 40'; Naven 44'; Mori 55'	Report	Pondeljak 67'	Stadium: Perth Oval; Attendance: 13,278; Referee: Gerry Connelly

19	Sydney United	3–0 (awarded on walkover)	Carlton SC	Edensor Park, New South Wales
		Report		Stadium: Sydney United Sports Centre

23 February 2001 20	Marconi Stallions	5–2	Sydney United	Bossley Park, New South Wales
	J.Gibson 22'; Trajanovski 56'; Thompson 60', 68'; Brownlie 90+3'	Report	Awaritefe 1'; Pondeljak 64'	Stadium: Marconi Stadium; Attendance: 5,420; Referee: Matthew Breeze

4 March 2001 21	Sydney United	0–1	Melbourne Knights	Edensor Park, New South Wales
		Report	Porter 42'	Stadium: Sydney United Sports Centre; Attendance: 4,218; Referee: Craig Zetter

11 March 2001 22	Brisbane Strikers	4–2	Sydney United	Herston, Queensland
	Harris 23'; Pilic 49'; Foster 71 (pen)', 90+2'	Report	Bilokapic 41'; Ageyi 90+3'	Stadium: Ballymore Oval; Attendance: 1,643; Referee: Peter Green

18 March 2001 23	Sydney United	2–1	Parramatta Power	Edensor Park, New South Wales
	Menapi 49', 75'	Report	Thompson 23'	Stadium: Sydney United Sports Centre; Attendance: 3,860; Referee: Mark Shield

23 March 2001 24	Canberra Cosmos	1–2	Sydney United	Canberra, Australian Capital Territory
	Cortes 71'	Report	Menapi 5'; Awaritefe 51'	Stadium: Bruce Stadium; Attendance: 2,763; Referee: Peter Green

1 April 2001 25	Sydney United	1–1	Wollongong Wolves	Edensor Park, New South Wales
	Talevski 76'	Report	Huxley 50'	Stadium: Sydney United Sports Centre; Attendance: 4,235; Referee: Con Diomis

4 April 2001 Round 26	South Melbourne	3–1	Sydney United	Albert Park, Victoria
	Vlahos 6'; Boutsianis 42'; Kalogeracos 48'	Report	Menapi 52'	Stadium: Bob Jane Stadium; Attendance: 5,025; Referee: Gerry Connelly

16 April 2001 Round 27	Sydney United	0–3	Newcastle United	Edensor Park, New South Wales
		Report	Buonavoglia 34 (pen)', 85'; Tsekenis 51'	Stadium: Sydney United Sports Centre; Attendance: 2,638; Referee: Matthew Breeze

22 April 2001 Round 28	Sydney United	3–2	Sydney Olympic	Edensor Park, New South Wales
	Collina (og) 18'; Awaritefe 44'; Arambašić 68'	Report	Cardozo 16', 41'	Stadium: Sydney United Sports Centre; Attendance: 5,124; Referee: Eddie Lennie

Round 29	Sydney United	3–0 (awarded on forfeit)	Eastern Pride	Edensor Park, New South Wales
		Report		Stadium: Sydney United Sports Centre

29 April 2001 Round 30	Sydney United	2–4	Football Kingz	Edensor Park, New South Wales
	Asanović 37 (pen)'; Menapi 45'	Report	Ibrahim 5', 15', 20'; Perry 46'	Stadium: Sydney United Sports Centre; Attendance: 5,450; Referee: Mark Shield

== Statistics ==
=== Appearances and goals ===
Players with no appearances not included in the list.

No.	Pos.	Nat.	Name	National Soccer League		Total	
No.	Pos.	Nat.	Name	Apps	Goals	Apps	Goals
1	GK	(Australia)	Brett Hughes	19	0	19	0
2	DF	(Australia)	Elvis Olic	10	0	10	0
3	DF	(Australia)	Danny Burt	21	1	21	1
4	DF	(Australia)	Velimir Kuprešak	2	0	2	0
5	MF	(Australia)	Richard Plesa	24	0	24	0
6	MF	(Australia)	Vince Savoca	6	0	6	0
7	DF	(Australia)	Raymond Younis	8	0	8	0
8	MF	(Australia)	Paul Bilokapic	6	1	6	1
9	FW	(Australia)	Zlatko Arambašić	19	6	19	6
10	MF	(Australia)	Nahuel Arrarte	23	0	23	0
11	MF	(Australia)	Tom Pondeljak	26	4	26	4
12	DF	(Australia)	Tom Maric	19	0	19	0
13	MF	(Australia)	Ante Deur	21	3	21	3
14	MF	(Australia)	Kain Rastall	19	0	19	0
15	MF	(Australia)	Aytek Genc	22	1	22	1
16	FW	(Solomon Islands)	Commins Menapi	28	9	28	9
17	FW	(Australia)	Francis Awaritefe	22	7	22	7
18	MF	(Australia)	Goran Talevski	19	1	19	1
19	DF	(Australia)	Shane Webb	20	0	20	0
20	GK	(Australia)	Steve Tolios	11	0	11	0
21	MF	(Australia)	Terry Palapanis	13	0	13	0
22	FW	(Solomon Islands)	Akwasi Ageyi	2	1	2	1
23	MF	(Australia)	Steve Jordan	1	0	1	0
24	MF	(Australia)	Milan Bosnar	4	0	4	0
26	MF	(Australia)	Mile Jedinak	4	0	4	0
28	DF	(Australia)	Allan Picken	4	0	4	0
37	MF	(Croatia)	Aljoša Asanović	2	1	2	1
–	MF	(Australia)	Mark Silic	5	0	5	0
–	DF	(Australia)	Matthew Clowes	1	0	1	0
Players who left during the season
–	DF	(Australia)	Damien Foxe	6	0	6	0
