= 2001–02 Sydney United FC season =

Sydney United 58 FC
2001–02 season
- Chairman: Marko Franović
- Manager: Branko Culina
- Stadium: Sydney United Sports Centre
- National Soccer League: 11th (League)
- Top goalscorer: Commins Menapi (8), Ante Milicic (8)
- Highest home attendance: 5,177 vs. Marconi Stallions (28 October 2001); National Soccer League
- Lowest home attendance: 1,580 vs. Newcastle United (30 March 2002); National Soccer League
- Average home league attendance: 3,774
- Biggest win: 3–0 vs. Football Kingz (20 October 2001); National Soccer League
- Biggest defeat: 1–4 vs. Olympic Sharks (19 November 2001); National Soccer League

The 2001-02 season marked Sydney United's nineteenth campaign in the NSL, but it proved to be a challenging year. The team finished 11th on the table, managing only six wins throughout the season.

Branko Culina returned to United as manager, having previously guided the club to a premiership and Grand Final appearance in the 1996-97 season. His return also saw the arrival of familiar faces, with former players Ante Milicic and Krešimir Marušić re-joining the squad. However, despite these additions, United struggled to find form and once again missed out on the finals.

The team's difficulties were compounded by mid-season departures, as Milicic, Marušić, Zlatko Arambasic, and Marcus Stergiopoulos all exited the club. In Milicic's case, Sydney United secured a $110,000 transfer fee from Olympic Sharks, providing much-needed financial relief.

Despite the team's struggles, Commins Menapi and Ante Milicic both finished as Sydney United's top goalscorers, netting eight goals each across the season.

== Players ==
Note: Flags indicate national team as defined under FIFA eligibility rules; some limited exceptions apply. Players may hold more than one non-FIFA nationality.

No.	Pos.	Nation	Player
1	GK	AUS	Brett Hughes
2	DF	AUS	Michael Šantalab
3	MF	AUS	Vince Savoca
4	DF	AUS	Elvis Olic
5	MF	AUS	Nahuel Arrarte
6	DF	AUS	Michael Cunico
8	MF	AUS	Ante Moric
9	MF	AUS	Gabriel Mendez
11	MF	CRO	Željko Kopić
12	FW	AUS	Brendon Šantalab
13	MF	AUS	Ante Deur
14	MF	AUS	Goran Talevski
15	MF	AUS	Aytek Genc
16	FW	SOL	Commins Menapi
17	MF	AUS	Paul Bilokapic (Captain)
18	FW	AUS	Daniel Watkins

No.	Pos.	Nation	Player
20	GK	AUS	John Perosh
21	MF	AUS	Mile Jedinak
22	MF	AUS	Milan Bosnar
23	DF	AUS	Michael Cindrić
24	DF	AUS	Sebastian Sinozić
25	MF	AUS	Jon Angelucci
26	MF	AUS	Ivan Zelic
27	GK	AUS	Vilson Knežević
29	MF	AUS	Christian Cevinini
30	GK	AUS	John Karoubas
37	MF	CRO	Aljoša Asanović
—	FW	AUS	Zlatko Arambašić
—	FW	AUS	Ante Milicic (Captain)
—	MF	CRO	Krešimir Marušić
—	MF	AUS	Marcus Stergiopoulos

=== Transfers in ===
No.	Pos.	Nat.	Name	Age	Moving from	Type	Transfer window	Ends	Transfer fee	Source
10	FW	(Australia)	Ante Milicic	27	NK Rijeka (Croatia)	Transfer	Pre-season		Free	
11	MF	(Croatia)	Željko Kopić	24	NK Marsonia (Croatia)	Transfer	Pre-season		Free	
27	GK	(Australia)	Vilson Knežević	25	Germinal Beerschot (Belgium)	Transfer	Pre-season		Free	
7	MF	(Croatia)	Krešimir Marušić	31	Northern Spirit (Australia)	Transfer	Pre-season		Free	
20	GK	(Australia)	John Perosh	27	Northern Spirit (Australia)	Transfer	Pre-season		Free	
18	FW	(Australia)	Daniel Watkins	21	Northern Spirit (Australia)	Transfer	Pre-season		Free	
6	DF	(Australia)	Michael Cunico	22	Northern Spirit (Australia)	Transfer	Pre-season		Free	
2	DF	(Australia)	Michael Šantalab	22	Parramatta Power (Australia)	Transfer	Pre-season		Free	
12	FW	(Australia)	Brendon Šantalab	19	Parramatta Power (Australia)	Transfer	Pre-season		Free	
8	FW	(Australia)	Ante Moric	27	Olympic Sharks (Australia)	Transfer	Pre-season		Free	
24	FW	(Australia)	Marcus Stergiopoulos	28	Eastern Pride (Australia)	Transfer	Pre-season		Free	
26	MF	(Australia)	Ivan Zelic	23	Melbourne Knights (Australia)	Transfer	Pre-season		Free	
25	DF	(Australia)	Jon Angelucci	26	Canberra Cosmos (Australia)	Transfer	Pre-season		Free	

=== Transfers out ===
No.	Pos.	Nat.	Name	Age	Moving to	Type	Transfer window	Transfer fee	Source
4	DF	(Australia)	Velimir Kuprešak	37	Retirement		Pre-season	Free	
5	MF	(Australia)	Richard Plesa	25	FC Aarhus (Denmark)	Transfer	Pre-season	Free	
10	MF	(Australia)	Tom Pondeljak	25	Olympic Sharks (Australia)	End of Contract	Pre-season	Free	
17	FW	(Australia)	Francis Awaritefe	37	Rockdale City Suns (Australia)	End of Contract	Pre-season	Free	
3	DF	(Australia)	Danny Burt	28	Central Coast United (Australia)	End of Contract	Pre-season	Free	
7	DF	(Australia)	Shane Webb	21	Marconi Stallions (Australia)	End of Contract	Pre-season	Free	
12	DF	(Australia)	Tom Maric	24	Fairfield Bulls (Australia)	End of Contract	Pre-season	Free	
14	MF	(Australia)	Kain Rastall	23	Blacktown City FC (Australia)	End of Contract	Pre-season	Free	
19	MF	(Australia)	Terry Palapanis	30	Hurstville City Minotaurs (Australia)	End of Contract	Pre-season	Free	
21	FW	(Solomon Islands)	Akwasi Ageyi	20	Canterbury Marrickville FC (Australia)	End of Contract	Pre-season	Free	
28	DF	(Australia)	Allan Picken	20	APIA Leichhardt (Australia)	End of Contract	Pre-season	Free	
30	GK	(Australia)	Steve Tolios	26	Sydney Crescent Star (Australia)	End of Contract	Pre-season	Free	
	MF	(Australia)	Mark Silic	29	Retirement	End of Contract	Pre-season	Free	

=== Mid-Season Gains ===
No.	Pos.	Nat.	Name	Age	Moving from	Type	Transfer window	Ends	Transfer fee	Source
37	MF	(Croatia)	Aljoša Asanović	35	Free agent	Guest Contract	Mid-season		Free	
8	MF	(Australia)	Gabriel Mendez	28	Northern Spirit (Australia)	Transfer	Mid-season		Undisclosed	
24	DF	(Australia)	Sebastian Sinozić	23	Olympic Sharks (Australia)	Transfer	Mid-season		Undisclosed	

=== Mid-Season Losses ===
No.	Pos.	Nat.	Name	Age	Moving to	Type	Transfer window	Transfer fee	Source
9	FW	(Australia)	Zlatko Arambašić	32	Parramatta Power (Australia)	Transfer	Mid-season		
37	MF	(Croatia)	Aljoša Asanović	36	Free agent	Free	Mid-season		
10	FW	(Australia)	Ante Milicic	27	Olympic Sharks (Australia)	Transfer	Mid-season	$110,000	
7	MF	(Croatia)	Krešimir Marušić	32	Melbourne Knights (Australia)	Transfer	Mid-season		
24	MF	(Australia)	Marcus Stergiopoulos	28	Northern Spirit (Australia)	Transfer	Mid-season		

== Competitions ==
=== Overview ===
Competition	First match	Last match	Starting round	Final position	Record							
Competition	First match	Last match	Starting round	Final position	Pld	W	D	L	GF	GA	GD	Win %
National Soccer League	15 October 2001	29 April 2002	Matchday 1	11th	24	6	6	12	27	37	−10	25.00
Total					24	6	6	12	27	37	−10	25.00

Last updated: complete
Source: Competitions

=== National Soccer League ===
==== League table ====
Pos	Team	Pld	W	D	L	GF	GA	GD	Pts
9	Marconi Fairfield	24	8	6	10	33	36	−3	30
10	Wollongong Wolves	24	6	7	11	28	43	−15	25
11	Sydney United	24	6	6	12	27	37	−10	24
12	Adelaide Force	24	4	8	12	27	39	−12	20
13	Football Kingz	24	3	5	16	28	58	−30	14

Source: rsssf.com
Rules for classification: 1) Points; 2) Goal difference; 3) Goals scored

==== Results summary ====
Overall								Home						Away					
Pld	W	D	L	GF	GA	GD	Pts	W	D	L	GF	GA	GD	W	D	L	GF	GA	GD
24	6	6	12	27	37	−10	24	1	5	6	13	22	−9	5	1	6	14	15	−1

==== Matches ====
6 October 2001 1	Olympic Sharks	1–0	Sydney United	Woolooware, New South Wales
	Macallister 66'	Report		Stadium: Toyota Park; Attendance: 9,612; Referee: Shaun Micallef

14 October 2001 2	Sydney United	1–3	Brisbane Strikers	Edensor Park, New South Wales
	Menapi 44'	Report	Foster 48'; Rech 54'; Trajanovski 65'	Stadium: Sydney United Sports Centre; Attendance: 4,780; Referee: Gerry Connelly

31 October 2001 3	South Melbourne	0–1	Sydney United	Albert Park, Victoria
		Report	Milicic 36'	Stadium: Bob Jane Stadium; Attendance: 5,866; Referee: Con Diomis

28 October 2001 4	Sydney United	1–1	Marconi Stallions	Edensor Park, New South Wales
	Milicic 1'	Report	Tome 68'	Stadium: Sydney United Sports Centre; Attendance: 5,177; Referee: Eddie Lennie

3 November 2001 5	Perth Glory	2–1	Sydney United	Vincent, Western Australia
	Mori 26'; Horsley 47'	Report	Milicic 90+1'	Stadium: Perth Oval; Attendance: 12,975; Referee: Matthew Breeze

9 November 2001 6	Sydney United	1–2	Football Kingz	Edensor Park, New South Wales
	Menapi 62'	Report	Ngata 50', 70'	Stadium: Sydney United Sports Centre; Attendance: 3,817; Referee: P.Mur

17 November 2001 7	Wollongong Wolves	1–0	Sydney United	Wollongong, New South Wales
	Huxley 65'	Report		Stadium: WIN Stadium; Attendance: 3,291; Referee: Angelo Nardi

2 December 2001 9	Sydney United	2–1	Melbourne Knights	Edensor Park, New South Wales
	Menapi 46' (pen.), 78'	Report	Da Costa 10'	Stadium: Sydney United Sports Centre; Attendance: 4,185; Referee: D.Rugg

7 December 2001 10	Northern Spirit	1–2	Sydney United	North Sydney, New South Wales
	Cardozo 53'	Report	Milicic 16'; Menapi 90+2'	Stadium: North Sydney Oval; Attendance: 4,605; Referee: Brett Hugo

16 December 2001 11	Sydney United	0–2	Parramatta Power	Edensor Park, New South Wales
		Report	Eagleton 4'; Kwasnik 83'	Stadium: Sydney Croatian Sports Centre; Attendance: 5,142; Referee: Peter Green

21 December 2001 12	Newcastle United	2–0	Sydney United	Newcastle, New South Wales
	Griffiths 59'; McBreen 86'	Report		Stadium: Energy Australia Stadium; Attendance: 9,136; Referee: Shaun Micallef

6 January 2002 13	Sydney United	1–1	Adelaide Force	Edensor Park, New South Wales
	Milicic 51'	Report	Moreira 31'	Stadium: Sydney United Sports Centre; Attendance: 3,753; Referee: Eddie Lennie

13 January 2002 14	Sydney United	1–4	Olympic Sharks	Edensor Park, New South Wales
	Kopić 83'	Report	North 2', 39'; Pondeljak 61'; Wilson 79'	Stadium: Sydney United Sports Centre; Attendance: 4,589; Referee: P.Mur

19 January 2002 15	Brisbane Strikers	1–2	Sydney United	Herston, Queensland
	Foster 80'	Report	Cevinini 45'; Milicic 54'	Stadium: Ballymore Oval; Attendance: 3,554; Referee: Peter Green

27 January 2002 16	Sydney United	2–2	South Melbourne	Edensor Park, New South Wales
	Bilokapic 60'; Deur 77'	Report	Boutsianis 66', 90'	Stadium: Sydney United Sports Centre; Attendance: 3,350; Referee: Brett Hugo

2 February 2002 17	Marconi Stallions	2–2	Sydney United	Bossley Park, New South Wales
	Tome 31'; Last 90'	Report	Deur 44'; Menapi 76'	Stadium: Marconi Stadium; Attendance: 4,362; Referee: Con Diomis

10 February 2002 18	Sydney United	1–2	Perth Glory	Edensor Park, New South Wales
	Menapi 63'	Report	Mori 71'; Mrdja 76'	Stadium: Sydney United Sports Centre; Attendance: 3,579; Referee: Matthew Breeze

15 February 2002 19	Football Kingz	0–3	Sydney United	Auckland, New Zealand
		Report	Menapi 22'; Deur 61'; Mendez 88'	Stadium: Ericsson Stadium; Attendance: 2,842; Referee: P.Mur

24 February 2002 20	Sydney United	1–2	Wollongong Wolves	Edensor Park, New South Wales
	Arrarte 43'	Report	Sharland 33'; Young 71'	Stadium: Sydney United Sports Centre; Attendance: 3,062; Referee: Peter Green

10 March 2002 22	Melbourne Knights	2–1	Sydney United	Sunshine North, Victoria
	Marušić 18'; DeJesus 25'	Report	Menapi 9'	Stadium: Knights Stadium; Attendance: 3,620; Referee: Craig Zetter

17 March 2002 23	Sydney United	1–1	Northern Spirit	Edensor Park, New South Wales
	Mendez 76'	Report	Cardozo 37'	Stadium: Sydney United Sports Centre; Attendance: 2,280; Referee: Mark Shield

23 March 2002 24	Parramatta Power	2–0	Sydney United	Parramatta, New South Wales
	Brown 19'; Holman 40'	Report		Stadium: Parramatta Stadium; Attendance: 2,991; Referee: Eddie Lennie

30 March 2002 25	Sydney United	1–1	Newcastle United	Edensor Park, New South Wales
	Menapi 74'	Report	Moreira 91' (pen.)	Stadium: Sydney United Sports Centre; Attendance: 1,580; Referee: Matthew Breeze

7 April 2002 26	Adelaide Force	1–2	Sydney United	Hindmarsh, South Australia
	Vidmar 20'	Report	B.Santalab 14'; Jedinak 66'	Stadium: Hindmarsh Stadium; Attendance: 3,500; Referee: Craig Zetter

== Statistics ==
=== Appearances and goals ===
Players with no appearances not included in the list.

No.	Pos.	Nat.	Name	National Soccer League		Total	
No.	Pos.	Nat.	Name	Apps	Goals	Apps	Goals
1	GK	(Australia)	Brett Hughes	1	0	1	0
2	DF	(Australia)	Michael Šantalab	10	0	10	0
3	MF	(Australia)	Vince Savoca	14	0	14	0
4	DF	(Australia)	Elvis Olic	5	0	5	0
5	MF	(Australia)	Nahuel Arrarte	17	1	17	1
6	DF	(Australia)	Michael Cunico	20	0	20	0
7	DF	(Australia)	Raymond Younis	8	0	8	0
8	MF	(Australia)	Ante Moric	7	0	7	0
9	MF	(Australia)	Gabriel Mendez	11	2	11	2
11	MF	(Croatia)	Željko Kopić	11	1	11	1
12	FW	(Australia)	Brendon Šantalab	11	1	11	1
13	MF	(Australia)	Ante Deur	23	3	23	3
14	MF	(Australia)	Goran Talevski	17	0	17	0
15	MF	(Australia)	Aytek Genc	10	0	10	0
16	FW	(Solomon Islands)	Commins Menapi	20	8	20	8
17	MF	(Australia)	Paul Bilokapic	22	1	22	1
18	DF	(Australia)	Daniel Watkins	10	0	10	0
20	GK	(Australia)	John Perosh	4	0	4	0
21	MF	(Australia)	Mile Jedinak	7	1	7	1
22	MF	(Australia)	Milan Bosnar	4	0	4	0
23	DF	(Australia)	Michael Cindrić	4	0	4	0
24	MF	(Australia)	Sebastian Sinozić	13	0	13	0
25	DF	(Australia)	Jon Angelucci	6	0	6	0
27	GK	(Australia)	Vilson Knežević	17	0	17	0
29	MF	(Australia)	Christian Cevenini	10	1	10	1
30	GK	(Australia)	John Karoubas	2	0	2	0
37	MF	(Croatia)	Aljoša Asanović	2	0	2	0
Players who left during the season
–	FW	(Australia)	Zlatko Arambašić	3	0	3	0
–	FW	(Australia)	Ante Milicic	14	8	14	8
–	MF	(Croatia)	Krešimir Marušić	13	0	13	0
–	MF	(Australia)	Marcus Stergiopoulos	9	0	9	0
