= 1996–97 Sydney United FC season =

Sydney United FC
1996–1997 season
- Chairman: Ivan Simić
- Manager: Branko Culina
- Stadium: Sydney United Sports Centre, Parramatta Stadium
- National Soccer League: 1st (League); Runners-Up (Finals)
- Johnny Walker Cup: First Round
- Waratah Cup: Winners
- Top goalscorer: League = David Zdrilic (21); All = Ante Milicic (24)
- Highest home attendance: 11,614 vs. Marconi Fairfield (23 February 1997); National Soccer League
- Lowest home attendance: 2,000 vs. Melbourne Knights (20 November 1996); National Soccer League
- Average home league attendance: 5,974
- Biggest win: 7–0 vs. Collingwood Warriors (8 December 1996); National Soccer League
- Biggest defeat: 0-3 vs. Brisbane Strikers (4 January 1997); National Soccer League

1996–97 marked Sydney United's fourteenth season in the NSL, with Branko Culina in his third season as head coach. The club enjoyed a highly successful campaign, finishing as Premiers with a commanding 9-point lead atop the league table. Striker David Zdrilic was the league's top goalscorer, netting 21 goals during the regular season.

Croatian midfielder Krešimir Marušić, signed in the off-season from NK Inter Zaprešić, was awarded the prestigious Johnny Warren Medal as NSL Player of the Year for his standout performances throughout the season. Head coach Branko Culina was also recognised, receiving the NSL Coach of the Year award for guiding United to the premiership and Grand Final.

In the finals series, Sydney United progressed to the NSL Grand Final after a 1–0 victory over South Melbourne in the Preliminary Final. However, they were defeated 2–0 by Brisbane Strikers in the Grand Final, which was held at Suncorp Stadium before a then-NSL record crowd of 40,446.

Sydney United also claimed silverware in the Waratah Cup, defeating Parramatta Eagles 2–1 in the final, with Ante Milicic scoring both goals. Their run in the Johnny Walker Cup was short-lived, as they were eliminated in the Round of 16 by Sydney Olympic.

Sydney United also won the National Youth League Northern Division Grand Final, defeating Marconi Fairfield 1-0, thanks to a Tony Krslovic goal.

== Players ==
Note: Flags indicate national team as defined under FIFA eligibility rules; some limited exceptions apply. Players may hold more than one non-FIFA nationality.

No.	Pos.	Nation	Player
1	GK	AUS	Zeljko Kalac
2	DF	AUS	Robert Trajkovski
3	DF	CRO	Velimir Kuprešak
4	DF	AUS	Tony Popovic (Captain)
5	DF	AUS	Mark Babic (Captain)
6	MF	AUS	Robert Enes
7	MF	CRO	Damir Cvetko
8	MF	AUS	Ante Moric
9	MF	AUS	Robert Markovac
10	FW	AUS	Ante Milicic
11	MF	CRO	Krešimir Marušić
12	MF	AUS	Aytek Genc
14	FW	AUS	David Zdrilic
15	MF	AUS	Jason Culina
17	DF	AUS	Paul Bilokapic

No.	Pos.	Nation	Player
18	MF	AUS	Richard Pleša
19	FW	AUS	Tony Krslovic
20	GK	AUS	Peter Blazincic
21	DF	AUS	Marko Rudan
22	MF	AUS	Jacob Burns
23	DF	AUS	Chad Gibson
24	MF	AUS	Dean Culina
25	DF	AUS	Tom Marić
26	DF	CRO	Ante Šerić
27	MF	AUS	John Didulica
28	MF	AUS	Ante Deur
30	GK	AUS	John Perosh
31	GK	AUS	Andrew Crews
—	DF	AUS	Joe Vrkic

=== Transfers in ===
No.	Pos.	Nat.	Name	Age	Moving from	Type	Transfer window	Ends	Transfer fee	Source
1	GK	(Australia)	Zeljko Kalac	23	Leicester City (England)	Transfer	Pre-season		Free	
7	MF	(Croatia)	Krešimir Marušić	26	Inter Zaprešić (Croatia)	Transfer	Pre-season		Free	
11	MF	(Croatia)	Damir Cvetko	28	NK Varaždin (Croatia)	Transfer	Pre-season		Free	
19	DF	(Australia)	Joe Vrkic	21	Wollongong City (Australia)	Transfer	Pre-season		Free	
20	GK	(Australia)	Peter Blazincic	27	West Adelaide Sharks (Australia)	Transfer	Pre-season		Free	
27	MF	(Australia)	John Didulica	19	North Geelong Warriors (Australia)	Transfer	Pre-season		Free	
	FW	(Australia)	Tony Krslovic	27	Leichhardt Tigers (Australia)	Transfer	Pre-season		Free	

=== Transfers out ===
No.	Pos.	Nat.	Name	Age	Moving to	Type	Transfer window	Transfer fee	Source
13	MF	(Australia)	Jim Patikas	32	UTS Olympic (Australia)	End of Contract	Pre-season	Free	
15	FW	(Australia)	Zeljko Babic	20	Marconi Fairfield (Australia)	End of Contract	Pre-season	Free	
16	FW	(Papua New Guinea)	Manis Lamond	30	Wollongong City (Australia)	End of Contract	Pre-season	Free	
22	MF	(Australia)	Mirko Jurilj	22	Rockdale City Suns (Australia)	End of Contract	Pre-season	Free	

=== Mid-Season Losses ===
No.	Pos.	Nat.	Name	Age	Moving to	Type	Transfer window	Transfer fee	Source
4	DF	(Australia)	Tony Popovic	23	Sanfrecce Hiroshima (Japan)	Transfer	Mid-season		
19	DF	(Australia)	Joe Vrkic	20	Collingwood Warriors (Australia)	Loan	Mid-season	Free	

== Competitions ==
=== Overview ===
Competition	First match	Last match	Starting round	Final position	Record							
Competition	First match	Last match	Starting round	Final position	Pld	W	D	L	GF	GA	GD	Win %
National Soccer League	13 October 1996	20 April 1997	Matchday 1	Winners	26	17	5	4	67	33	+34	65.38
Final Series	3 May 1997	55 May 1995	Major Semi-Final	Runners Up	4	2	0	2	3	4	−1	50.00
Johnny Walker Cup	6 September 1996	10 September 1996	Round of 16	Round of 16	2	0	0	2	0	2	−2	0.00
Waratah Cup	3 September 1996	22 September 1996	Round 6	Winners	4	4	0	0	10	2	+8	100.00
Total					36	23	5	8	80	41	+39	63.89

Last updated: complete
Source: Competitions

=== National Soccer League ===
==== League table ====
Pos	Team	Pld	W	D	L	GF	GA	GD	Pts	Qualification
1	Sydney United	26	17	5	4	67	33	+34	56	Qualification for the Finals series
2	Brisbane Strikers (C)	26	15	2	9	55	40	+15	47	Qualification for the Finals series
3	South Melbourne	26	14	4	8	39	25	+14	46	Qualification for the Finals series
4	Adelaide City	26	11	10	5	32	22	+10	43	Qualification for the Finals series
5	Marconi Fairfield	26	12	4	10	41	37	+4	40	Qualification for the Finals series
6	Melbourne Knights	26	11	6	9	36	32	+4	39	Qualification for the Finals series
7	Perth Glory	26	11	5	10	48	41	+7	38	
8	West Adelaide	26	10	3	13	39	51	−12	33	
9	UTS Olympic	26	8	8	10	41	46	−5	32	
10	Wollongong Wolves	26	8	8	10	42	48	−6	32	
11	Newcastle Breakers	26	7	9	10	40	46	−6	30	
12	Gippsland Falcons	26	8	6	12	33	41	−8	30	
13	Collingwood Warriors	26	6	9	11	32	44	−12	27	
14	Canberra Cosmos	26	2	5	19	30	69	−39	11	

Updated to match(es) played on unknown. Source: rsssf.com
Rules for classification: 1) points; 2) goal difference; 3) number of goals scored.
(C) Champions

==== Matches ====
13 October 1996 1	Sydney United	3–3	Wollongong City	Edensor Park, New South Wales
	Zdrilic 9'; M.Babic 37'; Milicic 81'	Report	Horsley 7', 52'; Sevin 15'	Stadium: Sydney United Sports Centre; Attendance: 4,085; Referee: Matthew Breeze

20 October 1996 2	South Melbourne	1–3	Sydney United	Melbourne, Victoria
	Orlic 47'	Report	Marušić 24'; Zdrilic 37', 40'	Stadium: Lakeside Stadium; Attendance: 8,668; Referee: B Panella

6 November 1996 3	Sydney United	3—1	Melbourne Knights	Edensor Park, New South Wales
	Kuprešak 58'; Zdrilic 76'; Cvetko 90+2'	Report	Kutlesovski 51'	Stadium: Sydney United Sports Centre; Attendance: 2,000; Referee: Eugene Brazzale

2 November 1996 4	Marconi Fairfield	0–3	Sydney United	Bossley Park, New South Wales
		Report	Zdrilic 48'; Moric 50'; Cvetko 81'	Stadium: Marconi Stadium; Attendance: 8,952; Referee: Eddie Lennie

10 November 1996 5	Sydney United	2–1	UTS Olympic	Edensor Park, New South Wales
	Popovic 60', 82 (pen)'	Report	Sorras 65'	Stadium: Sydney United Sports Centre; Attendance: 11,381; Referee: Shaun Micallef

17 November 1996 6	West Adelaide Sharks	2—3	Sydney United	Hindmarsh, South Australia
	Cardozo 60'; Slager 89'	Report	Zdrilic 21'; Babic 39'; Milicic 76'	Stadium: Hindmarsh Stadium; Attendance: 4,703; Referee: Eddie Lennie

23 November 1996 7	Sydney United	4–2	Perth Glory	Edensor Park, New South Wales
	Kuprešak 36'; Zdrilic 38'; Marušić 43'; Milicic 61'	Report	Strudwick 11'; Kalogeracos 73'	Stadium: Sydney United Sports Centre; Attendance: 3,450; Referee: Con Diomis

30 November 1996 8	Canberra Cosmos	1–3	Sydney United	Bruce, Australian Capital Territory
	Dee 23'	Report	Milicic 34'; Rudan 57'; Zdrilic 82'	Stadium: Bruce Stadium; Attendance: 3,500; Referee: W Dade

8 December 1996 9	Sydney United	7–0	Collingwood Warriors	Edensor Park, New South Wales
	Zdrilic 13', 16', 38', 80'; Rudan 42'; Moric 56'; Milicic 89'	Report		Stadium: Sydney United Sports Centre; Attendance: 5,451; Referee: Brett Hugo

14 December 1996 10	Gippsland Falcons	1–2	Sydney United	Morwell, Victoria
	Masi 57'	Report	Enes 28'; Milicic 84'	Stadium: Falcons Park; Attendance: 2,579; Referee: Gerry Connelly

20 December 1996 11	Newcastle Breakers	3–1	Sydney United	Newcastle, New South Wales
	Pryce 68'; Zane 70'; Bennett 74'	Report	Milcic 54'	Stadium: Breakers Stadium; Attendance: 4,225; Referee: Matthew Breeze

29 December 1996 12	Sydney United	1–1	Adelaide City	Edensor Park, New South Wales
	Armour (og) 74'	Report	Hassell 41'	Stadium: Sydney United Sports Centre; Attendance: 5,195; Referee: Eugene Brazzale

4 January 1997 13	Brisbane Strikers	3–0	Sydney United	Brisbane, Queensland
	Brown 5'; Farina 33'; Battistin 90'	Report		Stadium: Suncorp Stadium; Attendance: 13,121; Referee: Gerry Connelly

12 January 1997 14	Sydney United	4-0	Brisbane Strikers	Parramatta, New South Wales
	Milicic 13', 84'; Genc 21'; Zdrilic 88'	Report		Stadium: Parramatta Stadium; Attendance: 10,560; Referee: Shaun Micallef

2 February 1997 15	Wollongong City	1–4	Sydney United	Fairy Meadow, New South Wales
	Surjan 83'	Report	Milicic 17', 24', 88'; van Egmond (og) 68'	Stadium: Brandon Park; Attendance: 10,158; Referee: Mark Shields

9 February 1997 16	Sydney United	2–0	South Melbourne	Edensor Park, New South Wales
	Trajkovski 27'; Zdrilic 34'	Report		Stadium: Sydney United Sports Centre; Attendance: 4,500; Referee: Gerry Connelly

16 February 1997 17	Melbourne Knights	1–1	Sydney United	North Sunshine, Victoria
	A.Cervinski 90'	Report	Enes 10'	Stadium: Somers St Stadium; Attendance: 5,935; Referee: Eddie Lennie

23 February 1997 18	Sydney United	1–3	Marconi Fairfield	Parramatta, New South Wales
	Zdrilic 18'	Report	Z.Babic 16'; Harper 65', 75'	Stadium: Parramatta Stadium; Attendance: 11,614; Referee: Shaun Micallef

2 March 1997 19	UTS Olympic	1–1	Sydney United	Belmore, New South Wales
	Trajanovski 87 (pen)'	Report	Milicic 26'	Stadium: Belmore Sports Ground; Attendance: 7,924; Referee: Mark Shields

10 March 1997 20	Sydney United	4–0	West Adelaide Sharks	Edensor Park, New South Wales
	Moric 25'; Milicic 36', 49'; Zdrilic 75'	Report		Stadium: Sydney United Sports Centre; Attendance: 4,728; Referee: Matthew Breeze

15 March 1997 21	Perth Glory	3-1	Sydney United	Perth, Western Australia
	Kalogeracos 30', 65'; Wingell 24'	Report	Enes 47'	Stadium: Perth Oval; Attendance: 11,644; Referee: Gerry Connelly

23 March 1997 22	Sydney United	7–2	Canberra Cosmos	Edensor Park, New South Wales
	Zdrilic 3', 49', 67', 89'; Moric 38'; Kuprešak 46'; Genc 73'	Report	Markovski 39'; Mazis 40'	Stadium: Sydney Croatian Sports Centre; Attendance: 4,026; Referee: Mark Shields

31 March 1997 23	Collingwood Warriors	2–3	Sydney United	Melbourne, Victoria
	Di Iorio 15'; Vlahos 56'	Report	Enes 25'; Milicic 69'; Zdrilic 88'	Stadium: Olympic Park; Attendance: 1,700; Referee: Gerry Connelly

6 April 1997 24	Sydney United	1–0	Gippsland Falcons	Edensor Park, New South Wales
	Milicic 71'	Report		Stadium: Sydney United Sports Centre; Attendance: 5,501; Referee: G Leverton

13 April 1997 25	Sydney United	2–0	Newcastle Breakers	Edensor Park, New South Wales
	Milicic 49'; Marušić 75'	Report		Stadium: Sydney United Sports Centre; Attendance: 5,179; Referee: Eddie Lennie

20 April 1997 26	Adelaide City	1–1	Sydney United	Hindmarsh, South Australia
	Brooks 23'	Report	Genc 71'	Stadium: Hindmarsh Stadium; Attendance: 8,753; Referee: Brett Hugo

=== NSL Final Series ===
3 May 1997 Major Semi-Final - 1st Leg	Brisbane Strikers	1–0	Sydney United	Brisbane, Queensland
	S.Cranney 62'	Report		Stadium: Suncorp Stadium; Attendance: 14,666; Referee: Eddie Lennie

11 May 1997 Elimination Final - 2nd Leg	Sydney United	2–1	Brisbane Strikers	Parramatta, New South Wales
	J.Culina 25'; Marušić 35'	Report	Knipe 77'	Stadium: Parramatta Stadium; Attendance: 7,127; Referee: Eugene Brazzale

18 May 1997 Preliminary Final	Sydney United	1–0	South Melbourne	Parramatta, New South Wales
	Milicic 66'	Report		Stadium: Parramatta Stadium; Attendance: 8,059; Referee: Brett Hugo

25 May 1997 Grand Final	Brisbane Strikers	2–0	Sydney United	Brisbane, Queensland
	Farina 47'; Brown 69'	Report		Stadium: Suncorp Stadium; Attendance: 40,446; Referee: Shaun Micallef

=== Johnny Walker Cup ===
6 September 1996 Round of 16 1st Leg	Sydney United	0–1	UTS Olympic	Edensor Park, New South Wales
		Report	Tome 77'	Stadium: Sydney United Sports Centre; Referee: Brett Hugo

10 September 1996 Round of 16 2nd Leg	UTS Olympic	1–0	Sydney United	Edensor Park, New South Wales
	Tome 65'	Report		Stadium: Sydney United Sports Centre; Referee: Shaun Micallef

=== Waratah Cup ===
3 September 1996 Waratah Cup Sixth Round	Sydney United	1-0	Canberra Cosmos	Edensor Park, New South Wales
		Report		Stadium: Sydney United Sports Centre

September 1996 Waratah Cup Seventh Round	Sydney United	4-0	Highfields Wolves	Edensor Park, New South Wales
	Milicic; Zdrilic	Report		Stadium: Sydney United Sports Centre

15 September 1996 Waratah Cup Semi-Finals	Marconi Fairfield	1-3	Sydney United	South Granville, New South Wales
	Harper 38'	Report	Zdrilic 30'; Markovac 32'; C.Gibson 50'	Stadium: Melita Stadium; Attendance: 1,149; Referee: Brett Hugo

22 September 1996 Waratah Cup Final	Sydney United	2-1	Parramatta Eagles	Edensor Park, New South Wales
	Milicic 83', 107'	Report	Harding 12'	Stadium: Sydney United Sports Centre; Attendance: 2,896; Referee: Shaun Micallef

== Statistics ==
=== Appearances and goals ===
Players with no appearances not included in the list.

No.	Pos.	Nat.	Name	National Soccer League		Final Series		Johhny Walker Cup		Waratah Cup		Total					
No.	Pos.	Nat.	Name	1	GK	(Australia)	Zeljko Kalac	26	0	3	0	0	0	0	0	29	0
2	DF	(Australia)	Robert Trajkovski	25	1	4	0	0	0	0	0	29	1				
3	DF	(Croatia)	Velimir Kuprešak	22	3	4	0	2	0	2	0	30	3				
5	DF	(Australia)	Mark Babic	24	2	3	0	0	0	0	0	27	2				
6	MF	(Australia)	Robert Enes	22	4	3	0	1	0	2	0	28	4				
7	MF	(Croatia)	Krešimir Marušić	24	3	4	1	0	0	0	0	28	4				
8	MF	(Australia)	Ante Moric	23	4	4	0	2	0	0	0	29	4				
9	MF	(Australia)	Robert Markovac	13	3	0	0	2	0	2	1	17	4				
10	FW	(Australia)	Ante Milicic	26	18	4	1	2	0	3	5	35	24				
11	MF	(Croatia)	Damir Cvetko	20	2	2	0	0	0	0	0	22	2				
12	DF	(Australia)	Aytek Genc	11	3	2	0	0	0	0	0	13	3				
14	FW	(Australia)	David Zdrilic	26	21	4	0	2	0	3	2	35	23				
15	MF	(Australia)	Jason Culina	12	3	3	1	2	0	2	0	19	4				
17	DF	(Australia)	Paul Bilokapic	22	0	4	0	2	0	2	0	30	0				
18	MF	(Australia)	Richard Pleša	6	0	2	0	0	0	0	0	8	0				
19	FW	(Australia)	Tony Krslovic	1	0	0	0	0	0	0	0	1	0				
20	GK	(Australia)	Peter Blazincic	0	0	0	0	1	0	2	0	3	0				
21	DF	(Australia)	Marko Rudan	15	2	1	0	2	0	0	0	18	2				
22	MF	(Australia)	Jacob Burns	4	0	1	0	0	0	2	0	7	0				
23	DF	(Australia)	Chad Gibson	6	0	0	0	2	0	2	1	10	1				
24	MF	(Australia)	Dean Culina	3	0	0	0	1	0	2	0	6	0				
25	DF	(Australia)	Tom Marić	0	0	0	0	1	0	0	0	1	0				
27	DF	(Australia)	John Didulica	3	0	1	0	0	0	0	0	4	0				
30	GK	(Australia)	John Perosh	0	0	1	0	1	0	1	0	3	0				
28	MF	(Australia)	Ante Deur	0	0	0	0	1	0	2	0	3	0				
Players who left during the season
4	MF	(Australia)	Tony Popovic	7	2	0	0	0	0	0	0	7	2				
19	DF	(Australia)	Joe Vrkic	2	0	0	0	2	0	1	0	5	0				
