= 2002–03 Sydney United FC season =

Sydney United FC
2002–03 season
- Chairman: John Jedinak/Peter Gašparović
- Manager: Branko Culina (Rounds 1-17); Tony Krslovic & Tony Pezzano (Rounds 18-26)
- Stadium: Sydney United Sports Centre
- National Soccer League: 8th (League)
- Top goalscorer: Brendon Santalab (6)
- Highest home attendance: 5,352 vs. Northern Spirit (20 October 2002); National Soccer League
- Lowest home attendance: 2,021 vs. Perth Glory (26 January 2003); National Soccer League
- Average home league attendance: 3,409
- Biggest win: 2–0 vs. Newcastle United (29 September 2002); National Soccer League; 2-0 vs. Marconi Stallions (1 December 2002); National Soccer League; 2-0 vs. Melbourne Knights (22 February 2003); National Soccer League; 3-1 vs. Brisbane Strikers (15 March 2003); National Soccer League
- Biggest defeat: 0–3 vs. Parramatta Power (8 December 2002); National Soccer League; 0–3 vs. Brisbane Strikers (15 December 2002); National Soccer League; 1–4 vs. Newcastle United (20 December 2002; National Soccer League

The 2002-03 season marked Sydney United's twentieth campaign in the NSL. The team finished 8th on the table, missing out on the final series.

Branko Culina retained his position for the season, but a series of poor results mid-season saw Culina leave the club, replaced by former player Tony Krslovic and Tony Pezzano as joint managers for the rest of the season.

Some notable player signings included four imports who were goalkeeper Vanja Iveša and defender Božidar Čačić from NK Novalja and NK Rijeka in Croatia, defender Boris Pavić from NK Čelik Zenica in Bosnia and Herzegovina, and also midfielder Slavomír Lukáč from FC Nitra in Slovakia.

Brendon Santalab finished top goalscorer for the season with six goals.

== Players ==
Note: Flags indicate national team as defined under FIFA eligibility rules; some limited exceptions apply. Players may hold more than one non-FIFA nationality.

No.	Pos.	Nation	Player
1	GK	CRO	Vanja Iveša
2	DF	CRO	Božidar Čačić
3	DF	CRO	Boris Pavić
4	DF	AUS	Paul Bilokapic (Captain)
5	DF	AUS	David Barrett
6	MF	AUS	Nahuel Arrarte
7	MF	SVK	Slavomír Lukáč
8	MF	AUS	Mile Jedinak
9	FW	AUS	Željko Babic
10	MF	AUS	Petar Markovic
11	FW	AUS	Christian Cevenini
12	DF	AUS	Damon Collina
14	DF	AUS	Michael Šantalab
15	MF	AUS	Louis Brain
16	FW	SOL	Commins Menapi

No.	Pos.	Nation	Player
17	MF	AUS	Michael Cunico
19	FW	AUS	Brendon Šantalab
20	GK	AUS	John Perosh
23	MF	AUS	Anthony Doumanis
24	FW	AUS	Milan Bosnar
25	MF	AUS	Ante Deur
26	DF	AUS	Marko Rudan
27	DF	AUS	Matthew Clowes
—	FW	AUS	Jon Angelucci
—	DF	AUS	Michael Cindrić
—		AUS	Christopher Cop
—	MF	AUS	Gabriel Mendez
—	MF	AUS	Vince Savoca
—	MF	AUS	Daniel Watkins

=== Transfers in ===
No.	Pos.	Nat.	Name	Age	Moving from	Type	Transfer window	Ends	Transfer fee	Source
1	GK	(Croatia)	Vanja Iveša	25	NK Novalja (Croatia)	Transfer	Pre-season		Free	
2	DF	(Croatia)	Božidar Čačić	30	NK Rijeka (Croatia)	Transfer	Pre-season		Free	
3	DF	(Croatia)	Boris Pavić	28	NK Čelik Zenica (Bosnia and Herzegovina)	Transfer	Pre-season		Free	
5	DF	(Australia)	David Barrett	33	Parramatta Power (Australia)	Transfer	Pre-season		Free	
7	MF	(Slovakia)	Slavomír Lukáč	22	FC Nitra (Slovakia)	Transfer	Pre-season		Free	
15	MF	(Australia)	Louis Brain	20	Adelaide City Force (Australia)	Transfer	Pre-season		Free	
12	MF	(Australia)	Damon Collina	24	Olympic Sharks (Australia)	Transfer	Pre-season		Free	
23	MF	(Australia)	Anthony Doumanis	20	Olympic Sharks (Australia)	Transfer	Pre-season		Free	
26	DF	(Australia)	Marko Rudan	27	Nanjing Yoyo (China)	Transfer	Pre-season		Free	

=== Transfers out ===
No.	Pos.	Nat.	Name	Age	Moving to	Type	Transfer window	Transfer fee	Source
4	MF	(Australia)	Aytek Genc	38	Retirement		Pre-season	Free	
11	MF	(Croatia)	Željko Kopić	25	Hrvatski Dragovoljac (Croatia)	Transfer	Pre-season	Free	
14	MF	(Australia)	Goran Talevski	20	Marconi Stallions (Australia)	End of Contract	Pre-season	Free	
8	MF	(Australia)	Ante Moric	28	Fraser Park Jets (Australia)	End of Contract	Pre-season	Free	
24	DF	(Australia)	Sebastian Sinozić	23	St George FC (Australia)	End of Contract	Pre-season	Free	
30	GK	(Australia)	John Karoubas	22	Free agent	End of Contract	Pre-season	Free	
27	GK	(Australia)	Vilson Knežević	26	Free agent	End of Contract	Pre-season	Free	
4	DF	(Australia)	Elvis Olic	21	Free agent	End of Contract	Pre-season	Free	
26	MF	(Australia)	Ivan Zelic	24	Free agent	End of Contract	Pre-season	Free	

=== Mid-Season Gains ===
No.	Pos.	Nat.	Name	Age	Moving from	Type	Transfer window	Ends	Transfer fee	Source
9	FW	(Australia)	Željko Babic	26	Wollongong City Wolves (Australia)	Transfer	Mid-season		Free	

=== Mid-Season Losses ===
No.	Pos.	Nat.	Name	Age	Moving to	Type	Transfer window	Transfer fee	Source
9	MF	(Australia)	Gabriel Mendez	29	Johor FC (Malaysia)	Loan	Mid-season		
18	MF	(Australia)	Daniel Watkins	22	Johor FC (Malaysia)	Loan	Mid-season		
25	FW	(Australia)	Jon Angelucci	27	Johor FC (Malaysia)	Loan	Mid-season		
13	MF	(Australia)	Vince Savoca	27	St George FC (Australia)	Transfer	Mid-season		
23	DF	(Australia)	Michael Cindrić	20	Fairfield Bulls (Australia)	Transfer	Mid-season		

== Competitions ==
=== Overview ===
Competition	First match	Last match	Starting round	Final position	Record							
Competition	First match	Last match	Starting round	Final position	Pld	W	D	L	GF	GA	GD	Win %
National Soccer League	22 September 2002	15 March 2003	Matchday 1	8th	24	7	6	11	23	31	−8	29.17
Total					24	7	6	11	23	31	−8	29.17

Last updated: complete
Source: Competitions

=== National Soccer League ===
==== League table ====
Pos	Team	Pld	W	D	L	GF	GA	GD	Pts	Qualification
6	Northern Spirit	24	11	3	10	37	44	−7	36	Qualification for the Championship play-offs
7	South Melbourne	24	10	5	9	36	37	−1	35	
8	Sydney United	24	7	6	11	23	31	−8	27	
9	Melbourne Knights	24	7	6	11	38	52	−14	27	
10	Brisbane Strikers	24	7	5	12	38	45	−7	26	

Source: rsssf.com
Rules for classification: 1) Points; 2) Goal difference; 3) Goals scored

==== Results summary ====
Overall								Home						Away					
Pld	W	D	L	GF	GA	GD	Pts	W	D	L	GF	GA	GD	W	D	L	GF	GA	GD
24	7	6	11	23	31	−8	27	6	3	3	14	10	+4	1	3	8	9	21	−12

==== Matches ====
22 September 2002 1	Football Kingz	0–0	Sydney United	Auckland, New Zealand
		Report		Stadium: Ericsson Stadium; Attendance: 2,999; Referee: Derek Rugg

29 September 2002 2	Sydney United	2–0	Newcastle United	Edensor Park, New South Wales
	B.Šantalab 49'; Menapi 74'	Report		Stadium: Sydney United Sports Centre; Attendance: 3,371; Referee: Brett Hugo

6 October 2002 3	South Melbourne	1–1	Sydney United	Albert Park, Victoria
	Coveny 24'	Report	Čačić 32'	Stadium: Bob Jane Stadium; Attendance: 4,156; Referee: Perry Mur

4	Bye
	Report

20 October 2002 5	Sydney United	1–1	Northern Spirit	Edensor Park, New South Wales
	Menapi 38'	Report	McDermott 43'	Stadium: Sydney United Sports Centre; Attendance: 5,352; Referee: Con Diomis

27 October 2002 6	Perth Glory	2–0	Sydney United	Vincent, Western Australia
	Mori 9', 74' (pen.)	Report		Stadium: Perth Oval; Attendance: 7,595; Referee: Mark Shield

3 November 2002 7	Sydney United	2–1	Wollongong Wolves	Edensor Park, New South Wales
	Angelucci 71'; Čačić 81'	Report	Young 53'	Stadium: Sydney United Sports Centre; Attendance: 4,152; Referee: Simon Przydacz

10 November 2002 8	Olympic Sharks	1–0	Sydney United	Woolooware, New South Wales
	Packer 90'	Report		Stadium: Shark Park; Attendance: 3,620; Referee: Angelo Nardi

17 November 2002 9	Sydney United	2–1	Adelaide City Force	Edensor Park, New South Wales
	Angelucci 45', 87'	Report	Vidmar 84'	Stadium: Sydney United Sports Centre; Attendance: 3,963; Referee: Mark Shield

24 November 2002 10	Melbourne Knights	3–2	Sydney United	Sunshine North, Victoria
	Pelikan 28'; Biscayzacú 58' (pen.); A.Cervinski 78'	Report	B.Šantalab 3', 55'	Stadium: Knights Stadium; Attendance: 4,155; Referee: Craig Zetter

1 December 2002 11	Sydney United	2–0	Marconi Stallions	Edensor Park, New South Wales
	Šantalab 34' (pen.); Deur 64'	Report		Stadium: Sydney United Sports Centre; Attendance: 3,826; Referee: Eddie Lennie

8 December 2002 12	Parramatta Power	3–0	Sydney United	Parramatta, New South Wales
	Salapasidis 44'; Maloney 45'; Elrich 75'	Report		Stadium: Parramatta Stadium; Attendance: 3,004; Referee: Ben Williams

15 December 2002 13	Sydney United	0–3	Brisbane Strikers	Edensor Park, New South Wales
		Report	Pilic 32'; Rech 56'; Roche 62'	Stadium: Sydney United Sports Centre; Attendance: 3,263; Referee: Matthew Breeze

20 December 2002 14	Newcastle United	4–1	Sydney United	Newcastle, New South Wales
	J.Griffiths 14' (pen.), 47' (pen.); Masi 54'; Middleby 90'	Report	Šantalab 77' (pen.)	Stadium: EnergyAustralia Stadium; Attendance: 5,076; Referee: Ben Williams

29 December 2002 15	Sydney United	1–0	Football Kingz	Edensor Park, New South Wales
	Doumanis 11'	Report		Stadium: Sydney United Sports Centre; Attendance: 2,943; Referee: Peter Green

5 January 2003 16	Sydney United	0–1	South Melbourne	Edensor Park, New South Wales
		Report	Coveny 45'	Stadium: Sydney United Sports Centre; Attendance: 2,730; Referee: Mark Shield

17	Bye
	Report

17 January 2003 18	Northern Spirit	1–0	Sydney United	North Sydney, New South Wales
	Spencer 70'	Report		Stadium: North Sydney Oval; Attendance: 2,016; Referee: Craig Zetter

26 January 2003 19	Sydney United	1–1	Perth Glory	Edensor Park, New South Wales
	Šantalab 54'	Report	Dega 20'	Stadium: Sydney United Sports Centre; Attendance: 2,021; Referee: Matthew Breeze

31 January 2003 20	Wollongong Wolves	2–1	Sydney United	Wollongong, New South Wales
	Stanton 4'; Mennillo 32'	Report	Jedinak 45'	Stadium: WIN Stadium; Attendance: 3,031; Referee: Matthew Breeze

9 February 2003 21	Sydney United	1–1	Olympic Sharks	Edensor Park, New South Wales
	Doumanis 87'	Report	Milicic 36'	Stadium: Sydney United Sports Centre; Attendance: 3,653; Referee: Eddie Lennie

14 February 2003 22	Adelaide City Force	2–0	Sydney United	Hindmarsh, South Australia
	Pelosi 43'; Lozanovski 90'	Report		Stadium: Hindmarsh Stadium; Attendance: 1,982; Referee: Angelo Nardi

22 February 2003 23	Sydney United	2–0	Melbourne Knights	Edensor Park, New South Wales
	Doumanis 44'; Lukáč 90'	Report		Stadium: Sydney United Sports Centre; Attendance: 2,391; Referee: Ben Williams

28 February 2003 24	Marconi Stallions	1–1	Sydney United	Bossley Park, New South Wales
	Last 23'	Report	Collina 19'	Stadium: Marconi Stadium; Attendance: 2,377; Referee: Matthew Breeze

9 March 2003 25	Sydney United	0–1	Parramatta Power	Edensor Park, New South Wales
		Report	Barrett (og) 75'	Stadium: Sydney United Sports Centre; Attendance: 3,251; Referee: Matthew Breeze

15 March 2003 26	Brisbane Strikers	1–3	Sydney United	Herston, Queensland
	Rech 23' (pen.)	Report	Jedinak 56'; Cunico 63'; Brain 70'	Stadium: Ballymore Stadium; Attendance: 1,987; Referee: Brett Hugo

== Statistics ==
=== Appearances and goals ===
Players with no appearances not included in the list.

No.	Pos.	Nat.	Name	National Soccer League		Total	
No.	Pos.	Nat.	Name	Apps	Goals	Apps	Goals
1	GK	(Croatia)	Vanja Ivesa	24	0	24	0
2	DF	(Croatia)	Božidar Čačić	18	2	18	2
3	DF	(Croatia)	Boris Pavić	15	0	15	0
4	DF	(Australia)	Paul Bilokapic	23	0	23	0
5	DF	(Australia)	David Barrett	19	0	19	0
6	MF	(Australia)	Nahuel Arrarte	14	0	14	0
7	MF	(Slovakia)	Slavomír Lukáč	14	1	14	1
8	MF	(Australia)	Mile Jedinak	18	2	18	2
9	FW	(Australia)	Zeljko Babic	9	0	9	0
10	MF	(Australia)	Petar Markovic	5	0	5	0
11	MF	(Australia)	Christian Cevenini	1	0	1	0
12	MF	(Australia)	Damon Collina	17	1	17	1
14	DF	(Australia)	Michael Šantalab	9	0	9	0
15	MF	(Australia)	Louis Brain	22	1	22	1
16	FW	(Solomon Islands)	Commins Menapi	18	2	18	2
17	MF	(Australia)	Michael Cunico	7	1	7	1
19	FW	(Australia)	Brendon Šantalab	17	6	17	6
20	GK	(Australia)	John Perosh	1	0	1	0
22	MF	(Australia)	Milan Bosnar	4	0	4	0
23	MF	(Australia)	Anthony Doumanis	21	3	21	3
25	MF	(Australia)	Ante Deur	13	1	13	1
Players who left during the season
9	MF	(Australia)	Gabriel Mendez	12	0	12	0
13	MF	(Australia)	Vince Savoca	1	0	1	0
18	DF	(Australia)	Daniel Watkins	4	0	4	0
25	FW	(Australia)	Jon Angelucci	9	3	9	3
