= 1995-96 Sydney United FC season =

Sydney United 58 FC
1995–1996 season
- Chairman: Ivan Simić
- Manager: Branko Culina
- Stadium: Sydney United Sports Centre
- National Soccer League: 6th (League); Semi-Finals (Finals)
- Johnny Walker Cup: First Round
- Waratah Cup: Winners
- Top goalscorer: League = David Zdrilic (9); All = Zeljko Babic (11)
- Highest home attendance: 9,170 vs. UTS Olympic (11 February 1996); National Soccer League
- Lowest home attendance: 1,836 vs. Marconi Fairfield (20 January 1996); Johnny Walker Cup
- Average home league attendance: 4,340
- Biggest win: 3–0 vs. Canberra Cosmos (16 December 1995); National Soccer League; 3-0 vs. Wollongong City (26 December 1995); National Soccer League; 4–1 vs. South Melbourne (6 January 1996); National Soccer League; 3–0 vs. West Adelaide Sharks (9 March 1996); National Soccer League; 3–0 vs. Newcastle Breakers (20 March 1996); National Soccer League
- Biggest defeat: 0–4 vs. Brisbane Strikers (22 December 1995); National Soccer League

The 1995–96 season marked Sydney United's fourteenth campaign in the NSL. Under the leadership of head coach Branko Culina, in his second year at the helm, the team secured a 6th-place finish in the league.

In the finals series, Sydney United triumphed over the Brisbane Strikers with a comprehensive 4–1 aggregate victory in the Elimination Semi-Final. However, their pursuit of the championship was cut short in the subsequent Minor Semi-Final, where they suffered a narrow 1–0 defeat to Adelaide City.

During the pre-season, Sydney United claimed the Waratah Cup title, defeating Canterbury Marrickville FC 2–1 in the final, with goals from Zeljko Babic and Ante Moric. Conversely, their campaign in the Johnny Walker Cup was less successful, as they exited in the First Round following a 3–1 aggregate loss to the Marconi Stallions.

David Zdrilic emerged as Sydney United's leading goalscorer in the NSL, netting nine goals, while Zeljko Babic led the team across all competitions with a total of eleven goals.

== Players ==
Note: Flags indicate national team as defined under FIFA eligibility rules; some limited exceptions apply. Players may hold more than one non-FIFA nationality.

No.	Pos.	Nation	Player
1	GK	AUS	John Perosh
2	DF	AUS	Robert Trajkovski
3	DF	CRO	Velimir Kuprešak
4	DF	AUS	Tony Popovic (Captain)
5	DF	AUS	Mark Babic
6	MF	AUS	Robert Enes
7	MF	AUS	Aytek Genc
8	MF	AUS	Ante Moric
9	MF	AUS	Robert Markovac
10	MF	AUS	Ante Milicic
11	MF	AUS	Dominic Ušalj
12	DF	AUS	Marko Rudan
13	MF	AUS	Jim Patikas

No.	Pos.	Nation	Player
14	FW	AUS	David Zdrilic
15	FW	AUS	Zeljko Babic
16	FW	PNG	Manis Lamond
17	DF	AUS	Paul Bilokapic
18	MF	AUS	Richard Plesa
20	GK	AUS	Andrew Crews
21	FW	AUS	James Aschner
22	MF	AUS	Mirko Jurilj
23	DF	AUS	Chad Gibson
—	MF	AUS	Jacob Burns
—	FW	AUS	Mario Jermen
—	MF	AUS	Ljupčo Trajcevski
—	DF	AUS	Joe Vrkic

=== Transfers in ===
No.	Pos.	Nat.	Name	Age	Moving from	Type	Transfer window	Ends	Transfer fee	Source
9	MF	(Australia)	Robert Markovac	28	Waterford United (Republic of Ireland)	Transfer	Pre-season		Free	
2	MF	(Australia)	Robert Trajkovski	22	Melbourne SC (Australia)	Transfer	Pre-season		Free	
6	MF	(Australia)	Robert Enes	19	Melbourne SC (Australia)	Transfer	Pre-season		Free	
20	GK	(Australia)	Andrew Crews	21	Blacktown City Demons (Australia)	Transfer	Pre-season		Free	
21	FW	(Australia)	James Aschner	19	Sutherland Sharks (Australia)	Transfer	Pre-season		Free	

=== Transfers out ===
No.	Pos.	Nat.	Name	Age	Moving to	Type	Transfer window	Transfer fee	Source
7	MF	(Croatia)	Ivan Petković	35	Retirement		Pre-season	Free	
1	GK	(Australia)	Zeljko Kalac	22	Leicester City (England)	Transfer	Pre-season	$1.7 million	
2	DF	(Australia)	Robert Stanton	23	Marconi Fairfield (Australia)	End of Contract	Pre-season	Free	
11	MF	(Australia)	Eric Hristodoulou	25	Marconi Fairfield (Australia)	Transfer	Pre-season	$23,000	
6	MF	(North Macedonia)	Ljupčo Naumovski	29	Wollongong City (Australia)	End of Contract	Pre-season	Free	
9	FW	(Australia)	Tony Krslovic	26	Leichhardt Tigers (Australia)	End of Contract	Pre-season	Free	
	FW	(Australia)	Matthew Zec	22	Leichhardt Tigers (Australia)	End of Contract	Pre-season	Free	

=== Mid-Season Gains ===
No.	Pos.	Nat.	Name	Age	Moving from	Type	Transfer window	Ends	Transfer fee	Source
7	MF	(Australia)	Aytek Genc	29	Pkenj FC (Malaysia)	Transfer	Mid-season		Free	
22	MF	(Australia)	Mirko Jurilj	21	Pkenj FC (Malaysia)	Transfer	Mid-season		Free	
13	MF	(Australia)	Jim Patikas	32	Kastoria (Greece)	Transfer	Mid-season		Free	

=== Mid-Season Losses ===
No.	Pos.	Nat.	Name	Age	Moving to	Type	Transfer window	Transfer fee	Source
13	FW	(Australia)	Mario Jermen	20	Wollongong City (Australia)	Loan	Mid-season	Free	
19	DF	(Australia)	Joe Vrkic	19	Wollongong City (Australia)	Loan	Mid-season	Free	

== Competitions ==
=== Overview ===
Competition	First match	Last match	Starting round	Final position	Record							
Competition	First match	Last match	Starting round	Final position	Pld	W	D	L	GF	GA	GD	Win %
National Soccer League	8 October 1995	28 April 1996	Matchday 1	6th	33	14	12	7	47	33	+14	42.42
Final Series	5 May 1995	15 May 1995	Elimination Final	Minor Semi-Final	3	1	0	2	4	5	−1	33.33
Johnny Walker Cup	14 January 1996	20 January 1996	First round	First Round	2	0	1	1	1	3	−2	0.00
Waratah Cup	10 September 1995	1 October 1995	Round 6	Winners	4	4	0	0	8	2	+6	100.00
Total					42	19	13	10	60	43	+17	45.24

Last updated: complete
Source: Competitions

=== National Soccer League ===
==== League table ====
Pos	Team	Pld	W	D	L	GF	GA	GD	Pts	Qualification
1	Marconi Fairfield	33	17	9	7	58	35	+23	60	Qualification for the Finals series
2	Melbourne Knights (C)	33	17	8	8	50	28	+22	59	Qualification for the Finals series
3	UTS Olympic	33	17	8	8	55	41	+14	59	Qualification for the Finals series
4	Brisbane Strikers	33	17	6	10	54	35	+19	57	Qualification for the Finals series
5	Adelaide City	33	15	9	9	65	40	+25	54	Qualification for the Finals series
6	Sydney United	33	14	12	7	47	33	+14	54	Qualification for the Finals series
7	West Adelaide	33	16	5	12	49	43	+6	53	
8	South Melbourne	33	14	4	15	50	56	−6	46	
9	Canberra Cosmos	33	8	11	14	48	61	−13	35	
10	Morwell Falcons	33	9	8	16	35	65	−30	35	
11	Wollongong City	33	5	5	23	31	63	−32	20	
12	Newcastle Breakers	33	4	5	24	35	77	−42	17	

Updated to match(es) played on unknown. Source: rsssf.com
Rules for classification: 1) points; 2) goal difference; 3) number of goals scored.
(C) Champions

==== Matches ====
8 October 1995 1	Sydney United	0–0	West Adelaide Sharks	Edensor Park, New South Wales
		Report		Stadium: Sydney United Sports Centre; Attendance: 4,160; Referee: Mark Shields

14 October 1995 2	Canberra Cosmos	0–0	Sydney United	Bruce, Australian Capital Territory
		Report		Stadium: Bruce Stadium; Attendance: 5,490; Referee: Con Diomis

1 November 1995 3	Sydney United	1–0	Brisbane Strikers	Edensor Park, New South Wales
	Zdrilic 76'	Report		Stadium: Sydney United Sports Centre; Attendance: 2,296; Referee: Brett Hugo

20 October 1995 4	Wollongong City	0–1	Sydney United	Fairy Meadow, New South Wales
		Report	Z.Babic 55'	Stadium: Brandon Park; Attendance: 2,506; Referee: Brett Hugo

29 October 1995 5	Sydney United	1–2	Newcastle Breakers	Edensor Park, New South Wales
	Rudan 39'	Report	Bennett 34'; Lowe 62 (pen)'	Stadium: Sydney United Sports Centre; Attendance: 4,716; Referee: D.Crawford

5 November 1995 6	South Melbourne	0–2	Sydney United	Melbourne, Victoria
		Report	Markovac 25'; Zdrilic 51'	Stadium: Olympic Park; Attendance: 3,295; Referee: Eugene Brazzale

12 November 1995 7	Sydney United	2–0	Melbourne Knights	Edensor Park, New South Wales
	Zdrilic 49'; Z.Babic 64'	Report		Stadium: Sydney United Sports Centre; Attendance: 5,211; Referee: Con Diomis

19 November 1995 8	UTS Olympic	2–2	Sydney United	Lilyfield, New South Wales
	Trajanovski 89', 97'	Report	Milicic 10', 29'	Stadium: Leichhardt Oval; Attendance: 7,133; Referee: Brett Hugo

25 November 1995 9	Sydney United	0–2	Morwell Falcons	Edensor Park, New South Wales
		Report	Douglas 49'; Miller 89'	Stadium: Sydney United Sports Centre; Attendance: 4,321; Referee: J.Papancolas

2 December 1995 10	Marconi Fairfield	1–1	Sydney United	Bossley Park, New South Wales
	Renaud 72'	Report	Bilokapic 22'	Stadium: Marconi Stadium; Attendance: 8,196; Referee: Con Diomis

6 December 1995 11	Adelaide City	2–2	Sydney United	Hindmarsh, South Australia
	Mori 1', 26'	Report	Lamond 40'; Genc 91'	Stadium: Hindmarsh Stadium; Attendance: 4,246; Referee: Eddie Lennie

10 December 1995 12	West Adelaide Sharks	0–1	Sydney United	Hindmarsh, South Australia
		Report	Markovac 82'	Stadium: Hindmarsh Stadium; Attendance: 3,904; Referee: W.Dade

16 December 1995 13	Sydney United	3–0	Canberra Cosmos	Edensor Park, New South Wales
	Popovic 24 (pen)', 52 (pen)'; Lamond 65'	Report		Stadium: Sydney Croatian Sports Centre; Attendance: 4,984; Referee: Shaun Micallef

22 December 1995 14	Brisbane Strikers	4–0	Sydney United	Brisbane, Queensland
	Farina 22', 80', 86'; Hunter 90'	Report		Stadium: Suncorp Stadium; Attendance: 2,282; Referee: Mark Shield

26 December 1995 15	Sydney United	3–0	Wollongong City	Edensor Park, New South Wales
	Popovic 50', 80 (pen)'; Markovac 58'	Report		Stadium: Sydney United Sports Centre; Attendance: 3,950; Referee: Brett Hugo

29 December 1995 16	Newcastle Breakers	1–1	Sydney United	Newcastle, New South Wales
	James 89'	Report	Zdrilic 7'	Stadium: Breakers Stadium; Attendance: 4,038; Referee: D.Crawford

6 January 1996 17	Sydney United	4–1	South Melbourne	Edensor Park, New South Wales
	Milicic 46', 85', 87'; Lamond 81'	Report	Trimboli 63'	Stadium: Sydney United Sports Centre; Attendance: 2,825; Referee: Eddie Lennie

4 February 1996 18	Melbourne Knights	0–0	Sydney United	Sunshine North, Victoria
		Report		Stadium: Melbourne Croatian Sports Centre; Attendance: 5,830; Referee: Eugene Brazzale

11 February 1995 19	Sydney United	1–2	UTS Olympic	Edensor Park, New South Wales
	Z.Babic 67'	Report	Poimer 51'; Trajanovski 89'	Stadium: Sydney Croatian Sports Centre; Attendance: 9,170; Referee: Simon Micallef

17 February 1996 20	Morwell Falcons	0–0	Sydney United	Morwell, Victoria
		Report		Stadium: Falcons Park; Attendance: 2,693; Referee: Gerry Connelly

24 February 1996 21	Marconi Fairfield	3–1	Sydney United	Bossley Park, New South Wales
	Maloney 36'; Awaritefe 46'; Renaud 85'	Report	Z.Babic 43'	Stadium: Marconi Stadium; Attendance: 6,897; Referee: Simon Micallef

2 March 1996 22	Sydney United	2–2	Adelaide City	Edensor Park, New South Wales
	Kuprešak 51'; Patikas 73'	Report	Mori 41'; Foster 75'	Stadium: Sydney Croatian Sports Centre; Attendance: 3,257; Referee: John Fraser

9 March 1996 23	Sydney United	3–0	West Adelaide Sharks	Edensor Park, New South Wales
	Rudan 1'; C.Gibson 44'; Plesa 86'	Report		Stadium: Sydney United Sports Centre; Attendance: 2,798; Referee: Con Diomis

13 March 1996 24	Canberra Cosmos	1–1	Sydney United	Bruce, Australian Capital Territory
	Popovic (og) 9'	Report	Lamond 85'	Stadium: Bruce Stadium; Attendance: 1,498; Referee: Mark Shield

16 March 1996 25	Sydney United	1–0	Brisbane Strikers	Edensor Park, New South Wales
	Zdrilic 88'	Report		Stadium: Sydney Croatian Sports Centre; Attendance: 3,719; Referee: Simon Micallef

22 March 1996 26	Wollongong City	1–1	Sydney United	Fairy Meadow, New South Wales
	Perenich 9'	Report	Genc 17'	Stadium: Brandon Park; Attendance: 3,002; Referee: Con Diomis

20 March 1996 27	Sydney United	3–0	Newcastle Breakers	Edensor Park, New South Wales
	Genc 10'; Lamond 34'; Zdrilic 68'	Report		Stadium: Sydney United Sports Centre; Attendance: 2,918; Referee: Brett Hugo

31 March 1996 28	South Melbourne	1–2	Sydney United	Albert Park, Victoria
	Damianos 60'	Report	Lamond 4'; Z.Babic 85'	Stadium: Bob Jane Stadium; Attendance: 5,013; Referee: John Fraser

6 April 1996 29	Sydney United	2–4	Melbourne Knights	Edensor Park, New South Wales
	Milicic 18'; Moric 37'	Report	A.Cervinski 9'; Kutlesovic 88'; Marth 85'; T.Pondeljak 88'	Stadium: Sydney United Sports Centre; Attendance: 4,918; Referee: Simon Micallef

8 April 1996 30	UTS Olympic	1–0	Sydney United	Lilyfield, New South Wales
	Taliadoros 88'	Report		Stadium: Leichhardt Oval; Attendance: 8,672; Referee: Brett Hugo

14 April 1996 31	Sydney United	2–1	Morwell Falcons	Edensor Park, New South Wales
	Zdrilic 15'; Z.Babic 65'	Report	Villani 64'	Stadium: Sydney United Sports Centre; Attendance: 3,289; Referee: Eddie Brazzale

21 April 1996 32	Sydney United	1–1	Marconi Fairfield	Edensor Park, New South Wales
	Markovac 72'	Report	Awaritefe 59'	Stadium: Sydney United Sports Centre; Attendance: 6,910; Referee: John Fraser

28 April 1996 33	Adelaide City	1–3	Sydney United	Hindmarsh, South Australia
	Tobin 11 (pen)'	Report	Zdrilic 3'; Kuprešak 50'; Lamond 58'	Stadium: Hindmarsh Stadium; Attendance: 7,329; Referee: Eddie Lennie

5 May 1996 Elimination Final - 1st Leg	Sydney United	2–0	Brisbane Strikers	Edensor Park, New South Wales
18:00	Zdrilic 13'; Moric 59'	Report		Stadium: Sydney United Sports Centre; Attendance: 2,848; Referee: Eugene Brazzale

12 May 1996 Elimination Final - 2nd Leg	Brisbane Strikers	1–2	Sydney United	Brisbane, Queensland
19:00	Farina 44'	Report	Lamond 83'; Moric 87'	Stadium: Suncorp Stadium; Attendance: 8,727; Referee: Brett Hugo

15 May 1996 Minor Semi-Final	Adelaide City	1–0	Sydney United	Hindmarsh, South Australia
19:30	Armour 44'	Report		Stadium: Hindmarsh Stadium; Attendance: 6,260; Referee: Brett Hugo

=== Johnny Walker Cup ===
14 January 1996 First round 1st Leg	Marconi Fairfield	1–1	Sydney United	Bossley Park, New South Wales
	Maloney 38'	Report	Z.Babic 24'	Stadium: Marconi Stadium; Attendance: 5,012; Referee: John Fraser

20 January 1996 First round 2nd Leg	Sydney United	0–2	Marconi Fairfield	Edensor Park, New South Wales
		Report	Awaritefe 19'; Stanton 59'	Stadium: Sydney United Sports Centre; Attendance: 1,836; Referee: Shaun Micallef

=== Waratah Cup ===
10 September 1995 Sixth round	Sydney United	2–0	Blacktown City Demons	Edensor Park, New South Wales
15:00	Z.Babic ?', ?'	Report		Stadium: Sydney United Sports Centre

17 September 1995 Quarter Finals	Sydney United	2–1	Canberra Cosmos	Bossley Park, New South Wales
	Z.Babic 17'; Gibson 50'	Report	Baxter 51'	Stadium: Marconi Stadium

23 September 1995 Semi Finals	Parramatta Eagles	0–2	Sydney United	South Granville, New South Wales
		Report	Milicic ?'; Moric ?'	Stadium: Melita Stadium

1 October 1995 Final	Sydney United	2–1	Canterbury Marrickville FC	Bossley Park, New South Wales
	Z.Babic ?'; Moric ?'	Report		Stadium: Marconi Stadium

== Statistics ==
=== Appearances and goals ===
Players with no appearances not included in the list.

No.	Pos.	Nat.	Name	National Soccer League		Final Series		Johhny Walker Cup		Waratah Cup		Total					
No.	Pos.	Nat.	Name	1	GK	(Australia)	John Perosh	26	0	3	0	0	0	0	0	29	0
2	DF	(Australia)	Robert Trajkovski	11	0	3	0	0	0	1	0	15	0				
3	DF	(Croatia)	Velimir Kuprešak	32	1	3	0	2	0	0	0	37	1				
4	MF	(Australia)	Tony Popovic	26	4	3	0	0	0	0	0	29	4				
5	DF	(Australia)	Mark Babic	29	0	2	0	0	0	0	0	31	0				
6	MF	(Australia)	Robert Enes	30	0	2	0	2	0	0	0	34	0				
7	MF	(Australia)	Aytek Genc	19	3	0	0	2	0	0	0	21	3				
8	MF	(Australia)	Ante Moric	22	1	2	2	0	0	4	2	28	5				
9	MF	(Australia)	Robert Markovac	23	4	3	0	1	0	0	0	27	4				
10	FW	(Australia)	Ante Milicic	32	6	3	0	0	0	4	1	39	7				
11	MF	(Australia)	Dominic Ušalj	7	0	0	0	0	0	0	0	7	0				
12	DF	(Australia)	Marko Rudan	19	2	1	0	1	0	0	0	21	2				
13	MF	(Australia)	Jim Patikas	17	1	1	0	1	0	0	0	19	1				
14	FW	(Australia)	David Zdrilic	32	9	3	1	2	0	4	0	41	10				
15	FW	(Australia)	Zeljko Babic	26	6	3	0	2	1	4	4	35	11				
16	FW	(Papua New Guinea)	Manis Lamond	24	7	3	1	1	0	0	0	28	8				
17	DF	(Australia)	Paul Bilokapic	26	1	1	0	0	0	0	0	27	1				
18	MF	(Australia)	Richard Plesa	19	1	0	0	2	0	0	0	21	1				
20	GK	(Australia)	Andrew Crews	7	0	0	0	2	0	0	0	9	0				
21	DF	(Australia)	James Aschner	2	0	0	0	1	0	0	0	3	0				
22	MF	(Australia)	Mirko Jurilj	1	0	0	0	1	0	0	0	2	0				
23	DF	(Australia)	Chad Gibson	9	1	3	0	2	0	4	1	18	2				
—	MF	(Australia)	Jacob Burns	0	0	0	0	1	0	0	0	1	0				
—	DF	(Australia)	Joe Vrkic	0	0	0	0	2	0	0	0	2	0				
