= Željko Babić =

Željko Babić may refer to:

- Zeljko Babic (born 1976), Australian soccer player
- Željko Babić (handballer) (born 1972), Croatian handball player and coach
