= Vanja Iveša =

Croatian footballer (born 1977)

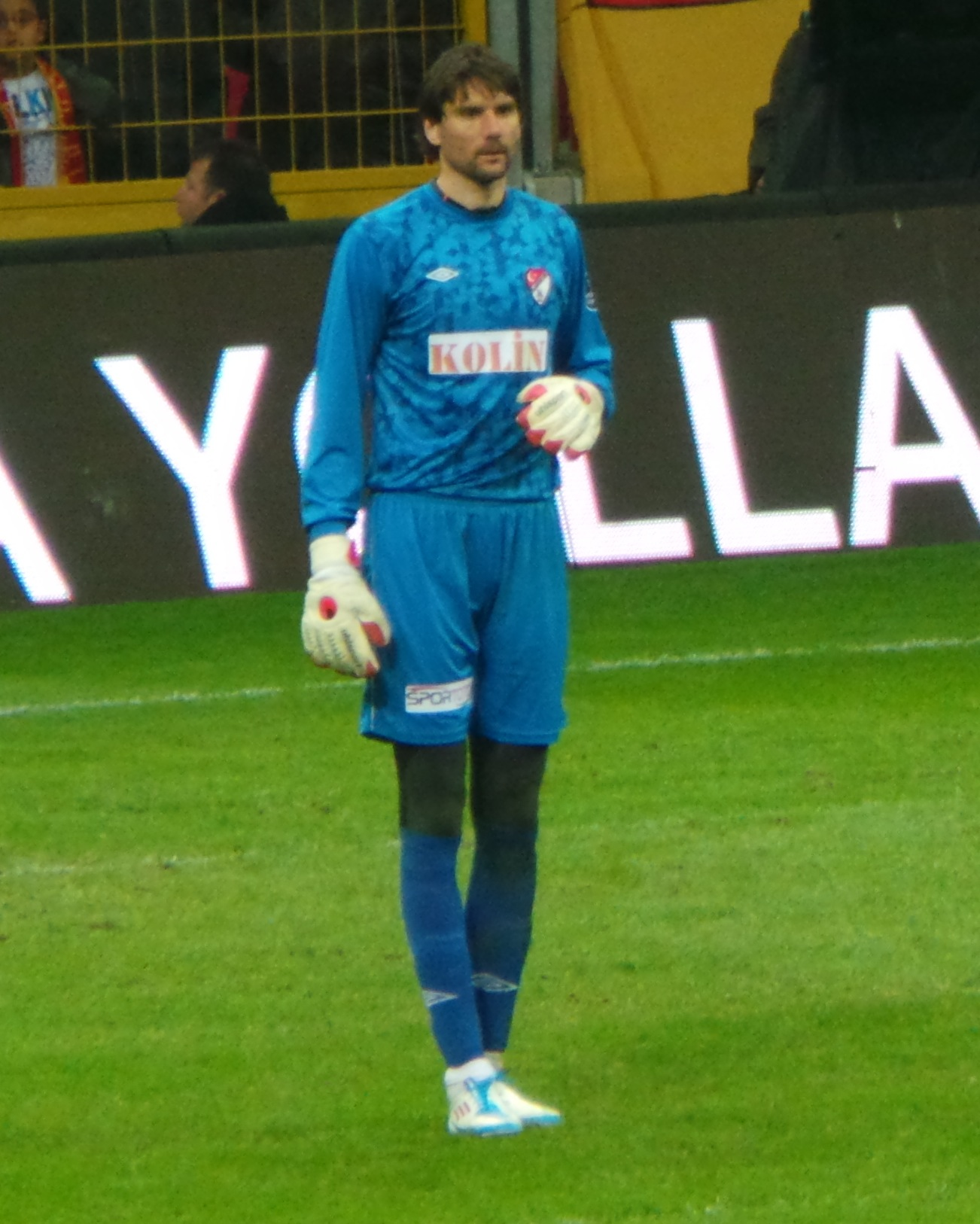

Personal information
- Date of birth: 21 July 1977 (age 49)
- Place of birth: Pula, SR Croatia, Yugoslavia
- Height: 2.05 m (6 ft 9 in)
- Position: Goalkeeper

Youth career
- Istra

Senior career*
Years	Team	Apps	(Gls)
1995–1997	Istra	4	(0)
1997–2001	Rijeka	1	(0)
2001–2002	Novalja	24	(0)
2002–2003	Sydney United	24	(0)
2003–2004	Žminj	18	(0)
2004–2007	Pula	85	(0)
2007–2008	Slaven Belupo	29	(0)
2008–2012	Eskişehirspor	131	(0)
2012–2015	Elazığspor	77	(0)
2015	Opatija	14	(0)
2015–2017	Istra 1961	35	(0)
2017–2018	Opatija	15	(0)
2018	Istra 1961	10	(0)
2018–2021	Opatija	68	(0)
- * Club domestic league appearances and goals as of 30 May 2021

Vanja Iveša (born 21 July 1977) is a Croatian retired footballer who played as a goalkeeper.

== Club career ==
Over 2 meters tall, Iveša's career spanned over 26 years of professional football, during which he played for numerous clubs in Croatia, Turkey and Australia. On 17 February 2018, Iveša became the oldest ever player to have played in the Croatian First Football League.
