= Peter Blazincic =

Australian soccer player (born 1969)

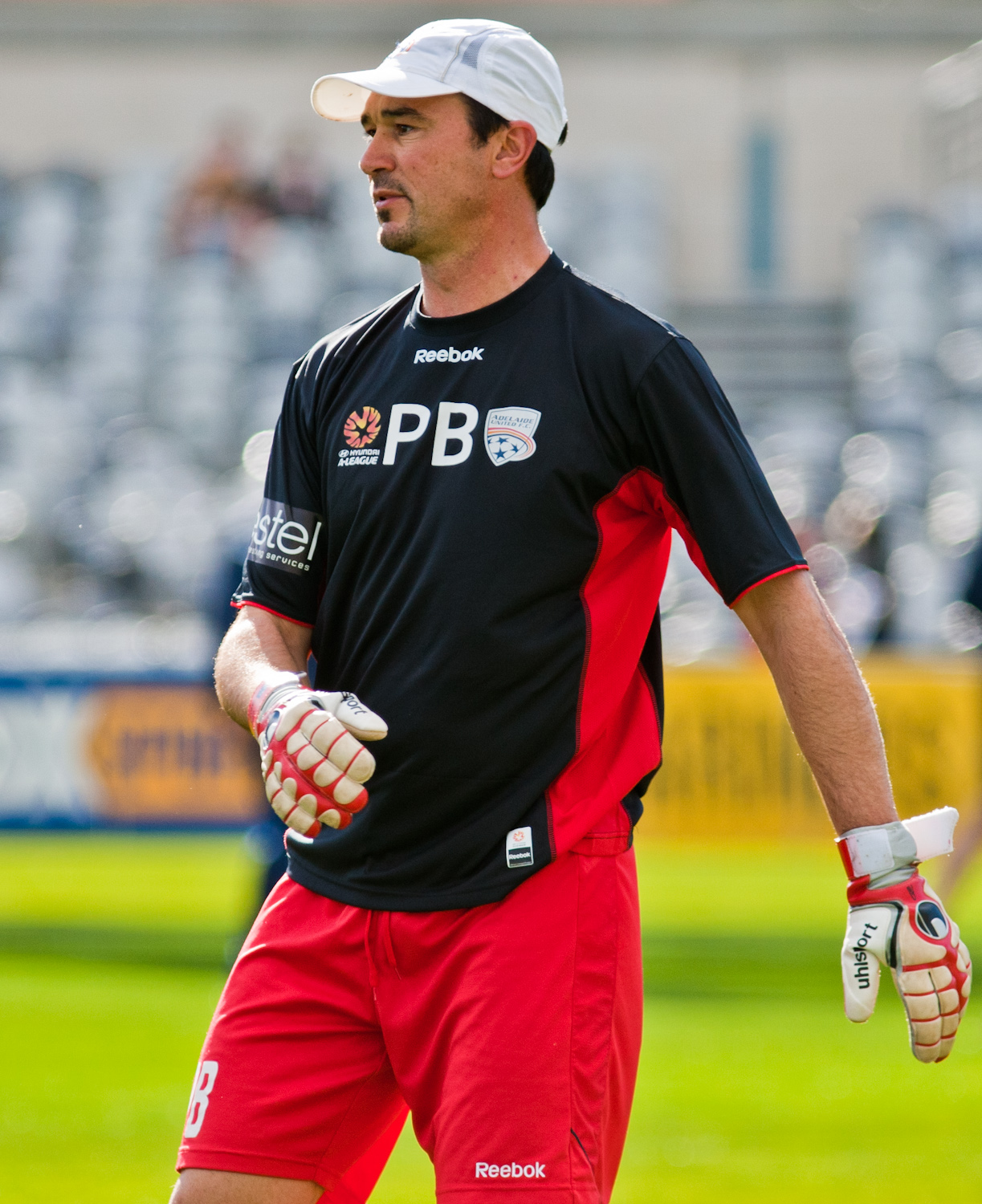

Personal information
- Date of birth: 29 May 1969 (age 57)
- Place of birth: Adelaide, Australia
- Position: Goalkeeper

Senior career*
Years	Team	Apps	(Gls)
1990–1991	Croatia	44	(0)
1991–1996	West Adelaide	121	(0)
1992	→ Para Hills (loan)	16	(0)
1993	→ Croatia (loan)	7	(0)
1996-1997	Sydney United	0	(0)
1997–1998	Guangzhou Apollo	40	(0)
1998–1999	Northern Spirit	0	(0)
1999–2000	West Adelaide	0	(0)
2000	Adelaide Raiders	10	(0)
- * Club domestic league appearances and goals

Peter Blazincic (born 29 May 1969), is an Australian former football (soccer) goalkeeper, now the goalkeeping coach at A-League side Adelaide United FC.

He used to play for Guangzhou Apollo in Chinese Jia-A League and is regarded as one of the best foreign players in Guangzhou football history.
