= Damir Cvetko =

Croatian footballer

Personal information
- Date of birth: 27 June 1968 (age 58)
- Position: Midfielder

Senior career*
Years	Team	Apps	(Gls)
1992–1993	Radnik	16	(2)
1994–1995	Zadar	13	(4)
1995–1996	Varteks	1	(0)
1996–1997	Sydney United Pumas		
- * Club domestic league appearances and goals

Damir Cvetko (born 27 June 1968) is a retired Croatian football midfielder.
