= Robert Markovac =

Australian soccer player

Personal information
- Date of birth: 21 June 1967 (age 59)
- Place of birth: Australia
- Position: Midfielder

Youth career
- Melbourne Croatia

Senior career*
Years	Team	Apps	(Gls)
1987–1988	Sunshine George Cross		
1989–1991	Preston Makedonia	25	(4)
1991–1992	Brisbane United		
1992–1993	Hajduk Split	10	(1)
1993–1994	Waterford United	4	(0)
1995–1997	Sydney United	36	(4)
1997–1998	Guangzhou Apollo	13	(1)
1998	Green Gully	12	(0)
1998–1999	Carlton S.C.	14	(1)
- * Club domestic league appearances and goals

Robert Markovac (born 21 June 1967) is a retired Australian soccer player who played as a midfielder.
