= Zlatko Arambasic =

Australian soccer player and educator

Zlatko Arambašić
Personal information
- Full name: Zlatko Arambašić
- Date of birth: 20 September 1969 (age 57)
- Place of birth: Split, SFR Yugoslavia
- Height: 1.87 m (6 ft 2 in)
- Position: Striker

Senior career*
Years	Team	Apps	(Gls)
1986–1988	Canterbury-Marrickville	1	(0)
1989–1990	Blacktown City Demons	44	(14)
1990–1992	Mechelen	5	(3)
1992–1993	Sydney Olympic	18	(9)
1993–1994	Mechelen	15	(3)
1994–1995	FC Metz	4	(0)
1995–1996	Oostende	20	(21)
1996–1997	NAC	10	(3)
1997–1998	RBC	12	(2)
1998–1999	Mechelen	18	(12)
1999–2000	Sydney Olympic	29	(9)
2000–2001	Sydney United	22	(6)
2001–2002	Parramatta Power	12	(3)
2002–2003	APIA Leichhardt Tigers	38	(19)

International career
1992	Australia	4	(1)

Managerial career
- 2005–2006: Sydney United
- 2017-: Hakoah Sydney City East
- * Club domestic league appearances and goals

Zlatko Arambašić (born 20 September 1969, often Anglicised to Arambasic) is a former Australian football player. Mainly a forward, he could be deployed as a second striker or winger

He began his senior career at Canterbury-Marrickville, and in 1988 signed for NSL club Blacktown City Demons for an undisclosed fee. He spent most of his time in Belgium playing with Mechelen and Oostende. In September 1994, he signed for FC Metz on a year deal. He played for several clubs in Europe and in Australia.

Arambašić made his senior international debut for Australia in 1992. He made a total of 4 appearances for Australia.

== Club career ==
=== Early career ===
Arambašić began his career in Croatia at his local football club in Split and briefly played for Canterbury-Marrickville before making a name for himself with successful spells at Blacktown City Demons.

=== Blacktown City Demons ===
Arambašić's performances and record of 14 goals in 44 games in two National Soccer League (NSL) seasons earned him a move to Belgian Pro League side Mechelen in 1990. After two seasons at Mechelan, Arambasić moved to Australian side Sydney Olympic.

=== KV Mechelen ===
Arambašić's return to Australia got him a return to the Belgian side Mechelen. Arambasić signed a year-long deal. After a year spell at Mechelen, he signed for French Ligue 1 side FC Metz.

== International career ==
He played at the 1992 Summer Olympics but never a full international for the senior team.

=== International ===
Appearances and goals by national team and year
National team	Year	Apps	Goals			
Australia	1992	4	1	Total	4	1

Scores and results list Australia's goal tally first, score column indicates score after each Arambasić goal.

List of international goals scored by Zlatko Arambašić
No.	Date	Venue	Opponent	Score	Result	Competition
1	28 July 1992	Camp Nou, Barcelona, Spain	Mexico	0–1	1–1	1992 Summer Olympics

== Personal life ==
Zlatko Arambašić has one child, Marco. Zlatko is of Croatian descent. After Zlatko's retirement from professional football, he decided to take upon teaching, where for eighteen years he had been working as a PDHPE teacher at Trinity Grammar School in Sydney's inner West since 2000. In 2024, he departed Trinity Grammar, and took up a role at Scots College, as Head of Football, and PDHPE teacher.
