= Allan Picken =

Australian soccer player

Personal information
- Full name: Allan Picken
- Date of birth: 7 September 1981 (age 45)
- Place of birth: Sydney, Australia
- Height: 1.89 m (6 ft 2 1/2 in)
- Position: Defender

Youth career
- Sydney United

Senior career*
Years	Team	Apps	(Gls)
1999–2000	Penrith Panthers	24	(5)
2000–2001	Sydney United	3	(0)
2001–2002	AC United	14	(1)
2001–2002	A.P.I.A. Leichhardt Tigers	21	(7)
2002–2004	Canterbury-Marrickville	43	(9)
2004	Schofield Scorpions	14	(5)
2004–2005	Sydney United		
2005–2006	Newcastle United Jets	22	(0)
2006–2007	Walsall	2	(0)
- * Club domestic league appearances and goals as of 6 August 2007

Allan Picken (born 7 September 1981 in New South Wales, Sydney) is an Australian footballer.

== Biography ==
Picken started his career at Sydney FC playing in the youth team but moved to Newcastle Jets after then manager Richard Money signed him. On 31 July 2006, Picken moved to England to once again link up with manager Richard Money who paid for A$50,000 (£20,390) for the defender's services. He only managed two appearances for the Saddlers due to a long-term knee problem aggravated by playing and making his debut against Rochdale on the opening day of the 2006–2007 season in which Walsall won 1-0 thanks to a Martin Butler goal. Picken's Walsall contract was ended in April 2007, three months before it was due to expire. Picken moved back to Australia to fully recover from his knee problem.
