= Shane Webb =

Australian soccer player

Personal information
- Full name: Shane Webb
- Date of birth: 14 September 1980 (age 46)
- Place of birth: Melbourne, Australia
- Position: Defender

Senior career*
Years	Team	Apps	(Gls)
2000	Manly-Warringah Sea Eagles	20	(0)
2000–2001	Sydney United	20	(0)
2001–2004	Marconi Stallions	61	(3)
2004–2005	Bankstown City Lions	22	(?)
2006–2007	Newcastle United Jets	2	(0)
2007–2009	Bankstown City Lions	40	(?)
2010–2011	Bonnyrigg White Eagles	39	(1)
2012–2013	Marconi Stallions	26	(1)
2014	Bankstown City	19	(4)
2015	Sutherland Sharks	3	(0)
2015	Mounties Wanderers	12	(1)
2016	Rydalmere Lions	21	(3)
2017–2018	Marconi Stallions	17	(0)
2018	Bankstown United	10	(1)
- * Club domestic league appearances and goals as of 4 October 2018 ‡ National team caps and goals as of 24 March 2010

Shane Webb (born 14 September 1980) is an Australian footballer who plays for Marconi Stallions.
