= Goran Talevski =

Australian soccer player

Personal information
- Date of birth: 20 May 1982 (age 44)
- Place of birth: Australia
- Position: Midfielder

Senior career*
Years	Team	Apps	(Gls)
2000–2001	Sydney United 58 FC	19	(1)
2001	Hajduk Wanderers (loan)		
2001–2002	Sydney United 58 FC	17	(0)
2002–2003	Marconi Stallions FC	5	(0)
2002–2003	Rockdale City Suns FC	10	(3)
2003-2004	HNK Hajduk Split	8	(0)
2004–2006	HNK Šibenik		
2006	Melbourne Knights		
2007	Altona Magic		
2007	Caroline Springs George Cross FC		
2008	Whittlesea Zebras		
2010	Hume City FC		
2010	Altona Magic SC		
- * Club domestic league appearances and goals

Goran Talevski (born 20 May 1982) is an Australian retired soccer player.

== Career ==
In 2003, Talevski signed for HNK Hajduk Split, one of the most successful teams in Croatia. He liked the full-time environment there, saying that "training sometime three times a day was excellent for me". However, he left due to financial problems and trialed with Brisbane Roar in the newly formed Australian A-League, but failed to land a contract.

In 2007, Talevski was regarded as one of the top 10 players in Australia outside of the A-League.
