= Mirko Jurilj =

Australian soccer player (born 1973)

Personal information
- Date of birth: 4 November 1973 (age 52)
- Place of birth: Australia
- Positions: Defender; midfielder

Youth career
- Hurstville Boys

Senior career*
Years	Team	Apps	(Gls)
1992–1993	Sydney Croatia		
1993	Wollongong United		
1994–1996	Johor FC		
1997	Sydney United		
1998	Johor FC		
1999	Sembawang Rangers		
1999–2000	Sydney United		
2000	Sembawang Rangers		
2001	Hurstville ZSC		
2001–2002	Parramatta Eagles		
2002	Fraser Park FC		
2002–2003	Pietà Hotspurs		
2003	Sutherland Sharks		
2003	Wollongong City		
2004	St George FC		
- Hurstville ZSC
- St George FC
2006–2007	Blacktown City FC		
2008–2009	Sydney Olympic FC		
2010	Blacktown City FC		
2011	Rockdale City Suns FC		
2014	St George FC	14	(0)
- * Club domestic league appearances and goals

Mirko Jurij (born 4 November 1973) is an Australian retired footballer who played as a defender or midfielder.

== Career ==
=== Singapore ===
Convicted of attempting to fix a match while with Sembawang Rangers in autumn 2000, Jurilj failed to make the 22000 Singaporean dollars as his three bets did not come true and was sentenced to five months' jail by December where he shared a cell with six others, had to serve laundry duty, and became increasingly ill at one point. Despite claiming to not tried to have fixed a match, the Australian was never vindicated and was banned for life from Asian football but not worldwide, with FIFA saying that the ban was enough punishment. However, the Australian was banned worldwide in late June 2001 for seven months, which ended prematurely, ending during mid-August the same year.

=== Malaysia ===
A member of Johor in 1995 and 1996, the defender-cum-midfielder was set to be bought by the Southern Tigers for the 2004 Malaysia Premier League, but they reversed on the offer at the beginning of 2004.

=== Malta ===
Transferring to Pieta Hotspurs of the Maltese Premier League in summer 2002, Jurilj was named man of the match twice in his first three outings, solidifying his place in defense for the first team and drawing comparisons with Romanian import Lucian Dronca. Settling well into the country, he stated that "The overall technical ability of the players is quite good but what the teams here (in Malta) lack is physical preparation." Suspended for once for making insulting remarks to the referee, he split ways with Hotspurs at the start of 2003.
