= Commins Menapi =

Solomon Island footballer (1977–2017)

Personal information
- Date of birth: 18 September 1977
- Place of birth: Lata, Temotu Province, Solomon Islands
- Date of death: 18 November 2017 (aged 40)
- Place of death: Honiara, Solomon Islands
- Height: 1.85 m (6 ft 1 in)
- Position: Striker

Senior career*
Years	Team	Apps	(Gls)
1998–1999	Marist	8	(15)
1999–2000	Nelson Suburbs	3	(0)
2000–2003	Sydney United	66	(19)
2003	Marist	0	(0)
2004–2006	JP Su'uria	0	(0)
2006–2007	YoungHeart Manawatu	21	(12)
2007–2008	Waitakere United	39	(21)
2008–2010	Marist		
2011	Bundaberg Spirit		
2012–2013	Marist		
2013	Western United		

International career
2000–2009	Solomon Islands	37	(34)
Medal record
Men's football
Representing Solomon Islands
OFC Nations Cup
Runner-up	2004 Australia
Third place	2000 Tahiti
- * Club domestic league appearances and goals

Commins Menapi (18 September 1977 – 18 November 2017) was a Solomon Islands football player and manager who played as a striker. As manager of Western United, he guided the club to their first and only Telekom S league title in the 2014–15 season.

== Club career ==
Menapi played for YoungHeart Manawatu in New Zealand, Sydney United of the old National Soccer League in Australia and for Marist FC, a club from the Solomon Islands.

In the 2006–2007 season, he became the first player to be sent off in a New Zealand Football Championship Grand Final with a nasty studs up kick on Auckland City defender Riki van Steeden. Van Steeden's leg was broken in the incident and Waitakere United lost the final 3–2 however, he would not be suspended for the OFC Champions League final against Ba F.C. because of the OFC and New Zealand Football being two separate organisations. Commins rejoined Solomon Islands team Marist FC after a period spent as a free agent.

== International career ==
Menapi represented the Solomon Islands national team on 37 occasions, scoring a record 34 goals (including 7 against non-FIFA members). Menapi was arguably the most famous Solomon Islands footballer, after scoring twice for his country against Australia in a sensational 2–2 draw in the Oceania Nations Cup group match in 2004. The result was the only game in the competition that Australia did not win, and the result also ensured Solomon Islands' progression to the next phase at the expense of New Zealand. In that tournament, Menapi scored four goals in six games. Since Australia's exit from the Oceania Football Confederation in 2006 to join Asian Football Confederation, he became the all-time leading goal scorer for the OFC until Chris Wood of New Zealand reached his record of 34 goals on the 13 October 2023 and until Roy Krishna of Fiji surpassed both of them to break the record on the 18 November 2023.

== Death ==
Menapi died in Honiara in November 2017 at the age of 40, in the early hours of the day, of an undisclosed cause.

== Career statistics ==
Scores and results list Solomon Islands' goal tally first, score column indicates score after each Menapi goal.

List of international goals scored by Commins Menapi
No.	Date	Venue	Opponent	Score	Result	Competition
1	21 June 2000	Stade Pater, Papeete, Tahiti	Cook Islands	2–0	5–1	2000 OFC Nations Cup
2	28 June 2000	Stade Pater, Papeete, Tahiti	Vanuatu	1–1	2–1	2000 OFC Nations Cup
3	4 June 2001	North Harbour Stadium, Auckland, New Zealand	Cook Islands	2–1	9–1	2002 FIFA World Cup qualification
4	4 June 2001	North Harbour Stadium, Auckland, New Zealand	Cook Islands	5–1	9–1	2002 FIFA World Cup qualification
5	4 June 2001	North Harbour Stadium, Auckland, New Zealand	Cook Islands	6–1	9–1	2002 FIFA World Cup qualification
6	8 June 2001	North Harbour Stadium, Auckland, New Zealand	Vanuatu	2–1	7–2	2002 FIFA World Cup qualification
7	8 June 2001	North Harbour Stadium, Auckland, New Zealand	Vanuatu	6–2	7–2	2002 FIFA World Cup qualification
8	7 July 2002	North Harbour Stadium, Auckland, New Zealand	Tahiti	2–1	2–3	2002 OFC Nations Cup
9	14 June 2003	Sir John Guise Stadium, Port Moresby, Papua New Guinea	Papua New Guinea	5–3	5–3	Friendly
10	14 June 2003	Sir John Guise Stadium, Port Moresby, Papua New Guinea	Papua New Guinea	5–3	5–3	Friendly
11	1 July 2003	ANZ National Stadium, Suva, Fiji	Vanuatu	1–2	2–2	2003 South Pacific Games
12	1 July 2003	ANZ National Stadium, Suva, Fiji	Vanuatu	2–2	2–2	2003 South Pacific Games
13	3 July 2003	ANZ National Stadium, Suva, Fiji	Kiribati	2–0	7–0	2003 South Pacific Games
14	3 July 2003	ANZ National Stadium, Suva, Fiji	Kiribati	3–0	7–0	2003 South Pacific Games
15	3 July 2003	ANZ National Stadium, Suva, Fiji	Kiribati	4–0	7–0	2003 South Pacific Games
16	3 July 2003	ANZ National Stadium, Suva, Fiji	Kiribati	5–0	7–0	2003 South Pacific Games
17	3 July 2003	ANZ National Stadium, Suva, Fiji	Kiribati	6–0	7–0	2003 South Pacific Games
18	5 July 2003	Ratu Cakobau Park, Nausori, Fiji	Tuvalu	2–0	4–0	2003 South Pacific Games
19	5 July 2003	Ratu Cakobau Park, Nausori, Fiji	Tuvalu	4–0	4–0	2003 South Pacific Games
20	7 July 2003	Churchill Park, Lautoka, Fiji	Fiji	1–2	1–2	2003 South Pacific Games
21	3 April 2004	Korman Stadium, Port Vila, Vanuatu	Vanuatu	1–1	2–1	Friendly
22	3 April 2004	Korman Stadium, Port Vila, Vanuatu	Vanuatu	2–1	2–1	Friendly
23	6 April 2004	Korman Stadium, Port Vila, Vanuatu	Vanuatu	2–1	2–1	Friendly
24	2 June 2004	Hindmarsh Stadium, Adelaide, Australia	Tahiti	2–0	4–0	2004 OFC Nations Cup
25	2 June 2004	Hindmarsh Stadium, Adelaide, Australia	Tahiti	4–0	4–0	2004 OFC Nations Cup
26	6 June 2004	Hindmarsh Stadium, Adelaide, Australia	Australia	1–0	2–2	2004 OFC Nations Cup
27	6 June 2004	Hindmarsh Stadium, Adelaide, Australia	Australia	2–2	2–2	2004 OFC Nations Cup
28	25 August 2007	National Soccer Stadium, Apia, Samoa	American Samoa	3–0	12–1	2007 South Pacific Games
29	25 August 2007	National Soccer Stadium, Apia, Samoa	American Samoa	4–0	12–1	2007 South Pacific Games
30	25 August 2007	National Soccer Stadium, Apia, Samoa	American Samoa	8–1	12–1	2007 South Pacific Games
31	25 August 2007	National Soccer Stadium, Apia, Samoa	American Samoa	9–1	12–1	2007 South Pacific Games
32	27 August 2007	National Soccer Stadium, Apia, Samoa	Tonga	1–0	4–0	2007 South Pacific Games
33	27 August 2007	National Soccer Stadium, Apia, Samoa	Tonga	2–0	4–0	2007 South Pacific Games
34	5 September 2007	National Soccer Stadium, Apia, Samoa	New Caledonia	2–1	2–3	2007 South Pacific Games

== Honours ==
Solomon Islands

- OFC Nations Cup: runner-up 2004; third place 2000
