= Nahuel Arrarte =

Argentine football manager (born 1980)

Personal information
- Date of birth: 26 November 1980 (age 45)
- Place of birth: Adrogué, Argentina
- Position: Midfielder

Team information
- Current team: Western Sydney Wanderers (assistant coach)

Senior career*
| Years | Team | Apps | (Gls) |
- Sydney United
- Wollongong Wolves
- Johor
- Marconi Stallions
- Lautoka

Managerial career
- Wollongong Wolves
- Australia Women (assistant)
- Central Coast Mariners (assistant)
- Philippines Women U20
- Western Sydney Wanderers (assistant)
- * Club domestic league appearances and goals

Nahuel Arrarte (born 26 November 1980) is an Argentine football manager and former player who played as a midfielder. He is the assistant coach of Western Sydney Wanderers. He is also a naturalised citizen of Australia.

== Early life ==
Arrarte was born in 1980 in Adrogué, Argentina to a Uruguayan father (from Salto) and an Argentine mother (from Ituzaingó, Buenos Aires), and moved to Australia with his family at the age of eight.

== Club career ==
In 2003, Arrarte signed for Australian side Wollongong Wolves after playing for Australian side Sydney United, where he made over 100 league appearances and was regarded as an experienced National Soccer League player. In 2004, he signed for Malaysian side Johor. After that, he signed for Australian side Marconi Stallions, where he was described as the "cornerstone of the Marconi side over several years". In 2010, he signed for Fijian side Lautoka, becoming the first Argentine player to play in Fiji, and played in the OFC Champions League. In 2013, he retired from professional football.

== Style of play ==
Arrarte could operate as a midfielder or defender and was known for his strength. He was also known for his dribbling ability and shooting ability.

== Managerial career ==
Arrate started his managerial career with Australian side Wollongong Wolves. In 2023, Arrarte was appointed manager of the Philippines women's national under-20 football team. Previously, he was assistant manager of the Australia women's national soccer team. He was also assistant manager of Australian side Central Coast Mariners.

== Personal life ==
He has a younger brother. His son, Tristan Arrarte, plays for the Timor-Leste national team.
