= Aytek Genc =

Australian soccer player and coach

Personal information
- Full name: Aytek Genc
- Date of birth: 3 February 1966 (age 60)
- Place of birth: Ankara, Turkey
- Position: Attacking midfielder

Team information
- Current team: St George Football Association

Youth career
- 1983–1984: Bankstown Soccer Club
- 1985: Marconi Stallions
- 1986: Auburn Uruguay

Senior career*
Years	Team	Apps	(Gls)
1986–1989	Penrith Uruguay	61	(26)
1989–1993	Parramatta Eagles	67	(11)
1994–1995	Johor FC	53	(28)
1995–1996	Sydney United	19	(3)
1996	Johor FC	30	(12)
1996–1997	Sydney United	13	(3)
1997–1998	Johor FC	54	(17)
1999–2002	Sydney United	57	(4)

International career
1991–1997	Australia	3	(1)

Managerial career
- 2002–2004: Sydney United Technical Director Youth Football
- 2004–2005: St. George Assistant Coach
- 2006–2007: Blacktown City Demons
- 2007: Sydney FC Assistant Coach
- 2008: Blacktown City Demons Manager
- 2009: Sydney Olympic FC
- 2010–present: Oakhill College Head Coach
- 2010: Blacktown City Demons
- 2010–present: St. George Football Association Director of Football
- * Club domestic league appearances and goals

Aytek Genc (Turkish: Aytek Genç; born 3 February 1966) is a former Australian soccer player and was the coach of the Sydney Olympic FC in the NSW Premier League. Considered one of the most technically gifted players in the Australian National Soccer League (NSL), he featured in over 350 professional games over a career period of 15 years. Genç won three official caps for the Australia national soccer team and spent five years of his playing career in Malaysia with Johor FC.

== Early career ==
Aytek Genc was born in Ankara, Turkey. He came to Australia as a child. Aytek Genc played his junior football in Sydney's Granville, Nepean and Southern Districts. At the age of 16 (1983) Genc was chosen for the Australian U16 Indoor Soccer team which toured the United States. Genc's first professional contract was in 1984 with the Bankstown Soccer Club in the National Premier Leagues NSW. In 1985, Genc played for the Marconi under 19 team and made his National Soccer League debut in the final game of the season. Between 1986 and 1989 Genç played for the Penrith Uruguay club in the National Premier Leagues NSW.

== National League and overseas career ==
At age 22 Genc joined Parramatta Eagles then coached by Raul Blanco and played his first full season in the Australian NSL. Genc became a favourite of the Parramatta fans and was known for his speed and skill on the ball. Genc came to the attention of the then National Team coach Eddie Thomson who handed Genc his first cap in the Trans-Tasman Series against New Zealand. Genc went on to earn 3 caps for Australia his last in 1997 under Terry Venables. He played in a friendly match for Australia against the great AC Milan team of the early '90s.

Aytek Genc was offered playing opportunities with Turkish club Trabzonspor and with Korean side Posco Atoms, however both opportunities fell through due inopportune injury and negotiation problems. In 1994 Genc moved to Malaysian side Johor FC and played five seasons in Malaysia where he became a legend with the Johor fans. During those years Genc came back to Australia in the Malaysian off season to play for the Sydney United team coached by Branko Culina, and was a member of the 1997 side. This team was considered one of the greatest NSL sides ever. In 1999 Genc finally returned to Australia finish his playing career and captained NSL side Sydney United until his retirement in 2002.

== Playing/coaching honours and achievements ==
- Australian Under 16 Indoor Soccer Representative 1983
- NSW Representative 1991, 1993
- Australian National Team (3 Caps)
- Winner NSL Cup with Parramatta Eagles
- NSL Minor Premiership and Grand Final Runner-up with Sydney United
- Winner NSW Premier League Premiership with Blacktown City Demons (Coach-2006)
- Winner NSW Continental Tyres Cup (Coach-2006)
- Winner NSW Premier League Premiership and Grand Final with Blacktown City Demons (Coach-2007)
- Head Coach 1st XI Football Oakhill College 2010

== Coaching career ==
Triple Championship Winning Coach in the NSW Premier League in 2006, 2007 and 2010. Assistant Coach of Sydney FC in 2009. His return to Blacktown from Sydney FC & Sydney Olympic was successful; he led the team to the NSW Premier League title, while also coaching the Oakhill College first XI.

In 2010, Genc became coaching director for the St. George Football Association.

He is part of the coaching staff of the 1st Eleven Football Academy.

Coaching Staff (Director of Football), Football United, NSW

== Media ==
Currently on the commentary team on SBS Australia TV and Radio
