= Zeljko Babic =

Australian soccer player

Personal information
- Full name: Zeljko Babic
- Date of birth: 3 April 1976 (age 50)
- Position: Striker

Senior career*
Years	Team	Apps	(Gls)
1990–1991	Borac Banja Luka		
1993–1996	Sydney United	43	(8)
1996–1997	Marconi Stallions	25	(8)
1997	Mount Pritchard		
1997–2000	Marconi Stallions	73	(23)
2000–2001	Sint-Truiden	3	(0)
2001–2002	Wollongong City	18	(2)
2002–2003	Sydney United	9	(0)
2003	Nepean Association	15	(10)
2003–2004	Sydney United	15	(1)
2004–2005	Bankstown City Lions		
2005	Johor FC		
2006	Bankstown City Lions		
2007–2009	Edgeworth Eagles		
2010	Lambton Jaffas		

International career^{‡}
1999	Australia	2	(0)
- * Club domestic league appearances and goals as of 31 March 2009 ‡ National team caps and goals as of 31 March 2009

Zeljko Babic (born 3 April 1976), also known as Sean Babic, is a former association football player in the now defunct National Soccer League in Australia. He represented Australia in two senior games.
