= Paul Bilokapic =

Australian former soccer player

Personal information
- Date of birth: 8 August 1976 (age 50)
- Position: Midfielder

Youth career
- Yaralla
- –1994: Sydney United
- 1994: → Australian Institute of Sport (loan)

Senior career*
Years	Team	Apps	(Gls)
1994–1998	Sydney United	92	(8)
1998–2001	Northern Spirit	66	(5)
2001–2003	Sydney United	51	(2)
2003	Wollongong United	11	(2)
2003–2004	APIA Leichhardt	20	(1)
2004–2005	Rockdale City Suns		

International career
1993	Australia U17	4	(2)
1995	Australia U20	4	(0)
1998	Australia	2	(0)
Medal record
Representing Australia
Men's Association football
OFC U-20 Championship
Winner	1994 Fiji
- * Club domestic league appearances and goals

Paul Bilokapic (born 8 August 1976) is an Australian former footballer who played as a midfielder.

== Playing career ==
=== Club career ===
After playing youth football for Yaralla, he moved to Sydney Croatia (later Sydney United) where he played until the end of the 1997–98 National Soccer League season. After two seasons with Northern Spirit FC, he returned to Sydney United, where he played until the end of the 2002–03 National Soccer League season.

=== International career ===
Bilokapic made his full international debut for Australia in February 1998 in a friendly match against Chile. He made two appearances for Australia, both in 1998.

== Personal life ==
He is the uncle of Nicholas Bilokapic who plays as a goalkeeper for English club Peterborough United.

== Honours ==
Australia U-20

- OFC U-20 Championship: 1994
