= 2009 Waratah Cup =

Tiger Turf Cup

Tournament details
- Country: Australia (NSW)

Final positions
- Champions: Sutherland Sharks (1st title)
- Runners-up: Manly United

Tournament statistics
- Matches played: 75

The 2009 Waratah Cup (known as the Tiger Turf Cup for sponsorship reasons) was the 13th season of the Waratah Cup of association football since its initial re-introduction in 1991, and the 29th season as the premier domestic cup competition in New South Wales since inauguration in 1957.

The defending champions were National Premier Leagues NSW side Bankstown City Lions.

The champions were the Sutherland Sharks, defeating Manly United 2–1 in the final.

== Teams ==
All senior member teams from Premier League, Super League, State League 1 and State League 2 as well as all local association teams were invited to the competition. The competition itself would be seeded with Association and State League 2 teams entering in Round 1, State League 1 and Super League teams entering in Round 2 and Premier League teams entering in Round 3. The champions were awarded $16,000 prize-money and the runners-up $6,000. All semi-finalists received $3,000.

Round	Clubs remaining	Clubs involved	Winners from previous round	New entries this round	Leagues entering at this round	Scheduled playing date
Preliminary Round	84	16	0	40	NSW State League Division 2 FNSW local Association teams	25 March
Round 1	68	16	8	0	none	8 April
Round 2	52	40	16	24	National Premier Leagues NSW 2 NSW State League Division 1	29 April
Round 3	32	32	20	12	National Premier Leagues NSW	8 May
Round 4	16	16	16	0	none	9 June
Quarter Finals	8	8	8	0	none	24 June
Semi Finals	4	4	4	0	none	19 July
Grand Final	2	2	2	0	none	16 August

== Preliminary Round ==
Due to the popularity of this year's edition, 48 teams from local Associations and NSW State League Division 2 entered the initial phase of the competition. This led to the creation of the Preliminary Round where 16 clubs were randomly chosen to play. 9 clubs were from the State League Division 2 and the other 7 were from local associations. The remaining 24 clubs would receive a bye into the first round. With the round set to kick-off on 25 March, only tie numbers 1–4 were played with the remaining matches rescheduled to the following week.

Tie no	Home team (Tier)	Score	Away team (Tier)
1	Baulkham Hills FC (-)	0–1	Camden Tigers (4)
2	Fairfield Bulls (4)	3–3	Toongabbie Junior (-)
Fairfield Bulls advance 4–2 on penalties.
3	Fairfield Hotspur (-)	4–0	Gazy Lansvale (4)
4	North Epping FC (-)	1–3	Gymea United (-)
5	Prospect United (4)	6–2	Ariana SC (-)
6	Luddenham United (4)	0–3	Hakoah (4)
7	Gladesville Ryde Magic (4)	–	Colo Colo Wanderers (4)
8	Hawkesbury (4)	0–2	Lokomotiv Cove (-)

Source: footballnsw.com.au and socceraust.co.uk

== Round 1 ==
A total of 32 teams competed, 8 having won in the preliminary round and 24 receiving a bye into the first round. Originally scheduled for 8 April, due to the postponement of matches in the preliminary round, most of the Round 1 matches instead began on the 15 April, with two matches played on the 22 April and a further three matches were also postponed due to poor pitch conditions.

Tie no	Home team (Tier)	Score	Away team (Tier)
1	Kenthurst & District (-)	2–3	Camden Tigers (4)
2	Lokomotiv Cove (-)	3–0	Albion Park White Eagles (-)
3	Collaroy Cromer Sharks (-)	4–0	Colo Colo Wanderers (4)
4	Fairfield Hotspur (-)	3–1	Penang FC (4)
5	Kellyville (-)	5–0	Hurstville City Minotaurs (4)
6	Prospect United (4)	1–0	Sans Souci (-)
7	Riverstone Schofields (-)	1–4	Bathurst 75 (4)
8	Roosters FC (4)	5–1	Bankstown Sports (-)

Tie no	Home team (Tier)	Score	Away team (Tier)
9	Seaforth FC (-)	0–2	Gymea United (-)
10	Eastwood St Andrews (-)	7–1	Dee Why (-)
11	Hakoah (4)	4–5	STFA Strikers (-)
12	White City (4)	0–4	Kogarah Waratah (-)
13	Yagoona Lions (-)	1–2	Port Kembla (-)
14	Marton FC	0–4	Springwood (4)
15	Fairfield Bulls (4)	0–2	Pacific Hills/Dural (-)
16	Brookvale (-)	4–0	Baktar Glory (-)

Source: footballnsw.com.au and socceraust.co.uk

== Round 2 ==
A total of 40 teams competed, 16 of which had progressed from Round 1 along with 24 clubs from the National Premier Leagues NSW 2 and NSW State League Division 1.

Tie no	Home team (Tier)	Score	Away team (Tier)
1	Collaroy Cromer Sharks (-)	1–2	Inter Lions (3)
2	Fairfield Hotspur (-)	0–3	Camden Tigers (4)
3	Roosters FC (-)	1–0	Lokomotiv Cove (-)
4	Springwood (4)	2–1	Bathurst 75 (4)
5	PCYC Parramatta (2)	1–0	Stanmore Hawks (3)
6	Mt Druitt Town Rangers (2)	0–2	Dulwich Hill (3)
7	Fairfield City Lions (3)	0–3	Granville Rage (2)
8	St George FC (2)	4–0	Hurstville Zagreb (3)
9	Eastwood St Andrews (-)	0–5	Rockdale City Suns (2)
10	Balmain SC (3)	0–2	Northern Tigers (2)

Tie no	Home team (Tier)	Score	Away team (Tier)
11	Macarthur Rams (2)	1–1	STFA Strikers (-)
Macarthur Rams advanced 5–4 on penalties.
12	Sydney Wanderers (3)	3–0	FC Bossy Liverpool (2)
13	Mounties FC (3)	0–2	Gymea United (-)
14	Hills Brumbies (3)	0–4	Sydney University (2)
15	Schofield Scorpions (3)	3–4	Pacific Hills/Dural (-)
16	Blacktown Spartans (3)	0–3	Port Kembla (-)
17	Central Coast Lightning (2)	3–2	Brookvale SC (-)
18	Spirit FC (2)	4–0	University of NSW (3)
19	Fraser Park (2)	3–2	Kogarah Waratah (-)
20	Prospect United (4)	3–1	Kellyville (-)

Source:footballnsw.com.au and socceraust.co.uk

== Round 3 ==
A total of 32 teams competed, 20 of which had progressed from Round 3 along with 12 clubs from National Premier Leagues NSW.

Tie no	Home team (Tier)	Score	Away team (Tier)
1	Blacktown City Demons (1)	2–1	Dulwich Hill (3)
2	Camden Tigers (4)	1–0	Northern Tigers (2)
3	Rockdale City Suns (2)	2–1	Springwood (4)
4	Marconi Stallions (1)	9–0	Inter Lions (3)
5	PCYC Parramatta (2)	9–3	Prospect United (4)
6	Sutherland Sharks (1)	2–1	Sydney University (2)
7	West Sydney Berries (1)	1–2	Granville Rage (2)
8	Fraser Park (2)	4–3 (a.e.t.)	STFA Strikers (-)

Tie no	Home team (Tier)	Score	Away team (Tier)
9	Bonnyrigg White Eagles (1)	4–2	Gymea United (-)
10	Penrith Nepean United (1)	5–3 (a.e.t.)	Roosters FC (4)
11	Sydney United (1)	1–0	St George FC (2)
12	Bankstown City Lions (1)	3–1	Port Kembla (-)
13	Manly United (1)	3–0	Pacific Hills/Dural
14	Sydney Wanderers (3)	0–5	Wollongong CFC (1)
15	Spirit FC (2)	1–0	Sydney Olympic (1)
16	APIA Leichhardt (1)	3–2	Central Coast Lightning (-)

Source:footballnsw.com.au and socceraust.co.uk

== Round 4 ==
Camden Tigers were the lowest ranked team to qualify for this round from NSW fourth tier. There were no association teams left in the competition. Of the fifteen other remaining clubs, ten were from the Premier League and five from the Super League.

Tie no	Home team (Tier)	Score	Away team (Tier)
1	Bankstown City Lions (1)	2–1	Sydney United (1)
2	PCYC Parramatta (2)	0–2	Bonnyrigg White Eagles (1)
3	Sutherland Sharks (1)	4–1	Marconi Stallions (1)
4	Fraser Park (2)	1–0	Camden Tigers (4)

Tie no	Home team (Tier)	Score	Away team (Tier)
5	Spirit FC (2)	0–1	Manly United (1)
6	APIA Leichhardt (1)	0–2	Wollongong CFC (1)
7	Granville Rage (2)	3–7	Blacktown City Demons (1)
8	Rockdale City Suns (2)	0–1	Penrith Nepean United (1)

Source:footballnsw.com.au and socceraust.co.uk

== Quarter-finals ==
As the only team outside of the Premier League, Fraser Park was the lowest team ranked to qualify for the quarter-finals.

14 June 2009
19:00 AEST (UTC+10:00)

Sutherland Sharks	2–1	Bankstown City Lions
Panny Nikas 45', 88'	Report	Tallan Martin 90'

Seymour Shaw Park, Miranda
Attendance: 130
Referee: Khodr Yaghi
1 July 2009
19:30 AEST (UTC+10:00)

Bonnyrigg White Eagles	0–3	Manly United
	Report	Robbie Cattanach 3', 18'; Jimmy Oates 27'

Bonnyrigg Sports Club, Bonnyrigg
Attendance: 250 c.
Referee: Khodr Yaghi
7 July 2013
18:30 AEST (UTC+10:00)

Blacktown City Demons	5–0	Fraser Park
Paul Karbon 12'; Ante Deur 26'; Joel Chianese 40'; Gavin Forbes 72'; Matt Lewis 80'	Report

Gabbie Stadium, Seven Hills
Attendance: 100 c.
7 July 2013
20:15 AEST (UTC+10:00)

Penrith Nepean United	2–1 (a.e.t.)	Wollongong Community FC
Devrim Hüseyin 33'; Michael Dowling 104'	Report	Kieran Deane 7'

Gabbie Stadium, Seven Hills
Attendance: 200
Referee: Sandro Perticarini

== Semi-finals ==
All remaining clubs were from NSW's top tier, the NSW Premier League.

19 July 2009
12:00 AEST (UTC+10:00)

Blacktown City Demons	0–2 (a.e.t.)	Manly United
	Report	Michael Lloyd-Green 97', 105'

Seymour Shaw Park, Miranda
Attendance: 400 c.
Referee: Gerard Parsons
19 July 2009
14:30 AEST (UTC+10:00)

Sutherland Sharks	4–0	Penrith Nepean United
Panny Nikas 13'; Neil Jablonski 18'; Jim Bakis 68'; Nathan Ralph 90+1'	Report

Seymour Shaw Park, Sydney
Attendance: 450 c.
Referee: Kurt Ams

== Grand final ==
15 August 2009
15:00 AEST (UTC+10:00)

Sutherland Sharks	2–1 (a.e.t.)	Manly United
Brad Boardman 24'; Nick Stavroulakis 115'	Report	Keith Shelving 25'

Seymour Shaw Park, Miranda
Referee: Gerard Parsons

1	(Australia) Nathan Denham
2	(Australia) George Souris
4	(Australia) Michael Robinson	(yellow card) 61'
6	(Australia) Chris Price
7	(Australia) Jim Bakis	(substituted off) 91'
8	(Australia) Nathan Ralph	(substituted off) 91'
9	(Australia) Brad Boardman
11	(Australia) Ben Spruce
12	(Australia) Neil Jablonksi
14	(Australia) Nick Stavroulakis
15	(Australia) Michael Katz
Substitutes:
5	(Australia) Andrew Smith
10	(Australia) Matthew Hall		(substituted on) 91'
17	(Australia) Jordan Nikolovski
18	(Australia) Blake Powell	(yellow card) 98'	(substituted on) 91'
22	(Australia) Yanni Fragogiannis
Coach:
(Australia) Robbie Stanton

1	(Australia) Brad Swancott
2	(Australia) Shaun Bowden		(substituted off) 98'
5	(Australia) Joel Grenell
6	(Australia) Scott Thomas		(substituted off) 56'
7	(Australia) Ashley Ryan
8	(Australia) Michael Lloyd-Green
13	(Australia) Mitch Macedo		(substituted off) 82'
15	(Australia) Keith Shevlin
16	(Australia) Joey Schrippa
24	(Australia) Brad Groves
33	(Australia) Sam Gallagher	(yellow card) 13'
Substitutes:
10	(Australia) Giosue Sama		(substituted on) 82'
11	(Australia) Craig Midgley		(substituted on) 56'
12	(Australia) Jamie Garside		(substituted on) 98'
26	(Australia) Jimmy Oates
41	(Australia) Ben McNamara
Coach:
(Australia) Phil Moss

Player of the Match:
Nick Stavroulakis (Sutherland Sharks FC)
Assistant referees:
Lance Greenshields and Christian Mehl
Fourth official:
Kris Griffiths-Jones

Match rules

- 90 minutes
- 30 minutes of extra time if necessary.
- Penalty shoot-out if scores still level.

NSW Waratah State Cup
2009 Champions

Sutherland Sharks FC
First Title

=== Statistics ===
	Sutherland Sharks	Manly United
Attempts at goal	13	12
Attempts on target	6	7
Corners	5	3
Fouls committed	24	26
Offsides	5	4
Yellow cards	2	1
Red cards	0	0
