= 2018 Football NSW season =

Football New South Wales
- Season: 2018

The Football NSW 2018 season was the sixth season of football in New South Wales under the banner of the National Premier Leagues. The competition consisted of four divisions across the state of New South Wales. The Premiers of the NPL NSW Men's 1 qualified for the national finals, playing-off to decide the champion of the 2018 National Premier Leagues.

== Competitions ==
=== 2018 National Premier League NSW Men's 1 ===
NPL NSW Men's 1
- Season: 2018
- Champions: Sydney Olympic
- Premiers: Sydney Olympic
- Matches: 138
- Goals: 440 (3.19 per match)
- Top goalscorer: Jordan Murray 23 (APIA Leichhardt Tigers)
- Biggest home win: APIA Leichhardt Tigers 8–2 Rockdale City Suns (25 August 2018)
- Biggest away win: Rockdale City Suns 0–5 APIA Leichhardt Tigers (7 April 2018)
- Highest scoring: APIA Leichhardt Tigers 8–2 Rockdale City Suns (25 August 2018)

==== League table ====
Pos	Team	Pld	W	D	L	GF	GA	GD	Pts	Qualification or relegation
1	Sydney Olympic (C)	22	15	3	4	40	19	+21	48	2018 National Premier Leagues Finals
2	APIA Leichhardt Tigers	22	14	3	5	62	28	+34	45	2018 NSW Finals
3	Sydney United 58	22	12	2	8	36	29	+7	38	2018 NSW Finals
4	Blacktown City	22	9	7	6	27	20	+7	34	2018 NSW Finals
5	Rockdale City Suns	22	9	4	9	39	43	−4	31	2018 NSW Finals
6	Marconi Stallions	22	8	6	8	30	34	−4	30	
7	Hakoah Sydney City East	22	8	4	10	33	32	+1	28	
8	Manly United	22	7	7	8	33	32	+1	28	
9	Wollongong Wolves	22	7	6	9	23	36	−13	27	
10	Sutherland Sharks	22	7	2	13	30	39	−9	23	
11	Bonnyrigg White Eagles (R)	22	6	4	12	30	51	−21	22	Relegation to the 2019 NPL NSW 2 (Note: Relegation based on Club Championship and including points from U20 and U18 teams.)
12	Sydney FC Youth	22	4	4	14	27	47	−20	16	

Source: sportstg.com
Rules for classification: 1) points; 2) goal difference; 3) number of goals scored.
(C) Champions; (R) Relegated

==== Finals ====
Qualifying final
2	APIA Leichhardt Tigers	0 (3)
3	Sydney United 58	0 (5)
4	Blacktown City	0
5	Rockdale City Suns	2

Major semi-final
1	Sydney Olympic	4
3	Sydney United 58	0
Minor semi-final
2	APIA Leichhardt Tigers	8
5	Rockdale City Suns	2

Preliminary final
3	Sydney United 58	1 (3)
2	APIA Leichhardt Tigers	1 (5)

Grand final
1	Sydney Olympic	3
2	APIA Leichhardt Tigers	1

=== 2018 National Premier League NSW Men's 2 ===
NPL NSW Men's 2
- Season: 2018
- Champions: St George
- Promoted: Mt Druitt Town Rangers
- Matches: 147
- Goals: 533 (3.63 per match)

The 2018 National Premier League NSW Men's 2 was the sixth edition of the NPL NSW 2 as the second level domestic association football competition in New South Wales. 14 teams competed, playing each other twice for a total of 26 rounds, with the top team at the end of the year (based on the Club Championship) promoted to the NPL NSW Men's 1 competition.

==== League table ====
Pos	Team	Pld	W	D	L	GF	GA	GD	Pts	Qualification or relegation
1	Mt Druitt Town Rangers (P)	26	20	2	4	66	26	+40	62	Promotion to the 2019 NPL NSW 1 (Note: Promotion based on Club Championship and including points from U20 and U18.)
2	St George (C)	26	14	4	8	71	40	+31	46	Qualification for the 2018 NPL NSW Men's 2 Finals
3	North Shore Mariners	26	13	6	7	55	46	+9	45	Qualification for the 2018 NPL NSW Men's 2 Finals
4	Central Coast Mariners Academy	26	12	8	6	51	33	+18	44	Qualification for the 2018 NPL NSW Men's 2 Finals
5	Northern Tigers	26	10	9	7	44	39	+5	39	Qualification for the 2018 NPL NSW Men's 2 Finals
6	Mounties Wanderers	26	11	5	10	53	50	+3	38	Qualification for the 2018 NPL NSW Men's 2 Finals
7	Spirit FC	26	11	5	10	45	45	0	38	
8	Hills United	26	9	9	8	46	43	+3	36	
9	Rydalmere Lions	26	10	5	11	40	46	−6	35	
10	Canterbury Bankstown	26	8	5	13	36	48	−12	29	
11	Western Sydney Wanderers Youth	26	7	5	14	48	55	−7	26	
12	Macarthur Rams	26	6	6	14	31	52	−21	24	
13	Parramatta FC (R)	26	4	10	12	31	60	−29	22	Relegation to the 2019 NPL NSW 3 (Note: Relegation based on Club Championship and including points from U20 and U18.)
14	Blacktown Spartans	26	4	7	15	28	62	−34	19	

Source: nswpl.com.au
Rules for classification: 1) points; 2) goal difference; 3) number of goals scored.
(C) Champions; (P) Promoted; (R) Relegated

==== Finals ====
Elimination finals
4	Central Coast Mariners Academy	1
5	Northern Tigers	2
3	North Shore Mariners	0
6	Mounties Wanderers	1

Semi-finals
2	St George	2 (5)
5	Northern Tigers	2 (3)
1	Mt Druitt Town Rangers	1
6	Mounties Wanderers	2

Grand final
2	St George	3 (4)
6	Mounties Wanderers	3 (3)

=== 2018 National Premier League NSW Men's 3 ===
NPL NSW Men's 3
- Season: 2018
- Champions: St George FA
- Promoted: St George FA
- Matches: 188
- Goals: 771 (4.1 per match)
- Top goalscorer: Michael Gaitatzis - 35 (Gladesville Ryde Magic)

==== League table ====
Pos	Team	Pld	W	D	L	GF	GA	GD	Pts	Qualification or relegation
1	St George FA (C, P)	26	18	5	3	79	23	+56	59	Promotion to the 2019 NPL NSW 2 (Note: Promotion based on Club Championship and including points from U20 and U18.)
2	Hawkesbury City	26	16	6	4	50	32	+18	54	Qualification for the 2018 NPL NSW Men's 3 Finals
3	Gladesville Ryde Magic	26	16	4	6	74	43	+31	52	Qualification for the 2018 NPL NSW Men's 3 Finals
4	SD Raiders	26	13	8	5	77	42	+35	47	Qualification for the 2018 NPL NSW Men's 3 Finals
5	Bankstown City	26	14	4	8	63	41	+22	46	Qualification for the 2018 NPL NSW Men's 3 Finals
6	Dunbar Rovers	26	13	5	8	61	46	+15	44	Qualification for the 2018 NPL NSW Men's 3 Finals
7	Sydney University	26	12	6	8	60	39	+21	42	
8	Camden Tigers	26	11	3	12	66	54	+12	36	
9	Dulwich Hill	26	9	4	13	45	52	−7	31	
10	Granville Rage	26	9	3	14	38	69	−31	30	
11	Inter Lions	26	7	4	15	47	61	−14	25	
12	Stanmore Hawks	26	7	4	15	39	64	−25	25	
13	Western NSW Mariners	26	3	5	18	30	93	−63	14	
14	Fraser Park (R)	26	1	5	20	26	96	−70	8	Relegation to the 2019 NSW State League^{1} (Note: Relegation based on Club Championship and including points from U20 and U18.)

Source: nswpl.com.au
Rules for classification: 1) points; 2) goal difference; 3) number of goals scored.
(C) Champions; (P) Promoted; (R) Relegated

==== Finals ====
Elimination finals
4	SD Raiders	1 (6)
5	Bankstown City	1 (5)
3	Gladesville Ryde Magic	1
6	Dunbar Rovers	4

Semi-finals
1	St George FA	4
6	Dunbar Rovers	0
2	Hawkesbury City	1
4	SD Raiders	2

Grand final
1	St George FA	2
4	SD Raiders	0

=== 2018 NSW State League ===
NSW State League
- Season: 2018
- Champions: Central Coast United
- Promoted: Bankstown United
- Matches: 131
- Goals: 500 (3.82 per match)

==== League table ====
Pos	Team	Pld	W	D	L	GF	GA	GD	Pts	Qualification or relegation
1	Bankstown United	22	19	1	2	63	23	+40	58	Promotion to the 2019 NPL NSW 3 (Note: Promotion based on Club Championship and including points from U20 and U18.)
2	Central Coast United	22	18	3	1	85	17	+68	57	Qualification for the 2018 NSW State League Finals
3	University of NSW	22	14	1	7	55	31	+24	43	Qualification for the 2018 NSW State League Finals
4	Prospect United	22	11	3	8	40	38	+2	36	Qualification for the 2018 NSW State League Finals
5	Nepean FC	21	11	2	8	49	32	+17	35	Qualification for the 2018 NSW State League Finals
6	Hurstville FC	22	10	3	9	35	35	0	33	
7	Western Condors	22	7	5	10	27	34	−7	26	
8	Hurstville City Minotaurs	22	7	4	11	42	48	−6	25	
9	South Coast Flame FC	22	7	1	14	41	48	−7	22	
10	FC Gazy Auburn	21	6	1	14	25	62	−37	19	
11	Balmain Tigers	22	5	2	15	23	55	−32	17	
12	Wagga City Wanderers	22	2	2	18	15	77	−62	8	Transferred to ACT NPL2 for 2019 season

Source: sportstg.com
Rules for classification: 1) points; 2) goal difference; 3) number of goals scored.

==== Finals ====
Qualifying final
2	Central Coast United	4
3	University of NSW	1
4	Prospect United	0
5	Nepean FC	3

Major semi-final
1	Bankstown United	3 (4)
2	Central Coast United	3 (2)
Minor semi-final
3	University of NSW	1
5	Nepean FC	4

Preliminary final
2	Central Coast United	3
5	Nepean FC	1

Grand final
1	Bankstown United	0
2	Central Coast United	2

=== 2018 National Premier Leagues NSW Women's 1 ===
National Premier Leagues NSW Women's 1
- Season: 2018
- Champions: Macarthur Rams
- Premiers: Sydney University
- Top goalscorer: Georgia Yeoman-Dale 32 (Macarthur Rams)

The 2018 National Premier Leagues NSW Women's 1 was the fifth edition of the NPL NSW Women's competition to be incorporated under the National Premier Leagues banner. The league increased from 10 to 12 teams, playing each other twice for a total of 22 rounds.

==== League table ====
Pos	Team	Pld	W	D	L	GF	GA	GD	Pts	Qualification or relegation
1	Sydney University	22	15	5	2	67	19	+48	50	Qualification for the 2018 NPL NSW Women's Finals
2	Illawarra Stingrays	22	16	0	6	84	38	+46	48	Qualification for the 2018 NPL NSW Women's Finals
3	Macarthur Rams (C)	22	13	7	2	76	27	+49	46	Qualification for the 2018 NPL NSW Women's Finals
4	Manly United	22	14	3	5	57	31	+26	45	Qualification for the 2018 NPL NSW Women's Finals
5	Football NSW Institute	22	13	4	5	77	39	+38	43	Qualification for the 2018 NPL NSW Women's Finals
6	North West Sydney Koalas	22	13	2	7	50	35	+15	41	
7	North Shore Mariners	22	7	6	9	37	42	−5	27	
8	Blacktown Spartans	22	8	3	11	46	55	−9	27	
9	Northern Tigers	22	5	6	11	28	38	−10	21	
10	Bankstown City	22	2	4	16	16	71	−55	10	
11	Emerging Jets	22	2	4	16	20	82	−62	10	
12	Sutherland Shire (R)	22	1	2	19	12	93	−81	5	Relegation to 2019 NPL NSW Women's 2

Source: sportstg.com
Rules for classification: 1) points; 2) goal difference; 3) number of goals scored.
(C) Champions; (R) Relegated

== 2018 Waratah Cup ==
Football NSW soccer clubs competed in 2018 for the Waratah Cup. The tournament doubled as the NSW qualifier for the 2018 FFA Cup, with the top five clubs progressing to the Round of 32. A record 169 clubs entered the qualifying phase, with the clubs entering in a staggered format.

The Cup was won by APIA Leichhardt Tigers.

In addition to the three A-League clubs (Central Coast Mariners, Sydney FC and Western Sydney Wanderers), the five qualifiers (APIA Leichhardt Tigers, Bonnyrigg White Eagles, Hakoah Sydney City East, Marconi Stallions and Rockdale City Suns) competed in the final rounds of the 2018 FFA Cup.

== Honours and awards ==
The End of Year awards were held at Dolton House and presented on 14 September 2018 for National Premier Leagues NSW Men's and Women's and on 21 September 2018 for National Premier Leagues NSW Men's and Women's 2, as well as Men's 3 and State League competitions.

=== National Premier Leagues NSW ===
Club honours and awards

Award		Men's	Women's
First Grade	Premiers	Sydney Olympic	Sydney University SFC
First Grade	Champions	Sydney Olympic	Macarthur Rams
U-20's / Reserves	Premiers	Blacktown City	Sydney University SFC
U-20's / Reserves	Champions	Sutherland Sharks	Blacktown Spartans
Club Championship		Blacktown City	Sydney University SFC
Fair Play award		Manly United	North West Sydney Women's Koalas

Individual awards

Award	Men's	Women's
Referee of the Year	Kurt Ams	Kelly Jones
Goalkeeper of the Year	Paul Henderson (Sydney Olympic)	Jada Whyman (FNSW Institute)
Golden Boot (U-20's/Reserves)	Hamish Lamberton (Sydney FC Youth – 18 goals)	Vesna Milivojevic (FNSW Institute – 24 goals)
Player of the Year (U-20's/Reserves)	Lachlan Campbell (Blacktown City FC)	Maddison Zahra (Manly United)
Golden Boot	Jordan Murray (APIA Leichhardt – 23 goals)	Georgia Yeoman-Dale (Macarthur Rams – 30 goals)
Coach of the Year	Abbas Saad (Sydney Olympic)	Chris Williams (Manly United)
Goal of the Year	Thomas Whiteside (Manly United)	—
Player of the Year	Tasuku Sekiya (APIA Leichhardt)	Courtney Nevin (FNSW Institute) Kylie Ledbrook (Macarthur Rams)

=== National Premier Leagues NSW 2 ===
Club honours and awards

Award	Men's	Women's
First Grade Premiers	Mount Druitt Town Rangers	Sydney Olympic
First Grade Champions	St George FC	Sydney Olympic
Club Championship	Mount Druitt Town Rangers	Sydney Olympic
Fair Play Award	Western Sydney Wanderers FC Youth	Western NSW Mariners

Individual awards

Award	Men's	Women's
Referee of the Year	Ben Abraham	Yosemite Guilmeer
Goalkeeper of the Year	Carlos Saliadarre (Mount Druitt Town Rangers)	Amanda Horafios (Sydney Olympic)
Golden Boot (U-20's/Reserves)	Anthony Haddad (Macarthur Rams – 30 goals)	Erin Connell (Nepean FC – 20 goals)
Player of the Year (U-20's/Reserves)	Zach Forsyth (Central Coast Mariners Academy)	Emily Smith (APIA Leichhardt)
Golden Boot	Emmanuel Gonzalez (Mount Druitt Town Rangers – 25 goals)	Candice Phelan (Central Coast Mariners – 44 goals)
Coach of the Year	Aiden Desmond (Mount Druitt Town Rangers)	Dan Barrett (Central Coast Mariners)
Goal of the Year	Thomas Whiteside (Manly United)	—
Player of the Year	Raul Beneit Romero (Mounties Wanderers)	Lieke de Bever (Sydney Olympic)

=== Other Leagues ===
Award	Men's NPL 3	Men's State League
First Grade Premiers	St George FA	Bankstown United
First Grade Champions	St George FA	Central Coast United
Club Championship	St George FA	Bankstown United
Fair Play Award	Camden Tigers & Stanmore Hawks	Central Coast United

Individual awards

Award	Men's NPL 3	Men's State League
Goalkeeper of the Year	Kiriakos Tohorouglou (Gladesville Ryde Magic) Christopher Marques (St George FA)	David Hamilton (Bankstown United)
Golden Boot (U-20's/Reserves)	Riley Thomas-King (St George FA – 18 goals)	Johnny Vicoroski (South Coast Flame – 19 goals)
Player of the Year (U-20's/Reserves)	Emanuel Koumis (St George FA)	Futo Ihara (Bankstown United)
Golden Boot	Michael Gaitatzis (Gladesville Ryde Magic – 35 goals)	Mitchell Cross (Bankstown United – 25 goals)
Coach of the Year	Dean Bertenshaw (Hawkesbury City FC)	Scott Belgre (Bankstown United)
Player of the Year	Michael Gaitatzis (Gladesville Ryde Magic)	Toshihisa Saikawa (Bankstown United) Daniel McFarlane (Central Coast United)
