= 1961 NSW Federation Cup =

Craven 'A' Cup

Tournament details
- Country: Australia (NSW)
- Teams: 16

Final positions
- Champions: Sydney Hakoah
- Runners-up: Canterbury-Marrickville

Tournament statistics
- Matches played: 19
- Goals scored: 79 (4.16 per match)

The 1961 NSW Federation Cup was the fifth edition of the NSW Soccer Federation's premier soccer cup. This was the third tournament sponsored by W.D. & H.O. Wills and called the "Craven 'A' Cup" after their popular cigarette. The cup was contested by all twelve first division clubs and four second division clubs. The £1000 prize money was divided among the first four placings, with first place receiving £600, second place £250, third place £100 and fourth place £50.

Bankstown were the defending champions, having beaten Canterbury-Marrickville 2–0 in last year's final. They were eliminated by Auburn in the quarter-finals.

The final was played on 15 October 1961 between Sydney Hakoah and Canterbury-Marrickville. Hakoah won the match 2–0 to claim their second title.

== Format and clubs ==
Round	Clubs remaining	Clubs advancing from previous round	New entries this round	Main match dates
First Round	16	N/A	12 clubs from NSW First Division; 4 clubs from NSW Second Division	10 June 1961
Quarter-finals	8	8 winners from First Round	none	4–8 Oct 1961
Semi-finals	4	4 winners from quarter-finals	none	11 Oct 1961
Third place playoff and Final	4	2 losers from semi-finals enter Third place playoff; 2 winners from semi-finals enter Final	none	15 Oct 1961

== First Round ==
Tie	Team 1 (div.)	Score	Team 2 (div.)	Kick-off	Date	Venue
1	Budapest (1)	2–2 (a.e.t.)	Gladesville-Ryde (1)	13:00 AEST	10 June 1961	Wentworth Park, Glebe
2	Sydney Hakoah (1)	4–3	Pan Hellenic (1)	15:00 AEST	10 June 1961	Wentworth Park, Glebe
3	Polonia-North Side (1)	6–2	Blacktown BSK (2)	13:00 AEST	10 June 1961	Drummoyne Oval, Drummoyne
4	A.P.I.A. (1)	4–2	Yugal (2)	15:00 AEST	10 June 1961	Drummoyne Oval, Drummoyne
5	Bankstown (1)	1–0	Sydney Austral (1)	13:00 AEST	10 June 1961	Arlington Oval, Marrickville
6	Auburn (1)	4–2	Croatia (2)	15:00 AEST	10 June 1961	Arlington Oval, Marrickville
7	Balgownie (2)	2–2	Prague (1)	13:00 AEST	10 June 1961	Wollongong Showground, Wollongong
8	South Coast United (1)	1–2	Canterbury-Marrickville (1)	15:00 AEST	10 June 1961	Wollongong Showground, Wollongong
replay	Gladesville-Ryde (1)	0–1	Budapest (1)	19:15 AEST	5 September 1961	E.S. Marks Field, Kensington
replay	Prague (1)	1–1 (a.e.t.)	Balgownie (2)	21:00 AEST	5 September 1961	E.S. Marks Field, Kensington
replay	Balgownie (2)	0–3	Prague (1)	19:45 AEST	20 September 1961	Wollongong Showground, Wollongong

== Finals ==
=== Quarter-finals ===
4 October 1961
19:15 AEST (UTC+10:00)

Budapest	4–3 (a.e.t.)	Polonia-North Side
R. Flett 19'; Hetherington 30'; Medina 80'; Vasvary 102'	Report	G. Czubala 26'; E. McLeod 68'; J. Bryce 70'

Sydney Athletics Field, Kensington
Attendance: 3,600
Referee: Frank Sbisa
4 October 1961
21:00 AEST (UTC+10:00)

Canterbury-Marrickville	4–3 (a.e.t.)	Prague
B. Smith 10', 55'; Watkiss 72', 118'	Report	Jones 18'; Ninaus 30'; A. Jeffrey 70'

Sydney Athletics Field, Kensington
Attendance: 3,600
Referee: J. Carter
8 October 1961
13:15 AEST (UTC+10:00)

Auburn	1–0	Bankstown
Quested 9'	Report

Sydney Athletics Field, Kensington
Attendance: 8,200
Referee: L. Wilson
8 October 1961
15:00 AEST (UTC+10:00)

Sydney Hakoah	2–1	APIA Leichhardt
Neal 20', 35'	Report	Kearns 34' (o.g.)

Sydney Athletics Field, Kensington
Attendance: 8,200
Referee: H. Parsons

=== Semi-finals ===
11 October 1961
19:15 AEST (UTC+10:00)

Budapest	2–4	Canterbury-Marrickville
D. Brown 49' (o.g.); G. Kovacs 63'	Report	Salisbury 39'; Watkiss 51'; J. Moore 66'; D. Brown 69' (pen.)

Redfern Oval, Redfern
Attendance: 4,000
Referee: Roy Pearce
11 October 1961
21:00 AEST (UTC+10:00)

Hakoah	3–0	Auburn
R. Levi 21'; F. Van Gaalen 38' (o.g.); Neal 83'	Report

Redfern Oval, Redfern
Attendance: 4,000
Referee: J. Carter

=== Third place playoff ===
15 October 1961
13:15 AEST (UTC+10:00)

Budapest	3–4	Auburn

Redfern Oval, Redfern
Attendance: 8,800
Referee: Roy Pearce

=== Final ===
15 October 1961
15:00 AEST (UTC+10:00)

Hakoah	2–0	Canterbury-Marrickville

Redfern Oval, Redfern
Attendance: 8,800
Referee: Frank Sbisa

NSW Federation Cup
1961 Champions

Sydney Hakoah
Second Title
