= Taisei Kaneko =

Japanese footballer

Taisei Kaneko 金子大晟
Personal information
- Full name: Taisei Kaneko
- Date of birth: August 14, 1998 (age 28)
- Place of birth: Kanagawa, Japan
- Height: 1.70 m (5 ft 7 in)
- Position: Forward

Youth career
- YSCC Yokohama

Senior career*
Years	Team	Apps	(Gls)
2017–2021	YSCC Yokohama	12	(0)
2019	→ Taichung Futuro (loan)	5	(2)
2022–2023	Sydney United 58	32	(3)
2024–2025	Gold Coast Knights	41	(9)
- * Club domestic league appearances and goals as of 9 April 2026

Taisei Kaneko (金子大晟, Kaneko Taisei; born August 14, 1998) is a Japanese footballer who last played for Gold Coast Knights in the NPL Queensland.

== Career ==
=== YSCC Yokohama ===
After being raised from the YSCC Yokohama youth ranks, Kaneko was promoted to the top team in March 2017. He had the chance of debuting in the J3 League only one year after he was signed: Kaneko came in against Giravanz Kitakyushu in a game of July 2018.

=== Taichung Futuro ===
In August 2019, Kaneko joined the Taiwanese team Taichung Futuro F.C. on a short-term loan.

=== Sydney United ===
On 27 February 2022, Kaneko signed for NPL NSW club Sydney United 58. He made his debut on 26 June in a 3–3 league draw against Rockdale Ilinden, and scored his first goal for the club against APIA Leichhardt in the last game of the 2022 season. That same season, Kaneko helped Sydney United achieve runners-up in both cup campaigns in the Waratah Cup and Australia Cup, losing both to NWS Spirit and Macarthur FC subsequently.

Kaneko would play in the 2023 Waratah Cup, scoring in the final of a 3–1 victory over APIA Leichhardt at Leichhardt Oval and achieving his first trophy with Sydney United.

=== Gold Coast Knights ===
On February 21, 2024, Gold Coast Knights announced the signing of Taisei for the 2024 NPL Queensland season.

== Honours ==
Sydney United 58

- Waratah Cup Champions: 2023
- Australian-Croatian Soccer Tournament Division One Champions: 2023

== Club statistics ==
Updated to 23 August 2018.

Club performance			League		Cup		Total	
Season	Club	League	Apps	Goals	Apps	Goals	Apps	Goals
Japan			League		Emperor's Cup		Total	
2017	YSCC Yokohama	J3 League	0	0	0	0	0	0
2018	YSCC Yokohama	J3 League	2	0	0	0	2	0
Career total			2	0	0	0	2	0
