= 2012 Waratah Cup =

McDonald's Cup

Tournament details
- Country: Australia (NSW)
- Teams: 85

Final positions
- Champions: Sutherland Sharks
- Runners-up: APIA Leichhardt Tigers

The 2012 Waratah Cup was the 10th season of the association football knockout competition under the Waratah Cup name. The preliminary round for the competition commenced on 23 March 2012.

The champions were Sutherland Sharks – their second title (including the Statewide Cup competition) – who beat APIA Leichhardt Tigers in the Cup Final.

== Preliminary round ==
The draw was announced on 23 March 2012.

Home team	Score	Away team
Dunbar Rovers	2–1	Belmore United
Miranda Magpies	2–1	Hurstville City Minotaurs
Polonia Rams	0–6	Coogee United
Glenmore Park	1–0	Arncliffe Aurora
Belmore Eagles FC	4–6	Gymea United FC
FC Gazy Lansvale	–	Hills Pumas
Lilli Pilli FC	5–1	Luddenham United
Central Coast Mariners Academy	7–3	Loftus
Western Condors	2–3	West City FC

Home team	Score	Away team
Auburn FC	4–1	Bangor FC
Picton Rangers	4–0	Forrest Rangers
Helensburgh Thistle	0–3	Canberra Olympic
Bass Hill RSL	5–2	Bathurst 75
All Saints Oatley	2–3	Rydalemere FC
Ponds FC	2–7	Waverley Old Boys
White City	1–2	Bondi FC
Hakoah FC	2–1	Barden Ridgebacks

- Teams receiving a Bye into the First Round : Canberra FC, Inter Lions, Dee Why, Dapto Dandaloo, Mountains United, Liverpool Sports Club, Hawkesbury City, Sans Souci, Bulli, Nepean FC, Tarrawanna, Doonside Hawks, Enfield Rovers, Prospect United, Chullora Wolves.

== First round ==
Home team	Score	Away team
Lilli Pilli	4–2	Mountains United
Doonside	1–3	Nepean FC
Sans Souci	6–0	Gymea United FC
Bass Hill RSL	2–6	Waverley Old Boys
Auburn FC	0–0 (3–5 pens)	Rydalmere FC
Glenmore Park	1–3	Bondi FC
Tarrawanna	4–0	Dunbar Rovers
Prospect United	1–1 (4–3 pens)	Coogee United

Home team	Score	Away team
Central Coast Mariners Academy	3–2	Inter Lions
Hawkesbury City	2–3	Canberra Olympic
Enfield Rovers	1–3	Canberra FC
Miranda Magpies	1–1 (3–4 pens)	Picton Rangers
Chullora Wolves	0–9	West City FC
Bulli	1–2	Hills Pumas
Hakoah FC	2–3	Dapto Dandaloo
Liverpool Sports Club		Dee Why

== Second round ==
Home team	Score	Away team
Prospect United	1–0	Waverley Old Boys
Granville Rage	3–4	Balmain SC
Hills Pumas	4–4 (3–1 pens)	Northbridge FC
Dapto Dandaloo	5–1	Lilli Pilli
Bankstown City Lions	4–2	Hurstville ZFC
Central Coast Mariners Academy	0–1	Southern Bulls
Sydney University	3–4	University of NSW
Hills Brumbies FC	5–1	Bondi FC
Camden Tigers	1–2	Picton Rangers

Home team	Score	Away team
Fraser Park FC	2–0	Schofield Scorpions
St George FC	3–0	Gladesville Ryde Magic
San Souci	1–4	Dulwich Hill
Tarrawanna	2–2 (11–10 pens)	Liverpool Sports Club
Mounties Wanderers FC	1–3	Canberra FC
Mt Druitt Town Rangers	4–3	Canberra Olympic
Macarthur Rams	0–1	Northern Tigers FC
Bankstown Berries FC	4–1	Rydalmere FC
Inter Lions	1–2	Fairfield City Lions
Spirit FC	4–1	Stanmore Hawks
Nepean FC	3–1	West City FC

== Third round ==
The twenty winners from Round Two were joined by the twelve clubs from the NSW Premier League.

Home team	Score	Away team
Parramatta Eagles	2–1	Dulwich Hill
Fraser Park	2–0	Fairfield City Lions
St George	3–1	Hills Brumbies
Marconi Stallions	1–0	Sydney Olympic
Blacktown Spartans	0–1	University of NSW
Tarrawanna	1–4	Dapto Dandaloo
Bonnyrigg White Eagles	6–0	Balmain
Bankstown City Lions	4–2	Hills Pumas

Home team	Score	Away team
South Coast Wolves	1–0	Northern Tigers
Bankstown Berries	3–0	Picton Rangers
Rockdale City Suns	5–0	Prospect United
APIA Leichhardt Tigers	2–0	Nepean FC
Sutherland Sharks	1–0	Manly United
Southern Bulls	2–6 aet	Canberra FC
Mt Druitt Town Rangers	0–4	Spirit FC
Sydney United	0–1	Blacktown City

== Fourth round ==
Home team	Score	Away team
Bankstown City Lions	2–0	South Coast Wolves
Parramatta Eagles	0–1	Marconi Stallions
Sutherland Sharks	3–0	Fraser Park
Blacktown City	8–0	University of NSW

Home team	Score	Away team
APIA Leichhardt Tigers	3–0	St George
Rockdale City Suns	1–1 (3–4 pens)	Dapto Dandaloo
Bankstown Berries	3–2	Canberra FC
Spirit FC	1–4	Bonnyrigg White Eagles

== Quarter finals ==
The quarter final draw was conducted on 23 May 2012.

Home team	Score	Away team
Marconi Stallions	0–5	APIA Leichhardt Tigers
Sutherland Sharks	1–0	Blacktown City
Bonnyrigg White Eagles	0–3	Bankstown Berries
Dapto Dandaloo	6–2	Bankstown City Lions

== Semi-finals ==
The semi final draw was conducted on 8 June 2012.

20 June 2012
7:15pm

Sutherland Sharks (New South Wales)	2–1	(New South Wales) Dapto Dandaloo
Price 35'; Bailey 55'		Reid 14'

Seymour Shaw Park
Referee: Adam Susz
20 June 2012
7:30pm

APIA Leichhardt Tigers (New South Wales)	2–1	(New South Wales) Bankstown Berries
Parisi 22'; Casey 78' (pen.)		Adjassou 58'

Lambert Park
Referee: ?

== Grand final ==
8 July 2012
3:00pm

Sutherland Sharks (New South Wales)	4–1	(New South Wales) APIA Leichhardt Tigers
Price 7'; Bailey 23'; Powell 56'; Nikas 84'	Report	El Jamal 87'

Cromer Park
Attendance: ~500
Referee: Kris Griffiths Jones
