= 2007 Waratah Cup =

TigerTurf Cup

Tournament details
- Country: Australia (NSW)

Final positions
- Champions: Wollongong Wolves (2nd title)
- Runners-up: Manly United

The 2007 Waratah Cup (known as the TigerTurf Cup for sponsorship reasons) was the 11th season of the Waratah Cup since its initial re-introduction in 1991, and the 27th season as the premier domestic cup competition in New South Wales since inauguration in 1957. It was the first year with TigerTurf involvement, replacing the Continental Tyres Cup (2004–2006). The company was keen to unite with Soccer NSW to assist with the promotion of their FIFA approved artificial turf surfaces.

The defending champions were National Premier Leagues NSW side Sydney United 58 FC.

The champions were the Wollongong Wolves, defeating Manly United 3–2 in the final.

The total prize pool was $50,000, with the winners receiving $16,000 and the runners-up $6,000.

== Teams ==
The first two rounds see association based teams and State League based teams enter the competition before Premier League teams enter in the third round (final 32).

Round	Clubs remaining	Clubs involved	Winners from previous round	New entries this round	Leagues entering at this round	Scheduled playing date
Round 1	52	14	n/a	14	NSW Association and State League teams	3–5 April
Round 2	46	28	8	20	NSW State League teams	17–19 April
Final 32	32	32	14	18	All 10 NSW Premier League teams 8 NSW Super League teams	8–10 May
Final 16	16	16	16	0	none	23 May
Quarter-finals	8	8	8	0	none	6 June
Semi-finals	4	4	4	0	none	17 June
Final	2	2	2	0	none	7 July

== First Round ==
There were 8 scheduled matches for the first round, with NSW Association teams entering the competition in this round. One team from the Super League, the Northern Tigers were also entrants in this round. Two matches, however, included byes for the Illawarra Premier League side, Dandaloo FC and the Sutherland District side, Cronulla RSL Youth Club.

Tie no	Home team (Tier)	Score	Away team (Tier)	Date
1	Epping YMCA (–)	1–2	Lilli Pilli FC (–)	Tuesday, 3 April 2007
2	Miranda Magpies (–)	1–2	Epping Eastwood FC (–)	Thursday, 5 April 2007
3	West Pymble FC (–)	1–3	Bankstown Sports Strikers (–)	Tuesday, 3 April 2007
4	Bye	—	Dandaloo FC (–)	
5	West Pennant Hills Cherrybrook (–)	0–2	Gymea United (–)	Tuesday, 3 April 2007
6	Bye	—	Cronulla RSL Youth Club (-)	
7	Hurlstone Park Wanderers (–)	6–1	Lugarno (–)	Thursday, 5 April 2007
8	Picton Rangers (–)	0–0	Northern Tigers (2)	Tuesday, 3 April 2007
Northern Tigers advanced 4–2 on penalties.

== Second Round ==
Three new teams from the Super League (tier 2), as well as teams from the NSW State League (tier 3) and the Conference League (tier 4) entered this round, joining the surviving clubs from the First Round.

Tie no	Home team (Tier)	Score	Away team (Tier)
Matches played on Tuesday, 17 April 2007.
9	Spirit FC (3)	5–0	Roosters FC (4)
10	Sydney Wanderers (3)	1–2	Dandaloo FC (–)
11	St George FC (2)	10–1	Lakemba Sports (4)
12	Springwood (3)	1–2	Balmain SC (4)
13	Gymea United (–)	0–6	Macarthur Rams (2)
14	Greenisland FC (4)	3–1	Bankstown Sports Strikers (–)
15	Lilli Pilli FC (–)	1–3 (†)	Prospect United (4)

Tie no	Home team (Tier)	Score	Away team (Tier)
16	University of NSW (3)	3–1 (†)	Hakoah (4)
19	Gazy Lansvale (4)	0–5	Epping Eastwood (–)
Matches played on Thursday, 19 April 2007.
17	Mt. Pritchard (3)	7–0	Cronulla RSL Youth Club (–)
18	Canterbury Bankstown Berries (3)	2–0	Ryde City (3)
20	Fraser Park FC (2)	2–0	Hills Brumbies (3)
21	Hurlstone Park Wanderers (–)	1–2	Hurstville City Minotaurs (4)
22	Northern Tigers (2)	4–0	White City (4)

== Third Round ==
A further eight Super League clubs and all ten Premier League clubs entered this round, joining the fourteen surviving teams from the second round as the final 32 teams.

Tie no	Home team (Tier)	Score	Away team (Tier)
Matches played on Tuesday, 8 May 2007
23	Sydney Olympic (1)	5–1	Epping Eastwood (–)
25	Rockdale City Suns (2)	1–0	Bonnyrigg White Eagles (2)
26	St George FC (2)	3–5	Mt. Druitt Town (2)
27	Granville Rage (2)	1–6	Sutherland Sharks (1)
28	Mt. Pritchard (3)	1–2	Hurstville City Minotaurs (4)
29	Fairfield City Lions (2)	0–3	Blacktown City Demons (1)
30	Balmain SC (4)	1–2	Marconi Stallions (1)
32	Sydney United (1)	1–2	Stanmore Hawks (2)
35	APIA Leichhardt Tigers (1)	2–1	Spirit FC (3)
36	Fraser Park FC (2)	1–1	Macarthur Rams (2)
Fraser Park advanced 6–5 on penalties.

Tie no	Home team (Tier)	Score	Away team (Tier)
Match played on Wednesday, 9 May 2007
24	Canterbury Bankstown Berries (3)	0–10	Manly United (1)
Matches played on Thursday, 10 May 2007
31	Sydney University (2)	0–0	Northern Tigers (2)
Northern Tigers advanced 4–2 on penalties.
33	Prospect United (4)	0–2	Dandaloo FC (–)
34	Bankstown City Lions (1)	1–2	Penrith Nepean United (1)
37	PCYC Parramatta (2)	1–1	University of NSW (3)
PCYC Parramatta advanced 9–8 on penalties.
38	Wollongong Wolves (1)	3–0	Greenisland SFC (4)

== Fourth Round ==
Dandaloo FC were the lowest ranked and the only grassroots football club left in the competition. Of the fifteen remaining sides, 8 were from the Premier League, 6 were from the Super League and 1 from the Conference League.

Tie no	Home team (Tier)	Score	Away team (Tier)
Matches played on Tuesday, 22 May 2007
39	Penrith Nepean United (1)	0–5	Marconi Stallions (1)
40	Wollongong Wolves (1)	4–2	Fraser Park FC (2)
42	Northern Tigers (2)	1–2	Sutherland Sharks (1)
44	APIA Leichhardt Tigers (1)	0–2	PCYC Parramatta (2)

Tie no	Home team (Tier)	Score	Away team (Tier)
45	Manly United (1)	3–1	Stanmore Hawks (2)
46	Blacktown City Demons (1)	3–1	Sydney Olympic (1)
Matches played on Thursday, 24 May 2007
41	Hurstville City Minotaurs (4)	0–3	Rockdale City Suns (2)
43	Dandaloo FC (–)	4–2	Mt. Druitt Town (2)

== Quarter-finals ==
Dandaloo FC continued their run into the quarter-finals, as the only grassroots to club to do so. The other seven entrants were from the Premier and Super Leagues. All matches were played on Wednesday, 6 June 2007.

Tie no	Home team (Tier)	Score	Away team (Tier)
47	PCYC Parramatta (2)	0–2	Wollongong Wolves (1)
48	Marconi Stallions (1)	1–1 (†)	Dandaloo FC (–)
Dandaloo FC won 5–3 on penalties.
49	Sutherland Sharks (1)	0–1	Manly United (1)
50	Blacktown City Demons (1)	4–0	Rockdale City Suns (2)

== Semi-finals ==
Of the remaining four teams, only one was from grassroots football, Dandaloo FC. The other three clubs were all from the Premier League.

17 June 2007
13:00 AEST (UTC+10:00)

Blacktown City Demons	1–4 (a.e.t.)	Manly United

Seymour Shaw Park, Miranda
17 June 2007
15:00 AEST (UTC+10:00)

Dandaloo FC	1–3	Wollongong Wolves

Seymour Shaw Park, Miranda

== Final ==
The grand final was played on Sunday, 8 July 2007 on the artificial turf of Seymour Shaw Park laid by sponsors, TigerTurf.

8 July 2007
17:00 AEST (UTC+10:00)

Manly United	2–3	Wollongong Wolves
Mihalojvic 23'; Hamad 60'		Aliffi 55' (pen.), 80' (pen.); Ederaro 71'

Seymour Shaw Park, Miranda

GK	1	(Australia) Brad Swancott
DF		(Australia) Pascal Julliard
MF	8	(Australia) Michael Williams	Substituted off
FW	9	(Australia) Robbie Cattanach
MF	7	(Australia) Ashley Ryan
MF	16	(Australia) Joey Schirripa
MF	17	(Australia) Michael Cunico
DF	18	(Australia) Beau Busch
DF		(Australia) Richard Williams	Substituted off
DF		(Australia) Roberto Hamad
FW		(Australia) Dusan Mihaljovic	Substituted off
Substitutes:
MF		(Australia) Michael Lloyd-Green	Substituted on
		(Australia) Dominic Rossi	Substituted on
FW	10	(England) Craig Midgley	Substituted on
Coach:
(Australia) Phil Moss

GK	20	(Australia) Zlatko Josevski
DF	4	(Australia) Michael West
MF	17	(Australia) Ben Blake
MF	5	(Australia) Steve Hayes
FW	6	(Australia) Daniel Aliffi
DF	2	(Australia) Matt Hunter	Substituted off
MF	8	(Australia) Dustin Wells
FW	14	(Australia) Danial Cummins
MF	15	(Guinea) Ballamodou Conde
FW	18	(Nigeria) Osagie Ederaro	Substituted off
DF	12	(Australia) Chris Price	Substituted off
Substitutes:
DF	16	(Australia) Tynan Diaz	Substituted on
DF	3	(Australia) Wayne Heath	Substituted on
FW	13	(Australia) Dean Kerr	Substituted on
Coach:
(Australia) John Turner

NSW Waratah State Cup
2007 Champions

Wollongong Wolves FC
Second Title
