= 1960 NSW Federation Cup =

Ascot Thousand

Tournament details
- Country: Australia (NSW)
- Teams: 16

Final positions
- Champions: Sydney Hakoah
- Runners-up: Prague

Tournament statistics
- Matches played: 16
- Goals scored: 76 (4.75 per match)

The 1960 NSW Federation Cup was the fourth edition of the NSW Soccer Federation's premier soccer cup. This was the second season the tournament received sponsorship by W.D. & H.O. Wills and was called the "Ascot Thousand" after their popular cigarette. The cup was contested by all fourteen first division clubs and the top two placed second division clubs in the premiership. The £1000 prize money was divided among the first four placings, with first place receiving £600, second place £250, third place £100 and fourth place £50.

Sydney Hakoah were the defending champions, having beaten Sydney Prague 2–0 in last year's final. They were eliminated in the first round by Bankstown, who went on to defeat reigning Ampol Cup champions, Budapest 2–1 in the semi-finals.

The final was played on 23 October 1960 between Bankstown and league champions, Canterbury-Marrickville. Bankstown won the match 1–0 to claim their first title.

== Format and clubs ==
Round	Clubs remaining	Clubs advancing from previous round	New entries this round	Main match dates
First Round	16	N/A	14 clubs from NSW First Division; 2 clubs from NSW Second Division	7–28 Sep 1960
Quarter-finals	8	8 winners from First Round	none	8–9 Oct 1960
Semi-finals	4	4 winners from quarter-finals	none	16 Oct 1960
Third place playoff and Final	4	2 losers from semi-finals enter Third place playoff; 2 winners from semi-finals enter Final	none	23 Oct 1960

== First Round ==
Tie	Team 1 (div.)	Score	Team 2 (div.)	Date
1	Polonia (2)	4–3	North Side-E.P.T. (1)	7 September 1960
2	APIA Leichhardt (1)	5–1	Balgownie (1)	7 September 1960
3	Canterbury-Marrickville (1)	8–4	Pan Hellenic (2)	14 September 1960
4	Budapest (1)	3–0	Corrimal United (1)	14 September 1960
5	Prague (1)	4–3	Granville AEK (1)	21 September 1960
6	Auburn (1)	5–2	Sydney Austral (1)	21 September 1960
7	Gladesville-Ryde (1)	6–0	Manly-Warringah (1)	28 September 1960
8	Bankstown (1)	2–1	Hakoah (1)	28 September 1960

== Finals ==
=== Quarter-finals ===
8 October 1960

Canterbury-Marrickville	5–2	Polonia

8 October 1960

Gladesville-Ryde	0–3	Bankstown

9 October 1960

Prague	1–2	Auburn

9 October 1960

APIA Leichhardt	1–2	Budapest

=== Semi-finals ===
16 October 1960

Canterbury-Marrickville	3–2	Auburn

16 October 1960

Bankstown	2–1	Budapest

=== Third place playoff ===
23 October 1960

Budapest	5–1	Auburn

Henson Park, Marrickville

=== Final ===
23 October 1960

Bankstown	1–0	Canterbury-Marrickville

Henson Park, Marrickville

NSW Federation Cup
1960 Champions

Bankstown
First Title
