= 2024 Waratah Cup =

Tournament details
- Country: Australia (NSW)
- Dates: 17 July – 14 August (finals); 5 March – 5 June (prelim.)
- Teams: 4 (finals); 159 (prelim.)

Final positions
- Champions: APIA Leichhardt
- Runners-up: Rockdale Ilinden

The 2024 Waratah Cup was the 22nd season of the Football NSW's knockout competition. The four winners from the Australia Cup preliminary seventh round qualified for the Waratah Cup. Sydney United 58 were the defending champions but were eliminated by NWS Spirit in the seventh round. APIA Leichhardt won 3–0 in the final against Rockdale Ilinden to claim their sixth cup title at Jubilee Stadium. Michael Kouta, who scored the opening goal for APIA, was named player of the match.

== Background ==
=== Preliminary round ===
The draw for round 2 involved 88 association clubs (level 5) and was announced in February 2024. Clubs from NSW League One and League Two were drawn in round 3. The draw for round 4 was announced in March and included teams from the National Premier Leagues NSW. Youth teams of the A-League Men were not eligible to participate in the cup.

=== Format and dates ===
Round	Clubs remaining	Winners from previous round	New entries this round	Main match dates
Round 2	159	–	88	5–12 March
Round 3	115	44	58	19–27 March
Round 4	64	51	13	8–24 April
Round 5	32	32	–	23 April–14 May
Round 6	16	16	–	15–28 May
Round 7	8	8	–	28 May–5 June

=== Qualified clubs ===
The four qualified clubs were Rockdale Ilinden, NWS Spirit, Blacktown City and APIA Leichhardt, all of whom compete in the National Premier Leagues NSW. From the seventh round, Rockdale Ilinden won 9–1 against Phoenix FC, the latter based in the football association of the Eastern Suburbs. NWS Spirit overcame defending champions Sydney United to progress, while APIA Leichhardt and Blacktown City defeated Marconi Stallions and Inter Lions in their respective matches. In addition to the Waratah Cup, the four clubs qualified to the Round of 32 of the 2024 Australia Cup.

Rockdale played against NWS Spirit in the semi-final, having won their first head-to-head match over the latter in the 2024 league season. Rockdale competed in their third cup appearance and for their first cup title. Spirit are previous cup winners, claiming the trophy in 2022, and appeared for their second Waratah Cup campaign. Blacktown City played against APIA Leichhardt in the semi-final. Both sides have won the cup five times and won once in the clashes between them during the 2024 league season.

Route to the Waratah Cup
R	Rockdale Ilinden		NWS Spirit		Blacktown City		APIA Leichhardt	
R	Opponent	Result	Opponent	Result	Opponent	Result	Opponent	Result
4	Manly United	2–2 (a.e.t.; 4–2 p)	Albion Park White Eagles	1–4	St George City	2–1	Hazelbrook FC	19–1
5	Hakoah	2–1	Dulwich Hill	3–2	Fraser Park	3–0	Berkeley Vale S.C.	5–0
6	Wollongong Wolves	2–0	Sydney Olympic	3–1 (a.e.t.)	Northbridge FC	4–0	Blacktown Spartans	5–2
7	Phoenix FC	9–1	Sydney United 58	2–1	Inter Lions	5–1	Marconi Stallions	2–1

== Semi-final ==
17 July
19:30 AEST (UTC+10)

Rockdale Ilinden	5–0	NWS Spirit
Urosevski 22'; R.Speranza 42'; Antoniou 44'; Sunmola 64'; Pelekanos (yellow card) 67'; Ovens 71'	Report	Lum (yellow card) 49'; Frerck (yellow card) 67'

Rockdale
Rockdale Ilinden Sports Centre
Referee: Ivica Covic

24 July
19:30 AEST (UTC+10)

Blacktown City	2–5	APIA Leichhardt
Gibbs 60' (pen.), 89'	Report	Gibson 18', 90+2'; Jordan 34'; Segreto 41'; Stewart 63'

Seven Hills
Landen Stadium
Referee: Brodie Merchant

== Final ==
14 August
19:30 AEST (UTC+10)

Rockdale Ilinden	0–3	APIA Leichhardt
Collins (yellow card) 6'; Speranza (yellow card) 79'	Report	Kouta 7'; Ucchino (yellow card) 26' (yellow-red card) 68'; Jordan 40'; S.Symons (yellow card) 47'; Armson 65'; Bouzanis (yellow card) 80'

Carlton
Jubilee Stadium
Referee: Jake Rose
