= 2023 Waratah Cup =

Tournament details
- Country: Australia (NSW)
- Dates: 14 June – 10 September (finals); 11 March – 6 June (prelim.)
- Teams: 4 (finals); 187 (prelim.)

Final positions
- Champions: Sydney United 58
- Runners-up: APIA Leichhardt

The 2023 Waratah Cup was the 21st season of the Football NSW's knockout competition. The four winners from the Australia Cup preliminary seventh round qualified for the Waratah Cup. NWS Spirit were the defending champions but were eliminated by the eventual winners Sydney United 58 in the seventh round. Sydney United won the cup, their seventh in history, against APIA Leichhardt in extra time.

== Background ==
=== Preliminary round ===
The first draw was hosted in March 2023 at the headquarters of Football NSW and involved a total of 127 grassroots clubs (level 5) drawn for Rounds 2 and 3. Clubs from NSW League One and League Two were also included in the draw. The Round 4 draw was announced in late March 2023 and included clubs from the National Premier Leagues NSW.

=== Format and dates ===
Round	Clubs remaining	Winners from previous round	New entries this round	Main match dates
Round 2	187	–	126	5–19 March
Round 3	116	53	49	11 March–10 April
Round 4	64	52	12	4–26 April
Round 5	32	32	–	26 April–3 May
Round 6	16	16	–	9–17 May
Round 7	8	8	–	31 May–6 June

=== Qualified clubs ===
For the 2023 edition of the Waratah Cup, Sydney United 58, APIA Leichhardt and Mt Druitt Town Rangers from the National Premier Leagues NSW progressed to the semi-final. Inter Lions, from the NSW League One, entered the Waratah Cup semi-final for the first time in the club's history after defeating Rockdale Ilinden in the seventh round. Sydney United contested for their seventh cup title, the most won by any club.

Qualified clubs
Sydney United 58 (2)	APIA Leichhardt (2)	Inter Lions (3)	Mt Druitt Town Rangers (2)

== Semi-finals ==
14 June
19:30 AEST (UTC+10)

Sydney United 58 (2)	6–1	(3) Inter Lions
Antelmi 5', 10', 41', 44'; Trifiro 21'; Payne 88'	Report	Duke (yellow card) 38', (goal) 85'; Patramanis (yellow card) 50'

Edensor Park
Sydney United Sports Centre
Referee: Stephen Lucas

26 July
19:15 AEST (UTC+10)

APIA Leichhardt (2)	2–1	(2) Mt Druitt Town Rangers
Stewart 2', 35'; Armson (yellow card) 86'; Muata-Marlow (yellow card) 89'; Ucchino (yellow card) 90'	Report	Gallo (yellow card) 16'; Katsuta 42'; Elrich (yellow card) 53'; Faisal (yellow card) 83'; Macerola (yellow card) 90'

Leichhardt
Lambert Park
Referee: Craig Fisher

== Final ==
10 September
15:00 AEST (UTC+10)

Sydney United 58	3–1 (a.e.t.)	APIA Leichhardt
Perkatis (yellow card) 38'; Vlastelica (yellow card) 44'; Jennings 45+2'; Antelmi (yellow card) 45+2', (goal) 110'; Bakmaz (yellow card) 69'; Kaneko 111'	Report	S.Symons (yellow card) 12' (yellow-red card) 39'; Jordan 36'; J.Symons (yellow card) 45+2'; D'Apuzzo (yellow card) 90+5'; Denmead (yellow card) 115'

Lilyfield
Leichhardt Oval
Referee: Sam Kelly
