= 2025 Waratah Cup =

Australian soccer tournament season

Tournament details
- Country: Australia
- Dates: 11 June – 2 July 2025
- Teams: 4

Final positions
- Champions: Sydney United (8th title)
- Runners-up: Northern Tigers

Tournament statistics
- Matches played: 3
- Goals scored: 8 (2.67 per match)

The 2025 Waratah Cup was the 23rd season of the Waratah Cup. The Waratah Cup was held between the four Football NSW clubs that qualified for the 2025 Australia Cup through the preliminary rounds.

APIA Leichhardt were the defending champions, having defeated Rockdale Ilinden in the previous season's final. They were beaten in this season's semi-final by Northern Tigers, who qualified for their first Waratah Cup final. Sydney United won the tournament, defeating Northern Tigers in the final after overcoming Southern Districts Raiders in their semi-final.

== Teams ==
The competition was held between the four Football NSW teams to qualify for the 2025 Australia Cup, having been successful in Round 7 of the preliminary rounds. Three National Premier Leagues NSW clubs qualified, APIA Leichhardt, Northern Tigers and Sydney United, along with one Football NSW League One side, Southern Districts Raiders FC.

== Semi-finals ==
The draw was announced on 29 May 2025.

11 June 2025
19:30 AEST

Sydney United (1)	2–0	SD Raiders (2)
De Oliveira 42'; Antelmi 62'	Report

Sydney United Sports Centre, Edensor Park

11 June 2025
19:30 AEST

APIA Leichhardt (1)	2–3	Northern Tigers (2)
Symons 66'; Farinella 69'	Report	Rose 46'; Alexander Brown 80'; Denton 88'

Lambert Park, Leichhardt

== Final ==
2 July 2025
19:00 AEST

Sydney United (1)	1–0	Northern Tigers (2)
Zuvela 7'	Report

Valentine Sports Park, Glenwood
Referee: Ivica Covic
