= Marconi Stallions FC =

Soccer club based in Sydney, New South Wales

- Full name: Marconi Stallions Football Club
- Nickname: Stallions
- Founded: 1958 (68 years ago)
- Ground: Marconi Stadium; Bossley Park, New South Wales
- Owner: Club Marconi
- Chairman: Robert Carniato
- Coach: Valerio Silvertro (men's)
- League: NPL NSW (men's)
- 2026: 3rd of 16
Home colours	Away colours

Marconi Stallions FC is a semi-professional soccer club based in the suburb of Bossley Park in Sydney, New South Wales (NSW). It is a section of Club Marconi, an Italian Australian social club. Its senior men's team plays in the National Premier Leagues NSW, while its senior women's team plays in the Football NSW League One Women's, in the second and third tiers of the Australian league system, respectively. It also competes in the Australian Championship as a foundation club. It plays its home games at Marconi Stadium.

One of many Italian Australian soccer clubs, Club Marconi first fielded a men's soccer team in 1958, and joined Football NSW in 1962, where it eventually gained promotion to its first division in 1970s and won back-to-back titles. It was a founding member of the National Soccer League (NSL), and competed in all 28 seasons from 1977 to 2004, winning four championships and an NSL Cup. During this time, the team was successively rebranded as the Marconi–Datsun Leopards, then Marconi Fairfield, and finally the Stallions. It returned to NSW's first division in 2005, where it has since remained, albeit for a brief spell in the second division in the mid-2010s. Its women's team last played in the first division in 2016.

The Marconi Stallions have won four NSW men's titles and two Waratah Cups. Its best performance in the Australia Cup is a round of sixteen appearance in 2019. Its rivalries include APIA Leichhardt, Sydney Olympic, and Sydney United. Its former players include Australia men's national team players Frank Farina, Paul Okon, and Mark Schwarzer; while Harry Kewell, Mathew Ryan, and Italy men's national team player Christian Vieri were products of its youth academy.

== History ==
=== Foundation and early years (1956–1976) ===
Club Marconi was founded as a bocce club in 1958 by 106 members of the Italian community in the western suburbs of Sydney. It is named after the Italian inventor and electrical engineer Guglielmo Marconi, whose Wireless company sent the first direct radio message from Great Britain to Australia. It was inaugural president Oscar Michelini who first suggested the name Marconi at the second meeting of the club's provisional committee. A statue of Guglielmo Marconi was donated by the Italian government in 1959 and it remains inside the main foyer of the club, inscribed with the message “Guglielmo Marconi, 1874 – 1937, immortal genius of the Italian nation who first with science’s wonders and spiritual wings linked Australia with the world.”

Italo-Australian artist Guido Zuliani, born in 1927, designed Club Marconi's emblem, which remains in use by the social club today. It incorporates a globe, a boomerang to symbolise Indigenous Australian culture, with the colours of green, white and red to represent the Italian heritage. The emblem is encased by Marconi's invention of wireless communication, further portrayed as a radio tower. The club's home base in Bossley Park, next to where Marconi Stadium now stands, was offered for $6900 by the brothers Ruben and Provino Sartor, two inaugural members who had visited the Yoogali Club in the rural town of Griffith, New South Wales to learn how the Italian community there had founded their own social organisation.

The soccer club first appeared in 1958 as a youth team, and the first senior side competed in the 1961 NSW amateur championship that it won by 8 points.

The club gradually moved up the ranks in the NSW soccer system, eventually gaining promotion to the NSW 1st Division in 1970. By this point the club had come of age. Marconi became back-to-back champions of the NSW 1st Division in 1972 and 1973, and continued to challenge for honours up until 1976. The next year, 1977, Marconi and 13 other clubs formed the first ever truly national sports competition in Australia, the National Soccer League.

=== National Soccer League (1977–2004) ===
Chart of yearly table positions for Marconi Stallions in NSL

In its first season in the NSL in 1977, Marconi finished second on goal difference to Eastern Suburbs (Sydney City). In 1979, Marconi was Australian champions. The club won the NSL Cup in 1980.

Ahead of the 1981 National Soccer League season, Marconi signed a sponsorship deal with car manufacturer Datsun under which the club were known as Marconi-Datsun Leopards.

What is generally described as the club's "golden era" started in the late 1980s, when some of the finest players in Australia made their way to what was then known as "the Palace". The club made three consecutive Grand Final appearances in 1988, 1989 and 1989–90, winning the 1988 and 1989, but lost the 1989–90 decider. Marconi were also minor premiers in 1989 and 1989–90, and won the 1992–93 Grand Final.

In 1995–96 under former Socceroo Manfred Schaefer, Marconi won another Minor Premiership, finishing one point ahead of Melbourne Knights and Sydney Olympic. In the finals series, Marconi made it to yet another Grand Final, this time going down 2–1 to Melbourne Knights at Olympic Park in Melbourne.

Marconi made the finals for the next five consecutive seasons, before experiencing two poor seasons. In 2003–04, the final NSL season, Marconi again made the Finals, but the 1995–96 minor premiership ended up being the final trophy win during the club's time in the NSL.

=== NSW Premier League/National Premier Leagues NSW 1 (2004–2015) ===
Logo of Marconi Stallions from 2004 until 2021.

After the 2003–04 NSL season the competition was ceased. Marconi entered the NSW Premier League for the 2004–05 season. Between 2004 and 2011 in the NSW Premier League the club had mixed results, with their best season in 2009 when they finished second.

In 2012 the club rebounded and the Marconi Stallions were the Champions of the NSW Premier League. After a third placed league finish, Marconi beat Sydney Olympic 2–0 in the Qualifying Final, then lost to Bonnyrigg White Eagles FC 2–0 in the Major Semi-Final. In the Preliminary Final they faced Blacktown City Demons who led 2–1 at half time, but Marconi scored 3 unanswered goals in the second half to win 4–2. In the Grand Final, they came up against the minor premiers and favourites Bonnyrigg at their ground. Bonnyrigg had won the league by 15 points and had already beaten Marconi in the finals series, but Marconi won the Championship with two second half goals to win 2–0.

In late 2013 the Marconi Stallions were accepted into the newly formed National Premier Leagues NSW. The NPL NSW replaced the previous NSW Premier League. In their first season in the NPL NSW in 2014, Marconi finished in 8th place in the 12-team division.

=== Relegation and Promotion (2015–2017) ===
Marconi was relegated to the NPL NSW 2 on 16 August 2015, after enduring the worst season in its history. The Stallions earned just seven points all season and, after a mass player exodus, ended the season with ten consecutive defeats.

The Stallions began their rebuilding campaign in October 2015 with the aim of getting straight back in the top state division. They signed former A-League players Sean Rooney, Mirjan Pavlović and Marko Ješić. Marconi qualified for the 2016 FFA Cup and drew Victorian side Hume City in the Round of 32. Marconi sacked head coach Jeff Suzor in mid-July 2016. Marconi were defeated by Hume City despite taking the lead in the first half of extra time, as Hume managed a 117th-minute equaliser and then won the clash on penalties. Marconi finished the NPL 2 season in 4th place, failing to achieve its target of promotion, despite Rooney, Pavlovic and Jesic scoring 51 goals between them.

In September 2017, Marconi won the NPL NSW 2 Grand Final, having already won the premiership by 18 points, and returned to the New South Wales top flight. Sean Rooney won the league golden boot with 27 goals. In January 2018 Marconi signed AFC Champions League-winning midfielder Mateo Poljak. The Stallions finished in 6th place in its first season back in the top-flight.

Marconi won the 2019 Waratah Cup, defeating Sydney United 58 FC 2–1.

=== Move to Australian Championship (from 2025) ===
The club was announced on 20 November 2023, as one of the eight foundation teams for the Australian Championship, due to start either March or April 2025. They will continue to play in the NPL NSW for the 2024 and 2025 season, before transitioning to the new league.

== Stadium ==
The Marconi Stallions' home games are played at the 9000-capacity Marconi Stadium in the suburb of Bossley Park in Sydney's west; a venue known affectionately by players and fans as the Palace.

== Rivalries ==
Sydney Olympic

Marconi vs Sydney Olympic has always been one of the most relevant rivalries in Australian soccer. Over the time, there has been a number of memorable matches. Notable differences are in the fan base. Both clubs were backed by large migrant populations, which was of Italians for Marconi and Greeks for the Olympic.

Sydney United 58

Marconi has a rivalry with Sydney United due to the close proximity of the two clubs. Sydney United is located in Edensor Park and play out of King Tomislav Club which is only 1 km south of Club Marconi. The Croatian club have been rivals of the Stallions since 1971 when Marconi were promoted to the State League.

APIA Leichhardt

The Stallions and APIA have a friendly rivalry. These two clubs are the two Italian backed clubs in New South Wales. The two clubs compete every season in the Italian Derby.

== Current squad ==
=== First-team ===
As of 15 October, 2026

Note: Flags indicate national team as defined under FIFA eligibility rules; some limited exceptions apply. Players may hold more than one non-FIFA nationality.

No.	Pos.	Nation	Player
1	GK	AUS	Joel Wade
2	DF	AUS	Tyren Burnie
3	DF	AUS	Cameron Windust
4	DF	AUS	Anton Mlinaric
5	DF	AUS	George Daniel
6	FW	SSD	Teng Kuol
7	MF	URU	Franco Maya
8	MF	JPN	Seita Murai
9	FW	AUS	Damian Tsekenis
10	FW	AUS	Marko Jesic

No.	Pos.	Nation	Player
11	MF	JPN	Tomohiro Ogawa
12	MF	AUS	Julian Monge
14	MF	AUS	Jack Armson
15	DF	AUS	Aleksandar Duricic
17	FW	AUS	Mitchell Glasson (on loan from Sydney FC)
20	GK	AUS	Oliver Yates
21	MF	AUS	Noah Anderson
23	MF	AUS	Quinten Blair
27	FW	AUS	Mikah Chilas
—	FW	AUS	Jayden Grumley
—	FW	AUS	Sunday Yona
—	MF	MRI	Stephan de Robillard

== Notable players ==
Marconi has produced at least six former captains of the Australia national soccer team, as well as former Internazionale and Italian national team striker Christian Vieri, who came through its junior ranks while his father Roberto lived and played in Sydney. Other Marconi youth products include former Leeds United, Liverpool and Australian winger Harry Kewell, former Middlesbrough and national team goalkeeper Mark Schwarzer, current AS Roma goalkeeper and national team captain Mathew Ryan, ex-Lazio and Fiorentina midfielder Paul Okon, and former Bari striker Frank Farina, who went on to coach the Australia men's national soccer team.

== Seasons ==
=== Key ===
Key to league competitions:

- NSL – Australia's top league, beginning in 1977 before folding in 2004.
- AC – Australia's second league, beginning in 2025 after foundation in 2017.
- NSW Premier League or NPL NSW 1 – NSW Regional top league.
- NPL NSW 2 – NSW Regional second division.

Key to colours and symbols:

1st or W	Winners
2nd or RU	Runners-up
3rd	Third
	Relegated
♦	Top scorer in division

Key to league record:

- Season = The year and article of the season
- Pos = Final position
- Pld = Games played
- W = Games won
- D = Games drawn
- L = Games lost
- GF = Goals scored
- GA = Goals against
- Pts = Points

Key to cup record:

- En-dash (—) = Did not qualify
- GS = Group stage
- 1R, 2R...7R = 1st Round, 2nd Round...7th Round
- R32 = Round of 32
- R16 = Round of 16
- QF = Quarter-final
- SF = Semi-final
- RU = Runners-up
- W = Winners

=== Seasons ===
Results of league and cup competitions by season
Season	Division	P	W	D	L	F	A	Pts	Pos	Finals	Waratah Cup	Competition	Result	Name	Goals
Season	League									Finals	Waratah Cup	Other		Top goalscorer (Note: Includes goals scored in the National Premier Leagues NSW regular season and finals.)	
1991–92	National Soccer League	26	10	5	11	33	31	25	7th	—	?				
1992–93	National Soccer League	26	17	2	7	57	29	53	2nd	W	?				
1993–94	National Soccer League	26	11	9	6	52	33	42	4th	SF	?				
1994–95	National Soccer League	24	6	7 (Note: Draws were decided by penalty shoot-out (PSO). Marconi had 4 PSO wins and 3 PSO losses.)	11	34	43	35 (Note: Due to penalty shoot-outs (PSO) deciding draws, points were awarded as: 4 points for outright win, 2 points for PSO win, 1 point for PSO loss, 0 points for outright loss.)	10th	—	?				
1995–96	National Soccer League	33	17	9	7	58	35	60	1st	RU	?				
1996–97	National Soccer League	26	12	4	10	41	37	40	5th	EF	SF				
1997–98	National Soccer League	26	12	7	7	33	25	43	5th	PF	SF				
1998–99	National Soccer League	28	15	3	10	53	47	48	4th	SF					
1999–2000	National Soccer League	34	16	7	11	53	49	55	5th	EF					
2000–01	National Soccer League	30	14	8	8	42	33	50	5th	EF					
2001–02	National Soccer League	24	8	6	10	33	36	30	9th	—					
2002–03	National Soccer League	24	6	5	13	25	42	23	12th	—					
2003–04	National Soccer League	24	10	8	6	29	25	38	4th	EF	?				
2004–05	NSW Premier League	22	8	7	7	32	29	31	2nd (Note: The 2004–05 NSW Premier League season was played with teams playing each other once over 15 rounds then forming two leagues (top half named 'Champions League' and bottom half 'Challengers League'. Marconi was placed second in Challengers League.)	SF	?				
2006	NSW Premier League	18	10	2	6	42	25	32	3rd	SF	?				
2007	NSW Premier League	18	8	6	4	34	27	30	3rd	SF	?				
2008	NSW Premier League	22	3	10	9	29	41	19	9th	—	?				
2009	NSW Premier League	22	11	6	5	44	22	39	2nd	RU	?				
2010	NSW Premier League	22	11	3	8	26	26	36	5th	EF	W				
2011	NSW Premier League	22	6	8	8	28	25	26	9th	—	3R				
2012	NSW Premier League	22	12	2	8	32	28	38	3rd	W	QF				
2013	NPL NSW 1	22	11	4	7	29	26	37	5th	QF	R16				
2014	NPL NSW 1	22	7	4	11	28	36	25	8th	—	5R				
2015	NPL NSW 1	22	2	1	19	14	55	7	12th	—	4R				
2016	NPL NSW 2	26	13	5	8	65	53	44	4th	EF	SF	FFA Cup	R32		
2017	NPL NSW 2	26	20	2	4	70	29	62	1st	W	6R				
2018	NPL NSW 1	22	8	6	8	30	34	30	6th	—	SF	FFA Cup	R32		
2019	NPL NSW 1	22	10	2	10	42	30	32	5th	QF	W	FFA Cup	R16		
2020	NPL NSW 1	11	4	2	5	14	14	14	7th	—	cancelled				
2021	NPL NSW 1	cancelled								cancelled	cancelled				
2022	NPL NSW 1	22	10	2	10	42	30	32	4th	QF	5R			Marko Jesic	14
2023	NPL NSW 1	30	17	5	8	64	35	56	4th	–	5R			Jordan Swibel	15
2024	NPL NSW 1	30	21	2	7	70	35	35	2nd	W	7R			Marko Jesic	20
2025	NPL NSW 1								TBD		7R				
2025	Australian Championship								2nd	RU					
2026	NPL NSW								TBD						
2026	Australian Championship								TBD						

== Honours ==
=== National Soccer League ===
- NSL Championship

Champions (4) – 1979, 1988, 1989, 1992–93

- NSL Premiership

Minor Premiers (3) – 1989, 1989–90, 1995–96

- NSL Cup

Winners (1) – 1980

=== National Premier Leagues ===
- National Premier Leagues NSW Championship

Champions (4): 1972, 1973, 2012, 2024

- National Premier Leagues NSW 2 Premiership

Premiers (1): 2017

- National Premier Leagues NSW 2 Championship

Champions (1): 2017

=== Academy ===
- National Youth League Championship

Champions (2): 1988, 1995–96

=== Individual ===
- Brad Maloney won the Johnny Warren Medal while playing for Marconi in the 1998–99 NSL season.

== Divisional history ==
=== By seasons ===
Seasons	Division	Tier	No. of seasons (cumulative)
1962–1963	NSW Federation Amateurs		
1964–1965	NSW Second Division	NSW 2	2 (2)
1966	NSW Federation Amateurs		
1967–1969	NSW Second Division	NSW 2	3 (5)
1970–1976	NSW First Division	NSW 1	7 (7)
1977–2004	National Soccer League	AUS 1	28 (28)
2004–2015	NSWPL/ NPL NSW 1	NSW 1	11 (18)
2016–2017	NPL NSW 2	NSW 2	2 (8)
2018–present	NPL NSW 1	NSW 1	7 (25)
2025–present	Australian Championship	AUS 2	2

=== By tier ===
Tier	No. of seasons	Years
AUS 1	28	1977–2004
AUS 2	1	2025–
NSW 1	25	1970–1976, 2004–2015, 2018–
NSW 2	8	1964–1969, 2016–2017

Preceded by West Adelaide	NSL Champions; 1979	Succeeded by Sydney City
Preceded by APIA Leichhardt	NSL Champions; 1988–1989	Succeeded by Sydney Olympic
Preceded by Adelaide City	NSL Champions; 1992/93	Succeeded by Adelaide City
