= 2019 Waratah Cup =

Tournament details
- Country: Australia (NSW)
- Teams: 5

Final positions
- Champions: Marconi Stallions

Tournament statistics
- Matches played: 4

The 2019 Waratah Cup was the 17th season of Football NSW's knockout competition. The Preliminary Rounds are now a part of the FFA Cup competition. The 5 winners from the FFA Cup preliminary Seventh Round qualified for the Waratah Cup.

The Cup was won by Marconi Stallions, their 2nd title.

== Format ==
Round	Clubs remaining	Winners from previous round	New entries this round	Main Match Dates
Round 2	144	none	96	12–19 March
Round 3	137	89	25	16 Mar–10 Apr
Round 4	80	57	23	9 Apr–1 May
Round 5	40	40	none	24 Apr–8 May
Round 6	20	20	none	15–22 May
Round 7	10	10	none	5 June
Playoff Round	5	5	none	19 June
Semi-Finals	4	4	none	3 July
Final	2	2	none	14 July

== Preliminary rounds ==
New South Wales clubs, other than Northern NSW and A-League clubs, participate in the 2019 FFA Cup via the preliminary rounds. The competition is for all Senior Men's teams of the National Premier Leagues NSW, NPL 2, NPL 3, NSW State League, as well as Association teams which applied to participate.

A total of 144 clubs entered into the competition, including 96 grassroots clubs and the five qualifiers were:

Qualifiers
Manly United (2)	Marconi Stallions (2)	Mt Druitt Town Rangers (2)	Sydney United 58 (2)	St George FC (3)

== Elimination playoff ==
19 June 2019
19:30

Mt Druitt Town Rangers (2)	0–2	Manly United (2)
	Source

Valentine Sports Park

== Semi finals ==
3 July 2019
19:30

Marconi Stallions (2)	2–0	Manly United (2)
	Source

Hensley Athletic Field

3 July 2019
19:30

Sydney United 58 (2)	3–2	St George FC (3)
	Source

Sydney United Sports Centre

== Grand final ==
14 July 2019
14:30

Marconi Stallions (2)	2–1	Sydney United 58 (2)
Jesic 43', 70'	Report	Simonoski 28'

Lily Homes Stadium
Referee: Katie Patterson
