= 2018 Waratah Cup =

Tournament details
- Country: Australia (NSW)
- Teams: 5

Final positions
- Champions: APIA Leichhardt Tigers
- Runners-up: Hakoah Sydney City East

Tournament statistics
- Matches played: 4
- Goals scored: 17 (4.25 per match)
- Top goal scorer: Jordan Murray (4)

The 2018 Waratah Cup was the 16th season of Football NSW's knockout competition. The Preliminary Rounds are now a part of the FFA Cup competition. The 5 winners from the FFA Cup preliminary Seventh Round qualified for the Waratah Cup.

The Cup was won by APIA Leichhardt Tigers, their 5th title.

== Format ==
Round	Clubs remaining	Winners from previous round	New entries this round	Main Match Dates
Round 2	169	none	120	9–13 March
Round 3	137	88	26	14–28 March
Round 4	80	57	23	3–11 April
Round 5	40	40	none	2–9 May
Round 6	20	20	none	15–23 May
Round 7	10	10	none	30 May
Playoff Round	5	5	none	13 June
Semi-Finals	4	4	none	27 June
Final	2	2	none	15 July

== Preliminary rounds ==
New South Wales clubs, other than Northern NSW and A-League clubs, participate in the FFA Cup via the preliminary rounds. The competition is for all Senior Men's teams of the National Premier Leagues NSW, NPL 2, NPL 3, NSW State League, as well as Association teams which applied to participate.

A total of 169 clubs entered into the competition, and the five qualifiers were:

Qualifiers
APIA Leichhardt Tigers (2)	Bonnyrigg White Eagles (2)	Hakoah Sydney City East (2)	Marconi Stallions (2)	Rockdale City Suns (2)

== Elimination Playoff ==
Two of the qualifiers played-off to reduce the remaining teams to 4 teams, with the match played on 13 June.

12 June 2018

Rockdale City Suns	2–3	APIA Leichhardt
Alammedine 31'; Sorge 89'	Report	Sekiya 44'; Murray

Illinden Sports Centre, Sydney

== Semi finals ==
A total of 4 teams took part in this stage of the competition, with the matches played on 27 June.

27 June 2018
19:30 AEST

Bonnyrigg White Eagles	2–4	Hakoah Sydney City East
Diaz 33'; Vrankovic 42'	Report	Frangie; Vrankovic (o.g.); De Jong 28'; Gauthier

Valentine Sport Park, Sydney

27 June 2018
19:30 AEST

Marconi Stallions	0–3	APIA Leichhardt Tigers
	Report	Bizco 43', 80'; Symons 52'

Sydney United Sports Centre, Sydney

== Grand final ==
15 July 2018
16:00

APIA Leichhardt Tigers	3–0	Hakoah Sydney City East
Murray 10', 50'; Symons 78'	Report

Lambert Park
