= 2017 Waratah Cup =

Tournament details
- Country: Australia (NSW)
- Teams: 6

Final positions
- Champions: Hakoah Sydney City East

Tournament statistics
- Matches played: 5

The 2017 Waratah Cup was the 15th season of Football NSW's knockout competition. The Preliminary Rounds are now a part of the FFA Cup competition. The 5 winners from the FFA Cup preliminary Seventh Round qualified for the Waratah Cup, as well as the reigning National Premier Leagues champion (Sydney United 58).

The Cup was won by Hakoah Sydney City East, their 7th title.

== Format ==
Round	Clubs remaining	Winners from previous round	New entries this round	Main Match Dates
Round 2	148	none	18	11–12 March
Round 3	139	9	107	15 March-4 April
Round 4	81	58	22	29 March-2 May
Round 5	41	40	none	19 April-10 May
Round 6	21	20	none	9–24 May
Round 7	11	10	none	30–31 May
Playoff Round	6	5	1	12–14 June
Semi-Finals	4	4	none	28 June
Final	2	2	none	9 July

== Preliminary rounds ==
New South Wales clubs, other than Northern NSW and A-League clubs, participate in the FFA Cup via the preliminary rounds. The competition is for all Senior Men's teams of the National Premier Leagues NSW, NPL 2, NPL 3, NSW State League, as well as Association teams which applied to participate.

A total of 148 clubs entered into the competition, and the five qualifiers that joined Sydney United in the final rounds were:

Qualifiers
APIA Leichhardt Tigers (2)	Bankstown Berries (3)	Blacktown City (2)	Hakoah Sydney City East (2)	Hills Brumbies (3)

== Playoff round ==
Four of the qualifiers played-off to reduce the remaining teams to 4, while APIA Leichhardt Tigers and Hakoah Sydney City East received a Bye until the semi-finals.

13 June 2017
19:30

Sydney United 58	3–0	Bankstown Berries
Nikas 51'; Olsen 55'; Vranic 57'	Report

Sydney United Sports Centre

14 June 2017
19:30

Hills Brumbies	0–5	Blacktown City
	Report	Andrew 63', 65', 88'; Mallia 80', 90+'

Gabbie Stadium

== Semi finals ==
A total of 4 teams took part in this stage of the competition.

28 June 2017
19:30

Sydney United	2–3	Hakoah Sydney City East
Payne 44' (pen.); Vranic 70'	Report	26'; 37'; Jablonski 78' (pen.)

Sydney United Sports Centre

28 June 2017
19:30

Blacktown City	0–3	APIA Leichhardt Tigers
	Report	Symons 54'; Ucchino 66'; Sekiya 68'

Lilys Football Centre

== Grand final ==
9 July 2017
16:00 AEST

APIA Leichhardt Tigers	1–3	Hakoah Sydney City East
Symons 39'		L.Jones 7' (pen.); Jablonski 80'; H.Jones 90+2'

Lambert Park
