= Waratah Cup =

- Founded: 1957
- Region: New South Wales
- Teams: 159 (as of 2024)
- Current champions: Sydney United 58 (2026)
- Most championships: Sydney United 58 (9 titles)
- Website: The Waratah Cup
- 2026 Waratah Cup

The Waratah Cup is a knockout cup competition in New South Wales, run by the governing body of soccer in NSW, Football NSW. Teams competing in the Waratah Cup come from the National Premier Leagues NSW, NSW League One, NSW League Two, and numerous other semi professional & amateur association clubs within New South Wales. The Cup is held during the NPL NSW seasons. Since 2014 preliminary rounds of the Waratah Cup have been used to determine the NSW entrants to the national FFA Cup competition, now known as the Australia Cup.

== History ==
=== Federation Cup (1957–1966) and original Waratah Cup / Rothmans Cup (1970s) ===
When the federation began in 1957, it held its first member cup competition, called the NSW Federation Cup. Canterbury-Marrickville were the inaugural winners of the competition with a 4–2 victory over Gladesville-Ryde. They retained the title the following year when they defeated Prague in the final. The tournament garnered sponsorship the following season and was named the "Ascot Thousand" for two years and the "Craven A Cup" for the next years. Due to lack of sponsorship, the 1963 tournament returned to the Federation Cup naming but was also known as the Henry Seamonds Trophy from 1964, named after the late NSW and Australian Soccer Federation president. The competition continued to run for a further four years in this manner before finally dissolving due to lack of interest. After ten editions, the final tournament was held in 1966. The winners that year were APIA Leichhardt. During this period, teams competed mainly from the first division with the best placed second division clubs during the season also gaining entry into the competition to create equal numbers for the knockout tournament.

The NSW federation cup notion was re-introduced in 1971, under the banner of the Waratah Cup, with Sydney Hakoah winning the title. The 1972 edition was also held with 20 teams entering from across multiple levels of the soccer pyramid in NSW with four teams gaining entry from Northern NSW Football. There was no title held in 1973 but was re-introduced in 1974 sponsored by Rothmans. These tournaments garnered a lot of interest from many clubs with up to eight rounds being played before the quarter-finals in the 1976 edition.

With many influential clubs departing the federation with the introduction of the National Soccer League in 1977, the idea of federation wide cup tournaments were abandoned until the 1990s. However, the pre-season Ampol Cup continued during this time, often with the NSL clubs competing against the First Division clubs in the federation. In 1990, a State Challenge Cup was held by teams from the First Division, paving way for the re-introduction of the Waratah Cup.

=== Rebirth (1991–1997) and re-introduction (2004–2013) ===
In 1991, the Challenge Cup and the first division pre-season cup were replaced by the NSW Waratah State Cup. Little is known of the original format of the fledgling editions but by 1995, 99 teams were competing and 94 in 1996. In 1997, Wollongong Wolves FC won the final Waratah Cup before it was resurrected after six years in 2004.

Since this time, the competition has continued uninterrupted, save for the 2020 and 2021 editions that were cancelled due to COVID-19. The initial edition in 2004 was won by Sydney Crescent Star with an extra time win over fellow NSW Premier League team, Bonnyrigg White Eagles. In the following nine years, Sutherland were the only club to win the cup on two occasions (in 2009 and 2012) and the 2010 final was the only edition to be decided on penalties, with Marconi defeating Spirit FC after the match was still scoreless after extra time.

=== Current format (since 2014) ===
Since 2014 the Waratah Cup has become part of the qualifying competition for the FFA Cup, now known as the Australia Cup. In 2014, seven teams qualified for the Round of 32.

For 2015, the preliminary rounds of the 2015 FFA Cup replaced the early rounds of the competition; the 5 NSW qualifiers to the Round of 32 then competed for the 2015 Waratah Cup.

Starting in 2015, the reigning champions of the National Premier Leagues qualified directly for the FFA Cup proper (round of 32). Blacktown City, Sydney United, and Wollongong Wolves won the NPL national championships in 2015, 2016, and 2019 respectively. Therefore the three teams were not required to participate in FFA Cup preliminary rounds in 2016, 2017, and 2021. They were also seeded directly into final rounds of the Waratah Cup in the respective seasons, along with the other FFA Cup qualifiers from NSW.

From 2020 onwards, NSW qualification to the Round of 32 decreased to four slots instead of the previous five.

== Format ==
As the preliminary rounds form part of the Australia Cup, the final rounds occur after the Australia Cup Preliminary Seventh Round is completed. The example in the table relates to the 2023 season.

Phase	Round	Clubs remaining	Clubs involved	From previous round	Entries in this round	Teams entering at this round
Australia Cup preliminary rounds	Round 2	174	132	–	132	National Levels 6+
Australia Cup preliminary rounds	Round 3	108	88	66	22	National Levels 4–5
Australia Cup preliminary rounds	Round 4	64	64	44	20	National Levels 2–3
Australia Cup preliminary rounds	Round 5	32	32	32	none	
Australia Cup preliminary rounds	Round 6	16	16	16	none	
Australia Cup preliminary rounds	Round 7	8	8	8	none	
Finals	Semi-finals	4	4	4	none	
Finals	Final	2	2	2	none	

== Australia Cup qualifiers ==
Since 2014, the Waratah Cup preliminary rounds have acted as qualifiers for the Australia Cup.

Year	No.	Australia Cup (formerly FFA Cup) Qualifiers
2014	7	Blacktown City, Hakoah Sydney City East, Manly United, Parramatta FC, South Coast Wolves, Sydney Olympic, Sydney United 58
2015	5	Balmain Tigers, Blacktown City, Rockdale City Suns, Sydney Olympic, Sydney United 58
2016	6	Blacktown City, (Note: Blacktown City qualified as 2015 National Premier Leagues Champions.) Bonnyrigg White Eagles, Manly United, Marconi Stallions, Sydney United 58, Wollongong Wolves
2017	5	APIA Leichhardt, Bankstown Berries, Blacktown City, Hakoah Sydney City East, Hills Brumbies, Sydney United 58 (Note: Sydney United 58 qualified as 2016 National Premier Leagues Champions.)
2018	5	APIA Leichhardt, Bonnyrigg White Eagles, Hakoah Sydney City East, Marconi Stallions, Rockdale City Suns
2019	5	Manly United, Marconi Stallions, Mt Druitt Town Rangers, Sydney United 58, St George FC
~~2020~~	–	Waratah Cup and 2020 FFA Cup cancelled due to the COVID-19 pandemic in Australia.
2021	5	APIA Leichhardt, Blacktown City, Mt Druitt Town Rangers, Sydney Olympic, Wollongong Wolves (Note: Wollongong Wolves qualified as 2019 National Premier Leagues Champions.)
2022	4	Bonnyrigg White Eagles, NWS Spirit, Sydney United 58, Wollongong United
2023	4	APIA Leichhardt, Inter Lions, Mt Druitt Town Rangers, Sydney United 58
2024	4	APIA Leichhardt, Blacktown City, NWS Spirit, Rockdale Ilinden
2025	4	APIA Leichhardt, Northern Tigers, SD Raiders, Sydney United 58
2026	4	APIA Leichhardt, SD Raiders, Sydney Olympic, Sydney United 58

== Past finals ==
Below is a list of all federation cup finals since the inaugural NSW Federation of Soccer Clubs season in 1957. Please note the name changes throughout the years, due to various reasons:

- Federation Cup (1957–1966):
  - Also known as Ascot Thousand (1959–60), Craven A Cup (1961–62), Henry Seamonds Trophy (1964–66)
- Waratah State / Rothmans Cup (1971–1972, 1974–1976) and Challenge Cup (1990)
- Waratah Cup (1991–current):
  - Also known as Continental Tyres Cup (2004–2006), Tiger Turf Cup (2007–2009), McDonald's Cup (2010), TAFE NSW (2018–2019)

Year	Winners (number of titles)	Score	Runners-up
1957	Canterbury-Marrickville	4–2	Gladesville-Ryde
1958	Canterbury-Marrickville (2)	3–2	Sydney Prague
1959	Hakoah	2–0	Sydney Prague
1960	Bankstown	1–0	Canterbury-Marrickville
1961	Hakoah (2)	2–0	Canterbury-Marrickville
1962	APIA Leichhardt	5–1	Canterbury-Marrickville
1963	Hakoah Eastern Suburbs (3)	2–1	South Coast United
1964	St. George Budapest	4–3	South Coast United
1965	Hakoah Eastern Suburbs (4)	3–1	Pan Hellenic
1966	APIA Leichhardt (2)	3–2	St. George Budapest
1967–1970 No competition held
1971	Hakoah Eastern Suburbs (5)	3–2	South Sydney-Croatia
1972	St. George-Budapest (2)	3–2	Marconi-Fairfield
1973 No competition held
1974	South Sydney-Croatia	1–0	St. George-Budapest
1975	APIA Leichhardt (3)	2–0	Western Suburbs
1976	Hakoah Eastern Suburbs (6)	3–1	South Sydney-Croatia
1977–1989 No competition held
1990	Canberra Croatia	3–0	Sydney Macedonia
1991	Blacktown City	2–1	Avala
1992	Avala	4–1	Canberra Metro
1993	Blacktown City (2)	–	unknown
1994	Bankstown City (2)	2–1	Sydney Olympic
1995	Sydney United (2)	2–1	Canterbury-Marrickville
1996	Sydney United (3)	2–1 (a.e.t.)	Parramatta Eagles
1997	Wollongong Wolves	2–0	Bankstown City
1998–2003 No competition held
2004	Sydney Crescent Star	2–1 (a.e.t.)	Bonnyrigg White Eagles
2005	Sydney United (4)	3–1	Belconnen Blue Devils
2006	Blacktown City (3)	2–1	APIA Leichhardt
2007	Wollongong Wolves (2)	3–2	Manly United
2008	Bankstown City (2)	3–1	Sydney Olympic
2009	Sutherland Sharks	2–1	Manly United
2010	Marconi Stallions	0–0 (7–6(p))	Spirit FC
2011	Manly United	4–0	Mounties Wanderers
2012	Sutherland Sharks (2)	4–1	APIA Leichhardt
2013	APIA Leichhardt (4)	3–0	Sutherland Sharks
2014	Blacktown City (4)	6–2	Manly United
2015	Sydney United 58 (5)	1–0	Blacktown City
2016	Sydney United 58 (6)	1–0	Manly United
2017	Hakoah Sydney City East (7)	3–1	APIA Leichhardt
2018	APIA Leichhardt (5)	3–0	Hakoah Sydney City East
2019	Marconi Stallions (2)	2–1	Sydney United 58
~~2020~~	Waratah Cup and 2020 FFA Cup cancelled due to the COVID-19 pandemic in Australia.		
~~2021~~	Cancelled due to the COVID-19 pandemic.		
2022	NWS Spirit	2–1	Sydney United 58
2023	Sydney United 58 (7)	3–1	APIA Leichhardt
2024	APIA Leichhardt (6)	3–0	Rockdale Ilinden
2025	Sydney United 58 (8)	1–0	Northern Tigers
2026	Sydney United 58 (9)	3–1	APIA Leichhardt

Source: OzFootball.net

== Performance by club ==
All-time honour board
This list includes all Waratah Cup champions and runners-up since the inaugural New South Wales Federation of Soccer Clubs in 1957.

Club	Titles	Years	Runners-up	Years
Sydney United 58	9	1974, 1995, 1996, 2005, 2015, 2016, 2023, 2025, 2026	4	1971, 1976, 2019, 2022
Hakoah Sydney City East	7	1959, 1961, 1963, 1965, 1971, 1976, 2017	1	2018
APIA Leichhardt	6	1962, 1966, 1975, 2013, 2018, 2024	5	2006, 2012, 2017, 2023, 2026
Blacktown City	4	1991, 1993, 2006, 2014	1	2015
Bankstown City	2	1994, 2008	2	1990, 1997
Canterbury Bankstown	2	1957, 1958	4	1960, 1961, 1962, 1995
St George FC	2	1964, 1972	2	1966, 1974
Sutherland Sharks	2	2009, 2012	1	2013
Marconi Stallions	2	2010, 2019	1	1972
Wollongong Wolves	2	1997, 2007	0	
Manly United	1	2011	4	2007, 2009, 2014, 2016
Bonnyrigg White Eagles	1	1992	2	1991, 2004
Canberra FC	1	1990	1	1992
NWS Spirit	1	2022	1	2010
Sydney Crescent Stars	1	2004	0	
Gladesville-Ryde	0		1	1957
Prague	0		2	1958, 1959
South Coast United	0		2	1963, 1964
Sydney Olympic	0		3	1965, 1994, 2008
Western Suburbs	0		1	1975
Parramatta FC	0		1	1996
Belconnen Blue Devils	0		1	2005
Mounties Wanderers	0		1	2011
Northern Tigers	0		1	2025

== Earlier NSW State Cups ==
This table consists of finals of state cup competitions held by the New South Wales Soccer Football Association from 1885.

Competition	Year	Winner	Score	Runners-up
Rainsford Trophy	1885	Granville	3–1	Caledonian
Rainsford Trophy	1886	Granville	2–0	Canterbury
Rainsford Trophy	1887	Hamilton Athletic	4–1	Granville
Gardiner Challenge Cup	1888	Caledonian	4–2	Parkgrove
Gardiner Challenge Cup	1880	Pyrmont Rangers	1–0	Joadji
Gardiner Challenge Cup	1890	Pyrmont Rangers	3–1	Granville
Gardiner Challenge Cup	1891	Parkgrove	4–1	Pyrmont Rangers
Gardiner Challenge Cup	1892	Minmi Rangers	3–0	Pyrmont Rangers
Gardiner Challenge Cup	1893	Pyrmont Rangers	1–0	Minmi Rangers
Gardiner Challenge Cup	1894	Pyrmont Rangers	7–2	Parkgrove
Gardiner Challenge Cup	1895	Balmain	4–2	Pyrmont Rangers
Gardiner Challenge Cup	1896	Balmain	3–1	Pyrmont Rangers
Gardiner Challenge Cup	1897	Balmain	2–1	Pyrmont Rangers
Gardiner Challenge Cup	1898	Pyrmont Volunteers	3–2	Newcastle West
Gardiner Challenge Cup	1899	Pyrmont Rangers	5–2	Balgownie
Gardiner Challenge Cup	1900	West Wallsend	3–3, 4–1 (replay)	Pyrmont Volunteers
Gardiner Challenge Cup	1901	West Wallsend	4–1	Balgownie
Gardiner Challenge Cup	1902	Pyrmont Rovers	3–1	West Wallsend
Gardiner Challenge Cup	1903	Pyrmont Rovers	4–2	Glebe
Gardiner Challenge Cup	1904	Granville	2–1	Glebe
Gardiner Challenge Cup	1905	Balmain	2–2, 2–1 (replay)	Rozelle
Gardiner Challenge Cup	1906	Glebe	3–2	Pyrmont Rovers
Gardiner Challenge Cup	1907	Broadmeadows	0–0, 3–2 (replay)	Pyrmont Rovers
Gardiner Challenge Cup	1908	Pyrmont Rovers	4–0	Glebe
Gardiner Challenge Cup	1909	Adamstown Rosebud	0–0, 3–1 (replay)	Pyrmont Rovers
Gardiner Challenge Cup	1910	HMS Powerful	2–0	Helensburgh
Gardiner Challenge Cup	1911	Balmain	2–1	HMS Powerful
Gardiner Challenge Cup	1912	Balmain	1–0	Sydney
Gardiner Challenge Cup	1913	Annandale	3–0	Newtown
Gardiner Challenge Cup	1914	Granville	3–1	Merewether Advance
Gardiner Challenge Cup	1915	Balmain	2–0	West Wallsend
1916–17 No tournament due to World War I
Gardiner Challenge Cup	1918	Weston	1–0	Balmain Kiora
Gardiner Challenge Cup	1919	Balmain Fernleigh	3–0	West Wallsend
Gardiner Challenge Cup	1920	Balmain Fernleigh	2–0	Granville
Gardiner Challenge Cup	1921	West Wallsend	3–1	Granville
Gardiner Challenge Cup	1922	Granville	1–0	West Wallsend
Gardiner Challenge Cup	1923	West Wallsend	0–0, 0–0 (replay), 4–4 (replay), 1–0 (replay)	Sydney
Gardiner Challenge Cup	1924	West Wallsend	3–0	Woonona
Gardiner Challenge Cup	1925	Adamstown Rosebud	2–0	Cessnock
Gardiner Challenge Cup	1926	West Wallsend	2–1	Adamstown Rosebud
Gardiner Challenge Cup	1927	Gladesville-Ryde	2–0	Granville
Gardiner Challenge Cup	1928	Thirroul Rangers	3–0	Pyrmont
State Cup Series	1928	Aberdare	2–0	Weston
State Cup Series	1929	Cessnock	2–0	Wallsend
State Cup Series	1930	Adamstown Rosebud	2–0	Cessnock
State Cup Series	1931	West Wallsend	3–0	Woonona
State Cup Series	1932	Weston	8–1	Adamstown Rosebud
State Cup Series	1933	St. George	3–3, 5–3 (replay)	Cessnock
State Cup Series	1934	Weston	5–1	Adamstown Rosebud
State Cup Series	1935	Metters	5–0	St. George
State Cup Series	1936	Weston	3–2	Metters
State Cup Series	1937	Wallsend	3–1	Weston
State Cup Series	1938	Metters	4–0	Adamstown Rosebud
State Cup Series	1939	Weston	2–2, 2–1 (replay)	Goodyear
State Cup Series	1940	Metters	4–2	Adamstown Rosebud
State Cup Series	1941	Leichhardt-Annandale	6–3	Granville
State Cup Series	1942	Wallsend	8–1	Gladesville-Ryde
State Cup Series	1943	Merewether	4–2	Woonona-Bulli
State Cup Series	1944	Merewether	6–3	Cessnock
State League Cup	1943	Leichhardt-Annandale	3–2 (a.e.t.)	Adamstown Rosebud
State League Cup	1944	Wallsend	8–2	Gace Brothers
State League Cup	1945	West Wallsend	2–1	Metters
State League Cup	1946	Canterbury-Bankstown	4–1	Adamstown
State League Cup	1947	Corrimal	5–1	Canterbury-Bankstown
State League Cup	1948	Leichhardt-Annandale	4–2	Wallsend
State League Cup	1949	Leichhardt-Annandale	3–0	Granville
State League Cup	1950	Wallsend	5–2	Granville
State League Cup	1951	Granville	3–0	Mayfield United
State League Cup	1952	Wallsend	2–0	West Wallsend
State League Cup	1953	Auburn	1–0	Corrimal
State League Cup	1954	Corrimal Rangers	5–1	Leichhardt-Annandale
State League Cup	1955	Leichhardt Annandale	2–1	Granville
State League Cup	1956	Leichhardt Annandale	6–4	Corrimal Rangers
State League Cup	1957	Wallsend	0–0, 2–0 (replay)	Granville
State League Cup	1958	Toronto-Awaba	4–2	Wallsend

== See also ==
- National Premier Leagues NSW
- NSW League One
- NSW League Two
- Football NSW
