= Leichhardt =

Leichhardt may refer to:

== Places in Australia ==
- Division of Leichhardt, electoral District for the Australian House of Representatives
- Leichhardt Highway, a highway of Queensland, Australia
- Leichhardt Way, an Australian road route
- Leichhardt, New South Wales, inner-western suburb of Sydney, Australia
  - Leichhardt Oval, a football stadium
- Leichhardt, Queensland, a suburb of Ipswich, Queensland
- Municipality of Leichhardt, former local government area of Sydney, Australia

== People ==
- Ludwig Leichhardt (1813–1848), Prussian explorer of Australia

== See also ==
- Electoral district of Leichhardt (disambiguation)
