= 2022 Waratah Cup =

Tournament details
- Country: Australia (NSW)
- Teams: 162

Final positions
- Champions: NWS Spirit

The 2022 Waratah Cup was the 20th season of Football NSW's knockout competition. The preliminary rounds are now a part of the Australia Cup competition. The 4 winners from the Australia Cup preliminary Seventh round qualified for the Waratah Cup.

The Cup was won by NWS Spirit, their first title.

== Format ==
Round	Clubs remaining	Winners from previous round	New entries this round	Main Match Dates
Round 2	162	none	120	6–22 Mar
Round 3	108	66	22	22 Mar–7 Apr
Round 4	64	44	20	13 Apr–12 May
Round 5	32	32	none	11–25 May
Round 6	16	16	none	31 May–1 Jun
Round 7	8	8	none	14–16 Jun
Semi-Finals	4	4	none	28 Jun–6 Jul
Final	2	2	none	7 Aug

== Preliminary rounds ==
New South Wales clubs, other than Northern NSW and A-League clubs, participate in the 2022 Australia Cup via the preliminary rounds. The competition is for all Senior Men's teams of the National Premier Leagues NSW, NSW League One, NSW League Two, NSW League Three, as well as Association teams which applied to participate.

A total of 162 clubs entered into the competition, including 120 grassroots clubs. The four qualifiers were:

Qualifiers
Bonnyrigg White Eagles (3)	NWS Spirit (3)	Sydney United 58 (2)	Wollongong United (6)

== Semi finals ==
28 June 2022
19:30

NWS Spirit (3)	2–0	Wollongong United (6)
Bozanic 29'; Kokubo 87'

Christie Park, Sydney
Referee: Adrian Arndt

6 July 2022
19:00

Bonnyrigg White Eagles (3)	2–3	Sydney United 58 (2)
Peterson 23'; Gauthier 49'	Report	Payne 57' (pen.), 69'; Roberts 79'

Valentine Sports Park, Sydney
Attendance: 0 (Note: Match played behind closed doors.)
Referee: Kurt Ams

== Grand final ==
7 August 2022
13:00

NWS Spirit (3)	2–1	Sydney United 58 (2)
	Source

Blacktown City Football Centre, Sydney
