= Electoral district of Leichhardt =

Electoral district of Leichhardt may refer to:

- Division of Leichhardt, an electorate of the Australian House of Representatives, based in far north Queensland
- Electoral district of Leichhardt (New South Wales), a former electorate of the New South Wales Legislative Assembly based in inner west Sydney
- Electoral district of Leichhardt (Queensland), a former electorate of the Queensland Legislative Assembly, based in central Queensland
- Electoral district of Leichhardt, Queensland (New South Wales), a former electorate of the New South Wales Legislative Assembly, based in central Queensland, prior to Queensland becoming a separate colony in December 1859

== See also ==
- Electoral district of Moreton, Wide Bay, Burnett, Maranoa, Leichhardt and Port Curtis
