= Ron Kearns =

New Zealand footballer

Personal information
- Full name: Ronald C Kearns
- Place of birth: Wellington, New Zealand
- Position: Defender

Senior career*
Years	Team	Apps	(Gls)
1958–1959	Seatoun		
1960–1965	Hakoah		

International career
1958	New Zealand	4	(0)
- * Club domestic league appearances and goals

Ronald Kearns (born in New Zealand) is a former association football player who represented New Zealand at international level.

Kearns played domestic football in New Zealand for Seatoun, winning back to back Chatham Cups in 1957 and 1958, before moving to Australia to play with Sydney Hakoah in 1960.

Kearns made his full New Zealand debut in a 2–2 draw with Australia on 23 August 1958 and ended his international playing career with four official A-international caps to his credit, his final appearance in a 2–1 win over New Caledonia on 14 September 1958.
