= Camden Tigers FC =

Camden Tigers
- Full name: Camden Tigers FC
- Nickname: The Tigers
- Founded: 1961
- Ground: Ron Dine Reserve, Camden, New South Wales
- Coach: Justin Mickan
- League: NSW League Two
- 2025: 14th of 15
- Website: http://www.camdentigers.com.au/about-us/

Camden Tigers, is a semi-professional soccer club, based and located in the Camden area of New South Wales. In season 2020, they are set to compete in the NSW League Two (formerly NSW NPL 3 competition).

== Club Info ==
Camden Tigers is the only Club in the Macarthur area that has a player development structure that allows talented players to progress through the junior ranks and into representative football.

Camden achieved promotion from NSW State League in 2017 despite finishing 2nd on the table behind Bankstown United. The club was promoted based on Club Championship points which takes into account results from 18s, 20s and 1st grade.

The Club narrowly missed out on securing a spot in NPL NSW 3 after the 2020 league shake up, instead the will compete in NPL NSW 4 for the 2020 season with the aim of acquiring promotion.

== Youth Structure ==
Camden Tigers have a youth setup competing in the NPL NSW 3. Finishing 2nd in the youth club championship in 2019 they will be looking to improve in that result promoting youth to NPL 1 in the upcoming seasons.

== Club colours ==
The club's colours are orange and black.

== Honours ==
- 2017 State League Winners.
