= 2015 Waratah Cup =

Tournament details
- Country: Australia (NSW)
- Teams: 5

Final positions
- Champions: Sydney United 58
- Runners-up: Blacktown City

Tournament statistics
- Matches played: 4
- Goals scored: 10 (2.5 per match)
- Top goal scorer: Chris Triantis (3 goals)

The 2015 Waratah Cup was the 13th season of Football NSW's knockout competition, and which ran from 3 June to 5 July. The Preliminary rounds are now a part of the 2015 FFA Cup competition. The 5 winners from the FFA Cup preliminary Seventh Round qualified both for the Waratah Cup and for the 2015 FFA Cup Round of 32.

The winners were Sydney United 58, their 5th title (including predecessor knockout cup competitions).

== Preliminary rounds ==
New South Wales clubs, other than Northern NSW and A-League clubs, participated in the 2015 FFA Cup via the preliminary rounds. The competition was for all Senior Men's teams of the National Premier Leagues NSW, NPL Division 2, State League Division 1, State League Division 2, as well as Association teams which applied to participate.

A total of 104 clubs entered into the competition, and the five qualifiers for the final rounds were:

Qualifiers
Balmain Tigers (4)	Blacktown City (2)	Rockdale City Suns (2)	Sydney Olympic (2)	Sydney United 58 (2)

== Playoff round ==
Two of the qualifiers played off to reduce the remaining teams to 4 for the Semi-finals.

3 June 2015
19:15

Sydney Olympic	1–0	Balmain Tigers
M. Gaitatzis 89'

Belmore Sports Ground, Sydney

== Semi-finals ==
A total of 4 teams took part in this stage of the competition.

17 June 2015

Sydney United 58	3–2	Rockdale City Suns
Triantis 18', 69'; Paric 78'	Report	Ješić 24', 40'

Sydney
Referee: Stephen Lucas

17 June 2015

Sydney Olympic	1–2 (a.e.t.)	Blacktown City
H. Gaitatzis 30'	Report	Major 9'; Evans 95'

Belmore Sports Ground, Sydney

== Grand final ==
The 2015 Waratah Cup Grand Final was played on 5 July 2015 at Valentine Sports Park.

5 July 2015

Sydney United 58	1–0	Blacktown City
Triantis 85'	Report

Valentine Sports Park, Sydney
Referee: Kurt Ams
