= Adrian Ucchino =

Australian soccer player

Personal information
- Full name: Adrian Luke Ucchino
- Date of birth: 4 October 1991 (age 35)
- Place of birth: Sydney, Australia
- Height: 1.78 m (5 ft 10 in)
- Position: Midfielder

Team information
- Current team: APIA Leichhardt Tigers
- Number: 18

Youth career
- Blacktown City Demons
- 2007–2010: Frosinone

Senior career*
Years	Team	Apps	(Gls)
2010–2012	Frosinone	2	(0)
2011	→ Sangiovannese (loan)	5	(0)
2012–2014	Bonnyrigg White Eagles	66	(7)
2015–	APIA Leichhardt Tigers	225	(10)
- * Club domestic league appearances and goals as of 23 January 2025

Adrian Ucchino (born 4 October 1991) is an Australian soccer player who currently plays as a midfielder for APIA Leichhardt Tigers in the NSW NPL Men's 1.

== Club career ==
Ucchino was introduced to soccer by his childhood friend, taught him how to dribble, shoot and how to handle the ball. Ucchino was a fast learner and earned a reputation for his skill and ball handling.

On 27 October 2010, Ucchino made his debut for Frosinone against Reggina in the Coppa Italia.

In January 2011, Ucchino joined Sangiovannese on loan for the rest of the season.

In May 2012 Ucchino made his debut for New South Wales Premier League side Bonnyrigg White Eagles as a half-time substitute.

In 2015 Ucchino moved to rival NSW NPL Men's 1 rivals APIA Leichhardt Tigers FC.

Ucchino scored the winning goal in the 2019 NPL NSW Grand Final for Apia, to defeat Sydney United.
