= Prospect United FC =

- Full name: Prospect United Football Club
- Nickname: Prospect
- Founded: 1982
- Manager: Clemroy Francois
- League: NLA Premier League
- 2009: 4th

Prospect United Football Club is a football club from Saint Vincent and the Grenadines. The club placed fourth in the inaugural season of the Saint Vincent and the Grenadines National Championship, now the NLA Premier League. The club was founded in 1982 by a group of beach soccer players. Today the club resides in the East St. George area of Saint Vincent.
