= APIA Leichhardt FC =

Soccer club based in Sydney, New South Wales

- Nicknames: Tigers; I Marronazzuri (The Blue and Browns)
- Founded: 1954 (72 years ago)
- Ground: Lambert Park; Leichhardt, New South Wales; Leichhardt Oval; Lilyfield, New South Wales
- President: Mario Raciti
- Coach: Franco Parisi (men's)
- League: NPL NSW (men's)
- 2026: 1st of 16 (premiers)
- Website: apialeichhardt.football
Home colours	Away colours

APIA Leichhardt FC (/ɑːpiə laɪkɑːrt/ AH-pee-ə lye-KART), also known simply as APIA (Italian: Associazione Poli-sportiva Italo Australiana, lit. 'Italian Australian Multisport Association'), is a semi-professional soccer club based in the suburb of Leichhardt in Sydney, New South Wales (NSW). Its senior men's and women's teams play in the National Premier Leagues NSW (NPL) and NSW Women's, in the second tier of the Australian league system. It plays its home games at both Lambert Park and Leichhardt Oval. With Wests Ashfield, the club also co-owns Wests APIA FC, a foundation club in the Australian Championship.

Founded in 1954 by the Italian Australian community in Sydney's Inner West, APIA was one of the charter members of Football NSW, and competed in its first division, where it won four NSW titles. On the national stage, the club appeared in four straight Australia Cup finals from 1964 to 1967, winning one, and subsequently joined the burgeoning National Soccer League (NSL) in 1979. It played fourteen seasons in the league, during which it won a championship, and two NSL Cups. Facing financial troubles, APIA exited following the 1991–92 season, and returned to NSW's first division, where it has remained since. Its women's team suffered a relegation in 2013, though eventually regained promotion to the first division in 2020.

APIA's honours include seven NSW men's titles, one women's title, six Waratah Cups, and two Sapphire Cups. Its best performances in the modern-day Australia Cup are quarter-final appearances in 2018 and 2021. It also reached the NPL's national semi-finals in 2017.

== History ==
Chart of yearly table positions for APIA Leichhardt in NSL

The club was founded as the Associazione Poli-sportiva Italo Australiana ("APIA") in 1954 by members of the Italian-Australian community in Sydney's Inner West. After several years in the Canterbury District competition, the club joined the NSW Federation's state league.

In the 1960s APIA became one of the foremost soccer clubs in Australia and won the Premiership of NSW of the years 1964, 1966, 1967 and 1975, which was the highest level of achievement in the absence of a national competition. Between 1966 and 1974 APIA also won three times the State Cup of NSW, then named after a sponsor Ampol Cup. The 1974 final was considered "one of the most incredible finals" of the history of the club when skipper Jimmy Rooney and centreforward Peter Ollerton, who scored five goals, won 9–1 against Auburn in front of a crowd of 5210 at Wentworth Park, the highest finals result ever.

Rooney and Ollerton were also in the team that represented Australia a few months later in its first World Cup participation in Germany.

In 1979 APIA was given access to the National Soccer League, the top tier of Australian soccer since 1977. In 1987 APIA won the national championship, six points ahead of the Preston Makedonia Soccer Club from Melbourne, with then only two points awarded per win. The coach in that season was Rale Rasic. Charlie Yankos and Peter Katholos are probably the best known players from that side. The main cast of that year consisted of Tony Pezzano; Charlie Yankos, Arno Bertogna, Mark Brown, Jean-Paul de Marigny, Peter Tredinnick, Peter Katholos, Edward Lorens, Hilton Phillips, Gary Ward, Rod Brown and Tony Parison. In 1988 APIA won the National Soccer League Cup. By 1992 the APIA Leichhardt was overwhelmed by financial difficulties. The club was somewhat restructured and forthwith played on state level with the moniker "Tigers."

In 2017, APIA won the National Premier Leagues NSW premiership, but lost the grand final to Manly United FC on penalties. APIA also made the grand final of the 2017 Waratah Cup, but lost 3–1 to Hakoah Sydney City East FC.

In 2018, APIA won the 2018 Waratah Cup. On 21 August 2018, APIA defeated reigning A-League champions Melbourne Victory FC in the Round of 16 of the 2018 FFA Cup, becoming the seventh state-league side to beat a top-tier team in the knockout tournament. The result was billed as one of the biggest upsets in the tournament's history.

APIA won the National Premier Leagues NSW Grand Final with a 2–1 victory over Sydney United in 2019. This was the first final ever played at Bankwest Stadium.

When the Football Federation Australia repealed its controversial National Club Identification Policy, which effectively banned clubs from having ethnic identities APIA dropped the "Tigers" moniker and reverted to its original badge.

The club was announced on 20 November 2023, as one of the eight foundation teams for the Australian Championship, due to start October 2025. They will continue to play in the NPL NSW for the 2024 & 2025 season, before transitioning to the new league.

== Venues ==
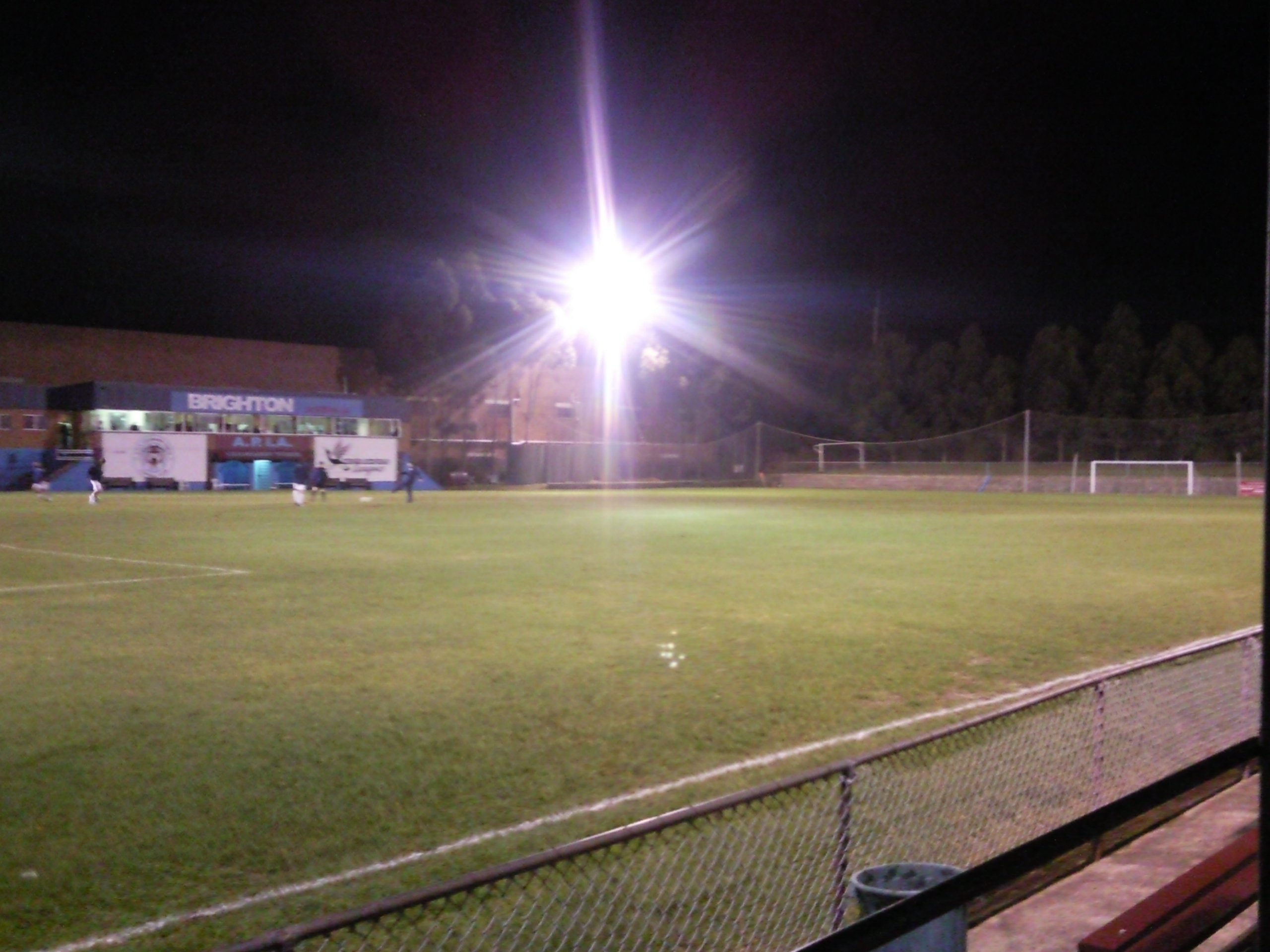
Lambert Park under floodlights with the old turf surface

Lambert Park in Leichhardt is the club's traditional home ground. It was opened in 1954 and has, over the years, been used for most of the club's home games. It is still APIA's main ground and hosts all of the club's NPL matches. APIA has also hosted home games at a number of other venues, including Wentworth Park, Henson Park and, most notably, Leichhardt Oval, where Australia Cup ties against high-profile teams have typically been hosted.

== Current squad ==
Updated 8 April, 2026. Note: Flags indicate national team as defined under FIFA eligibility rules; some limited exceptions apply. Players may hold more than one non-FIFA nationality.

No.	Pos.	Nation	Player
1	GK	AUS	Oliver Kalac
2	MF	JPN	Seiya Kambayashi
3	MF	AUS	Navid Alizada
4	DF	JPN	Eijin Kishimoto
7	FW	AUS	Jack Stewart
8	MF	AUS	Michael Konestabo
9	FW	AUS	Presley Ortiz
11	FW	AUS	Rory Jordan
12	MF	ITA	Antonio Rizzo
14	MF	AUS	Max Court
15	DF	AUS	Themba Muata-Marlow
16	DF	AUS	Sean Symons

No.	Pos.	Nation	Player
17	FW	AUS	Jordan Segreto
18	MF	AUS	Adrian Ucchino
19	MF	AUS	Fabian Monge
20	GK	AUS	Alex Parkes
21	DF	AUS	Michael Kouta
22	MF	AUS	Eddie Caspers
23	MF	AUS	Levi Sciuriaga
24	DF	AUS	Cameron Fong
28	DF	AUS	Kyle Shaw
29	MF	AUS	Oscar Gonzalez
30	FW	AUS	Alex Denmead
38	MF	AUS	Cristian Lombardo
99	MF	AUS	Franco Farinella

== Seasons ==
Key to league competitions

- Div. 1 = Division One
- NSL = National Soccer League
- AC = Australian Championship
- NSWSL = NSW Super League
- NSWPL = NSW Premier League
- NPL NSW = National Premier Leagues NSW
- ^{P} Draws went to penalty shoot-outs during the 1993–1995 seasons (2 points for win, 1 point for loss).
- ^{1} Stage 1 of 1996 NSW Super League
- ^{2} Stage 1 of 1996 NSW Super League

Key to position colours and symbols

1st or W	Winners
2nd or RU	Runners-up
3rd	Third
♦	Top scorer in division

Key to cup competitions

- AMP = Ampol Cup
- NPLF = National Premier Leagues Finals

Key to cup and finals results

- 1R, 2R, 3R...7R = 1st Round, 2nd Round, 3rd Round...7th Round
- GS = Group Stage
- EF = Elimination Final
- PF = Preliminary Final
- PO = Playoff Final
- R32 = Round of 32
- R16 = Round of 16
- QF = Quarterfinals
- SF = Semifinals
- RU = Runners-Up
- W = Winners
- Unk = Result unknown

Season	League										Waratah Cup	Australia Cup (Note: FFA Cup/Australia Cup (from 2014). Includes Australia Cup (1962–1968) and NSL Cup (1977–1997))	Other	Top scorer	
Season	Div	P	W	D	L	F	A	Pts	Pos	Finals	Waratah Cup	Australia Cup	Other	Player(s)	Goals
1957	Div. 1	20	3	4	13	39	57	10	9th	–	QF		2R^{AMP}		
1958	Div. 1	22	7	4	11	41	41	18	8th	–					
1959	Div. 1	26	19	4	3	72	33	42	2nd	RU					
1960	Div. 1	26	18	5	3	71	25	41	2nd	SF					
1961	Div. 1	22	10	4	8	55	43	24	6th	–	–				
1962	Div. 1	22	13	3	6	65	38	29	3rd	SF	W	QF			
1963	Div. 1	22	14	3	5	70	37	31	2nd	RU		QF			
1964	Div. 1	22	14	3	5	59	35	31	1st	W		RU		John Watkiss	24
1965	Div. 1	18	11	0	7	51	28	22	3rd	W		RU		John Giacometti	21
1966	Div. 1	18	13	4	1	55	16	30	1st	RU	W	W	W^{AMP}	John Giacometti	20
1967	Div. 1	22	17	3	2	65	19	37	1st	RU		RU		John Giacometti	22
1968	Div. 1	22	11	4	7	42	25	29	3rd	GS		R16			
1969	Div. 1	22	9	8	5	35	26	26	4th	W			3rd^{AMP}		
1970	Div. 1	22	9	1	12	36	35	19	7th	–			W^{AMP}		
1971	Div. 1	22	6	5	11	25	40	17	8th	–			4th^{AMP}		
1972	Div. 1	22	11	8	3	33	18	30	3rd	SF			Unk^{AMP}		
1973	Div. 1	22	10	6	6	38	34	26	5th	–					
1974	Div. 1	22	12	4	6	44	25	28	2nd	PF			W^{AMP}	Paul Ollerton	18
1975	Div. 1	22	13	5	4	39	19	31	1st	RU	W			Paul Ollerton	17
1976	Div. 1	22	15	5	2	49	17	35	2nd	W					
1977	Div. 1	22	15	6	1	46	15	36	2nd	PF					
1978	Div. 1	26	13	3	10	36	4	29	6th	–		1R			
1979	NSL	26	11	3	12	29	37	25	8th	N/A		R16		Ken Reed	7
1980	NSL	26	8	7	11	27	35	23	8th	N/A		R16		Phil O’Connor	10
1981	NSL	30	12	11	7	39	33	35	4th	N/A		QF		Marshall Soper	12
1982	NSL	30	12	7	11	49	54	31	7th	N/A		W		Marshall Soper	14
1983	NSL	30	11	6	13	42	36	39	8th	N/A		R16		John Bradley	12
1984	NSL/NC (Note: During 1984 to 1986, the league was split into two conferences – APIA played in the Northern Conference and the position in the table reflects position in the conference.)	28	12	8	8	43	35	32	4th	PF		SF		Peter Katholos	14
1985	NSL/NC	22	7	2	13	20	34	16	9th	–		R16		Peter Katholos	14
1986	NSL/NC	22	9	6	7	25	23	24	7th	–		R32		Terry Butler	4
1987	NSL	24	13	9	2	39	21	35	1st	W		R16		Rod Brown	14
1988	NSL	26	8	7	11	28	35	23	11th	–		W		Hilton Phillips	8
1989	NSL	26	7	9	10	27	35	23	10th	–		SF		Rod Brown	7
1989–90	NSL	26	11	9	6	36	25	31	6th	–		SF		Rod Brown	10
1990–91	NSL	26	7	7	12	27	28	21	11th	–		SF		Alex Bundalo	6
1991–92	NSL	26	7	11	8	26	28	25	8th	–		R16		John Gibson	8
1993	NSWSL^{P}	26	10	6+2	8	39	23	44	6th	–					
1994	NSWSL^{P}	22	7	3+7	5	20	19	34	8th	–					
1995	NSWSL^{P}	26	10	4+5	7	29	23	43	4th	–					
1996	NSWSL^{1}	13	7	3	3	20	14	24	3rd	–					
1996	NSWSL^{2}	13	4	5	4	19	22	17	8th	–					
1997	NSWSL	20	12	3	5	27	17	39	2nd	PF				John Buonavoglia	6
1998	NSWSL	21	8	6	7	32	32	30	8th	–				John Buonavoglia	11
1999	NSWSL	22	11	2	9	43	37	35	7th	–				Steve Karavatakis	10
2000	NSWSL	26	14	6	6	53	39	48	3rd	PF				Steve Karavatakis	14
2000–01	NSWPL	18	8	2	8	41	36	26	5th	–				Steve Karavatakis	16
2001–02	NSWPL	22	12	5	5	40	29	41	4th	EF				Steve Karavatakis	12
2002–03	NSWPL	22	11	7	4	44	25	40	2nd	W	Not held			Zlatko Arambasic	17
2003–04	NSWPL	22	7	3	12	24	36	24	9th	–	SF			Norman Tome	6
2004–05	NSWPL	22	9	4	9	25	29	31	6th	–	SF			Norman Tome	4
2006	NSWPL	18	3	4	11	16	38	13	10th	–	RU			Shane McGirr	3
2007	NSWPL	18	8	4	6	26	23	28	5th	–	4R			Robert Younis	9
2008	NSWPL	22	9	7	6	41	35	34	6th	–	QF			Robert Younis	21
2009	NSWPL	22	5	7	10	30	38	22	11th	–	4R			Robert Younis	11
2010	NSWPL	22	13	3	7	39	37	39	3rd	SF	4R			Robert Younis	14
2011	NSWPL	22	6	5	11	24	36	23	10th	—	QF			Robert Younis	5
2012	NSWPL	22	9	4	9	32	31	31	6th	—	RU			Andy Bevin	7
2013	NPL NSW	22	2	8	12	29	48	14	11th	—	W			Nikola Taneski	7
2014	NPL NSW	22	4	8	10	31	51	20	11th	–	4R	DNQ		Blake Powell	9
2015	NPL NSW	22	13	6	3	56	31	45	2nd	PF	4R	DNQ		Blake Powell	21
2016	NPL NSW	22	7	5	11	39	41	26	8th	–	6R	DNQ		Tasuku Sekiya	11
2017	NPL NSW	22	16	1	5	50	18	49	1st	RU	RU	R16	SF^{NPLF}	Jordan Murray	12
2018	NPL NSW	22	14	3	5	62	28	45	2nd	RU	W	QF		Jordan Murray	24
2019	NPL NSW	22	12	6	4	42	28	42	2nd	W	6R	DNQ		Chris Payne	22
2020	NPL NSW	11	2	1	8	12	27	7	12th	—	Not held	Not held		Sean Symons	4
2021	NPL NSW	17	6	3	8	20	21	21	season cancelled			QF		Franco Parisi	5
2022	NPL NSW	22	10	5	7	41	33	35	5th	SF	4R	DNQ		Jason Romero	11
2023	NPL NSW	30	20	5	5	64	35	65	1st	Not held	RU	R16		J. Armson - J. Stewart -	14
2024	NPL NSW	30	18	3	9	78	48	57	3rd	SF	W	R32		Ben Gibson	18
2025	NPL NSW	30	20	4	6	75	35	55	2nd	W	SF	R16		Presley Ortiz	15
2025	AC	6	4	1	1	12	4	13	1st	QF	-	-	-	Dredon Kelly	3
2026	NPL NSW	30	21	5	4	66	35	68	1st	RU	RU	QF		Presley Ortiz	21
2026	AC														

Correct as of 14th October 2026

Source OzFootball

- APIA Leichhardt FC Women's

Season	League										Sapphire Cup	Top scorer	
Season	Div	P	W	D	L	F	A	Pts	Pos	Finals	Sapphire Cup	Player(s)	Goals
2025	NPL1 NSW Women	26	15	4	7	52	32	49	2nd	RU	W	Ash Crofts	20
2024	NPL1 NSW Women	26	15	6	5	55	37	51	2nd	RU	QF	Ash Crofts	16
2023	NPL1 NSW Women	26	19	5	2	64	26	62	1st	PF	W	Ash Crofts	24
2022	NPL1 NSW Women	22	12	4	6	48	25	40	2nd	PF	-	Shea Connors	16
2021	NPL1 NSW Women	12	6	4	2	23	16	22	4th	PF	-	Lisa Devanna	5
2020	NPL1 NSW Women	11	5	2	4	20	17	17	8th	-	-	Georia Yeoman-Dale	5
2019	NPL2 NSW Women	22	17	4	1	105	17	55	1st	RU	-	Ash Palombi	33
2018	NPL2 NSW Women	22	13	4	5	59	33	43	4th	SF	-	Ash Palombi	17
2017	NSW State League Women	18	14	3	1	83	14	45	1st	RU	-		
2016	NSW State League Women	21	14	3	4	56	17	45	1st	RU	-		
2015	NSW State League Women	21	8	2	11	31	49	26	6th	-	-		
2014	NSW State League Women	20	2	0	18	25	92	6	7th	-	-		
2013	NSW State League Women	22	3	4	15	21	70	13	11th	-	-		
2012	NSW Women’s Super League	18	2	3	13	23	55	9	7th	-	-		
2011	NSW Women’s Super League	18	16	0	2	69	14	48	1st	W	-		
2010	NSW Women’s Super League	16	8	5	3	39	22	29	4th	RU	-		

Correct as of 10th August 2025

== Honours ==
=== Regional ===
- National Premier Leagues NSW
  - Premiers (7): 1964, 1966, 1967, 1975, 2017, 2023, 2026
  - Runners-Up (11): 1959, 1960, 1963, 1974, 1976, 1977, 1997, 2002–03, 2015, 2018, 2019, 2025
- National Premier Leagues NSW Grand Finals
  - Championships (7): 1964, 1965, 1969, 1976, 2002–03, 2019, 2025
  - Runners-Up (8): 1959, 1963, 1966, 1967, 1975, 2017, 2018, 2026
- Waratah Cup
  - Winners (6): 1962, 1966, 1975, 2013, 2018, 2024
  - Runners-Up (5): 2006, 2012, 2017, 2023, 2026
- Johnny Warren Cup
  - Winners (1): 2007
- Ampol Cup
  - Winners (3): 1966, 1970, 1974

=== National ===
- National Soccer League
  - Champions (1): 1987
  - Premiers (1): 1987 National Soccer League
- Australia Cup
  - Winners (1): 1966
  - Runners-Up (3): 1964, 1965, 1967
- NSL Cup
  - Winners (2): 1982, 1988

== Individual honours ==
=== National ===
- National Soccer League Coach of the Year (1)
  - Rale Rasic - 1987
- Australian Championship MVP (1)
  - Dredon Kelly

=== Regional ===
- NPL NSW Premier League Player of the year (5)
  - George Blues - 1970
  - Terry Butler - 1978
  - Franco Parisi - 2015
  - Sean Symons - 2017
  - Tasuku Sekiya - 2018
- NPL NSW Premier League Coach of the Year (4)
  - Franco Parisi - 2026
  - Franco Parisi - 2025
  - Franco Parisi - 2023
  - Danial Cummins - 2017
- Robbie Slater Award (2)
  - Michael Kouta - 2025
  - Sean Symons - 2019
- NPL NSW Premier Leagues Golden Boot (10)
  - Presley Ortiz (21) - 2026
  - Jordan Murray (23) - 2018
  - Blake Powell (21) - 2015
  - Robert Younis (21) - 2008
  - Paul Ollerton (17) - 1975
  - Paul Ollerton (18) - 1974
  - John Giacometti (22) - 1967
  - John Giacometti (20) - 1966
  - John Giacometti (21) - 1965
  - John Watkiss (24) - 1964
- NPL NSW Goalkeeper of the Year (2)
  - Matthew Nash - 2008
  - Ivan Necevski - 2023
  - Anthony Bouzanis - 2024
- NPL NSW Goal of the Year (2)
  - Adrian Ucchino - 2025
  - Blake Powell - 2015

== Notes ==
Preceded by Adelaide City	NSL Champions; 1987	Succeeded by Marconi Stallions
