= Bankstown United =

Bankstown United Football Club
- Full name: Bankstown United
- Nickname: United
- Founded: 2016
- Ground: Padstow Park, Padstow
- Manager: Sasha Tirovski
- League: NSW League Two
- 2026: 14th of 15
- Website: http://www.bdafa.com.au/bankstown-united-fc/

Bankstown United, is a semi-professional soccer club, based and located in the Bankstown area of New South Wales. In season 2019, they are set to compete in the NSW League Two competition.

Bankstown United is the representative side of the Bankstown District Amateur Football Association.

== Senior Team History ==
In 2016 Bankstown United finished 4th out of 12 teams with 11 wins, 5 draws and 6 losses. They lost their elimination final to Camden Tigers 2–4.

In 2017 the club improved on their result in 2016 finishing as Premiers with 14 wins and 4 losses. However they would miss out on promotion due to the Club Championship standings and go on to lose the grand final 4–2 in extra time to the team that knocked them out in 2016, Camden Tigers.

In 2018 the club found the result they were looking for. After a hard season battling hard with Central Coast United for the premiership and promotion, a win in round 20 sent the side to the top of the table with 2 games remaining. They would go on to seal promotion however the grand final win would elude them once again, going down 2–0 to their Central Coast foes.

In 2022 the club will play in the NPl 2 Mens competition FNSW also announced the structure of the 2022 season which saw BUFC elevated into NPL 2 Youth (youth structure in season 2022 is 3 divisions of 16 team competitions).

In 2025, the club got relegated to NPL 3 youth.

== Club colours ==
The club colours are green and yellow.

== Honours ==
- NSW State League Premiers 2017, 2018
