= Western City Rangers FC =

Soccer club based in Sydney, New South Wales

- Founded: 1970 (56 years ago)
- Ground: Popondetta Park; Emerton, New South Wales
- Capacity: 4,000
- Coach: Warren Grieve
- League: FNSW League One
- 2026: NPL NSW, 16th of 16 (relegated)
- Website: mdtrangers.com.au
Home colours

Western City Rangers FC, formerly known as Mount Druitt Town Rangers FC, are a semi-professional soccer club based in the suburb of Emerton in Greater Western Sydney, New South Wales. Incorporated in 1970, its senior men's team competes in Football NSW League One, in the third tier of the Australian league system, and its senior women's team competes in the National Premier Leagues NSW Women's, in the second tier.

== History ==
The Mt Druitt Town Rangers Soccer Club was incorporated in 1970 and has developed a strong association with the district and the states governing body, Football NSW.

Since 1970, the Rangers has provided football opportunities for the youth of Western Sydney. Founded by two Scots of opposing religions and the fiercest of football rivalries, they overcame their differences to unite the green of Celtic, the Rangers name, and the gold of Australia - their new home.

Sadie and Jackie Wilson (Celtic) and Joseph Martin (Rangers) kicked it off in the late 1960s. Jackie somewhat reluctant at first ended up door knocking the local streets where many Scottish expats had settled, quickly the club gathered a strong base that built the foundations of the club we have today. Over the years many cultural backgrounds have been welcomed to Popondetta irrespective of their race, colour or creed. In 2012 Rangers first entered the FNSW Girls program.

The Rangers play in the FFA FNSW National Premier League (NPL) 1st Grade, 20s, FNSW Boys' Youth League Two u18s, u16s, 15s, 14s, 13s, Skills Acquisition League u12s, 11s, 10s, 9s and Women's NPL 1, Res and FNSW League Two Girl's 16g, 15g, 14g. MDTRFC also have an Inclusive /Special Needs/ AWD program. Town Rangers also offers community football opportunities in the local Blacktown District Soccer Football Association.

The Rangers regularly feature in the Portuguese International Tournament hosted by Vila Franca do Rosario. Over the years VFR has included some of the superpowers of European football's youth academies such as regulars Sporting Club Portugal, SL Benfica, Porto FC, as well as other international guests Sheffield Wednesday, Real Betis, Malaga, Dynamo Moscow. In 2017, the Skills Acquisition Program also toured Portugal and played in the Algarve New World Youth Cup, where the Rangers team was awarded the Fair Play Award. That same year, the Rangers made the National Premier League 2 1st grade grand final against the league winners.

In 2024, Blacktown City Council completed a major upgrade to the Popondetta Park precinct of $5 million development of a synthetic field and additional amenities for players and spectators.

In December 2025, Mt Druitt Town Rangers rebranded to Western City Rangers. The rebrand was done to broaden their reach and represent the greater Western Sydney area. Popondetta park will also get lighting upgrades, and the clubhouse will be refurbished.

== Club colours and kit ==
The club's home kit is based on the Australian national jersey/shirt is predominantly gold and shorts bottle green (the green is from celtic, the gold is for Australia), the socks are gold. The away kit is shirt bottle green, shorts black, and socks black.

== Current squad ==
As of 18 February 2026

Note: Flags indicate national team as defined under FIFA eligibility rules; some limited exceptions apply. Players may hold more than one non-FIFA nationality.

No.	Pos.	Nation	Player
1	GK	TLS	Dylan Niski
2	DF	AUS	Marcelo Martellotta
4	DF	AUS	Paolo Bonanni
5	DF	AUS	Ryan Devine
6	MF	AUS	Rocco Fragale
7	FW	AUS	Shayden Sampow
8	MF	AUS	Jordan Gomez
9	FW	AUS	Hugo Cornish
10	MF	AUS	Thomas Lopez
11	MF	AUS	Kye Hickman

No.	Pos.	Nation	Player
12	MF	AUS	Rocco Pelle
13	GK	AUS	Isaac Farrugia
16	MF	AUS	Charlie Daniels
17	FW	AUS	Cooper Coskerie
18	DF	AUS	Jared Macerola
19	FW	AUS	Dimo Dimo
25	DF	AUS	Ryley D’Sena
27	DF	PHI	Shayden Sampow
97	MF	AUS	Jamal Belkadi

== Honours ==
- 2024 Men's League One (Formally NSW NPL2) - Winners
- 2024 Women's League One - Club Champions
- 2018 National Premier Leagues NPL2 - Winners
- 2018 NPL2 Senior Club Champions
- 2015 NPL2 Youth Club Champions
- 2014 Boys Youth Club Champions
- 2013 Boys Youth Club Champions
- 1993 Men's Division One (Pre-NPL2) Premier
