= List of football clubs in Saint Vincent and the Grenadines =

This is a list of football (soccer) clubs in Saint Vincent and the Grenadines.

  - Avenues United FC
  - Bequia United FC
  - Brownstown United F.C.
  - Camdonia Chelsea SC
  - DESCO
  - JeBelle FC
  - Fitz Hughes Predators
  - Glenside Ball Blazers
  - Green Hill FC
  - Greiggs FC
  - 1998 Hillside
  - Hill View SCEC
  - Hope International FC
  - JG & Sons Stingers FC
  - K&R Strikers
  - Largo Height FC
  - Owia United
  - Parkside Rollers
  - Pastures FC
  - Pride & Joy FC
  - Prospect United FC
  - QCESCO Titans
  - Richmond Hill United
  - Rocksdale FC
  - Roseans FC
  - RSVGPF FC
  - Sharpes FC 09
  - Sharpes United FC
  - Sion Hill FC
  - Sparta FC
  - Strike Force FC
  - Stubborn Youth SC
  - SV United FC
  - System 3 FC
  - Toni Store Jugglers FC
  - United Strikers FC
  - Universal Mufflers Samba_
  - Volcanoes FC
  - Zodiac FC

_ = does not exist anymore
