= 2016 SVGFF Premier Division =

SVGFF Premier Division
- Season: 2015–16
- Champions: System 3
- CFU Club Championship: System 3

The 2016 SVGFF Premier Division is the sixth season of top-tier football in Saint Vincent and the Grenadines under its current format, and it is also the 11th season of top flight football altogether. The defending champions are Hope International, who won the title in 2014 (no competition was held in 2015).

== Clubs ==
- Avenues United (Kingstown)
- Bequia United
- BESCO Pastures
- Camdonia Chelsea
- Dove
- Greggs
- Hope International
- Je Belle
- Parkside Rollers
- Prospect United
- Sion Hill
- SV United
- System 3
- Toni Store Jugglers

== Table ==
Pos	Team	Pld	W	D	L	GF	GA	GD	Pts	Qualification or relegation
1	Hope International	7	7	0	0	17	6	+11	21	Championship group
2	Sion Hill	8	5	2	1	28	13	+15	17	Championship group
3	System 3	7	5	2	0	19	8	+11	17	Championship group
4	Bequia United	7	5	1	1	18	10	+8	16	Championship group
5	Je Belle	8	4	1	3	12	13	−1	13	Championship group
6	Avenues United	7	3	3	1	16	12	+4	12	Championship group
7	Camdonia Chelsea	7	4	0	3	12	11	+1	12	Championship group
8	SV United	7	2	2	3	11	12	−1	8	Championship group
9	Pastures United	7	2	1	4	13	13	0	7	Relegation group
10	Toni Store Jugglers	8	2	1	5	10	16	−6	7	Relegation group
11	Greggs	7	2	1	4	12	20	−8	7	Relegation group
12	Prospect United	7	2	0	5	8	13	−5	6	Relegation group
13	Parkside Rollers	8	0	2	6	10	18	−8	2	Relegation group
14	Dove	7	0	0	7	5	26	−21	0	Relegation group

Updated to match(es) played on 6 Mar 2016.
Source: https://www.rsssf.org/tabless/stvin2016.html
