= 2018–19 SVGFF Premier Division =

SVGFF Premier Division
- Season: 2018–19
- Champions: Pastures FC

The 2018–19 SVGFF Premier Division is the seventh season of the SVGFF Premier Division, the top-tier football in Saint Vincent and the Grenadines under its current format, and it is also the 12th season of top flight football altogether. The season started on 13 October 2018. Many league games took place in front of dozens of spectators.

== League table ==
Pos	Team	Pld	W	D	L	GF	GA	GD	Pts	Qualification or relegation
1	BESCO Pastures (C)	22	16	5	1	66	24	+42	53	Caribbean Club Shield
2	North Leeward Predators	22	14	6	2	43	17	+26	48	
3	Sion Hill	22	9	8	5	41	32	+9	35	
4	Hope International	22	10	3	9	45	41	+4	33	
5	System 3	22	10	3	9	48	46	+2	33	
6	SV United	22	9	5	8	34	34	0	32	
7	Jebelle	22	8	6	8	42	31	+11	30	
8	Avenues United	22	8	4	10	47	42	+5	28	
9	Camdonia Chelsea	22	6	3	13	27	44	−17	21	
10	Bequia United	21	5	5	11	34	52	−18	20	
11	Largo Height (R)	22	4	7	11	35	59	−24	19	Relegated to SVGFF First Division
12	Pride & Joy (R)	22	5	2	15	36	76	−40	17	Relegated to SVGFF First Division

Source: SVGFF
(C) Champions; (R) Relegated
