= 2017 SVGFF Premier Division =

SVGFF Premier Division
- Season: 2017
- Champions: Avenues United FC

The 2017 SVGFF Premier Division is the seventh season of top-tier football in Saint Vincent and the Grenadines under its current format, and it is also the 12th season of top flight football altogether. The season started on 26 March and concluded on 13 August 2017.

== Standings ==
Pos	Team	Pld	W	D	L	GF	GA	GD	Pts	Qualification or relegation
1	Avenues United FC	11	8	3	0	48	13	+35	27	Champions
2	System 3 FC	11	7	1	3	39	16	+23	22	
3	Pastures FC	11	6	4	1	33	11	+22	22	
4	Hope International FC	11	6	4	1	24	16	+8	22	
5	Je Belle	11	4	4	3	19	14	+5	16	
6	Sion Hill FC	11	5	1	5	21	18	+3	16	
7	SV United	11	5	1	5	22	26	−4	16	
8	Camdonia Chelsea SC	11	4	1	6	24	19	+5	13	
9	Bequia United FC	11	4	1	6	19	34	−15	13	
10	Pride & Joy	11	1	4	6	17	51	−34	7	
11	Volcanoes	11	1	3	7	14	42	−28	6	Relegation to lower division
12	Greggs	11	1	1	9	23	43	−20	4	Relegation to lower division

Updated to match(es) played on unknown. Source:
