= 2019–20 SVGFF Premier Division =

SVGFF Premier Division
- Season: 2019–20
- Dates: 24 November 2019 – 6 September 2020 (Note: The season was scheduled to begin on 24 November 2020 and conclude on 12 April 2020.)
- Champions: Hope International

The 2019–20 SVGFF Premier Division was the eighth season of the SVGFF Premier Division, the top-tier football in Saint Vincent and the Grenadines under its current format, and it was also the 13th season of top flight football altogether. The season began on 24 November 2019, and was originally scheduled to end on 12 April 2020. Due to the COVID-19 pandemic, the season was suspended on 12 March 2020, and play did not resume until 11 August 2020, where the final six rounds were played through 6 September 2020.

Hope International won the league title, making it their fourth ever league title, and their first since 2015.

Many games take place at the 3,500-capacity Victoria Park (Kingstown).

== Table ==
Pos	Team	Pld	W	D	L	GF	GA	GD	Pts	Qualification or relegation
1	Hope International (C)	22	16	2	4	61	30	+31	50	2021 Caribbean Club Shield
2	Fitz Hughes Predators (Q)	22	14	4	4	53	23	+30	46	
3	System 3	22	14	3	5	67	34	+33	45	
4	Jebelle	22	13	4	5	46	26	+20	43	
5	Pastures United	22	11	2	9	43	41	+2	35	
6	Sion Hill	22	8	5	9	41	40	+1	29	
7	Avenues United	22	7	6	9	36	41	−5	27	
8	Awesome	22	7	5	10	22	47	−25	26	
9	SV United (R)	22	7	3	12	33	38	−5	24	Relegation to the SVGFF First Division
10	Camdonia Chelsea (R)	22	5	2	15	30	59	−29	17	Relegation to the SVGFF First Division
11	Bequia United (R)	22	5	2	15	30	66	−36	17	Relegation to the SVGFF First Division
12	Greiggs (R)	22	4	4	14	44	61	−17	16	Relegation to the SVGFF First Division

Source: RSSSF
(C) Champions; (Q) Qualified for the phase indicated; (R) Relegated

== Stadiums ==
Team	Location	Stadium	Capacity
Hope International	Kingstown	Victoria Park	3,500
Fitz Hughes Predators			
System 3	Kingstown	Victoria Park	3,500
Jebelle			
Pastures United	Kingstown	Victoria Park	3,500
Sion Hill			
Avenues United	Kingstown	Victoria Park	3,500
Awesome			
SV United			
Camdonia Chelsea	Campden Park	Campden Park Playing Field	2,000
Bequia United	Port Elizabeth	Clive Tannis Playing Field	500
Greiggs			
