= Oryan Velox =

Vincentian international footballer

Personal information
- Full name: Oryan Brian Velox
- Date of birth: 28 October 2004 (age 22)
- Place of birth: Layou, Saint Vincent and the Grenadines
- Height: 1.80 m (5 ft 11 in)
- Position: Midfielder

Youth career
- –2019: System 3

Senior career*
Years	Team	Apps	(Gls)
2019–2022	Layou		
2022–2023	Rot-Weiß Erfurt	0	(0)
2023–2024	VfR Aalen	0	(0)

International career^{‡}
2021–	Saint Vincent and the Grenadines	7	(3)
- * Club domestic league appearances and goals as of 16:59, 28 March 2024 (UTC) ‡ National team caps and goals as of 00:02, 28 May 2024 (UTC)

Oryan Velox (born 28 October 2004) is a Vincentian footballer who last played for VfR Aalen and the Saint Vincent and the Grenadines national team.

== Club career ==
=== Youth ===
Velox's skill was apparent from a young age. He led his school team to the bronze medal in the 2015 Primary Schools Football Championship as the league's top scorer that season. At the club level, as a youth Velox came through the youth setup of System 3. He was the National Under-14 League's top scorer with the club in 2018 with ten goals. He scored two goals against Avenues United in the final to secure the championship. Also in 2018, he was one of two Vincentians chosen to travel to Trinidad and Tobago for a skills competition and opportunity to be observed by scouts from Manchester United. As part of the Barrouallie Secondary squad, Velox scored a hat-trick in the final match of the 2018 SVGFF Inter-Secondary Schools Football Tournament to secure the school's third consecutive championship. He was the top scorer of the same competition while playing for Central Leeward Secondary School the following year.

=== Senior ===
By 2019, Velox had moved to Layou FC in the First Division before the team was promoted to the Premier Division for the 2020/2021 season. Following the 2019/2020 season, the 15-year-old was one of three finalists for the National Sports Council's Sportsperson of the Year award. In 2022, he went on trial in Germany through the Soccer Academy Arnstadt and eventually joined the academy of Rot-Weiß Erfurt.

In September 2023, it was announced that he had moved to Regionalliga Südwest club VfR Aalen on a one-year deal. Club management referred to the player as an "unpolished diamond" at the time of the signing. The following month, the player was still waiting to make his official debut for his new club as he had not yet received his work clearances. After Aalen was relegated to the Oberliga following the 2023–24 season, Velox was released from the squad.

== International career ==
Velox represented Saint Vincent and the Grenadines at various youth levels. He was the top scorer of the 2019 CONCACAF Boys' Under-15 Championship with six goals in four matches. To qualify for the tournament, Saint Vincent and the Grenadines topped Group A in the 2014 Caribbean Football Union U14 Challenge Shield played on Saint Kitts and Nevis. Velox scored four goals in as many matches in the tournament. In 2021, he was part of the squad that competed in 2022 CONCACAF U-20 Championship qualifying. Velox served as the team's captain and scored in a 2–0 victory over Barbados in the last match of the group stage.

In March 2021, Velox received his first call-up to the senior national team for a pair of 2022 FIFA World Cup qualification matches. He was called up again in preparation for the June qualifiers. He went on to make his senior international debut on 4 June 2021 in a match against Guatemala at age sixteen. He scored his first senior international goal on 21 November 2023 in a 3–0 victory over Belize in 2023–24 CONCACAF Nations League B. With the win, Saint Vincent and the Grenadines secured second place in Group B. In May 2024, Velox scored in a 1–3 friendly defeat to Dominica. Later that month, he scored in another friendly versus Grenada in preparation for 2026 FIFA World Cup qualification.

=== International goals ===
Scores and results list Saint Vincent and the Grenadines' goal tally first.

No.	Date	Venue	Opponent	Score	Result	Competition
1	21 November 2023	Kirani James Athletic Stadium, St. George's, Grenada	Belize	3–0	3–0	2023–24 CONCACAF Nations League B
2	2 May 2024	Victoria Park, Kingstown, Saint Vincent and the Grenadines	Dominica	1–0	1–3	Friendly
3	26 May 2024	Lauriston Mini Stadium, Carriacou, Grenada	Grenada	1–0	3–0	Friendly
Last updated 26 May 2024

=== International career statistics ===
As of match played 26 May 2024.

Saint Vincent and the Grenadines
2021	2	0
2022	0	0
2023	2	1
2024	3	2
Total	7	3
