= Diel Spring =

Vincentian footballer

Personal information
- Full name: Diel Reon Spring
- Date of birth: 26 December 2000 (age 25)
- Place of birth: Chateaubelair, Saint Vincent and the Grenadines
- Height: 1.69 m (5 ft 7 in)
- Position: Midfielder

Team information
- Current team: North Leeward Predators

Youth career
- North Leeward Predators

Senior career*
Years	Team	Apps	(Gls)
2017–2020	North Leeward Predators		
2020–2021	Wisła Sandomierz	11	(0)
2021–2022	Podlasie Biała Podlaska	31	(2)
2023–	North Leeward Predators		

International career^{‡}
- Saint Vincent and the Grenadines U17
2018	Saint Vincent and the Grenadines U20	5	(0)
2018–	Saint Vincent and the Grenadines	29	(2)
- * Club domestic league appearances and goals as of 22 June 2023 ‡ National team caps and goals as of 8 September 2024

Diel Reon Spring (born December 26, 2000) is a Vincentian footballer who plays as a midfielder for North Leeward Predators and the Saint Vincent and the Grenadines national team.

== Early years ==
Spring hails from the village of Chateaubelair. His mother is a chef and his father is a construction worker while his grandparents were farmers.

Spring led St Martin’s Secondary School to a junior division title in the 2015 Secondary Schools’ Football Competition, scoring a brace in the final. The following year he was named best midfielder of the Barrouallie Football League under-17 division as a member of the North Leeward Predators youth set-up.

He also participated in sports such as athletics and cricket.

== Club career ==
During the 2017 season in the second-tier SVGFF First Division, Spring helped the Predators finish the regular season undefeated and reach the championship final, where he scored the opening goal of the match as they defeated Largo Height via penalty shoot-out. He was nominated for Youth Male Player of the Year at the 2017 National Football Awards. That same year, he and future international teammate Joel Quashie were chosen as the winners of a Caribbean Football Union- and Manchester United-backed skills-based competition for young talents, earning invitations to a talent development camp in Trinidad and Tobago.

The next season, Spring captained the Predators to a runner-up league finish in the SVGFF Premier Division and a Knock Out Cup title. He recorded a brace against Bequia United in week 10, and repeated the feat against System 3 in week 17. He finished the season with a hat-trick in a 4–1 win against Largo Height on the final match-day. At the end of the year he was named Best Midfielder at the National Football Awards.

In the summer of 2020, he signed a deal with Wisła Sandomierz in the Polish III liga. He admits his time at the club was not ideal, having only played a few matches due to injuries and other problems.

On 26 July 2021, Spring moved to another III liga side, Podlasie Biała Podlaska. Here he was coached by Rafał Borysiuk, brother of Ariel Borysiuk.

== International career ==
=== Youth team ===
In November 2018, he represented the national under-20 team at the 2018 CONCACAF U-20 Championship, playing in all five matches.

=== Senior team ===
On 8 September 2018, Spring made his debut for Saint Vincent and the Grenadines in the qualifying rounds of the 2019–20 CONCACAF Nations League against Nicaragua. He came on as a halftime substitution for Wendell Cuffy in the 2–0 defeat at home. He was called up again later that month, earning his second international cap three weeks later during a friendly against a Barbados XI made up mostly of under-20 players preparing for the 2018 CONCACAF U-20 Championship. He came on after halftime yet again, this time for Brad Richards, in the 1–1 draw. He made two further appearances in CONCACAF Nations League qualifying to finish the year.

In February 2019, Spring was named to the 20-man squad selected to play at the 2019 Windward Islands Tournament on home soil. He played in all four matches as Saint Vincent and the Grenadines won their fifth title.

== Career statistics ==
=== International ===
As of matches played 8 September 2024.

National team	Year	Apps	Goals
Saint Vincent and the Grenadines	2018	4	0
Saint Vincent and the Grenadines	2019	10	0
Saint Vincent and the Grenadines	2021	4	0
Saint Vincent and the Grenadines	2022	1	0
Saint Vincent and the Grenadines	2023	3	1
Saint Vincent and the Grenadines	2022	7	1
Total		29	2

== Honours ==
=== Club ===
Fitz Hughes Predators

- Knock Out Cup: 2019
- SVGFF First Division: 2017

=== Individual ===
- SVGFF Best Midfielder: 2019
- SVGFF Youth Male Player of the Year: 2017

=== International ===
Saint Vincent and the Grenadines

- Windward Islands Tournament: 2019
