= SVGFF Women's Premier Division =

- Country: Saint Vincent and the Grenadines
- Confederation: CONCACAF
- Number of clubs: 7
- Level on pyramid: 1
- Current champions: Largo Height FC (2023)
- Broadcaster(s): VC3TV
- Website: SVGFF

SVGFF Women's Premier Division is the top division league of football in Saint Vincent and the Grenadines. It is organized by the Saint Vincent and the Grenadines Football Federation, under the National Club Championships umbrella.

== Clubs ==
- Bequia United FC
- Camdonia Chelsea
- Jebelle FC
- Largo Height FC
- North Leeward Predators
- Owia United
- Toni Stores Jugglers

== List of champions ==
Season	Champion
2023	Largo Height FC
