= Saint Vincent and the Grenadines national football team =

Saint Vincent and the Grenadines
- Nickname: Vincy Heat
- Association: Saint Vincent and the Grenadines Football Federation (SVGFF)
- Confederation: CONCACAF (North America)
- Sub-confederation: CFU (Caribbean)
- Head coach: Michael Findlay
- Captain: Cornelius Stewart
- Most caps: Cornelius Stewart (82)
- Top scorer: Oalex Anderson (34)
- Home stadium: Arnos Vale Stadium
- FIFA code: VIN
First colours	Second colours

FIFA ranking
- Current: 165 ▲1 (18 November 2026)
- Highest: 73 (October 2007)
- Lowest: 180 (January 2017, December 2018 – February 2019)

First international
- Saint Vincent and the Grenadines 1–1 Barbados (Saint Vincent and the Grenadines; 12 September 1936)

Biggest win
- Montserrat 0–11 Saint Vincent and the Grenadines (Woodlands, Montserrat; 7 May 1995)

Biggest defeat
- Mexico 11–0 Saint Vincent and the Grenadines (Mexico City, Mexico; 6 December 1992)

CONCACAF Gold Cup
- Appearances: 2 (first in 1996)
- Best result: Group stage (1996)
Medal record
CFU Championship / Caribbean Cup
Silver medal – second place	1979 Suriname	Team
Silver medal – second place	1981 Puerto Rico	Team
Silver medal – second place	1995 Cayman Islands and Jamaica	Team

The Saint Vincent and the Grenadines national football team, officially designated as St Vincent and the Grenadines by FIFA, represents Saint Vincent and the Grenadines in men's international football, and is governed by the Saint Vincent and the Grenadines Football Federation, the governing body for football in Saint Vincent and the Grenadines founded in 1979. It has been a full member of FIFA since 1988, a full member of CONCACAF since 1986, and is also a member of CFU in the Caribbean Zone.

St Vincent and the Grenadines has never qualified for the FIFA World Cup, but has qualified for the CONCACAF Gold Cup twice, the first time in 1996. It has participated five times in League B of the CONCACAF Nations League. In subcontinental competitions, the team finished as runners-up twice in the CFU Championship and once in the Caribbean Cup.

St Vincent and the Grenadines' debut in international competitions was in the 1979 CFU Championship, finishing as runners-up, and the team's first appearance in World Cup qualifiers was for 1994 qualification. The first victory in the team's history was in 1961 by defeating Grenada 6–3.

== History ==
=== 1936–1995 ===
Saint Vincent and the Grenadines played their first two international matches, against their neighbour Barbados in 1936 - both matches ending in a 1–1 draw. In the '60s and '70s, they played several editions of the Windward Islands Tournament, winning the 1965 and 1966 competitions. They also participated in the 1979, qualifying to the final stage and finishing in second place behind Haiti. In the following edition, in 1981, they reached the final stage but again finished in second, this time two points off of Trinidad and Tobago.

Saint Vincent and the Grenadines qualified for the inaugural 1989 Caribbean Cup, finishing top of their qualification group including a 9–0 victory over Sint Maarten. In the finals, they would fail to get out of the group, finishing bottom behind Grenada and Netherlands Antilles. They would reach the final phase of the Caribbean Cup again in consecutive years, 1992 and 1993, without much luck, finishing last and second last respectively.

At the end of 1992, the Vincy Heat participated in their first World Cup qualifiers. They got through the first rounds, eliminating Saint Lucia (3–2 on aggregate) and Suriname (2–1 on aggregate), to advance to the second phase, where they finished bottom of the group, with six losses in as many games. Especially painful was the 11–0 defeat that Mexico dealt them at the Azteca Stadium, the worst in their history.

=== 1996 Gold Cup ===
Saint Vincent and the Grenadines qualified for the 1996 CONCACAF Gold Cup, by obtaining the runner-up position in the 1995 Caribbean Cup. During qualification for the Caribbean Cup, Vincy Heat had dispatched Montserrat 20–0 over two legs. They had gone on to finish top of their group in the main competition and defeated Cuba in the semi-finals 3–2, however Trinidad and Tobago proved too strong in the final and won 5–0. In the 1996 Gold Cup, the Vincy Heat failed to register a victory, losing 5–0 to Mexico and 3–0 to Guatemala.

=== 1996–present ===
Saint Vincent and the Grenadines would qualify again for the 1996 Caribbean Cup but this time finish bottom of their group. It would be eleven years before they qualified again, on goals scored, following their 8–0 thrashing of Saint Lucia with five goals from Shandel Samuel which saw them edge out Jamaica. In the 2007 tournament, Vincy Heat only managed one win, against Guyana 2–0, and finished bottom of their group again.

In 1998 World Cup qualifiers, the Saint Vincentian team beat Puerto Rico 9–1 over two legs, then defeated Saint Kitts and Nevis on away goals, thanks to a 2–2 draw in Basseterre. In the third round of qualifying they finished with six defeats in six games, including an 11–3 loss to Honduras. In the 2002 qualifiers, they beat the U.S. Virgin Islands 14–1 on aggregate, Saint Kitts and Nevis (4-2) and Antigua and Barbuda (5–2) but again finished without a win in the qualification semi-finals.

They improved in the 2006 qualifiers beating Nicaragua to advance to the third round for the third consecutive time, and obtaining two victories over Saint Kitts and Nevis, finishing in third place. However, in the 2010 qualifiers, they were eliminated for the first time in the second qualifying round, at the hands of Canada, who prevailed with an aggregate score of 7–1. In 2014 qualification, Saint Vincent and the Grenadines won once against Grenada to finish 13 points behind Guatemala. In 2018 World Cup qualification, they managed to beat Guyana 6–6 on away goals, then beat Aruba 3–2 to make it to the fourth round group stage. There they failed to get a single point, conceding 34 goals and finishing bottom of their group, including a 9–3 loss to Guatemala.

== Results and fixtures ==
The following is a list of match results in the last 12 months, as well as any future matches that have been scheduled.

Win Draw Loss Fixture

=== 2025 ===
4 June 2026 FIFA World Cup qualification (CONCACAF)	Saint Vincent and the Grenadines	6-0	Anguilla	Kingstown, Saint Vincent and the Grenadines
	Oalex Anderson 20', 69'; Cornelius Stewart 25'; Micah Joseph 59'; Kyle Edwards 61'; Kirtney Franklyn 85'			Stadium: Arnos Vale Stadium

10 June 2026 FIFA World Cup qualification (CONCACAF)	Puerto Rico	2-1	Saint Vincent and the Grenadines	Mayagüez Athletics Stadium, Puerto Rico
21:00 (AST)	Steven Echeverria 77'; Leandro Antonetti 11'		Oalex Anderson 47'

5 October Friendly	Saint Vincent and the Grenadines	7-0	Cuba	Arnos Vale Stadium, Saint Vincent and the Grenadines
19:00 (AST)	Oalex Anderson 14'; Steven Pierre 29'; Cornelius Stewart 43', 90+4'; Garret Leigertwood 74', 90+1'; Azinho Solomon 89'

8 October Friendly	Saint Vincent and the Grenadines	1-0	Cuba	Arnos Vale Stadium, Saint Vincent and the Grenadines
20:00 (AST)	Oalex Anderson 73'

12 November 2025–26 CONCACAF Series	Dominican Republic	2–0	Saint Vincent and the Grenadines	Santiago, Dominican Republic
20:00 UTC−4	Mörschel 17'; Paniagua 57'			Stadium: Estadio Cibao FC

15 November 2025–26 CONCACAF Series	Saint Vincent and the Grenadines	3–1	Saint Lucia	Santiago, Dominican Republic
20:00 UTC−4	Anderson 12'; Spring 13'; Solomon 62'		Elva 45'	Stadium: Estadio Cibao FC

=== 2026 ===
26 March 2025–26 CONCACAF Series	Bonaire	3–1	Saint Vincent and the Grenadines	Rincon, Bonaire
20:30 UTC−4	Koorn 39'; Christopher 57' (o.g.); Isenia 77' (pen.)	Report	Pierre 37'	Stadium: Stadion Antonio Trenidat; Referee: Norberto da Silva (Curaçao)

29 March 2025–26 CONCACAF Series	Barbados	2–3	Saint Vincent and the Grenadines	Rincon, Bonaire
16:00 UTC−4	Banton 51'; Oughterson 59'	Report	Franklyn 28'; Solomon 38'; Anderson 78'	Stadium: Stadion Antonio Trenidat; Referee: Evens Julmis (Bahamas)

26 September 2026–27 CONCACAF Nations League	Saint Vincent and the Grenadines	2–1	French Guiana	Belmopan, Belize
17:00 UTC−4	O. Anderson 14', 29'	Report	Y. Nozile 63'	Stadium: FFB Stadium

29 September 2026–27 CONCACAF Nations League	Belize	0–1	Saint Vincent and the Grenadines	Belmopan, Belize
22:00 UTC−4		Report	Johnson 10'	Stadium: FFB Stadium

3 October 2026–27 CONCACAF Nations League	Sint Maarten	2–4	Saint Vincent and the Grenadines	Belmopan, Belize
17:00 UTC−4	De Nooijer 74'; Christina 82'	Report	Anderson 11', 24', 57'; Hughes 34' (o.g.)	Stadium: FFB Stadium; Referee: Jorge Ojeda (Nicaragua)

6 October 2026–27 CONCACAF Nations League	Saint Vincent and the Grenadines	4–0	Sint Maarten	Belmopan, Belize
17:00 UTC−4	Anderson 21'; Spring 40'; Solomon 44'; Stewart 73'	Report		Stadium: FFB Stadium; Referee: Filiberto Martinez (El Salvador)

14 November 2026–27 CONCACAF Nations League	Saint Vincent and the Grenadines	1–0	Belize	Kingstown, Saint Vincent and the Grenadines
20:00 UTC−4	C. Stewart 35'	Report		Stadium: Arnos Vale Stadium; Referee: Daniel Quintero (Mexico)

17 November 2026–27 CONCACAF Nations League	French Guiana	1-0	Saint Vincent and the Grenadines	Kingstown, Saint Vincent and the Grenadines
20:00 UTC−4	Jean-Yves Monimofou 24'			Stadium: Arnos Vale Stadium

=== 2027 ===
March 2027 2026-27 CONCACAF Nations League B SF	Saint Lucia	v	Saint Vincent and the Grenadines

== Coaching staff ==
Position	Name
Head coach	(Saint Vincent and the Grenadines) Ezra Hendrickson
Assistant coaches	(Saint Vincent and the Grenadines) Rohan Webster (Saint Vincent and the Grenadines) Otis Devine
Fitness coach	(Saint Vincent and the Grenadines) Kemar Henry
Goalkeeping coach	(Saint Vincent and the Grenadines) Oswald Montclair
Massage therapist	(Saint Vincent and the Grenadines) Denzil Appleton
Team doctors	(Saint Vincent and the Grenadines) Dr. Andriw Cooper (Saint Vincent and the Grenadines) Dr. Katherine Austin
Physiotherapists	(Saint Vincent and the Grenadines) Marlon Gavins (Saint Vincent and the Grenadines) Waylon Foster (Saint Vincent and the Grenadines) Priscilla Irwin (Saint Vincent and the Grenadines) Jebediah Andrews
Match analyst	(Saint Vincent and the Grenadines) Denny Vincent
Performance analyst	(Saint Vincent and the Grenadines) Windell Houston
Technical director	(Saint Vincent and the Grenadines) Kendale Mercury

=== Coaching history ===
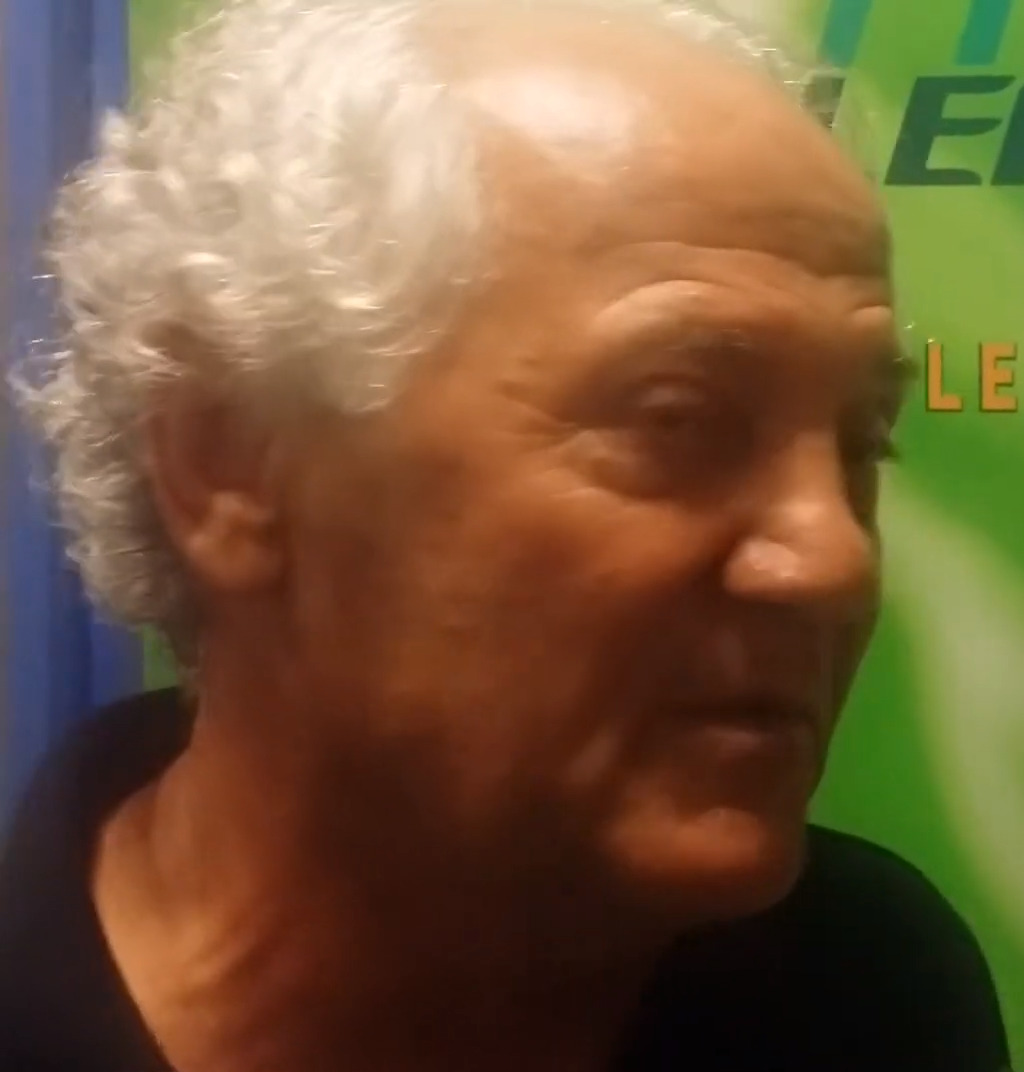
Zoran Vraneš became the manager of St. Vincent and the Grenadines in 2004

- (Germany) Jochen Figge (1985)
- (Saint Vincent and the Grenadines) Elliot Millington (1990–1992)
- (Brazil) Jorge Ramos (1992)
- (Argentina) Ignacio Vergelli (1992–1995)
- (Jamaica) Lenny Taylor (1995–1996)
- (Trinidad and Tobago) Bertille St. Clair (1996)
- (Saint Vincent and the Grenadines) Samuel Carrington (1996–2000)
- (Jamaica) Lenny Taylor (2000–2001)
- (Jamaica) Elvis Brown (2002)
- (England) Adrian Shaw (2003)
- (Serbia and Montenegro) / (Serbia) Zoran Vraneš (2004–2007)
- (Saint Vincent and the Grenadines) Roger Gurley (2008)
- (Saint Vincent and the Grenadines) Kendale Mercury (2009)
- (England) Stewart Hall (2009–2011)
- (England) Colwyn Rowe (2011)
- (Saint Vincent and the Grenadines) Cornelius Huggins (2012–2016)
- (Saint Vincent and the Grenadines) Keith Ollivierre (2016)
- (Saint Vincent and the Grenadines) Cornelius Huggins (2016–2018)
- (Saint Vincent and the Grenadines) Keith Ollivierre (2018)
- (Saint Vincent and the Grenadines) Kendale Mercury (2018–2023)
- (Saint Vincent and the Grenadines) Bishon Williams (2023)
- (Saint Vincent and the Grenadines) Theon Gordon (2023–2024)
- (Saint Vincent and the Grenadines) Ezra Hendrickson (2024–Present)

== Players ==
=== Current squad ===
The following players were called up for the friendly against Saint Kitts and Nevis on 20 May 2025.

Caps and goals correct as of 26 March 2025, after the match against Jamaica.

No.	Pos.	Player	Date of birth (age)	Caps	Goals	Club
	GK	Kenyan Lynch	15 December 1985 (age 40)	17	0	Unknown
	GK	Garwin Davis	7 April 2004 (age 22)	7	0	(Saint Vincent and the Grenadines Football Federation) System 3
	GK	Samir Bristol		2	0	(Saint Vincent and the Grenadines Football Federation) North Leeward Predators
	DF	Jamal Yorke	9 October 1991 (age 35)	33	0	(Antigua and Barbuda Football Association) Parham
	DF	Najima Burgin	16 October 1996 (age 30)	22	0	(Saint Vincent and the Grenadines Football Federation) Jebelle
	DF	Nigel Charles	20 March 2003 (age 23)	10	0	(Saint Vincent and the Grenadines Football Federation) Camdonia Chelsea
	DF	Dimitri Thomas	1 March 2007 (age 19)	2	0	(Saint Vincent and the Grenadines Football Federation) Jebelle
	MF	Nazir McBurnette	18 February 1993 (age 33)	58	5	(Saint Vincent and the Grenadines Football Federation) Hope International
	MF	Diel Spring	26 December 2000 (age 25)	34	5	(Saint Vincent and the Grenadines Football Federation) North Leeward Predators
	MF	Kennijha Joseph	10 August 2000 (age 26)	23	0	(Saint Vincent and the Grenadines Football Federation) Layou
	MF	Addeen Charles	17 March 1996 (age 30)	13	0	(Saint Vincent and the Grenadines Football Federation) North Leeward Predators
	MF	Kirtney Franklyn	5 March 2005 (age 21)	9	0	(Barbados Football Association) Britton's Hill United
	MF	Bishon Richards	1 June 2003 (age 23)	7	0	(Saint Vincent and the Grenadines Football Federation) Hope International
	MF	Saviola Blake	4 April 2004 (age 22)	4	0	Unknown
	FW	Cornelius Stewart	7 October 1989 (age 37)	76	25	(Football Association of Indonesia) Barito Putera
	FW	Azinho Solomon	12 October 1994 (age 32)	47	7	(Saint Vincent and the Grenadines Football Federation) System 3
	FW	Steven Pierre	21 May 2005 (age 21)	17	4	(Saint Vincent and the Grenadines Football Federation) Jebelle
	FW	Garret Leigertwood	19 February 2000 (age 26)	12	1	(Saint Vincent and the Grenadines Football Federation) Avenues United

=== Recent call-ups ===
Pos.	Player	Date of birth (age)	Caps	Goals	Club	Latest call-up
DF	Andrew Johnson	3 February 2004 (age 22)	3	1	(United States) Cornell Big Red	v. Belize, 29 September 2026
Notes: ^{INJ} = Withdrew due to injury; ^{PRE} = Preliminary squad / standby; ^{RET} = Retired from the national team; ^{SUS} = Serving suspension; ^{WD} = Player withdrew from the squad due to non-injury issue.

== Player records ==
As of 8 October 2025
Players in bold are still active with Saint Vincent and the Grenadines.

=== Most appearances ===
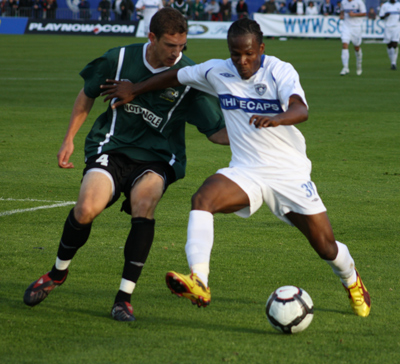
Cornelius Stewart (right) is Saint Vincent and the Grenadines' most capped player with 79 appearances.

Rank	Player	Caps	Goals	Career
1	**Cornelius Stewart**	79	27	2007–present
2	Dorren Hamlet	65	2	2008–2023
3	Shandel Samuel	63	32	2001–2016
3	Kendall Velox	63	15	1992–2008
5	Roy Richards	59	1	2008–2016
6	Melvin Andrews	58	0	1996–2008
6	Myron Samuel	58	23	2008–2018
6	**Nazir McBurnette**	58	5	2011–present
9	Emerald George	52	5	2007–2016
10	**Kevin Francis**	51	2	2014–present

=== Top goalscorers ===
Rank	Player	Goals	Caps	Ratio	Career
1	Shandel Samuel	32	63	0.52	2001–2016
2	**Cornelius Stewart**	27	79	0.34	2007–present
3	**Oalex Anderson**	24	52	0.46	2014–present
4	Rodney Jack	24	36	0.67	1992–2004
5	Myron Samuel	23	58	0.4	2008–2018
6	Alwyn Guy	16	39	0.41	1996–2008
7	Kendall Velox	15	63	0.24	1992–2008
8	**Chavel Cunningham**	12	28	0.43	2015–present
9	Andre Hinds	11	11	1	1995–1996
9	Renson Haynes	11	18	0.61	2001–2006

== Competitive record ==
=== FIFA World Cup ===
FIFA World Cup record									FIFA World Cup qualification					
Year	Round	Position	Pld	W	D*	L	GF	GA	Pld	W	D	L	GF	GA
1930 to 1978	Part of United Kingdom								Part of United Kingdom					
1982 to 1990	Not a FIFA member								Not a FIFA member					
(United States) 1994	Did not qualify								10	2	1	7	5	32
(France) 1998	Did not qualify								10	2	2	6	17	33
(South Korea) (Japan) 2002	Did not qualify								12	5	0	7	24	29
(Germany) 2006	Did not qualify								8	3	1	4	11	15
(South Africa) 2010	Did not qualify								2	0	0	2	1	7
(Brazil) 2014	Did not qualify								6	1	2	3	4	12
(Russia) 2018	Did not qualify								10	1	2	7	15	42
(Qatar) 2022	Did not qualify								4	1	0	3	3	16
(Canada) (Mexico) (United States) 2026	Did not qualify								4	1	0	3	9	9
(Morocco) (Portugal) (Spain) 2030	To be determined								To be determined					
(Saudi Arabia) 2034	To be determined								To be determined					
Total		0/9							66	16	8	42	89	195

=== CONCACAF Gold Cup ===
CONCACAF Championship / Gold Cup record
Year	Round	Position	Pld	W	D	L	GF	GA	Squad
1963 to 1985	Not a CONCACAF member								
1989 and 1991	Did not enter								
(Mexico) (United States) 1993	Did not qualify								
(United States) 1996	Group stage	9th	2	0	0	2	0	8	Squad
1998 to 2002	Did not qualify								
(Mexico) (United States) 2003	Did not enter								
2005 to 2025	Did not qualify								
2027	Qualified								
Total	Group stage	2/19	2	0	0	2	0	8	–

CONCACAF Gold Cup history
First match	Mexico 5–0 Saint Vincent and the Grenadines (11 January 1996; San Diego, United States)
Biggest Win	–
Biggest Defeat	Mexico 5–0 Saint Vincent and the Grenadines (11 January 1996; San Diego, United States)
Best Result	Group stage (1996)
Worst Result	Group stage (1996)

=== CONCACAF Nations League ===
CONCACAF Nations League record
League										Finals								
Season	Division	Group	Pld	W	D	L	GF	GA	P/R	Finals	Result	Pld	W	D	L	GF	GA	Squad
2019–20	B	D	6	3	2	1	6	4	Same position	(United States) 2021	Ineligible							
2022–23	B	C	6	0	2	4	5	14	Same position	(United States) 2023	Ineligible							
2023–24	B	C	6	3	0	3	13	14	Same position	(United States) 2024	Ineligible							
2024–25	B	A	6	4	1	1	12	7	Same position	(United States) 2025	Ineligible							
2026-27	B	D	6	5	0	1	12	4	▲	(United States) 2027	Ineligible							
Total	—	—	30	15	5	10	48	43	—	Total	0 Titles	—	—	—	—	—	—	—

=== Caribbean Cup ===
Caribbean Cup record
Year	Round	Position	Pld	W	D*	L	GF	GA
(Barbados) 1989	Group stage	6th	2	0	1	1	1	3
(Trinidad and Tobago) 1990	Abandoned		2	0	0	2	2	5
(Jamaica) 1991	Did not enter							
(Trinidad and Tobago) 1992	Group stage	8th	3	0	0	3	1	4
(Jamaica) 1993	Group stage	8th	3	0	0	3	4	10
(Trinidad and Tobago) 1994	Did not qualify							
(Cayman Islands) (Jamaica) 1995	Runners-up	2nd	5	3	1	1	13	11
(Trinidad and Tobago) 1996	Group stage	7th	3	0	1	2	2	7
1997 to 2005	Did not qualify							
(Trinidad and Tobago) 2007	Group stage	6th	3	1	0	2	2	4
2008 to 2017	Did not qualify							
Total	Runners-up	7/19	21	4	3	14	25	44

=== Windward Islands Tournament ===
Windward Islands Tournament Record
Year	Group Pos.
1949 to 1960	???
(Saint Lucia) 1961	Runner-up
1962	Runner-up
(Dominica) 1963	Abandoned
(Saint Lucia) 1964-65	Runner-up
(Saint Vincent and the Grenadines) 1965	Champions
(Grenada) 1966	Champions
1967 and 1968	???
(Saint Vincent and the Grenadines) 1969	Runner-up
1970 and 1971	???
(Saint Lucia) 1972	Runner-up
1973	Champions
(Saint Lucia) 1974	Runner-up
1975 to 1978	???
(Saint Lucia) 1984	Runner-up
(Grenada) 1985	Runner-up
1986 to 1995	???
(Grenada) 2001	Runner-up
(Saint Vincent and the Grenadines) 2013	3rd
(Dominica) 2014	Runner-up
(Saint Lucia) 2015	Champions
(Grenada) 2017	4th
(Saint Vincent and the Grenadines) 2019	Champions

== H2H ==
H2H
Name	Pld	W	D	L	CONCACAF Rank
Anguilla	4	4	0	0	41
Antigua and Barbuda	11	4	2	5	32
Aruba	2	1	0	1	30
Bahamas	3	1	1	1	39
Barbados	26	7	9	10	28
Belize	7	3	2	2	29
Bermuda	4	2	1	1	27
Bonaire	4	2	1	1	33
British Virgin Islands	7	5	2	0	40
Canada	3	0	0	3	3
Cayman Islands	3	1	2	0	36
Costa Rica	3	0	0	3	5
Cuba	9	3	1	5	20
Curaçao/Netherlands Antilles	6	3	2	1	10
Dominica	36	18	11	7	34
Dominican Republic	2	1	0	1	14
El Salvador	5	1	0	4	15
French Guiana	6	3	2	1	21
Grenada	43	14	16	13	26
Guadeloupe	10	4	1	5	17
Guatemala	6	0	0	6	9
Guyana	8	3	3	2	16
Haiti	6	0	1	5	7
Honduras	6	0	0	6	8
Jamaica	11	1	2	8	6
Martinique	21	7	5	9	13
Mexico	7	0	0	7	1
Montserrat	5	5	0	0	25
Nicaragua	7	2	3	2	19
Puerto Rico	4	3	1	1	22
Saint Kitts and Nevis	15	7	4	4	24
Saint Lucia	35	15	6	14	23
Sint Maarten	3	3	0	0	35
Suriname	10	4	3	3	11
Trinidad and Tobago	22	5	4	13	12
Turks and Caicos Islands	1	0	0	1	37
United States	2	0	0	2	2
U.S. Virgin Islands	2	2	0	0	38

H2H- CONCACAF Gold Cup
Name	Pld	W	D	L
Guatemala	1	0	0	1
Mexico	1	0	0	1

H2H-CONCACAF Nations League B
Name	Pld	W	D	L
Bahamas	2	0	1	1
Belize	4	4	0	0
Bermuda	2	1	0	1
Bonaire	2	1	1	0
Dominica	2	1	0	1
El Salvador	2	1	0	1
French Guiana	4	1	0	3
Montserrat	2	2	0	0
Nicaragua	4	1	2	1
Sint Maarten	2	2	0	0
Suriname	2	1	1	0
Trinidad and Tobago	2	0	0	2

H2H-CONCACAF Nations League Qualifiers
Name	Pld	W	D	L
Bonaire	1	1	0	0
French Guiana	1	1	0	0
Nicaragua	1	0	0	1
Turks and Caicos Islands	1	0	0	1

H2H-CONCACAF Gold Cup Prelims
Name	Pld	W	D	L
Haiti	1	0	0	1
Jamaica	2	0	1	1

H2H-CFU Championship/Caribbean Cup Qualifiers
Name	Pld	W	D	L
Anguilla	3	3	0	0
Antigua and Barbuda	1	0	0	1
Bahamas	1	1	0	0
Barbados	4	1	1	2
Bermuda	2	1	1	0
British Virgin Islands	3	2	1	0
Cayman Islands	2	1	1	0
Cuba	1	0	1	0
Curaçao/Netherlands Antilles	4	3	1	0
Dominica	4	3	1	0
Dominican Republic	1	1	0	0
French Guiana	1	0	1	0
Grenada	6	3	3	0
Guadeloupe	2	0	0	2
Guyana	2	1	0	1
Haiti	2	0	0	2
Jamaica	1	1	0	0
Martinique	13	6	2	5
Montserrat	3	3	0	0
Saint Kitts and Nevis	3	0	1	2
Saint Lucia	6	1	1	4
Sint Maarten	1	1	0	0
Suriname	4	1	1	2
Trinidad and Tobago	5	1	2	2

H2H-CFU Championship/Caribbean Cup
Name	Pld	W	D	L
Antigua and Barbuda	1	1	0	0
Barbados	1	0	0	1
Cayman Islands	1	0	1	0
Cuba	4	1	0	3
French Guiana	1	1	0	0
Grenada	1	0	0	1
Guadeloupe	2	0	0	2
Guyana	1	1	0	0
Haiti	2	0	1	1
Jamaica	1	0	0	1
Martinique	3	0	0	3
Netherlands Antilles	1	0	1	0
Puerto Rico	1	1	0	0
Saint Lucia	1	1	0	0
Trinidad and Tobago	2	0	0	2

H2H-FIFA World Cup Qualifiers CONCACAF
Name	Pld	W	D	L
Anguilla	1	1	0	0
Antigua and Barbuda	2	1	0	1
Aruba	2	1	0	1
Belize	2	0	1	1
British Virgin Islands	1	1	0	0
Canada	2	0	0	2
Costa Rica	2	0	0	2
Cuba	1	0	0	1
Curaçao	1	0	0	1
El Salvador	3	0	0	3
Grenada	2	1	1	0
Guatemala	5	0	0	5
Guyana	2	0	2	0
Honduras	6	0	0	6
Jamaica	4	0	0	4
Mexico	6	0	0	6
Nicaragua	2	1	1	0
Puerto Rico	3	2	0	1
Saint Kitts and Nevis	6	4	2	0
Saint Lucia	2	1	0	1
Suriname	3	1	1	1
Trinidad and Tobago	4	0	0	4
United States	2	0	0	2
U.S. Virgin Islands	2	2	0	0

H2H-Windward Islands Tournament
Name	Pld	W	D	L
Barbados	3	3	0	0
Dominica	23	11	9	3
Grenada	20	4	8	8
Saint Lucia	21	8	4	9

== Honours ==
=== Subcontinental ===
- CFU Championship / Caribbean Cup
  - (silver) Runners-up (3): 1979, 1981, 1995

=== Friendly ===
- Windward Islands Tournament (5): 1965, 1966, 1973, 2015, 2019
