= Cornelius Stewart =

Saint Vincentian footballer (born 1989)

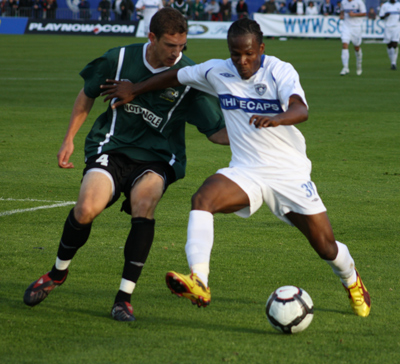
- Stewart playing for Vancouver Whitecaps in 2010

Personal information
- Full name: Cornelius Stewart
- Date of birth: 7 October 1989 (age 37)
- Place of birth: Questelles, Saint Vincent and the Grenadines
- Height: 5 ft 9 in (1.75 m)
- Position: Forward

Youth career
- 2001–2006: System 3 FC

Senior career*
| Years | Team | Apps | (Gls) |
| 2007–2008 | Newwill Hope International | 0 | (0) |
| 2009 | Whitecaps Residency | 1 | (0) |
| 2010 | Vancouver Whitecaps | 19 | (2) |
| 2010 | → Whitecaps Residency (loan) | 1 | (0) |
| 2011 | Vancouver Whitecaps FC U23 | 4 | (0) |
| 2012–2013 | Caledonia AIA | 7 | (9) |
| 2013 | OPS | 27 | (8) |
| 2014 | VPS | 21 | (5) |
| 2015–2016 | PS Kemi | 39 | (4) |
| 2017 | TC Sports Club | 27 | (20) |
| 2018 | Maziya | 23 | (20) |
| 2019 | Minerva Punjab | 0 | (0) |
| 2019–2022 | Maziya | 25 | (17) |
| 2022–2023 | Sheikh Jamal DC | 20 | (11) |
| 2023–2024 | Abahani Limited Dhaka | 16 | (19) |
| 2024–2026 | Semen Padang | 49 | (9) |
| 2026 | → Barito Putera (loan) | 9 | (0) |

International career^{‡}
| 2007–2009 | Saint Vincent and the Grenadines U20 | 14 | (13) |
| 2007– | Saint Vincent and the Grenadines | 83 | (28) |
- * Club domestic league appearances and goals as of 25 April 2026 ‡ National team caps and goals as of 17 November 2026

Cornelius Stewart (born 7 October 1989) is a Saint Vincentian professional footballer who plays as a forward for the Saint Vincent and the Grenadines national team.

== Club career ==
Stewart attended Kingstown Anglican Primary School and Intermediate High School, and began his career in 2001 with the youth soccer team System 3 FC on his home island of Saint Vincent. He moved to Newwill Hope International FC of the Saint Vincent and the Grenadines National League Championship in 2007, and played for them throughout the 2007–08 season, before moving to Canada in 2009 when he joined the Vancouver Whitecaps Residency programme.

He was promoted to the Vancouver Whitecaps senior team in 2010, and played for their reserve squad in 2011 after Vancouver moved to Major League Soccer season. After being released from the reserve team, Stewart signed for Caledonia AIA of the TT Pro League.

After one season with Caledonia, Stewart signed with Oulun Palloseura of Finland's second tier, Ykkönen, on a 1-year contract following a ten-day trial with the club. Following a season with Oulun Palloseura in which Stewart scored 10 goals in 28 matches, Stewart signed a 1+1 contract with Vaasan Palloseura of the Veikkausliiga, Finland's premier division, following a month-long trial. It was announced on 1 April 2015 that after one season with VPS, Stewart signed a 1+1 deal with PS Kemi Kings.

In 2017 it was reported that Stewart had joined T.C. Sports Club of the Dhivehi League in the Maldives. Since then, he has go on to score a total of 22 goals in his debut season in the Maldives in all competition.

At the end of January 2019, Stewart joined Indian I-League club Minerva Punjab FC. Stewart returned to Maziya for the 2019–20 season.

== International career ==
Stewart played for the St Vincent U-20 team, netting 10 goals in 10 games, before making his debut for the senior team in a 2010 FIFA World Cup qualification game, against Canada.

=== International goals ===
Score lists Saint Vincent and the Grenadine's goal tally first.

| No. | Date | Venue | Opponent | Score | Result | Competition |
|---|---|---|---|---|---|---|
| 1. | 6 October 2010 | Arnos Vale Stadium, Arnos Vale, Saint Vincent and the Grenadines | Montserrat | 4–0 | 7–0 | 2010 Caribbean Cup qualification |
| 2. | 2 November 2010 | Manny Ramjohn Stadium, Marabella, Trinidad and Tobago | Trinidad and Tobago | 2–2 | 2–6 | 2010 Caribbean Cup qualification |
| 3. | 18 September 2011 | Arnos Vale Stadium, Arnos Vale, Saint Vincent and the Grenadines | Grenada | 2–0 | 2–1 | 2014 FIFA World Cup qualification |
| 4. | 11 November 2011 | FFB Field, Belmopan, Belize | Belize | 1–0 | 1–1 | 2014 FIFA World Cup qualification |
| 5. | 1 September 2012 | Arnos Vale Stadium, Arnos Vale, Saint Vincent and the Grenadines | Barbados | 2–0 | 2–0 | Friendly |
| 6. | 2 September 2012 | Arnos Vale Stadium, Arnos Vale, Saint Vincent and the Grenadines | Barbados | 1–0 | 1–1 | Friendly |
| 7. | 21 October 2012 | Beausejour Stadium, Gros Islet, Saint Lucia | Guyana | 2–1 | 2–1 | 2012 Caribbean Cup qualification |
| 8. | 25 October 2012 | Beausejour Stadium, Gros Islet, Saint Lucia | Curaçao | 1–0 | 4–0 | 2012 Caribbean Cup qualification |
| 9. | 25 October 2012 | Beausejour Stadium, Gros Islet, Saint Lucia | Curaçao | 3–0 | 4–0 | 2012 Caribbean Cup qualification |
| 10. | 16 November 2012 | Dwight Yorke Stadium, Bacolet, Trinidad and Tobago | Cuba | 1–0 | 1–1 | 2012 Caribbean Cup qualification |
| 11. | 12 October 2014 | Stade René Serge Nabajoth, Les Abymes, Guadeloupe | Martinique | 1–0 | 3–4 | 2014 Caribbean Cup qualification |
| 12. | 12 October 2014 | Stade René Serge Nabajoth, Les Abymes, Guadeloupe | Martinique | 2–1 | 3–4 | 2014 Caribbean Cup qualification |
| 13. | 10 June 2015 | Arnos Vale Stadium, Arnos Vale, Saint Vincent and the Grenadines | Guyana | 1–1 | 2–2 | 2018 FIFA World Cup qualification |
| 14. | 28 February 2019 | Victoria Park, Kingstown, Saint Vincent and the Grenadines | Barbados | 1–0 | 2–0 | 2019 Windward Islands Tournament |
| 15. | 2 March 2019 | Victoria Park, Kingstown, Saint Vincent and the Grenadines | Saint Lucia | 2–1 | 2–1 | 2019 Windward Islands Tournament |
| 16. | 11 October 2019 | Arnos Vale Stadium, Arnos Vale, Saint Vincent and the Grenadines | Suriname | 1–2 | 2–2 | 2019–20 CONCACAF Nations League B |
| 17. | 11 October 2019 | Arnos Vale Stadium, Arnos Vale, Saint Vincent and the Grenadines | Suriname | 2–2 | 2–2 | 2019–20 CONCACAF Nations League B |
| 18. | 14 October 2019 | André Kamperveen Stadion, Paramaribo, Suriname | Suriname | 1–0 | 1–0 | 2019–20 CONCACAF Nations League B |
| 19. | 13 June 2022 | Hasely Crawford Stadium, Port of Spain, Trinidad and Tobago | Trinidad and Tobago | 1–2 | 1–4 | 2022–23 CONCACAF Nations League B |
| 20. | 24 September 2022 | Lauriston Mini Stadium, Carriacou, Grenada | Grenada | 1–0 | 3–1 | Friendly |
| 21. | 24 September 2022 | Lauriston Mini Stadium, Carriacou, Grenada | Grenada | 2–0 | 3–1 | Friendly |
| 22. | 16 October 2023 | Stade Pierre-Aliker, Fort-de-France, Martinique | French Guiana | 1–0 | 2–3 | 2023–24 CONCACAF Nations League B |
| 23. | 16 October 2023 | Stade Pierre-Aliker, Fort-de-France, Martinique | French Guiana | 2–1 | 2–3 | 2023–24 CONCACAF Nations League B |
| 24. | 8 September 2024 | Stadion Antonio Trenidat, Rincon, Bonaire | Montserrat | 1–0 | 2–0 | 2024–25 CONCACAF Nations League B |
| 25. | 14 November 2024 | Estadio Cuscatlán, San Salvador, El Salvador | Montserrat | 2–0 | 2–1 | 2024–25 CONCACAF Nations League B |
| 26. | 5 June 2025 | Arnos Vale Stadium, Arnos Vale, Saint Vincent and the Grenadines | Anguilla | 2–0 | 6–0 | 2026 FIFA World Cup qualification |
| 27. | 6 October 2025 | Arnos Vale Stadium, Arnos Vale, Saint Vincent and the Grenadines | Cuba | 3–0 | 7–0 | Friendly |
| 28. | 14 November 2026 | Arnos Vale Stadium, Arnos Vale, Saint Vincent and the Grenadines | Belize | 1–0 | 1–0 | 2026–27 CONCACAF Nations League |
