= Chavel Cunningham =

Saint Vincentian footballer (born 1995)

Personal information
- Full name: Chavel Cunningham
- Date of birth: 20 July 1995 (age 31)
- Place of birth: Barrouallie, Saint Vincent and the Grenadines
- Position: Centre forward

Team information
- Current team: Pastures FC

Senior career*
Years	Team	Apps	(Gls)
2011–2014	FC Topsidaz		
2014–2015	System 3 FC		
2016–2017	Grenades F.C.		
2017–2019	Pastures FC		
2019	San Juan Jabloteh F.C.		
2019–2022	Pastures FC		
2022–2023	Tryum F.C.		
2024	Attackers FC		
2024–	Pastures FC		
2015–	Saint Vincent and the Grenadines	29	(12)
- * Club domestic league appearances and goals ‡ National team caps and goals as of 24 October 2025

Chavel Cunningham (born 20 July 1995) is a Saint Vincentian professional footballer. He has been playing for the Saint Vincent and the Grenadines national team since 2015. He plays as a centre forward for Pastures FC.

== Early life ==
Chavel Cunningham was born on 20 July 1995 in St Vincent.

== Career ==
=== Club career ===
Cunningham played for FC Topsidaz from 2011 to 2014, and then for System 3 FC from 2014 to 2015, when he transferred to Grenades F.C. in 2016, staying with the club until 2017.

Transferring to Pastures FC in 2017, Cunningham finished as the top scorer in the 2018-19 SVGFF Premier Division, scoring 25 goals. He played for San Juan Jabloteh F.C. for some time in 2019 before returning to Pastures until 2022.

He has also played for Tryum F.C. (2022–2023) and Attackers FC (2024), before returning to Pastures in that year.

=== International career ===
International player since 2015, as of October 2025 he had 29 caps and 12 goals scored for the national team. He is among the top 10 scorers in the Saint Vincent and the Grenadines national team.

September 2019 he scored the winning goal in a game against Dominica.

== Career statistics ==
=== International ===
As of match played 27 March 2023

Appearances and goals by national team and year
National team	Year	Apps	Goals
Saint Vincent and the Grenadines	2015	5	1
Saint Vincent and the Grenadines	2016	–	
Saint Vincent and the Grenadines	2017	4	3
Saint Vincent and the Grenadines	2018	4	0
Saint Vincent and the Grenadines	2019	12	7
Saint Vincent and the Grenadines	2020	–	
Saint Vincent and the Grenadines	2021	–	
Saint Vincent and the Grenadines	2022	1	1
Saint Vincent and the Grenadines	2023	2	0
Total		28	12

Scores and results list Saint Vincent and the Grenadines' goal tally first, score column indicates score after each Cunningham goal.

List of international goals scored by Chavel Cunningham
No.	Date	Venue	Opponent	Score	Result	Competition
1	6 March 2015	Barbados National Stadium, Saint Michael, Barbados	Barbados	1–3	1–3	Friendly
2	28 June 2017	Kirani James Athletic Stadium, St. George's, Grenada	Saint Lucia	1–2	1–2	2017 Windward Islands Tournament
3	3 July 2017	Kirani James Athletic Stadium, St. George's, Grenada	Grenada	1–2	3–4	2017 Windward Islands Tournament
4	4 July 2017	Kirani James Athletic Stadium, St. George's, Grenada	Barbados	1–0	4–2	2017 Windward Islands Tournament
5	28 February 2019	Victoria Park, Kingstown, Saint Vincent and the Grenadines	Barbados	2–0	2–0	2019 Windward Islands Tournament
6	6 March 2019	Victoria Park, Kingstown, Saint Vincent and the Grenadines	Dominica	1–0	2–1	2019 Windward Islands Tournament
7	6 March 2019	Victoria Park, Kingstown, Saint Vincent and the Grenadines	Dominica	2–1	2–1	2019 Windward Islands Tournament
8	8 March 2019	Victoria Park, Kingstown, Saint Vincent and the Grenadines	Grenada	1–0	1–1	2019 Windward Islands Tournament
9	21 March 2019	Arnos Vale Stadium, Arnos Vale, Saint Vincent and the Grenadines	Bonaire	2–1	2–1	2019–20 CONCACAF Nations League qualification
10	11 August 2019	Chili Playing Field, Georgetown, Saint Vincent and the Grenadines	Trinidad and Tobago	1–0	1–0	Friendly
11	8 September 2019	Arnos Vale Stadium, Arnos Vale, Saint Vincent and the Grenadines	Dominica	1–0	1–0	2019–20 CONCACAF Nations League B
12	24 September 2022	Lauriston Mini Stadium, Carriacou, Grenada	Grenada	3–1	3–1	Friendly

== Honours ==
In March 2019, Cunningham was the leading goal scorer in the Windward Islands Football Association (WIFA) senior men's tournament, with four goals, and earned MVP awards as most valuable player of both the St Vincent and the Grenadines team and the WIFA Tournament overall.

- Pastures FC
  - SVGFF Premier Division (1): 2018-2019

Cunningham was leading goal-scorer in the premier division, and also won the awards for the senior male footballer of the year and the male footballer of the year at the SVGFF awards in November 2019.
