= SVGFF Second Division =

- Country: Saint Vincent and the Grenadines
- Confederation: CONCACAF
- Number of clubs: 12
- Level on pyramid: 3
- Promotion to: SVGFF First Division
- Current champions: Brownstown United FC (2022/2023)
- Website: https://svgff.org/

The Second Division is the third and lowest tier of senior men's football in Saint Vincent and the Grenadines. It is organized by the Saint Vincent and the Grenadines Football Federation, under the National Club Championships umbrella. Each year, the league winners are promoted to the SVGFF First Division. The league features twelve clubs.

In the past, the league has been divided into zones and often features the developmental sides of clubs in the Premier Division. Clubs in the league must meet CONCACAF club licensing requirements. As of 2024, the prize money for the winning club is approximately $10,000.
