= Lemus Christopher =

Vincentian footballer

Personal information
- Full name: Lemus Dareon Shane Christopher
- Date of birth: May 27, 1995 (age 31)
- Place of birth: Layou, St. Vincent & the Grenadines
- Height: 6 ft 6 in (1.98 m)
- Position: Goalkeeper

Team information
- Current team: CS Mont-Royal Outremont

Senior career*
Years	Team	Apps	(Gls)
- Layou FC
2015–2018	Hope International FC		
2018–2019	Pastures United FC		
2021–2022	CS Mont-Royal Outremont	4	(0)
2023–2024	CS Longueuil	21	(0)
2026–	CS Mont-Royal Outremont	1	(0)

International career^{‡}
2015–	Saint Vincent and the Grenadines	29	(0)
- * Club domestic league appearances and goals as of 9 April 2026 ‡ National team caps and goals as of 31 December 2025

Lemus Dareon Shane Christopher (born 27 May 1995) is a Vincentian footballer who plays as a goalkeeper for CS Mont-Royal Outremont and the Saint Vincent and the Grenadines national football team.

== Early life ==
While in high school, he was named MVP of the Senior Finals in 2012. He also won a bronze medal in high jump at the 2013 Windward Islands School Games, clearing a height of 1.90 metres.

== Playing career ==
He began his playing career with Hope International FC.

In 2021, he began playing with Canadian side CS Mont-Royal Outremont in the Première ligue de soccer du Québec, with whom he won the PLSQ title that season. In 2022, he became the fourth player in league history to earn a national team call-up.

In 2023, he began playing with CS Longueuil.

== International career ==
He made his first appearance for the Saint Vincent and the Grenadines national team on March 8, 2015. On 9 September 2024, he earned a clean sheet in a 2-0 victory over Montserrat, recording back-to-back penalty saves in the match after initially being called for leaving his line early. He was named to the CONCACAF Nations League Best XI for September 2024.

== Career statistics ==
=== International ===
As of match played December 31, 2025

Appearances and goals by national team and year
National team	Year	Apps	Goals
Saint Vincent and the Grenadines	2015	2	0
Saint Vincent and the Grenadines	2016	7	0
Saint Vincent and the Grenadines	2017	2	0
Saint Vincent and the Grenadines	2018	1	0
Saint Vincent and the Grenadines	2019	0	0
Saint Vincent and the Grenadines	2020	0	0
Saint Vincent and the Grenadines	2021	0	0
Saint Vincent and the Grenadines	2022	2	0
Saint Vincent and the Grenadines	2023	2	0
Saint Vincent and the Grenadines	2024	9	0
Saint Vincent and the Grenadines	2025	4	0
Total		29	0
