= 2022 CONCACAF U-20 Championship qualifying =

2022 CONCACAF U-20 Championship qualifying stage
Tournament details
- Host country: Dominican Republic
- Dates: 5–13 November 2021
- Teams: 18 (from 1 confederation)

Tournament statistics
- Matches played: 31
- Goals scored: 131 (4.23 per match)
- Top scorer(s): (Curaçao) Juruel Bernadina (6 goals)

2022 CONCACAF U-20 Championship qualifying took place between 5–13 November 2021 in Santo Domingo, Dominican Republic. The teams compete for four of the twenty berths in the 2022 CONCACAF U-20 Championship final tournament.

== Teams ==
The 41 CONCACAF teams were ranked based on the CONCACAF Men's Under-20 Ranking as of June 2019. A total of 34 teams entered the tournament. The highest-ranked 16 entrants were exempt from qualifying and advanced directly to the group stage of the final tournament, while the lowest-ranked 18 entrants participated in qualifying, where the four group winners advanced to the round of 16 of the knockout stage of the final tournament.

Exempt from qualifying (16 teams)
Rank	Team	Points
1	United States	7,092
2	Mexico	6,167
3	Panama	5,065
4	Honduras	4,794
5	Costa Rica	3,466
6	El Salvador	3,395
7	Cuba	2,644
8	Haiti	2,455
9	Canada	2,404
10	Trinidad and Tobago	2,395
11	Guatemala	2,187
12	Jamaica	2,089
13	Antigua and Barbuda	1,535
14	Suriname	1,327
15	Saint Kitts and Nevis	1,325
16	Aruba	1,248

Key to colours
Group winners advance to 2022 CONCACAF U-20 Championship

Participating in qualifying stage (18 teams)
Rank	Team	Points
17	Dominican Republic	1,232
18	Bermuda	1,214
19	Curaçao	1,194
20	Nicaragua	1,193
21	Puerto Rico	1,150
23	Saint Lucia	871
24	Grenada	856
25	Guyana	773
26	Dominica	772
27	Cayman Islands	730
28	Saint Vincent and the Grenadines	723
30	Belize	655
31	Barbados	528
32	Saint Martin (Note: Non-FIFA members and thus ineligible to play in World Cup.)	500
33	U.S. Virgin Islands	499
34	Sint Maarten	466
36	Anguilla	55
39	British Virgin Islands	0

Did not enter tournament (7 teams)
Rank	Team	Points
22	Guadeloupe	1,050
29	Martinique	681
35	Turks and Caicos Islands	67
37	Montserrat	0
38	French Guiana	0
40	Bonaire	0
41	Bahamas	0

== Draw ==
The draw for the qualifying round took place on 17 September 2021, 11:00 EST (UTC−4), at the CONCACAF Headquarters in Miami. The 19 teams which initially entered the qualifying stage were drawn into four groups: three groups of five teams and one group of four teams. Montserrat, initially drawn into Group C, later withdrew before the start of the tournament.

Pot 1	Pot 2	Pot 3	Pot 4	Pot 5
Dominican Republic; Bermuda; Curaçao; Nicaragua	Puerto Rico; Saint Lucia; Grenada; Guyana	Dominica; Cayman Islands; Saint Vincent and the Grenadines; Belize	Barbados; Saint Martin; U.S. Virgin Islands; Sint Maarten	Anguilla; ~~Montserrat~~ (W); British Virgin Islands

- (W): Withdrew after draw

== Qualifying stage ==
The winners of each group qualified for the 2022 CONCACAF U-20 Championship, where they enter the round of 16 of the knockout stage.

All times are local, AST (UTC-04:00). (5/6 November matches ADT (UTC-03:00).

Tiebreakers

The ranking of teams in each group was determined as follows (Regulations Article 12.3):

1. Points obtained in all group matches (three points for a win, one for a draw, zero for a loss);
2. Goal difference in all group matches;
3. Number of goals scored in all group matches;
4. Points obtained in the matches played between the teams in question;
5. Goal difference in the matches played between the teams in question;
6. Number of goals scored in the matches played between the teams in question;
7. Fair play points in all group matches (only one deduction could be applied to a player in a single match):
  - Yellow card: −1 points;
  - Indirect red card (second yellow card): −3 points;
  - Direct red card: −4 points;
  - Yellow card and direct red card: −5 points;
8. Drawing of lots.

=== Group A ===
Pos	Team	Pld	W	D	L	GF	GA	GD	Pts	Qualification
1	Curaçao	4	4	0	0	23	2	+21	12	2022 CONCACAF U-20 Championship
2	Grenada	4	3	0	1	18	6	+12	9	
3	British Virgin Islands	4	2	0	2	2	11	−9	6	
4	Sint Maarten	4	1	0	3	2	10	−8	3	
5	Dominica	4	0	0	4	2	18	−16	0	

Source: CONCACAF
5 November 2021
16:00

Grenada	7–0	Sint Maarten
Belfon 14'; Dea. Phillip 42', 90+4'; Bowen 45'; Joseph 45+4'; S. Williams 61'; Ettienne 73'	Report

Estadio Panamericano, San Cristóbal
Referee: Moeth Gaymes (Saint Vincent and the Grenadines)
5 November 2021
19:00

Curaçao	7–0	British Virgin Islands
Felicia 4', 29'; Sambo 18', 49'; Bernadina 25'; Dorand 90'; Potmis 90+3'	Report

Estadio Panamericano, San Cristóbal
Referee: Jefferson Escobar (Honduras)

7 November 2021
15:00

Dominica	2–5	Grenada
Anselm 6'; Lawrence 53'	Report	Ettienne 8', 59'; Joseph 32', 45+3'; S. Williams 80' (pen.)

Estadio Panamericano, San Cristóbal
Referee: Germán Martínez (El Salvador)
7 November 2021
18:00

Curaçao	2–0	Sint Maarten
Kastaneer 14'; Bernadina 40'	Report

Estadio Panamericano, San Cristóbal
Referee: Óscar Mejía (Mexico)

9 November 2021
15:00

Sint Maarten	2–0	Dominica
Craane 37'; Eustace 88'	Report

Estadio Panamericano, San Cristóbal
Referee: Randy Encarnación (Dominican Republic)
9 November 2021
18:00

British Virgin Islands	0–4	Grenada
	Report	Clarke 27'; Lawlite 33'; Lemoud 45+2'; Ettienne 67'

Estadio Panamericano, San Cristóbal
Referee: Erick Lezama (Nicaragua)

11 November 2021
15:00

British Virgin Islands	1–0	Sint Maarten
Chalwell 70'	Report

Estadio Panamericano, San Cristóbal
Referee: Adonis Carrasco (Dominican Republic)
11 November 2021
18:00

Dominica	0–10	Curaçao
	Report	Does 5', 86'; Felicia 11', 45'; Bernadina 14', 24', 53' (pen.), 59' (pen.); Ilaria 64'; Augustine 84' (o.g.)

Estadio Panamericano, San Cristóbal
Referee: Steffon Dewar (Jamaica)

13 November 2021
15:00

Dominica	0–1	British Virgin Islands
	Report	Forbes 39' (pen.)

Estadio Panamericano, San Cristóbal
Referee: Julio Luna (Guatemala)
13 November 2021
18:00

Curaçao	4–2	Grenada
Inesia 42'; Sambo 45', 77'; Does 46'	Report	Dea. Phillip 59'; Clarke 81'

Estadio Panamericano, San Cristóbal
Referee: Randy Encarnación (Dominican Republic)

=== Group B ===
Pos	Team	Pld	W	D	L	GF	GA	GD	Pts	Qualification
1	Dominican Republic (H)	4	3	1	0	12	2	+10	10	2022 CONCACAF U-20 Championship
2	Saint Lucia	4	2	2	0	10	4	+6	8	
3	Belize	4	2	1	1	10	3	+7	7	
4	Anguilla	4	0	1	3	2	15	−13	1	
5	Saint Martin	4	0	1	3	5	15	−10	1	

Source: CONCACAF
(H) Hosts
5 November 2021
16:00

Saint Lucia	5–2	Saint Martin
Caull 4', 43', 89'; Berthier 10'; Caroo 87'	Report	Isidor 8'; Fremondiere 40'

Félix Sánchez Olympic Stadium, Santo Domingo
Referee: Erick Lezama (Nicaragua)
5 November 2021
19:00

Dominican Republic	6–0	Anguilla
Joseph 2'; Martes 10'; Sandy 33'; Vargas 50'; Bryan 72' (o.g.); Azcona 74'	Report

Félix Sánchez Olympic Stadium, Santo Domingo
Referee: Edgar Ramírez (El Salvador)

7 November 2021
15:00

Belize	0–0	Saint Lucia
	Report

Félix Sánchez Olympic Stadium, Santo Domingo
Referee: Steffon Dewar (Jamaica)
7 November 2021
18:00

Dominican Republic	2–0	Saint Martin
More 18'; Joseph 40'	Report

Félix Sánchez Olympic Stadium, Santo Domingo
Referee: Pierre-Luc Lauzière (Canada)

9 November 2021
15:00

Saint Martin	1–6	Belize
Gomez 35' (o.g.)	Report	Augustine 13'; Daniels 15'; Reneau 31', 83'; Higinio 45+2'; Dubon 75'

Félix Sánchez Olympic Stadium, Santo Domingo
Referee: Moeth Gaymes (Saint Vincent and the Grenadines)
9 November 2021
18:00

Anguilla	0–3	Saint Lucia
	Report	Sandiford 30'; Bryan 38' (o.g.); Caroo 71'

Félix Sánchez Olympic Stadium, Santo Domingo
Referee: Joe Dickerson (United States)

11 November 2021
15:00

Anguilla	2–2	Saint Martin
Gayle 82', 88'	Report	Isidor 12' (pen.); Chilin 68'

Félix Sánchez Olympic Stadium, Santo Domingo
Referee: Pierre-Luc Lauzière (Canada)
11 November 2021
18:00

Belize	0–2	Dominican Republic
	Report	Montes de Oca 16'; Alvarez 23'

Félix Sánchez Olympic Stadium, Santo Domingo
Referee: Alex Chilowicz (United States)

13 November 2021
15:00

Belize	4–0	Anguilla
Higinio 19'; Daniels 38', 61'; Bradshaw 90+1' (o.g.)	Report

Félix Sánchez Olympic Stadium, Santo Domingo
Referee: Joe Dickerson (United States)
13 November 2021
18:00

Dominican Republic	2–2	Saint Lucia
Joseph 88'; Azcona 90+4'	Report	Caull 28', 45'

Félix Sánchez Olympic Stadium, Santo Domingo
Referee: David Gómez (Costa Rica)

=== Group C ===
Pos	Team	Pld	W	D	L	GF	GA	GD	Pts	Qualification
1	Puerto Rico	3	2	0	1	7	3	+4	6	2022 CONCACAF U-20 Championship
2	Saint Vincent and the Grenadines	3	2	0	1	5	3	+2	6	
3	Bermuda	3	2	0	1	6	8	−2	6	
4	Barbados	3	0	0	3	2	6	−4	0	

Source: CONCACAF
6 November 2021
16:00

Puerto Rico	0–3 Awarded (Note: Match suspended and later awarded to Saint Vincent and the Grenadines due to Puerto Rico failing to comply with Concacaf's COVID-19 protocols ahead of the fixture.)	Saint Vincent and the Grenadines
	Report

Félix Sánchez Olympic Stadium, Santo Domingo
6 November 2021
19:00

Bermuda	3–2	Barbados
Richardson 38'; Mills 41'; Jones 90+2'	Report	Lucas 35' (pen.); Morris 90+1'

Félix Sánchez Olympic Stadium, Santo Domingo
Referee: Julio Luna (Guatemala)

8 November 2021
15:00

Puerto Rico	1–0	Barbados
Mateo 10'	Report

Félix Sánchez Olympic Stadium, Santo Domingo
Referee: Adonis Carrasco (Dominican Republic)
8 November 2021
18:00

Bermuda	3–0	Saint Vincent and the Grenadines
Warner 48'; Hall 74'; Jones 83'	Report

Félix Sánchez Olympic Stadium, Santo Domingo
Referee: Jefferson Escobar (Honduras)

10 November 2021
15:00

Barbados	0–2	Saint Vincent and the Grenadines
	Report	Velox 61' (pen.); Richards 68' (pen.)

Félix Sánchez Olympic Stadium, Santo Domingo
Referee: Óscar Mejía (Mexico)
10 November 2021
18:00

Puerto Rico	6–0	Bermuda
de León 5', 62'; Cruz 40', 42'; Rivera 69' (pen.); Joseph 75' (o.g.)	Report

Félix Sánchez Olympic Stadium, Santo Domingo
Referee: Germán Martínez (El Salvador)

=== Group D ===
Pos	Team	Pld	W	D	L	GF	GA	GD	Pts	Qualification
1	Nicaragua	3	3	0	0	14	1	+13	9	2022 CONCACAF U-20 Championship
2	Cayman Islands	3	1	1	1	6	4	+2	4	
3	Guyana	3	1	1	1	5	6	−1	4	
4	U.S. Virgin Islands	3	0	0	3	3	17	−14	0	

Source: CONCACAF
6 November 2021
16:00

Guyana	0–0	Cayman Islands
	Report

Estadio Panamericano, San Cristóbal
Referee: Joe Dickerson (United States)
6 November 2021
19:00

Nicaragua	7–0	U.S. Virgin Islands
Batiz 7', 25'; Caceres 28', 80'; Talavera 33' (pen.); Gutiérrez 36'; Corrales 84'	Report

Estadio Panamericano, San Cristóbal
Referee: David Gómez (Costa Rica)

8 November 2021
15:00

Guyana	5–1	U.S. Virgin Islands
Glasgow 34', 41', 57'; Niles 45'; Coates 88'	Report	Henry 55' (pen.)

Estadio Panamericano, San Cristóbal
Referee: Edgar Ramírez (El Salvador)
8 November 2021
18:00

Nicaragua	2–1	Cayman Islands
Caceres 50'; Gutiérrez 71'	Report	Hendricks-Seymour 56'

Estadio Panamericano, San Cristóbal
Referee: Alex Chilowicz (United States)

10 November 2021
15:00

U.S. Virgin Islands	2–5	Cayman Islands
Henry 30' (pen.); William 90+3'	Report	Hendricks-Seymour 13', 78'; Conolly 53', 67'; Ebanks 65'

Estadio Panamericano, San Cristóbal
Referee: Julio Luna (Guatemala)
10 November 2021
18:00

Guyana	0–5	Nicaragua
	Report	Talavera 32', 48'; Batiz 54'; Palacios 60', 77'

Estadio Panamericano, San Cristóbal
Referee: David Gómez (Costa Rica)

== Goalscorers ==
There were 131 goals scored in 31 matches, for an average of 4.23 goals per match.

6 goals

- (Curaçao) Juruel Bernadina

5 goals

- (Saint Lucia) Kegan Caull

4 goals

- (Curaçao) Gio-Renys Felicia
- (Curaçao) Naygiro Sambo
- (Grenada) Benjamin Ettienne

3 goals

- (Belize) Daijon Daniels
- (Cayman Islands) Shameer Hendricks-Seymour
- (Curaçao) Keanu Does
- (Dominican Republic) Jason Joseph
- (Grenada) Divonte Joseph
- (Grenada) Deanroy Phillip
- (Guyana) Omari Glasgow
- (Nicaragua) Keylon Bátiz
- (Nicaragua) Jareck Cáceres
- (Nicaragua) Widman Talavera

2 goals

- (Anguilla) Jauron Gayle
- (Belize) Kevin Higinio
- (Belize) Eldon Reneau
- (Bermuda) Stefan Jones
- (Cayman Islands) Syrus Conolly
- (Dominican Republic) Edison Azcona
- (Grenada) Keishon Clarke
- (Grenada) Shermine Williams
- (Nicaragua) Manuel Gutiérrez
- (Nicaragua) William Palacios
- (Puerto Rico) Daniel Cruz Jr.
- (Puerto Rico) Jeremy de León
- (Saint Lucia) Daneo Caroo
- (Collectivity of Saint Martin) Wendy Isidor
- (United States Virgin Islands) Naquan Henry

1 goal

- (Barbados) Kevon Lucas
- (Barbados) Zuhri Morris
- (Belize) Tyrese Augustine
- (Belize) Jaden Dubón
- (Bermuda) Sincere Hall
- (Bermuda) Keyni Mills
- (Bermuda) Jarryd Richardson
- (Bermuda) Jazir Warner
- (British Virgin Islands) Luka Chalwell
- (British Virgin Islands) Jake Forbes
- (Cayman Islands) Elder Ebanks
- (Curaçao) Shudelmar Dorand
- (Curaçao) Ghillian Ilaria
- (Curaçao) Rayhim Inesia
- (Curaçao) Sidney Kastaneer
- (Curaçao) Akram Potmis
- (Dominica) Felix Anselm
- (Dominica) Adriel Lawrence
- (Dominican Republic) Yordy Alvarez
- (Dominican Republic) Kefler Martes
- (Dominican Republic) Bryan More
- (Dominican Republic) Ángel Montes de Oca
- (Dominican Republic) Diefri Sandy
- (Dominican Republic) Adonis Vargas
- (Grenada) Shonnil Belfon
- (Grenada) Kimron Bowen
- (Grenada) Aquil Lawlite
- (Grenada) Ogiste Lemoud
- (Guyana) Ravi Coates
- (Guyana) Darron Niles
- (Nicaragua) Darwin Corrales
- (Puerto Rico) Jan Mateo
- (Puerto Rico) Wilfredo Rivera
- (Saint Lucia) Dahmanii Berthier
- (Saint Lucia) Brandon Sandiford
- (Collectivity of Saint Martin) Romalli Chilin
- (Collectivity of Saint Martin) Enzo Fremondiere
- (Saint Vincent and the Grenadines) Bishon Richards
- (Saint Vincent and the Grenadines) Oryan Velox
- (Sint Maarten) Jean-Jacques Craane
- (Sint Maarten) Reshawn Eustace
- (United States Virgin Islands) Arthbert William

1 own goal

- (Anguilla) Noah Bradshaw (against Belize)
- (Belize) Edwin Gomez (against Saint Martin)
- (Bermuda) Joshua Joseph (against Puerto Rico)
- (Dominica) Donte Augustine (against Curaçao)

2 own goals

- (Anguilla) Caleb Bryan (against the Dominican Republic and Saint Lucia)
