= 1983–84 Nottingham Forest F.C. season =

English football club season

Nottingham Forest
1983–84 season
- Chairman: Maurice Roworth
- Manager: Brian Clough
- Stadium: City Ground
- First Division: 3rd
- FA Cup: Third round
- League Cup: Third round
- UEFA Cup: Semi-finals
- Top goalscorer: League: Peter Davenport (15); All: Peter Davenport (17)
Home colours	Away colours

The 1983–84 season was Nottingham Forest's 119th year in existence and seventh consecutive season in the First Division. Aside from the league, the club also competed in the UEFA Cup, FA Cup and League Cup.

== Summary ==
In his ninth season as manager, Brian Clough transferred in Dutch midfielder Frans Thijssen from Ipswich Town only to be a flop and he left the club within months. On the contrary of the last three seasons, this campaign the offensive line had a good performance with Davenport, Birtles aimed by a superb midfield with Hodge and Walsh despite club legend John Robertson left the club during summer and signed with Peter Taylor's Derby County. After two early eliminations on FA Cup and League Cup the squad reached the UEFA Cup semifinals against RSC Anderlecht. In the first leg, the team took a 2–0 score in Nottingham and for the second leg the Belgian squad won 3–0 classifying to the 1984 UEFA Cup Final. According to Constant Vanden, then Anderlecht club president, the club paid a bribe to Spanish referee Emilio Guruceta Muro before the match. In 1997 the UEFA banned the Belgian club for one season for competing in its continental tournaments. In 2016 it was revealed that UEFA had evidence of the match-fixed scandal since 1992. Meanwhile, in League the squad finished on a decent third spot only 6 points below of Champions Liverpool and clinching a UEFA Cup spot for the second consecutive campaign.

== Squad ==
Note: Flags indicate national team as defined under FIFA eligibility rules; some limited exceptions apply. Players may hold more than one non-FIFA nationality.

Pos.	Nation	Player
GK	NED	Hans van Breukelen
GK	ENG	Steve Sutton
GK	ENG	Kevin Hitchcock
DF	ENG	Viv Anderson
DF	ENG	Bryn Gunn
DF	ENG	Chris Fairclough
DF	ENG	Colin Todd
DF	ENG	Mark Smalley
DF	ENG	Paul Hart
DF	ENG	Des Walker
DF	ENG	Nigel Johnson
DF	ENG	Les Robinson
DF	ENG	Kenny Swain
MF	ENG	Ian Bowyer (c)

Pos.	Nation	Player
MF	NED	Frans Thijssen
MF	ENG	Gary Mills
MF	ENG	Steve Wigley
MF	SCO	Colin Walsh
MF	ENG	Steve Hodge
MF	ENG	Adrian Shaw
FW	SCO	Ian Wallace
FW	ENG	Peter Davenport
FW	ENG	Garry Birtles
MF	NIR	Danny Wilson
FW	ENG	David Riley
FW	ENG	Shaun Finney
FW	ENG	David Longhurst

=== Transfers ===
In
Pos.	Name	from	Type
MF	Frans Thijssen	Ipswich Town	
MF	Paul Hart	Leeds United	
MF	Gary Mills	Derby County	loan ended
MF	Mark Smalley		
FW	David Riley	Keyworth United	
DF	Shaun Finney		
GK	Kevin Hitchcock	Barking	
FW	Nigel Johnson	Rotherham United	
FW	David Longhurst		
FW	Les Robinson		
MF	Adrian Shaw		

Out
Pos.	Name	To	Type
MF	John Robertson	Derby County	
DF	Willie Young	Brighton and Hove Albion	
DF	Stuart Gray	Barnsley F.C.	
MF	Mark Proctor	Sunderland	£100,000
FW	Liam Robinson	Southampton	
MF	Steve Kendal		

==== Winter ====
In
Pos.	Name	from	Type
DF	Des Walker		

Out
Pos.	Name	To	Type
GK	Ronnie Sinclair	Wrexham	loan
MF	Frans Thijssen	Vancouver Whitecaps	

== Results ==
=== Division One ===
==== League table ====
Pos	Team	Pld	W	D	L	GF	GA	GD	Pts	Qualification or relegation
1	Liverpool (C)	42	22	14	6	73	32	+41	80	Qualification for the European Cup first round
2	Southampton	42	22	11	9	66	38	+28	77	Qualification for the UEFA Cup first round
3	Nottingham Forest	42	22	8	12	76	45	+31	74	Qualification for the UEFA Cup first round
4	Manchester United	42	20	14	8	71	41	+30	74	Qualification for the UEFA Cup first round
5	Queens Park Rangers	42	22	7	13	67	37	+30	73	Qualification for the UEFA Cup first round

Source: World Football
Rules for classification: 1) Points; 2) Goal difference; 3) Goals scored
(C) Champions

==== Results by round ====
Round	1	2	3	4	5	6	7	8	9	10	11	12	13	14	15	16	17	18	19	20	21	22	23	24	25	26	27	28	29	30	31	32	33	34	35	36	37	38	39	40	41	42
Ground	H	A	A	H	H	A	H	A	H	A	H	H	A	H	A	H	A	H	A	H	H	A	H	A	H	A	A	A	H	A	H	A	H	H	A	A	H	H	A	H	A	H
Result	L	W	L	D	W	W	W	L	W	L	D	W	L	W	D	W	L	W	W	W	L	W	W	W	D	W	W	D	L	L	W	L	D	W	D	L	W	D	L	W	W	W
Position	17	10	15	14	9	9	7	10	8	11	11	7	8	11	7	6	11	8	6	5	5	4	4	3	4	2	2	2	3	3	3	3	3	3	3	3	3	5	5	5	4	2

Source: https://www.11v11.com/teams/nottingham-forest/tab/matches/season/1984/
A = Away; H = Home; W = Win; D = Draw; L = Loss; = Champions, Qualified to 1984–85 European Cup; = Qualified to 1984–85 UEFA Cup; = Relegated to Division Two

==== Matches ====
- .- Source: https://www.11v11.com/teams/nottingham-forest/tab/matches/season/1984/

27 August 1983 1	Nottingham Forest	0–1	Southampton	West Bridgford
			66' Danny Wallace	Stadium: City Ground; Attendance: 14,690; Referee: G Courtney

29 August 1983 2	Manchester United	1–2	Nottingham Forest	Manchester
	Kevin Moran 12'		66' Viv Anderson; 85' Peter Davenport	Stadium: Old Trafford; Attendance: 43,005; Referee: R Bridges

3 September 1983 3	Liverpool	1–0	Nottingham Forest	Liverpool
	Ian Rush 84'			Stadium: Anfield; Attendance: 31,376; Referee: J Lovatt

7 September 1983 4	Nottingham Forest	2–2	Aston Villa	West Bridgford
	Peter Davenport 40'; Garry Birtles 86'		17' Peter Withe; 69' Gary Shaw	Stadium: City Ground; Attendance: 16,379; Referee: JD Hough

10 September 1983 5	Nottingham Forest	3–2	Queen's Park Rangers	West Bridgford
	Steve Hodge 16'Peter Davenport 33'Bob Hazell 83' (og)		Ian Dawes 9' Simon Stainrod 61'	Stadium: City Ground; Attendance: 14,607; Referee: RF Nixon

17 September 1983 6	Norwich City	2–3	Nottingham Forest	Norwich
	Keith Bertschin 4'; John Deehan 38' (pen.)		23' (pen.), 43', 65' Colin Walsh	Stadium: Carrow Road; Attendance: 14,605; Referee: EJ Scales

24 September 1983 7	Nottingham Forest	1–0	Luton Town	West Bridgford
	Ian Wallace 58'			Stadium: City Ground; Attendance: 16,296; Referee: JB Worrall

2 October 1983 8	Tottenham Hotspur	2–1	Nottingham Forest	Tottenham
	Gary Stevens 70'; Steve Archibald 85'		5' Colin Walsh	Stadium: White Hart Lane; Attendance: 30,596; Referee: Al. Robinson

16 October 1983 9	Nottingham Forest	3–1	Notts County	West Bridgford
	Ian Wallace 8'; Ian Bowyer 28'; Peter Davenport 40'		9' (pen.) Trevor Christie	Stadium: City Ground; Attendance: 26,657; Referee: N Midgley

22 October 1983 10	Arsenal	4–1	Nottingham Forest	Islington
	Alan Sunderland 7'; Colin Hill 24'; Tony Woodcock 67', 77'		64' (pen.) Peter Davenport	Stadium: Highbury; Attendance: 22,872; Referee: K Cooper

29 October 1983 11	Nottingham Forest	1–1	Sunderland	West Bridgford
	Frans Thijssen 28'		61' Gary Rowell 61'	Stadium: City Ground; Attendance: 13,968; Referee: NJ Ashley

5 November 1983 12	Nottingham Forest	5–0	Wolverhampton Wanderers	West Bridgford
	Garry Birtles 6'; Peter Davenport 16' (pen.); Colin Walsh 55'; Steve Hodge 59', 62'			Stadium: City Ground; Attendance: 13,855; Referee: IJ Borrett

12 November 1983 13	Everton	1–0	Nottingham Forest	Walton
	Adrian Heath 22'			Stadium: Goodison Park; Attendance: 17,549; Referee: CN Seel

19 November 1983 14	Nottingham Forest	2–1	Ipswich Town	West Bridgford
	Garry Birtles 70'; Kenny Swain 71'		58' Terry Butcher	Stadium: City Ground; Attendance: 14,979; Referee: A Saunders

26 November 1983 15	Stoke City	1–1	Nottingham Forest	Stoke-on-Trent
	Mark Chamberlain 7'		3' (pen.) Colin Walsh	Stadium: Victoria Ground; Attendance: 11,661; Referee: DB Allison

4 December 1983 16	Nottingham Forest	3–2	Leicester City	West Bridgford
	Colin Walsh 14'; Ian Bowyer 21'; Frans Thijssen 78'		46' Robert Jones; 67' Alan Smith 67'	Stadium: City Ground; Attendance: 23,247; Referee: Art. Robinson

10 December 1983 17	Watford	3–2	Nottingham Forest	Watford
	Mo Johnston 6'; George Reilly 34'; Nigel Callaghan 36'		16', 49' Garry Birtles	Stadium: Vicarage Road; Attendance: 14,047; Referee: JC Deakin

17 December 1983 18	Nottingham Forest	3–0	West Ham United	West Bridgford
	Steve Hodge 25'; Garry Birtles 75'; Colin Walsh 85' (pen.)			Stadium: City Ground; Attendance: 14,440; Referee: TJ Holbrook

26 December 1983 19	Birmingham City	2–1	Nottingham Forest	Birmingham
	Kevin Rogers 6'		55' Garry Birtles; 84' Steve Hodge	Stadium: St Andrews; Attendance: 14,482; Referee: D Richardson

28 December 1983 20	Nottingham Forest	3–0	Coventry City	West Bridgford
	Peter Davenport 23'; Garry Birtles 53', 85'			Stadium: City Ground; Attendance: 22,169; Referee: TA Jones

31 December 1983 21	Nottingham Forest	0–1	Liverpool	West Bridgford
			29' Ian Rush	Stadium: City Ground; Attendance: 29,692; Referee: M Dimblebee

2 January 1984 22	Luton Town	2–3	Nottingham Forest	Luton
	Paul Walsh 9'; Emeka Nwajiobi 62'; Peter Davenport 43'		37' Garry Birtles; 39' Steve Hodge	Stadium: Kenilworth Road; Attendance: 12,126; Referee: DJ Axcell

21 January 1984 23	Nottingham Forest	3–0	Norwich City	West Bridgford
	Frans Thijssen 6'; Steve Hodge 17'; Viv Anderson 29'			Stadium: City Ground; Attendance: 13,993; Referee: R Guy

23 January 1984 24	Southampton	0–1	Nottingham Forest	Southampton
			Garry Birtles 30'	Stadium: The Dell; Attendance: 17,426; Referee: KG Salmon

4 February 1984 25	Nottingham Forest	2–2	Tottenham Hotspur	West Bridgford
	Steve Hodge 10'; Colin Walsh 66' (pen.)		26' Mark Falco; 90' Chris Hughton	Stadium: City Ground; Attendance: 21,428; Referee: T Mills

8 February 1984 26	West Bromwich Albion	0–5	Nottingham Forest	West Bromwich
			12' (pen.) Colin Walsh; 46' (o.g.) Ken McNaught; 53' Ian Bowyer; 79' Garry Birtles; 82' Viv Anderson	Attendance: 11,066; Referee: T Fitzharris

11 February 1984 27	Queens Park Rangers	0–1	Nottingham Forest	White City
			41' Garry Birtles	Stadium: Loftus Road; Attendance: 16,692; Referee: TD Spencer

18 February 1984 28	Sunderland	1–1	Nottingham Forest	Sunderland
	Gordon Chisholm 74'		85' Viv Anderson	Stadium: Roker Park; Attendance: 15,958; Referee: IA Hendrick

25 February 1984 29	Nottingham Forest	0–1	Arsenal	West Bridgford
			89' Paul Mariner	Stadium: City Ground; Attendance: 20,045; Referee: D Owen

3 March 1984 30	Wolverhampton Wanderers	1–0	Nottingham Forest	Wolverhampton
	Paul Hart 89' (o.g.)			Stadium: Molineux; Attendance: 10,476; Referee: D Scott

14 March 1984 31	Nottingham Forest	1–0	Everton	West Bridgford
	Steve Hodge 90'			Stadium: City Ground; Attendance: 13,647; Referee: AN Buksh

17 March 1984 32	Aston Villa	1–0	Nottingham Forest	Birmingham
	Steve McMahon 82'			Stadium: Villa Park; Attendance: 16,270; Referee: HW King

31 March 1984 33	Notts County	0–0	Nottingham Forest	Nottingham
				Stadium: Meadow Lane; Attendance: 18,357; Referee: K Walmsley

7 April 1984 34	Nottingham Forest	3–1	West Bromwich Albion	West Bridgford
	Colin Walsh 23' (pen.); Viv Anderson 45'; Ian Bowyer 83'		67' Garry Thompson	Stadium: City Ground; Attendance: 15,245; Referee: GM Tyson

14 April 1984 35	Ipswich Town	2–2	Nottingham Forest	Ipswich
	Romeo Zondervan 68'; Mich D'Avray 81'		1' Steve Wigley; 71' Peter Davenport	Attendance: 15,469; Referee: A Gunn

17 April 1984 36	Coventry City	2–1	Nottingham Forest	Coventry
	Mick Ferguson 8'; Nicky Platnauer 79'		85' Colin Walsh	Attendance: 9,816; Referee: AW Ward

21 April 1984 37	Nottingham Forest	5–1	Birmingham City	West Bridgford
	Peter Davenport 2', 89'; Colin Walsh 5'; Ian Wallace 66'; Ian Bowyer 70'		88' Mick Harford	Stadium: City Ground; Attendance: 15,323; Referee: JA Moules

28 April 1984 38	Nottingham Forest	0–0	Stoke City	West Bridgford
				Stadium: City Ground; Attendance: 13,625; Referee: RS Lewis

5 May 1984 39	Leicester City	2–1	Nottingham Forest	Leicester
	Steve Lynex 12'; Lineker 35'		80' Peter Davenport	Attendance: 16,600; Referee: DV Reeves

7 May 1984 40	Nottingham Forest	5–1	Watford	West Bridgford
	Paul Atkinson 3' (o.g.); Steve Hodge 11'; Peter Davenport 23', 55'; Ian Bowyer 61'		80' Mo Johnston	Stadium: City Ground; Attendance: 13,732; Referee: PN Willis

12 May 1984 41	West Ham United	1–2	Nottingham Forest	Upton Park
	Ray Stewart 19' (pen.)		21' Garry Birtles; 58' Peter Davenport	Stadium: Boleyn Ground; Attendance: 18,458; Referee: LC Shapter

16 May 1984 42	Nottingham Forest	2–0	Manchester United	West Bridgford
	Garry Birtles 34'; Viv Anderson 47'			Stadium: City Ground; Attendance: 23,651; Referee: DS Vickers

=== UEFA Cup ===
==== First Round ====
14 September 1983 1	Nottingham Forest (England)	2–0	(East Germany) Vorwärts (Frankfurt/Oder)	Nottingham
	Ian Wallace 15'; Steve Hodge 60'			Stadium: City Ground; Attendance: 14,994

28 September 1983 1	Vorwärts (Frankfurt/Oder) (East Germany)	1–0 (0–3 agg.)	(England) Nottingham Forest
			65' Ian Bowyer	Attendance: 18,000

==== Second Round ====
19 October 1983 2	PSV Eindhoven (Netherlands)	1–2	(England) Nottingham Forest	Eindhoven
	Jurrie Koolhof 84' (pen.)		84' Peter Davenport; 90' (pen.) Colin Walsh	Stadium: Philips Stadion; Attendance: 28,000

2 November 1983 2	Nottingham Forest (England)	1–0 (3–1 agg.)	(Netherlands) PSV Eindhoven	Nottingham
	Peter Davenport 56'			Stadium: City Ground; Attendance: 16,943

==== Third Round ====
23 November 1983 Eightfinals	Nottingham Forest (England)	0–0	(Scotland) Celtic Glasgow	Nottingham
				Stadium: City Ground; Attendance: 32,017

7 December 1983 Eightfinals	Celtic Glasgow (Scotland)	1–2 (1–2 agg.)	(England) Nottingham Forest	Glasgow
	Murdo MacLeod 79'		53' Steve Hodge; 72' Colin Walsh	Attendance: 66,938

==== Quarter finals ====
7 March 1984 1st leg	Nottingham Forest (England)	1–0	(Austria) Sturm Graz	Nottingham
	Paul Hart 70'			Stadium: City Ground; Attendance: 19,459

21 March 1984 2nd leg	Sturm Graz (Austria)	1–1 (a.e.t.) (1–2 agg.)	(England) Nottingham Forest
	Bozo Bakota 44' (pen.)		115' (pen.) Colin Walsh	Attendance: 21,000

==== Semi finals ====
11 April 1984 1st leg	Nottingham Forest (England)	2–0	(Belgium) RSC Anderlecht
	Steve Hodge 84', 87'			Attendance: 22,681

25 April 1984 2nd leg	RSC Anderlecht (Belgium)	3–0 (3–2 agg.)	(England) Nottingham Forest
	Enzo Scifo 18'; Kenneth Brylle-Larsen 59' (pen.); Erwin Wandenbergh 88'			Attendance: 36,000

=== League Cup ===
4 October 1983 2	Wimbledon	2–0	Nottingham Forest

26 October 1983 2	Nottingham Forest	1–1	Wimbledon	Nottingham
				Stadium: City Ground

=== FA Cup ===
7 January 1984 3	Nottingham Forest	1–2	Southampton	Nottingham
				Stadium: City Ground

== Statistics ==
=== Squad statistics ===
No.	Pos	Nat	Player	Total		Football League Division One		FA Cup		Other	
No.	Pos	Nat	Player	Apps	Goals	Apps	Goals	Apps	Goals	Apps	Goals
	GK	(Netherlands) NED	Hans van Breukelen	46	0	36	0	1	0	9	0
	DF	(England) ENG	Viv Anderson	53	6	40	6	1	0	12	0
	DF	(England) ENG	Chris Fairclough	41	0	31	0	1	0	7+2	0
	DF	(England) ENG	Paul Hart	48	2	36	0	1	1	11	1
	DF	(England) ENG	Kenny Swain	54	1	41	1	1	0	12	0
	MF	(England) ENG	Steve Wigley	47	1	27+8	1	1	0	11	0
	MF	(England) ENG	Ian Bowyer	55	7	42	6	1	0	12	1
	MF	(Scotland) SCO	Colin Walsh	51	16	35+3	13	1	0	11+1	3
	MF	(England) ENG	Steve Hodge	52	14	39	10	1	0	12	4
	FW	(England) ENG	Garry Birtles	43	15	33+1	15	1	0	6+2	0
	FW	(England) ENG	Peter Davenport	45	17	32+1	15	1	0	10+1	2
	GK	(England) ENG	Steve Sutton	9	0	6	0	0	0	3	0
	FW	(Scotland) SCO	Ian Wallace	35	5	22+5	3	0+1	0	6+1	2
	MF	(Netherlands) NED	Frans Thijssen	19	3	17	3	0	0	2	0
	DF	(England) ENG	Colin Todd	19	0	13	0	0	0	6	0
	MF	(England) ENG	Gary Mills	9	0	5+2	0	0	0	2	0
	DF	(England) ENG	Bryn Gunn	7	0	4	0	0	0	0+3	0
	DF	(England) ENG	Des Walker	4	0	3+1	0	0	0	0	0
	DF	(England) ENG	Mark Smalley	1	0	0+1	0	0	0	0	0
	FW	(England) ENG	David Riley	1	0	0+1	0	0	0	0	0
	MF	(Northern Ireland) NIR	Danny Wilson	1	0	0	0	0	0	0+1	0
	FW	(England) ENG	Shaun Finney	0	0	0	0	0	0	0	0
	GK	(England) ENG	Kevin Hitchcock	0	0	0	0	0	0	0	0
	DF	(England) ENG	Nigel Johnson	0	0	0	0	0	0	0	0
	FW	(England) ENG	David Longhurst	0	0	0	0	0	0	0	0
	DF	(England) ENG	Les Robinson	0	0	0	0	0	0	0	0
	MF	(England) ENG	Adrian Shaw	0	0	0	0	0	0	0	0

- Source: https://www.11v11.com/teams/nottingham-forest/tab/players/season/1984/
