= Dwayne Sandy =

Saint Vincent and the Grenadines footballer (1989–2021)

Personal information
- Full name: Dwayne Sandy
- Date of birth: February 19, 1989
- Place of birth: Kingstown, St. Vincent
- Date of death: May 21, 2021 (aged 32)
- Place of death: Calliaqua, St. Vincent
- Height: 6 ft 5 in (1.96 m)
- Position: Goalkeeper

Youth career
- 2004–2008: Pastures United FC

Senior career*
Years	Team	Apps	(Gls)
2004–2008	Pastures United FC	22	(0)
2008–	Caledonia AIA	5	(0)
2009	→ Avenues United FC (loan)	11	(0)
2010	Avenues United FC	11	(0)

International career
2006–2009	Saint Vincent and the Grenadines U-20	10	(0)
2006	Saint Vincent and the Grenadines U-23	1	(0)
2007–2021	Saint Vincent and the Grenadines	27	(0)
- * Club domestic league appearances and goals

Dwayne Sandy (19 February 1989 – 21 May 2021) was a football player for the Saint Vincent and the Grenadines national football team.

Sandy was killed on 21 May 2021.

== Honors ==
- NLA Premier League Goalkeeper Of The Year: 2010–11
