= Zidane Sam =

Saint Vincent and the Grenadines footballer

Personal information
- Date of birth: 24 July 1998 (age 28)
- Place of birth: St. Vincent and the Grenadines
- Position: Forward

Team information
- Current team: JeBelle

Senior career*
Years	Team	Apps	(Gls)
2018–2020	Greggs		(21)
2020–	JeBelle		

International career^{‡}
2021–	Saint Vincent and the Grenadines	3	(1)
- * Club domestic league appearances and goals ‡ National team caps and goals as of 24 July 2026

Zidane Sam (born 24 July 1998) is a Vincentian professional footballer who plays for JeBelle and the Saint Vincent and the Grenadines national team.

== Club career ==
Sam was the top scorer of the 2019–20 SVGFF Premier Division season with Greggs FC, scoring 21 league goals. However, the team was relegated to the SVGFF First Division at the end of the year.

== International career ==
He debuted internationally on 25 March 2021 in a 2022 FIFA World Cup qualifying match against Curaçao, replacing Kamol Bess in the 5–0 defeat.

On 30 March 2021, Sam scored his first goal for Saint Vincent and the Grenadines against the British Virgin Islands in a 3–0 victory.

== Career statistics ==
=== International ===
As of match played 4 June 2021

Appearances and goals by national team and year
National team	Year	Apps	Goals
Saint Vincent and the Grenadines	2021	3	1
Total		3	1

Scores and results list Saint Vincent and the Grenadines' goal tally first, score column indicates score after each Sam goal.

List of international goals scored by Zidane Sam
No.	Date	Venue	Opponent	Score	Result	Competition
1	30 March 2021	Ergilio Hato Stadium, Willemstad, Curaçao	British Virgin Islands	2–0	3–0	2022 FIFA World Cup qualification

== Honours ==
=== Individual ===
- SVGFF Premier Division top scorer: 2019–20
