= Kendale Mercury =

Vincentian football coach (born 1970)

Personal information
- Full name: Kendale Murcury
- Date of birth: 1 January 1970 (age 56)
- Place of birth: Bequia, Saint Vincent and the Grenadines

Managerial career
- Years: Team
- 2007–2008: Village United
- Saint Vincent and the Grenadines U-20
- 2009: Saint Vincent and the Grenadines (interim)
- Saint Vincent and the Grenadines Women
- 2010: System 3
- Village United
- Bequia United
- 2018–2023: Saint Vincent and the Grenadines
- 2026–: Saint Vincent and the Grenadines U-17

Kendale Mercury (born 1 January 1970) is a Vincentian football coach, formerly manager of Saint Vincent and the Grenadines national team.

== Coaching career ==
In September 2009, Mercury was interim manager of Saint Vincent and the Grenadines for a 1–1 draw against Saint Kitts and Nevis. In 2010, Mercury was appointed manager of System 3. Following his stint at System 3, Mercury managed Village United and Bequia United.

In December 2018, Mercury was appointed manager of Saint Vincent and the Grenadines.

== Managerial statistics ==
As of Match played 27 March 2023

Team	From	To	Record				
Team	From	To	G	W	D	L	Win %
Saint Vincent and the Grenadines	December 2018	January 2023	26	9	6	11	34.62
