= Roy Richards =

Saint Vincent and the Grenadines footballer

Personal information
- Full name: Roy Rohan Richards
- Date of birth: 24 November 1983
- Place of birth: Barrouallie, Saint Vincent and the Grenadines
- Date of death: 8 July 2017 (aged 33)
- Place of death: Kingstown, Saint Vincent and the Grenadines
- Height: 1.85 m (6 ft 1 in)
- Position: Defender

Senior career*
| Years | Team | Apps | (Gls) |
| 2009–2011 | Tobago United | | |
| 2011–2015 | Pastures United | | |
| 2015–2017 | Rendezvous | | |

International career
| 2008–2016 | Saint Vincent and the Grenadines | 55 | (1) |
- * Club domestic league appearances and goals

Roy Rohan Richards (24 November 1983 – 8 July 2017) was a footballer who played for the Saint Vincent and the Grenadines national football team.

== Club career ==
Richards played club football for Tobago United, Pastures United and Rendezvous.

== International career ==
Richards made his international debut against Jamaica in June 2008. His first and only international goal was against British Virgin Islands in a 6–0 victory in September 2014. His final game was against United States in a 2018 FIFA World Cup qualifying game during September 2016.

== Death ==
Richards was shot at a shop in Barrouallie on 8 July 2017. He was taken to a Kingstown hospital, where he later died.
