= Zodiac FC =

- Full name: Zodiac Football Club
- Nickname(s): Zodiac
- Founded: 1999

Zodiac FC is a football club from Port Elizabeth, Saint Vincent and the Grenadines. Founded in 1999 on the island of Bequia, it remains one of the only football clubs in the Grenadines. The club currently plays in the NLA Premier League, Saint Vincent and the Grenadines highest football league.
