= Saint Vincent and the Grenadines national under-20 football team =

Saint Vincent and the Grenadines Under 20
- Nickname: Vincy Heat
- Association: Saint Vincent and the Grenadines; Football Federation
- Confederation: CONCACAF (North America)
- Head coach: Wade Jackson
- Captain: Dwayne Sandy
- Most caps: Cornelius Stewart (14)
- Top scorer: Cornelius Stewart (13)
- FIFA code: VIN
First colours	Second colours

First international
- Suriname 2–0 Saint Vincent and the Grenadines (Suriname; 22 November 2001)

Biggest win
- Saint Vincent and the Grenadines 23–1 British Virgin Islands (St. George's, Grenada; 16 May 2008)

Biggest defeat
- Saint Vincent and the Grenadines 0–6 United States (Bradenton, United States; 7 November 2018)

The Saint Vincent and the Grenadines national U-20 football team is the national youth association football team of Saint Vincent and the Grenadines. As of October 2025, the head coach was Ezra Hendrickson.

== Notable players ==
- Romano Snagg
- Quillian Tash
- Dwayne Sandy
- Cornelius Stewart
- Myron Samuel

== Current squad ==
No.	Pos.	Player	Date of birth (age)	Caps	Goals	Club
	GK	Dwayne Sandy(Captain)		10	0	(Trinidad and Tobago Football Association) Caledonia AIA
	DF	Jolanshoy McDowall	August 1989 (age 19 )	12	0	(Saint Vincent and the Grenadines Football Federation) Avenues FC
	DF	Shorn Lowman		3	1	
	DF	Kiko Lorraine		0	0	
	DF	Justin Stapleton		1	0	
	DF	Devon Holder		1	0	
	DF	Shemol Trimmingham	December 22, 1989 (age 36)	3	0	(Saint Vincent and the Grenadines Football Federation) System 3
	MF	Reginald Richards		3	3	
	MF	Antonio Douglas		4	1	(Saint Vincent and the Grenadines Football Federation) System 3
	MF	Carlos Talbot		1	0	(The Football Association) Bromley F.C.
	MF	Chad Balcombe		3	2	
	MF	Cornelius Stewart	October 7, 1989 (age 36)	10	10	(Saint Vincent and the Grenadines Football Federation) Hope International
	MF	Derren Hamlett		6	1	VIN
	MF	Ronsil Badnock		3	0	
	MF	Devon Browne		3	3	
	FW	Wendell Cuffy		3	0	
	FW	Renaldo Roberts		1	0	
	FW	Kurtlan Williams		6	4	
	FW	Myron Samuel		10	4	(Saint Vincent and the Grenadines Football Federation)
