= Brownstown United FC =

Brownstown United F.C.
- Full name: Brownstown United Football Club
- Nickname(s): Most Wanted
- Founded: 1993 (re-established in 2006)
- Ground: Chili Playing Field
- League: NLA First Division Club Championship
- 2009: 10th

Brownstown United F.C. is a football club from Georgetown in St Vincent and the Grenadines. The club currently play in the NLA First Division Club Championship.

== History ==
The Brownstown United Football Club was founded in 1993. Because of the lack of youth players being able to form the integral part of the team and a lack of finance, the team was forced to rebuild and re-establish in 2006. The re-establishment of the team is the brain work of Bradley Ollivierre, Rolando Lewis, Kelvin Scott and Deryl Herbert. In 2006 the team entered the local tournament, with the players from the youth team now forming the basis of the squad. The team made it to the championship game, coming back from two goals down to win it 3–2 against the unique warriors. In the 2007–2008 season the club made it to the final again, but this time failed to come back from three goals down and lost 2–3 to the Carib Pearl Warriors. The club qualified for the national club championship as a result of finishing runners-up; however, qualification didn't go so well, with the team losing 3–1 against Richland Park Pride and Joy, 6–1 to Campdonia Chelsea and 2–1 to Avenues United FC and was placed in the first division as a result. In its first season of the national league, the club finish sixth place. In 2007 the youth team was also re-established, with some of them playing a vital role in the first team.

== Current squad ==
Note: Flags indicate national team as defined under FIFA eligibility rules; some limited exceptions apply. Players may hold more than one non-FIFA nationality.

No.	Pos.	Nation	Player
1	GK	(Saint Vincent and the Grenadines) VIN	Theron Tommy
2	MF	(Saint Vincent and the Grenadines) VIN	Devon Burke
5	FW	(Saint Vincent and the Grenadines) VIN	Steven Charles
6	DF	(Saint Vincent and the Grenadines) VIN	Damian Lorraine
7	MF	(Saint Vincent and the Grenadines) VIN	Bradley Ollivierre
8	DF	(Saint Vincent and the Grenadines) VIN	Jovan Shallow
9	FW	(Saint Vincent and the Grenadines) VIN	Jevorn Charles
10	MF	(Saint Vincent and the Grenadines) VIN	Brenton Charles
11	MF	(Saint Vincent and the Grenadines) VIN	Eustan Duncan
12	GK	(Saint Vincent and the Grenadines) VIN	Rolando Luis
13	FW	(Saint Vincent and the Grenadines) VIN	Gerron Texeira

No.	Pos.	Nation	Player
14	DF	(Saint Vincent and the Grenadines) VIN	Ivan Clarke
16	DF	(Saint Vincent and the Grenadines) VIN	Kelroy Adams
18	DF	(Saint Vincent and the Grenadines) VIN	Akeme Ryan
19	MF	(Saint Vincent and the Grenadines) VIN	Jamal Spring
20	DF	(Saint Vincent and the Grenadines) VIN	Rodale Yearwood
23	FW	(Saint Vincent and the Grenadines) VIN	Anjay Williams
32	MF	(Saint Vincent and the Grenadines) VIN	Daryll Billy
47	MF	(Saint Vincent and the Grenadines) VIN	Caville Williams
77	FW	(Saint Vincent and the Grenadines) VIN	Niall Joseph

== Achievements ==
- NCB North East Football League: 1

2006/2007

- SVGFF CUP: Runners up

2010
