= SVGFF First Division =

- Country: Saint Vincent and the Grenadines
- Confederation: CONCACAF
- Number of clubs: 12
- Level on pyramid: 2
- Promotion to: SVGFF Premier Division
- Relegation to: SVGFF Second Division
- Current champions: SV United FC (2022/2023)
- Website: https://svgff.org/

The First Division is the second-tier league of football in Saint Vincent and the Grenadines. It is organized by the Saint Vincent and the Grenadines Football Federation, under the National Club Championships umbrella. Each year, the league winners are promoted to the SVGFF Premier Division. The league features twelve clubs.

== List of winners ==
Season	Champions	Runners-up	Ref.
2017	North Leeward Predators	Largo Height FC	
2018/2019	Awesome FC	Greiggs FC	
2019/2020	Layou FC	Largo Height FC	
2020/21	Cancelled because of the COVID-19 pandemic		
2021/22	Cancelled because of the COVID-19 pandemic		
2022/23	SV United FC	Camdonia Chelsea FC	
2023/24			
