= Nigel Johnson (footballer) =

English footballer

Personal information
- Date of birth: 23 June 1964 (age 62)
- Place of birth: Rotherham, England
- Height: 6 ft 2 in (1.88 m)
- Position: Defender

Senior career*
Years	Team	Apps	(Gls)
1982–1985	Rotherham United	89	(1)
1985–1986	Manchester City	4	(0)
1987–1993	Rotherham United	175	(9)
Total		268	(10)
- * Club domestic league appearances and goals

Nigel Johnson (born 23 June 1964) is an English former footballer who played in the Football League for Rotherham United and Manchester City.

== Honours ==
Rotherham United

- Football League Fourth Division: 1988–89
