= Tryum F.C. =

Association football club in Antigua and Barbuda

Tryum FC
- Full name: Tryum Football Club
- Founded: 1976
- Ground: Antigua Recreation Ground; St John's, Antigua and Barbuda
- League: First Division (II)
- 2024–25: 10th
Home colours	Away colours

Tryum FC is an Antiguan professional football club based in St John's. The club plays in the Antigua and Barbuda Premier Division, ABFA, the top tier of Antiguan football. The club is based in the community of Cashew Hill.

== Tryum Genesis ==
Since their inception, Tryum has been elevated to the premier division on three occasions. The first in 1984 where they spent two seasons. This was the 1st Generation of Tryum players, the foundation members, who came up with that unforgettable team name while securing the Harney Motors sponsorship. These players included Cecil "Jabbi" Christopher, Wangi, Ordin Glasgow, Fitzroy Kaza, Duga Matthew and many more.

The second time Tryum got promoted from Division One was in 1996. This team had a great combination of both young players and a few of the foundation members, (Jabbi and Wangi) but their time spent in the top tier was cut short as they were relegated the very same season. The 2nd Generation included notable players like Steveroy "Tito" Crump, Leon Moses Sr., Alfredo Allen, Mario and Ovrid Santiago, Wayne Galloway, Mark Richards and Saintclaire "Nashie" Christian and Benny Hodge.

During this same era, Tryum's youth team dominated at the U-19 level, winning the 95/96 Championship with players like Jason "Herring" Samuel, Alphaeus Tonge, Eric Browne, Andy "Paper" James, Seon Sam, Ateba "Jaja Willie" Merrick, Mathias Grigg and Sean "Chiney-man" Braithwaite. Even though the U-19's were a gifted bunch, they never quite managed to stay together as most of the members dispersed to different clubs. This was the 3rd Generation of Tryum.

The third appearance came two decades later in the 2016–2017 season where Tryum came face to face with the top teams in the land and survived with a 7th-placed finish. The following season 2017–2018 they showed much more improvement and stepped up their position to 5th place in the standings.

== Hitting rock bottom ==
Since falling from top flight in 1996, Tryum struggled for almost a decade in the First Division. The interest was lost and the club structure was weakened. From about 2005 -2009 Tryum began recording a series of embarrassing defeats including scorelines as high as 15–0. A combination of poor performance and lack of interest by players lead to a forfeit in the league halfway through the 2006 season. Tryum found themselves relegated to the Second Division, the lowest tier of the ABFA Men's Senior League.

== New executives ==
Several notable attempts were made to get the team back on track. In 2012, Leon Moses Sr., Steveroy "Tito" Crump and Quincy Stowe, teamed up with Constituency Representative Chester Hughes to bring back some life into the team. Hughes used his connections to bring new sponsors Ayoushe Beauty Supply. At the end of that season the results were as follows: 6 Wins, 7 Draws, 7 Losses and 25 points. Position in league 13th.

By this time Tryum was fielded by its 5th Generation of core players but it wasn't until April 2013 when the resurgence took full effect. Under the leadership of Keithroy Black Sr., a new executive body was formed led by manager Patrick Wallcott.

Tryum also published own website and Facebook page. Leon Moses Jr. amassed a total of 23 goals and helped Tryum obtain a 4th-place finish from 24 teams. Tryum, Golden Grove and Sea View Farm ended up in the playoffs. Farm was victorious over both opponents. Tryum remained in the 2nd Division for yet another season along with Golden Grove FC who finished 3rd.

== Division 2: 2014–2015 ==
=== Historical events ===
Tryum opened their 2014-2015 campaign to a record-breaking 6-0 win over Wings FC in the ABFA Division 2 (Zone A) competition. 44-year-old Benny "Nambu" Hodge recorded his 433rd cap for the club after some 23 years and counting. Star striker Leon Moses Jr. notched up a hat-trick plus one in his chase to surpass last season's tally of 23 goals.

A historic moment for the club as the team trained for the first time under lights. With the assistance of elected MP, Molwyn Joseph, nine pairs of flood lights were installed prior to the 2014 elections in June.

However it was the initial efforts of former player, Wayne Galloway, also with the APUA Department and finally Rasta Man "Kentae" who worked diligently to complete the lighting process on September 9.

Tryum suffer their first defeat after 21 matches.

The last time the Harney Motors Tryum lost a match was against Pares FC on January 15, 2014. Since then the club had gone on to win 21 consecutive matches, 7 last season(2013 -2014) and 14 this season (2014-2015).

On February 13, 2015, a win over Villa would have seen us lift the Zone-A trophy, however, the battle between the #1 and #2 teams ended in a 0–0 draw which left Tryum on 59 points and Villa on 57 points with an extra game left for Villa to play. Subsequently, they won that game which took them on to 60 points and victors of the 2nd Division and Tryum finishing 2nd.

The result meant that Tryum would have to feature in the play-offs against Swetes FC and English Harbor FC. Tryum defeated both teams, 1–0 and 5–1 respectively. Tyrum was finally promoted from Division 2 to Division 1.

Guided by coach Leon Moses Sr., Tryums record for the 2014-2015 season: 19 Wins, 2 Draws, 1 Loss, 59 Points, 90 Goals Scored, 2nd Place. Gavin Williams beat Leon Moses Jr. for Tryum's Golden Booth Player of the year award with 21 goals to 19.

== Division 1: 2015–2016 ==
Within the next 4 days hundreds of fans gathered together at the Tryum Playfield for the most anticipated climax of the season.

In their first encounter Liberta defeated Tryum 1–0 at home. Since then Tryum has grown to become one of this seasons favorite competitors with a total of 12 victories 7 draws and 2 defeats.

Having just been promoted from the 2nd Division last season, Liberta SC and Lion Hill FC were the only two teams able to beat Tryum.

With respects to Liberta, regardless of the outcome they have already claimed the 1st-place position and Championship Title with a total of 47 points from 21 matches. Tryum on the other hand, have 43 points and will be satisfied with any result other than defeat, to claim the second place spot for automatic promotion.

A positive end result will see the return of the Cashew Hill-based team after 20 years in the wilderness, back in the Premier League.

Last week's encounter saw them dominate Glanvilles FC in a 3-1 finish.

Leon Moses Jr. scored a brace within 5 minutes of the second half while Danio Myers made it 3–0 in the latter part just before Glanville's returned fire with a consolation goal.

Tryum ends the season with a promotional 2–1 victory over Liberta FC. Their overall record for the 2015-2016 Season stands at 13 Wins, 7 Draws, 2 Defeats, 46 Points, 2nd place.
