= Adrian Shaw (footballer) =

English footballer and coach (born 1966)

Personal information
- Full name: Adrian Shaw
- Date of birth: 13 April 1966 (age 60)
- Place of birth: Murton, England
- Height: 5 ft 9 in (1.75 m)
- Position: Defender

Youth career
- ?–1983: Nottingham Forest

Senior career*
| Years | Team | Apps | (Gls) |
| 1983–1985 | Nottingham Forest | 0 | (0) |
| 1984–1985 | → Halifax Town (loan) | 10 | (0) |
| 1985–1988 | Halifax Town | 90 | (1) |
| 1988 | Bridlington Town | ? | (?) |
| 1988 | York City | 5 | (0) |
| 1988–1990 | Chesterfield | 50 | (3) |
| 1990–? | Gainsborough Trinity | ? | (?) |
| Total | | 155 | (4) |

Managerial career
- 2004: Saint Vincent and the Grenadines
- * Club domestic league appearances and goals

Adrian Shaw (born 30 April 1966) is an English football coach and former player.

== Playing career ==
Born in Murton, County Durham, Shaw played for Murton Juniors before joining Nottingham Forest as an apprentice. He signed a professional contract with the club in December 1983 and was loaned to Halifax Town in December 1984. He made 10 appearances before the loan expired in March 1985, signing for the club permanently later that month. Shaw was released by Halifax in May 1988 and after a few weeks with Bridlington Town in non-League football signed for Fourth Division York City in October on a trial basis. His debut came in a 1–1 draw at home to Doncaster Rovers on 25 October, making six appearances for the club before being released. He joined Chesterfield in December, where he made 50 league appearances and scored three goals before a serious groin injury forced his retirement from professional football. Shaw returned to non-League football to finish his playing career with Gainsborough Trinity.

== Coaching career ==
After retiring as a player, Shaw organised a football in the community scheme in Lincolnshire. He moved into coaching at Lincoln City as football in the community officer, before returning to Chesterfield as a coach. He returned to another former club, York, as youth team coach, before being promoted to first team coach. Shaw was Terry Dolan's assistant manager at York, until the pair were sacked by the club on 31 May 2003. He had a spell as manager of the Saint Vincent and the Grenadines national side in 2004.
