= Layou FC =

Layou Football Club
- Full name: Layou Football Club
- Nickname: Layou FC
- Founded: 2010
- Ground: Layou Playing Field
- Chairman: (Saint Vincent and the Grenadines) Wayde Jackson
- Manager: (Saint Vincent and the Grenadines) Wayde Jackson
- League: NLA Premier League
- 2026: 2nd
Home colours

Layou Football Club is a football club in Layou, St Vincent and the Grenadines. They currently play in the NLA Premier League.

== History ==
Layou FC was founded in 2010 in New York City by natives of Layou. The club has recently become a well known force in Vincentian football by winning the ALL Leewards Football Competition and becoming runners up in the 2012 Saint Vincent and the Grenadines Football Federation (SVGFF) Inter-League Championship.
