= Football in Saint Vincent and the Grenadines =

- Country: Saint Vincent and the Grenadines
- National team: men's national team women's national team

International competitions
- CONCACAF Champions League; CONCACAF League; Caribbean Club Shield; FIFA Club World Cup; CONCACAF Gold Cup (National Team); CONCACAF Nations League (National Team); FIFA World Cup (National Team)

The sport of association football in the country of Saint Vincent and the Grenadines is run by the Saint Vincent and the Grenadines Football Federation. The association administers the national football team, as well as the NLA Premier League. Cricket is the most popular sport in the country, followed by association football.

== Football stadiums in St. Vincent and the Grenadines ==
Stadium	Capacity	City	Image
Arnos Vale Stadium	18,000	Arnos Vale	

== Federation's Competitions ==
- SVGFF Premier Division
- SVGFF First Division
- SVGFF Second Division

== See also ==
- Lists of stadiums
