= Sion Hill FC =

Sion Hill
- Full name: Sion Hill Football Club
- Nickname: The Lions
- Founded: 1975
- League: NLA Premier League
- 2024–25: 9th

Sion Hill FC is a Vincentian professional football club based in Sion Hill neighborhood of Arnos Vale. The club finished second in 2016.

== Squad ==
Note: Flags indicate national team as defined under FIFA eligibility rules; some limited exceptions apply. Players may hold more than one non-FIFA nationality.

| No. | Pos. | Nation | Player |
|---|---|---|---|
| 1 | GK | VIN | Kevon Jacobs |
| 32 | GK | VIN | Jellando John |
| 3 | DF | VIN | Jason Richards |
| 4 | DF | VIN | Akeel Jack |
| 12 | DF | VIN | Adamo Johnson |
| 18 | DF | VIN | Jamal Yorke |
| 21 | DF | VIN | Damian Fernandez |
| 25 | DF | VIN | Akeeni Roberts |
| — | DF | VIN | Shavis Trimmingham |
| 5 | MF | VIN | Adonal Ferdinand |
| 8 | MF | VIN | Tyreese Dickson |
| 30 | MF | VIN | Delron Sandy |
| — | MF | VIN | Rohan Thomas |
| — | MF | VIN | Romario Wales |
| — | MF | VIN | Tevin Gloster |
| — | MF | VIN | Reginald Lewis |
| 2 | FW | VIN | Jesse Edwards |
| 7 | FW | VIN | Dorian Dallaway |
| 10 | FW | BRA | Carlos Machado |
| 17 | FW | VIN | Malik Ferdinand |

| No. | Pos. | Nation | Player |
|---|---|---|---|
| 24 | FW | VIN | Zenroy Lee |
| 26 | FW | VIN | Matthew Jackson |
| 27 | FW | VIN | Denzel Bascombe |
| 9 | FW | VIN | Delano Webb |
| 11 | FW | VIN | Christophe Harris |
| 13 | FW | VIN | Jaquan Francis |
| 14 | FW | VIN | Shaquille Chandler |
| 15 | FW | VIN | Geovanni Bascombe |
| 19 | FW | VIN | Delroy Cyrus |
| 23 | FW | VIN | Dexter John |
| 29 | FW | VIN | Sean Weekes |
| — | FW | VIN | Karanji Alexander |
| — | FW | VIN | Omar Cupid |
| 6 | FW | NGR | Emmanuel Ogbonnaya |
