= Bequia United FC =

Bequia United
- Full name: Bequia United Football Club
- Founded: 2012
- Ground: Clive Tannis Playing Field, Port Elizabeth
- Capacity: 500

Bequia United Football Club is a Vincentian football club from Port Elizabeth, Saint Vincent and the Grenadines. The club plays in the NLA Premier League, the highest tier of football in Saint Vincent and the Grenadines.

== Managerial history ==
Kendale Mercury
