= Avenues United FC =

Saint Vincent and the Grenadines football club

- Full name: Avenues United Football Club
- Founded: 1974
- Ground: Victoria Park
- Capacity: 3,500
- League: NLA Premier League
- 2026: 10th

Avenues United is a professional football club from Kingstown, St Vincent and the Grenadines. They currently play in the NLA Premier League.

== History ==
Originally from Paul's Avenue in Kingstown, Avenues United is one of the oldest football clubs in St. Vincent having roots dating back to 1965. Avenues United won the inaugural Saint Vincent and the Grenadines National Championship now called the NLA Premier League. Having won the league, Avenues United subsequently qualified alongside System 3 FC for the 2010 CFU Club Championship. At this Championship, they reached the second round eventually losing both of their matches to Walking Boys of Suriname and Joe Public F.C.

== Squad ==
Note: Flags indicate national team as defined under FIFA eligibility rules; some limited exceptions apply. Players may hold more than one non-FIFA nationality.

No.	Pos.	Nation	Player
1	GK	VIN	Dwayne Sandy
4	DF	VIN	Shawn Lowman
5	DF	VIN	Geroni Peters
6	DF	VIN	Jolanshoy McDowall
7	MF	VIN	Benford Joseph
8	MF	VIN	Steven Henry
9	MF	VIN	Richard Hayde
10	FW	VIN	Myron Samuel
11	FW	VIN	Lamont Hector
13	FW	VIN	Damal Francis (Captain)

No.	Pos.	Nation	Player
15	MF	VIN	Emerald George
17	FW	VIN	Romano Snagg
18	DF	VIN	Keith James
19	MF	VIN	Sean James
21	MF	VIN	Darren Francis
—	DF	VIN	Nicholas Williams
—	MF	COD	David Mbele
—	MF	VIN	Keron Hadaway

== Achievements ==
- NLA Premier League
  - Champions (4): 2009–10, 2010–11, 2017, 2018.

== Performance in CFU competitions ==
- CFU Club Championship: 1 appearance

2010 – Second Round
