= Camdonia Chelsea SC =

Football club in St Vincent and the Grenadines

- Full name: Camdonia Chelsea Sports Club
- Nickname: Chelsea
- Founded: 1985
- Ground: Campden Park Playing Field
- Capacity: 2,000
- Chairman: Royran Raffian
- Manager: Kenson Wilson
- League: SVGFF Premier Division
- 2026: 6th
Home colours	Away colours

Camdonia Chelsea SC is a football club in St Vincent and the Grenadines. They currently play in the National Club Championship Premier Division. The club hails from the town of Campden Park in Saint Andrew Parish.

== Squad ==
Note: Flags indicate national team as defined under FIFA eligibility rules; some limited exceptions apply. Players may hold more than one non-FIFA nationality.

No.	Pos.	Nation	Player
—	GK	VIN	Delanie Quow
1	GK	VIN	Kshorn Browne
20	DF	VIN	Nigel Charles
2	DF	VIN	NTini Delpeshe
4	DF	VIN	Rayshawn Warren
—	DF	VIN	Ashwin Richards
5	DF	VIN	Zeron Murray
27	DF	VIN	Terrance Maxwell
21	DF	VIN	Kijuan Nimblett
—	DF	VIN	Kimron Davis
3	MF	VIN	Jermaine Spencer

No.	Pos.	Nation	Player
—	MF	VIN	Kosharie Lewis
—	MF	VIN	Imani Miller
—	MF	VIN	Jumar Luke
17	MF	VIN	Ronaldo Williams
—	MF	VIN	Kawanza Phillips
10	FW	VIN	Nazir McBurnett
—	FW	VIN	Keron Pitt
19	FW	VIN	Duane Murray
—	FW	VIN	Fernando Daniel
—	FW	VIN	Tevin Slater
—	FW	VIN	Oldrick Francios
—	FW	VIN	Khayle Nero
—	DF	VIN	Shemar Gibson
—	GK	VIN	Kesroy Bowens
—		VIN	
—			
—			
—			

== Achievements ==
- NLA Premier League: 4

2009/2010 – 2010/11., 2017, 2018.

== Achievements ==
- Saint Vincent and the Grenadines Football Championship: 1

1999

- CFU Club Championship: 1 appearance

1999 – First Round
