= North Leeward Predators FC =

- Full name: North Leeward Predators FC
- Nickname: Predators
- Founded: 2007
- Ground: Goolin Playing Field
- League: NLA Premier League
- 2026: 4th

North Leeward Predators is a professional football club from Chateaubelair in St Vincent and the Grenadines. The club currently plays in the SVGFF Premier Division.

== Squad ==
Note: Flags indicate national team as defined under FIFA eligibility rules; some limited exceptions apply. Players may hold more than one non-FIFA nationality.

No.	Pos.	Nation	Player
1	GK	VIN	Rogderinio Kendall
23	GK	VIN	Denzil Cyclon
2	DF	VIN	Sandin Waterman
3	DF	VIN	Eleuterius Brown
4	DF	VIN	Robinson Mississipi
6	DF	VIN	Acquarius Leatherman
13	DF	VIN	Isaiah Browning
14	DF	VIN	Kevinio Southwood
15	DF	VIN	Djeferson Brooks
21	DF	VIN	Vinnie Gayle
5	MF	VIN	Julius Neverland
7	MF	VIN	Desmond Phineas
8	MF	VIN	JoJohnny Usher
12	MF	VIN	Acacius Gavin
19	MF	VIN	Godfrey Elijah
26	MF	VIN	Hal Courtney

No.	Pos.	Nation	Player
—	MF	VIN	Bryan Alsace
—	MF	VIN	Cleophas Michigan
10	FW	VIN	Marcellus McLean
20	FW	VIN	Benjamyn Hutchinson
22	FW	VIN	Windell Pilkay
24	FW	VIN	Ritchard Corry
27	FW	VIN	Joel Gisler
17	FW	VIN	Sheldon Windsor
18	FW	VIN	Marlon Caroline
24	FW	VIN	Boy Vincentin
27	FW	VIN	Ednus Phoebe
38	FW	VIN	Zachariah Kelly
40	FW	VIN	Madiba Keithwood
41	FW	VIN	Gaius Belmont
—	FW	VIN	Gennarius Manchester
