= Hope International FC =

- Full name: Nemwill Hope International Football Club
- Nickname: Hope
- Founded: 1995; 31 years ago
- Ground: Victoria Park
- Capacity: 3,500
- Chairman: (Saint Vincent and the Grenadines) Roddy Dowels
- Manager: (Saint Vincent and the Grenadines) Kamara Doyle
- League: NLA Premier League
- 2026: 7th
Home colours	Away colours

Hope International FC is a professional football club based in Sion Hill Playing Field, St Vincent and the Grenadines. They currently play in the NLA Premier League. They finished third in the inaugural season of the Saint Vincent and the Grenadines National Championship, now the NLA Premier League. In the 2026 SVGFF Premier Division they finished 7th, with 19 PTS, -10 GD and 4 wins. Hope International FC is a top-tier SVGFF Premier Division club, and has most likely has never gotten relegated to the SVGFF First Division ever. They are 2nd in the most SVGFF Premier Division titles with 3 in total.Hope International is part of some few clubs in Saint Vincent to usually participate in the SVGFF Club Championship.

- Youth Team(s) (most likely not all)
  - Under-10
  - Under-14
- 2021 Caribbean Club Championship Group C Matches

Hope International 4 - 1 Olympique de Cayenne

Hope International 1 - 3 RKSV Scherpenheuvel

Hope International 1 - 2 Cavaly AS

== Current squad ==
Note: Flags indicate national team as defined under FIFA eligibility rules; some limited exceptions apply. Players may hold more than one non-FIFA nationality.

No.	Pos.	Nation	Player
1	GK	VIN	Sylvannus Baptiste
99	GK	VIN	Jovan Lynch
—	GK	VIN	Melvin Andrews
—	DF	VIN	Jason Hope
—	DF	VIN	Omarion Benn
—	DF	VIN	Cornelius Huggins
—	DF	VIN	Rodney Francois
—	MF	VIN	Darren Francis
—	MF	VIN	Path-Bert Joseph
3	DF	VIN	Joseph Douglas (Captain)
5		VIN	amuel Mathews

No.	Pos.	Nation	Player
8		VIN	Wendell Cuffy
10		VIN	Enrique Millington
17	FW	SRB	Darko Kazic
19		VIN	Jalen Miller
20		VIN	Ralique Bradshaw
26		VIN	Kevin Samuel
21	MF	VIN	Brad Richards
—	MF	VIN	Dwayne Dennie
—	MF	VIN	Reginald Douglas
27	FW	VIN	Rondell Thomas
—	FW	VIN	Nicholas Williams
25	FW	TJK	Ruslan Boboev

== Tournaments ==
  - SVGFF Premier Division
  - Caribbean Club Championship/CFU Club Shield
  - SVGFF Club Championship

== Achievements ==
- NLA Premier League
  - Champions (3): 2005-06, 2014, 2019-20
- Caribbean Club Championship Qualification
  - Group Stage (1) : 2021
