= Pastures FC =

Football club in Saint Vincent and the Grenadines

BESCO Pastures
- Full name: Pastures Football Club
- Nicknames: BESCO, Pastures
- Founded: 1972; 54 years ago
- Ground: Victoria Park, Kingstown
- Capacity: 3,500
- League: NLA Premier League
- 2026: 8th

Pastures FC (known as BESCO Pastures FC for sponsorship reasons, previously Pastures United F.C.) is a professional football club based in Layou, Saint Vincent and the Grenadines.

Having won the SVGFF First Division In 2009, they have been promoted to the NLA Premier League. The club hails from Buccament Bay, in the St. Patrick Parish.

== Squad ==
Note: Flags indicate national team as defined under FIFA eligibility rules; some limited exceptions apply. Players may hold more than one non-FIFA nationality.

No.	Pos.	Nation	Player
1	GK	VIN	Javed Matthews
30	GK	VIN	Nathaniel Carrington
4	DF	VIN	Lesron Craigg
15	DF	VIN	J'Maro Fraser
16	DF	VIN	Gadbert Boyce
18	DF	VIN	Meshac Pierre
22	DF	VIN	Augustus Adams
—	DF	VIN	Reginal Richardson
6	MF	VIN	Dillon Moore
7	MF	VIN	Hosni Chandler
14	MF	VIN	Ezra Alleyne
17	MF	VIN	Gidson Francis
21	MF	VIN	Jahva Audain
23	MF	VIN	Mazique Herbert

No.	Pos.	Nation	Player
39	MF	VIN	Terick Degrads
—	MF	VIN	Dorren Hamlett
9	FW	VIN	Attius Enville
19	FW	VIN	Kareem Wickham
20	FW	VIN	Dequan Springer
5		VIN	Shawn Hinds
6		VIN	Delano McDonald
11		VIN	Andre Robinson
12	FW	VIN	Jermine Cruickshank
—		VIN	Jomo Toppin
—		VIN	Curtis Cunningham
—		VIN	Aaron Adams
—		VIN	Joel Baptiste
—		VIN	Mozuro Mathews
