= SVGFF Premier Division =

- Founded: 2009
- Country: Saint Vincent and the Grenadines
- Confederation: CONCACAF
- Number of clubs: 12
- Level on pyramid: 1
- Relegation to: SVGFF First Division
- International cup: CFU Club Shield
- Current champions: System 3 FC (206)
- Broadcaster: SVG TV
- Sponsor: National Lottery Authorities
- Website: SVGFF
- Current: 2027 SVGFF Premier Division

SVGFF Premier Division is the top division league of football in Saint Vincent and the Grenadines. It is organized by the Saint Vincent and the Grenadines Football Federation, under the National Club Championships umbrella. The Premier League began in 2009 under the name NLA SVGFF Club Championship.

== Clubs ==
- Avenues United (Kingstown)
- Awesome FC
- Bluebirds FC
- Hope International
- Jebelle FC
- Largo Height FC
- North Leeward Predators
- Pastures United
- Sion Hill
- System 3

== List of champions ==
Champions so far are:

Ed.	Season	Champion
1	1998–99	Camdonia Chelsea
–	1999–2003	no competition
2	2003–04	Universal Mufflers Samba
3	2004–05	Universal Mufflers Samba
4	2005–06	Hope International
–	2006–07	Not held
5	2007–08	Apparently abandoned
–	2008–09	Not held
6	2009–10	Avenues United
7	2010–11	Avenues United
8	2012	Avenues United
9	2013–14	BESCO Pastures
10	2014	Hope International
–	2015	Not held
11	2016	System 3
12	2017	Avenues United
13	2018–19	BESCO Pastures
14	2019–20	Hope International
15	2020–21	Abandoned
–	2021–22	Not held
16	2022–23	Jebelle FC
–	2023–24	Not held
17	2024–25	North Leeward Predators
18	2026	System 3 FC

== Titles by club ==
Club	Titles	Seasons won
Avenues United FC	4	2009–10, 2010–11, 2012, 2017
Hope International FC	3	2005–06, 2014–15, 2019–20
Pastures United FC	2	2013–14, 2018–19
Universal Mufflers Samba^{†}	2	2003–04, 2004–05
North Leeward Predators	1	2024–25
Camdonia Chelsea SC	1	1998–99
Jebelle FC	1	2022–23
System 3 FC	1	2016

- ^{†} indicates clubs that no longer exist or disaffiliated.

== Top goalscorers ==
Season	Player	Team	Goals
2018–19	(Saint Vincent and the Grenadines) Chavel Cunningham	Pastures United	24
2019–20	(Saint Vincent and the Grenadines) Zidane Sam	Greiggs	21
2020–21	(Saint Vincent and the Grenadines) Raheem Westfield	Avenues United	8
2022–23	(Saint Vincent and the Grenadines) Jante James	Sion Hill	13

== Multiple hat-tricks ==
Rank	Country	Player	Hat-tricks
1	(Saint Vincent and the Grenadines)	Jante James	2
2	(Saint Vincent and the Grenadines)	Valdo Anderson	1
2		D Cupid	1
2	(Saint Vincent and the Grenadines)	Juma Gilkes	1
2	(Saint Vincent and the Grenadines)	Cherslon Hendrickson	1
2	(Saint Vincent and the Grenadines)	Seaquean Millington	1
2		J Oliviere	1
2	(Saint Vincent and the Grenadines)	Carlos Solomon	1
2	(Saint Vincent and the Grenadines)	Dequan Springer	1
