= System 3 FC =

Association football club in Kingstown, St Vincent and the Grenadines

- Full name: System 3 Football Club
- Founded: 1997; 29 years ago
- Ground: Victoria Park
- Capacity: 5,420
- League: SVGFF Premier Division

System 3 Football Club is a professional football club based in Kingstown, St Vincent and the Grenadines. They currently play in the SVGFF Premier Division.

== History ==
System 3 FC was founded in 1997. The club has become a well known force in Vincentian football. Having placed 2nd in the NLA Premier League, they qualified for the first round of the 2010 CFU Club Championship where they eventually progressed to the Second Round and subsequently lost to Bayamón FC of Puerto Rico.

- (probably not all)System 3 Different Team(s)
  - System 3 B
  - System 3 Under-14
  - System 3 B Under-14
  - System 3 Under-10

== Achievements ==
- SVGFF Premier Division: 2

2016, 2026

- CFU Club Championship: 1 appearance

2010 – Second Round

== Managerial history ==
- Kendale Mercury (2010)
- Wayde Jackson
