= Saint Vincent and the Grenadines Football Federation =

Governing body of association football in Saint Vincent and the Grenadines

CONCACAF
- Founded: 1979
- Headquarters: Kingstown
- FIFA affiliation: 1988
- CONCACAF affiliation: 1986
- President: Otashie Spring
- General Secretary: Peter Edward

The Saint Vincent and the Grenadines Football Federation (SVGFF) is the governing body of football in the island state of Saint Vincent and the Grenadines. It was founded in 1979 but only gained ascension into FIFA in 1988. Currently based in Kingstown, it oversees all aspects of football in Saint Vincent and the Grenadines including the Saint Vincent and the Grenadines national football team and the NLA Premier League.

== Executive committee ==
Member	Role	Notes
Otashie Spring	President	
Dominique Stowe	First Vice-President	
Yosiah Dascent	Second Vice-President	
Dwight Roberts	Third Vice-President	
Peter Edward	General secretary	
Theon Gordon	Technical director	
	Media Officer	
Denis Byam	Physiotherapist	

Source: Saint Vincent and the Grenadines Football Federation

Name	Position	Source
(Saint Vincent and the Grenadines) Carl Dickson	President	
(Saint Vincent and the Grenadines) Otashie Spring	Vice-president	
(Saint Vincent and the Grenadines) Peter Edward	General secretary (acting)	
(Saint Vincent and the Grenadines) Otashie Spring	Treasurer	
(Saint Vincent and the Grenadines) Theon Gordon	Technical director	
(Saint Vincent and the Grenadines) Ezra Hendrickson	Team coach (men's)	
(Saint Vincent and the Grenadines) Alnif Williams	Team coach (women's)	
n/a	Media/communications manager	
n/a	Futsal Coordinator	
(Saint Vincent and the Grenadines) Lorson Lewis	Referee coordinator	
