= 2016 Sydney United 58 FC season =

Sydney United 58 FC
2016 NPL NSW Men's 1 season
- Chairman: Mark Ivančić
- Manager: Marko Rudan
- Stadium: Sydney United Sports Centre
- NPL NSW Men's 1: 1st (League); Runner-Up (Final Series)
- FFA Cup: Round of 32
- Waratah Cup: Winners
- NPL Championship: Winners
- Top goalscorer: League: Chris Payne (22) All: Chris Payne (33)
- Biggest win: 6–0 vs. Bankstown City Lions (20 April 2016); FFA Cup
- Biggest defeat: 2-6 vs. Blacktown City (27 July 2016); FFA Cup

The 2016 season saw Sydney United embark on its twelfth consecutive season in the NPL NSW Men's era. Under the guidance of Marko Rudan, Sydney United secured a treble of trophies. They clinched the 2016 NPL NSW Men's 1 Premiership, finishing nine points ahead of their nearest rivals and suffering only two defeats throughout the entire season. Furthermore, they won the NPL Championship, emerging as champions of NPL Australia after a decisive 4–1 victory over the Edgeworth Eagles in the final. Additionally, they triumphed in the Waratah Cup, defeating Manly United 1–0 in the final.

Nevertheless, Sydney United encountered a setback in the NPL NSW Grand Final, where they were defeated 3–0 by Blacktown City. They also faced an earlier loss to Blacktown City in the FFA Cup, with a score of 6–2 in the Round of 32.

Chris Payne topped the league's goalscoring charts with 22 goals in 21 games. All in all, he scored 33 goals in all competitions.

While Tomislav Uskok, Panni Nikas, Chris Payne and Thomas Manos made the 2016 NPL NSW Team of the Year.

== Players ==
Note: Flags indicate national team as defined under FIFA eligibility rules; some limited exceptions apply. Players may hold more than one non-FIFA nationality.

No.	Pos.	Nation	Player
1	GK	AUS	Andrew Depta
2	DF	AUS	Kristopher Vlismas
3	DF	JPN	Masato Mochizuki
4	DF	AUS	Eddy Bosnar
5	DF	AUS	Nathan Bertolissio
6	FW	AUS	Chris Payne
7	MF	JPN	Yutaro Shin
8	MF	AUS	Peter Triantis
9	FW	AUS	Liam Ivančić (Youth)
10	MF	AUS	Robert Mileski (Captain)
11	FW	AUS	Nikola Taneski
12	FW	AUS	Jack Stewart
13	MF	AUS	Richard Darko
14	MF	AUS	Nick Stavroulakis
16	MF	AUS	Anthony Vrlic
17	DF	AUS	Theo Kofinas
18	MF	AUS	Glen Trifiro

No.	Pos.	Nation	Player
19	DF	AUS	Matthew Bilic
20	DF	AUS	Tomislav Uskok
21	GK	AUS	Thomas Manos
22	DF	AUS	Yianni Fragogiannis
23	MF	AUS	Panni Nikas
24	DF	AUS	Jacob Tratt
27	MF	AUS	Marcus Donatiello
29	MF	AUS	Daniel Dias (Youth)
30	GK	AUS	Luke Babic
32	DF	AUS	Mark Rizoski (Youth)
33	DF	AUS	Nathan Sherlock
35	FW	AUS	Alex Vlismas (Youth)
36	FW	AUS	James Temelkovski (Youth)
37	DF	AUS	Kyle Dominici (Youth)
40	GK	AUS	Gabriel Koliomihos (Youth)
—	GK	AUS	Lucas Pervan (Youth)

=== Transfers in ===
No.	Pos.	Nat.	Name	Age	Moving from	Type	Transfer window	Ends	Transfer fee	Source
4	DF	(Australia)	Eddy Bosnar	35	Central Coast Mariners (Australia)	Transfer	Pre-season		Free	
6	FW	(Australia)	Chris Payne	25	Manly United (Australia)	Transfer	Pre-season		Free	
7	MF	(Japan)	Yutaro Shin	26	Azul Claro Numazu (Japan)	Transfer	Pre-season		Free	
3	DF	(Japan)	Masato Mochizuki	24	Machida Zelvia (Japan)	Transfer	Pre-season		Free	
21	GK	(Australia)	Thomas Manos	20	Wollongong Wolves (Australia)	Transfer	Pre-season		Free	
22	DF	(Australia)	Yianni Fragogiannis	24	Blacktown City (Australia)	Transfer	Pre-season		Free	
1	GK	(Australia)	Andrew Depta		Sutherland Sharks (Australia)	Transfer	Pre-season		Free	
27	MF	(Australia)	Marcus Donatiello	18	Marconi Stallions (Australia)	Transfer	Pre-season		Free	

=== Transfers out ===
No.	Pos.	Nat.	Name	Age	Moving to	Type	Transfer window	Transfer fee	Source
12	MF	(Netherlands)	Koen Bosma	25	Amsterdamsche FC (Netherlands)	End of Contract	Pre-season	Free	
21	MF	(Australia)	Chris Zuvela	19	Sydney FC Youth (Australia)	End of Contract	Pre-season	Free	
	FW	(Australia)	Richard Cardozo	29	Naxxar Lions (Malta)	End of Contract	Pre-season	Free	
1	GK	(Australia)	Justin Pasfield	30	Wollongong Wolves (Australia)	End of Contract	Pre-season	Free	
10	MF	(Australia)	Chris Triantis	28	Sydney Olympic (Australia)	End of Contract	Pre-season	Free	
5	MF	(Australia)	Anthony Tomelic	22	Sydney Olympic (Australia)	End of Contract	Pre-season	Free	
6	MF	(Australia)	Mitchell Stamatellis	24	Sydney Olympic (Australia)	End of Contract	Pre-season	Free	
15	MF	(Australia)	Mark Cindric	20	Sydney Olympic (Australia)	End of Contract	Pre-season	Free	
8	MF	(Australia)	Ante Tomic	24	Parramatta FC (Australia)	End of Contract	Pre-season	Free	
20	DF	(Australia)	Ibrahim Haydar	27	Parramatta FC (Australia)	End of Contract	Pre-season	Free	
	FW	(Australia)	Tomislav Borovickic		Parramatta FC (Australia)	End of Contract	Pre-season	Free	
	MF	(Australia)	Lachlan Roberts	18	Western Sydney Wanderers Youth (Australia)	End of Contract	Pre-season	Free	
24	DF	(Australia)	Phil Makrys	30	Marconi Stallions (Australia)	End of Contract	Pre-season	Free	
18	DF	(Australia)	Emmanuel Giannaros	26	Marconi Stallions (Australia)	End of Contract	Pre-season	Free	
11	FW	(Australia)	Daniel Dragicevic	27	Gold Coast City FC (Australia)	End of Contract	Pre-season	Free	
	DF	(Australia)	Bradie Smith	17	North Shore Mariners (Australia)	End of Contract	Pre-season	Free	
	MF	(Australia)	Marko Filipovic	31	retired	End of Contract	Pre-season	Free	

=== Mid-Season Transfers ===
No.	Pos.	Nat.	Name	Age	Moving from	Type	Transfer window	Ends	Transfer fee	Source
20	DF	(Australia)	Tomislav Uskok	24	Central Coast Mariners (Australia)	Transfer	Round 6		Free	
24	DF	(Australia)	Jacob Tratt	21	Sydney FC (Australia)	Transfer	Round 9		Free	
18	MF	(Australia)	Glen Trifiro	26	Free agent	Transfer	Round 16		Free	

== Competitions ==
=== Overview ===
Competition	First match	Last match	Starting round	Final position	Record							
Competition	First match	Last match	Starting round	Final position	Pld	W	D	L	GF	GA	GD	Win %
NPL NSW Men's 1	13 March 2016	14 August 2016	Matchday 1	Winners	22	17	3	2	58	21	+37	77.27
NPL NSW Final Series	28 August 2016	11 September 2016	Semi-Final	Runner's Up	3	1	0	2	5	8	−3	33.33
NPL Championship	18 September 2016	2 October 2016	Quarter-Finals	Winners	3	3	0	0	12	6	+6	100.00
Waratah Cup	22 June 2016	10 July 2016	Semi-Final	Winners	2	2	0	0	6	1	+5	100.00
FFA Cup	6 April 2016	27 July 2016	Fourth Round	Round of 32	5	4	0	1	20	8	+12	80.00
Total					35	27	3	5	101	44	+57	77.14

Last updated: complete
Source: Competitions

=== National Premier League NSW 1 ===
==== League table ====
Pos	Team	Pld	W	D	L	GF	GA	GD	Pts	Qualification or relegation
1	Sydney United 58	22	17	3	2	58	21	+37	54	2016 National Premier Leagues Finals
2	Blacktown City (C)	22	14	3	5	47	26	+21	45	2016 NSW Finals
3	Manly United	22	12	7	3	58	26	+32	43	2016 NSW Finals
4	Rockdale City Suns	22	11	5	6	41	32	+9	38	2016 NSW Finals
5	Bonnyrigg White Eagles	22	9	5	8	43	38	+5	32	2016 NSW Finals
6	Sydney Olympic	22	7	6	9	26	30	−4	27	
7	Sutherland Sharks	22	8	3	11	31	40	−9	27	
8	APIA Leichhardt Tigers	22	7	5	10	39	41	−2	26	
9	Hakoah Sydney City East	22	7	2	13	40	54	−14	23	
10	Parramatta FC	22	7	2	13	28	44	−16	23	
11	Wollongong Wolves	22	5	4	13	23	37	−14	19	
12	Blacktown Spartans (R)	22	4	3	15	22	52	−30	15	Relegation to the 2017 NPL NSW 2 (Note: Promotion and Relegation system based on Club Championship and including points from U20 and U18 teams.)

Source: foxsportspulse.com
Rules for classification: 1) points; 2) goal difference; 3) number of goals scored.
(C) Champions; (R) Relegated

=== Pre-season Matches ===
24 January 2016 1	Sydney United 58	2-0	Hakoah Sydney City East	Edensor Park
		Report		Stadium: Sydney United Sports Centre

14 February 2016 2	Sydney United 58	3–2	Melbourne Knights	Edensor Park
		Report		Stadium: Sydney United Sports Centre

24 February 2016 3	Sydney United 58	1-5	Guangzhou R&F	Glenwood
		Report		Stadium: Valentine Sports Park

2 March 2016 4	Sydney United 58	1-1	Parramatta FC	Glenwood
		Report		Stadium: Valentine Sports Park

=== Matches ===
13 March 2016 1	Blacktown City	3-2	Sydney United 58	Seven Hills
	Macura 21'; Gibbs 70' (pen.); Major 76'	Report	Nikas 54'; Bosnar 61'	Stadium: Lily's Football Centre; Referee: Ben Abraham

21 March 2016 2	Sydney United 58	2-1	Wollongong Wolves	Edensor Park
	Triantis 48'; Nikas 61'	Report	Bernal 68'	Stadium: Sydney United Sports Centre; Referee: Stephen Lucas

28 March 2016 3	Sydney United 58	4-0	Sutherland Sharks	Edensor Park
	Nikas 40'; Payne 53', 56'; Taneski 84'	Report		Stadium: Sydney United Sports Centre; Referee: Kurt Ams

3 April 2016 4	Rockdale Ilinden	0-2	Sydney United 58	Rockdale
		Report	Payne 19', 39'	Stadium: Rockdale Ilinden Sports Centre; Referee: Adrian Arndt

10 April 2016 5	Sydney United 58	3-0	Sydney Olympic	Edensor Park
	Payne 5'; Nikas 55', 61'	Report		Stadium: Sydney United Sports Centre

16 April 2016 6	Blacktown Spartans	0-3	Sydney United 58	Rooty Hill
		Report	Nikas 54'; Payne 68'; Uskok 83'	Stadium: Blacktown International Sportspark

24 April 2016 7	Sydney United 58	5-1	Parramatta FC	Edensor Park
4pm	Payne 9' (pen.), 37' (pen.); Nikas 20' (pen.); Mileski 33', 81'	Report	Tomic 43'	Stadium: Sydney United Sports Centre; Referee: Michael Weiner

1 May 2016 8	APIA Leichhardt	0-3	Sydney United 58	Leichhardt
3pm		Report	Nikas 3' (pen.); Payne 22'; Mileski 88'	Stadium: Lambert Park; Referee: Kurt Ams

8 May 2016 9	Sydney United 58	2-1	Bonnyrigg White Eagles	Edensor Park
	Payne 15'; Tratt 44'	Report	Younis 51'	Stadium: Sydney United Sports Centre; Referee: Kris Griffiths-Jones

14 May 2016 10	Manly United	1-1	Sydney United 58	Cromer
	Pandurevic 86'	Report	Nikas 60'	Stadium: Cromer Park

22 May 2016 11	Sydney United 58	4-1	Hakoah Sydney City East	Edensor Park
	Payne 7', 38', 60'; Nikas 77'	Report	De Jong 76'	Stadium: Sydney United Sports Centre; Referee: Michael Weiner

29 May 2016 12	Sydney United 58	1-0	Blacktown City FC	Edensor Park
4pm	Shin 62'	Report		Stadium: Sydney United Sports Centre; Referee: Kurt Ams

13 July 2016 13	Wollongong Wolves	0-1	Sydney United 58	Wollongong
		Report	Nikas 17'	Stadium: Hooka Creek Park; Referee: Kris Griffiths-Jones

11 June 2016 14	Sutherland Sharks	2-2	Sydney United 58	Miranda
	Kajiyama 31'; Kayes 88'	Report	Nikas 57', 71'	Stadium: Seymour Shaw Park; Referee: Adrian Arndt

19 June 2016 15	Sydney United 58	3-2	Rockdale Ilinden	Edensor Park
4pm	Payne 4', 35' (pen.); Mochizuki 43'	Report	Macallister 39' (pen.); Canak 69'	Stadium: Sydney United Sports Centre; Referee: C.Young

26 June 2016 16	Sydney Olympic	0-2	Sydney United 58	Belmore
		Report	Nikas 46'; Payne 78'	Stadium: Belmore Sports Ground; Referee: C.Fisher

3 July 2016 17	Sydney United 58	3-1	Blacktown Spartans	Edensor Park
4pm	Taneski 1'; Tratt 20'; Trifiro 67'	Report	Sasaki 7'	Stadium: Sydney United Sports Centre; Referee: Adrian Arndt

17 July 2016 18	Parramatta FC	0-2	Sydney United 58	South Granville
3pm		Report	Payne 16'; Trifiro 18'	Stadium: Melita Stadium

24 July 2016 19	Sydney United 58	2-2	APIA Leichhardt	Edensor Park
	Nikas 55'; Payne 66'	Report	Olsen 62', 83'	Stadium: Sydney United Sports Centre; Referee: Ben Abraham

31 July 2016 20	Bonnyrigg White Eagles	1-4	Sydney United 58	Glenwood
	Younis 90+4'	Report	Nikas 25'; Payne 69' (pen.), 81'; Tratt 76'	Stadium: Valentine Sports Park; Referee: C.Young

7 August 2016 21	Sydney United 58	2-4	Manly United	Edensor Park
	Bilic 35'; Payne 74'	Report	Gallagher 29'; Parkhouse 44', 63', 73'	Stadium: Sydney United Sports Centre; Referee: M.Ingham

14 August 2016 22	Hakoah Sydney City East	1-3	Sydney United 58	Eastgardens
	Bowden-Haase 35'	Report	Payne 7'; Nikas (?); Taneski 73'	Stadium: Hensley Athletic Field; Referee: J.Bitas

28 August 2016 Semi-Final	Sydney United 58	2-3	Blacktown City	Edensor Park
	Stavaroulakis 43'; Payne 44'	Report	Evans 3'; Antelmi 72'; Choi 89'	Stadium: Sydney United Sports Centre; Referee: Chris Young

4 September 2016 Preliminary Final	Sydney United 58	3-2	Bonnyrigg White Eagles	Edensor Park
	Nikas 50'; Payne 90+1'; Trifiro 117'	Report	Kadric 79', 86'	Stadium: Sydney United Sports Centre; Referee: Stephen Lucas

11 September 2016 Grand Final	Blacktown City	3-0	Sydney United 58	Lilyfield
	Choi 40', 86'; Antelmi 72'	Report		Stadium: Leichhardt Oval; Referee: Kris Griffiths-Jones

=== NPL Championship ===
18 September 2016 Quarter-Finals	Sydney United 58	5-4	Adelaide City	Edensor Park
	Shin 20'; Nikas 33', 57' (pen.), 77'; Payne 91'	Report	Allwright 45', 60'; Halliday 68'; Costa 89'	Stadium: Sydney United Sports Centre; Referee: Ben Abraham

25 September 2016 Semi-Finals	Sydney United 58	2-1	Brisbane Strikers	Edensor Park
	Nikas 51', 71'	Report	Clulow 35'	Stadium: Sydney United Sports Centre; Referee: Adam Susz

2 October 2016 Final	Sydney United 58	4-1	Edgeworth Eagles	Edensor Park
	Trifiro 29', 78', 88'; Nikas 17'	Report	Moriyasu 69' (pen.)	Stadium: Sydney United Sports Centre; Referee: Alex King

=== Waratah Cup ===
22 June 2016 Semi-Final	Sydney United 58	5-1	Marconi Stallions	Edensor Park
	Payne 6', 36', 42'; Uskok 24'; Nikas 38'	Report	Perre 64'	Stadium: Sydney United Sports Centre; Referee: Michael Weiner

10 July 2016 Grand Final	Manly United	0-1	Sydney United 58	Leichhardt
		Report	Shin 46'	Stadium: Lambert Park; Referee: Stephen Lucas

=== Australia Cup ===
6 April 2016 Fourth round	Sutherland Sharks	0-4	Sydney United 58	Miranda
		Report	Nikas; Mileski	Stadium: Seymour Shaw Park

20 April 2016 Fifth round	Bankstown City Lions	0-6	Sydney United 58	Sefton
		Report	Payne; Taneski; Shin	Stadium: Jensen Oval

4 May 2016 Sixth round	Hawkesbury City	1-6	Sydney United 58	Richmond
		Report	Shin; Uskok; Mileski; Taneski; Bilic; Nikas	Stadium: David Bertenshaw Field

19 May 2016 Seventh round	Sydney United 58	2-1	Sydney Olympic	Edensor Park
	Uskok; Payne	Report	Gaitatzis	Stadium: Sydney United Sports Centre

27 July 2016 Round of 32	Blacktown City	6-2	Sydney United 58	Seven Hills
	Gibbs 35'; Antelmi 74', 111', 120'; Choi 104'; Mallia 112'	Report	Payne 10'; Mileski 13'	Stadium: Lily's Football Centre; Attendance: 877; Referee: Stephen Lucas

== Statistics ==
=== Appearances and goals ===
Players with no appearances not included in the list.

No.	Pos.	Nat.	Name	NPL NSW Men's 1		FFA Cup		NPL Championship		Waratah Cup		Total	
No.	Pos.	Nat.	Name	Apps	Goals	Apps	Goals	Apps	Goals	Apps	Goals	Apps	Goals
1	GK	(Australia)	Andrew Depta	0	0	1	0	0	0	0	0	1	0
2	DF	(Australia)	Kristopher Vlismas	10	0	1	0	3	0	1	0	15	0
3	DF	(Japan)	Masato Mochizuki	13	1	3	0	2	0	2	0	20	1
4	DF	(Australia)	Eddy Bosnar	9	1	1	0	0	0	2	0	12	1
5	DF	(Australia)	Nathan Bertolissio	3	0	1	0	0	0	1	0	5	0
6	FW	(Australia)	Chris Payne	24	24	5	5	3	1	2	3	34	33
7	MF	(Japan)	Yutaro Shin	23	1	5	2	3	1	2	1	33	7
8	MF	(Australia)	Peter Triantis	24	2	3	0	3	0	1	0	31	2
9	FW	(Australia)	Liam Ivancic	1	0	0	0	0	0	0	0	1	0
10	MF	(Australia)	Robert Mileski	21	3	5	3	2	0	2	0	30	6
11	FW	(Australia)	Nikola Taneski	24	3	4	3	1	0	1	0	30	6
12	FW	(Australia)	Jack Stewart	0	0	1	0	0	0	1	0	2	0
13	MF	(Australia)	Richard Darko	0	0	1	0	0	0	0	0	1	0
14	MF	(Australia)	Nick Stavroulakis	19	1	4	0	3	0	2	0	28	1
16	MF	(Australia)	Anthony Vrlic	5	0	4	0	0	0	1	0	10	0
17	DF	(Australia)	Theo Kofinas	15	0	4	0	2	0	1	0	22	0
18	MF	(Australia)	Glen Trifiro	10	3	1	0	3	3	1	0	16	6
19	DF	(Australia)	Matthew Bilic	16	1	3	1	3	0	0	0	22	2
20	DF	(Australia)	Tomislav Uskok	19	1	3	2	3	0	2	1	27	4
21	GK	(Australia)	Thomas Manos	25	0	5	0	3	0	2	0	35	0
22	DF	(Australia)	Yianni Fragogiannis	9	0	1	0	2	0	0	0	12	0
23	MF	(Australia)	Panni Nikas	24	18	5	4	3	6	2	1	34	29
24	DF	(Australia)	Jacob Tratt	17	2	3	0	1	0	2	0	23	2
27	MF	(Australia)	Marcus Donatiello	3	0	2	0	0	0	0	0	5	0
30	GK	(Australia)	Luke Babic	0	0	1	0	0	0	0	0	1	0
32	DF	(Australia)	Mark Rizoski	0	0	1	0	0	0	0	0	1	0
33	DF	(Australia)	Nathan Sherlock	6	0	0	0	0	0	2	0	8	0
35	FW	(Australia)	Alex Vlismas	0	0	1	0	0	0	0	0	1	0
36	FW	(Australia)	James Temelkovski	0	0	1	0	0	0	0	0	1	0
37	DF	(Australia)	Kyle Dominici	0	0	1	0	0	0	0	0	1	0
40	GK	(Australia)	Gabriel Koliomihos	0	0	1	0	0	0	0	0	1	0
