= List of National Premier Leagues NSW Men's honours =

This is a list of National Premier Leagues NSW honours achieved since the inaugural season of the league in 2013. The following details honours won by National Premier Leagues NPL Men clubs and those awarded to players, managers and referees of the competition.

== Club honours ==
=== Premiers ===
Year	Premiers	Runners-up
2013	Sydney United 58	Sutherland Sharks FC
2014	Bonnyrigg White Eagles	Blacktown Spartans
2015	Blacktown City	APIA Leichhardt
2016	Sydney United 58	Blacktown City
2017	APIA Leichhardt	Blacktown City
2018	Sydney Olympic	APIA Leichhardt
2019	Wollongong Wolves	APIA Leichhardt
2020	Rockdale City Suns	Wollongong Wolves
2021	Cancelled due to the COVID-19 Pandemic in Australia	
2022	Sydney Olympic	Manly United
2023	APIA Leichhardt	Rockdale Ilinden
2024	Rockdale Ilinden	Marconi Stallions

=== Champions ===
Year	Premiers	Runners-up
2013	Bonnyrigg White Eagles	Rockdale City Suns
2014	Blacktown City	Sydney Olympic
2015	Bonnyrigg White Eagles	Blacktown City
2016	Blacktown City	Sydney United 58
2017	Manly United	APIA Leichhardt
2018	Sydney Olympic	APIA Leichhardt
2019	APIA Leichhardt	Sydney United 58
2020	Sydney United 58	Rockdale City Suns
2021	Cancelled due to the COVID-19 Pandemic in Australia	
2022	Blacktown City	Manly United
2023	No finals	
2024	Marconi Stallions	Rockdale Ilinden

=== Club Championship ===
The Club Championship goes to the team with highest points from first grade and U-20's competitions (with points modifiers). In previous editions it has included the U-18's premiership also and used as a tool for promotion/relegation. Currently, the Club Championship is calculated from first grade premiership points x4 and under 20's premiership points x2 and promotion/relegation is determined by first grade premiership standings.

Year	Club
2013	Marconi Stallions
2014	Blacktown City
2015	Blacktown City
2016	Manly United
2017	Blacktown City
2018	Blacktown City
2019	Blacktown City
2020	Not awarded due to COVID-19 Pandemic in Australia
2021	Not awarded due to COVID-19 Pandemic in Australia
2022	Blacktown City
2023	Rockdale Ilinden

=== Fair Play Award ===
The Fair Play Award goes to the team with the fewest points on the fair play ladder at the conclusion of the regular season. The award was first presented in 2017.

Year	Club
2017	Sydney FC Youth
2018	Manly United
2019	Sydney FC Youth
2020	Not awarded due to COVID-19 Pandemic in Australia
2021	Not awarded due to COVID-19 Pandemic in Australia
2022	Sydney FC Youth
2023	Sydney FC Youth

== Individual honours ==
=== Player of the Year ===
Year	Player	Club
2013	Panny Nikas	Sutherland Sharks FC
2014	Travis Major	Blacktown City FC
2015	Franco Parisi	APIA Leichhardt
2016	Adam Parkhouse	Manly United
2017	Sean Symons	APIA Leichhardt
2018	Tasuku Sekiya	APIA Leichhardt
2019	Thomas James	Wollongong Wolves
2020	Not awarded due to COVID-19 Pandemic in Australia	
2021	Not awarded due to COVID-19 Pandemic in Australia	
2022	Jaiden Kucharski	Sydney FC Youth
2023	Alec Urosevski	Rockdale Ilinden

=== Robbie Slater Award ===
The Robbie Slater Award is given to the player of the match in the Grand Final.

Year	Player	Club	Ref.
2013	Alex Mansueto	Bonnyrigg White Eagles	
2014	unknown		
2015	Chris Tadrosse	Bonnyrigg White Eagles	
2016	Danny Choi	Blacktown City	
2017	Dylan Mitchell	Manly United	
2018	Álex Sánchez	Sydney Olympic	
2019	Sean Symons	APIA Leichhardt	
2020	Glen Trifiro	Sydney United 58	
2021	Cancelled due to the COVID-19 Pandemic in Australia		
2022	Travis Major	Blacktown City	
2023	No finals series		

=== Golden Boot ===
Year	Player	Club	Goals
2013	Richard Cardozo Luka Glavas Panny Nikas	Rockdale City Suns Sydney United 58 Sutherland Sharks	16
2014	Robert Younis	Bonnyrigg White Eagles	17
2015	Blake Powell	APIA Leichhardt	21
2016	Chris Payne	Sydney United 58	22
2017	Panny Nikas Tomohiro Kajiyama	Sydney United 58 Sutherland Sharks	13
2018	Jordan Murray	APIA Leichhardt	23
2019	Thomas James	Wollongong Wolves	22
2020	Not awarded due to COVID-19 Pandemic in Australia		
2021	Not awarded due to COVID-19 Pandemic in Australia		
2022	Roy O'Donovan	Sydney Olympic	21
2023	Alec Urosevski	Rockdale Ilinden	27
2024	Alec Urosevski	Rockdale Ilinden	31

=== Coach of the Year ===
Year	Coach	Club
2013	Marko Rudan	Sydney United 58 FC
2014	Mark Crittenden	Blacktown City FC
2015	Mark Crittenden	Blacktown City FC
2016	Paul Dee	Manly United
2017	Danial Cummins	APIA Leichhardt
2018	Abbas Saad	Sydney Olympic
2019	Luke Wilkshire	Wollongong Wolves
2020	Not awarded due to COVID-19 Pandemic in Australia	
2021	Not awarded due to COVID-19 Pandemic in Australia	
2022	Adam Griffiths	Manly United
2023	Franco Parisi	APIA Leichhardt

=== Goalkeeper of the Year ===
Year	Player/s	Club
2013	James Chronopolous	Marconi Stallions
2014	Matthew Nash	Bonnyrigg White Eagles
2015	Nenad Vekic	Blacktown City FC
2016	Paul Henderson	Sydney Olympic
2017	Ante Covic Paul Henderson	Rockdale City Suns Sydney Olympic
2018	Paul Henderson	Sydney Olympic
2019	Carlos Saliadarre	Mt Druitt Town Rangers
2020	Not awarded due to COVID-19 Pandemic in Australia	
2021	Not awarded due to COVID-19 Pandemic in Australia	
2022	Jack Greenwood	Manly United
2023	Ivan Necevski	APIA Leichhardt
2025	James Hilton	Marconi Stallions

=== Goal of the Year ===
Year	Player	Club
2013	Aaron Peterson	Bonnyrigg White Eagles
2014	Dom Ferguson	Manly United
2015	Blake Powell	APIA Leichhardt
2016	Richard Cardozo	Manly United
2017	Panny Nikas	Sydney United 58
2018	Thomas Whiteside	Sydney Olympic
2019	Nikola Djordjevic	Wollongong Wolves
2020	Not awarded due to COVID-19 Pandemic in Australia	
2021	Not awarded due to COVID-19 Pandemic in Australia	
2022	Bruno Mendes	Manly United

=== Referee of the Year ===
Year	Referee
2013	Kurt Ams
2014	Steven Lucas
2015	Kurt Ams
2016	Kris Griffith-Jones
2017	Kurt Ams
2018	Kurt Ams
2019	Ben Abraham
2020	Not awarded due to COVID-19 Pandemic in Australia
2021	Not awarded due to COVID-19 Pandemic in Australia
2022	Hassan Jomaa
2023	Sam Kelly
