= 2015 Football Federation Tasmania season =

Football Federation Tasmania
- Season: 2015

The Football Federation Tasmania 2015 season was the third season under the new competition format in Tasmania. The competition consists of three major divisions across the State of Tasmania, created from the teams in the previous structure. The overall champion for the new structure qualified for the National Premier Leagues finals series, competing with the other state federation champions in a final knockout tournament to decide the National Premier Leagues Champion for 2015.

== Men's Competitions ==
=== 2015 NPL Tasmania ===
Playstation 4 Victory League
- Season: 2015
- Champions: Olympia
- Matches: 84
- Goals: 401 (4.77 per match)
- Top goalscorer: Brayden Mann (29 goals)
- Biggest home win: Olympia 14−0 Glenorchy Knights (21 June 2015)
- Biggest away win: Glenorchy Knights 0−8 Olympia (25 April 2015); Glenorchy Knights 0−8 South Hobart (17 May 2015)
- Highest scoring: Olympia 14−0 Glenorchy Knights (21 June 2015)

The 2015 T-League season was played as a triple round-robin over 21 rounds.

Pos	Team	Pld	W	D	L	GF	GA	GD	Pts	Qualification or relegation
1	Olympia (C)	21	15	3	3	83	14	+69	48	2015 National Premier Leagues Finals
2	South Hobart	21	15	1	5	73	27	+46	46	2015 Victory Cup
3	Hobart Zebras	21	12	5	4	57	24	+33	41	2015 Victory Cup
4	Northern Rangers	21	8	7	6	63	34	+29	31	2015 Victory Cup
5	Launceston City	21	7	3	11	39	51	−12	24	2015 Victory Cup
6	Kingborough Lions United	21	7	2	12	37	60	−23	23	2015 Victory Cup
7	Devonport City	21	6	3	12	42	51	−9	21	
8	Glenorchy Knights (R)	21	2	0	19	15	148	−133	6	Relegated to the 2016 Tasmanian Championship

Source: foxsportspulse.com
Rules for classification: 1) points; 2) goal difference; 3) number of goals scored.
(C) Champions; (R) Relegated

==== League Cup ====
An end of season finals series for the Victory Cup was held using an expanded format, which included the top six teams from the Victory League as well as the premiers from the Northern Championship (Somerset) and Southern Championship (University of Tasmania). The quarter-final and semi-final matches were decided by random draw.

Quarter-finals
Kingborough Lions	0
Hobart Zebras	5
South Hobart	2
Somerset	1
University of Tasmania	5
Launceston City	1
Olympia	1
Northern Rangers	0

Semi-finals
Hobart Zebras	3
South Hobart	0
University of Tasmania	4 (2)
Olympia	4 (4)

Final
Hobart Zebras	1
Olympia	3

==== Top Scorers ====
Rank	Player	Club	Goals
1	(Australia) Brayden Mann	South Hobart	29
2	(Australia) Adam McKeown	Hobart Zebras	26
3	(Australia) Emmanuel Tsakiris	Olympia	23
4	(Australia) Danny Cowen	Kingborough Lions United	15
5	(Australia) Luke Eyles	Olympia	14
5	(Denmark) Mads Schaldemose	Northern Rangers	14

=== 2015 Tasmanian Championships ===
==== 2015 Northern Championship ====
Northern Championship
- Season: 2015
- Champions: Somerset
- Matches: 84
- Goals: 345 (4.11 per match)

The 2015 Northern Championship is the third edition of the newly renamed Northern Championship as the second level domestic association football competition in Tasmania (third level overall in Australia). The league consists of 8 teams, playing 21 matches.

Pos	Team	Pld	W	D	L	GF	GA	GD	Pts	Qualification or relegation
1	Somerset	21	17	2	2	69	22	+47	53	2015 Victory Cup
2	Ulverstone	21	12	4	5	56	35	+21	40	
3	Launceston United	21	11	4	6	44	31	+13	37	
4	Northern Rangers B	21	7	6	8	42	41	+1	27	
5	Burnie United	21	7	4	10	33	44	−11	25	
6	Riverside Olympic	21	5	6	10	36	50	−14	21	
7	Launceston City B	21	5	3	13	31	67	−36	18	
8	Devonport City B	21	3	5	13	34	68	−34	14	

Source: foxsportspulse.com
Rules for classification: 1) points; 2) goal difference; 3) number of goals scored.

==== 2015 Southern Championship ====
Southern Championship
- Season: 2015
- Champions: University of Tasmania
- Matches: 84
- Goals: 367 (4.37 per match)

The 2015 Southern Championship is the third edition of the newly renamed Southern Championship as the second level domestic association football competition in Tasmania (third level overall in Australia). All teams will play 2 complete rounds until Round 16. At the end of Round 16 the top 4 teams will play an additional round against each other. The next 4 teams will also play each other an additional time. The team finishing last will not continue after Round 16.

Pos	Team	Pld	W	D	L	GF	GA	GD	Pts	Qualification or relegation
1	University of Tasmania	19	14	1	4	65	19	+46	43	2015 Victory Cup
2	Clarence United (P)	19	13	3	3	49	28	+21	42	Promoted to the 2016 National Premier Leagues Tasmania
3	Taroona	19	10	4	5	59	30	+29	34	
4	Beachside	19	9	4	6	64	38	+26	31	
5	Hobart United	19	9	3	7	49	45	+4	30	
6	Southern FC	19	8	2	9	32	46	−14	26	
7	Metro FC	19	3	4	12	26	71	−45	13	
8	Nelson Eastern Suburbs	19	3	3	13	23	52	−29	12	
9	New Town Eagles	16	2	2	12	18	56	−38	8	

Source: foxsportspulse.com
Rules for classification: 1) points; 2) goal difference; 3) number of goals scored.
(P) Promoted

=== 2015 Tasmanian League One ===
==== 2015 Northern League One ====
Northern League One
- Season: 2015

The 2015 Northern League One was the third edition of the new Tasmanian League One as the third level domestic association football competition in Tasmania (fourth level overall in Australia). 8 teams competed, all playing each other twice for a total of 21 matches.

Pos	Team	Pld	W	D	L	GF	GA	GD	Pts
1	Northern Rangers C (C)	21	17	2	2	61	23	+38	53
2	Somerset B	21	15	2	4	89	45	+44	47
3	Riverside Olympic B	21	11	3	7	59	49	+10	36
4	Launceston United B	21	9	3	9	47	52	−5	30
5	Launceston City C	21	6	4	11	39	53	−14	22
6	Burnie United B	21	6	4	11	38	54	−16	22
7	Devonport City C	21	6	1	14	45	67	−22	19
8	Ulverstone B	21	4	1	16	35	70	−35	13

(C) Champions

==== 2015 Southern League One ====
Southern League One
- Season: 2015

The 2015 Southern League One was the third edition of the new Tasmanian League One as the third level domestic association football competition in Tasmania (fourth level overall in Australia). All teams will play 2 complete rounds until Round 16. At the end of Round 16 the top 4 teams will play an additional round against each other. The next 4 teams will also play each other an additional time. The team finishing last will not continue after Round 16.

Pos	Team	Pld	W	D	L	GF	GA	GD	Pts
1	University of Tasmania B (C)	18	16	0	2	82	27	+55	48
2	Beachside FC B	18	11	4	3	72	30	+42	37
3	Taroona B	19	10	4	5	67	29	+38	34
4	Clarence United B	18	10	2	6	48	46	+2	32
5	Metro FC B	19	8	3	8	50	67	−17	27
6	Hobart United B	19	8	2	9	42	43	−1	26
7	New Town Eagles B	18	5	3	10	33	63	−30	18
8	Southern FC B	19	3	2	14	41	56	−15	11
9	Nelson Eastern Suburbs B	16	0	2	14	11	85	−74	2

(C) Champions

=== 2015 Tasmanian League Two ===
==== 2015 Northern League Two ====
Northern League Two
- Season: 2015

The 2015 Northern League Two was the third edition of the new Tasmanian League Two as the fourth level domestic association football competition in Tasmania (fifth level overall in Australia). 6 teams competed, all playing each other four times for a total of 20 matches. No teams were promoted or relegated this season.

Pos	Team	Pld	W	D	L	GF	GA	GD	Pts
1	Northern Rangers D (C)	19	12	5	2	83	20	+63	41
2	Devonport City D	18	11	3	4	60	27	+33	36
3	Riverside Olympic C	19	9	3	7	81	57	+24	30
4	Launceston City D	19	8	4	7	48	27	+21	28
5	Launceston United C	20	7	1	12	49	72	−23	22
6	Devonport Yellow	17	1	0	16	17	117	−100	3

(C) Champions

^{NB}Several matches were postponed and subsequently could not be played.

==== 2015 Southern League Two ====
Southern League Two
- Season: 2015

The 2015 Southern League Two was the third edition of the new Tasmanian League Two as the fourth level domestic association football competition in Tasmania (fifth level overall in Australia). 5 teams competed, all playing each other five times for a total of 20 matches. Derwent United were selected to join the Southern Championship at the end of the season.

Pos	Team	Pld	W	D	L	GF	GA	GD	Pts	Qualification or relegation
1	Olympia B (C)	19	16	2	1	117	15	+102	50	
2	University of Tasmania B	19	10	2	7	59	41	+18	32	
3	Derwent United (P)	20	9	2	9	57	65	−8	29	Promoted to the 2016 Southern Championship
4	South Hobart B	19	6	1	12	35	65	−30	19	
5	South East United	19	4	3	12	34	78	−44	15	

(C) Champions; (P) Promoted

^{NB}Two matches were postponed and subsequently could not be played.

=== 2015 Tasmanian League Three ===
==== 2015 Southern League Three ====
Southern League Three
- Season: 2015
- Matches: 72
- Goals: 365 (5.07 per match)

The 2015 Southern League Three was the third edition of the new Tasmanian League Three as the fifth level domestic association football competition in Tasmania (sixth level overall in Australia). 9 teams competed, all playing each other twice during a total of 16 matches.

Pos	Team	Pld	W	D	L	GF	GA	GD	Pts
1	Phoenix Rovers (C)	16	13	1	2	65	20	+45	40
2	Kingborough Black	16	9	5	2	46	22	+24	32
3	Kingborough Blue	16	10	2	4	53	33	+20	32
4	Olympia B	16	8	2	6	44	33	+11	26
5	Beachside Black	16	7	2	7	34	35	−1	23
6	Glenorchy Knights B	16	6	2	8	39	40	−1	20
7	Beachside Originals	16	6	0	10	33	53	−20	18
8	New Town Eagles C	16	4	2	10	29	53	−24	14
9	South East United B	16	1	0	15	22	61	−39	3

(C) Champions

=== 2015 Tasmanian League Four ===
==== 2015 Southern League Four ====
Southern League Four
- Season: 2015
- Matches: 90
- Goals: 608 (6.76 per match)

The 2015 Southern League Four was the third edition of the new Tasmanian League Four as the sixth level domestic association football competition in Tasmania (seventh level overall in Australia). 10 teams competed, all playing each other twice for a total of 18 rounds.

Pos	Team	Pld	W	D	L	GF	GA	GD	Pts
1	Metro Blue (C)	18	15	2	1	114	24	+90	47
2	University Dynamo	18	14	1	3	75	11	+64	43
3	South Hobart C	18	11	2	5	58	46	+12	35
4	Huon Valley	18	10	4	4	69	22	+47	34
5	Kingborough Lions United D	18	9	3	6	60	38	+22	30
6	Derwent United B	18	8	4	6	84	49	+35	28
7	Taroona C	18	7	2	9	53	49	+4	23
8	South East United C	18	2	2	14	35	126	−91	8
9	New Norfolk	18	2	2	14	24	117	−93	8
10	Metro Gold	18	0	2	16	28	128	−100	2

(C) Champions

=== 2015 Tasmanian League Five ===
==== 2015 Southern League Five ====
Southern League Five
- Season: 2015
- Matches: 90
- Goals: 302 (3.36 per match)

The 2015 Southern League Five was the first edition of the new Tasmanian League Five as the seventh level domestic association football competition in Tasmania (eighth level overall in Australia). 7 teams competed, all playing each other three times, for a total of 18 rounds.

Pos	Team	Pld	W	D	L	GF	GA	GD	Pts
1	University Wanderers (C)	18	11	3	4	68	21	+47	36
2	Barnstoneworth Golden Gordons	18	9	4	5	62	31	+31	31
3	Southern FC C	18	9	4	5	44	33	+11	31
4	Cygnet Town	18	8	5	5	41	23	+18	29
5	Taroona D	18	8	5	5	43	34	+9	29
6	Barnstoneworth Scrappers	18	4	3	11	29	53	−24	15
7	DOSA SC	18	1	2	15	15	104	−89	5

(C) Champions

== Women's Competition ==
=== 2015 Northern Championship ===
Women's Northern Championship
- Season: 2015
- Premiers: Ulverstone

Pos	Team	Pld	W	D	L	GF	GA	GD	Pts	Qualification or relegation
1	Ulverstone (P)	21	20	1	0	161	15	+146	61	2015 Statewide Finals series, and Promoted to the 2016 Women's Super League
2	Launceston City (P)	21	17	2	2	167	31	+136	53	2015 Statewide Finals series, and Promoted to the 2016 Women's Super League
3	Launceston United	21	14	1	6	116	54	+62	43	
3	Devonport	21	10	2	9	112	93	+19	32	
1	Riverside Olympic	21	10	0	11	72	81	−9	30	
1	Northern Rangers	21	5	1	15	58	76	−18	16	
6	Somerset	21	4	1	16	44	119	−75	13	
7	Burnie United	21	0	0	21	2	254	−252	0	

Source: sportstg.com
Rules for classification: 1) points; 2) goal difference; 3) number of goals scored.
(P) Promoted

=== 2015 Southern Championship ===
Women's Southern Championship
- Season: 2015
- Champions: NTC
- Premiers: NTC

Pos	Team	Pld	W	D	L	GF	GA	GD	Pts	Qualification or relegation
1	NTC (C)	18	14	3	1	101	21	+80	45	2015 Statewide Finals series
2	Hobart Zebras (P)	18	11	2	5	46	31	+15	35	2015 Statewide Finals series, and Promoted to the 2016 Women's Super League
3	University of Tasmania (P)	18	7	4	7	29	32	−3	25	Promoted to the 2016 Women's Super League
4	Clarence United (P)	18	7	3	8	35	37	−2	24	Promoted to the 2016 Women's Super League
5	Taroona (P)	18	7	2	9	42	39	+3	23	Promoted to the 2016 Women's Super League
6	Olympia (P)	18	7	2	9	57	73	−16	23	Promoted to the 2016 Women's Super League
7	Glenorchy Knights	18	1	2	15	17	88	−71	5	

Source: sportstg.com
Rules for classification: 1) points; 2) goal difference; 3) number of goals scored.
(C) Champions; (P) Promoted

=== 2015 Statewide Finals series ===
Semifinals
S1	NTC	7
N2	Launceston City	4
N1	Ulverstone	6
S2	Hobart Zebras	4

Finals
S1	NTC	8
N1	Ulverstone	3

== Cup Competitions ==
Competition	Winners	Score	Runners-up
Milan Lakoseljac Cup	Kingborough Lions United	0–4	South Hobart
Women's State Wide Cup	Launceston City	2–1	Ulverstone
State Wide Social Vase	Olympia	9–0	Launceston City

The Milan Lakoseljac Cup competition also served as the Tasmanian Preliminary rounds for the 2015 FFA Cup. South Hobart entered at the Round of 32, where they were eliminated.
