= Tomislav Uskok =

Australian soccer player

Tomi Uskok
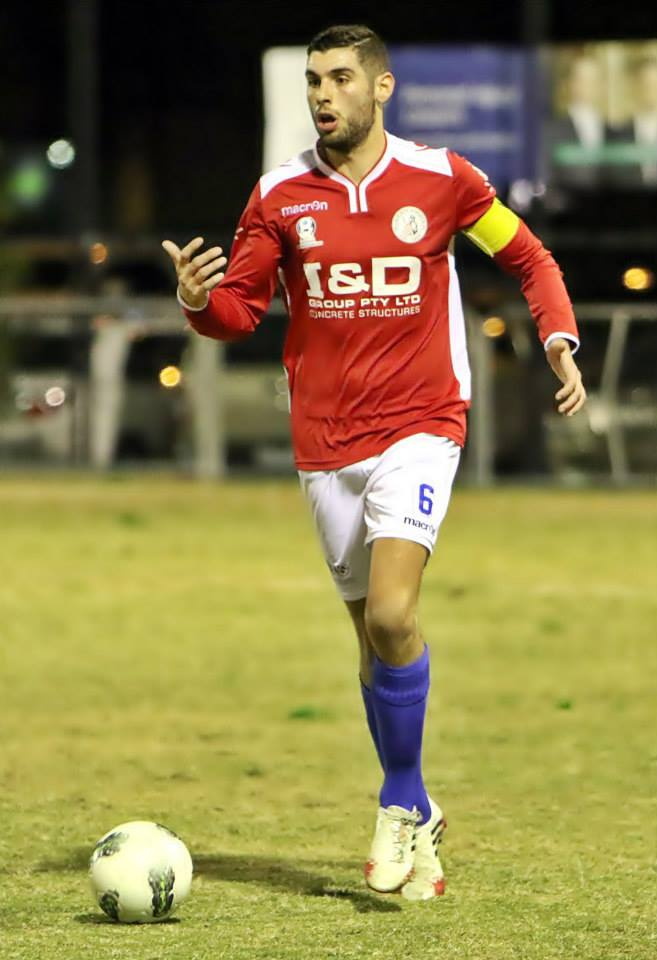
- Uskok on the ball with Melbourne Knights in 2015

Personal information
- Date of birth: 22 June 1991 (age 35)
- Place of birth: Williamstown, Victoria, Australia
- Height: 1.96 m (6 ft 5 in)
- Position: Central defender

Team information
- Current team: Bankstown City Lions
- Number: 4

Youth career
- Melbourne Knights

Senior career*
Years	Team	Apps	(Gls)
2009–2010	Richmond SC	16	(0)
2010–2011	St Albans Saints	19	(1)
2011–2015	Melbourne Knights	86	(7)
2015–2016	Central Coast Mariners	6	(0)
2016–2017	Sydney United	34	(1)
2017–2019	Melbourne Knights	41	(14)
2019–2020	Sydney United	13	(1)
2020–2021	Western United	33	(2)
2021–2026	Macarthur FC	112	(9)
2026–	Bankstown City Lions	6	(1)
- * Club domestic league appearances and goals as of 7 August 2026

Tomislav Uskok (Croatian: [tǒmislaʋ ûskok]; born 22 July 1991) is an Australian professional soccer player who played as a centre-back for Bankstown City Lions in the NSW League One.

== Career ==
=== Early years ===
Uskok came through the junior ranks at local club Melbourne Knights. He departed the club in 2009 in search of first team football, subsequently joining Victorian Premier League side Richmond SC. With first team opportunities scarce for the 18-year-old, he then joined Victorian State League Division 1 side St Albans Saints for the second half of the 2010 season.

=== Melbourne Knights ===
In 2011, Uskok returned to Melbourne Knights. In 2014, Uskok scored in a 2–0 win over traditional rivals South Melbourne, a win that saw the Knights qualify for the Round of 32 of the 2014 FFA Cup. Uskok went on to score a 120th-minute winner in the 2014 Dockerty Cup final, as Melbourne Knights beat South Springvale SC to claim their first piece of major since 1996.

In February 2015, Uskok was handed the captaincy at his boyhood club, stating "It's a great honour and a privilege." Uskok departed Knights in September 2015, as he relocated to Sydney, and was set to join a club in the National Premier Leagues NSW in 2016, before his career took a turn.

=== Central Coast Mariners ===
Uskok signed for A-League club Central Coast Mariners on 23 November 2015, as the club sought a replacement to the recently released Eddy Bosnar. The contract was to end in June 2016 and was the 24-year-old's first shot at professional football.

Uskok made his competitive first team debut for Central Coast Mariners in their home clash against Melbourne City on 3 December 2015. The former Knights captain made his starting debut in Round 15, playing the full 90 minutes as his side went down 3–1 to Adelaide United. Uskok was named in the A-League team of the week in Central Coast's 2–0 loss to Melbourne Victory, a match in which he made a very good showing, keeping marquee Victory striker Besart Berisha quiet.

On 11 April 2016, Uskok was released by the Mariners after making seven appearances in his time at the club.

=== Sydney United 58 ===
On 15 April 2016, National Premier Leagues NSW club Sydney United 58 announced that they had signed the imposing central defender for the remainder of the 2016 NPL NSW season. Uskok scored on debut for Sydney United in a 3–0 win over Blacktown Spartans on 16 April 2016, coming on as a substitute to tuck in the third goal. On 10 July 2016, Uskok claimed the 2016 Waratah Cup with United, achieving an 8.5 match rating from FourFourTwo Australia.

=== Return to Melbourne Knights ===
Uskok returned to Melbourne Knights for the 2018 season.

=== Return to Sydney United 58 ===
Uskok departed Melbourne Knights midway through the 2019 season and re-signed with Sydney United in National Premier Leagues NSW.

=== Western United ===
Uskok joined A-League club Western United FC in January 2020 as their second signing for that month. Uskok scored his first A-League goal in a 2–1 derby win over Melbourne Victory FC. Prior to his second season with Western United, he was named the club's vice-captain. Manager Marko Rudan commented: "Tomi came in halfway through the season and he was an exceptional leader for us, a great communicator. He’s one for the future as far as we’re concerned, we can build a club around Tomi. In a very short space of time he’s got the respect of all the players and the coaching staff as well."

=== Macarthur FC ===
Uskok joined A-League club Macarthur FC on a two-year contract in July 2021. In May 2026, Uskok leave Macarthur FC.

== Honours ==
Melbourne Knights

- Dockerty Cup: 2014

Sydney United

- National Premier Leagues: 2016
- National Premier Leagues NSW Premiership: 2016
- Waratah Cup: 2016

Macarthur

- Australia Cup: 2022, 2024
