= 2016 Football Federation Tasmania season =

Football Federation Tasmania
- Season: 2016

The Football Federation Tasmania 2016 season was the fourth season under the new competition format in Tasmania. The competition consisted of three major divisions across the State of Tasmania, created from the teams in the previous structure. The overall premier for the new structure qualified for the National Premier Leagues finals series, competing with the other state federation champions in a final knock-out tournament to decide the National Premier Leagues Champion for 2016.

== Men's Competitions ==
=== 2016 NPL Tasmania ===
NPL Tasmania
- Season: 2016
- Champions: Devonport City
- Matches: 84
- Goals: 362 (4.31 per match)
- Top goalscorer: Brayden Mann (24 goals)
- Biggest home win: South Hobart 12–0 Northern Rangers (2 April 2016)
- Biggest away win: Launceston City 0–10 South Hobart (9 April 2016)
- Highest scoring: South Hobart 12–0 Northern Rangers (2 April 2016)

The 2016 NPL Tasmania season was played as a triple round-robin over 21 rounds.

Pos	Team	Pld	W	D	L	GF	GA	GD	Pts	Qualification or relegation
1	Devonport City (C)	21	19	1	1	61	10	+51	58	2016 National Premier Leagues Finals
2	Hobart Zebras	21	16	2	3	62	27	+35	50	2016 League Cup
3	South Hobart	21	15	3	3	87	21	+66	48	2016 League Cup
4	Olympia	21	9	0	12	51	47	+4	27	2016 League Cup
5	Launceston City	21	7	2	12	24	58	−34	23	2016 League Cup
6	Kingborough Lions United	21	6	3	12	34	53	−19	21	2016 League Cup
7	Clarence United	21	3	2	16	23	71	−48	11	
8	Northern Rangers	21	1	3	17	20	75	−55	6	

Source: foxsportspulse.com
Rules for classification: 1) points; 2) goal difference; 3) number of goals scored.
(C) Champions

==== League Cup ====
The end of season finals series for the League Cup was held using the same format as the previous year, which included the top six teams from the NPL Tasmania as well as the premiers from the Northern Championship (Somerset) and Southern Championship (Glenorchy Knights). The quarter-final and semi-final matches were decided by random draw. The competition was formerly known as the Victory Cup, but was renamed due to lapsing sponsorship arrangements.

Quarter-finals
Devonport City	4
Olympia	0
Hobart Zebras	4
Somerset	0
South Hobart	3
Glenorchy Knights	2
Kingborough Lions United	2
Launceston City	1

Semi-finals
Devonport City	4
Hobart Zebras	1
South Hobart	2
Kingborough Lions United	0

Grand final
Devonport City	2
South Hobart	6

=== 2016 Tasmanian Championships ===
==== 2016 Northern Championship ====
Northern Championship
- Season: 2016
- Matches: 84
- Goals: 361 (4.3 per match)
- Top goalscorer: Sam Hamilton (10 goals)
- Biggest home win: Launceston City B 9-1 Burnie United (19 March 2016)
- Biggest away win: Burnie United 1-5 Somerset (7 May 2016)
- Highest scoring: Launceston City B 9-1 Burnie United (19 March 2016)

The 2016 Northern Championship was the third edition of the Northern Championship as the second level domestic association football competition in Tasmania (third level overall in Australia). The league was played as a triple round-robin over 21 rounds. The highest placed team - other than those that also play in the NPL - qualified for the League Cup finals series.

Pos	Team	Pld	W	D	L	GF	GA	GD	Pts	Qualification or relegation
1	Devonport City B	21	14	3	4	63	27	+36	45	
2	Somerset	21	13	2	6	56	31	+25	41	2016 League Cup
3	Launceston City B	21	12	3	6	62	38	+24	39	
4	Launceston United	21	11	2	8	51	47	+4	35	
5	Ulverstone	21	10	2	9	36	30	+6	32	
6	Riverside Olympic	21	8	2	11	38	47	−9	26	
7	Northern Rangers B	21	6	2	13	30	46	−16	20	
8	Burnie United	21	2	0	19	25	95	−70	6	

Source: foxsportspulse.com
Rules for classification: 1) points; 2) goal difference; 3) number of goals scored.

==== 2016 Southern Championship ====
Southern Championship
- Season: 2016
- Matches: 71
- Goals: 318 (4.48 per match)
- Top goalscorer: Ethan Engels (25 goals)
- Biggest home win: Glenorchy Knights 11-1 New Town Eagles (15 April 2016)
- Biggest away win: Derwent United 0-9 Glenorchy Knights (7 May 2016)
- Highest scoring: Glenorchy Knights 11-1 New Town Eagles (15 April 2016)

The 2016 Southern Championship was the third edition of the Southern Championship as the second level domestic association football competition in Tasmania (third level overall in Australia). The league was played as a double round-robin over 16 rounds. The highest placed team - other than those that also play in the NPL - qualified for the League Cup finals series.

Pos	Team	Pld	W	D	L	GF	GA	GD	Pts	Qualification or relegation
1	Glenorchy Knights	16	13	2	1	66	11	+55	41	2016 League Cup
2	Beachside	16	11	1	4	34	27	+7	34	
3	University of Tasmania	16	11	0	5	58	16	+42	33	
4	Hobart United	16	9	3	4	38	23	+15	30	
5	Taroona	15	7	2	6	33	23	+10	23	
6	New Town Eagles	16	5	3	8	28	44	−16	18	
7	Metro FC	16	5	1	10	27	47	−20	16	
8	Southern FC	15	1	3	11	19	55	−36	6	
9	Nelson Eastern Suburbs	16	1	1	14	15	72	−57	4	
10	Derwent United	0	0	0	0	0	0	0	0	Withdrew

Source: foxsportspulse.com
Rules for classification: 1) points; 2) goal difference; 3) number of goals scored.

=== 2016 Tasmanian Championship One ===
==== 2016 Northern Championship One ====
Northern Championship One
- Season: 2016
- Top goalscorer: Rhys Kinslow (11 goals)
- Biggest home win: Launceston United B 8-1 Burnie United B (16 April 2016)
- Biggest away win: Ulverstone B 2-7 Riverside Olympic B (30 April 2016)
- Highest scoring: Devonport City C 7-4 Ulverstone B (20 March 2016)

The 2016 Northern Championship One was the third edition of the Northern Championship One as the third level domestic association football competition in Tasmania (fourth level overall in Australia). The league was played as a triple round-robin over 21 rounds.

Pos	Team	Pld	W	D	L	GF	GA	GD	Pts
1	Riverside Olympic B (C)	21	17	2	2	92	32	+60	53
2	Launceston City C	21	16	2	3	84	26	+58	50
3	Devonport City C	21	12	4	5	70	30	+40	40
4	Burnie United B	21	9	3	9	42	60	−18	30
5	Launceston United B	21	8	3	10	59	61	−2	27
6	Northern Rangers C	21	5	2	14	35	66	−31	17
7	Somerset B	21	5	2	14	42	96	−54	17
8	Ulverstone B	21	1	4	16	34	87	−53	7

Source: foxsportspulse.com
Rules for classification: 1) points; 2) goal difference; 3) number of goals scored.
(C) Champions

==== 2016 Southern Championship One ====
Southern Championship One
- Season: 2016
- Top goalscorer: Trent Knight (26 goals)
- Biggest home win: Hobart United B 10–2 Derwent United B (16 April 2016)
- Biggest away win: Derwent United B 2–11 Glenorchy Knights B (7 May 2016)
- Highest scoring: Derwent United B 2–11 Glenorchy Knights B (7 May 2016)

The 2016 Southern Championship One was the third edition of the Southern Championship One as the third level domestic association football competition in Tasmania (fourth level overall in Australia). The league was played as a double round-robin over 18 rounds.

Pos	Team	Pld	W	D	L	GF	GA	GD	Pts
1	Beachside B (C)	18	15	1	2	94	26	+68	46
2	Taroona B	18	14	0	4	70	20	+50	42
3	Southern FC B	18	12	0	6	45	35	+10	36
4	Hobart United B	18	10	2	6	52	43	+9	32
5	Glenorchy Knights B	18	9	1	8	59	43	+16	28
6	Metro FC B	18	9	0	9	64	39	+25	27
7	University B	18	7	2	9	41	65	−24	23
8	New Town Eagles B	18	6	3	9	43	51	−8	21
9	Derwent United B	18	3	1	14	8	33	−25	10
10	Nelson Eastern Suburbs B	18	0	0	18	10	87	−77	0

Source: foxsportspulse.com
Rules for classification: 1) points; 2) goal difference; 3) number of goals scored.
(C) Champions

=== 2016 Tasmanian League Two ===
==== 2016 Northern League Two ====
Northern League Two
- Season: 2016
- Top goalscorer: Aaron McAndrew (7 goals)
- Biggest home win: Riverside Olympic C 6–2 Northern Rangers D (24 April 2016)
- Biggest away win: Launceston United C 0–8 Launceston City D (17) April 2016)
- Highest scoring: Riverside Olympic C 6–2 Northern Rangers D (24 April 2016)

The 2016 Northern League Two was the third edition of the Northern League Two as the Fourth level domestic association football competition in Tasmania (fifth level overall in Australia). The league was played as a quintuple round-robin over 20 rounds.

Pos	Team	Pld	W	D	L	GF	GA	GD	Pts
1	Launceston City D	4	4	0	0	18	5	+13	12
2	Devonport City D	3	2	0	1	8	6	+2	6
3	Riverside Olympic C	3	1	1	1	12	10	+2	4
4	Northern Rangers D	5	1	1	3	7	12	−5	4
5	Launceston United C	5	0	2	3	7	19	−12	2

Source: foxsportspulse.com
Rules for classification: 1) points; 2) goal difference; 3) number of goals scored.

== Women's Competitions ==
=== 2016 Women's Super League ===
Women's Super League
- Season: 2016
- Champions: Olympia
- Matches: 42
- Goals: 208 (4.95 per match)
- Top goalscorer: Jazmin Gorrie (14 goals)
- Biggest home win: Launceston City 13-0 Clarence United (27 August 2016)
- Biggest away win: Taroona 0-8 Olympia (31 July 2016) University of Tasmania 0-8 Launceston City (3 September 2016)
- Highest scoring: Launceston City 13-0 Clarence United (27 August 2016)

The 2016 Women's Super League season was the first edition of a statewide Tasmanian women's association football league. The league was played as a double round-robin over 14 rounds.

Pos	Team	Pld	W	D	L	GF	GA	GD	Pts
1	Olympia (C)	12	10	1	1	58	16	+42	31
2	Launceston City	12	9	0	3	55	21	+34	27
5	Hobart Zebras	12	6	1	5	27	20	+7	19
3	University of Tasmania	12	5	1	6	16	31	−15	16
4	Ulverstone	12	3	2	7	18	33	−15	11
6	Taroona	12	3	0	9	21	46	−25	9
7	Clarence United	12	2	3	7	13	41	−28	9

Source: sportstg.com
Rules for classification: 1) points; 2) goal difference; 3) number of goals scored.
(C) Champions

== Cup Competitions ==
Competition	Winners	Score	Runners-up
Milan Lakoseljac Cup	South Hobart	0–1	Devonport City
Women's State Wide Cup			
State Wide Social Vase	Olympia	3–2	University of Tasmania

The Milan Lakoseljac Cup competition also served as the Tasmanian Preliminary Rounds for the 2016 FFA Cup. Devonport City entered at the Round of 32, and were eliminated in the Round of 16.
