= Yutaro Shin =

Japanese footballer

Personal information
- Full name: Yutaro Shin
- Date of birth: March 11, 1990 (age 36)
- Place of birth: Saitama, Japan
- Height: 1.75 m (5 ft 9 in)
- Position: Forward

Youth career
- 2008–2011: Aoyama Gakuin University

Senior career*
Years	Team	Apps	(Gls)
2012–2014	Fukushima United	24	(1)
2015	Azul Claro Numazu	25	(1)
2016–2017	Sydney United 58	45	(6)
2018	Master 7 FC		
2019	Melbourne Knights FC	0	(0)
- * Club domestic league appearances and goals as of 16 September 2025

Yutaro Shin (新 裕太朗, Shin Yūtarō; born March 11, 1990) is a Japanese football player, who last played for Melbourne Knights in the National Premier Leagues Victoria.

== Playing career ==
Yutaro Shin played for Fukushima United FC and Azul Claro Numazu from 2012 to 2015.

In 2016, Yutaro joined NPL NSW side Sydney United 58 in Australia, in which he won the NPL Championship, the NPL NSW Premiership, and the Waratah Cup in which he scored the winning goal in the 1-0 win over Manly United in the final.

In May 2018, Yutaro signed with Master 7 FC in the Lao Premier League.

In January 2019, Shin returned to Australia, signing for National Premier Leagues Victoria side Melbourne Knights.

== Honours ==
Sydney United 58

- Waratah Cup: 2016
- National Premier Leagues NSW Premiership: 2016
- National Premier Leagues Championship: 2016
