= 2017 Football NSW season =

Football New South Wales
- Season: 2017
- Champions: Manly United

The Football NSW 2017 season was the fifth season of football in New South Wales under the banner of the National Premier Leagues. The competition consisted of four divisions across the state of New South Wales. The Premiers of the NPL NSW Men's 1 qualified for the national finals, playing-off to decide the champion of the 2017 National Premier Leagues.

== League Tables ==
=== 2017 National Premier League NSW Men's 1 ===
NPL NSW Men's 1
- Season: 2017
- Champions: Manly United
- Premiers: APIA Leichhardt
- Relegated: Parramatta FC
- Matches: 132
- Goals: 434 (3.29 per match)
- Top goalscorer: Jordan Figon (14 goals)
- Biggest home win: Manly United 5–3 Bonnyrigg White Eagles (19 March 2017); Sydney Olympic 3–1 Wollongong Wolves (19 March 2017)
- Biggest away win: Rockdale City Suns 0–4 Blacktown City (7 May 2017)
- Highest scoring: Manly United 5–3 Bonnyrigg White Eagles (19 March 2017)

The National Premier League New South Wales 2017 season was played over 22 rounds, with the regular season from March to August 2017.

Pos	Team	Pld	W	D	L	GF	GA	GD	Pts	Qualification or relegation
1	APIA Leichhardt Tigers	22	16	1	5	50	18	+32	49	2017 National Premier Leagues Finals
2	Blacktown City	22	14	5	3	45	22	+23	47	2017 NSW Finals
3	Rockdale City Suns	22	12	6	4	42	28	+14	42	2017 NSW Finals
4	Manly United (C)	22	13	3	6	47	36	+11	42	2017 NSW Finals
5	Sydney Olympic	22	12	4	6	35	23	+12	40	2017 NSW Finals
6	Wollongong Wolves	22	12	1	9	35	28	+7	37	
7	Sydney United 58	22	10	4	8	42	27	+15	34	
8	Hakoah Sydney City East	22	6	6	10	28	35	−7	24	
9	Bonnyrigg White Eagles	22	5	4	13	31	50	−19	19	
10	Sutherland Sharks	22	5	1	16	29	55	−26	16	
11	Sydney FC Youth	22	6	2	14	34	52	−18	14 (Note: Sydney FC Youth six points deducted for misconduct.)	
12	Parramatta FC (R)	22	1	3	18	16	60	−44	6	Relegation to the 2018 NPL NSW 2 (Note: Promotion and Relegation system based on Club Championship and including points from U20 and U18 teams.)

Source: sportstg.com
Rules for classification: 1) points; 2) goal difference; 3) number of goals scored.
(C) Champions; (R) Relegated

==== Finals ====
Qualifying final
2	Blacktown City	2
3	Rockdale City	4
4	Manly United	2
5	Sydney Olympic	1

Major semi-final
1	APIA Leichhardt	5
3	Rockdale City	0
Minor semi-final
2	Blacktown City	0
4	Manly United	2

Preliminary final
3	Rockdale City	2 (4)
4	Manly United	2 (5)

Grand final
1	APIA Leichhardt	0 (3)
4	Manly United	0 (4)

==== Top scorers ====
As of matches played on 13 August 2017

Rank	Player	Club	Goals
1	(Australia) Jordan Figon	Rockdale City Suns	14
2	(Japan) Tomohiro Kajiyama	Sutherland Sharks	13
2	(Australia) Jordan Murray	APIA Leichhardt Tigers	13
2	(Australia) Panagiotis Nikas	Sydney United 58	13
5	(Australia) Joey Gibbs	Blacktown City	12
5	(Australia) Alec Urosevski	Rockdale City Suns	12
7	(Australia) James Andrew	Blacktown City	11
7	(Japan) Yu Kuboki	Sydney Olympic	11
9	(Australia) Sean Symons	APIA Leichhardt Tigers	10
9	(Japan) Yūzō Tashiro	Wollongong Wolves	10

=== 2017 National Premier League NSW Men's 2 ===
NPL NSW Men's 2
- Season: 2017
- Champions: Marconi Stallions
- Promoted: Marconi Stallions

The 2017 National Premier League NSW Men's 2 was the fifth edition of the NPL NSW 2 as the second level domestic association football competition in New South Wales. 14 teams competed, playing each other twice for a total of 26 rounds, with the top team at the end of the year promoted to the NPL NSW Men's 1 competition.

Pos	Team	Pld	W	D	L	GF	GA	GD	Pts	Qualification or relegation
1	Marconi Stallions (C, P)	26	20	2	4	70	29	+41	62	Promotion to the 2018 National Premier Leagues (Note: Promotion and Relegation system based on Club Championship and including points from U20 and U18 teams.)
2	St George	26	14	2	10	56	50	+6	44	Qualification for the 2017 NPL NSW Men's 2 Finals
3	Mt Druitt Town Rangers	26	12	5	9	50	42	+8	41	Qualification for the 2017 NPL NSW Men's 2 Finals
4	Central Coast Mariners Academy	26	12	4	10	70	49	+21	40	Qualification for the 2017 NPL NSW Men's 2 Finals
5	North Shore Mariners	26	11	7	8	51	39	+12	40	Qualification for the 2017 NPL NSW Men's 2 Finals
6	Northern Tigers	26	11	7	8	49	43	+6	40	Qualification for the 2017 NPL NSW Men's 2 Finals
7	Western Sydney Wanderers Youth	26	11	5	10	52	54	−2	38	
8	Mounties Wanderers	26	11	4	11	50	44	+6	37	
9	Spirit FC	26	10	5	11	39	45	−6	35	
10	Bankstown Berries	26	9	6	11	40	45	−5	33	
11	Hills United	26	9	5	12	53	58	−5	32	
12	Blacktown Spartans	26	9	3	14	47	60	−13	30	
13	Macarthur Rams	26	9	2	15	38	58	−20	29	
14	Bankstown City (R)	26	5	1	20	32	81	−49	16	Relegation to the 2018 NPL NSW 3

Source: nswpl.com.au
Rules for classification: 1) points; 2) goal difference; 3) number of goals scored.
(C) Champions; (P) Promoted; (R) Relegated

==== Finals ====
Elimination finals
4	Central Coast Mariners Academy	1
5	North Shore Mariners	3
3	Mt Druitt Town Rangers	1 (4)
6	Northern Tigers	1 (3)

Semi-finals
1	Marconi Stallions	2
5	North Shore Mariners	1
2	St George	2
3	Mt Druitt Town Rangers	4

Grand final
1	Marconi Stallions	5
3	Mt Druitt Town Rangers	1

=== 2017 National Premier League NSW Men's 3 ===
NPL NSW Men's 3
- Season: 2017

The 2017 National Premier League NSW Men's 3 was the fifth edition of the NPL NSW Men's 3 under the National Premier Leagues banner. 14 teams competed, playing each other twice for a total of 26 rounds.

Pos	Team	Pld	W	D	L	GF	GA	GD	Pts	Qualification or relegation
1	Rydalmere Lions (P)	26	22	1	3	95	33	+62	67	Promotion to the 2018 NPL NSW 2 (Note: Promotion and Relegation system based on Club Championship and including points from U20 and U18 teams.)
2	Fraser Park	26	21	2	3	81	19	+62	65	Qualification for the 2017 NPL NSW Men's 3 Finals
3	St George FA	26	15	4	7	67	35	+32	49	Qualification for the 2017 NPL NSW Men's 3 Finals
4	Dulwich Hill	26	15	3	8	70	45	+25	48	Qualification for the 2017 NPL NSW Men's 3 Finals
5	SD Raiders	26	11	8	7	48	38	+10	41	Qualification for the 2017 NPL NSW Men's 3 Finals
6	Gladesville Ryde Magic	26	10	9	7	46	34	+12	39	Qualification for the 2017 NPL NSW Men's 3 Finals
7	Hawkesbury City	26	11	6	9	51	43	+8	39	
8	Sydney University	26	12	2	12	53	53	0	38	
9	Dunbar Rovers	26	7	8	11	59	52	+7	29	
10	Stanmore Hawks	26	8	3	15	34	59	−25	27	
11	Granville Rage	26	6	8	12	28	39	−11	26	
12	Western NSW Mariners	26	4	5	17	24	80	−56	17	
13	Inter Lions	26	5	1	20	29	108	−79	16	
14	Balmain Tigers	26	2	6	18	30	77	−47	12	Relegation to 2018 NSW State League

Source: nswpl.com.au
Rules for classification: 1) points; 2) goal difference; 3) number of goals scored.
(P) Promoted

==== Finals ====
Elimination finals
4	Dulwich Hill	0
5	SD Raiders	1
3	St George City	2
6	Gladesville Ryde Magic	1

Semi-finals
1	Rydalmere Lions	4
5	SD Raiders	2
2	Fraser Park	3
3	St George City	0

Grand final
1	Rydalmere Lions	1
2	Fraser Park	2

=== 2017 NSW State League ===
NSW State League
- Season: 2017
- Champions: Camden Tigers

The 2017 NSW State League was the fifth edition of the State League under the National Premier Leagues banner. 10 teams competed, playing each other twice for a total of 18 matches.

Pos	Team	Pld	W	D	L	GF	GA	GD	Pts	Qualification or relegation
1	Bankstown United	18	14	0	4	49	17	+32	42	Qualification for the 2017 NSW State League Finals
2	Camden Tigers (P)	18	12	4	2	58	31	+27	40	Promotion to the 2018 NPL NSW 3 (Note: Promotion and Relegation system based on Club Championship and including points from U20 and U18 teams.)
3	Nepean FC	18	11	2	5	36	19	+17	35	Qualification for the 2017 NSW State League Finals
4	Hurstville	18	11	2	5	35	18	+17	35	Qualification for the 2017 NSW State League Finals
5	University of NSW	18	11	1	6	49	32	+17	34	
6	Prospect United	18	9	2	7	37	32	+5	29	
7	Hurstville City Minotaurs	18	7	2	9	36	30	+6	23	
8	Western Condors	18	3	1	14	17	59	−42	10	
9	FC Gazy Lansvale	18	2	1	15	22	58	−36	7	
10	Wagga City Wanderers	18	2	1	15	17	60	−43	7	

Source: sportstg.com
Rules for classification: 1) points; 2) goal difference; 3) number of goals scored.
(P) Promoted

==== Finals ====
Semi-finals
1	Bankstown United	4
2	Camden Tigers	1
3	Nepean FC	5
4	Hurstville	2

Preliminary final
2	Camden Tigers	2
3	Nepean FC	0

Grand final
1	Bankstown United	2
2	Camden Tigers (a.e.t.)	4

=== 2017 National Premier Leagues NSW Women's 1 ===
National Premier Leagues NSW Women's 1
- Season: 2017
- Champions: Manly United
- Premiers: Macarthur Rams

The 2017 National Premier League NSW Women's 1 was the fourth edition of the NPL NSW Women's competition to be incorporated under the National Premier Leagues banner. 10 teams competed, playing each other twice for a total of 18 rounds.

Pos	Team	Pld	W	D	L	GF	GA	GD	Pts	Qualification or relegation
1	Macarthur Rams	18	13	2	3	39	22	+17	41	Qualification for the 2017 NPL NSW Women's Finals
2	Manly United (C)	18	12	2	4	51	18	+33	38	Qualification for the 2017 NPL NSW Women's Finals
3	Illawarra Stingrays	18	11	3	4	61	35	+26	36	Qualification for the 2017 NPL NSW Women's Finals
4	Sydney University	18	10	4	4	46	21	+25	34	Qualification for the 2017 NPL NSW Women's Finals
5	North Shore Mariners	18	8	2	8	21	28	−7	26	
6	North West Sydney Koalas	18	6	5	7	31	23	+8	23	
7	Blacktown Spartans	18	7	1	10	32	46	−14	22	
8	Football NSW Institute	18	6	2	10	33	46	−13	20	
9	Northern Tigers	18	3	3	12	16	43	−27	12	
10	Emerging Jets	18	2	0	16	18	66	−48	6	

Source: sportstg.com
Rules for classification: 1) points; 2) goal difference; 3) number of goals scored.
(C) Champions

==== Finals ====
Semi-finals
1	Macarthur Rams	2
2	Manly United	3
3	Illawarra Stingrays	1
4	Sydney University	6

Preliminary final
Macarthur Rams	4
Sydney University	2

Grand final
Manly United	4
Macarthur Rams	3

== 2017 Waratah Cup ==
Football NSW soccer clubs competed in 2017 for the Waratah Cup. The tournament doubled as the NSW qualifier for the 2017 FFA Cup, with the top five clubs progressing to the Round of 32, as well as the reigning National Premier Leagues champion (Sydney United 58). 147 clubs entered the qualifying phase, with the clubs entering in a staggered format.

The competition was won by Hakoah Sydney City East, their 7th title, defeating APIA Leichhardt Tigers.

In addition to the three A-League clubs (Central Coast Mariners, Sydney FC and Western Sydney Wanderers), the six qualifiers (APIA Leichhardt Tigers, Bankstown Berries, Blacktown City, Hakoah Sydney City East, Hills Brumbies and Sydney United 58) competed in the final rounds of the 2017 FFA Cup.

== Awards ==
The end of year awards were presented at Oatlands House on 15 September 2017.

=== National Premier Leagues NSW ===
Award	Men's	Women's
Player of the Year	Sean Symons (APIA Leichhardt)	Remy Siemsen (Manly United)
Golden Boot	Panny Nikas (Sydney United – 13 goals) & Tomohiro Kajiyama (Sutherland Sharks – 13 goals)	Remy Siemsen (Manly United – 19 goals)
Coach of the Year	Danial Cummins (APIA Leichhardt)	Chris Williams (Manly United)
Goalkeeper of the Year	Ante Covic (Rockdale City Suns) & Paul Henderson (Sydney Olympic)	Shamiran Khamis (Macarthur Rams)
Goal of the Year	Panny Nikas (Sydney United)	—
Referee of the Year	Kurt Ams	Kelly Jones
U-20's Golden Boot	n/a	Ashlie Crofts (Blacktown Spartans – 15 goals) & Sophie Harding (Manly United – 15 goals)
U-20's Player of the Year	n/a	Tiegan Collister (North Shore Mariners)
Club Championship	Blacktown City	North West Sydney Koalas
Fair Play Award	Sydney FC Youth	Illawarra Stingrays & Manly United

=== Other awards ===
Charles Valentine Medal	Paul Smith – Sutherland Sharks
