= Glen Trifiro =

Australian soccer player

Personal information
- Full name: Glen Joseph Trifiro
- Date of birth: 10 July 1989 (age 37)
- Place of birth: Sydney, Australia
- Height: 1.74 m (5 ft 8 1/2 in)
- Position: Central midfielder

Youth career
- –2007: Marconi Stallions
- 2008–2009: CCM Academy
- 2009–2010: Perth Glory

Senior career*
Years	Team	Apps	(Gls)
2007–2008	Marconi Stallions		
2008	Macarthur Rams		
2009	Sydney United	15	(1)
2010	West Sydney Berries		
2011	Northcote City	19	(5)
2012	South Melbourne	21	(1)
2013–2014	Sydney United 58	24	(6)
2014	→ Central Coast Mariners (loan)	5	(1)
2014–2016	Central Coast Mariners	22	(1)
2016–2024	Sydney United 58	144	(22)

International career^{‡}
2007	Australia U20	1	(2)
- * Club domestic league appearances and goals as of 6 October 2023 ‡ National team caps and goals as of 21 February 2014

Glen Joseph Trifiro (born 10 July 1989) is an Australian former professional footballer who played as a central midfielder.

== Career ==
After playing for several years with various state league clubs in NSW and Victoria, Trifiro signed on loan from Sydney United with the Central Coast Mariners in the A-League during the January Transfer Window. Following impressive performances, he was handed a one-year contract to play on with the club into the next season. Trifiro became the first ever FFA Cup goalscorer for the Mariners in August 2014, scoring the only goal of the round of 32 game against South Coast Wolves.

Trifiro was released by the Mariners on 1 March 2016.

== Honours ==
With Sydney United:

- (Australia) National Premier Leagues NSW Championship: 2020
- (Australia) National Premier Leagues NSW Premiership: 2013, 2016
- (Australia) Waratah Cup: 2016, 2023

== Personal life ==
Glen is the brother of former Melbourne City midfielder Jason Trifiro.

The brothers run a football clinic called Futboltec. Its aims are to improve the technical aspects of young players' game, including passing, finishing, and overall awareness.
