= Danny Choi =

South Korean footballer (born 1994)

Personal information
- Full name: Danny Seung-Joo Choi
- Date of birth: 6 December 1994 (age 31)
- Place of birth: Suwon, South Korea
- Height: 1.80 m (5 ft 11 in)
- Position: Winger

Youth career
- 2010–2012: Daejeon Citizen

Senior career*
Years	Team	Apps	(Gls)
2013	Parramatta FC	8	(3)
2014–2018	Blacktown City	94	(28)
2016	→ Adelaide United (loan)	2	(0)
2018–2019	Oliveira do Hospital	19	(3)
2019–2020	União de Leiria	17	(4)
2020	Beira-Mar	6	(0)
2020–2021	Casa Pia	4	(0)
2021	→ Real SC (loan)	14	(1)
2021	Paredes	4	(1)
2021–2022	Canelas	7	(0)
2022–2025	Blacktown City	54	(9)
2026	Sutherland Sharks	27	(3)
- * Club domestic league appearances and goals as of 15 September 2026

Danny Seung-Joo Choi (born 6 December 1994) is a South Korean professional footballer who last played as a winger for Sutherland Sharks.

== Early life ==
Choi was raised in Suwon, South Korea before moving to Australia in fifth grade, and spent five years in the country before returning to South Korea to play for Daejeon Citizen. He returned to Australia three years later, where his family still lived and believing that his footballing style was better adapted to Australian competition.

== Club career ==
Choi's first senior club in Australia was Parramatta FC, where he was the side's Player of the Year in 2013.

On 27 July 2016, Choi scored a 70-metre goal from inside his own half in extra time to help Blacktown City to a win over Sydney United in the Round of 32 of the 2016 FFA Cup.

In October 2016, Choi signed with A-League club Adelaide United on an injury replacement contract for Marcelo Carrusca. He made his debut later in the month, hitting the post with a late shot in a loss to Melbourne Victory. His short-term injury replacement contract expired after Carrusca returned to the squad and Choi himself suffered a stress fracture in his foot.

Danny later played for six Portuguese clubs from 2018 to 2022, before returning to Blacktown City.

== Honours ==
Blacktown City

- National Premier Leagues: 2015
- National Premier Leagues NSW Championship: 2014, 2016
- National Premier Leagues NSW Premiership: 2014
- Waratah Cup: 2014

Individual

- Parramatta FC Player of the Year: 2013
