= Derwent United FC =

Derwent United
- Full name: Derwent United Football Club
- Founded: 2011
- Ground: Weily Park, Bridgewater
- 2015: 3rd (Promoted)
- Website: http://www.derwentunited.com.au/
| Home colours | Away colours |

Derwent United Football Club is an Australian association football club based in Bridgewater, Tasmania.
