= Panny Nikas =

Australian soccer player (born 1988)

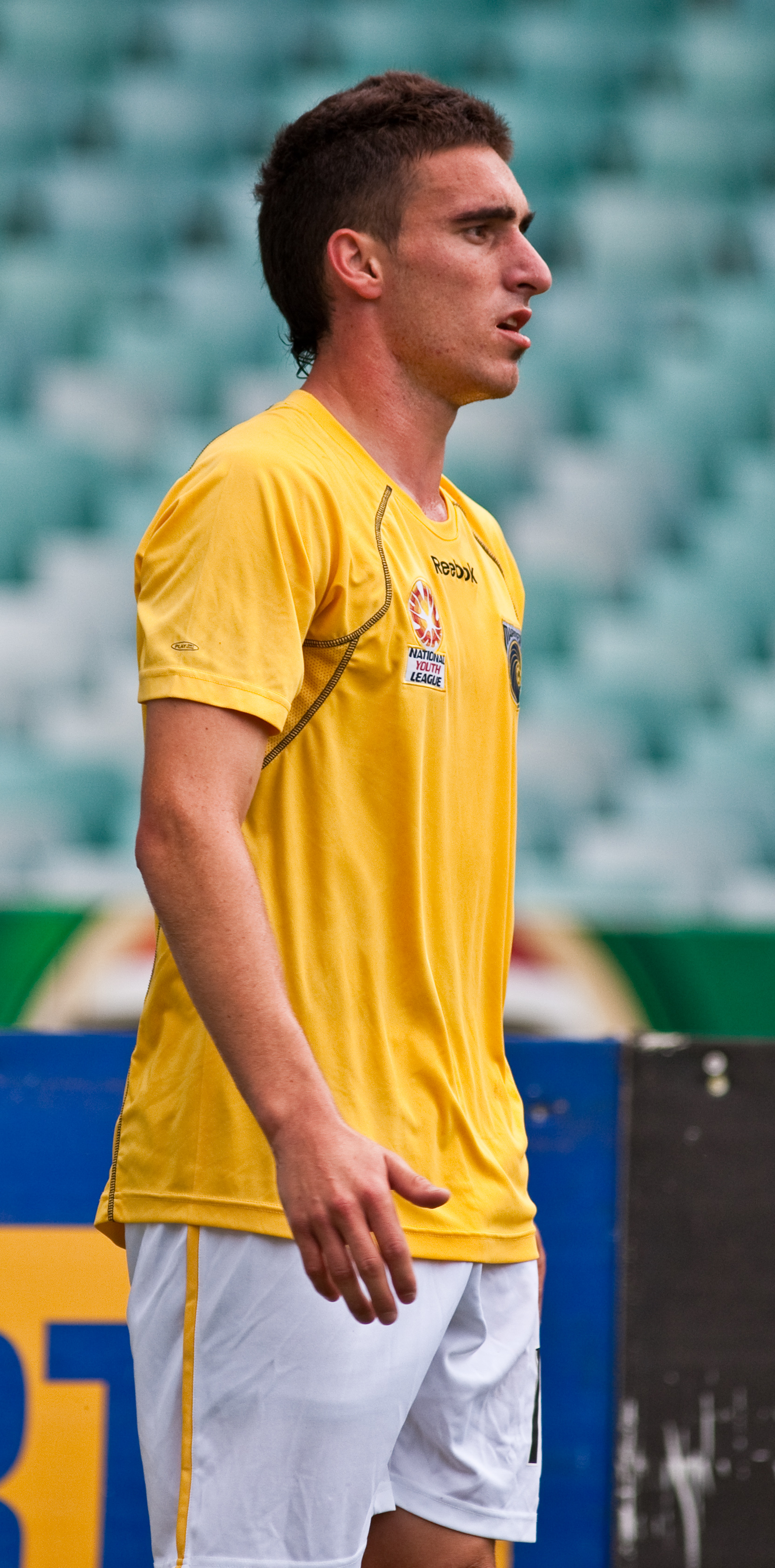

Personal information
- Full name: Panagiotis Nikas
- Date of birth: 27 July 1988 (age 38)
- Place of birth: Kogarah, New South Wales, Australia
- Height: 1.78 m (5 ft 10 in)
- Position: Central midfielder

Youth career
- Sans Souci
- Sydney Olympic
- 2009–2010: Central Coast Mariners

Senior career*
Years	Team	Apps	(Gls)
2008	Penrith Nepean United	13	(3)
2009	Sutherland Sharks	25	(14)
2009–2010	Central Coast Mariners	3	(0)
2010	Sutherland Sharks	9	(4)
2010–2011	North Queensland Fury	18	(1)
2011–2014	Sutherland Sharks	89	(39)
2015–2018	Sydney United 58	83	(45)
2019	Rockdale Ilinden	10	(2)
2020	North Shore Mariners	2	(1)

International career
2013–	Australia (Beach Soccer)		

Managerial career
- 2022: Northbridge Bulls Under 20's Assistant coach
- 2023: Sutherland Sharks
- 2024-2025: Rockdale Ilinden Youth Technical Director
- 2026: Western Sydney Wanderers NPL
- 2026–: Bankstown City
- * Club domestic league appearances and goals

Panagiotis "Panny" Nikas (born 27 July 1988) is an Australian former soccer player. He is most notable for playing for A-League clubs Central Coast Mariners FC and North Queensland Fury FC. He is currently head coach of Bankstown City.

Nikas also represented Australia in beach soccer in 2013.

Nikas is a two time winner of the National Premier Leagues NSW with Sutherland Sharks FC (2009) and Sydney United 58 (2016) and the Waratah Cup (2015, 2016). He was also National Premier Leagues NSW Player of the Season in 2013 and the Central Coast Mariners Youth Player of the Season in 2010.

== Club career ==
=== Penrith Nepean United ===
Whilst at the club during 2008, Nikas played 13 games scoring 3 goals.

=== Sutherland Sharks ===
In 2009, he signed a contract with Sutherland Sharks. Playing 25 games and scoring 14 times. Whilst playing for the Sutherland Sharks, Nikas was selected in the TeleChoice. He also trained in the 2000 2009 NSW Premier League season All-Star team.

=== Central Coast Mariners ===
He signed a contract with Central Coast Mariners in 2009–2010. Most of the year he had been playing in the National Youth League. Nikas made his first team debut for the Central Coast Mariners coming on as a substitute for Nicky Travis in a 2–0 home defeat to the Wellington Phoenix on 31 December 2009. Nikas was named the National Youth League 2009/10 Player of the Season.

On 23 March 2010, despite his impressive performances in their NYL side, Nikas was released by the Mariners.

=== Sutherland Sharks Return ===
In 2010 after being released by Central Coast Mariners he returned to the Sutherland Sharks playing 9 times and scoring 4 goals. He returned to the A-league after his stint with the club.

=== North Queensland Fury ===
In July 2010, Nikas signed with Australian A-League club North Queensland Fury. He made his club debut in a 2–3 loss against Melbourne Heart.

=== Back to Sutherland ===
With the demise of North Queensland Fury, Nikas returned to his state league club Sutherland Sharks for the 2011 NSW Premier League season.

In 2015 Nikas signed with NPL NSW powerhouse Sydney United 58 FC. Nikas scored eight league goals in 19 games as United finished 7th in the league. He also scored a brace in the 2015 FFA Cup Round of 32, as his side beat South Hobart FC on penalties. The following season Nikas scored 18 league goals from midfield as Sydney United 58 took out the premiership.

== Manager career ==
In 2026 Nikas joined the Wanderers youth team as Head Coach.

== A-League career statistics ==
(Correct as of 16 February 2011)

Club	Season	League			Cup			Asia			Total		
Club	Season	Apps	Goals	Assists	Apps	Goals	Assists	Apps	Goals	Assists	Apps	Goals	Assists
Central Coast Mariners	2009–10	3	0	0	-	-	-	-	-	-	3	0	0
North Queensland Fury	2010–11	18	1	0	-	-	-	-	-	-	18	1	0
Total		21	1	0	-	-	-	-	-	-	21	1	0

== Honours ==
Sutherland Sharks:

- NSW Premier League: 2009

Sydney United 58:

- National Premier Leagues: 2016
- Waratah Cup: 2015, 2016

Individual

- A-League National Youth League Player of the Year: 2009–10
- National Premier Leagues NSW Player of the Year: 2013
- National Premier Leagues NSW Golden Boot: 2013
