= Chris Payne (soccer) =

Australian soccer player (born 1990)

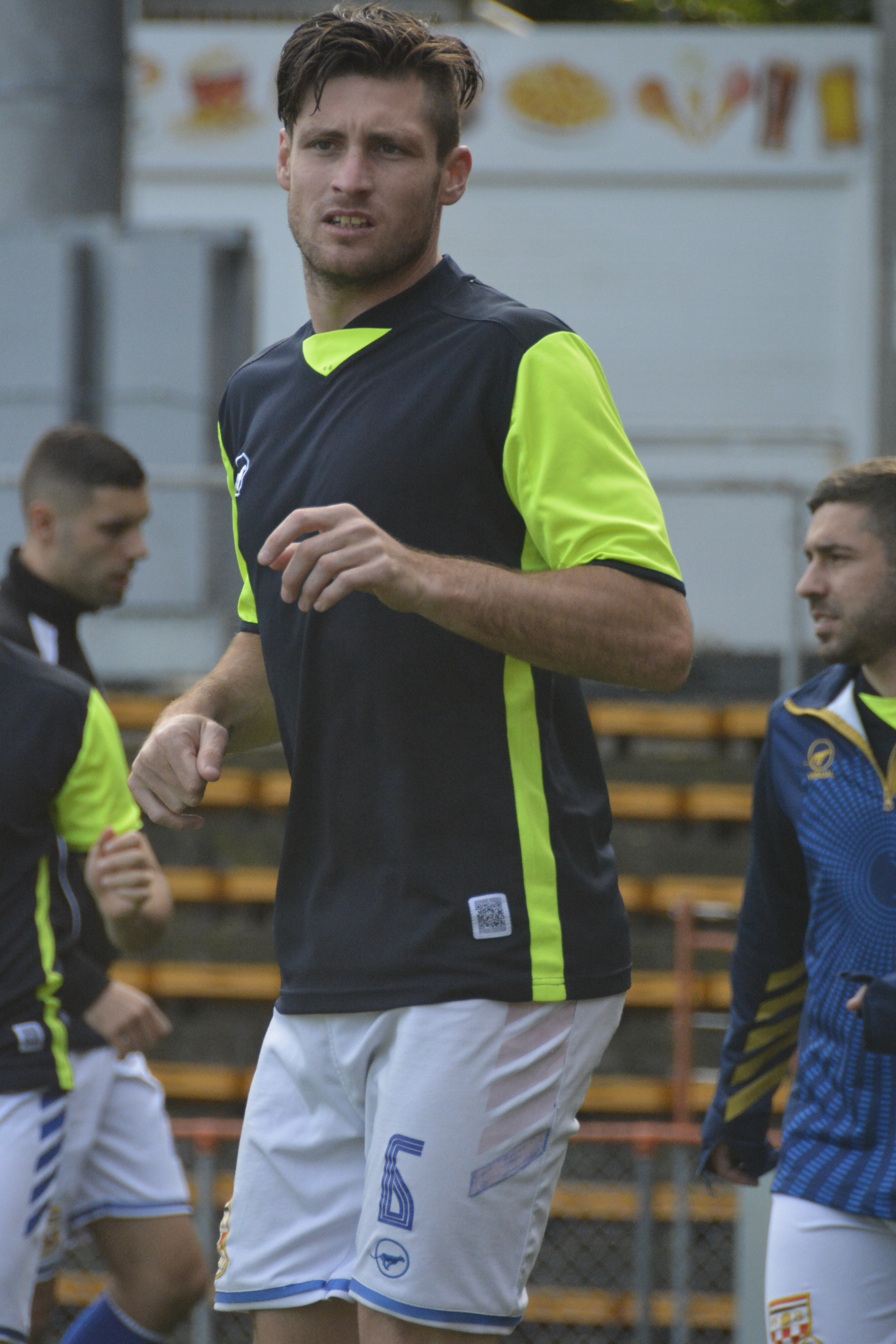
- Payne warming up for Sydney United in 2016

Personal information
- Full name: Christopher Baden Payne
- Date of birth: 15 September 1990 (age 36)
- Place of birth: Gosford, Australia
- Height: 1.79 m (5 ft 10 in)
- Position: Striker

Team information
- Current team: Umina United

Youth career
- Umina United
- Sydney United 58
- 2008–2009: Sydney FC
- 2011–2012: Newcastle Jets

Senior career*
Years	Team	Apps	(Gls)
2008	Manly United	13	(1)
2008–2010	Sydney FC	19	(3)
2010	Manly United	5	(1)
2010–2011	North Queensland Fury	21	(4)
2011–2012	Newcastle Jets	1	(0)
2012–2012	Manly United	0	(0)
2012	Bonnyrigg White Eagles	20	(4)
2013–2014	CCM Academy	21	(8)
2014–2015	Manly United	43	(19)
2016	Sydney United 58	24	(22)
2017	East Bengal	7	(3)
2017–2018	Sydney United 58	33	(16)
2019–2020	APIA Leichhardt	38	(27)
2021–2023	Sydney United 58	63	(26)
2024	Bankstown City Lions	29	(19)
2025–	Umina United	25	(40)

International career^{‡}
2009	Australia U20	13	(1)
2010	Australia U23	3	(0)
- * Club domestic league appearances and goals as of 25 August 2024 ‡ National team caps and goals as of 17:30, 16 November 2010 (UTC)

Christopher Baden Payne (born 15 September 1990) is an Australian professional football player. He currently plays for Umina United in the Central Coast Premier League.

== Club career ==
He finished his HSC at Narrabeen Sports High School.

=== Sydney FC ===
Payne played in all of Sydney's three trial matches and scored a double against his former club Manly United at Cromer Park. His first official competitive outing for Sydney FC came against Queensland Roar in the opening Pre-Season Cup match of the season. Sydney ended up winning the match 2–1 with Payne scoring Sydney's first to level the scores at 1–1 and as a consequence become the club's youngest ever player to score in a fully competitive match. He was officially transferred from Manly a week before the opening round of the 2008/09 season with Manly FC receiving $3000 for the transfer.

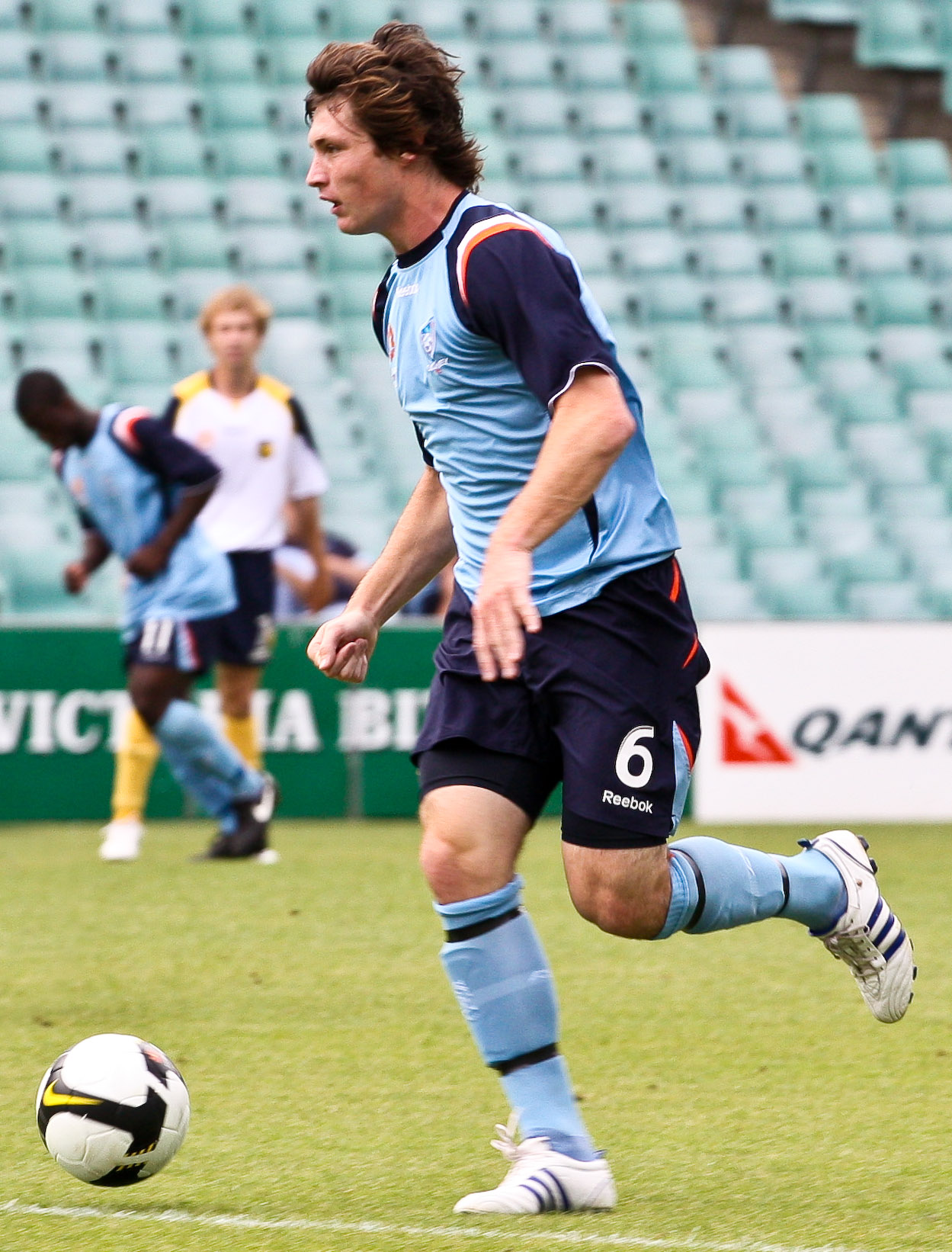
Payne playing for Sydney FC

He scored his first goal for Sydney FC in the 3–1 victory against Newcastle Jets at EnergyAustralia Stadium. While playing against the Wellington Phoenix in the 2009/10 Preliminary final, he scored a controversial goal with his arm. Despite displaying good form during Sydney FC's Finals run, he was not offered a new contract, and went back to his junior club Manly United. On 28 June Payne signed a deal with North Queensland Fury for their following season.

=== North Queensland Fury ===
Payne scored his first goal for the Townsville club in their Round 1, 3–3 draw with Perth Glory. His goal leveled the scores in the first half at 1–1. He again scored against the Glory in the return match in Townsville, hitting a spectacular strike to the top corner of the Glory goal to open the scoring in the Fury's 2–1 win. On 7 December 2010, as a result of the North Queensland Fury folding, it was confirmed Payne signed a two-year contract with the Newcastle Jets.

=== Newcastle Jets ===
Payne made his debut for the Jets, in a pre-season friendly against NSW Premier League club Sutherland Sharks, where he helped the Jets to a 2–1 victory, scoring in the first half. His first A-League appearance for the club came in the 2–1 loss to his former club Sydney FC at Ausgrid Stadium on 17 December 2011.

Despite having a year left on his contract, Payne's future at the Jets looks to be uncertain under new manager Gary van Egmond who has made it clear that Payne is not part of his squad plans, as he believes he is not good enough. It was revealed in January 2012, that the Jets and fellow A-League club Gold Coast United were preparing a 'trade' for Payne with Tahj Minniecon. However this move was thwarted, when Minniecon suffered a heel injury a week before the transfer was to go through, in a Youth League game against Sydney FC. It was announced on 3 February 2012 that Newcastle Jets and Payne had mutually agreed to terminate his contract, more than a year before it expired, due to being unable to secure his position in the squad, as well as it being publicly known that Payne was not part of Van Egmond's squad plans.

=== Bonnyrigg White Eagles ===
Following his unceremonious axing from Newcastle, Payne signed with Bonnyrigg White Eagles for the 2012 New South Wales Premier League season.

=== Central Coast Mariners Academy ===
He scored a goal on his debut for New South Wales Premier League club Central Coast Mariners Academy, in 3–1 loss to Sutherland Sharks on 3 February.

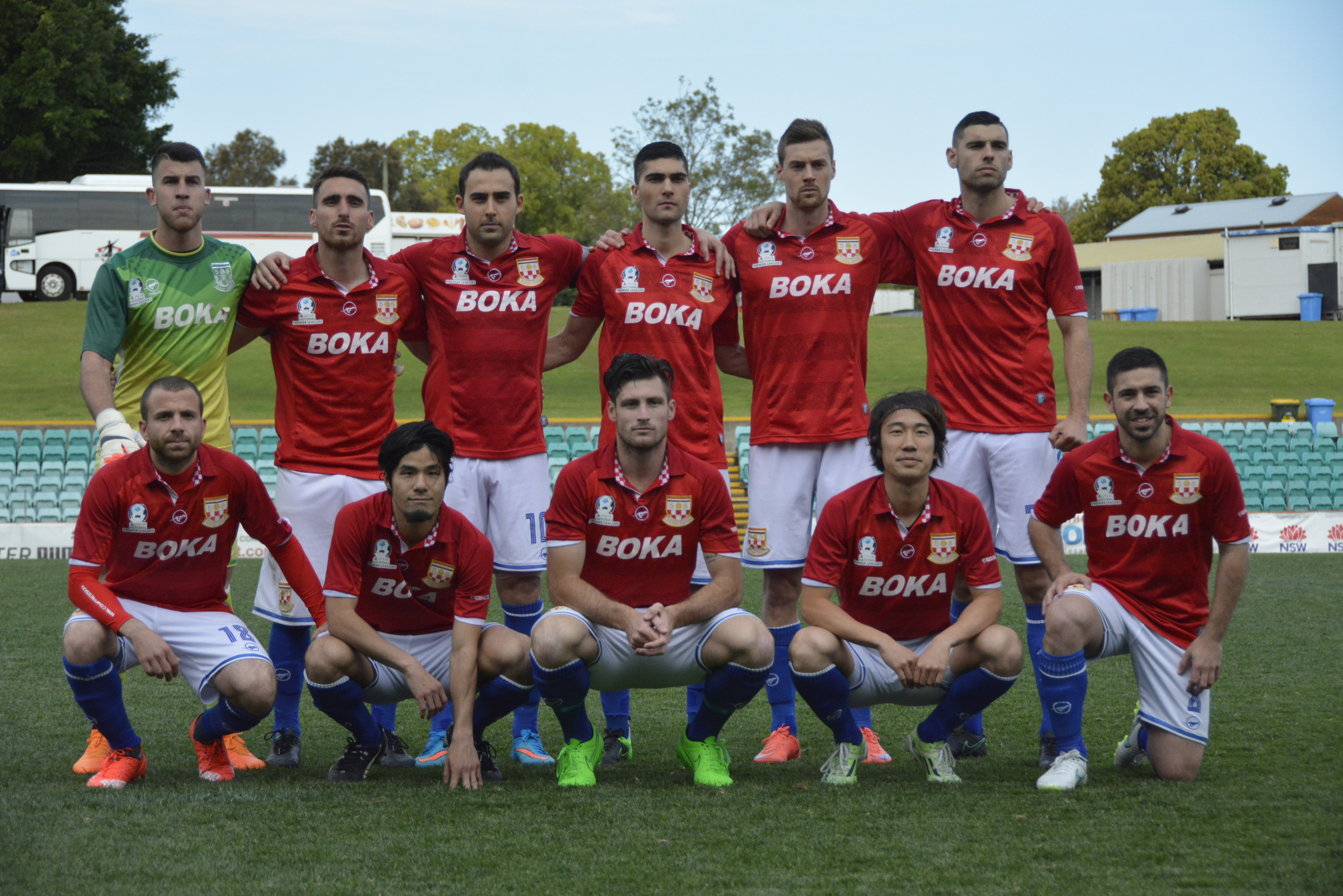
Chris Payne with Sydney United

=== Return to Manly ===
Payne returned to Manly United, signing on for a fourth time. He would play a large part in Manly United's 2014 Waratah Cup run in which they made the Grand Final against fellow NSW NPL 1 club Blacktown City. Payne scored a brace, however this didn't prevent Manly from crashing to a heavy 6–2 defeat at Lambert Park. Manly United also qualified for the inaugural 2014 FFA Cup in which they were drawn against fellow NSW NPL1 side Sydney Olympic at Cromer Park. Manly lost 3–1, despite Payne opening the scoring in the 10th minute.

=== East Bengal ===
On 1 February 2017, Payne moved abroad, and signed for Indian I-League club East Bengal. He came as a replacement for Kyrgyzstani Ildar Amirov, who was released by the club and hence completed their foreigner's quota. On 15 February, he made his debut for the club in a 1–1 draw against Shillong Lajong. He found a shot in the 47th minute of the match which was deflected by the opposition goalkeeper Vishal Kaith. In a match against the same club on 4 March, he scored a brace, scoring in the 9th and the 33rd minute of a 2–1 victory which allowed the club to regain the top spot of the league table. Three days later, he scored in a 2–1 defeat against Churchill Brothers. On 3 May, he was released by the club, ahead of its Federation Cup campaign.

== A-League career statistics ==
(Correct as of 22 February 2015)

Club	Season	League			Cup			Asia			Total		
Club	Season	Apps	Goals	Assists	Apps	Goals	Assists	Apps	Goals	Assists	Apps	Goals	Assists
Sydney FC	2007–08	0	0	0	-	-	-	-	-	-	0	0	0
Sydney FC	2008–09	5	0	0	2	1	0	-	-	-	6	1	0
Sydney FC	2009–10	14	3	0	-	-	-	-	-	-	14	0	3
North Queensland Fury	2010–11	21	4	4	-	-	-	-	-	-	21	4	4
Newcastle Jets	2011–12	1	0	0	-	-	-	-	-	-	1	0	0
Total		41	7	4	2	1	0	-	-	-	43	8	4

== Honours ==
=== Club ===
Sydney FC

- A-League Premiership: 2009–10
- A-League Championship: 2009–10

Bonnyrigg White Eagles

- National Premier Leagues NSW Premiership: 2012

Sydney United 58

- Waratah Cup: 2016, 2023
- National Premier Leagues NSW Premiership: 2016
- National Premier Leagues Championship: 2016

APIA Leichhardt

- National Premier Leagues NSW Championship: 2019

=== Individual ===
- NPL NSW Top Goalscorer: 2016 with Sydney United 58 - 22 goals
- Central Coast Division One Player of the Year: 2025 with Umina United
