= 2016 Football NSW season =

Football New South Wales
- Season: 2016
- Champions: Blacktown City

The Football NSW 2016 season was the fourth season of football in New South Wales under the banner of the National Premier Leagues. The competition consisted of four divisions across the state of New South Wales. The Premiers of the NPL NSW Men's 1 qualified for the national finals, playing-off to decide the champion of the 2016 National Premier Leagues.

== Pre-Season Changes ==
League	Promoted to league	Relegated from league
NPL NSW Men's 1	Hakoah Sydney City East	Marconi Stallions
NPL NSW Men's 2	North Shore Mariners; Sydney FC Youth; Western Sydney Wanderers Youth	Sydney University
NPL NSW Men's 3	Dunbar Rovers	Nepean FC
NSW State League	Bankstown United; St George FA	-

== League Tables ==
=== 2016 National Premier League NSW Men's 1 ===
NPL NSW Men's 1
- Season: 2016
- Champions: Blacktown City
- Premiers: Sydney United 58

The National Premier League New South Wales 2016 season was played over 22 rounds, from March to August 2016.

Pos	Team	Pld	W	D	L	GF	GA	GD	Pts	Qualification or relegation
1	Sydney United 58	22	17	3	2	58	21	+37	54	2016 National Premier Leagues Finals
2	Blacktown City (C)	22	14	3	5	47	26	+21	45	2016 NSW Finals
3	Manly United	22	12	7	3	58	26	+32	43	2016 NSW Finals
4	Rockdale City Suns	22	11	5	6	41	32	+9	38	2016 NSW Finals
5	Bonnyrigg White Eagles	22	9	5	8	43	38	+5	32	2016 NSW Finals
6	Sydney Olympic	22	7	6	9	26	30	−4	27	
7	Sutherland Sharks	22	8	3	11	31	40	−9	27	
8	APIA Leichhardt Tigers	22	7	5	10	39	41	−2	26	
9	Hakoah Sydney City East	22	7	2	13	40	54	−14	23	
10	Parramatta FC	22	7	2	13	28	44	−16	23	
11	Wollongong Wolves	22	5	4	13	23	37	−14	19	
12	Blacktown Spartans (R)	22	4	3	15	22	52	−30	15	Relegation to the 2017 NPL NSW 2 (Note: Promotion and Relegation system based on Club Championship and including points from U20 and U18 teams.)

Source: foxsportspulse.com
Rules for classification: 1) points; 2) goal difference; 3) number of goals scored.
(C) Champions; (R) Relegated

==== Finals ====
Qualifying final
2	Blacktown City	4
3	Manly United	1
4	Rockdale City Suns	2
5	Bonnyrigg White Eagles	4

Major semi-final
1	Sydney United 58	2
2	Blacktown City	3
Minor semi-final
3	Manly United	0
5	Bonnyrigg White Eagles	5

Preliminary final
1	Sydney United 58	3
5	Bonnyrigg White Eagles	2

Grand final
2	Blacktown City	3
1	Sydney United 58	0

=== 2016 National Premier League NSW Men's 2 ===
NPL NSW Men's 2
- Season: 2016
- Champions: Sydney FC Youth
- Promoted: Sydney FC Youth

The 2016 National Premier League NSW Men's 2 was the fourth edition of the NPL NSW 2 as the second level domestic association football competition in New South Wales. 14 teams competed, playing each other twice for a total of 26 rounds, with the top team at the end of the year promoted to the NPL NSW Men's 1 competition. The league began on March 6 with the regular season concluding on August 28. The top 6 teams competed in the finals series.

Pos	Team	Pld	W	D	L	GF	GA	GD	Pts	Qualification or relegation
1	Sydney FC Youth (C, P)	26	16	3	7	84	41	+43	51	Promotion to the 2017 NPL NSW 1 (Note: Promotion and Relegation system based on Club Championship and including points from U20 and U18 teams.)
2	Western Sydney Wanderers Youth	26	13	9	4	75	42	+33	48	Qualification for the 2016 NPL NSW Men's 2 Finals
3	Bankstown City	26	14	3	9	53	41	+12	45	Qualification for the 2016 NPL NSW Men's 2 Finals
4	Marconi Stallions	26	13	5	8	65	53	+12	44	Qualification for the 2016 NPL NSW Men's 2 Finals
5	Mounties Wanderers	26	11	6	9	49	50	−1	39	Qualification for the 2016 NPL NSW Men's 2 Finals
6	Mt Druitt Town Rangers	26	12	3	11	42	49	−7	39	Qualification for the 2016 NPL NSW Men's 2 Finals
7	Northern Tigers	26	10	4	12	41	44	−3	34	
8	Macarthur Rams	26	10	4	12	44	48	−4	34	
9	St George	26	10	4	12	41	53	−12	34	
10	Central Coast Mariners Academy	26	10	3	13	52	62	−10	33	
11	Fraser Park (R)	26	9	3	14	43	52	−9	30	Relegation to the 2017 NPL NSW 3
12	Spirit FC	26	8	6	12	30	46	−16	30	
13	Bankstown Berries	26	8	5	13	47	58	−11	29	
14	North Shore Mariners	26	5	8	13	27	42	−15	23	

Source: https://websites.sportstg.com/comp_info.cgi?c=1-10179-0-399130-0&a=LADDER
(C) Champions; (P) Promoted; (R) Relegated

==== Finals ====
Elimination finals
4	Marconi Stallions	3
5	Mounties Wanderers	4
3	Bankstown City	1
6	Mt Druitt Town Rangers	3

Semi-finals
1	Sydney FC Youth	3
6	Mt Druitt Town Rangers	0
2	Western Sydney Wanderers Youth	2
5	Mounties Wanderers	1

Grand final
1	Sydney FC Youth	4
2	Western Sydney Wanderers Youth	1

=== 2016 National Premier League NSW Men's 3 ===
NPL NSW Men's 3
- Season: 2016
- Champions: Hills United

The 2016 National Premier League NSW Men's 3 was the fourth edition of the newly renamed NPL NSW Men's 3 to be incorporated under the National Premier Leagues banner. 12 teams competed, playing each other twice for a total of 22 rounds.

Pos	Team	Pld	W	D	L	GF	GA	GD	Pts	Qualification or relegation
1	Hills United (C, P)	22	18	2	2	89	36	+53	56	Promotion to the 2017 NPL NSW 2 (Note: Promotion system based on Club Championship and including points from U20 and U18 teams.)
2	Rydalmere Lions	22	15	3	4	68	32	+36	48	Qualification for the 2016 NPL NSW Men's 3 Finals
3	Dunbar Rovers	22	15	3	4	62	31	+31	48	Qualification for the 2016 NPL NSW Men's 3 Finals
4	Stanmore Hawks	22	15	3	4	47	29	+18	48	Qualification for the 2016 NPL NSW Men's 3 Finals
5	Sydney University	22	11	4	7	42	35	+7	37	Qualification for the 2016 NPL NSW Men's 3 Finals
6	Gladesville Ryde Magic	22	10	2	10	43	50	−7	32	
7	Hawkesbury City	22	7	4	11	28	32	−4	25	
8	Inter Lions	22	8	1	13	46	53	−7	25	
9	Balmain Tigers	22	6	2	14	31	65	−34	20	
10	Dulwich Hill	22	5	3	14	44	64	−20	18	
11	Granville Rage	22	5	2	15	44	65	−21	17	
12	Western NSW Mariners	22	2	1	19	30	82	−52	7	

(C) Champions; (P) Promoted

=== 2016 NSW State League ===
NSW State League
- Season: 2016
- Champions: St George FA
- Promoted: St George FA; SD Raiders

The 2016 NSW State League was the fourth edition of the newly renamed State League to be incorporated under the National Premier Leagues banner. 12 teams competed, playing each other twice for a total of 22 matches.

Pos	Team	Pld	W	D	L	GF	GA	GD	Pts	Qualification or relegation
1	St George FA (C, P)	22	17	2	3	76	15	+61	53	Promotion to the 2017 NPL NSW 3 (Note: Promotion and Relegation system based on Club Championship and including points from U20 and U18 teams.)
2	Hurstville FC	22	16	3	3	46	20	+26	51	Qualification for the 2016 NSW State League Finals
3	SD Raiders (P)	22	15	3	4	82	28	+54	48	Promotion to the 2017 NPL NSW 3
4	Bankstown United	22	11	5	6	44	35	+9	38	Qualification for the 2016 NSW State League Finals
5	Camden Tigers	22	11	5	6	50	44	+6	38	Qualification for the 2016 NSW State League Finals
6	Nepean FC	22	8	4	10	35	48	−13	28	
7	Western Condors	22	7	6	9	27	38	−11	27	
8	Hurstville City Minotaurs	22	7	4	11	34	49	−15	25	
9	Prospect United	22	6	3	13	46	47	−1	21	
10	Wagga City Wanderers	22	7	0	15	44	78	−34	21	
11	University of NSW	22	4	2	16	35	66	−31	14	
12	FC Gazy Auburn	22	3	3	16	26	74	−48	12	

(C) Champions; (P) Promoted

==== Finals ====
Qualifying final
2	Hurstville FC	2
3	SD Raiders	0
4	Bankstown United	2
5	Camden Tigers	4

Major semi-final
1	St George FA	2 (8)
2	Hurstville FC	2 (7)
Minor semi-final
3	SD Raiders	4
5	Camden Tigers	2

Preliminary final
1	St George FA	1 (6)
3	SD Raiders	1 (5)

Grand final
1	St George FA	2 (5)
2	Hurstville FC	2 (4)

=== 2016 National Premier Leagues NSW Women's 1 ===
National Premier Leagues NSW Women's 1
- Season: 2016
- Champions: Sydney University
- Premiers: Sydney University

The 2016 National Premier League NSW Women's 1 was the third edition of the NPL NSW Women's competition to be incorporated under the National Premier Leagues banner. 10 teams competed, playing each other twice for a total of 18 rounds.

Pos	Team	Pld	W	D	L	GF	GA	GD	Pts	Qualification or relegation
1	Sydney University (C)	18	12	3	3	46	16	+30	39	Qualification for the 2016 NPL NSW Women's Finals
2	North West Sydney Koalas	18	12	2	4	43	25	+18	38	Qualification for the 2016 NPL NSW Women's Finals
3	Manly United	18	9	4	5	29	22	+7	31	Qualification for the 2016 NPL NSW Women's Finals
4	Macarthur Rams	18	9	3	6	38	21	+17	30	Qualification for the 2016 NPL NSW Women's Finals
5	Illawarra Stingrays	18	9	3	6	41	36	+5	30	
6	Marconi Stallions (R)	18	8	3	7	25	30	−5	27	Relegation to 2017 NPL NSW Women's 2 competition
7	North Shore Mariners	18	6	6	6	35	31	+4	24	
8	Blacktown Spartans	18	5	3	10	29	43	−14	18	
9	Emerging Jets	18	4	0	14	24	62	−38	12	
10	Football NSW Institute	18	1	3	14	29	53	−24	6	

Source: sportstg.com
Rules for classification: 1) points; 2) goal difference; 3) number of goals scored.
(C) Champions; (R) Relegated

==== Finals ====
Semi-finals
1	Sydney University	3
2	North West Sydney Koalas	2
3	Manly United	1
4	Macarthur Rams	0

Preliminary final
North West Sydney Koalas	3
Manly United	1

Grand final
Sydney University	2
North West Sydney Koalas	1

== 2016 Waratah Cup ==
Football NSW soccer clubs competed in 2016 for the Waratah Cup. The tournament doubled as the NSW qualifier for the 2016 FFA Cup, with the top five clubs progressing to the Round of 32, as well as the reigning National Premier Leagues champion (Blacktown City FC). 130 clubs entered the qualifying phase, with the clubs entering in a staggered format.

The competition was won by defending champions Sydney United 58, their 6th title, defeating Manly United.

In addition to the three A-League clubs (Central Coast Mariners, Sydney FC and Western Sydney Wanderers), the six qualifiers (Blacktown City, Bonnyrigg White Eagles, Manly United, Marconi Stallions, Sydney United 58 and Wollongong Wolves) competed in the final rounds of the 2016 FFA Cup. Of these qualifying clubs, Blacktown City progressed to the quarter-finals stage.

== Awards ==
The end of year awards were presented on 9 September 2016 at Rosehill Gardens

=== National Premier Leagues NSW ===
Award	Men's	Women's
Player of the Year	Adam Parkhouse (Manly United)	Remy Siemsen (Manly United) & Tara Andrews (NWS Koalas)
Golden Boot	Chris Payne (Sydney United – 22 goals)	Tara Andrews (NWS Koalas – 26 goals)
Coach of the Year	Paul Dee (Manly United)	Ashley Wilson (Emerging Jets)
Goalkeeper of the Year	Paul Henderson (Sydney Olympic)	Jada Whyman (FNSW Institute)
Goal of the Year	Richard Cardozo (Manly United)	—
Referee of the Year	Kris Griffith-Jones	Kelly Jones
U-20's Golden Boot	Duncan Stewart (APIA Leichhardt – 21 goals)	Samantha Nagy (Blacktown Spartans – 8 goals)
U-20's Player of the Year	Duncan Stewart (APIA Leichhardt)	Ariane Demetriou (Sydney University)

=== National Premier Leagues NSW 2 ===
Award	Men's	Women's
Player of the Year	Matthew West (Mounties Wanderers)	Kirilee Cook (Inter Lions)
Golden Boot	Charles Lokolingoy (Sydney FC – 25 goals)	Sarah Mandile (Inter Lions – 13 goals)
Coach of the Year	Robert Stanton (Sydney FC)	Michael McGovern (Sutherland Shire)
Goalkeeper of the Year	Dion Shaw (Bankstown City)	Amanda Seskin (Sydney Olympic)
U-20's Golden Boot	Emmanuel Gonzalez (Sydney FC – 27 goals)	Ciara O'Sullivan (Northern Tigers – 10 goals)
U-20's Player of the Year	Yasser Al-Taay (Marconi Stallions)	Hannah McNutty (Northern Tigers)

=== National Premier Leagues NSW 3 ===
Award	Men's
Player of the Year	Peter Cejka (Hills Brumbies)
Golden Boot	Peter Cejka (Hills Brumbies – 32 goals)
Coach of the Year	Tony Panteli (Stanmore Hawks)
Goalkeeper of the Year	James Webb (Stanmore Hawks)
U-20's Golden Boot	Nikolas Dimitriadis (Hills Brumbies – 14 goals) & Mortaza Safdari (Rydalmere Lions – 14 goals)
U-20's Player of the Year	Yasser Al-Taay (Marconi Stallions)

=== Other awards ===
Media Award	Chris Boulos – Fairfield Champion
Charles Valentine Award	Dane Sim – Blacktown Spartans
