= 2016 Waratah Cup =

Tournament details
- Country: Australia (NSW)
- Teams: 6

Final positions
- Champions: Sydney United 58
- Runners-up: Manly United

Tournament statistics
- Matches played: 5
- Top goal scorer: Chris Payne (3 goals)

The 2016 Waratah Cup was the 14th season of Football NSW's knockout competition. The Preliminary Rounds are now a part of the 2016 FFA Cup competition. The 5 winners from the FFA Cup preliminary Seventh Round qualify for the Waratah Cup, as well as the reigning National Premier Leagues champion (Blacktown City FC).

The Cup was won by the defending champions Sydney United 58, their 6th title.

== Preliminary rounds ==
New South Wales clubs, other than Northern NSW and A-League clubs, participate in the FFA Cup via the preliminary rounds. The competition is for all Senior Men's teams of the National Premier Leagues NSW, NPL 2, NPL 3, NSW State League, as well as Association teams which applied to participate.

A total of 130 clubs entered into the competition, and the five qualifiers to join Blacktown City FC in the final rounds are:

Qualifiers
Bonnyrigg White Eagles (2)	Manly United (2)	Marconi Stallions (3)	Sydney United 58 (2)	Wollongong Wolves (2)

== Playoff round ==
Four of the qualifiers played off to reduce the remaining teams to 4, with Manly United and Sydney United 58 receiving a Bye until the semi-finals.

8 June 2016
19:30

Blacktown City FC	2–1	Bonnyrigg White Eagles
Major 54'; Mallia 77'	Report	Zonjić 86'

Lily Homes Stadium, Seven Hills, Sydney

8 June 2016

Marconi Stallions	2–1	Wollongong Wolves
Perre 52'; Ješić 90+3' (pen.)	Report	Bernal 61'

Sydney United Sports Centre, Sydney

== Semi finals ==
A total of 4 teams took part in this stage of the competition.

22 June 2016
19:30

Manly United	2–1 (a.e.t.)	Blacktown City FC
Cooper 3'; Bragg 119' (pen.)	Report	Grozdanovski 38'

Cromer Park, Sydney

22 June 2016

Sydney United 58	5–1	Marconi Stallions
Payne 6', 36', 42'; Uskok 24'; Nikas 38'	Report	Perre 64'

Sydney United Sports Centre, Sydney
Referee: Michael Weiner

== Grand final ==
10 July 2016

Manly United	0–1	Sydney United 58
	Source	Shin 47'

Lambert Park, Sydney
