= 2016 National Premier Leagues =

National Premier Leagues
- Season: 2016
- Champions: Sydney United 58 (2nd Title)
- Finalists: Adelaide City; Bentleigh Greens; Brisbane Strikers; Canberra Olympic; Devonport City; Edgeworth FC; Perth SC; Sydney United 58

The 2016 National Premier Leagues was the fourth season of the Australian National Premier Leagues soccer competition. The league competition was played amongst eight separate divisions, divided by FFA state and territory member federations. The divisions are ACT, NSW, Northern NSW, Queensland, South Australia, Tasmania, Victoria and Western Australia.

The winners of each respective divisional league competed in a finals playoff tournament at season end, with Sydney United 58 crowned as Champions, which gave them direct qualification for the 2017 FFA Cup Round of 32.

== League tables ==
=== ACT ===
Pos	Team	Pld	W	D	L	GF	GA	GD	Pts	Qualification or relegation
1	Canberra Olympic (C)	18	15	0	3	50	16	+34	45	2016 National Premier Leagues Finals
2	Tigers FC	18	13	3	2	61	28	+33	42	2016 ACT Finals
3	Belconnen United	18	11	2	5	49	24	+25	35	2016 ACT Finals
4	Canberra	18	10	2	6	44	31	+13	32	2016 ACT Finals
5	Gungahlin United	18	6	4	8	20	29	−9	22	
6	FFA Centre of Excellence	18	7	1	10	51	48	+3	22	
7	Tuggeranong United	18	6	3	9	26	35	−9	21	
8	Canberra United Academy (R)	18	6	0	12	44	68	−24	18	Disbanded at end of season
9	Monaro Panthers	18	4	2	12	22	49	−27	14	
10	Woden Weston	18	3	1	14	16	55	−39	10	

Source: sportstg.com
Rules for classification: 1) points; 2) goal difference; 3) number of goals scored.
(C) Champions; (R) Relegated

==== Finals ====
Semi-finals
1	Canberra Olympic	2 (5)
2	Tigers FC	2 (3)
3	Belconnen United	0
4	Canberra FC	4

Preliminary Final
2	Tigers FC	1
4	Canberra FC	5

Grand Final
1	Canberra Olympic	3
4	Canberra FC	0

=== NSW ===
Pos	Team	Pld	W	D	L	GF	GA	GD	Pts	Qualification or relegation
1	Sydney United 58	22	17	3	2	58	21	+37	54	2016 National Premier Leagues Finals
2	Blacktown City (C)	22	14	3	5	47	26	+21	45	2016 NSW Finals
3	Manly United	22	12	7	3	58	26	+32	43	2016 NSW Finals
4	Rockdale City Suns	22	11	5	6	41	32	+9	38	2016 NSW Finals
5	Bonnyrigg White Eagles	22	9	5	8	43	38	+5	32	2016 NSW Finals
6	Sydney Olympic	22	7	6	9	26	30	−4	27	
7	Sutherland Sharks	22	8	3	11	31	40	−9	27	
8	APIA Leichhardt Tigers	22	7	5	10	39	41	−2	26	
9	Hakoah Sydney City East	22	7	2	13	40	54	−14	23	
10	Parramatta FC	22	7	2	13	28	44	−16	23	
11	Wollongong Wolves	22	5	4	13	23	37	−14	19	
12	Blacktown Spartans (R)	22	4	3	15	22	52	−30	15	Relegation to the 2017 NPL NSW 2 (Note: Promotion and Relegation system based on Club Championship and including points from U20 and U18 teams.)

Source: foxsportspulse.com
Rules for classification: 1) points; 2) goal difference; 3) number of goals scored.
(C) Champions; (R) Relegated

==== Finals ====
Qualifying final
2	Blacktown City	4
3	Manly United	1
4	Rockdale City Suns	2
5	Bonnyrigg White Eagles	4

Major semi-final
1	Sydney United 58	2
2	Blacktown City	3
Minor semi-final
3	Manly United	0
5	Bonnyrigg White Eagles	5

Preliminary final
1	Sydney United 58	3
5	Bonnyrigg White Eagles	2

Grand final
2	Blacktown City	3
1	Sydney United 58	0

=== Northern NSW ===
Pos	Team	Pld	W	D	L	GF	GA	GD	Pts	Qualification or relegation
1	Edgeworth FC (C)	18	15	1	2	52	19	+33	46	2016 National Premier Leagues Finals
2	Hamilton Olympic	18	12	6	0	49	13	+36	42	2016 Northern NSW Finals
3	Broadmeadow Magic	18	9	5	4	49	28	+21	32	2016 Northern NSW Finals
4	Maitland	18	8	5	5	34	23	+11	29	2016 Northern NSW Finals
5	Newcastle Jets Youth	18	7	3	8	38	46	−8	24	
6	Charlestown City Blues	18	7	3	8	29	41	−12	24	
7	Lambton Jaffas	18	5	4	9	27	35	−8	19	
8	Valentine FC	18	5	4	9	27	43	−16	19	
9	Adamstown Rosebud	18	3	2	13	21	53	−32	11	
10	Weston Workers	18	1	3	14	18	43	−25	6	

Source: foxsportspulse.com
Rules for classification: 1) points; 2) goal difference; 3) number of goals scored.
(C) Champions

==== Finals ====
Semi-finals
1	Edgeworth Eagles	2	2	4
4	Maitland	2	1	3
2	Hamilton Olympic	1	1	2
3	Broadmeadow Magic	3	2	5

Grand Final
1	Edgeworth Eagles	2
3	Broadmeadow Magic	1

=== Queensland ===
Pos	Team	Pld	W	D	L	GF	GA	GD	Pts	Qualification or relegation
1	Brisbane Strikers	22	14	5	3	51	19	+32	47	2016 National Premier Leagues Finals
2	Gold Coast City	22	12	7	3	58	29	+29	43	2016 Queensland Finals
3	Far North Queensland	22	13	3	6	42	27	+15	42	2016 Queensland Finals
4	Redlands United (C)	22	12	1	9	41	36	+5	37	2016 Queensland Finals
5	Brisbane City	22	9	8	5	35	28	+7	35	
6	Olympic FC	22	11	1	10	45	46	−1	34	
7	Moreton Bay United	22	7	8	7	36	32	+4	29	
8	South West Queensland Thunder	22	8	2	12	38	57	−19	26	
9	Brisbane Roar Youth	22	7	4	11	30	38	−8	25	
10	Western Pride	22	6	6	10	38	43	−5	24	
11	Sunshine Coast	22	7	3	12	32	45	−13	24	
12	Northern Fury	22	0	4	18	22	73	−51	4	

Source: foxsportspulse.com
Rules for classification: 1) points; 2) goal difference; 3) number of goals scored.
(C) Champions

==== Finals ====
Semi-finals
1	Brisbane Strikers	1 (2)
4	Redlands United	1 (4)
2	Gold Coast City	0
3	Far North Queensland	1

Grand Final
3	Far North Queensland	2
4	Redlands United	3

=== South Australia ===
Pos	Team	Pld	W	D	L	GF	GA	GD	Pts	Qualification or relegation
1	Adelaide City	22	17	2	3	62	27	+35	53	2016 National Premier Leagues Finals
2	Campbelltown City (C)	22	15	4	3	45	19	+26	49	2016 South Australia Finals
3	West Torrens Birkalla	22	12	4	6	42	24	+18	40	2016 South Australia Finals
4	Adelaide Blue Eagles	22	11	4	7	51	34	+17	37	2016 South Australia Finals
5	Adelaide Comets	22	11	3	8	41	39	+2	36	2016 South Australia Finals
6	North Eastern MetroStars	22	11	2	9	39	34	+5	35	2016 South Australia Finals
7	West Adelaide	22	8	6	8	34	33	+1	30	
8	Croydon Kings	22	7	3	12	34	42	−8	24	
9	Adelaide United Youth (Note: Adelaide United Youth cannot qualify for the National Premier Leagues finals series.)	22	7	1	14	25	43	−18	22	
10	Adelaide Olympic	22	6	4	12	38	60	−22	22	
11	South Adelaide (R)	22	6	1	15	31	52	−21	19	Relegation to the 2017 SA State League 1
12	Adelaide Raiders (R)	22	4	0	18	25	60	−35	12	Relegation to the 2017 SA State League 1

Source: foxsportspulse.com
Rules for classification: 1) points; 2) goal difference; 3) number of goals scored.
(C) Champions; (R) Relegated

==== Finals ====
Elimination finals
3	West Torrens Birkalla	1
6	North Eastern MetroStars	0
4	Adelaide Blue Eagles	3
5	Adelaide Comets	2

Semifinals
1	Campbelltown City	0
2	Adelaide City	2
West Torrens Birkalla	2
Adelaide Blue Eagles	1

Preliminary final
Campbelltown City	4
West Torrens Birkalla	0

Grand final
Adelaide City	0
Campbelltown City	1

=== Tasmania ===
Pos	Team	Pld	W	D	L	GF	GA	GD	Pts	Qualification or relegation
1	Devonport City (C)	21	19	1	1	61	10	+51	58	2016 National Premier Leagues Finals
2	Hobart Zebras	21	16	2	3	62	27	+35	50	2016 League Cup
3	South Hobart	21	15	3	3	87	21	+66	48	2016 League Cup
4	Olympia	21	9	0	12	51	47	+4	27	2016 League Cup
5	Launceston City	21	7	2	12	24	58	−34	23	2016 League Cup
6	Kingborough Lions United	21	6	3	12	34	53	−19	21	2016 League Cup
7	Clarence United	21	3	2	16	23	71	−48	11	
8	Northern Rangers	21	1	3	17	20	75	−55	6	

Source: foxsportspulse.com
Rules for classification: 1) points; 2) goal difference; 3) number of goals scored.
(C) Champions

==== Finals ====
The end of season finals series for the League Cup was held using the same format as the previous year, which included the top six teams from the NPL Tasmania as well as the premiers from the Northern Championship (Somerset) and Southern Championship (Glenorchy Knights). The quarter-final and semi-final matches were decided by random draw. The competition was formerly known as the Victory Cup, but was renamed due to lapsing sponsorship arrangements.

Quarter-finals
Devonport City	4
Olympia	0
Hobart Zebras	4
Somerset	0
South Hobart	3
Glenorchy Knights	2
Kingborough Lions United	2
Launceston City	1

Semi-finals
Devonport City	4
Hobart Zebras	1
South Hobart	2
Kingborough Lions United	0

Grand final
Devonport City	2
South Hobart	6

=== Victoria ===
Pos	Team	Pld	W	D	L	GF	GA	GD	Pts	Qualification or relegation
1	Bentleigh Greens	26	18	5	3	61	22	+39	59	2016 National Premier Leagues Finals
2	Heidelberg United	26	17	5	4	59	26	+33	53 (Note: Heidelberg United had three points deducted for misconduct in the 2015 season.)	2016 Victoria Finals
3	South Melbourne (C)	26	18	2	6	64	39	+25	53 (Note: South Melbourne had three points deducted for misconduct in the 2016 season.)	2016 Victoria Finals
4	Oakleigh Cannons	26	14	5	7	48	36	+12	47	2016 Victoria Finals
5	Green Gully	26	13	5	8	42	30	+12	44	2016 Victoria Finals
6	Hume City	26	13	4	9	47	25	+22	43	2016 Victoria Finals
7	Pascoe Vale	26	11	4	11	38	36	+2	37	
8	Avondale FC	26	10	5	11	37	42	−5	35	
9	Melbourne Knights	26	9	4	13	30	51	−21	31	
10	Port Melbourne	26	7	5	14	26	38	−12	26	
11	Bulleen Lions	26	5	10	11	21	32	−11	25	
12	Richmond (R)	26	5	8	13	37	58	−21	23	2016 relegation play-offs
13	Northcote City (R)	26	5	5	16	27	58	−31	20	Relegation to the 2017 NPL Victoria 2
14	Melbourne Victory Youth (R)	26	3	1	22	24	68	−44	4 (Note: Melbourne Victory Youth had six points deducted for misconduct in the 2016 season.)	Relegation to the 2017 NPL Victoria 2

Source: foxsportspulse.com
Rules for classification: 1) points; 2) goal difference; 3) number of goals scored.
(C) Champions; (R) Relegated

==== Finals ====
Elimination Finals
4	Oakleigh Cannons	5
5	Green Gully	2
3	South Melbourne	3
6	Hume City	0

Semi-finals
1	Bentleigh Greens	1
4	Oakleigh Cannons	3
2	Heidelberg United	1
3	South Melbourne	2

Final
3	South Melbourne	3
4	Oakleigh Cannons	2

=== Western Australia ===
Pos	Team	Pld	W	D	L	GF	GA	GD	Pts	Qualification or relegation
1	Perth SC (C)	22	13	4	5	39	23	+16	43	2016 National Premier Leagues Finals
2	Inglewood United	22	13	3	6	44	32	+12	42	2016 Western Australia Finals
3	ECU Joondalup	22	13	2	7	38	29	+9	41	2016 Western Australia Finals
4	Floreat Athena	22	11	5	6	50	32	+18	38	2016 Western Australia Finals
5	Bayswater City	22	12	2	8	43	31	+12	38	
6	Sorrento	22	11	5	6	30	28	+2	38	
7	Stirling Lions	22	11	1	10	51	32	+19	34	
8	Balcatta	22	8	1	13	37	50	−13	25	
9	Cockburn City	22	5	7	10	37	47	−10	22	
10	Perth Glory Youth	22	6	3	13	23	40	−17	21	
11	Armadale	22	6	1	15	26	41	−15	19	
12	Subiaco AFC	22	5	2	15	20	53	−33	17	

Source: foxsportspulse.com
Rules for classification: 1) points; 2) goal difference; 3) number of goals scored.
(C) Champions

==== Finals ====
Semi-finals
1	Perth	1 (5)
2	Inglewood United	1 (4)
3	ECU Joondalup	5
4	Floreat Athena	4

Preliminary Final
2	Inglewood United	3 (6)
3	ECU Joondalup	3 (5)

Grand Final
1	Perth	1
2	Inglewood United	0

== Final Series ==
The winner of each league competition (top of the table) in the NPL competed in a single match knockout tournament to decide the National Premier Leagues Champion for 2016. Unlike previous years, the participants were not matched up based on geographical proximity, instead an open draw was used to determine the match ups and hosting of quarter finals. Hosting of the semi-finals and final was based on a formula relating to time of winning (normal time, extra time or penalties), goals scored and allowed, and yellow/red cards. The winner also qualified for the 2017 FFA Cup Round of 32.

Club	Qualified From	Participation
Canberra Olympic	(Australian Capital Territory) ACT	1st
Sydney United 58	(New South Wales) NSW	2nd
Edgeworth FC	(New South Wales) Northern NSW	2nd
Brisbane Strikers	Queensland	1st
Adelaide City	South Australia	1st
Devonport City	Tasmania	1st
Bentleigh Greens	(Victoria (state)) Victoria	1st
Perth	Western Australia	1st

Quarter-finals
(New South Wales) Sydney United 58	5
(South Australia) Adelaide City	4
(Queensland) Brisbane Strikers	3
(Australian Capital Territory) Canberra Olympic	2
(Western Australia) Perth	6
(Tasmania) Devonport City	1
(Victoria (state)) Bentleigh Greens	1
(New South Wales) Edgeworth FC (a.e.t.)	3

Semi-finals
(New South Wales) Sydney United 58	2
(Queensland) Brisbane Strikers	1
(Western Australia) Perth	0
(New South Wales) Edgeworth FC	1

Grand Final
(New South Wales) Sydney United 58	4
(New South Wales) Edgeworth FC	1

=== Quarter-finals ===
17 September 2016
15:00 AEST

Bentleigh Greens (Victoria (state))	1–3 (a.e.t.)	(New South Wales) Edgeworth FC
Maclean 89'	Report	Moore 54'; Gardner 99', 109'

Kingston Heath Soccer Complex, Melbourne
Referee: Chris Hope

17 September 2016
18:00 AEST

Brisbane Strikers (Queensland)	3–2	(Australian Capital Territory) Canberra Olympic
Marsh 6'; Bobolas 67' (o.g.); Habtemarium 81' (o.g.)	Report	Tsekenis 13', 26'

Perry Park, Brisbane
Referee: Alex King

17 September 2016
18:00 AWST

Perth (Western Australia)	6–1	(Tasmania) Devonport City
Diaz 11'; Milenkovic 21', 30'; Catarcione 55'; Keltie 85'; Theodosiades 90+3'	Report	Mann 70'

Litis Stadium, Perth
Referee: David Bruce

18 September 2016
14:00 AEST

Sydney United 58 (New South Wales)	5–4	(South Australia) Adelaide City
Shin 23'; Nikas 35', 57', 77'; Payne 90+2'	Report	Allwright 45', 60'; Halliday 68'; Costa 89'

Sydney United Sports Centre, Sydney
Referee: Ben Abraham

=== Semi-finals ===
24 September 2016
18:00 AWST

Perth (Western Australia)	0–1	(New South Wales) Edgeworth FC
	Report	McBreen 51'

Dorrien Gardens, Perth
Referee: Adam Fielding

25 September 2016
14:30 AEST

Sydney United 58 (New South Wales)	2–1	(Queensland) Brisbane Strikers
Nikas 51', 71'	Report	Clulow 35'

Sydney United Sports Centre, Sydney
Referee: Adam Susz

=== Grand Final ===
2 October 2016
14:30

Sydney United 58 (New South Wales)	4–1	(New South Wales) Edgeworth FC
Nikas 17'; Trifiro 29', 78', 88'	Report	Moriyasu 58'

Sydney United Sports Centre, Sydney
Referee: Alex King

== Individual honours ==
Glen Trifiro from Sydney United 58 won the John Kosmina Medal for the best player in the NPL Grand Final.
