= Richard Cardozo =

Australian football player

Richie Cardozo
Personal information
- Full name: Richard Carlos Cardozo
- Date of birth: 28 March 1986 (age 40)
- Place of birth: Sydney, Australia
- Height: 1.83 m (6 ft 0 in)
- Positions: Attacking midfielder; striker

Youth career
- NSWIS

Senior career*
Years	Team	Apps	(Gls)
2003	Sydney Olympic	2	(0)
2004–2005	Parramatta Eagles	26	(11)
2005–2006	Waitakere United	16	(7)
2006	Green Gully Cavaliers	16	(2)
2007–2008	FC Bex	28	(7)
2008–2009	Richmond	42	(17)
2010–2011	Hume City	54	(37)
2012	LASK	8	(2)
2013	Rockdale City Suns	33	(28)
2013–2014	Waitakere United	15	(11)
2014	Hume City	19	(7)
2015	Sydney United	11	(6)
2015–2016	Naxxar Lions	13	(2)
2016	Alashkert FC	0	(0)
2016	Manly United	14	(9)
2017	Khon Kaen	16	(11)
2019	Marconi Stallions	10	(1)
2020–2021	Manly United	29	(3)
2022–	Mt Druitt Town Rangers	2	(0)

International career^{‡}
2002–2003	Australia U-17	19	(15)
- * Club domestic league appearances and goals as of 13 September 2022 ‡ National team caps and goals as of 5 February 2012

Richard "Richie" Cardozo (born 28 March 1986 in Australia) is an Australian football (soccer) player who plays in the position of attacking midfielder or striker. He currently plays for Mt Druitt Town Rangers.

== Early life ==
Cardozo was born in Sydney, Australia. He was born to his Uruguayan father and his Argentinian mother. He grew up speaking Spanish at home, and is also fluent in French and English. Cardozo has one older brother, former Socceroo Pablo Cardozo.

== Playing career ==
Cardozo was selected for every representative team growing up; including New South Wales School Boys, New South Wales Under 14's, New South Wales Under 15's, and New South Wales Under 16's. He was also selected into the New South Wales Institute of Sport as a scholarship holder, and made the Under 16's and Under 17's Australian Team where he captained two games, won Top Goal Scorer for the World Cup Qualifiers, and represented Australia in the FIFA U-17 World Cup.

=== 2003 and the NSL ===
Richie made his NSL debut at 17 years old in 2003 for Sydney Olympic in the final season of the NSL before it became the A-League. At such a young age, Richie was earmarked by coaches and scouts to be the next big thing in Australian Football. However, with the collapse of the NSL, and the establishment of the new A-League, Cardozo's career was stalled, and he missed out on both a contract in the A-League, and the Under 20's World Cup in the Netherlands in 2005.

=== 2007 ===
After spells in the New South Wales Premier League, the Victorian Premier League, and the New Zealand National League, Cardozo signed a contract with Swiss third division team FC Bex in February 2007. After a stint that covered both the 06–07, and 07–08 seasons, he returned to Melbourne to play in the Victorian Premier League.

=== 2008 – 2011 ===
For the 2008 and 2009 season, Cardozo played for Richmond. He then moved to Hume City for the 2010 and 2011 season. Over the four years that he played in the Victorian Premier League, Carodozo scored 54 goals. In the 2011 Victorian Premier League season he was crowned top scorer in the league with 19 goals and won Media Player of the Year.

=== 2012 ===
In January 2012, he signed with Austrian Football First League club LASK. on a 2 1/2-year deal. LASK Linz never lost a game with Cardozo playing that season, and a push for promotion to the Austrian Bundesliga fell slightly short. Unfortunately at the end of that season off field indiscretions by the club resulted in LASK being relegated to the 3rd tier of Austrian Football by the Austrian Federation, and Cardozo and LASK mutually terminated the remaining 2 years of his contract.

=== 2013 ===
In 2013, Cardozo returned to his home town of Sydney for the inaugural revamped National Premier League and played a major role in leading Rockdale City Suns to a Grand Final Birth. It was yet again a successful season for Cardozo, being selected in the starting 11 for the team of the year, and also netting 17 season goals to win the very first Golden boot for the NSW NPL and in doing so becoming the first and only player to win the Golden boot in both the NSW and Victorian Premier Leagues.

=== 2013/2014 ===
In the Southern Summer, he returned to New Zealand and his former club in Waitakere United. Cardozo finished the season as the league's second top goalscorer.

=== 2014 ===
Hume City. Cardozo yet again linked up with a former team in Hume City for the 2014 season. It was a below par season for Cardozo by his standards, as he took over the captaincy of the side due to a long-term injury to the team's first choice skipper. Playing a different role and position within the team for most of the season, Cardozo found it more difficult to make his customary impact, scoring less goals than previous years. Frustration grew, rumours of a major contractual dispute and mis-management by the club surfaced for the third successive stint with Hume City. A tag that has haunted the organisation on many occasions for many years, and along with a desire to return to play professionally overseas again, ultimately led to the apparent reason for Cardozo's departure.

=== 2016 ===
In 2016, Cardozo joined Manly United in the NSW Premier League. Playing his first game of the season with Manly he scored a goal against Mounties Wanderers to advance Manly to the next round in the FFA cup. Cardozo ended his campaign with 10 goals in all competitions. Despite only playing half the season Cardozo finished as one of the league's leading goalscorers and helping Manly United to a Waratah cup final, FFA cup round of 32 and play off berth.

=== International career ===
Cardozo has represented Australia at U/17 level, and went to the FIFA U/17 World Championships in Finland 2003. He was the Top Goal Scorer in the Qualifying campaign and Captained the side on two occasions. He narrowly missed out on selection for both the Australian U/20 team to compete in the 2005 World Youth Championships, and also the Olyroos that went to the Beijing Olympics 2008.
