= 2014 Waratah Cup =

Tournament details
- Country: Australia (NSW)
- Teams: 100

Final positions
- Champions: Blacktown City (4th title)
- Runners-up: Manly United

Tournament statistics
- Matches played: 99
- Goals scored: 433 (4.37 per match)

The 2014 Waratah Cup was the 12th season of Football NSW's knockout competition in the state of New South Wales, Australia, which ran from 15 March to 6 July. Clubs entered from the top four divisions of the State League (including the recently established National Premier Leagues NSW), as well as teams from various other amateur Associations.

The winners were Blacktown City, their 4th title (including the Statewide Cup competition).

The competition also served as qualifying rounds for the 2014 FFA Cup. The four semi-finalists qualified for the final rounds of the 2014 FFA Cup, entering at the round of 32. The four losing quarter-finalists then competed in a separate playoff event to determine the remaining three qualifiers.

== First round ==
A total of 64 teams took part in this stage of the competition, comprising 9 teams from the State League Division 2, and 55 teams from other amateur Associations that successfully applied. All matches in this round were completed by 16 March 2014.

Tie no	Home team (tier)	Score	Away team (tier)
1	Rooty Hill RSL (-)	1–9	Southern Bulls (5)
2	Glebe Wanderers (-)	8–1	Bass Hill RSL (-)
3	Padstow United Sports (-)	5–2	Southern Branch (5)
4	Oatley RSL (-)	1–2	Marayong (-)
5	The Ponds (-)	0–7	Lokomotiv Cove (-)
6	Ararat (-)	2–1	East Gosford (-)
7	Revesby Workers (-)	0–1†	Loftus Yarrawarrah Rovers (-)
8	Mosman (-)	4–4†	Cringila Lions (-)
Mosman advance 4–3 on penalties.
9	Chullora Wolves (-)	0–1	Glenmore Park (-)
10	Emu Plains (aa2) (-)	3–5	Doonside Hawks (-)
11	Western Condors (5)	4–1	Balmain Wanderers (-)
12	Sans Souci (-)	2–1	Yagoona Lions (-)
13	Dapto Dandaloo Fury (-)	3–0	St Marys Band Club (-)
14	Glebe Gorillas (-)	0–12	Wollongong United (-)
15	Enfield Rovers (5)	2–2†	Hurstville City Minotaurs (5)
Enfield Rovers advance 5–4 on penalties.
16	Bringelly (-)	1–5	Auburn (-)

Tie no	Home team (tier)	Score	Away team (tier)
17	UNSW (5)	0–3	Dunbar Rovers (-)
18	Hills Pumas (-)	4–1	The Entrance Bateau Bay (-)
19	Parramatta City (-)	4–0	Pagewood Botany (-)
20	Inter Lions (Canterbury District) (-)	w/o	Granville Kewpies Ariana (-)
Walkover for Inter Lions – Granville Kewpies Ariana removed.
21	Pendle Hill (-)	1–2	Bonnet Bay (-)
22	Manly Vale (-)	11–0	Bankstown RSL Dragons (-)
23	Rydalmere (GDSFA) (-)	1–2	Gladesville Ravens (-)
24	Dobroyd (-)	0–6	Hurstville ZFC (5)
25	Prospect United (5)	3–1	Knox United (-)
26	Waverley Old Boys (-)	2–0	Revesby Rovers (B) (-)
27	Quakers Hill Junior (-)	3–7†	Kogarah Waratahs (-)
28	Arncliffe Aurora (-)	2–1	Berkley Vale (-)
29	Villawood United (-)	0–8	Coogee United (-)
30	Rydalmere Lions (5)	5–1	Kincumber Roos (-)
31	Panania RSL (-)	1–3	St Clair United (-)
32	West Ryde Rovers (-)	1–3	Revesby Rovers (A) (-)

== Second round ==
A total of 32 teams took part in this stage of the competition. All matches in this round were completed by 23 March 2014.

Tie no	Home team (tier)	Score	Away team (tier)
1	Manly Vale (-)	0–4	Dapto Dandaloo Fury (-)
2	Arncliffe Aurora (-)	3–2	Coogee United (-)
3	Glebe Wanderers (-)	0–2	Hurstville ZFC (5)
4	St Clair United SC (-)	2–7	Auburn (-)
5	Southern Bulls (5)	w/o	Inter Lions (Canterbury District) (-)
Walkover for Southern Bulls – Inter Lions removed.
6	Loftus Yarrawarrah Rovers (-)	1–3	Western Condors (5)
7	Bonnet Bay (-)	0–6	Wollongong United (-)
8	Dunbar Rovers (-)	5–1	Parramatta City (-)

Tie no	Home team (tier)	Score	Away team (tier)
9	Mosman (-)	1–2	Prospect United (5)
10	Kogarah Waratahs (-)	5–1	Marayong (-)
11	Doonside Hawks (-)	2–0	Enfield Rovers (5)
12	Ararat (-)	0–6	Waverley Old Boys (-)
13	Rydalmere Lions (5)	5–1	Gladesville Ravens (-)
14	Revesby Rovers (A) (-)	0–1	Sans Souci (-)
15	Lokomotiv Cove (-)	1–0	Padstow United Sports (-)
16	Hills Pumas (-)	9–1	Glenmore Park (-)

== Third round ==
A total of 40 teams took part in this stage of the competition. 12 clubs from the NPL Division 2 and 12 Clubs from the State League Division 1 entered into the competition at this stage. All matches in this round were completed by 9 April 2014.

Tie no	Home team (tier)	Score	Away team (tier)
1	Dunbar Rovers (-)	0–2	Hakoah Sydney City East (4)
2	Kogarah Waratahs (-)	0–4	Macarthur Rams (3)
3	Wollongong United (-)	2–4†	Dulwich Hill (4)
4	Bankstown City (3)	4–1	Gladesville Ryde Magic (4)
5	Mt Druitt Town Rangers (3)	1–3†	Mounties Wanderers (3)
6	Spirit FC (3)	4–0	Rydalmere Lions (5)
7	Lokomotiv Cove (-)	0–1	San Souci (-)
8	Auburn (-)	1–3	Dapto Dandaloo Fury (-)
9	Central Coast Mariners Academy (3)	3–1	Prospect United (5)
10	Fraser Park (3)	3–1	Inter Lions (4)

Tie no	Home team (tier)	Score	Away team (tier)
11	Waverley Old Boys (-)	3–1	Western Condors (5)
12	Balmain Tigers (4)	2–3	Granville Rage (4)
13	Bankstown Berries (3)	3–0	Stanmore Hawks (4)
14	Western NSW Mariners (4)	0–3	Northern Tigers (3)
15	Hurstville ZFC (5)	3–1	Southern Bulls (5)
16	Parramatta (3)	1–0	Hills Brumbies (3)
17	Northbridge (4)	3–4	Doonside Hawks (-)
18	Arncliffe Aurora (-)	1–2	Sydney University (3)
19	Hills Pumas (-)	0–0†	Camden Tigers (4)
Hills Pumas advance 4–3 on penalties.
20	Nepean (4)	2–5	Hawkesbury City (4)

== Fourth round ==
A total of 32 teams took part in this stage of the competition. 12 clubs from the National Premier Leagues NSW entered into the competition at this stage. All matches in this round were completed by 23 April 2014.

Tie no	Home team (tier)	Score	Away team (tier)
1	Sydney United 58 (2)	4–0	Spirit FC (3)
2	Central Coast Mariners Academy (3)	1–1†	Sydney Olympic (2)
Sydney Olympic advance 3–2 on penalties.
3	Bankstown Berries (3)	0–1†	St George (2)
4	Dulwich Hill (4)	0–2	Parramatta (3)
5	South Coast Wolves (2)	6–0	Hurstville ZFC (5)
6	Sutherland Sharks (2)	3–1	Hawkesbury City (4)
7	Marconi Stallions (2)	2–1†	Dapto Dandaloo Fury (-)
8	APIA Leichhardt Tigers (2)	0–2	Manly United (2)

Tie no	Home team (tier)	Score	Away team (tier)
9	Macarthur Rams (3)	3–1	Doonside Hawks (-)
10	Hills Pumas (-)	0–1	Sans Souci (-)
11	Blacktown Spartans (2)	1–4	Northern Tigers (3)
12	Blacktown City (2)	5–0	Bankstown City (3)
13	Hakoah Sydney City East (4)	2–1	Sydney University (3)
14	Granville Rage (4)	3–2	Mounties Wanderers (3)
15	Rockdale City Suns (2)	1–2	Bonnyrigg White Eagles (2)
16	Waverley Old Boys (-)	1–4	Fraser Park (3)

== Fifth round ==
A total of 16 teams took part in this stage of the competition. All matches in this round were completed by 8 May 2014.

Tie no	Home team (tier)	Score	Away team (tier)
1	Bonnyrigg White Eagles (2)	1–2†	Manly United (2)
2	Blacktown City (2)	2–0	Marconi Stallions (2)
3	Parramatta FC (3)	3–0	Macarthur Rams (3)
4	Sans Souci (-)	0–3	Northern Tigers (3)

Tie no	Home team (tier)	Score	Away team (tier)
5	South Coast Wolves (2)	1–1†	Sutherland Sharks (2)
South Coast Wolves advance 4–3 on penalties.
6	Fraser Park (3)	1–8	Sydney United 58 (2)
7	Sydney Olympic (2)	6–0	St George (2)
8	Hakoah Sydney City East (4)	3–1	Granville Rage (4)

== Quarter-finals ==
A total of 8 teams took part in this stage of the competition. The four victorious teams in this round qualified for the 2014 FFA Cup round of 32. Matches in this round were played on 21 May 2014.

Tie no	Home team (tier)	Score	Away team (tier)
1	Sydney Olympic (2)	4–2	Sydney United 58 (2)
2	Hakoah Sydney City East (4)	1–2	Blacktown City (2)
3	Manly United (2)	1–1†	Northern Tigers (3)
Manly United advance 5–4 on penalties.
4	Parramatta FC (3)	2–5†	South Coast Wolves (2)

== Playoff rounds ==
Separate from the main fixtures of the Waratah Cup, three of the four losers of the quarter-final fixtures also took part in further matches as part of the 2014 FFA Cup qualifiers.

Sydney United 58, Hakoah Sydney City East, and Parramatta FC all qualified for the 2014 FFA Cup round of 32.

== Semi-finals ==
A total of 4 teams took part in this stage of the competition. Matches in this round were played on 11 June 2014.

Tie no	Home team (tier)	Score	Away team (tier)
1	Sydney Olympic (2)	1–2	Blacktown City (2)
2	South Coast Wolves (2)	1–4	Manly United (2)

== Final ==
The 2014 Waratah Cup Final was held at the neutral venue of Lambert Park on 6 July 2014.

6 July 2014

Manly United	2–6	Blacktown City
Payne 7', 75'	Report	Miyazawa 4', 79'; Major 40'; Baccus 64'; Mallia 68'; Choi 87'

Lambert Park
Referee: Chris Young
