= 2014 FFA Cup preliminary rounds =

Qualification rounds for 2014 season of Australian soccer competition

Tournament details
- Country: Australia
- Teams: 631

The 2014 FFA Cup preliminary rounds were a series of state-based knockout competitions, providing a qualification pathway for the 2014 FFA Cup (now known as the Australia Cup), the Australian soccer knockout cup competition.

The majority of clubs entered the tournament through their respective state federations, in which they competed in a state-based cup tournament to progress to the overall Round of 32 of the competition. A total of 22 teams will qualify from these qualifying competitions, joining the 10 A-League clubs in the Round of 32.

== ACT ==
ACT clubs qualified for the FFA Cup via the 2013 Federation Cup. From 2015 onwards the winner of that same years' Federation Cup would become the ACT's qualifier for the FFA Cup Round of 32. Scheduling meant the 2014 winner would not be decided until after the qualifier needed to be named. To overcome this Capital Football announced that the 2014 winner of the ACTs pre-season competition was to be the ACT's qualifier in 2014. However, Tuggeranong United – as the 2013 Federation Cup winners – successfully appealed to Capital Football to qualify them as ACT's 2014 FFA Cup entrant.

=== Schedule ===
Federation	Round	Main date	Number of fixtures	Clubs	New entries this round
ACT	Round 1	6 April 2013	10 + 6 byes	34 → 24	26
ACT	Round 2	13 April 2013	8	24 → 16	none
ACT	Round 3	2–23 May 2013	8	16 → 8	8
ACT	Quarter-finals	20 June–3 July 2013	4	8 → 4	none
ACT	Semi-finals	25 July–1 August 2013	2	4 → 2	none
ACT	Final	28 August 2013	1	2 → 1	none

=== First round ===
22 Clubs from various divisions of the ACT State Leagues, as well as 4 Masters teams, entered into the 2013 Federation Cup competition at this stage. Matches in this round were played on 6 April 2013.

Tie no	Home team (Tier)	Score	Away team (Tier)
1	ANU FC Masters (-)	6–0	Queanbeyan City Masters 3 (-)
2	Queanbeyan City (5)	0–3	White Eagles (3)
3	Gungahlin United (6)	1–8	Queanbeyan City (3)
4	Tuggeranong United (3)	0–4	O'Connor Knights (3)
5	Senior NTC (3)	2–4	ANU FC (SL1) (3)

Tie no	Home team (Tier)	Score	Away team (Tier)
6	Tuggeranong United (5)	6–1	Palerang United (10)
7	Weston Molonglo Masters 1 (-)	1–2	Narrabundah (3)
8	Canberra (SL1) (3)	4–2	Weston Creek (4)
9	Weston Molonglo (SL4) (6)	0–1	Burns (6)
10	Weston Molonglo (SL6) (8)	4–1	Crossroads (11)

Notes

- Byes – UC Pumas (3), Weston Creek (3), ANU FC (SL2) (4), Narrabundah (8), Gungahlin Juventus (5), and Gungahlin United Masters 2 (-).

=== Second round ===
Matches in this round were played on 13 April 2013.

Tie no	Home team (Tier)	Score	Away team (Tier)
1	Narrabundah (8)	4–3	ANU FC Masters (-)
2	White Eagles (3)	1–1†	ANU FC (SL2) (4)
White Eagles advance 6–5 on penalties.
3	Queanbeyan City (3)	6–0	Gungahlin Juventus (5)
4	O'Connor Knights (3)	1–0	ANU FC (SL1) (3)

Tie no	Home team (Tier)	Score	Away team (Tier)
5	UC Pumas (3)	2–0	Tuggeranong United (5)
6	Weston Creek (3)	7–0	Gungahlin United Masters 2 (-)
7	Canberra (SL1) (3)	2–1	Narrabundah (3)
8	Burns (6)	5–1	Weston Molonglo (SL6) (8)

Notes

- † = After Extra Time

=== Third round ===
8 Clubs from the ACT National Premier League (Tier 2) entered into the competition at this stage. Matches in this round were played on 2–23 May 2013.

Tie no	Home team (Tier)	Score	Away team (Tier)
1	Tuggeranong United (2)	6–0	Narrabundah (8)
2	Canberra Olympic (2)	2–2†	White Eagles (3)
Canberra Olympic advance 5–4 on penalties.
3	Woden Valley (2)	2–1	Queanbeyan City (3)
4	O'Connor Knights (3)	1–0	UC Pumas (3)

Tie no	Home team (Tier)	Score	Away team (Tier)
5	Cooma (2)	5–0	Monaro Panthers (2)
6	Belconnen United (2)	5–0	Weston Creek (3)
7	Canberra (NPL) (2)	6–0	Canberra City (2)
8	Canberra (SL1) (3)	2–1	Burns (6)

Notes

- † = After Extra Time

=== Quarter-finals ===
All matches in this round were completed by 20 June–3 July 2013.

Tie no	Home team (Tier)	Score	Away team (Tier)
1	Belconnen United (2)	2–3	Cooma (2)
2	Canberra Olympic (2)	1–3	Tuggeranong United (2)
3	O'Connor Knights (3)	0–6	Woden Valley (2)
4	Canberra (SL1) (3)	0–8	Canberra (NPL) (2)

=== Semi-finals ===
Matches in this round were played on 25 July–1 August 2013.

Tie no	Home team (Tier)	Score	Away team (Tier)
1	Cooma (2)	3–2	Canberra (NPL) (2)
2	Tuggeranong United (2)	0–0†	Woden Valley (2)
Tuggeranong United advance 3–2 on penalties.

Notes

- † = After Extra Time

=== Final ===
A total of 2 teams took part in this stage of the competition. The victorious team in this round qualified for the 2014 FFA Cup Round of 32. Matches in this round were played on 28 August 2013.

Tie no	Home team (Tier)	Score	Away team (Tier)
1	Tuggeranong United (2)	3–2†	Cooma (2)

Notes

- † = After Extra Time

== NSW ==
New South Wales clubs, other than Northern NSW and A-League clubs, qualify for the FFA Cup via the 2014 Waratah Cup. There are seven allocated places from the Waratah Cup that qualify for the 2014 FFA Cup Round of 32; the four quarterfinal winners, and a separate competition for the four quarterfinal losers to determine the final three places.

The competition is for all teams of the National Premier Leagues NSW, NPL Division 2, State League Division 1, State League Division 2, as well as 55 Association teams which applied to participate in the 2014 competition.

=== Schedule ===
Federation	Round	Main date	Number of fixtures	Clubs	New entries this round
NSW	Round 1	15–16 March 2014	32	100 → 68	64
NSW	Round 2	22–23 March 2014	16	68 → 52	none
NSW	Round 3	9 April 2014	20	52 → 32	24
NSW	Round 4	23 April 2014	16	32 → 16	12
NSW	Round 5	7 May 2014	8	16 → 8	none
NSW	Quarter-finals	21 May 2014	4	8 → 8	none
NSW	First Playoff Round	4 June 2014	2	8 → 8	none
NSW	Second Playoff Round	17 June 2014	1	8 → 7	none

=== First round ===
A total of 64 teams took part in this stage of the competition, comprising 9 teams from the State League Division 2, and 55 teams from other amateur Associations that successfully applied. All matches in this round were completed by 16 March 2014.

Tie no	Home team (Tier)	Score	Away team (Tier)
1	Rooty Hill RSL (6)	1–9	Southern Bulls (5)
2	Glebe Wanderers (6)	8–1	Bass Hill RSL (6)
3	Padstow United Sports (6)	5–2	Southern Branch (5)
4	Oatley RSL (6)	1–2	Marayong (6)
5	The Ponds (6)	0–7	Lokomotiv Cove (6)
6	Ararat (7)	2–1	East Gosford (6)
7	Revesby Workers (6)	0–1†	Loftus Yarrawarrah Rovers (8)
8	Mosman (6)	4–4†	Cringila Lions (6)
Mosman advance 4–3 on penalties.
9	Chullora Wolves (7)	0–1	Glenmore Park (7)
10	Emu Plains (7)	3–5	Doonside Hawks (6)
11	Western Condors (5)	4–1	Balmain Wanderers (6)
12	Sans Souci (6)	2–1	Yagoona Lions (6)
13	Dapto Dandaloo Fury (6)	3–0	St Marys Band Club (6)
14	Glebe Gorillas (6)	0–12	Wollongong United (6)
15	Enfield Rovers (5)	2–2†	Hurstville City Minotaurs (5)
Enfield Rovers advance 5–4 on penalties.
16	Bringelly (9)	1–5	Auburn (6)

Tie no	Home team (Tier)	Score	Away team (Tier)
17	University of NSW (5)	0–3	Dunbar Rovers (6)
18	Hills Pumas (6)	4–1	The Entrance Bateau Bay (6)
19	Parramatta City (6)	4–0	Pagewood Botany (6)
20	Inter Lions (CDSFA) (14)	w/o	Granville Kewpies Ariana (11)
21	Pendle Hill (11)	1–2	Bonnet Bay (6)
22	Manly Vale (6)	11–0	Bankstown RSL Dragons (8)
23	Rydalmere (GDSFA) (6)	1–2	Gladesville Ravens (6)
24	Dobroyd (6)	0–6	Hurstville ZFC (5)
25	Prospect United (5)	3–1	Knox United (6)
26	Waverley Old Boys (6)	2–0	Revesby Rovers (B) (9)
27	Quakers Hill Junior (6)	3–7†	Kogarah Waratahs (6)
28	Arncliffe Aurora (6)	2–1	Berkeley Vale (6)
29	Villawood United (7)	0–8	Coogee United (6)
30	Rydalmere Lions (5)	5–1	Kincumber Roos (7)
31	Panania RSL (6)	1–3	St Clair United (6)
32	West Ryde Rovers (6)	1–3	Revesby Rovers (A) (7)

Notes

- w/o = Walkover
- † = After Extra Time

=== Second round ===
A total of 32 teams took part in this stage of the competition. All matches in this round were completed by 23 March 2014.

Tie no	Home team (Tier)	Score	Away team (Tier)
1	Manly Vale (6)	0–4	Dapto Dandaloo Fury (6)
2	Arncliffe Aurora (6)	3–2	Coogee United (6)
3	Glebe Wanderers (6)	0–2	Hurstville ZFC (5)
4	St Clair United (6)	2–7	Auburn (6)
5	Southern Bulls (5)	w/o	Inter Lions (CDSFA) (14)
6	Loftus Yarrawarrah Rovers (8)	1–3	Western Condors (5)
7	Bonnet Bay (6)	0–6	Wollongong United (6)
8	Dunbar Rovers (6)	5–1	Parramatta City (6)

Tie no	Home team (Tier)	Score	Away team (Tier)
9	Mosman (6)	1–2	Prospect United (5)
10	Kogarah Waratahs (6)	5–1	Marayong (6)
11	Doonside Hawks (6)	2–0	Enfield Rovers (5)
12	Ararat (7)	0–6	Waverley Old Boys (6)
13	Rydalmere Lions (5)	5–1	Gladesville Ravens (6)
14	Revesby Rovers (A) (7)	0–1	Sans Souci (6)
15	Lokomotiv Cove (6)	1–0	Padstow United Sports (6)
16	Hills Pumas (6)	9–1	Glenmore Park (7)

Notes

- w/o = Walkover

=== Third round ===
A total of 40 teams took part in this stage of the competition. 12 clubs from the NPL Division 2 and 12 clubs from the State League Division 1 entered into the competition at this stage. All matches in this round were completed by 9 April 2014.

Tie no	Home team (Tier)	Score	Away team (Tier)
1	Dunbar Rovers (6)	0–2	Hakoah Sydney City East (4)
2	Kogarah Waratahs (6)	0–4	Macarthur Rams (3)
3	Wollongong United (6)	2–4†	Dulwich Hill (4)
4	Bankstown City (3)	4–1	Gladesville Ryde Magic (4)
5	Mt Druitt Town Rangers (3)	1–3†	Mounties Wanderers (3)
6	Spirit FC (3)	4–0	Rydalmere Lions (5)
7	Lokomotiv Cove (6)	0–1	San Souci (6)
8	Auburn (6)	1–3	Dapto Dandaloo Fury (6)
9	Central Coast Mariners Academy (3)	3–1	Prospect United (5)
10	Fraser Park (3)	3–1	Inter Lions (4)

Tie no	Home team (Tier)	Score	Away team (Tier)
11	Waverley Old Boys (6)	3–1	Western Condors (5)
12	Balmain Tigers (4)	2–3	Granville Rage (4)
13	Bankstown Berries (3)	3–0	Stanmore Hawks (4)
14	Western NSW Mariners (4)	0–3	Northern Tigers (3)
15	Hurstville ZFC (5)	3–1	Southern Bulls (5)
16	Parramatta (3)	1–0	Hills Brumbies (3)
17	Northbridge (4)	3–4	Doonside Hawks (6)
18	Arncliffe Aurora (6)	1–2	Sydney University (3)
19	Hills Pumas (6)	0–0†	Camden Tigers (4)
Hills Pumas advance 4–3 on penalties.
20	Nepean (4)	2–5	Hawkesbury City (4)

Notes

- † = After Extra Time

=== Fourth round ===
A total of 32 teams took part in this stage of the competition. 12 clubs from the National Premier Leagues NSW entered into the competition at this stage. All matches in this round were completed by 23 April 2014.

Tie no	Home team (Tier)	Score	Away team (Tier)
1	Sydney United 58 (2)	4–0	Spirit FC (3)
2	Central Coast Mariners Academy (3)	1–1†	Sydney Olympic (2)
Sydney Olympic advance 3–2 on penalties.
3	Bankstown Berries (3)	0–1†	St George (2)
4	Dulwich Hill (4)	0–2	Parramatta (3)
5	South Coast Wolves (2)	6–0	Hurstville ZFC (5)
6	Sutherland Sharks (2)	3–1	Hawkesbury City (4)
7	Marconi Stallions (2)	2–1†	Dapto Dandaloo Fury (6)
8	APIA Leichhardt Tigers (2)	0–2	Manly United (2)

Tie no	Home team (Tier)	Score	Away team (Tier)
9	Macarthur Rams (3)	3–1	Doonside Hawks (6)
10	Hills Pumas (6)	0–1	Sans Souci (6)
11	Blacktown Spartans (2)	1–4	Northern Tigers (3)
12	Blacktown City (2)	5–0	Bankstown City (3)
13	Hakoah Sydney City East (4)	2–1	Sydney University (3)
14	Granville Rage (4)	3–2	Mounties Wanderers (3)
15	Rockdale City Suns (2)	1–2	Bonnyrigg White Eagles (2)
16	Waverley Old Boys (6)	1–4	Fraser Park (3)

Notes

- † = After Extra Time

=== Fifth round ===
A total of 16 teams took part in this stage of the competition. All matches in this round were completed by 8 May 2014.

Tie no	Home team (Tier)	Score	Away team (Tier)
1	Bonnyrigg White Eagles (2)	1–2†	Manly United (2)
2	Blacktown City (2)	2–0	Marconi Stallions (2)
3	Parramatta FC (3)	3–0	Macarthur Rams (3)
4	Sans Souci (6)	0–3	Northern Tigers (3)

Tie no	Home team (Tier)	Score	Away team (Tier)
5	South Coast Wolves (2)	1–1†	Sutherland Sharks (2)
South Coast Wolves advance 4–3 on penalties.
6	Fraser Park (3)	1–8	Sydney United 58 (2)
7	Sydney Olympic (2)	6–0	St George (2)
8	Hakoah Sydney City East (4)	3–1	Granville Rage (4)

Notes

- † = After Extra Time

=== Quarter-finals ===
A total of 8 teams took part in this stage of the competition. The four victorious teams in this round qualified for the 2014 FFA Cup Round of 32, and to the semi-finals of the 2014 Waratah Cup. The losers progressed to the next round. Matches in this round were played on 21 May 2014.

Tie no	Home team (Tier)	Score	Away team (Tier)
1	Sydney Olympic (2)	4–2	Sydney United 58 (2)
2	Hakoah Sydney City East (4)	1–2	Blacktown City (2)
3	Manly United (2)	1–1†	Northern Tigers (3)
Manly United advance 5–4 on penalties.
4	Parramatta FC (3)	2–5†	South Coast Wolves (2)

Notes

- † = After Extra Time

=== Playoff round 1 ===
A total of 4 teams (the losers of the quarter-final fixtures) took part in this stage of the competition. The two victorious teams in this round qualified for the 2014 FFA Cup Round of 32, with the losers progressing to the next round. Matches in this round were played on 4–5 June 2014.

Tie no	Home team (Tier)	Score	Away team (Tier)
1	Sydney United 58 (2)	1–0	Parramatta FC (3)
2	Hakoah Sydney City East (4)	5–1	Northern Tigers (3)

=== Playoff round 2 ===
A total of 2 teams (the losers of the first two playoff matches) took part in this stage of the competition. The victorious team in this round qualified for the 2014 FFA Cup Round of 32. The match in this round was played on 17 June 2014.

Tie no	Home team (Tier)	Score	Away team (Tier)
1	Northern Tigers (3)	0–1	Parramatta FC (3)

== Northern NSW ==
Northern NSW clubs, other than Newcastle Jets in the A-League, qualified for the FFA Cup proper via a state-wide knockout competition called the NNSWF State Cup. This competition was open to all men's NNSWF Premier Competition Clubs and Senior Zone Member Clubs.

Due to travel distances and time restraints, the competition was divided into two pools, the Northern Pool and the Southern Pool, to determine Final Series participants. The Northern Pool (NORTH) was composed of club teams from Football Mid North Coast, North Coast Football, Northern Inland Football and Football Far North Coast. The Southern Pool was split into two further sub-pools, the first (SOUTH) comprising National Premier League and New FM 1st Division club teams and the second (SOUTH-INTER) comprising inter-district club teams from Newcastle Football, Macquarie Football and Hunter Valley Football. Four teams from the Northern pool qualified for the final Series, two teams from the Southern pool (NPL+NEWFM), and two from the Southern inter-district pool (SOUTH-INTER).

A total of 78 Northern New South Wales teams took part in the State-wide Knockout Competition.

=== Schedule ===
Federation	Round	Main date	Number of fixtures	Clubs	New entries this round
Northern NSW	Round 1	2 March 2014	38 + 2 byes	78 → 40	78
Northern NSW	Round 2	16 March 2014	19 + 2 byes	40 → 21	none
Northern NSW	Round 3	30 April 2014	10 + 1 bye	21 → 12	none
Northern NSW	Round 4	21 May 2014	3 + 2 byes	12 → 9	none
Northern NSW	Round 5	28 May 2014	1 + 1 bye	9 → 8	none
Northern NSW	Quarter-finals	21 June 2014	4	8 → 4	none
Northern NSW	Semi-finals	22 June 2014	2	4 → 2	none

=== First round ===
The first round for the Northern Pool took place on 15–16 February 2014. The first round for both the Southern pools was scheduled to be completed by 2 March 2014, although many games were washed out and had to be rescheduled.

Zone	Tie no	Home team (Tier)	Score	Away team (Tier)
NORTH	1	Orara Valley (4)	1–3	Sawtell Scorpions (4)
NORTH	2	Boambee (4)	2–2†	Maclean (4)
Boambee Bombers advance 2–1 on penalties.
NORTH	3	Norths United (4)	1–2	Northern Storm Thunder (4)
NORTH	4	Coffs Coast Tigers (4)	2–2†	Coffs City United (4)
Coffs City United advance 7–6 on penalties.
NORTH	5	Tuncurry Forster (4)	1–8	Urunga (4)
NORTH	6	Nambucca Strikers (4)	1–3	Casino Cobras (4)
NORTH	7	Port Saints (4)	3–5	Tamworth (4)
NORTH	8	Macleay Valley Rangers (4)	2–1	Wingham Warriors (4)
NORTH	9	Inverell Joeys (4)	3–1	Ballina (4)
NORTH	10	Westlawn Tigers (4)	4–1	East Armidale United (4)
NORTH	11	Lennox Head (4)	0–4	Lismore Workers (4)
SOUTH	12	Broadmeadow Magic (2)	9–1	Thornton Redbacks (3)
SOUTH	13	Weston Workers Bears (2)	2–0	Adamstown Rosebud (2)
SOUTH	14	Lambton Jaffas (2)	3–1	Belmont Swansea United (3)
SOUTH	15	Hamilton Olympic (2)	6–1	Singleton (3)
SOUTH	16	South Cardiff (2)	1–1†	Maitland (3)
South Cardiff advance 6–5 on penalties.
SOUTH	17	Charlestown City Blues (2)	4–1	Lake Macquarie City (2)
SOUTH	18	Cessnock City Hornets (3)	0–0†	Toronto Awaba (3)
Cessnock City Hornets advance 5–4 on penalties.
SOUTH	19	Edgeworth Eagles (2)	w/o	West Wallsend (3)

Zone	Tie no	Home team (Tier)	Score	Away team (Tier)
SOUTH-INTER	20	Mayfield United (ZPL) (4)	5–2	Westlakes Wildcats (5)
SOUTH-INTER	21	Belmont Tingira (5)	w/o	Newcastle University (ZL2) (6)
SOUTH-INTER	22	Morisset United (5)	1–2	Nelson Bay (5)
SOUTH-INTER	23	Kotara South (5)	2–1	Beresfield (ZL2) (6)
SOUTH-INTER	24	New Lambton Eagles (4)	7–0	Hunter Simba (7)
SOUTH-INTER	25	Cooks Hill United (ZL3) (7)	0–3	Barnsley United (4)
SOUTH-INTER	26	Cooks Hill United (ZPL) (4)	0–0†	Charlestown City Blues (ZL2) (6)
Cooks Hill United advance 5–3 on penalties.
SOUTH-INTER	27	Dudley Redhead (ZL3) (7)	0–0†	Medowie (6)
Medowie advance 3–0 on penalties.
SOUTH-INTER	28	Merewether Advance (6)	1–3	Muswellbrook (6)
SOUTH-INTER	29	Garden Suburb (5)	2–6	Dudley Redhead (ZPL) (4)
SOUTH-INTER	30	Newcastle University (ZPL) (4)	3–0	RAAF Williamtown (7)
SOUTH-INTER	31	Plattsburg Maryland (6)	0–5	Swansea (4)
SOUTH-INTER	32	Wallsend (4)	2–2†	Cardiff City (4)
Cardiff City advance 11–10 on penalties.
SOUTH-INTER	33	Dungog (7)	2–2†	Mayfield United (ZL3) (7)
Dungog advance 8–7 on penalties.
SOUTH-INTER	34	Jesmond (5)	1–1†	Hamilton Olympic (ZL2) (6)
Jesmond advance 4–3 on penalties.
SOUTH-INTER	35	Tenambit Sharks (7)	2–0	Stockton Sharks (6)
SOUTH-INTER	36	Kurri Kurri (7)	2–5	Raymond Terrace (6)
SOUTH-INTER	37	Toronto Awaba Juniors SC (7)	0–5	Newcastle Suns (5)
SOUTH-INTER	38	Beresfield (ZL1) (5)	3–1	Warners Bay (5)

Notes

- w/o = Walkover
- † = After Extra Time
- Byes : Kahibah (4) and Valentine (3).

=== Second round ===
The second round for all pools was scheduled to be completed by 16 March 2014. However, several matches were delayed due to the wet weather issues from Round 1.

Zone	Tie no	Home team (Tier)	Score	Away team (Tier)
NORTH	1	Westlawn Tigers (4)	0–2	Coffs City United (4)
NORTH	2	Boambee (4)	4–1	Sawtell Scorpions (4)
NORTH	3	Macleay Valley Rangers (4)	w/o	Casino Cobras (4)
NORTH	4	Urunga (4)	3–0	Northern Storm Thunder (4)
NORTH	5	Tamworth (4)	1–3	Lismore Workers (4)
SOUTH	6	Broadmeadow Magic (2)	3–1	Charlestown City Blues (2)
SOUTH	7	Weston Workers Bears (2)	5–1	Valentine (3)
SOUTH	8	Cessnock City Hornets (3)	0–4	Lambton Jaffas (2)
SOUTH	9	Hamilton Olympic (2)	0–1	South Cardiff (2)
SOUTH-INTER	10	Kahibah (4)	0–0†	Raymond Terrace (6)
Kahibah advance 3–2 on penalties.

Zone	Tie no	Home team (Tier)	Score	Away team (Tier)
SOUTH-INTER	11	Nelson Bay (5)	1–1†	Kotara South (5)
Kotara South advance 4–2 on penalties.
SOUTH-INTER	12	Cardiff City (4)	3–4	Mayfield United (ZPL) (4)
SOUTH-INTER	13	Muswellbrook (6)	0–4	Cooks Hill United (ZPL) (4)
SOUTH-INTER	14	Tenambit Sharks (7)	1–4	Swansea (4)
SOUTH-INTER	15	New Lambton Eagles (4)	3–1	Newcastle University (ZL2) (6)
SOUTH-INTER	16	Barnsley United (4)	3–2	Newcastle Suns (5)
SOUTH-INTER	17	Newcastle University (ZPL) (4)	3–1	Dudley Redhead (ZPL) (4)
SOUTH-INTER	18	Medowie (6)	2–1	Beresfield (ZL1) (5)
SOUTH-INTER	19	Dungog (7)	1–7	Jesmond (5)

Notes

- w/o = Walkover
- † = After Extra Time
- Byes : Edgeworth Eagles (2) and Inverell Joeys (4).

=== Third round ===
Matches were scheduled for the Northern Pool on 26–27 April 2014, for the Southern (NPL+NEWFM) pool on 22–23 March 2014, for the Southern inter-district pool (SOUTH-INTER), all games were completed by 23 April 2014.

Although Inverell Joeys lost, they were then drawn as a 'lucky loser' for the final series, at the same time as the Round Four draw was undertaken for the Southern inter-district pool (SOUTH-INTER).

Zone	Tie no	Home team (Tier)	Score	Away team (Tier)
NORTH	1	Boambee (4)	5–0	Macleay Valley Rangers (4)
NORTH	2	Lismore Workers (4)	1–1†	Coffs City United (4)
Lismore Workers advance 4–2 on penalties.
NORTH	3	Urunga (4)	5–1	Inverell Joeys (4)
Inverell Joeys advance as a 'lucky loser'.
SOUTH	4	Weston Workers Bears (2)	2–3	South Cardiff (2)
SOUTH	5	Edgeworth Eagles (2)	2–0	Lambton Jaffas (2)

Zone	Tie no	Home team (Tier)	Score	Away team (Tier)
SOUTH-INTER	6	Kahibah (4)	0–1	Kotara South (5)
SOUTH-INTER	7	Swansea (4)	1–0	Newcastle University (ZPL) (4)
SOUTH-INTER	8	Jesmond (5)	2–5	Cooks Hill United (ZPL) (4)
SOUTH-INTER	9	Barnsley United (4)	2–5	New Lambton Eagles (4)
SOUTH-INTER	10	Medowie (6)	1–1†	Mayfield United (ZPL) (4)
Medowie advance 4–3 on penalties

Notes

- † = After Extra Time
- Bye: Broadmeadow Magic (2).

=== Fourth round ===
Matches for the Southern (NPL+NEWFM) pool were scheduled for 7 May 2014, and matches for the Southern inter-district pool (SOUTH-INTER) on 21 May 2014.

Zone	Tie no	Home team (Tier)	Score	Away team (Tier)
SOUTH	1	Edgeworth Eagles (2)	0–2	Broadmeadow Magic (2)
SOUTH-INTER	2	Swansea (4)	0–0†	New Lambton Eagles (4)
New Lambton Eagles advance 4–1 on penalties.
SOUTH-INTER	3	Medowie (6)	0–1	Cooks Hill United (ZPL) (4)

Notes

- † = After Extra Time
- Byes: Kotara South (5) and South Cardiff (2).

=== Fifth round ===
The match for the Southern inter-district pool (SOUTH-INTER) was scheduled for 28 May 2014.

Zone	Tie no	Home team (Tier)	Score	Away team (Tier)
SOUTH-INTER	1	Kotara South (5)	0–1	Cooks Hill United (ZPL) (4)

Notes

- Bye: New Lambton Eagles (4).

=== Quarter-finals ===
A total of 8 teams took part in this stage of the competition; four teams from the Northern Pool, two teams from the Southern Pool (NPL+NEWFM) and two from the inter-district Southern Pool (SOUTH-INTER). Matches in this round were played on 21 June 2014, at the neutral venue of Coffs Harbour International Stadium.

Tie no	Team (Tier)	Score	Team (Tier)
1	Inverell Joeys (4)	2–3	Cooks Hill United (ZPL) (4)
2	South Cardiff (2)	5–2	Urunga (4)
3	Boambee (4)	2–0	New Lambton Eagles (4)
4	Broadmeadow Magic (2)	5–1	Lismore Workers (4)

=== Semi-finals ===
A total of 4 teams took part in this stage of the competition. The two victorious teams in this round qualified for the 2014 FFA Cup Round of 32, and qualified for the final of the NNSWF State Cup. Matches in this round were played on 22 June 2014, at the neutral venue of Coffs Harbour International Stadium.

Tie no	Home team (Tier)	Score	Away team (Tier)
1	South Cardiff (2)	3–1	Cooks Hill United (ZPL) (4)
2	Broadmeadow Magic (2)	5–1	Boambee (4)

== Queensland ==
Queensland clubs, other than Brisbane Roar in the A-League, qualified for the FFA Cup proper via the FQ Cup 2014 and the parallel linked Canale Travel Cup competition. The FQ Cup was split into three regionalised zones; North Queensland (NTH), South East Queensland (SEQ) (excluding Brisbane), and Brisbane (BNE).

The North Queensland Zone comprised 4 sub zones; Far North Queensland (FNQ), North Queensland (NQ), Mackay Regional (MRF), and Central Queensland (CQ). The South East Queensland Zone comprised 4 sub zones; Wide Bay (WB), Sunshine Coast (SC), South West Queensland (SWQ), and Gold Coast (GC).

The 4 semi finalists qualified for the FFA Cup, with 1 team coming from North Queensland, 1 coming from South East Queensland and 2 coming from Brisbane. The two finalists of Brisbane's Canale Cup qualified for both the FFA Cup and the FQ Cup semi-finals.

=== Schedule ===
Federation	Round	Main date	Number of fixtures	Clubs	New entries this round
Queensland	Qualifying round	16 February 2014	16	121 → 105	32
Queensland	Round 1	23 February 2014	36	105 → 69	56
Queensland	Round 2	9 March 2014	22	69 → 47	8
Queensland	Round 3	23 March 2014	17 + 3 byes	47 → 30	12
Queensland	Round 4	20 April 2014	14	30 → 16	13
Queensland	Round 5	11 May 2014	8	16 → 8	none
Queensland	Quarter-finals	27 May–21 June 2014	4	8 → 4	none

=== Qualifying round ===
A total of 32 Queensland teams took part in this stage of the competition. All matches in this round were completed by 22 February 2014.

Zone	Tie no	Home team (Tier)	Score	Away team (Tier)
BNE	1	The Lakes (7)	1–3	Park Ridge (5)
BNE	2	Virginia United (6)	4–3	Brighton Bulldogs (6)
BNE	3	Samford Rangers (5)	w/o	Acacia Ridge (7)
BNE	4	Narangba United (6)	2–4	Slacks Creek Tigers (5)
BNE	5	AC Carina (6)	3–0	Newmarket (5)
BNE	6	Logan Village Falcons (7)	1–0	Tarragindi Tigers (7)
BNE	7	Redcliffe PCYC (5)	5–0	Bardon Latrobe (7)
BNE	8	Toowong (6)	14–0	Mooroondu (7)

Zone	Tie no	Home team (Tier)	Score	Away team (Tier)
BNE	9	Westside (6)	0–4	Centenary Stormers (6)
BNE	10	Kangaroo Point Rovers (5)	2–1	Bethania Rams (7)
BNE	11	Jimboomba United (6)	2–1	New Farm United (6)
BNE	12	Oxley United (5)	5–2	Ridge Hills United (6)
BNE	13	Greenbank (7)	1–5	Logan City Kings (6)
BNE	14	Clairvaux (6)	2–5	Holland Park Hawks (5)
NQ	15	Brothers Townsville (3)	3–1	MA Olympic (3)
MRF	16	Mackay Lions (3)	3–2	Mackay Crusaders (3)

Notes

- w/o = Walkover
- Byes – The Gap (5), Taringa Rovers (4), Western Spirit (5) and Ipswich City (5).

=== First round ===
A total of 72 Queensland teams took part in this stage of the competition. All matches in this round were completed by 13 March 2014.

Zone	Tie no	Home team (Tier)	Score	Away team (Tier)
BNE	1	Samford Rangers (5)	0–5	The Gap (5)
BNE	2	Taringa Rovers (4)	1–2	Slacks Creek Tigers (5)
BNE	3	Western Spirit (5)	6–0	Oxley United (5)
BNE	4	Souths United (4)	3–4	Pine Hills (4)
BNE	5	Logan City Kings (6)	1–7	Ipswich City (5)
BNE	6	North Pine (4)	0–4	Southside Eagles (4)
BNE	7	Moggill (4)	5–3	Grange Thistle (4)
BNE	8	Brisbane Knights (5)	3–1	Pine Rivers United (4)
BNE	9	Annerley (4)	2–1	Mount Gravatt Hawks (4)
BNE	10	Jimboomba United (6)	0–1	Holland Park Hawks (5)
BNE	11	AC Carina (6)	3–4†	Park Ridge (5)
BNE	12	Virginia United (6)	1–1†	Toowong (6)
Virginia United advance 5–4 on penalties.
BNE	13	Centenary Stormers (6)	7–4	Logan Village Falcons (7)
BNE	14	Kangaroo Point Rovers (5)	4–3	Redcliffe PCYC (5)
FNQ	15	Innisfail United (3)	1–8	Mareeba United (3)
FNQ	16	Marlin Coast Rangers (3)	0–2	Douglas United (3)
FNQ	17	Edge Hill United (3)	2–3	Stratford Dolphins (3)
NQ	18	Brothers Townsville (3)	9–0	Saints Souths Eagles (3)

Zone	Tie no	Home team (Tier)	Score	Away team (Tier)
NQ	19	Burdekin (3)	5–2	Ross River (3)
NQ	20	Wulguru United (3)	1–3	Townsville Warriors (3)
NQ	21	Ingham (3)	0–4	Townsville Rebels (3)
MRF	22	Whitsunday (3)	6–0	Mackay Rangers (4)
MRF	23	Mackay Magpies (3)	2–0	Mackay Wanderers (3)
MRF	24	Mackay City Brothers (3)	1–1†	Mackay Lions (3)
Mackay City Brothers advance 3–0 on penalties.
MRF	25	Country United (3)	3–4	Mackay West United (4)
CQ	26	Central Queensland Mariners (5)	1–6	Clinton (3)
CQ	27	Frenchville (3)	5–6	Capricorn Coast (3)
CQ	28	Gladstone Central (3)	0–3	Southside United (3)
WB	29	Alloway (3)	3–4	Gympie Diggers (4)
WB	30	Across The Waves (3)	6–0	Bundaberg Diggers (3)
SC	31	Maroochydore FC (3)	1–9	Woombye FC (3)
SC	32	Caboolture Sports (3)	0–11	Caloundra FC (3)
SC	33	Kawana FC (3)	2–0	Buderim Wanderers (3)
SC	34	Nambour Yandina United (3)	0–8	Noosa Lions (3)
SWQ	35	Willowburn (3)	6–0	Chinchilla Bears (4)
SWQ	36	University Southern Queensland (3)	2–1	Warwick Wanderers (3)

Notes

- † = After Extra Time
- Byes – Leichhardt (3), Nerimbera (3), Bingera (3), Moore Park (3), Nanango (3), and Gatton (3).

=== Second round ===
A total of 44 Queensland teams took part in this stage of the competition. All matches in this round were completed by 2 April 2014. New teams entering this round were Bayside United and Mitchelton.

Zone	Tie no	Home team	Score	Away team
BNE	1	Western Spirit (5)	3–2	Mitchelton (4)
BNE	2	Pine Hills (4)	2–2†	Annerley (4)
Annerley advance 6–5 on penalties.
BNE	3	Ipswich City (5)	3–3†	Kangaroo Point Rovers (5)
Kangaroo Point Rovers advance 4–1 on penalties.
BNE	4	Southside Eagles (4)	1–3	Bayside United (4)
BNE	5	Moggill (4)	1–4	Holland Park Hawks (5)
BNE	6	Centenary Stormers (6)	8–2	Brisbane Knights (5)
BNE	7	Virginia United (6)	4–0	Slacks Creek Tigers (5)
BNE	8	The Gap (5)	2–0	Park Ridge (5)
FNQ	9	Douglas United (3)	0–2	Mareeba United (3)
FNQ	10	Leichhardt (3)	1–1†	Stratford Dolphins (3)
Stratford Dolphins advance 4–2 on penalties.
NQ	11	Townsville Warriors (3)	5–1	Townsville Rebels (3)

Zone	Tie no	Home team (Tier)	Score	Away team (Tier)
NQ	12	Burdekin (3)	1–2	Brothers Townsville (3)
MRF	13	Whitsunday (3)	10–1	Mackay West United (4)
MRF	14	Mackay City Brothers (3)	0–5	Mackay Magpies (3)
CQ	15	Capricorn Coast (3)	1–3	Clinton (3)
CQ	16	Nerimbera (3)	1–1†	Southside United (3)
Southside United advance 5–4 on penalties.
WB	17	Moore Park (3)	1–2	Bingera (3)
WB	18	Across The Waves (3)	0–2	Gympie Diggers (4)
SC	19	Woombye FC (3)	4–4†	Noosa Lions (3)
Noosa Lions advance 4–3 on penalties.
SC	20	Kawana FC (3)	0–2	Caloundra FC (3)
SWQ	21	University Southern Queensland (3)	3–6	Willowburn (3)
SWQ	22	Gatton (3)	0–2	Nanango (3)

Notes

- † = After Extra Time

=== Third round ===
A total of 34 Queensland teams took part in this stage of the competition. Twelve Brisbane Premier League teams (Tier 3) entered into the competition at this stage. All matches in this round were completed by 17 April 2014.

Zone	Tie no	Home team (Tier)	Score	Away team (Tier)
BNE	1	Centenary Stormers (6)	4–3	Virginia United (6)
BNE	2	Peninsula Power (3)	3–2	Albany Creek (3)
BNE	3	Brisbane Force (3)	0–1	Queensland Lions (3)
BNE	4	Kangaroo Point Rovers (5)	3–2	Western Spirit (5)
BNE	5	Annerley (4)	0–1	Rochedale Rovers (3)
BNE	6	University of Queensland (3)	0–4	Holland Park Hawks (5)
BNE	7	Logan Lightning (3)	5–0	The Gap (5)
BNE	8	Capalaba (3)	3–0	North Star (3)
BNE	9	Bayside United (4)	0–1	Ipswich Knights (3)

Zone	Tie no	Home team (Tier)	Score	Away team (Tier)
BNE	10	Eastern Suburbs (3)	2–4†	Wolves FC (3)
FNQ	11	Mareeba United (3)	2–1	Stratford Dolphins (3)
NQ	12	Townsville Warriors (3)	0–2	Brothers Townsville (3)
MRF	13	Whitsunday (3)	3–6	Mackay Magpies (3)
CQ	14	Clinton (3)	3–2	Southside United (3)
WB	15	Bingera (3)	1–5†	Gympie Diggers (4)
SC	16	Noosa Lions (3)	1–2	Caloundra FC (3)
SWQ	17	Nanango (3)	1–2	Willowburn (3)

Notes

- † = After Extra Time

=== Fourth round ===
A total of 28 Queensland teams took part in this stage of the competition. Twelve Queensland National Premier League teams, plus Murwillumbah, entered into the competition at this stage. All matches in this round were completed by 4 May 2014. Central Queensland Energy were removed from the NPL in March 2014 – and therefore from the qualifiers – after failing to meet licensing conditions.

Zone	Tie no	Home team (Tier)	Score	Away team (Tier)
BNE	1	Ipswich Knights (3)	3–0	Western Pride (2)
BNE	2	Capalaba (3)	0–5	Brisbane Strikers (2)
BNE	3	Rochedale Rovers (3)	1–0	Holland Park Hawks (5)
BNE	4	Redlands United (2)	1–3	Wolves FC (3)
BNE	5	Kangaroo Point Rovers (5)	1–3	Peninsula Power (3)
BNE	6	Brisbane City (2)	0–1	Logan Lightning (3)
BNE	7	Moreton Bay United (2)	2–5	Queensland Lions (3)
BNE	8	Centenary Stormers (6)	0–6	Olympic FC (2)

Zone	Tie no	Home team	Score	Away team
FNQ	9	Mareeba United (3)	3–5	Far North Queensland FC (2)
NQ	10	Brothers Townsville (3)	1–2	Northern Fury (2)
CQ	11	Clinton (3)	w/o	Central Queensland (2)
SC	12	Caloundra FC (3)	3–3†	Sunshine Coast (2)
Caloundra advance 4–2 on penalties.
SWQ	13	Willowburn (3)	1–2†	South West Queensland Thunder (2)
GC	14	Murwillumbah (3)	0–8	Palm Beach (2)

Notes

- w/o = Walkover
- † = After Extra Time
- Byes – Mackay Magpies (3) and Gympie Diggers (4).

=== Fifth round ===
A total of 16 Queensland teams took part in this stage of the competition. All matches in this round were completed by 24 May 2014.

Zone	Tie no	Home team (Tier)	Score	Away team (Tier)
BNE	1	Queensland Lions (3)	2–1	Logan Lightning (3)
BNE	2	Wolves FC (3)	1–4	Olympic FC (2)
BNE	3	Rochedale Rovers (3)	0–2	Peninsula Power (3)
BNE	4	Brisbane Strikers (2)	7–1	Ipswich Knights (3)

Zone	Tie no	Home team (Tier)	Score	Away team (Tier)
FNQ v NQ	5	Far North Queensland FC (2)	4–1	Northern Fury (2)
MRF v CQ	6	Mackay Magpies (3)	7–0	Clinton (3)
WB v SC	7	Gympie Diggers (4)	0–5	Caloundra FC (3)
SWQ v GC	8	South West Queensland Thunder (2)	0–4	Palm Beach (2)

=== Quarter-finals ===
A total of 8 Queensland teams took part in this stage of the competition. The four victorious teams in this round qualified for the 2014 FFA Cup Round of 32. Matches in this round were played on 27 May–21 June 2014.

Zone	Tie no	Home team (Tier)	Score	Away team (Tier)
BNE	1	Brisbane Strikers (2)	3–2	Queensland Lions (3)
BNE	2	Peninsula Power (3)	1–2	Olympic FC (2)
NQL	3	Far North Queensland FC (2)	6–1	Mackay Magpies (3)
SEQ	4	Caloundra FC (3)	0–1	Palm Beach (2)

== South Australia ==
South Australian clubs, other than Adelaide United in the A-League, may qualify for the FFA Cup via the 2014 Coca-Cola Federation Cup. One place from South Australia (the winner of the Final) will qualify for the 2014 FFA Cup.

=== Schedule ===
Federation	Round	Main date	Number of fixtures	Clubs	New entries this round
South Australia	Round 1	15 February–2 March 2014	13 + 3 byes	29 → 16	29
South Australia	Round 2	5 April 2014	8	16 → 8	none
South Australia	Quarter-finals	21–30 April 2014	4	8 → 4	none
South Australia	Semi-finals	7–14 May 2014	2	4 → 2	none
South Australia	Final	31 May 2014	1	2 → 1	none

=== First round ===
A total of 26 South Australian teams took part in this stage of the competition. Matches in this round were played on 15 February–2 March 2014.

Tie no	Home team (Tier)	Score	Away team (Tier)
1	Cumberland United (2)	6–0	Gawler (3)
2	West Adelaide (2)	1–0	Adelaide Cobras (3)
3	Eastern United (3)	2–3	West Torrens Birkalla (2)
4	Western Strikers (2)	4–1	Sturt Lions (3)
5	Noarlunga United (3)	2–2†	The Cove (3)
The Cove advance 5–3 on penalties.
6	Adelaide Raiders (2)	1–4	Adelaide City (2)

Tie no	Home team (Tier)	Score	Away team (Tier)
7	Adelaide Olympic (3)	3–1	Northern Demons (3)
8	White City Woodville (2)	1–2	Para Hills Knights (2)
9	Seaford Rangers (3)	3–7	Modbury Jets (3)
10	South Adelaide Panthers (2)	1–0	Port Adelaide Pirates (3)
11	Playford City Patriots (3)	3–4	Adelaide Blue Eagles (2)
12	Salisbury United (3)	0–4	Adelaide Comets (2)
13	Campbelltown City (2)	2–1	Adelaide Hills Hawks (3)

Notes

- † = After Extra Time
- Byes – Croydon Kings (2), MetroStars (2) and Western Toros (3).

=== Second round ===
A total of 16 South Australian teams took part in this stage of the competition. Matches in this round were played on 5 April 2014.

Tie no	Home team (Tier)	Score	Away team (Tier)
1	Para Hills Knights (2)	4–3†	Adelaide Comets (2)
2	Western Toros (3)	1–4	West Adelaide (2)
3	Cumberland United (2)	1–3	Croydon Kings (2)
4	South Adelaide Panthers (2)	0–0†	West Torrens Birkalla (2)
West Torrens Birkalla advance 7–6 on penalties.

Tie no	Home team (Tier)	Score	Away team (Tier)
5	Adelaide City (2)	4–1	Adelaide Blue Eagles (2)
6	Adelaide Olympic (3)	0–1	The Cove (3)
7	MetroStars (2)	1–0†	Campbelltown City (2)
8	Western Strikers (2)	3–2†	Modbury Jets (3)

Notes

- † = After Extra Time

=== Quarter-finals ===
A total of 8 South Australian teams took part in this stage of the competition. Matches in this round were played on 21–30 April 2014.

Tie no	Home team (Tier)	Score	Away team (Tier)
1	The Cove (3)	0–1	Croydon Kings (2)
2	MetroStars (2)	1–1†	Adelaide City (2)
Adelaide City advance 5–4 on penalties
3	Para Hills Knights (2)	1–4†	West Adelaide (2)
4	West Torrens Birkalla (2)	0–2	Western Strikers (2)

Notes

- † = After Extra Time

=== Semi-finals ===
A total of 4 South Australian teams took part in this stage of the competition. Matches in this round were played on 7–14 May 2014.

Tie no	Home team (Tier)	Score	Away team (Tier)
1	Croydon Kings (2)	1–3	Adelaide City (2)
2	Western Strikers (2)	1–5	West Adelaide (2)

=== Final ===
A total of 2 South Australian teams took part in this stage of the competition. The victorious team in this round qualified for the 2014 FFA Cup. The match in this round was played on 31 May 2014.

Tie no	Home team (Tier)	Score	Away team (Tier)
1	Adelaide City (2)	4–1	West Adelaide (2)

== Tasmania ==
Tasmanian clubs qualify for the FFA Cup via the Milan Lakoseljac Cup. One place from Tasmania (the winner of the Final) will qualify for the 2014 FFA Cup.

=== Schedule ===
Federation	Round	Main date	Number of fixtures	Clubs	New entries this round
Tasmania	Qualifying round	8 March 2014	3 + 1 bye	19 → 16	7
Tasmania	Round 1	23 March 2014	8	16 → 8	12
Tasmania	Quarter-finals	21 April 2014	4	8 → 4	none
Tasmania	Semi-finals	4 May 2014	2	4 → 2	none
Tasmania	Final	9 June 2014	1	2 → 1	none

=== Qualifying round ===
A total of 7 Tasmanian teams took part in this stage of the competition. Byes to the Round of 16 were given to two clubs. Matches in this round were played on 10 March 2014.

Tie no	Home team (Tier)	Score	Away team (Tier)
1	Tasmania University (3)	6–0	New Town Eagles (3)
2	Clarence United (3)	4–2	Riverside Olympic (3)
3	Nelson Eastern Suburbs (3)	w/o	Prospect Knights (3)

Notes

- w/o = Walkover
- Bye – Burnie United.

=== First round ===
A total of 16 Tasmanian teams took part in this stage of the competition. Clubs from the T-League a conference of the National Premier Leagues and the top two clubs from the Northern Premier League and Southern Premier League in 2013 were admitted into the competition at this stage. Matches in this round were played on 15–23 March 2014.

Tie no	Home team (Tier)	Score	Away team (Tier)
1	Devonport City (2)	6–0	Ulverstone (3)
2	Launceston City (2)	3–1	Somerset (3)
3	Glenorchy Knights (2)	0–1	Tasmania University (3)
4	South Hobart (2)	11–1	Nelson Eastern Suburbs (3)

Tie no	Home team (Tier)	Score	Away team (Tier)
5	Taroona FC (3)	0–1	Clarence United (3)
6	Northern Rangers (2)	3–0	Hobart Olympia (2)
7	Tilford Zebras (2)	w/o	Burnie United (3)
8	Beachside (3)	0–5	Kingborough Lions (2)

Notes

- w/o = Walkover

=== Quarter-finals ===
A total of 8 Tasmanian teams took part in this stage of the competition. Matches in this round were played on 21 April 2014.

Tie no	Home team (Tier)	Score	Away team (Tier)
1	Clarence United (3)	0–4	Tilford Zebras (2)
2	Northern Rangers (2)	4–1	Devonport City (2)
3	Tasmania University (3)	1–2†	Kingborough Lions (2)
4	Launceston City (2)	1–3	South Hobart (2)

Notes

- † = After Extra Time

=== Semi-finals ===
A total of 4 Tasmanian teams took part in this stage of the competition. Matches in this round were played on 3–4 May 2014.

Tie no	Home team (Tier)	Score	Away team (Tier)
1	South Hobart (2)	5–1	Northern Rangers (2)
2	Kingborough Lions (2)	0–7	Tilford Zebras (2)

=== Final ===
A total of 2 Tasmanian teams took part in this stage of the competition. The victorious team in this round qualified for the 2014 FFA Cup Round of 32. This match was played on 9 June 2014.

Tie no	Home team (Tier)	Score	Away team (Tier)
1	South Hobart (2)	3–0	Tilford Zebras (2)

== Victoria ==
Victorian clubs, other than A-League clubs, will qualify for the final rounds of the FFA Cup via the 2014 Dockerty Cup (formerly known as the FFV State Knockout Cup). Other than the two A-League teams, four teams from Victoria (the semi-finalists) will qualify for the Round of 32.

=== Schedule ===
Federation	Round	Main date	Number of fixtures	Clubs	New entries this round
Victoria	Round 1	1–4 March 2014	30 + 10 byes	190 → 160	70
Victoria	Round 2	7–9 March 2014	56	160 → 104	72
Victoria	Round 3	14–22 March 2014	40	104 → 64	24
Victoria	Round 4	20 March–15 April 2014	32	64 → 32	24
Victoria	Round 5	17 April–14 May 2014	16	32 → 16	none
Victoria	Round 6	28 May–4 June 2014	8	16 → 8	none
Victoria	Quarter-finals	11–25 June 2014	4	8 → 4	none

=== First round ===
A total of 70 teams took part in this stage of the competition, which was open to teams from the Victorian State League Division 5, regional, metros and masters leagues. Teams were seeded in terms of which round they would enter based on their Division in 2013. Tiers in the table refer to the current (2014) division, after a major reorganization of the Victorian competition structure. A total of 10 teams were given a Bye to the second round. Matches in this round were played on 1–4 March 2014.

Tie no	Home team (Tier)	Score	Away team (Tier)
1	Old Trinity Grammarians (8)	3–0	Old Ivanhoe Grammarians (8)
2	Altona North (7)	1–1†	East Bentleigh (8)
East Bentleigh advance 5–4 on penalties.
3	Greenvale United (8)	w/o	Lyndale United (7)
4	Ringwood City (7)	w/o	Melton Phoenix (7)
5	Baxter (8)	0–5	Springvale City (8)
6	Dandenong Wolves (8)	3–1	Glen Waverley (8)
7	Wangaratta City (9)	0–5	Mazenod United (7)
Mazenod United removed from competition for fielding an ineligible player.
8	Old Mentonians (7)	1–0	Mitchell Rangers (8)
9	Brimbank Stallions (7)	2–1	Manningham United FC (7)
10	Fawkner (7)	0–5	Shepparton South (9)
11	Albert Park (8)	2–1	Swinburne University (8)
12	Kyneton District (8)	w/o	Endeavour Hills (8)
13	West Preston (7)	w/o	Reservoir Yeti (8)
14	Whitehorse United (7)	w/o	Light United (8)
15	Yarra Jets (8)	0–14	Eltham Redbacks (8)
16	Twin City Wanderers (9)	w/o	Healesville (8)

Tie no	Home team (Tier)	Score	Away team (Tier)
17	Spring Hills (8)	0–1	Parkville Panthers (7)
Parkville Panthers removed from competition for fielding an ineligible player.
18	Banksia Power (8)	w/o	Sebastopol Vikings (7)
19	Melbourne Tornado (9)	w/o	Boroondara Eagles (7)
20	Cobram Victory (9)	4–2	Old Xaverians (8)
21	Heidelberg Eagles (7)	2–3	Watsonia Heights (7)
22	Point Cook (7)	3–2	Laverton Park (7)
23	Keon Park (8)	3–4	Prahran City (8)
Prahran City removed from competition for fielding an ineligible player.
24	Sandown Lions (7)	w/o	Balmoral (8)
25	Truganina Hornets (8)	4–3	St Kevins Old Boys (8)
Truganina Hornets removed from competition for fielding an ineligible player.
26	Mill Park (8)	2–0	RMIT (10)
27	Northern United (8)	w/o	Oak Park (8)
28	Melbourne City (7)	4–1	Montrose (8)
29	Meadow Park Eagles (7)	w/o	Melbourne Lions (8)
30	Lillydale Eagles (8)	w/o	Sporting Carlton (8)

Notes

- w/o = Walkover
- † = After Extra Time
- Byes – Brighton (7), Bundoora United (7), Chelsea (8), Harrisfield Hurricanes (8), Keilor Wolves (8), Kings Domain (8), Lara (8), Noble Park (7), Parkmore (8), White Star Dandenong (8).

=== Second round ===
A total of 112 teams took part in this stage of the competition. 72 Clubs from the clubs from the Victorian State League Division 4 and Division 3 entered into the competition at this stage. Teams were seeded in terms of which round they would enter based on their Division in 2013. Tiers in the table refer to the current (2014) division. Matches in this round were played on 7–9 March 2014.

Tie no	Home team (Tier)	Score	Away team (Tier)
1	Melbourne City (7)	1–0	Old Melburnians (6)
2	Sebastopol Vikings (7)	w/o	Moreland United (5)
3	Meadow Park Eagles (7)	3–2	Albert Park (8)
4	Corio (5)	1–1†	Essendon United (6)
Corio advance 6–5 on penalties.
5	Waverley Wanderers (7)	1–2	Banyule City (5)
6	Altona City (6)	w/o	Brunswick Zebras (6)
7	Rowville Eagles (7)	3–2	Maribyrnong Greens (7)
8	Western Eagles (6)	0–4	Westvale (5)
9	Oak Park (8)	w/o	Williamstown SC (6)
10	Lillydale Eagles (8)	w/o	Hoppers Crossing (7)
11	Spring Hills FC (8)	2–4†	Shepparton South (9)
12	Wangaratta City (9)	w/o	Knox City (6)
13	Geelong Rangers (6)	2–0	Monash University (6)
14	Geelong (5)	w/o	Essendon Royals (6)
15	South Yarra FC (6)	7–3	Collingwood City FC (7)
16	Parkmore FC (8)	4–0	Middle Park FC (6)
17	Whittlesea United (6)	5–1	Brimbank Stallions (7)
18	Bell Park (7)	4–2	Bundoora United (7)
19	FC Strathmore (7)	2–3	Skye United (7)
20	Sporting Whittlesea (5)	1–1†	Caulfield United Cobras (6)
Sporting Whittlesea advance 5–4 on penalties.
21	Mooroolbark (5)	w/o	Light United (8)
22	Epping City (7)	2–3	Elwood City (6)
23	Mill Park (8)	w/o	Upfield (7)
24	Old Scotch (5)	4–0	Springvale City (8)
25	Seaford United (5)	1–1†	St. Kilda (7)
St. Kilda advance 5–3 on penalties.
26	Monbulk Rangers (6)	5–0	Balmoral (8)
27	North City Wolves (6)	0–3	Beaumaris (5)
28	Lara (8)	0–3	North Sunshine Eagles (5)

Tie no	Home team (Tier)	Score	Away team (Tier)
29	North Caulfield (5)	w/o	Yarraville (5)
30	Cobram Victory (9)	w/o	Riversdale (6)
31	Sunbury United (4)	w/o	Hume United (5)
32	Frankston Pines (5)	6–0	Old Mentonians (7)
33	Kyneton District (8)	4–1	Greenvale United (8)
34	Peninsula Strikers (5)	1–2	Darebin United (7)
35	Endeavour United (7)	0–4	Eltham Redbacks (8)
36	Old Camberwell Grammarians (7)	w/o	Kings Domain (8)
37	Melbourne University (5)	6–0	Keon Park (8)
38	Harrisfield Hurricanes (8)	w/o	West Preston (7)
39	Northern Roosters (6)	3–0	Hampton Park United Sparrows (7)
40	Croydon City Arrows (7)	3–0	Brandon Park (7)
41	Northern Falcons (7)	1–3	East Brighton United (6)
42	Plenty Valley Lions (7)	7–2	Keilor Wolves (8)
43	Sandringham (6)	w/o	Lalor United (6)
44	Warragul United (5)	2–6	Nunawading City (5)
45	Twin City Wanderers (9)	9–0	Watsonia Heights (7)
46	White Star Dandenong (8)	w/o	Heatherton United (5)
47	Berwick City (5)	5–0	Old Trinity Grammarians (8)
48	Brighton (7)	w/o	Surf Coast (7)
49	Heidelberg Stars (5)	7–0	Point Cook (7)
50	Casey Comets (4)	13–0	Chelsea (8)
51	Cairnlea (4)	3–1	Noble Park (4)
52	St Kevins Old Boys SC (8)	3–1	Boroondara Eagles (7)
53	Old Carey (6)	2–0†	Keysborough SC (7)
54	Melton Phoenix (7)	3–4	Ashburton United FC (6)
55	Bayside Argonauts (7)	w/o	Dandenong Wolves (8)
56	East Bentleigh (8)	0–2	Doncaster Rovers (4)

Notes

- w/o = Walkover
- † = After Extra Time

=== Third round ===
A total of 80 teams took part in this stage of the competition. 24 Clubs from the Victorian State League Division 2 entered into the competition at this stage. Teams were seeded in terms of which round they would enter based on their Division in 2013. Tiers in the table refer to the current (2014) division. Matches in this round were played on 14–22 March 2014.

Tie no	Home team (Tier)	Score	Away team (Tier)
1	Bell Park (7)	0–6	Heidelberg Stars (5)
2	Northern Roosters (6)	3–2†	Knox City FC (6)
3	Bayside Argonauts (7)	0–5	Ballarat Red Devils (2)
4	Cobram Victory (9)	w/o	Morwell Pegasus (4)
5	Shepparton South (9)	2–4	Frankston Pines (5)
6	Nunawading City (5)	4–2	Meadow Park Eagles (7)
7	Eltham Redbacks (8)	5–1	Old Camberwell Grammarians (7)
8	FC Clifton Hill (4)	2–1	Hoppers Crossing (7)
9	North Caulfield (5)	5–3	Kyneton District (8)
10	Altona City (6)	1–5	Moreland City (4)
11	Parkmore (8)	1–1†	St Kevins Old Boys (8)
St Kevins Old Boys advance 4–2 on penalties.
12	Malvern City (4)	3–1	Williamstown SC (6)
13	Keilor Park (4)	5–0	Sebastopol Vikings (7)
14	Geelong (5)	1–3	Avondale Heights (3)
15	Surf Coast (7)	1–2	Berwick City (5)
16	Banyule City (5)	1–2	Sydenham Park (4)
17	North Sunshine Eagles (5)	4–1	Altona East Phoenix (4)
18	Upfield (7)	2–3	Westvale (5)
19	La Trobe University (5)	w/o	Brunswick City (3)
20	Sporting Whittlesea (5)	0–4	Sunbury United (4)

Tie no	Home team (Tier)	Score	Away team (Tier)
21	Fitzroy City (4)	1–3	Kingston City (3)
22	Melbourne University (5)	2–0	Monbulk Rangers (6)
23	Corio SC (5)	3–0	Langwarrin (4)
24	St. Kilda (7)	2–1†	Diamond Valley United (4)
25	Doncaster Rovers (4)	1–2	South Springvale (4)
26	Plenty Valley Lions (7)	2–1	Mooroolbark (5)
27	Springvale White Eagles (3)	5–3†	Ashburton United FC (6)
28	Melbourne City (7)	0–2	Elwood City (6)
29	East Brighton United (6)	w/o	Whittlesea Ranges (3)
30	Westgate FC (4)	0–3	Mornington (4)
31	Darebin United (7)	0–6	Old Scotch (5)
32	Rowville Eagles (7)	0–2	Skye United (7)
33	Cairnlea (4)	7–0	West Preston (7)
34	Croydon City Arrows (7)	1–4	Doveton (5)
35	Heatherton United (5)	1–3	Twin City Wanderers (9)
36	Dandenong City (3)	4–4†	Preston Lions (4)
Preston Lions advance 4–2 on penalties.
37	Geelong Rangers (6)	w/o	Beaumaris (5)
38	Old Carey (6)	0–4	Noble Park United (4)
39	Casey Comets (4)	2–1	Lalor United (6)
40	Whittlesea United (6)	3–1	South Yarra FC (6)

Notes

- w/o = Walkover
- † = After Extra Time

=== Fourth round ===
A total of 64 teams took part in this stage of the competition. 12 Clubs from the Victorian Premier League and 12 clubs from the Victorian State League Division 1 entered into the competition at this stage. Teams were seeded in terms of which round they would enter based on their Division in 2013. Tiers in the table refer to the current (2014) division. Matches in this round were played on 20 March–15 April 2014.

Tie no	Home team (Tier)	Score	Away team (Tier)
1	Westvale (5)	7–2	Nunawading City (5)
2	Twin City Wanderers (9)	1–5	Avondale Heights (3)
3	Port Melbourne (2)	0–3	Northcote City (2)
4	Corio (5)	2–2†	Frankston Pines (5)
Frankston Pines advance 4–2 on penalties.
5	Beaumaris (5)	3–2	Heidelberg Stars (5)
6	Bulleen Lions (3)	3–1	Moreland City (4)
7	Oakleigh Cannons (2)	1–2	Werribee City (2)
8	Old Scotch (5)	0–4	Richmond (3)
9	Sydenham Park (4)	0–4	Keilor Park (4)
10	Doveton (5)	3–2	North Caulfield (5)
11	Box Hill United (3)	2–2†	North Sunshine Eagles (5)
North Sunshine Eagles advance 5–4 on penalties.
12	North Geelong Warriors (3)	0–2	Preston Lions (4)
13	Bentleigh Greens (2)	3–0	St. Kilda (7)
14	Brunswick City (3)	0–1	Elwood City (6)
15	Pascoe Vale (2)	0–1	South Springvale (4)
16	Hume City (2)	5–0	Casey Comets (4)

Tie no	Home team (Tier)	Score	Away team (Tier)
17	Clifton Hill (4)	1–2	St Albans Saints (3)
18	Noble Park United (4)	1–3	Mornington (4)
19	Berwick City (5)	3–2	Western Suburbs (4)
20	Dandenong Thunder (2)	2–1	Heidelberg United (2)
21	Skye United (7)	1–1†	Melbourne University (5)
Skye United advance 4–2 on penalties.
22	Kingston City (3)	0–1†	Moreland Zebras (3)
23	Melbourne Knights (2)	4–0	Whittlesea Ranges (3)
24	Plenty Valley Lions (7)	3–4	Eastern Lions (4)
25	Malvern City (4)	1–2	Sunbury United (4)
26	Fawkner Blues (4)	4–2	Eltham Redbacks (8)
27	Sunshine George Cross (3)	0–1	South Melbourne (2)
28	Cairnlea (4)	5–1	St Kevins Old Boys (8)
29	Green Gully (2)	2–1	Ballarat Red Devils (2)
30	Springvale White Eagles (3)	1–0	Altona Magic (4)
31	Northern Roosters (6)	0–1	Whittlesea United (6)
32	Southern Stars (4)	3–2	Cobram Victory (9)

Notes

- † = After Extra Time

=== Fifth round ===
A total of 32 teams took part in this stage of the competition. Matches in this round were played on 17 April–14 May 2014.

Tie no	Home team (Tier)	Score	Away team (Tier)
1	Avondale Heights (3)	1–2	St Albans Saints (3)
2	South Springvale (4)	3–1	Cairnlea (4)
3	Bulleen Lions (3)	10–0	Westvale (5)
4	Preston Lions (4)	0–5	Werribee City (2)
5	Bentleigh Greens (2)	3–1	Moreland Zebras (3)
6	Dandenong Thunder (2)	3–1	Doveton (5)
7	Frankston Pines (5)	0–4	Green Gully (2)
8	Elwood City (6)	w/o	Northcote City (2)

Tie no	Home team (Tier)	Score	Away team (Tier)
9	Hume City (2)	8–0	Skye United (7)
10	Fawkner Blues (4)	1–0	Beaumaris (5)
11	Richmond (3)	2–1†	North Sunshine Eagles (5)
12	Berwick City (5)	1–4	South Melbourne (2)
13	Melbourne Knights (2)	2–1†	Mornington (4)
14	Southern Stars (4)	1–2†	Sunbury United (4)
15	Keilor Park (4)	0–0†	Eastern Lions (4)
Eastern Lions advance 4–2 on penalties.
16	Whittlesea United (6)	0–4	Springvale White Eagles (3)

Notes

- w/o = Walkover
- † = After Extra Time

=== Sixth round ===
A total of 16 teams took part in this stage of the competition. Matches in this round were played on 28 May–4 June 2014.

Tie no	Home team (Tier)	Score	Away team (Tier)
1	Bulleen Lions (3)	0–1	Bentleigh Greens (2)
2	Dandenong Thunder (2)	0–1†	South Melbourne (2)
3	Fawkner Blues (4)	0–1	South Springvale (4)
4	Green Gully (2)	1–4	Melbourne Knights (2)

Tie no	Home team (Tier)	Score	Away team (Tier)
5	Werribee City (2)	1–2	Northcote City (2)
6	Richmond (3)	4–0	Sunbury United (4)
7	St Albans Saints (3)	4–1	Eastern Lions (4)
8	Springvale White Eagles (3)	0–6	Hume City (2)

Notes

- † = After Extra Time

=== Quarter-finals ===
A total of 8 teams took part in this stage of the competition. The four victorious teams in this round qualified for the 2014 FFA Cup Round of 32 and to the Semi-finals of the 2014 Dockerty Cup. Matches in this round were played on 11–25 June 2014.

Tie no	Home team (Tier)	Score	Away team (Tier)
1	South Melbourne (2)	0–2	Melbourne Knights (2)
2	Hume City (2)	0–3	South Springvale (4)
3	Northcote City (2)	1–1†	St Albans Saints (3)
St Albans Saints advance 6–5 on penalties.
4	Richmond (3)	1–3	Bentleigh Greens (2)

Notes

- † = After Extra Time

== Western Australia ==
Western Australian clubs, other than Perth Glory in the A-League, qualify for the FFA Cup via the Football West State Cup, known this year for sponsorship reasons as the 2014 Cool Ridge Cup. Two places from WA (the semi-final winners) qualified for the FFA Cup 2014 Round of 32.

=== Schedule ===
Federation	Round	Main date	Number of fixtures	Clubs	New entries this round
Western Australia	Qualifying round	29 March 2014	18 + 3 byes	50 → 32	39
Western Australia	Round 1	5 April 2014	16	32 → 16	11
Western Australia	Round 2	21 April 2014	8	16 → 8	none
Western Australia	Quarter-finals	10 May 2014	4	8 → 4	none
Western Australia	Semi-finals	2 June 2014	2	4 → 2	none

=== Qualifying round ===
A total of 39 Western Australian teams took part in this stage of the competition. 24 clubs from the All Flags State League Division 1 and State League Division 2 and 15 clubs from various divisions of the 2014 Sunday League were admitted into the competition at this stage. Matches in this round were played on 29 March 2014.

Tie no	Home team (Tier)	Score	Away team (Tier)
1	Ashfield (3)	5–1	Hamersley Rovers (5)
2	Wanneroo City (3)	3–1	Canning City (3)
3	South Perth United (5)	1–2	Kingsley (5)
4	Queens Park (5)	0–4	Dianella White Eagles (3)
5	Kelmscott Roos (4)	5–7	Curtin University (4)
6	Shamrock Rovers Perth (3)	4–2	Morley-Windmills (3)
7	Quinns (4)	0–2	UWA-Nedlands (3)
8	Forrestfield United (4)	4–2	Balga (4)
9	Mandurah City (3)	4–0	BB United (5)

Tie no	Home team (Tier)	Score	Away team (Tier)
10	Joondalup City (4)	4–0	Ballajura (7)
11	Perth Royals (5)	4–2	Gosnells City (3)
12	Kwinana United (5)	1–10	Joondalup United (4)
13	Port Kennedy (6)	6–0	Ellenbrook United (4)
14	Rockingham City (4)	1–0	Gwelup Croatia (5)
15	Kalamunda United (6)	1–8	Fremantle Croatia (5)
16	Western Knights (3)	2–4	Bunbury Forum Force (3)
17	Southern Spirit (5)	2–3	Olympic Kingsway (4)
18	Melville City (4)	4–2	Whitfords City (5)

Notes

- Byes – North Perth United (5), Swan United (3) and Fremantle United (4).

=== First round ===
A total of 32 teams took part in this stage of the competition. 11 of the 12 Clubs from the National Premier Leagues entered into the competition at this stage, with the exception of Perth Glory Youth who were not eligible. Matches in this round were played on 5 April 2014.

Tie no	Home team (Tier)	Score	Away team (Tier)
1	Joondalup United (4)	3–2	Bunbury Forum Force (3)
2	Kingsley (5)	2–6	Rockingham City (4)
3	Cockburn City (2)	4–0	Wanneroo City (3)
4	Dianella White Eagles (3)	1–3	Armadale (2)
5	Perth (2)	7–2	Port Kennedy (6)
6	ECU Joondalup (2)	3–0	Forrestfield United (4)
7	UWA-Nedlands (3)	1–2	Curtin University (4)
8	Bayswater City (2)	5–0	Ashfield (3)

Tie no	Home team (Tier)	Score	Away team (Tier)
9	Fremantle United (4)	4–2	Olympic Kingsway (4)
10	Joondalup City (4)	0–2	Stirling Lions (2)
11	Floreat Athena (2)	3–1	Perth Royals (5)
12	Fremantle Croatia (5)	1–4	Shamrock Rovers Perth (3)
13	Melville City (4)	0–5	Balcatta (2)
14	Swan United (3)	0–6	Sorrento (2)
15	Subiaco AFC (2)	6–2	Mandurah City (3)
16	North Perth United (5)	1–4	Inglewood United (2)

=== Second round ===
A total of 16 teams took part in this stage of the competition. Matches in this round were played on 21 April 2014.

Tie no	Home team (Tier)	Score	Away team (Tier)
1	Cockburn City (2)	3–1	Perth (2)
2	Floreat Athena (2)	5–0	Sorrento (2)
3	ECU Joondalup (2)	5–2	Shamrock Rovers Perth (3)
4	Bayswater City (2)	3–1	Armadale (2)

Tie no	Home team (Tier)	Score	Away team (Tier)
5	Balcatta (2)	3–1	Joondalup United (4)
6	Inglewood United (2)	4–1	Fremantle United (4)
7	Rockingham City (4)	1–8	Stirling Lions (2)
8	Subiaco AFC (2)	3–0	Curtin University (4)

=== Quarter-finals ===
A total of 8 teams took part in this stage of the competition. Matches in this round were played on 10 May 2014.

Tie no	Home team (Tier)	Score	Away team (Tier)
1	ECU Joondalup (2)	3–1†	Balcatta (2)
2	Inglewood United (2)	2–2†	Bayswater City (2)
Bayswater City advance 5–4 on penalties.
3	Stirling Lions (2)	3–2†	Floreat Athena (2)
4	Subiaco AFC (2)	2–1	Cockburn City (2)

Notes

- † = After Extra Time

=== Semi-finals ===
A total of 4 teams took part in this stage of the competition. The two victorious teams in this round qualified for the 2014 FFA Cup Round of 32, and also for the Cool Ridge Cup Final. Matches in this round were played on 2 June 2014.

Tie no	Home team (Tier)	Score	Away team (Tier)
1	ECU Joondalup (2)	1–3	Stirling Lions (2)
2	Subiaco AFC (2)	0–4	Bayswater City (2)
