= Nassim Courail =

Belgian-Moroccan footballer

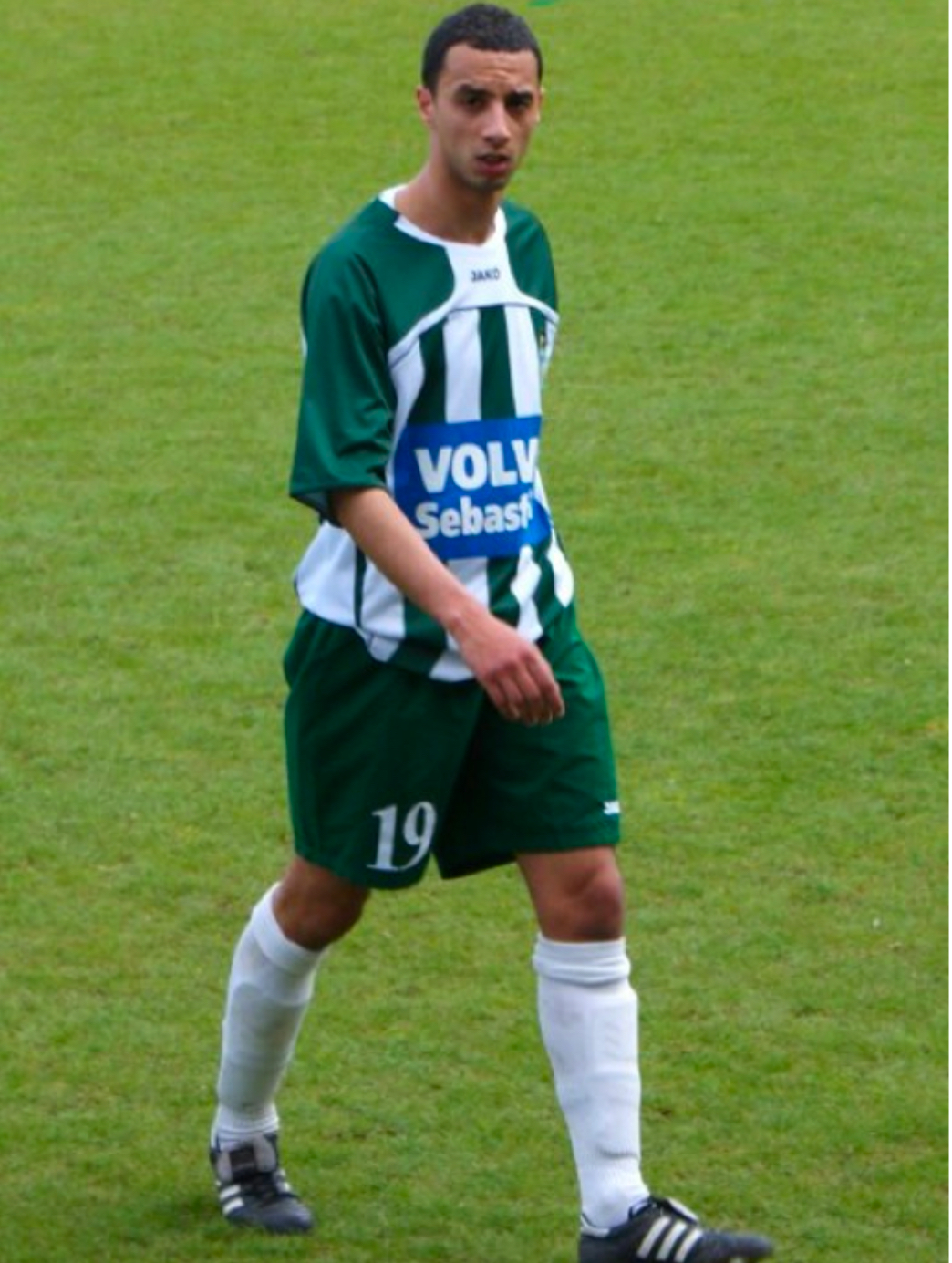
- Courail in 2008

Personal information
- Date of birth: 29 September 1984 (age 42)
- Place of birth: Brussels, Belgium
- Position: Central defender

Team information
- Current team: Springvale White Eagles (assistant coach)

Senior career*
Years	Team	Apps	(Gls)
- Eupen reserves
- RFCU La Calamine
- Lontzen
2009–?	RFC Seraing		
2012	Heidelberg United		
2013	Oakleigh Cannons		
2015	South Springvale SC		
2023	Springvale White Eagles		
- * Club domestic league appearances and goals

Nassim Courail (born 29 September 1984) is a Belgian-Moroccan football coach and former player who serves as an assistant coach at Springvale White Eagles.

== Playing career ==
Courail was born in Brussels, Belgium. A central defender, he began his career playing in the Belgian national divisions with the K.A.S Eupen reserves, with RFCU La Calamine, with Lontzen, and with RFC Seraing (1922) before continuing his career in Australia where he played for Heidelberg United and Oakleigh Cannons.

In 2014, he joined South Springvale SC, contributing to their historic run as the first Victorian club to qualify for the inaugural FFA Cup round of 32.

He then joined Springvale White Eagles in 2023.

== Coaching career ==
In 2024, Courail began his transition into coaching, taking on the role of assistant coach at Springvale White Eagles. That same year, he helped lead the team to a Division 4 Championship title in Australia.
