= 2010 Waratah Cup =

McDonald's Cup
- (Waratah)

Tournament details
- Country: Australia (NSW)
- Teams: 100 +

Final positions
- Champions: Marconi Stallions
- Runners-up: Spirit FC

Tournament statistics
- Matches played: 79
- Goals scored: 313 (3.96 per match)

The 2010 Waratah Cup (known as the 2010 McDonald's Cup for sponsorship reasons) was the seventh edition of the association football knockout competition since its re-introduction in 2004 and the 30th all-time premier state cup since inauguration in 1957.

The competition featured clubs from all parts of NSW - from Association, NSW State League Division One, NSW State League Division Two, NSW Super League and NSW Premier League competitions.

The winners were Marconi Stallions, their first title.

== Preliminary round ==
Three matches kick started the 2010 McDonald's Cup campaign on Wednesday 31 March after as many as seven games were cancelled due to wet weather conditions that gripped Sydney. In the three matches St George Association based Sans Souci defeated Eastern Suburbs based Association side Pagewood Botany 2–1 in what was a fiercely contested match. State League Two new boys Belmore Hercules had their work cut out but managed to defeat Bankstown Association's Bankstown Sports Strikers 2–1 at Crest while at Seymour Shaw State League Two side Fairfield Wanderers easily disposed of Sutherland Association's Bangor Junior 5–0. Daniel Gonzalez was the hero for the Wanderers after hitting a first half hat-trick while there were also goals from Sanchez and Olvarez.

Tie no	Home team	Score	Away team
1	Collaroy Cromer	2–0	West Pymble
2	Mosman FC	4–1	Northside Monash
3	Lidcombe Waratahs	1–2	Dee Why FC
4	Pacific Hills Dural FC	1–2	St. Josephs Rydalmere
5	Auburn Sports FC	2–0	Yagoona Lions

== First round ==
Tie no	Home team	Score	Away team
1	Roosters FC	4–3	Kirrawee Football Club
2	Sans Souci	2–1	Sydney Hakoah
3	Prospect FC	6–1	Granville Waratahs
4	Seaforth Football Club	4–1	Fairfield Bulls
5	Riverstone Schofields	1–2	Ariana Football Club
6	Lokomotiv Cove FC	3–0	Fairfield Wanderers
7	Gymea United	1–3	Dandaloo Sports
8	Luddenham United	3–2	Gazy Lansvale
9	Doonside Hawks	2–1	Toongabbie FC
10	Baulkham Hills	0–1	Gwawley Bay
11	Hurstville City Minotaurs	0–2	Buli FC
12	Collaroy Cromer	3–2	Dunbar Rovers
13	Hawkesbury City SC	2–1	Auburn Wednesday
14	Mosman FC	4–3	Coogee United Wednesday
15	Springwood FC	2–0	St. Josephs Rydlemere
16	Dee Why FC	2 – 2 (2–4 pens)	Belmore Hercules

== Second round ==
Tie no	Home team	Score	Away team
1	Mounties Wanderers	1–0	Luddenham FC
2	Spirit FC	6–0	Hurstville ZFC
3	Parramatta Eagles	4–1	Balmain SC
4	Lokomotiv Cove FC	0–2	Sydney University
5	Macarthur Rams	3 – 3 (1–4) pens	Fairfield City Lions
6	Sans Souci FC	1–6	Inter Lions
7	Collaroy Cromer	4–2	Central Coast Lightning
8	Granville Rage	2–1	UNSW
9	Hawkesbury City	1 – 1 (3–1) pens	Seaforth FC
10	Gwawley Bay	1 – 1 (3–2) pens	Dulwich Hill FC
11	Bulli FC	2–3	Northern Tigers FC
12	Mt Druitt Town Rangers	0–5	Mosman FC
13	Doonside Hawks	3–0	Ariana Football Club
14	Prospect FC	0–2	Camden Tigers FC
15	Hills Brumbies	3–1	FC Bossy Liverpool
16	Fraser Park FC	1–2	Stanmore Hawks
17	St. George FC	2–1	Gladesville Ryde Magic
18	Schofield Scorpions FC	3–2	Belmore Hercules
19	Roosters FC	1–4	Dandaloo FC
20	Blacktown Spartans	3–0	Springwood FC

== Third round ==
Tie no	Home team	Score	Away team
1	Mounties Wanderers	1–7	Sydney University FC
2	Spirit FC	2–0	Camden Tigers
3	Parramatta Eagles	1–2	Fairfield City Lions
4	Manly United FC	5–1	Collaroy Cromer Strikers
5	Blacktown City FC	7–0	Stanmore Hawks
6	Marconi Stallions	1–0	West Sydney Berries
7	Granville Rage	3–0	Sydney Olympic
8	Hawkesbury City	0–4	Northern Tigers FC
9	Mosman FC	1 –3	APIA Leichhardt Tigers
10	Doonside Hawks	1–4	Gwawley Bay
11	Sydney United	1 – 1 (4–2) pens	Inter Lions
12	Bonnyrigg White Eagles	1–2	South Coast Wolves
13	St. George FC	0–1	Sutherland Sharks
14	Bankstown City Lions	8–0	Schofields Scorpions
15	Dandaloo FC	4–1	Hills Brumbies
16	Blacktown Spartans	1–0	Rockdale City Suns

== Fourth round ==
Tie no	Home team	Score	Away team
1	Granville Rage	3–2	Northern Tigers FC
2	Fairfield City Lions	1–4	Manly United
3	Sydney University FC	0–2	Blacktown City FC
4	APIA Leichhardt Tigers	2–3	Marconi Stallions
5	Sutherland Sharks	4–1	Dandaloo FC
6	Blacktown Spartans	4–3	Sydney United
7	Bankstown City Lions	0–1	South Coast Wolves
8	Spirit FC	4–0	Gwawley Bay

== Quarter finals ==
Five of the quarter finalists were from the New South Wales Premier League, 2 teams from the NSW Super League and 1 team from NSW State League Division One. All games were played on 9 June 2010.

9 June 2010

Spirit FC	2–0	South Coast Wolves
Daniel Cunningham 14' (pen.); Ben Gough 59'	Report

Christie Park
Attendance: 50
Referee: Kevin Peddie

9 June 2010

Manly United	2–3	Marconi Stallions
Chris Payne 24', 47'	Report	Alex Canak 8'; Laurence Braude 18'; Nahuel Arrarte 81'

Cromer Park
Referee: Ryan Shepheard

9 June 2010

Sutherland Sharks	0–2	Blacktown City
	Report	Tolgay Ozbey 18', 45' (pen.)

Seymour Shaw Park
Referee: Kurt Ahms

9 June 2010

Granville Rage	1–3	Blacktown Spartans FC
Pat Cappuccio 50' (pen.)	Report	Reece Iredale 3'; Glenn McPherson 71', 78'

Garside Park
Attendance: 100
Referee: Andrew Best

== Semi finals ==
22 June 2010

Blacktown City FC	2 – 3 (aet)	Spirit FC
Ozbey 10'; Chianese 29'		Peatey 7'; Papanicolaou 70'; Nicoloau 116'

Lily Homes Stadium
Attendance: 100
Referee: Andrew Best

23 June 2010

Blacktown Spartans FC	1 – 2 (aet)	Marconi Stallions
McPherson 95'		Mallia 93'; Canak 120'

Francis Park
Referee: Kevin Peddie

== Final ==
Sunday, 11 July 2010

Spirit FC	0–0	Marconi Stallions
	Report
Penalties
Daniel Cunningham (penalty scored); Tim Simpson (penalty scored); Evan Daglis (penalty scored); Josh De Kelly (penalty missed); Paul Nicolaou (penalty scored); Leo Papnicolaou (penalty scored); Brendan Griffin (penalty scored); Tom Lovell (penalty missed)	6–7	(penalty scored) Umut Tokdogan; (penalty scored) Sean O'Connell; (penalty missed) Aleksander Canak; (penalty scored) Abel Eljamal; (penalty scored) Nahuel Arrarte; (penalty scored) Erick Anabalon; (penalty scored) Jose Bello Amigo; (penalty scored) Christopher Nunes

Lily Homes Stadium, Seven Hills
Attendance: c. 300
Referee: Kris Griffiths-Jones

1	(Australia) Murray Nelson
2	(Australia) Daniel Cunningham
4	(Australia) Paul Nicolaou (c)
6	(Australia) Matt Peatey
7	(Australia) Ben Gough	(substituted off) 97'
8	(Australia) Josh De Kelly	(substituted off) 61'
10	(Australia) Leonardo Pananicolaou
11	(Australia) Brendan Griffin
16	(Australia) Tom Lovell
18	(Australia) Adam Peatey	(substituted off) 85'
20	(Australia) Scott Wright
Substitutes:
3	(Australia) Lachlan Harte
9	(Australia) Tim Simpson	(substituted on) 97'
15	(Australia) Akwasi Agyei	(substituted on) 61'
17	(Australia) Evan Daglis	(substituted on) 85'
41	(Australia) James Irwin
Coach:
(Australia) Tony Walmsley

21	(Spain) Jose Bello Amigo	(yellow card) 120'
4	(Australia) Umat Tokdogan
5	(Australia) Adel Eljamal
8	(Australia) Aleksander Canak	(yellow card) 118'
9	(Australia) Erick Anabalon	(yellow card) 98'
11	(Australia) Matthew Gordon (c)		(substituted off) 68'
18	(Australia) Jared Lum		(substituted off) 79'
23	(Australia) Christopher Nunes
26	(Australia) Nahuel Arrarte
31	(Australia) Mitchell Mallia	(yellow card) 12'	(substituted off) 105'
42	(Australia) Giorgio Speranza
Substitutes:
10	(Australia) Graziano Trimboli		(substituted on) 105'
22	(Australia) James Chronopolous
32	(Australia) Anthony Avati
34	(Australia) Nathan Jagelman		(substituted on) 79'
39	(Australia) Sean O'Connell		(substituted on) 68'
Coach:
(Australia) Lee Sterrey

Player of the Match:
Jose Bello Amigo (Marconi Stallions)
Assistant referees:
Adam Gilbert and Steven Nguyen
Fourth official:
Kevin Peddie

Match rules

- 90 minutes
- 30 minutes of extra time if necessary.
- Penalty shoot-out if scores still level.

NSW Waratah State Cup
2010 Champions

Marconi Stallions FC
First Title

=== Statistics ===
	Spirit FC	Marconi Sallions
Attempts at goal	9	9
Attempts on target	6	4
Corners	1	5
Fouls committed	14	18
Offsides	2	0
Yellow cards	0	3
Red cards	0	0
