= Harry Pettit =

British social geographer and political activist (born 1991)

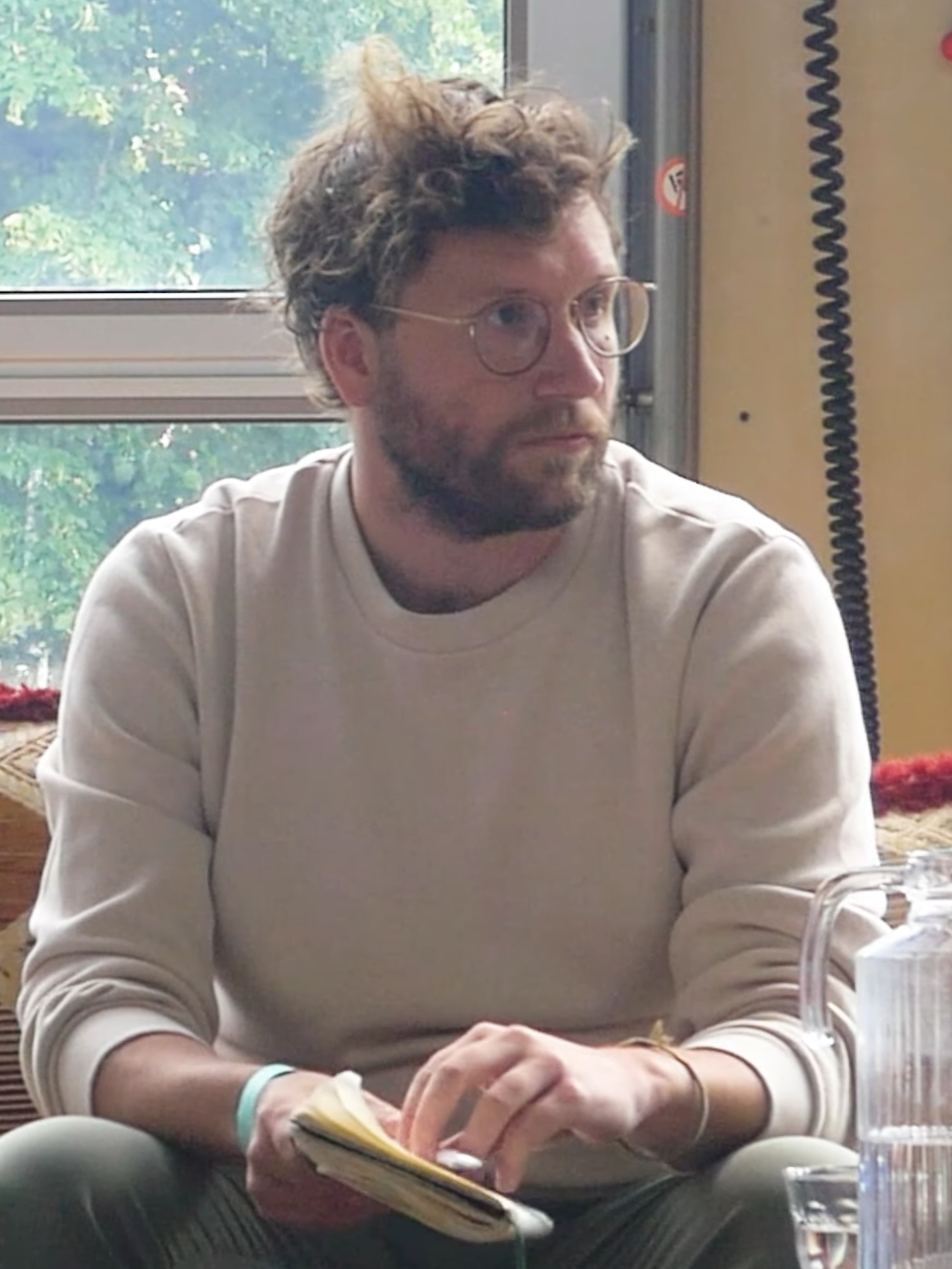
- Harry Pettit (2024)
- Born: Harry George Pettit; 1991 (age 34–35); Retford, United Kingdom
- Citizenship: United Kingdom
- Education: London School of Economics (BSc, PhD)
- Scientific career
- Fields: Social geography
- Workplaces: Radboud University (2022-25)

Harry George Pettit (born 1991) is a British political activist and a social geographer. As a geographer, he specializes in urban geography, social geography, and the dynamics of job insecurity in Egypt.

During his tenure as a lecturer at Radboud University in Nijmegen, Pettit came to public attention several times due to his controversial public statements regarding the Israeli–Palestinian conflict. These statements, which resulted in his leaving Radboud University, sparked debates in the Netherlands concerning academic freedom, freedom of expression, hate speech and antisemitism.

== Early life and education ==
Harry Pettit was born and grew up in Retford, United Kingdom, and obtained his PhD in geography at the London School of Economics and Political Science in 2017.

== Academic career and activism ==
Pettit held several short-term research and teaching positions at universities across the United Kingdom. In 2022, he served as a visiting researcher at the University of Amsterdam.

=== Radboud University ===
In 2023, Pettit was appointed assistant professor of social geography at Radboud University Nijmegen.

Pettit became involved in several controversies while at Radboud due to his outspoken pro-Palestinian positions on social media, particularly following the October 7 attacks. He was accused of antisemitism, glorification of violence, and incitement. The statements by Petit became a subject of debate among Dutch politicians, and in October 2025, a petition calling on Radboud University to take action against Pettit received more than 12,000 signatures within a few days. Around the same time, 113 (former) students, professors, lecturers, and staff members of the university urged the institution to act, while Minister of Education Gouke Moes advised the university to file a formal complaint against Pettit. Pettit in turn filed a complaint against Moes, stating that he “would not accept political repression in the service of Zionism.”

On 10 November 2025, Pettit announced on social media that he had reached an agreement with Radboud University to depart and claimed to have secured a new position elsewhere. The university confirmed his departure, stating that, after “an intensive process lasting several months,” both parties had “agreed to part ways” and that Pettit had made “statements inconsistent with the university's code of conduct.”

=== After Radboud ===
In early March 2026, Vrije Universiteit Brussel withdrew an offer of employment to Pettit following anti-Zionist and anti-US statements made on social media during the 2026 Iran war. The same month, members of the European Parliament objected to Pettit's research grant by the European Union.

== Publications ==
- Pettit, Harry (June 2014). "Book Review - Cities Without Suburbs: A Census 2010 Perspective, 4th Edition". European Planning Studies. 22 (9). Routledge: 1989–1991. doi:10.1080/09654313.2014.924219.
- Pettit, Harry (2015). ""Iftar" in Mcdonald's: the Everyday Encroachment of Cairo's Subaltern Cosmopolitans". In Gerges, Fawaz A. (ed.). Contentious Politics in the Middle East: Popular Resistance and Marginalized Activism beyond the Arab Uprisings. New York: Palgrave Macmillan. pp. 523–546. ISBN 978-1-137-53721-8.
- Pettit, Harry (November 2018). "Hopeful City: Meritocracy and Affect in Global Cairo". International Journal of Urban and Regional Research. 42 (6). Wiley-Blackwell: 1048–1063. doi:10.1111/1468-2427.12695.
- Pettit, Harry; Ruijtenberg, Wiebe (June 2019). "Migration as hope and depression: existential im/mobilities in and beyond Egypt". Mobilities. 14 (5). Routledge: 730–744. doi:10.1080/17450101.2019.1609193.
- Pettit, Harry (August 2019). "The cruelty of hope: Emotional cultures of precarity in neoliberal Cairo". Environment and Planning D: Society and Space. 37 (4). Sage Publishing: 722–739. Bibcode:2019EnPlD..37..722P. doi:10.1177/0263775818825264.
- Pettit, Harry (August 2020). "Uncomfortable ethnography: Navigating friendship and 'cruel hope' with Egypt's disconnected middle-class". Emotion, Space and Society. 36 (3) 100714. Elsevier. doi:10.1016/j.emospa.2020.100714.
- Pettit, Harry (October 2021). "Introduction: Hope, labour, disconnection". Environment and Planning D: Society and Space. 39 (5). Sage Publishing: 779–791. doi:10.1177/026377582110408 (inactive 6 August 2026).
- Pettit, Harry (2023). The Labor of Hope: Meritocracy and Precarity in Egypt. Stanford University Press. ISBN 978-1-5036-3653-8.
