= José Bello Amigo =

Spanish footballer

Personal information
- Full name: José Fernando Bello Amigo Serans
- Date of birth: 5 November 1978 (age 47)
- Place of birth: Ribeira, Spain
- Height: 1.82 m (6 ft 0 in)
- Position: Goalkeeper

Team information
- Current team: Philippines U17 (women) (goalkeeping coach)

Youth career
- 1996: St. George

Senior career*
| Years | Team | Apps | (Gls) |
| 1997 | St. George | 11 | (0) |
| 1998 | Leichhardt Tigers | | |
| 2000–2001 | Canterbury-Marrickville | | |
| 2001–2005 | Racing Ferrol | 113 | (0) |
| 2005–2008 | Poli Ejido | 37 | (0) |
| 2008–2009 | Jerez Industrial | 25 | (0) |
| 2010 | Marconi Stallions | | |
| 2011–2012 | Leichhardt Tigers | | |
- * Club domestic league appearances and goals

José Fernando Bello Amigo Serans (born 5 November 1978) is a Spanish-Australian retired footballer who played as a goalkeeper. He currently serves as the goalkeeping coach for the Philippines women's national under-17 team.

== Early life ==
Bello Amigo was born on 5 November 1978 in Ribeira, Spain. he moved with his family to Australia at the age of five.

== Football career ==
Bello Amigo began his career in Australia at St. George Saints Football Club, and was transferred in 1998 to the APIA Leichhardt Tigers FC. Two years later, he moved to Canterbury-Marrickville.

From 2001 to 2008, Bello Amigo played in Spain, mainly in its second division, with Racing de Ferrol (four seasons, promoting in 2004 from the third level) and Polideportivo Ejido (three). After the Andalusians dropped down a tier at the end of the 2007–08 campaign, he joined neighbours Jerez Industrial CF and competed in division four.

After contributing to Jerez's promotion, Bello Amigo was released. A few months after he returned to his country of adoption, signing with the Marconi Stallions FC.

Bello Amigo returned to the Leichhardt Tigers, for the 2011 NSW Premier League season.

== Personal life ==
Bello Amigo's father is a former professional footballer. He too played for Racing Ferrol, before emigrating to Australia. After retiring from professional football, he lived in Sydney, Australia.
