= 2014 FFA Cup =

2014 season of Australia's national knockout soccer competition

Tournament details
- Country: Australia; New Zealand
- Teams: 631

Final positions
- Champions: Adelaide United (1st title)
- Runners-up: Perth Glory

Tournament statistics
- Matches played: 31
- Goals scored: 94 (3.03 per match)
- Attendance: 93,820 (3,026 per match)
- Top goal scorer: Sergio Cirio (6 goals)

The 2014 FFA Cup was the inaugural season of the FFA Cup (now known as the Australia Cup), the main national soccer knockout cup competition in Australia. 631 teams in total from around Australia entered the competition. Only 32 teams competed in the competition proper (round of 32), including the 10 A-League teams and 22 Football Federation Australia (FFA) member federation teams determined through individual state-based preliminary rounds held in early 2014 (and 2013 in the case of the ACT). The FFA Cup competition proper commenced on 29 July 2014 and concluded with the FFA Cup Final on 16 December 2014.

The final was brought forward from Australia Day in order to avoid a clash with the 2015 Asian Cup, which was hosted by Australia.

The winner of the FFA Cup received $50,000 as part of a total prize money pool of $131,450.

== Round and dates ==
Round	Draw date	Match dates	Number of fixtures	Teams	New entries this round
Preliminary rounds	Various	6 April 2013 – 25 June 2014	616 + 34 byes	631 → 32	621
Round of 32	27 June 2014	29 July–20 August 2014	16	32 → 16	10
Round of 16	22 August 2014	16–23 September 2014	8	16 → 8	none
Quarter-finals	23 September 2014	14–29 October 2014	4	8 → 4	none
Semi-finals	31 October 2014	11–12 November 2014	2	4 → 2	none
Final	12 November 2014	16 December 2014	1	2 → 1	none

== Prize fund ==
Round	No. of Clubs receive fund	Prize fund
Round of 16	8	$1,800
Quarter-finalists	4	$4,800
Semi-finalists	2	$10,950
Final runners-up	1	$25,950
Final winner	1	$50,000
Total		$131,450

== Preliminary rounds ==
621 FFA member federations teams competed in various state-based preliminary rounds to win one of 22 places in the competition proper (round of 32). Eight of the nine FFA member federations took part in the tournament, the exception being Northern Territory, whose participation commenced in 2015. Player registration numbers in each jurisdiction was used to determine the number of qualifying teams for each member federation:

- NSW have seven teams qualify.
- Queensland have four teams qualify.
- Victoria have four teams qualify.
- Northern NSW have two teams qualify.
- Western Australia have two teams qualify.
- ACT have one team qualify.
- South Australia have one team qualify.
- Tasmania have one team qualify.

The first of the preliminary rounds began on 6 April 2013 and the final of the preliminary rounds took place on 25 June 2014. Seven of the eight member federation preliminary rounds took place in 2014 (16 February–25 June). The exception was the ACT, whose competition took place during 2013 (6 April–28 August).

== Teams ==
A total of 32 teams participated in the 2014 FFA Cup competition proper, ten of which came from the A-League, the remaining 22 teams from FFA member federations, as determined by the preliminary rounds. A-League clubs represent the highest level in the Australian league system, where as member federation clubs come from Level 2 and below. The current season tier of member federation clubs is shown in parentheses.

A-League clubs
Adelaide United	Brisbane Roar	Central Coast Mariners	Melbourne City
Melbourne Victory	Newcastle Jets	Perth Glory	Sydney FC
Wellington Phoenix	Western Sydney Wanderers		
Member federation clubs
(Australian Capital Territory) Tuggeranong United (2)	(New South Wales) Blacktown City (2)	(New South Wales) Manly United (2)	(New South Wales) South Coast Wolves (2)
(New South Wales) Sydney Olympic (2)	(New South Wales) Sydney United 58 (2)	(New South Wales) Parramatta FC (3)	(New South Wales) Hakoah Sydney City East (4)
(New South Wales) Broadmeadow Magic (2)	(New South Wales) South Cardiff (2)	(Queensland) Brisbane Strikers (2)	Far North Queensland (2)
(Queensland) Olympic FC (2)	(Queensland) Palm Beach (2)	(South Australia) Adelaide City (2)	(Tasmania) South Hobart (2)
(Victoria (state)) Bentleigh Greens (2)	(Victoria (state)) Melbourne Knights (2)	(Victoria (state)) South Springvale (4)	(Victoria (state)) St Albans Saints (3)
(Western Australia) Bayswater City (2)	(Western Australia) Stirling Lions (2)		

== Draw ==
After the completion of the 2013–14 A-League season and the preliminary rounds by the respective member federations, the 32 teams were organised for the FFA Cup Round of 32 draw, the first of four draws in the competition proper. The draw for the round of 32 used three pots to arrange the teams: Pot A included the four A-League teams to reach the semi-finals in the 2013–14 A-League Finals series (Brisbane Roar, Central Coast Mariners, Melbourne Victory and Western Sydney Wanderers), Pot B included the remaining six A-League teams and Pot C contained the 22 member federation teams. Teams were drawn randomly into predetermined positions. From the round of 16, Quarter-finals and Semi-finals, teams will be allocated in one of two pots. The remaining A-League teams were allocated to Pot A and the remaining member federation teams into Pot B. In each draw, teams were again drawn randomly into predetermined positions.

The positions into which teams were drawn into were structured to ensure that member federation teams have the best chance of advancing in the competition. The draw ensuresd a minimum of one non-A-League team reached the Semi-finals stage, a minimum of three in the Quarter-finals and a minimum of nine in the round of 16. This structure was achieved by allocating randomly drawn teams into predetermined positions, with some A-League teams guaranteed to be drawn against one another.

The draw for each round did not take place until after the scheduled completion of the previous round. Each draw also determined which teams will play at home; that is, if a member federation team drew an A-League team, the member federation team would host the fixture. However, where two A-League teams or two member federation teams were drawn together, the first team drawn would be the host, with the exception that Wellington Phoenix was required to play all of their matches in Australia, away from home.

== Bracket ==
Round of 32
Sydney United 58	4
Far North Queensland	1
Melbourne City	1
Sydney FC (a.e.t.)	3
Adelaide United	1
Wellington Phoenix	0
Stirling Lions	0
Brisbane Roar	4
Hakoah Sydney City East	1
Palm Beach	2
South Springvale (pen.)	2 (4)
South Cardiff	2 (3)
Olympic FC	3
Melbourne Knights	1
South Coast Wolves	0
Central Coast Mariners	1
Manly United	1
Sydney Olympic	3
Blacktown City	0
Bentleigh Greens	1
Adelaide City	1
Western Sydney Wanderers	0
Broadmeadow Magic	1
Brisbane Strikers (a.e.t.)	2
Parramatta FC	0
St Albans Saints	1
Newcastle Jets	0
Perth Glory	2
South Hobart	1 (4)
Tuggeranong United (pen.)	1 (5)
Bayswater City	0
Melbourne Victory	2

Round of 16
Sydney United 58	1
Sydney FC	3
Adelaide United	2
Brisbane Roar	0
Palm Beach	1
South Springvale	0
Olympic FC	1
Central Coast Mariners	3
Sydney Olympic	1
Bentleigh Greens	2
Adelaide City	1
Brisbane Strikers	0
St Albans Saints	1
Perth Glory	4
Tuggeranong United	0
Melbourne Victory	6

Quarter-finals
Sydney FC	1
Adelaide United (a.e.t.)	3
Palm Beach	0
Central Coast Mariners	5
Bentleigh Greens (a.e.t.)	2
Adelaide City	1
Perth Glory (a.e.t.)	4
Melbourne Victory	2

Semi-finals
Adelaide United	3
Central Coast Mariners	2
Bentleigh Greens	0
Perth Glory	3

Final
Adelaide United	1
Perth Glory	0

== Round of 32 ==
The lowest ranked sides that qualified for this round were Hakoah Sydney City East and South Springvale. They were the only level 4 teams left in the competition.

All times listed below are at AEST

29 July 2014	Broadmeadow Magic (2)	1–2 (a.e.t.)	Brisbane Strikers (2)	Wanderers Oval, Newcastle
19:30	Petitt 58'	Report	Thurtell 60'; Coulson 103'	Attendance: 1,523; Referee: Tim McGilchrist

29 July 2014	Manly United (2)	1–3	Sydney Olympic (2)	Cromer Park, Sydney
19:30	Payne 10'	Report	M. Gaitatzis 58', 76'; H. Gaitatzis 74'	Attendance: 1,800; Referee: Stephen Lucas

29 July 2014	Olympic FC (2)	3–1	Melbourne Knights (2)	Goodwin Park, Brisbane
19:30	McLean 17', 25'; Jafari 86'	Report	O'Doherty 52'	Attendance: 2,195; Referee: Alex King

29 July 2014	South Springvale (4)	2–2 (a.e.t.) (4–3 p)	South Cardiff (2)	Kingston Heath Soccer Complex, Melbourne
19:30	Florea 25'; Dimitrakopoulos 78'	Report	Ashton 4'; Wallace 41'	Attendance: 1,420; Referee: Alex Azcurra
	Penalties
	Diaco (penalty scored); Drakos (penalty scored); K. Fitzgerald (penalty scored); Skledar (penalty scored)		(penalty scored) D. Johnson; (penalty missed) Gazzard; (penalty scored) Brynes; (penalty scored) Stevens; (penalty missed) J. Johnson

5 August 2014	Newcastle Jets (1)	0–2	Perth Glory (1)	Wanderers Oval, Newcastle
19:30		Report	Keogh 20', 88'	Attendance: 2,877; Referee: Kris Griffiths-Jones

5 August 2014	Parramatta FC (3)	0–1	St Albans Saints (3)	Melita Stadium, Sydney
19:30		Report	Devlin 34'	Attendance: 780; Referee: Chris Young

5 August 2014	South Hobart (2)	1–1 (a.e.t.) (4–5 p)	Tuggeranong United (2)	KGV Park, Hobart
19:30	Kiddey 69' (o.g.)	Report	Z. Munster 85'	Attendance: 1,472; Referee: Patrick Chaplin
	Penalties
	Ludford (penalty scored); Undy (penalty missed); Mann (penalty scored); Scott (penalty scored); Brennan (penalty scored); Ludlow (penalty missed)		(penalty scored) Stewart; (penalty scored) Z. Munster; (penalty missed) E. Munster; (penalty scored) Reis; (penalty scored) Menser; (penalty scored) Pettit

5 August 2014	Adelaide United (1)	1–0	Wellington Phoenix (1)	Marden Sports Complex, Adelaide
20:00	Cirio 31'	Report		Attendance: 2,804; Referee: Shaun Evans

12 August 2014	Blacktown City (2)	0–1	Bentleigh Greens (2)	Lily Homes Stadium, Sydney
19:30		Report	Stirton 40'	Attendance: 624; Referee: Stephen Lucas

12 August 2014	Melbourne City (1)	1–3 (a.e.t.)	Sydney FC (1)	Morshead Park Stadium, Ballarat
19:30	Kalmar 64'	Report	Gameiro 23'; Abbas 111' (pen.), 115' (pen.)	Attendance: 2,801; Referee: Shaun Evans

12 August 2014	Sydney United 58 (2)	4–1	Far North Queensland (2)	Sydney United Sports Centre, Sydney
19:30	Tomelic 14'; Mileski 60'; Pavlović 71', 78'	Report	Smith 90'	Attendance: 750; Referee: Jonathan Barreiro

12 August 2014	Adelaide City (2)	1–0	Western Sydney Wanderers (1)	Marden Sports Complex, Adelaide
20:00	Love 75'	Report		Attendance: 2,701; Referee: Alan Milliner

19 August 2014	Hakoah Sydney City East (4)	1–2	Palm Beach (2)	Hensley Athletic Field, Sydney
19:30	Owusu 68'	Report	Dragicevic 4'; Rees 17'	Attendance: 1,158; Referee: Matthew Cropper

19 August 2014	Stirling Lions (2)	0–4	Brisbane Roar (1)	Western Australian Athletics Stadium, Perth
21:30		Report	Henrique 30'; Brown 55'; Smith 63'; Solórzano 68'	Attendance: 1,152; Referee: Lucien Laverdure

20 August 2014	South Coast Wolves (2)	0–1	Central Coast Mariners (1)	WIN Stadium, Wollongong
19:30		Report	Trifiro 13'	Attendance: 5,238; Referee: Ben Williams

20 August 2014	Bayswater City (2)	0–2	Melbourne Victory (1)	Western Australian Athletics Stadium, Perth
21:30		Report	Barbarouses 23'; Thompson 77'	Attendance: 1,650; Referee: Kris Griffiths-Jones

== Round of 16 ==
The lowest ranked side that qualified for this round was South Springvale. They were the only level 4 team left in the competition.

All times listed below are at AEST

16 September 2014	Adelaide City (2)	1–0	Brisbane Strikers (2)	Marden Sports Complex, Adelaide
19:30	Costa 42'	Report		Attendance: 2,024; Referee: Rick Schneider

16 September 2014	Olympic FC (2)	1–3	Central Coast Mariners (1)	QSAC, Brisbane
19:30	McLean 57'	Report	N. Fitzgerald 2'; Sim 38'; Trifiro 86'	Attendance: 1,374; Referee: Chris Beath

16 September 2014	Sydney Olympic (2)	1–2	Bentleigh Greens (2)	Lambert Park, Sydney
19:30	Soeda 90+4'	Report	McCormick 7' (pen.); De Vries 11'	Attendance: 827; Referee: Strebre Delovski

16 September 2014	Tuggeranong United (2)	0–6	Melbourne Victory (1)	Viking Park, Canberra
19:30		Report	Berisha 11', 21', 86'; Delpierre 14'; Finkler 52'; Pain 57'	Attendance: 5,150; Referee: Ben Williams

23 September 2014	Adelaide United (1)	2–0	Brisbane Roar (1)	Coopers Stadium, Adelaide
19:30	Djite 35'; Cirio 47'	Report		Attendance: 4,053; Referee: Shaun Evans

23 September 2014	Palm Beach (2)	1–0	South Springvale (4)	Cbus Super Stadium, Gold Coast
19:30	Boxell 81'	Report		Attendance: 2,370; Referee: Alan Milliner

23 September 2014	St Albans Saints (3)	1–4	Perth Glory (1)	Knights Stadium, Melbourne
19:30	McGuffie 68' (pen.)	Report	Marinković 37', 90+4'; Maclaren 62'; Keogh 72'	Attendance: 3,500; Referee: Lucien Laverdure

23 September 2014	Sydney United 58 (2)	1–3	Sydney FC (1)	Sydney United Sports Centre, Sydney
19:30	Paric 45'	Report	Naumoff 23', 60'; Abbas 90+1'	Attendance: 8,125; Referee: Kris Griffiths-Jones

== Quarter-finals ==
The lowest ranked sides that qualified for this round were Adelaide City, Bentleigh Greens and Palm Beach. They were the only level 2 teams left in the competition.

All times listed below are at AEDT

14 October 2014	Palm Beach (2)	0–5	Central Coast Mariners (1)	Cbus Super Stadium, Gold Coast
19:30		Report	Cernak 28'; Sim 72', 75', 90', 90+2'	Attendance: 2,035; Referee: Jarred Gillett

21 October 2014	Sydney FC (1)	1–3 (a.e.t.)	Adelaide United (1)	Allianz Stadium, Sydney
19:30	Brosque 51'	Report	Cirio 28'; Djite 99', 111'	Attendance: 3,536; Referee: Ben Williams

29 October 2014	Bentleigh Greens (2)	2–1 (a.e.t.)	Adelaide City (2)	Kingston Heath Soccer Complex, Melbourne
19:30	Wallace 88'; De Abreu 104'	Report	Rideout 48'	Attendance: 1,992; Referee: Lucien Laverdure

29 October 2014	Perth Glory (1)	4–2 (a.e.t.)	Melbourne Victory (1)	nib Stadium, Perth
22:00	Keogh 15' (pen.), 82'; De Silva 103'; Marinković 111'	Report	Ben Khalfallah 8'; Finkler 90+2'	Attendance: 3,899; Referee: Alan Milliner

== Semi-finals ==
The lowest ranked side that qualified for this round was Bentleigh Greens. They were the only level 2 team left in the competition.

All times listed below are at AEDT

11 November 2014	Bentleigh Greens (2)	0–3	Perth Glory (1)	Kingston Heath Soccer Complex, Melbourne
19:30		Report	Marinković 29', 50'; Harold 84'	Attendance: 3,300; Referee: Kris Griffiths-Jones

12 November 2014	Adelaide United (1)	3–2	Central Coast Mariners (1)	Coopers Stadium, Adelaide
19:30	Cirio 39', 88'; Mabil 44'	Report	Simon 48'; J. Rose 90+3'	Attendance: 4,548; Referee: Chris Beath

== Final ==
16 December 2014
19:30 AEDT

Adelaide United (1)	1–0	Perth Glory (1)
Cirio 67'	Report

Coopers Stadium, Adelaide
Attendance: 16,142
Referee: Chris Beath

== Top goalscorers ==
Rank	Player	Club	Goals
1	(Spain) Sergio Cirio	Adelaide United	6
2	(Republic of Ireland) Andy Keogh	Perth Glory	5
2	(Serbia) Nebojša Marinković	Perth Glory	5
2	(Australia) Matt Sim	Central Coast Mariners	5
5	(Iraq) Ali Abbas	Sydney FC	3
5	(Albania) Besart Berisha	Melbourne Victory	3
5	(Australia) Bruce Djite	Adelaide United	3
5	(Australia) Jake McLean	Olympic FC	3
9	(Brazil) Guilherme Finkler	Melbourne Victory	2
9	(Australia) Michael Gaitatzis	Sydney Olympic	2
9	(Australia) Chris Naumoff	Sydney FC	2
9	(Australia) Mirjan Pavlović	Sydney United 58	2
9	(Australia) Glen Trifiro	Central Coast Mariners	2

Notes

- Goals scored in preliminary rounds not included.

== Broadcasting rights ==
The live television rights for the competition were held by the subscription channel Fox Sports, who broadcast ten games live, including all games from the quarter-final stage onwards.

== Match ball ==
The official match ball for the 2014 competition was the Umbro Neo 150 Elite.
