= South Springvale SC =

South Springvale FC
- Full name: South Springvale FC
- Nickname: Aris
- Founded: 1968
- Ground: Warner Reserve
- Coach: Steve Voursoukis
- League: Victorian State League 1 South–East
- 2026: 1st of 11 (promoted), VPL 2
- Website: http://www.southspringvalefc.com.au
Home colours	Away colours

South Springvale FC is an Australian semi-professional soccer club based in Springvale, a suburb of Melbourne, Victoria. The club was formed by local Greek Australians in 1968, as 'Sandown Dynamo'. The club currently competes in the Victorian State League Division 1. Their home ground is Warner Reserve.

South Springvale achieved national notoriety by qualifying for the 2014 FFA Cup Round of 32.

== History ==
South Springvale was founded in 1968 by Greek immigrants who migrated to Australia in the early to mid-1960s. The club was initially called Sandown Dynamo and played at Springvale High Schools’ facilities. During the next 12 years, Sandown Dynamo competed in the Victorian Amateur Leagues, but rose quickly in the 1980s and 1990s, entering the Victorian Provisional Leagues in 1985, and gaining promotion to the Victorian State Leagues in 1992, reaching Victorian State League Division 2 by 2000.

In 1980 the club shifted to Warner Reserve whilst also changing its name to South Springvale Soccer Club. Over the next two decades the club endured many good years culminating in three championships, in 1990, 1991 and 1995, whilst also claiming the State League Cup in 1994. Since the 2014 season, the team has been competing in the FFV State League 1 South East.

In 2014, South Springvale defeated National Premier Leagues Victoria side Hume City in 3–0 in the 2014 Dockerty Cup quarter-final to become the first Victorian club to qualify for the inaugural FFA Cup Round of 32, the first national round. South Springvale and Hakoah Sydney City East FC were the only two fourth tier sides to win through to the Round of 32. Aris drew South Cardiff FC and played them on 29 July as the home team at Kingston Heath Soccer Complex, winning on penalties after twice equalising after going behind, the first time through Florea and the second time through Dimitrakopoulos. Approximately 1,500 people were in attendance. Aris then drew Gold Coast, Queensland based side Palm Beach SC away from home, and so travelled to Queensland on 23 September 2014. In front of 2,300 people at Robina Stadium, Palm Beach narrowly won 1–0 through a Boxell goal in the 81st minute and ended Aris' FFA Cup adventure. In 2019, Aris were promoted to State League 1 following a 2nd place finish that season. The club is aiming to gain promotion to the NPL system for the first time this year.

== Name and logo ==
The club adopted its nickname and colours from Greek side Aris Thessaloniki F.C. The Greek side is known for its Yellow and black colours and this is why South Springvale play in those colours. Further, the club's crest is a homage to Aris with the logo even adopting the Greek spelling of Aris being 'APHS'.

== Honors ==
State

- (Victoria (state)) Dockety Cup – Runners Up: 2014.
- (Victoria (state)) Victorian State League Division 1 – : Winners: 2026.
- (Victoria (state)) Victorian State League Division 1 South East – : Champions: 2026.
- (Victoria (state)) Victorian State League Division 2 South East – Runners up: 2019.
- (Victoria (state)) Victorian State League Division 3 South East – Runners up: 2002, 2010.
- (Victoria (state)) Victorian State League Division 4 – Champions: 1995.
- (Victoria (state)) Victorian Provisional League Division 1 – Champions: 1991.
- (Victoria (state)) Victorian Provisional League Division 2 – Champions: 1990.
- (Victoria (state)) Victorian Provisional League Division 3 – Runners up: 1988.
- (Victoria (state)) Victorian State League Champions Cup – Champions: 1994.

== Players ==
=== Current senior squad ===
Note: Flags indicate national team as defined under FIFA eligibility rules; some limited exceptions apply. Players may hold more than one non-FIFA nationality.

No.	Pos.	Nation	Player
—	GK	AUS	Josh Dorran
—	GK	AUS	Evan Kraloglou
—	DF	AUS	Jarryd Barnes
—	DF	AUS	Adriano Chiappetta
—	DF	KOR	Kitae (Andy) Park
—	DF	AUS	Steven Sifinos
—	DF	AUS	Thomas Simos
—	DF	AUS	Christos Tahmazis
—	DF	AUS	Peter Varsamis
—	MF	AUS	Joshua Caruana

No.	Pos.	Nation	Player
—	MF	JPN	Takeru Honda
—	MF	AUS	Cody Martindale
—	MF	AUS	Dimitar "Berbatov" Mitkov
—	FW	AUS	Timothy Atherinos
—	FW	AUS	Aron Handakas
—	FW	AUS	Jason Ricciuti
—	FW	AUS	Zeik Zeik
—	FW	AUS	Marcelo Arapis
—	FW	AUS	Alhaji Tarawally

=== Current reserve squad ===
Note: Flags indicate national team as defined under FIFA eligibility rules; some limited exceptions apply. Players may hold more than one non-FIFA nationality.

No.	Pos.	Nation	Player
—	GK	AUS	Jordan Gammoh
—	DF	AUS	Christian Altidis
—	DF	AUS	Emanuel Emmanouilidis
—	DF	AUS	Filimonas Kasimis
—	DF	AUS	Luke Michailidis
—	DF	AUS	Isaac Papakyriakopoulos
—	DF	AUS	Elijah Tracanelli
—	DF	AUS	Georgio Tsatsos
—	MF	AUS	Vinda Chheang
—	MF	AUS	Blake Dickson

No.	Pos.	Nation	Player
—	MF	AUS	Jaz Omerogullari
—	MF	AUS	Eric Pagoulatos
—	MF	AUS	Athan Panagiotou
—	MF	AUS	Sebastian Davies
—	FW	AUS	Juan Hernandez
—	FW	AUS	Frankie Varsamis
—	FW	AUS	Anthony Vecchi
—	FW	AUS	Marko Vrban
—	FW	GRE	Frank Mellios
—	FW	VIE	Felix Nguyen

== Club officials ==
=== Committee ===
- President: Heather Paliouras
- Vice President: Jim Paliouras
- Secretary: Haroula Dellas
- Treasurer: Jim Banasios
- Committee Member: Spyro Lambas

=== Men’s team staff ===
- Senior Team Head Coach: Saleem Nasser
- Senior Assistant Coach: Hamish Swami
- Senior Team Manager: Peter Tragakis
- Reserve Team Head Coach: Peter Panagiotou
- Reserve Team Manager: Andrew Pagoulatos
- Goalkeeper Coach: Super Danny Norton
- Physiotherapist: Adil Rodrigues Chico
- Masseur: Adam Bedikian
