= Lokomotiv Cove FC =

Australian soccer club

- Full name: Lokomotiv Cove Football Club
- Nickname: Loko
- Founded: 2007
- Ground: Alexandria Park Oval, Sydney
- Chairman: (Australia) Rebecca Smith
- League: Eastern Suburbs Football Association
Home colours	Away colours

Lokomotiv Cove Football Club is an Australian amateur football (soccer) club based in Alexandria, a suburb of Sydney. They currently play in the Eastern Suburbs Football Association.

== History ==
The club was formed in early 2007 by members of the Cove, a supporter group of A-League club Sydney FC. However the club's beginnings trace back to 2005, when a charity match was played between members of the Cove and the Marinators (Central Coast Mariners supporters).

While it's believed that the name of the club was penned because of the use of trains to get to games on the Central Coast, it was actually suggested by Darren Bozinoski, a member of the Cove, at the Campsie Hotel while watching an A-League fixture. The name came about after a conversation with Darren, Victor Azevedo and Christian Thompson about the naming of the Sydney FC supporters' team. Each person started suggesting names by using the name of Eastern European football clubs and putting Cove at the end of the name, but when Darren suggested Lokomotiv, a name usually associated with Railway company football teams from the former Eastern Bloc, everyone agreed that the name sounded great and decided that should be the name of the new team.

The name 'Lokomotiv' was formally used at the supporters Charity match a week later; When Christian Thompson was asked by the ground announcer at the Cove vs. Marinators charity match what the Sydney FC supporters team would be called. Christian, remembering the conversation the week before, said "We're called Lokomotiv Cove", and since that moment the name has remained.

Later in that season a Lokomotiv Cove team played a match against Den United, a Queensland Roar supporter team in a curtain-raiser to a Queensland Roar-Sydney FC match at Suncorp Stadium.

== Inaugural Season – 2007 ==
After being incorporated in November 2006, Lokomotiv played its first match as an official club in the Don Parkes Trophy at Mingara Recreation Centre on the Central Coast. Following an enthralling encounter played over 80 minutes due to the extreme summer temperatures the game was locked at 2–2. A penalty shootout followed with Lokomotiv missing the final penalty and losing 5–4. On 20 January 2007, the club played its second charity match this time in the 52,000 seat Suncorp Stadium as a curtain raiser to the Queensland Roar vs Sydney FC A-League encounter. Played over 35 minutes Lokomotiv conceded a goal with less than 5 minutes remaining giving it little chance of defending the trophy won in the previous year. Under the guidance of the assistant manager the result ended 1–0. Soon after, inaugural coach and director of football Darren Bozinoski decided to move to the US for personal reasons and club president Ben Willing reluctantly accepted his resignation.

Pre-season trials and training began upon return of the squad to Sydney with the club developing a nomadic existence at Sydney's Centennial Park and Wentworth Park while home ground Tempe Reserve was required for completion of the cricket season. In February, Adam Coates was appointed the club's new head coach and made responsible for grading the teams. The task was made more difficult by the fact that it was the first time many players had played in the Eastern Suburbs Football Association where the competition structure and standard differed considerably to other associations in the Sydney Metropolitan Area.

The club's first competitive match was played by the senior team who were entered into the ESFA Men's division 2 competition. The match was the 1st rd of the ESFA Cup and was a successful 4–1 victory over Queens Park AA4 team. This began a cup run that was to end at the hands of Maroubra AA1 in the quarter finals on 11 June. Loko matched it with the current division 1 leaders and had an open goal attempt miraculously saved in the dying seconds to prevent the game going to extra time.

From early in the season, it became apparent that the club's strongest prospects for success lay with the Senior Women's team, who competed in Division 3. The team, coached by Cesar Bolivar, included Norwegian midfielder Gry Bakke, who scored 48 goals, and Noni Payling, who provided many of Bakke's assists. Both players had previously represented the University of Newcastle in the Northern NSW Women's League. Their experience contributed to the development of several teammates who were in their first season of competitive football. The team won the club's first league premiership; however, injuries and travel commitments prevented Bakke and Payling from participating in the finals, and the team did not secure the championship double.

The Senior Men's squad recovered from a slow start in the league, winning six of their final eight matches to secure third place in the Division 2 premiership. However, key central defenders Kevin Collins and Damien Hagerty were unavailable for the finals due to pre-arranged travel commitments to Glasgow. As a result, the team suffered a 7–0 loss to Maccabi Hakoah in their first finals appearance.

In the lower men's division the club was less successful due to the new combinations and lack of competitive knowledge of the new competition for many players and the club grading committee. The division 4,5,6 & 8 teams all won the wooden spoon in their respective competitions while the division 7 team finished third and division 3 team mid-table. The division 7 team earned Loko's first championship however with a 1–0 over the Lions at Hensley Athletic Field in front of a crowd of around 200 people. The goal scored in the last 5 minutes lead to a large celebration amongst the Terminus.

Gry Bakke was awarded the Golden Boot for the district.

== Season 2008 ==
Season 2008 was not quite as successful for Lokomotiv with no league champions or grand finalists. The SW3 team and the AA5 team (2007 AA7's) made the finals of their respective competitions but were both knocked out in elimination matches. The club's AA1 team finished the season in equal 4th but missed the finals on goal difference.

== Season 2009 – ESFA Premier League ==
In 2009, Lokomotiv Cove hired Chris Karatzis to coach the premier league squad. Chris brought with him experience from Bankstown City Lions, Sydney Olympic, APIA Leichhardt and Canterbury-Marrickville, coaching in the New South Wales Premier League, National Youth League in the NSL days and in the NSW youth league system. He recruited strongly with 4 players coming from Dulwich Hill FC in the New South Wales State League Division One, Terry Conistis from St George Saints, Sam La Rocca, former Marconi Stallions star, and Derek Poimer former Australian youth international and West Adelaide SC player of the year in the National Soccer League. Early in March, Chris secured the signing of Chad Gibson, former Queensland Roar captain. Former Socceroo Paul Bilokapic joined the club not long afterwards. These were significant signings for an amateur club only in existence for 3 years.

These players supplemented a squad that already included a number of AA1 players from the previous year including Sean Widera who formerly played with Adelaide United in the National Soccer League and Henry Glynn who has previously played in the League of Ireland prior to twice breaking his leg.

Lokomotiv Cove FC entered the NSW Tiger Turf Cup (aka Waratah Cup) for the first time and reached Round 2.

== Season 2010 ==
In 2010, Lokomotiv Cove saw its AA8 side win the League and Grand Final double, the first time a Loko team achieved this feat. Four Loko teams won through to their respective Grand Finals and all four teams won their Grand Final matches.

A haul of 1 League Champion and 4 Grand Final Winners trophies was, at that time, Lokomotiv Cove's most successful season so far.

== Season 2011 ==
In 2011 Lokomotiv Cove managed to get seven teams into the finals, including two teams in Men's All Age Division 6. The AA6A side (the "4 for 10s") were crowned League Champions.

Five teams won through to their Grand Finals, including both in AA6, which set up the club's first all-Loko Grand Final. The AA6 Grand Final was won by Loko's AA6B side (the "Fat Barstuds") denying the AA6A side the League and Grand Final double.

A haul of 1 League Champion and 2 Grand Final Winners trophies capped off a strong season.

== Season 2012 ==
In 2012 Lokomotiv Cove had five teams in the finals: Men's AA2, AA6, AA8A and AA10, and Women's AAW4.

The Women's AAW4 team won their Grand Final 2–1 against Queens Park Puma's.

== Season 2013 ==
In 2013 Lokomotiv Cove had a record three teams become League Champions: AA6B, O35 Div 3 and AAW3.

A whopping ten teams qualified for finals, also a club record.

Three teams won through to their respective Grand Finals, AA6B, AA8 and AAW3. Two of those teams (AA8 and AAW3) won their Grand Finals.

== Season 2024 ==
In 2024, Lokomotiv Cove saw double success from their AA6 Men's Saturday team, who finished league champions on goal difference, beating out UNSW for the Premiership. In the Finals stage, they recorded 2-1 and 1-0 victories over UNSW and Maroubra respectively to claim the Grand Final trophy, cementing their double.

Notably, a match from the league season against Coogee United garnered press coverage, when Coogee United were found to have utilised occasional Socceroo call-up Daniel Arzani as a ring-in for the match. Lokomotiv Cove finished the match as 3-2 winners, with Arzani reportedly leaving early after members of the crowd recognised him.

== Colours and badge ==
The Club uses the same colours (sky blue, navy blue and orange) as A-League team, Sydney FC.

The Lokomotiv Cove badge is based around an anchor, which is also used on most of the traditional flags and crests of the harbour city of Sydney, Australia. The anchor has "wings", which represents the grille seen on the front of many trains.

== Teams ==
The club currently has seventeen (17) teams entered into ESFA league competitions for 2012. There are fifteen men's and two women's teams. The men play in the ESFA Premier League, the Men's All Age Divisions 1 to 10 and Over 35's, while the women play in Senior Women's Divisions 2 and 3.

== Supporters ==
Lokomotiv Cove has a supporters group which is called The Terminus.

== Honours ==
- League Champions: 7
  - 2007 Senior Women's Division 3
  - 2010 All Age Men's Division 8
  - 2011 All Age Men's Division 6
  - 2013 All Age Men's Division 6
  - 2013 Over 35 Men's Division 3
  - 2013 All Age Women's Division 3
  - 2024 All Age Men's Division 6
- Grand Final Winners 12
  - 2007 All Age Division 7 (1–0 vs Lions FC)
  - 2010 All Age Women Division 2 (2–1 vs Coogee)
  - 2010 All Age Division 1 (1–0 vs Barnstoneworth)
  - 2010 All Age Division 5 (2–1 vs Sydney University)
  - 2010 All Age Division 8 (4–0 vs Dunbar Rovers)
  - 2011 All Age Division 3 (1–0 vs Pagewood)
  - 2011 All Age Division 6 (2–1 vs Lokomotiv Cove)
  - 2012 All Age Women Division 4 (2–1 vs Queens Park Pumas)
  - 2013 All Age Division 8 (0–0, 4–2 in penalties vs Waverley)
  - 2013 All Age Women Division 3 (5–4 vs Maccabi)
  - 2022 All Age Men's Division 6 (2-0 vs Mascot)
  - 2024 All Age Men's Division 6 (1-0 vs Maroubra)
- ESFA Cup: 0
  - 2007 Quarter Finals
  - 2008 Not Held
  - 2009 2nd Round
  - 2010 Semi Finals
  - 2011 Quarter Finals
  - 2012
- Don Parkes Trophy: 2
  - 2005 4–0 vs. Dinamo Marinators
  - 2012 5–4 vs. Yellow Army
- Annual vs Roar Fans: 1
  - 2006 3–0 vs. Den United
- Soccerwhos Trophy: 1
  - 2007 5–4 vs. Aussies On Tour (2 June 2007)
- FFDU Supporters Club 5-a-side: 1
  - 2011 2–1 vs SBS Television (30 October 2011)
- Waratah Cup 0
  - 2009 2nd Round
  - 2010 2nd Round
  - 2011 Preliminary Round
  - 2012 Did not enter

== Records ==
=== Club ===
Lokomotiv Cove F.C. played its first competitive match in the ESFA Cup competition, Round 1, 25 March 2007 vs. Queens Park. Lokomotiv Cove won the match 4–1.

- First Goal:
  - ESFA Cup: Phillip Wood (v Queens Park AA4 25 March 2007)
  - League: Domino Postiglione (v Sydney University AA8 1 April 2007)
- Record Victory: 27–0 (v Kytherians AA6 22 April 2012)
- Record Defeat: 18–1 (v Sydney University AA8, 2008)
- Record Draw: 7–7 (v Pagewood AA6 13 May 2007)

=== Player ===
- Most goals:
  - All time: Phillip Wood (52), Gry Bakke (48)
  - Single match: Gry Bakke (8 goals vs Queens Park SW3, 29 April 2007)
