= Western Condors FC =

Western Condors
- Full name: Western Condors FC
- Nickname(s): Condors
- Founded: 1983
- Ground: Choppin Park, Plumpton
- Capacity: 10,000
- League: Southern Districts
- Website: http://www.westerncondors.com/

Western Condors, is a semi-professional soccer club, based and located in the Smithfield area of New South Wales.

The club was founded in 1983 by Chilean migrants and is formerly known as The New Chilean Football Club and has competed in the NSW Premier League system since 1985.

== Senior Team History ==
In 2017, Western Condors played in NSW State League

In 2018, Western Condors finished 7th with 26 competition points, missing the finals by 9 points.

In season 2019, they lasted compete in the NSW State League competition.
