= Bass Hill RSL SC =

Bass Hill RSL
- Full name: Bass Hill RSL Soccer Club
- Founded: 1963
- Ground: Walshaw Park
- League: Bankstown District Amateur Football Association
- Website: http://basshillsoccer.com.au
Home colours

Bass Hill RSL Soccer Club is an Australian soccer club based in Bass Hill, Sydney, New South Wales. Founded in 1963, the club currently competes in the Bankstown District Amateur Football Association, with games played from Walshaw Park.

In 2010 the team finished 2nd on the table, but won their Grand Final 1–0 to Chullora Wolves who were Premiers in the BDAFA Premier League 2 Competition.
