= 2009 Football NSW season =

Football New South Wales
- Season: 2009
- Champions: Sutherland Sharks

The Football NSW 2009 season was the top flight football competition format in New South Wales. The competition consisted of four divisions across the State of New South Wales.

== League Tables ==
=== 2009 NSW Premier League ===
NSW Premier League
- Season: 2009
- Champions: Sutherland Sharks
- Premiers: Sydney United
- Top goalscorer: Matthew Mayora (15)

The 2009 NSW Premier League season was played over 22 rounds, beginning on 1 March 2009, with the regular season concluding on the 9th of August.

Pos	Team	Pld	W	D	L	GF	GA	GD	Pts	Qualification or relegation
1	Sydney United	22	13	7	2	42	22	+20	46	Qualified for the 2009 NSW Premier League Finals
2	Marconi Stallions	22	11	6	5	44	22	+22	39	Qualified for the 2009 NSW Premier League Finals
3	Sutherland Sharks (C)	22	10	8	4	46	26	+20	38	Qualified for the 2009 NSW Premier League Finals
4	Bankstown City	22	11	5	6	39	31	+8	38	Qualified for the 2009 NSW Premier League Finals
5	Manly United	22	10	7	5	33	22	+11	37	Qualified for the 2009 NSW Premier League Finals
6	West Sydney Berries	22	8	6	8	37	37	0	30	
7	Blacktown City	22	7	7	8	29	31	−2	28	
8	Sydney Olympic	22	8	4	10	37	43	−6	28	
9	Bonnyrigg White Eagles	22	6	8	8	28	39	−11	26	
10	Penrith Nepean United	22	6	5	11	19	31	−12	23	Withdrew at end of the season
11	APIA Leichhardt Tigers	22	5	7	10	30	38	−8	22	
12	South Coast Wolves	22	1	2	19	20	62	−42	5	

Source: TeleChoice Premier League
Rules for classification: 1) points; 2) goal difference; 3) number of goals scored.
(C) Champions

==== Finals ====
Qualifying Finals
2	Marconi Stallions	0
3	Sutherland Sharks	1
4	Bankstown City	0 (2)
5	Manly United FC (p)	0 (4)

Semi-finals
1	Sydney United FC	2
3	Sutherland Sharks	3
2	Marconi Stallions	2
5	Manly United FC	0

Preliminary Final
1	Sydney United FC	2
2	Marconi Stallions	4

Grand Final
3	Sutherland Sharks	4
2	Marconi Stallions	1

=== 2009 NSW Super League ===
NSW Super League
- Season: 2009
- Champions: Spirit FC
- Premiers: Rockdale City Suns

The 2009 NSW Super League season was played over 22 rounds, beginning on 24 March with the regular season concluding on 16 August 2009.

Pos	Team	Pld	W	D	L	GF	GA	GD	Pts	Qualification or relegation
1	Rockdale City Suns (P)	22	14	4	4	46	22	+24	46	Promoted to the 2010 NSW Premier League
2	Parramatta FC	22	15	1	6	38	20	+18	46	Qualified for the 2010 NSW Super League Finals
3	Spirit FC (C)	22	11	6	5	42	23	+19	39	Qualified for the 2010 NSW Super League Finals
4	Sydney University	22	10	6	6	37	25	+12	36	Qualified for the 2010 NSW Super League Finals
5	St George FC	22	10	6	6	46	35	+11	36	Qualified for the 2010 NSW Super League Finals
6	Macarthur Rams	22	10	6	6	40	31	+9	36	
7	Northern Tigers	22	8	3	11	34	46	−12	27	
8	Granville Rage	22	6	5	11	21	29	−8	23	
9	Central Coast Lightning	22	6	4	12	28	46	−18	22	
10	FC Bossy Liverpool	22	5	6	11	25	41	−16	21	
11	Mt Druitt Town Rangers	22	4	6	12	39	58	−19	18	
12	Fraser Park	22	4	5	13	32	52	−20	17	

Updated to match(es) played on 16 August 2009. Source: socceraust.co.uk
Rules for classification: 1) points; 2) goal difference; 3) number of goals scored.
(C) Champions; (P) Promoted

==== Finals ====
Qualifying Finals
2	Parramatta FC (a.e.t.)	2
3	Spirit FC	1
4	Sydney University	1
5	St George FC	0

Semi-finals
1	Rockdale City Suns	0
2	Parramatta FC	1
3	Spirit FC	1
4	Sydney University	0

Preliminary Final
1	Rockdale City Suns	1
3	Spirit FC	2

Grand Final
2	Parramatta FC	1 (8)
3	Spirit FC (p)	1 (9)

=== 2009 NSW State League Division 1 ===
NSW State League Division 1
- Season: 2009
- Champions: Mounties Wanderers
- Premiers: Dulwich Hill FC

The 2009 NSW State League Division 1 season was played over 22 rounds, beginning on 14 March with the regular season concluding on 16 August 2010.

Pos	Team	Pld	W	D	L	GF	GA	GD	Pts	Qualification or relegation
1	Dulwich Hill (P)	22	16	3	3	58	18	+40	51	Promoted to the 2010 NSW Super League
2	Mounties FC (C)	22	14	4	4	45	25	+20	46	Qualified for the 2010 NSW Super League Finals
3	Schofield Scorpions	22	13	3	6	49	30	+19	42	Qualified for the 2010 NSW Super League Finals
4	Inter Lions	22	10	7	5	45	28	+17	37	Qualified for the 2010 NSW Super League Finals
5	University of NSW	22	11	4	7	45	30	+15	37	Qualified for the 2010 NSW Super League Finals
6	Blacktown Spartans	22	11	4	7	27	27	0	37	
7	Stanmore Hawks	22	8	3	11	35	39	−4	27	
8	Sydney Wanderers (R)	22	6	5	11	26	37	−11	23	Relegated to the 2010 NSW State League Division 2
9	Balmain SC	22	4	8	10	25	33	−8	20	
10	Fairfield City Lions	22	4	7	11	35	60	−25	19	
11	Hurstville FC	22	3	6	13	34	60	−26	15	
12	Hills United	22	4	2	16	19	56	−37	14	

Updated to match(es) played on 16 August 2009. Source: socceraust.co.uk
Rules for classification: 1) points; 2) goal difference; 3) number of goals scored.
(C) Champions; (P) Promoted; (R) Relegated

==== Finals ====
Qualifying Finals
2	Mounties FC	2
3	Schofield Scorpions	1
4	Inter Lions	0
5	University of NSW	2

Semi-finals
1	Dulwich Hill FC	1
2	Mounties FC	2
3	Schofield Scorpions	0
5	University of NSW	1

Preliminary Final
1	Dulwich Hill FC	3
5	University of NSW	2

Grand Final
2	Mounties FC	2
1	Dulwich Hill FC	1

=== 2009 NSW State League Division 2 ===
NSW State League Division 2
- Season: 2009
- Champions: Colo Colo Wanderers
- Premiers: Camden Tigers
- Promoted: Camden Tigers; Hurstville City Minotaurs

The 2009 NSW State League Division 2 season was played over 22 rounds, beginning on 28 March with the regular season concluding on 30 August 2009. There were 16 teams divided into two conferences, North and South. There were 14 rounds of conference games followed by 8 rounds of combined conference games. The top five teams on a combined ladder competed in the finals series.

Pos	Team	Pld	W	D	L	GF	GA	GD	Pts	Qualification or relegation
1	Camden Tigers (P)	22	15	2	5	63	18	+45	47	Promoted to the 2010 NSW State League 1
2	Gladesville Ryde Magic (P)	22	13	8	1	55	24	+31	47	Promoted to the 2010 NSW State League 1
3	Colo Colo Wanderers (C)	22	13	5	4	45	22	+23	44	Qualified for the 2010 NSW Super League Finals
4	Hurstville City Minotaurs	22	13	5	4	49	32	+17	44	Qualified for the 2010 NSW Super League Finals
5	Prospect United	22	12	4	6	54	40	+14	40	Qualified for the 2010 NSW Super League Finals
6	Roosters FC	22	12	3	7	61	36	+25	39	
7	Bathurst '75	21	10	3	8	44	35	+9	33	
8	Fairfield Bulls	22	9	5	8	37	32	+5	32	
9	Sydney Cedars	22	9	5	8	38	43	−5	32	
10	Hawkesbury City	22	9	2	11	42	43	−1	29	
11	Hakoah FC	21	7	6	8	41	42	−1	27	
12	FC Gazy Lansvale	22	8	1	13	39	37	+2	25	
13	Springwood United	22	7	2	13	29	46	−17	23	
14	Luddenham United	22	5	5	12	32	44	−12	20	
15	White City (R)	22	4	0	18	29	79	−50	12	Relegated or Withdrawnn
16	Penang FC (R)	22	1	0	21	15	100	−85	3	Relegated or Withdrawnn

Updated to match(es) played on 30 August 2009. Source: socceraust.co.uk
Rules for classification: 1) points; 2) goal difference; 3) number of goals scored.
(C) Champions; (P) Promoted; (R) Relegated

==== Finals ====
Qualifying Finals
2	Gladesville Ryde Magic	3
3	Colo Colo Wanderers	2
4	Hurstville City Minotaurs (p)	0 (9)
5	Prospect United	0 (8)

Semi-finals
1	Camden Tigers	3
2	Gladesville Ryde Magic	2
3	Colo Colo Wanderers	3
5	Hurstville City Minotaurs	1

Preliminary Final
2	Gladesville Ryde Magic	1
3	Colo Colo Wanderers	2

Grand Final
1	Camden Tigers	1
3	Colo Colo Wanderers	2
