= 2010 Football NSW season =

Football New South Wales
- Season: 2010
- Champions: Blacktown City

The Football NSW 2010 season was the top flight football competition format in New South Wales. The competition consisted of four divisions across the State of New South Wales.

== League Tables ==
=== 2010 NSW Premier League ===
NSW Premier League
- Season: 2010

The 2010 NSW Premier League season was played over 22 rounds, beginning on 27 February with the regular season concluding on 1 August 2010.

Pos	Team	Pld	W	D	L	GF	GA	GD	Pts	Qualification or relegation
1	Bonnyrigg White Eagles	22	13	6	3	45	20	+25	45	Qualified for the 2010 NSW Premier League Finals
2	Blacktown City (C)	22	12	4	6	42	27	+15	40	Qualified for the 2010 NSW Premier League Finals
3	Sydney United	22	11	6	5	39	26	+13	39	Qualified for the 2010 NSW Premier League Finals
4	APIA Leichhardt Tigers	22	12	3	7	39	37	+2	39	Qualified for the 2010 NSW Premier League Finals
5	Marconi Stallions	22	11	3	8	26	26	0	36	Qualified for the 2010 NSW Premier League Finals
6	Sutherland Sharks	22	9	4	9	36	29	+7	31	
7	Rockdale City Suns	22	6	12	4	23	23	0	30	
8	Bankstown City	22	7	5	10	37	41	−4	26	
9	Manly United	22	7	4	11	24	31	−7	25	
10	South Coast Wolves	22	6	4	12	32	39	−7	22	
11	Sydney Olympic	22	6	3	13	29	40	−11	21	
12	West Sydney Berries (R)	22	2	6	14	17	50	−33	12	Relegated to the 2011 NSW Super League

Source: socceraust.co.uk, NSW Premier League
Rules for classification: 1) points; 2) goal difference; 3) number of goals scored.
(C) Champions; (R) Relegated

=== 2010 NSW Super League ===
NSW Super League
- Season: 2010

The 2010 NSW Super League season was played over 22 rounds, beginning on 20 March with the regular season concluding on 15 August 2010.

Pos	Team	Pld	W	D	L	GF	GA	GD	Pts	Qualification or relegation
1	Parramatta Eagles (C, P)	22	15	3	4	49	15	+34	48	Promoted to the 2011 NSW Premier League
2	Northern Tigers	22	13	4	5	45	26	+19	43	Qualified for the 2010 NSW Super League Finals
3	St George	22	11	5	6	32	26	+6	38	Qualified for the 2010 NSW Super League Finals
4	Spirit FC	22	10	3	9	33	36	−3	33	Qualified for the 2010 NSW Super League Finals
5	Macarthur Rams	22	9	5	8	42	31	+11	32	Qualified for the 2010 NSW Super League Finals
6	FC Bossy Liverpool (R)	22	9	3	10	29	36	−7	30	Withdrew at end of the season
7	Sydney University	22	7	7	8	32	31	+1	28	
8	Granville Rage	22	8	4	10	35	38	−3	28	
9	Fraser Park	22	8	1	13	35	40	−5	25	
10	Central Coast Lightning	22	7	3	12	33	51	−18	24	
11	Dulwich Hill	22	5	7	10	30	39	−9	22	
12	Mt Druitt Town Rangers (R)	22	6	3	13	27	53	−26	21	Relegated to the 2011 NSW State League 1

(C) Champions; (P) Promoted; (R) Relegated

^{NB} Two matches were postponed and subsequently couldn't be played.

=== 2010 NSW State League Division 1 ===
NSW State League Division 1
- Season: 2010
- Champions: Fairfield City Lions
- Promoted: Hills United; Blacktown Spartans

The 2010 NSW State League Division 1 season was played over 22 rounds, beginning on 20 March with the regular season concluding on 15 August 2010.

Pos	Team	Pld	W	D	L	GF	GA	GD	Pts	Qualification or relegation
1	Hills United (P)	22	14	5	3	46	29	+17	47	Promoted to the 2011 NSW Super League
2	Blacktown Spartans (P)	22	12	8	2	55	33	+22	44	Promoted to the 2011 NSW Super League
3	Fairfield City Lions (C)	22	12	4	6	58	46	+12	40	Qualified for the 2010 NSW State League Division 1 Finals
4	Schofield Scorpions	22	11	6	5	40	26	+14	39	Qualified for the 2010 NSW State League Division 1 Finals
5	Inter Lions	22	11	4	7	40	36	+4	37	Qualified for the 2010 NSW State League Division 1 Finals
6	Mounties Wanderers	22	10	5	7	40	32	+8	35	
7	Stanmore Hawks	22	8	7	7	38	31	+7	31	
8	Balmain SC	22	7	5	10	32	33	−1	26	
9	Camden Tigers	22	6	7	9	35	39	−4	25	
10	Gladesville Ryde Magic	22	6	4	12	27	40	−13	22	
11	University of NSW	22	2	6	14	21	39	−18	12	
12	Hurstville FC	22	1	3	18	26	74	−48	6	

(C) Champions; (P) Promoted

=== 2010 NSW State League Division 2 ===
NSW State League Division 2
- Season: 2010

The 2010 NSW State League Division 2 season was played over 22 rounds, beginning on 20 March with the regular season concluding on 22 August 2010.

Pos	Team	Pld	W	D	L	GF	GA	GD	Pts	Qualification or relegation
1	Fairfield Bulls (C, P)	22	12	6	4	49	27	+22	42	Promoted to the 2011 NSW State League Division 1
2	Fairfield Wanderers	22	12	5	5	36	23	+13	41	Qualified for the 2010 NSW State League Division 2 Finals
3	Hurstville City Minotaurs	22	12	3	7	41	33	+8	39	Qualified for the 2010 NSW State League Division 2 Finals
4	Luddenham United	22	11	5	6	31	32	−1	38	Qualified for the 2010 NSW State League Division 2 Finals
5	Roosters FC	22	10	4	8	43	35	+8	34	Qualified for the 2010 NSW State League Division 2 Finals
6	Springwood United	22	10	3	9	28	23	+5	33	
7	Belmore Hercules	22	8	7	7	31	26	+5	31	
8	Prospect United	22	8	6	8	28	33	−5	30	
9	FC Gazy Lansvale	22	9	2	11	41	42	−1	29	
10	Bathurst 75	22	6	4	12	22	39	−17	22	
11	Hawkesbury City	22	4	5	13	31	46	−15	17	
12	Hakoah FC	22	2	6	14	25	47	−22	12	

(C) Champions; (P) Promoted
