= 2021 Football NSW season =

Football New South Wales
- Season: 2021

The Football NSW 2021 season was the ninth season of football in New South Wales under the banner of the National Premier Leagues. The competition consists of four divisions across the state of New South Wales.

All competitions under Football NSW were cancelled on the 12th of August 2021 midway through the season due to the Covid-19 lockdown restrictions

== Competitions ==
=== 2021 National Premier League NSW Men's 1 ===
The season was cancelled on 12 August, due to on-going lockdowns associated with the COVID-19 pandemic in Australia, with no Premier declared, and with promotion and relegation suspended until the following season.

NPL NSW Men's 1
- Season: 2021
- Champions: No champion awarded
- Premiers: No premier awarded

==== League table ====
Pos	Team	Pld	W	D	L	GF	GA	GD	Pts
1	Blacktown City	17	11	3	3	36	17	+19	36
2	Sydney United 58	17	9	5	3	31	17	+14	32
3	Rockdale Ilinden	17	7	6	4	28	22	+6	27
4	Manly United	17	7	6	4	24	23	+1	27
5	Sydney Olympic	17	7	3	7	22	19	+3	24
6	Mt Druitt Town Rangers	17	6	5	6	21	25	−4	23
7	Wollongong Wolves	17	6	4	7	23	33	−10	22
8	APIA Leichhardt Tigers	17	6	3	8	20	21	−1	21
9	Marconi Stallions	17	3	10	4	24	25	−1	19
10	Northbridge Bulls	17	3	7	7	32	31	+1	16
11	Sutherland Sharks	17	3	5	9	19	32	−13	14
12	Sydney FC Youth	17	3	5	9	29	44	−15	14

Source: mygameday
Rules for classification: 1) points; 2) goal difference; 3) number of goals scored.

=== 2021 National Premier League NSW Men's 2 ===
NPL NSW Men's 2
- Season: 2021
- Champions: No champion awarded
- Premiers: No premier awarded
- Promoted: None

==== League Table ====
Pos	Team	Pld	W	D	L	GF	GA	GD	Pts
1	St George City	16	12	2	2	44	22	+22	38
2	Western Sydney Wanderers Youth	16	10	3	3	38	22	+16	33
3	Northern Tigers	16	10	1	5	29	22	+7	31
4	Central Coast Mariners Academy	16	9	2	5	40	26	+14	29
5	Hakoah Sydney City East	16	8	4	4	30	17	+13	28
6	NWS Spirit	16	8	3	5	37	23	+14	27
7	St George FC	16	7	1	8	20	27	−7	22
8	Bonnyrigg White Eagles	16	5	3	8	25	29	−4	18
9	SD Raiders	16	5	2	9	20	31	−11	17
10	Hills United	16	4	3	9	27	41	−14	15
11	Blacktown Spartans	16	3	2	11	14	32	−18	11
12	Mounties Wanderers	16	1	2	13	18	50	−32	5

Rules for classification: 1) points; 2) goal difference; 3) number of goals scored.

=== 2021 National Premier League NSW Men's 3 ===
NPL NSW Men's 3
- Season: 2021
- Champions: No champion awarded
- Premiers: No premier awarded
- Promoted: None

==== League Table ====
Pos	Team	Pld	W	D	L	GF	GA	GD	Pts
1	Rydalmere Lions	16	11	3	2	40	13	+27	36
2	Bankstown City Lions	16	9	5	2	39	28	+11	32
3	Dulwich Hill	16	9	4	3	43	21	+22	31
4	Bankstown United	16	8	4	4	31	24	+7	28
5	Gladesville Ryde Magic	16	8	1	7	30	34	−4	25
6	Central Coast United	16	6	5	5	30	26	+4	23
7	Inter Lions	16	7	2	7	33	32	+1	23
8	Macarthur Rams	16	6	2	8	33	30	+3	20
9	Sydney University	16	5	2	9	25	39	−14	17
10	Dunbar Rovers	16	4	3	9	23	34	−11	15
11	Canterbury Bankstown	16	3	6	7	22	33	−11	15
12	Inner West Hawks	16	1	1	14	9	44	−35	4

Rules for classification: 1) points; 2) goal difference; 3) number of goals scored.

=== 2021 National Premier League NSW Men's 4 ===
NPL NSW Men's 4
- Season: 2021
- Champions: No champion awarded
- Premiers: No premier awarded
- Promoted: None

==== League Table ====
Pos	Team	Pld	W	D	L	GF	GA	GD	Pts	Qualification or relegation
1	Newcastle Jets Youth	15	13	1	1	69	15	+54	40	
2	Fraser Park	16	11	3	2	46	21	+25	36	
3	Camden Tigers	16	7	6	3	37	28	+9	27	
4	Parramatta FC	16	8	3	5	34	25	+9	27	
5	UNSW	16	6	7	3	26	19	+7	25	
6	Nepean FC	16	6	4	6	24	24	0	22	
7	Hurstville FC	16	6	3	7	27	25	+2	21	
8	Hawkesbury City	16	6	3	7	30	29	+1	21	
9	Prospect United	15	4	6	5	20	27	−7	18	
10	South Coast Flame	16	3	2	11	15	37	−22	11	
11	Western Rage	16	2	5	9	12	40	−28	11	
12	Western NSW Mariners (R)	16	0	3	13	16	66	−50	3	Left at end of season (Note: Senior clubs were withdrawn from NSW competitions.)

Source: sportstg.com
Rules for classification: 1) points; 2) goal difference; 3) number of goals scored.
(R) Relegated
