= 2013 Waratah Cup =

Tournament details
- Country: Australia
- Teams: 97

Final positions
- Champions: APIA Leichhardt Tigers
- Runners-up: Sutherland Sharks

Tournament statistics
- Matches played: 96

The 2013 Waratah Cup was the 11th season of the Waratah Cup association football knockout competition, the main domestic cup competition in New South Wales.

The defending champions were National Premier Leagues NSW side Sutherland Sharks, who beat APIA Leichhardt Tigers 4–1 in the 2012 final. It was the second time Sutherland had won the title in their history. They entered the competition in Round 4 alongside all National Premier Leagues NSW teams, advancing all the way to the Grand Final and an eventual loss to APIA Leichhardt Tigers. A record 97 teams entered the competition.

The 2013 champions were APIA Leichhardt Tigers – their fourth title (including predecessor knockout cup competitions) – who beat Sutherland Sharks in the Cup final at Seymour Shaw Park, which was a rematch of the previous season's Grand Final after goals from Jason Oswell, Franco Parisi, and Sean Symons.

== Teams ==
97 teams entered the competition, representing a tournament record. The draw for the entire tournament was conducted prior to Round 1.

Round	Clubs remaining	Clubs involved	Winners from previous round	New entries this round	Leagues entering at this round	Scheduled playing date
Round 1	97	61	0	61	National Premier Leagues Capital Football; NSW State League Division 2 FNSW Grassroots teams	27 March
Round 2	68	32	32	0	none	10 April
Round 3	52	40	16	24	National Premier Leagues NSW 2 NSW State League Division 1	24 April
Round 4	32	32	20	12	National Premier Leagues NSW	8 May
Round of 16	16	16	16	0	none	22 May
Quarter-finals	8	8	8	0	none	5 June
Semi-finals	4	4	4	0	none	19 June
Grand Final	2	2	2	0	none	7 July

== Round 1 ==
A total of 58 teams competed.

Tie no	Home team (tier)	Score	Away team (tier)
1	Glenmore Park (-)	2–2	Liverpool (-)
Liverpool advance 3–2 on penalties.
2	Helensburgh Thistle (-)	1–2	Bass Hill RSL (-)
3	Springwood United (-)	1–11	Dunbar Rovers (-)
4	Parklea (-)	2–2	Loftus Yarrawarrah (-)
Parklea advance 4–3 on penalties.
5	Castle Hill RSL Rockets (-)	2–5	Southern Bulls (4)
6	Maroubra United (-)	5–0	Revesby Workers (-)
7	Port Kembla (-)	7–0	Leichhardt Saints (-)
8	Wollongong United (-)		FC Bossy Liverpool (-)
9	Auburn (-)	2–1	Coogee United (-)
10	Belmore United (4)	3–4	Canberra Olympic (1)
11	Auburn II (-)	0–3	Blaxland (-)
12	Miranda Magpies (-)	3–4	Willoughby Dalleys (-)
13	University of NSW (4)	5–1	St. Marys Band Club (-)
14	Tarrawanna (-)	4–2	Oatley RSL (-)

Tie no	Home team (tier)	Score	Away team (tier)
15	Mosman (-)	3–2	Ararat (-)
16	Fairfield City Lions (4)	1–0	Phoenix FC (-)
17	Picton Rangers (-)	0–1	Lilli Pilli (-)
18	Bankstown Sports Strikers (-)	0–9	Bulli (-)
19	Padstow United (-)	4–1	Hurstville ZFC (4)
20	Schofield Scorpions (4)	w/o	Balmain Wanderers (-)
21	FC Eagles Sydney Inc (-)	3–5	All Saints Oatley West (-)
22	Auburn III (-)	1–11	Hurstville City Minotaurs (4)
23	Waverley Old Boys FC (-)	w/o	Enfield (-)
24	Doonside Hawks SC (-)	1–9	Cooma (1)
25	Kellyville Kolts (-)	4–3	Inter Lions II (-)
26	Western Condors (4)	6–2	Belmore Eagles (-)
27	St Augustine's (-)	3–2	Southern Branch (4)
28	Enfield Rovers (4)		Collaroy Cromer Strikers (-)
29	Stanmore Hawks (4)	2–4	Dapto Dandaloo Fury (-)

== Round 2 ==
A total of 32 teams competed, 29 having won in Round 1 and three (Bondi, Randwick City and West Pymble) having received byes in Round 1.

Tie no	Home team (tier)	Score	Away team (tier)
33	Dapto Dandaloo Fury (-)	7–0	Liverpool (-)
34	Western Condors (4)	1–7	Port Kembla (-)
35	Southern Bulls (4)	6–2	Willoughby Dalleys (-)
36	Lilli Pilli (-)	3–1	University of NSW (4)
37	Canberra Olympic (1)	5–0	Auburn (-)
38	Randwick City (-)	1–6	Maroubra United (-)
39	Hurstville City Minotaurs (4)	1–5	Cooma (1)
40	All Saints Oatley West (-)	1–6	Bulli (-)

Tie no	Home team (tier)	Score	Away team (tier)
41	Wollongong United (-)	4–0	Blaxland (-)
42	Padstow United (-)	0–3	Dunbar Rovers (-)
43	Bondi (-)	2–4	West Pymble (-)
44	Mosman (-)	2–1	Bass Hill RSL (-)
45	Parklea (-)	3–2	Waverley Old Boys FC (-)
46	Fairfield City Lions (4)	1–2	Tarrawanna (-)
47	St Augustine's (-)	2–1	Balmain Wanderers (-)
48	Kellyville Kolts (-)	w/o	Collaroy Cromer Strikers (-)

== Round 3 ==
A total of 40 teams competed, 16 of which had progressed from Round 2 along with 24 clubs from the National Premier Leagues NSW 2 and NSW State League Division 1.

Tie no	Home team (tier)	Score	Away team (tier)
49	Hills Brumbies (2)	2–5	Port Kembla (-)
50	Dapto Dandaloo Fury (-)	2–4	Spirit FC (2)
51	Dunbar Rovers (-)	3–1	Balmain (3)
52	Sydney University (2)	2–2	Hakoah Sydney City East (3)
Sydney University advance 4–2 on penalties.
53	Parklea (-)	2–1	Prospect United (3)
54	Kellyville Kolts (-)	0–2	Macarthur Rams (2)
55	Granville Rage (3)	4–2	St Augustine's (-)
56	Parramatta FC (2)	4–0	Inter Lions (3)
57	Bankstown City (2)	1–2	Mounties Wanderers (2)
58	Mt Druitt Town Rangers (2)	4–0	Mosman (-)

Tie no	Home team (tier)	Score	Away team (tier)
59	Wollongong United (-)	3–3	Northbridge (3)
Wollongong United advance on penalties.
60	Northern Tigers (2)	6–1	Gladesville Ryde Magic (3)
61	West Pymble (-)	4–1	Lilli Pilli (-)
62	St George (2)	2–0	Hawkesbury City (3)
63	Cooma (1)	1–4	Bulli (-)
64	Camden Tigers (3)	2–4	Maroubra United (-)
65	Fraser Park (2)	1–0	Dulwich Hill (3)
66	Bankstown Berries (2)	2–0	Tarrawanna (-)
67	Western NSW Mariners (3)	2–1	Canberra Olympic (1)
68	Southern Bulls (4)	3–2	Nepean FC (3)

== Round 4 ==
A total of 32 teams competed, 20 of which had progressed from Round 3 along with 12 clubs from National Premier Leagues NSW.

Tie no	Home team (tier)	Score	Away team (tier)
69	Parramatta FC (2)	3–1	Nepean FC (3)
70	Marconi Stallions (1)	5–0	Fraser Park (2)
71	Central Coast Mariners Academy (1)	4–3	Blacktown City (1)
72	Parklea (-)	0–7	Rockdale City Suns (1)
73	Manly United (1)	1–1	South Coast Wolves (1)
South Coast Wolves advance 5–4 on penalties.
74	Northern Tigers (2)	2–1	Dunbar Rovers (-)
75	Bankstown Berries (2)	1–4	Sydney University (2)
76	Port Kembla (-)	1–2	Granville Rage (3)

Tie no	Home team (tier)	Score	Away team (tier)
77	APIA Leichhardt Tigers (1)	4–0	Maroubra United (-)
78	West Pymble (-)	0–4	St George (2)
79	Mounties Wanderers (2)	2–1	Spirit FC (2)
80	Macarthur Rams (2)	1–3	Sydney Olympic (1)
81	Mt Druitt Town Rangers (2)	2–3	Sutherland Sharks
82	Wollongong United (-)	2–0	Blacktown Spartans (1)
83	Bonnyrigg White Eagles (1)	6–1	Western NSW Mariners (3)
84	Sydney United (1)	2–0	Bulli (-)

== Round of 16 ==
Wollongong United were the lowest ranked team to qualify for this round. They were the only FNSW Grassroots team left in the competition.

Tie no	Home team (tier)	Score	Away team (tier)
85	Rockdale City Suns (1)	3–1	Granville Rage (3)
86	APIA Leichhardt Tigers (1)	2–0	Marconi Stallions (1)
87	Mounties Wanderers (2)	1–1	Central Coast Mariners Academy (1)
Central Coast Mariners Academy advance 6–5 on penalties.
88	Parramatta FC (2)	2–2	St George (2)
St George advance 4–2 on penalties.

Tie no	Home team (tier)	Score	Away team (tier)
89	Sydney Olympic (1)	2–1	Sydney University (2)
90	Northern Tigers (2)	1–1	Sutherland Sharks (1)
Sutherland Sharks advance 8–7 on penalties.
91	Wollongong United (-)	2–1	Sydney United (1)
92	South Coast Wolves (1)	0–1	Bonnyrigg White Eagles (1)

== Quarter-finals ==
Wollongong United were the lowest ranked team to qualify for this round. They were the only FNSW Grassroots team left in the competition.

12 June 2013

Apia Leichhardt Tigers	4–3 (a.e.t.)	Central Coast Mariners Academy
Oswell 32', 52', 56'; Crowell 102' (o.g.)	Report	Crowell 22'; Payne 40' (pen.); Verity 83'

Valentine Sports Park, Sydney
Referee: Chris Young
5 June 2013

Sutherland Sharks	4–3	Sydney Olympic
Elasi 5', 25', 35'; Nikas 68'	Report	Danaskos 59'; Godoy-Bascur 63'; Angel 80'

Seymour Shaw Park, Sydney
Referee: Stephen Lucas
4 July 2013

St George	2–1	Wollongong United
Smith 22'; Messam 35'	Report	Zoric 76' (pen.)

St George Stadium, Sydney
Referee: Khord Yagi
4 June 2013

Bonnyrigg White Eagles	5–2	Rockdale City Suns
Younis 25', 34', 54' (pen.), 64'; Peterson 41'	Report	Burgess 1'; Perri 76'

Bonnyrigg Sports Club, Sydney
Referee: Michael Weiner

== Semi-finals ==
The lowest ranked team qualified for this round was St George. They are the only National Premier Leagues NSW 2 team in the Semi-finals.

19 June 2013

Bonnyrigg White Eagles	2–4 (a.e.t.)	APIA Leichhardt Tigers
Long 60'; Fondyke 69'	Report	Clapham 34'; Oswell 82', 109'; Bartels 96'

Bonnyrigg Sports Club, Sydney
Referee: Adam Susz
19 June 2013

Sutherland Sharks	3–1	St George
Boardman 29'; Nikas 46' (pen.); Elasi 84'	Report	Jovovic 15'

Seymour Shaw Park, Sydney
Referee: Chris Young

== Grand final ==
7 July 2013

Sutherland Sharks	0–3	APIA Leichhardt Tigers
	Report	Oswell 27'; Parisi 65'; Symons 90+3'

Seymour Shaw Park, Sydney
Referee: Chris Young
