= 2011 Football NSW season =

Football New South Wales
- Season: 2011
- Champions: Sydney Olympic

The 2011 Football NSW season was the penultimate season under the previous competition format in New South Wales. The competition consisted of four divisions across the State of New South Wales.

== League Tables ==
=== 2011 NSW Premier League ===
NSW Premier League
- Season: 2011
- Matches: 132
- Goals: 369 (2.8 per match)

The 2011 NSW Premier League season was played over 22 rounds, beginning on 26 March with the regular season concluding on 28 August 2011.

Pos	Team	Pld	W	D	L	GF	GA	GD	Pts	Qualification or relegation
1	Sydney Olympic (C)	22	13	4	5	40	26	+14	43	2011 NSW Premier League Champions
2	Sydney United	22	11	6	5	38	23	+15	39	Qualified for the 2011 NSW Premier League Finals
3	Sutherland Sharks	22	11	5	6	31	28	+3	38	Qualified for the 2011 NSW Premier League Finals
4	Blacktown City	22	11	4	7	35	22	+13	37	Qualified for the 2011 NSW Premier League Finals
5	Bonnyrigg White Eagles	22	8	9	5	33	24	+9	33	Qualified for the 2011 NSW Premier League Finals
6	Manly United	22	8	7	7	33	37	−4	31	
7	South Coast Wolves	22	9	3	10	35	36	−1	30	
8	Rockdale City Suns	22	8	4	10	23	29	−6	28	
9	Marconi Stallions	22	6	8	8	28	25	+3	26	
10	APIA Leichhardt Tigers	22	6	5	11	24	36	−12	23	
11	Bankstown City (R)	22	6	3	13	30	47	−17	21	Relegated to the 2012 NSW Super League
12	Parramatta FC	22	4	4	14	19	36	−17	16	

Source: http://www.socceraust.co.uk/2011/NSW/PL/fixtures.html
Rules for classification: 1) points; 2) goal difference; 3) number of goals scored.
(C) Champions; (R) Relegated

=== 2011 NSW Super League ===
NSW Super League
- Season: 2011
- Matches: 130
- Goals: 417 (3.21 per match)

The 2011 NSW Super League season was played over 22 rounds, beginning on 12 March with the regular season concluding on 14 August 2011.

Pos	Team	Pld	W	D	L	GF	GA	GD	Pts	Qualification or relegation
1	Blacktown Spartans (C, P)	21	13	1	7	36	29	+7	40	Promoted to the 2012 NSW Premier League
2	West Sydney Berries	22	10	8	4	52	28	+24	38	Qualified for the 2011 NSW Super League Finals
3	St George	22	11	4	7	36	26	+10	37	Qualified for the 2011 NSW Super League Finals
4	Macarthur Rams	22	10	5	7	40	27	+13	35	Qualified for the 2011 NSW Super League Finals
5	Granville Rage	22	10	5	7	31	31	0	35	Qualified for the 2011 NSW Super League Finals
6	Northern Tigers	22	8	8	6	32	27	+5	32	
7	Spirit FC	22	9	4	9	42	43	−1	31	
8	Sydney University	21	7	6	8	33	37	−4	27	
9	Fraser Park	21	7	3	11	30	41	−11	24	
10	Dulwich Hill	22	6	6	10	28	39	−11	24	
11	Central Coast FC	22	5	7	10	28	36	−8	22	Withdrew at end of the season
12	Hills United	21	3	5	13	29	53	−24	14	

(C) Champions; (P) Promoted

^{NB} Two matches were postponed and subsequently couldn't be played.

=== 2011 NSW State League Division 1 ===
NSW State League Division 1
- Season: 2011
- Matches: 132
- Goals: 436 (3.3 per match)

The 2011 NSW State League Division 1 season was played over 22 rounds, beginning on 19 March with the regular season concluding on 21 August 2011.

Pos	Team	Pld	W	D	L	GF	GA	GD	Pts	Qualification or relegation
1	Mounties Wanderers (P, C)	22	19	1	2	63	13	+50	58	Promoted to the 2012 NSW Super League
2	Fairfield City Lions	22	12	4	6	53	45	+8	40	Qualified for the 2011 NSW State League Division 1 Finals
3	Gladesville Ryde Magic	22	11	4	7	35	25	+10	37	Qualified for the 2011 NSW State League Division 1 Finals
4	Camden Tigers	22	10	3	9	37	34	+3	33	Qualified for the 2011 NSW State League Division 1 Finals
5	University of NSW	22	9	6	7	29	35	−6	33	Qualified for the 2011 NSW State League Division 1 Finals
6	Fairfield Bulls	22	9	3	10	34	38	−4	30	Withdrew at end of the season, then merged to become Southern Bulls
7	Mt Druitt Town Rangers	22	6	8	8	38	37	+1	26	
8	Hurstville FC	22	7	4	11	24	45	−21	25	
9	Balmain SC	22	7	3	12	35	38	−3	24	
10	Stanmore Hawks	22	6	6	10	34	40	−6	24	
11	Schofield Scorpions	22	4	8	10	24	34	−10	20	
12	Inter Lions	22	5	4	13	30	52	−22	19	

(C) Champions; (P) Promoted

=== 2011 NSW State League Division 2 ===
NSW State League Division 2
- Season: 2011
- Matches: 180
- Goals: 650 (3.61 per match)

The 2011 NSW State League Division 2 season was played over 22 rounds, beginning on 12 March with the regular season concluding on 28 August 2011.

Pos	Team	Pld	W	D	L	GF	GA	GD	Pts	Qualification or relegation
1	Northbridge FC (P)	26	17	5	4	71	36	+35	56	Promoted to the 2012 NSW State League Division 1
2	Hakoah FC (C)	26	16	5	5	67	34	+33	53	Qualified for the 2011 NSW State League Division 2 Finals
3	Roosters FC	26	17	1	8	66	42	+24	52	Qualified for the 2011 NSW State League Division 2 Finals
4	Luddenham United	26	17	1	8	62	50	+12	52	Qualified for the 2011 NSW State League Division 2 Finals
5	Prospect United	26	16	2	8	55	28	+27	50	Qualified for the 2011 NSW State League Division 2 Finals
6	Hawkesbury City	25	11	7	7	47	39	+8	40	
7	Springwood United	25	10	6	9	47	38	+9	36	
8	Fairfield Wanderers	25	9	6	10	35	38	−3	33	Withdrew at end of the season
9	Chopin Park Rams	26	8	7	11	32	40	−8	31	
10	Hurstville City Minotaurs	25	9	2	14	42	59	−17	29	
11	Belmore Hercules	26	5	9	12	35	57	−22	24	
12	Nepean FC	26	5	7	14	26	55	−29	22	
13	Bathurst 75	26	6	2	18	36	53	−17	20	
14	FC Gazy Lansvale	26	2	4	20	29	81	−52	10	

(C) Champions; (P) Promoted

^{NB} Two matches were postponed and subsequently couldn't be played.
