= 2012 Football NSW season =

Football New South Wales
- Season: 2012
- Champions: Marconi Stallions

The Football NSW 2012 season was the final season under the previous competition format in New South Wales. The competition consisted of four divisions across the State of New South Wales.

== League Tables ==
=== 2012 NSW Premier League ===
NSW Premier League
- Season: 2012
- Champions: Marconi Stallions
- Premiers: Bonnyrigg White Eagles
- Relegated: Parramatta Eagles
- Matches: 132
- Goals: 394 (2.98 per match)

The 2012 NSW Premier League season was played over 22 rounds, beginning on 31 March with the regular season concluding on 2 September 2012.

Pos	Team	Pld	W	D	L	GF	GA	GD	Pts	Qualification or relegation
1	Bonnyrigg White Eagles	22	17	2	3	50	17	+33	53	2012 NSW Premier League Finals
2	Sydney Olympic	22	11	5	6	37	26	+11	38	2012 NSW Premier League Finals
3	Marconi Stallions (C)	22	12	2	8	32	28	+4	38	2012 NSW Premier League Finals
4	South Coast Wolves	22	12	1	9	41	39	+2	37	2012 NSW Premier League Finals
5	Blacktown City	22	9	5	8	40	34	+6	32	2012 NSW Premier League Finals
6	APIA Leichhardt Tigers	22	9	4	9	32	31	+1	31	
7	Rockdale City Suns	22	9	3	10	30	33	−3	30	
8	Sutherland Sharks	22	8	5	9	34	36	−2	29	
9	Sydney United 58	22	7	4	11	27	38	−11	25	
10	Manly United	22	6	5	11	26	33	−7	23	
11	Blacktown Spartans	22	6	3	13	26	44	−18	21	
12	Parramatta Eagles (R)	22	4	5	13	19	35	−16	17	Relegated to the 2013 National Premier League NSW Men's 2

(C) Champions; (R) Relegated

==== Finals ====
Qualifying Final
2	Sydney Olympic	0
3	Marconi Stallions	2
4	South Coast Wolves	1
5	Blacktown City	2

Major Semi-Final
1	Bonnyrigg White Eagles	1
3	Marconi Stallions	0
Minor Semi-Final
2	Sydney Olympic	0
5	Blacktown City	1

Preliminary final
3	Marconi Stallions	4
5	Blacktown City	2

Grand Final
1	Bonnyrigg White Eagles	0
3	Marconi Stallions	2

=== 2012 NSW Super League ===
NSW Super League
- Season: 2012
- Champions: Northern Tigers
- Relegated: Dulwich Hill
- Matches: 132
- Goals: 437 (3.31 per match)

The 2012 NSW Super League season was played over 22 rounds, beginning on 17 March with the regular season concluding on 19 August 2012.

Pos	Team	Pld	W	D	L	GF	GA	GD	Pts	Qualification or relegation
1	Northern Tigers (C)	22	16	4	2	48	16	+32	52	Qualified for the 2012 NSW Super League Finals
2	Bankstown City	22	15	3	4	53	29	+24	48	Qualified for the 2012 NSW Super League Finals
3	Bankstown Berries	22	13	5	4	52	29	+23	44	Qualified for the 2012 NSW Super League Finals
4	Mounties Wanderers	22	9	5	8	33	28	+5	32	Qualified for the 2012 NSW Super League Finals
5	Macarthur Rams	22	7	10	5	32	26	+6	31	Qualified for the 2012 NSW Super League Finals
6	Granville Rage	22	9	2	11	30	42	−12	29	
7	St George	22	6	8	8	39	40	−1	26	
8	Hills United	22	7	2	13	40	59	−19	23	
9	Fraser Park	22	6	5	11	22	44	−22	23	
10	Spirit FC	22	6	4	12	31	33	−2	22	
11	Sydney University	22	6	4	12	27	41	−14	22	
12	Dulwich Hill (R)	22	5	2	15	30	50	−20	17	Relegated to the 2013 NSW State League Division 1

(C) Champions; (R) Relegated

==== Finals ====
Qualifying Final
2	Bankstown City	1 (5)
3	Bankstown Berries	1 (4)
4	Mounties Wanderers	1
5	Macarthur Rams	3

Major Semi-Final
1	Northern Tigers	3
2	Bankstown City	1
Minor Semi-Final
3	Bankstown Berries	2
5	Macarthur Rams	1

Preliminary final
2	Bankstown City	1
3	Bankstown Berries	4

Grand Final
1	Northern Tigers	1 (5)
3	Bankstown Berries	1 (4)

=== 2012 NSW State League Division 1 ===
NSW State League Division 1
- Season: 2012
- Champions: Gladesville Ryde Magic
- Matches: 132
- Goals: 465 (3.52 per match)

The 2012 NSW State League Division 1 season was played over 22 rounds, beginning on 17 March with the regular season concluding on 19 August 2012.

Pos	Team	Pld	W	D	L	GF	GA	GD	Pts	Qualification or relegation
1	Gladesville Ryde Magic (C)	22	14	6	2	36	17	+19	48	Qualified for the 2012 NSW State League Division 1 Finals
2	Mt Druitt Town Rangers (P)	22	12	5	5	68	36	+32	41	Promoted to the 2013 National Premier League NSW Men's 2
3	Inter Lions	22	11	7	4	43	26	+17	40	Qualified for the 2012 NSW State League Division 1 Finals
4	Northbridge FC	22	11	2	9	55	39	+16	35	Qualified for the 2012 NSW State League Division 1 Finals
5	Balmain Tigers	22	9	7	6	32	26	+6	34	Qualified for the 2012 NSW State League Division 1 Finals
6	Camden Tigers	22	8	6	8	23	27	−4	30	
7	University of NSW (R)	22	9	2	11	42	46	−4	29	Relegated to the 2013 NSW State League Division 2
8	Stanmore Hawks (R)	22	7	7	8	34	27	+7	28	Relegated to the 2013 NSW State League Division 2
9	Schofield Scorpions (R)	22	8	4	10	40	40	0	28	Relegated to the 2013 NSW State League Division 2
10	Fairfield City Lions (R)	22	6	5	11	36	56	−20	23	Relegated to the 2013 NSW State League Division 2
11	Southern Bulls (R)	22	6	1	15	35	57	−22	19	Relegated to the 2013 NSW State League Division 2
12	Hurstville FC (R)	22	3	4	15	21	68	−47	13	Relegated to the 2013 NSW State League Division 2

(C) Champions; (P) Promoted; (R) Relegated

==== Finals ====
Qualifying Final
2	Mt Druitt Town Rangers	2
3	Inter Lions	0
4	Northbridge FC	1
5	Balmain Tigers (a.e.t.)	3

Major Semi-Final
1	Gladesville Ryde Magic	0
2	Mt Druitt Town Rangers	3
Minor Semi-Final
3	Inter Lions	0
5	Balmain Tigers	1

Preliminary final
1	Gladesville Ryde Magic	3
5	Balmain Tigers	1

Grand Final
1	Gladesville Ryde Magic	2
2	Mt Druitt Town Rangers	0

=== 2012 NSW State League Division 2 ===
NSW State League Division 2
- Season: 2012
- Champions: Hakoah FC
- Promoted: Hakoah FC; Prospect United; Hawkesbury City; Nepean FC
- Matches: 132
- Goals: 483 (3.66 per match)

The 2012 NSW State League Division 2 season was played over 22 rounds, beginning on 17 March with the regular season concluding on 19 August 2012.

Pos	Team	Pld	W	D	L	GF	GA	GD	Pts	Qualification or relegation
1	Hakoah FC (C, P)	22	19	2	1	87	15	+72	59	Promoted to the 2013 NSW State League Division 1
2	Prospect United (P)	22	12	4	6	46	24	+22	40	Promoted to the 2013 NSW State League Division 1
3	Hawkesbury City (P)	22	11	5	6	46	24	+22	38	Promoted to the 2013 NSW State League Division 1
4	Mountains United	22	12	1	9	41	33	+8	37	Qualified for the 2012 NSW State League Division 2 Finals
5	Hurstville City Minotaurs	22	9	5	8	40	47	−7	32	Qualified for the 2012 NSW State League Division 2 Finals
6	Bathurst 75	22	9	2	11	33	38	−5	29	Team not granted a licence for 2013 season
7	Luddenham United	22	7	6	9	39	46	−7	27	Team not granted a licence for 2013 season
8	Western Condors	22	7	6	9	29	36	−7	27	
9	West City	22	7	5	10	29	46	−17	26	Team not granted a licence for 2013 season
10	Belmore United	22	5	5	12	31	52	−21	20	
11	FC Gazy Lansvale	22	4	6	12	31	66	−35	18	Team not granted a licence for 2013 season
12	Nepean FC (P)	22	4	5	13	25	50	−25	17	Promoted to the 2013 NSW State League Division 1 (Note: Promoted as a result of league restructuring by Football NSW.)

(C) Champions; (P) Promoted

==== Finals ====
Qualifying Final
2	Prospect United	1
3	Hawkesbury City	2
4	Mountains United	2
5	Hurstville City Minotaurs	1

Major Semi-Final
1	Hakoah FC	5
3	Hawkesbury City	0
Minor Semi-Final
2	Prospect United (a.e.t.)	1
4	Mountains United	0

Preliminary final
2	Prospect United	1
3	Hawkesbury City	0

Grand Final
1	Hakoah FC	1
2	Prospect United	0
