= List of North West Sydney Spirit FC seasons =

North West Sydney Spirit Football Club is an Australian semi-professional association football club based in Newcastle. The club was formed in 1998 as Northern Spirit and joined the National Soccer League in the 1998–99 and became defunct in 2004. They were re-formed later in 2004 as GHFA Spirit who was selected along with 11 other teams to join the new second division of soccer in New South Wales. The club's first team spent eight seasons in the National Soccer League. The table details the club's achievements in major competitions, and the top scorers for each season.

== History ==
North West Sydney Spirit's first season started in the National Soccer League in 1998–99 as Northern Spirit, finishing 5th of 15 and reaching the elimination-finals. The next three seasons were failures to qualify for the Finals series, until the change of the Finals series to the Championship play-offs in the NSL which the club qualified for in the 2002–03 season finishing 5th out of 6. The final season of the NSL in 2003–04 for Northern Spirit had them finish 7th slightly missing on the return of the Finals series for the last time. The club moved to state league football from the 2005 season onwards moving into the NSW Division One, the third tier of football in New South Wales at the time. They won their first trophy in 2007 winning the Division One championship while also being promoted to the Super League in 2008. The 2009 season had seen them win three consecutive championships. It would be another five seasons before finishing 1st until the 2015 season. They qualified for the Australia Cup Final Rounds for the first time in the 2022 season.

== Key ==
Key to league competitions:

- National Soccer League (NSL) – Australia's former top football league, established in 1977 and dissolved in 2004.
- NSW League One (League One) – The second tier of football in New South Wales

Key to colours and symbols:

1st or W	Winners
2nd or RU	Runners-up
3rd	Third place
♦	Top scorer in division

Key to league record:

- Season = The year and article of the season
- Pos = Final position
- Pld = Matches played
- W = Matches won
- D = Matches drawn
- L = Matches lost
- GF = Goals scored
- GA = Goals against
- Pts = Points

== Seasons ==
Results of league and cup competitions by season
Season	Division	Pld	W	D	L	GF	GA	Pts	Pos	Finals	Australia Cup	State Cup	Name(s)	Goals
Season	League									Finals	Australia Cup	State Cup	Top goalscorer(s)	
1998–99	NSL	28	14	4	10	36	35	46	5th	EF	—	—	Kresimir Marusic	8
1999–2000	NSL	34	11	3	20	41	58	36	13th	DNQ	—	—	David Seal	9
2000–01	NSL	30	8	8	14	39	50	32	13th	DNQ	—	—	Ben Burgess	16
2001–02	NSL	24	9	7	8	36	39	34	8th	DNQ	—	—	Pablo Cardozo	14
2002–03	NSL	24	11	3	10	37	44	36	6th	5th	—	—	Vuko Tomasevic	8
2003–04	NSL	24	9	3	12	31	33	30	7th	DNQ	—	—	Stewart Petrie	7
2005	Div 1	24	10	5	9	30	39	35	8th	DNQ	—	R1		
2006	Div 1	26	16	3	7	70	25	51	5th	Minor SF	—	R3		
2007	Div 1	26	18	4	4	72	32	58	2nd	W	—	R3		
2008	Div 1 ↑	22	17	4	1	67	23	55	1st	W	—	R4		
2009	Super League	22	17	4	1	67	23	55	3rd	W	—	R4		
2010	Super League	22	10	3	9	33	36	33	4th	Minor SF	—	RU		
2011	Super League	22	9	4	9	42	43	31	7th	DNQ	—	R2		
2012	Super League	22	6	4	12	31	33	22	10th	DNQ	—	R4		
2013	NPL 2	22	9	6	7	28	29	33	6th	DNQ	—	R4		
2014	NPL 2	22	7	4	11	39	40	25	8th	DNQ	PR4	R4		
2015	NPL 2	22	16	3	3	50	16	51	1st	PF	PR5	—		
2016	NPL 2	26	9	3	14	43	52	30	11th	DNQ	PR4	—		
2017	NPL 2	26	10	5	11	39	45	35	9th	DNQ	PR4	—		
2018	NPL 2	26	11	5	10	45	45	38	7th	DNQ	PR7	R7		
2019	NPL 2	26	13	4	9	48	44	43	5th	Elim SF	PR4	—		
2020	NPL 2	10	7	1	2	26	18	22	2nd	SF	—	—		
2021	NPL 2	16	8	3	5	37	23	27	6th	DNQ	PR6	—		
2022	League One ↑	22	10	3	9	40	35	33	4th	QF	R32	W		
