= 2014 Football NSW season =

Football New South Wales
- Season: 2014
- Champions: Blacktown City

The Football NSW 2014 season was the second season under the new competition format for state-level football (soccer) in New South Wales. The competition consisted of four divisions across the State of New South Wales. The overall premier for the new structure qualified for the National Premier Leagues finals series, competing with the other state federation champions in a final knockout tournament to decide the National Premier Leagues Champion for 2014.

== League Tables ==
=== 2014 National Premier League NSW Men's 1 ===
NPL NSW Men's 1
- Season: 2014
- Champions: Blacktown City
- Premiers: Bonnyrigg White Eagles
- Relegated: St George
- Matches: 132
- Goals: 416 (3.15 per match)
- Top goalscorer: Robert Younis (17 goals)
- Biggest home win: Blacktown Spartans 6–0 St George (3 May 2014)
- Biggest away win: Blacktown Spartans 0–7 Blacktown City (17 August 2014)
- Highest scoring: Sutherland Sharks 4-5 APIA Leichhardt (28 June 2014)

The National Premier League New South Wales 2014 season was played over 22 rounds, from March to August 2014.

| Pos | Team | Pld | W | D | L | GF | GA | GD | Pts | Qualification or relegation |
|---|---|---|---|---|---|---|---|---|---|---|
| 1 | Bonnyrigg White Eagles | 22 | 15 | 2 | 5 | 41 | 21 | +20 | 47 | Qualified for the 2014 National Premier Leagues Finals |
| 2 | Blacktown Spartans | 22 | 15 | 1 | 6 | 55 | 34 | +21 | 46 | Qualified for the 2014 NSW Finals |
| 3 | Blacktown City (C) | 22 | 14 | 2 | 6 | 51 | 22 | +29 | 44 | Qualified for the 2014 NSW Finals |
| 4 | Sydney Olympic | 22 | 10 | 5 | 7 | 35 | 27 | +8 | 35 | Qualified for the 2014 NSW Finals |
| 5 | Rockdale City Suns | 22 | 10 | 4 | 8 | 26 | 24 | +2 | 34 | Qualified for the 2014 NSW Finals |
| 6 | Sutherland Sharks | 22 | 9 | 3 | 10 | 43 | 42 | +1 | 30 | |
| 7 | South Coast Wolves | 22 | 7 | 6 | 9 | 32 | 35 | −3 | 27 | |
| 8 | Marconi Stallions | 22 | 7 | 4 | 11 | 28 | 36 | −8 | 25 | |
| 9 | Sydney United 58 | 22 | 6 | 6 | 10 | 25 | 29 | −4 | 24 | |
| 10 | Manly United | 22 | 7 | 3 | 12 | 31 | 46 | −15 | 24 | |
| 11 | APIA Leichhardt Tigers | 22 | 4 | 8 | 10 | 31 | 51 | −20 | 20 | |
| 12 | St George (R) | 22 | 4 | 4 | 14 | 18 | 49 | −31 | 16 | Relegated to the 2015 NPL NSW 2 |

Source: foxsportspulse.com
Rules for classification: 1) points; 2) goal difference; 3) number of goals scored.
(C) Champions; (R) Relegated

==== Results ====
| Home \ Away | API | BLC | BLS | BWE | MAN | MAR | ROC | SCW | STG | SUT | SYO | SYU |
|---|---|---|---|---|---|---|---|---|---|---|---|---|
| APIA Leichhardt Tigers | | 1–5 | 1–2 | 2–3 | 2–2 | 0–2 | 0–0 | 0–0 | 3–1 | 2–2 | 1–3 | 1–1 |
| Blacktown City | 3–3 | | 2–1 | 4–1 | 2–1 | 0–1 | 0–2 | 3–0 | 2–0 | 1–0 | 0–1 | 0–0 |
| Blacktown Spartans | 1–3 | 0–7 | | 3–2 | 4–1 | 0–1 | 0–2 | 3–3 | 6–0 | 6–1 | 0–1 | 1–0 |
| Bonnyrigg White Eagles | 4–0 | 1–0 | 2–3 | | 3–0 | 4–0 | 0–2 | 2–2 | 3–0 | 1–0 | 1–0 | 2–1 |
| Manly United | 1–1 | 3–1 | 3–0 | 0–3 | | 0–1 | 0–1 | 1–0 | 4–0 | 0–4 | 2–2 | 1–0 |
| Marconi Stallions | 1–0 | 0–4 | 2–3 | 1–2 | 3–0 | | 0–1 | 1–1 | 1–2 | 1–2 | 1–2 | 1–1 |
| Rockdale City Suns | 0–2 | 2–4 | 0–1 | 0–1 | 1–3 | 1–1 | | 1–0 | 1–0 | 3–0 | 1–0 | 0–0 |
| South Coast Wolves | 5–1 | 0–5 | 0–3 | 0–1 | 6–1 | 4–1 | 3–1 | | 0–2 | 1–0 | 1–1 | 1–0 |
| St George FC | 2–2 | 0–2 | 1–6 | 1–1 | 4–3 | 0–2 | 1–4 | 0–2 | | 0–3 | 0–0 | 0–0 |
| Sutherland Sharks | 4–5 | 3–4 | 1–2 | 1–3 | 3–1 | 3–2 | 0–0 | 2–1 | 2–1 | | 2–3 | 4–0 |
| Sydney Olympic | 6–1 | 1–2 | 1–3 | 0–1 | 3–1 | 2–2 | 2–1 | 1–1 | 0–2 | 2–3 | | 2–1 |
| Sydney United | 3–0 | 1–0 | 1–0 | 1–0 | 2–3 | 2–3 | 1–3 | 5–1 | 2–1 | 3–3 | 0–2 | |

Source: socceraust.co.uk
Legend: Blue = home team win; Yellow = draw; Red = away team win.

==== Finals ====
Qualifying final
2 | Blacktown Spartans | 0
3 | Blacktown City | 3
4 | Sydney Olympic | 2
5 | Rockdale City Suns | 1

Major semi-final
1 | Bonnyrigg White Eagles | 0
3 | Blacktown City | 1
Minor semi-final
2 | Blacktown Spartans | 0
4 | Sydney Olympic | 3

Preliminary final
1 | Bonnyrigg White Eagles | 1 (5)
4 | Sydney Olympic | 1 (6)

Grand final
3 | Blacktown City | 2
4 | Sydney Olympic | 1

=== 2014 National Premier League NSW Men's 2 ===
NPL NSW Men's 2
- Season: 2014
- Champions: Macarthur Rams
- Premiers: Parramatta FC
- Promoted: Parramatta FC
- Matches: 132
- Goals: 403 (3.05 per match)

The 2014 National Premier League NSW Men's 2 was the second edition of the new NPL NSW 2 as the second level domestic association football competition in New South Wales. 12 teams competed, all playing each other twice for a total of 22 rounds, with the top team at the end of the year being promoted to the NPL NSW Men's 1 competition.

| Pos | Team | Pld | W | D | L | GF | GA | GD | Pts | Qualification or relegation |
|---|---|---|---|---|---|---|---|---|---|---|
| 1 | Parramatta FC (P) | 22 | 13 | 7 | 2 | 42 | 23 | +19 | 46 | Promoted to the 2015 NPL NSW Men's 1 |
| 2 | Central Coast Mariners Academy | 22 | 10 | 7 | 5 | 30 | 25 | +5 | 37 | Qualified for the 2014 NPL NSW Men's 2 Finals |
| 3 | Macarthur Rams (C) | 22 | 10 | 6 | 6 | 41 | 28 | +13 | 36 | Qualified for the 2014 NPL NSW Men's 2 Finals |
| 4 | Northern Tigers | 22 | 10 | 6 | 6 | 35 | 27 | +8 | 36 | Qualified for the 2014 NPL NSW Men's 2 Finals |
| 5 | Mounties Wanderers | 22 | 9 | 5 | 8 | 35 | 33 | +2 | 32 | Qualified for the 2014 NPL NSW Men's 2 Finals |
| 6 | Sydney University | 22 | 8 | 7 | 7 | 32 | 35 | −3 | 31 | |
| 7 | Bankstown City | 22 | 6 | 10 | 6 | 36 | 37 | −1 | 28 | |
| 8 | Spirit FC | 22 | 7 | 4 | 11 | 39 | 40 | −1 | 25 | |
| 9 | Hills United (R) | 22 | 6 | 6 | 10 | 32 | 37 | −5 | 24 | Relegated to the 2015 NSW State League Division 1 |
| 10 | Bankstown Berries | 22 | 7 | 2 | 13 | 32 | 45 | −13 | 23 | |
| 11 | Fraser Park | 22 | 4 | 9 | 9 | 26 | 35 | −9 | 21 | |
| 12 | Mt Druitt Town Rangers | 22 | 6 | 3 | 13 | 23 | 38 | −15 | 21 | |

Source: https://websites.sportstg.com/comp_info.cgi?c=1-10179-0-296017-0&pool=1001&a=LADDER
(C) Champions; (P) Promoted; (R) Relegated

==== Finals ====
Qualifying final
2 | CCMA | 0
3 | Macarthur Rams | 1
4 | Northern Tigers | 2
5 | Mounties Wanderers | 0

Major semi-final
1 | Parramatta FC | 1
3 | Macarthur Rams | 2
Minor semi-final
2 | CCMA | 0
4 | Northern Tigers | 5

Preliminary final
1 | Parramatta FC | 2
4 | Northern Tigers | 0

Grand final
1 | Parramatta FC | 1
3 | Macarthur Rams | 2

=== 2014 NSW State League Division 1 ===
NSW State League Division 1
- Season: 2014
- Champions: Hakoah Sydney City East
- Matches: 132
- Goals: 500 (3.79 per match)

The 2014 NSW State League Division 1 was the second edition of the State League to be incorporated under the National Premier Leagues banner. 12 teams competed, all playing each other twice for a total of 22 rounds.

| Pos | Team | Pld | W | D | L | GF | GA | GD | Pts | Qualification or relegation |
|---|---|---|---|---|---|---|---|---|---|---|
| 1 | Hakoah Sydney City East (C, P) | 22 | 16 | 5 | 1 | 68 | 23 | +45 | 53 | Promoted to the 2015 NPL NSW 2 |
| 2 | Northbridge FC | 21 | 12 | 4 | 5 | 56 | 37 | +19 | 40 | Qualified for the 2014 NSW State League Division 1 Finals |
| 3 | Granville Rage | 22 | 11 | 5 | 6 | 49 | 39 | +10 | 38 | Qualified for the 2014 NSW State League Division 1 Finals |
| 4 | Gladesville Ryde Magic | 22 | 11 | 5 | 6 | 40 | 37 | +3 | 38 | Qualified for the 2014 NSW State League Division 1 Finals |
| 5 | Balmain Tigers | 22 | 10 | 5 | 7 | 46 | 38 | +8 | 35 | Qualified for the 2014 NSW State League Division 1 Finals |
| 6 | Hawkesbury City | 22 | 9 | 4 | 9 | 51 | 47 | +4 | 31 | |
| 7 | Dulwich Hill | 22 | 9 | 4 | 9 | 37 | 42 | −5 | 31 | |
| 8 | Stanmore Hawks | 22 | 5 | 8 | 9 | 46 | 54 | −8 | 23 | |
| 9 | Nepean FC | 22 | 6 | 5 | 11 | 30 | 43 | −13 | 23 | |
| 10 | Western NSW Mariners | 22 | 5 | 5 | 12 | 28 | 51 | −23 | 20 | |
| 11 | Camden Tigers (R) | 22 | 4 | 6 | 12 | 20 | 38 | −18 | 18 | Relegated to 2015 NSW State League Division 2 |
| 12 | Inter Lions | 21 | 5 | 0 | 16 | 29 | 51 | −22 | 15 | |

(C) Champions; (P) Promoted; (R) Relegated

^{NB}The final round match between Northbridge FC and Inter Lions was not played, as it had been postponed and had no effect on the finals series.

==== Finals ====
Qualifying final
2 | Northbridge FC | 2
3 | Granville Rage | 0
4 | Gladesville Ryde Magic | 0
5 | Balmain Tigers | 2

Major semi-final
1 | Hakoah Sydney City East | 2
2 | Northbridge FC | 1
Minor semi-final
3 | Granville Rage | 0
5 | Balmain Tigers | 4

Preliminary final
2 | Northbridge FC | 3
5 | Balmain Tigers | 1

Grand final
1 | Hakoah Sydney City East | 3
2 | Northbridge FC | 2

=== 2014 NSW State League Division 2 ===
NSW State League Division 2
- Season: 2014
- Champions: Rydalmere Lions
- Matches: 72
- Goals: 235 (3.26 per match)

The 2014 NSW State League Division 2 was the second edition of the State League to be incorporated under the National Premier Leagues banner. 9 teams competed, all playing each other twice for a total of 16 matches.

| Pos | Team | Pld | W | D | L | GF | GA | GD | Pts | Qualification or relegation |
|---|---|---|---|---|---|---|---|---|---|---|
| 1 | Hurstville FC | 16 | 11 | 3 | 2 | 30 | 14 | +16 | 36 | Qualified for the 2014 NSW State League Division 2 Finals |
| 2 | Southern Bulls | 16 | 8 | 6 | 2 | 32 | 11 | +21 | 30 | Qualified for the 2014 NSW State League Division 2 Finals |
| 3 | Prospect United | 16 | 9 | 3 | 4 | 33 | 17 | +16 | 30 | Qualified for the 2014 NSW State League Division 2 Finals |
| 4 | Rydalmere Lions (C, P) | 16 | 9 | 2 | 5 | 36 | 16 | +20 | 29 | Promoted to the 2015 NSW State League Division 1 |
| 5 | Western Condors | 16 | 7 | 3 | 6 | 18 | 19 | −1 | 24 | |
| 6 | Hurstville City Minotaurs | 16 | 6 | 4 | 6 | 23 | 31 | −8 | 22 | |
| 7 | Enfield Rovers | 16 | 4 | 3 | 9 | 27 | 36 | −9 | 15 | Team withdrew at end of season |
| 8 | Southern Branch | 16 | 3 | 1 | 12 | 22 | 37 | −15 | 10 | Team withdrew at end of season |
| 9 | University of NSW | 16 | 2 | 1 | 13 | 14 | 54 | −40 | 7 | |

(C) Champions; (P) Promoted

==== Finals ====
Semi-finals
1 | Hurstville FC | 3
2 | Southern Bulls | 4
3 | Prospect United | 1
4 | Rydalmere Lions | 2

Preliminary final
1 | Hurstville FC | 1
4 | Rydalmere Lions | 2

Grand final
2 | Southern Bulls | 1
4 | Rydalmere Lions | 2

=== 2014 National Premier Leagues NSW Women's 1 ===
National Premier Leagues NSW Women's 1
- Season: 2014
- Champions: Football NSW Institute
- Premiers: Macarthur Rams

The 2014 National Premier League NSW Women's 1 was the first edition of the new NPL NSW Women's competition to be incorporated under the National Premier Leagues banner. 9 teams competed, all playing each other three times for a total of 27 rounds.

| Pos | Team | Pld | W | D | L | GF | GA | GD | Pts | Qualification or relegation |
|---|---|---|---|---|---|---|---|---|---|---|
| 1 | Macarthur Rams | 24 | 17 | 1 | 6 | 67 | 42 | +25 | 52 | Qualification for the 2014 NPL NSW Women's Finals |
| 2 | North West Sydney Koalas | 24 | 14 | 4 | 6 | 60 | 31 | +29 | 46 | Qualification for the 2014 NPL NSW Women's Finals |
| 3 | Football NSW Institute (C) | 24 | 13 | 2 | 9 | 48 | 41 | +7 | 41 | Qualification for the 2014 NPL NSW Women's Finals |
| 4 | Sydney University | 24 | 13 | 1 | 10 | 50 | 29 | +21 | 40 | Qualification for the 2014 NPL NSW Women's Finals |
| 5 | Illawarra Stingrays | 24 | 13 | 1 | 10 | 65 | 46 | +19 | 40 | |
| 6 | Manly United | 24 | 10 | 3 | 11 | 35 | 43 | −8 | 33 | |
| 7 | North Shore Mariners | 24 | 8 | 1 | 15 | 36 | 65 | −29 | 25 | |
| 8 | Marconi Stallions (R) | 24 | 5 | 6 | 13 | 31 | 59 | −28 | 21 | Relegation to 2015 NPL NSW Women's 2 competition |
| 9 | Blacktown Spartans | 24 | 3 | 5 | 16 | 23 | 59 | −36 | 14 | |

Source: sportstg.com
Rules for classification: 1) points; 2) goal difference; 3) number of goals scored.
(C) Champions; (R) Relegated

==== Finals ====
Semi-finals
1 | Macarthur Rams | 5
2 | North West Sydney Koalas | 1
3 | Football NSW Institute | 3
4 | Sydney University | 1

Preliminary final
North West Sydney Koalas | 2
Football NSW Institute | 3

Grand final
Macarthur Rams | 2
Football NSW Institute | 4

== 2014 Waratah Cup ==
Football NSW soccer clubs competed in 2014 for the Waratah Cup. The tournament doubled as the NSW qualifier for the 2014 FFA Cup, with the top seven clubs progressing to the Round of 32. 100 clubs entered the qualifying phase, with the clubs entering in a staggered format (with NPL and NPL 2 clubs seeded to a later round). The four quarter-final winners were randomly drawn to create the semi-final fixtures of the competition.

The competition was won by Blacktown City, their 4th title, defeating Manly United by six goals to two.

In addition to the three A-League clubs (Central Coast Mariners, Sydney FC and Western Sydney Wanderers), seven qualifiers (Blacktown City, Hakoah Sydney City East, Manly United, Parramatta FC, Sydney Olympic, Sydney United 58 and South Coast Wolves) competed in the final rounds of the 2014 FFA Cup. Of these qualifying clubs, only Sydney Olympic and Sydney United 58 progressed to the Round of 16.

== Awards ==
The end of year awards were presented at Rosehill Gardens on 12 September 2014.

=== National Premier Leagues NSW ===
| Award | Men's | Women's |
|---|---|---|
| Player of the Year | Travis Major (Blacktown City) | Renee Rollason (Macarthur Rams) |
| Golden Boot | Robert Younis (Bonnyrigg White Eagles) – 17 goals | Michelle Carney (Illawarra Stingrays) |
| Coach of the Year | Mark Crittenden (Blacktown City) | Heather Garriock (Sydney University) |
| Goalkeeper of the Year | Matthew Nash (Bonnyrigg White Eagles) | Alyssa Harris (Manly United) |
| Goal of the Year | Dom Ferguson (Manly United) | — |
| Referee of the Year | Steven Lucas | Kelly Jones |
| U-20's Golden Boot | James Andrew (Sydney Olympic) | Demi Koulizakis (FNSW Institute) |
| U-20's Player of the Year | Toufic Alameddine (Rockdale City Suns) | Amy Dahdah (Marconi Stallions) |

=== National Premier Leagues NSW 2 ===
| Award | Men's | Women's |
|---|---|---|
| Player of the Year | Peter Crevani (Sydney University) | Freya Hickey (Sutherland Shire) |
| Golden Boot | Gerard Ouffoue (Macarthur Rams) | Jayme Fressard (Central Coast Mariners Academy) |
| Coach of the Year | Franco Cosentino (Parramatta FC) | Shelly Youman (Central Coast Mariners Academy) |
| Goalkeeper of the Year | Luke Turnbull (Parramatta FC) | Amanda Seskin (UNSW Lions) & Jessica Daymond (Western NSW) |
| U-20's Golden Boot | Asmir Kadric (Macarthur Rams) | Sarah Mandile (Inter Lions) & Sarah Hickling (UNSW Lions) |
| U-20's Player of the Year | Damien Smith (Parramatta FC) | Sarah Hickling (UNSW Lions) |
