= 2013 Football NSW season =

Football New South Wales
- Season: 2013
- Champions: Bonnyrigg White Eagles

The Football NSW 2013 season was the first season under the new competition format in New South Wales. The competition consisted of four divisions across the State of New South Wales, created from the teams in the previous structure. The overall premier for the new structure qualified for the National Premier Leagues finals series, competing with the other state federation champions in a final knockout tournament to decide the National Premier Leagues Champion for 2013.

== League Tables ==
=== 2013 National Premier League NSW Men's 1 ===
NPL NSW Men's 1
- Season: 2013
- Champions: Bonnyrigg White Eagles
- Premiers: Sydney United 58
- Relegated: Central Coast Mariners Academy
- Matches: 132
- Goals: 426 (3.23 per match)
- Top goalscorer: Ritchie Cardozo; Luka Glavas; Panagiotis Nikas (16 goals)
- Biggest home win: 4 goals (5 times)
- Biggest away win: Central Coast Mariners Academy 1–6 Sutherland Sharks (22 June 2013)
- Highest scoring: South Coast Wolves 4–4 APIA Leichhardt Tigers (18 May 2013); Blacktown City 3–5 Central Coast Mariners Academy (30 June 2013)

The National Premier League New South Wales 2013 season was played over 22 rounds, from March to August 2013.

Pos	Team	Pld	W	D	L	GF	GA	GD	Pts	Qualification or relegation
1	Sydney United 58	22	14	3	5	46	30	+16	45	Qualified for the 2013 National Premier Leagues Finals
2	Sutherland Sharks	22	13	5	4	47	26	+21	44	Qualified for the 2013 NSW Finals
3	Bonnyrigg White Eagles (C)	22	13	4	5	44	30	+14	43	Qualified for the 2013 NSW Finals
4	Rockdale City Suns	22	11	6	5	37	21	+16	39	Qualified for the 2013 NSW Finals
5	Marconi Stallions	22	11	4	7	29	26	+3	37	Qualified for the 2013 NSW Finals
6	Blacktown City	22	10	6	6	44	32	+12	36	
7	Sydney Olympic	22	8	5	9	30	29	+1	29	
8	Manly United	22	6	8	8	34	35	−1	26	
9	Blacktown Spartans	22	6	5	11	28	31	−3	23	
10	Central Coast Mariners Academy (R)	22	4	3	15	30	62	−32	15	Relegated to the 2014 NPL NSW 2
11	APIA Leichhardt Tigers	22	2	8	12	29	48	−19	14	
12	South Coast Wolves	22	3	5	14	28	53	−25	14	

Source: sportingpulse.com
Rules for classification: 1) points; 2) goal difference; 3) number of goals scored.
(C) Champions; (R) Relegated

==== Finals ====
Qualifying Final
2	Sutherland Sharks	2
3	Bonnyrigg White Eagles	5
4	Rockdale City Suns	1 (4)
5	Marconi Stallions	1 (2)

Major Semi-Final
1	Sydney United 58	1 (3)
3	Bonnyrigg White Eagles	1 (5)
Minor Semi-Final
2	Sutherland Sharks	1
4	Rockdale City Suns	2

Preliminary final
1	Sydney United 58	2 (3)
4	Rockdale City Suns	2 (4)

Grand Final
3	Bonnyrigg White Eagles	1
4	Rockdale City Suns	0

=== 2013 National Premier League NSW Men's 2 ===
NPL NSW Men's 2
- Season: 2013
- Champions: St George
- Promoted: St George
- Matches: 132
- Goals: 402 (3.05 per match)
- Top goalscorer: Juan Chavez (17 goals)
- Biggest home win: St George 6–1 Mt Druitt Town (14 April 2013); Parramatta FC 5–0 Bankstown City (5 May 2013)
- Biggest away win: Mt Druitt Town 0–5 Macarthur Rams (1 June 2013)
- Highest scoring: St George 6–1 Mt Druitt Town (14 April 2013)

The 2013 National Premier League NSW Men's 2 was the first edition of the new NPL NSW 2 as the second level domestic association football competition in New South Wales. 12 teams competed, all playing each other twice for a total of 22 rounds, with the top team at the end of the year being promoted to the NPL NSW Men's 1 competition.

Pos	Team	Pld	W	D	L	GF	GA	GD	Pts	Qualification or relegation
1	St George (P, C)	22	14	5	3	52	25	+27	47	Promoted to the 2014 NPL NSW Men's 1
2	Macarthur Rams	22	11	7	4	33	20	+13	40	Qualified for the 2013 NPL NSW Men's 2 Finals
3	Mounties Wanderers	22	10	4	8	38	28	+10	34	Qualified for the 2013 NPL NSW Men's 2 Finals
4	Fraser Park	22	10	4	8	31	33	−2	34	Qualified for the 2013 NPL NSW Men's 2 Finals
5	Bankstown Berries	22	8	9	5	42	34	+8	33	Qualified for the 2013 NPL NSW Men's 2 Finals
6	Spirit FC	22	9	6	7	28	29	−1	33	
7	Parramatta FC	22	9	4	9	31	24	+7	31	
8	Northern Tigers	22	8	6	8	27	25	+2	30	
9	Hills United	22	7	5	10	33	36	−3	26	
10	Bankstown City	22	7	5	10	30	40	−10	26	
11	Sydney University	22	4	6	12	32	50	−18	18	
12	Mt Druitt Town Rangers	22	3	3	16	25	58	−33	12	

Source: FootballNSW
(C) Champions; (P) Promoted

==== Finals ====
Qualifying Final
2	Macarthur Rams	2
3	Mounties Wanderers	1
4	Fraser Park	2
5	Bankstown Berries	1

Major Semi-Final
1	St George	2
2	Macarthur Rams	1
Minor Semi-Final
3	Mounties Wanderers	1
4	Fraser Park	0

Preliminary final
2	Macarthur Rams	0
3	Mounties Wanderers	3

Grand Final
1	St George	3
3	Mounties Wanderers	1

=== 2013 NSW State League Division 1 ===
NSW State League Division 1
- Season: 2013
- Champions: Balmain Tigers
- Relegated: Prospect United
- Matches: 132
- Goals: 479 (3.63 per match)
- Top goalscorer: Rosario Occhipiniti (17 goals)
- Biggest home win: Northbridge FC 7–1 Hawkesbury City (7 July 2013)
- Biggest away win: Western NSW Mariners FC 1–7 Dulwich Hill (6 April 2013)
- Highest scoring: 9 goals (3 games)

The 2013 NSW State League Division 1 was the first edition of the State League to be incorporated under the National Premier Leagues banner. 12 teams competed, all playing each other twice for a total of 22 rounds. At the end of the season, one team was promoted from the State League Division 2, with one team relegated to the State League Division 1.

Pos	Team	Pld	W	D	L	GF	GA	GD	Pts	Qualification or relegation
1	Northbridge FC	22	13	3	6	52	35	+17	42	Qualified for the 2013 NSW State League Division 1 Finals
2	Dulwich Hill	22	12	5	5	47	27	+20	41	Qualified for the 2013 NSW State League Division 1 Finals
3	Balmain Tigers (C)	22	11	6	5	42	32	+10	39	Qualified for the 2013 NSW State League Division 1 Finals
4	Hakoah Sydney City East	22	12	1	9	43	33	+10	37	Qualified for the 2013 NSW State League Division 1 Finals
5	Granville Rage	22	10	6	6	39	32	+7	36	Qualified for the 2013 NSW State League Division 1 Finals
6	Hawkesbury City	22	11	2	9	50	44	+6	35	
7	Gladesville Ryde Magic	22	9	3	10	46	38	+8	30	
8	Inter Lions	22	8	2	12	37	41	−4	26	
9	Nepean FC	22	7	5	10	34	45	−11	26	
10	Prospect United (R)	22	6	6	10	33	35	−2	24	Relegated to the 2014 NSW State League Division 2
11	Western NSW Mariners	22	5	4	13	34	58	−24	19	
12	Camden Tigers	22	5	3	14	22	59	−37	18	

(C) Champions; (R) Relegated

==== Finals ====
Qualifying Final
2	Dulwich Hill	0
3	Balmain Tigers	3
4	Hakoah Sydney City East	2
5	Granville Rage	1

Major Semi-Final
1	Northbridge FC	1
3	Balmain Tigers	0
Minor Semi-Final
2	Dulwich Hill	2
4	Hakoah Sydney City East	3

Preliminary final
3	Balmain Tigers	4
4	Hakoah Sydney City East	1

Grand Final
1	Northbridge FC	0
3	Balmain Tigers	2

=== 2013 NSW State League Division 2 ===
NSW State League Division 2
- Season: 2013
- Champions: Stanmore Hawks
- Promoted: Stanmore Hawks
- Matches: 110
- Goals: 356 (3.24 per match)
- Top goalscorer: Neil Philippou (25 goals)
- Biggest home win: Stanmore Hawks 8–0 Schofield Scorpions (1 September 2013)
- Biggest away win: Schofield Scorpions 0–16 Stanmore Hawks (16 June 2013)
- Highest scoring: Schofield Scorpions 0–16 Stanmore Hawks (16 June 2013) (16 goals)

The 2013 NSW State League Division 2 was the first edition of the State League to be incorporated under the National Premier Leagues banner. 11 teams competed, all playing each other twice for a total of 20 matches. At the end of the season, one team was promoted from the State League Division 2, with one team relegated from the State League Division 1.

Pos	Team	Pld	W	D	L	GF	GA	GD	Pts	Qualification or relegation
1	Stanmore Hawks (C, P)	20	16	0	4	66	15	+51	48	Promoted to the 2014 NSW State League Division 1
2	Fairfield City Lions	20	13	3	4	54	18	+36	42	Qualified for the 2013 NSW State League Division 2 Finals
3	University of NSW	20	11	5	4	30	18	+12	38	Qualified for the 2013 NSW State League Division 2 Finals
4	Southern Bulls	20	10	3	7	28	21	+7	33	Qualified for the 2013 NSW State League Division 2 Finals
5	Western Condors	20	8	7	5	30	18	+12	31	Qualified for the 2013 NSW State League Division 2 Finals
6	Belmore United	20	9	3	8	37	28	+9	30	Team not granted a licence for 2014 season
7	Southern Branch	20	9	2	9	23	30	−7	29	
8	Hurstville FC	20	7	2	11	32	37	−5	23	
9	Hurstville City Minotaurs	20	6	3	11	31	29	+2	21	
10	Enfield Rovers	20	6	2	12	23	38	−15	20	
11	Schofield Scorpions	20	0	0	20	2	104	−102	0	Team withdrew at end of season

(C) Champions; (P) Promoted

==== Finals ====
Qualifying Final
2	Fairfield City	3
3	University of NSW	0
4	Southern Bulls	2
5	Western Condors	4

Major Semi-Final
1	Stanmore Hawks	4
2	Fairfield City	1
Minor Semi-Final
3	University of NSW	0
5	Western Condors	1

Preliminary final
2	Fairfield City	4
5	Western Condors	1

Grand Final
1	Stanmore Hawks	1
2	Fairfield City	0

== Awards ==
The end of year awards were presented on 27 September 2013 at Rosehill Gardens Grand Pavilion.

=== National Premier Leagues NSW Men's / Women's Premier League ===
Award	Men's	Women's
Player of the Year	Panny Nikas (Sutherland Sharks)	Michelle Carney (Illawarra Stingrays)
Golden Boot	Richard Cardozo (Rockdale City Suns), Luka Glavas (Sydney United), Panny Nikas (Sutherland Sharks) – 16 goals	Michelle Carney (Illawarra Stingrays)
Coach of the Year	Mark Rudan (Sydney United)	Brett Wallin (Illawarra Stingrays)
Goalkeeper of the Year	James Chronopolous (Marconi Stallions)	Sarah Gallop (Illawarra Stingrays)
Goal of the Year	Aaron Peterson (Bonnyrigg White Eagles)	—
Referee of the Year	Kurt Ams	Katie-Louise Patterson
U-20's Golden Boot	Josh Bingham (South Coast Wolves)	Demi Koulizakis (FNSW Institute)
U-20's Player of the Year	Toufic Alameddine (Rockdale City Suns)	Kimberley Davey (NSW Koalas)

=== National Premier Leagues NSW Men's 2 ===
Award	Player
Player of the Year	Danny Choi (Parramatta FC)
Golden Boot	Juan Chavez (St George FC)
Coach of the Year	Manny Spanoudakis (St George FC)
Goalkeeper of the Year	Dion Shaw (St George FC)
U-20's Golden Boot	Stephen Grbevski (St George FC) & Glen Kelshaw (Hills Brumbies)
U-20's Player of the Year	Panayioti Gotsis (Bankstown Berries)
