= Mitchell Whalley =

Australian soccer player

Personal information
- Full name: Mitchell Whalley
- Date of birth: 5 February 1999 (age 27)
- Place of birth: Sydney, Australia
- Height: 5 ft 10 in (1.77 m)
- Position: Right winger

Team information
- Current team: Western Rage

Youth career
- –2017: Blacktown City
- 2017–2018: Panserraikos
- 2019: AEL

Senior career*
Years	Team	Apps	(Gls)
2017	Blacktown City	14	(3)
2017–2018	Panserraikos	1	(0)
2019–2020	AEL	0	(0)
2020	Dulwich Hill	17	(2)
2021–	Western Rage	14	(1)
- * Club domestic league appearances and goals as of 10 November 2021

Mitchell Whalley (born 5 February 1999) is an Australian professional soccer player who plays as a right winger.
