= Isaac Hovar =

Australian soccer player

Personal information
- Full name: Isaac Hovar
- Date of birth: 8 September 2002 (age 24)
- Place of birth: Talgarno, Australia
- Position: Left back

Team information
- Current team: Dulwich Hill
- Number: 23

Youth career
- Albury City FC
- Western Sydney Wanderers

Senior career*
Years	Team	Apps	(Gls)
2020–2022	Western Sydney Wanderers NPL	28	(1)
2022	Western Sydney Wanderers	1	(0)
2022–2023	Northbridge Bulls	26	(0)
2022–2024	Macarthur FC	3	(0)
2024	Hills United	16	(0)
2025–	Dulwich Hill	24	(1)
- * Club domestic league appearances and goals as of 19 February 2026 ‡ National team caps and goals as of 14 April 2022

Isaac Hovar (born 8 September 2002) is an Australian professional soccer player who plays as a left back for Dulwich Hill.
