= 1999–2000 Northern Spirit FC season =

Northern Spirit
1999–2000 season
- Stadium: North Sydney Oval; North Power Stadium
- National Soccer League: 13th
- Top goalscorer: David Seal (9)
- Highest home attendance: 16,134 vs. Sydney Olympic (29 October 1999); National Soccer League
- Lowest home attendance: 3,481 vs. Gippsland Falcons (24 March 2000); National Soccer League
- Average home league attendance: 8,304
- Biggest win: 3–0 vs. Sydney United (7 January 2000); National Soccer League; 3–0 vs. Melbourne Knights (7 April 2000); National Soccer League
- Biggest defeat: 0–3 (3 times); 1–4 (once)

The 1999–2000 season was the second season in the history of Northern Spirit (now North West Sydney Spirit). It was also the second season in the National Soccer League where they finished 13th.

== Players ==
Note: Flags indicate national team as defined under FIFA eligibility rules; some limited exceptions apply. Players may hold more than one non-FIFA nationality.

No.	Pos.	Nation	Player
—	FW	AUS	Graham Arnold
—	MF	ITA	Nicola Berti
—	MF	AUS	Paul Bilokapic
—	MF	AUS	Matthew Bingley
—	DF	AUS	Luke Casserly
—	FW	AUS	Simon Catanzaro
—	MF	AUS	Sean Cranney
—	MF	AUS	Troy Cranney
—	MF	ENG	Ian Crook
—	DF	AUS	Dean Culina
—	DF	AUS	Michael Cunico
—	MF	AUS	Robert Enes
—	MF	AUS	Anthony Faria
—	DF	AUS	Adam Griffiths
—	FW	AUS	Ryan Griffiths
—	GK	AUS	Paul Henderson

No.	Pos.	Nation	Player
—	MF	AUS	Matthew Langdon
—	MF	AUS	Shane Lyons
—	DF	ENG	Phil Moss
—	FW	AUS	Tony Perinich
—	GK	AUS	John Perosh
—	DF	AUS	Michael Prentice
—	DF	AUS	Marko Rudan
—	FW	AUS	Abbas Saad
—	FW	AUS	David Seal
—	MF	AUS	Robbie Slater
—	MF	AUS	Adam Snyder
—	MF	AUS	Jack Sobczyk
—	GK	AUS	Jess Vanstrattan
—	DF	AUS	Paul Wearne
—	FW	AUS	Clayton Zane

== Transfers ==
=== Transfers in ===
No.	Position	Player	Transferred from	Type/fee	Date	Ref
—	MF	Sean Cranney	Brisbane Strikers		July 1999	
—	MF	Shane Lyons	(England) Nuneaton Borough		July 1999	
—	FW	Abbas Saad	Sydney United		July 1999	
—	FW	David Seal	(England) Northampton Town		July 1999	
—	DF	Dean Culina	(Australia) Westvale SC		August 1999	
—	DF	Paul Wearne	(Australia) Manly Warringah Dolphins		September 1999	

=== Transfers out ===
No.	Position	Player	Transferred to	Type/fee	Date	Ref
—	GK	Peter Blazincic	West Adelaide		June 1999	
—	MF	Paul Foster	Brisbane Strikers		June 1999	
—	MF	(Croatia) Kresimir Marusic	(Belgium) Lommel		June 1999	
—	MF	Gabriel Mendez	Sydney Olympic		June 1999	
—	FW	Scott Ollerenshaw	(Australia) Gladesville Ryde Magic		June 1999	
—	FW	Daniel Watkins	Canberra Cosmos		June 1999	
—	GK	John Perosh	Sydney Olympic		February 2000	
—	MF	Shane Lyons	Canberra City		April 2000	
—	MF	(England) Phil Moss	(Australia) Fraser Park		April 2000	
—	FW	Clayton Zane	(Norway) Molde		April 2000	
—	DF	Luke Casserly	(Sweden) AIK		May 2000	

== Competitions ==
=== Overview ===
Competition	First match	Last match	Starting round	Final position	Record							
Competition	First match	Last match	Starting round	Final position	Pld	W	D	L	GF	GA	GD	Win %
National Soccer League	4 October 1999	7 May 2000	Matchday 1	13th	34	11	3	20	41	58	−17	32.35
Total					34	11	3	20	41	58	−17	32.35

Last updated: complete
Source: Competitions

=== National Soccer League ===
==== League table ====
Pos	Team	Pld	W	D	L	GF	GA	GD	Pts	Qualification
1	Perth Glory	34	19	7	8	60	42	+18	64	Qualification for the Finals series
2	Wollongong Wolves (C)	34	17	9	8	72	44	+28	60	Qualification for the Finals series and the Oceania Club Championship
3	Carlton	34	17	7	10	55	39	+16	58	Qualification for the Finals series
4	Adelaide Force	34	16	8	10	57	37	+20	56	Qualification for the Finals series
5	Sydney Olympic	34	16	7	11	56	40	+16	55	Qualification for the Finals series
6	Marconi Fairfield	34	16	7	11	53	49	+4	55	Qualification for the Finals series
7	Newcastle Breakers	34	14	9	11	44	44	0	51	
8	Auckland Kingz	34	15	5	14	57	59	−2	50	
9	Brisbane Strikers	34	13	10	11	46	40	+6	49	
10	South Melbourne	34	14	7	13	55	51	+4	49	
11	Parramatta Power	34	14	5	15	52	47	+5	47	
12	Melbourne Knights	34	13	6	15	44	57	−13	45	
13	Northern Spirit	34	11	3	20	41	58	−17	36	
14	Canberra Cosmos	34	9	9	16	44	64	−20	36	
15	Gippsland Falcons	34	7	8	19	23	49	−26	29	
16	Sydney United	34	5	5	24	19	58	−39	20	

Source: rsssf.com
Rules for classification: 1) points; 2) goal difference; 3) number of goals scored.
(C) Champions

==== Results summary ====
Overall								Home						Away					
Pld	W	D	L	GF	GA	GD	Pts	W	D	L	GF	GA	GD	W	D	L	GF	GA	GD
34	11	3	20	41	58	−17	36	8	2	7	22	22	0	3	1	13	19	36	−17

Source: worldfootball.net

==== Results by round ====
Round	1	2	3	4	5	6	7	8	9	10	11	12	13	14	15	16	17	18	19	20	21	22	23	24	25	26	27	28	29	30	31	32	33	34
Ground	A	A	H	A	H	A	A	H	A	H	A	H	A	H	H	H	A	H	A	H	A	H	A	H	H	A	H	A	H	A	H	A	H	A
Result	W	L	L	D	L	L	L	W	L	W	W	L	W	L	W	D	L	W	L	D	L	W	L	L	W	L	W	L	W	L	L	L	L	L
Position	3	9	11	11	14	15	16	14	16	14	11	13	11	11	10	11	11	11	11	12	12	11	12	12	12	13	13	13	12	13	13	13	13	13

Source: worldfootball.net
A = Away; H = Home; W = Win; D = Draw; L = Loss

==== Matches ====
4 October 1999 1	Sydney United	0–2	Northern Spirit	Sydney
		Report	Slater 53'; Seal 60'	Stadium: Sydney United Sports Centre; Attendance: 5,023; Referee: Mark Shield

10 October 1999 2	South Melbourne	2–0	Northern Spirit	Melbourne
	Curcija 16', 47'	Report		Stadium: Bob Jane Stadium; Attendance: 6,917; Referee: Wayne Dade

15 October 1999 3	Northern Spirit	0–2	Newcastle Breakers	Sydney
		Report	Owens 14'; Juchniewicz 89'	Stadium: North Sydney Oval; Attendance: 12,733; Referee: Matthew Breeze

23 October 1999 4	Brisbane Strikers	2–2	Northern Spirit	Brisbane
	Foster 6'; Grierson 40'	Report	Bingley 35'; Saad 90'	Stadium: Suncorp Stadium; Attendance: 4,009; Referee: Gerry Connolly

29 October 1999 5	Northern Spirit	0–1	Sydney Olympic	Sydney
		Report	Rudan 15' (o.g.)	Stadium: North Sydney Oval; Attendance: 16,134; Referee: Mark Shield

7 November 1999 6	Wollongong Wolves	3–0	Northern Spirit	Wollongong
	Petrovski 1', 33'; Young 62'	Report		Stadium: Brandon Park; Attendance: 5,123; Referee: Eddie Lennie

13 November 1999 7	Marconi Fairfield	1–0	Northern Spirit	Sydney
	Babic 3'	Report		Stadium: Marconi Stadium; Attendance: 9,123; Referee: Simon Micallef

19 November 1999 8	Northern Spirit	3–2	Football Kingz	Sydney
	Bingley 33'; Saad 38'; Slater 83'	Report	Stergiopoulos 17'; Osman 85'	Stadium: North Sydney Oval; Attendance: 8,933; Referee: Matthew Breeze

27 November 1999 9	Gippsland Falcons	2–0	Northern Spirit	Morwell
	Puca 21'; Mandic 27'	Report		Stadium: Falcons Park; Attendance: 2,173; Referee: Con Dioms

3 December 1999 10	Northern Spirit	1–0	Marconi Fairfield	Sydney
	Moss 58'	Report		Stadium: North Sydney Oval; Attendance: 9,089; Referee: Gerry Connolly

12 December 1999 11	Melbourne Knights	0–1	Northern Spirit	Melbourne
		Report	Perinich 83'	Stadium: Knights Stadium; Attendance: 3,820; Referee: Perry Mur

17 December 1999 12	Northern Spirit	0–3	Adelaide Force	Sydney
		Report	Mori 34', 58', 78'	Stadium: North Sydney Oval; Attendance: 6,106; Referee: Simon Micallef

28 December 1999 13	Canberra Cosmos	1–3	Northern Spirit	Canberra
	Polak 50'	Report	Perinich 2', 73'; Bingley 81'	Stadium: Bruce Stadium; Attendance: 1,863; Referee: Con Diomis

2 January 2000 14	Northern Spirit	0–2	Brisbane Strikers	Sydney
		Report	McLaren 20'; Grierson 29'	Stadium: North Sydney Oval; Attendance: 6,714; Referee: Gerry Connolly

7 January 2000 15	Northern Spirit	3–0	Sydney United	Sydney
	Cunico 16'; Seal 47'; Langdon 67'	Report		Stadium: North Sydney Oval; Attendance: 11,772; Referee: Simon Micallef

14 January 2000 16	Northern Spirit	1–1	Perth Glory	Sydney
	Casserly 32'	Report	Boutsianis 62'	Stadium: North Sydney Oval; Attendance: 11,128; Referee: Brett Hugo

21 January 2000 17	Carlton	1–0	Northern Spirit	Melbourne
	Marth 86' (Pen.)	Report		Stadium: Olympic Park; Attendance: 2,167; Referee: Matthew Breeze

26 January 2000 18	Northern Spirit	3–2	Carlton	Sydney
	Seal 50'; Bingley 80'; Saad 87'	Report	Thompson 38'; Moreira 62'	Stadium: North Sydney Oval; Attendance: 7,138; Referee: David Dwight

29 January 2000 19	Parramatta Power	4–3	Northern Spirit	Sydney
	Griffiths 9', 15'; Santalab 49'; Sterjovski 53'	Report	Seal 12', 52'; Langdon 23'	Stadium: Parramatta Stadium; Attendance: 8,120; Referee: Mark Shield

4 February 2000 20	Northern Spirit	2–2	South Melbourne	Sydney
	Seal 2'; Perinich 72'	Report	Curcija 49' (pen.); Goutzioulis 88'	Stadium: North Sydney Oval; Attendance: 7,205; Referee: Simon Micallef

11 February 2000 21	Newcastle Breakers	4–1	Northern Spirit	Newcastle
	Buonavoglia 35', 41'; Angievski 80'; Tanchevski 82'	Report	Lyons 85'	Stadium: Breakers Stadium; Attendance: 6,978; Referee: Gerry Connolly

18 February 2000 22	Northern Spirit	1–0	Brisbane Strikers	Sydney
	Bilokapic 57'	Report		Stadium: North Sydney Oval; Attendance: 10,438; Referee: Eddie Lennie

27 February 2000 23	Sydney Olympic	3–1	Northern Spirit	Sydney
	Arambasic 16'; Emerton 23'; Cardozo 40'	Report	Slater 38'	Stadium: Belmore Sports Ground; Attendance: 7,232; Referee: Simon Micallef

3 March 2000 24	Northern Spirit	0–3	Wollongong Wolves	Sydney
		Report	Young 21' (pen.); Cervinski 26'; Horsley 57'	Stadium: North Sydney Oval; Attendance: 5,500; Referee: Brett Hugo

10 March 2000 25	Northern Spirit	2–1	Marconi Fairfield	Sydney
	Babic 3' (o.g.); Seal 44' (pen.)	Report	Invincible 83'	Stadium: North Sydney Oval; Attendance: 4,384; Referee: Matthew Breeze

17 March 2000 26	Football Kingz	3–2	Northern Spirit	Auckland
	Rufer 20'; Ngata 55' (pen.); Perry 69'	Report	Seal 43'; Cranney 62'	Stadium: North Harbour Stadium; Attendance: 3,562; Referee: Simon Micallef

24 March 2000 27	Northern Spirit	2–0	Gippsland Falcons	Sydney
	Seal 40'; Griffiths 77'	Report		Stadium: North Sydney Oval; Attendance: 3,481; Referee: Con Diomis

2 April 2000 28	Marconi Fairfield	3–2	Northern Spirit	Sydney
	Awaritefe 50'; Rudan 75' (o.g.); Babic 90+5'	Report	Langdon 55'; Bilokapic 82' (pen.)	Stadium: Marconi Stadium; Attendance: 6,235; Referee: Brett Hugo

7 April 2000 29	Northern Spirit	3–0	Melbourne Knights	Sydney
	Langdon 45'; Griffiths 76'; Bingley 82'	Report		Stadium: North Sydney Oval; Attendance: 5,703; Referee: Craig Zetter

14 April 2000 30	Adelaide City	4–2	Northern Spirit	Adelaide
	Mori 37', 44', 69', 90'	Report	R. Griffiths 31'; S. Cranney 90+2'	Stadium: Hindmarsh Stadium; Attendance: 4,920; Referee: Jeremy Blaney

22 April 2000 31	Northern Spirit	1–2	Canberra Cosmos	Gosford
	R. Griffiths 55'	Report	Clark 36', 57'	Stadium: North Power Stadium; Attendance: 10,214; Referee: Mark Shield

25 April 2000 32	Brisbane Strikers	2–0	Northern Spirit	Brisbane
	Grierson 75'; Srhoj 82'	Report		Stadium: Suncorp Stadium; Attendance: 1,669; Referee: Matthew Breeze

28 April 2000 33	Northern Spirit	0–1	Parramatta Power	Sydney
		Report	Gibson 79'	Stadium: North Sydney Oval; Attendance: 4,512; Referee: Con Diomis

7 May 2000 34	Perth Glory	1–0	Northern Spirit	Perth
	Harnwell 38'	Report		Stadium: Perth Oval; Attendance: 13,554; Referee: Matthew Breeze

== Statistics ==
=== Appearances and goals ===
Players with no appearances not included in the list.

No.	Pos.	Nat.	Name	National Soccer League		Total	
No.	Pos.	Nat.	Name	Apps	Goals	Apps	Goals
—	FW	(Australia)	Graham Arnold	5(1)	0	6	0
—	MF	(Italy)	Nicola Berti	8	0	8	0
—	MF	(Australia)	Paul Bilokapic	24(2)	2	26	2
—	MF	(Australia)	Matthew Bingley	27	5	27	5
—	DF	(Australia)	Luke Casserly	18	1	18	1
—	FW	(Australia)	Simon Catanzaro	4(13)	0	17	0
—	MF	(Australia)	Sean Cranney	9(2)	1	11	1
—	MF	(Australia)	Troy Cranney	28(4)	1	32	1
—	MF	(England)	Ian Crook	7(5)	0	12	0
—	DF	(Australia)	Dean Culina	2(1)	0	3	0
—	DF	(Australia)	Michael Cunico	22(10)	1	32	1
—	MF	(Australia)	Robert Enes	20	0	20	0
—	MF	(Australia)	Anthony Faria	3(1)	0	4	0
—	DF	(Australia)	Adam Griffiths	12(4)	0	16	0
—	FW	(Australia)	Ryan Griffiths	6(5)	4	11	4
—	GK	(Australia)	Paul Henderson	14	0	14	0
—	MF	(Australia)	Matthew Langdon	25	4	25	4
—	MF	(Australia)	Shane Lyons	4(6)	1	10	1
—	DF	(England)	Phil Moss	7(9)	1	16	1
—	FW	(Australia)	Tony Perinich	14(3)	4	17	4
—	GK	(Australia)	John Perosh	17	0	17	0
—	DF	(Australia)	Michael Prentice	0(1)	0	1	0
—	DF	(Australia)	Marko Rudan	18(4)	0	22	0
—	FW	(Australia)	Abbas Saad	8(5)	3	13	3
—	FW	(Australia)	David Seal	17(3)	9	20	9
—	MF	(Australia)	Robbie Slater	27	3	27	3
—	MF	(Australia)	Adam Snyder	1(8)	0	9	0
—	MF	(Australia)	Jack Sobczyk	17(3)	0	20	0
—	GK	(Australia)	Jess Vanstrattan	3	0	3	0
—	DF	(Australia)	Paul Wearne	4	0	4	0
—	FW	(Australia)	Clayton Zane	3	0	3	0

=== Clean sheets ===
Rank	No.	Pos	Nat	Name	National Soccer League	Total
1	—	GK	(Australia)	Paul Henderson	4	4
2	—	GK	(Australia)	John Perosh	3	3
Total					7	7
