= Nepean FC =

- Full name: Nepean Football Club Inc
- Founded: 2011
- Ground: Cook Park
- League: NSW League Two
- 2026: 11th of 15
- Website: https://nepeanfc.com.au/

Nepean FC are a semi-professional football (soccer) club, from the Penrith and St Marys suburbs in Western Sydney. The club was founded in 2011. The Men's team currently plays in the NSW State League, the fourth tier of football in New South Wales and the fifth tier in Australia when including the national competition, the A-League.

== History ==
The area has been previously represented by a number of clubs, most recently Penrith Nepean United who folded in 2009 whilst competing in the NSW Premier League.

In the absence of representative football in the Penrith area, the Nepean District Soccer Football Association, (now Nepean Football Association) set out to create a club and a pathway for local footballers to play at a representative level.

Nepean FC were the hosts and opponents of new A-League club Western Sydney Wanderers first ever match. The match took place at Cook Park in front of more than 3500 spectators. Nepean FC lost the match 5–0 with Joey Gibbs grabbing four goals.

Despite finishing last in State League Division 2 in 2012, Nepean FC were placed in State League Division 1 for 2013 when Football NSW undertook a significant restructure of the league system to meet the criteria of the nationally implemented National Premier Leagues.

In 2014 the Women's team recorded Nepean FC's best result to date by winning the Women's State League and securing promotion to the 2015 National Premier Leagues Division 2.

== Teams ==
Nepean FC as a club comprises:

- 2 men’s teams (1st Grade and U20s) in NSW National Premier League Four
- 5 female teams entered in the National Premier League's NSW Women's Division 2 (1st Grade & Reserve Grade)
- 10 boy's teams (FNSW Boys Youth League Division 2 Youth U13 ~ U18; Association Youth League U13 ~ U18)
- 3 female teams (National Premier Leagues Division 2 Girls Youth U13 ~ U16)
- 8 teams in Association Youth League Skills Acquisition Program: SAP (Boys - U9 ~ U12) & GSAP (Girls - U10 ~ U13).

== Club colours, logo and kit ==
The club's shirt is predominantly red with a large white stripe running vertically on the left. The shorts and socks are red. Nepean FC is administered by the Nepean Football Association, which has clubs from four council areas, City of Penrith, City of Blue Mountains, City of Hawkesbury and Wollondilly Shire. Hence the logo represents the three significant geographical symbols of these regions, the mountains and the 2 rivers of the Nepean and Hawkesbury.

== Seasons ==
=== Men's League ===
Season	Division	P	W	D	L	GF	GA	Pts	Position	Finals
2011	State League Division 2	26	5	7	14	26	55	22	12 / 14	–
2012	State League Division 2	22	4	5	13	25	50	17	12 / 12	–
2013	State League Division 1	22	7	5	10	34	45	26	9 / 12	–
2014	State League Division 1	22	6	5	11	30	43	23	9 / 12	–
2015	State League Division 1	22	4	3	15	25	60	15	12 / 12	–
2016	NSW State League	22	8	4	10	35	48	28	6 / 12	–
2017	NSW State League	18	11	2	5	36	19	35	3 / 10	3rd
2018	NSW State League	21	11	2	8	49	32	35	5 / 12	3rd
2019	NSW State League	20	8	3	9	43	28	27	6 / 11	–
2020	NPL4	10	5	2	3	22	9	17	3 / 11	Champions
2021	NPL4	16	6	4	6	24	0	22	6 / 12	– (Note: Cancelled due to the COVID-19 pandemic in Australia.)

=== Men's Cup ===
Season	Cup	Round	Home team (tier)	Score	Away team (tier)
2011	Waratah Cup	Preliminary Round	Nepean FC (5)	0–2	Pacific Hills (-)
2012	Waratah Cup	R1	Doonside Hawks (6)	1–3	Nepean FC (5)
2012	Waratah Cup	R2	Nepean FC (5)	3–1	West City FC (5)
2012	Waratah Cup	R3	APIA Leichhardt Tigers (2)	2–0	Nepean FC (5)
2013	Waratah Cup	R3	Southern Bulls (5)	2–3	Nepean FC (4)
2013	Waratah Cup	R4	Parramatta FC (3)	3–1	Nepean FC (4)
2014	Waratah Cup / FFA Cup	R3 / Preliminary R3	Nepean FC (4)	2–5	Hawkesbury City (4)
2015	Waratah Cup and FFA Cup Qualifiers	Preliminary R3	Nepean FC (4)	1–0	Forest Rangers (7)
2015	Waratah Cup and FFA Cup Qualifiers	Preliminary R4	Nepean FC (4)	2–0	Hurlstone Park Wanderers (-)
2015	Waratah Cup and FFA Cup Qualifiers	Preliminary R5	Nepean FC (4)	1–0	Leichhardt Saints FC (-)
2015	Waratah Cup and FFA Cup Qualifiers	Preliminary R6	Blacktown City (2)	12–1	Nepean FC (4)
2016	FFA Cup Qualifiers	Preliminary R3	Rydalmere Lions (4)	2–1	Nepean FC (5)
2017	FFA Cup Qualifiers	Preliminary R3	Nepean FC (5)	11–2	Padstow United (6)
2017	FFA Cup Qualifiers	Preliminary R4	Hawkesbury City (4)	1–2	Nepean FC (5)
2017	FFA Cup Qualifiers	Preliminary R5	North Shore Mariners (3)	1–6	Nepean FC (5)
2017	FFA Cup Qualifiers	Preliminary R6	Nepean FC (5)	1–2 (a.e.t.)	Bulli FC (6)
2018	FFA Cup Qualifiers	Preliminary R3	East Gosford (-)	1–4	Nepean FC (5)
2018	FFA Cup Qualifiers	Preliminary R4	Nepean FC (5)	1–2	Kirrawee Kangaroos (-)
2019	FFA Cup Qualifiers	Preliminary R3	Kellyville Kolts (-)	1–2	Nepean FC (5)
2019	FFA Cup Qualifiers	Preliminary R4	Hawkesbury City (4)	0–4	Nepean FC (5)
2019	FFA Cup Qualifiers	Preliminary R5	Nepean FC (5)	3–1 (a.e.t.)	UNSW (5)
2019	FFA Cup Qualifiers	Preliminary R6	Nepean FC (5)	1–2 (a.e.t.)	Sydney Olympic (2)
2020	FFA Cup Qualifiers	did not enter			
2021	FFA Cup Qualifiers	Preliminary R3	Marayong FC (6)	1–0	Nepean FC (5)

=== Women's League ===
Season	Division	P	W	D	L	GF	GA	Pts	Position	Finals position
2011	Football NSW Women's Super League	18	6	8	4	38	35	22	6 / 10	–
2012	Football NSW Women's Super League	18	4	11	3	25	46	15	6 / 7	–
2013	Football NSW Women's State League	22	0	3	19	9	84	3	12 / 12	–
2014	Football NSW Women's State League	20	16	2	2	66	12	50	1 / 8	1st
2015	Football NSW Women's NPL2	21	7	4	10	27	42	25	6 / 8	–
2016	Football NSW Women's NPL2	21	6	9	6	20	18	27	5 / 8	–
2017	Football NSW Women's NPL2	18	7	3	6	20	16	24	4 / 9	4th
2018	Football NSW Women's NPL2	22	10	5	7	46	25	35	5 / 12	5th
2019	Football NSW Women's NPL2									-
