= Sean Cranney =

Australian footballer

Personal information
- Date of birth: 2 October 1973 (age 53)
- Position: Midfielder

Senior career*
Years	Team	Apps	(Gls)
1992–1993	Brisbane United		
1994–1999	Brisbane Strikers		
1999–2000	Northern Spirit		

International career
1996–1997	Australia	3	(0)
Medal record
Representing Australia
Men's Association football
OFC Nations Cup
Winner	1996 Oceania
- * Club domestic league appearances and goals

Sean Cranney (born 2 October 1973) is an Australian former association football player.

== Playing career ==
=== Club career ===
Cranney played for Taringa Rovers Soccer Football Club before joining Brisbane United in the Queensland state league in 1992 and 1993. In 1994, he was signed to National Soccer League team Brisbane Strikers. At the Strikers he played five seasons before moving to Northern Spirit for the 1990/2000 season.

=== International career ===
Cranney played for Australia at the 1993 FIFA World Youth Championship.

Cranney made his full international debut in November 1996 for Australia in an OFC Nations Cup match against New Zealand in Christchurch. He played two further matches for Australia, one against New Zealand five days after his debut and the other against South Africa in September 1997. In all three matches for Australia he came on a substitute.

== Honours ==
Brisbane Strikers

- National Soccer League: 1996–97; runner-up 1996–97

Australia

- OFC Nations Cup: 1996,
