= Hakoah Sydney City East FC =

Hakoah Football Club
- Full name: Maccabi Hakoah Sydney City East Football Club
- Founded: 1939; 87 years ago
- Ground: Hensley Athletic Field
- Capacity: 1,000
- Manager: Craig Sharpley
- League: NSW League One
- 2026: 7th of 16
- Website: hakoahfc.com.au
Home colours	Away colours

Maccabi Hakoah Sydney City East FC, commonly known as Maccabi Hakoah, is an Australian semi-professional soccer club based in Sydney, New South Wales. The club was formed in 1939 as Sydney Hakoah by members of Sydney's Jewish community. They played between 1977 and 1986 in the National Soccer League as Eastern Suburbs (1977–1979) and Sydney City (1979–1987). One of the most successful sides in New South Wales and interstate competitions in the 1960s and early 1970s coached by the now retired Bob Szatmari, Hakoah were also one of the main instigators for the establishment of a national league. The club currently competes in the National Premier Leagues NSW, with games played from Hensley Athletic Field.

A foundation member of the NSL, Sydney City were also its most dominant side in the competition's first decade, winning four titles, including three in a row from 1980 to 1982, and finishing below third only once. However, despite this level of success, crowds were perennially low, and even though they were one of the sides retained for 1987, after the NSL scrapped the split conference system at the end of 1986, Sydney City withdrew from the NSL one round into the 1987 season.

Hakoah Sydney City East FC are one of just three winners of the 1960s Australia Cup that are still active, the other being Caroline Springs George Cross FC and APIA Leichhardt FC.

== History ==
Chart of yearly table positions for Sydney City in NSL

In January 1939 a group of Jewish immigrants, who had been playing soccer in Rushcutters Bay each Sunday met to discuss the formation of a soccer club. That meeting resulted in the birth of Sydney Hakoah Football Club. However, it was not until 1954 that Hakoah was admitted to the Southern League, a semi-professional regional league in New South Wales. The team played in distinctive blue and white striped shirts featuring the Magen David badge.

The club was admitted to the newly created first division of the New South Wales Soccer Federation following the breakaway of a number of clubs from the FIFA associated Soccer Association in 1956/57.

In 1977, the club's name was changed to Eastern Suburbs Hakoah. They were the winner of the first National League, known as the National Soccer League.

The club's name was again changed to Sydney City in 1978, and the home ground was moved from Wentworth Park to ES Marks Field in a successful year for the club. Eddie Thomson became coach in 1979, and together with manager Andrew Lederer led the club through its final years as Australia's most successful club.

The team included future International Jimmy Cant, Jim Patikas, striker Ken Boden and Australia's most successful goal scorer John Kosmina for the 1980 season. They went on to win the 1981, 1982 and 1983 NSL seasons with Australian International striker David Mitchell joining the star-studded club. In 1987 Sydney City withdrew mid-season as the most successful club in the league's history.

=== NSW State League return ===
Since 1988 Sydney City has competed in the NSW State League North Conference in the NSW State Leagues. In the 2010s, it moved up through the New South Wales football ranks and have been promoted rapidly. In 2014 Hakoah were in NSW's 3rd division (State League 1) and won the Premiership and Grand Final Championship trophies which culminated in winning the Club Championship crown and gaining promotion to the (national premier leagues NSW2), eventually almost replicating that season in 2015, once again winning promotion, this time into the top tier in NSW. In 2012 they also won the double as State League Division Two Premiers and Grand Final Champions under the Hakoah FC banner playing out of Hensley Athletic Field.

They returned to the National Premier Leagues NSW in the 2016 season, only to be relegated 3 seasons later in 2019.

== Seasons ==
Season	League										Waratah Cup	NPL Finals Aust. Cup / NSL Cup / FFA Cup	Top scorer	
Season	Div	Pld	W	D	L	GF	GA	Pts	Pos	Finals	Waratah Cup	NPL Finals Aust. Cup / NSL Cup / FFA Cup	Player(s)	Goals
1993	NSW Division 1 ↓	22	5	3+1	13	26	58	22	10th					
1994	NSW Division 2 ↓	22	6	2+2	12	32	46	24	12th					
1995	NSW Division 3	22	10	7+1	4	38	23	45	3rd					
1996	NSW Division 3	22	7	4	11	22	44	25	9th					
1997	NSW Division 3	22	7	5	10	40	35	26	8th					
1998	NSW Division 3 (Note: Hakoah missing information against Hawkesbury City. The game was either cancelled or result unknown. All other teams played 22-game seasons.)	21	8	2	11	38	44	26	6th					
1999	NSW Division 3 ↑	22	15	3	4	75	29	48	3rd					
2000	NSW Division 2 ↓	22	8	3	11	44	42	27	9th					
2001	NSW Division 2	22	5	4	13	33	59	19	8th					
2002	NSW Division 2	19	9	2	8	35	32	29	7th					
2003	NSW Division 2	24	7	11	6	41	40	32	9th					
2004	NSW Division 2	20	10	4	6	33	28	34	3rd	SF				
2005	NSW Division 2	18	11	4	3	35	15	37	3rd	W				
2006	NSW Division 2	20	11	3	6	28	19	36	4th	RU				
2007	NSW Conference League (Note: The league had two conferences, North and South. Hakoah was in Southern Conference. All figures related to Southern Conference.)	21	10	3	8	73	34	33	4th		2R			
2008	NSW Conference League	16	10	3	3	76	16	33	2nd	SF	2R			
2009	NSW State League Div.2	22	7	6	8	41	42	27	11th		1R			
2010	NSW State League Div.2	22	2	6	14	25	47	12	12th		1R			
2011	NSW State League Div.2	22	16	5	5	67	34	53	2nd	W	2R			
2012	NSW State League Div. 2 ↑	22	19	2	1	87	15	59	1st	W	1R			
2013	NSW State League Div. 1	22	12	1	9	43	33	37	4th	PF	3R			
2014	NSW State League Div. 1 ↑	22	16	5	1	68	23	53	1st	W	QF			
2015	NPL NSW 2 ↑	22	13	4	5	38	24	43	2nd	SF	5R			
2016	NPL NSW	22	7	2	13	40	54	23	9th		6R			
2017	NPL NSW	22	6	6	10	28	35	24	8th		W	FFA Cup – R16		
2018	NPL NSW	22	8	4	10	33	32	28	7th		RU	FFA Cup – R32		
2019	NPL NSW	22	3	2	17	12	37	11	12th					
2020	NPL NSW 2	10	3	1	6	12	20	10	7th					

^{P} Draws went to penalty shoot-outs during the 1993–1995 seasons (2 points for win, 1 point for loss).
= Premiers (premiership positions) or Champions (finals series)
= Runners-up (premiership or finals series)
1R, 2R, 3R...7R = 1st Round, 2nd Round, 3rd Round...7th Round
R32 = Round of 32
R16 = Round of 16
QF = Quarter-final
SF = Semi-final
EF = Elimination Final
PF = Preliminary Final
PO = Playoff Final

== Honours ==
=== International ===
- OFC Cup Winners Cup 1987

=== National ===
- NSL Champions 1977, 1980, 1981, 1982
- NSL Runner Up 1978, 1983, 1985
- NSL Minor Premiers 1984 (Northern Division), 1985 (Northern Division)
- Australia Cup/NSL Cup/FFA Cup Winners 1965, 1968, 1986
- Australian Club of the Decade (2) 1970s, 1980s

=== State ===
- New South Wales/NPL Minor Premiers 1968, 1970, 1971, 1973, 1974
- New South Wales/NPL Champions 1961, 1962, 1966, 1968
- New South Wales/NPL Runner Up 1973, 1974
- New South Wales Federation Cup & Waratah Cup Winners 1959, 1961, 1963, 1965, 1971, 1976, 2017
- Ampol Cup Winners 1957, 1968, 1973,
- NSW State League/NSW League Two Premiers & Champions 2014
- NSW Club Championship winners 2014, 2015
- NSW State League Division Two/NSW League Three Champions 2012
- NSW State League Division Two/NSW League Three Premiers 2012

== See also ==
- 1982 bombing of Hakoah Club

Preceded by Inaugural champions	NSL Champions; 1977	Succeeded by West Adelaide
Preceded by Marconi Stallions	NSL Champions; 1980–1982	Succeeded by St George
