= Rydalmere Lions FC =

Rydalmere Lions
- Full name: Rydalmere Lions FC
- Founded: 1979
- Ground: Rydalmere Park
- League: NSW League One
- 2026: 8th of 16

Rydalmere Lions FC are a football (soccer) club, from the suburb of Rydalmere in the city of Parramatta. The club is also known as Rydalmere Football Club and Rydalmere FC and was founded in 1979. The Men's team currently plays in the NSW League One (formerly NSW NPL2) competition, the second tier of football in New South Wales and the third tier in Australia when including the national competition, the A-League. They gained promotion to NSW NPL2 after finishing as premiers of the 2017 NSW NPL 3. In 2022, National Premier Leagues NSW 3 competition rename as NSW League Two and as end of season 2022, finish tops 8 and earning promotion back in NSW League One in 2023, due to a restructuring of Football NSW competitions.

== History ==
The club was formed as St. Joseph’s Zgharta Soccer Club in 1979. In addition to competing in the Football NSW National Premier Leagues structure, they also provide football for all age groups at the grassroots level participating in competitions within the Granville & Districts Soccer Football Association as Rydalmere FC. In 2014 the club merged with Fairfield City Lions to commencing competing in Football NSW competitions under the Rydalmere Lions FC banner.

== Club Colours and Kit ==
The club wear a predominantly red shirt with white on the sleeves and neck, red shorts and red socks.

== Seasons ==
=== Men's League ===
Season	Division	P	W	D	L	GF	GA	Pts	Position	Finals position
2012^	State League Division 1	22	6	5	11	36	56	23	10/12	-
2013^	State League Division 2	20	13	3	4	54	18	42	2/11	Finalists
2014	State League Division 2	16	9	2	5	36	16	29	4/9	Champions
2015	State League Division 1	22	12	4	6	47	33	40	2/12	?
2016	NSW NPL3	22	15	3	4	68	32	48	2/12	?
2017	NSW NPL3	26	22	1	3	95	33	67	Premiers	?
2018	NSW NPL2	26	10	5	11	40	46	35	9/14	-
2019	NSW NPL2	26	6	7	13	27	26	25	12/14 (Relegated)	-
2020	NSW NPL3									-

^ as Fairfield City Lions

=== Men's Cup ===
Season	Cup	Round
2014	2014 FFA Cup	Third Preliminary Round
2015	2015 FFA Cup	Fourth Preliminary Round
2016	2016 FFA Cup	Fourth Preliminary Round
2017	2017 FFA Cup	Third Preliminary Round
2018	2018 FFA Cup	Fourth Preliminary Round
2019	2019 FFA Cup	Fourth Preliminary Round
2020	2020 FFA Cup	Cancelled
2021	2021 FFA Cup	Fourth Preliminary Round
2022	2022 Australia Cup	Fourth Preliminary Round
