= Inner West Hawks FC =

- Full name: Inner West Hawks Football Club (Formerly Stanmore Hawks)
- Nicknames: Hawks, Kypriaki
- Ground: Arlington Oval
- Capacity: 6000
- League: NSW League Two
- 2026: 13th of 15
- Website: http://www.stanmorehawksfc.com.au/
Home colours

Inner West Hawks Football Club (formerly known as Stanmore Hawks FC) is an Australian semi-professional football club based in Stanmore, New South Wales. The club was founded in 1978 by the Greek-Cypriot community of Sydney, originally playing under the name Cyprus United. Inner West Hawks FC currently competes in the NSW League Two.

== History ==
After playing in the lower leagues of NSW football for the early 1980s, Cyprus United were introduced into the New South Wales Inter Urban Division Five for the 1985 season. In their first season in the Inner Urban league, they won two-thirds of their matches, finishing the season with twelve wins and gaining promotion. This was further followed by a string of seven consecutive promotions,.

The club was promoted to the NSW 2nd Division after winning the NSW 3rd Division in 1990. In 1992, the club experienced a magnificent season, winning the NSW 2nd Division that year, leading to Stanmore's promotion into the 1993 NSW Premier League season.

Stanmore finished 9th in 1993 and 12th in 1994, avoiding relegation as the league was set to expand to 14 teams for 1995. By the halfway mark of the 1995 season, Stanmore won just two games, drawing four others whilst having lost seven, including a 7–3 defeat to their fellow relegation zone rivals, Mount Druitt Town Rangers. Stanmore were able to pick up three more wins from their final thirteen fixtures, which wasn't enough to save them from relegation. They finished 10 points behind thirteenth placed Adamstown Rosebud.

After stagnating in the second division of NSW Football for the next decade, Stanmore went through a lean phase, wherein they were relegated again in 2007 to the third division. They stayed in the State League until the end of the 2012 season, when Football NSW created their new competition format for 2013. Because of this, Stanmore were effectively relegated to the NSW State League Division 2.

Despite losing their first match of the 2013 season, Stanmore dominated the league, winning 16 games, including a 16–0 defeat of Schofield Scorpions, before going on to win the Grand Final 1–0 over Fairfield City.

== Honours ==
- NSW League One/NSW 2nd Division

Premiers (1): 1992

- NSW Super League/NSW 2nd Division

Champions (3): 1992, 1997, 2004

- NSW State League 2/NSW 4th Division

Champions (1): 2013

- NSW State League 2/NSW 4th Division

Premiers (1): 2013

- National Premier Leagues NSW 3/NSW 3rd Division

Premiers (1): 2019
