= Blacktown Spartans FC =

Association football club in Australia

Blacktown Spartans
- Full name: Blacktown Spartans Football Club
- Founded: 2002; 24 years ago
- Ground: Blacktown International Sportspark, Blacktown Football Park; Rooty Hill, Sydney; New South Wales, Australia
- League: NSW League One
- 2026: 1st of 16 (Premiers & Promoted) NSW NPL
- Website: http://www.blacktownspartans.com.au/

The Blacktown Spartans Football Club are an Australian semi-professional association football club currently playing in the NSW League One, the 2nd tier of association football in New South Wales and the 3rd tier including the fully professional top tier, the A-League. They are based in Blacktown, located in the Greater Western Sydney area of Sydney, New South Wales.

== History ==
The Blacktown Spartans were formed in 2002 in the effort to field elite youth squads. Permission was granted to form a semi-professional team, and were included into the NSW State League Division Two, the then Third Division. In 2006 they were promoted to the NSW State League Division One after finishing first. After the 2010 season, they were promoted to NSW Super League. After finishing first in Super League in 2011 the club has been promoted to Premier League in 2012.

The 2010 season can be seen as successful for the Spartans, especially in the 2010 Waratah Cup as they have progressed to the semi-finals of the competition, and have been dubbed 'The Giant Killers' having knocked out the Rockdale City Suns in Round 3, Sydney United in the Round of 16, and Granville Rage in the Quarter Finals to book a spot in the semi-finals against New South Wales Premier League side Marconi Stallions.

In 2010 the Spartans Women were promoted from the NSW Super League to the NSW Premier League after finishing on top of the Club Championship with all five teams making the semi-finals. The Under-12s and Under-14s both won their respective Grand Finals. Following a poor 2016 NPL season, the Spartans were relegated to the second division with just 4 wins from their 22 league games, leaving them in last place.

== Honours ==
- NPL 2/NSW League One
  - Premiers (1): 2026
