= Balmain Tigers FC =

Balmain Tigers Soccer
- Full name: Balmain Tigers FC
- Nickname: Tigers
- Founded: 1986
- Ground: Wentworth Park
- Chairman: Terry Wilkinson
Home colours	Away colours

Balmain Tigers Football Club was an Australian semi-professional football club based in the Inner West suburb of Balmain in Sydney, New South Wales. The club played at Wentworth Park and trained at Birchgrove Oval.

== History ==
=== Balmain Tigers FC ===
In 1986 Roy Lawrence, an English migrant living in Sydney and Steve Hendrick formed a six-a-side football competition, inviting all Brits living in Australia to play in the competition. Following significant interest from dozens of players, Lawrence and Hendrick formed Balmain Tigers Soccer Club and entered it into the Canterbury District Premier League. The first season in the CDSFA was a huge success, finishing runners up and reaching the grand final. This early success saw the club promoted to the NSW Soccer Federation Division Seven in 1989. The next season, they continued their successful run, finishing runners-up and grand finalists. Ultimately they were promoted and continued to be promoted yearly all the way up into Division Six. In 1991, the club won Division Six, losing only two games.

In 1992 the club moved from Easton Park (Rozelle) to Lambert Park (Leichhardt) where the club promoted in Division Four.

In 1995 Lawrence retired as coach, manager and secretary. The following year, the club moved to Birchgrove Oval and reformed under new coach Bruce Allen.

In 1997 Lawrence came out of retirement and took up role of assistant coach to Bruce Allen. In 1998, ten years after the club was founded, two new coaches were appointed. Tony Dunn from Concord SC, and former Balmain SC player Jimmy Campbell, with the latter taking Balmain into Division Three, after winning the 1999 Grand Final.

The 2000 season saw Balmain finish runners up in Division Three and gained promotion to Division Two. Their remarkable rise from Division Seven culminated in 2001 with an astonishing Grand Final win on penalties after finishing runners up in the minor premiership.

In 2002 the club was invited into Division One but with mounting debts, the club found itself in dire financial straits. It was forced to sell its position to The Northern Tigers and drop down to Division Four. President Dave Grill vowed that if the club was ever presented with this opportunity again they would be ready.

A year later, the returning Jimmy Campbell led Balmain Tigers FC to second place in Division Four and promotion back to Division Three. In 2004 Balmain claimed the Minor premierships in both grades and two grand final appearances, with the reserves taking out the double and the firsts losing out on penalties. With three out of four titles secured, this was Balmain's most successful season to date.

Jimmy Campbell left the club in 2005 and the following two seasons saw a mid-table finish and a disappointing exit in the semi-finals. The Under-21s, coached by Alex Kaltenegger and his exciting brand of football, won their championship in 2006.

In 2007, Kalteneffer was promoted to the first team, his first point of business was to stun the footballing world with the signing (on a free) of Johnny Buonavoglia the ex-NSL and Sydney FC forward and by 2008 they had won the Division title and beat Camden in the Grand Final on Penalties. True to his word Dave Grill along with his committee saw that the club was ready to be promoted to Division One, where it rightfully took its place in 2009.

After a number of mid-table finishes in Division One, the 2012 squad secured 5th spot in the league, enabling Balmain to participate in the Division One final's series for the first time, where they progressed to the qualifying final.

The end of 2012 season heralded a significant shift behind the scenes with under-20s' coach Joe Di Giulio being promoted to first grade manager and Alex Kaltenegger, arguably Balmain's most successful coach, stepping down after six years in charge. Johnny Buonavoglia also left the club along with a number of first-grade players meaning Balmain would head into the 2013 season with a new look playing group and a new home in the form of Wentworth Park.

The 2013 season turned out to be the most successful in terms of highest achievement in the club's history as the new look Tigers narrowly missed out on the minor premiership, finishing third, but won their way through to the Grand Final, hosted at Jensen Oval, where they defeated Northbridge FC 2–0 after extra time to secure the NSW State League One Title. This milestone meant that from Division Five, every division the club has played in, they have either won the minor premiership, championship or both.

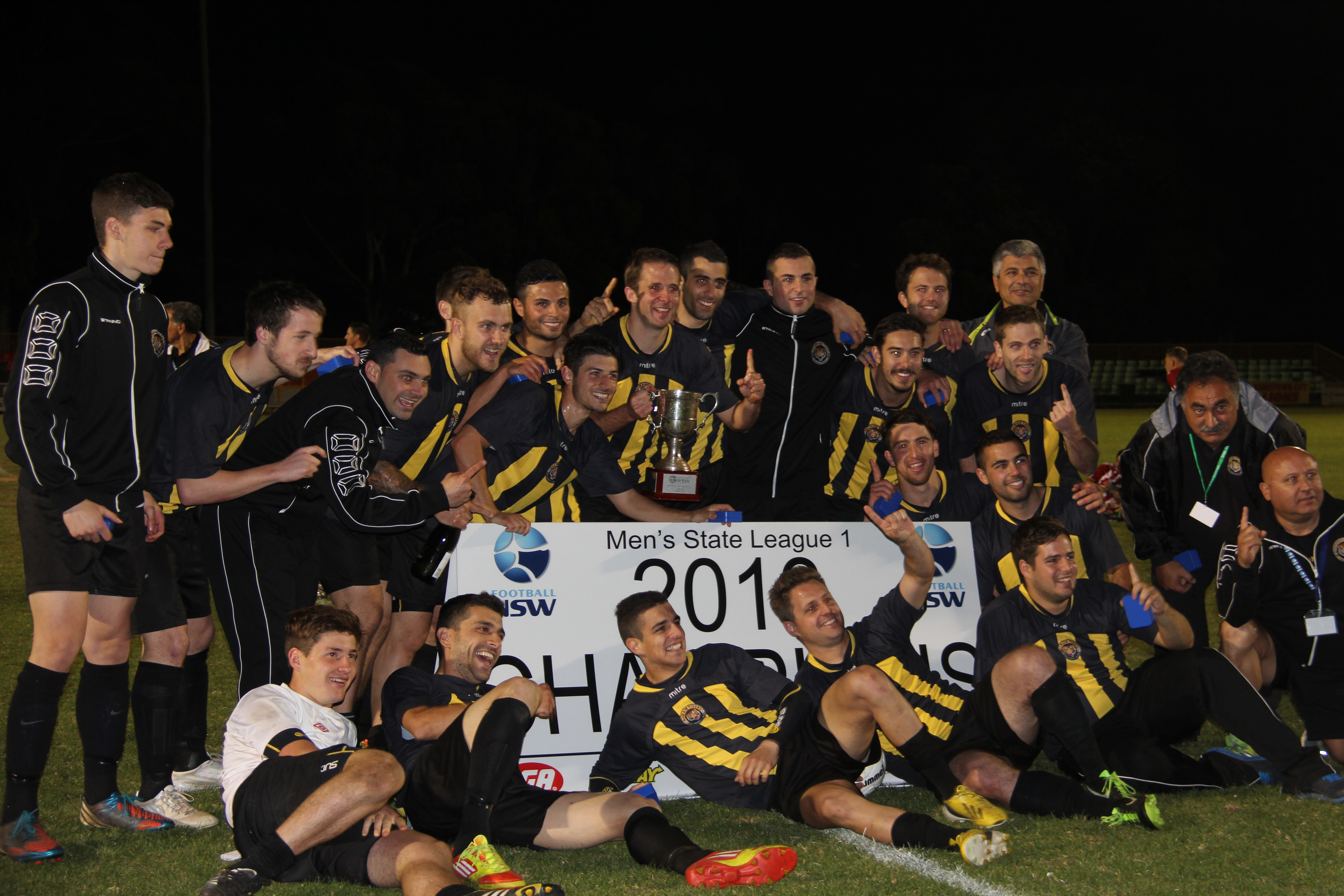
Balmain Tigers FC players celebrating their 2013 NSW State League One victory

Balmain Tigers FC created FFA Cup history, in only the competitions second year, when they qualified for the 2015 FFA Cup Round of 32 to play the A-League club Melbourne Victory. In qualifying for the national knockout stage, they beat non-league clubs Glenmore Park FC (5–0), and North Epping Rangers FC (5–0). Balmain would also defeat National Premier Leagues NSW 2 club Bankstown City (3–1), before defeating Western NSW Mariners FC 0–3.

Balmain Tigers FC previously played at Wentworth Park, Lambert Park, and occasionally played home games at Leichhardt Oval, Fraser Park and Rockdale Ilinden Sports Centre. After several years of playing in the NSW State League Division 2, they gained promotion at the end of the 2008 season to Division 1 after a hard-fought match against Camden, winning on penalties. In 2012 they made the finals series in Division 1 for the first time in the club's history and followed this up by winning the 2013 grand final and securing the State League 1 title. Balmain were the first club to qualify for the Round of 32 of the 2015 FFA Cup. They formerly played in the NSW State League, after being relegated from NSW Premier League 3. The Youth teams (U13-16) play in NSW NPL 2 Youth.

== Club colours ==
Sporting teams representing Balmain District traditionally take the colours of black and gold. These colours were first adopted by the Balmain Rowing Club on its formation in 1882, and soon became recognised as the district colours. Almost every sporting team that represents Balmain is called the Tigers, which originated with the Balmain District Rugby League Football club in 1908. Most Balmain Junior Football Club teams are black and gold. In 2005, Balmain FC changed from gold to yellow, but are still nicknamed the Tigers. In 2017, former Balmain Tigers club president Terry Wilkinson signed a three-year deal with Italian sports brand Givova to become the new club kit sponsor.

== Current Playing Squad ==
1st Grade squad as of Jan 2015

Note: Flags indicate national team as defined under FIFA eligibility rules; some limited exceptions apply. Players may hold more than one non-FIFA nationality.

No.	Pos.	Nation	Player
2	DF	ENG	Tom Hyde (Captain)
3	FW	AUS	Joel Cook
4	DF	AUS	Leo Di Giulio
5	DF	AUS	Harrison Brown
6	MF	AUS	James Kiosidis
7	MF	JPN	Tatsuya Nakadai
8	FW	AUS	Costa Fiakos
9	FW	NIR	Johnny Gowdy
10	DF	AUS	Andrew Casali
11	MF	AUS	Will Donato
13	MF	AUS	Ahmed Chandab

No.	Pos.	Nation	Player
14	DF	GER	Sergej Kunst
15	MF	AUS	Giacomo Di Mento
17	DF	AUS	Jehan Loke
18	MF	AUS	Dominic Di Mento
20	DF	AUS	Liam Cole
21	MF	USA	Gavin Wenyon
22	DF	AUS	Josh Karpes
23	GK	AUS	Anthony Costa
25	FW	AUS	Scott Tonkin
29	MF	GER	Valentin Broehl

== Season by season record ==
Season	Rank	P	W	D	L	For	Agst	GD	Points
NSW National Premier Leagues 3
2016	9	22	6	2	14	31	65	-34	20
2017	14	26	2	6	18	30	77	--47	12
NSW State League
2018	To be decided								

== Current Senior Coach Staff ==
Senior Coaching Staff as of Aug 2017

Management

- First Grade: Sash Tirovski
- Under 20s: Greg Ahladiotis
- Under 18's: Ewen Page
