= Hawkesbury City FC =

- Full name: Hawkesbury City FC
- Nickname: Hawks
- Founded: 1975 (as Hawkesbury City Soccer Club)
- Ground: David Bertenshaw Field, Richmond
- League: NSW League Two
- 2026: 8th of 15
- Website: https://www.hawksfootball.com.au

Hawkesbury City, is a semi-professional soccer club, based and located in the Hawkesbury area of New South Wales. In season 2023, they are set to compete in the NSW League Two (formerly NSW NPL 3) competition.

== Senior Team History ==
In 2018 the club finished 2nd on the table with 54 points, behind premiers St George City on 59 points. The side lost 2–1 to SD Raiders in the semi-final.

== Honours ==
- NPL NSW 3 Runners-up 2018
