= Hurstville ZFC =

Hurstville Zagreb FC
- Full name: Hurstville Zagreb Football Club
- Nickname: Hurstville Zagreb
- Short name: HZFC
- Founded: 23 November 1970; 55 years ago
- Ground: Penshurst Park; Carss Bush Park
- Capacity: 1,000
- Chairman: John Gagro
- Manager: Steve Zorić
- League: NSW League One
- 2026: 11th of 16
- Website: http://www.hurstvillezfc.com

Hurstville Zagreb FC (also known as SSC Zagreb and Hurstville ZFC) is a soccer club based in the suburban district of St George, New South Wales, Australia. The club currently competes in the NSW League One along with the NPL Juniors and on an Association level in the Football St. George competitions.

Being an Australian soccer club of Croatian heritage, it is affiliated and syndicated with the Croatian Soccer Association of Australia as well as Football Federation Australia.

== History ==
Hurstville Zagreb was established by Croatian migrants on 23 November 1970. Registered with St George FA in 1971, the club rapidly advanced through several divisions until they reached the semi-professional NSW Super League and became the second largest Croatian-heritage club in Sydney, behind Sydney United 58 FC, in the process.

In 2025, after dominantly winning Football NSW League Two, Hurstville Zagreb secured promotion to Football NSW League One with 5 games to go.

== Tournaments ==
- Australian-Croatian Soccer Tournament was hosted by Hurstville Zagreb in 1999.
- Martin Knežević Cup – a 6-a-side tournament in honor and memory of club stalwart Martin Knežević (1974–1996) that is held on an annual basis with 36 teams competing in 2017.

== Notable players ==
This club has produced some notable professionals over the decades, most of whom are of Croatian heritage or ethnicity.

Below listed are footballers who have played for Hurstville and the Australia national football team at various levels.

- (Australia) Ante Covic
- (Australia) Tomi Juric
- (Australia) Ante Milicic
- (Australia) Mark Babic
- (Australia) Ante Moric
- (Australia) Richard Pleša
- (Australia) Joe Vrkić
- (Australia) Daniel Koćina
- (Australia) Michael “Rutho” Rutherford
- (Australia) Šime

== Honours ==
NSW State League Division One/NSW League Two

- Premiership: 2025
- Runner-Up: 2003 (NSW State League Division One)

NSW Division Five

- Champions: 1988, 1989
