= Dulwich Hill FC =

Semi-professional soccer club in NSW, Australia

Dulwich Hill
- Full name: Dulwich Hill FC
- Nicknames: Dully, DHFC
- Founded: 1968
- Ground: Arlington Oval, Dulwich Hill
- Manager: Tony Valavanis
- League: NSW League One
- 2025: 13th of 16
- Website: https://www.dhfc.org.au

Dulwich Hill, is a semi-professional football club, based and located in the Dulwich Hill area of New South Wales. In 2026, they are set to compete in the Football NSW League One Men's competition and Boys Youth League 2. Dulwich Hill play their home games at Arlington Oval.

The club has strong ties to the Portuguese community with a particular emphasis on the island of Madeira. Dulwich Hill was originally established by migrants from the island of Madeira who had settled in the Inner West. The club is supported by the Portugal Madeira Club, a restaurant in neighbouring Marrickville.

Dulwich Hill has a strong rivalry with Fraser Park who are also of Portuguese heritage and have a very strong Portuguese derby when they play.

== History ==
=== 2025 ===
Dulwich Hill focused largely on replacing their departing players with a younger demographic. These younger players are Harry Jones and Andrew Di Blasio from St George FC, Jamal Belkadi, Samuel O’Connor and Isaac Hovar from Hills United, Lomeo Nicollieo from Rockdale Ilinden and Dominic Sameenang from Sydney FC Youth.

On 20 February, Dulwich Hill were drawn against Hills United in the third round of the Australia Cup Preliminary Rounds. The match was played on 18 March at Valentine Sports Park.

== Club colours ==
The club colours are blue and yellow. Their badge is heavily based on the flag of Madeira.
