= Hills United FC =

- Full name: Hills United Brumbies Football Club
- Nickname: Brumbies
- Short name: HUFC
- Founded: 1989
- Ground: Landen Stadium
- Capacity: 5,000
- Manager: Vacant
- League: NSW League One
- 2026: 5th of 16
- Website: https://www.hillsunitedfc.com.au

Hills United Football Club, also known as the Hills Brumbies, is a soccer club based in the Hills District, New South Wales, Australia. They currently play in the NSW League One competition, the second tier of New South Wales football.

== History ==
Hills United SC, which later became known as Hills United Brumbies FC, is a club that was formed in the mid-1990s through a partnership between Castle Hill United and Baulkham Hills Soccer Club, to create a pathway for elite and representative footballers in the Hills District. The club began playing out of Fred Caterson Reserve, before in the early 2000s moving to Oakville Oval for a few seasons, followed by a season at Blacktown Sports Park, before landing at their current home at Landen Stadium, shared with Blacktown City FC.

== Players ==
=== First team squad ===
As of February 2024

Note: Flags indicate national team as defined under FIFA eligibility rules; some limited exceptions apply. Players may hold more than one non-FIFA nationality.

No.	Pos.	Nation	Player
1	GK	AUS	Ryan Wood
2	DF	AUS	Rainer Smahel
3	DF	AUS	Ethan Smith
4	DF	AUS	Brian Jamba
5	DF	AUS	Daniel Petkovski
6	DF	AUS	Isaac Hovar
7	FW	AUS	Wade Giovenali
8	DF	AUS	Eoin Montford
9	FW	JPN	Yu Okubo
10	MF	AUS	Jamal Belkadi
11	FW	AUS	Anthony Frangie
12	DF	AUS	Jordon Lane
13		AUS	Cam Philp

No.	Pos.	Nation	Player
14	MF	AUS	Sam O’Connor
15		AUS	Noah Casserly
17	DF	AUS	Caleb Jackson-Brown
18	DF	AUS	Mitchell Smith
19	MF	AUS	Glen Kelshaw
20	FW	AUS	Thomas Lopez
21	GK	AUS	Emlym Cross
22	MF	AUS	Byron Ginn
24	FW	AUS	Sunday Yona
26	MF	AUS	Tommy Makko
27	FW	GER	Nicolai Müller
77	MF	AUS	Darcy Ellem
—	DF	AUS	Jared Rimmer

== Honours ==
- 2023 NSW League One Men's Premiers
- 2016 National Premier League 3 Men's Premiers

== Notable people ==
- Kyah Simon, later a Matildas player, began her career at the club.
