= Western Rage FC =

Granville Rage
- Full name: Granville Rage Football Club
- Nickname: The Rage
- Founded: 2000 (2001-2005 as Western Rage Football Club)
- Ground: Garside Park, Granville
- Owner: Vic Zappia
- Chairman: Vic Zappia
- Manager: Carlo Ianni
- League: NSW League Two
- 2025: 4th of 15
- Website: https://www.therage.com.au/
Home colours

The Granville Rage (formerly known as Western Rage 2001-2005) are an Australian semi-professional soccer club, located in the Greater Western Sydney suburb of Granville. The club was founded in 2000. They currently play in the NSW League Two Men's competition, they have played in the NSW League One (formerly NSW Super League), the second tier of football in New South Wales below the NSW Premier League.

== History ==
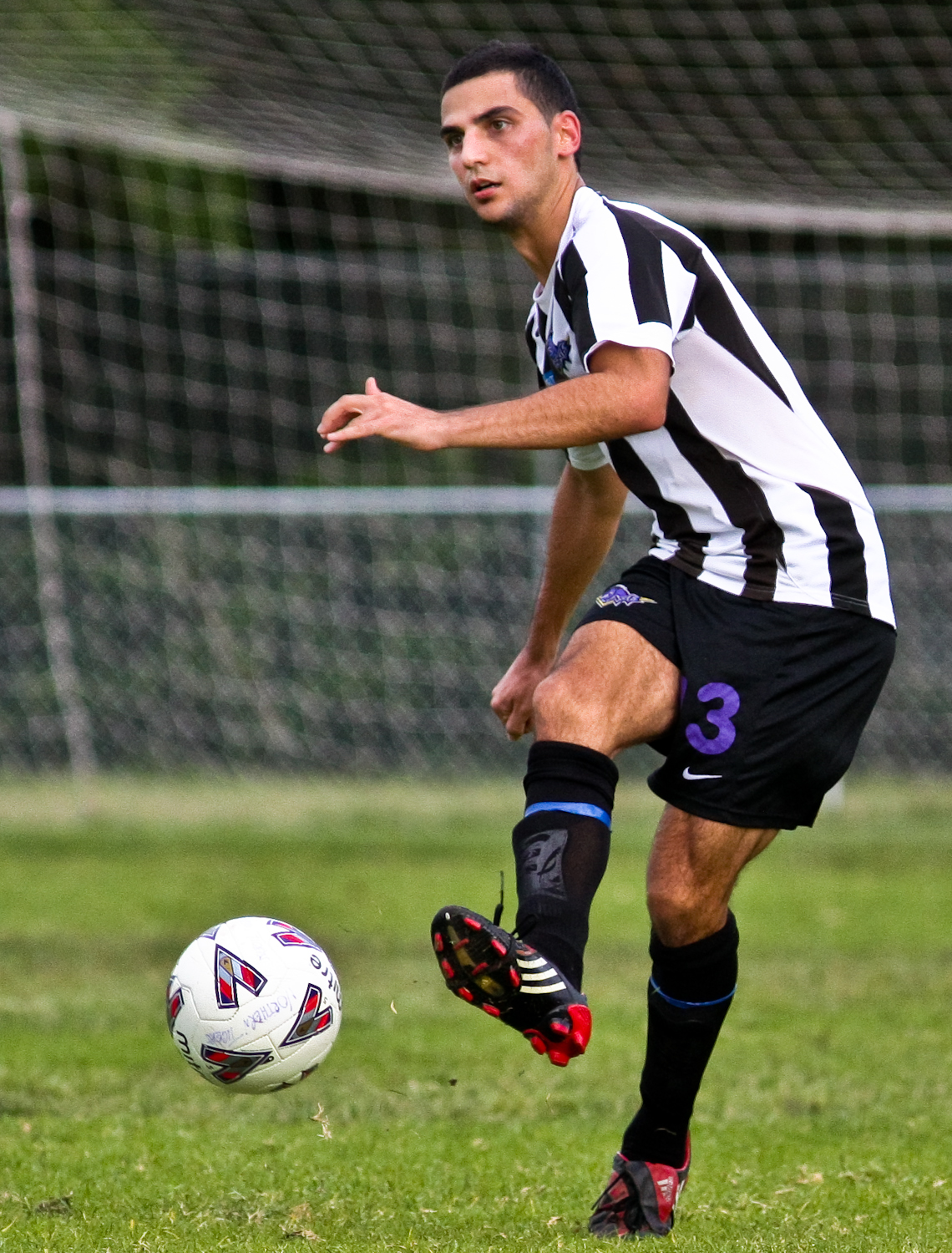
playing for Granville Rage

The club was founded in 2000, originally located in the Greater Western Sydney suburb of Prairiewood where they were known as the Prairiewood Rage. Due to the club being in the then Southern Districts Association, there were already an abundance of junior clubs in the area, making it difficult for the Rage to develop at grass-roots level. However, a lifeline appeared through the Granville Association, who allowed them into the competition. After some negotiating with the Granville Association, the club was renamed Granville Rage and re-located to their current home at Garside Park. This meant that the district regarded as the birthplace of football in Australia had – for the first time in many years – a State League operation bearing its name.

== Current squad ==
=== First team squad ===
As of 12 February 2024

Note: Flags indicate national team as defined under FIFA eligibility rules; some limited exceptions apply. Players may hold more than one non-FIFA nationality.

No.	Pos.	Nation	Player
1	GK	AUS	Samuel Bortolazzo
2	DF	AUS	Adrian Razov
3	DF	AUS	Jamie Nicolaou
4	MF	AUS	Julian Stojcevski
5	MF	AUS	Jason Najdovski
6	DF	AUS	Michael Sada
7	MF	AUS	Timothy Borg Williams
8	MF	AUS	Jacob Carluccio
9	FW	MKD	Nikola Todoroski
10	FW	AUS	Jad Moussa
11	FW	AUS	Ante Tomic

No.	Pos.	Nation	Player
12	FW	AUS	Abdullatif Ghazal
13	DF	BRA	Welkson Souza Bispo
14	MF	AUS	Timothy Trainor
15	DF	AUS	Anthony Zullo
16	MF	AUS	Nikita Andricopoulos
17	DF	AUS	Dane Vrankovic
18	FW	AUS	Mitchell Whalley
19	MF	AUS	Ogun Dullak
20	DF	AUS	Jensen Jones
21	MF	AUS	George Issa (captain)
22	GK	AUS	Branko Vidakovic
