= Fraser Park FC =

Fraser Park
- Full name: Fraser Park Football Club
- Founded: 1961
- Ground: SBS Fence Stadium, Marrickville
- Capacity: 2000
- Manager: TBC
- League: NSW League Two
- 2026: 3rd of 15
- Website: https://www.sydneyportugalclub.com.au/
Home colours	Away colours

Fraser Park FC, is an Australian soccer club with senior teams competing in the Football NSW League Two, Youth competing in the Football NSW Boys League Two and the club also has teams participating in the Football NSW Junior Development Leagues, which is the official Football NSW development program for players age 9 to 12 years. Their home ground is SBS Fence Stadium located at 100 Marrickville Rd, Marrickville.

== History ==
The Sydney Portugal Community Club was founded on 6 February 1965, a few years after the formation of the Football Club in 1961. Portuguese migrants created the “Clube Português de Sydney”, as it was originally known, in Paddington, in the heart of Sydney’s Eastern Suburbs. It was there that a small number of Portuguese immigrants began to plan the future of the club, which later became Rosebery.

The club moved to Fraser Park, which had previously been used by the Railway Institute, in the early 1990s.

== Team colours ==
The club has a strong Portuguese heritage, with its traditional home kit featuring a red shirt, green shorts and red socks, reflecting the colours of the Portugal national football team.

The away kit consists of a blue and white shirt inspired by traditional Portuguese azulejo (ceramic tile) patterns, complemented by dark blue shorts and dark blue socks.

== Notable players ==
The following is a list of Fraser Park FC players who have achieved at least two of the following criteria:

- Departed the club with a transfer fee
- Featured in the squad of sixteen of an A-League or FFA Cup grand final victory
- Made over fifty appearances professionally before or after representing Fraser Park.
- Had international caps for their respective country whilst playing for the club
- International notoriety signing
- Clint Bolton - 4 appearances for Australia. Made over 150 A-League games for Sydney FC and Melbourne Heart. Won 2006 A-League Grand Final, and 09-10 Premiership & Grand final doublewith Sydney FC.
- (Australia) Ante Juric
- Yahya El Hindi - 2 appearances for Lebanon
- Peter Pullicino - 22 appearances for Malta, over 100 appearances for Hibernians F.C. in the Maltese Premier League.
- (United States) Alex Smith - Won the 2011 NSW National Premier League with Sydney Olympic. Represented Wellington Phoenix in the A-League Men, and played professionally.

== Honours ==
- NSW NPL Boys Youth 3 Club Champions - 2022
- NSW NPL 3/NSW League Two Champions - 2017
- NSW Division 3/NSW NPL 3/NSW League Two Premiers - 1999
- NSW State League/NSW NPL 4 Champions - 2019; 2020
- NSW Division 4 Premiers - 1998
