= 2020 Football NSW season =

Football New South Wales
- Season: 2020

The Football NSW 2020 season was the eighth season of football in New South Wales under the banner of the National Premier Leagues. The competition consists of four divisions across the state of New South Wales.

All NPL and grassroots competitions were suspended for one month due to the impacts from the COVID-19 pandemic in Australia, effective 18 March to 14 April, and further extended until at least the end of May. The regular season re-commenced in a condensed format from 18 July, with promotion and relegation suspended.

== Competitions ==
=== 2020 National Premier League NSW Men's 1 ===
NPL NSW Men's 1
- Season: 2020
- Champions: Sydney United 58
- Premiers: Rockdale City Suns

The competition resumed on 31 July with a single round-robin format (11 matches) followed by a two-week finals series. The NPL Premier normally qualifies for the national NPL finals series, but the 2020 National Premier Leagues finals series was cancelled in July.

==== League table ====
Pos	Team	Pld	W	D	L	GF	GA	GD	Pts	Qualification or relegation
1	Rockdale City Suns	11	7	3	1	20	9	+11	24	2020 NSW Finals
2	Wollongong Wolves	11	8	0	3	24	14	+10	24	2020 NSW Finals
3	Sydney United 58 (C)	11	7	1	3	26	20	+6	22	2020 NSW Finals
4	Sydney Olympic	11	6	3	2	17	10	+7	21	2020 NSW Finals
5	Sydney FC Youth	11	6	1	4	26	19	+7	19	
6	Blacktown City	11	4	3	4	19	15	+4	15	
7	Marconi Stallions	11	4	2	5	14	14	0	14	
8	Manly United	11	3	3	5	14	18	−4	12	
9	North Shore Mariners	11	2	4	5	11	18	−7	10	
10	Mt Druitt Town Rangers	11	2	3	6	11	22	−11	9	
11	Western Sydney Wanderers Youth (R)	11	2	2	7	14	22	−8	8	Temporarily promoted from NPL NSW 2 mid-season (Note: Promoted from NPL2 mid-season due to the withdrawal of Sutherland Sharks. This was a temporary measure for the 2020 season only.)
12	APIA Leichhardt	11	2	1	8	12	27	−15	7	
13	Sutherland Sharks	0	0	0	0	0	0	0	0	Withdrew (Note: Withdrew during the season hiatus caused by the COVID-19 pandemic in Australia.)

Source: sportstg.com
Rules for classification: 1) points; 2) goal difference; 3) number of goals scored.
(C) Champions; (R) Relegated

==== Finals ====
Semi-finals
1	Rockdale City Suns	3
4	Sydney Olympic	0
2	Wollongong Wolves	1
3	Sydney United 58	3

Grand Final
Rockdale City Suns	3 (2)
Sydney United 58	3 (4)

=== 2020 National Premier League NSW Men's 2 ===
NPL NSW Men's 2
- Season: 2020
- Champions: Central Coast Mariners Academy
- Premiers: Central Coast Mariners Academy

The 2020 NPL NSW Men's 2 season was originally scheduled to be played over 22 rounds as a double round-robin. It resumed on 18 July as a single round-robin. Results from the first few rounds in March did not count.

Pos	Team	Pld	W	D	L	GF	GA	GD	Pts	Qualification or relegation
1	Central Coast Mariners Academy (C)	10	7	2	1	38	20	+18	23	2020 NPL NSW Men's 2 Finals
2	NWS Spirit	10	7	1	2	26	18	+8	22	2020 NPL NSW Men's 2 Finals
3	Northern Tigers	10	6	2	2	26	12	+14	20	2020 NPL NSW Men's 2 Finals
4	Bonnyrigg White Eagles	10	6	1	3	16	12	+4	19	2020 NPL NSW Men's 2 Finals
5	Blacktown Spartans	10	4	3	3	19	13	+6	15	
6	St George City	10	5	0	5	25	24	+1	15	
7	Hakoah Sydney City East	10	3	1	6	12	20	−8	10	
8	SD Raiders	10	2	3	5	21	30	−9	9	
9	St George FC	10	2	3	5	14	24	−10	9	
10	Hills United	10	2	1	7	17	27	−10	7	
11	Newcastle Jets Youth (R)	10	1	3	6	13	27	−14	6	Promoted from NPL4 mid-season (Note: Promoted from NPL4 mid-season due to the withdrawal of Mounties Wanderers.)
12	Western Sydney Wanderers Youth (P)	0	0	0	0	0	0	0	0	Promoted to NPL1 mid-season (Note: Promoted to NPL1 mid-season due to the withdrawal of NPL1 team Sutherland Sharks. This was a temporary measure for the 2020 season only.)
13	Mounties Wanderers	0	0	0	0	0	0	0	0	Withdrew (Note: Withdrew during the season hiatus caused by the COVID-19 pandemic in Australia.)

Source: sportstg.com
Rules for classification: 1) points; 2) goal difference; 3) number of goals scored.
(C) Champions; (P) Promoted; (R) Relegated

==== Finals ====
Semi-finals
2	NWS Spirit	1
3	Northern Tigers (a.e.t.)	2
1	Central Coast Mariners Academy	2
4	Bonnyrigg White Eagles	1

Grand Final
Northern Tigers	2
Central Coast Mariners Academy(a.e.t.)	6

=== 2020 National Premier League NSW Men's 3 ===
NPL NSW Men's 3
- Season: 2020
- Champions: Rydalmere Lions
- Premiers: Rydalmere Lions

The season resumed on 18 July as a single round-robin. Results from the first few rounds in March did not count.

Pos	Team	Pld	W	D	L	GF	GA	GD	Pts	Qualification or relegation
1	Rydalmere Lions (C)	11	9	1	1	32	16	+16	28	2020 NPL NSW Men's 3 Finals
2	Bankstown City Lions	11	8	0	3	30	24	+6	24	2020 NPL NSW Men's 3 Finals
3	Gladesville Ryde Magic	11	7	1	3	23	15	+8	22	2020 NPL NSW Men's 3 Finals
4	Canterbury Bankstown	11	5	4	2	20	13	+7	19	2020 NPL NSW Men's 3 Finals
5	Dunbar Rovers	11	5	1	5	26	25	+1	16	
6	Inter Lions	11	5	1	5	25	31	−6	16	
7	Stanmore Hawks	11	4	3	4	29	22	+7	15	
8	Dulwich Hill	11	3	3	5	17	30	−13	12	
9	Central Coast United	11	2	4	5	23	18	+5	10	
10	Macarthur Rams	11	3	0	8	19	33	−14	9	
11	Sydney University	11	2	2	7	12	23	−11	8	
12	Bankstown United	11	1	4	6	19	25	−6	7	

Source: sportstg.com
Rules for classification: 1) points; 2) goal difference; 3) number of goals scored.
(C) Champions

==== Finals ====
Semi-finals
1	Rydalmere Lions	4
4	Canterbury Bankstown	3
2	Bankstown City	2
3	Gladesville Ryde Magic	1

Grand Final
Rydalmere Lions	1
Bankstown City	0

=== 2020 National Premier League NSW Men's 4 ===
The season resumed on 18 July as a single round-robin. Results from the first few rounds in March did not count.

NPL NSW Men's 4
- Season: 2020
- Champions: Nepean FC
- Premiers: Fraser Park

Pos	Team	Pld	W	D	L	GF	GA	GD	Pts	Qualification or relegation
1	Fraser Park	10	7	3	0	23	5	+18	24	Qualification for the 2020 NPL NSW Men's 4 Finals
2	UNSW	10	6	3	1	16	5	+11	21	Qualification for the 2020 NPL NSW Men's 4 Finals
3	Nepean FC (C)	10	5	2	3	22	13	+9	17	Qualification for the 2020 NPL NSW Men's 4 Finals
4	Hawkesbury City	10	5	2	3	13	11	+2	17	Qualification for the 2020 NPL NSW Men's 4 Finals
5	Hurstville FC	10	3	3	4	11	12	−1	12	
6	Western NSW Mariners	10	3	3	4	14	18	−4	12	
7	South Coast Flame	10	3	3	4	11	15	−4	12	
8	Parramatta FC	10	3	2	5	14	17	−3	11	
9	Camden Tigers	10	3	2	5	12	20	−8	11	
10	Prospect United	10	1	6	3	14	19	−5	9	
11	Granville Rage	10	1	1	8	11	26	−15	4	
12	Newcastle Jets Youth (P)	0	0	0	0	0	0	0	0	Promoted to NPL2 mid-season (Note: Promoted to NPL2 mid-season due to the withdrawal of NPL2 team Mounties Wanderers.)

Source: sportstg.com
Rules for classification: 1) points; 2) goal difference; 3) number of goals scored.
(C) Champions; (P) Promoted

==== Finals ====
Semi-finals
1	Fraser Park	2
4	Hawkesbury City	0
2	UNSW	0
3	Nepean FC	2

Grand Final
Fraser Park	2 (3)
Nepean FC (p)	2 (4)

=== 2020 National Premier Leagues NSW Women's 1 ===
National Premier Leagues NSW Women's 1
- Season: 2020
- Champions: Manly United
- Premiers: Sydney University

The 2020 National Premier Leagues NSW Women's 1 was the seventh edition of the NPL NSW Women's competition to be incorporated under the National Premier Leagues banner. 12 teams competed, initially scheduled to play each other twice for a total of 22 rounds. The season resumed on 19 July as a single round-robin, but results from the first few games played in March did not count. The top four teams played off in a finals series.

==== League Table ====
Pos	Team	Pld	W	D	L	GF	GA	GD	Pts	
1	Sydney University	11	9	2	0	30	3	+27	29	2020 NPL NSW Women's Finals
2	Sydney Olympic	11	8	1	2	33	11	+22	25	2020 NPL NSW Women's Finals
3	Manly United (C)	11	7	2	2	29	10	+19	23	2020 NPL NSW Women's Finals
4	Northern Tigers	11	5	3	3	24	14	+10	18	2020 NPL NSW Women's Finals
5	Blacktown Spartans	11	5	3	3	19	11	+8	18	
6	Football NSW Institute	11	5	2	4	32	17	+15	17	
7	North West Sydney Koalas	11	5	2	4	24	18	+6	17	
8	APIA Leichhardt Tigers	11	5	2	4	20	17	+3	17	
9	Illawarra Stingrays	11	4	1	6	17	25	−8	13	
10	Macarthur Rams	11	3	0	8	17	40	−23	9	
11	Emerging Jets	11	1	0	10	5	31	−26	3	
12	Bankstown City	11	0	0	11	7	60	−53	0	

Source: sportstg.com
Rules for classification: 1) points; 2) goal difference; 3) number of goals scored.
(C) Champions

==== Finals ====
Semi-finals
1	Sydney University	4
4	Northern Tigers	0
2	Sydney Olympic	2
3	Manly United	3

Grand Final
Sydney University	1
Manly United	2

== 2020 Waratah Cup ==
NSW soccer clubs commenced the 2020 FFA Cup preliminary rounds in March, only to see it suspended due to the impacts from the coronavirus pandemic. At the time of suspension, only the first round had been played. The competition was cancelled on 3 July.
