= 2023 Football NSW season =

Football New South Wales
- Season: 2023

The 2023 Football NSW season is the 11th season of soccer in New South Wales under the banner of the National Premier Leagues. The season was the first under the revamped format which consists of three senior divisions in the state of New South Wales. Promotion and relegation were utilised for the first time after three years and the finals series was voided for this year, meaning the top-ranked team is awarded champion status.

The official schedule was released on 20 December 2022, with some matches to be rescheduled due to the 2023 FIFA Women's World Cup.

== Competitions ==
=== 2023 National Premier Leagues NSW ===
National Premier Leagues NSW
- Dates: 3 February – 27 August
- Champions: APIA Leichhardt
- Relegated: Mt Druitt Town Rangers (via play-off); Bulls FC Academy
- Matches: 240
- Goals: 759 (3.16 per match)
- Best player: Alec Urosevski (Rockdale Ilinden)
- Top goalscorer: Alec Urosevski (27 goals, Rockdale Ilinden)
- Best goalkeeper: Ivan Necevski (APIA Leichhardt)
- Biggest home win: APIA Leichhardt 6–0 Rockdale Ilinden (12 February); St George City 6–0 Mt Druitt Town Rangers (29 July)
- Biggest away win: Bulls Academy 0–5 Western Sydney Wanderers (29 July); Mt Druitt Town Rangers 0–5 Wollongong Wolves (27 August)
- Highest scoring: NWS Spirit 5–4 Wollongong Wolves (1 April); Sydney United 3–6 Western Sydney Wanderers (10 June); Marconi Stallions 5–4 Central Coast Mariners (27 August)

==== Stadiums and location ====
Team	Location	Stadium
APIA Leichhardt	Leichhardt	Lambert Park
Blacktown City	Seven Hills	Landen Stadium
Bulls FC Academy	Edensor Park	Sydney United Sports Centre
Central Coast Mariners Academy	Lisarow	Pluim Park
Central Coast Mariners Academy	Gosford	Central Coast Stadium
Manly United	Cromer	Cromer Park
Marconi Stallions	Bossley Park	Marconi Stadium
Mt Druitt Town Rangers	Emerton	Popondetta Park
NWS Spirit	Macquarie Park	Christie Park
Rockdale Ilinden	Rockdale	Rockdale Ilinden Sports Centre
St George City	Penshurst	Penshurst Park
Sutherland Sharks	Miranda	Seymour Shaw Park
Sydney FC Youth	Glenwood	Valentine Sports Park
Sydney Olympic	Belmore	Belmore Sports Ground
Sydney United	Edensor Park	Sydney United Sports Centre
Western Sydney Wanderers Youth	Rooty Hill	Wanderers Football Park
Wollongong Wolves	Wollongong	Wollongong Showground
Wollongong Wolves	Primbee	Albert Butler Memorial Park

==== Table ====
Pos	Team	Pld	W	D	L	GF	GA	GD	Pts	Qualification or relegation
1	APIA Leichhardt (C)	30	20	5	5	64	35	+29	65	
2	Rockdale Ilinden	30	18	5	7	60	45	+15	59	
3	Blacktown City	30	17	6	7	59	33	+26	57	
4	Marconi Stallions	30	17	5	8	64	35	+29	56	
5	St George City	30	14	9	7	62	40	+22	51	
6	Sydney FC Youth	30	14	4	12	49	52	−3	46	
7	Wollongong Wolves	30	11	10	9	57	43	+14	43	
8	Manly United	30	12	6	12	41	43	−2	42	
9	Sydney Olympic	30	10	9	11	51	53	−2	39	
10	Sydney United	30	11	6	13	42	48	−6	39	
11	NWS Spirit	30	11	6	13	40	53	−13	39	
12	Central Coast Mariners Academy	30	9	6	15	42	57	−15	33	
13	Western Sydney Wanderers Youth	30	8	7	15	52	61	−9	31	
14	Sutherland Sharks	30	8	7	15	21	35	−14	31	
15	Mt Druitt Town Rangers (R)	30	6	5	19	31	61	−30	23	Qualification to Relegation play-off
16	Bulls FC Academy (R)	30	3	6	21	24	65	−41	15	Relegation to 2024 NSW League One

Source: Ladder
Rules for classification: 1) Points; 2) Goal difference; 3) Number of goals scored; 4) Points gained in head-to-head record between teams; 5) Number of goals scored in head-to-head record between teams; 6) Play-off if teams concerned are equal on the basis of the above criteria
(C) Champions; (R) Relegated

==== Results ====
Home \ Away	APL	BCT	BUL	CCM	MAN	MAR	MTD	NWS	ROC	STC	SUT	SFC	SOL	SUD	WSW	WOL
APIA Leichhardt	—	1–2	2–2	1–0	3–1	0–0	2–0	5–0	6–0	3–1	1–0	3–0	3–0	1–2	2–1	3–0
Blacktown City	2–4	—	4–1	4–1	1–1	3–1	4–1	1–2	1–2	2–2	2–0	3–0	5–1	3–1	0–0	1–1
Bulls FC Academy	1–2	0–2	—	1–1	0–2	1–4	1–3	1–2	2–1	0–0	1–2	1–1	1–3	0–1	0–5	1–1
Central Coast Mariners Academy	1–2	0–1	4–2	—	0–1	2–0	1–4	4–2	1–2	0–2	2–2	2–1	2–2	2–1	1–3	2–2
Manly United	4–0	0–2	3–2	2–0	—	1–1	2–0	0–2	2–2	2–0	1–0	2–1	1–3	2–1	2–2	0–3
Marconi Stallions	1–1	2–0	5–1	5–4	3–1	—	0–1	5–1	3–1	2–3	0–2	5–0	0–1	2–1	3–3	1–0
Mt Druitt Town Rangers	1–2	0–2	2–1	1–2	1–2	1–2	—	0–0	0–3	0–3	1–2	1–2	1–1	1–0	2–1	0–5
NWS Spirit	2–1	3–2	2–0	0–1	1–3	0–2	3–1	—	0–1	2–2	2–2	1–0	0–0	3–2	1–0	5–4
Rockdale Ilinden	1–2	1–2	2–0	1–3	2–0	1–0	1–0	2–0	—	2–2	2–0	4–2	3–1	3–1	5–1	0–4
St George City	1–2	2–2	4–1	1–1	1–1	0–2	6–0	3–0	3–4	—	3–1	3–4	1–0	0–1	4–2	5–3
Sutherland Sharks	0–1	0–1	0–1	0–0	1–0	0–0	1–1	1–0	0–1	0–2	—	0–0	1–0	0–0	2–0	0–3
Sydney FC Youth	4–0	1–0	4–1	3–1	2–1	1–2	4–2	1–0	2–2	2–2	3–2	—	2–3	1–0	0–1	2–1
Sydney Olympic	3–5	1–3	1–0	5–1	2–2	2–4	3–3	2–0	0–2	0–0	3–0	1–2	—	3–3	3–1	2–2
Sydney United	1–3	1–0	0–0	2–1	2–0	3–1	3–2	2–2	3–3	0–2	2–1	0–1	0–1	—	3–6	2–1
Western Sydney Wanderers Youth	2–2	2–3	0–1	1–2	2–1	0–4	2–1	3–3	3–3	1–2	0–1	2–1	3–2	3–4	—	2–2
Wollongong Wolves	2–2	0–0	2–0	3–0	3–1	0–4	0–0	2–1	1–3	1–2	2–0	6–2	2–2	0–0	1–0	—

Source: Football NSW
Legend: Blue = home team win; Yellow = draw; Red = away team win.
For upcoming matches, an "a" indicates there is an article about the rivalry between the two participants.

==== Relegation play-off ====
3 September First leg	St George FC	1–1	Mt Druitt Town Rangers	Rockdale
15:00 AEST (UTC+10)	H.Jones 23'; C.Quilligan (yellow card) 44'; E.Souris (yellow card) 71'	Report	N.Djordjevic 34'; J.Bandiera (yellow card) 77'	Stadium: Bicentennial Park South; Referee: Craig Fisher

9 September Second leg	Mt Druitt Town Rangers	0–1 (1–2 agg.)	St George FC	Emerton
14:30 AEST (UTC+10)	N.Djordjevic (red card) 76'	Report	A.Morabito (yellow card) 4'; J.Spang 8'; M.Ahmed (yellow card) 50'	Stadium: Popondetta Park; Referee: Kurt Ams

=== 2023 League One ===
NSW League One
- Dates: 4 February – 26 August
- Champions: Hills United
- Promoted: Hills United; St George FC (via play-off)
- Relegated: Mounties Wanderers (via play-off); Central Coast United
- Matches: 240
- Goals: 788 (3.28 per match)
- Best player: Conor Quilligan (St George FC)
- Top goalscorer: Kai Denton (26 goals, Northern Tigers)
- Best goalkeeper: Ryan Woods (Hills United)
- Biggest home win: Mounties Wanderers 8–1 Macarthur Rams (8 April)
- Biggest away win: Dunbar Rovers 0–6 Bonnyrigg White Eagles (18 February); Central Coast United 0–6 SD Raiders (29 July)
- Highest scoring: Mounties Wanderers 8–1 Macarthur Rams (8 April); Hills United 5–4 Bonnyrigg White Eagles (26 August)

==== Stadiums and location ====
Team	Location	Stadium
Bankstown City	Regents Park	Jensen Oval
Blacktown Spartans	Blacktown Football Park	Bungarribee
Bonnyrigg White Eagles	Bonnyrigg	Bonnyrigg Sports Club
Canterbury Bankstown	Regents Park	Jensen Oval
Central Coast United	Lisarow	Pluim Park
Dulwich Hill	Dulwich Hill	Arlington Oval
Dunbar Rovers	Marrickville	Fraser Park
Hakoah Sydney City East	Eastgardens	Hensley Athletic Field
Hills United	Seven Hills	Landen Stadium
Inter Lions	Concord	Majors Bay Reserve
Macarthur Rams	St Helens Park	Lynwood Park
Mounties Wanderers	Cabramatta West	Cook Park
Northern Tigers	North Turramurra	North Turramurra Recreation Area
Rydalmere Lions	Rydalmere	Rydalmere Park
SD Raiders	Moorebank	Ernie Smith Reserve
St George FC	Rockdale	Rockdale Ilinden Sports Centre

==== Table ====
Pos	Team	Pld	W	D	L	GF	GA	GD	Pts	Qualification or relegation
1	Hills United (C, P)	30	20	6	4	64	38	+26	66	Promotion to National Premier Leagues NSW
2	St George FC (P)	30	17	7	6	67	40	+27	58	Qualification for promotion play-off
3	Bonnyrigg White Eagles	30	18	4	8	59	46	+13	58	
4	SD Raiders	30	17	4	9	64	43	+21	55	
5	Canterbury Bankstown	30	17	4	9	52	36	+16	55	
6	Inter Lions	30	16	4	10	55	49	+6	52	
7	Northern Tigers	30	16	3	11	62	37	+25	51	
8	Blacktown Spartans	30	12	8	10	48	45	+3	44	
9	Hakoah Sydney City East	30	10	6	14	45	48	−3	36	
10	Bankstown City	30	9	8	13	40	42	−2	35	
11	Rydalmere Lions	30	10	3	17	38	53	−15	33	
12	Dulwich Hill	30	9	5	16	43	56	−13	32	
13	Macarthur Rams	30	9	5	16	34	55	−21	32	
14	Dunbar Rovers	30	8	5	17	36	61	−25	29	
15	Mounties Wanderers (R)	30	8	3	19	44	58	−14	27	Qualification for relegation play-offs
16	Central Coast United (R)	30	4	5	21	37	81	−44	17	Relegation to 2024 NSW League Two

Source: Football NSW
Rules for classification: 1) Points; 2) Goal difference; 3) Goals scored; 4) Head-to-head points; 5) Head-to-head goals scored; 6) Play-off match
(C) Champions; (P) Promoted; (R) Relegated

==== Results ====
Home \ Away	BCL	BLS	BWE	CTB	CCU	DUL	DBR	HAK	HIL	ILN	MAC	MOU	NOR	RDL	SDR	STG
Bankstown City	—	1–3	1–2	3–0	2–0	3–1	1–0	0–0	3–3	2–1	4–0	0–1	1–1	0–1	1–1	0–1
Blacktown Spartans	1–1	—	2–2	0–3	2–1	3–3	3–3	2–1	1–1	1–2	1–1	2–0	2–2	2–0	0–1	1–4
Bonnyrigg White Eagles	2–1	1–0	—	0–2	3–0	2–1	3–1	1–3	3–1	4–1	2–1	1–4	2–2	0–0	3–0	1–0
Canterbury Bankstown	1–0	2–1	1–1	—	1–0	4–2	0–0	3–1	1–1	0–1	2–0	3–2	2–3	3–2	3–2	2–2
Central Coast United	1–1	2–3	1–2	0–2	—	4–1	0–2	1–3	1–2	1–3	1–1	1–1	0–4	2–1	0–6	1–6
Dulwich Hill	3–1	1–3	0–1	0–3	6–0	—	2–1	0–3	1–1	0–2	2–1	4–3	2–1	0–1	4–3	1–1
Dunbar Rovers	1–1	2–1	0–6	3–1	1–5	2–1	—	2–2	1–1	1–3	1–2	2–0	0–1	2–1	0–1	0–3
Hakoah Sydney City East	4–0	1–1	1–2	2–0	3–0	0–3	3–1	—	0–2	3–2	2–2	1–5	0–1	0–1	0–2	1–2
Hills United	2–0	4–2	5–4	1–0	4–1	1–0	3–2	3–2	—	1–0	4–0	2–1	1–2	4–3	3–2	4–1
Inter Lions	1–4	2–1	4–0	2–1	4–3	2–0	0–2	2–2	2–1	—	1–1	1–1	1–0	6–1	2–3	1–1
Macarthur Rams	2–1	0–2	0–3 (Note: The match between Macarthur Rams and Bonnyrigg White Eagles was abandoned due to alleged breaches of disciplinary regulations. Bonnyrigg White Eagles were awarded a 3–0 win since Macarthur Rams' club officials were responsible for match abandonment.)	0–1	2–0	0–0	3–0	2–3	1–2	3–4	—	1–0	0–1	0–2	2–0	2–1
Mounties Wanderers	0–1	0–2	2–3	0–4	2–1	3–2	0–4	0–1	0–1	2–1	8–1	—	0–4	0–2	2–3	2–2
Northern Tigers	2–4	0–1	4–0	4–1	5–1	0–1	4–2	2–0	0–1	5–0	2–3	3–1	—	3–2	1–2	3–0
Rydalmere Lions	2–0	0–2	1–3	0–2	2–2	1–1	4–0	2–1	0–3	1–2	2–0	0–3	2–1	—	0–2	2–3
SD Raiders	3–3	1–3	3–0	0–2	2–3	2–1	5–0	3–1	2–2	1–2	2–1	1–0	3–1	3–0	—	2–2
St George FC	2–0	3–0	4–2	3–2	4–4	4–0	1–0	1–1	2–0	3–0	1–2	4–1	2–0	3–2	1–3	—

Source: Football NSW
Legend: Blue = home team win; Yellow = draw; Red = away team win.
For upcoming matches, an "a" indicates there is an article about the rivalry between the two participants.

==== Relegation play-off ====
1 September First leg	Nepean FC	3–2	Mounties Wanderers	Rooty Hill
20:00 AEST (UTC+10)	J.Hoban (yellow card) 10'; P.Laxamana (yellow card) 40' (yellow-red card) 80'; M.Crossley 42'; L.Sepping 45' (pen.), 59'; K.Soares (yellow card) 53'; M.Ingram (yellow card) 69'	Report	K.Maliet 18', (yellow card) 53'; A.Holder (yellow card) 45'; S.Maeta (yellow card) 58'; A.Schroeder 61'	Stadium: Wanderers Football Park; Referee: Ivica Covic

9 September Second leg	Mounties Wanderers	0–0 (2–3 agg.)	Nepean FC	Cabramatta West
19:00 AEST (UTC+10)	P.Da (yellow card) 18'; F.Williamson (yellow card) 75'	Report	K.Soares (yellow card) 33'; L.Abdo (yellow card) 49'	Stadium: Cook Park; Referee: Danny Horstead

=== 2023 League Two ===
NSW League Two
- Dates: 3 February – 26 August
- Champions: UNSW FC
- Promoted: UNSW FC; Nepean FC (via play-off)
- Matches: 210
- Goals: 691 (3.29 per match)
- Best player: Mitchell Cross (Bankstown United)
- Top goalscorer: Kevin Lopes (23 goals, UNSW FC)
- Best goalkeeper: Justin Biega (Nepean FC)
- Biggest home win: 5–0 (four matches)
- Biggest away win: Hurstville FC 1–6 Newcastle Jets (21 May)
- Highest scoring: Camden Tigers 5–4 Hurstville FC (4 March); Western Rage 4–5 UNSW FC (15 July); Camden Tigers 6–3 Bankstown United (26 August)

==== Stadiums and location ====
Team	Location	Stadium
Bankstown United	Padstow	Padstow Park
Camden Tigers	Camden	Ron Dine Memorial Reserve
Fraser Park	Marrickville	Fraser Park
Gladesville Ryde Magic	Macquarie Park	Christie Park
Hawkesbury City	Richmond Lowlands	David Bertenshaw Field
Hurstville FC	Penshurst	Penshurst Park
Inner West Hawks	Dulwich Hill	Arlington Oval
Nepean FC	Rooty Hill	Wanderers Football Park
Newcastle Jets Youth	Speers Point	Lake Macquarie Regional Facility
Parramatta FC	Auburn	Melita Stadium
Prospect United	Prospect	William Lawson Park
South Coast Flame	Kembla Grange	Sir Ian McLennan Oval
Sydney University	Camperdown	Sydney University Oval
UNSW FC	Kensington	The Village Green
Western Rage	Rydalmere	Rydalmere Park

==== Table ====
Pos	Team	Pld	W	D	L	GF	GA	GD	Pts	Qualification or relegation
1	UNSW FC (C, P)	28	19	5	4	62	32	+30	62	Promotion to NSW League One
2	Nepean FC (P)	28	17	6	5	55	23	+32	57	Qualification for promotion play-off
3	Newcastle Jets Youth	28	16	5	7	68	33	+35	53	
4	Gladesville Ryde Magic	28	13	7	8	62	49	+13	46	
5	Fraser Park	28	12	7	9	34	43	−9	43	
6	Prospect United	28	12	5	11	40	41	−1	41	
7	Camden Tigers	28	12	3	13	58	61	−3	39	
8	Hawkesbury City	28	11	5	12	46	55	−9	38	
9	Bankstown United	28	11	4	13	50	48	+2	37	
10	Hurstville FC	28	9	7	12	36	47	−11	34	
11	South Coast Flame	28	9	6	13	40	46	−6	33	
12	Western Rage	28	7	7	14	35	62	−27	28	
13	Sydney University	28	5	10	13	37	49	−12	25	
14	Parramatta FC	28	7	4	17	38	56	−18	25	
15	Inner West Hawks	28	5	9	14	30	46	−16	24	

Source: Football NSW
Rules for classification: 1) Points; 2) Goal difference; 3) Goals scored; 4) Head-to-head points; 5) Head-to-head goals scored; 6) Play-off match
(C) Champions; (P) Promoted

=== 2023 National Premier Leagues NSW Women's ===
National Premier Leagues NSW Women's
- Season: 2023
- Champions: Macarthur Rams
- Premiers: APIA Leichhardt

The 2023 National Premier Leagues NSW Women's was the 10th edition of the NPL NSW Women's competition to be incorporated under the National Premier Leagues banner. 14 teams competed, playing each other twice for a total of 26 rounds. The top four teams played-off in a finals series.

==== League Table ====
Pos	Team	Pld	W	D	L	GF	GA	GD	Pts	
1	APIA Leichhardt	26	19	5	2	64	26	+38	62	2023 NPL NSW Women's Finals
2	Macarthur Rams (C)	26	18	5	3	70	24	+46	59	2023 NPL NSW Women's Finals
3	NWS Spirit	26	14	5	7	49	35	+14	47	2023 NPL NSW Women's Finals
4	Bulls FC Academy	26	12	7	7	44	31	+13	43	2023 NPL NSW Women's Finals
5	Northern Tigers	26	12	6	8	38	29	+9	42	
6	Illawarra Stingrays	26	11	6	9	39	35	+4	39	
7	Sydney Olympic	26	11	5	10	36	34	+2	38	
8	Bankstown City	26	8	13	5	41	27	+14	37	
9	Gladesville Ravens	26	8	9	9	30	31	−1	33	
10	Sydney University	26	7	7	12	41	42	−1	28	
11	Manly United	26	5	11	10	27	35	−8	26	
12	Football NSW Institute	26	6	6	14	22	44	−22	24	
13	Blacktown Spartans	26	6	1	19	21	59	−38	19	
14	Emerging Jets	26	0	4	22	31	101	−70	4	

Source: Ladder
Rules for classification: 1) points; 2) goal difference; 3) number of goals scored.
(C) Champions

==== Finals ====
Semi-final
1	APIA Leichhardt	1
4	Bulls FC Academy	2
2	Macarthur Rams	3
3	NWS Spirit	0

Grand final
Bulls FC Academy	0
Macarthur Rams	2

== Awards ==
The awards gala was hosted in September 2023 with over 900 guests attending, including players, coaches and officials of Football NSW. Jon Pillemer was awarded the Charles Valentine Award for his 37 years spent with Hakoah Sydney City East, both as a player and staff.

=== 1st Grade ===
Club awards
League	Fair Play Award	Club Championship	
League	Fair Play Award	Club	Points
NPL NSW	Sydney FC	Rockdale Ilinden	340
League One	Hills United	Hills United	386
League Two	Gladesville Ryde Magic	UNSW FC	354

Referee awards
League	Assistant Referee of the Year	Referee of the Year
NPL NSW	Cameron Wright	Sam Kelly

NPL NSW Goal of the Year
Player	Club	Date
Richard Darko	NWS Spirit	5–4 vs WOL (1 April)

Individual awards
L	Golden Boot			Goalkeeper of the Year		Player of the Year		Coach of the Year
L	Player	Club	Goals	Player	Club	Player	Club	Coach of the Year
NPL	Alec Urosevski	Rockdale Ilinden	27	Ivan Necevski	APIA Leichhardt	Alec Urosevski	Rockdale Ilinden	Franco Parisi (APIA)
L1	Kai Denton	Northern Tigers	26	Ryan Woods	Hills United	Conor Quilligan	St George FC	Luke Casserly (HIL)
L2	Kevin Lopes	UNSW FC	23	Justin Biega	Nepean FC	Mitchell Cross	Bankstown United	Gabriel Knowles (UNS)

=== Under-20s ===
League	Golden Boot			Player of the year	
League	Player(s)	Club	Goals	Player	Club
NPL NSW	Thomas Lopez	Western Sydney Wanderers	21	Max Middleby	Central Coast Mariners
League One	Samuel Tzanakes	Dunbar Rovers	24	Sebastian Cerecedo	St George FC
League Two	Joel Corcoran	Hawkesbury City	22	Jayden Ashbourne	Newcastle Jets
League Two	Seisa Melbourne	Fraser Park	22	Jayden Ashbourne	Newcastle Jets
