= New South Wales Regional Leagues =

New South Regional Leagues
- Country: Australia
- Level on pyramid: 5
- Promotion to: None

The New South Wales regional leagues are the fourth level of soccer in New South Wales, and the fifth nationally. The league consists of nineteen separate regional senior leagues and is administered by Football New South Wales. The Albury-Wodonga Football Association, which in addition to clubs from southern NSW, includes several clubs based in northern Victoria, is also run by Football NSW.

There is no promotion to NSW State League however clubs may apply to join.

== Associations and branches ==
There are sixteen separate regional metropolitan district associations and three branches (consisting of numerous smaller associations) which operate under the auspices of Football NSW. The metropolitan districts can usually be divided into smaller regions for ease of administration and also for junior state competitions.

== Metropolitan East ==
There are three associations which make up Metropolitan East. They are Canterbury District Soccer Football Association, Eastern Suburbs Football Association and St George Football Association. The structure for the associations are as follows:

Tier-1: (Level 5)

- Bill Brackenbury Cup (Canterbury)
- Premier League Firsts (Eastern Suburbs)
- Premier League/Reserves (St George)

Tier-2: (Level 6)

- All Age Division 1 & All Age Sunday 1 (Canterbury, Eastern Suburbs)
- All Age Division 1 & All Age Saturday 1(Eastern Suburbs)
- Premier League 2/Reserves (St George)

Lower Tiers: (Level 7 onwards)

- All Age Divisions 2–16 & All Age Sunday 2 (Canterbury)
- All Age Divisions 2-7 (Sun) & Division 2-7 (Sat) (Eastern Suburbs)
- All Ages A–H (St George)

Overage 35's:

- Divisions 1–8 (Canterbury)
- Championship & Division 2 (Eastern Suburbs)
- Divisions A–D (St George)

Overage 45's:

- Divisions 1–6 (Canterbury)
- Championship & Division 2 (Eastern Suburbs)
- Divisions A-B (St George)

**Overage 50's: (Canterbury only)**

- Divisions 1–3 (Canterbury)

Women Tier-1:

- Grace Martin Trophy (Canterbury)
- Premier League First Grade (Eastern Suburbs)
- Premier Women's League (St George)

Women Lower Tiers:

- Divisions 1–5 (Canterbury)
- Divisions 1-4 (Eastern Suburbs)
- Divisions A–C (St George)

Women's Overage:

- Overage 35's Divisions 1-4 (Canterbury)
- Overage 30's Championship (Eastern Suburbs)
- Overage 30's A & B (St George)

Clubs in the different districts in 2016 are as follows:

=== Canterbury District Soccer Football Association ===
The ten clubs in bold compete in the Bill Brackenbury Cup.

- Abbotsford JSC
- **ACU FC**
- APIA Leichhardt Tigers Juniors FC (Note: APIA Leichhardt are a member of the CDSFA, however do not field any sides in Men's All Age competitions as they participate in the National Premier Leagues.)
- Ashfield Pirates FC
- Australian National Sports Lakemba
- **Balmain DFC**
- **Belmore Eagles FC**
- Bexley Lions FC
- Burwood FC
- Canterbury Lions FC
- CCIW United
- Concord JFC
- Cooks River Titans FC
- Earlwood Wanderers FC
- **Enfield Rovers FC**
- Future Leaders Australia FC
- FC Five Dock
- **Hurlstone Park Wanderers FC**
- Inner West Counsel FC
- **Inter Lions SC**
- Lakemba FC Sports
- Leichhardt Saints FC
- **Marrickville FC**
- **MRP FC**
- Punchbowl United FC
- Roselands SC
- Russell Lea Women's SC
- **St Barnabas FC**
- St Patricks FC
- **Strathfield FC**
- Sydney Rangers FC
- Sydney University FC

=== Eastern Suburbs Football Association ===
The six clubs in bold compete in the First Grade Championship.

- Barnstoneworth
- **Coogee United**
- Dunbar Rovers
- Easts FC
- **Glebe Gorillas**
- **Glebe Wanderers**
- Heffron Hawks
- Kytherians
- Lions FC
- Lokomotiv Cove FC
- Maccabi Hakoah
- Maroubra United
- Mascot Kings
- Pagewood-Botany FC
- **Phoenix FC**
- Queens Park
- **Randwick City FC**
- Reddam House FC
- Redfern Raiders
- South East Eagles FC
- Sydney CBD FC
- University of NSW FC
- **Waverley Old Boys**

=== Football St George ===
The ten clubs in bold compete in the Premier League 1.

- All Saints Oatley West
- **Arncliffe Aurora FC**
- **Banksia Tigers FC**
- Bexley North FC
- Carlton Rovers
- Carss Park FC
- **Connells Point FC**
- **Dolls Point FC**
- **Forest Rangers FC**
- **Glory FC**
- Hurstville ZFC
- **Hurstville City Minotaurs**
- Kogarah Waratah
- Lugarno FC
- Oatley RSL
- Peakhurst United
- Penshurst West FC
- Ramsgate RSL FC
- Rockdale Raiders
- **Rockdale City Suns FC**
- **San Souci FC**
- **Scots FC**
- St George Warriors FC

== Metropolitan Far North ==
There are two districts which form the Metropolitan Far North. They are Central Coast Football and Northern Suburbs Football Association. The representative teams are Central Coast Lightning (and now Central Coast Mariners Academy) and Northern Tigers FC respectively. Both teams compete in the National Premier Leagues NSW 2. The structure of the associations are as follows:

Tier-1:

- Premier League/Reserves (Central Coast, Northern Suburbs)

Tier-2:

- Division 1/Reserves (Central Coast)
- All Age Division 2/Reserves (Northern Suburbs)

Lower Tiers:

- All Age Divisions 1–10 (Central Coast)
- All Age Divisions 3/Reserves, Divisions 4-10 (Northern Suburbs)

Over 35's:

- Divisions A, B–D North/South, E (Central Coast)
- Divisions 1-5 (Northern Suburbs)

Over 45's:

- Divisions A-C, D North/South (Central Coast)
- Divisions 1-2, Divisions 3-5/Reserves (Northern Suburbs)

Over 55's:

- N/A (Central Coast)
- Division 1 (Northern Suburbs)

Women Tier-1:

- Premier League (Central Coast/Northern Suburbs)

Women Lower Tiers:

- Division 1, All Age Divisions 1–7 (Central Coast)
- All Age Divisions 2-4 (Northern Suburbs)

Women's Overage:

- Overage 35's Divisions A-B (Central Coast)
- Overage 30's Divisions 1-4, Overage 45's Divisions 1-2 (Northern Suburbs)

The member clubs for each association are listed below.

=== Central Coast Football ===
The ten clubs in bold compete in Premier League (BPL).

- **Avoca FC**
- Barnstoneworth United FC Central Coast
- **Berkeley Vale SC**
- **Budgewoi FC**
- Doyalson-Wyee SC
- East Gosford FC
- Gosford City FC
- Gwandalan FC
- **Kanwal-Warnervale FC**
- Kariong United FC
- **Killarney District SC**
- Kincumber FC
- Mountains District FC
- **Ourimbah United FC**
- **Southern & Ettalong FC**
- **Terrigal United FC**
- The Entrance–Bateau Bay FC
- Toukley-Gorokan SC
- Tuggerah United FC
- Umina United SC
- **Woongarrah FC**
- Woy Woy FC
- **Wyoming FC**
- Wyong SC

=== Northern Suburbs Football Association ===
The ten clubs in bold compete in the Premier League.

- Asquith
- **Berowra FC**
- Brooklyn
- **Chatswood Rangers**
- Gordon
- Greenwich
- **Hornsby Heights**
- Hornsby RSL
- **Kissing Point**
- **Knox United**
- **Lane Cove**
- Lane Cove West
- **Lindfield**
- Mongo FC
- Mt Colah
- North Sydney BHS
- North Sydney United
- North Turramurra
- **Northbridge FC**
- Northern Tigers FC (Note: Northern Tigers are owned and run by the NSFA. They do not field any sides in Men's All Age competitions as they participate in the National Premier Leagues NSW 2.)
- Old Barker FC
- Prouille FC
- Sacred Heart Mosman
- Sacred Heart Pymble
- St Ives
- St Michaels
- Turrumurra United
- UTS FC
- **West Pymble**
- **Willoughby Dalleys**

== Metropolitan Far South ==
There are two districts which form the Metropolitan Far South. They are Football South Coast and Sutherland Shire Football Association (SSFA). The representative teams for the associations are Wollongong Wolves and Sutherland Sharks. The structure of the associations are as follows:

Tier-1:

- Premier League Firsts/Seconds/Youth (Football South Coast)
- Premier League/Reserves (SSFA)

Tier-2:

- District League Firsts/Seconds/Youth (Football South Coast)
- All Age Division 2 (SSFA)

Lower Tiers:

- All Age Divisions 1 Firsts/Seconds, Divisions 2–4 (Football South Coast)
- All Age Divisions 3–16 (SSFA)

Over 35's:

- Divisions 1–4 (Football South Coast)
- Divisions A–E (SSFA)

Over 45's:

- Divisions 1–2 (Football South Coast)
- Divisions A-F (SSFA)

Women's Tier 1:

- Premier League Firsts/Seconds/Youth (Football South Coast)
- Premier League (SSFA)

Lower Tiers:

- All Age Divisions 1–4 (Football South Coast)
- All Age Divisions B–G (SSFA)

Overage:

- Over 30's Divisions 1-2, Over 40's Division 1 (Football South Coast)
- Overage 40 Divisions A–C (SSFA)

Below are lists of member clubs for each association.

=== Football South Coast ===
There are 31 member clubs that compete over three premier tiers in the district.

Men's Premier League 1 Clubs:

- Albion Park White Eagles
- Berkeley Sports
- Bulli FC
- Coniston FC
- Cringila Lions FC
- Helensburgh Thistle
- Oak Flats Falcons
- Port Kembla
- Shellharbour FC
- South Coast United SC
- Wollongong Olympic
- Wollongong United

Men's Premier League 2 Clubs:

- Balgownie Rangers
- Dandaloo FC
- Fernhill
- Picton Rangers
- Shellharbour City
- Shoalhaven DFA
- Tarrawanna Blueys
- Thirroul FC
- Unanderra Hearts
- UOW FC

Men's Premier League 3 Clubs:

- Albion Park FC
- Bellambi Rosellas
- Coledale Waves
- Corrimal Rangers
- Figtree FC
- Gerringong Breakers
- Highlands FC
- Warilla Wanderers
- Woonona Sharks FC

Other Clubs:

- Albion Park Cows FC
- Fairy Meadow United FC
- Jamberoo Ravens FC
- Kiama Quarriers FC
- Moss Vale SC
- Northern FC
- Oak Flats Kraken
- Port Pumas FC
- Russell Vale FC
- United Wolves AFC

=== Sutherland Shire Football Association ===
The ten clubs in bold compete in the Premier League.

- Bangor FC
- Barden Ridgebacks FC
- **Bonnet Bay FC**
- Bundeena-Maianbar Breakers
- **Caringbah Redbacks FC**
- **Como Jannali SC**
- **Cronulla Seagulls FC**
- Cronulla RSL Stingrays FC
- Engadine Crusaders FC
- **Engadine Eagles FC**
- **Georges River Tigers**
- Grays Point
- Gwawley Bay FC
- **Gymea United FC**
- Heathcote Waratah FC
- **Kirrawee Kangaroos FC**
- **Lilli Pilli FC**
- Loftus Yarrawarrah
- Marton Hammers FC
- Menai Hawks FC
- Miranda Magpies FC
- North Sutherland Rockets SC
- St. John Bosco YCFC
- St. Patricks Sutherland FC
- Sutherland Titans FC
- **Sylvania Heights FC**

== Metropolitan North ==
There are two associations which make up Metropolitan North. They are the North West Sydney Football Association (NWSFA) and the Manly Warringah Football Association (MWFA). The structure for the associations are as follows:

Tier-1:

- Premier League/Reserves (NWSFA)
- Premier League/Reserves (MWFA)

Tier-2:

- Super League/Reserves (NWSFA)
- All Age Division 1/Reserves (MWFA)

Lower tiers:

- All Age Divisions 1–12 (NWSFA)
- All Age Divisions 2–7 (MWFA)

Overage 35's:

- Divisions 1–5 (NWSFA)
- Divisions 1-4 (MWFA)

Overage 45's:

- Divisions 1–5 (NWSFA)
- Divisions 1–5 (MWFA)

Overage 55's (NWSFA only):

- Divisions 1–2 (NWSFA)

Women's Tier 1:

- Premier League/Reserves (NWSFA)
- Premier League/Reserves (MWFA)

Lower Tiers:

- All Age Divisions 1–5 (NWSFA)
- All Age Divisions 1–4 (MWFA)

Overage:

- O-30's 1–2 (NWSFA)
- O-40's 1–2 (NWSFA)
- O-40's 1–3 (MWFA)

=== North West Football Association ===
The ten teams in bold compete in the Premier League.

- All Saints Hunters Hill FC
- Ararat FC
- Beecroft FC
- **Eastwood St Andrews AFC**
- **Epping Eastwood FC**
- **Epping FC**
- Flying Bats FC
- Gladesville Ravens
- Gladesville Sharks
- Hills Hawks
- King Old Boys FC
- **Macquarie Dragons**
- Macquarie University
- Melrose Park FC
- Mercy College
- Mount St Benedict
- **Normanhurst Eagles**
- North Epping Rangers
- North Ryde
- **Northern Homenetmen FC**
- Old Ignatians FC
- **Pennant Hills FC**
- **Putney Rangers**
- Redbacks FC
- Redfield Lions FC
- Roselea FC
- Ryde Cross SC
- Ryde Panthers
- Ryde Saints United
- St. Patricks FC
- Thornleigh Thunder FC
- **West Pennant Hills-Cherrybrook**
- West Ryde Eagles
- **West Ryde Rovers**

=== Manly Warringah Football Association ===
The ten clubs in bold compete in the Premier League.

- **Allambie Beacon Hill United**
- Avalon SC
- Brookvale FC
- BTH Raiders
- **Collaroy Cromer Strikers**
- Curl Curl Youth
- Dee Why FC
- **Forest Killarney**
- **Harbord Seasiders**
- Manly United
- **Manly Vale FC**
- **Mosman FC**
- **Narrabeen FC**
- **Pittwater RSL**
- Seaforth FC
- **St Augustines**
- **Wakehurst FC**

== Metropolitan South ==
There are three associations which make up Metropolitan North. They are Bankstown District Amateur Football Association, Macarthur District Football Association and Southern Districts Football Association (SDFA). The respective representative sides are Bankstown United FC (who compete in the NSW State League), Macarthur Rams (who compete in the National Premier Leagues NSW 2) and Southern Districts Raiders (who also compete in the NSW State League). The structure for the associations are as follows:

Tier-1:

- Premier League (Bankstown)
- M-League Firsts/Reserves/Colts (Macarthur)
- Premier League/U23's (SDFA)

Tier-2:

- District League (Bankstown)
- All Age Division 2 (Macarthur)
- All Age Division 2 Green/Red (SDFA)

Lower Tiers:

- All Age 1-8 (Bankstown)
- All Age Divisions 2–10 (Macarthur)
- All Age Division 3 Green/Red, then Divisions 4–10 (SDFA)

Overage:

- O-45s Division 1 (Bankstown)
- O-35 Divisions 1–5 (Macarthur)
- O-35 Split 1–3 & Green/Red (SDFA)

Women:

- All Age Divisions 1–3 (Bankstown)
- M-League, then All Age Divisions 2-4 (Macarthur)
- Women's Super League, then All Age Divisions 3-4 (SDSFA)
- Over 30's Divisions 1-2 (SDFA)

=== Bankstown District Amateur Football Association ===
The eight clubs compete in the Premier League.

- **Bankstown Sports Stars FC**
- **Bankstown Sports Strikers FC**
- Bass Hill Rangers SC
- Birrong Sports FC
- **Central Sydney Wolves FC**
- Condell Park FC
- East Bankstown FC
- Georges River Thistle
- **Greenacre Eagles**
- Milperra Lions
- North Bankstown SC
- **Padstow Hornets FC**
- **Padstow United SC**
- **Panania RSL Diggers SC**
- Revesby Workers FC
- Spears Sports Club
- St Christophers FC
- **Yagoona Lions FC**

=== Macarthur District Football Association ===
The ten clubs in bold compete in the M-League.

- Appin United
- Bardia FC
- Bradbury-Ambarvale Bears
- Burragorang DSC
- Camden Falcons FC
- **Camden Tigers**
- Campbelltown Cobras
- Campbelltown Collegians
- Campbelltown Uniting Church
- Douglas Park-Wilton FC
- **Eschol Park Wolves**
- Glenfield Lions
- **Gregory Hills FC**
- **Gunners SC**
- **Harrington United FC**
- Ingleburn Eagles
- Macarthur Magic
- Minto DSC
- **Mt Annan Mustangs SC**
- **Narellan Rangers**
- **Oran Park Rovers**
- Picton Rangers
- Ruse FC
- **St Mary's Eagle Vale SC**
- **Tahmoor Taipans**
- Wilton Warriors

=== Southern Districts Soccer Football Association ===
The nineclubs compete in the Premier League.

- **AC United**
- Austral Sports
- **Bonnyrigg Juniors SC**
- Bossley Sports
- Chipping Norton FC
- Colo Colo FC
- FC Eagles Sydney
- **Fairfield Bulls FC**
- Fairfield Eagles
- Fairfield Hotspurs
- **Fairfield Pats FC**
- **FC Bossy Liverpool**
- Green Island FC
- Horsley Park United
- **Kemps Creek**
- Lansvale United
- Leppington Lions
- Liverpool City Robins
- Liverpool Olympic
- Liverpool Rangers
- Liverpool Spears
- Liverpool Warriors
- Marconi Juniors
- **Moorebank Sports**
- Mounties Juniors
- South West Wanderers
- Sporting Rovers
- Sydney Juniors FC
- **Western Condors**
- Wetherill Park Westerners
- **White City**

== Metropolitan West ==
There are four districts which makeup Metropolitan West: Blacktown & Districts Soccer Football Association, Granville & Districts Soccer Football Association, Hills Soccer Football Association and Nepean Football Association. The representative teams for the associations are Blacktown Spartans, Parramatta FC, Hills United FC and Nepean FC respectively. The structure of the associations are as follows:

Tier-1:

- Premier League 1/Reserves (Blacktown & Districts)
- X-League 1 (Granville & Districts)
- Premier League/Reserves (Hills)
- Waratah League/Reserves (Nepean)

Tier-2:

- Premier League 2/Reserves (Blacktown & Districts)
- Super League/Reserves (Granville & Districts only)
- All Age Division 3 (Hills)
- All Age Division 2 (Nepean)

Tier-3:

- All Age Divisions 1-6 (Blacktown & Districts)
- All Age Divisions 1-6 (Granville & Districts)
- All Age Divisions 3–12 (Hills)
- All Age Divisions 3–11 (Nepean)

Overage-35's:

- Blacktown Divisions 1–5
- Nepean Divisions 1–5
- Divisions 1-3 & Friday Divisions 1-2 (Hills)

Overage-45's:

- Division 1 (Granville & Districts)
- Divisions 1-3 (Hills)
- Friday Division 1 (Nepean)
- Blacktown does not provide this competition

Overage-55's:

- Division 1 (Granville & Districts only)

Women:

- All Age Divisions 1–3, and Over 30's Divisions 1-2 (Blacktown & Districts)
- All Age Division 1 (Granville & Districts)
- All Age Divisions 2-3, and Over 30's Divisions 1-3 (Hills)
- Ruby League, then All Age Divisions 2-4, and Over 30's Division 1-2 (Nepean)

Below are lists of member clubs for each association.

=== Blacktown & Districts Soccer Football Association ===
The nine clubs in bold participate in the Premier League.

- Blacktown Premier Spurs FC
- **Blacktown Workers FC**
- Blacktown St Patricks
- **Doonside Hawks**
- **Eastern Creek Pioneer SC**
- Glenwood Redbacks
- Kings Langley
- Lourdes FC
- **Marayong FC**
- Marsden Park Galaxy FC
- Minchinbury Jets SC
- Mt Druitt Town Rangers FC
- Newbury Bulls
- Oakville United Ravens
- Parklea SC
- Plumpton-Oakhurst
- **Polonia FC**
- **Ponds FC**
- Prospect United
- **Quakers Hill**
- **Quakers Hill Tigers**
- **Riverstone-Schofields**
- Rooty Hill RSL (YTB)
- Ropes Crossing FC

=== Granville & Districts Soccer Football Association ===
The 10 clubs in bold compete in the X League in a 15-team competition.

- **Auburn District SC** (2 teams: Black and White)
- **Auburn FC** (2 teams: Black and White)
- **Dundas United**
- Ermington United
- Granville Kewpie Ariana
- Granville Rage
- **Granville Waratah**
- Greystanes
- **Guildford County**
- Guildford McCredie
- **Holroyd Rangers** (2 teams: Black and White)
- **Lidcombe Waratah** (2 teams: Black and White)
- Merrylands SFC
- Newington
- **Parramatta City**
- **Pendle Hill**
- Regents Park Saints
- **Rydalmere FC** (2 teams: Black and White)
- Toongabbie
- Wenty Waratah

=== Hills Soccer Football Association ===
The five clubs in bold compete in the Premier League First Grade.

- Baulkham Hills FC
- Bella Vista FC
- Box Hill Rangers FC
- **Castle Hill Rockets FC**
- **Castle Hill United FC**
- **Coptic United FC**
- Glenhaven FC
- Hills Grammar School
- Hills Knights FC
- Pumas FC
- Hills Spirit FC
- **Kellyville Kolts SC**
- Kellyville United FC
- Kenthurst FC
- North Kellyville FC
- North Rocks
- Norwest FC
- Rouse Hill Rams FC
- St Bernadette's FC
- **Winston Hills Bears FC**

=== Nepean Football Association ===
The nine clubs in bold compete in the Waratah League.

- Blaxland FC
- Bligh Park FC
- **Blue Mountains FC**
- **Colo SFC**
- Cranebrook United SC
- Emu Plains FC
- **Glenmore Park FC**
- Glossodia FC
- **Hazelbrook FC**
- Henry Lawson FC
- Jamisontown FC
- Joeys SC
- **Lowland Wanderers SC**
- Mulgoa Valley FC
- Nepean Dragons
- **Penrith FC**
- Penrith RSL SC
- **Penrith Rovers FC**
- Pitt Town Sports SC
- Richmond Ex-Servicemen's SC
- **Springwood United FC**
- St Clair United SC
- St Marys Band Club Rangers FC
- St Marys Convent SC
- St Marys SC
- Warradale FC
- Wentworth Falls FC
- **Werrington Croatia FC**
- Wilberforce United SC
- Wollemi FC

== Riverina Branch ==
=== Albury-Wodonga Football Association ===
The eleven clubs in bold compete in Division 1 competition.

- **Albury City SC**
- **Albury Hotspurs**
- **Albury United**
- Boomers FC
- **Cobram Roar**
- **Melrose FC**
- **Myrtleford Savoy SC**
- **St. Pats FC**
- **Twin City Wanderers**
- **Wangaratta City FC**
- **Wodonga Diamonds**
- **Wodonga Heart**

=== Griffith District Football Association ===
The four clubs in bold compete in First Grade in a five team competition.

- **Griffith City FC**
- Hanwood FC
- Leeton United FC
- **West Griffith SC**
- **Yenda FC**
- Yoogali FC
- **Yoogali SC** (2 teams)

=== South West Slopes ===
There are five teams affiliated with this division. There are no senior competitions in this division, only junior competitions.

- Cootamundra JSC
- Gundagai Panthers
- Harden SC
- Temora SC
- Tumut Eagles FC

=== Football Wagga Wagga ===
The ten clubs in bold compete in First Grade (Pascoe Cup).

- Charles Sturt FC
- Cootamundra SC
- **Griffith City FC**
- **Hanwood FC**
- **Henwood Park FC**
- Junee SC
- **Lake Albert SC**
- **Leeton United**
- **South Wagga Sports**
- Temora United SC
- **Tolland FC**
- Tumut Eagles FC
- **Wagga United**
- **Yoogali FC**
- **Young Lions**

== Southern Branch ==
Clubs in the different districts in 2016 are as follows:

=== Eurobodalla Football Association ===
The six teams in bold compete in Division 1 in a seven-team competitions.

- **Batemans Bay FC**
- **Bodalla SC**
- **Broulee FC** (2 teams: Mantarays and Stingrays)
- **Clyde United SC**
- **Moruya FC**
- **Narooma SC**

=== Shoalhaven District Football Association ===
The six teams in bold compete in the Bolden-Blackmore Shield Men's First Grade competition.

- Bomaderry FC
- Callala Brumbies FC
- Culburra Cougars FC
- **Huskisson Vincentia FC**
- **Illaroo FC**
- Manyana FC
- **Milton Ulladulla FC**
- **Shoalhaven Heads Berry FC**
- **Shoalhaven United FC**
- **St Georges Basin FC**
- Sussex Inlet FC

=== Highlands Soccer Association ===
The six teams in bold make up the current first grade All Age Men competition in an 8 team competition.

- **Bowral United FC**
- **Bundanoon Rebels FC**
- Exeter SC
- Highlands FC
- Hill Top Kookaburras SC
- **Mittagong United Lions** (2 teams)
- **Moss Vale Thistle SC** (2 teams)
- Oxley College Soccer
- **Robertson-Burrawang Rovers SC**
- Southern Highlands Christian School
- St Pauls
- Tudor House School
- **Yerrinbool-Bargo Bushrangers SC**

=== Southern Tablelands ===
The six clubs in bold compete in the twelve-team All Age Men's competition.

- **Crookwell SC** (Note: Crookwell fields two teams – Crookwell Red and Crookwell Griffins.)
- **Goulburn Stags FC** (Note: Goulburn Stags field three teams – Stags, Foxes, and 97.)
- **Goulburn Strikers**
- **Goulburn Workers FC**
- **Marulan FC** (Note: Marulan fields two teams – White and Green.)
- **MBK United SC** (Note: MBK United fields three teams – United, White and Pink.)
- Ss Peter & Paul FC
- Southern Tablelands United
- Wollondilly Soldiers SC

=== Far South Coast Football Association ===
The teams in bold compete in the First Grade Competition.

- **Bega Devils SC**
- Bemboka SC
- **Eden Killer Whales**
- Mallacooota SC
- **Merimbula SC**
- **Pambula United**
- **Tathra United**
- **Wolumla FC**

== Western Branch ==
There are five associations that form the Western Branch. They are the Bathurst District Football Association, Dubbo & District Football Association, Lachlan Amateur Soccer Association, Lithgow District Football Association, and Orange District Football Association. Each association is eligible to send representative team/(s) to the Western NSW Youth League.

The following six (6) teams competed in the 2025 Western Premier League:

- Bathurst '75 (BDF)
- Dubbo FC Bulls (DDFA)
- Macquarie United (DDFA)
- Orange Waratah (ODFA)
- Parkes Cobras (LASA)
- Panorama FC (BDF)

The teams in each district are as follows:

=== Bathurst District Football ===
The six teams in bold compete in the BDF Mens Premier League.

- **Abercrombie**
- **Bathurst '75**
- Bathurst City Red Tops
- **CSU Bathurst**
- Churches United
- Collegians
- **Eglinton DFC**
- Gulgong Lions FC
- Lithgow City Rangers
- **Lithgow Workmen's Club**
- Macquarie United
- Mudgee Gulgong Wolves
- Oberon United Wolves
- **Panorama FC**
- Scots All Saints College

=== Dubbo & District Football Association ===
The five teams compete in the six-team Division 1 competition.

- Coonamble
- Dubbo City Rangers
- **Dubbo FC Bulls** (Note: Bulls compete with two teams – Bulls White and Bulls Orange.)
- East Dubbo United
- **Macquarie United Dubbo**
- Narromine
- Newtown
- North West Falcons FC
- **Orana Spurs**
- RSL 78's
- RSL Youth
- SASS
- South Dubbo Wanderers
- Walgett
- **Wellington Warriors**
- **Westside Panthers**

=== Lachlan Amateur Soccer Association ===
There are 15 clubs affiliated with Lachlan Association. The five teams in bold compete in 1st Division in a six-team competition.

- Billabong SC
- Boorowra SC
- Condobolin Crusaders
- Cowra DSC
- **Forbes DSC**
- **Grenfell SC**
- **Lachlan Leopards**
- Parkes Cobras FC
- Parkes Railway Hotel Chooks
- Parkes Services SC
- **Railway Hotel Renegades**
- **Raptors SC**
- Star Jets
- Tichborne Tigers
- Young Lions SC

=== Lithgow Association ===
There are five affiliated clubs. There are no official senior competitions, only junior and social.

- Workies Redbacks FC
- Lithgow Thistles FC
- Wellarawang SC
- Blackheath Soccer FC
- Lithgow City Rangers

=== Orange & District Football Association ===
There are 14 affiliated clubs. The five teams in bold compete in Division A.

- **Barnstoneworth**
- Blayney (Juniors)
- Cowra Eagles
- Cudal
- **CYMS**
- Ex-Services
- Kinross Wolaroi
- Millthorpe
- Molong
- Nepalese FC Orange
- Orange Anglican Grammar
- **Orange Waratah**
- **Pinnacle FC**
- **The Saints**
