= Football NSW League One Women's =

- Organising body: Football NSW
- Founded: 24 August 2021; 5 years ago
- First season: 2022
- Country: Australia
- State: New South Wales
- Confederation: Asian Football Confederation
- Number of clubs: 14
- Promotion to: NPL NSW Women's
- Domestic cup: Sapphire Cup
- Current champions: South Coast Flame (2026)
- Current premiers: SD Raiders (2026)
- Website: footballnsw.com.au

The Football NSW League One Women's is a New South Wales soccer league which serves as the second-tier of women's soccer in New South Wales (with the exception of the northern regions). The competition is administered by Football NSW, the governing body of the sport in the southern region of the state (the northern region governed by Northern NSW Football). From the 2022 seasons onwards, the competition name was changed from "National Premier League 2 NSW Women's" to "Football NSW League One Women's".

== History ==
Following a review by the FFA of state league competitions in Australia, it was announced that they would nationalise the competitions under the one national banner, the National Premier Leagues from the 2013 seasons onwards. This saw the first and second-tier leagues of the state renamed under the banner.

The inaugural NSW NPL2 Women's premiers in 2013 were Western NSW Mariners, while the inaugural champions were UNSW FC.

== Format ==
The regular season consists of 26 rounds with each team playing each other twice-home and away. Following the regular season the top six teams on the table play in a finals series using the following format:

- First week – preliminary semi-final – 2nd vs 3rd + elimination semi-final – 4th vs 5th
- Second week – major semi-final – 1st vs winner PSF + minor semi-final – loser PSF vs winner ESF
- Third week – preliminary final – loser of MJF vs winner of MNS
- Final week – grand final – winner of MJF vs winner of PF

== Clubs ==
The following 14 clubs competed in the NSW League One Women during the 2026 season.

Club	Location	Grounds	Capacity	Founded	Notes
Bankstown City FC	Bankstown	Jensen Park	8,000	2013	
Blacktown Spartans FC	Rooty Hill	Blacktown Football Park	3,000	2002	
Camden Tigers	Camden	Ron Dine Memorial Reserve			
Central Coast Mariners Women's Academy	Lisarow	Pluim Park	2,000	2008	
Hills United FC	Hills District	Bella Vista Public School			
Inter Lions SC	Concord	Majors Bay Reserve			
Marconi Stallions FC	Fairfield	Marconi Stadium	9,000		
Mt Druitt Town Rangers	Mount Druitt	Popondetta Park	1,000		
Nepean FC	Penrith/St Marys	Cook Park	1,000		
SD Raiders	Moorebank	Ernie Smith Reserve	1,000	1998	
South Coast Flame FC	Wollongong	Sir Ian McLennan Oval			
St George FC	St George	Barton Park Sports Complex	5,000		
Sutherland Strikers	Sutherland	Harrie Dening Centre			
University of NSW	Kensington	The Village Green			
Source: Football NSW

== Honours ==
Club	Premierships	Years	Championships	Years	Total
Gladesville Ravens	1	2022	2	2019, 2022	3
Sydney Olympic	2	2017, 2018	1	2018	3
Central Coast Mariners Academy	1	2014	1	2014	2
Marconi Stallions	1	2015	1	2015	2
Bankstown City	0		1	2017	1
Northern Tigers	0		1	2016	1
UNSW FC	0		1	2013	1
APIA Leichhardt	1	2019	0		1
Inter Lions	1	2016	0		1
Western NSW Mariners	1	2013	0		1
