= Football NSW =

Soccer organisation in New South Wales

Football NSW Limited
- Formation: 1 April 2007; 19 years ago (1957; 69 years ago as New South Wales Federation of Soccer Clubs)
- Type: Sporting association in NSW
- Legal status: Active
- Headquarters: Valentine Sports Park
- Location: Sydney
- Region served: New South Wales, Australia
- Affiliations: Football Australia Limited
- Website: http://www.footballnsw.com.au

Football NSW Limited, formerly named Soccer NSW Limited and New South Wales Soccer Federation Ltd is a soccer football association in the Australian state of New South Wales. It operates competitions in NSW, (with the exception of northern regions where Northern NSW Football Limited operates), notably the National Premier Leagues NSW and Futsal Premier League. Football NSW is a member organisation of Football Australia Limited (FA).

== History ==
The first soccer association in New South Wales was the "South British Football Soccer Association", formed in 1882. It was succeeded in 1898 by the "New South Wales British Football Association" and eventually, in 1921, by the "Australian Soccer Football Association".

The first state competition in New South Wales was formed in 1928. By 1943, an association was formed to oversee the competition, called "New South Wales Soccer Football Association", which was incorporated as a company in 1945.

By 1957, many clubs in New South Wales were left disgruntled by the way soccer was organised by the NSW Soccer Football Association, due to numerous factors. Some migrant communities had created their own clubs when they were faced with closed doors by already established suburban clubs. After a meeting led by Hakoah president, Walter Sternberg in his Bellevue Hill home, a new association was formed, called the NSW Federation of Soccer Clubs. This federation displaced the former NSW Soccer Football Association.

The events of 1957 also led to a change in management nationally. With the Australian Soccer Football Association (ASFA) suspended by FIFA over player poaching disputes and the creation of Federations in other states, the Australian Soccer Federation (ASF) was created in 1961 to replace the old association. However, the ASF gained FIFA affiliation and recognition only after it paid ASFA's £5000 penalty bond to FIFA in 1963.

In 1995, "Soccer Australia Limited" replaced the "Australian Soccer Federation" and so the New South Wales federation was renamed "Soccer NSW Limited". In 2005, Soccer Australia Limited changed its name to "Football Federation Australia". and, on 1 April 2007, Soccer NSW changed its name to "Football NSW".

== Headquarters ==
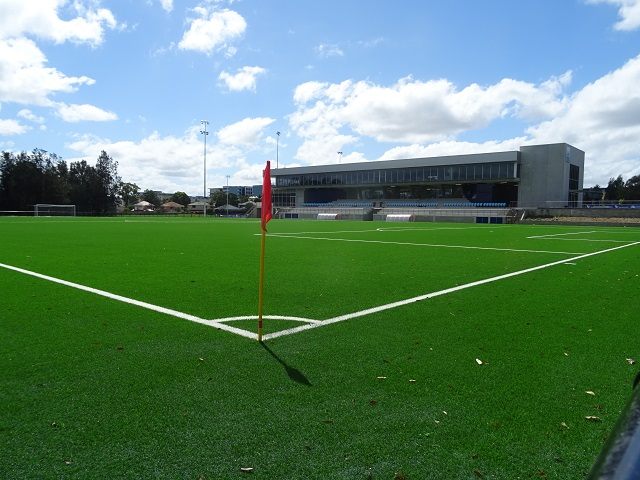
Valentine Sports Park

The headquarters of Football NSW are located at Valentine Sports Park, Glenwood. Valentine Sports Park is a multipurpose sporting complex which caters for various groups, as well as individuals. The complex consists of twin, triple and quad rooms accommodating up to 180 people, 5 playing fields, lecture rooms, indoor sports hall, 20 metre outdoor pool, sports medicine centre and a dining room open for breakfast, lunch and dinner. It also contains the offices of the Football NSW staff.

== Football ==
See Football (soccer) in New South Wales. Football NSW oversees numerous representative youth, men's and women's soccer competitions and cups, a number of which are non-amateur. It also oversees numerous club and amateur competitions run by the affiliated associations around the state.

=== Football NSW Institute ===
The Football NSW Institute (FNSWI) was established in 2013 as an elite development program for young footballers in New South Wales. It unified the Skilleroos, New South Wales Institute of Sport, and Skill Acquisition Programs into a single structure aligned with Football Federation Australia's Integrated Talented Player Pathway. Initially catering to both boys and girls, the program shifted its focus exclusively to girls' development from 2016, providing a high-performance environment for players aged U13 to U17. The FNSWI aimed to nurture talented footballers by offering top-tier coaching and training consistent with Football Australia Limited policies, with the goal of preparing players for professional careers and national representation. Following an extensive player development review during the 2024 season, Football NSW announced the cessation of the FNSWI program at the end of 2024. This decision marked a new direction for the organization's approach to youth and senior women's competitions, including the NPL NSW Women's and NSW League One Women's competitions. Throughout its operation, the FNSWI played a pivotal role in developing young female footballers and contributing to the growth of women's football in New South Wales.

== Futsal ==
Football NSW also operates two Futsal competitions, the "Futsal Premier League" (Known as the CARBIZ Futsal Premier League for sponsorship reasons) and the "Futsal Premier League 2" (Known as the CARBIZ FPL2). Originally there was only one representative competition with 16 teams. In the 2006/07 season the competition was split into 2 separate divisions of 8 teams each. In the 2007/08 season the top 8 clubs in the club championship (aggregate points of all teams) from that season were put in the First Division while the last 8 were put in the second division. In 2026, there are 8 premier league teams and 8 premier league 2 teams. The Current season format is a 14 week regular season with a 2 week finals series. It has usually started in mid-September and ended before Christmas with the first few rounds overlapping with the A Leagues and youth leagues finals.

== Football NSW competition clubs ==
Listed below are the men's all member clubs of Football NSW for the National Premier Leagues competitions and Football NSW League One and Two for 2026.

NPL NSW			NSW League One			NSW League Two		
Club	Founded	In current league since	Club	Founded	In current league since	Club	Founded	In current league since
APIA Leichhardt	1954	1993	Bankstown City Lions	1960	2023	Bankstown United	2016	2019
Blacktown City	1953	1990	Blacktown Spartans	2002	2017	Camden Tigers	1961	2023
University of NSW	1948	2026	Canterbury Bankstown	1886	2023	Central Coast United	2017	2024
Manly United	1992	2004	Central Coast Mariners Academy	2008	2026	Fraser Park FC	1961	2023
Marconi Stallions	1956	2018	Dulwich Hill	1968	2023	Gladesville Ryde Magic	1953	2010
SD Raiders	2012	2026	Hills United	1989	2025	Hawkesbury City	1975	2023
NWS Spirit	2004	2023	Hurstville ZFC	1970	2026	Bonnyrigg White Eagles	1968	2026
Rockdale Ilinden	1969	2010	Mounties Wanderers	1978	2025	Inner West Hawks	1978	2014
St George City	1924	2023	Hakoah Sydney City East	1939	2020	Dunbar Rovers	1991	2025
St George FC	1961	2024	Inter Lions	1983	2023	Parramatta FC	1956	2023
Sutherland Sharks	1930	2006	Macarthur Rams	1984	2023	Prospect United	1970	2023
Sydney FC Youth	2008	2017	Newcastle Jets Youth	2008	2025	South Coast Flame	2017	2023
Sydney Olympic	1957	2004	Bulls FC Academy	1952	2024	Sydney University	1946	2016
Sydney United 58	1957	2004	Northern Tigers	2002	2004	Granville Rage	1990	2023
Western Sydney Wanderers Youth	2012	2023	Rydalmere Lions	1979	2023	Nepean FC	2011	2025
Wollongong Wolves	1980	2004	Western City Rangers	1970	2026			

== Competition system ==
There are four men's competition levels in NSW, with promotion and relegation between the top 3 levels. It includes the Sydney Amateur League, which is not formally part of the competition system. In total, there are 259 clubs/teams across 28 divisions in New South Wales.

The women's soccer pyramid in New South Wales comprises 3 levels, with promotion and relegation between the top 2 levels.

=== Men's pyramid ===
==== State ====
Level		Leagues	
National	State	Leagues	
2	1	National Premier Leagues NSW; 16 clubs no promotion, ↓ relegate 1.5	
3	2	NSW League One; 16 clubs ↑ promote 1.5, ↓ relegate 1.5	
4	3	NSW League Two; 16 clubs ↑ promote 1.5, no relegation	
5	4	New South Wales Regional Leagues; 543 teams from 2 divisions no promotion	
5	4	Metropolitan Districts; 388 clubs from 6 districts	Regional Branches; 155 clubs from 3 Branches

==== Metropolitan ====
Level			Metropolitan Districts														
National	State	Metro	Metropolitan Districts														
5	4	1															
5	4	1	Far North; 54 clubs from 2 districts		North; 50 teams from 2 districts		East; 67 teams from 3 districts			West; 81 teams from 3 districts			South; 85 teams from 3 districts			Far South; 51 teams from 2 districts	
5	4	1	Central Coast Premier League; 10 teams no promotion, ↓ relegate 2	Northern Suburbs Premier League; 10 teams no promotion, ↓ relegate 1	Gladesville Hornsby Premier League; 10 teams no promotion, ↓ relegate 1	Manly Warringah Premier League; 11 teams no promotion, ↓ relegate 1	Bill Brackenbury Cup (Canterbury); 7 teams no promotion, ↓ relegate 1	Eastern Suburbs Premier League; 8 teams no promotion, ↓ relegate 1	St George Premier League; 10 teams no promotion, ↓ relegate 1	Blacktown Premier League; 10 teams no promotion, ↓ relegate 1	Granville X-League; 9 teams no promotion, ↓ relegate 1	Nepean Waratah League; 9 teams no promotion, ↓ relegate 1	Bankstown Premier League; 9 teams no promotion, ↓ relegate 1	Macarthur M-League; 8 teams no promotion, ↓ relegate 1	Southern Districts Premier League; 10 teams no promotion, ↓ relegate 1	Illawarra Premier League; 12 teams no promotion, ↓ relegate 1	Sutherland Premier League; 10 teams no promotion, ↓ relegate 1

==== Regional ====
Level			Regional Branches													
National	State	Reg	Regional Branches													
5	4	1														
5	4	1	Riverina; 31 clubs from 4 associations				Southern; 57 teams from 5 associations					Western; 65 clubs from 5 associations				
5	4	1	Albury-Wodonga Division One; 11 teams no promotion, no relegation	Griffith District First Grade; 5 teams no promotion, no relegation	South West Slopes; No senior competitions	Pascoe Cup (Wagga Wagga); 10 teams no promotion, no relegation	Eurobodalla Division 1; 6 teams no promotion, no relegation	Bolden-Blackmore Shield (Shoalhaven); 6 teams no promotion, no relegation	Highlands All-Age; 8 teams no promotion, no relegation	Southern Tablelands All-Age; 12 teams no promotion, no relegation	Far South Coast First Grade; 6 teams no promotion, no relegation	Western Premier League; 6 teams no promotion, no relegation				
6	5	2														
6	5	2										Bathurst District Premier League; 6 teams no promotion, no relegation	Dubbo & District Division 1; 6 teams no promotion, no relegation	Lachlan 1st Division; 6 teams no promotion, no relegation	Lithgow; No official senior competitions	Orange District Division A 5 teams no promotion, no relegation

=== Women's pyramid ===
==== State ====
Level		Leagues	
National	State	Leagues	
2	1	National Premier Leagues NSW Women's; 14 clubs no promotion, ↓ relegate 1	
3	2	NSW League One Women's; 14 clubs ↑ promote 1, no relegation	
4	3	New South Wales Regional Leagues no promotion	
4	3	Metropolitan Districts	Regional Branches

==== Metropolitan ====
Level			Metropolitan Districts														
National	State	Metro	Metropolitan Districts														
4	3	1															
4	3	1	Far North; 2 districts		North; 2 districts		East; 3 districts			West; 3 districts			South; 3 districts			Far South; 2 districts	
4	3	1	Central Coast Premier League	Northern Suburbs Division One	Gladesville Hornsby Premier League	Manly Warringah Premier League	Grace Martin Trophy (Canterbury)	Eastern Suburbs Championship	St George Premier Women's League	Blacktown All-Age One	Granville Ladies Premier League	Nepean All-Age One	Bankstown All-Age One	Macarthur All-Age One	Southern Districts All-Age One	South Coast All-Age One	Sutherland All-Age A

== Associations and Branches ==
As one of two organising bodies for soccer in New South Wales, Football NSW operates within the southern part of the state. At a local level, Football NSW works with 15 regional-based constituent association members which operate within their respected region. Three regional Football NSW branches exist.

Metro Associations (Representative teams)

- Bankstown District Amateur Football Association (Bankstown United)
- Blacktown & District Soccer Football Association (Blacktown Spartans)
- Canterbury District Soccer Football Association
- Central Coast Football (Central Coast United)
- Eastern Suburbs Football Association
- Football South Coast (South Coast Flame FC)
- Granville & District Soccer Football Association (Parramatta FC)
- Hills Football (Hills United FC)
- Macarthur District Soccer Football Association (Macarthur Rams)
- Manly Warringah Football Association (Manly United)
- Nepean Football Association (Nepean FC)
- North West Sydney Football Ltd. (NWS Spirit)
- Northern Suburbs Football Association (Northern Tigers)
- Southern Districts Soccer Football Association (SD Raiders)
- St George Football Association (St George City FC)
- Sutherland Shire Football Association
- Sydney Amateur Football League

Regional Associations

- Albury Wodonga Football Association
- Bathurst District Football Association
- Dubbo District Football Association
- Eurobodalla Football Association
- Far South Coast Football Association
- Football Wagga Wagga
- Griffith & District Football Association
- Highlands Soccer Association
- Lachlan Amateur Soccer Association Inc.
- Lithgow District Football Association
- Orange District Football Association
- Shoalhaven District Football Association
- South West Slopes Football Association
- Southern Tablelands Football Association
- Western Plains Amateur Soccer Association

Branches

- Southern NSW Football
- Football Riverina
- Western NSW Football

== Past League Premiers Winners ==
The sections below list previous league winners. League winners are listed as first place in the standings at the end of the regular section, not winners of the finals series (when held).

=== 1957–1958 ===
The first season of the newly formed Soccer NSW began with two divisions. Canterbury-Marrickville were the inaugural premiers of Division One.

Season	Division One	Division Two
1957	Canterbury-Marrickville	Villawood
1958	Corrimal United	Budapest (East), Pan-Hellenic (West)

=== 1959–1962 ===
After two seasons, a third division was added.

Season	Division One	Division Two	Division Three
1959	Sydney Prague	Neerlandia	Toongabbie
1960	Sydney Prague	Pan-Hellenic	Sydney Croatia
1961	Sydney Prague	SSC Yugal	Melita Eagles
1962	Budapest	Croatia Sydney	Cabramatta

=== 1963–1970 ===
Division Three disbanded to form lower grade Amateur Leagues.

Season	Division One	Division Two
1963	Prague	Corinthian BESC
1964	A.P.I.A. Leichhardt	Polonia-North Side
1965	South Coast United	Corinthian BESC
1966	A.P.I.A. Leichhardt	Polonia-North Side
1967	A.P.I.A. Leichhardt	Manly Warringah
1968	Hakoah Eastern Suburbs	Auburn
1969	South Coast United	Marconi Fairfield
1970	Hakoah Eastern Suburbs	Western Suburbs

=== 1971–1976 ===
Amateur Leagues/Inter suburban leagues reformed to create another Division Three.

Season	Division One	Division Two	Division Three
1971	Hakoah Eastern Suburbs	Sutherland Shire	Bankstown City FC
1972	St George-Budapest	Granville Parramatta	Rosebery Rhodes
1973	Hakoah Eastern Suburbs	Canterbury-Marrickville	Riverside Rapid
1974	Hakoah Eastern Suburbs	Granville Parramatta	Northern Districts
1975	A.P.I.A. Leichhardt	Manly Warringah	Toongabbie
1976	St George-Budapest	Riverside Avala	Ku-Ring-Gai

=== 1977–1978 ===
Another division was then added in 1977, creating four divisions.

Season	Division One	Division Two	Division Three	Division Four
1977	Croatia Sydney	Melita Eagles	Blacktown United	Lane Cove United
1978	Croatia Sydney	Ku-Ring-Gai	Nepean Corinthian	Baulkham Hills

=== 1979–1982 ===
The top four divisions were renamed for a few seasons.

Season	State League	Division One	Division Two	Division Three
1979	Croatia Sydney	St George-Budapest	Bathurst '75	North Bankstown
1980	Melita Eagles	Marconi Fairfield	Guildford County	Liverpool Albion
1981	Croatia Sydney	SSC Yugal	Dee Why Swans	Kingsford Hellenic
1982	Croatia Sydney	Ku-Ring-Gai	Artarmon	Bondi Marine

=== 1983–1988 ===
State League reverted to Division One naming, while Division Three disbanded back to lower Inter Urban leagues, leaving three premier divisions.

Season	Division One	Division Two	Division Three
1983	Melita Eagles	Rockdale Ilinden	Bathurst '75
1984	Inter Monaro	Fairy Meadow SC	Campbelltown City
1985	Canterbury-Marrickville	Wollongong Macedonia	Kingsford Hellenic
1986	Melita Eagles	SSC Yugal	Granville Chile
1987	Wollongong City	Polonia	Granville Chile
1988	Blacktown City	Avala	Dulwich Hill

=== 1989–1991 ===
Division Four was re-introduced.

Season	Division One	Division Two	Division Three	Division Four
1989	Melita Eagles	Sydney Macedonia	Roseberry Portugal	Petersham Luisitanos
1990	Wollongong Macedonia	Southern Districts FA	Port Hacking-Greenisland	Arncliffe
1991	Sutherland Sharks	Waverley FC	Lemnos Allstars	Western District

=== 1992–2000 ===
Again the premier division was renamed, this time to the "Super League". Lower divisions were renamed accordingly from Division One.

Season	Super League	Division 1	Division 2	Division 3
1992	Avala	Cyprus United	Belmore Hercules	Spanish Club
1993	Blacktown City FC	Mt Druitt Town Rangers	North Ryde	St Johns Parks
1994	Bankstown City FC	Macarthur Rams	Southern Minotaurs	University of NSW
1995	Manly Warringah Dolphins	Belmore Hercules	Penrith Panthers FC	Greystanes
1996	Adamstown Rosebud (Stage 1), Parramatta Eagles (Stage 2)	Sydney Cosmos	Greystanes	Gladesville United
1997	Parramatta Eagles	Hurstville City Minotaurs	AC United	Glebe Wanderers
1998	Bonnyrigg White Eagles	Fairfield Bulls	Hadjuk Wanderers	Sydney University
1999	Bonnyrigg White Eagles	Manly Warringah Dolphins	Fraser Park Dragons	White City
2000	Blacktown City FC	Fairfield Bulls	Greystanes	Prairiewood United

=== 2000–2012 ===
2000 saw another shake-up of the league structures. Soccer NSW introduced a new "Premier League" that was to be run over summer and be aligned with the National Soccer League (NSL). The Super League would continue to run in the usual way, rebranded as the "Winter Super League". Divisions Two and Three were renamed States League 1 and 2 respectively, and were also conducted over the winter of 2001. During the demise of the NSL and rise of the A-League, the Premier League reverted to playing over winter for the 2006 season. This meant there was approximately nine months break between competitions.

Season	Premier League	Winter Super League	State League 1	State League 2
2000–01	Blacktown City FC	Bankstown City FC	Sydney University	Western Sydney Lions
2001–02	Parramatta FC	Rockdale City Suns	Wanderers Cedars	FC Bossy Liverpool
2002–03	Blacktown City FC	Sydney Crescent Star	Northern Tigers	Camden Tigers
2003–04	Belconnen Blue Devils	Manly Warringah Dolphins	Nepean Association	Inter Lions
2004–05	Bankstown City FC	FC Bossy Liverpool	Fairfield City Lions	Springwood SSC
2006	Blacktown City FC	Rockdale City Suns	Mt Druitt Town Rangers	University of NSW
2007	Blacktown City FC	Northern Tigers	Bankstown Berries	Greenisland (North), Hurstville City Minotaurs (South)
2008	Sutherland Sharks	Bonnyrigg White Eagles	Spirit FC	Balmain Tigers (North), Camden Tigers (South)
2009	Sydney United	Rockdale City Suns	Dulwich Hill FC	Camden Tigers
2010	Bonnyrigg White Eagles	Parramatta FC	Hills Brumbies	Fairfield Bulls
2011	Sydney Olympic	Blacktown Spartans	Mounties Wanderers	Northbridge FC
2012	Bonnyrigg White Eagles	Northern Tigers	Gladesville Ryde Magic	Hakoah Sydney City East FC

=== 2013–2015 ===
Another overhaul of the league structure occurred with the introduction of the nationwide National Premier Leagues. State Federations were required to name their premier leagues as such. For Football NSW, the meant the "Premier League" was to be called "National Premier Leagues NSW" instead. The "Super League" also had to follow suit, becoming the "National Premier Leagues NSW 2". State Leagues remained the same.

Season	NPL NSW	NPL NSW 2	State League 1	State League 2
2013	Sydney United	St George Saints	Balmain Tigers FC	Stanmore Hawks
2014	Bonnyrigg White Eagles	Parramatta FC	Hakoah Sydney City East	Hurstville FC
2015	Blacktown City FC	Spirit FC	North Shore Mariners	Dunbar Rovers

=== 2016–2019 ===
Another minor change occurred for the 2016 season, with State League 1 adopting the "NPL NSW 3 moniker", thus State League 2 was reverted to simply State League.

Season	NPL NSW	NPL NSW 2	NPL NSW 3	State League
2016	Sydney United	Sydney FC Youth	Hills Brumbies	St George FA
2017	APIA Leichhardt Tigers	Marconi Stallions	Rydalmere Lions	Bankstown United
2018	Sydney Olympic	Mt Druitt Town Rangers	St George FA	Central Coast United
2019	APIA Leichhardt Tigers	Hills United	SD Raiders	Fraser Park

=== 2020–2021 ===
After a further review, there was another restructure which came into effect in the 2020 season, with the branding of an NPL4 competition.

Season	NPL NSW	NPL NSW 2	NPL NSW 3	NPL NSW 4
2020	Rockdale City Suns	Central Coast Mariners Academy	Rydalmere Lions	Fraser Park
2021	Cancelled due to the COVID-19 pandemic in Australia.			

=== 2022 ===
The 2022 season saw more changes as the NPL 2, NPL 3 and NPL 4 competitions were renamed to League One, League Two and League Three respectively.

Season	NPL NSW	NSW League One	NSW League Two	NSW League Three
2022	Sydney Olympic	Central Coast Mariners Academy	Inter Lions	Newcastle Jets Youth

=== 2023–present ===
The 2023 season saw another change as the NSW League Three competition was disbanded in favour of three larger leagues.

Season	NPL NSW	NSW League One	NSW League Two
2023	APIA Leichhardt	Hills United	UNSW
2024	Rockdale Ilinden	Mt Druitt Town Rangers	Newcastle Jets Youth
2025	APIA Leichhardt (C)	UNSW (P)	Hurstville Zagreb (P)
