= Soccer in New South Wales =

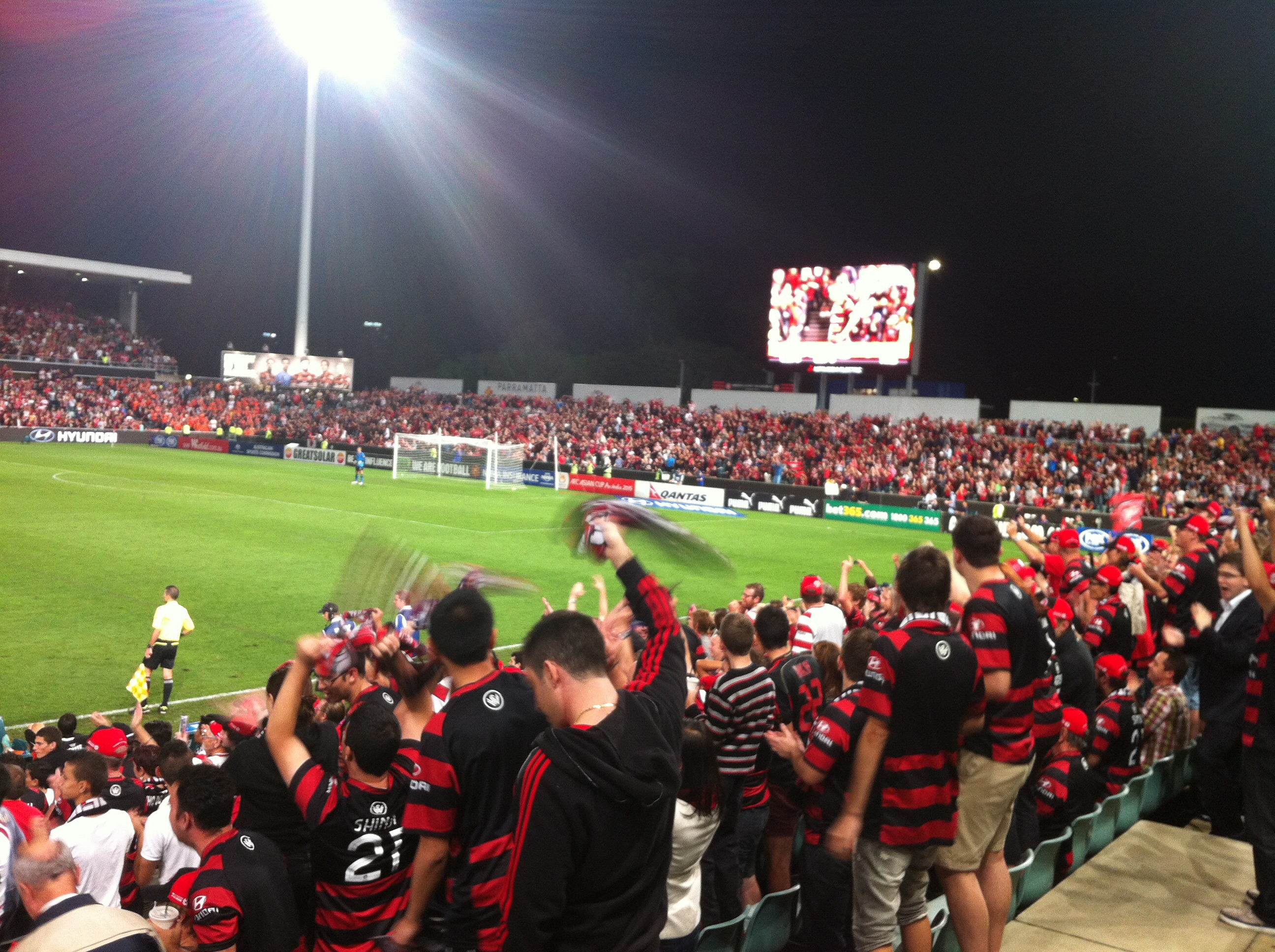
- Fans at a Western Sydney Wanderers game
- Country: New South Wales
- Governing body: Football NSW; Northern New South Wales Football
- Representative teams: New South Wales Metropolitan, New South Wales Country, Northern New South Wales
- Nicknames: Soccer, football
- First played: 1880, Parramatta
- Registered players: 471,480

National competitions
- A-League

Club competitions
- National Premier Leagues NSW (NSW Metropolitan & NSW Country); National Premier Leagues Northern NSW (Northern NSW)

Soccer in New South Wales is a popular participation and spectator sport. It is organised and managed on a state level by two separate governing bodies; Football NSW and Northern New South Wales Football which are affiliated at a national level to Football Federation Australia.

New South Wales and the state historically has had a large influence on soccer in Australia. It has the most registered soccer players in the country, with over 471,480 and the most teams in the professional A-League competition. The state's first soccer club was Wanderers FC founded in Sydney in 1880.

New South Wales has the highest participation of any football playing state in the country, with a total of 7% of the population regularly playing or watching the sport.

== Participation ==
Registered players
2019	2023/24
457,285	471,480

== National Representation ==
=== Current top level teams ===
Five of the twelve teams in the A-League are based in New South Wales: Western Sydney Wanderers, Sydney FC, Macarthur FC, Newcastle Jets and Central Coast Mariners.

NSW is represented in the national women's W-League by Newcastle Jets, Sydney FC and Western Sydney Wanderers associated women's teams. Central Coast Mariners also had a team in the W-League between 2008–2010.

New South Wales sends teams to the annual national youth competitions in the form of New South Wales Metropolitan and New South Wales Country (run by Football NSW) and Northern New South Wales (run by Northern NSW Football).

=== Defunct National Soccer League ===
New South Wales had many different teams in the NSL over the years. NSW usually had at least the first or second most clubs in the league and also got many premierships over the years. There is a list below of clubs from NSW that participated in the NSL and are still running today in NSW competitions.

- A.P.I.A. Leichhardt Tigers
- Blacktown City Demons
- Canterbury-Marrickville
- Marconi Stallions
- Newcastle Rosebud United
- Parramatta Eagles
- St George Saints
- Sydney Olympic
- Sydney United
- Wollongong Wolves

== Football NSW Competitions ==
In the main the Youth and Senior competitions are divided into two sections: Club or Amateur Soccer which is run by each association, and Representative or Semi-Pro soccer which is run by Football NSW.

In 2008 there was a major restructuring of the New South Wales Men's, Women's and Youth competitions. The youth teams were restructured to be aligned with their Senior Clubs. The Men's Senior competitions was restructured to add new teams to the NSW Premier League and a new promotion/relegation system was introduced.

In 2019 this system was again restructured, this time separating the Youth and Senior clubs from each other. This allowed Senior results to only affect the Senior portion of a club, and not the youth portion (e.g. if a first grade team was relegated to NPL 2, their youth would remain in their current league and not be relegated as well).

=== Youth/Senior - Amateur ===
These are the branches and associations that make up all of Football NSW's youth and senior, women and men Amateur competitions around the state. Each of the associations run their own competitions for various age groups.

16 of the associations also have teams in the Metropolitan League (11s & 12s boys). Some also act as feeder associations or give their backing to certain semi-pro or Representative clubs.

=== Associations ===
- Bankstown District Amateur Football Association
- Blacktown & District Soccer Football Association Inc.
- Canterbury District Soccer Football Association
- Central Coast Football
- Eastern Suburbs Football Association
- Gladesville-Hornsby Football Association
- Granville & Districts Soccer Football Association
- Hills Football Association
- Northern Suburbs Football Association (formerly Ku-Ring-Gai & District Soccer Association)
- Macarthur Districts Soccer Football Association
- Manly Warringah Football Association
- Nepean Football Association
- North West Sydney Women's Football
- Football South Coast
- Southern Districts Soccer Football Association
- St George Football Association Inc
- Sutherland Shire Junior SFA Inc.
- Sydney Amateur Football League Inc.

=== Branches ===
==== Football Riverina ====
- Albury Wodonga Football Association
- Wagga Wagga Football Association
- Griffith & District Amateur Football Association
- South West Slopes Football Association

==== Southern NSW Soccer ====
Controlling Body - Football NSW Southern Branch

- Eurobodalla Football Association
- Far South Coast Football Association
- Highlands Soccer Association Inc.
- Shoalhaven District Football Association Inc.
- Southern Tablelands Football Association

==== Western NSW Football ====
- Bathurst District Football Association
- Dubbo & District Football Association
- Lachlan Amateur Soccer Association
- Lithgow District Football Association
- Orange Football Association
- Western Plains Soccer Association

=== Youth - Representative ===
The Youth Men's Representative system which is run by Football NSW caters for the ages between 11 and 18. It is divided into 4 main leagues.

The representative Youth leagues are seen as the best soccer a youth player can get in New South Wales. The Association Youth League is the fourth-strongest in the state, with the National Premier Leagues Youth 1 the strongest league of youth football in NSW, as well as the most prestigious.

For the Association Youth League (AYL), there is no relegation or promotion. There is a relegation/promotion system between the NSW National Premier Leagues Youth 1, 2 and 3 which branches off the competition structure:

Before the beginning of each National Premier Leagues Youth season, Football NSW creates a Blue and White group in NPL Youth 1, and NPL Youth 2 (each group composed of 12 teams) for the first half of the competition. These groups are made based on each clubs’ success across the Under 14s to Under 18s age groups in the previous season.

For the first half of the season, each club plays against every club in their respective group once (11 rounds). Whilst the rounds progress, each of the points that each age group earn are added to a Club Championship table. Although each age group has their own ladder for the first half of the competition, the Club Championship table ultimately determines the second half of the season for each club.

At the end of the first 11 rounds (the completion of the first half of the season), each age group’s final point tally is added with their other age groups in the club to make an overall point total for the club (this is the club championship). The top six teams from each group in National Premier Leagues Youth 1 based on the Club Championship combine to produce a National Premier Leagues 1.1, and the bottom six combine from each group to produce a National Premier Leagues 1.2. The same applies for National Premier League 2 to produce a 2.1 group and 2.2.

In the second half of the season, the 1.1, 1.2, 2.1, and 2.2 teams again play against each other club in their group once (a further 11 rounds where they again verse 5 clubs from their original groups and a new 6 from the other group).

At the end of the 11 rounds (22 overall), the top 5 teams in each age group’s ladder in the 1.1 and 2.1 tiers play a finals series to determine the champion for National Premier Leagues Youth 1 and 2 in their age group. Meanwhile, a new Club Championship for the second half of the season determines which clubs get relegated and promoted from 1.2 and 2.1. The top 3 clubs from NPL Youth 2.1 in terms of club championship are promoted to National Premier Leagues Youth 1 for the next season, and the bottom 3 teams in terms of club championship in NPL Youth 1.2 are relegated to National Premier Leagues Youth 2 for the next season.

== Football NSW Senior Leagues ==
These are the Senior Men's and Women's competitions. Many of the Senior Men's competitions below are semi-professional.

=== Senior Men's ===
All Senior Men's teams are linked with their counterparts of Under 20s, Under 18s and all Open Age competitors.

Top New South Wales competitions:

- National Premier Leagues NSW (16 Teams)
  Premier League
- NSW League One (16 Teams)
  Super League
- NSW League Two (15 Teams)
  Division One

=== Senior Women's ===
Both Women's leagues comprise 1st Grade, Reserve Grade, U17, U15 and U14. Football NSW Senior Women's Competitions (in descending order in terms of significance)

- National Premier Leagues NSW Women’s (12 Teams)
- NSW League One Women's (12 Teams)

== Northern NSW Leagues Competitions ==
=== Senior Men's ===
All Senior Men's teams are linked with their counterparts of Under 20s, Under 18s and all Open Age competitors.

Top Northern New South Wales competitions:

- National Premier Leagues Northern NSW (12 Teams)
- Northern League One (10 Teams)
- Zone League One (12 Teams)

=== North Coast Football ===
North Coast Football is a league extending from Iluka to Macksville with over 5000 registered players. It contains the two largest clubs on the north coast of NSW, Woolgoolga F.C. and Northern Storm F.C. (each with over 400 registered players).

=== Northern Inland Football ===
Northern Inland Football is a soccer association based in the Northern Inland region of New South Wales extending from Quirindi in the South to Tenterfield in the North

=== Other Leagues ===
Other leagues which are supervised by Northern New South Wales Football include Hunter Valley Football, Macquarie Football, Newcastle Football, Football Mid North Coast and Football Far North Coast.

== Other state affiliations ==
A number of clubs in southern New South Wales are affiliated with Football Victoria, including Deniliquin Wanderers and Echuca Moama Border Raiders, both of whom are currently playing in the Bendigo Amateur Soccer League. Clubs in Yass, Queanbeyan and Cooma are affiliated with Capital Football, while those in Murwillumbah and Tweed Heads play in Football Queensland competitions. Football in Broken Hill is under the auspices of Football South Australia.

== Cup Competitions ==
Following is an incomplete list of Cup competitions in New South Wales.

=== The Waratah Cup ===
The Waratah Cup is a statewide knockout competition open to men's teams from the NSW Premier, Super, Division 1 and Conference Leagues as well as local Association men's teams. Since 2014 preliminary rounds have been used to determine the NSW entrants to the national FFA Cup knockout competition.

=== Johnny Warren Cup ===
The Johnny Warren Cup is the pre-season tournament for the NSW Premier League. The teams are divided into two pools with the winner of each pool contesting the final

=== The State Robertson & Cullinan Cups ===
The SRC Cups competition is open to Association club teams. The following age categories have cup competitions:

- Male 12-14-16-18-21-All Age & O35
- Female 12-14-16-18 & All Age.

Baulkham Hills Kookaburra's are defending champions after taking the title in a close affair in 2007. An extra time winner sealing the victory. Although Baulkham Hills were lucky to finish the match with 11 men after their right back was lucky to escape a second yellow.

=== Harry Williams Cup ===
Named after Harry Williams, the former Socceroo and only indigenous man to represent Australia at the World Cup, The Harry Williams Cup aims to unearth Australia’s next crop of indigenous soccer stars with a four-day tournament open to Boys in the Under 12, 14 and 16 age categories. The Indigenous teams play against school and association based club sides with all indigenous sides accommodated during the tournament on-site.

=== Frank Broughton Cup ===
The Frank Broughton Cup is open to Grade 11 Association Representative teams and Invitees

=== Centenary Cup ===
The Centenary Cup is open to Grade 12 Association Representative teams and Invitees

=== Champion of Champions ===
The Champion of Champions tournament is an annual tournament run throughout late September and October. The champion side from each association's division 1 in each age group is entered in a cup competition to determine an overall amateur champion for the year within the state.

== NSWIS ==
The NSW Institute of Sport (NSWIS), located at Sydney Olympic Park, operates men's and women's soccer programs. The men's program is aimed at identifying and nurturing talented 15- and 16-year-olds across the state, while the women's program is an individual skills based program for identified U20 and Senior athletes.

== See also ==
- History of soccer in Newcastle, New South Wales
