= Buddy Farah =

Footballer (born 1978)

Personal information
- Full name: Badawi Farah
- Date of birth: 18 August 1978 (age 48)
- Place of birth: Sydney, New South Wales, Australia
- Height: 1.84 m (6 ft 0 in)
- Position: Midfielder

Youth career
- Marconi Stallions

Senior career*
Years	Team	Apps	(Gls)
1997–2001	Marconi Stallions	74	(2)
2001–2003	Wollongong Wolves	31	(0)
2003	Nepean Association	7	(2)
2003–2004	Nejmeh		
2004	Marconi Stallions	0	(0)
2005	Bankstown City Lions		
2005–2006	Selangor FA		
2006	Keflavík	4	(0)
2007–2008	APIA Leichhardt Tigers		

International career
1997–2000	Australia U23	10	(0)
2001–2003	Lebanon	14	(1)
- * Club domestic league appearances and goals

Badawi "Buddy" Farah (Arabic: بدوي "بدي" فرح; born 18 August 1978) is a football agent and former professional player. Born in Australia, he played for the Lebanon national team.

After beginning his career with Marconi Stallions in the Australian National Soccer League, Farah went on to play for Nejmeh in the Lebanese Premier League and Keflavík in the Iceland Úrvalsdeild, before retiring in 2008. He played for the Australia national under-23 team prior to the 2000 Sydney Olympics, and the Lebanon national team from 2001 to 2003.

== Club career ==
=== Early career ===
Born in Australia, Farah is of Lebanese descent. He played youth football for National Soccer League (NSL) club Marconi Stallions, where he joined the club's first-team in 1997. In 2001, he was transferred to fellow NSL side Wollongong Wolves, where he would stay until 2003. At the end of the 2002–03 season, Wollongong had offered to renew Farah's contract; however, it was declined due to the low wage which was worth one-third of his previous contract. Farah played for Nepean Association in the 2003 NSW State League Division 1, scoring two goals in seven appearances.

=== Nejmeh ===
On 28 August 2003, Farah signed a two-year contract with Lebanese Premier League club Nejmeh; the contract was worth at least six times what he would have been receiving if he had stayed at Wollongong, an estimated $220,000 (€170,000). Farah established himself in the club's first-team while playing for Lebanon. Saudi Arabia's Al-Hilal offered a fee of $1 million (€770,000) to purchase him from Nejmeh, but the club president, Rafic Hariri, who at the time was Lebanon's Prime Minister, declined the offer.

While at the club, Nejmeh reached the quarter-finals of the 2004 AFC Cup and played in the qualifying rounds of the 2004 AFC Champions League.

In 2004 Farah sued Nejmeh over a pay dispute and alleged breach of contract. The club neglected Farah while he suffered a serious liver infection, which evolved into a near-death experience. Farah had been sent to hospital in early 2004, having been diagnosed with Hepatitis A after eating contaminated seafood. He was treated in enough time to escape liver surgery. He then left Beirut for further treatment in Sydney, on the condition he would return to Nejmeh after an agreed six-week period. During that time, Farah claimed that Nejmeh did not honour its financial commitments, as Farah refused to return to Lebanon due to the financial issue. Farah then pressed legal charges to Nejmeh's board of directions where his legal team were arguing that Farah had been robbed of income from representing Lebanon; the case's resolution was in the hands of a court in Lebanon.

=== Return to Australia ===
After returning from Lebanon to Australia in 2004, where he joined Marconi Stallions, he was ineligible to play for six months due to a dis-clearance from FIFA. Farah joined Bankstown City Lions before transferring to Malaysian side Selangor FA. He then signed a two-year contract with Iceland's Keflavík ÍF, where the club had finished fourth in the Úrvalsdeild. Farah joined APIA Leichhardt Tigers for the 2007 NSW Premier League season before retiring in 2008.

== International career ==
=== Australia U23 ===
Under coach Raul Blanco, Farah featured in 10 games for the Australia under-23 squad prior to the 2000 Sydney Olympics. Blanco selected his squad for the tournament leaving out Farah.

=== Lebanon ===
In 2000, Farah took up the opportunity to represent Lebanon, becoming the second Australian born player to do so after Michael Reda in 2000, where he would take part in the qualifying campaign for the 2002 FIFA World Cup and the 2002 Arab Nations Cup. Farah's moment of glory came on 4 September 2003, when he scored in the 56th minute of a 1–0 victory against North Korea in Pyongyang during a 2004 AFC Asian Cup qualification match.

"I was always passionate about playing for Australia, but when the time came he [Blanco] always picked someone else," "It was a bit disappointing, but I guess it wasn't to be. Now I'm playing for Lebanon, I basically get picked for every game, and I'm playing for a club side which gets 40,000 to 50,000 people every game. It's been an incredible ride, I haven't had time to scratch myself. It was huge, scoring my first international goal," What made it even better was the way we had been treated before the game. They [North Korea] put us in a dump of a hotel, we had to cook our own food for a week, and our training field had goats and sheep on it. The experience bonded us together, and when we went out and beat them, well, let's just say we enjoyed it." – Farah on playing for Lebanon

He took part in the qualifying campaign for the 2006 FIFA World Cup before retiring from international football in 2004. In January 2006, Lebanon and Australia were both drawn in the same group for the 2007 AFC Asian Cup qualifiers. Within hours from the draw's finalisation, Farah had contacted the Lebanese FA and was told that he would be "welcomed back with open arms".

== Personal life ==
Farah is Christian. Since 2009, Farah is managing director of Benchmark Sports Management, and acts as an advisor for a number of Australian and international professional footballers and clubs.

== Career statistics ==
=== International ===
Appearances and goals by national team and year
National team	Year	Apps	Goals
Lebanon	2001	7	0
Lebanon	2002	2	0
Lebanon	2003	5	1
Total		14	1

Scores and results list Lebanon's goal tally first, score column indicates score after each Farah goal.

List of international goals scored by Buddy Farah
No.	Date	Venue	Opponent	Score	Result	Competition
1	4 September 2003	Kim Il Sung Stadium, Pyongyang, North Korea	North Korea	1–0	1–0	2004 AFC Asian Cup qualification

== See also ==
- List of Lebanon international footballers born outside Lebanon
- List of sportspeople who competed for more than one nation
