= Tracey Wheeler =

Australian soccer player

Personal information
- Full name: Tracey Lee Wheeler
- Date of birth: 26 September 1967 (age 59)
- Place of birth: Sydney, New South Wales, Australia
- Height: 1.80 m (5 ft 11 in)
- Positions: Goalkeeper; defender

Youth career
- Wentworthville Uniting Church

Senior career*
Years	Team	Apps	(Gls)
1981–1985	Wenty Waratahs		
1986	Chipping Norton		
1987–1988	Blacktown		
1989–1990	Melita Eagles		
1991–1992	Morley-Windmills SC		
1993–1994	Forrestfield United SC		
1995–1996	Fremantle United		
1996–1999	SASI Pirates		
1999–2002	Murdoch University		

International career
1989–2000	Australia	49	(0)
- * Club domestic league appearances and goals

Tracey Lee Wheeler (born 26 September 1967) is an Australian former soccer goalkeeper who played for the Australia women's national soccer team from 1989 to the 2000 Summer Olympics. During that time she competed in four OFC Women's Championships in 1989, 1991, 1994, 1998 (winning the latter two) and two FIFA Women's World Cups (1995, 1999). Wheeler played for various club teams, mostly based in Sydney and then Perth. She retired from soccer in 2002. In 2008, she was inducted into the Football Federation of Australia's Hall of Fame. Since 1997, she has also worked as a physiotherapist.

== Early years and personal life ==
Tracey Lee Wheeler was born on 26 September 1967 in Sydney. She first played soccer as an 8 year-old, in a boys' team. After secondary education Wheeler completed a Bachelor in Applied Science (Physiotherapy) degree at University of Sydney. She moved to Perth in 1991. Her playing career was disrupted in both 1993 and 1996 by anterior cruciate ligament (ACL) injuries to the same knee. Each took 10 months of rehabilitation to recover. As a member of the national team, she had access to Australian Institute of Sport's (AIS) medical and physiotherapy staff. Wheeler completed a post-graduate Diploma in Sports Physiotherapy at Curtin University in 1997, thereby establishing her physiotherapy practice. In April 1997, she married Peter.

== Playing career ==
=== State and club teams ===
Wheeler was a soccer player for various New South Wales regional leagues teams. She started with Granville and Districts' team, Wentworthville Uniting Church as a junior. At 13 she joined another Granville districts side, Wenty Waratahs seniors (1981–1985), which was followed by Southern Districts teams: Chipping Norton (1986, as a defender/midfielder), Blacktown (1987–1988, first played as goalkeeper) and Melita Eagles (1989–1990). She was goalkeeper for the New South Wales state team in their 1-0 win over South Queensland for the national title in 1988.

After 1991, Wheeler spent most of her club career in Western Australian teams. Her club teams include stints with Morley-Windmills SC for 1991–1992, Forrestfield United SC (1993–1995) and then Fremantle United (1995–1996). The player joined the Western Australia State Senior team in 1991–1992 and 1995–1996.. As there were no AIS-aligned teams in Perth, she switched to SASI Pirates in South Australia from 1997 to 2000. The latter team won the Women's National Soccer League championship for 1998–99. Her next team was Murdoch University (1998–2002), where a third knee injury resulted in her retirement from soccer.

=== International career ===
Wheeler played for the Australia women's national soccer team (initially dubbed "Female Socceroos", later the "Matildas") from 1989 to 2000 for a total of 49 caps. She first played for the Female Socceroos in the 1989 OFC Women's Championship match against New Zealand, held in Brisbane on 26 March; New Zealand won 0–3. Subsequently Australia finished third overall. Their coach Steve Darby named Wheeler for the squad for the 1991 OFC Women's Championship held in May in Sydney. Australian had equal points with New Zealand, however due to an inferior goal difference the Female Socceroos finished second. As the tournament was the qualifier for 1991 FIFA Women's World Cup, Australia missed out on the first women's world cup.

Her next game for the Australians was in the 1994 OFC Women's Championship in Papua New Guinea in October, with Tom Sermanni coaching. They lost their first game against New Zealand, but won the second. Wheeler's team won both games against the hosts, Papua New Guinea. As Australia's goal difference was superior to New Zealand they won the tournament and qualified for the 1995 FIFA Women's World Cup – their first appearance. At that world cup, held in Sweden in June, the Matildas lost all three group stage games and were eliminated.

For the 1998 OFC Women's Championship, held in New Zealand in October, Wheeler only played in the first game, which was a 21–0 victory against American Samoa – the Matildas highest ever score. She was replaced by Belinda Kitching for the rest of the tournament, which Australia won, again. Upon winning that championship, Matildas qualified for the 1999 FIFA Women's World Cup in the United States in June–July. Wheeler only kept for the first group stage game – a 1–1 draw against Ghana. Australia, with Kitching, lost the remaining two group matches and were eliminated.

As the host nation the Matildas automatically qualified for the 2000 Summer Olympics with Wheeler in the squad. In their group they faced Germany (0–3), Sweden (1-1) and Brazil (1–2) – they finished bottom of their group and were eliminated. Wheeler retired from international football after the Olympics. During her tenure as Australia's goalkeeper she maintained 16 clean sheets. In 2008 she was inducted into the Football Federation of Australia's Hall of Fame.

== See also ==
- Australia at the 2000 Summer Olympics
