= History of soccer in Newcastle, New South Wales =

The sport of soccer (association football) has had a long history in the Newcastle, New South Wales and the wider Hunter Region. The area has had a number of teams involved in national competitions from 1978 through to the present day, being represented by the Newcastle Jets in the A-League.

Previous NSL clubs have included Newcastle KB United, Adamstown Rosebuds (as Newcastle Rosebud United) and the Newcastle Breakers. In 2000 Newcastle United were formed who survived the end of the NSL in 2004 and currently play in the A-League competition.

== Pre NSL Events ==
In 1951 a group of immigrants from different backgrounds from the Greta camp came together to form a soccer team.

"And so the Austral club were born. Originally accepted into the north NSW second division, the club eventually rose to prominence. They won their first northern NSW first division grand final in 1966 and followed suit in 1969. Continuing to thrive throughout the seventies and eighties, Austral searched for higher-ranked company. In 1988 Newcastle Austral entered the NSW state league first division, reaching the semi-finals at their first attempt!"

== Newcastle KB United ==
Newcastle KB United
- Full name: Newcastle KB United
- Nickname: KB
- Founded: 1977
- Dissolved: 1984
- Ground: International Sports Centre, Newcastle
- League: National Soccer League
Home colours	Away colours

The first Newcastle-based team to play in a national league was Newcastle KB United which was formed in 1978, one year after the inception of the National Soccer League (NSL). KB United had a strong following in their initial seasons with a crowd of over 15,000 attending the first home game at the International Sports Centre on 5 March 1978, with fans turning out to see a 4–1 loss to Hakoah Eastern Suburbs During the first seasons crowds were good including a record crowd of over 18,000 in 1979 with season averages around 10,000. English star Bobby Charlton and local prodigy Craig Johnston both played at least one game for KB United.

KB United were generally a mid to low table team although they did have some success in the national cup competition in 1984, travelling to Melbourne to defeat Melbourne Knights 1–0 to claim their only piece of silverware.

Due to an poor team performance and increasing financial troubles KB United's NSL licence was taken over in April 1984 by Adamstown Rosebuds who renamed themselves Newcastle Rosebud United while they played in the NSL. The Rosebuds could not return to prominence in the National League and were subsequently relegated in 1986.

=== League and Cup Placings ===
Brackets indicate total number of teams in competition

Year	Position	W	D	L	GF	GA	Cup Pos	Ave Home Crowd
1978	11 (14)	6	10	10	33	40	=3 (32)	8500
1979	6 (14)	11	9	6	43	30	=3 (32)	10200
1980	6 (14)	12	6	8	32	31	=9 (32)	6400
1981	10 (16)	11	8	11	41	41	=29 (36)	5300
1982	12 (16)	10	7	13	43	52	=9 (16)	4400
1983	5 (16)	14	7	9	45	26	=5 (16)	2900
1984 † ‡	8 (12)	11	4	13	35	52	1 (24)	1700
1985 † ‡	12 (12)	4	4	14	20	45	=3 (24)	1500
1986 † ‡	6 (12)	9	6	7	36	33	=9 (32)	1800

- † NSL divided into 2 conferences with Newcastle in the Northern Conference.
- ‡ From six matches through 1984 season as Newcastle Rosebud United

== Newcastle Breakers ==
Newcastle Breakers
- Full name: Newcastle Breakers FC
- Nickname: The Breakers
- Founded: 1991
- Dissolved: 2000
- Ground: Breakers Stadium, Newcastle
- Manager: Lee Sterrey
- League: National Soccer League
Home colours	Away colours

The licence was then taken over in 1987 by an organisation who named themselves Newcastle Football Ltd. They played in the NSW State League after Newcastle Rosebuds were relegated from the Northern Conference of the National Soccer League. 1988 saw the move to the Newcastle Australs. As Newcastle Australs, they also played in the NSW State League until 1991. Five years without a national representative, the Newcastle Breakers were then formed out of that NSW state league club Newcastle Australs. The Breakers played home games at Breakers Stadium in Birmingham Gardens, a suburb in the far west of the city. Since the Breakers' demise in 2000 the stadium was left dormant until 2005 when it was redeveloped into a greyhound racing facility. Aside from the main grandstand and lighting fixtures all infrastructure from the Breakers has been removed.

=== League and Cup placings ===
Brackets indicate total number of teams in competition

Year	Position	W	D	L	GF	GA	Cup Pos	Ave Home Crowd
1991-92	11 (14)	7	8	11	28	39	=8 (14)	4200
1992-93	8 (14)	10	8	8	38	29	=9 (14)	3700
1993-94	12 (14)	5	8	13	28	47	=8 (14)	2800
1995-96	12 (12)	4	5	24	35	77	2 (12)	3700
1996-97	11 (14)	7	9	10	40	46	?	?
1997-98	13 (14)	4	9	13	30	50	?	?
1998-99	8 (15)	11	7	10	29	33	?	?
1999-2000	7 (16)	14	9	11	44	44	?	?

Note: The Breakers did not play in the 1994–95 season of the NSL.

== Newcastle United ==
The Newcastle United club Crest

Newcastle United was formed in 2000 by Cypriot-Australian businessman Con Constantine from the remnants of the Newcastle Breakers club. The Breakers was dissolved when Soccer Australia revoked its NSL licence at the conclusion of the 1999/2000 season. At the formation of Newcastle United the home ground was moved back to where Newcastle KB United played, now known as EnergyAustralia Stadium.

=== League Placings ===
Brackets indicate total number of teams in competition

Newcastle United Strip 2000-04

Year	Position	W	D	L	GF	GA
2000-01	14 (15)	5	9	14	37	56
2001-02 †	2 (13)	10	12	2	33	21
2002-03 ‡	4 (13)	10	7	7	37	25
2003-04	11 (13)	6	6	12	18	33

- † Newcastle United made the finals for the first time, After losing 4–3 against Perth Glory in the two legged Major Semi-Final, Newcastle were eliminated in the Preliminary Final by Sydney Olympic.
- ‡ Newcastle made the finals for the second year in succession. For this season a round robin contest between the top six was undertaken to see who would be Grand Finalists. Newcastle were placed sixth and last in this competition, although a washout game against Northern Spirit was never played as it did not affect the outcome of the top two.

== Newcastle United Jets ==
Newcastle United Jets FC
- Full name: Newcastle United Jets Football Club
- Nickname: Jets
- Founded: 2000
- Ground: EnergyAustralia Stadium, Newcastle
- Capacity: 33,000
- Owner: (Australia) Nathan Tinkler
- Manager: (Australia) Branko Culina
- League: A-League
- 2011-12: TBD
Home colours	Away colours

Newcastle United was renamed as Newcastle United Jets when it joined the A-League in its inaugural 2005-06 season. The club was renamed to project a new image and to prevent confusion with the English club Newcastle United.

The name "Jets" is a reference to RAAF Base Williamtown, located just 20 kilometres north of Newcastle. The club's logo depicts three F/A-18 Hornets, which the Royal Australian Air Force has based at Williamtown.

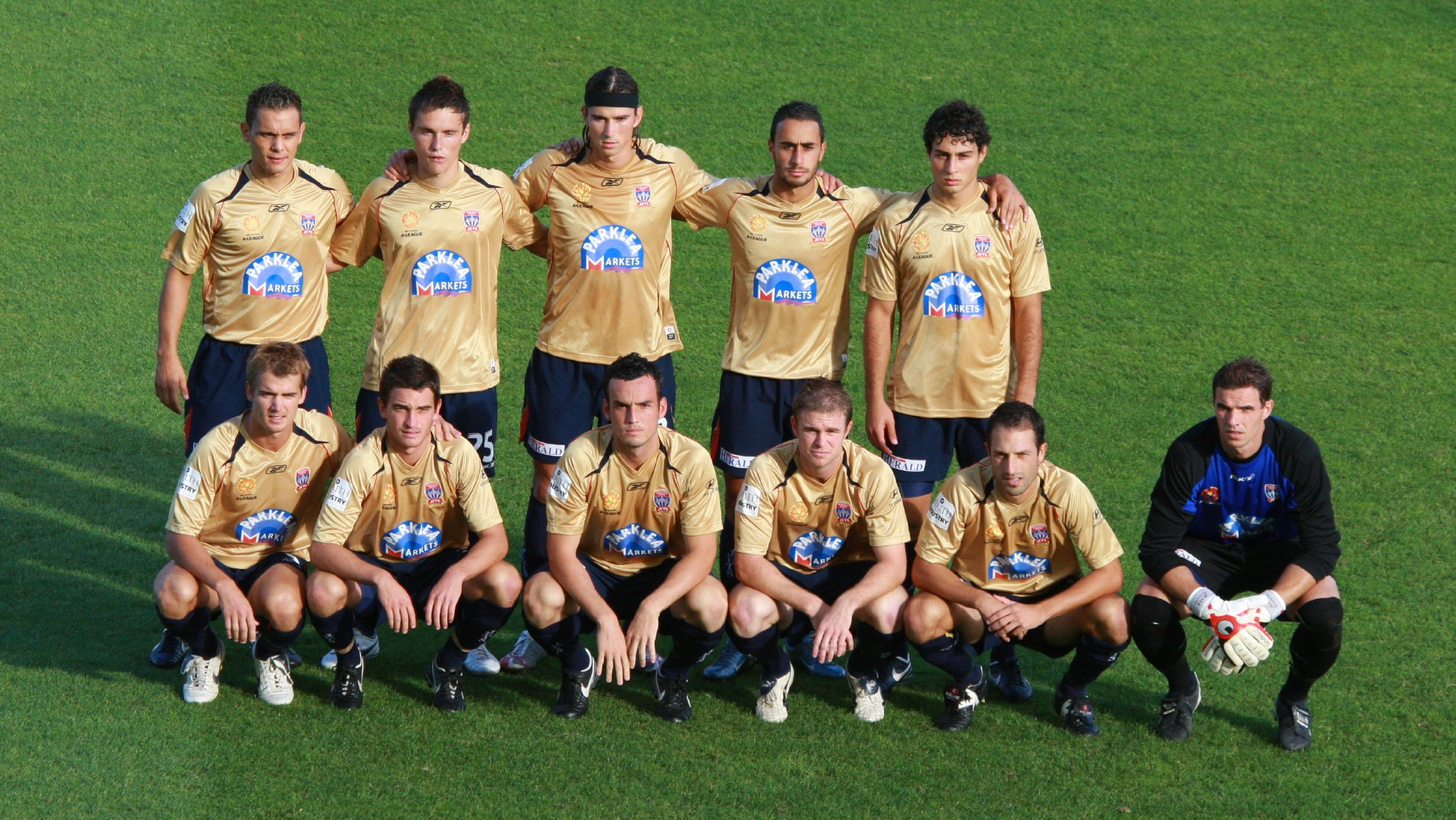
Newcastle Jets starting line-up for the 2008 Preliminary Final

Following the demise of the NSL in 2003-04 the Jets underwent a major overhaul. With all player contracts null and void following the end of the NSL each club had to recruit from scratch. Newcastle assembled an impressive squad with players such as Jade North, Nick Carle and notably, former Socceroo star Ned Zelic who became the inaugural captain. Englishman Richard Money was appointed coach with Gary van Egmond (former assistant to Ian Crook) his assistant. Rumour about the appointment of former England and Australia manager Terry Venables proved unfounded.

After the first regular season the Jets finished in 4th place and lost a two legged playoff with eventual runners up Central Coast Mariners. Following this, coach Richard Money left the club and was replaced by former NSL coach Nick Theodorakopoulos. Ned Zelic left the club but was replaced with players like Joel Griffiths, Paul Okon and Colombian Milton Rodriguez. Due to a poor start to the season Theodorakopoulos was sacked and his assistant van Egmond took over. The club saw a vast improvement over the rest of the regular season and finished third. Upon defeating Sydney FC in the minor semi-final the Jets then went on to lose the preliminary final to Adelaide United on penalties following a 1–1 draw.

Season three saw Okon retire and Rodriguez, and Carle leave leaving the Jets with a depleted squad. Con Constantine brought in former European Golden Boot winner Mario Jardel but he was clearly well past his prime and did not last the season out. Nevertheless, with a number of young players the Jets finished 2nd on goal difference after the regular season and were eventually crowned Champions after defeating now arch rivals Central Coast Mariners 1–0 in the Grand Final. A first for a Newcastle soccer team. In season 2008-09 the Jets will represent the A-League in the AFC Asian Champions League.

=== League Placings ===
Brackets indicate statistics including A-League finals.

Newcastle United Jets League History
Season	P	W	D	L	F	A	Teams	Minor Ladder Position	Finals Position	ACL Qualification	ACL Placing
2005-06	21 (23)	9 (9)	4 (5)	8 (9)	27 (28)	29 (31)	8	4th	Minor Semi-final	DNQ	n/a
2006-07	21 (24)	8 (9)	6 (6)	7 (9)	32 (36)	30 (33)	8	3rd	Preliminary Final	DNQ	DNQ
2007-08	21 (25)	9 (12)	7 (7)	5 (6)	25 (31)	21 (26)	8	2nd	Champions	Qualified for 2009	Round of 16
2008-09	21	0	0	0	0	0	8	8th	DNQ	DNQ	DNQ
