= Bankstown City FC (women) =

Women's soccer club based in Bankstown, Sydney

Bankstown City Lions Women's
- Full name: Bankstown City Lions Football Club
- Nicknames: Lions, Sydney Makedonia
- Founded: 2013
- Ground: Jensen Oval; Sefton, New South Wales
- Capacity: 8,000
- President: Robert Mileski
- Manager: Raffaele Cuomo
- League: NSW League One Women's
- 2025: 7th of 12
Home colours	Away colours

Bankstown City Lions Football Club, commonly referred to as Bankstown City Lions or simply Bankstown City, is an Australian women's football team from Bankstown, a suburb of Sydney, New South Wales, Australia. They compete in the NSW League One Women's, the third tier of women's football in Australia. Bankstown City Lions plays their home games at Jensen Park.

== History ==
The club formed women's teams in 2013. The senior team was promoted from the third tier Women's State League to the National Premier League 2 in 2015.

In 2017, they won the NPL2 Women's Championship after defeating Sydney Olympic and were promoted to the NPL1 Women's League for the following season. The 2018 NPL 1 Women's season saw Bankstown City Lions narrowly escape relegation by one point, finishing 10th out of 12 teams.

== Players ==
=== Current squad ===
As of 24 March 2024

Note: Flags indicate national team as defined under FIFA eligibility rules; some limited exceptions apply. Players may hold more than one non-FIFA nationality.

No.	Pos.	Nation	Player
1	GK	AUS	Stephanie Grimbilos
2	DF	ENG	Jess Frampton
3	DF	AUS	Stephanie Ambrose
4	DF	AUS	Zoe Zaczek
5	MF	AUS	Angelina Mastoris
6	MF	AUS	Liana Danaskos (captain)
8	MF	AUS	Skye Casacchia
9	FW	AUS	Roukayah Al Fararjeh
11	MF	AUS	Annabel Forbes
12	DF	AUS	Anjelica Williams
13	FW	AUS	Zali Dean

No.	Pos.	Nation	Player
15	MF	AUS	Chelsea Greguric
16	DF	AUS	Maryam Mostaghimi
18	FW	JPN	Aya Seino
20	GK	AUS	Jasmin Lawler
25	MF	AUS	Elif Erdogan
28	FW	AUS	Tori Hronopoulos
35	DF	AUS	Claire Witton
39	MF	AUS	Isabelle Zoghbi
41	MF	AUS	Heba El Saddik
44	MF	AUS	Jasmine Stretton

== Notable past players ==
- (Australia) Mary Fowler
- (Australia) Susan Phonsongkham
- (Australia) Olivia Price
- (Serbia) Vesna Milivojevic
- (New Zealand) Brianna Edwards

== Seasons ==
Season	League										Sapphire Cup	Top scorer	
Season	Div	P	W	D	L	F	A	Pts	Pos	Finals	Sapphire Cup	Player(s)	Goals
2013	Women's State League	22	14	3	5	83	33	45	4th	PF	-		
2014	Women's State League	22	15	2	4	105	32	47	2nd	RU	-		
2015	Women's State League	21	14	3	4	65	27	45	2nd↑	W	-		
2016	NPL2 NSW Women	20	5	4	11	26	37	19	7th	-	-		
2017	NPL2 NSW Women	16	8	4	4	39	26	28	3rd↑	W	-	Tania Baban	13
2018	NPL NSW Women	22	2	4	16	16	71	10	10th	-	-	Amy Dahdah	7
2019	NPL NSW Women	22	6	3	13	38	60	21	10th	-	-		
2020	NPL NSW Women	11	0	0	11	7	60	0	12th	-	-	Georgia Plessas	3
2021	NPL NSW Women	12	2	1	9	8	31	7	season cancelled		-	Georgia Plessas	3
2022	NPL NSW Women	22	10	4	8	34	33	6	6th	-	-		
2023	NPL NSW Women	26	8	13	5	41	27	37	8th (Note: Relegated based on Club Championship)	-	R4	Susan Phonsongkham	14
2024	NSW League One Women	26	19	1	6	95	20	58	3rd	-	-		
2025	NSW League One Women	24	10	4	10	30	32	34	7th	-	R2		

== Honours ==
- NSW Women's State League/ Champions: 2015
- NSW NPL 2 Women's/ Champions: 2017
