= Canterbury District Soccer Football Association =

Australian local sports governing body

- Formation: 1923
- Headquarters: Ashfield, New South Wales, Australia
- Parent organisation: Football NSW, Football Australia
- Website: https://www.footballcanterbury.com.au/

Canterbury District Soccer Football Association is a governing body and football (soccer) competition located in the Canterbury suburbs of Sydney. Its administrative headquarters are located at Pratten Park Bowls, Ashfield, New South Wales. All competitions and football activity is under control of Football New South Wales. The District Association consists of ten all ages competitions which corresponds to tiers six to fifteen on the Australian soccer pyramid. Clubs are located in the Burwood, Canada Bay, Canterbury-Bankstown, Inner West and Strathfield local council areas.

== History ==
Canterbury Districts Soccer Football Association was founded in 1922; the first year of competition was 1923.

== Teams and structure ==
=== Tiers ===
As of 2013, the Canterbury Districts Premier League and Premier League Reserves competitions have been scrapped to align with the national curriculum overhaul which included the introduction of the National Premier Leagues. The Canterbury Districts highest all ages competition sits on the sixth tier of the Australian soccer league system. There are a total of 12 all age divisions.

=== Leagues ===
Football Canterbury is responsible for overseeing all men's, women's and junior's competitions as well as small sided competitions.

=== Teams ===
Teams competing across all tiers and divisions are made up from these clubs:

- Abbotsford Football Club
- Ashfield Pirates Football Club
- Australian National Sports Club
- Australian Catholic University
- Balmain & District Football Club
- Belmore Eagles Football Club
- Belmore United Football Club
- Burwood Football Club
- Canterbury Football Club
- Concord Soccer Club
- Cooks River Titans Football Club
- Earlwood Wanderers Football Club
- Enfield Rovers Soccer Club
- Football Club Five Dock
- Fraser Park Football Club
- Future Leaders FC
- Hurlstone Park Wanderers Football Club
- Inter Lions Soccer Club
- Lakemba Sports and recreational Club
- Leichhardt Saints Football Club
- APIA Leichhardt Tigers Football Club
- Marrickville Football Club
- MRP FC
- Roseland Raptors Football Club
- Stanmore Hawks Football Club
- Strathfield Football Club
- Sydney Uni Soccer Football Club
- Sydney Rangers FC
- St Barnabas Football club
- St Patrick's FC
- Russell Lea Women's Soccer Club

Clubs may field more than one team per all ages division and may also not participate in each division

== Premiers ==
=== Premier League ===
- 2002: Belmore Eagles A
- 2003: Australian National Sports Club
- 2004: Abbotsford FC
- 2006: Concord
- 2007: Concord
- 2011: Enfield
- 2012: Enfield (def. Inter Lions 6–1 in grand final)

== Bill Brackenbury Premier League ==
As of 2013, the Canterbury Districts Premier League and Premier League Reserves competitions have been scrapped to align with the national curriculum overhaul which included the introduction of the National Premier Leagues. With that in 2014 Football Canterbury came up with a new name for it senior men football competition they originally called it the Bill Brackenbury Cup and then in 2025 they changed the name to the Bill Brackenbury Premier League. Inter Lions have been the most successful club in the BBPL with 6 championship and premiership.

=== Bill Brackenbury Cup Champions ===
- 2014: Inter Lions
- 2015: Inter Lions
- 2016: Inter Lions
- 2017: Inter Lions
- 2018: Inter Lions
- 2019: Inter Lions
- 2020: Strathfield FC
- 2021: Enfield Rovers (no final series due to Covid-19 season abandonment)
- 2022: Hurlstone Park Wanderers
- 2023: Enfield Rovers FC
- 2024: Hurlstone Park Wanderers
- 2025: Strathfield FC
- 2026: Hurlstone Park Wanderers

=== League Premiers ===
- 2014: Inter Lions
- 2015: Inter Lions
- 2016: Inter Lions
- 2017: Inter Lions
- 2018: Inter Lions
- 2019: Inter Lions
- 2020: Strathfield FC
- 2021: n/a
- 2022: Hurlstone Park Wanderers
- 2023: Hurlstone Park Wanderers
- 2024: Belmore Eagles
- 2025: Hurlstone Park Wanderers
- 2026: Hurlstone Park Wanderers

== Grace Martin Premier League ==
The Grace Martin Trophy is awarded to the Champions of the Canterbury District's highest division of senior women. Leichhardt Saints FC have been the most successful club, winning it 11 out of the 13 times the competition has been running. Hurlstone Park (2014) and Concord (2022) have been the only other teams to have won trophy, with Balmain (2017) the only team to have won the premiers plate besides Leichhardt Saints.

=== Grace Martin Trophy Champions ===
- 2014: Hurlstone Park Wanderers
- 2015: Leichhardt Saints
- 2016: Leichhardt Saints
- 2017: Leichhardt Saints
- 2018: Leichhardt Saints
- 2019: Leichhardt Saints
- 2020: Leichhardt Saints
- 2021: Leichhardt Saints (no finals series due to Covid-19 season abandonment)
- 2022: Concord JFC
- 2023: Leichhardt Saints
- 2024: Leichhardt Saints
- 2025: Leichhardt Saints
- 2026: Leichhardt Saints

=== League Premiers ===
- 2014: Leichhardt Saints
- 2015: Leichhardt Saints
- 2016: Leichhardt Saints
- 2017: Balmain DFC
- 2018: Leichhardt Saints
- 2019: Leichhardt Saints
- 2020: Leichhardt Saints
- 2021: n/a
- 2022: Leichhardt Saints
- 2023: Leichhardt Saints
- 2024: Leichhardt Saints
- 2025: Leichhardt Saints
- 2026: Leichhardt Saints

== State Cup winners ==
Teams have represented the Canterbury District at State Cup tournaments since its foundation in 1957. Hurlstone Park Wanderers managed to win the U-21s foundation title that year.

Club	Total number of titles	Years and competition
Burwood FC	2	2007 (U-16s), 2011 (U-21s)
Canterbury FC	2	1981 (Amateur), 1984 (U-16s)
Earlwood Wanderers	4	1973 (U-21s), 1982 (U-14s), 2011 (U-11s) 2024(U-13)
Enfield FC	1	2023 (U-16)
Five Dock RSL	1	2002 (U-18s)
Glebe	1	1972 (Amateur)
Hurlstone Park Wanderers	3	1957 (U-21s), 2005 (U-12s Women's, U-14s Women's)
Lakemba Sports & Recreation Club	1	2018 Crystal Cup
Leichhardt Saints	1	2004 (U-12's Women's)
Leichhardt Tigers	5	2009, 2010 (U-12's), 2015 ,2018 ,2024(Over 35s)
Marrickville FC	1	1965 (U-21s)
Strathfield FC	1	2000 (U-16s Women's)
Western Suburbs†	1	1969 (U-21s)

- † Club has dissolved
- Glebe are no longer a part of the Canterbury Districts Soccer Football Association

== Champion of Champions ==
Teams have represented the Canterbury District at Champion of Champions since commencing in 1968. Earlwood Wanderes won the All age men foundation title and Belmore Eagles won the U-14 Boys foundation title respectively. There have been a total of 58 different winner with Inter lions and Enfield Rover both winning 8 times.

Clubs	Number of titles	Year and competition
Inter Lions	8	1996 (U-14) 1998 (U-16) 2005 (U-18) 2006 (U-18 Girls) 2009 (U-17), 2010 (U-10) 2012,2014 (Over 45s)
Enfield	8	1985 (U-8) 1986 (U-9) 1995 (U-11) 1996(U-12) 1997 (U-17) 1999 (U-16) 2022 ,2023 (U-16)
Earlwood Wanderers	7	1968 (AAM) 1975 (U-13) 1982 (U-9) (U-13) 2011 (U11) 2018 (U-15 Girls) 2019 (U-16)
Hurlstone Park Wanderers	6	1970 (AAM) 2004 (U-14) 2008 (U-21) 2008,2011 (U-18 Girls) 2012 (U-21 Women)
APIA Leichhardt FC	5	1972 (U-9) 1976 (U-13) 1986 (U-12) 1987 (U-11) 1990 (U-12)
APIA Leichhardt JFC	5	1985 (U-11) 1997 (U-11) 2009 (U-16) 2015,2017 (Over 35s)
Burwood FC	4	2005( U-14) 2006 (U-15) 2007 (U-16) 2011(U-21)
FC Five Dock	3	1976 (U-9) 1979 (U-10) 1980 (U-11)
Belmore Eagles	3	1968 (U-14) 1970 (U-16) 1983 (U-13)
LFC sports	1	1972 (U-13)
Western Suburbs †	1	1978 (U-12)
Canterbury Lions	1	1983 (U-14)
Concord JSC	1	1983 (U-18)
Campsie †	1	1995 (U-16)
Belmore Hercules †	1	1996 (U-15)
Abbotsford JFC	1	2017 (U-18)
Balmain DFC	1	2018 (U-12)
Puglia †	1	1988 (U-16)

- † Club has dissolved
