= Nepean Football Association =

Sports governing body in Australia

- Formation: 1961
- Headquarters: Penrith, New South Wales, Australia
- Parent organisation: Football NSW, FFA
- Website: Official Website

Nepean Football Association (NFA) is the governing body of amateur football across the Penrith, Hawkesbury and Blue Mountains areas of western Sydney. Clubs are located in four council areas, City of Penrith, City of Blue Mountains, City of Hawkesbury and Wollondilly Shire. Its administrative offices are located in Penrith.

== History ==
Nepean Junior Soccer Association was formed 9 November 1961 with the first competitions commencing in 1962. They were later to be known as Nepean District Soccer Association, then Nepean District Soccer Football Association before settling on Nepean Football Association (2014) as the word football steadily replaces soccer across Australia.

== Clubs and competitions ==
=== Nepean FC ===
NFA are responsible for the administration and running of Nepean FC who were formed in 2011 and as at 2025 compete in NSW League Two for Men, the Women's NSW League One and Boys Youth NSW League Two competition.

=== Competitions ===
NFA organises football across all competitions including Mini Roos (ages 5–11), competitive junior football for boys and girls (ages 12–17), intermediate age groups (ages 18–21), men (including over 35s) and women. As at 2018 there were 13 men's divisions, 5 men's over 35's divisions and 5 women's divisions. In 2017 there were 12,223 registered players in the Nepean area across 31 clubs.

The association also conducts activities for athletes with special needs with the Nepean Dragons Football group. They run a summer football competition at two venues (Penrith & Springwood) along with other venues in the Hawkesbury and Blue Mountains.

=== Current clubs ===
The following clubs currently have teams participating in NFA competitions:

Club	Founded	Home ground	Local government area
Blaxland FC	1969	St Johns Oval, Blaxland (Home ground); Glenbrook Oval, Glenbrook (Alternative ground)	Blue Mountains
Bligh Park FC	1990	Berger Road, South Windsor	Hawkesbury
Blue Mountains FC (formed as Lapstone United SC)	1965	Knapsack Park, Glenbrook	Blue Mountains
Colo SFC		Cougar Park, North Richmond	Hawkesbury
Cranebrook United SC	1980	Andromeda Oval, Cranebrook	Penrith
Emu Plains FC	1969	Hunter Field, Emu Plains	Penrith
Glenmore Park FC	1994	Mulgoa Rise Fields, Glenmore Park	Penrith
Glossodia FC	1983	Woodbury Oval, Glossodia	Hawkesbury
Hazelbrook FC	1958	Gloria Park, Hazelbrook (Home); Lawson Oval, Lawson (Alternative)	Blue Mountains
Henry Lawson FC	1978	Parkes Avenue, Werrington	Penrith
Jamisontown FC	1981	Eileen Cammack Reserve, South Penrith	Penrith
Jordan Springs Joeys FC	1971	Village Oval, Jordan Springs	Penrith
Lowland Wanderers	2008	Bensons Lane, Richmond	Hawkesbury
Mulgoa Valley FC	1985	Gow Park, Mulgoa	Penrith
Nepean Dragons	2007	Jamison Park, Penrith	Penrith
Penrith FC	1968	Jamison Park, Penrith	Penrith
Penrith R.S.L. SC	1963	Jamison Park, Penrith	Penrith
Penrith Rovers FC	1999	Parke Street Reserve, Kingswood	Penrith
Pitt Town FC	1990	Oakville Reserve, Oakville (Home); Pitt Town & District Sports Club Oval, Pitt Town (Alternative)	Hawkesbury
Richmond Ex-Servicemens SC (formed as Belmont Rangers)	1967	Icely Park, Richmond	Hawkesbury
Springwood United FC	1968	Summerhayes Park, Winmalee	Blue Mountains
St Clair United SC	1979	Mark Leece Sporting Complex, St Clair	Penrith
St Marys Band Club Rangers FC	1960	Kevin Dwyer Park, Colyton	Penrith
St Marys Convent FC	1962	Myrtle Street Fields, Claremont Meadows	Penrith
St Marys SC	1962	Potter Field, St Marys	Penrith
St Paul's Grammar School	1983	St Paul's Grammar School, Cranebrook	Penrith
Warradale FC	1983	Waterboard Oval, Warragamba	Wollondilly
Wentworth Falls FC	1975	Pitt Park, Wentworth Falls	Blue Mountains
Werrington Croatia FC	1974	Luddenham Oval, Orchard Hills	Penrith
Wilberforce United SC	1977	Woodlands Park, Wilberforce	Hawkesbury
Wollemi FC	1999	Wollemi Soccer Club, Werrington	Penrith

=== Defunct or former clubs ===
- Blue Mountains Grammar School SC
- Cherrywood Soccer Club
- Claremont Meadows Soccer Club
- Londonderry Soccer Club
- Western Storm Soccer Club
- Blackheath Football Club (now participates in Lithgow District Football Association)

== Notable players ==
The following players have played football for clubs in the NFA who have gone on to represent the Australian Men's and Women's National Teams:

- Leah Blayney - Wentworth Falls Football Club
- Mark Bridge - St Marys Soccer Club
- Luke Casserly - Colo Soccer Football Club
- Michael Gibson - Penrith RSL Soccer Club
- Ian Hunter - Blue Mountains Football Club
- Jenna Kingsley - Emu Plains Football Club & Penrith RSL Soccer Club
- Mark Schwarzer - Colo Soccer Football Club
- Mile Jedinak - Werrington Football Club
- Teigen Allen - Emu Plains Football Club
- Bryleeh Henry - Penrith Football Club
- Josh Nisbet - St Marys Football Club
- Patrick Beach - Glenmore Park Football Club
