= South Coast Flame FC =

- Full name: South Coast Flame FC
- Nickname: The Flame
- Founded: 2017; 9 years ago
- Ground: Ian McLennan Oval Kembla Grange, New South Wales
- Owner: Eddy De Gabriele
- Chairman: Tony Deliseo
- Head Coach: Darren Jones
- League: NSW League Two
- 2025: 6th of 15
- Website: https://southcoastflamefc.com.au/

South Coast Flame FC are a soccer team based in the Illawarra, New South Wales. They compete in the NSW State League or the fourth tier of men's soccer within Football NSW. The club was founded in 2017 and is run by the Football South Coast.

== Foundation ==
South Coast Flame FC was launched by Football South Coast in an attempt to create a pathway for the numerous junior teams which compete in the Skills Acquisition Program (SAP) and Association Youth League (AYL); and to indirectly compete with the established elite club in the area, the Wollongong Wolves. Football South Coast owner and chairman, Eddy De Gabriele said at the announcement of the club, “Like any start up, it is exciting and frightening but we decided that we have got to provide opportunities for the large number of players in the region.”

== Current squad ==
Correct as of 20 February 2018 Source: Note: Flags indicate national team as defined under FIFA eligibility rules; some limited exceptions apply. Players may hold more than one non-FIFA nationality.

No.	Pos.	Nation	Player
1	GK	AUS	Matt White (C)
2	MF	AUS	Andrew Bova
3	DF	AUS	Darren Jones
5	DF	AUS	Cameron Hanson
6	MF	AUS	Doug Woodiwiss
7	MF	AUS	Dion Sterjovski
9	FW	AUS	Bojan Caric

No.	Pos.	Nation	Player
10	MF	AUS	Matt Mazevski
11	MF	AUS	Julio Mushaba
12	DF	AUS	Martin Thompson
14	DF	AUS	Kenneth James
16	MF	AUS	Caleb Grace
17	DF	AUS	Djordje Uzelac
18	FW	AUS	Louis Connell
35	FW	AUS	Wade Wilton
