= Southern Districts Raiders FC =

SD Raiders FC
- Full name: Southern Districts Raiders FC
- Nickname: Raiders
- Founded: 2012 (as Southern Bulls)
- Ground: Ernie Smith Reserve, Moorebank
- Capacity: 1,000
- Coach: Goran Ljuboja
- League: NPL NSW (men's); FNSW NSW League One (women's)
- 2025 2026: 2nd of 16; NSW League One (promoted via playoff) (men's); 1st of 13 (premiers) (women's)
- Website: https://sdraiders.com.au/

Southern Districts Raiders Football Club, is a semi-professional soccer club, based and located in the Moorebank area of New South Wales. The club currently competes in the New South Wales National Premier Leagues in 2026 season. In season 2019, they played in the New South Wales National Premier Leagues 3 competition. In current season 2020, they competed in the New South Wales National Premier Leagues 2 competition.

The club is the representative team of the Southern Districts Soccer Football Association (SDSFA).

== Senior Team History ==
In 2012, SDSFA entered a joint Venture with State League side Fairfield Bulls to form Southern Bulls, competing in State League One.

In 2014 the partnership fell apart with SD Raiders taking over the name in 2016.

The Technical Director for the club is former Socceroo and Sydney FC player Nick Carle.

In 2015, as Southern Bulls, they finished third yet won through to the grand final where they defeated Dunbar Rovers 2–0.

In 2016, they again finished third however, as winners of the Club Championship (now playing as SD Raiders), won promotion to the NPL NSW 3.

In 2018 SD Raiders qualified for the grand final, losing 2-0 to St George City.

The following year they finished second in the competition and again played in the grand final, this time winning 3-1 over premiers, Stanmore Hawks. Additionally, as the winners of the Club Championship, they achieved promotion to the NPL2 competition for season 2020.

== Men's Squad ==
Note: Flags indicate national team as defined under FIFA eligibility rules; some limited exceptions apply. Players may hold more than one non-FIFA nationality.

No.	Pos.	Nation	Player
1	GK	AUS	Michael Figueira
4	DF	AUS	Cooper Hanagan
5	DF	AUS	Jett Mccue-Shore
6	MF	AUS	Lachlan Everett
8	DF	AUS	James Letta
7	MF	AUS	Michael Marcic
10	MF	AUS	Luka Knezevic
12	DF	AUS	Lachlan McGrath
14	FW	AUS	Noah Chianese
15	DF	AUS	Matthew Lee
17	MF	AUS	Martin Fernandez
19	FW	AUS	Riley Cox-Barlow
21	MF	AUS	Sebastian Malfara
37	FW	AUS	Robert Eremugo
47	FW	AUS	Ethan Beaven

== Women's Squad ==
Note: Flags indicate national team as defined under FIFA eligibility rules; some limited exceptions apply. Players may hold more than one non-FIFA nationality.

No.	Pos.	Nation	Player
1	GK	AUS	Natasha Pentecost
2	MF	AUS	Sharina Harris
3	DF	AUS	Mia Mastoris
6	DF	AUS	Jessica Neville
7	FW	AUS	Abigail Boag
8	MF	AUS	Layne Knight
9	MF	IRL	Aoife Horgan

No.	Pos.	Nation	Player
10	FW	BRA	Taiana Almeida
11	FW	SSD	Abuk Nyor
14	FW	AUS	Sarah Mandile
16	DF	GRE	Jasmin Zouroudis
19	DF	AUS	Brittany Duggan
22	MF	IRL	Erin Phelan
33	DF	AUS	Elena Topaladis

== Honours ==
=== Men's ===
- NSW State League 2

Champions (1): 2015

- NSW State League

Club Champions (1): 2016

- National Premier Leagues NSW 3

Champions (1): 2019

- National Premier Leagues NSW 3

Club Champions (1): 2019

=== Women's ===
Football NSW League One

Premiers (1) 2026
