= Inter Lions SC =

Inter Lions FC
- Full name: Inter Lions Football Club
- Nicknames: ILFC, Inter
- Founded: 1983
- Ground: Majors Bay Reserve, Concord Oval & Ron Routley Oval, Sydney, Australia.
- Coach: Shane Cevenini
- League: NSW League One
- 2026: 10th of 16
- Website: https://www.interlions.com.au/
Home colours	Away colours

Inter Lions Football Club Inc is a semi-professional soccer club based in Concord, New South Wales, Australia (Canada Bay Area of Sydney). Established in 1983 as Majors Bay Soccer Club, the club changed to its current name in 1995. The club's home kit borrows the colours of Inter Milan; blue and black vertical stripes. As of the 2023 season, the club is currently competing in the NSW League One, NSW Women's Premier League 2, NPL 3 Boys' youth League and the Canterbury District Soccer Football Association.

The club also competes in community football within the Canterbury District Association from U6s through to all age men's and women's, including small-sided football for juniors 5 to 11-year-olds, both boys and girls. Junior and senior competition sides range from 12 years of age through to adult age teams, males and females. The club provides teams for veteran age groups, namely U35's and over 45's, again for both men and women.

== Honours ==
=== Regional ===
- NSW Division State League 1/NPL 3/NSW League Two
  - Premiers (1): 2022
- NSW Division State League 2/NPL 4/NSW League Three
  - Premiers (1): 2004
- NSW Division State League 3
  - Premiers (1): 2003

Champions (1): 2003
