= 2015 Football NSW season =

Football New South Wales
- Season: 2015
- Champions: Bonnyrigg White Eagles

The Football NSW 2015 season was the third season of football in New South Wales under the banner of the National Premier Leagues. The competition consisted of four divisions across the state of New South Wales, excluding those regions affiliated with the Northern NSW Football federation.

Blacktown City were Premiers of the 1st Division, and qualified for the National Premier Leagues finals series. Blacktown City won this competition, becoming the 2015 National Premier Leagues Champion, and additionally received a spot in the 2016 FFA Cup (entering at the Round of 32).

== Pre-Season Changes ==
League	Promoted to league	Relegated from league
NPL NSW Men's 1	Parramatta FC	St George FC
NPL NSW Men's 2	Hakoah Sydney City East FC	Hills Brumbies FC
NSW State League Division 1	Rydalmere Lions	Camden Tigers
NSW State League Division 2	Dunbar Rovers; FC Gazy Lansvale; Wagga City Wanderers	Enfield Rovers; Southern Branch

== League Tables ==
=== 2015 National Premier League NSW Men's 1 ===
The National Premier League New South Wales 2015 season was played over 22 rounds, from March to August 2015.

NPL NSW Men's 1
- Season: 2015
- Champions: Bonnyrigg White Eagles
- Premiers: Blacktown City
- Relegated: Marconi Stallions
- Matches: 96
- Goals: 344 (3.58 per match)
- Top goalscorer: Blake Powell (21 goals)
- Biggest home win: 4-0 (Bonnyrigg v Marconi R.2)
- Biggest away win: 0-4 (Parramatta v Sydney Olympic R.2)
- Highest scoring: 2-5 (Marconi Stallions v APIA Leichhardt R.3)

Pos	Team	Pld	W	D	L	GF	GA	GD	Pts	Qualification or relegation
1	Blacktown City	22	15	5	2	54	23	+31	50	2015 National Premier Leagues Finals
2	APIA Leichhardt Tigers	22	13	6	3	56	31	+25	45	2015 NSW Finals
3	Bonnyrigg White Eagles (C)	22	13	4	5	49	35	+14	43	2015 NSW Finals
4	Sydney Olympic	22	13	3	6	45	31	+14	42	2015 NSW Finals
5	South Coast Wolves	22	9	5	8	31	36	−5	32	2015 NSW Finals
6	Rockdale City Suns	22	9	3	10	31	33	−2	30	
7	Sydney United 58	22	9	1	12	38	45	−7	28	
8	Manly United	22	8	3	11	39	38	+1	27	
9	Blacktown Spartans	22	8	3	11	40	51	−11	27	
10	Sutherland Sharks	22	7	3	12	36	42	−6	24	
11	Parramatta FC	22	5	5	12	22	35	−13	20	
12	Marconi Stallions (R)	22	2	1	19	14	55	−41	7	Relegated to the 2016 NPL NSW 2 (Note: Promotion and Relegation system based on Club Championship and including points from U20 and U18 teams.)

Source: foxsportspulse.com
Rules for classification: 1) points; 2) goal difference; 3) number of goals scored.
(C) Champions; (R) Relegated

==== Results ====
Home \ Away	API	BLC	BLS	BWE	MAN	MAR	PAR	ROC	SCW	SUT	SYO	SYU
APIA Leichhardt Tigers		1–1	4–4	0–0	3–1	6–2	1–0	4–3	3–0	2–1	2–2	2–0
Blacktown City	3–1		3–0	1–1	1–4	1–0	3–1	0–0	4–0	4–1	4–2	3–2
Blacktown Spartans	1–5	0–4		3–5	3–2	2–1	1–0	4–2	1–1	2–5	3–4	2–4
Bonnyrigg White Eagles	0–3	2–2	2–1		2–1	4–0	3–1	0–3	3–1	3–2	3–1	1–3
Manly United	1–2	1–2	2–1	0–3		4–1	1–2	0–0	1–1	1–3	0–2	5–0
Marconi Stallions	2–5	0–5	0–3	1–2	0–2		1–2	0–1	0–1	1–2	0–2	1–3
Parramatta FC	2–4	0–1	0–0	5–3	2–2	0–0		0–1	0–0	1–1	0–4	1–2
Rockdale City Suns	2–4	1–1	0–1	0–4	4–0	0–1	0–1		1–3	3–0	2–1	4–2
South Coast Wolves	1–0	1–4	0–3	3–2	2–0	2–0	4–2	0–1		3–0	1–1	4–0
Sutherland Sharks	2–1	0–1	3–1	1–2	0–1	1–2	2–1	6–2	2–2		0–2	3–1
Sydney Olympic	2–1	4–0	3–2	2–2	1–5	5–1	0–1	1–0	3–0	2–1		1–0
Sydney United	1–1	1–6	1–2	1–2	3–5	2–0	1–0	0–1	5–1	3–0	3–0	

Source: socceraust.co.uk
Legend: Blue = home team win; Yellow = draw; Red = away team win.

==== Finals ====
Qualifying final
2	APIA Leichhardt Tigers	1
3	Bonnyrigg White Eagles	3
4	Sydney Olympic	2
5	South Coast Wolves	0

Major semi-final
1	Blacktown City	2
3	Bonnyrigg White Eagles	4
Minor semi-final
2	APIA Leichhardt Tigers	1
4	Sydney Olympic	0

Preliminary final
1	Blacktown City	6
2	APIA Leichhardt Tigers	1

Grand final
1	Blacktown City	0
3	Bonnyrigg White Eagles	2

==== Personnel and kits ====
Team	Manager	Captain	Kit manufacturer	Kit partner
APIA Leichhardt Tigers	(Scotland) Billy McColl	(Australia) Michael West	Givova	Wests Ashfield Leagues Club
Blacktown City	(Australia) Mark Crittenden	(Australia) Zach Cairncross	UniPro Sports	Nissan
Blacktown Spartans	(Australia) Ben de Haan	(Australia) Carlos Saliadarre	Elite Sportswear	H&M Civil
Bonnyrigg White Eagles	(Scotland) Brian Brown	(Australia) Chris Tadrosse	Legea	NSW Compensation Lawyers
Manly United	(Australia) Paul Dee	(Australia) Graeme Forbes	TeamRhino Sports	
Marconi Stallions	(Australia) Darren Locca	(Australia) James Chronopoulos	Erreà	Club Marconi
Parramatta FC	(Australia) Franco Cosentino	(Australia) TBA	Legea	TBA
Rockdale City Suns	(Australia) Branko Culina	(Turkey) Askin Oygur	Stobi Sports	Gregory Jewelers
South Coast Wolves	(Australia) Jacob Timpano	TBA	Dixon Sportswear	GPT Group
Sutherland Sharks	(Australia) Robbie Stanton	TBA	Macron	Pipe King
Sydney Olympic	(Australia) Grant Lee	(Australia) Petar Markovic	Adidas	Bank of Sydney
Sydney United 58	(Australia) Mark Rudan	TBA	Legea	BOKA Aluminium Windows

==== Top Scorers ====
Rank	Player	Club	Goals
1	(Australia) Blake Powell	APIA Leichhardt Tigers	21
2	(Australia) Joey Gibbs	Blacktown City	16
3	(Australia) Robert Younis	Bonnyrigg White Eagles FC	13
4	(Australia) Brendan Cholakian	Manly United	11
4	(Australia) Harris Gaitatzis	Sydney Olympic	11
4	(Australia) Marko Ješić	Rockdale City Suns	11
7	(Australia) Patrick Antelmi	Blacktown City	10
7	(Japan) Shu Sasaki	Blacktown Spartans	10

=== 2015 National Premier League NSW Men's 2 ===
NPL NSW Men's 2
- Season: 2015
- Champions: Northern Tigers
- Promoted: Hakoah Sydney City East

The 2015 National Premier League NSW Men's 2 was the third edition of the new NPL NSW 2 as the second level domestic association football competition in New South Wales. 12 teams competed, playing each other twice for a total of 22 rounds, with the top team at the end of the year promoted to the NPL NSW Men's 1 competition. Hakoah Sydney City East FC were promoted into the division after finishing 1st in the 2014 State League Division 1, and St George FC were relegated from the 2014 National Premier League's Men's 1.

Pos	Team	Pld	W	D	L	GF	GA	GD	Pts	Qualification or relegation
1	Spirit FC	22	16	3	3	50	16	+34	51	Qualified for the 2015 NPL NSW Men's 2 Finals
2	Hakoah Sydney City East (P)	22	13	4	5	38	24	+14	43	Promotion to the 2016 National Premier League (Note: Promotion and Relegation based on Club Championship and including points from U20 and U18 teams.)
3	Northern Tigers (C)	22	12	5	5	36	22	+14	41	Qualified for the 2015 NPL NSW Men's 2 Finals
4	Central Coast FC	22	12	1	9	43	36	+7	37	Qualified for the 2015 NPL NSW Men's 2 Finals
5	Bankstown City	22	10	6	6	37	20	+17	36	Qualified for the 2015 NPL NSW Men's 2 Finals
6	Fraser Park	22	9	4	9	34	34	0	31	
7	Bankstown Berries	22	9	4	9	32	37	−5	31	
8	Mt Druitt Town Rangers	22	8	4	10	30	42	−12	28	
9	Macarthur Rams	22	6	3	13	24	38	−14	21	
10	St George	22	6	3	13	26	41	−15	21	
11	Sydney University (R)	22	5	3	14	28	46	−18	18	Relegation to the 2016 NPL NSW 3
12	Mounties Wanderers	22	3	6	13	21	43	−22	15	

Source: foxsportspulse.com
Rules for classification: 1) points; 2) goal difference; 3) number of goals scored.
(C) Champions; (P) Promoted; (R) Relegated

==== Finals ====
Qualifying final
2	Hakoah Sydney City East	0
3	Northern Tigers	3
4	Central Coast	0
5	Bankstown City	1

Major semi-final
1	Spirit	1
3	Northern Tigers	5
Minor semi-final
2	Hakoah Sydney City East	1
5	Bankstown City	2

Preliminary final
1	Spirit	3
5	Bankstown City	5

Grand final
3	Northern Tigers	2
5	Bankstown City	1

=== 2015 NSW State League Division 1 ===
NSW State League Division 1
- Season: 2015
- Champions: North Shore Mariners
- Promoted: North Shore Mariners

The 2015 NSW State League Division 1 was the third edition of the State League to be incorporated under the National Premier Leagues banner. 12 teams competed, playing each other twice for a total of 22 rounds.

Pos	Team	Pld	W	D	L	GF	GA	GD	Pts	Qualification or relegation
1	North Shore Mariners (P, C)	22	18	3	1	63	24	+39	57	Promotion to the 2015 NPL NSW 2 (Note: Promotion and Relegation based on Club Championship and including points from U20 and U18 teams.)
2	Rydalmere Lions	22	12	4	6	47	33	+14	40	Qualified for the 2015 NSW State League Division 1 Finals
3	Hills United	22	11	2	9	54	37	+17	35	Qualified for the 2015 NSW State League Division 1 Finals
4	Balmain Tigers	22	10	4	8	40	32	+8	34	Qualified for the 2015 NSW State League Division 1 Finals
5	Dulwich Hill	22	10	4	8	41	38	+3	34	Qualified for the 2015 NSW State League Division 1 Finals
6	Stanmore Hawks	22	10	2	10	42	33	+9	32	
7	Hawkesbury City	22	9	3	10	30	39	−9	30	
8	Gladesville Ryde Magic	22	7	7	8	25	30	−5	28	
9	Inter Lions	22	6	7	9	31	42	−11	25	
10	Western NSW Mariners	22	7	4	11	36	58	−22	25	
11	Granville Rage	22	5	3	14	30	38	−8	18	
12	Nepean FC (R)	22	4	3	15	25	60	−35	15	Relegation to 2015 NSW State League

(C) Champions; (P) Promoted; (R) Relegated

==== Finals ====
Qualifying final
2	Rydalmere Lions	1
3	Hills Brumbies	4
4	Balmain Tigers	1
5	Dulwich Hill	0

Major semi-final
1	North Shore Mariners (a.e.t.)	2
3	Hills Brumbies	0
Minor semi-final
2	Rydalmere Lions	2
4	Balmain Tigers (a.e.t.)	3

Preliminary final
3	Hills Brumbies	4
4	Balmain Tigers	1

Grand final
1	North Shore Mariners	3
3	Hills Brumbies	2

=== 2015 NSW State League Division 2 ===
NSW State League Division 2
- Season: 2015
- Champions: Southern Bulls
- Promoted: Dunbar Rovers

The 2015 NSW State League Division 2 was the third edition of the State League to be incorporated under the National Premier Leagues banner. 10 teams competed, playing each other twice for a total of 18 matches.

Pos	Team	Pld	W	D	L	GF	GA	GD	Pts	Qualification or relegation
1	Dunbar Rovers (P)	18	13	4	1	50	11	+39	43	Promotion to the 2015 National Premier Leagues NSW 3 (Note: Promotion and Relegation based on Club Championship and including points from U20 teams.)
2	Hurstville FC	18	12	4	2	40	14	+26	40	Qualified for the 2015 NSW State League Division 2 Finals
3	Southern Bulls (C)	18	10	3	5	57	30	+27	33	Qualified for the 2015 NSW State League Division 2 Finals
4	Western Condors	18	9	4	5	44	27	+17	31	Qualified for the 2015 NSW State League Division 2 Finals
5	Prospect United	18	8	6	4	32	22	+10	30	
6	Camden Tigers	18	8	2	8	32	38	−6	26	
7	University of NSW	18	5	6	7	22	37	−15	21	
8	FC Gazy Lansvale	18	3	4	11	27	53	−26	13	
9	Hurstville City Minotaurs	18	3	1	14	23	59	−36	10	
10	Wagga City Wanderers	18	1	2	15	28	64	−36	5	

(C) Champions; (P) Promoted

==== Finals ====
Semi-finals
1	Dunbar Rovers (p)	2 (4)
2	Hurstville	2 (1)
3	Southern Bulls	5
4	Western Condors	0

Preliminary final
2	Hurstville	0
3	Southern Bulls	1

Grand final
1	Dunbar Rovers	0
3	Southern Bulls	2

=== 2015 National Premier Leagues NSW Women's 1 ===
National Premier Leagues NSW Women's 1
- Season: 2015
- Champions: Sydney University
- Premiers: Macarthur Rams

The 2015 National Premier League NSW Women's 1 was the second edition of the NPL NSW Women's competition to be incorporated under the National Premier Leagues banner. 10 teams competed, playing each other twice for a total of 18 rounds.

Pos	Team	Pld	W	D	L	GF	GA	GD	Pts	Qualification or relegation
1	Macarthur Rams	18	14	1	3	58	19	+39	43	Qualification for the 2015 NPL NSW Women's Finals
2	Blacktown Spartans	18	9	5	4	31	21	+10	32	Qualification for the 2015 NPL NSW Women's Finals
3	Sydney University (C)	18	9	4	5	43	29	+14	31	Qualification for the 2015 NPL NSW Women's Finals
4	Manly United	18	9	4	5	34	20	+14	31	Qualification for the 2015 NPL NSW Women's Finals
5	Illawarra Stingrays	18	9	3	6	57	48	+9	30	
6	North Shore Mariners	18	7	4	7	38	34	+4	25	
7	Emerging Jets	18	6	5	7	36	44	−8	23	
8	North West Sydney Koalas	18	5	4	9	27	27	0	19	
9	Football NSW Institute	18	5	1	12	34	55	−21	16	
10	Central Coast Mariners Academy (R)	18	1	1	16	16	77	−61	4	Relegation to 2016 NPL NSW Women's 2 competition

Source: sportstg.com
Rules for classification: 1) points; 2) goal difference; 3) number of goals scored.
(C) Champions; (R) Relegated

==== Finals ====
Semi-finals
1	Macarthur Rams	4
2	Blacktown Spartans	1
3	Sydney University (a.e.t.)	5
4	Manly United	4

Preliminary final
Blacktown Spartans	0
Sydney University	3

Grand final
Macarthur Rams	4
Sydney University	5

== 2015 Waratah Cup ==
Football NSW soccer clubs competed in 2015 for the Waratah Cup. The tournament doubled as the NSW qualifier for the 2015 FFA Cup, with the top five clubs progressing to the Round of 32. 104 clubs entered the qualifying phase, with the clubs entering in a staggered format (with NPL and NPL 2 clubs seeded to a later round). The five winners then were randomly drawn in order to create a preliminary fixture, before the semi-finals of the competition.

The competition was won by Sydney United 58, their 5th title, defeating Blacktown City.

In addition to the A-League clubs Central Coast Mariners, Sydney FC and Western Sydney Wanderers, the five qualifiers (Balmain Tigers, Blacktown City, Rockdale City Suns, Sydney Olympic and Sydney United 58 competed in the final rounds of the 2015 FFA Cup. Of these qualifying clubs, only Rockdale City Suns, Sydney Olympic and Sydney United 58 progressed to the Round of 16.

== Awards ==
The NPL Gala Dinner was held on 11 September at Rosehill Gardens, acknowledging achievements from across all NPL teams from Men's 1, Men's 2, Women's 1, Women's 2 and their respective youth teams.

=== National Premier Leagues NSW ===
Award	National Premier Leagues NSW		National Premier Leagues NSW 2	
Award	Men's	Women's	Men's	Women's
Club Championship (Note: Club Championship includes points from Under-20s and Under-18s.)	Blacktown City	Manly United	Hakoah Sydney City East	Marconi Stallions
Player of the Year	Franco Parisi (APIA Leichhardt)	Tara Pender (Blacktown Spartans)	Gosue Sama (Spirit FC)	Danni Wise (Southern Branch)
Golden Boot	Blake Powell (APIA Leichhardt – 21 goals)	Michelle Carney (Illawarra Stingrays – 19 goals)	Hussein Akil (Fraser Park FC – 13 goals)	Danielle Calvi (Sydney Olympic – 20 goals)
Goalkeeper of the Year	Nenad Vekic (Blacktown City)	Jada Whyman (Macarthur Rams)	David Lowery (Spirit FC)	Renee Krstanovska (Marconi Stallions)
Coach of the Year	Mark Crittenden (Blacktown City)	Jason Harrison (Emerging Jets)	Mark Robertson (Hakoah FC)	Michael McGovern (Sutherland Shire)
Referee of the Year	Kurt Ams	Katie-Louise Patterson	n/a	
Goal of the Year	Blake Powell (APIA Leichhardt)	—	n/a	
U-20's Golden Boot	Jonathan Grozdanovski (Blacktown City – 26 goals)	Amelia Vitek (North Shore Mariners – 19 goals)	Garang Awac (Mt Druitt Town Rangers – 15 goals)	Sarah Mandile (Inter Lions – 17 goals)
U-20's Player of the Year	Jonathan Grozdanovski (Blacktown City)	Natalie Penman (NWS Koalas)	Harry McAllister (Northern Tigers)	Marissa Saverino (Sutherland Shire)

=== Other Awards ===
Media Award	Nick Houghton
Charles Valentine Award	Charles Abdilla (Mounties Wanderers)
