= 2019 Football NSW season =

Football New South Wales
- Season: 2019

The Football NSW 2019 season was the seventh season of football in New South Wales under the banner of the National Premier Leagues. The competition consists of four divisions across the state of New South Wales.

Wollongong Wolves, as the Premiers of the NPL NSW Men's 1, qualified for the national finals, where they became the champion of the 2019 National Premier Leagues, and in doing so received an automatic spot in the 2020 FFA Cup.

Due to a restructure of Men's and Boys' competitions for the 2020 season, this was the last season that the Club Championship determined the teams for promotion and relegation.

== Competitions ==
=== 2019 National Premier League NSW Men's 1 ===
NPL NSW Men's 1
- Season: 2019
- Champions: APIA Leichhardt Tigers
- Premiers: Wollongong Wolves
- Matches: 126
- Goals: 389 (3.09 per match)
- Top goalscorer: Thomas James (22) (Wollongong Wolves)
- Biggest home win: Marconi Stallions 5–0 Sydney United 58 (13 April 2019)
- Biggest away win: Mt Druitt Town Rangers 2–6 Sydney Olympic (3 April 2019)
- Highest scoring: Mt Druitt Town Rangers 2–6 Sydney Olympic (3 April 2019)

==== Clubs ====
Team	Location	Stadium	Capacity	Head coach
APIA Leichhardt Tigers	Leichhardt	Lambert Park	7,000	(Australia) Billy McColl
Blacktown City	Seven Hills	Lily Homes Stadium	7,500	(Australia) Mark Crittenden
Hakoah Sydney City East	Eastgardens	Hensley Athletic Field	1,000	(Scotland) Gavin Rae
Marconi Stallions	Bossley Park	Marconi Stadium	9,000	(Australia) Peter Tsekenis
Mt Druitt Town Rangers	Emerton	Popondetta Park	2,500	Aidan Desmond
Manly United	Cromer	Cromer Park	5,000	(Australia) Paul Dee
Rockdale City Suns	Rockdale	Ilinden Sports Centre	5,000	(Australia) Nick Porreca (caretaker)
Sutherland Sharks	Miranda	Seymour Shaw Park	5,000	(Australia) Lee Sterry
Sydney Olympic	Belmore	Belmore Sports Ground	20,000	(Australia) Abbas Saad
Sydney United 58	Edensor Park	Sydney United Sports Centre	12,000	(Australia) Miro Vlastelica
Sydney FC Youth	Leichhardt	Lambert Park	7,000	(Australia) Jimmy van Weeren
Wollongong Wolves	Wollongong	WIN Stadium	23,000	(Australia) Luke Wilkshire

==== Coaching changes ====
Team	Outgoing manager	Manner of departure	Date of vacancy	Position in table	Incoming manager	Date of appointment
Rockdale City Suns	(Australia) Paul Reid	Sacked	8 April 2019	11th	(Australia) Nick Porreca (caretaker)	8 April 2019

==== League table ====
Pos	Team	Pld	W	D	L	GF	GA	GD	Pts	Qualification or relegation
1	Wollongong Wolves	22	16	3	3	52	17	+35	51	2019 National Premier Leagues Finals
2	APIA Leichhardt Tigers (C)	22	12	6	4	42	28	+14	42	2019 NSW Finals
3	Blacktown City	22	11	5	6	31	24	+7	38	2019 NSW Finals
4	Sydney United 58	22	9	6	7	31	32	−1	33	2019 NSW Finals
5	Marconi Stallions	22	10	2	10	42	30	+12	32	2019 NSW Finals
6	Sydney Olympic	22	9	5	8	35	33	+2	32	
7	Mt Druitt Town Rangers	22	8	6	8	43	46	−3	30	
8	Sutherland Sharks	22	7	7	8	36	33	+3	28	
9	Manly United	22	7	5	10	25	34	−9	26	
10	Rockdale City Suns	22	8	2	12	28	44	−16	26	
11	Sydney FC Youth	22	6	3	13	33	52	−19	21	
12	Hakoah Sydney City East (R)	22	3	2	17	12	37	−25	11	Relegation to the 2020 NPL NSW 2 (Note: Relegation based on Club Championship and including points from U20 and U18 teams.)

Source: sportstg.com
Rules for classification: 1) points; 2) goal difference; 3) number of goals scored.
(C) Champions; (R) Relegated

==== Results ====
Home \ Away	ALT	BLC	HSC	MUT	MST	MDT	RCS	SFY	SYO	SYU	SUT	WOL
APIA Leichhardt Tigers	—	1–1	3–0	1–1	1–0	3–2	4–0	2–2	3–1	1–0	2–2	0–3
Blacktown City	1–1	—	1–0	1–0	1–0	1–0	0–1	3–1	1–1	0–1	1–0	2–0
Hakoah Sydney City East	0–0	1–1	—	1–2	1–0	1–2	0–4	1–2	0–1	0–3	1–2	0–2
Manly United	0–1	1–0	2–1	—	1–0	2–2	0–2	1–1	1–2	3–0	0–5	0–4
Marconi Stallions	2–4	2–0	3–1	1–2	—	4–2	1–2	5–2	1–3	5–0	3–1	1–3
Mt Druitt Town Rangers	2–1	1–4	4–0	2–1	3–3	—	2–0	2–4	2–6	0–0	1–1	1–4
Rockdale City Suns	1–5	2–4	0–3	2–1	2–5	0–2	—	2–1	2–1	2–3	2–5	1–2
Sydney FC Youth	1–3	0–1	1–0	1–3	0–2	3–5	3–1	—	1–3	1–3	0–4	3–4
Sydney Olympic	3–1	3–3	1–0	2–2	0–1	2–2	1–0	2–3	—	2–1	0–1	0–2
Sydney United 58	1–3	2–4	2–0	3–1	0–0	3–1	0–0	0–2	1–1	—	1–1	2–2
Sutherland Sharks	1–2	2–1	0–1	0–0	0–3	2–4	1–1	1–1	3–0	2–3	—	2–2
Wollongong Wolves	4–0	4–0	1–0	2–1	1–0	1–1	0–1	4–0	2–0	1–2	4–0	—

Source: sportstg.com
Legend: Blue = home team win; Yellow = draw; Red = away team win.
For upcoming matches, an "a" indicates there is an article about the rivalry between the two participants.

==== Finals ====
Qualifying final
2	APIA Leichhardt Tigers (p)	1 (5)
3	Blacktown City	1 (3)
4	Sydney United 58 (a.e.t.)	2
5	Marconi Stallions	0

Major semi-final
1	Wollongong Wolves	0
2	APIA Leichhardt Tigers	1
Minor semi-final
3	Blacktown City	3
4	Sydney United 58 (a.e.t.)	7

Preliminary final
1	Wollongong Wolves	1
4	Sydney United 58	2

Grand final
2	APIA Leichhardt Tigers (a.e.t.)	2
4	Sydney United 58	1

===== Elimination final/Qualifying final =====
17 August 2019	Sydney United 58	2–0 (a.e.t.)	Marconi Stallions	Sydney United Sports Centre, Edensor Park
16:00	Antelmi 93', 112' (pen.)

17 August 2019	APIA Leichhardt Tigers	1–1 (a.e.t.) (5–3 p)	Blacktown City	Lambert Park, Leichhardt
19:00	Payne 102'		Gibbs 120+2'

===== Major/Minor semi-finals =====
21 August 2019	Wollongong Wolves	0–1	APIA Leichhardt Tigers	WIN Stadium, Wollongong
19:30		(Report)	Payne 81'

21 August 2019	Blacktown City	3–7 (a.e.t.)	Sydney United 58	Lily Homes Stadium, Seven Hills
19:30	Lewis 7'; Lynch 13'; Jennings 19'	(Report)	Simonoski 3', 17'; Uskok 73'; Antelmi 98'; Maia 100'; Sim 117', 118'

===== Preliminary final =====
24 August 2019	Wollongong Wolves	1–2	Sydney United 58	WIN Stadium, Wollongong
	Dimovski 43'		Rose 66'; Antelmi 80'

===== Grand final =====
31 August 2019	APIA Leichhardt Tigers	2–1 (a.e.t.)	Sydney United 58	Bankwest Stadium, Parramatta
18:00	Galimi 28'; Ucchino 95'		Bilic 57'	Attendance: 6,426

==== Top scorers ====
Rank	Player	Club	Goals
1	(England) Thomas James	Wollongong Wolves	22
2	(Australia) Chris Payne	APIA Leichhardt Tigers	20
3	(Spain) Álex Sánchez	Sydney Olympic	13
4	(Australia) Lachlan Scott	Wollongong Wolves	12

=== 2019 National Premier League NSW Men's 2 ===
NPL NSW Men's 2
- Season: 2019
- Champions: Hills United
- Premiers: North Shore Mariners
- Promoted: North Shore Mariners
- Matches: 154
- Goals: 496 (3.22 per match)

For the 2019 NPL NSW season 3 teams were relegated due to a change in the competition format for 2020.

==== League Table ====
Pos	Team	Pld	W	D	L	GF	GA	GD	Pts	Qualification or relegation
1	North Shore Mariners (P)	26	17	4	5	52	29	+23	55	Promotion to the 2020 NPL NSW 1 (Note: Promotion based on Club Championship and including points from U20 and U18.)
2	Hills United (C)	26	17	2	7	67	40	+27	53	2019 NPL NSW Men's 2 Finals
3	Bonnyrigg White Eagles	26	14	6	6	54	27	+27	48	2019 NPL NSW Men's 2 Finals
4	Mounties Wanderers	26	13	4	9	52	44	+8	43	2019 NPL NSW Men's 2 Finals
5	Spirit FC	26	13	4	9	48	44	+4	43	2019 NPL NSW Men's 2 Finals
6	Northern Tigers	26	11	9	6	41	33	+8	42	2019 NPL NSW Men's 2 Finals
7	Blacktown Spartans	26	11	5	10	38	37	+1	38	
8	Central Coast Mariners Academy	26	10	7	9	47	36	+11	37	
9	Western Sydney Wanderers Youth	26	10	6	10	49	40	+9	36	
10	St George	26	7	6	13	37	40	−3	27	
11	St George City	26	8	3	15	31	56	−25	27	
12	Rydalmere Lions (R)	26	6	7	13	27	42	−15	25	Relegation to the 2020 NPL NSW 3 (Note: Relegation based on Club Championship and including points from U20 and U18 teams.)
13	Macarthur Rams (R)	26	4	7	15	18	53	−35	19	Relegation to the 2020 NPL NSW 3
14	Canterbury Bankstown (R)	26	5	2	19	32	72	−40	17	Relegation to the 2020 NPL NSW 3

Source: sportstg.com
Rules for classification: 1) points; 2) goal difference; 3) number of goals scored.
(C) Champions; (P) Promoted; (R) Relegated

==== Finals ====
Elimination finals
4	Mounties Wanderers	2
5	Spirit FC	1
3	Bonnyrigg White Eagles (a.e.t.)	4
6	Northern Tigers	2

Semi-finals
1	North Shore Mariners	5
4	Mounties Wanderers	0
2	Hills United	2
3	Bonnyrigg White Eagles	1

Grand final
1	North Shore Mariners	3
2	Hills United	6

=== 2019 National Premier League NSW Men's 3 ===
NPL NSW Men's 3
- Season: 2019
- Champions: SD Raiders
- Promoted: SD Raiders
- Matches: 154
- Goals: 590 (3.83 per match)
- Top goalscorer: Anthony Proia (24) (SD Raiders)

For the 2019 NPL NSW season 5 teams were relegated due to a change in the competition format for 2020, and the introduction of the new NPL4 division.

==== League Table ====
Pos	Team	Pld	W	D	L	GF	GA	GD	Pts	Qualification or relegation
1	Stanmore Hawks	26	18	6	2	72	27	+45	60	2019 NPL NSW Men's 3 Finals
2	SD Raiders (C, P)	26	18	3	5	70	38	+32	57	Promotion to the 2020 NPL NSW 2 (Note: Promotion based on Club Championship and including points from U20 and U18 teams.)
3	Bankstown City Lions	26	17	3	6	82	47	+35	54	2019 NPL NSW Men's 3 Finals
4	Gladesville Ryde Magic	26	13	6	7	53	46	+7	45	2019 NPL NSW Men's 3 Finals
5	Bankstown United	26	11	8	7	44	40	+4	41	2019 NPL NSW Men's 3 Finals
6	Inter Lions	26	12	4	10	62	48	+14	40	2019 NPL NSW Men's 3 Finals
7	Dunbar Rovers	26	11	5	10	51	40	+11	38	
8	Dulwich Hill	26	10	6	10	54	44	+10	36	
9	Camden Tigers (R)	25	11	3	11	52	45	+7	36	Relegation to 2020 NPL NSW 4 (Note: Relegation based on Club Championship and including points from U20 and U18 teams.)
10	Hawkesbury City (R)	26	7	9	10	35	48	−13	30	Relegation to 2020 NPL NSW 4
11	Sydney University	26	9	1	16	43	59	−16	28	
12	Parramatta FC (R)	25	6	2	17	39	52	−13	20	Relegation to 2020 NPL NSW 4
13	Granville Rage (R)	26	3	6	17	20	72	−52	15	Relegation to 2020 NPL NSW 4
14	Western NSW Mariners (R)	26	3	2	21	32	103	−71	11	Relegation to 2020 NPL NSW 4

Source: sportstg.com
Rules for classification: 1) points; 2) goal difference; 3) number of goals scored.
(C) Champions; (P) Promoted; (R) Relegated

==== Finals ====
Elimination finals
4	Gladesville Ryde Magic (a.e.t.)	3
5	Bankstown United	2
3	Bankstown City	6
6	Inter Lions	5

Semi-finals
1	Stanmore Hawks (a.e.t.)	3
Gladesville Ryde Magic	1
2	SD Raiders	4
Bankstown City	0

Grand final
Stanmore Hawks	1
SD Raiders	3

=== 2019 NSW State League ===
NSW State League
- Season: 2019
- Champions: Fraser Park
- Promoted: Central Coast United

The competition was restructured at the end of the season, with the introduction of the new NPL4 division for 2020.

==== League Table ====
Pos	Team	Pld	W	D	L	GF	GA	GD	Pts	Qualification or relegation
1	Central Coast United (P)	20	15	0	5	62	25	+37	45	Promotion to the 2020 NPL NSW 3 (Note: Promotion based on Club Championship and including points from U20 and U18 teams.)
2	Fraser Park (C)	20	13	3	4	49	29	+20	42	Qualification for the 2019 NSW State League Finals
3	Western Condors	20	9	3	8	44	40	+4	30	Qualification for the 2019 NSW State League Finals; Relegated from Football NSW structure for 2020
4	South Coast Flame FC	20	8	5	7	34	39	−5	29	Qualification for the 2019 NSW State League Finals
5	Hurstville FC	20	8	5	7	21	28	−7	29	Qualification for the 2019 NSW State League Finals
6	Nepean FC	20	8	3	9	43	28	+15	27	
7	Prospect United	20	6	7	7	31	33	−2	25	
8	FC Gazy Auburn	20	6	5	9	25	48	−23	23	Relegated from Football NSW structure for 2020
9	Balmain Tigers	20	6	4	10	34	45	−11	22	Relegated from Football NSW structure for 2020
10	University of NSW	20	6	3	11	44	42	+2	21	
11	Hurstville City Minotaurs	20	5	2	13	30	57	−27	17	Relegated from Football NSW structure for 2020

Source: sportstg.com
Rules for classification: 1) points; 2) goal difference; 3) number of goals scored.
(C) Champions; (P) Promoted

==== Finals ====
Qualifying final
2	Fraser Park	3
3	Western Condors	2
4	South Coast Flame	1
5	Hurstville FC	0

Major semi-final
1	Central Coast United	3
2	Fraser Park	0
Minor semi-final
3	Western Condors	1
4	South Coast Flame	3

Preliminary final
Fraser Park	2
South Coast Flame	0

Grand final
Central Coast United	0
Fraser Park	1

=== 2019 National Premier Leagues NSW Women's 1 ===
National Premier Leagues NSW Women's 1
- Season: 2019
- Champions: Sydney University
- Premiers: Sydney University
- Top goalscorer: Susan Phonsongkham (20) (Sydney Olympic FC)

The 2019 National Premier Leagues NSW Women's 1 was the sixth edition of the NPL NSW Women's competition to be incorporated under the National Premier Leagues banner. 12 teams competed, playing each other twice for a total of 22 rounds.

==== League Table ====
Pos	Team	Pld	W	D	L	GF	GA	GD	Pts	
1	Sydney University (C)	22	16	5	1	55	11	+44	53	2019 NPL NSW Women's Finals
2	Sydney Olympic	22	14	3	5	60	30	+30	45	2019 NPL NSW Women's Finals
3	Northern Tigers	22	13	4	5	40	18	+22	43	2019 NPL NSW Women's Finals
4	Blacktown Spartans	22	13	2	7	43	29	+14	41	2019 NPL NSW Women's Finals
5	Illawarra Stingrays	22	11	7	4	44	24	+20	40	2019 NPL NSW Women's Finals
6	Macarthur Rams	22	11	2	9	52	47	+5	35	
7	North West Sydney Koalas	22	8	8	6	39	32	+7	32	
8	Football NSW Institute	22	7	2	13	32	54	−22	23	
9	Manly United	22	6	3	13	30	41	−11	21	
10	Bankstown City	22	6	3	13	38	60	−22	21	
11	Emerging Jets	22	4	2	16	27	59	−32	14	
12	North Shore Mariners (R)	22	2	1	19	22	77	−55	7	Relegation to the 2020 NPL NSW Women's 2

Source: sportstg.com
Rules for classification: 1) points; 2) goal difference; 3) number of goals scored.
(C) Champions; (R) Relegated

==== Finals ====
Qualifying final
2	Sydney Olympic	0
3	Northern Tigers	1
4	Blacktown Spartans	4
5	Illawarra Stingrays	5

Major semi-final
1	Sydney University	2
3	Northern Tigers	0
Minor semi-final
2	Sydney Olympic	2
5	Illawarra Stingrays	1

Preliminary final
3	Northern Tigers	3
3	Sydney Olympic	0

Grand final
1	Sydney University	1 (4)
3	Northern Tigers	1 (1)

== 2019 Waratah Cup ==
Football NSW soccer clubs competed in 2019 for the Waratah Cup. The tournament doubled as the NSW qualifier for the 2019 FFA Cup, with the top five clubs progressing to the Round of 32. A total of 144 clubs entered the qualifying phase, with the clubs entering in a staggered format.

The Cup was won by Marconi Stallions, their 2nd title.

In addition to the three A-League clubs (Central Coast Mariners, Sydney FC and Western Sydney Wanderers), the five qualifiers (Manly United, Marconi Stallions, Mt Druitt Town Rangers, Sydney United 58 and St George FC) competed in the final rounds of the 2019 FFA Cup.
