= 2026 National Premier Leagues NSW Women's =

National Premier Leagues NSW Women's
- Season: 2026
- Dates: 7 March – 13 September 2026
- Teams: 14
- Champions: Bulls FC Academy
- Runner up: UNSW FC
- Premiers: Bulls FC Academy
- Relegated: Western City Rangers
- Matches: 185
- Goals: 617 (3.34 per match)
- Top goalscorer: Ashlie Letta (30 goals)
- Biggest home win: Western Sydney Wanderers 9–0 Western City Rangers (2 August 2026)
- Biggest away win: NWS Spirit 0–6 Sydney University (2 May 2026); Sydney University 0–6 Bulls FC Academy (10 May 2026)

The 2026 National Premier Leagues NSW Women's was the 13th season of the National Premier Leagues NSW Women's; the top-tier of women's soccer in New South Wales (excluding northern regions of New South Wales). The season began on 7 March 2026 and ended with the grand final on 15 September 2026. Bulls FC Academy won the premiership and championship for the second consecutive season.

== Teams ==
Locations of the 2026 National Premier Leagues NSW Women's teams
Sydney teams

Team	Home city	Home ground
APIA Leichhardt	Sydney (Leichhardt)	Lambert Park
Bulls FC Academy	Sydney (Oran Park)	Northbridge Oval
Gladesville Ravens	Sydney (Gladesville)	Christie Park
Hills United	Sydney (Rouse Hill)	Valentine Sports Park
Illawarra Stingrays	Illawarra	Lakelands Oval
Macarthur Rams	Sydney (St Helens Park)	Lynwood Park
Manly United	Sydney (Dee Why)	Cromer Park
Northern Tigers	Sydney (Pymble)	North Turramurra Recreation Area
NWS Spirit	Sydney (Macquarie Park)	Christie Park
Sydney Olympic	Sydney (Belmore)	The Crest Athletic Centre
Sydney University	Sydney (Camperdown)	Sydney University Football Ground
UNSW FC	Sydney (City of Sydney)	The Village Green
Western City Rangers	Sydney (Emerton)	Popondetta Park
Western Sydney Wanderers	Sydney (Bungarribee)	Wanderers Football Park

=== Head coach changes ===
Team	Outgoing head coach	Manner of departure	Date of vacancy	Replaced by	Date of appointment	Table
Sydney University				Xavier Taylor	18 November 2025	Pre-season
Northern Tigers				Fin Geraghty	18 November 2025	Pre-season

== Regular season ==
=== Standings ===
Pos	Team	Pld	W	D	L	GF	GA	GD	Pts	Qualification or relegation
1	Bulls FC Academy (C)	26	18	7	1	67	24	+43	61	Qualification for Finals series
2	UNSW FC	26	16	9	1	49	20	+29	57	Qualification for Finals series
3	APIA Leichhardt	26	16	4	6	65	36	+29	52	Qualification for Finals series
4	Western Sydney Wanderers	26	15	5	6	55	33	+22	50	Qualification for Finals series
5	Northern Tigers	26	11	6	9	42	35	+7	39	
6	Sydney Olympic	26	11	4	11	46	41	+5	37	
7	Macarthur Rams	26	10	5	11	39	42	−3	35	
8	Manly United	26	8	10	8	41	35	+6	34	
9	Sydney University	26	8	8	10	50	47	+3	32	
10	Hills United	26	8	4	14	33	35	−2	28	
11	Gladesville Ravens	26	7	5	14	34	51	−17	26	
12	NWS Spirit	26	8	2	16	33	79	−46	26	
13	Illawarra Stingrays	26	4	7	15	21	46	−25	19	
14	Western City Rangers (R)	26	3	2	21	28	79	−51	11	Relegation to Football NSW League One Women's

Source: Football NSW
Rules for classification: 1) Points; 2) Goal difference; 3) Goals scored; 4) If the teams cannot be determined by rules 1 to 3, rules 4.1 to 4.3 are applied – 4.1) Points gained in head-to-head record between such teams; 4.2) Goals scored in head-to-head record between such teams; 4.3) Play-offs
(C) Champions; (R) Relegated

=== Results ===
Home \ Away	API	BUL	GLA	HIL	ILL	MAC	MAN	NOR	NWS	SYO	SYU	UNS	WCR	WSW
APIA Leichhardt	—	2–2	4–2	2–0	5–1	2–1	4–1	1–4	2–1	2–0	2–1	1–1	5–1	4–2
Bulls FC Academy	3–2	—	1–1	2–1	4–1	2–1	2–2	2–0	4–4	4–0	1–1	1–0	4–0	1–1
Gladesville Ravens	3–2	0–3	—	0–4	0–0	0–5	2–1	1–0	3–0	1–5	1–4	2–2	6–0	0–0
Hills United	1–4	1–1	1–0	—	1–2	1–3	1–2	1–2	5–0	1–0	1–3	0–2	3–0	1–2
Illawarra Stingrays	1–1	0–2	3–0	0–0	—	0–1	0–1	0–3	1–1	0–1	0–0	1–3	1–1	0–1
Macarthur Rams	1–2	0–5	2–3	1–0	2–1	—	1–1	3–2	4–0	0–3	2–2	0–1	3–2	1–0
Manly United	1–2	0–1	1–0	2–0	3–0	1–1	—	1–1	3–1	2–2	1–1	1–2	4–0	1–2
Northern Tigers	2–1	0–2	1–0	1–1	0–2	1–1	1–1	—	7–1	3–1	2–3	0–0	3–1	0–2
NWS Spirit	0–4	0–5	3–1	1–0	0–2	4–2	3–1	2–1	—	1–6	0–6	3–8	4–0	0–2
Sydney Olympic	2–1	0–1	2–0	1–2	2–2	4–1	0–3	1–2	0–1	—	4–1	1–5	3–1	0–2
Sydney University	0–3	0–6	1–1	0–3	6–2	3–1	2–2	2–2	1–2	2–3	—	1–2	5–2	3–0
UNSW FC	1–1	4–0	1–0	1–1	1–0	1–0	2–2	4–1	1–0	0–0	1–1	—	2–1	2–2
Western City Rangers	1–4	0–3	1–4	0–1	6–1	1–2	1–1	0–1	5–1	1–3	2–1	0–1	—	1–4
Western Sydney Wanderers	3–2	3–5	4–3	3–2	1–0	0–0	3–2	1–2	5–0	2–2	1–0	0–1	9–0	—

Source: Football NSW
Legend: Blue = home team win; Yellow = draw; Red = away team win.

== Finals series ==
=== Semi-finals ===
5 September 2026
17:00 AEST

UNSW FC	3–1	APIA Leichhardt
Koulizakis 19', 48'; Karrys-Stahl 86'	Report	Lancaster 59'

The Village Green (Synthetic), Sydney
6 September 2026
15:00 AEST

Bulls FC Academy	6–2	Western Sydney Wanderers
Phillips 14'; Valletta 20'; Naeimi 40'; Hunter 45+1'; dos Santos 68'; Guichon 90+2'	Report	Khoshaba 13'; McKenzie 70'

Northbridge Oval (Synthetic), Sydney

=== Grand final ===
13 September 2026
12:00 AEST

Bulls FC Academy	1–1 (a.e.t.)	UNSW FC
Hunter 105'	Report	Koulizakis 120'
Penalties
Hunter (penalty scored); Phillips (penalty scored); Ferris (penalty scored); Vanderlaan (penalty scored)	4–2	(penalty missed) Yamahata; (penalty scored) Channing; (penalty scored) Koulizakis; (penalty missed) Naccari

Jubilee Stadium, Sydney

== Top goalscorers ==
Pos	Player	Team	Goals
1	Ashlie Letta	APIA Leichhardt	30
2	Allyssa Ng Saad	Western Sydney Wanderers	13
3	Leena Khamis	Gladesville Ravens	12
3	Amber Luchtmeijer	Bulls FC Academy	12
3	Chloe Smith	UNSW FC	12
3	Morgan Witz	Sydney Olympic	12
7	Talia Kapetanellis	APIA Leichhardt	11
7	Marcella Santos	Macarthur Rams	11
7	Olivia Vanderlaan	Bulls FC Academy	11
10	Tanaye Morris	Northern Tigers	10
10	Giuliana Nicholas	Sydney Olympic	10
10	Asha Sutton	Sydney University	10
10	Poppy Tay	Sydney University	10

== See also ==
- 2026 National Premier Leagues NSW Men's
