= Mya Callil =

Footballer (born 2006)

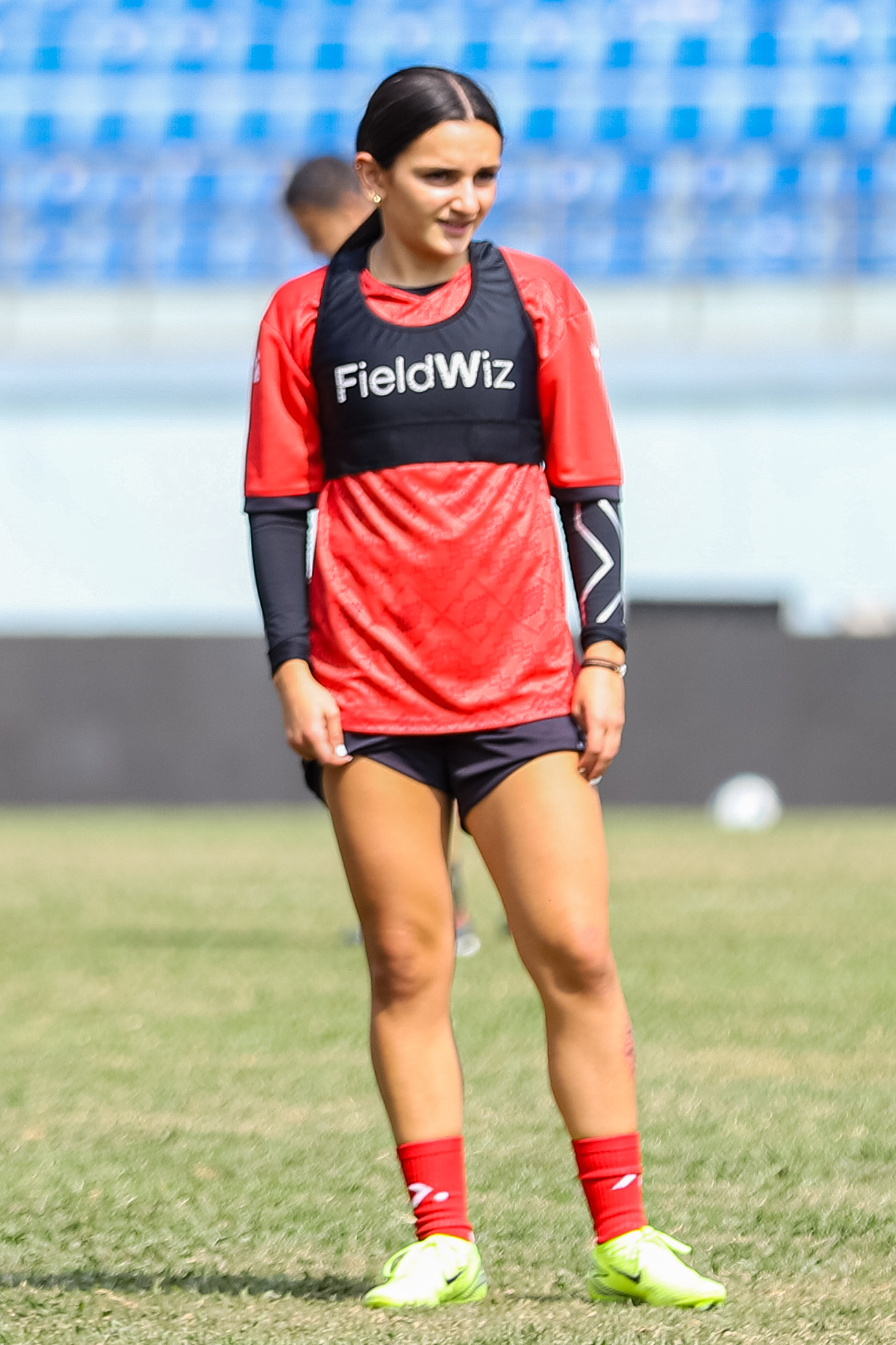
- Callil with Lebanon in 2025

Personal information
- Full name: Mya Rose Wade Christopher Mhanna
- Date of birth: 16 November 2006 (age 19)
- Place of birth: Campsie, New South Wales, Australia
- Position: Midfielder

Team information
- Current team: Schalke 04

Youth career
- 2019–2020: APIA Leichhardt
- 2021: St George FC
- 2021–2022: Sydney Olympic
- 2023: Bulls FC Academy

Senior career*
Years	Team	Apps	(Gls)
2024–2025	Bulls FC Academy	20	(0)
2025–2026	Western Sydney Wanderers NPL	15	(1)
2026–	Schalke 04	0	(0)

International career^{‡}
2025	Lebanon U20		
2025–	Lebanon	14	(1)
- * Club domestic league appearances and goals as of 5 July 2026 ‡ National team caps and goals as of 13 October 2026

Mya Rose Wade Christopher Mhanna (Arabic: مايا روز ويد كريستوفر مهنّا; born 16 November 2006), commonly known as Mya Callil, (Note: Known in her club career as Mya Callil (Arabic: مايا خليل), she plays as Mya Mhanna (Arabic: مايا مهنا) at the national-team level.) is a footballer who plays as a midfielder for German club Schalke 04. Born in Australia, she plays for the Lebanon national team.

== Club career ==
Callil began her youth career at APIA Leichhardt. In 2021, she moved to St George FC, before joining Sydney Olympic and then the Bulls FC Academy in 2023.

She was awarded top scorer of the 2024 NSW Futsal Premier League 2 U18 Women's with Sydney Futsal Club, earning her the honor of Player of the Year.

Callil won the 2025 NPL NSW Premiership with Bulls FC Academy following a 2–1 victory over APIA Leichhardt on 31 August 2025. Two weeks later, she helped the club secure the 2025 NPL NSW Championship, again defeating APIA Leichhardt, this time 4–3 in the grand final on 13 September. Callil joined Western Sydney Wanderers's NPL NSW team ahead of the 2026 season.

On 14 July 2026, Callil joined the Future Team of German club Schalke 04. As part of the Future Team, she trained regularly with Schalke's first team in the third-tier Regionalliga, while gaining match experience with the reserve team in the fifth-tier Landesliga.

== International career ==
Callil was first called up to the Lebanon national team in February 2025, ahead of the 2025 International Women's Championship in Nepal. After having made her international debut against Myanmar in a 3–1 defeat on 17 February, Callil scored her first goal for Lebanon on 23 February, helping her side beat Kyrgyzstan 2–0.

== Personal life ==
Callil attended Endeavour Sports High School in Sydney, New South Wales.

== Career statistics ==
=== Club ===
As of match played 5 July 2026

Appearances and goals by club, season and competition
Club	Season	League			Other		Total	
Club	Season	Division	Apps	Goals	Apps	Goals	Apps	Goals
Bulls FC Academy	2024	NPL NSW	8	0	—		8	0
Bulls FC Academy	2025	NPL NSW	12	0	—		12	0
Bulls FC Academy	Total		20	0	0	0	20	0
Western Sydney Wanderers NPL	2026	NPL NSW	15	1	3 (Note: Appearances in Sapphire Cup)	0	18	1
Career total			35	1	3	0	38	1

=== International ===
Scores and results list Lebanon's goal tally first, score column indicates score after each Callil goal.

List of international goals scored by Mya Callil
No.	Date	Venue	Opponent	Score	Result	Competition
1	23 February 2025	Dasharath Rangasala, Kathmandu, Nepal	Kyrgyzstan	2–0	2–0	2025 Vianet Championship

== Honours ==
Bulls FC Academy

- NPL NSW Women's Championship: 2025
- NPL NSW Women's Premiership: 2025

== See also ==
- List of Lebanon women's international footballers
