= Football NSW League Men's =

- Founded: 2022; 4 years ago 1957 (as NSW Division 2 (Div One)); 1959 (as NSW Division 3 (Div Two))
- Country: Australia
- State: New South Wales
- Confederation: AFC
- Number of clubs: 31: Division One: 16; Division Two: 15
- Level on pyramid: 4 and 5 (notionally)
- Promotion to: National Premier Leagues NSW
- Domestic cup(s): National; Australia Cup; State; Waratah Cup
- Current champions: Blacktown Spartans FC (League One) (2026); Mounties Wanderers FC (League Two) (2026)

The Football NSW League is an Australian soccer league based in New South Wales that was founded in 2022 and administered by Football NSW. It consists of two divisions that were named after the Football NSW League's breakaway of the National Premier Leagues NSW second and third divisions (and formerly fourth division) that ran in the NPL NSW system from 2013 to 2021.

== History ==
In August 2021, Football NSW renamed the National Premier Leagues NSW (NPL NSW) second, third and fourth divisions to form the Football NSW League with the NPL 2 becoming League One, NPL 3 becoming League Two and NPL 4 becoming League Three. St George City were the inaugural champions of the FNSW League.

== Format ==
The Football NSW League first and second divisions are contested by 15 to 16 teams each. Each team plays home and away against teams against all other teams in the league for a total of 30 fixtures each season. The top finishing clubs gain automatic promotion to the higher tier level, while those clubs finishing in second place, will play in a home-and-away play-off for promotion. The top finishing club in the first division will be automatically relegated to the second division, while those clubs finishing in second place, will play in a home-and-away play-off to avoid relegation.

== Current members ==
These are the clubs who will take part in the 2026 Football NSW League.

=== Division One ===
| Club | Location | Grounds | Capacity | Founded | Notes |
|---|---|---|---|---|---|
| Bankstown City FC | Bankstown | Jensen Park | 8,000 | 1975 | |
| Blacktown Spartans FC | Rooty Hill | Blacktown International Sportspark; Blacktown Football Park | 10,000; 3,000 | 2002 | |
| Bulls FC Academy | Edensor Park | Sydney United Sports Centre | 12,000 | | Relegated from the NPL in the 2023 season |
| Canterbury Bankstown FC | Bass Hill; Bankstown | The Crest Athletic Centre; Jensen Park | 10,000; 8,000 | 1886 | |
| Central Coast Mariners Academy | Lisarow | Pluim Park | 2,000 | 2012 | Relegated from the NPL in the 2025 season |
| Dulwich Hill FC | Dulwich Hill | Arlington Oval | | 1968 | |
| Hakoah Sydney City East | Eastgardens | Hensley Athletic Field | 1,000 | 1939 | Relegated from the NPL in the 2019 season |
| Hills United FC | Rouse Hill | Valentine Sports Park; Landen Stadium | 1,000; 7,000 | 1989 | Relegated from the NPL after the 2024 season |
| Hurstville ZFC | Hurstville | Penshurst Park | | 1970 | Promoted from the NSW League Two after the 2025 season |
| Inter Lions SC | Concord | Majors Bay Reserve | | 1983 | |
| Macarthur Rams FC | St Helens Park | Lynwood Park | 3,000 | 1968 | |
| Mounties Wanderers FC | Mount Pritchard | Mount Pritchard Oval; Wanderers Football Park | | 1978 | |
| Newcastle Jets Youth | Speers Point | Lake Macquarie Regional Football Facility | | 2008 | Promoted from the NSW League Two after the 2024 season |
| Northern Tigers FC | Hornsby | North Turramurra Recreation Area | | 2016 | |
| Rydalmere Lions | Rydalmere | Rydalmere Park | | 1979 | |
| Western City Rangers FC | Mount Druitt | Popondetta Park | 1,000 | 1970 | |
Source: Football NSW

=== Division Two ===
| Club | Location | Ground |
|---|---|---|
| Bankstown United | Padstow | Padstow Park |
| Bonnyrigg White Eagles | Bonnyrigg | Bonnyrigg Sports Club |
| Camden Tigers | Camden | Ron Dine Reserve |
| Central Coast United FC | Lisarow | Pluim Park |
| Dunbar Rovers | Eastgardens | Rockdale Ilinden Sport Centre |
| Fraser Park | Marrickville | Fraser Park |
| Gladesville Ryde Magic | North Ryde | Christie Park (Sydney, Australia) |
| Granville Rage | Granville | Rydalmere Park |
| Hawkesbury City | Richmond | David Bertenshaw Field |
| Inner West Hawks FC | Stanmore | Arlington Oval |
| Nepean FC | St Marys | Cook Park |
| Parramatta FC | South Granville | Melita Stadium |
| Prospect United | Prospect | Blacktown international Sport Park |
| Sydney Uni SFC | Camperdown | Sydney Uni Football Ground |
| South Coast Flame | Illawarra | Sir Ian McLennan Park |
Source: Football NSW

== NSW Leagues Honours ==
=== 2022 ===
When the Football NSW League was first established, three divisions were played.

Champions
| Season | Division One | Division Two | Division Three |
|---|---|---|---|
| 2022 | St George City | Macarthur Rams | Newcastle Jets Youth |

Premiers
| Season | Division One | Division Two | Division Three |
|---|---|---|---|
| 2022 | Central Coast Mariners Academy | Inter Lions | Newcastle Jets Youth |

=== 2023–present ===
From 2023 onwards, Division Three folded.

| Season | Division One | Division Two |
|---|---|---|
| 2023 | Hills United | UNSW FC |
| 2024 | Mt Druitt Town Rangers | Newcastle Jets Youth |
| 2025 | UNSW FC | Hurstville ZFC |
| 2026 | Blacktown Spartans FC | Mounties Wanderers FC |

== Honours (1957–2021) ==
=== Divivion One ===
| Season | Competition Name | Regular season | | Finals series | | |
| Season | Competition Name | Premiers (number of titles) | League Runners-Up | Champions | Score | Finalists |
|---|---|---|---|---|---|---|
| 1957 | Division Two | Villawood | – | Villawood | 3–2 | Camperdown |
| 1958 | Division Two | Budapest (East) (Note: The season was divided into two conferences, East and West. The two premiers played out in the grand final for the title. As Budapest were champions, they were crowned premiers and Pan-Hellenic runners-up.) | Pan-Hellenic (West) | Budapest | 4–0 | Pan-Hellenic |
| 1959 | Division Two | Neerlandia (Manly Warringah) | Pan-Hellenic (2) | Unknown if Finals series was held | | |
| 1960 | Division Two | Pan-Hellenic | Polonia | Polonia | 2–1 | Pan-Hellenic (2) |
| 1961 | Division Two | SSC Yugal | Granville AEK | Balgownie Rangers | 3–1 | Granville AEK |
| 1962 | Division Two | Croatia | Balgownie Rangers | Corinthian BESC | 3–1 | Croatia |
| 1963 | Division Two | Corinthian BESC | Polonia North Side | Polonia North Side | 1–0 | Corinthian BESC |
| 1964 | Division Two | Polonia North Side | Granville AEK (2) | Polonia North Side (2) | 2–1 | Wollongong Olympic |
| 1965 | Division Two | Corinthian BESC (2) | Granville AEK (3) | Corinthian BESC (2) | 4–1 | Granville AEK (2) |
| 1966 | Division Two | Polonia North Side (2) | Canterbury-Marrickville | Polonia North Side (3) | 4–3 (a.e.t.) | Canterbury-Marrickville |
| 1967 | Division Two | Manly Warringah (2) | Granville AEK (4) | Bankstown | 1–0 | Sutherland Shire |
| 1968 | Division Two | Auburn | Western Suburbs | Auburn | 3–0 | Western Suburbs |
| 1969 | Division Two | Marconi Fairfield | Bankstown | Bankstown | 3–2 | Western Suburbs (2) |
| 1970 | Division Two | Western Suburbs | Sutherland Shire | No Finals series held | | |
| 1971 | Division Two | Sutherland Shire | Granville AEK (5) | Sutherland Shire | – | Unknown |
| 1972 | Division Two | Granville AEK | Canterbury-Marrickville (2) | Grand final results unknown | | |
| 1973 | Division Two | Canterbury-Marrickville | Balgownie Rangers (2) | Grand final results unknown | | |
| 1974 | Division Two | Granville Parramatta (2) | Balgownie Rangers (3) | Manly Warringah | 1–0 | Balgownie Rangers |
| 1975 | Division Two | Manly Warringah (3) | Arncliffe Scots | Bankstown | 2–1 | Arncliffe Scots |
| 1976 | Division Two | Riverside Avala | Yugal Prague | Grand final results unknown | | |
| 1977 | Division Two | Melita Eagles | Toongabbie | Revesby Workers | – | Ku-Ring-Gai |
| 1978 | Division Two | Ku-Ring-Gai | Revesby Workers | Polonia North Side | 3–0 | Ku-Ring-Gai (2) |
| 1979 | NSW Division One | St George-Budapest (2) | North Sydney Inter | Grand final results unknown | | |
| 1980 | NSW Division One | Marconi Fairfield | Polonia | Grand final results unknown | | |
| 1981 | NSW Division One | SSC Yugal (2) | Ku-Ring-Gai | Grand final results unknown | | |
| 1982 | NSW Division One | Ku-Ring-Gai (2) | Blacktown United | Fairy Meadow | 2–0 | Blacktown United |
| 1983 | NSW Division Two | Rockdale Ilinden | Warringah Narrabeen | Warringah Narrabeeen | 3–2 (a.e.t.) | Gladesville Ravens |
| 1984 | NSW Division Two | Fairy Meadow | Wollongong Macedonia | Grand final results unknown | | |
| 1985 | NSW Division Two | Wollongong Macedonia | Gladesville-Hornsby | Gladesville-Hornsby | 2–1 | Queens Park |
| 1986 | NSW Division Two | SSC Yugal (3) | Gladesville-Hornsby (2) | Gladesville-Hornsby (2) | 1–0 | North Bankstown |
| 1987 | NSW Division Two | Polonia (3) | Fairy Meadow | Kingsford Hellenic | 2–1 | Polonia |
| 1988 | NSW Division Two | Avala (2) | Fairy Meadow (2) | Avala | 4–2 | Sydney Macedonia |
| 1989 | NSW Division Two | Sydney Macedonia | North Shore United | Grand final results unknown | | |
| 1990 | NSW Division Two | Southern Districts | Dulwich Hill | Grand final results unknown | | |
| 1991 | NSW Division Two | Waverley | Dulwich Hill (2) | Dulwich Hill | 4–0 | Waverley |
| 1992 | Stage League Division One | Cyprus United | Auburn United | Cyprus United | 3–1 | Central Coast |
| 1993 | Stage League Division One | Mt Druitt Town Rangers | Auburn United (2) | Grand final results unknown | | |
| 1994 | Stage League Division One | Macarthur Rams | Wollongong United (2) | Macarthur Rams | 1–0 | Wollongong United |
| 1995 | Stage League Division One | Belmore Hercules | Central Coast | Grand final results unknown | | |
| 1996 | Stage League Division One | Sydney Cosmos | Belmore Hercules | Grand final results unknown | | |
| 1997 | Stage League Division One | Hurstville City Minotaurs | Ryde City | Stanmore Hawks | 1–0 | Eastern Suburbs |
| 1998 | Stage League Division One | Fairfield Bulls | Hurstville City Minotaurs | Grand final results unknown | | |
| 1999 | Stage League Division One | St George Saints (3) | | Penrith Panthers | – | Manly Warringah Dolphins |
| 2000 | Stage League Division One | Dulwich Hill | Hajduk Wanderers | Dulwich Hill | – | Hajduk Wanderers |
| 2001 | NSW Super League | Bankstown City (2) | Fairfield Bulls | Manly Warringah Dolphins | 1–0 | Bankstown City |
| 2002 | NSW Super League | Rockdale City Suns (2) | Manly Warringah Dolphins | Rockdale City Suns | 1–0 | Hajduk Wanderers |
| 2003 | NSW Super League | Sydney Crescent Stars | Fraser Park Dragons | Sydney Crescent Stars | 3–2 | Fraser Park Dragons |
| 2004 | NSW Super League | Manly Warringah Dolphins | Stanmore Hawks | Stanmore Hawks | 2–1 | Manly Warringah |
| 2005 | NSW Super League | FC Bossy Liverpool | Canterbury Marrickville Olympic | Canterbury Marrickville Olympic | 1–0 | FC Bossy Liverpool |
| 2006 | NSW Super League | Rockdale City Suns (3) | Penrith Nepean United | Rockdale City Suns | 1–0 | Penrith Nepean United |
| 2007 | NSW Super League | Northern Tigers FC | Bonnyrigg White Eagles | Bonnyrigg White Eagles | 2–0 | Northern Tigers FC |
| 2008 | NSW Super League | Bonnyrigg White Eagles | PCYC Parramatta | Liverpool Bossy | 2–1 | PCYC Parramatta |
| 2009 | NSW Super League | Rockdale City Suns (4) | PCYC Parramatta | Spirit FC | 1–1 (8–7 (p)) | PCYC Parramatta |
| 2010 | NSW Super League | Parramatta Eagles | Northern Tigers FC | Northern Tigers FC | 4–0 | St George FC |
| 2011 | NSW Super League | Blacktown Spartans | West Sydney Berries | Blacktown Spartans | 3–0 | West Sydney Berries |
| 2012 | NSW Super League | Northern Tigers FC | Bankstown City | Northern Tigers FC | 1–1 (4–3 (p)) | Bankstown Berries |
| 2013 | NPL NSW Men's 2 | St George FC (4) | Macarthur Rams | St George FC | 3–1 | Mounties Wanderers |
| 2014 | NPL NSW Men's 2 | Parramatta FC | Central Coast Mariners Academy | Macarthur Rams | 2–1 | Parramatta FC |
| 2015 | NPL NSW Men's 2 | Spirit FC | Hakoah Sydney City East FC | Northern Tigers FC | 2–1 | Bankstown City |
| 2016 | NPL NSW Men's 2 | Sydney FC Youth | Western Sydney Wanderers Youth | Sydney FC Youth | 4–1 | Western Sydney Wanderers Youth |
| 2017 | NPL NSW Men's 2 | Marconi Stallions (3) | St George | Marconi Stallions | 5–1 | Mt Druitt Town |
| 2018 | NPL NSW Men's 2 | Mt Druitt Town | St George | St George | 3–3 (5–4 (p)) | Mounties Wanderers FC |
| 2019 | NPL NSW Men's 2 | North Shore Mariners | Hills United | Hills United | 6–3 | North Shore Mariners |
| 2020 | NPL NSW Men's 2 | Central Coast Mariners Academy (2) | North West Sydney Spirit | Central Coast Mariners Academy | 6–2 | Northern Tigers |
| 2021 | NPL NSW Men's 2 | Cancelled due to the COVID-19 pandemic in Australia. | | | | |

Source: SoccerAust

=== Division Two ===
| Season | Competition Name | Regular season | | Grand Finals | | |
| Season | Competition Name | Premiers (number of titles) | Runners-up | Champions (number of titles) | Score | Finalists |
|---|---|---|---|---|---|---|
| 1959 | Division Three | Toongabbie | | | – | |
| 1960 | Division Three | Croatia Sydney | | | – | |
| 1961 | Division Three | Melita Eagles | Juventus | | – | |
| 1962 | Division Three | Cabramatta | Sydney University | | – | |
Disbanded to Amateur Leagues/Inter suburban leagues (1963–1970)
| 1971 | Division Three | Bankstown City | Belmore | Belmore | 2–1 | Northern Districts |
| 1972 | Division Three | Rosebery Rhodes | Enmore | Belmore | ? Replay: 2–1 (a.e.t.) | Enmore |
| 1973 | Division Three | Riverside Rapid | Marrickville-Rockdale | Marrickville-Rockdale | 3–0 | Ku-Ring-Gai |
| 1974 | Division Three | Northern Districts | Arncliffe Scots | Ku-Ring-Gai | 0–0 (a.e.t.); Replay: 2–1 | Arncliffe Scots |
| 1975 | Division Three | Toongabbie (2) | Ku-Ring-Gai | Toongabbie | 2–1 | Queens Park |
| 1976 | Division Three | Ku-Ring-Gai | Queens Park | Ku-Ring-Gai | 2–0 | Queens Park |
| 1977 | Division Three | Blacktown United | University of NSW | Nepean Corinthian | 2–1 | University of NSW |
| 1978 | Division Three | Nepean Corinthian | Bathurst '75 | Nepean Corinthian (2) | 3–0 | Lethbridge Rangers |
| 1979 | Division Two | Bathurst '75 | Gladesville Ravens | Bathurst '75 | 2–1 | Gladesville Ravens |
| 1980 | Division Two | Guildford County | Gladesville Ravens | Gladesville Ravens | 2–0 | North Bankstown |
| 1981 | Division Two | Dee Why Swans | Marrickville Rockdale | Dee Why Swans | 1–1 (6–4 (p)) | Mt Druitt Town Rangers |
| 1982 | Division Two | Artarmon | Campbelltown City | Artarmon | 2–1 | Campbelltown City |
| 1983 | Division Three | Bathurst '75 (2) | Queens Park-Eastern Suburbs | Campbelltown City | 1–1 (3–2 (p)) | Queens Park-Eastern Suburbs |
| 1984 | Division Three | Campbelltown City | Queens Park-Eastern Suburbs | Campbelltown City (2) | 1–0 | Queens Park-Eastern Suburbs |
| 1985 | Division Three | Kingsford Hellenic | Bondi Marine | | – | |
| 1986 | Division Three | Granville Chile | Rooty Hill | | – | |
| 1987 | Division Three | Granville Chile (2) | West United | University of New South Wales | 4–3 (a.e.t.) | West United |
| 1988 | Division Three | Dulwich Hill | Moorebank Sports | Dulwich Hill | 1–0 | Moorebank Sports |
| 1989 | Division Three | Rosebery Portugal | Central Coast | | – | |
| 1990 | Division Three | Port Hacking-GreenIsland | Mount Pritchard | | – | |
| 1991 | Division Three | Lemnos Allstars | West Wanderers | | – | |
| 1992 | Division Two | Belmore Hercules | Bathurst '75 | Bathurst '75 | 2–0 | North Ryde |
| 1993 | Division Two | North Ryde | Southern Minotaurs | North Ryde | 1–0 | Southern Minotaurs |
| 1994 | Division Two | Southern Minotaurs | Hills United | | – | |
| 1995 | Division Two | Penrith Panthers | Bankstown Sports | Bankstown Sports | – | Penrith Panthers |
| 1996 | Division Two | Greystanes | Sydney Districts | | – | |
| 1997 | Division Two | AC United | Moorebank Sports | AC United | 1–0 | University of New South Wales |
| 1998 | Division Two | Hajduk Wanderers | Dulwich Hills | | – | |
| 1999 | Division Two | Fraser Park Dragons (2) | Hajduk Wanderers | Hajduk Wanderers | – | Sydney University |
| 2000 | Division Two | Greystanes (2) | Hurstville ZFC | Hurstville ZFC | – | Hills United |
| 2001 | NSW State League 1 | Sydney University | Illawarra Lions | Sydney University | 2–1 | Ryde City |
| 2002 | NSW State League 1 | Wanderers Cedars | Western Rage | Mount Pritchard | 1–0 | Wanderers Cedars |
| 2003 | NSW State League 1 | Northern Tigers FC | Hurstville ZFC | Mount Pritchard (2) | 2–0 | Northern Tigers FC |
| 2004 | NSW State League 1 | Nepean Association | Western Rage | Nepean Association | 1–0 | Western Rage |
| 2005 | NSW State League 1 | Fairfield City Lions | Inter Lions | Fairfield City Lions | 4–0 | Mt Druitt Town Rangers |
| 2006 | NSW State League 1 | Mt Druitt Town Rangers | Mount Pritchard | Schofield Scorpions | 2–0 | Mt Druitt Town Rangers |
| 2007 | NSW State League 1 | Canterbury Bankstown Berries | Spirit FC | Spirit FC | 2–2 (4–2 (p)) | Canterbury Bankstown Berries |
| 2008 | NSW State League 1 | Spirit FC | Inter Lions | Spirit FC | 1–1 (2–1 (p)) | Dulwich Hill |
| 2009 | NSW State League 1 | Dulwich Hill (2) | Mounties FC | Mounties FC (3) | 2–0 | Dulwich Hill |
| 2010 | NSW State League 1 | Hills Brumbies | Blacktown Spartans | Fairfield City Lions (2) | 3–2 | Hills Brumbies |
| 2011 | NSW State League 1 | Mounties Wanderers | Fairfield City Lions | Mounties Wanderers (4) | 3–0 | Gladesville Ryde Magic |
| 2012 | NSW State League 1 | Gladesville Ryde Magic | Mt Druitt Town Rangers | Gladesville Ryde Magic | 2–0 | Mt Druitt Town Rangers |
| 2013 | NSW State League 1 | Northbridge FC | Dulwich Hill | Balmain Tigers FC | 2–0 (a.e.t.) | Northbridge FC |
| 2014 | NSW State League 1 | Hakoah Sydney City East | Northbridge FC | Hakoah Sydney City East | 3–2 (a.e.t.) | Northbridge FC |
| 2015 | NSW State League 1 | North Shore Mariners (2) | Rydalmere Lions | North Shore Mariners | 3–2 | Hills Brumbies |
| 2016 | NPL NSW Men's 3 | Hills Brumbies (2) | Rydalmere Lions | Rydalmere Lions | 4–1 | Hills Brumbies |
| 2017 | NPL NSW Men's 3 | Rydalmere Lions | Fraser Park FC | Fraser Park FC | 2–1 (a.e.t.) | Rydalmere Lions |
| 2018 | NPL NSW Men's 3 | St George City | Hawkesbury City | St George City | 2–0 | SD Raiders |
| 2019 | NPL NSW Men's 3 | Stanmore Hawks | SD Raiders | SD Raiders | 3–1 | Stanmore Hawks |
| 2020 | NPL NSW Men's 3 | Rydalmere Lions (2) | Bankstown City Lions | Rydalmere Lions | 1–0 | Bankstown City Lions |
| 2021 | NPL NSW Men's 3 | Cancelled due to the COVID-19 pandemic in Australia. | | | | |

Source: Socceraust

== See also ==
- National Premier Leagues NSW
