= Macarthur Rams FC =

Macarthur Rams
- Full name: Macarthur Rams Football Club
- Nickname: Rams
- Founded: 1968; 58 years ago (as Campbelltown City)
- Ground: Lynwood Park
- Capacity: 3,000 (550 seated)
- Chairman: Paul Bertolissio
- Manager: Daniel Mijovic (Men's); Victoria Guzman (Women's)
- League: NSW League One, NPL NSW Women's
- 2026: 6th of 16, 2nd of 14
- Website: www.macarthurrams.com.au
Home colours	Away colours

Macarthur Rams Football Club is a semi-professional soccer club based in Campbelltown, New South Wales, Australia. The club compete in Football NSW League One, situated in the third tier of Australian football. The club's home ground is the 3,000 capacity Lynwood Park, located in St. Helens Park. Founded by an amalgamation of Campbelltown City Soccer Club and modern-day Gunners Soccer Club, the 'Rams' serve as the premier football club within the Macarthur region, and operate as Macarthur's highest-ranked club outside of the A-League Men competition. The Rams have a corresponding women's team, which competes in National Premier Leagues NSW.

== History ==
=== Foundations as Campbelltown City (1968–1971) ===
The origins of Macarthur Rams are traced back to the earliest records of Campbelltown City Soccer Club, which is the 'NSW Inter Suburban Division Four' 1968 season in which they won the premiership; ahead of 'Liverpool Eagles' on goal difference. This was the beginning of a triple promotion, which saw them compete in the NSW Federation Division Three in 1971; positioned on the third tier of the Australian football league system.

=== Campbelltown City SC history (1972–1987) ===
Campbelltown City SC remained in the NSW Federation Division Three for a further six years, often fluctuating through the mid-table until their relegation in 1977, the same year the league's name changed to 'NSW State League Division Three'. Following the relegation, they competed in the NSW State League Division Four, in which it only took them two years to get promoted again. Their two-year stint included one grand final appearance in 1978; a 2–1 loss to Sydney University.

For the next four years, Campbelltown City competed in the 'Division Two' competition, which following a renaming of the state leagues was the third tier of football in NSW. This was reverted in 1983, which saw the leagues return to the traditional naming structure. From 1982 to 1984, Campbelltown City competed in three grand finals, winning the latter two against Queens Park Eastern Suburbs both years. The 1984 season also saw them win the premiership, confusingly promoting them back to the 'Division Two' competition from 'Division Three'. This put them at the third tier of the Australian football league system, the highest in the club's history.

Campbelltown City maintained Division Two football for the next three years, ending with a second-last placed finish to end their nineteen-year history as Campbelltown City.

=== Campbelltown District SC history (1976–1987) ===
In July 1976, a group of residents from Macquarie Fields and Glenfield held a meeting to gage whether there was enough interest to establish a football club in the local area. Some of these residents had children playing for local club Ingleburn Eagles and decided that they should have a club to represent their own area, as the Macquarie Fields and Glenfield areas were growing rapidly with the developing housing estates in the mid-1970s. A unanimous vote of approximately forty residents was carried to form the 'Glenquarie United Soccer Club' with the logo of "The Gunners" based on English football club Arsenal. The name 'Glenquarie' was a combination of the two respective suburbs' names. The club's teams were to compete in the Southern Districts Soccer Association Leagues and to play their home games behind James Meehan High School, Macquarie Fields.

After successful seasons in the Southern Districts competition, Glenquarie United began competing in the NSW football league system. In their first season, they won the NSW Division Six competition, the beginning of a double promotion. In 1983, Glenquarie United renamed themselves to 'Campbelltown District Soccer Club'.

The Campbelltown District era saw another successful double promotion, placing them in the NSW Division Three competition, placing them at the fourth tier of the Australian football league system, the highest in the club's history. In 1986, Campbelltown District competed in NSW Division Three as 'Campbelltown Gunners', in reference to their Arsenal-orientated branding. After a mid-table finish, the club again reverted to 'Campbelltown District' for 1987, a season in which they would finish 5th; marking the end of Campbelltown District's eleven-year history competing as themselves in the NSW football league system.

=== Amalgamation and Macarthur Rams formation (1987–1988) ===
In 1987, Campbelltown City SC and Campbelltown District SC joined the Macarthur Districts Soccer Football Association (now Macarthur Football Association), the governing body of football in Macarthur, forming Campbelltown City and Districts Soccer Club, opening the possibility for negotiations between the federation club of the area and the MDSFA. Their men's teams remained competing in the NSW football league system.

In 1988, the NSW Soccer Federation looked to consolidate teams across the three State League Divisions from each area/district. As a result, Campbelltown City and Campbelltown District amalgamated to form Campbelltown Vikings. The Vikings were to play their home games at Bensley Road Soccer Complex, which would eventually become the home ground of the Campbelltown District SC, who still had their youth and women's teams under the MDSFA, despite the men's team's amalgamation. Campbelltown District are now known as Gunners Soccer Club and compete in the MFA-run M-League, which is positioned at the sixth tier of the Australian football league system. Campbelltown City did not remain as a separate club, and instead completely amalgamated.

=== Campbelltown Vikings era (1988–1990) ===
In 1988, the Campbelltown Vikings began to competing in the NSW Division Two at the third tier of the Australian football league system. The Vikings would go on to spend seven years in the NSW Division Two, during which the leagues once again changed its name to NSW Division One.

During 1991, the Campbelltown Vikings approached the MDSFA to discuss the transfer of their federation team to the control of the association. Upon reaching agreement, the association approached the NSW Soccer Federation to ratify the agreement. For the 1991 season, the Campbelltown Vikings were renamed to the 'Campbelltown Rams'.

=== Beginning of the Rams and First Division Years (1991–2000) ===
Under the nickname 'Rams', which remains in use, Campbelltown Rams spent the 1991 and 1992 NSW Division One 1992 seasons in mid-table, solidifying themselves as a Division One team, often coming close to qualifying for a play-off position.

For the 1993 NSW Division One season, Campbelltown Rams renamed themselves to 'Macarthur Rams', a name they would keep to the present day.

In 1994, Macarthur Rams won the NSW Division One competition, finishing as both premiers and champions, defeating Wollongong United 1–0 in the grand final. This would also see them promoted to the NSW Super League at the second tier of the Australian football league system and the first tier of the NSW football league system. This remains the highest tier the Rams have ever competed in.

From 1995 to 2000, Macarthur Rams spent five years in the NSW top flight, making the 'preliminary final' in 1998 and 1999. After the 2000 NSW Super League season, the league split, with ten of the fourteen NSW Super League teams forming the 'NSW Premier League', and the remaining teams maintaining the Super League. This made the new Premier League the top tier in NSW, relegating the Super League to second tier. For the first time in six years, the Rams would compete in the NSW second division, placing them back at the third tier of the Australian football league system at the turn of the century.

=== Pre-NPL era and return to First Division (2001–2012) ===
From 2001 to 2007, Macarthur Rams spent six years in the NSW Super League, consistently finishing mid-table. They achieved one play-off qualification spot in the six-year stint through goal-difference, losing 3–0 to Fraser Park in the elimination final. For the 2008 season, Football NSW looked to expand the Premier League and add two teams. This allowed the Rams to once again compete in the NSW first division, for the first time in eight years.

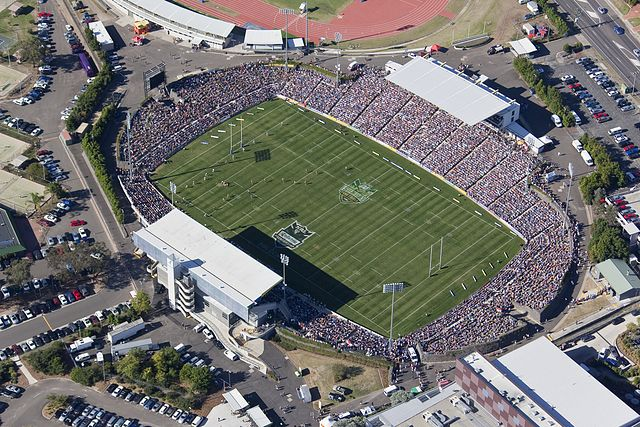
Macarthur Rams' 2008 NSW Premier League stadium, Campbelltown Stadium

For the 2008 NSW Premier League season, the Rams played their home matches at the largest stadium in South-West Sydney, Campbelltown Stadium. After one year back in the first division, the Rams were relegated back to the Super League at the end of the season.

The 2009 season saw Rams return to Lynwood park, and in the proceeding year qualifying for the elimination final play-off;, losing 3–0 to former NSL side Spirit FC after extra time. This was the beginning of a five-year streak of qualifying for the play-offs.

In 2011, a 4th-place finish saw the Rams once again qualify for the elimination final. Facing 5th-placed Granville Rage, a late Craig Cooley equaliser pushed the game to penalties, in which the Rams won 7–6. They then faced former NSL side St George FC in the 'minor semi-final', in which despite Rams taking a 1–0 lead in the 72nd minute, St George came back with 73rd, 75th and 90th-minute goals to win the match.

In 2012, the Rams defeated Mounties Wanderers 3–1 in the elimination final, before once again losing in the minor final; this time to former NSL side Bankstown Berries, with Dimitri Zakilis converting a stoppage time penalty to secure Berries' 2–1 win. This marked the end of Macarthur Rams' pre-NPL history.

=== NPL 2 years (2013–2019) ===
In 2013, the Football NSW governed leagues fell under the National Premier Leagues, leading the Rams to compete in NPL NSW 2, maintaining the status of their league at second highest in the state. The Rams' first season in NPL NSW 2 saw them finish second in the league and defeating Mounties Wanderers 2–1 in the qualifying final, before losing 2–1 to St George FC in the major semi-final. In 2014, a third-place finish saw Macarthur Rams qualify for the qualifying final, in which they defeated Central Coast Mariners 1–0. Proceeding to the major semi-final, they defeated former NSL side Parramatta FC 2–1. Leading them to the grand-final, they faced Parramatta once again at Gabbie Stadium in Seven Hills, in which they won the NPL NSW 2 championship by once again, beating them 2–1, courtesy of goals from Netfali Gonzalez and Gerard Ouffoue.

Following their championship winning season, they finished 9th of 12. The Rams then went on to finish 8th of 14 in the 2016 season, competing against the reserve teams of A-League Men clubs Western Sydney Wanderers, Sydney FC and Central Coast Mariners, as well as former NSL powerhouses Marconi Stallions and St George FC. They defeated the eventual premiers Sydney FC in a 4–2 win at Lynwood Park.

In the 2017 season, the Rams finished 13th in the league, despite defeating Western Sydney Wanderers and Central Coast Mariners, even defeating the latter on both home and away occasions. This season was followed by a 12th-placed finish, a one-place improvement.

In 2019, the Rams were relegated to the NPL NSW 3. This correlated with a 13th-placed finish, seeing them relegated with former NSL club Canterbury Bankstown.

=== NPL 3/League Two years (2020–2022) ===
Macarthur Rams' first season in NPL 3 was cut short due to the COVID-19 pandemic in NSW. Before the season's cancellation, the Rams finished 10th of 12.

The 2021 season would see a top 8 placement needed to secure promotion back to NPL 2, due to a restructuring of the Football NSW league system which was speculated to see the four NPL NSW leagues divide into three 16-team leagues. This speculation was backed as Football NSW restructured the 'Youth Leagues' to fit this format.

2021 also saw changes within the club, with long-serving chairman Gordon Sneddon resigning. It was announced on 21 May that the vacant position was filled by MFA M-League club Oran Park Rovers' chairman, Michael Giusti. In a period of change, it was announced that the Rams had parted ways with head coach Jason Breton. The position was then appointed to NPL 2 club Blacktown Spartans' former head coach and former Futsalroos captain, Brett Hewit.

In a repeat of the year previous, the 2021 season was cancelled, once again due to the COVID-19 pandemic. Before the season's cancellation, the Rams finished 8th. Due to the pandemic and the premature cancellation of the 2021 season, the men's Football NSW league system did not see the anticipated restructure, however NPL 2, NPL 3 and NPL 4 were renamed to League One, League Two and League Three respectively.

On 5 August 2021, the Rams announced the appointment of Blacktown Spartan's former technical director, Paul Bertolissio, as the club's 'Head of Football'. The 2021 season would also prove to be club stalwart Craig Cooley's last for the club. Cooley is the club's all-time appearance holder with over 350 matches played, along with captaining the club over 150 times. His departure marked the end of an 18-year-long era, having joined the club in 2003. In January 2022, the club announced a farewell for him in a friendly against League 1 side St George FC. The match would also be former Australia captain Mark Milligan's first game in charge of St George. The match was originally planned to be played a month prior against Northbridge Bulls, the feeder team of A-League Men side Macarthur FC; however it was cancelled due to COVID-19 cases within the Northbridge team. Cooley played his last game for Rams on 15 January in an eventual 1–1 draw with St George, also marking Rams' first game of the year.

On 22 March 2022, after an undefeated start to the 2022 season, Rams faced BDAFA Premier League side Greenacre Eagles in the 2022 Australia Cup. Greenacre, an amateur club from the 5th tier of Australian football, defeated the Rams 2–1. The shock result drew mentions from the Australian football community, with the Australia Cup promoting the result as a 'cupset'.

A week after scoring Rams' only goal in the cupset, Football Australia announced that Rams striker Anthony Haddad was called up to the Futsalroos squad for the 2022 AFF Futsal Championship in Bangkok, Thailand. On 5 April Haddad scored for Australia against Myanmar.

On 9 April 2022, the Rams suffered a 5–0 loss to Bankstown City FC, resulting in the largest score margin of a League Two game at the time.

On 18 July 2022, Rams secured promotion to NSW League One with four games remaining, after securing a point in a 0–0 draw with Bankstown United FC. The point guaranteed they would finish in the top eight of the league, which was only necessary due to Football NSW restructuring the number of teams within the state leagues.

On 30 July 2022, the Rams hosted Inter Lions SC in their final home game of the season. A victory for the Rams would secure a finals birth, whereas a victory for Inter Lions would secure them the premiership. Inter Lions went on to defeat the Rams in a shockingly high scoreline, securing the premiership with a 2–8 victory.

On 6 August 2022, the Rams played their final regular game of the season against Rydalmere Lions FC. Rams needed a win, as other results to go their way to qualify for the finals. On the morning of the game, Rams confirmed that club legend Mark Symington would retire at the end of Rams' campaign; meaning that the Rydalmere game could potentially be Symington's last. The Rams went on to win the game 1–2, with Dulwich Hill FC's 6-0 drubbing of Bankstown City FC confirming the Rams' finals qualification. Macarthur Rams ended the regular season with the joint-best defence in the league, level with Dunbar Rovers FC; despite Rams' five goals conceded against Bankstown City, and eight goals conceded against Inter Lions.

Rams continued to advance through the finals, defeating Brett Hewit's former club Canterbury Bankstown FC in a penalty shootout, sparking a pitch invasion at Jensen Park They proceeded to defeat Central Coast United FC 1–4, with former Australia Schoolboys captain Daniel Blachura dribbling through six players to assist Christian Torrelli's goal. The Rams then returned to Rydalmere Park to face the Lions once more to secure a spot in the grand final. The Rams pulled off a 2–3 victory, sending them to the grand final to face Inter Lions in a developing rivalry.

On 3 September 2022 the Rams travelled to neutral venue Sydney United Sports Centre for the grand final. After conceding first, the Rams equalised on the 82nd minute through Christian Torrelli. In the 5th minute of stoppage time, former Macedonia international Daniel Georgievski lost possession, leading to a Rams counterattack. Christian Torrelli played a through ball to Anthony Vastag, who converted the winner; winning the grand final in the 94th minute. The win marked the Rams' first title in eight years. After the game, goalkeeper Stevan Savicic was awarded with the 'Man of the Match' award, with Football NSW suggesting that Daniel Blachura was in close contention. Christian Torrelli ended the campaign as the Rams' top scorer with ten goals. Following the championship, Mark Symington fulfilled his retirement, with its potential fulfilment threatening throughout the previous 30 days, with each of Rams' knockout games threatening to end his career.

On 23 September 2022 Stevan Savicic and Brett Hewit were named the Goalkeeper and Coach of the Year respectively by Football NSW at the Hyatt Regency in Sydney.

== Colours and badge ==
Macarthur Rams' primary colour is maroon, often interchanged with purple in kits. Their secondary colour is grey, with their tertiary colour being either white or black. Their logo features a ram's face and horns, along with purple outlining the letters 'RAMS' in grey. Their previous logo was the face of a ram, similar to the current Macarthur Football Association logo.

== Stadiums ==
=== Lynwood Park ===
Lynwood Park is located in the Campbelltown suburb of St Helens Park, within the Campbelltown City Council. The venue is home to both Macarthur Rams and Macarthur Rams Women's, as well as their Youth and SAP teams. It features a synthetic pitch which was installed in 2016, a main grandstand with undercover seating for 520 spectators, a pavilion with some additional seating and standing room, and two grass hills. It also features a clubhouse with a bar, a board room and office space for the Macarthur Football Association. The lights are of Football NSW standard and allow for night matches. The complex also includes a further three grass football pitches, with pitches '3' and '4' being exclusively operated by local MFA club Campbelltown Uniting Church. It has an estimated total capacity of 3,000.

=== Campbelltown Stadium ===
In the 2008 NSW Premier League season, Macarthur Rams played at largest stadium in South-West Sydney, Campbelltown Stadium, located in the Campbelltown suburb of Leumeah. During the 2010s, the Rams played annual friendlies against A-League clubs Western Sydney Wanderers and Sydney FC at the ground. The stadium holds 20,000 people, as well as 17,000 seats. Campbelltown Stadium is now used as the home ground of A-League Men side Macarthur FC, as well as one of NRL club Wests Tigers' home grounds.

=== Bensley Road Soccer Complex ===
During the Rams' early years as the Campbelltown Vikings, they played their games at Bensley Road Soccer Complex, a football complex in the Campbelltown suburb of Macquarie Fields. In the modern day, it is used as the home ground of Gunners Soccer Club. It now features three grass pitches and a clubhouse, with the main pitch having elevated standing room in the form of pitch-long steps.

== Rivalries ==
=== Camden Tigers ===
Macarthur Rams share a rivalry with NSW League Three club Camden Tigers, due to being the only two clubs from Macarthur that compete in the Football NSW league system; often referred to as 'representative' football regarding Youth and SAP age groups. The rivalry is also fuelled by the common players and coaches movement to and from both clubs through Youth and Seniors, as well as the general perception of Rams' superiority as they have historically competed in higher leagues. The Rams' status as the association's 'federation team' also pushes this perception.

Due to both clubs' men's teams not competing in the same league, the rivalry is particularly present in the Youth age groups, as both clubs compete in the Football NSW Boys Youth League 3. The rivalry in the Youth League was pushed as for five fixtures in a row from 2020 to 2021, all the matches had been scheduled and played at Ron Dine Memorial Reserve, the home ground of Camden Tigers. This has meant that Rams had never played Tigers at home, despite being in the same league for two years. This ended on 5 March 2022, when they faced each other in Round 3 of the league. The round concluded with one win for Tigers and four wins for Rams, with the U13s, U14s and U16s notably winning 8–1, 6–1 and 6–0 respectively.

This rivalry, however, does not transfer to SAP age groups as the clubs do not compete within the same SAP league structure; with Macarthur Rams fielding Football NSW SAP teams from U9s-U12s, and Camden Tigers fielding MFA administered M-SAP teams as U8s and U9s.

== Kit ==
Macarthur Rams' kits have traditionally been mainly plain maroon, often interchanged with purple. Their kits are currently supplied by Australian sportswear company Gioca.

On 13 October 2021, the club revealed their new kits for the upcoming 2022 season. The kits would see a new design, with the home kit featuring grey vertical stripes on a maroon shirt, and the away kit featuring black vertical stripes on a white shirt; a switch from the traditional plain maroon.

Period	Shirt sponsor (chest)	Home shirt sponsor (back)	Away shirt sponsor (back)	Shirt sponsor (sleeve)	Shorts sponsor
2020	Guardian Venue Management	–	–	–	–
2021	Guardian Venue Management	–	–	–	–
2022	Crystele Homes	Abruzzo Ceramics	Shafer Auto	New Age Veneers	Rams Home Loans
2023	Crystele Homes	Abruzzo Ceramics	Abruzzo Ceramics	New Age Veneers	South Western Logistics & Wests Leagues Club
2024	Crystele Homes				South Western Logistics & Wests Leagues Club

== Players ==
=== Men's squad ===
2024 FNSW League One Men's Squad' Updated 31 January 2024. Note: Flags indicate national team as defined under FIFA eligibility rules; some limited exceptions apply. Players may hold more than one non-FIFA nationality.

No.	Pos.	Nation	Player
1	GK	AUS	Andrew Parkin
2	DF	AUS	Michael Martin
3	DF	AUS	Alex Gollan (vice-captain)
4	DF	ITA	Giovanni Panuccio
5	DF	AUS	Jacob Sebayang
6	MF	AUS	Connor Spurway
7	FW	AUS	Jaidyn Dunn
8	MF	AUS	Will Miranda
9	FW	AUS	Anthony Proia
10	MF	AUS	John Fahmi (captain)
11	FW	AUS	Matthew Self
13	MF	AUS	Paul Soravia

No.	Pos.	Nation	Player
17	FW	AUS	Richard Shoueiki
21	FW	AUS	Leandro Guzman
22	MF	AUS	Darian Daghero
23	MF	AUS	Lucas Lesar
30	FW	AUS	Jacob Esposito
31	GK	JPN	Seiya Miyamoto
35	DF	JPN	Takayuki Kayano
38	DF	AUS	Aaron Green
99	FW	AUS	Nathan Manno

=== Women's squad ===
2024 NPL NSW Women's Women's Squad' Updated 31 January 2024. Note: Flags indicate national team as defined under FIFA eligibility rules; some limited exceptions apply. Players may hold more than one non-FIFA nationality.

No.	Pos.	Nation	Player
4		AUS	Libby Morris
5		AUS	Erin Gordon
8		AUS	Lara Dipple
11		AUS	Bronte Trew
13		AUS	Eliza Pereira
14	MF	JPN	Miku Sunaga
15	MF	AUS	Tea Mucenski
18	MF	AUS	Helena Halios-Lewis
19	FW	AUS	Olivia Sloan
20	MF	AUS	Chrystal Duggan
23		AUS	Renee Houliaras
24		AUS	Lola Sossai
26		AUS	Chelsea Barton
27		AUS	Jasmine Limon
28	MF	AUS	Madeleine Malone

No.	Pos.	Nation	Player
29		AUS	Mia Diacogiorgis
30		AUS	Danielle Bishop
31		AUS	Angelina Scamardella
33		AUS	Lotus Lopez
34		AUS	Maddison Swatridge
35	DF	AUS	Tenealle Hay
36	FW	AUS	Jorgi Webb
37		AUS	Hayley Santos
38	FW	AUS	Bianca Noble
39	DF	AUS	Alice Bishop
40		AUS	Chloe Hain
42	GK	AUS	Kaydi Christie
43		AUS	Amalia Plummer
45		AUS	Jayla Li On Wing
46	GK	AUS	Teresa Morrissey

=== Former notable players ===
- Kosta Barbarouses – Current South Melbourne, Former A-League and New Zealand National Team player
- Jake McGing – Current Mounties Wanderers FC and Former A-League player
- Steven Old – Former A-League player and New Zealand National Team player
- Brett Emerton – Former Blackburn Rovers Premier League and Australia National Team player
- David Carney – Former Everton Premier League and Australia National Team player
- Paul Reid – Former Brighton & Hove Albion Championship player
- Dion Valle – Former Colo Colo Primera División of Chile player
- Glen Trifiro – Former Central Coast Mariners A-League player
- Cole Tinkler – Former New Zealand Knights A-League player
- Matt Thompson – Former A-League player

=== Nathan Garriock Award ===
Each year, Macarthur Rams present an award to the Youth 'Player of the Year'. The award is reflective of the recipient's playing performances, as well as their general contribution to the club. The current recipient of the Nathan Garriock Award is Harry Elson. The only player to have received the award multiple times is Cameron Sneddon.

The award is in honour of Nathan Garriock, a Rams Youth player who was murdered at a house party in Camden. He is also the sister of former Matildas player Heather Garriock.

Nathan Garriock Award recipients
Year	Recipient
2023	Cameron Lancaster
2022	Harry Elson
2021	Harrison Ashton
2020	Andrew Parkin
2019	Cameron Sneddon
2018	Cameron Sneddon
2017	Brodie O’Neill
2016	Aidan Limbrey
2015	Benjamin Baxter
2014	George Marentis
2013	Jordan Cracknell
2012	Andrew Head
2011	Brodie Clarkson
2010	Joran Pyne
2009	Nathan Bertolissio
2008	Tynan Williams
2007	Scott Harrison
2006	Alex C
2005	Daniel Micallif
2004	Ben Cornish
2003	Jay Valentine

== Junior football ==
Macarthur Rams field junior teams from the age groups of U9s to U18s, in alignment with the Football NSW league structures. These teams compete in the Football NSW Skills Acquisition Program (SAP) and the Football NSW Boys Youth League 3. All age groups and teams play at Lynwood Park.

=== SAP ===
The Rams' U9s, U10s, U11s and U12s teams compete in the Football NSW Skills Acquisition Program (SAP) competition; the highest tier and only competition in that age range under Football NSW jurisdiction. Results are not counted in SAP, so teams are unable to be promoted or relegated.

On 5 October 2022 Rams announced that Dean Plaatjies would replace former Premier League and Socceroos player, Brett Emerton as the Technical Director of the SAP program. Emerton would instead become the U13s Head Coach in the Youth Program.

==== SAP coaching staff ====
2024 SAP coaching staff
Age group	Boy's head coach	Girl's head coach
U13		Patrick Picot
U12	Justin Garland	Cameron Ha
U11	Paul Faulks	Brett Jackson
U10	Will Miranda	Brad Delahay
U9	Nado Vukosa	

=== Youth ===
The Rams' U13s, U14s, U15s, U16s and U18s teams compete in the Football NSW Boys Youth League Two competition; the second highest tier competition in that age range under Football NSW jurisdiction. Youth teams are able to be promoted or relegated, via the Football NSW 'Club Championship' system, in which points across all age groups (excluding U13s) are added together and presented on a table alongside all other clubs within the league.

==== Youth coaching staff ====
2024 Youth Coaching Staff
Age group	Boy's head coach	Girl's head coach
U18	Jeff Miranda	Carlos Guajardo
U16	Daniel Blachura	Dwayne Pearson
U15	Dean Plaatjies	Liam McDonagh
U14	Brett Emerton	Jamie Penman
U13	Alan Golledge	

=== Macarthur Football Association squads ===
Alongside their own junior teams, the Rams have a sister program ran by the Macarthur Football Association to help source players and maintain a football pathway. These teams operate under the name 'Macarthur Football Association', commonly referred to as 'MFA' or 'Macarthur FA'. MFA teams also compete in SAP, but youth teams (U13s, U14s, U15s, U16s and U18s) compete in the Football NSW administered Association Youth League (AYL), located fourth in the Football NSW boys youth system, one tier below Rams. The AYL consists of teams representing their respective regional association, and cannot be promoted or relegated.

Following the end of the 2022 season, the Macarthur Football Association announced that Paul Bertolissio, Rams' Head of Football would have his role extended to the Head of Football of the MFA teams. Although remaining as a sister program, the appointment brought the MFA teams under the auspices of Macarthur Rams. Following the appointment, the programs began to share resources, with the Rams facilitating and promoting the MFA's trials.

=== Macarthur Rams Academy ===
In September 2022, Macarthur Rams announced their open, registration based program called the 'Macarthur Rams Academy'. For the first time, Rams would provide an official program for 7- and 8- year olds. The program would offer two training sessions weekly for both male and female players aged between 7 and 16.

== Club officials ==
=== Board of directors ===
Role	Men	Women
Chairman	Michael Giusti	Michael Giusti
Treasurer	Leanne Versteeg	Leanne Versteeg
Secretary	Matt Spalding	Matt Spalding
Director	Kaashief Boonzaier	Gail Hohberg
Director	Daniel Lettieri	Shane Burke
Director		Jason Frendo
Seniors' Convener	Les Cox	
Youth Convener	Kate McLaren	Leanne Cannarella
Member Protection Officer		

=== Senior coaching and medical staff ===
Role	Men	Women
Head of Football	Paul Cotte	Paul Cotte
Head Coach	Daniel Mijovic	Victoria Guzman
Goalkeeping Coach	Trinity Allen	Trinity Allen
Physiotherapist	Elite Edge Physiotherapy	Elite Edge Physiotherapy

== Honours ==
=== League ===
- Football NSW League One
  - Winners (2): 1993, 2014
  - Premiers (1): 1993
- Football NSW League Two
  - Winners (1): 2022
