= FC Gazy Auburn =

- Full name: Gazije
- Nickname: Gazije
- Founded: 2002
- Ground: Progress Park, Auburn
- League: NSW State League
- 2019: 8th
- Website: https://websites.sportstg.com/team_info.cgi?c=1-9353-0-401949-25065773

FC Gazy is an Australian soccer club, based and located in the Auburn area of New South Wales. In season 2019, they competed in the NSW State League competition.

== History ==
Formed by the Bosnian community of Western Sydney in 2002 as Gazy Lansvale the club entered the then NSW State League 2 competition in 2015 as FC Gazy Lansvale. In their first season, the club picked up only 3 wins and finished 8th out of the 10 teams.

In 2016 the club finished last in the rebranded NSW State League competition with only 3 wins.

The club is a seniors-only side (18s, 20s and 1st grade).

== See also ==
- FC Bossy Liverpool
