= Lynwood Park =

Association football stadium in St Helens Park, New South Wales, Australia

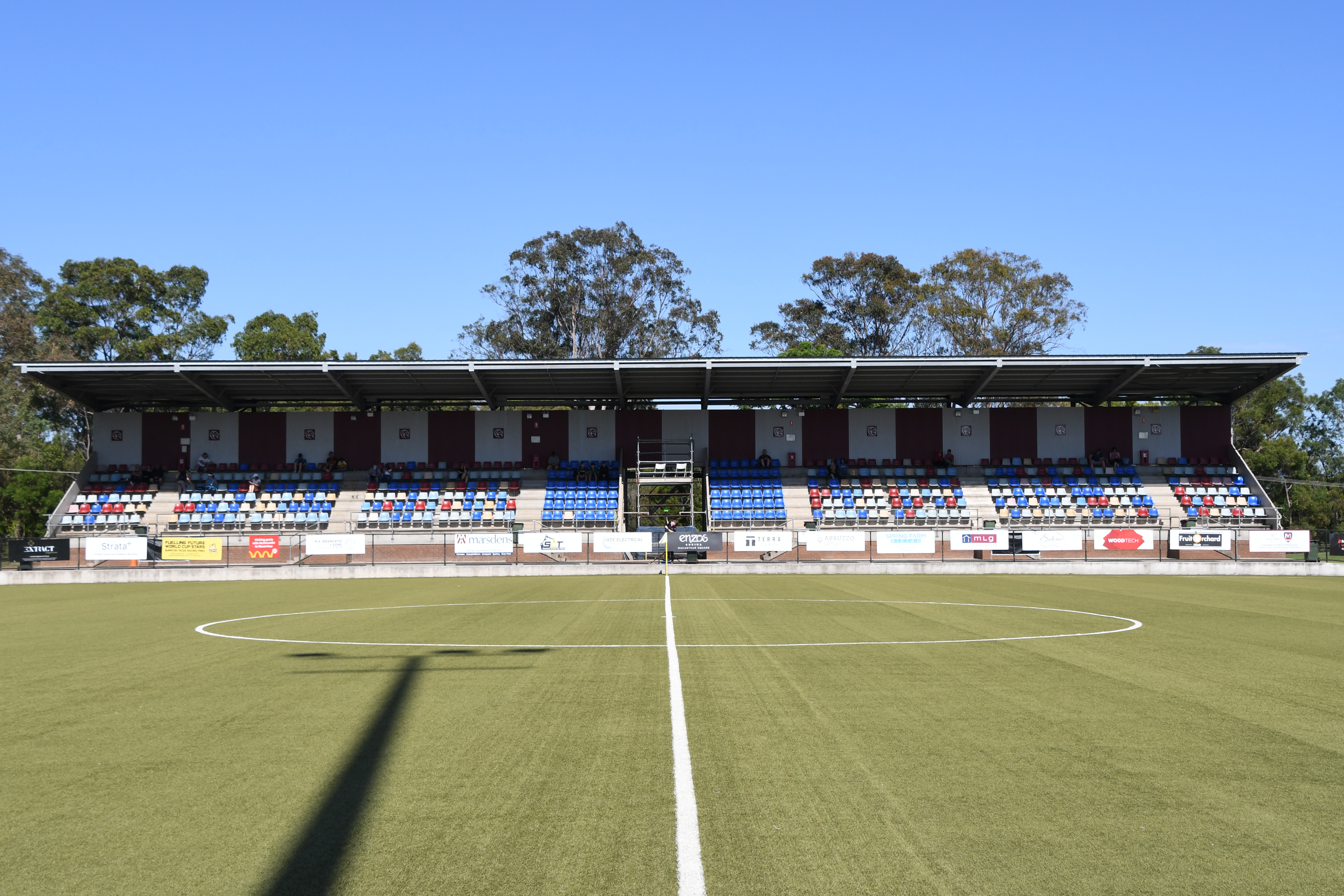
- Interactive map of Lynwood Park
- Location: St Helens Park, Campbelltown, New South Wales, Australia
- Coordinates: 34°6′3″S 150°49′26″E
- Elevation: 142 metres
- Owner: City of Campbelltown
- Operator: Macarthur Football Association
- Capacity: 3,000 (550 seated)
- Surface: Artificial turf
- Scoreboard: Yes
- Parking: 260 spaces

Construction
- Renovated: 2016
- Cost: $1.4 million

Tenant
- Macarthur Rams FC Macarthur Rams FC (Womens) Campbelltown Uniting Church FC Macarthur Football Association

Lynwood Park is a football stadium in St Helens Park, Campbelltown, New South Wales, Australia, which has a capacity of 3,000. Owned by Campbelltown City Council, it is the second largest stadium in Macarthur. The stadium is the home ground of Macarthur Rams FC, hosting both its men's and women's teams' games.

== History ==
=== Redevelopments ===
In August 2013, the Macarthur Football Association announced a proposed redevelopment of Lynwood Park. The redevelopment would consist of the installation of a synthetic pitch, as well as other general improvements to the facility. The pitch was to be made of a compressed road base, a drainage cell, 25mm of shock absorption rubber, carpet, grass strands, sand and rubber pellets.

In May 2014, the City of Campbelltown signed a pledge to contribute $700 thousand to the redevelopment of Lynwood Park, which would complement $500 thousand contributed by the Australian Government, as well as $200 thousand contributed by the Macarthur Football Association. Liberal Cr Paul Hawker suggested that the venue could be used as the training facility for a potential A-League Men team located in the area.

The allocation sparked political conversation, climaxing with a two-hour debate between Liberal MP Russell Matheson, and Labor Councillor Anoulack Chanthivong regarding the need for such an investment.

In 2016, the redevelopment was complete, with the construction cost totalling $1.4 million.

In 2017, the surface passed the '12 month defects period'.

In May 2020, construction began on a new $1.2 million amenities building, located at 'field 3', operated by Campbelltown Uniting Church FC. The development doubled the size of the previous clubhouse, and added a meeting room, a canteen, change rooms, a store room, toilets, an accessible toilet, and a referee’s room.

In 2021, large fences behind the goals were installed, as well as a new speaker system.

== Structure and facilities ==
Lynwood Park features a synthetic pitch, a grandstand with 520 undercover seats, a terrace with additional seating and standing room, and two grass spectator hills. It also features a clubhouse which contains a bar, a meeting room and office space for the Macarthur Football Association. The floodlighting is of Football NSW standard. The complex also includes a further three grass football pitches, with pitches '3' and '4' being operated by Campbelltown Uniting Church FC.

== Transport ==
Lynwood Park is in close proximity to bus stops on the 884W and 885 bus routes. Spectators can get off at the stop located at The Church Of Jesus Christ of Latter Day-Saints on Karrabul Rd, or the stop located where Wedderburn Rd, Karrabul Rd, and Rangers Rd converge. Spectators can then take a 4-minute walk to the stadium.
