= National Premier Leagues NSW Women's =

- Founded: 2014
- Country: Australia
- State: NSW
- Confederation: Asian Football Confederation
- Number of clubs: 14
- Level on pyramid: 2
- Relegation to: NSW League One Women's
- Domestic cup: Sapphire Cup
- Current champions: Bulls FC Academy (2025)
- Current premiers: Bulls FC Academy (2026)
- Website: womens.nplnsw.com.au
- Current: 2026 National Premier Leagues NSW Women's

The National Premier Leagues NSW Women's, also known as the NPL NSW Women's, is a soccer competition in New South Wales, Australia. The competition is conducted by Football NSW, the organising body in New South Wales. The league is a subdivision of the second tier National Premier Leagues Women's structure, which sits below the national A-League Women. Prior to becoming a subdivision of the NPL in 2014, the league was previously known as the Women's Premier League.

== History ==
A Football NSW panel completed a review on women's football in NSW in 2013, with a view to staying aligned with the FFA's pathway for women's football. This resulted in an inaugural NPL competition in 2014, with NSW being the first in the country to introduce a women's competition under the NPL banner. The Football NSW Institute were the inaugural champions.

== Clubs ==
The following 14 clubs took part in the 2026 season.

APIA Leichhardt
Bulls FC Academy
Gladesville Ravens
Hills United
Illawarra Stingrays
Macarthur Rams
Manly United
Northern Tigers
NWS Spirit
Sydney Olympic
Sydney University
UNSW FC
Western City Rangers
Western Sydney Wanderers

== Honours ==
Season	Premiers	Champions
2014	Macarthur Rams	Football NSW Institute
2015	Macarthur Rams	Sydney University
2016	Sydney University	Sydney University
2017	Macarthur Rams	Manly United
2018	Sydney University	Macarthur Rams
2019	Sydney University	Sydney University
2020	Sydney University	Manly United
2021	Cancelled due to the COVID-19 pandemic in Australia.	
2022	Sydney University	Macarthur Rams
2023	APIA Leichhardt	Macarthur Rams
2024	Macarthur Rams	Macarthur Rams
2025	Bulls FC Academy	Bulls FC Academy

== See also ==
- National Premier Leagues NSW
