= FC Bossy Liverpool =

- Full name: FC Bossy Liverpool
- Nickname: Bossy
- Founded: 1994
- Ground: ABHCA Leppington, Leppington, New South Wales
- League: Southern Districts
- Website: www.fcbossyliverpool.com

FC Bossy Liverpool is an Australian soccer club based in Leppington, New South Wales who competed in the New South Wales Super League. The club is currently playing in the Southern Districts Football Association.

== History ==
Established in 1994 by Bosnian immigrants from the Liverpool area of south-west Sydney, their primary supporter base has been the local Bosnian Australian community.

== Supporters ==
FC Bossy generally draws support from the Bosnian community, especially from the south-western suburbs of Sydney such as Liverpool, Casula and Lurnea.

== Honours ==
- NSW Super League:
  - Premiers (1): 2005
  - Champions (1): 2008

== See also ==
- FC Gazy Auburn
