= Valentine Sports Park =

Australian soccer stadium

- Interactive map of Valentine Sports Park
- Location: Glenwood, Sydney, New South Wales, Australia
- Coordinates: 33°44′23″S 150°56′41″E
- Owner: Football NSW
- Operator: Football NSW
- Capacity: 4,000 (venue capacity); 500 (seating capacity)
- Surface: Grass

Construction
- Opened: 2015
- Cost: $22,000,000 (2015)

Tenants
- Football NSW 2015– Sydney FC NPL 2023–

Valentine Sports Park is an Australian football stadium in Glenwood, a suburb of Sydney.

It is the home of Football NSW. The venue received a $22 million transformation and was officially re-opened in March 2015. The impressive facility features five full-sized football fields all aligned to FIFA specifications, including three natural grass fields and two synthetic fields, all of which have lighting, six player change rooms and a multi-purpose indoor sports centre featuring an international full-sized futsal court.

The main field features grandstand seating for 500 spectators and a grass hill surrounding the pitch, allowing for an estimated capacity of around 4,000. 200 lux lighting allows for semi-professional standards. Valentine Sports Park regularly hosts NPL NSW matches and has hosted international U20 matches and national team trainings in the past.

Prior to the completion of the re-development, the venue was shortlisted to be a training venue for the 2015 Asian Cup.

The venue hosted the 2024 Sapphire Cup Final, won by Northern Tigers over Sydney University.
