= Hensley Athletic Field =

Sports venue in Sydney, New South Wales

Coordinates: 33.94709°S 151.22263°E

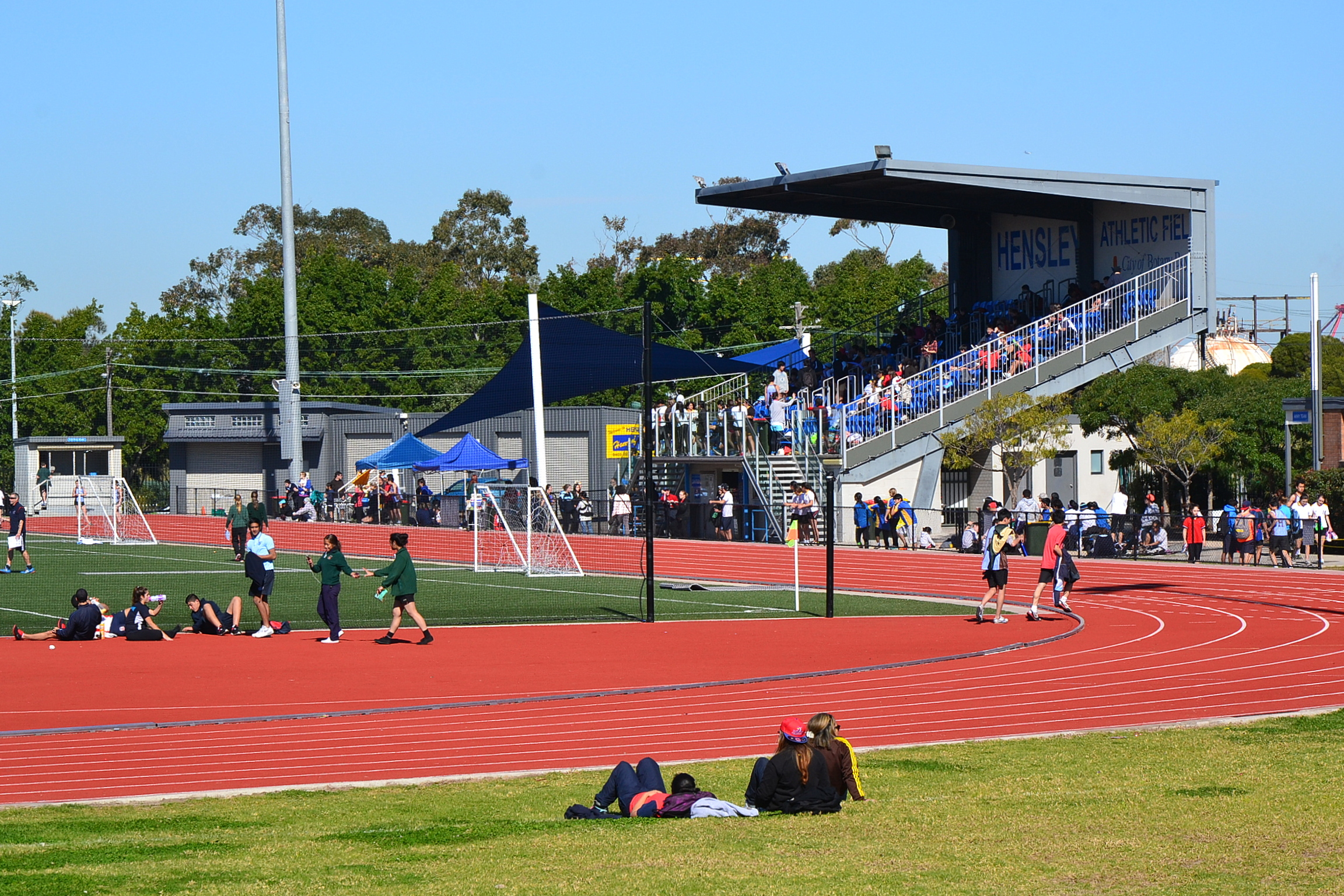
- Interactive map of Hensley Athletic Field
- Location: Denison Street, Eastgardens
- Capacity: 1,000
- Surface: Artificial

Construction
- Architect: Walter Ozeryanskiy Studios

Tenants
- Hakoah Sydney City East; Dunbar Rovers FC

Hensley Athletic Field is primarily a track and field athletics field, home ground of the Randwick-Botany Little Athletics Club and the South Sydney Athletics Club, it is also used as a ground for association football in Sydney, Australia. The track was the first all weather synthetic athletics track in Australia when it was installed in 1973.

It is now mainly used for school and association athletics, and association football and the NSW National Premier Leagues where it is the home ground for Dunbar Rovers NPL and Hakoah Sydney City East. The field has a capacity of 1,000 people.
