= Hurstville City Minotaurs FC =

Hurstville City Minotaurs
- Full name: Hurstville City Minotaurs Football Club
- Nickname: The Minotaurs
- Founded: 1985
- Ground: Beverly Hills Park, Beverly Hills, New South Wales
- Manager: Peter 'The General' Sarikakis
- League: St George Premier League
- 2026: 10th (relegated)
- Website: http://www.hurstvillecityminotaurs.com.au/
Home colours

Hurstville City Minotaurs is a semi-professional Australian association football club based in Hurstville, New South Wales.

== History ==
Hurstville City Minotaurs Soccer Club was established in 1985 by Greeks in Sydney, specifically Greeks who trace their roots back to the island of Crete. The club traditionally plays in a black and white striped jersey design.

In the early years, the Cretan Association were annual financial supporters of the club. Since this ceased, the Minotaurs have continued to exist with support from various private sponsors.

Minotaurs played their last season in NSW Mens State League 2019 before relegated from Football NSW structure for 2020.

== Current squad ==
Note: Flags indicate national team as defined under FIFA eligibility rules; some limited exceptions apply. Players may hold more than one non-FIFA nationality.

No.	Pos.	Nation	Player
1	GK	AUS	James Law
2	DF	AUS	Alexi Brakatselos
4	MF	AUS	Nick Mouzourakis
6	MF	AUS	Nico Le Roucs
7	MF	AUS	Angelo Vagenas
8	MF	AUS	Nick Nisbet
9	MF	AUS	Jason Gonzalez
10	MF	AUS	Bojan Srbinovski
11	DF	AUS	Cory Sharma-Constance
12	MF	PLE	Modar Sultan
13	FW	COL	Juan Botero
14	FW	AUS	Michael Martinovic
15	MF	AUS	Seyf Eser
16	MF	BRA	Matheus Pontes

No.	Pos.	Nation	Player
17	FW	BRA	Thiago Rabinovitch
21	GK	AUS	Dean Vagenas
22	FW	AUS	Sebastian Zanacchi
23	DF	AUS	Keifer Dotti
27	DF	AUS	Steven
30	MF	FRA	Riyad Agn
32	MF	SCO	Alan Omalley
33	MF	AUS	Peter Fterniatis
35	DF	AUS	Mate Balazs
34	DF	SCO	Brodie Cattanach-Rodger
37	FW	AUS	Sam Mehana
38	DF	SCO	Alistair Wilson
40	DF	SCO	Dylan Cook
42	DF	SCO	Hendry O'Niell

Updated June 2019

== Honours ==
First Grade

- 1991 – NSW 7th Division Champions
- 1992 – NSW 2nd Division Runners Up
- 1994 – NSW 2nd Division Champions
- 1995 – NSW 1st Division Runners Up
- 1997 – NSW 1st Division Minor Premiers
- 1998 – NSW 1st Division Runners Up
- 2007 – NSW 2nd Division Minor Premiers and Champions
- 2010 – NSW 2nd Division Runners Up
- 2020 – St George Premier League 2 Minor Premiers
- 2022 – St George Premier League 2 Minor Premiers & Champions

Reserve Grade

- 2020 – St George Premier League 2 Minor Premiers & Champions
- 2022 – St George Premier League 2 Minor Premiers & Champions

Club Championships

- 2020 – St George Premier League 2 Club Champions
- 2022 – St George Premier League 2 Club Champions

Over 45s 'Legends' St George Football Association O4s

- 2015 – St George Football Association Minor Premiers & Champions
- 2016 – St George Football Association Minor Premiers & Champions
- 2017 – St George Football Association Minor Premiers & Champions
- 2018 – St George Football Association Minor Premiers & Champions
- 2019 – St George Football Association Minor Premiers & Champions
- 2020 – St George Football Association Minor Premiers & Champions
- 2021 – St George Football Association Minor Premiers (No Finals series)
- 2022 – St George Football Association Minor Premiers & Champions

Football NSW Champions of Champions

- 2016 – Champions
- 2018 – Champions
- 2019 – Champions
- 2022 – Champions
