= Sapphire Cup =

- Founded: 2023
- Region: New South Wales
- Teams: 162 (in 2022)
- Current champions: UNSW FC (1st title)
- Most championships: APIA Leichhardt (2 titles)
- Website: footballnsw.com.au
- 2026 Sapphire Cup

The Sapphire Cup is a women's knockout cup competition in New South Wales, run by the governing body of football Football NSW. Teams competing in the competition come from the female National Premier League and NSW League One competitions, as well as clubs from senior women's clubs of semi-professional and amateur competitions from across the state. The competition is held during the Women's National Premier League season.

== History ==
Ahead of the 2023 FIFA Women's World Cup which was to be co-hosted by Australia and New Zealand, the governing body of football in New South Wales, Football NSW announced a new women's knock out cup tournament, that would replicate the men's Waratah Cup The name of the competition was a nod to the historical roots of women's football in NSW, named after the NSW Sapphires who represented New South Wales between 1996 and 2004 in the Women's National Soccer League, which was the precursor competition to the professional A-League Women.

It was announced by Football Australia that starting in 2024, the winners of the Sapphire Cup will have the opportunity to qualify for the Women's Australia Cup, which will run parallel to the men's competition. The winner of the women's Australia Cup will have the opportunity to participate in the AFC Women's Club Championship.

The first Sapphire Cup final was contested by two Sydney-based teams, APIA Leichhardt and Northern Tigers. APIA Leichhardt would take the inaugural title, defeating Northern Tigers 2–1 at Leichhardt Oval. The following season, the Northern Tigers went one step further, lifting the trophy after a 2–1 victory over Sydney University SFC.

== Honour roll ==
Year	Winners	Score	Runners-up	Venue
2023	APIA Leichhardt	2–1	Northern Tigers	Leichhardt Oval
2024	Northern Tigers	2–1	Sydney University	Valentine Sports Park
2025	APIA Leichhardt	3–0	Western City Rangers	Valentine Sports Park
2026	UNSW FC	1–0	Manly United	Valentine Sports Park
