= Bulls FC Academy =

- Full name: Bulls FC Academy
- Founded: 1952; 74 years ago
- Ground: Northbridge Oval
- Chairman: Sam Krslovic
- Manager: Nicolai Müller (men's); Marty Garces (women's)
- League: NSW League One (men's); NPL NSW (women's)
- 2026 (men's) 2026 (women's): 9th of 16; 1st of 14 (premiers)
- Website: macarthurfc.com.au/bulls-fc-academy/
Home colours	Away colours

Bulls FC Academy is a semi-professional soccer club based in the Sydney suburb of Northbridge, New South Wales, Australia.

Founded in 1952 as Northbridge Football Club, Bulls FC Academy was formed in 2023 following a merger between Northbridge FC and Macarthur FC. The men's team plays in the NSW League One, while the women's team plays in the NPL NSW Women's. They play matches at Northbridge Oval.

== History ==
Club logo as Northbridge FC

Northbridge FC was established in 1952 by local postman Ron Hall who had previously relocated from his work in the coalfields in the Cessnock area of the Hunter Valley. The club originally competed in the Northern Suburbs Soccer Association (NSSA). The original playing strip was a red and white shirt, white shorts and red and white hooped socks. In 1973, Northbridge joined the Ku-Ring-Gai and District Soccer Association (now the Northern Suburbs Football Association).

=== Association with Central Coast Mariners ===
Club logo as North Shore Mariners

In 2014, Northbridge established an agreement with A-League club Central Coast Mariners to form a youth development academy in Sydney's North Shore. As part of the partnership the North Shore Mariners Academy was based at Northbridge FC. The move led to accusations from Sydney FC that the Mariners were encroaching on their territory. On forming the partnership the Mariners stated that they believe Northbridge to be the biggest club (in terms of player numbers) in the Southern Hemisphere.

In 2015, as a result of the Central Coast Mariners affiliation, the club's senior teams changed their name and colours to reflect the Mariners and in doing so, became the North Shore Mariners.

=== Return to Northbridge name ===
On 27 October 2020 the club announced it was returning to the Northbridge FC name, as the partnership with Central Coast Mariners was being discontinued.

On 21 December 2020 the announced to form a partnership agreement with A-League club Macarthur FC. The agreement will see all teams play as Northbridge FC Bulls with playing kits incorporating both the Northbridge and Macarthur FC logos respectively.

=== Bulls FC Academy ===
In 2023, Having operated as a joint venture for the past two National Premier League seasons, Bulls FC Academy will become a single entity from the start of the 2023 season. The Bulls FC Academy will compete in the National Premier Leagues NSW next season following a merger between Northbridge Football Club and Macarthur FC.

== Home ground ==
The club its home ground at Northbridge Oval. The Oval had a million-dollar upgrade, including resurfacing with synthetic turf and new floodlights in early 2011. However, as the ground did not meet the NPL NSW 1 criteria, the men's team had to move to play their home games at the Sydney United Sports Centre for the 2021 season. and for the 2023 season. Previous play out in Lambert Park in 2020 season.

== Men's team ==
=== History ===
==== NSW State League 1 / NSW NPL 3 ====
In 2011, after spending their entire existence in the local league, Northbridge FC successfully entered Football NSW's state league competition, the 3rd tier of NSW football and fourth tier overall. They won the NSW State League Division One Premiership in 2013, but went on to lose the Grand Final to Balmain in extra time.

The 2014 season once again saw Northbridge fall short of the title – losing to Hakoah Sydney City East FC 3–2, with Hakoah going on to get promoted to the NSW NPL2.

Throughout 2014 and the years leading up, Northbridge, experienced significant growth, with over 2,300 registered players in early 2014. This made Northbridge the largest club in Australia by participation numbers.

In 2015 Northbridge had a successful season losing only one game late in the season (won 18, drew 3, lost 1) to take out the State League 1 premiership. Northbridge went on to win their first State League 1 grand final in 3 attempts beating Hills Brumbies in a 3–2 win, despite playing the last 15 minutes with 10 men.

==== NSW NPL 2 ====
The successful 2015 season saw Northbridge promoted to the National Premier Leagues NSW 2 competition for the first time in their history where they started the 2016 season alongside National Premier League debutants Sydney FC Youth, Western Sydney Wanderers FC Youth & Central Coast Mariners FC NPL.

Despite being competitive for the majority of games, the seniors only managed to win 3 matches. In the last round of the season, North Shore needed all three senior divisions (U18's, U20's and 1st's) to win and had to rely on other results to avoid relegation. All three divisions won and at the end of 2016 had finished 13th out of 14 on the Club Championship, thus avoiding relegation with Fraser Park FC dropping to the 3rd tier of NSW football instead.

2017 was a much more successful year for the North Shore outfit, with the Mariners finishing the year in 5th position.

Another year of improvement in the NPL NSW 2 saw the senior team finish 3rd in the 2018 season. Though North Shore were eliminated in the first round of the finals, season 2018 was the highest league position finish for the club to date.

In 2019, North Shore experienced their most successful season in history, finishing first in both the NPL NSW 2 and the club championship, which resulted in promotion to NPL NSW 1. The club sealed promotion on the final round of the season.

==== NSW NPL 1 ====
As a result of winning the 2019 NPL2 Club Championship North Shore have been promoted to NPL1 for the first time in their history and will play their games out of Lambert Park, Leichhardt.

In 2021 season North Shore become Northbridge FC Bulls will play their games in multiple locations. Their head coach is Mile Sterjovski.

=== Current squad ===
As of February 2023

Note: Flags indicate national team as defined under FIFA eligibility rules; some limited exceptions apply. Players may hold more than one non-FIFA nationality.

No.	Pos.	Nation	Player
1	GK	AUS	Alexander Robinson
2		AUS	Anthony Krilic
3	DF	AUS	Isaac Hovar
4		AUS	Luka Sterjovski
5		AUS	Jonathan Maras
6		AUS	Jaidyn Dunn
8		AUS	Mason Wells
9	FW	AUS	Diego Bonilla
10	FW	TUR	Ayman Gulasi
11		AUS	Roger Djuma
12		AUS	Charlie Ragg
13		AUS	Jordan Ivancic
14		AUS	Sunday Yona
16	MF	AUS	Oliver Jones
17	MF	AUS	Rhys Youlley
18		AUS	Hassan Kamberovic

No.	Pos.	Nation	Player
19		AUS	Daanish Awaz
20		AUS	Adrian Knez
21		AUS	Lachlan Macdonald
22	MF	AUS	Edward Caspers
23		AUS	Flynn Madden
24		AUS	Dean Bosnjak
25		AUS	Samuel Bosnjak
27		AUS	Sebastian Duarte
28		AUS	Dylan Sacco
35		AUS	Theph Theph
40	GK	AUS	Griffin Barry
41	GK	AUS	Patrick Williams
—	FW	AUS	Ali Auglah
—	MF	AUS	Joel Bertolisso
—	MF	AUS	Marcus Sparacino

=== Club officials ===
- President: Sam Krslovic
- General Manager: Anthony Siciliano
- Head Of Academy: Shaf Sagol
- First Grade Head Coach: Nicolai Muller

=== Honours ===
- NPL NSW 2/NSW League One Club Championship
  - Winners: 2019
  NPL NSW 2/NSW League One Premiership
  - Winners: 2019
  NSW State League Division One/NSW League Two Club Championship
  - Winners: 2013, 2015
  NSW State League Division One/NSW League Two Premiership
  - Winners: 2013, 2015
  - Runners-up: 2014
  NSW State League Division One/NSW League Two Championship
  - Winners: 2015
  - Runners-up: 2013, 2014

== Women's team ==
The women's team competes in the National Premier Leagues NSW Women's.

=== Current squad ===
As of 16 March 2025

Note: Flags indicate national team as defined under FIFA eligibility rules; some limited exceptions apply. Players may hold more than one non-FIFA nationality.

No.	Pos.	Nation	Player
1	GK	JPN	Mio Nemoto
2	MF	LBN	Mya Callil
3		AUS	Samara Jirsa
4	MF	AUS	Ashley Henebery
5	MF	AUS	Elizabeth Grey (captain)
6		AUS	Arna Hogarth-Scott
10	FW	BRA	Tamires Souza
11	FW	AUS	Daniella Naeimi
12	MF	AUS	Jasmine Meli

No.	Pos.	Nation	Player
13	DF	AUS	Grace Johns
14		AUS	Petria Phillips
16	MF	NZL	Isabella Coco-Di Sipio
17		AUS	Sophia Furia
18		AUS	Ruby Davies
20	MF	AUS	Alyssa Rose
23	GK	AUS	Ashlee Brodigan
31	GK	AUS	Lily Taylor
33	FW	AUS	Jade Guichon

=== Honours ===
- National Premier Leagues NSW Women's Championship
  - Winners (1): 2025
- National Premier Leagues NSW Women's Premiership
  - Winners (2) 2025, 2026
