= Northern Tigers FC =

Northern Tigers
- Full name: Northern Tigers Football Club
- Founded: 2002 (1963 as Ku-Ring-Gai United)
- Ground: North Turramurra
- Capacity: 2,000
- Owner: Northern Suburbs Football Association
- Head Coach: Milad Popalzay
- League: NSW League One
- 2025: 6th of 16
- Website: http://northerntigersfc.com.au
Home colours	Away colours

Northern Tigers FC is a semi-professional association football club based in the northern suburbs area of Sydney, spanning the Lower North Shore, Upper North Shore and reaching up to Brooklyn on the banks of the Hawkesbury River. The Northern Tigers enter teams in the Football NSW League One (formerly National Premier Leagues NSW Men's 2) (Men and Boys), National Premier Leagues NSW Women's (Women and Girls), FNSW Skills Acquisition Program (Mixed Under 9 - Under 12 and Girls Under 10 - Under 13).

Home games are played at North Turramurra Recreation Area, with Charles Bean Sports Field, at the former Ku-ring-gai Campus of the University of Technology, Sydney acting as an additional facility.

== History ==
Ku-ring-gai & District Soccer Association purchased a NSW Soccer Federation Division One license from the Balmain Tigers FC in 2002. The name was then changed to Northern Tigers and the Northern Tigers FC was established.

In 2003 they were premiers of FNSW Men's Division 1 and were promoted to the NSW Super League (the second tier of soccer in New South Wales). In 2007 they were premiers of the Super League but declined promotion to NSW Premier League (the top tier of NSW soccer). In 2010 they were again champions of the Super League after defeating St George FC 4–0 in the grand final.

In 2015, the Northern Tigers were crowned champions of the NPL NSW2 season, however due to the club championship promotion criteria by Football NSW in which are points accumulated across the U-20's and U-18's as well, they were not promoted.

In 2024, the women's team won the Sapphire Cup with a 2-1 victory over Sydney University SFC at Valentine Sports Park.

== Club colours ==
Northern Tigers FC players wear white with bottle green when playing at home and purple with white when playing away.

== Location ==
The Northern Tigers have an intake area for players that includes most of the northern corridor of Sydney that stretches from the Sydney Harbour Bridge to the Hawkesbury River.

Players come from suburbs including Berowra, Gordon, Pymble, Lindfield, Killara, Lane Cove, Chatswood, Wahroonga, Artamon, Hornsby, Willoughby, and Turramurra.

== Notable former players ==
=== Socceroos ===
- Murray Barnes
- Robbie Hooker
- Bruce Djite
- Grant Lee
- Robert Wheatley

=== Matildas ===
- Rachel Lowe
- Thea Slatyer
- Servet Uzunlar
- Leigh Wardell
- Eliza Campbell
- Isabel Gomez

=== International ===
- Adam Foti

=== U20 Youth International ===
- Brett Hughes

=== AFC U19 Young Socceroos ===
- Travis Cooper

=== National League or A-League ===
- Andy Harper
- Brett Hughes
- Brian Ellem
- Duncan Worthington
- Stuart Robertson
- Adam Snyder
- James Stubbs-Mills
- Grant Last
- Derek Poimer

== Season by season record ==
Season	League										Cup	Top scorer		Ref.
Season	Div	Pld	W	D	L	GF	GA	Pts	Pos	Finals	Cup	Player(s)	Goals	Ref.
1964	NSW Amateur Div B	22	0	2	22	33	98	2	12th	N/A				
1965	NSW Inter-suburban Div 3	18	1	0	17	8	136	2	10th					
1966	DNP													
1967	NSW Inter Suburban Div 3 ↑													
1968	NSW Inter Suburban Div 4													
1969	NSW Inter Suburban Div 4													
1970	NSW Inter-suburban Div 4	18	5	2	11	47	61	12	7th					
1971	unknown													
1972	NSW Div 2 ↓	22	2	5	15	20	50	9	12th					
1973	NSW Div 3	22	14	2	6	60	25	30	3rd					
1974	NSW Div 3	22	15	2	5	42	19	32	3rd					
1975	NSW Div 3	22	13	4	5	39	19	30	2nd					
1976	NSW Div 3 ↑	22	13	5	4	49	18	31	1st					
1977	NSW Div 2	22	10	7	5	48	28	27	4th					
1978	NSW Div 2 ↑	22	15	5	2	57	20	35	1st					
1979	NSW State League (Note: NSW State League was the highest division for this season until 1982)	26	6	10	10	29	38	22	10th					
1980	NSW State League ↓	26	5	6	15	28	45	16	13th					
1981	NSW Div 1 (Note: NSW Div 1 was the second highest division for this season)	26	17	5	4	49	18	39	2nd					
1982	NSW Div 1 (Note: NSW Div 1 was the second highest division for this season only) ↑	26	18	4	4	48	17	40	1st					
1983	NSW Div 1 (Note: NSW Div 1 was the highest division for this season until 1992)	24	11	7	6	40	27	29	5th					
1984	NSW Div 1	22	7	7	8	26	32	21	6th					
1985	NSW Div 1	22	9	8	5	29	22	26	5th					
1986	NSW Div 1	22	9	8	5	23	17	26	5th					
1987	NSW Div 1	26	7	5	14	29	40	19	10th					
1988	NSW Div 1	26	4	12	10	26	43	20	11th					
1989	Merged with Artarmon to form North Shore United (NSW Div 2).													
1990	Merger continues as North Shore United in NSW Div 1.													
1991	North Shore United merged with Manly-Warringah for this season in NSW Div 1.													
1992	Manly merger ends, GNS United in Div 4 (promoted).													
1993	GNS United in Div 3 (withdrew at end of season).													
Ku-Ring-Gai District acquires NSW Div 1 License to form the Northern Tigers in 2002.
2003	NSW Div 1 (Note: This is the third highest division behind Winter Super League) ↑	26	19	4	3	61	22	61	1st	RU				
2004	NSW Super League	26	9	8	9	44	41	35	9th					
2005	NSW Super League	26	8	6	12	38	43	30	10th					
2006	NSW Super League	22	10	6	6	30	23	36	4th (Note: Teams were split into Groups A and B after 15 rounds, with top 5 overall qualifying for finals. Northern Tigers finished 2nd in Group B and 4th overall with 36 points.)	PF				
2007	NSW Super League	26	17	5	4	57	38	56	1st	RU				
2008	NSW Super League	22	8	5	9	31	31	29	6th					
2009	NSW Super League	22	8	3	11	34	46	27	7th					
2010	NSW Super League	22	13	4	5	45	26	43	2nd	W		Tom Spencer	15	
2011	NSW Super League	22	8	8	6	32	27	32	6th			Travis Cooper	7	
2012	NSW Super League	22	16	4	2	48	16	52	1st	W		Tom Spencer	15	
2013	NSW NPL 2	22	8	6	8	27	25	30	8th			Tom Spencer	9	
2014	NSW NPL 2	22	10	6	6	35	27	36	4th	PF	Playoff Rnd 2	Michael Smith	8	
2015	NSW NPL 2	22	12	5	5	36	22	41	3rd	W	7th Rnd	Tai Smith	10	
2016	NSW NPL 2	26	10	4	12	41	44	34	7th		4th Rnd	Liam McConaghy	11	
2017	NSW NPL 2	26	11	7	8	49	43	40	6th	EF	5th Rnd	Jordan Smylie	10	
2018	NSW NPL 2	26	10	9	7	44	39	39	5th	SF	5th Rnd	Liam McConaghy	15	
2019	NSW NPL 2	26	11	9	6	41	33	42	6th	EF	7th Rnd	Joshua Swadling	8	
2020	NSW NPL 2	10	6	2	2	26	12	20	3rd	RU	Cup Suspended	Shervin Adeli	6	
2021	NSW NPL 2	16	10	1	5	29	22	31	3rd		6th Rnd	Shervin Adeli	9	
2022	NSW League One*	14	8	1	5	32	22	25	4th		7th Rnd	Alexander Brown	9	

- Current Season in Play, Last round to be played on 1 August 2021

Source: ozfootball.net

== Northern Suburbs Football Association ==
The Northern Suburbs Football Association was formed in April 1957 as Ku-Ring-Gai & District Soccer Association (KDSA). There were five foundation clubs – Kissing Point, Wahroonga, West Pymble, North Turramurra and Lindfield. The first representative teams entered in NSW Federation competitions in 1959 or 1960, with the first senior representative side competing in 1963 as Ku-Ring-Gai United. In 1970 Ku-ring-gai merged with Artarmon to enter the NSW Federation competition and changed its name in 1972 to Ku-ring-gai Soccer Club. NSW Soccer Federation also approved the merger of the KDSA with the Northern Suburbs Soccer Association for the 1973 season. The district would continue to operate as KDSA. In 2012, the association changed its name to Northern Suburbs Football Association to more accurately reflect district boundaries and remain in line of the national use of "football" within federations.
