= Mounties Wanderers FC =

Mounties Wanderers
- Full name: Mounties Wanderers Football Club
- Nickname: Mounties
- Founded: 1978
- Ground: Mount Pritchard Oval; Wanderers Football Park
- Capacity: 5,000
- League: NSW League Two
- 2026: 1st of 16 (promoted) NSW League One
Home colours

Mounties Wanderers FC is a professional soccer club based in Mount Pritchard, New South Wales, Australia. They currently play in the NSW League One (formerly National Premier Leagues NSW 2) competition after being promoted at the conclusion of the 2026 season. They were formed in 1978 as Mount Pritchard Soccer Club, changing their name to Mounties Wanderers for the 2008 season after being sponsored by the Mounties Group. The Mounties group also sponsors the Mount Pritchard Mounties rugby club. The club was originally founded by the Maltese Australian community.

The club is led by Andre Schroder, who is currently undertaking his first season as a head coach at first-grade level. Despite being in his inaugural campaign, Schroder has quickly established a clear vision for the club’s future, focusing on professionalism, player development, and a sustainable pathway to higher levels of competition. His coaching philosophy emphasises tactical organisation, accountability, and creating a culture where players are encouraged to maximise their potential both individually and collectively.

Schroder has publicly outlined an ambitious five-year plan aimed at guiding Mounties Wanderer FC into the highest divisions of football in New South Wales. Central to this vision is the development of a competitive squad capable of progressing through the football pyramid while establishing the club as a recognised force within the state’s football landscape. Beyond state-level ambitions, Schroder has also expressed his desire to position Mounties Wanderer FC as a future contender for participation in the Australia Championship, reflecting the club’s long-term aspirations to compete on a national stage. Under his leadership, the current squad is viewed as the foundation of a project designed to deliver sustained success and elevate Mounties Wanderer FC to new heights.

The club is historically linked with the Maltese-Australian community, and features a Maltese cross on its logo.

== Seasons ==
Key to league competitions

- Div. 1 = Division 1, 2, 3 etc
- NSWSL = NSW Super League
- NPL1/2/3 = National Premier Leagues NSW
- NSWL1/2 = NSW League One & NSW League Two
- NSWSL1 = NSW State League 1, 2, 3 etc
- NSWIU = NSW Inter Urban Division 1, 2, 3 etc
- ^{P} Draws went to penalty shoot-outs during the 1993–1995 seasons (2 points for win, 1 point for loss).
- ^{1} Stage 1 of 1996 NSW Super League
- ^{2} Stage 1 of 1996 NSW Super League

Key to position colours and symbols

1st or W	Winners
2nd or RU	Runners-up
3rd	Third
♦	Top scorer in division

Key to cup and finals results

- 1R, 2R, 3R...7R = 1st Round, 2nd Round, 3rd Round...7th Round
- GS = Group Stage
- EF = Elimination Final
- PF = Preliminary Final
- PO = Playoff Final
- R32 = Round of 32
- R16 = Round of 16
- QF = Quarterfinals
- SF = Semifinals
- RU = Runners-Up
- W = Winners
- (P) = Promoted
- (R) = Relegated

Season	League										Waratah Cup	Australia Cup (Note: FFA Cup/Australia Cup (from 2014). Includes Australia Cup (1962–1968) and NSL Cup (1977–1997))
Season	Div	P	W	D	L	F	A	Pts	Pos	Finals	Waratah Cup	Australia Cup
2026 (P)	NSWL2	19	16	1	2	67	18	49	1st	–	R5	-
2025 (R)	NSWL1	30	6	7	17	30	52	25	16th	–	R3	-
2024 (P)	NSWL2	28	19	4	5	72	33	61	2nd	RU	R4	-
2023 (R)	NPL2	30	8	3	19	44	58	27	15th	–	R6	-
2022	NPL2	22	6	2	14	25	51	25	10th	–	R6	-
2021	NPL2	16	1	2	13	18	50	5	12th	–	R5	-
2020	DNC											
2019	NPL2	26	13	4	9	52	44	43	4th	SF	R6	-
2018	NPL2	26	11	5	10	53	50	38	6th	RU	R6	-
2017	NPL2	26	11	4	11	50	44	37	8th	–	R6	-
2016	NPL2	26	11	6	9	49	50	39	5th	SF	R7	-
2015	NPL2	22	3	6	13	21	43	15	12th	–	R5	-
2014	NPL2	22	9	5	8	35	33	32	5th	QF	R4	-
2013	NPL2	22	10	4	8	38	28	34	3rd	RU	R16	-
2012	NSWSL	22	9	5	8	33	28	32	4th	QF	R2	-
2011 (P)	Div1	22	19	1	2	63	13	58	1st	W	RU	-
2010	Div1	22	10	5	7	40	32	35	6th	–	R3	-
2009	Div1	22	14	4	4	45	25	46	2nd	W	R2	-
2008	Div1	22	9	3	10	34	41	30	8th	–	R3	-
2007	Div1	26	16	7	3	75	36	55	3rd	PF	R3	-
2006	Div1	26	17	4	5	49	26	55	2nd	PF	R2	-
2005	Div1	24	11	4	9	46	35	37	6th	–	R2	-
2004	Div1	26	13	1	12	43	38	40	6th	–	R1	-
2003	Div1	26	13	8	5	35	24	47	4th	W	-	-
2002	Div1	20	10	3	7	34	23	33	4th	W	-	-
2001	Div1	22	10	8	4	46	16	38	4th	EF	-	-
2000	Div2	22	11	4	7	31	24	37	5th	–	-	-
1999	Div2	22	8	5	9	31	34	29	7th	–	-	-
1998 (R)	Div1	25	4	5	16	33	57	17	13th	–	-	-
1997	Div1	30	13	7	10	42	47	46	7th	–	R2	-
1996	Div1	26	5	8	13	30	45	23	12th	–	R3	-
1995	Div1	22	6	5	11	36	38	27	10th	–	R4	-
1994	Div1	22	9	6	7	40	30	38	4th	EF	SF	-
1993	Div1	22	10	7	5	42	23	41	4th	EF	-	-
1992	Div1	26	11	6	9	44	38	43	6th	–	-	-
1991	NSWSL2	22	9	7	6	30	27	40	5th	–	-	-
1990 (P)	NSWSL3	22	14	3	5	43	17	31	2nd	RU	-	-
1989	NSWSL3	22	10	3	9	43	36	23	7th	–	-	-
1988 (P)	NSWIU3	22	6	5	11	33	44	17	6th	–	-	-
1987 (P)	NSWIU4	24	15	5	4	42	27	35	2nd	RU	-	-
1986 (R)	NSWIU3	22	4	1	17	22	60	9	11th	–	-	-
1985	NSWIU3	20	6	3	11	29	56	15	8th	–	-	-
1984	NSWIU3	20	7	2	11	33	38	16	6th	–	-	-
1983	NSWIU3	20	7	6	7	32	33	20	5th	–	-	-
1982	NSW Div5	22	4	9	9	29	35	17	9th	–	-	-
1981 (P)	NSW Div6	22	16	4	2	65	23	36	2nd	RU	-	-
1980	NSW Div6	22	2	3	17	19	67	7	11th	–	-	-
1979	NSW Div6	22	9	2	11	33	52	20	8th	–	-	-
1978 (P)	NSW Div7	22	5	0	17	32	69	10	11th	–	-	-

== Honours ==
- NSW Division 1/NSW League Two
  - Minor Premiers (2): 2011, 2026
  - Champions (4): 2000, 2003, 2009, 2011
