= Dunbar Rovers FC =

- Full name: Dunbar Rovers FC State League
- Nickname: Dunbar
- Short name: DRFC
- Founded: 1991; 2015 (as Dunbar Rovers FC State League)
- Ground: Fraser Park, Marrickville, Rockdale Ilinden Sport Centre, Sydney, Australia
- Capacity: 5,000
- Coach: Christian Soares
- League: NSW League Two
- 2025: 7th of 16
- Website: http://dunbarroversfc.com/
Home colours	Away colours

Dunbar Rovers FC is a semi-professional Australian association football club. They currently play in the NSW League Two Men's (formerly National Premier Leagues 3 New South Wales) competition in both First Grade and Under 20s.

They also play in the NSW League 2 Boys Youth competitions (Under 13, 14, 15, 16, 18), as well as various Men's, Women's and Girls & Boys Junior teams in the Eastern Suburbs Football Association.

In 2017, the Dunbar Rovers entered the NSW Girls Conference League and kicked off a unique fee-free program for talented female players.

In 2024, the club plays in First Grade and Under 20s of the NSW League One Men's (formerly National Premier Leagues 2 New South Wales) competition.
