= Sydney Uni SFC =

Sydney University
- Full name: Sydney University Soccer Football Club
- Nicknames: The Students, Uni
- Founded: 1946
- Ground: University of Sydney No. 2 Oval
- Capacity: 1,200
- Coach: Louie Cordwell
- League: NSW League Two
- 2025: 11th of 15
- Website: http://www.susf.com.au/soccer.html
Home colours

Sydney University Soccer Football Club (SUSFC) is an Australian semi-professional association football club based in Sydney. Founded in 1946, the club has over 40 constituent teams with over 600 players competing in the Football New South Wales National Premier Leagues (NPL), North West Sydney Women's Football, the Eastern Suburbs Football Association and the Canterbury District Soccer Football Association. The Club is run by an executive committee elected annually by members.

SUSFC's main home ground is University of Sydney No. 2 Oval, a multi-use venue located in the University of Sydney. The club also plays on St. Andrew's Oval, St. John's Oval and University No.1 Oval. The club's NPL Youth Teams play their home games at Arlington Oval. The Club is a member of Sydney Uni Sport and Fitness. Its headquarters are located in The Arena Sports Centre, Western Avenue.

== Club Values ==
Each club has a set of values that make them unique. Here are the ones that Sydney Uni SFC holds: Integrity and Respect: Sydney University SFC encourages freedom of academic and sporting discussion and accepting all ideas and expertise. Developing towards Excellence : One of their main values is Developing towards Excellence, which consists of supporting and encouraging all people around them, as they aim towards bettering the club as a whole. They also embrace diversity and accept players and coaches to join their community from all backgrounds. Welcoming and becoming Stronger Together: This value actually reiterates both of the values stated before; working as a team and accepting diversity in people and idea.
