= Associate international cricket in 2019 =

International cricket season

The 2019 Associate international cricket season was from May to August 2019. All official twenty over matches between Associate members of the ICC were eligible to have full Twenty20 International (T20I) or Women's Twenty20 International (WT20I) status, as the International Cricket Council (ICC) granted T20I status to matches between all of its members from 1 July 2018 (women's teams) and 1 January 2019 (men's teams). The season included all T20I/WT20I cricket series mostly involving ICC Associate members, that were played in addition to series covered in International cricket in 2019. More than 75% of men's T20I matches in the 2019 calendar year featured Associate teams.

== Season overview ==
International tours
Start date	Home team	Away team	Results [Matches]
Start date	Home team	Away team	T20I
11 May 2019	Belgium	Germany	0–3 [3]
24 May 2019	(Netherlands) Germany	Italy	0–2 [2]
31 May 2019	Guernsey	Jersey	0–3 [3]
4 July 2019	Qatar	Kuwait	2–1 [3]
13 July 2019	Malaysia	Nepal	0–2 [2]
13 July 2019	Denmark	Finland	2–0 [2]
17 August 2019	Finland	Spain	1–2 [3]
19 August 2019	Namibia	Botswana	4–0 [4]
International tournaments
Start date	Tournament		Winners
24 June 2019	2019 Malaysia Tri-Nation Series		Malaysia
8 July 2019	(Samoa) 2019 Pacific Games		Papua New Guinea
29 August 2019	(Romania) 2019 Continental Cup		Austria

Women's International tours
Start date	Home team	Away team	Results [Matches]	
Start date	Home team	Away team	WT20I	
31 May 2019	Guernsey	Jersey	1–0 [1]	
28 August 2019	Singapore	Malaysia	0–3 [3]	
21 August 2019	(Netherlands) Bangladesh	Thailand	2–0 [2]	
23 August 2019	Netherlands	Bangladesh	0–1 [1]	
Women's international tournaments
Start date	Tournament			Winners
18 June 2019	(Rwanda) 2019 Kwibuka T20 Tournament			Tanzania
8 July 2019	(Samoa) 2019 Pacific Games			Samoa
8 July 2019	2019 France T20I Quadrangular Series			France

== May ==
=== Germany in Belgium ===
T20I series
No.	Date	Home captain	Away captain	Venue	Result
T20I 773	11 May	Shaheryar Butt	Venkatraman Ganesan	Royal Brussels Cricket Club, Waterloo	Germany by 9 runs
T20I 774	11 May	Shaheryar Butt	Venkatraman Ganesan	Royal Brussels Cricket Club, Waterloo	Germany by 62 runs
T20I 775	12 May	Shaheryar Butt	Amith Sarma	Royal Brussels Cricket Club, Waterloo	Germany by 6 wickets

=== Germany against Italy in the Netherlands ===
T20I series
No.	Date	Germany captain	Italy captain	Venue	Result
T20I 786	25 May	Rishi Pillai	Gayashan Munasinghe	Sportpark Maarschalkerweerd, Utrecht	Italy by 7 wickets
T20I 787	25 May	Rishi Pillai	Gayashan Munasinghe	Sportpark Maarschalkerweerd, Utrecht	Italy by 6 wickets

=== Jersey women in Guernsey ===
Inter-Insular WT20I match
No.	Date	Home captain	Away captain	Venue	Result
WT20I 666	31 May	Francesca Bulpitt	Rosa Hill	College Field, Saint Peter Port	Guernsey by 7 wickets

=== Jersey in Guernsey ===
Inter-Insular T20I series
No.	Date	Home captain	Away captain	Venue	Result
T20I 788	31 May	Josh Butler	Charles Perchard	College Field, Saint Peter Port	Match tied (Jersey won S/O)
T20I 789	1 June	Josh Butler	Charles Perchard	King George V Sports Ground, Castel	Jersey by 41 runs
T20I 790	1 June	Josh Butler	Charles Perchard	King George V Sports Ground, Castel	Jersey by 76 runs

== June ==
=== 2019 Kwibuka Women's T20 Tournament ===
Team	P	W	L	T	NR	Pts	NRR
Tanzania	6	6	0	0	0	12	+4.304
Uganda	6	4	2	0	0	8	+4.178
Rwanda	6	2	4	0	0	4	+1.565
Mali	6	0	6	0	0	0	–13.314

Round-robin
No.	Date	Team 1	Captain 1	Team 2	Captain 2	Venue	Result
WT20I 667	18 June	Tanzania	Fatuma Kibasu	Uganda	Rita Musamali	Gahanga International Cricket Stadium, Kigali	Tanzania by 5 runs
WT20I 668	18 June	Mali	Youma Sangare	Rwanda	Sarah Uwera	Gahanga International Cricket Stadium, Kigali	Rwanda by 10 wickets
WT20I 669	19 June	Mali	Youma Sangare	Tanzania	Fatuma Kibasu	Gahanga International Cricket Stadium, Kigali	Tanzania by 10 wickets
WT20I 670	19 June	Uganda	Rita Musamali	Rwanda	Sarah Uwera	Gahanga International Cricket Stadium, Kigali	Uganda by 30 runs
WT20I 671	20 June	Uganda	Rita Musamali	Mali	Youma Sangare	Gahanga International Cricket Stadium, Kigali	Uganda by 304 runs
WT20I 672	20 June	Tanzania	Fatuma Kibasu	Rwanda	Sarah Uwera	Gahanga International Cricket Stadium, Kigali	Tanzania by 14 runs
WT20I 673	21 June	Rwanda	Sarah Uwera	Mali	Youma Sangare	Gahanga International Cricket Stadium, Kigali	Rwanda by 216 runs
WT20I 674	21 June	Uganda	Rita Musamali	Tanzania	Fatuma Kibasu	Gahanga International Cricket Stadium, Kigali	Tanzania by 6 wickets
WT20I 676	22 June	Tanzania	Fatuma Kibasu	Mali	Youma Sangare	Gahanga International Cricket Stadium, Kigali	Tanzania by 268 runs
WT20I 677	22 June	Rwanda	Sarah Uwera	Uganda	Rita Musamali	Gahanga International Cricket Stadium, Kigali	Uganda by 8 wickets
WT20I 678	23 June	Mali	Youma Sangare	Uganda	Rita Musamali	Gahanga International Cricket Stadium, Kigali	Uganda by 10 wickets
WT20I 679	23 June	Tanzania	Fatuma Kibasu	Rwanda	Sarah Uwera	Gahanga International Cricket Stadium, Kigali	Tanzania by 70 runs

=== 2019 Malaysia Tri-Nation Series ===
Pos	Team	Pld	W	L	T	NR	Pts	NRR
1	Malaysia (H)	4	3	0	0	1	7	2.367
2	Maldives	4	1	2	0	1	3	−1.327
3	Thailand	4	1	3	0	0	2	−0.700

(H) Host

Tri-series
No.	Date	Team 1	Captain 1	Team 2	Captain 2	Venue	Result
T20I 809	24 June	Thailand	Vichanath Singh	Malaysia	Muhamad Syahadat	Kinrara Academy Oval, Kuala Lumpur	Malaysia by 5 wickets
T20I 810	25 June	Malaysia	Muhamad Syahadat	Maldives	Mohamed Mahfooz	Kinrara Academy Oval, Kuala Lumpur	Malaysia by 73 runs
T20I 812	26 June	Thailand	Vichanath Singh	Maldives	Mohamed Mahfooz	Kinrara Academy Oval, Kuala Lumpur	Maldives by 2 wickets
T20I 813	27 June	Thailand	Vichanath Singh	Malaysia	Muhamad Syahadat	Kinrara Academy Oval, Kuala Lumpur	Malaysia by 8 wickets
T20I 814	28 June	Malaysia	Muhamad Syahadat	Maldives	Mohamed Mahfooz	Kinrara Academy Oval, Kuala Lumpur	No result
T20I 815	29 June	Maldives	Mohamed Mahfooz	Thailand	Vichanath Singh	Kinrara Academy Oval, Kuala Lumpur	Thailand by 5 wickets

== July ==
=== Kuwait in Qatar ===
T20I series
No.	Date	Home captain	Away captain	Venue	Result
T20I 816	4 July	Tamoor Sajjad	Muhammad Kashif	West End Park International Cricket Stadium, Doha	Kuwait by 7 wickets
T20I 817	5 July	Tamoor Sajjad	Muhammad Kashif	West End Park International Cricket Stadium, Doha	Match tied (Qatar won S/O)
T20I 818	6 July	Tamoor Sajjad	Muhammad Kashif	West End Park International Cricket Stadium, Doha	Qatar by 3 wickets

=== 2019 Pacific Games – Men's event ===
Team	P	W	L	T	NR	Pts	NRR
Papua New Guinea	6	6	0	0	0	12	
Vanuatu	6	3	3	0	0	6	
Samoa (H)	6	3	3	0	0	6	
New Caledonia	6	0	6	0	0	0	

(H) Host

- advanced to the gold medal match
- advanced to the bronze medal match

Round-robin
No.	Date	Team 1	Captain 1	Team 2	Captain 2	Venue	Result
T20I 819	8 July	Samoa	Dom Michael	Papua New Guinea	Assad Vala	Faleata Oval 1, Apia	Papua New Guinea by 9 wickets (DLS)
Match 2	8 July	New Caledonia		Vanuatu	Andrew Mansale	Faleata Ovals, Apia	Vanuatu by 10 wickets
T20I 820	9 July	Vanuatu	Andrew Mansale	Papua New Guinea	Assad Vala	Faleata Oval 3, Apia	Papua New Guinea by 3 wickets
Match 4	9 July	New Caledonia		Samoa	Dom Michael	Faleata Ovals, Apia	Samoa by 10 wickets
Match 5	9 July	New Caledonia		Papua New Guinea	Assad Vala	Faleata Ovals, Apia	Papua New Guinea by 6 wickets
T20I 821	9 July	Vanuatu	Andrew Mansale	Samoa	Dom Michael	Faleata Oval 1, Apia	Samoa by 2 wickets
Match 7	10 July	New Caledonia		Vanuatu	Andrew Mansale	Faleata Ovals, Apia	Vanuatu by 8 wickets
T20I 822	10 July	Samoa	Dom Michael	Papua New Guinea	Assad Vala	Faleata Oval 2, Apia	Papua New Guinea by 6 wickets
Match 9	11 July	New Caledonia		Samoa	Dom Michael	Faleata Ovals, Apia	Samoa by 8 wickets
T20I 823	12 July	Vanuatu	Andrew Mansale	Samoa	Dom Michael	Faleata Oval 3, Apia	Vanuatu by 32 runs
Match 11	12 July	New Caledonia		Papua New Guinea	Assad Vala	Faleata Oval 4, Apia	Papua New Guinea by 10 wickets
T20I 824	12 July	Papua New Guinea	Assad Vala	Vanuatu	Andrew Mansale	Faleata Oval 2, Apia	Papua New Guinea by 59 runs
Bronze medal match
Match 13	13 July	Samoa	Dom Michael	New Caledonia		Faleata Oval 1, Apia	Samoa by 157 runs
Gold medal match
T20I 826	13 July	Papua New Guinea	Assad Vala	Vanuatu	Andrew Mansale	Faleata Oval 1, Apia	Papua New Guinea by 32 runs

=== 2019 Pacific Games – Women's event ===
Team	P	W	L	T	NR	Pts	NRR
Papua New Guinea	6	5	1	0	0	10	+1.028
Samoa (H)	6	5	1	0	0	10	+0.763
Vanuatu	6	2	4	0	0	4	+0.425
Fiji	6	0	6	0	0	0	–3.065

(H) Host

- advanced to the gold medal match
- advanced to the bronze medal match

Round-robin
No.	Date	Team 1	Captain 1	Team 2	Captain 2	Venue	Result
WT20I 686	9 July	Fiji	Alicia Dean	Papua New Guinea	Kaia Arua	Faleata Oval 4, Apia	Papua New Guinea by 9 wickets
WT20I 687	9 July	Vanuatu	Rachel Andrew	Samoa	Regina Lili'i	Faleata Oval 1, Apia	Samoa by 1 wicket
WT20I 688	9 July	Papua New Guinea	Kaia Arua	Samoa	Regina Lili'i	Faleata Oval 1, Apia	Papua New Guinea by 13 runs
WT20I 689	9 July	Fiji	Alicia Dean	Vanuatu	Rachel Andrew	Faleata Oval 4, Apia	Vanuatu by 5 wickets
WT20I 690	10 July	Papua New Guinea	Kaia Arua	Vanuatu	Rachel Andrew	Faleata Oval 1, Apia	Papua New Guinea by 27 runs
WT20I 691	10 July	Fiji	Alicia Dean	Samoa	Regina Lili'i	Faleata Oval 4, Apia	Samoa by 7 wickets
WT20I 692	11 July	Fiji	Alicia Dean	Vanuatu	Rachel Andrew	Faleata Oval 1, Apia	Vanuatu by 8 wickets
WT20I 693	11 July	Papua New Guinea	Kaia Arua	Samoa	Regina Lili'i	Faleata Oval 4, Apia	Samoa by 7 wickets
WT20I 694	12 July	Fiji	Alicia Dean	Papua New Guinea	Kaia Arua	Faleata Oval 1, Apia	Papua New Guinea by 6 wickets
WT20I 695	12 July	Samoa	Regina Lili'i	Vanuatu	Rachel Andrew	Faleata Oval 4, Apia	Samoa by 17 runs
WT20I 696	12 July	Fiji	Alicia Dean	Samoa	Regina Lili'i	Faleata Oval 1, Apia	Samoa by 6 wickets
WT20I 697	12 July	Papua New Guinea	Kaia Arua	Vanuatu	Rachel Andrew	Faleata Oval 4, Apia	Papua New Guinea by 2 runs
Bronze medal match
WT20I 698	13 July	Fiji	Alicia Dean	Vanuatu	Rachel Andrew	Faleata Oval 1, Apia	Vanuatu by 8 wickets
Gold medal match
WT20I 699	13 July	Papua New Guinea	Kaia Arua	Samoa	Regina Lili'i	Faleata Oval 1, Apia	Samoa by 4 wickets

=== Nepal in Malaysia ===
T20I series
No.	Date	Home captain	Away captain	Venue	Result
T20I 827	13 July	Ahmad Faiz	Paras Khadka	Kinrara Academy Oval, Kuala Lumpur	Nepal by 7 wickets
T20I 830	14 July	Ahmad Faiz	Paras Khadka	Kinrara Academy Oval, Kuala Lumpur	Nepal by 6 runs

=== Finland in Denmark ===
T20I series
No.	Date	Home captain	Away captain	Venue	Result
T20I 828	13 July	Hamid Shah	Nathan Collins	Svanholm Park, Brøndby	Denmark by 1 run
T20I 829	13 July	Hamid Shah	Nathan Collins	Svanholm Park, Brøndby	Denmark by 38 runs

=== 2019 France Women's T20I Quadrangular Series ===
Team	P	W	L	T	NR	Pts	NRR
France (H)	6	5	1	0	0	10	+1.485
Jersey	6	4	2	0	0	8	+0.740
Austria	6	2	4	0	0	4	–0.774
Norway	6	1	5	0	0	2	–1.249

Round-robin
No.	Date	Team 1	Captain 1	Team 2	Captain 2	Venue	Result
WT20I 702	31 July	Jersey	Rosa Hill	France	Emmanuelle Brelivet	Cricket Ground, Parc du Grand Blottereau, Nantes	France by 7 wickets
WT20I 703	31 July	Norway	Razia Ali Zade	Austria	Harjot Dhaliwal	Cricket Ground, Parc du Grand Blottereau, Nantes	Norway by 16 runs
WT20I 704	31 July	Norway	Razia Ali Zade	France	Emmanuelle Brelivet	Cricket Ground, Parc du Grand Blottereau, Nantes	France by 8 wickets
WT20I 706	1 August	Austria	Andrea-Mae Zepeda	Jersey	Rosa Hill	Cricket Ground, Parc du Grand Blottereau, Nantes	Austria by 3 runs
WT20I 707	1 August	Austria	Andrea-Mae Zepeda	France	Emmanuelle Brelivet	Cricket Ground, Parc du Grand Blottereau, Nantes	France by 8 wickets
WT20I 708	1 August	Norway	Razia Ali Zade	Jersey	Rosa Hill	Cricket Ground, Parc du Grand Blottereau, Nantes	Jersey by 7 wickets
WT20I 709	2 August	Norway	Razia Ali Zade	France	Emmanuelle Brelivet	Cricket Ground, Parc du Grand Blottereau, Nantes	France by 8 wickets
WT20I 710	2 August	France	Emmanuelle Brelivet	Jersey	Rosa Hill	Cricket Ground, Parc du Grand Blottereau, Nantes	Jersey by 5 wickets
WT20I 711	2 August	Norway	Razia Ali Zade	Austria	Andrea-Mae Zepeda	Cricket Ground, Parc du Grand Blottereau, Nantes	Austria by 6 wickets
WT20I 712	3 August	Austria	Andrea-Mae Zepeda	Jersey	Rosa Hill	Cricket Ground, Parc du Grand Blottereau, Nantes	Jersey by 9 wickets
WT20I 713	3 August	Norway	Razia Ali Zade	Jersey	Rosa Hill	Cricket Ground, Parc du Grand Blottereau, Nantes	Jersey by 9 wickets
WT20I 714	3 August	Austria	Andrea-Mae Zepeda	France	Emmanuelle Brelivet	Cricket Ground, Parc du Grand Blottereau, Nantes	France by 7 wickets

== August ==
=== Spain in Finland ===
T20I series
No.	Date	Home captain	Away captain	Venue	Result
T20I 848	17 August	Nathan Collins	Christian Munoz-Mills	Kerava National Cricket Ground, Kerava	Finland by 82 runs
T20I 849	17 August	Nathan Collins	Christian Munoz-Mills	Kerava National Cricket Ground, Kerava	Spain by 6 wickets
T20I 850	18 August	Nathan Collins	Christian Munoz-Mills	Kerava National Cricket Ground, Kerava	Spain by 4 wickets

=== Botswana in Namibia ===
T20I series
No.	Date	Home captain	Away captain	Venue	Result
T20I 853	19 August	Gerhard Erasmus	Karabo Motlhanka	United Ground, Windhoek	Namibia by 93 runs
T20I 856	20 August	Gerhard Erasmus	Karabo Motlhanka	United Ground, Windhoek	Namibia by 124 runs
T20I 859	22 August	Gerhard Erasmus	Karabo Motlhanka	United Ground, Windhoek	Namibia by 78 runs
T20I 862	23 August	Gerhard Erasmus	Karabo Motlhanka	United Ground, Windhoek	Namibia by 8 wickets

=== Bangladesh women against Thailand women in the Netherlands ===
WT20I series
No.	Date	Bangladesh captain	Thailand captain	Venue	Result
WT20I 727	21 August	Salma Khatun	Sornnarin Tippoch	Sportpark Maarschalkerweerd, Utrecht	Bangladesh by 6 wickets
WT20I 729	21 August	Salma Khatun	Sornnarin Tippoch	Sportpark Maarschalkerweerd, Utrecht	Bangladesh by 3 wickets

=== Bangladesh women in the Netherlands ===
WT20I series
No.	Date	Home captain	Away captain	Venue	Result
WT20I 728	23 August	Babette de Leede	Salma Khatun	Sportpark Maarschalkerweerd, Utrecht	Bangladesh by 65 runs

=== Malaysia women in Singapore ===
Saudari Cup – WT20I series
No.	Date	Home captain	Away captain	Venue	Result
WT20I 730	28 August	Shafina Mahesh	Winifred Duraisingam	Indian Association Ground, Singapore	Malaysia by 22 runs
WT20I 731	29 August	Shafina Mahesh	Winifred Duraisingam	Indian Association Ground, Singapore	Malaysia by 9 wickets
WT20I 732	30 August	Shafina Mahesh	Winifred Duraisingam	Indian Association Ground, Singapore	Malaysia by 30 runs

=== 2019 Continental Cup ===
Team	Pld	W	L	T	NR	Pts	NRR	Status
Austria (Q)	4	3	1	0	0	6	+3.816	Advanced to the final
Czech Republic (Q)	4	3	1	0	0	6	+3.686	Advanced to the final
Romania (H)	4	3	1	0	0	6	+2.848	
Luxembourg	4	1	3	0	0	2	-1.232	
Turkey	4	0	4	0	0	0	-10.674	

(H) Host, (Q) Qualified

Round-robin
No.	Date	Team 1	Captain 1	Team 2	Captain 2	Venue	Result
T20I 867	29 August	Romania	Ramesh Satheesan	Austria	Razmal Shigiwal	Moara Vlasiei Cricket Ground, Ilfov County	Romania by 31 runs
T20I 868	29 August	Turkey	Recep Ulutuna	Luxembourg	Tony Whiteman	Moara Vlasiei Cricket Ground, Ilfov County	Luxembourg by 8 wickets
T20I 869	29 August	Romania	Ramesh Satheesan	Turkey	Recep Ulutuna	Moara Vlasiei Cricket Ground, Ilfov County	Romania by 173 runs
T20I 870	30 August	Czech Republic	Edward Knowles	Austria	Razmal Shigiwal	Moara Vlasiei Cricket Ground, Ilfov County	Austria by 8 wickets
T20I 871	30 August	Luxembourg	Tony Whiteman	Romania	Ramesh Satheesan	Moara Vlasiei Cricket Ground, Ilfov County	Romania by 7 wickets
T20I 872	30 August	Czech Republic	Edward Knowles	Turkey	Hasan Helva	Moara Vlasiei Cricket Ground, Ilfov County	Czech Republic by 257 runs
T20I 873	31 August	Austria	Anthony Lark	Luxembourg	Tony Whiteman	Moara Vlasiei Cricket Ground, Ilfov County	Austria by 135 runs
T20I 874	31 August	Romania	Ramesh Satheesan	Czech Republic	Edward Knowles	Moara Vlasiei Cricket Ground, Ilfov County	Czech Republic by 6 wickets
T20I 875	31 August	Turkey	Hasan Alta	Austria	Arsalan Arif	Moara Vlasiei Cricket Ground, Ilfov County	Austria by 10 wickets
T20I 876	1 September	Luxembourg	Tony Whiteman	Czech Republic	Edward Knowles	Moara Vlasiei Cricket Ground, Ilfov County	Czech Republic by 6 wickets
Final
T20I 877	1 September	Austria	Razmal Shigiwal	Czech Republic	Edward Knowles	Moara Vlasiei Cricket Ground, Ilfov County	Austria by 30 runs

== See also ==
- International cricket in 2019
