= International cricket in 2019 =

International cricket season

The 2019 international cricket season was from May 2019 to September 2019. The 2019 Cricket World Cup in England and Wales took place during this time, starting on 30 May 2019. 10 Test matches, 78 One Day Internationals (ODIs) and 109 Twenty20 Internationals (T20Is), as well as 1 Women's Test, 9 Women's One Day Internationals (WODIs) and 130 Women's Twenty20 Internationals (WT20Is), were played during this period. Additionally, a number of other T20I/WT20I matches were also scheduled to be played in minor series involving associate nations. The season started with India leading the Test cricket rankings, England leading the ODI rankings and Pakistan leading the Twenty20 rankings. On 3 May, the International Cricket Council (ICC) expanded the men's T20I rankings to include all current Full Member and Associate members of the ICC, featuring 80 teams. In the women's rankings, Australia women lead both the WODI and WT20I tables.

Concussion replacements were allowed to be used in all international cricket matches from 1 August 2019, after the ICC approved changes to the Playing Conditions to this effect. A concussion substitute was used for the first time in international cricket when Steve Smith was replaced by Marnus Labuschagne after being struck on the neck by a bouncer in the second Test of the Ashes.

International men's cricket started with a one-off ODI between England and Ireland, which England won. The 2019 Cricket World Cup was held in England, starting in May. England won their first World Cup, beating New Zealand in a Super Over, after the final finished in a tie. Following the World Cup, the 71st Ashes series was played in this season. The Ashes Tests were the first Test matches in the inaugural 2019–2021 ICC World Test Championship. Australia retained the Ashes, after winning the fourth Test of the series. The series was drawn 2–2, the first drawn Ashes series since 1972.

In the one-off test between England and Ireland, Ireland were bowled out for 38 in their second innings. This was the seventh lowest innings total in Test history, and the lowest since England bowled New Zealand out for 26 in 1955. In the third Test of the Ashes, England were bowled out for 67 in their first innings and went on to win the Test; this is the first time since 1887 that a team has been bowled out for less than 70 in their first innings and went on to win the match.

The 2019 Romania T20 Cup saw several records set in men's T20Is. The match between Czech Republic and Turkey saw the Czech Republic equal the record for the highest innings total in T20Is (278), Turkey bowled out for the lowest total in T20Is (21), and the largest margin of defeat in terms of runs (257).

In addition, several qualification events for the 2020 ICC T20 World Cup took place in this season. In the Africa qualifier, both Namibia and Kenya progressed to the 2019 ICC T20 World Cup Qualifier tournament. Jersey progressed from the Europe qualifier tournament and Singapore progressed from the Asia qualifier tournament. In the final qualifier tournament was the Americas group, which saw Canada and Bermuda progress. Qualification started for the 2023 Cricket World Cup this season, with the Scotland Tri-Nation Series kicking off Cricket World Cup League 2.

In July 2019, the ICC suspended Zimbabwe Cricket, for breach of the ICC Constitution, with the team barred from taking part in ICC events. It was the first time that a Full Member of the ICC had been suspended. As a result of Zimbabwe's suspension, the ICC replaced them in the 2019 ICC T20 World Cup Qualifier with Nigeria and the 2019 ICC Women's World Twenty20 Qualifier tournament with Namibia. In addition, the ICC suspended the Croatian Cricket Federation and the Zambia Cricket Union for non-compliance issues, and expelled the Royal Moroccan Cricket Federation as they continued to remain non-compliant with the ICC Membership Criteria.

Women's cricket in this season saw the conclusion of qualification for the 2020 ICC Women's T20 World Cup, with many of these events also being part of the 2021 Women's Cricket World Cup qualification process. Regional qualification groups saw teams progress to both the 2019 ICC Women's World Twenty20 Qualifier and 2020 Women's Cricket World Cup Qualifier tournaments. Zimbabwe initially qualified from the Africa group, before being replaced by Namibia. Papua New Guinea qualified from the EAP group, the United States qualified from the Americas group and the Netherlands qualified from the Europe group. The 2019 ICC Women's World Twenty20 Qualifier also took place during the season. Bangladesh and Thailand reached the final of the Qualifier to progress to the 2020 ICC Women's T20 World Cup. It was the first time that Thailand had qualified for a Women's T20 World Cup tournament. Bangladesh beat Thailand in the final of the Qualifier to win the tournament.

The 2019 Kwibuka Women's T20 Tournament saw several records set. Mali scored four of the five lowest innings totals in WT20Is, the lowest of which was six. In addition, the two highest innings totals in WT20Is was also set this tournament, with Uganda's 314/2 being the highest. In addition, four bilateral series were played, including the 23rd Women's Ashes, which was won by Australia.

== Season overview ==
Men's international tours
Start date	Home team	Away team	Results [Matches]		
Start date	Home team	Away team	Test	ODI	T20I
3 May 2019	Ireland	England	—	0–1 [1]	—
5 May 2019	England	Pakistan	—	4–0 [5]	1–0 [1]
8 May 2019	Scotland	Afghanistan	—	0–1 [2]	—
18 May 2019	Scotland	Sri Lanka	—	0–1 [2]	—
19 May 2019	Ireland	Afghanistan	—	1–1 [2]	—
19 June 2019	Netherlands	Zimbabwe	—	2–0 [2]	1–1 [2]
1 July 2019	Ireland	Zimbabwe	—	3–0 [3]	1–1 [3]
24 July 2019	England	Ireland	1–0 [1]	—	—
26 July 2019	Sri Lanka	Bangladesh	—	3–0 [3]	—
1 August 2019	England	Australia	2–2 [5]	—	—
3 August 2019	Netherlands	United Arab Emirates	—	—	0–4 [4]
3 August 2019	(United States) West Indies	India	0–2 [2]	0–2 [3]	0–3 [3]
14 August 2019	Sri Lanka	New Zealand	1–1 [2]	—	1–2 [3]
August 2019 (Note: Zimbabwe were scheduled to play Afghanistan in August 2019, but the tour did not take place.)	Zimbabwe	Afghanistan	[1]	[5]	[3]
Men's international tournaments
Start date	Tournament			Winners	
5 May 2019	2019 Ireland Tri-Nation Series			Bangladesh	
20 May 2019	(Uganda) 2019 ICC T20 World Cup Africa Qualifier			Namibia	
30 May 2019	(England) (Wales) 2019 ICC Cricket World Cup			England	
15 June 2019	(Guernsey) 2019 ICC T20 World Cup Europe Qualifier			Jersey	
22 July 2019	(Singapore) 2019 ICC T20 World Cup Asia Qualifier			Singapore	
14 August 2019	2019 Scotland Tri-Nation Series			—N/a	
18 August 2019	(Bermuda) 2019 ICC T20 World Cup Americas Qualifier			Canada	

Women's international tours
Start date	Home team	Away team	Results [Matches]		
Start date	Home team	Away team	WTest	WODI	WT20I
6 May 2019	South Africa	Pakistan	—	1–1 [3]	3–2 [5]
26 May 2019	Ireland	West Indies	—	—	0–3 [3]
6 June 2019	England	West Indies	—	3–0 [3]	1–0 [3]
2 July 2019	England	Australia	0–0 [1]	0–3 [3]	1–2 [3]
10 July 2019 (Note: Zimbabwe Women were scheduled to tour Ireland in June 2019, but the tour did not take place.)	Ireland	Zimbabwe	—	—	[3]
Women's international tournaments
Start date	Tournament			Winners	
5 May 2019	(Zimbabwe) 2019 ICC Women's Qualifier Africa			Zimbabwe	
6 May 2019	(Vanuatu) 2019 ICC Women's Qualifier EAP			Papua New Guinea	
17 May 2019	(United States) 2019 ICC Women's Qualifier Americas			United States	
26 June 2019	(Spain) 2019 ICC Women's Qualifier Europe			Netherlands	
8 August 2019	2019 Netherlands Women's Quadrangular Series			Thailand	
31 August 2019	(Scotland) 2019 ICC Women's World Twenty20 Qualifier			Bangladesh	

== Rankings ==
The following were the rankings at the beginning of the season.

ICC Men's Test Team Rankings 3 May 2019
Rank	Team	Matches	Points	Rating
1	India	32	3,631	113
2	New Zealand	23	2,547	111
3	South Africa	27	2,917	108
4	England	35	3,663	105
5	Australia	27	2,640	98
6	Sri Lanka	37	3,462	94
7	Pakistan	27	2,263	84
8	West Indies	29	2,381	82
9	Bangladesh	25	1,898	65
10	Zimbabwe	9	140	16

ICC Men's ODI Team Rankings 3 May 2019
Rank	Team	Matches	Points	Rating
1	England	38	4,659	123
2	India	47	5,669	121
3	South Africa	39	4,488	115
4	New Zealand	33	3,729	113
5	Australia	40	4,342	109
6	Pakistan	37	3,552	96
7	Bangladesh	31	2,667	86
8	West Indies	34	2,719	80
9	Sri Lanka	43	3,266	76
10	Afghanistan	28	1,780	64
11	Zimbabwe	30	1,609	54
12	Ireland	20	921	46
13	Scotland	9	359	40
14	Nepal	8	152	19
15	United Arab Emirates	15	144	10
16	Papua New Guinea	9	50	6

ICC Men's T20I Team Rankings 3 May 2019
Rank	Team	Matches	Points	Rating
1	Pakistan	25	7154	286
2	South Africa	16	4196	262
3	England	15	3917	261
4	Australia	21	5471	261
5	India	28	7273	260
6	New Zealand	16	4056	254
7	Afghanistan	16	3849	241
8	Sri Lanka	18	4093	227
9	West Indies	21	4747	226
10	Bangladesh	16	3525	220
11	Nepal	8	1698	212
12	Scotland	11	2185	199
13	Zimbabwe	9	1730	192
14	Netherlands	9	1686	187
15	Ireland	19	3455	182
16	United Arab Emirates	14	2527	181
Only the top 16 teams are shown

ICC Women's ODI Rankings 24 March 2019
Rank	Team	Matches	Points	Rating
1	Australia	25	3602	144
2	England	30	3673	122
3	India	33	4018	122
4	New Zealand	33	3714	113
5	South Africa	39	3864	99
6	West Indies	22	1921	87
7	Pakistan	26	1978	76
8	Sri Lanka	29	1617	56
9	Bangladesh	13	632	49
10	Ireland	10	211	21

ICC Women's T20I Rankings 1 May 2019
Rank	Team	Matches	Points	Rating
1	Australia	28	7,937	283
2	England	30	8,332	278
3	New Zealand	32	8,837	276
4	West Indies	27	7,044	261
5	India	38	9,504	250
6	South Africa	28	6,824	244
7	Pakistan	34	7,713	227
8	Sri Lanka	31	6,373	206
9	Bangladesh	31	5,913	191
10	Ireland	17	3,153	185
11	Zimbabwe	23	3,518	153
12	Thailand	40	6,044	151
13	Scotland	8	1,199	150
14	Nepal	19	2,425	128
15	Uganda	25	3,166	127
16	United Arab Emirates	27	3,381	125
Only the top 16 teams are shown

== May ==
=== England in Ireland ===
Only ODI
No.	Date	Home captain	Away captain	Venue	Result
ODI 4127	3 May	William Porterfield	Eoin Morgan	The Village, Dublin	England by 4 wickets

=== 2019 Ireland Tri-Nation Series ===
Pos	Team	Pld	W	L	T	NR	BP	Pts	NRR
1	Bangladesh	4	3	0	0	1	0	14	0.622
2	West Indies	4	2	2	0	0	1	9	0.843
3	Ireland (H)	4	0	3	0	1	0	2	−1.783

(H) Host

Tri-series
No.	Date	Team 1	Captain 1	Team 2	Captain 2	Venue	Result
ODI 4128	5 May	Ireland	William Porterfield	West Indies	Jason Holder	Clontarf Cricket Club Ground, Clontarf	West Indies by 196 runs
ODI 4129	7 May	West Indies	Jason Holder	Bangladesh	Mashrafe Mortaza	Clontarf Cricket Club Ground, Clontarf	Bangladesh by 8 wickets
ODI 4130a	9 May	Ireland	William Porterfield	Bangladesh	Mashrafe Mortaza	The Village, Dublin	Match abandoned
ODI 4132	11 May	Ireland	William Porterfield	West Indies	Jason Holder	The Village, Dublin	West Indies by 5 wickets
ODI 4134	13 May	West Indies	Jason Holder	Bangladesh	Mashrafe Mortaza	The Village, Dublin	Bangladesh by 5 wickets
ODI 4136	15 May	Ireland	William Porterfield	Bangladesh	Mashrafe Mortaza	Clontarf Cricket Club Ground, Clontarf	Bangladesh by 6 wickets
Final
ODI 4137	17 May	West Indies	Jason Holder	Bangladesh	Mashrafe Mortaza	The Village, Dublin	Bangladesh by 5 wickets (DLS)

=== Pakistan in England ===
Only T20I
No.	Date	Home captain	Away captain	Venue	Result
T20I 772	5 May	Eoin Morgan	Sarfaraz Ahmed	Sophia Gardens, Cardiff	England by 7 wickets
ODI series
No.	Date	Home captain	Away captain	Venue	Result
ODI 4130	8 May	Eoin Morgan	Sarfaraz Ahmed	The Oval, London	No result
ODI 4133	11 May	Eoin Morgan	Sarfaraz Ahmed	Rose Bowl, Southampton	England by 12 runs
ODI 4135	14 May	Eoin Morgan	Sarfaraz Ahmed	County Ground, Bristol	England by 6 wickets
ODI 4138	17 May	Jos Buttler	Sarfaraz Ahmed	Trent Bridge, Nottingham	England by 3 wickets
ODI 4140	19 May	Eoin Morgan	Sarfaraz Ahmed	Headingley, Leeds	England by 54 runs

=== 2019 ICC Women's Qualifier Africa ===
Pos	Team	Pld	W	L	T	NR	Pts	NRR	
1	Zimbabwe (H)	4	4	0	0	0	8	5.899	Advanced to Final
2	Tanzania	4	3	1	0	0	6	1.575	Eliminated
3	Rwanda	4	2	2	0	0	4	−0.995	Eliminated
4	Nigeria	4	1	3	0	0	2	−2.715	Eliminated
5	Mozambique	4	0	4	0	0	0	−3.817	Eliminated

(H) Host

Pos	Team	Pld	W	L	T	NR	Pts	NRR	
1	Namibia	3	3	0	0	0	6	1.650	Advanced to Final
2	Uganda	3	2	1	0	0	4	1.333	Eliminated
3	Kenya	3	1	2	0	0	2	1.050	Eliminated
4	Sierra Leone	3	0	3	0	0	0	−4.231	Eliminated

Round-robin
No.	Date	Team 1	Captain 1	Team 2	Captain 2	Venue	Result
WT20I 623	5 May	Namibia	Yasmeen Khan	Kenya	Margaret Ngoche	Takashinga Cricket Club, Harare	Namibia by 39 runs
WT20I 624	5 May	Zimbabwe	Mary-Anne Musonda	Mozambique	Palmira Cuinica	Old Hararians Sports Club, Harare	Zimbabwe by 163 runs
WT20I 625	5 May	Nigeria	Blessing Etim	Rwanda	Sarah Uwera	Takashinga Cricket Club, Harare	Rwanda by 37 runs
WT20I 626	5 May	Uganda	Kevin Awino	Sierra Leone	Linda Bull	Old Hararians Sports Club, Harare	Uganda by 90 runs
WT20I 631	6 May	Kenya	Margaret Ngoche	Sierra Leone	Linda Bull	Takashinga Cricket Club, Harare	Kenya by 106 runs
WT20I 632	6 May	Mozambique	Palmira Cuinica	Nigeria	Blessing Etim	Old Hararians Sports Club, Harare	Nigeria by 8 wickets
WT20I 633	6 May	Uganda	Kevin Awino	Namibia	Yasmeen Khan	Old Hararians Sports Club, Harare	Namibia by 14 runs
WT20I 634	6 May	Tanzania	Fatuma Kibasu	Zimbabwe	Mary-Anne Musonda	Takashinga Cricket Club, Harare	Zimbabwe by 92 runs
WT20I 639	8 May	Mozambique	Palmira Cuinica	Rwanda	Sarah Uwera	Old Hararians Sports Club, Harare	Rwanda by 1 wicket
WT20I 640	8 May	Nigeria	Blessing Etim	Tanzania	Fatuma Kibasu	Takashinga Cricket Club, Harare	Tanzania by 86 runs
WT20I 641	8 May	Kenya	Margaret Ngoche	Uganda	Kevin Awino	Old Hararians Sports Club, Harare	Uganda by 4 runs
WT20I 642	8 May	Sierra Leone	Linda Bull	Namibia	Yasmeen Khan	Takashinga Cricket Club, Harare	Namibia by 10 wickets
WT20I 647	9 May	Tanzania	Fatuma Kibasu	Mozambique	Eulalia Moiane	Takashinga Cricket Club, Harare	Tanzania by 10 wickets
WT20I 648	9 May	Rwanda	Sarah Uwera	Zimbabwe	Mary-Anne Musonda	Old Hararians Sports Club, Harare	Zimbabwe by 82 runs
WT20I 652	11 May	Rwanda	Sarah Uwera	Tanzania	Fatuma Kibasu	Takashinga Cricket Club, Harare	Tanzania by 38 runs
WT20I 653	11 May	Zimbabwe	Mary-Anne Musonda	Nigeria	Blessing Etim	Old Hararians Sports Club, Harare	Zimbabwe by 10 wickets
Final
WT20I 654	12 May	Zimbabwe	Mary-Anne Musonda	Namibia	Yasmeen Khan	Harare Sports Club, Harare	Zimbabwe by 50 runs

=== 2019 ICC Women's Qualifier EAP ===
Pos	Team	Pld	W	L	T	NR	Pts	NRR	
1	Papua New Guinea	5	5	0	0	0	10	2.954	Advanced to qualifying tournament
2	Samoa	5	4	1	0	0	8	1.219	Eliminated
3	Vanuatu (H)	5	3	2	0	0	6	0.216	Eliminated
4	Indonesia	5	2	3	0	0	4	0.140	Eliminated
5	Japan	5	1	4	0	0	2	−1.296	Eliminated
6	Fiji	5	0	5	0	0	0	−4.052	Eliminated

(H) Host

Round-robin
No.	Date	Team 1	Captain 1	Team 2	Captain 2	Venue	Result
WT20I 627	6 May	Vanuatu	Selina Solman	Papua New Guinea	Kaia Arua	Independence Park Ground 1, Port Vila	Papua New Guinea by 57 runs
WT20I 628	6 May	Japan	Mai Yanagida	Indonesia	Puji Haryanti	Independence Park Ground 2, Port Vila	Indonesia by 7 wickets
WT20I 629	6 May	Papua New Guinea	Kaia Arua	Indonesia	Puji Haryanti	Independence Park Ground 1, Port Vila	Papua New Guinea by 7 wickets
WT20I 630	6 May	Samoa	Regina Lili'i	Fiji	Ruci Muriyalo	Independence Park Ground 2, Port Vila	Samoa by 9 wickets
WT20I 635	7 May	Samoa	Regina Lili'i	Japan	Mai Yanagida	Independence Park Ground 1, Port Vila	Samoa by 9 wickets
WT20I 636	7 May	Papua New Guinea	Kaia Arua	Fiji	Ruci Muriyalo	Independence Park Ground 2, Port Vila	Papua New Guinea by 10 wickets
WT20I 637	7 May	Indonesia	Puji Haryanti	Samoa	Regina Lili'i	Independence Park Ground 1, Port Vila	Samoa by 9 wickets (DLS)
WT20I 638	7 May	Vanuatu	Selina Solman	Fiji	Ruci Muriyalo	Independence Park Ground 2, Port Vila	Vanuatu by 63 runs (DLS)
WT20I 643	9 May	Vanuatu	Selina Solman	Samoa	Regina Lili'i	Independence Park Ground 1, Port Vila	Samoa by 8 wickets
WT20I 644	9 May	Fiji	Ruci Muriyalo	Japan	Mai Yanagida	Independence Park Ground 2, Port Vila	Japan by 31 runs
WT20I 645	9 May	Papua New Guinea	Kaia Arua	Japan	Mai Yanagida	Independence Park Ground 1, Port Vila	Papua New Guinea by 10 wickets
WT20I 646	9 May	Indonesia	Puji Haryanti	Vanuatu	Selina Solman	Independence Park Ground 2, Port Vila	Vanuatu by 4 wickets
WT20I 649	10 May	Indonesia	Puji Haryanti	Fiji	Ruci Muriyalo	Independence Park Ground 1, Port Vila	Indonesia by 8 wickets
WT20I 650	10 May	Japan	Mai Yanagida	Vanuatu	Selina Solman	Independence Park Ground 2, Port Vila	Vanuatu by 9 wickets
WT20I 651	10 May	Samoa	Regina Lili'i	Papua New Guinea	Kaia Arua	Independence Park Ground 1, Port Vila	Papua New Guinea by 7 wickets

=== Pakistan women in South Africa ===
2017–20 ICC Women's Championship – WODI series
No.	Date	Home captain	Away captain	Venue	Result
WODI 1152	6 May	Suné Luus	Bismah Maroof	Senwes Park, Potchefstroom	Pakistan by 8 wickets
WODI 1153	9 May	Suné Luus	Bismah Maroof	Senwes Park, Potchefstroom	South Africa by 8 wickets
WODI 1154	12 May	Suné Luus	Bismah Maroof	Willowmoore Park, Benoni	Match tied
WT20I series
No.	Date	Home captain	Away captain	Venue	Result
WT20I 655	15 May	Suné Luus	Bismah Maroof	Tuks Oval, Pretoria	Pakistan by 7 wickets
WT20I 657	18 May	Suné Luus	Bismah Maroof	Pietermaritzburg Oval, Pietermaritzburg	South Africa by 8 wickets
WT20I 659	19 May	Suné Luus	Bismah Maroof	Pietermaritzburg Oval, Pietermaritzburg	Pakistan by 4 wickets
WT20I 661	22 May	Suné Luus	Bismah Maroof	Willowmoore Park, Benoni	South Africa by 4 wickets
WT20I 662	23 May	Suné Luus	Bismah Maroof	Willowmoore Park, Benoni	South Africa by 9 wickets

=== Afghanistan in Scotland ===
ODI series
No.	Date	Home captain	Away captain	Venue	Result
ODI 4129a	8 May	Kyle Coetzer	Gulbadin Naib	The Grange Club, Edinburgh	Match abandoned
ODI 4131	10 May	Kyle Coetzer	Gulbadin Naib	The Grange Club, Edinburgh	Afghanistan by 2 runs (DLS)

=== 2019 ICC Women's Qualifier Americas ===
Pos	Team	Pld	W	L	T	NR	Pts	NRR	
1	United States (H)	3	3	0	0	0	6	2.203	Advanced to qualifying tournament
2	Canada	3	0	3	0	0	0	−2.203	Eliminated

(H) Host

Round-robin
No.	Date	Team 1	Captain 1	Team 2	Captain 2	Venue	Result
WT20I 656	17 May	United States	Sindhu Sriharsha	Canada	Mahewish Khan	Central Broward Regional Park, Lauderhill	United States by 10 wickets
WT20I 658	18 May	United States	Sindhu Sriharsha	Canada	Mahewish Khan	Central Broward Regional Park, Lauderhill	United States by 37 runs
WT20I 660	19 May	United States	Sindhu Sriharsha	Canada	Mahewish Khan	Central Broward Regional Park, Lauderhill	United States by 35 runs

=== Sri Lanka in Scotland ===
ODI series
No.	Date	Home captain	Away captain	Venue	Result
ODI 4138a	18 May	Kyle Coetzer	Dimuth Karunaratne	The Grange Club, Edinburgh	Match abandoned
ODI 4142	21 May	Kyle Coetzer	Dimuth Karunaratne	The Grange Club, Edinburgh	Sri Lanka by 35 runs (DLS)

=== Afghanistan in Ireland ===
ODI series
No.	Date	Home captain	Away captain	Venue	Result
ODI 4139	19 May	William Porterfield	Gulbadin Naib	Stormont Cricket Ground, Belfast	Ireland by 72 runs
ODI 4141	21 May	William Porterfield	Gulbadin Naib	Stormont Cricket Ground, Belfast	Afghanistan by 126 runs

=== 2019 ICC T20 World Cup Africa Qualifier ===
Pos	Team	Pld	W	L	T	NR	Pts	NRR	
1	Namibia	5	3	0	0	2	8	4.547	Qualify to 2019 T20 World Cup Qualifier
2	Kenya	5	3	0	0	2	8	1.363	Qualify to 2019 T20 World Cup Qualifier
3	Nigeria	5	2	1	0	2	6	0.394	Qualify to 2019 T20 World Cup Qualifier
4	Uganda (H)	5	2	2	0	1	5	0.587	
5	Botswana	5	0	3	0	2	2	−3.028	
6	Ghana	5	0	4	0	1	1	−2.361	

(H) Host

Round-robin
No.	Date	Team 1	Captain 1	Team 2	Captain 2	Venue	Result
T20I 776	20 May	Kenya	Shem Ngoche	Nigeria	Ademola Onikoyi	Kyambogo Cricket Oval, Kampala	Kenya by 8 wickets
T20I 777	20 May	Ghana	Isaac Aboagye	Namibia	Gerhard Erasmus	Kyambogo Cricket Oval, Kampala	Namibia by 9 wickets
T20I 778	20 May	Uganda	Roger Mukasa	Botswana	Karabo Motlhanka	Lugogo Stadium, Kampala	Uganda by 52 runs
T20I 779	21 May	Namibia	Gerhard Erasmus	Uganda	Roger Mukasa	Kyambogo Cricket Oval, Kampala	Namibia by 42 runs
T20I 780	21 May	Botswana	Karabo Motlhanka	Nigeria	Ademola Onikoyi	Lugogo Stadium, Kampala	Nigeria by 11 runs
T20I 781	21 May	Kenya	Shem Ngoche	Ghana	Isaac Aboagye	Kyambogo Cricket Oval, Kampala	Kenya by 53 runs
T20I 782	22 May	Nigeria	Ademola Onikoyi	Ghana	Isaac Aboagye	Kyambogo Cricket Oval, Kampala	Nigeria by 28 runs
T20I 783	22 May	Namibia	Gerhard Erasmus	Botswana	Karabo Motlhanka	Kyambogo Cricket Oval, Kampala	Namibia by 10 wickets
T20I 784	22 May	Uganda	Roger Mukasa	Kenya	Shem Ngoche	Lugogo Stadium, Kampala	Kenya by 1 run
T20I 784a	23 May	Botswana	Karabo Motlhanka	Kenya	Shem Ngoche	Kyambogo Cricket Oval, Kampala	Match abandoned
T20I 784b	23 May	Nigeria	Ademola Onikoyi	Namibia	Gerhard Erasmus	Lugogo Stadium, Kampala	Match abandoned
T20I 785	23 May	Uganda	Roger Mukasa	Ghana	Isaac Aboagye	Kyambogo Cricket Oval, Kampala	Uganda by 7 wickets
T20I 785a	24 May	Ghana	Isaac Aboagye	Botswana	Karabo Motlhanka	Kyambogo Cricket Oval, Kampala	Match abandoned
T20I 785b	24 May	Namibia	Gerhard Erasmus	Kenya	Shem Ngoche	Kyambogo Cricket Oval, Kampala	Match abandoned
T20I 785c	24 May	Nigeria	Ademola Onikoyi	Uganda	Roger Mukasa	Lugogo Stadium, Kampala	Match abandoned

=== West Indies women in Ireland ===
WT20I series
No.	Date	Home captain	Away captain	Venue	Result
WT20I 663	26 May	Laura Delany	Stafanie Taylor	YMCA Cricket Club, Dublin	West Indies by 64 runs
WT20I 664	28 May	Kim Garth	Stafanie Taylor	Sydney Parade, Dublin	West Indies by 45 runs
WT20I 665	29 May	Kim Garth	Stafanie Taylor	Sydney Parade, Dublin	West Indies by 72 runs

=== 2019 Cricket World Cup ===
Pos	Team	Pld	W	L	T	NR	Pts	NRR	Qualification
1	India	9	7	1	0	1	15	0.809	Advanced to semi-finals
2	Australia	9	7	2	0	0	14	0.868	Advanced to semi-finals
3	England (H)	9	6	3	0	0	12	1.152	Advanced to semi-finals
4	New Zealand	9	5	3	0	1	11	0.175	Advanced to semi-finals
5	Pakistan	9	5	3	0	1	11	−0.430	Eliminated
6	Sri Lanka	9	3	4	0	2	8	−0.919	Eliminated
7	South Africa	9	3	5	0	1	7	−0.030	Eliminated
8	Bangladesh	9	3	5	0	1	7	−0.410	Eliminated
9	West Indies	9	2	6	0	1	5	−0.225	Eliminated
10	Afghanistan	9	0	9	0	0	0	−1.322	Eliminated

Source: ICC, ESPNcricinfo
Rules for classification: 1) Points; 2) Wins; 3) Net run rate; 4) Results of games between tied teams; 5) Pre-tournament seeding
(H) Host

2019 Cricket World Cup
No.	Date	Team 1	Captain 1	Team 2	Captain 2	Venue	Result
ODI 4143	30 May	England	Eoin Morgan	South Africa	Faf du Plessis	The Oval, London	England by 104 runs
ODI 4144	31 May	Pakistan	Sarfaraz Ahmed	West Indies	Jason Holder	Trent Bridge, Nottingham	West Indies by 7 wickets
ODI 4145	1 June	New Zealand	Kane Williamson	Sri Lanka	Dimuth Karunaratne	Sophia Gardens, Cardiff	New Zealand by 10 wickets
ODI 4146	1 June	Australia	Aaron Finch	Afghanistan	Gulbadin Naib	County Ground, Bristol	Australia by 7 wickets
ODI 4147	2 June	Bangladesh	Mashrafe Mortaza	South Africa	Faf du Plessis	The Oval, London	Bangladesh by 21 runs
ODI 4148	3 June	England	Eoin Morgan	Pakistan	Sarfaraz Ahmed	Trent Bridge, Nottingham	Pakistan by 14 runs
ODI 4149	4 June	Afghanistan	Gulbadin Naib	Sri Lanka	Dimuth Karunaratne	Sophia Gardens, Cardiff	Sri Lanka by 34 runs (DLS)
ODI 4150	5 June	India	Virat Kohli	South Africa	Faf du Plessis	Rose Bowl, Southampton	India by 6 wickets
ODI 4151	5 June	Bangladesh	Mashrafe Mortaza	New Zealand	Kane Williamson	The Oval, London	New Zealand by 2 wickets
ODI 4152	6 June	Australia	Aaron Finch	West Indies	Jason Holder	Trent Bridge, Nottingham	Australia by 15 runs
ODI 4152a	7 June	Pakistan	Sarfaraz Ahmed	Sri Lanka	Dimuth Karunaratne	County Ground, Bristol	Match abandoned
ODI 4153	8 June	England	Eoin Morgan	Bangladesh	Mashrafe Mortaza	Sophia Gardens, Cardiff	England by 106 runs
ODI 4154	8 June	Afghanistan	Gulbadin Naib	New Zealand	Kane Williamson	County Ground, Taunton	New Zealand by 7 wickets
ODI 4155	9 June	Australia	Aaron Finch	India	Virat Kohli	The Oval, London	India by 36 runs
ODI 4156	10 June	South Africa	Faf du Plessis	West Indies	Jason Holder	Rose Bowl, Southampton	No result
ODI 4156a	11 June	Bangladesh	Mashrafe Mortaza	Sri Lanka	Dimuth Karunaratne	County Ground, Bristol	Match abandoned
ODI 4157	12 June	Australia	Aaron Finch	Pakistan	Sarfaraz Ahmed	County Ground, Taunton	Australia by 41 runs
ODI 4157a	13 June	India	Virat Kohli	New Zealand	Kane Williamson	Trent Bridge, Nottingham	Match abandoned
ODI 4158	14 June	England	Eoin Morgan	West Indies	Jason Holder	Rose Bowl, Southampton	England by 8 wickets
ODI 4159	15 June	Australia	Aaron Finch	Sri Lanka	Dimuth Karunaratne	The Oval, London	Australia by 87 runs
ODI 4160	15 June	Afghanistan	Gulbadin Naib	South Africa	Faf du Plessis	Sophia Gardens, Cardiff	South Africa by 9 wickets (DLS)
ODI 4161	16 June	India	Virat Kohli	Pakistan	Sarfaraz Ahmed	Old Trafford, Manchester	India by 89 runs (DLS)
ODI 4162	17 June	Bangladesh	Mashrafe Mortaza	West Indies	Jason Holder	County Ground, Taunton	Bangladesh by 7 wickets
ODI 4163	18 June	England	Eoin Morgan	Afghanistan	Gulbadin Naib	Old Trafford, Manchester	England by 150 runs
ODI 4165	19 June	New Zealand	Kane Williamson	South Africa	Faf du Plessis	Edgbaston, Birmingham	New Zealand by 4 wickets
ODI 4166	20 June	Australia	Aaron Finch	Bangladesh	Mashrafe Mortaza	Trent Bridge, Nottingham	Australia by 48 runs
ODI 4168	21 June	England	Eoin Morgan	Sri Lanka	Dimuth Karunaratne	Headingley, Leeds	Sri Lanka by 20 runs
ODI 4169	22 June	Afghanistan	Gulbadin Naib	India	Virat Kohli	Rose Bowl, Southampton	India by 11 runs
ODI 4170	22 June	New Zealand	Kane Williamson	West Indies	Jason Holder	Old Trafford, Manchester	New Zealand by 5 runs
ODI 4171	23 June	Pakistan	Sarfaraz Ahmed	South Africa	Faf du Plessis	Lord's, London	Pakistan by 49 runs
ODI 4172	24 June	Afghanistan	Gulbadin Naib	Bangladesh	Mashrafe Mortaza	Rose Bowl, Southampton	Bangladesh by 62 runs
ODI 4173	25 June	England	Eoin Morgan	Australia	Aaron Finch	Lord's, London	Australia by 64 runs
ODI 4174	26 June	New Zealand	Kane Williamson	Pakistan	Sarfaraz Ahmed	Edgbaston, Birmingham	Pakistan by 6 wickets
ODI 4175	27 June	India	Virat Kohli	West Indies	Jason Holder	Old Trafford, Manchester	India by 125 runs
ODI 4176	28 June	South Africa	Faf du Plessis	Sri Lanka	Dimuth Karunaratne	Riverside Ground, Chester-le-Street	South Africa by 9 wickets
ODI 4177	29 June	Afghanistan	Gulbadin Naib	Pakistan	Sarfaraz Ahmed	Headingley, Leeds	Pakistan by 3 wickets
ODI 4178	29 June	Australia	Aaron Finch	New Zealand	Kane Williamson	Lord's, London	Australia by 86 runs
ODI 4179	30 June	England	Eoin Morgan	India	Virat Kohli	Edgbaston, Birmingham	England by 31 runs
ODI 4180	1 July	Sri Lanka	Dimuth Karunaratne	West Indies	Jason Holder	Riverside Ground, Chester-le-Street	Sri Lanka by 23 runs
ODI 4182	2 July	Bangladesh	Mashrafe Mortaza	India	Virat Kohli	Edgbaston, Birmingham	India by 28 runs
ODI 4183	3 July	England	Eoin Morgan	New Zealand	Kane Williamson	Riverside Ground, Chester-le-Street	England by 119 runs
ODI 4184	4 July	Afghanistan	Gulbadin Naib	West Indies	Jason Holder	Headingley, Leeds	West Indies by 23 runs
ODI 4186	5 July	Bangladesh	Mashrafe Mortaza	Pakistan	Sarfaraz Ahmed	Lord's, London	Pakistan by 94 runs
ODI 4187	6 July	India	Virat Kohli	Sri Lanka	Dimuth Karunaratne	Headingley, Leeds	India by 7 wickets
ODI 4188	6 July	Australia	Aaron Finch	South Africa	Faf du Plessis	Old Trafford, Manchester	South Africa by 10 runs
Semi-finals
ODI 4190	9–10 July	India	Virat Kohli	New Zealand	Kane Williamson	Old Trafford, Manchester	New Zealand by 18 runs
ODI 4191	11 July	Australia	Aaron Finch	England	Eoin Morgan	Edgbaston, Birmingham	England by 8 wickets
Final
ODI 4192	14 July	New Zealand	Kane Williamson	England	Eoin Morgan	Lord's, London	Match & S/O tied (England won on boundary count)

== June ==
=== West Indies women in England ===
2017–20 ICC Women's Championship – WODI series
No.	Date	Home captain	Away captain	Venue	Result
WODI 1155	6 June	Heather Knight	Stafanie Taylor	Grace Road, Leicester	England by 208 runs
WODI 1156	9 June	Heather Knight	Stafanie Taylor	New Road, Worcester	England by 121 runs (DLS)
WODI 1157	13 June	Heather Knight	Stafanie Taylor	County Cricket Ground, Chelmsford	England by 135 runs (DLS)
WT20I series
No.	Date	Home captain	Away captain	Venue	Result
WT20I 668a	18 June	Heather Knight	Stafanie Taylor	County Cricket Ground, Northampton	Match abandoned
WT20I 675	21 June	Heather Knight	Stafanie Taylor	County Cricket Ground, Northampton	England by 42 runs
WT20I 679a	25 June	Heather Knight	Stafanie Taylor	County Cricket Ground, Derby	Match abandoned

=== 2019 ICC T20 World Cup Europe Qualifier ===
Pos	Team	Pld	W	L	T	NR	Pts	NRR	
1	Jersey	5	4	1	0	0	8	1.802	Qualify to 2019 Men's T20 World Cup Qualifier
2	Germany	5	4	1	0	0	8	1.749	
3	Italy	5	3	2	0	0	6	−0.687	
4	Denmark	5	2	3	0	0	4	0.171	
5	Guernsey (H)	5	2	3	0	0	4	−0.626	
6	Norway	5	0	5	0	0	0	−2.525	

(H) Host

Round-robin
No.	Date	Team 1	Captain 1	Team 2	Captain 2	Venue	Result
T20I 791	15 June	Guernsey	Josh Butler	Jersey	Charles Perchard	King George V Sports Ground, Castel	Jersey by 8 wickets
T20I 792	15 June	Norway	Raza Iqbal	Italy	Gayashan Munasinghe	College Field, Saint Peter Port	Italy by 20 runs (DLS)
T20I 793	15 June	Guernsey	Josh Butler	Germany	Venkatraman Ganesan	King George V Sports Ground, Castel	Germany by 5 wickets
T20I 794	16 June	Italy	Gayashan Munasinghe	Germany	Venkatraman Ganesan	College Field, Saint Peter Port	Italy by 5 wickets
T20I 795	16 June	Jersey	Charles Perchard	Denmark	Hamid Shah	King George V Sports Ground, Castel	Jersey by 19 runs
T20I 796	16 June	Italy	Gayashan Munasinghe	Guernsey	Josh Butler	College Field, Saint Peter Port	Italy by 11 runs
T20I 797	16 June	Jersey	Charles Perchard	Norway	Raza Iqbal	King George V Sports Ground, Castel	Jersey by 80 runs
T20I 798	17 June	Norway	Raza Iqbal	Denmark	Hamid Shah	King George V Sports Ground, Castel	Denmark by 46 runs
T20I 799	18 June	Denmark	Hamid Shah	Guernsey	Josh Butler	King George V Sports Ground, Castel	No result
T20I 800	18 June	Denmark	Hamid Shah	Italy	Gayashan Munasinghe	King George V Sports Ground, Castel	No result
T20I 801	19 June	Guernsey	Josh Butler	Norway	Raza Iqbal	King George V Sports Ground, Castel	Guernsey by 4 wickets
T20I 802	19 June	Jersey	Charles Perchard	Italy	Gayashan Munasinghe	College Field, Saint Peter Port	Jersey by 73 runs
T20I 803	19 June	Germany	Rishi Pillai	Denmark	Hamid Shah	King George V Sports Ground, Castel	Germany by 7 wickets
T20I 804	20 June	Denmark	Hamid Shah	Guernsey	Josh Butler	King George V Sports Ground, Castel	Guernsey by 6 runs
T20I 805	20 June	Germany	Rishi Pillai	Norway	Raza Iqbal	College Field, Saint Peter Port	Germany by 7 wickets
T20I 806	20 June	Denmark	Hamid Shah	Italy	Gayashan Munasinghe	King George V Sports Ground, Castel	Denmark by 30 runs
T20I 807	20 June	Germany	Rishi Pillai	Jersey	Charles Perchard	College Field, Saint Peter Port	Germany by 3 wickets

=== Zimbabwe in Netherlands ===
ODI series
No.	Date	Home captain	Away captain	Venue	Result
ODI 4164	19 June	Pieter Seelaar	Hamilton Masakadza	Sportpark Het Schootsveld, Deventer	Netherlands by 7 wickets (DLS)
ODI 4167	21 June	Pieter Seelaar	Hamilton Masakadza	Sportpark Het Schootsveld, Deventer	Netherlands by 3 wickets
T20I series
No.	Date	Home captain	Away captain	Venue	Result
T20I 808	23 June	Pieter Seelaar	Hamilton Masakadza	Hazelaarweg, Rotterdam	Netherlands by 49 runs
T20I 811	25 June	Pieter Seelaar	Hamilton Masakadza	Hazelaarweg, Rotterdam	Match tied (Zimbabwe won S/O)

=== 2019 ICC Women's Qualifier Europe ===
Pos	Team	Pld	W	L	T	NR	Pts	NRR	
1	Netherlands	4	3	1	0	0	6	2.899	Advanced to qualifying tournament (Note: Scotland advance automatically as host of the qualifying tournament)
2	Scotland	4	3	1	0	0	6	2.371	Advanced to qualifying tournament
3	Germany	4	0	4	0	0	0	−5.967	

Notes:

Round-robin
No.	Date	Team 1	Captain 1	Team 2	Captain 2	Venue	Result
WT20I 680	26 June	Scotland	Kathryn Bryce	Germany	Christina Gough	La Manga Club, Murcia	Scotland by 8 wickets
WT20I 681	26 June	Scotland	Kathryn Bryce	Netherlands	Juliët Post	La Manga Club, Murcia	Netherlands by 7 runs
WT20I 682	27 June	Netherlands	Juliët Post	Germany	Christina Gough	La Manga Club, Murcia	Netherlands by 131 runs
WT20I 683	27 June	Netherlands	Juliët Post	Scotland	Kathryn Bryce	La Manga Club, Murcia	Match tied (Scotland won S/O)
WT20I 684	29 June	Germany	Christina Gough	Scotland	Kathryn Bryce	La Manga Club, Murcia	Scotland by 107 runs
WT20I 685	29 June	Germany	Christina Gough	Netherlands	Juliët Post	La Manga Club, Murcia	Netherlands by 9 wickets

== July ==
=== Zimbabwe in Ireland ===
ODI series
No.	Date	Home captain	Away captain	Venue	Result
ODI 4181	1 July	William Porterfield	Hamilton Masakadza	Bready Cricket Club Ground, Magheramason	Ireland by 4 wickets
ODI 4185	4 July	William Porterfield	Hamilton Masakadza	Stormont, Belfast	Ireland by 5 runs
ODI 4189	7 July	William Porterfield	Hamilton Masakadza	Stormont, Belfast	Ireland by 6 wickets
T20I series
No.	Date	Home captain	Away captain	Venue	Result
T20I 821a	10 July	Gary Wilson	Hamilton Masakadza	Stormont, Belfast	Match abandoned
T20I 825	12 July	Gary Wilson	Hamilton Masakadza	Bready Cricket Club Ground, Magheramason	Ireland by 9 wickets (DLS)
T20I 831	14 July	Gary Wilson	Hamilton Masakadza	Bready Cricket Club Ground, Magheramason	Zimbabwe by 8 wickets

=== Australia women in England ===
WODI series
No.	Date	Home captain	Away captain	Venue	Result
WODI 1158	2 July	Heather Knight	Meg Lanning	Grace Road, Leicester	Australia by 2 wickets
WODI 1159	4 July	Heather Knight	Meg Lanning	Grace Road, Leicester	Australia by 4 wickets
WODI 1160	7 July	Heather Knight	Meg Lanning	St Lawrence Ground, Canterbury	Australia by 194 runs
Only Test
No.	Date	Home captain	Away captain	Venue	Result
WTest 140	18–21 July	Heather Knight	Meg Lanning	County Ground, Taunton	Match drawn
WT20I series
No.	Date	Home captain	Away captain	Venue	Result
WT20I 700	26 July	Heather Knight	Meg Lanning	County Cricket Ground, Chelmsford	Australia by 93 runs
WT20I 701	28 July	Heather Knight	Meg Lanning	County Cricket Ground, Hove	Australia by 7 wickets
WT20I 705	31 July	Heather Knight	Meg Lanning	Bristol County Ground, Bristol	England by 17 runs

=== Zimbabwe women in Ireland ===
Zimbabwe Women were scheduled to tour Ireland to play three 50-over matches and three WT20Is. However, the tour was cancelled due to funding issues from Zimbabwe Cricket.

=== 2019 ICC T20 World Cup Asia Qualifier ===
Pos	Team	Pld	W	L	T	NR	Pts	NRR	
1	Singapore (H)	4	3	0	0	1	7	2.969	Qualified to 2019 T20 World Cup Qualifier
2	Qatar	4	2	2	0	0	4	−0.378	
3	Nepal	4	2	2	0	0	4	−0.682	
4	Kuwait	4	1	2	0	1	3	−1.179	
5	Malaysia	4	1	3	0	0	2	−0.390	

(H) Host

Round-robin
No.	Date	Team 1	Captain 1	Team 2	Captain 2	Venue	Result
T20I 832	22 July	Singapore	Amjad Mahboob	Qatar	Tamoor Sajjad	Indian Association Ground, Singapore	Singapore by 33 runs
T20I 833	22 July	Kuwait	Muhammad Kashif	Malaysia	Ahmad Faiz	Indian Association Ground, Singapore	Malaysia by 42 runs
T20I 834	23 July	Qatar	Tamoor Sajjad	Nepal	Paras Khadka	Indian Association Ground, Singapore	Qatar by 4 wickets
T20I 834a	23 July	Singapore	Amjad Mahboob	Kuwait	Muhammad Kashif	Indian Association Ground, Singapore	Match abandoned
T20I 835	24 July	Nepal	Gyanendra Malla	Malaysia	Ahmad Faiz	Indian Association Ground, Singapore	Nepal by 7 wickets
T20I 836	26 July	Qatar	Tamoor Sajjad	Kuwait	Muhammad Kashif	Indian Association Ground, Singapore	Kuwait by 10 runs
T20I 837	26 July	Singapore	Amjad Mahboob	Malaysia	Ahmad Faiz	Indian Association Ground, Singapore	Singapore by 8 wickets
T20I 838	27 July	Kuwait	Muhammad Kashif	Nepal	Paras Khadka	Indian Association Ground, Singapore	Nepal by 7 wickets
T20I 839	27 July	Malaysia	Ahmad Faiz	Qatar	Tamoor Sajjad	Indian Association Ground, Singapore	Qatar by 4 wickets
T20I 840	28 July	Singapore	Amjad Mahboob	Nepal	Paras Khadka	Indian Association Ground, Singapore	Singapore by 82 runs

=== Ireland in England ===
Only Test
No.	Date	Home captain	Away captain	Venue	Result
Test 2352	24–27 July	Joe Root	William Porterfield	Lord's, London	England by 143 runs

=== Bangladesh in Sri Lanka ===
ODI series
No.	Date	Home captain	Away captain	Venue	Result
ODI 4193	26 July	Dimuth Karunaratne	Tamim Iqbal	R. Premadasa Stadium, Colombo	Sri Lanka by 91 runs
ODI 4194	28 July	Dimuth Karunaratne	Tamim Iqbal	R. Premadasa Stadium, Colombo	Sri Lanka by 7 wickets
ODI 4195	31 July	Dimuth Karunaratne	Tamim Iqbal	R. Premadasa Stadium, Colombo	Sri Lanka by 122 runs

== August ==
=== Australia in England ===
2019–2021 ICC World Test Championship, The Ashes – Test series
No.	Date	Home captain	Away captain	Venue	Result
Test 2353	1–5 August	Joe Root	Tim Paine	Edgbaston, Birmingham	Australia by 251 runs
Test 2355	14–18 August	Joe Root	Tim Paine	Lord's, London	Match drawn
Test 2357	22–26 August	Joe Root	Tim Paine	Headingley, Leeds	England by 1 wicket
Test 2360	4–8 September	Joe Root	Tim Paine	Old Trafford, Manchester	Australia by 185 runs
Test 2362	12–16 September	Joe Root	Tim Paine	The Oval, London	England by 135 runs

=== United Arab Emirates in Netherlands ===
T20I series
No.	Date	Home captain	Away captain	Venue	Result
T20I 841	3 August	Pieter Seelaar	Mohammad Naveed	VRA Cricket Ground, Amstelveen	United Arab Emirates by 13 runs
T20I 844	5 August	Pieter Seelaar	Mohammad Naveed	VRA Cricket Ground, Amstelveen	United Arab Emirates by 5 wickets
T20I 845	6 August	Pieter Seelaar	Mohammad Naveed	Sportpark Westvliet, Voorburg	United Arab Emirates by 14 runs
T20I 847	8 August	Pieter Seelaar	Rameez Shahzad	Sportpark Westvliet, Voorburg	United Arab Emirates by 7 wickets

=== India in West Indies and United States ===
T20I series
No.	Date	Home captain	Away captain	Venue	Result
T20I 842	3 August	Carlos Brathwaite	Virat Kohli	Central Broward Regional Park, Lauderhill	India by 4 wickets
T20I 843	4 August	Carlos Brathwaite	Virat Kohli	Central Broward Regional Park, Lauderhill	India by 22 runs (DLS)
T20I 846	6 August	Carlos Brathwaite	Virat Kohli	Providence Stadium, Guyana	India by 7 wickets
ODI series
No.	Date	Home captain	Away captain	Venue	Result
ODI 4196	8 August	Jason Holder	Virat Kohli	Providence Stadium, Guyana	No result
ODI 4197	11 August	Jason Holder	Virat Kohli	Queen's Park Oval, Port of Spain	India by 59 runs (DLS)
ODI 4199	14 August	Jason Holder	Virat Kohli	Queen's Park Oval, Port of Spain	India by 6 wickets (DLS)
2019–2021 ICC World Test Championship – Test series
No.	Date	Home captain	Away captain	Venue	Result
Test 2358	22–26 August	Jason Holder	Virat Kohli	Sir Vivian Richards Stadium, Antigua	India by 318 runs
Test 2359	30 August–3 September	Jason Holder	Virat Kohli	Sabina Park, Kingston	India by 257 runs

=== 2019 Netherlands Women's Quadrangular Series ===
Pos	Team	Pld	W	L	T	NR	Pts	NRR
1	Thailand	6	5	1	0	0	10	2.509
2	Scotland	6	4	2	0	0	8	−0.385
3	Ireland	6	2	3	0	1	5	1.320
4	Netherlands (H)	6	0	5	0	1	1	−4.113

(H) Host

Round-robin
No.	Date	Team 1	Captain 1	Team 2	Captain 2	Venue	Result
WT20I 715	8 August	Netherlands	Juliët Post	Ireland	Laura Delany	Sportpark Het Schootsveld, Deventer	Ireland by 79 runs
WT20I 716	8 August	Scotland	Sarah Bryce	Thailand	Sornnarin Tippoch	Sportpark Het Schootsveld, Deventer	Thailand by 74 runs
WT20I 717	9 August	Netherlands	Juliët Post	Scotland	Sarah Bryce	Sportpark Het Schootsveld, Deventer	Scotland by 5 runs (DLS)
WT20I 718	9 August	Ireland	Laura Delany	Thailand	Sornnarin Tippoch	Sportpark Het Schootsveld, Deventer	Thailand by 4 runs (DLS)
WT20I 719	10 August	Thailand	Sornnarin Tippoch	Netherlands	Juliët Post	Sportpark Het Schootsveld, Deventer	Thailand by 8 wickets
WT20I 720	10 August	Scotland	Sarah Bryce	Ireland	Laura Delany	Sportpark Het Schootsveld, Deventer	Scotland by 11 runs
WT20I 721	12 August	Thailand	Sornnarin Tippoch	Scotland	Sarah Bryce	Sportpark Het Schootsveld, Deventer	Scotland by 5 wickets
WT20I 722	12 August	Ireland	Laura Delany	Netherlands	Juliët Post	Sportpark Het Schootsveld, Deventer	No result
WT20I 723	13 August	Thailand	Sornnarin Tippoch	Ireland	Laura Delany	Sportpark Het Schootsveld, Deventer	Thailand by 7 wickets (DLS)
WT20I 724	13 August	Scotland	Sarah Bryce	Netherlands	Juliët Post	Sportpark Het Schootsveld, Deventer	Scotland by 62 runs (DLS)
WT20I 725	14 August	Ireland	Laura Delany	Scotland	Sarah Bryce	Sportpark Het Schootsveld, Deventer	Ireland by 9 wickets
WT20I 726	14 August	Netherlands	Juliët Post	Thailand	Sornnarin Tippoch	Sportpark Het Schootsveld, Deventer	Thailand by 93 runs

=== New Zealand in Sri Lanka ===
2019–2021 ICC World Test Championship – Test series
No.	Date	Home captain	Away captain	Venue	Result
Test 2354	14–18 August	Dimuth Karunaratne	Kane Williamson	Galle International Stadium, Galle	Sri Lanka by 6 wickets
Test 2356	22–26 August	Dimuth Karunaratne	Kane Williamson	P. Sara Oval, Colombo	New Zealand by an innings and 65 runs
T20I series
No.	Date	Home captain	Away captain	Venue	Result
T20I 878	1 September	Lasith Malinga	Tim Southee	Pallekele International Cricket Stadium, Kandy	New Zealand by 5 wickets
T20I 879	3 September	Lasith Malinga	Tim Southee	Pallekele International Cricket Stadium, Kandy	New Zealand by 4 wickets
T20I 880	6 September	Lasith Malinga	Tim Southee	Pallekele International Cricket Stadium, Kandy	Sri Lanka by 37 runs

=== 2019 Scotland Tri-Nation Series ===
2019–2023 ICC Cricket World Cup League 2 – Tri-series
No.	Date	Team 1	Captain 1	Team 2	Captain 2	Venue	Result
ODI 4198	14 August	Oman	Zeeshan Maqsood	Papua New Guinea	Assad Vala	Mannofield Park, Aberdeen	Oman by 4 wickets
ODI 4200	15 August	Scotland	Kyle Coetzer	Oman	Zeeshan Maqsood	Mannofield Park, Aberdeen	Oman by 8 wickets
ODI 4201	17 August	Scotland	Kyle Coetzer	Papua New Guinea	Assad Vala	Mannofield Park, Aberdeen	Scotland by 3 wickets
ODI 4202	18 August	Scotland	Kyle Coetzer	Oman	Zeeshan Maqsood	Mannofield Park, Aberdeen	Scotland by 85 runs
ODI 4203	20 August	Scotland	Kyle Coetzer	Papua New Guinea	Assad Vala	Mannofield Park, Aberdeen	Scotland by 38 runs
ODI 4204	21 August	Oman	Zeeshan Maqsood	Papua New Guinea	Assad Vala	Mannofield Park, Aberdeen	Oman by 4 wickets

=== 2019 ICC T20 World Cup Americas Qualifier ===
Team	P	W	L	T	NR	Pts	NRR	Status
Canada (Q)	6	5	0	0	1	11	+2.417	Qualify to 2019 ICC T20 World Cup Qualifier
Bermuda (H, Q)	6	4	1	0	1	9	+0.240	Qualify to 2019 ICC T20 World Cup Qualifier
United States	6	2	4	0	0	4	+0.419	
Cayman Islands	6	0	6	0	0	0	–2.591	

(H) Host, (Q) Qualified

Round-robin
No.	Date	Team 1	Captain 1	Team 2	Captain 2	Venue	Result
T20I 851	18 August	Bermuda	Terryn Fray	United States	Saurabh Netravalkar	White Hill Field, Sandys Parish	Bermuda by 6 runs
T20I 852	18 August	Canada	Navneet Dhaliwal	Cayman Islands	Alessandro Morris	White Hill Field, Sandys Parish	Canada by 84 runs
T20I 854	19 August	Bermuda	Terryn Fray	Canada	Navneet Dhaliwal	Bermuda National Stadium, Hamilton	No result
T20I 855	19 August	United States	Saurabh Netravalkar	Cayman Islands	Alessandro Morris	Bermuda National Stadium, Hamilton	United States by 10 runs (DLS)
T20I 857	21 August	Bermuda	Terryn Fray	Cayman Islands	Alessandro Morris	White Hill Field, Sandys Parish	Bermuda by 6 wickets
T20I 858	21 August	United States	Saurabh Netravalkar	Canada	Navneet Dhaliwal	White Hill Field, Sandys Parish	Canada by 4 wickets
T20I 860	22 August	Cayman Islands	Alessandro Morris	Canada	Navneet Dhaliwal	White Hill Field, Sandys Parish	Canada by 8 wickets
T20I 861	22 August	United States	Saurabh Netravalkar	Bermuda	Terryn Fray	White Hill Field, Sandys Parish	Bermuda by 5 wickets
T20I 863	24 August	Cayman Islands	Alessandro Morris	United States	Saurabh Netravalkar	White Hill Field, Sandys Parish	United States by 9 wickets
T20I 864	24 August	Canada	Navneet Dhaliwal	Bermuda	Terryn Fray	White Hill Field, Sandys Parish	Canada by 8 wickets
T20I 865	25 August	Canada	Navneet Dhaliwal	United States	Saurabh Netravalkar	White Hill Field, Sandys Parish	Canada by 15 runs
T20I 866	25 August	Cayman Islands	Alessandro Morris	Bermuda	Dion Stovell	White Hill Field, Sandys Parish	Bermuda by 6 wickets

=== Afghanistan in Zimbabwe ===
In July 2019, the ICC suspended Zimbabwe Cricket. The country was scheduled to host Afghanistan for a Test match, five ODIs and three T20I fixtures. On 20 August 2019, the Afghan Cricket Board announced the Test and T20I squads for its first fixtures of the 2019–20 season, with no reference to the tour of Zimbabwe.

=== 2019 ICC Women's World Twenty20 Qualifier ===
Pos	Team	Pld	W	L	T	NR	Pts	NRR
1	Bangladesh	3	3	0	0	0	6	2.821
2	Papua New Guinea	3	2	1	0	0	4	0.445
3	Scotland	3	1	2	0	0	2	0.377
4	United States	3	0	3	0	0	0	−3.064

Pos	Team	Pld	W	L	T	NR	Pts	NRR
1	Thailand	3	3	0	0	0	6	1.522
2	Ireland	3	2	1	0	0	4	0.905
3	Netherlands	3	1	2	0	0	2	−0.615
4	Namibia	3	0	3	0	0	0	−1.503

Group stage
No.	Date	Team 1	Captain 1	Team 2	Captain 2	Venue	Result
WT20I 733	31 August	Thailand	Sornnarin Tippoch	Netherlands	Juliët Post	Lochlands, Arbroath	Thailand by 30 runs
WT20I 734	31 August	Scotland	Kathryn Bryce	United States	Sindhu Sriharsha	Forthill, Dundee	Scotland by 30 runs
WT20I 735	31 August	Namibia	Yasmeen Khan	Ireland	Laura Delany	Lochlands, Arbroath	Ireland by 7 wickets
WT20I 736	1 September	Thailand	Sornnarin Tippoch	Namibia	Yasmeen Khan	Forthill, Dundee	Thailand by 38 runs
WT20I 737	1 September	Scotland	Kathryn Bryce	Papua New Guinea	Kaia Arua	Lochlands, Arbroath	Papua New Guinea by 6 wickets
WT20I 738	1 September	Ireland	Laura Delany	Netherlands	Juliët Post	Forthill, Dundee	Ireland by 19 runs
WT20I 739	1 September	United States	Sindhu Sriharsha	Bangladesh	Salma Khatun	Lochlands, Arbroath	Bangladesh by 8 wickets
WT20I 740	2 September	Bangladesh	Salma Khatun	Papua New Guinea	Kaia Arua	Forthill, Dundee	Bangladesh by 6 runs (DLS)
WT20I 741	3 September	Ireland	Laura Delany	Thailand	Sornnarin Tippoch	Forthill, Dundee	Thailand by 2 runs (DLS)
WT20I 742	3 September	Netherlands	Juliët Post	Namibia	Yasmeen Khan	Lochlands, Arbroath	Netherlands by 6 wickets
WT20I 743	3 September	Scotland	Kathryn Bryce	Bangladesh	Salma Khatun	Forthill, Dundee	Bangladesh by 13 runs (DLS)
WT20I 744	3 September	Papua New Guinea	Ravina Oa	United States	Sindhu Sriharsha	Lochlands, Arbroath	Papua New Guinea by 22 runs (DLS)
Semi Finals
WT20I 747	5 September	Bangladesh	Salma Khatun	Ireland	Laura Delany	Forthill, Dundee	Bangladesh by 4 wickets
WT20I 748	5 September	Netherlands	Juliët Post	United States	Sindhu Sriharsha	Lochlands, Arbroath	Netherlands by 9 wickets
WT20I 749	5 September	Thailand	Sornnarin Tippoch	Papua New Guinea	Ravina Oa	Forthill, Dundee	Thailand by 8 wickets
WT20I 750	5 September	Scotland	Kathryn Bryce	Namibia	Yasmeen Khan	Lochlands, Arbroath	Scotland by 10 wickets
Playoff Matches
WT20I 754	7 September	United States	Sindhu Sriharsha	Namibia	Yasmeen Khan	Forthill, Dundee	United States by 6 wickets
WT20I 753	7 September	Ireland	Laura Delany	Papua New Guinea	Kaia Arua	Lochlands, Arbroath	Ireland by 8 wickets
WT20I 757	7 September	Netherlands	Juliët Post	Scotland	Kathryn Bryce	Lochlands, Arbroath	Scotland by 70 runs
WT20I 756	7 September	Bangladesh	Salma Khatun	Thailand	Sornnarin Tippoch	Forthill, Dundee	Bangladesh by 70 runs

==== Final standings ====
Position	Team
1st	Bangladesh
2nd	Thailand
3rd	Ireland
4th	Papua New Guinea
5th	Scotland
6th	Netherlands
7th	United States
8th	Namibia

Qualified for the 2020 World Twenty20.

== See also ==
- Associate international cricket in 2019
