= Gladesville Ryde Magic FC =

Soccer club in Australia

- Full name: Gladesville Ryde Magic Football Club
- Nickname: Magic
- Founded: 1977; 49 years ago
- Ground: Christie Park, North Ryde
- League: NSW League Two
- 2025: 13th of 15
- Website: grmfc.com
Home colours	Away colours

Gladesville Ryde Magic Football Club is an Australian semi-professional football club based in Gladesville, North Ryde, New South Wales. The club currently has senior squads competing in the NSW League Two and youth squads competing in the NSW Youth League Three. The club also has a number of junior squads.

Until 2018, the club's home ground was Magdala Park, situated in North Ryde on the leafy Lane Cove River. The 2018 season brought with it the inception of a new home ground, Fortress Magic, at the newly upgraded Christie Park.

== Players ==
=== First Grade ===
Note: Flags indicate national team as defined under FIFA eligibility rules; some limited exceptions apply. Players may hold more than one non-FIFA nationality.

No.	Pos.	Nation	Player
1		AUS	Gabriel Koliomihos
2		AUS	Cameron Newton
3		AUS	Sergio Tarazona
4		AUS	Aaron Khan
5		AUS	Lachlan Harte
6		AUS	Zoran Kolundic
8		AUS	Peter Voukidis
9	FW	AUS	Chris Gaitatzis (C)
10	MF	AUS	Christos Tomaras
11	MF	AUS	Chris Triantis
12		AUS	Adrien Jolly

No.	Pos.	Nation	Player
14		AUS	Abanoub Mickael
15	FW	AUS	Kostandinos Nikas
16		AUS	Jordan Barrett
17		AUS	George Diamantopoulos
18		AUS	Rosario Occhipinti
19	MF	AUS	Robert Mileski
32		AUS	Manual Manias
33	GK	GRE	Kyriakos Tohouroglou
44		AUS	Benjamin Kerr
—		AUS	Andrew De Brito

== History ==
Gladesville Ryde Magic was formed in 1977 by Greek-Australians under the original name of Gladesville United. The club is based in the Northern Suburbs of Sydney and throughout its history the club has been a mainstay of the New South Wales State Leagues.

=== Colours and badge ===
The primary club colours of Gladesville Ryde Magic FC are blue and white. The club crest pays homage to the Greek-Australians who formed the club back in 1977 as well as the Gladesville Bridge, a local steel icon.

=== Results ===
Competition	Season	Regular season	Club Championship
NSW NPL3	2018	3rd	2nd
NSW NPL3	2017	6th	8th

=== Divisional History ===
- 2010–present (10): NSW Division 1, NSW NPL3, NSW League Two (NSW Tier 3)
- 2009 (1): NSW Division 2 (Tier 4)
- 2003–2008 (6): NSW Division 3 (Tier 5)
- 2001–2002 (2): NSW Division 4 (Tier 6)
- 2000: Withdrew from NSW competition
- 1999: NSW Division 3 (Tier 4)
- 1997–1998 (2): NSW Division 2 (Tier 3)
- 1995–1996 (2): NSW Division 3 (Tier 4)
- 1994: NSW Division 4 (Tier 5)
- 1991–1993 (3): NSW Division 5 (Tier 6)
