= Christos Tomaras =

Australian footballer

Personal information
- Full name: Christos Tomaras
- Date of birth: 14 January 1989 (age 37)
- Place of birth: Sydney, Australia
- Height: 1.76 m (5 ft 9 in)
- Positions: Winger; attacking midfielder

Team information
- Current team: Bankstown City

Senior career*
Years	Team	Apps	(Gls)
2007–2009	Apollon Kalamarias	5	(0)
2007	→ Thermaikos (loan)	0	(0)
2008	→ AE Giannena (loan)	17	(1)
2009–2010	Kozani	24	(2)
2010–2011	Eordaikos 2007	26	(0)
2011–2012	Paniliakos	17	(1)
2012	Apollon Smyrnis	0	(0)
2013	Paniliakos	10	(0)
2013–2014	Sydney Olympic	21	(2)
2015	Blacktown City	16	(0)
2016–2019	Gladesville Ryde Magic	88	(35)
2020–	Bankstown City	23	(6)
- * Club domestic league appearances and goals as of 10 November 2021

Christos Tomaras (Greek: Χρήστος Τομαράς, born 14 January 1989) is an Australian soccer player currently playing for Sydney Olympic in the National Premier Leagues NSW as a striker.

== Career ==
Christos Tomaras began playing professional football with Apollon Kalamaria . He also played for Kozani and Eordaikos 2007 . Then he transferred to Paniliakos . He moved to the Elia club from Eordaikos 2007 on 12 September 2011.
