= List of stadiums in Oceania =

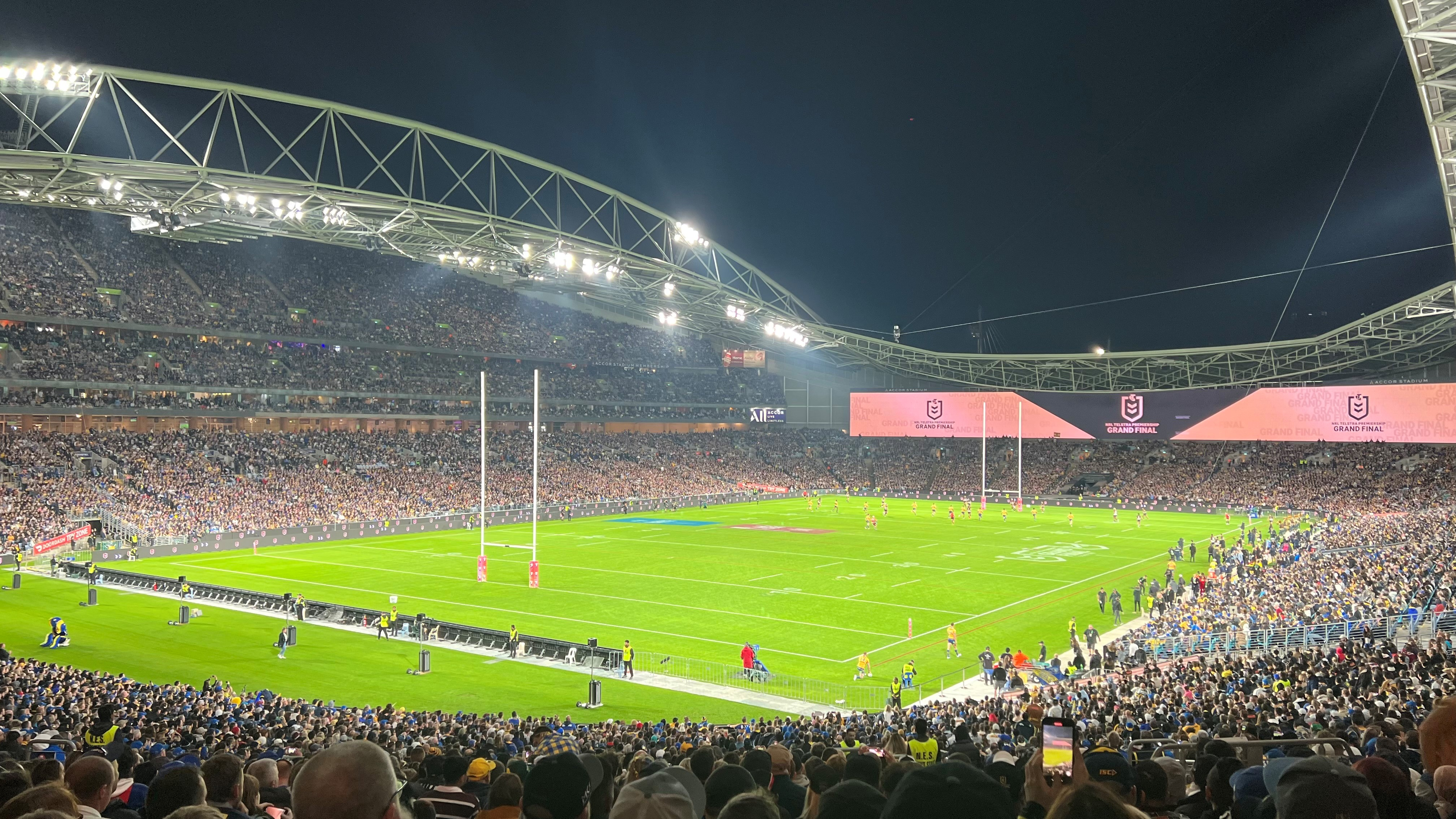
Stadium Australia

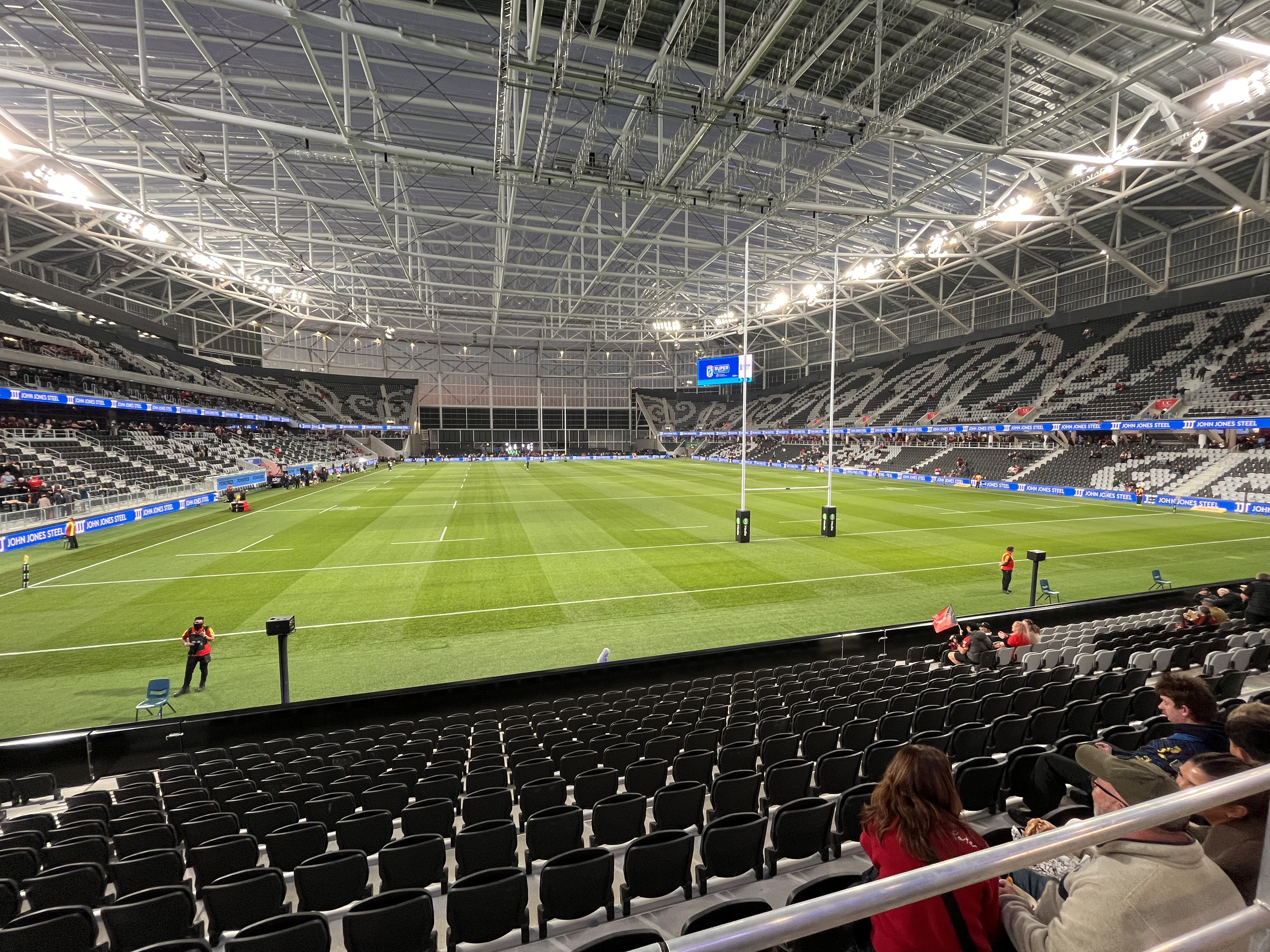
One New Zealand Stadium

The following is a list of stadiums in Oceania.

== List ==
=== American Samoa ===
- Veterans Memorial Stadium – Pago Pago

=== Australia ===
==== Cricket and Australian rules football ====
- AAMI Stadium – Adelaide (formerly Football Park)
- Adelaide Oval – Adelaide
- Arden St Oval – Melbourne
- Aurora Stadium – Launceston
- Bellerive Oval – Hobart
- Brisbane Cricket Ground – Brisbane (Commonly known as "the Gabba")
- Drummoyne Oval – Sydney
- Etihad Stadium – Melbourne (formerly Colonial Stadium, Telstra Dome and Docklands Stadium)
- Kooyong Stadium – Melbourne
- Lilac Hill – Perth
- Ikon Park – Melbourne
- Magdalla Park – Sydney
- Manuka Oval – Canberra
- Marrara Oval – Darwin
- Melbourne Cricket Ground – Melbourne
- Metricon Stadium – Gold Coast
- North Hobart Oval – Hobart
- Patersons Stadium – Perth (originally "Subiaco Oval")
- Richmond Cricket Ground – Melbourne
- Skilled Stadium – Geelong (formerly Kardinia Park)
- Sydney Cricket Ground – Sydney
- Victoria Park – Melbourne
- WACA Ground – Perth
- Waverley Park – Melbourne
- Windy Hill – Melbourne

==== Rugby league, rugby union and soccer ====
- 1300 Smiles Stadium – Townsville (Formerly known as Stockland Stadium & Dairy Farmers Stadium)
- AAMI Park – Melbourne (known non-commercially as Melbourne Rectangular Stadium)
- ANZ Stadium – Sydney (formerly Stadium Australia and Telstra Stadium)
- Hunter Stadium – Newcastle (formerly Marathon Stadium, EnergyAustralia Stadium & Ausgrid Stadium)
- Ballymore Stadium – Brisbane
- Belmore Oval, Sydney – Sydney
- Cbus Super Stadium – Gold Coast
- Central Coast Stadium – Central Coast, New South Wales
- Brookvale Oval – Sydney
- Campbelltown Stadium – Sydney
- GIO Stadium – Canberra (formerly Bruce Stadium and Canberra Stadium (while GIO has the naming rights))
- EW Moore Oval – Griffith, NSW
- Dolphin Oval – Brisbane
- Henson Park, Sydney – Sydney
- Hindmarsh Stadium – Adelaide
- Leichhardt Oval – Sydney
- nib Stadium – Perth
- Olympic Park Stadium – Melbourne (Closed & Demolished)
- Parramatta Stadium – Sydney
- Pepper Stadium – Sydney
- Perry Lakes Stadium – Perth
- Pioneer Oval – Sydney
- QSAC Stadium – Brisbane (formally QEII Stadium)
- Redfern Oval – Sydney
- Suncorp Stadium – Brisbane (formerly Lang Park)
- Sydney Football Stadium – Sydney (formerly Aussie Stadium )
- Remondis Stadium – Cronulla
- WIN Jubilee Oval – Sydney (Formerly known as Kogarah Park)
- WIN Stadium – Wollongong

==== Basketball, cycling, swimming and tennis ====
- Acer Arena – Sydney
- Brisbane Entertainment Centre – Brisbane
- Brisbane Convention & Exhibition Centre – Brisbane
- Derwent Entertainment Centre – Hobart
- Dunc Gray Velodrome – Sydney
- HBF Stadium – Perth
- Hisense Arena – Melbourne
- Kooyong Stadium – Melbourne
- Margaret Court Arena – Melbourne
- NSW Tennis Centre – Sydney
- Perth Arena – Perth
- Queensland Tennis Centre – Brisbane
- Rod Laver Arena – Melbourne
- Silverdome – Launceston
- Sleeman Centre – Brisbane
- Sydney Entertainment Centre – Sydney

==== Other ====
- Dealadrome – Melbourne

=== Cook Islands ===
- National Stadium, Avarua
- CIFA Academy. Matavera

=== Federated States of Micronesia ===
- Yap Sports Complex – Colonia

=== Fiji ===
- National Stadium – Suva

=== French Polynesia ===
- Stade Pater – Pirae

=== Guam ===
- Paseo Stadium – Agana
- Wettengel Rugby Field – Agana

=== Kiribati ===
- Bairiki National Stadium – Bairiki

=== Marshall Islands ===
- Sports Stadium – Majuro

=== Nauru ===
- Linkbelt Oval – Aiwo
- Meneng Stadium – Meneng District

=== New Caledonia ===
- Stade Numa-Daly Magenta – Nouméa

=== New Zealand ===
- Fraser Park – Timaru
- AMI Stadium (formerly Jade Stadium and Lancaster Park) – Christchurch
- ASB Tennis Centre – Auckland
- Basin Reserve – Wellington
- Baypark Stadium – Mount Maunganui
- Bert Sutcliffe Oval – Lincoln
- Bluewater Stadium – Napier
- Carisbrook – Dunedin
- Caledonian Ground – Dunedin
- Carlaw Park – Auckland
- Horncastle Arena – Christchurch
- Centennial Park – Christchurch
- Centennial Park – Ngāruawāhia
- Centennial Park – Oamaru
- Centre Park – Māngere
- Cobham Oval – Whangārei
- Colin Maiden Park – Auckland
- Cooks Gardens – Wanganui
- Cornwall Park Stadium – Auckland
- Dunedin Ice Stadium – Dunedin
- Forsyth Barr Stadium – Dunedin
- Growers Stadium – Pukekohe
- Eden Park – Auckland
- Edgar Centre – Dunedin
- Energy Events Centre – Rotorua
- English Park – Christchurch
- Hagley Oval – Christchurch
- Fitzherbert Park – Palmerston North
- Fred Taylor Park – West Auckland
- Kiwitea Street – Auckland
- Landsdowne Park – Blenheim
- Mainpower Oval – Rangiora
- McLean Park – Napier
- Memorial Park Ground – Mosgiel
- Moana Pool – Dunedin
- Mount Smart Stadium (formerly Ericsson Stadium) – Auckland
- Mystery Creek Events Centre – Hamilton
- Nelson Park – Napier
- Newtown Park – Wellington
- North Harbour Stadium – Albany
- North Shore Events Centre – Auckland
- One New Zealand Stadium Christchurch
- Owen Delany Park – Taupō
- Pettigrew Green Arena – Taradale
- Porirua Park – Porirua
- Pukekura Park – New Plymouth
- Queenstown Events Centre – Queenstown
- Queen Elizabeth Youth Centre – Tauranga
- Queen Elizabeth II Park – Christchurch
- Rotorua International Stadium – Rotorua
- Rugby League Park – Christchurch
- Rugby Park – Christchurch
- Rugby Park – Greymouth
- Rugby Park Stadium – Invercargill
- Stadium Southland – Invercargill
- Stadium Taranaki – New Plymouth
- Sunnyvale Park – Dunedin
- Tahuna Park – Dunedin
- Te Rauparaha Arena – Porirua
- TelstraClear Pacific Events Centre – Auckland
- Tepid Baths – Auckland
- Toll Stadium – Whangārei
- Trafalgar Centre – Nelson
- Trafalgar Park – Nelson
- Trusts Stadium – West Auckland
- TSB Bank Arena – Wellington
- TSB Stadium – New Plymouth
- University Oval – Dunedin
- Spark Arena – Auckland
- Village Green – Christchurch
- Waikato Stadium – Hamilton
- Western Springs Stadium – Auckland
- Westpac Park – Hamilton
- Westpac Stadium – Wellington
- Wingham Park – Greymouth

=== Niue ===
- Niue High School Oval – Alofi
- Village Park (stadium) – Alofi

=== Norfolk Island ===
- Norfolk Island Central School Oval – Cascade

=== Northern Mariana Islands ===
- F.M. Palacios Field – Saipan

=== Palau ===
- National Stadium – Koror

=== Papua New Guinea ===
- Hubert Murray Stadium – Port Moresby

=== Samoa ===
- National Soccer Stadium – Tuanaimato

=== Solomon Islands ===
- Pacific Games Stadium – Honiara

=== Tokelau ===
- Hemoana Stadium – Nukunonu

=== Tonga ===
- Mangweni Stadium – Nukuʻalofa

=== Tuvalu ===
- Tuvalu Sports Ground – Funafuti

=== Vanuatu ===
- Korman Stadium – Port-Vila
- Port Vila Municipal Stadium – Port-Vila

=== Wallis and Futuna ===
- Stade de Mata-Utu – Mata-Utu

== Gallery ==
Oceanian stadiums

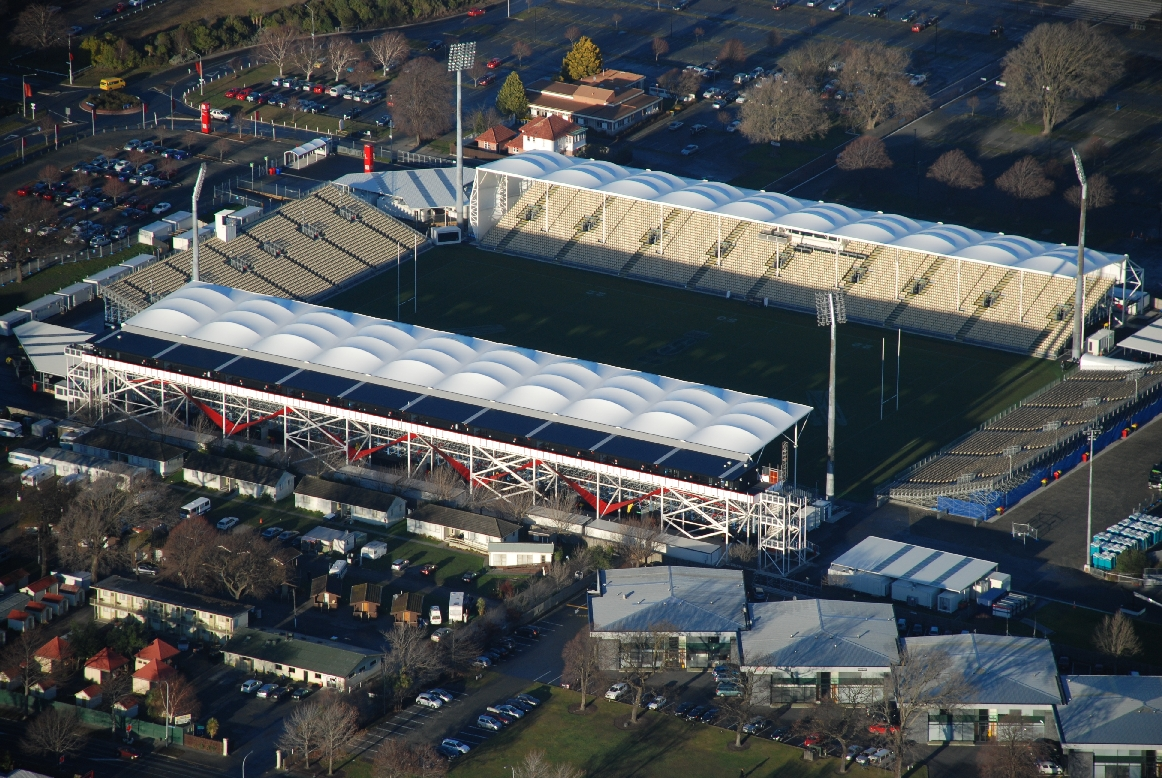
Apollo Projects Stadium

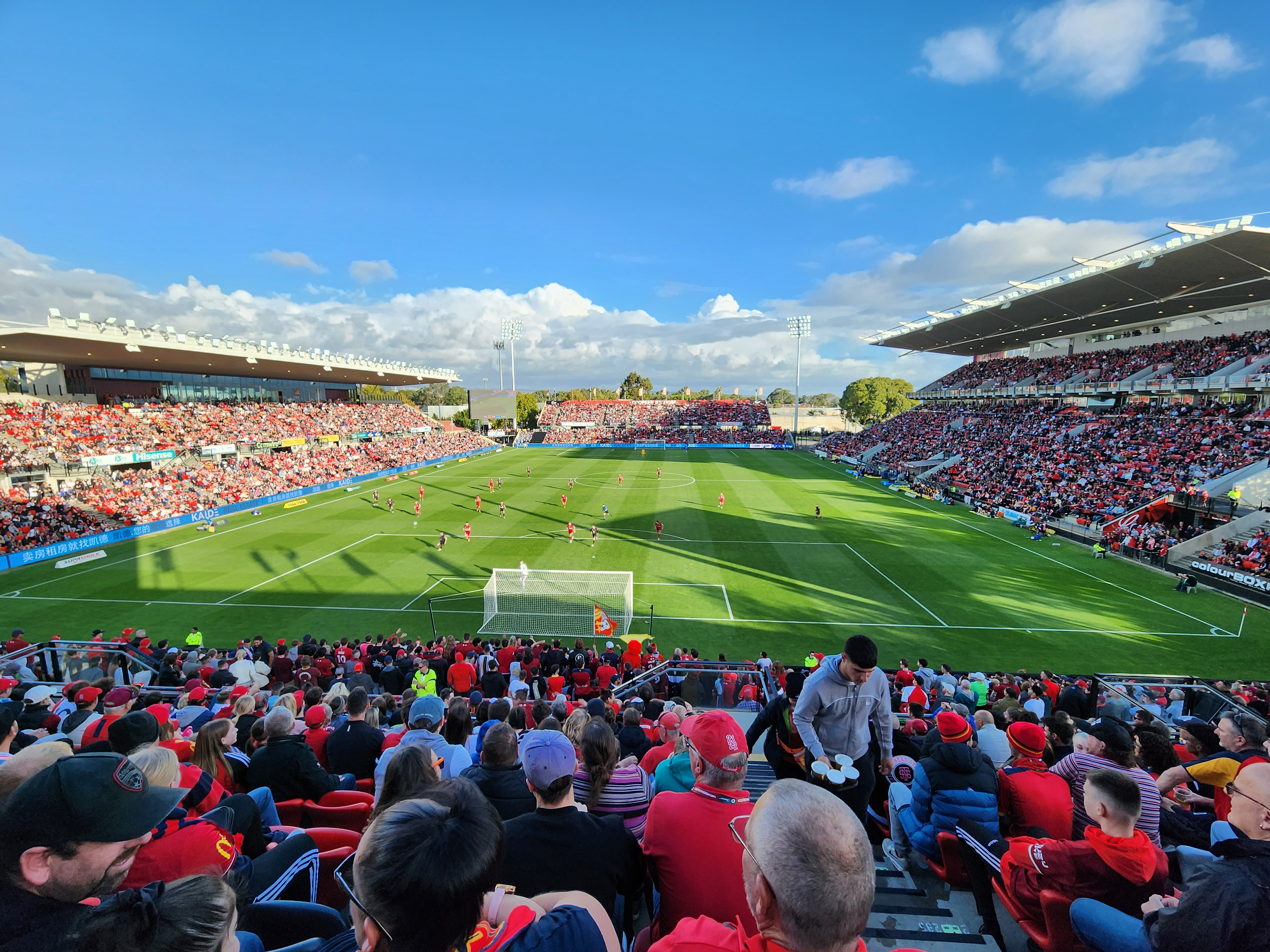
Coopers Stadium

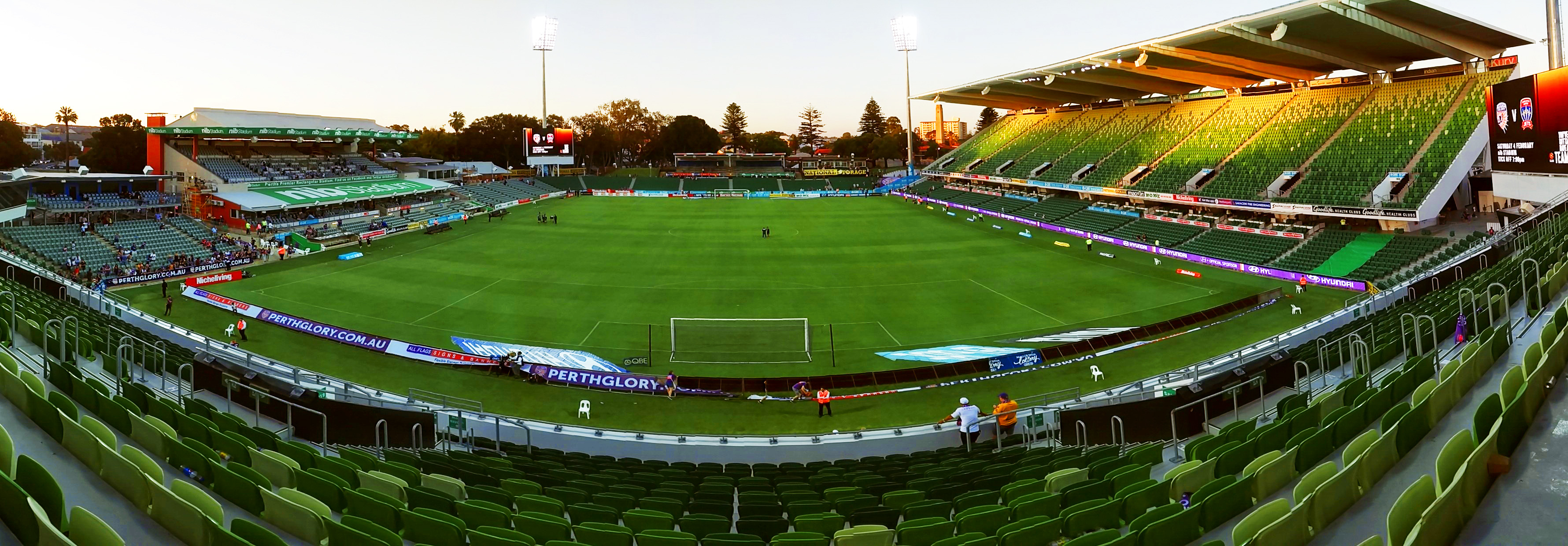
HBF Field

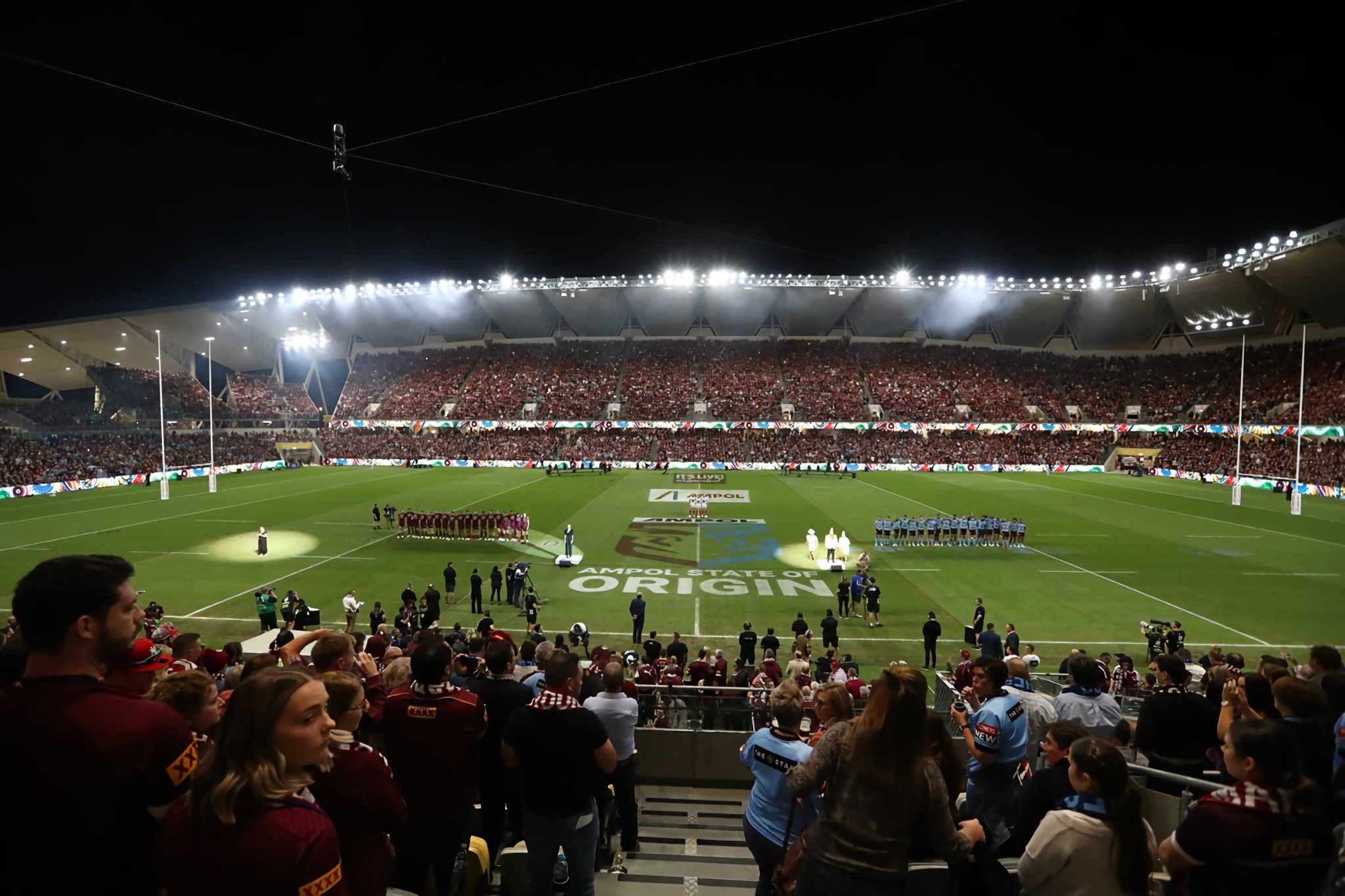
Queensland Country Bank Stadium

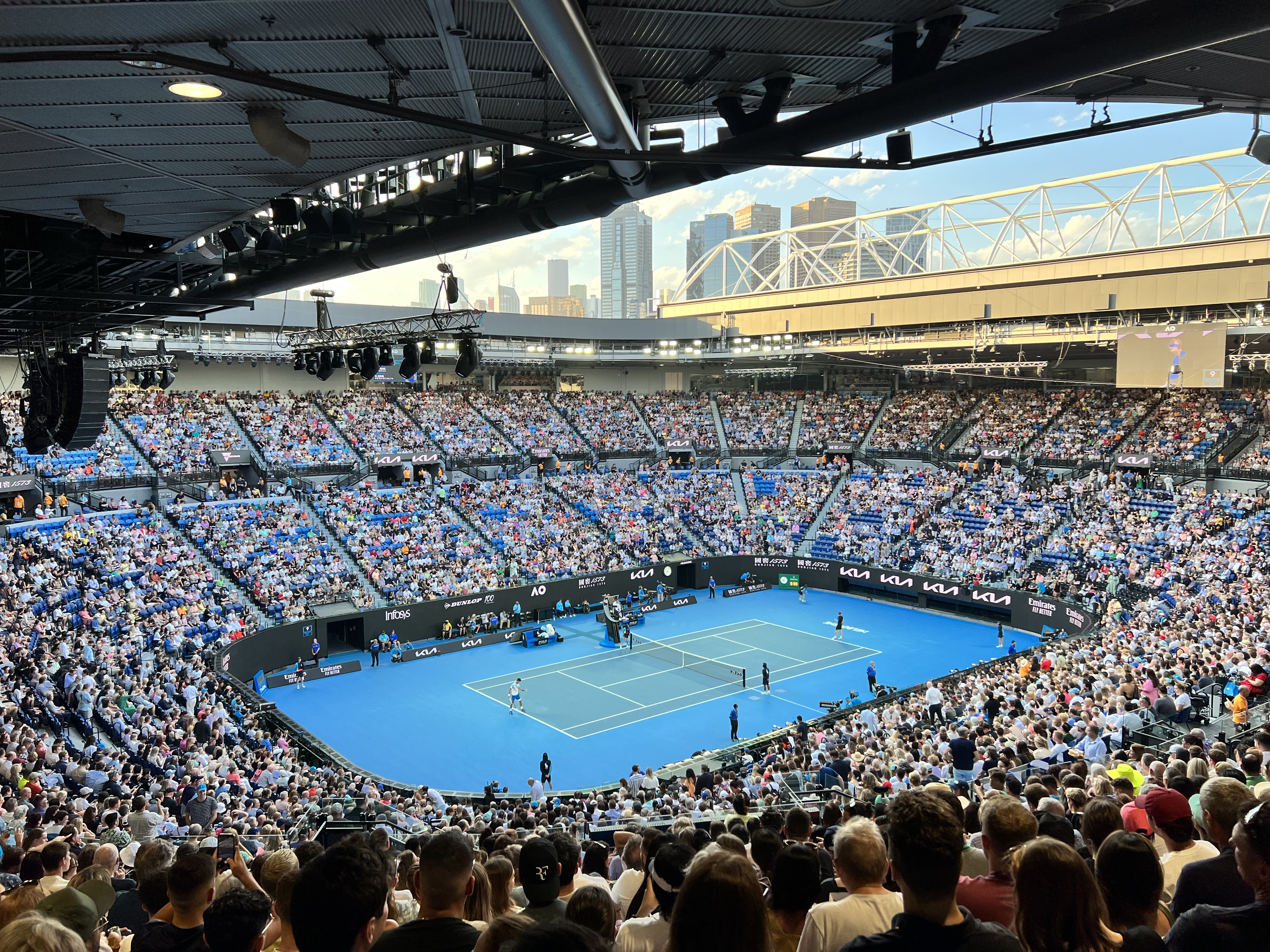
Rod Laver Arena

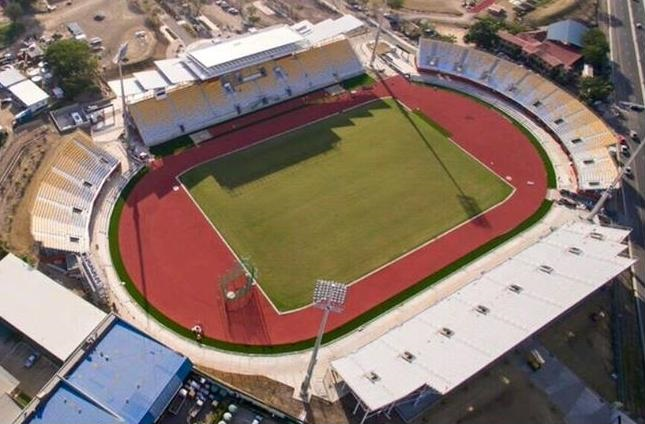
Sir John Guise Stadium

== See also ==
- List of stadiums in Africa
- List of stadiums in Asia
- List of stadiums in Central America and the Caribbean
- List of stadiums in Europe
- List of stadiums in North America
- List of stadiums in South America
- List of Oceanian stadiums by capacity
- List of association football stadiums by country
- Lists of stadiums
