= Magdala Park =

Reserve in Ryde LGA, New South Wales, Australia

- Interactive map of Magdala Park
- Location: Magdala Road, East Ryde
- Coordinates: 33°48′16″S 151°08′34″E
- Owner: City of Ryde
- Operator: City of Ryde
- Capacity: 3,000
- Surface: Grass

Construction
- Groundbreaking: 1986
- Opened: 1987
- Cost: A$10,000

Magdala Park is a recreational area. The park is adjacent to Lane Cove River, Sydney, Australia. The park also has forest areas, where recreational activities are taken up. The football field playing surfaces are maintained by the City of Ryde Council. The park has a canteen, seating and lights.

== Used by ==
- Gladesville Ryde Magic Football Club
- North Ryde Soccer

== See also ==
- Football NSW
