= Josh Butler (cricketer) =

Guernsey cricketer (born 1996)

Personal information
- Full name: Joshua Butler
- Born: 8 August 1996 (age 30); Vale, Guernsey
- Batting: Right-handed
- Bowling: Right-arm medium pace
- Role: Batter

International information
- National side: Guernsey
- T20I debut (cap 3): 31 May 2019 v Jersey
- Last T20I: 23 May 2026 v Jersey

Career statistics
Competition	T20I
Matches	47
Runs scored	1,087
Batting average	27.87
100s/50s	0/5
Top score	87
Balls bowled	108
Wickets	5
Bowling average	24.80
5 wickets in innings	0
10 wickets in match	0
Best bowling	3/16
Catches/stumpings	18/–
- Source: ESPNcricinfo, 26 May 2026

Josh Butler (born 8 August 1996) is a professional cricketer who has played for Guernsey since 2016, when he took part in the 2016 ICC World Cricket League Division Five tournament.

In May 2019, he was named the captain of Guernsey's squad for the 2019 T20 Inter-Insular Cup, and made his Twenty20 International (T20I) debut against Jersey on 31 May 2019. The same month, he was named as the captain of Guernsey's squad for the Regional Finals of the 2018–19 ICC T20 World Cup Europe Qualifier tournament in Guernsey.

At the 2026 Men's T20 World Cup Europe Sub-regional Qualifier A in Cyprus, Butler scored 68 in Guernsey's win over Austria in the group stages and 50 in the tournament final defeat against Jersey.
