= List of Blacktown City FC seasons =

Blacktown City FC is an association football club based in Sydney, Australia. The club was formed in 1953 as has competed at the highest tier of soccer in Australia, spending 7 seasons in the National Soccer League. Currently, the club participates in the National Premier Leagues NSW competition, which is the second highest tier of soccer in Australia. The club has won 8 premierships and 9 championships in the NSW top flight and well as one National Premier Leagues title.

== Key ==
Key to league competitions

- NSL = National Soccer League
- NSW Div. 1 = New South Wales First Division
- NSW State League = New South Wales First Division
- NSWSL = New South Wales Super League
- NSWPL = New South Wales Premier League
- NPL NSW = National Premier Leagues NSW
- NSW Div. 2 = New South Wales Second Division
- NSW Div. 3 = New South Wales Third Division
- NSW Inter Sub. (Div 1. / Div. 2) = NSW Inter Suburban First / Second Divisions

Key to colours and symbols:

1st or W	Winners
2nd or RU	Runners-up
3rd	Third
♦	Top scorer in division

Key to finals and cup record:

- PF = Preliminary Final
- PO = Playoff Final
- EF = Elimination Final
- 1R, 2R, 3R...7R = 1st Round, 2nd Round, 3rd Round...7th Round
- R32 = Round of 32
- R16 = Round of 16
- GS = Group Stage
- QF = Quarter-finalist
- SF = Semi-finalist
- RU = Runners-Up
- W = Winners

Key to tournaments:

- OCC = OFC Club Championship
- FCWC = FIFA Club World Cup
- NPLF = National Premier Leagues Finals

== Seasons ==
Season	League										Waratah Cup	NPL Finals NSL Cup / FFA Cup	Top scorer	
Season	Div	Pld	W	D	L	GF	GA	Pts	Pos	Finals	Waratah Cup	NPL Finals NSL Cup / FFA Cup	Player(s)	Goals
1973	NSW Inter Sub. Div. 2 ↑	20	16	3	1	74	28	35	1st	W	Not held			
1974	NSW Inter Sub. Div. 1 ↑	22	17	5	0	66	16	39	1st	W	unknown			
1975	NSW Div. 3 ↑	22	16	4	2	61	19	36	1st	W	unknown			
1976	NSW Div. 2	22	5	6	11	33	40	16	9th	–	unknown			
1977	NSW Div. 2 ↑	22	16	5	1	59	19	37	2nd	SF	Not held			
1978	NSW Div. 1	26	10	6	10	31	31	26	7th	–	Not held			
1979	NSW State League	26	13	5	8	45	36	31	4th	SF	Not held			
1980	NSW State League ↑	28	12	11	5	57	39	35	5th	–	Not held			
1980	NSL	26	9	3	14	34	55	21	11th	–	Not held	NSL Cup – R16		
1981	NSL ↓	30	6	9	15	32	47	21	15th	–	Not held	NSL Cup – PR		
1982	NSW State League	26	16	6	4	50	28	38	3rd	SF	Not held			
1983	NSW Div. 1 ↑	24	17	1	6	54	24	35	3rd	SF	Not held			
1984	NSL (Nth Conf.)	28	12	6	10	43	48	30	5th	EF	Not held	NSL Cup – GS		
1985	NSL (Nth Conf.)	22	7	4	11	30	34	18	8th	–	Not held	NSL Cup – 1R		
1986	NSL (Nth Conf.) ↓	22	8	4	10	24	36	20	9th	–	Not held	NSL Cup – QF		
1987	NSW Div. 1	26	19	1	6	60	19	39	3rd	PF	Not held			
1988	NSW Div. 1 ↑	26	18	4	4	55	17	40	1st	RU	Not held			
1989	NSL	26	5	9	12	28	50	19	12th	–	Not held	NSL Cup – R16		
1989–90	NSL↓	26	4	4	18	30	55	12	14th	–	Not held	NSL Cup – QF		
1990	NSW Div. 1	16	7	2	7	25	22	16	9th	–	unknown			
1991	NSW Div. 1	22	10	7+1	4	32	17	45	2nd		W			
1992	NSWSL	22	10	3+3	6	30	24	39	3rd		QF			
1993	NSWSL	26	16	7+0	3	48	20	62	1st		W			
1994	NSWSL	22	9	3+4	6	33	29	37	4th		unknown			
1995	NSWSL	26	16	4+2	4	42	18	58	2nd		6R			
1996	NSWSL (S. 1)	13	5	4	4	17	11	19	8th	–	unknown			
1996	NSWSL(S. 2)	13	3	3	7	19	20	12	12th	–	unknown			
1997	NSWSL	20	7	6	7	29	26	27	4th		unknown			
1998	NSWSL	22	13	5	4	46	25	44	2nd		Not held			
1999	NSWSL	22	14	2	6	48	25	44	2nd	W	Not held			
2000	NSWSL	26	19	4	3	73	26	61	1st	W	Not held			
2000–01	NSWPL	18	12	3	3	47	28	39	1st	RU	Not held			
2001–02	NSWPL	22	13	5	4	51	26	44	3rd	RU	Not held			
2002–03	NSWPL	22	14	3	5	48	23	45	1st	RU	Not held			
2003–04	NSWPL	22	11	4	7	48	28	37	4th	SF	QF			
2004–05	NSWPL	22	13	6	3	38	28	41	3rd	SF	4R			
2006	NSWPL	18	14	2	2	47	15	44	1st	RU	W			
2007	NSWPL	18	11	5	2	38	19	38	1st	W	SF			
2008	NSWPL	22	3	7	12	14	40	16	12th	–	4R			
2009	NSWPL	22	7	7	8	29	31	28	7th	–	SF			
2010	NSWPL	22	12	4	6	42	27	40	2nd	W	SF		Tolgay Ozbey	23
2011	NSWPL	22	11	4	7	35	22	37	4th	PF	4R		Travis Major	7
2012	NSWPL	22	9	5	8	40	34	32	5th	PF	QF		Travis Major	9
2013	NPL NSW	22	10	6	6	44	32	36	6th	–	4R			
2014	NPL NSW	22	14	2	6	51	22	44	3rd	W	W	FFA Cup – R32	Travis Major	16
2015	NPL NSW	22	15	5	2	54	23	50	1st	RU	RU	NPL Finals – W, FFA Cup – R32		
2016	NPL NSW	22	14	3	5	47	26	45	2nd	W	SF	FFA Cup – QF		
2017	NPL NSW	22	14	5	3	45	22	47	2nd	SF	SF	FFA Cup – QF		
2018	NPL NSW	22	9	7	6	27	20	34	4th	QF	7R	–		
2019	NPL NSW	22	11	5	6	31	24	38	3rd	SF	6R	–		
2020	NPL NSW	11	4	3	4	19	15	15	6th	-	Not held	–		
2021	NPL NSW (Note: Season was cancelled due to COVID-19 pandemic. Results listed in italics at time of cancellation. No champion or premier was awarded.)	17	11	3	3	36	17	19	1st	Not held	Not held	FFA Cup – R32	Travis Major	12
2022	NPL NSW	22	12	4	6	43	25	18	3rd	W	6R	–	Jordan Smylie	10
2023	NPL NSW	30	17	6	7	59	33	57	3rd	Not held	4R			

Source ozfootball.net

=== Notes ===
Note 1: During 1984 to 1986, the league was split into two conferences – APIA played in the Northern Conference and the position in the table reflects position in the conference.
^{P} Draws went to penalty shoot-outs during the 1993–1995 seasons (2 points for win, 1 point for loss).
