= 2002–03 NSW Premier League season =

NSW Premier League
- Season: 2002–03
- Teams: 12
- Champions: APIA Leichhardt Tigers
- Premiers: Blacktown City
- Matches: 138
- Goals: 464 (3.36 per match)

The 2002–03 NSW Premier League season was the third season of the revamped NSW Premier League.

== Clubs ==
Teams promoted from Winter Super League:
(After the end of the 2002 season.)

- Rockdale City Suns

Teams relegated to Winter Super League:
(After the end of the 2001–02 season.)

- Sutherland Sharks

Club	Ground	Capacity
A.P.I.A. Leichhardt Tigers	Lambert Park	7,000
Bankstown City Lions	Jensen Oval	8,000
Belconnen Blue Devils	Belconnen Soccer Centre	2,000
Blacktown City Demons	Fairfax Community Stadium	7,500
Bonnyrigg White Eagles	Bonnyrigg Sports Club	10,000
Canterbury-Marrickville Olympic	The Crest Reserve	
Central Coast Coasties	Pluim Park	
Fairfield Bulls	Nineveh Stadium	1,000
Parramatta Eagles	Melita Stadium	10,000
Penrith Panthers	CUA Stadium	21,000
Rockdale City Suns	Rockdale Ilinden Sports Centre	5,000
St George Saints	St George Stadium	15,000

== Regular season ==
=== League table ===
Pos	Team	Pld	W	D	L	GF	GA	GD	Pts	Qualification
1	Blacktown City Demons	22	14	3	5	48	23	+25	45	Qualified for the Championship Finals series
2	APIA Leichhardt Tigers (C)	22	11	7	4	44	25	+19	40	Qualified for the Championship Finals series
3	Bonnyrigg White Eagles	22	11	5	6	47	35	+12	38	Qualified for the Championship Finals series
4	Belconnen Blue Devils	22	10	6	6	43	32	+11	36	Qualified for the Championship Finals series
5	Parramatta Eagles	22	9	7	6	37	30	+7	34	Qualified for the Championship Finals series
6	Rockdale City Suns	22	9	7	6	38	33	+5	34	
7	Canterbury-Marrickville	22	8	8	6	36	36	0	32	
8	Penrith Panthers	22	6	6	10	29	33	−4	24	
9	St George Saints	22	7	2	13	33	49	−16	23	
10	Bankstown City	22	6	5	11	28	45	−17	23	
11	Central Coast Coasties	22	6	3	13	33	63	−30	21	
12	Fairfield Bulls (R)	22	4	3	15	33	55	−22	15	Relegated to Super League

Source: OzFootball
Rules for classification: 1) points; 2) goal difference; 3) number of goals scored.
(C) Champions; (R) Relegated

=== Results ===
Home \ Away	API	BAN	BEL	BCD	BWE	CMO	CCC	FFB	PAR	PEN	ROC	SGS
APIA Leichhardt Tigers		2–1	1–0	0–2	1–0	0–0	5–1	9–2	1–1	3–1	1–2	2–2
Bankstown City	3–1		1–5	1–0	2–1	1–2	0–0	3–2	1–2	1–1	0–0	0–1
Belconnen Blue Devils	0–3	3–3		2–2	2–2	3–0	5–1	3–1	4–0	1–1	3–3	1–0
Blacktown City Demons	1–3	4–0	4–2		3–1	1–0	4–1	2–1	0–2	4–0	1–2	4–0
Bonnyrigg White Eagles	2–0	3–1	3–1	1–0		1–2	7–2	4–4	3–3	2–1	2–3	3–5
Canterbury-Marrickville Olympic	0–0	6–1	0–1	1–1	0–3		9–2	1–1	1–4	1–1	0–1	4–1
Central Coast Coasties	1–2	3–2	2–1	1–4	2–3	1–1		0–4	1–2	1–0	0–1	2–1
Fairfield Bulls	3–3	1–3	3–1	0–2	1–3	1–2	1–4		1–0	0–3	2–3	2–0
Parramatta Eagles	0–1	1–1	0–0	2–3	1–1	0–3	1–1	2–1		0–0	2–3	4–0
Penrith Panthers	2–2	2–0	0–1	1–2	0–1	0–1	3–1	2–1	2–3		3–3	3–1
Rockdale City Suns	1–1	4–1	1–1	1–2	1–1	1–1	0–2	2–1	2–4	0–1		3–3
St George Saints	0–3	1–2	1–2	0–2	2–0	1–0	7–4	3–0	0–3	4–2	0–3	

Updated to match(es) played on 31 May 2003. Source: socceraust.co.uk
Legend: Blue = home team win; Yellow = draw; Red = away team win.

== Finals series ==
Qualifying Finals
2	APIA Leichhardt	3
3	Bonnyrigg	0
4	Belconnen	1
5	Parramatta Eagles	0

Semi-finals
1	Blacktown City	1
2	APIA Leichhardt	2
3	Bonnyrigg	2
4	Belconnen	0

Preliminary finals
1	Blacktown City (p)	1(8)
3	Bonnyrigg	1(7)

Grand final
2	APIA Leichhardt	3
1	Blacktown City	1

=== Qualifying Finals ===
10 May 2003 Elimination final	Belconnen Blue Devils	1–0	Parramatta Eagles	Canberra, Australia
Saturday	Daniel Macor 61'	Report		Stadium: Belconnen Soccer Centre; Referee: Simon Przydacz

11 May 2003 Qualifying Final	APIA Leichhardt Tigers	3–0	Bonnyrigg White Eagles	Sydney, Australia
Sunday	Damon Langan 33'; Norman Tome 63', 90+3'	Report		Stadium: Lambert Park; Referee: Craig Pearce

=== Semi-finals ===
17 May 2003 Major semi-final	Blacktown City Demons	1–2	APIA Leichhardt Tigers	Sydney, Australia
Saturday	N. Imaya 66'	Report	D. Langan 24', 37' (pen.)	Stadium: Gabbie Stadium; Referee: Nick Asargiotis

18 May 2003 Minor semi-final	Belconnen Blue Devils	0–2	Bonnyrigg White Eagles	Sydney, Australia
Sunday		Report	Shane Knight 15'; Aaron Burgess 28'	Stadium: Gabbie Stadium; Referee: Mark Hester

=== Preliminary final ===
24 May 2003	Bonnyrigg White Eagles	1–1 (a.e.t.) (8–9 p)	Blacktown City Demons	Sydney, Australia
Saturday	Aaron Burgess 19'	Report	Damien Foxe 90'	Stadium: Gabbie Stadium; Referee: Vic Gauci

=== Grand final ===
31 May 2003	APIA Leichhardt Tigers	3–1	Blacktown City Demons	Sydney, Australia
	Arambasic 35' (pen.), 53', 63'	Report	Reid 39'	Stadium: Lambert Park; Attendance: 4,000; Referee: Greg Leverton

== See also ==
- NSW Premier League
- Football NSW
