= 1999 Soccer NSW season =

Soccer NSW
- Season: 1999
- Champions: Blacktown City FC

The Soccer NSW 1999 season was the 43rd season of football in New South Wales since the formation of NSW Federation of Soccer Clubs in 1957. It was the eighth time the premier division was named the "Super League" and the second division was named "Division 1". There were 24 teams competing across both divisions, with 12 teams in each league.

== Competitions ==
=== 1999 Super League ===
Super League
- Season: 1999
- Champions: Blacktown City Demons
- Premiers: Bonnyrigg White Eagles
- Relegated: Ryde City

The 1999 Super League season was played over 22 rounds, with the regular season from February to July 1999.

==== League table ====
Pos	Team	Pld	W	D	L	GF	GA	GD	Pts	Qualification or relegation
1	Bonnyrigg White Eagles	22	15	1	6	65	37	+28	46	1999 Soccer NSW Finals
2	Blacktown City Demons (C)	22	14	2	6	48	26	+22	44	1999 Soccer NSW Finals
3	Macarthur Rams	22	14	1	7	40	24	+16	43	1999 Soccer NSW Finals
4	Parramatta Eagles	22	13	2	7	46	23	+23	41	1999 Soccer NSW Finals
5	Bankstown City Lions	22	13	1	8	43	31	+12	40	1999 Soccer NSW Finals
6	Fairfield Bulls	22	11	3	8	45	38	+7	36	
7	A.P.I.A. Leichhardt Tigers	22	11	2	9	43	37	+6	35	
8	Canterbury Marrickville Olympic	22	10	4	8	33	36	−3	34	
9	Ryde City (R)	22	4	6	12	26	37	−11	18	Relegation to Division One for next season.
10	Central Coast Coasties	22	4	5	13	17	44	−27	17	
11	Sutherland Sharks	22	4	3	15	20	55	−35	15	
12	Eastern Suburbs	22	3	2	17	24	62	−38	11	

Source: socceraust.co.uk
Rules for classification: 1) points; 2) goal difference; 3) number of goals scored.
(C) Champions; (R) Relegated

==== Finals ====
Qualifying Finals
2	Blacktown City Demons	2
3	Macarthur Rams	1
4	Parramatta Eagles	3
5	Bankstown City Lions	0

Semi-finals
1	Bonnyrigg White Eagles	2
2	Blacktown City Demons	5
3	Macarthur Rams	2
4	Parramatta Eagles (a.e.t.)	3

Preliminary Finals
1	Bonnyrigg White Eagles	2
4	Parramatta Eagles	3

Grand Final
2	Blacktown City Demons	5
4	Parramatta Eagles	1

=== 1999 NSW Division One ===
NSW Division One
- Season: 1999
- Champions: Manly-Warringah Dolphins
- Promoted: Manly-Warringah Dolphins; Penrith Panthers SC; St George Saints

The 1999 NSW Division One season was played over 22 rounds, with the regular season starting in March.

==== League table ====
Pos	Team	Pld	W	D	L	GF	GA	GD	Pts	Qualification or relegation
1	Manly-Warringah Dolphins (P)	22	14	3	5	63	21	+42	45	Promotion to the 2000 NSW Super League season
2	St George Saints (P)	22	11	6	5	40	25	+15	39	Promotion to the 2000 NSW Super League season
3	Stanmore Hawks	22	12	3	7	41	30	+11	39	Qualification for the Finals series
4	Illawarra Lions	22	12	2	8	42	34	+8	38	Qualification for the Finals series
5	Penrith Panthers (C, P)	22	10	6	6	36	23	+13	36	Promotion to the 2000 NSW Super League season
6	Rockdale City Suns	22	10	2	10	50	41	+9	32	
7	Auburn United	22	10	0	12	34	44	−10	30	
8	Hurstville City Minotaurs	22	9	1	12	36	45	−9	28	
9	Bathurst '75	22	7	6	9	30	38	−8	27	
10	AC United	22	7	5	10	35	51	−16	26	
11	Moorebank Sports	22	5	5	12	18	45	−27	20	
12	Dulwich Hill SC	22	3	5	14	25	53	−28	14	

Source: socceraust.co.uk
Rules for classification: 1) points; 2) goal difference; 3) number of goals scored.
(C) Champions; (P) Promoted

==== Finals ====
Results unknown. Penrith Panthers won and were promoted for next season.
