= 2001–02 NSW Premier League season =

NSW Premier League
- Season: 2001–02
- Teams: 12
- Champions: Parramatta Eagles
- Premiers: Parramatta Eagles
- Matches: 138
- Goals: 474 (3.43 per match)

The 2001–02 NSW Premier League season was the second season of the revamped NSW Premier League. From the original ten teams in the inaugural version of the Premier League, two more were added for the follow-up tournament. They were Bankstown City Lions and Fairfield Bulls.

The Parramatta Eagles took out the double winning the Championship and the Premiership.

== Clubs ==
Teams promoted from Super League:
(After the end of the 2001 season.)

- Bankstown City Lions
- Fairfield Bulls

Teams relegated to Super League:
(After the end of the 2000–01 season.)

- Nil

Club	Ground	Capacity
A.P.I.A. Leichhardt Tigers	Lambert Park	7,000
Bankstown City Lions FC	Jensen Oval	8,000
Belconnen Blue Devils	Belconnen Soccer Centre	2,000
Blacktown City Demons FC	Fairfax Community Stadium	7,500
Bonnyrigg White Eagles FC	Bonnyrigg Sports Club	10,000
Canterbury-Marrickville	The Crest Reserve	
Central Coast	Pluim Park	
Fairfield Bulls	Nineveh Soccer Stadium	1,000
Parramatta Eagles	Melita Stadium	10,000
Penrith Panthers	CUA Stadium	21,000
St George Saints	St George Stadium	15,000
Sutherland Sharks	Seymour Shaw Park	5,000

== Regular season ==
=== League table ===
Pos	Team	Pld	W	D	L	GF	GA	GD	Pts	Qualification or relegation
1	Parramatta FC (C)	22	17	1	4	61	23	+38	52	Qualified for the Championship Finals series
2	Bonnyrigg White Eagles	22	15	2	5	59	21	+38	47	Qualified for the Championship Finals series
3	Blacktown City	22	13	5	4	51	26	+25	44	Qualified for the Championship Finals series
4	APIA Leichhardt Tigers	22	12	5	5	40	29	+11	41	Qualified for the Championship Finals series
5	Belconnen Blue Devils	22	12	4	6	44	31	+13	40	Qualified for the Championship Finals series
6	Fairfield Bulls	22	12	4	6	50	43	+7	40	
7	Bankstown City	22	10	5	7	51	48	+3	35	
8	Central Coast FC	22	4	6	12	21	41	−20	18	
9	Canterbury-Marrickville	22	5	3	14	25	49	−24	18	
10	St George FC	22	4	5	13	27	52	−25	17	
11	Penrith Nepean United	22	1	8	13	24	45	−21	11	
12	Sutherland Sharks (R)	22	1	4	17	21	66	−45	7	Relegated to Super League

Source: OzFootball
Rules for classification: 1) points; 2) goal difference; 3) number of goals scored.
(C) Champions; (R) Relegated

=== Results ===
Home \ Away	API	BAN	BEL	BCD	BWE	CMO	CCC	FFB	PAR	PEN	SGS	SUT
APIA Leichhardt Tigers		1–1	0–0	0–2	1–0	2–0	4–0	3–3	1–4	2–2	1–0	2–1
Bankstown City	1–3		6–0	4–3	0–5	1–2	1–0	1–2	2–2	2–2	1–0	6–0
Belconnen Blue Devils	2–3	2–3		0–1	3–1	3–0	2–0	4–4	3–2	4–2	2–0	3–2
Blacktown City Demons	1–2	3–1	0–0		1–2	1–1	4–0	3–2	3–1	2–0	8–1	2–2
Bonnyrigg White Eagles	5–0	4–0	3–2	1–2		7–0	2–1	0–1	4–3	2–1	3–2	1–0
Canterbury-Marrickville Olympic	0–1	3–5	0–1	5–2	0–1		0–2	0–1	0–4	3–2	0–1	3–1
Central Coast Coasties	0–3	2–2	1–3	0–0	0–5	3–1		0–1	2–3	1–1	1–1	4–0
Fairfield Bulls	0–3	2–3	2–2	2–6	1–1	1–0	4–2		0–1	2–0	7–3	6–3
Parramatta Eagles	2–0	4–0	1–0	1–2	1–0	5–1	4–0	4–1		2–1	3–0	3–1
Penrith Panthers	1–1	2–3	0–2	1–1	0–6	2–2	0–1	2–3	1–2		0–2	3–1
St George Saints	3–2	4–4	0–3	0–2	0–5	1–1	0–0	2–3	1–3	1–1		4–0
Sutherland Sharks	1–5	2–4	0–3	0–2	2–2	2–3	1–1	0–2	0–6	0–0	2–1	

Updated to match(es) played on 6 April 2002. Source:
Legend: Blue = home team win; Yellow = draw; Red = away team win.

== Finals series ==
Qualifying Finals
2	Bonnyrigg White Eagles	3
3	Blacktown City	1
4	APIA Leichhardt	0
5	Belconnen Blue Devils	1

Semi-finals
1	Parramatta Eagles	2
2	Bonnyrigg White Eagles	0
3	Blacktown City	2
5	Belconnen Blue Devils	0

Preliminary finals
3	Blacktown City	5
2	Bonnyrigg White Eagles	1

Grand final
1	Parramatta Eagles	1
3	Blacktown City	0

=== Qualifying Finals ===
13 April 2002 Elimination final	APIA Leichhardt Tigers	0–1	Belconnen Blue Devils	Sydney, Australia
Saturday		Report

13 April 2002 Qualifying Final	Bonnyrigg White Eagles	3–1	Blacktown City Demons	Sydney, Australia
Saturday		Report

=== Semi-finals ===
20 April 2002 Minor semi-final	Belconnen Blue Devils	0–2	Blacktown City Demons	Canberra, ACT
Saturday		Report

20 April 2002 Major semi-final	Parramatta Eagles	2–0	Bonnyrigg White Eagles	Sydney, Australia
Saturday		Report

=== Preliminary final ===
27 April 2002	Blacktown City Demons	5–1	Bonnyrigg White Eagles	Sydney, Australia
Saturday		Report

=== Grand final ===
27 April 2002	Parramatta Eagles	1–0	Blacktown City Demons	Sydney, Australia
Saturday		Report

== See also ==
- NSW Premier League
- Football NSW
