= 2006 NSW Premier League season =

2006 NSW Premier League
- League: NSW Premier League
- Sport: Association football
- Duration: 17 February 2006 – 16 July 2006
- Teams: 10

2006
- Champions: Blacktown City Demons FC
- Premiers: Sydney United FC

Waratah Cup
- Champions: Blacktown City Demons FC

NSW Premier League seasons
- ← 2004–05 2007 →

The 2006 NSW Premier League season was the sixth season of the revamped NSW Premier League.

The 2006 regular season began on Friday, 17 February 2006 in a match between Manly United and APIA Leichhardt Tigers. It concluded with Round 18 being played out on Sunday, 25 June 2006. The finals began on 1 July 2006, culminating with the grand final on 16 July 2006. The match was played at Marconi Stadium at 3pm with Sydney United FC being crowned premiers after defeating regular season champions Blacktown City Demons FC 4–0.

During the course of the season, all Premier League, Super League and Division teams were involved in the Statewide Cup, an equivalent to the English FA Cup with teams competing in a series of elimination games. Blacktown City Demons FC also won this competition defeating APIA Leichhardt Tigers 2–1 in the cup final.

== Clubs ==
Teams promoted from Super League:
(After the end of the 2004–05 season.)

- None

Teams relegated to Super League:
(After the end of the 2004–05 season.)

- Bonnyrigg White Eagles FC
- St George FC
- Rockdale City Suns FC
- Penrith Nepean United FC
- Central Coast United
- Sydney Crescent Star

Club	Ground	Capacity
APIA Leichhardt Tigers	Leichhardt Oval	20,000
Bankstown City Lions FC	Jensen Oval	8,000
Blacktown City Demons FC	Fairfax Community Stadium	7,500
Manly United FC	Cromer Park	5,000
Marconi Stallions FC	Marconi Stadium	11,500
Parramatta Eagles	Melita Stadium	21,000
Sutherland Sharks FC	Seymour Shaw Park	5,000
Sydney Olympic FC	Belmore Sports Ground	25,000
Sydney United FC	Sydney United Sports Centre	12,000
Wollongong Wolves	Hooka Creek Park	5,000

== Regular season ==
=== League table ===
Pos	Team	Pld	W	D	L	GF	GA	GD	Pts	Qualification or relegation
1	Blacktown City	18	14	2	2	47	15	+32	44	Qualified for the Championship Finals Series
2	Bankstown City	18	10	3	5	35	28	+7	33	Qualified for the Championship Finals Series
3	Marconi Stallions	18	10	2	6	42	25	+17	32	Qualified for the Championship Finals Series
4	Sydney United (C)	18	9	4	5	33	22	+11	31	Qualified for the Championship Finals Series
5	Manly United	18	8	4	6	31	24	+7	28	
6	Sydney Olympic	18	6	3	9	24	35	−11	21	
7	Parramatta Eagles (R)	18	5	4	9	18	25	−7	19	Relegated to 2007 NSW Super League
8	Sutherland Sharks	18	5	3	10	26	40	−14	18	
9	Wollongong Wolves	18	5	1	12	26	46	−20	16	
10	APIA Leichhardt Tigers	18	3	4	11	16	38	−22	13	

Source: SoccerAust
Rules for classification: 1) points; 2) goal difference; 3) number of goals scored.
(C) Champions; (R) Relegated

=== Results ===
Home \ Away	API	BAN	BCD	MAN	MAR	PAR	SUT	SYO	SYU	WGW
APIA Leichhardt Tigers		0–2	0–5	2–1	0–5	1–1	2–3	0–1	1–2	3–0
Bankstown City	0–0		1–0	1–1	2–1	1–2	4–1	2–3	4–3	2–3
Blacktown City Demons	3–0	1–1		5–2	1–0	3–1	5–2	3–1	3–1	6–1
Manly United	2–2	4–1	0–0		1–2	2–0	1–3	1–0	1–0	5–1
Marconi Stallions	5–1	2–4	3–1	2–0		0–1	1–2	1–1	1–1	5–3
Parramatta Eagles	1–0	1–3	0–1	2–2	2–3		1–0	4–0	1–2	0–4
Sutherland Sharks	4–0	1–2	1–4	0–2	1–4	1–1		1–2	0–2	1–2
Sydney Olympic	3–2	1–2	0–2	0–2	1–4	1–0	2–2		3–4	1–2
Sydney United	0–0	2–0	1–2	2–1	1–3	0–0	4–0	1–1		2–0
Wollongong Wolves	0–2	2–3	0–2	1–3	2–0	0–1	2–2	2–3	1–5	

Updated to match(es) played on 25 June 2006. Source: socceraust.co.uk
Legend: Blue = home team win; Yellow = draw; Red = away team win.

== Finals series ==
After the home and away season, the finals series began with the top four teams competing for the champions trophy. The finals series used a Page playoff system. The winner of the finals series, Sydney United FC was crowned as the NSW Premier League champions.

Standard cup rules – such as extra time and penalty shootouts were used to decide drawn games.

Semifinals
Blacktown City	2
Bankstown City	0
Marconi Stallions	0
Sydney United	3

Preliminary final
2	Bankstown City	1 (5)
4	Sydney United (p)	1 (6)

Final
1	Blacktown City	0
4	Sydney United	4

=== Semi-finals ===
1 July 2006 Major semi-final	Blacktown City Demons	2–0	Bankstown City Lions	Seven Hills, Sydney
Saturday, 17:00	Ozbey 9', 87' (pen.)	Report		Stadium: Fairfax Community Stadium

2 July 2006 Minor semi-final	Marconi Stallions	0–3	Sydney United	Bossley Park, Sydney
Sunday, 15:00		Report	Glavas 26', 53'; Martin 89'	Stadium: Marconi Stadium

=== Preliminary final ===
9 July 2006	Sydney United	1–1 (a.e.t.) (6–5 p)	Bankstown City Lions	Sefton, Sydney
Sunday, 16:00	C. Nwaogazi 59'	Report	Glavas 85'	Stadium: Melita Stadium

=== Grand final ===
16 July 2006	Blacktown City Demons	0–4	Sydney United	Bossley Park, Sydney
Sunday, 15:00		Report	Glavas 10', 25', 50' (pen.), 77'	Stadium: Marconi Stadium

== See also ==
- Football NSW
