= 1981 Blacktown City FC season =

2nd season in existence of Blacktown City FC in the National Soccer League

Blacktown City
1981 season
- Manager: Rale Rasic
- Stadium: Gabbie Stadium
- National Soccer League: 15th
- NSL Cup: First round
- Top goalscorer: League: Paul Burrows; Jovan Djordjevic; Peter Jones; Brian O'Donnell (4 each); All: Paul Burrows; Jovan Djordjevic; Peter Jones; Brian O'Donnell (4 each)
- Highest home attendance: 4,462 vs. Sydney Olympic (23 August 1981); National Soccer League
- Lowest home attendance: 1,200 vs. Sydney City (15 July 1981); National Soccer League
- Average home league attendance: 2,753
- Biggest win: 4–0 vs. West Adelaide (7 June 1981); National Soccer League
- Biggest defeat: 1–5 vs. Adelaide City (12 April 1981); National Soccer League
Home colours	Away colours

The 1981 season was the second in the National Soccer League for Blacktown City Football Club. In addition to the domestic league, they also participated in the NSL Cup. Blacktown City finished 15th in their National Soccer League season, and were eliminated in the first round of the NSL Cup.

== Players ==
Note: Flags indicate national team as defined under FIFA eligibility rules; some limited exceptions apply. Players may hold more than one non-FIFA nationality.

No.	Pos.	Nation	Player
1	GK	AUS	Bruce James
2	DF	AUS	Robert Wheatley
3	DF	AUS	Steve Pollard
4	DF	AUS	Milan Milovanovic
5	DF	AUS	Cliff Pointer
6	MF	AUS	Stuart Selvage
7	FW	YUG	Jovan Djordjevic
8	MF	CHI	Ricky Hormazabal
9	MF	YUG	Branko Culina
10	MF	AUS	Brian O'Donnell
11	FW	AUS	Paul Burrows
12	MF	AUS	Michael Quarmby

No.	Pos.	Nation	Player
13	DF	AUS	Peter Cuk
14	MF	CHI	Carlos Ortega
15	DF	AUS	Tony Rasmussen
16	FW	AUS	Craig Wallace
17	FW	AUS	Peter Jones
18	MF	AUS	Dean Milosevic
20	GK	AUS	Barry Hoare
—	GK	AUS	Peter Freeman
—	MF	YUG	Branislav Krstic
—	MF	AUS	Neil Manning
—	FW	AUS	Neil Pearson

== Competitions ==
=== Overall record ===
Competition	First match	Last match	Starting round	Final position	Record							
Competition	First match	Last match	Starting round	Final position	Pld	W	D	L	GF	GA	GD	Win %
National Soccer League	14 February 1981	13 September 1981	Matchday 1	15th	30	6	9	15	32	47	−15	20.00
NSL Cup	22 March 1981		First round	First round	1	0	0	1	0	3	−3	0.00
Total					31	6	9	16	32	50	−18	19.35

Source: Competitions

=== National Soccer League ===
==== League table ====
Pos	Team	Pld	W	D	L	GF	GA	GD	Pts	Relegation
1	Sydney City (C)	30	19	5	6	59	30	+29	43	
2	South Melbourne	30	13	13	4	41	27	+14	39	
3	Brisbane City	30	12	11	7	37	25	+12	35	
4	APIA Leichhardt	30	12	11	7	39	33	+6	35	
5	Canberra City	30	13	7	10	41	32	+9	33	
6	Brisbane Lions	30	11	11	8	41	33	+8	33	
7	Adelaide City	30	13	6	11	46	42	+4	32	
8	Heidelberg United	30	12	7	11	48	40	+8	31	
9	Sydney Olympic	30	11	9	10	46	46	0	31	
10	Newcastle KB United	30	11	8	11	41	41	0	30	
11	Wollongong City	30	8	12	10	35	39	−4	28	
12	Preston Makedonia	30	9	7	14	39	41	−2	25	
13	Footscray JUST	30	9	7	14	32	48	−16	25	
14	Marconi Fairfield	30	9	7	14	23	45	−22	25	
15	Blacktown City (R)	30	6	9	15	32	47	−15	21	Relegated to the 1982 NSW State League
16	West Adelaide	30	5	4	21	26	57	−31	14	

Updated to match(es) played on unknown. Source: rsssf.com
Rules for classification: 1) points; 2) goal difference; 3) number of goals scored.
(C) Champions; (R) Relegated

==== Results summary ====
Overall								Home						Away					
Pld	W	D	L	GF	GA	GD	Pts	W	D	L	GF	GA	GD	W	D	L	GF	GA	GD
30	6	9	15	32	47	−15	27	3	4	8	17	25	−8	3	5	7	15	22	−7

Source: worldfootball.net

==== Results by round ====
Round	1	2	3	4	5	6	7	8	9	11	12	13	14	15	16	17	18	19	20	21	10	22	23	24	25	26	27	28	29	30
Ground	H	A	A	H	A	H	A	H	A	A	H	A	H	A	H	H	A	H	A	H	H	A	H	A	H	A	H	A	H	A
Result	D	L	D	L	D	D	W	L	L	D	L	L	W	L	W	L	L	L	L	D	W	D	L	D	L	W	L	L	D	W
Position	7	14	12	13	13	13	11	13	13	13	14	14	13	13	12	12	13	13	14	14	13	15	15	15	15	15	15	15	15	15
Points	1	1	2	2	3	4	6	6	6	7	7	7	9	9	11	11	11	11	11	12	14	15	15	16	16	18	18	18	19	21

Source: worldfootball.net
A = Away; H = Home; W = Win; D = Draw; L = Loss

==== Matches ====
Win Draw Loss

14 February 1981 1	Blacktown City	2–2	Brisbane Lions	Sydney
	O'Donnell 28' (pen.); Hormazabal 62'	Report	Hogg 45'; Bennett 83'	Stadium: Gabbie Stadium; Attendance: 2,138; Referee: Tim Davies

22 February 1981 2	West Adelaide	2–0	Blacktown City	Adelaide
	McGregor 20'; Boyle 80'	Report		Stadium: Hindmarsh Stadium; Attendance: 2,700; Referee: Graham Neal

1 March 1981 3	Newcastle KB United	1–1	Blacktown City	Newcastle
	Drinkwater 45'	Report	Selvage 41'	Stadium: Newcastle International Sports Centre; Attendance: 6,343; Referee: Chris Bambridge

8 March 1981 4	Blacktown City	0–1	APIA Leichhardt	Sydney
		Report	O'Connor 15'	Stadium: Gabbie Stadium; Attendance: 2,543; Referee: Ken Small

15 March 1981 5	Wollongong City	1–1	Blacktown City	Wollongong
	Fleming 41'	Report	Culina 86'	Stadium: Wollongong Showground; Attendance: 5,637; Referee: Richard Lorenc

28 March 1981 6	Blacktown City	2–2	South Melbourne	Sydney
	Culina 33'; Cuk 65'	Report	Evans 9'; Cummings 86'	Stadium: Gabbie Stadium; Attendance: 2,451; Referee: Tim Davies

5 April 1981 7	Preston Makedonia	2–3	Blacktown City	Melbourne
	Ollerton 49', 65'	Report	Cuk 22'; Wallace 54', 74'	Stadium: B.T. Connor Reserve; Attendance: 3,500; Referee: David Yelland

12 April 1981 8	Blacktown City	1–5	Adelaide City	Sydney
	Cuk 24'	Report	Mitchell 4', 76'; J. Nyskohus 30'; Russell 60'; Northcote 66'	Stadium: Gabbie Stadium; Attendance: 2,348; Referee: Doug Rennie

18 April 1981 9	Brisbane City	2–1	Blacktown City	Brisbane
	Hamilton 43', 87'	Report	Culina 85'	Stadium: Spencer Park; Attendance: 2,000; Referee: Des Miles

3 May 1981 11	Canberra City	2–2	Blacktown City	Canberra
	J. O'Shea 15'; Byrne 50'	Report	Burrows 18', 34'	Stadium: Bruce Stadium; Attendance: 5,750; Referee: Ken Allen

10 May 1981 12	Blacktown City	0–2	Marconi Fairield	Sydney
		Report	Picioane 61'; Sharne 88'	Stadium: Gabbie Stadium; Attendance: 3,180; Referee: Tony Boskovic

17 May 1981 13	Sydney Olympic	1–0	Blacktown City	Sydney
	Wilson 88' (pen.)	Report		Stadium: Pratten Park; Attendance: 5,200; Referee: Henry Witschge

24 May 1981 14	Blacktown City	3–1	Heidelberg United	Sydney
	O'Donnell 53' (pen.); Djordjevic 64'; Burrows 68'	Report	Rooney 14'	Stadium: Gabbie Stadium; Attendance: 2,876; Referee: Tim Davies

31 May 1981 15	Footscray JUST	2–0	Blacktown City	Melbourne
	Ilioski 53'; Kakantonis 85'	Report		Stadium: Schintler Reserve; Attendance: 2,300; Referee: Jim Fearn

7 June 1981 16	Blacktown City	4–0	West Adelaide	Sydney
	Burrows 11'; Djordjevic 73'; Jones 80'; Pointer 89'	Report		Stadium: Gabbie Stadium; Attendance: 2,786; Referee: Ken Small

14 June 1981 17	Blacktown City	1–2	Newcastle KB United	Sydney
	Jones 81'	Report	Heys 13'; Tredinnick 36'	Stadium: Gabbie Stadium; Attendance: 3,348; Referee: Richard Lorenc

21 June 1981 18	APIA Leichhardt	3–2	Blacktown City	Sydney
	Bradley 13'; Hughes 25'; O'Connor 35'	Report	Djordjevic 43'; Turner 56' (pen.)	Stadium: Lambert Park; Attendance: 4,096; Referee: Jim Reeves

28 June 1981 19	Blacktown City	0–1	Wollongong City	Sydney
		Report	Tredinnick 76'	Stadium: Gabbie Stadium; Attendance: 2,965; Referee: Jim Reeves

5 July 1981 20	South Melbourne	2–1	Blacktown City	Melbourne
	Hormazabal 62' (o.g.); Bannon 70'	Report	Jones 79'	Stadium: Middle Park Soccer Stadium; Attendance: 4,000; Referee: Dennis Yelland

12 July 1981 21	Blacktown City	0–0	Preston Makedonia	Sydney
		Report		Stadium: Gabbie Stadium; Attendance: 3,067; Referee: Doug Rennie

15 July 1981 10	Blacktown City	1–0	Sydney City	Sydney
	Krstic 21'	Report		Stadium: Marconi Oval; Attendance: 1,200; Referee: Gary Power

19 July 1981 22	Adelaide City	0–0	Blacktown City	Adelaide
		Report		Stadium: Olympic Sports Field; Attendance: 3,700; Referee: Bob Kerr

26 July 1981 23	Blacktown City	1–2	Brisbane City	Sydney
	O'DOnnell 44' (pen.)	Report	Kelso 33'; Conner 79'	Stadium: Gabbie Stadium; Attendance: 3,144; Referee: Tony Boskovic

2 August 1981 24	Sydney City	1–1	Blacktown City	Sydney
	Souness 47'	Report	Jones 61'	Stadium: ES Marks Athletics Field; Attendance: 1,452; Referee: Ken Small

9 August 1981 25	Blacktown City	0–2	Canberra City	Sydney
		Report	Cole 17'; Valeri 19'	Stadium: Gabbie Stadium; Attendance: 2,740; Referee: Tim Davies

16 August 1981 26	Marconi Fairfield	0–1	Blacktown City	Sydney
		Report	O'Donnell 69'	Stadium: Marconi Stadium; Attendance: 2,100; Referee: Doug Rennie

23 August 1981 27	Blacktown City	1–4	Sydney Olympic	Sydney
	Djordjevic 90'	Report	Koussas 27', 38'; Redfern 43'; Gavin 62'	Stadium: Gabbie Stadium; Attendance: 4,462; Referee: Bob Mee

30 August 1981 28	Heidelberg United	3–1	Blacktown City	Melbourne
	Yankos 13'; Selemidis 17'; Cole 82'	Report	Rasmussen 79'	Stadium: Olympic Park; Attendance: 2,000; Referee: Barry Harwood

6 September 1981 29	Blacktown City	1–1	Footscray JUST	Sydney
	Krstic 90'	Report	Boland 27' (pen.)	Stadium: Gabbie Stadium; Attendance: 2,040; Referee: Jim Reeves

13 September 1981 30	Brisbane Lions	0–1	Blacktown City	Brisbane
		Report	Turner 30'	Stadium: Richlands Stadium; Attendance: 1,000; Referee: Col Amos

=== NSL Cup ===
Win Draw Loss

22 March 1981 First round	Sydney City	3–0	Blacktown City	Newcastle
	Boden 28' (pen.), 37', 86'	Report		Stadium: Newcastle International Sports Centre; Attendance: 1,310; Referee: Alf Rodway

== Statistics ==
=== Appearances and goals ===
Includes all competitions. Players with no appearances not included in the list.

No.	Pos.	Nat.	Player	National Soccer League		NSL Cup		Total	
No.	Pos.	Nat.	Player	Apps	Goals	Apps	Goals	Apps	Goals
1	GK	(Australia)	Bruce James	29	0	1	0	30	0
2	DF	(Australia)	Robert Wheatley	21+3	0	1	0	25	0
3	DF	(Australia)	Steve Pollard	8	0	1	0	9	0
4	DF	(Australia)	Milan Milovanovic	23	0	1	0	24	0
5	DF	(Australia)	Cliff Pointer	30	1	1	0	31	1
6	MF	(Australia)	Stuart Selvage	30	1	1	0	31	1
7	FW	(Socialist Federal Republic of Yugoslavia)	Jovan Djordjevic	24	4	0	0	24	4
8	MF	(Chile)	Ricky Hormazabal	22	1	1	0	23	1
9	MF	(Socialist Federal Republic of Yugoslavia)	Branko Culina	18+2	3	1	0	21	3
10	MF	(Australia)	Brian O'Donnell	30	4	1	0	31	4
11	FW	(Australia)	Paul Burrows	23	4	1	0	24	4
12	MF	(Australia)	Michael Quarmby	0+1	0	0	0	1	0
13	DF	(Australia)	Peter Cuk	8+8	3	0+1	0	17	3
14	MF	(Chile)	Carlos Ortega	2+1	0	0	0	3	0
15	DF	(Australia)	Tony Rasmussen	17+5	1	0+1	0	23	1
16	FW	(Australia)	Craig Wallace	7+3	2	1	0	11	2
17	FW	(Australia)	Peter Jones	12+4	4	0	0	16	4
18	MF	(Australia)	Dean Milosevic	4+5	0	0	0	9	0
20	GK	(Australia)	Barry Hoare	1	0	0	0	1	0
—	MF	(Socialist Federal Republic of Yugoslavia)	Branislav Krstic	11	2	0	0	11	2
—	FW	(Australia)	Neil Pearson	0+1	0	0	0	1	0
Player(s) transferred out but featured this season
19	FW	(New Zealand)	Brian Turner	10+1	2	0	0	11	2

=== Disciplinary record ===
Includes all competitions. The list is sorted by squad number when total cards are equal. Players with no cards not included in the list.

Rank	No.	Pos.	Nat.	Player	National Soccer League			NSL Cup			Total		
Rank	No.	Pos.	Nat.	Player	Yellow card	Second yellow card	Red card	Yellow card	Second yellow card	Red card	Yellow card	Second yellow card	Red card
1	8	MF	(Chile)	Ricky Hormazabal	6	0	0	1	0	1	7	0	1
2	4	DF	(Australia)	Milan Milovanovic	3	0	1	0	0	0	3	0	1
3	15	DF	(Australia)	Tony Rasmussen	7	0	0	1	0	0	8	0	0
4	11	FW	(Australia)	Paul Burrows	5	0	0	1	0	0	6	0	0
5	3	DF	(Australia)	Steve Pollard	3	0	0	0	0	0	3	0	0
5	5	DF	(Australia)	Cliff Pointer	3	0	0	0	0	0	3	0	0
5	7	FW	(Socialist Federal Republic of Yugoslavia)	Jovan Djordjevic	3	0	0	0	0	0	3	0	0
5	17	FW	(Australia)	Peter Jones	3	0	0	0	0	0	3	0	0
9	1	GK	(Australia)	Bruce James	2	0	0	0	0	0	2	0	0
9	16	FW	(Australia)	Craig Wallace	2	0	0	0	0	0	2	0	0
11	2	DF	(Australia)	Robert Wheatley	1	0	0	0	0	0	1	0	0
11	9	MF	(Socialist Federal Republic of Yugoslavia)	Branko Culina	1	0	0	0	0	0	1	0	0
11	10	MF	(Australia)	Brian O'Donnell	1	0	0	0	0	0	1	0	0
11	13	DF	(Australia)	Peter Cuk	1	0	0	0	0	0	1	0	0
11	18	MF	(Australia)	Dean Milosevic	1	0	0	0	0	0	1	0	0
11	—	MF	(Socialist Federal Republic of Yugoslavia)	Branislav Krstic	1	0	0	0	0	0	1	0	0
Total					43	0	1	3	0	1	46	0	2

=== Clean sheets ===
Includes all competitions. The list is sorted by squad number when total clean sheets are equal. Numbers in parentheses represent games where both goalkeepers participated and both kept a clean sheet; the number in parentheses is awarded to the goalkeeper who was substituted on, whilst a full clean sheet is awarded to the goalkeeper who was on the field at the start of play. Goalkeepers with no clean sheets not included in the list.

Rank	No.	Nat.	Goalkeeper	NSL	NSL Cup	Total
1	1	(Australia)	Bruce James	6	0	6
Total				6	0	6
