= 2000 Soccer NSW season =

Soccer NSW
- Season: 2000
- Champions: Blacktown City Demons

The Soccer NSW 2000 season was the 44th season of football in New South Wales since the formation of NSW Federation of Soccer Clubs in 1957. It was the ninth and final time the premier division was named the "Super League" and the second division was named "Division One". There were 26 teams competing across both divisions, with 14 teams in the Super League and 12 teams in Division One. At the end of the season the Super League was rebranded as the NSW Premier League and played over the summer months and began in late 2000. This was so that it would be aligned with the National Soccer League. Division One was renamed the NSW Winter Super League and began in 2001.

== Competitions ==
=== 2000 Super League ===
Super League
- Season: 2000
- Champions: Blacktown City Demons
- Premiers: Blacktown City Demons
- Relegated: N/A

The 2000 Super League season was played over 26 rounds, with the regular season from January to July 2000.

==== League table ====
| Pos | Team | Pld | W | D | L | GF | GA | GD | Pts | Qualification or relegation |
|---|---|---|---|---|---|---|---|---|---|---|
| 1 | Blacktown City Demons (C) | 26 | 19 | 4 | 3 | 73 | 26 | +47 | 61 | 2000 Soccer NSW Finals and promoted to the 2000-01 NSW Premier League |
| 2 | Bonnyrigg White Eagles (P) | 26 | 18 | 1 | 7 | 79 | 45 | +34 | 55 | 2000 Soccer NSW Finals and promoted to the 2000-01 NSW Premier League |
| 3 | A.P.I.A. Leichhardt Tigers (P) | 26 | 14 | 6 | 6 | 53 | 39 | +14 | 48 | 2000 Soccer NSW Finals and promoted to the 2000-01 NSW Premier League |
| 4 | St George Saints (P) | 26 | 13 | 6 | 7 | 48 | 32 | +16 | 45 | 2000 Soccer NSW Finals and promoted to the 2000-01 NSW Premier League |
| 5 | Parramatta Eagles (P) | 26 | 9 | 14 | 3 | 51 | 35 | +16 | 41 | 2000 Soccer NSW Finals and promoted to the 2000-01 NSW Premier League |
| 6 | Fairfield Bulls | 26 | 10 | 5 | 11 | 44 | 43 | +1 | 35 | |
| 7 | Bankstown City Lions | 26 | 9 | 8 | 9 | 39 | 38 | +1 | 35 | |
| 8 | Canterbury Marrickville Olympic (P) | 26 | 10 | 3 | 13 | 36 | 49 | −13 | 33 | Promoted to 2000-01 NSW Premier League |
| 9 | Central Coast Coasties (P) | 26 | 7 | 10 | 9 | 41 | 41 | 0 | 31 | Promoted to 2000-01 NSW Premier League |
| 10 | Eastern Suburbs | 26 | 9 | 4 | 13 | 48 | 54 | −6 | 31 | Team withdrew at end of season. |
| 11 | Penrith Panthers (P) | 26 | 8 | 5 | 13 | 36 | 59 | −23 | 29 | Promoted to 2000-01 NSW Premier League |
| 12 | Macarthur Rams | 26 | 6 | 8 | 12 | 34 | 48 | −14 | 26 | |
| 13 | Manly Warringah Dolphins | 26 | 3 | 8 | 15 | 31 | 57 | −26 | 17 | |
| 14 | Sutherland Sharks (P) | 26 | 4 | 4 | 18 | 27 | 74 | −47 | 16 | Promoted to 2000-01 NSW Premier League |

Source: socceraust.co.uk
Rules for classification: 1) points; 2) goal difference; 3) number of goals scored.
(C) Champions; (P) Promoted

==== Finals ====
Qualifying Finals
2 | Bonnyrigg White Eagles | 4
3 | APIA Leichhardt Tigers | 3
4 | St George Saints | 1
5 | Parramatta Eagles | 3

Semi-finals
1 | Blacktown City Demons | 2
2 | Bonnyrigg White Eagles | 0
3 | APIA Leichhardt | 2
4 | Parramatta Eagles | 1

Preliminary Finals
2 | Bonnyrigg White Eagles | 2
3 | APIA Leichhardt | 0

Grand Final
1 | Blacktown City Demons | 2
2 | Bonnyrigg White Eagles | 1

=== 2000 NSW Division One ===
NSW Division One
- Season: 2000
- Champions: Dulwich Hill
- Premiers: Dulwich Hill
- Promoted: Dulwich Hill, Hajduk Wanderers United, Fraser Park Dragons, AC United, Rockdale City Suns, Stanmore Hawks, Moorebank Sports Club Liverpool, Hurstville City Minotaurs

The 2000 NSW Division One season was played over 22 rounds.

==== League table ====
| Pos | Team | Pld | W | D | L | GF | GA | GD | Pts | Qualification or relegation |
|---|---|---|---|---|---|---|---|---|---|---|
| 1 | Dulwich Hill (C) | 22 | 14 | 6 | 2 | 45 | 22 | +23 | 48 | Qualification for the 2000 Soccer NSW Div. 1 Finals and promotion to the 2001 NSW Winter Super League |
| 2 | Hajduk Wanderers United (P) | 22 | 15 | 2 | 5 | 42 | 21 | +21 | 47 | Qualification for the 2000 Soccer NSW Div. 1 Finals and promotion to the 2001 NSW Winter Super League |
| 3 | Fraser Park Dragons (P) | 22 | 11 | 7 | 4 | 47 | 28 | +19 | 40 | Qualification for the 2000 Soccer NSW Div. 1 Finals and promotion to the 2001 NSW Winter Super League |
| 4 | AC United (P) | 22 | 12 | 4 | 6 | 39 | 21 | +18 | 40 | Qualification for the 2000 Soccer NSW Div. 1 Finals and promotion to the 2001 NSW Winter Super League |
| 5 | Rockdale City Suns (P) | 22 | 10 | 3 | 9 | 42 | 32 | +10 | 33 | Qualification for the 2000 Soccer NSW Div. 1 Finals and promotion to the 2001 NSW Winter Super League |
| 6 | Stanmore Hawks (P) | 22 | 7 | 8 | 7 | 27 | 27 | 0 | 29 | Promotion to the 2001 NSW Winter Super League |
| 7 | Moorebank Sports Club Liverpool (P) | 22 | 7 | 8 | 7 | 24 | 25 | −1 | 29 | Promotion to the 2001 NSW Winter Super League |
| 8 | Hurstville City Minotaurs (P) | 22 | 7 | 5 | 10 | 29 | 34 | −5 | 26 | Promotion to the 2001 NSW Winter Super League |
| 9 | Auburn United | 22 | 6 | 4 | 12 | 31 | 48 | −17 | 22 | |
| 10 | Bathurst '75 | 22 | 6 | 4 | 12 | 27 | 52 | −25 | 22 | |
| 11 | Illawarra Lions | 22 | 4 | 5 | 13 | 21 | 43 | −22 | 17 | |
| 12 | Ryde City SC | 22 | 3 | 4 | 15 | 21 | 42 | −21 | 13 | |

Source: socceraust.co.uk
Rules for classification: 1) points; 2) goal difference; 3) number of goals scored.
(C) Champions; (P) Promoted

==== Finals ====
Qualifying Finals
2 | Hajduk Wanderers United | 2
3 | Fraser Park Dragons | 1
4 | AC United | 1
5 | Rockdale City Suns | 2

Semi-finals
1 | Dulwich Hill | 0
2 | Hajduk Wanderers United | 2
3 | Fraser Park Dragons | 1
5 | Rockdale City Suns | 0

Preliminary Finals
1 | Dulwich Hill | 2
3 | Fraser Park Dragons | 1

Grand Final
1 | Dulwich Hill | 2
2 | Hajduk Wanderers United | 0

=== 2000 NSW Division Two ===
NSW Division Two
- Season: 2000
- Champions: Hurstville ZFC
- Premiers: Greystanes FC
- Promoted: Greystanes FC, Hurstville ZFC, Mt Druitt Town Rangers, Hills United, Mount Pritchard FC, Sydney University, White City SC, Belmore Hercules

The 2000 NSW Division Two season was played over 22 rounds.

==== League table ====
| Pos | Team | Pld | W | D | L | GF | GA | GD | Pts | Qualification or relegation |
|---|---|---|---|---|---|---|---|---|---|---|
| 1 | Greystanes FC (P) | 22 | 16 | 2 | 4 | 57 | 24 | +33 | 50 | Qualification for the 2000 Soccer NSW Div. 2 Finals and promoted to 2001 NSW Division One |
| 2 | Hurstville ZFC (C) | 22 | 13 | 5 | 4 | 50 | 20 | +30 | 44 | Qualification for the 2000 Soccer NSW Div. 2 Finals and promoted to 2001 NSW Division One |
| 3 | Mt Druitt Town Rangers (P) | 22 | 11 | 7 | 4 | 41 | 29 | +12 | 40 | Qualification for the 2000 Soccer NSW Div. 2 Finals and promoted to 2001 NSW Division One |
| 4 | Hills United (P) | 22 | 12 | 1 | 9 | 39 | 32 | +7 | 37 | Qualification for the 2000 Soccer NSW Div. 2 Finals and promoted to 2001 NSW Division One |
| 5 | Mount Pritchard FC (P) | 22 | 11 | 4 | 7 | 31 | 24 | +7 | 37 | Promoted to 2001 NSW Division One |
| 6 | Sydney University (P) | 22 | 11 | 2 | 9 | 53 | 30 | +23 | 35 | Promoted to 2001 NSW Division One |
| 7 | White City SC (P) | 22 | 9 | 4 | 9 | 52 | 39 | +13 | 31 | Promoted to 2001 NSW Division One |
| 8 | Belmore Hercules (P) | 22 | 9 | 2 | 11 | 39 | 42 | −3 | 29 | Promoted to 2001 NSW Division One |
| 9 | Hakoah FC | 22 | 8 | 3 | 11 | 44 | 42 | +2 | 27 | |
| 10 | University of NSW | 22 | 7 | 5 | 10 | 30 | 33 | −3 | 26 | |
| 11 | Central Coast Lakers | 22 | 6 | 1 | 15 | 34 | 57 | −23 | 19 | |
| 12 | Sydney District | 22 | 0 | 2 | 20 | 14 | 112 | −98 | 2 | |

Source: socceraust.co.uk
Rules for classification: 1) points; 2) goal difference; 3) number of goals scored.
(C) Champions; (P) Promoted

==== Finals ====
Semi-finals
1 | Greystanes FC | 0
2 | Hurstville ZFC | 1
3 | Mt Druitt Town Rangers | 1
4 | Hills United | 1

Preliminary final
1 | Greystanes FC | 1
4 | Hills United | 2

Grand final
2 | Hurstville ZFC | 3
4 | Hills United | 0

=== 2000 NSW Division Three ===
NSW Division Three
- Season: 2000

The 2000 NSW Division Three season was played over 22 rounds.

==== League table ====
| Pos | Team | Pld | W | D | L | GF | GA | GD | Pts | Qualification or relegation |
|---|---|---|---|---|---|---|---|---|---|---|
| 1 | Prairiewood United (C) | 22 | 18 | 3 | 1 | 70 | 20 | +50 | 57 | Withdrew at end of the season |
| 2 | Western Sydney Lions (P) | 22 | 12 | 7 | 3 | 47 | 22 | +25 | 43 | Qualification for the 2000 Soccer NSW Div. 3 Finals and promotion to the 2001 NSW Division Two season |
| 3 | Colo Colo FC | 22 | 12 | 3 | 7 | 58 | 38 | +20 | 39 | Qualification for the 2000 Soccer NSW Div. 3 Finals |
| 4 | Balmain FC (P) | 22 | 11 | 5 | 6 | 37 | 29 | +8 | 38 | Qualification for the 2000 Soccer NSW Div. 3 Finals and promotion to the 2001 NSW Division Two season |
| 5 | The Wanderers (P) | 22 | 10 | 5 | 7 | 64 | 43 | +21 | 35 | Promotion to the 2001 NSW Division Two season |
| 6 | Holy Cross Ryde | 22 | 10 | 4 | 8 | 49 | 44 | +5 | 34 | Withdrew at end of the season |
| 7 | Parramatta City (P) | 22 | 8 | 6 | 8 | 47 | 49 | −2 | 30 | Promotion to the 2001 NSW Division Two season |
| 8 | Nepean District (P) | 22 | 7 | 5 | 10 | 38 | 39 | −1 | 26 | Promotion to the 2001 NSW Division Two season |
| 9 | Camden Tigers (P) | 22 | 6 | 7 | 9 | 41 | 43 | −2 | 25 | Promotion to the 2001 NSW Division Two season |
| 10 | Prospect United | 22 | 6 | 3 | 13 | 43 | 76 | −33 | 21 | |
| 11 | Trasandinos SC | 22 | 3 | 4 | 15 | 28 | 69 | −41 | 13 | |
| 12 | Liverpool City | 22 | 2 | 2 | 18 | 29 | 79 | −50 | 8 | |

Source: socceraust.co.uk
Rules for classification: 1) points; 2) goal difference; 3) number of goals scored.
(C) Champions; (P) Promoted

==== Finals ====
Semi-finals
1 | Prairiewood United | 4
2 | Western Sydney Lions | 2
3 | Colo Colo FC | 4
4 | Balmain FC | 1

Preliminary final
2 | Western Sydney Lions | 1
3 | Colo Colo FC | 1

Grand final
1 | Prairiewood United | 4
2 | Western Sydney Lions | 0

=== 2000 NSW Division Four ===
NSW Division Four
- Season: 2000
- Champions: Kellyville Kolts
- Promoted: Kellyville Kolts, United Eagles, Sydney Crescent Star, Granville Greenisland, Hawkesbury City, Springwood United, Auburn Star

The 2000 NSW Division Four season was played over 22 rounds.

==== League table ====
| Pos | Team | Pld | W | D | L | GF | GA | GD | Pts | Qualification or relegation |
|---|---|---|---|---|---|---|---|---|---|---|
| 1 | Kellyville Kolts (C) | 22 | 16 | 2 | 4 | 57 | 24 | +33 | 50 | Promoted to 2001 NSW Division Three |
| 2 | United Eagles (P) | 22 | 13 | 5 | 4 | 50 | 20 | +30 | 44 | Promoted to 2001 NSW Division Three |
| 3 | Sydney Crescent Star (P) | 22 | 11 | 7 | 4 | 41 | 29 | +12 | 40 | Promoted to 2001 NSW Division Three |
| 4 | Granville Greenisland (P) | 22 | 12 | 1 | 9 | 39 | 32 | +7 | 37 | Promoted to 2001 NSW Division Three |
| 5 | Hawkesbury City (P) | 22 | 11 | 4 | 7 | 31 | 24 | +7 | 37 | Promoted to 2001 NSW Division Three |
| 6 | Eastern Creek Pioneers | 22 | 11 | 2 | 9 | 53 | 30 | +23 | 35 | |
| 7 | Springwood United (P) | 22 | 9 | 4 | 9 | 52 | 39 | +13 | 31 | Promoted to 2001 NSW Division Three |
| 8 | Auburn Star (P) | 22 | 9 | 2 | 11 | 39 | 42 | −3 | 29 | Promoted to 2001 NSW Division Three |
| 9 | Marrickville | 22 | 8 | 3 | 11 | 44 | 42 | +2 | 27 | |
| 10 | Sporting SCC | 22 | 7 | 5 | 10 | 30 | 33 | −3 | 26 | |
| 11 | CSI Schofields | 22 | 6 | 1 | 15 | 34 | 57 | −23 | 19 | |
| 12 | Maroubra United | 22 | 0 | 2 | 20 | 14 | 112 | −98 | 2 | |

Source: socceraust.co.uk
Rules for classification: 1) points; 2) goal difference; 3) number of goals scored.
(C) Champions; (P) Promoted
