= 2007 NSW Premier League season =

NSW Premier League 2007
- League: NSW Premier League
- Sport: Association football
- Duration: 24 February – 5 August 2007
- Teams: 10

2007
- Champions: Blacktown City Demons FC
- Premiers: Blacktown City Demons FC

TigerTurf Cup
- Champions: Wollongong Wolves FC

NSW Premier League seasons
- ← 2006 2008 →

The 2007 NSW Premier League season was the seventh season of the revamped NSW Premier League.

The 2007 regular season began on 24 February 2007, at 16:00 UTC+10, and concluded on 5 August 2007 with the Grand Final where Blacktown City Demons FC defeated Bankstown City Lions FC 3–1.

During the course of the season, all Premier League, Super League and Division teams were involved in the TigerTurf Cup, an equivalent to the English FA Cup with teams competing in a series of elimination games.

== Changes from previous season ==
The only format change for this competition was that the first week of the finals would be played over two legs instead of one. The regular season remained a home-away format.

== Clubs ==
Teams promoted from Super League:
(After the end of the 2006 season.)

- Penrith Nepean United

Teams relegated to Super League:
(After the end of the 2006 season.)

- Parramatta Eagles

Club	Ground	Capacity
APIA Tigers	Leichhardt Oval	20,000
Bankstown City Lions FC	Jensen Oval	8,000
Blacktown City Demons FC	Fairfax Community Stadium	7,500
Manly United FC	Cromer Park	5,000
Marconi Stallions FC	Marconi Stadium	11,500
Penrith Nepean United FC	CUA Stadium	21,000
Sutherland Sharks FC	Seymour Shaw Park	5,000
Sydney Olympic FC	Belmore Sports Ground	25,000
Sydney United FC	Sydney United Sports Centre	12,000
Wollongong FC	Hooka Creek Park	5,000

== Regular season ==
=== League table ===
Pos	Team	Pld	W	D	L	GF	GA	GD	Pts	Qualification
1	Blacktown City (C)	18	11	5	2	38	19	+19	38	Qualified for the Championship Finals Series
2	Bankstown City	18	8	7	3	29	20	+9	31	Qualified for the Championship Finals Series
3	Marconi Stallions	18	8	6	4	34	27	+7	30	Qualified for the Championship Finals Series
4	Manly United	18	8	4	6	26	21	+5	28	Qualified for the Championship Finals Series
5	APIA Leichhardt Tigers	18	8	4	6	26	23	+3	28	
6	Sydney United	18	6	6	6	25	24	+1	24	
7	Wollongong FC	18	6	4	8	27	32	−5	22	
8	Sutherland Sharks	18	6	3	9	17	25	−8	21	
9	Sydney Olympic	18	4	5	9	22	35	−13	17	
10	Penrith Nepean United	18	3	0	15	18	36	−18	9	

Source: Flashscore
Rules for classification: 1) points; 2) goal difference; 3) number of goals scored.
(C) Champions

=== Results ===
Home \ Away	API	BAN	BCD	MAN	MAR	PNU	SUT	SYO	SYU	WOL
APIA Leichhardt Tigers		1–2	1–2	0–1	2–0	1–0	2–1	2–1	2–1	2–2
Bankstown City	1–1		1–1	2–2	2–0	6–2	1–1	3–2	0–0	1–1
Blacktown City Demons	0–0	4–0		3–0	0–5	3–1	1–3	2–2	1–1	4–1
Manly United	1–2	1–3	0–2		1–1	1–0	2–0	3–0	1–2	2–2
Marconi Stallions	2–6	1–1	1–1	1–2		3–2	1–0	3–3	3–1	3–1
Penrith Nepean United	0–2	0–1	1–4	0–3	1–2		0–1	2–1	1–2	1–2
Sutherland Sharks	1–0	1–0	0–3	0–1	2–4	0–1		1–1	3–2	1–0
Sydney Olympic	4–0	0–2	0–3	0–0	0–2	1–6	1–0		1–1	1–3
Sydney United	1–1	0–3	0–1	2–1	0–0	2–0	2–2	2–3		4–1
Wollongong FC	3–1	2–0	2–3	1–4	2–2	1–0	3–0	0–1	0–2	

Updated to match(es) played on 1 July 2007. Source: socceraust.co.uk
Legend: Blue = home team win; Yellow = draw; Red = away team win.

== Finals series ==
After the home and away season, the finals series began with the top four teams competing for the champions trophy. The finals series used a modified Page playoff system, with the difference that each first-round game would be played over two legs. The winner of the finals series, Blacktown City Demons FC was crowned as the NSW Premier League champions and as the holder of the top position on the league ladder were also named premiers.

Standard cup rules – such as the away goals rule (two-leg ties only), extra time and penalty shootouts were used to decide drawn games.

Semifinals
Blacktown City	0	2
Bankstown City	3	0
Marconi Stallions	0	1
Manly United	2	1

Preliminary final
1	Blacktown City (a.e.t.)	4
4	Manly United	2

Final
2	Bankstown City	1
1	Blacktown City	3

== Statistics ==
=== Top goalscorers ===
Rank	Player	Team	Goals
1	Tolgay Ozbey	Blacktown City Demons	16
2	Daniel Aliffi	Wollongong FC	11
2	Tallan Martin	Bankstown City Lions	11
4	Robbie Cattanach	Manly United	10
5	Daniel Severino	Bankstown City Lions	9
5	Robbie Younis	APIA Leichhardt Tigers	9
7	Osagie Edararo	Wollongong FC	7
7	Labinot Haliti	Sydney United	7
7	Anthony Hartshorn	APIA Leichhardt Tigers	7
7	Ben Vidaic	Sydney United	7
Source: socceraust.co.uk

== See also ==
- NSW Premier League
- Football NSW
