= 1980 Blacktown City FC season =

1st season in existence of Blacktown City FC in the National Soccer League

Blacktown City
1980 season
- Manager: Willie Wallace; John Green
- Stadium: Gabbie Stadium
- National Soccer League: 11th
- NSL Cup: Second round
- Top goalscorer: League: Paul Wilkinson (9); All: Paul Wilkinson (9)
- Highest home attendance: 4,874 vs. Marconi Fairfield (8 June 1980); National Soccer League
- Lowest home attendance: 1,024 vs. Sutherland (25 April 1980); NSL Cup
- Average home league attendance: 3,031
- Biggest win: 5–1 vs. Marconi Fairfield (H) (8 June 1980); National Soccer League
- Biggest defeat: 0–9 vs. Marconi Fairfield (A) (16 March 1980); National Soccer League

The 1980 season was the first in the National Soccer League for Blacktown City Football Club. In addition to the domestic league, they also participated in the NSL Cup. Blacktown City finished 11th in their National Soccer League season, and were eliminated in the second round of the NSL Cup.

== Players ==
Note: Flags indicate national team as defined under FIFA eligibility rules; some limited exceptions apply. Players may hold more than one non-FIFA nationality.

No.	Pos.	Nation	Player
1	GK	AUS	Bruce James
2	DF	AUS	George Harris
3	DF	AUS	Warren Turnbull
4	DF	AUS	Barry Campbell
5	DF	AUS	Cliff Pointer
6	MF	CHI	Ricky Hormazabal
8	MF	CHI	Carlos Ortega
9	FW	ENG	Paul Wilkinson
10	FW	AUS	Jim Izatt
11	MF	NZL	Bill Amey
12	FW	AUS	Ian Hunter
13	DF	AUS	Steve Pollard
14	FW	AUS	Alan Fisher

No.	Pos.	Nation	Player
15		AUS	Neil Taylor
16	DF	AUS	Don Campbell
17	MF	AUS	Phil Dolton
18	DF	CHI	Eduardo Pena
19	MF	ENG	Bruce Stowell
—	FW	ENG	Bobby Charlton
—	DF	AUS	Peter Cuk
—	GK	AUS	Peter Freeman
—		AUS	Gavin Landon
—		AUS	Neil Manning
—	MF	AUS	Brian O'Donnell
—	DF	AUS	Tony Rasmussen
—	MF	AUS	Stuart Selvage

== Competitions ==
=== Overall record ===
Competition	First match	Last match	Starting round	Final position	Record							
Competition	First match	Last match	Starting round	Final position	Pld	W	D	L	GF	GA	GD	Win %
National Soccer League	9 March 1980	28 September 1980	Matchday 1	11th	26	9	3	14	34	55	−21	34.62
NSL Cup	25 April 1980	6 July 1980	First round	Second round	2	1	0	1	2	3	−1	50.00
Total					28	10	3	15	36	58	−22	35.71

Source: Competitions

=== National Soccer League ===
==== League table ====
Pos	Team	Pld	W	D	L	GF	GA	GD	Pts	Qualification or relegation
1	Sydney City (C)	26	16	5	5	51	26	+25	37	Qualification to Finals series (Note: The Finals series was not considered the championship for the 1980 National Soccer League.)
2	Heidelberg United	26	15	6	5	55	33	+22	36	Qualification to Finals series
3	South Melbourne	26	15	5	6	42	21	+21	35	Qualification to Finals series
4	Marconi Fairfield	26	14	6	6	53	32	+21	34	Qualification to Finals series
5	Adelaide City	26	13	4	9	40	27	+13	30	
6	Newcastle KB United	26	12	6	8	32	31	+1	30	
7	Brisbane Lions	26	7	11	8	28	32	−4	25	
8	APIA Leichhardt	26	8	7	11	27	35	−8	23	
9	Footscray JUST	26	7	9	10	32	41	−9	23	
10	Canberra City	26	7	7	12	34	33	+1	21	
11	Blacktown City	26	9	3	14	34	55	−21	21	
12	Brisbane City	26	4	10	12	29	36	−7	18	
13	West Adelaide	26	7	3	16	24	46	−22	17	
14	St George-Budapest (R)	26	5	4	17	32	65	−33	14	Relegated to the 1981 NSW State League

Updated to match(es) played on unknown. Source: rsssf.com
Rules for classification: 1) points; 2) goal difference; 3) number of goals scored.
(C) Champions; (R) Relegated

==== Results summary ====
Overall								Home						Away					
Pld	W	D	L	GF	GA	GD	Pts	W	D	L	GF	GA	GD	W	D	L	GF	GA	GD
26	9	3	14	37	37	0	30	7	2	4	25	16	+9	2	1	10	12	21	−9

Source: worldfootball.net

==== Results by round ====
Round	1	2	3	4	5	6	7	8	9	10	11	12	13	14	15	16	17	18	19	20	21	22	23	24	25	26
Ground	H	A	H	A	H	A	H	A	A	H	A	H	A	H	A	H	A	A	H	A	H	H	A	H	A	H
Result	W	L	D	L	L	L	L	L	D	W	W	W	L	W	L	L	L	L	W	L	W	D	W	W	L	L
Position	1	10	10	13	13	13	13	13	14	12	10	10	10	10	10	11	12	13	12	12	12	12	11	9	10	11
Points	2	2	3	3	3	3	3	3	4	6	8	10	10	12	12	12	12	12	14	14	16	17	19	21	21	21

Source: worldfootball.net
A = Away; H = Home; W = Win; D = Draw; L = Loss

==== Matches ====
Win Draw Loss

9 March 1980 1	Blacktown City	4–2	St George-Budapest	Sydney
15:00 AEDT	Charlton 6'; Fisher 41'; Wilkinson 42'; Harding 75'	Report	Beggs 29'; McIntosh 50'	Stadium: Gabbie Stadium; Attendance: 3,478; Referee: Henry Witschge

16 March 1980 2	Marconi Fairfield	9–0	Blacktown City	Sydney
	Krncevic 22', 23', 63', 76'; Jankovics 49', 59', 71'; Sharne 61'; Vieri 65'	Report		Stadium: Marconi Oval; Attendance: 5,527; Referee: Richard Lorenc

23 March 1980 3	Blacktown City	1–1	Newcastle KB United	Sydney
	Ortega 33'	Report	Jones 13'	Stadium: Gabbie Stadium; Attendance: 2,457; Referee: Doug Rennie

30 March 1980 4	Heidelberg United	5–1	Blacktown City	Melbourne
	Rooney 15'; Selemidis 23'; Paton 56'; Cole 83'; Campbell 85'	Report	Pollard 25'	Stadium: Olympic Park No. 2 Attendance: 4,085; Referee: Jack Johnston

6 April 1980 5	Blacktown City	0–3	South Melbourne	Sydney
15:00 AEST		Report	Rogers 12'; Buljevic 59'; Campbell 60'	Stadium: Gabbie Stadium; Attendance: 3,250; Referee: Henry Witschge

13 April 1980 6	West Adelaide	4–2	Blacktown City	Adelaide
	Stowell 17' (o.g.); Kosmina 46'; Bozanic 60'; Manecas 71'	Report	Hunter 32'; Izatt 61'	Stadium: Hindmarsh Stadium; Attendance: 3,100; Referee: Dennis Stanley

20 April 1980 7	Blacktown City	1–3	Sydney City	Sydney
	Hunter 40'	Report	Smith 10'; Boden 32'; Barnes 35'	Stadium: Gabbie Stadium; Attendance: 3,054; Referee: Tim Davies

27 April 1980 8	Brisbane Lions	1–0	Blacktown City	Brisbane
15:00 AEST	McGregor 71'	Report		Stadium: Lions Stadium; Attendance: 3,231; Referee: Des Miles

4 May 1980 9	APIA Leichhardt	0–0	Blacktown City	Sydney
		Report		Stadium: Lambert Park; Attendance: 2,605; Referee: Doug Rennie

11 May 1980 10	Blacktown City	3–1	Brisbane City	Sydney
	Wilkinson 4'; Hormazabal 36'; O'Donnell 56'	Report	Palinkas 74'	Stadium: Gabbie Stadium; Attendance: 2,972; Referee: Peter Rampley

18 May 1980 11	Canberra City	0–1	Blacktown City	Canberra
15:00 AEST		Report	Wilkinson 84'	Stadium: Bruce Stadium; Attendance: 5,250; Referee: Dave Nugent

25 May 1980 12	Blacktown City	3–0	Footscray JUST	Sydney
	Hunter 49', 66'; O'Reilly 82' (o.g.)	Report		Stadium: Gabbie Stadium; Attendance: 3,568; Referee: Henry Witschge

1 June 1980 13	Adelaide City	3–2	Blacktown City	Adelaide
	Barnes 23'; Dods 56'; J. Nyskohus 80' (pen.)	Report	Wilkinson 15'; Pollard 83'	Stadium: Olympic Sports Field; Attendance: 3,100; Referee: Bobby Kerr

8 June 1980 14	Blacktown City	5–1	Marconi Fairfield	Sydney
	Selvage 47', 90'; Izatt 51'; O'Donnell 75' (pen.), 89'	Report	Jankovics 11'	Stadium: Gabbie Stadium; Attendance: 4,874; Referee: Tim Davies

15 June 1980 15	St George-Budapest	4–1	Blacktown City	Sydney
15:00 AEDT	Campbell 14'; Griffith 16'; Duarte 75'; Stone 87'	Report	Pointer 28'	Stadium: St George Stadium; Attendance: 3,269; Referee: Tony Boskovic

22 June 1980 16	Blacktown City	1–2	Heidelberg United	Sydney
15:00 AEST	Wilkinson 61'	Report	Bozikas 1'; Cole 53' (pen.)	Stadium: Gabbie Stadium; Attendance: 3,598; Referee: Doug Rennie

12 July 1980 17	Newcastle KB United	1–0	Blacktown City	Newcastle
	McClelland 75'	Report		Stadium: Newcastle International Sports Centre; Attendance: 4,603; Referee: Col Amos

20 July 1980 18	South Melbourne	5–0	Blacktown City	Melbourne
	Buljevic 21', 33'; Campbell 42', 81'; Bannon 66'	Report		Stadium: Middle Park Soccer Stadium; Attendance: 3,000; Referee: Tony Beazleigh

27 July 1980 19	Blacktown City	1–0	West Adelaide	Sydney
15:00 AEST	Fisher 77'	Report		Stadium: Gabbie Stadium; Attendance: 2,376; Referee: Tony Boskovic

10 August 1980 20	Sydney City	3–0	Blacktown City	Sydney
	Stevenson 32', 49'; Barnes 83'	Report		Stadium: ES Marks Athletics Field; Attendance: 2,580; Referee: Jim Reeves

17 August 1980 21	Blacktown City	4–1	Brisbane Lions	Sydney
15:00 AEST	Hormazaball 8'; Wilkinson 23', 90'; O'Donnell 70' (pen.)	Report	Wright 88'	Stadium: Gabbie Stadium; Attendance: 1,768; Referee: Tim Davies

31 August 1980 22	Blacktown City	0–0	APIA Leichhardt	Sydney
		Report		Stadium: Gabbie Stadium; Attendance: 3,148; Referee: Dave Nugent

7 September 1980 23	Brisbane City	1–2	Blacktown City	Brisbane
	Ratcliffe 48'	Report	Wilkinson 14', 85'	Stadium: Perry Park; Attendance: 2,312; Referee: Bob Mee

14 September 1980 24	Blacktown City	1–0	Canberra City	Sydney
	Hunter 88'	Report		Stadium: Gabbie Stadium; Attendance: 2,618; Referee: Richard Lorenc

21 September 1980 25	Footscray JUST	3–0	Blacktown City	Melbourne
	Ilioski 25'; Belic 72'; Picioane 76'	Report		Stadium: Western Oval; Attendance: 1,500; Referee: Don Campbell

28 September 1980 26	Blacktown City	1–2	Adelaide City	Sydney
	Hunter 16'	Report	Barnes 74'; Northcote 80'	Stadium: Gabbie Stadium; Attendance: 2,248; Referee: Jim Reeves

=== NSL Cup ===
Win Draw Loss

25 April 1980 First round	Blacktown City	2–0	(New South Wales) Sutherland	Sydney
	Amey 67' (pen.); Pollard 89'	Report		Stadium: Gabbie Stadium; Attendance: 1,024; Referee: Richard Lorenc

6 July 1980 Second round	Blacktown City	0–3	St George-Budapest	Sydney
		Report	Katholos 41'; Beggs 46'; Duarte 85'	Stadium: Gabbie Stadium; Attendance: 3,000; Referee: Dave Nugent

== Statistics ==
=== Appearances and goals ===
Includes all competitions. Players with no appearances not included in the list.

No.	Pos.	Nat.	Player	National Soccer League		NSL Cup		Total	
No.	Pos.	Nat.	Player	Apps	Goals	Apps	Goals	Apps	Goals
1	GK	(Australia)	Bruce James	16+1	0	1	0	18	0
2	DF	(Australia)	George Harris	20+1	0	2	0	23	0
3	DF	(Australia)	Warren Turnbull	22+1	0	1	0	24	0
4	DF	(Australia)	Barry Campbell	0+2	0	0	0	2	0
5	DF	(Australia)	Cliff Pointer	22	1	2	0	24	1
6	MF	(Chile)	Ricky Hormazabal	20	2	1	0	21	2
8	MF	(Chile)	Carlos Ortega	10+1	1	2	0	13	1
9	FW	(England)	Paul Wilkinson	21	9	2	0	23	9
10	FW	(Australia)	Jim Izatt	18	2	1	0	19	2
11	MF	(New Zealand)	Bill Amey	6+2	0	1	1	9	1
12	FW	(Australia)	Ian Hunter	22	6	0	0	22	6
13	DF	(Australia)	Steve Pollard	9+9	2	1	1	19	3
14	FW	(Australia)	Alan Fisher	10+4	2	1	0	15	2
15	—	(Australia)	Neil Taylor	2	0	0	0	2	0
16	DF	(Australia)	Don Campbell	7	0	0+2	0	9	0
17	MF	(Australia)	Phil Dolton	2+2	0	1	0	5	0
18	DF	(Chile)	Eduardo Pena	0+1	0	0	0	1	0
19	MF	(England)	Bruce Stowell	14	0	0	0	14	0
—	FW	(England)	Bobby Charlton	1	1	0	0	1	1
—	DF	(Australia)	Peter Cuk	9+1	0	2	0	12	0
—	GK	(Australia)	Peter Freeman	10	0	1	0	11	0
—	—	(Australia)	Gavin Landon	1	0	0	0	1	0
—	—	(Australia)	Neil Manning	0+2	0	0+1	0	3	0
—	MF	(Australia)	Brian O'Donnell	17	4	0	0	17	4
—	DF	(Australia)	Tony Rasmussen	3+4	0	2	0	9	0
—	MF	(Australia)	Stuart Selvage	17	2	1	0	18	2
Player(s) transferred out but featured this season
7	MF	(Australia)	Dave Harding	7	1	0	0	7	1

=== Disciplinary record ===
Includes all competitions. The list is sorted by squad number when total cards are equal. Players with no cards not included in the list.

Rank	No.	Pos.	Nat.	Player	National Soccer League			NSL Cup			Total		
Rank	No.	Pos.	Nat.	Player	Yellow card	Second yellow card	Red card	Yellow card	Second yellow card	Red card	Yellow card	Second yellow card	Red card
1	2	DF	(Australia)	George Harris	3	0	1	0	0	0	3	0	1
2	3	DF	(Australia)	Warren Turnbull	7	0	0	0	0	0	7	0	0
3	6	MF	(Chile)	Ricky Hormazabal	4	0	0	0	0	0	4	0	0
4	10	FW	(Australia)	Jim Izatt	3	0	0	0	0	0	3	0	0
5	9	FW	(England)	Paul Wilkinson	2	0	0	0	0	0	2	0	0
5	13	DF	(Australia)	Steve Pollard	2	0	0	0	0	0	2	0	0
7	5	DF	(Australia)	Cliff Pointer	1	0	0	0	0	0	1	0	0
7	7	MF	(Australia)	Dave Harding	1	0	0	0	0	0	1	0	0
7	8	MF	(Chile)	Carlos Ortega	1	0	0	0	0	0	1	0	0
7	—	DF	(Australia)	Peter Cuk	0	0	0	1	0	0	1	0	0
7	—	MF	(Australia)	Brian O'Donnell	1	0	0	0	0	0	1	0	0
Total					25	0	1	1	0	0	26	0	1

=== Clean sheets ===
Includes all competitions. The list is sorted by squad number when total clean sheets are equal. Numbers in parentheses represent games where both goalkeepers participated and both kept a clean sheet; the number in parentheses is awarded to the goalkeeper who was substituted on, whilst a full clean sheet is awarded to the goalkeeper who was on the field at the start of play. Goalkeepers with no clean sheets not included in the list.

Rank	No.	Nat.	Goalkeeper	NSL	NSL Cup	Total
1	1	(Australia)	Bruce James	3	1	4
2	—	(Australia)	Peter Freeman	3	0	4
Total				6	1	7
