= Michael Reda =

Association football player (born 1972)

Personal information
- Full name: Mohammad Taan Reda
- Date of birth: 30 December 1972 (age 53)
- Place of birth: Sydney, New South Wales, Australia
- Position: Midfielder

Senior career*
Years	Team	Apps	(Gls)
1989–1990	APIA Leichhardt	2	(0)
1991–1995	Parramatta Eagles	61	(6)
1993	→ Rockdale City Suns (loan)	12	(2)
1994	→ Adelaide City (loan)	12	(0)
1995–1996	Morwell Falcons	31	(2)
1996–1999	Wollongong Wolves	61	(2)
1999–2000	Melbourne Knights	24	(1)
2000	→ Fairfield Bulls (loan)		
2001–2002	Homenetmen		
2002–2003	Olympic Beirut		

International career
2000	Lebanon	8	(0)
- * Club domestic league appearances and goals

Mohammad Taan Reda (Arabic: محمد طعان رضا; born 30 December 1972), commonly known as Michael Reda, is a former professional association football player who played as a midfielder. Born in Australia, he represented Lebanon at the 2000 AFC Asian Cup.

== Club career ==
In 2000, Reda moved to Fairfield Bulls on loan.

== International career ==
Reda has played for Lebanon internationally, most notably making appearance for Lebanon at the 2000 AFC Asian Cup. He played for the School Sport Australia Football team in Singapore, Malaysia and Brunei in January 1991.

== Honours ==
Parramatta

- NSL Cup: 1993–94; runner-up: 1992–93
- NSL Challenge Cup: 1994

Adelaide City

- National Soccer League: 1993–94

Wollongong Wolves

- Waratah Cup: 1997

Melbourne Knights

- Tynan Eyre Cup runner-up: 1998, 1999

Olympic Beirut

- Lebanese Premier League: 2002–03
- Lebanese FA Cup: 2002–03

== See also ==
- List of Lebanon international footballers born outside Lebanon
