= Travis Major =

Australian soccer player (born 1990)

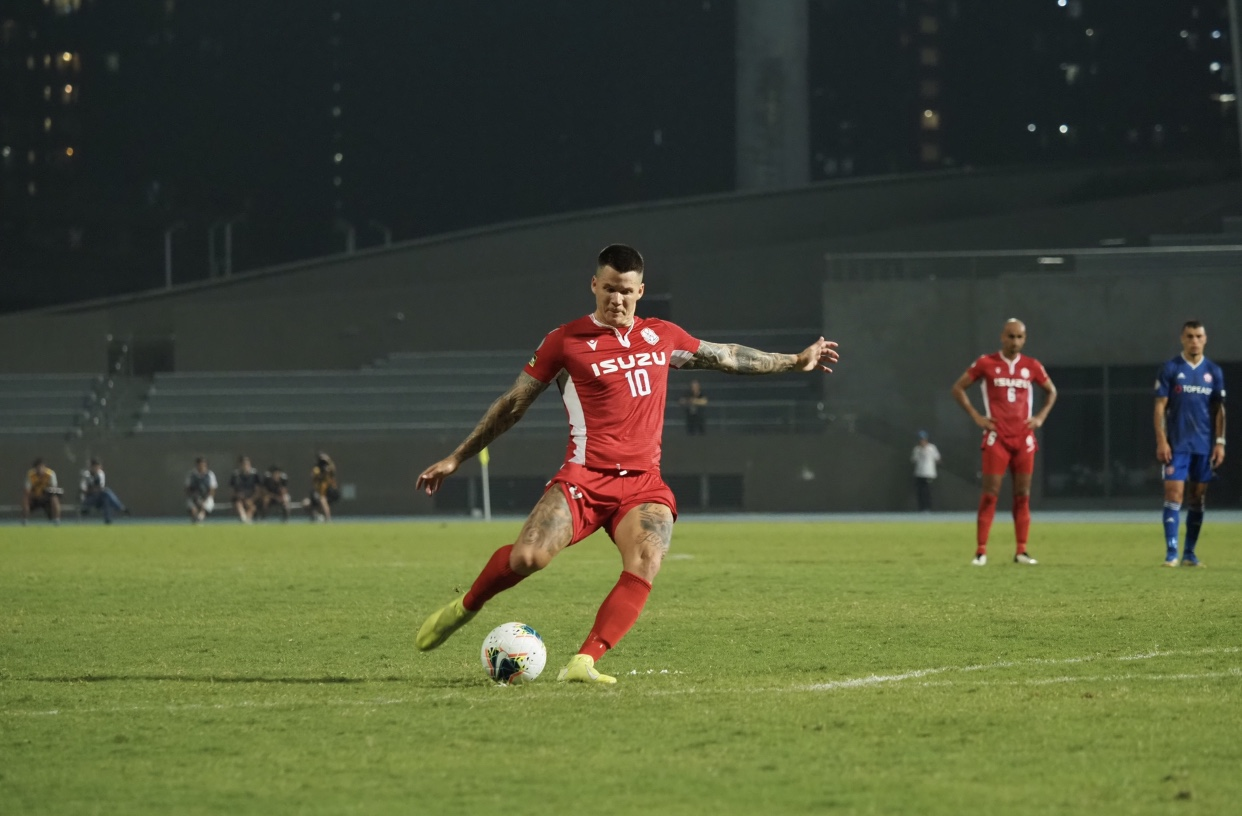

Personal information
- Full name: Travis Paul Major
- Date of birth: 18 February 1990 (age 36)
- Place of birth: Sydney, Australia
- Height: 1.87 m (6 ft 1 1/2 in)
- Positions: Striker; winger

Team information
- Current team: Blacktown City

Youth career
- 2005–2009: Blacktown City

Senior career*
Years	Team	Apps	(Gls)
2010–2014	Blacktown City	152	(62)
2015	Central Coast Mariners	9	(1)
2015–2016	Blacktown City	45	(18)
2016–2019	Pegasus	47	(28)
2019–2020	Southern	10	(8)
2021	Blacktown City	16	(12)
2021–2022	RoundGlass Punjab	17	(1)
2022–2026	Blacktown City	104	(46)
- * Club domestic league appearances and goals as of 23 January 2025

Travis Paul Major (born 18 February 1990) is an Australian professional soccer player who as a forward for National Premier Leagues NSW club Blacktown City.

== Career ==
On 3 January 2015, he signed for A-League side Central Coast Mariners. He scored his first and only goal in a 5–1 defeat to Sydney FC.

Major spent the 2016–17 season with Hong Kong club Pegasus. He was released by the club following the season. In August 2017, Major re-joined Pegasus during their pre-season training camp in Thailand. After almost three years at the club, Major left again on 22 April 2019 because of family reasons.

On 31 May 2019, Southern announced via Facebook that Major had signed for the 2019–20 season. On 19 April 2020, due to circumstances brought on by the 2020 coronavirus pandemic, Southern bought out the remainder of Major's contract.

On 12 February 2021, Major returned to Blacktown City whom he had last played for in 2016.

On September 3, 2021, it was announced that Major was signed by the I-League side RoundGlass Punjab for a season. Major would play the season deployed as a midfielder and go on to lead the league in assists (8).

On June 24, 2022, Major would return to Blacktown city in the mid season transfer window, his return led to Blacktown being crowned NSW NPL champions in a 2–0 victory over Manly United, where Major was announced man of the match and received the Robbie Slater medal. Major would also score his 100th goal for the club in the final, the first player in the clubs history to reach this milestone.

== Honours ==
Blacktown City

- National Premier Leagues: 2015
- National Premier Leagues NSW Championship: 2010, 2014, 2016, 2022
- National premier leagues NSW Championship runner-up: 2015
- National Premier Leagues NSW Premiership: 2015
- Waratah Cup: 2014
- Waratah Cup runner-up: 2015

Individual

- National Premier Leagues NSW Team of The Year: 2011, 2012, 2013, 2014, 2026
- Player of the year NPL NSW: 2014
- Robbie Slater Medalist: 2022
- Matt Lewis medalist player of the year: 2024, 2025, 2026
- Blacktown City Players Player: 2026
- Hong Kong Premier League Top Scorer: 2017/18
