= 2000–01 NSW Premier League season =

NSW Premier League
- Season: 2000–01
- Champions: Bonnyrigg White Eagles
- Premiers: Blacktown City FC
- Matches: 94
- Goals: 333 (3.54 per match)

The 2000–01 NSW Premier League season was the inaugural season of the NSW Premier League. The competition replaced the NSW Super League as the top-tier competition in New South Wales. The season moved away from a winter league to a summer league to align with the then premier national competition, the National Soccer League. The second-tier competition became the NSW Winter Super League.

The competition began on Friday, 3 November 2000 at St George Stadium for the Round 1 fixture between St George Saints and Canterbury-Marrickville. The competition concluded with the grand final being played on Sunday, 8 April 2001 at Marconi Stadium, with Bonnyrigg White Eagles FC taking out the title by defeating Premiers Blacktown City FC 3–1.

== Clubs ==
Club	Ground	Capacity
A.P.I.A. Leichhardt Tigers	Lambert Park	7,000
Belconnen Blue Devils	Belconnen Soccer Centre	2,000
Blacktown City Demons FC	Fairfax Community Stadium	7,500
Bonnyrigg White Eagles FC	Bonnyrigg Sports Club	10,000
Canterbury-Marrickville Olympic	The Crest Reserve	
Central Coast Coasties	Pluim Park	
Parramatta Eagles	Melita Stadium	10,000
Penrith Panthers	CUA Stadium	21,000
St George Saints	St George Stadium	15,000
Sutherland Sharks	Seymour Shaw Park	5,000

== Regular season ==
=== League table ===
Pos	Team	Pld	W	D	L	GF	GA	GD	Pts	Qualification
1	Blacktown City	18	12	3	3	47	28	+19	39	Qualified for the Championship Finals series
2	Bonnyrigg White Eagles (C)	18	10	5	3	45	22	+23	35	Qualified for the Championship Finals series
3	Parramatta Eagles	18	11	2	5	44	31	+13	35	Qualified for the Championship Finals series
4	Canterbury-Marrickville	18	8	4	6	34	28	+6	28	Qualified for the Championship Finals series
5	APIA Leichhardt Tigers	18	8	2	8	41	36	+5	26	
6	St George Saints	18	8	2	8	28	32	−4	26	
7	Belconnen Blue Devils	18	7	4	7	32	31	+1	25	
8	Central Coast Coasties	18	7	3	8	21	25	−4	24	
9	Penrith Panthers	18	2	4	12	16	43	−27	10	
10	Sutherland Sharks	18	0	5	13	12	44	−32	5	

Source: OzFootball
Rules for classification: 1) points; 2) goal difference; 3) number of goals scored.
(C) Champions

=== Results ===
Home \ Away	API	BEL	BCD	BWE	CMO	CCC	PAR	PEN	SGS	SUT
APIA Leichhardt Tigers		0–2	2–4	1–3	5–2	2–3	3–6	0–0	4–0	3–0
Belconnen Blue Devils	0–3		1–2	2–4	1–1	0–0	2–2	4–1	3–1	2–0
Blacktown City Demons	1–0	5–1		1–1	2–5	3–2	6–3	5–1	2–2	1–1
Bonnyrigg White Eagles	3–3	2–1	3–0		1–1	2–0	5–0	5–1	2–3	1–1
Canterbury-Marrickville Olympic	5–4	0–2	1–3	1–1		1–0	4–1	1–0	2–0	4–1
Central Coast Coasties	1–2	2–1	0–2	2–1	2–1		0–4	1–0	1–1	1–0
Parramatta Eagles	4–1	3–1	1–4	2–1	3–0	1–0		2–3	4–0	2–0
Penrith Panthers	1–3	1–4	0–1	2–3	0–0	2–2	0–4		0–4	3–3
St George Saints	0–1	2–3	4–2	1–3	2–1	2–1	0–1	1–0		2–1
Sutherland Sharks	1–4	2–2	0–3	0–4	0–4	0–3	1–1	0–1	1–3	

Updated to match(es) played on 31 May 2001. Source:
Legend: Blue = home team win; Yellow = draw; Red = away team win.

== Finals series ==
Semi-finals
1	Blacktown	2
2	Bonnyrigg	3
3	Parramatta	2
4	Canterbury-Marrickville	0

Preliminary finals
1	Blacktown	2
3	Parramatta	0

Grand final
2	Bonnyrigg	3
3	Blacktown	1

=== Semi-finals ===
24 March 2001 Minor semi-final	Parramatta Eagles	2–0	Canterbury-Marrickville Olympic	Lambert Park, Sydney
Saturday	D. Cummins 6'; J. Bakis 43'	Report

24 March 2001 Major semi-final	Blacktown City	2–3	Bonnyrigg White Eagles	Melita Stadium, Sydney
Saturday	Z. Donev 67'; S. Riches 71'	Report	M. Hawrysiuk 56'; J. Ghizzo 77'; F. Greco 88' (pen.)

=== Preliminary final ===
1 April 2001	Blacktown City	2–0	Parramatta Eagles	Serbian Centre, Sydney
Sunday	S. Riches 36'; J. Acchner 86'	Report

=== Grand final ===
8 April 2001	Bonnyrigg White Eagles	3–1	Blacktown City	Marconi Stadium, Sydney
	D. Harding 13'; J. Ghisso 80', 87'	Report	D. Iocca 89'	Referee: Greg Leverton

== See also ==
- NSW Premier League
- Football NSW
