= Bankstown City FC =

Bankstown City Lions
- Full name: Bankstown City Lions Football Club
- Nicknames: Lions, Sydney Makedonia
- Founded: 1975; 1988 (as Bankstown City Sydney Macedonia SC)
- Ground: Jensen Oval; Sefton, New South Wales
- Capacity: 8,000
- President: Robert Mileski
- Manager: Panagiotis Nikas
- League: NSW League One
- 2026: 3rd of 16
Home colours	Away colours

Bankstown City Lions Football Club, commonly referred to as Bankstown City Lions or simply Bankstown City, is an Australian football club from Bankstown, a suburb of Sydney, New South Wales, Australia. They compete in the NSW League One Men's, playing their home games at Jensen Oval.

== History ==
In the 1940s and 1950s the original Bankstown club played at Bankstown Oval and then in the 1960s and 1970s, they played out of a ground at Stacey Street and Gartmore Ave, Bankstown, then known as Bankstown Soccer Centre and now Ruse Park.

In 1975, Yagoona Macedonia was created by Macedonian immigrants in Yagoona. They competed in their first domestic season and their first recorded game by the Bankstown Soccer Federation against Padstow.

By 1988, the original Bankstown club had become insolvent and there was no elite team in the local area for several years. A local consortium purchased Maccabi Hakoah's licence to participate in the New South Wales Division 2. Bankstown once again had a team in the NSW State League. The new club had strong support from the local Bankstown and wider Macedonian community in Sydney, and named itself "Sydney Macedonia". Sydney Macedonia finished 3rd in 1988.

In 1989, the club was Champion of Division 2, losing only 3 games all season and received promotion to New South Wales Division 1. They finished 6th in their first year in Division 1.

In 1992, Sydney Macedonia played its first game in the top tier of NSW Football since the early 1970s. The following year, the club finished 2nd, however they went on to win the grand final, scoring a goal in the final minute against perennial rival Blacktown City, and were Premiers of 1993. This was the first ever time that Bankstown had its team as champions of the NSW State League.

1994 was the most successful season in the club's history. The team lost only 1 game in the season, winning 16 games in total. They scored 52 goals and conceded 9, and went on to win the grand final and finished as back-to-back Champions. In addition, Sydney Macedonia went on to play Sydney Olympic in the 1994 Waratah Cup Final at Marconi Stadium. Sydney Macedonia defeated Sydney Olympic, an NSL team, 2–1 at a sold out Marconi Stadium. The club had ensured the treble: Premiers, Back to Back Champions, Cup Winners. This still is the most successful accomplishment for football in Bankstown. After the 1994 season, the club reverted to its current name.

In 2001, Bankstown City won the NSW Winter Super League and were promoted to the NSW Premier League. The club's members financed an upgrade to their home ground at Jensen Oval, which saw the installation of TV Standard lighting and covered seating.

In 2004, Bankstown City finished in the top four earning participation in the finals series. They went on to win the NSWPL Grand Final against Belconnen in front of 7500 fans at Marconi Stadium, bringing back the Championship to Bankstown for the first time in 10 years.

In 2005 local junior, former Socceroo and current player Sasho Petrovski re-joined Bankstown when the NSL was disbanded. Bankstown City started the season strongly, and finished the season in first place on the ladder despite losing Petrovski, and Chad Gibson to the A-League midway through the season. Peter Tsekenis took on the role of Player/Coach, and Bankstown City were for the second time in a decade back-to-back Champions, defeating Bonnyrigg White Eagles 3–1 in the Grand Final in front of 8000 fans at Parramatta Stadium.

The 2007 season the first grade finished in second position on the ladder. In the finals, Bankstown City were defeated by Blacktown City in the grand final 3–1. While the youth finished in 3rd spot of the club championship, their highest achievement since coming into the competition.

Bankstown City defeated Sydney Olympic in the Final of the Waratah Cup for the second time in 2008 and prevailing 3–1 winners.

They were relegated to the NSW Super League (Tier 2) in 2011. In 2013 they competed in a revamped National Premier Leagues NSW 2 competition and suffered a further relegation to the NPL NSW 3 Men's competition in 2017.

In 2022, National Premier Leagues NSW 3 competition rename as NSW League Two and as end of season 2022, Bankstown City finish tops 8 and earning promotion back in NSW League One in 2023, due to a restructuring of Football NSW competitions.

== Supporters ==
Bankstown City FC generally draws support from Macedonian Australians, especially from the south-western suburbs of Sydney such as Bankstown and Yagoona

"The Lions Pride" is the name given to the actively vocal supporters group of the football club.

== Rivalries ==
=== Sydney Olympic FC ===
"Tensions always high between these two staunch rivals". This is due to the rivalry steming from the Macedonia naming dispute, but also from the fact that the two clubs are some of Sydney's largest and most successful and have often contested each other for silverware such as the 1994 Waratah Cup final where Bankstown came out on top.

=== Rockdale Ilinden FC ===
Bankstown City and Rockdale Ilinden are the two biggest Macedonian Clubs New South Wales but Bankstown were the dominant force in this matchup until the late 2010s with Bankstown suffering relegation and Rockdale rising to the top of Football NSW and becoming premiers. This rivalry is a friendly rivalry with fans often following both clubs and hoping they both succeed.

Various other important rivalries over the years included matches against Bonnyrigg White Eagles FC, Sydney United 58 FC, Canterbury Bankstown FC, and Bankstown United.

== Current squad ==
=== First team squad ===
As of 14 November 2026

Note: Flags indicate national team as defined under FIFA eligibility rules; some limited exceptions apply. Players may hold more than one non-FIFA nationality.

No.	Pos.	Nation	Player
1	GK	AUS	Mario Aleksic
2	DF	AUS	William Mutch
3	DF	JPN	Shun Maeta
4	DF	AUS	Tomislav Uskok
6	MF	AUS	Joshua Brillante
7	FW	AUS	Alec Urosevski
8	MF	AUS	Isaac Danzo
10	MF	AUS	Bai Antoniou
12	MF	AUS	Mario Shabow

No.	Pos.	Nation	Player
14	DF	AUS	Brayden Sorge
15	MF	AUS	Adrian Knez
16	DF	AUS	Aleksandar Gvozdenovic
19	FW	AUS	Jason Cakovski
20	MF	AUS	Blake Ricciuto
23	FW	AUS	Jesse Photi
26	FW	JPN	Fumoto Kamada
—	DF	AUS	Aleksandar Duricic
—	GK	AUS	Christopher Marques

=== U20s ===
Players to have been featured in a first-team matchday squad for Bankstown City in a competitive match

Note: Flags indicate national team as defined under FIFA eligibility rules; some limited exceptions apply. Players may hold more than one non-FIFA nationality.

No.	Pos.	Nation	Player
18	FW	AUS	Boris Skrbic
23	MF	AUS	Nicholas Forbes
24	MF	AUS	Daniel Kovacs
25	DF	AUS	Giuseppe Boccuzzo
26	DF	AUS	Nathan Gil
29	FW	AUS	Liam Mavridis
31	GK	AUS	Andrej Ristevski

No.	Pos.	Nation	Player
32	MF	AUS	Julian Jolevski
33	DF	AUS	Kai Bermingham
35	DF	AUS	Gianluca Melissari
38	MF	AUS	Dylan Piendibene
42	MF	AUS	Matthew Golovodovski
43	FW	AUS	Weideu Gabber
46	DF	AUS	Luka Mandalinic

=== Notable players ===
On 20 June 2025, Bankstown City announced a "Team of the Half-Century" to celebrate their 50th anniversary.

Note: Flags indicate national team as defined under FIFA eligibility rules; some limited exceptions apply. Players may hold more than one non-FIFA nationality.

No.	Pos.	Nation	Player
1	GK	AUS	Zlatko Josevski
2	DF	AUS	Mendo Ralevski
3	DF	AUS	Scott Baillie
4	DF	MKD	Bill Pilovski
5	DF	AUS	Richard Luksic
6	MF	AUS	George Nohra
7	FW	AUS	Sasho Petrovski
8	MF	MKD	Mile Todoroski
9	FW	AUS	Scott Gilbert
10	FW	AUS	Robert Mileski

No.	Pos.	Nation	Player
11	FW	AUS	Saso Boskovski
12	DF	AUS	Christian Ortiz
13	DF	AUS	Jeffrey Issa
14	DF	AUS	Peter Tsekenis
15	MF	AUS	George Fernandez
16	MF	AUS	George Souris
17	FW	AUS	Mary Fowler
18	DF	AUS	Stephanie Ambrose
19	MF	AUS	Zaya Jebraiel

== Management ==
=== Coaching staff ===
Position	Staff
Head coach	(Australia) Panagiotis Nikas
Assistant coach	(Australia) William Tsovolos
Coaches	(Australia) Huseyin Jasli
Coaches	(Australia) Yannick Mifsud
Goalkeeper coach	(Australia) Ante Covic

== Seasons ==
Season	League										Waratah Cup	Australia Cup	Other	Top scorer	
Season	Div	P	W	D	L	F	A	Pts	Pos	Finals	Waratah Cup	Australia Cup	Other	Player(s)	Goals (Note: Includes goals scored in the league's regular season and finals.)
1988	NSW State League Second Division	26	18	3	5	70	40	39	3rd	RU	Not Held				
1989	NSW State League Second Division	26	21	2	3	72	17	44	1st↑	–	Not Held				
1990	NSWSL	16	9	2	5	25	22	20	6th	–	RU				
1991	NSWSL (Note: Draws went to penalty shoot-outs during the 1991–1995 seasons (2 points for win, 1 point for loss).)	22	7	5+1	9	29	30	32	9th	–					
1992	NSWSL	22	11	0+4	7	39	30	37	6th	–				Scott Gilbert	16
1993	NSWSL	26	16	4+2	4	53	25	58	2nd	W	QF				
1994	NSWSL	22	16	2+3	1	52	9	55	1st	W	W			Scott Gilbert	16
1995	NSWSL	26	9	9+0	8	55	45	41	6th	–	6R			Nikolce Joseski	17
1996	NSWSL^{1}	13	6	2	5	28	20	20	5th	–	5R			Nikolce Joseski	21
1996	NSWSL^{2}	13	6	3	4	25	24	21	5th	–	5R			Nikolce Joseski	21
1997	NSWSL	20	7	6	7	32	30	27	5th	EF	RU			Bobby Zafirov - Nick Bosevski	5
1998	NSWSL	22	11	4	7	48	34	37	7th	–	Not Held	Not Held		Mile Todoroski	6
1999	NSWSL	22	13	1	8	43	31	40	5th	PF	Not Held	Not Held		Mendo Lozevski	10
2000	NSWSL	26	9	8	9	39	38	35	7th		Not Held	Not Held			
2001	NSWSL	22	14	5	3	39	14	47	1st↑	RU	Not Held	Not Held			
2001–02	NSWPL	22	10	5	7	51	48	35	7th	–	Not Held	Not Held			
2002–03	NSWPL	22	6	5	11	28	45	23	10th		Not Held	Not Held		Aleksander Asanovic	7
2003–04	NSWPL	22	12	2	8	40	33	24	3rd	W	3R	Not Held		Matthew Borg	19
2004–05	NSWPL	22	13	6	3	38	28	45	1st	W	3R	Not Held			
2006	NSWPL	18	10	3	5	35	28	33	2nd	PF	3R	Not Held			
2007	NSWPL	18	8	7	3	29	20	31	2nd	RU	3R	Not Held		Tallan Martin	11
2008	NSWPL	22	7	6	9	27	27	27	7th	–	W	Not Held	W^{JWC}	Robert Mileski	5
2009	NSWPL	22	11	5	6	39	31	38	4th	QF	QF	Not Held		Hussein Salameh	11
2010	NSWPL	22	7	5	10	37	41	26	8th	–	4R	Not Held		Robert Mileski	11
2011	NSWPL	22	6	3	13	30	47	21	11th↓	–	4R	Not Held		F. Graham - A. Hadid - H.Salameh -	5
2012	NSW Super League	22	15	3	4	53	29	48	2nd	PF	QF	Not Held	W^{MASO}	Gosue Sama	21
2013	NPL NSW 2	22	7	5	10	30	40	26	10th	—	3R	Not Held		Sasho Petrovski	10
2014	NPL NSW 2	22	6	10	6	36	37	28	7th	–	4R			Bradley Boardman	5
2015	NPL NSW 2	22	10	6	6	56	20	36	5th	RU	6R			Chris Gomez	12
2016	NPL NSW 2	22	14	3	9	53	41	45	3rd	EF	5R			Chris Gomez	12
2017	NPL NSW 2	26	5	1	20	32	81	16	14th↓	–	4R			Huseyin Jasli	13
2018	NPL NSW 3	26	14	4	8	63	41	46	5th	EF	4R			Ante Tomic	22
2019	NPL NSW 3	26	17	3	6	82	47	54	3rd	SF	4R			Nikola Todoroski	32
2020	NPL NSW 3	11	8	0	3	30	24	24	2nd	RU	Not Held			Ante Tomic	8
2021	NPL NSW 3	16	9	5	2	39	28	32	season cancelled		5R			Nikola Todoroski	10
2022	NSW League Two	22	12	1	9	44	38	37	6th↑	–	5R			Nikola Todoroski	16
2023	NSW League One	30	9	8	13	40	42	35	10th	Not held	3R			Jonathan Grozdanovski	9
2024	NSW League One	30	18	5	7	57	35	59	3rd	Not held	4R		W^{MASO}	Chris Payne	19
2025	NSW League One	30	11	4	15	38	45	37	10th	Not held	4R			Jonathan Grozdanovski	18
2026	NSW League One	30	17	5	8	65	45	56	3rd	Not held	5R			Bai Antoniou	18

== Honours ==
League

- NSW First Division Championship (level 2)
  - Champions (4): 1993, 1994, 2003/2004, 2004/2005
  - Runners-up: 2007
- NSW First Division Premiership (level 2)
  - Champions (2): 1994, 2004/2005
  - Runners-up: 1993, 2006, 2007
- NSW Second Division Championship (level 3)
  - Runners-up: 2001, 2015
- NSW Second Division Premiership (level 3)
  - Champions (2): 1989, 2001
  - Runners-up: 2012
- NSW Third Division Championship (level 4)
  - Runners-up: 2020
- NSW Third Division Premiership (level 4)
  - Runners-up: 2020
  - Promoted: 2022

Cups

- Waratah Cup
  - Winners (2): 1994, 2008
  - Runners-up: 1990, 1997
- Johnny Warren Cup
  - Winners (1): 2008
- Maso Cup
  - Winners (2): 2012, 2024
  - Runners-up: 2026

== Bankstown City Women ==
2013 was a milestone year for the club with the introduction of Women's teams. The senior team were competitive from the start and secured promotion from the third tier Women's State League to the National Premier League 2 in 2015.

In 2017, Bankstown City were crowned Champions of the NPL2 Women's, defeating Sydney Olympic in the Grand Final and earning promotion to the NPL1 Women's for the first time in 2018.

The 2018 NPL 1 Women's season saw Bankstown in a relegation battle against Sutherland for the duration of the season, with the Club winning their last match, and finishing 10th out of 12 teams.
