= Jensen Oval =

Suburban soccer park in Sefton, Sydney, Australia

Coordinates: 33°53′04″S 151°01′03″E

- Jensen Park
- Interactive map of Jensen Oval
- Location: 30 Clapham Road, Sefton, New South Wales
- Owner: City of Canterbury-Bankstown
- Operator: Bankstown City FC
- Capacity: 8,000 (Maximum Capacity)
- Surface: 1960 - Grass; 2019 - Artificial turf

Construction
- Opened: 1960
- Renovated: 2018
- Expanded: 2019

Tenants
- Bankstown City FC (FNSW League One) (1988–present); Canterbury Bankstown FC (FNSW League One) (2025–present); Bankstown United (FNSW League Two) (2016–2022)

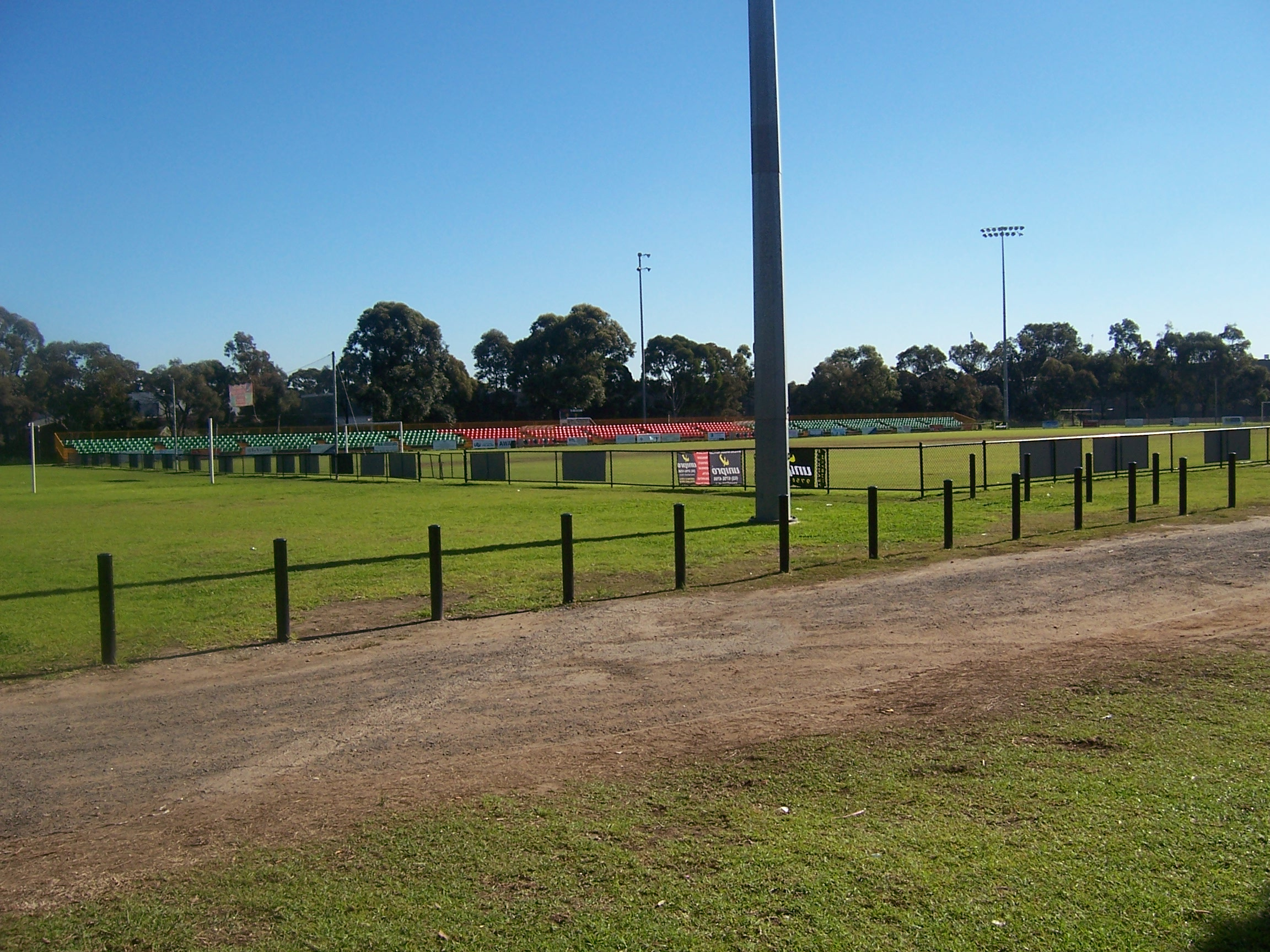
Soccer field

Jensen Oval is a suburban soccer park located on 30 Clapham Road, Sefton, Sydney, Australia, within the City of Canterbury-Bankstown. It is the homeground of the Bankstown City Lions who last played in the New South Wales Premier League/Pre-NPL NSW in 2011 and Bankstown United FC who last played at Jensen Park in 2022. also home matches for Canterbury Bankstown FC in 2025. It can currently hold up to 8,000 spectators. It has 2 main grandstands & a training park next to it.

It was built early in the 1960s as a Premier Ground for football in the Bankstown LGA. The Oval's facilities include play equipment, a soccer field, turf cricket pitch and toilets. Before the rebuild in the early 1960s it had been used by the local junior Regents Parks Soccer Club and also for cricket since at least the early 1950s.

In 2018 City of Canterbury-Bankstown Council has accepted $2.5 million upgrade to install an artificial turf surface at its Jensen Park soccer field. Construction is scheduled to begin in June and be completed by the end of February, 2019. The Council will work with Bankstown City Lions on future maintenance on the field.
