= Fairfield Bulls FC =

Fairfield Bulls
- Full name: Fairfield Bulls Football Club
- Nickname: Bulls
- Founded: 1971; 55 years ago
- Ground: Nineveh Soccer Stadium, Edensor Park, New South Wales
- Capacity: 1,000
- President: Ramsin Oraham
- League: Southern Districts
- Website: fairfieldbullssoccerclub.com.au
Home colours	Away colours

Fairfield Bulls Football Club is an Australian amateur (formerly semi-professional until 2012) football club based in Fairfield, New South Wales. The club is currently playing in the Southern Districts Football Association. Fairfield Bulls have previously been known as the Bonnyrigg Eagles and Nineveh Eagles Soccer Team.

The club is a regular participant in the Assyrian Cup held in both Sydney and Melbourne.

== History ==
Fairfield Bulls FC were formed in 1971 by a group of Assyrian migrants in Sydney wanting to establish both social and sporting clubs in Australia. The club was initially supported by the Assyrian Australian Association (AAA), and later with Nineveh Club. During November 1971, the AAA took the club under its control and applied for affiliation with the Southern Districts' Soccer Football Association (SDSFA).

Fairfield Bulls initially introduced two teams in their inaugural season, including "All Age Division 2 and 4" teams. During this season Fairfield Bulls Football Club was formed. By the end of their inaugural season, both teams made their respective semi-finals in their divisions with the division 3 side defeating Macedonian Eagles 2–1 to claim its first ever trophy.

In 2005, a standalone club was formed through the SDSFA and Football NSW football governing bodies with its own constitution to run the clubs affairs as a football club, affiliated with both Football NSW and Southern District Association. Fairfield Bulls has been a very successful club, winning many championships with the greatest achievement being promoted to Football NSW's NSW Premier League (highest division in NSW football) in 2001.

During their 2010 season, Fairfield Bulls managed to defeat Hurstville City Minotaurs FC 2–1 in the final to be crowned champions of State League 2 and gain promotion to State League 1.

Fairfield Bulls made their FFA Cup debut in a 3–0 loss to Wollongong United at Nineveh Stadium in 2019.

== First Grade Divisional History ==
- 1982–1983 New South Wales Division 2
- 1983–1988 New South Wales Inter Urban 1st Division
- 1989–1991 New South Wales Division 4
- 1992–1994 New South Wales 2nd Division
- 1995–1998 New South Wales 1st Division
- 1999–2000 NSW Super League (Tier 1)
- 2001 NSW Super League (Tier 2)
- 2001–2003 New South Wales Premier League
- 2004–2005 NSW Super League (Tier 2)
- 2008–2010 State League Two
- 2011 State League One

== Honours ==
- New South Wales 1st Division Champions – 1998
- NSW Super League Runners Up – 2001
- State League Two Champions – 2010

== Stadium ==
Fairfield Bulls play out of the Nineveh Soccer Stadium in Bonnyrigg, New South Wales behind the Nineveh Lounge and Reception. The stadium was built by the committee members of the club and has a 1,000 attendance capacity.

The junior club trains at St John's Park Oval close by to Nineveh Stadium.

== Rivalries ==
Marconi Stallions FC

Both Fairfield Bulls and Marconi Fairfield hail from Fairfield, creating a Fairfield Derby when both clubs meet in competitive football.

== Notable players ==
- Tony Popovic
- Michael Reda
- Nenos Bobo
- Matthew Borg
- Tony Basha
- Darren Iocca
- George Zabetakis
- Devrim Huseyin
- Maythem Abdal
- Nathan Barota

== Notable coaches ==
- Joe Watson
- Rale Rasic
- Marshall Soper

== See also ==
- Assyriska FF
- Western Sydney Wanderers FC
