= Blacktown City FC =

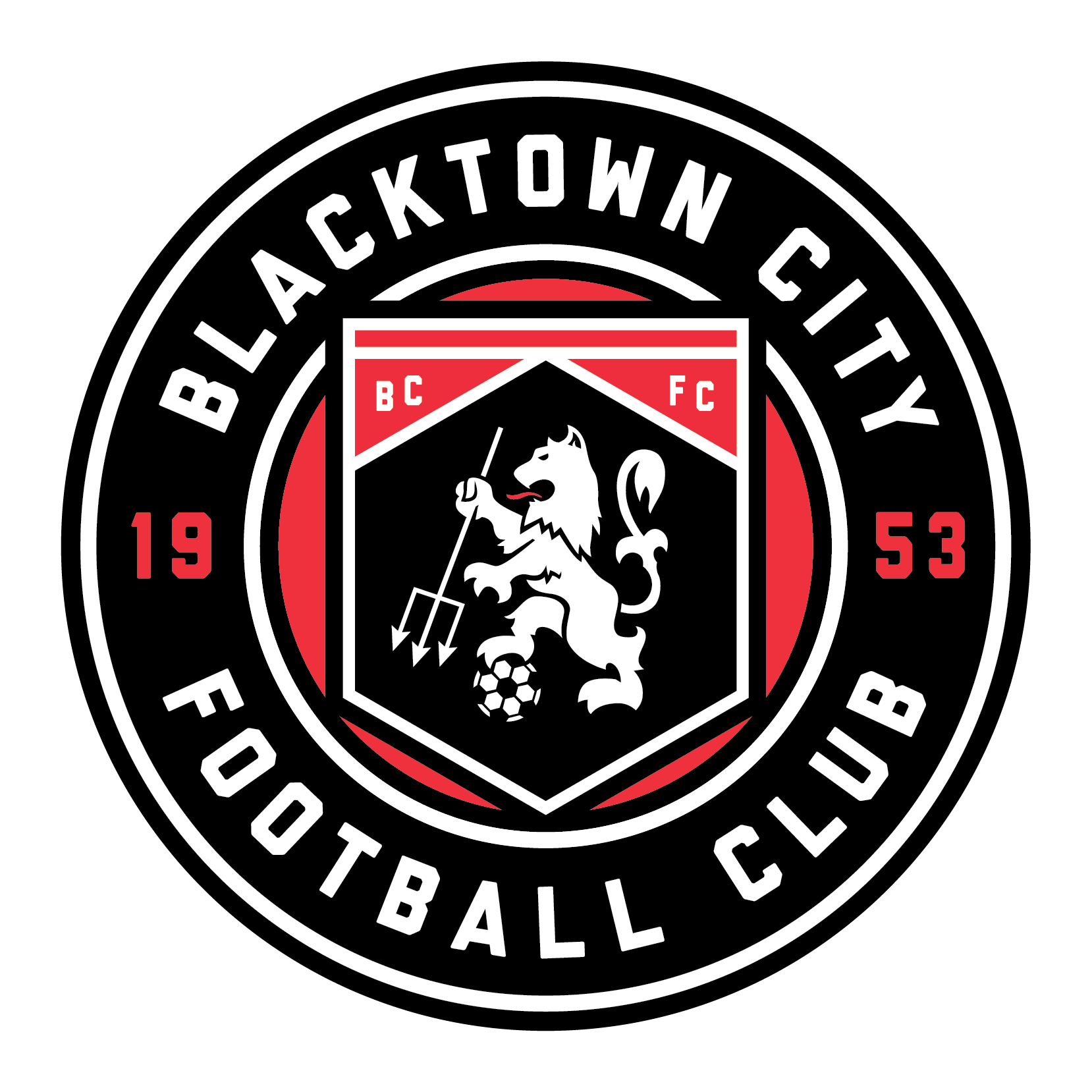
- Full name: Blacktown City Football Club
- Nickname: The Demons
- Founded: 1953; 73 years ago
- Ground: Landen Stadium
- Capacity: 7,500
- Manager: Mark Crittenden
- League: NPL NSW
- 2026: 13th of 16
- Website: blacktowncityfc.com.au
Home colours	Away colours

Blacktown City Football Club is an Australian semi-professional soccer club based in Blacktown, New South Wales. Founded in 1953, the club currently competes in the National Premier Leagues NSW. Blacktown City's home ground is Landen Stadium in the suburb of Seven Hills.

== History ==
The club was formed in 1953 as Toongabbie Soccer Club and changed their name to Blacktown City in 1979. The club competed in the National Soccer League in 1980, 1981, 1984, 1985, 1986, 1989 and 1990. Since then they have competed in the highest level in New South Wales, the NSW Premier League, where they have finished Premiers (1st in the League) in 2001, 2002/03, 2004/05, 2006 and 2008.

The Blacktown City Demons took out the double in 2007 winning both the Premiership and then staging a comeback from 1–1 with ten men to defeat Bankstown City 3–1 and claim the Championship. The team was known as Blacktown City Demons and owned by The Demons Sports Club until 2009 when the club went into liquidation. The demon image was retained in the logo but dropped from the name.

On 2 August 2017, Blacktown City defeated Central Coast Mariners 3–2 in the Round of 32 of the 2017 FFA Cup, becoming the fifth state-level side in FFA Cup history to defeat A-League opposition. Blacktown made it to the competition's quarter-finals, having defeated APIA Leichhardt Tigers in the Round of 16, where they would be eliminated on penalties by the Western Sydney Wanderers. This equals the Demons best finish in the FFA Cup, which they first achieved in 2016 when they lost to Sydney FC.

== Players ==
=== First team squad ===
As of 1 July, 2026

Note: Flags indicate national team as defined under FIFA eligibility rules; some limited exceptions apply. Players may hold more than one non-FIFA nationality.

No.	Pos.	Nation	Player
1	GK	AUS	Cayden Henderson
3	DF	AUS	Lachlan Tilt
4	DF	AUS	Nicholas O'Brien
6	DF	AUS	Adam Berry
7	FW	AUS	Travis Major
8	FW	AUS	Jak O'Brien
9	MF	AUS	Nikola Skataric
10	MF	AUS	Maksim Jez
11	FW	JPN	Kodai Tanaka
12	MF	AUS	Daniel McHugh
14	FW	MLT	Mitchell Mallia
15	DF	AUS	Caleb Jackson-Brown

No.	Pos.	Nation	Player
16	MF	AUS	Riley Nolan
17	MF	AUS	Julian Rodriguez
18	DF	AUS	Jake Briggs
19	DF	AUS	Sebastian Hayward
20	GK	AUS	Cooper Rogers
21	MF	AUS	Aiden Renshaw
22	MF	PHI	Jacob Maniti
27	DF	AUS	Nathan Grimaldi
—	DF	AUS	Lachlan Henderson
—	DF	AUS	James Nikolovski
—	DF	AUS	Sasha Kuzevski
—	FW	AUS	Alou Kuol

== Notable former players ==
Players included in this section have either represented their nation or have had their careers progress by playing or coaching in the A-League.

Australia

- (Australia) (England) Robbie Slater (44 national caps)
- (Australia) Adam Kwasnik (1 U/21 cap, various A-League teams)
- (Australia) Darren Stewart (3 national caps)
- (Australia) Jason van Blerk (33 national caps)
- (Australia) Gary van Egmond (15 national caps, coach Newcastle Jets)
- (Australia) Charlie Yankos (49 national caps)
- (Australia) Adam Biddle (Sydney FC 14 games)
- (Australia) Scott Jamieson (4 national caps)
- (Australia) (Croatia) Zlatko Arambašić (1992 Olympic games)
- (Australia) Chad Gibson (Brisbane Roar captain)
- (Australia) Tyler Simpson (Brisbane Roar, Perth Glory)
- (Australia) Joel Chianese (Sydney FC, Perth Glory)
- (Australia) Sean Rooney (Newcastle Jets)
- (Australia) Travis Major (Roundglass Punjab)
- (Australia) Mathew Ryan (current Socceroo)
- (Australia) Bernie Ibini (2 national caps)
- (Australia) Adam Berry (Central Coast Mariners)
- (Australia) Jacob Poscoliero (Central Coast Mariners, Perth Glory)
- (Australia) Kearyn Baccus (Melbourne City, Macarthur FC)
- (Australia) Mitchell Mallia (Sydney FC, Perth Glory)
- (Australia) Keanu Baccus (Western Sydney Wanderers)

Peru

- (Peru) Bruno Salas

Scotland

- (Scotland) Brian O'Donnell
- (Scotland) Lawrie McKinna (Central Coast Mariners manager)

England

- (England) Bobby Charlton (World Cup Winner, 106 national caps, Manchester United)^{1}
- Kevin Keegan (63 national caps, England manager, various EPL clubs as player and manager)

- Note 1: Charlton played one game for Blacktown in 1980, scoring a goal. It was his last professional match.

== Honours ==
=== Leagues ===
- National Premier Leagues
  - Champions (1): 2015
- NSW Division 1 / Super League / Premier League / NPL NSW Men's 1
  - Premiers (8): 1988, 1993, 2000, 2000–01, 2002–03, 2006, 2007, 2015
  - Champions (9): 1991, 1998, 1999, 2000, 2007, 2010, 2014, 2016, 2022
  - Runners-up (7): 1992, 1993, 1995, 2000–01, 2001–02, 2002–03, 2006

=== Cups ===
- Ampol Cup / Johnny Warren Cup
  - Champions (2): 1985, 2006
- Waratah Cup
  - Champions (5): 1991, 1993, 1996, 2006, 2014
  - Runners-up (1): 2015

== See also ==
- List of Blacktown City FC seasons
