= Penrith Nepean United FC =

Australian Football club, based in Sydney NSW

Penrith Nepean
- Full name: Penrith Nepean United Football Club
- Nickname: Penrith
- Founded: 1962
- Dissolved: 2009; 17 years ago
- Ground: Cook Park, Wilson Street, St Marys
- League: NSW Premier League; NSW Super League

Penrith Nepean United Football Club, originally the Penrith Panthers, was an Australian association football club based in St Marys, New South Wales.

== History ==
The club was originally known as Penrith Panthers. It rose to the New South Wales First Division in 1996 and again to the New South Wales Super League in 2000. The club became Penrith Nepean United from 2004.

From 2007, the club was promoted to the New South Wales Premier League, the highest level of competitive football (soccer) in New South Wales. United finished its last season in 2009 on ninth place amongst twelve participants, and ceased operations after this.

The club hosted its home games at Penrith Stadium, which from 2006 was named by sponsorship as Credit Union Australia (CUA) Stadium.

== Notable people ==
- Kyah Simon — a Matildas player, moved to the club from the Hills Brumbies early in her career.
