= National Premier Leagues NSW Men's =

- Founded: 2013; 13 years ago 2000–2012 (as NSW Premier League); 1992–2000 (as Super League); 1983–1991 (as Division One); 1978–1982 (as Super League); 1956–1977 (as Division One)
- Country: Australia
- State: (New South Wales) NSW
- Confederation: AFC
- Number of clubs: 16
- Level on pyramid: 3
- Relegation to: Football NSW League
- Domestic cup(s): National; Australia Cup; State; Waratah Cup
- Current champions: Sydney United 58 (2026)
- Current premiers: Apia Leichhardt (2026)
- Most premierships: Sydney United 58; Blacktown City (8 titles each)
- Broadcaster(s): YouTube
- Website: mens.nplnsw.com.au
- Current: 2026 NPL NSW

The National Premier Leagues NSW Men's is a men's semi-professional soccer league in New South Wales, Australia. The competition is conducted by Football NSW, one of the two organising bodies in New South Wales (the other being the National Premier Leagues Northern NSW organised by Northern NSW Football). The league is a subdivision of the second tier National Premier Leagues (NPL), which sits below the national A-League.

== History ==
=== Origins ===
Since 1956, a top divisional New South Wales based league has been contested annually in various forms, with its early days remembered as Division One. The league, jointly with other state-based leagues, formed the highest tier of soccer in Australia until the creation of a national league, the National Soccer League (NSL), in 1977. Before NSL, the Ampol Cup also ran concurrently as a state-based cup competition. In 1979 Division One officially changed its name to NSW State League, however, reverted to NSW Division One by 1983. The league continued to be contested throughout the winter months and included another name change in 1992 to the NSW Super League. During the 1980s and 1990s, Melita Eagles and Blacktown City FC were dominant in the league winning nine championships between them.

=== Foundations ===
At the end of the 2000 season, the top soccer divisions were revamped with the highest level of soccer being named the Premier League and being played over the summer to align with the then top tier of soccer in Australia (NSL). The second highest NSW league was named the Winter Super League and played throughout 2001. The 2004–05 season saw the return of the New South Wales NSL giants in Sydney Olympic, Sydney United 58, Wollongong Wolves and Marconi Stallions. This was the result of another overhaul of the entire national league structure. The NSL was abolished and the A-League took its place at the top of the soccer hierarchy in Australia. As this competition significantly reduced the teams from New South Wales to just three (Sydney FC, Central Coast Mariners and Newcastle Jets) these clubs were forced to return to the state leagues. The NSW Premier League continued to be run over summer throughout this period but after the 2004–05 season reverted to a winter competition from 2006.

In 2008 the whole New South Wales men's, women's and youth competitions were reconstructed to align youth teams with their respective senior clubs along with women's teams.

=== Development ===
In 2013 the FFA announced another re-structure, this time to the tier 2 level of soccer in Australia. This saw the top league in each state united under a single banner called the National Premier Leagues, with the NSW Premier League rebranded as the National Premier Leagues NSW. Bonnyrigg White Eagles became the inaugural champions of this competition after defeating Rockdale City Suns 1–0 in the final. Sydney United 58 FC were crowned premiers after placing first in the standing at the end of the regular season, earning the right to compete in the inaugural National Premier Leagues Finals. Sydney United went on to win this tournament defeating Tasmanian side South Hobart FC 2–0 in the final. In 2014, premiers Bonnyrigg White Eagles failed to reach the grand final and Blacktown City FC were crowned champions. They defeated Sydney Olympic 2–1 after extra time.

=== Name changes ===
Seasons	Title
1956–1977	Division 1
1978–1982	State League
1983–1991	NSW Division One
1992–2000	NSW Super League
2000–2012	NSW Premier League
2013–present	National Premier Leagues NSW
Source: OzFootball

== Competition format ==
=== League ===
In the regular season there are 30 Rounds in total with each team playing each other twice; home and away. The winner is declared as Premier. The Premier also qualifies for a separate, nationwide competition, the Australian Championship, which also includes five NSW NPL sides defined as "Foundation Clubs" (APIA Leichhardt, Marconi Stallions, Sydney Olympic, Sydney United 58,Wollongong Wolves).

=== Finals series ===
The top six teams from the regular season qualify for a three-week finals series, the winner of which is declared as Champion.

== Clubs ==
Locations of 2026 NPL NSW clubs
Locations of 2026 NPL NSW clubs within metropolitan Sydney

Club	Seasons	Location	Grounds	Capacity
APIA Leichhardt FC	13	Leichhardt	Lambert Park	7,000
Blacktown City FC	13	Blacktown	Lily Homes Stadium	7,500
Manly United FC	13	Dee Why	Cromer Park	5,000
Marconi Stallions FC	11	Bossley Park	Marconi Stadium	9,000
NWS Spirit FC	4	Macquarie Park	Christie Park	2,000
Rockdale Ilinden FC	13	Rockdale	Rockdale Ilinden Sports Centre	5,000
St George City FC	4	Penshurst	Penshurst Park	1,000
St George FC	4	Banksia	Barton Park Sports Complex	450
SD Raiders FC	1	Moorebank	Ernie Smith Reserve	
Sutherland Sharks FC	12	Miranda	Seymour Shaw Park	5,000
Sydney Sky Blues Youth FC	9	Rockdale	Rockdale Ilinden Sports Centre	5,000
Sydney Olympic FC	13	Belmore	Belmore Sports Ground	20,000
Sydney United 58 FC	13	Edensor Park	Sydney United Sports Centre	12,000
UNSW FC	1	Kensington	UNSW Village Green	
Western Sydney Wanderers Youth FC	4	Rooty Hill	Wanderers Football Park	3,000
Wollongong Wolves FC	13	Wollongong; Berkeley	WIN Stadium; Macedonia Park	23,750; 3,000
Source: Football NSW

== National Premier Leagues NSW Men's 1 Honours ==
Season	Regular season		Finals series			NPL finals series representation
Season	Premiers (number of titles)	Runners-up	Champions (number of titles)	Score	Finalists	NPL finals series representation
2013	Sydney United 58 FC (7)	Sutherland Sharks FC	Bonnyrigg White Eagles (3)	1–0	Rockdale City Suns	Sydney United 58 FC – **Champions**
2014	Bonnyrigg White Eagles (6)	Blacktown Spartans	Blacktown City (7)	2–1	Sydney Olympic	Bonnyrigg White Eagles – Runners-up
2015	Blacktown City (8)	APIA Leichhardt Tigers	Bonnyrigg White Eagles (4)	2–0	Blacktown City	Blacktown City – **Champions**
2016	Sydney United 58 FC (8)	Blacktown City	Blacktown City (8)	3–0	Sydney United 58 FC	Sydney United 58 FC – **Champions**
2017	APIA Leichhardt Tigers (5)	Blacktown City	Manly United (2)	0–0 (4–3 (p))	APIA Leichhardt Tigers	APIA Leichhardt Tigers – Semi-finalists
2018	Sydney Olympic (3)	APIA Leichhardt Tigers	Sydney Olympic (3)	3–1	APIA Leichhardt Tigers	Sydney Olympic – Semi-finalists
2019	Wollongong Wolves (2)	APIA Leichhardt Tigers	APIA Leichhardt Tigers (6)	2–1	Sydney United 58 FC	Wollongong Wolves – **Champions**
2020	Rockdale City Suns (1)	Wollongong Wolves	Sydney United 58 FC (5)	3–3 (4–2 (p))	Rockdale City Suns	Cancelled due to the COVID-19 pandemic in Australia.
2021	Cancelled due to the COVID-19 pandemic in Australia.					
2022	Sydney Olympic (3)	Manly United	Blacktown City (9)	2–0	Manly United	Not held
2023	APIA Leichhardt (6)	Rockdale Ilinden	Not held			Not held
2024	Rockdale Ilinden (2)	Marconi Stallions	Marconi Stallions (4)	3–0	Rockdale Ilinden	Not held
Season	Premiers	Runners-up	Champions	Score	Finalists	Australian Championship representation
2025	NWS Spirit (1)	APIA Leichhardt	APIA Leichhardt (7)	2–1	Rockdale Ilinden	NWS Spirit – Quarter-finals
2026	APIA Leichhardt (7)	Sydney United	Sydney United 58 (6)	3–1	APIA Leichhardt	Sutherland Sharks

Notes

- **Bold** indicates team won more than one of the three trophies in a season

== Honours pre-NPL (1957–2012) ==
Season	Competition	Regular season		Finals series		
Season	Competition	Premiers (number of titles)	Runners-up	Champions (number of titles)	Score	Finalists
1957	Division One	**Canterbury-Marrickville**	Auburn	Auburn	4–3	Canterbury-Marrickville
1958	Division One	Corrimal United	Canterbury-Marrickville	**Canterbury-Marrickville**	2–1	Auburn
1959	Division One	**Prague**	APIA Leichhardt	**Prague**	3–2	APIA Leichhardt
1960	Division One	Prague (2)	APIA Leichhardt	Canterbury-Marrickville (2)	5–2	Prague
1961	Division One	Prague (3)	Canterbury-Marrickville	**Hakoah**	4–1	Canterbury-Marrickville
1962	Division One	Budapest	Hakoah	Hakoah (2)	4–2	Budapest
1963	Division One	Prague (4)	APIA Leichhardt	South Coast United	4–0	APIA Leichhardt
1964	Division One	**APIA Leichhardt**	St George-Budapest	**APIA Leichhardt**	7–2	St George-Budapest
1965	Division One	South Coast United	St George-Budapest	**APIA Leichhardt** (2)	2–0	St George-Budapest
1966	Division One	APIA Leichhardt (2)	Hakoah Eastern Suburbs	Hakoah Eastern Suburbs (3)	2–1	APIA Leichhardt
1967	Division One	APIA Leichhardt (3)	St George-Budapest	St George-Budapest	5–2	APIA Leichhardt
1968	Division One	**Hakoah Eastern Suburbs**	Pan-Hellenic	**Hakoah Eastern Suburbs** (4)	4–2	Pan-Hellenic
1969	Division One	South Coast United (3)	St George-Budapest	APIA Leichhardt (3)	3–2	St George-Budapest
1970	Division One	Hakoah Eastern Suburbs (2)	St George-Budapest	Yugal Ryde	4–0	St George-Budapest
1971	Division One	**Hakoah Eastern Suburbs** (3)	St George-Budapest	St George-Budapest (2)	3–2	Western Suburbs
1972	Division One	**St George-Budapest** (2)	Marconi-Fairfield	Marconi-Fairfield	1–0	St George-Budapest
1973	Division One	Hakoah Eastern Suburbs (4)	Marconi-Fairfield	Marconi-Fairfield (2)	2–1	Hakoah Eastern Suburbs
1974	Division One	Hakoah Eastern Suburbs (5)	APIA Leichhardt	St George-Budapest (3)	4–2	Hakoah Eastern Suburbs
1975	Division One	**APIA Leichhardt** (4)	St George-Budapest	St George-Budapest (4)	1–0	APIA Leichhardt
1976	Division One	St George-Budapest (3)	APIA Leichhardt	APIA Leichhardt (4)	1–0	St George-Budapest
1977 (Note: Introduction of the National Soccer League)	Division One	**Croatia Sydney**	APIA Leichhardt	**Croatia Sydney**	2–0	Auburn
1978	Division One	Croatia Sydney (2)	Sutherland Shire	Sutherland Shire	1–1; 2–1 (replay)	Croatia Sydney
1979	State League	Croatia Sydney (3)	Inter Monaro	Inter Monaro	2–1	Sutherland Shire
1980	State League	Melita Eagles	Sydney Olympic	Sydney Olympic	4–0	Melita Eagles
1981	State League	Croatia Sydney (4)	St George-Budapest	St George-Budapest (5)	1–0	Croatia Sydney
1982	State League	**Croatia Sydney** (5)	Riverwood	**Croatia Sydney** (2)	2–1	Sutherland Shire
1983	NSW Division One	Melita Eagles (2)	Croatia Sydney	Croatia Sydney (3)	1–1 (a.e.t.); 0–0 (replay); 4–3 (p)	Melita Eagles
1984	NSW Division One	Inter Monaro	Rockdale Ilinden	Rockdale Ilinden	3–2	Inter Monaro
1985	NSW Division One	Canterbury-Marrickville Olympic (2)	Fairy Meadow	Melita Eagles	4–0	Fairy Meadow
1986	NSW Division One	Melita Eagles (3)	Manly Warringah	Sutherland Shire (2)	2–1	Melita Eagles
1987	NSW Division One	**Wollongong City**	Canberra City	**Wollongong City**	2–1	Canberra City
1988	NSW Division One	Blacktown City	Melita Eagles	Melita Eagles (2)	0–0; 7–6 (p)	Blacktown City
1989	NSW Division One	**Melita Eagles** (4)	Canberra Croatia	**Melita Eagles** (3)	2–0	Canberra Croatia
1990	NSW Division One	**Wollongong Macedonia**	Canberra Croatia	**Wollongong Macedonia**	2–0	Canberra Croatia
1991	NSW Division One	Sutherland Sharks	Blacktown City	**Blacktown City**	3–0	Canberra Metro
1992	NSW Super League	**Avala**	Manly Warringah Dolphins	**Avala**	2–0	Blacktown City
1993	NSW Super League	**Blacktown City** (2)	Bankstown City	Bankstown City	1–0	Blacktown City
1994	NSW Super League	**Bankstown City**	Canterbury-Marrickville	**Bankstown City** (2)	3–1	Canterbury-Marrickville
1995	NSW Super League	**Manly Warringah Dolphins**	Blacktown City	**Manly Warringah Dolphins**	1–0	Blacktown City
1996	NSW Super League - Stage 1 (Note: 1996 season divided into two stages.)	Adamstown Rosebud	Sutherland Sharks	Parramatta Eagles (4)	1–1; 5–3 (p)	Adamstown Rosebud
1996	NSW Super League - Stage 2	Parramatta Eagles	Sutherland Sharks	Parramatta Eagles (4)	1–1; 5–3 (p)	Adamstown Rosebud
1997	NSW Super League	**Parramatta Eagles** (5)	APIA Leichhardt	**Parramatta Eagles** (5)	3–1	Bonnyrigg White Eagles
1998	NSW Super League	Bonnyrigg White Eagles (2)	Blacktown City	Blacktown City (2)	1–0	Bonnyrigg White Eagles
1999	NSW Super League	Bonnyrigg White Eagles (3)	Blacktown City	Blacktown City (3)	5–1	Parramatta Eagles
2000	NSW Super League	**Blacktown City** (3)	Bonnyrigg White Eagles	**Blacktown City** (4)	2–1	Bonnyrigg White Eagles
2000–01	NSW Premier League	Blacktown City Demons (4)	Bonnyrigg White Eagles FC	Bonnyrigg White Eagles (2)	3–1	Blacktown City Demons
2001–02	NSW Premier League	**Parramatta Eagles** (6)	Bonnyrigg White Eagles FC	**Parramatta Eagles** (6)	1–0	Blacktown City Demons
2002–03	NSW Premier League	Blacktown City Demons (5)	APIA Tigers	APIA Leichhardt Tigers (5)	3–1	Blacktown City Demons
2003–04	NSW Premier League	Belconnen Blue Devils	St. George Saints	Bankstown City Lions (3)	2–0	Belconnen Blue Devils
2004–05	NSW Premier League	**Bankstown City Lions** (2)	Bonnyrigg White Eagles FC	**Bankstown City Lions** (4)	3–1	Bonnyrigg White Eagles FC
2006	NSW Premier League	**Blacktown City** (6)	Bankstown City Lions FC	Sydney United (4)	4–0	Blacktown City Demons FC
2007	NSW Premier League	**Blacktown City** (7)	Bankstown City Lions FC	**Blacktown City** (5)	3–1	Bankstown City Lions FC
2008	NSW Premier League	Sutherland Sharks (2)	Wollongong FC	Wollongong FC (2)	4–2	Sutherland Sharks FC
2009	NSW Premier League	Sydney United (6)	Marconi Stallions FC	**Sutherland Sharks** (3)	4–1	Marconi Stallions
2010	NSW Premier League	Bonnyrigg White Eagles (4)	Blacktown City Demons FC	Blacktown City FC (6)	1–0	Bonnyrigg White Eagles
2011	NSW Premier League	**Sydney Olympic**	Sydney United FC	**Sydney Olympic** (2)	2–0	Sydney United
2012	NSW Premier League	Bonnyrigg White Eagles (5)	Sydney Olympic FC	Marconi Stallions (3)	2–0	Bonnyrigg White Eagles

Source: SoccerAust

Notes

- **Bold** indicates Federation Double winners – i.e. League Championship and League Premiership OR League Championship and Federation/Waratah Cup OR League Premiership and Federation/Waratah Cup winners
- **Bold and Underlined** indicates Federation Treble winners – i.e. League Championship, League Premiership and Federation/Waratah Cup winners

=== All-time honour board ===
This list includes all champions and premiers since the inaugural league of 1957. Grand finals have occurred during all seasons of the league over this time. As the 1996 season was split into two stages there was no official premier for the season.

Club	Regular season premierships		Finals series championships	
Club	Premiers	Winning seasons	Champions	Winning grand finals
Blacktown City	8	1988, 1993, 2000, 2000–01, 2002–03, 2006, 2007, 2015,	9	1991, 1998, 1999, 2000, 2007, 2010, 2014, 2016, 2022
Sydney United 58 (Note: Includes titles as Croatia Sydney)	8	1977, 1978, 1979, 1981, 1982, 2009, 2013, 2016	6	1977, 1982, 1983, 2006, 2020, 2026
APIA Leichhardt	7	1964, 1965, 1967, 1975, 2017, 2023, 2026	7	1964, 1965, 1969, 1976, 2003, 2019, 2025
Parramatta FC (Note: Includes titles as Melita Eagles and Parramatta Eagles)	6	1980, 1983, 1986, 1989, 1997, 2001–02	6	1985, 1988, 1989, 1996, 1997, 2002
Bonnyrigg White Eagles	6	1992, 1998, 1999, 2010, 2012, 2014	4	1992, 2001, 2013, 2015
Hakoah Sydney City East (Note: Includes titles as Hakoah and Hakoah Eastern Suburbs)	5	1968, 1970, 1971, 1973, 1974	4	1961, 1962, 1966, 1968
Prague	4	1959, 1960, 1961, 1963	1	1959
St George FC (Note: Includes titles as Budapest and St George-Budapest)	3	1962, 1972, 1976	5	1967, 1971, 1974, 1975, 1981
Sydney Olympic	3	2011, 2018, 2022	3	1980, 2011, 2018
South Coast United (Note: Includes titles as Corrimal United)	3	1958, 1966, 1969	1	1963
Bankstown City Lions	2	1994, 2004–05	4	1993, 1994, 2004, 2005
Sutherland Sharks	2	1991, 2008	3	1978, 1986, 2009
Canterbury-Marrickville	2	1957, 1985	2	1958, 1960
Wollongong Wolves (Note: Includes titles as Wollongong City)	2	1987, 2019	2	1987, 2008
Rockdale Ilinden (Note: Includes titles as Rockdale City Suns)	2	2020, 2024	1	1984
Manly United	1	1995	2	1995, 2017
Inter Monaro	1	1984	1	1979
Wollongong United	1	1990	1	1990
NWS Spirit	1	2025		
Belconnen Blue Devils	1	2003–04		
Marconi Stallions			4	1972, 1973, 2012, 2024
Auburn			1	1957
Yugal-Ryde			1	1970

== Broadcasting ==
As of 2025, all matches are broadcast on the Football NSW YouTube channel, with highlights rolls for the games also being released at the end of each round. These broadcasts also now feature commentary, which is recorded live at the ground.

== See also ==
- List of National Premier Leagues NSW Men's honours
- National Premier Leagues NSW Women's
