= Gabbie Stadium =

Multi-purpose stadium in Sydney, Australia

Landen Stadium
- Interactive map of Landen Stadium
- Former names: Gabbie Stadium (1953–2007) Fairfax Community Stium (2007–2009) Lily Homes Stadium (2009–2014) Lily's Football Centre (2014–2020) Blacktown City Sports Centre (2020–2023)
- Address: 5 Quinn Ave; SEVEN HILLS; Australia
- Coordinates: 33°46′2″S 150°56′24″E
- Owner: Momento Hospitality
- Operator: Blacktown City FC
- Capacity: 7,500
- Surface: Artificial Turf

Tenants
- Blacktown City FC; Hills United FC

Website
- www.blacktowncityfc.com.au

Landen Stadium (previously Gabbie Stadium, Fairfax Community Stadium, Lily Homes Stadium, Lily's Football Centre, Blacktown City Sports Centre) is a multi-purpose stadium located in Sydney, Australia. It is the home ground of Blacktown City FC and Hills United FC. The stadium has a capacity crowd of 7,500 and is owned by Momento Hospitality.

== History ==
The stadium over the years has been used for soccer.

The venue has been originally known as Gabbie Stadium until naming rights deals with Fairfax Community Newspapers in 2007 settled on the name of Fairfax Community Stadium. In 2009, it was renamed Lily Homes Stadium. In 2014 it, was renamed Lily's Football Centre, in 2020 it was renamed Blacktown City Sports Centre, in 2023 it was renamed Landen Stadium.
