= 2024 Sydney United 58 FC season =

Sydney United 58
2024 season
- Head coach: Zeljko Kalac
- Stadium: Sydney United Sports Centre
- NPL NSW: 6th
- NPL NSW Finals: Semi-final
- Australia Cup: Seventh round
- Top goalscorer: League: Patrick Antelmi (10); All: Patrick Antelmi (18)
- Biggest win: APIA Leichhardt 1–5 Sydney United
- Biggest defeat: Sydney Olympic 6–0 Sydney United

The 2024 Sydney United 58 Football Club season is the club's 66th season in existence and 20th consecutive season in National Premier Leagues NSW. In addition to the domestic league, Sydney United participated in this season's edition of the Australia Cup, entering through the preliminary rounds. The season covers the period from 1 January 2024 until 31 December 2024.

Zeljko Kalac was appointed in his first stint with Sydney United, since 2020, replacing Miro Vlastelica in November 2023. The final squad was announced in February 2024. For away fixtures, Football NSW announced that Sydney United fans were not allowed entry into Bicentennial Park South where the club would face Rockdale Ilinden on 14 July.

Before the season, Glen Trifiro announced his retirement after eight years at Sydney United, claiming two state league titles, two state cup titles and a final appearance in the Australia Cup. Shunta Nakamura signed with the club in pre-season from Mt Druitt Town Rangers, having played in J2 League prior to his signing in Australia. The 2024 season is expected to be Sydney United's last season in the National Premier Leagues before the move to the National Second Division next year.

== Squad ==
=== First team ===
N	Pos.	Nat.	Name	Date of birth	Place of birth	Since	Previous club
1	GK	(Australia)	Oliver Kalac	9 November 2002	Foligno, Italy	2024	(Croatia) Jadran Luka Ploče
2	DF	(Australia)	Cristian Gonzalez	29 December 1996	Australia	2018	(Australia) Sydney FC
3	DF	(Australia)	Bailey Rule	30 August 2000	Australia	2023	Northern Tigers
4	DF	(Australia)	Adrian Vlastelica	16 January 1995	Sydney, Australia	2023	(Australia) Sydney FC
5	MF	(Australia)	Anthony Tomelic	8 March 1994	Sydney, Australia	2014	(Australia) Sydney FC
6	MF	(Australia)	Adam Zervas	28 September 2003	Australia	2024	(Australia) Newcastle Jets
7	DF	(Australia)	Jordan Ivancic	30 January 2002	Australia	2024	(Australia) Macarthur FC
8	MF	(Japan)	Shunta Nakamura	10 May 1999	Chiba, Japan	2024	Mt Druitt Town Rangers
9	FW	(Australia)	Patrick Antelmi	15 March 1994	Sydney, Australia	2020	(Australia) Western United
10	MF	(Australia)	Carlos De Oliveira	28 November 2000	Australia	2024	Blacktown City
11	MF	(Australia)	Matt Hatch	28 November 2000	Gosford, Australia	2024	Marconi Stallions
12	FW	(Australia)	Marco Arambasic	13 December 2002	Australia	2024	(Australia) Macarthur FC
13	FW	(Australia)	Alessandro Lacalandra	13 July 2004	Australia	2023	APIA Leichhardt
14	DF	(Australia)	Liam McGing	11 December 1998	Sydney, Australia	2024	Marconi Stallions
15	MF	(Australia)	Tariq Maia	11 June 1997	Australia	2018	(Australia) Western Sydney Wanderers
17	GK	(Australia)	Mathew Nikolovski	11 July 2000	Sydney, Australia	2024	Port Kembla
19	MF	(Australia)	Aidan Milicevic	8 September 2003	Australia	2024	(Australia) Central Coast Mariners
21	DF	(Australia)	Dejan Bakrdanikoski	15 January 2003	Australia	2024	Marconi Stallions

== Competitions ==
=== Overall record ===
Competition	First match	Last match	Starting round	Final position	Record							
Competition	First match	Last match	Starting round	Final position	Pld	W	D	L	GF	GA	GD	Win %
NPL NSW	17 February	25 August	Matchday 1	TBD	30	15	5	10	45	40	+5	50.00
Australia Cup	9 April	5 June	Fourth round	Seventh round	4	3	0	1	13	5	+8	75.00
Total					34	18	5	11	58	45	+13	52.94

Last updated: 18 August 2024
Source: Soccerway

=== National Premier Leagues NSW ===
==== League table ====
Pos	Team	Pld	W	D	L	GF	GA	GD	Pts	Qualification or relegation
4	Blacktown City	30	17	6	7	66	37	+29	57	Qualification for the Finals series
5	St George City	30	16	3	11	46	40	+6	51	Qualification for the Finals series
6	Sydney United	30	15	5	10	45	40	+5	50	Qualification for the Finals series
7	Wollongong Wolves	30	13	5	12	55	41	+14	44	
8	Sydney Olympic	30	13	3	14	51	42	+9	42	

Source: Football NSW
Rules for classification: 1) Points; 2) Goal difference; 3) Goals scored; 4) Head-to-head points; 5) Head-to-head goals scored; 6) Play-off match

==== Results summary ====
Overall								Home						Away					
Pld	W	D	L	GF	GA	GD	Pts	W	D	L	GF	GA	GD	W	D	L	GF	GA	GD
30	15	5	10	45	40	+5	50	8	2	5	19	13	+6	7	3	5	26	27	−1

Source: Football NSW

==== Results by round ====
Round	1	2	3	4	5	6	7	8	9	10	11	12	13	14	15	16	17	18	19	20	21	22	23	24	25	26	27	28	29	30
Ground	A	H	A	A	H	A	H	A	H	A	H	A	H	A	A	H	A	H	H	A	H	A	H	A	H	A	H	A	H	H
Result	W	L	L	D	W	W	W	D	L	W	W	W	W	D	L	W	L	L	W	W	D	W	L	L	W	L	D	W	L	W
Position	7	8		11	9	8	7	6	7	6	6	5	5	6	6	6	6		6	6	6	4	5	5	5	6	6	6	6	6

Updated to match(es) played on 18 August 2024. Source: Football NSW
A = Away; H = Home; W = Win; D = Draw; L = Loss

==== Matches ====
17 February 1	Central Coast Mariners	1–2	Sydney United 58	Lisarow
17:00 AEST (UTC+10)	Niyonkuru 41'; Busek (yellow card) 47'; Smyth (yellow card) 53'; Menham (red card) 81'; Smith (red card) 81'	Report	De Oliveira 32'; Antelmi 47' (pen.), (red card) 81'; Hatch (yellow card) 57'	Stadium: Pluim Park; Referee: Ivica Covic

25 February 2	Sydney United 58	1–2	Wollongong Wolves	Edensor Park
15:00 AEST (UTC+10)	De Robillard 77' (pen.); Rule (yellow card) 85'; Maia (yellow card) 90'	Report	Scott 17', 86', (yellow card) 37'; Ryan (yellow card) 33'; Masciovecchio (yellow card) 54'; Mustafa (yellow card) 74'; Riak (yellow card) 79'; McStay (yellow card) 85'	Stadium: Sydney United Sports Centre; Referee: Brodie Merchant

2 March 3	Sydney Olympic	6–0	Sydney United 58	Belmore
17:00 AEST (UTC+10)	Kuol 30', 53'; O'Donovan 37' (pen.); Majok 64'; Casella (yellow card) 70', (goal) 88'; Puflett 83'	Report		Stadium: Belmore Sports Ground; Referee: Stephen Lucas

5 March 4	NWS Spirit	1–1	Sydney United 58	Macquarie Park
20:00 AEST (UTC+10)	Bakmaz (yellow card) 54'; Mckinley (yellow card) 61'; Kavanagh 85'	Report	Nakamura 8'	Stadium: Christie Park; Referee: Adrian Arndt

10 March 5	Sydney United 58	3–0	Hills United	Edensor Park
17:00 AEST (UTC+10)	Hatch 24'; McGing (yellow card) 42'; Nakamura 44'; O.Kalac (yellow card) 76'; Milicevic 81'	Report	Makko (yellow card) 63'; Müller (yellow card) 93'	Stadium: Sydney United Sports Centre; Referee: Craig Fisher

16 March 6	St George FC	2–3	Sydney United 58	Rockdale
19:00 AEST (UTC+10)	Skataric 60'; Seeto (yellow card) 63'; O'Shea 75'; Souris (yellow card) 88'	Report	Antelmi 21'; Hatch 33', (yellow card) 71'; McGing (yellow card) 50'; De Oliveira 66', (yellow card) 88'; Lacalandra (yellow card) 67'	Stadium: Bicentennial Park South; Referee: Sebastien Brennan

24 March 7	Sydney United 58	1–0	Sutherland Sharks	Edensor Park
15:30 AEST (UTC+10)	Rule 15', (yellow card) 68'; Maia (yellow card) 48'; Tomelic (yellow card) 51'	Report	Green (yellow card) 42'; Gulisano (yellow card) 51'; Moric (yellow card) 53'; Stamatellis (yellow card) 68'	Stadium: Sydney United Sports Centre; Referee: Craig Fisher

31 March 8	Blacktown City	2–2	Sydney United 58	Seven Hills
15:00 AEST (UTC+10)	O'Brien (yellow card) 37', (goal) 44'; Mallia 90'	Report	De Oliveira 20', (yellow card) 51'; Nakamura 46'	Stadium: Landen Stadium; Referee: Jake Rose

7 April 9	Sydney United 58	1–2	Rockdale Ilinden	Edensor Park
15:00 AEST (UTC+10)	Nakamura 52'; Tomelic (yellow card) 60'	Report	Urosevski 29'; Griffiths (yellow card) 36'; Elliott 90+2'	Stadium: Sydney United Sports Centre; Referee: Craig Fisher

14 April 10	APIA Leichhardt	1–5	Sydney United 58	Sydney Olympic Park
14:30 AEST (UTC+10)	Caspers (yellow card) 36'; Stewart 64' (pen.)	Report	Milicevic 12'; Antelmi 15', 30', (yellow card) 75'; Hatch 45'; Nakamura 60'; O.Kalac (yellow card) 63'	Stadium: Sydney Olympic Park Athletic Centre; Referee: Danny Horstead

21 April 11	Sydney United 58	3–2	Marconi Stallions	Edensor Park
15:00 AEST (UTC+10)	Nakamura (yellow card) 20'; De Oliveira (yellow card) 30', (goal) 90+2'; McGing (yellow card) 37'; Vlastelica (yellow card) 43'; Milicevic 59', (yellow card) 89'; Antelmi 80'	Report	Temelkovski 27'; Windust 44', (yellow card) 86'; Maya (yellow card) 45'; Bouman (yellow card) 60'	Stadium: Sydney United Sports Centre; Referee: Adrian Arndt

26 April 12	Sydney FC	0–2	Sydney United 58	Rockdale
19:30 AEST (UTC+10)	Nkomo (yellow card) 39'; De Jesus (yellow card) 59' (red card) 74'	Report	Nakamura 7'; Milicevic 72'; Gonzalez (yellow card) 90+2'	Stadium: Bicentennial Park South; Referee: Kurt Ams

5 May 13	Sydney United 58	3–2	Western Sydney Wanderers	Edensor Park
15:00 AEST (UTC+10)	Rule (yellow card) 23'; Antelmi 27', 33'; De Robillard 64'; Vlastelica (red card) 72'; O.Kalac (yellow card) 79'; De Oliveira (yellow card) 81'; Z.Kalac (yellow card) 90+2'	Report	A.Hammond (yellow card) 23'; Culina (yellow card) 26'; Bugarija 68', 90+3'	Stadium: Sydney United Sports Centre; Referee: Stephen Lucas

10 May 14	Manly United	1–1	Sydney United 58	Cromer
19:30 AEST (UTC+10)	Bamgbose 33', (yellow card) 52'; Piriz (yellow card) 90+5'	Report	De Robillard 63'	Stadium: Cromer Park; Referee: Adrian Arndt

18 May 15	St George City	2–1	Sydney United 58	Penshurst
19:15 AEST (UTC+10)	Roberts 50'; Romero 54', (yellow card) 58'; Khoury (yellow card) 90'	Report	De Oliveira 38'; Bakrdanikoski (yellow card) 43'; Maia (yellow card) 57'; Vlastelica (yellow card) 71'	Stadium: Penshurst Park; Referee: Sam Kelly

26 May 16	Sydney United 58	1–0	Central Coast Mariners	Edensor Park
15:00 AEST (UTC+10)	Antelmi 60', (yellow card) 73'; Ivancic (yellow card) 90+4'	Report	Smith (yellow card) 55' (red card) 72'; Duarte (yellow card) 85'; Small (yellow card) 89'	Stadium: Sydney United Sports Centre; Referee: Brodie Merchant

2 June 17	Wollongong Wolves	3–2	Sydney United 58	Primbee
15:00 AEST (UTC+10)	McStay (yellow card) 41'; De Oliveira 47' (o.g.); Scott (yellow card) 58', (goal) 65'; Ofuka 78'	Report	De Oliveira 1'; Lacalandra 23'	Stadium: Albert Butler Memorial Park; Referee: Kurt Ams

9 June 18	Sydney United 58	0–1	Sydney Olympic	Edensor Park
15:00 AEST (UTC+10)	Tomelic (yellow card) 56'; Attard (yellow card) 90+6'	Report	O'Donovan 40'; Timotheou (yellow card) 45'; Majok (yellow card) 54'; James (yellow card) 86'; Simmons (yellow card) 90+4'	Stadium: Sydney United Sports Centre; Referee: Craig Fisher

12 June 19	Sydney United 58	3–0	NWS Spirit	Edensor Park
19:30 AEST (UTC+10)	De Oliveira 23'; Arambasic (yellow card) 37'; Lacalandra 58'; McGing (yellow card) 63'; Antelmi 65'; A.Crea (yellow card) 90+1'	Report	Wiggin (yellow card) 20'	Stadium: Sydney United Sports Centre; Referee: Logan Jones

15 June 20	Hills United	2–3	Sydney United 58	Seven Hills
19:00 AEST (UTC+10)	Okubo (yellow card) 13', (goal) 20'; Frangie 41'	Report	De Oliveira 52'; Maia (yellow card) 58'; Nakamura 68', (yellow card) 86'; Zervas (yellow card) 75'; Antelmi 90+1'	Stadium: Landen Stadium; Referee: Stephen Lucas

23 June 21	Sydney United 58	0–0	St George FC	Edensor Park
15:00 AEST (UTC+10)		Report	De Godoy (yellow card) 40'	Stadium: Sydney United Sports Centre; Referee: Adrian Arndt

29 June 22	Sutherland Sharks	0–1	Sydney United 58	Miranda
16:30 AEST (UTC+10)		Report	Nakamura 31'; De Oliveira (yellow card) 65'	Stadium: Seymour Shaw Park; Referee: Jake Rose

7 July 23	Sydney United 58	0–2	Blacktown City	Edensor Park
15:00 AEST (UTC+10)	Gonzalez (yellow card) 19'; Tomelic (yellow card) 48'	Report	Bandiera (yellow card) 10'; Major 26'; Shabow 61'; O'Brien (yellow card) 77'	Stadium: Sydney United Sports Centre; Referee: Kurt Ams

14 July 24	Rockdale Ilinden	4–0	Sydney United 58	Rockdale
15:00 AEST (UTC+10)	Cholakian 17'; Kataoka 27'; Urosevski 30', 32'	Report	McGing (red card) 12'; Antelmi (yellow card) 26'	Stadium: Bicentennial Park South; Referee: Sam Kelly

21 July 25	Sydney United 58	2–0	APIA Leichhardt	Edensor Park
15:00 AEST (UTC+10)	Tomelic (yellow card) 13'; De Oliveira (yellow card) 15'; Rule (yellow card) 44'; Lacalandra 62'; O.Kalac (yellow card) 77'; Nakamura 82'	Report	J.Symons (yellow card) 42'; Ucchino (yellow card) 61'	Stadium: Sydney United Sports Centre; Referee: Craig Fisher

27 July 26	Marconi Stallions	2–1	Sydney United 58	Bossley Park
19:00 AEST (UTC+10)	Jesic 10'; Temelkovski 11'; Mlinaric (yellow card) 33'	Report	Wells 57'; De Oliveira (yellow card) 86'	Stadium: Marconi Stadium; Referee: Michael Weiner

4 August 27	Sydney United 58	0–0	Sydney FC	Edensor Park
15:00 AEST (UTC+10)	De Oliveira (yellow card) 20'; Antelmi (yellow card) 48'	Report	Kucharski (yellow card) 27'; Kennedy (yellow card) 40' (yellow-red card) 87'; Glasson (yellow card) 42'; Gurd (yellow card) 72'; Mow (yellow card) 90+5'	Stadium: Sydney United Sports Centre; Referee: Rebecca Mackie

11 August 28	Western Sydney Wanderers	0–2	Sydney United 58	Rooty Hill
15:00 AEST (UTC+10)	Barbic (red card) 5'; Cameron (yellow card) 20'; O'Donoghue (yellow card) 68'	Report	Milicevic 15'; Tomelic (yellow card) 25'; De Robillard 31'	Stadium: Wanderers Football Park; Referee: Kelly Jones

18 August 29	Sydney United 58	0–2	Manly United	Edensor Park
15:00 AEST (UTC+10)	Zervas (yellow card) 14'	Report	Aganović 40'; Bauza 87' (pen.), (yellow card) 90+3'	Stadium: Sydney United Sports Centre; Referee: Craig Fisher

25 August 30	Sydney United 58	1–0	St George City	Edensor Park
15:00 AEST (UTC+10)	Vlastelica 90+1'	Report		Stadium: Sydney United Sports Centre; Referee: Adrian Arndt

==== Finals series ====
28 August Elimination-final	APIA Leichhardt	1–2	Sydney United 58	Edensor Park
19:00 AEST (UTC+10)	Ucchino (yellow card) 55'; Gibson 87'; Askew (yellow card) 90+5'	Report	Rule (yellow card) 43'; Bakrdanikoski (yellow card) 44'; De Oliveira 66'; Antelmi 79'; Lacalandra (yellow card) 90+7'	Stadium: Sydney United Sports Centre; Referee: Stephen Lucas

1 September Semi-final	Rockdale Ilinden	v	Sydney United 58	Rockdale
13:00 AEST (UTC+10)		Report		Stadium: Bicentennial Park South

=== Australia Cup ===
9 April Fourth round	Bulli FC	0–4	Sydney United 58	Kembla Grange
20:30 AEST (UTC+10)		Report	Antelmi 32', 51', 57'; Bakrdanikoski (yellow card) 42'; Lacalandra 89'	Stadium: Ian McLennan Park; Referee: Reece Edwards

24 April Fifth round	Eschol Park FC	1–4	Sydney United 58	St Helens Park
20:00 AEST (UTC+10)	W.Nahlous (yellow card) 28'; Y.Raffie (yellow card) 37', (goal) 70'; O.Sirec (yellow card) 90+5'	Report	De Oliveira 59'; Antelmi 82' (pen.), 86'; Lacalandra 90+7'	Stadium: Lynwood Park; Referee: Nicholas Farmer

22 May Sixth round	Wollongong United	2–4	Sydney United 58	Berkeley
19:30 AEST (UTC+10)	N.Darjani 16'; J.Stojanovski (yellow card) 44'; S.Matthews 47', (yellow card) 69'; J.Zufic (yellow card) 50'; D.Lazarevski (yellow card) 79' (red card) 80'; R.Jonovski (yellow card) 80'; T.Alston (yellow card) 84'; V.Elia (yellow card) 90+3'	Report	De Oliveira 14', (yellow card) 50'; Antelmi 15', 84' (pen.), (yellow card) 31'; Bakrdanikoski (yellow card) 21'; Hatch 70'	Stadium: Macedonia Park; Referee: Craig Fisher

5 June Seventh round	NWS Spirit	2–1	Sydney United 58	Macquarie Park
20:00 AEST (UTC+10)	Bakmaz (yellow card) 38', (goal) 48'; Lum 55'; J.Chidiac (yellow card) 87'; K.Williams (yellow card) 90+2' (red card) 90+4'	Report	Antelmi 9'; A.Zervas (yellow card) 84'; Vlastelica (yellow card) 90+4'	Stadium: Christie Park; Referee: Jake Rose

== Statistics ==
As of 18 August 2024 vs Manly United

No.	Pos.	Nat.	Player	NPL NSW		Australia Cup		Total	
No.	Pos.	Nat.	Player	Apps	Goals	Apps	Goals	Apps	Goals
Goalkeepers
1	GK	(Australia)	Oliver Kalac	29	0	2	0	31	0
17	GK	(Australia)	Mathew Nikolovski	0	0	2	0	2	0
58	GK	(Australia)	Ryan Warner	0	0	0	0	0	0
Defenders
2	DF	(Australia)	Cristian Gonzalez	6+9	0	2+2	0	19	0
3	DF	(Australia)	Bailey Rule	19	1	1	0	20	1
4	DF	(Australia)	Adrian Vlastelica (C)	27+1	0	4	0	32	0
7	DF	(Australia)	Jordan Ivancic	14+9	0	3	0	26	0
14	DF	(Australia)	Liam McGing	24	0	1+1	0	27	0
21	DF	(Australia)	Dejan Bakrdanikoski	7+11	0	4	0	22	0
29	DF	(Australia)	Joshua Attard	0+5	0	0	0	5	0
35	DF	(Australia)	Jy Kingham	0+2	0	0	0	2	0
40	DF	(Australia)	Malik Chamseddine	0+1	0	1	0	2	0
Midfielders
5	MF	(Australia)	Anthony Tomelic	25+3	0	4	0	32	0
6	MF	(Australia)	Adam Zervas	7+9	0	3+1	0	20	0
7	MF	(Australia)	Mason Wells	5+3	1	0	0	8	1
8	MF	(Australia)	Luiz Lobo	1+6	0	0	0	7	0
10	MF	(Australia)	Carlos De Oliveira	26	8	3+1	2	30	10
11	MF	(Australia)	Matt Hatch	19+5	3	1+1	1	26	4
15	MF	(Australia)	Tariq Maia	28	0	2	0	30	0
19	MF	(Australia)	Aidan Milicevic	16+5	5	0+3	0	24	5
22	MF	(Mauritius)	Stephan de Robillard	12+9	4	3	0	24	4
44	MF	(Australia)	Anthony Krilic	0+2	0	0	0	2	0
49	MF	(Australia)	Luke Zuvela	0+1	0	0	0	1	0
52	MF	(Australia)	Ali El-Sabeh	0+2	0	0	0	2	0
Forwards
9	FW	(Australia)	Patrick Antelmi	21+4	10	3+1	8	28	18
12	FW	(Australia)	Marco Arambasic	10+3	0	1+2	0	16	0
13	FW	(Australia)	Alessandro Lacalandra	8+20	3	1+3	2	32	5
Players who left during the season but made an appearance
8	MF	(Japan)	Shunta Nakamura	26	9	3+1	0	30	9
