= 2024 National Premier Leagues NSW Men's =

68th season of the NSW Premier League

NPL NSW Men's
- Season: 2024
- Dates: 16 February – 25 August
- Champions: Marconi Stallions
- Premiers: Rockdale Ilinden
- Relegated: Hills United
- Matches: 231
- Goals: 778 (3.37 per match)
- Top goalscorer: Alec Urosevski (Rockdale Ilinden) 31

The 2024 National Premier Leagues NSW was the 12th season of the National Premier Leagues in New South Wales and the second season under the revised competition format. The season began on 16 February 2024 and concluded on 25 August. APIA Leichhardt are the defending champions.

The 2024 season was a double round-robin format with each team playing 30 games for the regular season. The top-six teams qualified to the finals series. The competition's matches were broadcast free and live on YouTube with the addition of the 2024 Waratah Cup.

Rockdale Ilinden were Premiers, receiving the club's first major title in over four decades.

== Promotion and relegation ==
Promoted from 2023 NSW League One	Relegated from 2023 National Premier Leagues NSW
St George; Hills United	Mt Druitt Town Rangers; Bulls FC Academy

=== Stadiums and locations ===
Team	Head coach	Location	Stadium	Capacity
APIA Leichhardt	(Australia) Franco Parisi	Leichhardt	Lambert Park	7,000
APIA Leichhardt	(Australia) Franco Parisi	Leichhardt	Leichhardt Oval	20,000
Blacktown City	(Australia) Mark Crittenden	Blacktown	Blacktown City Sports Centre	7,500
Central Coast Mariners Academy	(Brazil) Lucas Vilela	Gosford	Pluim Park	2,000
Hills United	(Australia) Luke Casserly	Hills District	Blacktown City Sports Centre	7,500
Marconi Stallions	(Australia) Peter Tsekenis	Fairfield	Marconi Stadium	9,000
Manly United	(Netherlands) Patrick Zwaanswijk	Dee Why	Cromer Park	5,000
NWS Spirit	(Australia) David Perkovic	North Sydney	Christie Park	1,000
Rockdale Ilinden	(Australia) Paul Dee	Rockdale	Rockdale Ilinden Sports Centre	5,000
St George	(Australia) Steve Karavatakis	St George	Rockdale Ilinden Sports Centre	5,000
St George City	(Australia) Mirko Jurilj	St George	Penshurst Park	1,000
Sutherland Sharks	(Australia) Steven Zoric	Sutherland	Seymour Shaw Park	5,000
Sydney FC Youth	(Australia) Jimmy Van Weeren	Moore Park	Valentine Sports Park	4,000
Sydney Olympic	(Australia) Labinot Haliti	Belmore	Belmore Sports Ground	20,000
Sydney United	(Australia) Zeljko Kalac	Edensor Park	Sydney United Sports Centre	12,000
Western Sydney Wanderers Youth	(Australia) Andrew Christiansen	Blacktown	Wanderers Football Park	4,500
Wollongong Wolves	(Australia) David Carney	Wollongong	WIN Stadium	22,000

=== Managerial changes ===
Team	Outgoing manager	Manner of departure	Date of vacancy	Position in table	Incoming manager	Date of appointment
Sutherland Sharks	(Australia) Panny Nikas	Mutual consent	September 2023	Pre-season	(Australia) Steven Zoric	8 September 2023
Sydney United	(Australia) Miro Vlastelica	Mutual consent	November 2023	Pre-season	(Australia) Zeljko Kalac	15 November 2023
Central Coast Mariners	(Australia) Abbas Saad	N/A	2024	Pre-season	(Brazil) Lucas Vilela	2024
St George	(Australia) Jané Talcevski	Mutual consent	July 2024	11th	(Australia) Steve Karavatakis	2 July 2024

== Foreign players ==
Team	Visa 1	Visa 2	Non-visa foreigner(s)	Former players
APIA Leichhardt	(Japan) Seiya Kambayashi			
Blacktown City			(South Korea) Danny Choi^{1} (Malta) Mitchell Mallia^{2} (Philippines) Jacob Maniti^{2}	
Central Coast Mariners			(Malta) Lucas Scicluna^{2}	
Hills United	(Germany) Nicolai Müller	(Japan) Yu Okubo		
Manly United	(Spain) Miguel Bauzà			
Marconi	(Uruguay) Franco Maya			(Japan) Hiroaki Aoyama
NWS Spirit	(New Zealand) Gianni Bouzoukis			(Brazil) Luiz Lobo^{1:}
Rockdale Ilinden	(Japan) So Kataoka			(Syria) Moudi Najjar^{2}
St George FC				
St George City	(Japan) Fumoto Kamada	(United States) Jason Romero		
Sutherland Sharks	(Japan) Takahide Umebachi	(Japan) Kotaro Katsuta	(England) Chris Lindsay^{1}	
Sydney FC Youth				
Sydney Olympic	(Scotland) Ziggy Gordon		(Republic of Ireland) Roy O'Donovan^{1} (South Sudan) Abraham Majok^{1} (New Zealand) Zac Zoricich^{2}	
Sydney United			(Brazil) Luiz Lobo^{1} (Mauritius) Stephan De Robillard^{2}	(Japan) Shunta Nakamura
Western Sydney Wanderers	(New Zealand) Joseph Banza		(Philippines) Ryan Devine^{2}	
Wollongong Wolves	(Japan) Banri Kanaizumi	(Japan) Takumi Ofuka	(South Sudan) Yagoub Mustafa^{1} (Scotland) Chris McStay^{2}	

The following do not fill a Visa position:
^{1}Those players who were born and started their professional career abroad but have since gained Australian citizenship;
^{2}Australian citizens who have chosen to represent another national team;

== Regular season ==
=== Table ===
Pos	Team	Pld	W	D	L	GF	GA	GD	Pts	Qualification or relegation
1	Rockdale Ilinden	30	23	3	4	76	40	+36	72	Qualification for the Finals series
2	Marconi Stallions (C)	30	21	2	7	70	35	+35	65	Qualification for the Finals series
3	APIA Leichhardt	30	18	3	9	78	48	+30	57	Qualification for the Finals series
4	Blacktown City	30	17	6	7	66	37	+29	57	Qualification for the Finals series
5	St George City	30	16	3	11	46	40	+6	51	Qualification for the Finals series
6	Sydney United	30	15	5	10	45	40	+5	50	Qualification for the Finals series
7	Wollongong Wolves	30	13	5	12	55	41	+14	44	
8	Sydney Olympic	30	13	3	14	51	42	+9	42	
9	Manly United	30	10	5	15	33	50	−17	35	
10	NWS Spirit	30	10	4	16	39	53	−14	34	
11	Western Sydney Wanderers Youth	30	12	2	16	62	68	−6	32 (Note: Western Sydney Wanderers were deducted six points for breaches of the grievance and disciplinary regulations. In addition, they were fined $33,500 and given 'restricted access' for away supporters.)	
12	St George FC	30	8	8	14	37	58	−21	32	
13	Sutherland Sharks	30	7	8	15	32	49	−17	29	
14	Sydney FC Youth	30	8	5	17	39	67	−28	29	
15	Central Coast Mariners Academy (O)	30	8	4	18	42	67	−25	28	Qualification for the Relegation play-off
16	Hills United (R)	30	8	0	22	35	71	−36	24	Relegation to 2025 NSW League One

Source: Football NSW
Rules for classification: 1) Points; 2) Goal difference; 3) Goals scored; 4) Head-to-head points; 5) Head-to-head goals scored; 6) Play-off match
(C) Champions; (O) Play-off winners; (R) Relegated

=== Fixtures and results ===
Home \ Away	API	BCT	CCM	HIL	MAN	MAR	NWS	ROC	SGC	STG	SUT	SFC	SOL	SUN	WSW	WOL
APIA Leichhardt	—	3–1	3–1	4–1	4–0	1–4	1–0	3–2	4–1	5–0	3–2	1–5	2–0	1–5	5–3	1–1
Blacktown City	6–3	—	3–1	4–0	2–0	3–0	3–1	1–2	3–0	1–2	3–2	8–0	1–0	2–2	3–0	0–1
CCM Academy	3–2	1–1	—	5–3	2–2	0–1	3–0	1–2	0–3	3–3	3–2	1–1	0–2	1–2	2–5	3–2
Hills United	1–2	0–2	2–0	—	2–1	1–3	4–1	0–3	2–0	2–3	2–3	4–2	2–1	2–3	1–2	0–2
Manly United	1–0	1–1	2–0	0–2	—	0–1	3–2	1–1	1–2	3–0	1–1	1–0	0–2	1–1	0–5	2–1
Marconi Stallions	1–2	6–2	2–0	4–0	2–1	—	2–1	9–0	2–1	4–0	3–3	3–0	0–4	2–1	3–1	2–1
NWS Spirit	0–2	4–2	1–2	3–1	4–2	1–0	—	1–2	1–2	1–3	1–3	0–0	1–2	1–1	1–0	1–0
Rockdale Ilinden	2–1	2–3	4–1	5–0	4–0	2–2	3–1	—	2–0	4–0	4–0	3–1	3–2	1–1	3–2	3–1
St George City	1–0	0–2	2–0	3–1	3–1	2–1	3–4	1–2	—	1–1	1–1	1–2	1–0	2–1	5–0	0–2
St George FC	2–2	0–0	2–0	2–0	1–1	0–1	0–2	1–4	0–2	—	3–1	2–1	2–1	2–3	2–2	2–2
Sutherland Sharks	0–7	2–0	0–1	2–1	1–2	1–2	0–0	0–3	0–1	3–1	—	0–0	1–0	0–1	0–0	0–4
Sydney FC Youth	1–7	1–2	4–1	3–1	2–0	0–4	1–3	1–2	1–3	2–1	0–0	—	1–3	0–2	2–5	1–5
Sydney Olympic	1–1	3–3	1–2	1–2	2–1	1–2	2–1	2–1	0–1	0–3	1–1	1–2	—	6–0	4–1	4–3
Sydney United	2–0	0–2	1–0	3–0	0–2	3–2	3–0	1–2	1–0	0–0	1–0	0–0	0–1	—	3–2	1–2
WSW Youth	0–6	3–0	3–5	2–0	0–1	2–5	4–1	2–3	6–1	4–2	3–1	0–3	3–2	0–2	—	0–2
Wollongong Wolves	1–2	2–2	5–1	4–0	1–2	1–2	0–0	1–2	1–1	1–0	2–1	3–2	1–2	3–2	0–2	—

Updated to match(es) played on 25 August 2024. Source: footballnsw.com.au
Legend: Blue = home team win; Yellow = draw; Red = away team win.
For upcoming matches, an "a" indicates there is an article about the rivalry between the two participants.

== Finals series ==
Elimination semi-finals
3	APIA Leichhardt	1
6	Sydney United	2
4	Blacktown City	4
5	St George City	2

Preliminary finals
1	Rockdale Ilinden	3
6	Sydney United	1
2	Marconi Stallions	6
4	Blacktown City	2

Grand final
1	Rockdale Ilinden	0
2	Marconi Stallions	3

== Relegation play-off ==
The relegation play-offs took place on 31 August and 6 September 2024.

=== Overview ===
Team 1	Agg.	Team 2	1st leg	2nd leg
Central Coast Mariners Academy	5–2	Bulls FC Academy	1–2	4–0

=== Matches ===
31 August 2024
15:00

Bulls FC Academy	2–1	Central Coast Mariners Academy
Madden 10'; Debono 67'	Report	Hedley 47'

Sydney United Sports Centre, Edensor Park
Referee: Kelly Jones
6 September 2024
19:30

Central Coast Mariners Academy	4–0	Bulls FC Academy
Duarte 7' (pen.), 55' (pen.); Niyonkuru 17'; Brandtman 45'	Report

Pluim Park, Gosford
Referee: Kurt Ams

Central Coast Mariners Academy won 5–2 on aggregate, and therefore both clubs remained in their respective leagues.

== Regular season statistics ==
=== Top scorers ===
Rank	Player	Club	Goals
1	(Australia) Alec Urosevski	Rockdale Ilinden	31
2	(Australia) Marko Jesic	Marconi Stallions	20
2	(Republic of Ireland) Roy O'Donovan	Sydney Olympic	20
4	(Australia) Ben Gibson	APIA Leichhardt	19
4	(Australia) Jak O'Brien	Blacktown City	19
6	(Australia) James Temelkovski	Marconi Stallions	18
7	(Australia) Nathanael Blair	Western Sydney Wanderers	13
7	(Japan) Yu Okubo	Hills United	13
9	(Japan) Takumi Ofuka	Wollongong Wolves	12
9	(Australia) Jack Stewart	APIA Leichhardt	12

=== Hat-tricks ===
Player	For	Against	Result	Date	Ref.
Jak O'Brien^{4}	Blacktown City	APIA Leichhardt	6–3 (H)	17 February 2024	
Takumi Ofuka	Wollongong Wolves	Hills United	4–0 (H)	15 March 2024	
Alec Urosevski	Rockdale Ilinden	Wollongong Wolves	3-1 (H)	28 April 2024	
Ben Gibson	APIA Leichardt	Western Sydney Youth	6–0 (A)	28 April 2024	
Rory Jordan	APIA Leichardt	Sydney FC Youth	7-1 (A)	5 May 2024	
Taye Ashton Hedley	Central Coast Mariners Youth	St George FC	3–3 (H)	29 May 2024	
Dom Costanzo	Marconi Stallions	Rockdale Ilinden	9-0 (H)	19 June 2024	
Alec Urosevski	Rockdale Ilinden	Hills United	5-0 (H)	30 June 2024	
Jack Armson	APIA Leichardt	Sutherland	3-2 (H)	7 July 2024	
Yu Okubo	Hills United	NWS Spirit	4-1 (H)	20 July 2024	
Takeru Sugita	NWS Spirit	Blacktown City	4-2 (H)	10 August 2024	
Arthur De Lima	Central Coast Mariners Youth	Wollongong Wolves	3-2 (H)	11 August 2024	
James Temelkovski	Marconi Stallions	Blacktown City	6–2 (H)	1 September 2024	

Notes

- (H) – Home team
- (A) – Away team

== See also ==
- 2024 National Premier Leagues
