= Racism in sport in Australia =

Racism in sport in Australia has a long history, with instances dating back to the 19th century. Since the early 1990s, numerous cases of racial vilification have been reported, leading to sport organizations to address the issue through various measures.

== Background ==
Sport historian Colin Tatz, in his 1995 research into Aboriginal Australian and Torres Strait Islander athletes wrote: "they're Australians when they're winning, and Aborigines at other times", in summarising the history of racism in Australian sport. In his book Obstacle race: Aborigines in sport (1995), Tatz traces racism in Australia sport back to the 1800s. Since the 1990s there have been numerous racial vilification cases reported in the Australian media, partly due to the increase in Indigenous athletes participating in Australian Football League (AFL) and National Rugby League (NRL) and national sports organisations introducing rules to facilitate racial vilification cases.

In an incident in April 1995, Collingwood ruckman Damian Monkhorst racially abused Essendon's Michael Long. An Australian Football League (AFL) investigation after the incident showed that at least 10 players from six clubs regularly racially abused players. After this, the AFL introduced "Rule 30: A Rule to Combat Racial and Religious Vilification" on 30 June 1995 as a result of the shortcomings in Long's racial vilification case against Monkhorst. The Rule stated that: "no player... shall act towards or speak to any other person in a manner, or engage in any other conduct which threatens, disparages, vilifies or insults another person... on the basis of that person’s race, religion, colour, descent or national or ethnic origin". The AFL's rule was the first racial vilification code in Australia sport. The AFL lead the way with its code and subsequently most major national sports organisations introduced their own rules.

These voluntary sporting rules of conduct mirror Racial Discrimination Act 1975 and the Racial Hatred Act 1995 Section 18 C.(1) that: "It is unlawful for a person to do an act, otherwise than in private, if:
"(a) the act is reasonably likely, in all the circumstances, to offend, insult, humiliate or intimidate another person or a group of people; and
(b) the act is done because of the race, colour or national or ethnic origin of the other person or of some or all of the people in the group. to offend, insult, humiliate or intimidate another person or group of people because of their race, colour, or ethnic or national origin".

In 2006, the Australian Human Rights Commission (AHRC) published the report What's the score? A survey of cultural diversity and racism, which stated:

'Racism in sport is a complex problem. It can include: racism, discrimination, harassment or vilification by players directed at other players; by spectators directed at players; or racist behaviour among rival spectator groups which spill over into disruptions and violence in the stands. It also includes the actions of sporting officials and coaches, as well as media commentators.

The AFL has been seen to take leadership in the battle against racism in sport through showcasing an "Indigenous Round'" each year, with the highlight match being Dreamtime at the 'G. The NRL has an "Indigenous Round" and there is an annual game with the Indigenous All Stars.

The Play by the Rules website established in 2001 provides a wide range of resources in racism in sport to assist administrators, coaches, officials, players and parents.

In 2012, the AHRC launched a Racism. It Stops with Me, a community awareness campaign aimed to empower Australians to counter racial prejudice and discrimination. All the major sports organisations – Australian Football League, National Rugby League, Australian Rugby Union, Football Federation Australia, Cricket Australia, Netball Australia and Tennis Australia have become part of this campaign. A television advertisement was produced that included Indigenous and non-Indigenous athletes.

== Sports ==
Below are cases related to racial vilification in Australian sport. In several of the cases, there was no racial vilification proved. The list concentrates on cases at the elite level of sport relating to athletes, spectators and commentators but there is anecdotal evidence of racism in community sport. These cases consequently received wide media coverage. There appears an increase in cases related to fans either at sporting events or through social media.

=== Athletics ===
- 1888 – White sprinters refused to run against indigenous runners in the Sheffield Handicap held at Thargomindah, Queensland. The boycott resulted in an "Aborigines"-only race being held.
- 1903 – Queensland Amateur Athletic Association attempted to disbar all aborigines from athletics due to them “lacking moral character” and “lacking intelligence”. Australian Amateur Athletic Association rejected this discrimination attempt.
- 2012 – John Steffensen claimed that an Athletics Australia official called him a "nigger" and "jungle bunny' at the 2008 Beijing Olympics. Steffensen's complaint came after was not selected to run the individual 400 m at the 2012 London Olympics. Athletics Australia and the Australian Olympic Committee rejected the claim and stated that Steffensen should have made a complaint at Beijing Olympics.

=== Australian rules football ===
- 1927 – Doug Nicholls tried out to play for Carlton Football Club but was rejected because of his colour and his smell. Five years later Fitzroy Football Club enlisted his services.
- 1960–1990 – Several indigenous players including Carlton's Syd Jackson, North Melbourne's Phil and Jim Krakouer and Footscray's Michael McLean have stated that they were the target of racial slurs by opposition players and spectators. There is evidence that the Krakouer brothers were suspended for retaliating against racial abuse on the field. West Coast Eagles players Chris Lewis and Troy Ugle during their career received hate mail and death threats and were provided with counselling.
- 1993 – St Kilda indigenous player Nicky Winmar was racially vilified by the Collingwood supporters during an AFL game at Victoria Park, Melbourne. At the end of the game, Winmar lifted his shirt and pointed to his skin and declared "I'm black and I'm proud to be black". This became an iconic image of racism in Australian sport. Allan McAlister, Collingwood's President commented that Winmar and his team mate Gilbert McAdam would be respected "as long as they conducted themselves like white people on and off the field".
- 1995 – Essendon player Michael Long accused Collingwood's Damian Monkhorst of a racial taunt during the first Anzac Day match at Melbourne Cricket Ground. Long was not satisfied with the outcome of an AFL organised mediation session. However, this case led to the AFL introducing Rule 30: A Rule to Combat Racial and Religious Vilification on 30 June 1995.
- 1995 – Greg Williams, a Carlton player, unreservedly apologised to West Coast Eagles Chris Lewis for racially abusing him during a match at Subiaco Oval. Lewis accepted the apology.
- 1997 – Collingwood's Robbie Ahmat claimed he was racially vilified by Essendon's Michael Prior in the last quarter of that year's Anzac Day match. Prior claimed that he called Ahmat a "dumb cunt" rather than a "dark cunt". Prior was cleared at a tribunal hearing.
- 1997 – Western Bulldogs player Todd Curley allegedly racially vilified Melbourne's David Cockatoo-Collins by calling him a "black cunt". Curley claimed this was incorrect and that he had referred to him as a "weak cunt". Curley was cleared of any offence.
- 1999 – Peter Everitt, a St Kilda player racially abused Melbourne's Scott Chisholm after kicking a goal in the Round 2 match at Waverley Park. Everritt donated $20,000 to a charity of Chisholm's choice, undertook self-imposed four-match suspension including the loss of match payments and undertook a racial awareness training program. Everitt publicly apologised to Chisholm and his family and to the Aboriginal community.
- 2011 – Justin Sherman, a Western Bulldogs player was banned for four games for racially vilifying an unnamed Gold Coast Suns player. Sherman was ordered to attend an education program and pay $5000 to a charity chosen by the Suns. He spent four weeks in the VFL while serving his AFL suspension.
- 2011 – There were several reported incidents of spectator racial abuse. North Melbourne Football Club's Majak Daw was racially abused by a spectator at a VFL game and Hawthorn Football Club's Lance Franklin was also racially abused by a fan at an AFL match in Launceston.
- 2012 – AFL's national community engagement manager Jason Misfud claimed that Adelaide Football Club recruitment manager Matthew Rendell suggested that clubs may adopt a policy of only recruiting Aboriginal players with at least one white parent. Rendell resigned as a result of the controversy regarding his comments. He apologised for his comments but believed they were taken out of context.

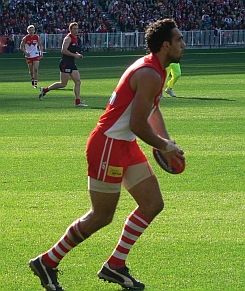
Adam Goodes, indigenous Sydney Swans player

- 2013 – Adam Goodes, a Sydney Swans player in a match against Collingwood Magpies at Melbourne Cricket Ground during the AFL's Indigenous Round was called an ape by a 13-year-old Collingwood supporter. Upon hearing the abuse, Goodes pointed the girl out to security and she was ejected from the stadium. Goodes stated he was gutted by the comments but stated that: "People need to get around her. She's 13, she's uneducated." Goodes subsequently was criticised by several commentators for pillaring a 13-year-old girl.
- 2014 – A 70-year-old man received a penalty notice for offensive behaviour after allegedly making racists comments about Sydney Swans players Lance Franklin and Adam Goodes during a match against Western Bulldogs at Etihad Stadium. The man was reported to police by other spectators.
- 2014 – Majak Daw, a North Melbourne Kangaroos player was racially abused in a match against Hawthorn at Aurora Stadium, Launceston. The male spectator was evicted from the ground.
- 2014 – Nic Naitanui, a West Coast Eagles player, was racially abused three times by Vinh Phuc Nguyen on Twitter. Nguyen pleaded guilty to three counts of using a carriage service to menace, harass or cause offence. He was banned from contacting the Naitanui or other West Coast Eagles players and creating a Twitter account.
- 2015 – Adam Goodes, during matches played outside Sydney, was constantly booed by spectators. It was suggested that this may have been related to the 2013 incident (see above), to his speaking out on Indigenous issues during his 2014 Australian of the Year award, his playing style, or a dance he directed at opposition fans during the Indigenous round. However the booing was mostly attributed to racism, and in 2019, just prior to the release of two documentaries about these events (The Final Quarter and The Australian Dream), the AFL and all of its 18 clubs issued an unreserved apology for the sustained racism and events which drove Goodes out of the game.
- 2016 – A spectator threw a banana at Eddie Betts as he was playing for the Crows against Port Adelaide, as a form of racial abuse. (Note: A banana has long been used as a form of racial abuse in sport, originating in Europe and England in the 1980s. It is intended to imply that the target is a monkey.)
- 2020 - Leroy Larson, a St Mary's Football Club senior player in the NTFL, was found guilty on 21 February of breaching the AFL's National Vilification and Discrimination Policy for a comment made against Tiwi Bombers forward Austin Wonaeamirri in NTFL round 17 on 8 February at Marrara Stadium and given a five-week ban. He had already used his one avenue of appeal to overturn a life ban in 2018. He was de-registered as an AFL player on 26 February.
- 2023 – More people have been reporting racial abuse against players. In April 2023, the AFL confirmed 23 reported incidents of racial abuse in AFL, VFL, and the Talent League games since the season began. Abuse had occurred on social media as well as at games. Four Indigenous players – Brisbane's Charlie Cameron, Adelaide's Izak Rankine, and Fremantle's Michael Walters and Nathan Wilson – had received abuse, over a period of two days. The incidents were investigated by AFL's integrity unit, headed by social inclusion manager Tanya Hosch. AFL executives anticipate that the upcoming 2023 Australian Indigenous Voice referendum may lead to increased reporting of incidents of racial abuse, which is not a bad thing.
- 2024 – The AFL implemented a "social inclusion clause" into its contract renewals with Seven Network and Foxtel specifying that commentator panels could not be all white men.

=== Boxing ===
- 1890s – Peter Jackson, who was born in the West Indies but adopted Australia as his country, was discriminated in the United States with several boxers including Jim Corbett and John L. Sullivan refusing to fight coloured men.

=== Cricket ===
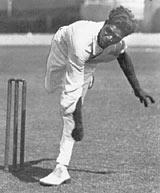
Indigenous fast bowler Eddie Gilbert

- 1900–1930 – Several researchers have suggested that indigenous cricketers Eddie Gilbert, Jack Marsh and Albert Henry were discriminated because of their race by Australian cricket selectors.
- 2003 – Australia batsman Darren Lehmann was banned for five one-day games for yelling a "racially motivated obscenity" after he was run out during victory over Sri Lanka in the VB Triangular Series in Adelaide.
- 2006 – International Cricket Board investigated racial taunts by Australian cricket crowds at black members of the South African team during tour of Australia 2005–2006.
- 2008 – Indian cricketer Harbhajan Singh allegedly called Andrew Symonds a 'monkey' during a Test match in Australia. Singh was handed a three-game ban for racial abuse but this was downgraded to a fine on appeal.
- 2018 – Nearly a dozen fans were ejected from the MCG in Melbourne for making racist chants towards Indian players.
- 2021 – Six Australian spectators allegedly directed racist remarks at two Indian cricketers Jasprit Bumrah and Mohammed Siraj during the third test of India against Australia in Sydney. They were asked to leave the stadium as directed by the NSW Police.

=== Soccer ===
- 2000 – It was alleged that Perth Glory striker Bobby Despotovski had racially abused Melbourne Knights defender Ransford Banini by calling him a "black monkey". Despotovski denied this, and instead claimed that he had said "shut up monkey".
- 2008 – South Korean-born Lee Corey, a referee, abandoned a South Australian State League fixture between NAB and Port Pirie-based Northern Demons at Thelstone Reserve due to numerous racial taunts by spectators.
- 2012 – Adelaide United fan was banned for two years after racially abusing Paul Ifill from the Wellington Phoenix at Hindmarsh Stadium. The fan was found to have breached the Football Federation Australia (FFA) Spectator Code of Behaviour. A member of the public identified the fan.
- 2014 – Ali Abbas Al-Hilfi, a Sydney FC player, alleged that Western Sydney Wanderers FC striker Brendon Santalab racially vilified him during a match at Allianz Stadium. The FFA Disciplinary Committee dropped the charges of racial vilification against Santalab, citing a lack of evidence and the possibility that Abbas may have misheard the comments made. Abbas was disappointed with the outcome.
- 2022 – During the club's 2022 Australia Cup campaign, in which the club reached the final (a first for any non-A-League Men club), various Sydney United fans booed the Welcome to Country before making Nazi salutes, bearing flags and banners supportive of the Ustaše movement (including one that resembled the flag of Nazi Germany) and chanting the Ustaše chant Za dom spremni! ("For Homeland – ready!" in Croatian. This caused major controversy, leading to bans, charges and sanctions on both fans and the club itself. Sydney United fans hurled homophobic and racist abuse at an APIA Leichhardt player of Aboriginal descent and at Yianni Nicolaou (who is of Greek descent) in 2023 in the NPL, which also saw Sydney United face sanctions.
- 2026 – Brisbane Roar striker Justin Vidić, who is of Serbian descent, alleged that Melbourne City striker Medin Memeti, who is of Albanian descent, pejoratively referred to him as a "gypsy". (Note: See Albania–Serbia relations for further context) The claims were dismissed by Football Australia due to a lack of evidence.

=== Hockey ===
- 1993 – Nova Peris, gold medallist at the 1996 Atlanta Olympics has stated she encountered racial abuse during the National Championships.

=== Rugby league ===
- 1980s – Olsen Filipaina, a New Zealand international, revealed he was racially abused when he started playing professional rugby league in Australia.
- 1997 – Chris Caruana, a North Sydney Bears player was fined, dropped from first grade and told to publicly apology after allegations that he racially vilified Newcastle Knights player Owen Craigie.
- 1998 – Barry Ward, a Canterbury Bulldogs player was fined $10,000 after a complaint by St George Dragons players Anthony Mundine and Robbie Simpson that Mundine was racially abused by Ward.
- 2002 – Chris Anderson, coach of the Cronulla Sharks was criticised for making the following comment regarding indigenous player Preston Campbell: "If Preston wasn't black it wouldn't have created the media kerfuffle that it has."
- 2005 – Bryan Fletcher, the South Sydney Rabbitohs captain gave Dean Widders, an indigenous player with Parramatta Eels a verbal racist spray in an NRL game at Parramatta Stadium. Fletcher was sacked as captain, suspended for one game and fined $10,000. Fletcher was also required to help Widders with his work in the Aboriginal community. Widders accepted Fletcher's apology.
- 2007 – Anthony Mundine, a former St George Dragons player and Nathan Merritt, a South Sydney Rabbitohs player claimed racism was behind them not being selected in representative teams. Geoff Carr, NSW Rugby League general manager, disputed the claim by highlighting several players from different racial backgrounds – Hazem El Masri, Jarryd Hayne, Preston Campbell and Amos Roberts being selected.
- 2008 – Sper Vega, a spectator at a match between Parramatta Eels and Brisbane Broncos at Parramatta Stadium, was banned for five years for calling Petero Civoniceva "a monkey”.
- 2010 – Timana Tahu walked out of the New South Wales State of Origin camp after alleging that assistant coach Andrew Johns had racially vilified Queensland star Greg Inglis in a team meeting. Johns denied making the comments but stepped down from the team.
- 2013 – Greg Inglis, the high-profile rugby league player and proud supporter of the Australian Human Rights Commission's Racism. It Stops With Me campaign, was the target of cyber racism.
- 2014 – Ben Barba, a Brisbane Broncos player was subjected to racial abuse on Instagram. The offender was a Country Rugby League (CRL) player who was banned from participating in rugby league activities until he completed a cultural awareness program.
- 2017 – Brisbane Broncos player Sam Thaiday apologized for making a racist comment on the NRL Footy Show. He said on the show, "I reckon Halle Berry was my first [crush]. That's when I went through my Jungle Fever phase- liking dark girls there for a little while. But then I figured it out, if it ain't white, it ain't right."
- 2020 – Fans were ejected from Central Coast Stadium stadium after alleged racial abuse of indigenous Penrith Panthers player Brent Naden.

=== Rugby union ===
- 2005 – Justin Harrison playing for the New South Wales Waratahs admitted to a racial slur against Cats winger Chumani Booithen during a Super 12 match. He was given a three game suspension.

=== Tennis ===
- 1980 – Before Evonne Goolagong-Cawley's 1980 Wimbledon Championships final, an unnamed Australian Premier stated that he hoped that she "wouldn't go walkabout like some old boong."
- 2001 – Lleyton Hewitt was involved in a racism dispute whilst playing James Blake at the 2001 US Open. During the match, a black linesman twice foot-faulted Hewitt on crucial points in the third set and Hewitt asked the Swiss umpire Andreas Egli to remove the linesman. Hewitt said: " Look at him (the linesman) and tell me what the similarity is (beckoning towards Blake)". Hewitt said: "I don't think I said anything racial out there. It was a conversation between me and the umpire".
- 2009 – Brydan Klein racially abused South African Raven Klaasen by calling him a kaffir at a match at Eastbourne, England. Klein apologised and said: "It was not my intention to racially vilify my opponent or cause offence to anybody else and I am deeply embarrassed that I behaved in this manner. I deeply regret my serious error in judgment in using this word and I am very sorry for the offence this has caused." Klein was suspended by the Association of Tennis Professionals (ATP) and the Australian Institute of Sport for six months and fined $14,000. He was also required to complete a racial sensitivity training course approved by the ATP. He later fined an additional $10,000 by the ATP.

== Sports commentators ==
- 1999 – Sam Newman appeared on Nine Network's Footy Show in blackface to impersonate Nicky Winmar, who was unable to appear on the show due to car trouble.
- 2005 – Rex Hunt apologised to Collingwood's Leon Davis for his commentary that: "Neon Leon hasn't lit up tonight, he's as black as a dog's..." during Collingwood's match against Essendon Football Club.
- 2006 – Dean Jones, a former Australian test cricketer, was sacked by Ten Sports, after saying on live television that: "the terrorist has got another wicket" after South African cricketer Hashim Amla, a devout Muslim, took the catch to dismiss Sri Lankan Kumar Sangakkara during the fourth test in Colombo. Jones apologised for the comment and said: "It was a silly and completely insensitive thing to say and, obviously, it was never supposed to be heard over the air. I am truly sorry to have caused offence to anybody and the last thing I intended was to be disrespectful." '
- 2010 – Mal Brown, a former Australian rules player, apologised for referring to Aboriginal AFL players as "cannibals" and that he could not select Nicky Winmar or Michael Mitchell because "there were no lights" at the poorly lit Whitten Oval during a promotion for the E. J. Whitten Legends Game. The comments prompted AFL CEO Andrew Demetriou to express his disgust.
- 2013 – Eddie McGuire, Collingwood President and media commentator, apologised to Adam Goodes after suggesting Goodes be used to promote the musical King Kong. McGuire said "I'm happy to stand here in front of everybody, in front of the country, and say we do not stand for racial vilification. I let myself down because I had a slip of the tongue."
- 2013 – The ABC's rugby league commentator David Morrow apologised for a racist remark whilst broadcasting St George-Manly match at Jubilee Oval. Morrow, who did not believe he was on-air at the time, joked about the difficulty of seeing dark-skinned people at night. His comment: "Dats da only way you can tell when there’s anyone there, it’s when dey smile".
- 2014 – The ABC's rugby league commentator Warren Ryan was alleged to say "a line in a movie where the old darky says, someone says, 'quittin' time" calling the game between Sydney Roosters and Canterbury Bulldogs. Fellow broadcaster David Morrow was stood down and Ryan resigned. Ryan stated that: "The word used to describe the character was a direct quote from the film. There was no offence intended, so I won't be apologising. It would be insincere."
- 2024 – The AFL implemented a "social inclusion clause" into its contract renewals with Seven Network and Foxtel specifying that commentator panels could not be all white men.

== See also ==
- List of Indigenous Australian sportspeople
- List of Australian sports controversies
- Reconciliation in Australia
- Racism in Australia
- Sport in Australia
- Racism in sport
