= Sydney United 58 FC at the 2022 Australia Cup =

Sydney United
2022 season
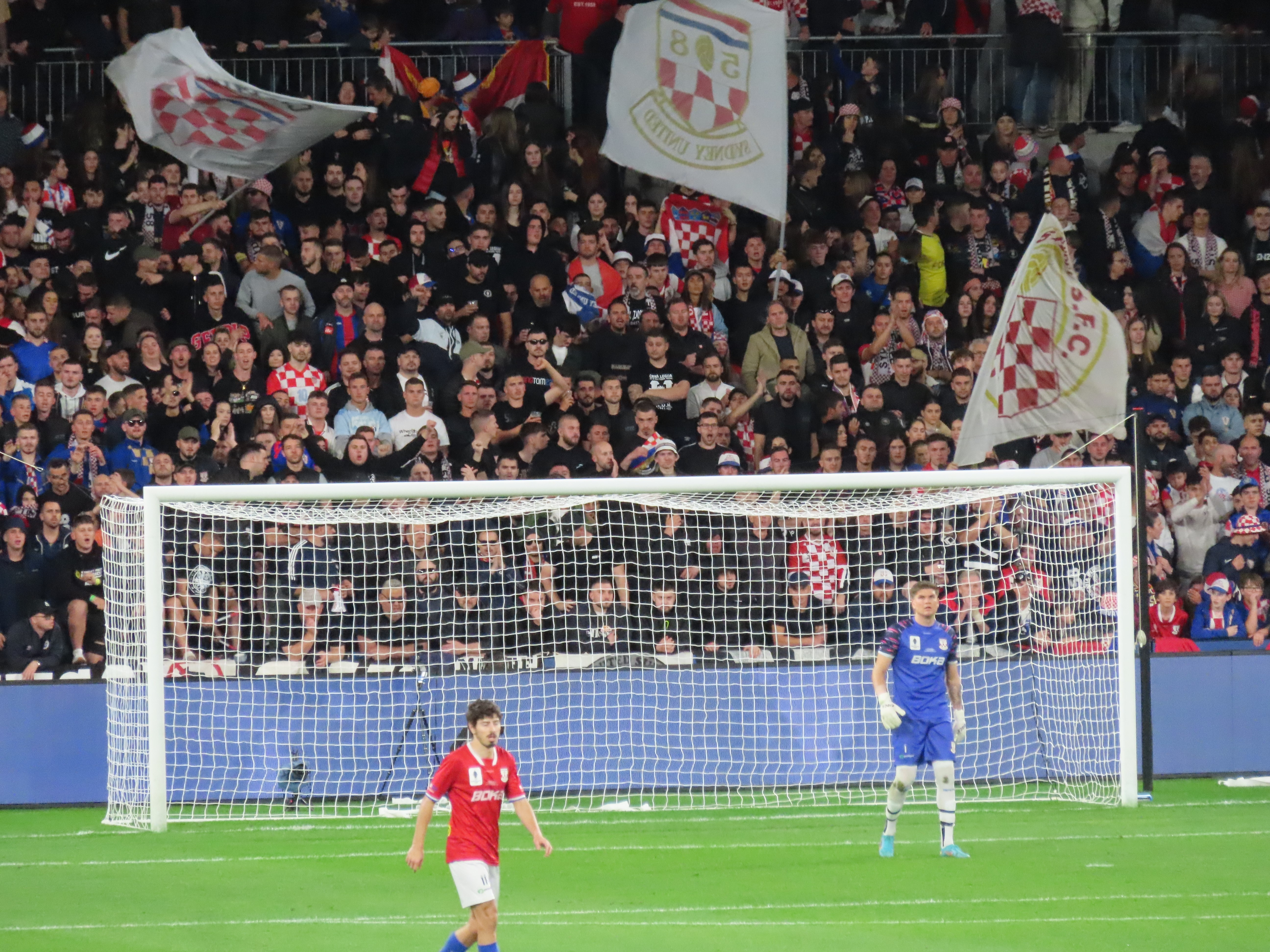
- Fans of Sydney United in 2022
- President: Mark Ivancic
- Head coach: Miro Vlastelica
- First match: Fourth preliminary round
- Last match: Final
- Highest home attendance: 16,641 vs Macarthur FC (1 October 2022)
- Lowest home attendance: 526 vs Monaro Panthers (3 August 2022)
- Biggest win: 7–0 vs Quakers Hill Junior SC (12 May 2022)
- Biggest defeat: 0–2 vs Macarthur FC (1 October 2022)

Sydney United 58 Football Club is an Australian semi-professional association football club, founded in 1958. Sydney United entered the 2022 Australia Cup in the fourth round of the preliminary stage where they progressed through to the final at Commbank Stadium against Macarthur FC. Sydney United became the first National Premier Leagues club to compete in a cup final and the second state league side to have knocked out two A-League clubs, that being Western United and Brisbane Roar.

Despite their accomplishments, Sydney United faced numerous incidents regarding with the fans in attendance at the Australia Cup final. Many fans were involved in numerous chants and gestures that relate to fascist beliefs and movements, most notably with the Ustaše and the Nazis. Sydney United were sanctioned and fined whilst three men in attendance were investigated and charged with use of the flag of Nazi Germany and was held in court at Parramatta.

== Route to Australia Cup ==
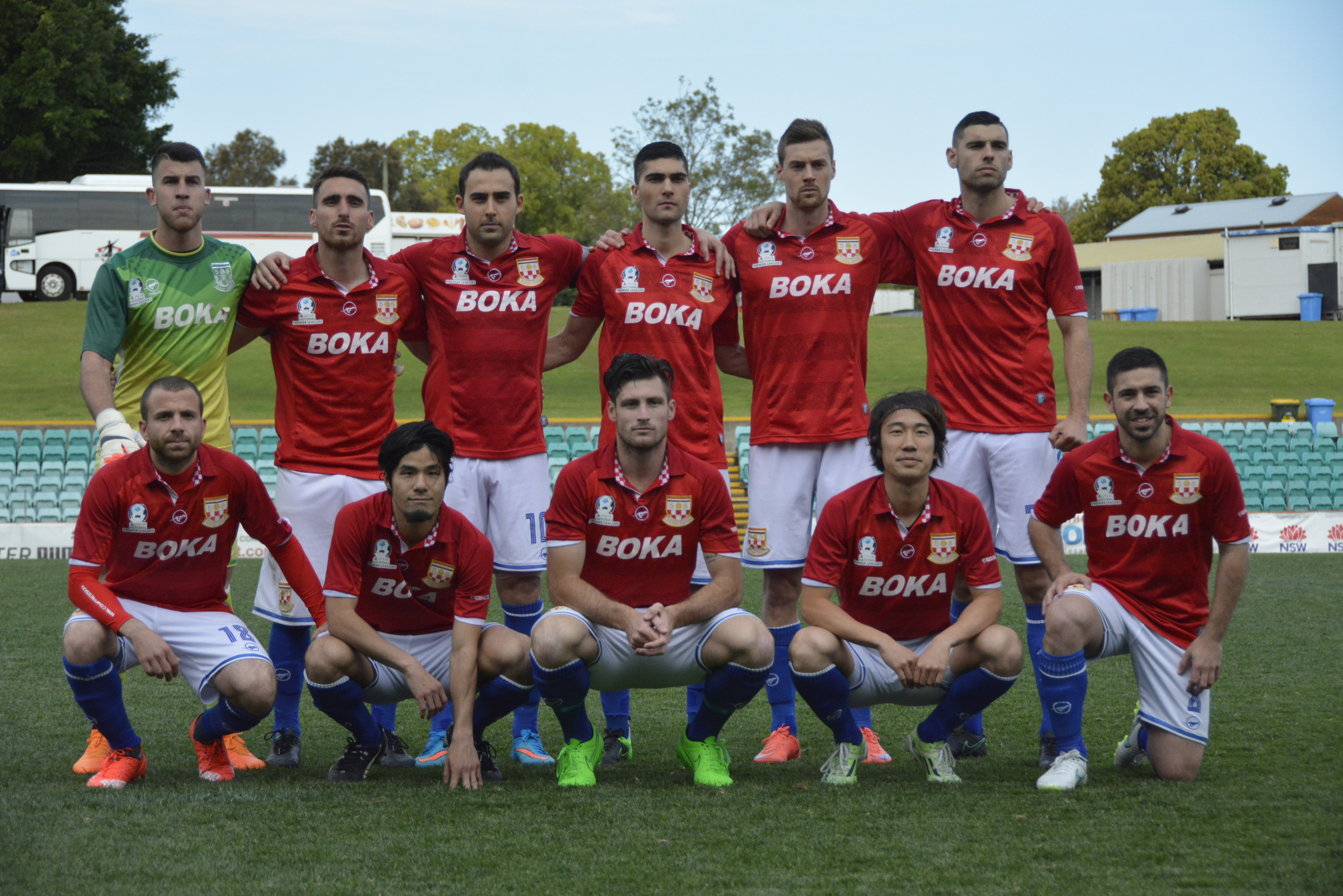
Sydney United 58 in 2016

Sydney United played their seventh cup campaign since its inauguration in 2014. In the previous edition, Sydney United was knocked out in the preliminary stage of the competition. The club has been knocked out four times in the Round of 16 and once in both the Round of 32 and the preliminary stage of the competition. Before the establishment of the A-League, Sydney United played in two cup finals in 1987 and 1993 of the NSL Cup, winning the first during the NSL era. Prior to the commencement of the 2022 Australia Cup, Sydney United finished the 2022 National Premier League NSW season in 8th. They won twice and drew once out of their last five games with a 3–1 win over APIA Leichhardt on the last matchday. The club's highest goalscorer was Chris Payne with 9 goals during the league season.

Sydney United entered the Australia Cup preliminary stage in Round 4. They progressed through towards Round 7 of the preliminary stage following wins against Quakers Hill Juniors, Rockdale Ilinden and Hurstville FC. Sydney United's opponent in Round 7 were Northern Tigers and was played on 15 June 2022. Hamish Mahon opened the score for the Tigers before Patrick Antelmi tied the score in the 38th minute. Anthony Tomelic scored the game-winner in the 87th minute of the match and sealed the 2–1 lead for his side. As a result, Sydney United qualified for the 2022 Australia Cup. The draw for the Round of 32 was announced on 29 June 2022 with Sydney United playing against Monaro Panthers at home.

== Summary ==
=== Route to final ===
The Round of 32 tie against Monaro Panthers would be Sydney United's seventh time in competing this stage. It also marked the first meeting against Monaro who was participating in their first Australia Cup campaign, having recently won the Capital Football Federation Cup and Charity Shield that same year. Sydney United have won four of their last five Round of 32 matches, the last defeat being a 6–2 result to Blacktown City in 2016. The referee for the match was Jonathan Barreiro. The assistant referees were Andrej Giev and Matthew McOrist, with Ben Abraham named as the fourth official. The match was played on 3 August 2022 at Sydney United Sports Centre where Sydney United defeated Monaro 3–0 with goals from Patrick Antelmi, Chris Payne and Kyle Cimenti. As a result, United progressed to the Round of 16 for the fifth time in their history. Patrick Antelmi, the scorer for United's opening goal, brought his goalscoring tally to a total of nine goals, becoming one of all-time top scoring NPL players in the Australia Cup. Chris Payne's impact of one goal and two assists during the match was the joint-most goal involvements by any player in the round.

The Round of 16 draw was confirmed on 5 August 2022 with Sydney United playing against A-League club Western United. This marked the first meeting between Sydney United and Western United in the Australia Cup and the first time Western United have faced a member federation team in the competition. It was also the first time Western United had reached this stage of the competition. Western United would come into this match as A-League champions after their 2–0 victory over Melbourne City on 28 May 2022. The match saw Western United midfielder Nicolas Milanovic reunite with his former youth side, whilst Patrick Antelmi, a former Western United player, was set to play against them. Both players were signed by Western United on 17 July 2020. The referee for the match was Stephen Lucas. Andrej Giev and Matthew McOrist returned as assistant referees, with Kelly Jones named as the fourth official. The match kicked off on 14 August 2022 with the scores held 1–1 by the end of extra time. The first penalty was notably converted by Noah Botic with a panenka before two missed shots by Western United led to Cristian Gonzalez scoring the winning penalty for Sydney United in a 4–3 shootout victory. Sydney United progressed through to the quarter-finals for the first time in their history and became the 10th member federation team to knock out an A-League club. The match also was their fifth that went to extra time, winning three out of the five they played; it is the joint-third most times of any team in the competition and more than any other member federation club.

The schedule for the quarter-finals was announced on 19 August 2022 with Sydney United facing Peninsula Power. Peninsula Power was participating in their third Australia Cup campaign, having only reached the Round of 32 in their previous two appearances. Former head coach, Aaron Philp, of Peninsula Power, most notably accomplished all three qualifications towards the Australia Cup before stepping down to assistant coach after being succeeded by Rick Coghlan as head coach. Like Sydney United, Peninsula Power would play in the quarter-finals for the first time in their history. Additionally, they are the fourth Queensland team to play at this stage of the Australia Cup. The referee for the match was Chris Beath. The assistant referees were Anton Schetinin and Ashley Beecham, with Ben Abraham named as the fourth official. The match kicked off on 28 August 2022 at A.J. Kelly Park where Sydney United won 1–0 against the Power after an early goal from Yianni Fragogiannis sealed the win for his side. Sydney United was noted for their reduced attacking threat due the absence of Patrick Antelmi who was out with injury, leading applaudment for United's defensive display during the match. Despite this, Sydney United became the first club outside of the A-League to reach the semi-finals of the Cup since the draw was made fully open in 2021. It was also the first time that United has reached this stage of the competition. Additionally, it was the third time Sydney United have defeated a Queensland team out of the three meetings they have encountered.

The semi-finals schedule was confirmed on 9 September 2022 with Sydney United drawn to play Brisbane Roar. Both sides competed at this stage for the first time in their history with a victory meaning either side could go against Oakleigh Cannons or Macarthur FC; it was the first time two state league teams were competing in the semi-finals of the cup. Brisbane Roar, in particular, were participating in their eighth cup campaign and is the seventh of the inaugural eight A-League members to reach the semi-final of the cup. In their previous round, Brisbane Roar defeated Adelaide United, who were three time cup winners, in a 2–1 victory with marquee forward Charlie Austin scoring his first goal for the Roar. Austin was highlighted to be a key man for Brisbane by Danijel Nizic in a podcast interview. The referee for the match was Adam Kersey. The assistant referees were Brad Wright and Adam Powers, with Kurt Ams named as the fourth official. The match kicked off on 11 September 2022 in front a crowd of 3,177 at Sydney United Sports Centre. The match went into extra time after the score tied 2–2 in regular time, Glen Trifiro would score the winner for Sydney United in the 105th minute of the first half to clinch a 3–2 victory over Brisbane Roar. As a result of the win, Sydney United became the first non-A-League side to reach the final of the Australia Cup. Having eliminated Western United and Brisbane Roar, they became the second federation side to knock out two A-League sides after APIA Leichhardt who defeated Western Sydney Wanderers in 2021 and Melbourne Victory in 2018.

=== Final v Macarthur FC ===
Sydney United contested against Macarthur FC in the Australia Cup final, following Macarthur's 5–2 win against Oakleigh Cannons on 14 September 2022. Both sides competed in the final for the first time in their history. Sydney United became the first National Premier Leagues (NPL) club to play in a cup final whilst Macarthur became the seventh A-League team to compete in the cup final. The venue was confirmed on 16 September 2022 to be set at Commbank Stadium in Parramatta, Western Sydney with over 10,000 tickets sold by 28 September 2022. Notable key players' were highlighted on both sides. For Macarthur, Al Hassan Toure was the highest goalscorer of the Australia Cup with four goals to his name and Daniel Arzani led the competition in chances created with 15 which was more than Sydney United's Chris Payne who tallied 7. Due to this, Macarthur was the most prolific team with 17 goals throughout the campaign, only Sydney FC scored more with 20 goals in the 2017 edition. In contrast, Sydney United's Danijel Nizic and Yianni Perkatis were highlighted as key men in United's defence, having only conceded 3 goals during the campaign – the best performance by any team in the tournament. Former youth and senior players of Sydney United represented Macarthur in the final, Tomislav Uskok, Nicholas Suman and Ivan Vujica competed against their former side. Vujica's parents, who were Croatian immigrants, both supported and worked at the club; his father, Marinko, was a board member of Sydney United and his mother, Ivanka, worked in the canteen of the home ground.

The match was dubbed "Old soccer" vs "New football" due to Sydney United's history in the defunct National Soccer League (NSL) who were going against Macarthur FC of the supposedly newly established A-League. The event also attracted figures from other sports and events, NRL coach Wayne Bennett gave United head coach Miro Vlastelica a phone call, wishing him luck for the match. Additionally, Canberra Croatia also suffered from reduced attendance due to their Croatian fans going to the final to support Sydney United despite the Canberra side playing in the grand final of NPL ACT. The referee of the match was Daniel Elder, who was the fourth official of two previous A-League grand finals in 2021 and 2022. The assistant referees were Andrej Giev and Andrew Meimarakis, with Kurt Ams and Brad Wright selected as the fourth and fifth official respectively. The match kicked off on 1 October 2022 in front of 16,461 spectators at Commbank Stadium where the final score ended in a 2–0 defeat for Sydney United after two penalties scored by Macarthur FC. As a result, Macarthur FC received their first title in their history with newly appointed head coach, Dwight Yorke, who achieved his first trophy in his fifth competitive game in charge. The Bulls also dedicated the title to captain Ulises Dávila who was grieving the loss of his wife, Lily; Dávila also changed his jersey surname to Lily's. Despite the loss, Sydney United had a strong backing with thousands of fans waving Croatian flags in the stands as a nod to the club's heritage. It would have also been the first time an NSL club had qualified for an Asian international competition if the match was won; the AFC Cup place was awarded to Macarthur.

== Fans behaviour and controversies ==
=== 2022 Australia Cup final ===
Before the commencement of the Australia Cup final on 1 October 2022, around 3,000 Sydney United supporters marched down Parramatta's Victoria Road with flares and banners generating a fiery atmosphere from kick-off. A complete attendance of over 16,000 stood for the traditional Welcome to Country that was performed by Erin Wilkins. Many fans chanted and made noise throughout the acknowledgment, however, sections from the United stands descended to booing whilst Wilkins spoke which continued throughout the national anthem. This followed throughout the match as the Network 10 broadcast also captured numerous fans of Sydney United appearing to make Nazi salutes and bearing flags that relate towards fascist movements and beliefs. Fans then continued to sing “Za dom spremni” (For Homeland - Ready) which was a chant used by the far-right Ustaše movement in Croatia in the 1930s and 1940s, In particular, one banner unveiled at CommBank Stadium bore a striking resemblance to the flag of Nazi Germany; largely red, it contained a white circle in the middle, with “EP” – an acronym for the club's Edensor Park home – written in the circle.

Images and videos started circulating through social media of the behaviour which garnered many criticisms from organisations and notable figures including fans labelling the entire spectacle “an embarrassment”. A statement from Football Australia (FA) was released and issued to The Sydney Morning Herald after the match, claiming that the majority of fans on Saturday night were well-behaved, and that only eight people were evicted. A NSW Police spokesperson said no arrests were made. Despite these claims, Darren Bark, CEO of the NSW Jewish Board of Deputies, denounced the symbols and salutes at the event, stressing their incompatibility with modern Australian society and their association with the atrocities of World War II. Bark also called for strong action, including lifetime attendance bans, against fans involved, and urged Football Australia to work with Sydney United to address the concerning views held by some supporters. Former Sydney United and Australian player Craig Foster also showed support of this on social media and live television. Erin Wilkins was telephoned an apology by the FA chief executive on behalf of the organisation, which insisted the behaviour was restricted to a small section of supporters. Both Sydney United and Macarthur FC were contacted for comments on the incident.

On 2 October, a statement was released on Facebook by Sydney United who pledged their commitment to track down fascist fans that attended on the night. NSW Premier Dominic Perrottet claimed that investigations had begun and that any fan who allegedly raised their arms in Nazi salutes will receive a lifetime ban from attending any more games. Jade North, a former Australian footballer and co-chairman of Football Australia National Indigenous Advisory Group, also released a statement of their commitment towards the investigation in hopes of playing a leading role in “Australia’s journey of Reconciliation”. An updated FA statement was released on the same day, concerning about the behaviours of the fans and an investigation had begun with the management of CommBank Stadium and NSW Police to determine strong and swift action on any identified anti-social behaviour, which may also be deemed as illegal in the state of NSW. It also stated that the FA will hold discussions with Sydney United about the behaviour of certain fans, which could lead to both individual and club sanctions. The Sydney Morning Herald claimed that numerous sources stated Football Australia approached Sydney United with concerns before the match about several of the banners regularly displayed by their fans, including one red flag with a white circle containing the letters "EP". The club rejected Football Australia's concerns and said ‘EP’ stood for Edensor Park.

On 3 October, Australian TV presenter Lucy Zelić, who is of Croatian descent, called for lifetime bans and a mandatory educational course, saying she felt devastated and embarrassed by her fellow countrymen. On 4 October, Macarthur FC forward Al Hassan Toure spoke of his celebration in front of the Sydney United fans after scoring the opening goal of the match. He recalled thrown projectiles at him during his celebration but was unaware of the fascist chants and behaviours, like many of his teammates, from the fans and had only found out due to social media. The next day, the FA issued a life ban for one Sydney United supporter, effective immediately. The spectator was not named but has been identified and would be unable to attend Football Australia-sanctioned matches, including all NPL, A-Leagues, Australia Cup, and national team matches, for life. On 7 October, the FA issued a life ban for a second Sydney United supporter, effective immediately. Both of these supporters received the same punishment and may be subjected to criminal charges. The FA also investigated in another case relating to a fan-based racist behaviour where one member of the crowd was imitating a monkey to Al Hassan Toure, who is of African descent, which was marred by performing Nazi salutes and chanting the "Za dom spremni" during the match. A spokesperson for FA said the incident was already on their radar before footage emerged on social media.

=== Sanctions ===
On 4 November 2022, the FA sanctioned Sydney United under the National Code of Conduct and Ethics for incidents that occurred at the cup final. After considering the club's response to the Show Cause Notice, Sydney United was issued with a $15,000 fine. Additionally, Sydney United has also been issued with several suspended sanctions including further fines, significant point deductions in the NPL NSW competition (up to 40 points deducted per sanction) and a suspended participation ban from the Australia Cup in 2023, 2024 and 2025. These suspended sanctions will be triggered if Sydney United failed to comply with specific requirements given by the FA over the following three years. An article was published on 11 June 2023 by The Age and The Sydney Morning Herald which investigated and covered the culture at Croatian-Australian clubs, whom openly engage in annual fascists celebrations while displaying emblems, flags and maps of the Ustaše regime. Days later, representatives of the Australian Jewish community and Sydney United held a meeting at the Sydney Jewish Museum to discuss and prevent racism within the club's supporters.

=== Other incidents and charges ===
In February 2023, Football Australia released another statement about an incident of racism after a complaint by an APIA Leichhardt player, who is of Aboriginal descent, outlining derogatory abuse in a league match against Sydney United. A letter sent to Football NSW cited the racial and homophobic slurs reverberated at him during a match, his teammate Yianni Nicolaou also faced racial abuse from the United fans. The said player alongside captain Adrian Ucchino also notified match officials in the 70th minute of the match about the abuse he received. On 23 February, Football Australia confirmed an investigation underwent and will monitor the investigative process and outcome to consider any implications on existing sanctions against Sydney United. On 27 April, Football NSW announced the conclusion of the investigation and states that Sydney United would be imposed of a $5,000 fine (payable within 30 days), a three-point deduction in the league and one league match played behind closed doors. Sydney United was charged with four offences related to alleged racial and/or homophobic abuse by its supporters.

On 5 March, three individuals who attended the Australia Cup final became the first to face charges under a newly implemented law in NSW that prohibits the display of Nazi symbols. The new law, which passed NSW parliament in August 2022, was introduced to address rising far-right extremism and antisemitism. The individuals were identified as Dominik Sieben, aged 24 from Beverley Park, Marijan Lisica, aged 44 from Doonside, and Nikola Marko Gasparovic, aged 45 from Wetherill Park. They were each issued a court attendance notice for displaying a Nazi symbol in public without excuse. On 19 April, all three men entered a not guilty plea and were excused from appearing in court. The cases for all three individuals were adjourned to 7 June where the three men were again excused from appearing. A final decision was made on 28 May, and all three men were found guilty and fined AU$500 on one count of publicly displaying a Nazi symbol without reasonable excuse. Sieben and Gasparovic received lifetime bans from attending football games while Sieben, who lodged a notice of appeal, was given a one-year ban.

== Matches ==
=== Preliminary round ===
12 May 2022 Round 4	Quakers Hill Junior SC	0–7	Sydney United	Glenwwod, Sydney
19:00 AEST (UTC+10)		Report		Stadium: Valentine Sports Park

25 May 2022 Round 5	Sydney United	1–0	Rockdale Ilinden	Edensor Park, Sydney
19:30 AEST (UTC+10)	Vlastelica (red card) 90+5'	Report		Stadium: Sydney United Sports Centre

7 June 2022 Round 6	Sydney United	2–0	Hurstville FC	Edensor Park, Sydney
19:30 AEST (UTC+10)		Report		Stadium: Sydney United Sports Centre

15 June 2022 Round 7	Northern Tigers	1–2	Sydney United	North Turramurra, Sydney
18:45 AEST (UTC+10)	Mahon 33'	Report	Antelmi 38'; Tomelic 87'	Stadium: North Turramurra Recreation Area

=== Australia Cup ===
3 August 2022 Round of 32	Sydney United	3–0	Monaro Panthers	Sydney
19:30 AEST (UTC+10)	Antelmi 37'; Vlastelica (yellow card) 54'; Payne 63' (pen.); Cimenti 79'	Report	(yellow card) 17' Carle; (yellow card) 58' Jenkins; (yellow card) 76' Senior; (yellow card) 90+2' Cole	Stadium: Sydney United Sports Centre; Attendance: 526; Referee: Jonathon Barreiro

14 August 2022 Round of 16	Sydney United	1–1 (a.e.t.) (4–3 p)	Western United	Sydney
14:00 AEST (UTC+10)	Perkatis (yellow card) 36'; Maia 56'; Gonzalez (yellow card) 109'	Report	(yellow card) 36' Imai; 43' Pain; (yellow card) 117' Josh Risdon	Stadium: Sydney United Sports Centre; Attendance: 1,358; Referee: Stephen Lucas
	Penalties
	Trifiro (penalty scored); Fragogiannis (penalty scored); Roberts (penalty missed); Cimenti (penalty scored); Gonzalez (penalty scored)		(penalty scored) Botic; (penalty missed) Garuccio; (penalty scored) Milanovic; (penalty scored) Wales; (penalty missed) Lustica

28 August 2022 Quarter-final	Peninsula Power	0–1	Sydney United	Brisbane
15:00 AEST (UTC+10)		Report	9' Fragogiannis; (yellow card) 54' Perkatis; (yellow card) 55' Tomelic; (yellow card) 65' Gonzalez; (yellow card) 75' Agamemnonos; (yellow card) 90+1' Clut	Stadium: A.J. Kelly Park; Attendance: 1,500; Referee: Chris Beath

11 September 2022 Semi-final	Sydney United	3–2 (a.e.t.)	Brisbane Roar	Sydney
14:00 AEST (UTC+10)	Bilic 24'; Vlastelica (yellow card) 63'; Antelmi 71'; Gonzalez (yellow card) 97'; Trifiro 105'; Antelmi (yellow card) 108'	Report	13' Danzaki; (penalty missed) 45+2' O'Shea; 63' (pen.) Austin	Stadium: Sydney United Sports Centre; Attendance: 3,177; Referee: Adam Kersey

1 October 2022 Final	Sydney United	0–2	Macarthur FC	Sydney
19:45 AEST (UTC+10)	Tomelic (yellow card) 50'; Roberts (yellow card) 90+2'	Report	32' (pen.) Toure; 90' (pen.) Dávila	Stadium: CommBank Stadium; Attendance: 16,461; Referee: Daniel Elder

== Squad ==
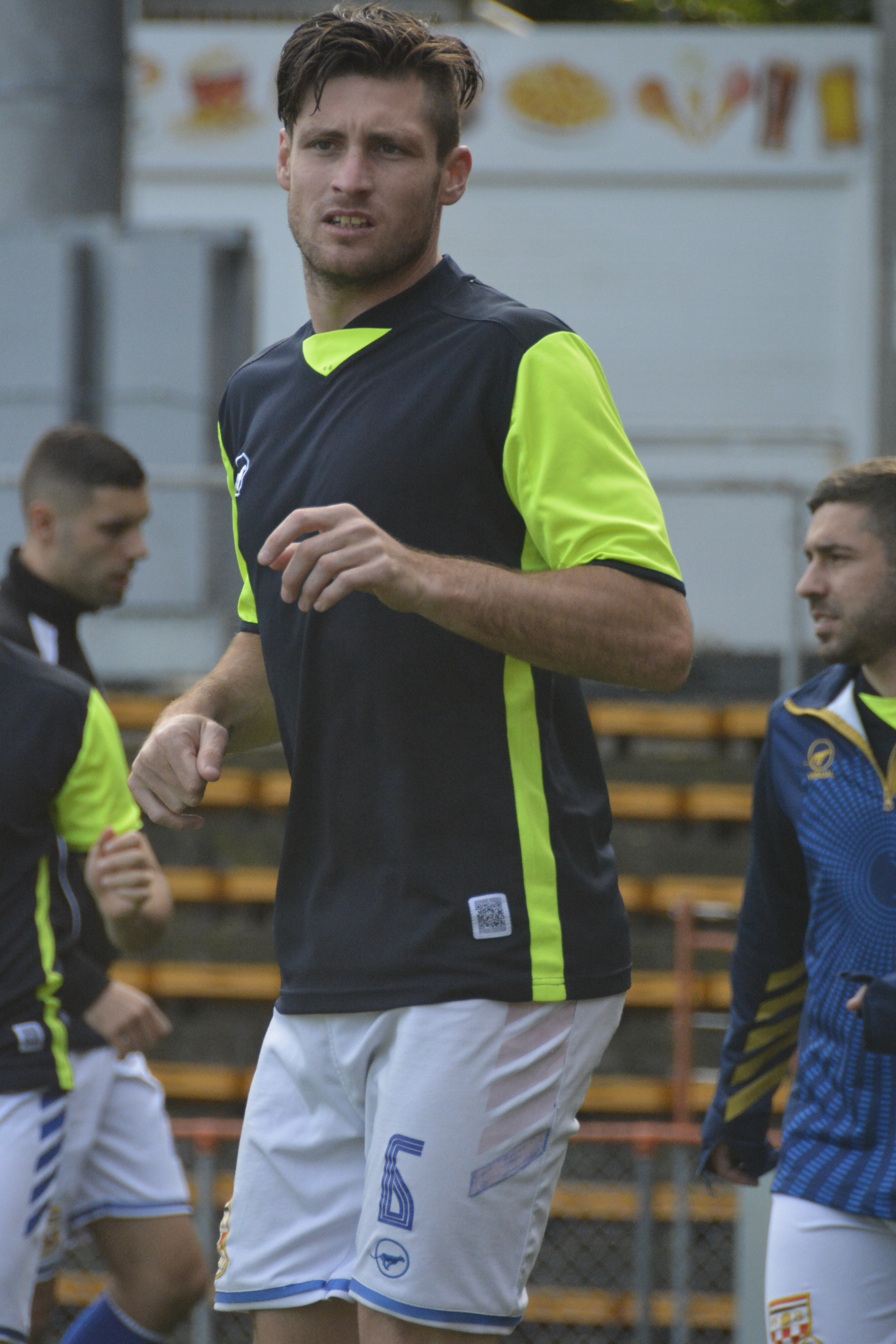
Chris Payne, the top league goalscorer for Sydney United

=== First team ===
Sydney United's coach for the 2022 season is Miro Vlastelica, who returned to United in May 2022 following the departure of the previous coach, Joe Haywood. Vlastelica was first appointed in May 2018, and resigned in September 2019 for personal reasons. Following the cup campaign, he led Sydney United for another season, before being succeeded by Zeljko Kalac in November 2023 after he took a coaching role within the club.

=== Statistics ===
Note: The appearances listed in the statistics section pertain exclusively to the Australia Cup.

No.	Pos.	Nat.	Player	Australia Cup			Discipline	
No.	Pos.	Nat.	Player	Apps	Goals	Asst	Yellow card	Red card
Goalkeepers
1	GK	(Australia)	Danijel Nizic	5	0	0	0	0
55/69 (Note: Husoy worn number 69 on 3 August.)	GK	(Australia)	James Husoy	0	0	0	0	0
Defenders
2	DF	(Australia)	Cristian Gonzalez	4	0	0	3	0
3	DF	(Australia)	Jordan Roberts	5	0	1	1	0
4	DF	(Australia)	Adrian Vlastelica	5	0	0	2	0
16	DF	(Australia)	Jacob Poscoliero	3	0	0	0	0
17	DF	(Australia)	Matthew Bilic	5	1	0	0	0
22	DF	(Australia)	Yianni Fragogiannis	4	1	0	0	0
Midfielders
5	MF	(Australia)	Anthony Tomelic	5	0	0	2	0
10	MF	(Australia)	Devante Clut	2	0	0	1	0
11	MF	(Australia)	Yianni Perkatis	5	0	0	2	0
13	MF	(Australia)	Jordan Ivancic	0	0	0	0	0
14	MF	(Australia)	Andrea Agamemnonos	5	0	0	1	0
15	MF	(Australia)	Tariq Maia	5	1	0	0	0
18	MF	(Australia)	Glen Trifiro	4	1	1	0	0
20	MF	(Australia)	Adrian Knez	0	0	0	0	0
Forwards
6	FW	(Australia)	Chris Payne	5	1	3	0	0
7	FW	(Japan)	Taisei Kaneko	5	0	1	0	0
8	FW	(Australia)	Kyle Cimenti	5	1	0	0	0
9	FW	(Australia)	Patrick Antelmi	3	2	0	1	0
