= Luiz Lobo =

Australian-Brazilian footballer, born 1990

Personal information
- Full name: Luiz Felipe de Oliveira Lobo
- Date of birth: 25 September 1990 (age 36)
- Place of birth: São Paulo, São Paulo (state), Brazil
- Height: 1.77 m (5 ft 9 1/2 in)
- Position: Midfielder

Senior career*
Years	Team	Apps	(Gls)
2014	Rydalmere Lions	1	(0)
2016–2018	UNSW FC	56	(26)
2019	Fraser Park	22	(14)
2020	Dunbar Rovers	11	(6)
2021–2022	Hakoah	36	(12)
2023–2024	NWS Spirit	45	(6)
2024	Sydney United 58	4	(0)

International career^{‡}
2023–	Australia (futsal)		
Medal record
Men's futsal
Representing Australia
Runner-up	2024 NSDF Championship
- * Club domestic league appearances and goals as of 25 November 2024 ‡ National team caps and goals as of 28 March 2024

Luiz Felipe de Oliveira Lobo, known as Luiz Lobo, (born 25 September 1990) is an association football and futsal player who last played for Sydney United 58 in the National Premier Leagues NSW and the Australia national futsal team.

Born in São Paulo, Brazil, Lobo moved to Australia on 28 June 2013 where he played for Rydalmere Lions, Fraser Park, Hakoah and NWS Spirit. He became an Australian citizen in November 2023 at NWS Spirit before moving to Sydney United in June 2024. In addition to association football, Lobo plays futsal for Enfield Allstars in the NSW Futsal Premier League.

Lobo received his first international call-up to the Australian national team in March 2024 ahead of the 2024 NSDF Championship. Australia finished runners-up after losing 9–2 in the final against hosts Thailand.

== Honours ==
Fraser Park

- NSW State League: 2019
