= Alec Urosevski =

Australian soccer player (born 1994)

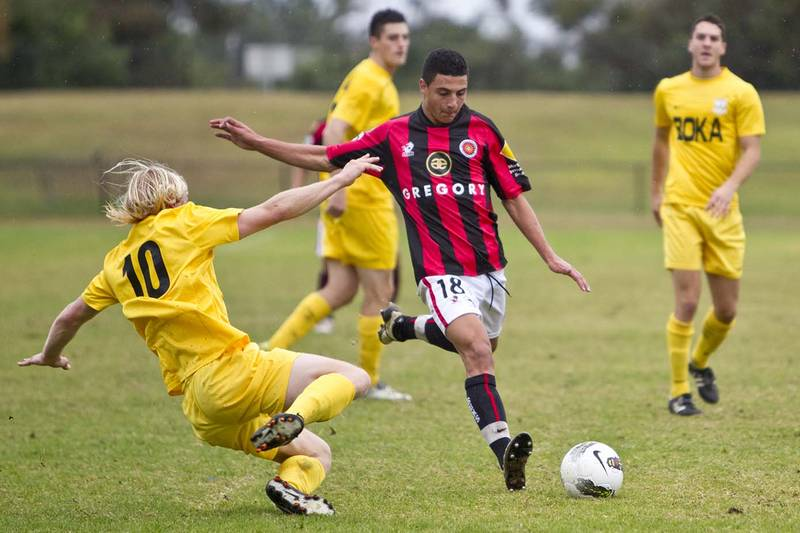
- Urosevski playing for Rockdale City Suns in 2012

Personal information
- Full name: Alec Urosevski
- Date of birth: 15 February 1994 (age 32)
- Place of birth: Sydney, Australia
- Height: 1.78 m (5 ft 10 in)
- Position: Striker

Team information
- Current team: Bankstown City
- Number: 7

Youth career
- St George
- Bankstown City Lions
- Sydney Olympic
- 2012–2014: Sydney FC Youth

Senior career*
Years	Team	Apps	(Gls)
2012	Rockdale City Suns	19	(8)
2012–2013	Sydney FC	2	(0)
2013	Rockdale City Suns	23	(4)
2013–2014	Sydney FC	8	(0)
2014	→ Sydney United (loan)	14	(2)
2015–2025	Rockdale Ilinden	252	(169)
2026–	Bankstown City	6	(4)
- * Club domestic league appearances and goals as of 29 June 2026 ‡ National team caps and goals as of 27 December 2012

Alec Urosevski (Macedonian: Алек Урошевски, Alec Uroševski, born 15 February 1994) is an Australian professional footballer who plays as a striker for Bankstown City FC. A former Sydney FC player, he spent over a decade with Rockdale Ilinden, becoming the club's all-time leading goalscorer and one of the most prolific forwards in National Premier Leagues NSW history. He helped Rockdale win the NPL NSW Premiership in 2020 and 2024 and earned multiple individual scoring honours.

== Club career ==
=== Sydney FC ===
In 2012, Urosevski made his debut for Rockdale City Suns FC team in NPL NSW. In the following year he joined with Sydney FC He made his A-League debut for Sydney FC against Central Coast Mariners coming on as a substitute. He played for Sydney FC for the next two season in the A-league.

Urosevski competed with Sydney FC Youth in 2013 Thanh Niên Cup, finishing in second place. Urosevski scored five goals in the tournament, winning the Golden Boot.

In April 2014, Urosevski went on to play with Sydney United, on loan from Sydney FC.

=== Rockdale Ilinden ===
Urosevski returned to join Rockdale City Suns FC team in NPL NSW side on 7 December 2014. In 2018, Urosevksi helped his side beat Blacktown City in the NPL NSW semi final, scoring a penalty to end the game 2-0. In 2020, Urosevski played a crucial role in Rockdale's premiership win, helping the club end their 51 year title drought and ending the season with 4 goals. During the 2022 season, he was the club top goalscorer, scoring 10 goals in 10 games making his side 9 games undefeated at the time. He scored 4 goals against Sydney FC Youth to send Ilinden to top 5 in the league table. At the end of the season, he came 2nd in the Golden Boot, coming 1 goal shorter than Sydney Olympic player Roy O'Donovan who scored 21 goals. He was also shortlisted for Player of the Year which was won by Jaiden Kucharski.

== Personal life ==
Urosevski works as a baker in Alexander’s Bakery which earned him the nickname "The Baker" from his teammates. He is happily married to Tatiana and has a son named Tommy and a daughter named Bella.

== Honours ==
Rockdale Ilinden FC

- NPL NSW Men's Premiers: 2020, 2024

Sydney FC

- Thanh Niên Cup Golden Boot: 2013
