= Liam McGing =

Australian soccer player (born 1998)

Personal information
- Full name: Liam McGing
- Date of birth: 11 December 1998 (age 27)
- Place of birth: Australia
- Height: 1.90 m (6 ft 3 in)
- Position: Defender

Team information
- Current team: Sydney United 58
- Number: 14

Youth career
- 2013–2014: FNSW NTC
- 2015–2016: Sydney United 58

Senior career*
| Years | Team | Apps | (Gls) |
| 2016–2019 | Sydney FC NPL | 53 | (0) |
| 2019 | Sydney FC | 0 | (0) |
| 2019 | Sutherland Sharks | 7 | (0) |
| 2019–2021 | Wellington Phoenix Reserves | 10 | (0) |
| 2019–2021 | Wellington Phoenix | 10 | (0) |
| 2021–2022 | Sydney FC | 1 | (0) |
| 2022 | Finn Harps | 5 | (0) |
| 2023 | Marconi Stallions | 20 | (0) |
| 2024– | Sydney United 58 | 81 | (2) |
- * Club domestic league appearances and goals as of 19 October 2026 ‡ National team caps and goals as of 22 May 2019

Liam McGing (born 11 December 1998) is an Australian professional soccer player who plays as a defender for Sydney United 58 in the National Premier Leagues NSW.

== Professional career ==
On 21 May 2019, McGing made his professional debut in the 2019 AFC Champions League in a group stage match against Kawasaki Frontale.

On 23 November 2019, McGing made his A-League debut, coming on as a sub for the Wellington Phoenix in their 2–1 win over the Brisbane Roar. It was the Phoenix first win of the 2019–20 season.

On 2 November 2020, McGing signed a one-year contract to stay on with the Phoenix.

In November 2021, McGing signed a short-term contract with Sydney FC. Following his release from Sydney after only making a single appearance, McGing travelled to Ireland, signing a contract with Finn Harps in the League of Ireland First Division. However he would only go on to make 5 appearances at the club, before returning home and signing with Marconi Stallions for the 2023 National Premier Leagues NSW season.

In December 2023, Liam signed with Sydney United 58 for the 2024 National Premier Leagues NSW season.

== Personal life ==
McGing is the younger brother of Jake McGing who also plays in the A-League.

== Honours ==
Sydney United

- National Premier Leagues NSW Championship: 2026
- Waratah Cup: 2025, 2026
