= Shunta Nakamura =

Japanese footballer

Shunta Nakamura 中村駿太
Personal information
- Full name: Shunta Nakamura
- Date of birth: May 10, 1999 (age 27)
- Place of birth: Chiba, Japan
- Height: 1.70 m (5 ft 7 in)
- Position: Attacking midfielder

Youth career
- Kashiwa Reysol Youth
- 2015–2017: Aomori Yamada High School

Senior career*
Years	Team	Apps	(Gls)
2018–2023	Montedio Yamagata	2	(0)
2019–2020	→ Thespa Gunma (loan)	4	(0)
2021–2023	→ Kamatamare Sanuki (loan)	49	(4)
2023	St George FC	0	(0)
2023	Mount Druitt Town Rangers	10	(1)
2024	Sydney United	25	(10)
2024	Nusantara United	6	(0)
Medal record
Representing Japan
AFC U-19 Championship
Gold medal – first place	2016 Bahrain
- * Club domestic league appearances and goals as of 17 February 2025

Shunta Nakamura (中村駿太, Nakamura Shunta; born May 10, 1999) is a Japanese professional footballer who plays as an attacking midfielder.

== Career ==
After being a protagonist with Aomori Yamada High School, Nakamura joined Montedio Yamagata for 2018 season.

After leaving Nusantara United, Shunta signed with SONIO Takamatsu in the Shikoku Soccer League for the 2025 season.
