= 2024 NSDF Futsal Championship =

Tournament details
- Host country: Thailand
- Dates: 24–28 March
- Teams: 4 (from 1 confederation)
- Venue: 1 (in 1 host city)

Final positions
- Champions: Thailand (1st title)
- Runners-up: Australia
- Third place: Afghanistan
- Fourth place: Malaysia

The 2024 NSDF Futsal Championship was an international futsal tournament organized by Thailand's organization National Sports Development Fund (NSDF). It was held in Thailand from 24 March to 28 March 2024. The tournament was won by Thailand.

== Group stage ==
Pos	Team	Pld	W	D	L	GF	GA	GD	Pts	Qualification
1	Australia	3	2	1	0	12	11	+1	7	Final
2	Thailand (H)	3	2	0	1	8	6	+2	6	Final
3	Afghanistan	3	1	1	1	10	10	0	4	Third place match
4	Malaysia	3	0	1	2	7	9	−2	1	Third place match

Updated to match(es) played on unknown. Source: Futsal Planet
(H) Hosts

== Third place match ==
28 March 2024

Afghanistan	3–2	Malaysia
	Report

== Final ==
28 March 2024

Thailand	9–2	Australia
Charoenphong 7', 31'; Thueaklang 9', 13', 38'; Chanporn 14'; Kittiphanuwong 15', 36'; Munphlai 40'	Report	Adele 28'; Giovenali 35'
