= Chris McStay =

Scottish association footballer (born 1996)

Personal information
- Date of birth: 22 May 1996 (age 30)
- Place of birth: Bellshill, Scotland
- Position: Midfielder

Team information
- Current team: St George FC
- Number: 88

Senior career*
| Years | Team | Apps | (Gls) |
| 2013 | Sydney University | 17 | (0) |
| 2014–2017 | Sutherland Sharks | 42 | (1) |
| 2018–2020 | Clyde FC | 73 | (7) |
| 2021 | Sutherland Sharks | 17 | (1) |
| 2022 | Rockdale Ilinden FC | 22 | (1) |
| 2023-2024 | Wollongong Wolves | 58 | (15) |
| 2025 | Rockdale Ilinden | 27 | (2) |
| 2026 | St George FC | 9 | (1) |
- * Club domestic league appearances and goals as of 11 May 2026

Chris McStay (born 22 May 1996) is a Scottish footballer who plays as a midfielder for St George FC in the National Premier Leagues NSW.

== Early life ==
Growing up, McStay's mother took him to football training and made sure he got to his matches, which is why he cites her as the largest influence on his career.

== Career ==
=== Clyde FC ===
After moving to Australia in his teens and playing for Sydney University, McStay travelled back to Scotland and signed for Clyde F.C. in the Scottish League 2. He made his debut for Clyde against Berwick Rangers. During his time with Clyde, he helped Clyde get promoted into the Scottish League One and was regarded as one of their most important players. He also received attention during his time with Clyde for scoring an overhead kick during a comeback cup win against Queen of the South. In addition, he was named League Two Player of the Month during his time at the club.

=== Return to Australia ===
After returning from Scotland, McStay had stints with his former club Sutherland and their cross-town rivals Rockdale. After that, he signed for Illawarra club Wollongong Wolves for the 2023 NSW NPL season.

== Style of play ==
McStay is known for his technical ability.

== Personal life ==
McStay is the son of Celtic FC legend Paul McStay who made over 650 league appearances for the club between 1981 and 1997. He also has two great uncles Jimmy and Willie who captained Celtic, and an uncle who also represented Celtic, Ray. His family resides in Australia.
