= Stephan de Robillard =

Mauritian footballer

Personal information
- Full name: Stephan Christopher de Robillard
- Date of birth: 2 December 2002 (age 23)
- Place of birth: Sydney, Australia
- Height: 1.77 m (5 ft 10 in)
- Position: Attacking midfielder

Team information
- Current team: Manly United
- Number: 7

Youth career
- 2014–2017: Marconi Stallions
- 2017–2020: Western Sydney Wanderers
- 2020–2021: Macarthur FC

Senior career*
Years	Team	Apps	(Gls)
2021–2023	Northbridge FC	12	(1)
2023–2024	Bulls FC Academy	16	(1)
2024–2025	Sydney United	37	(4)
2026–	Manly United	27	(5)

International career^{‡}
2017	Australia U17	2	(1)
2024–	Mauritius	11	(2)
- * Club domestic league appearances and goals as of 31 August 2026 ‡ National team caps and goals as of 20:00, 5 October 2026 (UTC)

Stephan Christopher de Robillard (born 2 December 2002) is a professional footballer who plays as an attacking midfielder for Manly United. Born in Australia, he plays for the Mauritius national team.

== Club career ==
De Robillard is a product of the youth academies of the Marconi Stallions, Western Sydney Wanderers, and Macarthur FC. In 2021, he debuted in the National Premier Leagues NSW with Northbridge FC. In January 2024 he moved to Sydney United. He helped them win the 2025 Waratah Cup.

In January 2026, Stephan moved to Manly United in the NPL NSW.

== International career ==
De Robillard was born in Australia to Mauritian parents, and holds dual Australian-Mauritian citizenship. In March 2017, he was called up to the Australia U17s for a friendly tournament. He debuted with the Mauritius national team in 2024.

=== International ===
As of match played 5 October 2026

Appearances and goals by national team and year
National team	Year	Apps	Goals
Mauritius	2024	7	0
Mauritius	2025	2	0
Mauritius	2026	2	2
Total		11	2

Scores and results list Mauritius's goal tally first, score column indicates score after each Robillard goal

List of international goals scored by Stephan de Robillard
No.	Date	Venue	Opponent	Score	Result	Competition
1	2 October 2026	Côte d'Or National Sports Complex, Saint Pierre, Mauritius	Sri Lanka	1–0	3–0	Friendly
2	5 October 2026	Côte d'Or National Sports Complex, Saint Pierre, Mauritius	Sri Lanka	1–0	2–3	Friendly

== Honours ==
Sydney United

- Waratah Cup: 2025
