= 2022 Australia Cup final =

Sydney United 58 and Macarthur FC Cup soccer match 2022

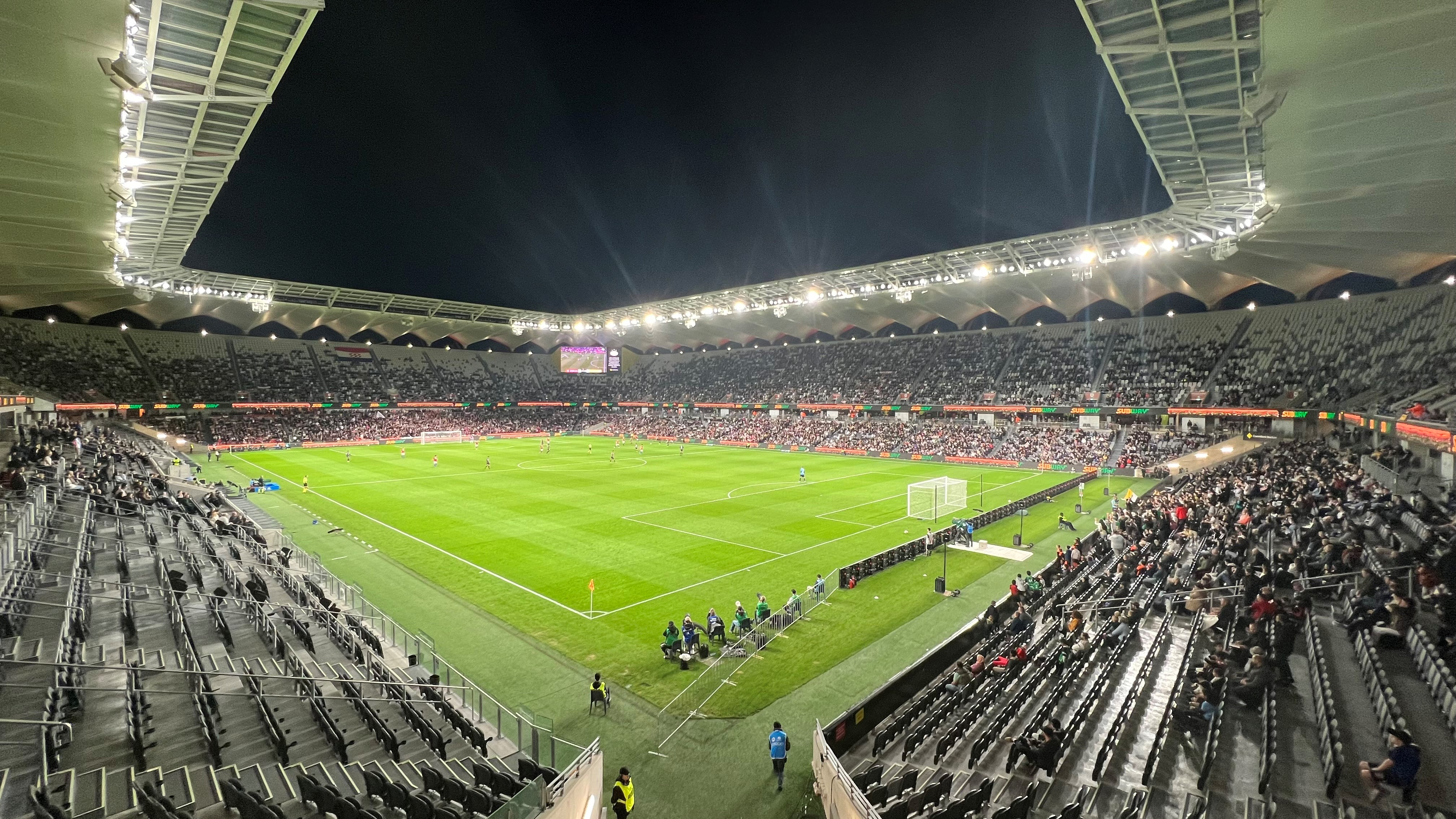
- Event: 2022 Australia Cup
Sydney United 58	Macarthur FC
0	2
- Date: 1 October 2022
- Venue: CommBank Stadium, Sydney
- Man of the Match: Ulises Dávila
- Referee: Daniel Elder
- Attendance: 16,641
- Weather: Clear; 14 °C (57 °F)

The 2022 Australia Cup final was a soccer match played at CommBank Stadium in Sydney, Australia, on 1 October 2022. The match was contested between New South Wales league side Sydney United 58 and A-League Men side Macarthur FC which for Sydney United 58 is also the first time a non A-League Men club had qualified for the Final of the Australia Cup. This final was the first Australia Cup final to be contested between two teams of the same state, with both Macarthur FC and Sydney United 58 being from Sydney. Macarthur FC won 2–0 to win their first trophy and Australia Cup and to also become the first away side to win the Australia Cup Final.

== Route to the final ==
Sydney United 58		Round	Macarthur FC	
Opponent	Score		Opponent	Score
Quakers Hill Junior	7–0 (A)	Fourth Preliminary Round		
Rockdale Ilinden	1–0 (H)	Fifth Preliminary Round		
Hurstville FC	2–0 (H)	Sixth Preliminary Round		
Northern Tigers	2–1 (A)	Seventh Preliminary Round		
Monaro Panthers	3–0 (H)	Round of 32	Magpies Crusaders United	6–0 (A)
Western United	1–1 (H); 4–3 (p)	Round of 16	Modbury Jets	4–0 (A)
Peninsula Power	1–0 (A)	Quarter-finals	Wellington Phoenix	2–0 (H)
Brisbane Roar	3–2 (a.e.t.) (H)	Semi-finals	Oakleigh Cannons	5–2 (A)
Note: In all results above, the score of the finalist is given first (H: home; A: away).

=== Sydney United 58 ===
Sydney United 58 started their 2022 Australia Cup campaign in the New South Wales fourth preliminary round, defeating Quakers Hill Junior by a score of 7–0. Fellow NPL NSW club Rockdale Ilinden were their opponents in the fifth preliminary round, prevailing 1–0. After defeating Hurstville FC 2–0 in the sixth preliminary round, the Northern Tigers were their final regional opponent, with Sydney United 58 narrowly winning 2–1. Monaro Panthers provided less resistance in the Round of 32 match. Reigning A-League Men champions Western United were defeated in a penalty shoot-out in the Round of 16. In the quarter-finals, they defeated Peninsula Power 1–0 away in Brisbane. The semi-final was won 3–2 after extra time at home against the Brisbane Roar.

=== Macarthur FC ===
Macarthur FC entered the Final Rounds of the tournament in the Round of 32 to defeat Magpies Crusaders United 6–0 at Mackay. Macarthur FC were away again for the Round of 16 match against Modbury Jets winning 4–0. The quarter-finals match at home against the Wellington Phoenix was won 2–0 to set up the semi-final which was won 5–2 against the Oakleigh Cannons.

== Match ==
=== Details ===
1 October 2022
19:45 AEST

Sydney United 58 (2)	0–2	Macarthur FC (1)
	Report	Toure 32' (pen.); Dávila 90' (pen.)

CommBank Stadium, Sydney
Attendance: 16,641
Referee: Daniel Elder

Sydney United 58	Macarthur FC

GK	1	(Australia) Danijel Nizic
RB	22	(Australia) Yianni Fragogiannis		(substituted off) 74'
CB	11	(Australia) Yianni Perkatis
CB	4	(Australia) Adrian Vlastelica (c)
LB	17	(Australia) Matthew Bilic
CM	14	(Australia) Andrea Agamemnonos		(substituted off) 55'
CM	5	(Australia) Anthony Tomelic	(yellow card) 50'
CM	15	(Australia) Tariq Maia		(substituted off) 65'
RW	3	(Australia) Jordan Roberts	(yellow card) 90+2'
LW	7	(Japan) Taisei Kaneko
CF	6	(Australia) Chris Payne		(substituted off) 74'
Substitutes:
GK	55	(Australia) James Husoy
DF	2	(Australia) Cristian Gonzalez		(substituted on) 74'
MF	13	(Australia) Jordan Ivancic
MF	18	(Australia) Glen Trifiro		(substituted on) 55'
MF	20	(Australia) Adrian Knez
FW	8	(Australia) Kyle Cimenti		(substituted on) 74'
FW	9	(Australia) Patrick Antelmi		(substituted on) 65'
Manager:
(Australia) Miro Vlastelica

GK	12	(Poland) Filip Kurto
RB	2	(Australia) Jake McGing
CB	6	(Australia) Tomislav Uskok
CB	5	(Australia) Jonathan Aspropotamitis
LB	13	(Australia) Ivan Vujica
CM	7	(Australia) Daniel De Silva
CM	11	(Australia) Kearyn Baccus	(substituted off) 79'
RW	35	(Australia) Al Hassan Toure
AM	10	(Mexico) Ulises Dávila (c)
LW	99	(Australia) Daniel Arzani	(substituted off) 74'
CF	31	(Australia) Lachlan Rose	(substituted off) 79'
Substitutes:
GK	1	(Australia) Nicholas Suman
DF	44	(Australia) Matthew Millar
MF	8	(Australia) Jake Hollman
MF	17	(England) Craig Noone	(substituted on) 74'
MF	24	(Tanzania) Charles M'Mombwa
MF	27	(Australia) Jerry Skotadis	(substituted on) 79'
FW	94	(Australia) Anthony Carter	(substituted on) 79'
Manager:
(Trinidad and Tobago) Dwight Yorke

Assistant referees:
Andrej Glev
Andrew Meimarakis
Fourth official:
Kurt Ams

Match rules

- 90 minutes
- 30 minutes of extra time if necessary
- Penalty shoot-out if scores still level
- Seven named substitutes

=== Statistics ===
Statistics	Sydney United 58	Macarthur FC
Goals scored	0	2
Total shots	8	32
Ball possession	39.2%	60.8%
Corner kicks	0	7
Offsides	1	2
Yellow cards	2	0
Red cards	0	0

=== Fan behaviour ===
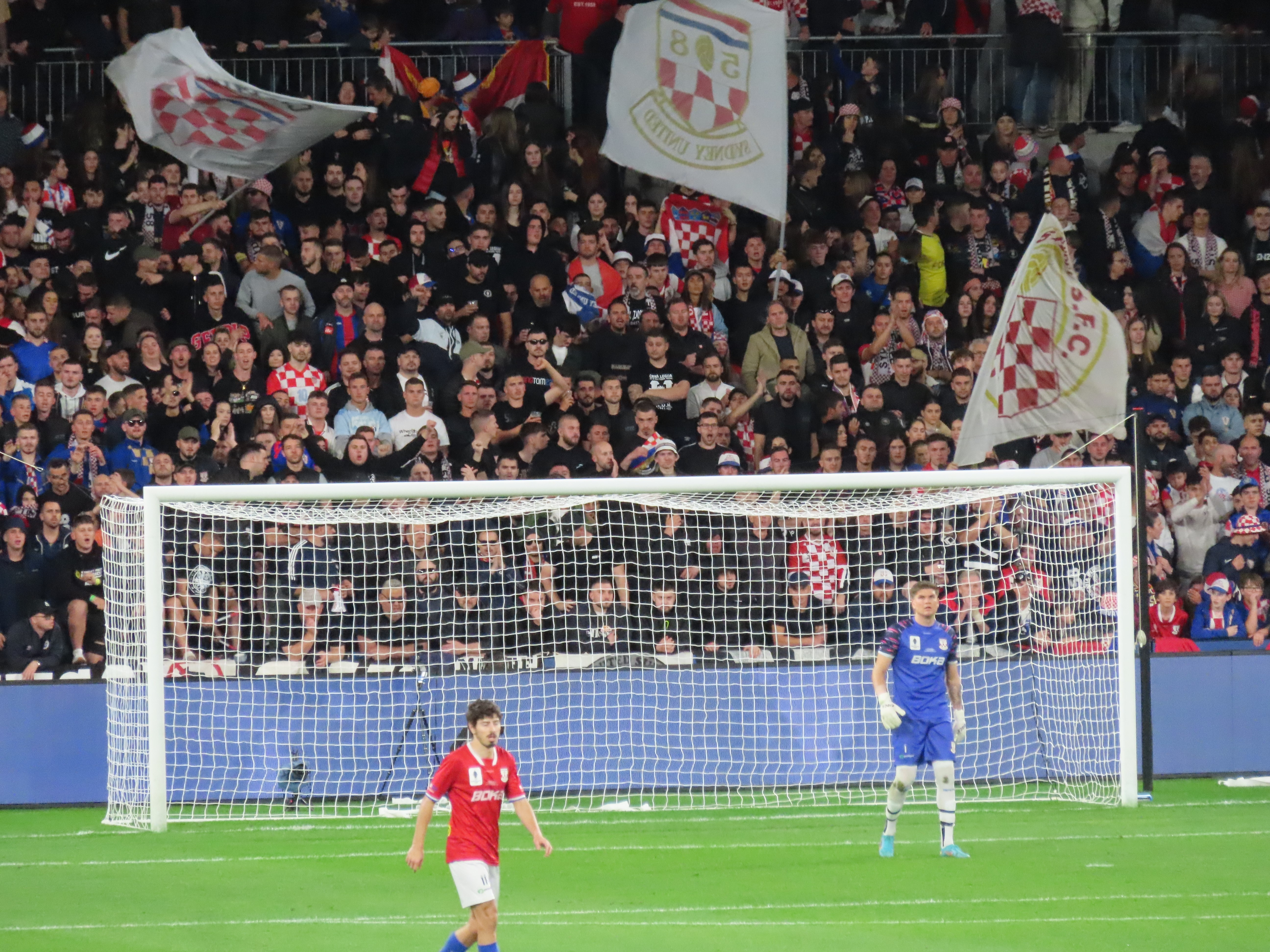
Sydney United 58 FC fans

During the match, Sydney United fans sung Za dom spremni (a fascist chant used by the Ustaše in Australia honouring the fascist Ustaše movement), booed the Welcome to Country, performed salutes commentators characterised as Nazi salutes, and waved flags associated with the extreme far-right Ustaše movement such as the HOS flag and the flag of the WW2 Nazi puppet-state of the NDH. In response to this behaviour, Football Australia stated: "Football Australia acknowledges that a very small minority of attendees engaged in behaviour that is not consistent with Football Australia's values and wider community expectations. Football Australia took steps during the match to address these isolated behaviours, including eight evictions."

Following a month long investigation, Football Australia sanctioned Sydney United 58 under breach of the National Code of Conduct and Ethics. The club was fined AUD$15,000, and received a number of suspended sanctions (including the possibility of further fines, point deductions in their National Premier Leagues NSW seasons, and a ban from the Australia Cup).

In June 2024, three Sydney United fans were convicted and fined $500 in a NSW court for deliberately and intentionally performing the Nazi salute at the 2022 Australia Cup Final.
