= Patrick Antelmi =

Australian soccer player (born 1994)

Personal information
- Full name: Patrick Antelmi
- Date of birth: 15 March 1994 (age 32)
- Place of birth: Sydney, Australia
- Height: 1.83 m (6 ft 0 in)
- Position: Forward

Team information
- Current team: Mounties Wanderers
- Number: 9

Youth career
- 2009–2012: Portsmouth
- 2012–2013: Leeds United
- 2013–2014: Wolverhampton Wanderers
- 2014–2015: Wigan Athletic

Senior career*
Years	Team	Apps	(Gls)
2015–2016	Blacktown City	42	(21)
2017	Wollongong Wolves	21	(9)
2018–2020	Sydney United 58	49	(19)
2020	Western United	1	(0)
2020–2025	Sydney United 58	120	(61)
2026–	Mounties Wanderers	27	(33)
- * Club domestic league appearances and goals as of 30 August 2026

Patrick Antelmi (born 15 March 1994), is an Australian professional footballer who plays as a forward for Mounties Wanderers in Football NSW League Two.

== Club career ==
=== Western United ===
On 17 July 2020, Antelmi signed for Western United for the remainder of the 2019–20 A-League season. He made his debut against Perth Glory, coming on as a substitute in the 90th minute in a 2–0 win. Antelmi was released at the end of the 2019–20 season. He immediately re-joined former club Sydney United.

== Honours ==
With Mounties Wanderers:

- (Australia) Football NSW League Two Premiership: 2026

With Sydney United:

- (Australia) National Premier Leagues NSW Championship: 2020
- (Australia) Waratah Cup Champions: 2023, 2025

With Blacktown City FC:

- (Australia) National Premier Leagues NSW Championship: 2016

=== Individual ===
- (Australia) Football NSW League Two Top Goalscorer: 2026 with Mounties Wanderers - 33 goals
