= Adrian Vlastelica =

Australian soccer player

Personal information
- Full name: Adrian Stephen Vlastelica
- Date of birth: 16 January 1995 (age 31)
- Place of birth: Sydney, Australia
- Height: 1.85 m (6 ft 1 in)
- Position: Center back

Team information
- Current team: Sydney United 58

Youth career
- APIA Leichhardt
- NK Adriatic
- Central Coast Mariners Academy
- Sydney United 58

Senior career*
Years	Team	Apps	(Gls)
2015–2017	APIA Leichhardt	30	(1)
2018–2022	Sydney United 58	85	(3)
2022–2023	Sydney FC	2	(0)
2023–	Sydney United 58	116	(5)
- * Club domestic league appearances and goals as of 19 October 2026 ‡ National team caps and goals as of 7 November 2022

Adrian Vlastelica is an Australian footballer currently playing for Sydney United 58 in the NPL NSW.

== Career ==
Vlastelica started his career at Apia Leichhardt Tigers playing in 2015 the NSW National Premier League. He was part of the 2017 Apia Leichhardt premiership winning side, before transferring to Sydney United in 2018 . He skippered the club throughout the 2022 Australia Cup helping Sydney United become the first National Premier Leagues club to reach the cup final against Macarthur FC, beating other A-League opposition Western United and Brisbane Roar in the process, having started their cup run in the Fourth round of qualification.

On November 4, 2022 Vlastelica signed his first professional contract with A-League club Sydney FC on a short-term, 3-month injury replacement contract after Alex Wilkinson was substituted off in the opening round of the 2022-23 A-League Men season with a long-term groin injury. He made his debut for Sydney in a 3–1 defeat to Brisbane Roar at Moreton Bay Stadium.

In February 2023 having made only two appearances for Sydney FC, Vlastelica returned to Sydney United 58, signing a new contract with the Edensor Park club.

== Honours ==
With Sydney United 58:

- (Australia) National Premier Leagues NSW Championship: 2020, 2026
- (Australia) Waratah Cup Champions: 2023, 2025, 2026
- (Australia) Australian-Croatian Soccer Tournament Division One Champions: 2023
