= Sydney United 58 FC =

Soccer club based in Sydney, New South Wales

- Full name: Sydney United 58 Football Club
- Nickname: Croatia
- Founded: 1958 (68 years ago)
- Ground: Sydney United Sports Centre; Edensor Park, New South Wales
- Manager: Miro Vlastelica
- League: NPL NSW
- 2026: 2nd of 16 (champions)
- Website: sydneyunited58fc.com
Home colours	Away colours

Sydney United 58 FC, commonly known as Sydney United or SU58, is a men's semi-professional soccer club based in the suburb of Edensor Park in Sydney, New South Wales (NSW). Its senior team plays in the National Premier Leagues NSW (NPL), in the second tier of the Australian league system. It also competes in the Australian Championship as a foundation club, and regularly enters the Australian-Croatian Soccer Tournament. It plays its home games at the Sydney United Sports Centre.

One of many Croatian soccer clubs in Australia, the club was founded in 1958 as Sydney Croatia, and was originally based in Surry Hills. It joined the burgeoning Football NSW and earned promotion to its first division in 1962. Following a decade of struggle, the club eventually won three titles in the 1970s and 80s, built the Sports Centre as their permanent home ground, and moved on to the National Soccer League (NSL) in 1984. Though Croatia failed to win a championship during their 21 seasons in the league, they finished runners-up thrice, and won an NSL Cup and two National Youth League championships. It adopted its current name in 1993. Sydney United returned to NSW's first division after the NSL's demise in 2004, and have remained in the league since.

Sydney United's honours include five NSW men's titles and nine Waratah Cups. It also won NPL national titles in 2013 and 2016. Its best performance in the Australia Cup is its appearance in the 2022 final. The club has fierce rivalries with the Marconi Stallions and Bonnyrigg White Eagles, based in the nearby suburbs of Bossley Park and Bonnyrigg Heights. Notable former players for the club include national team players Graham Arnold, Mark Bosnich, Craig Foster,Tony Popovic.

== History ==
Chart of yearly table positions for Sydney United in NSL

=== Early years ===
Formed in 1958 as a sports club, the Sydney United Football Club played its first season in 1958 (undefeated) in the old NSW Soccer Football Association (NSWSFA). After transferring to the NSW Soccer Federation (a breakaway league established in 1959), they competed in the third division. In 1961, they were promoted to the second division and in 1963 to first. Teams like St. George Budapest, Pan-Hellenic (who later become Sydney Olympic), APIA-Leichhardt, Yugal and Hakoah were United's major rivals.

For the seasons of 1964 and 1965 a part of the name changed (from Croatia to Metropolitan Adriatic), reverting to Croatia in 1966. However, this was not the last name change; the NSWSF ordered Croatia and Yugal in 1968 to anglicise their names after several incidents of crowd violence. Croatia changed their name again to South Sydney Croatia, since they resided in the South Sydney area with the local Croatian club at Surry Hills.

After a few lean seasons during the late 1960s and early 1970s, United won their first NSW Premiership in 1977 with Luka Fabijinic as coach and Atti Aboyni as the team's striker. The team beat Auburn 2–0 in front of a crowd of more than 6,500 at the Sydney Sports Ground. In 1978, Aboyni took over as captain and coach of the team. Croatia amassed 62 regular-season goals (Aboyni scoring 21 of them) and winning the minor premiership for the first time; they lost 2–1 to Sutherland in the grand final replay (the first game was a 1–1 draw) in front of 9,700 fans. Aboyni then coached again in 1979 to another minor premiership, before quitting after Croatia lost 0–2 to Sutherland in the preliminary final.

=== 1980s ===
In 1980, the club purchased a block of land in West Sydney to call their new home, now known as the Sydney United Sports Centre at Edensor Park. Sydney United won minor premierships in 1981 and 1982 the Premiership in 1982 and 1983. In last year of the NSW State League, the Third Grade Sydney United team defeated Canterbury-Marrickville on the Sydney Sports Ground 3–0 under coach Luka Fabijinic.

During the early 1980s, United were often drawing home attendances of 10,000 in the NSW State League; however, National League clubs averaged crowds of only 3,000. The national league needed a heavily supported club to enter national competition; however, the national league executive deemed it inappropriate for clubs with nationalistic names to enter the league and Croatia did not wish to change their name. However, after a National League shake-up in 1984, Sydney United (and its sister club, Melbourne Knights) were accepted into the national league under those names.

The new NSL club established a record in 1984. Over the season, the club had six coaches: after Aboyni quit and Harry Noon and Mick Jones were sacked, Bill Bicanacic and Bruno Vidaic took caretaker roles before Vedran Rozic took over. Rozic was brought from Croatian football club Hajduk Split as a sweeper, but accepted the role of player-coach as the club stumbled to sixth place in the standings. Large home crowds in these early national-league days made Croatia the most popular club in Sydney.

1985 and 1986 saw better success, with United winning the Northern NSL Division crown over powerhouse clubs such as Sydney Olympic, Marconi, and Sydney City. However, in the preliminary final they lost to Sydney Olympic. 1987 saw a lean season in the league, but a successful cup season which brought them another trophy: the Beach Fashions Cup, with a 2–0 aggregate victory over South Melbourne (with United strikers Robbie Slater and Graham Arnold scoring).

After finishing second in the normal season in 1988 Sydney United made its first NSL Grand Final, playing neighbours Marconi-Fairfield at Parramatta Stadium in front of a 17,000-strong crowd. Alan Hunter and Manis Lamond scored for Croatia, with Frank Farina and Zlatko Nastevski scoring for Marconi. With the score 2–2 after extra time, the game went to a penalty shootout. At 4–4, United's young midfielder Shane Clinch hit the post with his spot kick followed by Marconi veteran Tony Henderson scoring against Croatia's Tony Franken, winning the game for Marconi.

=== 1990s ===
Two more name changes, first to Sydney C.S.C. (Croatian Soccer Club) in 1992 and then to Sydney United, and the move from a winter league in Australia to a summer league saw a few lean seasons for the club during the early 1990s. The 1992–93 season saw the appointment of ex-Sydney Olympic coach Mick Hickman; however, he resigned during the pre-season. Ex-Socceroo defender Manfred Schaefer was appointed coach, and United finished seventh. United's youth policy, training players such as Tony Popovic, Zeljko Kalac, Ante Milicic and Ante Moric, was coming to fruition; these players later represented Australia at a number of levels. During the 1993–94 season, Zeljko Kalac keep an NSL-record 12 shutouts in 26 games. The club finished third, after leading the league.

Branko Culina replaced Schaefer as coach during the 1994–95 season; with a squad consisting of 75 percent locally produced players, United finished third. During the 1996–97 season, under Culina's the guidance United won another minor premiership and made its second Grand Final (this time in Brisbane). In front of an Australian soccer record crowd of 44,000, United lost 2–0 to Farina's Brisbane Strikers. Kresimir Maursic was voted the Prestigious NSL Player of the Year award, and David Zdrillic was the NSL's leading scorer with 21 goals (Ante Milicic finished second, with 19). However, the club lost players to overseas clubs: Popovic, Kalac, Milicic, Zdrilic and Robert Enes.

Former Socceroo striker David Mitchell took over as coach for the 1997–98 season. The club, while struggling, finished fourth with Abbas Saad its top scorer for the season. With Paul Bilokapic and Mark Rudan off to Northern Spirit, United won its third NSL minor premiership during the 1998–1999 season. Led by former St. Albans Dinamo defender Velimir Kupresak and talent from the youth league (such as Jacob Burns, Joel Griffiths and Mile Sterjovski), United reached the NSL Grand Final for the second time. However, in Melbourne against South Melbourne, United lost 3–2 (with goals by Mile Sterjovski and Danny Townsend) in front of 15,000 fans.

During a dark period in the club's history, in 1999–2000 Sydney United lost all their players (except Velimir Kupresak) and their coach to a new professional soccer club called Parramatta Power; however, the new team only lasted five seasons. Ex-Socceroo defender David Ratcliffe was appointed coach for that season. Although finishing last in the standings, United defeated Parramatta Power 1–0 at home to end the latter's final aspirations. Ex-Sibenik and United midfielder Ivan Petkovic took over as coach after Ratcliffe was sacked in January 2000.

=== 2000s ===
Former defender Alan Hunter returned to Edensor Park as United's new coach for the 2000–01 season; however, he only lasted until February 2001 when captain Velimir Kupresak took over as coach. Croatia 1998 World Cup midfielder Alojsa Asanovic came out for a two-game stint with United, scoring a goal against the Auckland Kingz. United finished tenth, after winning their first three games of the season.

Branko Culina came back for a second stint as coach for the 2001–02 season, finishing 11th. For the 2002–2003 season, the club imported three Croatian players: goalkeeper Vanja Ivesa and defenders Bozidar Cacic and Boris Pavić. However, the club finished 10th and Culina was replaced in January by former United striker Tony Krslovic.

Ex-Olympic defender Grant Lee was appointed coach in the 2003–04 season, when the club again finished 10th. Highlight of the year was the last away game with United's sister club, the Melbourne Knights. In front of an 8,423-strong crowd, the game on 29 February 2004 (which ended 0–0) saw flares, celebrations and a mass pitch invasion; this would be the final NSL game.

=== State league ===
With the demise of the NSL, the club once again played in the New South Wales Premier League. With new coach Zlatko Arambasic at the helm in 2005 United started off well, only to finish fourth. However, United enjoyed success with a 3–1 victory over the Belconnen Blue Devils in the Continental Tyres Cup Final at Parramatta Stadium in front of 1,500 fans.

In 2006 Arambasic was dismissed as coach, replaced by Jean-Paul de Marigny. United started slowly, but finished third. During the top-four Vodafone NSW Premier League final series, United defeated Blacktown City Demons 4–0 in the 2006 Grand Final; Luka Glavas scored all four goals. Jean-Paul de Marigny left the club in 2007 to pursue a coaching job with FootballNSW, and United appointed Bankstown City Lions assistant coach Peter Papoythis as head coach. On 8 May United, in eighth place, dismissed Papoythis; this saw another ex-United player, Ante Rumora, appointed coach. United finished the season in sixth place, four points from the top four.

In 2009, Sydney United finished top of the New South Wales Premier League, seven points clear of the Marconi Stallions. United had a disappointing finals series, though, losing to both Sutherland Sharks and Marconi and therefore failing to qualify for the grand final.

=== Recent era ===
In 2013, Sydney United took out the league title once more, but failed to make the grand final courtesy of two penalty shoot-out defeats to Bonnyrigg White Eagles and Rockdale City Suns. Despite this, their league title meant they qualified for the 2013 National Premier Leagues finals series. United beat Canberra FC 2–1 in the quarter finals, Olympic FC 4–3 in the semi-finals and South Hobart FC 2–0 in the final to take out the inaugural National Premier Leagues Championship.

Sydney United qualified for the inaugural FFA Cup in 2014. United drew Far North Queensland FC in the Round of 32 and progressed after a 4–1 win. They then faced A-League powerhouse Sydney FC in front of over 8,000 people at the Sydney United Sports Centre, eventually going down 3–1 to the fully professional outfit.

Sydney United qualified for the 2015 FFA Cup the following season. United drew South Hobart FC, whom they beat in 2013 to claim the NPL championship. United came back from 2–0 down to draw 3–3 and then take it on penalties. In the Round of 16, United faced Heidelberg United FC but lost 2–0 in front of 2,200 at Olympic Village in Melbourne.

For the 2016 season, United signed the likes of former Melbourne Knights captain Tomislav Uskok, who joined the club after a brief spell in the A-League with Central Coast Mariners, former Sydney United NSL player Eddy Bosnar and Manly United marksman Chris Payne, among others. After losing to Blacktown City in Round 1 of the NSW NPL, United went on to win their next eight games, including a 2–1 derby win over Bonnyrigg to move into top spot on the ladder. On 10 July 2016, United claimed the Waratah Cup for the second consecutive year, with a solitary strike from Japanese import Yutaro Shin guiding the side to a 1–0 victory over Manly. In the 2016 FFA Cup Round of 32, United were drawn against fellow NPL NSW side Blacktown City FC with the match to be played at Gabbie Stadium on 27 July 2016. Chris Payne and Robert Mileski gave 58 a two-goal lead, but City responded with two of its own to take the match to extra time. Blacktown's Danny Choi then scored a goal from inside his own half to give the home side the lead, with Blacktown going on to score another three goals in extra time to win the game 6–2, despite Riku Sasaki receiving his marching orders in the first half of extra time. On 31 July 2016, United grabbed its second piece of silverware for the season, winning the 2016 NPL NSW Premiership with two rounds to spare, with a 4–1 win over fierce rivals Bonnyrigg at Valentine Sports Park. United grabbed a third major title for the 2016 season when it was crowned 2016 National Premier Leagues Champions after defeating Northern NSW's Edgeworth FC Eagles 4–1 in an entertaining clash with Glen Trifiro bagging a hat-trick at Sydney United Sports Centre. With the victory, Sydney United became the first club to win the title two times, winning it in its inaugural season in 2013. After the triump, Mark Rudan stepped down from his role as senior head coach, having accumulated a number of successes in his four-year spell as manager of the club, including two NPL Finals Series Championships, two NPL NSW Premierships, two NSW Waratah Cups and four FFA Cup qualifications.

Sydney United appointed Davor Bajsić to lead the side in 2017, but resigned from the role after his side lost its opening three games of the NPL NSW season. United brought Mark Rudan back to the club to lead the senior side. On 16 August 2017, Sydney United appointed Jason Culina as head coach after Rudan stepped down.

==== 2022 Australia Cup ====
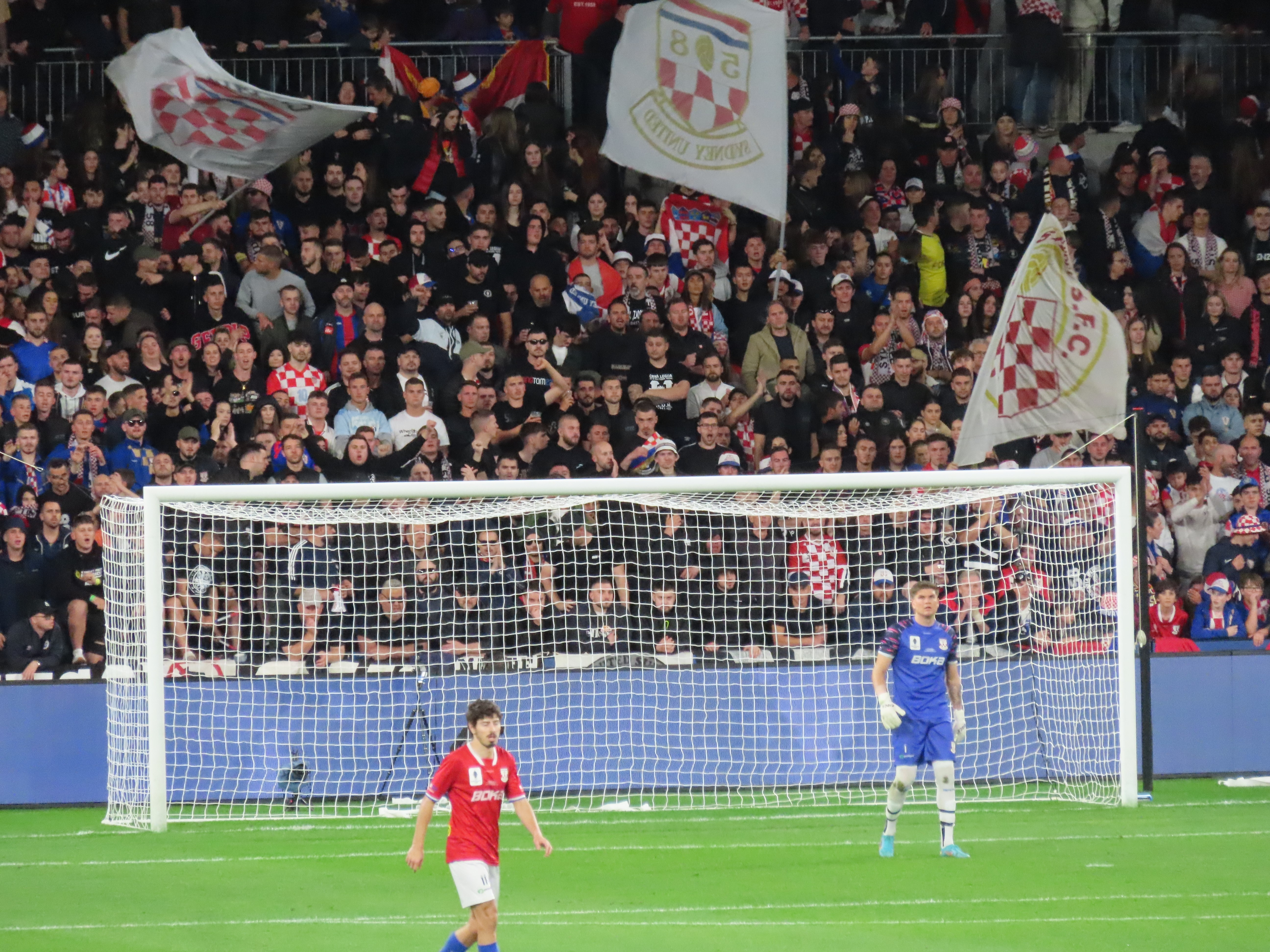
Sydney United 58 FC fans at the 2022 Australia Cup Final

In 2022, Sydney United became the first NPL club to qualify for the Australia Cup final. Their road to the final included beating the 2021–22 A-League Men champions Western United on penalties in the round of 16 and three-time A-League champions Brisbane Roar in the semi-final 3–2 after extra time. Sydney United lost 2-0 to Macarthur FC in the final, with Macarthur winning their first ever domestic trophy.

During the final, some Sydney United fans sung Za dom spremni (a fascist chant used by the Ustaše in Australia honouring the fascist and genocidal Ustaše movement founded by Ante Pavelić), booed the Welcome to Country, performed salutes commentators characterised as Nazi salutes, and waved flags associated with the extreme far-right Ustaša movement such as the HOS flag and the flag of the WW2 Nazi puppet-state of the NDH.

Following a month-long investigation, Football Australia sanctioned Sydney United 58 FC under breach of the National Code of Conduct and Ethics. The club was fined AUD$15,000, and received a number of suspended sanctions (including the possibility of further fines, point deductions in their National Premier Leagues NSW seasons, and a ban from the Australia Cup).

In June 2024, three Sydney United fans were convicted and fined $500 in a NSW court for deliberately and intentionally performing the Nazi salute at the 2022 Australia Cup Final.

==== NSD era from 2025 ====
Sydney United 58 announcement officially play in Australian Championship from October 2025 after submitting in Australian Professional League and club founder from eight teams on 20 November 2023. They will continue to play in the NPL NSW for the 2024 and 2025 season, before transitioning to the new league following season.

== Home ground ==
In 1981 Sydney United FC moved from the city to the United Sports Centre in Edensor Park (known to fans as "King Tom"), which has a capacity of 12,000. The main stand is known as the Boka stand (Boka was the main sponsor of the project). In the Boka stand is the Senator's Club, for lifetime members of the club. Inside the Senator's Club is the Kalac Bar, in recognition of Željko Kalac's transfer to Leicester City in the English Premier League (which helped pay for the Boka stand).

The club recently installed a new artificial grass field which was certified FIFA 2star standard. This "system" was installed by overseas contractors and overseen by the club as a virtually unique self installed field which saved many dollars.

Previous home grounds include:

- Wentworth Park, Glebe
- ES Marks Athletics Field
- Sydney Sports Ground, Moore Park
- Parramatta Stadium (1997–98 season)

== Rivalries ==
=== Bonnyrigg White Eagles ===
Sydney United has a fierce rivalry with the Serbian-backed Bonnyrigg White Eagles. The teams often met in the late 1970s with then Sydney Croatia dominating majority of the encounters against Bonnyrigg, who were then called Avala. After the demise of the National Soccer League, the two clubs would not meet again in a league competition until 2005. The games were often met with crowd violence, most notably in 2005.

=== Marconi Stallions ===
A short distance (1 km) north of Edensor Park in the neighbouring suburb of Bossley Park is the Marconi-Fairfield club. The Italian-backed club has been a rival of United's since 1970, when Marconi was promoted to the NSW State League. The clubs have had some close games: a 1988 Grand Final between the clubs saw the game go onto a penalty shoot-out (which Marconi won), and a semifinal game during the 1997–1998 season saw United's Kupresak sent off for headbutting Marconi's Sean Babic in the nose.

=== Northern Spirit/Parramatta Power ===
Both Northern Spirit and Parramatta Power were clubs admitted into the NSL to promote non-ethnic clubs. Northern Spirit (based in North Sydney) became a United rival when it signed former United players Graham Arnold, Robbie Slater, Kresimir Marusic, Paul Bilokapic and Mark Rudan. United, underdogs during the 2000–2001 with a depleted team, won 2–1 at North Sydney in wet conditions. Parramatta Power, backed by the Parramatta Eels Rugby League Club, entered competition during the 1999–2000 season after luring 16 United players and staff. United, however, defeated Parramatta 1–0 to end their aspirations for a finals berth.

=== Sydney Olympic ===
"Nomads" of the NSL and backed by a heavy Greek following, the club formerly known as Pan Hellenic have had a rich history with United since 1963 when they first met at Lambert Park. Both clubs have seen more activity off the field than on, especially with transfers of players between the clubs. Players such as Ante Milicic, Ned Zelic, Emil Dragicevic, Labinot Haliti, Jim Patikas, Graham Jennings, Ante Moric, Eric Hristodoulou, Ante Juric and Petar Markovic have switched between the clubs over the years.

== Players ==
=== 1st Grade Squad ===
As of 15 October 2026

Note: Flags indicate national team as defined under FIFA eligibility rules; some limited exceptions apply. Players may hold more than one non-FIFA nationality.

No.	Pos.	Nation	Player
1	GK	AUS	Adam Pavlesic
2	DF	AUS	Julian Cop
3	DF	AUS	Bailey Rule
4	DF	AUS	Adrian Vlastelica (captain)
5	MF	AUS	Anthony Tomelic
6	MF	AUS	Trypp Mclachlan (on loan from Macarthur FC)
7	FW	FIJ	Leroy Jennings
8	MF	JPN	Tomoki Wada
9	FW	AUS	William Kounnas
10	MF	AUS	Carlos De Oliveira
11	MF	SSD	Farah Koko
12	FW	AUS	Ali El-Sabeh (on loan from Macarthur FC)
13	DF	AUS	Jordan Ivancic
14	DF	AUS	Liam McGing
15	MF	AUS	Julian Cop

No.	Pos.	Nation	Player
16	MF	AUS	Anthony Krilic
17	DF	AUS	Michael Glassock
18	MF	AUS	Tomislav Ozanic
19	FW	AUS	Michael Krslovic
20	GK	AUS	Ethan Troselj
21	DF	JPN	Koya Nakano
22	FW	AUS	Nick Pratezina
23	MF	AUS	Mason Wells
24	MF	AUS	Christian Lardieri
25	MF	AUS	Matthew Yoo
—	MF	AUS	Gabriel Tilo
—	DF	AUS	Dylan Rose
—	FW	AUS	Kyle Cimenti

== Honours ==
National

- National Soccer League premiers (3): 1986 (Northern Division), 1996–97, 1998–99
- National Soccer League Grand Final runners-up (3): 1988, 1996–97, 1998–99
- National Soccer League finalists (9): 1985, 1986, 1988, 1993–94, 1994–95, 1995–96, 1996–97, 1997–98, 1998–99
- NSL Cup winners: 1987
- NSL Cup runners-up: 1994
- Australia Cup runners-up: 2022
- National Soccer League Regular Season runners-up (2): 1985 (Northern Conference), 1988

State

- National Premier Leagues champions (2): 2013, 2016
- National Premier Leagues NSW champions (6): 1977, 1982, 1983, 2006, 2020, 2026
- National Premier Leagues NSW runners-up (5): 1978, 1981, 2011, 2016, 2019
- National Premier Leagues NSW premiers (8): 1977, 1978, 1979, 1981, 1982, 2009, 2013, 2016
- National Premier Leagues NSW regular season runners-up (3): 1983, 2011, 2026
- Rothmans Cup/Waratah Cup winners (9): 1974, 1995, 1996, 2005, 2015, 2016, 2023, 2025, 2026
- Rothmans Cup/Waratah Cup runners-up (4): 1971, 1976, 2019, 2022
- National Premier Leagues NSW finalists (22): 1967, 1970, 1977, 1978, 1979, 1981, 1982, 1983, 2005, 2006, 2008, 2009, 2010, 2011, 2013, 2016, 2018, 2019, 2020, 2024, 2025, 2026
- NSW Division 1 champions: 1962
- NSW Division 2 champions: 1960
- Continental Cup winners: 2005
- Ampol Cup winners (2): 1986, 1987

Youth

- National Youth League champions (2): 1991–92, 1994–95
- National Youth League runners-up (2): 1993–1994, 1996–97
- National Youth League (Northern Division) champions (4): 1991–92, 1993–94, 1994–95, 1996–97

Other

- Australian-Croatian Soccer Tournament winners (12): 1976, 1978, 1979, 1981, 1987, 1988, 1989, 1996, 2006, 2023, 2024, 2026

== Notable international players ==
Australia

- Attila Abonyi
- Zlatko Arambasic
- Walter Ardone
- Graham Arnold
- Francis Awaritefe
- Mark Babic
- Zeljko Babic
- Paul Bilokapic
- Mark Bosnich
- Ken Boden
- Jacob Burns
- Tim Cahill
- Pablo Cardozo
- Paul Carter
- Jason Culina
- Ron Corry
- John Doyle
- Robert Enes
- Craig Foster
- Tony Franken
- Aytek Genc

- Mike Gibson
- Ron Giles
- Mike Grbevski
- Adam Griffiths
- Joel Griffiths
- Troy Halpin
- Robert Hooker
- Alan Hunter
- Mile Jedinak
- Graham Jennings
- Ante Juric
- Zeljko Kalac
- Eddie Krncevic
- Tony Krslovic
- Gabriel Mendez
- Ante Milicic
- David Mitchell
- Ante Moric
- Zarko Odzakov
- Jim Patikas
- Tom Pondeljak
- Tony Popovic

- Ray Richards
- Bobby Russell
- John Russell
- Abbas Saad
- Wally Savor
- Nigel Shepherd
- Hilton Silva
- Robbie Slater
- Mile Sterjovski
- Peter Stone
- Max Tolson
- Brian Turner
- Robert Trajkovski
- Billy Vojtek
- Cristian Volpato
- Alan Westwater
- Greg Woodhouse
- Brett Woods
- Dennis Yaager
- Patrick Yazbek
- Ned Zelic
- David Zdrilic

Afghanistan

- Naeem Rahimi

Croatia

- Aljosa Asanovic
- Anthony Šerić

Fiji

- Leroy Jennings

Lebanon

- Jackson Khoury

Mauritius

- Stephan de Robillard

New Zealand

- Clive Campbell
- Andrew Durante
- Tommy Randles
- David Taylor

Papua New Guinea

- Manis Lamond

Samoa

- Joel Bartley

Scotland

- Stuart Munro

Solomon Islands

- Commins Menapi

== Club records ==
- Best result: W 12–0 vs. Henwood Park (H) 2 May 2018 (FFA Cup round 5)
- Worst result: L 0–6 v Sydney Olympic (A) 2 March 2024
- Best crowd: 16,614 v Marconi 23 February 1997
- Most games (coached): Branko Culina (133 games, W62-D32-L39)
- Most games (played): 450 (Petar Markovic, 2001–2013 to 2017–2019)
- Most goals scored: 85, Luka Glavas
- Most goals in a season (individual): 21, David Zdrillic (1996–1997)
- Best games-to-goals ratio in a season: 0.58, David Seal (18 goals in 31 games)
- Youngest player: 16 years, 90 days (Jason Culina, 3 November 1996)

== See also ==
- List of Sydney United 58 FC seasons
- Sydney United 58 FC at the 2022 Australia Cup
- Melbourne Knights (sister club to Sydney United)
- Australian-Croatian Soccer Tournament
- List of Croatian soccer clubs in Australia
