= 2011 NSW Premier League season =

NSW Premier League 2011
- League: NSW Premier League
- Sport: Association football
- Duration: Autumn/Winter 2011
- Teams: 12

2011
- Champions: Sydney Olympic
- Premiers: Sydney Olympic
- Top scorer: Luka Glavaš, Sydney United (13)

2011 Waratah Cup
- Champions: Manly United

NSW Premier League seasons
- ← 2010 2012 →

The 2011 NSW Premier League season was the 11th season of the revamped NSW Premier League.

== Teams ==
West Sydney Berries were relegated at the end of the 2010 season after finishing at the bottom of the table. They were replaced by Super League champions Parramatta Eagles.

Club	Ground	Capacity
APIA Tigers	Lambert Park	7,000
Bankstown City Lions FC	Jensen Oval	5,000
Blacktown City Demons FC	Lily Homes Stadium	7,500
Bonnyrigg White Eagles FC	Bonnyrigg Sports Club	5,000
Manly United FC	Cromer Park	5,000
Marconi Stallions FC	Marconi Stadium	11,500
Rockdale City Suns FC	Bicentennial Park South	5,000
South Coast Wolves FC	WIN Stadium; John Crehan Park*	20,000; 7,500
Sutherland Sharks FC	Seymour Shaw Park	5,000
Sydney Olympic FC	Belmore Sports Ground; Lambert Park**	25,000; 7,000
Sydney United FC	Sydney United Sports Centre	12,000
Parramatta Eagles	Melita Stadium	10,000

- South Coast Wolves home ground of WIN Stadium is under renovation, and will use John Crehan Park until it is finished.
  - Sydney Olympics home ground of Belmore Oval is under renovation, and will use Lambert Park until it is finished.

== League table ==
Pos	Team	Pld	W	D	L	GF	GA	GD	Pts	Qualification or relegation
1	Sydney Olympic (C)	22	13	4	5	40	26	+14	43	2011 NSW Premier League Champions
2	Sydney United	22	11	6	5	38	23	+15	39	Qualified for the 2011 NSW Premier League Finals
3	Sutherland Sharks	22	11	5	6	31	28	+3	38	Qualified for the 2011 NSW Premier League Finals
4	Blacktown City	22	11	4	7	35	22	+13	37	Qualified for the 2011 NSW Premier League Finals
5	Bonnyrigg White Eagles	22	8	9	5	33	24	+9	33	Qualified for the 2011 NSW Premier League Finals
6	Manly United	22	8	7	7	33	37	−4	31	
7	South Coast Wolves	22	9	3	10	35	36	−1	30	
8	Rockdale City Suns	22	8	4	10	23	29	−6	28	
9	Marconi Stallions	22	6	8	8	28	25	+3	26	
10	APIA Leichhardt Tigers	22	6	5	11	24	36	−12	23	
11	Bankstown City (R)	22	6	3	13	30	47	−17	21	Relegated to the 2012 NSW Super League
12	Parramatta FC	22	4	4	14	19	36	−17	16	

Source: http://www.socceraust.co.uk/2011/NSW/PL/fixtures.html
Rules for classification: 1) points; 2) goal difference; 3) number of goals scored.
(C) Champions; (R) Relegated

== Fixtures ==
Week 1

26 March 2011	Sutherland	2–1	Blacktown City	Seymour Shaw Park
Saturday 19:00 EST	Bailey 30'; Halloran 76'	Report - Football NSW Article	Major 63' (pen.)	Attendance: 500 approx. Referee: Matthew Cheeseman

27 March 2011	Rockdale	1–1	APIA	Bicentennial Park South
Sunday 16:00 EST	Kir 50'	Report - Football NSW Article	Parisi 61'	Attendance: Unknown; Referee: Kurt Ams

27 March 2011	Parramatta	2–2	Bonnyrigg	Melita Stadium
Sunday 16:00 EST	Iacovelli 18', 35'	Report - Football NSW Article	Boardman 32'; Elasi 90+3'	Attendance: 805 approx. Referee: James Lewis

27 March 2011	South Coast	0–3	Sydney Olympic	John Crehan Park
Sunday 16:00 EST	Kaynak (yellow card) 16' (yellow-red card) 22'	Report - Football NSW Article	Smith 46', 80', 90'; Gullo (yellow card) 16' (yellow-red card) 69'	Attendance: 200 approx. Referee: Alex Glasgow

27 March 2011	Sydney United	2–2	Manly United	Sydney United Sports Centre
Sunday 16:00 EST	Glavaš 34'; Barkhousir 36'	Report - Football NSW Article	Adam Foti 15'; Cattanach 90+2' (pen.); Forbes (red card) 77'	Attendance: 500 approx. Referee: Khodr Yaghi

27 March 2011	Bankstown City	1–3	Marconi	Jensen Oval
Sunday 16:00 EST	Ristevski 38' (red card) 76'	Report - Football NSW Article	Nunes 42'; Arrarte 56'; Sama 90'	Attendance: 450; Referee: Kris Griffiths-Jones

Week 2

2 April 2011	Bonnyrigg	1–1	APIA	Bonnyrigg Sports Club
Saturday, 7:00pm EST	Boardman 20'	Report - Football NSW Article	Younis 70' (pen.)	Attendance: 500 approx. Referee: Kris Griffith-Jones

2 April 2011	Rockdale	0–1	Bankstown City	Bicentennial Park South
Saturday, 7:00pm EST		Report - Football NSW Article	Burgin 48'	Attendance: 1,200 approx. Referee: Khodr Yaghi

2 April 2011	Marconi	0–1	Sydney United	Marconi Stadium
Saturday, 7:30pm EST		Report - Football NSW Article	Tomic 5'	Attendance: 600 approx. Referee: James Lewis

3 April 2011	Manly United	2–2	Sutherland	Cromer Park
Sunday, 3:00pm EST	Foti 42', 86'	Report - Football NSW Article	Nikas 48'; Bailey 68'; Kohler (red card) 42'	Attendance: 300 approx. Referee: Kevin Peddie

3 April 2011	Blacktown City	0–1	Sydney Olympic	Lily Homes Stadium
Sunday, 3:00pm EST	Long (red card) 77'	Report - Football NSW Article	Smith 61'; Kalouris (red card) 64'	Attendance: 350 approx. Referee: Andrew Best

3 April 2011	South Coast	2–1	Parramatta	John Crehan Park
Sunday, 4:00pm EST	Petrovski 75'; Paric 81'	Report - Football NSW Article	Camilleri 27'	Attendance: 300 approx. Referee: Kurts Ams

Week 3

9 April 2011	Bankstown City	0–0	Bonnyrigg	Jensen Oval
Saturday, 7:00pm EST	Peralta (yellow card) 84' (yellow-red card) 85'	Report - Football NSW Article	Boardman (yellow card) 72' (yellow-red card) 90'	Attendance: 500; Referee: Andrew Best

9 April 2011	Sutherland	2–1	Sydney Olympic	Seymour Shaw Park
Saturday, 7:00pm EST	Bailey 56'; Awad 73'	Report - Football NSW Article	Smith 85'	Attendance: 300; Referee: Strebre Delovski

9 April 2011	Marconi	2–2	Manly United	Marconi Stadium
Saturday, 7:30pm EST	Mayora 57', 67'	Report - Football NSW Article	Hayward 77', 82'	Attendance: 300; Referee: Kurt Ams

10 April 2011	APIA	2–3	South Coast	Lambert Park
Sunday, 3:00pm EST	James 85' (pen.); Hartshorn 90+2'	Report - Football NSW Article	Petrovski 22'; Nathaniel 41'; Littler 85'	Referee: James Lewis

10 April 2011	Parramatta	1–1	Blacktown City	Melita Stadium
Sunday, 7:00pm EST	Camilleri 78' (pen.)	Report - Football NSW Article	Duke 71'	Attendance: 400; Referee: Kris Griffiths-Jones

10 April 2011	Sydney United	6–1	Rockdale	Sydney United Sports Centre
Sunday, 7:00pm EST	Vidaic 14'; Barkhousir 30', 31', 88'; Hayes 56'; Glavas 90'	Report - Football NSW Article	Tirovski 38'	Attendance: 400 approx. Referee: Alex Glasgow

Week 4

5 May 2011	Bonnyrigg	1–2	Sydney United	Lily Homes Stadium
Thursday, 7:30pm EST	Boardman 41'	Report - Football NSW Article	Glavas 15'; Tomi? 43'	Referee: Strebre Delovski

16 April 2011	Sutherland	1–0	Parramatta	Seymour Shaw Park
Saturday, 7:00pm EST	Bailey 48'	Report - Football NSW Article		Referee: James Lewis

4 May 2011	Rockdale	1–0	Marconi Stallions	Bicentennial Park South
Wednesday, 8:15pm EST	Kir 4'	Report - Football NSW Article		Referee: Andrew Best

17 April 2011	Blacktown	1–2	APIA	Lily Homes Stadium
Sunday, 3:00pm EST	Simonovic 43'; Simpson (red card) 58'	Report - Football NSW Article	Kayes 24'; Rizzo 90+2'	Attendance: 300 approx. Referee: Kurt Ams

17 April 2011	South Coast	1–2	Bankstown	John Crehan Park
Sunday, 3:00pm EST	Petrovski 55'; Paric (red card) 9'	Report - Football NSW Article	Hadid 27', 86'	Attendance: 400 Approx. Referee: Adam Weir

17 April 2011	Manly United	1–1	Sydney Olympic	Cromer Park
Sunday, 3:00pm EST	Sim 22'	Report - Football NSW Article	Luksic 65'	Referee: Khodr Yaghi

† Bonnyrigg v Sydney United (originally scheduled for Saturday, 16 April) was washed out due to heavy rain and postponed to a later date.

† Rockdale v Marconi (originally scheduled for Saturday, 16 April) was washed out due to heavy rain and postponed to Wednesday 4 May.

Week 5

22 April 2011	APIA	1–1	Sutherland	Lambert Park
Friday 3:00pm EST	Hartshorn 9'	Report - Football NSW Article	Price 29'	Attendance: approx. 300; Referee: Alex Glasgow

23 April 2011	Bankstown	1–3	Blacktown	Jensen Oval
7:00pm EST	Hadid 24'	Report - Football NSW Article	Major 31', 52'; Long 45'	Attendance: 300; Referee: Adam Weir

23 April 2011	Manly United	0–1	Rockdale	Cromer Park
Saturday, 7:00pm EST		Report - Football NSW Article	Tirovski 67' (pen.)	Attendance: 300; Referee: Steve Lucas

24 April 2011	Parramatta	0–1	Sydney Olympic	Melita Stadium
Monday 3:00pmEST		Report - Football NSW Article	Smith 8'	Attendance: 300 approx. Referee: Alex Glasgow

24 April 2011	Sydney United	2–0	South Coast	Sydney United Sports Centre
Monday, 4:00pm EST	Glavas 7'; Vidaic 22'	Report - Football NSW Article		Referee: Adam Susz

25 April 2011	Marconi	0–0	Bonnyrigg	Marconi Stadium
Monday, 3:00pm EST	Mayora (red card) 40'	Report - Football NSW Article		Attendance: 1,000 approx Referee: Khodr Yaghi

Week 6

30 April 2011	Bonnyrigg	2–1	Rockdale	Bonnyrigg Sports Club
Saturday, 7:00pm EST	Elasi 27'; Diaz 87'; Zonjic (red card) 66'; Webb (red card) 90+3'	Report - Football NSW Article	Robinson 18' (o.g.)	Attendance: 600 approx. Referee: –

30 April 2011	Sutherland	2–1	Bankstown	Seymour Shaw Park
Saturday, 7:00pm EST	Awad 53'; Bailey 65'	Report - Football NSW Article	Gardiner 63'	Referee: Kurt Ahms

1 May 2011	South Coast	0–1	Marconi	John Crehan Park
Sunday, 3:00pm EST		Report - Football NSW Article	Shelvin 22'	Attendance: 200 approx. Referee: Alex Glasgow

1 May 2011	APIA	1–4	Sydney Olympic	Lambert Park
Saturday, 3:00pm EST	James 52'	Report - Football NSW Article	Mileski 13'; Smith 34', 59'; Makrys 53'	Referee: Kris Griffith Jones

1 May 2011	Blacktown	2–1	Sydney United	Lilly Homes Stadium
Sunday, 3:00pm EST	Simonovic 26'; Cairncross 37'	Report - Football NSW Article	Glavas 28' (pen.)	Attendance: 600 approx. Referee: Khodr Yaghi

18 May 2011	Parramatta	5–1	Manly United	Melita Stadium
Wednesday, 8:15pm EST

† Parramatta v Manly (originally scheduled for Sunday, 1 May) was washed out due to heavy rain. and postponed to Wednesday 18 May

Week 7

7 May 2011	Bankstown	2–5	Sydney Olympic	Jensen Oval
Saturday 5:00pm EST	Hadid 14'; Dejanovic 45+2'	Report - Football NSW Article	Mileski 18', 90+2'; Triantis 35'; Luksic 50'; Kalouris 57'	Attendance: 550; Referee: Ryan Shepheard

7 May 2011	APIA	2–0	Parramatta	Lambert Park
Saturday 5:00pm EST	Robbie Younis 8'; D'Apuzzo 55'	Report - Football NSW Article		Referee: Alex Glasgow

8 May 2011	Rockdale	0–1	South Coast	Bicentennial Park South
Sunday 3:00pm EST		Report - Football NSW Article	Piccolini 42'	Referee: Kurt Ams

8 May 2011	Marconi	1–1	Blacktown	Marconi Stadium
Sunday 3:00pm EST	El Jamal 85'	Report - Football NSW Article	Major 71' (pen.); Cairncross (red card) 71'	Attendance: 300 approx. Referee: Kevin Peddie

8 May 2011	Manly United	3–2	Bonnyrigg	Cromer Park
Sunday 3:00pm EST	Balderson 34', 36'; Foti 71'; Dodd (red card) 75'	Report - Football NSW Article	Elasi 8'; McMaster 55'	Referee: Khodr Yaghi

8 May 2011	Sydney United	0–0	Sutherland	Sydney United Sports Centre
Sunday 4:00pm EST		Report - Football NSW Article		Attendance: 400 approx. Referee: James Lewis

Week 8

14 May 2011	Sutherland	2–1	Marconi	Seymour Shaw Park
Saturday, 5:00pm EST	Tsattalios 55'; Awad 58'	Report - Football NSW Article	Trimboli 42'	Referee: Ryan Shepherd

14 May 2011	Bonyrigg	3–1	South Coast	Bonnyrigg Sports Club
Saturday, 5:00pm EST	Severino 32', 55'; Vrankovic 49'	Report - Football NSW Article	Picciolini 52'	Attendance: 800 approx. Referee: Ryan Shepherd

14 May 2011	Parramatta Eagles	0–3	Bankstown	Melita Stadium
Saturday, 5:00pm EST		Report - Football NSW Article	Graham 18', 69', 86'	Referee: Andrew Best

15 May 2011	Blacktown City Demons	0–1	Rockdale	Gabbie Stadium
Sunday, 3:00pm EST		Report - Football NSW Article	Spitz 67'	Attendance: 400 approx. Referee: Jason Blackwood

15 May 2011	APIA	1–2	Manly United	Lambert Park
Sunday, 3:00pm EST	Parisi 15'	Report - Football NSW Article	Foti 16'; Gibbs 37'

15 May 2011	Sydney United	2–3	Sydney Olympic	Sydney United Sports Centre
Sunday, 3:00pm EST	Glavas 13', 54'	Report - Football NSW Article	Giannaros 4'; Robbie Mileski 35'; Makrys 82'	Attendance: 800 approx. Referee: Kris Griffiths-Jones

Week 9

21 May 2011	Bankstown	0–2	APIA	Jensen Oval
Saturday, 5:00pm EST		Report - Football NSW Article	Younis 30'; Parisi 60'	Attendance: 350 approx. Referee: Khodr Yaghi

21 May 2011	Rockdale	1–1	Sutherland Sharks	Bicentennial Park South
Saturday, 5:00pm EST	Apolevski 45' (pen.)	Report - Football NSW Article	Jasli 88'	Referee: Alex Glasgow

22 May 2011	Blacktown	2–0	Bonnyrigg	Gabbie Stadium
Sunday, 3:00pm EST	Roodenburg 60'; Major 90+3' (pen.)	Report - Football NSW Article		Attendance: 350 approx. Referee: James Lewis

22 May 2011	Marconi	0–0	Sydney Olympic	Marconi Stadium
Sunday, 3:00pm EST		Report - Football NSW Article		Referee: Gerard Parsons

22 May 2011	Manly United	2–2	South Coast	Cromer Park
Sunday, 3:00pm EST	Iley 27'; Hayward 54'	Report - Football NSW Article	Martinoski 84'; Piccolini 86'	Attendance: 300 approx. Referee: Adam Weir

22 May 2011	Sydney United	1–0	Parramatta Eagles	Sydney United Sports Centre
Sunday, 4:00pm EST	Cindric 51'	Report - Football NSW Article		Attendance: 400 approx. Referee: Kurt Ams

Week 10

28 May 2011	Sutherland	2–4	Bonnyrigg	Seymour Shaw Park
7:00pm EST	Bailey 9'; Cahill 74'	Report - Football NSW Article	Elasi 39'; Lum 52' (pen.); Powell 54'; Boardman 59'	Referee: Kevin Peddie

29 May 2011	South Coast	1–2	Blacktown City	John Crehan Park
Sunday, 4:00pm EST	Martinoski 10'	Report - Football NSW Article	Abel 45' (o.g.); Duke 70'	Attendance: 300 approx. Referee: Gerard Parsons

29 May 2011	APIA	2–2	Sydney United	Lambert Park
Sunday, 4:00pm EST	Messam 17'; Byrnes 76'; Bello-Amigo (red card) 51'; Vass (red card) 80'	Report - Football NSW Article	Glavas 51' (pen.); West 63' (o.g.)	Referee: James Lewis

29 May 2011	Parramatta	1–4	Marconi	Melita Stadium
Sunday, 4:00pm EST	Petratos 84'	Report - Football NSW Article	Mayora 23', 40'; Gordon 72'; Sama 90+3'	Attendance: 200 Approx; Referee: Khodr Yaghi

29 May 2011	Rockdale	0–2	Sydney Olympic	Bicentennial Park South
Sunday, 4:00pm EST	Makrys 29' (pen.); Gullo 38'	Report - Football NSW Article		Attendance: 832; Referee: Kurt Ams

29 May 2011	Manly United	2–1	Bankstown	Cromer Park
Sunday, 4:00pm EST	Balderson 1'; Forbes 22'	Report - Football NSW Article	Gardiner 47'	Attendance: 350 approx. Referee: Jason Blackwood

Week 11

4 May 2011	Bonnyrigg	3–0	Sydney Olympic	Bonnyrigg Sports Club
Saturday, 7:30pm EST	McMaster 20'; Muryama 83'; Tadrosse 88'	Report - Football NSW Article	Mileski (red card) 80'	Attendance: 600 approx. Referee: Gerard Parsons

4 May 2011	Marconi	3–0	APIA	Marconi Stadium
Saturday, 7:30pm EST	Mailer 12'; Arrarte 51' (pen.); Gordon 60'	Report - Football NSW Article	A'Apuzzo (red card) 90+3'	Referee: Kris Griffith Jones

4 May 2011	South Coast	1–2	Sutherland	Seymour Shaw Park
Saturday, 7:30pm EST	Petrovski 61' (red card) 86'	Report - Football NSW Article	Price 19'; Bailey 52'	Attendance: 300 approx. Referee: Adam Susz

5 May 2011	Rockdale	4–1	Parramatta	Bicentennial Park South
Sunday, 4:00pm EST	Lawson 42'; Monie 47'; Naidovski 53', 66'	Report - Football NSW Article	Elrich 8'	Referee: Adam Weir

5 May 2011	Blacktown	0–3	Manly United	Cromer Park
Sunday, 4:30pm EST		Report - Football NSW Article	Simonovic 23'; Roodenburg 44'; Major 83'	Attendance: 300 approx. Referee: Andrew Best

5 May 2011	Sydney United	2–2	Bankstown	Cromer Park
Sunday, 4:30pm EST	Vidaic 74'; Hayes 83'	Report - Football NSW Article	Salameh 47'; Gardiner 85'	Attendance: 300 approx. Referee: Alex Glasgow

† Due to South Coast's home ground John Crehan Park being washed out due to inclement weather, an agreement between South Coast and Sutherland Sharks allowed the game to be played at Sutherland's home ground of Seymour Shaw Park, with South Coast being allotted the home team.

Week 12

11 June 2011	Bonnyrigg	1–0	Parramatta	Bonnyrigg Sports Club
7:30pm EST	Powell 90+1'; Lum (red card) 19'	Report - Football NSW Article		Attendance: 600 approx. Referee: Kurt Ams

11 June 2011	Marconi	1–0	Bankstown	Marconi Stadium
7:30pm EST	Petkovski 38'	Report - Football NSW Article		Referee: Ryan Shepheard

12 June 2011	Blacktown	1–0	Sutherland	Gabbie Stadium
3:00pm EST	Morten 76' (o.g.)	Report - Football NSW Article		Attendance: 200 approx. Referee: Alex Glasgow

12 June 2011	Sydney Olympic	2–1	South Coast	Belmore Oval
EST	Makrys 3' (pen.); Bamber 60'	Report - Football NSW Article	Picciolini 24'	Attendance: 400 approx. Referee: James Lewis

9 July 2011	APIA	0–3	Rockdale	Lambert Park
Saturday, 3:00pm EST	Naidovski 3'; Spitz 43'; Tirovski 87'	Report - Football NSW Article		Referee: Kevin Peddie

27 July 2011	Manly United	1–3	Sydney United	Cromer Park
Wednesday, 8:15pm EST		Report - Football NSW Article

† APIA Leichhardt Tigers v Rockdale City Suns, along with Manly United v Sydney United matches, both scheduled for Sunday, 12 June 2011 were postponed due to inclement weather. The APIA v Rockdale game, was rescheduled for 9 July 2011. The Manly v Sydney United game was played on Wednesday, 27 July 2011.

Week 13

3 August 2011	Parramatta	1–2	South Coast	Melita Stadium
Wednesday, 8:15pm EST		Report - Football NSW Article

18 June 2011	Sutherland	3–1	Manly	Seymour Shaw Park
Saturday, 7:30pmEST	Bailey 50', 57'; Tsattalios 64'	Report - Football NSW Article	Balderson 70'	Referee: Gerard Parsons

19 June 2011	APIA	0–1	Bonnyrigg	Lambert Park
Sunday, 3:00pm EST		Report - Football NSW Article	Canak 56'	Referee: James Lewis

19 June 2011	Banktown	1–0	Rockdale	Jensen Oval
3:00pm EST	Graham 86'	Report - Football NSW Article	Apolevski (red card) 64'	Referee: Andrew Best

19 June 2011	Sydney Olympic	1–0	Blacktown	Belmore Oval
3:00pm EST	Triantis 4'	Report - Football NSW Article		Attendance: 815; Referee: Kris Griffiths-Jones

19 June 2011	Sydney United	1–0	Marconi	Sydney United Sports Centre
4:00 EST	Glavas 45'	Report - Football NSW Article		Referee: Khodr Yaghi

†Parramatta Eagles v South Coast, scheduled for Saturday, 18 June, was postponed due to inclement weather. The game was rescheduled for Wednesday, 3 August.

Week 14

Saturday, 25 June 2011	Sydney Olympic	2–1	Sutherland	Belmore Oval
5.30pm EST	Studman 76'; Mileski 90+2'	Report - Football NSW Article	Tsattalios 80'	Referee: Khodr Yaghi

Saturday, 25 June 2011	Bonnyrigg	1–1	Bankstown	Bonnyrigg Sports Club
7:00pm EST	Boardman 71'; McMaster (yellow card) 49' (yellow-red card) 57'	Report - Football NSW Article	Hadid 1'	Referee: Adam Weir

Saturday, 25 June 2011	Rockdale	1–2	Sydney United	Bicentennial Park South
7:30pm EST	Tirovski 55'	Report - Football NSW Article	Barkhousir 71'; Glavas 81'	Referee: Jason Blackwood

Sunday, 26 June 2011	South Coast	2–1	APIA	John Crehan Park
3:00pm EST	Picciolini 76'; Petrovski 90+1'	Report - Football NSW Article	Jajaw 11'	Referee: Kris Griffiths-Jones

Sunday, 26 June 2011	Blacktown	0–1	Parramatta	Gabbie Stadium
3:00pm EST	Cairncross (yellow card) 31' (yellow-red card) 75'	Report - Football NSW Article	Grima 48'	Referee: Nick Waldron

Sunday, 26 June 2011	Manly	3–1	Marconi	Cromer Park
4:00pm EST	Daly 35'; Hayward 81'; Balderson 89'	Report - Football NSW Article	Sama 6'	Referee: James Lewis

Week 15

2, July 2011	Parramatta	1–0	Sutherland	Melita Stadium
7:00pm EST	Fogarty 49'	Report - Football NSW Article		Referee: Andrew Best

3 July 2011	Sydney United	0–0	Bonnyrigg	Sydney United Sports Centre
Sunday, 1:00pm EST		Report - Football NSW Article

3 July 2011	Marconi	1–2	Rockdale	Marconi Stadium
3:00pm EST	Arrarte 26'	Report - Football NSW Article	Lawson 82'; Hudap 86'	Referee: Alex Glasgow

3 July 2011	Bankstown	4–3	South Coast Wolves	Jensen Oval
3:00pm EST	Dejanovic 3'; Graham 53'; Bedzo 57'; Mitchell 78'	Report - Football NSW Article	Petrovski 20'; Picciolini 29', 72'	Referee: James Lewis

3 July 2011	Sydney Olympic	1–2	Manly United	Belmore Oval
3:00pm EST	Mileski 67'	Report - Football NSW Article	Cattanach 24'; Simm 34'	Referee: Kevin Peddie

3 July 2011	APIA	2–3	Blacktown	Lambert Park
3:00pm EST	Younis 55'; Rizzo 67'	Report - Football NSW Article	Duke 8'; Simonovic 25', 31'	Referee: Khodr Yaghi

Week 16

16 July 2011	Sutherland	2–0	APIA	Seymour Shaw Park
Saturday 7:30pm EST	Bailey 15'; Nikas 17'	Report - Football NSW Article		Referee: Kurt Ams

16 July 2011	Bonnyrigg	3–1	Marconi	Bonnyrigg Sports Club
Saturday, 7:00pm EST	Boardman 64'; Gan 66'; Powell 88'	Report - Football NSW Article	Sama 35'	Referee: Ryan Shepheard

17 July 2011	Blacktown	7–1	Bankstown	Gabbie Stadium
Sunday, 3:00pm EST	Duke 4', 90'; Cairncross 7'; Roodenburg 38', 43', 50'; Major 83' (pen.)	Report - Football NSW Article	Salameh 75' (pen.)	Referee: Andrew Best

17 July 2011	Sydney Olympic	2–0	Parramatta	Belmore Oval
Sunday, 3pm EST	Mileski 1'} Gullo 78'	Report - Football NSW Article	Elrich 59'	Referee: James Lewis

17 July 2011	Rockdale	1–1	Manly	Bicentennial Park South
Sunday, 3pm EST	Naidovski 39'	Report - Football NSW Article	Foti 36'	Referee: Kevin Peddie

17 July 2011	South Coast	1–2	Sydney United	John Crehan Park
EST	Picciolini 29'	Report - Football NSW Article	Vidaic 44'; Barkhousir 55'	Referee: Strebre Delovski

Week 17

4 September 2011	Sydney Olympic	3–0	APIA	Belmore Sports Ground
Sunday 3:00pm EST

4 September 2011	Manly	2–0	Parramatta	Cromer Park
Sunday 3:00pm EST

4 September 2011	Rockdale	2–1	Bonnyrigg	Bicentennial Park South
Sunday 3:00pm EST

4 September 2011	Bankstown	2–3	Sutherland	Jensen Oval
Sunday 3:00pm EST

4 September 2011	Marconi	1–3	South Coast	Marconi Stadium
Sunday 3:00pm EST

4 September 2011	Sydney United	0–2	Blacktown	Sydney United Sports Centre
Sunday 3:00pm EST

† Round 17 was originally scheduled to be played on the weekend of 23/24 July 2011, but all matches were washed out due to the extreme weather conditions and rescheduled for 4 September 2011

Week 18

30 July 2011	Bonnyrigg	0–0	Manly	Bonnyrigg Sports Club
Saturday 19:00 EST

30 July 2011	Sutherland	1–0	Sydney United	Seymour Shaw Park
Saturday 19:00 EST

31 July 2011	Parramatta	2–0	APIA	Melita Stadium
Sunday 15:00 EST

31 July 2011	South Coast	4–1	Rockdale	John Crehan Park
Sunday 15:00 EST

31 July 2011	Sydney Olympic	3–0	Bankstown City	Belmore Sports Ground
Sunday 15:00 EST

31 July 2011	Blacktown	1–1	Marconi	Lily Homes Stadium
Sunday 15:00 EST

Week 19

6 August 2011	South Coast	2–2	Bonnyrigg	John Crehan Park
Saturday 19:00 EST

7 August 2011	Sydney Olympic	2–4	Sydney United	Belmore Sports Ground
Sunday 15:00 EST

7 August 2011	Manly	0–2	APIA	Cromer Park
Sunday 15:00 EST

7 August 2011	Rockdale	0–2	Blacktown	Bicentennial Park South
Sunday 15:00 EST

7 August 2011	Bankstown City	4–1	Parramatta	Jensen Oval
Sunday 15:00 EST

7 August 2011	Marconi	1–1	Sutherland	Marconi Stadium
Sunday 15:00 EST

Week 20

13 August 2011	Bonnyrigg	0–1	Blacktown	Bonnyrigg Sports Club
Saturday 19:00 EST

13 August 2011	Sutherland	1–0	Rockdale	Seymour Shaw Park
Saturday 19:00 EST

13 August 2011	Parramatta	1–1	Sydney United	Melita Stadium
Saturday 19:00 EST

14 August 2011	Sydney Olympic	1–5	Marconi	Belmore Sports Ground
Sunday 15:00 EST

14 August 2011	South Coast	4–1	Manly	John Crehan Park
Sunday 15:00 EST

14 August 2011	APIA	1–1	Bankstown City	Lambert Park
Sunday 15:00 EST

Week 21

20 August 2011	Bonnyrigg	5–2	Sutherland	Bonnyrigg Sports Club
Saturday 19:00 EST

21 August 2011	Sydney Olympic	1–1	Rockdale	Belmore Sports Ground
Sunday 15:00 EST

21 August 2011	Marconi	1–1	Parramatta	Marconi Stadium
Sunday 15:00 EST

21 August 2011	Bankstown City	0–1	Manly	Jensen Oval
Sunday 15:00 EST

21 August 2011	Blacktown	1–1	South Coast	Lily Homes Stadium
Sunday 15:00 EST

21 August 2011	Sydney United	0–1	APIA	Sydney United Sports Centre
Sunday 15:00 EST

Week 22

28 August 2011	Blacktown	2–4	Manly	Lily Homes Stadium
Sunday 15:00 EST

28 August 2011	Sutherland	0–2	South Coast	Seymour Shaw Park
Sunday 15:00 EST

28 August 2011	Parramatta	0–1	Rockdale	Melita Stadium
Sunday 15:00 EST

28 August 2011	Sydney Olympic	1–1	Bonnyrigg	Belmore Sports Ground
Sunday 15:00 EST

28 August 2011	Bankstown City	1–4	Sydney United	Jensen Oval
Sunday 15:00 EST

28 August 2011	APIA	0–0	Marconi	Lambert Park
Sunday 15:00 EST

== Finals ==
At the end of the regular season, the top 5 teams play off in a finals series to determine the champion for the season. The finals format used is the final five system used in other sports throughout Australia. This system gives the 1st place getter the first week off and allows the top 3 teams a "2nd chance" to make the grand final.

Round	Match	Name	Team 1		Team 2	Score
1	A	Elimination Final	Blacktown	v	Bonnyrigg	1(7) – 1(6)
	B	Qualifying Final	Sydney United	v	Sutherland	2–1
2	C	1st semi-final	Sutherland	v	Blacktown	1–2
	D	2nd semi-final	Sydney Olympic	v	Sydney United	2–0
3	E	Preliminary Final	Sydney United	v	Blacktown	4–2
4	F	Grand Final	Sydney Olympic	v	Sydney United	2–0

Qualifying and elimination finals
2	Sydney United	1(7)
3	Sutherland	1(6)
4	Blacktown	2
5	Bonnyrigg	1

Semi-finals
1	Sydney Olympic	2
Sydney United	0
Sutherland	1
Blacktown	2

Preliminary final
Sydney United	4
Blacktown	2

Grand final
Sydney Olympic	2
Sydney United	0

== Leading Goal Scorers ==
Correct as of Round 16

Player	Team	Goals
(Australia) Luka Glavas	Sydney United	13
(Australia) Matt Bailey	Sutherland Sharks	10
(United States) Alex Smith†	Sydney Olympic	8
(Australia) Mark Picciolini	South Coast	8
(Australia) Travis Major	Blacktown City Demons	7

† Alex Smith left Sydney Olympic, and the NSW Premier League to join Gold Coast United in the A-League.
