= 2011 Waratah Cup =

Tournament details
- Country: Australia (NSW)
- Teams: 88

Final positions
- Champions: Manly United

Tournament statistics
- Matches played: 87
- Goals scored: 384 (4.41 per match)

The 2011 Waratah Cup was the 9th season of Football NSW's knockout cup competition under the Waratah Cup name. 33 different Associations registered teams into the tournament, including Canberra City FC from the ACT, Wagga Wagga from the Riverina, and three clubs from the Illawarra Region. Entry levels are staggered, with State League Two clubs entering in Round 1, Super League and State League One clubs entering in Round 2, while all NSW Premier League clubs joined in Round 3.

The competition was won by NSW Premier League club Manly United, their first title.

†–After extra time

== Preliminary round ==
The draw was announced on 23 March 2011, and all games were played by 31 March 2011.

Tie no	Home team	Score	Away team	Ground
1	Padstow United	3–4	All Saints Oatley	Playford Park
2	Olympic Eagles	1–8	Fairfield Wanderers FC	Heffron Park
3	Barden Ridgebacks	0–1	Bonnet Bay	The Ridge
4	Bass Hill	3–2	Hurstville City Minotaurs	Walshaw Park
5	Gymea United	6–4 †	Luddenham United	Crest Soccer Fields
6	Mosman FC	0–1	Northbridge FC	Christie Park
7	Nepean FC	0–2	Pacific Hills	Cook Park
8	Gunners Soccer Club	2–3	Waverly Old Boys	Bensley Rd
9	FC Gazy Lansvale	4–0	Dee Why FC	Cherrybrook Park
10	Eastwood St. Andrews	7–1	Gwawley Bay	Christie Park
11	Chullora Wolves	4–1	Bringelly Football Clubs	Playford Park
12	Rydalmere FC	2–6	Dunbar Rovers	William Lawson Res
13	Lokomotiv Cove FC	2–2 †	Como West Jannali	Alexandria Oval
Como West Jannali advance 4–2 on penalties.
14	Bankstown Sports Strikers	0–2	Pagewood Botany FC	Crest Soccer Fields
15	Prospect United	2–3	Enfield Rovers (A)*	William Lawson Res
16	F.C Lansvale United	1–2	Chopin Park Rams FC	Hartley Oval
17	Hawkesbury City SC	3–0	Glebe Wanderers	Bensons Lane
18	Redbacks Football Club	5–2	Arncliffe Aurora	George Thornton
19	Springwood United SC	0–2	Glenmore Park	Summerhayes Park
20	Hakoah FC	2–0	Roosters FC	Hensley Athletic

- Enfield Rovers fielded two teams in the competition.
- Teams receiving a Bye into the First Round : Caringbah Redbacks, Port Kembla, Wagga United; Dandaloo Football Club, Canberra FC, Picton Rangers, Menai Hawks, Lidcombe Waratah, Belmore Hercules, Bathurst '75, Collaroy Cromer and Enfield Rovers (B)

== First round ==
Tie no	Home team	Score	Away team	Ground
1	Fairfield Wanderers	2–1	Belmore Hercules	Knight Park 4
2	Bass Hill	1–4	Northbridge FC	Walshaw Park
3	Collaroy Cromer	w/o	Gymea United	Cromer Park
Walkover for Collaroy Cromer; Gymea United removed.
4	FC Gazy Lansvale	3–1	Bonnet Bay	Cherrybrook Park
5	Eastwood St. Andrews	3–0	Waverly Old Boys	Christie Park
6	Pacific Hills	2–1	Dunbar Rovers	Christie Park
7	Redbacks Football Club	0–2 †	Como West Jannali	George Thomton
8	Hakoah FC	6–2	Chullora Wolves	Hensley Athletic
9	Hawkesbury City SC	6–0	Enfield Rovers (B)	Bensons Lane
10	Chopin Park Rams	2–0	Lidcombe Waratah	Bensons Lane
11	Caringbah Redbacks	1–4 †	Pagewood Botany	Seymour Shaw Park
12	Port Kembla	4–0	Enfield Rovers (A)	Wetherill Park Primbee
13	Picton Rangers	1–0	Menai Hawks	Wetherill Park Primbee
14	Dandaloo FC	7–1	All Saints Oatley	JJ Kelly Park
15	Glenmore Park	1–3	Bathurst '75	Parker St. Oval
16	Canberra FC	9–1	Wagga United	Deakin Stadium

== Second round ==
Tie no	Home team	Score	Away team	Ground
1	Blacktown Spartans FC	3–0 †	Balmain FC	Francis Park
2	Central Coast Lightning	1–2	Fairfield Bulls	Pluim Park
3	Fraser Park FC	2–1	Pacific Hills Dural	Fraser Park
4	Hills Brumbies	4–3	Gladesville-Ryde Magic	Second Ponds Oval
5	Macarthur Rams	3–1	Canberra FC	Lynwood Park
6	St George FC	7–3	Inter Lions	St. George Stadium
7	Spirit FC	1–3	Northbridge FC	Christie Park
8	Pagewood-Botany	0–5	Granville Rage	Hensley Athletic
9	Sydney University	2–1	UNSW	Sydney Uni. Oval 1
10	West Sydney Berries	4–0	Stanmore Hawks	Lidcombe Oval
11	Mt Druitt Town Rangers	2–1 †	Dulwich Hill FC	Popondetta Park
12	Mounties Wanderers	7–0	Como-West Jannali	Cook Park
13	Schofield Scorpions	3–0	Bathurst '75	CSI Sports Ground
14	Camden Tigers	1–2	Fairfield City	Ron Dine Reserve
15	Port Kembla	2–1	Hurstville ZFC	Wetherill Park Primbee
16	Hakoah	0–1	Dandaloo FC	Hensley Athletic
17	Hawkesbury SC	w/o	Collaroy Cromer	
Walkover for Hawkesbury SC; Collaroy Cromer removed.
18	Chopin Park Rams	3–3 †	Eastwood St. Andrews	Bensons Lane
Chopin Park Rams advance 6–5 on penalties.
19	FC Gazy Lansvale	2–1	Picton Rangers	Cherrybrook Park
20	Fairfield Wanderers	2–0	Northern Tigers	Knight Park

== Third round ==
Tie no	Home team	Score	Away team	Ground
1	Fraser Park FC	4–3 †	Chopin Park Rams	Fraser Park
2	Bonnyrigg White Eagles	2–3	Sydney Olympic	Bonnyrigg Sports Club
3	Mounties Wanderers	2–0	FC Gazy Lansvale	Cook Park
4	Blacktown City Demons	3–0	Fairfield Bulls	Gabbie Stadium
5	Sydney United	4–2 †	Sydney University	Sydney United Sports Centre
6	Bankstown City Lions	1–0	Schofield Scorpions	Jensen Oval
7	Mt Druitt Town Rangers	4–7	Northbridge FC	Popondetta Park
8	Marcarthur Rams	2–1	Fairfield City Lions	Lynwood Park
9	Marconi Stallions	2–3	West Sydney Berries	Marconi Stadium
10	APIA	5–0	Fairfield Wanderers	Lambert Park
11	Blacktown Spartans FC	3–1	Port Kembla	Francis Park
12	Hills Brumbies	3–1	Rockdale City Suns	Second Ponds Reserve
13	Hawkesbury City SC	1–4	South Coast Wolves	Bensons Lane
14	Granville Rage	0–2	Sutherland Sharks	Garside Park
15	St George FC	2–3	Parramatta Eagles	St.George Stadium
16	Manly United	3–2	Dandaloo FC	Cromer Park

== Fourth round ==
Tie no	Home team	Score	Away team	Ground
1	Sydney Olympic	3–0	Blacktown City Demons	Belmore Oval
2	South Coast Wolves	3–2 †	Bankstown City Lions	John Crehan Park
3	Parramatta Eagles	3–1	Sutherland Sharks	Melita Stadium
4	Mounties Wanderers	3–1	West Sydney Berries	Cook Park
5	APIA Leichhardt Tigers	4–3 †	Macarthur Rams	Lambert Park
6	Hills Brumbies	1–0	Sydney United	Second Ponds Oval
7	Manly United	3–0	Fraser Park FC	Cromer Park
8	Blacktown Spartans FC	3–1	Northbridge FC	Francis Park

== Quarterfinals ==
The draw for the quarterfinals was announced on 14 June 2011. Of the 8 teams, 5 were from the NSW Premier League, 2 clubs (Hills Brumbies F.C. & Blacktown Spartans) from the NSW Super League, whilst Mounties Wanderers play in the State League One.

21 June 2011

Manly United	2–1 (aet)	Hills Brumbies F.C.
Balderson 88'; Cattanach 116'	Report:	Bergamin 90+2'

Cromer Park
Referee: Andrew Best
22 June 2011

Sydney Olympic	2–3 (aet)	Mounties Wanderers
Makrys 81'; Luksic 88'	Report:	Day 24'; Squillacioti 54'; Willoughby 108'

Belmore Oval
Referee: Kurt Ams
22 June 2011

APIA	0–2	Blacktown Spartans
	Report:	Ghobriel 24'; Mohebee 90+2'; Cornett (yellow card) 38' (yellow-red card) 43'

Lambert Park
Referee: James Lewis
22 June 2011

South Coast Wolves	3–1	Parramatta
Kaynak 24', 60'; Picciolini 69' (pen.)	Report:	Ardle 3'

John Crehan Park
Referee: Alex Glasgow

== Semi-finals ==
29 June 2011

South Coast Wolves	1–4	Manly United
Picciolini 28'	Report - Football NSW Article	Iley 2', 34'; Daly 63'; Cattanach 78'

John Crehan Park
Referee: Alex Glasgow
29 June 2011

Mounties Wanderers	3–2	Blacktown Spartans
	Report - Football NSW Article

== Grand final ==
10 July 2011

Manly United	4–0	Mounties Wanderers
Balderson 46'; Foti 60' (pen.); Edwards 87'; Hayward 90+2'	Report - Football NSW Article	Rodden-Ward (red card)

Bonnyrigg Sports Club
Referee: Khodr Yaghi

== See also ==
- NSW Premier League
- NSW Super League
- NSW State League Division One
- NSW State League Division Two
- Football NSW
