= 2009 NSW Premier League season =

TeleChoice Premier League 2009
- League: NSW Premier League
- Sport: Association football
- Duration: 1 March 2009 – 13 September 2009
- Teams: 12
- Total attendance: 75,698 (approximately)

2009
- Champions: Sutherland Sharks FC
- Premiers: Sydney United FC
- Top scorer: Matthew Mayora (15)

2009 TigerTurf Cup
- Champions: Sutherland Sharks FC

NSW Premier League seasons
- ← 2008 2010 →

The 2009 TeleChoice Premier League season was the ninth season of the revamped National Premier Leagues NSW. This season also marked the addition of the Bonnyrigg White Eagles Football Club, promoted from the Super League.

The 2009 regular season began on 1 March, and concluded on 9 August. The Finals series commenced a fortnight later. On 13 September the Sutherland Sharks Football Club won their second championship of the year when they defeated Marconi Stallions 4–1 in the Grand Final at CUA Stadium.

During the course of the season, all Premier League, Super League and Division teams were involved in the TigerTurf Cup, an equivalent to the English FA Cup with teams competing in a series of elimination games. On 16 August the Sutherland Sharks Football Club were crowned the Cup Champions after defeating Manly United FC 1–0.

== Clubs ==
Teams promoted from Super League:
(After the end of the 2008 season.)

- Bonnyrigg White Eagles

Teams relegated to Super League:
(After the end of the 2008 season.)

- Macarthur Rams

Club	Ground	Capacity
APIA Tigers	Leichhardt Oval	20,000
Bankstown City Lions FC	Jensen Oval	8,000
Blacktown City Demons FC	Fairfax Community Stadium	7,500
Bonnyrigg White Eagles FC	Bonnyrigg Sports Club	5,000
Manly United FC	Cromer Park	5,000
Marconi Stallions FC	Marconi Stadium	11,500
Penrith Nepean United FC	CUA Stadium	21,000
Sutherland Sharks FC	Seymour Shaw Park	5,000
Sydney Olympic FC	Belmore Sports Ground	25,000
Sydney United FC	Sydney United Sports Centre	12,000
West Sydney Berries FC	Lidcombe Oval	20,000
Wollongong Community FC	Hooka Creek Park	5,000

=== Managerial changes ===
Team	Outgoing	Manner	Date	Incoming	Date
Sydney Olympic FC	(Australia) Aytek Genc	Resigned	31 March 2009	(Greece) Nick Theodorakopoulos	2 April 2009
Bonnyrigg White Eagles FC	(Australia) Blagoja Kuleski	Sacked	30 March 2009	(Australia) Brian Brown	4 April 2009
Sydney Tigers FC	(Australia) Paul Okon	Resigned	18 March 2009	(Australia) Luke McGuire	5 April 2009
Wollongong CFC	(Australia) Tony Pace	Sacked	23 April 2009	(Australia) Glenn Fontana (interim)	23 April 2009
Penrith Nepean United	(Australia) Ian Gillan	Mutual Agreement	23 June 2009	(Australia) Ante Juric	23 June 2009
Sydney Olympic FC	(Greece) Nick Theodorakopoulos	Resigned	2 September 2009	(Australia) Pat Marando	2 September 2009
Wollongong CFC	(Australia) Glenn Fontana	Mutual Agreement	12 September 2009	(Australia) Trevor Morgan	12 September 2009

== Regular season ==
=== League table ===
Pos	Team	Pld	W	D	L	GF	GA	GD	Pts	Qualification or relegation
1	Sydney United	22	13	7	2	42	22	+20	46	Qualified for the 2009 NSW Premier League Finals
2	Marconi Stallions	22	11	6	5	44	22	+22	39	Qualified for the 2009 NSW Premier League Finals
3	Sutherland Sharks (C)	22	10	8	4	46	26	+20	38	Qualified for the 2009 NSW Premier League Finals
4	Bankstown City	22	11	5	6	39	31	+8	38	Qualified for the 2009 NSW Premier League Finals
5	Manly United	22	10	7	5	33	22	+11	37	Qualified for the 2009 NSW Premier League Finals
6	West Sydney Berries	22	8	6	8	37	37	0	30	
7	Blacktown City	22	7	7	8	29	31	−2	28	
8	Sydney Olympic	22	8	4	10	37	43	−6	28	
9	Bonnyrigg White Eagles	22	6	8	8	28	39	−11	26	
10	Penrith Nepean United	22	6	5	11	19	31	−12	23	Withdrew at end of the season
11	APIA Leichhardt Tigers	22	5	7	10	30	38	−8	22	
12	South Coast Wolves	22	1	2	19	20	62	−42	5	

Source: TeleChoice Premier League
Rules for classification: 1) points; 2) goal difference; 3) number of goals scored.
(C) Champions

=== Results ===
The results of the 2009 Home and Away season are as follows:

Home \ Away	BCL	BCD	BWE	MU	MS	PNU	SS	SO	ST	SU	WSB	WC
Bankstown City Lions		4–2	0–0	0–2	2–1	2–0	4–2	2–1	5–3	1–1	2–2	1–0
Blacktown City Demons	3–2		0–1	3–3	0–3	1–1	0–0	0–1	2–1	0–3	1–2	3–0
Bonnyrigg White Eagles	0–2	0–0		1–4	1–5	1–1	1–3	4–3	1–5	1–1	3–3	2–0
Manly United	2–0	0–1	2–1		0–0	2–1	0–0	1–2	1–1	2–3	3–0	1–1
Marconi Stallions	2–2	3–1	2–1	1–1		2–0	0–2	2–1	1–1	1–2	2–3	2–0
Penrith Nepean United	0–0	1–1	0–1	2–0	0–3		0–2	3–2	1–0	0–4	1–2	1–0
Sutherland Sharks	3–4	0–0	3–4	0–1	1–1	2–1		4–1	0–0	2–2	3–0	3–0
Sydney Olympic	2–1	2–1	1–1	2–1	1–2	3–2	1–4		1–1	1–1 (Note: Both encounters between Sydney Olympic and Sydney United were Olympic home games with the 1–1 scoreline being the Round 20 battle.)	1–3	5–2
Sydney Tigers	1–0	1–1	0–1	0–1	1–1	0–1	1–3	2–0		1–1	2–0	6–5
Sydney United	1–0	0–3	1–1	2–3	2–1	1–0	2–2	2–1	6–1		2–0	2–1
West Sydney Berries	1–2	1–2	0–0	1–1	0–2	2–2	2–2	4–2	3–1	0–2		6–1
Wollongong Community	2–3	2–4	3–2	0–2	0–7	0–1	1–5	1–1	1–2	0–1	0–2	

Updated to match(es) played on unknown. Source: NSW Premier League
Legend: Blue = home team win; Yellow = draw; Red = away team win.

== Finals series ==
Qualifying Finals
2	Marconi Stallions	0
3	Sutherland Sharks	1
4	Bankstown City	0(2)
5	Manly United (p)	0(4)

Semi-finals
1	Sydney United FC	2
3	Sutherland Sharks	3
2	Marconi Stallions	2
5	Manly United FC	0

Preliminary Final
1	Sydney United FC	2
2	Marconi Stallions	4

Grand Final
3	Sutherland Sharks	4
2	Marconi Stallions	1

=== First Week ===
22 August 2009 Elimination Final	Bankstown City Lions FC	0–0 (a.e.t.) (2–4 p)	Manly United FC	Jensen Oval, Sefton
19:30 UTC+10		Report		Attendance: 1,000 approx. Referee: Peter Vrtkovski
	Penalties
	Makrys (penalty scored); Martin (penalty scored)		Mailer (penalty scored); Midgley (penalty scored); Thomas (penalty scored); Shevlin (penalty scored)

23 August 2009 Qualifying Final	Marconi Stallions FC	0–1	Sutherland Sharks FC	Marconi Stadium, Bossley Park
15:00 UTC+10		Report	Nikas 47'	Attendance: 1,100 approx. Referee: Gerard Parsons

=== Second week ===
29 August 2009 Minor semi-final	Marconi Stallions FC	2–0	Manly United FC	Marconi Stadium, Bossley Park
18:00 UTC+10	Al-Hilfi 95'; Diarra 122'	Report		Attendance: 500 approx. Referee: Kris Griffith-Jones

30 August 2009 Major semi-final	Sydney United FC	2–3	Sutherland Sharks FC	Sydney United Sports Centre, Sydney
16:00 UTC+10	Milicic 45'; Petkovic 58'	Report	Nikas 69' (pen.); Bakis 86'; Price 90+2'	Attendance: 1,500; Referee: Kurt Ams

=== Preliminary final ===
6 September 2009	Sydney United FC	2–4	Marconi Stallions FC	Sydney United Sports Centre, Sydney
16:00 UTC+10	Milicic 24'; Glavas 75' (pen.)	Report	Canak 5'; Anabalon 23'; Oostendorp 33', 66'	Attendance: 1,100 approx. Referee: Gerard Parsons

=== Grand Final ===
13 September 2009	Sutherland Sharks FC	4–1	Marconi Stallions FC	CUA Stadium, Penrith
15:00 UTC+10	Jablonski 27'; Boardman 75'; Katz 86'; Nikas 90+3'	Report	Arrarte 71'	Attendance: 3,000 approx. Referee: Peter Vrtkovski

== Statistics ==
=== Top goalscorers ===
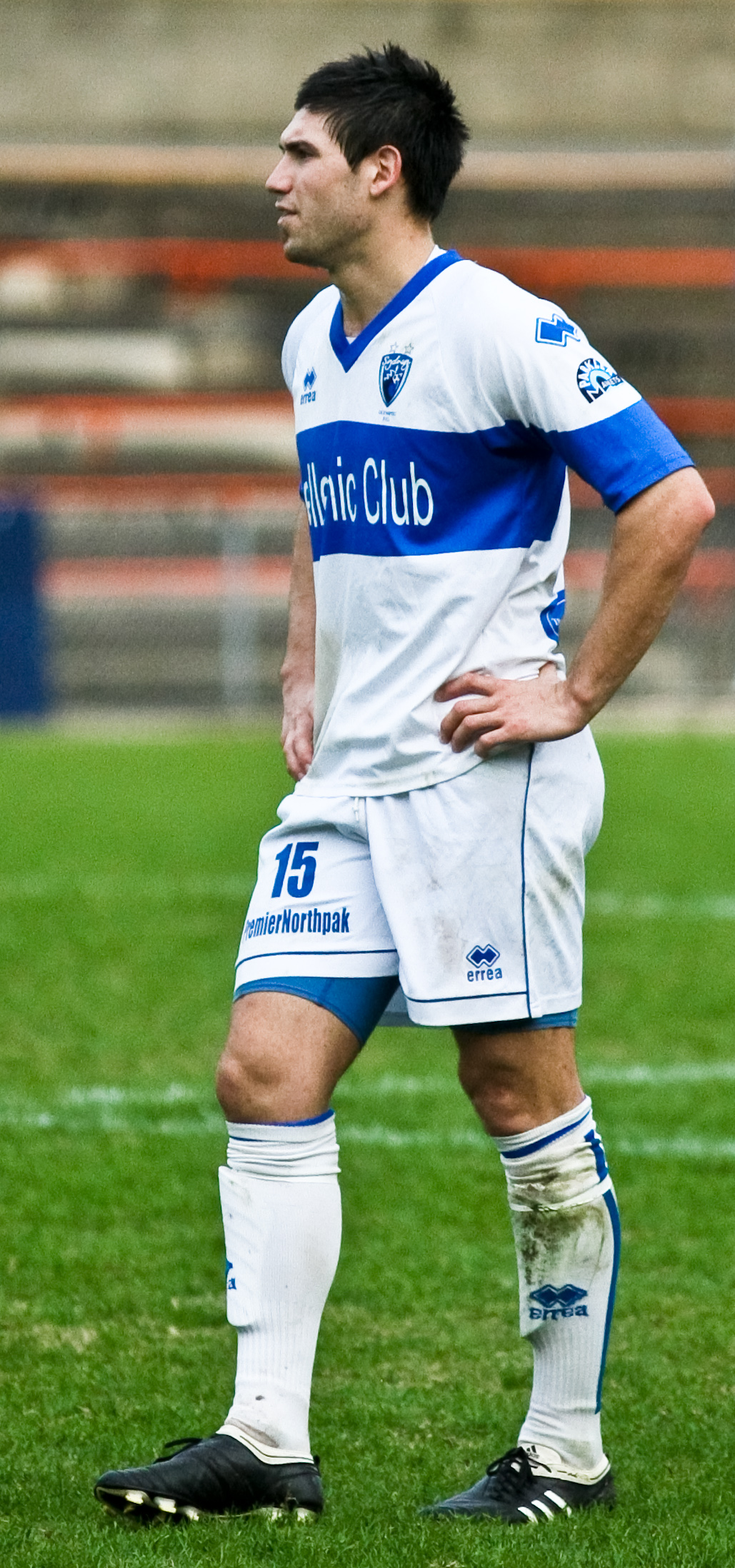
Matthew Mayora won the Golden Boot with 15 goals

Rank	Scorer	Club	Goals
1	(Australia) Matthew Mayora	Sydney Olympic	15
2	(Australia) Brad Boardman	Sutherland	12
2	(Australia) Dimitri Zakilas	West Sydney	12
4	(Australia) Luka Glavaš	Sydney United	11
4	(Greece) Panni Nikas	Sutherland	11
4	(Lebanon) Hussein Salameh	Bankstown	11
4	(Australia) Robert Younis	Sydney Tigers	11
8	(Turkey) Tolgay Özbey	Sydney Olympic	10
8	(Australia) Alexander Canak	Marconi	10
10	(Australia) Almir Dizdaric	Bonnyrigg	9

=== Scoring ===
- First hat-trick of the season: Jamie McMaster (Sydney Tigers) against Bonnyrigg (1 March)
- Most goals scored by one player in a match: 4 goals – Robert Younis (Sydney Tigers) against Wollongong, (9 August)
- Widest winning margin: 7 goals – Marconi 7–0 Wollongong (19 April)
- Most goals in a match: 11 goals
  - Sydney Tigers 6–5 Wollongong (9 August)
- All season goals (excluding finals): 404 goals

=== Clean sheets ===
- Most clean sheets – Sutherland (9)
- Fewest clean sheets – Wollongong (0)

=== Attendances ===
The table is for the home and away season and does not include finals series attendances.

Team	Hosted	Average	Highest	Lowest	Total
Sydney Olympic FC	11	893	1,600	612	20,878
Bonnyrigg White Eagles FC	11	812	1,300	550	14,105
Sutherland Sharks FC	11	542	1,004	400	7,937
Sydney United FC	11	519	1,002	360	7,910
Marconi Stallions FC	11	493	1,004	500	6,854
Bankstown City Lions FC	11	474	750	300	6,200
Wollongong Community FC	11	454	1,189	250	6,089
Blacktown City Demons FC	11	320	1,000	150	5,250
APIA Tigers	10	340	750	300	4,600
Penrith Nepean United FC	11	335	500	250	4,350
Manly United FC	11	333	850	100	4,100
West Sydney Berries FC	11	293	550	150	3,220
Totals	132	484	1,600	100	1,010,986

== Awards ==
=== Gold medal dinner ===
At the end of the season, Football NSW hosted the Gold Medal Dinner, where players, coaches and referees were awarded for their work throughout the Premier League season.

Award	Name	Club
Player of the Year	Brad Boardman	Sutherland Sharks
Andreas Golden Boot	Matthew Mayora	Sydney Olympic
Goalkeeper of the Year	Vedran Janjetovic	Sydney United
Coach of the Year	Ante Milicic	Sydney United
Referee of the Year	Peter Vrtkovski	–

=== All-Stars Team ===

All-Stars Team

Based on a points system in which all match reporters took part in during the course of the 22 rounds, eleven players were selected in various positions highlighting their performances for the season.

Goalkeeper: Vedran Janjetovic (Sydney United)

Defence: Michael Robinson (Sutherland Sharks), Shane Webb (Bankstown City Lions), Joe Vrkic (Sydney United), Richard Luksic (Bankstown City Lions)

Midfield: Scott Thomas (Manly United), Ali Abbas Al-Hilfi (Marconi Stallions), Panni Nikas (Sutherland Sharks), Alexander Canak (Marconi Stallions)

Attack: Brad Boardman (Sutherland Sharks), Luka Glavas (Sydney United)

Coach: Ante Milicic (Sydney United)

== See also ==
- National Premier Leagues NSW
- Football NSW
