= 2008 NSW Premier League season =

NSW Premier League
- Champions: Wollongong FC
- Premiers: Sutherland Sharks FC
- Top goalscorer: Robert Younis (21)

The 2008 TeleChoice Premier League season was the eighth season of the revamped NSW Premier League. This season also marked the promotion of two new teams, in the West Sydney Berries and the Macarthur Rams from the Super League (one division lower). This increased the teams competing in the competition from 10 to 12 teams and the number of rounds from 18 to 22 in the regular season.

The 2008 season officially began on 22 February and concluded with the grand final between Wollongong FC and the Sutherland Sharks on 7 September.

Before the start of the season, all the 2008 teams competed in the Johnny Warren Cup, the official pre-season tournament. On 16 February, Sydney Olympic defeated the Sutherland Sharks 2 goals to 1 at Seymour Shaw Park to win the Johnny Warren Cup.

Throughout the season many Premier League, Super League, Division One and Division Two teams competed in an FA Cup-style knockout competition in which the Bankstown City Lions and Sydney Olympic contested the grand final with Bankstown prevailing 3–1 winners.

== Changes from Previous Season ==
The number of teams competing increased from 10 to 12, with the inclusion of the West Sydney Berries and the Macarthur Rams. The regular season remained a home-away round-robin format, thus increasing the number of rounds from 18 to 22. The final series was therefore also adapted. The number of teams competing in the finals series increased from 4 to 5. The finals series used a 5-team McIntyre system to determine the champions.

== Clubs ==
Teams promoted from Super League:
(After the end of the 2007 season.)

- West Sydney Berries
- Macarthur Rams

Teams relegated to Super League:
(After the end of the 2007 season.)

- Nil

Club	Ground	Capacity
A.P.I.A. Leichhardt Tigers	Lambert Park	7,000
Bankstown City Lions FC	Jensen Oval	8,000
Blacktown City Demons FC	Fairfax Community Stadium	7,500
Macarthur Rams	Campbelltown Stadium	20,000
Manly United FC	Cromer Park	5,000
Marconi Stallions FC	Marconi Stadium	11,500
Penrith Nepean United FC	CUA Stadium	21,000
Sutherland Sharks FC	Seymour Shaw Park	5,000
Sydney Olympic FC	Belmore Sports Ground	25,000
Sydney United FC	Sydney United Sports Centre	12,000
West Sydney Berries FC	Sydney Olympic Park Athletic Centre	18,000
Wollongong FC	John Crehan Park	7,500

== Regular season ==
=== League table ===
Pos	Team	Pld	W	D	L	GF	GA	GD	Pts	Qualification or relegation
1	Sutherland Sharks	22	12	8	2	48	19	+29	44	Qualified for the Championship Finals series
2	Wollongong FC (C)	22	13	5	4	39	19	+20	44	Qualified for the Championship Finals series
3	Sydney Olympic	22	12	5	5	38	23	+15	41	Qualified for the Championship Finals series
4	Manly United	22	12	3	7	42	21	+21	39	Qualified for the Championship Finals series
5	Sydney United	22	9	7	6	29	21	+8	34	Qualified for the Championship Finals series
6	APIA Leichhardt Tigers	22	9	7	6	41	35	+6	34	
7	Bankstown City	22	7	6	9	27	27	0	27	
8	West Sydney Berries	22	7	3	12	30	41	−11	24	
9	Marconi Stallions	22	3	10	9	29	41	−12	19	
10	Macarthur Rams (R)	22	4	7	11	16	41	−25	19	Relegation to Super League
11	Penrith Nepean United	22	3	8	11	25	50	−25	17	
12	Blacktown City	22	3	7	12	14	40	−26	16	

Source: NSW Premier League Ladder @ SportingPulse
Rules for classification: 1) points; 2) goal difference; 3) number of goals scored.
(C) Champions; (R) Relegated

=== Results ===
Home \ Away	API	BAN	BLC	MAR	MAN	MST	PNU	SUT	SYO	SYU	WSB	WOL
APIA Leichhardt Tigers		1–1	3–0	2–0	1–0	2–0	7–0	2–2	3–4	0–3	3–2	1–1
Bankstown City	3–0		4–0	2–1	0–3	0–2	1–1	0–0	3–0	0–0	1–2	1–2
Blacktown City	1–1	1–1		1–1	0–4	2–1	0–0	3–1	0–2	1–3	0–2	1–1
Macarthur Rams	0–3	0–4	1–0		0–1	0–1	3–2	1–1	0–0	1–1	0–3	0–1
Manly United	3–3	0–1	3–0	2–2		3–0	1–0	0–1	0–2	1–2	2–1	0–1
Marconi Stallions	2–2	1–3	0–1	1–1	3–3		0–0	3–0	1–3	2–2	2–2	1–1
Penrith Nepean United	3–4	3–0	2–2	1–3	0–4	3–3		0–2	2–4	0–4	4–1	0–1
Sutherland Sharks	4–1	3–1	0–0	2–0	2–1	0–0	7–0		3–0	4–2	6–0	1–1
Sydney Olympic	3–0	1–1	1–0	5–0	1–2	2–2	0–1	1–1		0–0	1–0	4–0
Sydney United	0–1	1–0	2–0	0–0	0–1	3–0	2–2	2–2	0–1		1–0	0–2
West Sydney Berries	1–1	2–0	4–1	1–2	0–4	5–2	1–1	0–4	3–1	0–1		0–2
Wollongong FC	2–0	3–0	3–0	7–0	1–4	3–2	0–0	1–2	1–2	3–0	2–0	

Updated to match(es) played on 3 August 2008. Source: socceraust.co.uk
Legend: Blue = home team win; Yellow = draw; Red = away team win.

== Finals series ==
Qualifying Finals
2	Wollongong FC	3
3	Sydney Olympic FC	2
4	Manly United FC	2
5	Sydney United FC	1

Semi-finals
1	Sutherland Sharks	1
2	Wollongong FC	2
3	Sydney Olympic	2
4	Manly United FC	1

Preliminary final
1	Sutherland Sharks	2
3	Sydney Olympic FC	1

Grand final
2	Wollongong FC	4
1	Sutherland Sharks	2

=== Qualifying Finals ===
15 August 2008 Qualifying Final	Wollongong FC	3–2	Sydney Olympic FC	WIN Stadium, Wollongong
19:30 UTC+10	Ilija Prenzoski 12', 90'; Matt Bailey 84'	Report	Siraj Al Tall 73'; Matthew Mayora 75'	Attendance: 1,200 approx. Referee: Strebre Delovski

15 August 2008 Elimination final	Manly United FC	2–1	Sydney United FC	Cromer Park, Sydney
19:45 UTC+10	Craig Midgley 56', 85'	Report	Luka Glavaš 61'	Attendance: 1,000 approx. Referee: Peter Vrtkovski

=== Semi-finals ===
24 August 2008 Minor semi-final	Sydney Olympic FC	2–1	Manly United FC	Belmore Sports Ground, Sydney
15:00 UTC+10	Paul Wither 32', 61'	Report	Michael Lloyd-Green 47'	Attendance: 900 approx. Referee: Atila Stibinger

24 August 2008 Major semi-final	Sutherland Sharks FC	1–2	Wollongong FC	Seymour Shaw Park, Sydney
15:00 UTC+10	Jim Bakis 10'	Report	Matt Bailey 66'; Ilija Prenzoski 106'	Attendance: 983; Referee: Peter Vrtkovski

=== Preliminary final ===
20 August 2008	Sutherland Sharks FC	2–1	Sydney Olympic FC	Seymour Shaw Park, Sydney
19:30 UTC+10	David Reid 13'; Nick Stavroulakis 25'	Report	Anthony Hartshorn 53'	Attendance: 1,020; Referee: James Lewis

=== Grand final ===
7 September 2008	Wollongong FC	4–2	Sutherland Sharks FC	CUA Stadium, Sydney
15:00 UTC+10	Matt Bailey 28'; Tynan Diaz 38'; Chris Price 60' (pen.); Samet Kaynak 90+3'	Report	Nick Stavroulakis 8'; Neil Jablonski 90+2'	Attendance: 4,586 approx. Referee: Jonathan Streater

== Gold Medal Dinner ==
At the end of the season, Football NSW hosted the Gold Medal Dinner, where players, coaches and referees were awarded for their work throughout the Premier League season.

Award	Grade	Name	Club
Player of the Year	First Grade	Brendan Gan	Sutherland Sharks
Andreas Golden Boot	First Grade	Robert Younis	A.P.I.A. Leichhardt Tigers
Player of the Year	20's	Daniel Rezo	Sydney United
Golden Boot	20's	Brodie Mooy	Marconi Stallions
Goalkeeper of the Year	First Grade	Matthew Nash	A.P.I.A. Leichhardt Tigers
Coach of the Year	First Grade	Brian Brown	Sutherland Sharks
Referee of the Year	–	Jonathan Streater	–

=== All-Stars Team ===

All-Stars Team

Based on a points system in which all match reporters took part in during the course of the 22 rounds, eleven players were selected in various positions highlighting their performances for season 2008.

Goalkeeper: Matthew Nash (A.P.I.A. Leichhardt Tigers)

Defence: Emmanuel Zunino (Sydney Olympic), Pedj Bojić (Sutherland Sharks), Danial Cummins (Wollongong FC), Shane Webb (Bankstown City Lions)

Midfield: Nahuel Arrarte (Marconi Stallions), Robbie Cattanach (Manly United), Brendan Gan (Sutherland Sharks), Christopher Boyle (Sydney United)

Attack: Robert Younis (A.P.I.A. Leichhardt Tigers), Brad Boardman (Sutherland Sharks)

Coach: (Australia) Brian "Bomber" Brown

== See also ==
- NSW Premier League
- Football NSW
