= Steve Hayes (footballer) =

Australian soccer player (born 1985)

Personal information
- Date of birth: 1 February 1985 (age 41)
- Place of birth: Canberra, Australia
- Height: 1.77 m (5 ft 9 1/2 in)
- Position: Midfielder

Team information
- Current team: Wollongong Wolves

Senior career*
Years	Team	Apps	(Gls)
2007–2009	South Coast Wolves		
2010–2012	Sydney United		
2013	United Sikkim	1	(0)
2013–2014	South Coast Wolves		
2014	Biu Chun Rangers		
2015–2016	Sutherland Sharks	30	(2)
2015–2016	Wollongong Wolves	22	(1)
- * Club domestic league appearances and goals as of 13 January 2017

Steve Hayes (born 1 February 1985 in Canberra, Australia) is an Australian professional soccer player who plays as a midfielder (formerly central midfielder at Shrewsbury Town) for Hong Kong First Division League club Biu Chun Rangers.

Steve Hayes has experience with the FA Cup against Wolverhampton at Gay Meadow for Shrewsbury Town.
