= Matthew Mayora =

Australian soccer player (born 1986)

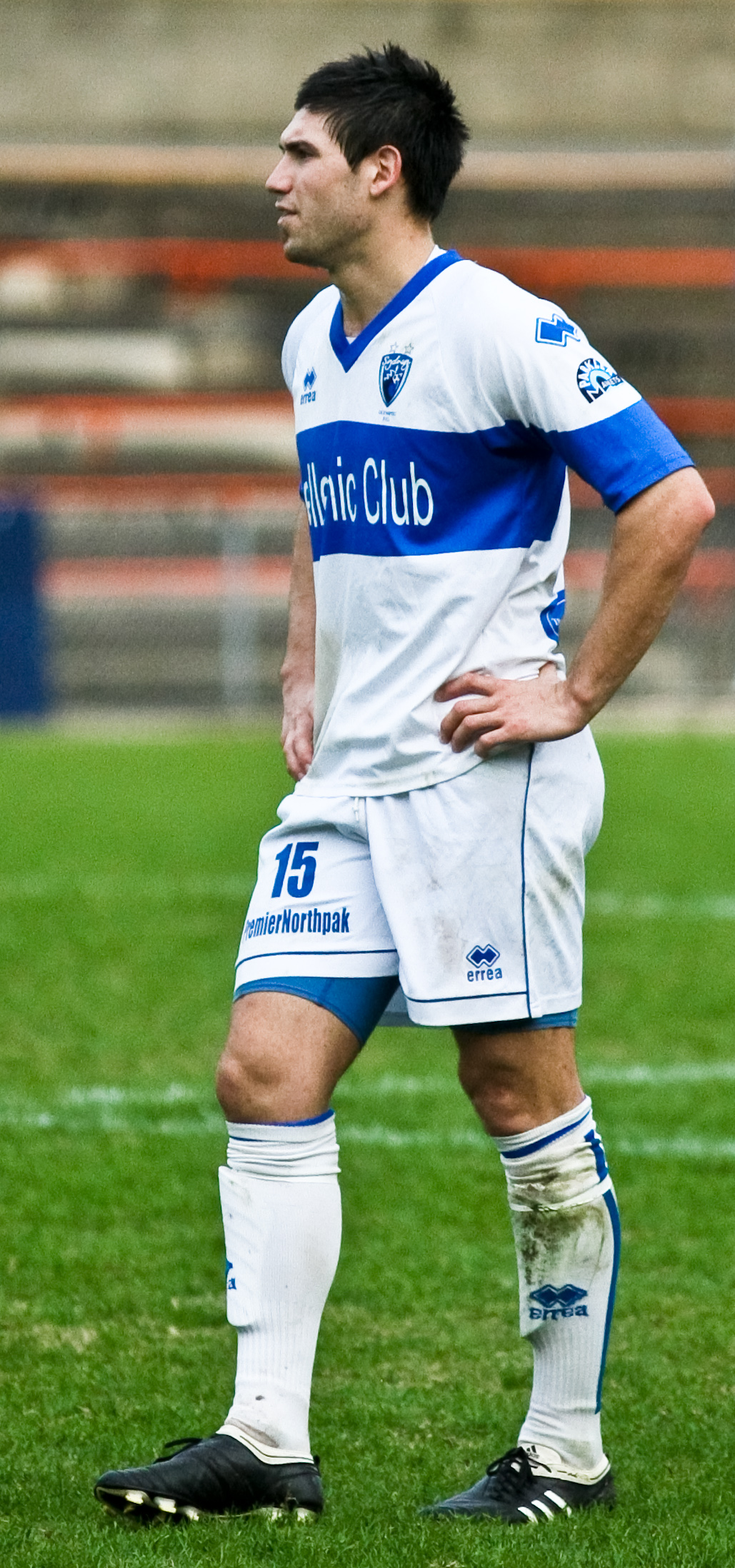

Personal information
- Date of birth: 10 March 1986 (age 40)
- Place of birth: Sydney, Australia
- Height: 1.86 m (6 ft 1 in)
- Position: Striker

Youth career
- Bonnyrigg White Eagles

Senior career*
Years	Team	Apps	(Gls)
2005–2007	Bonnyrigg White Eagles	83	(5)
2008–2009	Sydney Olympic	37	(25)
2009	→ Perth Glory (loan)	4	(0)
2009	Persipura Jayapura	0	(0)
2010	Sydney Olympic	20	(6)
2010	Lautoka F.C.	0	(0)
2011	Marconi Stallions	13	(4)
2012	Southern Samity	0	(0)
2012	Shillong Lajong FC	4	(3)
2012	Sydney Olympic	14	(4)
2013	Blacktown City	21	(1)
2014	APIA Leichhardt	13	(2)
2015	Mounties Wanderers	5	(0)
2016–2018	Rydalmere Lions	49	(12)
2018–2021	St George City	25	(7)
- * Club domestic league appearances and goals as of 26 September 2019

Matthew Mayora (born 10 March 1986 in Sydney) is a former Australian footballer.

== Club career ==
He was crowned the 2009 NSWPL Golden Boot winner with a haul of 15 goals in 20 matches by Sydney Olympic

On 13 August 2009 Mayora signed a six-week injury cover contract with Perth Glory after impressing in a trial. On 16 August 2009 he made his A-League debut for Glory against Wellington Phoenix, coming on in the 88th minute. It was reported he would sign with Indonesian Super League club Persipura Jayapura on 15 September, cutting short his loan to Perth Glory. On 27 October it was decided by the Indonesian club, that he was surplus to requirements and was dropped from his 1-Year contract. He failed to impress several clubs in some trial sessions during pre-season of Indonesian Super League 2009/2010 with Persipura Jayapura who he played a full game for in a cup match. On 11 February 2010 announced his return to his former club Sydney Olympic. After returning to Olympic, Mayora went to Uruguay and trialled for an unnamed club, who offered him a contract, however for personal reasons he declined.

According to the Fijiian local news Mayora signed for NFL club Lautoka F.C. Mayora made his debut for the club in the 2010-11 OFC Champions League matchday one game against Koloale FC Honiara and scored both goals in their 2–1 victory.

Returning from Fiji, Mayora signed on with NSW Premier League outfit Marconi Stallions for the 2011 NSW Premier League season After a cautious start to the 2011 season, Mayora was sent off in the 0–0 draw with Bonnyrigg in Round 5.

Mayora left Marconi halfway through the 2011 NSW Premier League season, and once more went abroad in the hope of securing a professional contract. It was announced that he had signed a contract with I-League club Southern Samity for the 2012 I-League 2nd Division.

On 20 January Mayora signed for I-League side Shillong Lajong FC for the 2011–12 I League season.

On 24 May Mayora made another return to Sydney Olympic for the 2012 season.

Mayora moved out of Belmore for a third time at the end of the 2012 season, where he signed for Blacktown City.

After a disappointing 2014 National Premier Leagues NSW single season at APIA Leichhardt, Mayora dropped a division, and signed for National Premier Leagues NSW 2 club Mounties Wanderers for the 2015 season.

== International career ==
He has expressed interest in playing in Uruguay, reflecting his cultural heritage.

== Personal life ==
Mayora was born to Uruguayan Immigrants.

Mayora is married to Kathleen Kalithas with 3 young children Aleirah Mayora, Brooklyn Mayora and Cleo Mayora.

== Honours ==
=== Individual ===
With: Sydney Olympic

- 2009 NSW Premier League season Golden Boot – 15 Goals
