= 2012 NSW Premier League season =

NSW Premier League 2012
- League: NSW Premier League
- Sport: Association football
- Duration: Autumn/Winter 2012
- Teams: 12

2012
- Champions: Marconi Stallions
- Premiers: Bonnyrigg White Eagles

2012 Waratah Cup
- Champions: Sutherland Sharks

NSW Premier League seasons
- ← 2011 2013 →

The 2012 NSW Premier League season was the 12th season of the revamped NSW Premier League. Despite the Parramatta Eagles finishing last on the ladder, Bankstown City Lions were relegated due to finishing last in the Club Championship. They are replaced by the Blacktown Spartans, who were promoted after winning the 2011 NSW Super League season.

== League table ==
| Pos | Team | Pld | W | D | L | GF | GA | GD | Pts | Qualification or relegation |
|---|---|---|---|---|---|---|---|---|---|---|
| 1 | Bonnyrigg White Eagles | 22 | 17 | 2 | 3 | 50 | 17 | +33 | 53 | Qualified for the Championship Finals Series |
| 2 | Sydney Olympic | 22 | 11 | 5 | 6 | 37 | 26 | +11 | 38 | Qualified for the Championship Finals Series |
| 3 | Marconi Stallions (C) | 22 | 12 | 2 | 8 | 32 | 28 | +4 | 38 | Qualified for the Championship Finals Series |
| 4 | South Coast Wolves | 22 | 12 | 1 | 9 | 41 | 39 | +2 | 37 | Qualified for the Championship Finals Series |
| 5 | Blacktown City | 22 | 9 | 5 | 8 | 40 | 34 | +6 | 32 | Qualified for the Championship Finals Series |
| 6 | APIA Leichhardt Tigers | 22 | 9 | 4 | 9 | 32 | 31 | +1 | 31 | |
| 7 | Rockdale City Suns | 22 | 9 | 3 | 10 | 30 | 33 | −3 | 30 | |
| 8 | Sutherland Sharks | 22 | 8 | 5 | 9 | 34 | 36 | −2 | 29 | |
| 9 | Sydney United | 22 | 7 | 4 | 11 | 27 | 38 | −11 | 25 | |
| 10 | Manly United | 22 | 6 | 5 | 11 | 26 | 33 | −7 | 23 | |
| 11 | Blacktown Spartans | 22 | 6 | 3 | 13 | 26 | 44 | −18 | 21 | |
| 12 | Parramatta Eagles (R) | 22 | 4 | 5 | 13 | 19 | 35 | −16 | 17 | Relegation to 2013 NSW Super League |

Rules for classification: 1) points; 2) goal difference; 3) number of goals scored.
(C) Champions; (R) Relegated

== League Finals ==
Qualifying and elimination finals
2 | Sydney Olympic | 0
3 | Marconi Stallions | 2
4 | South Coast Wolves | 1
5 | Blacktown City | 2

Semi-finals
1 | Bonnyrigg White Eagles | 1
3 | Marconi Stallions | 0
2 | Sydney Olympic | 0
5 | Blacktown City | 1

Preliminary final
3 | Marconi Stallions | 4
5 | Blacktown City | 2

Grand final
1 | Bonnyrigg White Eagles | 0
3 | Marconi Stallions | 2

== Top goalscorers ==
Source:NSW Premier League

- (C)=Regular season champions
- (R)=Relegated to NSW Super League
- (Q)=Qualified for the Finals Series
