= Leigh Gunn =

Australian–Filipino footballer

Personal information
- Full name: Leigh James Gunn
- Date of birth: 24 December 1980 (age 45)
- Place of birth: Sydney, New South Wales, Australia
- Height: 1.78 m (5 ft 10 in)
- Position: Forward

Team information
- Current team: Fraser Park FC
- Number: 9

Youth career
- Bonnyrigg White Eagles

Senior career*
Years	Team	Apps	(Gls)
2000–2001	Bonnyrigg White Eagles	26	(7)
2001	Macarthur Rams	0	(0)
2001–2002	Bonnyrigg White Eagles	6	(3)
2002	Macarthur Rams	0	(0)
2002–2004	Canterbury-Marrickville	26	(12)
2004	Fairfield Bulls	21	(8)
2007	APIA Leichhardt Tigers		
- Fraser Park

International career^{‡}
1999	Philippines U23	?	(?)
1999–2011	Philippines	6	(0)
- * Club domestic league appearances and goals ‡ National team caps and goals as of 15:49, 12 May 2011 (UTC)

Leigh James Gunn (born 24 December 1980) is a former footballer who last played as a forward for Fraser Park FC. Born in Australia, he represented the Philippines at the international level.

== Career ==
=== Club career ===
Gunn played in various Australian clubs during his career. Gunn became the top scorer of Canterbury-Marrickville Olympic during the 2002–03 season with 12 goals.

He also aspired to play abroad, sending resumes to secure trials in clubs in England.

=== International career ===
Gunn is eligible to play for the Philippines through his mother, who hails from Cebu. He contacted then-Philippine Football Federation General Secretary Chris Monfort regarding the prospects of representing the country.

=== Philippines U23 ===
Gunn had his first call-up to the Philippines national U-23 team for the 2000 Summer Olympics preliminary qualifiers from June to July 1999. The team is mentored by Juan Cutillas, who is aware of Gunn's experience in playing in Australia.

He made his debut on 12 June 1999, when the Philippines lopsidedly lost to Japan, 0–13. He also scored his first international goal in the qualifiers in the 2–2 draw with Nepal.

=== Philippines ===
Shortly after the Olympic qualifiers, Gunn was called up to the full national team for the 1999 Southeast Asian Games. He played in two of the Philippines' three matches during the tournament: against Myanmar and Laos.

Gunn featured again for the Philippines during the 2000 Tiger Cup. He played in the first two of the Philippines' three matches but was only used as a substitute. It would be his last international appearance until 2006.

In 2006, he was called up again by the Philippines, now coached by Aris Caslib, for the inaugural AFC Challenge Cup. Again only playing in two of the Philippines' three fixtures; against India and Afghanistan. They failed to advance from the group stage and the two appearances he made would be his last at international level. However, later that year, he would be part of the Philippines squad that was to compete in the 2007 ASEAN Football Championship qualification tournament but was sacked by then coach Aris Caslib one week before the qualifiers for speaking out on the terrible conditions of the training venue and the coaching methods.

On 10 May 2011, it was reported that Gunn would be returning to the national team for the start of their preparations for their 2014 FIFA World Cup qualification first round tie against Sri Lanka. However he would not play in a full international match, with his last outing with the national team being the scrimmage against the Central Philippine University's football team in Barotac Nuevo which ended in a 1–1 draw.

== Coaching career ==
After his retirement, Gunn became a coach under the Philippine Football Federation and is a holder of an FFA C License. He was an assistant coach of the Philippines U23 led by Jim Fraser and team manager Jeff Cheng that played in the 2013 AFC U-22 Championship qualifiers.

== Triathlon ==
After retiring from football, Gunn has shifted focus to triathlon and is aiming to represent the country at the World Championships in Kona, Hawaii.

== Personal life ==
Gunn's mother Viol Noval is from Liloan, Cebu. Gunn is married and has three daughters. By 2020, Gunn has settled back in Australia in Sunshine Coast, Queensland and owns Australia Wide GPS & Radio Installations, a GPS communications company.
