= Neil Jablonski =

Scottish footballer (born 1983)

Personal information
- Date of birth: 9 March 1983 (age 43)
- Place of birth: Glenrothes, Scotland
- Position: Striker

Senior career*
Years	Team	Apps	(Gls)
2002–2005	Dundee	20	(0)
2003	→ Brechin City (loan)	15	(1)
2005–2006	Raith Rovers	40	(7)
2006–2007	East Fife	35	(10)
2008	Sutherland Sharks	18	(2)
2008–2009	Glenrothes		
2009–2010	Sutherland Sharks	29	(7)
2011–2017	Hakoah Sydney City East	125	(72)
2018	Stanmore Hawks	7	(5)
- * Club domestic league appearances and goals

Neil Jablonski (born 9 March 1983) is a Scottish retired professional footballer who played as a midfielder. Having started in Scotland, he went on to spend most of his career in Australia.

== Career ==
Jablonski began his career with Dundee, making his debut in August 2002 as a substitute, aged 19. Featuring once more in the 2002–03 season, he played in the opening day win the following season but then moved on loan to Brechin City for four months. At Brechin he scored his first career goal in a game against Clyde. He returned to Dundee in January 2004 and played around a dozen games throughout the rest of that season. A fractured wrist in September 2004 ruled him out for six weeks, although he returned in mid October as a late substitute. Two further games followed in the remainder of 2004 before a January 2005 move to Gretna seemed likely; in fact, he joined Raith Rovers instead on a free transfer. Featuring in twelve games in the remainder of the season, Jablonski stayed with Raith as they were relegated to the Second Division, featuring regularly in the 2005-06 season as they failed to gain promotion at the first attempt. In May 2006, Jablonski dropped down to the Third Division with East Fife, featuring prominently in the first few months. After seeming set to leave the club in January 2007 to go travelling in Australia, Jablonski committed himself for the remainder of the season, going on to score ten goals and being nominated for Third Division Player of the Year.

As expected, Jablonksi left East Fife at the end of the season and spent the summer months doing coaching work in the United States before heading to Australia, joining New South Wales side Sutherland Sharks. A year later, in late October 2008, Jablonski returned temporarily to Scotland, signing for hometown junior club Glenrothes, spending three months with the Fife side before returning to Australia in January 2009. Jablonksi combines playing duties with working for Mark Robertson's Soccer Skills Coaching Academy. He is currently the captain of newly promoted NSW PL1 side Hakoah Sydney City East FC.

== Honours ==
Sutherland Sharks

- NSW Premier Championship: 2008
