= Robert Younis =

Australian soccer player (born 1985)

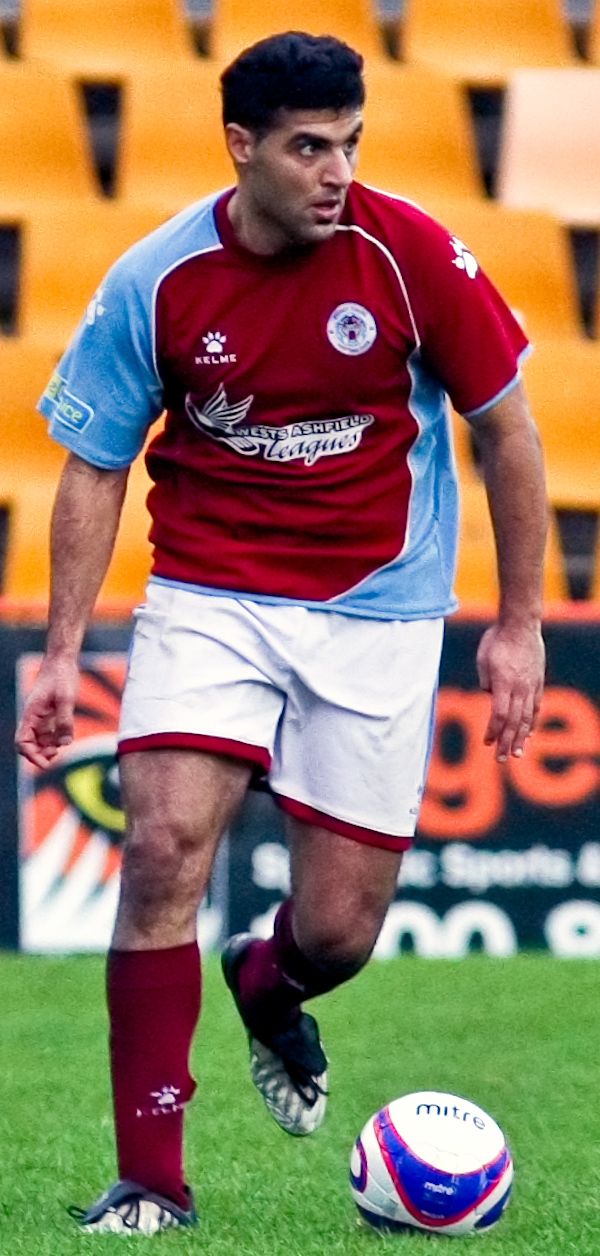
- Younis with APIA Leichhardt in 2009

Personal information
- Full name: Robert Younis
- Date of birth: 14 August 1985 (age 41)
- Place of birth: Sydney, Australia
- Height: 1.86 m (6 ft 1 in)
- Position: Striker

Youth career
- Bankstown City Lions
- Parramatta Power

Senior career*
Years	Team	Apps	(Gls)
2004–2005	APIA Leichhardt		
2006	Fairfield City Lions		
2007–2008	APIA Leichhardt	43	(39)
2008–2009	Adelaide United	12	(0)
2009–2012	APIA Leichhardt	49	(29)
2012–2016	Bonnyrigg White Eagles	116	(82)
- * Club domestic league appearances and goals

Robert Younis (born 14 August 1985) is an Australian former footballer who played as a striker for Bonnyrigg White Eagles FC and APIA Leichhardt in the NSW Premier League, and Adelaide United in the A-League. He retired in 2017.

== Club career ==
Younis signed for A-League side Adelaide United in 2008 after two seasons for APIA Leichhardt in the NSW Premier League which saw him net 38 goals in 43 appearances. Robert came on as a substitute against Perth Glory and made an immediate impact win an assist.

Younis was released from Adelaide United in April 2009 by mutual consent, re-signing with former club APIA Leichhardt for the 2009 NSW Premier League season. In the 2010 season, he scored 16 goals.

Younis signed for the Bonnyrigg White Eagles for the 2012 NSWPL season, during which time they became Premiers. They also reached the semi-finals in 2014.

== Personal life ==
Born in Australia, Younis is of Lebanese descent. His brother, Ray, is a former National Soccer League player who works as the Western Sydney Wanderers's conditioning coach. His niblings, Marcus and Talia, are both professional footballers.

== Career statistics ==
As of 22 December 2008

Club	Season	League			National cup		Continental		Other		Total	
Club	Season	Division	Apps	Goals	Apps	Goals	Apps	Goals	Apps	Goals	Apps	Goals
Adelaide United	2008–09	A-League	12	0	—		3 (Note: Appearances in Asian Champions League)	0	2 (Note: Appearances in pre-season cup)	0	17	0
Total			12	0	0	0	3	0	2	0	17	0

== See also ==
- List of association football families
