= Adam Foti =

Australian soccer player

Personal information
- Full name: Adam Foti
- Date of birth: 20 February 1984 (age 42)
- Place of birth: Sydney, Australia
- Height: 1.90 m (6 ft 3 in)
- Position: Striker

Youth career
- Terry Hills
- Belrose Raiders
- Manly-Warringah
- Gladesville-Hornsby
- Northern Tigers

Senior career*
Years	Team	Apps	(Gls)
2001–2003	Northern Spirit	0	(0)
2003	Northern Tigers	13	(11)
2003–2004	Leonidio FC	9	(1)
2004	Northern Tigers	6	(8)
2004–2005	Aris Limassol	23	(7)
2005–2006	AEP Paphos FC	33	(24)
2006–2008	Kerkyra	11	(1)
2008	Olympiakos Nicosia	8	(1)
2009	APIA Leichhardt Tigers		
2010–2012	Manly United	44	(16)
- * Club domestic league appearances and goals as of 31 July 2015

Adam Foti (born 20 February 1984) is a retired Australian football (soccer) striker with an Italian passport who played for several Cypriot and Greek clubs. He began playing football aged six in Junior Clubs Terry Hils/Bellrose Raiders, Manly-Warringah, Gladesville-Hornsby. Aged 15 he signed for Northern Tigers FC, and in seasons 2002 and 2003 he had 19 caps and 19 goals with this club.

His good appearances in Australia were the reason that he came to Leonidio FC Greece aged 19, where he played half of season 2003–04 with nine caps and one goal.

After he moved in Cyprus, for 1.5 years in Aris Limassol and start showing his scoring skills, having 23 caps and seven goals. The next one-and-a-half years he signed for AEP Paphos where in his first season he was the leading scorer in Cypriot League with 18 goals in 23 games and finished half of season 2006–07 in the same club with 10 caps and 6 goals.

January 2007 he came back to Greece and transferred to Kerkyra where he played 13 games and had one goal and finally this December he moved to Cyprus for third time to play for Olympiakos Nicosia (eight games one goal).
