= Scott Balderson =

Australian-born footballer

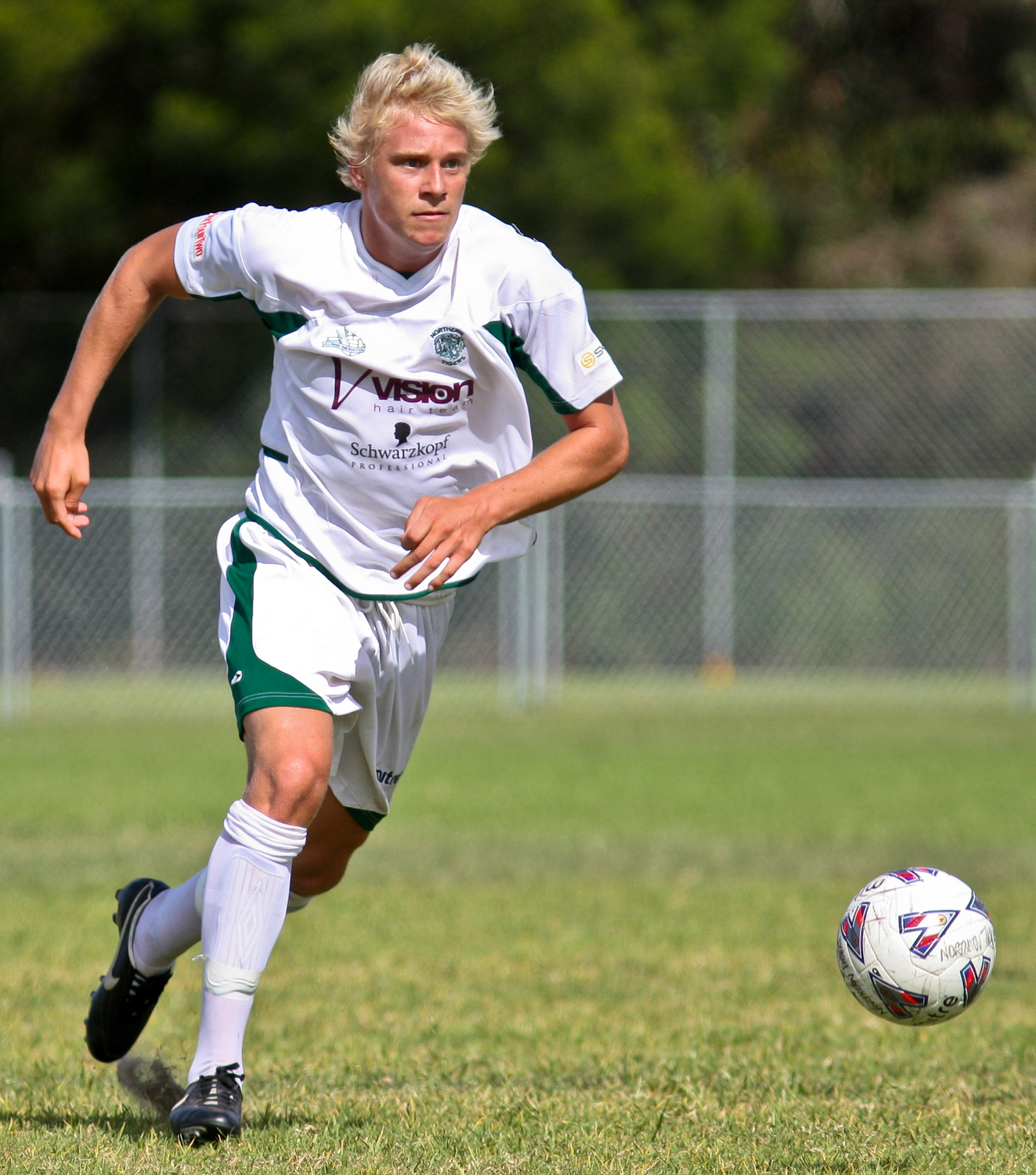

Personal information
- Full name: Scott Balderson
- Date of birth: 18 December 1989 (age 36)
- Place of birth: Sydney, Australia
- Height: 1.77 m (5 ft 9 1/2 in)
- Position: Midfielder

Team information
- Current team: Manly United

Youth career
- Wakehurst SC
- Manly United
- Northern Tigers FC
- 2009–2010: Newcastle Jets

Senior career*
Years	Team	Apps	(Gls)
2007–2008	Stevenage Borough	0	(0)
2008	Bognor Regis		
2008–2009	Hitchin Town		(2)
2009	Northern Tigers FC		
2010	Newcastle Jets	1	(0)
2010–2014	Manly United	76	(15)
2015	Sydney Olympic	19	(2)
2016–2021	Manly United	91	(11)
- * Club domestic league appearances and goals as of 9 November 2021

Scott Balderson (born 18 December 1989) is an Australian-born footballer who lasts played for Manly United FC.

== Career ==
Balderson started playing in Australia, and then signed to English Conference National club Stevenage Borough. He came back to Australia, and now plays for Manly United for the 2017 NSW Premier League season. He played a short time in the A-League for Newcastle Jets.
