= Chris Triantis =

Australian soccer player

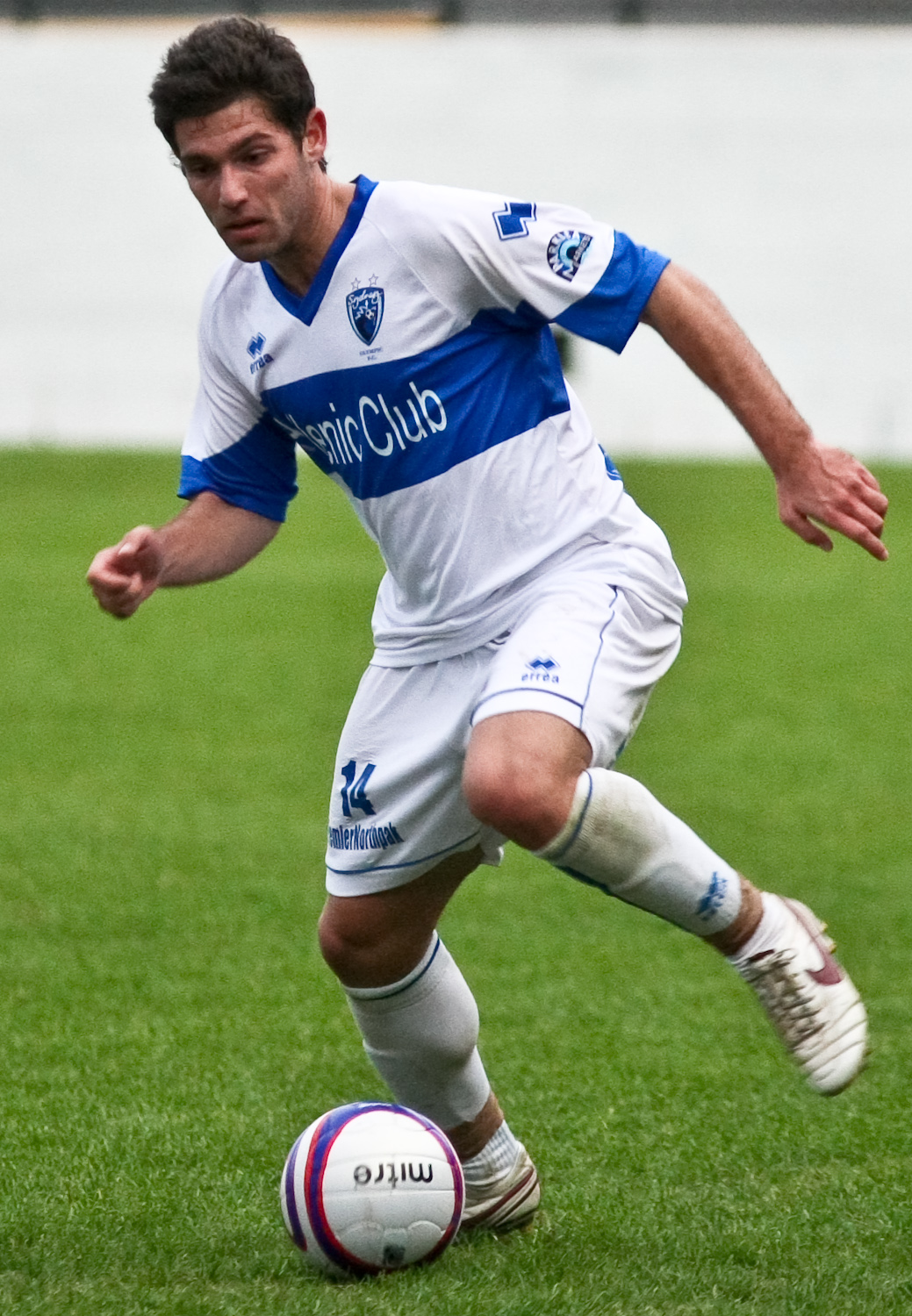
- Triantis playing for Sydney Olympic in 2009

Personal information
- Full name: Chris Triantis
- Date of birth: 12 October 1987 (age 39)
- Place of birth: Sydney, New South Wales, Australia
- Height: 1.78 m (5 ft 10 in)
- Position: Central midfielder

Team information
- Current team: Bankstown City

Youth career
- 1999–2003: Sydney Olympic
- 2003–2005: FC Metz
- 2005–2006: Sydney Olympic

Senior career*
Years	Team	Apps	(Gls)
2007–2012	Sydney Olympic	126	(32)
2009	→ Newcastle Jets (loan)	3	(0)
2013–2015	Sydney United	44	(4)
2016	Sydney Olympic	7	(1)
2018–2019	Gladesville Ryde Magic	41	(12)
2020–	Bankstown City	20	(6)
- * Club domestic league appearances and goals as of 10 November 2021

Chris Triantis (born 12 October 1987) is an Australian soccer player who plays for Bankstown City.

== Early years ==
Born in Sydney, the eldest of ten children, Triantis attended his father's alma mater, Newington College (2002–2004). At 16 he left school and took up a scholarship in France with FC Metz, where he played in the reserves.

== Club career ==
On 22 August 2008 he signed with Sydney FC's inaugural National Youth League side. He captained the side to the 2009 National Youth League championship in 2–0 win against Adelaide United. However, he was unable to stay with the youth side due to being overage for the next season.

On 10 March 2009 he returned to his previous club Sydney Olympic FC.

On 7 August 2009 he was signed by the Newcastle Jets. He was given a shock starting berth for the Jets opening game of the 2009–2010 season, given that he had not made any senior A-League appearances previously, and had only been signed the day before the game. On 26 July 2010 Triantis made his first appearance for English club Oxford United as a trialist. He played against Brackley Town and lost 1–0 with the team.

In 2012, Triantis the talented number 10 was crowned the 2012 Gold Medal winner at the official Gold Medal Dinner awards described as a "lavish affair for the NSW Premier League and NSW’s top tier competition".

Triantis signed for Sydney United 58 under Coach Mark Rudan for the 2013 NSW Priemer League Season

In 2013, Triantis suffered an ACL injury to his right knee resulting in a season-ending injury.

== Honours ==
With Sydney FC:

- National Youth League Championship: 2008–2009
- NSW Premier League Gold Medal Winner 2012
