= Brendan Gan =

Malaysian footballer

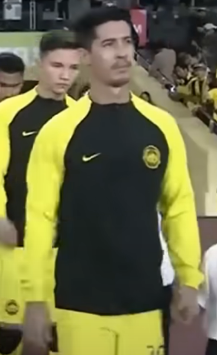
- Brendan playing for Malaysia in 2023

Personal information
- Full name: Brendan Gan Seng Ling
- Date of birth: 3 June 1988 (age 38)
- Place of birth: Sutherland, Australia
- Height: 1.80 m (5 ft 11 in)
- Position: Midfielder

Team information
- Current team: Sutherland Sharks

Youth career
- –1999: Marton Hammers
- 2000–2007: Sutherland Sharks
- 2008–2009: Sydney FC

Senior career*
Years	Team	Apps	(Gls)
2008	Sutherland Sharks	15	(6)
2008–2011	Sydney FC	38	(5)
2011	Bonnyrigg White Eagles	9	(2)
2012	Sabah	19	(2)
2013	Rockdale City Suns	22	(3)
2014–2016	Kelantan	31	(0)
2018–2019	Perak	28	(5)
2020–2023	Selangor	60	(12)
2024–2025	Kuala Lumpur City	16	(2)
2025–	Sutherland Sharks	23	(0)

International career^{‡}
2014	Malaysia U23	5	(0)
2016–2024	Malaysia	38	(1)
Medal record
Men's football
Representing Malaysia
King's Cup
Runner-up	2022
- * Club domestic league appearances and goals as of 5 June 2026 ‡ National team caps and goals as of 26 March 2024

Brendan Gan Seng Ling (simplified Chinese: 颜兴龙; traditional Chinese: 顏興龍; pinyin: Yán Xìng Lóng; born 3 June 1988) is a professional footballer who plays as a midfielder for National Premier Leagues NSW club Sutherland Sharks. Born in Australia, he plays for the Malaysia national team.

== Club career ==
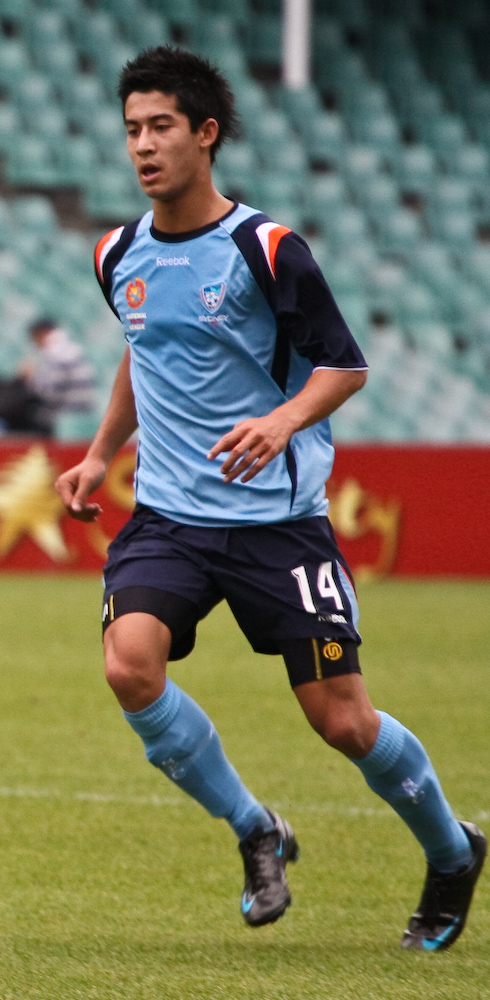
Brendan with Sydney FC in 2008.

Gan began playing football for his local club, Marton Hammers before signing for the Sutherland Sharks in 2000 when he was twelve years old, progressing through their youth grades to make his senior debut for the club in 2008. He made 15 league appearances scoring 6 goals, and 3 appearances in the Finals Series. It was this debut season that shot Gan to prominence within the local media which brought with it a growing reputation to match. His performances eventually led to his being crowned the New South Wales Premier League player of the year, winning the Gold Medal award for the competition.

=== Sydney FC ===
Gan was than signed by Sydney FC for their inaugural National Youth League squad ahead of competition from rival A-League clubs. On 28 November 2008, he made his debut for Sydney FC against Queensland Roar with a 5-minute cameo where he turned heads. On 7 December, he scored the winning goal in the 78th minute for Sydney FC against Newcastle Jets to give them their first win in 7 games.

Gan was given his full senior debut on 13 December against the Central Coast Mariners. He scored his second senior goal against Melbourne Victory with a long range strike from outside the penalty area. Brendan scored his third senior goal against Wellington Phoenix with a powerful header from a corner. This goal gave Sydney FC a 2–0 win over Wellington and placed them on the top of the table, leapfrogging Gold Coast United. On 2 December 2010, in only his second start for the season, he scored the opening goal in a 3–1 win, once again against Wellington Phoenix. He was released from Sydney, along with several other players at the end of Sydney's 2011 AFC Champions League campaign.

=== Bonnyrigg White Eagles ===
Gan signed for Bonnyrigg White Eagles in the NSW Premier League, and made his debut in the Round 15 game against Sydney United.

=== Sabah FA ===
On 17 November 2011, Gan moved to Malaysian club, Sabah as one of the two foreign players allowed in the 2012 Malaysia Super League. Brendan, alongside his fellow countrymen, Michael Baird signed a one-year contract with Sabah.

=== Rockdale City Suns ===
In January 2013, he returned home to signed with NSW Premier League side Rockdale City Suns.

=== Kelantan FA ===
In November 2013, Gan returned to Malaysia and signed a three-year contract with Malaysia Super League club Kelantan ahead of the 2014 season. He was supposed to be registered as a local player for Kelantan but did not get the approval from FAM because according to FAM, any player to be registered as a local player is required to have Malaysian identity card or passport. On 6 April, he officially obtained an identity card as a Malaysian and was registered by Kelantan as a local player during the April 2014 transfer window.

Gan made his debut during the match between Kelantan against Terengganu which ended 1–1. In the first match of the 2015 Malaysia Super League, Gan suffered a serious torn ACL in his right knee that would keep him out for most of the 2015 season. In September 2016, Brendan suffered another ACL injury, this time in his left knee which keep him out for 10 months, ruling him out for the 2016 AFF Championship where he was released by the club at the end of 2016.

=== Perak FA ===
After making his recovery from a long term ACL injury, On 15 December 2017, Gan signed with Perak. On 24 February 2018, Gan played his first football match in over a year during a league match against Pahang FA. He would than played in the club 2019 AFC Champions League preliminary round 2 match against Hong Kong club, Kitchee where he played the entire 120th minute helping the club to progress to the final play-off round against Korean Ulsan Hyundai. On 8 February 2019, he scored his first goal for the club in a 1–1 draw against Kedah FA.

=== Selangor ===
On 1 December 2019, Gan officially joined Malaysia Super League club Selangor. In July 2021, Gan was diagnosed with testicular cancer and missed the rest of season. In June 2022, he made his return in a 7–0 over Sarawak United, scoring a brace. He was appointed as Selangor's captain since 2021. At the end of the 2023 Malaysia Super League season, Selangor confirmed Gan's departure with them after spending four seasons together.

=== Kuala Lumpur City ===
On 1 April 2024, Gan signed for rivals club Kuala Lumpur City. He scored his first goal on 21 June in a 3–0 away league win against Negeri Sembilan. On 26 September 2024, during the 2024–25 ASEAN Club Championship group stage match against Indonesian club Borneo Samarinda, Gan scored the only goal in the match to secure all 3 points.

=== Sutherland Sharks ===
After spending nearly eleven years in Malaysia, on 15 July 2025, Brendan returned to Australian to signed with hometown club Sutherland Sharks which competes in the National Premier Leagues NSW

== International career ==
=== Youth ===
Gan made his first appearances with Malaysia as an overage player with the Malaysia U23 team against Yemen U23 in a preparation for the 2014 Asian Games.

=== Senior ===
Gan later debuted for Malaysia national team on 24 March 2016 in a 2018 FIFA World Cup qualification match against Saudi Arabia. He scored his first international goal on 14 July 2019 in a 2–1 victory over Thailand during the 2022 FIFA World Cup qualification match.

Gan was called up to the Malaysia's squad for the 2022 AFF Championship where he played in all of the six matches for Malaysia.

In January 2024, Gan was called up by head coach Kim Pan-gon to the Malaysia's squad for the 2023 AFC Asian Cup. He make his debut in the tournament playing the entire match in the last group stage fixtures in a 3–3 draw to South Korea on 25 January.

== Personal life ==
Gan was born in Australia to an Australian mother and Malaysian Chinese father from Seremban, Negeri Sembilan.

== Career statistics ==
=== Club statistics ===
As of match played 1 July 2025.

Club performance			League		Cup		League Cup		Other		Total	
Season	Club	League	Apps	Goals	Apps	Goals	Apps	Goals	Apps	Goals	Apps	Goals
Australia			League		Cup		Other		Asia		Total	
2008	Sutherland Sharks	NSW Premier League	15	6	3	0	–				18	6
Total			15	6	3	0	–				18	6
2008–09	Sydney FC	A-League	9	2	–						9	2
2009–10	Sydney FC	A-League	19	1	3	0	–				22	1
2010–11	Sydney FC	A-League	10	2	–				0	0	10	2
2011–12	Sydney FC	A-League	0	0	–						0	0
Total			38	5	3	0	–		0	0	41	5
2011	Bonnyrigg White Eagles	NSW Premier League	9	2	1	0	–				10	2
Malaysia			League		FA Cup		Malaysia Cup		Other		Total	
2012	Sabah	Malaysia Super League	19	2	1	0	–		1	0	21	2
Australia			League		Cup		Other		Asia		Total	
2013	Rockdale City Suns	National Premier Leagues	22	3	4	0	–				26	3
Malaysia			League		FA Cup		Malaysia Cup		Asia		Total	
2014	Kelantan	Malaysia Super League	13	0	2	0	8	0	–		23	0
2015	Kelantan	Malaysia Super League	1	0	0	0	0	0	–		1	0
2016	Kelantan	Malaysia Super League	17	0	1	0	5	0	–		23	0
Total			31	0	3	0	13	0	–		47	0
2018	Perak	Malaysia Super League	12	1	1	0	10	1	–		23	2
2019	Perak	Malaysia Super League	16	4	5	1	8	2	1	0	30	7
Total			28	5	6	1	18	3	1	0	53	9
2020	Selangor	Malaysia Super League	10	4	0	0	1	0	–		11	4
2021	Selangor	Malaysia Super League	11	0	–		0	0	–		11	0
2022	Selangor	Malaysia Super League	16	5	3	0	7	0	–		26	5
2023	Selangor	Malaysia Super League	23	3	2	1	4	0	–		29	4
Total			60	12	5	1	12	0	–		77	13
2024–25	Kuala Lumpur City	Malaysia Super League	16	2	1	0	4	1	2 (Note: Appearances in ASEAN Club Championship)	1	23	4
Career total			234	37	27	2	43	3	2	0	306	42

=== International ===
As of match played 26 March 2024

Malaysia national team
Year	Apps	Goals
2016	7	0
2019	8	1
2021	5	0
2022	4	0
2023	6	0
2024	7	0
Total	37	1

==== International goals ====
As of match played 14 November 2019. Malaysia score listed first, score column indicates score after each Brendan goal.

International goals by date, venue, cap, opponent, score, result and competition
No.	Date	Venue	Cap	Opponent	Score	Result	Competition
1	14 November 2019	Bukit Jalil National Stadium, Bukit Jalil, Malaysia	14	Thailand	1–1	2–1	2022 FIFA World Cup qualification

== Honours ==
=== Club ===
Perak

- Malaysia Cup: 2018
- Malaysia FA Cup runner-up :2019
- Malaysia Charity Shield Runner-up: 2019

Sydney FC

- A-League Premiership: 2009–10
- A-League Championship: 2009–10

Selangor

- Malaysia Cup runner-up: 2022

=== International ===
Malaysia

- King's Cup runner-up: 2022

Individual

- Malaysia Cup Most Valuable Player : 2018
- Malaysia Super League Team of the Season: 2019
