= Luka Glavas =

Australian soccer player

Personal information
- Full name: Luka Glavas
- Date of birth: 20 January 1985 (age 41)
- Place of birth: Sydney, New South Wales, Australia
- Height: 6 ft 1 in (1.85 m)
- Position: Striker

Youth career
- 2003–2004: Sydney United

Senior career*
Years	Team	Apps	(Gls)
2003–2004	Hurstville ZFC	32	(22)
2004–2005	Melbourne Knights	9	(3)
2005–2006	Sydney United	9	(12)
2006–2007	Perth Glory	15	(2)
2007	Sydney FC	0	(0)
2007	Heidelberg United	13	(2)
2008–2014	Sydney United	120	(70)
- * Club domestic league appearances and goals as of 17.9.14 ‡ National team caps and goals as of 00:34, 12 July 2007 (UTC)

Luka Glavas (Croatian: Luka Glavaš; born 20 January 1985) is a former Australian footballer.

== Biography ==
Luka Glavas played for Hurstville Zagreb from 2003 to 2004, Melbourne Knights from 2004 to 2005 and Sydney United from 2005 to 2006. In the 2006 NSW Premier League Grand Final against Blacktown City Demons, Glavas scored all four goals in a 4–0 win for Sydney United.

Glavas then joined Perth Glory in mid-2006. Glavas scored his first ever A-League goal against Sydney FC on 29 October 2006. However, he was generally disappointing during his time at Perth Glory. At the end of the 2006–2007 A-League season, Perth advised Glavas that he was one of five players to be released by the club.

On 13 February 2007, Sydney FC announced Glavas had signed with the club and was included in the squad for the AFC Champions League 2007.

Glavas was released by Sydney at the completion of their ACL campaign and signed with Heidelberg United in the Victorian Premier League.

In 2008 Glavas returned to Sydney United and returned to goalscoring form in the NSW Premier League. Glavas was Sydney United's top goalscorer in 2008, 2009, 2011, 2012 and 2013.

The talismanic striker retired on 24 August 2014, playing his last match against Sutherland Sharks in the last round of the 2014 National Premier Leagues NSW.
