= Robert Cattanach =

Australian professional footballer

Personal information
- Full name: Robert Cattanach
- Date of birth: 10 September 1984 (age 42)
- Place of birth: Canberra, Australia
- Position: Striker

Team information
- Current team: Canberra Olympic
- Number: 10

Youth career
- ACTAS

Senior career*
Years	Team	Apps	(Gls)
2003	Canberra Olympic	11	(3)
2004	Canberra City	7	(5)
2005	South Melbourne	11	(3)
2007–2008	Sydney FC	1	(0)
2008–2011	Manly United		
2012–2014	Cooma FC	45	(33)
2015–2019	Canberra Olympic	56	(25)
- * Club domestic league appearances and goals as of 12 September 2017

Robert "Robbie" Cattanach is an Australian professional footballer who plays for Canberra Olympic.
