= Bonnyrigg Sports Club =

Events & Sports venue in Bonnyrigg, New South Wales

Bonnyrigg Sports Ground
- Interactive map of Bonnyrigg Sports Ground
- Former names: Avala Sports Club
- Location: 610–618 Elizabeth Dr, Bonnyrigg, New South Wales, 2177, Australia
- Coordinates: 33°53′20″S 150°52′21″E
- Capacity: 10,000
- Surface: Grass

Construction
- Groundbreaking: 1966
- Opened: 1979
- Renovated: 1986
- Expanded: 2001

Tenant
- Bonnyrigg White Eagles Football Club

Bonnyrigg Sports Club is the home of the Bonnyrigg White Eagles football (soccer) club in Bonnyrigg, New South Wales, Australia.

The ground has played host to some notable matches over the years but none more so than the friendly clash between the Bonnyrigg White Eagles and the high-profile 1991 European Cup Champions Red Star Belgrade, who were in Australia on a mid-season break in January 2001.

== History ==
The ground dates back to May 1966, when 7 acres (28,000 m^{2}) of land was purchased for the building of a social club and football grounds. Over the years the grounds and club itself were improved when in 1986 it became the permanent home ground for the Avala Sports Club (which would become the Bonnyrigg White Eagles in 1993).

In 2001, an additional 3 acres (12,000 m^{2}) of land was purchased as part of a plan to renovate the club and expand the training grounds. This was completed in October 2005.
