= Manly United FC =

Manly United
- Full name: Manly United Football Club
- Nickname: Manly
- Founded: 2004
- Ground: Cromer Park
- Capacity: 5,000
- Chairman: Ray Fanning
- Coach: Vladimir Knesevic
- League: NPL NSW
- 2026: 5th of 16
- Website: http://www.manlyunitedfc.com.au/
Home colours	Away colours

Manly United Football Club is an Australian soccer club based in the Northern Beaches area of Sydney. The club competes in the National Premier Leagues NSW and their home ground is Cromer Park, in the suburb of Dee Why, approximately 15 minutes away from Manly.

Its main grandstand is named after former Socceroo captain Lucas Neill, who played for the club as a junior before playing overseas at Blackburn Rovers and West Ham United.

Manly United Football Club Ltd. was officially formed in 2004 by the Manly Warringah Soccer Association. However, there have been many representative teams competing for the association prior to this date. Notably, the previous club was called Manly Warringah Dolphins, that formed from the merger of Manly-North Shore United and Warringah Freshwater at the close of the 1991 NSW Division 1 season for the start of the upcoming 1992 NSW Super League season.

== History ==
=== Neerlandia / Manly Warringah ===
A Dutch club called Neerlandia competed in the 1959 Sydney Federation Division Two, won the premiership and gained entry into the Sydney Federation Division One for 1960.

The club changed its name to Manly Warringah from 1960. The side had spent 14 seasons throughout the New South Wales top flight in 1960, 1968, and from 1976 to 1987 before being relegated to Division Two. With the club struggling, it merged with North Shore United in 1991. North Shore United itself was a merger of two clubs Ku-Ring-Gai and North Sydney-Artarmon (for the 1989 season). The Manly-North Shore United merger dissolved after the 1991 NSW Division One season, with Manly merging with Warringah Freshwater. North Shore United would continue to send representative teams to tournaments as Ku-Ring-Gai Districts.

=== Warringah Freshwater ===
Warringah Narrabeen (and from 1986 Warringah Freshwater) was a club that had competed throughout the early 1980s in NSW Division Two, even winning the title in 1983. With promotion in 1984 to NSW Division One, the club maintained mid-lower half of the table across their eight-year sojourn in the top flight. Their highest place finish was 5th, achieved in 1991 before merging with Manly for the newly revamped "NSW Super League" in 1992.

=== Manly Warringah Dolphins ===
The merger of Manly-North Shore United and Warringah Freshwater created the Manly Warringah Dolphins at the close of the 1991 NSW Division 1 season for the start of the upcoming NSW Super League season. The club had gained promotion into the NSW Premier League for the start of the 2004–05 season. At the time, the club was operating solely as a representative branch for the Manly Warringah Soccer Association (MWSA). However, it was a requirement from Soccer NSW that all Federation Clubs be a separate incorporated body and so Manly United Football Club Ltd. was formed.

=== Manly United (2004–present) ===
Manly United have competed in the NSW Tier 1 since 2004–05 when they were elevated to the NSW Premier League after winning the Super League Division.

The original Logo of the renamed Manly United Football Club in 2004 was a collective of an Osprey sea bird, a Football & a Dolphin joined as one, these three icons represent the local MWFA Association (Osprey), a Football & Manly Warringah Dolphins (Dolphin). The Club again changed its logo in 2016 to reflect the evolution of Manly United Football Club and its ownership and association with Manly Warringah Football Association.

The club is closely associated with the Manly Warringah Football Association (MWFA), the largest community Football Association in Australia with more than 20,000 players.

=== Divisional History ===
- 2004–2012: NSW Premier League (NSW Tier 1)
- 2013–present: National Premier Leagues NSW (NSW Tier 1)

==== Manly Warringah Dolphins ====
- 1992–1996: Super League (NSW Tier 1)
- 1997–1999: Division One (NSW Tier 2)
- 2000: Super League (NSW Tier 1)
- 2001–2004: Winter Super League (NSW Tier 2)

== Lucas Neill Scholarship and Medal ==
Between 2006 and 2012 ex-Manly junior Lucas Neill helped provide opportunities for up and coming footballers from his junior club. Each year the scholarship was awarded to a different young player from Manly to trial in Europe.

Year	Recipient
2006	Chris Payne
2007	Simon Beer
2008	Joey Gibbs
2009	Leigh Egger
2010	Tonu Liiband
2011	Jack Green
2012	Thomas Manos

Due to a number of factors including difficulty getting clubs in Europe to provide the opportunity for the players, the scheme was discontinued as Lucas and his advisors looked for a different way to reward the junior players from his junior club.

In 2014 the scholarship was re-branded the Lucas Neill Medal and was extended to include ALL junior members of the club, it was determined that there should be two medals awarded each year, in recognition of the advancements in ladies football. The medal is made from Sterling silver and is laser engraved on the front with a photograph of Lucas when he first became captain of Australia in 2007.

Year	Male Recipient	Female Recipient
2014	Jake Hollman	Remy Siemsen
2015	Tom Fay	Remy Siemsen
2016	Ben Koop	Ruby Whitaker
2017	Harry McCarthy	Holly Newman
2018	Jordan Devries	Kahli Johnson
2019	Yannis Frerck	Kahli Johnson
2020	Eric Sequeira	Hailey Chappelow
2021	Toby Bakewell	Valentina Bradley
2022	Jasper Chipman	Alice Thompson
2023	Jasper Swadling	Sienna Dale
2024	Will McCreery	MacKenzie Jeffs
2025	Doug John	Chelsea McCredie
2026	Charlie Coles	Erin Dunne

== Current Men's squad ==
As of 28 March, 2026

Note: Flags indicate national team as defined under FIFA eligibility rules; some limited exceptions apply. Players may hold more than one non-FIFA nationality.

No.	Pos.	Nation	Player
1	GK	AUS	Sam Benton
2	DF	AUS	Luka Krizan
3	DF	AUS	Matthew O’Donoghue
4	DF	AUS	Jesse Piriz
5	DF	IRL	Aaron O'Driscoll
6	MF	AUS	Saxon Hillyer
7	FW	MRI	Stephan de Robillard
8	MF	JPN	Kakeru Ono
9	FW	AUS	Ben Koop
10	MF	AUS	Darcy Burgess
11	MF	JPN	Ayumu Kimura
12	DF	AUS	Mitchell Seaman
14	MF	AUS	Max Walker

No.	Pos.	Nation	Player
15	DF	AUS	Max Martinello
16	MF	AUS	William Faulder
17	FW	AUS	Samuel Griffiths
18	MF	AUS	Luke Nieuwenhof
19	MF	AUS	Cai Evans
24	MF	USA	Toby Bakewell
26	DF	AUS	Yannis Frerck
29	MF	AUS	Aston Hulme
33	DF	AUS	Jasper Chipman
34	MF	AUS	Jared Muir
36	DF	AUS	Lewis Morsella
37	FW	AUS	Hamish Purdy
99	GK	AUS	Mackenzie Syron

== Men's Seasons ==
Season	League										Waratah Cup	FFA Cup	Top scorer	
Season	Div	Pld	W	D	L	GF	GA	Pts	Pos	Finals	Waratah Cup	FFA Cup	Player(s)	Goals
2004–05	NSW Premier League	22	7	7	8	33	29	28	11th	–	4R			
2006	NSW Premier League	18	8	4	6	31	24	28	5th	–	4R			
2007	NSW Premier League	18	8	4	6	26	21	28	4th	PF	RU			
2008	NSW Premier League	22	12	3	7	42	21	39	4th	SF	4R			
2009	NSW Premier League	22	10	7	5	33	22	37	5th	SF	RU			
2010	NSW Premier League	22	7	4	11	24	31	25	9th	–	QF			
2011	NSW Premier League	22	8	7	7	33	37	31	6th	–	W			
2012	NSW Premier League	22	6	5	11	26	33	23	10th	–	3R			
2013	NPL NSW	22	6	8	8	34	35	26	8th	–	4R			
2014	NPL NSW	22	7	3	12	31	46	24	10th	–	RU	R32		
2015	NPL NSW	22	8	3	11	39	38	27	8th	–	6R			
2016	NPL NSW	22	12	7	3	58	26	43	3rd	SF	RU	R32		
2017	NPL NSW	22	13	3	6	47	36	42	4th	W	4R			
2018	NPL NSW	22	7	7	8	33	32	28	8th	–	5R			
2019	NPL NSW	22	7	5	10	25	34	26	9th	–	SF	R16		
2020	NPL NSW	11	3	3	5	14	18	12	8th	–	cancelled			

= Premiers (premiership positions) or Champions (finals series)
= Runners-up (premiership or finals series)
PR = Preliminary Round
1R, 2R, 3R...7R = 1st Round, 2nd Round, 3rd Round...7th Round
R32 = Round of 32
R16 = Round of 16
QF = Quarter-final
SF = Semi-final
EF = Elimination Final
PF = Preliminary Final
PO = Playoff Final

== Men's Honours ==
- National Premier Leagues NSW

Men's Club Champions (1): 2016

- National Premier Leagues NSW Grand Finals

Champions (1): 2017
Runners Up (1): 2022

- Waratah Cup:

Champions (1): 2011
Runners-up (4): 2007, 2009, 2014, 2016

=== Manly Warringah Dolphins (1992–2004) ===
- National Premier Leagues NSW (Tier 1)

Premiers (1): 1995
Runners-Up (1): 1992

- National Premier Leagues NSW Grand Finals

Champions (1): 1995,
Runners-Up (0):

- NSW Super League (Tier 2)

Premiers (1): 2004
Runners-Up (1): 2002

- NSW Super League Grand Finals

Champions (1): 2001
Runners-Up (2): 1994, 2004
