= Cromer Park =

Soccer stadium in Sydney, Australia

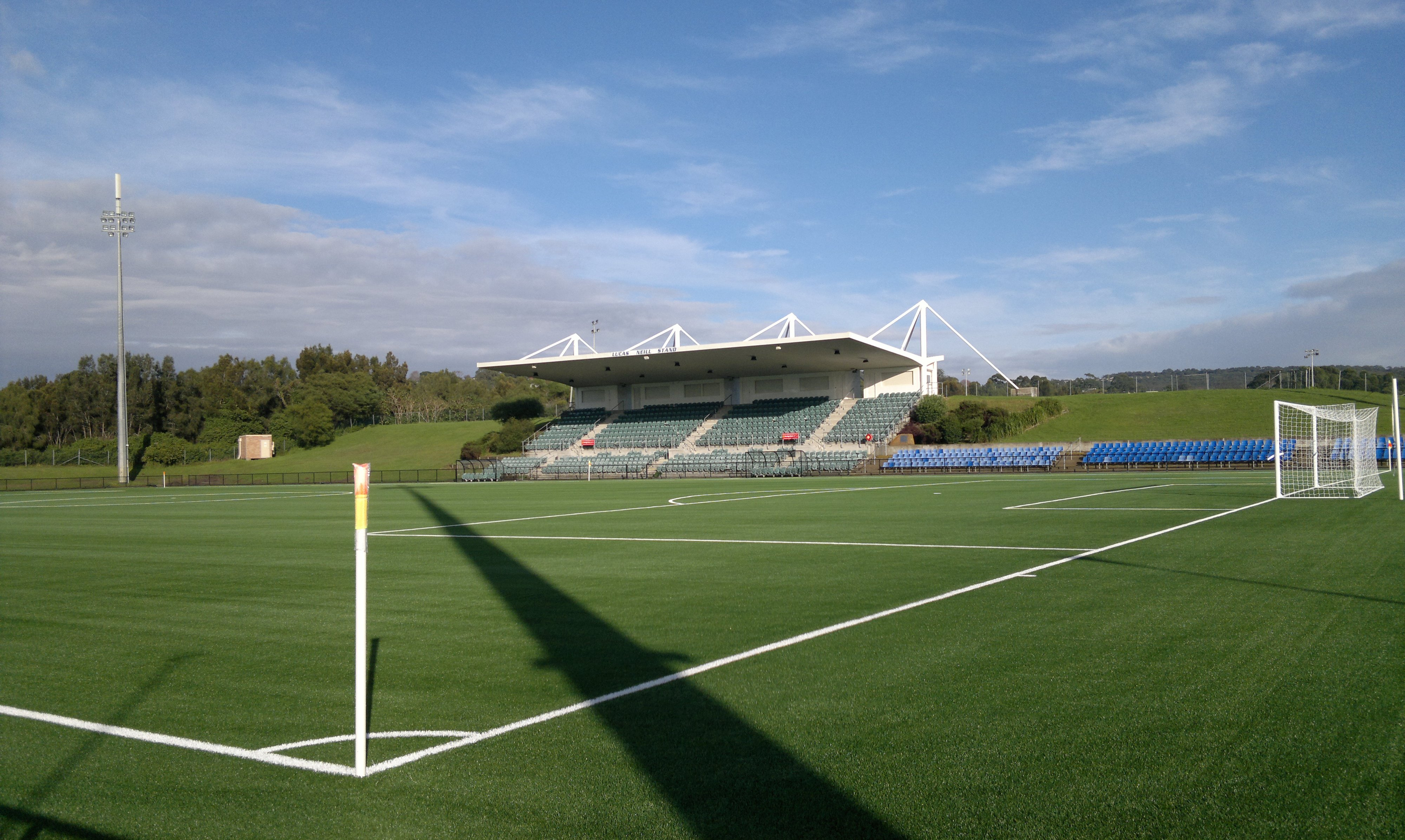
- Interactive map of Cromer Park
- Full name: Cromer Park
- Location: Cromer, Sydney, New South Wales
- Coordinates: 33°44′24″S 151°17′9″E
- Owner: Northern Beaches Council
- Capacity: 5,000
- Surface: Field Turf Revolution Synthetic grass (Field 1 and Polytan Field 2

Construction
- Built: lights (2001), grandstand (2004), perimeter seating (2010), synthetic field (2012)
- Opened: Synthetic surface officially opened 1 July 2012

Tenant
- Manly United

Cromer Park is a community soccer ground located in the Northern Beaches suburb of Cromer in Sydney. It is home to Manly United FC and Manly Warringah Football Association.

== History ==
In 1969, the area was selected to be the site of Cromer High School, but was found to be too swampy.

The Park was first developed in the 1970s.

== Structure and facilities ==
The stadium has a 900-seat grandstand named after Lucas Neill the 50th captain of the Socceroos and ex Blackburn Rovers FC & West Ham United player. Neill played for Manly United FC as a junior, before moving overseas. The Lucas Neill Stand is situated on the western side of the field together with another 800 seats around the perimeter. There are change rooms, toilets and canteen facilities located on the northern side. Adjacent to Cromer Park on the eastern side is the Manly Warringah Football's licensed clubhouse called the "Far Post" and administration office of Manly Warringah Football Association and Manly United FC.

The playing surface was upgraded to a generation 4 synthetic surface, manufactured by Field Turf. completed in June 2012. The synthetic surface had a mixture of cryogenic rubber and sand infill. The playing field dimensions are 76m x 125m with line marking 68m x 110m making it at the time the largest synthetic football field in Australia. The field was again re-laid in 2022 by Polytan using an infill of cork and coconut husk mixture, the playing size was also reduced to 68m x 105m to meet FIFA international standards. In early 2018 Cromer Park No. 2 was re-opened as a second Synthetic pitch and installed by Polytan. In 2022 a new updated clubhouse/bistro was opened to complement the complex..

Stormwater harvesting was integrated into the design of the synthetic field to irrigate fields 3, 4 and 5 at Cromer Park.

== Transport ==
Cromer Park is accessible by Sydney Bus routes 179, 180 and 180X.
