= John Crehan Park =

Multi-use stadium in Australia

Coordinates: 34°28′03″S 150°52′05″E

John Crehan Park is a multi-use stadium in the southern part of Wollongong, Australia. The stadium is on Merret Avenue, Cringila. It is currently used mostly for football matches. It is the home of New South Wales Premier League side Wollongong FC and Illawarra Premier League side Cringila Lions FC. It was once the temporary home ground of the Rockdale Ilinden Football Club as their regular home ground was disrupted by near-by construction. The stadium includes one stand on one long side and a small function room behind one goal. There is also a second ground.

The stadium holds 7,500 people.

== See also ==
- List of sports venues named after individuals
