= Bonnyrigg White Eagles FC =

- Full name: Bonnyrigg White Eagles FC
- Nickname: Avala
- Founded: 1968
- Ground: Bonnyrigg Sports Club, Bonnyrigg
- Capacity: 10,000
- Chairman: unknown
- Head Coach: Ratko Lovrić
- League: NSW League Two
- 2025: 15th of 16 (Relegated via playoff) NSW League One
- Website: bwefc.com.au
Home colours	Away colours

Bonnyrigg White Eagles FC is an Australian semi-professional soccer club based in Bonnyrigg, Sydney, New South Wales, currently playing in the NSW League One. The club was founded in 1968 as Avala Sports Club and took its current name in 1992.

== History ==
Established by Serbian immigrants from the Cabramatta area of south-west Sydney. Its most famous products are former Socceroo Milan Blagojević, current Socceroos Miloš Degenek and Danny Vuković, as well as Young Socceroo and former Melbourne Heart defender David Vranković. Misha Radovic was Red Star player for 13 years and also Champion of Europe with Yugoslavia U19 in 1979. Aleksandar Janković was manager of Red Star Belgrade twice. Former Brisbane Roar defender Milan Susak played a major role in Ange Postecoglou's Premiership and Championship winning side.

The club was originally known as Riverside Rapid and played in the Marickville area, before renaming as Riverside Avala and relocating to Lansvale in 1976. The following year they dropped the "Riverside" name and were promoted to the First Division of the NSW State League as Avala.

The club was established in 1968 as the Avala Sports Club, named after the Avala mountain in Serbia. In 1977, Avala was promoted to the New South Wales Premier League and competed in the top level of New South Wales soccer until 1986.

After a two-year absence from the New South Wales Premier League which included a New South Wales Winter Super League Premiership-Championship double in 1988, Avala's strong performances in the State Leagues and their strong crowd attendances didn't go unnoticed and they were offered the opportunity to be a part of the National Soccer League; however they declined due to poor administration within the Soccer Australia sector and the large financial burden it would place on the club, with many other clubs within the league at the time financially struggling. Avala returned to top flight action in 1989, undergoing a name change to Bonnyrigg White Eagles after the 1992 season, and remained in the Top Division until 2006.

After picking up both a premiership and championship over the next three seasons in the Super League, in 2009 Bonnyrigg was once again promoted to the New South Wales Premier League, playing in the highest league in New South Wales. They quickly picked up more honours by claiming their 4th and 5th New South Wales Premier League Premierships and Club Championships in the 2010 and 2012 seasons respectively, also suffering grand final defeats in the 2005, 2010 and 2012 seasons. They won the championship for a third time in the 2013 NSW Premier League season and for a fourth time in 2015.

Whilst competing in the NSW Premier League the club has claimed five Premierships and three Championships. Under Brian Brown the club has achieved three Premierships respectively in 2010, 2012 and 2014 alongside two Championships in 2013 defeating the Rockdale City Suns at Penrith Stadium in front of over 8000 spectators thanks to a solitary goal from Former Adelaide United Striker Robbie Younis. The club continued their Championship winning feat in 2015 with a 2–0 victory of arch rivals Blacktown City at Leichhardt Oval in-front of a crowd of 3000. The club also reached the 2010 and 2012 NSW Premier League Grand Finals but lost to Blacktown City and Marconi Stallions respectively.

In 2016, Bonnyrigg White Eagles qualified for the FFA Cup round of 32 after beating Parramatta FC in the final qualification round. This was Bonnyrigg's debut appearance in the final rounds of the Cup.

After an abysmal 2018 season for the club, the Bonnyrigg White Eagles were relegated and will now compete in the NSW NPL 2 competition in 2019.

In 2025 season NSW League One, the club were relegated again and they will compete in the NSW League Two for 2026 season.

== Colours and badge ==
Bonnyrigg White Eagles' home colours have been the traditional red shirt, blue shorts and white socks since the club's inception. The away kit has seen changes from year to year and is currently white shirt, blue shorts and blue socks.

Bonnyrigg's club badge consists and a crowned double-headed White Eagle with a soccer ball over a boomerang in its centre. The badge is similar in design to certain elements of the Coat of arms of Serbia. This is overlaid over a red-blue-white background which mirrors the club's main kit.

== Stadium ==
Bonnyrigg White Eagles play their home matches at Bonnyrigg Sports Club in Bonnyrigg, Sydney, New South Wales, Australia.

The ground dates back to May 1966 when 7 acres (28,000 m^{2}) of land was purchased for the building of a social club and soccer grounds. Over the years the grounds were improved when in 1986 it became the permanent home ground for Bonnyrigg.

In 2001, an additional 1.2 hectares of land was purchased as part of a plan to renovate the club and expand the training grounds. This was completed in October 2005.

== Rivalries ==
=== Sydney United ===
Bonnyrigg has a fierce rivalry with the Croatian backed Sydney United. The two clubs first met in the state leagues in the late 1970s with then Sydney Croatia dominating almost most of the games between the two clubs. Avala and Croatia met in the Ampol Cup Semi Final in 1977 in which Avala defeated Croatia one goal to nil. The last time the two clubs would meet would be in 1983 with Croatia being promoted to the National Soccer League and Avala remaining in the State leagues.

After the demise of the National Soccer League in 2005 the New South Wales Premier league was formed pitting arch rivals Bonnyrigg and Sydney United. The first game was played at the Sydney United Sports Centre in which Bonnyrigg won, the winner coming from a young Milorad Simonović

The second clash between United and Bonnyrigg was moved to Parramatta Stadium due to crowd violence. The Eagles took the game out four goals to one. Bonnyrigg was demoted to the Winter Super League due to fan violence and would not meet Sydney United again until 2009.

=== SSC Yugal ===
The club had a fierce rivalry with the Yugoslav backed SSC Yugal. This was mainly due to Avala being a Pro-Serbian club and SSC Yugal being a Pro-Yugoslav club. The games between the two clubs were at times met with fan violence. SSC Yugal folded in the early 1990s, ending the rivalry.

=== Blacktown City ===
Blacktown and Bonnyrigg are long time rivals with the history of both teams dating back to the 1970s where they first met. Avala met Blacktown in the 1992 Grand Final which they took out two goals to nil. The clubs would meet again in the 1998 Grand Final in which the Demons would take out.

The games between the two have always been close and fierce. In the 2010 New South Wales Premier league season Bonnyrigg would be crowned premiers only to lose out to Blacktown in the Grand Final with a late winner from former Bonnyrigg player Tolgay Ozbey

Various other important rivalries over the years included matches against Marconi Stallions FC, Bankstown City FC, FC Bossy Liverpool, Parramatta FC, Northern Tigers FC and Canberra FC.

== Supporters ==
Bonnyrigg White Eagles generally draws support from the Serbian diaspora, especially from the south-western suburbs of Sydney such as Bonnyrigg, Liverpool and Cabramatta.

The "Avala Boys", is the name given to the actively vocal supporters group of the soccer club. After years, the Avala Boys have made their long-awaited return in 2025, bringing back the passion, loyalty, and raw energy that defined them. With flags waving and chants echoing through the stands, they’ve re-established their presence, standing tall as the heartbeat of their club. Notable appearances include: SD Raiders vs Bonnyrigg 22/3/25

== Notable players and coaches ==
The following Bonnyrigg White Eagles players and coaches have also represented their country at international level.

Australia

- (Australia) Agenor Muniz
- (Australia) Milan Blagojević
- (Australia) Rod Brown
- (Australia) Doug Utjesenovic
- (Australia) Greg Brown
- (Australia) Milos Degenek
- (Australia) Bobby Despotovski
- (Australia) Gary van Egmond
- (Australia) Paul Foster
- (Australia) Craig Foster
- (Australia) Mike Gibson
- (Australia) Tony Henderson
- (Australia) Stan Ackerley
- (Australia) Marshall Soper
- (Australia) Warren Spink
- (Australia) Robert Wheatley
- (Australia) Greg Woodhouse
- (Australia) Danny Vukovic

Yugoslavia

- (Socialist Federal Republic of Yugoslavia) Misha Radovic

Guinea

- (Guinea) Ballamodou Conde

Lebanon

- (Lebanon) Jackson Khoury

Liberia

- (Liberia) Moussa Sanoh

Malaysia

- (Malaysia) Brendan Gan

Mozambique

- (Mozambique) Jojó

New Zealand

- (New Zealand) Glen Moss

Northern Ireland

- (Northern Ireland) Terry McFlynn

Peru

- (Peru) Daniel Cortez

Philippines

- (Philippines) Leigh Gunn

Serbia

- (Serbia) Saša Ilić

Indonesia

- (Indonesia) Osas Saha

== Honours ==
Bonnyrigg's most notable achievements include;

- League:
  - NSW Premier League Championship (x4): 1992, 2001, 2013, 2015
  - NSW Premier League Premiership (x6): 1992, 1998, 1999, 2010, 2012, 2014
  - NSW Premier League Championship Runners Up (x6): 1997, 1998, 2000, 2005, 2010, 2012
  - NSW Premier League Premiership Runners Up (x4): 2000, 2001, 2002, 2005
  - NSW Premier League Club Championship (x3): 2005, 2010, 2012
  - NSW Super League Club Championship (x1): 2008
  - NSW Super League Championship (x3) :1976, 1988, 2007
  - NSW Super League Premiership (x3): 1976, 1988, 2008
  - NSW Super League Premiership Runners Up (x1): 2007
  - NSW Division One Champions (x1) : 1973
- Cup
  - National Premier Leagues Cup Runners Up (x1): 2014
  - Ampol Cup Winners (x1): 1977
  - Waratah Cup (x2): 1992, 2004
  - Waratah Cup Runners Up (x1): 1991
  - Johnny Warren Cup Winners (x2): 2003, 2005
  - NSW Continental Tyres Cup Runners Up (x1): 2004
  - White Eagles Cup Runners Up (x1): 2012
  - Karadjordje Cup Winners (x4): 1992, 1993, 1995, 2000
  - Karadjordje Cup Runners-Up (x5): 1988, 1990, 1991, 1994, 1996

== The treble ==
Bonnyrigg's most successful year in their history came about in the 1992 season, a year their fans will never forget. A squad mixed with youth and experience, and ably led by coach Mike Johnson, won the Minor Premiership, the NSW Premier League Grand Final as well as the NSW Waratah Cup.

== 2004–05 season controversy ==
The 2004–05 season was marred by controversy when Serbian fans of Bonnyrigg and Croatian fans of neighbouring club Sydney United engaged in riots. At the height of tensions gunshots were fired at the Bonnyrigg Sports Club and a car was fire bombed at Sydney United's King Tomislav Croatian Club at Edensor Park. The result was that the Football NSW had directed that all future games between the clubs must be held at a neutral venue.

Bonnyrigg lost 3–1 to Bankstown City Lions in the 2004–05 NSW Premier League grand final.

Despite finishing Grand Finalists in 2004–05 and claiming the club championship, Bonnyrigg were not offered a position in the 2006 NSW Premier League season. The club's appeal of this decision failed and they competed in the Winter Super League for the next three seasons until promoted back to the highest level of competition in NSW for the 2009 season.
