= Seymour Shaw Park =

Stadium in Miranda, New South Wales

- Interactive map of Seymour Shaw Park
- Full name: Seymour Shaw Park
- Location: Miranda, New South Wales
- Coordinates: 34°1′49″S 151°6′8″E
- Owner: Sutherland Sharks Football Club
- Capacity: 5,000 (1,000 seated)
- Surface: Synthetic

Construction
- Opened: 1950
- Renovated: February 2007
- Cost: A$1.2 million (Facility upgrades)

Tenant
- Sutherland Sharks FC (1959-present)

Seymour Shaw Park is a football (soccer) stadium in Miranda, New South Wales, Australia. It is the current home ground of the Sutherland Sharks Football Club who play in the state league, the New South Wales Premier League.

== History ==
Seymour Shaw Park has been the Sharks home ground since the club's move from Sutherland Oval in the late 1950s. The ground has continuously been used to host regular season club games along with hosting the TigerTurf Cup, similar to England's FA Cup, with the Grand Final being played at the ground due to the surface being Synthetic which is supplied by TigerTurf Accessories. In 1979, the venue hosted the first 'A' international of the Australia women's national soccer team, which ended in a 2-2 draw against New Zealand In recent times, the Sharks invested into Seymour Shaw Park to upgrade the facilities with additional seating in a new grandstand, upgrading of floodlighting and the installation of the synthetic turf, being completed in February 2007. It is both the first approved football field of any code and first FIFA approved field in Australia.
