= Sutherland Sharks FC =

- Full name: Sutherland Sharks FC
- Nicknames: Sutho, The Sharks
- Founded: 1930; 96 years ago
- Stadium: Seymour Shaw Park
- Capacity: 5,000
- Chairman: Allan Edmondson
- Manager: David Perkovic
- League: NPL NSW
- 2026: 4th of 16
- Website: sharksfc.com.au
Home colours	Away colours

Sutherland Sharks FC is an Australian association football club based in the suburb of Sutherland in Sydney, New South Wales. The club currently competes in the National Premier Leagues NSW. Its home games are played at Seymour Shaw Park, located in the southern Sydney suburb of Miranda. It is incorporated as a non-profit club.They will also compete in the 2026 Australian Championship after finishing fourth placed in the regular season of NPL NSW in the 2026 season.

== History ==
The origins of Sutherland Sharks are traced back to the founding of Sutherland United SFC in 1930. By 1936, the club had grown markedly leading to a split and formation of the current-day club, albeit under a different name – Casuals Soccer Football Club. In the post-WWII era, the club grew and found success in the St George Football Association but in 1947 they stepped up to the Metropolitan Soccer League (effectively the Sydney 2nd Division, behind only the old NSW Soccer Association 1st Division). The club soon earned its stripes in this highly competitive league winning the title in just their second year and gaining promotion to the heady heights of the 1st Division but disappointingly, financial constraints forced them to let the opportunity pass. It was another 24 years before the club moved into the top flight state league.

In 1949 the club changed its name to the more representative Sutherland Shire Casuals SFC, and in 1950 the club acquired a long-term lease on the Seymour Shaw field. However the club did not move permanently to the Miranda ground until 1959, continuing to use Sutherland Oval. In 1955, the club again changed its name to Sutherland Shire Soccer Football Club. In 1961 it amalgamated with the ailing St George district club (a separate entity to the later St George Budapest) and for a brief period became 'Sutherland–St George SFC' before reverting to its previous name in 1963.

The club made the 1967 Sydney Federation Division Two Final series after finishing the season in fourth. The club then finished second in the Final series and qualified for the Grand Final against Bankstown who finished first. Sutherland Shire lost the game 1–0.

In 1971 Sutherland won the Sydney Federation Division Two, securing promotion to the NSW top league. In 1978 the club won a major trophy for the first time when they claimed the prestigious Ampol Cup. Later that year Sutherland defeated Sydney Croatia 2–1 in a replayed Grand Final at Wentworth Park. The club again won the Ampol Cup in 1981 and also achieved a 3–1 Grand Final win against Melita Eagles at St George Stadium in 1986.

In 1984, when the National Soccer League expanded by the addition of four Sydney clubs, Sutherland, who was initially tipped to join the league, was edged out by the newly formed Penrith City. During the 1990s the club recorded its first ever premiership in 1991, and followed this up with a repeat victory in 1996. The club remained in the 1st Division until the 2001/02 season, relegating for two seasons and then returning to the top flight.

=== Rebrand ===
On 31 January 2025, Sutherland Sharks FC changed its name to Sharks FC as part of a rebrand. However, the decision was reversed less than two weeks later on 12 February 2025 following negative feedback.

== Current squad ==
As of 23 September 2026

Note: Flags indicate national team as defined under FIFA eligibility rules; some limited exceptions apply. Players may hold more than one non-FIFA nationality.

No.	Pos.	Nation	Player
1	GK	AUS	Danijel Nizic
2	DF	AUS	Lachlan Macdonald
3	DF	AUS	Yianni Nicolaou
4	DF	NED	Thijs van Amerongen
5	DF	AUS	Jordan Perez
6	MF	AUS	Ryley Hollingdale
7	FW	JPN	Takumi Ofuka
8	MF	MAS	Brendan Gan
9	FW	AUS	Milislav Popovic
10	MF	AUS	Tariq Maia
11	FW	AUS	Danny Choi
12	GK	AUS	James Husoy

No.	Pos.	Nation	Player
13	DF	AUS	Zachary Nikolovski
14	MF	JPN	Yuto Kokuryo
15	DF	AUS	Jamie Percevski
16	DF	AUS	Jacob McLachlan
17	MF	AUS	Richard Shoueiki
18	DF	AUS	Gian Lino Fiorese
20	DF	AUS	Jackson Barter
21	MF	AUS	Nicholas Olsen
22	MF	AUS	Ty Mcgowan
23	MF	AUS	Lachlan Maher
25	DF	AUS	Matthew Jurman
—	DF	AUS	Michael Marcevski

== Honours ==
- National Premier Leagues NSW grand final:
  - Champions (3): 1978, 1986, 2009
- National Premier Leagues NSW regular season:
  - Premiers (2): 1991, 2008
- NSW Division One:
  - Champions (1): 1971
  - Runners-Up (3): 1967, 1970
  - Premiers (1): 1971
- Waratah Cup:
  - Champions (4): 1978, 1981, 2009, 2012
