= 2017 APIA Leichhardt Tigers FC season =

APIA Leichhardt Tigers
2017 season
- Stadium: Lambert Park, Sydney
- National Premier Leagues NSW: Premiers
- NPL NSW Finals: Runners-up
- FFA Cup: Round of 16
- Waratah Cup: Runners-up
Home colours	Away colours

The 2017 APIA Leichhardt Tigers FC season is the club's second season in the National Premier Leagues (NSW) and in the top league of NPL NSW, National Premier Leagues NSW Men's 1.

== Players ==
=== Squad information ===
Note: Flags indicate national team as defined under FIFA eligibility rules; some limited exceptions apply. Players may hold more than one non-FIFA nationality.

No.	Pos.	Nation	Player
1	GK	AUS	Ivan Necevski
2	DF	AUS	Nathan Millgate
3	DF	AUS	Paul Galimi
4	DF	AUS	Josh Symons
7	MF	AUS	Sean O'Connell
8	MF	AUS	Corey Biczo
9	FW	ENG	Matt West
10	FW	AUS	Franco Parisi
11	FW	AUS	Jordan Murray

No.	Pos.	Nation	Player
12	MF	AUS	Dominic Cox
13	DF	AUS	David D'Apuzzo
15	DF	AUS	Themba Muata-Marlow
16	MF	AUS	Sean Symons
17	DF	AUS	Adrian Vlastelica
18	MF	AUS	Adrian Ucchino
19	MF	AUS	Brandon Lundy
20	MF	JPN	Tasuku Sekiya
22	GK	AUS	Luke Turnbull

=== Transfers in ===
No.	Pos.	Nat.	Name	Age	Moving from	Type	Transfer window	Ends	Transfer fee	Source
15	DF	(Australia)	Themba Muata-Marlow	23	Newcastle Jets	Transfer				
1	GK	(Australia)	Ivan Necevski	37	Central Coast Mariners	Transfer		2017	Free	

=== Transfers out ===
No.	Pos.	Nat.	Name	Age	Moving to	Type	Transfer window	Transfer fee	Source
1	GK	(Australia)	Ivan Necevski	37	Newcastle Jets	Replacement contract	End-season		

== Technical staff ==
Position	Name
Head coach	
Assistant coach	
Goalkeeping coach	

== Statistics ==
=== Squad statistics ===
N	Pos.	Nat.	Name	Total					FFA Cup
N	Pos.	Nat.	Name	Apps	Goals	Yellow card	Second yellow card	Red card	Apps	Goals	Yellow card	Second yellow card	Red card
1	GK	(Australia)	Ivan Necevski	2	0	0	0	0	2+0	0	0	0	0
2	DF	(Australia)	Nathan Millgate	2	0	0	0	0	2+0	0	0	0	0
3	DF	(Australia)	Paul Galimi	1	0	0	0	0	0+1	0	0	0	0
4	DF	(Australia)	Josh Symons	2	0	1	0	0	2+0	0	1	0	0
7	MF	(Australia)	Sean O'Connell	2	0	0	0	0	1+1	0	0	0	0
8	MF	(Australia)	Corey Biczo	2	0	0	0	0	2+0	0	0	0	0
9	FW	(England)	Matt West	1	0	1	0	0	0+1	0	1	0	0
10	FW	(Australia)	Franco Parisi	2	0	0	0	0	0+2	0	0	0	0
11	FW	(Australia)	Jordan Murray	2	1	0	0	0	2+0	1	0	0	0
12	MF	(Australia)	Dylan Cox	1	0	0	0	0	1+0	0	0	0	0
13	DF	(Australia)	David D'Apuzzo	2	1	0	0	0	1+1	1	0	0	0
15	DF	(Australia)	Themba Muata-Marlow	2	1	0	0	0	2+0	1	0	0	0
16	MF	(Australia)	Sean Symons	2	3	0	0	0	2+0	3	0	0	0
17	DF	(Australia)	Adrian Vlastelica	0	0	0	0	0	0+0	0	0	0	0
18	MF	(Australia)	Adrian Ucchino	1	0	0	0	0	1+0	0	0	0	0
19	MF	(Australia)	Brandon Lundy	2	0	0	0	0	2+0	0	0	0	0
20	MF	(Japan)	Tasuku Sekiya	2	1	0	0	0	2+0	1	0	0	0
22	GK	(Australia)	Luke Turnbull	0	0	0	0	0	0+0	0	0	0	0

- Source: au.soccerway.com
- (yellow card) = Number of bookings; (second yellow card) = Number of sending offs after a second yellow card; (red card) = Number of sending offs by a direct red card.

== Friendlies ==
22 January 2017	APIA Leichhardt Tigers (Australia)	1–0	(Australia) Avondale
14:15	N/A		N/A

1 February 2017	Mt Druitt Town (Australia)	2–3	(Australia) APIA Leichhardt Tigers
20:00	N/A		N/A

5 February 2017	Bankstown City Lions (Australia)	Cancelled	(Australia) APIA Leichhardt Tigers
18:30

8 February 2017	Marconi Stallions (Australia)	Cancelled	(Australia) APIA Leichhardt Tigers
19:45

12 February 2017	APIA Leichhardt Tigers (Australia)	5–1	(Australia) Dunbar Rovers
20:00	N/A		N/A

19 February 2017	APIA Leichhardt Tigers (Australia)	5–0	(Australia) GHFA Spirit
18:45	N/A		N/A

28 September 2017	Western Sydney Wanderers (Australia)	3–0	(Australia) APIA Leichhardt Tigers	Sydney, Australia
19:30 AEST	Bridge 65'; Cejudo 66'; Lustica 81'	Report		Stadium: Marconi Stadium

== Competitions ==
=== National Premier Leagues NSW ===
Pos	Team	Pld	W	D	L	GF	GA	GD	Pts	Qualification or relegation
1	APIA Leichhardt Tigers	22	16	1	5	50	18	+32	49	2017 National Premier Leagues Finals
2	Blacktown City	22	14	5	3	45	22	+23	47	2017 NSW Finals
3	Rockdale City Suns	22	12	6	4	42	28	+14	42	2017 NSW Finals
4	Manly United (C)	22	13	3	6	47	36	+11	42	2017 NSW Finals
5	Sydney Olympic	22	12	4	6	35	23	+12	40	2017 NSW Finals
6	Wollongong Wolves	22	12	1	9	35	28	+7	37	
7	Sydney United 58	22	10	4	8	42	27	+15	34	
8	Hakoah Sydney City East	22	6	6	10	28	35	−7	24	
9	Bonnyrigg White Eagles	22	5	4	13	31	50	−19	19	
10	Sutherland Sharks	22	5	1	16	29	55	−26	16	
11	Sydney FC Youth	22	6	2	14	34	52	−18	14 (Note: Sydney FC Youth six points deducted for misconduct.)	
12	Parramatta FC (R)	22	1	3	18	16	60	−44	6	Relegation to the 2018 NPL NSW 2 (Note: Promotion and Relegation system based on Club Championship and including points from U20 and U18 teams.)

Source: sportstg.com
Rules for classification: 1) points; 2) goal difference; 3) number of goals scored.
(C) Champions; (R) Relegated

=== Results summary ===
Overall								Home						Away					
Pld	W	D	L	GF	GA	GD	Pts	W	D	L	GF	GA	GD	W	D	L	GF	GA	GD
21	15	1	5	52	18	+34	46	9	1	1	32	4	+28	6	0	4	20	14	+6

=== Results by round ===
Round	1	2	3	4	5	6	7	8	9	10	11	12	13	14	15	16	17	18	19	20	21	22
Ground	A	H	A	H	A	H	A	H	A	H	A	H	A	H	A	H	A	H	A	H	A	H
Result	W	W	W	W	L	W	W	L	L	W	W	W	W	W	L	W	L	W	W	W	W	D
Position	2	1	1	1	1	2	1	3	3	3	1	1	1	1	2	2	2	2	2	2	1	1

Source: sportstg.com
A = Away; H = Home; W = Win; D = Draw; L = Loss

==== Matches ====
12 March 2017 1	Sydney United 58	0–3	APIA Leichhardt Tigers	Sydney
18:00	N/A		N/A	Stadium: Sydney United Sports Centre

19 March 2017 2	APIA Leichhardt Tigers	2–0	Hakoah Sydney City East	Sydney
16:45	N/A		N/A	Stadium: Lambert Park

18:30 3	Sutherland Sharks	3–4	APIA Leichhardt Tigers	Sydney
18:30	N/A		N/A	Stadium: Seymour Shaw Park

2 April 2017 4	APIA Leichhardt Tigers	4–0	Bonnyrigg White Eagles	Sydney
16:45	N/A		N/A	Stadium: Lambert Park2

9 April 2017 5	Wollongong Wolves	1–0	APIA Leichhardt Tigers	Wollongong
15:00	N/A		N/A	Stadium: WIN Stadium

14 April 2017 6	APIA Leichhardt Tigers	3–0	Sydney FC Youth	Sydney
16:45	N/A		N/A	Stadium: Lambert Park

22 April 2017 7	Parramatta	1–3	APIA Leichhardt Tigers	Chester Hill
19:00	N/A		N/A	Stadium: Melita Stadium

30 April 2017 8	APIA Leichhardt Tigers	1–2	Sydney Olympic	Sydney
16:45	N/A		N/A	Attendance: Lambert Park

6 May 2017 9	Manly United	4–2	APIA Leichhardt Tigers	Sydney
19:00	N/A		N/A	Stadium: Cromer Park

14 May 2017 10	APIA Leichhardt Tigers	1–0	Blacktown City	Sydney
16:45	N/A		N/A	Stadium: Lambert Park

21 May 2017 11	Rockdale City Suns	0–2	APIA Leichhardt Tigers	Sydney
17:00	N/A		N/A	Stadium: Rockdale Ilinden Sports Centre

27 May 2017 12	APIA Leichhardt Tigers	1–0	Sydney United 58	Sydney
19:45	N/A		N/A	Stadium: Lambert Park

3 June 2017 13	Hakoah Sydney City East	1–4	APIA Leichhardt Tigers	Botany Bay
19:00	N/A		N/A	Stadium: Hensley Athletic Field

10 June 2017 14	APIA Leichhardt Tigers	2–0	Sutherland Sharks	Sydney
19:45	N/A		N/A	Stadium: Lambert Park

17 June 2017 15	Bonnyrigg White Eagles	1–0	APIA Leichhardt Tigers	Sydney
19:00	N/A		N/A	Stadium: Bonnyrigg Sports Club

25 June 2017 16	APIA Leichhardt Tigers	2–1	Wollongong Wolves	Sydney
16:45	N/A		N/A	Stadium: Lambert Park

1 July 2017 17	Sydney FC Youth	2–1	APIA Leichhardt Tigers	Sydney
18:00	N/A		N/A	Stadium: Lambert Park

16 July 2017 18	APIA Leichhardt Tigers	6–0	Parramatta	Sydney
16:45	N/A		N/A	Stadium: Lambert Park

23 July 2017 19	Sydney Olympic	1–2	APIA Leichhardt Tigers	Sydney
17:00	N/A		N/A	Stadium: Belmore Sports Ground

29 July 2017 20	APIA Leichhardt Tigers	5–0	Manly United	Sydney
19:45	N/A		N/A	Stadium: Lambert Park

6 August 2017 21	Blacktown City	0–1	APIA Leichhardt Tigers	Blacktown
15:00	N/A		N/A	Stadium: Lily's Football Centre

13 August 2017 22	APIA Leichhardt Tigers	1–1	Rockdale City Suns	Sydney
15:00	N/A		N/A	Stadium: Lambert Park

==== Finals ====
26 August 2017 Semi-final	APIA Leichhardt Tigers	5–0	Rockdale City Suns	Sydney
19:30	N/A		N/A	Stadium: Lambert Park

10 September 2017 Grand Final	APIA Leichhardt Tigers	0–0 (a.e.t.) (3–4 p)	Manly United	Sydney
16:00				Stadium: Leichhardt Oval
	Penalties
	N/A		N/A

=== FFA Cup ===
==== Matches ====
1 August 2017 Round of 32	Olympia	0–5	APIA Leichhardt Tigers	Hobart
19:30		Report	Symons 6', 79', 86'; D'Apuzzo 27' (pen.); Sekiya 84'	Stadium: KGV Park; Attendance: 1,252; Referee: Shaun Evans

29 August 2017 Round of 16	Blacktown City	3–1	APIA Leichhardt Tigers	Sydney
19:30	Gibbs 23', 70'; Mallia 52'	Report	Murray 16'	Stadium: Lily's Football Centre; Attendance: 924; Referee: Kris Griffiths-Jones

=== Waratah Cup ===
==== Matches ====
28 June 2017 Semi-final	Blacktown City	0–3	APIA Leichhardt Tigers	Blacktown
		Report	Symons 54'; Ucchino 66'; Sekiya 68'	Stadium: Lilys Football Centre

9 July 2017 Grand Final	APIA Leichhardt Tigers	1–3	Hakoah Sydney City East	Sydney
16:00 AEST	Symons 39'		L.Jones 7' (pen.); Jablonski 80'; H.Jones 90+2'	Stadium: Lambert Park
