= 2017 National Premier Leagues NSW Grand Final =

2017 NPL NSW Grand Final
- Event: 2017 NPL NSW Grand Final
APIA Leichhardt Tigers	Manly United
0	0
- Manly United won 3–4 on penalties
- Date: 10 September 2017
- Venue: Leichhardt Oval, Sydney
- Robbie Slater Medal: Dylan Mitchell
- Referee: Kurt Ams

The 2017 National Premier Leagues NSW Grand Final was played on 10 September 2017, at Leichhardt Oval in Sydney. The match was contested between APIA Leichhardt Tigers and Manly United.

Manly United won the match, defeating APIA Leichhardt Tigers 3–4 on penalties after the match finished 0–0 after extra time.

== Route to the final ==
Qualifying Finals
2	Blacktown City	2
3	Rockdale City	4
4	Manly United	2
5	Sydney Olympic	1

Semi-finals
1	APIA Leichhardt	5
3	Rockdale City	0
2	Blacktown City	0
4	Manly United	2

Preliminary Finals
3	Rockdale City	2 (4)
4	Manly United	2 (5)

Grand Final
1	APIA Leichhardt	0 (3)
4	Manly United	0 (4)

== Match ==
=== Details ===
10 September 2017
16:00

APIA Leichhardt Tigers	0–0 (a.e.t.)	Manly United
	Reports
Penalties
Parisi (penalty scored); J. Symons (penalty missed); Muata-Marlow (penalty scored); Lundy (penalty missed); West (penalty scored)	3–4	Cholakian (penalty scored); Ferguson (penalty scored); Paull (penalty missed); Lobb (penalty scored); Taneski (penalty scored)

Leichhardt Oval, Sydney
Referee: Kurt Ams

1	(Australia) Ivan Necevski (yellow card) 120'
2	(Australia) Nathan Millgate
4	(Australia) Josh Symons
8	(Australia) Corey Bizco		(substituted off) 105'
11	(Australia) Jordan Murray		(substituted off) 62'
13	(Australia) David D'Apuzzo (c)	(yellow card) 60'
15	(Australia) Themba Muata-Marlow	(yellow card) 45'
16	(Australia) Sean Symons (yellow card) 115'
18	(Australia) Adrian Ucchino		(substituted off) 81'
19	(Australia) Brandon Lundy
20	(Australia) Tasuku Sekiya
Substitutes:
22	(Australia) Luke Turnbull
7	(Australia) Dominic Cox		(substituted on) 105'
9	(Australia) Matthew West		(substituted on) 81'
10	(Australia) Franco Parisi	(yellow card) 65'	(substituted on) 62'
17	(Australia) Adrian Vlastelica
Head coach:
(Australia) Danial Cummins

1	(Australia) Dylan Mitchell
2	(Australia) Keiran Paull
3	(Australia) Jamie Lobb (c)
4	(Australia) Travis Oughtred
6	(Australia) Dominic Ferguson
8	(Australia) Sasa Macura
9	(Australia) Dylan Macallister	Yellow card	(substituted off) 82'
10	(Australia) Brendan Cholakian
12	(Australia) Leigh Egger
13	(Australia) Scott Balderson	Yellow card	(substituted off) 67'
14	(Australia) Dejan Pandurevic		(substituted off) 105'
Substitutes:
20	(Australia) Shaun Catlin
11	(Australia) Nikola Taneski		(substituted on) 67'
15	(Australia) Marco Sama	Yellow card	(substituted on) 82'
17	(Australia) Sam Wilson		(substituted on) 105'
21	(Australia) Joseph Fox
Head coach:
(Australia) Warren Greive

Robbie Slater Medal:
Dylan Mitchell (Manly United)

Assistant referees:
Matthew McOrist
Janush Adabjou
Fourth official:
Kris Griffiths-Jones

Match rules

- 90 minutes.
- 30 minutes of extra time if necessary.
- Penalty shoot-out if scores still level.
- Five named substitutes.
