= Bicentennial Park =

Bicentennial Park may refer to:

== Australia ==
- Bicentennial Park, Sydney Olympic Park at the Homebush Bay in Sydney, New South Wales
- Rockdale Bicentennial Park in the Sydney suburb of Rockdale
- Bicentennial Park South in the Sydney suburb of Rockdale
- Bicentennial Park (Darwin) in Darwin, Northern Territory

== Chile ==
- Bicentennial Park (Vitacura) in Santiago

== Ecuador ==
- Parque Bicentenario de Quito

== Mexico ==
- Bicentennial Park (Mexico City)

== United States ==
- Bicentennial Park (Allentown), Pennsylvania
- Bicentennial Park (Columbus, Ohio)
- Bicentennial Park (Hillsboro, Oregon)
- Bicentennial Park (Miami), Florida, now Museum Park
  - Bicentennial Park (Metromover station), now Museum Park station
- Bicentennial Park (Oklahoma City), Oklahoma
- Bicentennial Capitol Mall State Park, Nashville, Tennessee
- Bicentennial Greenbelt Park, Maryville, Tennessee
- Far North Bicentennial Park, Anchorage, Alaska
