= 2026 National Premier Leagues NSW Men's =

Soccer league in New South Wales, Australia

National Premier Leagues NSW
- Season: 2026
- Dates: 8 February – 13 September 2026
- Teams: 16
- Champions: Sydney United
- Premiers: APIA Leichhardt
- Matches: 232
- Goals: 645 (2.78 per match)
- Top goalscorer: Awan Lual (20 goals)
- Biggest home win: Marconi Stallions 6 - 1 SD Raiders (11 Apr 2026); UNSW FC 5 - 0 St George City (28 Mar 2026)
- Biggest away win: Sydney FC Youth 0-6 Western Sydney Wanderers Youth (29 May 2026)
- All statistics correct as of 23 August 2026.

The 2026 National Premier Leagues NSW season was the 14th season of the National Premier Leagues (NPL) in New South Wales. The season began on 8 February, and ended on 13 September.

NWS Spirit were the defending premiers from. 2025.

APIA Leichhardt were the Premiers, and Sydney United were the Champions.

== Teams ==
=== Team Changes ===
The following teams have changed division since the 2024–25 season.

==== To NPL NSW ====
Promoted from 2025 NSW League One

- UNSW FC
- SD Raiders FC

==== From NPL NSW ====
Relegated to 2026 NSW League One

- Central Coast Mariners Academy
- Mount Druitt Town Rangers

=== Stadiums and locations ===
Locations of teams in the 2026 National Premier Leagues NSW

Team	Head coach	Location	Stadium	Capacity
APIA Leichhardt	(Australia) Franco Parisi	Leichhardt	Lambert Park	7,000
Blacktown City	(Australia) Mark Crittenden	Blacktown	Landen Stadium	7,500
Manly United	(Australia) Vladimir Knezevic	Dee Why	Cromer Park	5,000
Marconi Stallions	(Australia) Peter Tsekenis	Fairfield	Marconi Stadium	9,000
NWS Spirit	(Australia) David Perkovic	Macquarie Park	Christie Park	1,000
Rockdale Ilinden	(Australia) Paul Dee	Rockdale	Rockdale Ilinden Sports Centre	5,000
SD Raiders	(Australia) Goran Ljuboja	Moorebank	Ernie Smith Reserve	1,000
St George FC	(Australia) Brian Brown	St George	Barton Park	1,500
St George City	(Australia) Mirko Jurilj	St George	Penshurst Park	1,000
Sutherland Sharks FC	(Australia) David Perkovic	Sutherland	Seymour Shaw Park	5,000
Sydney FC Youth	(Australia) Jimmy Van Weeren	Rockdale	Rockdale Ilinden Sports Centre	5,000
Sydney Olympic	(Australia) Michael Melito (interim)	Belmore	Belmore Sports Ground	20,000
Sydney United	(Australia) Miro Vlastelica	Edensor Park	Sydney United Sports Centre	12,000
UNSW FC	(Australia) Gabriel Knowles	Kensington	The Village Green	500
Western Sydney Wanderers Youth	(Australia) Panny Nikas	Blacktown	Wanderers Football Park	1,500
Wollongong Wolves	(Australia) Luke Wilkshire	Wollongong	WIN Stadium	22,000

=== Managerial changes ===
Team	Outgoing manager	Manner of departure	Date of vacancy	Position in table	Incoming manager	Date of appointment
Sydney Olympic FC	David Magrone	Mutual Agreement	15 April 2026	16th	Michael Melito (Interim)	15 April 2026
St George FC	Raphael Marie	Sacked	5 May 2026	10th	Brian Brown	5 May 2026

== Regular season ==
=== League table ===
Pos	Team	Pld	W	D	L	GF	GA	GD	Pts	Qualification or relegation
1	APIA Leichhardt (Note: Team pre-qualified to the Australian Championship as a Foundation club.)	30	21	5	4	66	35	+31	68	Qualification to Finals series
2	Sydney United 58 (C)	30	20	4	6	47	20	+27	64	Qualification to Finals series
3	Marconi Stallions	30	19	5	6	50	22	+28	62	Qualification to Finals series
4	Sutherland Sharks (Q)	30	14	4	12	46	38	+8	46	Qualification to Australian Championship and Finals series (Note: The next highest non-foundation club qualifies if any of the five NPL NSW foundation clubs are the Premier.)
5	Manly United	30	12	8	10	39	35	+4	44	Qualification to Finals series
6	NWS Spirit	30	12	5	13	37	38	−1	41	Qualification to Finals series
7	SD Raiders	30	12	5	13	44	49	−5	41	
8	Sydney FC Youth (Note: Team is ineligible to qualify for the 2026 Australian Championship as the academy of an A-League club.)	30	11	8	11	38	43	−5	41	
9	Rockdale Ilinden	30	12	4	14	46	44	+2	40	
10	Western Sydney Wanderers Youth	30	11	5	14	55	49	+6	38	
11	Wollongong Wolves	30	11	5	14	35	43	−8	38	
12	St George City	30	10	7	13	30	46	−16	37	
13	Blacktown City	30	9	8	13	43	46	−3	35	
14	UNSW FC	30	9	5	16	38	49	−11	32	
15	St George FC (O)	30	8	3	19	28	55	−27	27	Relegation playoff with 2nd position of 2026 NSW League One
16	Sydney Olympic (R)	30	6	5	19	32	62	−30	23	Relegation to 2027 NSW League One

Source: Dribl
Rules for classification: 1) points; 2) goal difference; 3) number of goals scored; 4) head-to-head points; 5) head-to-head goals scored; 6) play-off.
(C) Champions; (O) Play-off winners; (Q) Qualified for the phase indicated; (R) Relegated

=== Matches ===
Home \ Away	APL	BLC	MAN	MRC	NWS	ROC	SDR	SGE	SOL	STG	SUN	SUT	SYD	UNS	WOL	WSW
APIA Leichhardt	—	3–2	2–0	1–1	3–2	0–2	3–1	2–1	4–1	4–2	2–1	2–1	2–1	4–1	2–0	4–1
Blacktown City	1–3	—	0–0	0–1	1–0	3–0 (Note: Originally played as a 1–2 victory for Rockdale Ilinden. Following an investigation, Football NSW determined that Rockdale Ilinden had fielded an ineligible player and awarded Blacktown City a 3–0 forfeit victory.)	1–2	2–1	0–2	3–0	0–0	2–3	4–2	0–0	1–3	1–3
Manly United	2–2	0–0	—	3–1	0–4	4–1	1–0	2–0	4–0	1–0	1–1	2–1	1–1	2–0	0–1	0–1
Marconi Stallions	2–1	2–0	4–1	—	1–1	1–1	6–1	2–0	2–0	0–1	0–1	1–0	0–0	1–0	1–0	3–0
NWS Spirit	1–2	3–1	2–1	0–3	—	0–2	1–0	3–1	3–0	2–0	2–3	1–0	0–4	2–1	2–0	0–4
Rockdale Ilinden	0–1	3–2	1–1	1–4	1–1	—	0–1	3–0	4–1	1–0	1–2	1–3	3–0	2–0	1–2	0–5
SD Raiders	2–3	1–3	3–1	2–1	0–0	1–2	—	1–0	1–5	3–1	0–1	2–2	0–1	2–0	1–1	3–0
St George FC	0–0	1–0	1–0	1–2	0–3	1–6	2–3	—	1–2	0–1	1–3	1–2	0–0	2–0	3–0	0–4
Sydney Olympic	1–3	1–3	0–1	0–1	1–2	0–4	1–1	0–2	—	2–2	1–1	1–2	1–2	2–1	3–2	0–4
St George City	2–1	2–2	1–2	1–2	1–0	1–0	4–3	0–0	1–1	—	1–0	1–0	0–5	0–2	0–1	1–0
Sydney United 58	0–0	2–0	2–0	1–0	2–0	1–0	1–0	6–0	3–0	0–0	—	0–1	1–0	5–2	0–1	3–2
Sutherland Sharks	3–2	1–2	3–0	2–4	1–0	3–1	1–2	0–1	1–1	2–1	1–2	—	1–1	1–0	2–1	2–3
Sydney FC Youth	0–2	2–2	0–0	1–0	1–0	2–1	3–2	4–2	2–0	0–2	1–0	0–0	—	0–2	1–2	0–6
UNSW FC	1–1	2–2	0–2	2–2	3–1	2–0	1–1	1–4	1–3	5–0	2–0	1–3	3–2	—	1–0	2–1
Wollongong Wolves	0–2	0–2	0–4	0–1	0–0	2–2	2–3	2–0	2–1	3–3	1–2	2–1	2–3	2–1	—	3–0
Western Sydney Wanderers Youth	3–5	3–3	3–3	0–1	1–1	0–2	1–2	1–2	2–1	1–1	0–2	0–3	4–0	2–1	0–0	—

Source: Dribl
Legend: Blue = home team win; Yellow = draw; Red = away team win.

== Finals series ==
=== Bracket ===
Elimination finals
3	Marconi Stallions	1
6	NWS Spirit	3
4	Sutherland Sharks	1 (4)
5	Manly United (p)	1 (5)

Preliminary finals
1	APIA Leichhardt	3
6	NWS Spirit	0
2	Sydney United	3
5	Manly United	1

Grand final
1	APIA Leichhardt	1
2	Sydney United	3

== Statistics ==
Last updated 8 September 2026.

=== Goals ===
Rank	Player	Team	Goals
1	Presley Ortiz	APIA Leichhardt	22
2	Awan Lual	Western Sydney Wanderers Youth FC	21
3	Moudi Najjar	Rockdale Ilinden	16
4	Damian Tsekenis	Marconi Stallions	15
5	Michael Krslovic	Sydney United 58 FC	13
6	Travis Major	Blacktown City FC	11

=== Discipline ===
==== Yellow Cards ====
Rank	Player	Team	Yellow Cards
1	Cooper Hanagan	SD Raiders	12
2	Lachlan Campbell	UNSW FC	10
2	Christopher McStay	St George FC	10
3	Luke Nieuwenhof	Manly United FC	9
4	Teng Kuol	Marconi Stallions	8
4	Brendan Cholakian	Rockdale Ilinden	8
4	Reo Kunimoto	Rockdale Ilinden	8
5	Adrian Vlastelica	Sydney United 58 FC	7
5	Nicholas O'Brien	Blacktown City	7
5	Maksim Jez	Blacktown City	7
5	Sebastian Duarte	Wollongong Wolves	7

==== Red Cards ====
Rank	Player	Team	Red Cards
1	Nicholas O'Brien	Blacktown City	2
1	Anton Mlinaric	Marconi Stallions	2
1	Nathan Roberts	UNSW FC	2
1	Cooper Hanagan	SD Raiders	2
2	30 players		1

== See also ==
- 2026 National Premier Leagues NSW Women's
