= Mwata =

Mwata or Muata may refer to the following people

- Mwata Bowden (born 1947), American jazz reeds player
- Mwata "Gotti" Mitchell, American rapper; member of Boo & Gotti
- Mwata Yamvo, 16th-century ruler of the Lunda Kingdom in the Democratic Republic of Congo
- Themba Muata-Marlow (born 1994), Australian/English footballer of Jamaican ancestry
