= Awan Lual =

Australian soccer player (born 2006)

Personal information
- Date of birth: 16 December 2006 (age 19)
- Place of birth: Kenya
- Height: 1.86 m (6 ft 1 in)
- Position: Forward

Team information
- Current team: Western Sydney Wanderers
- Number: 19

Youth career
- Blacktown Spartans
- 2023–2024: Western Sydney Wanderers

Senior career*
Years	Team	Apps	(Gls)
2023–	Western Sydney Wanderers (NPL)	71	(32)
2024–	Western Sydney Wanderers	13	(1)
- * Club domestic league appearances and goals as of 16 October 2026

Awan Lual (born 16 December 2006) is a professional soccer player who plays as a forward for A-League Men club Western Sydney Wanderers.

== Early and personal life ==
Lual was born on 16 December 2006 in a refugee camp in Kenya to parents from South Sudan. His father, Lual Awan Lueth, was considered a "war hero" during the civil war before his family fled to Sydney, Australia when Lual was one year of age. Raised in Mount Druitt, a suburb in Western Sydney, Lual is the third-eldest child out of eight children. As a child, he grew up playing soccer with his older brother, Lueth Awan, and idolised Ivorian soccer player Didier Drogba. His older brother also played basketball and signed for NBL team Sydney Kings in August 2026. His father was an air traffic controller at Sydney Airport.

On 22 October 2024, Lual's father was killed in a car accident on the Great Western Highway at St Marys. The driver, Edgar Stephen Haufano, was found intoxicated on meth and plead guilty for manslaughter at court in August 2026.

== Career ==
=== Western Sydney Wanderers ===
Lual began his youth career at Blacktown Spartans and Western Sydney Wanderers in NPL. In his first season with the Wanderers, he scored 20 goals in 38 appearances for both the under-18 and under-20 teams. He was included in the senior squad for the 2024 season and scored his first senior goal in a 2–1 win over Hills United on 24 February 2024. He managed two goals in 16 league appearances by July with five games left in the season. In the 2024 Australia Cup, Lual made his first-team debut against Brisbane City in the Round of 32. After the 2025 season with the NPL squad, Lual made his A-League Men debut on 18 October 2025 against Melbourne City. He scored his first professional goal in a 2–1 home loss to Newcastle Jets on 16 January 2026. With one goal in nine appearances in the 2025–26 season, he signed on a three-year scholarship contract in February.

Lual was included in the squad for the 2026 NPL NSW season and was awarded the league's Golden Boot with 21 goals. Lual scored his first hat-trick of the season in a 4–0 win over Sydney Olympic on 21 March 2026. He scored another hat-trick with four goals and his 13th of the campaign in a 6–0 win over Sydney FC on 29 May to lead as the top goalscorer of the league. By his 20th league appearance at the end of July, Lual recorded 17 goals and led the Golden Boot over Damian Tsekenis by two goals. He scored his 20th goal on 1 August against UNSW FC and became the youngest player to score 20 goals in NPL NSW Men's history at the age of 19 years and 234 days. Lual added one more goal to his tally on the last game of the season in a 3–1 win over Blacktown City. Along with the Golden Boot, he was named in the men's Team of the Year for NPL NSW.

For the 2026–27 season in the A-League, Lual suffered a hamstring injury in the first-half of the Sydney Derby in the first league match of the season.
