= 2010 NSW Premier League season =

NSW Premier League 2010
- League: NSW Premier League
- Sport: Association football
- Duration: 27 February – 29 August
- Teams: 12

2010
- Champions: Blacktown
- Premiers: Bonnyrigg White Eagles
- Top scorer: (Australia) Tolgay Ozbey (25); Blacktown

2010 Waratah Cup
- Champions: Marconi Stallions

NSW Premier League seasons
- ← 2009 2011 →

The 2010 NSW Premier League season was the 10th season of the revamped NSW Premier League. This season also marked the addition of a new team, in the Rockdale City Suns Football Club from the Super League (one division lower).

The 2010 season began on 27 February with the first two games being played.

Throughout the season, the Waratah Cup was once again contested, with competing teams from the Premier League, Super League, Division One and Division Two.

== Clubs ==
Teams promoted from Super League:
(After the end of the 2009 season.)

- Rockdale City Suns

Teams relegated to Super League:
(After the end of the 2009 season.)

- Penrith Nepean United (now defunct)

Club	Ground	Capacity
APIA Tigers	Leichhardt Oval	20,000
Bankstown City Lions FC	Jensen Oval	5,000
Blacktown City Demons FC	Lily Homes Stadium	7,500
Bonnyrigg White Eagles FC	Bonnyrigg Sports Club	5,000
Manly United FC	Cromer Park	5,000
Marconi Stallions FC	Marconi Stadium	11,500
Rockdale City Suns FC	Bicentennial Park South	5,000
South Coast Wolves FC	WIN Stadium	20,000
Sutherland Sharks FC	Seymour Shaw Park	5,000
Sydney Olympic FC	Belmore Sports Ground	25,000
Sydney United FC	Sydney United Sports Centre	12,000
West Sydney Berries FC	Sydney Olympic Park Athletic Centre	18,000

=== Managerial changes ===
Team	Outgoing	Manner	Date	Incoming	Date
Sydney United FC	(Australia) Ante Milicic	Mutual Agreement	18 November 2009	(Australia) David Zdrilic	4 December 2009
Blacktown City Demons FC	(Australia) Ken Schembri	Resigned	15 October 2009	(Australia) Aytek Genc	15 October 2009
Manly United	(Australia) Phil Moss	Moved to CCM as assistant coach to Graham Arnold.	14 May 2010	(England) Craig Midgley	14 May 2010

== Regular season ==
=== League table ===
Pos	Team	Pld	W	D	L	GF	GA	GD	Pts	Qualification or relegation
1	Bonnyrigg White Eagles	22	13	6	3	45	20	+25	45	Qualified for the 2010 NSW Premier League Finals
2	Blacktown City (C)	22	12	4	6	42	27	+15	40	Qualified for the 2010 NSW Premier League Finals
3	Sydney United	22	11	6	5	39	26	+13	39	Qualified for the 2010 NSW Premier League Finals
4	APIA Leichhardt Tigers	22	12	3	7	39	37	+2	39	Qualified for the 2010 NSW Premier League Finals
5	Marconi Stallions	22	11	3	8	26	26	0	36	Qualified for the 2010 NSW Premier League Finals
6	Sutherland Sharks	22	9	4	9	36	29	+7	31	
7	Rockdale City Suns	22	6	12	4	23	23	0	30	
8	Bankstown City	22	7	5	10	37	41	−4	26	
9	Manly United	22	7	4	11	24	31	−7	25	
10	South Coast Wolves	22	6	4	12	32	39	−7	22	
11	Sydney Olympic	22	6	3	13	29	40	−11	21	
12	West Sydney Berries (R)	22	2	6	14	17	50	−33	12	Relegated to the 2011 NSW Super League

Source: socceraust.co.uk, NSW Premier League
Rules for classification: 1) points; 2) goal difference; 3) number of goals scored.
(C) Champions; (R) Relegated

== Results ==
=== Round 1 ===
Time	Home team	Score	Away team	Venue
Sat 27 February, 7:00pm	Bonnyrigg White Eagles	2–1	South Coast Wolves	Bonnyrigg Sports Club
Sat 27 February, 7:30pm	Marconi Stallions	1–0	West Sydney Berries	Marconi Stadium
Sun 28 February, 6:00pm	Sydney Olympic	2–0	Sutherland Sharks	Belmore Sports Ground
Sun 28 February, 6:00pm	Bansktown City Lions	2–2	Manly United FC	Jensen Oval
Sun 28 February, 6:00pm	Blacktown City FC	1–0	APIA Leichhardt Tigers	Lily Homes Stadium
Sun 28 February, 6:00pm	Sydney United	4–1	Rockdale City Suns FC	Sydney United Sports Centre

=== Round 2 ===
Time	Home team	Score	Away team	Venue
Sat 6 March, 6:30pm	South Coast Wolves	1–2	Marconi Stadium	WIN Stadium
Sat 6 March, 7:00pm	Sydney Olympic	0–1	Sydney United	Belmore Sports Ground
Sat 6 March, 7:00pm	Bonnyrigg White Eagles	4–1	APIA Leichhardt Tigers	Bonnyrigg Sports Club
Sun 7 March, 5:00pm	Rockdale City Suns FC	1–0	Bankstown City Lions	Bicentennial Park South
Sun 7 March, 6:00pm	Manly United FC	0–2	Blacktown City FC	Cromer Park
Sun 7 March, 6:00pm	West Sydney Berries	2–1	Sutherland Sharks	Sydney Olympic Park Athletic Centre

=== Round 3 ===
Time	Home team	Score	Away team	Venue
Sat 13 March, 7:00pm	Sutherland Sharks	2–1	South Coast Wolves	Seymour Shaw Park
Sat 13 March, 7:30pm	Marconi Stallions	0–0	Bonnyrigg White Eagles	Marconi Stadium
Sun 14 March, 6:00pm	Bankstown City	2–2	Sydney United	Jensen Oval
Sun 14 March, 6:00pm	APIA Leichhardt Tigers	0–3	Manly United FC	Leichhardt Oval
Sun 14 March, 6:00pm	Blacktown City FC	2–2	Rockdale City Suns	Lily Homes Stadium
Sun 14 March, 6:00pm	Sydney United	1–1	West Sydney Berries	Sydney United Sports Centre

=== Round 4 ===
Time	Home team	Score	Away team	Venue
Sat 20 March, 7:00pm	Bonnyrigg White Eagles	1–1	Sutherland Sharks	Bonnyrigg Sports Club
Sat 20 March, 7:30pm	Marconi Stallions	2–1	APIA Leichhardt Tigers	Marconi Stadium
Sun 21 March, 5:00pm	Rockdale City	1–1	Manly United FC	Bicentennial Park South
Sun 21 March, 6:00pm	Sydney Olympic	1–4	Blacktown City FC	Belmore Sports Ground
Sun 21 March, 6:00pm	Sydney United	2–2	South Coast Wolves	Sydney United Sports Centre
Sun 21 March, 7:00pm	West Sydney Berries	1–5	Bankstown City FC	Jensen Oval

=== Round 5 ===
Time	Home team	Score	Away team	Venue
Sat 27 March, 12:30pm	Sydney United	1–2	Bonnyrigg White Eagles	Sydney United Sports Centre
Sat 27 March, 7:00pm	Sutherland Sharks	0–1	Marconi Stallions	Seymour Shaw Park
Sun 28 March, 5:00pm	APIA Leichhardt Tigers	2–2	Rockdale City Suns	Leichhardt Oval
Sun 28 March, 6:00pm	Manly United FC	2–1	Sydney Olympic	Cromer Park
Sun 28 March, 6:00pm	Bankstown City	2–3	South Coast Wolves	Jensen Oval
Sun 28 March, 6:00pm	Blacktown City FC	1–0	West Sydney Berries	Lily Homes Stadium

=== Round 6 ===
Time	Home team	Score	Away team	Venue
Sat 3 April, 6:00pm	West Sydney Berries	3–2	Manly United FC	Sydney Olympic Park Athletic Centre
Sat 3 April, 6:30pm	South Coast Wolves	2–2	Blacktown City FC	WIN Stadium
Sat 3 April, 7:00pm	Bonnyrigg White Eagles	4–1	Bankstown City	Bonnyrigg Sports Club
Sat 3 April, 7:00pm	Sutherland Sharks	5–1	APIA Leichhardt Tigers	Seymour Shaw Park
Sat 3 April, 7:30pm	Marconi Stallions	0–3	Sydney United	Marconi Stadium
Mon 5 April, 5:00pm	Sydney Olympic	0–1	Rockdale City Suns	Belmore Sports Ground

=== Round 7 ===
Time	Home team	Score	Away team	Venue
Sun 11 April, 3:00pm	Rockdale City Suns	1–1	West Sydney Berries	Bicentennial Park South
Sun 11 April, 3:00pm	Manly United FC	0–1	South Coast Wolves	Cromer Park
Sun 11 April, 3:00pm	Bankstown City Lions Football Club	1–3	Marconi Stallions	Jensen Oval
Sun 11 April, 3:00pm	APIA Leichhardt Tigers	2–1	Sydney Olympic	Leichhardt Oval
Sun 11 April, 4:00pm	Blacktown City FC	2–7	Bonnyrigg White Eagles	Lily Homes Stadium
Sun 11 April, 4:00 pm	Sydney United	3–1	Sutherland Sharks	Sydney United Sports Centre

=== Round 8 ===
Time	Home team	Score	Away team	Venue
Sat 17 April, 7:00pm	Bonnyrigg White Eagles	1–1	Manly United FC	Bonnyrigg Sports Club
Sat 17 April, 7:00pm	Sutherland Sharks	0–3	Bankstown City Lions Football Club	Seymour Shaw Park
Sat 17 April, 7:30pm	Marconi Stallions	0–0	Blacktown City FC	Marconi Stadium
Sun 18 April, 3:00pm	Sydney Olympic	2–0	West Sydney Berries	Belmore Sports Ground
Sun 18 April, 3:00pm	South Coast Wolves	1–2	Rockdale City Suns	WIN Stadium
Sun 18 April, 4:00pm	Sydney United	2–0	APIA Leichhardt Tigers	Sydney United Sports Centre

=== Round 9 ===
Time	Home team	Score	Away team	Venue
Sun 25 April, 3:00pm	Rockdale City Suns	1–2	Bonnyrigg White Eagles	Bicentennial Park South
Sun 25 April, 3:00pm	Manly United FC	0–1	Marconi Stallions	Cromer Park
Sun 25 April, 3:00pm	APIA Leichhardt Tigers	4–0	West Sydney Berries	Leichhardt Oval
Sun 25 April, 4:00pm	Sydney Olympic	4–2	South Coast Wolves	Belmore Sports Ground
Sun 25 April, 4:00pm	Blacktown City FC	0–2	Sutherland Sharks	Lily Homes Stadium
Sun 25 April, 6:00pm	Bankstown City Lions Football Club	0–3	Sydney United	Jensen Oval

=== Round 10 ===
Time	Home team	Score	Away team	Venue
Sat 1 May, 7:00pm	Bonnyrigg White Eagles	4–2	Sydney Olympic	Bonnyrigg Sports Club
Sat 1 May, 7:00pm	Sutherland Sharks	3–0	Manly United FC	Seymour Shaw Park
Sat 1 May, 7:30pm	Marconi Stallions	1–0	Rockdale City Suns	Marconi Stadium
Sun 2 May, 3:00pm	Bankstown City Lions	1–2	APIA Leichhardt Tigers	Jensen Oval
Sun 2 May, 3:00pm	West Sydney Berries	0–0	South Coast Wolves	Sydney Olympic Park Athletic Centre
Sun 2 May, 4:00pm	Sydney United	2–3	Blacktown City FC	Sydney Olympic Park Sports Centre

=== Round 11 ===
Time	Home team	Score	Away team	Venue
Sat 6 May, 6:00pm	Sydney Olympic	2–3	Marconi Stallions	Belmore Sports Ground
Sun 7 May, 3:00pm	Rockdale City Suns	0–0	Sutherland Sharks	Bicentennial Park South
Sun 7 May, 3:00pm	Manly United FC	0–2	Sydney United	Cromer Park
Sun 7 May, 3:00pm	West Sydney Berries	1–1	Bonnyrigg White Eagles	Sydney Olympic Park Athletic Centre
Sun 7 May, 3:00pm	South Coast Wolves	0–1	APIA Leichhardt Tigers	WIN Stadium
Sun 7 May, 4:00pm	Blacktown City FC	2–1	Bankstown City Lions	Lily Homes Stadium

=== Round 12 ===
Time	Home team	Score	Away team	Venue
Sat 15 May, 7:00pm	Sutherland Sharks	2–1	Sydney Olympic	Seymour Shaw Park
Sun 16 May, 3:00pm	Rockdale City Suns	1–1	Sydney United	Bicentennial Park South
Sun 16 May, 3:00pm	Manly United FC	1–2	Bankstown City Lions Football Club	Cromer Park
Sun 16 May, 3:00pm	APIA Leichhardt Tigers	3–2	Blacktown City FC	Leichhardt Oval
Sun 16 May, 3:00pm	West Sydney Berries	1–2	Marconi Stallions	Sydney Olympic Park Athletic Centre
Sun 16 May, 3:00pm	South Coast Wolves	1–3	Bonnyrigg White Eagles	WIN Stadium

=== Round 13 ===
Time	Home team	Score	Away team	Venue
Sat 22 May, 7:00pm	Sutherland Sharks	4–1	West Sydney Berries	Seymour Shaw Park
Sat 22 May, 7:30pm	Marconi Stallions	1–2	South Coast Wolves Football Club	Marconi Stadium
Sun 23 May, 3:00pm	Bankstown City Lions	0–1	Rockdale City Suns	Jensen Oval
Sun 23 May, 3:00pm	APIA Leichhardt Tigers	2–2	Bonnyrigg White Eagles	Leichhardt Oval
Sun 23 May, 4:00pm	Blacktown City FC	0–2	Manly United FC	Lily Homes Stadium
Sun 23 May, 4:00pm	Sydney United	1–1	Sydney Olympic	Sydney United Sports Centre

=== Round 14 ===
Time	Home team	Score	Away team	Venue
Sat 29 May, 7:00pm	Bonnyrigg White Eagles	2–0	Marconi Stallions	Bonnyrigg Sports Club
Sun 30 May, 3:00pm	Sydney Olympic	1–2	Bankstown City Lions	Belmore Sports Ground
Sun 30 May, 3:00pm	Rockdale City Suns	0–0	Blacktown City FC	Bicentennial Park South
Sun 30 May, 7:00pm	West Sydney Berries	1–1	Sydney United	Sydney Olympic Park Athletic Centre
Sun 30 May, 7:00pm	South Coast Wolves	0–3	Sutherland Sharks	WIN Stadium
Tue 22 June, 7:30pm	Manly United FC	0–2	APIA Leichhardt Tigers	Cromer Park

=== Round 15 ===
Time	Home team	Score	Away team	Venue
Sat 5 June, 7:00pm	Sutherland Sharks	0–1	Bonnyrigg White Eagles	Seymour Shaw Park
Sun 6 June, 3:00pm	Bankstown City Lions	5–0	West Sydney Berries	Jensen Oval
Sun 6 June, 3:00pm	APIA Leichhardt Tigers	0–4	Marconi Stallions	Leichhardt Oval
Sun 6 June, 3:00pm	South Coast Wolves	0–1	Sydney United	WIN Stadium
Sun 6 June, 4:00pm	Blacktown City FC	3–1	Sydney Olympic	Lily Homes Stadium
Wed 30 June, 7:30pm	Manly United FC	0–0	Rockdale City Suns	Cromer Park

=== Round 16 ===
Time	Home team	Score	Away team	Venue
Sat 12 June, 7:00pm	Bonnyrigg White Eagles	3–0	Sydney United	Bonnyrigg Sports Club
Sat 12 June, 7:30pm	Marconi Stallions	1–2	Sutherland Sharks	Marconi Stadium
Sun 13 June, 3:00pm	Sydney Olympic	3–0	Manly United FC	Belmore Sports Ground
Sun 13 June, 3:00pm	Rockdale City Suns	2–2	APIA Leichhardt Tigers	Bicentennial Park South
Sun 13 June, 3:00pm	West Sydney Berries	1–3	Blacktown City FC	Sydney Olympic Park Athletic Centre
Sun 13 June, 3:00pm	South Coast Wolves	1–1	Bankstown City Lions	WIN Stadium

=== Round 17 ===
Time	Home team	Score	Away team	Venue
Sat 19 June, 7:00pm	Blacktown City FC	2–3	South Coast Wolves	Lily Homes Stadium
Sun 20 June, 3:00pm	APIA Leichhardt Tigers	1–0	Sutherland Sharks	Leichhardt Oval
Sun 20 June, 3:00pm	Rockdale City Suns	1–1	Sydney Olympic	Bicentennial Park South
Sun 20 June, 3:00pm	Bankstown City Lions	1–3	Bonnyrigg White Eagles	Jensen Oval
Sun 20 June, 4:00pm	Sydney United	2–0	Marconi Stallions	Sydney United Sports Centre
Sat 10 July, 7:00pm	Manly United FC	1–0	West Sydney Berries	Cromer Park

=== Round 18 ===
Time	Home team	Score	Away team	Venue
Sat 26 June, 7:00pm	Bonnyrigg White Eagles	2–0	Blacktown City FC	Bonnyrigg Sports Club
Sat 26 June, 7:00pm	Sutherland Sharks	2–2	Sydney United	Seymour Shaw Park
Sat 26 June, 7:30pm	Marconi Stallions	2–2	Bankstown City Lions	Marconi Stadium
Sun 27 June, 3:00pm	Sydney Olympic	0–2	APIA Leichhardt Tigers	Belmore Sports Ground
Sun 27 June, 3:00pm	West Sydney Berries	0–1	Rockdale City Suns	Sydney Olympic Park Athletic Centre
Sun 27 June, 3:00pm	South Coast Wolves	2–5	Manly United FC	WIN Stadium

=== Round 19 ===
Time	Home team	Score	Away team	Venue
Sun 4 July, 3:00pm	Rockdale City Suns	1–0	South Coast Wolves	Bicentennial Park South
Sun 4 July, 3:00pm	Manly United FC	0–3	Bonnyrigg White Eagles	Cromer Park
Sun 4 July, 3:00pm	Bankstown City Lions	3–3	Sutherland Sharks	Jensen Oval
Sun 4 July, 3:00pm	APIA Leichhardt Tigers	5–4	Sydney United	Leichhardt Oval
Sun 4 July, 3:00pm	Blacktown City FC	3–1	Marconi Stallions	Lily Homes Stadium
Sun 4 July, 3:00pm	West Sydney Berries	1–2	Sydney Olympic	Sydney Olympic Park Athletic Centre

=== Round 20 ===
Time	Home team	Score	Away team	Venue
Fri 9 July, 8:00pm	Sydney United	0–2	Bankstown City Lions	Sydney United Sports Centre
Sat 17 July, 7:00pm	Bonnyrigg White Eagles	1–1	Rockdale City Suns	Bonnyrigg Sports Club
Sat 17 July, 7:00pm	Sutherland Sharks	1–3	Blacktown City FC	Seymour Shaw Park
Sat 17 July, 7:30pm	Marconi Stallions	0–2	Manly United FC	Marconi Stadium
Sun 18 July, 3:00pm	West Sydney Berries	1–2	APIA Leichhardt Tigers	Sydney Olympic Park Athletic Centre
Sun 18 July, 3:00pm	South Coast Wolves	4–0	Sydney Olympic	WIN Stadium

=== Round 21 ===
Time	Home team	Score	Away team	Venue
Sat 24 July, 7:00pm	Sydney Olympic	0–1	Bonnyrigg White Eagles	Belmore Sports Ground
Sun 25 July, 3:00pm	Rockdale City Suns	2–0	Marconi Stallions	Bicentennial Park South
Sun 25 July, 3:00pm	Manly United FC	2–1	Sutherland Sharks	Cromer Park
Sun 25 July, 3:00pm	APIA Leichhardt Tigers	2–0	Bankstown City Lions	Leichhardt Oval
Sun 25 July, 3:00pm	Blacktown City FC	1–2	Sydney United	Lily Homes Stadium
Sun 25 July, 3:00pm	South Coast Wolves	5–0	West Sydney Berries	WIN Stadium

=== Round 22 ===
Time	Home team	Score	Away team	Venue
Sun 1 August, 3:00pm	Bonnyrigg White Eagles	5–1	West Sydney Berries	Bonnyrigg Sports Club
Sun 1 August, 3:00pm	Bankstown City Lions	1–6	Blacktown City FC	Jensen Oval
Sun 1 August, 3:00pm	APIA Leichhardt Tigers	3–1	South Coast Wolves	Leichhardt Oval
Sun 1 August, 3:00pm	Marconi Stallions	1–0	Sydney Olympic	Marconi Stadium
Sun 1 August, 3:00pm	Sutherland Sharks	3–1	Rockdale City Suns	Seymour Shaw Park
Sun 1 August, 3:00pm	Sydney United	1–0	Manly United FC	Sydney United Sports Centre

== Finals Series ==
Note: Minor Premiers get first week off

=== Week 1 ===
Elimination Final

Date	Home team	Score	Away team	Venue
Sun 8 August 3:00pm	APIA Leichhardt Tigers	1–0	Marconi Stallions	Leichhardt Oval

Loser is eliminated, winner goes on to face loser of Qualifying Final in week 2

Qualifying Final

Date	Home team	Score	Away team	Venue
Sun 8 August 3:00pm	Blacktown City FC	(5)1-1(4)	Sydney United	Lily Homes Stadium

Loser faces winner of Elimination Final in week 2, winner faces Minor Premiers in Semi Final 2 in week 2

=== Week 2 ===
Semi Final 1

Date	Home team	Score	Away team	Venue
Sat 14 August 7:00pm	Bonnyrigg White Eagles	0–4	Blacktown City FC	Bonnyrigg Sports Club

Winner goes to Grand Final loser faces winner of Semi Final 2 in Grand Final Qualifier in week 3

Semi Final 2

Date	Home team	Score	Away team	Winner
Sun 15 August 3:00pm	Sydney United	2–0(aet)	APIA Leichhardt Tigers	Sydney United Sports Centre

Loser is eliminated, winner goes on to play loser of Semi Final 2 in Grand Final Qualifier in week 3

=== Week 3 ===
Preliminary Final

Date	Home team	Score	Away team	Venue
Sun 22 August 3:00pm	Bonnyrigg White Eagles	3–1	Sydney United	Bonnyrigg Sports Club

Loser is eliminated, winner goes through to Grand Final

=== Week 4 ===
Grand Final

Date	Home team	Score	Away team	Venue
Sun 29 August 3:00pm	Blacktown City FC	1–0	Bonnyrigg White Eagles	Parramatta Stadium

== Top goalscorers ==
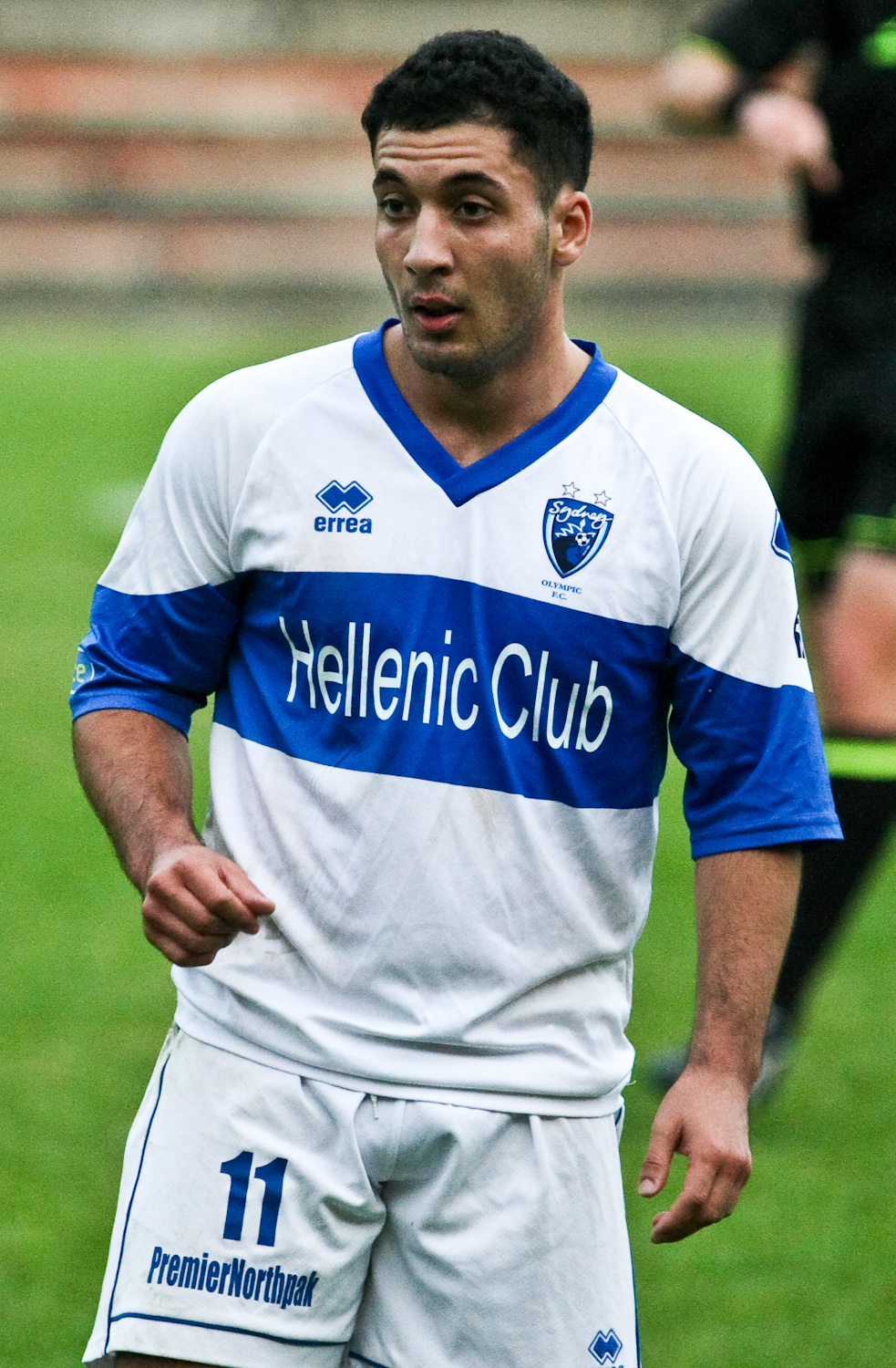
Tolgay Ozbey won the Golden Boot with 23 goals

Rank	Player	Goals	Team
1	(Australia) Tolgay Ozbey	23	Blacktown City FC
2	(Australia) Eslid Barkhousir	14	Sydney United
2	(Australia) Brad Boardman	14	Bonnyrigg White Eagles
2	(Australia) Robbie Younis	14	APIA Leichhardt Tigers
5	(Australia) Daniel Severino	12	Bonnyrigg White Eagles
6	(Australia) Luka Glavas	11	Sydney United
6	(Australia) Robbie Mileski	11	Bankstown City Lions
8	(Australia) Mark Picciolini	10	South Coast Wolves
9	(Australia) Joel Chianese	8	Blacktown City Demons
9	(Australia) Ante Duer	8	Blacktown City Demons
Source: socceraust.co.uk. Last updated 8 August 2015

== Statistics ==
=== Attendances ===
These are the attendance records of each of the teams at the end of the home and away season. The table does not include finals series attendances.

Team	Hosted	Average	Highest	Lowest	Total
Sydney Olympic FC	11	894	1,754	435	22,198
Bonnyrigg White Eagles FC	11	831	1,350	550	10,615
Sutherland Sharks FC	11	752	1,504	400	9372
Sydney United FC	11	545	1,100	360	8,754
Marconi Stallions FC	11	533	1,004	450	6,633
Bankstown City Lions FC	11	524	750	300	6,094
Wollongong Community FC	11	504	1,189	250	6,089
Blacktown City Demons FC	11	387	1,000	150	4,257
APIA Tigers	11	460	1,250	300	5,060
Rockdale City Suns FC	11	825	1,100	550	9,075
Manly United FC	11	373	850	100	4,100
West Sydney Berries FC	11	185	550	150	2035

== See also ==
- NSW Premier League
- Football NSW
