= Rockdale Bicentennial Park =

Park in Sydney, Australia

Coordinates: 33.96314°S 151.14555°E

Bicentennial Park is a recreational area in Rockdale, a suburb of Sydney in New South Wales, Australia. It features a bike track, athletics facilities and soccer and rugby league grounds. The park is divided into three sections known as Bicentennial Park North, Bicentennial Park South and Bicentennial Park East. Two ponds are linked by a creek to more wetlands in Scarborough park, to the south. A footbridge over the ponds links Bicentennial Park East to the rest of the recreational area.

Bicentennial Park opened in 1988 and was named in honour of Australia's Bicentenary in that year. Bicentennial Park South Football Stadium opened in 2009 in time for the 2009 NSW Super League season. The Rockdale Ilinden Football Club became a tenant for 21 years. Geographically, Bicentennial Park East is located on the border of three suburbs, Monterey, Rockdale and Brighton-Le-Sands, but is officially in Brighton-Le-Sands according to the Geographical Names Board of New South Wales. It features two large soccer fields and one smaller one for juniors. Cricket pitches in the centre of the two large fields have been constructed for use in summer.

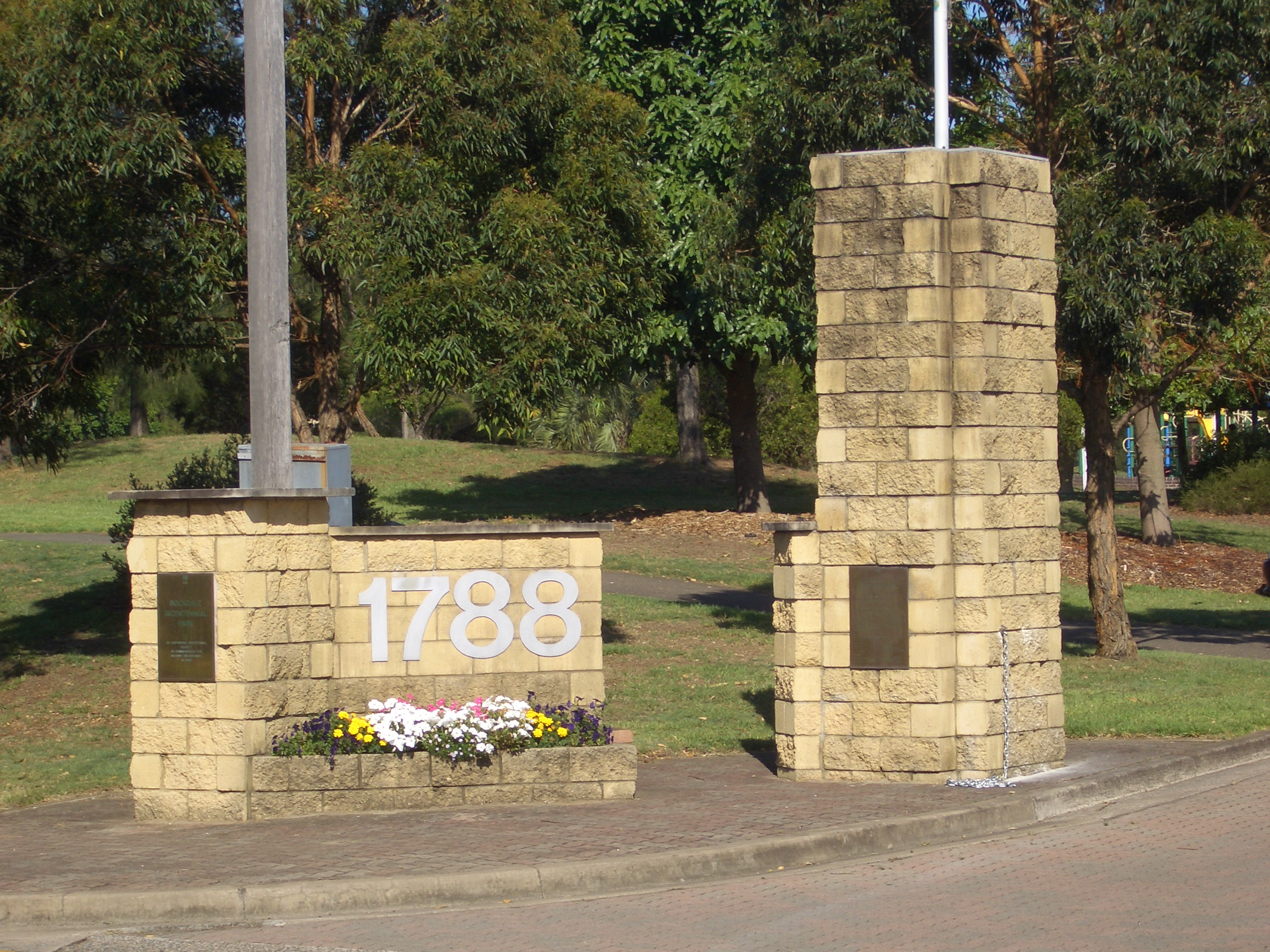
Bicentennial Park

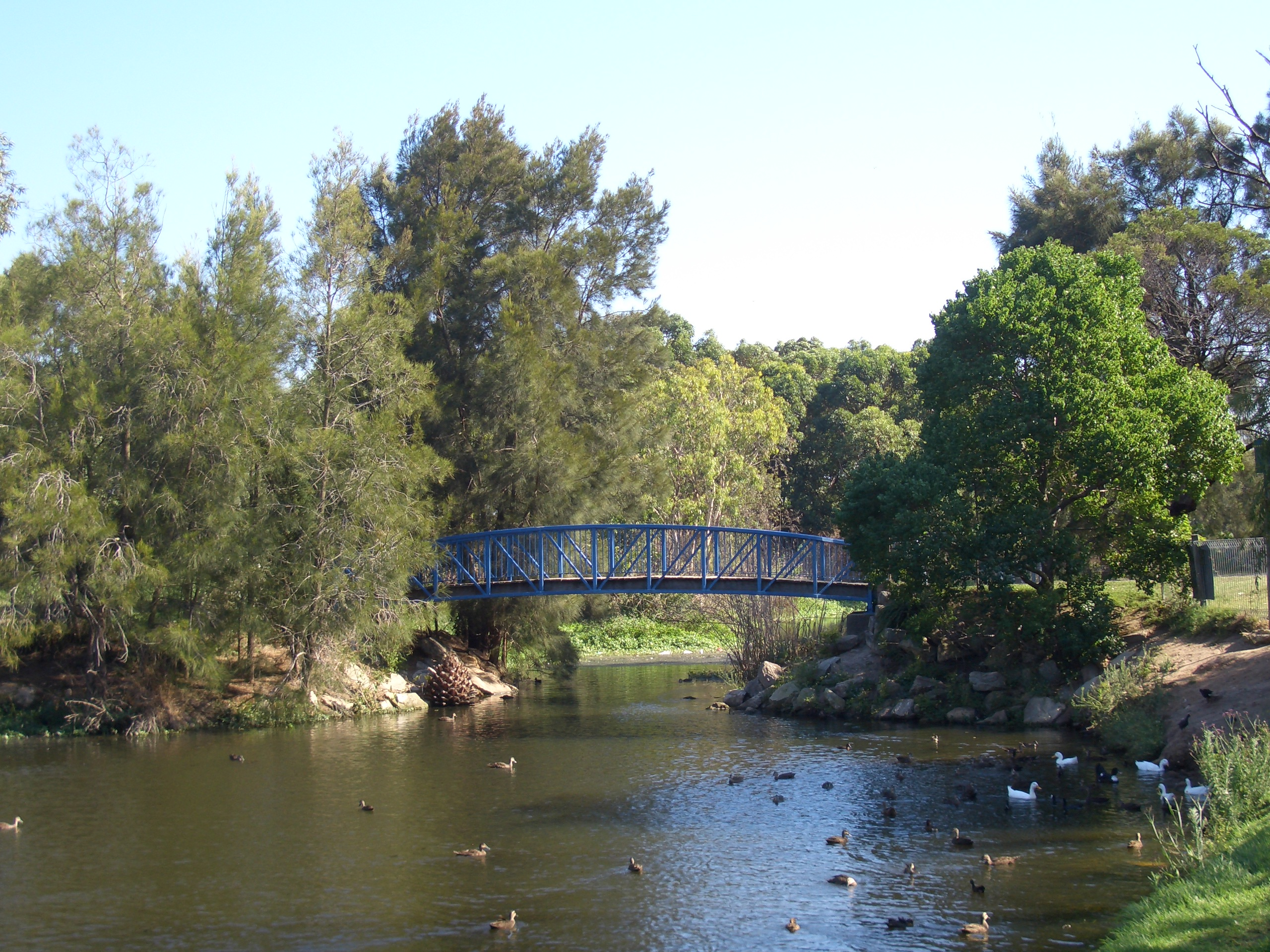
Bicentennial Park

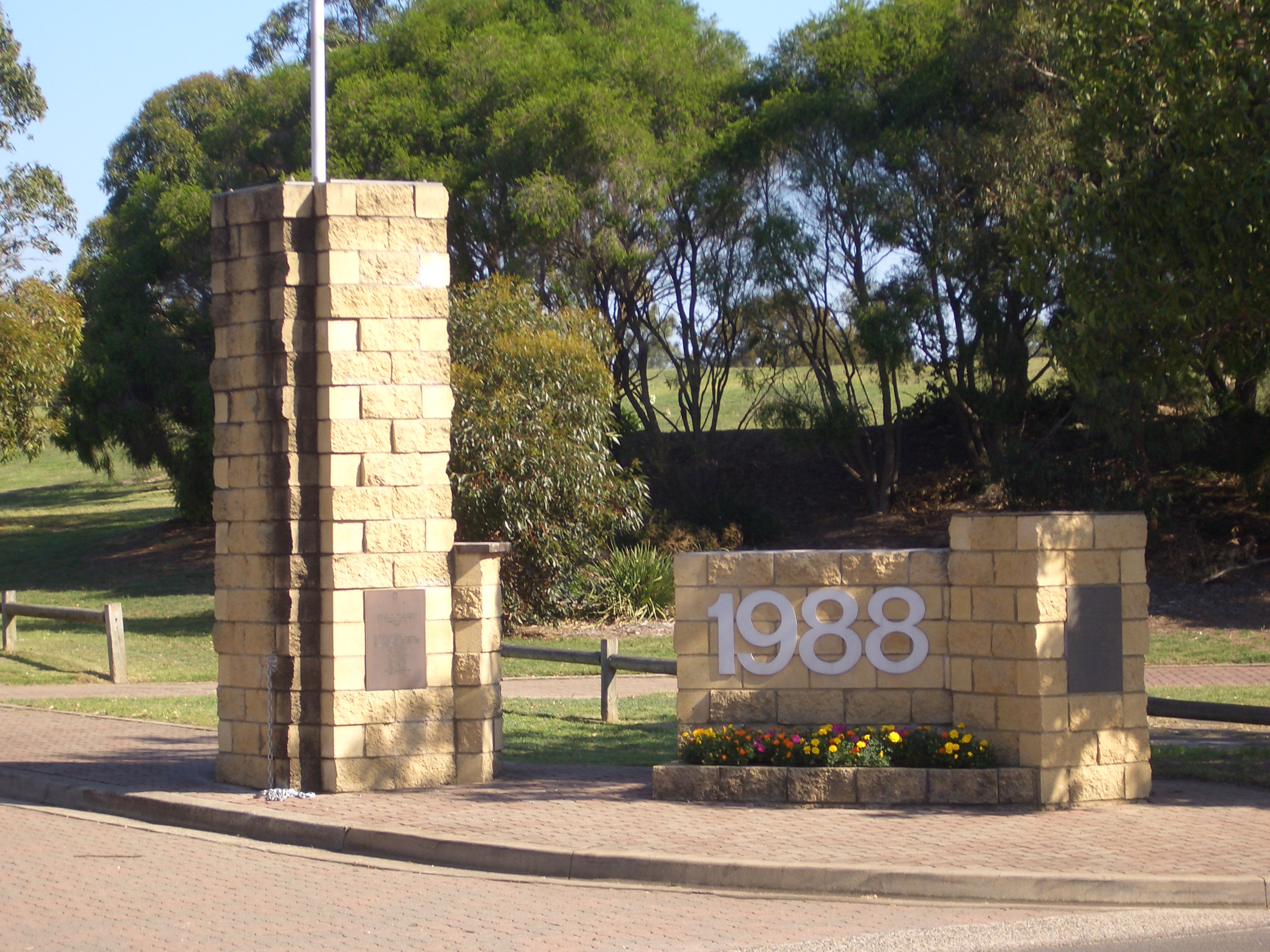
Bicentennial Park
