= Rockdale Ilinden Sports Centre (Arncliffe, New South Wales) =

Sports venue in Arncliffe, New South Wales

Rockdale Ilinden Sports Centre (Old Ground)
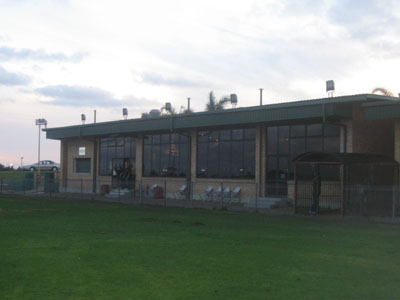
- Interactive map of Rockdale Ilinden Sports Centre (Old Ground)
- Location: 210 West Botany St, Arncliffe, New South Wales
- Coordinates: 33°56′34″S 151°9′28″E
- Owner: Bayside Council
- Capacity: 5,000
- Surface: Grass

Construction
- Opened: 1969
- Demolished: 2025

Tenant
- Rockdale City Suns (NSWSL) (1969-2009)

Rockdale Ilinden Sports Centre was located on the grounds of Barton Park in Arncliffe, New South Wales in Australia. It was the home ground of the Rockdale Ilinden Football Club, who played in the New South Wales Super League.

A new Rockdale Ilinden Sports Centre has been constructed at Bicentennial Park South, 468 West Botany Street, Rockdale. It is the home of the Rockdale City Suns Football Club.

The old centre is located near St George Stadium, a football ground used by the St. George Saints. St George Stadium was not used during 2007-2008, but has started to be used again in 2009. Despite this re-use, Rockdale Ilinden is still used as the venue for many St. George Saints local division finals pending Rockdale Ilinden's move.

The old Ilinden Sports Centre contains the Clubhouse which has hosted numerous functions - of which have included mainly Macedonian-orientated non-soccer related functions. The ground boasts an indoor/outdoor licensed canteen, proper home & away change rooms, ample grass and bitumen parking, two superior playing surfaces (main and training), two other soccer ovals and two makeshift baseball arenas.

== Rockdale City Suns ==
The Rockdale Ilinden Football Club played at the Sports Centre for 40 years after their Australian birth. They won premierships there and developed their mainly Macedonian traditions, and celebrated their 40th anniversary year in 2009 with a minor premiership in the NSW Super League. Over time however, the Rockdale Ilinden Sports Centre has become worn out, and the club bought a lease for Bicentennial Park South, which was re-developed in 2009 as the new home of the Rockdale City Suns. The new facilities were officially opened on Saturday, 12 December 2009.

== Cook Cove Development ==
A joint venture between developer John Boyd and Westpac Funds Management has begun construction of a A$1.7 billion dollar project titled the Cook Cove Development near Sydney Airport. The 270,000 square meter area will contain offices, a hotel and a retail precinct on the current Kogarah Golf Club grounds, with the Golf Club relocating nearby south to Barton Park after related Bicentennial and Scarborough Park upgrade takes place, relocating sporting teams further south for this construction to happen. The move is planned to take place in late 2009 to early 2010, after being originally slated for early in 2009.
