= Brian Brown (football coach) =

Scottish-born Australian footballer and coach

Personal information
- Date of birth: 23 March 1957 (age 69)
- Place of birth: Falkirk, Scotland
- Position: Defender

Youth career
- Gairdoch United FC

Senior career*
Years	Team	Apps	(Gls)
1975–1977	Dumbarton	8	(0)
1977–1984	Falkirk F.C.	269	(30)
1984–1988	Brunswick Juventus	106	(4)

Managerial career
- 1999–2005: Blacktown City FC
- 2006–2007: Marconi Stallions FC
- 2008: Sutherland Sharks FC
- 2009–2018: Bonnyrigg White Eagles FC
- 2021–2022: Hills United FC
- 2023: Bonnyrigg White Eagles FC
- 2023–2026: St George U20
- 2026–: St George
- * Club domestic league appearances and goals

Brian "Bomber" Brown is a Scottish-born Australian football player and coach. Brown's professional career started at Dumbarton FC, before he moved to Falkirk FC and later to Australia with Brunswick Juventus in the National Soccer League. Brown was the recent head coach of Blacktown City FC, Marconi Stallions FC, Sutherland Sharks FC, Hills United FC and Bonnyrigg White Eagles. Brown is currently head coach of NPL NSW team St George FC.

== Football career ==
Brown started his career with Dumbarton FC making his professional debut as a 17-year-old. In 1977, Brown was transferred to his boyhood club, Falkirk FC, where he would quickly become a fan favorite. Brown was made club captain and went on to feature in 269 games, scoring 30 goals and being inducting into the Falkirk FC Hall of Fame in 2001.

In 1984, Brown moved to Australia to play for Brunswick Juventus in the National Soccer League. In his second year with Brunswick, Brown was made captain and quickly established himself as one of Australia's best defenders.

During Brown's time, Brunswick Juventus claimed silverware three times and in 1985 were crowned champions of Australia, defeating Heidelberg United, South Melbourne and Preston Makedonia in the Southern Conference play-offs before defeating Sydney City over two legs in the Grand Final.

Brown played for three more seasons until officially retiring in 1988. He would later take up an assistant coach role with Brunswick Juventus in 1991 before moving to New Zealand with his family.

In 1999, Brown would take up the head coach position with NSW State League giants Blacktown City FC. During Brown's time at Blacktown City FC, they would feature in 6 consecutive Grand Finals (winning 2) and claiming 4 Minor Premierships.

Following the end of the 2005 season, Brown moved to take up the head coach position with Australian giants Marconi Stallions. After 2 seasons with Marconi, Brown moved to Sutherland Sharks FC and would claim the Championship defeating his former club Marconi Stallions in 2008.

He would later be offered an assistant role at A-League club North Queensland Fury but turned it down.

In 2009, Brown made the switch to Bonnyrigg White Eagles FC and claimed Premierships in the 2010 and 2012, as well as Championships in 2013 and 2015, defeating Rockdale City Suns FC and Blacktown City FC respectively.

Since 1999, Brown has accumulated over 400 games as a coach in the NSW Premier League. His teams have featured in 10 Grand Finals and been Minor Premiers 8 times. He is regarded as one of the best coaches ever involved in the competition and has been voted the leagues "Coach of the Year" a record 6 times.

== Honours ==
=== Manager Career ===
- Blacktown City FC
  - NSW Super League Champions: 1999, 2000
  - NSW Super League Premiers: 2000
  - NSW Premier League Premiers: 2000/1, 2002/3, 2004/5
- Sutherland Sharks FC
  - NSW Premier League Champions: 2008
- Bonnyrigg White Eagles
  - NSW Premier League Premiers: 2010, 2012, 2014
  - NSW Premier League Champions: 2013, 2015

=== Player Career ===
- Brunswick Juventus
  - Victorian Premier League Champions: 1991
  - Victorian Premier League Runners Up: 1990
  - National Soccer League Champions: 1985

=== Personal Honours ===
Falkirk FC Hall of Fame (inducted 2001)

Falkirk FC Player of the Year: 1978/79

NSW Premier League Coach of the Season – 2000, 2001, 2003, 2008, 2010, 2012

=== Representative Honours ===
NSW XI Representative Coaching – 2000, 2001 & 2003
