= Bicentennial Park (Hillsboro, Oregon) =

Neighborhood park in Hillsboro, Oregon

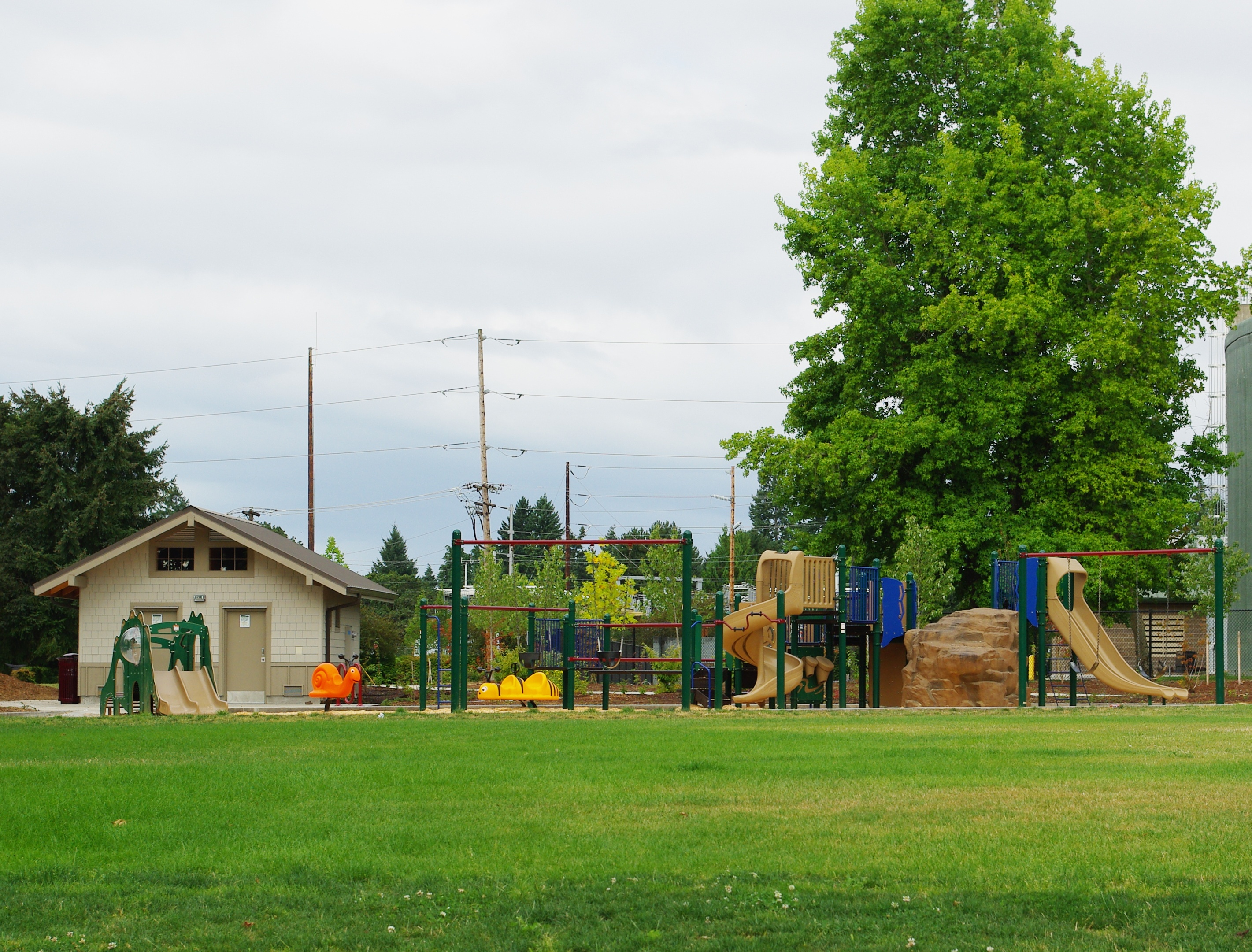
- Playground at the park
- Interactive map of Bicentennial Park
- Type: Public, city
- Location: Hillsboro, Oregon; United States
- Coordinates: 45°31′18″N 122°57′29″W
- Area: 4.4 acres (18,000 m^{2})
- Created: 1976
- Operator: Hillsboro Parks & Recreation Department
- Status: Open
- Website: Bicentennial Park

Bicentennial Park is a neighborhood park in Hillsboro in the U.S. state of Oregon. Opened in 1976, it is named for the United States' Bicentennial and also honors the city's one-hundredth year as a city. Located at northeast 25th Avenue and Parkwood, the park covers about 4 acres (1.6 ha) and includes a water reservoir, a fire station, a playground, and a soccer field among other amenities.

== History ==
By 1962 the city had purchased a 6.2-acre plot of land between northeast 24th and 25th streets at Parkwood to use in part for a water reservoir. In December 1962, the roof collapsed on the water tower while workers were attempting to complete the dome, killing five people. The Hillsboro Utilities Commission gave the land where the tower was located to the parks department to build a park at the site in 1975.

On June 26, 1976, Hillsboro's planning commission approved adding a temporary fire station on one-third of an acre of land at 25th Avenue and Parkwood, where a park would also be located. Neighbors protested the decision due to concerns over noise and safety, and the city postponed a final decision on adding the fire station to the planned 4.4-acre (1.8 ha) park. The city approved both the park and the temporary fire station in October 1976. The temporary fire station then opened in 1977.

That year Hillsboro received a grant from the American Revolution Bicentennial Commission in the amount of $2,500 for development of a soccer field; the city matched the grant with city funds to further develop the park. Plans called for a soccer field, trails, and a playground, in addition to the fire station and water reservoir on the park grounds.

On October 19, 1976, the city officially dedicated the still-undeveloped Bicentennial Park in a ceremony on the city's one-hundredth birthday. The dedication ceremony included mayor Miller M. Duris, Oregon Governor Robert Straub, and chairman of the parks and recreation commission, Will Crandall, along with about 100 others. Although named Bicentennial Park, the park was said to be a monument to Hillsboro's centennial, as one-hundred years prior to the dedication, the community was officially incorporated by the state. At that time a sign was installed at the park, provided by the Jaycee-ettes.

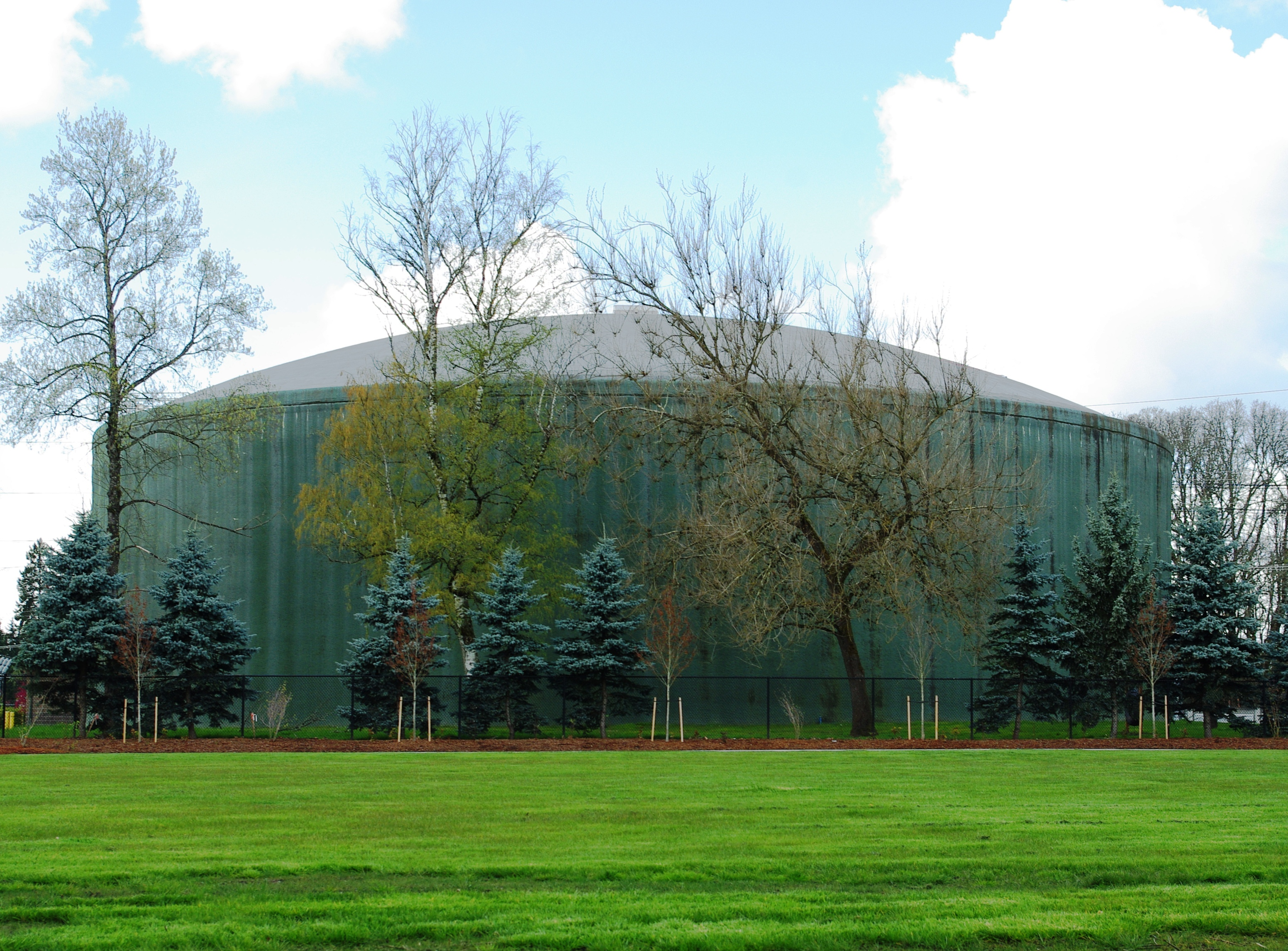
Water tower at the park

Later that year the Hillsboro Jaycees announced they would provide further improvements to the park starting in 1977. There project would start with the installation of $5,500 in play equipment in March, and later add park benches, picnic tables, fire pits, a picnic shelter, and restrooms. The soccer field opened in 1978, as did the picnic shelter and playground.

In August 1984, the park was the site of several soccer matches between West German youth soccer team TSU Reichenbach and a team made up of Hillsboro High School and Glencoe High School players. The Hillsboro teams lost both games against the 18-year-old Germans. The water tower was upgraded in 2005 after issues with the soil had been discovered in 2001 that forced the city to keep the reservoir only half-full.

A 13-year-old boy was attacked with a metal pole by a 12-year-old at the park in August 2008 after two other teenagers talked the perpetrator into attacking the other boy. The Parks and Recreation Department began upgrades to the park in October 2009, paid for in part by a federal grant. Renovations included new playground equipment, a new bathroom, and landscape improvements. In 2010, the city announced the temporary fire station at the park would be closed after a new one was built at the nearby Hillsboro Airport.

== Amenities ==
Bicentennial Park is a 4.4-acre (1.8 ha) neighborhood park in the middle of Hillsboro. Features include a single soccer field, restrooms, a picnic shelter and picnic tables, paved walking paths, park benches, and a children's playground. The playground includes a climbing boulder similar to one at Orchard Park, on the other side of the city. The signature large, green water reservoir is 150 feet (46 m) in diameter and has a capacity of 6,000,000 US gallons (23,000,000 L; 5,000,000 imp gal). The park does not have off-street parking, but does include large oak trees along the southern end of property.
