= Jordan Murray (soccer) =

Australian soccer player

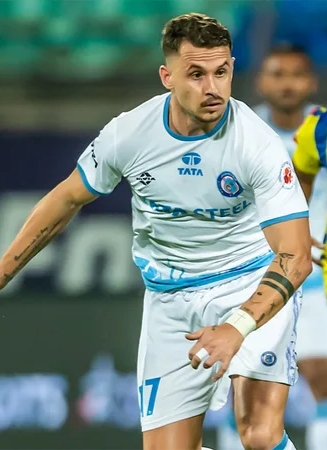
- Murray with Jamshedpur in 2025

Personal information
- Full name: Jordan David Murray
- Date of birth: 2 October 1995 (age 31)
- Place of birth: Wollongong, Australia
- Height: 1.82 m (6 ft 0 in)
- Position: Striker

Team information
- Current team: DPMM FC
- Number: 27

Youth career
- Bulli
- South Coast Wolves

Senior career*
Years	Team	Apps	(Gls)
2014–2015	South Coast Wolves	38	(15)
2016–2018	APIA Leichhardt	63	(43)
2018–2020	Central Coast Mariners	41	(7)
2020–2021	Kerala Blasters	19	(7)
2021–2022	Jamshedpur	17	(4)
2022–2023	Nakhon Ratchasima	28	(4)
2023–2024	Chennaiyin	20	(5)
2024–2025	Jamshedpur	23	(6)
2025–	DPMM	29	(11)
- * Club domestic league appearances and goals as of 20 November 2026

Jordan David Murray (born 2 October 1995) is an Australian professional soccer player who plays as a forward for DPMM FC of the Malaysia Super League.

== Career ==
=== South Coast Wolves ===
Murray started his career at South Coast Wolves, a semi-professional club that competes in the National Premier League (NPL). He made a total of 38 appearances there and scored 15 goals.

=== APIA Leichhardt ===
In 2016, he was signed by APIA Leichhardt which also competes in the NPL. Out of his 61 appearances for the club, he scored 43 goals and also won the golden boot during the 2018 NSW season.

=== Central Coast Mariners ===
In 2018, he signed his first professional contract with Central Coast Mariners. He made his debut for the Mariners as a second-half substitute in a 1–1 draw with the Brisbane Roar in Round 1 of the 2018–19 season. Murray scored his first A-League goal with a strike in a 4–1 loss to Perth Glory at Central Coast Stadium. On 17 April 2019, after 21 appearances in the A-League, Murray signed a new two-year deal with the Mariners. In October 2020, the club officially stated that they have parted ways with Murray on mutual terms. Later it was revealed that he has agreed in terms with an Indian Super League club.

=== Kerala Blasters ===
On 24 October 2020, Murray signed for the Indian Super League club Kerala Blasters ahead of the 2020–21 ISL season. He made his debut for the Blasters on 20 November against ATK Mohun Bagan, coming on as a substitute in the 75th minute. On 13 December 2020, Murray scored on his first start for the club in the South Indian Derby against Bengaluru. Murray scored his next his goal against Hyderabad on 27 December 2020 which ended 2-0 in favour of the Blasters. He also scored a goal in a 4-2 loss against Odisha on 7 January 2021. On 10 January, Murray's brace helped Blasters win against Jamshedpur 3-2 and was awarded the man of the match award. Murray scored in the 1-1 draw against East Bengal on 15 January 2021, thus scoring in three consecutive matches during the season. He was the top scorer for the club in the season. On 11 June 2021, the club officially announced the departure of Murray.

=== Jamshedpur ===
On 5 September 2021, Jamshedpur announced that they had signed a two-year deal with Murray, ahead of the 2021–22 Indian Super League.

=== Nakhon Ratchasima ===
On August 4, 2022, Murray moved to Thailand, signing with Nakhon Ratchasima.

=== Chennaiyan FC ===
For 2023-24 season, Murray signed for Indian Super League side Chennaiyin FC.

=== Jamshedpur return ===
For the 2024–25 ISL season, Murray returned to ISL side Jamshedpur FC. He scored a last-minute winner on his debut in a 2–1 victory against Goa on 17 September 2024.

=== DPMM FC ===
On 3 August 2025, DPMM FC announced the signing of Murray for the 2025–26 Malaysia Super League, occupying the club's Asian slot for the league. He made his DPMM debut against Kuching City in the Malaysia FA Cup on 16 August where he came on in the second half and scored the winning goal in a 3–2 victory. On 30 September against Melaka, he converted a penalty in the first half to bring DPMM their first victory of their league campaign.

On 3 December 2026, in the 3–1 victory over PDRM, Murray executed a flick volley from just outside the penalty area for the second DPMM goal of the night, reminiscent of Thierry Henry's strike against Manchester United in the year 2000.

== Career statistics ==
As of match played 20 November 2026

Appearances and goals by club, season and competition
Club	Season	League			National cup (Note: Includes Australia Cup, Thai FA Cup, Super Cup, Malaysia FA Cup)		Continental		Other		Total	
Club	Season	Division	Apps	Goals	Apps	Goals	Apps	Goals	Apps	Goals	Apps	Goals
South Coast Wolves	2014	NSW NPL1	15	7	1	0	—		4 (Note: Appearances in Waratah Cup)	2	20	9
South Coast Wolves	2015	NSW NPL1	23	8	—		—		—		23	8
South Coast Wolves	Total		38	15	1	0	—		4	2	43	17
APIA Leichhardt	2016	NSW NPL1	20	7	—		—		—		20	7
APIA Leichhardt	2017	NSW NPL1	24	13	2	1	—		4 (Note: Two appearances in NPL Final Series, two appearances in Waratah Cup)	0	30	14
APIA Leichhardt	2018	NSW NPL1	19	23	1	0	—		4	4	24	27
APIA Leichhardt	Total		63	43	3	1	—		8	4	74	48
Central Coast Mariners	2018–19	A-League	23	3	0	0	—		—		23	3
Central Coast Mariners	2019–20	A-League	18	4	4	0	—		—		22	4
Central Coast Mariners	Total		41	7	4	0	—		—		45	7
Kerala Blasters	2020–21	Indian Super League	19	7	—		—		—		19	7
Jamshedpur	2021–22	Indian Super League	14	4	—		—		—		14	4
Nakhon Ratchasima	2022–23	Thai League 1	28	4	2	2	—		—		30	6
Chennaiyin	2023–24	Indian Super League	21	5	3	1	—		4 (Note: Appearances in Durand Cup)	1	28	7
Jamshedpur	2024–25	Indian Super League	23	6	4	0	—		2	1	29	7
DPMM	2025–26	Malaysia Super League	22	9	2	1	—		3 (Note: Appearances in Malaysia Cup)	0	27	10
DPMM	2026–27	Malaysia Super League	7	2	6	6	—		0	0	13	8
DPMM	Total		29	11	8	7	—		3	0	40	18
Total			274	101	23	10	—		21	8	318	119

== Honours ==
APIA Leichhardt

- National Premier Leagues NSW; Premiership: 2017
- National Premier Leagues NSW; runner-up: 2017, 2018
- Waratah Cup: 2018
- Waratah Cup; runner-up: 2017

Jamshedpur

- Indian Super League; League Winners Shield: 2021–22

Individual

- National Premier Leagues NSW: 2018 Golden Boot
