= David D'Apuzzo =

Australian soccer player

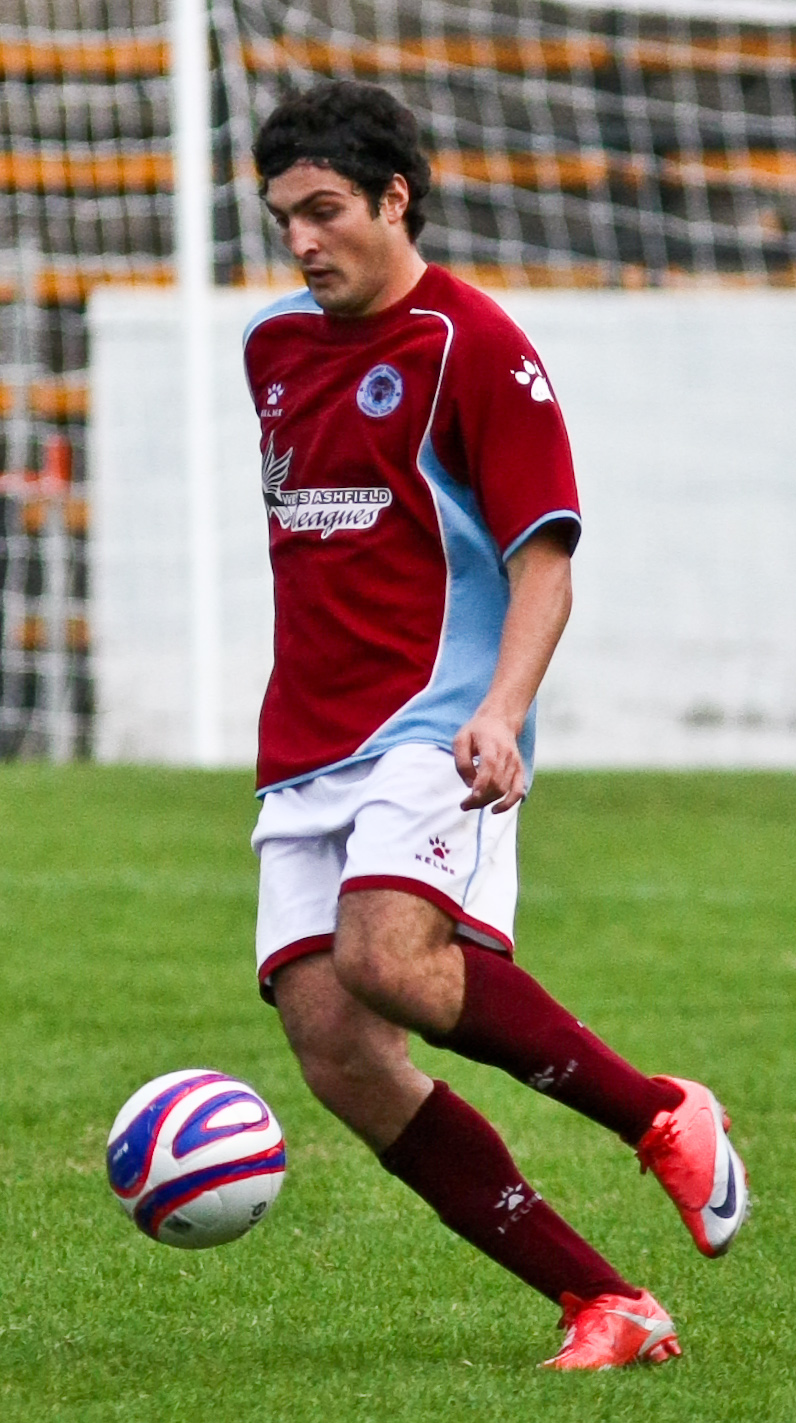

Personal information
- Full name: David D'Apuzzo
- Date of birth: 5 September 1988 (age 38)
- Place of birth: Sydney, Australia
- Height: 1.80 m (5 ft 11 in)
- Positions: Left back; left winger

Team information
- Current team: APIA Leichhardt
- Number: 13

Senior career*
Years	Team	Apps	(Gls)
2005–2006	Blacktown City		
2007	Sydney Olympic		
2008	APIA Leichhardt	14	(2)
2008–2010	Central Coast Mariners	10	(0)
2009–2010	→ APIA Leichhardt (loan)	6	(1)
2010–	APIA Leichhardt	123	(7)

International career
2005	Australia U17		
- * Club domestic league appearances and goals as of 9 November 2021

David D'Apuzzo (born 5 September 1988) is an Australian footballer.

== Career ==
Until December 2009, he was contracted as a left back for the A-League club Central Coast Mariners.

D'Apuzzo left his contract with the Central Coast Mariners to focus on studying for a law degree. He re-signed with APIA Leichhardt for the 2010 NSW Premier League season.

== Personal life ==
D'Apuzzo is also the brother of former Newcastle Jets midfielder Adam D'Apuzzo. He formerly attended Trinity Grammar School in Summer Hill, Sydney, Australia with both his brother and former Sydney FC striker Ben Vidaic.
