= Themba Muata-Marlow =

Australian soccer player

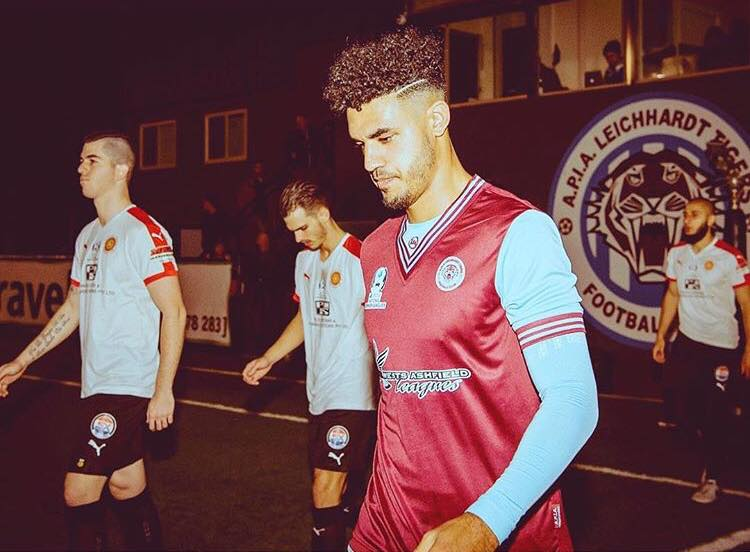
- Themba Muata-Marlow walks out for a game against the Rockdale city suns

Personal information
- Full name: Themba Muata-Marlow
- Date of birth: 30 April 1994 (age 32)
- Place of birth: Paddington, New South Wales, Australia
- Height: 1.86 m (6 ft 1 in)
- Position: Central defender

Team information
- Current team: APIA Leichhardt
- Number: 15

Youth career
- 2011–2012: Sutherland Sharks
- 2013: Rockdale City
- 2013–2015: Sydney FC

Senior career*
Years	Team	Apps	(Gls)
2013–2014	Rockdale City	13	(3)
2014–2015	Sydney FC	1	(0)
2015–2016	Newcastle Jets	0	(0)
2016–	APIA Leichhardt	178	(9)
- * Club domestic league appearances and goals as of 23 January 2025 ‡ National team caps and goals as of 22 February 2014

Themba Muata-Marlow (born 30 April 1994) is an Australian soccer player who currently plays as a central defender for APIA Leichhardt Tigers FC.
