= Rockdale Ilinden FC =

Australian soccer club

Rockdale Ilinden
- Full name: Rockdale Ilinden Football Club / Фудбалски Клуб Рокдејл Илинден
- Nickname: Ilinden
- Founded: 1969; 57 years ago
- Ground: Bicentennial Park South, Rockdale, Sydney
- Capacity: 6,000
- Chairman: Dennis Loether
- Coach: Paul Dee
- League: NPL NSW
- 2026: 9th of 16
- Website: rockdaleilindenfc.com.au
Home colours	Away colours

Rockdale Ilinden Football Club (commonly known as Rockdale City Suns Football Club from 1992 to 2020) is an Australian semi-professional soccer club based in the suburb of Rockdale, Sydney. Founded in 1969, by Macedonian Australians, the club competes in the highest men's competition in New South Wales, the National Premier Leagues NSW. The club's home ground is Ilinden Sports Centre, located in Rockdale, New South Wales.

== History ==
The Rockdale Ilinden Soccer Club was formed in 1969 by a group of Macedonian Australians who gave the team the name "Ilinden", in honour of an uprising against the Ottomans in 1903. The club's first President, Simon Zipevski, laid the foundations as did the late Vlade Temelkovski who was president in 1978.

On the field, the highlights were grand final wins (of different leagues) in 1984, 2002 and 2006. The 1984 NSW First Division grand final team was coached by Ilija Takac, winning 3–2 over Inter Monaro at Marconi Stadium.

18 years later followed another First Grade Grand Final victory. In 2002 the coaching team of Mile Todoroski and Bill Pilovski led the team to an amazing Premiership/Championship double with only 1 loss in 24 games. In the grand final, they would meet the Hajduk Wanderers (who Rockdale defeated 5 goals to 3 just two weeks earlier in the semi-final) in very rainy and windy conditions at the Rockdale Ilinden Sports Centre. The team was captained by Spase Najdoski who scored the only goal in the game which in turn was the winning goal in the grand final in front of a crowd of 3000 at Melita Stadium.

Four years later in 2006, Rockdale Ilinden would claim another grand final victory this time over Penrith Nepean United. Rockdale won 1–0 in front of a crowd of 2000 at Melita Stadium. Penrith Nepean United would gain promotion to the New South Wales Premier League as Rockdale's application would be denied by Football NSW due to the Rockdale Ilinden Sports Centre not meeting specific stadium criteria for the Premier League.

The Rockdale Ilinden Soccer Club has been led by a wide array of coaching identities over their history. Some of these coaches were great players in their playing days. Kaz Kulak, Archie Blue, Ilija Takac, Ati Abonyi, Ljubo Gojkovic, Geoff Hoggart, John Fleming (1980s), Ljubo Jancev, Bill Pilovski, Manfred Schaefer, Risto Gojkovski, Rale Rasic, Doug Utjesenovic, Bill Temelkovski, Bill Boskovski, Gerry Gomez (1990s), Mile Todoroski, Ivan Petkovic, Zlatko Nastevski and current coach Mike Grbevski.

The 2009 Super League season officially began on 15 March 2009 with Rockdale Ilinden drawing 1–1 with the Northern Tigers at the Rockdale Ilinden Sports Centre. The club finished the season in first place on the ladder, claiming the Premiership and advancing to the finals. They were, however, eliminated during the preliminary final by the eventual champions Spirit FC 2 goals to nil.

Mile Todorovski became the new coach for the 2009 season. Lee Sterrey, formerly the coach of Marconi Stallions, replaced him for the 2011 Premier League season.

On 12 October 2009, Football NSW announced that the Rockdale City Suns would be promoted to the Premier League competition for the 2010 season.

In 2008, the club announced that they would be moving 1 km south from the Rockdale Ilinden Sports Centre in Arncliffe to Bicentennial Park South in Rockdale. On 12 December 2009, the club officially opened its new facilities at Bicentennial Park South (Ilinden Sports Centre). On 7 October 2015, the Rockdale City Council announced they would install a synthetic surface at Ilinden Sports Centre, with a likely completion date scheduled for the start of the 2017 season.

In 2015, Rockdale City Suns qualified for the Round of 32 of the FFA Cup for the first time - beating Rydalmere Lions, Arncliffe Aurora, Sydney University and Sutherland Sharks, and drawing Perth Soccer Club in the National Round of 32, played at the Ilinden Sports Centre on 5 August 2015. Rockdale came out on top that night in front of over 1,800 supporters, winning 3–1 with goals to Toufic Alameddine, Dylan Macallister and Marko Jesic. Rockdale then drew the A-League club Melbourne Victory in the Round of 16.

The match was moved to Jubilee Oval due to insufficient lighting at Ilinden Sports Centre. On 1 September 2015, an official crowd of 4,165 packed the Western and Southern stands of Jubilee Oval in a match that was broadcast live on Foxtel, with Melbourne Victory eventually coming out on top 3–2 in a tight match.

In 2018, Rockdale City Suns qualified for the Round of 32 again - beating Glebe Wanderers, Bankstown United, Sydney United 58 and Blacktown City. On 1 August 2018, they faced the A-League club Sydney FC (the then FFA Cup holders and Minor Premiers from the previous A-League season) in the Round of 32. Rockdale utilised enhanced lighting to be able to play at Ilinden Sports Centre. The match was broadcast live on Foxtel and a crowd of 4,489 packed into the Ilinden Sports Centre. Although Rockdale scored the first goal, Sydney FC won 4–2 in the end.

On 28 April 2024, Alec Urosevski scored his 134th goal for Rockdale, becoming the all-time goalscorer of the club, after a hat-trick in a 3–1 win against Wollongong Wolves.

On 31 July 2024, Rockdale Ilinden faced the A-League club Newcastle Jets (Champions from the 2007-08 A-League season) in the Round of 32 of the Australia Cup. The match was broadcast live on Network 10 and a crowd of 1,797 into the Ilinden Sports Centre. The Jets silenced the Ilinden home crowd early on, firing in the opener in 11 minutes scored the first goal, then Rockdale battled back to equalise half an hour in. Alec Urosevski mazed down the right wing and had the vision to pick out Bai Antoniou to his left in the box, who converted from close in. Newcastle Jets won 2–1 in the end.

== Players ==
=== Current squad ===
As of 1 July 2026,

Note: Flags indicate national team as defined under FIFA eligibility rules; some limited exceptions apply. Players may hold more than one non-FIFA nationality.

No.	Pos.	Nation	Player
1	GK	AUS	Levi Kaye
2	DF	AUS	Hunter Elliot
3	DF	AUS	Lachlan Griffiths
4	DF	JPN	Reo Kunimoto
5	DF	AUS	Giorgio Speranza
6	MF	AUS	Isaac Danzo
7	FW	AUS	Ollie Wiggin
8	MF	AUS	Jerry Skotadis
9	FW	SYR	Moudi Najjar
10	MF	AUS	Brendan Cholakian
11	MF	AUS	Lochlan Constable
14	MF	AUS	Dean Pelekanos

No.	Pos.	Nation	Player
15	DF	AUS	Stefan Simonovski
16	DF	AUS	Michael Marcevski
18	FW	AUS	Lucas De Sousa
19	MF	AUS	Dean Jovceski
21	GK	AUS	Ronan Mulgrew
23	FW	AUS	Harry McCarthy
26	MF	AUS	Harry Van Der Saag
27	FW	AUS	Lukas Ribarevski
41	FW	AUS	Maddox Barthou
66	MF	AUS	Mathieu Cordier
99	DF	AUS	Matthew Keremelevski
—	FW	AUS	James Temelkovski

=== U20's Current Squad ===
As of June 2025

Note: Flags indicate national team as defined under FIFA eligibility rules; some limited exceptions apply. Players may hold more than one non-FIFA nationality.

No.	Pos.	Nation	Player
21	FW	MKD	Jonathan Veljanovski
22	GK	AUS	Inbar Hefer
30	MF	MKD	Jake Nacovski (C)
31	FW	AUS	Boua Tiaree
32	DF	AUS	Angelo Kalamvokis
33	DF	MKD	Ethan Kotevski
34	MF	MKD	Jake Laskovski
35	FW	AUS	Lucas De Sousa
37	MF	AUS	Jordi Fulete

No.	Pos.	Nation	Player
40	MF	AUS	Adam Khalil
43	FW	AUS	Asher Zuanic
44	GK	AUS	Dimitrios Young
45	MF	AUS	Christian Ilovski
47	DF	AUS	Cruz Cookson
49	MF	MKD	Thomas Petrovski
—	MF	AUS	Paul Kalamvokis
—	DF	AUS	Evangelos Kalamvokis

== Honours ==
=== Domestic League ===
(Australia) NPL NSW

- Champions (1): 1984 (Division One)

(Australia) NPL NSW

- Premiers (2): 2020, 2024
- Runners Up (1): 2023

(Australia) NPL NSW

- Semi-Finalists (2): 2016, 2017

=== NSW NPL Finals Series ===
(Australia) NPL NSW

- Runners Up (4): 2013, 2020, 2024, 2025

(Australia) NPL NSW

- Semi-Finalists (4): 2014, 2016, 2017, 2018

=== NSW League One ===
(Australia) NSW League One

- Champions (2): 2002, 2006 (NSW Super League)

(Australia) NSW League One

- Premiers (3): 1983 (Division Two), 2002, 2009 (NSW Super League)

=== Domestic Cup ===
(Australia) (North Macedonia) Maso Cup

- Champions (8): 2011, 2013, 2015, 2016, 2017, 2019, 2020, 2025
