= 1963 NSW First Division season =

NSW First Division
- Season: 1963
- Champions: South Coast United
- Premiers: Prague
- Matches: 138
- Goals: 591 (4.28 per match)
- Best Player: Jim Kelly
- Top goalscorer: Brian Tristram (32)
- Biggest home win: APIA 8–1 Yugal; South Coast 7–0 Auburn; Auburn 9–2 Yugal
- Biggest away win: Croatia 0–8 South Coast
- Highest scoring: Auburn 9–2 Yugal

The 1963 NSW First Division season was the seventh season of soccer in New South Wales under the administration of the NSW Federation of Soccer Clubs since its breakaway from the NSW Soccer Football Association in January 1957. The home and away regular season began March and ended in August after 22 rounds. Prague once again finished first on the ladder to become regular season premiers for a fourth time in five years.

The finals series began in September with a four-team playoff series. Third placed team South Coast United defeated second placed APIA Leichhardt 4–0 to become grand final champions for a first time.

Once again, the pre-season Ampol Cup was held with SSC Yugal picking up their first trophy.

== Clubs ==
Changes from last season:

- Polonia–North Side were relegated to Second Division.
- Croatia were promoted from Second Division.

Club	Ground	Colours	Year formed	App
A.P.I.A.	Lambert Park, Leichhardt	Maroon shirts, white shorts	1954	7th
Auburn	Mona Park, Auburn	Green and gold shirts, white shorts	1957	7th
Bankstown	Bankstown Oval, Bankstown	Gold and green trim shirts, white shorts	1944	7th
Budapest–St George	Hurstville Oval, Hurstville	Red shirts, white shorts	1957	5th
Canterbury-Marrickville	Arlington Oval, Dulwich Hill	Blue and gold trim shirts, white shorts	1896 (Note: reformed in 1943 and 1951)	7th
Croatia	Arlington Oval, Dulwich Hill		1958	1st
Gladesville-Ryde	Gladesville Sports Ground, Gladesville	Yellow shirts with black "V" and black shorts	1919	7th
Hakoah	Wentworth Park, Glebe	Blue shirts, white shorts	1939	7th
Pan Hellenic	Wentworth Park, Glebe	Blue and white striped shirts, white shorts	1957	3rd
Prague	Sydney Athletics Field, Moore Park	White shirts, blue shorts	1950	7th
South Coast United	Woonona Oval, Woonona	Blue with red and white trim shirts, white with red and blue trim shorts	1958 (Note: Amalgamated with IDSA club Woonona-Bulli. Continues Corrimal United history)	5th
Yugal	Sydney Athletics Field, Moore Park	Blue shirts, white shorts	1961	2nd

== Table and results ==
Pos	Team	Pld	W	D	L	GF	GA	GD	Pts	Qualification or relegation
1	Prague	22	17	2	3	75	30	+45	36	Qualification for Finals series
2	A.P.I.A.	22	14	3	5	70	38	+32	31	Qualification for Finals series
3	South Coast United (C)	22	13	4	5	55	31	+24	30	Qualification for Finals series
4	Pan Hellenic	22	12	6	4	56	37	+19	30	Qualification for Finals series
5	Gladesville-Ryde	22	11	4	7	44	37	+7	26	
6	St. George-Budapest	22	8	5	9	41	39	+2	21	
7	Canterbury-Marrickville	22	7	6	9	37	45	−8	20	
8	Yugal-Ryde	22	9	1	12	45	64	−19	19	
9	Hakoah	22	3	8	11	41	59	−18	14	
10	Bankstown	22	7	0	15	36	60	−24	14	
11	Croatia	22	4	4	14	35	60	−25	12	
12	Auburn (R)	22	5	1	16	33	68	−35	11	Relegated to Second Division

(C) Champions; (R) Relegated

=== Results ===
Home \ Away	API	AUB	BAN	BUD	CAN	CRO	GLR	HAK	PAN	PRA	SCU	YUG
APIA		3–2	4–1	2–2	3–2	7–3	3–0	5–4	1–1	3–6	3–1	8–1
Auburn	0–5		1–5	1–4	1–2	1–0	0–5	4–5	1–3	0–3	2–1	9–2
Bankstown	1–4	0–2		1–0	0–0	2–4	2–4	5–2	0–5	1–5	1–3	0–1
Budapest-St George	3–5	1–2	4–1		1–1	3–0	1–0	1–2	1–4	1–4	2–1	3–1
Canterbury-Marrickville	1–1	5–2	1–5	1–3		2–1	2–3	1–1	2–1	2–5	0–4	2–1
Croatia Maroubra	0–4	2–2	1–4	2–3	1–1		2–3	3–0	4–5	1–0	0–8	4–3
Gladesville-Ryde	2–0	5–0	1–3	0–0	3–0	2–1		3–3	2–2	1–2	1–0	1–2
Hakoah	0–2	4–1	1–2	1–1	3–3	3–3	2–2		1–1	1–5	1–1	4–5
Pan Hellenic	3–2	4–1	4–1	2–0	2–3	1–1	1–3	2–1		2–4	1–1	3–2
Prague	3–2	4–1	4–0	3–1	4–1	2–1	5–0	6–1	1–1		3–4	2–0
South Coast United	1–0	7–0	3–2	3–1	2–1	1–0	3–2	1–0	3–2	3–3		3–3
Yugal-Ryde	1–3	2–0	2–3	1–6	1–0	3–1	3–5	2–1	3–4	3–1	3–1	

Source: www.socceraust.co.uk
Legend: Blue = home team win; Yellow = draw; Red = away team win.

== Finals series ==
Semi-finals; 1–15 September
Major Semifinal
1	Prague	(2)(2)1
2	A.P.I.A.	(2)(2)2
Minor Semifinal
3	South Coast	7
4	Pan Hellenic	1

Preliminary final 18 September
1	Prague	2
3	South Coast	3

Grand final 22 September
2	A.P.I.A.	0
3	South Coast	4

=== Semi-finals ===
1 September 1963 Minor semi-final	South Coast United	7–1	Pan Hellenic	Moore Park, Sydney
	Barnett; Johnson; B. Harris; Doherty		C. Perkins	Stadium: Sydney Sports Ground; Attendance: 13,465; Referee: Tony Boskovic

8 September 1963 Major semi-final	Prague	2–2	APIA Leichhardt	Moore Park, Sydney
	Tristram		Wong	Stadium: Sydney Sports Ground; Attendance: 18,503; Referee: Roy Pearce

11 September 1963 (replay)	Prague	2–2 (a.e.t.)	APIA Leichhardt	Moore Park, Sydney
	Gauto; Tran-Bich-The		Baumgartner; Giacometti	Stadium: Sydney Sports Ground; Attendance: 11,800; Referee: Roy Pearce

15 September 1963 (replay)	Prague	2–1	APIA Leichhardt	Moore Park, Sydney
	Les Scheinflug		Wong; Giacometti	Stadium: Sydney Sports Ground; Attendance: 18,921; Referee: Roy Pearce

=== Preliminary final ===
18 September 1963 Preliminary final	Prague	2–3	South Coast United	Moore Park, Sydney
	Hrncir; Tristram		Barnett; Johnson; Doherty	Stadium: Sydney Sports Ground; Attendance: 11,387; Referee: Tony Boskovic

=== Grand Final ===
22 September 1962

APIA Leichhardt	0–4	South Coast United
		Johnson; Brownlie; McKellar (o.g.)

Sydney Sports Ground, Moore Park, Sydney
Attendance: 30,158
Referee: Tony Boskovic

GK	1	(Spain) Adauto Iglesias
RB	2	(Australia) Jim Sambrook
LB	3	(Australia) Robert Murua
RH	4	(Austria) Karl Jaros
CH	5	(Australia) Joe Marston
LH	6	(Australia) Pat Hughes
OR	7	(Australia) B. Ihaksi
IR	8	(Australia) R. McKellar
CF	9	(Austria) Leo Baumgartner
IL	10	(Australia) Johnny Wong
OL	11	(Australia) John Giacometti
Coach:
(Austria) Leo Baumgartner

GK	1	(England) Wilf Billington
RB	2	(Australia) Barry Salisbury
LB	3	(Northern Ireland) Adrian Ringland
RH	4	(England) Jim Kelly
CH	5	(Scotland) Jim Harris
LH	6	(Australia) Max Tolson
OR	7	(Australia) Bernie Harris
IR	8	(England) Mike Johnson
CF	9	(Australia) John Brownlie
IL	10	(England) Graham Barnett
OL	11	(Australia) Dennis Patterson
Coach:
(England) Jim Kelly

NSWSF First Division
1963 Premiers

South Coast United
First Title

== Statistics and awards ==
=== Stars of 1963 ===
Soccer World reporters awarded stars out of six to players throughout the 22 rounds. The player with the highest stars was Jim Kelly with 4.38. Only 12 players average four points or more. South Coast United had four players, Prague had three players, Pan Hellenic two players, Budapest, Canterbury and APIA all had one player that averaged four points or more. Below left is the list of all twelve players and below right is the team of the year:

Player	Team	Rating
Jim Kelly	South Coast United	4.38
Ron Lord	Sydney FC Prague	4.32
Nilo Rusalen	Pan Hellenic	4.26
Petar Banicevic	Budapest	4.21
Ron Corry	Canterbury-Marrickville	4.18
John Doherty	South Coast United	4.18
G. Jones	Prague	4.18
Brian Smith	Pan Hellenic	4.14
Luis Gauto	Prague	4.10
Jim Harris	South Coast United	4.05
Joe Marston	APIA Leichhardt	4.05
Pat Woods	South Coast United	4.00

1963 Team of the Year

=== Top scorers ===
Brian Tristram was the recipient of the Marcel Nagy Trophy for the season's top goalscorer. Below is a list of the top ten goalscorers for the season:

Player	Team	Goals
Brian Tristram	Prague	32
Leo Baumgartner	APIA	20
John Giacometti	APIA	20
Herbert Ninaus	Hakoah	20
Graham Barnett	South Coast United	18
Tiko Jelisavčić	Yugal-Ryde	16
John Doherty	South Coast United	13
Sotiris Patrinos	Pan Hellenic	13
Les Schauman	Croatia Maroubra	13
Les Scheinflug	Prague	13

=== Attendances ===
Below is a list of attendances by club:

Rank	Club	Attendance
1	APIA	164,000
2	Pan Hellenic	161,000
3	Prague	105,000
4	SSC Yugal	88,000
5	Budapest–St George	83,000
6	South Coast United	79,000
7	Hakoah	73,000
8	Croatia Maroubra	61,000
9	Canterbury-Marrickville	49,000
10	Gladesville-Ryde	43,500
11	Auburn	39,500
12	Bankstown	34,500

== Other competitions ==
=== Ampol Cup ===
The season began with the seventh edition of the floodlight pre-season night series (sixth as the Ampol Cup) on 8 February 1963, culminating with the double-header third place playoff and Final on Friday, 15 March 1962 at the Redfern Oval in front of 7,000 spectators.

==== Finals series ====
Quarter-finals
Yugal-Ryde	6
Hakoah	2
A.P.I.A.	4
Gladesville	1
Auburn	2
Canterbury-Marrickville	1
Prague	3
Budapest	2

Semi-finals
Yugal-Ryde	3
A.P.I.A.	1
Auburn	2(2)
Prague	2(1)

Finals
Yugal-Ryde	5
Auburn	3
Third place playoff
A.P.I.A.	4
Prague	2

- NB: Replay scores in brackets.

==== Final ====
15 March 1963

Yugal-Ryde	5–3	Auburn
Pacanin; Medina; Jelisavcic; Alagich	Report	Jeffrey; Tran; Baker

Redfern Oval, Redfern, Sydney
Attendance: 7,000
Referee: Frank Sbisa

== See also ==
- 1963 in Australian soccer
- 1963 NSWSF season
- 1963 NSW Federation Cup
