= 1962 NSWSF season =

NSW Federation of Soccer Clubs
- Season: 1962
- Champions: Hakoah
- Premiers: Budapest
- Best Player: Angelo Mavro
- Top goalscorer: Vernon Wentzel (28)

The 1962 NSW Federation of Soccer Clubs (NSWSF) season was the sixth season of football in New South Wales under the administration of the federation since its breakaway from the NSW Soccer Football Association in January 1957. The season included three cup tournaments, including a new pre-season Wollongong Festival of Sport held in February, as well as the usual floodlight Ampol Cup pre-season night series tournament and the post-season Federation Cup (now called the Craven A Cup for sponsorship reasons). The home and away league season began in April with twelve teams, culminating with the grand final held in September. Winners of the tournaments for the season were South Coast United in the Wollongong Festival of Sport, Prague in the Ampol Cup, APIA Leichhardt FC in the Craven A Cup, and in the league Budapest were the premiers and Hakoah were the grand final winners.

Teams from the Federation also participated in the newly formed Australia Cup, in which clubs would participate against teams from other federations in the country. New South Wales club, SSC Yugal would win this inaugural competition.

Also in the post-season, players would get the chance to represent the federation in the Australian Interstate Championships, with this season being the first sponsored by the Australian Soccer Federation. New South Wales would win this tournament.

== Clubs ==
Changes from last season:

- Sydney Austral relegated.
- SSC Yugal promoted from Second Division

Club	Ground	Colours	Year formed	App
A.P.I.A.	Lambert Park, Leichhardt	Maroon shirts, white shorts	1954	6th
Auburn	Mona Park, Auburn	Green and gold shirts, white shorts	1957	6th
Bankstown	Bankstown Oval, Bankstown	Gold and green trim shirts, white shorts	1944	6th
Budapest	Sydney Athletics Field, Moore Park	Red shirts, white shorts	1957	4th
Canterbury-Marrickville	Arlington Oval, Dulwich Hill	Blue and gold trim shirts, white shorts	1896, reformed in 1943 and 1951	6th
Gladesville-Ryde	Gladesville Sports Ground, Gladesville		1919	6th
Hakoah	Wentworth Park, Glebe	Sky blue shirts, white shorts	1939	6th
Pan Hellenic	Wentworth Park, Glebe	Blue and white striped shirts, white shorts	1957	2nd
Polonia-North Side	Drummoyne Oval, Drummoyne	Gold shirts, white shorts	1960	2nd
Prague	Sydney Athletics Field, Moore Park	All-black outfit with red-white and blue sash	1950	6th
South Coast United	Woonona Oval, Woonona	Blue with red and white trim shirts, white with red and blue trim shorts	1960	2nd
Yugal	no fixed ground	Blue shirts, white shorts	1961	1st

== Table and results ==
Pos	Team	Pld	W	D	L	GF	GA	GD	Pts	Qualification or relegation
1	Budapest	22	13	4	5	61	45	+16	30	Qualification for Finals series
2	Hakoah	22	13	3	6	47	26	+21	29	Qualification for Finals series
3	A.P.I.A.	22	13	3	6	65	38	+27	29	Qualification for Finals series
4	Yugal	22	12	4	6	55	53	+2	28	Qualification for Finals series
5	Prague	22	10	6	6	55	46	+9	26	
6	Bankstown	22	11	2	9	45	36	+9	24	
7	Pan Hellenic	22	10	2	10	46	42	+4	22	
8	South Coast United	22	10	2	10	41	43	−2	22	
9	Auburn	22	7	2	13	40	55	−15	16	
10	Gladesville	22	5	4	13	23	48	−25	14	
11	Canterbury	22	4	5	13	44	55	−11	13	
12	Polonia–North Side	22	3	5	14	32	67	−35	11	Relegated to Second Division

=== Results ===
Home \ Away	API	AUB	BAN	BUD	CAN	GLR	HAK	HEL	PNS	PRA	SCU	YUG
APIA		5–0	2–4	2–5	5–1	2–1	3–0	5–0	4–1	1–4	5–0	5–1
Auburn	2–5		2–0	2–3	4–2	2–1	2–3	0–2	3–5	2–3	3–1	2–2
Bankstown	0–1	5–2		0–0	1–0	1–0	1–3	0–2	5–1	2–2	4–3	1–3
Budapest	2–1	0–1	2–3		6–2	5–3	2–1	1–3	5–3	3–3	3–1	3–4
Canterbury-Marrickville	2–2	5–2	1–5	1–1		0–1	0–2	0–3	3–3	2–2	1–1	1–2
Gladesville-Ryde	2–2	2–2	0–2	0–2	0–5		1–0	2–1	0–0	0–4	1–1	1–3
Hakoah	6–2	3–0	1–0	3–0	2–1	4–1		0–2	0–0	0–0	3–0	6–3
Pan Hellenic	2–2	1–2	0–2	2–3	3–7	1–2	2–0		6–2	3–0	2–0	0–3
Polonia-North Side	2–6	1–3	3–1	1–3	1–5	3–1	1–3	1–1		1–3	0–4	1–3
Prague	1–2	3–2	3–2	2–4	4–3	4–0	1–1	5–4	4–0		1–5	1–3
South Coast United	1–3	1–0	4–1	1–3	2–0	2–1	0–3	4–2	2–1	2–1		0–2
SSC Yugal	1–0	3–2	1–4	4–4	3–2	2–3	4–3	5–0	1–1	4–4	2–4	

Source: www.socceraust.co.uk
Legend: Blue = home team win; Yellow = draw; Red = away team win.

=== Finals series ===
Semi-finals; 8–9 September
1	Budapest	2
2	Hakoah	5
3	A.P.I.A.	2
4	SSC Yugal	3

Final (replay); 16 & 19 September
1	Budapest	1(3)
4	SSC Yugal	1(2)

Grand final 23 September
2	Hakoah	4
1	Budapest	2

==== Semi-finals ====
8 September 1962 Minor semi-final	SSC Yugal	3–2	APIA Leichhardt	Moore Park, Sydney
	H. Ringhoff; I. Milankovic; A. Nincevic		L. Baumgartner; P. Turella	Stadium: Sydney Sports Ground; Attendance: 12,000; Referee: R. Pearce

9 September 1962 Major semi-final	Hakoah	5–2	Budapest	Moore Park, Sydney
	Ninaus ?', ?', ?'; Jaros ?'; Levi ?'		Galambos ?'; Massey ?'	Stadium: Sydney Sports Ground; Attendance: 12,300; Referee: Frank Sbisa

==== Preliminary final ====
16 September 1962	Budapest	1–1	SSC Yugal	Moore Park, Sydney
	E. Massey 68' (pen.)	Report	S. Pacanin 44'	Stadium: Sydney Sports Ground; Attendance: 15,752; Referee: Frank Sbisa

19 September 1962 Replay	Budapest	3–2	SSC Yugal	Moore Park, Sydney
	J. Pompor 24' (pen.), 85'; J. Vasvary 58'	Report	S. Pacanin 42'; A. Nincevic 79'	Stadium: Sydney Sports Ground; Attendance: 9,800; Referee: Roy Pearce

==== Grand Final ====
After last years final attendance 18,432 a new record crowd for Australian club football with 26,770 spectators.

23 September 1962
15:30 AEST

Hakoah	4–2	Budapest
Ninaus 4', 34', 52'; Blutsch 12'	Report	Hetherington 74'; Medina 78'

Sydney Sports Ground, Moore Park, Sydney
Attendance: 26,770
Referee: Roy Pearce

GK	1	(Austria) Heinz Wenzl
RB	2	(Austria) Victor Mach
LB	3	(New Zealand) Jock Aird
RH	4	(New Zealand) Ron Kearns
CH	5	(Austria) Adolf Handorf
LH	6	(Israel) Gerry Chaldi
OR	7	(Austria) Karl Jaros
IR	8	(Austria) Adolf Blutsch
CF	9	(Israel) Rafi Levi
IL	10	(Austria) Herbert Ninaus
FW	11	(Austria) Heinz Dolezal	(yellow card) 84'
Reserves:
	12	(Australia) Ray Neal
Manager:

GK	1	(Hungary) Ernő Grósz
RB	2	(Austria) Herbert Stegbauer
LB	3	(Hungary) Julius Gergely
RH	4	(Hungary) Charles Kangyar	(yellow card) 42'
CH	5	(Socialist Federal Republic of Yugoslavia) Peter Banicevic
LH	6	(Hungary) Tibor Zuckermann
OR	7	(Spain) Juan Medina
IR	8	(Argentina) Eduardo Massey
CF	9	(Hungary) Joco "Joe" Pompor
IL	10	(England) Alan Hetherington (c)
OL	11	(Hungary) Les Schauman
Reserves:
	12	(Australia) D. Buchanan
Manager:
(Hungary) Joe Vlasits

NSWSF First Division
1962 Champions

Hakoah
Second Title

=== Statistics ===
	Hakoah	Budapest
Attempts at goal	17	14
Attempts on target	9	5
Attempts off target	4	9
Attempts - Woodwork	2	0
Corners	6	13
Fouls committed	23	23
Offsides	5	2

== Statistics and awards ==
=== Stars of 1962 ===
Soccer World reporters awarded stars out of six to players throughout the 22 rounds. The player with the highest stars was Angelo Mavro with 4.440. Overall APIA Leichhardt, Budapest, Prague and SSC Yugal all had 2 players top-rated for their position. Auburn, Pan Hellenic, Canterbury-Marrickville, Hakoah and Bankstown all had one player top-rated for their position. Below is a list of the top rated players per position:

Position	Player (Team)	Rating
Goalkeeper	E. Grosz (Budapest)	4.227
Right fullback	V. Mach (Hakoah)	4.000
Left fullback	G. Nuttall (Canterbury-Marrickville)	3.909
Right half	A. Mavro (Pan Hellenic)	4.440
Centre half	J. Marston (APIA Leichhardt) F. Van Gaalen (Auburn)	4.363
Left half	F. Dunaj (SSC Yugal)	4.333
Outside right	N. Stiffle (Bankstown)	3.895
Inside right	E. Schwarz (SSC Yugal) V. Wentzel (APIA Leichhardt)	3.900
Centre forward	E. Massey (Budapest)	4.227
Inside left	L. Scheinflug (Prague)	3.954
Outside left	A. Jeffrey (Prague)	4.000

=== Top scorers ===
Vernon Wentzel was the recipient of the Marcel Nagy Trophy for the season's leading goalscorer. Below is a list of the top five goalscorers for the season:

Player	Team	Goals
Vernon Wentzel	APIA Leichhardt	28
Wim van der Gaag	Prague	21
Joe Galambos	Budapest	20
Tiko Jelisavcic	SSC Yugal	19
Leo Baumgartner	APIA Leichhardt	16
Tony Nincevich	SSC Yugal	16

=== Attendances ===
Below is a list of attendances by club:

Rank	Club	Attendance
1	APIA Leichhardt	126,000
2	Pan Hellenic	100,000
3	Hakoah	96,000
4	Prague	86,500
5	Budapest	78,500
6	South Coast United	64,500
7	SSC Yugal	63,000
8	Canterbury-Marrickville	56,500
9	Bankstown	50,500
10	Auburn	38,000
11	Gladesville-Ryde	32,500
12	Polonia-North Side	30,500

== Other competitions ==
=== Wollongong Festival of Sport ===
The season began with the Wollongong Soccer Carnival in February at the Wollongong Showground, attracting 15,000 fans over three days. South Coast United beat teams from Sydney and Melbourne to become inaugural champions of this event, winning the £1000 first place prize.

Round	Date	Winning team	Score	Losing team	Attendance
First Round	23 February 1962	Canterbury-Marrickville	2–0	Budapest (Sydney)	4,600
First Round	23 February 1962	South Coast United	2–0	Hakoah (Sydney)	4,600
Semi-finals	24 February 1962	South Coast United	2–0	Pan Hellenic (Sydney)	5,000
Semi-finals	24 February 1962	Canterbury-Marrickville	4–0	Polonia (Melbourne)	5,000
Third place playoff	25 February 1962	Pan Hellenic (Sydney)	9–3	Polonia (Melbourne)	5,200
Final	25 February 1962	South Coast United	6–0	Canterbury-Marrickville	5,200

=== Ampol Cup ===
The season began with the sixth edition of the floodlight pre-season night series (fifth as the Ampol Cup) on 14 February 1962, culminating with the double-header third place playoff and Final on 30 March 1962 at the Sydney Sports Ground in front of 12,600 spectators. The tournament was played across various grounds throughout Sydney, including Sydney Athletics Field, Redfern Oval, Wentworth Park and Sydney Sports Ground.

==== First Round ====
Date	Winning team	Score	Losing team	Location	Attendance
14 February 1962	Budapest	0–0	Bankstown	Sydney Athletics Field	2,400
14 February 1962	Canterbury-Marrickville	3–1	Polonia-North Side	Sydney Athletics Field	2,400
2 March 1962	SSC Yugal	2–1	Pan Hellenic	Sydney Athletics Field	4,000
2 March 1962	Gladesville-Ryde	2–1	South Coast United	Sydney Athletics Field	4,000
5 March 1962 (‡)	Budapest	3–2	Bankstown	Redfern Oval	1,300

* (‡) = Match replayed

==== Finals series ====
Quarter-finals
Canterbury	1
Hakoah	0
A.P.I.A.	2
Budapest	0
SSC Yugal	4
Auburn	3
Prague	2
Gladesville-Ryde	0

Semi-finals
Canterbury	5
A.P.I.A.	1
SSC Yugal	4(2)
Prague	4(4)

Finals
Canterbury	2
Prague	3
Third place playoff
A.P.I.A.	3
SSC Yugal	0

==== Semi-finals ====
23 March 1962 Semi-final	Prague	4–4	Yugal	Moore Park, Sydney
	Tamandl; Jeffrey; R. Hoare; Scheinflug		Jelisavcic; J. Ferguson; Stojanovic; B. Robinson	Stadium: Sydney Sports Ground; Attendance: 11,800; Referee: Roy Pearce

23 March 1962 Semi-final	Canterbury-Marrickville	5–1	APIA Leichhardt	Moore Park, Sydney
	J. Warren (2); Watkiss (2); G. Warren		Morrow	Stadium: Sydney Sports Ground; Attendance: 11,800; Referee: Frank Sbisa

25 March 1962 Semi-final (replay)	Prague	4–2	Yugal	Glebe, Sydney
	Scheinflug (2); Jeffrey; R. Hoare		Aranyi; Jelisavcic	Stadium: Wentworth Park; Attendance: 6,200; Referee: Frank Sbisa

==== Finals ====
30 March 2023 Third place playoff	APIA Leichhardt	3–0	Yugal	Moore Park, Sydney
	P. Hughes (2); Wentzel			Stadium: Sydney Sports Ground; Attendance: 12,600; Referee: Roy Pearce

30 March 2023 Grand final	Prague	3–2	Canterbury-Marrickville	Moore Park, Sydney
	Ninaus; Tamandl; Scheinflug		Brown; J. Warren	Stadium: Sydney Sports Ground; Attendance: 12,600; Referee: Frank Sbisa

=== Craven A Federation Cup ===
==== Finals ====
Quarterfinals
Budapest	3
Yugal	0
A.P.I.A.	4
Bankstown	1
Gladesville-Ryde	3
Prague	0
Canterbury-Marrickville	3
South Coast Utd	2

Semifinals
Budapest	1
A.P.I.A.	3
Gladesville-Ryde	2
Canterbury-Marrickville	4

Final
A.P.I.A.	5
Canterbury-Marrickville	1
Third place
Budapest	1
Gladesville-Ryde	5

4 November 1962
Final

APIA Leichhardt	5–1	Canterbury-Marrickville
Giacometti (2); Hunter; Morrow; Curry (o.g.)		Watkiss

Wentworth Park, Glebe
Attendance: 8,600
Referee: Frank Sbisa

== See also ==
- 1962 in Australian soccer
