= 1965 NSW First Division season =

NSW First Division
- Season: 1965
- Champions: APIA Leichhardt FC
- Premiers: South Coast United
- Matches: 90 (regular season) + 7 (finals)
- Best Player: Jimmy Kelly
- Top goalscorer: John Giacometti (23)
- Biggest home win: 4 goals (on three occasions)
- Biggest away win: Cumberland United 0–10 APIA Leichhardt
- Highest scoring: 10 goals (0–10 and 4–6)
- Highest attendance: 8,860; Pan Hellenic v. APIA (regular season)

The 1965 NSW First Division season was the ninth season of soccer in New South Wales under the administration of the NSW Federation of Soccer Clubs since its breakaway from the NSW Soccer Football Association in January 1957. In a truncated season compared to the previous year, the home and away regular season comprised 18 rounds, beginning in March and ending in August. South Coast United finished first on the ladder to become regular season premiers for the second time.

The finals series was primarily held throughout September with a four-team playoff series. APIA Leichhardt reached the grand final against St George-Budapest when they eventually defeated Yugal after three minor semi final replays and defeat of South Coast in the preliminary final. The club recorded their second consecutive championship with a 2–0 victory over St George, with Johnny Watkiss and Johnny Wong scoring in the decider.

The pre-season Ampol Cup was won for a fifth time by Sydney FC Prague, defending the title from the previous season.

== Clubs ==
Changes from last season:

- The division was contracted to a ten-team league, reducing its number from 12 teams.
- Canterbury, Bankstown SC and first time participants Corinthian BESC were relegated to NSW Second Division.
- Polonia-North Side were promoted from NSW Second Division.

Club	Ground	Year formed	App	Debut	Last season (Finals)
A.P.I.A.	Lambert Park; Sydney Sports Ground	1954	9th	1957	1st (W)
St George-Budapest	Hurstville Oval	1957	7th	1959	2nd (RU)
Croatia	Arlington Oval	1958	3rd	1963	7th
Cumberland United	Mona Park	1964 (Note: Auburn and Gladesville merged keeping separate histories)	2nd	1964	8th
Hakoah	Wentworth Park	1939	9th	1957	7th
Pan Hellenic	Wentworth Park	1957	5th	1961	6th
Polonia-North Side	Drummoyne Oval	1961 (Note: North Side-E.P.T merged with Polonia keeping separate histories)	3rd	1961	1st in Div. II
Prague	Sydney Athletics Field	1950	9th	1957	4th (SF)
South Coast United	Woonona Oval	1958 (Note: Amalgamated with IDSA club Woonona-Bulli in 1961. Continues Corrimal United history)	8th	1958	3rd (PF)
Yugal	Sydney Athletics Field	1961	4th	1962	8th

== Table and results ==
Pos	Team	Pld	W	D	L	GF	GA	GD	Pts	Qualification or relegation
1	South Coast United	18	12	2	4	45	23	+22	26	Qualification for Finals series
2	St. George-Budapest	18	11	4	3	44	25	+19	26	Qualification for Finals series
3	A.P.I.A. (C)	18	11	0	7	51	28	+23	22	Qualification for Finals series
4	Yugal-Ryde	18	9	4	5	30	23	+7	22	Qualification for Finals series
5	Prague	18	8	2	8	31	28	+3	18	
6	Hakoah	18	5	6	7	34	40	−6	16	
7	Metropolitan Adriatic	18	5	3	10	31	48	−17	13	
8	Cumberland United	18	6	1	11	27	53	−26	13	
9	Pan Hellenic	18	3	6	9	32	47	−15	12	
10	Polonia-North Side (R)	18	4	4	10	21	31	−10	12	Relegated to Second Division

(C) Champions; (R) Relegated

=== Results ===
Home \ Away	API	CUM	HAK	MET	PAN	PNS	PRA	SCU	SGB	YUG
APIA		4–0	2–1	4–0	1–2	5–2	1–2	3–4	2–4	1–2
Cumberland United	0–10		2–1	4–2	0–2	1–2	3–2	1–7	1–2	0–3
Hakoah	2–5	1–4		3–2	2–2	0–0	1–1	1–1	1–0	1–1
Metropolitan Adriatic	3–1	4–1	2–5		2–0	2–3	1–6	4–1	1–6	0–2
Pan Hellenic	5–3	2–3	4–6	3–3		1–1	1–4	1–7	3–4	1–1
Polonia-North Side	0–2	1–1	3–4	1–2	2–0		0–1	1–3	2–2	1–3
Prague	0–3	2–3	4–1	1–0	2–0	0–2		0–1	1–3	1–2
South Coast United	0–2	5–2	3–1	0–0	2–1	2–0	3–0		1–2	3–2
St George-Budapest	1–3	4–0	2–2	5–1	2–2	1–0	1–1	2–1		2–1
Yugal-Ryde	0–1	2–1	2–1	2–2	2–2	1–0	2–3	0–2	2–1	

Source: www.socceraust.co.uk
Legend: Blue = home team win; Yellow = draw; Red = away team win.

== Finals series ==
Semi-finals; 29 Aug.–5 Sep.
Major Semifinal
1	South Coast	1
2	St George-Budapest	3
Minor Semifinal (replay score)
3	A.P.I.A.	3
4	Yugal	0

Preliminary final 19 September
1	South Coast	0
3	A.P.I.A.	4

Grand final 26 September
2	St George-Budapest	0
3	A.P.I.A.	2

=== Semi-finals ===
29 August 1965 Minor semi-final	A.P.I.A.	1–1	Yugal	Moore Park, Sydney
	Watkiss 27'	Report	Mucillo 88'	Stadium: Sydney Sports Ground; Attendance: 10,400; Referee: N. Jones

5 September 1964 Major semi-final	South Coast United	1–3	St George-Budapest	Moore Park, Sydney
	Barnett 10'	Report	Rodriguez 56'; Todd 74'; J. Warren 83'	Stadium: Sydney Sports Ground; Attendance: 7,319; Referee: D. Buchan

8 September 1965 Minor semi-final replay 1	A.P.I.A.	1–1	Yugal	Moore Park, Sydney
	Wong 77'	Report	Vicevic 86'	Stadium: Sydney Sports Ground; Attendance: 11,374 (Note: Double-header with Pan Hellenic v. Polonia-NS relegation decider); Referee: N. Jones

12 September 1965 Minor semi-final replay 2	A.P.I.A.	3–3 (a.e.t.)	Yugal	Moore Park, Sydney
	Watkiss 36', 115'; Wong 87' (pen.)	Report	Lalic 7'; Dacevski 82'; Vicevic 111' (pen.)	Stadium: Sydney Sports Ground; Attendance: 8,850; Referee: H. Parsons

15 September 1965 Minor semi-final replay 3	A.P.I.A.	3–0	Yugal	Moore Park, Sydney
	Hughes 40'; McKinnon 58', 80'	Report		Stadium: Sydney Sports Ground; Attendance: 8,905; Referee: A.R. Brown

=== Preliminary final ===
19 September 1965	South Coast United	0–4	A.P.I.A.	Moore Park, Sydney
		Report	Watkiss 19'; Campana 52'; McKinnon 83', 88'	Stadium: Sydney Sports Ground; Attendance: 10,540; Referee: H. Parsons

=== Grand Final ===
26 September 1965

St George-Budapest	0–2	A.P.I.A.
	Report	Watkiss 54'; Wong 57'

Sydney Sports Ground, Moore Park, Sydney
Attendance: 9,857
Referee: Tony Boskovic

GK	1	(Scotland) Frank Haffey
RB	2	(Austria) Herbert Stegbauer
LB	3	(Australia) Roger Hillary
RH	4	(Australia) Manfred Schaefer
CH	5	(Socialist Federal Republic of Yugoslavia) Petar Banicevic
LH	6	(Australia) Frank Lang
OR	7	(Australia) Dave Todd
IR	8	(Australia) Johnny Warren
CF	9	(Australia) Hugo Rodriguez
IL	10	(Scotland) George Yardley
OL	11	(Argentina) Vic Fernandez
Coach:
(Hungary) Laurie Hegyes

GK	1	(Australia) John Roberts
RB	2	(Australia) Cliff van Blerk
LB	3	(England) Stan Ackerley
RH	4	(Scotland) Pat Hughes
CH	5	(Australia) Jimmy Sambrook
LH	6	(Australia) Phil Bottalico
OR	7	(Australia) Graeme McKinnon
IR	8	(Australia) Ricardo Campana
CF	9	(Australia) Johnny Watkiss
IL	10	(Australia) Johnny Wong
OL	11	(Australia) John Giacometti
Coach:
(Australia) Joe Marston

NSWSF First Division
1965 Premiers

A.P.I.A.
Second Title

== Statistics and awards ==
=== Top Star Award ===
Soccer World reporters awarded stars out of six to players throughout the 18 rounds. The player with the highest stars was Jimmy Kelly with 4.28, very narrowly beating Polonia-North Side halfback Ginter Gawlik. 15 players averaged four points or more. Below left is the list of all fifteen players and below right is the team of the year:

Player	Team	Rating
Jimmy Kelly	South Coast United	4.28
Ginter Gawlik	Polonia-North Side	4.22
Dave Todd	St. George-Budapest	4.17
Mita Stojanovic	Yugal	4.16
Jim Harris	South Coast United	4.12
Manfred Schaefer	St. George-Budapest	4.11
Petar Banicevic	St. George-Budapest	4.08
Jerzy Drewniak	Polonia-North Side	4.05
Ferdo Dunaj	Yugal	4.00
Phil Bottalico	APIA	4.00
Fred Falzon	Prague	4.00
Jim Fernie	Pan Hellenic	4.00
Pat Hughes	APIA	4.00
Grenville Jones	Prague	4.00
Heinz Ringhoff	Yugal	4.00

1965 Team of the Year

=== Top scorers ===
John Giacometti was the season's top goalscorer with 23 goals. Below is a list of the top ten goalscorers for the season:

Player	Team	Goals
John Giacometti	APIA	23
Graham Barnett	South Coast United	18
Joe Galambos	Metro Adriatic	18
Tony Nincevich	South Coast United	12
Herbert Ninaus	Hakoah	11
Max Tolson	South Coast United	11
Johnny Watkiss	APIA	10
Vic Fernandez	St. George-Budapest	9
Doug Logan	Pan Hellenic	9
George Yardley	St. George-Budapest	9

=== Attendances ===
Below is a list of attendances by club:

Rank	Club	Total attendance	Highest home attendance
1	APIA	94,000	8,574
2	Pan Hellenic	76,000	8,860
3	South Coast United	61,400	7,055
4	St. George-Budapest	56,200	5,945
5	Yugal	54,200	4,618
6	Prague	49,800	5,600
7	Hakoah	46,300	5,383
8	Polonia-North Side	38,200	3,500
9	Metro Adriatic	37,400	4,380
10	Cumberland United	31,000	3,850

== Other competitions ==
=== Ampol Cup ===
The season began with the ninth edition of the floodlit pre-season night series (eighth as the Ampol Cup), culminating with the double-header third place playoff and Final on Friday, 19 February in front of 5,800 spectators.

==== Finals series ====
Semi-finals
Yugal	3
Metro Adriatic	0
Prague	4
Hakoah	3

Finals
Yugal	2
Prague	6
Third place playoff
Metro Adriatic	2
Hakoah	1

==== Final ====
19 February 1965

Yugal	2–6	Prague
Palmer 32'; Ninchevic 75'	Report	Badaracco 25', 95'; Blitz 74'; Tristram 94', 100'; Scheinflug 103' (pen.)

Sydney Showground, Moore Park, Sydney
Attendance: 5,800
Referee: Harold Parsons

== See also ==
- 1965 in Australian soccer
- 1965 NSWSF season
- 1965 NSW Federation Cup
