= 1963 NSW Federation Cup =

Tournament details
- Country: Australia (NSW)
- Teams: 16

Final positions
- Champions: Sydney Hakoah
- Runners-up: South Coast United

Tournament statistics
- Matches played: 17
- Goals scored: 56 (3.29 per match)

The 1963 NSW Federation Cup was the seventh edition of the NSW Soccer Federation's premier soccer cup. Due to a lack of sponsorship, there was no prize money on offer for this tournament and the first time since the 1958 edition that it was solely known as the Federation Cup. The cup was contested by all twelve first division clubs and four second division clubs.

APIA Leichhardt were the defending champions, but were eliminated in the first round to Gladesville-Ryde.

The final was played between Sydney Hakoah and South Coast United, with Hakoah winning the match 2–1 and to claim their third Federation Cup title.

== Format and clubs ==
Round	Clubs remaining	Clubs advancing from previous round	New entries this round	Main match dates
First Round	16	N/A	12 clubs from NSW First Division; 4 clubs from NSW Second Division	from 24 August 1963
Quarter-finals	8	8 winners from First Round	none	from 2 October 1963
Semi-finals	4	4 winners from quarter-finals	none	from 11 October 1963
Final	2	2 winners from semi-finals enter Final	none	25 October 1963

== First Round ==
Tie no.	Date	Team 1 (div.)	Score	Team 2 (div.)
3	24 August 1963	Auburn (1)	0–1	Polonia-North Side (2)
4	24 August 1963	South Coast United (1)	5–1	Budapest-St. George (1)
5	25 August 1963	Hakoah (1)	5–0	Sydney Austral (2)
6	25 August 1963	Pan Hellenic (1)	0–2	Yugal Ryde (1)
7	25 August 1963	Bankstown United (1)	1–2	Balgownie Rangers (2)
8	25 August 1963	APIA Leichhardt (1)	2–3	Gladesville-Ryde (1)
1	24 September 1963	Croatia Maroubra (1)	3–1	Corinthian BESC (2)
2	24 September 1963	Prague (1)	1–4	Canterbury-Marrickville (1)

== Finals ==
Quarter-finals
Canterbury-Marrickville	2
Polonia-North Side	1
Yugal Ryde	0
Sydney Hakoah	2
Croatia Maroubra	1
Gladesville-Ryde	3
South Coast Utd	2
Balgownie Rangers	1

Semi-finals
Canterbury-Marrickville	1(1)
Sydney Hakoah	1(3)
Gladesville-Ryde	1(0)
South Coast Utd	1(1)

Final
Sydney Hakoah	5
South Coast Utd	1

- NB: Replay scores in brackets.

=== Quarter-finals ===
Tie no.	Date	Team 1 (div.)	Score	Team 2 (div.)
9	2 October 1963	Canterbury-Marrickville (1)	3–1	Polonia-North Side (2)
10	2 October 1963	Yugal Ryde (1)	0–2	Hakoah (1)
11	6 October 1963	Croatia Maroubra (1)	1–3	Gladesville-Ryde (1)
12	6 October 1963	South Coast United (1)	2–1	Balgownie Rangers (2)

=== Semi-finals ===
Tie no.	Date	Team 1 (div.)	Score	Team 2 (div.)
13	11 October 1963	Gladesville-Ryde (1)	1–1 (a.e.t.)	South Coast United (1)
replay	20 October 1963	Gladesville-Ryde (1)	0–1	South Coast United (1)
14	11 October 1963	Hakoah (1)	1–1 (a.e.t.)	Canterbury-Marrickville (1)
replay	20 October 1963	Hakoah (1)	3–1	Canterbury-Marrickville (1)

=== Third place final ===
Friday, 25 October 1963

Canterbury-Marrickville	5–2	Gladesville-Ryde
Watkiss 35'; Galambos 50', 57', 66'; Munster 79'	Report	McPhail 26'; Reynolds 69'

ES Marks Athletics Field, Moore Park
Attendance: 2,200
Referee: Frank Sbisa

=== Final ===
Friday, 25 October 1963

Hakoah	2–1	South Coast United
Gold 44'; Ninaus 62'	Report	Johnson 58'

ES Marks Athletics Field, Moore Park
Attendance: 2,200
Referee: Roy Pearce

1	(Australia) G. McGuire
2	(Australia) B. McGuire
3	(Australia) T. Maxwell
4	(Australia) R. Kearns
5	(Australia) M. Woods
6	(Australia) G. Chaldi
7	(Australia) R. Levi
8	(Austria) (Australia) A. Saghi
9	(Australia) M. Bell
10	(Austria) (Australia) H. Ninaus
11	(Australia) B. Gold
Coach:

1	(England) Wilf Billington
2	(Australia) Barry Salisbury
3	(Northern Ireland) Adrian Ringland
4	(England) Jimmy Kelly
5	(Australia) Phil Carr
6	(Australia) Max Tolson
7	(Australia) John Brownlie
8	(England) Mike Johnson
9	(England) John Doherty
10	(England) Graham Barnett
11	(Australia) Dennis Patterson
Coach:
(England) Jimmy Kelly

NSW Federation Cup
1963 Champions

Hakoah
Third Title
