= Ron Burns (soccer) =

Australian soccer player

Personal information
- Place of birth: Wollongong, New South Wales, Australia
- Positions: Outside forward; centre-forward

Senior career*
Years	Team	Apps	(Gls)
1954–1957	Corrimal Rangers		
1958–1963	Corrimal United / South Coast United	115	(71)

International career
1955	Australia	1	(0)
- * Club domestic league appearances and goals

Ron Burns is a former Australian soccer player.

Raised in Wollongong, Burns was most notable for being a part of the very successful Corrimal Rangers side of the mid-1950's which earned him selection for the Socceroos. This was the only occasion he earned a full international cap and thus he is on the list of single cap Socceroos. This match was played in 1955 against a touring South African team in Sydney, Burns earning cap number 143. Burns competed at the highest level of soccer in Australia with the Corrimal Rangers in the NSW Soccer Football Association State Championship and with South Coast United in the NSW Soccer Federation premiership.

Burns was a golden boot winner, ending the 1955 NSWSFA season with 37 goals from 28 matches.

== Club career ==
=== Early career ===
Burns captained the New South Wales Under-15 side in a tour of Victoria.

=== Corrimal Rangers ===
Burns was part of an extremely successful Corrimal Rangers side throughout the 1950's prior to the creation of NSW Federation of Soccer Clubs in 1957.

The 1954 season was an extremely successful one for Corrimal, winning the State Premiership, State Cup and Sydney Cup. Burns played in 17 of 30 matches across all competitions.

Burns and his Corrimal team won the league double in 1955, securing the State Premiership and the Grand Challenge Final with an 11–3 win over Cessnock. Corrimal also won a third trophy, the Sydney Cup, with a 3–1 win over Auburn. Burns played in 28 of 30 matches and was the top scorer across all competitions with 37 goals. Team mates Ted Drain and Keith Learmonth also featured in the top five scorers with 21 and 20 goals respectively.

In 1957, Corrimal Rangers were Southern Section State Premiers but lost the Minor Final to Wallsend FC and thus the Minor Premiership. In some controversy, Corrimal forfeited the Grand Challenge Final as they did not believe they should be forced to travel to Newcastle for the match. The side also bowed out early in the State Cup (Round 3) and the Sydney Cup (Round 2). On a personal note, Burns was the clubs leading scorer with 22 goals from 23 matches. His team mates, Ted Drain (19 goals), Phil Peters (18 goals), Keith Learmonth (17 goals) and Warren Kerr (14 goals) were also prolific scorers that season.

=== Corrimal United ===
In 1958, Burns was among the group of players and committeemen from Corrimal Rangers that decided to compete in the breakaway league run by the NSW Federation of Soccer Clubs, forming the new club Corrimal United. This season was highly successful for the fledging club, winning the minor premiership at its first attempt. Burns was the clubs second top scorer for the season with 19 goals, sitting only behind Learmonth on 30 goals. Corrimal ended the season with consecutive losses in the finals series to Canterbury-Marrickville and Auburn SFC respectively. Corrimal finished third in the pre-season cup playoff, however they failed to register a win in the Federation Cup.

1959 was a very productive season for Burns as he played in every match for Corrimal United. This included all 27 league games, 4 pre-season cup games and 1 Federation Cup match. He was the joint second top scorer in the league for the club with Tom Rowles on 13 goals. Both players trailed Learmonth on 19 goals. Corrimal ended the regular season in third but did not progress past the minor semifinal against Hakoah losing 2–4.

Once again Burns was an ever-present for United in the league, playing in all 26 matches. He was also the clubs top marksman with 18 goals. Disappointingly, the club finished 11th missing out on the finals series for the first time since joining the Federation. The club also lost their opening matches of the pre-season and Federation Cups that year.

=== South Coast United ===
Corrimal United merged with Woonona-Bulli Soccer Football Club in 1961 moving its home matches to Woonona. The playing squad was primarily that of the old Corrimal United and once again, Burns was the most capped player and the top scorer for the club in the league, playing in 21 out of 22 matches and scoring 17 goals. For the second season in a row the club missed out on the finals series after coming 10th in the regular season. Once again the club failed to win their opening round matches of the pre-season and Federation Cups.

Burns played 18 of 26 matches in the 1962 season for South Coast United, scoring on four occasions. The club finished 8th meaning Burns would miss out on playing finals football for a third straight year.

In 1963, Burns was mainly relegated to reserve grade only appearing in one league match and one Australia Cup match.

== Representative career ==
=== Australia ===
Burns played in his one and only national team match in 1955 against South Africa. He made his debut on the 24 September 1955 at Sydney Cricket Ground with three fellow Corrimal Rangers players, Bob Bignall, Ted Drain (who was making his second national team appearance after an almost eight year absence) and Phil Peters who was also on debut.

=== Other representative matches ===
Other than his national representation, Burns also played representative matches for his region. He represented South Coast against New Zealand in 1954 and against Metropolitan in 1955 and 1956. In 1958 he represented the Illawarra against the touring Hearts of Midlothian.

== Playing statistics ==
=== Club ===
Appearances and goals by club, season and competition
Club	Season	League			League cup (Note: Includes Sydney Cup (NSWSFA) and Ampol Cup (NSWSF))		State cup (Note: Includes Association State Cup (NSWSFA) and Federation Cup (NSWSF))		National cup (Note: Includes Australia Cup (1962–1968))		Total	
Club	Season	Division	Apps	Goals	Apps	Goals	Apps	Goals	Apps	Goals	Apps	Goals
Corrimal Rangers	1954	NSWSFA State Premiership	?	?	?	?	?	?	—		17	?
Corrimal Rangers	1955	NSWSFA State Premiership	?	?	?	?	?	?	—		28	37
Corrimal Rangers	1956	NSWSFA State Premiership	?	?	?	?	?	?	—		?	?
Corrimal Rangers	1957	NSWSFA State Premiership	?	?	?	?	?	?	—		23	22
Corrimal Rangers	Total		?	?	?	?	?	?	0	0	58+	59+
Corrimal United / South Coast United	1958	NSWSF First Division	23 (Note: 21 regular season matches#,2 finals matches)	19 (Note: 18 regular season goals, 1 finals goals)	4	0	1	? (Note: unknown goals, team total was 2.)	—		28	19
Corrimal United / South Coast United	1959	NSWSF First Division	27 (Note: 26 regular season matches, 1 finals match)	13 (Note: 13 regular season goals, unknown finals goals (team total was 2))	4	? (Note: unknown goals, team total was 12.)	1	? (Note: unknown goals, team total was 1.)	—		32	13
Corrimal United / South Coast United	1960	NSWSF First Division	26	18	? (Note: unknown appearances, team played 1 match)	? (Note: unknown goals, team total was 2)	? (Note: unknown appearances, team played 1 match)	0	—		26	18
Corrimal United / South Coast United	1961	NSWSF First Division	21	17	1	0	? (Note: unknown appearances, team played 1 match)	0	—		22	17
Corrimal United / South Coast United	1962	NSWSF First Division	17	4	1	0	0	0	0	0	18	4
Corrimal United / South Coast United	1963	NSWSF First Division	1	0	0	0	0	0	1	0	2	0
Corrimal United / South Coast United	Total		115	71	10	0	2	0	1	0	128	71
Career total			115+	71+	10+	0+	2+	0+	1	0	186+	130+

=== International ===
Appearances and goals by national team and year
National team	Year	Apps	Goals
Australia	1955	1	0

== Honours ==
=== Player ===
Corrimal Rangers

- NSWSFA State Premiership: 1954, 1955, 1957
- NSWSFA State Premiership Grand Challenge Final: 1955
- NSWSFA State Cup: 1954
- NSWSFA Sydney Cup: 1954, 1955

Corrimal United / South Coast United

- NSW First Division minor premiership: 1958
- NSW First Division grand final championship: 1963 NSW First Division season

Individual

- NSWSFA State Premiership golden boot: 1955

== See also ==
- List of Australia men's international soccer players
- List of Australia men's international soccer players with one cap
