= 1962 in Australian soccer =

Soccer in Australia
- Season: 1962

Men's soccer
- NSW Federation Premiers: Budapest
- NSW Federation Grand final winners: Hakoah
- Australian Interstate Championships: New South Wales
- Australia Cup: Yugal

The 1962 season was the first season of national competitive soccer in Australia and 79th overall. The Australian Soccer Association introduced their Australia Cup, a knockout tournament.

== Domestic leagues ==
=== New South Wales Federation of Soccer Clubs ===
Pos	Team	Pld	W	D	L	GF	GA	GD	Pts	Qualification or relegation
1	Budapest	22	13	4	5	61	45	+16	30	Qualification for Finals series
2	Hakoah	22	13	3	6	47	26	+21	29	Qualification for Finals series
3	A.P.I.A.	22	13	3	6	65	38	+27	29	Qualification for Finals series
4	Yugal	22	12	4	6	55	53	+2	28	Qualification for Finals series
5	Prague	22	10	6	6	55	46	+9	26	
6	Bankstown	22	11	2	9	45	36	+9	24	
7	Pan Hellenic	22	10	2	10	46	42	+4	22	
8	South Coast United	22	10	2	10	41	43	−2	22	
9	Auburn	22	7	2	13	40	55	−15	16	
10	Gladesville	22	5	4	13	23	48	−25	14	
11	Canterbury	22	4	5	13	44	55	−11	13	
12	Polonia–North Side	22	3	5	14	32	67	−35	11	Relegated to Second Division

==== Finals ====
Semi-finals; 8–9 September
1	Budapest	2
2	Hakoah	5
3	A.P.I.A.	2
4	SSC Yugal	3

Final (replay); 16 & 19 September
1	Budapest	1(3)
4	SSC Yugal	1(2)

Grand final 23 September
2	Hakoah	4
1	Budapest	2

8 September 1962 Minor semi-final	SSC Yugal	3–2	APIA Leichhardt	Moore Park, Sydney
	H. Ringhoff; I. Milankovic; A. Nincevic		L. Baumgartner; P. Turella	Stadium: Sydney Sports Ground; Attendance: 12,000; Referee: R. Pearce

9 September 1962 Major semi-final	Hakoah	5–2	Budapest	Moore Park, Sydney
	H. Ninaus ?', ?', ?'; K. Jaros ?'; R. Levi ?'		J. Galambos ?'; E. Massey ?'	Stadium: Sydney Sports Ground; Attendance: 12,300; Referee: F. Sibsa

16 September 1962 Final	Budapest	1–1	SSC Yugal	Moore Park, Sydney
	E. Massey ?'		S. Pacanin ?'	Stadium: Sydney Sports Ground; Attendance: 15,800; Referee: F. Sibsa

19 September 1962 Final (replay)	Budapest	3–2	SSC Yugal	Moore Park, Sydney
	J. Pompor ?', ?'; J. Vasvary ?'		S. Pacanin ?'; A. Nincevic ?'	Stadium: Sydney Sports Ground; Attendance: 10,000; Referee: R. Pearce

23 September 1962 Grand Final	Hakoah	4–2	Budapest	Moore Park, Sydney
	H. Ninaus ?', ?', ?'; A. Blutsch ?'		A. Hetherington ?'; J. Medina ?'	Stadium: Sydney Sports Ground; Attendance: 26,770; Referee: R. Pearce

== Interstate Championships ==
New South Wales won the first Australian Interstate Championship sponsored by the Australian Federation. The total attendance for all Australian Interstate Championship matches was 64,000.

=== Preliminary Rounds ===
Pos	Team	Pld	W	D	L	GF	GA	GD	Pts	Qualification or relegation
1	New South Wales	3	2	1	0	6	3	+3	5	Qualification for Final
2	Queensland	3	2	0	1	10	6	+4	4	Qualification for Final
3	South Australia	3	1	1	1	6	8	−2	3	
4	Victoria	3	0	0	3	4	9	−5	0	

=== Final ===
New South Wales won the two-legged final 7–4 on aggregate.

25 July 1962 Final	Queensland	1–3	New South Wales	Brisbane, Queensland
	B. Tristam ?'		L. Baumgartner ?'; H. Ninaus ?'; K. Jaros ?'	Stadium: Brisbane Exhibition Oval; Attendance: 5,000; Referee: C. Bartolo (Victoria)

18 August 1962 Final	New South Wales	4–3 (7–4 agg.)	Queensland	Sydney, New South Wales
	R. Levi ?'; K. Jaros ?'; L. Baumgartner ?'; J. Watkiss ?'		G. McMillan ?'; B. Tristam ?'; M. Wild ?'	Stadium: Sydney Sports Ground; Attendance: 8,000; Referee: D. Gardner (South Australia)

== Cup competitions ==
=== Australia Cup ===
The competition began on 2 November 1962. Sixteen clubs had entered the competition with the final two clubs Yugal and St George-Budapest qualifying for the Final. Yugal won the final 8–1 with four goals from Tiko Jelisavčić, two goals from Eric Schwarts and one goal each for Tony Nincevich and Slavko Pacanin.

==== Final ====
9 December 1962

Yugal	8–1	St George Budapest
Jelisavcic ?', ?', ?', ?'; Schwartz ?', ?'; Nincevich ?'; Pacanin ?'		Buchanan ?'

Wentworth Park, Sydney
Attendance: 11,014
Referee: G. Hosie
