= List of Australia men's national soccer team World Cup and Asian Cup squads =

The World Cup and Asian Cup, are the primary competitive tournaments the Australia men's national soccer team enters. The finals of both tournaments held every four years in alternate even numbered years. Excluding the tournament years in which Australia either did not enter or failed to qualify for the finals, the Australia national team has nominated the following squads of players to compete in the finals:

== 1974 World Cup ==
Head coach: (Socialist Federal Republic of Yugoslavia) Rale Rasic

No.	Pos.	Player	Date of birth (age)	Caps	Club
1	GK	Jack Reilly	27 August 1945 (aged 28)	12	(Australia) Melbourne Hakoah
2	DF	Doug Utjesenovic	8 October 1946 (aged 27)	20	(Australia) St George-Budapest
3	DF	Peter Wilson (c)	15 September 1947 (aged 26)	31	(Australia) Safeway United
4	DF	Manfred Schaefer	12 February 1943 (aged 31)	46	(Australia) St George-Budapest
5	DF	Colin Curran	21 August 1947 (aged 26)	12	(Australia) Western Suburbs
6	MF	Ray Richards	18 May 1946 (aged 28)	28	(Australia) Marconi Fairfield
7	MF	Jimmy Rooney	10 December 1945 (aged 28)	20	(Australia) APIA Leichhardt
8	MF	Jimmy Mackay	19 December 1943 (aged 30)	28	(Australia) Sydney Hakoah
9	MF	Johnny Warren	17 May 1943 (aged 31)	41	(Australia) St George-Budapest
10	FW	Garry Manuel	20 February 1950 (aged 24)	4	(Australia) Pan-Hellenic
11	FW	Attila Abonyi	16 August 1946 (aged 27)	39	(Australia) St George-Budapest
12	FW	Adrian Alston	6 February 1949 (aged 25)	33	(Australia) Safeway United
13	MF	Peter Ollerton	20 May 1951 (aged 23)	4	(Australia) APIA Leichhardt
14	MF	Max Tolson	18 July 1945 (aged 28)	16	(Australia) Safeway United
15	DF	Harry Williams	7 May 1951 (aged 23)	2	(Australia) St George-Budapest
16	DF	Ivo Rudic	24 January 1942 (aged 32)	0	(Australia) Pan-Hellenic
17	DF	Dave Harding	14 August 1946 (aged 27)	1	(Australia) Pan-Hellenic
18	MF	Johnny Watkiss	28 March 1941 (aged 33)	23	(Australia) Sydney Hakoah
19	MF	Ernie Campbell	20 October 1949 (aged 24)	8	(Australia) Marconi Fairfield
20	FW	Branko Buljevic	6 September 1947 (aged 26)	19	(Australia) Footscray JUST
21	GK	Jim Milisavljevic	15 April 1951 (aged 23)	0	(Australia) Footscray JUST
22	GK	Allan Maher	21 July 1950 (aged 23)	0	(Australia) Sutherland Shire

== 2006 World Cup ==
Head coach: (Netherlands) Guus Hiddink

No.	Pos.	Player	Date of birth (age)	Caps	Club
1	GK	Mark Schwarzer	6 October 1972 (aged 33)	37	(England) Middlesbrough
2	DF	Lucas Neill	9 March 1978 (aged 28)	25	(England) Blackburn Rovers
3	DF	Craig Moore	12 December 1975 (aged 30)	33	(England) Newcastle United
4	MF	Tim Cahill	6 December 1979 (aged 26)	16	(England) Everton
5	MF	Jason Culina	5 August 1980 (aged 25)	13	(Netherlands) PSV Eindhoven
6	DF	Tony Popovic	4 July 1973 (aged 32)	56	(England) Crystal Palace
7	DF	Brett Emerton	22 February 1979 (aged 27)	48	(England) Blackburn Rovers
8	MF	Josip Skoko	10 December 1975 (aged 30)	46	(England) Wigan Athletic
9	FW	Mark Viduka (c)	9 October 1975 (aged 30)	33	(England) Middlesbrough
10	FW	Harry Kewell	22 September 1978 (aged 27)	20	(England) Liverpool
11	DF	Stan Lazaridis	16 August 1972 (aged 33)	59	(England) Birmingham City
12	GK	Ante Covic	13 June 1975 (aged 30)	1	(Sweden) Hammarby
13	MF	Vince Grella	5 October 1979 (aged 26)	17	(Italy) Parma
14	MF	Scott Chipperfield	30 December 1975 (aged 30)	46	(Switzerland) Basel
15	FW	John Aloisi	5 February 1976 (aged 30)	41	(Spain) Alavés
16	DF	Michael Beauchamp	8 March 1981 (aged 25)	2	(Australia) Central Coast Mariners
17	FW	Archie Thompson	23 October 1978 (aged 27)	20	(Australia) Melbourne Victory
18	GK	Zeljko Kalac	16 December 1972 (aged 33)	52	(Italy) Milan
19	FW	Joshua Kennedy	20 August 1982 (aged 23)	1	(Germany) Dynamo Dresden
20	DF	Luke Wilkshire	2 October 1981 (aged 24)	8	(England) Bristol City
21	MF	Mile Sterjovski	27 May 1979 (aged 27)	22	(Switzerland) Basel
22	DF	Mark Milligan	4 August 1985 (aged 20)	1	(Australia) Sydney FC
23	MF	Mark Bresciano	11 February 1980 (aged 26)	24	(Italy) Parma

== 2007 Asian Cup ==
Head coach: Graham Arnold

No.	Pos.	Player	Date of birth (age)	Caps	Club
1	GK	Mark Schwarzer	6 October 1972 (aged 34)	46	(England) Middlesbrough
2	DF	Lucas Neill	9 March 1978 (aged 29)	34	(England) West Ham United
3	DF	Patrick Kisnorbo	24 March 1981 (aged 26)	12	(England) Leicester City
4	FW	Tim Cahill	6 December 1979 (aged 27)	23	(England) Everton
5	MF	Jason Čulina	5 August 1980 (aged 26)	22	(Netherlands) PSV Eindhoven
6	DF	Michael Beauchamp	8 March 1981 (aged 26)	7	(Germany) 1. FC Nürnberg
7	DF	Brett Emerton	22 February 1979 (aged 28)	57	(England) Blackburn Rovers
8	DF	Luke Wilkshire	2 October 1981 (aged 25)	16	(Netherlands) Twente
9	FW	Mark Viduka (c)	9 October 1975 (aged 31)	39	(England) Newcastle United
10	MF	Harry Kewell	22 September 1978 (aged 28)	24	(England) Liverpool
11	FW	Archie Thompson	23 October 1978 (aged 28)	26	(Australia) Melbourne Victory
12	GK	Brad Jones	3 July 1982 (aged 25)	1	(England) Middlesbrough
13	MF	Vince Grella	5 October 1979 (aged 27)	27	(Italy) Torino
14	MF	Brett Holman	27 March 1984 (aged 23)	7	(Netherlands) Nijmegen
15	FW	John Aloisi	5 February 1976 (aged 31)	50	(Spain) Alavés
16	DF	Michael Thwaite	2 May 1983 (aged 24)	6	(Poland) Wisła Kraków
17	MF	Carl Valeri	14 August 1984 (aged 22)	2	(Italy) Grosseto
18	GK	Michael Petkovic	16 July 1976 (aged 30)	5	(Turkey) Sivasspor
19	MF	Nick Carle	23 November 1981 (aged 25)	4	(Turkey) Gençlerbirliği
20	DF	David Carney	30 November 1983 (aged 23)	2	(Australia) Sydney
21	MF	Mile Sterjovski	27 May 1979 (aged 28)	32	(Switzerland) Basel
22	DF	Mark Milligan	4 August 1985 (aged 21)	3	(Australia) Sydney
23	MF	Mark Bresciano	11 February 1980 (aged 27)	33	(Italy) Palermo

== 2010 World Cup ==
Head coach: (Netherlands) Pim Verbeek

No.	Pos.	Player	Date of birth (age)	Caps	Club
1	GK	Mark Schwarzer	6 October 1972 (aged 37)	75	(England) Fulham
2	DF	Lucas Neill (c)	9 March 1978 (aged 32)	56	(Turkey) Galatasaray
3	DF	Craig Moore	12 December 1975 (aged 34)	50	Unattached
4	MF	Tim Cahill	6 December 1979 (aged 30)	40	(England) Everton
5	MF	Jason Culina	5 August 1980 (aged 29)	49	(Australia) Gold Coast United
6	DF	Michael Beauchamp	8 March 1981 (aged 29)	21	(United Arab Emirates) Al-Jazira
7	MF	Brett Emerton	22 February 1979 (aged 31)	72	(England) Blackburn Rovers
8	DF	Luke Wilkshire	1 October 1981 (aged 28)	42	(Russia) Dynamo Moscow
9	FW	Joshua Kennedy	20 August 1982 (aged 27)	19	(Japan) Nagoya Grampus
10	FW	Harry Kewell	22 September 1978 (aged 31)	45	(Turkey) Galatasaray
11	DF	Scott Chipperfield	30 December 1975 (aged 34)	65	(Switzerland) Basel
12	GK	Adam Federici	31 January 1985 (aged 25)	1	(England) Reading
13	MF	Vince Grella	5 October 1979 (aged 30)	45	(England) Blackburn Rovers
14	FW	Brett Holman	27 March 1984 (aged 26)	31	(Netherlands) AZ
15	MF	Mile Jedinak	3 August 1984 (aged 25)	11	(Turkey) Antalyaspor
16	MF	Carl Valeri	14 August 1984 (aged 25)	22	(Italy) Sassuolo
17	FW	Nikita Rukavytsya	22 June 1987 (aged 22)	3	(Belgium) Roeselare
18	GK	Eugene Galekovic	12 June 1981 (aged 28)	4	(Australia) Adelaide United
19	MF	Richard Garcia	4 September 1981 (aged 28)	7	(England) Hull City
20	DF	Mark Milligan	4 September 1985 (aged 24)	10	(Japan) JEF United
21	DF	David Carney	30 November 1983 (aged 26)	25	(Netherlands) Twente
22	MF	Dario Vidošić	12 April 1987 (aged 23)	7	(Germany) MSV Duisburg
23	MF	Mark Bresciano	11 February 1980 (aged 30)	55	(Italy) Palermo

== 2011 Asian Cup ==
Head coach: (Germany) Holger Osieck

No.	Pos.	Player	Date of birth (age)	Caps	Club
1	GK	Mark Schwarzer	6 October 1972 (aged 38)	82	(England) Fulham
2	DF	Lucas Neill (c)	9 March 1978 (aged 32)	63	(Turkey) Galatasaray
3	DF	David Carney	30 November 1983 (aged 27)	32	(England) Blackpool
4	FW	Tim Cahill	6 December 1979 (aged 31)	46	(England) Everton
5	MF	Jason Čulina	5 August 1980 (aged 30)	56	(Australia) Gold Coast United
6	DF	Saša Ognenovski	3 April 1979 (aged 31)	1	(South Korea) Seongnam Ilhwa Chunma
7	DF	Brett Emerton	22 February 1979 (aged 31)	78	(England) Blackburn Rovers
8	DF	Luke Wilkshire	2 October 1981 (aged 29)	50	(Russia) Dynamo Moscow
9	FW	Scott McDonald	21 August 1983 (aged 27)	20	(England) Middlesbrough
10	MF	Harry Kewell	22 September 1978 (aged 32)	47	(Turkey) Galatasaray
11	FW	Nathan Burns	23 July 1988 (aged 22)	5	(Greece) AEK Athens
12	GK	Nathan Coe	1 June 1984 (aged 26)	0	(Denmark) SønderjyskE
13	DF	Jade North	7 January 1982 (aged 29)	31	(New Zealand) Wellington Phoenix
14	MF	Brett Holman	27 March 1984 (aged 26)	38	(Netherlands) AZ
15	MF	Mile Jedinak	3 August 1984 (aged 26)	16	(Turkey) Gençlerbirliği
16	MF	Carl Valeri	14 August 1984 (aged 26)	29	(Italy) Sassuolo
17	MF	Matt McKay	11 January 1983 (aged 27)	6	(Australia) Brisbane Roar
18	GK	Brad Jones	19 March 1982 (aged 28)	2	(England) Liverpool
19	MF	Tommy Oar	10 December 1991 (aged 19)	3	(Netherlands) Utrecht
20	DF	Matthew Špiranović	27 June 1988 (aged 22)	5	(Japan) Urawa Red Diamonds
21	DF	Jonathan McKain	21 September 1982 (aged 28)	14	(Saudi Arabia) Al-Nassr
22	MF	Neil Kilkenny	19 December 1985 (aged 25)	2	(England) Leeds United
23	FW	Robbie Kruse	5 October 1988 (aged 22)	0	(Australia) Melbourne Victory

== 2014 World Cup ==
Head coach: Ange Postecoglou

The final squad was announced on 3 June 2014.

No.	Pos.	Player	Date of birth (age)	Caps	Club
1	GK	Mathew Ryan	8 April 1992 (aged 22)	7	(Belgium) Club Brugge
2	DF	Ivan Franjic	10 September 1987 (aged 26)	9	(Australia) Brisbane Roar
3	DF	Jason Davidson	29 June 1991 (aged 22)	7	(Netherlands) Heracles Almelo
4	FW	Tim Cahill	6 December 1979 (aged 34)	69	(United States) New York Red Bulls
5	MF	Mark Milligan	4 August 1985 (aged 28)	29	(Australia) Melbourne Victory
6	DF	Matthew Spiranovic	27 June 1988 (aged 25)	18	(Australia) Western Sydney Wanderers
7	FW	Mathew Leckie	4 February 1991 (aged 23)	8	(Germany) FSV Frankfurt
8	DF	Bailey Wright	28 July 1992 (aged 21)	0	(England) Preston North End
9	FW	Adam Taggart	2 June 1993 (aged 21)	5	(Australia) Newcastle Jets
10	MF	Ben Halloran	14 June 1992 (aged 21)	2	(Germany) Fortuna Düsseldorf
11	MF	Tommy Oar	10 December 1991 (aged 22)	15	(Netherlands) Utrecht
12	GK	Mitchell Langerak	22 August 1988 (aged 25)	3	(Germany) Borussia Dortmund
13	MF	Oliver Bozanic	8 January 1989 (aged 25)	3	(Switzerland) Luzern
14	MF	James Troisi	3 July 1988 (aged 25)	11	(Australia) Melbourne Victory
15	MF	Mile Jedinak (c)	3 August 1984 (aged 29)	44	(England) Crystal Palace
16	MF	James Holland	15 May 1989 (aged 25)	14	Austria Wien
17	MF	Matt McKay	11 January 1983 (aged 31)	47	(Australia) Brisbane Roar
18	GK	Eugene Galekovic	12 June 1981 (aged 33)	8	(Australia) Adelaide United
19	DF	Ryan McGowan	15 August 1989 (aged 24)	9	(China) Shandong Luneng Taishan
20	MF	Dario Vidošić	8 April 1987 (aged 27)	23	(Switzerland) Sion
21	MF	Massimo Luongo	25 September 1992 (aged 21)	1	(England) Swindon Town
22	DF	Alex Wilkinson	13 August 1984 (aged 29)	3	(South Korea) Jeonbuk Hyundai Motors
23	MF	Mark Bresciano	11 February 1980 (aged 34)	74	(Qatar) Al-Gharafa

== 2015 Asian Cup ==
Head coach: Ange Postecoglou

On 7 December 2014, Postecoglou named a provisional list of 46 players for the tournament. The final squad was announced on 23 December 2014.

No.	Pos.	Player	Date of birth (age)	Caps	Goals	Club
1	GK	Mathew Ryan	8 April 1992 (aged 22)	13	0	(Royal Belgian Football Association) Club Brugge
2	DF	Ivan Franjic	10 September 1987 (aged 27)	12	0	(Russian Football Union) Torpedo Moscow
3	DF	Jason Davidson	29 June 1991 (aged 23)	13	0	(The Football Association) West Bromwich Albion
4	FW	Tim Cahill	6 December 1979 (aged 35)	77	36	(United States Soccer Federation) New York Red Bulls
5	DF	Mark Milligan	4 August 1985 (aged 29)	33	2	(Football Australia) Melbourne Victory
6	DF	Matthew Spiranovic	27 June 1988 (aged 26)	21	0	(Football Australia) Western Sydney Wanderers
7	FW	Mathew Leckie	4 February 1991 (aged 23)	16	1	(German Football Association) Ingolstadt 04
8	DF	Chris Herd	4 April 1989 (aged 25)	3	0	(The Football Association) Aston Villa
9	FW	Tomi Juric	22 July 1991 (aged 23)	5	1	(Football Australia) Western Sydney Wanderers
10	FW	Robbie Kruse	5 October 1988 (aged 26)	32	3	(German Football Association) Bayer Leverkusen
11	MF	Tommy Oar	10 December 1991 (aged 23)	21	1	(Royal Dutch Football Association) FC Utrecht
12	GK	Mitchell Langerak	22 August 1988 (aged 26)	5	0	(German Football Association) Borussia Dortmund
13	DF	Aziz Behich	16 December 1990 (aged 24)	7	2	(Turkish Football Federation) Bursaspor
14	MF	James Troisi	3 July 1988 (aged 26)	16	1	(Royal Belgian Football Association) Zulte Waregem
15	MF	Mile Jedinak (c)	3 August 1984 (aged 30)	52	6	(The Football Association) Crystal Palace
16	FW	Nathan Burns	7 May 1988 (aged 26)	7	0	(New Zealand Football) Wellington Phoenix
17	MF	Matt McKay	11 January 1983 (aged 32)	50	1	(Football Australia) Brisbane Roar
18	GK	Eugene Galekovic	12 June 1981 (aged 33)	8	0	(Football Australia) Adelaide United
19	MF	Terry Antonis	26 November 1993 (aged 21)	3	0	(Football Australia) Sydney FC
20	DF	Trent Sainsbury	5 January 1992 (aged 23)	4	0	(Royal Dutch Football Association) PEC Zwolle
21	MF	Massimo Luongo	25 September 1992 (aged 22)	5	0	(The Football Association) Swindon Town
22	DF	Alex Wilkinson	13 August 1984 (aged 30)	11	0	(Korea Football Association) Jeonbuk Hyundai Motors
23	MF	Mark Bresciano	11 February 1980 (aged 34)	81	13	(Qatar Football Association) Al-Gharafa

== 2018 World Cup ==
Head coach: (Netherlands) Bert van Marwijk

Australia's 32-man preliminary squad was announced on 6 May 2018. The squad was reduced to 26 players on 14 May, then extended to 27 players on 28 May. The final squad was announced on 3 June.

No.	Pos.	Player	Date of birth (age)	Caps	Goals	Club
1	GK	Mathew Ryan	8 April 1992 (aged 26)	44	0	(The Football Association) Brighton & Hove Albion
2	DF	Miloš Degenek	28 April 1994 (aged 24)	18	0	(Japan Football Association) Yokohama F. Marinos
3	DF	James Meredith	5 April 1988 (aged 30)	2	0	(The Football Association) Millwall
4	FW	Tim Cahill	6 December 1979 (aged 38)	106	50	(The Football Association) Millwall
5	DF	Mark Milligan	4 August 1985 (aged 32)	71	6	(Saudi Arabian Football Federation) Al-Ahli
6	DF	Matthew Jurman	8 December 1989 (aged 28)	4	0	(Korea Football Association) Suwon Samsung Bluewings
7	FW	Mathew Leckie	4 February 1991 (aged 27)	53	8	(German Football Association) Hertha BSC
8	MF	Massimo Luongo	25 September 1992 (aged 25)	36	5	(The Football Association) Queens Park Rangers
9	FW	Tomi Juric	22 July 1991 (aged 26)	35	8	(Swiss Football Association) Luzern
10	FW	Robbie Kruse	5 October 1988 (aged 29)	64	5	(German Football Association) VfL Bochum
11	FW	Andrew Nabbout	17 December 1992 (aged 25)	4	1	(Japan Football Association) Urawa Red Diamonds
12	GK	Brad Jones	19 March 1982 (aged 36)	6	0	(Royal Dutch Football Association) Feyenoord
13	MF	Aaron Mooy	15 September 1990 (aged 27)	34	5	(The Football Association) Huddersfield Town
14	FW	Jamie Maclaren	29 July 1993 (aged 24)	6	0	(Scottish Football Association) Hibernian
15	MF	Mile Jedinak (captain)	3 August 1984 (aged 33)	76	18	(The Football Association) Aston Villa
16	DF	Aziz Behich	16 December 1990 (aged 27)	23	2	(Turkish Football Federation) Bursaspor
17	FW	Daniel Arzani	4 January 1999 (aged 19)	2	1	(Football Australia) Melbourne City
18	GK	Danny Vukovic	27 March 1985 (aged 33)	1	0	(Royal Belgian Football Association) Genk
19	DF	Josh Risdon	27 July 1992 (aged 25)	8	0	(Football Australia) Western Sydney Wanderers
20	DF	Trent Sainsbury	5 January 1992 (aged 26)	35	3	(Swiss Football Association) Grasshoppers
21	FW	Dimitri Petratos	10 November 1992 (aged 25)	2	0	(Football Australia) Newcastle Jets
22	MF	Jackson Irvine	7 March 1993 (aged 25)	19	2	(The Football Association) Hull City
23	MF	Tom Rogic	16 December 1992 (aged 25)	37	7	(Scottish Football Association) Celtic

== 2019 Asian Cup ==
Head coach: Graham Arnold

The final squad was announced on 20 December 2018. On 24 December 2018, James Jeggo was called up instead of the injured Aaron Mooy. On 2 January 2019, Martin Boyle was replaced by Apostolos Giannou due to injury.

No.	Pos.	Player	Date of birth (age)	Caps	Goals	Club
1	GK	Mathew Ryan	8 April 1992 (aged 26)	50	0	(The Football Association) Brighton & Hove Albion
2	DF	Milos Degenek	28 April 1994 (aged 24)	20	1	(Football Association of Serbia) Red Star Belgrade
3	DF	Alex Gersbach	8 May 1997 (aged 21)	6	0	(Norwegian Football Federation) Rosenborg BK
4	DF	Rhyan Grant	26 February 1991 (aged 27)	2	0	(Football Australia) Sydney FC
5	DF	Mark Milligan (captain)	4 August 1985 (aged 33)	74	6	(Scottish Football Association) Hibernian
6	DF	Matthew Jurman	8 December 1989 (aged 29)	6	0	(Saudi Arabian Football Federation) Al-Ittihad
7	FW	Mathew Leckie	4 February 1991 (aged 27)	59	9	(German Football Association) Hertha BSC
8	MF	Massimo Luongo	25 July 1992 (aged 26)	38	6	(The Football Association) Queens Park Rangers
9	FW	Jamie Maclaren	29 July 1993 (aged 25)	8	0	(Scottish Football Association) Hibernian
10	FW	Robbie Kruse	5 October 1988 (aged 30)	70	5	(German Football Association) VfL Bochum
11	FW	Andrew Nabbout	17 December 1992 (aged 26)	8	2	(Japan Football Association) Urawa Red Diamonds
12	GK	Mitchell Langerak	22 August 1988 (aged 30)	8	0	(Japan Football Association) Nagoya Grampus
13	MF	James Jeggo	12 February 1992 (aged 26)	1	0	(Austrian Football Association) Austria Wien
14	FW	Apostolos Giannou	25 January 1990 (aged 28)	6	1	(Cyprus Football Association) AEK Larnaca
15	FW	Chris Ikonomidis	4 May 1995 (aged 23)	7	1	(Football Australia) Perth Glory
16	DF	Aziz Behich	16 December 1990 (aged 28)	30	2	(Royal Dutch Football Association) PSV Eindhoven
17	MF	Mustafa Amini	20 April 1993 (aged 25)	5	0	(Danish Football Association) AGF Aarhus
18	GK	Danny Vukovic	27 March 1985 (aged 33)	3	0	(Royal Belgian Football Association) Genk
19	DF	Josh Risdon	27 July 1992 (aged 26)	13	0	(Football Australia) Western Sydney Wanderers
20	DF	Trent Sainsbury	5 January 1992 (aged 27)	42	3	(Royal Dutch Football Association) PSV Eindhoven
21	FW	Awer Mabil	15 September 1995 (aged 23)	4	2	(Danish Football Association) Midtjylland
22	MF	Jackson Irvine	7 March 1993 (aged 25)	25	3	(The Football Association) Hull City
23	MF	Tom Rogic	16 December 1992 (aged 26)	42	8	(Scottish Football Association) Celtic

== 2022 World Cup ==
Coach: Graham Arnold

Australia announced their final squad on 8 November 2022. Martin Boyle withdrew injured and was replaced by Marco Tilio on 20 November.

No.	Pos.	Player	Date of birth (age)	Caps	Goals	Club
1	GK	Mathew Ryan (captain)	8 April 1992 (aged 30)	75	0	(Danish Football Association) Copenhagen
2	DF	Miloš Degenek	28 April 1994 (aged 28)	38	1	(United States Soccer Federation) Columbus Crew
3	DF	Nathaniel Atkinson	13 June 1999 (aged 23)	5	0	(Scottish Football Association) Heart of Midlothian
4	DF	Kye Rowles	24 June 1998 (aged 24)	3	0	(Scottish Football Association) Heart of Midlothian
5	DF	Fran Karačić	12 May 1996 (aged 26)	11	1	(Italian Football Federation) Brescia
6	FW	Marco Tilio	23 August 2001 (aged 21)	5	0	(Football Australia) Melbourne City
7	FW	Mathew Leckie	4 February 1991 (aged 31)	73	13	(Football Australia) Melbourne City
8	DF	Bailey Wright	28 July 1992 (aged 30)	27	2	(The Football Association) Sunderland
9	FW	Jamie Maclaren	29 July 1993 (aged 29)	26	8	(Football Australia) Melbourne City
10	MF	Ajdin Hrustic	5 July 1996 (aged 26)	20	3	(Italian Football Federation) Hellas Verona
11	FW	Awer Mabil	15 September 1995 (aged 27)	29	8	(Royal Spanish Football Federation) Cádiz
12	GK	Andrew Redmayne	13 January 1989 (aged 33)	4	0	(Football Australia) Sydney FC
13	MF	Aaron Mooy	15 September 1990 (aged 32)	53	7	(Scottish Football Association) Celtic
14	MF	Riley McGree	2 November 1998 (aged 24)	11	1	(The Football Association) Middlesbrough
15	FW	Mitchell Duke	18 January 1991 (aged 31)	21	8	(Japan Football Association) Fagiano Okayama
16	DF	Aziz Behich	16 December 1990 (aged 31)	53	2	(Scottish Football Association) Dundee United
17	MF	Cameron Devlin	7 June 1998 (aged 24)	1	0	(Scottish Football Association) Heart of Midlothian
18	GK	Danny Vukovic	27 March 1985 (aged 37)	4	0	(Football Australia) Central Coast Mariners
19	DF	Harry Souttar	22 October 1998 (aged 24)	10	6	(The Football Association) Stoke City
20	DF	Thomas Deng	20 March 1997 (aged 25)	2	0	(Japan Football Association) Albirex Niigata
21	FW	Garang Kuol	15 September 2004 (aged 18)	1	0	(Football Australia) Central Coast Mariners
22	MF	Jackson Irvine	7 March 1993 (aged 29)	49	7	(German Football Association) FC St. Pauli
23	FW	Craig Goodwin	16 December 1991 (aged 30)	10	1	(Football Australia) Adelaide United
24	DF	Joel King	30 October 2000 (aged 22)	4	0	(Danish Football Association) OB
25	FW	Jason Cummings	1 August 1995 (aged 27)	1	1	(Football Australia) Central Coast Mariners
26	MF	Keanu Baccus	7 June 1998 (aged 24)	1	0	(Scottish Football Association) St Mirren
