= Wilf Billington =

English footballer (1930–2023)

- Billington in 1955

Personal information
- Full name: Wilfred Francis Billington
- Date of birth: 28 January 1930
- Place of birth: Blackburn, England
- Date of death: 1 October 2023 (aged 93)
- Place of death: Australia
- Height: 6 ft 1 in (1.85 m)
- Position: Goalkeeper

Youth career
- Rochdale

Senior career*
Years	Team	Apps	(Gls)
1948–1954	Blackburn Rovers	0	(0)
1954–1958	Workington	53	(0)
1958–1959	Headington United		
- Balgownie Rangers
- South Coast United
- Melbourne Hellas
Total		53+	(0+)
- * Club domestic league appearances and goals

Wilfred Francis Billington (28 January 1930 – 1 October 2023) was an English professional footballer who played as a goalkeeper in England and Australia. He began his career with Rochdale, later playing for Blackburn Rovers, Workington Reds, and Headington United. In Australia, Billington was best known as the goalkeeper for South Coast United's championship-winning side led by former England international Jim Kelly.

== Early life ==
Born in Blackburn, Billington attended St Alban's School. His schoolmates included Jack Walker, who went on to help the Blackburn Rovers win the Premier League in 1995.

== Professional career ==
After a brief stint at Rochdale, Billington joined Blackburn Rovers, his hometown club. He was with Blackburn for six years, playing regularly for the reserve team in the Central League.

In the summer of 1954, Billington was signed by Workington manager Bill Shankly as the cover goalkeeper for Malcolm Newlands. After Newlands was injured, Billington played the opening match of the 1954–1955 season at Darlington, which the club won 2–1. He made a total of 19 appearances during his first season, and 24 during his second.

Eighteen months into his transfer to Workington, the Liverpool Echo noted that Billington was regarded as "extremely promising", commending his performance at Prenton Park during his first season. Similarly, the Derby Evening Telegraph called Billington one of Shankly's best signings, noting that he had "developed into an extremely sound and reliable goalkeeper".

Shankly himself had told the press following the hard-fought match against the Tranmere Rovers that he predicted Billington would be selected as England goalkeeper within two years' time. In December 1955, when Shankly was confirmed to be moving to Huddersfield Town, the Lincolnshire Echo called Billington "one of the best [goalkeepers] in the Third North" and suggested that he was a natural choice to follow suit.

Over the course of his five-year Workington Reds career, Billington made a total of 55 League and Cup appearances, and kept 16 clean sheets. He also made 75 appearances for the Workington Reserves playing in the North Eastern League. In his final match for the club in 1958, he conceded 6 goals in a 6–3 defeat at Mansfield Town.

Billington moved south after his release by Workington manager Joe Harvey, transferring to Headington United, which later became Oxford United, for the 1958–59 season. He decided to emigrate to Australia after a two-year offer to move there. Later deciding to live there permanently, he played for Balgownie Rangers, South Coast United and Melbourne Hellas.

In 1963, Billington played for South Coast United in the New South Wales grand final, defeating APIA Leichhardt 4–0 for the title in front of a crowd of 30,158 at the Sydney Sports Ground. This broke the Australian attendance record at the time. The following week, Billington played in the 1963 Australia Cup against APIA, who enacted revenge against South Coast United. Whilst Billington played well, saving point-blank shots from Leo Baumgartner and John Giacometti, he was unable to prevent a 0–2 loss to APIA.

== Personal life ==
Billington returned to England in the mid-1960s after leaving South Coast United, but announced his return to Australia in 1966. He lived in Wollongong and worked in a steelworks, first as a fitter and then as a salesman.

At age 55, he obtained an honours degree from Wollongong University in Australia, and later worked for a politician. His son also played as a goalkeeper.

At the beginning of October 2023, Billington died at the age of 93.
