= Joe Vlasits =

Hungarian footballer and manager (1921–1985)

Personal information
- Full name: József Vlasits
- Date of birth: 1921
- Place of birth: Budapest, Hungary
- Date of death: 23 April 1985 (aged 64)
- Place of death: Sydney, Australia
- Position: Winger

Senior career*
Years	Team	Apps	(Gls)
1939–1940	Nemzeti	2	(1)

Managerial career
- 1958–1960: Canterbury-Marrickville
- 1961: Sydney Prague
- 1962: St George Budapest
- 1963–1964: Pan-Hellenic
- 1965: Bankstown
- 1966: SSC Yugal
- 1967–1968: Melita Eagles-Newtown
- 1967–1970: Australia
- 1972: Pan-Hellenic
- 1974: Northern Districts
- 1978: St George Budapest
- * Club domestic league appearances and goals

József "Uncle Joe" Vlasits (1921 – 23 April 1985) was a Hungarian football player and manager who coached the Australian national side from 1967 to 1970.

== Early life and playing career ==
Vlasits was born in 1921 in Budapest, Hungary. 1939–40 he played for Budapest First Division club Nemzeti but his career was cut short by injury and he moved to Australia in the late 1940s.

== Managerial career ==
In Australia, Vlasits moved into management, and coached New South Wales Division One side Canterbury-Marrickville from 1958 to 1960, winning titles in 1958 and 1960 and winning the Ampol Cup in '58. He then coached Sydney Prague and Budapest in 1961 and '62 respectively, winning the Division One title with both clubs. He then took over at fellow Division One side Pan-Hellenic for 1963 and '64, but could only manage fourth- and sixth-place finishes. He then dropped down a league to Division Two side Bankstown, which placed sixth in his only year of management, 1965. He returned to Division One in 1966 with strugglers SSC Yugal, which came third-last that season. A two-year stint at Melita Eagles-Newtown saw the club finish third-last in both the 1967 and '68 Division One seasons.

He coached the Australian national side from 1967 to 1970, and coached the team to victory in the 1967 Quoc Khanh Cup, winning all five matches they played. It was Australia's first international footballing honour. He coached Australia for a total of 23 games — 13 wins, seven draws, and three losses. In 1970 he took an Australian side to the Friendship Cup in Saigon, Vietnam. Later that year Rale Rasic was appointed his successor. Vlasits is credited having elevated Jonny Warren to Australian captain.

He returned to Pan-Hellenic for the 1972 season, and the team came seventh in Division One. He then managed Northern Districts to the Division Three title in 1974.

Joe Vlasits became in 1999 one of the original inductees to the Football Australia Hall of Fame.

== Death ==
Vlasits died at the age of 64 on 23 April 1985.

== Managerial statistics ==
Team	From	To	Record				
Team	From	To	G	W	D	L	Win %
Australia	1967	1970	23	13	7	3	56.52

== Honours ==
=== As a manager ===
Canterbury-Marrickville

- New South Wales Division One: 1958, 1960
- Ampol Cup: 1958

Sydney Prague

- New South Wales Division One: 1961

Budapest

- New South Wales Division One: 1962

Australia

- Quoc Khanh Cup: 1967

Northern Districts

- New South Wales Division Three: 1974
