= Ron McGarry =

Former English footballer and manager (born 1937)

Personal information
- Full name: Ronald James McGarry
- Date of birth: 5 December 1937 (age 88)
- Place of birth: Whitehaven, United Kingdom
- Position: Centre forward

Youth career
- Whitehaven

Senior career*
Years	Team	Apps	(Gls)
1958–1961	Workington	94	(25)
1961–1963	Bolton Wanderers	27	(7)
1963–1967	Newcastle United	121	(41)
1967–1968	Barrow	30	(4)
1968	South Coast United	?	(?)
1969	Bulli	?	(?)
1970	Balgownie Rangers	?	(?)
1970–1971	Barrow	17	(4)
Total		289	(81)

Managerial career
- 1972–1973: Gateshead
- * Club domestic league appearances and goals

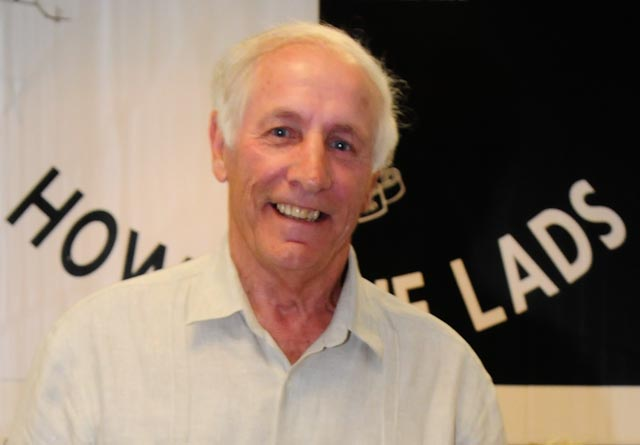
Ron McGarry, August 2010

Ronald James McGarry (born December 5, 1937) is an English former professional footballer, who played centre forward for Whitehaven, Workington, Bolton Wanderers, Newcastle United, Barrow, South Coast United, Bulli, Balgownie Rangers and Gateshead. McGarry played for Newcastle between 1963 and 1967, where he was nicknamed Cassius. He made 132 appearances and scored 46 goals.

Whilst playing for South Coast United in 1968, McGarry was the league's topscorer on 12 goals, shared with team-mate Dennis Alston.

Ron was famous for carrying printed cards with "Have goals will travel" on them, an idea he got from the 1960s TV western Have Gun Will Travel.

In 2009 The Fairs Club, a group of Newcastle United supporters, presented Ron with a football statuette with "Have Goals Will Travel" inscribed on it as thanks for his dedication to Newcastle United.
