= David Zeman =

Personal information
- Full name: David Zeman
- Place of birth: Czechoslovakia
- Position: Defender

Youth career
- Pennant Hills
- Ryde

Senior career*
Years	Team	Apps	(Gls)
- Sydney Prague
- West Ryde

International career
1969	Australia	3	(0)

Managerial career
- West Ryde
- Pendle Hill George Cross
- * Club domestic league appearances and goals

David Zeman (born 1942 in Czechoslovakia) is a former Association football defender.

== Playing career ==
=== Club career ===
Zeman played for Sydney Prague FC and West Ryde.

=== International career ===
David was involved in Australia's second attempt for World Cup qualification, in 1969 when they narrowly missed out after a 1–1 draw with Israel in the final playoff.

== Post-football career ==
Zeman lives nears Coffs Harbour. Though he is retired from full-time work, he works as an art teacher with the Woolgoolga Art Group.
