= Karen Menzies =

Indigenous Australian association footballer

Karen Menzies (born c.1962) is known for being the first Indigenous Australian association footballer in the Australia women's national soccer team. She played seven games for the Matildas in the period 1983–1989.

== Early life ==
Menzies grew up in the 1960s in North Ryde, New South Wales. She loved sports as a child, in particular soccer, influenced by the nearby Yugal Ryde.

At the age of 13, in 1976, she was removed from her adoptive parents and put into residential care, first for three months in Sydney and then five years in Newcastle, after she had been skipping school and experimenting with drugs and alcohol. She started playing with the local under-13s team there (for the first time first time playing in a girls' team) and at the age of 16 learnt about her biological parents.

She learnt that her mother was Aboriginal, and Menzies had been given to an Anglo-Scottish family, who were not told of her heritage, when she was around eight months old. Her birth mother had not given consent, and the adoption was not officially finalised. The exposure of these facts caused some distress, and she credits football with keeping her on track and alive. She used football to process her grief. She identifies as being of the Wonnarua people.

Menzies' natural athletic ability was recognised, and she also played cricket, water polo and touch football. However it was soccer in which she shone.

== Football career ==
Menzies represented Northern NSW from the age of 14 (1977), starting in the open-age team, and continued playing for them for 15 years. There she met longtime friend Renaye Iserief (who would also be a team-mate on the national team). As captain of Northern NSW won a national title.

In 1983, on her 21st birthday, she was selected for the Matildas, the first Indigenous woman to do so, and stayed in the national team for six years, during which time she played seven times.

Menzies coached while studying to be a social worker, among others coaching Cheryl Salisbury, Sunni Hughes, Alison Forman and Bridgette Starr, who is also Indigenous.

== Post-football career ==
Menzies later worked at the Australian Human Rights Commission and working on the National Inquiry into the Separation of Aboriginal and Torres Strait Islander Children from Their Families in the mid-1987. She wrote her PhD thesis on Aboriginal child protection, and as of 2021 lectures at the University of Newcastle.

In November 2021 Menzies was selected to be a member of Football Australia's inaugural National Indigenous Advisory Group.
