= Safeway United =

- Full name: Safeway United Soccer Club
- Nicknames: The Miners, The Villagers
- Founded: 1958 (as Corrimal United); 1961 (as South Coast United)
- Dissolved: 1974 (absorbed by Balgownie Rangers)
- Ground: Memorial Park, Corrimal; Balls Paddock, Woonona
- League: NSW First Division

Safeway United were a former football (soccer) club based in the Illawarra. They were formed by influential members of the Corrimal Rangers in 1958. For most of the club's existence they were known as South Coast United when they amalgamated with Woonona-Bulli Soccer Club in 1961 before changing their name to Safeway United in 1973 when they were financially backed by Safeway Motors. The club played in the NSW First Division before being absorbed by fellow Wollongong-based club, Balgownie Rangers prior to the creation of the first national league, the National Soccer League. This meant that the club played at the highest level of soccer in Australia for all 17 years of the clubs existence.

The club initially played its home matches out of Memorial Park, Corrimal when competing as Corrimal United (1958–1960) and Balls Paddock, Woonona from 1961 with the subsequent amalgamation with Woonona-Bulli Soccer Club.

Throughout its history, Safeway United won three minor premierships (in 1958, 1965 and 1969) as well as one grand final championship in 1963. The club was also a finalist in the 1963 and 1964 editions of the Federation Cup. They qualified for the NSW First Division Finals series seven times and the Australia Cup four times.

== History ==
The club was originally formed as Corrimal United from fifteen committeemen, including the Birch Brothers and Ken Bragg, and most of the playing squad of the association club, Corrimal Rangers in 1958. The club was created to enter the second season of the newly formed NSW Federation, a breakaway league of the NSW Soccer Association. The original Corrimal team, Corrimal Rangers, would continue to field a team in the 1958 NSW Association competition before returning to the Illawarra Association once the NSW Association was dissolved by the end of the season. United's first season was in the 1958 First Division season, the highest level of soccer in Australia at the time. The club had immediate success that year, winning the minor premiership at first attempt. They were unfortunate to lose the major semi-final to eventual winners, Canterbury-Marrickville and then the Final against Auburn in consecutive weeks of the final series to miss out on a chance at the championship grand final. In the pre-season Ampol-Kennard Cup, Corrimal lost to Hakoah in the semi-finals but redeemed themselves in the third place playoff final, defeating Prague on corner kicks after the match was drawn, 4–4. The end of season Federation Cup saw the team bow out in the first round to Concord. Significant inaugural players included international centre-forward, Keith Learmonth who was the league's top-scorer with 25 goals, veteran Ted Drain who played 28 out of the club's 29 matches and was widely regarded as one of the best inside-forwards's in the country, Bill Taylor who played every single game and named the "Mercury Soccer Star" for the season and defender Bob Bignall, who was the Australian captain at the 1956 Olympic Games.

The following season, Corrimal again performed strongly in the premiership, although their dominance was beginning to wane. By the end of the 26 rounds, Corrimal finished in third place with a record of 16 wins, 6 losses and 4 draws. Ron Burns played every game, and Keith Learmonth, Terry Orvad, Phil Peters and Bill Williams all only missed one match. Learmonth was the club's leading scorer with 19 goals, Burns and Tom Rowles scored 13. Left half, Bobby Young, was the league's joint-player of the season with Joe Vasvary of APIA Leichhardt. Keith Learmonth joined Young in the team of year at centre-forward. In the finals series, Corrimal were defeated 2–4 by Hakoah in the semi-finals.

In 1960, Corrimal turned in a poor season, only winning seven matches and finishing eleventh. Burns, Peters and Herman Egbers played in every league match of the season and Burns was the club's top scorer with 18 goals.

=== Amalgamation with Woonona-Bulli ===
After the poor showing in the 1960 season, Corrimal amalgamated with fellow Illawarra side Woonona-Bulli, a team who had previously competed and performed strongly in the NSW Association state league prior to its demise in 1958. The merged entity would be called South Coast United and play its home matches out of Balls Paddock, Woonona. The playing squad would consist mainly of the Corrimal side with a few players from Woonona. The club had high ambitions, signing "the little professor" Leo Baumgartner as captain-coach for the season. Unfortunately, Baumgartner was unable to impress his tactics on the team, losing the first four rounds of the premiership, culminating in a 2–7 loss at home to Sydney Hakoah. This led to a swap deal with APIA Leichhardt who were also winless after round 4. South Coast brought in goalkeeper, Max Trisic, half-back, Jim Harris and forwards, Marshall and Roberts for Baumgartner. They would also sign former Blackpool skipper, Jimmy Kelly on 7 May to take over coaching duties at player-manager. United would not win its first match until Round 8 at home, ironically against a Leo Baumgartner lead APIA. The match would also set a new ground record for attendance with 4,508 spectators. The rest of the season would not dramatically change fortunes for the club, as it missed the finals series, finishing in tenth place with only seven wins. Despite the team's poor result and missing the beginning of the season, captain-coach replacement for Baumgartner, Jimmy Kelly received the player of the season award.

South Coast was able to slowly build from its poor finish the previous season for the 1962 season. Kelly had brought in some new players to re-vitalise the team, including imports from England, Graham Barnett, Wilf Billington and Pat Woods, as well as Wim van der Gaag from the Netherlands. The inclusion of these players saw the team climb a few positions to finish the season in 8th position with ten wins. Its second grade and particularly, third grade sides performed quite admirably to earn the club the unofficial title of the club championship, with all three grades totalling 82 points.

=== 2 League titles and 2 Federation Cup finals ===

1963 NSW First Division starting lineup South Coast United 4 – 0 APIA Leichhardt

South Coast put together a much more commanding season in 1963, reaching the finals for the first time since 1959. At the close of the regular season, the club finished with 30 points in third position behind Prague (36) and APIA Leichhardt (31). Local left sided utility, Barry Salisbury, linked up with club following a spell at Canterbury-Marrickville and new UK recruits, John Doherty and Mike Johnson, played a key roles at centre-forward and inside forward, respectively. Unfortunately, team of the season right full-back, Pat Woods had to return home after 17 rounds, but Salisbury was shifted from a predominant mid-field role through the season to full back for the finals series. Local youth product, Max Tolson was then thrust into the finals series in mid-field, having not played a match during the regular season. South Coast thrashed fourth place side, Pan Hellenic 7–1 at the Sydney Sports Ground in the semi-final in front of 13,465 spectators. Graham Barnett starred in a match-winning performance, scoring four goals. United went on to narrowly beat Prague 3–2 in the preliminary final, with late goals from Barnett, Johnson and Doherty after the side trailed 0–2 mid-way through the second half to book their place in the grand final. The 1963 grand final was held on 22 September 1963 at the Sydney Sports Ground in front of a crowd of 30,158. This broke the record for the highest attendance for soccer in Australia. South Coast blew opponents APIA Leichhardt away, scoring three goals in the first fourteen minutes to effectively seal victory. The side added a fourth goal in the second half, courtesy of an own goal to take home the championship as 4–0 winners on the day. John Brownlie, who was a late inclusion, replacing team of the season centre-forward Doherty, started the match perfectly by scoring the first goal. Barnett then popped up with two goals of his own. Jimmy Kelly was credited as the player of the match, being awarded 6-stars for his performance. In the post-season, APIA enacted revenge on United, beating them in the first round of the 1963 Australia Cup. South Coast would continue their campaign through the 1963 NSW Federation Cup, defeating local rivals, Balgownie Rangers 2–1 in the quarter-finals and Gladesville-Ryde 1–0 in the semi-final replay. However, they were unable repeat the efforts of the league championship grand final, losing 1–2 to Hakoah at ES Marks Athletics Field in the Federation Cup final.

South Coast continued their good form from the previous season into 1964. As direct entrants to the quarter-finals for the Pre-season Cup they were unlucky not to progress further in the competition when they lost 0–3 to Budapest but they performed very solidly during the regular season. From the club's 22 matches, they finished with a record of 11 wins, 6 draws and 5 losses and 28 points. This earned them a spot in the finals series for the second consecutive season, finishing in third place. They faced Prague in the semi-finals and won 2–1 at the Sydney Sports Ground. Ultimately, they would fall one match short of the grand final, losing 1–2 to APIA Leichhardt in the preliminary final on 13 September. However, ten days later they would get revenge on APIA by defeating them 2–0 in the Federation Cup semi-final. They would line up against Budapest in the final on 27 September 1964. Unfortunately, not even a hat-trick scored by Graham Barnett was enough to clinch the title, South Coast losing 3–4. Budapest would once again prove to be a hoodoo for the club in the first round of the 1964 Australia Cup at Wentworth Park, defeating them for the third time in cup competitions this year.

The following season also showed much promise for the Illawarra team. They continued the previous season's form into the shortened 18-match regular season. They only lost four games on their way to 26 points to earn the minor premiership and a third consecutive finals series berth. However, disaster would strike, losing two consecutive matches to be bundled out of the championship in the preliminary final.

1966 would also prove to be a successful season for the club. The team was initially favoured to have quite a poor season due to significant player departures including the highly influential captain-coach Jimmy Kelly. Jim Harris would take over the role as player-manager for this season and relied heavily on more local youth talent such as Dennis Patterson, Errol Freeme and Peter Beattie. Freeme was the clubs leading scorer with 15 goals in all competitions. South Coast finished fourth during the regular season, once again making the finals series. This season, instead of the usual knockout format, a four-sided group phase was conducted with the top two teams advancing to the grand final. Unfortunately this would be a feat too great for the Illawarra side as they lost all three matches.

=== Late 1960's, 1969 minor premiership ===
In contrast, the 1967 season would ultimately be an extremely disappointing season overall. Veterans Salisbury, Ringland and Phil Carr continued under the guidance of player-manager Graham Barnett but the team would eventually finish the season in eleventh place with only four wins, narrowly avoiding relegation. No player was able to reach double figures in the scoring department across all competitions, Barnett the closest with 9.

United decided to bring back Jimmy Kelly after a two-year absence in an attempt right the wrongs of the previous season. He began the season as a player-manager but soon stopped playing in order to concentrate on coaching. The club also brought in the well regarded former English First Division player Ron McGarry to the club. The club also had the services of Max Tolson and George Ramage, as well as new recruits Adrian Alston, Joe McGrath and Tommy Anderson at their disposal. The club started the regular season in extraordinary fashion with two seven-goal hauls within the first four weeks of the competition. Kelly even claimed the club would make the semi-finals. After six rounds unbeaten by round 7, the club were winless in their following nine rounds which would ultimately cost them any chance of making of the finals series. There seemed to be alleged discontent at the club between Kelly and McGarry during the season. In the end, Kelly returned to England with two weeks left in the championship and was replaced by Anderson. Utilising bright, attacking tactics, the side won their final two games of the season against Polonia and Yugal. Even despite their poor results, Alston and McGarry were joint league topscorers with 12 goals.

Rewarded with his end of season coaching display, Anderson was initially signed on to coach for the 1969 season. After going through the pre-season with team, Anderson transferred to St George FC and his managerial duties fell upon a returning club legend, Jim Harris. United were very consistent throughout the season and gained good results early. However, with injury concerns over key players, Tristram, Stewart, Carr and Hennessey they were unable to win in the final four rounds of the regular season. However, this was enough to clinch the minor premiership, with a draw away to APIA Leichhardt. The finals series was conducted in a round robin format this season, and unfortunately the side was unable to turn around the late season form to win a place in the grand final. They finished third overall with APIA Leichhardt and St George playing off in the grand final.

=== Early 1970's ===
Tommy Anderson returned as player-manager for the 1970 season but only played in half of the games, with the side being firmly led by talismanic defender Peter Wilson. Unfortunately, the team lacked the cohesion of the previous season and was perilously close to relegation, finishing 11th. The side however performed admirably in the pre-season knockout competition, finishing fourth when they lost in the third place playoff 1–4 to St George-Budapest.

In 1971, Tommy Anderson departed the club to St George and by the start of the regular season, Jim Harris once again found himself in charge of the team. With largely a similar squad to the previous season, South Coast found themselves vying for premiership contention this time. They only narrowly missed the finals series, finishing in fifth place. With Max Tolson deployed predominantly in the forward line, he became the club's leading scorer with 13 goals in all competitions.

United signed Les Scheinflug as a non-playing manager with the view to re-instate itself back into the premiership finals, however they never really asserted any dominance throughout the season, especially without the services of Wilson this season. The team finished in eighth place to once again miss out on the finals.

=== Safeway United ===
The club then changed its name in 1973 after being financially backed by Safeway Motors to Safeway United. One of the club's first order of business was to secure the services of Adrian Alston, paying St George Budapest $5,000 to regain the services of the decorated clubman. The club also once again turned to Jim Harris for his services as a non-playing coach. Having a fairly balanced season, United finished with an 8–8–6 record, finishing 6th on the ladder with 24 points. This was unfortunately not enough to secure a finals series berth, meaning the club missed out on finals for the fourth consecutive year since winning the minor premiership in 1969. Captain Peter Wilson, was the only player to appear in all 22 league matches. With the NSW State Cup not being held this year, the only other tournament the team competed in was the pre-season Ampol Cup. Unfortunately, the team did not progress through the group stage of this tournament either.

The club's final season was in 1974, finishing sixth on the premiership ladder, yet again missing out on the finals. During the season, three players were selected for the 1974 FIFA World Cup to represent Australia. They were captain, Peter Wilson, Max Tolson and Adrian Alston. The club was absorbed by Balgownie Rangers for the 1975 season, taking their place in the First Division. Balgownie would play a further two seasons as Wollongong City before returning to the Illawarra Premier League as Balgownie Rangers.

=== Name changes ===
Years	Seasons	Name
1958–1960	3	Corrimal United
1961–1972	12	South Coast United
1973–1974	2	Safeway United

== Colours, grounds and support ==
On initial entry into the federation, Corrimal played in kits of their forebears, red and white and played at their home ground, Memorial Park in Corrimal.

After three seasons, it was decided that they required additional resources from members of the community and formed an amalgamation with local side, Woonona–Bulli creating South Coast United for the 1961 season. The side changed their home ground to Balls Paddock (Woonona Oval) and for the 1962 season, the playing kit somewhat reflected that of Woonona-Bulli, playing in a predominantly blue kit, with red and white trims of the Corrimal side.

By 1965, the team had returned to red and white kits but continued to play in Woonona for their home games until the team amalgamated with Balgownie Rangers in 1974.

In 1973, after Safeway took over financials of the club, the playing strip changed to yellow with red trim.

== Managerial history ==
Name	Years	Honours / notes
Bernard Bryant	1958–1960	1958 Premiership
Leo Baumgartner	1961	
Jim Kelly	1961–1965	1963 Grand Final winner, 1965 Premier, 1963 and 1964 Federation Cup finalist
Jim Harris	1966	
Graham Barnett	1967	
Jim Kelly	1968	Left with a few rounds in the season.
Tommy Anderson	1968–1969	Caretaker, then full-time appointment beginning of 1969 but departed after the pre-season.
Jim Harris	1969	Grand Final winner
Tommy Anderson	1970	
Jim Harris	1971	
Les Scheinflug	1972	
Jim Harris	1973	
Peter Wilson	1973–74	

== Honours ==
Safeway United's honours
Competition	Titles	Runners-up	Seasons
NSW First Division premiership	3	0	1958, 1965, 1969
NSW First Division championship	1	0	1963
Federation Cup	0	2	1963, 1964
