= Viv Chalwin =

English footballer and manager

- Chalwin in his later life

Personal information
- Birth name: Vivian James Chalwin
- Date of birth: 1916
- Place of birth: Epsom, England
- Date of death: 1980 (aged 63–64)
- Place of death: Sydney, New South Wales
- Position: Right half

Senior career*
Years	Team	Apps	(Gls)
????	Hull City		
????	Notts County		
????	Yorkshire Amateur		
1954	Leichhardt-Annandale		

Managerial career
- 1953: Australia
- 1954: Leichhardt-Annandale
- 1955: Granville
- * Club domestic league appearances and goals

Vivian James Chalwin OBE OMRI (1916–1980) was an English–Australian businessman, philanthropist, and football player and coach.

== Early life and time in England ==
Chalwin was born in 1916 in Epsom, England to shopkeepers James Adolphus Chalwin and Rose Rosita Rowley. In his 30s, he moved to Sydney in Australia.

== Business career and time in Australia ==
Chalwin was the chairman of British Oil Engines in Australia. He was fluent in English, French, German, Italian, Russian and Spanish. In Australia, he was president of the NSW Amateur Athletics Association, the Bombers Ice Hockey Club and patron of the New South Wales Ice Hockey Association. An ice hockey competition named after him, the Chalwin Cup, was contested for many years, ending in 1981.

== Football ==
In England, he played for Hull City, Notts County and Yorkshire Amateur, before moving into coaching in Australia. In Australia, he was in 1951 one of the co-founders of Sydney FC Prague, which he coached for four years, and in 1960. He also coached Granville and Leichhardt-Annandale, the latter as a playing coach. He also coached the Australian national side, starting in 1953.

== Chalwin Castle ==
Over many years, Chalwin converted his waterfront home in Cremorne, Sydney into a much larger, 18th century-inspired venue known as "Chalwin Castle". It housed a 300-seat theatre which hosted many performances during Chalwin's life. Musicians who sang or played there include Joan Sutherland, Roger Woodward, Pete Seeger and The Renaissance Players. It was demolished in January 1993 after being put up for sale the previous year.

== Honours ==
Chalwin was made an Officer of the Order of the British Empire in 1977, and was awarded the Order of Merit of the Italian Republic in 1980.

== Death ==
Chalwin died in 1980 in Sydney, leaving instructions that Chalwin Castle continue to be used for arts and music performances.

== Links ==
- "Exclusive: We uncover never before seen images of Chalwin Castle - and reveal the famous faces who partied there", Mosman Collective, 17 October 2018 (archived at archive.today)
- "Chalwin Castle Documentary", (video on YouTube, ca 10 mins.) Australian Broadcasting Corporation, ca. 1992
