= Ivo Rudic =

Australian soccer player

Ivo Rudić
Personal information
- Full name: Ivo Rudić
- Date of birth: 24 January 1942
- Place of birth: Split, Independent State of Croatia
- Date of death: 22 November 2009 (aged 67)
- Place of death: Split, Croatia
- Position: Defender

Senior career*
Years	Team	Apps	(Gls)
- Hadjuk Split
- Ryde
- Yugal
- Pan-Hellenic
- * Club domestic league appearances and goals

Ivo Rudić (24 January 1942 – 22 November 2009) was a soccer player who played in Yugoslavia for Hadjuk Split and in Australia for Yugal and Pan Hellenic. He was a member of the Australia team at the 1974 World Cup.

== Club career ==
Rudić played for Hadjuk Split before moving to Australia. In Australia, he played for Yugal and Pan Hellenic.

== National team ==
Rudić was a member of Australia national team for 1974 World Cup squad in West Germany, however he was an unused substitute during the tournament.
