= Jimmy Kelly (footballer, born 1931) =

English footballer (1931-2003)

Personal information
- Full name: James Kelly
- Date of birth: 11 November 1931
- Place of birth: Linton, Morpeth, England
- Date of death: 10 August 2003 (aged 71)
- Position: Defender

Youth career
- Blyth Spartans

Senior career*
Years	Team	Apps	(Gls)
1949–1954	Watford	119	(4)
1954–1961	Blackpool	198	(9)
1961–1965	South Coast United	103	(6)
1966–1968	Fleetwood	?	(?)
1968	South Coast United	8	(0)

Managerial career
- 1961–1965: South Coast United
- 1964: Australia
- 1968: South Coast United
- * Club domestic league appearances and goals

James Kelly (11 November 1931 – 10 August 2003) was an English footballer who played as a defender.

== Career ==
Born in Linton, Morpeth, Northumberland, Kelly started his career at Watford, who then played in Division Three South. He signed for Blackpool on 15 October 1954 for £15,000 and the promise of playing Watford in a friendly with the Seasiders, who were then playing in the First Division, the top flight in England. Kelly recalled of the events: "On the Friday I signed for Blackpool, within 24 hours I had travelled from London to Bramall Lane and was playing against Sheffield United. We got beaten 2–1 – and we desperately needed the points too – but meeting my new colleagues in the dressing room and having my first experience of Blackpool's polished style of play helped to make it an otherwise unforgettable day." He scored his first goal for the club later that season, on 26 February 1955 in a 3–1 defeat to West Lancashire rivals Preston North End. The following summer he toured with a Football Association XI, playing against Bermuda on 12 May 1955.

In October 1955 he had a transfer request turned down, and another request in January 1956 was also turned down. In 1958 he won another representative honour when he played for the FA XI against the Army. In the 1959–60 season he became Blackpool's club captain. He then gained his coaching certificate at Lilleshall. In May 1961, after 244 league and cup games for Blackpool, Kelly emigrated to Australia, where he joined South Coast United in New South Wales. He was voted Player of the Year by three newspapers in Sydney at the end of 1961: The Sydney Morning Herald, the Illawarra Mercury and the Sydney Daily Telegraph and won the American Health Studio Cup Player of the Year with an average of 4.875 points per game (from 1 to 6 rating) across his 16 competition matches.

Kelly went on to win the league Player of the Year on a further two occasions, in 1963 and 1965.

He was player-coach of South Coast United's 1963 championship-winning and 1965 minor premiership-winning seasons and went on to coach the Australian national team, as well as the New South Wales Federation. In the 1964–65 season he won the Sydney First Grade League competition with South Coast United. He was offered a new contract but chose instead to go back to England in 1965. He returned to the Fylde coast playing non-League football in the Lancashire Combination with Fleetwood in the 1966–67 season. In the summer of 1968 he returned to Australia for a second spell.

== After football ==
In 1965 Kelly established an insurance broker company, Jim Kelly & Co. Ltd, in Blackpool. The company still bears his name. Kelly died on 10 August 2003, aged 71.

== Career statistics ==
=== Club ===
Appearances and goals by club, season and competition
Club	Season	League (Note: Includes finals series for NSW First Division in regular season + finals format)			National cup (Note: Includes FA Cup, Australia Cup)		League cup (Note: Includes NSW Federation Cup)		Other (Note: Includes Ampol Cup)		Total	
Club	Season	Division	Apps	Goals	Apps	Goals	Apps	Goals	Apps	Goals	Apps	Goals
South Coast United	1961	NSW First Division	16+2	1	–		?	0	0	0	18	1
South Coast United	1962	NSW First Division	18	1	–		3	1	0	0	21	2
South Coast United	1963	NSW First Division	21+3	1	1	0	3	0	1	0	29	0
South Coast United	1964	NSW First Division	22+1	1	1	0	4	0	1	0	29	1
South Coast United	1965	NSW First Division	18+2	2	0	0	1	0	2	0	23	2
South Coast United	Total		103	6	2	0	11	1	3	0	119	7

== Honours ==
=== South Coast United ===
- NSW First Division Premiership: 1965
- NSW First Division Championship: 1963

=== Individual ===
- NSW First Division Player of the Season: 1961, 1963, 1965
- NSW First Division Team of the Season: 1961, 1963, 1965
