= Bob Bignall =

Australian soccer player (1922–2013)

Personal information
- Full name: Robert Bignall
- Date of birth: 14 March 1922
- Place of birth: Wollongong, Australia
- Date of death: 11 August 2013 (aged 91)
- Position: Right back

Youth career
- 1935–: Corrimal Rangers

Senior career*
| Years | Team | Apps | (Gls) |
- Woonona-Bulli
| 1945 | North Shore | | |
| 1950–1953 | Corrimal | | |
| 1960 | South Coast United | | |
| | Career Total: | 424 | |

International career
| 1954–1959 | Australia | 8 | (0) |
- * Club domestic league appearances and goals

Robert Francis "Choc" Bignall (14 March 1922 – 11 August 2013), commonly referred to as Bob Bignall, was an Australian soccer player who was the Australia captain at the 1956 Olympic Games held in Melbourne, Australia. Bignall started his career in 1939 and played over 400 matches in NSW for Corrimal Rangers, Woonona, North Shore and South Coast United as a defender before going on to represent both NSW and national sides as captain in the 1950s. He was inducted to the Football Federation of Australia Hall of Fame in 1999.

== Playing career ==
Bignall played for North Shore in 1945, then the Corrimal Rangers from 1950 to 1953 and for South Coast United in 1960 and 1961. All clubs were part of the NSW Division 1. He was a small stature man who had lightning speed and a tenacious will to win.

=== International career ===
Bignall played eight matches for the Australian national team between 1954 and 1956, and he was the 127th player to debut for his nation against New Zealand on 28 August 1954. He became the 16th captain of the national team against South Africa in Sydney on 24 September 1955. He was also the captain for both of the 1956 Summer Olympic games.

== Later life and death ==
After retiring from soccer, Bignall became a greyhound trainer.

Bignall died 11 August 2013 at the age of 91.
