= Tommy Anderson (footballer) =

Scottish footballer (1934–2018)

Personal information
- Full name: Thomas Cowan Anderson
- Date of birth: 24 September 1934
- Place of birth: Haddington, East Lothian, Scotland
- Date of death: 1 July 2018 (aged 83)
- Place of death: Normanhurst, Australia
- Position: Inside forward

Youth career
- Haddington Athletic

Senior career*
Years	Team	Apps	(Gls)
1955	Falkirk	1	(0)
1955–1956	Queen of the South	5	(1)
1957–1958	Watford	52	(12)
1958	Bournemouth & Boscombe Athletic	5	(1)
1958–1959	Queen's Park Rangers	10	(3)
1959–1960	Torquay United	9	(4)
1960–1961	Stockport County	60	(17)
1961–1962	Doncaster Rovers	16	(3)
1962–1963	Wrexham	12	(3)
1963	South Melbourne Hellas		
1963–1964	Barrow	11	(3)
1964	South Melbourne Hellas		
1964–1965	Watford	21	(2)
1965	St Mirren	7	(0)
1966–1967	George Cross		
1967–1968	Leyton Orient	9	(0)
1968	Limerick	7	(0)

Managerial career
- 1968: Limerick
- * Club domestic league appearances and goals

Thomas Cowan Anderson (24 September 1934 – 1 July 2018) was a Scottish professional footballer. He played as a forward, and was noted for his extremely fast pace.

Anderson was capped by Scotland schools, and had an amateur contract with Hearts. He began his professional career with Dumfries club, Queen of the South, in September 1955, leaving in November 1956.

Anderson joined Watford in January 1957. In his first spell with the club he made 52 league appearances, scoring 12 goals. Anderson moved to Bournemouth & Boscombe Athletic in June 1958 for a fee of £1,000, but in November the same year he moved to Queen's Park Rangers. He had only played five league games for Bournemouth, scoring once. He went on to score 3 times in 10 league games for Rangers in the 1958–59 season.

Anderson moved again in July 1959, signing for Torquay United. He made his debut on 22 August 1959, the first day of the 1959–60 season, in a 2–1 home win against Doncaster Rovers. In his season with Torquay he played in nine league games, scoring four times. In June 1960 he moved to Stockport County, where he was to play more regularly, playing 60 league games and scoring 17 goals in his time with the club.

In November 1961 he moved to Doncaster Rovers, where he was to score 3 times in 16 league games. He made another swift move, this time to Wrexham in March 1962, going on to play twelve league games and score three goals for the club.

Anderson subsequently moved to Australia, playing for Hellas before returning to England to join Barrow in December 1963. After only 11 league games he returned to Australia in February 1964 and rejoined Hellas. He rejoined Watford in December 1964, playing 21 league games and scoring twice for the Hornets in his second spell with the club. He joined St Mirren on a free transfer in October 1965, before leaving in December. He returned to Australia, playing for George Cross in Melbourne, before returning to England in July 1967 to join Leyton Orient for what was to be his final spell in English professional football. In December 1967 he became player-manager of Limerick. His contract was terminated in March 1968

Anderson eventually settled in Australia, working in Sydney as a football journalist and radio presenter. He died in Normanhurst on 1 July 2018, at the age of 83.
