= Jimmy Kelly (footballer, born 1933) =

Scottish footballer (1933-2020)

Personal information
- Date of birth: 4 June 1933
- Place of birth: Bellshill, Scotland
- Date of death: January 2020 (aged 86)
- Place of death: Peterborough, England
- Position: Centre forward

Senior career*
Years	Team	Apps	(Gls)
1954–1955	Peterborough United	30	(10)
1955–1957	Preston North End	0	(0)
1957–1958	Swindon Town	30	(14)
1958–1959	Walsall	8	(1)
- Yeovil Town
Total		68	(25)
- * Club domestic league appearances and goals

Jimmy Kelly (4 June 1933 – January 2020) was a Scottish professional footballer who played as a centre forward for Peterborough United, Preston North End, Swindon Town, Walsall and Yeovil Town. Kelly died in Peterborough in January 2020, at the age of 86.
