= Ron Lord =

Australian soccer player (1929–2024)

Ron Lord OAM
Personal information
- Full name: Ron Brian Lord
- Date of birth: 25 July 1929
- Place of birth: Balmain, New South Wales, Australia
- Date of death: 8 April 2024 (aged 94)
- Position: Goalkeeper

Youth career
- 1946–: Rozelle

Senior career*
Years	Team	Apps	(Gls)
1949	Drummoyne		
1950–1957	Auburn		
1957–1965	Sydney Prague		
Total		339	(0)

International career
1951–1964	Australia	10	(0)
- * Club domestic league appearances and goals

Ron Lord (25 July 1929 – 8 April 2024) was an Australian international soccer player who played as a goalkeeper during the 1950s. He appeared for the host nation in the 1956 Olympic Games staged in Melbourne. Lord played well in the defeat of Japan, but Australia was well-defeated by India where Neville D'Souza scored the first and, so far, only hat-trick by an Asian football team in either a FIFA World Cup or Olympic Games tournament.

Lord initially played for Australia in 1951, taking over goalkeeping duties from the well-known Norman Conquest in the Third Test against England played in Brisbane.

Lord died on 8 April 2024, at the age of 94.

Lord was posthumously awarded the Medal of the Order of Australia in the 2025 Australia Day Honours for "service to football".
