= Roy Blitz =

Australian former football player

Personal information
- Full name: Roy Blitz
- Date of birth: 23 November 1941 (age 84)
- Position: Forward

Youth career
- Fulham

Senior career*
Years	Team	Apps	(Gls)
1963–1965	Prague		
1965–1970	Pan Hellenic		
1971	Canterbury-Marrickville		

International career
1965–1968	Australia	6	(0)
- * Club domestic league appearances and goals

Roy Blitz (born 23 November 1941) is an Australian former football (soccer) player.

== Playing career ==
=== Club career ===
Blitz played in the NSW State League for Prague, Pan Hellenic and Canterbury-Marrickville. His £2,300 transfer in 1965 from Prague to Pan Hellenic was a league record.

=== International career ===
Blitz played six matches for Australia between 1965 and 1968.
