= Mike Johnson (footballer, born 1933) =

English footballer and manager

Personal information
- Full name: Michael Johnson
- Date of birth: 4 October 1933
- Place of birth: York, England
- Date of death: 19 July 2004 (aged 70)
- Place of death: Wollongong, Australia
- Position: Winger

Senior career*
Years	Team	Apps	(Gls)
1951–1952	Newcastle United	0	(0)
1954–1955	Blyth Spartans		
1955–1956	Brighton & Hove Albion	2	(0)
1956–1957	Gloucester City		
1957–1958	Fulham	23	(6)
1958–1962	Doncaster Rovers	15	(2)
1962	Barrow	12	(2)
1963	South Coast United		
1963–1964	Metropolitan Adriatic		
1965–1969	Sutherland Sharks		

Managerial career
- 1969–1972: Sutherland Sharks
- 1973–1974: St George Saints
- 1982: Blacktown City Demons
- 1983: Fairy Meadow
- 1992–1993: Bonnyrigg White Eagles
- * Club domestic league appearances and goals as of 18 March 2009

Michael Johnson (4 October 1933 – 19 July 2004) was an English professional association football player and manager.

Over the course of his playing career, Johnson turned out for Newcastle United, Blyth Spartans, Brighton and Hove Albion, Gloucester City, Fulham FC, Doncaster Rovers and Barrow all in England before moving to Australia and playing with South Coast United, Metropolitan Adriatic and Sutherland Sharks.

Johnson then turned his hand to management moving to the front office of the Sutherland Sharks before going on to manage St George Saints, Blacktown City Demons, Fairy Meadow before finishing his managerial career by claiming the treble of NSW Premier League Premiership, Championship and the NSW Waratah Cup in 1992 with the Bonnyrigg White Eagles.

Johnson died on 19 July 2004 in Wollongong after a long battle with illness.
