= Leo Baumgartner =

Austrian footballer (1932–2013)

Personal information
- Full name: Leopold Baumgartner
- Date of birth: 14 March 1932
- Place of birth: Vienna, Austria
- Date of death: 17 November 2013 (aged 81)
- Place of death: Coffs Harbour, New South Wales, Australia
- Position: Striker

Youth career
- WFC 20
- Wiener AC
- Rapid Wien

Senior career*
Years	Team	Apps	(Gls)
1951–1953	Kapfenberger SV		
1953–1958	Austria Wien	66	(40)
1958–1959	Sydney FC Prague		(49)
1960	Canterbury-Marrickville		(30)
1961	South Coast United	4	(2)
1961–1963	APIA Leichhardt		(47)
1964–1965	Sydney Hakoah		(6)

Managerial career
- 1961: South Coast United
- 1961–1963: APIA Leichhardt
- 1962: APIA Leichhardt
- 1962: Sydney Croatia
- 1965: Sutherland
- 1970: SSC Yugal
- 1972–1973: Sydney FC Prague
- 1974: Marconi Stallions FC
- 1975: Concordia College
- 2009: Coffs Coast Tigers
- 2011: Sawtell Scorpions
- * Club domestic league appearances and goals

Leo Baumgartner (14 March 1932 - 17 November 2013) was an Austrian-Australian football player and coach. He represented both Austria and Australia in non-official matches.

== Playing career ==
After playing youth football with Rapid Wien and Kapfenberger SV, Baumgartner began his senior career with Austria Wien. Between 1953 and 1958, Baumgartner played 69 times for the team from Vienna.

In 1957, Baumgartner toured Australia with FK Austria, playing a large part in the Austrian team winning nine of eleven matches. The following year, he and team-mate Karol Jaros were signed by Sydney team Prague without a transfer fee being paid to FK Austria. A complaint by the club led to the Australian Soccer Association being fined and suspended by FIFA over a series of similar transfer infractions.

=== South Coast and APIA ===
Baumgartner was managing a migrant canteen in Unanderra, close to the home of South Coast United. The Secretary of the club, Trevor Birch, convinced Baumgarter to join as a player-coach which included managing the junior teams also. Baumgartner struggled at the beginning of the season and had told the club that the prospects weren't bright for the season. APIA were also struggling at the time and their board member Jim Bayutti was trying to acquire Baumgarter's services to help rectify the situation. Baumgarter was agreeable to a transfer to APIA citing that he "was costing the club so much money" and "with the money Apia was prepared to pay, [they] could buy [the] players [necessary to build a good team]". The committees negotiated a deal which included the transfer of APIA players, Roberts, Marshall and Trisic for Baumgarter and his brother, Kurt, prior to the start of Round 5.

== Honours ==
=== Player ===
Prague

- NSW First Division Premier: 1959
- NSW First Division Champion: 1959
- Ampol Cup: 1959

Canterbury-Marrickville

- NSW First Division Champion: 1960

=== Coach ===
Yugal

- NSW First Division: 1970

=== Personal ===
- Football Australia Hall of Fame inductee: 2001
