= John Giacometti =

Australian soccer player (1936–2006)

John Giacometti (24 December 1936 – 2006) was an Australian former association football player who played as a midfielder.

== Club career ==
Giacometti played club football for APIA and the Marconi Club in the New South Wales State League.

== International career ==
Born in Italy, Giacometti played three matches for Australia, all against Scotland. He made his debut for the Socceroos on 28 May 1967 in Sydney and played his final match less than a week later on 4 June 1967.

== Playing statistics ==
=== Club ===
Appearances and goals by club, season and competition
Club	Season	League			State cup (Note: Federation Cup (NSWSF))		League cup (Note: Ampol Cup (NSWSF))		Total	
Club	Season	Division	Apps	Goals	Apps	Goals	Apps	Goals	Apps	Goals
APIA Leichhardt FC	1963	NSW First Division	24 (Note: 20 league appearances, 4 finals appearances)	22 (Note: 20 league goals, 2 finals goals)	?	?	4	4	28	26
APIA Leichhardt FC	1964	NSW First Division	12 (Note: 9 league appearances, 3 finals appearances)	10 (Note: 7 league goals, 3 finals goals)	2	1	3	3	17	14
