= Joe Marston =

Australian soccer player

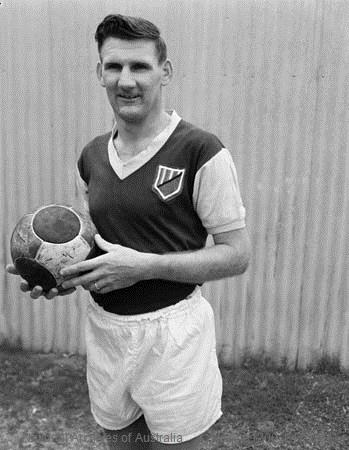
- Marston in 1964

Personal information
- Full name: James Edward Marston
- Date of birth: 7 January 1926
- Place of birth: Leichhardt, New South Wales, Australia
- Date of death: 29 November 2015 (aged 89)
- Position: Defender

Senior career*
Years	Team	Apps	(Gls)
1943–1949	Leichhardt-Annandale		
1950–1955	Preston North End	185	(0)
1955–1958	Leichhardt-Annandale		
1959–1964	APIA Leichhardt		
1969	Western Suburbs		

International career
1947–1958	Australia	13	(0)

Managerial career
- 1958: Australia (Player-Coach)
- 1965: APIA Leichhardt
- 1966: Australia
- 1966: APIA Leichhardt
- 1967–1969: Western Suburbs
- 1972–1973: APIA Leichhardt
- 1974–1977: Auburn
- 1978–1979: Sydney Olympic
- * Club domestic league appearances and goals

James Edward "Joe" Marston MBE (7 January 1926 – 29 November 2015) was an Australian association footballer who played as a defender. He became the first Australian to appear in a FA Cup Final when he turned out for Preston North End in their 1954 defeat to West Bromwich Albion.

== Biography ==
Marston was 28 when he played at Wembley Stadium alongside Tom Finney and Tommy Docherty. After the War, Marston had played for Leichhardt-Annandale in Division 1 of the New South Wales State League, supplementing his income by working as a painter and life-guard.

In December 1949, Marston received correspondence from a scout in England who had watched him play, informing him that Preston wished to offer him a trial. Their interest was such that they paid for Marston's wife, Edith, to join him on the journey to England.

Marston spent time in the reserves, until an injury to Harry Mattinson enabled him to get a run in the first team during the Second Division title season in 1951 and losing out to Arsenal for the 1952–53 season on goal average; remaining at centre-half at Deepdale as an ever-present until 1954, making 154 appearances and being selected for the Football League side against the Scottish Football League XI. Marston eventually returned to Australia in 1956 because of homesickness, despite pleas from Preston to stay. Marston was also the target of a purported 80,000 pound transfer offer made by Arsenal.

=== International career ===
Marston was an Australian football international appearing for the Socceroos during Blackpool's 1958 tour of Australia in which Stanley Matthews appeared; and appearing and coaching the national side during Hearts tour of the country in 1959.

=== Retirement ===
Joe Marston and his wife Edith retired on the New South Wales Central Coast and maintained their passionate interest in association football.

== Recognition ==
Marston was awarded an MBE (1980) and an Australian Sports Medal (2000) for services to his sport. He was inducted into the Sport Australia Hall of Fame in 1988.

Marston is an inductee into the NSW Hall of Champions. In September 2008, he was a recipient of one of the two inaugural Alex Tobin Medals awarded by the Australian Professional Footballers Association. The Joe Marston Medal, awarded to the man of the match in the A-League and National Soccer League grand finals, was named in his honour. In January 2012, Marston was featured on a postage stamp issued by Australia Post in a series commemorating notable Australian footballers from several codes.

== Death ==
On 29 November 2015, it was announced that Marston had died of natural causes after having been in frail health for a while.

== Honours ==
Preston North End

- FA Cup runner-up: 1953–54
