= Les Scheinflug =

Soccer player (born 1938)

Les Scheinflug AM
Personal information
- Full name: Ladislav Scheinflug
- Date of birth: 1 October 1938 (age 88)
- Place of birth: Bückeburg, Germany
- Positions: Midfielder; striker

Senior career*
Years	Team	Apps	(Gls)
1957–1968	Sydney Prague		
1969	Club Marconi		
1971	Canterbury-Marrickville		

International career
1965–1968	Australia	6	(4)

Managerial career
- 1969: Marconi Fairfield
- 1971: Canterbury-Marrickville
- 1972: South Coast United
- 1973: Sydney Croatia
- 1974: Australia (assistant coach)
- 1974–1975: Western Suburbs
- 1977: Brisbane Lions SC
- 1978: Adelaide City
- 1979–1986: Marconi Fairfield
- 1981–1984: Australia
- 1987–1990: Blacktown City
- 1990: Australia
- 1994: Australia
- 2002: Fiji
- 2004–2005: Marconi Fairfield
- 2006: Sydney Olympic
Medal record
Representing Australia
Men's Association football(as manager)
OFC U-20 Championship
Winner	1997 Tahiti
- * Club domestic league appearances and goals

Ladislav "Les" Scheinflug AM (born 1 October 1938) is a former professional soccer player and manager. Born in Germany, he played for the Australia national team.

== Biography ==
Arriving in Australia in the early 1950s he lived as a youth at Villawood Migrant Hostel and played for the hostel soccer team (Villawood Tigers) He was picked to play in the Southern Districts representative soccer team during these years

Between November 1965 and April 1968 Scheinflug played six full international matches for Australia, scoring four goals.

Before the 1974 World Cup Scheinflug became assistant to head coach Rale Rasic of the national side. He later served himself on several occasions as head coach of the Socceroos as well as the under 17 and 20 sides.

In 1979 Scheinflug won the Australian Championship and in 1980 the Australian Cup, both with Marconi Fairfield. In 1979, he was voted Coach of the Year by the Australian Soccer Press Association.

In the 2000 Australia Day Honours Scheinflug was awarded an AM (Member of the Order of Australia) for services to soccer as a national player and coach.

== Honours ==
=== Manager ===
Australia U-20

- OFC U-20 Championship: 1997

=== Individual ===
- Australian Hall of Fame Inaugural Inductee
- Australian National Team Coach
- Australian Youth Team Coach
- 1979 NSL Coach of the Year
- New South Wales Representative Honours
- 1959 - Northern New South Wales
- 1965 - Torpedo Moscow, Chelsea
- Representative Honours
- 1959 - NSWSF XI v The Rest
- 1965 - Sydney XI v Torpedo (c), Sydney XI v Hapoel Tel Aviv
