= Tiko Jelisavčić =

Association football player and association football manager (1929–1986)

Personal information
- Full name: Tihomir Jelisavčić
- Date of birth: 1929
- Place of birth: Užice, Yugoslavia
- Date of death: 29 June 1986 (aged 56–57)
- Place of death: Cancún, Mexico
- Position: Striker

Senior career*
Years	Team	Apps	(Gls)
1953–1954	Partizan		
1954–1956	BSK Belgrade		
1956–1958	Vardar		
1962	Yugal		
1962	Toongabbie		
1964	Makedonia (Melbourne)		

Managerial career
- 1962–1963: Yugal
- 1965: Hakoah
- 1965: Australia
- 1965: Hakoah
- 1974–1978: Nigeria
- 1985–1986: Pioneros de Cancún
Medal record
Men's football
Representing Nigeria (as manager)
Africa Cup of Nations
Bronze medal – third place	1976
Bronze medal – third place	1978
- * Club domestic league appearances and goals

Tihomir "Tiko" Jelisavčić (Serbian Cyrillic: Тихомир Тико Јелисавчић; 1929 – 29 June 1986) was a Yugoslav football coach.

== Playing career ==
Jelisavčić played for Partizan in the 1953–54 season. He scored his only official goal for the club in his sole league appearance, against Proleter Osijek (3–2 win), and added one game in the Yugoslav Cup (quarterfinals against Dinamo). Tiko was part of the Partizan squad which participated in the famous South American tour of winter 1953–54.

He won the Yugoslav Cup in 1955 with BSK Belgrade.

== Coaching career ==
He managed the Australia national soccer team and Nigeria national football team during his career. During his time as Nigeria's coach he was referred to as "Father Tiko".

He presided over the Australian national team in their first ever FIFA World Cup qualifying games in 1965. Australia lost 6–1 and 3–1 in the First round.

He led Nigeria to two third-place finishes in the Africa Cup of Nations tournament in 1976 and 1978.

He was unveiled as technical director/coach of Pioneros de Cancún on 22 June 1984, a position he held until he died in a car crash on 29 June 1986.
