= Max Tolson =

Australian soccer player (born 1945)

Personal information
- Full name: Maxwell Tolson
- Date of birth: 18 July 1945 (age 81)
- Place of birth: Wollongong, Australia
- Position: Striker

Youth career
- Balgownie

Senior career*
Years	Team	Apps	(Gls)
1963–1965	South Coast United		
1965–1967	Workington	31	(6)
1967–1971	South Coast United		
1972–1973	Club Marconi		
1974	Safeway United	17	(5)
1975	Sydney Croatia		

International career^{‡}
1971–1973	Australia	16	(4)
- * Club domestic league appearances and goals as of 12 May 2007 ‡ National team caps and goals as of 12 May 2007

Maxwell "Max" Tolson (born 18 July 1945) is an Australian former soccer player who played as a forward. He was a member of the Australian 1974 World Cup squad in West Germany and represented Australia 16 times in total.
