= Sydney FC Prague =

Australian soccer club

The Sydney Football Club Prague, commonly known as Sydney Prague or just Prague, was a former association football club formed in 1951 by predominantly Czech Australians, which participated in the NSW State League from its foundation in 1957 until its amalgamation with Yugal at the beginning of the 1973 season.

Sydney Prague were one of the most successful sides of the late 1950s and early 1960s, consistently finishing high in leagues and cups. Prague were one of the first club sides to bring fast, attacking European style play to Australia, due to the influx of European ex-international players to the club in the late 1950s. Formemost was the hiring of the Austrian Leo Baumgartner in 1958, who became the hottest star in Sydney soccer with his arrival.

== History ==
Prague was the home of many Australian and ex-European representative footballers throughout the 1960s and early 1970s. Prague was instrumental in the strengthening of Australian football throughout its time, and had strong player and coaching links with the Australia national football (soccer) team. In 1950 Vivian J (Jimmy) Chalwin, a former English amateur player came across a number of Czech boys playing soccer at Rushcutters Bay and ended up playing regularly with them every Sunday afternoon. After a few weeks Jerry Vilimek asked Chalwin if he thought they could form a team and enter a competition. On J. Chalwin's initiative a first meeting was held at the Y.M.C.A. and shortly afterwards the Sydney Football Club Prague was formed and two teams were nominated to play in the N.S.W. Metropolitan League. The first general meeting was held in the Premier Restaurant, Kings Cross, and J. Vilimek was elected president; J. Chalwin, vice-president; V. Profanta, Secretary; J. Baca, Treasurer and W.R. Ball Public Relations Officer. Mr Stan Slavik who provided the first boots, Jerseys and balls was made Patron of the club. Chalmers, who held a coaching certificate from the English FA, served also as coach for the first four years. Chalwin was also a successful businessman and known to arrive to his coaching appointments in his Rolls-Royce. He also coached the club in 1960.

In its first year they almost finished as premiers, being beaten in the final. In 1952 the Club won its first trophy, the Metropolitan Cup and in 1953 they won the Metropolitan League. One of its most notable players was Milos Muller who was a prolific goal scorer and headed the goal-scoring list year after year. He scored a total of 378 goals for his Club and in 1955 scored 55 goals. Milos Muller was Prague's first Australian International when he as a centre-forward was chosen to play in the Australian team to play South Africa at the Sydney Cricket Ground in September 1955.

From 1951 to 1953 S.F.C. Prague was basically an all Czech team which included players such as M. Muller, K. Lender, O. Toula, P.Janovsky, V.Vohanka, J Horinek, F. Dubai and J. Polivka. Also in 1953 the committee was enlarged and Mr K. Rodny became president; Mr Garden, vice-president; J. Bruna, V. Sarka, Z. Hofer, O. Pick and J. Prazak also joined. Finally in 1955, Prague, after winning the Metropolitan League twice, was promoted to the Southern League, and won it outright by beating Sydney Austral in the final. Prague's first year in the State League was rather disappointing as the team finished near the bottom of the competition although most games were lost by an odd goal. Despite this, the team was enjoying the reputation of being the fairest team in the competition and playing the continental short passing game.

In January 1957 Prague, became one of the foundation clubs of the N.S.W. Federation, rebuilt the team, released many players to nearer clubs (without any transfer fees), signed new players such as goalkeeper Ron Lord, Ken Hiron, Erich Schwartz. Also new players like Les Scheinflug and Geoff Geddes combined well with the rest of the team, where old-timers Muller and Otakar "Otto" Toula still played. Prague gained notable victories against strong clubs like Canterbury, Gladesville and finished the season near the top of the table.

In March 1958 Austrian Internationals Leopold Baumgartner and Karl Jaros joined Prague from FK Austria Vienna and later they were followed by Andy Saghi, Erich Schwartz, Walter Tamandl, Herbert and Erwin Ninaus.

== Legacy ==
Prague were the first Australian side to fully sponsor a tour by an overseas club., in 1964 guaranteeing Swiss champions FC Basel a sum of £1785 in an attempt to persuade Basel's then Czech coach, Georges Sobotka to accept a position at Prague. Although Sobotka went on to coach the Switzerland national football side, the tour was a success, turning over more than £5000 and paving the way for future overseas tours of Australia. The game ended in a 2–2 draw.

In 1965, Chelsea FC manager and former Scotland international, Tommy Docherty was offered a guest stint with Prague in a friendly against VfB Stuttgart after taking the '64–'65 League cup with Chelsea. Docherty, still a registered player at the time, accepted and was granted permission by Chelsea. Docherty was to return to Sydney in the early 1980s, as coach of Sydney Olympic and South Melbourne.

The fixture was deemed a great success, with over 6,000 people cramming ES Marks Athletics Field for a high quality encounter, Stuttgart taking the tie 3–1. In an interesting turn of events, Stuttgart's coach at the time, Rudi Gutendorf returned to Australia four years later and took up a position coaching the national side during Australia's qualification bid for the 1978 World Cup.

== Achievements ==
- NSW State League

- Regular Season Premiers (4): (1959, 1960, 1961, 1963)
- Champions (1): (1959)
- Runners up (1): (1960)

- AMPOL Cup

- Winners (6): (1959, 1961, 1962, 1964, 1965, 1969)

- Federation Cup

- Runners up (1): (1958)

== Former players ==
- (England) Alick Jeffrey, Striker and Doncaster Rovers legend. Former President of Doncaster Rovers FC.
- (Australia) Ron Lord, Australian goalkeeper (1951–1964).
- Geoff Sleight, Australian forward (1965) who played in Australia's first World Cup team.
- (Australia) Roy Blitz, Australian forward (1965–1968).
- Gary Manuel, Australian striker who went on to play for Australia in the 1974 World Cup (1969–1975).
- (Australia) Ray Rootsey, Australian Sweeper (1970–1974).
- (England) Brian Green, Coach of the Australian national football team (1975–1976).
- (Austria) / (Australia) Leo Baumgartner, Former Austrian international (1955–1957) who played for Australian in a friendly visit by Everton in 1964. Immigrated to join Prague in 1958 as player-coach until February 1960. Went on to coach Prague (1972–1973).
- (Czechoslovakia) / David Zeman, Australian defender involved in Australia's 1970 World Cup campaign (1969).
- (Scotland) / (Australia) Jimmy Rooney, Australian midfielder (1971–1980) involved in the 1974 World Cup.
- (Austria) / (Australia) Herbert Ninaus, Austrian (1958 World Cup) and later, Australian international winger.
- (Germany) / (Australia) Les Scheinflug, Australian midfielder (1959–1968) and coach of the Australian national team (1981–1983 and 1990–1994).
- (Argentina) / (Australia) Raul Blanco, Coach of the Australian national football team (1996–1997).
- (Netherlands) Wim van der Gaag, Dutch forward

== Former managers ==
- Jozef Venglos, Held various high-profile coaching roles including Australia, Czechoslovakia, Aston Villa and Celtic.
- (England) Harry Brophy, Arsenal (1936–1938) defender and coach of Australia (1954–1955).
- Štefan Čambal, Manager and player for Czechoslovakia, who played in the 1934 FIFA World Cup final against Italy.
