= SSC Yugal =

S.S.C. Yugal
- Full name: Sydney Soccer Club Yugal
- Founded: 1956–57
- Dissolved: 1992
- Ground: Liverpool Showground, ES Marks Athletics Field, Concord Oval, Mona Park, Ernie Smith Reserve
Home colours	Away colours

SSC Yugal (Sydney Soccer Club Yugal), also known as Yugal, Yugal Ryde, Ryde-Yugal, Yugal-Prague, Auburn Yugal, Liverpool Yugal, is a defunct soccer club from Sydney, Australia. The club, formed by Yugoslav immigrants in the mid-1950s, was originally known as Dalmatinac due to the Dalmatian origins of most of its founders. It competed initially in the Granville District competition before joining the New South Wales Federation of Soccer Clubs' Second Division Competition in 1958, the same year as other former giants of soccer in New South Wales, Pan-Hellenic, later known as Sydney Olympic FC, and Polonia.

The club experienced fierce rivalries with Sydney Croatia and White Eagles (later Avala), due to these clubs' large Croatian and Serbian supporter bases and Yugal's Yugoslav-orientated supporter base. Fierce rivalries of an underlying political nature were also experienced with the soccer clubs of Venezia-Giulia (now defunct) with its Italo-Istrian supporter base and Blacktown City. Yugal merged with former Champion Club Prague to be known as Yugal-Prague from the 1973 season until late in the 1970s when they became known as Sydney Soccer Club Yugal. The Yugal-Prague licensed club was originally located in Pagewood, and later, as S.S.C. Yugal, the licensed club moved to Haymarket.

The club won the inaugural Australia Cup in 1962, and inspired local children through the 1960s, including the first Indigenous Australian to become a Australia women's national women's team, the Matildas, Karen Menzies.

The club struggled to survive once the Former Yugoslav States began to gain independence in the late 1980s and early 1990s, and unsuccessful mergers were attempted with Auburn and Liverpool before ultimately disbanding in 1992.

== History ==
Yugal, formerly called Dalmatinac, came into being in 1956 when several young Yugoslav immigrants, mainly coming from Dalmatia, got together to kick a ball around a park in Liverpool. Martin (Marin) Batistic first thought of forming a club and as a player and an organiser he did much to help put the club on its feet. Martin died in 1959 and did not live to see the fulfilment of his ambitions for the club. Another tireless worker for the club was Ivan Pudarich, who was first a player, then became president in 1958.

The Club soon attracted the interest of some local compatriots. Anton Curac, George and Maurice (or Mark) Posa, Peter Pecotich, Frank Stanich and Morrie Kastelan were active committee members in the early days.

Banner commemorating 1957 Robinson Cup victory

Dalmatinac entered the Granville District Junior competition in 1957 and won the Robinson Cup. The following year they were granted admission to the NSW Federation of Soccer Clubs and won their way to Second Division where they met with moderate success.

During 1960, the club strengthened its committee, Mick Alagich was elected Secretary and Dr. Lintner was elected president and the club was successful in securing the use of Concord Oval. It was then decided to change the name of the club to Yugal, the aim to become representative of the whole Yugoslav community in Sydney.

In 1960 Yugal added three top class players imports from Yugoslavia – Boris Krstulovich, captain-coach and centre-half, Sam Ivanisevich, a clever inside forward, and Tony Nincevich, a prolific goal-scoring centre-forward.

Other additions to the side in 1960 were Kurt Spiegel, goalkeeper and Frank Aranyi, wing-half, both from Hakoah, Johnny Mucillo, winger from Auburn, and Brian Robinson, winger from Manly.

These seven players together with Jakov Fiajmenco, Luci Bogdanovich, Steve Lorik, Peter Grbavac, Mike Petkovich and Andy Novak, formed the squad that for most of the season kept Yugal on top of the second division competition.

A notable addition to this squad was Tiko Jelisavčić, a brilliant inside-forward who played and toured the world with top Yugoslav club Partizan and who was flown to Sydney just in time to help Yugal win the all-important game against Balgownie and win promotion to the First Division.

Yugal's first match in the top flight took place at Lambert Park against APIA Leichhardt on Saturday 7 April 1962, and recorded a 1–5 loss before a crowd of 2,400. The club's first success in the First Division came at the expense of future long-time rivals St. George Budapest (then known solely as Budapest), at Macarthur Park (now F.S. Garside Park), 4–3 before a crowd of 2,676. Yugal's goal scorers that day were T. Jelisavčić 3 and M. Stojanovich. Yugal's crowning success was winning the Australian Soccer Federation's Australia Cup in its inaugural year by defeating St. George Budapest by 8–1 at Wentworth Park before a crowd of 11,014 on 9 December 1962 (goalscorers: Tiko Jelisavčić (4), Eric Schwartz (2), Tony Nincevich and Slavko Pacanin).

== Honours ==
- Australia Cup Winners: 1962
- NSW State League First Division Grand Final Winners: 1970
- NSW State League First Division Semi-Finalists: 1962, 1965, 1971
- NSW State League Second Division Champions: 1961, 1981
- NSW State League Third Division: Champions: 1986
- NSW Ampol Cup Winners: 1963
- NSW Ampol Cup Runners-Up: 1965
- NSW Ampol Cup Semi-Finalists: 1962, 1966, 1971, 1973
- NSW Federation Cup Semi-Finalists: 1965, 1966, 1967, 1971, 1972
