= Australia Cup (1962–1968) =

Defunct annual single-elimination soccer competition

- Organiser(s): Australian Soccer Federation
- Founded: 1962; 64 years ago
- Abolished: 1968
- Region: Australia
- Most championships: Sydney Hakoah (2 titles)

The Australia Cup was an annual knockout soccer competition in men's domestic Australian soccer. First played during the 1962 season, it was the first national soccer competition in Australia.

The inaugural season of the tournament was contested by biggest teams from Sydney, Melbourne, Brisbane, Adelaide and Newcastle. In 1963 the Australia Cup grew to take in teams from throughout Tasmania, and from 1964 Perth and Canberra clubs were represented, giving the competition a truly national feel.

Played throughout football's first real boom period in the 1960s, the Australia Cup was a refreshing competition for the sport. Though as the tournament grew, interstate travel provided difficulties and the decision was taken to abolish the Australia Cup after the 1968 season. However, the new national stage in which the tournament provided fuelled an expansionist desire across the big state league clubs ultimately leading to the creation of Australia's first national league in the 1970s, the National Soccer League.

In its seven-season run, six clubs from around Australia won the tournament, with Sydney Hakoah the only team to win it on two occasions.

== History ==
The origins of the Australia Cup are stemmed from September 1961, when Henry Seamonds, chairman and Treasurer of the NSW Federation of Soccer Clubs, met with Victorian counterparts at a time when the Australian Soccer Football Association was suspended by FIFA. Seamonds put forward plans to not only form a new national governing body for the sport, but to also create a national knockout cup. The competition was ambitious, with clubs to be flown to Sydney for matches that were to be played over a five-week period starting later that year. Although the tournament did not go ahead, in November of that year Seamonds summoned a meeting of all state representatives to Sydney. There the Australian Soccer Federation was formed with Seamonds made chairman, and in 1962 the Australia Cup was founded.

Initially the competition was confined to clubs from New South Wales, Victoria, Queensland and South Australian, with the draw including 16 teams - four each from Victoria and the Sydney competition in New South Wales, three from South Australia and Queensland, and two from Northern New South Wales. The inaugural season of the Cup was won by Yugal who defeated St George Budapest 8–1 at Wentworth Park in the final. The third place playoff, between Juventus and Juventus (from Melbourne and Adelaide respectively), was won by the South Australian team on penalty kicks.

The 1963 season saw four Tasmania teams taking part, with the big Sydney and Melbourne clubs entering the tournament in the second round. The final was contested by two Melbourne clubs, with Port Melbourne Slavia beating Polonia Melbourne 3–2 in a replay, after a scoreless draw. In the final, Des Palmer scored a hat-trick for the winners. Melbourne's George Cross went on to win in 1964 after downing APIA Leichhardt from Sydney by three goals to two in front of a 15,000 crowd at Olympic Park Stadium. Archie Campbell scored the winner in extra-time. The following year Sydney Hakoah beat APIA Leichhardt by the same score, but in 1966 APIA claimed the title against Hakoah.

In the final of 1967, Melbourne Hungaria defeated APIA 4–3 at Olympic Park Stadium. Former Irish international and Manchester City player Bill Walsh was coach, and Australian international Attila Abonyi scored a hat-trick for the winning side.

In what proved to be the final year of Australia Cup in 1968 Hakoah clubs of Melbourne and Sydney won through to the final, with the Sydneysiders triumphing over Melbourne Hakoah by six goals to one over two legs.

The prize money for the first season of competition was A£5,000, claimed to be the richest football prize in the country. Fred Villiers, in the Victorian Soccer News wrote that the first competition was so successful the New South Wales rugby league administration had stolen the idea to promote their game. Yet the Australia Cup never proved to be a financial success. Supporters were more interested in domestic league competitions and visits by overseas touring sides than they were in interstate club competitions. The tournament proved that a national cup competition could be staged, but also showed up many of the problems of such a concept. If strictly knock-out from the beginning it risked losing the big draw-cards early, while a seeded draw potentially reduced the attractiveness to smaller teams who might be faced with prohibitive travel costs if they succeeded in getting through early rounds. Though the Cup was also an early indication that the focus of the game in the Australia was beginning to shift away from a state level towards a national and international level. In 1965 Australia attempted qualification for the FIFA World Cup for the first time, and just over a decade later the first national league in Australia of any of the football codes was established - the National Soccer League.

== Trophy ==
The Australia Cup trophy was a large silver traditional cup style trophy. It had two handles with a laurel wreath design on the underside and figures studded on the top of each handle. The trophy featured a football as a trim on the very top of the cup lid, and it was mounted on a wooden base which had silver plates attached with the names and years of Cup Champion inscribed. After the passing of founding Australian Soccer Federation Chairman, Henry Seamonds, in 1963, the name The Henry Seamonds Memorial Trophy was also inscribed on the trophy.

The legacy of the Australia Cup trophy extends to the FFA Cup. Established in 2014 as the first national cup competition that encompasses clubs on all levels of the Australian league system, the design of the tournaments trophy was influenced by that of the historic Australia Cup trophy.

The cup disappeared for decades, only to be discovered in a rubbish skip in 2011 by builders who were carrying out renovations at the Hakoah club in Sydney. FFA chairman Chris Nikou attended the Caroline Springs George Cross (formerly Sunshine GC) versus Preston Lions NPL game of August 2019, and left the trophy into the safe keeping of the George Cross administration.

== Results ==
Seasons	Champion	Score	Runner-up	Venue	Ref
1962	Yugal	8–1	St George Budapest	Wentworth Park, Sydney	
1963	Port Melbourne Slavia	0–0 (a.e.t.); 3–2 (a.e.t.) (replay)	Polonia Melbourne	Olympic Park Stadium, Melbourne	
1964	George Cross	3–2 (a.e.t.)	APIA Leichhardt	Olympic Park Stadium, Melbourne	
1965	Sydney Hakoah	1–1 (a.e.t.), 14–14 (p) (Note: penalty shootout abandoned in favour of a replay, due to diminishing light.); 2–1 (replay)	APIA Leichhardt	Wentworth Park, Sydney; Sydney Showground, Sydney	
1966	APIA Leichhardt	2–0	Sydney Hakoah	Wentworth Park, Sydney	
1967	Melbourne Hungaria	4–3	APIA Leichhardt	Olympic Park Stadium, Melbourne	
1968	Sydney Hakoah	3–0; 3–1	Hakoah Melbourne	Wentworth Park, Sydney (1st leg); Middle Park, Melbourne (2nd leg)	

== Records and statistics ==
=== Final ===
==== Teams ====
- Most wins: 2:
  - Sydney Hakoah (1965, 1968)
- Most appearances in a final 4
  - APIA Leichhardt (1964, 1965, 1966, 1967)
- Most Final appearances without ever losing: 2:
  - Sydney Hakoah (1965, 1968)
- Longest gap between wins: 2 years, Sydney Hakoah (1965–1968)
- Biggest win: 7 goals
  - Yugal 8–1 St George Budapest (1962)
- Most goals in a final: 9:
  - Yugal 8–1 St George Budapest (1962)
- Most goals by a losing side: 3:
  - APIA Leichhardt: Lost 3–4 against Melbourne Hungaria (1967)
- Most defeats in a final 4
  - APIA Leichhardt (1964, 1965, 1967)

==== Individual ====
- Most goals (one final): 4:
  - Tiko Jelisavčić (Yugal) (1962)
- Most goals (all finals): 4:
  - Tiko Jelisavčić (Yugal) (4 in 1962)
