= 1964 NSWSF season =

NSW Federation of Soccer Clubs
- Season: 1964

The 1964 NSW Federation of Soccer Clubs (NSWSF) season was the eighth season of soccer in New South Wales under the administration of the federation since its breakaway from the NSW Soccer Football Association in January 1957.

== NSWSF member clubs at the Australia Cup ==
The first four teams at the close of the regular season were nominated to represent the NSWSF at the Australia Cup. Representatives for the 1964 tournament were APIA Leichhardt, St George-Budapest, South Coast United and Prague. Prague and South Coast United were defeated by APIA Leichhardt and St George-Budapest respectively, with St George losing to APIA in the semi finals, and APIA Leichhardt losing to George Cross in the final.

Club	First Round	Last Round
APIA Leichhardt FC	Round of 16	Final
St George-Budapest	Round of 16	Semi-finals
South Coast United	Round of 16	
Sydney FC Prague	Round of 16	

== 1964 Australia Cup ==
=== Round of 16 ===
11 October 1964	APIA Leichhardt (New South Wales)	6–2	(New South Wales) Sydney FC Prague	Wentworth Park, Sydney
	Falconer 20', 68'; Giacometti 42', 65'; Watkiss 63'; Jaros 89'		Scheinflug 33', 65'	Attendance: 7,331

11 October 1964	St George-Budapest (New South Wales)	3–0	(New South Wales) South Coast United	Wentworth Park, Sydney
	Galambos 44'; Rodriguez 62'; Yardley 63'			Attendance: 7,331

=== Quarter-finals ===
18 October 1964	APIA Leichhardt (New South Wales)	4–2	Latrobe	Wentworth Park, Sydney
	Giacometti,, Falconer		Richards; Scott	Attendance: 6,500; Referee: Lou Stafrace

18 October 1964	St George-Budapest (New South Wales)	6–0	Adelaide Juventus	Wentworth Park, Sydney
	Galambos, Yardley, Stokes; Banicevic			Attendance: 6,500; Referee: Roger Lamb

=== Semi-finals ===
25 October 1964	APIA Leichhardt (New South Wales)	1–1 (a.e.t.)	(New South Wales) St George Budapest	Wentworth Park, Sydney
	Giacometti		Galambos	Attendance: 7,013; Referee: Keith Lockrey

==== Replay ====
28 October 1964	APIA Leichhardt (New South Wales)	4–1	(New South Wales) St George Budapest	Wentworth Park, Sydney
	Giacometti; Watkiss; Falconer; Murua		Yardley	Attendance: 5,000

=== Final ===
1 November 1964	George Cross	3–2	(New South Wales) APIA Leichhardt	Olympic Park Stadium, Melbourne
	Ackerley 3' (o.g.); Bottalico 35' (o.g.); Campbell 117'		Watkiss 15'; Jaros 44'	Attendance: 15,114; Referee: Vince Dobinson

== Leagues ==
Changes from last season:

Division	Promoted to league	Relegated from league
First Division	Corinthian BESC	None (Note: Auburn and Gladesville-Ryde merged to form Cumberland United)
Second Division	Marconi	Toongabbie

== First Division ==
First Division
- Season: 1964
- Champions: APIA Leichhardt
- Premiers: APIA Leichhardt
- Matches: 132
- Goals: 532 (4.03 per match)
- Best Player: Trevor Edwards
- Top goalscorer: John Watkiss (24)

The home and away regular season began March and ended in August after 22 rounds. APIA Leichhardt FC finished first on the ladder to become regular season premiers for the first time in its history with the federation.

The finals series was primarily held throughout September with a four-team playoff series. After two previous defeats in grand finals, regular season premiers APIA Leichhardt recorded their first championship with a 7–2 victory over Budapest in the grand final.

=== Table ===
Pos	Team	Pld	W	D	L	GF	GA	GD	Pts	Qualification or relegation
1	A.P.I.A. (C)	22	14	3	5	59	35	+24	31	Qualification for Finals series
2	St. George-Budapest	22	12	4	6	53	34	+19	28	Qualification for Finals series
3	South Coast United	22	11	6	5	39	28	+11	28	Qualification for Finals series
4	Prague	22	13	1	8	50	32	+18	27	Qualification for Finals series
5	Yugal-Ryde	22	12	3	7	49	47	+2	27	
6	Pan Hellenic	22	12	1	9	49	44	+5	25	
7	Hakoah	22	11	2	9	44	40	+4	24	
8	Cumberland United	22	9	4	9	53	40	+13	22	
9	Croatia Maroubra	22	6	6	10	36	44	−8	18	
10	Bankstown (R)	22	6	5	11	35	47	−12	17	Relegated to Second Division
11	Corinthian BESC (R)	22	3	4	15	39	62	−23	10	Relegated to Second Division
12	Canterbury-Marrickville (R)	22	3	1	18	26	79	−53	7	Relegated to Second Division

(C) Champions; (R) Relegated

=== Finals series ===
Semi-finals; 30 Aug.–6 Sep.
Major Semifinal
1	A.P.I.A.	0
2	Budapest	3
Minor Semifinal
3	South Coast	2
4	Prague	1

Preliminary final 13 Sep.
1	A.P.I.A.	2
3	South Coast	1

Grand final 20 September
2	Budapest	2
3	A.P.I.A.	7

== Second Division ==
Second Division
- Season: 1963
- Champions: Polonia-North Side
- Premiers: Polonia-North Side

The home and away regular season began in late March and ended in August after 22 rounds. Polonia-North Side finished first on the ladder to become regular season premiers.

The finals series began in September with a four-team playoff series. Premiers Polonia-North Side defeated 3rd-placed Granville AEK 1–0 in the grand final to become second division champions for the first time.

=== Table ===
Pos	Team	Pld	W	D	L	GF	GA	GD	Pts	Qualification or relegation
1	Polonia-North Side (C, P)	22	19	2	1	84	22	+62	40	Qualification for Finals series
2	Granville AEK	22	18	3	1	99	32	+67	39	Qualification for Finals series
3	Wollongong Olympic (Note: From 1964 to 1966, Balgownie amalgamated with local side Hellas to compete as Wollongong Olympic)	22	13	2	7	55	36	+19	28	Qualification for Finals series
4	Melita Eagles	22	11	5	6	46	34	+12	27	Qualification for Finals series
5	Blacktown BSK	22	11	1	10	61	55	+6	23	Withdrew at end of season
6	Sydney Austral	22	7	5	10	43	48	−5	19	
7	Concordia	22	7	4	11	45	62	−17	18	
8	Western United	22	8	2	12	42	59	−17	18	
9	Sutherland Shire	22	7	4	11	48	77	−29	18	
10	Marconi	22	6	3	13	36	56	−20	15	
11	Bankstown Thistle	22	5	4	13	49	67	−18	14	
12	Manly Warringah (R)	22	1	3	18	24	84	−60	5	Relegated to Inter Suburban Division One

(C) Champions; (P) Promoted; (R) Relegated

=== Finals series ===
Semi-finals; 1 September
Major Semifinal
1	Polonia-North Side	2
2	Granville AEK	1
Minor Semifinal
3	Wollongong Olympic	2
4	Melita Eagles	1

Preliminary final 7 September
2	Granville AEK	2
3	Wollongong Olympic	3

Grand final 14 September
1	Polonia-North Side	2
3	Wollongong Olympic	1

== See also ==
- 1964 in Australian soccer
