= List of Adelaide City FC seasons =

Adelaide City FC is a soccer club based in Adelaide, South Australia. Founded in 1946 by a community of post-war Italian immigrants, the club has become one of Australia's most decorated teams, having won the Oceania Club Championship, three national championships, three national cups, and 19 state championships.

This is a list of all seasons played by Adelaide City Football Club, from their first entry into SASFA Division Two in 1946 to their last completed season in 2022. It details the club's performance in every major competition entered.

== Seasons ==
Season	League											Federation/NSL Cup	Others
Season	Division	Pld	W	D	L	GF	GA	+/-	Pts	Position	Finals	Federation/NSL Cup	Others
1946	SASFA Division Two (2)	14	7	3	4	41	40	+1	17	1st (P)		Pelaco Cup Semi-finals	Pozza Cup Runner-up
1947	SASFA Division One (1)	21	5	3	13	30	70	–40	13	8th (R)		Pelaco Cup Quarter-finals	
1948	SASFA Division Two (2)	22	9	3	10	64	82	–18	21	6th			
1949	SASFA Division Two (2)	21	18	1	2	77	22	+55	37	1st (P)			Pozza Cup Runner-up
1950	SASFA Division One (1)	18	11	2	5	60	34	+26	24	Runner-up		Pelaco Cup Second round	
1951	SASFA Division One (1)	18	7	6	5	57	48	+9	20	6th		Pelaco Cup Runner-up	
1952	SASFA Division One (1)	18	12	5	1	45	17	+28	29	Runner-up		Pelaco Cup First round	Pozza Cup Runner-up
1953	SASFA Division One (1)	18	16	1	1	60	11	+49	33	Champions		Pelaco Cup Winner	Pozza Cup Winner
1954	SASFA Division One (1)	18	15	1	2	76	23	+53	31	Champions		Pelaco Cup Winner	Pozza Cup Semi-finals
1955	SASFA Division One (1)	18	14	2	2	65	19	+46	30	Runner-up		Advertiser Cup Winner	Pozza Cup Winner
1956	SASFA Division One (1)	18	18	0	0	94	10	+84	36	Champions		Advertiser Cup Quarter-finals	
1957	SASFA Division One (1)	18	15	3	0	80	16	+64	33	Champions		Advertiser Cup Winner	
1958	SASFA Division One (1)	18	16	2	0	70	16	+54	34	Champions		Advertiser Cup Winner	
1959	SASFA Division One (1)	18	13	3	2	63	21	+42	29	Champions		Advertiser Cup Winner	
1960	SASFA Division One (1)	18	12	6	4	55	32	+23	30	3rd		Disqualified (Note: Adelaide Juventus was disqualified after the first round for failing to play a replay after the use of illegal substitutions in the match.)	Ampol Cup Winner; Ascot Cup Semi-finals
1961	SA Soccer League (– (Note: The South Australian Soccer League was a breakaway league, and thus was not represented on the league system.))	21	14	4	3	62	24	+38	32	Runner-up		Jaxen Cup Quarter-finals	San Remo Cup Winners
1962	SASFA Division One (1)	18	11	1	6	52	26	+26	23	Runner-up			Australia Cup Third place
1963	SASF Division One (1)	18	13	3	2	42	22	+20	29	Champions		Federation Cup Winner	Australia Cup Third place Ampol Cup Group stage
1964	SASF Division One (1)	18	11	5	2	38	16	+22	27	Champions		Federation Cup Third round replay	Ampol Cup Semi-finals; Australia Cup quarter-finals
1965	SASF Division One (1)	18	10	1	7	50	25	+25	21	3rd		Federation Cup Winner	Australia Cup quarter-finals
1966	SASF Division One (1)	18	13	2	3	49	21	+28	28	Runner-up		Federation Cup Quarter-finals	Ampol Cup Runner-up; Australia Cup First round
1967	SASF Division One (1)	18	14	3	1	55	11	+44	31	Champions		Federation Cup Runner-up	Ampol Cup Winner; Australia Cup quarter-finals
1968	SASF Division One (1)	18	10	4	4	36	15	+21	24	3rd		Federation Cup Runner-up	Ampol Cup Runner-up; Australia Cup Second round
1969	SASF Division One (1)	18	10	2	6	45	24	+21	22	3rd		Federation Cup Winner	
1970	SASF Division One (1)	18	14	2	2	61	20	+41	30	Champions		Federation Cup Winner	Coca-Cola Cup Runner-up
1971	SASF Division One (1)	18	11	3	4	43	20	+23	25	Runner-up		Federation Cup Winner	Coca-Cola Cup Winner
1972	SASF Division One (1)	18	13	5	0	37	13	+24	31	Champions		Federation Cup Winner	Coca-Cola Cup Winner; Ampol Cup Runner-up
1973	SASF Division One (1)	18	12	1	5	37	12	+25	25	Runner-up		Willis Cup Winner	Coca-Cola Cup Winner; Ampol Cup Semi-finals
1974	SASF Division One (1)	18	13	2	3	36	11	+25	28	Champions		Willis Cup First round	Ampol Cup Winner; Coca Cola Cup Semi-finals
1975	SASF Division One (1)	18	13	2	3	42	11	+31	28	Runner-up		Willis Cup Semi-finals	Ampol Cup Semi-finals
1976	SASF Division One (1)	18	11	5	2	39	10	+29	27	Runner-up		Willis Cup Winner	Ampol Cup Semi-finals
1977	National Soccer League (1)	26	12	7	7	50	31	+19	31	4th		NSL Cup First round	
1978	National Soccer League (1)	26	9	6	11	38	44	–6	24	10th		NSL Cup Runner-up	
1979	National Soccer League (1)	26	13	6	7	43	27	+16	33	5th		NSL Cup Winner	
1980	National Soccer League (1)	26	13	4	9	40	27	+13	30	5th		NSL Cup Semi-finals	
1981	National Soccer League (1)	30	13	6	11	46	42	+4	32	7th		NSL Cup Semi-finals	
1982	National Soccer League (1)	30	6	12	12	36	44	–8	24	13th		NSL Cup First round	
1983	National Soccer League (1)	30	10	6	14	37	38	–1	36	11th		NSL Cup First round	
1984	National Soccer League South (1)	28	10	5	13	33	34	–1	25	7th		NSL Cup quarter-finals	
1985	National Soccer League South (1)	22	6	6	10	29	35	–6	18	9th		NSL Cup First round	
1986	National Soccer League South (1)	22	10	7	5	32	19	+13	27	3rd	Champions	NSL Cup Second round	
1987	National Soccer League (1)	24	6	10	8	29	23	+6	22	10th		NSL Cup First round	Oceania Club Championship Winner
1988	National Soccer League (1)	26	10	7	9	36	35	+1	27	6th		NSL Cup quarter-finals	
1989	National Soccer League (1)	26	10	8	8	29	24	+5	28	6th		NSL Cup Winner	
1989–90	National Soccer League (1)	26	13	8	5	39	23	+16	34	4th	Elimination Final	NSL Cup Semi-finals	
1990–91	National Soccer League (1)	26	12	9	5	40	24	+16	33	3rd	Preliminary Final	NSL Cup quarter-finals	
1991–92	National Soccer League (1)	26	10	9	7	26	23	+3	29	4th	Champions	NSL Cup Winner	
1992–93	National Soccer League (1)	26	12	5	9	37	34	+3	41	3rd	Runner-up	NSL Cup Semi-finals	
1993–94	National Soccer League (1)	26	11	8	7	48	27	+21	41	5th	Champions	NSL Cup Second round	
1994–95	National Soccer League (1)	24	16	1–3 (Note: Drawn matches after 90 minutes were decided on penalties, with 2 points for a win and 1 point for a loss.)	4	41	20	+21	69	Runner-up	Runner-up	NSL Cup Second round	
1995–96	National Soccer League (1)	33	15	9	9	65	40	+25	54	5th	Preliminary Final	NSL Cup Semi-finals	
1996–97	National Soccer League (1)	26	11	10	5	32	22	+10	43	4th	Elimination Final	NSL Cup quarter-finals	
1997–98	National Soccer League (1)	26	13	4	9	45	30	+15	43	3rd	Elimination Final		
1998–99	National Soccer League (1)	28	13	6	9	39	26	+13	45	6th	Elimination Final		
1999–2000	National Soccer League (1)	34	16	8	10	57	37	+20	56	4th	Elimination Final		
2000–01	National Soccer League (1)	28	12	7	11	54	54	0	43	7th			
2001–02	National Soccer League (1)	24	4	8	12	27	39	–12	20	12th			
2002–03	National Soccer League (1)	24	11	4	9	40	34	+6	37	5th	3rd		
2004	SASF Premier League (2)	22	7	6	9	27	41	–14	27	7th		Federation Cup First round	
2005	SASF Premier League (2)	22	15	2	5	43	26	+17	47	Runner-up	Champions	Federation Cup First round	Night Series Runner-up
2006	FFSA Super League (2)	18	10	8	0	37	13	+24	38	Champions		Federation Cup Winner	Errea Cup Winner
2007	FFSA Super League (2)	18	14	3	1	49	17	+32	45	Champions		Best Pavers Cup Winner	Errea Cup Semi-finals
2008	FFSA Super League (2)	18	12	1	5	33	17	+16	37	Premiers	Champions	Best Pavers Cup Runner-up	Best Point Cup Runner-up
2009	FFSA Super League (2)	18	8	4	6	25	17	+8	28	5th	Runner-up	Top Corner Cup Semi-finals	
2010	FFSA Super League (2)	18	10	2	6	28	27	+1	32	3rd	Champions	Federation Cup Second round	
2011	FFSA Super League (2)	18	13	4	1	46	15	+31	43	Runner-up	Runner-up	Federation Cup Third round	Carlsberg Cup Semi-finals
2012	FFSA Super League (2)	18	9	3	6	29	21	+8	30	4th	Runner-up	Coca-Cola Cup Semi-finals	Carlsberg Cup Semi-finals
2013	National Premier Leagues SA (2)	26	15	3	8	58	29	+29	48	3rd	Elimination Final	Coca-Cola Cup Winners	
2014	National Premier Leagues SA (2)	26	13	3	10	47	33	+14	42	6th	Elimination Final	Coca-Cola Cup Winners	FFA Cup quarter-finals
2015	National Premier Leagues SA (2)	26	14	4	8	69	39	+30	46	5th	Semi-finals	Federation Cup Runner-up	
2016	National Premier Leagues SA (2)	22	17	2	3	62	27	+35	53	Premiers	Runner-up	Federation Cup Second round	NPL Quarter-finals
2017	National Premier Leagues SA (2)	22	16	2	4	60	19	+41	32 (Note: Adelaide City had 18 competition points removed for the 2017 and 2018 seasons, and 6 points for the 2019 season.)	6th	Runner-up	Federation Cup Runner-up	NPL Quarter-finals
2018	National Premier Leagues SA (2)	22	14	4	4	52	19	+33	28	5th	Runner-up	Federation Cup Quarter-finals	
2019	National Premier Leagues SA (2)	22	5	9	8	29	42	–13	18	10th		Federation Cup Runner-up	
2020	National Premier Leagues SA (2)	22	8	7	7	27	23	+4	31	6th	Preliminary Final		
2021	National Premier Leagues SA (2)	22	11	8	3	40	20	+20	41	Runner-up	Champions	Federation Cup Runner-up	FFA Cup Round of 32
2022	National Premier Leagues SA (2)	22	15	6	1	55	17	+38	51	Premiers	Champions	Federation Cup Winners	Australia Cup Round of 16
2023	National Premier Leagues SA (2)	To Be Determined										Federation Cup quarter-finals	

During Adelaide City's tenure in the National Soccer League from 1977 until 2003, the club often fielded a second team in South Australian competitions, with limited success.

Season	League											Federation/NSL Cup	Others
Season	Division	Pld	W	D	L	GF	GA	+/-	Pts	Position	Finals	Federation/NSL Cup	Others
1985	SASF Division Two (3)	24	11	2	11	+9	43	34	18 (Note: Adelaide City had six competition points removed for failing to provide results or matchcards.)	10th		P.G.H. Cup First round	Ampol Cup Winner
1986	SASF Division Two (3)	20	6	6	8	24	27	–3	18	8th		P.G.H. Cup Quarter-finals	Ampol Cup Winner
1987	SASF Division Two (3)	18	12	2	4	49	17	+32	26	1st (P)		P.G.H. Cup First round	Ampol Cup Runner-up
1988	SASF Division One (2)	22	9	4	9	27	28	–1	22	6th		P.G.H. Cup Semi-finals	
1989	SASF Division One (2)	22	4	8	10	17	30	–13	16	9th		P.G.H. Cup First round	Ampol Cup Semi-finals
1990	SASF Division One (2)	22	5	11	6	20	19	+1	21	8th		P.G.H. Cup Second round	
1991	SASF Division One (2)	22	10	6	6	39	28	+11	23	5th		P.G.H. Cup Second round	
1995	SASF State League (3)	20	6	4	10	25	30	–5	22	8th			
1996	SASF State League (3)	22	3	5	14	31	55	–24	14	11th			
1997	SASF State League (3)	22	10	6	6	53	33	+20	36	5th		Mutual Community Cup Second round	
1998	SASF State League (3)	22	10	5	7	41	25	+16	35	5th		Mutual Community Cup First round	
1999	SASF State League (3)	24	17	3	4	73	29	+44	54	1st (P)	1st	West End Cup First round	
2000	SASF Premier League (2)	22	6	5	11	26	36	–10	23	10th		West End Cup Semi-finals	
2001	SASF Premier League (2)	22	11	4	7	46	26	+20	37	5th	Elimination Final	West End Cup First round	Summer Night Series Group stage
2002	SASF Premier League (2)	22	5	5	12	37	52	–15	20	10th		West End Cup Quarter-finals	Summer Night Series 4th
2003	SASF Premier League (2)	22	8	3	11	26	35	–9	27	8th		Federation Cup First round	
