= 1965 in Australian soccer =

Soccer in Australia
- Season: 1965

Men's soccer
- Australia Cup: Sydney City

The 1965 season was the fourth season of national competitive soccer in Australia and 82nd overall.

== National teams ==
=== Australia national soccer team ===
==== Results and fixtures ====
===== Friendlies =====
26 November 1965	Cambodia	0–0	Australia	Phnom-Penh, Cambodia
		Report		Stadium: Stade Olympique; Attendance: 20,000; Referee: Alng Kim Ean (Cambodia)

29 November 1965	Hong Kong	1–0	Australia	Causeway Bay, Hong Kong
	McLaren 22'	Report		Stadium: Government Stadium; Attendance: 8,780; Referee: Lee Ken-Chie (Hong Kong)

7 December 1965	Malaysia	0–1	Australia	Perak, Malaysia
		Report	Pearson 17'	Stadium: Perak Stadium; Attendance: 1,250; Referee: Boswell (Malaysia)

8 December 1965	Malaysia	0–3	Australia	Perak, Malaysia
		Report	Todd 54'; Johnston 65'; Scheinflug 84' (pen.)	Stadium: Perak Stadium; Attendance: 300

===== 1966 FIFA World Cup qualification =====
21 November 1965	North Korea	6–1	Australia	Phnom Penh, Cambodia
	Pak Doo-Ik 15'; Pak Seung-Zin 54', 80'; Im Seung-Hwi 58'; Han Bong-Zin 65', 88'	Report	Scheinflug 70' (pen.)	Stadium: Stade Olympique; Attendance: 60,000; Referee: Patrick Nice (Malaysia)

24 November 1965	Australia	1–3	North Korea	Phnom Penh, Cambodia
	Scheinflug 15'	Report	Kim Seung-Il 18', 75'; Pak Seung-Zin 53'	Stadium: Stade Olympique; Attendance: 40,000; Referee: AG de Silva (Singapore)

== Cup competitions ==
=== Australia Cup ===
The competition began on 24 October 1965 (excluding preliminary rounds). Thirteen clubs had entered the competition with the final two clubs Sydney City and APIA Leichhardt qualifying for the Final. Hakoah won a replay match 2–1, with one goal each from David Reid and Herbert Ninaus after a 1–1 draw (13–13 on penalties)

=== Final ===
21 November 1965

Sydney Hakoah	1–1 (a.e.t.)	APIA Leichhardt
Christie ?'		Garcia ?'
Penalties
	13–13

Wentworth Park, Sydney
Attendance: 5,900
Referee: Tony Boskovic (Sydney)

==== Replay ====
24 November 1965

Sydney Hakoah	2–1	APIA Leichhardt
Reid ?'; Ninaus ?'		Wong ?'

Sydney Showground, Sydney
Attendance: 3,500
Referee: Tony Boskovic (Sydney)

== Retirements ==
- 1 December 1965: Karl Jaros, former Austria and Australia international footballer.
