= Pat Hughes (footballer, born 1939) =

Scottish-born Australian soccer player

Personal information
- Date of birth: 4 June 1939
- Place of birth: Greenock, Scotland
- Date of death: October 2017 (aged 78)
- Place of death: New South Wales, Australia
- Position: Midfielder

Youth career
- Morton

Senior career*
Years	Team	Apps	(Gls)
- Morton
- Duntocher Hibernian
1960–1967	APIA Leichhardt		

International career
1965–1967	Australia	13	(0)
- * Club domestic league appearances and goals

Pat Hughes (4 June 1939 – October 2017) was a footballer who represented the Australia national soccer team from 1965 to 1967.

== Career ==
Hughes was born in Greenock, Scotland. Hughes played youth football for hometown club Morton, appearing in numerous cup games for the club. Hughes later joined Duntocher Hibernian in Scottish junior football and attracted the attention of Aston Villa, Stoke City and Celtic, the latter of whom signed Duntocher Hibernian teammate Paddy Crerand. He emigrated to Australia in 1960, joining New South Wales state league team APIA Leichhardt. Having begun his career as a forward, Hughes later became a midfielder. In 1965 he played for a Sydney XI against Torpedo Moscow and appeared in three representative matches for New South Wales. He made his full international debut for Australia in a 1966 World Cup qualifying match against North Korea in Phnom Penh, Cambodia, on 21 November 1965. Five days later he captained Australia for the first time, against Cambodia. He represented Australia thirteen times (nine times in full internationals), captaining the team on seven occasions, but missed their win at the 1967 South Vietnam Independence Cup due to work commitments. After retiring from playing, he coached at Sutherland Shire.

== Honours ==
APIA Leichhardt

- Australia Cup: 1966; runner-up 1964, 1967

Individual

- Football Australia Team of the Decade: 1963–1970
