= 1967 Australia Cup final =

- Event: 1967 Australia Cup
| Melbourne Hungaria | APIA Leichhardt |
| 4 | 3 |
- Date: 30 October 1967
- Venue: Olympic Park Stadium, Melbourne
- Referee: Vince Dobinson (Brisbane)
- Attendance: 11,815

The 1967 Australia Cup final was the sixth Australia Cup Final, the final match of the 1967 Australia Cup. It was played at the Olympic Park Stadium in Melbourne, Australia, on 30 October 1967, contested by Melbourne Hungaria and APIA Leichhardt. Hungaria won the match 4–3 after extra time, with three goals from Attila Abonyi and Frank Stoffels.

== Route to the final ==
=== Yugal ===
| Round | Opposition | Score |
|---|---|---|
| 1st | Launceston United (H) | 2–1 |
| QF | Melbourne Croatia (H) | 3–0 |
| SF | Melbourne Juventus (H) | 2–0 |
Key: (H) = Home venue; (A) = Away venue.

=== APIA Leichhardt ===
| Round | Opposition | Score |
|---|---|---|
| 1st | Canberra Juventus (H) | 7–1 |
| QF | Lake Macquarie (H) | 5–0 |
| SF | Pan Hellenic (H) | 2–1 |
Key: (H) = Home venue; (A) = Away venue.

== Match ==
=== Details ===
30 October 1967

| Melbourne Hungaria | 4–3 (a.e.t.) | APIA Leichhardt |
|---|---|---|
| Abonyi 19', 53', 95'; Stoffels 74' | | Shanks 24' (o.g.); Giacometti 69'; Watkiss 83' |

Olympic Park Stadium, Melbourne
Attendance: 11,185
Referee: Vince Dobinson (Brisbane)
