= 1966 in Australian soccer =

Soccer in Australia
- Season: 1966

Men's soccer
- Australia Cup: APIA Leichhardt

The 1966 season was the fifth season of national competitive soccer in Australia and 83rd overall.

== Cup competitions ==
=== Australia Cup ===
The competition began on 8 October 1966. Sixteen clubs had entered the competition with the final two clubs APIA Leichhardt and Sydney Hakoah qualifying for the Final. APIA Leichhardt won the Final match 2–0 with goals by Ricardo Campana and Bill Kerklaan.

=== Final ===
30 October 1966

APIA Leichhardt	2–0	Sydney Hakoah
Campana 32'; Kerklaan 61'

Wentworth Park, Sydney
Attendance: 10,200
Referee: Dave Maitland

== Retirements ==
- 4 October 1966: Steve Feher, 28, former Canberra Deakin and ACT soccer captain.
