= 1968 Australia Cup final =

- Event: 1968 Australia Cup
| Sydney Hakoah | Melbourne Hakoah |
| 6 | 1 |
- On aggregate

First leg
| Sydney Hakoah | Melbourne Hakoah |
| 3 | 0 |
- Date: 27 October 1968
- Venue: Wentworth Park, Sydney
- Referee: M. O'Malley
- Attendance: 3,402

Second leg
| Melbourne Hakoah | Sydney Hakoah |
| 1 | 3 |
- Date: 3 November 1968
- Venue: Middle Park, Melbourne
- Referee: M. O'Malley
- Attendance: 2,850

The 1968 Australia Cup final was the seventh and final Australia Cup Final, the final matches of the 1968 Australia Cup. The first leg was played at Wentworth Park in Sydney, Australia, on 27 October 1968 and the second leg was played at Middle Park in Melbourne, Australia, on 3 November 1968 contested by Sydney Hakoah and Melbourne Hakoah. Sydney won the final 6–1 on aggregate.

== Route to the final ==
=== Sydney Hakoah ===
| Round | Opposition | Score |
|---|---|---|
| 2nd | South Sydney Croatia (H) | 1–0 |
| QF | St George Budapest (H) | 2–0 |
| SF1 | Perth Azzurri (A) | 4–1 |
| SF2 | Perth Azzurri (H) | w/o |
Key: (H) = Home venue; (A) = Away venue.

=== Melbourne Hakoah ===
| Round | Opposition | Score |
|---|---|---|
| 1st | Launceston United (H) | 1–0 |
| 2nd | Melbourne Hungaria (H) | 4–2 |
| QF | Melbourne Croatia (H) | 2–0 |
| SF1 | Sydney Prague (H) | 1–1 |
| SF2 | Sydney Prague (A) | 3–2 |
Key: (H) = Home venue; (A) = Away venue.

== Matches ==
=== Details ===
==== First leg ====
27 October 1968

| Sydney Hakoah | 3–0 | Melbourne Hakoah |
|---|---|---|
| Baartz 15', 24'; Rutherford 84' |

Wentworth Park, Sydney
Attendance: 3,402
Referee: M. O'Malley

==== Second leg ====
3 November 1968

| Melbourne Hakoah | 1–3 | Sydney Hakoah |
|---|---|---|
| Thomas (?) | | Rutherford 57' (?); Baartz 89' |

Middle Park, Melbourne
Attendance: 2,850
Referee: M. O'Malley
