= 1964 in Australian soccer =

Soccer in Australia
- Season: 1964

Men's soccer
- Australia Cup: George Cross

The 1964 season was the third season of national competitive soccer in Australia and 81st overall.

== Cup competitions ==
=== Australia Cup ===
The competition began on 26 September 1964 (excluding preliminary rounds). Twenty-six clubs had entered, but seven of those withdrew so there were just nineteen actual participants. The competition with the final two clubs George Cross and APIA Leichhardt qualifying for the Final. George Cross won the match 3–2 after extra time, with one goal each from Archie Campbell and two own goals.

=== Final ===
1 November 1964

George Cross	3–2 (a.e.t.)	APIA Leichhardt
Ackerley 3' (o.g.); Bottalico 35' (o.g.); Campbell 117'		Buchanan ?'

Olympic Park Stadium, Melbourne
Attendance: 15,114
Referee: Vince Dobinson (Brisbane)
