= 1964 Australia Cup final =

- Event: 1964 Australia Cup
George Cross	APIA Leichhardt
3	2
- Date: 1 November 1964
- Venue: Olympic Park Stadium, Melbourne
- Referee: Vince Dobinson (Brisbane)
- Attendance: 15,114

The 1964 Australia Cup final was the third Australia Cup Final, the final match of the 1964 Australia Cup. It was played at Olympic Park Stadium in Melbourne, Australia, on 1 November 1964, contested by George Cross and APIA Leichhardt. George Cross won the match 3–2 after extra time, with one goal each from Archie Campbell and two own goals.

== Route to the final ==
=== George Cross ===
Round	Opposition	Score
1st	Melbourne Juventus (H)	2–0
QF	North Perth (H)	2–0
SF	Footscray JUST (H)	2–1
Key: (H) = Home venue; (A) = Away venue.

=== APIA Leichhardt ===
Round	Opposition	Score
1st	Sydney Prague (H)	6–2
QF	Latrobe (H)	2–0
SF	St George Budapest (H)	4–1
Key: (H) = Home venue; (A) = Away venue.

== Match ==
=== Details ===
1 November 1964

George Cross	3–2 (a.e.t.)	APIA Leichhardt
Ackerley 3' (o.g.); Bottalico 35' (o.g.); Campbell 117'		Buchanan (?)

Olympic Park Stadium, Melbourne
Attendance: 15,114
Referee: Vince Dobinson (Brisbane)
