= 1966 Australia Cup final =

- Event: 1966 Australia Cup
APIA Leichhardt	Sydney Hakoah
2	0
- Date: 30 October 1966
- Venue: Wentworth Park, Sydney
- Referee: David Maitland
- Attendance: 10,200

The 1966 Australia Cup final was the fifth Australia Cup Final, the final match of the 1966 Australia Cup. It was played at Wentworth Park in Sydney, Australia, on 30 October 1966, contested by APIA Leichhardt and Sydney Hakoah. APIA won the match 2–0, with one goal each from Ricardo Campana and Bill Kerklaan.

== Route to the final ==
=== APIA Leichhardt ===
Round	Opposition	Score
1st	Newcastle Austral (H)	4–0
QF	St George Budapest (H)	2–1
SF	Melbourne Hungaria (H)	3–0
Key: (H) = Home venue; (A) = Away venue.

=== Sydney Hakoah ===
Round	Opposition	Score
1st	Latrobe-Western Suburbs (H)	6–2
QF	South Coast United (H)	4–0
SF	South Melbourne Hellas (A)	3–1
Key: (H) = Home venue; (A) = Away venue.

== Match ==
=== Details ===
30 October 1966

APIA Leichhardt	2–0	Sydney Hakoah
Campana 32'; Kerklaan 61'

Wentworth Park, Sydney
Attendance: 10,200
Referee: Dave Maitland
