= 1962 Australia Cup =

Tournament details
- Country: Australia
- Dates: 2 November – 9 December 1962
- Teams: 16

Final positions
- Champions: Yugal (1st title)
- Runners-up: St George-Budapest

Tournament statistics
- Matches played: 16
- Goals scored: 67 (4.19 per match)

The 1962 Australia Cup was the first season of the Australia Cup, which was the main national association football knockout cup competition in Australia. 16 teams from around Australia entered the competition. The competition consisted of four clubs from Victoria and Sydney's competition, three from Queensland and South Australia and two from Northern New South Wales. The winner of the Australia Cup received £5,000.

The inaugural season of the Cup was won by Yugal who defeated St George Budapest 8–1 at Wentworth Park in the final. The third place playoff, between Juventus (now Brunswick Zebras from Melbourne) and Juventus (now Adelaide City), was won by the South Australian team on penalty kicks.

== Teams ==
Qualifying clubs
(New South Wales) NNSW	Adamstown Rosebud	Awaba		
(New South Wales) NSW	St George Budapest	Sydney Hakoah	APIA Leichhardt	Yugal
(Queensland) QLD	Brisbane Hellenic	Brisbane Azzurri	Oxley United	
(South Australia) SA	Adelaide Budapest	Adelaide Juventus	Adelaide Croatia	
(Victoria (state)) VIC	South Melbourne Hellas	Melbourne Juventus	Wilhelmina	Footscray JUST

== First round ==
First Round
Melbourne Juventus	3
Adelaide Croatia	1
Footscray JUST	1
Adelaide Budapest	3
South Melbourne	1
Yugal	2
Awaba	1
APIA Liechhardt	7
Brisbane Hellenic	0
Sydney Hakoah	1
Adelaide Juventus	3
Brisbane Azzurri	2
Adamstown Rosebud	0
Wilhelmina	2
St George-Budapest	5
Oxley United	2

Quarter-finals
Melbourne Juventus	1
Adelaide Budapest	0
Yugal	3
APIA Liechhardt	2
Sydney Hakoah	2
Adelaide Juventus	6
Wilhelmina	0
St George-Budapest	2

Semi-finals
Melbourne Juventus	1
Yugal	2
Adelaide Juventus	0
St George-Budapest	3

Final
Yugal	8
St George-Budapest	1
Third place play-off
Melbourne Juventus	1 (3)
Adelaide Juventus (p)	1 (4)

== First Round ==
2 November 1962	Brisbane Hellenic	0–1	Sydney Hakoah	Brisbane
		Report	Bell 19'	Stadium: Brisbane Exhibition Ground; Attendance: 1,500; Referee: Keith Urwin

2 November 1962	Adamstown Rosebud	0–2	Wilhelmina	Wallsend
		Report	Stoffels (?)	Stadium: Crystal Palace; Attendance: 3,500; Referee: Tony Boskovic

3 November 1962	Adelaide Juventus	3–2	Brisbane Azzurri	Adelaide
	Howlett 31'; Pegoraro 60'; Moriarty 70'	Report	Cleeton 30'; Robertson 68'	Stadium: Hindmarsh Stadium; Attendance: 3,000; Referee: Luigi Cadelli

4 November 1962	South Melbourne	1–2	Yugal	Melbourne
	Papadopoulos 15'	Report	Stojakovic 60' (pen.); Schwartz 74'	Stadium: Olympic Park; Attendance: 12,000; Referee: Bill Hosie

9 November 1962	Awaba	1–7	APIA Leichhardt	Wallsend
	Burgoyne 85' (pen.)	Report	Hitchcock 24' (o.g.); Giacometti 29', 84'; Morrow 52', 59', 76'; Bottalico 80'	Stadium: Crystal Palace; Attendance: 4,000; Referee: W. Vernon

10 November 1962	St George-Budapest	5–2	Oxley United	Sydney
	Galambos 18', 34'; Medina 24'; Stegbauer 43'; Vasvary 50' (pen.)	Report	Arrowsmith 35', 42'	Stadium: Sydney Athletic Field; Attendance: 2,125; Referee: R. Jones

11 November 1962	Melbourne Juventus	3–1	Adelaide Croatia	Melbourne
	Acunzo 19', 74'; Pagotto 60'	Report	Turic 79'	Stadium: Olympic Park; Attendance: 7,500; Referee: Roy Pierce

18 November 1962	Footscray JUST	1–3	Adelaide Budapest	Melbourne
	Mladenovic 14'	Report	Martin 39'; Cseri 44'; Szabo 49'	Stadium: Olympic Park; Attendance: 7,500; Referee: Frank Sbisa

== Quarter-finals ==
18 November 1962	Sydney Hakoah	2–6	Adelaide Juventus	Sydney
	Jaros 11', 46'	Report	Howlett 50'; Moriarty 65', 75', 80', 88'; Pegoraro 85'	Stadium: Wentworth Park; Attendance: 4,600; Referee: Roger Lamb

25 November 1962	Yugal	3–2	APIA Leichhardt	Sydney
	Nincevic 19'; Jelisavcic 40'; Dunaj 78'	Report	Morrow 32', 48'	Stadium: Wentworth Park; Attendance: 10,000; Referee: Luigi Cadelli

25 November 1962	Wilhelmina	0–2	St George-Budapest	Melbourne
		Report	Medina 24'; Galambos 76'	Stadium: Olympic Park; Attendance: 13,000; Referee: Bill Hosie

25 November 1962	Melbourne Juventus	1–0	Adelaide Budapest	Melbourne
	Bukkos 14'	Report		Stadium: Olympic Park; Attendance: 13,000; Referee: Tony Boskovic

== Semi-finals ==
1 December 1962	Adelaide Juventus	0–3	St George-Budapest	Adelaide
		Report	Medina 5', 82'; Krgin 29'	Stadium: Hindmarsh Stadium; Attendance: 5,000; Referee: Roger Lamb

2 December 1962	Melbourne Juventus	1–2	Yugal	Adelaide
	Acunzo 77'	Report	Nincevic 72'; Mucillo 87'	Stadium: Olympic Park; Attendance: 9,000; Referee: Bill Hosie

== Third place play-off ==
9 December 1962	Melbourne Juventus	1–1 (3–4 p)	Adelaide Juventus	Adelaide
	Barbazza (?)	Report	Moriarty (?)	Stadium: Olympic Park; Attendance: 5,500; Referee: Frank Sbisa

== Final ==
9 December 1962

Yugal	8–1	St George-Budapest
Jelisavcic (?); Schwarz (?); Nincevic (?); Pacanin (?)	Report	Buchanan (?)

Wentworth Park, Sydney
Attendance: 11,000
Referee: Bill Hosie
