= 1965 Australia Cup final =

- Event: 1965 Australia Cup
Sydney Hakoah	APIA Leichhardt
1	1
- The match ended 13–13 on penalties.
- Date: 21 November 1965
- Venue: Wentworth Park, Sydney
- Referee: Tony Boskovic (Sydney)
- Attendance: 5,900

1965 Australia Cup final replay
- Event: 1965 Australia Cup
Sydney Hakoah	APIA Leichhardt
2	1
- Date: 24 November 1965
- Venue: Sydney Showground, Sydney
- Referee: Tony Boskovic (Sydney)
- Attendance: 3,500

The 1965 Australia Cup final was the fourth Australia Cup Final, the final match of the 1965 Australia Cup. It was played at Sydney Showground in Sydney, Australia, on 24 November 1965, contested by Sydney Hakoah and APIA Leichhardt. Hakoah won a replay match 2–1, with one goal each from David Reid and Herbert Ninaus after a 1–1 draw (13–13 on penalties)

== Route to the final ==
=== Sydney Hakoah ===
Round	Opposition	Score
QF	St George Budapest (H)	4–1
SF1	George Cross (H)	4–1
SF2	George Cross (A)	2–1
Key: (H) = Home venue; (A) = Away venue.

=== APIA Leichhardt ===
Round	Opposition	Score
QF	South Coast United (H)	2–1
SF1	South Melbourne Hellas (A)	2–0
SF2	South Melbourne Hellas (H)	4–1
Key: (H) = Home venue; (A) = Away venue.

== Match ==
=== Details ===
==== Final ====
21 November 1965

Sydney Hakoah	1–1 (a.e.t.)	APIA Leichhardt
Christie (?)		Garcia (?)
Penalties
	13–13

Wentworth Park, Sydney
Attendance: 5,900
Referee: Tony Boskovic (Sydney)

==== Replay ====
24 November 1965

Sydney Hakoah	2–1	APIA Leichhardt
Reid (?); Ninaus (?)		Wong (?)

Sydney Showground, Sydney
Attendance: 3,500
Referee: Tony Boskovic (Sydney)
