= 1962 Australia Cup final =

- Event: 1962 Australia Cup
| Yugal | St George Budapest |
| 8 | 1 |
- Date: 9 December 1962
- Venue: Wentworth Park, Sydney
- Referee: G. Hosie
- Attendance: 11,014

The 1962 Australia Cup final was the first Australia Cup Final, the final match of the 1962 Australia Cup. It was played at Wentworth Park in Sydney, Australia, on 9 December 1962, contested by Yugal and St George Budapest. Yugal won the match 8–1, with four goals from Tiko Jelisavčić, two goals from Eric Schwarts and one goal each for Tony Nincevich and Slavko Pacanin.

== Route to the final ==
=== Yugal ===
| Round | Opposition | Score |
|---|---|---|
| 1st | South Melbourne Hellas (H) | 2–1 |
| QF | APIA Leichhardt (H) | 3–2 |
| SF | Melbourne Juventus (A) | 2–1 |
Key: (H) = Home venue; (A) = Away venue.

=== St George Budapest ===
| Round | Opposition | Score |
|---|---|---|
| 1st | Oxley United (H) | 5–2 |
| QF | Wilhelmina (A) | 2–0 |
| SF | Adelaide Juventus (A) | 3–0 |
Key: (H) = Home venue; (A) = Away venue.

== Match ==
=== Details ===
9 December 1962

| Yugal | 8–1 | St George Budapest |
|---|---|---|
| Jelisavcic (?); Schwartz (?); Nincevich (?); Pacanin (?) | | Buchanan (?) |

Wentworth Park, Sydney
Attendance: 11,014
Referee: G. Hosie
