= 1968 Australia Cup =

Tournament details
- Country: Australia
- Teams: 19

Final positions
- Champions: Hakoah Eastern Suburbs (2nd title)
- Runners-up: Melbourne Hakoah

Tournament statistics
- Matches played: 20

The 1968 Australia Cup was the seventh and final season of the Australia Cup, which was the main national association football knockout cup competition in Australia.

== Teams ==
Qualifying clubs
(Australian Capital Territory) ACT	Canberra Juventus					
(New South Wales) NNSW	Newcastle Austral					
(New South Wales) NSW	APIA Leichhardt	St George Budapest	South Sydney Croatia	Pan Hellenic	Sydney Hakoah	Sydney Prague
(Queensland) QLD	Latrobe-Western Suburbs					
(South Australia) SA	Adelaide Juventus	West Adelaide Hellas				
(Tasmania) TAS	Launceston United					
(Victoria (state)) VIC	Melbourne Hungaria	Melbourne Juventus	Melbourne Croatia	South Melbourne Hellas	Melbourne Hakoah	Footscray JUST
(Western Australia) WA	Perth Azzurri					

== Bracket ==
Round One
West Adelaide Hellas	1
Perth Azzurri	2
Canberra Juventus	0
South Sydney Croatia	1
Melbourne Hakoah	1
Launceston United	0

Round Two
Melbourne Juventus	2
Footscray JUST	1
South Melbourne Hellas	1
Perth Azzurri	2
St George Budapest	5
Newcastle Austral	0
Sydney Hakoah	1
South Sydney Croatia	0
Sydney Prague	6
Latrobe Western Suburbs	0
Pan Hellenic	1
APIA Leichhardt	0
Melbourne Hakoah	4
Melbourne Hungaria	0
Melbourne Croatia	3
Adelaide Juventus	1

Quarter-finals
Melbourne Juventus	1
Perth Azzurri	2
St George Budapest	0
Sydney Hakoah	2
Sydney Prague	3
Pan Hellenic	2
Melbourne Hakoah	2
Melbourne Croatia	0

Semi-finals
Perth Azzurri	1	–	–
Sydney Hakoah	4	awd.	w/o
Sydney Prague	1	2	3
Melbourne Hakoah	1	3	4

Final
Sydney Hakoah	3	3	6
Melbourne Hakoah	0	1	1

== Round One ==
29 March 1968

Melbourne Hakoah	1–0	Launceston United

Melbourne
Attendance: 2,070

15 April 1968

Canberra Juventus	0–1	South Sydney Croatia

Manuka Oval, Canberra
Attendance: 1,120

2 June 1968

West Adelaide Hellas	1–2	Perth Azzurri

Hindmarsh Stadium, Adelaide
Attendance: 3,100

== Round Two ==
31 March 1968

Sydney Prague	6–0	Latrobe-Western Suburbs

Sydney Athletic Field, Sydney
Attendance: 2,070

17 April 1968

St George Budapest	5–0	Newcastle Austral

Sydney Athletic Field, Sydney
Attendance: 800

25 April 1968

Melbourne Juventus	2–1	Footscray JUST

St Kilda Cricket Ground, Melbourne

1 May 1968

Pan Hellenic	1–0	APIA Leichhardt

Sydney Sports Ground, Sydney
Attendance: 6,414

8 May 1968

Sydney Hakoah	1–0	South Sydney Croatia

Sydney Athletic Field, Sydney
Attendance: 1,603

22 May 1968

Melbourne Croatia	3–1	Adelaide Juventus

Olympic Park Stadium, Melbourne
Attendance: 1,200

5 June 1968

South Melbourne Hellas	1–2	Perth Azzurri

Olympic Park Stadium, Melbourne

10 June 1968

Melbourne Hakoah	4–0	Melbourne Hungaria

St Kilda Cricket Ground, Melbourne

== Quarter-finals ==
22 May 1968

Sydney Hakoah	2–0	St George Budapest

Sydney Sports Ground
Attendance: 5,983

22 May 1968

Sydney Prague	3–2	Pan Hellenic

Sydney Sports Ground
Attendance: 5,983

26 September 1968

Melbourne Juventus	1–2	Perth Azzurri

Olympic Park Stadium, Melbourne
Attendance: 400

26 September 1968

Melbourne Hakoah	2–0	Melbourne Croatia

Middle Park, Melbourne

== Semi-finals ==
12 October 1968

Perth Azzurri	1–4	Sydney Hakoah

Perth
Not played

Sydney Hakoah	w/o	Perth Azzurri

Sydney Hakoah won after Perth Azzurri forfeited the second leg.

13 October 1968

Sydney Prague	1–1	Melbourne Hakoah

Wentworth Park, Sydney
Attendance: 3,762
20 October 1968

Melbourne Hakoah	3–2	Sydney Prague

Middle Park, Melbourne

Melbourne Hakoah won 4–3 on aggregate.

== Final ==
27 October 1968

Sydney Hakoah	3–0	Melbourne Hakoah
Baartz; H. Rutherford	Report

Wentworth Park, Sydney
Attendance: 3,402
3 November 1968

Melbourne Hakoah	1–3	Sydney Hakoah
Thomas	Report	Johns; W. Rutherford; Baartz

Middle Park, Melbourne
Attendance: 2,850

Sydney Hakoah won 6–1 on aggregate.
