= Billy Walsh (footballer, born 1921) =

Irish footballer and manager

Personal information
- Date of birth: 31 May 1921
- Place of birth: Dublin, Ireland
- Date of death: 28 July 2006 (aged 85)
- Place of death: Noosa, Queensland, Australia
- Position: Half back

Youth career
- Manchester United
- 1936–1938: Manchester City

Senior career*
Years	Team	Apps	(Gls)
1938–1950	Manchester City	109	(1)
	→ (wartime league)	227	(8)
1939–1940	→ Oldham Athletic (guest)	2	(1)
1941–1942	→ Rochdale (guest)	3	(0)
1942–1943	→ Manchester United (guest)	2	(0)
1951	Chelmsford City		
1951–1954	Canterbury City		
1957–1959	Eastern Suburbs		

International career
- England Schoolboys XI
1944–1948	Ireland (IFA)	6	(0)
1946–1950	Ireland (FAI)	9	(0)

Managerial career
- 1951: Chelmsford City
- 1951–1954: Canterbury City
- 1954–1955: Grimsby Town
- 19xx–19xx: Melbourne Hakoah
- 196x–19xx: Melbourne Hungaria
- * Club domestic league appearances and goals

William Walsh (31 May 1921 – 28 July 2006) was an Irish footballer. Walsh played for several clubs, but most notably with Manchester City, for whom he made more than 100 appearances. As an international, Walsh represented four national teams: after playing for the England Schoolboys XI, he then became a dual Irish international, playing for both Ireland teams – the FAI XI and the IFA XI. In 1949, he was a member of the FAI XI that defeated England 2–0 at Goodison Park, becoming the first non-United Kingdom team to beat England at home. He then emigrated to New Zealand and also played in an unofficial game for their national team. In 1960 Walsh was the selector of the Auckland FA with son, Kevin, in the side. Walsh eventually moved to Australia and settled in Noosa, Queensland. In 2003, he and several other former Manchester City players returned for the last game at Maine Road. He died on 28 July 2006 at the age of 85 and his ashes were interred at the Garden of Remembrance at the City of Manchester Stadium.

== Playing career ==
=== Early years ===
Walsh was born in Dublin, but moved to Gorton, Manchester, at the age of seven. There, he attended St Gregory's School and eventually played for the England Schoolboys XI. He later became the subject of a dispute between Manchester United and Manchester City, who both claimed he had signed for them. After being signed by a United youth coach who also coached at his school, Walsh was taken to City by his mother, where he was given a job as an office boy. The Football Association intervened and gave Walsh the choice of clubs; he chose City, but the club was also given a fine of 5 guineas.

=== Manchester City ===
Walsh subsequently signed as an amateur with for Manchester City in 1936 and then turned professional in June 1938. The Second World War delayed Walsh's full debut for City, his first appearance coming in a Wartime League game at home to Stoke City on 18 November 1939, although he played out of position at outside left. During the war, he worked as a miner and made 227 wartime league appearances for City, scoring 8 goals. He also played a further 67 Wartime Cup games. His wartime appearances became a City record. As well as playing for City, Walsh also made guest appearances for Oldham Athletic, Rochdale and Manchester United.

Walsh made his senior debut for Manchester City in the Third Round of the 1945–46 FA Cup against Barrow on 5 January 1946. The Football League did not resume until August 1946, but Walsh made his league debut on the opening day of the 1946–47 season, scoring the second goal in a 3–0 away win over Leicester City. Walsh made 13 appearances in the Second Division that season and helped City win the division title. However, he missed out on an actual medal because of his lack of games. Over the next three seasons, he established himself as a regular in the side and went on to make 118 competitive appearances, mainly as a right-half, although he would also play at left-half.

=== Later years ===
After leaving Manchester City, Walsh became a player-manager with Chelmsford City on 11 April 1951. Then in August of the same year, despite offers from Lincoln City and Port Vale to resume his playing career, he became player-manager with Canterbury City. He stayed with Canterbury until February 1954 when he was appointed manager of Grimsby Town, where he succeeded Bill Shankly.

Walsh later emigrated to New Zealand, where he came out of retirement and played for Auckland side Eastern Suburbs. On 10 August 1957, he also played for an Auckland XI in a friendly against Austria Wien. The team was captained by Ken Armstrong, a former England international while Ken Hough, an Australian who later played both football and cricket for New Zealand, played in goal. The Auckland XI beat Austria Wien 3–0. Austria Wien had previously put fourteen goals past the New Zealand national team in earlier games. Walsh would also later play one unofficial game for New Zealand against a visiting English FA XI at the age of 40.

He then moved to Australia where he worked for the Norwich Union and coached both Melbourne Hakoah and Melbourne Hungaria. In 1967, he led the latter club to a Victorian Premier League and Australian Cup double.

He worked as the soccer (football) writer for the Geelong Advertiser newspaper during the late 1970s and 1980s, leading the creation of the Geelong Advertiser Cup in 1981.

== International career ==
When Walsh began his international career in 1944 there were, in effect, two Ireland teams, chosen by two rival associations. Both associations – the Northern Ireland-based IFA and the Republic of Ireland-based FAI – claimed jurisdiction over the whole of Ireland and selected players from the whole island. As a result, several notable Irish players from this era, including Walsh, played for both teams.

=== IFA XI ===
Between 1944 and 1948 Walsh played six times for the IFA XI. On 9 September 1944 he played for the IFA XI in an 8–4 defeat against a Combined Services XI at Windsor Park. This team was basically a Great Britain XI and featured, among others, Matt Busby, Stanley Matthews, Tommy Lawton and Stan Mortensen. Walsh helped the IFA XI gain some respectable results, including a 2–0 win against Scotland on 4 October 1947, a 2–2 draw with England at Goodison Park on 5 November 1947 and a 2–0 win against Wales on 10 March 1948. He also played against England in a 6–2 defeat on 9 October 1948. He made his last appearance for the IFA XI on 17 November 1948 in a 3–2 defeat against Scotland.

=== FAI XI ===
Between 1946 and 1950 Walsh also made 9 appearances for the FAI XI, making his FAI debut in a 1–0 defeat to England on 30 September 1946 at Dalymount Park. This was the first time the FAI XI had played against England. He was also a member of the FAI XI that defeated England 2–0 at Goodison Park, becoming the first non-British team to beat England at home. Walsh made his last appearance for the FAI XI on 10 May 1950 in a 5–1 defeat to Belgium.

== Honours ==
=== Player ===
Manchester City

- Second Division champions: 1946–47

=== Manager ===
Melbourne Hungaria

- Australian Cup winners: 1967
- Victorian Premier League champions: 1967
