= Hugo Rodríguez =

Hugo Rodríguez may refer to:

- Hugo Rodríguez-Alcalá (1917–2007), Paraguayan writer and poet
- Hugo Rodríguez Chinchilla (1975–2023), Guatemalan politician
- Hugo Rodríguez Díaz (born 1957), Mexican politician
- Hugo Rodríguez (footballer, born 1959), Mexican football forward
- Hugo Rodríguez (footballer, born 1985), Mexican football defender
- Hugo Rodríguez (footballer, born 1989), Spanish football winger
- Hugo Rodríguez (footballer, born 1990), Mexican football defender
- Hugo Rodriguez (footballer, born 1991), French football midfielder
- Hugo Rodríguez González (born 1963), Chilean Air Force officer, commander-in-chief
- Hugo Rodríguez Guerrero (1937–2003), Chilean politician
- Hugo F. Rodriguez, American diplomat

== See also ==
- Hugo Rodrigues (born 1979), Portuguese footballer
