= Henry Seamonds =

1st Chairman of ASF
- In office 1961–1963
- Succeeded by: Theo Marmaras

Personal details
- Born: Henry Seamonds
- Died: 18 February 1963
- Occupation: Football administrator

Henry Seamonds was an English-born gynaecologist, who grew up in Sydney, Australia. Watching Sydney Hakoah one day, he responded to the call for a doctor when a player was injured. Asked if he would become club doctor, he declined but became involved in administration of the game, becoming chairman and treasurer of the New South Wales Federation of Soccer Clubs. He was the founding Chairman of the Australian Soccer Federation from 1961 to 1963. He died in Melbourne on 18 February 1963 after suffering a heart attack during the lunchtime adjournment of a particularly heated meeting on the issue of the readmission of Australia to FIFA.

When the Australian Soccer Federation was founded in November 1961, Theo Marmaras was elected chairman of the new body, but in a show of personal modesty, he deferred to Seamonds who had been expected to take the post. Marmaras took on the vice-chairmanship role and later acted as Chairman when Seamonds died unexpectedly. He then stepped aside for William Walkley to take over.
