= 1967 Australia Cup =

Tournament details
- Country: Australia
- Teams: 16

Final positions
- Champions: Melbourne Hungaria (1st title)
- Runners-up: APIA Leichhardt

Tournament statistics
- Matches played: 15

The 1967 Australia Cup was the sixth season of the Australia Cup, which was the main national association football knockout cup competition in Australia. Sixteen clubs from around Australia qualified to enter the competition.

== Teams ==
Qualifying clubs
(Australian Capital Territory) ACT	Canberra Juventus			
(New South Wales) NNSW	Lake Macquarie	Newcastle Austral		
(New South Wales) NSW	APIA Leichhardt	St George Budapest	South Sydney Croatia	Pan Hellenic
(Queensland) QLD	Latrobe-Western Suburbs			
(South Australia) SA	Adelaide Juventus	West Adelaide Hellas		
(Tasmania) TAS	Launceston United			
(Victoria (state)) VIC	Melbourne Hungaria	Melbourne Juventus	Melbourne Croatia	Footscray JUST
(Western Australia) WA	Perth Azzurri			

== Bracket ==
Round of 16
Melbourne Hungaria	2
Launceston United	1
West Adelaide Hellas	0
Melbourne Croatia	2
Melbourne Juventus	2
Footscray JUST	1
Adelaide Juventus	3
Perth Azzurri	0
APIA Leichhardt	7
Canberra Juventus	1
Lake Macquarie City	3
South Sydney Croatia	1
Pan Hellenic (a.e.t.)	2
St George Budapest	1
Latrobe Western Suburbs	1
Newcastle Austral	4

Quarterfinals
Melbourne Hungaria	3
Melbourne Croatia	0
Melbourne Juventus	2
Adelaide Juventus	1
APIA Leichhardt	5
Lake Macquarie City	0
Pan Hellenic	2
Newcastle Austral	1

Semifinals
Melbourne Hungaria	2
Melbourne Juventus	0
APIA Leichhardt (a.e.t.)	3
Pan Hellenic	2

Finals
Melbourne Hungaria (a.e.t.)	4
APIA Leichhardt	3

== Round of 16 ==
=== Western Division ===
7 October 1967

Melbourne Hungaria	2–1	Launceston United

Olympic Park Stadium, Melbourne
Attendance: 1,810

7 October 1967

West Adelaide Hellas	0–2	Melbourne Croatia

Hindmarsh Stadium, Adelaide
Attendance: 5,700

8 October 1967

Melbourne Juventus	2–1	Footscray JUST

Olympic Park Stadium, Melbourne
Attendance: 4,892

12 October 1967

Adelaide Juventus	3–0	Perth Azzurri

Hindmarsh Stadium, Adelaide
Attendance: 5,300

=== Eastern Division ===
8 October 1967

APIA Leichhardt	7–1	Canberra Juventus

Wentworth Park, Sydney
Attendance: 5,098

8 October 1967

Pan Hellenic	2–1 (a.e.t.)	St George-Budapest

Wentworth Park, Sydney
Attendance: 5,098

8 October 1967

Lake Macquarie	3–1	South Sydney Croatia

Lake Macquarie, Newcastle
Attendance: 4,000

8 October 1967

Latrobe-Western Suburbs	1–4	Newcastle Austral

Brisbane Exhibition Ground, Brisbane
Attendance: 2,500

== Quarter-finals ==
14 October 1967

Melbourne Juventus	2–1	Adelaide Juventus

Olympic Park Stadium, Melbourne
Attendance: 3,250

15 October 1967

Melbourne Hungaria	3–0	Melbourne Croatia

Olympic Park Stadium, Melbourne
Attendance: 3,400

15 October 1967

APIA Leichhardt	5–0	Lake Macquarie

Wentworth Park, Sydney
Attendance: 6,750

15 October 1967

Pan Hellenic	2–1	Newcastle Austral

Wentworth Park, Sydney
Attendance: 6,750

== Semi-finals ==
22 October 1967

Melbourne Hungaria	2–0	Melbourne Juventus

Olympic Park Stadium, Melbourne
Attendance: 6,021

22 October 1967

APIA Leichhardt	3–2 (a.e.t.)	Pan Hellenic

Wentworth Park, Sydney
Attendance: 8,249

== Final ==
29 October 1967

Melbourne Hungaria	4–3 (a.e.t.)	APIA Leichhardt
Abonyi 19', 53', 95'; Stoffels 74'	Report	Shanks 24' (o.g.); Giacometti 69'; Watkiss 83'

Olympic Park Stadium, Melbourne
Attendance: 11,185
Referee: Vince Dobinson (Brisbane)
