= 1966 Australia Cup =

Tournament details
- Country: Australia
- Teams: 16

Final positions
- Champions: APIA Leichhardt (1st title)
- Runners-up: Hakoah Eastern Suburbs

Tournament statistics
- Matches played: 15

The 1966 Australia Cup was the fifth season of the Australia Cup, which was the main national association football knockout cup competition in Australia. Sixteen clubs from around Australia qualified to enter the competition.

== Teams ==
Qualifying clubs
(Australian Capital Territory) ACT	Croatia Deakin			
(New South Wales) NNSW	Newcastle Austral	Adamstown Rosebud		
(New South Wales) NSW	APIA Leichhardt	Hakoah Eastern Suburbs	St George Budapest	South Coast United
(Queensland) QLD	Latrobe-Western Suburbs			
(South Australia) SA	West Adelaide Hellas	Adelaide Juventus		
(Tasmania) TAS	Olympia			
(Victoria (state)) VIC	South Melbourne Hellas	Port Melbourne Slavia	Melbourne Hungaria	Melbourne Hakoah
(Western Australia) WA	Perth Azzurri			

== Bracket ==
Round One
APIA Leichhardt	4
Newcastle Austral	0
St George Budapest	3
Croatia Deakin	1
West Adelaide Hellas	0
Melbourne Hungaria	1
Perth Azzurri (p)	1 (4)
Port Melbourne Slavia	1 (3)
South Melbourne Hellas	4
Adelaide Juventus	1
Melbourne Hakoah	6
Olympia	2
Sydney Hakoah	6
Latrobe-Western Suburbs	2
South Coast United	3
Adamstown Rosebud	2

Quarter-finals
APIA Leichhardt	2
St George Budapest	1
Melbourne Hungaria	4
Perth Azzurri	1
South Melbourne Hellas	2
Melbourne Hakoah	1
Sydney Hakoah	4
South Coast United	0

Semi-finals
APIA Leichhardt	3
Melbourne Hungaria	0
South Melbourne Hellas
Sydney Hakoah	awd.

Final
APIA Leichhardt	2
Sydney Hakoah	0

== Round 1 ==
8 October 1966

Sydney Hakoah	6–2	Latrobe-Western Suburbs

Sydney Showground, Sydney
Attendance: 1,200

9 October 1966

St George Budapest	3–1	Croatia Deakin

Wentworth Park, Sydney
Attendance: 4,500 (double header)

9 October 1966

APIA Leichhardt	4–0	Newcastle Austral

Wentworth Park, Sydney
Attendance: 4,500 (double header)

9 October 1966

South Coast United	3–2	Adamstown Rosebud

Speers Point, Newcastle
Attendance: 3,000

9 October 1966

South Melbourne Hellas	4–1	Adelaide Juventus

Olympic Park Stadium, Melbourne
Attendance: 8,850

9 October 1966

Perth Azzurri	1–1 (a.e.t.)	Port Melbourne Slavia
Penalties
	4–3

Perry Lakes Stadium, Perth
Attendance: 4,000

9 October 1966

West Adelaide Hellas	0–1	Melbourne Hungaria

Hindmarsh Stadium, Adelaide
Attendance: 6,000

9 October 1966

Melbourne Hakoah	6–2	Olympia

Olympic Park Stadium, Melbourne
Attendance: 2,300

== Quarter-finals ==
15 October 1966

Melbourne Hungaria	4–1	Perth Azzurri

Olympic Park Stadium, Melbourne
Attendance: 3,126

16 October 1966

Sydney Hakoah	4–0	South Coast United

Wentworth Park, Sydney
Attendance: 4,563 (double header)

16 October 1966

APIA Leichhardt	2–1	St George Budapest

Wentworth Park, Sydney
Attendance: 4,563 (double header)

16 October 1966

South Melbourne Hellas	2–1	Melbourne Hakoah

Olympic Park Stadium, Melbourne
Attendance: 8,221

== Semi-finals ==
23 October 1966

APIA Leichhardt	3–0	Melbourne Hungaria

Wentworth Park, Sydney
Attendance: 4,521

23 October 1966

South Melbourne Hellas	1–3	Sydney Hakoah

Olympic Park Stadium, Melbourne
Attendance: 11,500

The game was abandoned after 71 minutes due to a pitch invasion, and subsequently awarded to Sydney Hakoah.

== Final ==
30 October 1966

APIA Leichhardt	2–0	Sydney Hakoah
Ricardo Campana 32'; Bill Kerklaan 61'	Report

Wentworth Park, Sydney
Attendance: 10,200
Referee: Dave Maitland
