= Attila Abonyi =

Soccer player (1946–2023)

Atti Abonyi
Personal information
- Date of birth: 16 August 1946
- Place of birth: Budapest, Hungary
- Date of death: 6 July 2023 (aged 76)
- Height: 1.82 m (6 ft 0 in)
- Position: Winger

Senior career*
Years	Team	Apps	(Gls)
1962–1968	Melbourne Hungaria	99	(49)
1969–1976	St George-Budapest		
1977–1979	Sydney Croatia	89	(74)
1980	Melita Eagles		

International career
1967–1977	Australia	61	(25)

Managerial career
- 1978–1979: Sydney Croatia
- 1980: Melita Eagles
- 1981–1982: Riverwood
- 1983: Canberra City
- 1984: Sydney Croatia
- 1985–1986: Rockdale Ilinden
- 1987–1988: St George-Budapest
- * Club domestic league appearances and goals

Attila Abonyi (16 August 1946 – 6 July 2023) was a soccer manager and player. Born in Hungary, he played for the Australia national team.

Abonyi made his senior international debut for Australia in 1967 at the age of 20. He earned 61 caps, including appearing in the 1974 World Cup; Australia's first entry into the World Cup. In his first nine matches for Australia, he scored eleven goals all coming from the 1967 South Vietnam Independence Cup. He scored his first of three international goals against New Zealand in November 1967.

== Early life ==
Attila Abonyi was born and raised in Budapest, Hungary. He did not play regular football in Hungary, as he could not play at a junior competitive level until the age of twelve. He migrated from Budapest to Melbourne at the age of 10 after the Hungarian Revolution of 1956. He started playing for the St Kilda junior club when he turned 11 years old. He moved to his home club Melbourne Hungaria at 14, before making the senior team in 1962.

== Club career ==
Born in Hungary, he took up football after emigrating to Australia at the age of 10 in 1957. In 1962, at 15 years old, Attila played his senior debut for Melbourne Hungaria in the old Victorian State League. In 1967 Abonyi was a key player in helping the club achieve their first ever State League title. He was the top goalscorer for that season with 31 goals in 29 games, and he scored the goal that won them the title. In the same year, Abonyi was man of the match in helping Melbourne Hungaria win the Australian Cup, with a hat-trick, to defeat the favoured APIA Leichhardt 4–3 in extra-time. This turned out to be his final season with Melbourne Hungaria.

Abonyi moved to Sydney and joined St. George-Budapest between 1969 and 1976, where he was part of three New South Wales State League titles, before finishing his career with Sydney Croatia between 1977 and 1979. In June 1975, Abonyi made a guest appearance for a touring Manchester United side, coming on as a substitute for David McCreery against Queensland. He scored United's third goal in a 3–0 win.

== International career ==
Abonyi made his debut for the Australia national team in May 1967 when he played against Scotland. The national team traveled to Vietnam for a friendship tournament where he scored a hat-trick on debut against New Zealand, and then scored another hat-trick in his second match against Singapore a few days later.

Abonyi was well known for being a member of the Australian 1974 World Cup squad in West Germany and also represented New South Wales and Victoria. He scored 25 international goals for Australia in 61 games between 1967 and 1977 making him tied as the fifth highest goal scorer for Australia. He made a total of 88 appearances for Australia and scored 36 goals.

== Managerial career ==
After retiring in 1979 Abonyi switched to coaching at the state level after taking on the player-coach for the 1978 and 1979 seasons. Sydney Croatia won the minor premierships in those two years. Abonyi then moved to Melita as a coach only, where they won the minor premiership and lost the grand final. He was then offered a full-time job with Riverwood, the only full-time coaching position in the state league at the time. In his first season they finished seventh and then runners-up in 1982 on goal difference to Sydney Croatia.

Abonyi moved to Canberra in 1983 and coached Canberra City in the National Soccer League (NSL). For the 1984 season Sydney Croatia in their first season in the NSL offered Abonyi the head coach position, which he accepted (as his family had remained in Sydney). He was sacked halfway through the season because of poor results and high expectations by the board. In 1987 and 1988 he assisted Frank Arok at St. George who were in the NSL. After the 1988 season, Abonyi moved away from Sydney and football (soccer).

== Personal life and death ==
Abonyi later lived in Coffs Harbour on the north coast of New South Wales. He died on 6 July 2023, at the age of 76.

== Career statistics ==
=== Club ===
Appearances and goals by club, season and competition
Club	Season	League			Cup		Total	
Club	Season	Division	Apps	Goals	Apps	Goals	Apps	Goals
Melbourne Hungaria	1962	Victorian State League	3	0	—		3	0
Melbourne Hungaria	1963	Victorian State League	15	2	—		15	2
Melbourne Hungaria	1964	Victorian State League	19	4	—		19	4
Melbourne Hungaria	1965	Victorian State League	13	2	—		13	2
Melbourne Hungaria	1966	Victorian State League	16	10	—		16	10
Melbourne Hungaria	1967	Victorian State League	16	20	—		16	20
Melbourne Hungaria	1968	Victorian State League	17	11	—		17	11
Melbourne Hungaria	Total		99	49	–		99	49

=== International ===
Team	Year	Competitive		Friendly		Total	
Team	Year	Apps	Goals	Apps	Goals	Apps	Goals
Australia	1967	0	0	9	11	9	11
Australia	1968	0	0	0	0	0	0
Australia	1969	9	0	3	1	12	1
Australia	1970	0	0	0	0	0	0
Australia	1971	0	0	0	0	0	0
Australia	1972	0	0	5	2	5	2
Australia	1973	9	3	1	0	10	3
Australia	1974	2	0	3	0	5	0
Australia	1975	0	0	0	0	0	0
Australia	1976	0	0	7	4	7	4
Australia	1977	10	3	3	1	13	4
Career total		30	6	31	19	61	25

== Honours ==
Melbourne Hungaria

- Victorian State League Championship: 1967
- Australia Cup: 1967

St George-Budapest

- NSW State League Premiership: 1972, 1976
- NSW State League Championship: 1971, 1974, 1975

Sydney Croatia

- NSW State League Premiership: 1977, 1978, 1989
- NSW State League Championship: 1977

Abonyi Place in the Sydney suburb of Glenwood is named for him. Abonyi made a lap of honour on the MCG at half time of the 1998 World Cup qualifier against Iran.
