= Herbert Ninaus =

Austrian footballer

Personal information
- Full name: Herbert Ninaus
- Date of birth: 31 March 1937
- Place of birth: Voitsberg, Austria
- Date of death: 24 April 2015 (aged 78)
- Position: Forward

Senior career*
Years	Team	Apps	(Gls)
1954–1959	Grazer AK	98	(55)
1965	Sydney Hakoah		
1959–1961	Sydney FC Prague		

International career
1958	Austria	2	(1)
1964	Australia	2	(3)

Managerial career
- 1969: Canterbury-Marrickville FC
- * Club domestic league appearances and goals

Herbert Ninaus (31 March 1937 in Voitsberg - 24 April 2015) was an Austrian-Australian international Football player and manager.

== Career ==
Herbert Ninaus began his career at FC St. Veit, after which he, and later his brother, moved to first division side GAK. The winger soon debuted in the Austrian league in the 1954/55 season, becoming a regular player. After a strong 1957/58 season, scoring 24 goals in 25 games, Herbert Ninaus was called up for the 1958 World Cup but was not used. He was needed only a short time later, however, making his international debut against Yugoslavia on 5 October 1958 and celebrated the occasion by scoring a goal.

During the winter break in 1958/59, Ninaus decided to emigrate to Australia, where he played at Sydney Prague and was a member of their New South Wales Division One championship winning team in 1959. Later he played for Sydney Hakoah and scored the decisive goal in their 1965 Australia Cup triumph. After becoming an Australian citizen he played two B international games in 1964 for Australia against touring English team Everton F.C., scoring three goals. He also played several times for New South Wales.

After finishing his playing career, Ninaus worked as a trainer for Marrickville and Canterbury.

== Achievements ==
- New South Wales Division One champions: 1959
- Australia Cup winner: 1965
- 2 caps and 1 goal for the Austria national football team, 1958
- 2 caps and 3 goals for the Australia National Football team, 1964

== See also ==
- List of Australia international soccer players born outside Australia
