= St George-Souths FC =

St George-Souths / Hellenic
- Full name: St George-Souths Soccer Club
- Founded: 1950
- Dissolved: 1982
- Ground: Goodwin Park, Yeronga

St George-Souths was an Australian football (soccer) club formed in 1950 as the Hellenic Soccer Club by the Greek community in Brisbane, Queensland, Australia. It was a powerhouse of Brisbane soccer in the 1960s and 1970s. The club merged in 1982 with Olympic FC and were initially known as Olympic United.

== History ==
=== 1950s ===
Hellenic Soccer Club was established in early 1950 by Brisbane's Greek community and first competed in the 1950 season of Brisbane soccer, entering two teams which were placed in Divisions 4 and 5. Its first ever premiership match was in April 1950, a 6–3 loss to the Ipswich club Wattles SC in the opening round of Division 4 matches.

Hellenic remained in Division 4 in 1951 and won the premiership with a 5–1 win over Redland Bay in a premiership play-off match. As a result, the club was promoted directly to Division 2 for the 1952 season.

Hellenic remained undefeated in winning the 1952 Division 2 premiership by 8 clear points from runners-up Wattles and Merton Rovers. Hellenic was promoted to Division 1 at the end of the season, but early in 1953 the club announced it was withdrawing from Division 1 because it had insufficient players to fill a reserves team, a constitutional requirement to compete in Brisbane's top division.

Hellenic remained in Division 2 until winning the title again in 1957. The club played its first season in Division 1 in 1958. In 1959, Hellenic reached the Division 1 grand final but lost 5–4 against Annerley FC, this being the first season in which the final series was held to decide Brisbane soccer's champion club. Hellenic remained in the top flight of Brisbane soccer for 23 consecutive seasons until its final competitive season in 1980.

=== 1960s ===
In the early 1960s, with astute signings and financial backing from the Greek community, Hellenic assembled a team that was by far the most successful club in the Brisbane competition. From 1960 to 1963 the club won both the premiership and the Ampol Cup double for four consecutive seasons, and also won Division 1 Grand Finals in 1960 and 1963.

In 1961 Hellenic offered a challenge to the winner of the NSW Ampol Cup. When Sydney Prague won that competition with a 6–3 win over Hakoah The Sydney Morning Herald report asserted Prague had "re-established themselves as the No. 1 club team in Australia". The match between Hellenic and Prague to decide the Australian Soccer Club Championship (a precursor of the Australia Cup established the following year) was played as a charity event and occurred at the Sydney Sports Ground on 19 April 1961. Hellenic defeated Sydney Prague 2–1 with their prolific centre forward Socceroo Col Kitching among the goalscorers. An article on the match in The Canberra Times reported "The Brisbane team Hellenic staked its claim as Australia's top soccer side" and added that "Prague was beaten to the ball every time, and the Hellenic defence seldom allowed a scoring chance". In addition, Hellenic's style of play was described as giving Prague "a soccer lesson in passing and team combination from the start".

During the seven year life of the Australia Cup as Australia's premier club cup competition, Hellenic qualified three times. The club reached the quarter finals in 1963 after earlier round wins over Merton Rovers and Toronto Awaba. In the quarter-finals Hellenic faced Sydney Prague again as they had two years previously, but this time they went down 5–2 after holding their opponents to 1–1 at half-time. The scorers for Hellenic were Socceroos Brian Vogler and Graham McMillan. The complete quarter final line-up for Hellenic as it appeared at Wentworth Park on 13 October 1963 was:

J. Manaolotos, D. Clark, D. McKenna, J. McCarthy, L. McCrea, L. Petie, G. Kitching, B. Vogler, C. Kitching, A. Tsombaras, G. McMillan

=== 1970s ===
Hellenic won further Brisbane Division 1 premierships in 1969 and 1972, but also added two further Grand Final losses in 1972 and 1973 to give the club just two Grand Finals victories from nine Grand Finals appearances between 1959 and 1973.

The Hellenic club was re-badged as St George-Souths in 1973 to conform with the new policy of the Queensland Soccer Federation to remove ethnic names from clubs.

In the seasons leading up to the formation of the National Soccer League in 1977 Brisbane Lions and Brisbane City dominated the Brisbane competition. When these club joined the NSL St George-Souths took advantage of their absence to win another premiership, taking out the 1977 Brisbane Division One title on superior goal average after finishing level on points with Southside Eagles. St George-Souths qualified for the second edition of the new national cup competition, the NSL Cup in 1978 but were knocked out 1–0 in the first round by eventual winners Brisbane City. After finishing as Division 1 runners-up to Southside Eagles in 1978, St George-Souths qualified for the 1979 NSL Cup, but were again knocked out by Brisbane City in the first round.

=== 1980s and legacy ===
St George-Souths joined the short-lived Queensland State League that lasted from 1979 to 1982 in its inaugural season. After finishing two seasons mid-table, St George-Souths withdrew from the league due to financial difficulties and merged with Olympic FC in 1982.

== Honours ==
- Brisbane Division 1
  - Regular Season Premiers (8) – 1960, 1961, 1962, 1963, 1965, 1969, 1972, 1977
  - Regular Season Runners-up (4) – 1967, 1971, 1973, 1978
  - Champions (2) – 1960, 1963
  - Runners-up (7) – 1959, 1961, 1962, 1966, 1967, 1972, 1973
- Brisbane Division 2
  - Champions (2) – 1952, 1957
- Brisbane Division 4
  - Champions (1) – 1951
- Ampol Cup
  - Winners (6) – 1960, 1961, 1962, 1963, 1964, 1975
  - Runners-up (2) – 1972, 1974
- Australian Soccer Club Championship
  - Winners (1) – 1961
- Australia Cup
  - Quarter Finalist (1) – 1963
