= 1965 Australia Cup =

Tournament details
- Country: Australia
- Teams: 13

Final positions
- Champions: Sydney Hakoah (1st title)
- Runners-up: APIA Leichhardt

Tournament statistics
- Matches played: 15

The 1965 Australia Cup was the fourth season of the Australia Cup, which was the main national association football knockout cup competition in Australia. Thirteen clubs from around Australia qualified to enter the competition.

== Teams ==
Qualifying clubs
(Australian Capital Territory) ACT	Canberra Juventus			
(New South Wales) NNSW	Wallsend			
(New South Wales) NSW	South Coast United	St George Budapest	APIA Leichhardt	Sydney Hakoah
(Queensland) QLD	Brisbane Hellenic			
(South Australia) SA	Adelaide Juventus			
(Victoria (state)) VIC	South Melbourne Hellas	George Cross	Melbourne Juventus	Port Melbourne Slavia
(Western Australia) WA	Swan Athletic SC			

== Bracket ==
Preliminary round 1
Adelaide Juventus	4
Swan Athletic	2
St George Budapest	6
Canberra Juventus	0
Wallsend	5
Brisbane Hellenic	1

Preliminary round 2
Port Melbourne Slavia	1
Adelaide Juventus	4
St George Budapest	3
Wallsend	0

Quarter-finals
APIA Leichhardt	2
South Coast United	1
South Melbourne Hellas	1
Adelaide Juventus	0
George Cross	3
Melbourne Juventus	1
Sydney Hakoah	4
St George Budapest	1

Semi-finals
APIA Leichhardt	2	4	6
South Melbourne Hellas	2	1	3
George Cross	1	1	2
Sydney Hakoah	4	2	6

Final
APIA Leichhardt	1 (13)	1
Sydney Hakoah (replay)	1 (13)	4

== Preliminary round 1 ==
14 October 1965

St George-Budapest	6–0	Canberra Juventus

Sydney Athletic Field, Sydney
Attendance: 1,345

15 October 1965

Wallsend	5–1	Brisbane Hellenic

Crystal Palace, Wallsend
Attendance: 3,000

14 October 1965

Adelaide Juventus	4–2	Swan Athletic

Norwood Oval, Adelaide
Attendance: 5,400

== Preliminary round 2 ==
17 October 1965

St George-Budapest	3–0	Wallsend

Wentworth Park, Sydney
Attendance: 1,000

17 October 1965

Port Melbourne Slavia	1–4	Adelaide Juventus

Olympic Park Stadium, Melbourne
Attendance: 5,000

== Quarter-finals ==
24 October 1965

George Cross	3–1	Melbourne Juventus

Olympic Park Stadium, Melbourne
Attendance: 5,500

31 October 1965

Sydney Hakoah	4–1	St George-Budapest

Wentworth Park, Sydney
Attendance: 4,200 (double header)

31 October 1965

APIA Leichhardt	2–1	South Coast United

Wentworth Park, Sydney
Attendance: 4,200 (double header)

31 October 1965

South Melbourne Hellas	1–0	Adelaide Juventus

Olympic Park Stadium, Melbourne
Attendance: 10,000

== Semi-finals ==
=== First leg ===
7 November 1965

Sydney Hakoah	4–1	George Cross

Wentworth Park, Sydney
Attendance: 4,500

7 November 1965

South Melbourne Hellas	2–2	APIA Leichhardt

Olympic Park Stadium, Melbourne
Attendance: 12,000

=== Second leg ===
14 November 1965

George Cross	1–2	Sydney Hakoah

Olympic Park Stadium, Melbourne
Attendance: 7,000

Sydney Hakoah won 6–2 on aggregate.

14 November 1965

APIA Leichhardt	4–1	South Melbourne Hellas

Wentworth Park, Sydney
Attendance: 7,400

APIA Leichhardt won 6–3 on aggregate.

== Final ==
21 November 1965

APIA Leichhardt	1–1 (a.e.t.)	Sydney Hakoah
Jose Garcia	Report	Jim Christie
Penalties
	13–13

Wentworth Park, Sydney
Attendance: 5,900
Referee: Tony Boskovic

After each team had taken 15 penalties, the shootout was abandoned in favour of a replay, due to diminishing light.

=== Replay ===
24 November 1965

Sydney Hakoah	2–1	APIA Leichhardt
David Reid; Herbert Ninaus	Report	John Wong

Sydney Showground, Sydney
Attendance: 3,500
Referee: Tony Boskovic
