= 1964 Australia Cup =

Tournament details
- Country: Australia
- Teams: 19

Final positions
- Champions: George Cross (1st title)
- Runners-up: APIA Leichhardt

Tournament statistics
- Matches played: 19

The 1964 Australia Cup was the third season of the Australia Cup, which was the main national association football knockout cup competition in Australia.

== Teams ==
Qualifying clubs
(Australian Capital Territory) ACT	Canberra Juventus			
(New South Wales) NNSW	Lake Macquarie			
(New South Wales) NSW	APIA Leichhardt	St George Budapest	South Coast United	Sydney Prague
(Queensland) QLD	Latrobe	Merton Rovers	Grange Thistle	Brisbane Hellenic
(South Australia) SA	Adelaide Juventus	Adelaide Budapest	Seacliff Austria	Adelaide Croatia
(Tasmania) TAS	Rapid Hobart	Olympia	Launceston United	Ulverstone
(Victoria (state)) VIC	South Melbourne Hellas	George Cross	Footscray JUST	Melbourne Juventus
(Western Australia) WA	North Perth	East Fremantle Tricolore	Swan Valley	Perth Azzurri

== Bracket ==
Round of 16
George Cross	2
Melbourne Juventus	0
Footscray JUST	2
South Melbourne Hellas	0
Rapid Hobart	3
Launceston United	0
APIA Leichhardt	6
Sydney Prague	2
Latrobe	4
Merton Rovers	0
St George Budapest	3
South Coast United	0
Adelaide Juventus	3
Adelaide Budapest	1

Quarterfinals
George Cross	2
North Perth	0
Footscray JUST	9
Rapid Hobart	1
APIA Leichhardt	4
Latrobe	2
St George Budapest	6
Adelaide Juventus	0

Semifinals
George Cross	2
Footscray JUST	1
APIA Leichhardt (replay)	1 (4)
St George Budapest	1 (1)

Finals
George Cross (a.e.t.)	3
APIA Leichhardt	2

== Quarter-finals ==
17 October 1964

Footscray JUST	9–1	Rapid Hobart

Melbourne Showgrounds
Attendance: 2,000

18 October 1964

APIA Leichhardt	4–2	Latrobe

Wentworth Park, Sydney
Attendance: 6,500

18 October 1964

St George Budapest	6–0	Adelaide Juventus

Wentworth Park, Sydney
Attendance: 6,500

18 October 1964

George Cross	2–0	North Perth

Olympic Park Stadium, Melbourne
Attendance: 5,000

== Semi-finals ==
25 October 1964

George Cross	2–1	Footscray JUST

Olympic Park Stadium, Melbourne
Attendance: 9,000

25 October 1964

APIA Leichhardt	1–1 (a.e.t.)	St George Budapest

Wentworth Park, Sydney
Attendance: 7,013

=== Replay ===
28 October 1964

APIA Leichhardt	4–1	St George Budapest

Olympic Park Stadium, Melbourne
Attendance: 5,000

== Final ==
1 November 1964

George Cross	3–2 (a.e.t.)	APIA Leichhardt
Ackerley 3' (o.g.); Bottalico 35' (o.g.); Campbell 117'	Reports	Watkiss 15'; Jaros 44'

Olympic Park Stadium, Melbourne
Attendance: 15,114
Referee: Vince Dobinson (Brisbane)
