= Bardon Latrobe FC =

Soccer club in Brisbane, Australia

Bardon Latrobe
- Full name: Bardon Latrobe Football Club
- Nickname: 'Bardon'
- Founded: 1916 (as Latrobe Football Club)
- Ground: Bowman Park, Bardon
- Website: http://www.bardonlatrobe.org.au/
Home colours	Away colours

Bardon Latrobe Football Club, based at Bardon in Brisbane, Queensland, is one of the larger soccer clubs in Brisbane, with over 800 registered players. This iteration of the club was formed with the merging in 1970 of the Latrobe Soccer Club and the Bardon Soccer Football Club, two of the oldest clubs in the Brisbane football competition (the two clubs had previously merged for the 1941 season, as 'Latrobe-Bardon Soccer Club').

Although the local records are incomplete, the merged club, through its antecedent Latrobe Football Club (formed in 1916) appears to have had the longest continuous participation of any extant club in the Brisbane football competition. Whilst the Bardon Latrobe club's main focus since the merger has been predominantly on junior boys and girls' football, the club now has senior men's and women's teams playing in the Brisbane competition.

The club, previously known as 'Bardon Latrobe Junior Soccer Club', was officially renamed 'Bardon Latrobe Football Club' in 2014.

== Club history ==
=== 1970 merger ===
The contemporary club was originally formed as the 'Bardon Latrobe Soccer Football Club' for the 1970 season, with the merger of the Latrobe Soccer Club, then based at Gregory Park, Milton, and the Bardon Soccer Football Club, based at Bowman Park Bardon (see below). The merged club then played at Bowman Park, fielding both junior and senior teams, where it continues to play to this day. The reason for the merger is not recorded, but it is likely the two clubs did so to take advantage of their respective strengths in junior and senior football.

During the 1960s, the Bardon club had a reasonably large junior section, but its senior side was struggling and was relegated to the Third Division in 1969. Conversely, the Latrobe club had abandoned junior football in the mid-1960s and, despite winning three senior men's First Division premierships during the same period, had been relegated to the Second Division competition for season 1969. However, Latrobe won that Second Division premiership, providing the newly-merged club with promotion to the First Division for the 1970 season.

=== Senior football ===
The newly merged club played its first season in the senior First Division (then the top tier in Brisbane football) in 1970, where it finished a creditable fourth out of ten teams. A highlight of the early 1970s was when first-team coach Jim Binnie arranged a friendly match against Rale Rasic's Socceroos as a warm-up before the 1974 World Cup. The game was played at Perry Park, with the Socceroos winning 7–0.

The club continued playing in the First Division, but by 1976 was struggling financially as well as competitively. The decision was made to transfer the senior and reserve teams to the Mitchelton Football Club, where it would play the 1977 season as Bardon Latrobe, before being absorbed into the Mitchelton club. The club then decided to focus exclusively on junior football and was renamed the 'Bardon Latrobe Junior Soccer Club'. Despite this, a number of players subsequently elected to return to the Bardon Latrobe club and re-entered the Brisbane senior competition in the late 1970s as 'Bardon Latrobe Juniors', in a low division. The team won a number of premierships and regular promotion, culminating in promotion to Division 1 (the second tier of the newly re-structured Brisbane competition) in 1983, where they finished eighth out of twelve teams.

There are few available records of the senior club after this time; however, the men's senior team played in the then Brisbane Division 2 from 1985 to 1988, reaching the finals in 1988 (coached by former NSL player Gary Bromfield). In 1989, the seniors merged with the Valley Soccer club to form the Latrobe Valley club, playing in Brisbane Division 2 in 1989 and then Division 3 from 1990 to 1994, then reformed as Latrobe Athletic for the 1997 and 1998 seasons in 'Amateur' Division 1 of the Brisbane competition. After several seasons without a senior side, Bardon Latrobe re-entered the Brisbane senior competition in 2011, playing in the (amateur) Metropolitan League.

With the restructuring of the Football Brisbane competitions for season 2013, the club entered first and reserve grade teams in the newly formed men's Capital League 4 division (the fifth tier of the Brisbane competition). The club won the premiership in this division in 2015, earning promotion to Capital League 3 for season 2016. The club also entered a third men's team in the 'City League 5 Blue' competition in 2015.

Bardon Latrobe SC original badge (1970)

=== Junior football ===
Since 1971, the junior club has established a tradition of reciprocal tours with the Georges River Junior Soccer Club (Oyster Bay, New South Wales), where each year Under 12 and Under 13 teams from each club travel to compete socially against the other club.

In 2011, the club earned the 'Junior Club of the Year Award', presented by Football Brisbane and based on a range of criteria, including the performance of the teams and quality of club management.

=== Club colours ===
As noted above, the club plays in a predominantly red strip, similar to the colour of the original Latrobe club's outfit. The reason this colour was selected by Latrobe is not recorded, but it may be a reference to the original name of their home ground, the 'Red Jacket Swamp' (see 'Gregory Park' below).

== Original Bardon Soccer Football Club ==
=== The club ===
The original Bardon club was formed in the late 1920s, fielding junior teams (at that time Under 21), with few senior teams until after World War II. The senior club played as an amateur club, and remained so during its separate existence, typically playing in the second and third tiers of the Brisbane competition. As well as this, the club continued to field junior boys’ teams, but no junior girls or women's teams.

=== Beginnings ===
Bardon SFC badge (ca 1960s)

The earliest known records of a football club at Bowman Park refer to the I.O.R. Bardon (Independent Order of Rechabites) team, which played fixtures in the Brisbane Third Grade in 1920 (the local I.O.R. 'tent' (branch) had been influential in the purchase by the government and dedication of Bowman Park as a public reserve in 1916). It is not known whether the I.O.R. team ultimately became the Bardon S.F.C., as there are few known records from that era.

Anecdotal evidence has it that the Bardon S.F.C. was formed in 1926 (the year after the area was officially renamed 'Bardon' from Upper Paddington), and playing at Bowman Park. The Brisbane Courier reported in early 1926 that the "Soccer Football Association ... leased the grounds in Bowman Park". The club was certainly in existence by 1928, as the Brisbane Courier reported in March that year that it had leased Bowman Park for winter sports for £5 [five pounds – approximately AUD350 in 2010]. By the late 1920s, the club was well established, as evidenced by a newspaper report describing its end of season social at the Foresters' Hall, Paddington. The report listed the social committee as Mesdames Lansbury, Watson, Charrington, Thorpe, and Brewer and the secretary Mr M.Rowe.

Bardon S.F.C. may have been almost exclusively a junior club during those early years: it does not appear often in newspaper reports from the 1920s and 30s, and those few reports typically refer only to junior teams (at the time, 'junior' included players up to 21 years of age). The first known report of a senior team was in 1936 (see below).

=== 1930s ===
By 1931, the club featured three junior teams: First Grade, Third Grade and Third Grade B Division. A newspaper report early that year noted that "Bardons [sic] have also been strengthened and should give a better account of themselves." In 1937, the Rovers fielded a team in each of the 'Junior' Second and Third Grades. Despite not being in the top grade, one of the Bardon players, Wally Cansick, was selected for the Queensland Junior team to play New South Wales in that year. Cansick was to later play for Grange Thistle Soccer Club and for Queensland at senior level. Another player, Alf Jones, played in the Brisbane side against Ipswich in the same year. One of the State selectors at that match, William Harper, was to influence the fortunes of the Latrobe club in the 1960s (see below).

The earliest known report of a Bardon senior team was when Bardon Rovers nominated for the Third Grade in 1936 (whilst early reports referred to the club as 'Bardon', those in the mid-30s refer to the club as 'Bardon Rovers'). However, by season 1939, the club had reverted to fielding only junior teams. Curiously, a newspaper report in 1939 refers to both 'Bardon' and 'Bardon Rovers' competing in the Stewart Shield (a junior competition) at the same time on the same day (it is possible the teams were the same club, but from different grades). As well as this, a newspaper report in 1941 refers to the club being founded in 1933 by Bill Trinder. A newspaper advertisement in early 1939 also referred to the Bardon Rovers: "JUNIOR Soccer. Bardon Rovers require second grade players guernseys and socks free. Meetings Friday nights, Trinder's Boot Factory, Bardon. FO273. E. Jarvis, Secretary."

=== Club colours ===
The club played in maroon and white colours (as noted in a newspaper report in 1929) and maintained those colours until the merger with Latrobe in 1970.

== Original Latrobe Football Club ==
Latrobe SC badge (ca 1960s)

=== The club ===
The original Latrobe Football Club was one of the most successful and influential clubs in the Brisbane and Ipswich football competitions, winning nine first grade premierships between 1929 and 1967, behind only Lions FC (14 premierships between the mid-1950s and 2017) and Dinmore Bush Rats (10 premierships between the 1890s and the 1960s). Latrobe also won numerous cup and shield competitions (see the article History of association football in Brisbane, Queensland). The club is most likely named for nearby Latrobe Terrace, or the Paddington real estate subdivision the 'Latrobe Estate', carried out in the late 1870s. This subdivision occurred after the closure of the Paddington Cemetery (now the site of Suncorp Stadium) in 1875, and the creation of Given/Latrobe Terraces through that site. The street and the estate were, presumably, named for the former Lieutenant-Governor of Victoria Charles La Trobe, who died in 1875.

=== Beginnings ===
Again, there are few known existing records for the original Latrobe club, but anecdotal evidence has it that it was formed in 1916. This is supported by a newspaper report from 1933, which refers to the then Latrobe captain, Edgar Rigby, as having been "connected [with the club] since 1916". However, the Latrobe club does not appear in newspaper reports until 1917, playing in the Brisbane third grade competition with its home ground recorded as 'Milton' (the precise location of their field is not recorded, but was most likely at Gregory Park – see below). This is likely because the local competition organisers, the Queensland British Football Association, decided early in 1916 "That no competition be held in the Senior, First or Second Grade competitions and that no player of military age be allowed to take part in a lower competition ... [but] clubs ... should be allowed to play friendly matches."

It has also been suggested that the club is descended from the 'Rag-Tag Football Club', which had also played at Gregory Park from the early 1900s. However, this is unlikely, as the latter club was still playing in the Brisbane competition as late as 1918. Given the number of clubs that were formed and disbanded during the early years of Brisbane football, it is possible that Latrobe may have been formed as a breakaway club from the 'Rag-Tag' club, or from the Milton Club (formed around 1903), but there is no known connection between the Latrobe club and either of these two clubs.

Latrobe contested the third grade premiership in its inaugural season (1917), playing the final against 'Ellenas' (another Milton-based team) at Gregory Park, but losing 1–0. By 1919, the club remained in the Third Grade (but in its 'A Division') of the four-division competition.

A newspaper report in 1941 asserts that Arthur Trinder was one of the club's "foundation members" (see 'Latrobe-Bardon Soccer Club (1941)' below).

=== 1920s ===
After several years in the lower divisions, the club was finally promoted to the first grade in 1924, where it finished fifth out of six teams. The club appeared to be well established by the mid-1920s, as it featured in the Brisbane Courier with a photograph entitled "Among the metropolitan football clubs". The team was listed as R. Patterson, T. Kitson, R. Wilson, H. Gilbert, R. Whitalan, J. Carton, J. Andersley, L. Rose, A. Chittern, H. Simpson, F. Hollywood (sec. and vice-capt.), F. Hayward (pres.), R. Patterson, D. Speechley, G. Findlay, D. Lord (capt.), J. Morrisey, H. Blackmore, J. Scriven.

For season 1925, the club fared little better in the league but, despite this, acquired its first major silverware, winning the Tristram Shield (a 'knockout' competition), defeating the Thistle club 4–1 in the final. The club also won the Charity Cup, where they "outclassed" that season's Premiers, Pineapple Rovers, 5–2 in the semi-final, then defeated Dinmore Wanderers 3–1 in the final at the "Woolloongabba Cricket Ground" (now the Brisbane cricket ground), at that time the headquarters of soccer in Brisbane.

The club lost in the final of the Tristram Shield the following year (to Blackstone Rovers), but then proceeded to win this shield a further six times between 1927 and 1934.

In the ensuing years, the club climbed the ladder progressively, finishing second in 1928, then finished undefeated premiers in 1929, with a goal difference of 28 over fourteen matches. That season, the club won all of the available trophies, also including the Challenge Cup and the Tristram Shield.

The 1929 squad comprised the following players: Nixon (goalkeeper); Len Viertel and Edgar Rigby (fullbacks); Bowen, Bert Murray and Zar Korotcoff (halfbacks); E. Alexander, Bell, Jim Carton, Eric ('Hec') Gorring and Taylor (forwards). The club clearly had a very strong squad, as its players comprised over half of that season's Brisbane representative squad: Rigby (vice-captain), Murray, Korotcoff, Alexander, Carton, Viertel, Gorring and H. Ross.

=== 1930s ===
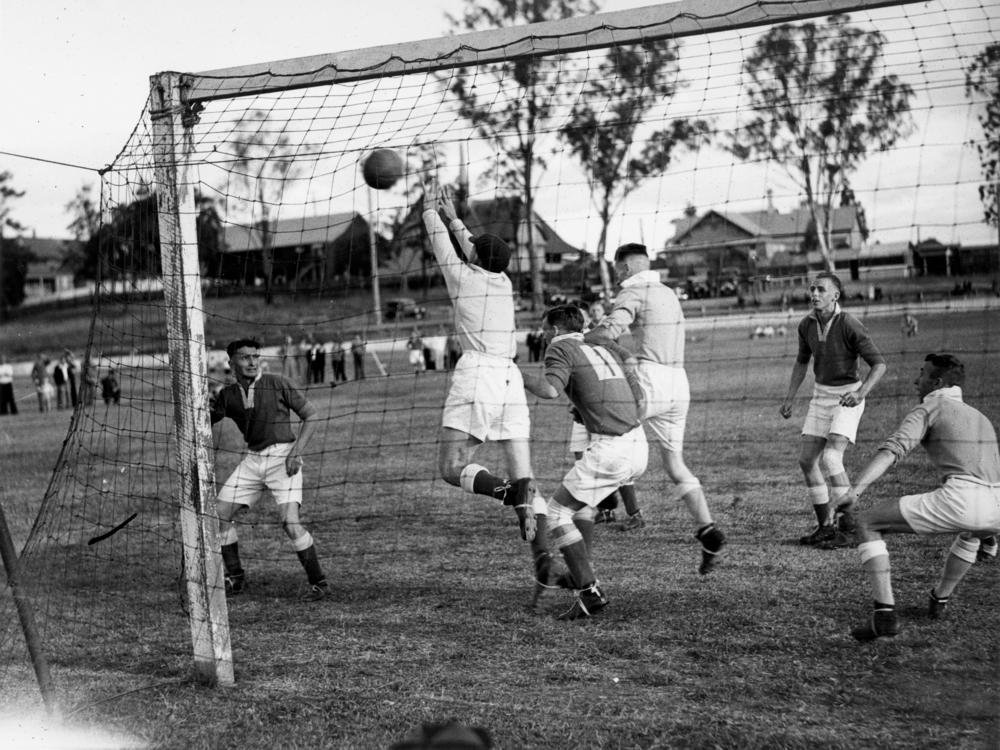
Soccer match at Lang Park Milton ca 1937 – teams not known, but likely to be Latrobe in the dark jerseys

Around 1930, the club became known as the Latrobe Soccer Club (rather than 'Football Club'), with the Brisbane Cricket Ground as its home ground. This proved to be the club's most successful period, when it won five premierships in a row (1929 to 1933) and a sixth in 1935.

In 1935 the Queensland Soccer Council (QSC) took over the lease of Lang Park as its home ground (and thus leaving the Brisbane Cricket Ground) and Latrobe became a sub-tenant, using the ground for its home games. However, by 1937, the QSC was considering sub-leasing Lang Park to "another code of football" as it "was not satisfied with the financial returns ... under the sub-lease to the Latrobe-Milton club". Latrobe in turn responded that "If no action is taken to introduce the Ipswich clubs into the Brisbane competition this season ... the Latrobe-Milton Club cannot accept an increase in rental for Lang Park. Give us competition play with Ipswich and my club will hold the ground as headquarters for the code." The matter was resolved after much negotiation between the QSC and the tenant clubs, which could explain the QSC's decision to merge the Brisbane and Ipswich associations for the 1937 season, when the Ipswich and Brisbane teams resumed competition together for the first time since 1929.

The Latrobe club returned to Gregory Park after World War II, where it remained until the merger with Bardon in 1970.

=== 1940s ===
1940 saw the formation of the Queensland Soccer Football Association (QSFA) and problems for the game: the major Ipswich clubs initially decided not to affiliate with the QSFA, as they considered it was "unconstitutional". Those clubs, with the exception of St Helens, ultimately joined the Brisbane competition for that year, after some Ipswich players joined Brisbane clubs to continue their playing careers. Latrobe boasted "four international players", including two former Bundamba players, which suggests that Latrobe (if not other clubs as well) was operating on a semi-professional basis, in order to attract players from relatively distant locations (despite this being 'illegal' under the QSFA rules at that time). A newspaper article in 1940 appears to confirm this by reporting criticism of "certain first division clubs ... [which] continued to offer inducements to [younger] players to leave the club ..." Notwithstanding Latrobe's strong squad, the Corinthians club won the Premiership that season.

For the 1941 season, Latrobe merged with Bardon to form the Latrobe-Bardon Soccer Club, but the merger lasted only one season (see Latrobe-Bardon Soccer Club (1941) below). As noted, the Brisbane competition was suspended from 1942 to 1944 and Latrobe re-entered the Brisbane senior competition in 1946. The club subsequently finished last in season 1947 and was relegated to Division 2.

=== 1950s ===
This decade was a lean period for the club, playing in Division 2 until winning the league in 1961, thus gaining promotion to the First Division for season 1962 (see also '1960s' below).

=== 1960s ===
This decade saw a revival in the club's fortunes, with their return to the top grade in 1962. This was likely as a result of the efforts of William ('Pop') Harper, who had migrated to Australia from the United Kingdom in the early 1900s, and was involved with the game in Brisbane from at least the 1930s as a selector and referee (as noted above). Harper encouraged British and Irish migrants to come to the Latrobe club from the early 1960s with offers of jobs, accommodation and semi-professional football. As a result, the team predominantly comprised overseas players during this decade, and won three first grade premierships: 1964, 1966 and 1967 (the last as 'Latrobe-Wests Soccer Club'). Despite this success, the club finished last in 1968 and was relegated to the second grade for season 1969.

Latrobe qualified for the Australia Cup five times in the 1960s with its best performance a quarter-final appearance. Former Socceroo Ray Richards played for Latrobe in the mid to late-1960s, and was a goalscorer in the club's 4–2 quarter-final loss to APIA Leichhardt in the 1964 Australia Cup.

== Latrobe-Bardon Soccer Club (1941) ==
The Latrobe and Bardon clubs had previously merged for the 1941 season, as the 'Latrobe-Bardon Soccer Club', playing senior matches at Gregory Park, Milton. Newspaper records from the time suggest that the clubs were exclusively 'senior' and 'junior' clubs respectively, so this merger may have resulted from Bardon's strong performance in junior football (under 21) in 1940, where its first grade team won the premiership and included several Brisbane and Queensland representatives (including H. Jones [sic], F. Cansick and S. Cansick (Queensland) and D. Barry).

A newspaper report in early 1941 noted "Latrobe Merge with Junior Premiers ... The amalgamation of Latrobe and Bardon, last year's first grade junior premiers, is the most important of many moves made by senior soccer clubs this season. The club will be known as Latrobe-Bardon, and four of the former Bardon players will play their first senior football against Booval at Booval to-morrow." Another newspaper report that year said "TWENTY years ago Arthur Trinder was a foundation member of the Latrobe Club, which has been five times in succession soccer premiers. His brother, Bill, formed the Bardon Club in 1933, and its junior team was undefeated in fixtures last season. Now the Latrobe and Bardon Clubs have combined, and some of last year's Bardon juniors are getting their chance in A grade. They include Alf. Jones, E. Jarvis, F. and W. Cansick, and D. Barry [it is noteworthy that the dates in this report do not appear to be accurate when compared with other public records]. However, this merger did not survive the suspension of football fixtures from 1942 to 1944 (during the war years), as Latrobe re-appeared as a stand-alone club in the 1946 senior competition.

== Latrobe Ladies Football Club ==
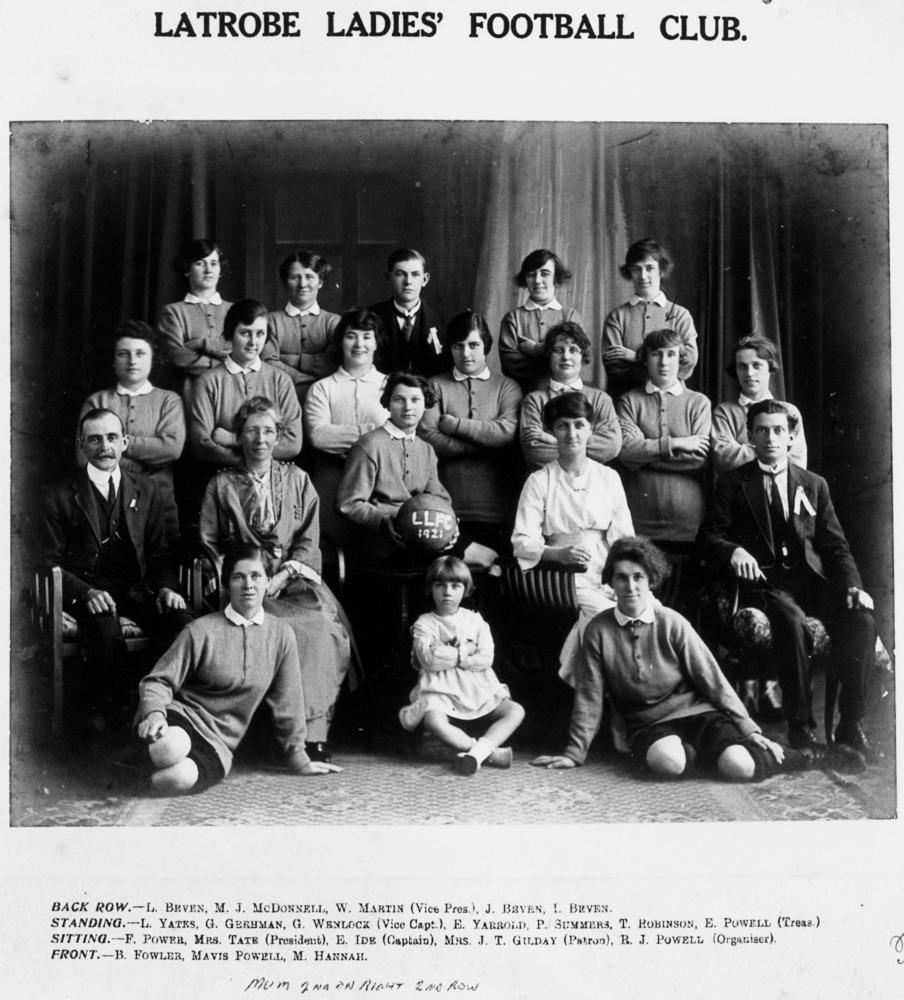
Latrobe Ladies FC 1921

The Latrobe club has the distinction of having formed one of the earliest known women's teams in Australian football history: the Latrobe Ladies’ Football Club, in 1921 (see photograph at right). The club played 'friendly' matches in the newly formed Queensland Ladies Soccer Football Association, which included two other clubs, North Brisbane and South Brisbane. Remarkably, about 10,000 spectators attended at the Brisbane Cricket Ground in late 1921 to watch a ladies' match (between North Brisbane and South Brisbane). The annual meeting of the association in 1922 expressed the desire to commence regular fixtures during the forthcoming season with "about half a dozen teams". The new season commenced in June of that year with a match at Bowman Park (see below). However, there are no known records of the progress of this association after the 1922 season.

The ladies' club patron, Mrs J.T. Gilday (pictured in the team portrait), was the wife of John Gilday Labor MLA for Ithaca, who had been active in procuring Bowman Park as a public reserve (see below).

The Bardon Latrobe club has fielded junior girl's teams for many years, and in 2012 re-entered the Brisbane senior women's competition.

== Bowman Park ==
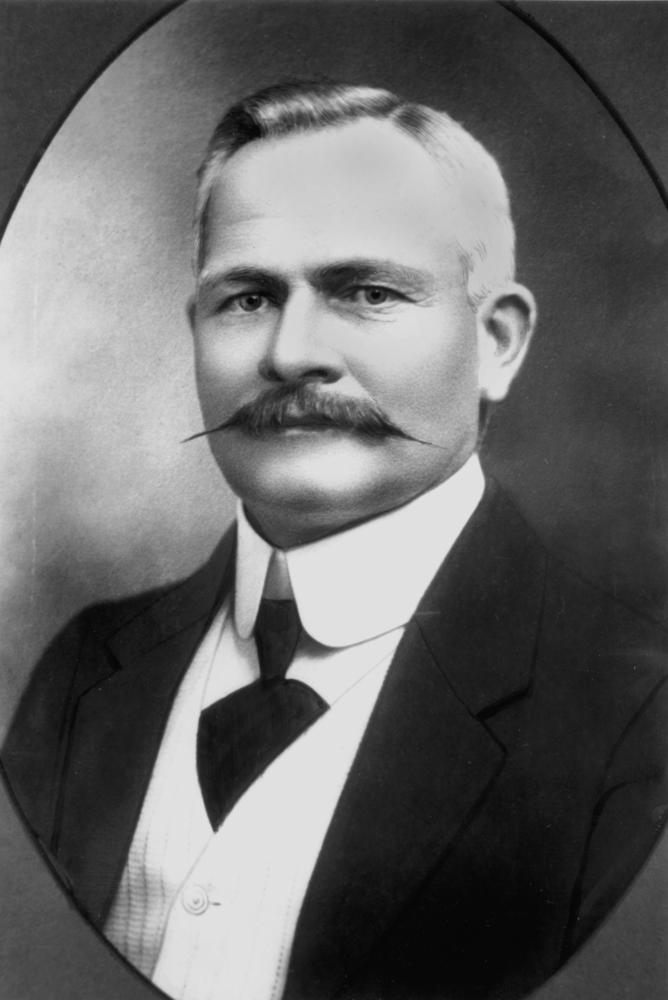
David Bowman 1860–1916

Bowman Park, home of the Bardon Latrobe club since 1970, is located at the junction of Simpsons Road, David Avenue and Bowman Parade and bounded by Ithaca Creek, Bardon.

The first land sales in this area, west of the locality then known as Upper Paddington, were held in 1862. Brisbane contractor Francis Lyon paid £76 for 38 acres (just over 15 hectares) for the lot which included the area now forming Bowman Park (referred to as a "country lot", in the Parish of Enoggera). The park area was known at the time as the 'Cobbler's Flats', because of the "superabundance of pest weed called cobblers pegs"). Another purchaser was Joshua Jeays (Brisbane Municipal Council alderman, then mayor in 1864), who purchased 39 acres adjoining and to the east of Lyon's land, at a cost of £78. Jeays built a house on his land in 1863 and named it 'Bardon', after Bardon Hill in his native Leicestershire, after which the suburb was officially named in 1925. The house still exists, and is now part of the nearby St Joseph's school campus.

A letter to the editor of the Brisbane Courier in 1911, arguing against the conversion of the Paddington Cemetery (now the site of Lang Park) to a sports ground, suggested that:

As it fortunately happens a really good opportunity now occurs to secure a splendid sports ground within a few minutes' walk of the Paddington tram terminus, and directly in the line which any future extension must take. The Bardon Estate is shortly to be cut up and sold, and the lower part of the Estate known as Cobblers' Flat can surely be secured for a reserve. A more suitable piece of land could, I think hardly be found. Of fair extent, level, and well watered. Ithaca Creek runs round it and it is already well supplied with shade trees and would require very little more than fencing to make a splendid park. It is already and has been for years a favourite location for school treats, picnics and the like There is ample space for cricket, football lacrosse, and all other healthy sports ... I therefore hope that steps will be taken to secure this land for the people before it is too late.

Another writer in the same year added "I am given to understand that the whole of this beautiful spot can be purchased for £2000 [approximately AUD140,000 in 2010]. This is an opportunity that ought not to be neglected ... Already hundreds of persons from Brisbane visit Bardon flat on holidays and Sundays."

The land was subsequently subdivided for residential development in 1915 and an area of 18 acres (approximately 7 hectares) was reserved then named 'Bowman Park' in 1916 (after David Bowman (1860–1916), former MLA for Warrego and Fortitude Valley, leader of Queensland Labor Party from 1907 to 1912, and Home Secretary in the first majority Labor Government in Queensland's history). Early transport to Upper Paddington was by horse omnibus, then electric trams that reached Macgregor Terrace in 1909. The tram service was not extended to Bowman Park until 1937, eleven years after the establishment of the original Bardon soccer club.

Bowman Park was officially opened on Saturday 23 September 1916. The Brisbane Telegraph subsequently reported:

In the presence of a gathering of about 1,000 persons the Lieutenant-Governor (Sir Arthur Morgan) as deputy for the Governor, officially opened Bowman Park, on Saturday afternoon. The park which consists of 17 1/2 acres of land, formerly known as Cobbler's Flat, Upper Paddington, for many years has been a favourite picnic ground. The Mayor [Alderman Lugg] ... stated that the park was the outcome of the activity of Upper Paddington Progress Association, in the face of some opposition. The park cost £789 15s, and the balance of the £1,000 voted for park purposes would be spent on improvements.
Sir Arthur Morgan ... heartily congratulated the people of that ward upon the success of their park movement ... The land upon which they were assembled that day was most suitable for park purposes, and especially for the holding of sports ... No doubt the greatest credit for the establishment of that park was due to the late Mr. [David] Bowman, with whom he had had the honour of being closely associated in public life, and for whose memory he had the profoundest respect, because of the late Mr. Bowman's outstanding sincerity, and his deep 'concern for the welfare of the people ... It afforded great pleasure to him to declare the park open. (Loud applause.)

Contemporaneous newspaper reports show that several soccer football clubs played at Bowman Park after this time, including Glenallen, IOR Bardon, Latrobe, Ovals, Paddington and St Barnabas. The park was also leased by the Brisbane Junior Football Association around 1920, and junior games were played there from that time. The Telegraph newspaper of 13 May 1920 reported 'Third Grade Junior' matches there, including Latrobe vs Annerley.

In 1922, the opening match of the Queensland Ladies' Football Association season was played at Bowman Park. The Brisbane Telegraph reported:

FEMININE FOOTBALLERS Femininity and football still may, be said to be only in the preliminary stages in Brisbane. There are many – if not a decided majority – who still hold up deprecatory hands. Nevertheless the first season was, last year, successfully passed through, and the second stage of the experience was entered upon last Saturday ... the first serious game of the season took place at Bowman Park, Bardon. The opposing teams were the Brisbane City Ladies and the Brisbane Ladies' Soccer Football Clubs respectively. [...] The corner of the park in which the match took place was not exactly a bowling green, and more than once a good straight kick was frustrated by a slump, But there were no accidents, and the players treated those untoward deflection's in quite a sportsmanlike way.

The City team won 12–0, with seven goals scored by their centre-forward Miss V. Molloy.

Bowman Park is also home to the West Brisbane Cricket Club, which has played there since that club's formation in 1921.

== Gregory Park ==
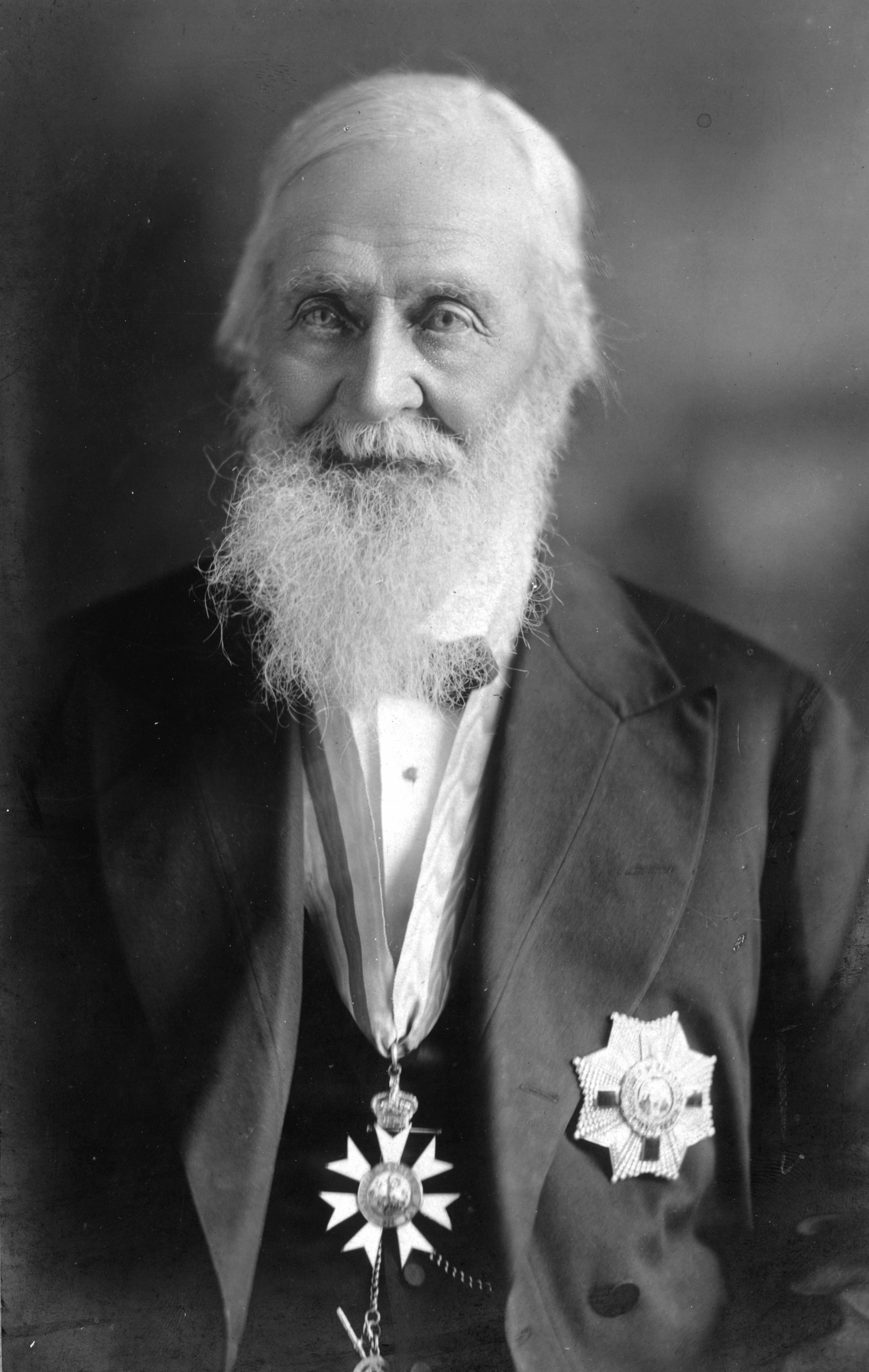
Sir Augustus Gregory

Gregory Park, former home of the Latrobe club in the 1960s, is located at the intersection of Baroona and Haig Roads, Milton, adjoining the present Milton State School (itself established on the site in 1889). The park is located on what was originally known as the 'Red Jacket Swamp', part of a string of lagoons which stretched from the then suburb of Rosalie (now part of Paddington), through the former Milton Tennis Centre to the Brisbane River. The origin of the name 'Red Jacket Swamp' is not certain – various legends had that it was named for a soldier's lost jacket, a resident bird species, or for the iron salts in the water that stained local boys' clothing a dull red colour. Another report in a 1931 newspaper noted that "[A]ccording to old residents ... the swamp received its name from a small flower-like weed that flourished in its muddy waters, during certain months of the year the leaves-no larger than a threepenny piece-would change in hue to brick red."

In 1898, the Milton school headmaster, Mr Alfred Wall, advised the local M.L.A. Mr Thomas Finney regarding the swamp that "If it was raised 2ft. 6in. or 3ft. [750–900 mm], it could be converted into a healthy place, and might be grassed over and planted with shade trees. The area would make a very pleasant park and sports ground ...". The swamp was finally drained and filled in the early 1900s, reserved as public space and named the Rosalie Recreation Reserve. The reserve became the home of the Milton Rangers Football Club around 1903 (as noted above) and the Milton Cricket Club, which celebrated the opening of its new concrete wicket in November 1906. The reserve was subsequently renamed 'Gregory Park' in late 1905, to honour Sir Augustus Gregory, Queensland's Surveyor-General from 1859 to 1879, who had died in June 1905. Gregory had been a nearby resident and had agitated for the reclamation works at the Red Jacket Swamp.

The earliest known record of the use of goal nets in Brisbane was at Gregory Park, for the opening game of the 1907 season between the Milton Football Club and Ipswich club Dinmore Bush Rats (which Dinmore won 4–1). Other soccer clubs, including 'Ellenas', 'Mallina', 'Rag-Tag' and 'Gregory Rovers' (and possibly 'Fernberg'), were also reported as playing at Milton in the early 1900s. Most of these clubs do not appear in the public records after World War I.

== See also ==
- History of soccer in Brisbane, Queensland
- Football Brisbane
- Soccer in Queensland
- Bardon, Queensland
- Joshua Jeays
