= Stan Ackerley =

Australian former footballer and coach

Personal information
- Date of birth: 12 July 1942 (age 84)
- Place of birth: Manchester, England

Youth career
- 1959–1961: Manchester United

Senior career*
Years	Team	Apps	(Gls)
1961–1962	Oldham Athletic	2	(0)
1962	Kidderminster		
1962–1963	Altrincham	17	(0)
1963	Slavia		
1964	APIA		
1964–1965	Witton Albion	4	(1)
1965–1970	APIA		
1973	Croatia		
1974–1975	Toongabbie		

International career
1965–1969	Australia	27	(0)

Managerial career
- 1974–1976: Toongabbie
- 1998–2001: Penrith Panthers
- 2002–2004: Schofields Scorpions
- * Club domestic league appearances and goals

Stan Ackerley (born 12 July 1942 in Manchester, Lancashire, England) is an Australian former footballer and coach.

== Playing career ==
=== Club career ===
Ackerley spent two seasons on the books of Manchester United from 1959 until 1961 where he played in the youth team. During the 1961–62 season he played two matches for Oldham Athletic before joining Kidderminster Harriers later in the season. In 1962 he signed for Altrincham, playing 17 matches during the 1962–63 season.

In 1963 Ackerley immigrated to Australia where he joined Slavia in the Victorian State League. The following year he moved to the NSW State League where he turned out for APIA on a $4,500 fee. Apart from a short stint back in England for Witton Albion, he played at APIA until 1970.

=== International career ===
Ackerley made his debut for Australia in their 6-1 defeat to North Korea in November 1965 in Phnom Penh. He was captain of the Socceroos in three matches, the first in a match against Japan in Melbourne in 1968. He played the last of his 27 full international matches against Israel in Sydney in December 1969.

== Coaching career ==
After retiring from football Ackerley coached a number of teams in New South Wales including Toongabbie, Penrith Panthers and Schofields Scorpions. He also spent two seasons as an assistant coach at Canterbury-Marrickville.

== See also ==
- Foreign-born footballers who played for Australia
