= Melbourne Hungaria SC =

Melbourne Hungaria
- Full name: Melbourne Hungaria Soccer Club
- Founded: 1957
- Dissolved: 1987
- Ground: JT Gray Reserve
- League: Victorian League Division 1

Melbourne Hungaria Soccer Club was an Australian association football club that was based in Melbourne, Victoria. The club was founded by Hungarian migrants in 1957 and quickly became one of the strongest football clubs in Australia in the 1960s and 1970s.

== History ==
The foundations of the Melbourne Hungaria begin with the 1956 Olympics held in Melbourne. The Hungarian Revolution of 1956 had just been crushed by the Soviet Union forces in the weeks before the Olympics, creating a politically charged atmosphere for the Hungarian Olympic team in Melbourne. Following the completion of the Olympics as many as half of the Hungarian delegation defected, many choosing to stay in Australia. This included members of the Hungarian Olympic soccer team. In 1957 these members of the Olympic soccer team founded the Melbourne Hungaria Soccer Club, which was one of many ethnic-based soccer teams founded at the time.

From 1960 to 1975 the club competed successfully in the Victorian State League, with the stand out year being 1967 under Irish coach Billy Walsh when the club won its one and only Victorian State League championship. That year the club also went on to win its biggest prize the Australian Cup, defeating Apia Leichhardt 4–3 in the Final at Olympic Park. The club's most notable player, former Socceroo Attila Abonyi, scored a hat-trick in the Final.

In 1975 the club finished bottom of the ladder and was relegated from the state League; this saw the club struggle for the next decade as they bounced between Division 1 and Division 2.

Finally in 1985 the club had its most successful season since the early 1970s as they took out the Division 1 championship to finally be promoted back to the State League. The club's second stint in the State league would be short lived as it finished in bottom spot in 1986 to drop straight back down to Division 1. The following season of 1987 proved to be the last for Melbourne Hungaria as the club struggling to stay afloat finally closed its doors after the completion of the season.

== Honours ==
- Australian Cup Winners: 1967
- Victorian Champions – 1967
- Victorian Runners-Up – 1970
- Victorian State League Top 4 Finalists – 1960, 1966, 1967, 1970, 1971, 1972
- Victorian Division 1 Champions – 1959 (South), 1985
- Victorian Division 2 Champions – 1978, 1982
- Victorian Metropolitan League South Champions: 1957
- Ampol Cup Winners – 1973
- Ampol Cup Runners-Up – 1967
