= Wentworth Park =

Park in Sydney, Australia

Wentwork Park
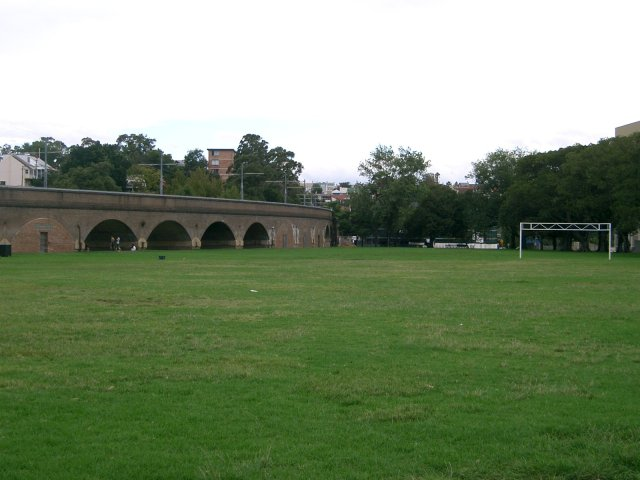
- Interactive map of Wentwork Park
- Type: Urban park and sports ground
- Coordinates: 33°52′31″S 151°11′31″E
- Created: 1882
- Opened: 1882
- Etymology: William Wentworth
- Owner: City of Sydney – NSW Government
- Administrator: Simon Spicer
- Manager: Lyn Doherty
- Operator: Wentworth Park Sporting Complex Trust
- Open: Open 24 hours
- Status: Open all year
- Designation: Partially Heritage Listed
- Parking: Carpark & Street Parking
- Public transit: Bus
- Facilities: Sports grounds, toilet and changeroom facilities.
- Website: www.gbota.com.au/wentworth-park

Wentworth Park is a park near the suburbs of Glebe and Ultimo in Sydney, New South Wales, Australia.

The park contains several multi-purpose sporting pitches, cricket nets and a number of fitness installations. There is a playground in the southern area of the park and seating for picnics. Public toilets are next to the sports field.

In the centre of the park is the Wentworth Park Sporting Complex.

In December 2025, the Government of New South Wales announced that the site will be redeveloped to provide for extra housing. The greyhound racing track closed in October 2026.

== History ==
Wentworth Park was initially a creek and swamp, known from the 1830s as Blackwattle Cove Swamp. Between the 1830s and 1860s, various toxic industries were established along the shore, including, in particular, abattoirs and boiling down works. The pollution from these works befouled the swamp so that, even after the removal of these establishments from the area, the local council lobbied to have the area in-filled because of the stench that continued to arise from the water and mud.

Infilling of the creek and head of the swamp commenced in 1876 and continued until 1880. Silt dredged from Sydney Harbour was used to carry out the process and numerous sea walls and dykes were constructed as part of the program. Trustees were appointed on 26 July 1878 by Governor Robinson to manage the new park and a competition was announced to design the new facility. After numerous complaints regarding the management of the competition, the construction commenced and by 1882 opinion had turned favourably to the new ovals, greens, paths, lakes and other facilities offered in the park, named in honour of statesman William Charles Wentworth.

Wentworth Park was formally proclaimed a public park under the Public Parks Act 1884 by Governor Loftus on 4 November 1885.

Throughout the 1880s and 1890s, the park came to serve as a focus for community activities including concerts, celebrations, moving pictures and in particular the home of Glebe Dirty Reds and sport in general. During the 1910 Great Britain Lions tour of Australia and New Zealand, an Australasian team defeated Great Britain at the ground before a crowd of approximately 15,000.

The commencement of hostilities for the First World War led to a downturn in patronage of the park's amenities although community functions, such as stretcher drills and polling were carried out here. The main effect of World War I was the introduction of a large number of timber sheds used to store wool for the war effort. These sheds lingered on at the park for a number of years after the war.

=== As a sporting venue ===
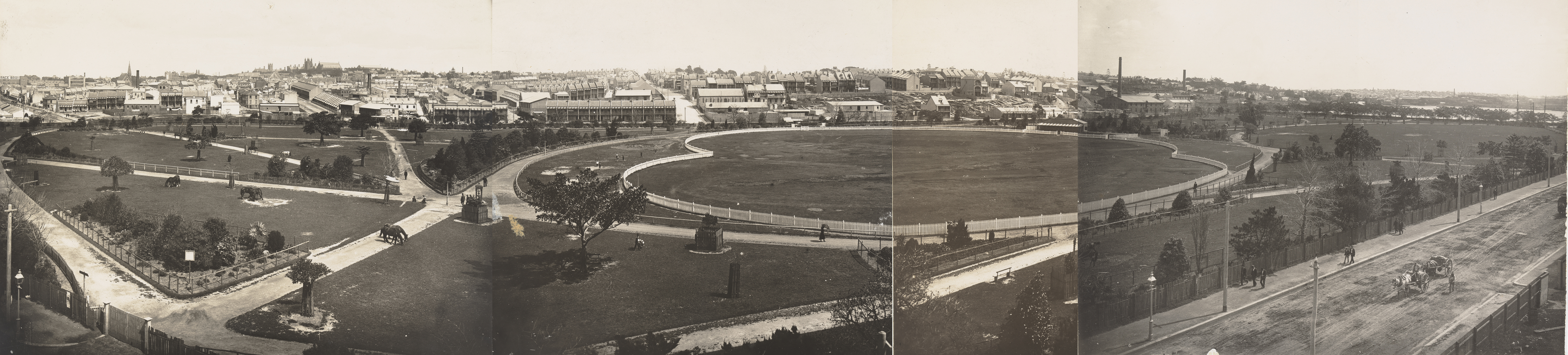
Panorama of Wentworth Park, Glebe, Sydney, c.1924

Wentworth Park was originally a rugby league sports ground in the Glebe area, the home ground of the Glebe Dirty Reds who were a part of the New South Wales Rugby League premiership at the time of the competition's inception. The ground was also home to Annandale rugby league team throughout their existence from 1910 to 1920. After the Glebe Dirty Reds were removed from the competition at the end of 1929, Balmain Tigers continued to play some of their home matches at the ground. The final game of first grade rugby league played at Wentworth Park was in Round 2, 1931 when the Balmain Tigers played against University with Balmain Tigers winning 29–14. A question over the use of league or grounds gatemen led the League to decide to use other grounds.

From 1928 until 1936, Wentworth Park was also used as a speedway and was known as Wentworth Speedway. The first racing took place on 21 April 1928 and continued until 28 November 1936. Motorcycle speedway was the first category to use the venue, with competitors including future Speedway World Champions Lionel Van Praag and Bluey Wilkinson. Wentworth Park was the site of Sydney's first ever Speedcar race on 5 October 1935. The final speedway meeting was to have taken place on 5 December 1936, but track damage and noise complaints saw the meeting cancelled.

During July 1938, the government granted a second greyhound racing licence (consisting of 26 fixtures) for Wentworth Park. Although the licence was granted in July 1938, it was not until Saturday 28 October 1939 that the new track opened. The opening had been delayed due to the construction of the track taking longer than expected.

In December 2025, the New South Wales state government announced that the greyhound racing track would close by late 2027. It closed on 16 October 2026.

== Sporting complex ==
Wentworth Park Sporting Complex
- Wentworth Park Greyhounds
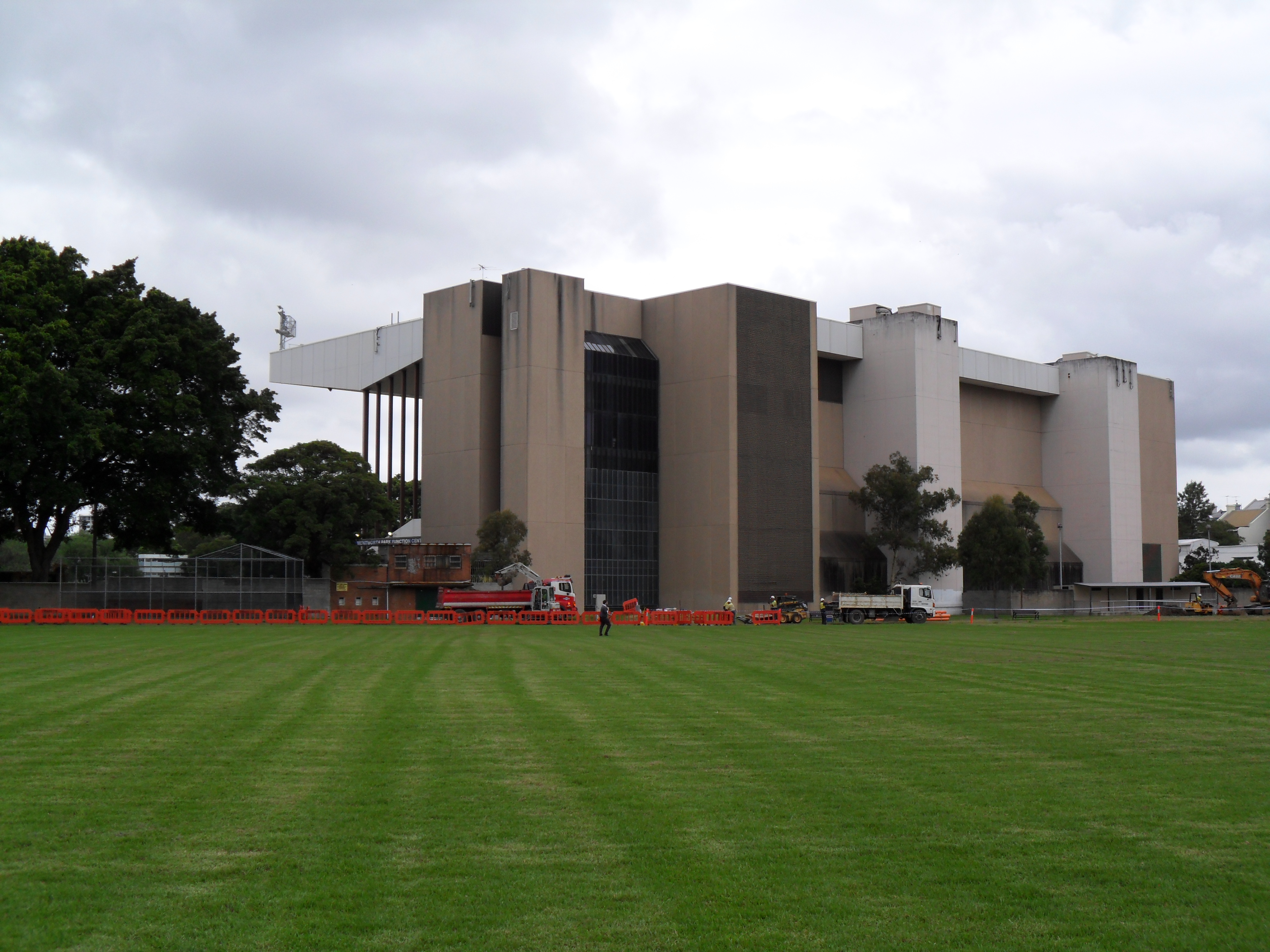
- Wentworth Park, playing fields and grandstand
- Interactive map of Wentworth Park Sporting Complex
- Former names: Wentworth Oval
- Address: Wentworth Park Rd, Glebe NSW 2037; Glebe, Sydney; Australia
- Location: Wentworth Park Road, Glebe, Sydney, New South Wales, Australia
- Coordinates: 33°52′39″S 151°11′36″E
- Owner: Wentworth Park Sporting Complex Trust
- Operator: NSW Greyhound Breeders Owners & Trainers Association (NSWGBOTA)
- Seating type: Grandstand
- Capacity: 10,000
- Surface: Grass
- Scoreboard: Yes
- Field shape: Oval

Construction
- Opened: 1932

Tenants
- Glebe Dirty Reds (NSWRL) (1908–1929), (2018–present); Annandale (NSWRL) (1910–1920); Cumberland (NSWRL) (1908); Balmain Tigers FC (NSW State League Division 1) (2013–present); NSW Greyhound Breeders Owners & Trainers Association (1932–present)

Website
- https://www.gbota.com.au/wentworth-park

Wentworth Park Sporting Complex is a multi-purpose sporting facility. Over the years, the facility has been used for various sports including soccer, rugby union, rugby league, greyhound racing, and speedway. Wentworth Park is located two kilometres (one mile) from the Sydney central business district.

Greyhound racing began at Wentworth Park in October 1932. It is conducted at Wentworth Park on Wednesday and Saturday nights as well as some special events. Greyhound races are conducted over 520 and 720 metres (1,706 and 2,362 ft). The track is a sand surface having been converted from grass in the 1990s. Hurdle racing was a feature of Wentworth Park until the early 1980s. It fell away and annual events were held in December for a number of years until the mid-1990s.

The nearby University of Technology, Sydney and other educational facilities regularly held student examinations within two levels of the grandstand. The Grandstand is also used for Trade Shows and Conferences including the Baking Association of Australia Best Pie Competition. An Antiques and Collectables Fair has been held every month since the early 2000s. It is currently run by the Collectors Mark on the third Sunday of the month. There is also a Jewellery and Deceased Estate Auction held approximately every 6 weeks.

Tenants to the Wentworth Park complex include Janison Exam Management (formerly Language Testing Consultants (LTC)), The New South Wales Greyhound Breeders, Owners and Trainers Association (NSW GBOTA), Equilibrium Climatec Joint Venture, Kane Constructions and Traino Australia.

The infield oval is used by local schools and charity groups as well other community sporting groups for sporting events.

Since the 1980s, The New South Wales Greyhound Owners Breeders and Trainers Association (NSW GBOTA) has been the primary license holder of Wentworth Park (previously sharing with the now defunct NSW National Coursing Association Club). Greyhound racing is held at the venue every Thursday and Saturday nights from 7.00pm. The biggest event of the year at Wentworth Park is the TAB Million Dollar Chase with the winner of the race going home with $A1,000,000. The event also has a strong focus on the welfare side of the industry, with 100% of all entry fees donated to the GRNSW charity, Greyhounds as Pets, to help with re-homing of greyhounds after their racing careers. The other major event is the Group 1 Golden Easter Egg which provides prize money of A$1,000,000 across the Easter carnival. The Carnival attracts approximately 2,500 racegoers. The final night is held annually on Easter Saturday.

On 5 January 2018, it was announced that the Glebe Dirty Reds would return to Wentworth Park to play pre-season games which would be the first time that rugby league has been played there in 90 years. The matches also featured Newtown and the Blacktown Workers Sea Eagles. On 17 February 2019, the Glebe Dirty Reds played in a pre-season trial game against the North Sydney Bears at Wentworth Park; and won, 24–12. This was the first time the two clubs had met since 1929. The day also featured two other matches with Newtown playing against the North Sydney Intrust Super Premiership NSW side and Ryde-Eastwood against Sydney University rugby league team. In 2023, it was announced that Glebe would be returning to Wentworth Park on a permanent basis and would be using the ground for all home matches. Currently the ground is used by not only the Glebe Dirty Reds but also the Sydney Roosters for the Knock on Effect NSW Cup and Jersey Flegg matches.

== See also ==
- Glebe and Wentworth Park railway viaducts
- List of parks in Sydney
