= List of Canterbury Bankstown FC seasons =

Canterbury Bankstown FC is an Australian association football club based in Bankstown, Sydney. The club was formed in 1886 originally as Canterbury FC. They became an inaugural member of the NSW Federation of Soccer Clubs when it broke away from the New South Wales Soccer Football Association and played in its first league season in 1957. The club won the inaugural Federation Cup and were premiers of the regular season, losing the grand final to Auburn. The club predominantly played in the top tier of soccer in Australia until the formation of the National Soccer League in 1977 where it would play in NSW First Division instead.

The club would play at national level on one occasion in 1986.

In total, Canterbury Bankstown have won two NSW Tier 1 premierships (1957 and 1985) and two championships (1958 and 1960). It has also won two Waratah Cups in 1957 and 1958) as well as two other lower division honours.

== Key ==
Key to league competitions:

- NSL = National Soccer League — National Tier 1
- NSW Div. 1 = NSW First Division — National Tier 1 (defacto) or NSW Tier 1 (Note: In 2007, NSW Div. 1 was a NSW Tier 3 tournament)
- NSW State / NSWPL / NPL NSW = National Premier Leagues NSW — NSW Tier 1
- NSW Div. 2 / NSWSL / NPL NSW 2 / NSW League 1 = NSW League One — NSW Tier 2
- NSW League 2 = NSW League Two — NSW Tier 3
- ^{P} Draws went to penalty shoot-outs during the 1990–1995 seasons (2 points for win, 1 point for loss).
- ^{1} Stage 1 of 1996 NSW Super League
- ^{2} Stage 1 of 1996 NSW Super League

Key to position colours and symbols:

1st or W	Winners
2nd or RU	Runners-up
3rd	Third
♦	Top scorer in division

Key to cup competitions:

- AMP = Ampol Cup
- NPLF = National Premier Leagues Finals

Key to cup and finals results:

- 1R, 2R, 3R...7R = 1st Round, 2nd Round, 3rd Round...7th Round
- GS = Group Stage
- EF = Elimination Final
- PF = Preliminary Final
- PO = Playoff Final
- R32 = Round of 32
- R16 = Round of 16
- QF = Quarterfinals
- SF = Semifinals
- RU = Runners-Up
- W = Winners
- Unk = Result unknown

== Seasons ==
Results of league and cup competitions by season
Season	League										State Cup (Note: Between 1972 and 1976, the State Cup was a combined tournament with teams from National Premier Leagues Northern NSW. With the introduction of the FFA Cup in 2014, the Waratah Cup served as preliminary rounds. Where results separate, Canterbury qualified for the latter stages of both tournaments. Note: In 2021 the entirety of FFA Cup was played, however the Waratah Cup finals rounds were cancelled.)	Australia Cup (Note: FFA Cup/Australia Cup (from 2014). Includes Australia Cup (1962–1968) and NSL Cup (1977–1997))	Other	Top scorer	
Season	Div (#)	P	W	D	L	F	A	Pts	Pos	Finals	State Cup	Australia Cup	Other	Player(s)	Goals
1957	NSW Div. 1 (1)	20	14	4	2	76	30	30	1st	RU	W	Not Held	SF^{AMP}		
1958	NSW Div. 1 (1)	22	14	3	5	66	31	31	2nd	W	W	Not Held	W^{AMP}		
1959	NSW Div. 1 (1)	26	13	10	3	56	45	29	5th	–	3rd	Not Held			
1960	NSW Div. 1 (1)	26	18	2	6	79	48	38	3rd	W	RU	Not Held			
1961	NSW Div. 1 (1)	22	13	5	4	51	27	31	2nd	RU	RU	Not Held			
1962	NSW Div. 1 (1)	22	4	5	13	44	55	13	11th	–	RU	DNQ			
1963	NSW Div. 1 (1)	22	7	6	9	37	45	20	7th	–	SF	DNQ			
1964	NSW Div. 1 (1)	22	3	1	18	26	79	7	12th ↓	–	3R	DNQ			
1965	NSW Div. 2 (2)	22	14	7	1	61	22	35	3rd	PF	3R	DNQ			
1966	NSW Div. 2 (2)	16	14	1	3	53	28	29	2nd	RU	QF	DNQ	?^{AMP}		
1967	NSW Div. 1 (1)	22	9	4	9	37	45	22	6th	–	Not Held	DNQ			
1968	NSW Div. 1 (1)	22	6	5	11	31	54	17	9th	–	Not Held	DNQ			
1969	NSW Div. 1 (1)	22	8	6	8	24	33	22	5th	–	Not Held	Not Held			
1970	NSW Div. 1 (1)	22	4	8	10	23	39	16	10th	–	Not Held	Not Held			
1971	NSW Div. 1 (1)	22	2	5	15	23	54	5	12th ↓	—	4R	Not Held			
1972	NSW Div. 2 (2)	22	13	4	5	55	22	30	2nd	N/A	?DNP	Not Held	?^{AMP}		
1973	NSW Div. 2 (2)	22	16	3	3	61	22	35	1st ↑	N/A	Not Held	Not Held			
1974	NSW Div. 1 (1)	22	4	6	12	25	56	14	12th ↓	–	7R	Not Held	?^{AMP}		
1975	NSW Div. 2 (2)	22	7	5	10	42	37	19	7th	–	7R	Not Held			
1976	NSW Div. 2 (2)	22	12	4	6	55	35	28	4th ↑	N/A	7R	Not Held			
1977 (Note: Introduction of National Soccer League)	NSW Div. 1 (2)	22	6	2	14	28	46	14	11th	–	Not Held	DNQ			
1978	NSW Div. 1 (2)	26	11	3	12	33	38	25	8th	–	Not Held	DNQ			
1979	NSW State (2)	26	8	8	10	33	35	24	8th	–	Not Held	DNQ			
1980	NSW State (2)	26	13	5	8	38	33	31	4th	PF	Not Held	DNQ			
1981	NSW State (2)	30	6	8	12	34	50	20	9th	–	Not Held	1R			
1982	NSW State (2)	30	11	6	9	42	43	28	7th	–	Not Held	DNQ			
1983	NSW Div. 1 (2)	24	7	4	13	36	46	18	9th	–	Not Held	DNQ			
1984	NSW Div. 1 (2)	22	6	6	10	20	41	18	8th	–	Not Held	DNQ			
1985	NSW Div. 1 (2)	22	14	5	3	49	24	33	1st ↑	PF	Not Held	DNQ			
1986	NSL/NC (Note: During 1984 to 1986, the league was split into two conferences – Canterbury played in the Northern Conference and the position in the table reflects position in the conference.) (1)	22	2	7	13	17	41	11	11th	–	Not Held	1R			
1987	NSW Div. 1 (2)	26	5	6	15	26	64	16	13th	–	Not Held	DNQ			
1988	NSW Div. 1 (2)	26	7	6	13	34	55	20	12th	–	Not Held	DNQ			
1989	NSW Div. 1 (2)	22	10	4	8	33	27	24	5th	–	Not Held	DNQ			
1990	NSW Div. 1 (2)	16	4	7	5	18	23	15	12th	–	GS	DNQ			
1991	NSW Div. 1^{P} (2)	22	8	7+3	4	35	19	41	6th	–	QF	DNQ			
1992	NSWSL^{P} (2)	22	9	3+1	9	31	29	34	7th	–	?PR	DNQ			
1993	NSWSL^{P} (2)	26	15	4+1	6	40	36	54	4th	EF	?QF/SF	DNQ			
1994	NSWSL^{P} (2)	22	10	3+4	5	35	28	40	2nd	RU	?PR	?			
1995	NSWSL^{P} (2)	26	9	7+3	7	32	35	44	3rd	PF	RU	DNQ			
1996	NSWSL^{1} (2)	13	2	4	7	19	28	10	12th	–	QF	DNQ			
1996	NSWSL^{2} (2)	13	5	4	4	14	15	19	6th	–	QF	DNQ			
1997	NSWSL (2)	20	5	8	7	26	38	23	7th	–	QF	DNQ			
1998	NSWSL (2)	22	12	4	6	36	30	40	4th	EF	Not Held	Not Held			
1999	NSWSL (2)	22	10	4	8	33	36	34	8th	–	Not Held	Not Held			
2000	NSWSL (2)	26	10	3	13	36	49	33	8th	–	Not Held	Not Held			
2000–01	NSWPL (2)	18	8	4	6	34	28	28	4th	SF	Not Held	Not Held			
2001–02	NSWPL (2)	22	5	3	14	25	49	18	9th	–	Not Held	Not Held			
2002–03	NSWPL (2)	22	8	8	6	36	26	32	7th	–	Not Held	Not Held			
2003–04	NSWPL (2)	22	4	5	13	28	46	17	12th ↓	–	QF	Not Held			
2005	NSWSL (3)	26	14	4	8	59	46	46	2nd	W	4R	Not Held			
2006 (Note: Name changed to Canterbury Bankstown Berries for two seasons)	NSWSL/A (Note: After 15 rounds, the competition split into two conferences (A and B) to play the remaining 7 rounds, with overall top 5 making finals. Canterbury Bankstown was placed in Group A. The position place reflects that of Group A, not overall position.) (3)	22	7	5	10	40	39	26	7th ↓	–	SF	Not Held			
2007	NSW Div. 1 (4)	26	19	4	3	69	21	61	1st (Note: Canterbury was promoted two divisions into NSW Premier League (the highest state league division)) ↑	RU	3R	Not Held			
2008 (Note: Name changed to West Sydney Berries for four seasons)	NSWPL (2)	22	7	3	12	30	41	24	8th	–	3R	Not Held			
2009	NSWPL (2)	22	8	6	8	37	37	30	6th	–	3R	Not Held			
2010	NSWPL (2)	22	2	6	14	17	50	12	12th ↓	–	3R	Not Held			
2011	NSWSL (3)	22	10	8	4	52	28	38	2nd	RU	4R	Not Held			
2012 (Note: Name changed to Bankstown Berries for six seasons)	NSWSL (3)	22	13	5	4	52	29	44	3rd	RU	SF	Not Held			
2013	NPL NSW 2 (3)	22	8	9	5	42	34	33	5th	EF	4R	Not Held			
2014	NPL NSW 2 (3)	22	7	2	13	32	45	23	10th	–	4R				
2015	NPL NSW 2 (3)	22	9	4	9	32	37	31	7th	—	5R				
2016	NPL NSW 2 (3)	26	8	5	13	47	58	29	13th	–	7R				
2017	NPL NSW 2 (3)	26	9	6	11	40	45	33	10th	—	PO	R16			
2018 (Note: Name changed to Canterbury Bankstown FC)	NPL NSW 2 (3)	26	8	5	13	36	48	29	10th	—	DNP				
2019	NPL NSW 2 (3)	26	5	2	19	32	72	17	14th ↓	—	4R				
2020	NPL NSW 3 (4)	11	5	4	2	20	13	19	4th	SF	cancelled				
2021	NPL NSW 3 (4)	16	3	6	7	22	33	15	season cancelled			6R			
2022	NSW League 2 (4)	22	12	2	8	48	37	38	4th ↑	EF	5R				
2023	NSW League 1 (3)	30	17	4	9	52	36	55	5th	N/A	4R				

Correct as of 16 September 2023

Source OzFootball
