= 1964 NSW First Division season =

NSW First Division
- Season: 1964
- Champions: APIA Leichhardt FC
- Premiers: APIA Leichhardt FC
- Matches: 132
- Goals: 532 (4.03 per match)
- Best Player: Trevor Edwards
- Top goalscorer: Johnny Watkiss (24)

The 1964 NSW First Division season was the eighth season of soccer in New South Wales under the administration of the NSW Federation of Soccer Clubs since its breakaway from the NSW Soccer Football Association in January 1957. The home and away regular season began March and ended in August after 22 rounds. APIA Leichhardt FC finished first on the ladder to become regular season premiers for the first time in its history with the federation.

The finals series was primarily held throughout September with a four-team playoff series. After two previous defeats in grand finals, regular season premiers APIA Leichhardt recorded their first championship with a 7–2 victory over Budapest in the grand final.

The pre-season Ampol Cup was won for a fourth time by Sydney FC Prague.

== Clubs ==
Changes from last season:

- Auburn and Gladesville-Ryde merged to form Cumberland United (therefore no team was relegated to Second Division).
- Corinthian BESC were promoted from Second Division.

Club	Ground	Year formed	App	Debut	Last season (Finals)
A.P.I.A.	Lambert Park; Sydney Sports Ground	1954	8th	1957	2nd (RU)
Bankstown	Bankstown Oval	1944	8th	1957	10th
Budapest	Hurstville Oval	1957	6th	1959	6th
Canterbury-Marrickville	Arlington Oval	1896 (Note: reformed in 1943 and 1951)	8th	1957	7th
Corinthian BESC	No fixed ground	1957	1st	1964	Div. II
Croatia	Arlington Oval	1958	2nd	1963	11th
Cumberland United	Mona Park	1964	1st	1964	(Note: Auburn were placed 12th and Gladesville-Ryde were placed 5th)
Hakoah	Wentworth Park	1939	8th	1957	9th
Pan Hellenic	Wentworth Park	1957	4th	1961	4th (SF)
Prague	Sydney Athletics Field	1950	8th	1957	1st (PF)
South Coast United	Woonona Oval	1958 (Note: Amalgamated with IDSA club Woonona-Bulli. Continues Corrimal United history)	7th	1958	3rd (W)
Yugal	Sydney Athletics Field	1961	3rd	1962	8th

== Table and results ==
Pos	Team	Pld	W	D	L	GF	GA	GD	Pts	Qualification or relegation
1	A.P.I.A. (C)	22	14	3	5	59	35	+24	31	Qualification for Finals series
2	St. George-Budapest	22	12	4	6	53	34	+19	28	Qualification for Finals series
3	South Coast United	22	11	6	5	39	28	+11	28	Qualification for Finals series
4	Prague	22	13	1	8	50	32	+18	27	Qualification for Finals series
5	Yugal-Ryde	22	12	3	7	49	47	+2	27	
6	Pan Hellenic	22	12	1	9	49	44	+5	25	
7	Hakoah	22	11	2	9	44	40	+4	24	
8	Cumberland United	22	9	4	9	53	40	+13	22	
9	Croatia Maroubra	22	6	6	10	36	44	−8	18	
10	Bankstown (R)	22	6	5	11	35	47	−12	17	Relegated to Second Division
11	Corinthian BESC (R)	22	3	4	15	39	62	−23	10	Relegated to Second Division
12	Canterbury-Marrickville (R)	22	3	1	18	26	79	−53	7	Relegated to Second Division

(C) Champions; (R) Relegated

=== Results ===
Home \ Away	API	BAN	BUD	CAN	CRO	COR	CUM	HAK	PAN	PRA	SCU	YUG
APIA		1–1	4–2	4–0	6–0	4–1	1–1	2–1	6–2	1–3	2–0	1–3
Bankstown	0–1		1–3	2–3	1–1	1–2	0–4	3–3	1–3	3–1	1–3	0–3
Budapest-St George	2–1	1–1		6–2	2–2	3–0	2–1	4–2	1–2	1–0	0–2	4–2
Canterbury-Marrickville	2–4	0–3	1–3		1–6	2–2	0–4	1–3	3–1	1–2	2–3	1–3
Croatia Maroubra	2–4	1–1	1–1	0–2		2–2	1–5	0–1	2–3	2–1	0–1	3–1
Corinthian BESC	2–5	2–3	0–2	4–0	2–3		0–2	0–3	2–3	3–5	2–5	3–3
Cumberland United	1–2	3–2	4–4	5–0	3–1	5–3		2–2	1–2	3–2	2–2	2–3
Hakoah	2–5	0–2	2–1	3–1	2–1	4–2	3–0		3–1	1–3	1–2	3–1
Pan Hellenic	6–2	5–1	1–2	5–0	2–4	2–0	3–2	0–4		2–1	0–1	2–2
Prague	2–3	0–2	4–3	5–0	1–0	4–0	1–0	5–1	2–1		4–2	1–2
South Coast United	0–0	3–5	1–0	5–0	1–1	1–1	3–1	2–0	0–3	0–0		2–3
Yugal-Ryde	2–0	4–1	0–6	6–4	1–3	0–6	3–2	2–0	4–0	1–3	0–0	

Source: www.socceraust.co.uk
Legend: Blue = home team win; Yellow = draw; Red = away team win.

== Finals series ==
Semi-finals; 30 Aug.–6 Sep.
Major Semifinal
1	A.P.I.A.	0
2	Budapest	3
Minor Semifinal
3	South Coast	2
4	Prague	1

Preliminary final 13 Sep.
1	A.P.I.A.	2
3	South Coast	1

Grand final 20 September
2	Budapest	2
3	A.P.I.A.	7

=== Semi-finals ===
30 August 1964 Minor semi-final	South Coast United	2–1	Prague	Moore Park, Sydney
	Barnett 32'; Handorf 68' (o.g.)	Report	Blitz 74'	Stadium: Sydney Sports Ground; Attendance: 11,018; Referee: Jack Scarborough

6 September 1964 Major semi-final	A.P.I.A.	0–3	Budapest	Moore Park, Sydney
		Report	J. Warren 65', 86'; Stokes 9'	Stadium: Sydney Sports Ground; Attendance: 13,916; Referee: Hank Eilerts

=== Preliminary final ===
13 September 1964	A.P.I.A.	2–1	South Coast United	Moore Park, Sydney
	Giacometti	Report	J. Harris	Stadium: Sydney Sports Ground; Attendance: 13,783; Referee: Keith Lockrey

=== Grand Final ===
20 September 1964

Budapest	2–7	A.P.I.A.
Hughes (o.g.); Galambos		Watkiss (x5); Giacometti; Wong

Sydney Sports Ground, Moore Park, Sydney
Attendance: 22,366
Referee: Tony Boskovic

GK	1	(Australia) Mel Clarke
RB	2	(Austria) Herbert Stegbauer
LB	3	(Hungary) Tibor Zuckermann
RH	4	(Australia) Manfred Schaefer
CH	5	(Socialist Federal Republic of Yugoslavia) Peter Banicevic
LH	6	(Australia) Hugo Rodriguez
OR	7	(England) Alfie Stokes
IR	8	(Australia) Johnny Warren
CF	9	(Australia) Joe Galambos
IL	10	(Argentina) Vic Fernandez
OL	11	(Australia) L. Heredia
Coach:
(Hungary) Laurie Hegyes

GK	1	(Spain) Adauto Iglesias
RB	2	(Australia) Cliff van Blerk
LB	3	(England) Stan Ackerley
RH	4	(Scotland) Pat Hughes
CH	5	(Australia) R. Murua
LH	6	(Australia) Phil Bottalico
OR	7	(Australia) Duncan Falconer
IR	8	(Australia) John Giacometti
CF	9	(Australia) Johnny Watkiss
IL	10	(Australia) Johnny Wong
OL	11	(Australia) Karl Jaros
Coach:
(Hungary) Gyula Polgár

NSWSF First Division
1964 Premiers

A.P.I.A.
First Title

== Statistics and awards ==
=== Stars of 1964 ===
Soccer World reporters awarded stars out of six to players throughout the 22 rounds. The player with the highest stars was Trevor Edwards with 4.23 (from 17 matches). Only 11 players average four points or more. South Coast United and Sydney Croatia both had three players, Prague had three players, whilst Hakoah, APIA, Pan Hellenic, Canterbury and Prague all had one player that averaged four points or more. Below left is the list of all eleven players and below right is the team of the year:

Player	Team	Rating
Trevor Edwards	Hakoah	4.23
Pat Woods	South Coast United	4.21
Alan Hetherington	Croatia	4.09
Pat Hughes	A.P.I.A.	4.09
Noberto Bischoff	Croatia	4.05
Omar Collazo	Croatia	4.05
Brian Smith	Pan Hellenic	4.05
Ron Corry	Canterbury-Marrickville	4.00
Fred Falzon	Prague	4.00
Jim Harris	South Coast United	4.00
Brian Rhodes	South Coast United	4.00

1964 Team of the Year

=== Top scorers ===
Johnny Watkiss was the season's top goalscorer with 24 goals, recording the lowest tally for a top goalscorer since the inception of the league in 1957. Below is a list of the top ten goalscorers for the season:

Player	Team	Goals
Johnny Watkiss	APIA	24
Joe Galambos	Budapest	20
Doug Logan	Pan Hellenic	17
Graham Barnett	South Coast United	15
Herbert Ninaus	Hakoah	15
Tony Nincevich	Yugal-Ryde	14
Jim Richardson	Cumberland United	14
Brian Tristram	Prague	13
Peter Barnes	Corinthian BESC	11
Vic Fernandez	Budapest	11
B. Kelly	Cumberland United	11
Les Scheinflug	Prague	11

=== Attendances ===
Below is a list of attendances by club:

Rank	Club	Attendance
1	APIA	150,000
2	Pan Hellenic	133,000
3	South Coast United	84,000
4	Hakoah	79,500
5	Prague	78,500
6	SSC Yugal	77,000
7	Budapest	66,000
8	Croatia	64,000
9	Cumberland United	54,500
10	Canterbury-Marrickville	40,500
11	Bankstown	38,000
12	Corinthian BESC	33,500

== Other competitions ==
=== Ampol Cup ===
The season began with the eighth edition of the floodlight pre-season night series (seventh as the Ampol Cup) on Friday 31 January 1964, culminating with the double-header third place playoff and Final on Friday, 6 March 1964 in front of 8,400 spectators.

==== Finals series ====
Quarter-finals
Budapest	3
South Coast	0
A.P.I.A.	3
Yugal	2
Croatia	5
Pan Hellenic	3
Prague	3
Hakoah	0

Semi-finals
Budapest	1
A.P.I.A.	2
Croatia	1
Prague	2

Finals
A.P.I.A.	1
Prague	2
Third place playoff
Budapest	4
Croatia	1

==== Final ====
6 March 1964

APIA	1–2	Prague
Sinclair	Report	Tristram; Blitz

Attendance: 8,400
Referee: Tony Boskovic

== See also ==
- 1964 in Australian soccer
- 1964 NSWSF season
- 1964 NSW Federation Cup
