= David Edwards =

David Edwards may refer to:

== Music ==
- David "Honeyboy" Edwards (1915–2011), American blues singer and guitarist
- Dave Edwards (musician) (1941–2000), American musician
- David Edwards (singer) (1964–2021), Welsh musician
- David Eugene Edwards (born 1968), American musician; lead singer of Woven Hand and 16 Horsepower
- Minotaur Shock, stage name of David Edwards, British electronica musician

== Sports ==
- Dave Edwards (baseball) (born 1954), former MLB player
- David Edwards (golfer) (born 1956), American PGA Tour and Champions Tour player
- David Edwards (sailor) (born 1973), Australian sailor
- David Edwards (curler) (born 1979), Scottish curler
- David Edwards (cyclist) (born 1993), Australian cyclist
- David Edwards (basketball) (1971–2020), American basketball player
- David Edwards (rower) (1937–2019), English rower

Association football

- Dave Edwards (Scottish footballer) (1900–1946), early twentieth century association football goalkeeper
- David Edwards (footballer, born 1934) (1934–2021), Welsh footballer
- David Edwards (footballer, born 1974), English footballer
- David Edwards (footballer, born 1986), Wales international footballer

Cricket

- David Edwards (Cambridgeshire cricketer) (1805–1850), English cricketer
- David Edwards (cricketer, born 1980), English cricketer

Gridiron football

- David Farragut Edwards (c. 1872–1930), American football coach
- Dave Edwards (linebacker) (1939–2016), NFL linebacker
- Dave Edwards (defensive back) (born 1962), NFL defensive back
- David Edwards (motivational speaker) (1987–2008), American high school football player and motivational speaker
- David Edwards (offensive lineman) (born 1997), American football offensive lineman

Rugby

- Dai Edwards (1896–1960), Wales dual-code rugby international
- David Edwards (rugby union, born 1930) (1930–2006), Scottish rugby union player
- David Edwards (rugby union, born 1970), Tongan rugby union player

== Other ==
- David Edwards (minister) (1660–1716), Welsh independent minister who lived in the Vale of Aeron
- David Edwards (soldier) (1841–1897), American soldier who fought in the American Civil War
- David Edwards (judge) (1871–1936), Australian judge
- David Miall Edwards (1873–1941), Welsh Non-conformist writer and theologian
- Dai Edwards (engineer) (David Beverley George Edwards, 1928–2020), Welsh computer engineer
- David Edwards (priest) (1929–2018), English Anglican dean of Norwich
- Dave Edwards (Wyoming politician) (1938–2013), American politician
- David Edwards (quiz contestant) (born 1947), Welsh game show winner
- David Edwards (engineer) (born 1961), American biomedical engineering professor, writer and experimental artist
- David Edwards (journalist) (born 1962), British political writer
- David Edwards (Oregon politician) (born 1966), member of the Oregon State House of Representatives
- David Edwards (bishop), Anglican bishop of Fredericton, Canada

== See also ==
- David Edward (born 1934), Scottish lawyer and academic
- David Edwardes (fl. 1529–1532), English anatomist
