= 1965 NSW Federation Cup =

Tournament details
- Country: Australia (NSW)
- Teams: 22

Final positions
- Champions: Hakoah
- Runners-up: Pan Hellenic

Tournament statistics
- Matches played: 21
- Goals scored: 115 (5.48 per match)

The 1965 NSW Federation Cup was the ninth edition of the NSW Soccer Federation's premier soccer cup. Also named the Henry Seamonds Trophy, the cup was open to all clubs in the first and second divisions. The winners would qualify as the federation's number one seed for the 1965 Australia Cup.

St. George-Budapest were the defending champions, but were eliminated in a quarter-finals by a 4–2 scoreline to APIA Leichhardt.

The final was played on 16 October 1965 between Hakoah and Pan Hellenic, with Hakoah winning the match 3–1 to claim their fourth Federation Cup title.

== Format and clubs ==
Round	Clubs remaining	Clubs advancing from previous round	New entries this round	Main match dates
First Round	22 → 18	N/A	12 clubs from NSW Second Division	from 6 March 1965
Second Round	16 → 8	6 winners from First Round	10 clubs from NSW First Division	from 13 March 1965
Quarter-finals	8 → 4	8 winners from Second Round	none	from 24 April 1965
Semi-finals	4 → 2	4 winners from quarter-finals	none	from 3 October 1965
Final	2 → 1	2 winners from semi-finals	none	16 October 1965

== First Round ==
The First Round saw all twelve Second Division clubs playoff against each other.

Tie no.	Date	Team 1 (div.)	Score	Team 2 (div.)
1	6 March 1965	Sutherland Shire (2)	3–2	Marconi (2)
2	6 March 1965	Corinthian BESC (2)	12–1	Thistle (2)
3	7 March 1965	Wollongong Olympic (2)	0–0 (a.e.t.) (9–8 pens.)	Melita Eagles (2)
4	7 March 1965	Canterbury-Marrickville (2)	7–1	Concordia (2)
5	7 March 1965	Bankstown (2)	4–0	Sydney Austral (2)
6	7 March 1965	Western United (2)	3–2	Granville-AEK (2)

== Second Round ==
The ten First Division clubs entered the Second Round, directly playing winners from the First Round. Four First Division teams would play off against each other, Hakoah against Polonia-North Side and South Coast United against Prague.

Tie no.	Date	Team 1 (div.)	Score	Team 2 (div.)
7	13 March 1965	Cumberland United (1)	9–1	Sutherland Shire (2)
8	13 March 1965	Hakoah (1)	5–0	Polonia-North Side (1)
9	14 March 1965	South Coast United (2)	3–2	Prague (1)
10	14 March 1965	Pan Hellenic (1)	5–1	Corinthian BESC (2)
11	27 March 1965	Yugal (1)	7–0	Wollongong Olympic (2)
12	27 March 1965	Metropolitan Adriatic (1)	2–1	Canterbury-Marrickville (2)
13	28 March 1965	St. George-Budapest (1)	12–2	Western United (2)
14	28 March 1965	A.P.I.A. Leichhardt (1)	2–0	Bankstown (2)

== Quarter-finals ==
24 April 1965	Hakoah	3–0	Cumberland United
	D. Edwards; Marnock; Hood			Attendance: 2,400; Referee: H. Parsons

24 April 1965	Metropolitan Adriatic	0–6	Yugal
			Vicevic; Nincevic; Lilac	Attendance: 2,400; Referee: D. Buchan

25 April 1965	St. George-Budapest	2–4	A.P.I.A. Leichhardt
	G. Yardley; J. Warren		J. Wong; Giacometti; Jaros	Attendance: 8,200; Referee: J. Scarborough

5 May 1965	Pan Hellenic	3–2	South Coast United
	Xanthopoulos; B. Smith; J. Smith		Holder; Woods	Attendance: 3,133; Referee: Anton Boskovic
Note: Match originally began on 25 April 1965 but was abandoned due to a pitch invasion with Pan Hellenic leading 1–0.

== Semi-finals ==
3 October 1965	Hakoah	1–0	Yugal
	J. Christie			Attendance: 7,200; Referee: H. Eilerts

3 October 1965	Pan Hellenic	2–1	A.P.I.A. Leichhardt
	Fernie; Karyannis		McKinnon	Attendance: 7,200; Referee: H. Parsons

== Final ==
16 October 1965

Hakoah (1)	3–1	Pan Hellenic (1)
Gerry Hood 10', 25'; Jim Christie 30'	Report	John Demos 59'

Wentworth Park, Glebe, Sydney
Attendance: 2,000
Referee: A. R. Brown

1	(Australia) Peter Fuzes
2	(Wales) Trevor Edwards
3	(Australia) Ian Hillsdon
4	(Australia) Danny Walsh
5	(Australia) Alan Marnock
6	(Wales) David Edwards
7	(Australia) Robert Fekete
8	(Australia) Jim Christie
9	(Australia) Herbert Ninaus
10	(Argentina) Gerry Hood
11	(England) Doug Holden
Coach:
(Socialist Federal Republic of Yugoslavia) Tiko Jelisavcic

1	(Australia) Ron Corry
2	(Australia) George Yangou
3	(Australia) Douglas Wright	Red card
4	(Australia) David Johnston
5	(Australia) John Cole
6	(Australia) Johnny Sanchez
7	(Australia) John Demos
8	(Scotland) Jim Fernie
9	(Australia) George McCulloch
10	(Australia) Doug Logan
11	(Australia) Jim Pearson
Coach:
(Australia) Walter Tamandl

NSW Federation Cup
1965 Champions

Hakoah
Fourth Title
