= 1961 NSWSF season =

NSW Federation of Soccer Clubs
- Season: 1961
- Champions: Sydney Hakoah
- Premiers: Sydney Prague
- Matches: 137
- Goals: 568 (4.15 per match)
- Top goalscorer: Les Schauman (28 goals)
- Biggest home win: Budapest 9–1 Sydney Austral
- Biggest away win: APIA Leichhardt 1–6 Hakoah; Sydney Austral 1–6 APIA Leichhardt; Sydney Austral 2–7 Gladesville-Ryde
- Highest scoring: Hakoah 10–4 Sydney Austral

The 1961 New South Wales Federation of Soccer Clubs (NSWSF) season was the fifth season of football in New South Wales under the administration of the federation since its breakaway from the NSW Soccer Football Association in January of 1957. The home and away league season began on the 15th of April with twelve teams, reducing the number of teams by two compared to the previous season. Sydney Prague were Federation Premiers for a third consecutive season after finishing first on the ladder of the twenty-two round regular season.

After defeating Federation Premiers, Prague, in the preliminary final, Hakoah went on to defeat reigning champions Canterbury-Marrickville 4–1 in the grand final to be crowned Federation Champions for the first time.

Other tournaments held this season once again included the Ampol Cup and the Federation Cup (this year renamed the 'Craven A' Cup). Prague were the Ampol Cup winners for the second time as were Hakoah in the Federation Cup.

== Clubs ==
Changes from last season

- Number of teams reduced from 14 to 12.
- Pan Hellenic were promoted into the competition from Second Division for the first time.
- Granville AEK, Balgownie and Manly were relegated to Second Division.
- Corrimal United merged with Illawarra District Soccer Association club, Woonona-Bulli to form South Coast United
- North Side United–E.P.T. merged with Polonia to form Polonia North Side.

Club	Ground	Colours	Founded	App	Debut	Last season
A.P.I.A.-Leichhardt	Lambert Park, Leichhardt	Maroon and blue	1954	5th	1957	2nd (preliminary finalists)
Auburn SFC	Mona Park, Auburn	Green and gold	1957	5th	1957	4th (minor semifinalists)
Bankstown SFC	Wiley Park	Green and gold	1944	5th	1957	8th
Budapest–South Sydney	Sydney Athletics Field, Moore Park	Red, white and green	1957	3rd	1959	6th
Canterbury-Marrickville	Arlington Oval, Dulwich Hill	Blue and gold	1896 (Note: As Canterbury Bankstown in 1943. As Canterbury-Marrickville in 1951.)	5th	1957	3rd (winners)
Gladesville-Ryde	Gladesville Sports Ground, Gladesville	Gold and black	1951	4th	1957	8th
Hakoah	Wentworth Park, Glebe	Blue and white	1953	4th	1957	4th (preliminary finalists)
Pan Hellenic	Wentworth Park, Glebe	Light blue and white	1957	1st	1961	Div. II
Polonia–North Side	Drummoyne Oval and North Sydney Oval	Red, black and white	1961	1st	1961	(Note: North Side finished 7th in Div. I, Polonia played in Div. II)
South Coast United	Balls Paddock, Woonona	Dark blue, red and white	1958 (Note: Corrimal United merged with Woonona-Bulli for 1961 season. Keeps Corrimal United's historical records)	4th	1958	11th
Prague	Sydney Athletics Field, Moore Park	Black with red, white and blue sash	1952	5th	1957	1st (runners-up)
Sydney Austral	Sydney Cricket Ground No. 2, Moore Park	Orange, white and blue	1952	5th	1957	10th

== Regular season ==
=== Table and results ===
Pos	Team	Pld	W	D	L	GF	GA	GD	Pts	Qualification or relegation
1	Prague	22	14	5	3	59	34	+25	33	1961 Federation Finals
2	Canterbury-Marrickville	22	13	5	4	51	27	+24	31	1961 Federation Finals
3	Hakoah (C)	22	12	6	4	64	38	+26	30	1961 Federation Finals
4	Pan Hellenic	22	11	5	6	46	36	+10	27	1961 Federation Finals
5	Polonia–North Side	22	11	5	6	51	44	+7	27	
6	APIA	22	10	4	8	55	42	+13	24	
7	Budapest-South Sydney	22	9	3	10	53	52	+1	21	
8	Bankstown	22	8	4	10	41	40	+1	20	
9	Auburn	22	7	6	9	42	42	0	20	
10	South Coast United	22	7	1	14	42	55	−13	15	
11	Gladesville-Ryde	22	6	3	13	35	49	−14	15	
12	Sydney Austral (R)	22	0	1	21	25	105	−80	1	Relegation to NSWSF Second Division for next season.

Source: www.rsssf.org
Rules for classification: 1) points; 2) goal difference; 3) number of goals scored.
(C) Champions; (R) Relegated

=== Results ===
Home \ Away	API	AUB	BAN	BUD	CAN	GLR	HAK	PAN	PNS	PRA	SCU	SAU
APIA		5–0	1–3	3–0	1–1	2–3	1–6	3–0	1–5	2–2	2–0	5–0
Auburn	3–4		0–1	3–2	1–3	1–1	1–3	0–3	1–1	5–0	3–2	7–0
Bankstown	0–3	0–1		2–3	2–0	1–0	2–4	0–0	3–0	1–2	5–0	6–2
Budapest	2–2	2–1	4–3		0–0	4–2	3–4	2–2	0–1	1–4	5–1	9–1
Canterbury-Marrickville	3–0	1–2	5–1	1–3		2–1	2–1	1–0	5–0	2–2	4–2	2–0
Gladesville Ryde	0–4	1–1	1–2	3–5	1–2		1–0	2–3	1–0	0–2	0–2	2–1
Hakoah	6–3	3–2	2–2	2–1	1–1	5–1		2–2	1–1	1–3	7–2	10–4
Pan Hellenic	0–3	1–0	2–1	2–0	3–5	4–1	1–1		4–2	1–1	6–2	3–1
Polonia–North Side	3–1	1–2	2–2	4–3	3–2	2–2	1–1	3–2		3–2	3–1	5–0
Prague	2–2	3–3	3–1	5–0	3–2	2–1	1–2	2–0	7–4		3–2	5–0
South Coast United	2–0	1–1	1–0	4–0	0–2	2–4	3–1	2–4	0–1	1–3		7–0
Sydney Austral	1–6	4–4	2–3	2–4	0–3	2–7	0–1	2–3	2–6	0–2	1–5	

Legend: Blue = home team win; Yellow = draw; Red = away team win.

== Finals series ==
Semi-finals
Major semi-final
1	Prague	3
2	Canterbury	5
Minor semi-final
3	Hakoah	1
4	Pan Hellenic	0

Final
1	Prague	(0)0
3	Hakoah	(0)1

Grand Final
2	Canterbury	1
3	Hakoah	4

=== Semi-finals ===
16 September 1961 Minor semi-final	Hakoah	1–0	Pan Hellenic	Wentworth Park, Glebe
	Jaros	Report		Attendance: 9,300; Referee: Roy Pearce

17 September 1961 Major semi-final	Prague	3–5	Canterbury	Sydney Sports Ground, Moore Park
	Jeffrey; Ninaus	Report	Watkiss; Amigo; Smith	Attendance: 11,500; Referee: Frank Sbisa

=== Preliminary final ===
24 September 1961	Prague	0–0 (a.e.t.)	Hakoah	Wentworth Park, Glebe
		Report		Attendance: 13,600; Referee: Roy Pearce

27 September 1961 Replay	Prague	0–1	Hakoah	Redfern Oval, Redfern
		Report	Levi	Attendance: 6,400; Referee: Roy Pearce

=== Grand final ===
1 October 1961
Grand Final

Canterbury-Marrickville	1–4	Hakoah
Watkiss	Report	Jaros; Levi; Neal

Henson Park, Marrickville
Attendance: 18,432 (Note: Australian attendance record)
Referee: Roy Pearce

GK	1	(Australia) Ron Brown
RB	2	(Australia) Tom North
LB	3	(Australia) George Nuttal
RH	4	(Australia) Don Brown
CH	5	(Australia) John Curry
LH	6	(Australia) Geoff Campbell
OR	7	(Spain) José "Joe" Amigo
IR	8	(Australia) Brian Smith
CF	9	(Australia) Johnny Watkiss
IL	10	(Australia) Johnny Warren
OL	11	(Australia) Barry Salisbury
Coach:
(Australia)

GK	1	(Austria) Heinz Wenzl
RB	2	(Austria) Viktor Mach
LB	3	(Australia) Jock Aird
RH	4	(Australia) Ron Kearns
CH	5	(Austria) Adolf Handorf
LH	6	(Austria) Adolf Blutsch
OR	7	(Austria) Peter Hrncir
IR	8	(Israel) Moshe "Gerry" Chaldi
CF	9	(Israel) Raffi Levi
IL	10	(Australia) Ray Neal
OL	11	(Austria) Karl Jaros
Coach: (Austria) Karl Jaros

NSWSF First Division
1961 Premiers

Hakoah
First Title

== Awards and statistics ==
=== Top goal-scorers ===
Rank	Player	Club	Goals
1	Les Schauman	Budapest–South Sydney	28
2	Herbert Ninaus	Sydney FC Prague	24
2	V. Wentzel	APIA Leichhardt	24
4	R. Levi	Sydney Hakoah	22
5	Robert Burgoyne	Pan Hellenic	18

=== Attendance ===
Below is a list of total attendances per club in all matches, both home and away.

Club	Attendance
APIA Leichhardt FC	114,000
Pan Hellenic	97,000
Sydney Hakoah	96,500
Sydney FC Prague	95,000
Canterbury-Marrickville	69,000
Polonia–North Side	65,600
South Coast United	52,000
Budapest–South Sydney	50,800
Auburn SFC	49,000
Gladesville-Ryde DSFC	38,000
Bankstown SFC	36,000
Sydney Austral SFC	23,000

== Other competitions ==
=== Ampol Cup ===
Originally formed in 1957 as the William Kennard Cup, this was the fourth year to be sponsored by Ampol.

==== Final ====
9 April 1961
Final

Prague	6–3	Hakoah
	Report

=== Craven A Federation Cup ===
This was the fifth year contesting the Federation Cup, named the Craven A for sponsorship reasons.

==== Final ====
15 October 1961
Final

Hakoah	2–0	Canterbury-Marrickville
	Report
