= 1966 NSW Federation Cup =

Tournament details
- Country: Australia (NSW)
- Teams: 16

Final positions
- Champions: APIA Leichhardt
- Runners-up: St. George-Budapest

Tournament statistics
- Matches played: 16

The 1966 NSW Federation Cup (Henry Seamonds Trophy) was the tenth and final edition of the NSW Soccer Federation's premier soccer cup. The cup was open to all ten clubs in the first and six second division clubs.

Sydney Hakoah were the defending champions, but were eliminated by St. George Budapest in the semi-finals when they lost 1–2.

The final was played on 22 May 1966 between APIA Leichhardt and St. George Budapest, with APIA winning the match 3–2 to claim their second Federation Cup title.

== Format and clubs ==
Round	Clubs remaining	Clubs advancing from previous round	New entries this round	Main match dates
First Round	16 → 8	N/A	10 clubs from NSW First Division; 6 clubs from NSW Second Division	from 27 March 1966
Quarter-finals	8 → 4	8 winners from First Round	none	from 11 April 1966
Semi-finals	4 → 2	4 winners from quarter-finals	none	from 1 May 1966
Final	2 → 1	2 winners from semi-finals	none	22 May 1966

== First Round ==
The First Round saw all ten First Division and the top 6 Second Division clubs from the previous season participate.

Tie no.	Date	Team 1	Score	Team 2
1		Canterbury-Marrickville	1–0	Granville-AEK
2		Croatia-South Sydney	5–0	Prague
3		Sydney Hakoah	5–1	Bankstown
4		St. George-Budapest	6–4	Pan Hellenic
5		South Coast United	1–0	Melita Eagles
6		Yugal	3–2 (a.e.t.)	Cumberland United
7		Polonia-North Side	3–1	Wollongong Olympic
8		APIA Leichhardt	6–1	Corinthian BESC

== Quarter-finals ==
St. George-Budapest	3–0	Canterbury-Marrickville
Sandell; Warren; Fernandez			Attendance: 4,400; Referee: F. Woolman

Yugal	2–0	Croatia-South Sydney
Bobic			Attendance: 4,400; Referee: L. Wilson

Sydney Hakoah	5–1	Polonia-North Side
Reid; Ninaus; Edwards; Christie		Krawiarz	Attendance: 3,140; Referee: J. Scarborough

APIA Leichhardt	0–0 (a.e.t.) (4–1 p)	South Coast United
			Attendance: 3,140; Referee: H. Parsons

== Semi-finals ==
St. George-Budapest	2–1	Sydney Hakoah
Warren; Stegbauer		Ninaus	Attendance: 7,000; Referee: F. Woolman

APIA Leichhardt	5–2	Yugal
Giacometti; Blue		Alagich	Attendance: 7,000; Referee: Anton Boskovic

== Third place playoff ==
Sydney Hakoah	1–1	Yugal
Duffy		Vicevic	Attendance: 8,632; Referee: J. Scarborough

== Final ==
APIA Leichhardt	3–2	St. George-Budapest
Blue; Kerklaan; Giacometti		Yardley; Zuckerman

Attendance: 8,632
Referee: H. Parsons

1	(Australia) Bill Rorke
2	(Australia) George Nutall
3	(Australia) Stan Ackerley
4	(Australia) David Muir
5	(Australia) Jim Sambrook
6	(Australia) Phil Bottalico
7	(Australia) John Giacometti
8	(Australia) Ricardo Campana
9	(Scotland) Archie Blue
10	(Australia) Johnny Watkiss
11	(Australia) Bill Kerklaan
Substitutes:
	none
Coach:
(Australia) Joe Marston

1	(Scotland) Frank Haffey
2	(Australia) Herbert Stegbauer
3	(Australia) Roger Hillary
4	(Germany) Manfred Schaefer
5	(Australia) Petar Banicevic
6	(Australia) Tibor Zuckerman
7	(Australia) Alan Hillhouse
8	(Australia) Johnny Warren
9	(Scotland) George Yardley
10	(Australia) Salvador Isaac
11	(Australia) Noel Telfer	Substituted off
Substitutes:
12	(Australia) Don Sandell	Substituted on
Coach:
(Hungary) Laurie Hegyes

NSW Federation Cup
1966 Champions

APIA Leichhardt
Second Title
