= Keith Learmonth =

Australian soccer player (born 1933)

Personal information
- Place of birth: Wollongong, New South Wales, Australia
- Positions: Centre-forward; inside forward

Youth career
- Gwynneville SFC
- North Wollongong SFC

Senior career*
Years	Team	Apps	(Gls)
1951–1957	Corrimal Rangers		
1958–1960	Corrimal United	68	(53)
Total		68+	(53+)

International career
1955	Australia	1	(0)
1955–1959	Australia non-A	6	(2)
1947	Australia U-15		
- * Club domestic league appearances and goals

Keith Learmonth (born in 1933) is a former Australian soccer player.

== Early life ==
Learmonth was raised in Wollongong, New South Wales.

== Career ==
=== Early career ===
Growing up in Fairy Meadow, Learmonth played for his school team and local junior side, Gwynneville SC – who played in green and gold at Wiseman's Park. His prowess was seen at an early age, making various junior representative teams. In 1945, he represented the Illawarra U-12's and in 1947 was a part of the Australian Schoolboys team that played against a touring New Zealand Schoolboys side. He also represented NSW at the Interstate Carnival that year as well as in a tour of Victoria the following year.

In 1950, at 16 years of age, Learmonth joined his brothers at the North Wollongong Soccer Football Club who competed in the Illawarra District Association, winning every trophy that year.

=== Corrimal Rangers ===
In 1951, Corrimal Rangers won the signature of the prolific junior, beating out Balgownie Rangers FC and Woonona-Bulli SFC. Primarily deployed at inside forward, Learmonth scoured 17 goals and 14 goals in his first two seasons.

The 1954 season was an extremely successful one for Learmonth. With Corrimal, he won the State Premiership, State Cup and Sydney Cup. On a personal note, he was the top scorer across all competitions with 34 goals. The next best scorer was team-mate, Ted Drain with 23 goals.

Learmonth helped his team win the league double in 1955, securing the State Premiership and the Grand Challenge Final with an 11–3 win over Cessnock. Corrimal also won a third trophy, the Sydney Cup, with a 3–1 win over Auburn. Learmonth ended the season with 20 goals from 24 appearances. Team-mate Ron Burns was the top scorer across all competitions with 37 goals.

The 1957 Corrimal Rangers side was a very strong team, that did not quite fill its potential for the season. Learmonth scored 17 goals from 26 appearances in a forward line also consisting of Ron Burns (22 goals), Ted Drain (19 goals), Phil Peters (18 goals) and Warren Kerr (14 goals). The side was State Premiers but only managed runners-up in the Grand Challenge Final that year. Disappointingly, Learmonth could not help the side progress beyond Round 3 in the State Cup and Round 2 in the Sydney Cup.

=== Corrimal United ===
In 1958, Learmonth was among the group of players and committeemen from Corrimal Rangers that decided to compete in the breakaway league run by the NSW Federation of Soccer Clubs, forming the new club Corrimal United. This season was highly successful for the fledging club, winning the minor premiership at its first attempt. Learmonth was the league's top scorer with 25 goals. Unfortunately, Learmonth was unable to help his side win the Grand Final as the side lost both the major semi-final and the preliminary final to Canterbury-Marrickville and Auburn SFC respectively.

1959 was again another strong season for Learmonth and the Corrimal United club. After 26 regular season rounds, Corrimal finished in third place and Learmonth was the club's leading scorer with 19 goals. However an end of season form dip from the club continued into the finals series and they bowed out in the semi-finals, losing 2–4 to Sydney Hakoah. Learmonth played in every game except the Round 2 loss to Canterbury-Marrickville.

Learmonth played the first 19 rounds of the 1960 season, scoring 9 goals. However he was unable to complete the season after suffering ill health, attributed to a kidney issue which required removal. Upon medical advice after surgery, Learmonth retired from the game, aged 27.

== Representative career ==
=== Australia ===
Learmonth was the first player to represent Australia at the junior and senior level, competing in the Australian Schools and Australian under-15 sides against a touring team from New Zealand in 1947 before making his national senior debut at the Olympic Park Stadium in Melbourne against South Africa in 1955, earning him the cap number 136. Learmonth also played in 6 competitive matches for Australia in non-A internationals against club sides from Europe and Asia, including three matches against Rapid Vienna and one against South China in 1955, and one match each against Ferencvaros in 1957 and Heart of Midlothian in 1959.

=== Other representative matches ===
Learmonth also played in many representative games for his region and state, from his very first senior season with Corrimal Rangers in 1951. He would represent South Coast/Illawarra v England XI and The Rest in 1951, China in 1953 and 1956, New Zealand in 1954, Metropolis in 1955 and 1956, Rapid Vienna in 1955, FK Austria Vien in 1956, Hungary in 1956 and 1957 and Hearts in 1958. He would also play a representative fixture for Sydney against the touring England XI in 1953.

Learmonth would represent NSW against The Rest and New Zealand in 1953, at interstate carnivals in 1954 and 1956, against Rapid Vienna in 1955, and against Victoria and Queensland in 1956.

Learmonth was one of the most prominent strikers of the 1950's competing at the highest level of soccer in Australia with local clubs, Corrimal Rangers and Corrimal United in the NSW Soccer Football Association and the NSW Soccer Federation leagues.

In 1955, Learmonth represented his country, earning cap number 136 in his only full A-international match. However he also played further 6 matches in non-A internationals for Australia, scoring twice. He was the first player to represent Australia at junior and senior level.

Learmonth was a two time golden boot winner, ending the 1954 NSWSFA season with 34 goals and the 1958 NSWSF season with 25 league goals.

Unfortunately, Learmonth would suffer a career-ending injury during the 1960 season, retiring aged 27.

== Style of play ==
Learmonth was a tall and strong player with the ability to hold the ball up and play it off to team-mates. He had a good shot and was able to shoot with both left and right foot, a skill he credits to his brothers. Learmonth was initially deployed as an inside forward before moving to the centre-forward role. It is here that he would earn golden boot awards in the 1954 and 1958 seasons.

== Personal life ==
Learmonth was the younger of five brothers, who also all played soccer at high level. Elder brothers, Robert ("Bob"), Jack and Ron all represented the Illawarra during the 1940's at senior or underage levels. In the 1950 Illawarra District Soccer Association season, all four brothers played together in the first team at North Wollongong SFC.

== Playing statistics ==
=== Club ===
Appearances and goals by club, season and competition
Club	Season	League			State cup (Note: Includes Association State Cup (NSWSFA) and Federation Cup (NSWSF))		League cup (Note: Includes Sydney Cup (NSWSFA) and Ampol Cup (NSWSF))		Total	
Club	Season	Division	Apps	Goals	Apps	Goals	Apps	Goals	Apps	Goals
Corrimal Rangers	1951	NSWSFA State Premiership	?	?	—		—		27	17
Corrimal Rangers	1952	NSWSFA State Premiership	?	?	—		—		?	14
Corrimal Rangers	1953	NSWSFA State Premiership	?	?	—		—		?	?
Corrimal Rangers	1954	NSWSFA State Premiership	?	?	—		—		25	34
Corrimal Rangers	1955	NSWSFA State Premiership	?	?	—		—		24	20
Corrimal Rangers	1956	NSWSFA State Premiership	?	?	—		—		?	?
Corrimal Rangers	1957	NSWSFA State Premiership	?	?	—		—		26	17
Corrimal Rangers	Total		?	?	?	?	?	?	102+	102+
Corrimal United	1958	NSWSF First Division	23 (Note: 21 regular season matches#,2 finals matches)	25 (Note: 23 regular season goals, 2 finals goals)	1	? (Note: unknown goals, team total was 2.)	4	5	28	30
Corrimal United	1959	NSWSF First Division	26 (Note: 25 regular season matches, 1 finals match)	19 (Note: 19 regular season goals, unknown finals goals (team total was 2))	1	? (Note: unknown goals, team total was 1.)	4	? (Note: unknown goals, team total was 12.)	31	19
Corrimal United	1960	NSWSF First Division	19	9	0 (Note: season cut short due to kidney injury)	0	? (Note: unknown appearances, team played 1 match)	? (Note: unknown goals, team total was 2)	19	9
Corrimal United	Total		68	53	2	0	8	5	78	58
Career total			68+	53+	2+	0+	8+	5+	180+	160+

=== International ===
Appearances and goals by national team and year
National team	Year	Apps	Goals
Australia	1955	1	0

Appearances and goals by national team and year (non-A internationals)
National team	Year	Apps	Goals
Australia XI	1955	4	1
Australia XI	1956	0	0
Australia XI	1957	1	0
Australia XI	1958	0	0
Australia XI	1959	1	0
Total		6	1

== Honours ==
=== Player ===
Corrimal Rangers

- NSWSFA State Premiership: 1954, 1955, 1957
- NSWSFA State Premiership Grand Challenge Final: 1955
- NSWSFA State Cup: 1954
- NSWSFA Sydney Cup: 1954, 1955

Corrimal United

- NSW First Division minor premiership: 1958

Individual

- NSWSFA State Premiership golden boot: 1954
- NSWSF First Division golden boot: 1958

== See also ==
- List of Australia men's international soccer players
