= 1958 NSW Federation of Soccer Clubs season =

NSW Federation of Soccer Clubs
- Season: 1958
- Champions: Canterbury-Marrickville
- Premiers: Corrimal United

The 1958 NSW Federation of Soccer Clubs season was the second season of football in New South Wales under the administration of the federation since its breakaway from the NSW Soccer Football Association in January of 1957. The season once again kicked off with the preseason tournament in Lidcombe under lights, now jointly sponsored by Ampol and officially called the Ampol-Kennard Cup. The home and away league season began on the 5th of April with twelve teams, increasing its number by one this season. From the previous year, Eastern Suburbs withdrew and Lane Cove became North Side United. Corrimal United and Villawood were new entrants into the top tier. Once again a finals series was used decide the First Division champions of New South Wales in the format of a four team page playoff system. The season also held the second edition of the newly created Federation Cup.

Corrimal United were regular season premiers after twenty-two rounds of competition. Canterbury-Marrickville would avenge the previous season's grand final defeat by winning 2–1 over newly formed rivals Auburn at the ES Marks Athletics Field in front of a crowd of 8,840 to become the federation's second championship-winning team.

Hakoah were unable to back up their victory of the inaugural Ampol-Kennard Cup losing 3–4 to Canterbury-Marrickville in the final. Canterbury-Marrickville made it a treble winning season with a 3–2 win over Prague in the final of the Federation Cup.

== Clubs ==
Changes from last season

- Lane Cove became North Side United.
- Eastern Suburbs withdrew, leaving ten teams in the division.
- Villawood was promoted from Second Division and Corrimal United joined the federation after winning the Association First Division, creating twelve teams in the division.

Club	Ground	Colours	App	Debut	Last season
A.P.I.A.	Lambert Park, Leichhardt	Maroon	2nd	1957	9th
Auburn	Mona Park, Auburn	Green and Gold	2nd	1957	2nd, champions
Bankstown	Bankstown Oval, Bankstown	Green and Gold	2nd	1957	3rd, preliminary finalists
Canterbury	Arlington Oval, Dulwich Hill	Blue and Gold	2nd	1957	1st, runners-up
Corrimal United	Memorial Park, Corrimal	Red and White	1st	1958	1st in Association First Division
Concord	Concord Oval, Concord	Black	2nd	1957	10th
Gladesville-Ryde	Gladesville Sports Ground	Amber and Black	2nd	1957	4th, minor semi-finalists
Hakoah	Sydney Athletics Field, Moore Park	Sky Blue and White	2nd	1957	6th
North Side United	Chatswood Oval, Chatswood	Blue and Gold	2nd	1957	7th
Prague	Sydney Athletics Field, Moore Park	Sky Blue	2nd	1957	5th
Sydney Austral	Sydney Cricket Ground No. 2, Moore Park	Red, White and Blue	2nd	1957	8th
Villawood	Jensen Oval, Regent's Park	Green	1st	1957	1st in NSW Federation Second Division

== Ampol-Kennard Cup ==
The season began with this pre-season cup. Australian fuel company Ampol joined on as sponsors for this night competition, donating £500 as prize money for the series. The tournament was a straight knock-out competition run over six nights culminating with a final and third-place playoff matches. The aggregate of spectators for the tournament totalled 34,371.

First round
Sydney Austral	1
Canterbury (a.e.t.)	1
Concord	2
APIA Leichhardt	0
Villawood	1
Corrimal United	5
Auburn	2
North Side United	0

Second round
Prague	2
Gladesville Ryde	1
Canterbury	8
Concord	1
Hakoah	3
Bankstown	1
Corrimal United	4
Auburn	2

Semifinals
Prague	2
Canterbury	4
Hakoah	3
Corrimal United	2

Finals
Canterbury	4
Hakoah	3
Third place
Corrimal Utd (a.e.t.)	4
Prague	4

=== Round 1 ===
Canterbury	1–1	Sydney Austral	Lidcombe Oval, Lidcombe
Young	report	W. Vrolyks
Note: Canterbury advanced to the next round by winning corner kicks 1–0 in extra time.

Concord	2–0	APIA Leichhardt	Lidcombe Oval, Lidcombe
A. Bilbey 2	report

Corrimal United	5–1	Villawood	Lidcombe Oval, Lidcombe
R. Bignell; J. Beveridge; E. Drain; W. Kerr; K. Learmonth	report	H. Schaefer

Auburn	2–0	North Side United	Lidcombe Oval, Lidcombe
J. Knapp; Quested	report

=== Round 2 ===
Hakoah	3–1	Bankstown	Lidcombe Oval, Lidcombe
H. Schussig 2; C. Higgins	report	A. Smith

Prague	2–1	Gladesville-Ryde	Lidcombe Oval, Lidcombe
H. Vollman; M. Mueller	report	R. Foster

Corrimal	4–2	Auburn	Lidcombe Oval, Lidcombe
E. Drain 3; K. Learmonth	report	G. Edmond; Quested

Canterbury-Marrickville	8–1	Concord	Lidcombe Oval, Lidcombe
J. Moore 3; Young 2; W. Williams; R. Warren (o.g.); P. McAdam (o.g.)	report	J. Cusick

=== Semi-finals ===
Canterbury-Marrickville	4–2	Prague	Lidcombe Oval, Lidcombe
B. Salisbury 2; R. Neal 2	report	Baumgartner; K. Jaros

Hakoah	3–2	Corrimal	Lidcombe Oval, Lidcombe
H. Schussig 2; J. Forgacs	report	K. Learmonth; (o.g.) W. Walsh

=== Finals ===
2 April 1958 Third place playoff	Corrimal	4–4	Prague	Lidcombe Oval, Lidcombe
	K. Learmonth 2; E. Drain 2	report	Baumgartner 3; G. Geddes
Note: Corrimal won the match by winning corner kicks 4–0 in extra time.

2 April 1958 Final	Canterbury-Marrickville	4–3	Hakoah	Lidcombe Oval, Lidcombe
	B. Young 3; B. Salisbury	report	H. Schussig; C. Higgins; F. Hearn	Attendance: 8,028

== Federation Premiership ==
=== Table and results ===
Pos	Team	Pld	W	D	L	GF	GA	GD	Pts	Qualification or relegation
1	Corrimal United	22	17	2	3	69	29	+40	36	1958 Federation Finals
2	Canterbury-Marrickville (C)	22	14	3	5	66	31	+35	31	1958 Federation Finals
3	Auburn	22	13	5	4	55	35	+20	31	1958 Federation Finals
4	Prague	22	13	3	6	56	35	+21	29	1958 Federation Finals
5	Hakoah	22	12	4	6	57	39	+18	28	
6	Gladesville-Ryde	22	9	6	7	51	34	+17	24	
7	Bankstown	22	10	4	8	50	46	+4	24	
8	APIA	22	7	4	11	41	41	0	18	
9	Sydney Austral	22	8	1	13	38	51	−13	17	
10	North Side United	22	6	4	12	51	57	−6	16	
11	Concord	22	1	5	16	40	70	−30	7	
12	Villawood	22	1	1	20	14	120	−106	3	Relegation to NSW Federation of Soccer Clubs Division Two for next season.

Rules for classification: 1) points; 2) goal difference; 3) number of goals scored.
(C) Champions

=== Finals ===
Semi-finals
Major semi-final
1	Corrimal	1
2	Canterbury	3
Minor semi-final
3	Auburn	2
4	Prague	1

Final
1	Corrimal	4
3	Auburn (a.e.t.)	5

Grand Final
2	Canterbury-Marrickville	2
3	Auburn	1

==== Semi-finals ====
6 September 1958 Minor semi-final	Auburn	2–1	Prague	ES Marks Athletics Field, Sydney
	Quested 2	Report	M. Mueller

7 September 1958 Major semi-final	Canterbury-Marrickville	3–1	Corrimal	ES Marks Athletics Field, Sydney
	Watkiss; J. Moore; B. Salisbury	Report	K. Learmonth

==== Final ====
14 September 1958	Corrimal	4–5 (a.e.t.)	Auburn	ES Marks Athletics Field, Sydney
	W. Williams; R. Burns; K. Learmonth; E. Drain	Report	Quested 3; J. Knapp 2	Attendance: 6,617

==== Grand final ====
21 September 1958	Canterbury-Marrickville	2–1	Auburn	ES Marks Athletics Field, Sydney
	R. Neal; B. Young	Report	R. Hall	Attendance: 8,840

=== Fixtures and results ===
Home \ Away	API	AUB	BAN	CAN	CON	COR	GLR	HAK	NSU	PRA	SAU	VIL
APIA		2–3	0–2	5–0	2–2	2–0	1–5	1–1	2–2	1–3	1–0	7–0
Auburn	3–2		1–6	1–1	2–0	4–1	1–1	0–4	4–2	5–2	2–1	6–1
Bankstown	1–1	–		0–0	2–2	0–3	5–2	0–7	1–0	2–4	0–2	4–0
Canterbury-Marrickville	4–2	1–1	4–1		4–1	1–3	0–1	4–1	4–0	3–1	4–2	14–0
Concord	2–3	1–4	1–2	3–4		0–3	0–3	1–7	1–3	3–5	2–3	8–1
Corrimal United	1–0	0–0	1–2	1–0	6–3		2–1	3–3	7–3	2–1	2–1	8–2
Gladesville Ryde	3–2	2–2	5–1	0–1	2–1	1–2		3–4	3–1	1–1	2–3	4–2
Hakoah	3–0	0–1	1–6	3–1	2–2	1–4	2–0		7–3	2–2	1–4	2–0
North Side United	4–2	1–4	3–2	2–2	3–3	1–3	1–1	1–2		2–4	0–1	6–0
Prague	0–2	1–0	4–2	4–6	6–2	1–2	0–0	1–0	2–0		1–0	5–0
Sydney Austral	1–0	0–5	2–0	0–2	2–1	2–7	2–2	1–2	1–5	0–7		1–2
Villawood	1–3	1–4	0–4	0–5	1–1	0–7	0–9	1–2	1–8	0–1	1–2	

Legend: Blue = home team win; Yellow = draw; Red = away team win.

== Federation Cup ==
This was the second year contesting the Federation Cup

First round
Canterbury	7
Pan Hellenic	1
Concord	3
Corrimal	2
APIA Leichhardt	4
Villawood	1
Bankstown
Bye
Prague	4
St. George	0
Hakoah	3
Sydney Austral	1
Auburn	0
North Side United	1
Gladesville-Ryde	9
Polonia	0

Second round
Canterbury	4
Concord	3
APIA Leichhardt	3
Bankstown	2
Prague	3
Hakoah	0
North Side United	7
Gladesville-Ryde	1

Semifinals
Canterbury	5
APIA Leichhardt	2
Prague	5
North Side United	0

Finals
Canterbury	3
Prague	2

=== Semi-finals ===
24 August 1958	Canterbury-Marrickville	5–2	APIA Leichhardt	ES Marks Athletics Field, Sydney
	B. Young 2; R. Neal 2; B. Salisbury	Report	I. Vasvary; (o.g.) J. Curry

31 August 1958	Prague	5–0	North Side United	ES Marks Athletics Field, Sydney
	Baumgartner 2; K. Jaros 2; P. Jaksa	Report

=== Final ===
17 September 1958	Canterbury-Marrickville	3–2	Prague	Sydney Sports Ground, Sydney
	Watkiss; J. Moore; B. Young	Report	Baumgartner; V. Steozuk
