= 1964 NSW Federation Cup =

Tournament details
- Country: Australia (NSW)
- Teams: 24

Final positions
- Champions: Budapest-St. George
- Runners-up: South Coast United

Tournament statistics
- Matches played: 25

The 1964 NSW Federation Cup was the eighth edition of the NSW Soccer Federation's premier soccer cup. The federation offered £1000 prize money for the tournament to try attract more support which had been falling in previous years. It was also renamed the Henry Seamonds Trophy to commemorate the late Australian and NSW Federation president. The cup was open to all clubs in the first and second divisions for the first time. The Federation also decided that the winner of the cup would automatically qualify as a representative for the Australia Cup.

Sydney Hakoah were the defending champions, but were eliminated in a quarter-finals replay 4–3 by South Coast United.

The final was played on 27 September 1964 between Budapest-St. George and South Coast United, with Budapest winning the match 4–3 after extra time to claim their first Federation Cup title.

== Format and clubs ==
Round	Clubs remaining	Clubs advancing from previous round	New entries this round	Main match dates
First Round	24 → 20	N/A	8 clubs from NSW Second Division	from 29 February 1964
Second Round	20 → 16	4 winners from First Round	4 clubs from NSW Second Division	from 7 March 1964
Third Round	16 → 8	4 winners from Second Round	12 clubs from NSW First Division	from 11 March 1964
Quarter-finals	8 → 4	8 winners from Third Round	none	from 15 April 1964
Semi-finals	4 → 2	4 winners from quarter-finals	none	from 23 September 1964
Final	2 → 1	2 winners from semi-finals	none	27 September 1964

== First Round ==
Tie no.	Date	Team 1 (div.)	Score	Team 2 (div.)
1	29 February 1964	Blacktown-BSK (2)	5–3	Manly Warringah (2)
2	29 February 1964	Wollongong Olympic (2)	5–1	Sydney Austral (2)
3	1 March 1964	Sutherland Shire (2)	7–1	Western United (2)
4	1 March 1964	Polonia North-Side (2)	3–1	Thistle (2)

== Second Round ==
Concordia, Granville-AEK, Marconi and Melita Eagles enter the round after receiving a bye.

Tie no.	Date	Team 1 (div.)	Score	Team 2 (div.)
5	7 March 1964	Polonia-North Side (2)	3–2	Concordia (2)
6	7 March 1964	Granville AEK (2)	4–1	Sutherland Shire (2)
7	14 March 1964	Blacktown-BSK (2)	4–2	Marconi (2)
8	21 March 1964	Wollongong Olympic (2)	4–3	Melita Eagles (2)

== Third Round ==
First Division clubs enter this round.

Tie no.	Date	Team 1 (div.)	Score	Team 2 (div.)
9	11 March 1964	South Coast United (1)	4–2	Granville AEK (2)
10	11 March 1964	Hakoah Eastern Suburbs (1)	3–1	Canterbury-Marrickville (1)
11	18 March 1964	APIA Leichhardt (1)	5–3	Polonia-North Side (2)
12	18 March 1964	Yugal Ryde (1)	2–2	Bankstown (1)
replay	30 March 1964	Yugal Ryde (1)	1–2	Bankstown (1)
13	25 March 1964	Budapest-St. George (1)	4–0	Blacktown-BSK (2)
14	25 March 1964	Corinthian BESC (1)	3–1	Croatia Maroubra (1)
15	1 April 1964	Auburn (1)	4–1	Wollongong Olympic (2)
16	1 April 1964	Pan Hellenic (1)	1–0	Prague (1)

== Quarter-finals ==
15 April 1964	Pan Hellenic	2–1	Auburn
	D. Logan; B. Smith		J. Richardson	Attendance: 3,100; Referee: K. Lockrey

15 April 1964	Budapest-St. George	4–1	Corinthian BESC
	Vic Fernandez; Joe Vasvari		Pat Barnes	Attendance: 3,100; Referee: F. Sbisa

2 September 1964	APIA Leichhardt	5–2	Bankstown
	Watkiss; Giacometti; D. Falconer		B. Jarvis; C. Perkins	Attendance: 4,000; Referee: N. Jones

2 September 1964	Hakoah Eastern Suburbs	0–0 (a.e.t.)	South Coast United
				Attendance: 4,000; Referee: S. Pundyk

4 September 1964 replay	South Coast United	4–3	Hakoah Eastern Suburbs
	Barnett; Doherty; Mayers		Baumgartner; J. Christie; A. Marnock	Attendance: 1,500; Referee: S. Pundyk

== Semi-finals ==
23 September 1964	Budapest-St. George	6–5	Pan Hellenic	Redfern
	Galambos 47', 76', 104'; Fernandez 9'; G. Warren 42'; Zuckermann 98' (pen.)	Report	D. Logan 20', 41', 61', 89'; B. Smith 95'	Stadium: Redfern Oval; Attendance: 5,800; Referee: Anton Boskovic

23 September 1964	APIA Leichhardt	0–2	South Coast United	Redfern
		Report	Doherty 35'; Barnett 65'	Stadium: Redfern Oval; Attendance: 5,800; Referee: Stan Pundyk

== Final ==
Sunday, 27 September 1964

Budapest-St. George (1)	4–3	South Coast United (1)
J. Warren 55', 96'; G. Warren 46'; Galambos 8'	Report	Barnett 42', 61', 87'

Attendance: 3,700
Referee: Stan Pundyk

1	(Australia) Mel Clarke
2	(Australia) Salvador Isaac
3	(Australia) Tibor Zuckerman
4	(Germany) Manfred Schaefer
5	(Socialist Federal Republic of Yugoslavia) Petar Banicevic
6	(Argentina) Hugo Rodriguez
7	(England) Alf Stokes
8	(Australia) Johnny Warren
9	(Australia) Joe Galambos
10	(Argentina) Vic Fernandez
11	(Australia) Geoff Warren	Substituted off
Substitutes:
12	(Australia) Frank Lang	Substituted on
Coach:
(Romania) Miklos Szegedi

1	(England) Brian Rhodes
2	(Australia) Barry Salisbury
3	(Australia) Adrian Ringland
4	(England) Jimmy Kelly
5	(Australia) Jim Harris
6	(Australia) Casey De Bruyn
7	(Australia) Peter Beattie
8	(Australia) Cecil Sharpley
9	(Australia) John Doherty
10	(England) Graham Barnett
11	(England) Derek Mayers
Substitutes:
	none
Coach:
(England) Jimmy Kelly

NSW Federation Cup
1964 Champions

Budapest-St. George
First Title
