= 2001 National Soccer League grand final =

2001 National Soccer League Grand Final
- Event: 2000–01 National Soccer League
Wollongong Wolves	South Melbourne
2	1
- Date: 3 June 2001
- Venue: Parramatta Stadium, Sydney, Australia
- Man of the Match: Matt Horsley (Joe Marston Medal)
- Referee: Eddie Lennie
- Attendance: 13,402

The 2001 National Soccer League Grand Final was held on 3 June 2001 between Wollongong Wolves and South Melbourne at Parramatta Stadium. Soccer Australia deemed Wollongong's 14,000 capacity home ground WIN Stadium too small for the centrepiece of the NSL season. Ironically the crowd attendance was 13,402. Wollongong won the match 2–1, with two goals in as many minutes from Sasho Petrovski and Stuart Young putting them ahead. Although John Anastasiadis got a goal for South Melbourne, it wasn't enough. This won the Wolves their second consecutive National Soccer League championship and their second overall. Matt Horsley won the Joe Marston Medal.

== Route to the Final ==
As top-two finishers, South Melbourne and Wollongong Wolves were placed into the second week of the final series, with the winner to host the grand final. Wollongong won both legs 2–1 to qualify for the grand final with a 4–2 aggregate. In the preliminary final, South Melbourne defeated fourth-placed Sydney Olympic to qualify for the final.

Soccer Australia chose Parramatta Stadium as the grand final venue, expecting a larger crowd than the WIN Stadium could hold.

The Soccer Australia board initially refused an offer from the Seven Network to show the match live on free-to-air television. The board intended for the match to be played at 3pm, however Seven had pre-existing Australian Football League (AFL) commitments. Eventually, the board changed the time to midday and Seven showed the match live outside of Sydney.

=== League Standings ===
Pos	Team	Pld	W	D	L	GF	GA	GD	Pts	Qualification
1	South Melbourne	30	21	6	3	70	24	+46	69	Qualification for the Finals series
2	Wollongong Wolves (C)	30	18	7	5	80	40	+40	61	Qualification for the Finals series
3	Perth Glory	30	18	7	5	73	33	+40	61	Qualification for the Finals series
4	Sydney Olympic	30	17	6	7	58	37	+21	57	Qualification for the Finals series
5	Marconi Fairfield	30	14	8	8	42	33	+9	50	Qualification for the Finals series
6	Melbourne Knights	30	14	7	9	61	46	+15	49	Qualification for the Finals series
7	Adelaide Force	30	12	7	11	54	54	0	43	
8	Football Kingz	30	12	7	11	52	52	0	43	
9	Parramatta Power	30	13	3	14	42	44	−2	42	
10	Sydney United	30	12	6	12	46	56	−10	42	
11	Canberra Cosmos	30	11	4	15	49	55	−6	37	
12	Brisbane Strikers	30	9	8	13	52	56	−4	35	
13	Northern Spirit	30	8	8	14	39	50	−11	32	
14	Newcastle United	30	7	9	14	37	56	−19	30	
15	Eastern Pride	30	5	5	20	32	61	−29	0 (Note: Eastern Pride were stripped of all their points following a breach of regulations.)	
16	Carlton	30	0	0	30	0	90	−90	0 (Note: Carlton withdrew after eight rounds. All games against them were awarded 3–0.)	Withdrew

Source: rsssf.com
Rules for classification: 1) Points; 2) Goal difference; 3) Goals scored
(C) Champions

=== Finals Bracket ===
Elimination finals
6	Melbourne Knights (a)	0	2	2
3	Perth Glory	0	2	2
4	Sydney Olympic	3	2	5
5	Marconi Fairfield	1	0	1

Major/Minor semifinals
2	Wollongong Wolves	2	2	4
1	South Melbourne	1	1	2
6	Melbourne Knights	0
4	Sydney Olympic	1

Preliminary final
1	South Melbourne	2
4	Sydney Olympic	0

Grand Final
3 June 2001
Wollongong Wolves	2
South Melbourne	1

== Match ==
=== Details ===
3 June 2001
AEST

Wollongong Wolves	2 – 1	South Melbourne
Petrovski 56'; Young 57'	Reports	Anastasiadis 78'

Parramatta Stadium, Sydney
Attendance: 13,402
Referee: Eddie Lennie

GK	26	(Australia) Dean Anastasiadis
DF	2	(Australia) George Sounis
DF	3	(Australia) Alvin Ceccoli	(yellow card) 79'
DF	5	(Australia) David Cervinski
MF	6	(Australia) Matt Horsley (c)
MF	7	(Australia) Paul Reid
FW	9	(Australia) Sasho Petrovski		(substituted off) 73'
FW	10	(England) Stuart Young
MF	15	(Australia) David Huxley
DF	17	(Australia) Ben Blake
MF	27	(Australia) Robbie Middleby		(substituted off) 90+1'
Substitutes:
GK	1	(Australia) Daniel Beltrame
DF	4	(Australia) Robert Stanton		(substituted on) 73'
MF	8	(England) Max Nicholson
FW	14	(Australia) Jay Lucas
MF	23	(Australia) Dino Mennillo		(substituted on) 90+1'
Manager:
(Australia) Ron Corry
Joe Marston Medal:
Matt Horsley (Wollongong Wolves)

GK	1	(Australia) Michael Petkovic
MF	2	(Australia) Steve Iosifidis	(yellow card) 36'	(substituted off) 71'
DF	3	(Australia) Fausto De Amicis (c)	(yellow card) 89'
DF	4	(Australia) Mehmet Durakovic
MF	7	(Australia) Steve Panopoulos
FW	8	(New Zealand) Vaughan Coveny
MF	10	(Australia) Con Boutsianis
FW	13	(Australia) Andrew Vlahos
FW	14	(Australia) Vas Kalogeracos		(substituted off) 65'
DF	16	(Australia) Zeljko Susa		(substituted off) 65'
DF	25	(Australia) Simon Colosimo
Substitutes:
GK	20	(Australia) Chris Jones
MF	6	(Australia) David Clarkson
FW	9	(Australia) Paul Trimboli		(substituted on) 65'
FW	11	(Australia) John Anastasiadis		(substituted on) 71'
MF	15	(Australia) Goran Lozanovski		(substituted on) 65'
Manager:
(Australia) Mike Petersen

Assistant referees:
Fourth official:

Match rules

- 90 minutes.
- 30 minutes of extra time if necessary.
- Penalty shoot-out if scores still level.
