= 1962 NSW Federation Cup =

Craven A Cup

Tournament details
- Country: Australia (NSW)
- Teams: 16

Final positions
- Champions: APIA Leichhardt
- Runners-up: Canterbury-Marrickville

Tournament statistics
- Matches played: 19
- Goals scored: 78 (4.11 per match)
- Top goal scorer: John Giacometti (8 goals)

The 1962 NSW Federation Cup was the sixth edition of the NSW Soccer Federation's premier soccer cup. With a £1000 first place prize money, the tournament was sponsored by W.D. & H.O. Wills and called the "Craven A Cup" after their popular cigarette. The cup was contested by all twelve first division clubs and four second division clubs, Balgownie, Corinthians, Croatia and Sydney Austral.

Sydney Hakoah were the defending champions, having beaten Canterbury-Marrickville 2–0 in last year's final. They were eliminated in the first round by an avenged Canterbury-Marrickville.

The final was played on 4 November 1962 between APIA Leichhardt and Canterbury-Marrickville. APIA won the match 5–1 and to claim their first title. As part of a double header, Gladesville-Ryde beat Budapest, also to a scoreline of 5–1 to claim third place.

== Format and clubs ==
Round	Clubs remaining	Clubs advancing from previous round	New entries this round	Main match dates
First Round	16	N/A	12 clubs from NSW First Division; 4 clubs from NSW Second Division	28 Sep–17 Oct 1962
Quarter-finals	8	8 winners from First Round	none	10–20 Oct 1962
Semi-finals	4	4 winners from quarter-finals	none	27 Oct 1962
Third place playoff and Final	4	2 losers from semi-finals enter Third place playoff; 2 winners from semi-finals enter Final	none	4 Nov 1962

== First Round ==
Date	Team 1 (div.)	Score	Team 2 (div.)	Location	Crowd	Referee
28 September 1962	South Coast United (1)	3–3	Corinthians (2)	Sydney Athletics Field	1,050	D. Buchan
28 September 1962	Prague (1)	1–1	Auburn (1)	Sydney Athletics Field	1,050	K. Lockrey
30 September 1962	Bankstown (1)	1–0	Balgownie (2)	Wentworth Park	4,800	L. Wilson
30 September 1962	A.P.I.A. (1)	3–0	Croatia (2)	Wentworth Park	4,800	R. Pearce
5 October 1962	Budapest (1)	1–0	Sydney Austral (2)	Sydney Athletics Field	2,400	I. Timms
5 October 1962	Hakoah (1)	0–0	Canterbury-Marrickville (1)	Sydney Athletics Field	2,400	N. Jones
7 October 1962	Yugal (1)	4–1	Polonia-North Side (1)	Wentworth Park	4,400	J. Ipenburg
7 October 1962	Gladesville-Ryde (1)	3–2	Pan Hellenic (1)	Wentworth Park	4,400	A. Boskovic
16 October 1962 (‡)	Canterbury-Marrickville (1)	4–2	Hakoah (1)	Sydney Athletics Field	1,500	F. Sbisa
17 October 1962 (‡)	South Coast United (1)	4–1	Corinthians (2)	Sydney Athletics Field	1,200	K. Lockrey
17 October 1962 (‡)	Prague (1)	5–1	Auburn (1)	Sydney Athletics Field	1,200	D. Buchan

* (‡): Match replayed

== Finals ==
Quarterfinals
Budapest	3
Yugal	0
A.P.I.A.	4
Bankstown	1
Gladesville-Ryde	3
Prague	0
Canterbury-Marrickville	3
South Coast Utd	2

Semifinals
Budapest	1
A.P.I.A.	3
Gladesville-Ryde	2
Canterbury-Marrickville	4

Final
A.P.I.A.	5
Canterbury-Marrickville	1
Third place
Budapest	1
Gladesville-Ryde	5

=== Quarter-finals ===
12 October 1962

Budapest	3–0	Yugal
J. Medina (2); Schauman

Sydney Athletics Field, Kensington, Sydney
Attendance: 4,200
Referee: Keith Lockrey
12 October 1962

APA Leichhardt	4–1	Bankstown
Giacometti (3); Bottalico		Smit

Sydney Athletics Field, Kensington, Sydney
Attendance: 4,200
Referee: Roy Pearce
20 October 1962

Gladesville-Ryde	3–0	Prague
J. McCann (2); Baker

Wentworth Park, Glebe, Sydney
Attendance: 2,700
Referee: Norm Jones
20 October 1962

Canterbury-Marrickville	3–2	South Coast United
Watkiss (2); A. Westwater		D. Patterson; Pat Woods

Wentworth Park, Glebe, Sydney
Attendance: 2,700
Referee: Tony Boskovic

=== Semi-finals ===
27 October 1962

Canterbury-Marrickville	4–2	Gladesville-Ryde
Yaager; Watkiss; C. Lorenzo; P. Keen (o.g.)		J. McCann; D. Folwell

Wentworth Park, Glebe
Attendance: 5,700
Referee: Frank Sbisa
27 October 1962

APIA Leichhardt	3–1	Budapest
Giacometti (3)		Schauman

Wentworth Park, Glebe
Attendance: 5,700
Referee: Roy Pearce

=== Third place playoff ===
4 November 1962

Gladesville-Ryde	5–1	Budapest
B. Lewsham (3); Ron Baker (2)		Schauman

Wentworth Park, Glebe
Attendance: 8,600
Referee: John Ipenburg

=== Final ===
4 November 1962

APIA Leichhardt	5–1	Canterbury-Marrickville
Giacometti (2); Hunter; Morrow; John Curry (o.g.)		Watkiss

Wentworth Park, Glebe
Attendance: 8,600
Referee: Frank Sbisa

1	(Australia) Norm Hobson
2	(Australia) Cliff Van Blerk
3	(Australia) Nick Cosettini
4	(Australia) Pat Hughes
5	(Australia) Joe Marston
6	(Australia) Doug Fagan
7	(Australia) Robert Hunter
8	(Austria) Leo Baumgartner
9	(Australia) Bruce Morrow
10	(Australia) Phil Bottalico
11	(Australia) John Giacometti
Manager:
(Austria) Leo Baumgartner

1	(Australia) R. Corrie
2	(Australia) J. Dougan
3	(Australia) D. Feggans
4	(Australia) I. O'Reilly
5	(Australia) John Curry
6	(Australia) G. Campbell
7	(Australia) W. Travers
8	(Australia) A. Westwater
9	(Australia) Johnny Watkiss
10	(Australia) C. Lorenzo
11	(Australia) Barry Salisbury
Manager:

NSW Federation Cup
1962 Champions

APIA Leichhardt FC
First Title
