= 1959 NSW Federation Cup =

Ascot Thousand

Tournament details
- Country: Australia (NSW)
- Teams: 16

Final positions
- Champions: Sydney Hakoah
- Runners-up: Prague

Tournament statistics
- Matches played: 17
- Goals scored: 80 (4.71 per match)

The 1959 NSW Federation Cup was the third edition of the NSW Soccer Federation's premier soccer cup. This was the first time the tournament received sponsorship by W.D. & H.O. Wills and called the "Ascot Thousand" after their popular cigarette. The cup was contested by all fourteen first division clubs and the top two placed second division clubs in the premiership. The £1000 prize money was divided among the first four placings, with first place receiving £600, second place £250, third place £100 and fourth place £50.

Canterbury-Marrickville were the defending champions, having beaten Sydney Prague 3–2 in last year's final. They were eliminated in the semi-finals but won the third place playoff match, defeating Budapest 5–2.

The final was played on 25 October 1959 between Sydney Prague and Sydney Hakoah. Hakoah won the match 2–0 to claim their first title.

== Format and clubs ==
| Round | Clubs remaining | Clubs advancing from previous round | New entries this round | Main match dates |
|---|---|---|---|---|
| First Round | 16 | N/A | 14 clubs from NSW First Division; 2 clubs from NSW Second Division | 16–30 Sep 1959 |
| Quarter-finals | 8 | 8 winners from First Round | none | 10–11 Oct 1959 |
| Semi-finals | 4 | 4 winners from quarter-finals | none | 18 Oct 1959 |
| Third place playoff and Final | 4 | 2 losers from semi-finals enter Third place playoff; 2 winners from semi-finals enter Final | none | 25 Oct 1959 |

== First Round ==
| Tie | Team 1 (div.) | Score | Team 2 (div.) | Kick-off | Date | Venue |
|---|---|---|---|---|---|---|
| 1 | Prague (1) | 9–3 | Granville AEK (2) | 19:15 AEST | 16 September 1959 | Sydney Sports Ground |
| 2 | Corrimal United (1) | 1–2 | Budapest (1) | 20:55 AEST | 16 September 1959 | Sydney Sports Ground |
| 3 | Hakoah (1) | 2–2 | Balgownie (1) | 19:15 AEST | 23 September 1959 | Sydney Sports Ground |
| 4 | A.P.I.A. (1) | 3–0 | North Side United (1) | 20:55 AEST | 23 September 1959 | Sydney Sports Ground |
| 5 | Neerlandia (2) | 2–5 | Sydney Austral (1) | 13:15 AEST | 26 September 1959 | Arlington Oval |
| 6 | Canterbury-Marrickville (1) | 6–1 | Concord (1) | 15:00 AEST | 26 September 1959 | Arlington Oval |
| 7 | Auburn (1) | 2–1 | Pan Hellenic (1) | 13:15 AEST | 26 September 1959 | McArthur Park |
| 8 | Gladesville-Ryde (1) | 2–0 | Bankstown (1) | 15:00 AEST | 26 September 1959 | McArthur Park |
| replay | Hakoah (1) | 5–2 | Balgownie Rangers (1) | | 30 September 1959 | |

== Finals ==
=== Quarter-finals ===
10 October 1959
13:15 AEST (UTC+10:00)

| Budapest | 3–0 | Sydney Austral |

Redfern Oval, Redfern
10 October 1959
15:00 AEST (UTC+10:00)

| Prague | 1–0 | Gladesville-Ryde |

Redfern Oval, Redfern
11 October 1959
13:15 AEST (UTC+10:00)

| Hakoah | 4–0 | Auburn |

Redfern Oval, Redfern
11 October 1959
15:00 AEST (UTC+10:00)

| Canterbury-Marrickville | 2–1 | APIA Leichhardt |

Redfern Oval, Redfern

=== Semi-finals ===
18 October 1959
14:00 AEST (UTC+10:00)

| Prague | 4–0 | Budapest |

Redfern Oval, Redfern
18 October 1959
15:45 AEST (UTC+10:00)

| Hakoah | 3–2 | Canterbury-Marrickville |

Redfern Oval, Redfern

=== Third place playoff ===
25 October 1959
14:00 AEST (UTC+10:00)

| Budapest | 2–5 | Canterbury-Marrickville |

Redfern Oval, Redfern
Attendance: 10,500
Referee: H. Parsons

=== Final ===
25 October 1959
15:45 AEST (UTC+10:00)

| Prague | 0–2 | Hakoah |

Redfern Oval, Redfern
Attendance: 10,500
Referee: Roy Pearce

NSW Federation Cup
1959 Champions

Sydney Hakoah
First Title
