= 1957 NSW Federation of Soccer Clubs season =

NSW Federation of Soccer Clubs
- Season: 1957
- Champions: Auburn
- Premiers: Canterbury-Marrickville
- Best Player: Len Quested

The 1957 NSW Federation of Soccer Clubs season was the inaugural season of football in New South Wales under the administration of the federation since its breakaway from the NSW Soccer Football Association in January 1957. The season officially kicked off with the William Kennard Cup, a pre-season tournament held in Lidcombe under lights, a novelty for the time. This was the precursor to the highly successful Ampol Cup which sponsored similar cups in other federations throughout Australia. The home and away league season began in April with ten teams until Gladesville-Ryde joined after five rounds. The campaign was then rescheduled to accommodate and it also consisted of a finals series to decide the Division One champions of New South Wales. The season also held the first ever competition of the newly created Federation Cup.

Canterbury-Marrickville were regular season premiers after twenty rounds of competition. Auburn however defeated Canterbury-Marrickville 4–3 in the dying stages of the grand final at the Sydney Sports Ground in front of a crowd of 8,440 to become the federation's first ever champions.

Hakoah were the inaugural champions of the William Kennard Cup and Canterbury-Marrickville backed up their regular season premiership with a 4–2 win over Gladesville-Ryde in the final of the Federation Cup.

== Clubs ==
Club	Ground	Colours	App
APIA	Lambert Park, Leichhardt	Maroon	1st
Auburn	Mona Park, Auburn	Green and Gold	1st
Bankstown	Bankstown Oval, Bankstown	Green and Gold	1st
Canterbury	Arlington Oval, Dulwich Hill	Blue and Gold	1st
Concord	Concord Oval, Concord	Black	1st
Eastern Suburbs	?	?	1st
Gladesville-Ryde	Gladesville Sports Ground	Amber and Black	1st
Hakoah	Sydney Athletics Field, Moore Park	Sky Blue and White	1st
Lane Cove	Chatswood Oval, Chatswood	Blue and Gold	1st
Prague	Sydney Athletics Field, Moore Park	Sky Blue	1st
Sydney Austral	Sydney Cricket Ground No. 2	Red, White and Blue	1st

== William Kennard Cup ==
This tournament was a pre-season cup and first official tournament of the newly created federation. It made use of night matches, the first of its kind for any code in Australia.

=== Preliminary Rounds ===
Team 1	Score	Team 2
Sydney Austral	2–1	Auburn
Hakoah	3–1	APIA
Lane Cove	2–1	Bankstown
Sydney Austral	3–0	Prague

=== Finals ===
Semi-finals
Sydney Austral	1
Lane Cove	1
Canterbury-Marrickville	4
Hakoah	5

Grand Final
Lane Cove	1
Hakoah	5

Semi-final	Hakoah	5–4	Canterbury-Marrickville	Lidcombe Oval, Lidcombe
	C. Higgins 3; H. Schussig 2; F. Hearn	Report	K. Phillip 2; B. Young; D. Brown

Semi-final	Lane Cove	1–1 (a.e.t.)	Sydney Austral	Lidcombe Oval, Lidcombe
	C. Bowley	Report	K. Pronk
Note: Lane Cove advanced through corner kicks in extra time (2–0).

Final	Hakoah	5–1	Lane Cove	Lidcombe Oval, Lidcombe
	C. Higgins 2; H. Schussig 2; F. Hearn	Report	C. Bowley

== Federation Premiership ==
=== Table and results ===
Pos	Team	Pld	W	D	L	GF	GA	GD	Pts	Qualification or relegation
1	Canterbury-Marrickville	20	14	2	4	76	30	+46	30	1957 Federation Finals
2	Auburn (C)	20	13	4	3	53	30	+23	30	1957 Federation Finals
3	Bankstown	20	13	3	4	56	26	+30	29	1957 Federation Finals
4	Gladesville Ryde	20	9	6	5	48	34	+14	24	1957 Federation Finals
5	Prague	20	11	2	7	58	45	+13	24	
6	Hakoah	20	9	3	8	42	30	+12	21	
7	Lane Cove	20	7	5	8	38	45	−7	19	
8	Sydney Austral	20	7	4	9	37	41	−4	18	
9	APIA	20	3	4	13	39	57	−18	10	
10	Concord	20	4	2	14	30	75	−45	10	
11	Eastern Suburbs	20	1	3	16	24	88	−64	5	Team withdrew at end of season.

Source: Wayback Machine SoccerAust
Rules for classification: 1) points; 2) goal difference; 3) number of goals scored.
(C) Champions

=== Finals ===
Semi-finals
Major semi-final
1	Canterbury-Marrickville	1
2	Auburn	2
Minor semi-final
3	Bankstown	3
4	Gladesville-Ryde	2

Final
2	Canterbury-Marrickville	7
3	Bankstown	1

Grand Final
1	Auburn	4
2	Canterbury-Marrickville	3

==== Semi-finals ====
7 September 1957 Minor semi-final	Bankstown	3–2	Gladesville-Ryde	Arlington Oval, Dulwich Hill
	P. Stone; C. Miller; J. Buchan	Report	L. Quested 2	Attendance: 3,281

8 September 1957 Major semi-final	Canterbury-Marrickville	1–2	Auburn	Arlington Oval, Dulwich Hill
	K. Barnett	Report	L. Quested 2	Attendance: 5,487

==== Final ====
14 September 1957	Canterbury-Marrickville	7–1	Bankstown	Arlington Oval, Dulwich Hill
	B. Young; R. Neal; D. Brown; W. Westwater; R. Madden (o.g.)	Report	A. Smith	Attendance: 5,643

==== Grand final ====
22 September 1957	Auburn	4–3	Canterbury-Marrickville	Sydney Sports Ground, Sydney
	A. Henderson; L. Quested; A. McAlister; R. Parkinson (o.g.)	Report	R. Neal; W. Westwater; B. Young	Attendance: 8,440

=== Fixtures and results ===
Home \ Away	API	AUB	BAN	CAN	CON	EST	GLR	HAK	LAC	PRA	SAU
APIA		2–4	1–2	1–3	4–0	2–3	1–1	2–4	2–2	4–6	0–2
Auburn	3–1		4–1	1–7	3–1	7–0	1–1	3–2	5–3	0–1	1–3
Bankstown	1–0	1–1		2–3	8–0	3–2	0–0	2–0	4–0	4–3	3–2
Canterbury-Marrickville	5–1	0–2	1–1		1–0	7–0	2–4	3–2	5–1	1–2	3–1
Concord	2–3	2–5	2–5	0–8		3–2	1–4	2–6	5–3	2–6	0–1
Eastern Suburbs	2–5	2–2	2–9	0–7	1–2		3–7	2–2	0–2	1–5	1–3
Gladesville Ryde	2–2	0–1	2–5	0–7	4–3	4–1		3–1	1–0	2–0	2–0
Hakoah	4–0	0–0	1–0	1–4	5–0	4–0	3–0		1–2	1–2	2–1
Lane Cove	4–1	0–3	1–3	3–3	2–3	1–1	2–2	1–2		3–2	2–0
Prague	4–3	1–2	1–0	3–5	2–2	7–1	6–2	1–0	1–3		3–3
Sydney Austral	3–3	2–5	0–2	1–5	2–2	4–1	2–0	1–1	1–3	5–2	

Source: Official Federation Soccer Yearbook 1958 via ozfootball.net
Legend: Blue = home team win; Yellow = draw; Red = away team win.

== Federation Cup ==
This was the first year contesting the Federation Cup

Quarterfinals
Gladesville-Ryde	2
A.P.I.A.	1
Concord	3
Prague	5
Canterbury-Marrickville	2
Hakoah	0
Bankstown	4
Eastern Suburbs	0

Semifinals
Gladesville-Ryde	2
Prague	1
Canterbury-Marrickville	4
Bankstown	1

Final
Canterbury-Marrickville	4
Gladesville-Ryde	2

Source: Wayback Machine SoccerAust
