= David Edwards (rugby union, born 1930) =

Scottish rugby union player (1930–2006)

- Born: David Baxter Edwards; 19 March 1930 Edinburgh, Scotland
- Died: 8 July 2006 (aged 76) Edinburgh
- School: George Heriot's School

Rugby union career
- Position: Flanker
Amateur team(s)
Years	Team	Apps	(Points)
- Heriot's
–	Birkenhead Park FC		
Provincial / State sides
Years	Team	Apps	(Points)
- Edinburgh District
International career
Years	Team	Apps	(Points)
1960-1960	Scotland	03	(15)

David Edwards (19 March 1930 – 8 July 2006) was a former Scotland international rugby union player.

== Rugby career ==
=== Amateur career ===
Edwards started his rugby playing while at George Heriot's School. Joining the RAF as part of his National Service he moved to Merseyside. While there he played for Birkenhead Park FC. Upon his return to Edinburgh he joined his school's "Former Pupils" team of Heriot's. Edwards played his career here, later becoming captain and then president in the years to follow. Iain Milne described Edwards as an "uncompromising back row"

=== Rugby sevens ===
During sevens, he played with Heriot's.

Winning:

- Langholm Sevens (1954)
- Melrose Sevens (1954,1957,1958)
- Hawick Sevens (1954)
- Jed-Forest Sevens (1955,1958)
- Peebles Sevens (1953,1958)
- Walkerburn Sevens (1953,1954)
- Murrayfield Sevens (1954,1955,1956,1958)

=== Provincial career ===
Whilst with Heriot's he played for Edinburgh District. He played in the 1955–56 Scottish Inter-District Championship season that was decided in the final game versus Glasgow District

It would be four years until Edwards would be selected to play for Edinburgh District again in the 1959-60 season. This time his performances on the pitch would lead to a selection in the Scotland team.

On 16 November 1960 a combined Glasgow-Edinburgh District side faced the touring South Africa squad. Edwards captained the side losing 16-11, in the process he got badly injured but came back on. In the days that followed the injuries forced him to retire at the age of 30.

=== International career ===
After Edwards's performances in the 1959–60 Scottish Inter-District Championship he was selected to "lead the pack" against Ireland only a matter of 3 weeks before his 30th birthday. The match ended in a 6–5 victory to Scotland with Edwards scoring an unconverted try and 5 minutes later Ken Scotland landing a "neat drop goal". This was Scotland's first victory in Ireland for 27 years. On Edwards 30th Birthday he played England in what would be a 21–12 defeat.

In the April of 1960 Scotland went on the first visit to the Southern Hemisphere by a single home nation and the first short tour by any Test team by going to South Africa. Edwards third and final cap came in this test game which they lost 18–10. Four days later Edwards scored a try versus Griqualand West now known as the Griquas in Kimberley.
