= Abermeurig =

Village in Ceredigion, Wales

Coordinates: 52°11′19″N 4°06′04″W

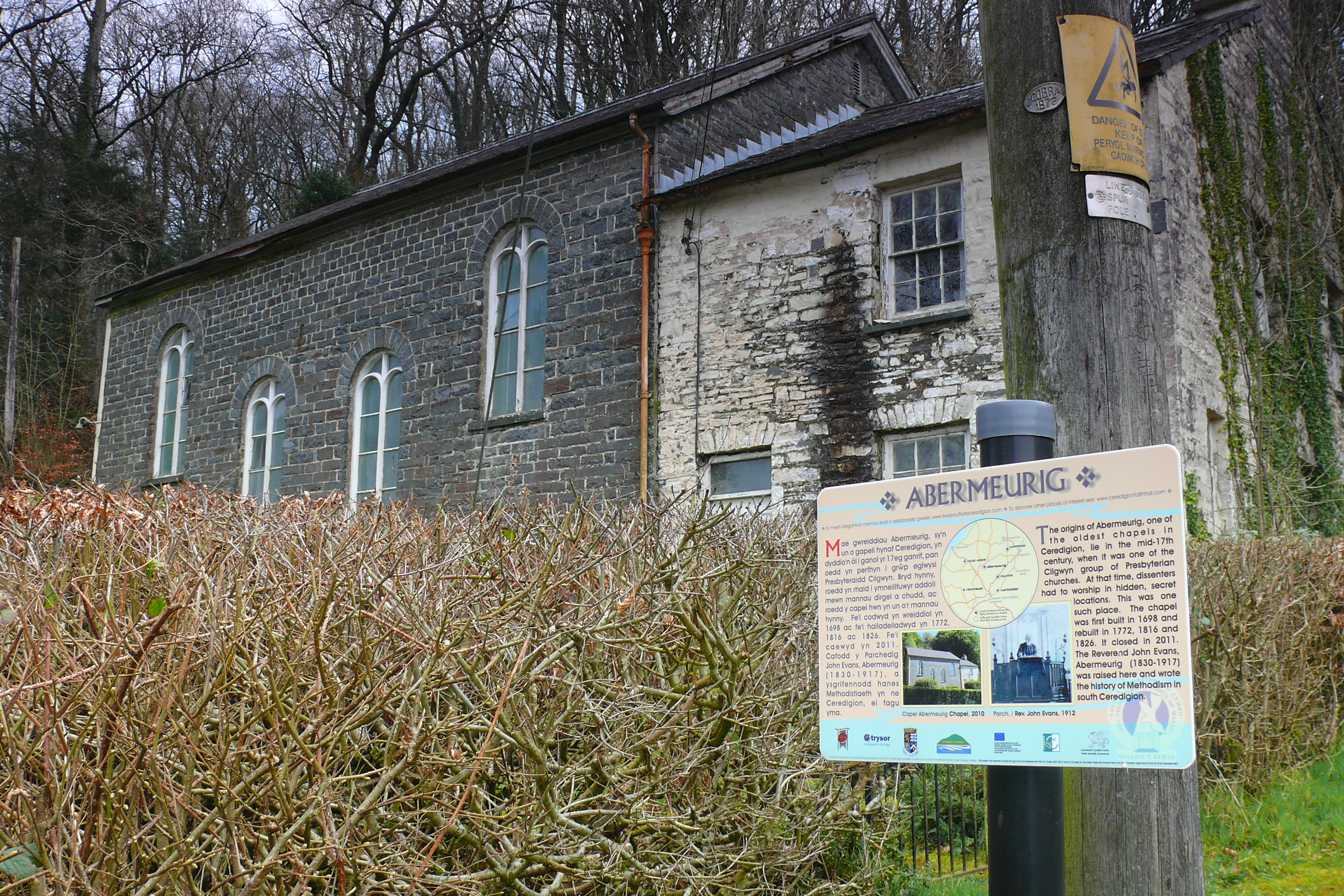
Abermeurig Methodist Chapel

Abermeurig (also spelt Aber-meurig) is a small village in the county of Ceredigion, Wales.

The village is home to a former Methodist chapel, first built in 1698. It was rebuilt 1772, 1816, 1826 and 1890.

== Notable people ==
- David Edwards (minister) (1660–1716)
