= Derek Mayers =

English footballer

Personal information
- Full name: Derek Mayers
- Date of birth: 24 January 1935
- Place of birth: Liverpool, England
- Date of death: 15 April 2016 (aged 81)
- Place of death: Wigan, England
- Position: Winger

Senior career*
Years	Team	Apps	(Gls)
1952–1957	Everton	18	(7)
1957–1961	Preston North End	118	(25)
1961–1962	Leeds United	20	(5)
1962–1963	Bury	32	(6)
1963–1964	Wrexham	21	(2)
1964	Rhyl		
1964–1965	South Coast United		
- * Club domestic league appearances and goals as of 19:13, 11 March 2018 (UTC)

Derek Mayers (24 January 1935 – 15 April 2016) was an English footballer, who played as a winger. He played in the English Football League First Division (at the time the top level of English football) for Everton and Preston North End.

== Career ==
Mayers began his career at Everton, being signed straight from school to play for the club. He made his debut in the 1952–53 season, before being called up to do his National Service during the following season, where he represented the army team.

Mayers returned to Everton following National Service, and transferred to Preston North End in 1957, where he helped them finish second in the 1957–58 Football League First Division. He made over 100 appearances for the club.

After Preston's relegation from the First Division in 1961, Mayers transferred to Leeds United, where he remained for a year.

Then he played for Bury and Wrexham in the football league.

He later played for Rhyl in the League of Wales and spent 18 months at South Coast United in Australia.

== Death ==
Mayers died on 15 April 2016 at the age of 81 in Wigan, Greater Manchester.
