= 1959–60 Scottish Inter-District Championship =

Rugby union competition

- Countries: Scotland
- Date: 1959–60
- Champions: South / North and Midlands / Edinburgh
- Runners-up: Glasgow District
- Matches played: 6

The 1959–60 Scottish Inter-District Championship was a rugby union competition for Scotland's district teams.

This season saw the seventh formal Scottish Inter-District Championship.

South, North and Midlands and Edinburgh District won the competition with two wins and a loss each.

Glasgow's 32 - 0 loss to the South led to calls for the Glasgow District to be partitioned into Glasgow (northwards to Stirling) as a 'city' team and a South-West district (Renfrewshire and Ayrshire to Stranraer and Wigtownshire).

== 1959-60 League Table ==
Team	P	W	D	L	PF	PA	+/-	Pts
South	3	2	0	1	58	22	+36	4
North and Midlands	3	2	0	1	32	23	+9	4
Edinburgh District	3	2	0	1	31	35	-4	4
Glasgow District	3	0	0	3	14	55	-41	0

== Results ==
Date	Try	Conversion	Penalty	Dropped goal	Goal from mark	Notes
1948–1970	3 points	2 points	3 points	3 points	3 points	

=== Round 1 ===
24 October 1959

South	32 – 0	Glasgow District
	Preview; Report

Philiphaugh Stadium, Selkirk
Referee: H. W. Leach (Aberdeenshire)

South:
Glasgow District:

=== Round 2 ===
7 November 1959

South	14 – 9	North and Midlands
	Preview; Score

Riverside Park, Jedburgh

South:
North and Midlands:

=== Round 3 ===
21 November 1959

North and Midlands	12 – 6	Edinburgh District
	Preview; Report

Linksfield Stadium, Aberdeen
Referee: R. P. Burrell (Gala)

North and Midlands:
Edinburgh District:

=== Round 4 ===
5 December 1959

Glasgow District	11 – 12	Edinburgh District
	Preview; Report

Hughenden Stadium

Glasgow District:
Edinburgh District:

=== Round 5 ===
16 January 1960

Edinburgh District	13 – 12	South
	Preview; Report

Murrayfield Stadium

Edinburgh District:
South:

=== Round 6 ===
13 February 1960

Glasgow District	3 – 11	North and Midlands
	Preview; Report

Murrayfield Stadium
Referee: J. Imrie (Hawick)

Glasgow District:
North and Midlands:
