= David Edwards (cricketer, born 1980) =

English cricketer

Personal information
- Full name: David James Edwards
- Born: 6 June 1980 (age 46); Stoke-on-Trent, Staffordshire, England
- Batting: Right-handed
- Bowling: Right-arm fast-medium

Domestic team information
- Years: Team
- 2001–present: Staffordshire

Career statistics
Competition	List A
Matches	2
Runs scored	5
Batting average	5.00
100s/50s	–/–
Top score	5
Balls bowled	120
Wickets	1
Bowling average	73.00
5 wickets in innings	–
10 wickets in match	–
Best bowling	1/28
Catches/stumpings	1/–
- Source: Cricinfo, 13 June 2011

David James Edwards (born 6 June 1980) is an English cricketer. Edwards is a right-handed batsman who bowls right-arm fast-medium. He was born in Stoke-on-Trent, Staffordshire.

Edwards made his debut for Staffordshire in the 2001 MCCA Knockout Trophy against Cheshire. Edwards has played Minor counties cricket for Staffordshire from 2001 to present, which has included 19 Minor Counties Championship matches and 12 MCCA Knockout Trophy matches. In 2001, he made his List A debut against Northumberland in the 2nd round of the Cheltenham & Gloucester Trophy which was played in 2001. He played a further List A match against Warwickshire in the 3rd round of the competition which was played in 2002. In his 2 List A matches, he took just a single wicket at a cost of just 72 runs.
