= David Edwards (footballer, born 1974) =

English footballer

Personal information
- Full name: David John Edwards
- Date of birth: 13 January 1974 (age 52)
- Place of birth: Bridgnorth, England
- Position: Midfielder

Senior career*
Years	Team	Apps	(Gls)
1991–1993	Walsall	27	(1)
- Stafford Rangers
- * Club domestic league appearances and goals

David John Edwards (born 13 January 1974) is an English former professional footballer who played as a midfielder for Walsall.
