= John Cole (footballer) =

Scottish footballer

Personal information
- Full name: John Samuel Cole
- Date of birth: 16 December 1941 (age 84)
- Place of birth: Milton, Scotland
- Position: Wing half

Senior career*
Years	Team	Apps	(Gls)
1960–1965	Queen's Park	107	(4)
- Pan Hellenic

International career
1962–1964	Scotland Amateurs	13	(0)
- * Club domestic league appearances and goals

John Samuel Cole (born 16 December 1941) is a Scottish retired amateur football wing half who made over 100 appearances in the Scottish League for Queen's Park. He later played in Australia for Pan Hellenic and was capped by Scotland at amateur level.

== Personal life ==
Cole attended Holyrood Secondary School.

== Honours ==
Scotland Amateurs

- FA Centenary Amateur International Tournament
