= Dennis Yaager =

Australian soccer player

Dennis Yaager (born in Leichhardt, New South Wales) is an Australian former association football player.

== Playing career ==
=== Club career ===
During the 1964–65 season he spent time at Everton, though he did not make a first team appearance. He later had stints at Hakoah and Croatia in the New South Wales State League.

=== International career ===
Yaager made his full international debut for Australia in November 1970 against Iran in Tehran. He made his second and final appearance against Mexico in Mexico City in December 1970.
