= David Edwards (minister) =

David Edwards (1660-1716) was an Independent Minister who lived at Abermeurig in the Vale of Aeron. He was a Landed proprietor, owning property in Nantcwnlle and Llanddewi Brefi. He was a friend of John Jones, Llwynrhys who was the leading Independent in Central Cardiganshire. Edwards was a competent scholar and was ordained as assistant minister to David Jones at Caeronnen, Cellan, Crug y Maen, Llwyn Rhys and Cilgwyn.
