= David Edwards (footballer, born 1934) =

Welsh footballer (1934–2021)

Personal information
- Full name: David James Edwards
- Date of birth: 10 December 1934
- Place of birth: Treharris, Wales
- Date of death: November 2021 (aged 86)
- Place of death: Slough, Berkshire, England
- Position: Wing half

Senior career*
| Years | Team | Apps | (Gls) |
- Treharris BC
| 1956–1964 | Fulham | 38 | (0) |
- Sydney City
- * Club domestic league appearances and goals

David James Edwards (10 December 1934 – November 2021) was a Welsh professional footballer who played as a wing half for Fulham. Edwards died in Slough, Berkshire in November 2021, at the age of 86.
