= Lidcombe Oval =

Playing field and velodrome in Western Sydney, Australia

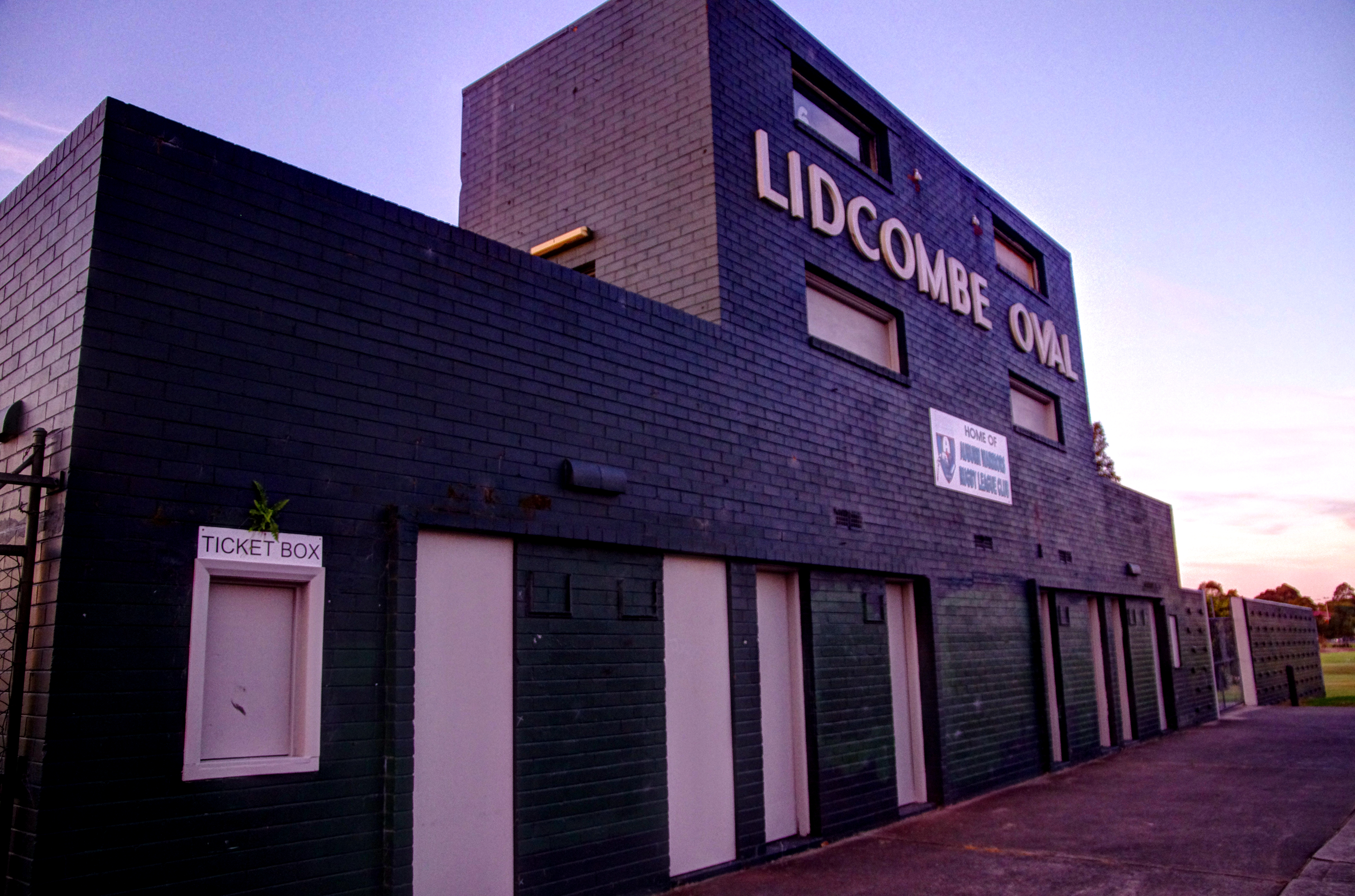
- Interactive map of Lidcombe Oval
- Location: Lidcombe, New South Wales, Australia
- Coordinates: 33°51′24″S 151°2′24″E
- Capacity: 12,000+
- Surface: Grass
- Record attendance: 21,015

Construction
- Opened: 1933

Lidcombe Oval is a playing field and velodrome in the Western Sydney suburb of Lidcombe and is part of Wyatt Park. It was first opened in 1933 with a completely flat track velodrome. Within a year the velodrome was rebuilt to include the banking that we see today. It is situated in the western end of Church Street, on the northern side of the railway line. The outfield has a capacity of approximately 15,000 spectators, with past crowds of more than 15000 being allowed to access the velodrome bike track. While the venue has been used for a number of sports over the years, velodrome has been in continuous use for track cycling events. Lidcombe-Auburn Cycle Club since 1947, and Neo Cycling Club since 2015.

The infield is used mainly for NSW Cup Rugby League matches. Since 2023 there have been seven matches per season scheduled for Lidcombe Oval.

== Ground & Track Use ==
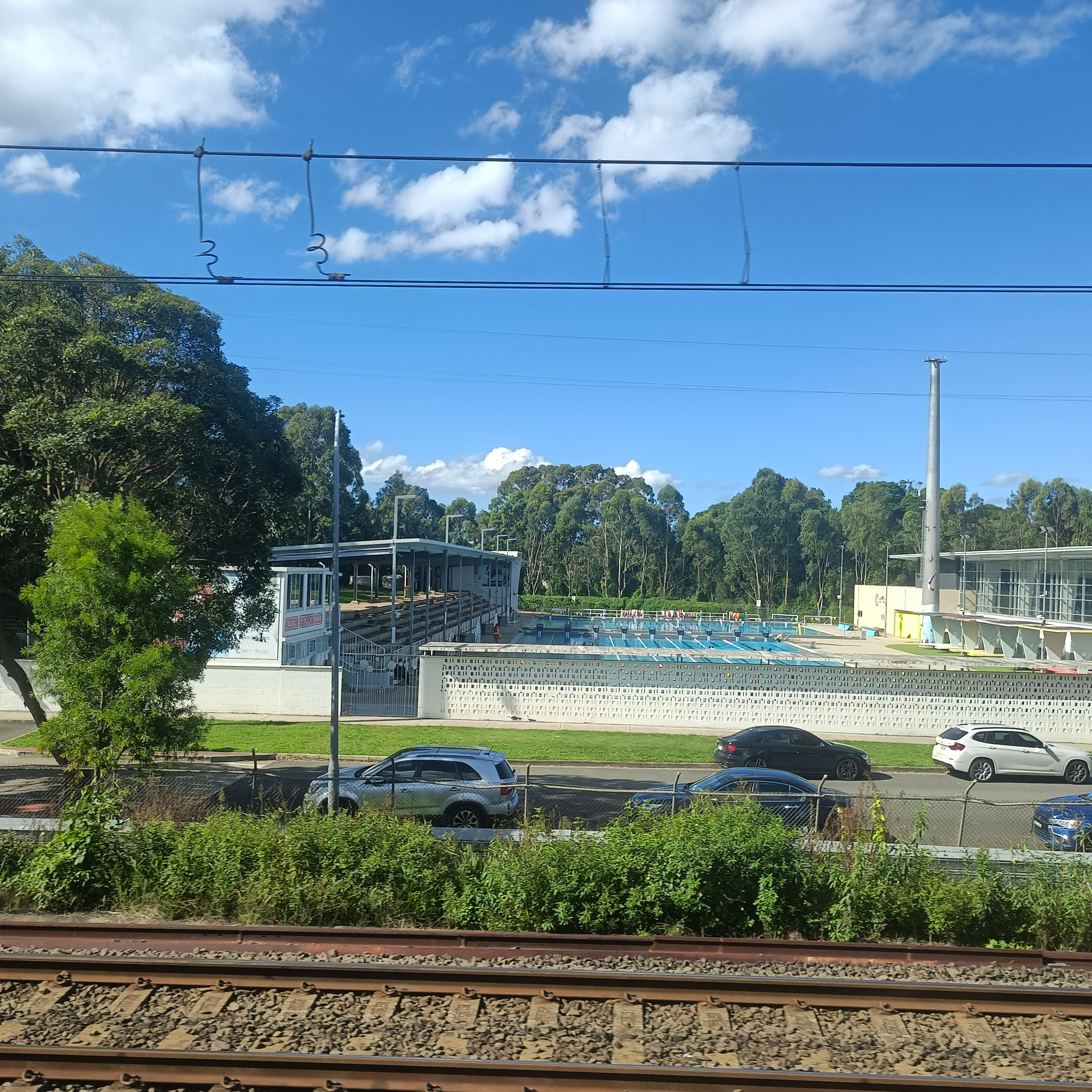
Lidcombe pool adjacent to Lidcombe Oval, 2026

=== Rugby League ===
In the NSWRL competition, the ground was home of the Western Suburbs Magpies rugby league team from 1967 to 1986, before the club moved to Campbelltown Stadium in 1987. The attendance record for the ground is 21,015, set in 1978 for a club match between Wests and local rival Parramatta. The Magpies moved from the ground after the 1986 NSWRL season to Campbelltown Stadium due to deteriorating quality of the facilities at the ground as well as a chance to claim a vast amount of junior rugby league players in the south-western suburbs. The final ever first grade game to be played at Lidcombe Oval was on 31 August 1986 between Western Suburbs and Easts. Easts won the match 8–6 in front of 7,375 people.

Today, Lidcombe Oval was used as the home ground of the Auburn Warriors up until the end of 2018 before the club was dissolved. The Western Suburbs Magpies for the last 3–4 seasons have played 1–2 home games a year at the ground as part of the "Return to Lidcombe' celebrations.

In 2017, Western Suburbs played against St Mary's in both the Sydney Shield and Ron Massey Cup matches at the ground to honor their connection with Lidcombe Oval.

On 26 May 2018, Western Suburbs played against Newtown in the "Return to Lidcombe" match. Newtown came from 18 points down in the second half to defeat Wests 23–22.

In March 2019, Lidcombe Oval hosted 2 Canterbury Cup NSW matches that featured fellow foundation clubs Newtown and North Sydney. Both games were broadcast live on Channel 9.

In November 2020, Western Suburbs announced that they would be returning to the ground more frequently in 2021, which included using the oval as their primary home ground as opposed to Campbelltown Stadium.

The Grandstand at Lidcombe Oval was named after Western Suburbs legend Tommy Raudonikis in 2022.

=== Cycling ===
Originally designed and commissioned by champion Commonwealth Sprinter and LACC member Grant Pye in the early 1930s, and used by the NSW League of Wheelmen for a number of years. It was sometime before amateur clubs and the NSW Cyclist Union were allowed to compete on the track. LACC held their first races at nearby Coleman park in 1927 and moved into the Lidcombe Oval Velodrome in 1947.

Lidcombe Oval is one of the last three remaining outdoor velodromes in the Greater Sydney Region including Hurstville Oval and Canterbury (AKA Tempe) Velodrome. A fourth outdoor velodrome remains at Merrylands however it has fallen into disrepair.

All year round the cycling track is used by a number of cycling clubs on most days for weekly training and racing. It has been home to Lidcombe-Auburn Cycle Club (LACC) since 1947 and Neo Cycling Club (Neo CC) since 2015. Until 2020, the cycling clubs had six bookings a week in summer and four in winter, however with the return of Rugby League in the minor grades, cycling has been reduced to two bookings per week over winter.

Initially a juniors club, Neo Cycling Club quickly became the largest junior cycling club in Australia. In 2020 Neo Cycling Club opened its membership to adults and quickly attracted more track cyclists than any other Sydney club. Neo use the track in the Winter season for training purposes, and both training and racing in the Summer season.

The Velodrome is also used to host the Cycling NSW Junior Metropolitan Track Championships and the InterSchool Cycling Track Student Championships.

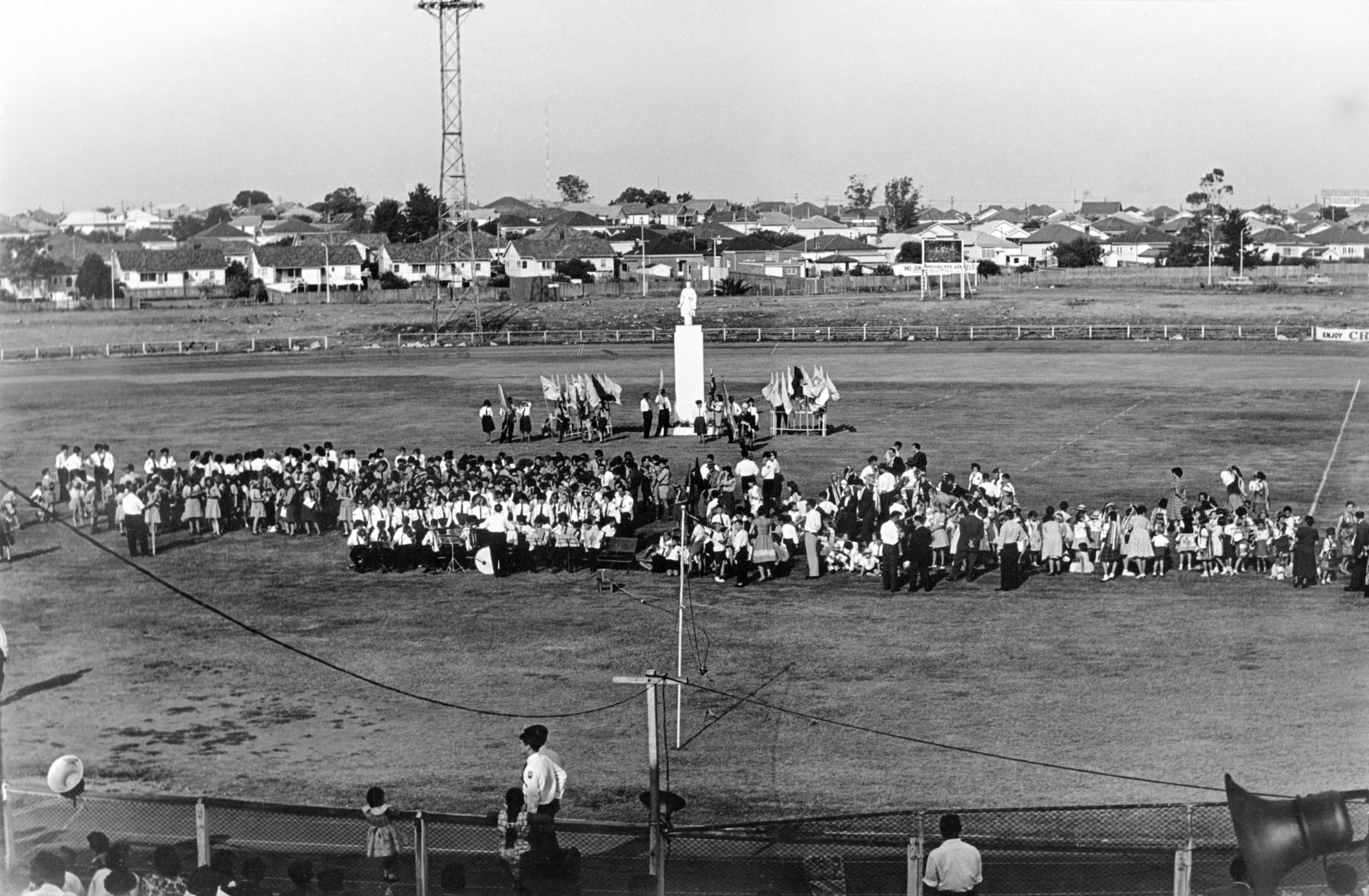
Lidcombe Oval in use by the Ukrainian community in February 1964 to commemorate 150 years from the birth of the poet Taras Shevchenko. The cycle track, built in 1947 can be seen on the perimeter.
