= Vic Fernandez =

Argentine footballer and manager (1939–2020)

- Fernandez in his later life

Personal information
- Full name: Victor Fernandez
- Date of birth: March 23, 1939
- Place of birth: Argentina
- Date of death: February 17, 2020 (aged 80)
- Place of death: Salta, Argentina
- Position: Midfielder

Senior career*
Years	Team	Apps	(Gls)
19??–19??	River Plate	?	(?)
19??–19??	San Lorenzo	2	(0)
19??–19??	Deportivo Español	?	(?)
1963–1969	St George-Budapest	?	(?)
1977	Canberra City	4	(0)

International career
1965	New South Wales	2	(?)

Managerial career
- 19??–19??: Canberra City
- 198?–19??: Inter Monaro
- 19??–19??: Canberra Metro
- 1992: Australia (caretaker)
- 2001–2002: Samoa
- * Club domestic league appearances and goals

Victor Fernandez (23 March 1939 – 17 February 2020) was an Argentine football player and manager who was caretaker manager of the Australian national team in 1992 and manager of Samoa from 2001 to 2002.

== Personal life and playing career ==
Fernandez was born in 1939 in Argentina. In Argentina, he played for River Plate, San Lorenzo, and Deportivo Español, before moving to Australia and playing from 1963 to 1969 for St George-Budapest and in 1977 for Canberra City.

He died on 17 February 2020 in Argentina.

== Managerial career ==
In Australia, Fernandez moved into management, and coached teams including Canberra City, Inter Monaro, and Canberra Metro. While coaching Canberra Metro in 1992, he was caretaker manager of the Australian national team for two A international games, one each against Malaysia and Indonesia, and two B internationals, one each against Thailand's and South Korea's youth teams. They won one and lost one of each category. Fernandez went on to coach the Samoan national side from 2001 to 2002.

== Managerial statistics ==
Team	From	To	Record				
Team	From	To	G	W	D	L	Win %
Australia (caretaker)	1992	1992	2	1	0	1	50.00
