= Ron Corry =

Australian soccer player and coach

Personal information
- Full name: Ronald Corry
- Date of birth: 21 July 1941 (age 85)
- Place of birth: Sydney, Australia
- Height: 1.72 m (5 ft 8 in)
- Position: Goalkeeper

Youth career
- Canterbury

Senior career*
Years	Team	Apps	(Gls)
1964	Canterbury		
1965	Pan Hellenic		
1966–1975	Sydney United		
1976	Manly		
1977	Sutherland		
1977–1978	Manly		
1980–1981	Marconi		

International career
1967–1973	Australia	33	(0)

Managerial career
- 1989–1990: Sydney United 58
- 1990–1991: Blacktown City
- 1995: Bankstown City
- 2000–2003: Wollongong Wolves
- 2006: Canterbury-Marrickville
- 2007: Sutherland
- 2012–2018: Western Sydney Wanderers (goalkeeping coach)
- 2023-24: Sydney United 58 (goalkeeping coach)
- 2026–: Sydney United 58 (goalkeeping coach)
- * Club domestic league appearances and goals as of 6 May 2026

Ron Corry (born 21 July 1941) is an Australian former football (soccer) player and coach. He played as a goalkeeper for Australia before entering a coaching career. He is currently the goalkeeping coach for Sydney United 58.

== Playing career ==
=== Club career ===
Corry, known to many as 'Yoda', began his playing career with Canterbury as a junior, graduating to the senior team in 1964. He moved to Pan Hellenic in 1965 before transferring to Croatia in 1966. After 10 seasons at Croatia he moved to Manly in 1976. He switched to Sutherland for the start of 1977 season before a mid-season return to Manly. In 1980, he joined Marconi in the National Soccer League. After the 1981 NSL season he retired from football. He is the earliest born Australian player to have played in the Australian National league, missing out on the overall title to English football legend Bobby Charlton who was born 4 years earlier in 1937. Corry is also one of the oldest players at their debut in either the NSL or A-League as he was approaching 40 years of age when he made his first national league appearance at Marconi.

=== International career ===
Corry played 33 full international matches for Australia between 1967 and 1973.

== Coaching career ==
In 1989 Corry became manager of Sydney Croatia. In 2000, Corry was appointed as manager of the current NSL champions the Wollongong Wolves. Corry led the side to another championship in his first season with the club.

He was appointed goalkeeping coach of Western Sydney Wanderers in 2012.

== Honours ==
=== Coaching ===
==== Club ====
Wollongong Wolves

- National Soccer League Championship: 2000–01

Western Sydney Wanderers

- AFC Champions League Champions: 2014
