= Trevor Edwards =

Welsh footballer (1937–2024)

Personal information
- Full name: Leonard Trevor Edwards
- Date of birth: 24 January 1937
- Place of birth: Rhondda, Wales
- Date of death: 30 May 2024 (aged 87)
- Place of death: Queensland, Australia
- Position: Full-back

Senior career*
Years	Team	Apps	(Gls)
1956–1960	Charlton Athletic	64	(0)
1960–1964	Cardiff City	73	(3)
1964–1968	Sydney Hakoah		
1969	Melita Eagles		
1970–1972	Marconi		

International career
	Wales U23	2	
1957	Wales	2	(0)
	Australia B	1	(0)
- * Club domestic league appearances and goals

Leonard Trevor Edwards (24 January 1937 – 30 May 2024) was a Welsh footballer. A full-back, he played his club football for Charlton Athletic. He was part of the Wales squad for the 1958 FIFA World Cup in Sweden. In the sixties he emigrated to Australia, where he played for Sydney Hakoah, Melita Eagles and Marconi with whom he won the Australian Championship. After his football career, Edwards stayed in Australia, living in Queensland. He died in Queensland on 30 May 2024, aged 87.
