= Arlington Oval =

Soccer stadium in Dulwich Hill, Sydney, New South Wales

- Interactive map of Arlington Oval
- Location: Dulwich Hill, Sydney
- Coordinates: 33°54′08.1″S 151°08′11.9″E
- Capacity: 6,000
- Surface: Synthetic
- Record attendance: 6,223

Construction
- Groundbreaking: 1932

The Arlington Recreation Ground (known as Arlington Oval) is a soccer stadium in Dulwich Hill, Sydney, Australia with a capacity of 6,000. This public football pitch is home to Dulwich Hill FC and Inner West Hawks (formerly Stanmore Hawks).

== History ==
Arlington Oval was built in 1932 with a natural-grass playing surface and a grandstand on land that had previously been used as a brickworks; the brick pits were infilled to create the green space. It was created due to the strive for professionalism from Metters FC. The Sydney Morning Herald described it as a "leading soccer ground."

=== Empire Games ===
During the British Empire Games in 1938, women athletes competed at Arlington Oval. The grandstand was used in scenes from the Australian movie The First Kangaroos, which was named after the Australian Rugby League's inaugural international tour of England.

=== Revamped venue ===
In mid-August 2014, Arlington Oval was upgraded for $2.15 million with the installation of a new pitch, replacing the existing natural grass surface, which had been in poor condition. The stadium was also upgraded with new lights, fencing, and other general improvements.
