= Johnny Watkiss =

English-born Australian soccer player (born 1941)

Personal information
- Full name: John Watkiss
- Date of birth: 28 March 1941 (age 85)
- Place of birth: Willenhall, England
- Position: Defender

Youth career
- Canterbury-Marrickville

Senior career*
Years	Team	Apps	(Gls)
1957–1963	Canterbury-Marrickville		
1964–1968	APIA Leichhardt		
1969–1974	Hakoah		
1975–1978	Sutherland		

International career
1965–1974	Australia	23	(2)

Managerial career
- 1977–1978: Sutherland
- * Club domestic league appearances and goals

John Watkiss (born 28 March 1941) is an English-born Australian soccer player. He was a member of the Australian 1974 FIFA World Cup squad in West Germany and represented Australia 31 times between 1965 and 1974 scoring 4 times.

Watkiss was born on 28 March 1941, in Willenhall, and moved to Australia as a child.

Watkiss Street in Glenwood is named for him.
