= Canterbury Bankstown FC =

Australian football club

Canterbury Bankstown Football Club
- Full name: Canterbury Bankstown Football Club
- Nickname: Berries
- Founded: 1886; 140 years ago
- Ground: Jensen Park, Regents Park, New South Wales
- Capacity: 6,000
- Manager: Wally Savor
- League: NSW League One
- 2025: 11th of 16
- Website: https://canterburybankstownfc.com.au/

The Canterbury Bankstown Football Club is a soccer club based in Bankstown, New South Wales. It competes in the NSW League One after gaining promotion at the end of the 2022 season. The club was formed in 1886 and was an original member of the NSW Federation of Soccer Clubs when it broke away from the New South Wales Soccer Football Association and competed in its inaugural season in 1957.

The club won the inaugural Federation Cup and were premiers of the regular season, losing the grand final to Auburn. The club predominantly played in the top tier of soccer in Australia until the formation of the National Soccer League in 1977 where it would play in NSW First Division instead.

The club would play at national level on one occasion in 1986.

Canterbury Bankstown home base at The Crest Reserve in Bass Hill, Sydney and hosts matches at Jensen Park in Regents Park, New South Wales

In total, Canterbury Bankstown have won two NSW Tier 1 premierships (1957 and 1985) and two championships (1958 and 1960). It has also won two Waratah Cups in 1957 and 1958) as well as two other lower division honours.

== History ==
They were one of the first football clubs formed in Sydney and competed in the first ever New South Wales State League as Canterbury FC, the club has also been known as Canterbury-Marrickville Olympic, West Sydney Berries and Bankstown Berries; the "Berry" part of the name derives from Canterbury. Since that time, the club has enjoyed some years of success and also painful years of premiership droughts and grand final losses. The club played in the 1986 season of the National Soccer League.

Having been one of the bigger and more successful district clubs in Sydney, by the mid-1960s the club found itself in severe financial strife. A group of influential and disgruntled Pan-Hellenic (Sydney Olympic) members and supporters decided because of various disputes to leave and enquired about investing in the club. It was all agreed that Canterbury would sell a controlling stake of the club to this group of investors, who wanted to form the basis of a 2nd big Greek soccer club in Sydney to challenge Pan-Hellenic, later to be known as Canterbury-Marrickville Olympic Soccer Club.

In the mid-2000s the club had changed its name from Canterbury-Marrickville Olympic to West Sydney Berries to increase its appeal across South-western Sydney. It was the first time in the club's history club played without Canterbury in its name except for the period when they were known solely as Marrickville Olympic during the late 70's early 80's.

The club was chosen by Football NSW to be automatically promoted along with Macarthur Rams to the NSW Premier League for the 2008 NSWPL Season. The main reason for the club's inclusion was to strengthen football's presence in Western Sydney and also to have a starting post for a possible Western Sydney franchise in the A-League. The team had an unsuccessful return to the top-flight league in New South Wales. The team managed a lowly 10th place and narrowly escaped relegation from the NSW Premier League. In July 2008 the West Sydney Berries announced they had raised more than $32.000 for the hospital at Westmead.

After finishing last in the 2010 NSW Premier League season the club was relegated to the NSW Super League for the 2011 season, and for the 2012 NSW Super League season was known as Bankstown Berries FC and has since been renamed Canterbury Bankstown FC.

=== Notable players ===
Johnny Warren, after whom Australian football's greatest prize, the Johnny Warren Medal is named is the best known personality of the history of the club. Alongside John Watkiss he participated in the World Cup 1974 in Germany. Graham Arnold, Charlie Yankos, goalkeeper Ron Corry, Peter Katholos, John Watkiss and Zlatko Arambasic are also Australian internationals who originated in the ranks of the club. Austrian legend, the former SK Rapid Wien player Leo Baumgartner belonged to the team with the Warren brothers, Watkiss and Corry that defeated Sydney FC Prague in the NSW grand-final of 1960 5–2. BONMYEONG KOO had golden boots in the football NSW league Two Men of 2022.

== Honours ==
=== Regional ===
NSW Tier 1

- NSW First Division Championship:
  - Winners (2): 1958, 1960
  - Runners-Up (3): 1957, 1961, 1994
- NSW First Division Premiership:
  - Winners (2): 1957, 1985
  - Runners-Up (3): 1958, 1961, 1994

NSW Tier 2

- NSW Second Division Championship:
  - Winners (1): 2005
  - Runners-Up (3): 1966, 2011, 2012
- NSW Second Division Premiership:
  - Winners (1): 1973
  - Runners-Up (4): 1966, 1972, 2005, 2011

NSW Tier 3

- NSW League Two Championship:
  - Winners (0):
  - Runners-Up (1): 2007
- NSW League Two Premiership:
  - Winners (1): 2007
  - Runners-Up (0):

Cups

- Federation Cup:
  - Winners (2): 1957, 1958
  - Runners-Up (4): 1960, 1961, 1962, 1995
- New South Wales Soccer Football Association State Cup:
  - Winners (2): 1946, 1947

== See also ==
- List of Canterbury Bankstown FC seasons
