= 1963 in Australian soccer =

Soccer in Australia
- Season: 1963

Men's soccer
- Australia Cup: Port Melbourne Slavia

The 1963 season was the second season of national competitive soccer in Australia and 80th overall.

== Cup competitions ==
=== Australia Cup ===
The competition began on 8 September 1963. Twenty-five clubs had entered the competition with the final two clubs Port Melbourne Slavia and Polonia Melbourne qualifying for the Final. The Final ended in a 0–0 draw with Port Melbourne Slavia winning the replay 3–2, with a hat-trick from Des Palmer.

==== Final ====
27 October 1963

Port Melbourne Slavia	0–0	Polonia Melbourne
	Report

Olympic Park Stadium
Attendance: 12,500
Referee: Tony Boskovic (Australia)

==== Replay ====
3 November 1963

Port Melbourne Slavia	3–2 (a.e.t.)	Polonia Melbourne
Palmer 81', 85', 104'	Report	Janczyk 19' (pen.); Jurecki 61'

Olympic Park Stadium
Attendance: 9,000
Referee: Tony Boskovic (Australia)
