= Gronowski =

Gronowski (feminine Gronowska) is a Polish surname. Notable people with this surname include:

- Henryk Gronowski (1928–1977), Polish footballer
- Jakub Gronowski (born 1983), Polish footballer
- Janusz Gronowski (born 1935), Polish athlete
- Mark Gronowski (born 2001), American football player
- Robert Gronowski (1926–1994), Polish footballer
- Simon Gronowski (born 1931), Belgian jazz pianist and Holocaust survivor
- Tadeusz Gronowski (1894–1990), Polish artist
