= 1963 NSWSF season =

NSW Federation of Soccer Clubs
- Season: 1963

The 1963 NSW Federation of Soccer Clubs (NSWSF) season was the seventh season of soccer in New South Wales under the administration of the federation since its breakaway from the NSW Soccer Football Association in January 1957.

== Representative team ==
This season again provided further representation for players of the federation in the Australian Representative Championship. This years edition would be the first year of a two-year span for the tournament as it expanded across every state federation for the first time. The NSWSF (Sydney) won two of its three matches, finishing the year in third place on the competition table.

| 15 April 1963 | South Australia | 3–2 | (New South Wales) NSW (Sydney) | Adelaide, South Australia |
| | Sinclair; Katolik | Report | Ninaus; Jeffrey | Stadium: Hindmarsh Stadium; Attendance: 4,500; Referee: T. Bued (Western Australia) |

| 25 April 1963 | NSW (Sydney) (New South Wales) | 3–2 | (Victoria (state)) Victoria | Sydney, Australia |
| | Barnett; Blitz; Ninaus | Report | Pearson | Stadium: Sydney Sports Ground; Attendance: 9,700; Referee: W. Vernon (Queensland) |

| 10 June 1963 | NSW (Sydney) (New South Wales) | 7–0 | Tasmania | Sydney, Australia |
| | Barnett; Ninaus; Alick Jeffrey | Report | | Stadium: Sydney Sports Ground; Attendance: 7,400; Referee: K. Irwin (Newcastle) |

== NSWSF member clubs at the Australia Cup ==
The first four teams at the close of the regular season were nominated to represent the NSWSF at the 'Craven A' Australia Cup. Representatives for the 1963 tournament were Prague, APIA Leichhardt, South Coast United and Pan Hellenic. South Coast United and Pan Hellenic were both defeated by other NSWSF teams in Round 2, with APIA Leichhardt losing in the quarter-finals and Prague losing in the third-place playoff.

| Club | First Round | Last Round |
|---|---|---|
| Sydney FC Prague | Round 2 | Third-place playoff |
| APIA Leichhardt FC | Round 2 | Quarter-finals |
| South Coast United | Round 2 | |
| Pan Hellenic | Round 2 | |

=== 1963 Australia Cup ===
==== Round 2 ====
| 29 September 1963 | APIA Leichhardt (New South Wales) | 2–0 | (New South Wales) South Coast United | Wentworth Park, Glebe |
| 15:00 AEST | Baumgartner 34'; Wong 48' | Report | | Attendance: 8,500; Referee: S. Pundyk |

| 7 October 1963 | Sydney Prague (New South Wales) | 2–1 (a.e.t.) | (New South Wales) Pan Hellenic | Wentworth Park, Sydney |
| | Sherwin 7'; Badaracco 106' | Report | Logan 12' | Attendance: 6,700; Referee: S. Pundyk |

==== Quarter-finals ====
| 13 October 1963 | Sydney Prague (New South Wales) | 5–2 | Brisbane Hellenic | Wentworth Park, Sydney |
| | | | | Attendance: 2,100 |

| 13 October 1963 | Port Melbourne Slavia | 3–1 | (New South Wales) APIA Leichhardt | Olympic Park Stadium, Melbourne |
| | | | | Attendance: 11,000 |

==== Semi-finals ====
| 20 October 1963 | Polonia Melbourne | 3–1 | (New South Wales) Sydney Prague | Melbourne Showgrounds, Melbourne |
| | | | | Attendance: 10,500 |

==== Third place playoff ====
| 27 October 1963 | Sydney Prague (New South Wales) | 1–2 | Adelaide Juventus | Wentworth Park, Sydney |
| | | | | Attendance: 2,000 |

== Leagues ==
Changes from last season:

| Division | Promoted to league | Relegated from league |
|---|---|---|
| First Division | Croatia | Polonia–North Side |
| Second Division | Thistle | Lidcombe |
| Third Division | Disbanded | |

=== First Division ===
First Division
- Season: 1963
- Champions: South Coast United
- Premiers: Prague
- Matches: 138
- Goals: 591 (4.28 per match)
- Best Player: Jim Kelly
- Top goalscorer: Brian Tristram (32)
- Biggest home win: APIA 8–1 Yugal; South Coast 7–0 Auburn; Auburn 9–2 Yugal
- Biggest away win: Croatia 0–8 South Coast
- Highest scoring: Auburn 9–2 Yugal

The home and away regular season began March and ended in August after 22 rounds. Prague once again finished first on the ladder to become regular season premiers for a fourth time in five years.

The finals series began in September with a four-team playoff series. Third placed team South Coast United defeated second placed APIA Leichhardt 4–0 in the grand final to become champions for the first time.

==== Table ====
| Pos | Team | Pld | W | D | L | GF | GA | GD | Pts | Qualification or relegation |
|---|---|---|---|---|---|---|---|---|---|---|
| 1 | Prague | 22 | 17 | 2 | 3 | 75 | 30 | +45 | 36 | Qualification for Finals series |
| 2 | A.P.I.A. | 22 | 14 | 3 | 5 | 70 | 38 | +32 | 31 | Qualification for Finals series |
| 3 | South Coast United (C) | 22 | 13 | 4 | 5 | 55 | 31 | +24 | 30 | Qualification for Finals series |
| 4 | Pan Hellenic | 22 | 12 | 6 | 4 | 56 | 37 | +19 | 30 | Qualification for Finals series |
| 5 | Gladesville-Ryde | 22 | 11 | 4 | 7 | 44 | 37 | +7 | 26 | |
| 6 | St. George-Budapest | 22 | 8 | 5 | 9 | 41 | 39 | +2 | 21 | |
| 7 | Canterbury-Marrickville | 22 | 7 | 6 | 9 | 37 | 45 | −8 | 20 | |
| 8 | Yugal-Ryde | 22 | 9 | 1 | 12 | 45 | 64 | −19 | 19 | |
| 9 | Hakoah | 22 | 3 | 8 | 11 | 41 | 59 | −18 | 14 | |
| 10 | Bankstown | 22 | 7 | 0 | 15 | 36 | 60 | −24 | 14 | |
| 11 | Croatia | 22 | 4 | 4 | 14 | 35 | 60 | −25 | 12 | |
| 12 | Auburn (R) | 22 | 5 | 1 | 16 | 33 | 68 | −35 | 11 | Relegated to Second Division |

(C) Champions; (R) Relegated

==== Finals series ====
Semi-finals; 1–15 September
Major Semifinal
1 | Prague | (2)(2)1
2 | A.P.I.A. | (2)(2)2
Minor Semifinal
3 | South Coast | 7
4 | Pan Hellenic | 1

Preliminary final 18 September
1 | Prague | 2
3 | South Coast | 3

Grand final 22 September
2 | A.P.I.A. | 0
3 | South Coast | 4

=== Second Division ===
Second Division
- Season: 1963
- Champions: Polonia-North Side
- Premiers: Corinthian BESC

The home and away regular season began in late March and ended in August after 22 rounds. Corinthian BESC finished first on the ladder to become regular season premiers.

The finals series began in September with a four-team playoff series. Second placed team Polonia-North Side defeated premiers Corinthian BESC 1–0 in the grand final to become second division champions for the first time.

==== Table ====
| Pos | Team | Pld | W | D | L | GF | GA | GD | Pts | Qualification or relegation |
|---|---|---|---|---|---|---|---|---|---|---|
| 1 | Corinthian BESC (P) | 22 | 21 | 1 | 0 | 88 | 16 | +72 | 43 | Qualification for Finals series |
| 2 | Polonia-North Side (C) | 22 | 14 | 3 | 5 | 60 | 22 | +38 | 31 | Qualification for Finals series |
| 3 | Balgownie Rangers | 22 | 15 | 1 | 6 | 58 | 35 | +23 | 31 | Qualification for Finals series |
| 4 | Sydney Austral | 22 | 13 | 1 | 8 | 46 | 41 | +5 | 27 | Qualification for Finals series |
| 5 | Granville AEK | 22 | 11 | 3 | 8 | 54 | 40 | +14 | 25 | |
| 6 | Melita Eagles | 22 | 11 | 2 | 9 | 54 | 44 | +10 | 24 | |
| 7 | Sutherland Shire | 22 | 9 | 4 | 9 | 58 | 56 | +2 | 22 | |
| 8 | Concordia | 22 | 10 | 2 | 10 | 39 | 44 | −5 | 22 | |
| 9 | Blacktown BSK | 22 | 7 | 3 | 12 | 39 | 45 | −6 | 17 | |
| 10 | Bankstown Thistle | 21 | 4 | 2 | 15 | 26 | 67 | −41 | 10 | |
| 11 | Manly Warringah | 21 | 2 | 1 | 18 | 26 | 74 | −48 | 5 | |
| 12 | Toongabbie | 22 | 2 | 1 | 19 | 25 | 89 | −64 | 5 | Withdrew at end of season |

(C) Champions; (P) Promoted

==== Finals series ====
Semi-finals; 1 September
Major Semifinal
1 | Corinthian BESC | 1
2 | Polonia-North Side | 2
Minor Semifinal
3 | Balgownie Rangers | 2
4 | Sydney Austral | 0

Preliminary final 7 September
1 | Corinthian BESC | 3
3 | Balgownie Rangers | 1

Grand final 14 September
2 | Polonia-North Side | 1
3 | Corinthian BESC | 0

== Cup competitions ==
Once again, the pre-season Ampol Cup and the Federation Cup were held, with SSC Yugal picking up their first Ampol Cup trophy and Hakoah claiming their third Federation Cup.

=== Ampol Cup ===
The season began with the seventh edition of the floodlight pre-season night series (sixth as the Ampol Cup) on 8 February 1963, culminating with the double-header third place playoff and Final on Friday, 15 March 1962 at the Redfern Oval in front of 7,000 spectators.

==== Finals series ====
Quarter-finals
Yugal-Ryde | 6
Hakoah | 2
A.P.I.A. | 4
Gladesville | 1
Auburn | 2
Canterbury-Marrickville | 1
Prague | 3
Budapest | 2

Semi-finals
Yugal-Ryde | 3
A.P.I.A. | 1
Auburn | 2(2)
Prague | 2(1)

Finals
Yugal-Ryde | 5
Auburn | 3
Third place playoff
A.P.I.A. | 4
Prague | 2

- NB: Replay scores in brackets.

==== Final ====
15 March 1963

| Yugal-Ryde | 5–3 | Auburn |
|---|---|---|
| Pacanin; Medina; Jelisavcic; Alagich | Report | Jeffrey; Tran; Baker |

Redfern Oval, Redfern, Sydney
Attendance: 7,000
Referee: Frank Sbisa

=== Federation Cup ===
==== Finals ====
Quarter-finals
Canterbury-Marrickville | 2
Polonia-North Side | 1
Yugal Ryde | 0
Sydney Hakoah | 2
Croatia Maroubra | 1
Gladesville-Ryde | 3
South Coast Utd | 2
Balgownie Rangers | 1

Semi-finals
Canterbury-Marrickville | 1(1)
Sydney Hakoah | 1(3)
Gladesville-Ryde | 1(0)
South Coast Utd | 1(1)

Final
Sydney Hakoah | 2
South Coast Utd | 1

- NB: Replay scores in brackets.

==== Final ====
Friday, 25 October 1963

| Hakoah | 2–1 | South Coast United |
|---|---|---|
| Gold 44'; Ninaus 62' | Report | Johnson 58' |

ES Marks Athletics Field, Moore Park
Attendance: 2,200
Referee: Roy Pearce

== See also ==
- 1963 in Australian soccer
