= 1963 Australia Cup final =

- Event: 1963 Australia Cup
Port Melbourne Slavia	Polonia Melbourne
0	0
- Date: 27 October 1963
- Venue: Olympic Park Stadium, Melbourne
- Referee: Tony Boskovic (Australia)
- Attendance: 12,500

1963 Australia Cup final replay
- Event: 1963 Australia Cup
Port Melbourne Slavia	Polonia Melbourne
3	2
- Date: 3 November 1963
- Venue: Olympic Park Stadium, Melbourne
- Referee: Tony Boskovic (Australia)
- Attendance: 9,000

The 1963 Australia Cup final was the second Australia Cup Final, the final match of the 1963 Australia Cup. It was played at Olympic Park Stadium in Melbourne, Australia, on 3 November 1963, contested by Port Melbourne Slavia and Polonia Melbourne. The Final ended in a 0–0 draw with Port Melbourne Slavia winning the replay 3–2, with a hat-trick from Des Palmer.

== Route to the final ==
=== Port Melbourne Slavia ===
Round	Opposition	Score
2nd	Footscray JUST (H)	4–3
QF	APIA Leichhardt (H)	3–1
SF	Adelaide Juventus (A)	2–0
Key: (H) = Home venue; (A) = Away venue.

Port Melbourne Slavia started in the second round where they were drawn with Footscray JUST at home. Slavia won 4–3 from John Auchie, Des Palmer and a double by Tommy Harper. In the quarter-finals, Slavia played against APIA Leichhardt at home where they won 3–1 from Hammy McMeechan, Des Palmer and Tommy Harper. In the semi-finals, Slavia played against Adelaide Juventus where they won 2–0 from Hammy McMeechan and Des Palmer.

=== Polonia Melbourne ===
Round	Opposition	Score
2nd	George Cross (H)	0–0 (4–3)
QF	Brisbane Azzurri (A)	3–0
SF	Sydney Prague (H)	3–1
Key: (H) = Home venue; (A) = Away venue.

Polonia Melbourne started in the second round also, where they were drawn with George Cross at home. Polonia won 4–3 by penalties after a 0–0 draw. In the quarter-finals, Polonia played against Brisbane Azzurri away where they won 3–0 from Lolly Vella, Edmund Zientara and Michael Jurecki. In the semi-finals, Polonia played against Sydney Praguge where they won 3–1 from Eddie Jankowski, Vic Janczyk, Michael Jurecki.

== Match ==
=== Details ===
==== Final ====
27 October 1963

Port Melbourne Slavia	0–0	Polonia Melbourne
	Report

Olympic Park Stadium
Attendance: 12,500
Referee: Tony Boskovic (Australia)

==== Replay ====
3 November 1963

Port Melbourne Slavia	3–2 (a.e.t.)	Polonia Melbourne
Palmer 81', 85', 104'	Report	Janczyk 19' (pen.); Jurecki 61'

Olympic Park Stadium
Attendance: 9,000
Referee: Tony Boskovic (Australia)
