= Gajda =

Gajda may refer to:

- Gaida or gajda, a bagpipe from southeastern Europe
- Alexandra Gajda, English historian
- Bogdan Gajda, Polish boxer
- Norbert Gajda, Polish footballer
- Radola Gajda, Czech general and fascist leader
