= Jakub Gronowski =

Polish association football player

Personal information
- Full name: Jakub Gronowski
- Date of birth: 8 April 1983 (age 43)
- Place of birth: Puck, Poland
- Height: 1.86 m (6 ft 1 in)
- Position: Forward

Senior career*
Years	Team	Apps	(Gls)
2000–2003	Bałtyk Gdynia	62	(5)
2003–2004	Lechia Gdańsk	20	(1)
2004–2005	Kaszuby Połchowo		
2005	Lechia Gdańsk	8	(0)
2006	Cartusia Kartuzy		
2006–2007	Orkan Rumia		
2007	Bałtyk Gdynia	16	(5)
2007–2008	Gryf Wejherowo		
2008	Orkan Rumia	11	(2)
2009–2010	Gryf Wejherowo	26	(10)
2010–2011	Bytovia Bytów	26	(9)
2012–2013	Powiśle Dzierzgoń		
2013–2015	GKS Przodkowo	29	(14)
2015–2016	KP Starogard Gdański		
2017–2019	Wda Lipusz		
2019	Tucholanka Tuchola		
2020	Kolejarz Chojnice		
- * Club domestic league appearances and goals

Jakub Gronowski (born 8 April 1983) is a Polish former professional footballer. He played as a forward.

== Career ==
Gronowski started his career playing with Bałtyk Gdynia, with whom he made 62 appearances over three seasons. Gronowski joined Lechia Gdańsk for the 2003–04 season. During this season, he made 20 appearances and scored one goal for the club as the it went on to win promotion from the IV liga. After spending the following season with Kaszuby Połchowo he again returned to Lechia Gdańsk, making eight appearances in the II liga, Poland's second division. These six months with Lechia would prove to be the highlight of Gronowski's career as he would go on to have short spells with teams playing in the lower divisions. After his second spell with Lechia he went on to play for Cartusia Kartuzy, Orkan Rumia twice, Gryf Wejherowo twice, Bytovia Bytów, Powiśle Dzierzgoń, GKS Przodkowo, KP Starogard Gdański, Wda Lipusz, Tucholanka Tuchola, and Kolejarz Chojnice being his final club in 2020.

== Personal life ==
Gronowski's grandfather is former Lechia Gdańsk and Poland international footballer Robert Gronowski. Through his grandfather he is related to Henryk Gronowski, Robert's brother, who was also a former Lechia Gdańsk and Poland international footballer. Through his grandmother, Robert's wife, he is related to former Lechia player and manager Leszek Goździk.
