= 1961 Ekstraklasa =

35th season of top-tier football league in Poland

Liga
- Season: 1961
- Champions: Górnik Zabrze (3rd title)
- Relegated: Polonia Bydgoszcz; Zawisza Bydgoszcz
- Top goalscorer: Ernst Pohl (24 goals)

Statistics of Ekstraklasa for the 1961 season.

== Overview ==
It was contested by 14 teams, and Górnik Zabrze won the championship.

== League table ==
| Pos | Team | Pld | W | D | L | GF | GA | GD | Pts | Qualification or relegation |
|---|---|---|---|---|---|---|---|---|---|---|
| 1 | Górnik Zabrze (C) | 26 | 19 | 5 | 2 | 73 | 18 | +55 | 43 | Qualification to European Cup preliminary round |
| 2 | Polonia Bytom | 26 | 14 | 7 | 5 | 53 | 29 | +24 | 35 | |
| 3 | Legia Warsaw | 26 | 13 | 6 | 7 | 51 | 35 | +16 | 32 | |
| 4 | Wisła Kraków | 26 | 12 | 8 | 6 | 42 | 35 | +7 | 32 | |
| 5 | Ruch Chorzów | 26 | 12 | 7 | 7 | 48 | 42 | +6 | 31 | |
| 6 | Odra Opole | 26 | 9 | 10 | 7 | 51 | 35 | +16 | 28 | |
| 7 | Zagłębie Sosnowiec | 26 | 6 | 12 | 8 | 35 | 38 | −3 | 24 | Qualification to Cup Winners' Cup preliminary round |
| 8 | Lechia Gdańsk | 26 | 9 | 6 | 11 | 27 | 35 | −8 | 24 | |
| 9 | ŁKS Łódź | 26 | 8 | 6 | 12 | 32 | 39 | −7 | 22 | |
| 10 | Lech Poznań | 26 | 8 | 6 | 12 | 27 | 40 | −13 | 22 | |
| 11 | KS Cracovia | 26 | 9 | 3 | 14 | 41 | 44 | −3 | 21 | |
| 12 | Stal Mielec | 26 | 8 | 5 | 13 | 34 | 45 | −11 | 21 | |
| 13 | Polonia Bydgoszcz (R) | 26 | 8 | 3 | 15 | 36 | 69 | −33 | 19 | Relegated to II liga |
| 14 | Zawisza Bydgoszcz (R) | 26 | 3 | 4 | 19 | 18 | 64 | −46 | 10 | Relegated to II liga |

Source: 90minut.pl (in Polish)
(C) Champions; (R) Relegated

== Results ==
| Home \ Away | CRA | GÓR | LPO | LGD | LEG | ŁKS | OOP | BYG | BYT | RUC | STA | WIS | ZSO | ZAW |
|---|---|---|---|---|---|---|---|---|---|---|---|---|---|---|
| Cracovia | | 2–3 | 6–2 | 0–1 | 1–2 | 2–1 | 2–0 | 4–1 | 1–2 | 1–3 | 1–1 | 0–1 | 1–1 | 4–1 |
| Górnik Zabrze | 2–1 | | 3–0 | 2–0 | 5–1 | 2–1 | 4–2 | 4–1 | 0–0 | 0–0 | 7–1 | 3–0 | 4–1 | 6–1 |
| Lech Poznań | 1–1 | 0–2 | | 2–0 | 2–4 | 1–0 | 0–2 | 3–1 | 1–1 | 1–0 | 1–0 | 0–0 | 2–0 | 2–0 |
| Lechia Gdańsk | 4–0 | 0–1 | 2–0 | | 1–1 | 1–1 | 1–0 | 6–1 | 0–1 | 0–0 | 0–2 | 1–1 | 2–1 | 0–2 |
| Legia Warsaw | 3–2 | 1–1 | 2–0 | 0–1 | | 5–1 | 0–0 | 3–0 | 4–1 | 6–0 | 2–1 | 0–1 | 1–1 | 4–1 |
| ŁKS Łódź | 1–2 | 2–1 | 2–0 | 0–0 | 3–1 | | 0–0 | 2–0 | 0–1 | 1–1 | 1–0 | 0–3 | 3–1 | 3–0 |
| Odra Opole | 2–1 | 1–1 | 1–0 | 9–2 | 2–1 | 5–1 | | 1–1 | 1–2 | 3–1 | 0–0 | 4–2 | 2–2 | 6–1 |
| Polonia Bydgoszcz | 2–0 | 0–5 | 1–1 | 1–0 | 2–4 | 2–1 | 4–3 | | 1–7 | 0–1 | 3–3 | 3–1 | 3–1 | 3–0 |
| Polonia Bytom | 1–2 | 0–0 | 4–1 | 0–1 | 0–1 | 3–1 | 2–1 | 2–0 | | 3–3 | 3–1 | 3–0 | 2–2 | 2–1 |
| Ruch Chorzów | 4–1 | 0–2 | 3–1 | 2–1 | 4–1 | 1–3 | 3–3 | 4–2 | 0–4 | | 2–1 | 4–0 | 1–1 | 4–1 |
| Stal Mielec | 1–5 | 1–6 | 1–0 | 6–1 | 2–0 | 1–1 | 0–0 | 2–0 | 4–3 | 1–2 | | 1–2 | 0–1 | 2–0 |
| Wisła Kraków | 1–0 | 2–1 | 2–2 | 1–1 | 0–0 | 2–1 | 1–1 | 4–0 | 2–5 | 3–1 | 3–1 | | 1–1 | 5–1 |
| Zagłębie Sosnowiec | 3–0 | 0–2 | 1–3 | 1–0 | 1–2 | 2–2 | 2–2 | 6–1 | 1–1 | 2–2 | 1–0 | 0–0 | | 1–0 |
| Zawisza Bydgoszcz | 0–1 | 0–6 | 1–1 | 0–1 | 2–2 | 2–0 | 1–0 | 1–3 | 0–0 | 0–2 | 0–1 | 1–4 | 1–1 | |

Source: 90minut.pl (in Polish)
Legend: Blue = home team win; Yellow = draw; Red = away team win.

== Top goalscorers ==
| Rank | Player | Club | Goals |
|---|---|---|---|
| 1 | (Poland) Ernest Pol | Górnik Zabrze | 24 |
| 2 | (Poland) Marian Norkowski | Polonia Bydgoszcz | 21 |
| 3 | (Poland) Norbert Gajda | Odra Opole | 17 |
| 4 | (Poland) Edward Jankowski | Górnik Zabrze | 16 |
| 4 | (Poland) Engelbert Jarek | Odra Opole | 16 |
| 6 | (Poland) Jan Liberda | Polonia Bytom | 15 |
| 6 | (Poland) Edward Pietrasiński | Cracovia | 15 |
| 8 | (Poland) Tadeusz Błażejewski | Legia Warsaw | 14 |
| 8 | (Poland) Łucjan Gojny | Lech Poznań | 14 |
| 8 | (Poland) Eugeniusz Lerch | Ruch Chorzów | 14 |

== Attendances ==
| # | Club | Average |
|---|---|---|
| 1 | Cracovia | 18,923 |
| 2 | ŁKS | 17,769 |
| 3 | Lech Poznań | 16,615 |
| 4 | Ruch Chorzów | 16,462 |
| 5 | Wisła Kraków | 16,231 |
| 6 | Górnik Zabrze | 14,615 |
| 7 | Lechia Gdańsk | 13,538 |
| 8 | Polonia Bytom | 13,385 |
| 9 | Polonia Bydgoszcz | 11,462 |
| 10 | Stal Mielec | 9,615 |
| 11 | Legia Warszawa | 9,385 |
| 12 | Odra Opole | 9,231 |
| 13 | Zagłębie Sosnowiec | 9,077 |
| 14 | Zawisza Bydgoszcz | 7,308 |
