= Robert Wemyss =

Scottish-born Australian soccer player

Personal information
- Full name: Robert Wemyss
- Date of birth: 1 July 1928 (age 98)
- Place of birth: Scotland
- Position: Midfielder

Senior career*
Years	Team	Apps	(Gls)
1956–1959	Polonia		

International career^{‡}
1958	Australia	2	(?)
- * Club domestic league appearances and goals as of 11 May 2009 ‡ National team caps and goals as of 11 May 2009

Robert Wemyss (born 1 July 1928) is an Australian former soccer player.

== Playing career ==
=== Club career ===
Wemyss played for Polonia SC in the Victorian State League from 1956 to 1959. Wemyss was a joint winner of the Argus Medal in 1956, the Victorian Division 1 player of the year award.

== Biography ==
Wemyss was born in Scotland. He was a member of the Australia squad at the 1956 Summer Olympics, but did not make his debut for the national team until 1958. Wemyss played his only two matches for Australia in 1958, both against New Zealand.
