= Zdzisław Kostrzewa =

Polish footballer (1955–1991)

Personal information
- Full name: Zdzisław Kostrzewa
- Date of birth: 26 October 1955
- Place of birth: Wrocław, Poland
- Date of death: 20 May 1991 (aged 35)
- Place of death: Melbourne, Australia
- Height: 1.82 m (6 ft 0 in)
- Position: Goalkeeper

Senior career*
Years	Team	Apps	(Gls)
- Lotnik Wrocław
1973–1976	Zagłębie Wałbrzych		
1976–1978	Zagłębie Sosnowiec	71	(0)
1979–1984	Śląsk Wrocław	98	(0)
1984–1987	Ślęza Wrocław		
1987–1989	Polonia Melbourne	54	(0)

International career
1978–1981	Poland	3	(0)
- * Club domestic league appearances and goals

Zdzisław Kostrzewa (26 October 1955 – 20 May 1991) was a Polish footballer who played as a goalkeeper. During his club career, he won the Polish Cup back-to-back in 1977 and 1978 with Zagłębie Sosnowiec. In 1987, he claimed the Victorian State League championship with Maribyrnong Polonia.

He played for the Poland national team and participated in the 1978 FIFA World Cup. He was buried in Williamstown Cemetery.

== Honours ==
Zagłębie Sosnowiec

- Polish Cup: 1976–77, 1977–78

Polonia Melbourne

- Victorian State League: 1987
