= Wiesław Jańczyk =

Polish footballer (born 1931)

Personal information
- Full name: Wiesław Roman Jańczyk
- Date of birth: 13 June 1931 (age 95)
- Place of birth: Łódź, Poland
- Height: 1.76 m (5 ft 9 in)
- Position: Right winger

Senior career*
Years	Team	Apps	(Gls)
1949–1951	Bawełna Łódź		
1952–1959	ŁKS Łódź		
1959–1961	Polonia SC		
1961–1962	ŁKS Łódź		
1962–1968	Polonia SC		

International career
1957	Poland	1	(0)
- * Club domestic league appearances and goals

Wiesław Roman Jańczyk (born 13 June 1931) is a Polish former footballer and basketball player. He played in one match for the Poland national football team in 1957.

== Honours ==
=== Football ===
ŁKS Łódź

- Ekstraklasa: 1958
- Polish Cup: 1957

=== Basketball ===
- Polish Basketball Championship: 1953
