= Edward Jankowski =

Polish footballer (1930–1987)

Personal information
- Full name: Edward Karol Jankowski
- Date of birth: 9 January 1930
- Place of birth: Bogucice, Poland
- Date of death: 19 March 1987 (aged 57)
- Place of death: Rybnik, Poland
- Height: 1.78 m (5 ft 10 in)
- Position: Forward

Senior career*
Years	Team	Apps	(Gls)
1942–1943	1. FC Katowice		
1944	TuS Bogucice		
1945–1950	KS 20 Bogucice		
1950–1951	Gwardia Warsaw		
1951	Wawel Kraków		
1951–1953	Legia Warsaw		
1953	Górnik Radlin		
1954–1962	Górnik Zabrze	140	(75)
1962–1964	Polonia Melbourne		
1965–1969	ROW Rybnik		

International career
1952–1961	Poland	10	(4)

Managerial career
- ROW Rybnik II
- * Club domestic league appearances and goals

Edward Karol Jankowski (9 January 1930 — 19 March 1987) was a Polish footballer who played as a forward.

Born in Bogucice, he played for clubs including Gwardia Warsaw, Legia Warsaw, Górnik Radlin, Górnik Zabrze, Maribymong Polonia and ROW Rybnik.

Jankowski made his international debut for Poland on 25 May 1952 in a 1–0 friendly loss away to Romania, going on to total ten caps and four goals. All of these goals came in fixtures against Finland in 1958 FIFA World Cup qualification: a hat-trick in a 3–1 win in Helsinki on 5 July 1957, and one in a 4–0 victory in Warsaw on 3 November.

== Honours ==
Górnik Zabrze

- Ekstraklasa: 1957, 1959, 1961
