= Des Palmer =

Welsh footballer

Personal information
- Full name: Desmond Frederick Palmer
- Date of birth: 23 September 1931
- Place of birth: Swansea, Wales
- Position: Forward

Senior career*
Years	Team	Apps	(Gls)
1952–1959	Swansea Town	84	(38)
1959–1960	Liverpool	0	(0)
1960-1961	Johannesburg Ramblers		
1961–1962	Derby County	18	(6)
1963–1964	Slavia-Port Melbourne		
1965	SSC Yugal		
1965	Adamstown		

International career
1957	Wales	3	(3)
- * Club domestic league appearances and goals

Desmond "Des" Frederick Palmer (born 23 September 1931) is a retired Welsh male international footballer who played as a forward. He was part of the Wales national football team, playing 3 matches and scoring 3 goals. He played his first match on 26 May 1957 against Czechoslovakia and his last match on 19 October 1957 against England. He scored a hat-trick during the 1958 FIFA World Cup qualification of the match against East Germany on 25 September 1957. On club level he played for Swansea City A.F.C. between 1952 and 1959. He then moved to Liverpool, but didn't play a match for their senior team. He had a successful stint with Johannesburg Ramblers before playing a final season (1961–62) in England with Derby County F.C. during which he made 18 appearances and scored 6 goals.

After this, Palmer moved to Australia and played two seasons with Port Melbourne Slavia in the Victorian State League. He guided his team to victory in the 1963 Australia Cup, scoring a hat-trick in their 3–2 win in the Final Replay against Polonia Melbourne.

== See also ==
- List of Wales international footballers (alphabetical)
- List of Wales national football team hat-tricks
