= Lolly Vella =

Australian soccer player (1933–2012)

Personal information
- Full name: Emmanuel Vella
- Date of birth: 7 August 1933
- Place of birth: Malta
- Date of death: 29 September 2012 (aged 79)

Senior career*
| Years | Team | Apps | (Gls) |
| 1956–1958 | Footscray JUST | | |
| 1959–1962 | Sunshine George Cross | | |
| 1962-1963 | Maribyrnong-Polonia | | |
| 1964 | Sunshine George Cross | | |
| 1965–1966 | Footscray JUST | | |

International career
| 1958 | Australia | 2 | (0) |
- * Club domestic league appearances and goals

Emmanuel "Lolly" Vella (7 August 1933 – 29 September 2012) was a professional soccer player. Born in Malta, he played for the Australia national team.

== Club career ==
Vella played for Footscray JUST, Sunshine George Cross and Maribyrnong-Polonia in the Victoria State League.

== International career ==
Vella played two matches for the Australia national team in 1958 against New Zealand.

== Post-football ==
Vella worked for Massey Ferguson until retiring at the age of 57. He died in September 2012.
