= Robert Gronowski =

Polish footballer and manager

Personal information
- Full name: Robert Henryk Gronowski
- Birth name: Robert Heinrich Gruner
- Date of birth: 13 May 1926
- Place of birth: Gliwice, Poland (then Germany)
- Date of death: 24 February 1994 (aged 67)
- Place of death: Hamburg, Germany
- Height: 1.72 m (5 ft 8 in)
- Position: Forward

Youth career
- 1933–1935: Vorwärts-Rasensport Gleiwitz
- 1935–1940: RSV Gleiwitz

Senior career*
| Years | Team | Apps | (Gls) |
| 1946–1948 | Piast Gliwice | | |
| 1949–1960 | Lechia Gdańsk | 168 | (56) |
| 1950 | → AKS Chorzów (loan) | 3 | (1) |
| 1960–1961 | Polonia Gdańsk | | |
| 1961–1962 | Polonia Melbourne | | |
| 1962–1963 | Polonia Sydney | | |

International career
| 1953 | Poland | 1 | (0) |

Managerial career
- 1961–1962: Polonia Melbourne (player-manager)
- 1962–1963: Polonia Sydney (player-manager)
- 1966: Lechia Gdańsk
- SKS Stoczniowiec Gdańsk
- RKS Stocznia Północna
- Ogniwo Sopot
- * Club domestic league appearances and goals

Robert Henryk Gronowski (born Robert Heinrich Gruner; 13 May 1926 – 24 February 1994) was a Polish professional association football player and manager. He spent the majority of his career with Lechia Gdańsk, with whom he also managed for a brief spell after retiring from playing professional football. His brother, Henryk Gronowski was also a former professional footballer who played as a goalkeeper.

== Early years ==
Having been born in Gliwice in 1926, which was then in Germany, Robert was born as Robert Gruner. Unlike his brother Henryk who changed his name to the Polish version of their last name, Gronowski, Robert never officially changed his name and was always known as Robert Gruner throughout his lifetime. However, all footballing records stated his name as Robert Gronowski.

== Senior career ==
After World War 2 Gronowski joined the newly established football team of his birth city Piast in Gliwice, which had now been integrated into Poland. In 1949 Gronowski joined Lechia Gdańsk with his younger brother, Henryk. Gronowski spent a total of 11 years at Lechia, playing over 158 games in all competitions and scored 58 goals in all competitions, still placing as one of the club's highest goalscorers in their history, and is still the club's third highest goalscorer in the Ekstraklasa with 35 goals in the top division. In 1961 Gronowski moved to Australia to play for Polonia Melbourne and Polonia Sydney, Football teams which had been created by Polish nationals who had moved to Australia. During his time with the clubs, Gronowski also acted as the clubs' manager, with the role as a player manager.

== International career ==
In 1953 Gronowski played for Poland, in what turned out to be his only international appearance. He played against Albania in a 2–0 defeat.

== Managerial career ==
After his roles as a player manager in Australia, Gronowski focused solely on management. His first full-time appointment was with Lechia Gdańsk in 1966, meaning his first three management jobs also saw him managing his brother. His time at Lechia didn't last long, and Gronowski soon found himself without a job. After Lechia Gronowski managed SKS Stoczniowiec Gdańsk, RKS Stocznia Północna, and Ogniwo Sopot, all of which are located in the Tricity area.

== Personal life ==
Gronowski is commemorated by a star at the MOSiR Stadium in Gdańsk. The "Avenue of Stars" commemorates the efforts and success of former players and coaches.
