= Norbert Gajda =

Polish footballer

Personal information
- Date of birth: 1 April 1934
- Place of birth: Świętochłowice, Poland
- Date of death: 16 September 1980 (aged 46)
- Place of death: Opole, Poland
- Height: 1.72 m (5 ft 8 in)
- Position: Forward

Senior career*
Years	Team	Apps	(Gls)
1946–1954	Naprzód Lipiny		
1955–1957	Wawel Kraków		
1958–1959	Naprzód Lipiny		
1960–1966	Odra Opole		
1966–1969	Polonia Melbourne		
1969–1970	Odra Opole		

International career
1961–1962	Poland	7	(2)
- * Club domestic league appearances and goals

Norbert Gajda (1 April 1934 – 16 September 1980) was a Polish footballer who played as a forward.

He made seven appearances for the Poland national team from 1961 to 1962.
