= 1963 Australia Cup =

Tournament details
- Country: Australia
- Teams: 24

Final positions
- Champions: Port Melbourne Slavia (1st title)
- Runners-up: Polonia Melbourne

Tournament statistics
- Matches played: 25

The 1963 Australia Cup was the second season of the Australia Cup, which was the main national association football knockout cup competition in Australia. 24 clubs from around Australia qualified to enter the competition.

== Teams ==
Qualifying clubs
(New South Wales) NNSW	Wallsend	West Wallsend	Awaba	Newcastle Austral
(New South Wales) NSW	Sydney Prague	APIA Leichhardt	South Coast United	Pan Hellenic
(Queensland) QLD	Brisbane Hellenic	Brisbane Azzurri	Latrobe	Merton Rovers
(South Australia) SA	Adelaide Juventus	Adelaide Budapest	Adelaide Croatia	Adelaide Polonia
(Tasmania) TAS	Olympia	Launceston Juventus	Ulverstone	Hobart Rangers
(Victoria (state)) VIC	Footscray JUST	Polonia Melbourne	George Cross	Port Melbourne Slavia

== Bracket ==
First Round
Adelaide Juventus	6
Adelaide Polonia	0
Adelaide Budapest	3
Adelaide Croatia	0
Olympia	3
Launceston Juventus	2
Ulverstone	0
Hobart Rangers	1
Brisbane Azzurri	1
Latrobe	0
Newcastle Austral	3
Wallsend	0
Toronto Awaba	6
West Wallsend	5
Brisbane Hellenic	4
Merton Rovers	2

Second Round
Adelaide Juventus	3
Adelaide Budapest	1
Olympia	5
Hobart Rangers	1
Port Melbourne Slavia (a.s.d.e.t.)	4
Footscray JUST	3
APIA Leichhardt	2
South Coast United	0
Brisbane Azzurri	1
Newcastle Austral	0
Polonia Melbourne (p)	0 (4)
George Cross	0 (3)
Sydney Prague (a.e.t.)	2
Pan Hellenic	1
Toronto Awaba	2
Brisbane Hellenic	3

Quarter-finals
Adelaide Juventus	3
Olympia	0
Port Melbourne Slavia	3
APIA Leichhardt	1
Brisbane Azzurri	0
Polonia Melbourne	3
Sydney Prague	5
Brisbane Hellenic	2

Semi-finals
Adelaide Juventus	0
Port Melbourne Slavia	2
Polonia Melbourne	3
Sydney Prague	1

Final
Port Melbourne Slavia (replay)	0 (3)
Polonia Melbourne	0 (2)
Third place play-off
Sydney Prague	1
Adelaide Juventus	2

== Round 1 ==
29 September 1963

Toronto Awaba	6–5	West Wallsend

Newcastle

29 September 1963

Newcastle Austral	3–0	Wallsend

Newcastle

Brisbane Hellenic	4–2	Merton Rovers

Brisbane

Brisbane Azzurri	1–0	Latrobe

Brisbane

Hobart Olympia	3–2	Launceston Juventus

Darcy Street, Hobart

Hobart Rangers	1–0	Ulverstone

Ulverstone Showgrounds, Ulverstone

Adelaide Juventus	6–0	Adelaide Polonia

Adelaide

Adelaide Budapest	3–0	Adelaide Croatia

Adelaide

== Round 2 ==
29 September 1963
15:00 AEST

APIA Leichhardt	2–0	South Coast United
Baumgartner 34'; Wong 48'	Report

Wentworth Park, Glebe
Attendance: 8,500
Referee: S. Pundyk

5 October 1963

Adelaide Juventus	3–1	Adelaide Budapest
Crawford 54'; Govelli 69'; Moriarty 84'		A. Zsuppan 81'

Thebarton Oval, Adelaide
Attendance: 4,200
Referee: Bill Hosie

5 October 1963

Port Melbourne Slavia	4–3 (a.e.t.)	Footscray JUST
Auchie (pen.); Palmer; Harper		Stankovic; Pejovic

Olympic Park Stadium, Melbourne

Toronto Awaba	2–3	Brisbane Hellenic

Crystal Palace, Wallsend

7 October 1963

Sydney Prague	2–1 (a.e.t.)	Pan Hellenic
Sherwin 7'; Badaracco 106'	Report	Logan 12'

Wentworth Park, Sydney
Attendance: 6,700
Referee: S. Pundyk

Brisbane Azzurri	1–0	Newcastle Austral

Brisbane

6 October 1963

Polonia Melbourne	0–0 (a.e.t.)	George Cross
Penalties
	4–3

Olympic Park Stadium, Melbourne

Hobart Olympia	5–1	Hobart Rangers

KGV Park, Glenorchy

== Quarter-finals ==
13 October 1963

Sydney Prague	5–2	Brisbane Hellenic

Wentworth Park, Sydney
Attendance: 2,100

13 October 1963

Brisbane Azzurri	0–3	Polonia Melbourne

Brisbane Exhibition Ground, Brisbane
Attendance: 7,300

13 October 1963

Port Melbourne Slavia	3–1	APIA Leichhardt

Olympic Park Stadium, Melbourne
Attendance: 11,000

12 October 1963

Adelaide Juventus	3–0	Hobart Olympia

Thebarton Oval, Adelaide
Attendance: 5,000

== Semi-finals ==
20 October 1963

Polonia Melbourne	3–1	Sydney Prague

Melbourne Showgrounds, Melbourne
Attendance: 10,500

19 October 1963

Port Melbourne Slavia	2–0	Adelaide Juventus

Thebarton Oval, Adelaide
Attendance: 6,500

== Third place playoff ==
27 October 1963

Sydney Prague	1–2	Adelaide Juventus

Wentworth Park, Sydney
Attendance: 2,000

== Final ==
27 October 1963

Port Melbourne Slavia	0–0	Polonia Melbourne

Olympic Park Stadium, Melbourne
Attendance: 12,500
Referee: Tony Boskovic

=== Replay ===
3 November 1963

Port Melbourne Slavia	3–2 (a.e.t.)	Polonia Melbourne
Des Palmer 81', 85', 104'	Report	Wieslaw Janczyk 19' (pen.); Michael Jurecki 61'

Olympic Park Stadium, Melbourne
Attendance: 9,000
Referee: Tony Boskovic
