= Henryk Gronowski =

Polish association football player

Personal information
- Full name: Henryk Teodor Gronowski
- Birth name: Heinrich Theodor Gruner
- Date of birth: 9 March 1928
- Place of birth: Gliwice, Germany
- Date of death: 10 May 1977 (aged 50)
- Place of death: Warsaw, Poland
- Height: 1.81 m (5 ft 11 in)
- Position: Goalkeeper

Youth career
- Dynas Gliwice

Senior career*
Years	Team	Apps	(Gls)
1946–1948	Piast Gliwice		
1949–1961	Lechia Gdańsk	209	(0)
1961–1962	Polonia Melbourne		
1962–1963	Polonia Sydney		
1963–1969	Lechia Gdańsk	49	(0)
Total		258	(0)

International career
1957	Poland	1	(0)

Managerial career
- Ogniwo Sopot
- –1977: Gedania Gdańsk
- * Club domestic league appearances and goals

Henryk Teodor Gronowski (born Heinrich Theodor Gruner; 9 March 1928 – 10 May 1977) was a Polish professional football player and manager. He spent the majority of his career with Lechia Gdańsk, before going on to have brief spells in management. His brother, Robert Gronowski was also a former professional footballer who played as a forward.

== Early years ==
Having been born in Gliwice in 1928, which was then in Germany, Henryk was born as Henryk Gruner. He later changed his last name in 1949 to the more Polish sounding Gronowski.

== Senior career ==
After World War II, Gronowski joined the newly established football team of his birth city Piast Gliwice, which had now been integrated into Poland. In 1949, Gronowski joined Lechia Gdańsk with his older brother, Robert. Gronowski spent a total of 12 seasons at Lechia, playing over 200 games in all competitions. In 1961, Gronowski moved to Australia to play for Polonia Melbourne and Polonia Sydney, teams created by Polish nationals who had moved to Australia. After two seasons away, Gronowski once again returned to Lechia Gdańsk and spent a further six years with the club. In total, Gronowski spent 18 seasons at Lechia and made 273 appearances in all competitions.

== International career ==
On 3 November 1957, Gronowski played for Poland in what turned out to be his only international appearance. He played against Finland in a 4–0 win, keeping a clean sheet for his country.

== Managerial career ==
After his playing career had finished Gronowski fully went into management. He took charge firstly of Ogniwo Sopot, before going on to manage Gedania Gdańsk until his death in 1977.

== Personal life ==
Gronowski is commemorated by a star at the MOSiR Stadium in Gdańsk. The "Avenue of Stars" commemorates the efforts and success of former players and coaches.
