= Western Eagles FC =

Western Eagles F.C.
- Full name: Western Eagles Football Club
- Nicknames: Polonia, Eagles
- Founded: 13 August 1950 as Polonia S.C.
- Ground: Polish Club, 19 Carrington Drive; Albion, Victoria
- Capacity: 1,500
- Chairman: Chris Janus
- League: Victorian State League 2 North–West
- 2026: 2nd of 12 (promoted), Victorian State League 1 North–West 2027
- Website: http://westerneaglesfc.com.au/
| Home colours | Away colours | Third colours |

Western Eagles FC is an Australian football (soccer) club based in the western suburbs of Melbourne, Victoria.

The club's foundation meeting was held on 13 August 1950, at 93 Brighton Road, St. Kilda Victoria. The meeting decided that the club would be known as "Polonia Sports Club".

Polonia SC was one of the powerhouses of Victorian and Australian soccer in the 1950s and 1960s, before making a brief revival in the 1980s. Western Eagles is currently in Victorian State League Division 1 and plays its home games at Carrington Drive, Albion.

== Club history ==
=== Foundation ===
The foundation meeting was held on 13 August 1950 at 93 Brighton Road, St Kilda. The Meeting was an initiative of Zdzislaw Zabuski, Boleslaw Mlewski, Jacek Wyszogrodzki and the Polish Association in Victoria. The first committee was elected on 27 August 1950 and consisted of Wladyslaw Kowalik – President, Wiktor Kwiatkowski – Hon. Secretary, Franek Skowronski – Treasurer, Kazimierz Zielinski – Team Manager, Boleslaw Mlewski – Coach, Mieczyslaw Terlikowski – Team Manager. The meeting decided that the club would be named Polonia Sports Club.

Club Presidents 1950–1970

=== The early years ===
"Polonia" being Latin for Poland and the colours of white and red adopted. Polonia played its first game in September 1950, against JUST(Division 3 Champions and holders of the Australian World Cup) and defeated them 4:3. The club's first official league game took place at Williamstown Racecourse, on 7 April 1951 defeating Geelong United 3:1. It was the beginning of a meteoric climb and the beginning of the golden fifties and sixties for the club. Polonia became 4th Division Champions in their first season of existence in 1951, and 3rd Division Champions in 1952 winning the league without dropping a single point ! In 1953 Polonia finished Division 2 Runners-up winning promotion to Division 1, and becoming World Cup Champions. This feat came within a run of 40 league matches unbeaten from 7 April 1951 to 30 May 1953. Players who starred in these early days and will be remembered by many were Stefan Czauderna and Boleslaw Zablocki, pivot for the Victorian team that played the touring England team in 1951 at the Melbourne Cricket Ground. Stasek Galecki was the best left wing in the State of Victoria at the time, and Augus Dziura, a fine goal scoring center forward.

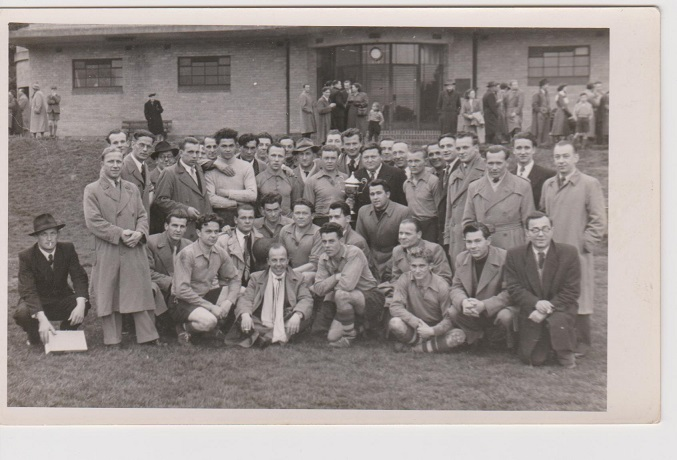
End of 1951 season photograph at Williamstown Racecourse

By 1954 Polonia had climbed into the First Division, losing just one league game in 3 years. It had taken only four years to get from the bottom to the top of the Victorian soccer pyramid structure.

The club reached the Dockerty Cup final for the first time in their history in 1955. The final played on 22 October, at Ascot Vale ended with a 1:1 draw to Hakoah, with the opening goal from Polonia's Peter Schipperheyn in the 51-minute. The side lost the Cup final replay 2:0 on 5 November.

During its early years the club was fortunate to secure services of Zdzislaw Zabuski, an engineer and businessman, and one of the club's most loyal supporters, who provided employment for many of the Polonia players. His knowledge of local conditions proved extremely useful. Mr Zabuski was elected club president in 1951.

Julian Chrzanowski was one of the club's first committee members and players. Mr Chrzanowski was a member of the Polish Resistance in World War II, before he was captured and send to Auschwitz concentration camp. He barely survived and was offered the chance to migrate to Australia or the United States. He arrived to Australia in 1949. He became the foundation member of Polonia. He played in the club's first game, and was a member of the championship teams of 1951 and 1952.

W.R.Thomas, President of Victorian Soccer Football Association, was one of Polonia's most influential and noteworthy supporters. He recalls in 1951, prior to taking the Victoria State team on tour of New Zealand, arranging with Polonia club president Zdzislaw Zabuski, to play a trial game against the newly formed Polonia Soccer Club. He was shocked when the lowly and newly formed fourth-division team soundly beat his Touring team 7:1. He then became one of the club's greatest followers. His son, Brian, was a playing member of Polonia's first team, representing the club in the 1954 season, debuting in Division One.

In 1956, during the Melbourne Olympic Games, Polonia officials met visiting members of the Polish Olympic Committee to discuss opportunities for Polish players to come to Melbourne. Around this time, Ted Lezon joined the club, while Dr. Charles Walker, then club president, maintained contacts in Poland. According to the source, a conversation during a gathering of Polish Olympic officials contributed to discussions about recruiting Polish footballers to the club.

Dr. Charles Walker was a Polish doctor born in Lviv, Poland. Dr Walker arrived in Australia just before the Second World War, and as a doctor was part of the Australian Army Force that saw combat against the Japanese in Papua New Guinea. Dr Walker began his work with the club in 1950 as a medical volunteer. By 1952 he was elected club president, a role he fulfilled in the following years; 1953, 1955–1956, 1958–1963.

On 13 June 1959, the first five of a long line of Polish stars arrived in Melbourne. They were Roch Dronia, Ryszard Szczepanski, Kaz Szygalski, Marian Gasior and Wieslaw Janczyk.

=== The highlight era ===
The highlight era in the club's history was the 1960s. In the season of 1960 and 1961 Polonia won back to back State League Championship, and became 1961 Dockerty Cup Winners, beating George Cross 4:2 in the Final on 7 October, at Olympic Park, with goals from Zygmund Gross, Zdzislaw Maruszkiewicz and a brace from Mieczyslaw Jurecki. This most successful side in the club's history also won the prestige "World Cup" tournament. Some of the most influential players of that time were; Mieczyslaw Jurecki, Wieslaw Janczyk, Wieslaw Gamaj, Zdzislaw Maruszkiewicz, Jerzy Dudon, Charlie Morks, Marian Gasior, Remo Guardiani, Ryszard Szczepanski, Roch Dronia, Kazimierz Szygalski, Zygmunt Gross, Henryk Gronowski, Ference Voros. President of Polonia SC at that time was Dr. Charles Walker. Our club also had representatives at international level. Players that had the honor to represent the Australian national team were George Pittoni, Lolly Vella and Robert Wemyss. Mieczyslaw Jurecki and Kazimierz Kowalec had the opportunity to play in the Australian "B" team. There were a number of players that were Poland's national team representatives: Wieslaw Janczyk, Edward Jankowski, Zygmunt Gadecki, Norbert Gajda, Henryk and Robert Gronowski, Mieczyslaw Jurecki, Edmund Zientara.

Photograph of the 1960 State League Championship team at Olympic Park

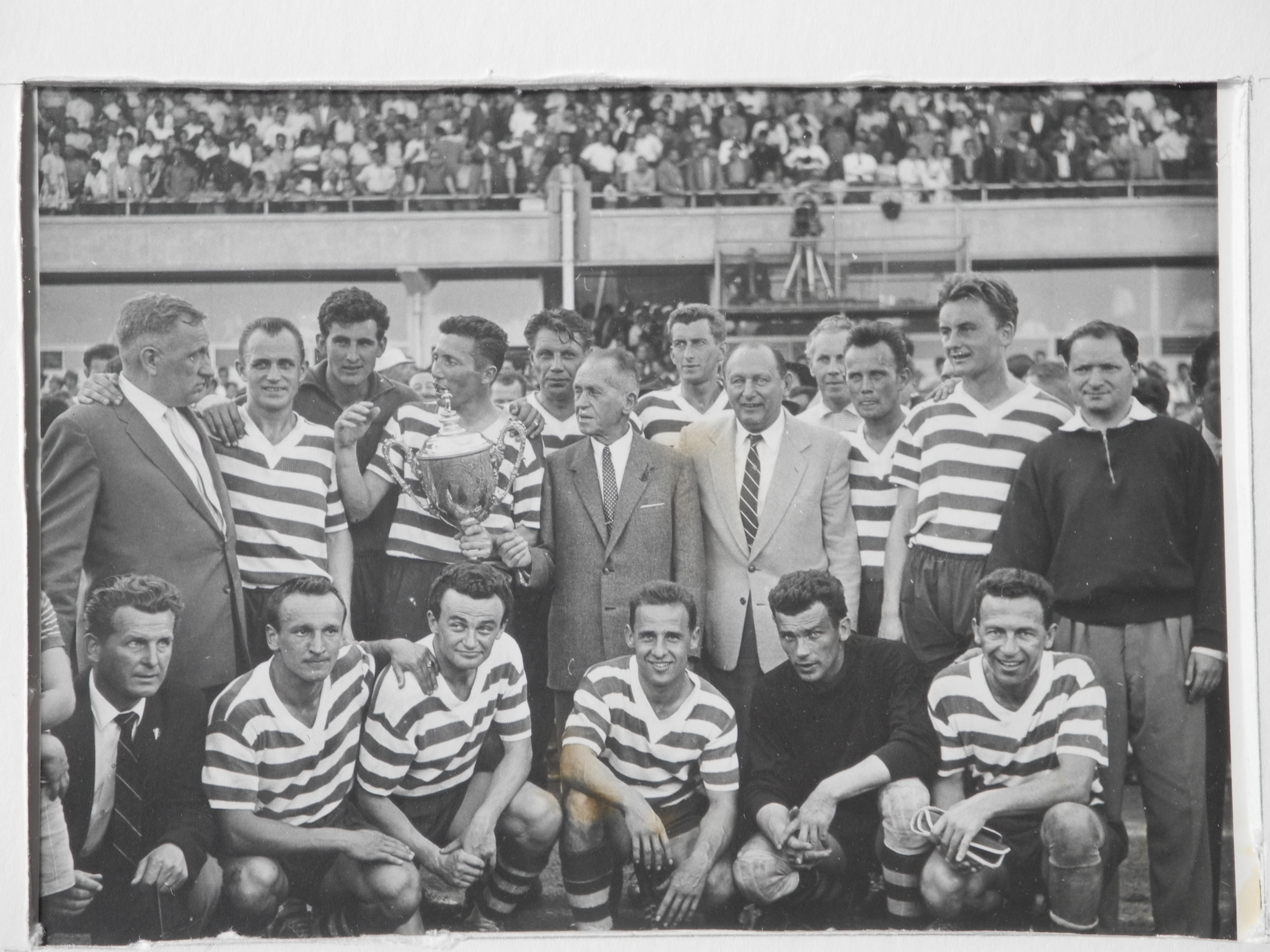
Dockerty Cup Fnal at Olympic Park Melbourne, 7 October 1961

In 1963 Polonia finished Runners-up in three competitions. In the Victorian State League, they were two points behind JUST, taking just 3 points in their final four games. The State League Leading Goalscorer that season was Edward Jankowski with 21 goals. That same year, Polonia lost in the Final of the Dockerty Cup to ... JUST, losing 2:4 at Olympic Park. The team also lost in the Final of Australia Cup, which was the first national club tournament in the country, initiated in 1962. The 1963 final was contested by two Melbourne clubs, with Slavia Melbourne beating Polonia 3:2 in a replay, after a scoreless draw in the first game. In the final replay, Des Palmer scored a hat-trick for the winners. On its way to the final Polonia faced Adelaide Juventus, George Cross, Brisbane Azzuri, and Sydney Prague in the semi-final, winning 3:1. Polonia did manage to win the 1963 Ampol Cup, pre-season competition, beating South Melbourne Hellas in the Final.The 1968 season saw Polonia finish second in the league behind Croatia with 26 points.

Polonia finished bottom of the 1976 season, with no teams relegated from the 1976 Victorian State League. South Melbourne Hellas, Footscray J.U.S.T., Mooroolbark United and Fitzroy United Alexander entered the National Soccer League in 1977. The team did reach the Dockerty Cup final, losing 0:2 to Footscray J.U.S.T.

In 1981, 20 years after winning their last league title, Polonia finally topped the Victorian Metropolitan League Division 1, clinching a place back in the State League after a 4-year absence. The outstanding players of that team were Leszek Dzielakowski, Richard Lipiarski, Marian Jaworski, John Wallace, Greg Gamanski, Brendon Lakic, Tadeusz Krysinski, Peter Chapnik, Richard Sekulski, Stan Klain, Michael Pichner, Dave Gibson and Alex Marshall. In charge of the team was Kaz Kowalec, a former great player himself.

Stefan Mila was awarded the 1983 Victorian State League Gold Medal – Player of the Year Award. Polonia finished the league in sixth place. On February 26, 1984 Polonia beat Box Hill 3:1 in The Buffalo Cup Final, which was a pre-season competition, sponsored by Buffalo Sports and played by State League teams. However, they finished a season-long title battle as runners-up to Morwell Falcons by three points. Polonia forward Janusz Przybyla was the State League's top Goalscorer netting 23 goals, despite been out injured for five games. On 4 November Polonia were defeated 3:2 after extra time in the 1984 Dockerty Cup Final against Fawkner.

In 1987 Maribyrnong Polonia won its third Victorian State Championship. Polonia started their season in the State League with an unbeaten run of results in their first seven league matches, starting with a 3:0 win on the opening day against Western Suburbs at Ralph Street Reserve. The team finished on top of the league with 42 points, three points ahead of Green Gully. The club's woes began the following season. Due to poor management of the club's finances and by overpaying most of its players, the club had no choice but to start selling its best players. From 1989 to 1992 Polonia suffered successive relegations.

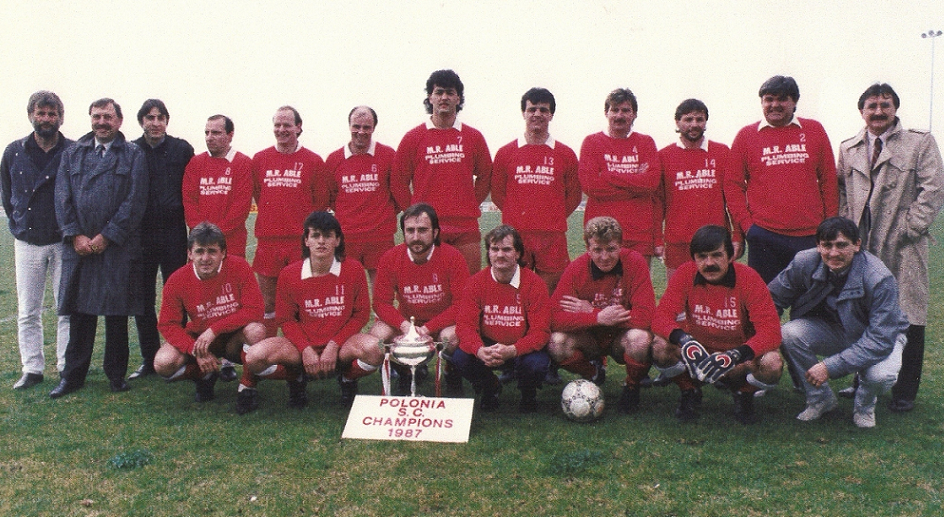
Maribyrnong Polonia - 1987 State League Champions

Polonia has always been a force to contend with in Victorian Soccer circles and has won countless titles. Polonia won the Victorian Championship on three occasions, in the seasons of 1960, 1961 and 1987. During that era Polonia have had many rivalries. The rivalries have been with fellow State League sides Brunswick Zebras, St.Kilda Hakoah, Footscray JUST, George Cross and South Melbourne Hellas.

=== 1998–2019 New Home ===
Since 1998 Polonia is known as Western Eagles Football Club, changing its club name from Sunshine Heights, which the club has been known as from 1991, after the move to the club's new home at Albion, a privately-owned venue based in the western suburbs of Melbourne. The name "Polonia" was dropped as a requirement of the Victorian Soccer Federation to shed their ethnic appeal, in 1992.

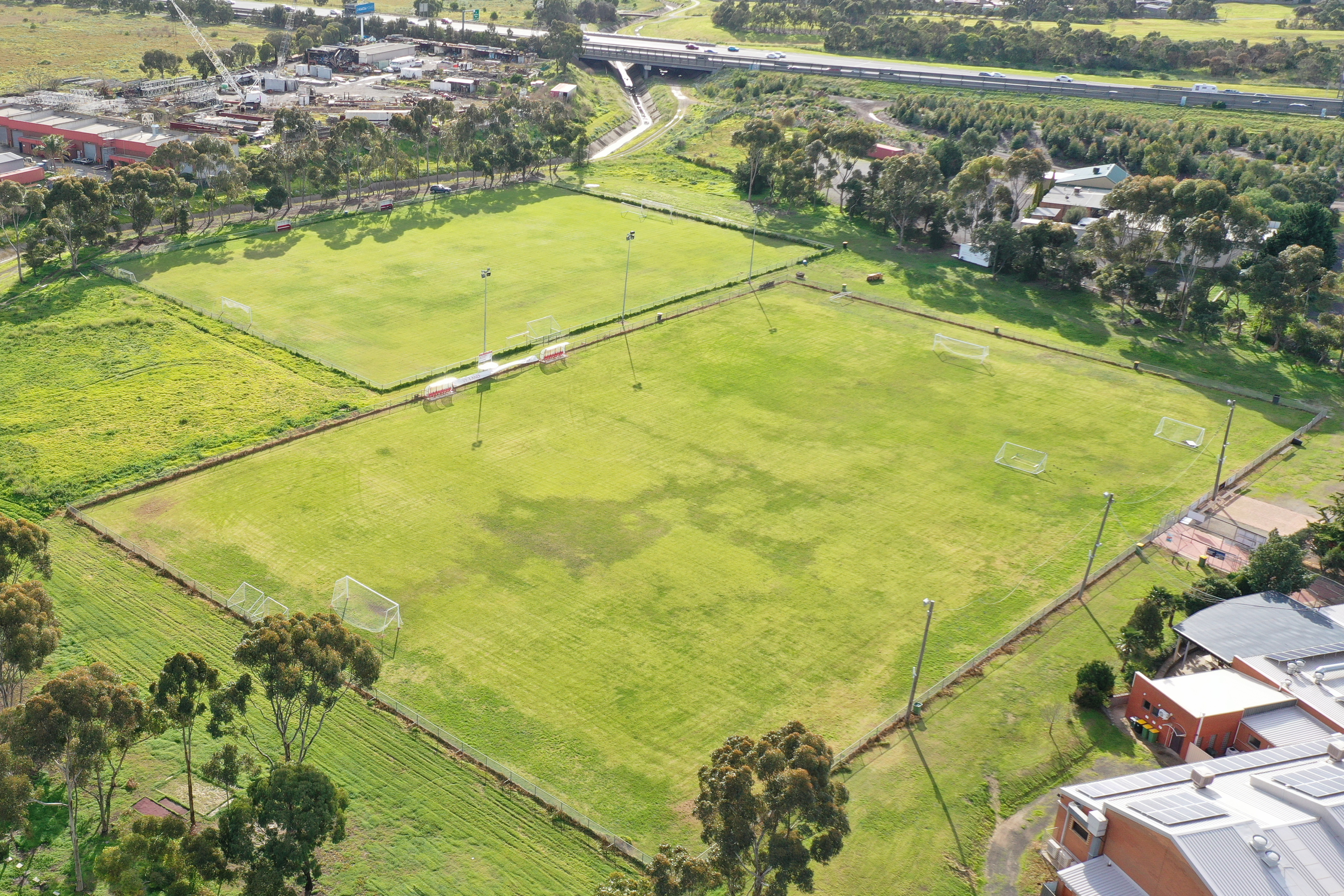
Polish Club – 19 Carrington Drive, Albion

One of the darkest chapters in the club's history was the disastrous merger venture with Melbourne City. For reasons not known or understood to this day by many supporters, the club's committee made a decision to merge with and compete as Melbourne City in the Victorian State League Division 1 in the 1999 season. In the 2000 season, due to the legacy of that merger, Western Eagles found themselves in the Victorian Provisional League Division 3. With new club president Darren Bednarski, who embeded new life to the club. With the appointment of Leszek Dzielakowski as head coach, the club started a brief revival, with three promotions in five years, rising from Provisional League Division 3 to Victorian State League Division 3, finishing in 8th position in the 2005 season, under coach Milorad Gelic. This was the first year the club was in charge by the new club president, Tadeusz Ziegler. In this period the club won its first league Championship in 16 years, topping the Victorian Provisional League Division 2 in 2003 on 46 points, 5 points ahead of Ballarat. Polonia supporters gathered in numbers for fixtures against Avondale Heights, Ballarat, Brimbank, Geelong Rangers, Sydenham Park and Werribee City during the 2000-2006 timeframe. Players who were most involved in that period were; Darren Bednarski, Ivan Devcic, Paul Dzielakowski, Wojciech Galon, Kamil Gamanski, Andrew Gurman, Konrad Leski, Lukasz Lewinski, Adam Mostowski, Alex Samayoa, Marek Szczepanski and Slawomir Zientara.

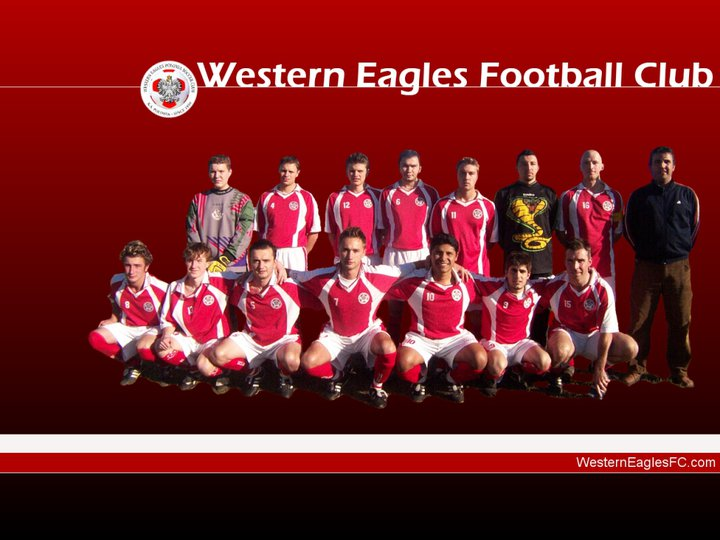
Western Eagles 2005

The 2006 season began with the departures of many first squad players from previous seasons, the like of Slawomir Zientara, Blerton Belica, Kamil Gamanski, Nikolce Simovski, Pero Prodanovic, Marcin Goralczyk, Andrew Gurman, Alex Samayoa and Dominic Murdaca, all moving to other clubs or retiring from football, and with the move of head coach Milorad Galic to second division club Westgate, the 2006 season was disastrous. The start of the season saw a first matchday humiliation to La Trobe University. On April 1, Western Eagles began the season with a 3:2 away victory against La Trobe, only to find out few days later the FFV awarded the win to La Trobe University 3-0, as Western Eagles fielded an ineligible player (red card from previous season). The club was hit by crisis after crisis, coaching changes and a player walkout, which saw the club relegated back to Provisional League.

Wojciech Laskowski was elected club president in 2010, the year the club was celebrating its 60th year of existence. The team coached by Sinisa Opacic became Provisional League 2 champions, topping the league table with 44 points. On 6 August 2011 the club organised a 60th-anniversary gala where the Eagles had over 200 supporters gather, with former greats and the current team members at the Polish Sport and Recreation Centre. They spoke about legends of years past, relived the glory years and discuss the current club situation.

Following the revival of the club in 2000, the club had a dynamic and controversial figure amongst its ranks, a former player himself, Mark Szpakolski. The likes of Joe Gorczynski, Janusz Przybyla, Leszek Dzielakowski and Wladyslaw Pejko, who were supporting the club by providing constructive and influence to new members involved. In addition, the supportive role of Steve Janus, one of club's major sponsors for more than 15 years and club president in 2008–2009.

The club's head coach for the 2013 and 2014 season was Srecko Baresic-Nikic, a former professional player himself in Europe. He, together with the club committee and players, planned to bring Western Eagles back on the Victorian football map. The 2013 season Eagles finished 5th on the table with 32 points, and still manage to win promotion to Division 3 due to the new competition format for state level football in Victoria, ending the season with a 3:1 win over league champions Corio. The team also had a solid run in the 2013 edition of the FFV State Knockout Cup were the club reached Round 5, going down to Preston Lions 1:2, after an entertaining game at Albion. The team played throughout the 2013 season facing many injury problems, giving a chance to play many of the club's youth players, one of them being Thomas Deng, who in 2014 signed with the A-League Club Melbourne Victory and made his first international appearance for Australia Under-20 side. Deng made his senior football debut for Western Eagles against Williamstown. Kacper Hubiak became the club's top goalscorer for the fourth consecutive season, with 15 goals, first player to do so in the club's 63-year history. Despite a solid start to the 2014 season where Eagles were sitting in second position in the table after Round 8 with 16 points, the team had a disappointing end to the year losing the last 4 games, including a crushing 8:1 defeat in round 20 to the league champions Essendon Royals. It was the third biggest league defeat in the club's history.

At the beginning of the 2016 season the club committee and its junior players, was presented with a cheque from Hyundai Australia as part of the "Goals For Grassroots" program. The presentation took place at Etihad Stadium before the A-League fixture between Melbourne Victory and Western Sydney Wanderers. A dismal run of form saw the team slip to the bottom of the league table with only 6 points from its opening 10 games of the 2016 season. The Eagles rally in the second half of the season to finished in 10th place with 23 points. The side's relegation was confirmed by a lost in the relegation playoff to FC Strathmore 1:0, by a way of a penalty kick in the first half, on 24 September, at Paisley Park.

On 15 July 2017 the club's 1500th league game celebration took place at Albion. On this historic occasion the team under Daniel Krasic responded and made the club proud with a 2:1 win over Altona North, courtesy of a Matthew Lodkowski and Jack Karyakos goals. On the day the club's oldest player Stefan Czauderna (90) who walked out with our youngest junior player, lead the senior team out to the pitch. Members of local government and Brimbank Council, Honorable Consul for the Republic of Poland – Dr George J. Luk, Secretary of the SPK Victoria – Bogdan Platek, club members, former players and coaches, sponsors and supporters, all gathered to celebrate the club's achievement. Polonia finished the season in 8th place.

The club appointed Patrick Mangion as the new coach during the 2018 pre-season, who replaced Danny Krasic in mid March. After a 1:1 draw against Altona North in round 4, Eagles won nine games in a row. During this time they secured first position and held it for the remainder of the season. Western Eagles managed to secure the State League 4 Championship of the 2018 season after only 18 rounds. Eagles claimed the title in front of their home fans on 4 August, beating Truganina Hornets 2:1, having come from being 1:0 down: Matthew Lodkowski equalized in the 69th minute of the game and Stefan Dimeski scored the winner three minutes before full-time. Matthew Lodkowski became the leading goalscorer in State League Division 4 with 32 goals for the season, surpassing Janusz Przybyla tally of 23 (State League), and making him Western Eagles highest goalscorer in a single season. Western Eagles won the 2018 Division 4 season with a nine-point margin.

=== 2020–2025 75 Years ===
On October 2019, the club announced Steve Iosifidis. as the new senior coach for the 2020 season. Iosifidis a former professional player, back-to-back NSL titles winner with South Melbourne under Ange Postecoglou. All Victorian football competitions in 2020 were cancelled due to the impacts from the COVID-19 pandemic in Australia. The 2021 season Eagles were sitting in second place, just two points behind league leaders Upfield, when a decision was taken and the Victorian football season once again was being disrupted due to the impacts from the COVID-19 pandemic in Australia, with the season being suspended from August 2021 from government-imposed lockdowns, with promotion and relegation suspended.

The 2023 season was an extremely tight one, with only 5 points separating second and sixth at the conclusion of the regular season. Western Eagles stormed home with 6 wins from its final 10 matches to finish fourth, only four points behind the runners-up Craigieburn City.

On 7 April 2024, it was announced that Legia Warsaw Soccer School is coming to Western Eagles FC in July and run a week-long camp. After months of hard work behind the scenes between Legia Warsaw, Western Eagles FC and Polonia Sports Club Sydney, with help from Marcin Góralczyk and Kamil Siwik, Poland's biggest soccer club will visit Polish Club Albion and run a week-long camp for 50 young players. Legia send two coaches, Tomasz Babel and Szymon Lesiakowski to lead the July 1-5 camp. Western Eagles committee headed by Peter Marmura would work close with Adam Biziuk - President of Polonia Sports Club from Sydney, partnering together to ensure that the camp could run in Melbourne and Sydney as a first of many more to come. That season Western Eagles went on to win the 2024 Victorian State League Division 3, winning promotion to State League Division 2 for the first time since 1991. The Eagles under coach Paul Falzon finished the season four points clear of Williamstown SC and Altona North.Western Eagles lost to St Kilda 0-1 in the 2024 Victorian Men's State League Division 3 Grand Final, on 14 September at Bundoora.

Western Eagles played their first game in the State League Second Division on 22 March 2025, at home to Altona East Phoenix, and lost 0:3. After losing first three games of the league season, despite these setbacks, Eagles overcame their winless start to eventually achieve some commendable results, in particular a 1–0 win over Lalor United and finished in 6th place with 31 points. Western Eagles Football Club marked a monumental milestone on Saturday, 20 September 2025 celebrating its 75th anniversary in an event attended by 300 people at Albion. The 75th Anniversary celebration was an unforgettable evening filled with music, food, trophies, and heartfelt speeches. Past players, club legends, families, and supporters all come together to honor 75 incredible years of history and community spirit. On the night, Western Eagles All-time team was announced to honour the best club football players of the 75th anniversary. The team was consisted of an twenty-four-member side, with two goalkeeper, seven defenders, eight midfielders, and seven forwards. Additional awards for coach, team manager and club physio were also announced.

| All-time team | Goalkeepers | Defenders | Midfielders | Forwards |
|---|---|---|---|---|
| | Henryk Gronowski, Leszek Dzielakowski | Richard Lipiarski, Jan Gawlik, Edward Marmur, Tadeusz Rachwalski, Zdzislaw Maruszkiewicz, Lukasz Lewinski, Marian Gasior | Stefan Mila, Jerzy Dudon, Andrew Czapnik, Wieslaw Janczyk, Michael Olinowski, Peter Czapnik, Bogdan Bonk, Adam Mostowski | Mieczyslaw Jurecki, Janusz Przybyla, Zygmunt Gadecki, Czeslaw Plaskota, Tadeusz Krysinski, Robert Chelchowski, Matthew Lodkowski |

| All-time team | Coaches | Team Managers | Physio |
|---|---|---|---|
| | Wieslaw Janczyk, Kazimierz Kowalec | Mark Szpakolski, Wally Klain | Wladyslaw Piejko |

=== 2026-current ===
On August 29, the Eagles locked in a top-three finish in the second-last round of the FV state league 2 north-west 2026 season, after a difficult game against Corio, but a brace from second half substitute Connor Bencich secured the points and promotion into state 1 for season 2027. The coaching staff led by Paul Falzon and his team put in all the hard work on and off the park. This is an achievement with 2 promotions in the last 4 years having Falzon lead the Eagles as senior coach.

== Club name changes ==
| Name | Period |
|---|---|
| Polonia | 1950–1972 |
| Maribyrnong Polonia | 1973–1990 |
| Sunshine Heights Polonia | 1991–1992 |
| Sunshine Heights | 1993–1997 |
| Western Eagles | 1998–present |

== Honours ==
=== League ===
- Victorian State League

Champions (3): 1960, 1961, 1987
Runners-Up (4) : 1955, 1963, 1968, 1984

- Victorian State League Division 1

Champions (1) : 1981
Runners-Up (1) : 1979

- Victorian State League Division 2

Runners-Up (1) : 1953

- Victorian State League Division 3

Champions (2) : 1952, 2024

- Victorian State League Division 4

Champions (2) : 1951, 2018

- Victorian Provisional League 2 (North-West)

Champions (2) : 2003, 2010

- Victorian Provisional League 3 (North-West)

Runners-Up (1) : 2000

=== Cup ===
National

- Australia Cup

Runners-up (1) : 1963

State

- Dockerty Cup

Winners (1) : 1961
Runners-Up (4) : 1955, 1963, 1976, 1984

- State League Cup

Winners (1) : 1960

- Ampol Cup

Winners (2) : 1963, 1964

- Buffalo Cup

Winners (1) : 1984

- Laidlaw World Cup

Winners (2) : 1953, 1961

- Armstrong Cup

Winners (3) : 1957, 1959, 1973

=== Women ===
- Victorian Women's State League Division 2

Champions (1) : 2012
Runners-up (1) : 2011

- Victorian Women's State League Division 3

Champions (1) : 2008

- Victorian Women's State League Division 4

Champions (1) : 2023

- Victorian Women's State League Division 5

Runners-Up (1) : 2022

- Victorian Women's Metropolitan League (North-West)

Runners-up (1) : 2007

== Individual honours ==
Victorian State League Gold Medal – Player of the Year

- 1983 – Stefan Mila

Bill Fleming Medal

- 1956 – Robert Wemyss
- 1960 – Wieslaw Janczyk

Sporting Globe Medal

- 1960 – Wieslaw Janczyk
- 1961 – Mieczyslaw Jurecki
- 1962 - Stanislaw Szklarek

Victorian Provisional League 2 Best & Fairest

- 2002 - Alex Samayoa

Victorian State League Leading Goal Scorer

- 1961 – Mieczyslaw Jurecki 17 goals
- 1963 – Edward Jankowski 21 goals
- 1984 – Janusz Przybyla 23 goals

Victorian State League Division 1 Leading Goal Scorer

- 1981 - Tadeusz Krysinski 14 goals

Victorian State League Division 3 Leading Goal Scorer

- 1952 - Julian Chrzanowski

Victorian State League Division 4 Leading Goal Scorer

- 1951 - Julian Chrzanowski
- 2018 - Matthew Lodkowski 32 goals

== International Representatives ==
- (Australia) Thomas Deng
- (Australia) George Pittoni
- (Australia) Danny Tiatto
- (Australia) Lolly Vella
- (Australia) Robert Wemyss
- (Poland) Janusz Baran
- (Poland) Zygmunt Gadecki
- (Poland) Norbert Gajda
- (Poland) Henryk Gronowski
- (Poland) Robert Gronowski
- (Poland) Wiesław Jańczyk
- (Poland) Edward Jankowski
- (Poland) Zdzislaw Kostrzewa
- (Poland) Eugeniusz Lerch
- (Poland) Edmund Zientara

== Notable Former Coaches ==
- (Poland) Wieslaw Janczyk 1960–61, 1965–66
- (Poland) Edmund Zientara 1964
- (Australia) (Poland) Kazimierz Kowalec 1968–1972, 1980–82
- (Poland) Eugeniusz Lerch 1975–76
- (Australia) (Poland) Edward Widera 1978, 2009
- (Australia) (Poland) Leszek Dzielakowski 1983, 1989, 2000–01, 2016
- (Australia) (Israel) Miron Bleiberg 1986–87
- (Australia) (Poland) Janusz Przybyla 1988–1990, 1998, 2002
- (Australia) Milorad Gelic 2005, 2014
- (Australia) (Croatia) Srecko Baresic – Nikic 2013–14
- (Australia) (Greece) Steve Iosifidis 2020–2022

== Club Presidents ==
| Name | Year |
|---|---|
| Wladyslaw Kowalik | 1950 |
| Zdzislaw Zabuski | 1951 |
| Dr. Charles Walker | 1952–53, 1955–56, 1958–63 |
| Victor Ertel | 1957 |
| Marian Zarzycki | 1964–66, 1968–71 |
| Janusz Klimecki | 1967 |
| Basil Sowacki | 1972–73, 1975 |
| George Kerry | 1974 |
| Wladyslaw Suwinski | 1975–77 |
| George Pater | 1978 |
| Mieczyslaw Zurek | 1979–1985, 1994 |
| Richard Makarucha | 1986–88 |
| Tadeusz Lezon | 1989–90, 1992 |
| Joe Gorczynski | 1991–92 |
| Henry Dressler | 1993 |
| Miroslaw Rybak | 1995–97 |
| Wally Klain | 1998 |
| John Pater | 1999 |

| Name | Years |
|---|---|
| Darren Bednarski | 2000–02 |
| Tadeusz Ziegler | 2003–06 |
| Adam Drahan | 2007, 2015 |
| Steve Janus | 2008–09 |
| Wojciech Laskowski | 2010–14, 2016 |
| Adam Jaskulowski | 2017 |
| Kerri Popczyk | 2018–19 |
| Darek Lodkowski | 2020–23 |
| Peter Marmura | 2024-25 |
| Chris Janus | 2026 |

== Western Eagles Divisional history ==
| Season | League | Tier | Position | Games | Wins | Draws | Losses | GF | GA | Points |
|---|---|---|---|---|---|---|---|---|---|---|
| 1951 | Victorian Division 4 | 4 | 1 | 14 | 13 | 1 | 0 | 70 | 5 | 27 |
| 1952 | Victorian Division 3 | 3 | 1 | 18 | 18 | 0 | 0 | 89 | 8 | 36 |
| 1953 | Victorian Division 2 | 2 | 2 | 18 | 13 | 4 | 1 | 66 | 16 | 30 |
| 1954 | Victorian Division 1 | 1 | 3 | 18 | 8 | 6 | 4 | 36 | 24 | 22 |
| 1955 | Victorian Division 1 | 1 | 2 | 18 | 12 | 5 | 1 | 45 | 22 | 29 |
| 1956 | Victorian Division 1 | 1 | 4 | 18 | 9 | 5 | 4 | 55 | 22 | 23 |
| 1957 | Victorian Division 1 | 1 | 8 | 18 | 8 | 2 | 8 | 36 | 32 | 18 |
| 1958 | Victorian State League | 1 | 6 | 22 | 10 | 4 | 8 | 45 | 36 | 24 |
| 1959 | Victorian State League | 1 | 6 | 22 | 8 | 7 | 7 | 37 | 31 | 23 |
| 1960 | Victorian State League | 1 | 1 | 22 | 16 | 5 | 1 | 54 | 20 | 37 |
| 1961 | Victorian State League | 1 | 1 | 22 | 16 | 3 | 3 | 51 | 19 | 35 |
| 1962 | Victorian State League | 1 | 8 | 22 | 9 | 3 | 10 | 30 | 29 | 21 |
| 1963 | Victorian State League | 1 | 2 | 22 | 13 | 6 | 3 | 63 | 21 | 32 |
| 1964 | Victorian State League | 1 | 6 | 22 | 10 | 6 | 6 | 46 | 25 | 26 |
| 1965 | Victorian State League | 1 | 8 | 22 | 7 | 7 | 8 | 19 | 24 | 21 |
| 1966 | Victorian State League | 1 | 8 | 22 | 7 | 5 | 10 | 24 | 26 | 19 |
| 1967 | Victorian State League | 1 | 9 | 22 | 7 | 2 | 13 | 41 | 45 | 16 |
| 1968 | Victorian State League | 1 | 2 | 22 | 9 | 8 | 5 | 29 | 25 | 26 |
| 1969 | Victorian State League | 1 | 8 | 22 | 8 | 4 | 10 | 22 | 37 | 20 |
| 1970 | Victorian State League | 1 | 8 | 22 | 8 | 4 | 10 | 34 | 43 | 20 |
| 1971 | Victorian State League | 1 | 7 | 22 | 9 | 4 | 9 | 21 | 26 | 22 |
| 1972 | Victorian State League | 1 | 9 | 22 | 7 | 3 | 12 | 26 | 38 | 17 |
| 1973 | Victorian State League | 1 | 8 | 22 | 7 | 4 | 11 | 16 | 28 | 18 |
| 1974 | Victorian State League | 1 | 10 | 22 | 7 | 3 | 12 | 24 | 27 | 17 |
| 1975 | Victorian State League | 1 | 10 | 22 | 5 | 6 | 11 | 16 | 36 | 16 |
| 1976 | Victorian State League | 1 | 12 | 22 | 2 | 5 | 15 | 20 | 44 | 9 |
| 1977 | Victorian State League | 1 | 12 | 22 | 2 | 4 | 16 | 21 | 47 | 8 |
| 1978 | Victorian Metropolitan League Division 1 | 2 | 3 | 22 | 11 | 4 | 7 | 24 | 19 | 26 |
| 1979 | Victorian Metropolitan League Division 1 | 2 | 2 | 22 | 11 | 7 | 4 | 39 | 19 | 29 |
| 1980 | Victorian Metropolitan League Division 1 | 2 | 3 | 22 | 11 | 4 | 7 | 27 | 18 | 26 |
| 1981 | Victorian Metropolitan League Division 1 | 2 | 1 | 22 | 16 | 3 | 3 | 53 | 23 | 35 |
| 1982 | Victorian State League | 1 | 5 | 26 | 11 | 7 | 8 | 47 | 37 | 29 |
| 1983 | Victorian State League | 1 | 6 | 26 | 10 | 6 | 10 | 38 | 35 | 26 |
| 1984 | Victorian State League | 1 | 2 | 26 | 15 | 7 | 4 | 64 | 37 | 37 |
| 1985 | Victorian State League | 1 | 6 | 26 | 10 | 7 | 9 | 35 | 29 | 27 |
| 1986 | Victorian State League | 1 | 12 | 26 | 6 | 7 | 13 | 23 | 30 | 19 |
| 1987 | Victorian State League | 1 | 1 | 28 | 18 | 6 | 4 | 43 | 23 | 42 |
| 1988 | Victorian State League | 1 | 12 | 30 | 10 | 6 | 14 | 41 | 42 | 26 |
| 1989 | Victorian State League | 1 | 16 | 30 | 3 | 4 | 23 | 19 | 76 | 10 |
| 1990 | Victorian State League Division 1 | 2 | 12 | 26 | 4 | 12 | 10 | 33 | 41 | 20 |
| 1991 | Victorian State League Division 2 | 3 | 15 | 30 | 7 | 6 | 17 | 23 | 64 | 20 |
| 1992 | Victorian State League Division 3 | 4 | 13 | 28 | 8 | 6 | 14 | 33 | 50 | 22 |
| 1993 | Victorian State League Division 4 | 5 | 7 | 28 | 12 | 5 | 11 | 32 | 32 | 29 |
| 1994 | Victorian State League Division 4 | 5 | 8 | 28 | 11 | 5 | 12 | 42 | 41 | 27 |
| 1995 | Victorian State League Division 4 | 5 | 7 | 26 | 11 | 7 | 8 | 39 | 31 | 37 |
| 1996 | Victorian State League Division 4 | 5 | 4 | 26 | 15 | 3 | 8 | 55 | 27 | 48 |
| 1997 | Victorian State League Division 4 | 5 | 4 | 26 | 15 | 5 | 6 | 58 | 30 | 50 |
| 1998 | Victorian State League Division 4 | 5 | 10 | 26 | 7 | 8 | 11 | 40 | 48 | 29 |
| 1999 | | Merged with and competed as Melbourne City | | | | | | | | |
| 2000 | Victorian Provisional League Division 3 N/W | 7 | 2 | 22 | 14 | 7 | 1 | 61 | 32 | 49 |
| 2001 | Victorian Provisional League Division 2 N/W | 6 | 3 | 22 | 12 | 6 | 4 | 46 | 18 | 42 |
| 2002 | Victorian Provisional League Division 2 N/W | 6 | 4 | 22 | 10 | 8 | 4 | 53 | 29 | 38 |
| 2003 | Victorian Provisional League Division 2 N/W | 6 | 1 | 22 | 13 | 7 | 2 | 44 | 16 | 46 |
| 2004 | Victorian Provisional League Division 1 N/W | 5 | 3 | 22 | 10 | 8 | 4 | 44 | 31 | 38 |
| 2005 | Victorian State League Division 3 N/W | 4 | 8 | 22 | 8 | 6 | 8 | 37 | 37 | 30 |
| 2006 | Victorian State League Division 3 N/W | 4 | 12 | 22 | 3 | 1 | 18 | 13 | 55 | 10 |
| 2007 | Victorian Provisional League Division 1 N/W | 5 | 7 | 22 | 8 | 6 | 8 | 31 | 32 | 30 |
| 2008 | Victorian Provisional League Division 1 N/W | 5 | 8 | 22 | 8 | 5 | 9 | 38 | 33 | 29 |
| 2009 | Victorian Provisional League Division 1 N/W | 5 | 11 | 22 | 5 | 4 | 13 | 23 | 35 | 18 |
| 2010 | Victorian Provisional League Division 2 N/W | 6 | 1 | 22 | 14 | 5 | 3 | 41 | 19 | 44 |
| 2011 | Victorian Provisional League Division 1 N/W | 5 | 11 | 22 | 6 | 3 | 13 | 32 | 39 | 21 |
| 2012 | Victorian Provisional League Division 2 N/W | 6 | 8 | 22 | 8 | 5 | 9 | 33 | 39 | 28 |
| 2013 | Victorian State League Division 4 W | 5 | 5 | 22 | 9 | 5 | 8 | 35 | 27 | 32 |
| 2014** | Victorian State League Division 3 N/W | 5 | 6 | 21 | 7 | 5 | 9 | 30 | 32 | 26 |
| 2015 | Victorian State League Division 3 N/W | 5 | 6 | 22 | 8 | 5 | 9 | 28 | 35 | 29 |
| 2016 | Victorian State League Division 3 N/W | 5 | 10 | 22 | 7 | 2 | 13 | 32 | 44 | 23 |
| 2017 | Victorian State League Division 4 W | 6 | 8 | 22 | 6 | 7 | 9 | 30 | 43 | 25 |
| 2018 | Victorian State League Division 4 W | 6 | 1 | 20 | 17 | 2 | 1 | 70 | 22 | 53 |
| 2019 | Victorian State League Division 3 N/W | 5 | 9 | 22 | 6 | 6 | 10 | 29 | 37 | 24 |
| 2020 | Victorian State League Division 3 N/W | Season cancelled due to COVID-19 | | | | | | | | |
| 2021** | Victorian State League Division 3 N/W | 6 | 2 | 14 | 10 | 0 | 4 | 31 | 18 | 30 |
| 2022 | Victorian State League Division 3 N/W | 6 | 9 | 22 | 6 | 7 | 9 | 30 | 36 | 25 |
| 2023 | Victorian State League Division 3 N/W | 6 | 4 | 22 | 10 | 7 | 5 | 36 | 29 | 36 |
| 2024 | Victorian State League Division 3 N/W | 6 | 1 | 22 | 14 | 5 | 3 | 48 | 19 | 47 |
| 2025 | Victorian State League Division 2 N/W | 5 | 6 | 22 | 9 | 4 | 9 | 32 | 31 | 31 |
| 2026 | Victorian State League Division 2 N/W | 5 | 3 | 22 | 11 | 3 | 8 | 43 | 31 | 36 |
| 2027 | Victorian State League Division 1 N/W | 4 | | | | | | | | |

| Champions | Runners-up | Promoted | Relegated |

- Total games played 1673 – W 709 – D 370 – L 594 GF 2824 GA 2337 in 74 seasons
- Divisional History source from OzFootball.net (1951–2010)

**2014 season Northern Roosters withdrew mid-season with all teams playing 21 games.
**2021 season suspended from August 2021 from government-imposed COVID-19 lockdowns. Promotion and relegation was suspended.

== League participation ==
As of the 2027 season.

| Tier | Years | Seasons |
|---|---|---|
| I | 1954-77, 1982-89 | 32 |
| II | 1953, 1978-81, 1990 | 6 |
| III | 1952, 1991 | 2 |
| IV | 1951, 1992, 2005-06, 2027 | 5 |
| V | 1993-98, 2004, 2007-09, 2011, 2013-16, 2019, 2025-26 | 18 |
| VI | 2001-03, 2010, 2012, 2017-18, 2021-24 | 11 |
| VII | 2000 | 1 |

Level 1 on the Victorian league system was the Victorian Division 1 from 1909 to 1957, Victorian State League from 1958 to 1990, Victorian Premier League from 1991 to 2013. In 2014, the first-tier Victorian Premier League was rebranded as the National Premier Leagues (NPL). The introduction of the NPL 1 (later renamed to NPL 2) competition resulted in the VSL becoming the third-highest Victorian competition. A further change to the pyramid structure occurred in 2020 with the establishment of NPL 3, making the VSL the fourth-highest Victorian competition.

- Australian football (soccer) league system

== All-time table ==
| League | number of seasons | total games | Win | Draw | Loss | GF | GA |
|---|---|---|---|---|---|---|---|
| State League* | 32 | 730 | 287 | 161 | 282 | 1121 | 1036 |
| State/Division 1 | 5 | 114 | 53 | 30 | 31 | 176 | 120 |
| State/Division 2 | 4 | 92 | 40 | 17 | 35 | 164 | 142 |
| State/Division 3 | 12 | 257 | 105 | 50 | 102 | 436 | 400 |
| State/Division 4 | 10 | 238 | 116 | 48 | 74 | 471 | 306 |
| Provisional League 1 | 5 | 110 | 37 | 26 | 47 | 168 | 170 |
| Provisional League 2 | 5 | 110 | 57 | 31 | 22 | 217 | 121 |
| Provisional League 3 | 1 | 22 | 14 | 7 | 1 | 61 | 32 |
| TOTAL | 74 | 1673 | 709 | 370 | 594 | 2824 | 2337 |

== League records against other league clubs 1951-2026 ==
| | Played | Wins | Draws | Losses | Goals F:A | First league meeting |
|---|---|---|---|---|---|---|
| Brunswick Zebras | 64 | 22 | 17 | 25 | 79:95 | 1954 |
| Ringwood City | 58 | 18 | 13 | 27 | 82:107 | 1957 |
| St.Kilda Hakoah | 50 | 14 | 12 | 24 | 72:88 | 1954 |
| Box Hill | 46 | 29 | 8 | 9 | 92:46 | 1954 |
| Footscray JUST | 46 | 14 | 14 | 18 | 65:70 | 1954 |
| George Cross | 44 | 15 | 9 | 20 | 52:60 | 1955 |
| Slavia Prahran | 42 | 17 | 11 | 14 | 53:43 | 1956 |
| Melbourne Hungaria | 36 | 14 | 12 | 10 | 50:34 | 1960 |
| South Melbourne | 34 | 9 | 6 | 19 | 44:59 | 1961 |
| Moreland City | 30 | 15 | 6 | 9 | 64:48 | 1954 |
| Williamstown | 28 | 8 | 7 | 13 | 37:45 | 1995 |
| Corio | 26 | 12 | 3 | 11 | 51:38 | 1992 |
| Melbourne Knights | 26 | 9 | 3 | 14 | 29:42 | 1962 |
| Fitzroy United Alexander | 24 | 14 | 5 | 5 | 50:26 | 1964 |
| Geelong Rangers | 24 | 12 | 5 | 7 | 39:26 | 1993 |
| Sunbury United | 24 | 8 | 6 | 10 | 35:42 | 1991 |
| Fawkner | 23 | 7 | 5 | 11 | 30:33 | 1983 |
| Brighton | 20 | 13 | 2 | 5 | 47:20 | 1954 |
| Albion Rovers | 20 | 12 | 3 | 5 | 32:22 | 1980 |
| Lions USC | 20 | 10 | 5 | 5 | 36:23 | 1962 |

== Records ==
- Best Result in the Victorian State League: 8–0 vs Brighton at Maribyrnong Reserve 29 March 1958, 8–0 vs South Melbourne Hellas at Middle Park Soccer Stadium 21 May 1983
- Worst Result in the Victorian State League : 0–9 vs Green Gully at Green Gully Reserve 27 August 1989
- Best Crowd in League Competition Victorian State League : 20,000 vs South Melbourne Hellas at Olympic Park 21 July 1963
- Best Result in the FFV State Knockout Cup/Dockerty Cup : 12–2 vs Pucka Rovers 30 August 1952
- Worst Result in the FFV State Knockout Cup/Dockerty Cup : 0–7 vs Frankston Pines at Polish Sports Centre Albion 12 February 1995
- Most Points in a Season : 53 points in 2018
- Most Wins in a Season : 18 wins in 1952 and 1987
- Most Goals in a Seasons : 89 goals in 1952
- Biggest Winning Streak : 28 games – from Round 7 1951 to Round 2 1953
- Biggest Losing Streak : 8 games – from Round 7 1986 to Round 14 1986
- Biggest Unbeaten Streak : 40 games – from Round 1 1951 to Round 8 1953

Biggest victories in the League
| Score | vs | Date |
|---|---|---|
| 11:0 | Monbulk | 7 June 1997 |
| 10:0 | Heidelberg | 26 May 1951 |
| 9:0 | Heidelberg | 14 April 1951 |
| 9:0 | Woodlands | 28 June 1952 |
| 9:1 | Footscray City | 21 July 1956 |
| 8:0 | White Eagles | 14 April 1952 |
| 8:0 | Fairfield | 2 August 1952 |
| 8:0 | Box Hill | 7 April 1956 |
| 8:0 | Brighton | 29 March 1958 |
| 8:0 | South Melbourne | 21 May 1983 |

Biggest losses in the League
| Score | Vs | Date |
|---|---|---|
| 0:9 | Green Gully | 27 August 1989 |
| 0:7 | Sandringham City | 25 May 1991 |
| 1:8 | Essendon Royals | 30 August 2014 |
| 0:6 | Hakoah | 29 May 1971 |
| 0:6 | Bentleigh Greens | 11 March 1991 |
| 0:6 | Clifton Hill | 27 April 1991 |
| 1:7 | Surf Coast | 11 September 2010 |

Highest scoring League games
| Goals | vs | Date | Score |
|---|---|---|---|
| 11 | Monbulk | 7 June 1997 | 11:0 |
| 10 | Heidelberg | 26 May 1951 | 10:0 |
| 10 | Footscray City | 21 July 1956 | 9:1 |
| 10 | West Preston | 9 July 2000 | 8:2 |
| 10 | Truganina Hornets | 12 May 2018 | 8:2 |
| 9 | Heidelberg | 14 April 1951 | 9:0 |
| 9 | Royal Caledonians | 17 May 1952 | 8:1 |
| 9 | Woodlands | 28 June 1952 | 9:0 |
| 9 | Moreland | 14 June 1958 | 2:7 |
| 9 | Green Gully | 27 August 1989 | 0:9 |
| 9 | Frankston Pines | 3 September 1989 | 5:4 |
| 9 | Westgate | 10 June 1990 | 4:5 |
| 9 | Corio | 14 May 2005 | 6:3 |
| 9 | Essendon Royals | 30 August 2014 | 1:8 |
| 9 | Westvale | 19 June 2021 | 8:1 |

Biggest victories in Australia/FFA/Dockerty Cup
| Score | vs | Date |
|---|---|---|
| 12:2 | Pucka Rovers | 30 August 1952 |
| 11:1 | Warrnambool Wolves | 9 March 2013 |
| 9:1 | Bayswater | 17 July 1954 |
| 8:1 | Williamstown | 18 July 1953 |
| 8:1 | Prahran | 4 August 1956 |

Biggest losses in Australia/FFA/Dockerty Cup
| Score | Vs | Date |
|---|---|---|
| 0:7 | Frankston Pines | 12 February 1995 |
| 0:6 | Moreland City | 14 March 2020 |
| 1:6 | Sydenham Park | 5 March 2022 |
| 0:5 | Prahran Slavia | 1 April 1979 |
| 0:4 | St Albans Saints | 11 March 1996 |
| 0:4 | Westvale | 8 March 2014 |

Biggest winning streak
| Games | From | To |
|---|---|---|
| 28 | Round 7 1951 | Round 2 1953 |
| 9 | Round 5 2018 | Round 14 2018 |
| 7 | Round 11 1961 | Round 17 1961 |
| 6 | Round 13 1960 | Round 18 1960 |
| 6 | Round 20 1960 | Round 3 1961 |
| 6 | Round 16 1981 | Round 21 1981 |

Biggest losing streak
| Games | From | To |
|---|---|---|
| 8 | Round 7 1986 | Round 14 1986 |
| 8 | Round 15 2006 | Round 22 2006 |
| 7 | Round 14 1967 | Round 20 1967 |
| 7 | Round 3 1977 | Round 9 1977 |
| 7 | Round 6 1989 | Round 12 1989 |
| 7 | Round 18 2014 | Round 3 2015 |

Biggest unbeaten streak
| Games | From | To |
|---|---|---|
| 40 | Round 1 1951 | Round 8 1953 |
| 18 | Round 8 1960 | Round 3 1961 |
| 17 | Round 13 2000 | Round 7 2001 |
| 16 | Round 11 1961 | Round 4 1962 |
| 15 | Round 4 1955 | Round 18 1955 |
| 14 | Round 1 2018 | Round 15 2018 |

== Western Eagles – Polonia – Championship Teams ==
| Year | Division | Players used |
|---|---|---|
| 1951 | Division 4 | 1. Stefan Czauderna, 2. Jan Mazurek, 3. Boleslaw Zablocki, 4. Augustyn Dziura, 5. Stanislaw Galecki, 6. Henryk Jakubowski, 7. Tadeusz Koszanski, 8. Tadeusz Bialek, 9. Emanuel Wolany, 10. Ludwik Cebula, 11. Jan Garcarczyk, 12. Mieczyslaw Terlikowski, 13. Julian Chrzanowski, 14. Stanislaw Bialas, 15. Stanislaw Grabski, 16. Jozef Kopacz, 17. Bronislaw Langiewicz, 18. Mikolaj Pavlov Coach Boleslaw Mlewski |
| 1952 | Division 3 | 1. Stefan Czauderna, 2.Jan Mazurek, 3. Boleslaw Zablocki, 4. Augustyn Dziura, 5. Stanislaw Galecki, 6. Henryk Jakubowski 7. Julian Chrzanowski, 8. Jozef Czerkiewicz, 9. Palka, 10. Zdenek, 11. Jan Zuraszek, 12. Jan Garcarczyk, 13 Lacko, 14. Tadeusz Bialek, 15. Jozef Kopacz Coach Boleslaw Mlewski |
| 1960 | State League | 1. John Morks, 2. Mieczyslaw Jurecki, 3. Kazimierz Szygalski, 4. Roch Dronia, 5. Jerzy Dudon, 6. Wieslaw Gamaj, 7. Ryszard Szczepanski, 8. Wieslaw Janczyk, 9. Zdzislaw Maruszkiewicz, 10. Remo Guardiani, 11. Marian Gasior, 12. Bruno Rueter, 13. Harry Capobus, 14. Anton Brkic, 15. Vince Parlatoni, 16. Henryk Jakubowski, 17. Bernard Biro Coach Wieslaw Janczyk |
| 1961 | State League | 1. John Morks, 2. Mieczyslaw Jurecki, 3. Kazimierz Szygalski, 4. Roch Dronia, 5. Jerzy Dudon, 6. Wieslaw Gamaj, 7. Ryszard Szczepanski, 8. Wieslaw Janczyk, 9. Zdzislaw Maruszkiewicz, 10. Remo Guardiani, 11. Marian Gasior, 12. Henryk Gronowski, 13. Robert Gronowski, 14. Ference Voros, 15. Zygmunt Gross, 16.Mike Terlikowski, 17.Bruno Reuter, 18 Anton Brkic Coach Wieslaw Janczyk |
| 1981 | Metropolitan League Division 1 | 1. Leszek Dzielakowski (22/0), 2. Richard Lipiarski (22/0), 3. Marian Jaworski (22/0), 4. Joe Herman (9/0), 5. John Wallace (22/5), 6. Greg Gamanski (19/1), 7. Andrew Czapnik (4/1), 8. Chris Gerick (11/0), 9. Brendan Lakic (22/14), 10. Tadeusz Krysinski (20/14), 11. Peter Chapnik (22/7), 12. Richard Sekulski (19/4),13. Stan Klain (15/0), 14. Micheal Pichner (17/1), 15. Tadeusz Rachwalski (2/0), 16. Alex Marshall (12/4) Coach Kazimierz Kowalec (Games played / Goals scored ) |
| 1987 | State League | 1. Zdzislaw Kostrzewa (12/0), 2. Richard Lipiarski (28/0), 3. Gerry Bennett (28/0), 4. Aki Kotzamichaelis (28/3), 5. Greg Warszawski (17/9), 6. Peter Chapnik (25/4), 7. Jan Wycislik (27/5), 8. Gordan Flavell (24/0), 9. Brendan Lakic (26/3), 10. Kees Storm (28/11), 11. Miroslaw Smolarek (22/0), 12. Joe Kiss (16/0), 13. Rob Nelson (28/0), 14. Alex Marshall (17/4), 15 Janusz Baran (12/0), 16 Steve Chetcuti (5/0), 17 Paul Drinoczky (3/0), 18 Leszek Gregorczuk (3/0), 19 Janusz Przybyla (1/0), 20 Bobby Stojcevski (1/0), 21 Luke Ognenovski (1/0) Coach Miron Bleiberg (15), Rob Nelson (13) (Games played / Goals scored ) |
| 2003 | Provisional League Division 2 | 1. Slawomir Zientara (18/0), 2. Andrew Jezard (13/0), 3. Marek Szczepanski (16/2), 4. Lukasz Lewinski (19/0), 5. Eric Zsembrey (17/1), 6. Alex Samayoa (22/4), 7. Andrew Gurman (8/2), 8. Kamil Gamanski (17/5), 9. Ivan Devcic (20/13) 10. Wojciech Galon (22/2), 11. Konrad Leski (17/10), 12. Adam Dachs (4/0), 13. Andrew Najda (9/0), 14. Milton Lopez (7/0), 15. Mark Tassone (14/0), 16. Fortunato Lariccia (11/0), 17. Piotr Marmura (8/1), 18. Tomasz Wierzbicki (17/1), 19. Andrew Mottram (5/0), 20. Ante Lanzaneo (13/1), 21. Krzysztof Grabowski (3/0), 22. Mateusz Kowalski (3/0), 23. Krzysztof Slodyczka (1/0) Coach Nino Comegna (Games played / Goals scored ) |
| 2010 | Provisional League Division 2 | 1. Marek Klek, 2. Lukasz Galon, 3. Charles Mizzi, 4. Adam Melideo, 5. Darko Dukic, 6. Adrian Purganic, 7. Andrew Donato, 8. Mateusz Kowalski, 9. Kacper Hubiak, 10. Wojciech Galon, 11. Robert Chelchowski, 12. John Strycharski, 13. Owen Sacco, 14. Robert Rubinich, 15. Adrian Kozulin, 16. Lukasz Lewinski, 17. Maciej Slodyczka, 18. Phillip Mucha, 19. Konrad Leski Coach Sinisa Opacic |
| 2018 | Division 4 | 1.Akim Abdul, 2.Charles Mizzi, 3.Dion Portelli, 4.John Roberts, 5.Marcel Pedersen, 6.Murray Haining, 7.Mateusz Kowalski, 8.Jack Karyakos, 9.Robert Chelchowski, 10.Matthew Lodkowski, 11.Stefan Dimeski, 12.Kane Manicaro, 13.Juan Igic, 14.Michael Luzar, 15.Maciej Slodyczka, 16.Lukasz Lewinski, 17.Benjamin Michael, 18.Sebastian Miekus, 19.Ange Soumbassis,20.Maciej Sztendur, 21.Max Perrins, 22.Lukasz Kopij, 23.Matuesz Slodyczka, 24.Haron Abdulovski, 25.Oktay Oztekin Coach Patrick Mangion |
| 2024 | Division 3 | 1.Marc O'Rourke, 2. Mikhael Reid, 3. Dane Garbett, 4. Connor Bencich, 5. Joel Pilcher, 6. Gordan Jozeljic, 7. George Dioudis, 8. Malik Furlong, 9. Kacper Hubiak, 10. Matthew Napoli, 11. Konrad Dobraszkiewicz, 12. Nicholas Blicharz, 13. Teddy Negrit, 14. Damon Todorov, 15. Christopher Coleman, 16. Timothy Williams, 17. Matthew Sirgiovanni, 18.Ryan Comito, 19. Jeremy Vun,20. Juan Ramirez, 21.Antonio Komso, 22. Matthew Lodkowski, Coach Paul Falzon |

1960

== Cup Competition ==
| Season | Competition | Round | Club | Score |
|---|---|---|---|---|
| 1951 | Dockerty Cup | R2 | International Harvesters | 3:1 |
| | | R3 | JUST | 1:3 |
| 1952 | Dockerty Cup | R2 | Melbourne University | w/o |
| | | R3 | Pucka Rovers | 12:2 |
| | | QF | JUST | 3:1 |
| | | SF | Juventus | 2:6 |
| 1953 | Dockerty Cup | R2 | APM Maryvale | 5:3 |
| | | R3 | Williamstown | 8:1 |
| | | QF | Northcote | 5:0 |
| | | SF | Hakoah | 1:2 |
| 1954 | Dockerty Cup | R2 | Park Rangers | 6:3 |
| | | R3 | Bayswater | 9:1 |
| | | QF | JUST | 0:1 |
| 1955 | Dockerty Cup | R2 | Park Rangers | 1:0 |
| | | R3 | Prahran | 7:1 |
| | | QF | Box Hill | 2:2, 3:0 |
| | | SF | Wilhelmina | 1:1, 4:2 |
| | | Final | Hakoah | 1:1, 0:2 |
| 1956 | Dockerty Cup | R2 | Geelong | 5:0 |
| | | R3 | Prahran | 8:1 |
| | | QF | Wilhelmina | 4:2 |
| | | SF | Brighton | 1:1, 1:2 |
| 1957 | Dockerty Cup | R2 | Yallourn | 3:2 |
| | | R3 | Brighton | 1:0 |
| | | QF | Hakoah | 2:1 |
| | | SF | Moreland | 1:2 |
| 1958 | Dockerty Cup | R5 | Brighton | 4:1 |
| | | QF | Juventus | 1:2 |
| 1959 | Dockerty Cup | R5 | Juventus | 2:4 |
| 1960 | Dockerty Cup | R5 | Slavia Port Melbourne | 1:0 |
| | | QF | Box Hill | 5:0 |
| | | SF | Juventus | 2:3 |
| 1961 | Dockerty Cup | R5 | Footscray Capri | 2:2, 5:0 |
| | | QF | JUST | 6:3 |
| | | SF | Wilhelmia | 1:0 |
| | | Final | George Cross | 4:2 |
| 1962 | Dockerty Cup | R1 | Croatia | 2:1 |
| | | GR | Juventus | 2:1 |
| | | GR | Hakoah | 0:2 |
| | | GR | JUST | 1:0 |
| | | SF | George Cross | 0:2 |
| 1963 | Australia Cup | R2 | George Cross | 0:0 p. 4:3 |
| | | QF | Brisbane Azzurri | 3:0 |
| | | SF | Sydney Prague | 3:1 |
| | | Final | Slavia Port Melbourne | 0:0 |
| | | Final | Slavia Port Melbourne | 2:3 a.e.t. |
| | Dockerty Cup | R1 | Austria | 6:1 |
| | | GR | Slavia Port Melbourne | 3:2 |
| | | GR | Juventus | 3:3 |
| | | GR | South Melbourne Hellas | 2:1 |
| | | SF | Croatia | 2:0 |
| | | Final | JUST | 2:4 |
| 1964 | Dockerty Cup | R5 | Lions | 4:0 |
| | | QF | South Melbourne Hellas | 1:3 |
| 1965 | Dockerty Cup | R5 | Makedonia | 0:2 |
| 1966 | Dockerty Cup | R5 | Lions | 4:2 |
| | | QF | Juventus | 0:0, 3:1 |
| | | SF | Hakoah | 2:3 |
| 1967 | Dockerty Cup | R5 | St Albans | 7:0 |
| | | QF | Slavia Port Melbourne | 1:1, 0:2 |
| 1968 | Dockerty Cup | R5 | Dandenong City | 1:2 |
| 1969 | Dockerty Cup | R5 | Ringwood City Wilhelmina | 2:3 |
| 1970 | Dockerty Cup | R5 | South Melbourne | 1:2 |
| 1971 | Dockerty Cup | R5 | Box Hill | 2:2, 0:0, 1:1, 2:1 |
| | | R6 | Keilor City | 0:2 |
| 1972 | Dockerty Cup | R1 | George Cross | 1:2 |
| 1973 | Dockerty Cup | R1 | Box Hill | 0:1 |
| 1974 | Dockerty Cup | R1 | Mooroolbark | 0:3 |
| 1975 | Dockerty Cup | R1 | Fitzroy United Alexander | 2:2, 1:3 |
| 1976 | Dockerty Cup | R1 | Keilor Austria | 2:0 |
| | | R2 | Juventus | 1:0 |
| | | QF | Box Hill | 4:0 |
| | | SF | Essendon Lions | 1:0 |
| | | Final | Footscray JUST | 0:2 |
| 1977 | Dockerty Cup | R1 | Port Melbourne | 6:0 |
| | | R2 | Frankston City | 2:1 |
| | | QF | Preston | 2:3 |
| 1978 | Dockerty Cup | R1 | Geelong | 2:3 |
| 1979 | Dockerty Cup | R1 | Footscray JUST | 3:0 |
| | | R2 | Frankston Pines | 1:0 |
| | | Quarter-final | Prahran Slavia | 0:5 |
| 1980 | Dockerty Cup | R1 | Park Rangers | 2:1 |
| | | R2 | Green Gully | 1:1, pen. |
| 1981 | Dockerty Cup | R1 | Couburg | 2:0 |
| | | R2 | Green Gully | 1:2 |
| 1982 | Dockerty Cup | R1 | Port Melbourne | 5:1 |
| | | R2 | Albions Rovers | 1:2 |
| 1983 | Dockerty Cup | R1 | Preston Makedonia | 6:1 |
| | | R2 | Morwell Falcons | 1:5 |
| 1984 | Dockerty Cup | R1 | Altona City | 5:0 |
| | | R2 | South Oakleigh | 2:1 |
| | | QF | Box Hill | 3:2 |
| | | SF | Thomastown | 5:4 |
| | | Final | Fawkner | 2:3 |
| 1985 | Dockerty Cup | R1 | Broadmeadows | 3:2 |
| | | R2 | Morwell Falcons | 0:3 |
| 1986 | Dockerty Cup | R1 | North Dandenong | 1:2 |
| 1987 | Dockerty Cup | R1 | Northcote City | 0:2 |
| 1988 | Dockerty Cup | R1 | Mordialloc | 1:0 |
| | | R2 | Fawkner | 4:1 |
| | | R3 | Heidelberg United | 1:2 |
| 1989 | Dockerty Cup | R1 | Heidelberg City | 2:1 |
| | | R2 | Morwell Falcons | 1:3 |
| 1990 | Dockerty Cup | R1 | Melbourne JUST | 0:3 |
| 1991 | Dockerty Cup | R1 | Bulleen | 0:2 |
| 1992 | Dockerty Cup | R1 | Corio | 2:3 |
| 1995 | Dockerty Cup | GR | Darebin United | 1:2 |
| | | GR | Frankston Pines | 0:7 |
| | | GR | Nunawanding City | 2:2 |
| 1996 | Dockerty Cup | GR | Glenroy | 5:0 |
| | | GR | Altona East | 0:2 |
| | | GR | St Albans Saints | 0:4 |

| Season | Competition | Round | Club | Score |
|---|---|---|---|---|
| 2004 | Dockerty Cup | R1 | Caulfield United | 2:2, p. 4:3 |
| | | R2 | Brimbank | 0:1 |
| 2011 | Mirabella Cup | R1 | Werribee City | 0:3 |
| 2012 | FFV State Knockout Cup | R1 | Altona North | 2:3 |
| 2013 | FFV State Knockout Cup | R2 | Warrambool Wolves | 11:1 |
| | | R3 | Sebastopol Vikings | 4:2 |
| | | R4 | Hoppers Crossing | 1:1, p. 4:2 |
| | | R5 | Preston Lions | 1:2 |
| 2014 | Dockerty Cup | R2 | Westvale | 0:4 |
| 2015 | FFA Cup | R2 | Middle Park | 1:0 |
| | | R3 | Corio | 0:3 |
| 2016 | FFA Cup | R2 | St Kevin's Old Boys | 0:2 |
| 2017 | FFA Cup | R1 | Glen Waverley | 4:3 |
| | | R2 | Monash University | 0:3 |
| 2018 | FFA Cup | R1 | Melbourne University | 2:0 |
| | | R2 | Cairnlea FC | 2:5 aet |
| 2019 | FFA Cup | R1 | Lalor United | 0:2 |
| 2020 | FFA Cup | R2 | Westvale | 3:0 w/o |
| | | R3 | Moreland City | 0:6 |
| 2021 | FFA Cup | R2 | Ashburton United | 3:0 |
| | | R3 | Doncaster Rovers | 1:2 |
| 2022 | Dockerty Cup | R2 | North Caulfield FC | 3:2 |
| | | R3 | Sydenham Park | 1:6 |
| 2023 | Dockerty Cup | R2 | Sebastopol Vikings | 0:1 |
| 2024 | Dockerty Cup | R1 | St Albans Gospic Bears | 6:0 |
| | | R2 | Spring Gully United | 3:1 |
| | | R3 | Doncaster Rovers | 7:1 |
| | | R4 | Knox City | 2:1 |
| | | R5 | Hoppers Crossing | 2:2 p.1:3 |
| 2025 | Dockerty Cup | R2 | Wyndham FC | 3:0 w/o |
| | | R3 | Yarra Jets FC | 6:1 |
| | | R4 | Mill Park | 1:5 |
| 2026 | Dockerty Cup | R2 | Dandenong South | 2:1 |
| | | R3 | Clifton Hill | 2:1 aet |
| | | R4 | Avondale FC | 2:3 |

== Cup Finals ==
=== Dockerty Cup ===
| Year | Champion | Runner up | Score | Goal Scorer | Polonia Lineup | Venue | Crowd |
|---|---|---|---|---|---|---|---|
| 1955 | Hakoah | Polonia | 2:0 | J.Gottesman 60, R.Piercy 85 | Stefan Czauderna, Harry Capobus, Henryk Jakubowski; Bob Wemyss, Bill Lawrie, Stanislaw Plekan, Andrew Czerkaski, Robert Strahan, Peter Schipperheyn, John Backley, Jim Johnson | Showgrounds, Ascot Vale | 6500 |
| 1961 | Maribyrnong Polonia | George Cross | 4:2 | M.Jurecki (2) Z.Gross Z.Maruszkiewicz (Polonia) SG: B.Copeland (2) (George Cross) | Henryk Gronowski, Robert Gronowski, Marian Gasior, Wieslaw Janczyk, Zdzislaw Maruszkiewicz, Richard Szczepanski, Jerzy Dudon, Zygmunt Gross, Mieczyslaw Jurecki, Wieslaw Gamaj, Roch Dronia | Olympic Park | 5000 |
| 1963 | Footscray JUST | Maribyrnong Polonia | 4:2 | I.Pikl 40, 66 T.Stankovic 80 M.Pejovic 85 (JUST) M.Jurecki 77 E.Jankowski 83 (Polonia) | Bruno Putkowski, Marian Gasior, Richard Szczepanski, Wieslaw Janczyk, Zygmunt Gross, Jerzy Dudon, Micheal Mroczkowski (Sent off), Edward Jankowski, Mieczyslaw Jurecki, Edmund Zientara, Roch Dronia | Olympic Park | 6000 |
| 1976 | Footscray JUST | Maribyrnong Polonia | 2:0 | Palinkas 2, Buljevic 80 | Larry Ostrowsky, Stan Klain, Marian Jaworski, Eddie Marmur, Barney Klimecki, Andrew Czapnik, George Nierobicz, Ricky Lipiarski (John Dykun 71'), Michael Borucinski (Ralph Esposito 56'), Joe Herman, Hugh Humphrey.Coach: John Grimsey. | Olympic Park | |
| 1984 | Fawkner | Maribyrnong Polonia | 3:2 a.e.t. | N.Garvey 13, P.Boyle 32, F.MacLeod 93 (Fawkner) C.Fattore 40og, D.McCluskey 79 (Polonia) | Mike Fryszer, Richard Lipiarski, Miroslaw Smolarek, John Gardiner, Danny McCluskey, Nick Kolaric (Leszek Gregorczuk 99), Carl Gilder, Dave Gibson, George Petrov, Joe Tront, Noel Mitten. Coach: John Gardiner. | Olympic Park | |

=== 1963 Australia Cup Final ===
| Date | Champion | Runner up | Score | Goal Scorer | Polonia Lineup | Venue | Crowd |
|---|---|---|---|---|---|---|---|
| 27/10/1963 | Slavia Port Melbourne | Polonia | 0:0 | | Bruno Putkowski, Ryszard Sczepanski, Kaz Szygalski, Wieslaw Janczyk, Ziggy Gross, Jackie Dudon, Roch Dronia, Eddie Jankowski, Mike Jurecki, Edmund Zientara, Lolly Vella | Olimpic Park, Melbourne | 12,500 |
| 3/11/1963 | Slavia Port Melbourne | Polonia | 3:2 | Palmer 81, 85, 104 (Sla) Janczyk 19 pen, Jurecki 61 (Pol) | Bruno Putkowski, Ryszard Sczepanski, Kazimierz Szygalski, Wieslaw Janczyk, Ziggy Gross, Jackie Dudon, Lolly Vella, Edward Jankowski, Mieczyslaw Jurecki, Edmund Zientara, Stefan Katolik | Olimpic Park, Melbourne | 9000 |

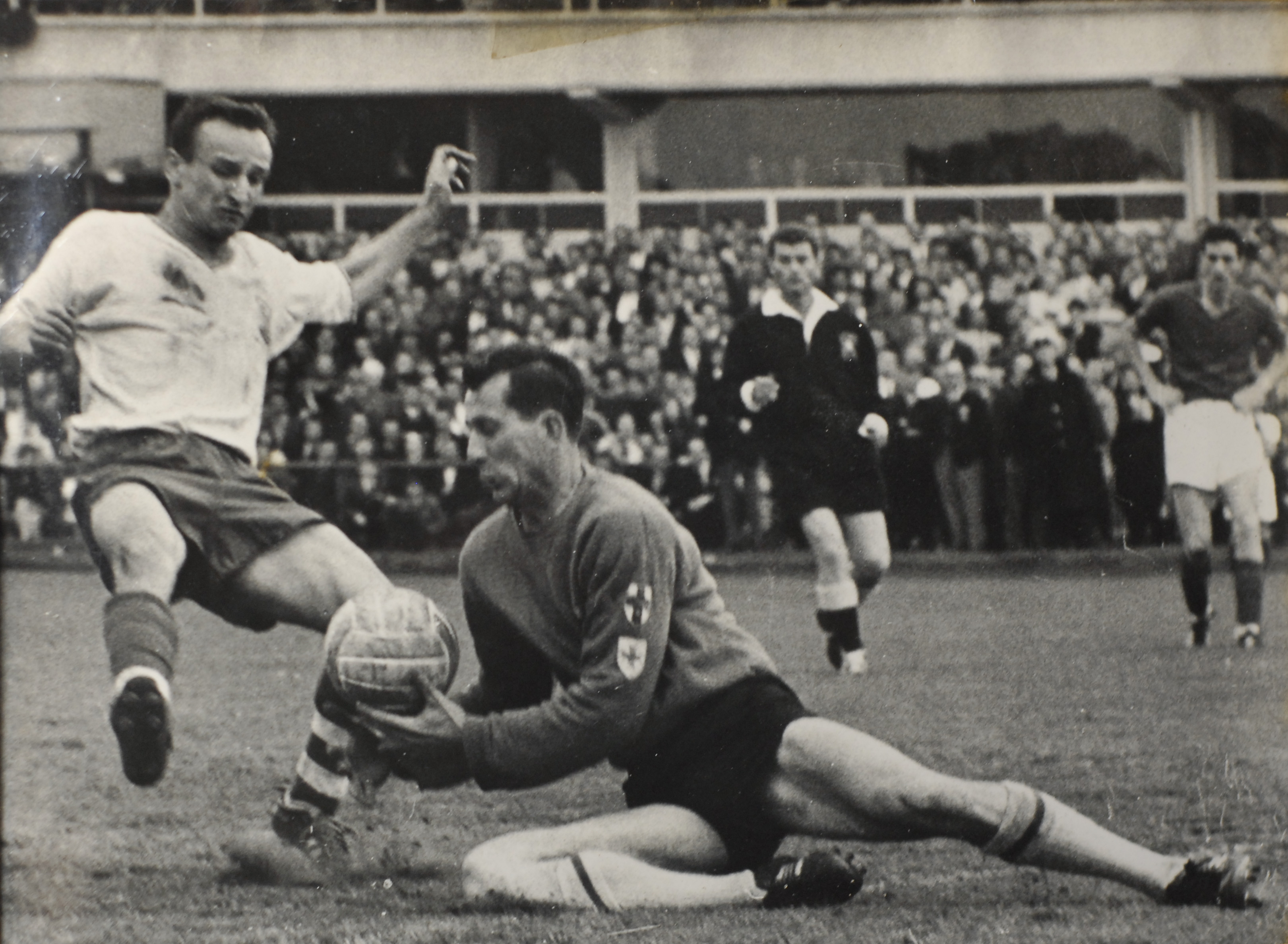
Stefan Katolik (Polonia) and Ray Barotajs (Slavia)

== Top Goal Scorers ==
- 1951 Julian Chrzanowski
- 1952 Julian Chrzanowski
- 1953 Harry Capobus/Stan Plekan
- 1954 unknown
- 1955 Peter Schipperheyn 14
- 1956 George Pittoni 18
- 1957 N. von Nagy 8
- 1958 unknown
- 1959 Enzo Bottari/Roch Dronia 5
- 1960 Mieczyslaw Jurecki 12
- 1961 Mieczyslaw Jurecki 17
- 1962 Robert Gronowski 6
- 1963 Edward Jankowski 21
- 1964 Kazimierz Kowalec 13
- 1965 Kazimierz Kowalec/Czeslaw Plaskota 4
- 1966 Stefan Katolik 7
- 1967 Bernard Przybylski 9
- 1968 Zygmunt Gadecki/Jerzy Swoboda 7
- 1969 Henryk Siwka 9
- 1970 Edward Widera 7
- 1971 Czeslaw Plaskota/Henryk Siwka 6
- 1972 Czeslaw Plaskota/Edward Widera 5
- 1973 Ron Horfiniak 5
- 1974 Andrew Czapnik/Marian Jaworski 5
- 1975 Eugeniusz Lerch 5
- 1976 Hugh Humphreys 5
- 1977 Tomasz Koter 4
- 1978 Ralph Esposito 5
- 1979 Richard Sekulski 14
- 1980 Tadeusz Krysinski 13
- 1981 Tadeusz Krysinski 14
- 1982 Alex Marshall 12
- 1983 Alex Marshall 12
- 1984 Janusz Przybyla 23
- 1985 Greg Warszawski 11
- 1986 Janusz Przybyla/Alex Marshall 3
- 1987 Kees Storm 11
- 1988 Greg Warszawski 11
- 1989 Bogdan Bonk 8
- 1990 Bogdan Bonk/Danny Ward 8
- 1991 Hussein Latif 5
- 1992 Hussein Latif 7
- 1993 Hussein Latif 11
- 1994 Zlate Bogoevski 9
- 1995 Kamil Gamanski 9
- 1996 David Beattie 12
- 1997 Michael Calandrella 14
- 1998 Kamil Gamanski 8
- 1999
- 2000 Paul Dzielakowski 16
- 2001 Paul Dzielakowski 11
- 2002 Ivan Devcic 12
- 2003 Ivan Devcic 13
- 2004 Konrad Leski 7
- 2005 Dominic Murdaca 13
- 2006 Wojciech Galon 3
- 2007 Konrad Leski 14
- 2008 Marcin Goralczyk/Mark Grixti 8
- 2009 John Strycharski 7
- 2010 Kacper Hubiak 10
- 2011 Kacper Hubiak 13
- 2012 Kacper Hubiak/Robert Chelchowski 9
- 2013 Kacper Hubiak 15
- 2014 Robert Chelchowski 9
- 2015 Robert Chelchowski 8
- 2016 Robert Chelchowski 12
- 2017 Matthew Lodkowski 10
- 2018 Matthew Lodkowski 32
- 2019 Matthew Lodkowski 12
- 2020
- 2021 Alister Smart 9
- 2022 Jason Hayne 11
- 2023 Matthew Lodkowski 11
- 2024 Kacper Hubiak/Timothy Williams 9
- 2025 Teddy Negrit/Naoya Tani 6
- 2026 Minjun Kim 10

Club All Time Leading League Goal Scorers 1951–2026: *No record of scorers from season 1951–1954 and 1958
| Name | Years | League Goals |
|---|---|---|
| Robert Chelchowski | 2009–2016, 2018–2021 | 86 |
| Kacper Hubiak | 2009–2016, 2024-2025 | 80 |
| Matthew Lodkowski | 2016–2024 | 78 |
| Mieczyslaw Jurecki | 1960–1965 | 57 |
| Janusz Przybyla | 1982–1989 | 56 |
| Ivan Devcic | 1991–1992, 2000–2003 | 56 |
| Brendan Lakic | 1978–83, 1987–89, 1994–95 | 46 |
| Kamil Gamanski | 1993–1998, 2001–2005 | 44 |
| Tadeusz Krysinski | 1980–1983, 2000 | 40 |
| Konrad Leski | 2003–2008, 2010 | 38 |
| Paul Dzielakowski | 1990–1992, 1995, 2000–2002 | 37 |
| Kazimierz Kowalec | 1964–1972 | 35 |
| Alex Marshall | 1981–1983, 1986–1987 | 35 |
| Michael Calandrella | 1996–1998, 2001 | 34 |
| Greg Warszawski | 1985–1988 | 33 |
| Edward Jankowski | 1963–1964 | 31 |
| George Pittoni | 1954–1956 | 30* |

== Longest Serving Players (First Team Appearances) ==
=== 17 seasons ===
- Peter Czapnik (1975–1991)
- Lukasz Lewinski (1998, 2000–2008, 2010–2011, 2013–2014, 2016–2018)
- Matthew Kowalski (2003–2016, 2018–2019, 2021)

=== 16 seasons ===
- Andrew Czapnik (1969–1977, 1980–1986)

=== 14 seasons ===
- Richard Lipiarski (1975–1977, 1979–1989)
- Maciej Slodyczka (2005–2010, 2012–2019)

=== 13 seasons ===
- Edward Marmur (1965–1977)

=== 12 seasons ===
- Michael Olinowski (1964–1975)
- Wojciech Galon (2001–2006, 2010, 2012–2016)
- Charles Mizzi (2008–2019)

=== 11 seasons ===
- Ron Horfiniak (1971–1980, 1983)
- Brendon Lakic (1978–1983, 1987–1989, 1994–1995)
- Kamil Gamanski (1993–1998, 2001–2005)
- Robert Chelchowski (2009–2016, 2018–2019, 2021)

=== 10 seasons ===
- Henryk Jakubowski (1951–1960)
- Czeslaw Plaskota (1964–1973)
- Zbigniew Szalinski (1968, 1970–1978)
- Marian Jaworski (1971–1977, 1981–1983)
- Leszek Dzielakowski (1978–1983, 1985–1986, 1988–1989)
- Kacper Hubiak (2009-2016, 2024-2025)

=== 9 seasons ===
- Wieslaw Janczyk (1959–1961, 1963–1968)
- Kazimierz Kowalec (1964–1972)
- Czeslaw Plaskota (1964–1972)
